= Floyd Mayweather Jr. vs. Phillip N'dou =

Boxing match

- Date: November 1, 2003
- Venue: Van Andel Arena, Grand Rapids, Michigan, U.S.
- Title(s) on the line: WBC and The Ring lightweight titles

Tale of the tape
Boxer	Floyd Mayweather Jr.	Phillip N'dou
Nickname	Pretty Boy	The Time Bomb
Hometown	Grand Rapids, Michigan, U.S.	Thohoyandou, Limpopo, South Africa
Purse	$3,000,000	$250,000
Pre-fight record	30–0 (20 KO)	31–1 (30 KO)
Age	26 years, 8 months	26 years, 5 months
Height	5 ft 8 in (173 cm)	5 ft 10 1/2 in (179 cm)
Weight	135 lb (61 kg)	134 lb (61 kg)
Style	Orthodox	Orthodox
Recognition	WBC and The Ring; Lightweight Champion; The Ring No. 7 ranked pound-for-pound fighter 2-division world champion	WBC; No. 1 Ranked Lightweight

Result
- Mayweather wins via 7th-round technical knockout

Floyd Mayweather Jr. vs. Phillip N'dou was a professional boxing match contested on November 1, 2003, for the WBC and The Ring lightweight titles.

== Background ==
In what was expected to be his final fight as a lightweight, reigning WBC and The Ring lightweight champion Floyd Mayweather was matched up against mandatory challenger and the WBC's number-one ranked lightweight contender Phillip N'dou. N'dou, who had mostly fought in his native South Africa and was virtually unknown in the United States, was looked at as possibly Mayweather's strongest opponent to date as he sported an impressive 31–1 record with all but one victory coming by way of knockout.

The fight was held at the Van Andel Arena in Mayweather's native Grand Rapids, Michigan, in what would prove to be the third and final time Mayweather would make a title defense in his hometown. Mayweather would state about his homecoming "It's always a joy to come back home and put on a show for the my fans, friends and relatives. This fight against N'dou is very important to me and as I would like to make it a night to remember for all my fans here in Grand Rapids."

Prior to departing South Africa for the fight, N'dou was invited to the office of former South African president Nelson Mandela for a pre-fight pep talk in which he advised N'dou to "keep Mayweather on the outside with the jab, work the body and the head will become available." The then-current South African president Thabo Mbeki would write a note to N'dou in which he expressed "full confidence" that N'dou would put forth a performance that would make all South Africans proud and defeat Mayweather. When Mayweather heard of N'dou's meeting with Mandela he quipped "Nelson Mandela's a great man, he's big in America, but Mandela can't get in there and fight for him."

== The fights ==
=== Márquez vs. Gainer ===
The chief support saw a featherweight unification bout between IBF champion Juan Manuel Márquez and WBA champion Derrick Gainer. Gainer twice previously been in line to face Márquez before pulling out.

==== The fight ====
Márquez would spend the bout as the aggressor while Gainer would spend his spend time backpedalling and only sporadically throwing punches at Márquez. The crowd started booing in the 5th round, frustrated by the lack of action. The 7th saw a clash of heads which opened a tear over Gainer's left eye. The ringside doctor was called up to examine it and he recommend that the fight be stopped. The bout went to the scorecards and Márquez was awarded a unanimous decision victory with scores of 70–63, 70–63 and 69–64.

Preceded by vs. Marcos Licona	Juan Manuel Márquez's bouts 1 November 2003	Succeeded by vs. Manny Pacquiao
Preceded by vs. Oscar León	Derrick Gainer's bouts 1 November 2003	Succeeded by vs. Chris John

=== Main Event ===
Mayweather dominated N'dou from the opening bell. N'dou was aggressive throwing more punches through the fight's seven rounds, but often left himself open to Mayweather's counter punches. Though known for his strong defense, Mayweather put forth a strong offensive performance as he hammered N'dou with power punches throughout the fight, landing 116 of 201 thrown power shots for an impressive 58% success rate and landed over half of his total punches as he landed 158 out of 304 thrown punches. Mayweather had N'dou on wobbly legs in the fifth as he landed a barrage of power punches during the second minute of the round, though Mayweather let up and allowed N'dou to throw his own barrage as Mayweather was against the ropes, though he missed a majority of them as Mayweather bobbed and weaved to avoid them. Mayweather finally put an exhausted N'dou down midway through the seventh round. Upon the knockdown, N'dou's trainer Nick Durandt began to wave the white towel to signify surrender though N'dou protested. Though N'dou was able to get back up, referee Frank Garza decided he could not continue and stopped the fight.

== Fight card ==
Confirmed bouts:

Weight Class	Weight		vs.		Method	Round	Notes
Lightweight	135 lbs.	Floyd Mayweather Jr. (c)	def.	Phillip N'dou	TKO	7/12	^{note 1}
Featherweight	126 lbs.	Juan Manuel Márquez (c)	def.	Derrick Gainer (c)	TD-U	7/12	^{note 2}
Preliminary bouts
Welterweight	147 lbs.	Dmitry Salita	def.	Verdell Smith	UD	6/6
Super Bantamweight	122 lbs.	Eduardo Escobedo	def.	Sandro Orlando Oviedo	KO	2/6
Heavyweight	200+ lbs.	Marselles Brown	def.	Innocent Otukwu	KO	4/6
Super Lightweight	140 lbs.	Wes Ferguson	def.	Harold Cutts	UD	4/4

^Note 1 For WBC and The Ring Lightweight Titles
^Note 2 For WBA and IBF Featherweight Titles

== Broadcasting ==
Country	Broadcaster
United Kingdom	Sky Sports
United States	HBO

Preceded by vs. Victoriano Sosa	Floyd Mayweather Jr.'s bouts 1 November 2003	Succeeded by vs. DeMarcus Corley
Preceded by vs. Yoni Vargas	Phillip N'dou's bouts 1 November 2003	Succeeded by vs. Isaac Hlatshwayo
