= Floyd Mayweather Jr. vs. Henry Bruseles =

2005 boxing match

- Date: January 22, 2005
- Venue: American Airlines Arena, Miami, Florida, U.S.
- Title(s) on the line: WBC Super Lightweight title eliminator

Tale of the tape
Boxer	Floyd Mayweather Jr.	Henry Bruseles
Nickname	Pretty Boy	El Nitro
Hometown	Grand Rapids, Michigan, U.S.	Gurabo, Puerto Rico
Pre-fight record	32–0 (21 KO)	21–2–1 (13 KO)
Age	27 years, 10 months	24 years, 7 months
Height	5 ft 8 in (173 cm)	5 ft 7 in (170 cm)
Weight	139 lb (63 kg)	139 lb (63 kg)
Style	Orthodox	Orthodox
Recognition	WBC; No. 1 Ranked Light Welterweight; WBA/IBF/The Ring; No. 3 Ranked Light Welterweight; The Ring; No. 2 ranked pound-for-pound fighter 2-division world champion	WBO; No. 3 Ranked Light Welterweight; WBC; No. 17 Ranked Light Welterweight

Result
- Mayweather wins via 8th-round technical knockout

Floyd Mayweather Jr. vs. Henry Bruseles was a professional boxing match contested on January 22, 2005.

== Background ==
Floyd Mayweather Jr. had made his debut at super lightweight eight months prior on May 22, 2004, defeating DeMarcus Corley in a WBC super lightweight title eliminator to become the WBC's number-one contender and mandatory challenger to super lightweight champion Arturo Gatti, whom Mayweather had heavily pursued. Two months later, Gatti successfully defended his title against Leonard Doroftei. Though Gatti had remained non-committal about facing Mayweather before defeating Doroftei, instead mentioning Paul Spadafora as a possible opponent, he answered "Mayweather, of course" when asked who he would like to face next immediately after defeating Doroftei. In June 2004, Mayweather was convicted on two counts of battery stemming from an incident between him and two women at a Las Vegas nightclub. Mayweather was given a one-year suspended sentence, ordered to undergo counseling and was inactive for the remainder of the year. In December, it was announced that Mayweather would return to boxing to face little-known Puerto Rican fighter Henry Bruseles on January 22 at the American Airlines Arena in Miami, Florida. Officially recognized as a WBC super lightweight title eliminator, the bout was expected to be a tune-up for Mayweather prior to facing Gatti later in June 2005. Gatti would face aging former super featherweight champion Jesse James Leija in a tune-up bout of his own a week after the Mayweather–Bruseles fight.

== The fight ==
Mayweather dominated the overmatched Bruseles, winning every round and landing combinations almost at will throughout the fight. The end came in eighth round after Mayweather forced Bruseles to take a knee after landing a right uppercut to the body. Bruseles was able to get back up, took a standing eight-count and continued the fight, but Mayweather went on the attack and again sent Bruseles to his knees after landing a combination to his head. Bruseles again answered referee Jorge Alonso's standing eight-count and was about to continue the fight, but his trainer Evangelista Cotto jumped onto the ring apron signifying he wanted the fight stopped. Alonso then called the fight with five seconds left in the round, giving Mayweather the victory by technical knockout.

== Fight card ==
Confirmed bouts:

Weight Class	Weight		vs.		Method	Round	Notes
Super Lightweight	140 lbs.	Floyd Mayweather Jr.	def.	Henry Bruseles	TKO	8/12	^{note 1}
Heavyweight	200+ lbs.	Samuel Peter	def.	Yanqui Díaz	TKO	5/12	^{note 2}
Welterweight	147 lbs.	Terry Lantz	vs.	Jose Angel Roman	D	6/6
Heavyweight	200+ lbs.	Albert Sosnowski	def.	Tommy Connelly	TKO	2/6
Lightweight	135 lbs.	Daniel Jiménez	def.	Isidro Tejedor	TKO	4/6
Heavyweight	200+ lbs.	Victor Bisbal	def.	Douglas Robertson	UD	4/4

^Note 1 WBC Super Lightweight Title Eliminator
^Note 2 For IBF USBA Heavyweight Title

== Broadcasting ==
Country	Broadcaster
United States	HBO

Preceded by vs. DeMarcus Corley	Floyd Mayweather Jr.'s bouts 22 January 2005	Succeeded by vs. Arturo Gatti
Preceded by vs. Ener Julio	Henry Bruseles's bouts 22 January 2005	Succeeded by vs. Armando Cordoba
