= Floyd Mayweather Jr. =

American boxer and boxing promoter (born 1977)

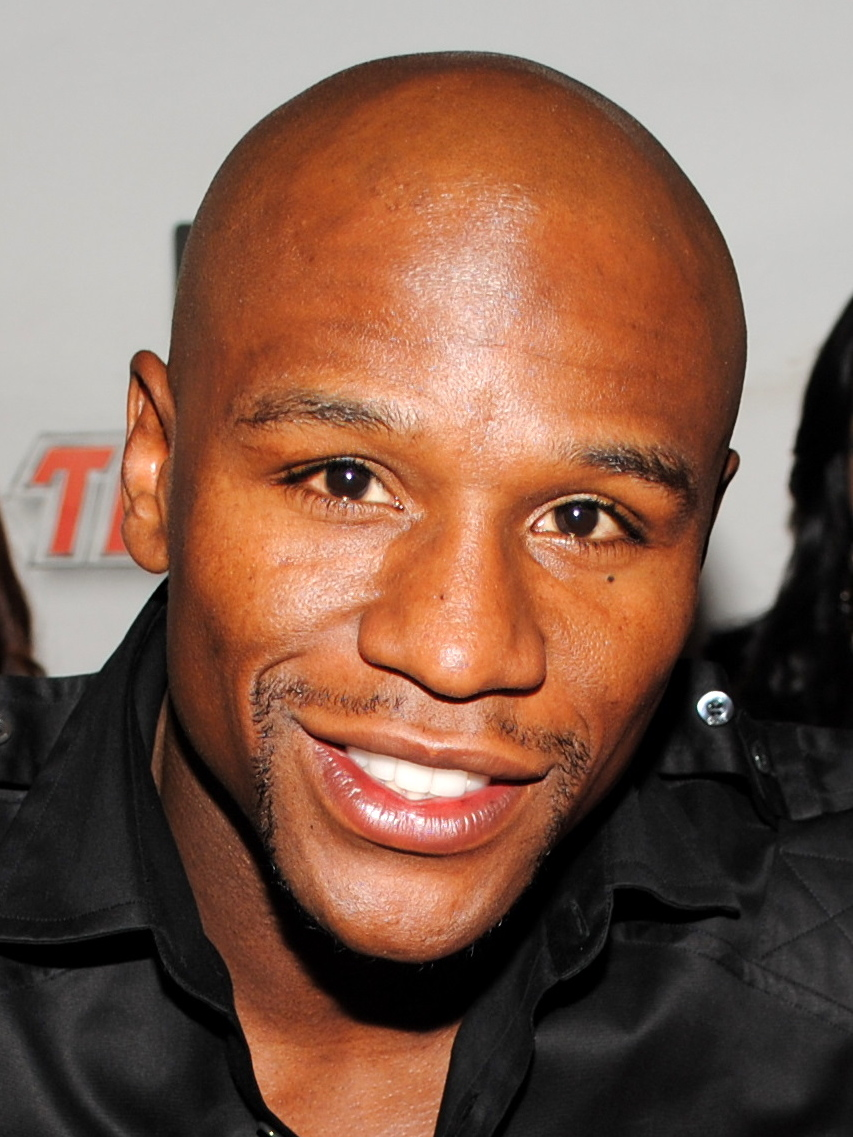
- Mayweather in 2011

Personal information
- Nicknames: Money; Pretty Boy; TBE (The Best Ever)
- Born: Floyd Joy Sinclair; February 24, 1977 (age 49) Grand Rapids, Michigan, U.S.
- Height: 5 ft 8 in (173 cm)
- Weight: Super featherweight; Lightweight; Light welterweight; Welterweight; Light middleweight

Boxing career
- Reach: 72 in (183 cm)
- Stance: Orthodox

Boxing record
- Total fights: 50
- Wins: 50
- Win by KO: 27
Medal record
Men's amateur boxing
Representing United States
Olympic Games
| Bronze medal – third place | 1996 Atlanta | Featherweight |

Floyd Joy Mayweather Jr. (né Sinclair; born February 24, 1977) is an American professional boxer and boxing promoter. He is undefeated at 50–0. Mayweather won 15 major world championships spanning five weight classes from super featherweight to light middleweight. This includes the Ring magazine title in three weight classes. As an amateur, he won a bronze medal in the featherweight division at the 1996 Olympics, three U.S. Golden Gloves championships (at light flyweight, flyweight, and featherweight), and the U.S. national championship at featherweight. After retiring from professional boxing in August 2017, he transitioned to exhibition boxing.

As of July 2025, BoxRec ranks him the third greatest boxer of all time, pound for pound. Mayweather was named "Fighter of the Decade" for the 2010s by the Boxing Writers Association of America (BWAA) and The Sporting News, a two-time winner of The Ring magazine's Fighter of the Year award (1998 and 2007), a three-time winner of the BWAA Fighter of the Year award (2007, 2013, and 2015), and a six-time winner of the Best Fighter ESPY Award (2007–2010, 2012–2014). In 2016, ESPN ranked him the greatest boxer, pound for pound, of the last 25 years; in 2024, they also ranked him the best boxer of the 21st century. In 2025, The Ring ranked him the greatest boxer, pound-for-pound, of the 21st century.

He is referred to as one of the best defensive boxers in history: since the existence of CompuBox, Mayweather is the most accurate puncher among professional boxers, having the highest plus–minus ratio in recorded boxing history. He has a tied record with Joe Louis of 26 consecutive wins in world title fights. He also holds 24 wins (7 KOs) against former or current world titlists, and 8 wins (3 KOs) against International Boxing Hall of Fame inductees. He was inducted into the International Boxing Hall of Fame in the class of 2021.

Mayweather is one of the most lucrative pay-per-view attractions of all time, in any sport. He topped the Forbes and Sports Illustrated lists of the 50 highest-paid athletes of 2012 and 2013, and the Forbes list again in both 2014 and 2015, as the highest-paid athlete in the world. In 2006, he founded his own boxing promotional firm, Mayweather Promotions, after leaving Bob Arum's Top Rank. He has generated approximately 24 million PPV buys and $1.67 billion in revenue throughout his career. In 2018, he was the highest-paid athlete in the world, with total earnings, including endorsements, of $285 million, according to Forbes. In November, 2021, Mayweather was ranked by Sportico as the sixth highest-paid athlete of all time, with his income totaling an inflation-adjusted $1.2 billion; he stood at No. 10 when the ranking was updated in April, 2026, with his earnings estimated at inflation-adjusted $1.57 billion.

== Early life ==
Mayweather was born Floyd Joy Sinclair on February 24, 1977, in Grand Rapids, Michigan, into a family of boxers. His father, Floyd Mayweather Sr., is a former welterweight contender who fought Hall of Famer Sugar Ray Leonard. His uncles Jeff and the late Roger Mayweather were professional boxers, with the latter—Floyd's former trainer—winning two world championships, as well as fighting Hall of Famers Julio César Chávez, Pernell Whitaker, and Kostya Tszyu. Mayweather was born with his mother's last name, but his last name would change to Mayweather shortly thereafter. His maternal grandfather was born in Kingston, Jamaica. He attended Ottawa Hills High School before dropping out.

Boxing has been a part of Mayweather's life since his childhood and he never seriously considered any other profession. "I think my grandmother saw my potential first," he said. "When I was young, I told her, 'I think I should get a job.' She said, 'No, just keep boxing.'" During the 1980s, Mayweather lived in the Hiram Square neighborhood of New Brunswick, New Jersey, where his mother had relatives. He later said, "When I was about eight or nine, I lived in New Jersey with my mother and we were seven deep in one bedroom and sometimes we didn't have electricity. When people see what I have now, they have no idea of where I came from and how I didn't have anything growing up."

It was common for the young Mayweather to come home from school and find used heroin needles in his front yard. His mother was addicted to drugs, and he had an aunt who died from AIDS because of her drug use. "People don't know the hell I've been through," he says. The most time that his father spent with him was taking him to the gym to train and work on his boxing, according to Mayweather. "I don't remember him ever taking me anywhere or doing anything that a father would do with a son, going to the park or to the movies or to get ice cream," he says. "I always thought that he liked his daughter [Floyd's older sister] better than he liked me because she never got whippings and I got whippings all the time."

Mayweather's father contends that Floyd is not telling the truth about their early relationship. "Even though his daddy did sell drugs, I didn't deprive my son," the elder Mayweather says. "The drugs I sold, he was a part of it. He had plenty of food. He had the best clothes and I gave him money. He didn't want for anything. Anybody in Grand Rapids can tell you that I took care of my kids". Floyd Sr. says he did all of his hustling at night and spent his days with his son, taking him to the gym and training him to be a boxer. "If it wasn't for me he wouldn't be where he is today," he maintains.

"I basically raised myself," Mayweather says. "My grandmother did what she could. When she got mad at me I'd go to my mom's house. My life was ups and downs." His father says he knows how much pain his incarceration caused his son, but insists he did the best he could. "I sent him to live with his grandmother," he says. "It wasn't like I left him with strangers." In the absence of his father, boxing became an outlet for Mayweather. As the elder Mayweather served his time, his son put all of his energy into boxing and dropped out of high school. "I knew that I was going to have to try to take care of my mom and I made the decision that school wasn't that important at the time and I was going to have to box to earn a living," he said.

== Amateur career ==
Mayweather had an amateur record of 84 wins and 8 losses, and won national Golden Gloves championships in 1993 (at 106 lb), 1994 (at 114 lb), and 1996 (at 125 lb). He was nicknamed "Pretty Boy" by his amateur teammates because he had relatively few scars, a result of the defensive techniques that his father and uncle (Roger Mayweather) had taught him. In his orthodox defensive stance Mayweather often utilizes a variation of crab style, with the shoulder roll, an old-school boxing technique in which the right hand is held normally (or slightly higher than normal), the left hand is down around the midsection and the lead shoulder is raised high on the cheek in order to cover the chin and block punches. The right hand (as in the orthodox stance) is used as it normally would be: to block punches coming from the other side, such as left hooks. From this stance Mayweather blocks, slips and deflects most of his opponents' punches (even when cornered) by twisting left and right to the rhythm of their punches.

=== 1996 Olympics ===
At the 1996 Olympics in Atlanta, Mayweather won a bronze medal by reaching the semi-finals of the featherweight (57-kg) division.

In the first fight, Mayweather led 10–1 on points over Bakhtiyar Tileganov of Kazakhstan, before winning when the fight was stopped. In the second fight, Mayweather outpointed Artur Gevorgyan of Armenia 16–3. In the quarterfinals, the 19-year-old Mayweather narrowly defeated 22-year-old Lorenzo Aragon of Cuba in an all-action bout to win 12–11, becoming the first U.S. boxer to defeat a Cuban in 20 years. The last time this occurred was the 1976 Summer Olympics, when the U.S. Olympic boxing team captured five gold medals; among the recipients was Sugar Ray Leonard. In his semifinal bout against eventual silver medalist Serafim Todorov of Bulgaria, Mayweather lost by a controversial decision (similar to Roy Jones Jr.'s highly controversial decision loss to Park Si-hun at the 1988 Summer Olympics). Referee Hamad Hafaz Shouman of Egypt mistakenly raised Mayweather's hand (thinking he had won), while the decision was announced giving the bout to the Bulgarian.

The U.S. team filed a protest over the Mayweather bout, claiming the judges were intimidated by Bulgaria's Emil Jetchev (head of the boxing officials) into favoring the Bulgarian Todorov by a 10–9 decision in the 125-pound semifinal bout. Three of Jetchev's countrymen were in gold medal bouts. Judge Bill Waeckerle (one of the four U.S. judges working the games for the International Amateur Boxing Federation) resigned as Olympic Games and federation judge after Mayweather lost the decision, which was loudly booed by the crowd at the Alexander Memorial Coliseum. "I refuse to be part of an organization that continues to conduct its officiating in this manner", Waeckerle wrote in his letter of resignation to federation president Anwar Chowdhry.

In the official protest U.S. team manager Gerald Smith said Mayweather landed punches that were not counted, while Todorov was awarded points without landing a punch. "The judging was totally incompetent," Waeckerle said. The judges failed to impose a mandatory two-point deduction against Todorov after he was warned five times by the referee for slapping. "Everybody knows Floyd Mayweather is the gold-medal favorite at 57 kilograms," Mayweather said afterward. "In America, it's known as 125 pounds. You know and I know I wasn't getting hit. They say he's the world champion. Now you all know who the real world champion is."

Featherweight Olympic qualification

- Defeated William Jenkins RSC/TKO-3
- Defeated James Baker RSCH/TKO-1
- Lost to Augie Sanchez PTS (11–12)
- Defeated Carlos Navarro PTS (31–11)
- Defeated Augie Sanchez PTS (12–8) in the box-offs
- Defeated Augie Sanchez PTS (20–10) in the box-offs

Olympic results

- Defeated Bakhtiyar Tileganov (Kazakhstan) RSCI/TKO-2
- Defeated Artur Gevorgyan (Armenia) PTS (16–3)
- Defeated Lorenzo Aragon (Cuba) PTS (12–11)
- Lost to Serafim Todorov (Bulgaria) PTS (9–10)* (won bronze medal)

*Decision was protested unsuccessfully by the U.S. team

== Professional career ==
=== Super featherweight ===
Mayweather won his first professional bout on October 11, 1996, when he knocked out fellow newcomer Roberto Apodaca in Round 2. Mayweather's trainer at the time was his uncle, Roger Mayweather; his father was still imprisoned after his conviction for illegal drug trafficking in 1993. The latter took over as his son's trainer when he was released from prison (after Mayweather Jr.'s 14th fight—a second-round knockout of Sam Girard). From 1996 to early 1998, Mayweather won most of his fights by knockout or TKO.

Early in his pro career, Mayweather received praise from all corners of the boxing world and was touted as a pugilistic prodigy. During his fight with Tony Duran the ESPN commentator remarked, "Emmanuel Steward was quoted as saying there have been very few who have been more talented than this kid. He will probably win two or three world championships; I think he will go on to be the best ever". IBHOF trainer and commentator Gil Clancy commented before Mayweather's ninth professional fight (against Jesus Chavez), "I thought that Floyd Mayweather was the outstanding pro prospect in the entire Olympic games".

==== Mayweather vs. Hernandez ====
In 1998, within two years of entering professional boxing, Mayweather decisively won his first world title (the WBC super featherweight (130 lb) championship) with an eighth-round technical knockout of The Ring world #1-ranked super featherweight Genaro Hernández after his opponent's cornerman stopped the fight. It was Hernández' first defeat in that weight class; he said after the fight, "He defeated me, he is quick, smart and I always knew he had the speed. I give him respect. He is a true champ".

With Mayweather's win he became lineal champion of the division; Genaro Hernández had previously beaten Azumah Nelson, whose dominance of the super-featherweight division had prompted boxing publications to give him the vacant lineal championship.

Mayweather became the first 1996 U.S. Olympian to win a world title. Following his victory Mayweather's promoter Bob Arum said, "We believe in our heart of hearts that Floyd Mayweather is the successor in a line that starts with Ray Robinson, goes to Muhammad Ali, then Sugar Ray Leonard...We believe that he epitomizes that style of fighting".

==== Mayweather vs. Manfredy ====
After capturing the title Mayweather defended it against contender Angel Manfredy with a TKO in round two, giving Manfredy his first defeat in four years.

By the end of 1998 Mayweather was ranked by The Ring as the #8-ranked pound-for-pound best boxer in the world, and became one of the youngest recipients of The Ring's Fighter of the Year award (21, the same age Sugar Ray Robinson and Muhammad Ali were when winning their first awards).

In 1999, Mayweather continued his domination of the super featherweight division by defending his title three more times. The second defense of his title was against the Argentine Carlos Rios, which he won in a unanimous decision. Mayweather, fighting past the eighth round for only the third time in his career, won on the judges' scoring 120–110, 119–108, and 120–109.

Mayweather's third title defense was against Justin Juuko, which he won via knockout in the ninth round. Juuko could not beat the count of 10 by referee Mitch Halpern, and the fight ended in Mayweather's favor 80 seconds into that (the ninth) round. His final title defense in 1999 was against Carlos Gerena, with Mayweather winning in a seventh-round referee technical decision (RTD). Mayweather said after the fight, "I want to show the world that along with Oscar De La Hoya and Roy Jones Jr., I'm the best fighter in the world". This dominance did not go unnoticed in the boxing world; by the end of the year, the 22-year-old Mayweather was ranked The Ring's #2 pound-for-pound best boxer in the world (behind Roy Jones Jr.).

Before making the fifth successful defense of his title against former WBC Featherweight Champion Gregorio Vargas in early 2000, Mayweather fired his father as his manager and replaced him with James Prince. A few months after the fight, the rift between father and son grew when Mayweather also fired the elder Mayweather as his trainer. In a 2004 interview Mayweather said that although he loves his father, he had a better chemistry with Roger because his father had put too much pressure on him to be perfect. Mayweather, in his fifth title defense, won a near-shutout over "Goyo" Vargas in Las Vegas. During the 10th round, when Mayweather overheard HBO announcer Jim Lampley say that the champ had switched to a southpaw stance for the second time in the bout he leaned ringside and said "It was the third time". After a six-month layoff, Mayweather was still elusive. During the sixth round, Mayweather dropped Vargas with a hook to the ribs and cruised to a unanimous decision.

Roger Mayweather returned to his role as his nephew's trainer for his next bout; a non-title lightweight fight against Emanuel Augustus (then known as Emanuel Burton), which Mayweather won by ninth-round technical knockout. Years later, in an interview in 2012, Mayweather would name his fight against Augustus as the toughest of his career, and said, "If I was rating certain fighters out of every guy that I fought, I'm going to rate Emanuel Augustus first compared to all the guys that I've faced."

==== Mayweather vs. Corrales ====
In one of the more definitive and memorable fights of his career Mayweather fought the hard-hitting, former IBF super-featherweight champion Diego Corrales (33–0, with 27 KOs). Coming into the bout Mayweather and Corrales were undefeated, and neither fighter had touched the canvas. Mayweather was The Ring's #2-ranked super featherweight in the world (and #7 pound-for-pound), while Corrales was the #1-ranked super featherweight in the world and #5 pound-for-pound. Before the fight was announced Mayweather had stated he wanted to fight Corrales, who was facing jail time for allegedly beating his pregnant wife. "I want Diego because I'm doing it for all the battered women across America", Mayweather said. "Just like he beat that woman, I'm going to beat him".

While both fighters were the same age (23), Corrales had several physical advantages over Mayweather: two inches in height, an inch in reach and (despite both arriving at the official weight-in at the 130-lb super-featherweight limit) unofficially 146 lbs, versus Mayweather's 136 1/2 lbs. In the bout, Mayweather won every round and knocked down Corrales five times (three times in round 7 and twice in round 10). After the fifth knockdown, Corrales' cornermen climbed onto the apron and stopped the fight, thereby establishing Mayweather as a claimant to boxing's mythical pound-for-pound title. At the time of the stoppage, Mayweather was ahead on the scorecards, leading by 89–79, 90–79, and 90–78. Throughout the fight, HBO commentators analyzed Mayweather. Larry Merchant stated, "Mayweather fights in a tradition of boxing and quick handedness that goes back in Michigan, all the way to fighters like Sugar Ray Robinson". Harold Lederman remarked,

Jim (Lampley), I gotta tell ya, I'm terribly impressed, I don't think I've seen an exhibition of boxing like this since Willie Pep, this kid is unbelievable, great legs, great speed, unbelievable ring-generalship. I mean he's got tremendous presence in that ring, Floyd Mayweather knows where he is, every minute of this fight...

Corrales landed 60 of 205 punches, and landed no more than nine punches in a single round. Mayweather landed 220 of 414 punches. Corrales was unable to land any clean shots, as he stalked Mayweather through the early rounds. He landed an average of six punches a round, according to CompuBox stats—the first time that a fighter registered single digits on CompuBox, 20 years after it had been tracking punch statistics.

After the fight, Mayweather remarked, "I would like to fight Prince Naseem (Hamed), hopefully we can meet at 128 (lbs) or he can come up to 130 (lbs), we can fight or I can fight the winner of Casamayor..." "Prince Naseem isn't going to fight you," intervened HBO commentator Larry Merchant; who then chuckled and added: "after he saw this, it ain't gonna happen". "I really want to fight Prince Naseem..." Mayweather continued, "but hopefully I can face the winner of Casamayor (vs.) Freitas". Although neither fight materialized, Mayweather's opponent Diego Corrales would later hand Freitas (the winner of the Casamayor vs. Freitas fight) his first professional defeat and defeat Casamayor via controversial decision in a rematch of their first bout. Afterwards, Bob Arum was ecstatic about his new star. "Better than Sugar Ray Leonard", he asserted. "And did you see him at those press conferences...?"

The fight was met with acclaim in the boxing world and sports in general. CBS said, "Floyd Mayweather Jr.'s speed was dazzling. His power was unexpected" and the BBC reported on "... a near flawless performance...". The New York Daily News reported that "Floyd Mayweather Jr., displaying blazing speed and punishing power..." and Sports Illustrated reported "... a fistic masterpiece".

On October 10, 2001, boxing trainer Eddie Futch died at age 90. Tim Smith of the New York Daily News remembered an encounter with the trainer in an article.

One of the last times I saw Futch was before the Floyd Mayweather Jr.–Diego Corrales junior lightweight title bout in Vegas. Futch was talking about how much he admired Mayweather's style, how Mayweather was such a beautiful boxer, able to slip along the ropes and avoid punches. Corrales said he was going to neutralize Mayweather's hand speed by hitting Mayweather on the arms. "I guess he thinks he's going to stand there and let him hit him on the arms all night," said Futch, who correctly predicted that Mayweather would completely dismantle Corrales in a defensive masterpiece. Futch had a way of cutting to the heart of a matter. I don't know anyone in boxing who won't miss him. I don't know anyone in boxing that can take his place.

==== Mayweather vs. Hernández ====
On May 26, 2001, Mayweather, fighting in his hometown of Grand Rapids, pounded out a 12-round unanimous decision over future IBF super featherweight titleholder Carlos Hernández to retain his WBC super-featherweight title. Calling it "one of the toughest nights of my career", the 130-pound champion overcame injuries in both hands to improve his record to 26–0. "He is a very, very tough fighter," Mayweather said of the challenger, whose record fell to 33–3–1. "I'm disappointed in my performance." Mayweather suffered the first knockdown of his career when he hit Hernández with a left hook in round six, which caused him sufficient pain that he dropped his injured left hand to the canvas. He wasn't hit, but was given a standing eight-count by the referee.

==== Mayweather vs. Chávez ====
Mayweather's last fight in the super-featherweight division was against future super featherweight and lightweight titleholder Jesús Chávez. Chávez was the WBC's top-ranked contender and came into the fight with a 31-bout winning streak. This was Mayweather's eighth defense of the WBC super-featherweight title, which he had held for more than three years. He won when Chávez's corner stopped the fight after round nine. Mayweather had such difficulty making weight for this fight that he did not eat for four days before the weigh-in. Chávez stated after the fight, "He's [Mayweather] the champ! And now I become his number-one fan".

Mayweather commented after the fight, "Although it will take some time to make the match, I want to fight Kostya Tszyu". Tszyu, an Australian-based Russian, by then had established himself as the best light welterweight in the world. Mayweather did not get a chance to fight Tszyu, but went on to fight Ricky Hatton (who defeated Tszyu and won his Ring light welterweight championship). By the end of 2001, Mayweather was still ranked The Ring #1 super featherweight and #5 best pound-for-pound boxer in the world.

=== Lightweight ===
==== Mayweather vs. Castillo ====
In his first fight as a lightweight, Mayweather took on World Boxing Council (WBC) champion and The Ring #1-ranked lightweight José Luis Castillo. Despite both fighters officially meeting the 135-lb lightweight limit, Mayweather came to the ring weighing unofficially 138 1/2 lbs to Castillo's 147 1/2 lbs. He defeated Castillo, winning the WBC and vacant The Ring lightweight titles with a 12-round unanimous decision at the MGM Grand Garden Arena before a crowd of 6,920. With Mayweather's win, he became the first lineal lightweight champion since Pernell Whitaker. Judges Jerry Roth and John Keane scored it 115–111 and judge Anek Hongtongkam scored it 116–111, a decision that was loudly booed by the pro-Castillo crowd. The Associated Press had Mayweather winning, 115–111; the New York Daily News scorecard also had Mayweather winning, 116–112. It was one of the most controversial fights of the decade, with many observers believing Castillo had done enough to win.

Castillo (45–5–1, 41 KOs) could not touch Mayweather in the first round, with Castillo throwing 27 punches and landing only three. After round one Larry Merchant pointed out, "Mayweather made a comment in the corner about his left shoulder. We'll see if something's wrong with it, he seems to be rotating it, trying to keep it loose". George Foreman noted likewise, adding "'Massage my left shoulder', he (Mayweather) said, that's not a good sign".

In the first minute of the second round, Castillo went down on a shot by Mayweather, which was ruled a slip by the referee. Later in the fight Harold Lederman alluded to it, saying "By the way, that knockdown in the second round [is] extremely questionable, I thought Floyd did throw a left hook and this guy [Castillo] went down at the end of the hook but what you going to do, it's a judgement call by the referee, so it doesn't go as a 10–8 round..." Drakulich took a point from Castillo for hitting on the break in the eighth round after several warnings throughout the fight. With Castillo repeatedly hitting on the break, this led to a large number of his punches landing. George Foreman agreed with the decision ("That's what you want a referee to do"), although his counterpart Larry Merchant had an alternative view: "I think this referee has been altogether too involved in the fight. Too officious". Drakulich struck again in the ninth round, this time taking a point away from Mayweather for using his elbows. Mayweather won the fight by using his jab effectively and staying away from Castillo for much of the fight. Having injured his left shoulder on the last day of training, he changed to a southpaw stance on several occasions to throw more right-handed punches.

At the end of the fight, Harold Lederman had Castillo winning 115–111. ESPN's Max Kellerman disputed Lederman's scoring, writing in his boxing column: "Harold Lederman, the (HBO) unofficial ringside television judge, gave the third round to Castillo, which I think demonstrates that Mayweather suffers from the same scoring syndrome that afflicted Pernell Whitaker. Mayweather is so seldom hit cleanly in his face, that when a clean shot is landed against him it registers all out of proportion in the observer's mind. Meanwhile, the three clean shots Mayweather just landed against his opponent do not make the same kind of impression".

CompuBox statistics indicated that Castillo landed more overall punches and significantly more power shots over the course of the fight. Mayweather outscored Castillo in jabs thrown and landed. Lederman's scoring for this fight may be seen as inconsistent; in both Bernard Hopkins vs. Jermain Taylor fights Lederman had Taylor winning 115–113, despite Hopkins landing more overall punches and significantly more power shots during both fights. Taylor threw and landed more jabs, however.

In the post-fight interview, Mayweather said, "My last training day, I hurt my rotator cuff in my left shoulder, so I couldn't use my jab the way I want to. My left wasn't as strong as I wanted it to be, but I didn't want to have no excuses, you know, like other champions, you know, when they get hurt they won't even show up to the fight. I get hurt I keep fighting, you know, I want to bring the fans a victory".

==== Mayweather vs. Castillo II ====
Due to the closeness of their first bout, Mayweather accepted an immediate rematch with José Luis Castillo which took place on December 7, 2002. Before the rematch, Mayweather reiterated that he had torn his left rotator cuff two days before the first fight and could not throw a jab or a left hook. He had surgery following the controversial decision over Castillo, and said his shoulder had fully healed.

The smaller Mayweather was again outweighed by Castillo on the night of the fight; Castillo weighed 147 lbs, to Mayweather's 138. In the rematch Mayweather used his footwork, combinations and jab to earn another unanimous decision. There were no knockdowns or notable exchanges in the fight; the judgment was close, with Mayweather winning 115–113 on two scorecards and 116–113 on a third. The Associated Press had Mayweather winning 116–112; HBO unofficial scorer Harold Lederman and fellow analyst Larry Merchant both scored it 115–113 for Mayweather.

==== Mayweather vs. Sosa ====
On April 19, 2003, Mayweather defended his WBC lightweight title in a unanimous decision over Dominican Victoriano Sosa. Mayweather (30–0) fought a tactically sound 12-round bout against an aggressive Sosa (35–3–2).

==== Mayweather vs. N'dou ====
His next fight (on November 1 of the same year) was in his hometown of Grand Rapids against WBC #1-ranked contender Phillip N'dou, whose record was 31–1 with 30 KOs. During the run-up to the fight Nelson Mandela invited N'dou to his office for a pep talk before his departure for the U.S., advising him to "keep Mayweather on the outside with the jab, work the body and the head will become available". South African president Thabo Mbeki, in a note, said he had "full confidence" N'dou would put on a performance to make all South Africans proud and would return home with the WBC belt. When told of his opponent's high-level support Mayweather responded, "Nelson Mandela's a great man, he's big in America, but Mandela can't get in there and fight for him".

In the fifth round, Mayweather connected with a series of straight rights and lefts; when N'dou would not go down, Mayweather gave a little smile and continued the barrage. He dominated his opponent, before flooring him with a series of rights in the seventh round. N'dou got up on shaky legs, forcing a stoppage at 1:50. At times during the fight, Mayweather (in black trunks outlined with fur) seemed to toy with N'dou. By the end of 2003, Mayweather was still The Ring's lightweight champion and the #5-ranked best pound-for-pound boxer in the world.

=== Light welterweight ===
==== Mayweather vs. Corley ====
Mayweather, at 27, made his 140-pound debut by defeating former titlist DeMarcus "Chop Chop" Corley, knocking him down twice officially in rounds eight and ten, and scoring a unanimous decision of 119–107, 119–108, and 118–108. The fight was billed as a WBC elimination bout, with the winner earning a shot at 140-pound champion Arturo Gatti. "Mayweather can flat-out fight", Corley's trainer Don Turner said. "He's like magic. He makes you move into the punches." Shortly after this fight Mayweather would reach #1 on the USA Today pound-for-pound rankings, with middleweight champion Bernard Hopkins at #2.

==== Mayweather vs. Bruseles ====
On January 22, 2005, Mayweather fought Henry Bruseles in another WBC elimination bout, outclassing Bruseles throughout the first seven rounds. In round eight, Mayweather knocked Bruseles down twice and the fight was stopped. Mayweather's victory made him the mandatory challenger for Gatti's WBC light welterweight championship.

==== Mayweather vs. Gatti ====
The pay-per-view fight between Mayweather and The Ring #1-ranked contender Arturo Gatti took place June 25, 2005, in Atlantic City, New Jersey, where fans heavily supported Gatti. Before the fight Mayweather was confident, describing Gatti as "a C+ fighter," "a fake" and "a blown-up club fighter". Mayweather entered the ring being carried on a chariot to the song "Another One Bites the Dust". Gatti entered the ring accompanied by the song "Thunderstruck" and was momentarily frightened by the pyrotechnics exploding. Near the end of round one, Mayweather pushed Gatti's head down in close; Gatti broke, leaving himself vulnerable while Mayweather continued landing punches. Gatti turned to the referee to complain; Mayweather capitalised, sending Gatti to the canvas with more shots for what was scored a knockdown. Throughout the next five rounds, the quicker Mayweather landed nearly every shot against Gatti, who had no offense with which to return fire. Gatti's corner stopped the fight after round six, giving Mayweather his third world title.

In the post-fight interview, Mayweather praised Gatti, claiming that his pre-fight comments "were just to sell tickets". To many boxing experts, Mayweather's dominance of Gatti solidified his position as one of the best pound-for-pound fighters in the world. CompuBox had Mayweather out-landing Gatti 168–41, with Gatti landing only 10 power punches (anything other than a jab). Mayweather's fight with Gatti would be his last in the light-welterweight division; he would leave as The Ring #1-ranked contender, with Ricky Hatton as light-welterweight champion.

=== Welterweight ===
==== Mayweather vs. Mitchell ====
After his fight with Gatti, Mayweather moved up to the welterweight division. On November 19, 2005, Mayweather fought a non-title bout at 147 lb (67 kg) against welterweight Sharmba Mitchell. In round three, Mayweather knocked Mitchell down with a straight right hand to the head. In round six another straight right hand—this one to Mitchell's body—dropped Mitchell again, ending the fight.

==== Mayweather vs. Judah ====
On April 8, 2006, Mayweather defeated Zab Judah for the IBF welterweight title in a unanimous decision. Plans for the fight had been jeopardized after Judah lost the WBA, WBC and The Ring Welterweight titles to Carlos Baldomir on January 7, 2006; however, Mayweather's and Judah's camps reworked the contract and decided that the fight would go on. Judah started bright and caused lots of problems for Mayweather, and even managed to knock down Mayweather, however it was not ruled a knockdown. But Mayweather began to dominate Judah in round five, and the latter eventually bled. Late in the tenth round, Judah hit Mayweather with a left hand that was clearly below the belt, following with a right-handed rabbit punch. Referee Richard Steele called time out with five seconds remaining in the round. Roger Mayweather entered the ring and approached Judah, but Steele restrained him; Judah's father (and trainer), Yoel Judah, entered the ring as well. Mayweather remained in the neutral corner while the Judahs scuffled with Roger (and others who had entered the ring), until police and security restored order. Roger was ejected, and the fight continued for the scheduled 12 rounds. Mayweather won a unanimous decision by official scores of 116–112, 117–111, and 119–109. CompuBox statistics showed him landing 188 punches, compared with 82 for Judah.

Five days after the fight, the Nevada State Athletic Commission (NSAC) decided not to overturn the result of the bout; however, Roger Mayweather was fined $200,000 and suspended for one year. The suspension stipulated that Roger could train Mayweather in the gym, but could not work the corner during fights. On April 17, 2006, the IBF ordered a rematch between Mayweather and Judah; however, the NSAC suspended Judah for one year on May 8 and Mayweather vacated the IBF title on June 20.

After his fight with Judah, it was reported that Mayweather rejected an $8 million offer to fight Antonio Margarito, citing his split with promoter Bob Arum as the reason. However, Oscar De la Hoya postponed his decision until 2007, leaving Mayweather to obtain Mayweather Promotions and choose his next opponent. Mayweather considered moving up in weight again to fight light middleweight champion Cory Spinks, but because of negative publicity and Spinks' impending mandatory defense of his title, he decided to face WBC and The Ring welterweight champion Carlos Baldomir on November 4, 2006, in Las Vegas.

==== Mayweather vs. Baldomir ====
Despite having not lost in over eight years, Baldomir was an underdog in the fight. Mayweather defeated him for both titles in a unanimous decision. Ringside punch statistics showed Mayweather landing 199 of 458 punches, while Baldomir landed 79 of 670. Mayweather earned $8 million for the fight; Baldomir was paid $1.6 million, career earnings highs for each fighter at the time.

During the fight Baldomir chased Mayweather, unable to land any meaningful shots but trying to be the busier fighter; Mayweather picked away with sharp jabs and hooks, cutting Baldomir over his left eye in the first round. This pattern continued throughout the fight; the defensive-minded Mayweather put on what many witnesses (and Mayweather himself) called a "boxing clinic" to take Baldomir's WBC and The Ring welterweight titles in a lopsided 12-round decision by scores of 120–108, 120–108, and 118–110. After the fight, Mayweather proposed a match with Oscar De La Hoya.

With Mayweather's win, he became the first fighter since Roberto Durán to have captured The Ring titles in both the lightweight and welterweight divisions.

=== Light middleweight ===
==== Mayweather vs. De La Hoya ====
Mayweather's next match was the long-anticipated fight against six-division champion and WBC light-middleweight titleholder Oscar De La Hoya on May 5, 2007. De La Hoya's belt was on the line, which required Mayweather to move up in weight from 147 pounds to 154. However, Mayweather was outweighed by more than 10 pounds the night of the fight, coming in at only 150 pounds. Despite De La Hoya's insistence that money was not a factor, the Mayweather-De La Hoya bout set the record for most PPV buys for a boxing match with 2.4 million households, breaking the previous record of 1.95 million for Evander Holyfield vs. Mike Tyson II. About $120 million in revenue was generated by the PPV, another record. Including percentages De La Hoya earned $58 million for the bout, the highest purse ever for a fighter; the previous record was $35 million, held by Tyson and Holyfield. Mayweather earned about $25 million for the fight.

At one time, Floyd Mayweather Sr. negotiated to train Oscar De La Hoya and be in his corner during the fight, but De La Hoya decided to train with Freddie Roach. Mayweather won the fight by a split decision in 12 rounds, capturing the WBC title. However, many analysts and ringside observers felt Mayweather should have received a unanimous decision. During the early rounds De La Hoya had some success cutting off the ring, attempting to pound Mayweather on the inside. Despite his activity on the inside, however, many of De La Hoya's punches were ineffective and landed on Mayweather's arms or shoulders. By the middle of the fight, it was seen as an even bout by the announcers. Mayweather turned the tide in the middle and late rounds, often hitting De La Hoya at will. Official scorecards read 116–112 (Mayweather), 115–113 (Mayweather), and 115–113 (De La Hoya). CompuBox had Mayweather out-landing De La Hoya 207–122 in total punches and 134–82 in power punches, with better accuracy throughout the fight. After the bout Mayweather contemplated retirement, saying he had nothing left to prove in the boxing world.

=== Return to welterweight ===
==== Mayweather vs. Hatton ====
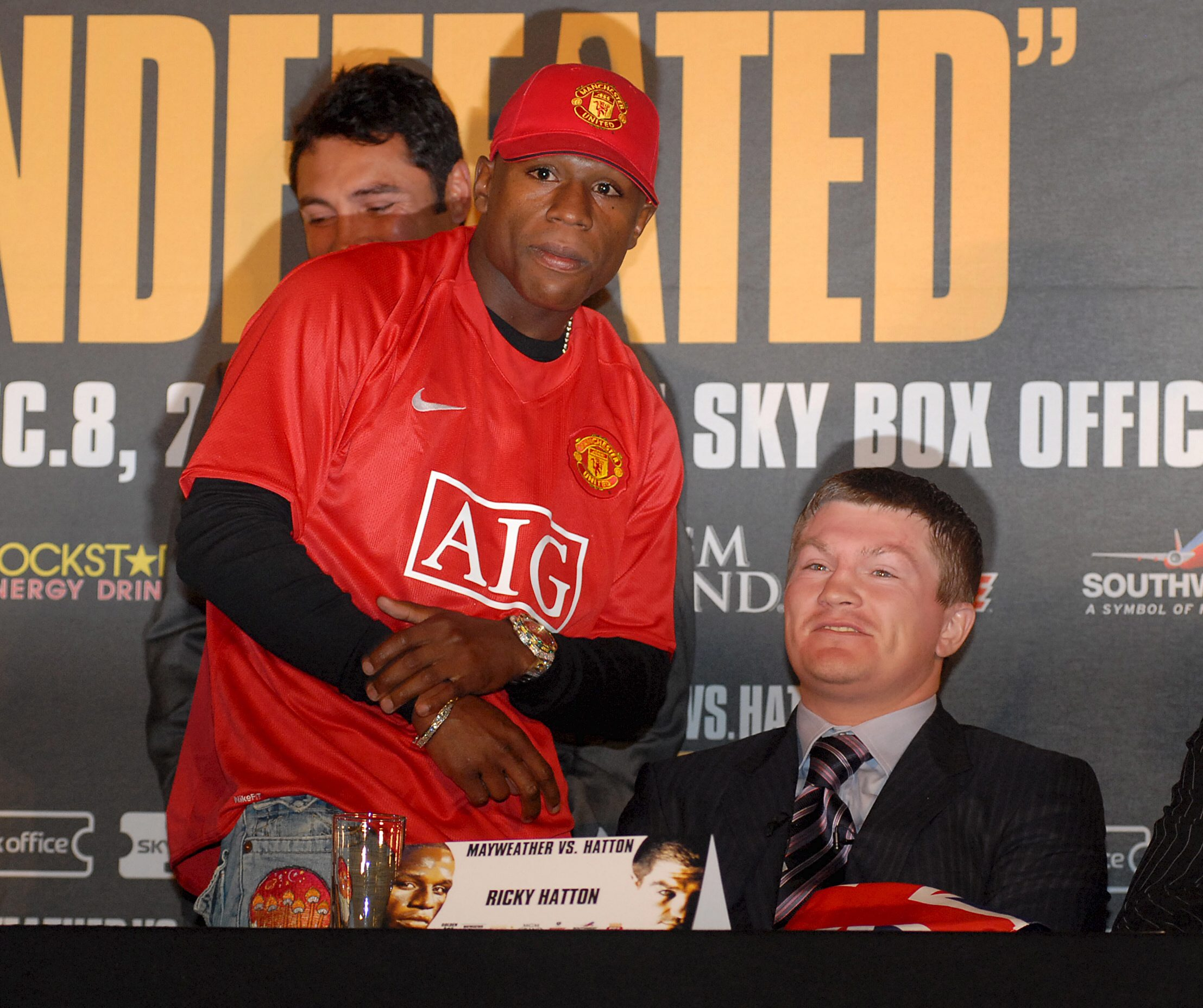
Mayweather and Ricky Hatton at a press conference, 2007

After his fight with De La Hoya, Mayweather decided to relinquish his WBC light-middleweight championship, retaining his welterweight title. On July 28, 2007, it was announced that Mayweather would come out of his brief retirement to fight The Ring light welterweight champion Ricky Hatton; the bout was promoted by De La Hoya's promotion company (Golden Boy Promotions) and Mayweather's Mayweather Promotions. The fight was entitled "Undefeated"; it took place December 8, 2007, at the MGM Grand Garden Arena, Las Vegas, Nevada, the biggest welterweight showdown between two undefeated fighters since De La Hoya met Félix Trinidad in 1999. During the run-up to their fight Mayweather claimed he was the greatest boxer ever: "I respect what Robinson and Ali did for the sport. But I am the greatest and this is my time."

Mayweather controlled the fight from the beginning, knocking Hatton out in the 10th round to retain the welterweight championship. Hatton suffered a cut over his right eye in round three; from that point, his pace and movement began to slow. In round six, Hatton lost a point for punching the back of Mayweather's head as he was draped over the ropes. During the tenth round, Hatton was caught by a checked left hook thrown from Mayweather's hip; after falling headfirst into the turnbuckle, he hit the floor. Hatton made it to his feet, but was dazed. Two more lefts in quick succession knocked Hatton down again, and referee Cortez stopped the fight at 1:35 of round ten. Official scorecards read 88–82, 89–81, and 89–81 at the time of stoppage, all in favor of Mayweather.

=== Retirement ===
After the fight, Mayweather said that Hatton was one of his toughest, most tenacious opponents. Mayweather announced his retirement from boxing to concentrate on his promotional company, saying he wanted Hatton to be his first client.

=== Comeback ===
==== Mayweather vs. Marquez ====
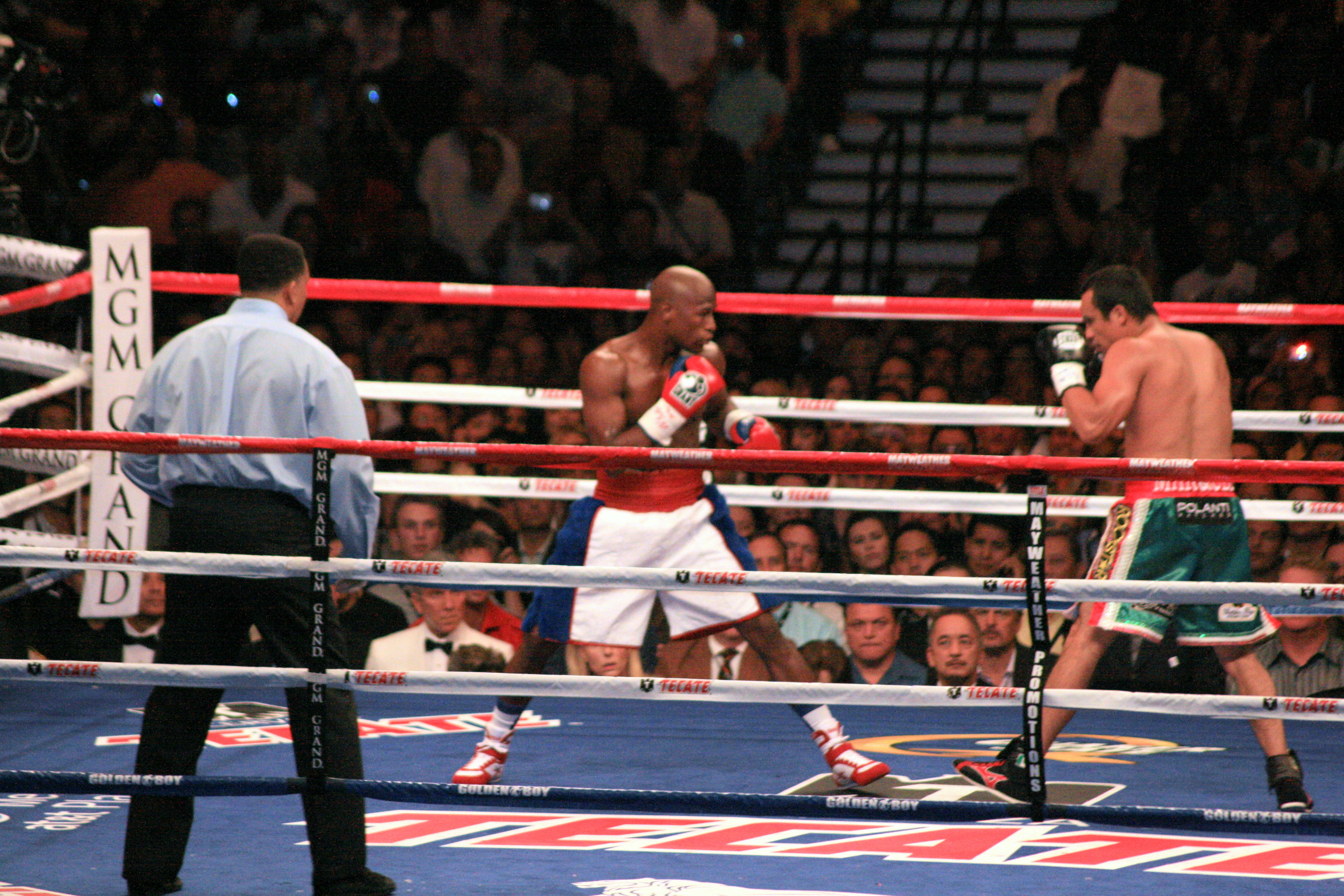
Mayweather during his comeback bout against Juan Manuel Márquez, 2009

On May 2, 2009, it was confirmed that Mayweather was coming out of a 21-month retirement to fight The Ring lightweight champion and #2 pound-for-pound Juan Manuel Márquez, at a catch weight of 144 lb on July 18 at the MGM Grand in Las Vegas on HBO PPV. The fight was postponed due to a rib injury Mayweather received during training. HBO's sports series 24/7 was also rescheduled for August 29. The fight took place on September 19 in conjunction with Mexican Independence Day, traditionally a big boxing weekend. During the official weigh-in for their 144 lb bout, Mayweather failed to meet the weight limit at 146 lb and was fined as a result. However, it was later revealed that the contract was changed so that Mayweather could make weight within the welterweight limit of 140–147 lb as long as Marquez received a large guarantee. Mayweather won a unanimous decision after 12 rounds in a lopsided fight; scorecards read 120–107, 119–108, and 118–109. Marquez landed 12 percent of his total 583 punches, while Mayweather landed 59 percent of his 490 total punches. This fight marked only the fifth time in boxing history that a non-heavyweight fight sold more than 1 million pay-per-view households, with HBO generating a revenue of approximately $52 million. Four of the other fights featured Oscar De La Hoya as the main event, making this fight the one of two events where a non-heavyweight fight sold over 1 million PPVs without Oscar De La Hoya. The other fight was Manny Pacquiao versus Miguel Cotto, which sold 1.25 million PPVs.

==== Mayweather vs. Mosley ====
Negotiations for a proposed match between Mayweather and The Ring #3 pound-for-pound Shane Mosley began right after Andre Berto pulled out of his scheduled January 30 unification bout with Mosley due to the 2010 Haiti earthquake. Both sides eventually agreed to fight on May 1, 2010, for Mosley's WBA super-welterweight title. It was later revealed that Mayweather refused to pay sanctioning fees required by the WBA, saying "All belts do is collect dust". However, the belt was only on the line for Mosley to defend against Mayweather. Both Mayweather and Mosley agreed to Olympic-style testing for this bout.

Mosley started the fight well, landing two solid right hands in round two which caused Mayweather's knees to buckle. Mayweather recovered well and went on to dominate the remainder of the fight, out-boxing Mosley and showing more aggression than in his previous recent fights. Mayweather eventually won a unanimous decision, with the judges scoring the fight 119–109, 119–109, and 118–110. In round four CompuBox found Mosley throwing seven power punches without landing any, making Mayweather the second boxer (after Roy Jones Jr.) to go an entire round without being hit by a power punch. After the fight, president of Golden Boy Promotions Oscar De La Hoya stated that he believed Mayweather was the best in the game.

The fight was the second-bestselling non-heavyweight pay-per-view bout in boxing history, with 1.4 million purchases. HBO reported that the fight generated $78.3 million in revenue. After the bout Mayweather expressed interest in moving up in weight to capture a world title in six different weight classes, and to challenge newly crowned middleweight champion Sergio Martínez.

==== Negotiations with Pacquiao ====
On December 5, 2009, ESPN reported that eight-division world champion Manny Pacquiao had allegedly signed a contract to fight Floyd Mayweather on March 13, 2010. However, Pacquiao denied this, stating that negotiations were still ongoing, telling FanHouse, "There are still some things that need to be negotiated."

On December 11, 2009, an eight-page contract was sent by Golden Boy Promotions on behalf of Mayweather to Top Rank, representing Pacquiao, proposing a 50–50 financial split between the sides for a fight on March 13, 2010. The contract was so detailed that it indicated who would step onto the scale first at the weigh-in (Pacquiao), who would walk to the ring first (Pacquiao), who would be introduced first (Mayweather), and who had first choice of the locker room (Mayweather). It specified that the bout would be on HBO Pay-Per-View at a cost of $59.95. The contract also called for both fighters to submit to Olympic-style drug testing.

The fight was expected to be the largest-grossing bout in history, with total revenues projected to reach $300 million, and experts predicted it would sell between 2.5 million and 3 million pay-per-views in the U.S.

On December 11, 2009, in a video titled "Boxing Legend Freddie Roach Updates Us On Pacquiao" uploaded to YouTube, Pacquiao's trainer, Freddie Roach, mentioned the first hint about Mayweather's request for Olympic-style drug testing. He indicated that while they had agreed to this request, Mayweather's camp appeared to be backing away again.

On December 13, 2009, Pacquiao's adviser, Michael Koncz, dismissed Mayweather's request for Olympic-style drug testing as inconsequential, stating, "Our reaction is, 'So what?' We know Manny doesn't take any illegal drugs or anything."

After reports surfaced that both parties had agreed to all terms, Golden Boy Promotions released a press release on December 22, 2009, revealing that Pacquiao was unwilling to comply with the Olympic-style drug testing requested by Team Mayweather. The next day, Bob Arum, Top Rank founder and CEO, declared the fight was off, citing Mayweather's insistence on drug testing as a tactic to derail the fight. Arum later set a 24-hour deadline for Mayweather to accept their terms, which included three blood tests—one in January, one 30 days before the fight, and one immediately after the fight. Arum claimed that the USADA's procedures were too invasive and insisted on using another independent agency.

Both sides eventually agreed to enter mediation on January 7, 2010, with retired federal judge Daniel Weinstein acting as mediator. However, negotiations broke down two days later when Mayweather refused to compromise on the 24-day cut-off date for blood testing. Mayweather subsequently announced that all his future fights would include random drug testing.

After the failed negotiations, Pacquiao went on to defeat Joshua Clottey on March 13, 2010, while Mayweather beat Shane Mosley on May 1, 2010. The fight between Pacquiao and Mayweather remained elusive for several more years, with disputes over drug testing and financial splits continuing to be a major obstacle.

=== Return to the ring ===
==== Mayweather vs. Ortiz ====
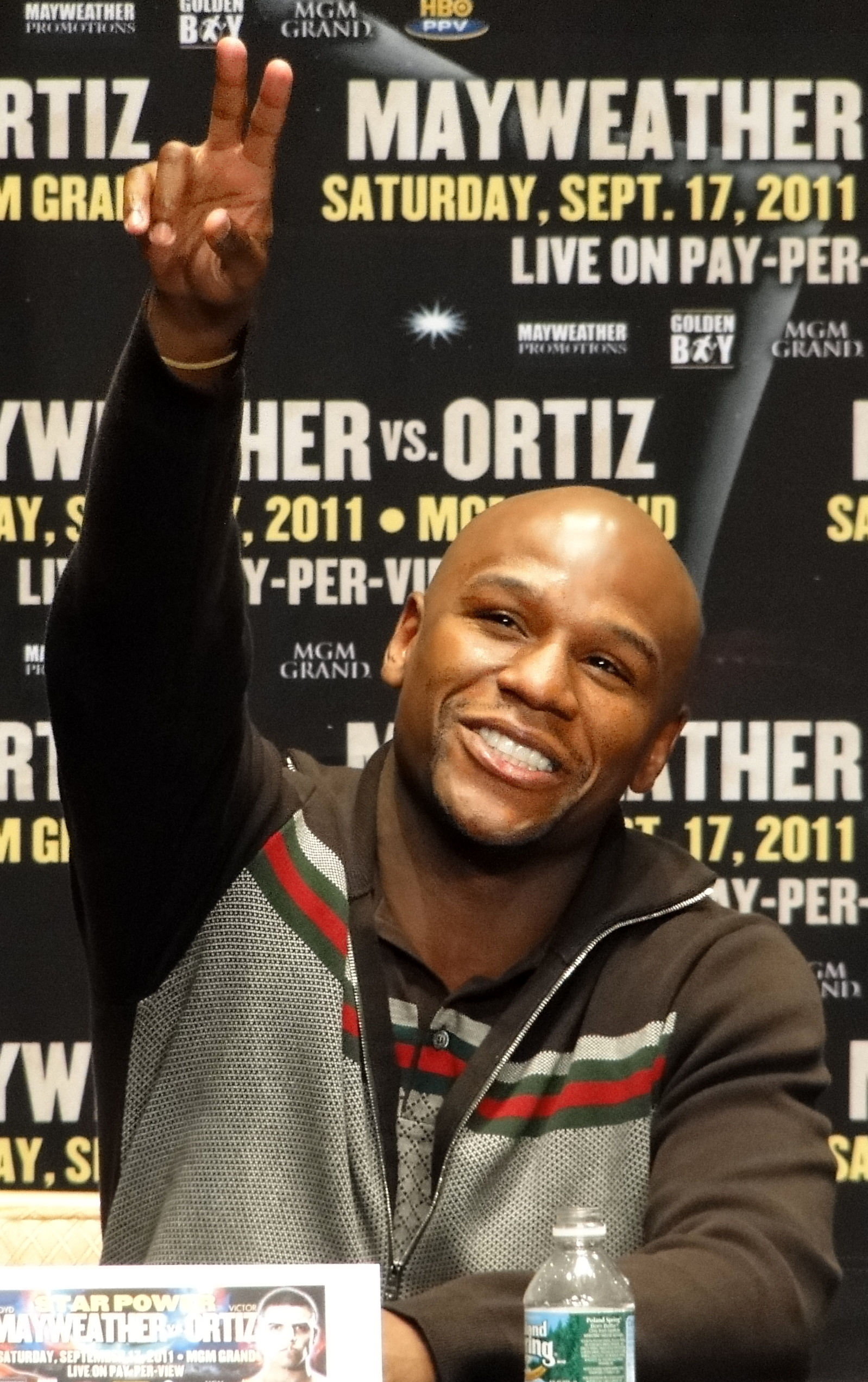
Mayweather photographed at the Mayweather–Ortiz press conference on June 28, 2011

On June 7, 2011, Mayweather announced via Twitter that he was set to fight WBC welterweight champion and The Ring #2-ranked welterweight Victor Ortiz on September 17. Ortiz was Mayweather's first challenger in 16 months. The fight took place at the MGM Grand Garden Arena. From round one, Mayweather used his speed, skills and accurate right hand to tag Ortiz repeatedly. Mayweather seemed in control through the first three rounds, judges' scores were 30–27, 30–27, and 29–28 for Mayweather, in the fourth round Ortiz had some success, landing a few shots and stinging Mayweather before bulling him into the corner. He then rammed Mayweather in the face with an intentional headbutt, opening a cut on the inside and outside of Mayweather's mouth. Referee Joe Cortez immediately called time out and docked Ortiz a point for the blatant foul. Ortiz, apparently acknowledging his wrongdoing, hugged Mayweather in the corner and even appeared to kiss him.

Cortez motioned the fighters back together to resume the fight, without putting them in a neutral corner. Both fighters touched gloves, and Ortiz gave Mayweather another hug. At that moment, Cortez was not looking at the fighters. As Ortiz let go, Mayweather took advantage of Ortiz not having his hands up and unloaded a left hook which wobbled Ortiz. Ortiz then looked at the referee, and Mayweather connected with a flush right hand to Ortiz's face. Ortiz fell to the canvas, and was unable to beat Cortez's count as the crowd of 14,687 jeered Mayweather. After the fight Ortiz claimed that he was merely obeying the referee's instructions when he was "blindsided" by Mayweather, who defended his actions by saying that "In the ring, you have to protect yourself at all times".

Mayweather vs. Ortiz was purchased by 1.25 million homes with a value of $78,440,000 in pay-per-view revenue. These numbers make the event the second-highest-grossing non-heavyweight pay-per-view event of all time. Mayweather has appeared in the three biggest non-heavyweight pay-per-view events in the sport's history: Mayweather vs. Oscar De La Hoya ($136,853,700), Mayweather vs. Ortiz ($78,440,000), and Mayweather vs. Shane Mosley ($78,330,000).

=== Return to light middleweight ===
==== Mayweather vs. Cotto ====
Mayweather's adviser, Leonard Ellerbe, announced on November 2, 2011, that Mayweather would return to the ring on May 5, 2012, at the MGM Grand Garden Arena in Las Vegas. After negotiations with Manny Pacquiao failed again, on February 1, 2012, it was confirmed that Mayweather would be moving up in weight to fight WBA super welterweight champion and The Ring #1-ranked light middleweight Miguel Cotto. The WBC put their super welterweight diamond belt at stake.

On the evening of Saturday, May 5, Mayweather defeated Cotto in 12 rounds by a unanimous decision, improving his record to 43–0. Mayweather used movement and outboxed Cotto in the middle of the ring for the first few rounds. Beginning in rounds three and four Cotto cut the ring off from Mayweather, forcing the latter to fight from the ropes. However, Mayweather seemed to outfight Cotto from the ropes with his combinations and by rolling with most of Cotto's punches. Cotto had more success in the middle rounds, landing his jab and body shots on Mayweather and effectively trapping him on the ropes. The later rounds were controlled by Mayweather, who boxed more in the center of the ring late in the fight. In the 12th round Mayweather's uppercut stunned and hurt Cotto, but Cotto was able to fight until the end. The judges scored the fight a unanimous decision for Mayweather by scores of 118–110, 117–111, and 117–111. After the fight, Mayweather said Cotto was the toughest fighter he ever faced.

CompuBox had Mayweather outlanding and outworking Cotto in the fight by a significant margin. Mayweather landed 26 percent of his total punches (179 out of 687), compared with 21 percent (105 out of 506) for Cotto. In power punches, Mayweather landed 128 of 382 (34 percent), compared with 75 of 329 (23 percent) for Cotto. Mayweather earned the biggest guaranteed purse in boxing history ($32 million) when he fought Cotto, according to contracts filed with the Nevada State Athletic Commission. The Mayweather-Cotto fight generated $94 million in PPV revenue from 1.5 million purchases, making it the second-biggest non-heavyweight fight in history (after Mayweather's fight with Oscar De La Hoya).

=== Return to welterweight ===
==== Mayweather vs. Guerrero ====
Mayweather returned to the ring on May 4, 2013, at the MGM Grand Garden Arena to face the WBC interim welterweight champion, Ring No. 3 ranked welterweight, and the WBC's mandatory challenger Robert Guerrero. This was Mayweather's first fight since being released from jail, and was the first time Mayweather has fought on Showtime PPV after a long relationship with HBO. Mayweather was guaranteed $32 million for the fight.

The fight took place in front of 15,880 at the MGM Grand Garden Arena. Prior to the fight, Guerrero had not lost in 8 years. The first couple rounds were fairly even, with Mayweather attempting to counter and time Guerrero, while Guerrero was attempting to drive Mayweather to the ropes and make it a rough fight. After the first couple rounds, Mayweather was in complete control, almost hitting Guerrero at will with right hand leads, counters, hooks, and effectively timing Guerrero the rest of the fight. Mayweather won the fight on all three scorecards 117–111. Mayweather outlanded Guerrero 195 punches to 113, which included a rare 60% connect on his power shots.

Although no official tallies are reported, according to Showtime Sports executive Stephen Espinoza, the fight had exceeded 1 million purchases in PPV.

=== Catchweight ===
==== Mayweather vs. Álvarez ====
Mayweather confirmed via Twitter that a deal was reached to face Ring No. 10 ranked pound for pound, WBC and WBA Super welterweight champion Saúl "Canelo" Álvarez in a championship bout on September 14, 2013, at the MGM Grand Garden Arena. A catchweight of 152 pounds was established for the fight. Mayweather received a boxing record $41.5 million for the Alvarez fight, according to Leonard Ellerbe, Mayweather's confidant. In front of a sold-out crowd of 16,746 at the MGM Garden, Mayweather defeated Álvarez by majority twelve-round decision. In a fight that many thought was going to be Mayweather's toughest, he outclassed the younger Álvarez. Many observers at ringside thought Mayweather won all twelve rounds. Judge C. J. Ross scored the fight 114–114, a draw. Judge Dave Moretti had it 116–112, and Craig Metcalfe scored it 117–111. Judge Ross retired after this fight. Speaking of the controversial scorecard, Mayweather said, "I can't control what the judges do." Compubox stats showed Mayweather's dominance in the fight, landed 232 of 505 punches (46%) and 117 connected of 526 thrown (22%) for Álvarez, who earned a base purse of $5 million.

=== Return to welterweight ===
==== Mayweather vs. Maidana ====
Despite interest in a bout with Amir Khan, Mayweather announced that he would fight 30-year-old Marcos Maidana (35–3, 31 KOs) on May 3, 2014, in a unification bout at MGM Grand Garden Arena, with Mayweather's WBC and The Ring welterweight titles at stake, as well as Maidana's WBA welterweight title. Maidana won the WBA title in December 2013 against Mayweather's friend, Adrien Broner. Mayweather tweeted the news the day after his 37th birthday. The Barclays Center in Brooklyn also made a case to showcase the fight. Mayweather explained why he chose Maidana, "Marcos Maidana's last performance immediately brought him to my attention. He is an extremely skilled fighter who brings knockout danger to the ring. I think this is a great fight for me and he deserves the opportunity to see if he can do what 45 others have tried to do before him – beat me." Maidana was a 12-to-1 underdog going into the fight.

In front of a sold-out crowd of 16,268, in what was one of his toughest fights, Mayweather won the bout via majority decision, with scores of 114–114, 117–111, and 116–112. Maidana came out aggressive and maintained that stance throughout the fight forcing Mayweather to engage. CompuBox revealed that Mayweather was hit more times than any of his previous 38 bouts that have been covered by them. Mayweather landed 230 of his 426 punches thrown (54%) while Maidana landed 221 of 858 (26%). Many times in the fight Maidana threw shots at different angles, forcing Mayweather against the ropes. According to Mayweather in the post-fight interview, Maidana's aggressive approach made him change his style of fighting.

Maidana was guaranteed a purse of $1.5 million, which would also include TV revenue from his native Argentina and PPV share. Mayweather earned a minimum $32 million. There were calls for an immediate rematch. Mayweather said, "He put pressure on me and that's when I decided to fight differently," Mayweather said. "I stood there and fought him. He's a good fighter, I take nothing away from him [...] This was a tough, competitive fight. This is what fans want to see. "I want to give fans an exciting fight. Normally, I box and move. Tonight, I gave fans an exciting fight." Maidana felt he won the fight, believing he gave Mayweather his toughest fight ever. Speaking through a translator, he said, "I definitely think I won. Floyd had never been hit by a man before. I had to change the gloves [after a last-minute problem with his original gloves on Friday] and I still gave him a great fight. He did dominate some rounds but the majority, I dominated them."

The fight generated around 900,000 PPV buys, although exact figures were not released by Showtime. The revenue of PPV sale amounted to $58 million.

==== Mayweather vs. Maidana II ====
On July 10, 2014, Mayweather made the announcement that a rematch with Maidana (35–4, 31 KOs) was confirmed. The fight was to take place on September 13, 2014, at the MGM Grand Garden Arena, with Mayweather's WBA (Super), WBC and The Ring welterweight titles at stake, as well as Mayweather's WBC light middleweight title. The fight was billed as "Mayhem".

In front of 16,144 at the MGM Grand, Mayweather defeated Maidana via unanimous decision. Unlike the first fight, Mayweather came out better prepared for Maidana's style. The final judges' scores were 115–112, 116–111, and 116–111. ESPN scored it wider for Mayweather at 119–108. Mayweather did not allow Maidana to land any overhand right, with the punch stats showing Maidana connecting 128 of 572 shots (22%). Mayweather had 51% connect rate landing 166 of 326.

A bizarre moment occurred in round 8, whilst in a headlock, Maidana appeared to have bitten Mayweather's left hand. Mayweather explained this in the post fight, "I didn't know what it was. Something happened and then my fingers were numb. After the eighth round my fingers were numb. I could only use my other hand. He bit me. I realized he bit me. We were tangled in the middle of the ring and all of a sudden I felt something on my left hand." Maidana denied the bite, "Maybe he thinks I'm a dog, but I never bit him. He was rubbing my eyes that round. He may have had his glove in my mouth, but I never bit him." After round 9, Maidana appeared to be confused as he started walking towards the wrong corner. Mayweather immediately ran towards him to point to his corner, much to the amusement of the crowd. Maidana was unhappy with the final verdict and thought he won the fight, "If the judges want to give the fight to fighters that run, they can give it to him. I was attacking all the time. Maybe I'm wrong, but I thought that I was the aggressor. I kept my plan to be aggressive but he kept holding and pushing. I don't want to waste my time with a third fight. I trained with all my heart to get this type of result. This is not fair. There's not reason for another fight." For the sequel, Mayweather earned a minimum of $32 million and Maidana earned a career high $3 million.

The fight did well on PPV, a reported 925,000 households bought the fight, generating $60 million. The live gate grossed nearly $15 million, putting it at number 5 in the top 35 boxing gates.

==== Mayweather vs. Pacquiao ====
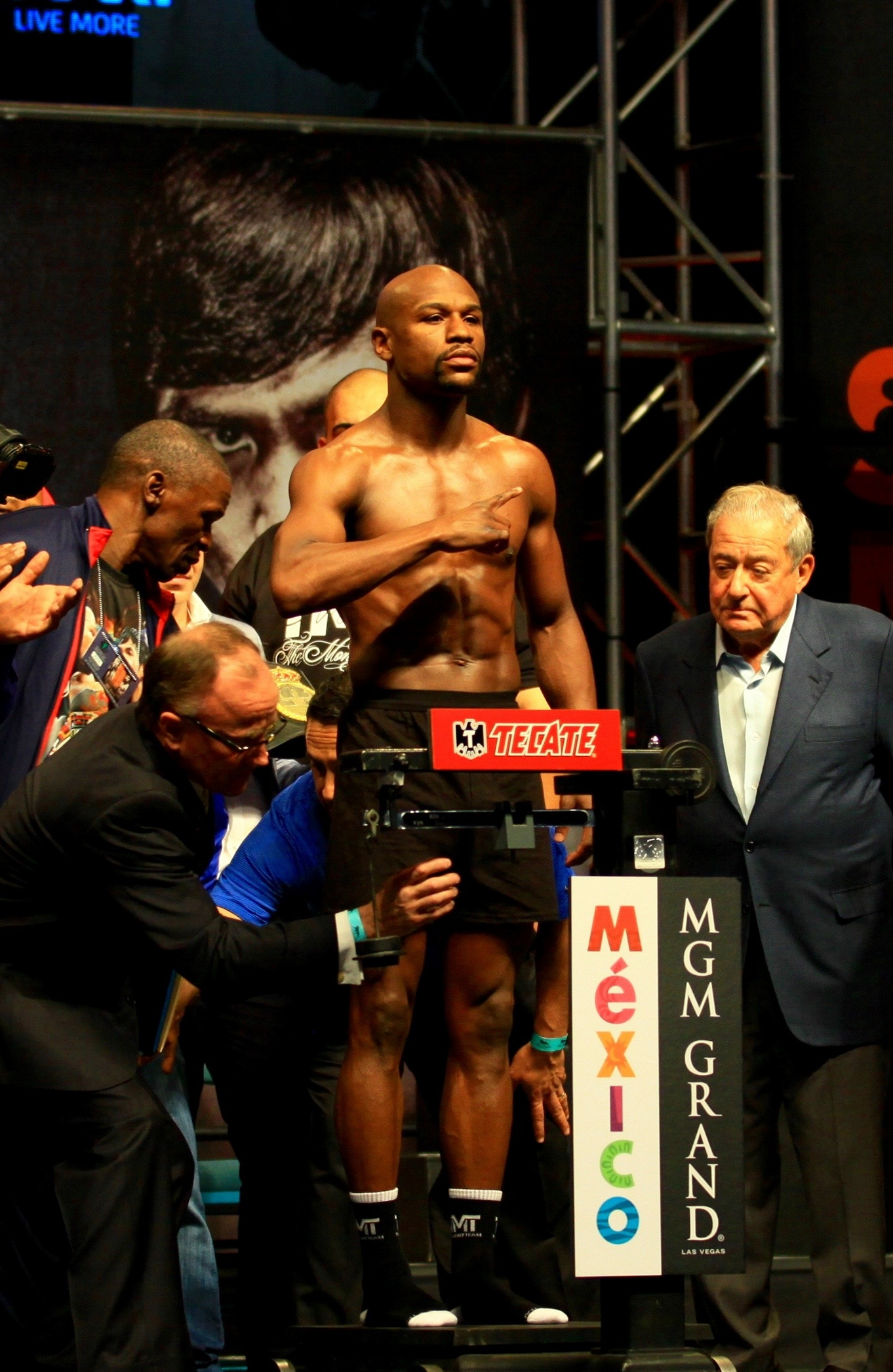
Mayweather weighing in against Pacquiao, 2015

Mayweather fought Manny Pacquiao on May 2, 2015, at MGM Grand Garden Arena in Las Vegas, after several negotiations spread over years. Mayweather dictated the pace early, controlling range with the jab. His deft movement and pivoting made Pacquiao consistently miss, landing only 19% of his punches. Mayweather was able to counter Pacquiao with his right hand throughout the fight and won via unanimous decision with the scorecards reading 118–110, 116–112, and 116–112. The vast majority of media outlets (16/18) scored the bout in his favor. Many observers felt the match failed to live up to expectations. Pacquiao told the media after the match that he was limited in the fight due to an injured right arm. Sports Illustrated reported that Pacquiao fought through a torn rotator cuff in his right shoulder, which will require surgery. Bob Arum revealed Pacquiao's injury to have been a persistent one dating back to 2008. Mayweather, who originally had no plans for a rematch with Pacquiao, told ESPN's Stephen A. Smith in a text that he would be open to a rematch after Pacquiao recovers from shoulder surgery, however as of May 9, 2015, Mayweather stated "Did I text Stephen A. Smith and say I will fight him again? Yeah, but I change my mind. At this particular time, no, because he's a sore loser and he's a coward." On July 6, 2015, the World Boxing Organization (WBO) stripped Mayweather of his welterweight championship because he was not permitted to hold titles in multiple weight classes, and because he failed to pay a sanctioning fee.

=== Second retirement ===
==== Mayweather vs. Berto ====
Mayweather confirmed through Instagram that he would defend the WBC, WBA (Super), and The Ring welterweight titles against WBA interim champion Andre Berto on September 12, 2015, at the MGM Grand Garden Arena. The announcement received some backlash due to Berto being (3–3) in his last 6 fights. Many felt he wasn't a credible opponent. Welterweight contender Amir Khan was said to be disappointed with the selection. Berto believed Mayweather chose him as his final opponent for personal reasons, which could date back to when he won the National Golden Gloves tournament.

Mayweather was able to pinpoint holes in Berto's guard and find a home for the jab early. He landed sharp counters and feint hooks while controlling range for the vast majority of the bout. Berto pushed the pace, but his aggressiveness fell short as Mayweather was highly mobile and closed the distance consistently. Mayweather hurt his left hand at the end of the ninth round but remained comfortable throughout the rest of the fight, winning via unanimous decision 117–111, 118–110, and 120–108. Mayweather dominated the fight, landing an impressive 56% [232/410] punches thrown, compared to Berto's underwhelming number of 17% [83/495] punches landed.

Early industry sources reported the fight drew 550,000 buys. Later sources indicated the number could have been as low as 400,000 buys, generating $28 million. This was the lowest number of buys Floyd had generated in over 10 years. The fight also gathered a crowd of 13,395, also a decreased figure compared to Mayweather previous fights.

Mayweather announced his retirement in the ring after defeating Berto, walking away from the sport with an undefeated record of 49–0. The WBC declared his welterweight and super welterweight titles vacant in November 2015.

=== Second comeback and third retirement ===
==== Mayweather vs. McGregor ====
The idea of a Mayweather comeback floated around April 2016, as rumors of Mayweather Promotions filing for trademarks of "TBE 50" and "TMT 50" hinted that Mayweather might have been targeting that 50th win. This was confirmed by posts from the U.S. Patent and Trademark website.

Around May 2016, another rumor started that a crossover fight between Mayweather and MMA star Conor McGregor was in the works. On May 7, 2016, Mayweather confirmed that he was the one who started the rumors regarding the potential clash. Mayweather followed it through with an Instagram post of an unofficial teaser poster showcasing both fighters. Dana White dismissed all the rumors and stated that Mayweather had yet to contact him in case he wanted the fight to push through, since McGregor was in contract with the UFC. On January 13, 2017, White continued his stance against a Mayweather-McGregor boxing matchup and insisted that, because of McGregor's contract, it would never happen and even went as far as offering Mayweather to box McGregor in the UFC for $25 million.

On March 7, 2017, Mayweather urged McGregor to sign the contract, hinting that a fight was really in the works. On March 10, 2017, Mayweather stated that only a fight with McGregor would make him come out of retirement. On March 16, 2017, Dana White backpedaled on his stance against Mayweather fighting McGregor and said that he would not deprive McGregor of making a massive payday. On May 18, 2017, McGregor reportedly agreed to all of Mayweather's updated terms and signed the contract.

On June 14, 2017, after months of negotiations, both fighters announced via their Twitter accounts that they would fight on August 26, 2017, at the T-Mobile Arena in Las Vegas, Nevada. On August 24, 2017, it was announced that Mayweather and McGregor would be facing off for the WBC Money Belt, specifically made for the fight. According to the Nevada State Athletic Commission, Mayweather would earn a guaranteed purse of $100 million and McGregor was guaranteed $30 million.

In front of a crowd of 14,623, Mayweather won via TKO in the 10th round, surpassing Rocky Marciano and setting the record for the longest active unbeaten streak in a professional career at 50–0. In the opening round, Mayweather, as per previous fights, started slow to work out McGregor's tactics. In his post-fight interview, he revealed it was part of the game plan to let McGregor punch himself out in the early rounds. McGregor won the first round on all three judges' scorecards; the same case could have been made for the opening three rounds. McGregor was warned a few times through the fight for hitting behind the head, but no points were deducted by referee Robert Byrd. By the fourth round, McGregor began to tire and breathe heavily with his mouth open. Mayweather started to take control and landed with his right hands. For the next few rounds, McGregor came out throwing shots in the opening 30 seconds, but immediately tired, giving Mayweather enough time to carry on landing clean shots and winning the rounds. By round 9, McGregor had almost nothing left. Although he didn't look hurt, he was very fatigued and his face started showing redness. Two of the judges scored the round 10–8 for Mayweather. In round 10, McGregor staggered across the ring and was in a bad way against the ropes as Mayweather landed some hard shots. With McGregor barely on his feet after a few unanswered punches, the referee waved the fight off. The time of stoppage was 1 minute and 5 seconds of round 10.

At the time of stoppage, the scorecards read 87–83, 89–82, and 89–81, all in favor of Mayweather. McGregor was praised by Dana White at the post-fight press conference for landing 111 punches of 430 thrown (26%) on Mayweather, more than what Pacquiao or any of Mayweather's previous nine opponents had landed. Mayweather was more than twice as accurate, however, landing 170 of 320 punches thrown (53%).

Mayweather said of the fight, "This was my last fight. Tonight, ladies and gentlemen, for sure I chose the right dance partner to dance with. Conor McGregor, you are a hell of a champion." He added, "He's a tough competitor and I think we gave the fans what they wanted to see. I owed them for the Pacquiao fight. I must come straight ahead and give the fans a show, and that's what I gave them." McGregor felt the fight was stopped prematurely, but nevertheless respected the decision and admitted he was tired. Mayweather agreed with the stoppage, and explained that he avoided inflicting more damage on McGregor to protect him from brain damage, saying "He has a career. You know, he still has a career. ...(It could've been) very damaging."

Nevada State Athletic Commission announced the live gate for the event was $55,414,865.79 from 13,094 tickets sold and 137 complimentary tickets given out. It was the second-largest gate ever for a combat sporting event, behind only the Mayweather vs. Pacquiao fight, which grossed just over $72 million from a paid attendance of 16,219 in 2015. Sky Sports announced the fight garnered over a million PPV buys in the UK and grossed in excess of £20 million, surpassing the record set in April 2017 when Anthony Joshua defeated Wladimir Klitschko in front of 90,000 at the Wembley Stadium. This also meant the fight generated more buys in the UK than Mayweather-Pacquiao which took place in 2015.

Mayweather reportedly earned over $300 million from the fight, while McGregor earned around $100 million.

=== Third comeback ===
==== Mayweather vs. Pacquiao II ====
On February 20, 2026, Mayweather announced his return to the ring as a professional boxer for the first time since 2017. Mayweather planned his return following his exhibition fight against Mike Tyson which had been initially set to take place in April 2026. On February 23, he announced that he would fight a rematch with Manny Pacquiao on September 19, 2026, which was set to be streamed live on Netflix. However, this planned rematch with Pacquiao would be delayed until at least 2027 after Mayweather was sued for breach of contract obligations.

== Exhibition bouts ==
=== Mayweather vs. Nasukawa ===
In September 2018, during the electronic music festival Ultra Japan, both Mayweather and Pacquiao posted videos of encounters at the festival, which implicated the possibility of a rematch. It is unknown if any formal negotiations occurred.

On September 19, 2018, Mayweather stated in an interview that, despite references to "this year" in the videos, he planned to hold a fight in Japan before any possible rematch with Pacquiao. On October 18, 2018, Pacquiao told the Daily Mirror that a rumoured rematch with Mayweather would occur in 2019, as Mayweather was planning to fight an unnamed opponent on December 31, 2018. On November 5, 2018, the Japanese MMA promotion Rizin Fighting Federation announced that Mayweather would face undefeated kickboxer Tenshin Nasukawa at Rizin 14 on December 31, 2018, under unspecified rules. Of the bout, Mayweather stated in a press conference that "it wasn't easy to make this happen, but we told the people anything is possible, so now we're here and we wanna make sure that we give the people in Tokyo what they wanna see — blood, sweat and tears."

However, two days later, Mayweather denied that he would be fighting Nasukawa. He explained that he had been booked for a non-televised exhibition for "a small group of wealthy spectators" during the event, but that he was caught off-guard by the announcement that he would face Nasukawa—claiming that he was unaware of the fighter until the press conference, and stating that "for the sake of the several fans and attendees that flew in from all parts of the world to attend this past press conference, I was hesitant to create a huge disturbance by combating what was being said and for that I am truly sorry."

On November 16, 2018, Mayweather confirmed that a three-round exhibition boxing match against Nasukawa would indeed happen after the initial misunderstanding had been resolved.

The fight took place at the Saitama Super Arena in Japan on December 31 and ended on a TKO in the first round, when Nasukawa's corner waved off the fight after he had been knocked down three times. After the fight, Mayweather clarified that he is still retired and only did the fight to entertain fans. The match and its ending, however, were controversial, and drew condemnation and accusations of match-fixing. Mayweather reportedly earned $9 million for the fight.

=== Mayweather vs. Paul ===
On December 6, 2020, it was announced that Mayweather would face internet personality Logan Paul in an exhibition bout on February 20, 2021. The fight was postponed, and took place on June 6, 2021, at Hard Rock Stadium in Miami Gardens, Florida. On May 6, 2021, Mayweather and Paul met for the first time at a press conference at Hard Rock Stadium, where the latter's brother, Jake Paul, became involved in an angry brawl with Mayweather when he removed Mayweather's hat from his head. A visibly irate Mayweather was captured on video saying, "I'll kill you motherfucker! Are you crazy? I'll fuck you up, motherfucker. I don't play motherfucking games. I'll fuck you up."

The bout consisted of constant clinching initiated by Paul and went the full distance to the sound of boos from the crowd, with no winner being announced. Mayweather had started tentatively and defensively, reluctant to throw often and avoiding most of Paul's shots. Toward the end of the first round, Paul unleashed a wild flurry, but most of his punches were blocked by Mayweather's guard. The second round was similar to the first, with Mayweather content with the slow pace of the fight. He finally turned up the offense in the third, opening up with some clean left hooks that rocked Paul's head back, as well as mixing in his trademark pull counter with the right hand. From the fourth round onward, Paul was visibly fatigued and took every opportunity to utilize his weight advantage by tying the smaller Mayweather up in the clinch after every exchange. Despite Paul's constant attempts at neutering Mayweather's offense, the latter continued to dictate the pace of the fight and land the cleaner, more effective punches. Toward the end of the eighth and final round, Paul showboated when it became clear that he had done enough to avoid being stopped as most had predicted would be the case, and that he would survive to hear the final bell. Mayweather's superior boxing was reflected by the CompuBox punch stats, with Mayweather having landed 43 punches of 107 thrown (40.2%), compared to Paul's 28 landed of 217 thrown (12.9%).

In his post-fight interview, Mayweather praised his opponent, saying "He's better than I thought he was... he's a tough, rough competitor." Paul appeared to harbor some doubt about how seriously Mayweather had taken the fight, saying "I'm going to go home thinking, 'Did Floyd let me survive?'" When asked about the prospect of making a return to professional boxing, Mayweather replied, "I'm not coming back to the sport of boxing, absolutely not." He did not completely rule out participating in exhibition bouts in the future, saying "As far as me doing another exhibition, probably not".

=== Mayweather vs. Moore ===
On May 21, 2022, Mayweather fought an eight-round exhibition boxing bout with one of his former sparring partners, Don Moore, in Abu Dhabi. Mayweather was in full control of the fight including scoring a knockdown to Moore with a punch to the body in the eighth round. Moore survived the knockdown and would go the full distance, but there was no scoring and it ended without an official verdict.

=== Mayweather vs. Asakura ===
On June 13, 2022, Mayweather announced he would be returning for another exhibition bout. The fight would be at the Rizin event scheduled on September 25, 2022, at the Saitama Super Arena. His opponent was confirmed to be Japanese mixed martial artist and YouTuber Mikuru Asakura. Mayweather won by TKO in the 2nd round.

=== Mayweather vs. Deji ===
On September 25, 2022, Mayweather announced he would be facing YouTuber Deji Olatunji, the younger brother of KSI. The fight was scheduled for November 13, 2022, at the Coca-Cola Arena in Dubai. Mayweather defeated Deji via technical knockout in the 6th round.

=== Mayweather vs. Chalmers ===
In January 2023, it was announced that Mayweather would be fighting another exhibition bout against former Bellator MMA fighter and television personality Aaron Chalmers, after his original opponent for the fight, ONE Championship Muay Thai fighter Liam Harrison, pulled out due to a knee injury. The bout took place on February 25, 2023, at The O2 Arena in London, England, marking it as Mayweather's first exhibition bout in the United Kingdom. The bout went the full 8 rounds, there was no scoring and it ended without an official verdict.

=== Mayweather vs. Gotti III ===
On April 26, 2023, it was announced that Mayweather would be facing professional mixed martial artist and boxer John Gotti III – the grandson and son of mafiosi John Gotti and John A. Gotti, respectively – in an exhibition boxing match on June 11, 2023. The bout – held at the FLA Live Arena in Sunrise, Florida – was stopped by referee Kenny Bayless in the sixth round, prompting a ring invasion by members of each boxer's teams. A number of fights subsequently broke out in the crowd and backstage.

=== Mayweather vs. Gotti III II ===
On June 21, 2024, a rematch between Floyd Mayweather Jr and John Gotti III was confirmed for August 24, 2024, at Arena CDMX in Mexico City, Mexico. The bout went the full eight rounds and no winner was declared.

=== Mayweather vs. Tyson ===
On September 4, 2025, it was announced that Mayweather and Mike Tyson have agreed to fight each other in an exhibition bout some time in Spring 2026. However, this planned exhibition bout would be repeatedly delayed after Tyson was confirmed to have broke his hand while training. As of May 21, 2026, Mayweather's planned exhibition bout with Tyson is currently planned to take place in the fall of 2026. However, Mayweather would later be sued for breach of contract after attempting to secure a fight with Greek kickboxer Mike Zambidis. In June 2026, Mayweather was revealed to be by now more adamant on securing a fight with Zambidis. While Mayweather's planned bout with Zambidis in June 2026 was cancelled due to contract obligations with CSI Sports events to fight both Tyson and Manny Pacquiao, a judge would later grant Mayweather a motion to pursue this fight. With Mayweather opting to instead focus more on pursuing a bout with Zambidis, and still being sued for breach of contract, the future of Mayweather's planned exhibition bout with Tyson was deemed uncertain, though Tyson made clear in an interview with Ring that he was still eager to participate in the planned exhibition fight with Mayweather.

=== Mayweather vs. Pacquiao II ===
In 2026, Mayweather committed to a rematch with Manny Pacquiao on September 19 at The Sphere in Las Vegas, according to a news release issued in February by Netflix, which would be Mayweather's first professional fight since 2017. However, Mayweather later stated the fight would be an exhibition, and was accused by the Pacquiao team of breaching the fight contract. In addition, Mayweather would later be sued by CSI Sports Events over his efforts to secure a bout with kickboxer Mike Zambidis. Mayweather's continuous efforts to secure a bout with Zambidis, and the breach of contract lawsuit from which stemmed from these efforts, cast the future of this planned exhibitions bout with Pacquiao into uncertainty. In June 2026, Mayweather's planned rematch with Pacquiao would be delayed until at least 2027.

== Entertainment career ==
=== WWE ===
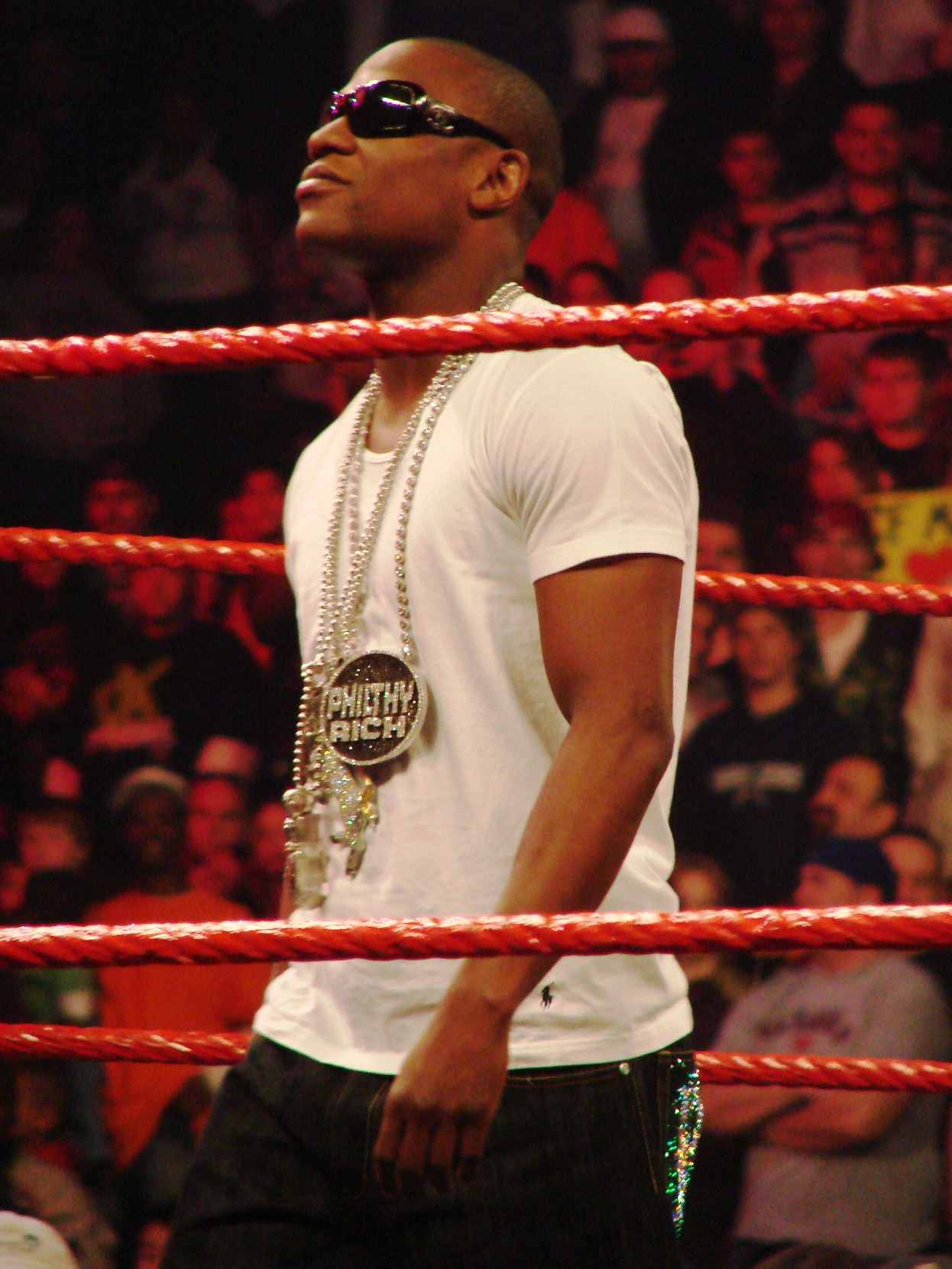
Mayweather during his brief tenure in WWE

Mayweather appeared at WWE's No Way Out pay-per-view event on February 17, 2008, in Las Vegas, Nevada. He was involved in a storyline altercation with Big Show when Mayweather jumped a security barricade and attacked Big Show to help Rey Mysterio, whom Show had threatened to chokeslam. Mayweather originally assumed a babyface role in the storylines, which met with some resistance from fans. The attack resulted in Big Show receiving a broken nose. The following night on Raw, Big Show challenged Mayweather to a one-on-one No Disqualification match at WrestleMania XXIV, which Mayweather accepted. At WrestleMania, Mayweather defeated Big Show in a knockout with brass knuckles to maintain his unbeaten record. Mayweather was reportedly paid $20 million for the fight. 1 million PPV buys were reported for WrestleMania XXIV, grossing $23.8 million in revenue.

Mayweather was guest host for Raw in Las Vegas on August 24, 2009. He interfered with a tag-team match, which resulted in a loss for the Big Show (again a heel) and his partner Chris Jericho as Mayweather gave MVP brass knuckles to knock Jericho out, giving MVP and his new tag-team partner Mark Henry the win and a shot at the Unified WWE Tag Team Titles at WWE Breaking Point against Jeri-Show. He then celebrated with Henry and MVP, turning face. Later that night, he was involved in a backstage segment with Vince McMahon, D-Generation X, and Carlito, helping McMahon prepare for his six-man tag team match against The Legacy and DX. During the segment, McMahon knocked out Carlito.

=== Dancing with the Stars ===
Mayweather appeared on the fifth season of Dancing with the Stars; his partner was Ukrainian-American professional ballroom dancer Karina Smirnoff. On October 16, 2007, Smirnoff and Mayweather were the fourth couple to be eliminated from the competition, finishing in ninth place.

== Personal life ==
Mayweather resides in a 22,000-square-foot (2,000 m^{2}), five-bedroom, seven-bath, custom-built mansion in Las Vegas. He owns the Mayweather Boxing Club, a boxing gym in Chinatown Plaza in Las Vegas.

In 2008, he recorded a rap song titled "Yep" that he used for his entrance on WrestleMania XXIV in his match against Big Show. In 2011, he paid for the funeral of former super lightweight world champion and opponent Genaro Hernandez, who died of cancer after a three-year battle. Mayweather owned a team in the NASCAR Cup Series named The Money Team Racing.

== Legal issues ==
=== Domestic violence and battery convictions ===
Mayweather has been convicted on multiple occasions of domestic violence and battery.

In 2002, Mayweather was charged with two counts of domestic violence and one count of misdemeanor battery. He received a six-month suspended sentence and two days of house arrest and was ordered to perform 48 hours of community service.

In 2004, Mayweather was given a one-year suspended jail sentence, ordered to undergo counseling for "impulse control" and pay a $1,000 fine (or perform 100 hours of community service) after being convicted of two counts of misdemeanor battery against two women.

In 2005, Mayweather pleaded no contest to a misdemeanor battery charge after hitting and kicking a bouncer, receiving a 90-day suspended jail sentence.

On September 9, 2010, it was reported that Mayweather was being sought by police for questioning after his former girlfriend, Josie Harris, filed a domestic battery report against him. Harris accused Mayweather of battery in the past, but those charges were dropped in July 2005 after Harris testified that she had lied and that Mayweather had not battered her. Mayweather was taken into custody September 10, 2010, but was released after posting $3,000 bail. Mayweather was initially charged with felony theft (stemming from the disappearance of Harris's mobile phone); on September 16 two felony coercion charges, one felony robbery charge, one misdemeanor domestic-battery charge and three misdemeanor harassment charges were added.

On December 21, 2011, a judge sentenced Mayweather to serve 90 days in the county jail for battery upon Harris in September 2010. Mayweather reached a deal with prosecutors in which he pleaded guilty to misdemeanor battery in exchange for prosecutors dropping the felony battery charge. Mayweather also pleaded no contest to two counts of misdemeanor harassment, stemming from threats to his children. In addition to the 90-day sentence, Mayweather was ordered to complete 100 hours of community service, a 12-month domestic-violence program and to pay a fine of $2,500.

On June 1, 2012, Mayweather reported to the Clark County Detention Center in Las Vegas to serve his jail term for domestic abuse. After serving two months, he was released from prison on August 3, 2012.

On February 4, 2015, Mayweather, who was planning to do a tour in Australia, was denied a visa on the basis of his criminal record and jail term.

=== Sued for defamation ===
In May 2015, following his bout against Pacquiao, Josie Harris sued Mayweather for $20 million for defamation, claiming that Mayweather lied during an interview with Katie Couric in April. During that interview, he called her a drug abuser while discussing the 2010 domestic-violence incident which ended up with Mayweather going to jail for two months.

=== 2018 SEC settlement ===
In November 2018, together with DJ Khaled, Mayweather agreed to a total settlement of $750,000 with the Securities and Exchange Commission (SEC) for failing to disclose payments accepted from issuers of initial coin offerings, including a personal $100,000 promotional payment from beleaguered cryptocurrency firm Centra Tech Inc., whose co-founders were indicted for fraud in May 2018. According to the SEC, "they are its first cases involving charges for violating rules on touting investments in so-called initial coin offerings, or ICOs." As part of the settlement, Mayweather undertook to forgo any endorsement or promotional agreement with a securities participant for three years.

=== 2022 EthereumMax lawsuit ===
In January 2022, in a class-action lawsuit filed against the cryptocurrency company EthereumMax that alleged the company is a pump and dump scheme, Mayweather was named as a defendant along with media personality Kim Kardashian, former NBA player Paul Pierce, and other celebrities for promoting the EthereumMax token on their social media accounts. In December 2022, Central California U.S. District Court Judge Michael W. Fitzgerald dismissed the lawsuit on the basis that the claims were insufficiently supported given heightened pleading standards for fraud.

=== 2026 fraud and theft allegations ===
In June 2026, Mayweather was reported to be facing two felony charges in Nevada stemming from an alleged December 2024 incident in which he purchased a $200,000 luxury watch in Las Vegas using a check from a Wells Fargo account that prosecutors claimed had insufficient funds. The charges included one count of felony theft involving property valued at more than $100,000 and one count of drawing or passing a check with intent to defraud. According to court filings, Mayweather was alleged to have obtained the watch knowing the check would not be honored, and the complaint was filed after the retailer's representatives initially attempted to resolve the issue privately and allow repayment, but proceeded with legal action after failing to receive payment or responses. Mayweather's attorney denied any intent to defraud. If convicted, he faced potential penalties of up to four years' imprisonment for the fraud-related offence and up to twenty years for the felony theft charge, in addition to possible fines and restitution.

== Professional boxing record ==
| 50 fights | 50 wins | 0 losses |
|---|---|---|
| By knockout | 27 | 0 |
| By decision | 23 | 0 |

| No. | Result | Record | Opponent | Type | Round, time | Date | Age | Location | Notes |
|---|---|---|---|---|---|---|---|---|---|
| 50 | Win | 50–0 | Conor McGregor | TKO | 10 (12), 1:05 | Aug 26, 2017 | 40 years, 183 days | T-Mobile Arena, Paradise, Nevada, U.S. | |
| 49 | Win | 49–0 | Andre Berto | UD | 12 | Sep 12, 2015 | 38 years, 200 days | MGM Grand Garden Arena, Paradise, Nevada, U.S. | Retained WBA (Unified), WBC, and The Ring welterweight titles |
| 48 | Win | 48–0 | Manny Pacquiao | UD | 12 | May 2, 2015 | 38 years, 67 days | MGM Grand Garden Arena, Paradise, Nevada, U.S. | Retained WBA (Unified), WBC, and The Ring welterweight titles; Won WBO welterweight title |
| 47 | Win | 47–0 | Marcos Maidana | UD | 12 | Sep 13, 2014 | 37 years, 201 days | MGM Grand Garden Arena, Paradise, Nevada, U.S. | Retained WBA (Unified), WBC, The Ring welterweight titles; and WBC light middleweight titles |
| 46 | Win | 46–0 | Marcos Maidana | MD | 12 | May 3, 2014 | 37 years, 68 days | MGM Grand Garden Arena, Paradise, Nevada, U.S. | Retained WBC and The Ring welterweight titles; Won WBA (Unified) welterweight title |
| 45 | Win | 45–0 | Canelo Álvarez | MD | 12 | Sep 14, 2013 | 36 years, 202 days | MGM Grand Garden Arena, Paradise, Nevada, U.S. | Retained WBA (Super) light middleweight title; Won WBC and The Ring light middleweight titles |
| 44 | Win | 44–0 | Robert Guerrero | UD | 12 | May 4, 2013 | 36 years, 69 days | MGM Grand Garden Arena, Paradise, Nevada, U.S. | Retained WBC welterweight title; Won vacant The Ring welterweight title |
| 43 | Win | 43–0 | Miguel Cotto | UD | 12 | May 5, 2012 | 35 years, 71 days | MGM Grand Garden Arena, Paradise, Nevada, U.S. | Won WBA (Super) light middleweight title |
| 42 | Win | 42–0 | Victor Ortiz | KO | 4 (12), 2:59 | Sep 17, 2011 | 34 years, 205 days | MGM Grand Garden Arena, Paradise, Nevada, U.S. | Won WBC welterweight title |
| 41 | Win | 41–0 | Shane Mosley | UD | 12 | May 1, 2010 | 33 years, 66 days | MGM Grand Garden Arena, Paradise, Nevada, U.S. | |
| 40 | Win | 40–0 | Juan Manuel Márquez | UD | 12 | Sep 19, 2009 | 32 years, 207 days | MGM Grand Garden Arena, Paradise, Nevada, U.S. | |
| 39 | Win | 39–0 | Ricky Hatton | TKO | 10 (12), 1:35 | Dec 8, 2007 | 30 years, 287 days | MGM Grand Garden Arena, Paradise, Nevada, U.S. | Retained WBC and The Ring welterweight titles |
| 38 | Win | 38–0 | Oscar De La Hoya | SD | 12 | May 5, 2007 | 30 years, 70 days | MGM Grand Garden Arena, Paradise, Nevada, U.S. | Won WBC light middleweight title |
| 37 | Win | 37–0 | Carlos Baldomir | UD | 12 | Nov 4, 2006 | 29 years, 253 days | Mandalay Bay Events Center, Paradise, Nevada, U.S. | Retained IBO welterweight title; Won WBC, IBA, and The Ring welterweight titles |
| 36 | Win | 36–0 | Zab Judah | UD | 12 | Apr 8, 2006 | 29 years, 43 days | Thomas & Mack Center, Paradise, Nevada, U.S. | Won IBF and vacant IBO welterweight titles |
| 35 | Win | 35–0 | Sharmba Mitchell | TKO | 6 (12), 2:06 | Nov 19, 2005 | 28 years, 268 days | Rose Garden, Portland, Oregon, U.S. | |
| 34 | Win | 34–0 | Arturo Gatti | RTD | 6 (12), 3:00 | Jun 25, 2005 | 28 years, 121 days | Boardwalk Hall, Atlantic City, New Jersey, U.S. | Won WBC super lightweight title |
| 33 | Win | 33–0 | Henry Bruseles | TKO | 8 (12), 2:55 | Jan 22, 2005 | 27 years, 333 days | American Airlines Arena, Miami, Florida, U.S. | |
| 32 | Win | 32–0 | DeMarcus Corley | UD | 12 | May 22, 2004 | 27 years, 88 days | Boardwalk Hall, Atlantic City, New Jersey, U.S. | |
| 31 | Win | 31–0 | Phillip N'dou | TKO | 7 (12), 1:08 | Nov 1, 2003 | 26 years, 250 days | Van Andel Arena, Grand Rapids, Michigan, U.S. | Retained WBC and The Ring lightweight titles |
| 30 | Win | 30–0 | Victoriano Sosa | UD | 12 | Apr 19, 2003 | 26 years, 54 days | Selland Arena, Fresno, California, U.S. | Retained WBC and The Ring lightweight titles |
| 29 | Win | 29–0 | José Luis Castillo | UD | 12 | Dec 7, 2002 | 25 years, 286 days | Mandalay Bay Events Center, Paradise, Nevada, U.S. | Retained WBC and The Ring lightweight titles |
| 28 | Win | 28–0 | José Luis Castillo | UD | 12 | Apr 20, 2002 | 25 years, 55 days | MGM Grand Garden Arena, Paradise, Nevada, U.S. | Won WBC and vacant The Ring lightweight titles |
| 27 | Win | 27–0 | Jesús Chávez | RTD | 9 (12), 3:00 | Nov 10, 2001 | 24 years, 259 days | Bill Graham Civic Auditorium, San Francisco, California, U.S. | Retained WBC super featherweight title |
| 26 | Win | 26–0 | Carlos Hernández | UD | 12 | May 26, 2001 | 24 years, 91 days | Van Andel Arena, Grand Rapids, Michigan, U.S. | Retained WBC super featherweight title |
| 25 | Win | 25–0 | Diego Corrales | TKO | 10 (12), 2:19 | Jan 20, 2001 | 23 years, 331 days | MGM Grand Garden Arena, Paradise, Nevada, U.S. | Retained WBC super featherweight title |
| 24 | Win | 24–0 | Emanuel Augustus | TKO | 9 (10), 1:06 | Oct 21, 2000 | 23 years, 240 days | Cobo Hall, Detroit, Michigan, U.S. | |
| 23 | Win | 23–0 | Gregorio Vargas | UD | 12 | Mar 18, 2000 | 23 years, 84 days | MGM Grand Garden Arena, Paradise, Nevada, U.S. | Retained WBC super featherweight title |
| 22 | Win | 22–0 | Carlos Gerena | RTD | 7 (12), 3:00 | Sep 11, 1999 | 22 years, 199 days | Mandalay Bay Events Center, Paradise, Nevada, U.S. | Retained WBC super featherweight title |
| 21 | Win | 21–0 | Justin Juuko | KO | 9 (12), 1:20 | May 22, 1999 | 22 years, 87 days | Mandalay Bay Events Center, Paradise, Nevada, U.S. | Retained WBC super featherweight title |
| 20 | Win | 20–0 | Carlos Rios | UD | 12 | Feb 17, 1999 | 21 years, 358 days | Van Andel Arena, Grand Rapids, Michigan, U.S. | Retained WBC super featherweight title |
| 19 | Win | 19–0 | Angel Manfredy | TKO | 2 (12), 2:47 | Dec 19, 1998 | 21 years, 298 days | Miccosukee Resort and Gaming, Miami, Florida, U.S. | Retained WBC super featherweight title |
| 18 | Win | 18–0 | Genaro Hernández | RTD | 8 (12), 3:00 | Oct 3, 1998 | 21 years, 221 days | Las Vegas Hilton, Winchester, Nevada, U.S. | Won WBC super featherweight title |
| 17 | Win | 17–0 | Tony Pep | UD | 10 | Jun 14, 1998 | 21 years, 110 days | Etess Arena, Atlantic City, New Jersey, U.S. | |
| 16 | Win | 16–0 | Gustavo Cuello | UD | 10 | Apr 18, 1998 | 21 years, 53 days | Grand Olympic Auditorium, Los Angeles, California, U.S. | |
| 15 | Win | 15–0 | Miguel Melo | TKO | 3 (10), 2:30 | Mar 23, 1998 | 21 years, 27 days | Foxwoods Resort Casino, Ledyard, Connecticut, U.S. | |
| 14 | Win | 14–0 | Sam Girard | KO | 2 (10), 2:47 | Feb 28, 1998 | 21 years, 4 days | Bally's, Atlantic City, New Jersey, U.S. | |
| 13 | Win | 13–0 | Hector Arroyo | TKO | 5 (10), 1:21 | Jan 9, 1998 | 20 years, 319 days | Grand Casino, Biloxi, Mississippi, U.S. | |
| 12 | Win | 12–0 | Angelo Nuñez | TKO | 3 (8), 2:42 | Nov 20, 1997 | 20 years, 269 days | Grand Olympic Auditorium, Los Angeles, California, U.S. | |
| 11 | Win | 11–0 | Felipe Garcia | KO | 6 (8), 2:56 | Oct 14, 1997 | 20 years, 232 days | Qwest Arena, Boise, Idaho, U.S. | |
| 10 | Win | 10–0 | Louie Leija | TKO | 2 (10), 2:33 | Sep 6, 1997 | 20 years, 194 days | County Coliseum, El Paso, Texas, U.S. | |
| 9 | Win | 9–0 | Jesus Roberto Chavez | TKO | 5 (6), 2:02 | Jul 12, 1997 | 20 years, 138 days | Grand Casino, Biloxi, Mississippi, U.S. | |
| 8 | Win | 8–0 | Larry O'Shields | UD | 6 | Jun 14, 1997 | 20 years, 110 days | Alamodome, San Antonio, Texas, U.S. | |
| 7 | Win | 7–0 | Tony Duran | TKO | 1 (6), 1:12 | May 9, 1997 | 20 years, 74 days | The Orleans, Paradise, Nevada, U.S. | |
| 6 | Win | 6–0 | Bobby Giepert | TKO | 1 (6), 1:30 | Apr 12, 1997 | 20 years, 47 days | Thomas & Mack Center, Paradise, Nevada, U.S. | |
| 5 | Win | 5–0 | Kino Rodriguez | TKO | 1 (6), 1:44 | Mar 12, 1997 | 20 years, 16 days | DeltaPlex Arena, Walker, Michigan, U.S. | |
| 4 | Win | 4–0 | Edgar Ayala | TKO | 2 (4), 1:39 | Feb 1, 1997 | 19 years, 343 days | Swiss Park Hall, Chula Vista, California, U.S. | |
| 3 | Win | 3–0 | Jerry Cooper | TKO | 1 (4), 1:39 | Jan 18, 1997 | 19 years, 329 days | Thomas & Mack Center, Paradise, Nevada, U.S. | |
| 2 | Win | 2–0 | Reggie Sanders | UD | 4 | Nov 30, 1996 | 19 years, 280 days | Tingley Coliseum, Albuquerque, New Mexico, U.S. | |
| 1 | Win | 1–0 | Roberto Apodaca | TKO | 2 (4), 0:37 | Oct 11, 1996 | 19 years, 230 days | Texas Station, North Las Vegas, Nevada, U.S. | |

== Exhibition boxing record ==
| 8 fights | 3 wins | 0 losses |
|---|---|---|
| By knockout | 3 | 0 |
| No contests | 1 | |
| Non-scored | 4 | |

| No. | Result | Record | Opponent | Type | Round, time | Date | Age | Location | Notes |
|---|---|---|---|---|---|---|---|---|---|
| 8 | —N/a | 3–0 (1–4) | John Gotti III | —N/a | 8 | Aug 24, 2024 | 47 years, 182 days | Mexico City Arena, Mexico City, Mexico | Non-scored bout |
| 7 | NC | 3–0 (1–3) | John Gotti III | DQ | 6 (8), 0:58 | Jun 11, 2023 | 46 years, 107 days | FLA Live Arena, Sunrise, Florida, U.S. | Fight stopped after excessive trash talking |
| 6 | —N/a | 3–0 (3) | Aaron Chalmers | —N/a | 8 | Feb 25, 2023 | 46 years, 1 day | O2 Arena, London, England | Non-scored bout |
| 5 | Win | 3–0 (2) | Deji Olatunji | TKO | 6 (8), 1:22 | Nov 13, 2022 | 45 years, 262 days | Coca-Cola Arena, Dubai, U.A.E. | |
| 4 | Win | 2–0 (2) | Mikuru Asakura | TKO | 2 (3), 2:59 | Sep 25, 2022 | 45 years, 213 days | Saitama Super Arena, Saitama, Japan | |
| 3 | —N/a | 1–0 (2) | Don Moore | —N/a | 8 | May 21, 2022 | 45 years, 86 days | Etihad Arena, Yas Island, Abu Dhabi, U.A.E. | Non-scored bout |
| 2 | —N/a | 1–0 (1) | Logan Paul | —N/a | 8 | Jun 6, 2021 | 44 years, 102 days | Hard Rock Stadium, Miami, Florida, U.S. | Non-scored bout |
| 1 | Win | 1–0 | Tenshin Nasukawa | TKO | 1 (3), 2:20 | Dec 31, 2018 | 41 years, 310 days | Saitama Super Arena, Saitama, Japan | |

== Titles in boxing ==
=== Major world titles ===
- WBC super featherweight champion (130 lbs)
- WBC lightweight champion (135 lbs)
- WBC super lightweight champion (140 lbs)
- WBA (Unified) welterweight champion (147 lbs)
- WBC welterweight champion (147 lbs) (2×)
- IBF welterweight champion (147 lbs)
- WBO welterweight champion (147 lbs)
- WBA (Super) light middleweight champion (154 lbs)
- WBC light middleweight champion (154 lbs) (2×)

=== The Ring magazine titles ===
- The Ring lightweight champion (135 lbs)
- The Ring welterweight champion (147 lbs) (2×)
- The Ring light middleweight champion (154 lbs)

=== Minor world titles ===
- IBO welterweight champion (147 lbs)
- IBA welterweight champion (147 lbs)

=== Honorary titles ===
- WBA Man of Triumph Gold champion
- WBC Emeritus Champion
- WBC Diamond light middleweight champion
- WBC 24K Gold champion
- WBC Supreme champion
- WBC Emerald champion
- WBC Money champion
- WBC Freedom 2023 champion

=== Amateur titles ===
- 1993 Michigan State Golden Gloves Champion (106 lbs)
- 1993 National Golden Gloves Champion (106 lbs)
- 1994 Michigan State Golden Gloves Champion (112 lbs)
- 1994 National Golden Gloves Champion (112 lbs) – Outstanding Boxer Award
- 1995 National PAL Champion (125 lbs) – Outstanding Boxer Award
- 1995 United States national amateur boxing featherweight champions (125 lbs)
- 1996 Michigan State Golden Gloves Champion (125 lbs)
- 1996 National Golden Gloves Champion (125 lbs)
- 1996 Atlanta Olympics Featherweight Bronze medalist

== Pay-per-view bouts ==
=== Boxing ===
United States
| No. | Date | Fight | Billing | Buys | Network | Revenue |
|---|---|---|---|---|---|---|
| 1 | June 25, 2005 | Gatti vs. Mayweather | Thunder & Lightning | 340,000 | HBO | $16,500,000 |
| 2 | April 8, 2006 | Mayweather vs. Judah | Sworn Enemies | 374,000 | HBO | $16,800,000 |
| 3 | November 4, 2006 | Mayweather vs. Baldomir | Pretty Risky | 325,000 | HBO | $16,300,000 |
| 4 | May 5, 2007 | De La Hoya vs. Mayweather | The World Awaits | 2,400,000 | HBO | $136,000,000 |
| 5 | December 8, 2007 | Mayweather vs. Hatton | Undefeated | 920,000 | HBO | $50,000,000 |
| 6 | September 19, 2009 | Mayweather vs. Márquez | Number One/Número Uno | 1,100,000 | HBO | $55,600,000 |
| 7 | May 1, 2010 | Mayweather vs. Mosley | Who R U Picking? | 1,400,000 | HBO | $78,300,000 |
| 8 | September 17, 2011 | Mayweather vs. Ortiz | Star Power | 1,250,000 | HBO | $78,440,000 |
| 9 | May 5, 2012 | Mayweather vs. Cotto | Ring Kings | 1,500,000 | HBO | $94,000,000 |
| 10 | May 4, 2013 | Mayweather vs. Guerrero | May Day | 1,000,000 | Showtime | $60,000,000 |
| 11 | September 14, 2013 | Mayweather vs. Canelo | The One | 2,200,000 | Showtime | $150,000,000 |
| 12 | May 3, 2014 | Mayweather vs. Maidana | The Moment | 900,000 | Showtime | $58,000,000 |
| 13 | September 13, 2014 | Mayweather vs. Maidana II | Mayhem | 925,000 | Showtime | $60,000,000 |
| 14 | May 2, 2015 | Mayweather vs. Pacquiao | Fight of the Century | 4,600,000 | Showtime/HBO | $400,000,000 |
| 15 | September 12, 2015 | Mayweather vs. Berto | High Stakes | 400,000 | Showtime | $28,000,000 |
| 16 | August 26, 2017 | Mayweather vs. McGregor | The Money Fight | 4,300,000 | Showtime | $370,000,000 |
| 17 | June 6, 2021 | Mayweather vs. Paul | Bragging Rights | 1,000,000 | Showtime | $50,000,000 |
| 18 | May 21, 2022 | Mayweather vs. Moore | The Showcase in the Skies of Dubai | —N/a | FITE TV | —N/a |
| 19 | Nov 13, 2022 | Mayweather vs. Deji | Mayweather–Deji | —N/a | DAZN | —N/a |
| 20 | Feb 25, 2023 | Mayweather vs. Chalmers | Royal Pain | —N/a | ZEUS | —N/a |
| 21 | Jun 11, 2023 | Mayweather vs. Gotti III | Mayweather–Gotti | —N/a | ZEUS | —N/a |
| Total | | | | 24,959,000 | | $1,717,940,000 |

United Kingdom
| Date | Fight | Network | Buys | Source(s) |
|---|---|---|---|---|
| December 8, 2007 | Floyd Mayweather Jr. vs. Ricky Hatton | Sky Box Office | 1,150,000 | |
| May 2, 2015 | Floyd Mayweather Jr. vs. Manny Pacquiao | Sky Box Office | 942,000 | |
| August 26, 2017 | Floyd Mayweather Jr. vs. Conor McGregor | Sky Box Office | 1,007,000 | |
| Total sales | | | 3,099,000 | |

=== WWE ===
| Date | Event | Venue | Location | Fight | Buys |
|---|---|---|---|---|---|
| March 30, 2008 | WrestleMania XXIV | Florida Citrus Bowl | Orlando, Florida | Floyd Mayweather Jr. vs. Big Show | 1,058,000 |

== Filmography ==
Films
| Year | Title | Role | Notes |
|---|---|---|---|
| 2003 | More than Famous | Himself | |
| 2007 | The World Awaits: De La Hoya vs. Mayweather | Himself | Documentary |
| 2014 | Think Like a Man Too | Himself | Cameo appearance |
| 2017 | When Love Kills: The Falicia Blakely Story | Punch | |
| 2018 | 6IX RISING | Himself | Cameo appearance |
| TBA | All-Star Weekend † | TBA | Completed |

Television series
| Year | Series | Role | Notes |
|---|---|---|---|
| In Production | The GOAT | Co-Executive Producer | Hidden Empire Films & The Money Team (TMT |
| 2005 | Countdown to Gatti-Mayweather | Himself | Documentary |
| 2006 | Soul of a Champion | Himself | Documentary |
| 2006 | Countdown to Baldomir-Mayweather | Himself | Documentary |
| 2007 | 24/7: De La Hoya/Mayweather | Himself | |
| 2007 | 24/7: Mayweather/Hatton | Himself | |
| 2009 | Countdown to Mayweather–Marquez | Himself | Documentary |
| 2009 | 24/7: Mayweather/Marquez | Himself | |
| 2010 | 24/7: Mayweather/Mosley | Himself | |
| 2011 | 24/7: Mayweather/Ortiz | Himself | |
| 2012 | 24/7: Mayweather/Cotto | Himself | |
| 2012 | Ridiculousness | Himself | Season 2, Episode 2 |
| 2013 | 30 Days In May | Himself | Documentary |
| 2013 | Mayweather | Himself | Documentary |
| 2013 | All Access: Mayweather vs. Guerrero | Himself | |
| 2013 | All Access: Mayweather vs. Canelo | Himself | |
| 2014 | All Access: Mayweather vs. Maidana | Himself | |
| 2014 | All Access: Mayweather vs. Maidana II | Himself | |
| 2015 | Inside Mayweather vs. Pacquiao | Himself | Documentary |
| 2015 | At Last: Mayweather vs. Pacquiao | Himself | Documentary |
| 2015 | All Access: Mayweather vs. Berto | Himself | |
| 2017 | All Access: Mayweather vs. McGregor | Himself | |
| 2017 | 6IX RISING | Himself | Documentary (Focus on Friyie's entrance song for Mayweather) |

Video games
| Year | Title | Role | Notes |
|---|---|---|---|
| 1999 | Knockout Kings 2000 | Himself | Playable fighter |
| 2000 | Knockout Kings 2001 | Himself | Playable fighter |
| 2002 | Knockout Kings 2002 | Himself | Playable fighter |
| 2002 | Knockout Kings 2003 | Himself | Playable fighter |
| 2005 | Fight Night Round 2 | Himself | Playable fighter |

Music videos
| Year | Artist | Title | Role | Notes |
|---|---|---|---|---|
| 2008 | Ludacris | "Undisputed" | Himself | Cameo appearance |
| 2016 | Justin Bieber | "Company" | Himself | Cameo appearance |
| 2023 | Armani White | "Goated" (featuring Denzel Curry) | Himself | Cameo appearance |

== Honors and awards ==
- 1998 and 2007 International Boxing Award Fighter of the Year
- 1998 and 2007 The Ring Magazine Fighter of the Year
- 2002 World Boxing Hall of Fame Fighter of the Year
- 2005 and 2007 World Boxing Council Boxer of the Year
- 2005–08 The Ring "number one" pound for pound
- 2007 Boxing Writers Association of America Fighter of the Year
- 2007 ESPN Fighter of the Year
- 2007 Forbes Magazine, Ranked "Number 14" Richest Celebrity Paydays
- 2007 New York Daily News Fighter of the Year
- 2007 World Boxing Council Event of the Year (The World Awaits)
- 2007 World Boxing Council Knockout of the Year (against Ricky Hatton)
- 2007, 2008, 2010, 2012 and 2013 Best Fighter ESPY Award
- 2007, 2008 and 2010 The Ring Magazine Event of the Year
- 2008 Sports Illustrated, The 50 Highest-Earning American Athletes (ranked 4th)
- 2008 Yahoo Sports, Ranked "Number 6" Most Powerful People in Boxing
- 2009 The Ring Magazine Comeback of the Year
- 2009–10 BoxRec, BBC Sport and Yahoo! Sports "number one" pound for pound
- 2010 Yahoo! Sports Boxing's Most Influential (ranked 70th)
- 2010 Forbes magazine Celebrity 100 (ranked 31st)
- 2010 Forbes Magazine, The World's 50 Top-Earning Athletes (ranked 2nd)
- 2010 Sports Illustrated, The 50 Highest-Earning American Athletes (ranked 3rd)
- 2012 Forbes Magazine #1 of the world's 100 highest paid athletes.
- 2012 Sports Illustrated #1 fortunes 50.
- 2013 The Ring "number one" pound for pound.
- 2013 Boxing Writers Association of America Fighter of the Year
- 2015 Spike TV The Best Ever Award
- 2015 Forbes, Ranked "Number One" as The World's Highest-Paid Celebrities.
- 2015 Boxing Writers Association of America Fighter of the Year
- 2016 Guinness World Records Highest career pay-per-view sales for a boxer ($1.3 billion)
- 2016 Guinness World Records Most expensive boxing championship belt ($1 Million)
- 2010–2019 Boxing Writers Association of America Fighter of the Decade
- 2010–2019 World Boxing Association Boxer of the Decade
- 2010–2019 Yahoo Sports Boxer of the Decade
- 2025 Champion of Israel (non-boxing award)

== See also ==
- List of super featherweight boxing champions
- List of lightweight boxing champions
- List of light welterweight boxing champions
- List of welterweight boxing champions
- List of light middleweight boxing champions
- List of WBA world champions
- List of WBC world champions
- List of IBF world champions
- List of WBO world champions
- List of IBO world champions
- List of The Ring world champions
- List of boxing quintuple champions

Sporting positions
Amateur boxing titles
| Previous: James Harris | U.S. Golden Gloves light flyweight champion 1993 | Next: Eric Morel |
| Previous: Carlos Navarro | U.S. Golden Gloves flyweight champion 1994 | Next: Kelly Wright |
| Previous: Frank Carmona | U.S. featherweight champion 1995 | Next: Augie Sanchez |
| Previous: Frank Carmona | U.S. Golden Gloves featherweight champion 1995 | Next: José Hernández |
Minor world boxing titles
| Vacant Title last held by Jawaid Khaliq | IBO welterweight champion April 8, 2006 – May 2007; Vacated | Vacant Title next held by Isaac Hlatshwayo |
| Preceded by Carlos Baldomir | IBA welterweight champion November 4, 2006 – May 2007; Vacated | Vacant Title next held by Freddy Hernández |
Major world boxing titles
| Preceded by Genaro Hernández | WBC super featherweight champion October 3, 1998 – May 14, 2002; Vacated | Vacant Title next held by Sirimongkol Singwancha |
| Preceded by José Luis Castillo | WBC lightweight champion April 20, 2002 – May 30, 2004; Vacated | Vacant Title next held by José Luis Castillo |
| Vacant Title last held by Pernell Whitaker | The Ring lightweight champion April 20, 2002 – May 30, 2004; Vacated | Vacant Title next held by José Luis Castillo |
| Preceded by Arturo Gatti | WBC super lightweight champion June 25, 2005 – March 23, 2006; Vacated | Vacant Title next held by Junior Witter |
| Preceded by Zab Judah | IBF welterweight champion April 8, 2006 – June 20, 2006; Vacated | Vacant Title next held by Kermit Cintrón |
| Preceded by Carlos Baldomir | WBC welterweight champion November 4, 2006 – June 7, 2008; Retired | Vacant Title next held by Andre Berto |
| Preceded by Carlos Baldomir | The Ring welterweight champion November 4, 2006 – June 7, 2008; Retired | Vacant Title next held by Himself |
| Preceded by Oscar De La Hoya | WBC light middleweight champion May 5, 2007 – July 2, 2007; Vacated | Vacant Title next held by Vernon Forrest |
| Preceded by Victor Ortiz | WBC welterweight champion September 17, 2011 – November 4, 2015; Retired | Vacant Title next held by Danny García |
| Preceded by Miguel Cotto | WBA light middleweight champion Super title May 5, 2012 – January 31, 2016; Retired | Vacant Title next held by Erislandy Lara |
| Vacant Title last held by Himself | The Ring welterweight champion May 4, 2013 – September 12, 2015; Retired | Vacant |
| Preceded by Canelo Álvarez | WBC light middleweight champion September 14, 2013 – November 4, 2015; Retired | Vacant Title next held by Jermell Charlo |
| Preceded by Canelo Álvarez | The Ring light middleweight champion September 14, 2013 – August 10, 2015; Stripped | Vacant Title next held by Jermell Charlo |
| New title Unified against Marcos Maidana | WBA welterweight champion Unified title May 3, 2014 – January 2016; Retired | Vacant |
| Preceded by Manny Pacquiao | WBO welterweight champion May 2, 2015 – July 6, 2015; Stripped | Succeeded by Timothy Bradley promoted from interim status |
Awards
| Inaugural recipient | Best Fighter ESPY Award; 2007, 2008 | Next: Manny Pacquiao |
| Previous: Vitali Klitschko | The Ring Comeback of the Year; 2009 | Next: Bernard Hopkins |
| Previous: Manny Pacquiao | Best Fighter ESPY Award; 2010 | Next: Manny Pacquiao |
| Previous: Manny Pacquiao | Best Fighter ESPY Award; 2012–2014 | Next: Ronda Rousey |
| Previous: Evander Holyfield | The Ring Fighter of the Year; 1998 | Next: Paulie Ayala |
| Previous: Manny Pacquiao | The Ring Fighter of the Year; 2007 | Next: Manny Pacquiao |
| Previous: Manny Pacquiao | BWAA Fighter of the Year; 2007 | Next: Manny Pacquiao |
| Previous: Nonito Donaire | BWAA Fighter of the Year; 2013 | Next: Terence Crawford |
| Previous: Terence Crawford | BWAA Fighter of the Year; 2015 | Next: Carl Frampton |
| Previous: Manny Pacquiao | BWAA Fighter of the Decade; 2010s | Incumbent |
Achievements
| Preceded by Bernard Hopkins | The Ring pound for pound #1 boxer July 18, 2005 – June 9, 2008; Retired | Succeeded by Manny Pacquiao |
| Vacant Title last held by Manny Pacquiao | The Ring pound for pound #1 boxer December 11, 2012 – September 16, 2015; Retired | Succeeded by Román González |
