= Floyd Mayweather Jr. vs. DeMarcus Corley =

Boxing match

- Date: May 22, 2004
- Venue: Boardwalk Hall, Atlantic City, New Jersey, U.S.
- Title(s) on the line: WBC Super Lightweight title eliminator

Tale of the tape
Boxer	Floyd Mayweather Jr.	DeMarcus Corley
Nickname	Pretty Boy	Chop Chop
Hometown	Grand Rapids, Michigan, U.S.	Washington, D.C., U.S.
Pre-fight record	31–0 (21 KO)	28–2–1 (16 KO)
Age	27 years, 2 months	29 years, 11 months
Height	5 ft 8 in (173 cm)	5 ft 7 in (170 cm)
Weight	140 lb (64 kg)	140 lb (64 kg)
Style	Orthodox	Southpaw
Recognition	WBC and The Ring; Lightweight Champion; The Ring; No. 2 ranked pound-for-pound fighter 2-division world champion	IBF/The Ring; No. 6 Ranked Light Welterweight; WBA; No. 10 Ranked Light Welterweight; WBC; No. 15 Ranked Super Lightweight; Former WBO junior welterweight champion

Result
- Mayweather wins via unanimous decision (119–108, 119–107, 118–108)

Floyd Mayweather Jr. vs. DeMarcus Corley was a professional boxing match contested on May 22, 2004.

== Background ==
After successfully defending his WBC and The Ring for the third time in his previous fight against Phillip N'dou on November 1, 2003, Floyd Mayweather Jr. confirmed that the fight would be his last in the lightweight division as he would be moving up the 140-pound super lightweight division. Mayweather expressed interest in facing the soon-to-be-WBC super lightweight champion Arturo Gatti, and negotiations began in February 2004 to designate a fight between Mayweather and former IBF lightweight champion Paul Spadafora, who was also moving up in weight, as a WBC super lightweight title eliminator with the winner becoming the mandatory challenger to Gatti. Promoter Bob Arum was looking to bring the Mayweather–Spadafora fight to Madison Square Garden on May 8, but the New York State Athletic Commission refused to license the fight as Spadafora was awaiting trial for the 2003 shooting of his girlfriend, causing the fight to fall through. Instead, it was announced in March that Mayweather would be matched up against replacement opponent, former WBO junior welterweight champion DeMarcus Corley. Corley had not fought since losing his title to Zab Judah 10 months prior, but denied that the length layoff would effect him as he had partaken in the training camps of Ricardo Mayorga and Kostya Tszyu as a sparring partner since his last fight.

== The Fight ==
Mayweather dominated Corley en route to a unanimous decision victory, with all three judges scoring the fight lopsidedly in Mayweather's favor; 119–108, 119–107 and 118–108. Corley was aggressive and attempted to press the action during the early portion of the fight and managed to stagger Mayweather in the third and fourth rounds, but over the course of the fight, Mayweather used his superior defense to keep Corley off balance and effectively counter-punched. Corley was down on the canvas seven times during the bout, though only two were official knockdowns while the remainder were ruled slips or pushes. The first knockdown came in the eighth round after a Mayweather combination forced a tired Corley to take a knee. In the tenth, Mayweather again sent Corley down on his knee after landing a five-punch combination. The final CompuBox punch stats showed Mayweather landing 283 of 600 thrown punches for a 47% success rate while Corley landed 150 of 657 thrown punches for a 23% success rate.

== Fight card ==
Confirmed bouts:

Weight Class	Weight		vs.		Method	Round	Notes
Super Lightweight	140 lbs.	Floyd Mayweather Jr.	def.	DeMarcus Corley	UD	12/12	^{note 1}
Middleweight	160 lbs.	Anthony Thompson	def.	Jason Naugler	UD	8/8
Welterweight	147 lbs.	Dmitriy Salita	def.	Rocky Martinez	UD	8/8
Welterweight	147 lbs.	Arthur Medina	def.	Scott DePompe	TKO	4/6
Super Middleweight	168 lbs.	Dennis Sharpe	def.	Earl Allen	TKO	4/6
Cruiserweight	190 lbs.	Victor Paz	def.	Karim Shabbazz	UD	4/4
Lightweight	135 lbs.	Carney Bowman	def.	David Maund	UD	4/4

^Note 1 WBC Super Lightweight Title Eliminator

== Broadcasting ==
Country	Broadcaster
United States	HBO

Preceded by vs. Phillip N'dou	Floyd Mayweather Jr.'s bouts 22 May 2004	Succeeded by vs. Henry Bruseles
Preceded by vs. Zab Judah	DeMarcus Corley's bouts 22 May 2004	Succeeded by vs. Darryl Tyson
