= Floyd Mayweather Jr. vs. José Luis Castillo II =

Boxing match

Mayweather–Castillo II
- Date: December 7, 2002
- Venue: Mandalay Bay Events Center, Paradise, Nevada, U.S.
- Title(s) on the line: WBC and The Ring lightweight titles

Tale of the tape
Boxer	Floyd Mayweather Jr.	José Luis Castillo
Nickname	Pretty Boy	El Terrible ("The Fearsome")
Hometown	Grand Rapids, Michigan, U.S.	Empalme, Sonora, Mexico
Purse	$2,400,000	$150,000
Pre-fight record	28–0 (20 KO)	46–5–1 (42 KO)
Age	25 years, 9 months	28 years, 11 months
Height	5 ft 8 in (173 cm)	5 ft 7 1/2 in (171 cm)
Weight	134 lb (61 kg)	135 lb (61 kg)
Style	Orthodox	Orthodox
Recognition	WBC and The Ring; Lightweight Champion	WBC; No. 1 Ranked Lightweight

Result
- Mayweather wins via unanimous decision (116–113, 115–113, 115–113)

Floyd Mayweather Jr. vs. José Luis Castillo II was a professional boxing match contested on December 7, 2002 for the WBC and The Ring lightweight titles.

== Background ==
Mayweather and Castillo had fought eight months earlier with Mayweather prevailing with a unanimous decision. The decision was seen as controversial as Castillo had clearly outpunched Mayweather 203 to 157 and landed over 100 more power punches than Mayweather. The fight's promoter Bob Arum, while not necessarily saying Mayweather didn't win, called the scoring for the fight, with Mayweather having won comfortably by five points on one scorecard and four points on the other two, "ludicrous" and vowed that he would attempt to schedule a rematch on August 10 at the Staples Center in Los Angeles with the bout being carried on HBO pay-per-view rather than on cable. However, Arum's plans were scuttled when Mayweather refused to fight in Los Angeles, claiming he could not trust the judges and did not want to fight in front of what expected to be a largely Mexican crowd that would be in favor of Castillo. As a result of Mayweather's refusal to fight in Los Angeles, the fight was rescheduled to take place in Nevada's Mandalay Bay Events Center on October 5 with the fight happening on a standard telecast of HBO World Championship Boxing rather than on HBO pay-per-view. In preparation for the rematch with Mayweather, Castillo took a tune-up fight with Verdell Smith, defeating him by third-round knockout in his native Mexico in early August.

While training for the fight in late September, Castillo developed a case of Achilles tendinitis, resulting in the fight being postponed until December 7. Though Castillo was expected to be healed by October 19, Arum opted to move the fight to December so as to avoid competition from the 2002 World Series.

Originally, the Mayweather–Castillo rematch was to be the main event of a boxing card that featured WBO heavyweight champion Wladimir Klitschko defending his title against Jameel McCline as the featured undercard bout. However, when Mayweather no-showed a press conference promoting the card three days before the event, Arum, having tired of Mayweather's antics, decided to flip the two fights with the Klitschko–McCline bout taking the main event slot, while the Mayweather–Castillo fight was moved to the undercard.

== The fights ==
=== Mayweather vs. Castillo II ===
As in the first fight, Castillo pressed the action and served as the aggressor, but Mayweather, taking a more defensive approach, proved elusive as he frequently landed his jab and right leads to keep Castillo off balance and quickly moved away from, mostly avoiding any exchanges with him. While Castillo once again threw more punches, Mayweather's superior defensive skills held Castillo to only landing 137 of his 603 thrown punches for a paltry 23% success rate, while Mayweather connected with 162 of his 399 thrown punches and dominated with his jab, out landing Castillo 88 to 36. Unlike the previous fight, Mayweather finished strong as he only lost one round on one scorecard during the last five rounds. The three scorecards were closer than in the previous fight, with Mayweather winning by two scores of 115–113 and one score of 116–113 to take the fight by unanimous decision.

HBO unofficial scorer Harold Lederman scored the fight 115–113 in Mayweather's favor, as did his HBO colleague Larry Merchant. The Associated Press had Mayweather the winner 116–112.

=== Klitschko vs. McCline ===
The new main event saw WBO heavyweight titleholder Wladimir Klitschko face No. 1 ranked contenter Jameel McCline.

=== The fight ===
The fight turned out to be tentative, with Klitschko winning almost every round using his jab and superior footwork. At the end of the tenth round, Klitschko staggered McCline with a barrage of left hooks and overhand rights, and ultimately knocked him down with a left-right combination. Before the start of the eleventh round, McCline's corner threw in the towel, giving Klitschko his 36th career win by stoppage.

At the time of the stoppage, the scorecards were 98–91, 99–90 (twice), all in favour of the champion. CompuBox stats showed that Klitschko landed 181 of his 433 punches thrown (42%), and McCline landed 61 of 307 (20%).

Preceded by vs. Ray Mercer	Wladimir Klitschko's bouts 7 December 2002	Succeeded by vs. Corrie Sanders
Preceded by vs. Shannon Briggs	Jameel McCline's bouts 7 December 2002	Succeeded by vs. Charles Shufford

== Fight card ==
Confirmed bouts:

Weight Class	Weight		vs.		Method	Round	Notes
Heavyweight	200+ lbs.	Wladimir Klitschko	def.	Jameel McCline	RTD	10/12	^{note 1}
Lightweight	135 lbs.	Floyd Mayweather Jr.	def.	José Luis Castillo	UD	12/12	^{note 2}
Preliminary bouts
Heavyweight	200+ lbs.	Kirk Johnson	def.	Jeremy Bates	KO	2/8
Super Bantamweight	122 lbs.	Toshiaki Nishioka	def.	Evangelio Pérez	KO	1/6
Cruiserweight	200 lbs.	Alexander Petkovic	def.	John Battle	TKO	6/6
Welterweight	147 lbs.	Dmitry Salita	def.	Carlos Horacio Nevarez	UD	6/6
Super Welterweight	154 lbs.	Steven Küchler	def.	Jonathan Nelson	TKO	2/4
Heavyweight	200+ lbs.	Alexander Dimitrenko	def.	Jeff Ford	UD	4/4

^Note 1 For WBO Heavyweight title
^Note 2 For WBC and The Ring lightweight titles

== Broadcasting ==
Country	Broadcaster
United Kingdom	Sky Sports
United States	HBO

Preceded by First bout	Floyd Mayweather Jr.'s bouts 7 December 2002	Succeeded by vs. Victoriano Sosa
Preceded by vs. Verdell Smith	José Luis Castillo's bouts 7 December 2002	Succeeded by vs. Gustavo Corral
