= Floyd Mayweather Jr. vs. Victoriano Sosa =

Boxing match

- Date: April 19, 2003
- Venue: Selland Arena, Fresno, California, U.S.
- Title(s) on the line: WBC and The Ring lightweight titles

Tale of the tape
Boxer	Floyd Mayweather Jr.	Victoriano Sosa
Nickname	Pretty Boy	El Santico ("The Saint")
Hometown	Grand Rapids, Michigan, U.S.	Santiago de los Caballeros, Dominican Republic
Pre-fight record	29–0 (20 KO)	35–2–2 (26 KO)
Age	26 years, 1 month	29 years
Height	5 ft 8 in (173 cm)	5 ft 9 in (175 cm)
Weight	134 lb (61 kg)	134 lb (61 kg)
Style	Orthodox	Orthodox
Recognition	WBC and The Ring; Lightweight Champion; The Ring No. 7 ranked pound-for-pound fighter 2-division world champion	WBC; No. 5 Ranked Lightweight

Result
- Mayweather wins via unanimous decision (119–109, 118–110, 118–110)

Floyd Mayweather Jr. vs. Victoriano Sosa was a professional boxing match contested on April 19, 2003 for the WBC and The Ring lightweight titles.

== Background ==
Having moved up to lightweight and then defeated José Luis Castillo twice in 2002 to capture his second world title, Floyd Mayweather Jr.'s first defense of 2003 was announced to be against little-known Victoriano Sosa. Sosa was ranked as the number-five lightweight contender by the WBC, but had seldom fought outside his native Dominican Republic and lost his only other title fight to IBF champion Paul Spadafora. Before settling on Sosa, Mayweather's promoter Bob Arum had attempted to pit Mayweather against Spadafora in a unification bout tentatively set to take place in New York City's Madison Square Garden, but Spadafora turned down a reported $1,000,000 offer to pursue another unification bout with Leonard Doroftei. The fight was held in the non-traditional boxing market of Fresno, California after Arum was unable to get Madison Square Garden or any of the Las Vegas Valley area casinos to accept the fight. This would be boxing's first world title fight to take place in the city of Fresno.

== The Fight ==
Mayweather cruised to an easy victory, winning lopsidedly by unanimous decision. One judge had Mayweather winning by a score of 119–109 (11 rounds to one) while the other two scored the fight 118–110 (10 rounds to two) also in Mayweather's favor. Fighting his usual defensive style, Mayweather held Sosa, who threw over 100 more punches than Mayweather, to a measly 14% success rate as Sosa landed just 79 of 565 thrown punches. Mayweather used his jab to his advantage as he frequently landed the punch to both Sosa's body and head, hitting Sosa 147 times for a 60% success rate while Sosa only mustered 12 landed jabs of his own.

HBO unofficial scorer Harold Lederman scored the fight 116–112 (eight rounds to four).

== Fight card ==
Confirmed bouts:

Weight Class	Weight		vs.		Method	Round	Notes
Lightweight	135 lbs.	Floyd Mayweather Jr. (c)	def.	Victoriano Sosa	UD	12/12	^{note 1}
Super Lightweight	140 lbs.	Miguel Cotto	def.	Joel Perez	KO	4/10
Lightweight	135 lbs.	Jenifer Alcorn	def.	Mia St. John	UD	8/8x2
Middleweight	160 lbs.	Rodney Jones	def.	Gilbert Jackson	TKO	3/8
Cruiserweight	200 lbs.	Eduardo Escobedo	def.	Nestor Hugo Paniagua	KO	6/6
Welterweight	147 lbs.	Frank Mondejar	def.	Billy Parvin	KO	1/4

^Note 1 For WBC and The Ring lightweight titles

== Broadcasting ==
Country	Broadcaster
United Kingdom	Sky Sports
United States	HBO

Preceded by vs. José Luis Castillo II	Floyd Mayweather Jr.'s bouts 19 April 2003	Succeeded by vs. Phillip N'dou
Preceded by vs. Luis Sosa	Victoriano Sosa's bouts 19 April 2003	Succeeded by vs. Miguel Angel Huerta
