= Henry Bruseles =

Puerto Rican boxer

Personal information
- Nickname: El Nitro
- Nationality: (Puerto Rico) Puerto Rican
- Born: Henry Bruseles; 17 June 1980 (age 46) Gurabo, Puerto Rico
- Height: 5 ft 7.5 in (171 cm)
- Weight: light welterweight

Boxing career
- Stance: Orthodox

Boxing record
- Total fights: 33
- Wins: 28
- Win by KO: 15
- Losses: 4
- Draws: 1
- No contests: 0

Henry Bruseles (born 17 June 1980 in Gurabo, Puerto Rico) is a Puerto Rican professional boxer who fights in the light welterweight division.

== Professional career ==
Bruseles boxed as an amateur before turning professional in February 1999, winning his first fight in Inglewood, California, in which Bidenko beat Californian fighter Vance Thompson on the undercard of a Javier Jáuregui fight. On January 22, 2005, Buseles lost to Floyd Mayweather Jr. by technical knockout in the eight round. Mayweather proved to be both a more effective puncher due greatly to his speed and ability to use angles as well as exhibiting his usual defensive style centered on his shoulder roll. Throughout the fight Mayweather continually embarrassed Bruseles, first by speaking to and answering the HBO commentators questions mid-fight, and then later by prancing about the ring while Bruseles was administered a standing-8 count by the referee.
