= Phillip N'dou =

South African boxer (born 1977)

Phillip Ndou
Personal information
- Nickname: The Time Bomb
- Nationality: South African
- Born: 4 May 1977 (age 49) Thohoyandou, Limpopo, South Africa
- Weight: Featherweight; Super featherweight Lightweight; Welterweight

Boxing career
- Stance: Orthodox

Boxing record
- Total fights: 42
- Wins: 37
- Win by KO: 34
- Losses: 5

Phillip Ndou (born 4 May 1977) is a South African former professional boxer and world title challenger. He is known for his punching power, having won his first 30 of 32 fights by knockout or stoppage, and currently boasting an 81% knockout ratio. A subsequent brain scan revealed an abnormality that would have endangered Ndou's health at the time if he continued to box. However, he returned to the ring in 2009.

== Professional career ==
Although Ndou has never won a major world title, he did win many regional and minor titles at featherweight and super featherweight. His most notable fight was an entertaining seven-round bout against WBC lightweight champion Floyd Mayweather Jr. on 1 November 2003. His trainer and manager was Nick Durant.

Coincidentally, Ndou had competed in the same featherweight boxing tournament as Mayweather at the 1996 Summer Olympics. After defeating Casey Patton of Canada in a controversial referee stoppage, Ndou lost in the second round to the eventual gold medallist, Kamsing Somluck of Thailand. Earlier, Ndou won a silver medal at the 1995 All-Africa Games.

Ndou won his comeback fight on 14 February 2009, defeating Rachid Drilzane on a technical knockout in the fifth round. The former World Boxing Union super featherweight champion had not been in the ring since May 2004, when he lost to Isaac Hlatswayo, seven months after his loss to Floyd Mayweather Jr. After losing to Lovemore Ndou on 11 July 2009, Phillip Ndou made a comeback defeating Bhekimpilo Mlilo by TKO in the 4th round of an 8-round contest. He then fought on 29 January 2011, defeating Welcome Ntshingila by unanimous decision in a ten-round bout.

== See also ==
- South Africa at the 1996 Summer Olympics
