= Genaro Hernández vs. Floyd Mayweather Jr. =

Boxing match

- Date: October 3, 1998
- Venue: Las Vegas Hilton, Winchester, Nevada, U.S.
- Title(s) on the line: WBC super featherweight title

Tale of the tape
Boxer	Genaro Hernández	Floyd Mayweather Jr.
Nickname	Chicanito	Pretty Boy
Hometown	Los Angeles, California, U.S.	Grand Rapids, Michigan, U.S.
Purse	$600,000	$150,000
Pre-fight record	38–1–1 (17 KO)	17–0 (13 KO)
Age	32 years, 4 months	21 years, 7 months
Height	5 ft 11 in (180 cm)	5 ft 8 in (173 cm)
Weight	130 lb (59 kg)	130 lb (59 kg)
Style	Orthodox	Orthodox
Recognition	WBC; Super Featherweight Champion	1996 Olympics Bronze medallist

Result
- Mayweather wins via 8th-round corner retirement

Genaro Hernández vs. Floyd Mayweather Jr. was a professional boxing match contested on October 3, 1998 for the WBC super featherweight title. The fight took place at the Las Vegas Hilton in Winchester, Nevada and was Mayweather's first world title fight.

== Background ==
In July 1998, it was announced that reigning WBC super featherweight champion Genaro Hernández would meet undefeated up-and-comer Floyd Mayweather Jr. on October 3 that same year. The 21-year old Mayweather was less than two years into his professional career when the fight was made official but was a perfect 17–0 with 13 knockouts. Despite his relative inexperience and having not yet fought a fighter the calibre of Hernández, Mayweather and his father and trainer Floyd Mayweather Sr. insisted that promoter Bob Arum make the fight with Arum explaining that the younger Mayweather "wants to make his mark and establish himself as a star" by defeating Hernández. Hernández, a 32-year old veteran of 40 professional fights had lost only once at the time of his fight with Mayweather, being bested by Oscar De La Hoya three years earlier in a bout for the then lightly guarded WBO lightweight title. Hernández, who admitted that he had taken Mayweather as an opponent due to the lucrative $600,000 payday he received, suggested that his experience and intelligence would give him the edge over his much younger opponent explaining "I think that's an advantage for me. He may be too excited and that could lead to him making a few errors. It could drain him, little by little." However, Mayweather countered that he was "younger, faster and stronger. I'm the complete package." When the fight was first announced, the betting odds were even, though Mayweather was installed as a -160 favorite by the time of the fight.

== The fight ==
In what would become a precursor to his subsequent fights, Mayweather dominated Hernández through the course of eight rounds, taking nearly every round on all three of the judge's scorecards. Mayweather landed over half of his thrown punches, scoring 221 of 412 thrown punches for a 54% success rate, while Hernández struggled mightily to land sustained offense and only landed 103 of 314 punches. By the end of the eight round, with Hernández taking a lot of abuse from Mayweather and his right eye beginning to swell shut, Hernández's brother and trainer Rudy informed Genaro that he would not allow him to go back out for the ninth round. After referee Jay Nady confirmed this, the fight was stopped, giving Mayweather the victory by corner retirement.

== Fight card ==
Confirmed bouts:

Weight Class	Weight		vs.		Method	Round	Notes
Super Featherweight	130 lbs.	Floyd Mayweather Jr.	def.	Genaro Hernández (c)	RTD	8/12	^{note 1}
Cruiserweight	190 lbs.	Vassiliy Jirov	def.	John Kiser	TKO	8/10
Heavyweight	200+ lbs.	Lamon Brewster	def.	Marcus Rhode	TKO	1/8
Middleweight	160 lbs.	Lionel Ortíz	def.	Eric Holland	MD	6/6
Featherweight	126 lbs.	Augie Sanchez	def.	Ramon Acuna	KO	1/6
Featherweight	126 lbs.	Sandra Yard	vs.	Deborah Nichols	D	4/4x2

^Note 1 For WBC Super Featherweight Title

== Broadcasting ==
Country	Broadcaster
United States	HBO

Preceded by vs. Carlos Gerena	Genaro Hernández's bouts 3 October 1998	Retired
Preceded by vs. Tony Pep	Floyd Mayweather Jr.'s bouts 3 October 1998	Succeeded by vs. Angel Manfredy
