= Colonia, Oxnard, California =

Colonia
- Neighborhood of Oxnard
- Interactive map of Colonia
- Coordinates: 34°12′10″N 119°10′6″W
- Country: United States
- State: California
- County: Ventura
- City: Oxnard

The Colonia (/kəˈloʊniə/; or La Colonia) is a neighborhood (Spanish: barrio) located in the central portion of the city of Oxnard, California, USA. The neighborhood was laid out by the Colonia Land Improvement Company in close proximity of the sugar factory and beet fields to house workers just east of the city's downtown business district. Long a Latino barrio, it is home to lower-income families, former resident César Chávez once lived there, also known worldwide as Boxnard because of La Colonia Youth Boxing Club, which has produced notable fighters such as Fernando Vargas, Robert Garcia, Miguel Angel Garcia, Victor Ortíz, Brandon Rios and Mia St. John.

The north to south boundaries are Camino del Sol to 3rd Street and the west to east boundaries are Oxnard Boulevard (formerly state route 1) to Rose Avenue. The neighborhood contains one private and two public elementary schools. There is a small branch of the Oxnard Public Library.

== History ==
=== Early history ===
The area was part of the Chumash region, which extended from Point Conception to Santa Monica and back into the foothills as far as the Coast Range.

On May 22, 1837, the 44,883-acre (182 km^{2}) Rancho El Rio de Santa Clara o la Colonia was granted to former Santa Barbara Presidio soldiers Valentin Cota, Leandro Gonzales, Rafael Gonzales, Salvador Valenzuela, Vicente Pico, Rafael Valdez and Vincent Feliz. The rancho, which was commonly spoken of, or was in the rancho days, as the Colonia, extended from the Santa Clara River south to the present day Point Mugu Naval Air Station, or to the boundary of Rancho Guadalasca, and east from the Pacific Ocean to the present day 101 Freeway, or to the boundary of Rancho Santa Clara del Norte.

California became a U.S. state in 1850 and, in the 1860s, most of the Colonia's lands were sold off to businessmen from the East Coast who were primarily interested in prospecting for oil. In 1873, Ventura County was formed from the southeastern section of Santa Barbara County. Hueneme was founded in 1874 by Thomas R. Bard. The Colonia Oil Company sold a lot of land to the newly formed Colonia Land Improvement Company, in 1897, for a townsite around a factory being built, two miles northeast of Hueneme, to produce sugar from sugar beets. In 1898, Oxnard was founded around what was originally named the Colonia Beet-Sugar Factory and began to grow.

=== 1898 through 1960s ===
La Colonia is one of Oxnard's oldest neighborhoods. It was laid out by the Colonia Land Improvement Company just east of the city's downtown business district and in close proximity of the sugar factory and beet fields to house workers.

Early in the 20th century, white farmers began selling parcels of land to Latino families. The area, once known as Colonia Gardens, boasted half the agricultural city's farm labor force and grew to a population of 8,000 people by 1948. It had its own newspaper, La Voz del La Colonia, which sponsored fiestas and parades.

In 2019, author Margo Porras published "Growing Up in La Colonia: Boomer Memories from Oxnard's Barrio. The book focuses exclusively on Colonia and its rich history in Oxnard.

==== The betabeleros ====
Robert F. Kennedy in Cristo Rey Church

The suspicious death of two Mexican immigrants in 1900 in an Oxnard jail that mysteriously caught fire brought tensions to a high between the labor force and the authorities.

In this climate in 1903, Mexican immigrant workers joined with Japanese immigrant workers to form the Japanese Mexican Labor Association (JMLA) in response to the (Oxnard-based) American Beet Sugar Company slashing wages in half in what is called the Oxnard Strike of 1903. Subsequent strikes and marches were met with police brutality and escalated on March 23, 1903, when strike-breakers escorted by police were blocked in the streets by armed JMLA members. Five people were left wounded after shooting began between both sides; the event was subsequently blamed on the JMLA. After a few years of police brutality and several demonstrations, the JMLA won concessions from the American Beet Sugar Company growers of Oxnard and fell apart afterwards.

In 1933, the Latino beet picking labor force decided to join the Cannery and Agricultural Workers Industrial Union (CAWIU) to gain a 50% increase in wages (35 cents an hour), eliminate the use of labor contractors, and gain free transportation to work, weekly paydays, and eight-hour work days. When the American Beet Sugar Company rejected their demands, the local Latino community marched with the beet pickers ("betabeleros") in a strike. The ACLU and International Defense Council soon joined the effort. The $42 million annual industry, economically crippled, responded by utilizing local law enforcement against the strikers and the community. The Oxnard City Government fought back as well. By founding the Homeowners Organization, they hoped to entice workers into ending the strike by guaranteeing them status as true Oxnard citizens. In August 1933, the betabeleros led a multi-cultural parade from La Colonia through Oxnard to the police headquarters where leaders met privately with police leaders on their recent actions against striking workers. After this meeting failed to bring peace, leaders of the strike held a public discussion of the police force as a tool of the ranchers and politicians. Subsequently ten betabeleros leaders were held in county jail without charges. This sparked ACLU members who had taken an interest in the situation to file petitions with the Department of Labor for rapid intervention. The ten men's immediate trial and acquittal allowed for relative peace since the strike had thus far gained laborers an increase in wages (one of their many demands). To this day, the strike represents a bitter obstacle in the community's relationship with the police.

==== The zoot suit arrests ====
This conflict with the Oxnard Police Department and the "upper tier" of society continued in the 1940s as the zoot suit culture emerged. Officers frequently detained, stripped, shaved and confiscated offending clothing from young men and women. In 1942, a group of men and women listening to outdoor music were tear gassed and brutally arrested, leading to greater apprehension within the community to deal with the authorities.

=== Crime rising (1970s through 1990s) ===
During the 1970s and 1980s, owners began renting their properties. Crime began skyrocketing as drugs, and then resulting gangs, created a mentality in the community against the police, who had historically never patrolled within the neighborhood and only entered on occasional emergency calls. Policemen that did enter the barrio in this time period did so in pairs and in vehicles often pelted with rocks and bottles. The 1990s saw Oxnard Police making a great effort to lower the crime rate and better their relationship with the community. However, the 1997 aggressive shooting of Oliverio Martinez by police and their later obstruction of emergency room procedures to interrogate him led to issues in the community.

Nevertheless, after a 1993 police department storefront opened despite attempted arson, members of the community felt driven to return order to their neighborhood. Soon federal grants brought computer and job training programs, improvements to the parks, demolition of known locations of drug sales, and incentives to improve properties.

=== Rejuvenation period (2000 to present) ===
Starting roughly after 2000, La Colonia began a renovation project to improve its image in respect to the city. New construction on once empty lots or ramshackle homes began in much of the southern areas. The housing boom spurred development and re-investment. $59 million went into renovating 260 housing units at The Courts and Cesar Chavez School. The Our Lady of Guadalupe Parish built a new church in 2012. The re-establishment of Ramona School was another example of this renovation. The elementary school established in 1940 was a keystone into the educational advancement that many residents of Colonia. The school fell into disrepair and was left unused by the mid-1990s. In 2000 the school district cleared the original school site and re-built a new school. A rededication of the school along with many invited Alumni from years past occurred in August 2000.

== Gang injunction ==
In June 2004, the Oxnard Police Department and the Ventura County Sheriff imposed a gang injunction in over a 6.6-square-mile (17 km^{2}) area of the city in order to restrict gang activity. Some political activists lobbied against the injunction arguing that it amounted to racial discrimination, that it unconstitutionally banned assembly and expression through wearing Dallas Cowboys affiliated clothing, and that it was being used as a tool for the slow gentrification of La Colonia (this includes speculation that the gang injunction was instituted simply to allow for the economic viability of the downtown area). Anti-injunction proponents cited the Oxnard Police Department in their argument that since 1992, crime had dropped to half of what it once was and that of the 39 homicides charged against the Chiques since 1993 they had only actually committed four. Elements in the community fearing the injunction would increasingly marginalize the Hispanic youth of the city wrote letters into the local newspapers and tried to introduce an alternative plan to increase spending on gang prevention/pro-youth programs. The city council refused to contemplate such programs.

However, other residents, long upset over criminal gang activity in their neighborhoods, supported the gang injunction. The injunction proved to be an effective tool against Oxnard's biggest and most dangerous gangs as the number of murders in the area fell from 22 in 2003 to 18 in 2004. It survived a court challenge to be upheld in the Ventura County Superior Court; the law was made permanent in 2005 and was soon implemented on another section of the city. Continued efforts by members of a local branch of LULAC and the grass roots movement committee on Raza Rights included more editorial letters in local newspapers and public discussions held over the efficacy of the injunction and the real aims of the City Council. The injunctions were dissolved by the court in January 2021 and are no longer in effect.
