= List of Moorpark College alumni =

Moorpark College is a public community college in Moorpark, California in the United States. It was established in 1967. Following is a list of some of its notable alumni.

== Animal management ==
- Carol Buckley – founder of The Elephant Sanctuary in Tennessee
- Julie Scardina – animal ambassador for SeaWorld, Busch Gardens, and Discovery Cove zoological parks

== Art ==
- Carol Heyer – illustrator and children's author
- Matt Mahurin – illustrator, photographer, and film director
- Jeff Widener – photojournalist
- Dan Winters – photographer and photojournalist

== Business ==
- Troy Lyndon – entrepreneur and business coach

== Crime ==
- Elliot Rodger (did not graduate) – mass murderer

== Entertainment ==
- April Bowlby (did not graduate) – actor
- Brandon Boyd (did not graduate) – musician and member of Incubus
- Colbie Caillat (did not graduate) – pop singer/songwriter
- Jason Cook – actor
- Jason Dolley – actor and musician
- Aron Eisenberg – actor
- Diane Franklin – actress, producer, and model
- Nicole Johnson – Miss California 2010, Michael Phelps's wife
- Ross Malinger – actor
- Joshua Morrow – actor
- Isaiah Mustafa – actor
- Tabu Ley Rochereau – musician and singer
- Shane Van Dyke – actor

== Politics ==
- Anthony Loubet – Utah House of Representatives
- Mike Madrid – political strategist and political director for the California Republican Party

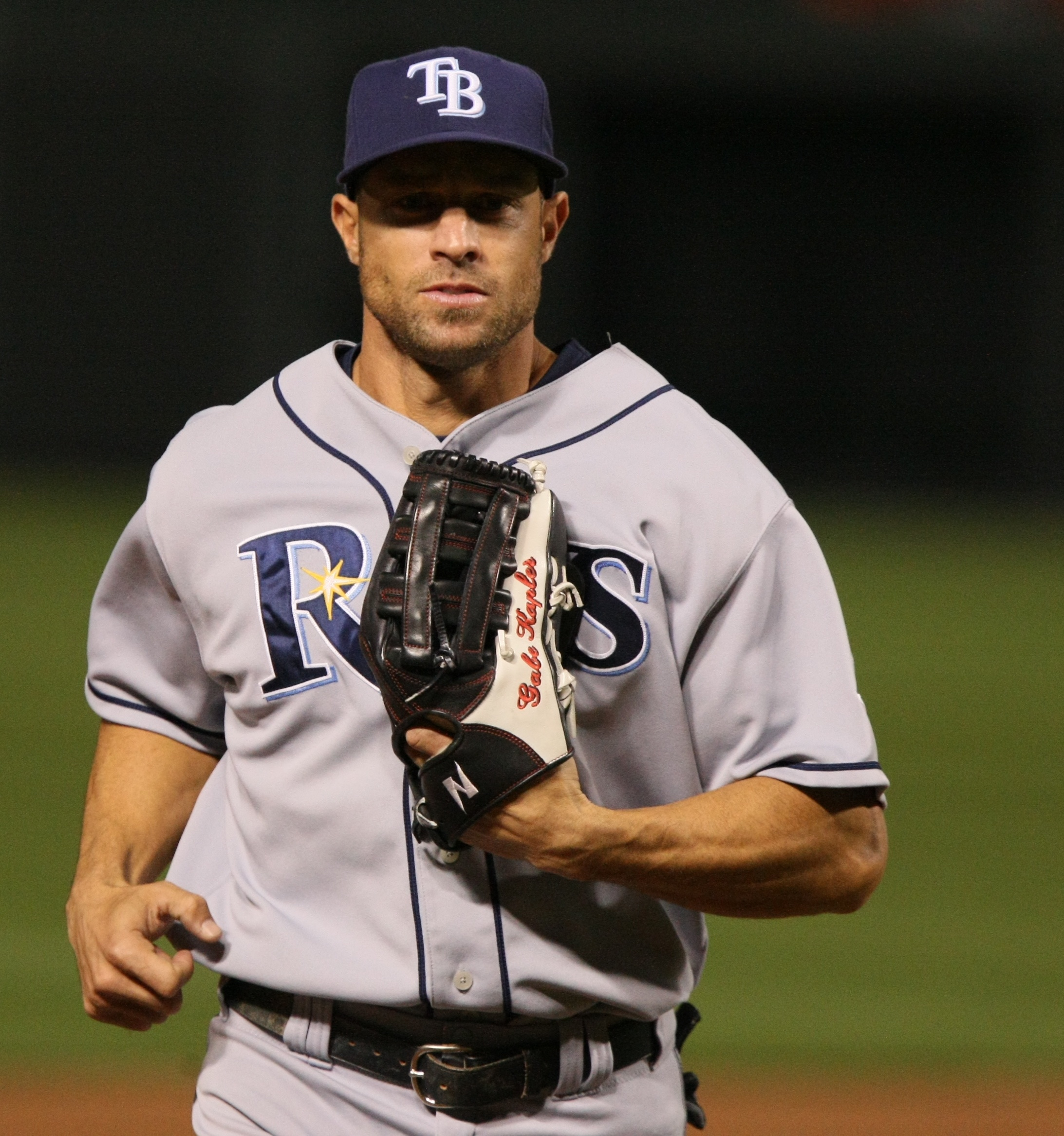
Gabe Kapler

== Sports ==
- Jamal Anderson – professional football player
- Sam Asghari – model and fitness trainer, ex-husband of Britney Spears
- Chris Beal (did not graduate) – mixed martial artist
- Freddie Bradley – professional football player
- Tom Briggs – gridiron football player
- Sam Crawford – professional basketball player
- Adam Flores – boxer and member of the 1996 Summer Olympics Mexican team
- Sean Gibbons – boxing promoter and former professional boxer
- Jeremiah Gray – professional basketball player
- Alex Hoffman-Ellis – professional football player
- Trevor Huddleston – racing driver
- Jack Jones – professional football player
- Gabe Kapler – professional baseball player and manager
- Eric King – professional baseball player
- Dave Laut – two-time NCAA shot-putter champion
- Ken Lutz – professional football player
- Eva Madarang – professional footballer
- Andrew Nardi – professional baseball player
- Jose Pasillas (did not graduate) – musician and member of Incubus
- Steve Wapnick – professional baseball player with the Detroit Tigers and the Chicago White Sox
- Justin Williams – competitive cyclist
