= Eduardo Garcia (boxer) =

Mexican boxer

Eduardo García is a Mexican boxing trainer and former amateur boxing champion. Originally from Urequio, Michoacán, he trained generations of boxers at the La Colonia Youth Boxing Club in Oxnard, California. Garcia learned to box from a priest in Mexico and fought in amateur shows to raise money for the local church. After immigrating to Southern California, Garcia would hang around local gyms when he could find time and get to know the fighters. He has trained Fernando Vargas as well as his sons, former IBF Super Featherweight Champion Robert and Mikey, the former WBO, and Ring Magazine Featherweight Champion. During his amateur career, Garcia had a record of 48–2.

== Notable boxers trained ==
- Fernando Vargas, former two-time World Champion and the youngest Light Middleweight Champion in the history of boxing.
- Robert Garcia, former NABF and IBF Super Featherweight Champion.
- Mikey Garcia, the current WBO, and Ring Magazine Featherweight Champion.
- Mia St. John, former WIBA, WIBF Lightweight, and current WBC Light Middleweight, Champion.
- Adam Flores, former Mexican Olympian and professional boxer in the Heavyweight division
- Victor Ortiz, former WBC welterweight champion.
