= Floyd Mayweather Jr. vs. Angel Manfredy =

Boxing match

- Date: December 19, 1998
- Venue: Miccosukee Resort & Gaming, Miami, Florida, U.S.
- Title(s) on the line: WBC super featherweight title

Tale of the tape
Boxer	Floyd Mayweather Jr.	Angel Manfredy
Nickname	Pretty Boy	El Diablo ("The Devil")
Hometown	Grand Rapids, Michigan, U.S.	Gary, Indiana, U.S.
Purse	$150,000	$150,000
Pre-fight record	18–0 (14 KO)	25–2–1 (1) (20 KO)
Age	21 years, 9 months	24 years, 1 month
Height	5 ft 8 in (173 cm)	5 ft 6 in (168 cm)
Weight	130 lb (59 kg)	130 lb (59 kg)
Style	Orthodox	Southpaw
Recognition	WBC; Super Featherweight Champion; The Ring; No. 8 ranked pound-for-pound fighter	WBC; No. 10 Ranked Super Featherweight; WBU; Super Featherweight Champion

Result
- Mayweather wins via 2nd-round TKO

Floyd Mayweather Jr. vs. Angel Manfredy was a professional boxing match contested on December 19, 1998, for the WBC super featherweight title.

== Background ==
Floyd Mayweather Jr. had captured his first world title at the age of 21 two months prior after defeating Genaro Hernández on October 3, 1998. Following his victory, Mayweather quickly entered negotiations with Angel Manfredy and the two fighters reached an agreement to face one another that same month with the fight set for December 19, 1998. Cable network HBO signed 24-year old contender Angel Manfredy to a multi-fight deal that would see him challenge Mayweather for the WBC super featherweight title with a further six more fights guaranteed should he defeat Mayweather but only one guaranteed should he lose. Manfredy, who had been considered to face Hernández for the super featherweight title before being passed over in favor of Mayweather, bluntly stated that "if I lose, I die. My career dies." Mayweather, already regarded as one of the top pound-for-pound fighters, entered the fight as a 5-2 favorite.

== The fights ==
=== Rahman vs. Tua ===
The featured undercard bout featured young up-and-coming heavyweights Hasim Rahman (IBF:2nd) and David Tua (WBC:4th, IBF:9th) facing each other in an IBF eliminator, with the winner becoming the mandatory challenger to either Evander Holyfield or Lennox Lewis, who were scheduled to meet for the undisputed heavyweight championship four months later.

==== The fight ====
Rahman was using his powerful jab well, out boxing Tua virtually every round. At the end of the 9th, Tua staggered Rahman with a devastating punch after the bell that dazed him. At the beginning of the next round Tua hit him with several heavy shots and the referee jumped in when Rahman was bobbing and weaving. Tua won by TKO. It was argued that it should have been a DQ following the illegal punch after the end of the 9th.

At the time of the stoppage, HBO's unofficial scorer Harold Lederman had the bout scored 87–84 for Rahman. All three of the official judges had it 89–82 for Rahman.

==== Aftermath ====
The stoppage was criticized by all three members of the HBO broadcast team (Jim Lampley, Larry Merchant and Roy Jones Jr.) as premature.

The two would rematch in March 2003.

Preceded by vs. Garing Lane	Hasim Rahman's bouts 19 December 1998	Succeeded by vs. Michael Rush
Preceded by vs. Eric Curry	David Tua's bouts 19 December 1998	Succeeded by vs. Gary Bell

=== Main Event ===
The two fighters fought a close first round with Mayweather starting off strong, using his superior hand speed and counter-punching, and controlled the first portion of the round though Manfredy did an effective job at cutting off the ring, pinning Mayweather against the ropes and landed some big shots of his own. However, in the second round, with about 40 seconds remaining, Mayweather stunned Manfredy with an overhand right, backed him into the ropes and landed around 20 unanswered punches, almost sending him down, though the ropes kept him up. As Manfredy was not fighting back, referee Frank Santore Jr. stopped the fight at 2:47 of the round. This would prove to be the quickest title defense in Mayweather's professional career.

== Fight card ==
Confirmed bouts:

Weight Class	Weight		vs.		Method	Round	Notes
Super Featherweight	130 lbs.	Floyd Mayweather Jr. (c)	def.	Angel Manfredy	TKO	2/12	^{note 1}
Heavyweight	200+ lbs.	David Tua	def.	Hasim Rahman	TKO	10/12	^{note 2}
Light Flyweight	108 lbs.	Jacob Matlala	def.	Rafael Orozco	UD	12/12	^{note 3}
Heavyweight	200+ lbs.	Maurice Harris	def.	Artis Pendergrass	TKO	4/10
Welterweight	147 lbs.	Alex Trujillo	def.	Eduardo Martinez	KO	1/8
Super Featherweight	130 lbs.	Ferid Ben Jeddou	def.	Carlos Gomez	TKO	5/8
Super Lightweight	140 lbs.	Wilfrido Ruiz	def.	Eldon Sneed	TKO	4/6
Super Welterweight	154 lbs.	David Díaz	def.	George Kellman	UD	6/6

^Note 1 For WBC Super Featherweight Title
^Note 2 For IBF USBA and Inter-Continental Heavyweight Titles / IBF Heavyweight Title Eliminator
^Note 3 For IBA Light Flyweight Title

== Broadcasting ==
Country	Broadcaster
United States	HBO

Preceded by vs. Genaro Hernández	Floyd Mayweather Jr.'s bouts 19 December 1998	Succeeded by vs. Carlos Rios
Preceded by vs. John Brown	Angel Manfredy's bouts 19 December 1998	Succeeded by vs. Ernesto Benitez
