= Standing Eight =

2006 non-fiction book by Adam Pitluk

- Author: Adam Pitluk
- Subject: Jesús Chávez
- Publisher: Da Capo Press
- Publication date: 2006
- ISBN: 9780786733767

Standing Eight is a 2006 non-fiction book by Adam Pitluk about Mexican boxer Jesús Chávez.

== Publication ==
Standing Eight: The Inspiring Story of Jesus "El Matador" Chavez is a 2006 book by Adam Pitluk, published by Da Capo Press.

== Synopsis ==
Standing Eight documents the protagonists's early life, born as Gabriel Sandoval in Hidalgo del Parra. Sandoval immigrates from Mexico to Chicago before learning boxing, joining a gang-life and robbery a shop. The robbery results in his imprisonment and deportation to Mexico. Chávez returns to the U.S., avoiding Chicago and selecting Austin, Texas, where he starts professional boxing, after adopting the name Jesús Chávez. His opponents including include Floyd Mayweather and Erik Morales. Chávez becomes the International Boxing Federation lightweight champion.

== Critical reception ==
Publishers Weekly described the prose as "stilted but serviceable." The School Library Journal praised Pitluk for appealing to both boxing fans and a wider audience by avoiding getting too much into the details of the actual fights. Texas Monthly described the book as "compelling".

== See also ==
- Damned to Eternity (by the same author)
