= Floyd Mayweather Jr. vs. Jesús Chávez =

Boxing match

The Next Generation
- Date: November 10, 2001
- Venue: Bill Graham Civic Auditorium, San Francisco, California, U.S.
- Title on the line: WBC super featherweight title

Tale of the tape
Boxer	Floyd Mayweather Jr.	Jesús Chávez
Nickname	Pretty Boy	El Matador ("The Killer")
Hometown	Grand Rapids, Michigan, U.S.	Austin, Texas, U.S.
Purse	$1,600,000	$400,000
Pre-fight record	26–0 (19 KO)	35–1 (24 KO)
Age	24 years, 8 months	28 years, 11 months
Height	5 ft 8 in (173 cm)	5 ft 5 in (165 cm)
Weight	129 lb (59 kg)	129 1/2 lb (59 kg)
Style	Orthodox	Orthodox
Recognition	WBC; Super Featherweight Champion; The Ring; No. 5 ranked pound-for-pound fighter	WBC; No. 1 Ranked Super Featherweight

Result
- Mayweather wins via 9th-round corner retirement

Floyd Mayweather Jr. vs. Jesús Chávez, billed as The Next Generation, was a professional boxing match contested on November 10, 2001, for the WBC and Lineal super featherweight title.

== Background ==
In his previous title defense on May 26, 2001, Floyd Mayweather Jr. persevered through injuries to both hands and his only professional knockdown to win a lopsided unanimous decision against Carlos Hernández. On the undercard, Jesús Chávez, the WBC's number-one ranked super featherweight contender and Mayweather's mandatory challenger and expected next opponent, defeated Juan José Arias, keeping his ranking and setting up a title fight between him and Mayweather for later in the year. The Mayweather–Chávez fight was originally scheduled for October 6, 2001, at the Paris Las Vegas, which had successfully bid $750,000 to bring the fight to their venue, but Mayweather postponed the fight after requiring emergency dental surgery in which he had all four of his wisdom teeth removed. The fight was rescheduled for November 10, but the Paris Las Vegas, citing a decline in tourism due to the September 11 attacks, declined to stage the fight under the original terms, forcing promoter Bob Arum to move the fight to San Francisco's Bill Graham Civic Auditorium. The Mayweather–Chávez fight was the first title fight to be held in the city of San Francisco since Dick Tiger defeated Gene Fullmer at Candlestick Park in 1962.

Mayweather's fight against Chávez was expected to be his final as a super featherweight, the division where he started and spent the most time in his pro career. Though he considered staying in the division for a unification bout against the then-, WBA super featherweight champion Joel Casamayor, he announced that he would move up to the lightweight to challenge the WBC lightweight champion José Luis Castillo immediately after his fight was Chávez was over.

Chávez, who had been the WBC's number-one ranked featherweight since 1998, had had problems with U.S. Immigration and Naturalization Service and had not been able to take advantage of his ranking as he had spent three years fighting outside the U.S. in his birth country Mexico. Though he had been in the U.S. since the age of 10, Chávez did not have U.S. citizenship and had been deported twice, first in 1994 after being convicted of a 1990 robbery in his adopted hometown Chicago after which he quickly returned and started his boxing career in Austin, Texas, and then again in 1997, when the INS discovered that Chávez had illegally returned to the U.S. After three years of being unable to enter the U.S. legally, he was finally allowed to re-enter the country in November 2000 and then granted permanent residency in February 2001, a month after picking up his first victory in the U.S. since October 1997.

== Fight Details ==
=== Pacquiao vs. Sánchez ===
The co featured bout saw IBF Super Bantamweight champion Manny Pacquiao make the first defence of his title against WBO titleholder Agapito Sánchez. This would mark the first time both Mayweather and Pacquiao appeared together on the same card.

==== The fight ====
The fight was marred by a series of fouls from the challenger, with numerous low blows. An accidental headbutt in the 2nd round caused a cut on Pacquiao’s right eyelid. Referee Marty Denkin deducted a point from Sánchez in both the 3rd and 4th round, the latter after Sánchez struck Pacquiao on the left leg before wrestling Pacquiao, causing him to grimace in pain as Denkin allowed a grace period of five minutes to recover from the foul, although the champion resumed after just two. In the 6th round, another clash of heads caused the cut on Pacquiao to worsen, prompting the ringside doctor to stop the bout and send it to the scorecards. Ricardo Bays scored it 58–54 for Pacquiao, Marshall Walker had it 57–55 for Sanchez and Raul Caiz saw it a draw 56–56 with Pacquiao retaining his belt by a technical split draw.

At the time of the stoppage, HBO's unofficial scorer Harold Lederman had it scored 58–54 for Pacquiao.

==== Aftermath ====
Speaking after the bout Pacquiao's trainer Freddie Roach criticized Sánchez's performance saying "I don’t think we’re gonna fight this guy again. He deliberately fouled us over and over. Yeah, he was penalized twice but he hit Manny low 20 more times that went unpunished. That guy’s a disgrace to boxing and should have his license pulled." His promoter Murad Muhammad said the champion had nothing to be ashamed of saying "Manny is a bigger star now because of the bad decision".

But Sánchez was unrepentant "[Pacquiao] cries too much. This is a championship fight. To be a champion, you have to have heart – he doesn’t have it. He cried and has no guts."

Preceded by vs. Lehlo Ledwaba	Manny Pacquiao's bouts 10 November 2001	Succeeded by vs. Jorge Eliécer Julio
Preceded by vs. Jorge Monsalvo	Agapito Sánchez's bouts 10 November 2001	Succeeded by vs. Joan Guzmán

=== Main Event ===
Chávez was extremely active, throwing 925 punches through nine rounds, but struggled to penetrate Mayweather's defense and landed 182 punches which equated to a 20% success rate. Mayweather, who admitted after the fight that his game plan was to let Chávez punch himself out, hung back and picked his spots, effectively counter punching and then as the fight went on was efficient in landed power punches, scoring 51% of the 317 he threw. In the later rounds of the fight, Chávez though still active, began to tire and Mayweather began to hit Chávez with big uppercuts. After finishing the ninth round, Chávez's trainer Ronnie Shields informed Chávez that he would not allow him to continue the fight telling him "you're getting hit too much now" and the fight was stopped, giving Mayweather the victory via corner retirement. Chávez maintained that the decision was not his but did not argue Shields' decision stating "I gave the best fighter in the world the best fight he's ever had. My corner stopped the fight. Ronnie Shields stopped the fight because he knows there will be many more nights for me to come."

At the time of the stoppage Lederman had it scored 86–85 for Mayweather.

== Fight card ==
Confirmed bouts:

Weight Class	Weight		vs.		Method	Round	Notes
Super Featherweight	130 lbs.	Floyd Mayweather Jr. (c)	def.	Jesús Chávez	RTD	9/12	^{note 1}
Super Bantamweight	122 lbs.	Manny Pacquiao (c)	vs.	Agapito Sánchez (c)	TD-D	6/12	^{note 2}
Welterweight	147 lbs.	Dmitry Salita	def.	Miguel Mares	TKO	3/4
Cruiserweight	190 lbs.	Jorge Kahwagi	def.	Perry Williams	TKO	1/4
Light Heavyweight	175 lbs.	Paul Briggs	def.	James Green	TKO	3/4
Welterweight	147 lbs.	Arturo Morales	def.	Mahan Washington	UD	4/4

^Note 1 For WBC Super Featherweight Title
^Note 2 For IBF and WBO Super Bantamweight Titles

== Broadcasting ==
Country	Broadcaster
United States	HBO

Preceded by vs. Carlos Hernández	Floyd Mayweather Jr.'s bouts 10 November 2001	Succeeded by vs. José Luis Castillo
Preceded by vs. Juan José Arias	Jesús Chávez's bouts 10 November 2001	Succeeded by vs. Gerardo Zayas
