= José Luis Castillo vs. Floyd Mayweather Jr. =

Boxing match

Clash of the Champions
- Date: April 20, 2002
- Venue: MGM Grand Garden Arena, Paradise, Nevada, U.S.
- Title(s) on the line: WBC and vacant The Ring lightweight titles

Tale of the tape
Boxer	José Luis Castillo	Floyd Mayweather Jr.
Nickname	El Temible ("The Fearsome")	Pretty Boy
Hometown	Empalme, Sonora, Mexico	Grand Rapids, Michigan, U.S.
Purse	$1,100,000	$2,200,000
Pre-fight record	45–4–1 (41 KO)	27–0 (20 KO)
Age	28 years, 4 months	25 years, 1 month
Height	5 ft 7 1/2 in (171 cm)	5 ft 8 in (173 cm)
Weight	134 lb (61 kg)	134 lb (61 kg)
Style	Orthodox	Orthodox
Recognition	WBC; Lightweight Champion	WBC; Super Featherweight Champion; The Ring No. 5 ranked pound-for-pound fighter

Result
- Mayweather wins via unanimous decision (116–111, 115–111, 115–111)

José Luis Castillo vs. Floyd Mayweather Jr., billed as Clash of the Champions, was a professional boxing match contested on April 20, 2002, for the WBC and The Ring lightweight titles.

== Background ==
Immediately following his eighth successful title defense over Jesús Chávez in November 2001, reigning WBC super featherweight champion Floyd Mayweather Jr. announced that after 27 fights in the division, the Chávez fight would be his last as a super featherweight and he would be moving up to lightweight to challenge the WBC lightweight champion José Luis Castillo. Mayweather admitted his decision was influenced by his struggles to make the 130-pound super featherweight limit saying in a post-fight interview that he had not eaten in the four days prior to fighting Chávez in order to make the weight.

Though he was coming into his first fight at lightweight, Mayweather, ranked as one of the best pound-for-pound fighter, was a 5–1 favorite over Castillo. However, Mayweather ran into trouble in the month preceding the fight when he was convicted on two counts of domestic violence though he accepted a plea bargain and was given a suspended sentence, avoiding prison and allowing him to go through with his fight with Castillo. In an article in the Las Vegas Sun, lawyer John Moran III questioned as to why Mayweather was still licensed to box in Nevada given his numerous legal troubles, though Mayweather's then-promoter Bob Arum defended Mayweather and denied his personal problems would affect his fight against Castillo stating that Mayweather was "really focused. Honestly, he doesn't appear distracted at all."

== The fight ==
Mayweather started the fight strong, cruising through the first five rounds with relative ease as he landed punches almost at will and mosty avoided Castillo's offense as Castillo struggled to get inside and was outboxed by Mayweather. However, in the sixth round, Castillo fought aggressively and was finally able to get to Mayweather and landed clean shots to the head and body from then on. Each fighter was penalized a point in the later rounds; Castillo in the eighth for hitting Mayweather during a break and Mayweather in the tenth for using his elbows. After a close 12 rounds, the fight went to the judge's scorecards with Mayweather winning rather comfortably with two scores of 115–111 and one score of 116–111.

Despite losing, Castillo had a clear advantage in punches, landing 203 to Mayweather's 157 while also dominating in the number of power punches landed scoring 173 to Mayweather's 66.

HBO unofficial scorer Harold Lederman scored the fight 115–111 in Castillo's favor, while the Associated Press had Mayweather the winner 115–111 and USA Today boxing columnist Dan Rafael had the fight even at 114–114.

== Fight card ==
Confirmed bouts:

Weight Class	Weight		vs.		Method	Round	Notes
Lightweight	135 lbs.	Floyd Mayweather Jr.	def.	José Luis Castillo	UD	12/12	^{note 1}
Lightweight	135 lbs.	Stevie Johnston	def.	Alejandro González	MD	12/12
Lightweight	135 lbs.	Cristián Bejarano	def.	Ruben Galvan	UD	6/6
Super Flyweight	115 lbs.	Elena Reid	def.	Elena Luz Rodriguez	UD	4/4

^Note 1 For WBC and vacant The Ring lightweight titles

== Broadcasting ==
Country	Broadcaster
United Kingdom	Sky Sports
United States	HBO

Preceded by vs. Juan Angel Macias	José Luis Castillo's bouts 20 April 2002	Succeeded by vs. Verdell Smith
Preceded by vs. Jesús Chávez	Floyd Mayweather Jr.'s bouts 20 April 2002	Succeeded by Rematch
