= Floyd Mayweather Jr. vs. Carlos Hernández =

Boxing match

- Date: May 26, 2001
- Venue: Van Andel Arena, Grand Rapids, Michigan, U.S.
- Title(s) on the line: WBC super featherweight title

Tale of the tape
Boxer	Floyd Mayweather Jr.	Carlos Hernández
Nickname	Pretty Boy	El Famoso ("The Famous")
Hometown	Grand Rapids, Michigan, U.S.	Soyapango, El Salvador
Purse	$2,000,000	$210,000
Pre-fight record	25–0 (19 KO)	33–2–1 (21 KO)
Age	24 years, 3 months	28 years, 4 months
Height	5 ft 8 in (173 cm)	5 ft 6 in (168 cm)
Weight	130 lb (59 kg)	128 1/2 lb (58 kg)
Style	Orthodox	Orthodox
Recognition	WBC; Super Featherweight Champion; The Ring; No. 5 ranked pound-for-pound fighter	WBC; No. 8 Ranked Super Featherweight

Result
- Mayweather wins via unanimous decision (119–109, 117–109, 116–111)

Floyd Mayweather Jr. vs. Carlos Hernández was a professional boxing match contested on May 26, 2001, for the WBC super featherweight title.

== Fight Details ==
Entering the fight with what he called "two messed up hands", Mayweather nonetheless overcame his injuries to win a lopsided unanimous decision. Though overmatched, Hernández proved to be a game opponent for Mayweather. Pressing forward throughout the fight, Hernández threw over 100 punches more than Mayweather, but Mayweather's defense held him to landing just 172 of the 676 punches he threw for a 25% success rate while Mayweather landed at a much higher rate, scoring 241 of 520 punches, Mayweather was effective with the jab, which, due to his injured hands, he threw from both his natural orthodox stance and the southpaw stance, landing 63 compared to Hernández, who only managed to land 7. The most memorable moment of the fight came in the sixth round. After landing a left hook to the head of Hernández with around 20 seconds left in the round, Mayweather bent over in pain and touched the canvas with his left hand, causing referee Dale Grable to rule it a knockdown and give Mayweather a standing eight-count. This knockdown would be the only one Mayweather would suffer in his professional career. Following the injury to the sixth, Mayweather switched between orthodox and southpaw and peppered Hernández with jabs and combinations through the final round. All three judges scored the fight overwhelmingly in Mayweather's favor; 119–109, 117–109 and 116–111.

== Aftermath ==
Mayweather called the fight "one of the toughest nights of my career" and praised Hernández as a "very, very tough fighter" though he admitted to be "disappointed" in his performance which blamed on the injuries to both hands. Hernández, however, was unimpressed by Mayweather's performance, complaining that all Mayweather did was "pepper me with jabs" and "just kept running from me."

== Fight card ==
Confirmed bouts:

Weight Class	Weight		vs.		Method	Round	Notes
Super Featherweight	130 lbs.	Floyd Mayweather Jr. (c)	def.	Carlos Hernández	UD	12/12	^{note 1}
Super Featherweight	130 lbs.	Jesús Chávez (c)	def.	Juan José Arias	UD	12/12	^{note 2}
Middleweight	160 lbs.	Ian Gardner	def.	Troy Rowland	SD	4/4
Super Featherweight	130 lbs.	Steve Trumble	def.	Raymundo Beltran	MD	4/4
Super Middleweight	164 lbs.	Verdell Smith	vs.	Dexter Williams	D	4/4
Super Lightweight	140 lbs.	Cristián Bejarano	def.	Chris Burford	TKO	1/4

^Note 1 For WBC Super Featherweight Title
^Note 2 For NABF Super Featherweight Title

== Broadcasting ==
Country	Broadcaster
United States	HBO

Preceded by vs. Diego Corrales	Floyd Mayweather Jr.'s bouts 26 May 2001	Succeeded by vs. Jesús Chávez
Preceded by vs. Sandro Marcos	Carlos Hernández's bouts 26 May 2001	Succeeded by vs. Juan Angel Macias
