= Snake Eyes (1998 film) =

1998 film by Brian De Palma

- Theatrical release poster
- Directed by: Brian De Palma
- Screenplay by: David Koepp
- Story by: Brian De Palma; David Koepp
- Produced by: Brian De Palma
- Starring: Nicolas Cage; Gary Sinise; John Heard; Carla Gugino; Stan Shaw; Kevin Dunn
- Cinematography: Stephen H. Burum
- Edited by: Bill Pankow
- Music by: Ryuichi Sakamoto
- Production company: DeBart Productions
- Distributed by: Paramount Pictures (North America); Touchstone Pictures (International; through Buena Vista International)
- Release date: August 7, 1998
- Running time: 98 minutes
- Country: United States
- Language: English
- Budget: $73 million
- Box office: $103.9 million

Snake Eyes is a 1998 American mystery thriller film directed and produced by Brian De Palma. The film stars Nicolas Cage as Rick Santoro, a detective investigating a political assassination at a boxing match in Atlantic City, with supporting roles played by Gary Sinise, Carla Gugino, John Heard, Stan Shaw, Kevin Dunn, Joel Fabiani and Luis Guzmán. De Palma also devised the story with David Koepp, who was the sole writer of the screenplay. The musical score was composed by Ryuichi Sakamoto.

The film was released and produced by Paramount Pictures in North America and Buena Vista International (through Touchstone Pictures) internationally on August 7, 1998. The film garnered mixed reviews from critics, criticizing the film's story, writing and pacing while praising its style and the performances. It grossed $104 million worldwide against a $73 million budget.

== Plot ==
During a tropical storm, corrupt Atlantic City police detective Rick Santoro attends a boxing match at the soon-to-close local arena between heavyweight champion Lincoln Tyler and challenger Jose Pacifico Ruiz. He meets up with his best friend since childhood, U.S. Navy Commander Kevin Dunne, who is escorting Defense Secretary Charles Kirkland and Arena director Gilbert Powell at the fight after a trip to Norfolk, Virginia.

As the first round begins, Kevin notices redhead Serena who wears a ruby ring; he leaves his seat which is then taken by Julia Costello, a platinum blonde in a white satin suit. When Ruiz unexpectedly knocks out Tyler, gunshots ring out, mortally wounding Kirkland and grazing Julia, who loses her blonde wig, revealing her naturally dark hair. Kevin kills the sniper and orders the arena to be locked down. Julia escapes into the casino.

Rick notices the supposedly knocked-out Tyler awoke at the sound of shots, and studies the fight tape which reveals the knockout punch didn't connect. Tyler confesses he threw the fight to pay gambling debts. Serena paid him to take a dive. Suspecting a conspiracy, Rick reveals everything he has learned to Kevin, who says the Norfolk trip was to test the AirGuard missile defense system, which Powell's company is backing. He deduces that the sniper, Palestinian terrorist Tarik Ben Rabat, assassinated Kirkland over the Pentagon's defense cooperation with Israel.

Rick studies surveillance footage to find Serena and Zeitz while Kevin searches for Julia, aided by Powell's security guards. Kevin is actually the conspiracy mastermind. He kills Serena and Zeitz and enlists Tyler.

Julia seduces a hotel guest so she can hide in his room. Rick finds her after intercepting a throw and takes her into protective custody. Julia confesses she is an analyst and had discovered the AirGuard test results were faked. She had tipped off Kirkland, but Kevin discovered her actions and arranged the conspiracy to kill her and Kirkland. After hiding Julia in a warehouse, Rick finds footage proving Kevin's guilt.

Kevin confesses to Rick, saying his motive was to prevent further attacks on U.S. ships, like one in which Kevin had had to leave 28 men to drown. He offers Rick one million dollars for Julia's location. When Rick refuses Kevin has Tyler beat him up, then plants a tracker on Rick and follows him to the warehouse just as Hurricane Jezebel hits. Rick uses a large wave as cover to rush Julia outside, where the police witness Kevin opening fire. Despite his protests that Julia is a suspect, Kevin goes around the corner and shoots himself, committing suicide on live network television.

Rick is hailed as a hero, but the press uncover his corruption and he loses his job, mistress, and family. Before reporting for his prison term, Rick meets Julia. She thanks him, as Powell is scrapping the AirGuard. Rick promises to call her when he gets out in twelve to eighteen months. Serena's ruby ring is seen embedded in a concrete pillar of the new Powell Millennium Arena.

== Cast ==
- Nicolas Cage as Detective Rick Santoro, Atlantic City PD
- Gary Sinise as Commander Kevin Dunne, USN
- Carla Gugino as Julia Costello
- John Heard as Gilbert Powell
- Stan Shaw as Lincoln Tyler
- Kevin Dunn as Lou Logan
- Michael Rispoli as Jimmy George
- Joel Fabiani as SecDef Charles Kirkland
- Luis Guzmán as Cyrus
- David Anthony Higgins as Ned Campbell
- Mike Starr as Walt McGahn
- Peter McRobbie as Gordon Pritzker
- Tamara Tunie as Anthea
- Chip Zien as Mickey Alter
- Alain Goulem as PPV Director
- Jayne Heitmeyer as Serena
- Chip Chuipka as Zeitz
- Éric Hoziel as Tarik Ben Rabat
- Richard Zeman as Dunne's Agent #1
- Richard Lemire as Dunne's Agent #2
- Mark Camacho as C.J.
- Christina Fulton as Roundgirl
- Jernard Burks as Tyler's Bodyguard
- Christian Napoli as Michael Santoro
- Adam Flores as Jose Pacifico Ruiz

== Production ==
=== Casting ===
Brian De Palma offered the role of Commander Kevin Dunne to Al Pacino but he turned it down. Will Smith was then cast as Dunne but later dropped out of the role as he wasn't offered enough money. He would eventually star in Enemy of the State instead.

=== Filming ===
The majority of Snake Eyes was filmed on studio sets and the Montreal Forum in Montreal, Canada. The production spent two weeks on-location in Atlantic City, New Jersey, filming at the Trump Taj Mahal Hotel & Casino (now the Hard Rock Hotel & Casino Atlantic City).

=== Unused original ending ===
Snake Eyes' original ending involved a huge tidal wave going through the casino. This visual effects-heavy ending was cut and replaced with a reshot sequence in post-production, but numerous references to it still remain in the final film. A shot near the end of the film shows an ambulance driving down an oceanside road with a wave about to crash into it before the film cuts to another shot, Rick Santoro (Nicolas Cage) talks about almost drowning at the very end of the film, and references to a storm are made throughout the entire film, which were all meant to build up to the cut climax.

== Reception ==
Released on August 7, 1998, Snake Eyes debuted at No. 2 on its opening weekend (behind Saving Private Ryan), with $16.31 million, beating out the weekend's other wide release Halloween H20: 20 Years Later at $16.19 million. It grossed $55.6 million in North America, and $103.9 million worldwide.

=== Critical response ===
The film received a 43% "rotten" score on Rotten Tomatoes based on 72 reviews with the critics' consensus: "Snake Eyes has a number of ingredients that promise a trashy fun time; unfortunately, they're lost in an energetic and stylish thriller with a frustratingly hollow core." On Metacritic, the film has a weighted average score of 52 out of 100 based on reviews from 24 critics, indicating "mixed or average reviews". Audiences surveyed by CinemaScore gave the film a grade "C+" on scale of A+ to F. De Palma himself responded to the criticisms in an interview with Mark Cousins, "There's a lot of discussion in Snake Eyes about why do we reveal who did it so soon. Well, the problem is that it isn't about who did it. It's a mystery about a relationship, two people, and how finding that out affects their relationship ... those kinds of procedural movies are extremely boring..."

=== Accolades ===
Award	Category	Subject	Result
Blockbuster Entertainment Awards	Favorite Actor – Suspense	Nicolas Cage	Won
Blockbuster Entertainment Awards	Favorite Supporting Actor – Suspense	Gary Sinise	Nominated
Blockbuster Entertainment Awards	Favorite Supporting Actress – Suspense	Carla Gugino	Nominated
Cahiers du Cinéma	Annual Top 10 Lists	Brian De Palma	9th place

== Home media ==
Snake Eyes was restored in a 4K Blu-ray edition, released by Kino Lorber in 2024. Neither De Palma's original cut of the film nor any additional unreleased footage is included.

Previously, when asked about the lost ending in a 2013 interview for The Playlist, De Palma explained his vision: "The whole idea at the end of Snake Eyes was deus ex machina. We were dealing with such a corrupt world that the only way to solve the problem is to have a hurricane come through and wipe it all away. [...] But it didn't work in the previews so we did this other ending which I don't think is as effective. We did shoot this big wave that swept through the casino but we ultimately cut it out." He remained open to the idea of restoring his original cut, saying, "Well it was like when they made the special version of Casualties of War, I put in two scenes that were cut out from the initial release and I was very happy to put them back in. If they came to me and said, 'We're thinking about doing a new version,' I'd be happy to do it."

== See also ==
- List of films featuring surveillance
- List of American films of 1998
