= Adam Flores =

American boxer (born 1970)

Personal information
- Nickname: The Bomb
- Born: Adam Flores Cruz; August 27, 1970 (age 55) Mexico
- Height: 6 ft 3 in (192 cm)
- Weight: Heavyweight

Boxing career
- Reach: 77 in (197 cm)
- Stance: Orthodox

Boxing record
- Total fights: 14
- Wins: 9
- Win by KO: 6
- Losses: 5
- Draws: 0
- No contests: 0

Adam Flores Cruz (born August 27, 1970) is a Mexican/American former professional boxer in the heavyweight division. He was a member of the 1996 Mexican Olympic Selection team that went on to compete in the 1996 Olympic Box offs in Halifax, Canada and was trained by Eduardo Garcia at La Colonia Boxing Club.

== Amateur career ==
Adam was a standout athlete both in football and wrestling at Buena High, capturing the 1988 Wrestling C.I.F 3A Division Heavyweight Championship and in Moorpark College where he earned All-State, All-American along with Most Valuable Wrestler (MVP) and Team Captain award honors. He also earned a spot on the Mexican Selection Team to compete in the 1996 Olympics Box Off's in Halifax, Canada.

== Professional career ==
In April 2000, Flores took out the undefeated Gregory Dial by first-round K.O. The bout was held in Salem, Oregon.

== Training career ==
After his fighting career was over, he started up the World Crown Sports Training Center. Where prospects and world champions train.

=== TEAM/Training Camps ===
- Sergio Martínez, a two-time World Champion. A Pound 4 Pound King, in the top 3 list next to Floy Mayweather Jr. and Manny Pacquiao.
- Rogelio Vargas, undefeated prospect and brother of former World Champion Fernando Vargas.
- Lucas Matthysse, a top rated Light Welterweight.
- Javier Fortuna, an undefeated Featherweight prospect.

== Film appearance ==
Flores was in the film Snake Eyes as the boxer José "Pacifico" Ruiz, where he knocks out Stan Shaw's character heavyweight champion Lincoln Tyler.
