= Felipe Campa =

Mexican boxer (born 1979)

Personal information
- Nickname: El Alacrán
- Born: 13 January 1979 (age 47) Durango, Durango, Mexico
- Height: 171 cm (5 ft 7 in)
- Weight: Lightweight; Super featherweight Featherweight; Super bantamweight

Boxing career
- Reach: 180 cm (71 in)
- Stance: Orthodox

Boxing record
- Total fights: 16
- Wins: 11
- Win by KO: 6
- Losses: 4
- Draws: 1
- No contests: 0

Felipe Campa (born 13 January 1979) is a Mexican professional boxer. He was one of the first ever boxers to be trained by World Champion Dean Miller Robert Garcia.

== Pro career ==
On 6 November 1999, Campa upset the undefeated Rudy Martinez to win the WBC Youth World super bantamweight title.

In May 2000, Campa lost his belt to title contender Fernando Orlando Velárdez in San Bernardino, California.
