= La Colonia Youth Boxing Club =

Boxim gym in Colonia, Oxnard, California

La Colonia Youth Boxing Club is a boxing gym on 1st Street in La Colonia, a neighborhood in Oxnard, California. Notable Mexican American boxers train at the gym and future boxers are also brought up there.

== Gym ==
The gym is a place where members of the community can train and box. It is complete with punching bags, workout machines, lockers, bathrooms, weight sets, speed bags, and a ring. The owners and trainers of the gym take young boxers to amateur fights throughout southern California to compete against similar gyms.

== Notable fighters ==
It has produced such notable Mexican American fighters as Fernando Vargas, Robert Garcia, Miguel Angel Garcia, Victor Ortíz, and Brandon Rios. Robert Garcia, a former IBF World Champion, is the head trainer. His father Eduardo Garcia is a former amateur boxer and is also a trainer.

Fernando Vargas, a former resident of La Colonia, is still a regular fixture at the gym. Victor Ortíz trained at the gym after moving to Oxnard from Garden City. Daniel Cervantes, junior flyweight champion Brian Viloria, and Mia St. John have trained there.
