= James Scott (criminal) =

American criminal (born 1969)

- Born: James Robert Scott; November 20, 1969 (age 56); Quincy, Illinois, U.S.
- Spouse: Suzie Scott (divorced)
- Status: Imprisoned at Jefferson City Correctional Center, earliest possible release 2026
- Conviction: Causing a catastrophe
- Penalty: Life imprisonment

James Robert Scott (born November 20, 1969) is an American who was convicted of causing a massive flood of the Mississippi River at West Quincy, Missouri as part of the Great Flood of 1993. Scott is currently serving a life sentence with parole eligibility in a Missouri prison. The 2007 book Damned to Eternity and a 2022 Vice News documentary have been critical of Scott's conviction.

== Early life ==
Scott grew up in Quincy, Illinois. By his twenties, he had a criminal record and had served time in six prisons. While most of these arrests were for burglary, they also included two for arson. In 1982, he burned down his elementary school, Webster Elementary School in Quincy. In 1988, he burned down a garage and set several other fires, getting him a sentence of seven years in prison.

By 1993, Scott was out of prison on parole for the 1988 fire. He worked at a Burger King in Quincy and spent most of his nights drinking heavily.

== Flood ==
During flooding on the Mississippi River in 1993, the Scotts, along with several other residents living in and around Quincy and Hannibal, spent much of mid-July reinforcing the West Quincy levee. By July 16, the river had stopped rising and had dropped 1.5 feet (46 cm) below the levee. That night, however, the levee unexpectedly failed when the river burst through its main stem. The resulting flood inundated 14,000 acres (57 km^{2}) on the Missouri side of the river. In one incident, a barge was sucked into the levee and slammed into a gas station, causing a fire.

The flood washed out all of the bridges in the area—the only links across the river for 200 miles (320 km). While no one was killed, many people on the Missouri side of the river had to drive 80 miles (130 km) to either St. Louis or Burlington, Iowa, fly, or take a ferry to get across the river for several weeks after the waters receded. One major bridge, the Bayview Bridge, was out of service for 71 days. Several businesses in West Quincy were also destroyed, most of which have never returned.

Reporter Michele McCormack of WGEM-TV, the NBC affiliate in Quincy, was told by two Department of Transport workers at the edge of the bridge that a man standing close by was first on the scene. She walked up to him and Scott volunteered to do a live interview with her and photographer Rick Junkerman. Scott said that he had seen a weak spot on the levee and tried to put more sandbags along it. He then said he went for a drink, only to come back and discover the levee had let go. He then helped the Coast Guard load boats into the floodwaters. In a second interview with McCormack at his home which aired after his arrest, he told a similar story.

== Investigation ==
Scott's account of the flood sounded suspicious to Neal Baker, a sergeant with the Quincy Police Department. Baker was familiar with Scott; he had arrested Scott for the 1982 and 1988 arsons while he was a patrolman. For one thing, Baker noticed that Scott looked too clean to have been working on a levee all day. He also had trouble recalling simple details about working on the levee. Baker also noticed that Scott was not wearing a life jacket.

Missouri authorities were also suspicious. The levee had failed at one of its strongest points, and that area had been inspected two hours earlier, although later, two independent soil-science experts testified there was strong evidence the levee failed due to natural causes. They became even more suspicious when they found out about Scott's extensive criminal record, including the arsons. Adams County, Illinois, sheriff's deputies questioned him a week after the flood, and he was unable to keep his story straight.

On October 1, Quincy police arrested Scott on an unrelated burglary charge. During questioning, he admitted to pulling four sandbags from one portion of the levee and moving them to the trouble spot he had claimed to have seen. He told police, "My town was in trouble. The folks in Quincy and in West Quincy were about to lose everything. That’s why I went down to that levee. I had no plans to hurt anything. They needed help, so I helped." While he denied any intent to cause any harm, he said, "I didn't mean to cause a problem but I did... I'm up shit creek." He was released after an hour and a half. However, he was convicted of burglary in January 1994 and sentenced to 10 years in prison.

== Trial ==
Meanwhile, authorities on both sides of the river joined federal authorities to investigate the case. Their investigation eventually led to Joe Flachs, an old friend of Scott's. Flachs told authorities that Scott had told him he had broken the levee so he could strand his wife, Suzie, on the Missouri side of the river. Suzie worked as a waitress at a truck stop in Taylor, Missouri. As the story went, Scott wanted to be free to party, fish, and have an affair. Investigators subsequently found other witnesses who said Scott boasted about breaking the levee at a party after the flood. Based on this evidence, Scott was taken to Missouri for trial in November 1994.

Scott was tried under a 1979 Missouri law that made it a crime to intentionally cause a catastrophe. The law, codified as Section 569.070 of the Missouri Revised Statutes, defined a catastrophe as "death or serious physical injury to ten or more people or substantial damage to five or more buildings or inhabitable structures or substantial damage to a vital public facility which seriously impairs its usefulness or operation." Due to publicity, the trial took place in Kirksville, 68 miles (109 km) west of West Quincy.

Prosecutors and investigators believed that Scott either removed or cut the plastic sheets covering the levee, then burrowed through the sand until the water rushed in. The defense rested largely on two soil-science experts who testified there was strong evidence the levee failed due to natural causes. David Hammer of the University of Missouri said there had been "something like 11 or 12 levee failures" upriver from West Quincy, and Charles Morris of the University of Missouri-Rolla said a last-minute decision to bring in bulldozers to shore up the levee actually weakened its structural integrity. The prosecution presented numerous witnesses claiming to have heard Scott bragging about breaking the levee, and pointed to the inconsistencies in his story.

After a three-day trial, the jury deliberated for four hours and then convicted Scott of causing a catastrophe. A month later, he was sentenced to life in prison, to run consecutively with his 10-year burglary sentence in Illinois.

Scott appealed, and on February 25, 1997, the Missouri Court of Appeals threw out the conviction due to prosecutorial misconduct. Prosecutors had not told the defense about two witnesses who reportedly heard Scott say he had deliberately broken the levee. He was retried in 1998, and convicted a second time after three hours of deliberation on April 30. The original sentence was reinstated on July 6.

Among those who testified against James Scott was Norman Haerr, then president of the Fabius River Drainage District and the largest owner of land on the Missouri side of the river directly affected by the flood. According to a Vice News documentary, Haerr received an insurance payout for damages caused to his land, although he did not have flood insurance. Since the flood was determined to have been caused by vandalism, rather than a natural disaster, Haerr was able to collect on his homeowner's insurance. Haerr did not disclose his financial interest in Scott's conviction at his trial.

== Post-trial ==
According to the September 8, 2017 Criminal podcast episode titled "Catastrophe" that features Scott, he is eligible for parole in 2026. He maintains his innocence.

Journalism professor Adam Pitluk's 2007 book Damned to Eternity is critical of Scott's conviction. The 2022 Vice News documentary Overlooked was also critical.

James Robert Scott was approved for release on parole July 6, 2028 following a parole hearing held July 22, 2026.
