= Adam Pitluk =

American journalist, author and academic

- Education: University of Missouri (bachelor's degree) Columbia University Graduate School of Journalism (master's) University of Oklahoma (PhD)
- Occupations: Journalist and author
- Employer: Midwest Luxury Publishing
- Notable work: Standing Eight (2006 book); Damned to Eternity (2007 book)
- Website: adampitluk.com

Adam Pitluk is an American investigative journalist, author and academic. He is the founder of Midwest Luxury Publishing and Groom Lake Media. As of June 2026, he is the President/CEO of the North American Travel Journalists Association (NATJA). He has since relocated the headquarters from Los Angeles, California, to Dallas, Texas, with satellite offices in Denver, Colorado, and Myrtle Beach, South Carolina.

He is the author of the 2006 non-fiction book about Mexican boxer Jesús Chávez titled Standing Eight and the 2007 non-fiction book about U.S. criminal James Scott titled Damned to Eternity.

== Biography ==
From 1995 to 1999, Pitluk studied journalism at the University of Missouri and worked at the Columbia Missourian while studying. He has a master's degree from the Columbia University Graduate School of Journalism and a Ph.D. from the University of Oklahoma.

He first met convicted vandal James Scott while working at the Columbia Missourian. As an adult, Pitluk relocated to Texas.

After graduation, Pitluk worked as a reporter at People and Time magazines, as an editor for the Dallas Morning News and editor-in-chief of American Way

Pitluk is the author of the 2006 non-fiction book Standing Eight about the Mexican boxer Jesús Chávez. He is also the author of the 2007 non-fiction crime book Damned to Eternity. The book documents and critiques the criminal conviction of James Scott, who was found guilty of damaging a levee in 1993, causing flooding. Pitluk contributed to the 2022 Vice News documentary Overlooked which examined the criminal conviction of Scott.
