= Harold Warren =

American boxer

Personal information
- Nickname: Ray Ray
- Nationality: American
- Born: Harold Ray Warren; September 7, 1960 (age 66) Corpus Christi, Texas, U.S.
- Height: 5 ft 6 in (168 cm)
- Weight: Super Featherweight; Featherweight

Boxing career
- Reach: 68 in (173 cm)
- Stance: Southpaw

Boxing record
- Total fights: 63
- Wins: 43
- Win by KO: 21
- Losses: 15
- No contests: 5

Harold Ray Warren (born September 7, 1960) is an American former professional boxer in the Welterweight division. He is a former NABF Featherweight, WBC International Super Featherweight and WBO NABO Lightweight champion.

== Professional career ==
Harold destroyed Darryl Pinckney to earn the NABF Featherweight championship.

=== WBA Super Featherweight Championship ===
In November 1993, he lost a twelve-round decision to WBA Super Featherweight Champion Genaro Hernandez.

=== IBF Super Featherweight Championship ===
On October 24, 1998, Warren lost to Robert Garcia and his chance at the IBF Super Featherweight Champion, the bout was at the Miccosukee Resort in Miami, Florida.

== Professional boxing record ==
63 fights	43 wins	15 losses
By knockout	21	3
By decision	22	12
No contests	5	
