= Ramón Ledón =

Cuban boxer (born 1965)

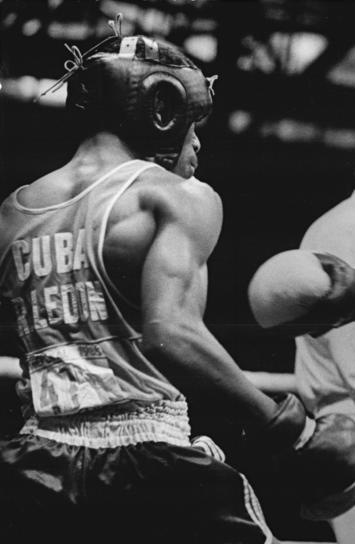
- Ledón in 1985

Personal information
- Born: Ramón Ledón González; 23 February 1965 (age 61) Havana, Cuba
- Height: 1.82 m (6 ft 0 in)
- Weight: Welterweight; Lightweight; Super Featherweight

Boxing career
- Reach: 189 cm (74 in)
- Stance: Southpaw

Boxing record
- Total fights: 15
- Wins: 13
- Win by KO: 10
- Losses: 1
- Draws: 1
- No contests: 0
Medal record
Men's Boxing
Representing Cuba
Friendship Games
Gold medal – first place	1984 Havana	Bantamweight

Ramón Ledón González (born 23 February 1965) is a Cuban former professional boxer who competed from 1995 to 1999. He challenged for the IBF super featherweight title in 1998. One of the best amateur boxers of his era.

== Amateur career ==
As a member of the Cuban national team, Ledón won the bantamweight division at the 1984 Friendship Games held in Havana, Cuba.

== Professional career ==
In March 1998, Ledón defeated John Bailey to get a shot at IBF Super Featherweight Champion Robert Garcia.

=== IBF Super Featherweight Championship ===
On 24 October 1998, Ledón lost to Robert Garcia and his chance at the IBF Super Featherweight Champion in Trump Taj Mahal, Atlantic City, New Jersey.
