= More than Famous =

- Directed by: Graham Rich
- Produced by: Evan Klinger
- Starring: Carlos 'Famoso' Hernández
- Release date: 2003
- Country: United States
- Language: English

More Than Famous is a documentary film about Salvadoran-American boxer Carlos 'Famoso' Hernández. It was produced and directed by Graham Rich. The film follows Hernández's fights in 2001 against Floyd Mayweather Jr. and Juan Angel Macias. The film won the Grand Festival Award at the 2003 Berkeley Video & Film Festival. This was the first collaboration between director Graham Rich and producer Evan Klinger, who both attended the University of California, Santa Cruz.
