= Genaro Hernández =

American boxer (1966–2011)

Personal information
- Nickname: Chicanito
- Born: May 10, 1966 Los Angeles, California, U.S.
- Died: June 7, 2011 (aged 45) Mission Viejo, California, U.S.
- Height: 5 ft 11 in (180 cm)
- Weight: Super featherweight; Lightweight

Boxing career
- Reach: 72 in (183 cm)
- Stance: Orthodox

Boxing record
- Total fights: 41
- Wins: 38
- Win by KO: 17
- Losses: 2
- Draws: 1

Genaro Hernández (May 10, 1966 – June 7, 2011) was a Mexican-American professional boxer who competed from 1984 to 1998. Nicknamed "Chicanito" Hernandez, he went on to become a two-time super featherweight world champion, having held the WBA title from 1991 to 1995, and the WBC and lineal titles from 1997 to 1998. Additionally, he challenged for the WBO lightweight title in 1995.

== Professional career ==
"Chicanito" Hernández, a Mexican-American, enjoyed a distinguished career as a professional boxer. His debut as a paid fighter came on September 27, 1984, when he beat Dino Ramirez by a decision in four rounds in Inglewood, California. He racked up a record of 13–0 with 6 knockouts and a solid reputation as a future champion around Southern California, when he met former Julio César Chávez world title challenger Refugio Rojas on November 22, 1988. He beat Rojas, who had lasted seven rounds against Chávez, by a knockout in round six. This enabled Hernández to enter the WBA super featherweight rankings. Hernandez went on to win seven more fights, four by knockout, including one over former world title challenger Felipe Orozco, and another, in his first professional fight abroad: a three-round knockout over Leon Collins in Tokyo, Japan.

=== WBA super featherweight champion ===
Exactly two years after his win over Rojas, Hernández got his first world title try, against Daniel Londas, on November 22, 1991, in Épernay, France. Hernández knocked out Londas in nine rounds in front of Londas' hometown crowd, becoming World Junior Lightweight champion by winning the until then vacant title. In 1992, he defended his title twice, knocking out Omar Catari in six rounds and, travelling to Japan once more, defeating challengers Masuaki Takeda and Yuji Watanabe, Takeda by decision and Watanabe by knockout in six.

Defending on April 26, 1993, once again in Inglewood against former world featherweight champion Raúl Pérez, Hernández had to settle for a first round technical draw. This was the first, and so far only, world title fight in which no punches were landed. Right after the initial bell, Perez headbutted Hernández, and Perez bled profusely from an arterial vein on his forehead. The referee summoned the ring doctor, who decided the fight should be stopped as Perez required immediate surgery. In the June 28 rematch later that year, Hernández retained the world title by a knockout in round eight. Hernandez then closed the year by defeating Harold Warren by decision to once again keep his title. In 1994, Hernandez retained the title twice, including a victory over Jimmy Garcia, (who would die later after a fight with Gabriel Ruelas). By the end of 1994, Hernández was clamoring for a world title fight against crosstown rival and WBO lightweight champion Oscar De La Hoya.

After eight successful title defenses, Hernández vacated his WBA super featherweight title in order to face De La Hoya in the upcoming year. Hernández began 1995 by beating popular Mexican boxer, Jorge "Maromero" Páez, by a knockout in eight rounds in Inglewood.

=== WBO lightweight title challenge ===
On September 9, the encounter between Hernández and de la Hoya took place in Las Vegas. Hernández lost for the first time in his career, retiring from the fight at the end of the sixth round, his nose bloody: He returned to his corner, but without sitting down motioned to his team that he did not want to continue the fight. Reportedly, he had come to the fight with a nose previously injured in a sparring session. Up until the fight's end, the judges had de la Hoya holding a lead on all three scorecards. After the loss Hernández took some brief time off but by 1996 he was back inside the ring, winning two bouts that year.

=== WBC and lineal super featherweight champion ===
In 1997, he fought what almost turned into another controversial fight when he challenged Azumah Nelson in a title bout for the WBC & Lineal super featherweight titles, in Corpus Christi, Texas. Ahead on all scorecards at the end of round seven, he was hit in his throat by a Nelson punch after the bell. He needed some time to recuperate from the illegal late hit, and WBC President José Sulaiman came to his corner and informed him that if he could not continue he would be declared winner by disqualification. Hernández told Sulaiman something along the lines of I want to win it like real champions do, and he went back to the fight at the beginning of round eight. The fight ended after twelve rounds and Hernández won the Super featherweight titles by defeating Nelson with a split decision victory.

Hernández went on to defend against Anatoly Alexandrov, Carlos Gerena and Carlos Famoso Hernandez, a gym-mate and personal friend who would later become El Salvador's first world boxing champion in history.

In what would turn out to be his last fight, on October 3 of 1998 he lost his titles to Floyd Mayweather Jr. by an 8th round retirement.

=== Retirement ===
In December 1998, after he was diagnosed with a blood clot and a torn cartilage muscle, he announced his retirement with a record of 38 wins, 2 losses and 1 draw, with 17 of those wins coming by knockout. He had intended to challenge WBC lightweight champion César Bazán before the diagnosis.

== Professional boxing record ==
41 fights	38 wins	2 losses
By knockout	17	2
By decision	20	0
By disqualification	1	0
Draws	1	

No.	Result	Record	Opponent	Type	Round, time	Date	Location	Notes
41	Loss	38–2–1	Floyd Mayweather Jr.	RTD	8 (12), 3:00	Oct 3, 1998	Las Vegas Hilton, Winchester, Nevada, U.S.	Lost WBC super featherweight title
40	Win	38–1–1	Carlos Gerena	UD	12	May 16, 1998	Fantasy Springs Resort Casino, Indio, California, U.S.	Retained WBC super featherweight title
39	Win	37–1–1	Carlos Hernández	UD	12	Nov 20, 1997	Grand Olympic Auditorium, Los Angeles, California, U.S.	Retained WBC super featherweight title
38	Win	36–1–1	Anatoly Alexandrov	SD	12	Jun 14, 1997	Alamodome, San Antonio, Texas, U.S.	Retained WBC super featherweight title
37	Win	35–1–1	Azumah Nelson	SD	12	Mar 22, 1997	Memorial Coliseum, Corpus Christi, Texas, U.S.	Won WBC super featherweight title
36	Win	34–1–1	Antonio Hernández	UD	10	Sep 28, 1996	Will Rogers Coliseum, Fort Worth, Texas, U.S.	
35	Win	33–1–1	Javier Pichardo	TKO	5 (10), 2:10	May 8, 1996	Fantasy Springs Resort Casino, Indio, California, U.S.	
34	Loss	32–1–1	Oscar De La Hoya	RTD	6 (12), 3:00	Sep 9, 1995	Caesars Palace, Paradise, Nevada, U.S.	For WBO lightweight title
33	Win	32–0–1	Jorge Páez	TKO	8 (10)	Mar 31, 1995	Arrowhead Pond, Anaheim, California, U.S.	
32	Win	31–0–1	Jimmy Garcia	UD	12	Nov 12, 1994	Plaza de Toros, Mexico City, Mexico	Retained WBA super featherweight title
31	Win	30–0–1	Jorge Ramirez	TKO	8 (12), 2:35	Jan 31, 1994	Great Western Forum, Inglewood, California, U.S.	Retained WBA super featherweight title
30	Win	29–0–1	Harold Warren	UD	12	Oct 11, 1993	Great Western Forum, Inglewood, California, U.S.	Retained WBA super featherweight title
29	Win	28–0–1	Raúl Pérez	KO	8 (12), 2:11	Jun 28, 1993	Great Western Forum, Inglewood, California, U.S.	Retained WBA super featherweight title
28	Draw	27–0–1	Raúl Pérez	TD	1 (12), 0:28	Apr 26, 1993	Great Western Forum, Inglewood, California, U.S.	Retained WBA super featherweight title; TD after Pérez was cut from an accidental head clash
27	Win	27–0	Yuji Watanabe	TKO	6 (12), 0:59	Nov 20, 1992	Metropolitan Gymnasium, Tokyo, Japan	Retained WBA super featherweight title
26	Win	26–0	Masuaki Takeda	UD	12	Jul 15, 1992	Convention Center, Fukuoka, Japan	Retained WBA super featherweight title
25	Win	25–0	Omar Catarí	UD	12	Feb 24, 1992	Great Western Forum, Inglewood, California, U.S.	Retained WBA super featherweight title
24	Win	24–0	Daniel Londas	TKO	9 (12), 1:07	Nov 22, 1991	Complex Sport le COMEP, Épernay, France	Won vacant WBA super featherweight title
23	Win	23–0	Pedro Arroyo	DQ	10 (10)	Feb 11, 1991	Great Western Forum, Inglewood, California, U.S.	
22	Win	22–0	Rodolfo Gomez	KO	5 (10), 2:00	Dec 6, 1990	Great Western Forum, Inglewood, California, U.S.	
21	Win	21–0	Ben Lopez	TKO	6 (10), 2:06	Sep 22, 1990	Great Western Forum, Inglewood, California, U.S.	
20	Win	20–0	Richard Abila	KO	3 (10), 2:18	Aug 27, 1990	Great Western Forum, Inglewood, California, U.S.	
19	Win	19–0	Leon Collins	KO	3 (10)	May 10, 1990	Korakuen Hall, Tokyo, Japan	
18	Win	18–0	Felipe Orozco	UD	10	Jul 31, 1989	Great Western Forum, Inglewood, California, U.S.	
17	Win	17–0	Ed Pollard	UD	10	May 15, 1989	Great Western Forum, Inglewood, California, U.S.	
16	Win	16–0	Refugio Rojas	KO	6 (12)	Nov 22, 1988	Great Western Forum, Inglewood, California, U.S.	Won vacant California super featherweight title
15	Win	15–0	Jose Mosqueda	UD	10	Jul 25, 1988	Marriott Hotel, Irvine, California, U.S.	
14	Win	14–0	Juan Manuel Vega	TKO	9 (10)	Apr 25, 1988	Marriott Hotel, Irvine, California, U.S.	
13	Win	13–0	Kenny Wyatt	UD	10	Aug 31, 1987	Marriott Hotel, Irvine, California, U.S.	
12	Win	12–0	J L Ivey	PTS	10	Dec 12, 1986	Las Vegas, Nevada, U.S.	
11	Win	11–0	Lupe Miranda	PTS	10	Sep 12, 1986	Sahara Hotel, Winchester, Nevada, U.S.	
10	Win	10–0	Terry Baldwin	TKO	7	Jul 21, 1986	Marriott Hotel, Irvine, California, U.S.	
9	Win	9–0	Jorge Valdez	TKO	3	Apr 28, 1986	Marriott Hotel, Irvine, California, U.S.	
8	Win	8–0	Larry Villarreal	UD	6	Mar 31, 1986	Marriott Hotel, Irvine, California, U.S.	
7	Win	7–0	Terry Baldwin	KO	2 (6), 2:13	Feb 24, 1986	Marriott Hotel, Irvine, California, U.S.	
6	Win	6–0	Pablo Montano	TKO	2 (6)	Feb 17, 1986	Graham Central Station, Phoenix, Arizona, U.S.	
5	Win	5–0	Jose Maytorena	KO	1	Dec 12, 1985	Kern County Fairgrounds, Bakersfield, California, U.S.	
4	Win	4–0	Randy Archuleta	PTS	6	Oct 29, 1985	Stockton, California, U.S.	
3	Win	3–0	Dino Ramirez	UD	6	Jun 24, 1985	Marriott Hotel, Irvine, California, U.S.	
2	Win	2–0	Martin Escobar	UD	4	Nov 17, 1984	Grand Olympic Auditorium, Los Angeles, California, U.S.	
1	Win	1–0	Dino Ramirez	PTS	4	Sep 27, 1984	Great Western Forum, Inglewood, California, U.S.	

== Life after boxing ==
Hernández worked as a boxing color commentator on television, broadcasting several fights including the Floyd Mayweather Jr. and Diego Corrales fight on January 20, 2001. He was a boxing instructor at the LA Boxing Gym in Lake Forest, California until early 2011. He also assisted with regional boxing broadcasts in California.

== Illness and death ==
After retiring from boxing Hernández was diagnosed with stage four rhabdomyosarcoma of the head and neck, a very rare form of cancer, and one which Hernández' insurance would not cover for treatment. Although Hernández collected several large purses in his career, including $600,000 for his final fight against Mayweather, he was not able to afford his expensive treatments and benefits were held to assist in paying what insurance would not cover. Bob Arum, of Top Rank Promotions, who promoted Hernández, footed Hernandez' bills for chemotherapy for a number of years, until Hernandez died, also having him brought to and from the chemotherapy sessions. In mid 2009 it was reported that Hernández' cancer was in remission but in early 2010 the cancer had returned and Hernández was undergoing treatment.

On June 3, 2011, it was announced that Hernández would stop chemotherapy treatment. Hernández died from cancer on June 7, 2011, at the age of 45. Floyd Mayweather paid for Hernández's funeral expenses.

== Accolades ==
- Cauliflower Alley Club
  - Boxing Honoree (1993)

== Pay-per-view bouts ==
Date	Fight	Billing	Buys	Network
September 9, 1995	De La Hoya vs. Hernandez	The Rivals	220,000	HBO

== See also ==
- Lineal championship
- List of Mexican boxing world champions
- List of world super-featherweight boxing champions

Sporting positions
Regional boxing titles
Vacant Title last held by Greg Puente	California super featherweight champion November 22, 1988 – 1990; Vacated	Vacant Title next held by Ben Lopez
World boxing titles
Vacant Title last held by Joey Gamache	WBA super featherweight champion November 22, 1991 – April 1995; Vacated	Vacant Title next held by Choi Yong-soo
Preceded by Azumah Nelson	WBC super featherweight champion March 22, 1997 – October 3, 1998	Succeeded by Floyd Mayweather Jr.
