= Oscar De La Hoya vs. Genaro Hernández =

Boxing match

The Rivals
- Date: September 9, 1995
- Venue: Caesars Palace, Paradise, Nevada, U.S.
- Title on the line: WBO Lightweight title

Tale of the tape
Boxer	Oscar De La Hoya	Genaro Hernández
Nickname	The Golden Boy	Chicanito
Hometown	East Los Angeles, California, U.S.	Los Angeles, California, U.S.
Purse	$1,000,000	$500,000
Pre-fight record	18–0 (16 KO)	32–0–1 (16 KO)
Age	22 years, 7 months	30 years, 3 months
Height	5 ft 11 in (180 cm)	5 ft 11 in (180 cm)
Weight	135 lb (61 kg)	133 lb (60 kg)
Style	Orthodox	Orthodox
Recognition	WBO; Lightweight Champion; The Ring; No. 1 Ranked Lightweight; The Ring No. 4 ranked pound-for-pound fighter 2-division world champion	The Ring; No. 2 Ranked Super Featherweight; Former WBA Super Featherweight champion

Result
- De La Hoya wins via 6th-round corner retirement

Oscar De La Hoya vs. Genaro Hernández, billed as The Rivals, was a professional boxing match contested on September 9, 1995, for the WBO lightweight title.

== Background ==
A fight between 2-division world champion Oscar De La Hoya and former WBA super featherweight champion had been in the works for nearly three years. Hernández had first been offered $500,000 by De La Hoya promoter Bob Arum in October 1992 to face the yet-to-debut De La Hoya for Hernández's super featherweight title some point in 1993 provided Hernández first get past his challenger Raúl Pérez. But after Hernández beat Pérez convincingly in June 1993, Arum rescinded the offer and instead went on to face the less experienced Jimmi Bredahl for the WBO version of the super featherweight title the following year. Then in December 1994, Hernández was offered another chance to face De La Hoya, this time receiving a $300,000 offer to move up in weight to challenge De La Hoya for his WBO lightweight title, however, feeling insulted that this second offer was $200,000 less than the previous offer from two years prior and De La Hoya was scheduled to make an over $1,000,000 purse despite holding a then–lesser WBO title, Hernández balked at the chance. Though unable to reach a deal to face De La Hoya, Hernández would make his lightweight debut in April, defeating Jorge Páez, who was coming off a defeat to De La Hoya the previous year, by eighth-round technical knockout.

De La Hoya instead moved on to challenge IBF lightweight champion in May 1995. De La Hoya, making his debut as a pay-per-view headliner, easily beat Ruelas, knocking him out in the second round to unify the WBO and IBF lightweight titles as well as winning his first major world title. The IBF mandated De La Hoya defend their title against their number-one ranked mandatory challenger Miguel Julio, but De La Hoya opted to vacate the title at a New York City press conference in July and instead announced that he would finally meet Hernández that September in what would be his fifth defense of his WBO lightweight title. Upon the announcement of his fight with De La Hoya, Hernández, who was set to earn a career high $500,000, would officially vacate his WBA super featherweight title after the WBA insisted he meet mandatory challenger Victor Hugo Paz before facing De La Hoya.

De La Hoya and Hernández had a long-standing personal rivalry going into the fight stemming from, in large part, De La Hoya's popularity. Though both fighters were from the Los Angeles area and both had gone on to capture world titles, De La Hoya by 1995 had already become a huge star in the sport while Hernández remained largely unknown and fought in relative anonymity. Appearing as a guest on an episode of The Tonight Show with Jay Leno, De La Hoya notably called out Hernández, referring to him as "Generic" Hernández and denouncing him as a "boring fighter."

== The Fight ==
Hernández started the fight solidly, winning the first round on 2 of the three judge's scorecards, but De La Hoya dominated the majority of the remainder of the fight, landing nearly half of his punches compared to Hernández, who only was able to connect with 23% of his punches and only took one round apiece on two scorecards after the first round. De La Hoya took a more tactical approach, bobbing and weaving constantly to avoid Hernández's punches but still battering him whenever there was an opening. In the sixth round, De La Hoya broke Hernández's nose early in the round after connecting with a right hook followed by a left directly Hernández's nose, which then began to bleed. Though Hernández finished the round, he had trouble breathing in his corner between rounds and claimed to be in severe pain due to his injury, first informing his brother and trainer and then referee Richard Steele that he no longer wanted to continue, after which the fight was stopped, giving De La Hoya the victory via corner retirement.

== Aftermath ==
Hernández decision not to continue the fight was likened to Roberto Durán having quit in his second fight with Sugar Ray Leonard. However, Hernández maintained that he did so for his safety stating after the fight "I feel bad I let down a lot of people, but I had to give up. There’s been a lot of serious injuries in boxing lately, and I’ve got a daughter and a beautiful wife. I don’t need to end up like those other fighters. It’s better to say no mas than not to say another word." Hernández's physician Adam Karns seconded Hernandez stating "It’s such severe pain, no one could have continued." Hernández had first suffered a nose injury sparring with Shane Mosley weeks before the fight.

== Fight card ==
Confirmed bouts:

Weight Class	Weight		vs.		Method	Round	Notes
Lightweight	135 lbs.	Oscar De La Hoya (c)	def.	Genaro Hernández	RTD	6/12	^{note 1}
Light Heavyweight	175 lbs.	James Toney (c)	def.	Ernest Mateen	DQ	5/12	^{note 2}
Featherweight	126 lbs.	Kevin Kelley	vs.	Clarence Adams	D	12/12	^{note 3}
Super Bantamweight	122 lbs.	Erik Morales (c)	def.	Alberto Martínez	TKO	4/12	^{note 4}
Super Flyweight	115 lbs.	Johnny Tapia	def.	Jesse Miranda	UD	10/10

^Note 1 For WBO Lightweight title
^Note 2 For WBU Light Heavyweight title
^Note 3 For WBU Featherweight title
^Note 4 For Mexico and NABF Super Bantamweight titles

== Broadcasting ==
Country	Broadcaster
Mexico	Televisa
United Kingdom	BBC
United States	HBO

Preceded by vs. Rafael Ruelas	Oscar De La Hoya's bouts 9 September 1995	Succeeded by vs. Jesse James Leija
Preceded by vs. Jorge Páez	Genaro Hernández's bouts 9 September 1995	Succeeded by vs. Javier Pichardo
