= Carlos Hernández (boxer) =

American-Salvadoran boxing champion

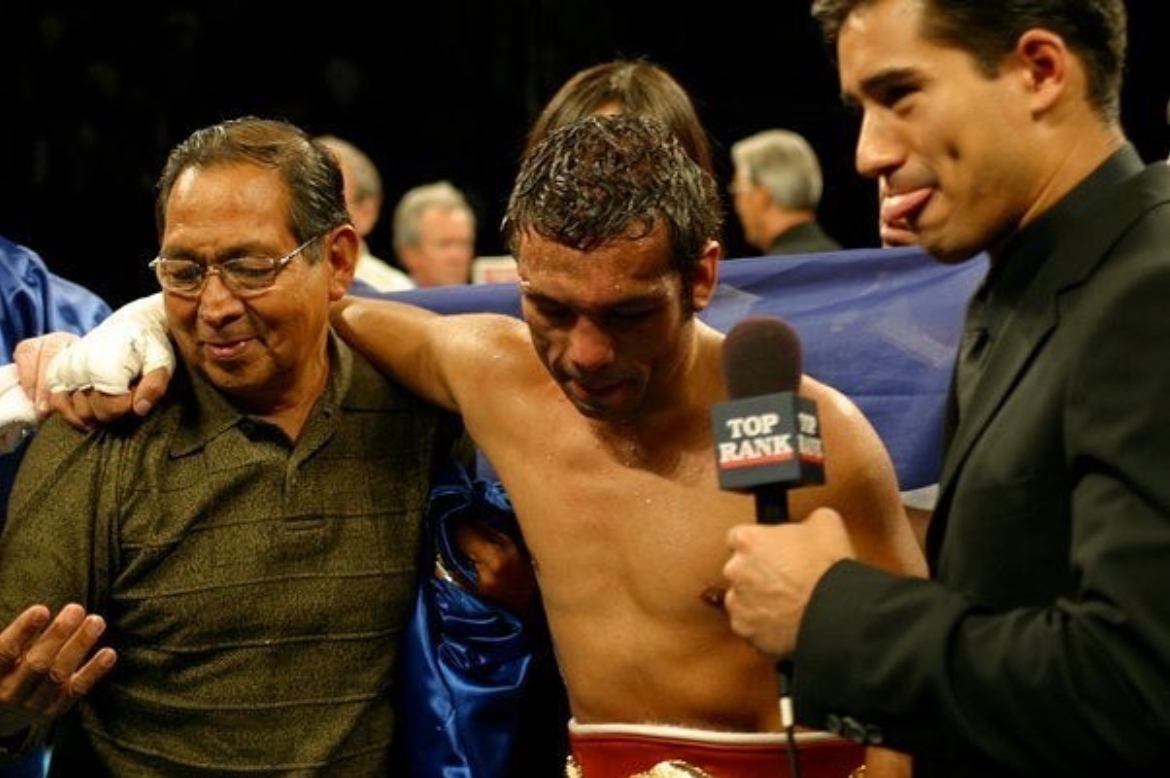
- Hernandez alongside his father and Mario Lopez at a match held at Crypto.com Arena, Los Angeles.

Personal information
- Nickname: El Famoso
- Born: Carlos Hernández; January 23, 1971 (age 55) Los Angeles, California, U.S.
- Weight: Super featherweight

Boxing career

Boxing record
- Total fights: 52
- Wins: 43
- Win by KO: 24
- Losses: 8
- Draws: 1

Carlos Hernández (born January 23, 1971, in Los Angeles, California) is a retired Salvadoran American boxer. He made boxing history by becoming the IBF super featherweight champion by beating David Santos. On October 4, 2003, he retained the title against former IBF lightweight champion Steve Forbes, with an eleventh-round technical decision.

Hernandez has a record of 43 wins, 8 losses and 1 draw with 24 knockouts. In previous world title tries, he had lost a decision in 12 to Genaro Hernandez and to Floyd Mayweather Jr.

Hernandez lost to Jesús Chávez on May 28, 2005, in a fight that, had he won, would have led him to another world title fight.

On October 8, 2005, he suffered a controversial loss against Bobby Pacquiao, the brother of Manny Pacquiao from the Philippines in a 10-round split decision. Pacquiao managed to drop Hernandez in the 2nd round, but Hernandez fought back consistently starting round 3 to close the fight, or even take the points by 10th. To the eyes of the fans and commentators, it should have gone the other way in favor of Carlos Hernandez, but was still a very close fight to call.

On September 28, 2006, Hernandez announced his retirement after losing by unanimous decision to Kevin Kelley; after an even first 3 rounds, he was knocked down in the 4th round, and unable to regain momentum from then on.

On retirement, Hernandez had this to say: "My time...in this career...if I'm going to get knocked down back-to-back it's time to call it a career. I don't want to get hurt in this business. I have beautiful children....I feel bad that I couldn't win, but you know, I think that everyone who saw me knows I won't get knocked out or I won't go down, I'll keep coming, I'm relentless, I persevere. That's my motto, 'perseverance pays off.' I think I'll just persevere in another career. I don't know what that may be, but I'm going to keep succeeding in life."

In his last bout, Hernandez lost a decision in a brutal war against former Olympian Vicente Escobedo.

== Professional boxing record ==
| 52 fights | 43 wins | 8 losses |
|---|---|---|
| By knockout | 24 | 0 |
| By decision | 18 | 8 |
| By disqualification | 1 | 0 |
| Draws | 1 | |

| No. | Result | Record | Opponent | Type | Round, time | Date | Location | Notes |
|---|---|---|---|---|---|---|---|---|
| 52 | Loss | 43–8–1 | Vicente Escobedo | UD | 10 | Apr 4, 2009 | Frank Erwin Center, Austin, Texas, U.S. | |
| 51 | Win | 43–7–1 | Hector Alatorre | SD | 10 | Aug 15, 2008 | Aragon Ballroom, Chicago, Illinois, U.S. | |
| 50 | Loss | 42–7–1 | Kevin Kelley | UD | 10 | Sep 28, 2006 | Municipal Auditorium, San Antonio, Texas, U.S. | |
| 49 | Win | 42–6–1 | Sean Plessis | UD | 10 | Jul 14, 2006 | Charro Ranch, San Antonio, Texas, U.S. | |
| 48 | Loss | 41–6–1 | Bobby Pacquiao | SD | 10 | Oct 8, 2005 | Thomas & Mack Center, Paradise, Nevada, U.S. | |
| 47 | Loss | 41–5–1 | Jesús Chávez | SD | 12 | May 28, 2005 | Staples Center, Los Angeles, California, U.S. | |
| 46 | Win | 41–4–1 | Juan Carlos Ramírez | SD | 10 | Dec 11, 2004 | Mandalay Bay, Paradise, Nevada, U.S. | |
| 45 | Loss | 40–4–1 | Erik Morales | UD | 12 | Jul 31, 2004 | MGM Grand Garden Arena, Paradise, Nevada, U.S. | Lost IBF super featherweight title; For WBC super featherweight title |
| 44 | Win | 40–3–1 | Steve Forbes | TD | 10 (12), 3:00 | Oct 4, 2003 | Staples Center, Los Angeles, California, U.S. | Retained IBF super featherweight title; Unanimous TD: Hernández cut from an accidental headbutt |
| 43 | Win | 39–3–1 | Moisés Pedroza | TKO | 2 (10), 1:36 | May 30, 2003 | Lucky Eagle Casino, Eagle Pass, Texas, U.S. | |
| 42 | Win | 38–3–1 | David Santos | TD | 8 (12), 2:52 | Feb 1, 2003 | Mandalay Bay, Paradise, Nevada, U.S. | Won vacant IBF super featherweight title; Unanimous TD: Santos cut from an accidental headbutt |
| 41 | Win | 37–3–1 | Mark Burse | UD | 10 | Jun 14, 2002 | Civic Center, Beaumont, Texas, U.S. | |
| 40 | Win | 36–3–1 | Douglas Villareal | KO | 1 (10), 2:30 | Mar 22, 2002 | Frank Erwin Center, Austin, Texas, U.S. | |
| 39 | Win | 35–3–1 | Justin Juuko | UD | 10 | Nov 25, 2001 | Stateline Casino, Wendover, Utah, U.S. | |
| 38 | Win | 34–3–1 | Juan Ángel Macías | TKO | 8 (12), 3:00 | Sep 15, 2001 | International Fair Amphitheatre, San Salvador, El Salvador | Won inaugural WBC Latino super featherweight tirle |
| 37 | Loss | 33–3–1 | Floyd Mayweather Jr. | UD | 12 | May 26, 2001 | Van Andel Arena, Grand Rapids, Michigan, U.S. | For WBC super featherweight title |
| 36 | Win | 33–2–1 | Sandro Marcos | TKO | 2 (10), 2:42 | Feb 4, 2001 | Lucky Star Casino, Concho, Oklahoma, U.S. | |
| 35 | Win | 32–2–1 | Reggie Sanders | KO | 5 (10), 2:38 | Dec 18, 2000 | Los Angeles, California, U.S. | |
| 34 | Win | 31–2–1 | Ángel Aldama | TKO | 4 (8) | Nov 12, 2000 | Los Caporales Regency Hotel, Denver, Colorado, U.S. | |
| 33 | Win | 30–2–1 | Tony Duran | TKO | 6 (8), 1:07 | May 6, 2000 | Pan American Center, Las Cruces, New Mexico, U.S. | |
| 32 | Win | 29–2–1 | Miguel Alejandro Jiménez | UD | 10 | Nov 5, 1999 | Steven's Steakhouse, Commerce, California, U.S. | |
| 31 | Win | 28–2–1 | Javier Lucas | TKO | 6 | Apr 28, 1999 | Quiet Cannon, Montebello, California, U.S. | |
| 30 | Win | 27–2–1 | Ernesto Martínez | TKO | 4 (8), 3:00 | Jan 9, 1999 | New Frontier Hotel, Paradise, Nevada, U.S. | |
| 29 | Win | 26–2–1 | Roberto Ávila | SD | 10 | Apr 4, 1998 | San Salvador, San Salvador Department, El Salvador | |
| 28 | Loss | 25–2–1 | Genaro Hernández | UD | 12 | Nov 20, 1997 | Olympic Auditorium, Los Angeles, California, U.S. | For WBC super featherweight title |
| 27 | Win | 25–1–1 | José Luis Montes | KO | 2 (10), 1:39 | Jun 9, 1997 | Arrowhead Pond, Anaheim, California, U.S. | |
| 26 | Win | 24–1–1 | Bernard Harris | KO | 8, 2:26 | Apr 7, 1997 | Arrowhead Pond, Anaheim, California, U.S. | |
| 25 | Win | 23–1–1 | Gregorio Vargas | MD | 10 | Jan 13, 1997 | Great Western Forum, Inglewood, California, U.S. | |
| 24 | Win | 22–1–1 | Isagani Pumar | TKO | 10 (12), 0:06 | Jul 10, 1996 | Beverly Hilton, Beverly Hills, California, U.S. | |
| 23 | Loss | 21–1–1 | Aarón Zárate | SD | 10 | Sep 30, 1995 | Caesars Tahoe, Stateline, Nevada, U.S. | |
| 22 | Win | 21–0–1 | Ángel Aldama | UD | 10 | May 19, 1995 | Buffalo Bill's Star Arena, Primm, Nevada, U.S. | |
| 21 | Win | 20–0–1 | Ramón Sánchez | KO | 4 | Apr 10, 1995 | Great Western Forum, Inglewood, California, U.S. | |
| 20 | Win | 19–0–1 | Fernando Rosas | TKO | 4 (8), 2:34 | Oct 24, 1994 | Great Western Forum, Inglewood, California, U.S. | |
| 19 | Win | 18–0–1 | Carlos Marquez | KO | 3 (8), 2:43 | Sep 10, 1994 | Caesars Tahoe, Stateline, Nevada, U.S | |
| 18 | Win | 17–0–1 | Tomás Valdez | KO | 2 (10) | Jun 11, 1994 | Great Western Forum, Inglewood, California, U.S. | |
| 17 | Win | 16–0–1 | Narciso Valenzuela Romo | UD | 10 | Apr 25, 1994 | Great Western Forum, Inglewood, California, U.S. | |
| 16 | Win | 15–0–1 | Paris Alexander | KO | 7 (10), 2:06 | Mar 24, 1994 | Marriott Hotel, Irvine, California, U.S. | |
| 15 | Win | 14–0–1 | Javier Márquez | KO | 5 | Mar 1, 1994 | Great Western Forum, Inglewood, California, U.S. | |
| 14 | Win | 13–0–1 | Hector Javier Monjardin | UD | 8 | Oct 11, 1993 | Great Western Forum, Inglewood, California, U.S. | |
| 13 | Win | 12–0–1 | Greg Puente | UD | 6 | Jun 28, 1993 | Great Western Forum, Inglewood, California, U.S. | |
| 12 | Win | 11–0–1 | Rafael Vargas | KO | 5 (6) | Apr 26, 1993 | Great Western Forum, Inglewood, California, U.S. | |
| 11 | Win | 10–0–1 | Jorge Ojeda | KO | 5 (6) | Apr 17, 1993 | ARCO Arena, Sacramento, California, U.S. | |
| 10 | Win | 9–0–1 | Sergio Baez | DQ | 4 (6) | Mar 25, 1993 | Marriott Hotel, Irvine, California, U.S. | |
| 9 | Win | 8–0–1 | Ramón Morales | UD | 5 | Nov 6, 1992 | Great Western Forum, Inglewood, California, U.S. | |
| 8 | Win | 7–0–1 | Larry Loy | UD | 6 | Oct 30, 1992 | San Bernardino, California, U.S. | |
| 7 | Win | 6–0–1 | Edgar Soto | KO | 2 (4) | Aug 10, 1992 | Great Western Forum, Inglewood, California, U.S. | |
| 6 | Win | 5–0–1 | Jorge Ojeda | KO | 2 (4) | Jul 24, 1992 | San Bernardino, California, U.S. | |
| 5 | Win | 4–0–1 | Mike Dallas | KO | 2 (4) | Jul 13, 1992 | Great Western Forum, Inglewood, California, U.S. | |
| 4 | Win | 3–0–1 | Tony Olivas | KO | 1 (4) | Jun 25, 1992 | Marriott Hotel, Irvine, California, U.S. | |
| 3 | Win | 2–0–1 | Bret Boone | UD | 4 | May 27, 1992 | Marriott Hotel, Irvine, California, U.S. | |
| 2 | Win | 1–0–1 | Francisco Salinas | UD | 4 | Apr 23, 1992 | Marriott Hotel, Irvine, California, U.S. | |
| 1 | Draw | 0–0–1 | Victor Martinez | PTS | 4 | Jan 23, 1992 | Marriott Hotel, Irvine, California, U.S. | |

== See also ==
- More Than Famous

Sporting positions
World boxing titles
| Vacant Title last held by Steve Forbes | IBF Super Featherweight Champion; 1 February 2003 – 31 July 2004 | Succeeded by Erik Morales |
