= Jesús Chávez =

Mexican boxer (born 1972)

Personal information
- Nickname: El Matador ("The Matador")
- Born: Jesús Gabriel Sandoval Chávez; November 12, 1972 (age 53) Delicias, Chihuahua, Mexico
- Height: 5 ft 5 in (165 cm)
- Weight: Featherweight; Super featherweight; Lightweight

Boxing career
- Reach: 66 in (168 cm)
- Stance: Orthodox

Boxing record
- Total fights: 52
- Wins: 44
- Win by KO: 30
- Losses: 8

Jesús Gabriel Sandoval Chávez (/ˈtʃævɛz/; born November 12, 1972) is a Mexican former professional boxer who competed from 1994 to 2010. He is a two-weight world champion, having held the World Boxing Council (WBC) super featherweight title from 2003 to 2004, and the International Boxing Federation (IBF) lightweight title from 2005 to 2007.

== Early life ==
Chávez was born in Delicias, Chihuahua, Mexico, and raised in Chicago, Illinois. He became a legal U.S. resident as a child, but at age 16 he was convicted of being an accessory to armed robbery, spent four years in prison, and was subsequently deported back to Mexico. Nevertheless, he struggled to regain American citizenship and work his way up in boxing ranks.

== Professional career ==
Chávez's first title opportunity came against WBC Super Featherweight champion Floyd Mayweather Jr. where he retired in the 9th round after an entertaining bout. He rebounded to win Mayweather's vacated WBC title on a fight for the title against 43-1 world champion Sirimongkol Eaimthuam by a twelve-round unanimous decision at the Austin Convention Center in his hometown Austin, Texas on August 15, 2003, but lost it on his first defense, to the then two-time champion Erik Morales. In another exciting fight, Chávez rocked Morales early in the first round. Morales recovered and knocked Chávez down twice in the 2nd round, but Chávez came back and fought hard for the rest of the fight, despite having a torn rotator cuff and torn ACL. Morales won a close decision, but Chávez gained further respect for his effort. In his next fight, he took on former IBF Champion Carlos Hernández, who in turn had also lost his own title to Morales. In an exciting 12-round war, Chávez pulled out a close decision.

=== IBF lightweight champion and death of Leavander Johnson ===
He then moved up to the Lightweight division to take on IBF champion Leavander Johnson. In an unfortunate bout, Chávez out-hustled Johnson throughout the entire fight, beating him severely for the entire fight until the referee finally stepped in and ended it. Johnson died several days later after he went into a coma. Despite being implicated in the tragedy, Johnson's family encouraged Chávez to keep fighting.

In 2007, Chávez lost his IBF title to Julio Díaz.

On September 6, 2008, Jesús "El Matador" Chávez, (44–4 with 31 Win by TKO) knocked out visiting Andres Ledesma, of Colombia, 42 seconds into the 9th round of their lightweight bout, at the Toyota Center, in Houston, Texas. Chávez, of Austin, also floored Ledesma in the 7th round.

On April 4, 2009, Chávez was defeated by Michael Katsidis via 8th-round TKO. He is trained by Richard Lord.

Chávez is the subject of the 2006 non-fiction book by Adam Pitluk titled Standing Eight.

== Personal life ==
His struggle to attain legal U.S. residence and work his way up the boxing ranks was documented in the film "Split Decision". His life story was also documented in the book "Standing Eight: The Inspiring Story of Jesus El Matador Chavez". In 2004, Chávez married US National Guard intelligence officer Aunisa Stroklund before she was deployed to the war in Iraq.

== Professional boxing record ==
52 fights	44 wins	8 losses
By knockout	30	4
By decision	14	4

No.	Result	Record	Opponent	Type	Round, time	Date	Location	Notes
52	Loss	44–8	Jorge Linares	RTD	4 (10), 3:00	Oct 24, 2010	Ryōgoku Kokugikan, Tokyo, Japan	
51	Loss	44–7	Humberto Soto	UD	10	Dec 19, 2009	Arena ITSON, Ciudad Obregón, Mexico	
50	Loss	44–6	David Díaz	MD	10	Sep 26, 2009	UIC Pavilion, Chicago, Illinois, U.S.	
49	Loss	44–5	Michael Katsidis	RTD	8 (10), 0:10	Apr 4, 2009	Frank Erwin Center, Austin, Texas, U.S.	
48	Win	44–4	Andrés Ledesma	TKO	9 (10), 0:42	Sep 6, 2008	Toyota Center, Houston, Texas, U.S.	
47	Win	43–4	Daniel Jiménez	UD	10	Apr 4, 2008	Morongo Casino Resort & Spa, Cabazon, California, U.S.	
46	Loss	42–4	Julio Díaz	KO	3 (12), 0:22	Feb 3, 2007	Silver Spurs Arena, Kissimmee, Florida, U.S.	Lost IBF lightweight title
45	Win	42–3	Leavander Johnson	TKO	11 (12), 0:38	Sep 17, 2005	MGM Grand Garden Arena, Paradise, Nevada, U.S.	Won IBF lightweight title
44	Win	41–3	Carlos Hernández	SD	12	May 28, 2005	Staples Center, Los Angeles, California, U.S.	
43	Loss	40–3	Érik Morales	UD	12	Feb 28, 2004	MGM Grand Garden Arena, Paradise, Nevada, U.S.	Lost WBC super featherweight title
42	Win	40–2	Sirimongkol Singwancha	UD	12	Aug 15, 2003	Convention Center, Austin, Texas, U.S.	Won WBC super featherweight title
41	Win	39–2	Carlos Gerena	TKO	6 (12), 2:10	Mar 22, 2003	Mandalay Bay Events Center, Paradise, Nevada, U.S.	
40	Win	38–2	Johnny Walker	TKO	6 (10), 2:03	Nov 15, 2002	Entertainment Center, Laredo, Texas, U.S.	
39	Win	37–2	Julio Sánchez León	TKO	7 (10), 2:34	Jun 28, 2002	Freeman Coliseum, San Antonio, Texas, U.S.	
38	Win	36–2	Gerardo Zayas	KO	3 (10), 2:26	Mar 22, 2002	Frank Erwin Center, Austin, Texas, U.S.	
37	Loss	35–2	Floyd Mayweather Jr.	RTD	9 (12), 3:00	Nov 10, 2001	Bill Graham Civic Auditorium, San Francisco, California, U.S.	For WBC super featherweight title
36	Win	35–1	Juan José Arias	UD	12	May 26, 2001	Van Andel Arena, Grand Rapids, Michigan, U.S.	Retained NABF super featherweight title
35	Win	34–1	Tom Johnson	TKO	8 (12), 0:10	Feb 23, 2001	Frank Erwin Center, Austin, Texas, U.S.	Won vacant NABF super featherweight title
34	Win	33–1	Benito Rodríguez	TKO	6 (10), 0:10	Jan 14, 2001	Deandas Tejano Saloon, Houston, Texas, U.S.	
33	Win	32–1	Miguel Andrade	KO	2	Aug 4, 2000	Ensenada, Mexico	
32	Win	31–1	Russell Mosley	TKO	2	Jun 23, 2000	Poliforum Zamna, Mérida, Mexico	
31	Win	30–1	Darryl Pinckney	TKO	4 (12)	Mar 3, 2000	Chihuahua, Mexico	Retained NABF super featherweight title
30	Win	29–1	Adarryl Johnson	TKO	5 (12), 1:12	Nov 15, 1999	La Boom Discoteque, Mexico City, Mexico	Retained NABF super featherweight title
29	Win	28–1	Armando Bósquez	TKO	4 (12)	Aug 27, 1999	Gimnasio Municipal "Jose Neri Santos", Ciudad Juárez, Mexico	Won vacant NABF super featherweight title
28	Win	27–1	Bruno Rabanales	TKO	4	Jul 31, 1999	Ciudad Juárez, Mexico	
27	Win	26–1	Julio Álvarez	UD	12	May 22, 1999	Mexico City, Mexico	Won vacant NABF super featherweight title
26	Win	25–1	Rudolfo Lunsford	TKO	4 (12)	Oct 2, 1998	Hala Ludowa, Wrocław, Poland	Retained NABF super featherweight title
25	Win	24–1	Eloy Ortega	TKO	2	Aug 15, 1998	Mexico City, Mexico	
24	Win	23–1	Moisés Rodríguez	TKO	3	Apr 18, 1998	Mexico City, Mexico	
23	Win	22–1	Troy Dorsey	RTD	7 (12), 3:00	Oct 4, 1997	Circus Maximus Showroom, Atlantic City, New Jersey, U.S.	Retained NABF super featherweight title
22	Win	21–1	Wilfredo Negrón	TKO	5 (12), 0:10	Aug 19, 1997	Convention Center, Austin, Texas, U.S.	Retained NABF super featherweight title
21	Win	20–1	John Brown	UD	12	Jun 10, 1997	Luedecke Arena, Austin, Texas, U.S.	Retained NABF super featherweight title
20	Win	19–1	Louie Espinoza	TD	8 (12)	May 5, 1997	Broadway by the Bay Theater, Atlantic City, New Jersey, U.S.	Retained NABF super featherweight title; Unanimous TD after Espinoza was cut from an accidental head clash
19	Win	18–1	Louie Leija	TKO	6 (12), 2:26	Mar 3, 1997	Austin, Texas, U.S.	Won vacant NABF super featherweight title
18	Win	17–1	Miguel Tepanacatl	KO	2 (10), 0:45	Nov 8, 1996	Austin, Texas, U.S.	
17	Win	16–1	Javier Jáuregui	UD	12	Aug 9, 1996	Austin, Texas, U.S.	Won vacant NABF featherweight title
16	Win	15–1	Felipe Castillo	UD	10	May 17, 1996	Austin, Texas, U.S.	
15	Win	14–1	Cedric Mingo	UD	12	Mar 31, 1996	Jacob Brown Auditorium, Brownsville, Texas, U.S.	Won vacant WBC Continental Americas featherweight title
14	Win	13–1	Eldon Sneed	TKO	2 (8), 1:38	Feb 22, 1996	Austin, Texas, U.S.	
13	Win	12–1	Roberto Ávila	PTS	10	Dec 6, 1995	Fort Worth, Texas, U.S.	
12	Win	11–1	Gilbert Salinas	UD	8	Nov 2, 1995	Music Hall, Austin, Texas, U.S.	
11	Win	10–1	Lupe Rodríguez	KO	6 (10), 1:25	Sep 21, 1995	International Convention Center, Brownsville, Texas, U.S.	
10	Win	9–1	Héctor Vicencio	TKO	6 (10)	Aug 25, 1995	Music Hall, Austin, Texas, U.S.	
9	Win	8–1	Arturo Rangel	KO	2	Jul 29, 1995	Freeman Coliseum, San Antonio, Texas, U.S.	
8	Win	7–1	Manuel Mendez	RTD	2 (6), 3:00	Jul 13, 1995	International Convention Center, Brownsville, Texas, U.S.	
7	Win	6–1	Emanuel Augustus	TKO	7	Jun 20, 1995	Will Rogers Coliseum, Fort Worth, Texas, U.S.	
6	Win	5–1	Tony Duran	TKO	3	May 3, 1995	Dallas, Texas, U.S.	
5	Loss	4–1	Carlos Gerena	SD	8	Jan 7, 1995	Freeman Coliseum, San Antonio, Texas, U.S.	
4	Win	4–0	César Armando Martínez	TKO	4 (8)	Oct 15, 1994	West Martin Field, Laredo, Texas, U.S.	
3	Win	3–0	Jamie Cooper	TKO	4	Oct 13, 1994	Expo Hall, Shreveport, Louisiana, U.S.	
2	Win	2–0	Rudy Hernandez	UD	4	Aug 19, 1994	Municipal Stadium, San Antonio, Texas, U.S.	
1	Win	1–0	Lewis Wood	UD	4	Aug 5, 1994	Houston, Texas, U.S.	

== Titles in boxing ==
=== Major world titles ===
- WBC super featherweight champion (130 lbs)
- IBF lightweight champion (135 lbs)

=== Regional/International titles ===
- WBC Continental Americas featherweight champion (126 lbs)
- NABF featherweight champion (126 lbs)
- NABF super featherweight champion (130 lbs) (4x)

Sporting positions
Regional boxing titles
Vacant Title last held by Eduardo Montes	WBC Continental Americas featherweight champion March 31, 1996 – August 1996; Vacated	Vacant Title next held by Derrick Gainer
Vacant Title last held by Robert Garcia	NABF featherweight champion August 9, 1996 – November 1996; Vacated	Vacant Title next held by Jose Luis Noyola
Vacant Title last held by Robert Garcia	NABF super featherweight champion March 3, 1997 – January 1999; Vacated	Vacant Title next held by Joel Casamayor
Vacant Title last held by Joel Casamayor	NABF super featherweight champion May 22, 1999 – July 1999; Vacated	Vacant Title next held by David Santos
Vacant Title last held by David Santos	NABF super featherweight champion August 27, 1999 – March 2000; Vacated	Vacant Title next held by Robbie Peden
Vacant Title last held by Justin Juuko	NABF super featherweight champion February 23, 2001 – November 2001; Vacated	Vacant Title next held by Daniel Alicea
World boxing titles
Preceded by Sirimongkol Singwangcha	WBC super featherweight champion August 15, 2003 – February 28, 2004	Succeeded by Érik Morales
Preceded by Leavander Johnson	IBF lightweight champion September 17, 2005 – February 3, 2007	Succeeded by Julio Díaz
