= Carlos Gerena =

Puerto Rican boxer (1971–2026)

Personal information
- Nickname: El Topo
- Nationality: Puerto Rican
- Born: January 12, 1971 Bayamón, Puerto Rico
- Died: October 26, 2026 (aged 55) Bayamón, Puerto Rico
- Height: 5 ft 9 in (1.75 m)
- Weight: Super featherweight

Boxing career
- Stance: Orthodox

Boxing record
- Total fights: 44
- Wins: 38
- Win by KO: 30
- Losses: 6
Medal record
Representing Puerto Rico
Pan American Games
| Silver medal – second place | 1991 Havana | Bantamweight |

Carlos Gerena Allende (January 12, 1971 – October 26, 2026) was a Puerto Rican professional boxer who competed from 1993 to 2003, twice challenging for the WBC super featherweight title in 1998 and 1999. As an amateur, he won a silver medal at the 1991 Pan American Games.

== Amateur career ==
- 1990 Competed as a Flyweight at 1990 Goodwill Games in Seattle
  - Lost to Dzhambulat Mutayev (Soviet Union) PTS
- 1991 Bantamweight Silver Medalist at Pan-American Games in Havana
  - Defeated Catalino Becerra (Panama) TKO 2
  - Defeated Javier Calderon (Mexico) PTS
  - Lost to Enrique Carrion (Cuba) points
- 1992 Competed as a Featherweight at the Olympic Games in Barcelona
  - Defeated Narendar Singh (India) PTS
  - Lost to Hocine Soltani (Algeria) PTS

== Professional career ==
Gerena's most notable accomplishment was defeating Jesús Chávez of Mexico by split decision on January 7, 1995—early in both of their careers. Chávez avenged the loss on March 22, 2003 with a TKO victory in round 6. Gerena also fought against notable world champions Genaro Hernandez and Floyd Mayweather Jr.

Gerena won minor titles such as the WBA Latin, WBA Fedelatin, and WBC Continental Americas super featherweight titles throughout his career. His record was 38-6 (30 KOs). Before his professional career he represented his native country at the 1992 Summer Olympics in Barcelona, Spain.

== Death ==
Gerena was struck and killed by a hit-and-run driver, while crossing Puerto Rico Highway 2 (PR-2) in Bayamón, on the morning of October 26, 2026. He was 55.

== See also ==
- Puerto Rican-Mexican boxing rivalry
