= Damned to Eternity =

2007 non-fiction crime book by Adam Pitluk

- Author: Adam Pitluk
- Subjects: James Scott
- Genres: Non-fiction, crime
- Publisher: Da Capo Press
- ISBN: 978-0-306-81527-0

Damned to Eternity is a 2007 book about the criminal conviction of James Scott, who was found guilty of damaging a levee in 1993, causing flooding.

It was written by journalist and academic Adam Pitluk.

== Publication ==
Damned to Eternity was written by Adam Pitluk who was previously a Time magazine reporter and who also wrote Standing Eight: The Inspiring Story of Jesus “El Matador” Chavez, Who Became Lightweight Champion of the World, (2006).

The book was published by Da Capo Press in 2007.

== Synopsis ==
The book is about James Scott, who was convicted of damaging a levee on the Mississippi River at West Quincy, Missouri exacerbating the Great Flood of 1993. Scott is described as a man with an alcohol problem who worked at Burger King. The book documents his mental illness and childhood school arson. As an adult, Scott volunteered to respond to the flooding but often neglected his duties. After he reported some damage to a levee, Scott was accused of causing the damage, before being found guilty.

The book hints at a possible miscarriage of justice but does not strongly advocate for Scott's guilt or innocence.

== Critical reception and aftermath ==
Noting that the book neither attempts to convince readers of Scott's guilt or innocence, Kirkus Reviews described it as "comprehensive but halfhearted." Publishers Weekly commended the author for doing a "superb job." The Star Tribune described the book as compelling.

In 2022, Pitluk contributed to the Vice News documentary Overlooked, which followed up on the issues featured in the book.
