= Robert Garcia (American boxer) =

American boxer and boxing trainer (born 1975)

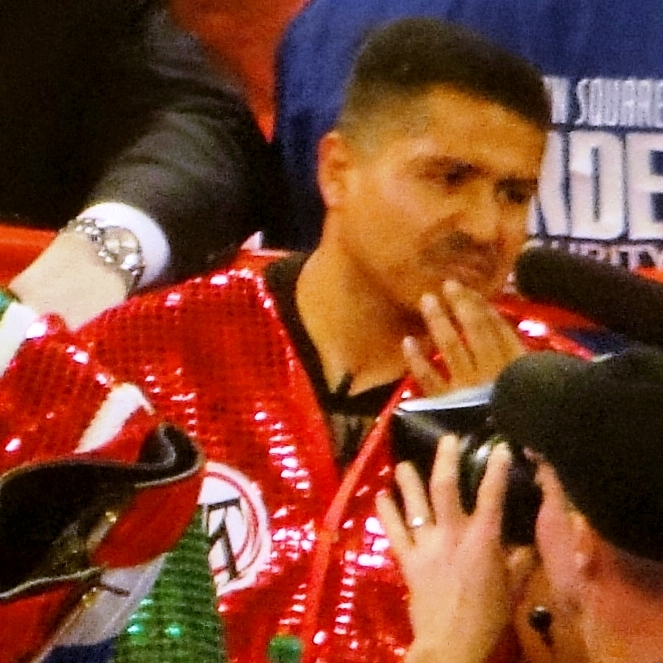
- Garcia in 2011

Personal information
- Nickname: Grandpa
- Born: Roberto Garcia Cortez; January 29, 1975 (age 51) San Pedro, Los Angeles, California, U.S.
- Height: 5 ft 7 1/2 in (171 cm)
- Weight: Featherweight; Super featherweight

Boxing career
- Reach: 67 in (170 cm)
- Stance: Orthodox

Boxing record
- Total fights: 37
- Wins: 34
- Win by KO: 25
- Losses: 3

Roberto Garcia Cortez (born January 29, 1975) is an American former professional boxer who competed from 1992 to 2001, and held the IBF junior lightweight title from 1998 to 1999. He has since worked as a boxing trainer, and was named Trainer of the Year by The Ring magazine in 2011 and 2024, and by the Boxing Writers Association of America in 2012, 2024, and 2025. He is the older brother of professional boxer Mikey Garcia, who was a world champion in four weight classes.

== Early life ==
Born in San Pedro, Los Angeles, Garcia grew up and still resides in Oxnard, California, and was trained by his father Eduardo Garcia at the La Colonia Youth Boxing Club. Garcia said that he has been in Oxnard, California, since he was two years old. He considers himself to be Mexican, and has said that his father and mother are both of Mexican descent. He said that his parents were illegal immigrants until the eighties. He said that he grew up speaking Spanish, and that he learned to speak English when he went to school.

== Amateur career ==
Robert Garcia had an extensive amateur career, but rumors about him fighting De La Hoya are unfounded. Although, Garcia has acknowledged sparring and training with the Hall of Famer.

Even so, his professional and amateur career are internationally recognized.

== Professional career ==
Known as "Grandpa", Garcia won his pro debut against Tsutomu Hitono at the International Center in Fukuoka, Japan. He accumulated a record of 20–0, which included a win against future champion Derrick Gainer, before challenging for his first regional title.

=== NABF super featherweight champion ===
In 1995 he took down the previously unbeaten American Julian Wheeler to win his first belt, the NABF Super Featherweight Championship. He successfully defended his championship just three months later against Francisco Segura.

=== NABF featherweight champion ===
At the Miami Arena, Garcia moved down to Featherweight and beat Darryl Pinckney to win the NABF Featherweight Championship.

=== IBF super featherweight champion ===
On March 13, 1998 a then undefeated Garcia (29–0) captured the vacant IBF Super Featherweight Championship with a unanimous decision win over Harold Warren. In his first title defense he knocked out Cuban Ramon Ledon at the Trump Taj Mahal, Atlantic City, New Jersey.

His next fight was against two-time World Champion, Puerto Rico's John John Molina. Garcia defeated Molina over twelve rounds; that fight card also featured Mike Tyson, Zab Judah, and Fres Oquendo. He lost the belt in an upset to rising undefeated phenom Diego Corrales. After a win over title contender Sandro Marcos he moved back up in the world rankings.

=== WBA super featherweight title challenge and retirement ===
In January 2001, he earned a shot at the undefeated WBA Super Featherweight champion Joel Casamayor. Casamayor won the fight and Garcia retired shortly after beating veteran John Trigg by knockout.

== Training career ==
Garcia worked as a trainer at La Colonia Gym in Oxnard, California. Notable fighters who have trained under Garcia include Nonito Donaire and Tony Ferguson. Most recently he opened his own boxing gym named Robert Garcia Boxing Academy in Oxnard, California. He is a three-time Boxing Writers Association of America Trainer of the Year (2012, 2024, 2025) and a two-time Ring magazine Trainer of the Year (2011, 2024).

=== Notable boxers trained ===
- Christopher Algieri, former WBO World Light Welterweight Champion
- Allan Benitez, Lightweight boxer
- Alfonso Blanco, Light Middleweight prospect
- Felipe Campa, former WBC Youth World Super Bantamweight Champion
- Francisco Contreras, Lightweight contender
- Jesus Cuellar, former WBA Fedelatin Featherweight Champion
- Nonito Donaire, world champion in four weight classes and former Ring Magazine pound for pound fighter
- Irving García, Lightweight journeyman
- Mikey Garcia, world champion in four weight classes
- Alfonso Gómez, competitor on The Contender
- Evgeny Gradovich, former IBF Featherweight Champion
- Joan Guzmán, former two divisions WBO World Champion
- Egidijus Kavaliauskas, established former amateur and welterweight title challenger
- Steven Luevano, former WBO World Featherweight Champion; made five successful defenses
- Marcos Maidana, former WBA Welterweight Champion and former WBA Light Welterweight champion
- Abner Mares, current WBA regular featherweight champion
- Antonio Margarito, former two-time World Welterweight Champion
- Hernán Márquez, former WBA World Flyweight Champion
- Hanzel Martínez, Bantamweight boxer; brother-in-law of Antonio Margarito
- Vergil Ortiz Jr., current WBC interim super welterweight champion
- Victor Ortíz, former WBC welterweight champion
- Victor Pasillas, undefeated Featherweight prospect
- Kelly Pavlik, former Lineal Middleweight Champion
- Manuel Quezada, Heavyweight journeyman
- Marcos Reyes, Middleweight boxer
- Brandon Ríos, former WBA World Lightweight Champion
- Marco Antonio Rubio, former WBF World Super Middleweight Champion
- Erik Ruiz, Super Bantamweight journeyman
- Mia St. John, former WIBA, WIBF Lightweight, and WBC Light Middleweight Champion
- Mark Suárez, former WBO NABO Welterweight Champion
- Fernando Vargas, former two-time World Light Middleweight Champion
- Brian Viloria, former WBC and IBF Light Flyweight Champion
- Joshua Franco, former WBA Super Flyweight Champion
- Jesse Rodriguez, current WBC Super Flyweight Champion
- Anthony Joshua, former two-time WBA Heavyweight, IBF Heavyweight, WBO Heavyweight, IBO Heavyweight

== Professional boxing record ==
37 fights	34 wins	3 losses
By knockout	25	3
By decision	9	0

No.	Result	Record	Opponent	Type	Round, time	Date	Location	Notes
37	Win	34–3	John Trigg	TKO	4 (6), 3:00	Sep 22, 2001	Mandalay Bay Events Center, Paradise, Nevada, U.S.	
36	Loss	33–3	Joel Casamayor	TKO	9 (12), 1:14	Jan 6, 2001	Texas Station, North Las Vegas, Nevada, U.S.	For WBA super featherweight title
35	Win	33–2	Sandro Marcos	UD	8	Jul 29, 2000	Veterans Memorial Coliseum, Phoenix, Arizona, U.S.	
34	Loss	32–2	Ben Tackie	TKO	10 (10), 0:35	Jun 3, 2000	MGM Grand Garden Arena, Paradise, Nevada, U.S.	
33	Loss	32–1	Diego Corrales	TKO	7 (12), 0:48	Oct 23, 1999	MGM Grand Garden Arena, Paradise, Nevada, U.S.	Lost IBF super featherweight title
32	Win	32–0	John John Molina	UD	12	Jan 16, 1999	MGM Grand Garden Arena, Paradise, Nevada, U.S.	Retained IBF super featherweight title
31	Win	31–0	Ramon Ledon	KO	5 (12), 0:58	Oct 24, 1998	Trump Taj Mahal, Atlantic City, New Jersey, U.S.	Retained IBF super featherweight title
30	Win	30–0	Harold Warren	UD	12	Mar 13, 1998	Miccosukee Resort & Gaming, Miami, Florida, U.S.	Won vacant IBF super featherweight title
29	Win	29–0	Roy Simpson	TKO	1	Jul 19, 1997	Nashville Arena, Nashville, Tennessee, U.S.	
28	Win	28–0	Angel Aldama	TKO	5, 1:09	Jun 28, 1997	MGM Grand Garden Arena, Paradise, Nevada, U.S.	
27	Win	27–0	Ramon Sanchez	KO	2	Dec 7, 1996	Fantasy Springs Resort Casino, Indio, California, U.S.	
26	Win	26–0	Jose Herrera	TKO	4	Oct 13, 1996	Port Hueneme, California, U.S.	
25	Win	25–0	Jose Luis Madrid	KO	3	Jun 29, 1996	Fantasy Springs Resort Casino, Indio, California, U.S.	
24	Win	24–0	Darryl Pinckney	UD	12	Mar 23, 1996	Miami Arena, Miami, Florida, U.S.	Won vacant NABF featherweight title
23	Win	23–0	Eduardo Montes	TKO	4 (10), 2:20	Jan 27, 1996	Veterans Memorial Coliseum, Phoenix, Arizona, U.S.	
22	Win	22–0	Francisco Segura	TKO	12 (12), 1:10	Jul 29, 1995	Freeman Coliseum, San Antonio, Texas, U.S.	Retained NABF super featherweight title
21	Win	21–0	Julian Wheeler	UD	12	Apr 21, 1995	Arizona Charlie's Decatur, Las Vegas, Nevada	Won vacant NABF super featherweight title
20	Win	20–0	Israel Gonzalez Bringas	TKO	4 (8), 1:17	Mar 21, 1995	Arizona Charlie's Decatur, Las Vegas, Nevada	
19	Win	19–0	Lorenzo Tiznado	TKO	7 (10), 3:00	Feb 18, 1995	MGM Grand Garden Arena, Paradise, Nevada, U.S.	
18	Win	18–0	Roberto Villareal	TKO	5	Dec 10, 1994	Grand Olympic Auditorium, Los Angeles, California, U.S.	
17	Win	17–0	Derrick Gainer	UD	10	Nov 18, 1994	MGM Grand Garden Arena, Paradise, Nevada, U.S.	
16	Win	16–0	Bobby Brewer	KO	3 (10)	Sep 24, 1994	Grand Olympic Auditorium, Los Angeles, California, U.S.	
15	Win	15–0	Frank Avelar	KO	2 (10)	Aug 27, 1994	Grand Olympic Auditorium, Los Angeles, California, U.S.	
14	Win	14–0	Orlando Euceda	TKO	6 (8), 3:00	Jul 29, 1994	MGM Grand Garden Arena, Paradise, Nevada, U.S.	
13	Win	13–0	Raul Contreras	KO	6	Jun 24, 1994	Grand Olympic Auditorium, Los Angeles, California, U.S.	
12	Win	12–0	Gabriel Castro	PTS	6	Mar 20, 1994	Grand Olympic Auditorium, Los Angeles, California, U.S.	
11	Win	11–0	Jose Herrera	PTS	6	Mar 12, 1994	Grand Olympic Auditorium, Los Angeles, California, U.S.	
10	Win	10–0	James Dean	KO	2 (8)	Feb 4, 1994	Civic Auditorium, Oxnard, California, U.S.	
9	Win	9–0	Hector Diaz	KO	2, 2:56	Jan 9, 1994	Del Mar, California, U.S.	
8	Win	8–0	Agapito Navarro	KO	1	Dec 23, 1993	Barona Casino, Lakeside, California, U.S.	
7	Win	7–0	Fred Hernandez	TKO	3	Oct 30, 1993	America West Arena, Phoenix, Arizona, U.S.	
6	Win	6–0	Abel Hinojosa	TKO	1 (6), 1:35	Aug 5, 1993	The Aladdin, Paradise, Nevada, U.S.	
5	Win	5–0	Victor Flores	UD	6	Mar 22, 1993	Great Western Forum, Inglewood, California, U.S.	
4	Win	4–0	Francisco Arroyo	RTD	5 (6), 3:00	Mar 1, 1993	Great Western Forum, Inglewood, California, U.S.	
3	Win	3–0	Jun Peat Hitachi	TKO	5	Nov 20, 1992	Metropolitan Gymnasium, Tokyo, Japan	
2	Win	2–0	Ikuma Shigehara	KO	2	Sep 5, 1992	Tokyo, Japan	
1	Win	1–0	Tsutomu Hitono	KO	2	Jul 15, 1992	Convention Center, Fukuoka, Japan	

== See also ==
- List of Mexican boxing world champions
- List of super-featherweight boxing champions
- List of IBF world champions
- Notable boxing families

Sporting positions
Regional boxing titles
Vacant Title last held by Eddie Hopson	NABF super featherweight champion April 21, 1995 – March 23, 1996; Vacated	Vacant Title next held by Jesús Chávez
Vacant Title last held by Derrick Gainer	NABF featherweight champion March 23, 1996 – August 1996; Vacated	Vacant Title next held by Jesús Chávez
World boxing titles
Vacant Title last held by Arturo Gatti	IBF super featherweight champion March 13, 1998 – October 23, 1999	Succeeded by Diego Corrales
