= Mia St. John =

American boxer (born 1967)

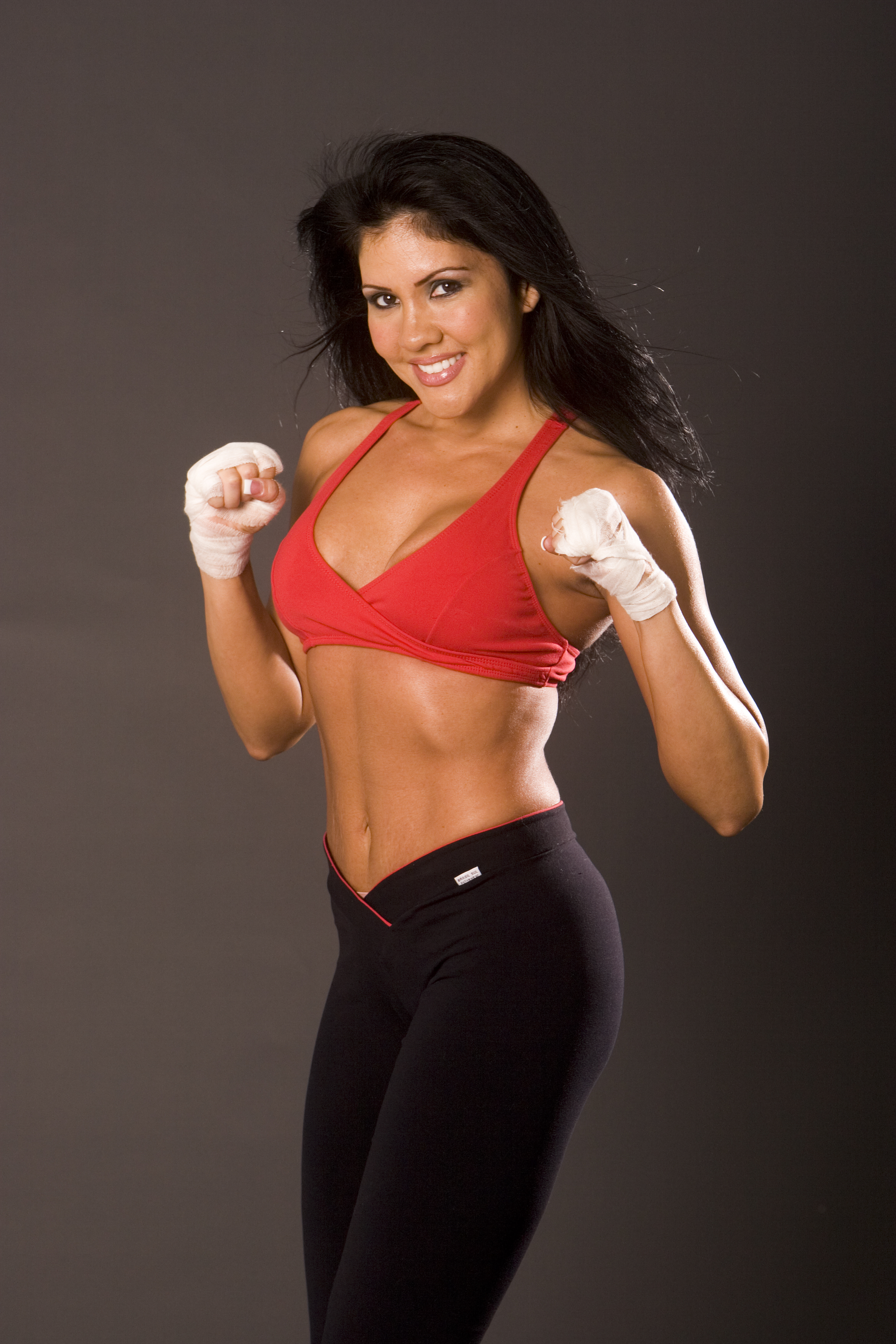
- Mia St. John in 2005

Personal information
- Nickname: The Knockout
- Born: Mia Rosales; June 24, 1967 (age 59) San Francisco, California, U.S.
- Height: 5 ft 6 in (1.68 m)
- Weight: Welterweight; Light welterweight Lightweight; Super featherweight Featherweight

Boxing career
- Reach: 66 1/2 in (169 cm)
- Stance: Orthodox

Boxing record
- Total fights: 65
- Wins: 49
- Win by KO: 19
- Losses: 14
- Draws: 2
- No contests: 0

Mia Rosales St. John (born June 24, 1967) is an American professional boxer and former World Boxing Council (WBC) champion in the super welterweight division. She was also the IBA and IFBA lightweight champion. She is also a model, businesswoman, and taekwondo champion.

== Early life ==
St. John, a Mexican-American with family roots in Zacatecas, Mexico, was born in San Francisco, California. She attended California State University, Northridge, earning a degree in psychology. While a student, she compiled a taekwondo record of 27–1, was awarded a black belt, and worked as a model to fund her education.

She married actor Kristoff St. John. They had two children, son Julian (1989–2014) and daughter Paris. The marriage ended in divorce.

== Professional boxing career ==
At the age of 29, St. John decided to become a professional boxer. In her first bout on February 14, 1997, she knocked out Angelica Villain in 54 seconds of the first round, earning her the nickname "The Knockout."

St. John, whose first manager was Art Lovett, in partnership with his brother Stewart Lovett, would eventually sign a contract with Don King and then Top Rank Boxing, and was featured on the undercard of Oscar De La Hoya bouts. She had 23 fights and won 22 with one draw, 3 KOs and 9 TKOs. All fights were four-rounders and most were televised gaining her national attention. St. John was crowned the "Queen of the Four-Rounders", a title she hated. St. John's opponents were selected by Top Rank without her input.

After her twentieth bout, St. John was injured in a skiing accident that threatened possible amputation of one of her legs. She underwent two operations to remove a blood clot.

In November 1999, St. John appeared on the cover of Playboy magazine and in an 11-page pictorial. She wanted to show that she was a feminine woman as well as an athlete. Critical of her career, the boxing press added the term "Busty Bunny Boxer" in describing St. John.

St. John did not renew her contract with Top Rank in 2001, becoming her own manager and promoter. On November 9, 2001, she lost her first fight to Rolanda Andrews with a TKO in the second round, St. John's first contest after parting with Top Rank.

=== Eduardo and Roberto Garcia ===
St. John turned to trainers Eduardo and Roberto Garcia to learn proper punching techniques, footwork, and defensive strategies. St. John won her next four bouts, one by TKO.

On December 6, 2002, St. John fought top boxer Christy Martin. Martin had a record of 44 wins, 2 losses, and 2 draws. The press laughed at the match-up and predicted St. John would be knocked out early in the bout. St. John, coming up two weight classes, lost the bout but fought toe-to-toe with Martin all ten rounds for a credible performance.

=== WBC, IFBA and IBA lightweight championships ===
On June 12, 2005, and after 47 professional bouts and 9 years, St. John was given a title bout with Liz Drew. St. John won by unanimous decision, earning the International Female Boxers Association lightweight world title. She followed this win with a unanimous decision over Donna Biggers in August, winning the IBA continental lightweight title.

St. John has fought all over the world, including Beijing, China, where she won her IBA Championship. After accumulating an unheard of boxing record of nearly 60 pro fights, on June 14, 2008, St. John fulfilled her dream of fighting in her mother's home country of Mexico. She fought one of the toughest fights of her career and became the WBC international boxing champion of the world at the age of 40.

In November 2008, she was awarded by the Governor of Zacatecas, Mexico, an outstanding achievement award for her role in sports and humanitarianism. The WBC also presented her with the 2008 "WBC Goodwill Ambassador" Award.

In November 2010, Rep. Grace Napolitano joined St. John and LA Laker Ron Artest for an official mental health and suicide prevention training at Napolitano's district office in Santa Fe Springs. Artest and St. John have joined Napolitano to promote the Mental Health in Schools Act, legislation she authored which would increase federal funding for mental health therapists in schools.

She also spoke at the Congressional Hispanic Caucus, where President Barack Obama made a speech at the CHCI's annual Gala.

As well as Congress, St. John speaks in schools and juvenile halls on the importance of education and overcoming hardship. She speaks of her own battles with mental illness, addiction, poverty and overcoming it all, to become a three time international boxing champion.

On August 14, 2012, St. John fought Christy Martin in a long-awaited rematch. Her dream of sixteen years finally materialized and at the age of 45, she captured the WBC super welter weight championship of the world.

On November 10, 2012, St. John was defeated by Tiffany Junot in Bakersfield, California, losing her WBC Female Super Welterweight Championship in a unanimous decision.

On April 14, 2016, St. John had her last boxing bout in New Zealand on the Kali Reis vs. Maricela Cornejo undercard as the curtain call. This was her retirement bout, winning by TKO in the 4th round.

In August 2018, St. John admitted to the use of prohibited substances including steroids and masking agents in preparation for around 20 bouts, stating that "everyone does it and everyone in boxing knows it."

== MMA career ==
On January 26, 2008, in Honolulu, Hawaii, St. John's fighting career took yet another turn. "Returning to her roots" in the martial arts, she competed in her first mixed martial arts (MMA) contest and, with a combination of kicks and punches, defeated her opponent Rhonda Gallegos with a first-round knockout.

== Professional boxing record ==
65 fights	49 wins	14 losses
By knockout	19	5
By decision	30	9
Draws	2	

No.	Result	Record	Opponent	Type	Round, time	Date	Location	Notes
65	Win	49–14–2	(New Zealand) Lisa Lewis	TKO	4 (4), 1:37	Apr 16, 2016	The Trusts Arena, Auckland, New Zealand	
64	Win	48–14–2	(United States) Tammy Franks	UD	4	Oct 23, 2015	(United States) Mayflower Renaissance Hotel, Washington, District of Columbia, USA	
63	Loss	47–14–2	(United States) Tori Nelson	TKO	2, 0:42	May 17, 2014	(United States) Northern Virginia Community College, Annandale, Virginia, USA	Women's International Boxing Association World welterweight title
62	Loss	47–13–2	(Norway) Cecilia Brækhus	TKO	3, 1:38	Apr 13, 2013	Arena Nord, Frederikshavn, Denmark	WBA World female welterweight title WBO World female welterweight title WBC World female welterweight title
61	Loss	47–12–2	(United States) Tiffany Junot	UD	10	Nov 10, 2012	(United States) Home Base Building, Bakersfield, California, USA	WBC World female super welterweight title
60	Win	47–11–2	(United States) Christy Martin	UD	10	Aug 14, 2012	(United States) Table Mountain Casino, Friant, California, USA	vacant WBC World female super welterweight title
59	Win	46–11–2	(United States) Tammy Franks	UD	6	Oct 16, 2010	(United States) Santa Ana Star Casino, Bernalillo, New Mexico, USA	
58	Loss	45–11–2	(Germany) Rola El-Halabi	TKO	5, 0:43	Mar 20, 2010	Kuhberg Halle, Ulm, Germany	Women's International Boxing Association World lightweight title and Women's International Boxing Federation World lightweight title
57	Loss	45–10–2	(United States) Brooke Dierdorff	UD	8	Apr 4, 2009	Ciudad Victoria, Tamaulipas, Mexico	WBC International female lightweight title
56	Win	45–9–2	(Colombia) Darys Esther Pardo	UD	8	Dec 20, 2008	Parque Andrés Quintana Roo, Cozumel, Quintana Roo, Mexico	WBC International female lightweight title
55	Win	44–9–2	(United States) Amy Yuratovac	MD	8	Jun 14, 2008	Palacio de los Deportes, Mexico City, Distrito Federal, Mexico	vacant WBC International female welterweight title
54	Loss	43–9–2	(United States) Brooke Dierdorff	SD	6	Apr 20, 2007	(United States) Star Plaza Theater, Merrillville, Indiana, USA	
53	Loss	43–8–2	(Canada) Jaime Clampitt	UD	10	Feb 9, 2007	(United States) Convention Center, Providence, Rhode Island, USA	vacant International Women's Boxing Federation World lightweight title
52	Loss	43–7–2	(Canada) Jelena Mrdjenovich	UD	10	Jun 23, 2006	Shaw Conference Centre, Edmonton, Alberta, Canada	vacant Women's International Boxing Federation World lightweight title
51	Win	43–6–2	(United States) Shelby Walker	TKO	3	Apr 1, 2006	(United States) Palo Duro Creek Country Club, Nogales, Arizona, USA	
50	Loss	42–6–2	(United States) Holly Holm	UD	10	Dec 8, 2005	(United States) Isleta Casino & Resort, Albuquerque, New Mexico, USA	International Boxing Association female super lightweight title
49	Win	42–5–2	(United States) Donna Biggers	UD	10	Aug 20, 2005	Capital Gym, Beijing, China	International Female Boxers Association World lightweight title
48	Win	41–5–2	(United States) Liz Drew	UD	10	Jun 12, 2005	(United States) Ohkay Casino, San Juan Pueblo, New Mexico, USA	vacant International Female Boxers Association World lightweight title
47	Loss	40–5–2	(Canada) Jessica Rakoczy	TKO	2	Feb 10, 2005	(United States) Palace Indian Gaming Center, Lemoore, California, USA	
46	Win	40–4–2	(United States) Joy Irvin	TKO	2, 1:14	Feb 3, 2005	(United States) HP Pavilion, San Jose, California, USA	
45	Win	39–4–2	(United States) Janae Archuleta	TKO	1, 1:46	Dec 18, 2004	(United States) Staples Center, Los Angeles, California, USA	
44	Win	38–4–2	(United States) Lana Alexander	UD	4	Nov 6, 2004	(United States) Grand Casino Coushatta, Kinder, Louisiana, USA	
43	Win	37–4–2	(United States) Janae Archuleta	UD	4	Oct 23, 2004	(United States) Activity Center, Maywood, California, USA	
42	Win	36–4–2	(United States) Janae Archuleta	UD	4	Oct 15, 2004	(United States) Casino Del Sol, Tucson, Arizona, USA	
41	Win	35–4–2	(United States) Ragan Pudwill	UD	4	Aug 13, 2004	(United States) Buffalo Chip Campground, Sturgis, South Dakota, USA	
40	Win	34–4–2	(United States) Talia Smith	UD	4	Jul 29, 2004	(United States) Oakland Arena, Oakland, California, USA	
39	Win	33–4–2	(United States) Melissa Yanas	TKO	3, 0:34	Jul 23, 2004	(United States) Club Avalon, Denver, Colorado, USA	
38	Win	32–4–2	(United States) Lana Alexander	TKO	4, 1:57	May 8, 2004	(United States) Coast Coliseum, Biloxi, Mississippi, USA	
37	Loss	31–4–2	(Canada) Jessica Rakoczy	UD	8	Apr 15, 2004	(United States) Palace Indian Gaming Center, Lemoore, California, USA	
36	Win	31–3–2	(United States) Ragan Pudwill	UD	4	Feb 7, 2004	(United States) Grand Casino Coushatta, Kinder, Louisiana, USA	
35	Win	30–3–2	(United States) Franchesca Alcanter	UD	4	Jan 24, 2004	(United States) Bank of America Center, Boise, Idaho, USA	
34	Win	29–3–2	(United States) Jessica Mohs	UD	4	Oct 10, 2003	(United States) Desert Diamond Casino, Tucson, Arizona, USA	
33	Draw	28–3–2	(Canada) Olivia Gerula	PTS	6	Sep 19, 2003	(United States) 4 Bears Casino & Lodge, New Town, North Dakota, USA	
32	Win	28–3–1	(United States) Jessica Mohs	UD	4	Jul 11, 2003	(United States) City Center Pavilion, Reno, Nevada, USA	
31	Loss	27–3–1	(United States) Jenifer Alcorn	UD	8	Apr 19, 2003	(United States) Selland Arena, Fresno, California, USA	
30	Win	27–2–1	(United States) Jessica Mohs	UD	6	Mar 15, 2003	(United States) Club Life, Dallas, Texas, USA	
29	Loss	26–2–1	(United States) Christy Martin	UD	10	Dec 6, 2002	(United States) Silverdome, Pontiac, Michigan, USA	
28	Win	26–1–1	(United States) Elisha Olivas	TKO	3, 1:52	Aug 10, 2002	(United States) Soboba Casino, San Jacinto, California, USA	
27	Win	25–1–1	(United States) Kristy Follmar	MD	4	May 18, 2002	(United States) Silver Star Casino, Choctaw, Mississippi, USA	
26	Win	24–1–1	(United States) Janae Archuleta	MD	4	Apr 7, 2002	(United States) Soboba Casino, San Jacinto, California, USA	
25	Win	23–1–1	(United States) Gina Greenwald	UD	4	Jan 18, 2002	(United States) Sports Arena, Raleigh, North Carolina, USA	
24	Loss	22–1–1	(United States) Rolanda Andrews	TKO	2, 1:47	Nov 8, 2001	(United States) Sunset Station, San Antonio, Texas, USA	
23	Draw	22–0–1	(United States) Imelda Arias	MD	4	Jul 28, 2001	(United States) Staples Center, Los Angeles, California, USA	
22	Win	22–0	(United States) Linda Tenberg	UD	4	May 13, 2001	(United States) The Hangar, West Wendover, Utah, USA	
21	Win	21–0	(United States) Amy Yerkes	TKO	3, 1:49	Mar 25, 2001	(United States) Greyhound Park, Phoenix, Arizona, USA	
20	Win	20–0	(United States) Sherri Thompson	TKO	3, 1:55	Jan 20, 2001	(United States) MGM Grand Garden Arena, Paradise, Nevada, U.S.	
19	Win	19–0	(United States) Amy Yerkes	TKO	4, 1:18	Dec 3, 2000	(United States) Plaza Hotel & Casino, Las Vegas, Nevada, USA	
18	Win	18–0	(United States) Linda Robinson	UD	4	Jun 17, 2000	(United States) Staples Center, Los Angeles, California, USA	
17	Win	17–0	(United States) Franchesca Alcanter	UD	4	May 19, 2000	(United States) Playboy Mansion, Beverly Hills, California, USA	
16	Win	16–0	(United States) Kristin Allen	MD	4	Feb 26, 2000	(United States) Madison Square Garden, New York, New York, USA	
15	Win	15–0	(United States) Kelly Whaley	UD	4	Jan 22, 2000	(United States) Del Mar Fairgrounds, Del Mar, California, USA	
14	Win	14–0	(United States) Sharon Sirls	TKO	1	Dec 11, 1999	(United States) Dixie Junior College, Saint George, Utah, USA	
13	Win	13–0	(United States) Kelley Downey	TKO	4, 1:40	Sep 18, 1999	(United States) Mandalay Bay Resort & Casino, Las Vegas, Nevada, USA	
12	Win	12–0	(United States) Maryanne Haik	UD	4	Jun 26, 1999	(United States) Mandalay Bay Resort & Casino, Las Vegas, Nevada, USA	
11	Win	11–0	(United States) Chris Sepulvado	TKO	1, 1:30	May 8, 1999	(United States) Hilton Hotel, Las Vegas, Nevada, USA	
10	Win	10–0	(United States) Amanda Skelton	UD	4	Feb 13, 1999	(United States) Thomas & Mack Center, Las Vegas, Nevada, USA	
9	Win	9–0	(United States) Brandy Mae Vaughn	KO	2	Dec 12, 1998	(United States) Fantasy Springs Casino, Indio, California, USA	
8	Win	8–0	(United States) Brenda Felter	SD	4	Sep 19, 1998	(United States) Thomas & Mack Center, Las Vegas, Nevada, USA	
7	Win	7–0	(United States) Brenda Felter	UD	4	Aug 15, 1998	(United States) Olympic Auditorium, Los Angeles, California, USA	
6	Win	6–0	(United States) Chris Sepulvado	KO	2	May 30, 1998	(United States) Olympic Auditorium, Los Angeles, California, USA	
5	Win	5–0	(United States) Dolores Lira	UD	4	Nov 28, 1999	(United States) Marriott Hotel, Irvine, California, USA	
4	Win	4–0	(United States) Dawn Wimer	TKO	1	Aug 5, 1997	(United States) Nashville, Tennessee, USA	
3	Win	3–0	(United States) Contina Frederick	TKO	3	Jun 21, 1997	(United States) Sun Dome, Tampa, Florida, USA	
2	Win	2–0	(United States) Dawn Graham	TKO	1, 1:32	Apr 19, 1997	(United States) Celebrity Theater, Phoenix, Arizona, USA	
1	Win	1–0	(United States) Angelica Villian	KO	1	Feb 14, 1997	(United States) Fantasy Springs Casino, Indio, California, USA	

== Mixed martial arts record ==
Professional record breakdown
1 match	1 win	0 losses
By knockout	1	0
By submission	0	0
By decision	0	0

Res.	Record	Opponent	Method	Event	Date	Round	Time	Location	Notes
Win	1–0	Rhonda Gallegos	KO (punches)	X-1 Champions	January 26, 2008	1	0:44	Honolulu, Hawaii, United States	

Sporting positions
Major world boxing titles
Vacant Title last held by Christy Martin	WBC female light-middleweight champion August 14, 2012 – November 10, 2012	Succeeded by Tiffany Junot
