= Philip Holiday =

South African boxer (born 1970)

Personal information
- Nickname: No Deal
- Nationality: South African
- Born: 23 May 1970 (age 56) Benoni, Gauteng, South Africa
- Height: 5 ft 6 in (168 cm)
- Weight: Lightweight; Light-welterweight; Welterweight

Boxing career
- Reach: 68 in (173 cm)

Boxing record
- Total fights: 47
- Wins: 39
- Win by KO: 22
- Losses: 7
- Draws: 1

Phillip James Holiday (born 23 May 1970) is a South African former professional boxer who competed from 1991 to 2010. He won the IBF lightweight title in 1995, making six successful defences until suffering the first defeat of his career against Shane Mosley.

== Professional boxing record ==
47 fights	39 wins	7 losses
By knockout	22	2
By decision	17	5
Draws	1	

No.	Result	Record	Opponent	Type	Round, time	Date	Location	Notes
47	Loss	39–7–1	Jason Kanofski	SD	10	10 Jun 2010	Mansfield Tavern, Mansfield, Australia	For vacant Australian light middleweight title
46	Loss	38–7–1	Samuel Colomban	RTD	11 (12), 3:00	18 Mar 2010	Racecourse Atrium Room, Flemington, Australia	For WBO Oriental welterweight title
45	Loss	38–6–1	Muhammad Abdullaev	TKO	4 (12), 0:55	19 Jan 2003	Telstra Superdome, Melbourne, Australia	For vacant WBO Inter-Continental light welterweight title
44	Win	38–5–1	Fred Kinuthia	SD	10	8 Nov 2002	Town Hall, Springvale, Australia	
43	Win	37–5–1	Ernie Artango	TKO	8 (10)	27 Sep 2002	Southport RSL Club, Gold Coast, Australia	
42	Loss	36–5–1	Anders Styve	UD	6	16 Jun 2001	Brøndbyhallen, Brøndby, Denmark	
41	Loss	36–4–1	Héctor Camacho Jr.	TD	6 (12)	29 Jul 2000	Veterans Memorial Coliseum, Phoenix, Arizona, U.S.	For WBA-NABA light welterweight title; Unanimous TD
40	Draw	36–3–1	Gerald Reed	TD	4 (8), 0:42	20 May 2000	Ballys Park Hotel Casino, Atlantic City, New Jersey, U.S.	
39	Loss	36–3	Thomas Damgaard	UD	12	18 Feb 2000	Aalborghallen, Aalborg, Denmark	For vacant IBC welterweight title
38	Win	36–2	Stephanus Carr	RTD	4 (10)	28 Aug 1999	Carousel Casino, Hammanskraal, South Africa	
37	Win	35–2	Shawn Simmons	TKO	5 (10)	8 Jun 1999	Carousel Casino, Hammanskraal, South Africa	
36	Loss	34–2	Colin Dunne	UD	12	27 Feb 1999	York Hall, London, England	For WBU lightweight title
35	Win	34–1	José Luis Baltazar	TKO	7 (10), 0:23	12 Dec 1998	Elephant & Castle Centre, London, England	
34	Win	33–1	Tanveer Ahmed	RTD	5 (8)	17 Oct 1998	Carousel Casino, Hammanskraal, South Africa	
33	Win	32–1	Miguel Chavez	TKO	6 (10), 2:30	25 Apr 1998	National Ice Rink, Cardiff, Wales	
32	Loss	31–1	Shane Mosley	UD	12	2 Aug 1997	Mohegan Sun Casino, Uncasville, Connecticut, U.S.	Lost IBF lightweight title
31	Win	31–0	Pete Taliaferro	SD	12	16 May 1997	Carousel Casino, Hammanskraal, South Africa	Retained IBF lightweight title
30	Win	30–0	Ivan Robinson	UD	12	21 Dec 1996	Mohegan Sun Casino, Uncasville, Connecticut, U.S.	Retained IBF lightweight title
29	Win	29–0	Joel Díaz Jr.	UD	12	19 Oct 1996	Wembley Indoor Arena, Johannesburg, South Africa	Retained IBF lightweight title
28	Win	28–0	Jeff Fenech	TKO	2 (12), 2:18	18 May 1996	The Glass House, Melbourne, Australia	Retained IBF lightweight title
27	Win	27–0	John Lark	TKO	10 (12), 2:32	17 Feb 1996	Carousel Casino, Hammanskraal, South Africa	Retained IBF lightweight title
26	Win	26–0	Rocky Martínez	UD	12	4 Nov 1995	Superbowl, Sun City, South Africa	Retained IBF lightweight title
25	Win	25–0	Miguel Julio	RTD	10 (12), 3:00	19 Aug 1995	Superbowl, Sun City, South Africa	Won vacant IBF lightweight title
24	Win	24–0	Gene Reed	RTD	4 (10)	4 Feb 1995	Morula Sun Casino, Mabopane, South Africa	
23	Win	23–0	Harold Miller	UD	10	26 Nov 1994	Superbowl, Sun City, South Africa	
22	Win	22–0	Danny Myburgh	KO	5 (10)	20 Aug 1994	Carousel Casino, Hammanskraal, South Africa	
21	Win	21–0	Jesse Torres	PTS	10	7 May 1994	Harrah's Marina Hotel Casino, Atlantic City, New Jersey, U.S.	
20	Win	20–0	Bobby Giepert	UD	8	19 Mar 1994	Carousel Casino, Hammanskraal, South Africa	
19	Win	19–0	Jorge Palomares	UD	8	5 Feb 1994	Aladdin Hotel & Casino, Paradise, Nevada, U.S.	
18	Win	18–0	Sugar Baby Rojas	UD	10	20 Nov 1993	Carousel Casino, Hammanskraal, South Africa	
17	Win	17–0	Mike Juárez	PTS	10	29 Sep 1993	Morula Sum Casino, Mabopane, South Africa	
16	Win	16–0	Harry Escott	UD	8	21 Jul 1993	Carousel Casino, Hammanskraal, South Africa	
15	Win	15–0	Kevin Toomey	KO	2 (8)	25 May 1993	Carousel Casino, Hammanskraal, South Africa	
14	Win	14–0	Chuck Richards	UD	8	6 Apr 1993	Carousel Casino, Hammanskraal, South Africa	
13	Win	13–0	Verdell Smith	TKO	8 (8)	16 Jan 1993	Freeman Coliseum, San Antonio, Texas, U.S.	
12	Win	12–0	Peter Bradley	TKO	6 (8)	24 Oct 1992	Morula Sun Casino, Mabopane, South Africa	
11	Win	11–0	Sipho Mathonsi	TKO	2 (6)	22 Sep 1992	Morula Sun Casino, Mabopane, South Africa	
10	Win	10–0	Mabili Ndlovu	PTS	8	22 Aug 1992	Superbowl, Sun City, South Africa	
9	Win	9–0	Ivor Levesse	TKO	3 (6)	24 Jun 1992	Town Hall, Benoni, South Africa	
8	Win	8–0	Bheki Dlamini	RTD	4 (6)	9 Jun 1992	Carousel Casino, Hammanskraal, South Africa	
7	Win	7–0	Simon Oupa Thobejane	TKO	5 (6)	14 Apr 1992	Carousel Casino, Hammanskraal, South Africa	
6	Win	6–0	Christian Dabula	TKO	6 (6)	22 Feb 1992	Superbowl, Sun City, South Africa	
5	Win	5–0	Muzi Vilakazi	PTS	6	4 Feb 1992	Morula Sun Casino, Mabopane, South Africa	
4	Win	4–0	Sydney Makohba	TKO	1 (6)	23 Nov 1991	Superbowl, Sun City, South Africa	
3	Win	3–0	Livingstone Maxengwane	TKO	1 (6)	8 Oct 1991	Nasrec Indoor Arena, Johannesburg, South Africa	
2	Win	2–0	Paulos Morobi	PTS	4	1 Jun 1991	Nasrec Indoor Arena, Johannesburg, South Africa	
1	Win	1–0	Timothy Kabene	TKO	2 (4)	18 Apr 1991	Morula Sun Casino, Mabopane, South Africa	

== See also ==
- List of IBF world champions

Achievements
Preceded by Oscar De La Hoya; Vacates	IBF Lightweight boxing champion 19 Aug 1995 – 2 Aug 1997	Succeeded by Shane Mosley
