= Arturo Gatti vs. Floyd Mayweather Jr. =

Boxing competition

Thunder & Lightning
- Date: June 25, 2005
- Venue: Boardwalk Hall, Atlantic City, New Jersey, U.S.
- Title(s) on the line: WBC super lightweight title

Tale of the tape
Boxer	Arturo Gatti	Floyd Mayweather Jr.
Nickname	Thunder	Pretty Boy
Hometown	Montreal, Quebec, Canada	Grand Rapids, Michigan, U.S.
Purse	$3,500,000	$3,200,000
Pre-fight record	39–6 (30 KO)	33–0 (22 KO)
Age	33 years, 2 months	28 years, 4 months
Height	5 ft 7 1/2 in (171 cm)	5 ft 8 in (173 cm)
Weight	140 lb (64 kg)	139 lb (63 kg)
Style	Orthodox	Orthodox
Recognition	WBC; Super Lightweight Champion; The Ring; No. 1 Ranked Super Lightweight; 2-division world champion	WBC; No. 1 Ranked Super Lightweight; The Ring; No. 3 Ranked Super Lightweight; The Ring No. 2 ranked pound-for-pound fighter 2-division world champion

Result
- Mayweather Jr. wins via 6th-round RTD

Arturo Gatti vs. Floyd Mayweather Jr., billed as Thunder & Lightning, was a professional boxing match contested on June 25, 2005, for the WBC super lightweight championship.

== Background ==
The Gatti–Mayweather bout had been in the making for over a year. After a tough trilogy with Mickey Ward, Gatti earned a shot at the vacant WBC super lightweight (AKA light welterweight) championship, winning the title on January 21, 2004, with a unanimous decision victory over Gianluca Branco. Four months later, Mayweather would vacate his WBC and The Ring lightweight title and move up to the light welterweight division. Initially, Mayweather was set to face the undefeated former IBF lightweight champion Paul Spadafora to determine who would be the mandatory challenger to Gatti's title, but the fight was nixed due to Spadafora's legal troubles. Instead, Mayweather was matched up against former WBO light welterweight champion DeMarcus Corley in a WBC "eliminator" bout on May 22, 2004. In his light welterweight debut, Mayweather had Corley down on the canvas no less than seven times (though only two were declared official knockdowns) and cruised to an easy, lopsided unanimous decision that made him the number one contender to Gatti's title. After a successful defense against Leonard Dorin, Gatti announced his intentions to face Mayweather. However, several disagreements hindered the negotiations and the two sides would not reach an agreement until March 2005 for a June 25 fight in New Jersey. Prior to the fight, Mayweather repeatedly bashed Gatti in the press, calling him, among other things, a "C-plus fighter", "club fighter" and a "bum." For the most part, Gatti refused to appear at press conferences with Mayweather, saying "I just don't want to be bothered by his mouth." Mayweather, however, crashed a Gatti press conference, referring to him as a "paper champion" and lampooning his struggle to make weight by loading food on a plate.

== The fight ==
In his Pay Per View debut, Mayweather dominated Gatti through six rounds. Late in the first round as Gatti bent forwards, Mayweather leaned on him and the referee instructed, "Stop punching." Mayweather continued to punch and Gatti looked to the referee to complain. With Gatti's attention turned towards the referee, Mayweather landed a left hook that sent Gatti into the ropes and on his knee. Despite the violation of his instruction, the referee counted the knockdown. Things would only go downhill for Gatti as Mayweather continued to overwhelm the champion with his quickness and hand speed, landing combinations at will. After losing all six rounds on the scorecards and having landed only 41 total punches to Mayweather's 168, Gatti's trainer and cornerman Buddy McGirt stopped the fight following the sixth round, giving Mayweather an automatic technical knockout victory.

== Aftermath ==
In the post-fight interview, Mayweather praised Gatti, claiming that his pre-fight comments "were just to sell tickets".

== Undercard ==
Confirmed bouts:

Weight Class	Weight		vs.		Method	Round	Notes
Super Lightweight	140 lbs.	Floyd Mayweather Jr.	def.	Arturo Gatti (c)	RTD	6/12	^{note 1}
Super Lightweight	140 lbs.	Carlos Maussa	def.	Vivian Harris (c)	KO	7/12	^{note 2}
Minimumweight	105 lbs.	Iván Calderón (c)	def.	Gerardo Verde	UD	12/12	^{note 3}
Heavyweight	200+ lbs.	Calvin Brock	def.	Kenny Craven	TKO	4/10
Super Welterweight	154 lbs.	Joel Julio	def.	Arthur Medina	TKO	1/10
Super Welterweight	154 lbs.	Giovanni Lorenzo	def.	Ronald Weaver	UD	8/8
Welterweight	147 lbs.	Julio César Chávez Jr.	def.	Rubén Galván	TKO	4/8
Super Lightweight	140 lbs.	Wes Ferguson	def.	John Temple	UD	4/4
Welterweight	147 lbs.	Henry Crawford	def.	Fernando Jimenez	TKO	1/4

^Note 1 For WBC Super Lightweight Title
^Note 2 For WBA Super Lightweight Title
^Note 3 For WBO Minimumweight Title

== Broadcasting ==
Country	Broadcaster
Australia	Main Event
Canada	Viewers Choice
Hungary	Sport 1
United States	HBO

Preceded by vs. Jesse James Leija	Arturo Gatti's bouts 25 June 2005	Succeeded by vs. Thomas Damgaard
Preceded by vs. Henry Bruseles	Floyd Mayweather Jr.'s bouts 25 June 2005	Succeeded by vs. Sharmba Mitchell
