= Ivan Robinson =

American boxer

Personal information
- Nickname: Mighty
- Born: Ivan Robinson; February 27, 1971 (age 55) Philadelphia, Pennsylvania, U.S.
- Height: 5 ft 9 in (175 cm)
- Weight: Lightweight

Boxing career
- Reach: 70 in (178 cm)
- Stance: Orthodox

Boxing record
- Total fights: 46
- Wins: 32
- Win by KO: 12
- Losses: 12
- Draws: 2

Ivan "Mighty" Robinson (born February 27, 1971) is an American professional boxer who has compiled a record of 36–12–2 (12 KOs) since becoming a professional in 1992. He challenged once for the IBF lightweight title in 1996, losing to Phillip Holiday by 12-round unanimous decision.

== Background ==
Born and raised in Philadelphia, Robinson began boxing from an early age. He attended Simon Gratz High School.

== Amateur career ==
Robinson had a stellar amateur career and was a national amateur champion. Some of his highlights are below:

- Featherweight Silver Medalist at 1990 Goodwill Games in Seattle, United States. Results were:
  - Kirkor Kirkorov (Bulgaria) won on points
  - Faat Gatin (Soviet Union) won by TKO 3
  - Oscar De La Hoya (United States) lost on points
- 1991 United States Amateur Featherweight Champion
- 1991 World Championships in Sydney, Australia, competed as a Featherweight. Results were:
  - Jose Fernandes (Portugal) won on points
  - Duk-Kyu Park (South Korea) lost on points
- Attempted to qualify for the Olympics as a Featherweight at the 1992 Olympic Trials in competition at Worcester, MA. Results were:
  - Kenneth Friday won on points
  - Michael Clark won on points
  - Julian Wheeler lost on points, in final
  - Julian Wheeler lost on points, at Box-Offs in Phoenix, AZ

== Professional career ==
Robinson had been a lightweight and Junior Welterweight contender. He has been in several notable bouts, particularly his first victory over Arturo Gatti, a fight that was voted Fight of the Year by Ring magazine. Other notable bouts include his second bout with Gatti, (which he also won), and his 12 round whirlwind bout with then lightweight champion Phillip Holiday. Robinson fought on May 28, 2005, when he lost a 10-round unanimous decision to Julio César Chávez at Staples Center in Los Angeles.

He won the USBA and NABF lightweight titles over his career. Fans consider Robinson a great sportsman, who fought Mexican legend Julio César Chávez and fought wars with Arturo Gatti.

In 2013, Ivan Robinson was inducted into the Pennsylvania Boxing Hall of Fame. He was one of 10 inductees in the 10-member class of 2013.

== Professional boxing record ==
| 46 fights | 32 wins | 12 losses |
|---|---|---|
| By knockout | 12 | 3 |
| By decision | 19 | 9 |
| By disqualification | 1 | 0 |
| Draws | 2 | |

| No. | Result | Record | Opponent | Type | Round, time | Date | Location | Notes |
|---|---|---|---|---|---|---|---|---|
| 46 | Loss | 32–12–2 | Favio Medina | UD | 10 | Jul 3, 2005 | Coeur d'Alene Casino, Worley, Idaho, U.S. | |
| 45 | Loss | 32–11–2 | Darien Ford | SD | 6 | Jun 8, 2005 | National Guard Armory, Philadelphia, Pennsylvania, U.S. | |
| 44 | Loss | 32–10–2 | Julio César Chávez Sr. | UD | 10 | May 28, 2005 | Staples Center, Los Angeles, California, U.S. | |
| 43 | Win | 32–9–2 | Tyrone Winckler | UD | 6 | Feb 18, 2005 | Blue Horizon, Philadelphia, Pennsylvania, U.S. | |
| 42 | Loss | 31–9–2 | Reggie Nash | SD | 8 | Aug 17, 2004 | Valley Forge Convention Center, Valley Forge, Pennsylvania, U.S. | |
| 41 | Loss | 31–8–2 | Michael Stewart | TKO | 8 (12) | Nov 11, 2003 | Adam’s Mark Hotel, Philadelphia, Pennsylvania, U.S. | For USBA super lightweight title |
| 40 | Win | 31–7–2 | Mike McFail | UD | 6 | Jun 19, 2003 | Adam’s Mark Hotel, Philadelphia, Pennsylvania, U.S. | |
| 39 | Draw | 30–7–2 | Luis Alberto Santiago | PTS | 12 | Nov 15, 2002 | First Union Spectrum, Philadelphia, Pennsylvania, U.S. | |
| 38 | Loss | 30–7–1 | Charles Tschorniawsky | MD | 10 | Oct 11, 2002 | First Union Spectrum, Philadelphia, Pennsylvania, U.S. | |
| 37 | Loss | 30–6–1 | Efren Hinojosa | UD | 10 | Jul 6, 2001 | Harrah's Tahoe, Lake Tahoe, Nevada, U.S. | |
| 36 | Win | 30–5–1 | Alric Johnson | TKO | 8 (10), 3:00 | Mar 2, 2001 | Turning Stone Resort & Casino, Verona, California, U.S. | |
| 35 | Loss | 29–5–1 | Jesse James Leija | UD | 10 | Nov 11, 2000 | Mandalay Bay Resort & Casino, Las Vegas, Nevada, U.S. | |
| 34 | Draw | 29–4–1 | Vivian Harris | PTS | 10 | Aug 11, 2000 | Tropicana Hotel & Casino, Atlantic City, New Jersey, U.S. | |
| 33 | Loss | 29–4 | Antonio Díaz | TKO | 11 (12), 1:40 | Apr 15, 2000 | Mandalay Bay Resort & Casino, Las Vegas, Nevada, U.S. | For IBA super lightweight title |
| 32 | Win | 29–3 | Tyrone Flucker | KO | 2 (8) | Nov 11, 1999 | Henry's Brewery, Philadelphia, Pennsylvania, U.S. | |
| 31 | Win | 28–3 | James Crayton | UD | 12 | Sep 3, 1999 | Harrahs Casino, Cherokee, North Carolina, U.S. | Won NABF lightweight title |
| 30 | Loss | 27–3 | Angel Manfredy | UD | 10 | Apr 17, 1999 | Fantasy Springs Casino, Indio, California, U.S. | |
| 29 | Win | 27–2 | Arturo Gatti | UD | 10 | Dec 12, 1998 | Trump Taj Mahal, Atlantic City, New Jersey, U.S. | |
| 28 | Win | 26–2 | Arturo Gatti | SD | 10 | Aug 22, 1998 | Convention Hall, Atlantic City, New Jersey, U.S. | |
| 27 | Win | 25–2 | Manuel De Leon | UD | 8 | May 1, 1998 | Armory, Philadelphia, Pennsylvania, U.S. | |
| 26 | Win | 24–2 | Dezi Ford | UD | 10 | Nov 7, 1997 | First Union Center, Philadelphia, Pennsylvania, U.S. | |
| 25 | Loss | 23–2 | Israel Cardona | TKO | 3 (12), 1:22 | Jul 1, 1997 | Mohegan Sun Casino, Uncasville, Connecticut, U.S. | Lost USBA lightweight title |
| 24 | Loss | 23–1 | Phillip Holiday | UD | 12 | Dec 21, 1996 | Mohegan Sun Casino, Uncasville, Connecticut, U.S. | For IBF lightweight title |
| 23 | Win | 23–0 | Emanuel Augustus | UD | 10 | Jul 21, 1996 | Teamster's Hall, Baltimore, Maryland, U.S. | |
| 22 | Win | 22–0 | Sammy Mejias | DQ | 9 (12) | May 21, 1996 | Blue Horizon, Philadelphia, Pennsylvania, U.S. | Retained USBA lightweight title; Mejias was DQ'd for excessive low blows |
| 21 | Win | 21–0 | Demetrio Ceballos | UD | 12 | Oct 17, 1995 | Blue Horizon, Philadelphia, Pennsylvania, U.S. | Won USBA lightweight title |
| 20 | Win | 20–0 | Edwin Ruiz | TKO | 3 (10), 2:40 | Jun 23, 1995 | Blue Horizon, Philadelphia, Pennsylvania, U.S. | |
| 19 | Win | 19–0 | Jimmy Deoria | TKO | 5 (10) | Jun 6, 1995 | Blue Horizon, Philadelphia, Pennsylvania, U.S. | |
| 18 | Win | 18–0 | Isaac Cruz | UD | 10 | Apr 4, 1995 | Blue Horizon, Philadelphia, Pennsylvania, U.S. | |
| 17 | Win | 17–0 | Lionel Butler | UD | 10 | Jan 28, 1995 | Ballys Park Place Hotel Casino, Atlantic City, New Jersey, U.S. | |
| 16 | Win | 16–0 | Juan Negron | SD | 10 | Nov 22, 1994 | Meadowlands Convention Center, Secaucus, New Jersey, U.S. | |
| 15 | Win | 15–0 | Isander Lacen | RTD | 5 (8), 3:00 | Oct 11, 1994 | Blue Horizon, Philadelphia, Pennsylvania, U.S. | |
| 14 | Win | 14–0 | Kevin Marston | TKO | 1 (8), 2:18 | Aug 19, 1994 | Trump Plaza Hotel, Atlantic City, New Jersey, U.S. | |
| 13 | Win | 13–0 | Lyndon Walker | UD | 8 | Jul 1, 1994 | PA Convention Center, Philadelphia, Pennsylvania, U.S. | |
| 12 | Win | 12–0 | Fred Valera | UD | 10 | Jun 11, 1994 | Ballys Park Place Hotel Casino, Atlantic City, New Jersey, U.S. | |
| 11 | Win | 11–0 | Luis Maysonet | UD | 8 | Apr 21, 1994 | National Guard Armory, Philadelphia, Pennsylvania, U.S. | |
| 10 | Win | 10–0 | Eugene Dundee | TKO | 1 (8), 1:43 | Mar 17, 1994 | National Guard Armory, Philadelphia, Pennsylvania, U.S. | |
| 9 | Win | 9–0 | Arturo Nina | SD | 8 | Jan 8, 1994 | Friar Tuck Inn, Catskill, New York, U.S. | |
| 8 | Win | 8–0 | Darrett Crockett | TKO | 2 (8) | Aug 10, 1993 | Memorial Auditorium, Greenville, South Carolina, U.S. | |
| 7 | Win | 7–0 | Leon Bostic | UD | 6 | Jun 26, 1993 | Convention Center, Atlantic City, New Jersey, U.S. | |
| 6 | Win | 6–0 | Richard De Jesus | TKO | 5 (6), 2:47 | Jun 17, 1993 | National Guard Armory, Philadelphia, Pennsylvania, U.S. | |
| 5 | Win | 5–0 | Robert Harris | TKO | 2 (?) | May 23, 1993 | Reading, Pennsylvania, U.S. | |
| 4 | Win | 4–0 | Dan Rucker | UD | 6 | Apr 22, 1993 | Paramount Theatre, New York City, New York, U.S. | |
| 3 | Win | 3–0 | Genaro Andujar | UD | 6 | Mar 13, 1993 | McCann Recreation Center, Poughkeepsie, Pennsylvania, U.S. | |
| 2 | Win | 2–0 | Antonio Pressley | KO | 1 (6), 2:38 | Oct 20, 1992 | Temple University McGonigle Hall, Philadelphia, Pennsylvania, U.S. | |
| 1 | Win | 1–0 | Pedro Cotto | TKO | 1 (4), 2:03 | Oct 20, 1992 | Merv Griffin's Resorts, Atlantic City, New Jersey, U.S. | |

Regional titles
| Vacant Title last held by John Lark | USBA Lightweight Champion; October 17, 1994 – July 1, 1997 | Succeeded by Israel Cardona |
| Vacant Title last held by Golden Johnson | NABF Lightweight Champion; September 3, 1999 – June 16, 2000 | Succeeded by Juan Lazcano |
Awards
| Previous: Vince Phillips KO10 Kostya Tszyu | The Ring Magazine Upset of the Year; W10 Arturo Gatti I 1998 | Next: Willy Wise W10 Julio César Chávez |
| Previous: Arturo Gatti KO5 Gabriel Ruelas | The Ring Magazine Fight of the Year; W10 Arturo Gatti I 1998 | Next: Paulie Ayala W12 Johnny Tapia |
