= The Ring magazine Comeback of the Year =

Comeback of the Year is an award given by American boxing magazine The Ring. Established in 1922, the award, based on the magazine's writers' criteria, is given to a boxer who has experienced a career resurgence or overcome adversity.

== 1980s ==
- 1980: Shoji Oguma
- 1981: Jimmy Young
- 1982: Bobby Chacon
- 1983: Roberto Durán
- 1984: Marvin Johnson
- 1985: Lupe Pintor
- 1986: Edwin Rosario
- 1987: Frankie Duarte
- 1988: Michael Dokes
- 1989: Roberto Durán

== 1990s ==
- 1990: Tony Lopez
- 1991: Vinny Pazienza
- 1992: Iran Barkley
- 1993: Zack Padilla
- 1994: George Foreman
- 1995: Azumah Nelson
- 1996: Danny Romero
- 1997: Vince Phillips
- 1998: Kostya Tszyu
- 1999: Michael Carbajal

== 2000s ==
- 2000: Virgil Hill
- 2001: John Michael Johnson
- 2002: Arturo Gatti
- 2003: James Toney
- 2004: Marco Antonio Barrera
- 2005: Ike Quartey
- 2006: Oleg Maskaev
- 2007: Paulie Malignaggi
- 2008: Vitali Klitschko
- 2009: Floyd Mayweather Jr.

== 2010s ==
- 2010: Bernard Hopkins
- 2011: Érik Morales
- 2012: Daniel Jacobs
- 2013: Manny Pacquiao
- 2014: Miguel Cotto
- 2015: Badou Jack
- 2016: Andre Ward
- 2017: Sadam Ali
- 2018: Tyson Fury
- 2019: Jamel Herring

== 2020s ==
- 2020: Román González
- 2021: Kiko Martínez
- 2022: Kenshiro Teraji
- 2023: Joseph Parker
- 2024: Billy Dib
- 2025: Not awarded
