= Oscar De La Hoya vs. Jesse James Leija =

Boxing match

Return to the Mecca
- Date: December 15, 1995
- Venue: Madison Square Garden, New York, New York, U.S.
- Title(s) on the line: WBO Lightweight title

Tale of the tape
Boxer	Oscar De La Hoya	Jesse James Leija
Nickname	The Golden Boy	The Texas Tornado
Hometown	East Los Angeles, California, U.S.	San Antonio, Texas, U.S.
Purse	$1,500,000	$350,000
Pre-fight record	19–0 (17 KO)	30–1–2 (14 KO)
Age	22 years, 10 months	29 years, 5 months
Height	5 ft 11 in (180 cm)	5 ft 5 in (165 cm)
Weight	135 lb (61 kg)	135 lb (61 kg)
Style	Orthodox	Orthodox
Recognition	WBO; Lightweight champion	Former WBC Super Featherweight champion

Result
- De La Hoya wins via 2nd-round corner retirement

Oscar De La Hoya vs. Jesse James Leija, billed as Return to the Mecca, was a professional boxing match contested on December 15, 1995, for the WBO lightweight title.

== Background ==
Almost immediately following his victory over Genaro Hernández, Oscar De La Hoya, the reigning WBO lightweight champion, would sign a deal with Madison Square Garden president Dave Checketts, who was in attendance for the Hernández fight, that would see De La Hoya make his next title defense against an yet-to-be-named opponent in the famed arena in what would be his New York City debut. De La Hoya had previously been scheduled to make his New York City debut at The Theater at Madison Square Garden in 1993, but he pulled out of his scheduled fight against Jose Vidal Concepcion citing "personal reasons" just three days before it was to happen. Leija was expected to be De La Hoya's final opponent as a lightweight. De La Hoya already had agreed to move up to the super lightweight division to face an opponent the following February in what was to be a tune-up fight prior to facing Julio César Chávez for the WBC super lightweight title.

Madison Square Garden officials originally pegged De La Hoya to face 2-division world champion and native New Yorker Tracy Harris Patterson, who then held the IBF junior lightweight title, but promoter Bob Arum deemed that Patterson was too light to face De La Hoya and replaced him with Jesse James Leija, a former WBC super featherweight champion who was moving up in weight to challenge De La Hoya. However, Patterson's agent Marc Roberts opinioned that De La Hoya had actually "decided to duck" Patterson. Patterson. Instead, Patterson was featured on the main undercard bout, defending his junior lightweight title against challenger Arturo Gatti. Patterson's stepfather and former manager, two-time heavyweight champion Floyd Patterson served as the chairman of the New York State Athletic Commission and was an integral part of bringing the event to Madison Square Garden but opted not to attend the press conference announcing the event as a result of a rift with his stepson. The Return to the Mecca card was the first major boxing event to take place in Madison Square Garden since the Buddy McGirt vs. Pernell Whitaker fight in March 1993 and was part of a concerted effort betwee the arena and HBO to bring boxing back the venue more frequently.

Leija's trainer Richie Giachetti expressed dissatisfaction with the New York State Athletic Commission appointing Ron Lipton to referee the fight, claiming that Lipton would unfairly favor De La Hoya and vowed to protest the fight should Leija lose by a decision stating "If there's a knockout, then it doesn't matter. But if it comes to a decision, I don't want it influenced by a referee that allows one fighter to do things to another guy."

== The fight ==
Fighting largely tactically, De La Hoya used his superior height and reach to his advantage as Leija threw punches constantly through two rounds but struggled to get inside of De La Hoya or land many punches. With 50 seconds remaining in the second round, De La Hoya landed a left hook that dropped Leija to his knees, where he remained until getting up at the count of nine. Looking to end the fight, De La Hoya then attacked Leija relentlessly, who was on slightly wobbly legs, dropping him again with a left hook just as round ended. Leija would again get back up at the count of nine, but at the insistence of Leija's trainer Giachetti, the fight was stopped.

== Aftermath ==
It was not immediately known if referee Ron Lipton had counted Leija out or if he had felt Leija could not continue and stopped the fight himself. Confused, HBO commentators Jim Lampley, George Foreman Larry Merchant and Harold Lederman argued amongst themselves whether Lipton had stopped the fight or Leija had been counter out. However, Giachetti confirmed in a post-fight interview with Merchant that it had been his decision to stop the fight.

== Fight card ==
Confirmed bouts:

Weight Class	Weight		vs.		Method	Round	Notes
Lightweight	135 lbs.	Oscar De La Hoya (c)	def.	Jesse James Leija	RTD	2/12	^{note 1}
Super Featherweight	130 lbs.	Arturo Gatti	def.	Tracy Harris Patterson (c)	UD	12/12	^{note 2}
Super Lightweight	140 lbs.	Antonio Rivera	def.	Gerald Gray	TKO	9/10
Heavyweight	200+ lbs.	Shannon Briggs	def.	Calvin Jones	TKO	1/10
Heavyweight	200+ lbs.	Mitchell Rose	def.	Eric Esch	TKO	2/4

^Note 1 For WBO Lightweight title
^Note 2 For IBF Super Featherweight title

== Broadcasting ==
Country	Broadcaster
United States	HBO

Preceded by vs. Genaro Hernández	Oscar De La Hoya's bouts 15 December 1995	Succeeded by vs. Darryl Tyson
Preceded by vs. Rodney Garnett	Jesse James Leija's bouts 15 December 1995	Succeeded by vs. Azumah Nelson
