= Gabriel Ruelas =

Mexican boxer (born 1970)

Personal information
- Born: July 23, 1970 (age 56) Mascota, Jalisco, Mexico
- Height: 5 ft 7 in (170 cm)
- Weight: Super featherweight

Boxing career
- Reach: 69 in (175 cm)
- Stance: Orthodox

Boxing record
- Total fights: 56
- Wins: 49
- Win by KO: 24
- Losses: 7

Gabriel Ruelas (born July 23, 1970, in Yerbabuena, Jalisco, Mexico) is a Mexican former professional boxer who held the WBC super featherweight world championship from 1994 to 1995.

== Professional career ==
Ruelas turned pro in 1988 and in 1993 challenged WBC super featherweight world title holder Azumah Nelson, losing a close majority decision. In 1994 he was able to capture the title by outpointing Jesse James Leija. He defended the belt twice, including an 11th-round TKO of Jimmy Garcia of Colombia, who later died from his injuries. Ruelas contemplated retirement after Garcia's death, however, he decided to continue, promising to donate some of his earnings to the Garcia family. Ruelas later reflected that he was never the same fighter following that incident. His fight with Garcia was an undercard to his brother's (Rafael Ruelas) lost title fight with Oscar De La Hoya. Ruelas lost his title in a rematch to Nelson in 1995, via TKO in the 5th. In 1997 he took on hard-hitting Arturo Gatti for the IBF super featherweight world title but was TKO'd in the 5th. The fifth round of this bout was chosen as The Ring magazine Round of the Year for 1997. The fight itself was also named "Fight of the Year" by the same magazine.

Ruelas retired in 2003 after losing to Courtney Burton. Gabriel's brother, Rafael (also a professional boxer) and relative Guillermo U. Ruelas, all attended Poly Technic High School in Sun Valley, California.

== Professional boxing record ==
56 fights	49 wins	7 losses
By knockout	24	5
By decision	25	2

No.	Result	Record	Opponent	Type	Round, time	Date	Location	Notes
56	Loss	49–7	Courtney Burton	TKO	8 (10)	2003-03-24	Cajundome, Lafayette, Louisiana, U.S.	
55	Win	49–6	Gene Vassar	UD	6 (6)	2002-06-28	Farm Bureau Building, Indianapolis, Indiana, U.S.	
54	Win	48–6	Lee Cargle	UD	6 (6)	2002-05-22	Ameristar Casino, Kansas City, Missouri, U.S.	
53	Win	47–6	Pedro Garcia	UD	8 (8)	2001-03-11	Feather Falls Casino, Oroville, California, U.S.	
52	Loss	46–6	Manuel Garnica	MD	10 (10)	1999-10-03	Lady Luck Casino, Lula, Mississippi, U.S.	
51	Win	46–5	Jose Alfonso Rodriguez	UD	10 (10)	1999-08-07	Miccosukee Resort & Gaming, Miami, Florida, U.S.	
50	Loss	45–5	John Brown	TKO	8 (10)	1998-10-24	Trump Taj Mahal, Atlantic City, New Jersey, U.S.	
49	Win	45–4	Troy Dorsey	TKO	6 (12)	1998-07-11	Alamodome, San Antonio, Texas, U.S.	For IBA Intercontinental lightweight title
48	Loss	44–4	Arturo Gatti	TKO	5 (12)	1997-10-04	Caesars Atlantic City, Atlantic City, New Jersey, U.S.	For IBF super featherweight title
47	Win	44–3	James Crayton	UD	10 (10)	1997-02-14	Fantasy Springs Resort Casino, Indio, California, U.S.	
46	Win	43–3	Angelo Nunez	TD	8 (10)	1996-09-16	Arizona Charlie's, Las Vegas, Nevada, U.S.	
45	Win	42–3	Julio Cesar Herrera	UD	10 (10)	1996-03-13	Grand Olympic Auditorium, Los Angeles, California, U.S.	
44	Loss	41–3	Azumah Nelson	TKO	5 (12)	1995-12-01	Fantasy Springs Resort Casino, Indio, California, U.S.	Lost WBC super featherweight title
43	Win	41–2	Jimmy Garcia	TKO	11 (12)	1995-05-06	Caesars Palace, Paradise, Nevada, U.S.	Retained WBC super featherweight title
42	Win	40–2	Freddie Liberatore	RTD	2 (12)	1995-01-28	MGM Grand Garden Arena, Las Vegas, Nevada, U.S.	Retained WBC super featherweight title
41	Win	39–2	Jesse James Leija	UD	12 (12)	17 Sep 1994	MGM Grand Garden Arena, Las Vegas, Nevada, U.S.	Won WBC super featherweight title
40	Win	38–2	Paris Alexander	TKO	7 (10)	1994-05-20	Grand Olympic Auditorium, Los Angeles, California, U.S.	
39	Win	37–2	Raul Hernandez	TKO	7 (10)	1994-02-08	Country Club, Reseda, California, U.S.	
38	Win	36–2	Eduardo Jacques	KO	7 (10)	1994-01-21	Foxwoods Resort Casino, Ledyard, Connecticut, U.S.	
37	Win	35–2	Mike Grow	TKO	8 (10)	1993-10-22	Boise State Pavilion, Boise, Idaho, U.S.	
36	Win	34–2	Ben Lopez	TKO	5 (10)	1993-08-28	Great Western Forum, Inglewood, California, U.S.	
35	Loss	33–2	Azumah Nelson	MD	12 (12)	Feb 20, 1993	Estadio Azteca, Mexico City, Distrito Federal, Mexico	For WBC super featherweight title
34	Win	33–1	Gabriel Castro	UD	10 (10)	1992-09-29	Country Club, Reseda, California, U.S.	
33	Win	32–1	Ismael Diaz	UD	10 (10)	1992-08-25	Country Club, Reseda, California, U.S.	
32	Win	31–1	Ditau Paul Molefyane	MD	10 (10)	1992-06-27	Country Club, Reseda, California, U.S.	
31	Win	30–1	Raymundo Arce	TKO	7 (10)	1992-05-26	Country Club, Reseda, California, U.S.	
30	Win	29–1	Moises Martinez	TKO	1 (10)	1992-04-02	Reno-Sparks Convention Center, Reno, Nevada, U.S.	
29	Win	28–1	Tomas Valdez	UD	8 (8)	1992-02-22	Sports Arena, San Diego, California, U.S.	
28	Win	27–1	Jorge Palomares	UD	12 (12)	1992-01-30	Country Club, Reseda, California, U.S.	Retained NABF super featherweight title
27	Win	26–1	Ascencion Lugo	KO	1 (10)	1991-11-26	Country Club, Reseda, California, U.S.	
26	Win	25–1	Alvaro Bohorquez	UD	12 (12)	1991-08-17	Sports Arena, San Diego, California, U.S.	Retained NABF super featherweight title
25	Win	24–1	Aaron Lopez	UD	12 (12)	1991-07-31	Country Club, Reseda, California, U.S.	For vacant NABF super featherweight title
24	Win	23–1	Eduardo Montoya	KO	1 (10)	1991-06-25	Country Club, Reseda, California, U.S.	
23	Win	22–1	Pedro Mendoza	UD	10 (10)	1991-06-01	Radisson Resort, Palm Springs, California, U.S.	
22	Loss	21–1	Jeff Franklin	TKO	7 (10)	1990-04-14	The Mirage, Las Vegas, Nevada, U.S.	
21	Win	21–0	Leonardo Moreno	UD	6 (6)	1990-03-08	Great Western Forum, Inglewood, California, U.S.	
20	Win	20–0	Dana Roston	KO	3 (10)	1990-02-27	Country Club, Reseda, California, U.S.	
19	Win	19–0	Arturo Hernandez	TKO	3 (6)	1990-02-05	Great Western Forum, Inglewood, California, U.S.	
18	Win	18–0	Javier Macias	KO	2 (8)	1989-11-28	Country Club, Reseda, California, U.S.	
17	Win	17–0	Freddie Santos	UD	6 (6)	1989-10-24	Country Club, Reseda, California, U.S.	
16	Win	16–0	Fred Hernandez	UD	8 (8)	1989-09-26	Country Club, Reseda, California, U.S.	
15	Win	15–0	Abe Castro	KO	4 (?)	1989-08-29	Country Club, Reseda, California, U.S.	
14	Win	14–0	Randy Reedy	UD	6 (6)	1989-07-14	Riviera Club, Chicago, Illinois, U.S.	
13	Win	13–0	Francisco Pascasio	TKO	5 (6)	1989-06-27	Country Club, Reseda, California, U.S.	
12	Win	12–0	Antonio Marin	KO	1 (?)	1989-06-16	Sam Houston Coliseum, Houston, Texas, U.S.	
11	Win	11–0	Jorge Rodriguez	UD	6 (6)	1989-05-30	Country Club, Reseda, California, U.S.	
10	Win	10–0	Mario Lozano	UD	4 (4)	1989-04-25	Showboat Hotel and Casino, Las Vegas, Nevada, U.S.	
9	Win	9–0	Josefino Suarez	UD	4 (4)	1989-03-28	Showboat Hotel and Casino, Las Vegas, Nevada, U.S.	
8	Win	8–0	Vicente Arias	TKO	1 (4)	1989-02-14	Showboat Hotel and Casino, Atlantic City, New Jersey, U.S.	
7	Win	7–0	Martin Urias	TKO	2 (4)	1989-01-17	Caesars Palace, Paradise, Nevada, U.S.	
6	Win	6–0	Alberto Almaguer	KO	1 (4)	1988-12-09	Caesars Palace, Sports Pavilion, Paradise, Nevada, U.S.	
5	Win	5–0	Juvenal Molina	UD	6 (6)	1988-11-29	Country Club, Reseda, California, U.S.	
4	Win	4–0	Willie Garcia	KO	1 (4)	1988-11-15	El Cortez Hotel, San Diego, California, U.S.	
3	Win	3–0	Jaime Morales	KO	1 (?)	1988-10-14	Caesars Palace, Sports Pavilion, Paradise, Nevada, U.S.	
2	Win	2–0	Tranquilino Martinez	UD	4 (4)	1988-09-27	Country Club, Reseda, California, U.S.	
1	Win	1–0	Raul Martinez	TKO	1 (4)	1988-09-16	Caesars Palace, Paradise, Nevada, U.S.	

== Honours ==
- 2006 California Boxing Hall of Fame Inductee.

== See also ==
- Notable boxing families
- List of Mexican boxing world champions
- List of world super-featherweight boxing champions
- WBC Legends of Boxing Museum

Sporting positions
Regional boxing titles
Vacant Title last held by Juan Laporte	NABF super featherweight champion July 31, 1991 – 1992; Vacated	Vacant Title next held by Narciso Valenzuela Romo
World boxing titles
Preceded by Jesse James Leija	WBC super featherweight champion September 17, 1994 – December 1, 1995	Succeeded by Azumah Nelson
Awards
Previous: Frankie Liles vs. Tim Littles; Round 3	The Ring magazine Round of the Year vs. Arturo Gatti; Round 5; 1997	Next: Ivan Robinson vs. Arturo Gatti II; Round 3
