= Jimmy García =

Colombian boxer (1971–1995)

Jimmy Garcia
Personal information
- Nationality: (Colombia) Colombian
- Born: James Garcia; October 12, 1971 Barranquilla, Colombia
- Died: May 19, 1995 (aged 23)
- Weight: Featherweight

Boxing career
- Stance: Orthodox

Boxing record
- Total fights: 40
- Wins: 35
- Win by KO: 25
- Losses: 5

Jimmy Garcia (October 12, 1971 – May 19, 1995) was a Colombian boxer who was best known for losing a WBC super featherweight title to Gabriel Ruelas and subsequently dying 13 days later from brain damage. The loss to Ruelas was the only stoppage loss of Garcia's career, and the former Colombian Featherweight champion's corner was criticized for not stopping the fight earlier. The Ruelas match had been Garcia's second unsuccessful title shot, having lost a unanimous decision to Genaro Hernández earlier.

== Professional boxing record ==
40 fights	35 wins	5 losses
By knockout	25	1
By decision	10	4
Draws	0	

No.	Result	Record	Opponent	Type	Round, time	Date	Location	Notes
40	Loss	35-5	(Mexico) Gabriel Ruelas	TKO		May 6, 1995	Caesars Palace, Las Vegas, United States	For WBC lightweight title
39	Loss	35-4	(United States) Genaro Hernández	UD	12	Nov 12, 1994	Plaza de Toros, Mexico City, Mexico	For WBO lightweight title
38	Win	35-3	Gustavo Mena					
37	Win	34-3	Edgar Orlando Ballen					
36	Win	33-3						
35	Win	32-3						
34	Win	31-3						
33	Win	30-3						
32	Win	29-3						
31	Win	28-3						
30	Win	27-3						
29	Win	26-3						
28	Win	25-3						
27	Win	24-3						
26	Win	23-3						
25	Win	22-3						
24	Win	21-3						
23	Win	20-3						
22	Loss	19-3						
21	Win	19-2						
20	Loss	18-2						
19	Win	18-1						
18	Win	17-1						
17	Win	16-1						
16	Win	15-1						
15	Loss	14-1						
14	Win	14-0						
13	Win	13-0						
12	Win	12-0						
11	Win	11-0						
10	Win	10-0						
9	Win	9-0						
8	Win	8-0						
7	Win	7-0						
6	Win	6-0						
5	Win	5-0						
4	Win	4-0						
3	Win	3-0						
2	Win	2-0						
1	Win	1-0						
