= Johnny Montantes =

American boxer

Johnny Montantes, alias Jumpin' Johnny, (June 10, 1969 – September 28, 1997) was a lightweight professional boxer from Minnesota.

== Personal life ==
Montantes was from Saint Paul, Minnesota. He named his son "Marciano" in honor of heavyweight great Rocky Marciano.

== Professional career ==
Montantes' career began in 1990 with a win against Norberto Riviera followed by a loss to Jose Vilarino. There was initially no hint of the success to come. However, following the loss to Vilarino, Montantes put together a string of 22 straight wins against ever-improving competition. His last two fights were losses to well-known fighters Acelino Freitas and James Crayton. His final record was 28 wins (22 by knockout) and 4 losses.

== Death ==
On the night of September 26, 1997, Montantes was fighting James Crayton in Las Vegas, Nevada. Knocked out violently in the fifth round, Montantes suffered a brain injury and never regained consciousness. Doctors removed him from life support two days later.
