= Eric Crumble =

American boxer (born 1966)

Personal information
- Nationality: American
- Born: James Eric Crumble; December 10, 1966 (age 59)
- Weight: Super middleweight

Boxing career
- Stance: Orthodox

Boxing record
- Total fights: 32
- Wins: 0
- Losses: 31
- No contests: 1

Eric Crumble (born December 10, 1966) is an American former boxer, and notably one of the sport's most prolific in terms of consistent losses. Since his professional debut on June 22, 1990, Crumble has participated in 32 fights and has lost every one with the exception of a no contest in 1994. Additionally, all of his losses have occurred via knockout in either the first or second round.

In thirteen years of boxing, Crumble has fought in six weight classes, with his most notable opponents being Angel Manfredy in 1993 and Antwun Echols in 1996, both of whom went on to win regional and national championships, including challenging for world championships. Boxing amateur Toreano Nichols knocked him out in his last exhibition match shortly before retiring.

Crumble resides in Milwaukee, Wisconsin.

== Professional boxing record ==
| 32 fights | 0 wins | 31 losses |
|---|---|---|
| By knockout | 0 | 31 |
| By decision | 0 | 0 |
| No contests | 1 | |

| No. | Result | Record | Opponent | Type | Round | Date | Location |
|---|---|---|---|---|---|---|---|
| 32 | Loss | 0–31 (1) | Matt Gockel | TKO | 1 (4) | Sep 19, 2003 | Coyote's, Lawrence |
| 31 | Loss | 0–30 (1) | Mike Stone | TKO | 1 (4) | Feb 22, 2003 | Shooting Star Casino, Mahnomen |
| 30 | Loss | 0–29 (1) | Nick Farrow | TKO | 1 (4) | Nov 16, 2002 | St. Paul Armory, Saint Paul |
| 29 | Loss | 0-28 (1) | Mike Stone | KO | 1 (4) | Mar 26, 2002 | 8 Second Saloon, Indianapolis |
| 28 | Loss | 0–27 (1) | Hector Brito | TKO | 1 (?) | Nov 1, 2001 | Green Bay |
| 27 | Loss | 0–26 (1) | Alberto Mercedes | TKO | 1 (?) | Sep 22, 2001 | Unknown |
| 26 | Loss | 0–25 (1) | Billy Tibbs | TKO | 1 (4) | Jul 12, 2001 | Ramada Marlborough Hotel, Winnipeg |
| 25 | Loss | 0–24 (1) | Hosea Smith | TKO | 2 (?) | May 11, 2001 | North Star Casino, Keshena |
| 24 | Loss | 0–23 (1) | Frank LaBuguen | TKO | 2 (4) | Jan 19, 2001 | North Star Casino, Keshena |
| 23 | Loss | 0–22 (1) | Marnix Stamps | TKO | 2 (4) | Nov 2, 2000 | ShopKo Hall, Green Bay |
| 22 | Loss | 0–21 (1) | Frank LaBuguen | TKO | 1 (?) | Oct 6, 2000 | Janesville |
| 21 | Loss | 0–20 (1) | Ruben Ruiz | KO | 1 (4) | Apr 25, 2000 | Veteran's Coliseum, Cedar Rapids |
| 20 | Loss | 0–19 (1) | Donnie Penelton | TKO | 2 (4) | Feb 25, 2000 | Veteran's Coliseum, Cedar Rapids |
| 19 | Loss | 0–18 (1) | Jamie Voyles | KO | 2 (4) | Dec 14, 1999 | 8 Second Saloon, Indianapolis |
| 18 | Loss | 0–17 (1) | Tipton Walker | KO | 1 (4) | Oct 29, 1999 | Civic Center, La Porte |
| 17 | Loss | 0–16 (1) | James Pointer | KO | 1 (4) | Mar 26, 1998 | Banana Joe's, Chicago |
| 16 | Loss | 0–15 (1) | Carmelo Negron | TKO | 1 (8) | Jun 27, 1997 | Midlane Civic Center, Wadsworth |
| 15 | Loss | 0–14 (1) | Bobby Butters | TKO | 1 (?) | May 6, 1997 | Treasure Island Casino, Red Wing |
| 14 | Loss | 0–13 (1) | Mike Jankovich | TKO | 1 (4) | Mar 19, 1997 | Civic Center, Hammond |
| 13 | Loss | 0–12 (1) | Ralph Jones | TKO | 2 (8) | Feb 19, 1997 | Columbia Club, Indianapolis |
| 12 | Loss | 0–11 (1) | Jorge Manjarrez | TKO | 1 (4) | Nov 29, 1996 | Sullivan Brothers Center, Waterloo |
| 11 | Loss | 0–10 (1) | Jack Hernandez | TKO | 2 (4) | Jul 14, 1996 | Lady Luck Casino, Davenport |
| 10 | Loss | 0–9 (1) | Antwun Echols | TKO | 1 (6) | Mar 30, 1996 | Sullivan Brothers Center, Waterloo |
| 9 | Loss | 0–8 (1) | Roddy Batson | KO | 1 (6) | Dec 14, 1995 | Convention Centre, Winnipeg |
| 8 | Loss | 0–7 (1) | Bruce Rumbolz | KO | 1 (?) | Jul 14, 1995 | South Beloit |
| 7 | Loss | 0–6 (1) | Randy Handshoe | KO | 2 (6) | May 25, 1995 | Civic Center, Hammond |
| 6 | Loss | 0–5 (1) | Rick Camlin | TKO | 2 (6) | Mar 25, 1995 | Sterling |
| 5 | Loss | 0–4 (1) | Mike Jankovich | KO | 2 (?) | Nov 23, 1994 | Rosemont |
| 4 | NC | 0–3 (1) | Rick Lanas | NC | 1 (?) | Sep 13, 1994 | Chicago |
| 3 | Loss | 0–3 | John Vanham | KO | 1 (4) | Jul 25, 1994 | Rialto, Joliet |
| 2 | Loss | 0–2 | Angel Manfredy | KO | 1 (?) | Sep 3, 1993 | Gary |
| 1 | Loss | 0–1 | John Borman | KO | 2 (4) | Jun 22, 1990 | Civic Center, Lansing |
