= Arturo Gatti =

Canadian boxer (1972–2009)

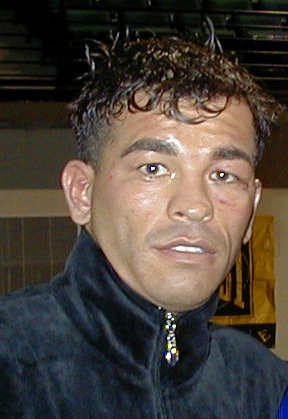
- Gatti in 2002

Personal information
- Nickname: Thunder
- Born: April 15, 1972 Cassino, Italy
- Died: July 11, 2009 (aged 37) Ipojuca, Brazil
- Height: 5 ft 8 in (173 cm)
- Weight: Super featherweight; Light welterweight; Welterweight

Boxing career
- Reach: 68 in (173 cm)
- Stance: Orthodox

Boxing record
- Total fights: 49
- Wins: 40
- Win by KO: 31
- Losses: 9

Arturo Gatti (April 15, 1972 – July 11, 2009) was a Canadian professional boxer who competed from 1991 to 2007. He was a world champion in two weight classes, having held the International Boxing Federation (IBF) junior lightweight title from 1995 to 1998, and the World Boxing Council (WBC) super lightweight title from 2004 to 2005. He also participated in The Ring magazine's Fight of the Year a total of four times (1997, 1998, 2002, and 2003). He announced his retirement on July 14, 2007. After his death in 2009, Gatti was inducted into the International Boxing Hall of Fame on December 10, 2012, in his first year of eligibility, becoming the tenth Canadian boxer to be so inducted.

Gatti was born in Cassino, Italy, and raised in Montreal, Canada. He is the younger brother of ex-professional boxer Joe Gatti. Gatti eventually relocated to Jersey City, New Jersey, as a teenager where he found a manager he trusted and decided to turn pro. He returned to Montreal after retiring from boxing to work in real estate.

He died under mysterious circumstances in 2009. His Brazilian wife was arrested for his homicide, then released after an autopsy done in Brazil ruled his death was a suicide. Subsequent American and Canadian investigations could not agree on Gatti's cause of death and discovered a history of suicidal ideation. In October 2025, his son, Arturo Gatti Jr., also died by suicide by hanging at age 17.

== Amateur career ==
Growing up in Canada, Gatti had a decorated amateur career, winning two national junior championships as well as winning three Canadian Golden Gloves tournaments in three different weight categories. In 1986, he qualified for the International Youth Tournament but lost to Irish representative Wayne McCulloch. In 1990, Gatti joined the Canadian national team. That October, he competed in the World Youth Championship in Lima but was eliminated in the first round by a boxer from Puerto Rico. He finished his amateur career with a record of 86–14.

== Professional career ==
Arturo Gatti was a member of the Canadian National team, and was training to represent Canada at the 1992 Summer Games, but in 1991, at age 19, he decided to turn pro instead. He began boxing professionally on the night of June 10, 1991, with a third-round knockout of Jose Gonzalez in Secaucus, New Jersey. He went undefeated for six bouts before losing to King Solomon by split decision in six rounds on November 17, 1992.

His next fight, on March 24, 1993, was his first fight abroad, where he visited Amsterdam, Netherlands, and knocked out Plawen Goutchev in round one.

In 1994, he beat Leon Bostic, and followed through with a Round 1 knockout over Pete Taliaferro to win the USBA super featherweight title. He retained the title against Richard Salazar and former world champion Jose Sanabria.

=== Signing with HBO ===
On December 15, 1995, Gatti challenged the IBF super featherweight Champion Tracy Harris Patterson, Floyd Patterson's adoptive son. Gatti became world champion when he outpointed Patterson (scoring: 116–111, 115–112, 114–113) and signed a multi-fight deal with HBO to fight on HBO Boxing.

He only had two fights in 1996, once defending his world title. His title defense, at Madison Square Garden against Dominican Wilson Rodriguez was the first of three Gatti fights in a row to be named a candidate for "Fight of the Year" by The Ring. Dropped in round two and with his right eye closing fast, Gatti knocked Rodriguez down in round five with a left hook to the body, before finishing him off in round six to retain the title.

In 1997, he again won a points victory over Patterson, but this time by a larger margin (118–108, 117–109, 116–110). He then scored a technical knockout over former world champion Calvin Grove in the seventh round of a non-title affair. Then came his defense against former world champion Gabriel Ruelas, which was also named "Fight of the Year" by The Ring. Rocked by a left uppercut in the fourth, Gatti absorbed more than 15 consecutive punches before being saved by the bell. In the fifth, with Ruelas again the aggressor and looking close to victory, Gatti connected with a left hook that lifted Ruelas off the canvas and resulted in the knock out. His knockout over Ruelas was later awarded The Ring Knockout of the Year.

=== To the lightweight division ===
After that fight, Gatti relinquished the world title, going up in weight to the lightweight division. However, 1998 was a bad year for him, as he lost all three of his fights that year. He lost by a technical knockout in round eight to Angel Manfredy, and then lost a pair of close 10-round decisions to Ivan Robinson, the first by split decision, the second by unanimous. In Gatti–Robinson II, Gatti had a point deducted in the eighth round for low blows. Had the point not been deducted, the fight would have been a draw, as Robinson was ahead by only one point on two scorecards. Gatti–Robinson I was chosen "Fight of the Year" by The Ring, thus marking the second year in a row that a Gatti fight was given that award and the third year in a row a Gatti fight was nominated.

He only had one fight in 1999, knocking out Reyes Munoz in round one.

=== Controversial fight against Gamache ===
Gatti's first fight of 2000 proved to be controversial. Faced with former world champion Joey Gamache, Gatti won by a knockout in round two. A subsequent lawsuit by Gamache's handlers claimed Gatti had gained 19 pounds since the weigh-in the day before and thus had a large advantage over Gamache. In the wake of the fight, boxing regulators pushed for a new law limiting the amount of weight a competitor can gain between the weigh-in and time of the fight. Gatti was also accused by Gamache's handlers of not having actually made the contracted weight of 141 pounds. After Gatti–Gamache, some boxing commissions started weighing boxers a second time.

Gatti also won his two other fights that year, against Eric Jukabuwski and Joe Hutchinson.

=== Fight against De La Hoya and trilogy against Micky Ward ===
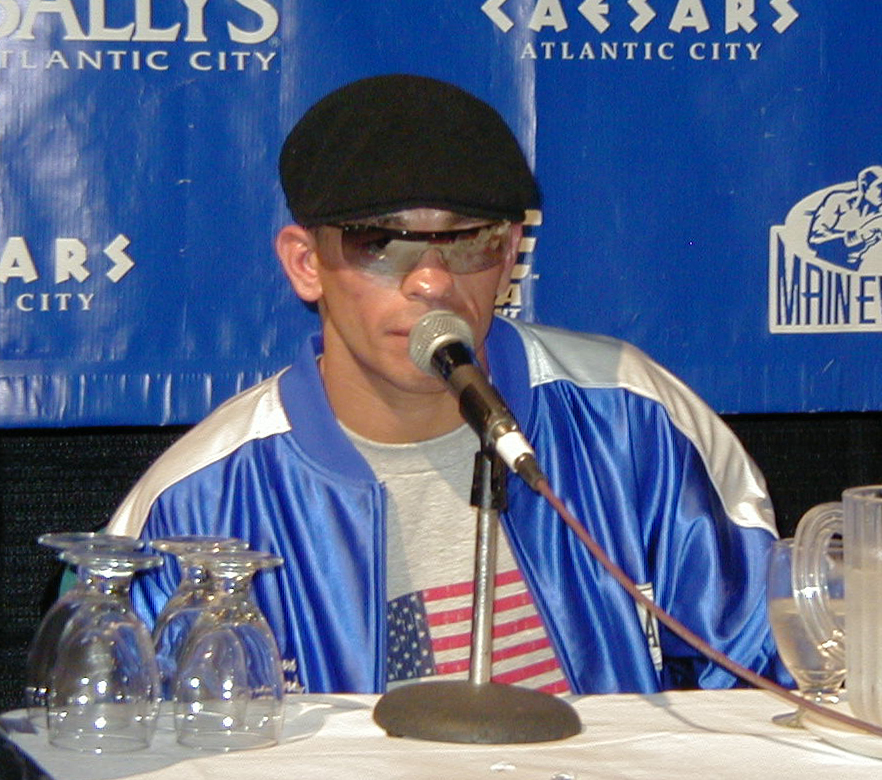
Gatti at the post-fight press conference on June 7, 2003

In 2001, Gatti only had one fight, going up in weight to meet welterweight Oscar De La Hoya, who beat him by a technical knockout in five rounds. In 2002, Gatti returned to the light welterweight division and defeated former world champion Terronn Millett by a knockout in round four.

He then split two ten-round decisions with "Irish" Micky Ward, losing their first bout, but winning their second. Gatti-Ward I also earned "Fight of the Year" honors by Ring Magazine, and the 9th round was called the Round of the Century by Emanuel Steward.

Gatti's first bout against Ward is viewed as one of the greatest in boxing history by writers and fans alike. It has since been referred to as the “fight of the century” and won both The Ring Magazines fight of the year and the BWAA Fight of the Year. Gatti was also awarded The Ring Magazine Comeback of the Year for his career resurgence in 2002.

On June 7, 2003, he and Ward had a rubber match. Gatti broke his twice-repaired right hand when he struck Ward's hip bone with an attempted body shot in the fourth, and he dropped his arm. In the sixth, Gatti dominated the round, but got caught with an overhand to the top of the head a second before the bell rang and went down. Gatti would win the match by unanimous decision. The third fight between the two was again named "Fight of the Year" by Ring Magazine.

Gatti vs Ward I & III are also part of HBO's 10 best fights of the decade. The trilogy is often regarded as one of the greatest in all of boxing.

=== Career after Micky Ward ===
On January 24, 2004, Gatti, having recovered from a broken hand, scored a tenth round knock-down and defeated Gianluca Branco of Italy by a 12-round unanimous decision to win the vacant WBC light welterweight title.

On July 24, 2004, he knocked out the previously unbeaten former world champion Leonard Dorin Doroftei in two rounds at Atlantic City, to retain his title.

Gatti's second defense of his WBC title came against former WBC super featherweight Champion Jesse James Leija on January 29, 2005. Gatti beat Leija by a fifth-round knockout. Gatti's protege, Danny "Little Mac" McDermott made his professional debut on the undercard with a victory over Alex Matos.

In his next fight, Gatti fought former super featherweight and lightweight world champion Floyd Mayweather Jr. on June 25, 2005. He took a horrific beating and Gatti's corner man threw in the towel after he was beaten around the ring, thus ending his title reign via sixth-round technical knockout.

After the loss to Mayweather, Gatti moved up to the welterweight division. He beat Thomas Damgaard on January 28, 2006, by an eleventh-round technical knockout to win the vacant IBA welterweight title and become a champion in 3 different weight divisions.

On July 22, 2006, Gatti lost by a TKO to Carlos Baldomir, vying for the WBC & The Ring welterweight championship. He then broke off his relationship with Buddy McGirt and had a new trainer in Micky Ward.

=== Final fight and retirement ===
Gatti attempted a comeback on July 14, 2007, against Alfonso Gomez, only to get TKO'd by Gomez. After the fight, Gatti announced his retirement in the dressing room, reportedly quipping: "I'm coming back — as a spectator."

Gatti retired with a record of 40 wins and 9 losses, with 31 wins by knockout. On September 24, 2008, reports had surfaced that Gatti was considering a comeback against Montreal welterweight Antonin Décarie, the Canadian and North American Boxing Organization champion. On December 10, 2012, he was voted into the International Boxing Hall of Fame.

== Fighting style ==
Arturo was an aggressive, all-action fighter, often remembered as a slugger. Early on in his career, Gatti showed his tremendous punching power as he amassed a large number of first-round knockouts. Although he had the ability to box many opponents (as shown in the second Micky Ward fight) Gatti would often get into brawls when his opponents were able to take the power and fight back. This is why many of his bouts against good opposition were slug-fests.

Gatti had a very good chin, shown in the majority of his major fights. He was able to absorb large amounts of punishment by fighters such as Wilson Rodriguez, Gabriel Ruelas, Angel Manfredy, Ivan Robinson, Oscar De La Hoya, Micky Ward, Floyd Mayweather and Carlos Baldomir, none of whom could knock him out cold. In his first title defence against Wilson Rodriguez at Madison Square Garden he showed off his recuperative abilities as he was close to being stopped under a barrage of shots and in the next round he stopped his opponent.

Even though he was often described as a slugger and a "brawler," Gatti also possessed good boxing skills, including a strong jab and the ability to box off his back foot.

Due to Gatti's entertaining style he earned the nickname “The Human Highlight Reel.”

Oscar De La Hoya, who faced many big punchers from 130 pounds to 160 pounds, says Gatti hit him the hardest out of any fighter.

== Death ==
On July 11, 2009, Gatti was found dead in a hotel in Ipojuca, Pernambuco, Brazil, where he was on holiday with his Brazilian wife, Amanda Rodrigues, and their 10-month-old son. He was 37 years old. Gatti's wife was initially charged with murder after Brazilian authorities ruled Gatti's death a homicide, but after the coroner's autopsy report was released, they declared it was a suicide by hanging, and charges against his widow were dropped. Gatti had a history of suicidal threats and had previously attempted suicide in 2006.

Gatti's funeral was held on July 20, 2009; about 1,000 mourners filed into Our Lady of Defence Church in Montreal's Little Italy, and he was buried in a crypt in Laval Cemetery in Quebec. The WBC also presented Gatti's mother with a posthumous championship belt. There were many other tributes made by members of the boxing world in Gatti's honor, along with a public memorial in New Jersey.

On July 31, 2009, it was announced that the Canadian government would be seeking more information from the Brazilian authorities on Gatti's death. Gatti's family confirmed that there would be a second autopsy done in Quebec.

Two independent investigators hired by Gatti's longtime manager Pat Lynch released a statement in September 2011 that they believed Gatti was murdered. A contributing factor to their conclusion was an injury to the back of Gatti's head that they believed could not have been self inflicted. After receiving the independent investigators' findings, Brazilian authorities again concluded that Gatti died by suicide.

At the family's request, a Quebec coroner agreed to exhume the body so that two pathologists could conduct a second autopsy. After an autopsy, the pathologists ruled there was "no clear evidence of foul play" and expressed doubt at the conclusions reached by the private investigators hired by Gatti's manager. CBC's The Fifth Estate and HBO's Real Sports with Bryant Gumbel both interviewed witnesses who stated Gatti assaulted his wife in public the night before his death and that the injuries to the back of his head came as result of Gatti fighting with a passer-by who attempted to intervene.

== Titles in boxing ==
=== Major world titles ===
- IBF junior lightweight champion (130 pounds)
- WBC super lightweight champion (140 pounds)

=== Minor world titles ===
- IBA welterweight champion (140 pounds)

=== Regional titles ===
- USBA junior lightweight champion (130 pounds)

== Awards and achievements ==
Fights of the year

- 1997 The Ring Fight of the Year vs. Gabriel Ruelas
- 1998 The Ring Fight of the Year vs. Ivan Robinson
- 2002 The Ring Fight of the Year vs. Micky Ward
- 2002 BWAA Fight of the Year vs. Micky Ward
- 2003 The Ring Fight of the Year vs. Micky Ward III

Other awards

- Inducted into the New Jersey Boxing Hall of Fame in 1996.
- 1997 The Ring Knockout of the Year vs. Gabriel Ruelas
- 2002 The Ring Comeback of the Year
- 2002 The Ring magazine Round of the Year Round 9 vs. Micky Ward
- 2002 USA Today's Round of the year Round 9 vs. Micky Ward
- Inducted into the National Italian American Sports Hall of Fame in 2006.
- Inducted into International Boxing Hall of Fame on December 10, 2012, in his first year of eligibility.
- Inducted into the Connecticut Boxing Hall of Fame in 2019.
- Inducted into the National Boxing Hall of Fame in 2024.

== Personal life ==
Gatti was born in Italy and his family is of Italian ancestry. His family shortly relocated to Montreal, Quebec, where he was raised and fought his entire amateur career. He later relocated to New Jersey as a teenager to begin his professional career. His brother, Joe, was also a professional boxer.

During the 2000s Gatti was in a relationship with Erika Rivera who he met in New Jersey they had one daughter together named Sophia who was born in 2005 the couple shortly separated. In 2007 Gatti married Amanda Rodrigues, a Brazilian woman he met in Atlantic City, their son Arturo Gatti Jr., was born in 2008. Gatti Jr. followed in his footsteps and competed at amateur level with plans to turn professional but died at just 17 years old with his body discovered hung from an apartment in Mexico on 7 October 2025.

After he retired in 2007, Gatti returned to Montreal, Canada, and got involved in real estate/property development.

Gatti developed a strong friendship with his former opponent Micky Ward. The two often went out to dinner together and played golf. After Gatti's death, Ward stated “a big part of me is gone.” Gatti enjoyed living a lavish lifestyle however he did struggle with alcoholism throughout his life.

== In popular culture ==
In 2013, HBO released a one-hour documentary, The Tale of Gatti-Ward, as part of its Legendary Nights series. The film highlighted Gatti's iconic trilogy with Micky Ward and the friendship that followed.

In 2016, Dennis Taylor and John Raspanti published the book Intimate Warfare, which chronicled Gatti's trilogy of fights with Ward and the bond the two men later formed.

In 2023, a three-part true crime documentary titled Thunder: The Life and Death of Arturo Gatti was released. It explored Gatti's life and boxing career while also investigating the circumstances surrounding his death. The series won Best Documentary Series at that year's Alberta Film and Television Awards.

=== Video games ===
The game Fight Night Round 3 (2006) features Ward and Gatti on the cover (PS2 and Xbox versions only).

Video game appearances
Year	Title	Role
2004	Fight Night 2004	Playable character
2005	Fight Night Round 2	Playable character
2006	Fight Night Round 3	Playable character
2009	Fight Night Round 4	Playable character
2023	Undisputed	Playable character

== Professional boxing record ==
49 fights	40 wins	9 losses
By knockout	31	5
By decision	9	4

No.	Result	Record	Opponent	Type	Round, time	Date	Location	Notes
49	Loss	40–9	Alfonso Gómez	TKO	7 (10), 2:12	Jul 14, 2007	Boardwalk Hall, Atlantic City, New Jersey, U.S.	
48	Loss	40–8	Carlos Baldomir	TKO	9 (12), 2:50	Jul 22, 2006	Boardwalk Hall, Atlantic City, New Jersey, U.S.	Lost IBA welterweight title; For WBC and The Ring welterweight titles
47	Win	40–7	Thomas Damgaard	TKO	11 (12), 2:54	Jan 28, 2006	Boardwalk Hall, Atlantic City, New Jersey, U.S.	Won vacant IBA welterweight title
46	Loss	39–7	Floyd Mayweather Jr.	RTD	6 (12), 3:00	Jun 25, 2005	Boardwalk Hall, Atlantic City, New Jersey, U.S.	Lost WBC super lightweight title
45	Win	39–6	Jesse James Leija	KO	5 (12), 1:48	Jan 29, 2005	Boardwalk Hall, Atlantic City, New Jersey, U.S.	Retained WBC super lightweight title
44	Win	38–6	Leonard Doroftei	KO	2 (12), 2:55	Jul 24, 2004	Boardwalk Hall, Atlantic City, New Jersey, U.S.	Retained WBC super lightweight title
43	Win	37–6	Gianluca Branco	UD	12	Jan 24, 2004	Boardwalk Hall, Atlantic City, New Jersey, U.S.	Won vacant WBC super lightweight title
42	Win	36–6	Micky Ward	UD	10	Jun 7, 2003	Boardwalk Hall, Atlantic City, New Jersey, U.S.	
41	Win	35–6	Micky Ward	UD	10	Nov 23, 2002	Boardwalk Hall, Atlantic City, New Jersey, U.S.	
40	Loss	34–6	Micky Ward	MD	10	May 18, 2002	Mohegan Sun Arena, Montville, Connecticut, U.S.	
39	Win	34–5	Terron Millett	TKO	4 (10), 2:23	Jan 26, 2002	The Theater at Madison Square Garden, New York City, New York, U.S.	
38	Loss	33–5	Oscar De La Hoya	TKO	5 (12), 1:16	Mar 24, 2001	MGM Grand Garden Arena, Paradise, Nevada, U.S.	
37	Win	33–4	Joe Hutchinson	UD	10	Sep 8, 2000	Molson Centre, Montreal, Quebec, Canada	
36	Win	32–4	Eric Jakubowski	TKO	2 (10), 0:40	Apr 29, 2000	Madison Square Garden, New York City, New York, U.S.	
35	Win	31–4	Joey Gamache	KO	2 (10), 0:41	Feb 26, 2000	Madison Square Garden, New York City, New York, U.S.	
34	Win	30–4	Reyes Munoz	TKO	1 (10), 3:09	Aug 14, 1999	Foxwoods Resort Casino, Ledyard, Connecticut, U.S.	
33	Loss	29–4	Ivan Robinson	UD	10	Dec 12, 1998	Etess Arena, Atlantic City, New Jersey, U.S.	
32	Loss	29–3	Ivan Robinson	SD	10	Aug 22, 1998	Boardwalk Hall, Atlantic City, New Jersey, U.S.	
31	Loss	29–2	Angel Manfredy	TKO	8 (10), 2:57	Jan 17, 1998	Boardwalk Hall, Atlantic City, New Jersey, U.S.	
30	Win	29–1	Gabriel Ruelas	TKO	5 (12), 2:22	Oct 4, 1997	Boardwalk Hall, Atlantic City, New Jersey, U.S.	Retained IBF junior lightweight title
29	Win	28–1	Calvin Grove	RTD	7 (10), 3:00	May 4, 1997	Circus Maximus Showroom, Atlantic City, New Jersey, U.S.	
28	Win	27–1	Tracy Harris Patterson	UD	12	Feb 22, 1997	Convention Hall, Atlantic City, New Jersey, U.S.	Retained IBF junior lightweight title
27	Win	26–1	Feliciano Correa	KO	3 (10), 2:05	Jul 11, 1996	Madison Square Garden, New York City, New York, U.S.	
26	Win	25–1	Wilson Rodriguez	KO	6 (12), 2:16	Mar 23, 1996	The Theater at Madison Square Garden, New York City, New York, U.S.	Retained IBF junior lightweight title
25	Win	24–1	Tracy Harris Patterson	UD	12	Dec 15, 1995	Madison Square Garden, New York City, New York, U.S.	Won IBF junior lightweight title
24	Win	23–1	Carlos Vergara	TKO	1 (10), 0:57	Oct 7, 1995	Convention Hall, Atlantic City, New Jersey, U.S.	
23	Win	22–1	Barrington Francis	TKO	6 (10)	Jul 13, 1995	Circus Maximus Showroom, Atlantic City, New Jersey, U.S.	
22	Win	21–1	Tialano Tovar	KO	1 (10), 1:41	Apr 22, 1995	Bally's Park Place, Atlantic City, New Jersey, U.S.	
21	Win	20–1	Roman Smolenkov	KO	1	Mar 9, 1995	Martinihal, Groningen, Netherlands	
20	Win	19–1	Jose Sanabria	UD	12	Nov 22, 1994	Meadowlands Exposition Center, Secaucus, New Jersey, U.S.	Retained USBA junior lightweight title
19	Win	18–1	Richard Salazar	TKO	10 (12), 2:29	Aug 16, 1994	The Blue Horizon, Philadelphia, Pennsylvania, U.S.	Retained USBA junior lightweight title
18	Win	17–1	Pete Taliaferro	TKO	1 (12), 3:00	Jun 28, 1994	Meadowlands Exposition Center, Secaucus, New Jersey, U.S.	Won USBA junior lightweight title
17	Win	16–1	Darrell Singleton	TKO	1 (8), 0:41	May 6, 1994	Convention Hall, Atlantic City, New Jersey, U.S.	
16	Win	15–1	Leon Bostic	MD	8	Jan 8, 1994	Friar Tuck Inn, Catskill, New York, U.S.	
15	Win	14–1	Glenn Irizarry	TKO	1	Nov 11, 1993	Huntington Hilton Hotel, Melville, New York, U.S.	
14	Win	13–1	Derek Francis	KO	1	Oct 23, 1993	Sands Casino Hotel, Atlantic City, New Jersey, U.S.	
13	Win	12–1	Luis Guzman	KO	1	Aug 24, 1993	Merv Griffin's Resorts, Atlantic City, New Jersey, U.S.	
12	Win	11–1	Robert Scott	KO	1	Jul 30, 1993	Ramada Hotel, New York City, New York, U.S.	
11	Win	10–1	Christino Suero	KO	3 (8), 1:55	Jun 20, 1993	Harrah's Marina Hotel Casino, Atlantic City, New Jersey, U.S.	
10	Win	9–1	Clifford Hicks	KO	3	May 15, 1993	Memorial High School, Brick Township, New Jersey, U.S.	
9	Win	8–1	Curtis Mathis	TKO	3	Apr 7, 1993	Robert Treat Hotel, Newark, New Jersey, U.S.	
8	Win	7–1	Plamen Gechev	TKO	1	Mar 23, 1993	Rotterdam Ahoy Sportpaleis, Rotterdam, Netherlands	
7	Loss	6–1	King Solomon	SD	6	Nov 17, 1992	The Blue Horizon, Philadelphia, Pennsylvania, U.S.	
6	Win	6–0	Joe Lafontant	UD	6	May 15, 1992	Trump Taj Mahal, Atlantic City, New Jersey, U.S.	
5	Win	5–0	Antonio Gonzalez	TKO	1 (4), 1:35	Apr 22, 1992	Meadowlands Arena, East Rutherford, New Jersey, U.S.	
4	Win	4–0	Francisco Aguiano	TKO	1	Oct 22, 1991	The Blue Horizon, Philadelphia, Pennsylvania, U.S.	
3	Win	3–0	Richard De Jesus	TKO	1 (4), 0:28	Aug 2, 1991	Quality Inn Hotel, Newark, New Jersey, U.S.	
2	Win	2–0	Luis Melendez	KO	1 (4), 0:19	Jul 9, 1991	The Blue Horizon, Philadelphia, Pennsylvania, U.S.	
1	Win	1–0	Jose Gonzales	TKO	3 (4), 1:27	Jun 10, 1991	Meadowlands Exposition Center, Secaucus, New Jersey, U.S.	

== Pay-per-view bouts ==
Date	Fight	Billing	Buys	Network	Revenue
June 25, 2005	Gatti vs. Mayweather	Thunder & Lightning	340,000	HBO	$16,500,000

Sporting positions
Regional boxing titles
Preceded by Pete Taliaferro	USBA junior lightweight champion June 28, 1994 – March 1995; Vacated	Vacant Title next held by John Brown
Minor world boxing titles
Vacant Title last held by Shane Mosley	IBA welterweight champion January 28, 2006 – July 22, 2006	Succeeded by Carlos Baldomir
Major world boxing titles
Preceded by Tracy Harris Patterson	IBF junior lightweight champion December 15, 1995 – February 8, 1998; Vacated	Vacant Title next held by Robert Garcia
Preceded by Kostya Tszyu	WBC super lightweight champion January 24, 2004 – June 25, 2005	Succeeded by Floyd Mayweather Jr.
Awards
Previous: Evander Holyfield vs. Mike Tyson	The Ring Fight of the Year vs. Gabriel Ruelas; 1997	Next: Ivan Robinson vs. Arturo Gatti
Previous: Wilfredo Vázquez; KO11 Eloy Rojas	The Ring Knockout of the Year; KO5 Gabriel Ruelas; 1997	Next: Roy Jones Jr. KO4 Virgil Hill
Previous: Arturo Gatti vs. Gabriel Ruelas	The Ring Fight of the Year vs. Ivan Robinson; 1998	Next: Paulie Ayala vs. Johnny Tapia
Previous: Micky Ward vs. Emanuel Augustus	The Ring Fight of the Year vs. Micky Ward; 2002	Next: Arturo Gatti vs. Micky Ward II
Inaugural award	BWAA Fight of the Year vs. Micky Ward; 2002	Next: James Toney vs. Vassily Jirov
Previous: John Michael Johnson	The Ring Comeback of the Year; 2002	Next: James Toney
Previous: Arturo Gatti vs. Micky Ward	The Ring Fight of the Year vs. Micky Ward II; 2003	Next: Marco Antonio Barrera vs. Erik Morales II
Junior welterweight status
Previous: Giovanni Parisi	Latest born world champion to die July 11, 2009 – September 14, 2025	Succeeded by Ricky Hatton
