= Joe Gatti =

Canadian boxer

Personal information
- Nickname: Lightning
- Born: 12 April 1967 (age 59) Montreal, Quebec, Canada
- Height: 5 ft 11 in (1.80 m)
- Weight: Welterweight; Light middleweight; Middleweight; Super middleweight; Light heavyweight

Boxing career
- Stance: Orthodox

Boxing record
- Total fights: 38
- Wins: 30
- Win by KO: 22
- Losses: 8

Joe Gatti (born 12 April 1967) is a Canadian former professional boxer who competed from 1987 to 2002. He challenged twice for world championships; the WBC super welterweight title in 1993 and the IBF super middleweight title in 2002. He is the older brother of former two-division world champion of boxing, Arturo Gatti.

== Personal ==
Born in Montreal, Quebec, Gatti relocated to Jersey City, New Jersey, in the late 1980s from Canada, where he lived and trained with Panama Lewis. Joe was the chief sparring partner of Canadian-born champion Matthew Hilton.

== Professional career ==
Although Joe did not live up to the fame and fortune of his younger brother, he held a steadfast career record, boasting 30 wins (22 K.O.) and 8 losses between 1987 and 2002.

Gatti turned professional in 1987 and won his first four pro bouts and later compiled a winning streak to set up a bout with Terry Norris for the WBC light middleweight title in 1993. Norris crushed Gatti, winning by TKO in the first round. The loss to Norris was the beginning of the end for the once-promising Gatti, and he went on to lose to former champion James McGirt in 1995. Gatti later challenged Sven Ottke for the IBF super middleweight title in 2002, but lost via TKO. This was the final fight of Gatti's career. Joe Gatti is now a member of the International Union of Elevator Constructors.

In 2013 Gatti was inducted into the New Jersey Boxing Hall of Fame.

== See also ==
- Notable boxing families
- Arturo Gatti
