= Julian Wheeler =

American boxer

Personal information
- Nickname: The Killer
- Born: April 22, 1971 (age 55) Virginia Beach, Virginia, U.S.
- Height: 5 ft 9 in (175 cm)
- Weight: Welterweight; Light welterweight Lightweight; Super featherweight

Boxing career
- Reach: 74 in (188 cm)
- Stance: Orthodox

Boxing record
- Total fights: 31
- Wins: 22
- Win by KO: 8
- Losses: 2
- Draws: 0
- No contests: 0

Julian Wheeler (born April 22, 1971) is an American former professional boxer who competed from 1993 to 2002. He is the former WBC Continental Americas super featherweight and USBA lightweight champion.

== Amateur highlights ==
- 1992 United States Amateur Featherweight Champion
- 1992 Qualified for the United States Olympic Team as a Featherweight, at the Olympic Trials in Worcester, Massachusetts. Results were:
  - Wayne Chandler won on points
  - Willie Jorrin won on points
  - Ivan Robinson won on points
  - Ivan Robinson won on points, this match was at the Box-Offs in Phoenix, Arizona.
  - Competed at the 1992 Barcelona Olympic Games as a Featherweight. Result was:
  - Ramazan Palyani (Russia/Unified Team) lost on points (4-8)
- 1993 United States Amateur Featherweight Champion
- 1993 competed as a Featherweight at the World Championships in Tampere, Finland. Results were:
  - Paul Griffin (Ireland) won on points
  - Ramazan Palyani (Georgia) lost on points

== Professional career ==
Wheeler turned pro in 1993 and had some good success.

=== NABF Super Featherweight title ===
After winning his first 11 bouts, he lost to Mexican American Robert Garcia for the NABF Super Featherweight title in 1995.

His career went downhill shortly thereafter and he suffered defeats to Juan Manuel Márquez, Jorge Páez (twice), and Juan Lazcano.

=== IBC Light Welterweight title ===
In December 1998, Wheeler beat an undefeated Victor McKinnis to win the IBC Light Welterweight title.

He retired in 2002 after losing a close decision to Leavander Johnson in an IBF Lightweight Title Eliminator.
