= Angel Manfredy =

American boxer

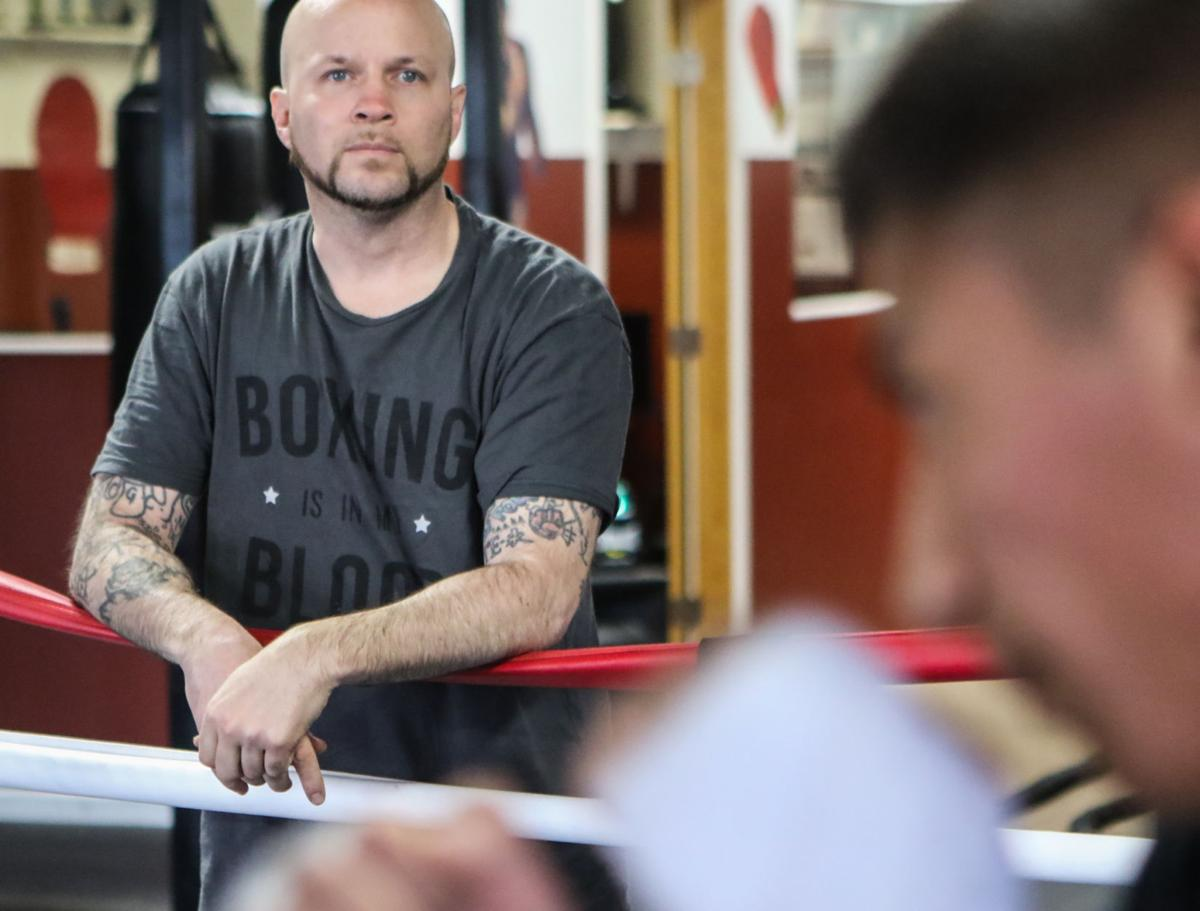

Personal information
- Nickname: El Diablo
- Nationality: American
- Born: October 30, 1974 (age 51) Gary, Indiana, U.S.
- Weight: Featherweight; Super featherweight Lightweight

Boxing career
- Stance: Orthodox

Boxing record
- Total fights: 52
- Wins: 43
- Win by KO: 32
- Losses: 8
- Draws: 1

Angel Manfredy (born October 30, 1974) is a Puerto Rican-American former professional boxer. Angel Manfredy was a popular fighter in the late 1990s.

== Personal ==
Manfredy, nicknamed El Diablo (The Devil) because of his reckless lifestyle and of his boxing style converted to Christianity after trying to commit suicide in his bed while on cocaine.

He wears a tattoo of the Puerto Rican Flag on his shoulder. Also he has a tattoo of the cross and a naked lady.

== Amateur career ==
Manfredy had an amateur record of 48–8.

== Professional career ==
Manfredy was known for his walk-ins to his matches wearing a latex mask depicting Satan, which he used until his fight with Floyd Mayweather and conversion to Apostolic Pentecostalism.

During his career, Manfredy defeated notable fighters, such as Arturo Gatti (by technical knockout), Ivan Robinson (by knockout), Jorge Páez, and Julio Díaz (by a split decision). He also fought notables Floyd Mayweather Jr., Paul Spadafora and Diego Corrales. A frequent contender, Manfredy was a former WBU Super Featherweight champion, but lost in each of four attempts to capture a World Title. Manfredy currently has a record of 43-8-1 (32 knockouts).

Manfredy lost two of his first five fights, but then won 23 in a row, including wins over former champions such as Calvin Grove, and Jorge Páez, and top contenders such as Wilson Rodriguez, before landing his first major fight against Gatti, in the latter's hometown of Atlantic City. Manfredy, who was an underdog, dominated the fight, knocking Gatti down in the third round, and eventually stopping him on cuts in round 8.

Following this fight, Manfredy fought twice before fighting Floyd Mayweather Jr. in a major HBO television event. Manfredy was stopped in the second round after a barrage of punches. Manfredy called the stoppage premature and stated he was not injured. This was one of Manfredy's first fights in his new Christian personality, and celebrated having Kid Rock appear at the match singing for him during his walk-in.

Following this fight, Manfredy knocked out Ivan Robinson in what had been HBO's Boxing After Dark's highest-rated show of 1999. Manfredy then received another world title shot against Stevie Johnston in 1999, but was thoroughly outboxed. In 2002 Manfredy challenged Paul Spadafora for the International Boxing FederationWorld lightweight title. Spadafora beat Manfredy in a close decision. Manfredy last fought in 2004.

== Training and Promoting ==
In 2017 Manfredy took a position as a trainer and promoter in Crown Point, Indiana in a gym owned by boxer Ricky Carr.

As of 2023 Manfredy has been teaching boxing as a personal trainer. He currently trains his clients at Premier Mixed Martial Arts in Schereville.

== See also ==
- List of Puerto Rican boxing world champions

== Professional boxing record ==
52 fights	43 wins	8 losses
By knockout	32	4
By decision	11	4
Draws	1	

No.	Result	Record	Opponent	Type	Round	Date	Location	Notes
53	Loss	43–8–1 (1)	Craig Weber	UD	10	Apr 16, 2004	Gund Arena, Cleveland, Ohio, U.S.	
52	Win	43–7–1 (1)	Johnny West	TKO	9 (10)	Nov 7, 2003	Don Haskins Center, El Paso, Texas, U.S.	
51	Loss	42–7–1 (1)	Courtney Burton	KO	8 (10)	Jul 29, 2003	Civic Center, Hammond, Indiana, U.S.	
50	Win	42–6–1 (1)	John Bailey	TKO	7 (10)	Jun 6, 2003	Turning Stone Resort & Casino, Verona, New York, U.S.	
49	Win	41–6–1 (1)	Moises Pedroza	TKO	7 (10)	Mar 31, 2003	Statehouse Convention Center, Little Rock, Arkansas, U.S.	
48	Win	40–6–1 (1)	Antonio Ramirez	MD	10	Jun 11, 2002	Mountaineer Casino Racetrack and Resort, Chester, West Virginia, U.S.	
47	Loss	39–6–1 (1)	Paul Spadafora	UD	12	Mar 9, 2002	AJ Palumbo Center, Pittsburgh, Pennsylvania, U.S.	For IBF lightweight title
46	Win	39–5–1 (1)	Julio Díaz	SD	12	Oct 6, 2001	Memorial Coliseum, Corpus Christi, Texas, U.S.	
45	Win	38–5–1 (1)	Lamar Murphy	UD	10	Aug 3, 2001	Yakama Legends Casino, Toppenish, Washington, U.S.	
44	Win	37–5–1 (1)	Verdell Smith	TKO	7 (10)	Jun 23, 2001	Grand Casino, Tunica, Mississippi, U.S.	
43	Win	36–5–1 (1)	Juan Angel Macias	UD	10	Mar 18, 2001	Grand Victoria Casino, Rising Sun, Indiana, U.S.	
42	Win	35–5–1 (1)	Juan Polo Perez	TKO	4 (10)	Jan 18, 2001	Grand Casino, Biloxi, Mississippi, U.S.	
41	Win	34–5–1 (1)	Carlos Alberto Ramirez	RTD	5 (10)	Dec 1, 2000	MGM Grand, Grand Garden Arena, Las Vegas, Nevada, U.S.	
40	Loss	33–5–1 (1)	Diego Corrales	TKO	3 (12)	Sep 2, 2000	Don Haskins Center, El Paso, Texas, U.S.	For IBF and IBA super featherweight titles
39	Win	33–4–1 (1)	Agustin Lorenzo	TKO	1 (10)	Jun 25, 2000	Majestic Star Casino, Gary, Indiana, U.S.	
38	Win	32–4–1 (1)	Jerry Cooper	TKO	1 (10)	May 13, 2000	Conseco Fieldhouse, Indianapolis, Indiana, U.S.	
37	Win	31–4–1 (1)	Shawn Simmons	TKO	5 (10)	Apr 30, 2000	Grand Victoria Casino, Elgin, Illinois, U.S.	
36	Win	30–4–1 (1)	Vincent Howard	UD	10	Mar 7, 2000	Molson Centre, Montreal, Quebec, Canada	
35	Win	29–4–1 (1)	Sean Fletcher	TKO	4 (10)	Feb 18, 2000	Ballys Park Place Hotel Casino, Atlantic City, New Jersey, U.S.	
34	Loss	28–4–1 (1)	Stevie Johnston	UD	12	Aug 14, 1999	Foxwoods Resort, Mashantucket, Connecticut, U.S.	For WBC lightweight title
33	Win	28–3–1 (1)	Luis Alfonso Lizarraga	KO	5 (10)	Jun 23, 1999	Ramada Inn, Rosemont, Illinois, U.S.	
32	Win	27–3–1 (1)	Ivan Robinson	UD	10	Apr 17, 1999	Fantasy Springs Casino, Indio, California, U.S.	
31	Win	26–3–1 (1)	Ernesto Benitez	KO	3 (10)	Mar 3, 1999	Ramada Inn, Rosemont, Illinois, U.S.	
30	Loss	25–3–1 (1)	Floyd Mayweather Jr.	TKO	2 (12)	Dec 19, 1998	Miccosukee Indian Gaming Resort, Miami, Florida, U.S.	For WBC super featherweight title
29	Win	25–2–1 (1)	John Brown	UD	12	Sep 22, 1998	Madison Square Garden Theater, New York City, New York, U.S.	Retained WBU super featherweight title
28	Win	24–2–1 (1)	Isander Lacen	RTD	7 (10)	Jun 16, 1998	Grand Casino, Biloxi, Mississippi, U.S.	
27	Win	23–2–1 (1)	Arturo Gatti	TKO	8 (10)	Jan 17, 1998	Convention Hall, Atlantic City, New Jersey, U.S.	
26	Win	22–2–1 (1)	Jorge Páez	TKO	8 (12)	Aug 2, 1997	Mohegan Sun Casino, Uncasville, Connecticut, U.S.	Retained WBU super featherweight title
25	Win	21–2–1 (1)	Kevin Sedam	TKO	2 (8)	Jun 27, 1997	Midlane Civic Center, Wadsworth, Illinois, U.S.	
24	Win	20–2–1 (1)	Wilson Rodriguez	UD	12	Feb 22, 1997	Convention Center, Atlantic City, New Jersey, U.S.	Retained WBU super featherweight title
23	Win	19–2–1 (1)	Wilfredo Ruiz	KO	5 (12)	Dec 7, 1996	Vienna, Austria	Retained WBU super featherweight title
22	Win	18–2–1 (1)	Scott Sala	TKO	2 (8)	Aug 23, 1996	Fiesta Palace, Waukegan, Illinois, U.S.	
21	Win	17–2–1 (1)	Mthobeli Mhlophe	KO	5 (12)	Jul 20, 1996	Morula Sun, Mabopane, North-West, South Africa	Retained WBU super featherweight title
20	NC	16–2–1 (1)	David Toledo	NC	5 (12)	Mar 16, 1996	Fernwood Resort, Bushkill, Pennsylvania, U.S.	Retained WBU super featherweight title
19	Win	16–2–1	Antonio Young	TKO	2 (8)	Feb 22, 1996	Civic Center, Hammond, Indiana, U.S.	
18	Win	15–2–1	Harold Petty	RTD	5 (12)	Dec 16, 1995	The Roxy, Boston, Massachusetts, U.S.	Retained WBU super featherweight title
17	Win	14–2–1	Leon Rozier	TKO	1 (8)	Dec 7, 1995	Hammond, Indiana, U.S.	
16	Win	13–2–1	Calvin Grove	TKO	7 (12)	Nov 18, 1995	Taj Majal Hotel & Casino, Atlantic City, New Jersey, U.S.	Won vacant WBU super featherweight title
15	Win	12–2–1	Vittorio Salvatore	KO	4 (12)	Apr 12, 1995	Royal York Hotel, Toronto, Ontario, Canada	Won vacant WBF Intercontinental super featherweight title
14	Win	11–2–1	Damion Sutton	KO	3 (?)	Feb 25, 1995	Galena, Illinois, U.S.	
13	Win	10–2–1	Antonio Carter	TKO	1 (8)	Feb 23, 1995	Civic Center, Hammond, Indiana, U.S.	
12	Win	9–2–1	Jeff Whaley	KO	2 (?)	Dec 16, 1994	St. Andrew's Gym, Chicago, Illinois, U.S.	
11	Win	8–2–1	Charles McClellan	UD	8	Nov 18, 1994	International Amphitheatre, Chicago, Illinois, U.S.	
10	Win	7–2–1	Jimmy Deoria	UD	8	Oct 8, 1994	Hulman Center, Terre Haute, Indiana, U.S.	
9	Win	6–2–1	Richard Leepard	TKO	1 (?)	Sep 29, 1994	Civic Center, Hammond, Indiana, U.S.	
8	Win	5–2–1	Hector Olmedo	KO	1 (?)	Sep 13, 1994	Chicago, Illinois, U.S.	
7	Win	4–2–1	Kenny Mitchell	PTS	6	Aug 9, 1994	Mystic Lake Casino, Prior Lake, Minnesota, U.S.	
6	Win	3–2–1	Richard Campbell	TKO	1 (?)	Jun 4, 1994	Col Ballroom, Davenport, Iowa, U.S.	
5	Loss	2–2–1	Jeff Mason	MD	4	May 26, 1994	Chicago, Illinois, U.S.	
4	Win	2–1–1	Jorge Lopez	KO	1 (?)	Nov 5, 1993	Gary, Indiana, U.S.	
3	Win	1–1–1	Eric Crumble	KO	1 (?)	Sep 3, 1993	Gary, Indiana, U.S.	
2	Draw	0–1–1	Jose Luis Carrillo	TD	4	Aug 6, 1993	Gary, Indiana, U.S.	
1	Loss	0–1	Charles McClellan	TKO	2 (4)	Jun 10, 1993	Civic Center, Hammond, Indiana, U.S.	
