= Wilson Rodriguez =

Dominican Republic boxer (born 1966)

Wilson Rodríguez (born February 4, 1966, in Santiago, Dominican Republic) is a retired professional boxer, best known for his 1996 fight with Arturo Gatti (a runner up for Ring Magazine's 1996 Fight of the Year) and his reign as IBF Inter-Continental super featherweight titleholder, which he successfully defended 6 times.

His career record was 48 wins, 10 losses, 3 draws. He was considered a good fighter at the time, and had some prominent fights with John John Molina, Arturo Gatti (whom he dropped before losing to), and Angel Manfredy.
