= James Crayton =

American boxer

James Edward Crayton, alias Too Sweet, is an American former professional boxer.

== Personal life ==
Crayton is a native and a resident of Las Vegas, Nevada.

== Professional career ==
=== Early career ===
Crayton's made his professional debut on April 7, of 1994, chalking up a knockout win against Agustin Rocha. Crayton's career got off to a shaky start, with his first loss coming in his fourth bout and his second loss in his eighth bout. However, Crayton pulled himself together and strung together 12 consecutive wins before falling at the hands of Derrick Gainer in January 1996. By this time Crayton was considered a high-level journeyman, and saw action against such established pros as Javier Leon, John John Molina, Arnulfo Castillo, Gabriel Ruelas, and in a fight for the WBF lightweight title, Juan Lazcano. Unfortunately for Crayton, he lost all these fights.

=== The death of Johnny Montantes ===
On September 26 of 1997 Crayton faced rising prospect Jumping Johnny Montantes in Las Vegas. Both fighters had much to gain with a win - Montantes (28-3) was trying to make a name for himself and Crayton (23-8) was trying to keep his career afloat. The fight was fairly even until the fifth round, when Crayton knocked Montantes out with a powerful right hand. Montantes was actually knocked unconscious and never regained consciousness. Two days later doctors declared him brain dead and removed him from life support.

=== Later career ===
Crayton missed no time in the ring, and even put together a five-bout winning streak in the wake of Montantes' death, culminating in a match against Golden Johnson for the NABF lightweight title. Crayton lost that fight, then won three of five subsequent fights, and thereafter went on a slide. Though Crayton is still an active professional fighter at this writing (spring 2008), his record since the summer of 1999 is 4-18. To date, his career record stands at 34 wins, 27 losses, and 2 draws, with 21 wins by knockout.
