= Thomas Damgaard =

Danish boxer (born 1971)

Personal information
- Nickname: Løvehjerte ("Lionheart")
- Nationality: Danish
- Born: 17 June 1971 (age 55) Kalundborg, Denmark
- Height: 1.74 m (5 ft 9 in)
- Weight: Light-welterweight; Welterweight

Boxing career
- Reach: 174 cm (69 in)
- Stance: Orthodox

Boxing record
- Total fights: 39
- Wins: 38
- Win by KO: 28
- Losses: 1

Thomas Damgaard (born 17 June 1971) is a Danish former professional boxer who competed from 1998 to 2007. He held the European super-lightweight title from 1998 to 1999, and the European welterweight title in 2000.

== Professional career ==
Damgaard made his professional debut on 13 February 1998, scoring a fifth-round knockout against Antonio Gallegos. In only his tenth fight, nine months later on 27 November, Damgaard won the vacant European super-lightweight title by stopping Jose Manuel Berdonce in the twelfth and final round. He would make two defences, against Khalid Rahilou on 16 April 1999 (fourth-round knockout) and Miguel Angel Pena on 1 October 1999 (seventh-round stoppage). On 3 November 2000, Damgaard won the European welterweight title in a split decision over Alessandro Duran. No defences were made, but Damgaard continued to spend the next five years undefeated, fighting exclusively in Denmark.

On 28 January 2006, Damgaard travelled abroad for the first time to face established veteran Arturo Gatti in the United States. A fan-friendly slugfest was the result, at the end of which Damgaard was stopped on his feet in eleven rounds after trailing on all three judges' scorecards. It would prove to be the penultimate fight in Damgaard's career, and the third-last for Gatti. Both would retire from boxing in 2007.

== Professional boxing record ==
39 fights	38 wins	1 loss
By knockout	28	1
By decision	10	0

No.	Result	Record	Opponent	Type	Round, time	Date	Location	Notes
39	Win	38–1	(Belgium) Jean Louis Bryla	KO	2 (6), 1:52	24 Mar 2007	Parken Stadium, Copenhagen, Denmark	
38	Loss	37–1	(Canada) Arturo Gatti	TKO	11 (12), 2:54	28 Jan 2006	(United States) Boardwalk Hall, Atlantic City, New Jersey, US	For vacant IBA welterweight title
37	Win	37–0	(Zambia) Bruno Sakabunda	UD	8	30 Sep 2005	Vesthallen, Slagelse, Denmark	
36	Win	36–0	(Zambia) Stephen Chungu	UD	8	17 Jun 2005	SAS Radisson, Aarhus, Denmark	
35	Win	35–0	(Mexico) Rocky Martinez	TKO	6 (8), 2:02	15 Apr 2005	K.B. Hallen, Copenhagen, Denmark	
34	Win	34–0	(Barbados) Christopher Henry	TD	5 (8)	28 Feb 2004	Aalborghallen, Aalborg, Denmark	Unanimous TD after Damgaard was cut
33	Win	33–0	(Brazil) Luiz Caetano da Silva	KO	2 (8)	6 Feb 2004	Falkoner Center, Copenhagen, Denmark	
32	Win	32–0	(Venezuela) Presente Brito	UD	8	7 Mar 2003	Jetsmark Idrætscenter, Pandrup, Denmark	
31	Win	31–0	(Chile) Oscar Benavides Muñoz	KO	3 (8), 2:59	4 Oct 2002	Stadionhal, Holbæk, Denmark	
30	Win	30–0	(South Africa) Peter Malinga	KO	9 (12), 2:04	14 Jun 2002	K.B. Hallen, Copenhagen, Denmark	Retained WBA Inter-Continental and IBC welterweight titles
29	Win	29–0	(France) Abdel Mehidi	UD	8	19 Apr 2002	Falkoner Center, Copenhagen, Denmark	
28	Win	28–0	(Colombia) Wilfredo Ruiz	TKO	2 (8), 2:19	15 Mar 2002	Stadionhal, Viborg, Denmark	
27	Win	27–0	(Dominican Republic) Elias Cruz	TKO	3 (8), 1:06	8 Feb 2002	Falkoner Center, Copenhagen, Denmark	
26	Win	26–0	(Chile) Freddy Rojas	TKO	3 (12)	13 Oct 2001	Parken Stadium, Copenhagen, Denmark	Retained WBA Inter-Continental and IBC welterweight titles
25	Win	25–0	(United States) Rodney Jones	KO	3 (12)	27 Apr 2001	Aalborghallen, Aalborg, Denmark	Retained WBA Inter-Continental and IBC welterweight titles
24	Win	24–0	(Mexico) Juan Carlos Rodriguez	UD	8	9 May 2001	K.B. Hallen, Copenhagen, Denmark	
23	Win	23–0	(Costa Rica) Humberto Aranda	TKO	4 (8)	9 Feb 2001	Idrætshal, Odense, Denmark	
22	Win	22–0	(Italy) Alessandro Duran	SD	12	3 Nov 2000	K.B. Hallen, Copenhagen, Denmark	Retained IBC welterweight title; Won European and vacant WBA Inter-Continental welterweight titles
21	Win	21–0	(United States) Luis Maysonet	KO	1 (8)	1 Sep 2000	Hallerne, Kolding, Denmark	
20	Win	20–0	(Puerto Rico) Fontaine Campbell	KO	2 (12)	26 May 2000	Stadionhal, Holbæk, Denmark	Retained IBC welterweight title
19	Win	19–0	(Australia) Philip Holiday	UD	12	18 Feb 2000	Aalborghallen, Aalborg, Denmark	Won vacant IBC welterweight title
18	Win	18–0	(United States) Bobby Elkins	KO	2 (8), 2:00	14 Jan 2000	Hallerne, Kolding, Denmark	
17	Win	17–0	(Mexico) Jose Luis Benitez	TKO	2 (8)	29 Oct 1999	K.B. Hallen, Copenhagen, Denmark	
16	Win	16–0	(Spain) Miguel Angel Peña	TKO	7 (12)	1 Oct 1999	Arena Randers, Randers, Denmark	Retained European super-lightweight title
15	Win	15–0	(United States) Greg Haugen	TKO	6 (8)	3 Sep 1999	K.B. Hallen, Copenhagen, Denmark	
14	Win	14–0	(Dominican Republic) Francisco Alvarez	TKO	4 (8)	18 Jun 1999	Idrættens Hus, Vejle, Denmark	
13	Win	13–0	(United States) Jimmy Zeikle	KO	2 (8)	14 May 1999	Circus Building, Copenhagen, Denmark	
12	Win	12–0	(Dominican Republic) Khalid Rahilou	KO	4 (12)	16 Apr 1999	K.B. Hallen, Copenhagen, Denmark	Retained European super-lightweight title
11	Win	11–0	(Mexico) Eloy Ortega	KO	3 (8), 0:56	12 Feb 1999	Falkoner Center, Copenhagen, Denmark	
10	Win	10–0	(Spain) Jose Manuel Berdonce	TKO	12 (12)	27 Nov 1998	Vejlby-Risskov Hallen, Aarhus, Denmark	Won vacant European super-lightweight title
9	Win	9–0	(United Kingdom) Ray Newby	TKO	3 (6)	6 Nov 1998	K.B. Hallen, Copenhagen, Denmark	
8	Win	8–0	(Mexico) Narciso Valenzuela	TKO	1 (6)	16 Oct 1998	Aalborghallen, Aalborg, Denmark	
7	Win	7–0	(Mexico) Eduardo Martinez	UD	6	4 Sep 1998	Hallerne, Kolding, Denmark	
6	Win	6–0	(United States) Hector Leguillow	TKO	5 (6)	5 Jun 1998	K.B. Hallen, Copenhagen, Denmark	
5	Win	5–0	(The Bahamas) Steve Larrimore	TKO	4 (6)	1 May 1998	Teater, Kolding, Denmark	
4	Win	4–0	(United Kingdom) Pat Larner	KO	3 (6)	3 Apr 1998	Stadionhal, Holbæk, Denmark	
3	Win	3–0	(United States) Shawn Carter	TKO	2 (6)	20 Mar 1998	Vejlby-Risskov Hallen, Aarhus, Denmark	
2	Win	2–0	(Portugal) Carlos Rocha Tomar	UD	6	27 Feb 1998	Storebæltshallen, Korsør, Denmark	
1	Win	1–0	(Mexico) Antonio Gallegos	KO	5 (6)	13 Feb 1998	Falkoner Center, Copenhagen, Denmark	Professional debut

Sporting positions
Regional boxing titles
Vacant Title last held by Soren Sondergaard	European super-lightweight champion 27 November 1998 – February 2000; Vacated	Vacant Title next held by Oktay Urkal
Preceded by Alessandro Duran	European welterweight champion 3 November 2000 – April 2001; Vacated	Vacant Title next held by Alessandro Duran
Vacant Title last held by Marcelo Domingo Di Croce	WBA Inter-Continental welterweight champion 3 November 2000 – October 2002; Vacated	Vacant Title next held by Luca Messi
Minor world boxing titles
Vacant Title last held by Carlos Baldomir	IBC welterweight champion 18 February 2000 – 2005; Vacated	Vacant Title next held by Sugar Jackson
