= Héctor Camacho Jr. =

Puerto Rican boxer

Personal information
- Nickname: Machito
- Nationality: Puerto Rican/Mexican
- Born: Hector Camacho Herrera; September 20, 1978 (age 47) Spanish Harlem, Manhattan, New York, U.S.
- Height: 1.73 m (5 ft 8 in)

Boxing career
- Reach: 175 cm (69 in)
- Stance: Southpaw

Boxing record
- Total fights: 67
- Wins: 58
- Win by KO: 32
- Losses: 7
- Draws: 1
- No contests: 1

Héctor "Machito" Camacho Herrera (Note: In this name that follows Hispanic American naming customs, the first or paternal surname is Camacho and the second or maternal family name is Herrera.) (born September 20, 1978) is an American-born Puerto Rican and Mexican professional boxer and published writer residing in Phoenix, Arizona, United States. He started boxing professionally at the age of 18. He is the son of the late three-time world champion Héctor "Macho" Camacho and the nephew of Felix "Showtime" Camacho. In 2007, 2010, 2014, and 2016, he won the World Boxing Council (WBC) Caribbean Boxing Federation (CABOFE) Light Middleweight title. His mother was born in Monterrey, Nuevo León, Mexico.

== Early life and education ==
Hector Camacho Jr. was born and raised in New York City. His parents were quite young and did not marry; his father was Héctor Camacho, then 16 years old, who lived in Spanish Harlem. The senior Camacho, nicknamed "Macho", became an amateur boxer and, later a professional.

The boy was nicknamed "Machito". He grew up admiring his father's fighting skills and imitating him, and was more interested in fighting than school. At the age of eight, Camacho Jr. was noted for doing mock sparring with his dad before his father's world title defense on June 13, 1986, against Edwin Rosario at Madison Square Garden in New York City. That night, the boy wore a Puerto Rican flag outfit.

== Professional career ==
His fight against the former world champion Jesse James Leija resulted in a no contest, after Leija's team protested the awarding of the fight on points to Camacho. The fight was stopped in the fifth round due to an unintentional headbutt by Leija that opened a cut over Camacho's eye. Camacho indicated he did not want to continue. The referees went to their scorecards to determine the winner, and gave Camacho the decision. Many fans felt he quit in the fight.

Camacho is a member of Team Fight to Walk, which raises money to support spinal cord research. Other boxers, including Boyd Melson, Demetrius Andrade, Shawn Estrada, Steve Cunningham and Deandre Latimore, help support this organization.

In 2002, Camacho lost for the first time, to Omar Weis from Argentina, by a decision in ten rounds.

On July 9, 2005, Camacho Jr. and his father co-starred an undercard in Tucson, Arizona. After riding into the ring on a fake bull, Camacho Jr. proceeded to knock out Francisco Barra in the second round. A riot in the audience followed his father's win that night; it is not known if Camacho Jr. had a role in the riot.

Camacho fought against Andrey Tsurkan at the Boardwalk Hall in Atlantic City, New Jersey, on June 10, 2006. Tsurkan won by a TKO in the 8th round.

In July 2007, Camacho lost a decision to Don Juan Futrell. Camacho came in overweight at 161 pounds and was outworked by the 150-pound Futrell. Sports journalists thought Camacho's hopes for any future title contention were in doubt based on his condition and performance in that fight.

=== Suspended ===
In December 2008, Camacho was indefinitely suspended by the Puerto Rico Boxing Commission as a result of his cancelling a bout with Yory Boy Campas in November in Tijuana, Mexico. Camacho had denied signing for that bout.

=== Caribbean light middleweight title ===
Camacho got back into shape and on August 29, 2009, he defeated Israel Cardona for the vacant WBC Caribbean Boxing Federation (CABOFE) Light Middleweight title. In an interview prior to the match, Camacho said that his passion for boxing had been re-ignited and he wanted to win a world title.

On October 30, 2009, Camacho Jr. fought Luis "Yory Boy" Campas in El Paso, Texas. Camacho won the 10-round bout by a split decision, with the scores of 96–91 and 95–92 for him, and 92–95 for Campas. This was a sort of "revenge", as Campas had a draw with the fighter's father, Héctor Camacho, just a few months before.

Camacho was reported to have challenged the former Champion Fernando Vargas, but no fight resulted.

On October 29, 2010, Camacho was knocked out by David Lemieux, then the undefeated middleweight contender, in the first round at the Bell Centre, in Montreal, Quebec, Canada.

== Personal life ==
In 2013, Camacho said in an interview that it was his father's death and his conversion to Islam that helped him make his comeback into boxing. On September 1, 2014, a book written by Camacho, Jr. was published. The book, "Macho Dad", is a comic book that portrays his dad as a Puerto Rican flag-wearing superhero.

== Professional boxing record ==
58 Wins (32 knockouts), 6 Losses, 1 Draws
Res.	Record	Opponent	Type	Rd., Time	Date	Location	Notes
Win	58–6–1	(Mexico) Miguel Angel Munguia	TKO	2 (10)	2014-08-16	(United States) Carole Heafner Center, Charlotte, North Carolina, USA	
Loss	57–6–1	(United States) Hector Munoz	UD	10 (10)	2013-09-11	(United States) BlueWater Resort & Casino, Parker, Arizona, USA	
Win	57–5–1	(Republic of Ireland) Lee Murtagh	UD	8 (18)	2013-08-08	(United States) Frontier Field, Rochester, New York, USA	
Loss	56–5–1	(Mexico) Miguel Angel Munguia	TKO	5 (10)	2013-05-03	Centro Bético Croes, Santa Cruz, Aruba	
Win	56–4–1	(Mexico) Arsenio Terrazas	KO	4 (10)	2013-04-20	Coliseo Manuel ‘Petaca’ Iguina, Arecibo, Puerto Rico	
Loss	55–4–1	(Mexico) Luis Grajeda	KO	6 (10)	2012-07-28	Parque el Palomar, Chihuahua, Chihuahua, Mexico	
Win	55–3–1	(United States) John David Charles	KO	1 (6)	2012-06-23	(United States) La Villita Maverick Plaza, San Antonio, Texas, USA	
Win	54–3–1	(United States) Juan Astorga	UD	8 (8)	2011-02-11	(United States) Don Haskins Center, El Paso, Texas, USA	
Loss	53–3–1	(Canada) David Lemieux	KO	1 (12)	2010-10-29	Bell Centre, Montreal, Quebec, Canada	For WBC International middleweight title
Win	53–2–1	(Guyana) Denny Dalton	UD	10 (10)	2010-06-05	Princess Hotel, Georgetown, Guyana	

== Exhibition boxing record ==
1 fight	0 wins	0 losses
Non-scored	1	

No.	Result	Record	Opponent	Type	Round, time	Date	Location	Notes
1	—N/a	0–0 (1)	(Mexico) Julio César Chávez	—N/a	4	June 19, 2021	Estadio Jalisco, Guadalajara, Mexico	Non-scored bout
