= Juan Lazcano =

Mexican-American boxer (born 1975)

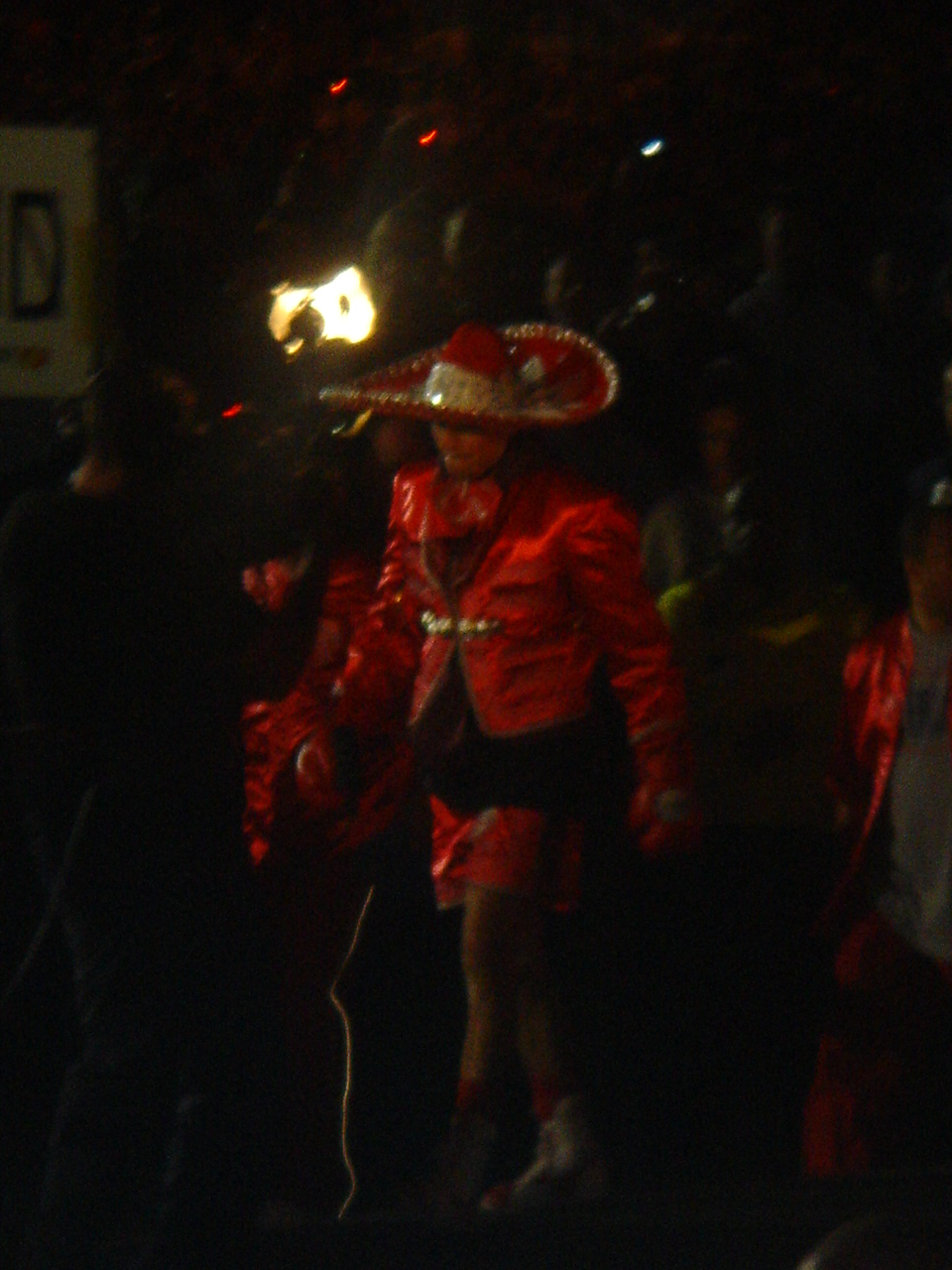
- Lazcano in 2008

Personal information
- Nicknames: The Hispanic Causing Panic; The Chosen
- Nationality: Mexican; American
- Born: Juan Ernesto Lazcano; March 23, 1975 (age 51) Ciudad Juárez, Chihuahua, Mexico
- Height: 5 ft 9 in (175 cm)
- Weight: Light welterweight Lightweight

Boxing career
- Reach: 72 in (183 cm)
- Stance: Orthodox

Boxing record
- Total fights: 43
- Wins: 37
- Win by KO: 27
- Losses: 5
- Draws: 1

Juan Lazcano (born March 23, 1975) is a Mexican-born American professional boxer currently based in Sacramento, California. He fights at light welterweight and is a former World Boxing Foundation (WBF), NABF and IBA lightweight champion, as well as having challenged for the IBO light welterweight title.

== Background ==
Lazcano was born in Ciudad Juárez and was moved to El Paso when two months old. There, he attended Jefferson High School, later finishing at Bowie High. At Jefferson High, he and classmate Daniel Puente, along with other young boxers, sparred together at Rocky's Gym where he was crowned the Golden Gloves. He now lives and fights out of Sacramento, California.

He and Lourdes were childhood sweethearts, but are now divorced. Together they raised four children;His step-son and three of their own. They became parents when Juan was only 17 years of age. Lazcano is engaged to Tammy Howard, a teacher in Phoenix, AZ. They have been together since 2018.

== Amateur career ==
Lazcano had an extensive amateur career. He had in excess of 100 amateur fights from the age of 8 to 18 with 135 wins and 15 losses and won the Texas Golden Gloves titles and boxed in the US national championships at both junior and open class levels.

== Professional career ==
Lazcano turned professional in July 1993 in Reseda, California on the undercard of a bill that included Shane Mosley and Mauro Gutierrez. On his debut he defeated Chris Crespin with a first round knockout.

=== Title fight ===
Lazcano won twelve of his first thirteen with eight victories coming via knockout. Then, in December 1996, Lazcano fought his first title fight against Californian Daniel Lujan for the vacant WBF lightweight title. The first fight between the two was judge a draw and they again faced each other in a rematch three months later. This time Lazcano emerged victorious with fourth-round knockout.

Lazcano took on Ricky Hatton at the city of Manchester stadium on May 24, a bout that Lazcano lost via unanimous decision. Lazcano dished out and received punishment from Hatton from start to finish. At one point Lazcano had Hatton visibly hurt. A moment in which a quick timeout was called by the referee so Hatton's corner could tie his shoe.

== Professional boxing record ==
43 fights	37 wins	5 losses
By knockout	27	1
By decision	10	4
Draws	1	

No.	Result	Record	Opponent	Type	Round, Time	Date	Location	Notes
43	Loss	37–5–1	Ricky Hatton	UD	12	May 24, 2008	City of Manchester Stadium, Manchester, England	For IBO and The Ring light welterweight titles
42	Loss	37–4–1	Vivian Harris	UD	12	Feb 10, 2007	Mandalay Bay, Paradise, Nevada, U.S.	
41	Win	37–3–1	Manuel Garnica	SD	10	Oct 21, 2006	Don Haskins Center, El Paso, Texas, U.S.	
40	Win	36–3–1	Ben Tackie	UD	10	Feb 24, 2006	Mandalay Bay, Paradise, Nevada, U.S.	
39	Win	35–3–1	Courtney Burton	KO	9 (10), 1:00	Nov 11, 2005	Aragon Ballroom, Chicago, Illinois, U.S.	
38	Win	34–3–1	Marco Angel Pérez	KO	1 (10), 1:52	Aug 19, 2005	Don Haskins Center, El Paso, Texas, U.S.	
37	Loss	33–3–1	José Luis Castillo	UD	12	Jun 5, 2004	MGM Grand Garden Arena, Paradise, Nevada, U.S.	For vacant WBC and The Ring lightweight titles
36	Win	33–2–1	Stevie Johnston	TKO	11 (12), 2:18	Sep 13, 2003	MGM Grand Garden Arena, Paradise, Nevada, U.S.	
35	Win	32–2–1	Danny Rios	TD	10 (12), 0:10	Feb 13, 2003	Don Haskins Center, El Paso, Texas, U.S.	Retained IBA lightweight title; Unanimous TD
34	Win	31–2–1	David Armstrong	TKO	6 (12), 1:33	Sep 20, 2002	Cohen Stadium, El Paso, Texas, U.S.	Retained IBA and NABF lightweight titles
33	Win	30–2–1	Benito Rodriguez	TKO	5 (12), 2:38	Jul 19, 2002	Feather Falls Casino, Oroville, California, U.S.	Retained IBA lightweight title
32	Win	29–2–1	Julio Sanchez Leon	RTD	7 (10), 3:00	Mar 8, 2002	Feather Falls Casino, Oroville, California, U.S.	
31	Win	28–2–1	Julio Alvarez	KO	4 (12), 1:00	Sep 1, 2001	Don Haskins Center, El Paso, Texas, U.S.	Retained IBA and NABF lightweight titles
30	Win	27–2–1	John John Molina	TKO	11 (12), 1:06	May 5, 2001	Don Haskins Center, El Paso, Texas, U.S.	Retained NABF lightweight title; Won vacant IBA lightweight title
29	Win	26–2–1	Volodymyr Matkivskyy	KO	5 (10), 2:20	Jan 19, 2001	ARCO Arena, Sacramento, California, U.S.	
28	Win	25–2–1	Dorin Spivey	TKO	8 (12), 1:57	Oct 27, 2000	Feather Falls Casino, Oroville, California, U.S.	Retained NABF lightweight title
27	Win	24–2–1	Jesse James Leija	SD	10	Aug 5, 2000	Mohegan Sun, Uncasville, Connecticut, U.S.	
26	Win	23–2–1	Wilfredo Vázquez	TKO	9 (12), 0:59	Jun 16, 2000	Mandalay Bay, Paradise, Nevada, U.S.	Won vacant NABF lightweight title
25	Win	22–2–1	Eduardo Perez	TKO	8 (10)	May 1, 2000	Radisson Hotel, Sacramento, California, U.S.	
24	Win	21–2–1	Julian Wheeler	SD	10	Jan 7, 2000	Sacramento Convention Center Complex, Sacramento, California, U.S.	
23	Win	20–2–1	Mark Fernandez	TKO	1 (10), 2:44	Dec 4, 1999	Chinook Winds Casino, Lincoln City, Oregon, U.S.	
22	Win	19–2–1	Jose Luis Montes	KO	2 (10), 0:50	Oct 12, 1999	Cache Creek Casino Resort, Brooks, California, U.S.	
21	Win	18–2–1	Ernesto Martinez	KO	4 (10), 1:00	Sep 1, 1999	Radisson Hotel, Sacramento, California, U.S.	
20	Win	17–2–1	Tialano Tovar	KO	2 (8), 1:07	Jul 17, 1999	Caesars Tahoe, Circus Maximus Showroom, Stateline, Nevada, U.S.	
19	Win	16–2–1	Martin Gallegos	TKO	2 (8), 1:39	Apr 1, 1999	Don Haskins Center, El Paso, Texas, U.S.	
18	Win	15–2–1	Olegario De Leon	TKO	4 (6)	Nov 19, 1998	Reseda Country Club, Reseda, Los Angeles, California, U.S.	
17	Loss	14–2–1	Golden Johnson	TKO	3 (10), 2:00	Jun 6, 1998	Arizona Charlie's Decatur, Las Vegas, Nevada, U.S.	
16	Win	14–1–1	James Crayton	MD	12	Jul 11, 1997	Tropicana Las Vegas, Paradise, Nevada, U.S.	Retained WBF lightweight title
15	Win	13–1–1	Daniel Lujan	KO	4 (12), 0:14	Feb 20, 1997	Reseda Country Club, Reseda, Los Angeles, U.S.	Won vacant WBF lightweight title
14	Draw	12–1–1	Daniel Lujan	MD	12	Dec 19, 1996	Reseda Country Club, Reseda, Los Angeles, California, U.S.	For vacant WBF lightweight title
13	Win	12–1	Antonio Díaz	MD	6	Sep 21, 1996	Aladdin Hotel & Casino, Paradise, Nevada, U.S.	
12	Win	11–1	Martin Gallegos	KO	5 (8), 2:59	Jun 22, 1996	El Paso, Texas, U.S.	
11	Win	10–1	Jerome Johnson	TKO	6 (8), 1:18	May 18, 1996	El Paso, Texas, U.S.	
10	Win	9–1	Juan Carlos Aranday	TKO	3 (?)	Apr 26, 1996	Ciudad Juárez, Chihuahua, Mexico	
9	Loss	8–1	Jose Manjarrez	UD	6	Jul 24, 1994	Grand Olympic Auditorium, Los Angeles, California, U.S.	
8	Win	8–0	Oscar Gonzalez	KO	2 (6)	May 18, 1994	Hollywood Palladium, Hollywood, California, U.S.	
7	Win	7–0	Joel Garcia	PTS	4	Mar 26, 1994	Fairplex, Pomona, California, U.S.	
6	Win	6–0	Pat Chavez	PTS	4	Dec 2, 1993	Marriott Hotel, Irvine, California, U.S.	
5	Win	5–0	Carlos Barragan	TKO	3 (4)	Nov 11, 1993	Registry Resort, Scottsdale, Arizona, U.S.	
4	Win	4–0	Gerardo Mercado	KO	1 (4), 1:20	Oct 16, 1993	Empire Polo Club, Indio, California, U.S.	
3	Win	3–0	Rudy Cruz	PTS	4	Aug 25, 1993	Hollywood Palladium, Hollywood, Los Angeles, California, U.S.	
2	Win	2–0	Jorge Castro	KO	1 (4)	Aug 4, 1993	Wyndham Hotels & Resorts, Scottsdale, Arizona, U.S.	
1	Win	1–0	Chris Crespin	KO	1 (4), 1:11	Jul 21, 1993	Reseda Country Club, Reseda, Los Angeles, California, U.S.	
