= Jesse James Leija =

American boxer (born 1966)

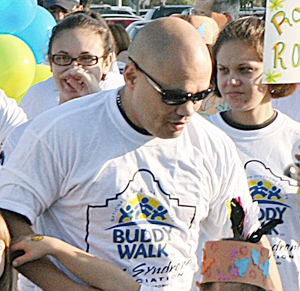
- Leija in 2009

Personal information
- Nickname: The Texas Tornado
- Born: James Leija; July 8, 1966 (age 60) San Antonio, Texas, U.S.
- Height: 5 ft 5 in (165 cm)
- Weight: Featherweight; Super featherweight; Lightweight; Light welterweight

Boxing career
- Reach: 66 in (168 cm)
- Stance: Orthodox

Boxing record
- Total fights: 57
- Wins: 47
- Win by KO: 19
- Losses: 7
- Draws: 2
- No contests: 1

James Leija (born July 8, 1966), best known as Jesse James Leija, is an American former professional boxer who competed from 1988 to 2005. He held the WBC super featherweight title in 1994, and challenged twice each for world titles at lightweight and light welterweight.

== Amateur career ==
Leija had an amateur career that spanned three years, going 23-5 during this time. He won the San Antonio Golden Gloves in 1988. Later that year he lost in the first rounds of the Olympic Trials to Kelcie Banks.

== Professional career ==
Jesse James Leija began his professional boxing career on October 2, 1988, beating Oscar Davis by knockout in round one, in Leija's native San Antonio. When he turned professional he took the name "Jesse James" in honor of his father, Jesse Leija, who trained him.

On January 21, 1989, he defeated Joe Mitchell by a decision in four at the Trump Plaza hotel in New Jersey. This marked Leija's debut outside Texas. On his fourth fight, Leija beat Manuel Gomez in San Antonio by decision in four, on April 10.

During the early 1990s, Leija won his first fifteen fights, ten by knockout. His first blemish came on October 8, 1990, when he and Edward Parker fought to a ten-round draw in San Antonio, TX.

Leija won his next three bouts, and then, he had an upgrade in opposition quality when he met the experienced Miguel Arrozal, on May 31, 1991. He beat Arrozal by an eighth-round disqualification. On October 18, he met Steve McCrory in Houston, beating McCrory by a ten-round decision.

Leija got his first championship try on the fight that proceeded his win over McCrory. On March 3, 1992. He met Jose Luis Martinez for the North American Boxing Federation bantamweight championship. This fight was held in San Antonio, and it resulted in a nine-round technical decision.

Leija proceeded to win three bouts, two of them against former world champions. Having defeated Jesus Poll by a decision in twelve rounds and Troy Dorsey by a knockout in six, he was matched, on March 23, 1993, with Louie Espinoza, a former two-time world featherweight champion. Leija won this fight by a twelve-round decision, and with this, the NABF title and the right to challenge for the world title for the first time.

=== Title fights against Nelson ===
On September 10, 1993, Leija participated at one of the Alamodome's first ever events, when he challenged Azumah Nelson for the WBC super featherweight title. After twelve rounds, Nelson had been announced as the winner by a split decision, only to find out twenty minutes later that a judge had miscalculated his scoring card, and the fight was really a draw.

On May 7, he got a rematch with Nelson. Leija became the WBC super featherweight champion when he defeated Nelson by a twelve-round unanimous decision in Las Vegas.

=== Losing the title and afterwards ===
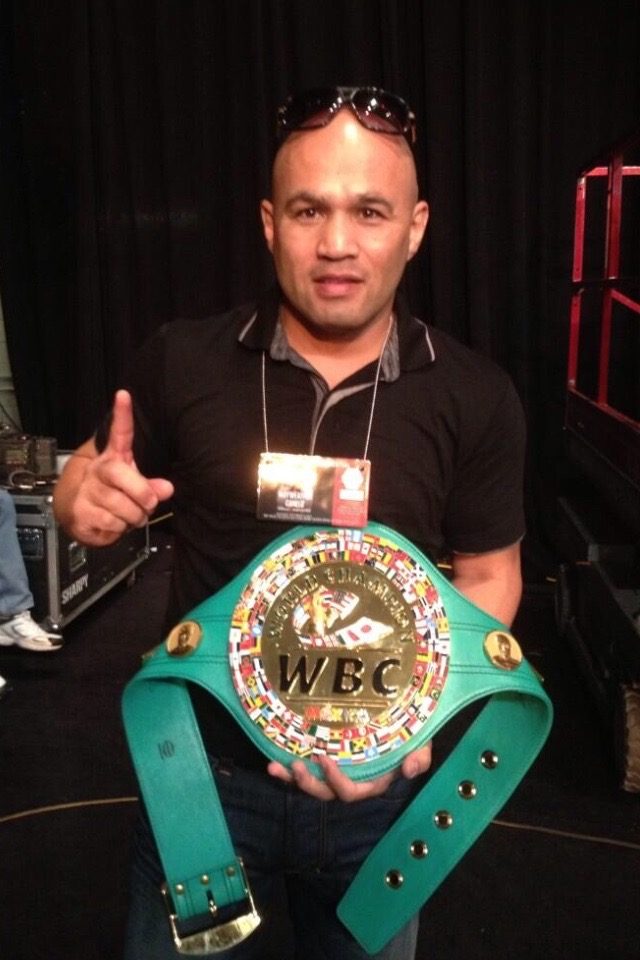
Leija with the WBC title, 2013

On September 17, he defended his title against Gabriel Ruelas, once again, in Las Vegas. Leija lost his world title when he lost to Ruelas by a twelve-round unanimous decision.

Leija rebounded with two wins, including one over Jeff Mayweather, and then, on December 15, 1995, he received a chance at becoming world champion for the second time, when he challenged Oscar De La Hoya for De La Hoya's WBO lightweight title, at Madison Square Garden. He lost by second-round knockout.

On June 1, 1996, Leija challenged Nelson, who had regained the WBC super featherweight title. Leija lost by a tech. knockout in six.

After a string of wins against relatively insignificant competition, Leija won the NABF lightweight title, defeating Joel Perez by a decision in twelve rounds on January 20, 1998.

After a second-round knockout victory over Troy Crain, Leija fought Nelson for the fourth time. In what was supposed to be Nelson's final career bout, Leija defeated Nelson by a twelve-round unanimous decision on July 11, 1998 (Nelson would later have a one-fight comeback against Jeff Fenech).

On November 14, Leija had a shot at the IBF lightweight title when he faced Shane Mosley. Leija was dropped in rounds six, eight and nine before the fight was stopped, with Mosley retaining the world title by a ninth-round knockout win.

Leija's next significant bout came on August 5, 2000, when he fought Juan Lazcano. Although no world championship was involved in this bout, it created general interest among Hispanic boxing fans, as Lazcano, nicknamed "The Hispanic Causing Panic," had become a popular boxer among Latinos. Leija lost an unpopular dec. in a ten-round split decision (scores of 94–96, 93-97 and a favorable 96-94) to Lazcano in Uncasville, Connecticut.

Next followed another HBO televised fight, when Leija fought Ivan Robinson, who had twice beaten Arturo Gatti, on November 11 at Las Vegas. Leija beat Robinson by a ten-round unanimous decision.

After a victory over Fred Ladd, Leija faced Hector Camacho Jr. in Long Island, July 7, 2001. This would prove to be a very controversial fight: after an accidental headbutt, Camacho Jr. was injured and he could not fight on. Camacho Jr. was initially announced as the winner by a technical decision, but the Leija team formally protested the result with the New York State Athletic Commission. The athletic commission decided to declare the fight a five-round no contest.

Micky Ward was being considered for a fight with WBC, WBA and IBF world light welterweight champion Kostya Tszyu. On January 5, 2002, Leija and Ward faced off at San Antonio. Once again, the fight was stopped as a consequence of a headbutt, but this time, it was Leija who was injured. Leija won the fight by a five-round technical decision, and became the number-one challenger to Tszyu.

Leija then proceeded to move to Australia for six months, to get acquainted with the country and its climate before his challenge of Tszyu, scheduled for January 19, 2003. Tszyu retained the title when he beat Leija by a six-round knockout.

After three wins, Leija faced young prospect Francisco Bojado. Leija and Bojado fought on July 24, 2004, in Atlantic City. Leija produced what some viewed as a minor upset by beating his much younger rival by a ten-round split decision.

=== Final bout ===
On January 29, 2005, Leija fought Arturo Gatti for Gatti's WBC light welterweight title. Fighting once again in Atlantic City, Leija lost to Gatti by a fifth-round knockout. Leija retired after the loss.

== Professional boxing record ==
57 fights	47 wins	7 losses
By knockout	19	5
By decision	27	2
By disqualification	1	0
Draws	2	
No contests	1	

No.	Result	Record	Opponent	Type	Round, time	Date	Location	Notes
57	Loss	47–7–2 (1)	Arturo Gatti	KO	5 (12), 1:48	Jan 29, 2005	Boardwalk Hall, Atlantic City, New Jersey, U.S.	For WBC light welterweight title
56	Win	47–6–2 (1)	Francisco Bojado	SD	10	Jul 24, 2004	Boardwalk Hall, Atlantic City, New Jersey, U.S.	
55	Win	46–6–2 (1)	Marteze Logan	TD	8 (10), 3:00	Apr 30, 2004	Dodge Arena, Hidalgo, Texas, U.S.	Unanimous TD after Leija was cut from an accidental head clash
54	Win	45–6–2 (1)	Fernando Mena	TKO	2 (10), 0:57	Nov 15, 2003	Alamodome, San Antonio, Texas, U.S.	
53	Win	44–6–2 (1)	Adan Casillas	TKO	4 (10), 0:57	May 22, 2003	SBC Center, San Antonio, Texas, U.S.	
52	Loss	43–6–2 (1)	Kostya Tszyu	RTD	6 (12), 3:00	Jan 19, 2003	Telstra Dome, Melbourne, Australia	For WBA (Super), WBC, IBF, and The Ring light welterweight titles
51	Win	43–5–2 (1)	Micky Ward	TD	5 (10), 3:00	Jan 5, 2002	Freeman Coliseum, San Antonio, Texas, U.S.	Split TD after Leija was cut from an accidental head clash
50	NC	42–5–2 (1)	Héctor Camacho Jr.	TD	3 (10), 3:00	Jul 7, 2001	KeySpan Park, New York City, New York, U.S.	Originally a unanimous TD win for Camacho, later ruled an NC after an incorrect timekeeper call
49	Win	42–5–2	Fred Ladd	TKO	3 (10), 0:55	Jan 7, 2001	Texas Station, North Las Vegas, Nevada, U.S.	
48	Win	41–5–2	Ivan Robinson	UD	10	Nov 11, 2000	Mandalay Bay Events Center, Paradise, Nevada, U.S.	
47	Loss	40–5–2	Juan Lazcano	SD	10	Aug 5, 2000	Mohegan Sun Arena, Montville, Connecticut, U.S.	
46	Win	40–4–2	Jorge Luis Lopez	KO	3 (10), 2:24	Apr 14, 2000	Freeman Coliseum, San Antonio, Texas, U.S.	
45	Win	39–4–2	Wayne Boudreaux	TD	5 (10), 1:48	Dec 2, 1999	Memorial Coliseum, Corpus Christi, Texas, U.S.	Unanimous TD after Leija was cut from an accidental head clash
44	Win	38–4–2	Verdell Smith	UD	10	Aug 20, 1999	Freeman Coliseum, San Antonio, Texas, U.S.	
43	Loss	37–4–2	Shane Mosley	RTD	9 (12), 3:00	Nov 14, 1998	Foxwoods Resort Casino, Ledyard, Connecticut, U.S.	For IBF lightweight title
42	Win	37–3–2	Azumah Nelson	UD	12	Jul 11, 1998	Alamodome, San Antonio, Texas, U.S.	Won vacant IBA lightweight title
41	Win	36–3–2	Troy Crain	KO	2 (10), 2:22	May 1, 1998	Freeman Coliseum, San Antonio, Texas, U.S.	
40	Win	35–3–2	Joel Perez	UD	12	Jan 20, 1998	Freeman Coliseum, San Antonio, Texas, U.S.	Retained NABF lightweight title
39	Win	34–3–2	Effie Schneider	UD	10	Nov 14, 1997	South Padre Island, Texas, U.S.	
38	Win	33–3–2	Jose Rodriguez	UD	8	Jun 14, 1997	Alamodome, San Antonio, Texas, U.S.	
37	Win	32–3–2	Joel Perez	UD	12	Mar 22, 1997	Memorial Coliseum, Corpus Christi, Texas, U.S.	Won vacant NABF lightweight title
36	Win	31–3–2	Roberto Avila	UD	10	Dec 10, 1996	Memorial Coliseum, Corpus Christi, Texas, U.S.	
35	Loss	30–3–2	Azumah Nelson	TKO	6 (12), 1:58	Jun 1, 1996	Boulder Station Hotel Casino, Sunrise Manor, Nevada, U.S.	For WBC super featherweight title
34	Loss	30–2–2	Oscar De La Hoya	RTD	2 (12), 3:00	Dec 15, 1995	Madison Square Garden, New York City, New York, U.S.	For WBO lightweight title
33	Win	30–1–2	Rodney Garnett	KO	7 (10), 2:12	Jul 29, 1995	Freeman Coliseum, San Antonio, Texas, U.S.	
32	Win	29–1–2	Jeff Mayweather	UD	10	May 2, 1995	Arizona Charlie's Decatur, Paradise, Nevada, U.S.	
31	Loss	28–1–2	Gabriel Ruelas	UD	12	Sep 17, 1994	MGM Grand Garden Arena, Paradise, Nevada, U.S.	Lost WBC super featherweight title
30	Win	28–0–2	Azumah Nelson	UD	12	May 7, 1994	MGM Grand Garden Arena, Paradise, Nevada, U.S.	Won WBC super featherweight title
29	Win	27–0–2	Tomas Valdez	TKO	3 (10), 2:19	Mar 23, 1994	HemisFair Arena, San Antonio, Texas, U.S.	
28	Draw	26–0–2	Azumah Nelson	SD	12	Sep 10, 1993	Alamodome, San Antonio, Texas, U.S.	For WBC super featherweight title
27	Win	26–0–1	Louie Espinoza	UD	12	Mar 23, 1993	HemisFair Arena, San Antonio, Texas, U.S.	Retained NABF featherweight title
26	Win	25–0–1	Gabriel Castro	UD	10	Dec 3, 1992	HemisFair Arena, San Antonio, Texas, U.S.	
25	Win	24–0–1	Troy Dorsey	RTD	5 (10), 3:00	Oct 3, 1992	HemisFair Arena, San Antonio, Texas, U.S.	
24	Win	23–0–1	Jesus Poll	PTS	10	Jul 15, 1992	HemisFair Arena, San Antonio, Texas, U.S.	
23	Win	22–0–1	Jose Luis Martinez	TD	9 (12)	Mar 3, 1992	HemisFair Arena, San Antonio, Texas, U.S.	Won NABF featherweight title; Unanimous TD after Leija was cut from an accidental head clash
22	Win	21–0–1	Steve McCrory	UD	10	Oct 18, 1991	Holiday Inn William P. Hobby Airport, Houston Texas, U.S.	
21	Win	20–0–1	Silvestre Castillo	TKO	2 (10), 2:32	Aug 30, 1991	Memorial Coliseum, Corpus Christi, Texas, U.S.	
20	Win	19–0–1	Miguel Arrozal	DQ	8 (10)	May 31, 1991	HemisFair Arena, San Antonio, Texas, U.S.	Arrozal disqualified for repeated low blows
19	Win	18–0–1	Rafael Soliman	UD	8	Apr 19, 1991	Convention Hall, Atlantic City, New Jersey, U.S.	
18	Win	17–0–1	Mark Fernandez	UD	10	Feb 25, 1991	Holiday Inn William P. Hobby Airport, Houston Texas, U.S.	
17	Win	16–0–1	Felipe de Jesus	UD	10	Jan 7, 1991	HemisFair Arena, San Antonio, Texas, U.S.	
16	Draw	15–0–1	Edward Parker	SD	10	Oct 8, 1990	HemisFair Arena, San Antonio, Texas, U.S.	
15	Win	15–0	Ricky Alvarez	TKO	1 (10), 2:00	Aug 13, 1990	Memorial Coliseum, Corpus Christi, Texas, U.S.	
14	Win	14–0	Bobby McCarthy	TKO	5 (8), 0:39	Jul 16, 1990	Dunes, Paradise, Nevada, U.S.	
13	Win	13–0	Boyd Gardner	UD	6	May 13, 1990	Memorial Coliseum, Corpus Christi, Texas, U.S.	
12	Win	12–0	Roy Muniz	KO	3	Mar 25, 1990	Memorial Coliseum, Corpus Christi, Texas, U.S.	
11	Win	11–0	Gary Spencer	KO	2	Mar 15, 1990	Fairmont Hotel, Dallas, Texas, U.S.	
10	Win	10–0	Joe Thompson	TKO	3	Jan 8, 1990	Tarrant County Convention Center, Fort Worth, Texas, U.S.	
9	Win	9–0	Carlos Flores	KO	4	Dec 11, 1989	Convention Center, Pasadena, Texas, U.S.	
8	Win	8–0	Tony De La Rosa	KO	1 (8)	Oct 16, 1989	Memorial Coliseum, Corpus Christi, Texas, U.S.	
7	Win	7–0	Jaime Castellano	TKO	3 (6)	Sep 11, 1989	Circus Maximus Showroom, Atlantic City, New Jersey, U.S.	
6	Win	6–0	Capri Lipkin	UD	6	Jul 24, 1989	Memorial Coliseum, Corpus Christi, Texas, U.S.	
5	Win	5–0	Chilo Guzman	PTS	6	May 29, 1989	County Coliseum, El Paso, Texas, U.S.	
4	Win	4–0	Manuel Gomez	UD	4	Apr 10, 1989	Memorial Coliseum, Corpus Christi, Texas, U.S.	
3	Win	3–0	Joe Mitchell	UD	4	Jan 21, 1989	Trump Plaza Hotel and Casino, Atlantic City, New Jersey, U.S.	
2	Win	2–0	Martin Melendez	TKO	2 (4), 1:36	Nov 3, 1988	Wyndham Hotel, San Antonio, Texas, U.S.	
1	Win	1–0	Oscar Davis	TKO	1 (4), 1:05	Oct 2, 1988	Freeman Coliseum, San Antonio, Texas, U.S.	

Sporting positions
Regional boxing titles
Preceded by Jose Luis Martinez	NABF featherweight champion March 3, 1992 – September 1993; Vacated	Vacant Title next held by Mario Gongoria
Vacant Title last held by Stevie Johnston	NABF lightweight champion March 22, 1997 – July 1998; Vacated	Vacant Title next held by Golden Johnson
Minor world boxing titles
New title	IBA lightweight champion July 11, 1998 – November 1998; Vacated	Vacant Title next held by Alejandro González
Major world boxing titles
Preceded by Azumah Nelson	WBC super featherweight champion May 7, 1994 – September 17, 1994	Succeeded by Gabriel Ruelas
