= Joel Díaz Jr. =

American boxer

Personal information
- Born: March 25, 1992 (age 34) Glendale, California, U.S.
- Height: 5 ft 8 in (173 cm)
- Weight: Super featherweight Lightweight

Boxing career
- Reach: 68 1/2 in (174 cm)
- Stance: Orthodox

Boxing record
- Total fights: 29
- Wins: 26
- Win by KO: 22
- Losses: 3

Joel Díaz Jr. (born March 25, 1992) is an American professional boxer.

== Amateur career ==
Díaz had an amateur record of 85 wins and 10 losses. Joel won seven amateur titles in the state of California.

== Professional career ==
He is trained by Abel Sanchez at the Summit Gym in Big Bear Lake, California. On July 17, 2010, Joel won his pro debut via second-round K.O. over the veteran Rene Torres. This bout was held at the Agua Caliente Casino in Rancho Mirage, California.
