= Diego Corrales =

American boxer (1977–2007)

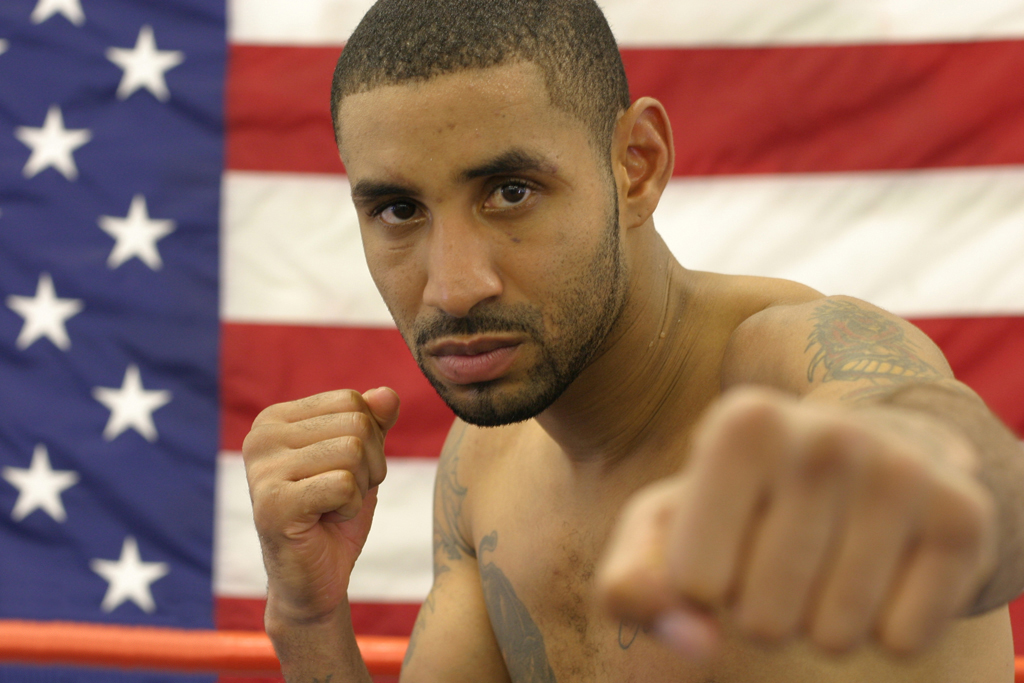
- Corrales in 2004

Personal information
- Nickname: Chico
- Born: August 25, 1977 Columbia, South Carolina, U.S.
- Died: May 7, 2007 (aged 29) Las Vegas, Nevada, U.S.
- Height: 5 ft 10 1/2 in (179 cm)
- Weight: Super featherweight; Lightweight

Boxing career
- Reach: 70 in (178 cm)
- Stance: Orthodox

Boxing record
- Total fights: 45
- Wins: 40
- Win by KO: 33
- Losses: 5

Diego "Chico" Corrales Jr. (August 25, 1977 – May 7, 2007) was an American professional boxer who competed from 1996 to 2007. He was a multiple-time world champion in two weight divisions, having held the International Boxing Federation (IBF) super featherweight title from 1999 to 2000; the World Boxing Organisation (WBO) super featherweight title in 2004; the WBO lightweight title from 2004 to 2006; and the World Boxing Council (WBC), and Ring magazine lightweight titles from 2005 to 2006.

In 2005, Corrales received Fight of the Year honors by The Ring and the Boxing Writers Association of America for his acclaimed first bout with José Luis Castillo.

Corrales was inducted into the International Boxing Hall of Fame as part of the class of 2024.

== Early life ==
Corrales was born in Columbia, South Carolina to a Colombian father, Diego Corrales Sr. and a Mexican mother. Corrales' early life was filled with violence; he was raised in the Oak Park section of Sacramento, was involved with street gangs at age 13, and witnessed his best friend's death via drive-by shooting. Corrales had a degree in culinary arts. He trained at "Sac Pal" (Sacramento Police Athletic League) Boxing Gym.

== Amateur career ==
Corrales compiled an amateur boxing record of 105–12. In 1994, he took second place at the United States Amateur Championships, losing to Frankie Carmona on points in the featherweight final. He reached the first round of the featherweight bracket at the 1995 Pan American Games, losing to Arnaldo Mesa. At the 1995 World Championships, he lost out on a medal after losing to Marco Rudolph in the lightweight bracket.

== Professional career ==
=== Super featherweight ===
==== Corrales vs. Mayweather ====
On January 20, 2001, Corrales challenged Ring No. 2 ranked Super Featherweight and #7 Pound-For-Pound Floyd Mayweather Jr. for the WBC super featherweight title and recorded his first knockdown and first loss. In the bout, Mayweather knocked down Corrales five times (three times in the seventh round and twice in the tenth). After the fifth knockdown, Corrales' corner stopped the fight, despite Corrales' protests.

Shortly after the Mayweather fight, Corrales served 14 months in prison after opting for a plea bargain on charges he faced for abusing his pregnant wife, Maria.

==== Corrales vs. Casamayor I & II ====
In 2003, Corrales returned to the ring. After easily winning four fights, Corrales fought against Ring No. 1 ranked Super Featherweight Joel Casamayor. After the sixth round, the fight was stopped because of a deep cut inside of Corrales' mouth. On March 6, 2004, there was a rematch for the vacant WBO super featherweight title. Corrales won by close split decision.

=== Lightweight ===
==== Corrales vs. Freitas ====
On August 7, 2004, Corrales fought former two-time Super Featherweight champion and current WBO Lightweight champion, Acelino Freitas, who came into the bout unbeaten. Corrales won the fight, via TKO in the tenth round, making Corrales a two weight champion. Freitas won the early rounds, but by the later rounds he was visibly tired and began to be caught by Corrales. After rising from his third knockdown, Freitas walked away from the referee and quit.

==== Corrales vs. Castillo I ====
On May 7, 2005, Corrales defeated WBC and Ring Lightweight champion José Luis Castillo via TKO in the tenth round, giving Corrales his fourth title in 2 weight classes. The fight is almost universally regarded as the best fight of 2005. Both men stood in front of each other, battering each other with hard combinations and power punches throughout the entire fight. Finally, in the tenth round, Castillo knocked Corrales down. Seconds later, Castillo knocked Corrales down again. Corrales managed to beat the count, and, after a point was taken away for excessive spitting out of the mouthpiece, Corrales connected with a punch that Castillo later called "a perfect right hand." Corrales then trapped Castillo against the ropes and landed numerous punches, causing the referee, Tony Weeks, to stop the fight.

==== Corrales vs. Castillo II ====
A rematch between Corrales and Castillo occurred on October 8, 2005. On the day before the fight, Castillo weighed-in 3½ lb over the 135 lb (61 kg) lightweight limit. Since Castillo did not make the weight, the fight became a non-title bout. The two fighters continued with the same fighting style that they had used in the first fight, trading inside punches throughout the first three rounds. Early in the fourth round, Castillo knocked down Corrales with a left hook to his chin. Corrales wobbled to his feet at the referee's count of ten, causing the fight to end.

Corrales vs. Castillo III, dubbed "The War to Settle the Score," had been scheduled for February 4, 2006, but it was postponed because of a rib injury that Corrales suffered while training. The fight was rescheduled for June 3, 2006. At the weigh-in, however, Corrales weighed the 135 lb (61 kg) lightweight limit whereas Castillo weighed 139½ lb—causing the fight to be cancelled. Corrales later sued Castillo for punitive damages.

==== Corrales vs. Casamayor III ====
Corrales was scheduled to defend his lightweight title in a third bout against Joel Casamayor on October 7, 2006. However, Corrales weighed in 5 pounds over the limit. He was given two hours to shed five pounds, but came back at 139 pounds. Corrales would have been stripped of the title if he had won the bout, but Casamayor defeated him by split decision for the WBC and The Ring lightweight titles.

On April 7, 2007, fighting in the welterweight division, Corrales lost a unanimous decision to Joshua Clottey. Corrales was dropped in rounds 9 and 10 and lost by the scores of 97–90, 98–89 and 100–87.

== Prison ==
Corrales served 14 months in the Deuel Vocational Institution, a correctional facility in San Joaquin County, California, after being convicted of domestic battery on his then pregnant girlfriend.

== Death ==
On May 7, 2007, exactly two years to the day after his first fight with Castillo, Corrales was killed in a three-vehicle accident near his Las Vegas home. Corrales was riding a 2007 Suzuki GSXR 1000 motorcycle, traveling northbound on Fort Apache Road in the southwest part of the Las Vegas Valley when he struck the back of a car and was thrown more than 100 feet (30 m) into oncoming traffic and struck by another vehicle. An ambulance was called by the witnesses at the scene, Corrales was rushed to a hospital but was pronounced dead on arrival. Las Vegas police spokesman Sgt. Tracy McDonald said: "The accident occurred at approximately 7:30 p.m. PDT." McDonald could not say how fast the motorcycle was traveling. Corrales' blood alcohol content was 0.25 at the time of the crash, approximately 3 times the legal limit for Nevada.

== Professional boxing record ==
45 fights	40 wins	5 losses
By knockout	33	3
By decision	7	2

No.	Result	Record	Opponent	Type	Round, time	Date	Location	Notes
45	Loss	40–5	Joshua Clottey	UD	10	Apr 7, 2007	Abou Ben Adhem Shrine Mosque, Springfield, Missouri, U.S.	
44	Loss	40–4	Joel Casamayor	SD	12	Oct 7, 2006	Mandalay Bay Events Center, Paradise, Nevada, U.S.	WBC and The Ring lightweight titles at stake; only for Casamayor as Corrales missed weight
43	Loss	40–3	Jose Luis Castillo	KO	4 (12), 0:47	Oct 8, 2005	Thomas & Mack Center, Paradise, Nevada, U.S.	
42	Win	40–2	José Luis Castillo	TKO	10 (12), 2:06	May 7, 2005	Mandalay Bay Events Center, Paradise, Nevada, U.S.	Retained WBO lightweight title; Won WBC and The Ring lightweight titles
41	Win	39–2	Acelino Freitas	TKO	10 (12), 1:24	Aug 7, 2004	Foxwoods Resort Casino, Ledyard, Connecticut, U.S.	Won WBO lightweight title
40	Win	38–2	Joel Casamayor	SD	12	Mar 6, 2004	Foxwoods Resort Casino, Ledyard, Connecticut, U.S.	Won IBA and vacant WBO super featherweight titles
39	Loss	37–2	Joel Casamayor	TKO	6 (12), 3:00	Oct 4, 2003	Mandalay Bay Events Center, Paradise, Nevada, U.S.	For vacant IBA super featherweight title
38	Win	37–1	Damian Fuller	KO	3 (10), 1:48	Jun 20, 2003	Home Depot Center, Carson, California, U.S.	
37	Win	36–1	Felix St Kitts	TKO	3 (10), 1:36	Apr 24, 2003	Grand Casino, Gulfport, Mississippi, U.S.	
36	Win	35–1	Roque Cassiani	RTD	1 (10), 3:00	Feb 22, 2003	The Pyramid, Memphis, Tennessee, U.S.	
35	Win	34–1	Michael Davis	TKO	5 (8)	Jan 25, 2003	Bally's Park Place, Atlantic City, New Jersey, U.S.	
34	Loss	33–1	Floyd Mayweather Jr.	TKO	10 (12), 2:19	Jan 20, 2001	MGM Grand Garden Arena, Paradise, Nevada, U.S.	For WBC super featherweight title
33	Win	33–0	Angel Manfredy	TKO	3 (12), 2:38	Sep 2, 2000	Don Haskins Center, El Paso, Texas, U.S.	Retained IBF and IBA super featherweight titles
32	Win	32–0	Justin Juuko	KO	10 (12), 2:35	Jun 17, 2000	Staples Center, Los Angeles, California, U.S.	Retained IBA super featherweight title
31	Win	31–0	Derrick Gainer	TKO	3 (12), 1:50	Mar 18, 2000	MGM Grand Garden Arena, Paradise, Nevada, U.S.	Retained IBF super featherweight title; Won vacant IBA super featherweight title
30	Win	30–0	John Brown	UD	12	Dec 4, 1999	Chinook Winds Casino, Lincoln City, Oregon, U.S.	Retained IBF super featherweight title
29	Win	29–0	Robert Garcia	TKO	7 (12), 0:48	Oct 23, 1999	MGM Grand Garden Arena, Paradise, Nevada, U.S.	Won IBF super featherweight title
28	Win	28–0	Angel Aldama	RTD	4 (12), 3:00	Jun 12, 1999	Fantasy Springs Resort Casino, Indio, California, U.S.	Won vacant IBA Intercontinental lightweight title
27	Win	27–0	Claudio Victor Martinet	TKO	5 (10), 2:06	Apr 2, 1999	Convention Center, Chattanooga, Tennessee, U.S.	
26	Win	26–0	Gairy St. Clair	UD	12	Dec 18, 1998	Yosemite Hall, Sacramento, California, U.S.	
25	Win	25–0	Hector Arroyo	TKO	5 (10), 1:01	Nov 20, 1998	The Orleans, Paradise, Nevada, U.S.	
24	Win	24–0	Benito Rodriguez	KO	6	Sep 12, 1998	Fantasy Springs Resort Casino, Indio, California, U.S.	
23	Win	23–0	Rafael Morfin	TKO	2	Aug 15, 1998	Grand Olympic Auditorium, Los Angeles, California, U.S.	
22	Win	22–0	Benito Rodriguez	TD	7 (8), 2:49	Jul 5, 1998	Fantasy Springs Resort Casino, Indio, California, U.S.	Unanimous TD after Rodriguez could not continue from an accidental low blow
21	Win	21–0	Eduardo Contreras	KO	2 (10), 1:12	May 30, 1998	Grand Olympic Auditorium, Los Angeles, California, U.S.	
20	Win	20–0	Juan Carlos Salazar	KO	1	Apr 18, 1998	Grand Olympic Auditorium, Los Angeles, California, U.S.	
19	Win	19–0	Angel Aldama	UD	10	Dec 4, 1997	Memorial Auditorium, Sacramento, California, U.S.	
18	Win	18–0	Juan Angel Macias	KO	6 (12), 2:35	Oct 18, 1997	Star of the Desert Arena, Primm, Nevada, U.S.	Retained IBA Intercontinental lightweight title
17	Win	17–0	Isagani Pumar	KO	4 (10), 2:28	Aug 22, 1997	Memorial Auditorium, Sacramento, California, U.S.	
16	Win	16–0	Manny Castillo	TKO	11 (12) 0:48	Jul 11, 1997	Memorial Auditorium, Sacramento, California, U.S.	Won vacant IBA Intercontinental lightweight title
15	Win	15–0	Javier Pichardo	KO	2 (12), 2:47	May 9, 1997	The Orleans, Paradise, Nevada, U.S.	Retained IBA Intercontinental super featherweight title
14	Win	14–0	Steve Quinonez	TKO	4 (12), 2:21	Apr 4, 1997	The Orleans, Paradise, Nevada, U.S.	Won vacant IBA Intercontinental super featherweight title
13	Win	13–0	Idelfonso Bernal	TKO	2 (6), 0:34	Mar 14, 1997	Veterans Memorial Coliseum, Phoenix, Arizona, U.S.	
12	Win	12–0	Salvador Montes	KO	1 (6)	Jan 13, 1997	Great Western Forum, Inglewood, California, U.S.	
11	Win	11–0	Julian Vasquez	KO	1	Dec 16, 1996	Tijuana, Mexico	
10	Win	10–0	Mario Gonzalez	KO	1	Dec 13, 1996	Tecate, Mexico	
9	Win	9–0	Juan Santos	TKO	1	Nov 29, 1996	Tijuana, Mexico	
8	Win	8–0	Sergio Macias	TKO	4 (4), 1:46	Oct 11, 1996	Texas Station, North Las Vegas, Nevada, U.S.	
7	Win	7–0	Murphy Hughes	KO	1 (4), 2:52	Sep 13, 1996	Knapp Center, Des Moines, Iowa, U.S.	
6	Win	6–0	Cesar Morales	TKO	2 (4)	Aug 17, 1996	Sports Stadium, Albuquerque, New Mexico, U.S.	
5	Win	5–0	Lorenzo Raul Chaires	KO	1 (4)	Jun 27, 1996	Phoenix, Arizona, U.S.	
4	Win	4–0	Ciro Canales	UD	4	Jun 7, 1996	Caesars Palace, Paradise, Nevada, U.S.	
3	Win	3–0	Victor Manuel Mendoza	TKO	3 (4), 2:59	May 30, 1996	Celebrity Theatre, Phoenix, Arizona, U.S.	
2	Win	2–0	Enrique Beltran	UD	4	Mar 28, 1996	Celebrity Theatre, Phoenix, Arizona, U.S.	
1	Win	1–0	Everett Barry	TKO	3 (4), 1:12	Mar 19, 1996	Club Rio, Tempe, Arizona, U.S.	

== Titles in boxing ==
=== Major world titles ===
- IBF super featherweight champion (130 lbs)
- WBO super featherweight champion (130 lbs)
- WBC lightweight champion (135 lbs)
- WBO lightweight champion (135 lbs)

=== The Ring magazine titles ===
- The Ring lightweight champion (135 lbs)

=== Minor world titles ===
- IBA super featherweight champion (130 lbs) (2x)

=== Regional/International titles ===
- IBA Intercontinental super featherweight champion (130 lbs)
- IBA Intercontinental lightweight champion (135 lbs) (2x)

== See also ==
- Cameron Dunkin - Corrales' manager

Sporting positions
Regional boxing titles
New title	IBA Intercontinental super featherweight champion April 4, 1997 – July 11, 1997; Won lightweight title	Vacant Title next held by Patrick Hyland
New title	IBA Intercontinental lightweight champion July 11, 1997 – July 1998; Vacated	Vacant Title next held by Gabriel Ruelas
Vacant Title last held by Gabriel Ruelas	IBA Intercontinental lightweight champion June 12, 1999 – March 2000; Vacated	Vacant Title next held by Josh O'Reilly
Minor world boxing titles
Vacant Title last held by José Luis Castillo	IBA super featherweight champion March 18, 2000 – 2000; Vacated	Vacant Title next held by Joel Casamayor
Preceded by Joel Casamayor	IBA super featherweight champion March 6, 2004 – August 2004; Vacated	Vacant Title next held by Érik Morales
Major world boxing titles
Preceded by Robert Garcia	IBF super featherweight champion October 23, 1999 – October 22, 2000; Vacated	Vacant Title next held by Steve Forbes
Vacant Title last held by Acelino Freitas	WBO super featherweight champion March 6, 2004 – June 18, 2004; Vacated	Vacant Title next held by Mike Anchondo
Preceded by Acelino Freitas	WBO lightweight champion August 7, 2004 – January 14, 2006; Vacated	Vacant Title next held by Acelino Freitas
Preceded by José Luis Castillo	WBC lightweight champion May 7, 2005 – October 6, 2006; Stripped	Vacant Title next held by Joel Casamayor
Preceded by José Luis Castillo	The Ring lightweight champion May 7, 2005 – October 6, 2006; Stripped	Vacant Title next held by Joel Casamayor
Awards
Previous: Marco Antonio Barrera vs. Erik Morales III	The Ring Fight of the Year vs. José Luis Castillo; 2005	Next: Somsak Sithchatchawal vs. Mahyar Monshipour
Status
Previous: Pedro Alcázar	Latest born world champion to die May 7, 2007 – April 19, 2010	Next: Edwin Valero
