= José Luis Castillo vs. Diego Corrales =

Boxing competition

- Date: May 7, 2005
- Venue: Mandalay Bay Events Center, Paradise, Nevada, U.S.
- Title(s) on the line: WBC, WBO, and The Ring lightweight titles

Tale of the tape
| Boxer | José Luis Castillo | Diego Corrales |
| Nickname | El Temible ("The Fearsome") | Chico |
| Hometown | Empalme, Sonora, Mexico | Sacramento, California, U.S. |
| Pre-fight record | 52–6–1 (46 KO) | 39–2 (32 KO) |
| Age | 31 years, 4 months | 27 years, 8 months |
| Height | 5 ft 7 1/2 in (171 cm) | 5 ft 10 1/2 in (179 cm) |
| Weight | 135 lb (61 kg) | 135 lb (61 kg) |
| Style | Orthodox | Orthodox |
| Recognition | WBC and The Ring; Lightweight Champion; The Ring No. 9 ranked pound-for-pound fighter | WBO; Lightweight Champion; The Ring; No. 1 Ranked Lightweight |

Result
- Corrales wins via 10th round TKO

José Luis Castillo vs. Diego Corrales was a boxing match in Las Vegas, Nevada, US, on May 7, 2005. Corrales won the fight in the tenth round after himself being knocked down twice in the round.

== Background ==
The fight was a 12-round lightweight unification bout between Corrales and Castillo. Corrales, who had a career record of 39–2 with 32 knockouts, was the World Boxing Organization (WBO) champion. Castillo, at 52–6–1 with 46 knockouts, was the World Boxing Council (WBC) champion. Castillo's style was to fight inside. Corrales' trainer, Joe Goossen, told Corrales to fight inside, as well.

== Fight ==
Both men stood in front of each other, battering each other with hard combinations and power punches throughout the entire match. In the fourth round, a cut opened above Castillo's left eye. Corrales had welts under both of his eyes, and his left eye started to swell shut in the seventh round. Through nine, neither man had been knocked down.

Less than 30 seconds into the tenth round, Castillo hit Corrales on the chin and knocked him down. Corrales spat out his mouthpiece and rose at eight of referee Tony Weeks' count. Seconds later, Castillo knocked Corrales down again. Corrales took his mouthpiece out and rose at nine. Weeks deducted a point from Corrales for excessive spitting out of the mouthpiece. When the fight resumed, Corrales connected with a punch that Castillo later called "a perfect right hand". Corrales then trapped Castillo against the ropes and landed numerous punches that appeared to knock Castillo out on his feet, causing Weeks to stop the fight.

Corrales and Castillo both went to the hospital afterwards. According to Goossen, "The beating Diego got from Castillo's body punches was unbelievable. They took a urine sample and it looked like a bottle of tomato juice." The fight was almost universally regarded as the best fight of 2005.

Unbelievable! Ebb and flow! They're all standing here at Mandalay Bay! Corrales coming back after being on the canvas twice here in the 10th! Now, Castillo steps back! Corrales waning! Castillo's in trouble! Weeks steps in, and the fight is over! Corrales with a remarkable dramatic turnaround to win this fight! Unbelievable! Diego Corrales said he would go through hell before losing this fight. He may have.

— Steve Albert calling the end of the fight on Showtime

== Aftermath ==
Corrales never won another boxing match. A rematch between him and Castillo occurred on October 8, 2005. On the day before the fight, Castillo weighed-in 1 1/2 lb over the 135 lb (61 kg) lightweight limit. Since Castillo did not make the weight, the fight became a non-title bout. The two fighters continued with the same fighting style that they had used in the first fight, trading inside punches throughout the first three rounds. Early in the fourth round, Castillo knocked down Corrales with a left hook to his chin. Corrales wobbled to his feet at the referee's count of ten, causing the fight to end. A third fight between the two was scheduled, but never took place, due to Castillo again coming in overweight and Corrales not willing to have to try to overcome a weight disadvantage again.

On May 7, 2007, exactly two years after the first fight, Corrales died in a motorcycle accident. Castillo continued his career before retiring in 2014.

== Undercard ==
- (Mexico) Juan Manuel Márquez defeats (Colombia) Victor Polo via unanimous decision, retaining WBA featherweight and IBF featherweight titles

| Preceded by vs. Julio Díaz | José Luis Castillo's bouts May 7, 2005 | Succeeded by Rematch |
| Preceded by vs. Acelino Freitas | Diego Corrales' bouts May 7, 2005 | Succeeded by Rematch |
Awards
| Preceded by Erik Morales vs. Marco Antonio Barrera III | The Ring Fight of the Year; 2005 | Succeeded by Somsak Sithchatchawal vs. Mahyar Monshipour |
| Preceded by Erik Morales vs. Marco Antonio Barrera III | The Ring Round of the Year; Round 10; 2005 | Succeeded by Somsak Sithchatchawal vs. Mahyar Monshipour |
| Preceded by Erik Morales vs. Marco Antonio Barrera III | Harry Markson Award; 2005 | Succeeded by Somsak Sithchatchawal vs. Mahyar Monshipour |
