= José Luis Castillo =

Mexican boxer (born 1973)

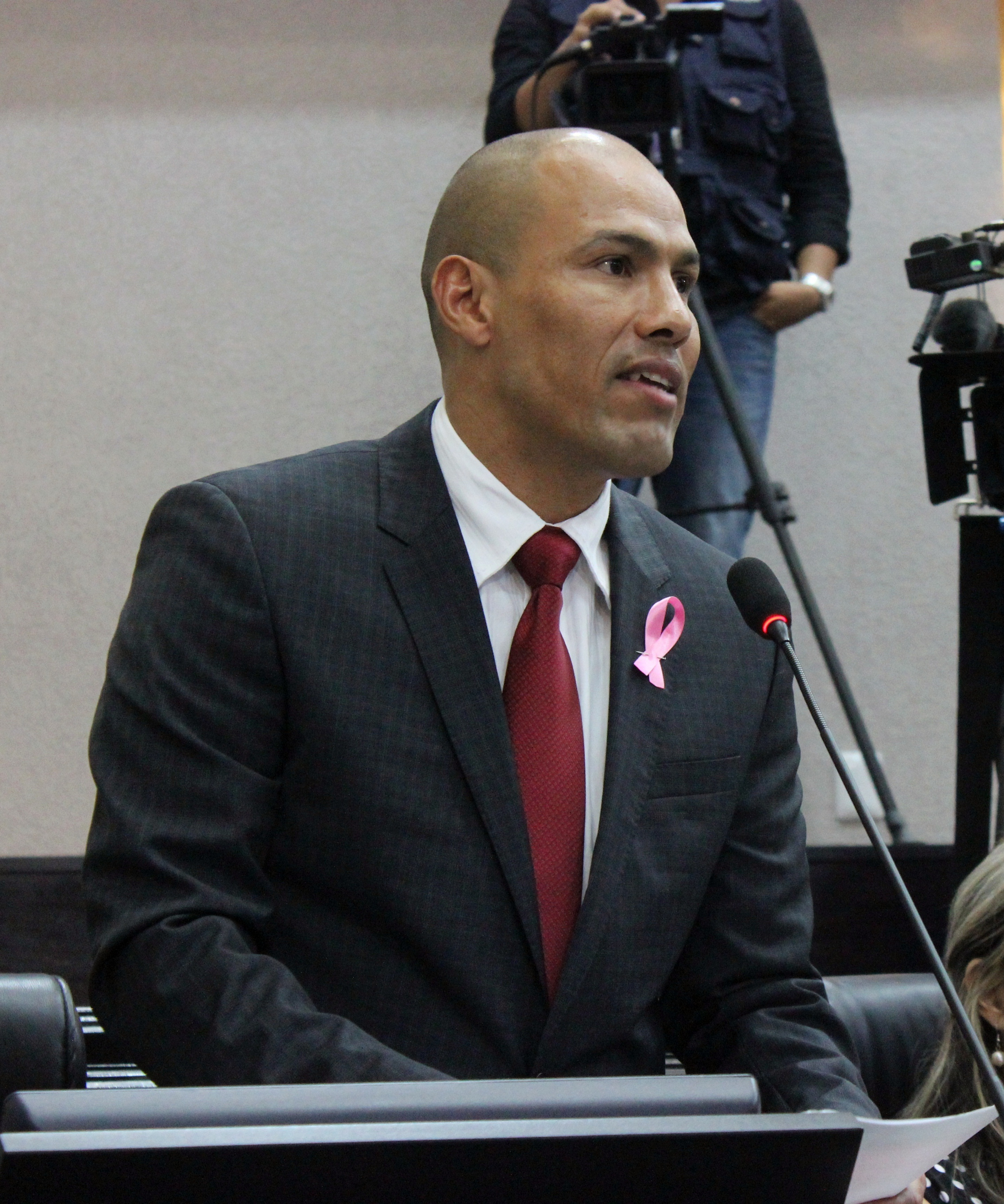
- Castillo in 2015

Personal information
- Nickname: El Temible ("The Fearsome")
- Born: December 14, 1973 (age 52) Empalme, Sonora, Mexico
- Height: 5 ft 7 1/2 in (171 cm)
- Weight: Featherweight; Super featherweight; Lightweight; Light welterweight; Welterweight

Boxing career
- Reach: 69 in (175 cm)
- Stance: Orthodox

Boxing record
- Total fights: 80
- Wins: 66
- Win by KO: 57
- Losses: 13
- Draws: 1

José Luis Castillo (born December 14, 1973) is a Mexican former professional boxer who competed from 1990 to 2014. Generally considered one of the best lightweights of his era, he is a two-time world champion at that weight, having held the WBC title twice, from 2000 to 2002 and 2004 to 2005; and the Ring magazine and lineal titles from 2004 to 2005. Castillo is best known for his 2005 fight against Diego Corrales, for which he received Fight of the Year awards by both The Ring and the Boxing Writers Association of America, as well as his much-debated first fight with Floyd Mayweather Jr.

== Professional career ==
=== Lightweight ===
==== Castillo vs. Johnston I & II ====
In 2000, having two straight wins over Jorge Paez and Steve Quinonez, Castillo challenged WBC lightweight titleholder and Ring No. 1 ranked Lightweight Stevie Johnston. Heavily favored as underdog, Castillo was slated to lose. Instead, Castillo scored the Ring Magazine Upset of the Year, defeating Johnston by a majority decision, in what was a very close fight. Three months later, they fought to a draw, memorable because miscalculation adding the scores led to an original announcement of Johnston regaining his title, which Castillo learned about when Johnston showed up in his dressing room to return the strap.

After fighting Johnston, Castillo defended his title against Ring Top 10 Lightweight, César Bazán. Castillo defeated Bazan by 6th-round TKO, dropping Bazan in the 5th and 6th rounds.

==== Castillo vs. Mayweather I ====
In his first bout with undefeated American junior lightweight champion Floyd Mayweather Jr., Castillo started slow but gradually lured the flashy boxer into a toe to toe battle. Castillo had great success in the middle rounds, when he cut off the ring and used his strength to try wearing down Mayweather. As the fight progressed, Castillo's power and pressure seemed to turn the fight in his favor, having tremendous success with body punching while Mayweather became more stationary, allowing the stronger Castillo to do significant work. Castillo closed the fight strong, outlanding Mayweather 35-20 in the 11th round and totally dominated the 12th. Punch stats showed Castillo with lopsided totals in every category; punches landed, thrown & power punches landed & thrown and overall connect percentages. Despite the clear advantages numerically, Castillo’s slow start cost him the fight as he only won 1 of the first 6 rounds. Judge Jerry Roth and John Keane scored it 115-111, and judge Anek Hongtongkam scored it 116-111, all for Mayweather, a decision that was loudly booed by the crowd. The HBO announce team loudly voiced its disapproval of the verdict, with unofficial scorer Harold Lederman having Castillo winning 115-111. Ultimately the fight was close enough to the Mayweather team that a rematch was signed.

==== Castillo vs. Mayweather II ====
After Mayweather's successful shoulder surgery, Castillo re-matched with Mayweather. Mayweather used his quick footwork, combinations and his jab specialty to coast to another unanimous decision victory, this time with all analysts in agreement, including Harold Lederman. The smaller Mayweather was again outweighed by Castillo on the night of the fight, as Castillo weighed 147 and Mayweather weighed 138.

==== Castillo vs. Lazcano ====
On June 5, 2004, Castillo regained the Lightweight title and won the vacant Ring Lightweight title by defeating Ring No. 1 ranked Lightweight, Juan Lazcano. Castillo won the fight by unanimous decision, by the scores of 117-111, 116-112, and 115-113.

==== Castillo vs. Casamayor ====
In Castillo's first title defense, he fought former Super Featherweight and future Lightweight champion, Joel Casamayor. In what was a very close fight, Castillo was awarded the close and controversial split decision. The scores were 116-112 and 117-111 for Castillo, and 115-113 for Casamayor. Castillo's next fight was a title defense against Ring Top 10 Lightweight, Julio Díaz, which Castillo won by TKO in the 10th round.

==== Castillo vs. Corrales I ====
On May 7, 2005, Castillo fought WBO Lightweight champion and Ring No. 1 ranked Lightweight, Diego Corrales. Corrales defeated José Luis Castillo for the WBC lightweight title via TKO in the tenth round. The fight is almost universally regarded as the best fight of 2005. Both men stood in front of each other, battering each other with hard combinations and power punches throughout the entire fight. Finally, in the tenth round, Castillo knocked Corrales down. Seconds later, Castillo knocked Corrales down again. Once on the ground, Corrales managed to beat the count, and, after a point was taken away for excessive spitting out of the mouthpiece, Corrales connected with a punch that Castillo later called "a perfect right hand." Corrales then trapped Castillo against the ropes and landed numerous punches, causing the referee, Tony Weeks, to stop the fight.

==== Castillo vs. Corrales II ====
A rematch between Corrales and Castillo occurred on October 8, 2005. On the day before the fight, Castillo weighed-in 3½ lb over the 135 lb (61 kg) lightweight limit. Since Castillo did not make the weight, the fight became a non-title bout. The two fighters continued with the same fighting style that they had used in the first fight, trading inside punches throughout the first three rounds. Early in the fourth round, Castillo knocked down Corrales with a left hook to his chin. Corrales wobbled to his feet at the referee's count of ten, causing the fight to end.

Corrales vs. Castillo III, dubbed "The War to Settle the Score," had been scheduled for February 4, 2006, but it was postponed because of a rib injury that Corrales suffered while training. The fight was rescheduled for June 3, 2006. At the weigh-in, however, Corrales weighed the 135 lb (61 kg) lightweight limit whereas Castillo weighed 139½ lb—causing the fight to be cancelled. Corrales later sued Castillo for punitive damages.

=== Light welterweight ===
On January 20, 2007, Castillo won a narrow split decision over Herman Ngoudjo. On June 23, he fought Ricky Hatton in Las Vegas. Castillo was KO'd 2 minutes and 16 seconds into the fourth round by a crunching left hook to the ribs, one of the few times a top ranked boxer of Castillo's caliber has been KO'ed by a bodyshot and reminiscent of the bout between Roy Jones Jr. and Virgil Hill. Prior to the knockout Castillo had been deducted a point for low blows to his opponent.

Castillo was scheduled to fight Timothy Bradley in 2008 for the right to be number 1 contender to the WBC Super lightweight title, but during the weigh-in on March 8, 2008, Castillo weighed 147½ pounds (7 pounds over the super-lightweight limit). Bradley instead faced and defeated Junior Witter for the title.

=== Welterweight ===
On the Pacquiao vs Clottey undercard on March 14, 2010, Alfonso Gomez and Castillo clashed for Gomez' WBC Continental Americas welterweight title. Ringside reporters have said that the fight was to see if Castillo had it anymore, and for this type of fight such a minor title is nearly an insult. Castillo lost in round 5 by TKO (not answering to the bell). After the bout Castillo announced his retirement, stating, "I just found out tonight I don't have it anymore, I want to apologize to the public and I am definitely announcing my retirement."

After announcing his retirement in March 2010, Castillo returned to action in a fight against Roberto Valenzuela on June 18, 2010 and won the bout by unanimous decision. The match was held at the Auditorio Municipal in Tijuana, Baja California, Mexico

== Professional boxing record ==
80 fights	66 wins	13 losses
By knockout	57	8
By decision	9	5
Draws	1	

No.	Result	Record	Opponent	Type	Round, time	Date	Location	Notes
80	Loss	66–13–1	Ruslan Provodnikov	TKO	5 (12), 2:09	Nov 28, 2014	Luzhniki, Moscow, Russia	
79	Win	66–12–1	José Luis Payan	TKO	5 (10), 1:13	May 30, 2014	Gimnasio Carlos Hernández Carrera, Nogales, Mexico	
78	Win	65–12–1	Felix Bojorquez	TKO	5 (10), 0:53	Mar 21, 2014	Gimnasio del Estado, Hermosillo, Mexico	
77	Loss	64–12–1	Antwone Smith	UD	10	Feb 1, 2013	UIC Pavilion, Chicago, Illinois, U.S.	
76	Win	64–11–1	Iván Popoca	RTD	8 (10), 3:00	Jul 13, 2012	UIC Pavilion, Chicago, Illinois, U.S.	
75	Win	63–11–1	Sammy Ventura	TKO	2 (10), 2:52	Nov 26, 2011	Campo Futbol Colosio, Playa del Carmen, Mexico	
74	Loss	62–11–1	Jorge Páez Jr.	UD	12	Mar 25, 2011	Gimnasio de Mexicali, Mexicali, Mexico	For vacant WBC FECARBOX welterweight title
73	Win	62–10–1	Daniel Eduardo Yocupicio	TKO	2 (10), 1:28	Aug 7, 2010	Estadio De Béisbol Héctor Espino, Hermosillo, Mexico	
72	Win	61–10–1	Roberto Valenzuela	UD	8	Jun 18, 2010	Auditorio Municipal, Tijuana, Mexico	
71	Loss	60–10–1	Alfonso Gómez	RTD	6 (12), 0:10	Mar 13, 2010	Cowboys Stadium, Arlington, Texas, U.S.	For WBC Continental Americas welterweight title
70	Win	60–9–1	Carlos Urías	TKO	2 (8), 2:59	Sep 12, 2009	Palenque de Feria, Tepic, Mexico	
69	Win	59–9–1	Christian Solano	TKO	3 (10), 1:51	Aug 22, 2009	Auditorio Unidad Deportiva, Los Cabos, Mexico	
68	Win	58–9–1	Roberto Valenzuela	KO	6 (10), 1:40	Jul 25, 2009	Palenque del Recinto Ferial, Nuevo Vallarta, Mexico	
67	Win	57–9–1	James Wayka	TKO	2 (10), 1:13	Jan 17, 2009	Centro de Espectáculos Promocasa, Mexicali, Mexico	
66	Loss	56–9–1	Sebastián Luján	UD	10	Jul 30, 2008	Sycuan Resort & Casino, El Cajon, California, U.S.	
65	Win	56–8–1	Adan Casillas	TKO	6 (10), 2:38	Oct 27, 2007	Centro de Espectáculos Promocasa, Mexicali, Mexico	
64	Loss	55–8–1	Ricky Hatton	KO	4 (12), 2:16	Jun 23, 2007	Thomas & Mack Center, Paradise, Nevada, U.S.	For IBO, The Ring, and vacant WBC International light welterweight titles
63	Win	55–7–1	Herman Ngoudjo	SD	12	Jan 20, 2007	Paris Las Vegas, Paradise, Nevada, U.S.	Won WBC-NABF light welterweight title
62	Win	54–7–1	Rolando Reyes	UD	12	Feb 4, 2006	Don Haskins Center, El Paso, Texas, U.S.	
61	Win	53–7–1	Diego Corrales	KO	4 (12), 0:47	Oct 8, 2005	Thomas & Mack Center, Paradise, Nevada, U.S.	
60	Loss	52–7–1	Diego Corrales	TKO	10 (12), 2:06	May 7, 2005	Mandalay Bay Events Center, Paradise, Nevada, U.S.	Lost WBC and The Ring lightweight titles; For WBO lightweight title
59	Win	52–6–1	Julio Díaz	TKO	10 (12), 2:23	Mar 5, 2005	Mandalay Bay Events Center, Paradise, Nevada, U.S.	Retained WBC and The Ring lightweight titles
58	Win	51–6–1	Joel Casamayor	SD	12	Dec 4, 2004	Mandalay Bay Events Center, Paradise, Nevada, U.S.	Retained WBC and The Ring lightweight titles
57	Win	50–6–1	Juan Lazcano	UD	12	Jun 5, 2004	MGM Grand Garden Arena, Paradise, Nevada, U.S.	Won vacant WBC and The Ring lightweight titles
56	Win	49–6–1	Derrick Parks	TKO	2 (10), 2:37	Feb 13, 2004	Edgewater Hotel and Casino, Laughlin, Nevada, U.S.	
55	Win	48–6–1	Saul Duran	TKO	8 (10), 1:47	Oct 10, 2003	Jacob Brown Auditorium, Brownsville, Texas, U.S.	
54	Win	47–6–1	Gustavo Corral	KO	5 (10), 0:33	Jun 14, 2003	Arrowhead Pond, Anaheim, California, U.S.	
53	Loss	46–6–1	Floyd Mayweather Jr.	UD	12	Dec 7, 2002	Mandalay Bay Events Center, Paradise, Nevada, U.S.	For WBC and The Ring lightweight titles
52	Win	46–5–1	Verdell Smith	KO	3 (10)	Aug 3, 2002	Centro de Usos Múltiples, Hermosillo, Mexico	
51	Loss	45–5–1	Floyd Mayweather Jr.	UD	12	Apr 20, 2002	MGM Grand Garden Arena, Paradise, Nevada, U.S.	Lost WBC lightweight title; For vacant The Ring lightweight title
50	Win	45–4–1	Juan Angel Macias	TKO	8 (10), 1:04	Jan 25, 2002	Avi Resort & Casino, Laughlin, Nevada, U.S.	
49	Win	44–4–1	Fred Ladd	TKO	4 (10)	Aug 24, 2001	Mexicali, Mexico	
48	Win	43–4–1	Seung-Ho Yuh	KO	1 (12), 1:53	Jun 16, 2001	Centro de Usos Múltiples, Hermosillo, Mexico	Retained WBC lightweight title
47	Win	42–4–1	César Bazán	TKO	6 (12), 2:54	Jan 20, 2001	MGM Grand Garden Arena, Paradise, Nevada, U.S.	Retained WBC lightweight title
46	Draw	41–4–1	Stevie Johnston	MD	12	Sep 15, 2000	Pepsi Center, Denver, Colorado, U.S.	Retained WBC lightweight title
45	Win	41–4	Stevie Johnston	MD	12	Jun 17, 2000	The Bicycle Casino, Bell Gardens, California, U.S.	Won WBC lightweight title
44	Win	40–4	Steve Quinonez	UD	10	Apr 8, 2000	Blancas Bazaar, Imperial Beach, California, U.S.	
43	Win	39–4	Jorge Páez	TKO	5 (12), 1:04	Oct 16, 1999	Plaza de Toros Calafia, Mexicali, Mexico	Won vacant IBA super featherweight title
42	Win	38–4	Sandro Marcos	KO	8 (12)	Aug 14, 1999	Guaymas, Mexico	Won vacant Mexico super featherweight title
41	Win	37–4	Cristino Mota	RTD	3 (10)	Jul 10, 1999	Plaza de Toros Calafia, Mexicali, Mexico	
40	Win	36–4	Pablo Valenzuela	KO	4 (10)	Jun 4, 1999	Palenque del Parque Vicente Guerrero, Mexicali, Mexico	
39	Win	35–4	Julian Romero	UD	6	Apr 1, 1999	Don Haskins Center, El Paso, Texas, U.S.	
38	Win	34–4	Eduardo Montes	KO	3 (12)	Feb 19, 1999	Palenque del Parque Vicente Guerrero, Mexicali, Mexico	
37	Loss	33–4	Julio Alvarez	TKO	10 (12)	Oct 3, 1998	Mexico City, Mexico	For vacant Mexico super featherweight title
36	Win	33–3	Julio Sanchez Leon	TKO	8 (12)	Apr 17, 1998	Auditorio del Estado, Mexicali, Mexico	Retained Mexico featherweight title
35	Win	32–3	Hector Javier Marquez	TKO	10 (12)	Sep 12, 1997	Guaymas, Mexico	Retained Mexico featherweight title
34	Win	31–3	Rafael Olvera	KO	7 (12)	Jul 4, 1997	Gimnasio Municipal Josue Neri Santos, Ciudad Juárez, Mexico	Won Mexico featherweight title
33	Win	30–3	Javier Renteria	KO	1 (10)	Mar 8, 1997	Estadio Arquitecto Ricardo Etcheverry, Mexicali, Mexico	
32	Win	29–3	Jesus Castaneda	KO	2 (12)	Jan 1, 1997	Salón Casa Blanca, Mexicali, Mexico	Retained Mexican Pacific Coast super featherweight title
31	Win	28–3	Jaime Fernandez	KO	1 (12)	Dec 13, 1996	Palenque del Parque Vicente Guerrero, Mexicali, Mexico	Retained Mexican Pacific Coast super featherweight title
30	Win	27–3	Roberto Valenzuela	KO	6 (6)	Oct 12, 1996	Arrowhead Pond, Anaheim, California, U.S.	
29	Win	26–3	Jose Luis Montes	KO	7 (12)	Sep 20, 1996	Centro de Espectáculos Rancho Grande, Mexicali, Mexico	Retained Mexican Pacific Coast super featherweight title
28	Win	25–3	Jesus Arce	KO	1 (12)	Aug 15, 1996	Centro de Espectáculos Rancho Grande, Mexicali, Mexico	Won vacant Mexican Pacific Coast super featherweight title
27	Loss	24–3	Javier Jáuregui	TKO	10 (12)	May 9, 1996	Guadalajara, Mexico	For Mexico featherweight title
26	Win	24–2	Carlos Madrid	KO	2 (10)	Mar 15, 1996	Palenque del Parque Vicente Guerrero, Mexicali, Mexico	
25	Win	23–2	Cornelio Lopez	KO	4 (10)	Dec 8, 1995	Estadio Estrellas Empalmenses, Empalme, Mexico	
24	Win	22–2	Alfredo Curiel	TKO	4 (10)	Sep 29, 1995	Centro de Espectáculos Aragon's, Mexicali, Mexico	
23	Win	21–2	Ramon Soto	KO	3 (10)	Apr 7, 1995	Auditorio del Estado, Mexicali, Mexico	
22	Loss	20–2	Javier Jáuregui	TKO	10 (12)	Nov 9, 1994	Mexico City, Mexico	For vacant Mexico featherweight title
21	Win	20–1	Alfredo Curiel	TKO	6	Aug 26, 1994	Empalme, Mexico	
20	Win	19–1	Francisco Valdez	KO	1 (10)	Mar 18, 1994	Palenque del Parque Vicente Guerrero, Mexicali, Mexico	
19	Loss	18–1	César Soto	TKO	2 (12)	Jul 9, 1993	Ciudad Juárez, Mexico	For vacant Mexico featherweight title
18	Win	18–0	Lucilo Nolasco	TKO	2 (10)	Apr 30, 1993	Auditorio del Estado, Mexicali, Mexico	
17	Win	17–0	Juan Carlos Salazar	TKO	1 (10)	Mar 5, 1993	Auditorio del Estado, Mexicali, Mexico	
16	Win	16–0	Ascencion Lugo	TKO	3 (10)	Dec 11, 1992	Centro de Usos Múltiples, Hermosillo, Mexico	
15	Win	15–0	Francisco Valdez	TD	6 (12)	Oct 2, 1992	Auditorio del Estado, Mexicali, Mexico	TD after Valdez was cut
14	Win	14–0	Jorge Castro	KO	2 (10)	Sep 4, 1992	Plaza La Cachanilla, Mexicali, Mexico	
13	Win	13–0	Rigoberto Felix	KO	3 (10)	Aug 7, 1992	Plaza La Cachanilla, Mexicali, Mexico	
12	Win	12–0	Ramon Acuna	KO	2	Jun 20, 1992	Empalme, Mexico	
11	Win	11–0	Ramon Arreola	KO	3 (10)	May 29, 1992	Plaza de Toros Calafia, Mexicali, Mexico	
10	Win	10–0	Cesar Huizar	KO	1	Mar 30, 1992	Tijuana, Mexico	
9	Win	9–0	Ramiro Dunton	KO	5	Nov 22, 1991	Auditorio del Estado, Mexicali, Mexico	
8	Win	8–0	Jose Manjarrez	TKO	7	Sep 6, 1991	Plaza de Toros Calafia, Mexicali, Mexico	
7	Win	7–0	Miguel Angel Ramirez	KO	4	Aug 19, 1991	Tijuana, Mexico	
6	Win	6–0	Victor Mendoza	KO	4	Apr 8, 1991	Tijuana, Mexico	
5	Win	5–0	Raul Contreras	TKO	4	Mar 21, 1991	Auditorio del Estado, Mexicali, Mexico	
4	Win	4–0	Jesus Escobar	KO	1 (6)	Dec 21, 1990	Gimnasio de la UABC, Mexicali, Mexico	
3	Win	3–0	Jose Alvarez	KO	2	Oct 1, 1990	Tijuana, Mexico	
2	Win	2–0	Manolo Ramirez	KO	2	Jun 23, 1990	Empalme, Mexico	
1	Win	1–0	Ricardo Contreras	KO	2 (4)	May 4, 1990	Auditorio del Estado, Mexicali, Mexico	

== See also ==
- List of WBC world champions
- List of Mexican boxing world champions

Sporting positions
Regional boxing titles
New title	Mexican Pacific Coast super featherweight champion August 16, 1996 – March 1997; Vacated	Vacant Title next held by Fernando Omar Lizarraga
Preceded by Rafael Olvera	Mexico featherweight champion July 4, 1997 – February 1998; Vacated	Vacant Title next held by Julio Sanchez Leon
Preceded by Julio Sanchez Leon	Mexico featherweight champion April 17, 1998 – October 1998; Vacated	Vacant Title next held by Hector Javier Marquez
Vacant Title last held by Julio Alvarez	Mexico super featherweight champion August 14, 1999 – April 2000; Vacated	Vacant Title next held by Gustavo Corral
Vacant Title last held by Herman Ngoudjo	NABF light welterweight champion January 20, 2007 – June 2007; Vacated	Vacant Title next held by Francisco Figueroa
Minor world boxing titles
Vacant Title last held by Junior Jones	IBA super featherweight champion October 15, 1999 – March 2000; Vacated	Vacant Title next held by Diego Corrales
Major world boxing titles
Preceded by Stevie Johnston	WBC lightweight champion June 17, 2000 – April 20, 2002	Succeeded by Floyd Mayweather Jr.
Vacant Title last held by Floyd Mayweather Jr.	WBC lightweight champion June 5, 2004 – May 7, 2005	Succeeded by Diego Corrales
Vacant Title last held by Floyd Mayweather Jr.	The Ring lightweight champion June 5, 2004 – May 7, 2005	Succeeded by Diego Corrales
Awards
Previous: Willy Wise; UD10 Julio César Chávez	The Ring Upset of the Year; MD12 Stevie Johnston; 2000	Next: Hasim Rahman; KO5 Lennox Lewis
