= Joel Díaz =

Mexican boxer (born 1973)

Personal information
- Born: February 18, 1973 (age 53) Jiquilpan, Michoacán, Mexico
- Height: 5 ft 8 in (173 cm)
- Weight: Light Welterweight; Lightweight; Super Featherweight

Boxing career
- Reach: 70 in (180 cm)
- Stance: Orthodox

Boxing record
- Total fights: 21
- Wins: 17
- Win by KO: 4
- Losses: 3
- Draws: 1
- No contests: 0

Joel Díaz (born February 18, 1973) is a Mexican-American former professional boxer. He is the brother of Antonio Díaz and former world champion Julio Díaz.

== Professional career ==
In August 1992, Díaz beat the former IBF Champion Julio César Borboa.

On October 19, 1996, Joel lost a twelve-round decision to undefeated IBF lightweight champion Philip Holiday in Wembley Indoor Arena, Johannesburg.

His last bout ever was a knockout win over the veteran José Luis Montes. This win made Díaz the number one rated contender and mandatory to then WBC lightweight champion, Stevie Johnston. Due to a detached retina that left him blind from one eye Díaz retired from boxing.

== Training career ==
Díaz has worked as a trainer for years. Some of the notable fighters who have trained under Díaz include, Antonio Díaz, Julio Díaz, Timothy Bradley, Abner Mares, Vicente Escobedo, Israil Madrimov, Shakhram Giyasov, Murodjon Akhmadaliev, Bektemir Melikuziev, Otabek Kholmatov, UFC fighter Cub Swanson and Ruslan Provodnikov.

=== Boxers trained ===
- Antonio Díaz, former International Boxing Association light welterweight and WBO Latino light middleweight champion
- Ruslan Provodnikov, former WBO light welterweight champion
- Julio Díaz, former IBF lightweight champion
- Timothy Bradley, former two-time WBC and WBO light welterweight and former WBO welterweight champion
- Israil Madrimov, former super welterweight WBA champion
- Abner Mares, former IBF bantamweight, former WBC super bantamweight former WBC featherweight champion.
- Vicente Escobedo, title contender and Olympic boxer for the U.S. in 2004
- Diego De La Hoya, an undefeated Mexican professional boxer in the featherweight division. De la Hoya represented Mexico in international tournaments and was one of the top rated Featherweights in his country, signed to Oscar De La Hoya's Golden Boy Promotions
- Omar Figueroa, an undefeated lightweight boxer signed to Golden Boy Promotions
- Jamie Kavanagh, Irish lightweight boxer signed to Golden Boy Promotions
- Lucas Matthysse
- Francisco Vargas

== See also ==
- Notable boxing families
