= Javier Jáuregui (boxer) =

Mexican boxer (1973–2013)

Personal information
- Nickname: El Chatito
- Born: Javier Rogelio Jáuregui Delgadillo; September 5, 1973 Guadalajara, Jalisco, Mexico
- Died: December 11, 2013 (aged 40) Guadalajara, Jalisco, Mexico
- Height: 5 ft 5 in (165 cm)
- Weight: Featherweight; Super featherweight; Lightweight; Light welterweight

Boxing career
- Reach: 71 in (180 cm)
- Stance: Orthodox

Boxing record
- Total fights: 73
- Wins: 54
- Win by KO: 37
- Losses: 17
- Draws: 2

Javier Rogelio Jáuregui Delgadillo (September 5, 1973 – December 11, 2013), also known as El Chatito, was a Mexican professional boxer in the lightweight (135 lb) division.

== Professional career ==
Jáuregui was born on 5 September 1973 (in Guadalajara, Jalisco) and turned pro in 1988 at the age of 14. After 15 years, in 2003, he captured the vacant IBF Lightweight Title with a TKO over Leavander Johnson. He lost the title in his first defense to Julio Díaz in 2004. He also handed future 2x lightweight world champion Jose Luis Castillo two TKO defeats.

== Professional boxing record ==
73 fights	54 wins	17 losses
By knockout	37	5
By decision	17	12
Draws	2	

No.	Result	Record	Opponent	Type	Round, time	Date	Location	Notes
73	Win	54–17–2	Fernando Ayala	TKO	3 (8)	2013-01-12	Ex-Hacienda de Caltengo, Tepeji, Mexico	
72	Loss	53–17–2	Ruslan Provodnikov	TKO	8 (10)	2010-02-12	Pechanga Resort & Casino, Temecula, California, U.S.	
71	Loss	53–16–2	Almazbek Raiymkulov	MD	10 (10)	2008-09-19	Buffalo Bill's Star Arena, Primm, Nevada, U.S.	
70	Loss	53–15–2	Anthony Peterson	UD	10 (10)	2008-08-02	Pearl Theater, Paradise, Nevada, U.S.	
69	Win	53–14–2	Miguel Angel Huerta	UD	12 (12)	2008-03-14	Cicero Stadium, Cicero, Illinois, U.S.	Won NABF lightweight title
68	Win	52–14–2	Adrian Mora	KO	8 (12)	2007-09-18	Table Mountain Casino, Friant, California, U.S.	Won IBA light-welterweight title
67	Loss	51–14–2	Jose Reyes	UD	8 (8)	2007-05-11	Coliseo Angel Espada, Salinas, Puerto Rico	
66	Loss	51–13–2	Joan Guzman	UD	10 (10)	2006-05-06	MGM Grand Garden Arena, Paradise, Nevada, U.S.	
65	Win	51–12–2	Jose Quintana	TKO	4 (10)	2005-12-16	Convention Center, Austin, Texas, U.S.	
64	Win	50–12–2	Randy Suico	MD	10 (10)	2005-09-23	Lyon Center, Los Angeles, California, U.S.	
63	Loss	49–12–2	Ricky Quiles	UD	12 (12)	2005-06-16	Seminole Casino, Coconut Creek, Florida, U.S.	
62	Win	49–11–2	Cristian Favela	UD	10 (10)	2005-02-04	UNF Arena, Jacksonville, Florida, U.S.	
61	Win	48–11–2	James Crayton	UD	10 (10)	2004-07-30	Centennial Garden Arena, Bakersfield, California, U.S.	
60	Loss	47–11–2	Julio Díaz	MD	12 (12)	2004-05-13	Sports Arena, San Diego, California, U.S.	Lost IBF lightweight title
59	Win	47–10–2	Leavander Johnson	TKO	11 (12)	2003-11-22	Olympic Auditorium, Los Angeles, California, U.S.	Won vacant IBF lightweight title
58	Win	46–10–2	Juan Gomez	KO	4 (12)	2003-06-19	Olympic Auditorium, Los Angeles, California, U.S.	
57	Win	45–10–2	Alex Trujillo	UD	12 (12)	2002-10-27	Mario Morales Coliseum, Guaynabo, Puerto Rico	
56	Win	44–10–2	Miguel Casillas	TKO	6 (10)	2002-05-17	Memorial Auditorium, Sacramento, California, U.S.	
55	Draw	43–10–2	Ryuhei Sugita	TD	5 (10)	2002-02-17	International Conference Hall, Nagoya, Japan	
54	Loss	43–10–1	Miguel Casillas	MD	12 (12)	2001-12-07	Miccosukee Resort & Gaming, Miami, Florida, U.S.	For vacant WBC FECARBOX super-featherweight title
53	Win	43–9–1	Ivan Valle	SD	10 (10)	2001-05-25	Discoteca El Alebrije, Acapulco, Mexico	
52	Win	42–9–1	Alex Camarillo	KO	2 (?)	2001-03-23	Guadalajara, Mexico	
51	Loss	41–9–1	Acelino Freitas	KO	1 (12)	2000-03-18	Credicard Hall, São Paulo, Brazil	For WBO Super-featherweight title
50	Win	41–8–1	Jose Badillo	SD	12 (12)	1999-02-08	Great Western Forum, Inglewood, California, U.S.	Forum super-featherweight tournament
49	Win	40–8–1	Ricardo Rivera	UD	10 (10)	1998-10-19	Great Western Forum, Inglewood, California, U.S.	
48	Win	39–8–1	Adan Casillas	UD	10 (10)	1998-07-27	Great Western Forum, Inglewood, California, U.S.	
47	Loss	38–8–1	Agapito Sanchez	UD	10 (10)	1998-02-21	Tropicana Hotel & Casino, Paradise, Nevada, U.S.	
46	Win	38–7–1	Javier Leon	KO	10 (12)	1997-10-24	Guadalajara, Mexico	Won WBC Continental Americas super-featherweight title
45	Loss	37–7–1	Rafael Olvera	KO	11 (12)	1997-04-25	Ciudad Juárez, Mexico	Lost Mexican featherweight title
44	Win	37–6–1	Alvaro Medel	PTS	12 (12)	1997-01-31	Ocotlán, Mexico	Retained Mexican featherweight title
43	Win	36–6–1	Julio Sanchez Leon	TKO	6 (12)	1996-11-08	Ocotlán, Mexico	Retained Mexican featherweight title
42	Loss	35–6–1	Jesus Chavez	UD	12 (12)	1996-08-09	Austin, Texas, U.S.	For vacant NABF featherweight title
41	Win	35–5–1	Jose Luis Castillo	TKO	10 (12)	1996-05-09	Guadalajara, Mexico	Retained Mexican featherweight title
40	Win	34–5–1	Benito Rodriguez	TKO	7 (12)	1996-03-01	Arena Coliseo, Guadalajara, Mexico	Retained Mexican featherweight title
39	Win	33–5–1	Ismael Lopez	TKO	5 (12)	1995-09-30	Mexico City, Mexico	Retained Mexican featherweight title
38	Win	32–5–1	Alvaro Medel	KO	2 (12)	1995-06-30	Guadalajara, Mexico	Retained Mexican featherweight title
37	Win	31–5–1	Raul Martinez Mora	TKO	8 (12)	1995-03-17	Guadalajara, Mexico	Retained Mexican featherweight title
36	Win	30–5–1	Jose Luis Castillo	TKO	10 (12)	1994-11-25	Mexico City, Mexico	Won vacant Mexican featherweight title
35	Win	29–5–1	Jose Luis Montes	TKO	3 (?)	1994-08-20	Mexico City, Mexico	
34	Win	28–5–1	Elias Quiroz	KO	7 (?)	1994-04-02	Mexico City, Mexico	
33	Win	27–5–1	Antonio Hernández	PTS	10 (10)	1993-12-17	Guadalajara, Mexico	
32	Win	26–5–1	Jose Rodriguez	TKO	7 (?)	1993-08-20	La Paz, Mexico	
31	Win	25–5–1	Rafael Ortega	TKO	3 (?)	1993-06-12	Mexico City, Mexico	
30	Win	24–5–1	Roberto Avila	PTS	10 (10)	1993-04-03	Mexico City, Mexico	
29	Win	23–5–1	Juan Valencia	TKO	2 (?)	1992-12-18	Guadalajara, Mexico	
28	Win	22–5–1	Gustavo Mendoza	KO	1 (?)	1992-11-27	Guadalajara, Mexico	
27	Win	21–5–1	Antonio Arias	TKO	1 (?)	1992-06-26	Guadalajara, Mexico	
26	Win	20–5–1	Jose Luis Montes	TKO	3 (?)	1992-05-15	Guadalajara, Mexico	
25	Loss	19–5–1	Jose de Jesus Garcia	TKO	1 (?)	1991-12-14	Mexico	
24	Loss	19–4–1	Jose Garcia	PTS	10 (10)	1991-10-04	Chetumal, Mexico	
23	Loss	19–3–1	Martin Perez	PTS	10 (10)	1991-05-11	Mexico City, Mexico	
22	Loss	19–2–1	Otilio Gallegos	PTS	10 (10)	1991-03-09	Mexico City, Mexico	
21	Win	19–1–1	Tomas Valdez	TKO	3 (?)	1991-02-09	Arena Coliseo, Mexico City, Mexico	
20	Win	18–1–1	Carlos Monroy	TKO	4 (10)	1990-12-15	Guadalajara, Mexico	
19	Win	17–1–1	Otilio Gallegos	PTS	10 (10)	1990-10-20	Guadalajara, Mexico	
18	Loss	16–1–1	Raul Martinez Mora	TKO	9 (?)	1990-08-10	Guadalajara, Mexico	
17	Draw	16–0–1	Miguel Juarez	PTS	10 (10)	1990-06-29	Guadalajara, Mexico	
16	Win	16–0	Jose Davila	KO	3 (?)	1990-03-30	Guadalajara, Mexico	
15	Win	15–0	Alfonso Salinas	TKO	2 (?)	1990-02-23	Guadalajara, Mexico	
14	Win	14–0	Gustavo Dominguez	TKO	3 (?)	1989-11-03	Guadalajara, Mexico	
13	Win	13–0	Benjamin Aragon	TKO	4 (?)	1989-09-29	Guadalajara, Mexico	
12	Win	12–0	Alvaro Medel	TKO	5 (?)	1989-08-25	Guadalajara, Mexico	
11	Win	11–0	David Navarro	TKO	3 (?)	1989-07-07	Minatitlán, Mexico	
10	Win	10–0	Rafael Valdovinos	TKO	4 (?)	1989-06-03	Guadalajara, Mexico	
9	Win	9–0	Juan Arias	TKO	3 (?)	1989-04-21	Guadalajara, Mexico	
8	Win	8–0	Rodolfo Peralta	KO	5 (?)	1989-02-16	Guadalajara, Mexico	
7	Win	7–0	Ricardo Padilla	KO	1 (?)	1988-12-01	Guadalajara, Mexico	
6	Win	6–0	Antonio Martinez	KO	2 (?)	1988-11-11	Guadalajara, Mexico	
5	Win	5–0	Antonio Martinez	TKO	5 (?)	1988-08-26	Guadalajara, Mexico	
4	Win	4–0	Leoncio Rodriguez	PTS	6 (6)	1988-07-15	Guadalajara, Mexico	
3	Win	3–0	Antonio Martinez	PTS	4 (4)	1988-06-10	Guadalajara, Mexico	
2	Win	2–0	Carlos Navarro	PTS	4 (4)	1988-04-22	Guadalajara, Mexico	
1	Win	1–0	Alejandro Ochoa	PTS	4 (4)	1988-02-26	Guadalajara, Mexico	

== Death ==
It was reported on December 11, 2013, that Jauregui had suffered a stroke in Jalisco, Mexico, and been declared braindead. He died later that day, after a short period in a coma. Some speculated that his stroke could have been caused by a hard sparring session with Canelo Alvarez a day prior.

== See also ==
- List of Mexican boxing world champions
- List of world lightweight boxing champions

Sporting positions
Regional boxing titles
Vacant Title last held by César Soto	Mexican featherweight champion November 25, 1994 – April 25, 1997	Succeeded by Rafael Olvera
Vacant Title last held by Jorge Páez	WBC Continental Americas super-featherweight champion October 24, 1997 – 1998; Vacated	Vacant Title next held by Carlos Gerena
Vacant Title last held by Miguel Callist	WBA Fedelatin lightweight champion October 27, 2002 – 2003; Vacated	Vacant Title next held by Juan Gómez
Preceded by Miguel Ángel Huerta	NABF lightweight champion March 14, 2008 – 2009; Vacated	Vacant Title next held by Jason Litzau
Minor World boxing titles
Preceded by Adrian Mora	IBA light-welterweight champion September 18, 2007 – 2008; Vacated	Vacant Title next held by Silverio Ortiz
Major World boxing titles
Vacant Title last held by Paul Spadafora	IBF lightweight champion November 22, 2003 – May 13, 2004	Succeeded by Julio Díaz
