= Adrian Mora =

American boxer

Adrián Mora
Personal information
- Nickname: Juanito
- Born: Adrián Mora; September 2, 1978 (age 48) Thornton, Colorado
- Height: 6 ft 0 in (183 cm)
- Weight: Welterweight

Boxing career
- Reach: 78 in (198 cm)
- Stance: Orthodox

Boxing record
- Total fights: 22
- Wins: 20
- Win by KO: 12
- Losses: 1
- Draws: 1
- No contests: 0

Adrián Mora (born February 26, 1978) is an American former professional boxer who competed from 2000 to 2008. He held the IBA light welterweight title in 2007.

== Amateur career ==
Mora had an amateur career of 62-8 and won a silver medal at the 2000 Western trials. He is the younger brother of both light welterweight contender Anthony Mora and boxing referee Russell Mora.

== Professional career ==
In January 2007, Mora beat the American Aaron Drake to win the National Boxing Association light welterweight title.

In May 2007, Mora beat Marc Thompson (15-1) in just the first round to win the IBA light welterweight title. This bout was held at the Broomfield Event Center in Broomfield, Colorado.

His only loss was to IBF champion Javier Jáuregui in September 2007. One year later Mora knocked out the veteran Shad Howard.
