= Floyd Mayweather Jr. vs. Diego Corrales =

Boxing match

Raging Rivals
- Date: January 20, 2001
- Venue: MGM Grand Garden Arena, Paradise, Nevada, U.S.
- Title on the line: WBC super featherweight title

Tale of the tape
Boxer	Floyd Mayweather Jr.	Diego Corrales
Nickname	Pretty Boy	Chico
Hometown	Grand Rapids, Michigan, U.S.	Sacramento, California, U.S.
Purse	$1,700,000	$1,400,000
Pre-fight record	24–0 (18 KO)	33–0 (27 KO)
Age	23 years, 10 months	23 years, 4 months
Height	5 ft 8 in (173 cm)	5 ft 10 1/2 in (179 cm)
Weight	130 lb (59 kg)	130 lb (59 kg)
Style	Orthodox	Orthodox
Recognition	WBC; Super Featherweight Champion; The Ring; No. 7 ranked pound-for-pound fighter	IBF; No. 3 Ranked Lightweight; WBC; No. 7 Ranked Lightweight; The Ring; No. 5 ranked pound-for-pound fighter Former super featherweight champion

Result
- Mayweather wins via 10th-round TKO

Floyd Mayweather Jr. vs. Diego Corrales, billed as Raging Rivals, was a professional boxing match contested on January 20, 2001, for the WBC super featherweight title.

== Background ==
A fight between WBC super featherweight champion Floyd Mayweather Jr. and IBF super featherweight champion Diego Corrales had been in the works since March 2000 when the two fighters co-headlined a boxing card in which both successfully defended their titles against Gregorio Vargas and Derrick Gainer respectively. After months of negotiations, promoter Bob Arum finally announced on December 1, 2000, that he had signed the two undefeated fighters to compete the following month on January 20, 2001. By the time of his fight with Mayweather, Corrales no longer held the IBF super featherweight title. Corrales has previously expressed his intentions to move up to the 135-pound lightweight division, leading to his managers Cameron Dunkin and Barrett Silver notifying the IBF that he would be relinquishing the title. Corrales, however, claimed that Dunkin and Silver had relinquished the title without his consent, causing a rift between the two parties, which then resulted in Corrales dismissing both men as his managers. Dunkin and Silver would file an injunction after the fight after Corrales attempted to cut them out of the percentage of his purse they claimed they were owed.

In the summer before the fight, Corrales had been arrested and charged for domestic abuse against his then-pregnant wife Maria and was expected to be formally sentenced for the alleged crime after his fight with Mayweather. Mayweather would taunt Corrales about his misfortunes vowing that he would defeat Corrales on behalf of "every battered woman out there." When Corrales was made aware of the insult he promised to "pound and hurt" Mayweather and had posters of Mayweather affixed to punch bags with the words "kill Floyd" on the bottom. Though Corrales was two spots ahead of Mayweather on The Ring magazine's pound-for-pound rankings, Mayweather nevertheless entered the fight as a 7-5 favorite.

== Fight details ==
In what would be arguably the best performance of his professional career, Mayweather completely dominated Corrales through 10 rounds. Throwing 414 punches, Mayweather landed over half of them, scoring 220 punches while stifling Corrales defensively, who landed a paltry 60 punches out of the 205 he threw. Mayweather nearly ended the fight after a particularly dominating seventh round. Mayweather would score three knockdowns over Corrales in the round, first dropping him in the opening seconds with a short left. Corrales answered referee Richard Steele's 10-count and continued on, pressing forward, but continued to struggle offensively as Mayweather peppered him with quick punches almost at will before landing a left uppercut with around 40 seconds remaining that send Corrales down for the second time. Again, Corrales answered the 10-count and was allowed to continue, but Mayweather relentlessly attacked the exhausted Corrales and quickly sent him down for the third time with a furious combination. Corrales once again got back up and was saved from further punishment as the round then ended. Mayweather continued his dominance through the next two rounds before once again sending Corrales down for the fourth time midway through the 10th round after landing another left. For the fourth time Corrales answered the 10-count and continued the fight, but a Mayweather right sent him down for the fifth time shortly thereafter. Corrales would once again arise, but his stepfather and trainer Ray Woods, having seen enough, stepped onto the ring apron signifying that he wanted the fight stopped, causing Steele to call the fight and award Mayweather the victory by technical knockout. A furious Corrales protested the decision and had to be restrained by Steele after shoving and arguing with Woods for stopping the fight.

== Aftermath ==
In the officials' post fight meeting, referee Richard Steele unexpectedly announced his retirement. He would return to refereeing in September 2004.

== Fight card ==
Confirmed bouts:

Weight Class	Weight		vs.		Method	Round	Notes
Super Featherweight	130 lbs.	Floyd Mayweather Jr. (c)	def.	Diego Corrales	TKO	10/12	^{note 1}
Lightweight	135 lbs.	José Luis Castillo	def.	César Bazán	TKO	6/12	^{note 2}
Super Featherweight	130 lbs.	Mia St. John	def.	Sherri Thompson	TKO	3/4x2
Heavyweight	200+ lbs.	José Celaya	def.	Mauricio Rodriguez	MD	4/4
Super Bantamweight	122 lbs.	Ernest Johnson	def.	Jamal Hodges	TKO	2/4
Super Bantamweight	122 lbs.	Gerald Tucker	def.	Antonio Jose Ruiz	UD	4/4

^Note 1 For WBC Super Featherweight Title
^Note 2 For WBC Lightweight Title

== Broadcasting ==
Country	Broadcaster
United States	HBO

Preceded by vs. Emanuel Augustus	Floyd Mayweather Jr.'s bouts 20 January 2001	Succeeded by vs. Carlos Hernández
Preceded by vs. Angel Manfredy	Diego Corrales's bouts 20 January 2001	Succeeded by vs. Michael Davis
