= Michael Oliveira =

Brazilian boxer (born 1990)

Personal information
- Nickname: The Brazilian Rocky
- Born: Michael Oliveira; April 26, 1990 (age 36) São Paulo, São Paulo, Brazil
- Height: 5 ft 10 in (1.78 m)
- Weight: Super middleweight Middleweight; Light middleweight

Boxing career
- Reach: 71 in (180 cm)
- Stance: Orthodox

Boxing record
- Total fights: 23
- Wins: 21
- Win by KO: 16
- Losses: 2
- Draws: 0
- No contests: 0

Michael Oliveira (born April 26, 1990) is a Brazilian professional boxer.

== Professional career ==
On September 11, 2009 Oliveira beat Robert Kliewer to win the UNBC Latin middleweight title.

On June 2, 2012 Oliveria lost a fight to former multiple world champion Acelino Freitas.

== End of career ==
Michael Oliveira was a welcome revelation from Brazilian boxing. Despite the defeat for Acelino "Popó" Freitas, it was seen as the future of Brazil. But on his way Norberto Gonzalez appeared. In 2013, in a duel of 10 rounds, the Brazilian not only knew his second defeat. When losing in the unanimous decision, the "Brazilian Rocky" felt bad and with a clot in the brain spent a few days hospitalized. The episode ended his career.

== Professional boxing record ==
21 Wins (16 knockout, 5 decisions), 2 Losses, 0 Draws
Res.	Record	Opponent	Type	Round	Date	Location	Notes
Loss	21–2	(Mexico) Norberto Gonzalez	UD	10 (10)	2013-11-12	(United States) Seminole Hard Rock Hotel and Casino, Hollywood, Florida	
Win	21–1	(Colombia) Francisco Cordero	RTD	2 (9)	2013-05-10	(Dominican Republic) Coliseo Carlos 'Teo' Cruz, Santo Domingo	
Win	20–1	(Colombia) Orlando de Jesus Estrada	TKO	2 (9)	2013-03-09	(Dominican Republic) Coliseo Carlos 'Teo' Cruz, Santo Domingo	
Win	19–1	(Dominican Republic) David Toribio	RTD	4 (10)	2012-12-15	(Dominican Republic) Coliseo Pedro Julio Nolasco, La Romana	
Win	18–1	(Dominican Republic) Alexander Hernandez	KO	2 (10)	2012-11-25	(Dominican Republic) Gimnasio Pedro Cruz, Santiago de los Caballeros	
Loss	17–1	(Brazil) Acelino Freitas	TKO	9 (10)	2012-06-02	(Uruguay) Hotel & Casino Conrad, Punta del Este	
Win	17–0	(Estonia) Sergei Melis	UD	8 (8)	2012-02-11	(Canada) Hershey Centre, Mississauga, Ontario	
Win	16–0	(United States) Xavier Toliver	DQ	8 (8)	2011-11-11	(United States) Cohen Stadium, El Paso, Texas	
Win	15–0	(Dominican Republic) Jose Vidal Soto	KO	6 (10)	2011-07-16	(Brazil) Credicard Hall, São Paulo, São Paulo	
Win	14–0	(Argentina) Abel Nicolas Adriel	UD	10 (10)	2011-03-25	(Brazil) Ginasio Municipal Ibirapuera, São Paulo, São Paulo	
Win	13–0	(Dominican Republic) Junior Ramos	TKO	3 (10)	2010-11-20	(Brazil) Espaço das Americas, São Paulo, São Paulo	
Win	12–0	(United States) Jessie Davis	TKO	4 (6)	2010-04-30	(United States) Miccosukee Indian Gaming Resort, Miami, Florida	
Win	11–0	(Dominican Republic) Eduardo Mercedes	TKO	2 (8)	2009-12-18	(Haiti) Karibe Convention Center, Pétion-Ville	
Win	10–0	(Dominican Republic) Gustavo de la Cruz	TKO	1 (6)	2009-12-07	(Dominican Republic) Bruno Car Wash, Santo Domingo	
Win	9–0	(Colombia) Francisco Ruben Osorio	RTD	7 (8)	2009-11-07	(United States) XL Center, Hartford, Connecticut	
Win	8–0	(United States) Robert Kliewer	UD	8 (8)	2009-09-11	(United States) Club Cinema, Pompano Beach, Florida	
Win	7–0	(United States) Joe Howard	TKO	1 (4)	2009-05-16	(United States) Farm Bureau Building, Indianapolis, Indiana	
Win	6–0	(United States) Guy Packer	TKO	2 (4)	2009-04-24	(United States) Orbit Room, Grand Rapids, Michigan	
Win	5–0	(United States) Vladimir Laguna	MD	4 (4)	2009-03-20	(United States) Doubletree Miamimart Hotel, Miami, Florida	
Win	4–0	(United States) Michael Bradley	KO	1 (4)	2009-03-03	(United States) Pepsi Coliseum, Indianapolis, Indiana	
Win	3–0	(United States) David Deangelo Foster	TKO	1 (4)	2008-11-25	(United States) Pepsi Coliseum, Indianapolis, Indiana	
Win	2–0	(United States) Carlos Harris	TKO	1 (4)	2008-11-01	(United States) West Junior High School, West Memphis, Arkansas	
Win	1–0	(United States) Kevin Bartlett	TKO	1 (4)	2008-08-21	(United States) Omar Shrine Temple, Mount Pleasant, South Carolina	
