= Antonio Díaz (boxer) =

Mexican boxer (born 1976)

Personal information
- Nickname: Toño
- Born: José Antonio Díaz; June 13, 1976 (age 50) Jiquilpan, Michoacán, Mexico
- Height: 5 ft 10 in (180 cm)
- Weight: Light welterweight Welterweight; Light middleweight

Boxing career
- Reach: 72 in (184 cm)
- Stance: Orthodox

Boxing record
- Total fights: 54
- Wins: 47
- Win by KO: 30
- Losses: 6
- Draws: 1

José Antonio Díaz (born June 13, 1976) is a Mexican boxing trainer and former boxer. He's the former International Boxing Association light welterweight and WBO Latino light middleweight champion. Antonio is the brother of boxing trainer Joel Díaz and former IBF lightweight champion Julio Díaz.

== Professional career ==
Among his 11 title defenses, Díaz holds wins over champions like Cory Spinks, Ivan Robinson, Micky Ward, Ahmed Santos, and Omar Gabriel Weis. His only losses have been to Juan Lazcano, Victor Ortiz, Shane Mosley and Antonio Margarito.

== See also ==
- List of boxing families
