= Cameron Dunkin =

American boxing manager (1956–2024)

- Born: 1956
- Died: January 2, 2024 (aged 67–68); Las Vegas, Nevada

Cameron Dunkin (1956 – January 2, 2024) was an American boxing manager. During a career that spanned over 30 years, he managed the careers of such notables as Diego Corrales, Terence Crawford, Johnny Tapia, Kelly Pavlik, Timothy Bradley, and Mikey Garcia.

During his career, he managed more than 30 world champion professional boxers. He was named the 2007 Boxing Manager of the Year by the Boxing Writers Association of America.

Dunkin died of pancreatic cancer in Las Vegas, Nevada, on January 2, 2024, at the age of 67.
