= Daniel Alicea =

Puerto Rican boxer (1973–2023)

Personal information
- Nickname: Pipino
- Born: 1973 Santurce, Puerto Rico
- Died: September 8, 2023 (aged 50) Camden, New Jersey, U.S.
- Weight: Featherweight; Super featherweight

Boxing career

Boxing record
- Total fights: 39
- Wins: 30
- Win by KO: 22
- Losses: 7
- Draws: 2

Daniel Alicea (1973 – September 8, 2023) was a Puerto Rican professional boxer. He was a featherweight and a junior lightweight.

On June 8, 1996, Alicea challenged Naseem Hamed for the World Boxing Organization's world Featherweight championship at the Telewest Arena in Newcastle, England. The contest was televised in the United States on the Showtime Network. Alicea almost caused an upset when he dropped Hamed in round one but was stopped in round two. Alicea also fought Acelino Freitas, being knocked out in the first round by the Brazilian.

Alicea later won the North American Boxing Organization, the World Boxing Council Continental Americas, and the North American Boxing Federation Junior Lightweight titles.

Alicea retired from boxing with a record of 30 wins, 7 losses and 2 draws (ties) in 39 contests, 22 wins and 6 losses coming by knockout.

== Personal life and death ==
Alicea was married to Frances Pagan. He resided in Camden, New Jersey. Alicea was a Christian, as is his widow.

In 2016, Alicea was diagnosed with leukemia. The cancer at first receded, but it returned in 2019. He died from a brain bleed on September 8, 2023, at the age of 50.

== See also ==
- List of Puerto Ricans
