= Ruslan Provodnikov =

Russian boxer (born 1984)

Ruslan Provodnikov Руслан Проводников
Personal information
- Nickname: The Siberian Rocky
- Nationality: Russian
- Born: 20 January 1984 (age 42) Beryozovo, Soviet Union
- Height: 1.68 m (5 ft 6 in)
- Weight: Light welterweight; Welterweight

Boxing career
- Reach: 168 cm (66 in)
- Stance: Orthodox

Boxing record
- Total fights: 30
- Wins: 25
- Win by KO: 18
- Losses: 5

Ruslan Mikhailovich Provodnikov (Russian: Руслан Михайлович Проводников; born 20 January 1984) is a former Russian professional boxer and politician. In boxing he competed from 2006 to 2016, and held the WBO junior welterweight world title from 2013 to 2014. He challenged once for the WBO welterweight world title in 2013 against Timothy Bradley, in a fight that was named Fight of the Year by The Ring magazine and the Boxing Writers Association of America.

During the prime of his career, Provodnikov was known as an aggressive pressure fighter possessing formidable punching power, stamina and an durable chin. His opponents Chris Algieri and Hall of Fame champion Timothy Bradley both stated that Provodnikov was the strongest fighter they ever faced, with a harder punch than even Manny Pacquiao.

== Personal life ==
Provodnikov said that he wanted to learn English. Provodnikov was translated to have said, "I think boxing saved my life", as part of a translation of a statement Provodnikov made in response to an interviewer's question about what career he would have chosen if he was not a boxer.

=== Early life ===
Ruslan Mikhailovich Provodnikov was born in Beryozovo, a small village in Khanty-Mansi Autonomous Okrug to an ethnic Russian father and an ethnic Mansi mother, but identifies himself as Mansi. Provodnikov said that he used to street-fight as a child, so his dad took him to a boxing trainer when he was ten years old to box. He would regularly make a 1-day trip to train at a gym that was something closer to what a professional boxing gym should be. As an amateur he won 130 of 150 fights. He was discovered in Ekaterinburg by his current promoters and managers, who brought him to the U.S.

He is Russian Orthodox Christian.

=== Other sports ===
Provodnikov said that he enjoyed playing football and basketball.

=== Life for his son ===
Provodnikov said he wanted to provide for his son and give his son options in life. He said he was having his son grow up in the same place where he did, and that he wanted his son to experience the way he lived. He said he wanted his son to play sports and watch less TV and use the internet less.

=== Eating meat ===
Provodnikov said that he enjoyed eating raw meat such as raw moose liver and raw fish, and he said that he believed that eating meat made him strong.

== Professional career ==
=== Early career ===
Provodnikov fought several times on ESPN 2's Friday Night Fights and developed a reputation for being an exciting, come forward, pressure fighter. He scored a decision win over Demarcus Corley and lost a controversial decision to Mauricio Herrera.

=== Provodnikov vs. Bradley ===
Provodnikov lost a close unanimous decision to Timothy Bradley on March 16, 2013, for the WBO welterweight championship. Provodnikov was considered an easily beatable opponent for Bradley, who was looking for a confidence booster after beating Manny Pacquiao in what was deemed one of boxing's worst decisions. Bradley came out on the attack early, fighting in an uncharacteristically aggressive fashion. Provodnikov made him pay, however, tagging him with hard shots in the first round, and staggering him in the second. Bradley said after the fight that he was concussed by a shot Provodnikov hit him with in the second round. Bradley boxed more conservatively as the fight wore on, winning most of the middle rounds. In the last round, Provodnikov badly hurt Bradley again but Bradley took a knee with just seconds remaining, beating the count and hanging on to win the fight on points. Bradley was impressed by Provodnikov's power and will, saying "he's going to be a world champion someday". The fight was named "2013 Fight of the Year" by Ring Magazine and the Boxing Writers Association of America.

CompuBox Stats (General)

Boxer	Round	1	2	3	4	5	6	7	8	9	10	11	12	Total
Bradley	Landed / Thrown	27/74	28/80	21/56	48/107	47/118	38/103	18/73	33/71	39/92	12/65	26/101	10/60	347/1000
	Percent	36%	35%	38%	45%	40%	37%	25%	46%	42%	18%	26%	17%	35%
Provodnikov	Landed / Thrown	24/69	38/97	2/15	12/37	19/54	34/84	15/36	6/26	16/56	13/42	24/95	15/65	218/676
	Percent	35%	39%	13%	32%	35%	40%	42%	23%	29%	31%	25%	23%	32%

=== Provodnikov vs. Alvarado ===
Moving back down to junior welterweight to fight Mike Alvarado for the WBO Junior welterweight belt. Provodnikov defeated Mike Alvarado by 10th-round stoppage on October 19, 2013, at the FirstBank Center in Denver, Colorado. Provodnikov was ahead on all three scorecards and had knocked Alvarado down twice in the eighth round. Alvarado then elected to not come out for the eleventh round.

=== Provodnikov vs. Algieri ===
Provodnikov faced little-known American Chris Algieri in the first defense of his title on June 14, 2014, at the Barclays Center in Brooklyn, New York. Provodnikov connected with a left hook in the first round that knocked Algieri down and formed a large swelling under the challenger's right eye. Despite scoring two knockdowns in the opening frame, Algieri's footwork and boxing skills prevented Provodnikov from getting into range to land his shots. Provodnikov would go on to lose a controversial split decision.

=== Provodnikov vs. Matthysse ===
After dispatching of veteran Jose Luis Castillo in five rounds, in his home country. Negotiations began for a bout with fellow power puncher, Argentine Lucas Matthysse, there was a large amount of hype surrounding the fight coming in. It took place at the Turning Stone Resort & Casino, Verona, New York on the 18th of April, and lived up to the hype as the two fighters went toe to toe from the opening bell in a fight of the year candidate. A headbutt caused a deep cut above Ruslan's left eye early in the fight and it began to distract him straight away. Matthysse utilized his jab and superior boxing skills for most of the bout. Ruslan once again proved to have a granite chin as he took the hardest shots of Matthysse, who is considered to be the hardest puncher in the division and pound for pound one of the hardest punchers in the world. After being outboxed the first few rounds, Ruslan came back in the latter half of the bout, and began to break down Matthysse, hurting him severely in the 11th round but failed to capitalize, or achieve enough early on and went on to lose a Majority decision. Matthysse broke his right hand in the fight. His urine sample, discoloured black due to rhabdomyelosis, was visible in a picture posted to his Instagram after the fight.

==== Provodnikov vs. Rodriguez ====
On 7 November 2015, Provodnikov faced Jesus Alvarez Rodriguez. The former champ knocked out the previously unbeaten Rodriguez in round four.

==== Provodnikov vs Molina Jr ====
On 11 June 2016, Provodnikov faced John Molina Jr. Provodnikov lost in his Showtime debut via unanimous decision, with all three judges scoring the fight in favor of Molina Jr, 112–116, 113-115 and 111–117.

== Professional boxing record ==
30 fights	25 wins	5 losses
By knockout	18	0
By decision	7	5

No.	Result	Record	Opponent	Type	Round, time	Date	Location	Notes
30	Loss	25–5	John Molina Jr.	UD	12	11 Jun 2016	Turning Stone Resort Casino, Verona, New York, US	
29	Win	25–4	Jesus Alvarez Rodriguez	TKO	4 (10), 1:40	7 Nov 2015	Salle des Etoiles, Monte Carlo, Monaco	
28	Loss	24–4	Lucas Matthysse	MD	12	18 Apr 2015	Turning Stone Resort Casino, Verona, New York, US	
27	Win	24–3	José Luis Castillo	TKO	5 (12), 0:50	28 Nov 2014	Luzhniki Stadium, Moscow, Russia	
26	Loss	23–3	Chris Algieri	SD	12	14 Jun 2014	Barclays Center, New York City, New York, US	Lost WBO light welterweight title
25	Win	23–2	Mike Alvarado	RTD	10 (12), 3:00	19 Oct 2013	1stBank Center, Broomfield, Colorado, US	Won WBO light welterweight title
24	Loss	22–2	Timothy Bradley	UD	12	16 Mar 2013	Home Depot Center, Carson, California, US	For WBO welterweight title
23	Win	22–1	Jose Reynoso	KO	2 (10), 1:52	29 Jun 2012	Omega Products International, Corona, California, US	Retained WBO Inter-Continental light welterweight title
22	Win	21–1	David Torres	TKO	6 (10), 2:53	27 Jan 2012	Northern Quest Resort & Casino, Airway Heights, Washington, US	Won vacant WBO Inter-Continental light welterweight title
21	Win	20–1	DeMarcus Corley	UD	12	5 Dec 2011	Palace of Sporting Games, Yekaterinburg, Russia	Won vacant WBC–ABCO light welterweight title
20	Win	19–1	Iván Popoca	KO	8 (10), 2:16	15 Apr 2011	Pechanga Resort & Casino, Temecula, California, US	
19	Win	18–1	Vyacheslav Yakovenko	TKO	3 (6), 2:43	20 Feb 2011	Viktoria, Berezovo, Russia	
18	Loss	17–1	Mauricio Herrera	UD	12	7 Jan 2011	Cox Pavilion, Paradise, Nevada, US	For vacant IBF North American light welterweight title
17	Win	17–0	Fayzullo Ahmedov	UD	6	16 Oct 2010	Trading-Entertaining Center "Alatyr", Yekaterinburg, Russia	
16	Win	16–0	Emanuel Augustus	TKO	9 (10), 1:50	21 May 2010	Energy Arena, Laredo, Texas, US	
15	Win	15–0	Javier Jáuregui	TKO	8 (10), 2:10	21 Feb 2010	Pechanga Resort & Casino, Temecula, California, US	
14	Win	14–0	Victor Hugo Castro	KO	2 (12), 0:30	28 Nov 2009	Sport CSK VSS, Samara, Russia	Won vacant WBO Inter-Continental light welterweight title
13	Win	13–0	Mahsud Jumaev	RTD	2 (6), 3:00	24 Oct 2009	Sverdlovsk Film Studio, Yekaterinburg, Russia	
12	Win	12–0	Esteban Almaraz	UD	6	20 Mar 2009	Entertainment Center, Laredo, Texas, US	
11	Win	11–0	Abdulaziz Matazimov	UD	6	21 Feb 2009	Tennis Centre, Khanty-Mansiysk, Russia	
10	Win	10–0	Sergey Starkov	UD	10	3 Nov 2008	Berezovo, Russia	
9	Win	9–0	Wang Jie	TKO	3 (8)	22 Aug 2008	Olympic Village, Beijing, China	
8	Win	8–0	Brian Gordon	UD	6	16 May 2008	Thomas & Mack Center, Paradise, Nevada, US	
7	Win	7–0	Jose Angel Roman	TKO	1 (6), 2:28	7 Mar 2008	Foxwoods Resort Casino, Ledyard, Connecticut, US	
6	Win	6–0	Vadim Sufiyanov	KO	3 (6), 1:07	31 Jan 2008	Casino Vodoley, Yekaterinburg, Russia	
5	Win	5–0	Darren Darby	TKO	1 (4), 2:12	16 Sep 2007	Northern Quest Resort & Casino, Airway Heights, Washington, US	
4	Win	4–0	Willie Diamond	TKO	1 (4), 1:46	23 Jun 2007	Thomas & Mack Center, Paradise, Nevada, US	
3	Win	3–0	Antwon Barrett	KO	1 (4), 2:33	28 Apr 2007	Foxwoods Resort Casino, Ledyard, Connecticut, US	
2	Win	2–0	Dmitry Toropchin	RTD	2 (4), 3:00	1 Feb 2007	Casino Vodoley, Yekaterinburg, Russia	
1	Win	1–0	Kirill Artemiev	UD	4	3 Dec 2006	Palace of Sporting Games, Yekaterinburg, Russia	

Sporting positions
Regional boxing titles
Vacant Title last held by Willy Blain	WBO Inter-Continental light welterweight champion 28 November 2009 – February 2010; Vacated	Vacant Title next held by Lucas Matthysse
Vacant Title last held by Khabib Allakhverdiev	WBC–ABCO light welterweight champion 5 December 2011 – January 2012; Vacated	Vacant Title next held by Ekapol Singwancha
Vacant Title last held by Danny García	WBO Inter-Continental light welterweight champion 27 January 2012 – 16 March 2013; Lost bid for world title	Vacant Title next held by Bradley Saunders
World boxing titles
Preceded by Mike Alvarado	WBO light welterweight champion 19 October 2013 – 14 June 2014	Succeeded by Chris Algieri
Awards
Previous: Juan Manuel Márquez vs. Manny Pacquiao IV	The Ring Fight of the Year vs. Timothy Bradley; 2013	Next: Lucas Matthysse vs. John Molina Jr.
Previous: Juan Manuel Márquez vs. Manny Pacquiao IV	BWAA Fight of the Year vs. Timothy Bradley; 2013	Next: Lucas Matthysse vs. John Molina Jr.
Previous: Manny Pacquiao vs. Juan Manuel Márquez IV; Round 5	The Ring Round of the Year vs. Timothy Bradley; Round 6; 2013	Next: Tommy Coyle vs. Daniel Brizuela; Round 11
