= Somsak Sithchatchawal =

Thai boxer

Personal information
- Nickname: Diamond Heart Boxer
- Nationality: Thai
- Born: July 17, 1977 (age 48) Mae Mo, Lampang, Thailand
- Height: 5 ft 7 in (170 cm)
- Weight: Super-flyweight; Super-bantamweight; Super-featherweight

Boxing career
- Stance: Orthodox

Boxing record
- Total fights: 68
- Wins: 60
- Win by KO: 43
- Losses: 4
- Draws: 3
- No contests: 1

Somsak Sithchatchawal (Thai: สมศักดิ์ ศิษย์ชัชวาลย์; born July 17, 1977) is a Thai former professional boxer who competed from 1995 to 2010. He held the WBA super-bantamweight title in 2006.

In March 2006, Sithchatchawal took part in what later won Ring Magazine fight of the year when he challenged WBA Super Bantamweight champion Mahyar Monshipour. Sithchatchawal dropped Monshipour in the first round, and won via TKO in the 10th round to capture the belt. Sithchatchawal lost his WBA world super-bantamweight belt to Celestino Caballero in Sithchatchawal's native country of Thailand on October 4, 2006. Caballero won by TKO by knocking Sithchatchawal down three times in the third round—causing the referee to cease the bout.

His record is 46-2-1-1 (37 KOs). He is a former WBA world super bantamweight champion.

The September 15, 2008, split decision 8th round win of Filipino Joel De La Cruz over Somsak Sithchatchawal, at the Cebu Coliseum, was officially amended to a draw due to apparent error in scorecards tally. Cebu Games and Amusements Board explained that "there was no problem on the scorecards of 3 judges -- Edward Ligas and Salven Lagumbay of the Philippines and Saween Taweekon of Thailand -- after 7 rounds. But, at the end of round 8, Mendoza admitted he thought the 10-9 score in favor of de La Cruz was by Lagumbay and not from the Thai judge. The GAB made the correction and instead of a win, de La Cruz had to settle for a draw. Mendoza said the scorecards read Ligas, 77-74, in favor of de La Cruz, Lagumbay, 76-75, in favor of Somsak while the Thai judge scored it 76-76."

== Professional boxing record ==
68 fights	60 wins	4 losses
By knockout	43	3
By decision	17	1
Draws	3	
No contests	1	

No.	Result	Record	Opponent	Type	Round, time	Date	Location	Notes
68	Loss	60–4–3 (1)	Fernando Otic	TKO	4 (6)	6 Jan 2010	Koh Tao, Surat Thani, Thailand	
67	Draw	60–3–3 (1)	Dante Paulino	SD	11	9 Oct 2009	Taksin University, Songkhla, Thailand	
66	Win	60–3–2 (1)	Hendrik Barongsay	UD	6	25 Aug 2009	Central Stadium, Loei, Thailand	
65	Win	59–3–2 (1)	Eddy Comaro	UD	11	12 Jun 2009	Mukdahan, Mukdahan Province, Thailand	
64	Win	58–3–2 (1)	Lotlot Gaviola	UD	6	7 Apr 2009	Pathumwan Technology School, Bangkok, Thailand	
63	Draw	57–3–2 (1)	Joel De La Cruz	SD	8	14 Sep 2008	Cebu Coliseum, Cebu City, Philippines	Originally announced as SD win for De La Cruz, later amended to a draw due to an apparent error in the scorecards tally
62	Win	57–3–1 (1)	Zoel Fidal	UD	6	11 Jul 2007	Phra Pradaeng Plaza, Phra Pradaeng, Thailand	
61	Loss	56–3–1 (1)	Poonsawat Kratingdaenggym	TKO	11 (12), 0:37	31 Mar 2008	Hua Mark Indoor Stadium, Bangkok, Thailand	
60	Win	56–2–1 (1)	Jack Asis	UD	8	25 Dec 2007	Phang Nga, Phang Nga Province, Thailand	
59	Win	55–2–1 (1)	Budi Wison	KO	4 (6)	16 Nov 2007	Kanchanadit, Surat Thani, Thailand	
58	Win	54–2–1 (1)	Rivo Rengkung	KO	4 (10)	12 Oct 2007	Chumphon, Chumphon Province, Thailand	
57	Win	53–2–1 (1)	Hendrik	KO	2 (10)	3 Sep 2007	Nongchang District, Uthai Thani, Thailand	
56	Win	52–2–1 (1)	Rey Anton Olarte	UD	6	13 Jul 2007	Photharam, Ratchaburi, Thailand	
55	Win	51–2–1 (1)	Ganzorig Gankhuyag	TKO	4 (10)	8 Jun 2007	Chalor Temple, Nonthaburi, Thailand	
54	Win	50–2–1 (1)	Yuki Murai	UD	6	11 May 2007	Yasothorn, Yasothon Province, Thailand	
53	Win	49–2–1 (1)	Muhammad Afrizal	KO	1 (10)	11 Apr 2007	Sisa Chorakhe Yai, Samut Prakan, Thailand	
52	Win	48–2–1 (1)	Maiko Yombayomba	KO	4 (6)	16 Mar 2007	Thairath 93 School, Prachinburi, Thailand	
51	Win	47–2–1 (1)	Lucas Mathew	KO	1 (6)	16 Feb 2007	Chonburi, Chonburi Province, Thailand	
50	Loss	46–2–1 (1)	Celestino Caballero	TKO	3 (12), 1:48	4 Oct 2006	Wat Ban Rai, Nakhon Ratchasima, Thailand	Lost WBA super bantamweight title
49	Win	46–1–1 (1)	Mahyar Monshipour	TKO	10 (12), 2:42	18 Mar 2006	Palais des sports Marcel-Cerdan, Paris, France	Won WBA super bantamweight title
48	Win	45–1–1 (1)	Adrianus Kaauni	KO	6 (12)	21 Nov 2005	The Mall Shopping Center Ngamwongwan, Bangkok, Thailand	Retained PABA super bantamweight title
47	Win	44–1–1 (1)	Almas Asanov	KO	6 (12), 2:13	19 Sep 2005	Phang Nga, Phang Nga Province, Thailand	Retained PABA super bantamweight title
46	Win	43–1–1 (1)	Vuyisile Bebe	KO	5 (12), 2:49	29 Jun 2005	Thungsrimuang Ground, Ubon Ratchathani, Thailand	Retained PABA super bantamweight title
45	Win	42–1–1 (1)	Zsolt Botos	KO	6 (12), 2:35	19 Apr 2005	Suan Lum Night Bazaar Ratchadaphisek, Bangkok, Thailand	Retained PABA super bantamweight title
44	Win	41–1–1 (1)	Gonzales Bin Anur	TKO	2 (12), 1:22	24 Mar 2004	Central Stadium, Phrae, Thailand	Retained PABA super bantamweight title
43	Win	40–1–1 (1)	Yuri Zharkov	KO	6 (12), 1:57	1 Feb 2005	Donjedee Memorial Ground, Suphan Buri, Thailand	Retained PABA super bantamweight title
42	Win	39–1–1 (1)	Simson Butar Butar	UD	12	13 Aug 2004	Pattaya, Chonburi Province, Thailand	Retained PABA super bantamweight title
41	Win	38–1–1 (1)	Steven Togelang	TKO	2 (12)	29 Apr 2004	Nong Bunmak, Nakhon Ratchasima, Thailand	Retained PABA super bantamweight title
40	Win	37–1–1 (1)	Dondon Lapuz	UD	12	25 Mar 2004	Trat, Trat Province, Thailand	Retained PABA super bantamweight title
39	Win	36–1–1 (1)	Yersin Zhailauov	TKO	7 (12)	27 Feb 2004	Bangkok, Thailand	Retained PABA super bantamweight title
38	Win	35–1–1 (1)	Takhir Ibragimov	TKO	7 (12)	28 Nov 2003	Pan District, Chiang Rai, Thailand	Retained PABA super bantamweight title
37	Win	34–1–1 (1)	Marsel Kasimov	KO	7 (12)	12 Sep 2003	Nong Khai, Nong Khai Province, Thailand	Retained PABA super bantamweight title
36	Win	33–1–1 (1)	Roberto Dalisay	UD	12	1 Aug 2003	The Mall Shopping Center Taphra, Bangkok, Thailand	Retained PABA super bantamweight title
35	Win	32–1–1 (1)	Alex Escaner	UD	12	5 Jun 2003	Uttaradit, Uttaradit Province, Thailand	Retained PABA super bantamweight title
34	Win	31–1–1 (1)	Trevor Gouws	TKO	12 (12)	11 Apr 2003	Lang Suan, Chumphon Province, Thailand	Retained PABA super bantamweight title
33	Win	30–1–1 (1)	Edward Mpofu	TKO	12 (12)	27 Dec 2002	King Taksin Memorial, Bangkok, Thailand	Retained PABA super bantamweight title
32	Win	29–1–1 (1)	Andries Dick	UD	12	14 Nov 2002	Donmuang, Bangkok, Thailand	Retained PABA super bantamweight title
31	Win	28–1–1 (1)	Abram Lubisi	TKO	5 (12)	16 Aug 2002	Chachoengsao, Chachoengsao Province, Thailand	Retained PABA super bantamweight title
30	Win	27–1–1 (1)	Hari Suharyadi	KO	3 (12)	8 Mar 2002	Nakhon Ratchasima, Nakhon Ratchasima Province, Thailand	Won vacant PABA super bantamweight title
29	Win	26–1–1 (1)	Michael Domingo	KO	3 (12)	27 Dec 2001	Bangkok, Thailand	
28	Win	25–1–1 (1)	Allan Morre	KO	2 (12)	26 Oct 2001	Suphan Buri, Suphan Buri Province, Thailand	
27	Win	24–1–1 (1)	Takao Ikeda	KO	7 (12)	9 Jun 2001	Bangkok, Thailand	
26	Win	23–1–1 (1)	Sokso Choi	KO	3	16 Mar 2001	Bangkok, Thailand	
25	Win	22–1–1 (1)	Hasan Ambon	PTS	12	25 Nov 2000	Kanchanaburi, Kanchanaburi Province, Thailand	Retained WBF super bantamweight title
24	Win	21–1–1 (1)	Ahmad Fandi	KO	2	8 Sep 2000	Hat Yai, Songkhla Province, Thailand	
23	Win	20–1–1 (1)	Juni Garbon	KO	2	19 Aug 2000	Sukhothai, Sukhothai Province, Thailand	
22	Win	19–1–1 (1)	Herry Makawimbang	KO	4 (12)	11 Jun 2000	Taipei, Taiwan	Retained WBF super bantamweight title
21	Win	18–1–1 (1)	Alim Archibald	KO	6	3 Mar 2000	Pattaya, Chonburi Province, Thailand	
20	Draw	17–1–1 (1)	Haruhiko Kawai	TD	3 (12)	10 Dec 1999	Suphan Buri, Suphan Buri Province, Thailand	Retained WBF super bantamweight title
19	Win	17–1 (1)	Muhammad Alfaridzi	KO	4 (12)	29 Oct 1999	Lampang, Lampang Province, Thailand	Retained WBF super bantamweight title
18	Win	16–1 (1)	Geoffrey Munika	PTS	12	9 Jul 1999	Ang Thong, Ang Thong Province, Thailand	Retained WBF super bantamweight title
17	Win	15–1 (1)	Sammy Sordilla	KO	5	21 Apr 1999	Bangkok, Thailand	
16	Win	14–1 (1)	Elton Taaibos	KO	5 (12)	27 Dec 1998	Bangkok, Thailand	Won vacant WBF super bantamweight title
15	Win	13–1 (1)	Luyanda Mini	TKO	2 (8)	3 Oct 1998	Sisa Dukashe Stadium, Mdantsane, South Africa	
14	Win	12–1 (1)	Roy Tarazona	KO	2	15 Jul 1998	Bangkok, Thailand	
13	Win	11–1 (1)	Tianchai Korking	KO	5 (10)	22 Apr 1998	Bangkok, Thailand	
12	Loss	10–1 (1)	Ratanachai Sor Vorapin	PTS	10	18 Feb 1998	Bangkok, Thailand	
11	Win	10–0 (1)	Marinki Booi	KO	5 (10)	27 Dec 1997	Provincial Military Stadium, Songkhla, Thailand	
10	Win	9–0 (1)	Fuzi Armes	KO	7	31 May 1997	Garden Hill Village, Petchaboon, Thailand	
9	Win	8–0 (1)	Danny Bularon	KO	2 (6)	13 Apr 1997	Chaiyaphum Stadium, Chaiyaphum, Thailand	
8	Win	7–0 (1)	Ricky Matulessy	KO	11 (12)	7 Dec 1996	Surabaya, East Java, Indonesia	Won IBF Inter-Continental super flyweight title
7	Win	6–0 (1)	Ryan Puma	KO	2 (10)	19 Oct 1996	Bangplee Regional Stadium, Samut Prakan, Thailand	
6	Win	5–0 (1)	Martín Solorio	KO	1 (6)	28 Sep 1096	Provincial Stadium, Prachuap Khiri Khan, Thailand	
5	NC	4–0 (1)	Marlon Carillo	NC	4 (10)	10 Aug 1996	Soccer Stadium, Phitsanulok, Thailand	
4	Win	4–0	Yani Malhendo	PTS	10	4 May 1996	Provincial Stadium, Nan, Thailand	
3	Win	3–0	Ramil Anito	UD	8	16 Mar 1996	Sisaket, Sisaket Province, Thailand	
2	Win	2–0	Kwainoi Sorthanikul	KO	1	24 Jan 1996	Bangkok, Thailand	
1	Win	1–0	Hernfa Kiatvichien	PTS	6	8 Dec 1995	Bangkok, Thailand	

Achievements
Preceded by Mahyar Monshipour	WBA Super Bantamweight Champion; March 18, 2006 - October 4, 2006	Succeeded by Celestino Caballero
Awards
Previous: Diego Corrales vs. José Luis Castillo I	The Ring Fight of the Year vs. Mahyar Monshipour; 2006	Succeeded by Rafael Márquez vs. Israel Vázquez II
Previous: Diego Corrales vs. José Luis Castillo I	BWAA Fight of the Year vs. Mahyar Monshipour; 2006	Succeeded by Kelly Pavlik vs. Jermain Taylor I
Previous: Diego Corrales vs. José Luis Castillo I Round 10	The Ring Round of the Year; Round 10 vs. Mahyar Monshipour; 2006	Succeeded by Rafael Márquez vs. Israel Vázquez II; Round 3
