= Acelino Freitas =

Brazilian boxer and politician

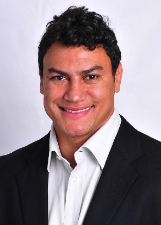

Personal information
- Full name: Acelino de Freitas
- Nickname: Popó
- Born: September 21, 1975 (age 51) Salvador, Bahia, Brazil
- Height: 5 ft 6 in (168 cm)
- Weight: Super featherweight; Lightweight; Light middleweight

Boxing career
- Reach: 69 in (175 cm)
- Stance: Orthodox

Boxing record
- Total fights: 43
- Wins: 41
- Win by KO: 34
- Losses: 2
Medal record
Men's boxing
Representing Brazil
Pan American Games
Silver medal – second place	1995 Mar del Plata	Lightweight

Acelino "Popó" de Freitas (Portuguese pronunciation: [asɛˈlĩnu pɔˈpɔ ˈfɾejtɐs]; born September 21, 1975) is a Brazilian politician and a former professional boxer who competed between 1995 and 2017. He is a world champion in two weight classes, having held the WBO super featherweight title from 1999 to 2004, the WBA (Unified) super featherweight title from 2002 to 2004, and the WBO lightweight title twice between 2004 and 2007. After retiring from boxing, Freitas went into politics, and was elected as a legislator for the state of Bahia, from 2011 to 2014. His nickname, Popó, was given to him by his mother, after the sound that babies make while drinking milk.

== Early life ==
Freitas had a difficult childhood, often sleeping on a sandy floor at his house. Since early in his life, he dreamed of a better place to live for his family. A skilled football player, he was more inclined, however, towards the sport of boxing since an early age. He was heavily influenced by his father and brothers, especially Luis Claudio Freitas. Fellow Brazilian Eder Jofre, generally recognized as the greatest world champion to come out of that country, was one of Freitas' childhood heroes.

== Amateur career ==
Freitas competed for his native country and won a lightweight silver medal at the Pan American Games 1995 in Mar del Plata.

== Professional career ==
=== Early success ===
After the Pan American Games he turned into a professional boxer on July 14, 1995, against Adriano Jose Soares. With his win by knockout in the first round that night, Freitas set off a streak of 29 knockout wins in a row, which places as one of the longest knockout wins streak in boxing history. His first 10 wins were against low level competition, but for fight number 11, he took on the much more experienced Edwin Vazquez, knocking him out in the seventh round.

Between 1997 and 1998, Freitas won four more fights and then took on Francisco Tomas Da Cruz, a former world title challenger of Julio César Chávez. Freitas handled Da Cruz with a knockout in two rounds and then added three more knockout wins before getting his first world title shot.

=== First World Title ===
On August 7, 1999, Freitas knocked out WBO Junior Lightweight Champion Anatoly Alexandrov in the first round. Soon after, he signed a contract with cable TV giant Showtime, which began to telecast Freitas' fights to the United States. Freitas then made five defenses of his world title and had one non-title bout, all of which ended in knockout wins. He then went to London and took only 45 seconds to stop Daniel Alicea in another non-title affair. Freitas then beat the former world champion: Al Kotey, the brother of David 'Poison' Kotei, by a ten-round decision.

=== Freitas vs Casamayor ===
On January 12, 2002, Freitas decided to sign for a unification bout with the WBA world champion, Joel Casamayor, a Cuban refugee who resides in Florida. In a rousing super featherweight unification title bout battle between unbeaten champions, a controversial knockdown and a blatant foul cost Casamayor his unblemished record and his title as Freitas won a close 12 round unanimous decision.

In a classic boxing confrontation between the Brazilian bomber Freitas (129½) and the Cuban boxer Casamayor (129½), the fighters switched roles midway through their encounter in what was reminiscent of Sugar Ray Leonard's first historic face-off with Thomas "Hitman" Hearns back in 1981. The scientist Casamayor became the aggressive slugger, while the puncher Freitas turned into the boxer as once again the unpredictable transpired in a mega-fight.

A glancing right-hand to the neck of the off-balanced Casamayor in the 3rd round was ruled a knockdown by referee Joe Cortez and intentionally hitting on the break in the 6th saw the Cuban penalized another point. It was the difference in the finale tallies and the two point cushion that the tiring Freitas retained across the boards on all three judges scorecards. Ring officials Robert Byrd, Bill Graham and Dave Moretti having identical scores of 114 to 112 for the Brazilian.

=== After Casamayor ===
Next, he went to Phoenix, to fight Nigerian Daniel Attah, with only the WBO belt on the line, winning a 12-round decision on August 3, 2002. The fight was watched by an estimated 91 million viewers in Brazil.

Freitas then retained the title in Chicago with a fourth-round knockout of Juan Carlos Ramirez. On August 9, 2003, he and Jorge Barrios engaged in what Showtime commentator Steve Albert called a candidate for fight of the year. Freitas was floored in rounds eight and eleven, but retaliated with a knockdown of his own towards the end of the eleventh, and ended up retaining the title by knockout in round twelve.

Freitas began 2004 by winning a 12-round unanimous decision over Artur Grigorian on January 4, to become the WBO's world Lightweight champion. On February 1 of that year, the WBA announced it had named Freitas their 2003 Fighter of the year.

=== Freitas vs Corrales ===
On August 7, 2004, Freitas lost for the first time, losing his WBO Lightweight title to Diego Corrales by TKO in the tenth round after being knocked down by a left hook in Connecticut.

=== After Corrales ===
On April 29, 2006, Freitas defeated Zahir Raheem for the vacant WBO lightweight title by split decision. Freitas announced his retirement as a professional boxer on October 4, 2006. Later on, he announced his come back from retirement, and the WBO re-instated him as their lightweight champion.

On April 28, 2007, he fought Juan Diaz in Mashantucket, USA, losing by TKO after his trainer stopped the bout at the beginning the 9th round, drawing boos from the crowd.

He has fought three times since his last loss (2012, 2015, and most recently in November 2017), all wins against inferior competition and all in South America (two wins by knockout and one win by 8-round unanimous decision).

== Personal life ==
Freitas' childhood hero was Brazilian boxer Eder Jofre. His career in boxing was influenced by his older brother Luis Claudio Freitas.

Freitas' married wife Eliana Guimarães in 2001, they divorced in 2003.

He was Secretary of Sports in Salvador and is member of Brazilian Republican Party.

The careers of Acelino Freitas and Luis Claudio Freitas are depicted in the 2019 biographical TV series Irmãos Freitas, directed by Walter Salles and Sérgio Machado. Brazilian actors Daniel Rocha and Rômulo Braga co-star as Acelino Freitas and Luis Claudio Freitas respectively.

In 2024, Acelino Freitas performed cosplayed as chimarrão in the reality singing competition The Masked Singer Brasil.

== Professional boxing record ==
43 fights	41 wins	2 losses
By knockout	34	2
By decision	7	0

No.	Result	Record	Opponent	Type	Round, time	Date	Location	Notes
43	Win	41–2	Gabriel Martinez	UD	8	Nov 11, 2017	Arena Guilherme Paraense, Belém, Pará, Brazil	
42	Win	40–2	Mateo Damian Veron	TKO	3 (10), 1:09	Aug 15, 2015	Arena Santos, Santos, São Paulo, Brazil	
41	Win	39–2	Michael Oliveira	TKO	9 (10), 2:19	Jun 2, 2012	Hotel & Casino Conrad, Punta del Este	
40	Loss	38–2	Juan Díaz	RTD	8 (12), 3:00	Apr 28, 2007	Foxwoods Resort, Mashantucket, Connecticut	Lost WBO lightweight title; For WBA lightweight title
39	Win	38–1	Zahir Raheem	SD	12	Apr 29, 2006	Foxwoods Resort, Mashantucket, Connecticut	Won vacant WBO lightweight title
38	Win	37–1	Fabian Salazar	KO	1 (10), 2:28	Jul 16, 2005	Ginásio Antônio Balbino, Salvador, Bahia	
37	Win	36–1	David Saucedo	UD	10	Dec 11, 2004	Ginásio do Ibirapuera, São Paulo, São Paulo	
36	Loss	35–1	Diego Corrales	TKO	10 (12), 1:24	Aug 7, 2004	Foxwoods Resort, Mashantucket, Connecticut	Lost WBO lightweight title
35	Win	35–0	Artur Grigorian	UD	12	Jan 3, 2004	Foxwoods Resort, Mashantucket, Connecticut	Won WBO lightweight title
34	Win	34–0	Jorge Rodrigo Barrios	TKO	12 (12), 0:50	Aug 9, 2003	Miami Arena, Miami	Retained WBA (Unified) and WBO super featherweight titles
33	Win	33–0	Juan Carlos Ramírez	TKO	4 (12), 0:19	Mar 15, 2003	UIC Pavilion, Chicago, Illinois	Retained WBA (Unified) and WBO super featherweight titles
32	Win	32–0	Daniel Attah	UD	12	Aug 3, 2002	Dodge Theater, Phoenix, Arizona	Retained WBA (Super) and WBO super featherweight titles
31	Win	31–0	Joel Casamayor	UD	12	Jan 12, 2002	Cox Pavilion, Las Vegas	Retained WBO super featherweight title; Won WBA (Super) super featherweight title
30	Win	30–0	Alfred Kotey	UD	10	Sep 29, 2001	Miccosukee Indian Gaming Resort, Miami	
29	Win	29–0	Orlando Soto	KO	1 (12), 2:13	Jan 27, 2001	Ginásio Nilson Nelson, Brasília	Retained WBO super featherweight title
28	Win	28–0	Daniel Alicea	TKO	1 (12), 1:01	Dec 16, 2000	Sheffield Arena, Sheffield, Yorkshire	
27	Win	27–0	Carlos Rios	TKO	9 (12), 1:18	Sep 23, 2000	Casino Rama, Rama, Ontario	Retained WBO super featherweight title
26	Win	26–0	Lemuel Nelson	TKO	2 (12), 2:59	Jun 10, 2000	Fox Theater, Detroit, Michigan	Retained WBO super featherweight title
25	Win	25–0	Javier Jáuregui	KO	1 (12), 1:25	Mar 18, 2000	Credicard Hall, São Paulo, São Paulo	Retained WBO super featherweight title
24	Win	24–0	Barry Jones	TKO	8 (12), 0:50	Jan 15, 2000	Doncaster Dome, Doncaster, Yorkshire	Retained WBO super featherweight title
23	Win	23–0	Claudio Victor Martinet	KO	3 (10)	Dec 18, 1999	Ginásio Antônio Balbino, Salvador, Bahia	
22	Win	22–0	Anthony Martinez	TKO	2 (12), 1:20	Oct 26, 1999	Ginásio Antônio Balbino, Salvador, Bahia	Retained WBO super featherweight title
21	Win	21–0	Anatoly Alexandrov	KO	1 (12), 1:41	Aug 7, 1999	La Palestre, Le Cannet, Alpes-Maritimes	Won WBO super featherweight title
20	Win	20–0	Juan Angel Macias	KO	8 (12)	Apr 2, 1999	Grand Hotel, Tijuana, Baja California	Retained WBO-NABO super featherweight title
19	Win	19–0	Peter Buckley	RTD	3 (8), 3:00	Dec 19, 1998	Everton Park Sports Centre, Liverpool, Merseyside	
18	Win	18–0	Jose Luis Montes	TKO	1 (12)	Oct 16, 1998	Teatro Mutualista, Tijuana, Baja California, Merseyside	Won WBO-NABO super featherweight title
17	Win	17–0	Francisco Tomas Da Cruz	TKO	2 (12)	Sep 15, 1998	Ginásio do Ibirapuera, São Paulo, São Paulo	Retained Brazilian lightweight title
16	Win	16–0	Juan Gutierrez	TKO	1 (12)	Aug 14, 1998	Auditorio del Estado, Mexicali, Baja California	
15	Win	15–0	Rafael Oliveira	KO	3 (10), 1:58	Jun 8, 1998	Arrowhead Pond, Anaheim, California	
14	Win	14–0	Rildo José Oliveira	TKO	1 (12)	May 29, 1998	Ginásio Antônio Balbino, Salvador, Bahia	Won Brazilian lightweight title
13	Win	13–0	Gustavo Rodolfo Sayaavedra	KO	1 (10)	Nov 19, 1997	Ginásio Antônio Balbino, Salvador, Bahia	
12	Win	12–0	Edwin Vazquez	TKO	7 (12)	Sep 2, 1997	Belle Casino, Baton Rouge, Louisiana	
11	Win	11–0	Hilario Guzman	TKO	8 (10), 1:57	Jun 27, 1997	Mahi Temple Shrine Auditorium, Miami	
10	Win	10–0	Johnny Montantes	TKO	1 (8), 2:39	May 10, 1997	Unknown, San José, Costa Rica	
9	Win	9–0	Arcelio Diaz	TKO	1 (12)	Apr 22, 1997	Ginásio Antônio Balbino, Salvador, Bahia	Won IBF Latino lightweight title
8	Win	8–0	Antonio Maria Do Nascimento	KO	2 (6)	Mar 8, 1997	Ginásio Antônio Balbino, Salvador, Bahia	
7	Win	7–0	Hamilton Cerqueira	KO	4 (6)	Feb 1, 1997	Ginásio Antônio Balbino, Salvador, Bahia	
6	Win	6–0	Gutemberg Ferreira	KO	2 (12)	Aug 16, 1996	Ginásio Antônio Balbino, Salvador, Bahia	Won WBC Mundo Hispano lightweight title
5	Win	5–0	Ralph Riveros	KO	2 (6)	Apr 2, 1996	Ginásio Antônio Balbino, Salvador, Bahia	
4	Win	4–0	Marco De Lima	TKO	3 (6)	Nov 14, 1995	Ginásio Antônio Balbino, Salvador, Bahia	
3	Win	3–0	Manoel Oliveira da Cruz	KO	2 (4)	Sep 18, 1995	Ginásio Antônio Balbino, Salvador, Bahia	
2	Win	2–0	Valdevino Monteiro	KO	1 (4)	Aug 14, 1995	Ginásio Antônio Balbino, Salvador, Bahia	
1	Win	1–0	Jose Adriano Soares	KO	1 (4)	Jul 14, 1995	Ginásio Antônio Balbino, Salvador, Bahia	

== Exhibition boxing record ==
8 fights	7 wins	0 losses
By knockout	3	0
By decision	3	0
By disqualification	1	0
Draws	1	

No.	Result	Record	Opponent	Type	Round, time	Date	Location	Notes
8	Win	7–0–1	Whindersson Nunes	UD	8	30 May 2026	São Paulo, São Paulo , Brazil	
7	Win	6–0–1	Wanderlei Silva	DQ	4 (8), 1:34	27 Sep 2025	São Paulo, São Paulo , Brazil	Silva disqualified for repeated fouls.
6	Win	5–0–1	Duda Nagle	UD	8	17 May 2025	São Paulo, São Paulo , Brazil	
5	Win	4–0–1	Jorge Daniel Miranda	UD	8	12 Oct 2024	São Paulo, São Paulo , Brazil	
4	Win	3–0–1	Kleber Pedra "Bambam"	TKO	1 (8), 0:36	24 Feb 2024	Vivo Vibra São Paulo, São Paulo, São Paulo , Brazil	
3	Win	2–0–1	Junior Dublê	TKO	1 (8), 1:21	26 Aug 2023	São Paulo, São Paulo , Brazil	
2	Win	1–0–1	Jose Landi-Jons "Pelé"	TKO	1 (8), 1:25	25 Sep 2022	Arena Athletico Paranaense, Curitiba, Parana, Brazil	
1	Draw	0–0–1	Whindersson Nunes	UD	8	30 Jan 2022	Music Park, Balneário Camboriú, Brazil	

== Titles in boxing ==
=== Major world titles ===
- WBA (Super & Unified) super featherweight champion (130 lbs)
- WBO super featherweight champion (130 lbs)
- WBO lightweight champion (135 lbs) (2x)

=== Regional/International titles ===
- WBO-NABO super featherweight champion (130 lbs)
- Brazilian lightweight champion (135 lbs)
- IBF Latino lightweight champion (135 lbs)
- WBC Mundo Hispano lightweight champion (135 lbs)

== Television viewership ==
=== Brazil ===
Date	Fight	Network	Viewership (est.)	Source(s)
3 August 2002	Acelino Freitas vs. Daniel Attah	Globo	91,000,000	
	Total viewership		91,000,000	

== See also ==
- List of world lightweight boxing champions

Sporting positions
World boxing titles
Preceded by Anatoly Alexandrov	WBO super featherweight champion August 7, 1999 – January 18, 2004; Vacated	Vacant Title next held by Diego Corrales
Preceded by Joel Casamayor as Champion	WBA super featherweight champion Super title January 12, 2002 – February 10, 2004; Vacated; Status changed to Unified champion from August 5, 2002	Succeeded by Yodsanan Sor Nanthachai as Champion
Preceded by Artur Grigorian	WBO lightweight champion January 3, 2004 – August 7, 2004	Succeeded by Diego Corrales
Vacant Title last held by Diego Corrales	WBO lightweight champion April 29, 2006 – April 28, 2007	Succeeded by Juan Díaz
Awards
Preceded by Micky Ward vs. Arturo Gatti I Round 9	The Ring magazine Round of the Year; Round 5 vs. Jorge Rodrigo Barrios; 2003	Succeeded by Marco Antonio Barrera vs. Erik Morales; Round 11
