= Mahyar Monshipour =

French boxer

Personal information
- Nickname: Little Tyson
- Nationality: French
- Born: Mahyar Monshipour Kermani; March 21, 1975 (age 51) Bam, Iran
- Height: 5 ft 4 1/2 in (164 cm)
- Weight: Super Bantamweight

Boxing career
- Stance: Orthodox

Boxing record
- Total fights: 37
- Wins: 31
- Win by KO: 21
- Losses: 4
- Draws: 2
- No contests: 0

Mahyar Monshipour (Persian: مهیار منشی‌پور; born 21 March 1975 in Tehran, Iran) is an Iranian-born French boxer who was the World Boxing Association's super bantamweight champion for nearly three years between 2003 and 2006. He lost his belt to Thai Somsak Sithchatchawal on 18 March 2006, in a match that won The Ring Fight of the Year and the Boxing Writers Association of America's "Fight of the Year" known as the Harry Markson Award.

== Early career ==
At age 11, due to the start of the Iran–Iraq War, his father sent him to Poitiers, France with his aunt Mahnaz. After his minor amateur career, Mayhar Monshipour turned professional on October 26, 1996 by knocking out Karim Azagzaoui during the 6th round in a rather rough fight. He then went on to win 5 consecutive matches, all ending in knockouts. At the time, his style was already that of a slugger, but he started boxing on his opponents without protecting himself and his only technique was to “jump headlong”. In December 1997, he fought the Congolese Euloge Makiza Sita (8 wins and 2 losses). Monshipour showed to be stronger but made the mistake of not protecting himself. Being the more powerful fighter, he sent Sita to the mat twice causing Sita to lose points.

Mayhar Monshipour found victory once again by beating Medhi Path in seconds. This victory was a new personal record for Mayhar because it was the only time he got a KO in the first round. After another victory, he goes on to fight the Hungarian Sandor hope Koczak (7 fights, 7 wins). From the 1st round Monshipour is dominant and sends him to the mat. But in the second round, Koczak elbows Monshipour in the eye. Not only was Koczak not sanctioned, but Monshipour stopped the fight in the third round for the broad caused injury.

== His Ascension ==
From that defeat, Monshipour will later experience an unbeaten 8 years. He obtained 8 wins (5 KO).

His style later changed: Mahyar would still advance on his opponents but became a more technical slugger. He would dodge blows while also dealing out attacks to the body never yielding an inch to his opponents. The first to confront this is the British, Michael Adlis who exhausted by the roller abandoned the fight in the fourth round. On January 18, 2002, he won the title Champion of France super bantamweight by knocking out Salem Bouaita in the 9th round. He defended his title once again against Frederick Bonifai (this will be his last win on points). On September 13, 2002 he acquired the European title against the Franco- Turkish Tuncay Kaya in just 6 rounds. He retains this title two times against Mustapha Hame (KO in the 6th round) and Germán Guartos (KO in the 3rd round).

== World championships ==
On July 4, 2003, Mahyar Monshipour applied for a first world title match. He faces a friend, the world champion super bantamweight WBA Salim Medjkoune at Futuroscope in Poitiers. True to his promise, Monshipour put up a fight from the very beginning, The fight was transforming rapidly into a real war, between two men going blow for blow. In the last round, the challenger Mahyar Monshipour (leading Salim Medjkoune to two of the three judges, 107-102 and 106-104 to 104-104) continues the pace. With a right hook to the chin that abruptly ended the fight after 1 minute and 27 seconds, Medjkoune heavily collapses to the ground and remained there for several minutes before getting up to the cheers of 4,300 spectators that were relieved for his well being. Monshipour became the new world champion WBA.

Soon after his story inspired television and he becomes one of the few French boxers to be invited to boxing debates. He created in 2003 the association France-Bam to help the Iranians to Bam.

On December 16, 2003, he defended his title for the first time against Jairo Tagliaferro, a hard to fight Venezuelan, Monshipour forced him down in the 8th recovery.

He later faces Medjkoune for a second time. After a good start to the fight, Salim Medjkoune was gradually worn down by the wide hooks of the titleholder. Having proved himself once in the 5th round, he resumed the 7th round exhausted. But the end was coming as a right hook to the body sends down Salim Medjkoune in the 8th round. After an eight count by the referee, Medjkoune continues the battle to later return to the ground and his corner threw in the towel.

Monshipour still defends his title two more times before facing Shigeru Nakazato, a boxer who had unsuccessfully tried twice to take a world title. From the initial sound of the bell, Nakazato suddenly advanced on the defending champion. Both boxers had similar attributes but the power, vitality and precision of the French boxer will give him the advantage. With a right hook in the third round, will eventually prove be too much for the Japanese, bringing him down shortly. During the sixth round, a right from Monshipour shakes Nakazato. Moments later, another right sends him to the mat, this time for the count.

In 2005 (during his last victory), he confronts a former champion: Julio Zárate . Mahyar went into a fight against an opponent who truly came to win. Against all odds, the lanky Mexican chooses to attack from the start, and surprised the defending champion several times, especially with very good uppercuts to the body and face. In the 4th round, after a chain of left and right hooks Monshipour gets hit in the chin and collapses to the mat. He continues the battle and manages to reach the end of the round. Mid fight, the situation gets difficult for the Poitevin who is three points behind. But due to counting his physical and fabulous will Monshipour makes a comeback. From the seventh round, the juggernaut starts suffocating Zárate who uses other resources including his head to try to slow the advance of Monshipour. Zárate will receive two warnings (7th and 8th rounds) before giving up the appeal in the 9th round.

== Fight Of The Year ==
On March 18, 2006, in Levallois-Perret, Monshipour defended his belt for the sixth time, this time against the Thai Somsak Sithchatchawal. True to his simple tactic of demolishing opponents, the Poitevin seeks victory. Exhausted, and gasping for air, he was defeated by a boxer who proved ultimately more lucid. Knocked down early on, Monshipour was nevertheless able to make up ground. But he never managed to bend his opponent. A terrible counter in the 6th recovery had seriously shaken the Frenchman. In the 9th and 10th round, Somsak Sithchatchawal threw a barrage of shots that prompted the referee to end the fight.

Monshipour decided to end his career after this fight.

Even though defeated, this was crowned fight of the year in 2006. This is the third time a Frenchman, after Georges Carpentier in 1924 and in 1950 Laurent Dauthuille won this honour.

== The Return of Monshipour ==
On October 8, 2008, Monshipour announced his comeback two and a half years after his last fight. On December 1, 2008, he beat Emiliano Salvini by disqualification during the 6th round and defeated Sean Hughes by referee stoppage in the 8th round on January 24, 2009 and defeated Felix Machado March 13, 2009 by abandoning the call of the 5th round. On July 4, 2009, he faces world title WBA of bantamweight reigning champion Anselmo Moreno but lost points in Poitiers.

== Honours ==
- 37 fights, 31 wins (21 by KO)
- Winner of the professional cutting France 2001
- Champion of France 2002
- European Champion in 2002
- WBA world super bantamweight Champion (2003-2006):
- Winner against the title holder Salim Medjkoune on 4 July 2003 at the Futuroscope.
- Retains Title December 16, 2003 against Tagliaferro (Levallois-Perret), 27 May 2004 against S. Medjkoune (Clermont-Ferrand), November 8, 2004 against Sithyodthong (Paris-Bercy), April 29, 2005 against Nakazato (to Marseille) and 25 June 2005 against Mexican Julio Zarate (Futuroscope).
- He is also decorated with the National Order of Merit, awarded both his sporting and social success.

== Miscellaneous ==
- He is deputy director of the sports department of the [General Council of Vienna] (June 2006 - 2011)
- He is national adviser of the Ministry of Health, Youth and Sports (1 May 2011)

Achievements
Preceded by Salim Medjkoune	WBA Super Bantamweight Champion; July 4, 2003 - March 18, 2006	Succeeded by Somsak Sithchatchawal
Awards
Previous: Diego Corrales vs. José Luis Castillo I	The Ring Fight of the Year vs. Somsak Sithchatchawal; 2006	Succeeded by Rafael Márquez vs. Israel Vázquez II
Previous: Diego Corrales vs. José Luis Castillo I	BWAA Fight of the Year vs. Somsak Sithchatchawal; 2006	Succeeded by Kelly Pavlik vs. Jermain Taylor I
Previous: Diego Corrales vs. José Luis Castillo I Round 10	The Ring Round of the Year; Round 10 vs. Somsak Sithchatchawal; 2006	Succeeded by Rafael Márquez vs. Israel Vázquez II; Round 3
