= Miguel Ángel Huerta =

Mexican boxer (born 1978)

Personal information
- Nickname: El Anestesista
- Born: Miguel Ángel Huerta Medina; October 1, 1978 (age 47) Ecatepec de Morelos, México, Mexico
- Height: 1.74 m (5 ft 9 in)
- Weight: Welterweight; Light Welterweight; Lightweight

Boxing career
- Reach: 180 cm (71 in)
- Stance: Southpaw

Boxing record
- Total fights: 44
- Wins: 28
- Win by KO: 18
- Losses: 15
- Draws: 1
- No contests: 0

Miguel Ángel Huerta Medina (born October 1, 1978) is a Mexican professional boxer. He's the former NABF, WBO Inter-Continental Lightweight and NBA Light Welterweight Champion.

== Professional career ==
On October 19, 2002 Hector knocked out the veteran José Luis Soto Karass in a bout held at the Arena Mexico in Mexico City.

Huerta then upset Denmark's Allan Vester to win the NBA Light Welterweight title. In August 2007 he beat title contender Efren Hinojosa to capture the NABF Lightweight title.

Miguel would then go onto lose a fight with undefeated Mike Alvarado.
