= Julio Díaz (boxer) =

Mexican boxer (born 1979)

Personal information
- Nickname: The Kidd
- Born: Julio C. Díaz; December 24, 1979 (age 46) Jiquilpan, Michoacán, Mexico
- Height: 5 ft 9 in (175 cm)
- Weight: Lightweight; Light welterweight Welterweight

Boxing career
- Reach: 69 in (175 cm)
- Stance: Orthodox

Boxing record
- Total fights: 51
- Wins: 40
- Win by KO: 29
- Losses: 10
- Draws: 1

Julio Díaz (born December 24, 1979) is a Mexican former professional boxer who is a Former IBF Lightweight World Champion the brother of boxing trainer Joel Díaz and former world champion Antonio Díaz.

== Professional career ==
Diaz captured the IBF interim lightweight title with a win over Ricky Quiles in 2006 and then the full IBF lightweight title with a knockout win over Jesús Chávez in February 2007.

On October 13, 2007, Diaz lost his title to the Mexican American Juan Díaz. After a third round knockout loss to Keith Thurman in 2014, Diaz announced his retirement.

== Professional boxing record ==
51 fights	40 wins	10 losses
By knockout	29	6
By decision	11	4
Draws	1	

No.	Result	Record	Opponent	Type	Round, time	Date	Location	Notes
51	Loss	40–10–1	Keith Thurman	RTD	3 (12), 3:00	Apr 26, 2014	StubHub Center, Carson, California, US	For WBA interim welterweight title
50	Loss	40–9–1	Shawn Porter	UD	10	Sep 12, 2013	MGM Grand, Premier Ballroom, Las Vegas, Nevada, US	For NABO and vacant IBF North American welterweight titles
49	Loss	40–8–1	Amir Khan	UD	12	Apr 27, 2013	Sheffield Arena, Sheffield, Yorkshire, England, UK	
48	Draw	40–7–1	Shawn Porter	SD	10	Dec 15, 2012	Sports Arena, Los Angeles, California, US	
47	Win	40–7	Hector Sanchez	TKO	5 (10), 2:03	Sep 29, 2011	Fantasy Springs Casino, Indio, California, US	
46	Win	39–7	Henry Aurad	KO	5 (10), 2:37	Jul 28, 2011	Fantasy Springs Casino, Indio, California, US	
45	Loss	38–7	Kendall Holt	TKO	8 (10), 2:37	May 13, 2011	Chumash Casino, Santa Ynez, California, US	
44	Win	38–6	Pavel Miranda	TKO	8 (10), 2:17	Jan 29, 2011	Silverdome, Pontiac, Michigan, US	
43	Win	37–6	Hermann Ngoudjo	UD	10	May 14, 2010	Buffalo Bill's Star Arena, Primm, Nevada, US	
42	Loss	36–6	Victor Cayo	UD	10	Jul 31, 2009	Seminole Hard Rock Hotel and Casino, Hollywood, California, US	
41	Loss	36–5	Rolando Reyes	TKO	5 (10), 2:17	Apr 4, 2009	Frank Erwin Center, Austin, Texas, US	
40	Win	36–4	Fernando Trejo	UD	10	Oct 31, 2008	Hard Rock Hotel and Casino, Las Vegas, Nevada, US	
39	Win	35–4	David Torres	TKO	5 (10), 1:25	Jun 25, 2008	Playboy Mansion, Beverly Hills, California, US	
38	Loss	34–4	Juan Díaz	TKO	9 (12), 0:01	Oct 13, 2007	Sears Centre, Hoffman Estates, Illinois, US	Lost IBF lightweight title; For WBA (Undisputed) and WBO lightweight titles
37	Win	34–3	Jesús Chávez	UD	12	Feb 3, 2007	Silver Spurs Arena, Kissimmee, Florida, US	Won IBF lightweight title
36	Win	33–3	Ricky Quiles	UD	12	May 18, 2006	Seminole Hard Rock Hotel and Casino, Hollywood, California, US	Won vacant interim IBF lightweight title
35	Win	32–3	Russell Stoner Jones	KO	1 (10), 1:59	Aug 9, 2005	Camp Pendleton, Oceanside, California, US	
34	Win	31–3	Marco Angel Pérez	TKO	1 (10), 1:06	Jun 7, 2005	Sycuan Casino, El Cajon, California, US	
33	Loss	30–3	José Luis Castillo	TKO	10 (12), 2:23	Mar 5, 2005	Mandalay Bay Resort & Casino, Las Vegas, Nevada, US	For WBC and The Ring lightweight titles
32	Win	30–2	Javier Jáuregui	MD	12	May 13, 2004	Sports Arena, San Diego, California, US	Won IBF lightweight title
31	Win	29–2	Courtney Burton	TKO	11 (12), 2:38	Mar 19, 2004	Memorial Coliseum, Corpus Christi, Texas, US	
30	Win	28–2	Miguel Angel Huerta	TKO	8 (10), 0:10	Jun 27, 2003	Memorial Coliseum, Corpus Christi, Texas, US	
29	Win	27–2	Ernesto Zepeda	TKO	7 (12), 1:07	Mar 22, 2003	Mandalay Bay Resort & Casino, Las Vegas, Nevada, US	Won vacant WBC Latino lightweight title
28	Win	26–2	Felix St. Kitts	TKO	4 (10)	Nov 23, 2002	Arrowhead Pond, Anaheim, California, US	
27	Win	25–2	James Crayton	UD	10	Sep 13, 2002	Mandalay Bay Resort & Casino, Las Vegas, Nevada, US	
26	Loss	24–2	Juan Valenzuela	TKO	1 (10), 1:56	Apr 26, 2002	Palace Indian Gaming Center, Lemoore, California, US	
25	Win	24–1	Verdell Smith	RTD	8 (10)	Jan 18, 2002	Hollywood Palladium, Hollywood, California, US	
24	Loss	23–1	Angel Manfredy	SD	12	Oct 6, 2001	Memorial Coliseum, Corpus Christi, Texas, US	
23	Win	23–0	Dairo Esalas	KO	4 (10), 2:12	Aug 7, 2001	Belterra Casino Resort, Elizabeth, New Jersey, US	
22	Win	22–0	Justo Sencion	KO	9 (12), 1:10	Apr 28, 2001	Hammerstein Ballroom, New York City, New York, US	Won vacant NABF lightweight title
21	Win	21–0	Bernard Harris	UD	10	Mar 4, 2001	Peppermill Hotel & Casino, Reno, Nevada, US	
20	Win	20–0	Juan Angel Macias	UD	10	Jan 21, 2001	Peppermill Hotel & Casino, Reno, Nevada, US	
19	Win	19–0	Eduardo Perez	TKO	6 (10), 1:13	Dec 3, 2000	Plaza Hotel & Casino, Las Vegas, Nevada, US	
18	Win	18–0	Gerardo Mijares	TKO	3 (8), 2:45	Oct 8, 2000	Plaza Hotel & Casino, Las Vegas, Nevada, US	
17	Win	17–0	Awel Abdulai	TKO	5 (8), 0:58	Aug 27, 2000	Union Plaza Casino, Las Vegas, Nevada, US	
16	Win	16–0	Luis Alfonso Lizarraga	TKO	5 (6), 0:55	Jun 16, 2000	Fantasy Springs Casino, Indio, California, US	
15	Win	15–0	Luis Alfonso Lizarraga	KO	6 (6)	May 19, 2000	Playboy Mansion, Beverly Hills, California, US	
14	Win	14–0	Jose Luis Montes	KO	2 (4)	Mar 25, 2000	Huntington Park Casino, Huntington Park, California, US	
13	Win	13–0	Alfredo Bahena	KO	3 (6)	Mar 11, 2000	Fantasy Springs Casino, Indio, California, US	
12	Win	12–0	Jose Manjarrez	UD	4	Feb 4, 2000	Fantasy Springs Casino, Indio, California, US	
11	Win	11–0	Juan Roberto Colin	UD	6	Dec 18, 1999	Fantasy Springs Casino, Indio, California, US	
10	Win	10–0	Terry Evans	KO	5 (?)	Dec 3, 1999	Pechanga Resort & Casino, Temecula, California, US	
9	Win	9–0	Ramon Acuna	TKO	1 (?)	Nov 5, 1999	Pechanga Resort & Casino, Temecula, California, US	
8	Win	8–0	Mahan Washington	UD	6	Sep 17, 1999	All American Sports Park, Las Vegas, Nevada, US	
7	Win	7–0	Aaron Flores	KO	3 (4)	Aug 27, 1999	Tijuana, Mexico	
6	Win	6–0	Juan Antonio Gonzalez	UD	4	Aug 20, 1999	Pechanga Resort & Casino, Temecula, California, US	
5	Win	5–0	Faustino Sandoval	KO	1 (4)	Aug 6, 1999	Frontón Palacio Jai Alai, Tijuana, Mexico	
4	Win	4–0	Francisco Maldonado	KO	1 (4), 2:59	May 7, 1999	All American Sports Park, Las Vegas, Nevada, US	
3	Win	3–0	Oscar Jackson	KO	2 (4)	Apr 17, 1999	Fantasy Springs Casino, Indio, California, US	
2	Win	2–0	Juan Pablo Rivas	TKO	3 (4)	Mar 6, 1999	Fantasy Springs Casino, Indio, California, US	
1	Win	1–0	Carlos Rodriguez	KO	1 (4), 2:37	Feb 6, 1999	Big League Dreams Sports Park, Cathedral City, California, US	

== See also ==
- List of IBF World Champions
- List of Lightweight Boxing Champions
- List of Boxing Families
- List of Mexican boxing world champions

Achievements
Preceded by Javier Jáuregui	IBF Lightweight Champion; May 13, 2004 – March 1, 2005; Vacated	Succeeded by Leavander Johnson
New title	IBF lightweight interim champion May 18, 2006 – February 3, 2007; Won full title	Vacant Title next held by Raymond Muratalla
Preceded by Jesús Chávez	IBF Lightweight Champion; February 3, 2007 – October 13, 2007	Succeeded by Juan Díaz
