= Iván Popoca =

Mexican boxer (born 1982)

Personal information
- Nationality: (Mexico) Mexican
- Born: Rey Iván Popoca; February 26, 1982 (age 44) Landa, Guerrero, Mexico
- Height: 5 ft 8 in (174 cm)
- Weight: Light Welterweight

Boxing career
- Reach: 71 in (180 cm)
- Stance: Orthodox

Boxing record
- Total fights: 18
- Wins: 15
- Win by KO: 10
- Losses: 2
- Draws: 1
- No contests: 0

Rey Iván Popoca (born February 26, 1982) is a Mexican former professional boxer.

== Amateur career ==
A construction worker by day, Popoca still managed to run his amateur record to an outstanding 137-13.

== Professional career ==
Popoca put on an impressive performance against a very slick Mike Gonzalez (10-6-1, 9 KOs), knocking him out in the sixth round. He suffered his first defeat on April 15, 2011 against Ruslan Provodnikov. He suffered his second defeat on July 13, 2012 against Jose Louis Castillo via eighth-round TKO.
