= Floyd Mayweather Jr. vs. Andre Berto =

Boxing match

High Stakes
- Date: September 12, 2015
- Venue: MGM Grand Garden Arena, Paradise, Nevada, U.S.
- Title(s) on the line: WBA (Unified), WBC and The Ring welterweight titles

Tale of the tape
Boxer	Floyd Mayweather Jr.	Andre Berto
Nickname	"Money"	"The Beast"
Hometown	Las Vegas, Nevada, U.S.	Winter Haven, Florida, U.S.
Purse	$32,000,000	$4,000,000
Pre-fight record	48–0 (26 KO)	30–3 (23 KO)
Age	38 years, 6 months	32 years
Height	5 ft 8 in (173 cm)	5 ft 6 1/2 in (169 cm)
Weight	146 lb (66 kg)	145 lb (66 kg)
Style	Orthodox	Orthodox
Recognition	WBA (Unified), WBC, The Ring and TBRB; Welterweight Champion; WBA (Super), WBC and TBRB; Super Welterweight Champion; The Ring No. 1 ranked pound-for-pound fighter 5-division world champion	WBA interim Welterweight Champion; Former two-time welterweight champion

Result
- Mayweather Jr. wins via 12-round unanimous decision (118-110, 117-111, 120-108)

Floyd Mayweather Jr. vs. Andre Berto, billed as High Stakes, was a professional boxing match contested on September 12, 2015, for the WBC, WBA and The Ring welterweight championship.

== Background ==
On August 4, 2015, it was announced that, after months of speculation, Floyd Mayweather Jr. would make the 5th defence of his welterweight championship against WBA interim champion Andre Berto on September 12, at the MGM Grand Garden Arena on Showtime PPV.

Mayweather Jr. confirmed that he would retire for the second time after the bout.

The announcement received some backlash due to Berto being (3–3) in his last 6 fights with many feeling that he wasn't a credible opponent. Former light welterweight champion Amir Khan was one of many to be disappointed with the selection. Berto believed Mayweather chose him as his final opponent for personal reasons, which could date back to when he won the National Golden Gloves tournament. Showtime's, Stephen Espinoza revealed the reason why Mayweather never chose Khan, was because he would have been observing Ramadan before the fight and therefore wouldn't be "at the top of his game". The reason to why he decided not to fight then IBF champion Kell Brook was a business decision, with Brook not being as well known in the U.S. compared to Berto.

BBC boxing commentator Mike Costello was among those criticizing the choice of Berto saying "Mayweather is almost immune to criticism, but he will need all his defensive guile to parry the brickbats heading his way. In opting to face Andre Berto he has taken some of the lustre off what he says will be his last appearance in the ring. Berto is a former world champion but now belongs at the bottom end of the world's top 20. Mayweather has spurned more dangerous opposition such as Amir Khan. It is all in a bid to finish with an unblemished record of 49 fights, but even his own father has been critical."

A week later Mayweather was stripped by The Ring of his light middleweight title due to his inactivity in the weight class.

The day before the bout, it emerged that Mayweather had broken Nevada State Athletic Commission rules before his victory over Manny Pacquiao in May, when he used a drip of saline and vitamins without approval. This followed reports that Mayweather had received favourable treatment from US Anti-Doping Agency, leading to calls for a rematch with AFP news agency quoted Pacquiao as saying "That is why I want a rematch, one without any injury and with fair play. No favouritism. Not one where the Mayweather camp gets to dictate all the terms and conditions. The Mayweather camp accused me of using performance-enhancing drugs. Now look what happened. The truth has finally came out and I was vindicated. If needed, the NSAC should impose the appropriate sanction to sustain its credibility and to show the world they did not give preferential treatment to the Mayweather camp."

== The fights ==
=== Undercard ===
The preliminary bouts saw wins for, among others Ashley Theophane, Gervonta Davis and Jonathan Oquendo.

=== Jack vs. Groves ===
High Stakes: Badou Jack vs. George Groves
- Title(s) on the line: WBC super middleweight title

Tale of the tape
Boxer	Badou Jack	George Groves
Nickname	"The Ripper"	"Saint"
Hometown	Stockholm, Södermanland, Sweden	Hammersmith, London, UK
Pre-fight record	19–1–1 (12 KO)	21–2 (16 KO)
Age	31 years, 10 months	27 years, 5 months
Height	6 ft 1 in (185 cm)	5 ft 11 1/2 in (182 cm)
Weight	167 1/2 lb (76 kg)	168 lb (76 kg)
Style	Orthodox	Orthodox
Recognition	WBC; Super Middleweight Champion; TBRB; No. 4 Ranked Super Middleweight; The Ring; No. 6 Ranked Super Middleweight	WBC; No. 1 Ranked Super Middleweight; The Ring/TBRB; No. 3 Ranked Super Middleweight

Result
- Jack defeats Groves by split decision

The first world title bout on the card saw WBC super middleweight champion Badou Jack face mandatory challenger George Groves in the first defence of the title he had won from Anthony Dirrell in April.

This was Groves' third world title challenge, having lost back to back challenges against Carl Froch in 2013 and 2014 respectively. On 21 July, the fight was pushed back from 22 August to instead take place on the undercard of Mayweather Berto.

For the second consecutive bout Jack was the underdog, as Groves was a 4/7 favourite to win. Jack however was unfazed by his status saying in a media call "I like it. I was the underdog before and changed the role as well. We saw what happened in there? It’s less pressure. So I like it."

Speaking before the bout a confident Groves said "People will consider this a 50-50 match up [against Jack]. We’re going to go in there and show people that they couldn’t be further from the truth. We’re in a great place and we’re just ready to perform, to steal the show and arrive on the world scene. So all the pressures and all the excitement and everything else that goes with fighting for the world championship, I don’t feel any of it because to me, it’s just a fight. We’re working hard. It’s been a lifelong dream to become world champion. We’re just concentrating on Badou Jack. This is a fight against a good guy, but a guy who is not as good as me. For that reason, we’re just looking forward to getting in there and performing. And winning and everything that goes with it."

==== The fight ====
In the opening round, after the two exchanged jab, Jack hurt Groves with a sharp right hand upstairs then landed an overhand right that send Groves down to the canvas. The 2nd round saw Jack regularly landing with a right hand over the top however Groves was able to land with several body shots. Groves continued to grow into the bout winning the 4th, 5th and 6th rounds all three scorecards as the technical jab contest gave way to in-fighting as he kept busy and kept Jack moving backward. Jack resumed his body attack in the 8th and would hurt Groves in the 9th with another overhand right. Groves would tire as Jack would control most of the championship rounds.

At the end the bout went the distance, the scorecards were split with 115–112 and 116–111 for Jack, and 114–113 for Groves. The Guardian scored it 115–112 for Jack.

According to CompuBox, Jack landed with 210 of 506 shots (41.5%), compared to just 154 of 721 for Groves (21.3%).

==== Aftermath ====
Groves felt as though he did enough to win and said, "I thought I won the fight decisively, all credit to him though scoring the knockdown in the first round, I thought I controlled the fight with my jab and that I was in control throughout it appeared closer to the judges." and "Losing a world title fight is the worst feeling in the world."

In October 2016, Jack would admit that Groves had been the toughest opponent he had faced in his career to that point.

Preceded by vs. Anthony Dirrell	Badou Jack's bouts 12 September 2015	Succeeded by vs. Lucian Bute
Preceded by vs. Denis Douglin	George Groves's bouts 12 September 2015	Succeeded by vs. Andrea Di Luisa

=== Martínez vs. Salido II ===
The chief support saw a rematch between Román Martínez and Orlando Salido for the WBO super featherweight title.

==== The fight ====
Martinez retained his world title by split decision draw with the three official judges scoring the bout (113-115, 115-113 & 114-114).

Preceded by First Bout	Román Martínez's bouts 12 September 2015	Succeeded by vs. Vasiliy Lomachenko
Preceded by First Bout	Orlando Salido's bouts 12 September 2015	Succeeded by vs. Francisco Vargas

=== Main Event ===
Mayweather was able to pinpoint holes in Berto's guard and find a home for the jab early. He landed sharp counters and feint hooks while controlling range for the vast majority of the bout. Berto pushed the pace, but his aggressiveness fell short as Mayweather was highly mobile and closed the distance consistently. Mayweather hurt his left hand at the end of the ninth round but remained comfortable throughout the rest of the fight.

Mayweather dominated the fight, landing an impressive 56% [232/410] punches thrown, and 67% of power punches [132/196] compared to Berto's underwhelming number of 16% [83/495] punches landed and 22% [39/177] of power punches thrown. Mayweather won the fight, 120-108, 118-110 and 117-111.

Keith Thurman complimented Mayweather for "Amazing speed ... he showed tremendous skill and talent."

Mayweather earned a purse of $32 million and Berto earned a career-high $4 million.

== Aftermath ==
Mayweather confirmed his retirement in the ring, and in November the WBC declared both his welterweight and super welterweight titles vacant. The latter of which Mayweather had failed to defend since September 2014 (and had not fought at the weight since September 2013).

This marked Mayweather 26th and final world title bout.

== Fight card ==
Confirmed bouts:

Weight Class		vs.		Method	Round	Time	Notes
Welterweight	(United States) Floyd Mayweather Jr. (c)	def.	(United States) Andre Berto	UD	12/12		^{Note 1}
Super Featherweight	(Puerto Rico) Román Martínez (c)	vs	(Mexico) Orlando Salido	SD	12/12		^{Note 2}
Super Middleweight	(Sweden) Badou Jack (c)	def.	(United Kingdom) George Groves	SD	12/12		^{Note 3}
Preliminary bouts
Super Featherweight	(Puerto Rico) Jonathan Oquendo	def.	(Mexico) Jhonny González	MD	10/10
Welterweight	(Uzbekistan) Sanjarbek Rakhmanov	def.	(Kyrgyzstan) Farkhad Sharipov	UD	6/6
Super Welterweight	(United States) Vanes Martirosyan	def.	(United States) Ishe Smith	MD	10/10
Middleweight	(United States) Chris Pearson	def.	(Canada) Janks Trotter	TKO	7/10
Lightweight	(United States) Gervonta Davis	def.	(Philippines) Recky Dulay	TKO	1/6
Super Middleweight	(Romania) Ronald Gavril	def.	(United States) Scott Sigmon	RTD	8/10
Welterweight	(United Kingdom) Ashley Theophane	def.	(United States) Steve Upsher Chambers	UD	10/10
Super Lightweight	(United States) Trakwon Pettis	def.	(United States) Devonte Seay	TKO	1/4

^Note 1 for WBA (Super), WBC, and The Ring welterweight titles
^Note 2 For WBO super featherweight title
^Note 3 For WBC super middleweight title

== Broadcasting ==
The telecast of the fight was televised via Showtime PPV, with its price set at US$64.99. For the first time in Showtime history, viewers were also able to purchase and watch the PPV online through the CBS website; those who purchase the fight online also received a free 3-month subscription to CBS All Access. The move to offer the fight online by official means was considered to be in response to the unauthorized redistribution of Mayweather vs. Pacquiao.

Estimates reported the number of PPV buys for the fight to be around 400,000, which was the lowest for a Mayweather fight in almost a decade.

Country	Broadcaster
Australia	Main Event
Hungary	Sport 1
Latin America	Canal Space
New Zealand	Sky Arena
Panama	RPC Televisión
United Kingdom	BoxNation
United States	Showtime

Preceded by vs. Manny Pacquiao	Floyd Mayweather Jr.'s bouts 12 September 2015	Succeeded by vs. Conor McGregor
Preceded by vs. Josesito López	Andre Berto's bouts 12 September 2015	Succeeded by vs. Victor Ortiz
