= Jan Zaveck vs. Andre Berto =

Boxing match

Battle In Biloxi
- Date: September 3, 2011
- Venue: Beau Rivage Resort & Casino, Biloxi, Mississippi, U.S.
- Title(s) on the line: IBF welterweight title

Tale of the tape
Boxer	(Slovenia) Jan Zaveck	(United States) Andre Berto
Nickname	"Mr. Sympathikus"	"The Beast"
Hometown	Ptuj, Styria, Slovenia	Miami, Florida, U.S.
Pre-fight record	31–1 (18 KO)	27–1 (21 KO)
Age	35 years, 5 months	27 years, 11 months
Height	5 ft 7 1/2 in (171 cm)	5 ft 8 1/2 in (174 cm)
Weight	146 1/2 lb (66 kg)	146 3/4 lb (67 kg)
Style	Orthodox	Orthodox
Recognition	IBF; Welterweight Champion; The Ring; No. 4 ranked welterweight	IBF; No. 9 ranked welterweight The Ring; No. 3 ranked welterweight Former WBC welterweight champion

Result
- Berto defeats Zaveck via 5th round RTD.

Jan Zaveck vs. Andre Berto was a professional boxing match contested on 3 September 2011, for the International Boxing Federation (IBF) welterweight title. The fight took place at the Beau Rivage Resort & Casino, in Biloxi, Mississippi, United States on 3 September 2011 and was televised via HBO's Boxing After Dark.

== Background ==
After discussions to fight Paulie Malignaggi on the Canelo Álvarez vs. Ryan Rhodes undercard fell through, Zaveck traveled to Biloxi, Mississippi to face Andre Berto who had just lost the WBC welterweight title to Victor Ortiz.

Zaveck expressed the hope that a victory in his US debut would boost his career saying that "A win over someone like Berto will elevate me to a whole new level. Just like everyone else, I want to fight Mayweather and [Manny] Pacquiao, and I see this fight as my golden opportunity to make that happen."

== The fight ==
Despite being a 4-to-1 underdog coming into the fight, Zaveck proved competitive; trading clean punches with Berto and earning praise from HBO's Roy Jones Jr. In the fifth round, a number of cuts opened on Zavec's face, which resulted in Zaveck's corner waiving the fight off before the sixth round.

== Aftermath ==
Berto thanked the Slovenian fans for traveling over to America to cheer their countryman on. He would call his performance "so-so", despite becoming a two-time welterweight champion.

Just over two months later he would vacate his IBF title rather than face mandatory challenger Randall Bailey in order to facilitate a rematch with Ortiz. However, after Berto tested positive for a banned substance, the rematch against Ortiz planned for June 23, 2012, was cancelled.

== Undercard ==
Confirmed bouts:

=== Televised ===
- WBC welterweight title bout: (Slovenia) Dejan Zaveck vs. (United States) Andre Berto

Berto defeats Zaveck via Technical Knockout (Retirement) at 3:00 of round five.

- Featherweight bout: (United States) Gary Russell Jr. vs. (Mexico) Leonilo Miranda

Russell Jr. defeats Miranda via Unanimous Decision. (80-72, 80-72, 79-72)

=== Preliminary card ===
- Super middleweight bout: (South Africa) Thomas Oosthuizen vs. (United States) Aaron Pryor Jr.

Oosthuizen defeats Pryor Jr. via Unanimous Decision. (117-111, 117-111, 117-111)

- Welterweight bout: (United States) Randall Bailey vs. (Dominican Republic) Yoryi Estrella

Bailey defeats Estrella via Unanimous Decision. (100-89, 100-89, 98-91)

- Featherweight bout: (Puerto Rico) Luis Del Valle vs. (Kenya) Anthony Napunyi

Del Valle defeats Napunyi via Technical Knockout at 1:21 of round three.

- Light welterweight bout: (Ukraine) Ivan Redkach vs. (United States) Vernon Alston

Redkach defeats Alston via Technical Knockout at 1:57 of round three.

- Light middleweight bout: (United States) Gerald Jordan vs. (Georgia (country)) Sergio Vartanov

Jordan defeats Vartanov via Split Decision. (59-54, 58-55, 56-58)

== Broadcasting ==
Country	Broadcaster
Hungary	Sport 2
Slovenia	TV Slovenia
Sweden	Viasat
United States	HBO

Preceded by vs. Paul Delgado	Jan Zaveck's bouts 3 September 2011	Succeeded by vs. Bethuel Ushona
Preceded by vs. Victor Ortiz	Andre Berto's bouts 3 September 2011	Succeeded by vs. Robert Guerrero
