= Andre Berto vs. Victor Ortiz =

Boxing competition

East-West Showdown
- Date: April 16, 2011
- Venue: Foxwoods Resort Casino, Mashantucket, Connecticut
- Title(s) on the line: WBC Welterweight Title

Tale of the tape
Boxer	(United States) Andre Berto	(United States) Victor Ortiz
Nickname	"The Beast"	"Vicious"
Hometown	Miami, Florida	Garden City, Kansas
Pre-fight record	27–0 (21 KO)	28–2–2 (22 KO)
Age	27 years, 7 months	24 years, 2 months
Height	5 ft 8 in (173 cm)	5 ft 9 in (175 cm)
Weight	145 1/2 lb (66 kg)	146 lb (66 kg)
Style	Orthodox	Orthodox
Recognition	WBC; Welterweight Champion; The Ring; No. 3 Ranked Welterweight	WBC; No. 8 Ranked Light Welterweight; The Ring; No. 9 Ranked Light Welterweight

Result
- Ortiz defeated Berto by unanimous decision

Andre Berto vs. Victor Ortiz was a professional boxing match contested on April 16, 2011, for the WBC Welterweight championship.

As part of an HBO World Championship Boxing broadcast, the split-site double-header included WBA junior welterweight Championship Amir Khan vs. Paul McCloskey, Khan fighting from his native England.

== Background ==
Berto came off a TKO victory over Freddy Hernandez. Berto successfully defended his WBC welterweight title, stopping Hernandez at 2:07 of the first round. He hammered Hernandez (29–2) with a left hook, then floored him with a straight right during the co-feature fight of the Juan Manuel Marquez-Michael Katsidis lightweight championship bout.

While Ortiz's last battle ended up being a draw against Lamont Peterson that could have delay that desire on the Amir Khan-Marcos Maidana junior welterweight title fight undercard. Peterson went down for the first time from a right hand that finished a four-punch combination. Peterson got up quickly and did not appear hurt. But he was moments later from another punch and he grabbed on to Ortiz as they tumbled to the mat. Both Andre Berto and Victor Ortiz were considered by some as two of the hottest prospects in any division.

Both rapper 50 Cent and #2 P4P boxer in the world Floyd Mayweather Jr. were sitting in ring side.

=== Negotiations ===
The fight was sanctioned as a world title fight in the welterweight division, where the weight limit is 147 pounds. However, Berto's camp agreed to fight at a catchweight of "145 pounds plus one" to accommodate Ortiz, who was moving up from the 140 lb division.

== The fight ==
Although Ortiz was the fighter moving up in weight, on fight night he was 161 on HBO's unofficial scale while Berto was 156. At Friday's weigh in, Ortiz weighed in at the contracted catchweight of 146 pounds, while Berto weighed 145.5. Ortiz outpointed Andre Berto to take Berto's welterweight title.

Ortiz took the fight to Berto (27–1, 21 KOs) from the beginning and almost never let up. Berto fired back throughout the fight but wasn't able to fully cope with the challenger's relentless pressure and hard, accurate punches. The knockdowns started almost immediately, Ortiz sending Berto down to one knee—and hurting him—with a combination in the first round. Berto returned the favor in the second with a right to the chin, forcing Ortiz to touch the canvas with his glove. Ortiz won the next three rounds by continuing to fire punches, many of which landed. Again, Berto punched back but couldn't keep pace. In the sixth round, Ortiz dropped his left hand and Berto landed a huge right about two minutes into the round, putting Ortiz on his back. Ortiz survived and put Berto down with a short left with a few seconds remaining in the round. Ortiz controlled the remainder of the fight as he had most of the first six rounds, pounding Berto inside with hard shots to the body and head as Berto failed to keep up.

== Aftermath ==
In April 2016, the pair had a rematch, with Berto reversing his loss to Ortiz by way of a fourth-round technical knockout win.

== Undercard ==
Confirmed bouts:

=== Televised ===
- Welterweight Championship bout: (United States) Andre Berto vs. (United States) Victor Ortiz
  - Ortiz defeated Berto by unanimous decision.(115–110, 114–112, 114–111)
- Light Middleweight bout: (United States) Deandre Latimore vs. (United States) Dennis Sharpe
  - Latimore defeated Sharpe by unanimous decision.(80–72, 80–72, 80–72)

=== Preliminary card ===
- Welterweight bout: (United States) Joseph Elegele vs. (United States) Angel Hernandez
  - Elegele defeated Hernandez by TKO of round 2.
- Welterweight bout: (Puerto Rico) Thomas Dulorme vs. (Dominican Republic) Harrison Cuello
  - Dulorme defeated Cuello by KO at 1:27 of round 2.
- Middleweight bout: (United States) J'Leon Love vs. (Guyana) JC Peterson
  - Love defeated Peterson by TKO of round 2.
- Bantamweight bout: (United States) Luis Rosa vs. (United States) Joseliz Cepeda
  - Rosa defeated Cepeda by TKO at 1:12 of round 5.
- Heavyweight bout: (United States) Sonya Lamonakis vs. (United States) Gigi Jackson
  - Lamonakis defeated Jackson by points.

== Broadcasting ==
Country	Broadcaster
United States	HBO

Preceded by vs. Freddy Hernández	Andre Berto's bouts 16 April 2011	Succeeded by vs. Jan Zaveck
Preceded by vs. Lamont Peterson	Victor Ortiz's bouts 16 April 2011	Succeeded by vs. Floyd Mayweather Jr.
Awards
Preceded by Giovani Segura vs. Ivan Calderon	The Ring Fight of the Year; 2011	Succeeded by Manny Pacquiao vs. Juan Manuel Márquez IV
