= Floyd Mayweather Jr. vs. Victor Ortiz =

Boxing match

Star Power
- Date: September 17, 2011
- Venue: MGM Grand Garden Arena, Paradise, Nevada, U.S.
- Title(s) on the line: WBC welterweight title

Tale of the tape
Boxer	Victor Ortiz	Floyd Mayweather Jr.
Nickname	Vicious	Money
Hometown	Oxnard, California, U.S.	Las Vegas, Nevada, U.S.
Purse	$2,000,000	$25,000,000
Pre-fight record	29–2–2 (22 KO)	41–0 (25 KO)
Age	24 years, 7 months	34 years, 6 months
Height	5 ft 9 in (175 cm)	5 ft 8 in (173 cm)
Weight	147 lb (67 kg)	146 1/2 lb (66 kg)
Style	Southpaw	Orthodox
Recognition	WBC; Welterweight Champion; The Ring; No. 2 Ranked Welterweight	WBC; No. 1 Ranked Welterweight; The Ring No. 2 ranked pound-for-pound fighter 5-division world champion

Result
- Mayweather Jr. wins via 4th-round KO

Floyd Mayweather Jr. vs. Victor Ortiz, billed as Star Power, was a professional boxing match contested on September 17, 2011, for the WBC welterweight championship.

== Background ==
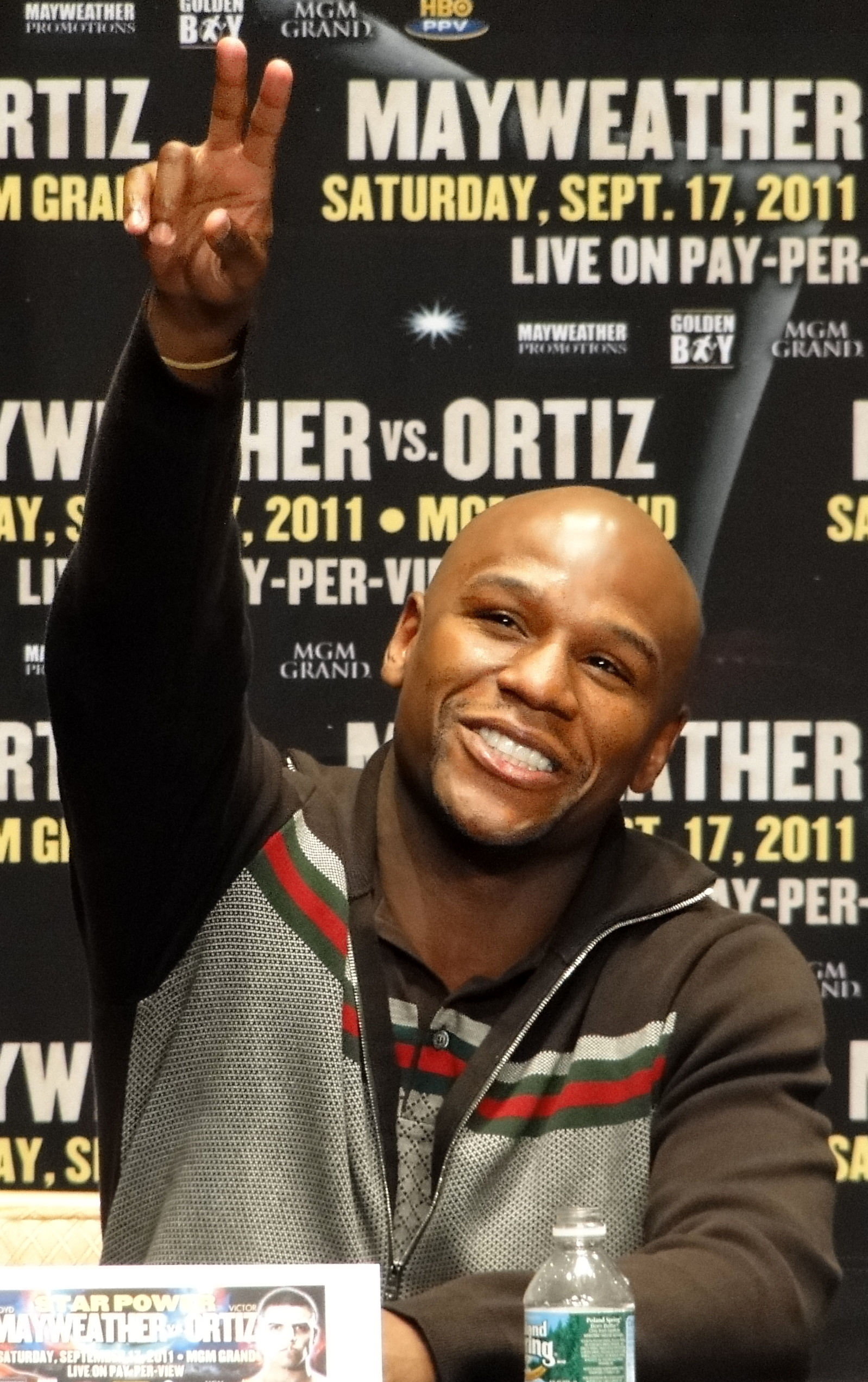
Mayweather photographed at the Mayweather–Ortiz press conference on June 28, 2011

Having defeated Andre Berto by unanimous decision in April 2011 to win the WBC welterweight title Victor Ortiz was linked to both a rematch with Berto and a rematch with former conqueror Marcos Maidana.

However, on June 7, Floyd Mayweather Jr. announced via Twitter that he was set to challenge Ortiz on September 17, ending a 16-month absence from the ring. This would be Mayweather's first world title bout since his victory over Ricky Hatton in 2007.

The bout was held at the MGM Grand in Paradise, Nevada, Nevada and televised via HBO PPV as part of a split-site doubleheader, the broadcast also featured the Canelo Álvarez vs. Alfonso Gómez light middleweight championship bout taking place at the Staples Center in Los Angeles, California.

== The fight ==
From round one, Mayweather used his speed, skills and accurate right hand to tag Ortiz repeatedly. Mayweather seemed in control through the first three rounds (judges scores: 30–27, 30–27, 29–28 for Mayweather), but in the fourth round, Ortiz found some success, landing a few shots and stinging Mayweather before backing him into the corner. Ortiz hit Mayweather in the face with an apparently intentional headbutt, busting open a cut on the inside and outside of Mayweather's mouth. Referee Joe Cortez immediately called timeout and penalised Ortiz a point for the foul. Ortiz, seemingly acknowledging his wrongdoing, hugged and kissed Mayweather in the corner. Cortez motioned the fighters back together to resume the fight. The fighters touched gloves and Mayweather seemed to half-heartedly return another hug from Ortiz. Then, with Cortez looking away from Mayweather, and as the fighters separated from the hug, Mayweather caught Ortiz with a left hook. Ortiz was stunned by the punch and, still not raising his hands to defend himself, was hit with a flush right to the face. Ortiz dropped straight onto the canvas and was unable to beat Cortez's count.

== Aftermath ==
"In the ring, you have to protect yourself at all times," Mayweather said. "After it happened, we touched gloves and we were back to fighting and then I threw the left hook and right hand after the break. You just gotta protect yourself at all times." After the interviewer Larry Merchant pressed Mayweather on whether or not what he did was unsportsmanlike, Mayweather told the interviewer he never gives him a fair shake and should be fired.

== Fight earnings ==
Mayweather was paid a guaranteed $25 million, which could have gone as high as $40 million depending on the pay per view numbers, and Ortiz was paid $2 million.

Mayweather vs. Victor Ortiz generated buys from 1.25 million homes with a value of $78,440,000 in pay-per-view revenue. These numbers make the event the third highest grossing non-heavyweight pay-per-view event of all time.

=== Main card ===
Confirmed bouts:

- Welterweight Championship bout (United States) Floyd Mayweather Jr. vs. (United States) Victor Ortiz
  - Mayweather defeats Ortiz via Knockout at 2:59 of the fourth round
- Light Welterweight Championship bout (Mexico) Erik Morales vs. (Mexico) Pablo César Cano
  - Morales defeats Cano via Technical Knockout at 3:00 of the tenth round.
- Light Welterweight bout (United States) Jessie Vargas vs. (United States) Josésito López
  - Vargas defeated López via Split Decision (95–94, 94–95, 96–93)

=== Preliminary card ===
- Welterweight bout (United States) Carson Jones vs (Morocco) Said Ouali
  - Jones defeats Ouali via Technical Knockout (Retirement) at 3:00 of the seventh round.
- Super Middleweight bout (Canada) Adonis Stevenson vs. (United States) Dion Savage
  - Stevenson defeats Savage via Technical Knockout at 1:57 of the first round.
- Super Middleweight bout (Mexico) Marco Antonio Periban vs. (United States) Dhafir Smith
  - Periban defeats Jones via Unanimous Decision. (80–72, 79–73, 79–73)
- Lightweight bout (United Kingdom) Anthony Crolla vs. (Mexico) Juan Montiel
  - Crolla defeats Montiel via Split Decision. (78–74, 77–75, 75–77)

== International broadcasting ==
Country	Broadcaster
Albania	SuperSport Albania
Argentina	TyC Sports
Australia	Main Event
Belgium	Be Sport 1
Cambodia	CTN
Czech Republic	Sport 1
Denmark	TV 2 Sport
France	Canal+ Sport
Hungary	Sport 1
Germany	Eurosport
Iceland	Stöð 2 Sport
Indonesia	tvOne
Italy	Sportitalia
Japan	WOWOW
Malaysia	Astro SuperSport
Mexico	Televisa
New Zealand	Sky
Norway	Viasat Sport
Philippines	Solar Sports/TV5/IBC-13
Poland	Polsat Sport
Portugal	Sport TV
Qatar	Al Jazeera Sports
Romania	Sport.ro
Russia	NTV Plus
Slovakia	Sport 1
Spain	Digital+
Sweden	TV10
South Africa	SuperSport
United Kingdom	Primetime
United States	HBO PPV
Venezuela	Meridiano

Preceded by vs. Andre Berto	Victor Ortiz's bouts 17 September 2011	Succeeded by vs. Josesito Lopez
Preceded by vs. Shane Mosley	Floyd Mayweather Jr.'s bouts 17 September 2011	Succeeded by vs. Miguel Cotto
