= Luis Collazo =

American boxer (born 1981)

Personal information
- Nickname: God's Way
- Nationality: American
- Born: April 22, 1981 (age 45) Brooklyn, New York City, New York, U.S.
- Height: 5 ft 9 in (175 cm)
- Weight: Welterweight

Boxing career
- Reach: 72 in (183 cm)
- Stance: Southpaw

Boxing record
- Total fights: 49
- Wins: 39
- Win by KO: 20
- Losses: 9
- No contests: 1

Luis Collazo (born April 22, 1981) is an American former professional boxer who held the WBA welterweight title from 2005 to 2006.

== Professional career ==
Collazo is of Puerto Rican descent, and grew up in Brooklyn, New York.

Collazo won the WBA Welterweight title on April 2, 2005, with a 12-round split decision victory over defending champion Jose Antonio Rivera. However, the WBA had elevated Cory Spinks to "Undisputed Champion" status before he had lost his titles to Zab Judah, so Collazo was not yet the definitive champion of that organization. On January 7, 2006, Judah lost a 12-round decision to Carlos Baldomir in New York. Baldomir had chosen to pay the sanctioning fee of the WBC only; as a result Judah's WBA undisputed title was vacated. With Judah's loss, Collazo then attained recognition as the WBA's sole welterweight champion. On May 13, 2006, he lost the title to Ricky Hatton in a very tight and controversial affair which went the distance.

On February 10, 2007, he lost a 12-round unanimous decision versus Sugar Shane Mosley in which he injured his hand early in the fight and continued on till the end. After working back from the injury through rehab and aggressive training, by long-time trainer Nirmal Lorick, Luis fought on the Roy Jones Jr. vs. Félix Trinidad card, January 19, 2008, at Madison Square Gardens. He won a one-sided victory against Edvan Dos Santos Barros (9-5-1, 7 KOs), winning 100-90 on 2 judges' scorecards and 99-91 on the other.

On September 28, 2008, on the Mosley vs. Mayorga undercard, Collazo stopped Russell Jordan (now 15-6) in the eighth and final round of their bout.

On January 17, 2009, Collazo fought the undefeated Andre Berto for the WBC Welterweight. Collazo lost a very close fight and a controversial unanimous decision after 12 rounds. Collazo appeared to be ahead most of the fight. The scores were 113-114, 113-114 and the third judge Bill Clancy scored the bout 111-116 which was found by some to be controversial.

On January 30, 2014, Collazo defeated Victor Ortiz in the first match up for Ortiz since his jaw was broken. Collazo landed a right hook to Ortiz in the last second of the second round which ended the match after the 10 count.

=== Collazo vs. Khan ===
Luis Collazo also faced Amir Khan in 2014, Khan dominated all rounds and scored three knockdowns during the fight.

=== Collazo vs. Vargas ===
On March 17, 2019, Collazo, ranked #10 by the WBO at welterweight, fought WBA's #10 Samuel Vargas. After a slow start, Collazo found his rhythm and outboxed Vargas enough to earn a split-decision victory, 98-92, 96-94 and 94-96.

=== Collazo vs. Abdukakhorov ===
In his next fight, Collazo fought Abdukakhorov, who was ranked #1 by the IBF, #5 by the WBC and #11 by the WBO at welterweight. The fight was competitive in the first half, but the younger, fresher Abdukakhorov prevailed in the second part of the fight. At 2:03 in the tenth round, Collazo was cut badly after a clash of heads and was not able to continue the fight. Abdukakhorov was awarded a technical decision victory.

== Professional boxing record ==
49 fights	39 wins	9 losses
By knockout	20	3
By decision	18	6
By disqualification	1	0
No contests	1	

No.	Result	Record	Opponent	Type	Round, time	Date	Location	Notes
49	Loss	39–9 (1)	Angel Ruiz Astorga	KO	6 (10), 2:26	Apr 19, 2023	Whitesands Events Center, Plant City, Florida, U.S.	
48	NC	39–8 (1)	Eimantas Stanionis	NC	4 (10), 2:44	Aug 7, 2021	Minneapolis Armory, Minneapolis, Minnesota, U.S.	
47	Loss	39–8	Kudratillo Abdukakhorov	TD	10 (10), 2:03	Oct 18, 2019	Liacouras Center, Philadelphia, Pennsylvania, U.S.	Unanimous TD after Collazo cut from accidental head clash
46	Win	39–7	Samuel Vargas	SD	10	Mar 17, 2019	Hulu Theater, New York City, New York, U.S.	
45	Win	38–7	Bryant Perrella	MD	10	Aug 4, 2018	Nassau Coliseum, Uniondale, New York, U.S.	
44	Win	37–7	Sammy Vasquez Jr.	KO	6 (10), 1:27	Feb 2, 2017	Horseshoe Casino, Tunica, Mississippi, U.S.	
43	Loss	36–7	Keith Thurman	RTD	7 (12), 3:00	Jul 11, 2015	USF Sun Dome, Tampa, Florida, U.S.	For WBA (Regular) welterweight title
42	Win	36–6	Chris Degollado	TKO	2 (8), 1:46	Apr 11, 2015	Barclays Center, New York City, New York, U.S.	
41	Loss	35–6	Amir Khan	UD	12	May 3, 2014	MGM Grand Garden Arena, Paradise, Nevada, U.S.	Lost WBA International welterweight title; For vacant WBC Silver welterweight title
40	Win	35–5	Victor Ortiz	KO	2 (12), 2:59	Jan 30, 2014	Barclays Center, New York City, New York, U.S.	Retained WBA International welterweight title
39	Win	34–5	Alan Sanchez	UD	10	Sep 2, 2013	Cowboys Dancehall, San Antonio, Texas, U.S.	Won vacant WBA International welterweight title
38	Win	33–5	Miguel Callist	TKO	5 (8), 1:33	Apr 27, 2013	Barclays Center, New York City, New York, U.S.	
37	Win	32–5	Steve Upsher Chambers	UD	8	Oct 20, 2012	Barclays Center, New York City, New York, U.S.	
36	Loss	31–5	Freddy Hernández	UD	10	Oct 15, 2011	Staples Center, Los Angeles, California, U.S.	
35	Win	31–4	Franklin Gonzalez	TKO	3 (8), 2:14	Apr 13, 2011	Oceana, New York City, New York, U.S.	
34	Win	30–4	David Gogichaishvili	TKO	6 (8), 2:56	Jun 20, 2009	Radisson Hotel, Columbia, South Carolina, U.S.	
33	Loss	29–4	Andre Berto	UD	12	Jan 17, 2009	Beau Rivage, Biloxi, Mississippi, U.S.	For WBC welterweight title
32	Win	29–3	Russell Jordan	TKO	8 (8), 2:28	Sep 27, 2008	Home Depot Center, Carson, California, U.S.	
31	Win	28–3	Edvan Dos Santos Barros	UD	10	Jan 19, 2008	Madison Square Garden, New York City, New York, U.S.	
30	Loss	27–3	Shane Mosley	UD	12	Feb 10, 2007	Mandalay Bay Events Center, Paradise, Nevada, U.S.	For WBC interim welterweight title
29	Win	27–2	Artur Atadzhanov	TKO	6 (10), 0:33	Nov 4, 2006	Chase Field, Phoenix, Arizona, U.S.	
28	Loss	26–2	Ricky Hatton	UD	12	May 13, 2006	TD Banknorth Garden, Boston, Massachusetts, U.S.	Lost WBA welterweight title
27	Win	26–1	Miguel Ángel González	RTD	7 (12), 3:00	Aug 13, 2005	United Center, Chicago, Illinois, U.S.	Retained WBA (Regular) welterweight title
26	Win	25–1	José Antonio Rivera	SD	12	Apr 2, 2005	DCU Center, Worcester, Massachusetts, U.S.	Won WBA (Regular) welterweight title
25	Win	24–1	Richard Heath	TKO	1 (6), 2:15	Feb 24, 2005	The Plex, North Charleston, South Carolina, U.S.	
24	Win	23–1	Kevin Carter	TKO	6 (8), 2:46	Jan 28, 2005	The Plex, North Charleston, South Carolina, U.S.	
23	Win	22–1	Felix Flores	UD	10	Oct 2, 2004	Madison Square Garden, New York City, New York, U.S.	
22	Win	21–1	Thomas Davis	UD	6	Apr 17, 2004	Madison Square Garden, New York City, New York, U.S.	
21	Win	20–1	Earl Allen	TKO	4 (8), 2:10	Mar 27, 2003	War Memorial Auditorium, Fort Lauderdale, Florida, U.S.	
20	Win	19–1	Marcos Primera	UD	8	Jan 16, 2003	Michael's Eighth Avenue, Glen Burnie, Maryland, U.S.	
19	Win	18–1	Jose Avila	UD	6	Nov 8, 2002	Club Amazura, New York City, New York, U.S.	
18	Win	17–1	Vincent Harris	UD	6	Aug 30, 2002	Harry Cipriani Restaurant, New York City, New York, U.S	
17	Win	16–1	Gary Grant	UD	4	Jun 22, 2002	Sovereign Center, Reading, Pennsylvania, U.S.	
16	Win	15–1	George Ray	TKO	2	May 31, 2002	Boutwell Memorial Auditorium, Birmingham, Alabama, U.S.	
15	Loss	14–1	Edwin Cassiani	TKO	3 (10), 1:41	Apr 13, 2002	Fremont Street Experience, Las Vegas, Nevada, U.S.	
14	Win	14–0	Orlando Milian	TKO	4 (8)	Jan 18, 2002	Hilton Hotel, Huntington, New York, U.S.	
13	Win	13–0	Luis Alberto Santiago	UD	8	Aug 4, 2001	United Palace, New York City, New York, U.S.	
12	Win	12–0	Kareem Braithwaite	TKO	1	Jul 7, 2001	KeySpan Park, New York City, New York, U.S.	
11	Win	11–0	Philip Thrasher	UD	6	Jun 22, 2001	Zembo Shrine Building, Harrisburg, Pennsylvania, U.S.	
10	Win	10–0	Gary Grant	TKO	3	Jun 9, 2001	Club Amazura, New York City, New York, U.S.	
9	Win	9–0	Matt Hill	UD	6	Apr 29, 2001	Club Amazura, New York City, New York, U.S.	
8	Win	8–0	Terry Dominic	UD	4	Apr 24, 2001	Civic Center, Houma, Louisiana, U.S.	
7	Win	7–0	George Best	TKO	2 (6), 1:11	Apr 1, 2001	Club Amazura, New York City, New York, U.S.	
6	Win	6–0	Sylvester Clark	PTS	4	Feb 24, 2001	Golden Gloves Arena, Knoxville, Tennessee, U.S.	
5	Win	5–0	Sean Thomassen	TKO	2	Dec 8, 2000	Club Amazura, New York City, New York, U.S.	
4	Win	4–0	Rohan Nanton	UD	6	Oct 11, 2000	Raceway, Yonkers, New York, U.S.	
3	Win	3–0	Derek Hudson	DQ	3 (6)	Jul 28, 2000	Club Amazura, New York City, New York, U.S.	
2	Win	2–0	Darnell Green	TKO	6 (6)	Jun 7, 2000	Raceway, Yonkers, New York, U.S.	
1	Win	1–0	Jose Maldonado	TKO	1 (4)	May 17, 2000	Raceway, Yonkers, New York, U.S.	

== See also ==
- List of Puerto Rican boxing world champions

Sporting positions
Regional boxing titles
Vacant Title last held by Johan Pérez	WBA International welterweight champion September 2, 2013 – May 3, 2014	Succeeded by Amir Khan
World boxing titles
Preceded by José Antonio Rivera	WBA welterweight champion Regular title April 2, 2005 – January 7, 2006; Status changed	Vacant Title next held by Yuriy Nuzhnenko
Preceded by Zab Judah	WBA welterweight champion January 7, 2006 – May 13, 2006	Succeeded by Ricky Hatton
