= Shane Mosley vs. Sergio Mora =

Boxing match

200: Celebrate and Dominate
- Date: September 18, 2010
- Venue: Staples Center, Los Angeles, California, U.S.

Tale of the tape
Boxer	Shane Mosley	Sergio Mora
Nickname	Sugar	The Latin Snake
Hometown	Pomona, California, U.S.	East Los Angeles, California, U.S.
Purse	$1,000,000	$285,000
Pre-fight record	46–6 (39 KO)	22–1–1 (6 KO)
Age	39 years	29 years, 9 months
Height	5 ft 9 in (175 cm)	6 ft 0 in (183 cm)
Weight	154 lb (70 kg)	157 lb (71 kg)
Style	Orthodox	Orthodox
Recognition	WBC; No. 5 Ranked Super Welterweight; The Ring; No. 4 Ranked Welterweight; The Ring No. 5 ranked pound-for-pound fighter 3-division world champion	WBC; No. 8 Ranked Super Welterweight; Former Light middleweight champion

Result
- Split Draw

Shane Mosley vs. Sergio Mora, billed as 200: Celebrate and Dominate, was a professional boxing match contested on September 18, 2010.

== Background ==
On 30 June 2010, it was announced Shane Mosley would fight former WBC light middleweight champion Sergio Mora at the Staples Center in Los Angeles on September 18 at light middleweight, only a few months after his wide decision loss to Floyd Mayweather Jr. An official press conference took place at the end of August. The card was billed as a celebration of the bicentennial of Mexican Independence Day.

Mora would weight in at 157 lbs, three pounds over the light middleweight division limit, so as a result he was forced to give 20% of his purse to Mosley.

== The fights ==
=== Undercard ===
The first of the televised bouts saw former WBO super bantamweight champion Daniel Ponce de León stop Antonio Escalante by 3rd-round knockout in a WBO featherweight title eliminator. This was followed by Victor Ortiz also scoring a 3rd-round knockout, over former WBA light welterweight champion Vivian Harris.

=== Álvarez vs. Baldomir ===
In the chief support undefeated contender Canelo Álvarez faced former welterweight champion Carlos Baldomir. Baldomir was knocked down by a left hook in the closing seconds of the sixth round, falling face first onto the canvass. He was counted out by the referee giving him his first stoppage loss in 16 years.

Speaking afterwards Baldomir said "It's true that he hits hard. He hits really hard. His power really surprised me. This kid is the real deal. And he's going to be a champion. No one has hit me like he hit me before. He knocked me out me and nobody (except one man) has ever knocked me out."

Preceded by vs. Luciano Leonel Cuello	Canelo Álvarez's bouts 18 September 2010	Succeeded by vs. Lovemore N'dou
Preceded by vs. Jairo Jesus Siris	Carlos Baldomir's bouts 18 September 2010	Succeeded by vs. Amilcar Funes Melian

=== Main Event ===
Mosley was the aggressor through much of the bout but had trouble landing clean punches with Mora moving out of harm's way or tying Mosley up when he got inside. The lack of the action resulted in crowd booing from as early as the second round.

The bout ended up being a scored a split draw with one judge having it 115–113 for Mora, one for Mosley 116–112 and the other 114–114. The scores from the journalists at ringside ranged from a six-point victory for Mosley to a four-point win for Mora. Both HBO's Harold Lederman and ESPN scored the bout 117–111 for Mosley.

According to CompuBox Mosley landed 31% (161 of 522) of his punches, compared to just 18% (93 of 508) landed by Mora.

== Aftermath ==
Mosley appeared to be satisfied with the result saying "We both fought hard, it was good fight, a good decision." Mora meanwhile felt had done enough to pull off the upset "I should've listened to my corner, they were telling me that it was a close fight. I thought I was winning, so I didn't fight as hard because I have respect for Shane. I didn't want to hurt him."

== Undercard ==
Confirmed bouts:

Winner	Loser	Weight division/title belt(s) disputed	Result
(Mexico) Canelo Álvarez	(Argentina) Carlos Baldomir	WBC Silver Super Welterweight	6th-round KO.
(United States) Victor Ortiz	(Guyana) Vivian Harris	Welterweight (10 rounds)	3rd-round KO.
(Mexico) Daniel Ponce de León	(Mexico) Antonio Escalante	WBO World Featherweight title eliminator	3rd-round KO.
Non-TV bouts
(United States) Kaliesha West	(United States) Angel Gladney	WBO World Bantamweight title	7th-round KO.
(United States) David Rodela	(Mexico) Juan Montiel	Lightweight (6 rounds)	Majority Draw
(United States) Keith Thurman	(United States) Quandray Robertson	Light Middleweight (6 rounds)	3rd-round KO.
(Uganda) Sharif Bogere	(Mexico) Julian Rodriguez	Super lightweight (6 rounds)	2nd-round KO.
(Mexico) Frankie Gómez	(Mexico) Ricardo Calzada	Welterweight (6 rounds)	3rd-round KO.
(Mexico) Mikayl Arreola	(Mexico) Missael Nunez	Featherweight (4 rounds)	Majority Decision

== Broadcasting ==
Country	Broadcaster
Australia	Main Event
Hungary	Sport 1
Poland	Polsat
United States	HBO

Preceded by vs. Floyd Mayweather Jr.	Shane Mosley's bouts 18 September 2010	Succeeded by vs. Manny Pacquiao
Preceded by vs. Calvin Green	Sergio Mora's bouts 18 September 2010	Succeeded by vs. Brian Vera
