= Shane Mosley vs. Luis Collazo =

Boxing match

Battle at the Bay
- Date: February 10, 2007
- Venue: Mandalay Bay Events Center, Paradise, Nevada, U.S.
- Title(s) on the line: WBC "interim" welterweight title

Tale of the tape
Boxer	Shane Mosley	Luis Collazo
Nickname	Sugar	God's Way
Hometown	Pomona, California, U.S.	Brooklyn, New York, U.S.
Purse	$1,000,000	
Pre-fight record	43–4 (1) (37 KO)	27–2 (13 KO)
Age	35 years, 5 months	25 years, 9 months
Height	5 ft 9 in (175 cm)	5 ft 9 in (175 cm)
Weight	147 lb (67 kg)	147 lb (67 kg)
Style	Orthodox	Southpaw
Recognition	WBC; No. 1 Ranked Welterweight; WBO; No. 2 Ranked Welterweight; WBA/IBF; No. 2 Ranked Light Middleweight; The Ring; No. 1 Ranked Light Middleweight; 3-division world champion	WBA; No. 1 Ranked Welterweight; WBC/WBO; No. 3 Ranked Welterweight; IBF; No. 9 Ranked Welterweight; The Ring; No. 5 Ranked Welterweight; Former WBA welterweight champion

Result
- Mosley wins via 12–round unanimous decision (119–108, 118–109, 118–109)

Shane Mosley vs. Luis Collazo, billed as the Battle at the Bay, was a professional boxing match contested on February 10, 2007 for the WBC interim welterweight title.

== Background ==
It was announced in late December 2006 that three-division world champion Shane Mosley would be leaving the light middleweight division, which he had competed in for the majority of the previous four years, to return to the welterweight division to challenge Kermit Cintrón for the IBF welterweight title. The fight was scheduled for February 10, 2007, and was to be Cintrón's first defense of the IBF welterweight title that he had won in October 2006 after besting Mark Suárez.

However, just days after the announcement, Cintrón, who had agreed to fight but not officially signed a contract, pulled out of the bout, citing issues with his promoter Bobby Bostick, who had offered to give Cintrón just $250,000 of the $750,000 purse offered by Golden Boy Promotions, who promoted Mosely. This led to Golden Boy Promotions quickly pivoting and reaching a deal with former World Boxing Association welterweight champion Luis Collazo and his promoter Don King. The fight would held for the WBC interim welterweight title as the regular title holder, Floyd Mayweather Jr., was moving up to light middleweight to face Oscar De La Hoya in May and this would be unable to defend the belt for most of the year.

== Fight Details ==
Mosley would score an extremely lopsided victory, winning all but two rounds (118–109) on two of the judge's scorecards and all but one on the third (119–108). Mosley would punctuate his victory at the end of the fight during the penultimate eleventh round, scoring the lone knockdown as he sent an off-balance Collazo on the seat of his pants with a right hand to the head during the closing seconds of the round. Collazo admitted that he injured his left hand early in the third round which hampered the southpaw for the remainder of the fight, who only landed 14% of his thrown punches, landing just 87 of 639. Mosley, meanwhile, landed 200 punches during the bout, more than double the amount of punches landed by Collazo.

== Fight card ==
Confirmed bouts:

Weight Class	Weight		vs.		Method	Round	Notes
Welterweight	147 lbs.	Shane Mosley	def.	Luis Collazo	UD	12	^{note 1}
Super Lightweight	140 lbs.	Vivian Harris	def.	Juan Lazcano	UD	12	^{note 2}
Super Featherweight	130 lbs.	Billy Dib	def.	Carlos Contreras	UD	10
Light Middleweight	154 lbs.	Jose Angel Rodriguez	def.	Cesar Valentin	TKO	3/6
Super Middleweight	168 lbs.	Craig McEwan	def.	Isidro Arreola	TKO	4/4
Welterweight	147 lbs.	Leon Green	def.	Bryan Mullis	UD	4

^Note 1 For WBC Interim Welterweight Title
^Note 2 WBC Super Lightweight Title Eliminator

== Broadcasting ==
Country	Broadcaster
United States	HBO

Preceded by vs. Fernando Vargas II	Shane Mosley's bouts 10 February 2007	Succeeded by vs. Miguel Cotto
Preceded by vs. Artur Atadzhanov	Luis Collazo's bouts 10 February 2007	Succeeded by vs. Edvan Dos Santos Barros
