= Freddy Hernández =

Mexican boxer

Freddy Hernandez
Personal information
- Nickname: El Riel
- Born: Freddy Hernández Gómez; 23 March 1979 (age 47) Mexico City, Mexico
- Height: 1.82 m (6 ft 0 in)
- Weight: Light welterweight Welterweight; Light middleweight

Boxing career
- Reach: 189 cm (74 in)
- Stance: Orthodox

Boxing record
- Total fights: 46
- Wins: 34
- Win by KO: 22
- Losses: 11
- Draws: 0
- No contests: 1

Freddy Hernández Gómez (born 23 March 1979) is a Mexican professional boxer who challenged for the WBC welterweight title in 2010.

== Professional career ==
Hernández beat Damian Frias (16-1) in a one-sided 10-round decision to win the WBC Latino welterweight title. On February 2, 2010 he knocked out DeMarcus Corley in the fifth round to defend his WBC Latino welterweight title.

=== Hernandez vs. Berto ===
On November 27, 2010 Hernández lost against Andre Berto for the WBC welterweight title.

=== Hernandez vs. Angulo ===
On August 27, 2016, Hernandez fought Alfredo Angulo. Hernandez won the fight via unanimous decision, 98-92, 97-93 and 97-93.

=== Hernandez vs. Bohachuk ===
On May 19, 2019, Hernandez fought Serhii Bohachuk. Bohachuk was ranked #8 by the IBF and #13 by the WBC at super welterweight. Bohachuk defeated Hernandez via a fifth round knockout.

== Professional boxing record ==
46 fights	34 wins	11 losses
By knockout	22	5
By decision	12	6
No contests	1	

Result	Record	Opponent	Type	Round, time	Date	Location	Notes
Loss	34-11; 1 NC	(Ukraine) Serhii Bohachuk	KO	5 (8)	May 19, 2019	(United States) The Avalon, Hollywood, California, US	
Loss	34-10; 1 NC	(Republic of Ireland) Jason Quigley	UD	10	October 15, 2018	(United States) Fantasy Springs Casino, Indio, California, US	
Loss	34-9; 1 NC	(Nigeria) Wale Omotoso	UD	10	December 15, 2017	(United States) Pioneer Event Center, Lancaster	
Win	34-8; 1 NC	(Mexico) Alfredo Angulo	UD	10	August 27, 2016	(United States) Honda Center, Anaheim	
Win	33-8; 1 NC	(United States) Todd Manuel	MD	8	August 27, 2015	(United States) The Hangar, Costa Mesa	
Win	32-8; 1 NC	(Mexico) Jorge Juarez	TKO	1 (6), 2:51	May 22, 2015	(Mexico) Gimnasio De Mexicali, Mexicali, Baja California	
Win	31-8; 1 NC	(Mexico) Jorge Juarez	TKO	2 (10), 2:23	March 6, 2015	(Mexico) Gimnasio De Mexicali, Mexicali, Baja California	
Loss	30-8; 1 NC	(United States) Brad Solomon	TKO	6 (10), 1:36	September 6, 2014	(United States) Laredo Energy Arena, Laredo, Texas	
Loss	30-7; 1 NC	(United States) Julian Williams	KO	3 (10), 0:35	March 17, 2014	(United States) House of Blues, Boston, Massachusetts	
Loss	30-6; 1 NC	(United States) Francisco Santana	UD	10	August 16, 2013	(United States) Chumash Casino, Santa Ynez, California	
Loss	30-5; 1 NC	(Dominican Republic) Delvin Rodríguez	TKO	8 (10), 1:37	May 24, 2013	(United States) Mohegan Sun Casino, Uncasville, Connecticut	For vacant IBF North American light middleweight title
Loss	30-4; 1 NC	(United States) Demetrius Andrade	UD	10	January 25, 2013	(United States) Paramount Theatre, Huntington, New York	
Loss	30-3; 1 NC	(Cuba) Erislandy Lara	UD	10	June 30, 2012	(United States) Fantasy Springs Resort Casino, Indio, California	
Win	30-2; 1 NC	(United States) Luis Collazo	UD	10	October 15, 2011	(United States) Staples Center, Los Angeles, California	
Loss	29-2; 1 NC	(United States) Andre Berto	TKO	1 (12), (2:07)	November 27, 2010	(United States) MGM Grand Arena, Las Vegas, Nevada	For WBC welterweight title
Win	29-1; 1 NC	(United States) Mike Anchondo	TKO	4 (10), (1:38)	September 17, 2010	(United States) Buffalo Bill's Star Arena, Primm, Nevada	Retained WBC Latino welterweight title
Win	28-1; 1 NC	(United States) DeMarcus Corley	KO	5 (10), (1:48)	February 5, 2010	(United States) Chumash Casino, Santa Ynez, California	
Win	27-1; 1 NC	(Nicaragua) Octavio Narvaez	UD	8	December 12, 2009	(United States) Agua Caliente Casino, Rancho Mirage, California	
Win	26-1; 1 NC	(Cuba) Damian Frias	UD	10	October 23, 2009	(United States) Laredo Entertainment Center, Laredo, Texas	Won WBC Latino welterweight title
Win	25-1; 1 NC	(Cuba) Hicklet Lau	UD	8	July 31, 2009	(United States) Pechanga Resort & Casino, Temecula, California	
Win	24-1; 1 NC	(United States) Norberto Bravo	UD	12	April 18, 2008	(United States) Casino Del Sol, Tucson, Arizona	Won IBA welterweight title
NC	23-1; 1 NC	(Mexico) Roberto Garcia	NC	3 (12), (0:57)	November 30, 2007	(United States) Jacob Brown Auditorium, Brownsville, Texas	For vacant IBA welterweight title
Win	23-1	(Mexico) Roberto Valenzuela	TKO	3 (10), (0:18)	August 31, 2007	(United States) Casino Del Sol, Tucson, Arizona	
Win	22-1	(Ghana) Ben Tackie	UD	10	June 1, 2007	(United States) Cicero Stadium, Cicero, Illinois	
