= Andre Berto =

American boxer (born 1983)

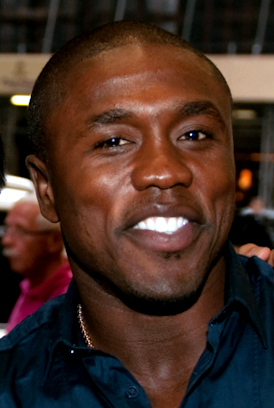
- Berto in 2010

Personal information
- Nickname: The Beast
- Nationality: American (jus solis) Haitian (jus sanguinis)
- Born: Andre Michael Berto; September 7, 1983 (age 43) Winter Haven, Florida, U.S.
- Height: 5 ft 6 1/2 in (169 cm)
- Weight: Welterweight

Boxing career
- Reach: 68 1/2 in (174 cm)
- Stance: Orthodox

Boxing record
- Total fights: 38
- Wins: 32
- Win by KO: 24
- Losses: 6
Medal record
Men's amateur boxing
Representing United States
World Championships
Bronze medal – third place	2003 Bangkok	Welterweight

Andre Michael Berto (born September 7, 1983) is a professional boxer who holds dual Haitian and American citizenship. A two-time former welterweight world champion, he held the WBC and IBF titles between 2008 and 2011, and the WBA interim title in 2015. As an amateur, he won the National Golden Gloves tournament in 2001 (at light middleweight) and 2003 (welterweight), and would represent the U.S. at the 2003 World Championships, winning a welterweight bronze medal. He also represented Haiti at the 2004 Olympics, reaching the opening round of the welterweight bracket.

Throughout his career, Berto was known for his toughness, formidable punching power, and fast hand speed. In the late 2000s he was considered a rising star in the welterweight division, as well as a highly regarded young prospect in boxing. He reached the peak of his career in 2011, holding the WBC welterweight title which he had won in 2008 and made five defenses, and was ranked as the world's third best welterweight, behind then-top stars Manny Pacquiao and Floyd Mayweather Jr.

Berto's success was cut short after his first career loss to Victor Ortiz in 2011, which won Fight of the Year honors by The Ring magazine. Afterwards, Berto's career fluctuated: from 2012 to 2015 he lost a further three times, but bounced back in 2016 with a win over Ortiz in a rematch.

== Early life ==
The son of Haitian immigrants, Berto was one of seven children born and raised in Winter Haven, Florida. Multiple members of the Berto family would become involved in combat sports. Andre's sister Revelina and brother James are both professional mixed martial artists. Their father Dieuseul is a retired professional kickboxer who competed at UFC 10. Andre was introduced to boxing by his father after getting beat up multiple times by classmates. Dieuseul taught the sport to Berto at his own school in Winter Haven called Tiger's World. For Berto, the sport of boxing became a solace to stay out of trouble in the rough community in which he grew up.

== Amateur career ==
As an amateur, Berto won a bronze medal in the 2003 World championships. He was also a two-time U.S. National Golden Gloves champion, a two-time National PAL champion, a three-time U.S. amateur championship medalist, and won 22 state titles in Florida. Prior to the 2003 World championships, Berto defeated future world title challenger Andre Dirrell, and future three-weight world champion Timothy Bradley twice.

=== 2004 Olympics ===
Berto was an odds-on favorite to breeze through the 2004 Olympic Trials and qualify as a member of the US Olympic boxing squad. Those dreams were dashed in the opening round of the trials, when he was disqualified for throwing Juan McPherson to the canvas. Berto was winning the fight, before McPherson bumped into him before being pushed to the canvas, and was deemed in no condition to continue. The act was ruled a flagrant foul, and Berto was disqualified. A protest was ruled in his favor, as he was declared the winner and advanced to the next round. Berto won that bout as well and prepared for the finals before a follow-up meeting the night before reverted to the initial ruling, eliminating Berto from the tournament. Because his parents emigrated from Haiti, Berto was able to keep his Olympic hopes alive, qualifying for Team Haiti, and subsequently granted Haitian citizenship alongside his American nationality, an exception the island country awarded the Olympian. Berto lost in the first-round to Xavier Noel of France.

== Professional career ==
=== Early career ===
From December 2004 to October 2006, Berto won 15 fights, with 13 coming by way of knockout. On December 12, 2006, at the Alltel Arena in North Little Rock, Arkansas, Berto stepped up in competition and fought Miguel Figueroa. Berto put together a one-sided destruction of Figueroa, eventually forcing the referee to stop the fight in round six. He was named ESPN.com's 2006 Prospect of the Year. His next fight took place on February 17, 2007, at the Hammerstein Ballroom in New York City, against Norberto Bravo of The Contender. Berto defeated Bravo by first-round technical knockout after Bravo was knocked down three times, triggering the three knockdown rule. On May 19, 2007, Berto defeated Martinus Clay by seventh-round technical knockout.

On July 27, 2007, at the City Center in Saratoga Springs, New York. Berto fought Cosme Rivera. Berto was in full control until he was down for the first time in his career in round six. He was able to recover and open up a bad cut over Rivera's right eye in the seventh round. Rivera stood his ground in the remaining rounds to test Berto, but Berto won by unanimous decision. On September 29, 2007, at Boardwalk Hall in Atlantic City, New Jersey, Berto defeated David Estrada by eleventh-round technical knockout to win the NABF welterweight title. Rounds three and eight were described by BoxingScene.com as "round of the year" candidates as both men went toe-to-toe with flush power shots. The end came when Berto dropped Estrada with an uppercut that was followed up by a huge right hand. Estrada made it to his feet, but could not defend himself as Berto attacked with more damaging shots that prompted the referee to jump in and stop the fight.

On February 9, 2008, at the Pechanga Resort & Casino in Temecula, California, Berto fought Michael Trabant in his first defense of the NABF welterweight title. Trabant stayed on the defensive for the entire fight with Berto landing a variety of punches from all angles. In the fifth and sixth rounds, Trabant was barely able to land a single punch, as he was frequently taking punches to the head. Trabant told the referee after round six that he was no longer willing to continue with the fight. It was the first time that Trabant had ever been stopped.

=== WBC welterweight champion ===
==== Berto vs. Rodriguez ====
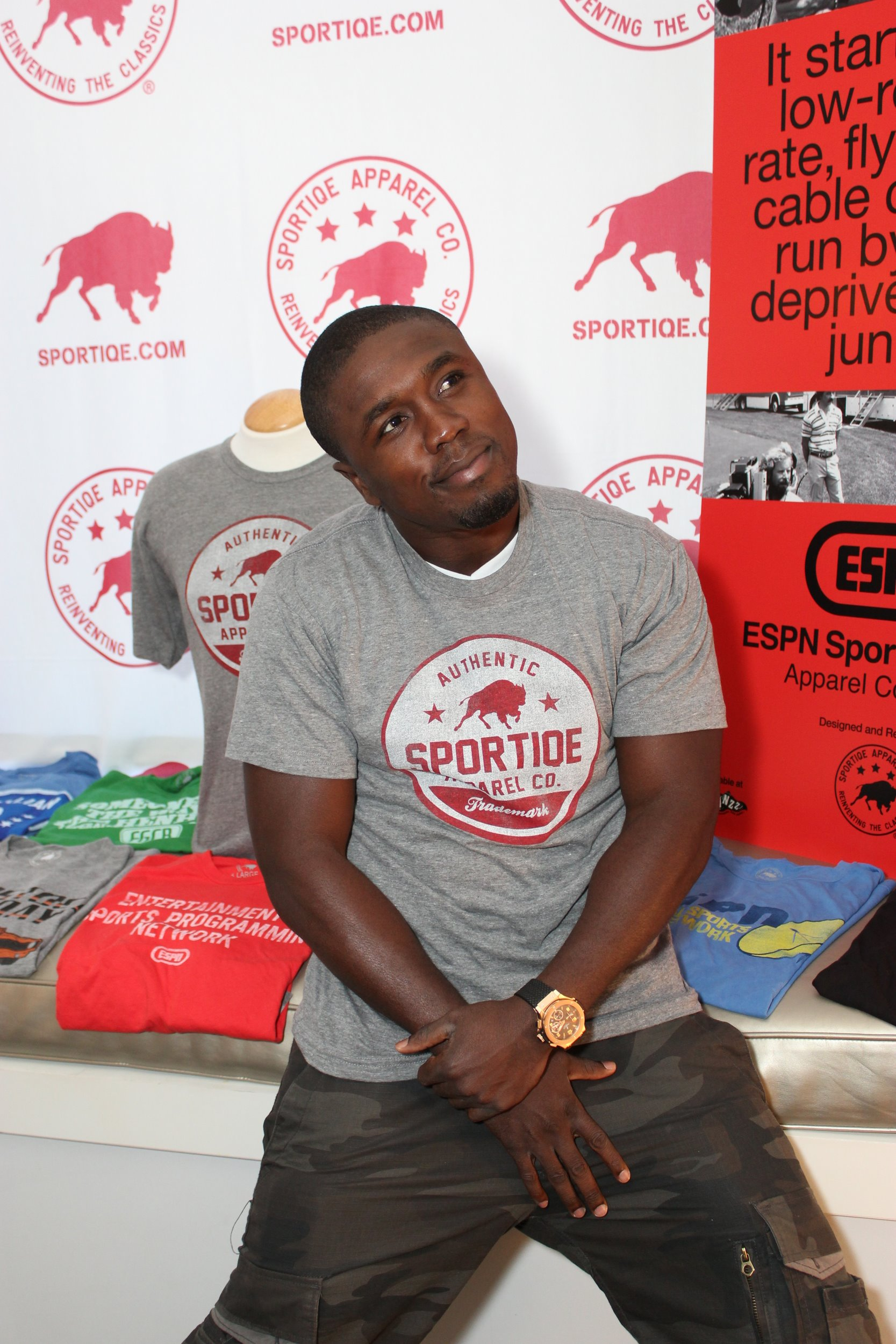
Berto in 2011

On June 21, 2008, Berto captured the vacant WBC welterweight title left vacant by Floyd Mayweather Jr. defeating Miguel Rodriguez in the seventh round by technical knockout at the FedEx Forum in Memphis, Tennessee. Berto knocked Rodriguez down twice in the seventh round, before the referee stopped the bout with 47 seconds left as Berto continually hurt Rodriguez with right hands.

==== Berto vs. Forbes, Collazo ====
Berto's first title defense of the WBC welterweight title occurred on September 28, 2008, at the Home Depot Center in Carson, California, against Steve Forbes. Berto consistently outpunched Forbes throughout winning the fight by unanimous decision with scores of 118–109 on two of the scorecards and 116–111 on the third scorecard.

Berto made the second defense of his title on January 17, 2009, at the Beau Rivage in Biloxi, Mississippi, against former WBA welterweight champion Luis Collazo. Berto got off to a rough start as he was hurt in the first round and had a point deducted in the fourth round for holding Collazo's arm. In round seven, Berto opened a cut over the left eye of Collazo. Berto won the fight by a controversial unanimous decision with scores of 114–113 on two of the scorecards and 116–111 on the third scorecard in a fight which most thought Collazo might have won.

==== Berto vs. Urango, Quintana ====
On Saturday, May 30, 2009, Berto defended his WBC welterweight title against former IBF light welterweight champion Juan Urango and won a lopsided unanimous decision setting up a fight with Shane Mosley.

Berto was to defend his title against "Sugar" Shane Mosley for a WBC, WBA welterweight title unification bout on January 30, 2010. However, Berto announced that he was withdrawing from his title unification bout against Mosley on January 18, 2010, due to family loss in the Haiti earthquake. With Mosley subsequently landing a bout with Floyd Mayweather Jr., Berto faced former WBO welterweight champion Carlos Quintana on April 10, 2010, in the beginning Quintana outboxed Berto but eventually Berto's speed and power began to overwhelm Quintana and eventually won by an eighth round Technical knockout, despite injuring his left bicep during the fight.

==== Berto vs. Hernandez, Ortiz ====
On November 27, 2010, Berto scored a TKO victory over Freddy Hernández. Berto successfully defended his WBC welterweight title, stopping an overmatched Freddy Hernandez at 2:07 of the first round putting himself in line for a shot at Floyd Mayweather Jr. He hammered Hernandez with a left hook, then floored him with a straight right during the co-feature fight of the Juan Manuel Márquez-Michael Katsidis lightweight championship bout.

On April 16, 2011, Berto's reign as WBC welterweight champion came to an abrupt end in a fight which proved to be one of the biggest upsets of 2011 at the hands of a moving up in weight form 140 "Vicious" Victor Ortíz. Ortiz defeated Berto by unanimous decision in a fight that was named The Ring magazine's "Fight of the Year" for 2011 with 4 ruled knockdowns going into the fight Berto was undefeated but was facing complaints of being unproven at the highest level and a lack of notable, quality opposition on his record of 27–0–21 Knockouts and the loss stopped him from landing a bout with Floyd Mayweather Jr.

=== IBF welterweight champion ===
==== Berto vs. Zaveck ====
On September 3, 2011, Berto returned after his defeat to Victor Ortíz to face IBF welterweight champion and Ring Top 10 welterweight Dejan Zavec. After 5 rounds of a closely competitive fight, Zaveck's corner stopped the fight as he had been cut. The two men embraced and Berto thanked the Slovenian fans for traveling over to America to cheer their countryman on. Berto called his performance "so-so", becoming a two-time world champion and the new IBF welterweight champion.

Berto relinquished his IBF welterweight title rather than face mandatory challenger Randall Bailey in order to facilitate the rematch with Ortiz because he wanted the opportunity to avenge his only defeat (at the time).

After testing positive for a banned substance, the rematch against Ortiz planned for June 23, 2012, was cancelled. It has since been ruled that Berto's positive test was the result of contamination, and Berto regained his boxing license. Josesito Lopez replaced Berto and fought Ortiz on the scheduled date at the Staples Center in Los Angeles. Lopez stopped Ortiz after 9 rounds claiming the vacant WBC silver welterweight title.

=== Consecutive defeats ===
==== Berto vs. Guerrero ====
Berto's next fight was scheduled for November 24, 2012, in Ontario, California. The opponent was Ring Top 10 welterweight and WBC Interim welterweight champion Robert Guerrero. Berto was knocked down twice early in the fight but came back well to give Guerrero a tough scrap, but Guerrero managed to narrowly maintain control and won via unanimous decision. Both of Berto's eyes and Guerrero's right eye were closed shut by the end of the fight.

==== Berto vs. Soto Karass ====
Following an 8-month lay-off after losing to Guerrero, Berto eventually returned to the ring to face Jesús Soto Karass on July 27, 2013, at the AT&T Center in San Antonio. In a tough, entertaining back-and-forth fight, Berto lost via TKO in the twelfth round after having put Soto Karass on the canvas in the previous round. At the time of the stoppage, one judge had Berto ahead in the fight 105–103, one had him behind in the fight 103–105, and the other judge had the fight even 104–104.

=== Career from 2014–2017 ===
On August 19, 2014, after a 14-month lay-off following consecutive defeats where he used most of that time nursing his injured shoulder, it was announced that Berto would fight journeyman Steve Upsher Chambers (24-3-1, 6 KO) on September 6 on Showtime in a 10-round bout, a day before his 31st birthday. Virgil Hunter trained Berto for the first time since announcing their partnership. Berto was going into this fight having not won since 2011. Chambers was going into the fight on a 2-fight losing streak. The fight took place at the U.S. Bank Arena, in Cincinnati, Ohio, on the Adrien Broner vs. Emmanuel Taylor card. Berto won the fight via unanimous decision with all three judges scoring the fight 99–91, giving Chambers only one round. Berto landed jabs often throughout the fight gaining confidence with right uppercuts and straight right hands to Chambers' head. Chambers did let his hands go in some rounds unloading flurrie but never took control of the fight as Berto seemed to be more comfortable with the pace of the fight.

==== Berto vs. López ====
On January 22, 2015, it was announced that Berto would fight Josesito López (33–6, 19 KOs) on March 13, as part of the new Premier Boxing Champions series on Spike TV. The fight took place at the Citizens Business Bank Arena in Ontario, California. The interim WBA welterweight title was at stake. Berto won the fight via TKO in round 6 to claim the vacant title. In an evenly matched fight, both fighters went back and forth the first 5 rounds. Lopez was the busier fighter landing solid punches, while Berto landed sharp Jabs and some hard rights hand. By the end of round 5, Lopez face was cut and bruised. In round 6, Berto landed 3 hard right hands in that dropped Lopez. He beat the count, another right hand put Lopez down again causing the referee to stop the fight at 1 minute and 3 seconds. Berto was booed following the win due to the fight taking place in Lopez's home state. Lopez won most of the early rounds after working on Berto's body. At the time of stoppage, one judge had Berto ahead 48–47, while the other two judges had it 50–45 and 48–47 in favor of Lopez.

==== Berto vs. Mayweather Jr. ====
On August 4, 2015, it was announced that, after months of speculation, a bout between Berto and Floyd Mayweather Jr. in Las Vegas would indeed take place on September 12, 2015.

Mayweather was able to pinpoint holes in Berto's guard and find a home for the jab early. He landed sharp counters and feint hooks while controlling range for the vast majority of the bout. Berto pushed the pace, but his aggressiveness fell short as Mayweather was highly mobile and closed the distance consistently. Mayweather hurt his left hand at the end of the ninth round but remained comfortable throughout the rest of the fight, winning via unanimous decision 117–111, 118–110, and 120–108. Mayweather dominated the fight, landing an impressive 56% [232/410] punches thrown, compared to Berto's underwhelming number of 17% [83/495] punches landed. Mayweather earned a purse of $32 million and Berto earned a career-high $4 million.

Early industry sources reported the fight drew 550,000 buys. Later sources indicated the number could have been as low as 400,000 buys, generating $28 million. This was the lowest number of buys Floyd had generated in over 10 years. The fight also gathered a crowd of 13,395, also a decreased figure compared to Mayweather previous fights.

==== Berto vs. Ortiz II ====
Five years after their first slugfest, Berto and Victor Ortíz finally met in a rematch on April 30, 2016, at the StubHub Center in Carson, California. Berto was down once in the 2nd round but was able to beat the count and subsequently came on strongly in round 4. Ortiz went down twice in the 4th round and although he was able to beat both counts, he didn't answer to referee Jack Reiss when asked if he wanted to continue. The bout would be called at the 1:44 mark. Berto stated afterwards that he would be willing to face Ortiz in a rubber match before then going on to call out WBC champion Danny Garcia.

==== Berto vs. Porter ====
On February 13, 2017, it was announced that a deal was close to being made between Berto and former welterweight world champion Shawn Porter (26-2-1, 16 KOs). On March 5, it was officially confirmed the fight would take place on April 22, 2017, at the Barclays Center in New York City with CBS confirming Showtime would televise the bout. Halfway through the press conference, promoter Lou DiBella confessed that he received a phone call from WBC president Mauricio Sulaiman and he reported the fight would be a final eliminator. On March 4, Keith Thurman defeated Danny Garcia to become the new WBA and WBC unified welterweight champion.

In front of 9,118, Berto failed to earn a world title fight when he was dropped and stopped in round 9. Berto suffered his fifth defeat in his last nine fights. Porter used power shots to the body of Berto to wear him down over the rounds. Berto was dropped in round 2, the same round Porter suffered a bad cut from clash of heads. After round 4, Porter was cut above both eyes and Berto was cut above the left eye, all due to clash of heads. At the time of stoppage, Porter was ahead on all scorecards, 79–72 and 78–74 (twice). Porter was the busier fighter, landing 175 of 448 punches thrown, whilst Berto landed 81 of 254 thrown (32%). Many experts called the fight dirty due to constant clash of heads and blood pouring from both fighters. Berto said, "I have to give him credit, but he's a rough fighter. He has great skills, but at the same time, he's going to be rough and try to handle me any way he can. I got a lot of head butts, and he did, too. Shawn is a tough competitor. We had a good, competitive fight until the head butts got to be a little too much for me. But I thought it was a really good fight before that."

Porter earned $1 million whilst Berto got the higher amount of $1.2 million for the fight. The fight averaged 468,000 viewers on Showtime.

=== Later career ===
==== Berto vs. Alexander ====
ESPN's Dan Rafael announced on April 28, 2018, that a deal had been reached for Berto to fight former 2-weight world champion Devon Alexander (27-4-1, 14 KOs) on the Errol Spence Jr. vs. Carlos Ocampo undercard on June 16 at The Ford Center at The Star in Frisco, Texas, however the fight did not take place. On June 25, the fight was slated to take place on the Mikey Garcia vs. Robert Easter Jr. lightweight unification card at the Staples Center on July 28 on Showtime. The fight would instead main event its own card on August 4 at the Nassau Veterans Memorial Coliseum in Uniondale, New York, on Fox. Berto was dropped earlier on but rallied on in the second half of the fight to win a controversial split decision. One judge scored the bout 114–113 for Alexander, but the remaining two judges overruled, both scoring 115–112 in favor of Berto, giving him the win. Alexander had the better workrate of the two in the opening rounds and dropped Berto in round 3 after catching him with a left hand to the head. Replays showed the two shots landed on the back of Berto's head. The knockdown stood because Berto had rotated his head before the punches landed. Alexander began to tire around midway and Berto started taking over. In round 7, after trading on the inside, Berto suffered a cut near his right eye. Berto was at his best in round 12 using both hands. Alexander fought back and both boxers traded close as the fight came to an end. Websites, Boxing Scene and BadLeftHook had Alexander the winner and felt although Berto caught up in the later rounds, he did not do enough to win the fight. Alexander thought the fight was close, but should have taken the decision. Berto stated he was not interested in a rematch as he was at the point in his career where he only wanted paydays. The fight averaged 1,193,000 viewers and peaked at 1,266,000 viewers.

==== Berto vs. Guerrero ====
On November 6, 2023, Berto revealed that he was fighting Robert Guerrero (37-6-1, 20 KOs) in a rematch, possibly on Benavidez vs Andrade undercard on November 25. It was never confirmed, however on December 9, a press release announced the rematch would instead take place on December 16 on a Premier Boxing Champions card from The Armory in Minneapolis on Showtime. It was also scheduled to be the final Showtime Championship Boxing card, as Showtime bowed out of boxing after 37 years. Berto was looking to avenge his defeat from November 2012, when he lost a unanimous decision. The fight was scheduled for 10 rounds. Berto weighed 148¼ pounds and Guerrero weight the same. The result was the same as the first meeting with Guerrero winning via a unanimous decision. Guerrero used the same tactics as the first bout, frequently holding and using mauling tactics. Berto was dropped in the fifth round, only for referee Robert Hoyle to rule it a push. Hoyle was busy throughout the fight, constantly breaking up clinches. The three judges scored it 99-91, 98-92, 98-92 all in favour of Guerrero.

== Personal life ==
In a March 2010 column he wrote for The New York Times, Berto described some of his efforts for Project Medishare in Haiti after the earthquake, as well as relating that he is frequently mistaken for American football star Reggie Bush. Berto's late father Dieuseul was a retired professional kickboxer who competed at UFC 10, while his sister Revelina and brother James Edson Berto are both professional mixed martial artists themselves. Berto is often called "Mike", his middle name.

Berto married Porsha Nicole Berto in 2020 after being together since 2020. Together they have three children. A daughter named Legaci, born in February 2019, and two sons named Levi Michael, born in late 2020, and Lenox, born in November 2024.

Berto and his Dutch Shepherd Nino appeared on the reality series Canine Intervention.

== Professional boxing record ==
38 fights	32 wins	6 losses
By knockout	24	2
By decision	8	4

No.	Result	Record	Opponent	Type	Round, time	Date	Location	Notes
38	Loss	32–6	Robert Guerrero	UD	10	Dec 16, 2023	Minneapolis Armory, Minneapolis, Minnesota, U.S.	
37	Win	32–5	Devon Alexander	SD	12	Aug 4, 2018	Nassau Coliseum, Uniondale, New York, U.S.	
36	Loss	31–5	Shawn Porter	TKO	9 (12), 1:31	Apr 22, 2017	Barclays Center, New York City, New York, U.S.	
35	Win	31–4	Victor Ortiz	KO	4 (12), 1:14	Apr 30, 2016	StubHub Center, Carson, California, U.S.	
34	Loss	30–4	Floyd Mayweather Jr.	UD	12	Sep 12, 2015	MGM Grand Garden Arena, Paradise, Nevada, U.S.	For WBA (Unified), WBC, and The Ring welterweight titles
33	Win	30–3	Josesito López	TKO	6 (12), 1:03	Mar 13, 2015	Citizens Business Bank Arena, Ontario, California, U.S.	Won WBA interim welterweight title
32	Win	29–3	Steve Upsher Chambers	UD	10	Sep 6, 2014	U.S. Bank Arena, Cincinnati, Ohio, U.S.	
31	Loss	28–3	Jesús Soto Karass	TKO	12 (12), 0:48	Jul 27, 2013	AT&T Center, San Antonio, Texas, U.S.	For vacant NABF welterweight title
30	Loss	28–2	Robert Guerrero	UD	12	Nov 24, 2012	Citizens Business Bank Arena, Ontario, California, U.S.	For WBC interim welterweight title
29	Win	28–1	Jan Zaveck	RTD	5 (12), 3:00	Sep 3, 2011	Beau Rivage, Biloxi, Mississippi, U.S.	Won IBF welterweight title
28	Loss	27–1	Victor Ortiz	UD	12	Apr 16, 2011	Foxwoods Resort Casino, Ledyard, Connecticut, U.S.	Lost WBC welterweight title
27	Win	27–0	Freddy Hernández	TKO	1 (12), 2:07	Nov 27, 2010	MGM Grand Garden Arena, Paradise, Nevada, U.S.	Retained WBC welterweight title
26	Win	26–0	Carlos Quintana	TKO	8 (12), 2:16	Apr 10, 2010	BankAtlantic Center, Sunrise, Florida, U.S.	Retained WBC welterweight title
25	Win	25–0	Juan Urango	UD	12	May 30, 2009	Hard Rock Live, Hollywood, Florida, U.S.	Retained WBC welterweight title
24	Win	24–0	Luis Collazo	UD	12	Jan 17, 2009	Beau Rivage, Biloxi, Mississippi, U.S.	Retained WBC welterweight title
23	Win	23–0	Steve Forbes	UD	12	Sep 27, 2008	Home Depot Center, Carson, California, U.S.	Retained WBC welterweight title
22	Win	22–0	Miguel Ángel Rodríguez	TKO	7 (12), 2:13	Jun 21, 2008	FedExForum, Memphis, Tennessee, U.S.	Won vacant WBC welterweight title
21	Win	21–0	Michel Trabant	RTD	6 (10), 3:00	Feb 9, 2008	Pechanga Resort & Casino, Temecula, California, U.S.	Retained NABF welterweight title
20	Win	20–0	David Estrada	TKO	11 (12), 1:17	Sep 29, 2007	Boardwalk Hall, Atlantic City, New Jersey, U.S.	Won vacant NABF welterweight title
19	Win	19–0	Cosme Rivera	UD	10	Jul 27, 2007	City Center, Saratoga Springs, New York, U.S.	
18	Win	18–0	Martinus Clay	TKO	7 (10), 2:15	May 19, 2007	FedExForum, Memphis, Tennessee, U.S.	
17	Win	17–0	Norberto Bravo	TKO	1 (10), 2:28	Feb 17, 2007	Hammerstein Ballroom, New York City, New York, U.S.	
16	Win	16–0	Miguel Figueroa	TKO	6 (10), 1:59	Dec 9, 2006	Alltel Arena, North Little Rock, Arkansas, U.S.	
15	Win	15–0	James Crayton	KO	5 (8), 0:34	Oct 21, 2006	Don Haskins Center, El Paso, Texas, U.S.	
14	Win	14–0	Roberto Valenzuela	TKO	1 (8), 2:19	Aug 5, 2006	Madison Square Garden, New York City, New York, U.S.	
13	Win	13–0	Sammy Sparkman	TKO	2 (10), 2:50	Jun 17, 2006	FedExForum, Memphis, Tennessee, U.S.	
12	Win	12–0	Gerardo Cesar Prieto	TKO	3 (4), 1:52	May 17, 2006	Mohegan Sun Arena, Montville, Connecticut, U.S.	
11	Win	11–0	Horatio García	RTD	3 (8), 3:00	Apr 14, 2006	Agua Caliente Casino Resort Spa, Rancho Mirage, California, U.S.	
10	Win	10–0	Jonathan Tubbs	TKO	3 (8), 2:44	Feb 3, 2006	Northern Quest Resort & Casino, Airway Heights, Washington, U.S.	
9	Win	9–0	Taronze Washington	KO	1 (8), 2:50	Dec 3, 2005	Mandalay Bay Events Center, Paradise, Nevada, U.S.	
8	Win	8–0	Maurice Chalmers	TKO	1 (6), 1:36	Nov 4, 2005	Buffalo Run Casino, Miami, Oklahoma, U.S.	
7	Win	7–0	William Johnson	KO	1 (4), 1:36	Oct 1, 2005	St. Pete Times Forum, Tampa, Florida, U.S.	
6	Win	6–0	Anthony Little	TKO	6 (6), 1:36	Jun 9, 2005	Manhattan Center Grand Ballroom, New York City, New York, U.S.	
5	Win	5–0	Tim Himes	TKO	1 (6), 2:10	May 6, 2005	Foxwoods Resort Casino, Ledyard, Connecticut, U.S.	
4	Win	4–0	Daniel Neal	UD	4	Feb 24, 2005	Hammerstein Ballroom, New York City, New York, U.S.	
3	Win	3–0	Edgar Galvan	TKO	1 (4), 1:59	Jan 28, 2005	Hammerstein Ballroom, New York City, New York, U.S.	
2	Win	2–0	Joseph Benjamin	UD	4	Jan 21, 2005	Mohegan Sun Arena, Montville, Connecticut, U.S.	
1	Win	1–0	Michael Robinson	TKO	3 (4), 2:15	Dec 4, 2004	Barton Coliseum, Little Rock, Arkansas, U.S.	

== Pay-per-view bouts ==
Date	Fight	Billing	Buys	Network	Revenue
September 12, 2015	Mayweather vs. Berto	High Stakes	400,000	Showtime	$28,000,000

Sporting positions
Amateur boxing titles
Previous: Sechew Powell	U.S. Golden Gloves light middleweight champion 2001	Next: Jesse Briseno
Previous: Durrell Richardson	U.S. Golden Gloves welterweight champion 2003	Next: Daniel Jacobs
Regional boxing titles
Vacant Title last held by Golden Johnson	NABF welterweight champion September 29, 2007 – June 21, 2008; Won WBC title	Vacant Title next held by Jesús Soto Karass
World boxing titles
Vacant Title last held by Floyd Mayweather Jr.	WBC welterweight champion June 21, 2008 – April 16, 2011	Succeeded by Victor Ortiz
Preceded by Jan Zaveck	IBF welterweight champion September 3, 2011 – November 8, 2011; Vacated	Vacant Title next held by Randall Bailey
Vacant Title last held by Keith Thurman	WBA welterweight champion Interim title March 13, 2015 – September 12, 2015; Failed to win Super title	Vacant Title next held by David Avanesyan
Awards
Previous: Joel Julio	ESPN Prospect of the Year; 2006	Next: Amir Khan
Previous: Giovani Segura vs. Iván Calderón	The Ring Fight of the Year vs. Victor Ortiz; 2011	Next: Juan Manuel Márquez vs. Manny Pacquiao IV
