= Keith Thurman =

American boxer

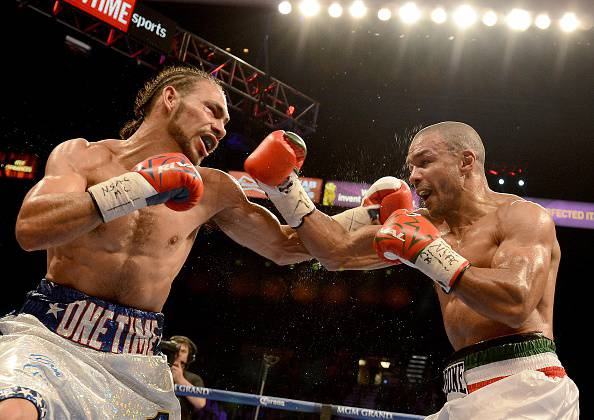
- Thurman in 2014

Personal information
- Nickname: One Time
- Born: Keith Fitzgerald Thurman Jr. November 23, 1988 (age 37) Clearwater, Florida, U.S.
- Height: 5 ft 7 1/2 in (171 cm)
- Weight: Welterweight; Light middleweight

Boxing career
- Reach: 69 in (175 cm)
- Stance: Orthodox

Boxing record
- Total fights: 34
- Wins: 31
- Win by KO: 23
- Losses: 2
- No contests: 1

Keith Fitzgerald Thurman (born November 23, 1988) is an American professional boxer. He is a former unified welterweight world champion, having held the WBA title from 2016 to 2019 (promoted to Super champion in 2017), and the WBC title from 2017 to 2018. As of July 2022, he is ranked as the world's fifth best active welterweight by BoxRec.

== Early life ==
Thurman was born in Clearwater, Florida, to an African-American father and a European-American mother of Polish and Hungarian descent.

== Amateur career ==
Thurman's first amateur fight was in 1997. He was trained by the late Benjamin Getty who worked with Sugar Ray Leonard. Getty took Thurman under his belt as a child and helped shape him into the fighter he is today. Thurman is now trained by Dan Birmingham. Thurman finished his amateur career with 101 victories (76 KO's), he won 6 National Championships including the 2004 PAL National Championships cadet (16yo) division. In 2007 he lost twice to world champion Demetrius Andrade at the Olympic Trials and won the silver medal.

== Professional career ==
=== Early career ===
On November 9, 2007, an 18-year-old Thurman debuted as a light middleweight against Kensky Rodney at the A La Carte Event Pavilion in Tampa, Florida, in a scheduled 4 round fight. Thurman won via first-round KO after a body shot floored Rodney. On August 8, 2008, Thurman defeated undefeated Jamaican Omar Bell (6–0, 4 KOs) via first-round knockout following an uppercut and left hand. Thurman faced off against Francisco Garcia in April 2009. The fight lasted less than 3 minutes after an accidental clash of heads halted the fight and it was announced as a no contest. In November 2009, Thurman was taken the 8 round distance by Brazilian Edvan Dos Santos Barros (10–7–1, 7 KOs). The scorecards read 80–71 79–72 (twice) all in favour of Thurman.

On July 23, 2010, Thurman beat the undefeated Stalinn Lopez (7–0, 3 KOs), the fight was on TeleFutura. Over the course of the next few years, Thurman developed from being a 'puncher' to become a more well rounded 'boxer puncher'. On November 26, 2012, Thurman brutally knocked 36-year-old Carlos Quintana (29–3, 23 KOs) out in the fourth round to win the WBO NABO super welterweight title. Quintana announced his retirement from professional boxing after the loss.

=== Welterweight ===
==== Thurman vs. Zaveck ====
On March 9, 2013, Thurman who had 19 wins in as many fights moved down to welterweight weight and fought on the undercard of Hopkins-Cloud at the Barclays Center in New York City. His opponent was 36-year-old former IBF welterweight champion Jan Zaveck (32–2, 18 KOs). Thurman won via unanimous decision after a one-sided 12 round bout, all three judges scored it 120–108 for Thurman, who in the process also won the WBO Inter-Continental welterweight title. It was the first time Thurman fought in a scheduled 12-round bout and his first time to go beyond the eighth round. After the bout, Thurman admitted it was a tough fight and he had prepared to go the distance, whilst also looking for a knockout, which he couldn't find. Thurman called Zaveck 'a true veteran and great boxing lesson' for him.

=== WBA interim welterweight champion ===
==== Thurman vs. Chaves ====
Despite being the mandatory to the WBO title, on July 27, 2013, Thurman challenged the Interim WBA welterweight champion Diego Gabriel Chaves (22–0, 18 KOs) at the AT&T Center in San Antonio, Texas. Thurman won the Interim WBA title by knocking out Chaves in the tenth round of a very competitive fight. At the time of the knockout, Thurman led on all three cards: 87–83, 87–83, 86–84 thanks in part to a knockdown in round 9 which was the beginning of the end for Chaves. Thurman had been landing extremely strong body shots the entire fight and finally dropped Chaves with one of the same. The end for Chaves came after another hook to the body and a huge overhand right to the forehead. Thurman was never in trouble but absorbed some strong body work as well from Chaves. They traded close rounds early until Chaves really slowed around the seventh, opening the door for Thurman's left hook.

==== Thurman vs. Soto Karass ====
On October 12, 2013, it was announced that Thurman would make his first defense of the Interim title on the Broner vs. Maidana WBA world title fight on December 14 against battle tested Jesús Soto Karass (28–8–3, 18 KOs) at the Alamodome in San Antonio, Texas. Soto Karass was coming off a stunning knockout victory over former champion Andre Berto and was deemed to be a difficult opponent. After a slow start Thurman took over the fight in the middle rounds as he floored Soto Karass in the fifth round before landing a brutal combination in the ninth round sending Soto Karass to the canvas for a second time in the fight and stopping him. Thurman was ahead on all the cards (79–72, 78–73 & 80–71) and turned another strong performance. Thurman boxed patiently, cautiously and smartly, pacing himself and respecting Soto Karass' hand power despite Soto Karass' lack of hand speed. With many prospects and potential good match-ups at welterweight, Thurman claimed he wasn't afraid to lose and wanted to fight the best. Golden Boy promoter Richard Schaefer said, "The Broner-Maidana winner is a possibility. There are so many great match-ups, but he is certainly right there at the very top of the 147-pound weight class."

==== Thurman vs. Diaz, Bundu ====
On March 25, 2014, it was confirmed that Thurman would fight veteran Mexican boxer and former IBF lightweight champion Julio Díaz (40–9–1, 29 KOs) at the StubHub Center in Carson, California, on April 26. ESPN announced the fight would take place on Showtime. Thurman defeated Diaz to retain his Interim WBA title. Diaz was forced to take a knee in round 2 following a left hook to his head. Boos were heard around the arena as Diaz failed to come out of his corner for round 4. It was believed that Diaz was hurt badly with a body shot. Diaz praised Thurman after the fight and said, "I've been a two-time world champion. I've never given up in a fight. I'm human. [Thurman] has some power. That's how boxing is." Thurman mentioned then-titleholder Shawn Porter as a potential opponent. Thurman received a $600,000 purse for the fight.

Thurman's trainer, Dan Birmingham confirmed that Thurman would next defend his title on the undercard of Khan vs. Alexander on December 13 at the MGM Grand Arena in Las Vegas against 40-year-old undefeated Italian boxer Leonard Bundu (31–0–2, 11 KOs). The fight was originally set to take place at the Mandalay Bay Events Center. Prior to the fight, Thurman vowed to stop Bundu, who was the current European welterweight champion, having held the title since 2012. Thurman was taken the distance for only the third time in professional career, dropping Bundu in the opening round and going on to win a clear decision (120–107, 3 times). Bundu's awkward style saw Thurman on the back foot for majority of the fight, which drew boos from the crowd. At the weigh in before the fight, Thurman called out Floyd Mayweather Jr., however after the fight, he called out Marcos Maidana, who sat at ringside. Thurman stated after the fight that he was happy to have gone the distance and blamed ring rust.

=== WBA welterweight champion ===
On January 28, 2015, Thurman was elevated to the full WBA welterweight championship.

==== Thurman vs. Guerrero ====
On January 14, 2015 Al Haymon announced that Thurman would fight 31-year-old former world champion Robert Guerrero (32–2–1, 18 KOs) on March 7 at the MGM Grand in Las Vegas. The two boxers were supposed to fight one another in 2013, but negotiations fell through. Thurman started the fight off aggressively and dominated early on. During the bout there was some exciting exchanges between Guerrero and Thurman, although Thurman won most of those exchanges and able to outbox Guerrero rather easily for most of the fight. There was an accidental head-butt left Thurman with swelling on the left side of his forehead in round 3, but that did not hamper Thurman's aggressiveness. He knocked Guerrero down in the ninth round before going on to win a (120–107, 118–109 and 118–108) unanimous decision in a rather one-sided bout. In the post-fight, Guerrero praised Thurman saying, "He is one of the best. He came in and stuck to his game plan. I take my hat off to him. I'm not a hater." Thurman received a purse of $1.5 million, whilst Guerrero received $1.225 million. According to CompuBox stats, Thurman connected on 211 of 598 punches (35 percent), and Guerrero landed 104 of 497 (21 percent). The fight peaked at 4.2 million viewers, making it the most watched fight since 1998. The whole card averaged 3.13 million viewers.

==== Thurman vs. Collazo ====
On May 21, 2015, PBC announced Thurman's next bout would take place at the USF Sun Dome in Tampa, Florida, outside his hometown of Clearwater, on July 11, against veteran slugger Luis Collazo (36–6, 19 KOs) on ESPN. Thurman was excited to be in a world title fight in his home state, having last fought there in November 2008. The attendance for the fight 4,136. Collazo badly hurt Thurman with a body shot in the fifth round but the fight ended after the seventh round due to an injury near the eye of Collazo, which blocked his vision. Thurman was declared the winner via TKO. At the time of stoppage, Thurman was ahead 69–64, 68–65, and 69–64 on the scorecards. Thurman commented on fighting Floyd Mayweather after the bout saying, "I'm a young, strong champion, Floyd. Come get it, I'm undefeated like you, baby. Come take my 0 baby! Come take my 0! I'm ready. I'm ready." Collazo received a $500,000 purse compared to Thurman's $1.5 million. Thurman landed 119 of 348 punches (34 percent) while Collazo connected on just 76 of 244 (31 percent). The fight peaked 1.1 million viewers, averaging only 799,000 viewers.

On January 8, 2016 Premier Boxing Champions requested to the WBA, the upcoming fight between Danny García and Robert Guerrero be for the vacant WBA 'Super' title as Floyd Mayweather Jr. had retired. The WBA denied to sanction the fight, citing they would like to have no more than two welterweight titleholders.

==== Thurman vs. Porter ====
It was announced on February 17, Thurman would defend his title against Shawn Porter (26–1–1, 16 KOs) on March 12, 2016, at the Mohegan Sun Casino in Uncasville, Connecticut. On February 23, Thurman's promoter said he had been forced to postpone his upcoming fight with Porter after being injured in a car accident. Lou Di Bella has insisted the injury is not serious or career threatening, but admits the American was lucky to have escaped major injury. Thurman, following the advice of his doctors, was on the sidelines for approximately six weeks before resuming training. Porter announced that his rescheduled world title clash against Thurman will take place on June 25 at the Barclays Center. The World Boxing Association then ordered the winner of the Thurman and Porter to face interim WBA welterweight champion David Avanesyan (22–1–1, 11 KOs), who beat No. 3 WBA Shane Mosley (49–10–1, 41 KOs) on May 28.

In an old-fashioned fight of the year candidate, Thurman successfully defended his title, before a crowd of 12,718, when all three judges scored an identical 115–113 in his favor. Thurman rocked Porter badly on multiple occasions in the fight, he was also hurt himself by a body shot in the eighth round. Thurman earned a $1.4 million purse. This was the first main event televised by CBS in prime time since February 15, 1978, when Muhammad Ali lost a 15-round split decision and the heavyweight title to Leon Spinks in a massive upset. Thurman landed 235 of 539 punches (44 percent) and Porter landed 236 of 662 (36 percent). After the fight, there was immediate talks of a rematch. The fight averaged 3.1 million viewers, according to ESPN. The card itself averaged 2.4 million viewers. The live gate was over $1.1 million in ticket sales, the highest gate in the history of Barclays Center to date, it was also the second highest attendance in the history of Barclays Center, with over 12,000 paying customers in attendance. Premier Boxing Champions voted the bout as their 'Fight of the Year'.

On July 15, WBA announced Thurman would have a mandatory defense against interim WBA champion David Avanesyan (22–1–1, 11 KOs). Both camps had until August 13 to negotiate the fight or the WBA will order a purse bid. Due to negotiations breaking down, the WBA elevated Avanesyan to 'regular' champion and Thurman was named as the WBA's 'super' champion.

=== Unified welterweight champion ===
==== Thurman vs. García ====
On October 25, 2016, Showtime announced several fights to take place towards the end of 2016 and early 2017. One of them was the much anticipated welterweight unification fight between Thurman and fellow undefeated welterweight champion Danny García (33–0, 19 KOs), who holds the WBC title. García defeated journeyman Samuel Vargas in a tune-up fight on November 12, which officially set up the fight for March 4, 2017, at the Barclays Center in New York City. Unlike García, Thurman chose not to have any tune-up and would fight García after a long 9-month rest. Thurman was ringside at García vs. Vargas and entered the ring after the bout was over. In an interview, he stated, "You have two big punchers meeting on March 4, I don't see how the fight can go 12 rounds. I see myself as the best competition that Danny has ever faced." García replied by simply telling Thurman, he was next. At a press conference on January 18, 2017, the fight was officially announced and it was said that it would be shown live on CBS. The conference got extremely heated, leading to Angel García standing up and shouting racial slurs towards Thurman.

Thurman won the fight match via split decision with the scorecards 116–112, 113–115 & 115–113, making him a unified welterweight world champion. Thurman started off as the aggressor hitting and moving back to avoid García's counter hooks. This was the case for the majority of the fight. García began coming forward through the middle rounds and push Thurman on the back foot. Thurman backed off the championship rounds believing he had a comfortable enough lead to win the fight. MC Jimmy Lennon Jr. gave García false hope that he had won the fight when he announced WBA before WBC, making García believed he had won. In the post fight, Thurman credited his defensive work, "I was not giving the fight away. I felt like we had a nice lead, [and] we could cool down. I felt like we were controlling the three-minute intervals every round. My defense was effective. He wasn't landing." Compubox stats showed Thurman landed 147 of 570 punches thrown, a percentage of 26% and García landed 130 punches of his 434 thrown (30%). It was also reported that both fighters received a purse of $2 million a piece. The fight was attended by a boxing record of 16,533 at the Barclays Center.

According to The Ring, the fight peaked at 5.1 million viewers, which was at the last three rounds. The fight averaged 3.74 million viewers. This was the first time since 1998 that a Saturday primetime boxing telecast drew that kind of audience. The entire card drew an average 3.1 million viewers.

==== Inactivity ====
On May 19, it was reported that Thurman would be out of action for at least six months following surgery on his right elbow. Thurman said he would get back into training after four months.

On October 3, Lamont Peterson wrote to the WBA officially vacating his 'Regular' title, which meant Thurman was now their only belt-holder at welterweight. At the WBCs 55th annual convention in October 2017, it was revealed that Thurman would next fight in January 2018 in a voluntary defence. On October 14, Thurman confirmed that he would return to the ring latest by March 2018. He stated that he would not be taking the rematch with Porter nor would he be fighting IBF titleholder Errol Spence Jr. (22–0, 19 KOs) on his return bout. According to sources in early January 2018, former welterweight titlist Jessie Vargas (28–2, 10 KOs) was being lined up to challenge Thurman on his return. On January 24, Showtime announced that Thurman would return to the Barclays Center for the third consecutive time on May 19 and Thurman denied any rumours, stating that he would not be fighting Vargas. On March 30, it was reported that Thurman suffered a deep bruise to his left hand and has been forced to pull out of his next fight, scheduled for May 19.

On April 24, Thurman vacated his WBC title, forcing the organisation to mandate Porter vs. García for the vacant title. The WBC made Thurman champion emeritus. Thurman explained, "Due to my rehabilitation from my injuries, I agreed to relinquish my WBC title at this time. I continue to rehab my hand and elbow and I look forward to getting back in the ring this summer. This is a temporary setback and I will be the unified champion once again and look forward to winning back my WBC title as soon as possible."

==== Thurman vs. López ====
In November 2018, it was announced that Thurman would fight Josesito López on January 26, 2019, at Barclays Center, to defend his WBA welterweight title. López stated that for his return, he wanted to have one "tune-up" fight, and then "return to being an active world-class fighter again". Thurman got rocked in the seventh round, but ultimately he won the fight by majority decision.

==== Thurman vs. Pacquiao ====
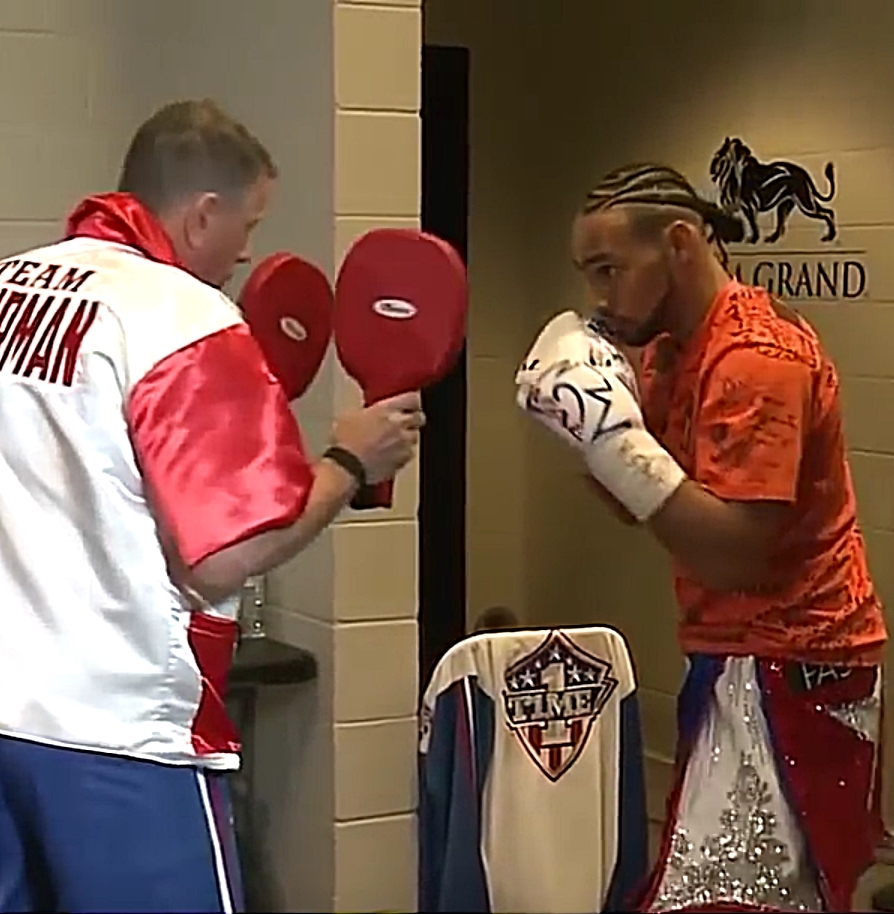
Thurman warming up with his trainer Dan Birmingham for the Pacquiao fight.

In May 2019, it was announced that he would face eight-division world champion Manny Pacquiao (61–7–2, 39 KO's) on July 20, 2019. Pacquiao won the first round with a late knockdown following a left-right combination to the body and head. This was the first time Thurman had ever been knocked down in his career. Pacquiao continued to outbox Thurman until the mid-rounds, when Thurman found some success. Pacquiao was ultimately declared the victor by split decision (113–114, 115–112, 115–112). Thurman praised Pacquiao after the fight, calling him a legendary boxer, also stating "nothing wrong with losing to a legend".

=== Career from 2022 ===
==== Thurman vs. Barrios ====
Thurman would not return to the ring following the first defeat of his professional career for almost 31 months, declaring "Until my retirement every day is a day closer to my fight", when he fought former WBA (Regular) super lightweight champion Mario Barrios on February 5, 2022. Similar to Thurman, Barrios was also coming off the first defeat of his professional career, when he had been stopped by Gervonta Davis in June 2021. Thurman imposed himself on Barrios and proved to be a class above his opponent, winning a unanimous decision with judges' scorecards of 117–111 and 118–110 twice in a dominant display on Fox Sports pay-per-view.,

==== Thurman vs. Jarvis ====
On March 12, 2025, Thurman faced Brock Jarvis at the Hordern Pavilion in Sydney, Australia. He defeated Jarvis via TKO in the third round.

==== Thurman vs. Fundora ====
Thurman was scheduled to challenge Sebastian Fundora for his WBC light middleweight title at the MGM Garden Arena in Las Vegas on October 25, 2025. After Fundora suffered an injury, the bout was rescheduled for March 28, 2026. Thurman suffered the first stoppage defeat of his professional career, losing by technical knockout in the sixth round.

==== Cancelled Vergil Ortiz fight ====
On October 6, 2026, Oscar De La Hoya revealed talks were in place for Vergil Ortiz (24–0, 22 KOs) to fight Thurman. Thurman later made a statement suggesting Ortiz would be a much tougher fight than Fundora. De La Hoya described the bout as a result of circumstance, saying it was “not the fight I wanted” but that Thurman was “the only big name guy available”. De La Hoya also praised Thurman, describing him as a fighter with “the heart of a lion”. The fight was set to take place at middleweight, where Thurman had never competed. On October 22, the fight was made official for the undercard of the PBC PPV headlined by David Benavidez vs. Michał Cieślak on December 5 at the Desert Diamond Arena in Glendale, Arizona. Ortiz also praised Thurman for taking the fight, stating that other champions "ducked" him. On November 20, Thurman withdrew from the fight due to an injury, leaving Ortiz to find a replacement opponent.

== Personal life ==
In 2016, he started dating Nepalese native Priyana Thapa. In 2017, the couple got married.

== Professional boxing record ==
34 fights	31 wins	2 losses
By knockout	23	1
By decision	8	1
No contests	1	

No.	Result	Record	Opponent	Type	Round, time	Date	Location	Notes
34	Loss	31–2 (1)	Sebastian Fundora	TKO	6 (12), 1:17	Mar 28, 2026	MGM Grand Garden Arena, Paradise, Nevada, U.S.	For WBC super welterweight title
33	Win	31–1 (1)	Brock Jarvis	TKO	3 (10), 2:19	Mar 12, 2025	Hordern Pavilion, Sydney, Australia	
32	Win	30–1 (1)	Mario Barrios	UD	12	Feb 5, 2022	Michelob Ultra Arena, Paradise, Nevada, U.S.	
31	Loss	29–1 (1)	Manny Pacquiao	SD	12	Jul 20, 2019	MGM Grand Garden Arena, Paradise, Nevada, U.S.	Lost WBA (Super) welterweight title
30	Win	29–0 (1)	Josesito López	MD	12	Jan 26, 2019	Barclays Center, New York, City, New York, U.S.	Retained WBA (Super) welterweight title
29	Win	28–0 (1)	Danny García	SD	12	Mar 4, 2017	Barclays Center, New York, City, New York, U.S.	Retained WBA (Super) welterweight title; Won WBC welterweight title
28	Win	27–0 (1)	Shawn Porter	UD	12	Jun 25, 2016	Mohegan Sun Arena, Uncasville, Connecticut, U.S.	Retained WBA welterweight title
27	Win	26–0 (1)	Luis Collazo	RTD	7 (12), 3:00	Jul 11, 2015	USF Sun Dome, Tampa, Florida, U.S.	Retained WBA (Regular) welterweight title
26	Win	25–0 (1)	Robert Guerrero	UD	12	Mar 7, 2015	MGM Grand Garden Arena, Paradise, Nevada, U.S.	Retained WBA (Regular) welterweight title
25	Win	24–0 (1)	Leonard Bundu	UD	12	Dec 13, 2014	MGM Grand Garden Arena, Paradise, Nevada, U.S.	Retained WBA interim welterweight title
24	Win	23–0 (1)	Julio Díaz	RTD	3 (12), 3:00	Apr 26, 2014	StubHub Center, Carson, California, U.S.	Retained WBA interim welterweight title
23	Win	22–0 (1)	Jesús Soto Karass	TKO	9 (12), 2:21	Dec 14, 2013	Alamodome, San Antonio, Texas, U.S.	Retained WBA interim welterweight title
22	Win	21–0 (1)	Diego Chaves	KO	10 (12), 0:28	Jul 27, 2013	AT&T Center, San Antonio, Texas, U.S.	Won WBA interim welterweight title
21	Win	20–0 (1)	Jan Zaveck	UD	12	Mar 9, 2013	Barclays Center, New York City, U.S.	Won WBO Inter-Continental welterweight title
20	Win	19–0 (1)	Carlos Quintana	TKO	4 (10), 2:19	Nov 24, 2012	Citizens Business Bank Arena, Ontario, California, U.S.	Won NABO junior middleweight title
19	Win	18–0 (1)	Orlando Lora	TKO	6 (10), 1:37	Jul 21, 2012	U.S. Bank Arena, Cincinnati, Ohio, U.S.	
18	Win	17–0 (1)	Brandon Hoskins	TKO	3 (8), 0:25	May 5, 2012	MGM Grand Garden Arena, Paradise, Nevada, U.S.	
17	Win	16–0 (1)	Christopher Fernandez	TKO	1 (8), 2:50	Feb 25, 2012	Scottrade Center, St. Louis, Missouri, U.S.	
16	Win	15–0 (1)	Favio Medina	TKO	4 (8), 2:34	Nov 27, 2010	MGM Grand Garden Arena, Paradise, Nevada, U.S.	
15	Win	14–0 (1)	Quandray Robertson	KO	3 (6), 2:40	Sep 18, 2010	Staples Center, Los Angeles, California, U.S.	
14	Win	13–0 (1)	Stalinn Lopez	KO	2 (6), 1:17	Jul 23, 2010	Pechanga Resort & Casino, Temecula, California, U.S.	
13	Win	12–0 (1)	Leonardo Rojas	TKO	2 (8), 2:07	Nov 28, 2009	Colisée Pepsi, Quebec City, Quebec, Canada	
12	Win	11–0 (1)	Edvan Dos Santos Barros	UD	8	Nov 6, 2009	Hyatt Regency, Tampa, Florida, U.S.	
11	Win	10–0 (1)	Travis Hartman	TKO	2 (6), 1:00	Aug 14, 2009	Desert Diamond Casino, Tucson, Arizona, U.S.	
10	Win	9–0 (1)	Marteze Logan	TKO	3 (6), 0:46	Jun 26, 2009	Desert Diamond Casino, Tucson, Arizona, U.S.	
9	NC	8–0 (1)	Francisco Garcia	NC	1 (6), 0:25	Apr 4, 2009	Frank Erwin Center, Austin, Texas, U.S.	Both boxers unable to continue after an accidental head clash
8	Win	8–0	Marcus Luck	TKO	1 (6), 1:53	Nov 7, 2008	A La Carte Event Pavilion, Tampa, Florida, U.S.	
7	Win	7–0	Omar Bell	KO	1 (6), 2:01	Aug 15, 2008	A La Carte Event Pavilion, Tampa, Florida, U.S.	
6	Win	6–0	Jason Jordan	KO	1 (6), 2:34	Jun 27, 2008	A La Carte Event Pavilion, Tampa, Florida, U.S.	
5	Win	5–0	Jessie Davis	KO	1 (4), 2:49	May 9, 2008	A La Carte Event Pavilion, Tampa, Florida, U.S.	
4	Win	4–0	Carlos Pena	TKO	1 (4), 1:31	Apr 5, 2008	Hilton Bayfront, St. Petersburg, Florida, U.S.	
3	Win	3–0	Brandon Buchanon	KO	1 (4), 1:08	Feb 14, 2008	A La Carte Event Pavilion, Tampa, Florida, U.S.	
2	Win	2–0	Tramiane Boone	KO	1 (4), 0:22	Jan 18, 2008	A La Carte Event Pavilion, Tampa, Florida, U.S.	
1	Win	1–0	Kensky Rodney	TKO	1 (4), 2:03	Nov 9, 2007	A La Carte Event Pavilion, Tampa, Florida, U.S.	

== Pay-per-view bouts ==
United States
Date	Fight	Billing	Buys	Network	Revenue
July 20, 2019	Pacquiao vs. Thurman	Welterweight Supremacy	500,000	FOX	$37,500,000

Sporting positions
Regional boxing titles
Preceded by Carlos Quintana	NABO junior middleweight champion November 24, 2012 – March 2013; Vacated	Vacant Title next held by Glen Tapia
Preceded by Jan Zaveck	WBO Inter-Continental welterweight champion March 9, 2013 – July 27, 2013; Won interim title	Vacant Title next held by Gabriel Bracero
World boxing titles
Preceded by Diego Chaves	WBA welterweight champion Interim title July 27, 2013 – January 28, 2015; Promoted	Vacant Title next held by Andre Berto
Vacant Title last held by Vyacheslav Senchenko	WBA welterweight champion Regular title January 28, 2015 – January 19, 2016; Promoted	Vacant Title next held by David Avanesyan
Vacant Title last held by Floyd Mayweather Jr.	WBA welterweight champion January 19, 2016 – July 20, 2019; Super champion from February 7, 2017	Succeeded by Manny Pacquiao
Preceded by Danny García	WBC welterweight champion March 4, 2017 – April 24, 2018; Vacated	Vacant Title next held by Shawn Porter
Awards
Previous: Gary Russell Jr.	The Ring Prospect of the Year; 2012	Next: Vasyl Lomachenko
Inaugural award	PBC Fighter of the Year; 2015	Next: Carl Frampton
Previous: Francisco Vargas vs. Takashi Miura	The Ring Fight of the Year vs. Shawn Porter; 2016	Next: Anthony Joshua vs. Wladimir Klitschko
Previous: Krzysztof Głowacki vs. Marco Huck	PBC Fight of the Year vs. Shawn Porter; 2016	Next: James DeGale vs. Badou Jack
