= Victor Ortiz =

American boxer

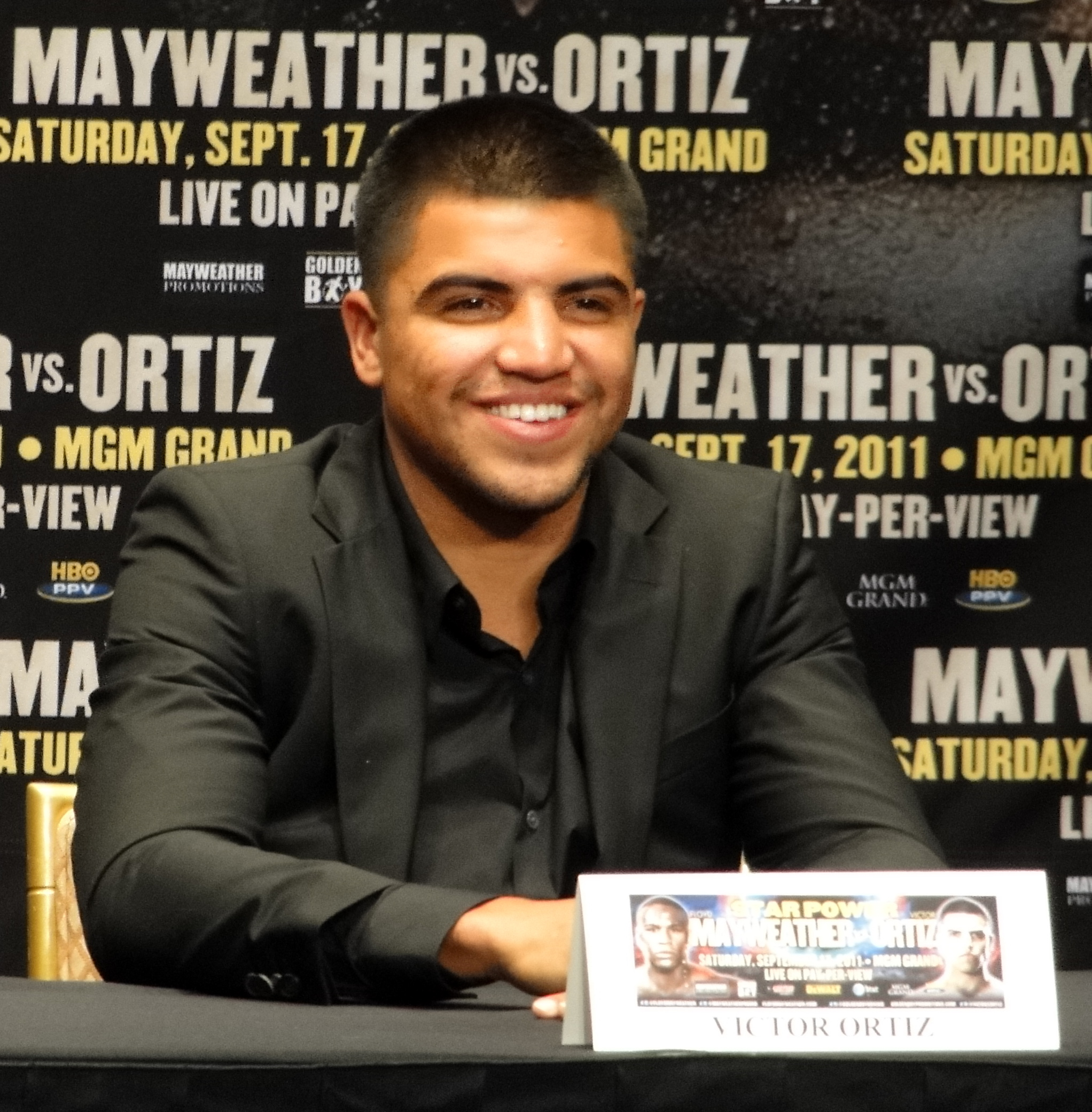
- Ortiz in 2011

Personal information
- Nickname: Vicious
- Born: January 31, 1987 (age 39) Garden City, Kansas, U.S.
- Height: 5 ft 9 in (175 cm)
- Weight: Light welterweight; Welterweight; Light middleweight

Boxing career
- Reach: 70 in (178 cm)
- Stance: Southpaw

Boxing record
- Total fights: 43
- Wins: 33
- Win by KO: 25
- Losses: 7
- Draws: 3

Victor Ortiz (born January 31, 1987) is an American professional boxer and film actor of Mexican descent. He held the WBC welterweight title in 2011, and was formerly rated as one of the world's top three active welterweights by a number of sporting news and boxing websites, including The Ring magazine, BoxRec, and ESPN. He was selected as the 2008 ESPN Prospect of the Year.

Outside of boxing, Ortiz has had roles in the films The Expendables 3 (2014) and Southpaw (2015), and made a cameo appearance in the TV series Ray Donovan.

== Early life ==
Ortiz was born and raised in Garden City, Kansas, and is the third of four children of Mexican parents. When he was seven years old, Ortiz's mother abandoned her family. Shortly thereafter, Ortiz began boxing at the insistence of his father, an alcoholic who often beat his children following his wife's departure. In an interview, Victor said, "I hated that lady. I drew her a card once with a little rose on it and I gave it to her. She just threw it down and said 'What do I want that shit for?' That's when I picked up boxing. Then my Dad started screwing up, drinking."

Ortiz' father also abandoned the family five years after their mother left, which forced Ortiz and his five siblings into the Kansas foster care system. Ortiz was twelve years old at the time. His older sister became a legal adult in 2002 and moved to Denver, Colorado. Ortiz and his younger brother left Kansas and moved in with her.

== Amateur career ==
While training at a Salvation Army Red Shield Community Center, he was noticed by former heavyweight boxing contender Ron Lyle, who had become a supervisor at the center. In 2003, Lyle guided Ortiz to a Junior Olympics tournament, where, at the age of sixteen, he won the 132-pound weight division with a perfect 5–0 record. This time, he was noticed by another former boxer, Roberto Garcia, who had held the IBF Super Featherweight Championship during the 1990s and whose father was the trainer of Fernando Vargas. One of Ortiz's notable early amateur fights was against Amir Khan, against whom he lost in a second-round stoppage.

=== Move to California ===
Though Garcia was based in Oxnard, California, he offered to train Ortiz, who accepted and moved from Colorado to California, where he began training at La Colonia Youth Boxing Club. Garcia later became Ortiz's legal guardian, and Ortiz graduated from Pacifica High School. At age 16, Ortiz won the 2003 Police Athletic League national championships in Toledo, then at seventeen, Ortiz reached the United States Olympic boxing trials in the 132-pound weight class, where he was eliminated in the champion's bracket semifinals (The weight class was instead won by Vicente Escobedo).

Ortiz turned professional later in 2004 while still only seventeen years of age. When he reached the age of eighteen in 2005 and became a legal adult, he gained custody of his younger brother, who is now a college student. Ortiz continues to reside in Ventura, California.

Victor Ortiz boxed at The Garden City Boxing club, where he was trained by five trainers who all worked together to get him ahead in his boxing career. His original trainers included Ignacio "Buck" Avilia, Manuel Rios, Antonio Orozco Sr., Juan M. Aldana Jr. and Alfred Ritz. He won the Ringside National Title in 2001 and 2002 and the National Jr. Olympics in 2002.

== Professional career ==
=== Light Welterweight ===
==== Early career ====
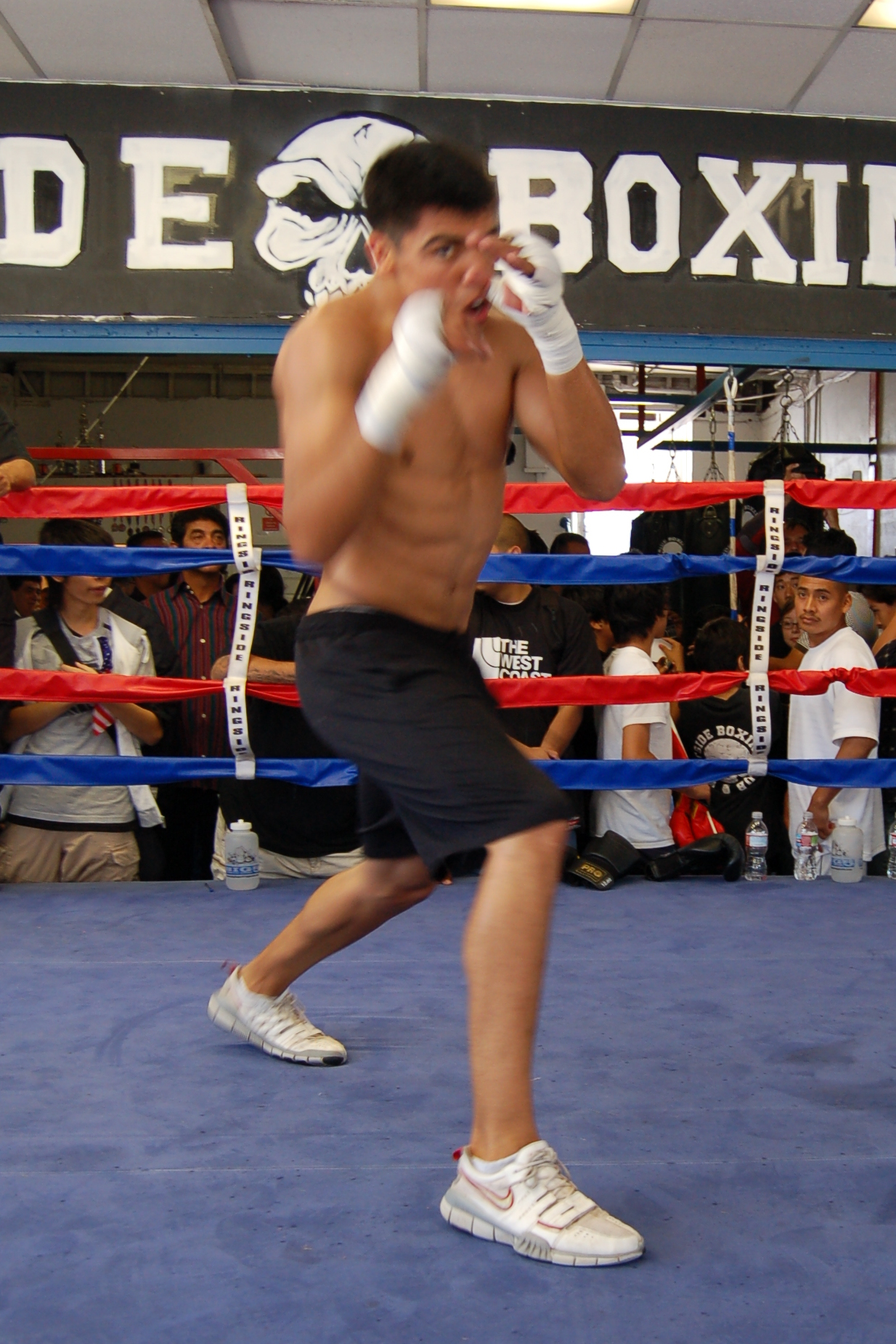
Victor Ortiz media workout at Westside Boxing Club in Los Angeles on June 24, 2009

After turning professional, Ortiz easily won his first seven fights against weak opposition. However, on June 3, 2005, Ortiz was controversially disqualified in the first round of a bout against unknown Corey Alarcon in Oxnard. After having already knocked Alarcon down once in the round, Ortiz knocked him down again shortly after referee David Denkin ordered the fighters to separate from a clinch. Alarcon stayed down for the count and was awarded the fight based on Denkin's judgment that Ortiz's knockout punch had been an illegal punch during a break.

Following the fight with Alarcon, Ortiz continued to win and had built a record of 18–1–1 as of August 30, 2007, when he fought his first well-known opponent, Emmanuel Clottey of Ghana, in only his second bout scheduled for ten rounds. Ortiz defeated Clottey by technical knockout in the tenth and final round. Three months later, Ortiz followed up on his victory with another knockout win, this time in the first round of a ten-round bout against former junior welterweight titlist Carlos Maussa of Colombia.

On September 13, 2008, Ortiz fought his first bout scheduled for twelve rounds, against Roberto David Arrieta of Argentina. Ortiz knocked Arrieta down in the second, fourth and fifth rounds and won by technical knockout in the fifth round. At the end of 2008, ESPN named Ortiz the boxing prospect of the year.

On March 7, 2009, Ortiz fought his first bout televised on HBO Boxing After Dark against Mike Arnaoutis of Greece, who had fought top-ten light welterweight contenders such as Juan Urango, Ricardo Torres and Kendall Holt without ever having been knocked out. However, Ortiz scored a technical knockout of Arnaoutis in the second round.

==== Ortiz vs. Maidana ====
On June 27, 2009, Ortiz faced Marcos Maidana (25–1–0) of Argentina in Los Angeles for the Interim WBA Light Welterweight title. Ortiz entered the fight with an eight-fight knockout streak. Maidana, a dangerous puncher, had won 24 of his 25 previous bouts by knockout. The only previous blemish on his record at that point was a close split decision loss to WBA Champion Andriy Kotelnik. Both Ortiz and Maidana were knocked down in the first round. Ortiz knocked Maidana to the canvas twice in the second round. Ortiz suffered a cut in the 5th round and was knocked down in the 6th round. The fight was stopped when the ringside physician would not let Ortiz continue to fight. Many in the boxing media, including HBO, chastised Ortiz for not wanting to continue in the fight, an issue which surfaced again later in his career after retiring in his fight against Josesito Lopez.

==== Comeback ====
Before the Maidana fight, Ortiz fired Roberto Garcia and Garcia's father. Ortiz expressed how the Garcias constantly humiliated him through derogatory speech but would then hire Garcia's brother Danny. After recovering from a broken wrist and switching trainers, Ortiz announced his return fight would be on HBO Boxing After Dark. On December 12, 2009, Ortiz bounced back from the defeat he suffered vs Maidana to stop Antonio Díaz, who failed to answer the bell for the seventh round. Ortiz then fought Hector Alatorre on February 25, 2010, winning by TKO in the tenth and final round.

==== Ortiz vs. Campbell, Harris ====
Ortiz was victorious in a unanimous decision victory over Nate Campbell on May 15 at Madison Square Garden on the Undercard of Amir Khan vs. Paulie Malignaggi. Ortiz, 23, was quicker, more active and landed heavier shots throughout the fight. Campbell, 38, did not seem to have much steam on his punches on the few occasions that he landed anything solid. He also appeared troubled all fight by Ortiz's southpaw style and straight left hand as he followed Ortiz around. Ortiz scored a knockdown on a short right hand, although it also looked like he shoved Campbell.

On September 18, 2010, Victor faced former WBA Light Welterweight Champion Vivian Harris on the Shane Mosley vs. Sergio Mora undercard at Staples Center. He was on ESPN's SportsNation to promote the fight with Harris. Victor landed 25-of-54 power punches. He dropped Harris with both hands and landed some nasty power punches. That short right really showed off the unique power possessed by Ortiz. Ortiz knocked Harris down three times in the second round en route to a knock out win with :45 seconds left in the third round.

==== Ortiz vs. Peterson ====
On the undercard of Amir Khan vs. Marcos Maidana, Ortiz faced former title challenger Lamont Peterson on December 11 at the Mandalay Bay Resort & Casino in Las Vegas. Peterson went down for the first time from a right hand that finished a four-punch combination. Peterson got up quickly and did not appear hurt. But he was moments later from another punch and he grabbed on to Ortiz as they tumbled to the mat. But when the fight resumed, Ortiz was on Peterson again and knocked him hard into the ropes, which held him up and caused referee Vic Drakulich to call the second knockdown of the round with about 30 seconds to go. One judge scored the bout a win for Peterson and the other two remaining judges scoring the bout a draw; the fight will go down on record as a draw. This was despite those who were in attendance saying that Ortiz clearly won the fight.

=== Welterweight ===
==== Ortiz vs. Berto I ====
Ortiz fought Andre Berto for the WBC Welterweight title on April 16, 2011, at the Foxwoods Resort Casino, Mashantucket. Hailed as the early pick for the fight of the year, Ortiz won the fight by unanimous decision over Berto. They both came out aggressively, then just over a minute into the round, Ortiz landed a shot behind Berto's head and Berto went down. Berto and Ortiz exchanged knockdowns in their fights with both of them going down twice. Both fighters were hurt in that fight. However, Berto took a lot of punishment while against the ropes and looked to be exhausted after the 6th. Ortiz had his way from the 7th on and only had to worry about an occasional big punch from Berto. The judges scored the match 115–110, 114–112, and 114–111 all for the new WBC Welterweight Champion. The bout was named The Ring magazine's "Fight of the Year" for 2011.

Ortiz would face Berto, whose first thrilling slugfest in April was one of the best fights of the year, once again. The fight, which had been in discussion for weeks, was originally supposed to take place at the MGM Grand Garden Arena in Las Vegas on February 11, 2012. The fight was postponed to June 30, 2012, due to Berto rupturing his biceps in training and being unable to meet the original date. On May 20, 2012, Berto failed an anti-doping test, testing positive for nandrolone. Although Berto denied having ever taken the substance intentionally, the rematch was cancelled and Light Welterweight Josesito Lopez was chosen to take his place. They did have a rematch eventually, in 2016.

==== Ortiz vs. Mayweather ====
On June 7, 2011, Floyd Mayweather Jr. announced via Twitter that he and Ortiz had an agreement to fight on September 17, 2011. The fight was for Ortiz's WBC Welterweight belt.

The fight took place at MGM Grand Garden Arena. From round one, Mayweather tagged Ortiz repeatedly. Mayweather seemed in control through the first three rounds, judges' scores 30–27, 30–27, and 29–28 for Mayweather, in the fourth round, Ortiz found success, landing a few shots and stinging Mayweather before bulling him into the corner. Out of frustration, Ortiz rammed Mayweather in the face with an intentional headbutt. Referee, Joe Cortez, called timeout and docked Ortiz a point for the foul. As the fight resumed, Ortiz approached Mayweather in the center of the ring and tried to apologize and even hugged Mayweather. After apologizing, Ortiz had his hands down, and Mayweather unloaded a left hook and a flush right hand to Ortiz's chin. Ortiz dropped and was unable to beat Cortez's count as the crowd of 14,687 were furious at the ruined fight.

"In the ring, you have to protect yourself at all times," Mayweather said. "After it happened, we touched gloves and we were back to fighting and then I threw the left hook and right hand after the break. You just gotta protect yourself at all times." Mayweather also said he would give Ortiz a rematch, which never came to fruition.

==== Ortiz vs. López ====
After Ortiz's scheduled rematch against Andre Berto fell through when Berto tested positive for a banned substance, his promotional team quickly found a late replacement in Josesito López. However, just days before the fight was scheduled to take place, Ortiz was announced as the opponent for Saúl Álvarez in the main event of a Pay-Per-View show entitled "Knockout Kings" scheduled for September 15, 2012, if he were to defeat López. Ortiz fought Lopez at the Staples Center in Los Angeles on June 23. In an exciting fight, both fighters repeatedly engaged in competitive exchanges, as opposed to the one-sided bout predicted by many members of the press. At the beginning of the tenth round, Ortiz's team threw in the towel when the fighter complained of a broken jaw, subsequently cancelling his possible bout with Álvarez. After the fight, Ortiz stated, "Josesito broke my jaw, I had my mouth open and he broke my jaw. I couldn't close my mouth. It happened early in the (ninth) round. The corner wanted me to continue but I just couldn't."

==== Ortiz vs. Collazo, Pérez ====
On January 30, 2014, Ortiz was defeated by Luis Collazo. Collazo landed a right hook to Ortiz in the last second of the second round which ended the match after the 10 count. Ortiz's promoter and president of Golden Boy Promotions, Oscar De La Hoya, encouraged Ortiz to retire by tweeting "I really feel @VICIOUSortiz should call it a day and enjoy his young life."

Despite the encouragement to retire from his former promoter Oscar De La Hoya, Ortiz fought Manuel Pérez on the undercard of the December 13, 2014, Amir Khan vs. Devon Alexander fight. Ortiz defeated Perez by TKO in the 3rd round. In the fight, Victor suffered a hand injury that required surgery to repair the problem. He would not be able to use his hand until July, when it fully healed. He expected to be back in the ring towards the end of 2015. Ortiz returned on PBC's December 12 preliminary undercard, at the AT&T Center in San Antonio, Texas, winning via eighth-round TKO over Gilberto Sanchez Leon.

==== Ortiz vs. Berto II ====
Five years after their first slugfest, Ortiz and Berto (30–4, 23 KOs) finally met in a rematch on April 30, 2016, at the StubHub Center in Carson, California. Berto was down once in round 2 but beat the count, and came on strong in the 4th round. Ortiz went down twice in the 4th round although he beat both counts, he didn't answer to referee Jack Reiss, who kept asking if he wants to continue. The referee stopped the bout after 1 minute and 44 seconds of the 4th round. Berto stated after the match that he would be willing to fight Ortiz a third time if he wanted to and then called out WBC Champion Danny Garcia.

==== Ortiz vs. Corral ====
On June 28, 2017, a deal was finalized for Ortiz's return bout against Mexican boxer Saul Corral (24-9, 15 KOs) in a scheduled 10 round fight to take place at the Rabobank Theater in Bakersfield, California, on July 30 and would headline a Premier Boxing Champions card. Ortiz made a successful comeback with a fourth round stoppage win over Corral. Ortiz stalked Corral from the opening round landing straight lefts and hooks, although Corral fought back, Ortiz did enough to win the early rounds. In round 3, referee Jack Reiss docked a point of Corral after warning him for holding Ortiz's left arm. In round 4, Ortiz landed a left hand that sent Corral down. He beat the count, but Ortiz pounced, forcing the referee to stop the fight after 1 minute and 26 seconds. Ortiz kept his options open when speaking in the post fight, “There are a lot of names out there in the welterweight division. At this point I’m going to let my team guide me, because I’ll always be ready for anybody.” He also praised Corral, “Corral is a great fighter who hits hard and I definitely felt it. Top of the line boxers like myself, we hang in there and we perform to the best of our abilities. It was my first time back in a while and it’s just the beginning.”

==== Ortiz vs. Alexander ====
It was first reported on December 29, 2017, that a deal was being worked out for Ortiz to fight fellow former two-weight world champion Devon Alexander (27-4, 14 KOs). On January 7, 2018, it was confirmed that the bout would take place on February 17 at the Don Haskins Center in El Paso, Texas, on free-to-air Fox. Ortiz and Alexander fought to a 12-round majority draw with one judge scoring it 115–113 for Ortiz and the remaining two scoring 114–114. The bout was closely contested in the first half of the fight, with Ortiz controlling more of the fight and landing the heavier shots. Many boxing outlets scored the fight in favor of Alexander. ESPN.co.uk had it 118–108 and Bad Left Hook scored the fight 117–111 for Alexander, as did CBS Sports. The broadcast team on fight night felt Alexander did enough to win. With the draw being the first on Alexander's record, he was open to a rematch, as was Ortiz, who had now had three draws. Ortiz said, "A rematch would be awesome. If both teams agree and the fans want it, let's make it happen." CompuBox Stats showed that Alexander landed 155 of 485 punches thrown (32%) and Ortiz landed 137 of his 550 (25%). The event averaged 1,136,000 viewers with the main event reaching 1.53 million viewers.

==== Cancelled John Molina Jr. ====
On August 23, 2018, PBC announced a special Sunday card would take on September 30 at the Citizens Business Bank Arena in Ontario, California. Ortiz would headline the card against 35 year old, former world title challenger John Molina Jr. (30-7, 24 KOs). The card would be broadcast live on FS1 and FOX Deportes. Ortiz made his intentions clear that he was aiming for a future world title opportunity. On September 25, Ortiz was being charged with multiple counts of sexual assault. A day later he was dropped from the card. It was rumored that Molina may still fight, however was not confirmed. A new main event was set which would see unbeaten featherweight Brandon Figueroa take on veteran Óscar Escandón in a 10-round bout.

== Professional boxing record ==
43 fights	33 wins	7 losses
By knockout	25	5
By decision	8	1
By disqualification	0	1
Draws	3	

No.	Result	Record	Opponent	Type	Round, time	Date	Location	Notes
43	Win	33–7–3	Todd Manuel	UD	10	May 21, 2022	Gila River Arena, Glendale, Arizona, U.S.	
42	Loss	32–7–3	Robert Guerrero	UD	10	Aug 21, 2021	T-Mobile Arena, Paradise, Nevada, U.S.	
41	Draw	32–6–3	Devon Alexander	MD	12	Feb 17, 2018	Don Haskins Center, El Paso, Texas, U.S.	
40	Win	32–6–2	Saul Corral	TKO	4 (10), 1:26	Jul 30, 2017	Rabobank Theater and Convention Center, Bakersfield, California, U.S.	
39	Loss	31–6–2	Andre Berto	KO	4 (12), 1:14	Apr 30, 2016	StubHub Center, Carson, California, U.S.	
38	Win	31–5–2	Gilberto Sanchez Leon	TKO	8 (10), 2:57	Dec 12, 2015	AT&T Center, San Antonio, Texas, U.S.	
37	Win	30–5–2	Manuel Pérez	TKO	3 (10), 0:51	Dec 13, 2014	MGM Grand Garden Arena, Paradise, Nevada, U.S.	
36	Loss	29–5–2	Luis Collazo	KO	2 (12), 2:59	Jan 30, 2014	Barclays Center, New York City, New York, U.S.	For WBA International welterweight title
35	Loss	29–4–2	Josesito López	RTD	9 (12), 3:00	Jun 23, 2012	Staples Center, Los Angeles, California, U.S.	For vacant WBC Silver welterweight title
34	Loss	29–3–2	Floyd Mayweather Jr.	KO	4 (12), 2:59	Sep 17, 2011	MGM Grand Garden Arena, Paradise, Nevada, U.S.	Lost WBC welterweight title
33	Win	29–2–2	Andre Berto	UD	12	Apr 16, 2011	Foxwoods Resort Casino, Ledyard, Connecticut, U.S.	Won WBC welterweight title
32	Draw	28–2–2	Lamont Peterson	MD	10	Dec 11, 2010	Mandalay Bay Events Center, Paradise, Nevada, U.S.	
31	Win	28–2–1	Vivian Harris	KO	3 (10), 0:45	Sep 18, 2010	Staples Center, Los Angeles, California, U.S.	
30	Win	27–2–1	Nate Campbell	UD	10	May 15, 2010	The Theater at Madison Square Garden, New York City, New York, U.S.	
29	Win	26–2–1	Hector Alatorre	TKO	10 (10), 0:51	Feb 25, 2010	Club Nokia, Los Angeles, California, U.S.	
28	Win	25–2–1	Antonio Díaz	RTD	7 (10), 0:01	Dec 12, 2009	UIC Pavilion, Chicago, Illinois, U.S.	
27	Loss	24–2–1	Marcos Maidana	TKO	6 (12), 0:46	Jun 27, 2009	Staples Center, Los Angeles, California, U.S.	For vacant WBA interim light welterweight title
26	Win	24–1–1	Mike Arnaoutis	TKO	2 (12), 1:27	Mar 7, 2009	HP Pavilion, San Jose, California, U.S.	Retained NABO light welterweight title Won USBA light welterweight title
25	Win	23–1–1	Jeffrey Resto	TKO	2 (12), 1:19	Dec 6, 2008	MGM Grand Garden Arena, Paradise, Nevada, U.S.	Retained NABO light welterweight title
24	Win	22–1–1	Roberto David Arrieta	TKO	5 (12), 2:25	Sep 13, 2008	MGM Grand Garden Arena, Paradise, Nevada, U.S.	Won vacant NABO light welterweight title
23	Win	21–1–1	Dairo Esalas	KO	5 (10), 2:31	May 3, 2008	Home Depot Center, Carson, California, U.S.	
22	Win	20–1–1	Carlos Maussa	KO	1 (10), 1:47	Nov 10, 2007	Madison Square Garden, New York City, New York, U.S.	
21	Win	19–1–1	Emmanuel Clottey	TKO	10 (10), 2:59	Aug 30, 2007	Grand Plaza Hotel, Houston, Texas, U.S.	
20	Win	18–1–1	Maximino Cuevas	KO	1 (10), 2:44	Jun 29, 2007	Cliff Castle Casino Hotel, Camp Verde, Arizona, U.S.	
19	Win	17–1–1	Tomas Barrientes	TKO	5 (8), 2:42	Apr 14, 2007	Alamodome, San Antonio, Texas, U.S.	
18	Draw	16–1–1	Marvin Cordova Jr.	TD	1 (8), 3:00	Jan 19, 2007	Dodge Arena, Phoenix, Arizona, U.S.	Ortiz cut from an accidental head clash
17	Win	16–1	Yahir Aguiar	KO	2 (6), 1:32	Nov 3, 2006	Palo Duro Creek Golf Club, Nogales, Arizona, U.S.	
16	Win	15–1	Alfred Kotey	UD	8	Sep 8, 2006	Gilley's Club, Pasadena, Texas, U.S.	
15	Win	14–1	Orlando Cantera	TKO	4 (8), 0:34	Jun 23, 2006	Palo Duro Creek Golf Club, Nogales, Arizona, U.S.	
14	Win	13–1	Freddie Barrera	TKO	1 (8), 2:42	Mar 31, 2006	Activities Center, Maywood, California, U.S.	
13	Win	12–1	Nestor Rosas	KO	5 (8), 2:06	Feb 10, 2006	Roseland Ballroom, San Antonio, Texas, U.S.	
12	Win	11–1	Leroy Fountain	KO	4 (8), 1:27	Jan 6, 2006	Santa Ana Star Casino, Bernalillo, New Mexico, U.S.	
11	Win	10–1	Donnell Logan	TKO	2 (4), 2:10	Nov 4, 2005	Ventura Theatre, Ventura, California, U.S.	
10	Win	9–1	Kevin Carmody	UD	6	Sep 9, 2005	Edgewater Hotel and Casino, Laughlin, Nevada, U.S.	
9	Win	8–1	Oliver Bolanos	UD	4	Aug 26, 2005	Colonial Ballroom, Houston, Texas, U.S.	
8	Loss	7–1	Corey Alarcon	DQ	1 (6), 2:59	Jun 3, 2005	Performing Arts Center, Oxnard, California, U.S.	Ortiz disqualified for hitting Alarcon after a knockdown
7	Win	7–0	Rodney Jones	TKO	2 (4), 1:34	Mar 5, 2005	Mandalay Bay Events Center, Paradise, Nevada, U.S.	
6	Win	6–0	Joel Ortega	TKO	1 (4), 1:32	Feb 11, 2005	Convention Center, San Diego, California, U.S.	
5	Win	5–0	Juan Patino	UD	4	Nov 26, 2004	Plaza Hotel & Casino, Las Vegas, Nevada, U.S.	
4	Win	4–0	Charles Hawkins	TKO	4 (4), 2:02	Oct 8, 2004	Edgewater Hotel and Casino, Laughlin, Nevada, U.S.	
3	Win	3–0	Lee De Leon	TKO	2 (4), 2:35	Sep 17, 2004	Plaza Hotel & Casino, Las Vegas, Nevada, U.S.	
2	Win	2–0	Alejandro Nungaray	UD	4	Jul 24, 2004	Flamingo Hilton, Laughlin, Nevada, U.S.	
1	Win	1–0	Raul Montes	TKO	1 (4), 2:01	Jun 4, 2004	Plaza Hotel & Casino, Las Vegas, Nevada, U.S.	

== Pay-per-view bouts ==
Date	Fight	Billing	Buys	Network	Revenue
September 17, 2011	Mayweather vs. Ortiz	Star Power	1,250,000	HBO	$78,440,000

== Exhibition boxing record ==
2 fights	0 wins	0 losses
No contests	1	
Non-scored	1	

No.	Result	Record	Opponent	Type	Round, time	Date	Location	Notes
2	NC	0–0 (1–1)	Jorge Páez Jr.	—N/a	10	Apr 18, 2025	Plaza de Toros Calafia, Mexicali, Mexico	Non-scored bout
1	—N/a	0–0 (1)	Rodrigo Coria	—N/a	8	Aug 24, 2024	Mexico City Arena, Mexico City, Mexico	Non-scored bout

== Bare-knuckle boxing ==
In March 2026, Ortiz signed an agreement to compete for BKB Bare Knuckle Boxing.

== Television ==
=== Dancing with the Stars ===
Ortiz participated on the sixteenth season of ABC's Dancing with the Stars. His professional partner was former So You Think You Can Dance competitor Lindsay Arnold. They were the fourth couple to be eliminated on the sixth week of competition.

Week #	Dance/Song	Judges' score			Result
Week #	Dance/Song	Inaba	Goodman	Tonioli	Result
1	Foxtrot / "Daylight"	6	6	6	No Elimination
2	Jive / "Runaway Baby"	6	6	6	Bottom Two
3	Prom Group Dance / "The Rockafeller Skank"; Contemporary / "Slow Dancing in a Burning Room"	Awarded; 8	0; 7	Points; 8	Safe
4	Paso Doble / "We Will Rock You"	6	6	6	Bottom Two
5	Viennese Waltz / "Never Tear Us Apart"	7	7	7	Bottom Two
6	Rumba / "I Just Called to Say I Love You"; Team Paso Doble / "Higher Ground"	6; 7	6; 8	6; 7	Eliminated

== Legal issues ==
Days before his September 30, 2018, bout against Molina, Ortiz was charged with multiple counts of sexual assault. He turned himself in to local authorities on September 25, according to the Oxnard Police Department. According to Ventura County Superior Court, the assaults took place in March 2018. His bail was set at $100,000. Sexual assault charges against Victor Ortiz were dismissed by prosecutors in December 2020 because they could not prove the charges beyond a reasonable doubt.

== Acting career ==
Victor Ortiz first appeared on screen as an actor in the action film The Expendables 3. He played the character of Mars, a young American soldier recruited onto the Expendables team.

Ortiz appeared in the sports drama film Southpaw, co-starring Jake Gyllenhaal, playing a young boxer named Ramone.

=== Filmography ===
Films
Year	Title	Role	Notes
2014	The Expendables 3	Mars	
2015	Southpaw	Ramone	
2017	Once Upon a Time in Venice	Chewy	

Television
Year	Title	Episode	Role	Notes
2014	The Eric Andre Show	"Jillian Barberie; Victor Ortiz"	Himself	
2016	Hawaii Five-0	"He Moho Hou" aka "New Player"	Juan Diego	
2016	Ray Donovan	"Marisol"	Whittaker	2 episodes

Sporting positions
Regional boxing titles
Vacant Title last held by Lamont Peterson	NABO light welterweight champion September 13, 2008 – June 2009; Vacated	Vacant Title next held by Juan Díaz
Preceded by Mike Arnaoutis	USBA light welterweight champion March 7, 2009 – June 2009; Vacated	Vacant Title next held by Tim Coleman
World boxing titles
Preceded by Andre Berto	WBC welterweight champion April 16, 2011 – September 17, 2011	Succeeded by Floyd Mayweather Jr.
Awards
Previous: Amir Khan	ESPN Prospect of the Year; 2008	Next: Daniel Jacobs
Previous: Giovani Segura vs. Iván Calderón	The Ring Fight of the Year vs. Andre Berto; 2011	Next: Juan Manuel Márquez vs. Manny Pacquiao IV
