= Baldomir =

Baldomir is a surname. Notable people with the surname include:

- Alfredo Baldomir (1884–1948), Uruguayan soldier, architect and politician
- Carlos Baldomir (born 1971), Argentine boxer

== See also ==
- Floyd Mayweather Jr. vs. Carlos Baldomir, boxing match for the World Boxing Council and The Ring (magazine)
