= Kostya Tszyu vs. Zab Judah =

Boxing match

The Fight to Unite
- Date: November 3, 2001
- Venue: MGM Grand Garden Arena, Paradise, Nevada, U.S.
- Title(s) on the line: WBA (Super), WBC, and IBF undisputed light welterweight titles

Tale of the tape
Boxer	Kostya Tszyu	Zab Judah
Nickname	Thunder from Down Under	Super
Hometown	Serov, Ural, Russia	Brooklyn, New York, U.S.
Purse	$1,500,000	$1,000,000
Pre-fight record	27–1 (1) (22 KO)	27–0 (1) (21 KO)
Age	32 years, 1 month	24 years
Height	5 ft 7 in (170 cm)	5 ft 7 in (170 cm)
Weight	140 lb (64 kg)	139 1/2 lb (63 kg)
Style	Orthodox	Southpaw
Recognition	WBA and WBC; Light Welterweight Champion	IBF; Light Welterweight Champion

Result
- Tszyu wins by 2nd-round technical knockout

Kostya Tszyu vs. Zab Judah, billed as The Fight to Unite, was a professional boxing match contested on November 3, 2001, for the WBA, WBC and IBF super lightweight titles.

== Background ==
A unification fight between Kostya Tszyu, who held both the WBA and WBC super lightweight titles, and Zab Judah, the IBF junior welterweight titlist, was put into motion in June 2001 after months of negotiations, with both Tszyu and Judah having both agreed to tentative contract arrangements to face each other later in the year. Before their expected title bout, both fighters would first appear on the same fight card on June 23 defending their respective titles against mandatory challengers, Oktay Urkal and Allan Vester. Tszyu would defeat Urkal by unanimous decision, while Judah would knockout Vester in the second round, after which it was announced that the Tszyu–Judah fight would take place on November 3, 2001, at the Mohegan Sun, though the venue was changed to the MGM Grand Garden Arena in the Las Vegas Valley in late September.

The winner of the fight would become the first undisputed champion in the light welterweight/super lightweight division since Takeshi Fuji in 1968 and the first three-belt undisputed champion in the division overall.

== The Fight ==
Judah got off the a good start in the first round, controlling the round after stunning Tszyu just past the one minute mark and then aggressively attacking Tszyu throughout forcing him to clinch to nullify Judah's attack. However, the fight would come to a sudden end in the second round. Judah took a more tentative approach in the second round, this time using constant movement and rarely engaging with Tszyu who served as the aggressor throughout the round while Judah kept his distance, throwing occasional jabs and combinations, but with only eight seconds, Tszyu caught Judah with a right hand and followed up with another that caught Judah flush as he retreated that sent Judah down to the canvas. Judah would get back up quickly but could not regain his footing and stumbled back down to the mat face first, after which referee Jay Nady immediately stopped the fight, giving Tszyu the victory by technical knockout with one second remaining in the round.

== Aftermath ==
Chaos ensued after the stoppage as an enraged Judah got back on his feet and vehemently protested Nady's decision eventually shoving Nady in the throat with his glove as Judah's father and trainer Yoel attempted to console and restrain his son. When decision was announced, Judah again flew into a rage, throwing a stool at Nady and had to again be restrained by his father, his manager Shelly Finkel and both members of the Las Vegas Metropolitan Police Department and MGM Grand Garden security.

After the fight, Judah complained that Nady had stopped the fight without giving him the standard 10-count that often accompanies a knockdown telling the media "Why did he stop the fight? He didn't even give me a count. This was wrong." When asked why he stopped the fight Nady replied that "The man was hurt. I had to protect the fighter. I was concerned he might get hurt after getting hit with a very powerful punch that appeared to render him momentarily unconscious."

About a month after the fight, the Nevada State Athletic Commission held a hearing and voted to suspend Judah six months and issued him a $75,000 fine for his post-fight actions. Judah commented that the decision was "fair" and explained that "emotions took over" as it "was more or less the biggest fight of my life."

== Fight card ==
Confirmed bouts:

Weight Class	Weight		vs.		Method	Round	Notes
Super Lightweight	140 lbs.	Kostya Tszyu (c)	def.	Zab Judah (c)	TKO	2/12	^{Note 1}
Bantamweight	118 lbs.	Pete Frissina	def.	Jorge Lacierva	SD	12/12	^{Note 2}
Super Lightweight	140 lbs.	Francisco Bojado	def.	Mauro Lucero	KO	1/10
Middleweight	160 lbs.	Kuvonchbek Toygonbaev	def.	Fidel Hernandez	TKO	8/10
Super Lightweight	140 lbs.	Vince Phillips	def.	Carlito Brosas	TKO	3/10
Super Welterweight	154 lbs.	Ted Limoz	def.	Ian MacKillop	TKO	3/6
Light Middleweight	154 lbs.	Muhammad Abdullaev	def.	Miguel Angel Ruiz	TKO	5/6

^Note 1 For WBA, WBC and IBF Super Lightweight title
^Note 2 For WBO NABO Bantamweight title

== Broadcasting ==
Country	Broadcaster
Australia	Main Event
United Kingdom	Sky Sports
United States	Showtime

Preceded by vs. Oktay Urkal	Kostya Tszyu's bouts 3 November 2001	Succeeded by vs. Ben Tackie
Preceded by vs. Allan Vester	Zab Judah's bouts 3 November 2001	Succeeded by vs. Omar Gabriel Weis
