= Floyd Mayweather Jr. vs. Zab Judah =

Boxing match

Sworn Enemies
- Date: April 8, 2006
- Venue: Thomas & Mack Center, Paradise, Nevada, U.S.
- Title(s) on the line: IBF and vacant IBO welterweight titles

Tale of the tape
Boxer	Zab Judah	Floyd Mayweather Jr.
Nickname	"Super"	"Pretty Boy"
Hometown	Brooklyn, New York, U.S.	Grand Rapids, Michigan, U.S.
Purse	$1,000,000	$5,000,000
Pre-fight record	34–3 (25 KO)	35–0 (24 KO)
Age	28 years, 5 months	29 years, 1 month
Height	5 ft 7 in (170 cm)	5 ft 8 in (173 cm)
Weight	145 1/2 lb (66 kg)	146 lb (66 kg)
Style	Southpaw	Orthodox
Recognition	IBF; Welterweight Champion; 2-division world champion	The Ring No. 1 ranked pound-for-pound fighter 3-division world champion

Result
- Mayweather Jr. wins via 12-round unanimous decision (116-112, 117-111, 119-109)

Floyd Mayweather Jr. vs. Zab Judah, billed as Sworn Enemies, was a boxing match for the IBF welterweight title which took place on April 8, 2006 at the Thomas and Mack Center in Paradise, Nevada between IBF welterweight champion Zab Judah and undefeated three-division champion Floyd Mayweather Jr.

== Background ==
With the loss to Carlos Manuel Baldomir, it appeared that Judah's much anticipated bout with Mayweather was off, but Judah's promoter Don King and Mayweather's promoter Bob Arum reworked the deals so the fight would go on. Mayweather was scheduled to earn a minimum $6 million while Judah was to earn $3 million plus a percentage of the profits, but because of Judah's loss, Mayweather earned a minimum $5 million while Judah was guaranteed $1 million plus a percentage of profits above $7 million. The fight took place on April 8, 2006, at the Thomas and Mack Center in Paradise, Nevada.

== The fight ==
Judah started strongly and put up a valiant fight, at times matching Mayweather's speed and punching precision. It appeared that Judah scored a knockdown in the second round when Mayweather's glove touched the canvas; however, referee Richard Steele ruled it a slip. In round four, Judah landed a left hand to the head that caused Mayweather to retreat to the ropes and cover up. The momentum changed in the fifth round, when Mayweather hurt Judah with a combination to the face. Then Mayweather landed a right hand on the bridge of Judah's nose, and blood began to flow. The seventh round was the most dominant for Mayweather to that point. Once again, he drew blood from Judah's nose. A combination from Mayweather backed Judah into a corner, and Judah's foot movement was considerably slower than it had been earlier in the fight.

With about 10 seconds left in the tenth round, Judah hit Mayweather with a low blow and followed it with a right hand to the back of Mayweather’s head. As Mayweather hopped around the ring in pain, Steele called time to give Mayweather a rest period. Mayweather’s uncle and trainer, Roger Mayweather, climbed into the ring, approached Judah and tried to confront him. Yoel Judah entered the ring and threw a punch at Roger. At that point, members of both fighters' camps entered the ring and an all-out melee ensued. More than a dozen security officers and police officers rushed into the ring and managed to control the situation, HBO Boxing announcer Jim Lampley said the riot was similar to the riot in the Riddick Bowe / Andrew Golota fight. After the ring was cleared, Roger Mayweather was ejected from the fight. Mayweather cruised through the last two rounds on his way to a unanimous decision victory by scores of 116–112, 117–111, and 119–109.

== Aftermath ==
After the fight, the purses for both fighters were withheld until video of the fight could be reviewed. Don King argued that Mayweather should have been disqualified because his uncle was the first person to enter the ring. At an April 13 hearing, the Nevada State Athletic Commission fined Roger Mayweather $200,000 and revoked his boxing license for one year. At a hearing on May 8, the Commission disciplined the other offenders in the melee. It fined Yoel Judah $100,000 and revoked his license for one year, fined Mayweather cornerman Leonard Ellerbe $50,000 and suspended his license for four months, and fined Zab Judah $350,000 and revoked his license for one year.

== Fight earnings ==
374,000 pay-per-view buys, $16.8 million in television revenue.

== Undercard ==
Confirmed bouts:

== Broadcasting ==
Country	Broadcaster
United States	HBO

Preceded by vs. Carlos Baldomir	Zab Judah's bouts April 8, 2006	Succeeded by vs. Rubén Galván
Preceded by vs. Sharmba Mitchell	Floyd Mayweather Jr.'s bouts April 8, 2006	Succeeded by vs. Carlos Baldomir
