= Courtney Burton =

American boxer

Personal information
- Born: Courtney Lee Burton; June 28, 1978 (age 48) Benton Harbor, Michigan, United States
- Height: 5 ft 7 in (170 cm)
- Weight: Lightweight

Boxing career
- Reach: 69 in (175 cm)
- Stance: Orthodox

Boxing record
- Wins: 22
- Win by KO: 11
- Losses: 7

Courtney Lee Burton (born June 28, 1978) is an American former professional boxer from Benton Harbor, Michigan. Throughout his career Burton was known as a switch-hitter being able to fight either orthodox or southpaw, he stood 5' 9" though many boxing records have him listed at 5' 7". He held the WBO NABO lightweight title.

== Early life ==
At the age of eight, Burton was involved in a street fight on the hard streets of Benton Harbor when three boys jumped on him in which one pulled out a bat and struck Burton across his back. Napoleon Lark (a local boxing trainer) was driving around in his car and spotted the fight and stopped it. Lark drove Burton home and asked Burton would he like to learn how to defend himself and Burton agreed. Courtney began competing in amateur boxing, and Lark and his wife Thelma eventually became Courtney and his younger brother's legal guardians.

== Amateur career ==
Burton was an amateur boxer, winning the Silver Gloves competition three times, the Junior Olympics back to back (in 1993 at 139 lbs. and 1994 at 147 lbs.), he was a two time International World Champion, and in 1994 he won the 156 lbs. title and was voted the "Outstanding Boxer of the Event" at the World Championships in Germany. He finished his amateur career with a record of (87-4) although he states he had a lot more fights as an amateur and had a career record of (139-16).

== Professional career ==
Burton began his professional career only 3 weeks after his 18th birthday in 1996 against Sam Mahmoud in Waukegan, Illinois, Burton won by majority decision. After his debut fight Burton would quit boxing for a while due to his longtime trainer and father-figure Napoleon Lark convincing Burton to go back to school and receive his G.E.D., after Burton dropped out of high school when he was 16 (in which at the time he had quit boxing too.) Burton agreed to do so and completed his schooling and returned to the ring 3 years later in 1999 and faced Nelson Hernandez at the Civic Center in La Porte, Indiana, Burton won by unanimous decision.

Burton would go on to win 14 of his next 15 fights with one being a no contest before losing his first fight to Eleazar Contreras Jr. in Louisiana, Burton was knocked out in the 5th round after being knocked down five times in the fight. In his next fight in February 2003, he knocked out Tomas Barrientes in the 1st round and knocked out ex-champion Gabriel Ruelas a month later. He then faced veteran and Indiana native Angel Manfredy on July 29, 2003 at the Civic Center in Hammond, Indiana. Burton floored Manfredy in the 7th round and knocked him out in the 8th round, this would become Burton's most glorified and celebrated victory of his career. After beating Manfredy in his backyard Burton immediately shot up in the ranks, during the post fight interview Courtney called out Floyd Mayweather Jr. on the nationally televised fight. His next bout he faced Francisco Lorenzo in the U.S. Virgin Islands for the vacant WBO NABO Lightweight title. The fight was promoted by legend Sugar Ray Leonard after the great seen Burton's previous breakthrough victory over Angel Manfredy, Burton struggled with Lorenzo but edged his way to a split decision victory.

== Decline ==
In his next fights he would hit a hiatus, he was knocked out by Julio Diaz in 2004 in an IBF title eliminator in the 11th round, and would win a highly disputed bout against Emanuel Augustus in which many critics felt Augustus was robbed due to Augustus outboxing Burton throughout the whole fight and leading tremendously on compubox after the fight, and because the bout was in Burton's home state of Michigan. He lost a grueling match against Ebo Elder on Showtime which by many was one of the greatest fights ever showcased on Showtime's network, Elder knocked out Burton in the last round of their 12 round bout (after this bout Burton ended his relationship with his longtime trainer Napoleon Lark.) He lost his next three fights by knockout as well to Rolando Reyes, Juan Lazcano, and Emanuel Augustus (in their second fight, in which Augustus earned his revenge.)

== Retirement ==
Burton retired from boxing in 2006 after his loss to Emanuel Augustus in their second fight after being knocked out five times in his previous six fights. Courtney made a short comeback to boxing at the end of February 2010, and beat Angel Hernandez by split decision. In his last fight he fought Detroit's Vernon Paris; Burton lost by unanimous decision though many felt he won. Burton ended his career with a record of 22–7 with 11 knockouts and 1 no-contest. During his professional career Burton won the NABO Lightweight title and was a two-time Indiana State Boxing Champion at Lightweight and Welterweight.

== Personal life ==
Burton lives in his hometown of Benton Harbor, Michigan, he is married, and also has a son from his ex-wife named Courtney Burton Jr. (born in 2000.)

== Professional boxing record ==
28 fights	21 wins	7 losses
By knockout	11	6
By decision	10	1
Draws	0	
