= Emanuel Augustus =

American boxer

Emanuel Tarot Francis Augustus
Personal information
- Nickname: YA
- Born: Emanuel Burton; January 2, 1975 (age 51) Chicago, Illinois, U.S.
- Height: 5 ft 7 in (170 cm)
- Weight: Light welterweight

Boxing career
- Reach: 68 in (173 cm)
- Stance: Orthodox

Boxing record
- Total fights: 78
- Wins: 38
- Win by KO: 20
- Losses: 34
- Draws: 6

Emanuel Augustus (born Emanuel Ya'kov Burton, January 2, 1975) is an American former professional boxer from Brownsville, Texas who competed from 1994 to 2011. He was known for his entertaining boxing style and showboating manner designed to confuse opponents. He faced top-level competition throughout his career, winning the IBA light welterweight title in 2004. He also had The Ring magazine's 2001 Fight of the Year vs. Micky Ward.

== Early life ==
Born in Chicago, Illinois, Augustus (born as Burton) At a young age Augustus moved to Baton Rouge, Louisiana after spending multiple years in the foster care system.

At the age of 17, Burton found a trainer by the name of Frank James, who operated a gym in Baton Rouge, Louisiana. During his time at the gym Augustus would go on to meet two of the best friends James Georgetown and LJ Morvant. Morvant would later state “in the gym nobody could beat him. He'd go through the whole gym and still be the man in the middle of the ring just wishing somebody would give him another round. He just never got enough.” Augustus had 27 Amateur bouts before going pro.

Augustus who was born with the last name Burton took his father's last name Augustus in 2001, after his parents married.

== Professional career ==
Augustus began boxing at age 17 under his birth name Emanuel Burton. In 1974, when his parents married, Burton adopted his father's last name of Augustus. He retained the nickname "YA", short for his middle name Ya'kov. Emanuel has frequently appeared on ESPN2's boxing programs Tuesday Night Fights and its counterpart Friday Night Fights.

Throughout his early career Augustus would mainly fight in the Southern United States. He had his first international fight on June 1, 1997, in Germany in a DQ loss to Stephen Smith. After going on a 4-fight losing streak in 1997–98 he would then hit the longest unbeaten run of his career of 10 fights. This would include Augustus flying out to Denmark on three days' notice to fight a 38–1 contender Soren Sondergaard, getting awarded a draw after knocking him down twice in the 8th. Then even more impressively just 10 days later he flew to England and beat Jon Thaxton by TKO to win both the IBF and WBO Inter-Continental Light titles.

Augustus's televised bouts garnered him a cult following, in part due to his unique style and flair in the ring, and his willingness to take on all comers, taking fights on short notice as a last minute replacement even in opponents' hometowns. Augustus frequently clowned in the ring to frustrate his opponents, engaging in his trademark "string-puppet dance." Augustus was also known for losing close controversial decisions on the road.

In 2000, Augustus fought Floyd Mayweather. Mayweather won, but with significant difficulty. Mayweather later said that Augustus gave him the most difficult fight in his entire career.

On July 13, 2001, Augustus would face Micky Ward in the 2001 fight of the year. The majority of the fight saw the two men standing right in front of each other. Ward was able to walk Augustus against the ropes for a good portion of the bout, where Augustus was more than comfortable exchanging punches. The fight was pure chaotic, non-stop carnage with both fighters throwing punches to the point of exhaustion.

Augustus achieved a measure of fame after his bout against Courtney Burton on July 6, 2004, which he lost by controversial close decision. The state of Michigan investigated the points verdict for Burton, but did not overturn the result. Augustus demanded a rematch, and got it, avenging his loss to Burton on September 1, 2006, when he stopped Burton in the eighth round on ESPN with the help of a left hook to the body. This was the opposite of result in their first fight, when Augustus was disallowed a knockdown from a left hook to the body after referee Dan Kelley incorrectly claimed the knockdown was a caused by an illegal low blow. The punch should have been permitted, because it actually landed on Burton's beltline, which is termed 'the border' in professional boxing refereeing.

The best win of Augustus' career ratings wise was against Carlos Wilfredo Vilches on July 19, 2002. Augustus took the fight on just 2 days' notice after Vilches' original opponent, Vince Phillips, pulled out due to injury. Vilches was 37–1–2 at the time and was a ranked fighter. During the bout, Vilches wanted to keep Augustus at bay with a stiff jab. Augustus continued to pressure Vilches, and landed counter right hands over the top of Vilches' left jab. A cut opened up near the left eye of Vilches, which eventually resulted in an upset eighth round stoppage win for Augustus. The win vaulted Augustus to the number two worldwide ratings position in the International boxing Federation light welterweight division. However, Augustus followed with four decision losses and one controversial draw to tough opponents, including Omar Gabriel Weis, over whom Vilches already held a victory.

After getting a draw vs 16–0 Alvaro Aguilar. Augustus would win his first world title on April 2, 2004, when he challenged IBA World Super Lightweight champion Alex Trujillo. Augustus would win the title by a 12-round unanimous decision.

2 years later in 2006 coming off back to back wins, Augustus would challenge Russell Stoner Jones for the vacant WBC Continental Americans super lightweight title. Augustus would win the belt in a dominant unanimous decision, winning all ten rounds on all 3 judges score cards.

At least one of Augustus' losses was questionable. On June 6, 1999, Danish boxer Allan Vester won his bout with Augustus with one second left in the twelfth and final round. Augustus was knocked down by a flurry of punches which occurred in the final seconds of the bout, and did not get up in time. Augustus later admitted he gave up out of frustration near the end of the bout, stating, "I just felt out of order, out of place." Due to Augustus not being afraid to fight anyone any time anywhere this led to him losing numerous controversial decisions when he would fight fighters in their home town. He is often regarded as one of the most robbed fighters in boxing.

Near the end of his career in 2008, Augustus had a three win fight streak, including a KO victory of Jakkirt Suwunnalirt to win the WBO oriental welterweight title. This would be the last title win of his career, as he would return to the United States and lose his next 5 retiring in 2011.

== Titles ==
After going on a 7 fight unbeaten streak he traveled to Norwich, Norfolk, U.K. on September 26, 1998, to take on British fighter Jon Thaxton, ending in a TKO victory in the 7th round to win both the WBO Inter-Continental Light Welterweight Championship and the IBF Inter-Continental Light Welterweight Championship.

On April 2, 2004, Augustus became the IBA light welterweight champion defeating Alex Trujillo by unanimous decision.

On December 9, 2006, he became the WBC Continental Americas light welterweight champion by defeating Russell Stoner Jones.

On July 4, 2008, he knocked out Jakkirt Suwunnalirt in Sydney, Australia, to win the WBO Oriental welterweight title.

=== Controversial disqualification ===
Augustus was the IBA light welterweight champion between April 2, 2004, and June 18 of that year. Augustus lost his title when referee Laurence Cole disqualified him in his first title defense against Tomas Barrientes. At the time of disqualification, Augustus was ahead on all three judges' scorecards. He was disqualified for pushing, talking back to the referee, and not looking into his eyes when asked to.

== Other achievements ==
His fight against "Irish" Micky Ward on July 13, 2001, was voted 2001 ESPN "Fight of the Year", USA Today's fight of the year, as well as 2001 Ring magazine Fight of the Year. In June 2008 ESPN announced that this fight had been nominated for its "Fight of the Decade" award. Augustus was also named "ESPN's Most Memorable Fighter".

== Boxing Style ==
Augustus is known for his unorthodox style. He would routinely dance in the ring, including his trademark string-puppet dance. He would often start out his fights with a shoulder shimmy he would then shift his weight onto his right foot while sweeping his left glove low across the front of his body. He would repeat the motion to the opposite side, transferring his weight to his left foot and swinging his right glove in a similarly low, cross-body arc.

Yet Emanuel was also known for his incredible defense, routinely slipping punches and using shoulder rolls to avoid punches. Augustus used exceptional conventional footwork, but also used unorthodox footwork. As his opponents moved in to attack, Augustus often flicked his feet toward them in a motion similar to Muhammad Ali's shuffle while leaning his upper body dramatically backward. His unpredictable movement gave him an almost cartoon like appearance. When opponents hesitated to throw punches a common occurrence Augustus would sometimes place both gloves behind his back and rock from side to side with his chin extended toward them, openly inviting them to strike. The routine resembled a playful balancing act more than a traditional boxing stance. According to Emanuel's long-time friend LJ Morvant, many of his unorthodox techniques came from characters in the video game Tekken.

His fighting style would lead to him earning the Nickname "The Drunken Master." However Augustus himself was not a fan of the nickname stating in an interview:

It was the media that started with all The Drunken Master bullshit, That wasn’t me. I never called myself that. I just wanted to entertain people. If you were watching me fight, I wanted to give you your money’s worth.

During a 2012 interview with boxing expert Dan Rafael, Floyd Mayweather Jr. stated Augustus was the toughest opponent he had faced in his career and Augustus's record didn't reflect the fighter's skills.

== Outside the ring ==
On the night of October 13, 2014, Augustus was critically wounded after being hit in the back of the head by a random gunshot and was on life support. Baton Rouge Police named 21-year-old Christopher Stills as a suspect in the crime, but subsequently dropped charges due to lack of witnesses or evidence of intent, as Stills was alleged to have fired a gun several times in the air but not at a target. Augustus eventually recovered, and was living with his sister in Baton Rouge. As of 2016, Augustus was engaged to be married, was in improved health and spirits, and had returned in training.

In August 2025, Augustus was added into the boxing video game Undisputed as DLC.

== Professional boxing record ==
78 fights	38 wins	34 losses
By knockout	20	5
By decision	18	27
By disqualification	0	2
Draws	6	

No.	Result	Record	Opponent	Type	Round, time	Date	Location	Notes
78	Loss	38–34–6	(United States) Vernon Paris	UD	8	29 Jan 2011	(United States) Silverdome, Pontiac, Michigan, U.S.	
77	Loss	38–33–6	(United States) Charles Hatley	UD	8	25 Sep 2010	(United States) Quick Trip Ballpark, Grand Prairie, Texas, U.S.	
76	Loss	38–32–6	(Russia) Ruslan Provodnikov	TKO	9 (10)	21 May 2010	(United States) Laredo Energy Arena, Laredo, Texas, U.S.	
75	Loss	38–31–6	(Nigeria) Wale Omotoso	TKO	9 (10)	21 Aug 2009	Knox Netball Centre, Ferntree Gully, Victoria, Australia	
74	Loss	38–30–6	(United States) Francisco Figueroa	SD	8	8 Nov 2008	(United States) Madison Square Garden, New York City, New York, U.S.	Undercard fight for the main event Joe Calzaghe vs. Roy Jones Jr.
73	Win	38–29–6	(Thailand) Jakkirt Suwunnalirt	KO	2 (12)	4 July 2008	Bowman Centre, Blacktown, Sydney, New South Wales, Australia	
72	Win	37–29–6	(Philippines) Jun Paderna	UD	6	30 May 2008	Central Coast Rugby League Club, Gosford, New South Wales, Australia	
71	Win	36–29–6	(Australia) David Wiremu	KO	2 (8)	1 Feb 2008	Inglis Auctions Complex, Randwick, New South Wales, Sydney, Australia	
70	Loss	35–29–6	(Russia) Sergey Sorokin	UD	12	31 Aug 2007	Yubileyny, Yugorsk, Khanty-Mansi Autonomous Okrug, Russia	For WBO Asia Pacific Super Lightweight Title
69	Win	35–28–6	(United States) Marteze Logan	UD	8	18 Apr 2007	(United States) Ameristar Casino, Kansas City, Missouri, U.S.	
68	Loss	34–28–6	(Kyrgyzstan) Almazbek Raiymkulov	UD	10	11 Jan 2007	(United States) New Alhambra, Philadelphia, Pennsylvania, U.S.	
67	Win	34–27–6	(Ghana) Russell Stoner Jones	UD	10	9 Dec 2006	(United States) Alltel Arena, North Little Rock, Arkansas, U.S.	Won vacant WBC Continental Americas Super Lightweight Title
66	Win	33–27–6	(United States) Courtney Burton	KO	8 (10)	1 Sep 2006	(United States) Million Dollar Elm Casino, Tulsa, Oklahoma, U.S.	
65	Win	32–27–6	(United States) Marteze Logan	UD	8	17 May 2006	(United States) Mohegan Sun Casino, Uncasville, Connecticut, U.S.	
64	Loss	31–27–6	(Mexico) Arturo Morua	UD	12	10 Mar 2006	(United States) Desert Diamond Casino, Tucson, Arizona, U.S.	For WBO Inter-Continental Super Lightweight Title
63	Win	31–26–6	(Colombia) Jaime Rangel	TKO	10 (10)	10 Feb 2006	(United States) Foxwoods Resort, Ledyard, Mashantucket Pequot Tribe, Connecticut, U.S.	
62	Loss	30–26–6	(Canada) Herman Ngoudjo	UD	12	15 Oct 2005	Montreal Casino, Montreal, Quebec, Canada	For NABF Super Lightweight Title and vacant WBC International Super Lightweight Title
61	Win	30–25–6	(United States) Ray Oliveira	TKO	8 (10)	8 Jul 2005	(United States) Hampton Beach Casino, Hampton Beach, New Hampshire, U.S.	
60	Win	29–25–6	(Guyana) Dillon Carew	TKO	8 (10)	21 Jan 2005	(United States) Mohegan Sun, Uncasville, Connecticut, U.S.	Corner retirement~Carew deducted 2 points for spitting out his mouthpiece in the 8th rd
59	Loss	28–25–6	(United States) Courtney Burton	SD	10	6 Jul 2004	(United States) L.C. Walker Arena, Muskegon, Michigan, U.S.	Augustus penalized one point in 8th for spinning himself out of a clinch
58	Loss	28–24–6	(United States) Tomas Barrientes	DQ	7 (12)	18 Jun 2004	(United States) Dodge Arena, Hidalgo, Texas, U.S.	For IBA Light Welterweight Title, Lost IBA World Super Lightweight Title, Augustus ahead at time of disqualification
57	Win	28–23–6	(Puerto Rico) Alex Trujillo	UD	12	2 Apr 2004	(United States) Desert Diamond Casino, Tucson, Arizona, U.S.	Won IBA World Super Lightweight Title
56	Draw	27–23–6	(Mexico) Alvaro Aguilar	MD	8	28 Feb 2004	(United States) MGM Grand, Las Vegas, Nevada, U.S.	Undercard fight for the main event Érik Morales vs Jesús Chávez
55	Loss	27–23–5	(United States) David Diaz	UD	8	30 Jan 2004	(United States) DePaul Athletic Center, Chicago, Illinois, U.S.	
54	Loss	27–22–5	(Brazil) Kelson Pinto	UD	10	17 Jun 2003	(United States) Sundance Square, Fort Worth, Texas, U.S.	
53	Loss	27–21–5	(United States) Michael Warrick	UD	10	17 May 2003	(United States) Thunderbird Wild West Casino, Norman, Oklahoma, U.S.	
52	Loss	27–20–5	(Argentina) Omar Gabriel Weis	UD	10	7 Feb 2003	(United States) Sam's Town Hotel, Las Vegas, Nevada, U.S.	
51	Win	27–19–5	(Argentina) Carlos Wilfredo Vilches	TKO	8 (10)	19 Jul 2002	(United States) Yakama Legends Casino, Toppenish, Washington, U.S.	Fight stopped due to a cut, Augustus took the fight on 2 days notice as a late sub for Vince Phillips
50	Draw	26–19–5	(United States) Leavander Johnson	SD	10	7 Jun 2002	(United States) Rawhide Arena, Scottsdale, Arizona, U.S.	
49	Win	26–19–4	(Mexico) Luis Alejandro Ugalde	UD	8	12 Apr 2002	(United States) Saint Paul, Minnesota, U.S.	
48	Win	25–19–4	(United States) Jesus Abel Santiago	TKO	8 (10)	31 Jan 2002	(United States) Roy Wilkins Auditorium, Saint Paul, Minnesota, U.S.	
47	Loss	24–19–4	(Romania) Leonard Doroftei	UD	10	28 Sep 2001	(United States) War Memorial Gymnasium, San Francisco, California, U.S.	
46	Loss	24–18–4	(United States) Micky Ward	UD	10	13 Jul 2001	(United States) Casino Ballroom, Hampton Beach, New Hampshire, U.S.	
45	Win	24–17–4	(United States) Mike Griffith	TKO	10 (10)	16 Feb 2001	(United States) Grays Armory, Cleveland, Ohio, U.S.	
44	Win	23–17–4	(United States) Orlando Milian	TKO	2 (6)	10 Feb 2001	(United States) Miccosukee Resort & Gaming, Miami, Florida, U.S.	
43	Loss	22–17–4	(United States) Floyd Mayweather Jr.	TKO	9 (10)	21 Oct 2000	(United States) Cobo Hall, Detroit, Michigan, U.S.	
42	Win	22–16–4	(United States) Gerald Gray	UD	8	12 Aug 2000	(United States) Miccosukee Resort & Gaming, Miami, Florida, U.S.	
41	Loss	21–16–4	(Puerto Rico) John John Molina	UD	10	12 May 2000	(United States) Miccosukee Resort & Gaming, Miami, Florida, U.S.	
40	Loss	21–15–4	(Jamaica) Teddy Reid	UD	12	19 Mar 2000	(United States) Horseshoe Casino Tunica, Tunica Resorts, Mississippi, U.S.	For vacant NABF World Super Lightweight Title
39	Loss	21–14–4	(Mexico) Antonio Díaz	UD	12	17 Sep 1999	(United States) All American Sports Park, Las Vegas, Nevada, U.S.	For IBA World Super Lightweight Title
38	Won	21–13–4	(United States) Terrell Finger	KO	8 (8)	30 Jul 1999	(United States) Grand Casino, Biloxi, Mississippi, U.S.	
37	Loss	20–13–4	(Denmark) Allan Vester	KO	12 (12)	25 Jun 1999	Botanisk Have, Aarhus, Denmark	Lost IBF and WBO Inter-Continental light welterweight title
36	Win	20–12–4	(United States) Jamar Carter	UD	8	19 Feb 1999	(United States) Grand Casino, Biloxi, Mississippi, U.S.	
35	Win	19–12–4	(United States) Sammy Sparkman	KO	5 (?)	2 Dec 1998	(United States) New Orleans, Louisiana, U.S.	
34	Win	18–12–4	(United Kingdom) Jon Thaxton	TKO	7 (12)	26 Sep 1998	(United Kingdom) Sports Village, Norwich, Norfolk, U.K.	Won IBF and WBO Inter-Continental light welterweight title
33	Win	17–12–4	(Mexico) Eduardo Martinez	KO	6 (?)	16 Sep 1998	(United States) New Orleans, Louisiana, U.S.	
32	Draw	16–12–4	(Denmark) Søren Søndergaard	PTS	8	4 Sep 1998	Kolding Hallen, Kolding, Denmark	
31	Win	16–12–3	(Slovakia) Jozef Kubovsky	UD	6	28 Jun 1998	Germany	
30	Win	15–12–3	(United States) Fredd Ladd	TKO	8 (10)	7 May 1998	(United States) Sams Town Casino, Tunica, Mississippi, U.S.	
29	Win	14–12–3	(United States) Santos Lopez	KO	3 (8)	17 Apr 1998	(United States) Blue Horizon, Philadelphia, Pennsylvania, U.S.	
28	Win	13–12–3	(United States) Louie Leija	UD	8	10 Mar 1998	(United States) Casino Rouge, Baton Rouge, Louisiana, U.S.	
27	Win	12–12–3	(United States) David Toledo	KO	10 (10)	21 Feb 1998	(United States) Miccosukee Indian Gaming Resort Casino, Miami Florida, U.S	
26	Loss	11–12–3	(Puerto Rico) Juan Gomez	UD	10	31 Jan 1998	(United States) Ice Palace, Tampa Florida, U.S.	
25	Loss	11–11–3	(Puerto Rico) Silverio Flores	UD	8	14 Dec 1997	Fajardo, Puerto Rico	
24	Loss	11–10–3	(Puerto Rico) Juan Antonio Lopez	UD	8	14 Nov 1997	(United States) South Padre Island Texas, U.S.	
23	Loss	11–9–3	(Cuba) Diosbelys Hurtado	UD	10	2 Oct 1997	(United States) Miccosukee Indian Gaming Resort Casino, Miami Florida, U.S.	
22	Win	11–8–3	(United States) Danny Acevedo	TKO	5 (6)	13 Jul 1997	(United States) Grand Casino, Biloxi, Mississippi, U.S.	
21	Loss	10–8–3	(United Kingdom) Stephen Smith	DQ	3 (10)	1 Jun 1997	Riesa, Germany	Augustus disqualified for a low blow
20	Loss	10–7–3	(United States) Terrance Churchwell	UD	10	14 May 1997	(United States) Municipal Auditorium, Nashville, Tennessee U.S	
19	Win	10–6–3	(United States) Dezi Ford	UD	6	26 Feb 1997	(United States) Municipal Auditorium, Nashville, Tennessee U.S	
18	Win	9–6–3	(Puerto Rico) Wilfredo Negron	MD	8	19 Nov 1996	Ponce, Puerto Rico	
17	Draw	8–6–3	(United States) Arturo Ramos	PTS	6	28 Sep 1996	(United States) Will Rogers Coliseum, Fort Worth, Texas, U.S.	
16	Loss	8–6–2	(United States) Ivan Robinson	UD	10	21 Jul 1996	(United States) Teamster's Hall, Baltimore, Maryland, U.S.	
15	Draw	8–5–2	(United States) Larry O'Shields	PTS	6	23 Apr 1996	(United States) Youth Center, Cut Off, Louisiana, U.S.	
14	Loss	8–5–1	(United States) Pete Taliaferro	UD	10	4 Mar 1996	(United States) Mobile, Alabama, U.S.	
13	Win	8–4–1	(United States) Danny Reyes	UD	4	23 Jan 1996	(United States) Grand Casino, Biloxi, Mississippi, U.S.	
12	Win	7–4–1	(United States) Roberto Chala	TKO	6 (6)	12 Dec 1995	(United States) Horma, Louisiana, U.S.	
11	Loss	6–4–1	(United States) Lupe Miranda	UD	8	14 Sep 1995	(United States) La Villita Assembly Hall, San Antonio, Texas, U.S.	
10	Loss	6–3–1	(Mexico) Jesus Chavez	TKO	7 (8)	20 Jun 1995	(United States) Will Rogers Coliseum, Fort Worth, Texas, U.S.	
9	Draw	6–2–1	(United States) Bill Coddlington	MD	6	14 Mar 1995	(United States) Pontchatain Center, Kenner, Louisiana, U.S.	
8	Win	6–2	(United States) Barry Guidry	PTS	6	5 Mar 1995	(United States) Thibodaux Louisiana, U.S.	
7	Loss	5–2	(United States) Ed Tobar	MD	6	31 Jan 1995	(United States) La Villita Assembly Hall, San Antonio, Texas, U.S.	
6	Win	5–1	(United States) Barry Guidry	TKO	4 (6)	10 Jan 1995	(United States) Pontchatain Center, Kenner, Louisiana, U.S.	
5	Win	4–1	(United States) Richard Armstrong	PTS	6	3 Dec 1994	(United States) Horma, Louisiana, U.S.	
4	Win	3–1	(United States) Teddy Randolph	MD	6	30 Nov 1994	(United States) New Orleans, Louisiana, U.S.	
3	Win	2–1	(United States) David Herrod	PTS	6	18 Nov 1994	(United States) Baker, Louisiana, U.S.	
2	Loss	1–1	(United States) Eldon Sneed	UD	6	13 Oct 1994	(United States) Houston, Texas, U.S.	
1	Win	1–0	(United States) Jamie Cooper	UD	6	23 Jul 1994	(United States) Cajun Hall, Baton Rouge, Louisiana, U.S.	

=== Notable opponents ===
- In just his 10th professional fight faced Jesus Chavez and was TKO'd in the 7th round.
- Lost a 10-round UD against Pete Taliaferro.
- Took a short notice fight against Ivan Robinson and almost threw off Robinson's title aspirations (L10).
- Won a tight MD over Wilfredo Negron.
- Fought Diosbelys Hurtado on short notice (L10).
- TKO'd England's Jon Thaxton after taking the fight on short notice.
- Lost a 12-round decision to Antonio Diaz.
- Lost a controversial 12-round decision to Teddy Reid.
- Fought John John Molina (L10).
- TKO'd by Floyd Mayweather Jr. in the 9th round after his corner threw in the towel. Mayweather maintains to this day that Augustus was one of his toughest opponents.
- Took part in 2001's fight of the year against Micky Ward (L10). Ward maintains that Augustus, along with Arturo Gatti, was one of the toughest men he ever fought.
- Fought Romania's Leonard Doroftei (aka Leo Dorin, L10).
- Drew with the late Leavander Johnson.
- Upset Carlos Wilfredo Vilches with a TKO win.
- Lost a 10-round decision to Omar Weis.
- Lost a 10-round decision to Kelson Pinto on short notice.
- Lost an 8-round decision to David Diaz.
- Dominated in a 12-round win over Alex Trujillo.
- Stopped Ray Oliveira in 8 rounds.
- Lost an exciting 12-round UD to Herman Ngoudjo.
- Took a short notice fight against hard hitting prospect Ruslan Provodnikov and was TKO'd in the 9th round.
- Lost to Vernon Paris (L8) in his last ever fight.

Awards and achievements
Vacant Title last held by Jon Thaxton	WBO Inter-Continental Light Welterweight Champion; September 26, 1998 – May 29, 1999; Vacated	Vacant Title next held by Ricky Hatton
Vacant Title last held by Jon Thaxton	IBF Inter-Continental Light Welterweight Champion; September 26, 1998 – June 25, 1999	Succeeded by Allan Vester
Vacant Title last held by Alex Trujillo	IBA Light Welterweight Champion; April 2, 2004 – June 18, 2004	Succeeded by Tomas Barrientes
Vacant Title last held by Paulie Malignaggi	WBC Continental Americas Light Welterweight Champion; December 9, 2006 – October 5, 2007; Vacated	Vacant Title next held by Michel Rosales
Preceded by None	WBO Oriental Welterweight Champion; July 4, 2008 – May 17, 2009; Vacated	Vacant Title next held by Samuel Colomban
