= Josiah Judah =

American boxer

Personal information
- Nickname: Gorilla
- Nationality: American
- Born: Josiah Judah; August 21, 1978 (age 48) Brooklyn, New York, U.S.
- Height: 6 ft 1 in (185 cm)
- Weight: Light heavyweight

Boxing career
- Stance: Orthodox

Boxing record
- Total fights: 12
- Wins: 10
- Win by KO: 2
- Losses: 1
- Draws: 1

Josiah Judah (born August 21, 1978) is an American former professional boxer.

He is the brother of welterweight champion Zab Judah and former U.S. Boxing Association light heavyweight champion Daniel Judah. Judah has fought on the undercard of brother Zab Judah's fights. His trainer is his father, Yoel Judah.

== Miscellaneous ==
Judah and his family are Black Hebrew Israelites, who declared themselves as "Jewish".

== Professional boxing record ==
12 fights	10 wins	1 loss
By knockout	2	1
By decision	8	0
Draws	1	

No.	Result	Record	Opponent	Type	Round, time	Date	Location	Notes
12	Win	10–1–1	(Poland) Rafal Jastrzebski	MD	6	2011-07-23	(United States) Mandalay Bay Resort & Casino, Las Vegas, Nevada, USA	
11	Loss	9–1–1	(United States) Don Mouton	TKO	1 (6), 1:42	2008-07-05	(United States) Planet Hollywood Las Vegas, Las Vegas, Nevada, USA	
10	Win	9–0–1	(United States) Richmond Dalphone	UD	6	2007-09-07	(United States) Hard Rock Casino, Biloxi, Mississippi, USA	
9	Win	8–0–1	(United States) Michael Rush	TKO	3 (6)	2007-07-14	(United States) Fitzgeralds Casino & Hotel Tunica, Tunica, Mississippi, USA	
8	Win	7–0–1	(United States) Anthony Bowman	UD	6	2006-11-18	(United States) Fitzgeralds Casino & Hotel Tunica, Tunica, Mississippi, USA	
7	Draw	6–0–1	(United States) Guadalupe Acosta	TD	3 (4), 0:49	2006-07-11	(United States) The Hollywood Roosevelt Hotel, Los Angeles, California, USA	TD after Judah was cut from an accidental headbutt in round 2.
6	Win	6–0	(United States) Norman Johnson	UD	4	2006-07-08	(United States) Fitzgeralds Casino & Hotel Tunica, Tunica, Mississippi, USA	
5	Win	5–0	(United States) Frank Armstrong	UD	4	2006-01-07	(United States) Madison Square Garden, New York City, New York, USA	
4	Win	4–0	(United States) Adam Stewart	SD	4	2005-08-13	(United States) United Center, Chicago, Illinois, USA	
3	Win	3–0	(Canada) Daniel Stanislavjevic	SD	4	May 14, 2005	(United States) MGM Grand Garden Arena, Las Vegas, Nevada, USA	
2	Win	2–0	(United States) Brandon Jackson	KO	1 (4), 0:59	Feb 5, 2005	(United States) Savvis Center, St. Louis, Missouri, USA	
1	Win	1–0	(Haiti) Julio Jean	UD	4	2004-01-23	(United States) Harriet Himmel Theatre, West Palm Beach, Florida, USA	Professional debut.
