= Carlos Baldomir vs. Arturo Gatti =

Boxing match

- Date: July 22, 2006
- Venue: Boardwalk Hall, Atlantic City, New Jersey, U.S.
- Title(s) on the line: WBC, IBA and The Ring welterweight titles

Tale of the tape
| Boxer | Carlos Baldomir | Arturo Gatti |
| Nickname | Tata | Thunder |
| Hometown | Santa Fe, Argentina | Montreal, Quebec, Canada |
| Purse | $1,400,000 | $1,000,000 |
| Pre-fight record | 42–9–6 (12 KO) | 40–7 (31 KO) |
| Age | 35 years, 2 months | 34 years, 3 months |
| Height | 5 ft 7 in (170 cm) | 5 ft 8 in (173 cm) |
| Weight | 146 1/2 lb (66 kg) | 147 lb (67 kg) |
| Style | Orthodox | Orthodox |
| Recognition | WBC and The Ring; Welterweight Champion | WBC; No. 1 Ranked Welterweight; The Ring; No. 6 Ranked Welterweight; IBA welterweight champion 2-division world champion |

Result
- Baldomir wins via 9th-round technical knockout

Carlos Baldomir vs. Arturo Gatti was a professional boxing match contested on July 22, 2006, for the WBC, IBA and The Ring welterweight titles.

== Background ==
Following a lopsided loss to Floyd Mayweather Jr. in June 2005, 2-division champion Arturo Gatti made his return to boxing with a 11th-round knockout of the previously undefeated Thomas Damgaard. Immediately after his victory, which marked his full-time return to the welterweight division and gave him the fringe IBA welterweight title, Gatti called out newly-crowned WBC and The Ring welterweight champion Carlos Baldomir stating in his post-fight interview, "If Baldomir wants to make money and I want to win all his titles, then we should make the fight." Baldomir, had upset undisputed welterweight champion Zab Judah in his previous fight on January 7, 2006, and in a post-fight interview with Showtime sportscaster Jim Gray revealed that he would not give a rematch to Judah, opening up a path for Gatti.

In mid-February 2006, it was officially announced that Baldomir and Gatti would face one another on July 22 in Gatti's adopted hometown of Atlantic City, New Jersey. Prior to reaching the agreement with Gatti, Baldomir had been offered the chance to face unified light welterweight champion Ricky Hatton, who was looking to move up to welterweight at the time, as well as a two-fight deal with Golden Boy Promotions that would end with a fight against boxing superstar Oscar De La Hoya, but Baldomir turned down both offers in favor for a $1,400,000 payday against Gatti.

== Fight Details ==
Baldomir cruised to a relatively easy victory, landing over 100 punches (267) more than Gatti (161) and connecting at nearly a 50% success rate. Baldomir hurt Gatti with power shots all fight long, hitting Gatti with 226 power punches, mostly to the face, over the course of nine rounds. Approximately halfway through the fight, Gatti's face displayed cuts to both his lip and under his right eye, though he did rebound to win some of the middle rounds on the judge's scorecards. However, Baldomir regained control and dominated Gatti in round nine twice sent Gatti down in the ninth round; first after Baldomir landed with a left hook with around 30 seconds left in the round after a period of landing sustained offense on Gatti while he was against the ropes, and then again, after a dazed Gatti arose from the previous knockdown and indicated that he wanted to continue, when Baldomir sent Gatti down almost immediately after landing a short combination. Following the second knockdown, the fight was stopped and Baldomir named the winner with 10 seconds remaining in the round.

At the time of the stoppage Baldomir led of all three scorecards, 79–73, 78–74 & 77–75. HBO's unofficial ringside scorer Harold Lederman had scored it 78–74 to Baldomir.

== Fight card ==
Confirmed bouts:

| Weight Class | Weight | | vs. | | Method | Round | Notes |
|---|---|---|---|---|---|---|---|
| Welterweight | 147 lbs. | Carlos Baldomir (c) | def. | Arturo Gatti | TKO | 9/12 | ^{note 1} |
| Middleweight | 160 lbs. | Giovanni Lorenzo | def. | Bryon Mackie | TKO | 6/10 |
| Middleweight | 160 lbs. | Mariusz Cendrowski | def. | Patrick Thompson | MD | 8 |
| Heavyweight | 200+ lbs. | Malik Scott | def. | Marcus McGee | UD | 8 |
| Light Middleweight | 154 lbs. | Henry Crawford | def. | Roberto Valenzuela | UD | 6 |
| Middleweight | 160 lbs. | James Moore | def. | Jorge Alberto Gonzalez | UD | 6 |
| Welterweight | 147 lbs. | Alex Perez | def. | David Hernandez | TKO | 4/6 |

^Note 1 For WBC, IBA and The Ring Welterweight Titles

== Broadcasting ==
| Country | Broadcaster |
|---|---|
| United States | HBO |

| Preceded by vs. Zab Judah | Carlos Baldomir's bouts 22 July 2006 | Succeeded by vs. Floyd Mayweather Jr. |
| Preceded by vs. Thomas Damgaard | Arturo Gatti's bouts 22 July 2006 | Succeeded by vs. Alfonso Gómez |
