= Joseph Judah =

American boxer

Joseph Judah (born December 13, 1984) is an American Canadian fighting in the junior middleweight division. Joe is the brother of welterweight champion Zab Judah and former U.S. Boxing Association light heavyweight champion Daniel Judah. His trainer is his father, Yoel Judah. Judah has a professional record of 4 wins with no losses and one knockout.
