= Jaime Garza =

Jaime Garza may refer to:

- Jaime Garza (boxer) (born 1959), Mexican American boxer
- Jaime Garza (actor) (1954–2021), Mexican actor
