= Hasan Al =

Danish boxer

Personal information
- Born: 18 June 1972 (age 54) Sivas, Sivas Province, Turkey

Sport
- Sport: Boxing
- Weight class: Welterweight
Medal record
Men's amateur boxing
Representing Denmark
European Amateur Championships
Gold medal – first place	1996 Vejle	Welterweight

Hasan Al (born 18 June 1972 in Sivas, Sivas Province) is a Turkish-born boxer from Denmark, best known for winning the European welterweight title in 1996 as an amateur.

== Career ==
In his adopted country he became European champion in 1996 against Romania's Marian Simion. At the Olympics 1996, he defeated Ukraine's Sergiy Dzindziruk then lost to Simion.

Al turned professional at middleweight in 1996 but was not successful. He beat Meldrick Taylor on points in 1998. In 2001, he first drew then was outpointed in a rematch by Carlos Baldomir in his only loss. He retired in 2004.
