= Vernon Paris =

American boxer

Personal information
- Nickname: IceMan
- Born: January 5, 1988 (age 38) Detroit, Michigan, U.S.
- Height: 5 ft 7 in (170 cm)
- Weight: Light welterweight

Boxing career
- Reach: 69 in (175 cm)
- Stance: Orthodox

Boxing record
- Total fights: 34
- Wins: 29
- Win by KO: 17
- Losses: 2
- No contests: 3

Vernon Paris (born January 5, 1988) is an American professional boxer who fights at light welterweight division. He had three fights result with no contests because he tested positive for marijuana at the post-fight drug tests.

== Personal life ==
Paris grew up in Detroit, Michigan as a troubled youth. He was involved with gangs and committed petty crimes, which culminated in a shooting on the city's northwest side on the evening of July 25, 2006. Paris was shot three times: in the back, thigh, and groin. As a result of this attempted murder, he still has a bullet lodged in his back and thigh.

In May 2008, Paris was stabbed while being involved in a neighborhood argument and suffered a collapsed lung. Afterwards, Paris left for Florida to be with his girlfriend and family. He returned to Michigan in late 2009 to resume his fighting career along with his friend and promoter, Carlos Llinas.

== Career ==
=== Amateur career ===
Paris displayed considerable boxing talent from his amateur career, during which he trained at Kronk Gym under Sugar Hill, the nephew of Emanuel Steward.

=== Professional career ===
Paris was signed by Don King in 2011 and made his breakthrough as a professional with wins over Tim Coleman, Emanuel Augustus, and Ruben Galvan. He was named one of the sport's upcoming stars by The Boxing Tribune.

On March 24, 2012, Paris faced Zab Judah (41-7, 28 KOs) in an IBF light welterweight title elimination bout as the main event of NBC Sports Network's Fight Night from the Aviator Arena in Brooklyn, New York. Paris lost the bout in the 9th round via TKO. Paris currently trains with Dave Lester.

== Professional boxing record ==
34 fights, 29 wins (17 knockouts), 2 losses (1 knockout), 3 no contests
Res.	Record	Opponent	Type	Rd., Time	Date	Location	Notes
Loss	28–2	(United States) Frankie Gómez	UD	10	2014-07-25	(United States) Fantasy Springs Casino, Indio, California	
Win	28–1	(United States) Manuel Pérez	UD	10	2013-05-10	(United States) Detroit Masonic Temple, Detroit, Michigan	
Win	27–1	(United States) Guy Packer	TKO	3 (10), 1:29	2013-03-23	(United States) Wings Stadium, Kalamazoo, Michigan	
Loss	26–1	(United States) Zab Judah	TKO	9 (12)	2012-03-24	(United States) Aviator Sports & Events Center, Brooklyn, New York	
Win	26–0	(United States) Rubén Galván	UD	8	2011-10-06	(United States) MotorCity, Detroit, Michigan	
Win	25–0	(United States) Tim Coleman	TKO	7 (10), 0:27	2011-08-05	(United States) Chumash Casino Resort, Santa Ynez, California	Won USBA Light Welterweight title.
Win	24–0	(United States) Emanuel Augustus	UD	8	2011-01-29	(United States) Silverdome, Pontiac, Michigan	
Win	23–0	(Dominican Republic) Ramon Guevara	TKO	4 (10), 1:25	2010-11-12	(United States) Royal Oak Music Theatre, Royal Oak, Michigan	
Win	22–0	(United States) Courtney Burton	UD	8	2010-07-23	(United States) Royal Oak Music Theatre, Royal Oak, Michigan	
Win	21–0	(United States) Juan Santiago	SD	8	2010-05-14	(United States) Chumash Casino Resort, Santa Ynez, California	
Win	20–0	(Colombia) Oscar León	UD	6	2010-03-27	(United States) Joe Louis Arena, Detroit, Michigan	
Win	19–0	(United States) Corey Alarcon	UD	6	2010-01-29	(United States) Detroit Masonic Temple, Detroit, Michigan	
Win	18–0	(United States) Damon Antoine	TKO	2 (6), 0:44	2009-12-04	(United States) Royal Oak Music Theatre, Royal Oak, Michigan	
Win	17–0	(United States) Jesse Francisco	TKO	2 (4), 1:15	2009-11-13	(United States) Detroit Masonic Temple, Detroit, Michigan	
