= Wilfredo Negrón =

Puerto Rican boxer

Wilfredo Negron
Personal information
- Nickname: El Flaco / Papín
- Nationality: (Puerto Rico) Puerto Rican
- Born: Wilfredo Negron; November 13, 1973 (age 52) Toa Alta, Puerto Rico
- Weight: Light welterweight

Boxing career
- Stance: Orthodox

Boxing record
- Total fights: 43
- Wins: 26
- Win by KO: 19
- Losses: 16
- Draws: 1

Wilfredo Negron (born November 13, 1973, in Toa Alta, Puerto Rico) is a former professional boxer from Puerto Rico.

Wilfredo began boxing professionally in 1994, and faced a number of tough opponents in his 13-year career, such as Zab Judah, Martese Logan, and Emanuel Augustus. He has challenged for a number of minor titles, winning the WBA Fedecentro lightweight and light welterweight. In his one shot at a major title, the IBF light welterweight world championship, challenging Judah, he lost by knockout in the 4th of 12 rounds.

Negron also beat a former world champion, a severely faded Juan Meza, by first-round knockout in Meza's last fight, at age 41 in 1997.
