= Juan Meza =

Mexican boxer (1956–2023)

Personal information
- Nickname: Kid
- Born: Jesus Fernández; March 18, 1956 Mexicali, Baja California, Mexico
- Died: July 20, 2023 (aged 67)
- Height: 5 ft 7 in (170 cm)
- Weight: Super bantamweight

Boxing career
- Reach: 69 in (175 cm)
- Stance: Orthodox

Boxing record
- Total fights: 54
- Wins: 45
- Win by KO: 37
- Losses: 9

Juan Meza (born Jesus Fernández, March 18, 1956 – July 20, 2023), also known for his nickname Kid Meza, was a Mexican professional boxer who was world Super Bantamweight champion. Meza was born in Mexicali, Mexico.

== Short biography ==
Juan Meza was born as Jesus Fernández on March 18, 1956. Prior to beginning his career, and for undisclosed reasons, he changed his name officially to Juan Meza.

Meza was a popular fighter among Latin Americans, specially those of Mexican descent who lived in North America. His trainer was the well known boxing personality, Jimmy Montoya.

Juan Meza died on July 20, 2023, at the age of 67.

== Professional career ==
Juan Meza debuted on September 23, 1977, knocking out Elias Rodriguez in three rounds at Tucson.

Meza lost for the first time on his second bout, being beaten on points after four rounds by Valentin Holguin on October 13 in Los Angeles. Six days later, he knocked out Davey White in Las Vegas. Eight days later, he had a rematch with Holguin, over the extremely rare five rounds schedule distance. He avenged his first loss by outpointing Holguin.

On November 3, he scored his first knockout in the first round, defeating Horacio Pintado in Los Angeles. But, in his next fight, on November 18, he lost by a four-round decision to Carlos Ortiz, (not to be confused with the Puerto Rican world champion boxer and Hall of Famer of the same name) in San Diego.

Meza began rising in boxing's ranks when he knocked Ortiz out in the first round on December 16, also at San Diego. He won 29 of his next 31 bouts, earning fame, particularly in the West Coast of the United States.

Meza got his first world championship try, when he faced Wilfredo Gómez in Atlantic City, for the WBC world Super Bantamweight title. Meza lost to Gómez by a sixth-round knockout.

After losing to Gómez, Mesa took off one year from boxing. During this time, Gómez left the championship vacant; to challenge for the WBC's world Featherweight championship, and Jaime Garza won it by knocking out Bobby Berna for the vacant championship.

Meanwhile, Meza returned to boxing on April 26, 1983, knocking out Roberto Castillo in four rounds at Las Vegas.

Meza traveled to Thailand during July of that year, to fight Pongpan Sorphayathai on the 13th. of that month. He beat the Thai fighter by a third-round knockout.

On November 19, he fought Javier Barajas in Las Vegas, beating Barajas by a ten-round decision. The pair had a rematch, on May 16, 1984 in Las Vegas, and Meza won once again, by a ten-round decision. After that, he was ranked as the number one Super Bantamweight challenger once again by the WBC.

On November 3, he was given a second try at the championship when he faced Garza, in Kingston, New York. Meza became the first challenger in boxing history to be dropped in round one, get up and knock the world champion out in the same first round, when he beat Garza to become the WBC world Super Bantamweight champion that day.

On April 19, 1985 he and Julio César Chávez co-starred in an undercard, defending their world championships against Mike Ayala and Ruben Castillo, respectively, at the Inglewood Forum, in Inglewood, California. Both champions retained their titles with sixth-round knockout wins.

On August 18, he and Lupe Pintor squared off in a fight that garnered major interest among Mexican boxing fans. Meza lost his title in Mexico City that night, when Pintor dropped him twice, outpointing him over twelve rounds.

Pintor lost his title, in turn, to Samart Payakaroon, who gave Meza a chance to recover the WBC world Super Bantamweight championship on December 10, 1986 in Bangkok. Despite not fighting for more than a year, Meza lasted until the twelfth round with Payakaroon, who proceeded to knock him out in that round.

Meza had two fights in 1987, beating Lenny Valdez in the first round by knockout, and then losing to Javier Marquez by a knockout in round eight on October 30. After his fight with Marquez, he retired for ten years.

On February 14, 1997, he returned to boxing with a knockout victory, beating Esteban Lozoya in four rounds at Mexicali. But, in his next fight, he met fringe contender Wilfredo Negron of Puerto Rico, being knocked out by the Puerto Rican in the first round at Miami. Meza then retired for the second time.

== Professional boxing record ==
54 fights	45 wins	9 losses
By knockout	37	4
By decision	8	5

No.	Result	Record	Opponent	Type	Round, time	Date	Location	Notes
54	Loss	45–9	Wilfredo Negrón	TKO	1 (8)	1997-03-22	Mahi Temple Shrine Auditorium, Miami, Florida, U.S.	
53	Win	45–8	Esteban Lozoya	KO	4 (8)	1997-02-14	Salón Casa Blanca, Mexicali, Baja California, Mexico	
52	Loss	44–8	Javier Marquez	TKO	8 (10)	1987-10-30	Plaza de Toros Calafia, Mexicali, Baja California, Mexico	
51	Win	44–7	Lenny Valdez	TKO	1 (10)	1987-08-28	Plaza de Toros Calafia, Mexicali, Baja California, Mexico	
50	Loss	43–7	Samart Payakaroon	TKO	12 (12)	1986-12-10	Indoor Stadium Huamark, Bangkok, Thailand	For WBC super bantamweight title
49	Loss	43–6	Lupe Pintor	UD	12 (12)	1985-08-18	Palacio de los Deportes, Mexico City, Distrito Federal, Mexico	Lost WBC super bantamweight title
48	Win	43–5	Mike Ayala	TKO	6 (12)	1985-04-19	Forum, Inglewood, California, U.S.	Retained WBC super bantamweight title
47	Win	42–5	Jaime Garza	KO	1 (12)	1984-11-03	Midtown Neighborhood Center, Kingston, U.S.	Won WBC super bantamweight title
46	Win	41–5	Javier Barajas	SD	10 (10)	1984-05-16	Showboat Hotel and Casino, Sports Pavilion, Las Vegas, Nevada, U.S.	
45	Win	40–5	Javier Barajas	UD	10 (10)	1983-11-19	Showboat Hotel and Casino, Sports Pavilion, Las Vegas, Nevada, U.S.	
44	Win	39–5	Pongpan Sorphayathai	TKO	3 (12)	1983-07-13	Rajadamnern Stadium, Bangkok, Thailand	
43	Win	38–5	Roberto Castillo	TKO	8 (10)	1983-04-20	Civic Auditorium, San Jose, California, U.S.	
42	Loss	37–5	Wilfredo Gómez	TKO	6 (15)	1982-03-27	Playboy Hotel & Casino, Atlantic City, New Jersey, U.S.	For WBC super bantamweight title
41	Win	37–4	Antonio Guido	TKO	9 (10)	1982-01-30	Caesars Palace, Paradise, Nevada, U.S.	
40	Win	36–4	Lupe Martinez	TKO	4 (?)	1981-10-04	Mexicali, Baja California, Mexico	
39	Win	35–4	Carlos Mendoza	TKO	10 (12)	1981-08-21	Caesars Palace, Sports Pavilion, Paradise, Nevada, U.S.	
38	Win	34–4	James Martinez	MD	10 (10)	1981-05-28	Hacienda Hotel, Paradise, Nevada, U.S.	
37	Win	33–4	Javier Flores	TKO	8 (10)	1981-03-26	Hacienda Hotel, Paradise, Nevada, U.S.	
36	Win	32–4	Jose De la Cruz Lopez	TKO	2 (?)	1981-03-12	Grand Olympic Auditorium, Los Angeles, California, U.S.	
35	Win	31–4	Luis Avila	TKO	6 (10)	1980-12-19	Caesars Palace, Sports Pavilion, Paradise, Nevada, U.S.	
34	Win	30–4	Alfonso Rodriguez	UD	10 (10)	1980-11-20	Grand Olympic Auditorium, Los Angeles, California, U.S.	
33	Win	29–4	Pedro Chavez	KO	3 (10)	1980-10-09	Grand Olympic Auditorium, Los Angeles, California, U.S.	
32	Win	28–4	Francisco Marquez	TKO	1 (?)	1980-08-21	Grand Olympic Auditorium, Los Angeles, California, U.S.	
31	Loss	27–4	Carlos Mendoza	SD	10 (10)	1980-06-26	Grand Olympic Auditorium, Los Angeles, California, U.S.	
30	Win	27–3	Alex Garcia	KO	3 (10)	1980-05-22	Grand Olympic Auditorium, Los Angeles, California, U.S.	
29	Win	26–3	Jorge Altamirano	KO	3 (10)	1980-03-26	Silver Slipper, Paradise, Nevada, U.S.	
28	Win	25–3	Ruben Moreno	KO	6 (10)	1980-03-06	Grand Olympic Auditorium, Los Angeles, California, U.S.	
27	Win	24–3	Simon Fortanelle	KO	2 (10)	1980-01-20	Civic Plaza, Phoenix, Arizona, U.S.	
26	Win	23–3	Roy Hernandez	KO	1 (10)	1979-11-08	Grand Olympic Auditorium, Los Angeles, California, U.S.	
25	Win	22–3	Carlos Cantu	KO	3 (10)	1979-10-24	Silver Slipper, Paradise, Nevada, U.S.	
24	Win	21–3	Mucio Nava	KO	2 (10)	1979-10-03	Silver Slipper, Paradise, Nevada, U.S.	
23	Win	20–3	Humberto Lara	TKO	5 (10)	1979-08-16	Grand Olympic Auditorium, Los Angeles, California, U.S.	
22	Win	19–3	Rosendo Ramirez	TKO	5 (10)	1979-06-14	Silver Slipper, Paradise, Nevada, U.S.	
21	Win	18–3	Jose Luis Cruz	TKO	4 (10)	1979-03-21	Silver Slipper, Paradise, Nevada, U.S.	
20	Win	17–3	Noel Arriesgado	UD	10 (10)	1979-01-30	Blaisdell Center Arena, Honolulu, Hawaii, U.S.	
19	Win	16–3	James Martinez	SD	10 (10)	1979-01-09	Civic Plaza, Phoenix, Arizona, U.S.	
18	Win	15–3	Leonel Valencia	KO	2 (8)	1978-12-12	Memorial Auditorium, Sacramento, California, U.S.	
17	Win	14–3	Mauro Fuentes	TKO	2 (6)	1978-11-22	Civic Plaza, Phoenix, Arizona, U.S.	
16	Win	13–3	Jose Luis Lara	TKO	5 (10)	1978-11-15	Silver Slipper, Paradise, Nevada, U.S.	
15	Loss	12–3	William Berry	UD	10 (10)	1978-08-02	Silver Slipper, Paradise, Nevada, U.S.	
14	Win	12–2	Alfonso Cirillo	KO	1 (10)	1978-07-05	Silver Slipper, Paradise, Nevada, U.S.	
13	Win	11–2	Pascual Villareal	KO	2 (?)	1978-06-26	Bakersfield, California, U.S.	
12	Win	10–2	Jose Luis Garcia	KO	1 (?)	1978-06-14	Silver Slipper, Paradise, Nevada, U.S.	
11	Win	9–2	Luis Rico	TKO	2 (8)	1978-05-24	Silver Slipper, Paradise, Nevada, U.S.	
10	Win	8–2	Adun Aguilar	TKO	1 (?)	1978-05-10	Silver Slipper, Paradise, Nevada, U.S.	
9	Win	7–2	Rudy Ambriz	SD	4 (4)	1978-04-28	Coliseum, San Diego, California, U.S.	
8	Win	6–2	Julian Gaxiola	KO	1 (6)	1978-02-12	Plaza de Toros Calafia, Mexicali, Baja California, Mexico	
7	Win	5–2	Carlos Ortiz	KO	1 (4)	1977-12-16	Coliseum, San Diego, California, U.S.	
6	Loss	4–2	Carlos Ortiz	SD	4 (4)	1977-11-18	Coliseum, San Diego, California, U.S.	
5	Win	4–1	Horacio Pintado	KO	1 (?)	1977-11-03	Grand Olympic Auditorium, Los Angeles, California, U.S.	
4	Win	3–1	Valentin Holguin	PTS	5 (5)	1977-10-27	Grand Olympic Auditorium, Los Angeles, California, U.S.	
3	Win	2–1	Davey White	TKO	2 (6)	1977-10-19	Marina Hotel, Las Vegas, Nevada, U.S.	
2	Loss	1–1	Valentin Holguin	PTS	4 (4)	1977-10-13	Grand Olympic Auditorium, Los Angeles, California, U.S.	
1	Win	1–0	Elias Rodriguez	TKO	3 (6)	1977-09-23	Community Center, Tucson, Arizona, U.S.	

== See also ==
- List of world super-bantamweight boxing champions
- List of Mexican boxing world champions

Sporting positions
World boxing titles
Preceded by Jaime Garza	WBC super bantamweight champion November 3, 1984 – August 18, 1985	Succeeded by Lupe Pintor
