= Zab Judah vs. Carlos Baldomir =

Boxing match

Undisputed
- Date: January 7, 2006
- Venue: Madison Square Garden, New York, New York, U.S.
- Titles on the line: WBC and The Ring welterweight titles

Tale of the tape
Boxer	Zab Judah	Carlos Baldomir
Nickname	Super	Tata
Hometown	Brooklyn, New York, U.S.	Santa Fe, Argentina
Pre-fight record	34–2 (1) (25 KO)	41–9–6 (12 KO)
Age	28 years, 2 months	34 years, 8 months
Height	5 ft 7 1/2 in (171 cm)	5 ft 7 in (170 cm)
Weight	146 3/4 lb (67 kg)	146 1/4 lb (66 kg)
Style	Southpaw	Orthodox
Recognition	WBA, WBC, IBF and The Ring undisputed Welterweight Champion; The Ring No. 10 ranked pound-for-pound fighter	WBC; No. 1 Ranked Welterweight; The Ring; No. 10 Ranked Welterweight

Result
- Baldomir defeated Judah by unanimous decision

Zab Judah vs. Carlos Baldomir was a professional boxing match contested on January 7, 2006, for the WBC and The Ring welterweight championship.

== Background ==
After stopping Cory Spinks in February 2005 to win the Undisputed welterweight championship Zab Judah had made one successful defence, scoring a 3rd round TKO over Cosme Rivera in May, before agreeing to a big money bout with WBC Light Welterweight Champion Floyd Mayweather Jr., which was tentatively scheduled for April 2006. In the meantime Judah agreed to a tuneup bout as a New York homecoming against the largely unknown Carlos Baldomir.

The IBF and WBA belts were not on the line, because Baldomir had apparently not paid the sanctioning fees to the IBF and WBA, although Baldomir's camp later claimed that neither organization had ever approached them about paying the fees.

Judah entered the fight as a 10 to 1 favorite to win.

== The fights ==
=== Mormeck vs Bell ===
Undisputed:Jean-Marc Mormeck vs. O'Neil Bell
- Titles on the line: WBA, WBC, IBF & The Ring undisputed cruiserweight title

Tale of the tape
Boxer	Jean-Marc Mormeck	O'Neil Bell
Nickname	"The Marksman"	"Supernova"
Hometown	Pantin, Île-de-France, France	Atlanta, Georgia, U.S.
Pre-fight record	31–2 (21 KO)	25–1–1 (23 KO)
Age	33 years, 7 months	31 years
Height	5 ft 11 in (180 cm)	6 ft 0 in (183 cm)
Weight	197 3/4 lb (90 kg)	199 1/2 lb (90 kg)
Style	Orthodox	Orthodox
Recognition	WBA, WBC & The Ring; Cruiserweight Champion	IBF; Cruiserweight Champion; The Ring; No. 6 Ranked Cruiserweight

Result
- Bell defeats Mormeck by 10th round KO

The co main event would see the first Undisputed cruiserweight champion since Evander Holyfield in 1988, as WBA, WBC & The Ring champion Jean-Marc Mormeck faced IBF champion O'Neil Bell.

==== The fight ====
In the tenth round, Mormeck was floored after an array of power punches, the first time in his career he had been knocked down. Referee Wayne Kelly waved it off at the count of five, making Bell the new Undisputed cruiserweight champion.

At the time of the stoppage, Bell led on two of the judges' scorecards, 86-84 and 87-84 trailing 86-85 on the third.

==== Aftermath ====
Speaking after the bout Bell said "I can't take anything away from him. He's got a lot of power and was a great champion. A lesser fighter would have been stopped by his blows, but I was able to sustain his best shots, which broke his spirit. I knew then I had won." Mormeck was graceful in defeat saying "I lost one battle, but not the war. I don't know what changed things, but at a certain point, I realized that he was a great champion and that he was winning. Since he is the champion, he can make the decision about a rematch, but I would love to have a rematch."

Bell's reign as undisputed would last just over two months as he was stripped of the IBF belt on 31 March after undergoing dental surgery and subsequently withdrawing from a fight with mandatory challenger Steve Cunningham scheduled for 6 May.

With the WBO becoming the recognized fourth major sanctioning body in February 2007, this bout stands as the last undisputed title bout in the three belt era, the last in any weight class until Terence Crawford defeated Julius Indongo in August 2017 and the last in the cruiserweight division until 2018.

Preceded by vs. Wayne Braithwaite	Jean-Marc Mormeck's bouts 7 January 2006	Succeeded by vs. Sebastian Hill
Preceded by vs. Sebastiaan Rothmann	O'Neil Bell's bouts 7 January 2006	Succeeded by Rematch

=== Main Event ===
During the prefight introductions, instead of touching gloves to show sportsmanship, Judah unsportingly punched Baldomir on the thigh, earning a rebuke from referee Arthur Mercante Jr. The early rounds of the fight were close, but as the rounds passed, Judah was doing less than necessary to win, while Baldomir kept applying pressure on Judah. In round seven, Judah was hurt by a right hand and Baldomir landed a series of right hands to Judah's head along the ropes during the tenth round. Baldomir defeated Judah by unanimous decision with scores of 115–113, 114–113, and 115–112 from the three judges.

== Aftermath ==
With the victory, Baldomir won the lineal, WBC, and The Ring titles. Meanwhile, the WBA elevated "Regular" titleholder Luis Collazo, while the IBF still recognized Judah as champion. The welterweight division would remain split for 17 and a half years until Terence Crawford defeated Errol Spence Jr. in July 2023. The Ring named Baldomir's victory over Judah the upset of the year for 2006.

With the loss to Baldomir, it appeared that Judah's much anticipated bout with Mayweather was off, but Judah's promoter Don King, and Mayweather's promoter Bob Arum reworked the deals so the fight would go on.

== Undercard ==
Confirmed bouts:

== Broadcasting ==
Country	Broadcaster
United States	Showtime

Preceded by vs. Cosme Rivera	Zab Judah's bouts 7 January 2006	Succeeded by vs. Floyd Mayweather Jr.
Preceded by vs. Miguel Angel Rodriguez	Carlos Baldomir's bouts 7 January 2006	Succeeded by vs. Arturo Gatti
Awards
Preceded by Erik Morales vs. Zahir Raheem	The Ring Upset of the Year; 2006	Succeeded by Vic Darchinyan vs. Nonito Donaire
