= Floyd Mayweather Jr. vs. Carlos Baldomir =

Boxing competition

Pretty Risky
- Date: November 4, 2006
- Venue: Mandalay Bay Events Center, Paradise, Nevada, U.S.
- Title(s) on the line: WBC and The Ring welterweight titles

Tale of the tape
Boxer	Carlos Baldomir	Floyd Mayweather Jr.
Nickname	"Tata"	"Pretty Boy"
Hometown	Santa Fe, Argentina	Grand Rapids, Michigan, U.S.
Purse	$1,600,000	$8,000,000
Pre-fight record	43–9–6 (13 KO)	36–0 (24 KO)
Age	35 years, 6 months	29 years, 8 months
Height	5 ft 7 in (170 cm)	5 ft 8 in (173 cm)
Weight	147 lb (67 kg)	146 lb (66 kg)
Style	Orthodox	Orthodox
Recognition	WBC and The Ring Welterweight Champion	WBC/The Ring; No. 1 Ranked Welterweight; The Ring No. 1 ranked pound-for-pound fighter 4-division world champion

Result
- Mayweather Jr. wins via 12-round unanimous decision (120-108, 120-108, 118-110)

Floyd Mayweather Jr. vs. Carlos Baldomir, billed as Pretty Risky, was a boxing match for the WBC and The Ring welterweight titles.

The bout was held on November 4, 2006, at the Mandalay Bay Resort and Casino in Las Vegas, Nevada. The event also featured Robert Guerrero vs. Orlando Salido for the IBF featherweight title. Floyd Mayweather won this bout by a unanimous decision.

== Background ==
Prior to the bout, Mayweather held the IBF welterweight title. Mayweather was slated to fight the WBO welterweight champion Antonio Margarito in a unification fight but turned down the prospective fight as he and then-promoter, Bob Arum, disagreed on the prize purse. This led to Mayweather buying out his contract under Top Rank.

Mayweather expressed a desire to fight then-WBC super welterweight champion Oscar De La Hoya and so Mayweather relinquished his IBF welterweight title in anticipation of the mega bout. Subsequently, the vacant IBF welterweight title was won by Kermit Cintron.

However, the fight would not materialize until after May 5 of the following year, thus Mayweather opted to fight Carlos Baldomir for his WBC and The Ring welterweight titles.

Mayweather was a 4-1 favourite to win.

== The fight ==
Mayweather would dominate the bout, making full use of his speed against the plodding Baldomir, picked away with sharp jabs and hooks, cutting Baldomir over his left eye in the first round. Many of the crowd of 9,427 left before the fight ended due to the lack of action. At the end 12 rounds, Mayweather would be awarded a lopsided unanimous decision with two scores of 120-108 and one of 118–110.

== Aftermath ==
At the post-fight press conference, Mayweather said he would retire after his next fight.

== Fight earnings ==
325,000 pay-per-view buys, $16.3 million in television revenue.

== Undercard ==
Confirmed bouts:

== Broadcasting ==
Country	Broadcaster
United Kingdom	Sky Sports
United States	HBO

Preceded by vs. Arturo Gatti	Carlos Baldomir's bouts 4 November 2006	Succeeded by vs. Vernon Forrest
Preceded by vs. Zab Judah	Floyd Mayweather Jr.'s bouts 4 November 2006	Succeeded by vs. Oscar De La Hoya
