= Tomas Barrientes =

American boxer

Personal information
- Nickname: Tommy Gun
- Born: Tomas Barrientes; March 10, 1970 (age 56) Mercedes, Texas
- Height: 5 ft 8 in (1.73 m)
- Weight: Light Middleweight; Welterweight; Light Welterweight

Boxing career
- Reach: 71 in (182 cm)
- Stance: Orthodox

Boxing record
- Total fights: 39
- Wins: 27
- Win by KO: 17
- Losses: 11
- Draws: 1
- No contests: 0

Tomas Barrientes (born March 10, 1970) is an American professional boxer and is the former IBA Light Welterweight Champion.

== Professional career ==
=== IBA Light Welterweight Championship ===
In June 2004, Barrientes upset Emanuel Augustus to win the IBA Light Welterweight title.

=== Ortiz vs. Barrientes ===
On April 14, 2007 Tomas was knocked out by title contender Victor Ortíz at the Alamodome in San Antonio, Texas.
