= Jaime Garza (boxer) =

American boxer

Personal information
- Nickname: El Rayo
- Born: September 10, 1959 (age 66) Santa Cruz, California, U.S.
- Height: 5 ft 7 in (170 cm)
- Weight: Super bantamweight

Boxing career
- Reach: 67 in (170 cm)
- Stance: Orthodox

Boxing record
- Total fights: 54
- Wins: 48
- Win by KO: 44
- Losses: 6

Jaime Garza (born September 10, 1959) is an American former professional boxer who competed from 1978 to 1995. He held the WBC super bantamweight title from 1983 to 1984.

== Biography ==
Garza is of Mexican descent. In February 1978, he won his pro debut by knocking out Eduardo Villareal. On June 15, 1983, an undefeated Garza defeated Bobby Berna to win the WBC Super Bantamweight title. He would lose the title in his second defense against Juan Meza.

== Professional boxing record ==
54 fights	48 wins	6 losses
By knockout	44	5
By decision	4	1

No.	Result	Record	Opponent	Type	Round, time	Date	Location	Notes
54	Loss	48–6	José Luis Madrid	TKO	6 (10)	1995-02-16	Olympic Auditorium, Los Angeles, California, U.S.	
53	Loss	48–5	Mark Smith	TKO	2 (10)	1993-03-09	La Villa Real Convention Center, McAllen, Texas, U.S.	
52	Win	48–4	Rosendo Alonso	KO	1 (10)	1989-03-30	Hollywood Palladium, Hollywood, California, U.S.	
51	Loss	47–4	Marcos Villasana	KO	5 (10)	1988-03-24	Sports Arena, Los Angeles, California, U.S.	
50	Win	47–3	James Manning	TKO	6 (10)	1987-12-09	Spruce Goose Dome, Long Beach, California, U.S.	
49	Loss	46–3	Georgie Navarro	UD	10 (10)	1987-06-30	Forum, Inglewood, California, U.S.	
48	Win	46–2	Joe Ruelaz	SD	10 (10)	1987-05-18	Forum, Inglewood, California, U.S.	
47	Win	45–2	Dwight Pratchett	UD	10 (10)	1987-04-09	Forum, Inglewood, California, U.S.	
46	Loss	44–2	Darryl Thigpen	TKO	6 (10)	1987-01-26	Marriott Hotel, Irvine, California, U.S.	
45	Win	44–1	Carlos Linares	TKO	5 (10)	1986-12-10	Spruce Goose Dome, Long Beach, California, U.S.	
44	Win	43–1	Mario Gomez	KO	4 (10)	1986-04-28	Marriott Hotel, Irvine, California, U.S.	
43	Win	42–1	Jorge Urbina Diaz	TKO	3 (10)	1986-04-05	Hilton Riviera, Palm Springs, California, U.S.	
42	Win	41–1	Arnel Arrozal	TKO	3 (10)	1986-02-24	Marriott Hotel, Irvine, California, U.S.	
41	Loss	40–1	Juan Meza	KO	1 (12)	1984-11-03	Midtown Neighborhood Center, Kingston, New York, U.S.	Lost WBC super bantamweight title
40	Win	40–0	Felipe Orozco	KO	3 (12)	1984-05-26	Miami Beach, Florida, U.S.	Retained WBC super bantamweight title
39	Win	39–0	Austreberto Perez	KO	5 (10)	1983-11-17	Olympic Auditorium, Los Angeles, California, U.S.	
38	Win	38–0	Bobby Berna	TKO	2 (12)	1983-06-15	Olympic Auditorium, Los Angeles, California, U.S.	Won vacant WBC super bantamweight title
37	Win	37–0	Ruben Moreno	TKO	1 (10)	1983-03-03	Olympic Auditorium, Los Angeles, California, U.S.	
36	Win	36–0	Hugo Partida	KO	1 (10)	1982-11-06	Olympic Auditorium, Los Angeles, California, U.S.	
35	Win	35–0	Carmelo Negron	TKO	5 (10)	1982-06-19	Hacienda Hotel, Paradise, Nevada, U.S.	
34	Win	34–0	Carlos Mendoza	TKO	10 (10)	1982-02-04	Olympic Auditorium, Los Angeles, California, U.S.	
33	Win	33–0	Joaquin Acuna	TKO	4 (10)	1981-12-17	Olympic Auditorium, Los Angeles, California, U.S.	
32	Win	32–0	Antonio de la Paz	KO	2 (10)	1981-11-19	Olympic Auditorium, Los Angeles, California, U.S.	
31	Win	31–0	Romero Lira	KO	3 (10)	1981-10-15	Olympic Auditorium, Los Angeles, California, U.S.	
30	Win	30–0	Rodolfo Quintero	TKO	2 (10)	1981-09-03	Olympic Auditorium, Los Angeles, California, U.S.	
29	Win	29–0	Carlos Zuniga	KO	2 (10)	1981-08-20	Forum, Inglewood, California, U.S.	
28	Win	28–0	Lupe Martinez	TKO	2 (10)	1981-07-26	Showboat Hotel and Casino, Las Vegas, Nevada, U.S.	
27	Win	27–0	Franco Torregoza	KO	1 (10)	1981-06-19	Showboat Hotel and Casino, Las Vegas, Nevada, U.S.	
26	Win	26–0	Alex Garcia	KO	2 (10)	1981-05-15	Sports Arena, Los Angeles, California, U.S.	
25	Win	25–0	Hector Cortez	TKO	1 (10)	1981-04-04	Olympic Auditorium, Los Angeles, California, U.S.	
24	Win	24–0	Robert Anderson	KO	1 (10)	1981-02-17	Olympic Auditorium, Los Angeles, California, U.S.	
23	Win	23–0	Manuel Ruelas	KO	1 (10)	1980-12-13	County Coliseum, El Paso, Texas, U.S.	
22	Win	22–0	Jose Luis Valente	KO	3 (10)	1980-10-30	Olympic Auditorium, Los Angeles, California, U.S.	
21	Win	21–0	Calvin Sheppard	TKO	4 (10)	1980-09-13	Freeman Coliseum, San Antonio, Texas, U.S.	
20	Win	20–0	Lorenzo Ramirez	KO	4 (10)	1980-08-07	Olympic Auditorium, Los Angeles, California, U.S.	
19	Win	19–0	Luis Sandoval	KO	3 (10)	1980-07-17	Olympic Auditorium, Los Angeles, California, U.S.	
18	Win	18–0	Frankie Granados	KO	1 (10)	1980-06-21	Caesars Palace Sports Pavilion, Paradise, Nevada, U.S.	
17	Win	17–0	Luis Avila	PTS	10 (10)	1980-05-13	Bakersfield, California, U.S.	
16	Win	16–0	Jose Reyna	KO	1 (10)	1980-05-02	Arena, San Bernardino, California, U.S.	
15	Win	15–0	Pedro Gonzalez	TKO	2 (10)	1980-04-12	Civic Auditorium, Tucson, Arizona, U.S.	
14	Win	14–0	Luis Avila	TKO	8 (8)	1980-03-21	Arena, San Bernardino, California, U.S.	
13	Win	13–0	Jose Hernandez	TKO	2 (8)	1980-02-22	Arena, San Bernardino, California, U.S.	
12	Win	12–0	Joe Lopez	TKO	1 (6)	1980-02-02	Veteran's Memorial Coliseum, Phoenix, Arizona, U.S.	
11	Win	11–0	Jose Luis Lopez	KO	1 (6)	1979-12-14	Arena, San Bernardino, California, U.S.	
10	Win	10–0	Ernesto Rios	TKO	3 (6)	1979-12-08	Sports Arena, Los Angeles, California, U.S.	
9	Win	9–0	Fernando Reyes	TKO	2 (6)	1979-11-02	Coliseum, San Diego, California, U.S.	
8	Win	8–0	Ramon Barrera	TKO	3 (?)	1979-09-25	Sports Arena, Los Angeles, California, U.S.	
7	Win	7–0	Jose Villegas	PTS	6 (6)	1979-08-23	Olympic Auditorium, Los Angeles, California, U.S.	
6	Win	6–0	Jose Villegas	KO	4 (6)	1979-01-18	Olympic Auditorium, Los Angeles, California, U.S.	
5	Win	5–0	Delfino Cornejo	TKO	2 (6)	1979-01-11	Olympic Auditorium, Los Angeles, California, U.S.	
4	Win	4–0	Augustin Sanchez	TKO	2 (4)	1978-12-14	Olympic Auditorium, Los Angeles, California, U.S.	
3	Win	3–0	Miguel Bejarano	KO	1 (4)	1978-11-30	Olympic Auditorium, Los Angeles, California, U.S.	
2	Win	2–0	Francisco Silva	KO	1 (4)	1978-03-18	Reynosa, Tamaulipas, Mexico	
1	Win	1–0	Eduardo Villareal	KO	1 (4)	1978-02-04	Reynosa, Tamaulipas, Mexico	

== See also ==
- List of world super-bantamweight boxing champions
- List of Mexican boxing world champions

Sporting positions
World boxing titles
Vacant Title last held by Wilfredo Gómez	WBC super bantamweight champion June 15, 1983 – November 3, 1984	Succeeded by Juan Meza
