= Zab Judah =

American boxer (born 1977)

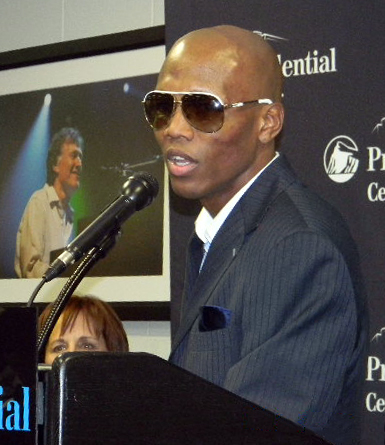
- Judah in 2010

Personal information
- Nickname: Super
- Born: Zabdiel Judah; October 27, 1977 (age 49) New York City, New York, U.S.
- Height: 5 ft 7 in (170 cm)
- Weight: Light welterweight; Welterweight; Light middleweight

Boxing career
- Reach: 72 in (183 cm)
- Stance: Southpaw

Boxing record
- Total fights: 56
- Wins: 44
- Win by KO: 30
- Losses: 10
- No contests: 2

Zabdiel Judah (born October 27, 1977) is an American former professional boxer who competed from 1996 to 2019. He held multiple world championships in two weight classes, including the undisputed championship (Note: Three-belt era: World Boxing Association (WBA) (Undisputed version), World Boxing Council (WBC), and International Boxing Federation (IBF) titles.) at welterweight in 2005, and the lineal championship from 2005 to 2006. He also held the International Boxing Federation (IBF) and World Boxing Organization (WBO) junior welterweight titles between 2000 and 2004, and the IBF title again in 2011. Judah's career ended in 2019 when he was hospitalized after suffering a brain bleed in a stoppage loss to Cletus Seldin. Judah has emergency brain surgery six weeks after the match in July 2019.

== Amateur career ==
Judah began boxing at the age of six and compiled an amateur record of 110–5. He was a two-time US national champion and three-time New York Golden Gloves Champion. He also won the 1996 PAL National Championship. Judah beat Ishe Smith and Hector Camacho Jr., but lost to David Díaz in the finals of the Olympic trials, thus failing to qualify for the Olympic boxing team (he still went to those Olympic Games as an alternate, however).

== Professional career ==
=== Light welterweight ===
==== Early years ====
Judah made his professional debut as an 18-year-old on September 20, 1996, in Miami, Florida and defeated Michael Johnson by technical knockout in the second round. On April 14, 1998, Judah defeated Angel Beltre in the second round. Judah accidentally butted heads with Esteban Flores in a fight in March 1999. Flores was cut on his forehead, and the match was halted in the third round. The bout was originally recorded as a technical draw, but the result was changed to a no contest in May 1999.

Judah then defeated Micky Ward by unanimous decision for the USBA Light Welterweight title. He successfully defended the USBA title by stopping Darryl Tyson in the eleventh round on October 15, 1998.

==== IBF champion ====
Judah defeated Wilfredo Negron in January 1999 with a fourth-round knockout to win the Interim IBF Light Welterweight title. On February 12, 2000, he defeated Jan Piet Bergman to win the vacant IBF Light Welterweight title. Bergman went down twice in the first round, but recovered in the second round, knocking Judah down. Judah knocked out Bergman in the fourth round to win the title. On June 20, 2000, Judah made his first title defense against Junior Witter in Glasgow, Scotland. It was an awkward fight for Judah, as Witter rarely engaged in an extended exchange of punches. Witter frequently switched between fighting right-handed and left-handed, making him an elusive opponent. Judah's consistent body punching slowed Witter down, and in the fifth round, Judah caught Witter with a straight left hand that hurt Witter and sent his mouthpiece skittering across the ring. Judah defeated Witter by unanimous decision.

Two months later, on August 5, 2000, at the Mohegan Sun in Connecticut, Judah defeated former IBF Light Welterweight Champion Terron Millett by fourth-round knockout. Judah was knocked down in the first round from a left hand. Judah rose quickly, and from that point on he dominated the fight. Judah hurt Millett with two combinations near the end of the first round. In round two, Judah sent Millett down with a right hand to the chin. Millett survived the round, but he was clearly hurt. In round four, Judah charged across the ring and inflicted a series of blows on Millett, knocking him down again. Millett got up, but Judah continued his assault and knocked Millett down again. Millett rose at the count of four, but his legs were unsteady and the referee decided to stop the bout.

In his third title defense, Judah stopped Hector Quiroz in the eighth round on October 20, 2000, at The Palace of Auburn Hills in Auburn Hills, Michigan. On January 13, 2001, Judah defeated Reggie Green by tenth-round technical knockout at the Mohegan Sun in Connecticut. Judah had trouble landing punches effectively against Green for the majority of the fight, but in round ten, he knocked Green down with a left hook. Green beat the count, but Judah then ran across the ring and sent Green down to the canvas with a right hand, forcing the referee to stop the fight. On June 23, 2001, Judah defeated Allan Vester by third-round knockout in his fifth successful defense of the IBF title. In round two, Judah put Vester down to the canvas twice. In the third round, Judah knocked out Vester with a left hand that connected on Vester's temple. Vester went down on his knees and nearly lost his mouthpiece. The referee stopped the fight right before the closing bell. The fight would set up a unification match between Judah and WBC and WBA Light Welterweight Champion Kostya Tszyu, who defeated Oktay Urkal on the undercard.

==== Judah vs. Tszyu ====
The much anticipated matchup between Judah and Tsyzu took place on November 3, 2001, at the MGM Grand in Las Vegas, Nevada for the Undisputed Light Welterweight Championship. Judah entered the fight as a 3-to-1 favorite to win. With 10 seconds left to go in round two, Tszyu landed a right hand clean on Judah's chin and he backed away from Tszyu with his hands down. Tszyu went after Judah, throwing another right hand that landed on his chin and sent Judah crashing to the canvas. Judah jumped up instinctively and tried to signal that he was fine to referee Jay Nady, but was still very much dazed by the punch – evidenced by him wobbling severely on extremely unstable legs before falling to the canvas a second time. When Judah collapsed, Nady waved the fight over, resulting in a technical knockout victory for Tsyzu and Judah's first professional loss.

While Tszyu celebrated in his corner, Judah was in disbelief of what just happened and became infuriated. Judah picked up his stool and hurled it towards center ring. While being restrained by his father and trainer, Yoel Judah, he broke loose and walked up to Nady and stuck his gloved fist into his neck and had to be pulled off by cornermen. A few minutes later, Jimmy Lennon Jr. announced the official decision and Judah screamed out and again had to be restrained by a growing number of security guards and cornermen. Judah was fined $100,000 and suspended for one year by the Nevada State Athletic Commission.

==== Judah vs. Corley ====
After defeating Omar Weis by unanimous decision in July 2002, Judah challenged DeMarcus Corley for the WBO Light Welterweight title on July 12, 2003, at the Orleans Hotel and Casino in Las Vegas. Judah knocked Corley down with a left hand in the third round en route to defeating Corley by split decision. Judah broke his left hand during the fight. In his only defense of the WBO title, Judah knocked out Jaime Rangel in the first round on December 13, 2003.

=== Welterweight ===
==== Judah vs. Spinks ====
On April 10, 2004, at the Mandalay Bay Resort and Casino in Las Vegas, Judah fought Cory Spinks for the Undisputed Welterweight Championship. Judah had trouble at the start figuring out how to fight Spinks, the taller fighter. He could not move forward to get inside, but was having success moving laterally. Spinks scored a knockdown in the eleventh round, but Judah came back and put Spinks down to the canvas in the final round. In the end, Spinks defeated Judah by unanimous decision with scores of 114–112 twice and 116–112. In a 2026 Ring Champs interview, Zab stated that since it was his first welterweight fight, he decided to box Spinks and didn't realize until the twelfth round knockdown that he could have done that all night.

==== Judah vs. Pineda ====
In 2004, Judah defeated the former champion Rafael Pineda by split decision.

==== Judah vs. Spinks II ====
On February 5, 2005, Judah would get a rematch with Spinks at the Savvis Center in St. Louis, Missouri, Spinks' hometown. The fight was the first major bout in St. Louis in more than 40 years, and it was a sellout. Judah was the aggressor throughout the fight. He knocked Spinks down to his knees at the bell in the seventh round, but it was not ruled a knockdown. Spinks had a strong start to the ninth round and connected with a left hand, then followed with a right hand and a combination, but Judah scored a knockdown moments later. Judah pressed the attack after the first knockdown and avoided Spinks' desperate efforts to tie him up. After Spinks was knocked down for the second time, the referee stopped the fight, and Judah became the new Undisputed Welterweight Champion.

=== Undisputed welterweight champion ===
==== Judah vs. Rivera ====
In his first fight as undisputed welterweight champion, he fought Cosme Rivera on May 14, 2005, at the MGM Grand in Las Vegas. Judah sent Rivera down with a straight left hand to the face less than 30 seconds into the bout. Rivera beat the count, but was knocked down again about 10 seconds later. Judah hit Rivera hard several times in the second round, and in the third round, he connected with a left uppercut, that caused Rivera to stagger backwards and fall into the ropes before hitting the canvas. Rivera rose at the count of five, but he was badly hurt and the referee stopped the fight.

==== Judah vs. Baldomir ====
His next fight took place on January 7, 2006, at Madison Square Garden in New York City against Carlos Baldomir. For Judah, the fight was viewed as a tuneup bout that would lead to a lucrative bout between Judah and WBC Light Welterweight Champion Floyd Mayweather Jr., which was tentatively scheduled for April. Judah entered the fight as a 10-to-1 favorite over Baldomir. The stage was set when Judah unsportingly punched Baldomir on the thigh during the prefight introductions instead of touching gloves to show sportsmanship. The early rounds of the fight were close, but as the rounds passed, Judah was doing less than necessary to win, while Baldomir kept applying pressure on Judah. In round seven, Judah was hurt by a right hand and Baldomir landed a series of right hands to Judah's head along the ropes during the tenth round. Baldomir defeated Judah by unanimous decision with scores of 115–113, 114–113 and 115–112 from the three judges.

The Ring named Baldomir's victory over Judah the upset of the year for 2006. Judah's IBF and WBA belts were not on the line, because Baldomir did not pay sanctioning fees to the IBF and WBA. Baldomir did win the lineal, WBC and The Ring titles, while the WBA (Super) title was vacated after Judah's loss (WBA (Regular) titleholder Luis Collazo became the sole WBA Champion), but the IBF still recognized him as their champion.

==== Judah vs. Mayweather ====
With the loss to Baldomir, it appeared that Judah's much anticipated bout with Mayweather was off, but Judah's promoter Don King and Mayweather's promoter Bob Arum reworked the deals so the fight would go on. Mayweather was scheduled to earn a minimum $6 million while Judah was to earn $3 million plus a percentage of the profits, but because of Judah's loss, Mayweather earned a minimum $5 million while Judah was guaranteed $1 million plus a percentage of profits above $7 million. The fight took place on April 8, 2006, at the Thomas and Mack Center in Las Vegas.

Judah started strongly and put up a valiant fight, at times matching Mayweather's speed and punching precision. It appeared that Judah scored a knockdown in the second round when Mayweather's glove touched the canvas; however, referee Richard Steele ruled it a slip. In round four, Judah landed a right hand to the head that caused Mayweather to retreat to the ropes and cover up. The momentum changed in the fifth round, when Mayweather hurt Judah with a combination to the face. Then Mayweather landed a right hand on the bridge of Judah's nose, and blood began to flow. The seventh round was the most dominant for Mayweather to that point. Once again, he drew blood from Judah's nose. A combination from Mayweather backed Judah into a corner, and Judah's foot movement was considerably slower than it had been earlier in the fight.

With about 10 seconds left in the tenth round, Judah hit Mayweather with a low blow and followed it with a right hand to the back of Mayweather's head. As Mayweather hopped around the ring in pain, Steele called time to give Mayweather a rest period. Mayweather's uncle and trainer, Roger Mayweather, climbed into the ring and approached Judah. Yoel Judah entered the ring and threw a punch at Roger. At that point, members of both fighters' camps entered the ring and an all-out melee ensued. More than a dozen security officers and police officers rushed into the ring and managed to control the situation. After the ring was cleared, Roger Mayweather was ejected from the fight. Mayweather cruised through the last two rounds on his way to a unanimous decision victory by scores of 116–112, 117–111 and 119–109.

After the fight, the purses for both fighters were withheld until video of the fight could be reviewed. Don King argued that Mayweather should have been disqualified because his uncle was the first person to enter the ring. At an April 13 hearing, the Nevada State Athletic Commission fined Roger Mayweather $200,000 and revoked his boxing license for one year. At a hearing on May 8, the Commission disciplined the other offenders in the melee. It fined Yoel Judah $100,000 and revoked his license for one year, fined Mayweather cornerman Leonard Ellerbe $50,000 and suspended his license for four months, and fined Zab Judah $350,000 and revoked his license for one year.

==== Return from suspension ====
On April 13, 2007, Judah made his return to the ring against Ruben Galvan at the Fitzgeralds Casino & Hotel in Tunica, Mississippi. Judah came out strongly in the first round, landing numerous shots on Galvan. During the round, a bad cut opened near the top of Galvan's head. The referee called for a timeout to allow the doctor to take a look at the cut. Due to the severity of the cut, the fight was waved off. The cut was ruled to be caused by an accidental foul with an elbow and since the fight did not go past four rounds, the fight was ruled a no contest.

==== Judah vs. Cotto ====
On June 9, 2007, Judah took on WBA Welterweight Champion Miguel Cotto in New York City before a soldout crowd at Madison Square Garden. In the first round, Cotto landed a low blow that put Judah to the canvas. Referee Arthur Mercante Jr. offered a stern warning to Cotto. In the third round, Judah took yet another low blow from Cotto, which resulted in Cotto receiving a point deduction. Cotto and Judah delivered an all-action brawl, but after weathering some difficult early rounds as he figured out Judah's southpaw style and adjusted to his speed, Cotto took over the bout. In round seven, both fighters went toe-to-toe and in round eight he hurt Judah several times. In round nine, Judah took a knee to gain a breather from Cotto's aggressive style. By the tenth round, Judah was bleeding from a cut over his right eye and was hurt by an uppercut from Cotto that sent him retreating to the ropes, but Judah stayed upright. Early in the eleventh round, Cotto landed a combination that dropped Judah to the canvas. He managed to get to his feet, but Cotto went after Judah with a relentless attack, turning him sideways along the ropes as he continued to throw punches. That forced the referee to stop the fight.

Judah, who trailed 97–91 on all three scorecards, claimed he had been weakened by the two low blows early in the fight. He said, "The first low blow was very hard. The second one took a lot out of me. The low blows affected me from the time they hit me." Cotto earned $2.5 million plus a piece of the pay-per-view profits, while Judah earned $1 million plus a percentage of the profits.

Judah fought Edwin Vazquez at the Hard Rock resort in Biloxi, Mississippi on September 7, 2007. Despite suffering a cut over his left eye, Judah defeated the overmatched Vazquez by unanimous decision. Judah hurt Vazquez several times over the course of the contest, but he injured his left hand midway through the fight and was unable to finish off Vasquez.

=== Light middleweight ===
On November 17, 2007, Judah defeated Ryan Davis by unanimous decision. With the win, he won the vacant IBC light middleweight title. The fight took place at the Casablanca Casino in Providenciales, Turks And Caicos Islands which had an open roof. In the third round it began to rain. Since there was no marquee covering the ring, both fighters continued to fight in the rain. During the third, Judah scored a knockdown on Davis, although he recovered, he went on to lose by a wide margin (119–109, 119–109, 118–110).

Judah was scheduled to fight Shane Mosley on May 31, 2008, at the Mandalay Bay Resort and Casino in Las Vegas, but it was postponed after Judah needed 50 stitches in his right arm after slipping in his bathroom and smashing it through a glass shower door.

=== Return to welterweight ===
==== Judah vs. Clottey ====
On August 2, 2008, Judah lost to Joshua Clottey by technical decision in a fight for the vacant IBF Welterweight title at the Palms Casino Resort in Las Vegas. Judah began the busier fighter, showing quick hands and throwing effective combinations behind a jab. Clottey began steadily closing the distance between himself and his opponent from the third round, landing an increasing number of punches that took their toll on Judah. In round four, Clottey landed an uppercut that caused Judah to lose his balance, and by the end of the round, Judah had blood running down his nose. Judah staged a comeback in the sixth round, but in the middle of the seventh round, Clottey landed a right hand that hurt Judah and caused him to back into a corner. In round nine, Judah suffered a cut over his right eye and the fight was stopped after he said he could not see. The referee had ruled the cut was caused by an accidental clash of heads and so the fight went to the scorecards. Two judges scored the fight 86–85 and the other judge scored it 87–84, all in favor of Clottey.

==== Comeback trail ====
After the loss to Clottey, Judah fought Ernest Johnson on November 8, 2008, at Madison Square Garden in New York City. Judah dominated the bout early, but in round three, Judah suffered two cuts from accidental head butts. Finding success with lead right hands and short left hands. Judah won the bout by unanimous decision with scores of 99–91, 98–92 and 98–92.

On November 6, 2009, Judah took on Ubaldo Hernandez from Mexico at Palms Resort, in Las Vegas, Nevada. Judah won the fight by TKO in the second round.

Judah was in line for a fight with Devon Alexander, after the latter's win against Juan Urango. He has also been linked to a match with Timothy Bradley, as he was considered as a possible replacement for Marcos Maidana. The former undisputed champion publicly challenged both of them on more than one occasion in 2010. Promoter Gary Shaw tried to begin negotiations with Judah for a potential bout in 2010. However, Judah declined the match but promised to fight Bradley and Alexander after a tune-up fight on July 16 at the Prudential Center in New Jersey.

The Brooklyn native's tune up fight in July was co-promoted by Main Events and Super Judah Promotions. In June 2010, Judah expressed his intention in moving down to the light welterweight division after the upcoming fight, hoping to revitalize his career. His opponent was Jose Armando Santa Cruz of Mexico (28–4; 17 KO). Judah won the bout by TKO in round three.

=== Return to light welterweight ===
==== Judah vs. Matthysse ====
On November 6, 2010, Judah won a split decision over previously undefeated Lucas Matthysse in a fight for the vacant regional NABO Light Welterweight title at the Prudential Center in Newark, New Jersey. The former world champion fought in the light welterweight division for the first time in almost seven years.

The Brooklyn native began the busier fighter, using the jab and trying to land uppercuts for the first two rounds, while Matthysse worked on the body. In round three, a clash of heads opened a cut outside of the left eye of Judah. Matthysse displayed more aggression and became the aggressor in the third and the fourth round and Judah switched to a defensive tactic. In the next two rounds, the American boxer picked up the pace, beginning to land more combinations. The seventh round was less active but in the eight, Judah landed some hard right counter shots. Judah continued to box throughout the ninth round but Matthysse began to show more power in the tenth, focusing on the head of his opponent and knocking down the American boxer after a hard right hand to the jaw. Judah got up but he was hurt, and the Argentine fighter tried to press the attack after the knockdown. However, Judah held and worked on the defensive and managed to finish the bout. Two judges scored the fight 114–113 for Judah, while the other judge scored it 114–113 for Matthysse.

==== Second IBF title reign ====
Following the win against Matthysse, negotiations for a fight against Kaizer Mabuza began. Both sides eventually agreed to a March 5 bout, with the vacant IBF Light Welterweight title on the line. Former champion Pernell Whitaker joined Judah's training camp to help him prepare for the match. Whitaker said: "I don't train guys to be like me. I help guys to do the things that work for them. If I can teach you how to hit and not get hit, that's a blessing for you. Zab has the same abilities I have, but Zab still has to put it together and do it the way that Zab knows how to do it." On March 5, 2011, Judah defeated Mabuza via technical knockout in the seventh round, at the Prudential Center in Newark, New Jersey, claiming the IBF title again after almost ten years.

==== Judah vs. Khan ====
Judah fought WBA (Super) champion Amir Khan in a unification bout on July 23, 2011, at Mandalay Bay Resort & Casino, Las Vegas. Judah was knocked out by Khan in the 5th round after Khan landed an uppercut body shot. Judah was unable to answer the referee's 10 count, thus recording his 7th career loss. Khan was ahead 40–36 on all three judges score cards at the time of the knock out. Judah was adamant that the body shot should have been called low and claimed that he had been expecting a mandatory five-minute recovery period.

=== Judah vs Paris ===
After the loss against Amir Khan, Zab Judah started resurrecting his career fighting the undefeated 26–0 prospect Vernon Paris, In the buildup to this fight it was bad blood between the two but when it came to fight night, Judah started out strong and hurt Paris right away in the first round then he slowed down a bit but was still dominant using his handspeed and in the 9th round Judah landed a perfect left hand which hurt Paris and started throwing a flurry of punches which landed, Paris had no response and the referee stepped in and stopped the fight.

==== Judah vs. García ====
Judah's next bout was scheduled for February 9 against undefeated WBC & WBA (Super) Champion Danny García at the Barclays Center in Brooklyn, but was subsequently rescheduled to April 27, 2013, due to a rib injury sustained by Garcia during training. After a heated week of pre-fight confrontations, fans were expecting something special from Danny Garcia vs. Zab Judah. And the fighters delivered, though in an unanticipated fashion. From early on it was clear that the bad blood would not adversely impact the fight, as both men fought strong technical fights.

During the early rounds, Garcia steadily pulled ahead, outboxing Judah throughout. Judah was in serious trouble in rounds 5 and 6, then finally went down in the 8th. From there, things took a surprising turn. Never known for his resolve or ability to turn the fight around late, Judah responded to the knockdown by coming on strong down the stretch. Judah took the last 3 rounds, though his deficit from earlier in the fight meant it wasn't enough and Garcia defeated Judah by unanimous decision (115–112, 114–112, 116–111).

=== Second return to welterweight ===
==== Judah vs. Malignaggi ====
Judah fought former welterweight titlist Paulie Malignaggi December 7, 2013 at the Barclays Center for the vacant NABF welterweight title. Judah started well, winning the first three rounds with a sharp jab, also dropping Malignaggi in the second round. The rest of the fight saw Malignaggi hitting quick jabs outpointing Judah. The fight went the 12 round distance as the judges scored it 116–111, 117–110 and 117–110 all in Malignaggi's favor. Due to the lack of action in the fight, the crowd booed as the fight ended. The fight was for the "King of Brooklyn" belt and local bragging rights.

=== Return from hiatus ===
In early January 2017, Judah announced that he would have his first fight in over 3 years on January 21 when he fights journeyman Jorge Luis Munguia (12–7, 4 KOs) in a scheduled 10 round bout at Sun National Bank Center in Trenton, New Jersey. The bout was an Internet-only pay per view. As expected, Judah won the bout via 2nd-round TKO. Judah connected with power shots from the opening bell, landed a left hook to the head of Munguia in round 2 which dropped it on his back. The referee stopped the fight at 1 minute and 27 seconds of the round. A year later on January 27, 2018, Judah returned to the ring at the Grey Eagle Resort and Casino in Calgary, Alberta, Canada and fought Mexican boxer Noel Mejia Rincon (21–14–1, 12 KOs) over 10 rounds. Judah's entrance included a light show, as well as showcasing some of the world titles he had won during his career. The fight went the 10 round distance with Judah winning 99–91 on all three judges scorecards. Apart from being hurt once towards the end of round 6 following some body shots, Judah started the first round at a steady pace but controlled the remainder of the fight.

=== Final return to light welterweight ===
==== Judah versus Seldin ====
After seventeen months of inactivity, and in only his third bout in six years, on June 7, 2019, at Turning Stone Resort Casino in Verona, New York, Zab Judah, age 41, was stopped in the eleventh round of a scheduled 12 rounder for the vacant NABA Super Lightweight title by Cletus Seldin. Judah felt faint after the bout, and was hospitalized and treated for a brain bleed, likely ending his boxing career. He was subsequently released from the hospital and recovered.

== Personal life ==
Judah has ten brothers and four sisters. Five of his brothers also box, with three of them, Josiah, Joseph and Daniel Judah, boxing professionally. Judah's father and trainer, Yoel Judah, is a six-time kickboxing world champion and a ninth degree black belt. Judah's father is an avowed Black Hebrew Israelite and Judah's family has declared themselves Jewish. Judah thanked "his Lord and Savior Jesus Christ" after his 2005 fight against Spinks. Judah is now a born-again Christian.

In July 2006, he was arrested after a celebrity basketball game at Madison Square Garden on a Family Court warrant. In August 2007, Judah became involved in a fight at Stereo nightclub in New York. According to the New York Daily News, Judah started throwing punches after he was hit first by someone who approached him. Two of the perpetrator's friends then joined in the fight and eventually everyone involved were kicked out of the club. After reviewing the videotape, the club indicated the perpetrators "might have been plotting something."

New York Police linked rapper Fabolous to a crew of robbers who targeted Judah twice. According to police reports, the Street Fam Crew, the gang which attempted to rob Judah, was made up of 20 members, all former drug dealers from Fabolous' Brooklyn neighborhood. In 2006, three men tried to rob Judah as he stood next to his Lamborghini on West 27th Street at 10th Avenue in New York City. The three men drove up to Judah in a minivan at about 5 am, and came out. One man pulled a handgun on Judah, and told him to put his jewelry on the hood of his car. Judah ran from the scene instead. The muggers followed in their minivan, but crashed into a tree a block away. All three robbers fled the scene. One was captured by a Homeland Security agent on his way to work, and another was grabbed by a nearby cab driver.

Judah also volunteers teaching a nursing assistance class and helps at an adult day care facility treating patients with dementia.

== Professional boxing record ==
56 fights	44 wins	10 losses
By knockout	30	4
By decision	14	6
No contests	2	

No.	Result	Record	Opponent	Type	Round, time	Date	Location	Notes
56	Loss	44–10 (2)	Cletus Seldin	TKO	11 (12), 1:40	Jun 7, 2019	Turning Stone Resort & Casino, Verona, New York, U.S.	For vacant NABA light welterweight title
55	Win	44–9 (2)	Noel Mejia Rincon	UD	10	Jan 27, 2018	Grey Eagle Resort & Casino, Calgary, Alberta, Canada	
54	Win	43–9 (2)	Jorge Luis Munguia	TKO	2 (10), 1:27	Jan 21, 2017	Sun National Bank Center, Trenton, New Jersey, U.S.	
53	Loss	42–9 (2)	Paulie Malignaggi	UD	12	Dec 7, 2013	Barclays Center, New York City, New York, U.S.	For vacant NABF welterweight title
52	Loss	42–8 (2)	Danny Garcia	UD	12	Apr 27, 2013	Barclays Center, New York City, New York, U.S.	For WBA (Super), WBC, and The Ring light welterweight titles
51	Win	42–7 (2)	Vernon Paris	TKO	9 (12), 2:07	Mar 24, 2012	Aviator Sports & Events Center, New York City, New York, U.S.	
50	Loss	41–7 (2)	Amir Khan	KO	5 (12), 2:47	Jul 23, 2011	Mandalay Bay Events Center, Paradise, Nevada, U.S.	Lost IBF light welterweight title; For WBA (Super) light welterweight title
49	Win	41–6 (2)	Kaizer Mabuza	TKO	7 (12), 0:59	Mar 5, 2011	Prudential Center, Newark, New Jersey, U.S.	Won vacant IBF light welterweight title
48	Win	40–6 (2)	Lucas Matthysse	SD	12	Nov 6, 2010	Prudential Center, Newark, New Jersey, U.S.	Won vacant NABO light welterweight title
47	Win	39–6 (2)	José Santa Cruz	TKO	3 (10), 2:33	Jul 16, 2010	Prudential Center, Newark, New Jersey, U.S.	
46	Win	38–6 (2)	Ubaldo Hernandez	TKO	2 (10), 0:35	Nov 6, 2009	Palms Casino Resort, Paradise, Nevada, U.S.	
45	Win	37–6 (2)	Ernest Johnson	UD	10	Nov 8, 2008	Madison Square Garden, New York City, New York, U.S.	
44	Loss	36–6 (2)	Joshua Clottey	TD	9 (12), 1:12	Aug 2, 2008	Pearl Concert Theater, Paradise, Nevada, U.S.	For vacant IBF welterweight title; Unanimous TD: Judah cut from an accidental head clash
43	Win	36–5 (2)	Ryan Davis	UD	12	Nov 17, 2007	Casablanca Casino, Providenciales, Turks and Caicos Islands	Won vacant IBC light middleweight title
42	Win	35–5 (2)	Edwin Vasquez	UD	10	Sep 7, 2007	Hard Rock Hotel and Casino, Biloxi, Mississippi, U.S.	
41	Loss	34–5 (2)	Miguel Cotto	TKO	11 (12), 0:49	Jun 9, 2007	Madison Square Garden, New York City, New York, U.S.	For WBA welterweight title
40	NC	34–4 (2)	Rubén Galván	NC	1 (10), 1:11	Apr 13, 2007	Fitzgeralds Casino and Hotel, Tunica Resorts, Mississippi, U.S.	Galván cut from an accidental elbow
39	Loss	34–4 (1)	Floyd Mayweather Jr.	UD	12	Apr 8, 2006	Thomas & Mack Center, Paradise, Nevada, U.S.	Lost IBF welterweight title; For vacant IBO welterweight title
38	Loss	34–3 (1)	Carlos Baldomir	UD	12	Jan 7, 2006	Madison Square Garden, New York City, New York, U.S.	Lost WBC and The Ring welterweight titles
37	Win	34–2 (1)	Cosme Rivera	TKO	3 (12), 2:11	May 14, 2005	MGM Grand Garden Arena, Paradise, Nevada, U.S.	Retained WBA (Undisputed), WBC, IBF, and The Ring welterweight titles
36	Win	33–2 (1)	Cory Spinks	TKO	9 (12), 2:49	Feb 5, 2005	Savvis Center, St. Louis, Missouri, U.S.	Won WBA (Undisputed), WBC, IBF, and The Ring welterweight titles
35	Win	32–2 (1)	Wayne Martell	TKO	1 (12), 2:08	Oct 2, 2004	Madison Square Garden, New York City, New York, U.S.	Retained WBO Inter-Continental welterweight title
34	Win	31–2 (1)	Rafael Pineda	SD	12	May 15, 2004	Mandalay Bay Events Center, Paradise, Nevada, U.S.	Won vacant WBO Inter-Continental welterweight title
33	Loss	30–2 (1)	Cory Spinks	UD	12	Apr 10, 2004	Mandalay Bay Events Center, Paradise, Nevada, U.S.	For WBA (Undisputed), WBC, IBF, and The Ring welterweight titles
32	Win	30–1 (1)	Jaime Rangel	KO	1 (12), 1:12	Dec 13, 2003	Boardwalk Hall, Atlantic City, New Jersey, U.S.	Retained WBO light welterweight title
31	Win	29–1 (1)	DeMarcus Corley	SD	12	Jul 12, 2003	The Orleans, Paradise, Nevada, U.S.	Won WBO light welterweight title
30	Win	28–1 (1)	Omar Gabriel Weis	UD	10	Jul 13, 2002	Sam's Town Gambling Hall, Kansas City, Missouri, U.S.	
29	Loss	27–1 (1)	Kostya Tszyu	TKO	2 (12), 2:59	Nov 3, 2001	MGM Grand Garden Arena, Paradise, Nevada, U.S.	Lost IBF light welterweight title; For WBA (Super) and WBC light welterweight titles
28	Win	27–0 (1)	Allan Vester	KO	3 (12), 2:58	Jun 23, 2001	Mohegan Sun Arena, Montville, Connecticut, U.S.	Retained IBF light welterweight title
27	Win	26–0 (1)	Reggie Green	TKO	10 (12), 1:29	Jan 13, 2001	Mohegan Sun Arena, Montville, Connecticut, U.S.	Retained IBF light welterweight title
26	Win	25–0 (1)	Hector Quiroz	TKO	8 (12), 1:56	Oct 20, 2000	The Palace, Auburn Hills, Michigan, U.S.	Retained IBF light welterweight title
25	Win	24–0 (1)	Terron Millett	TKO	4 (12), 2:47	Aug 5, 2000	Mohegan Sun Arena, Montville, Connecticut, U.S.	Retained IBF light welterweight title
24	Win	23–0 (1)	Junior Witter	UD	12	Jun 24, 2000	Hampden Park, Glasgow, Scotland	Retained IBF light welterweight title
23	Win	22–0 (1)	Jan Piet Bergman	KO	4 (12), 2:50	Feb 12, 2000	Mohegan Sun Arena, Montville, Connecticut, U.S.	Won vacant IBF light welterweight title
22	Win	21–0 (1)	David Sample	TKO	1 (10), 2:27	Jul 9, 1999	Cape Cod Melody Tent, Hyannis, Massachusetts, U.S.	
21	Win	20–0 (1)	Juan Torres	KO	1 (10), 1:26	Apr 16, 1999	Grand Casino, Tunica Resorts, Mississippi, U.S.	
20	Win	19–0 (1)	Wilfredo Negron	KO	4 (12), 1:44	Jan 16, 1999	MGM Grand Garden Arena, Paradise, Nevada, U.S.	Won IBF interim light welterweight title
19	Win	18–0 (1)	Darryl Tyson	TKO	11 (12), 2:39	Oct 15, 1998	Hilton, Washington, D.C., U.S.	Retained USBA interim light welterweight title
18	Win	17–0 (1)	Otilio Villarreal	TKO	2 (10), 3:00	Jul 12, 1998	Cape Cod Melody Tent, Hyannis, Massachusetts, U.S.	
17	Win	16–0 (1)	Micky Ward	UD	12	Jun 7, 1998	Miccosukee Resort & Gaming, Miami, Florida, U.S.	Won vacant USBA interim light welterweight title
16	Win	15–0 (1)	Angel Beltre	KO	2 (8), 2:08	Apr 14, 1998	Foxwoods Resort Casino, Ledyard, Connecticut, U.S.	
15	NC	14–0 (1)	Esteban Flores	NC	3 (8), 1:24	Mar 10, 1998	Armory, Pikesville, Maryland, U.S.	Originally TD after Flores was cut from an accidental head clash, later ruled NC
14	Win	14–0	Steve Valdez	TKO	1 (8), 3:00	Jan 17, 1998	Boardwalk Hall, Atlantic City, New Jersey, U.S.	
13	Win	13–0	Anthony Johnson	UD	8	Dec 13, 1997	Foxwoods Resort Casino, Ledyard, Connecticut, U.S.	
12	Win	12–0	Ricardo Vazquez	TKO	1 (8), 1:35	Nov 7, 1997	Bally's Las Vegas, Paradise, Nevada, U.S.	
11	Win	11–0	Rick Edson	UD	6	Oct 17, 1997	Foxwoods Resort Casino, Ledyard, Connecticut, U.S.	
10	Win	10–0	James Salava	TKO	1 (6)	Oct 3, 1997	Tropicana Casino & Resort, Atlantic City, New Jersey, U.S.	
9	Win	9–0	Cesar Castro	KO	1 (6)	Aug 24, 1997	The Roxy, Boston, Massachusetts, U.S.	
8	Win	8–0	Omar Vasquez	UD	4	Jun 10, 1997	Travis County Expo Center, Austin, Texas, U.S.	
7	Win	7–0	Troy Cain	UD	6	May 4, 1997	Circus Maximus Showroom, Atlantic City, New Jersey, U.S.	
6	Win	6–0	Paul Denard	TKO	4 (6), 1:28	Apr 5, 1997	Bally's Park Place, Atlantic City, New Jersey, U.S.	
5	Win	5–0	Chris Slaughter	KO	1 (10)	Feb 22, 1997	Convention Hall, Atlantic City, New Jersey, U.S.	
4	Win	4–0	John Scalzi	TKO	1 (4)	Jan 24, 1997	Convention Hall, Atlantic City, New Jersey, U.S.	
3	Win	3–0	Jose Luis Torres	TKO	1 (4)	Dec 14, 1996	Convention Hall, Atlantic City, New Jersey, U.S.	
2	Win	2–0	Pablo Tejada	TKO	4 (4)	Oct 4, 1996	Madison Square Garden, New York City, New York, U.S.	
1	Win	1–0	Michael Johnson	TKO	2 (4), 0:36	Sep 20, 1996	James L. Knight Center, Miami, Florida, U.S.	

== Titles in boxing ==
=== Major world titles ===
- IBF light welterweight champion (140 lbs) (2×)
- WBO light welterweight champion (140 lbs)
- WBA (Undisputed) welterweight champion (147 lbs)
- WBC welterweight champion (147 lbs)
- IBF welterweight champion (147 lbs)

=== The Ring magazine titles ===
- The Ring welterweight champion (147 lbs)

=== Major interim world titles ===
- IBF interim light welterweight champion (140 lbs)

=== Minor world titles ===
- IBC light middleweight champion (154 lbs)

=== Regional/International titles ===
- NABO light welterweight champion (140 lbs)
- WBO Inter-Continental welterweight champion (147 lbs)

=== Regional interim titles ===
- USBA interim light welterweight champion (140 lbs)

=== Undisputed titles ===
- Undisputed welterweight champion

== Pay-per-view bouts ==
Date	Fight	Billing	Buys	Network	Revenue
April 8, 2006	Mayweather vs. Judah	Sworn Enemies	374,000	HBO	$16,800,000

== See also ==
- Notable boxing families
- List of WBA world champions
- List of WBC world champions
- List of IBF world champions
- List of WBO world champions
- List of The Ring world champions
- List of undisputed boxing champions

== Notes ==
Sporting positions
Regional boxing titles
Vacant Title last held by Darryl Tyson	USBA junior welterweight champion Interim title June 7, 1998 – January 16, 1999; Won IBF interim title	Vacant
Vacant Title last held by Sebastián Andrés Luján	WBO Inter-Continental welterweight champion May 15, 2004 – February 2005; Vacated	Vacant Title next held by Jan Zaveck
Vacant Title last held by Paulie Malignaggi	NABO junior welterweight champion November 6, 2010 – March 2011; Vacated	Vacant Title next held by Karim Mayfield
Minor world boxing titles
Vacant Title last held by Michael Rask	IBC junior middleweight champion November 17, 2007 – August 2008; Vacated	Vacant Title next held by Damian Jonak
Major world boxing titles
New title	IBF junior welterweight champion Interim title January 16, 1999 – February 12, 2000; Won full title	Vacant Title next held by Sharmba Mitchell
Vacant Title last held by Terron Millett	IBF junior welterweight champion February 12, 2000 – November 3, 2001	Succeeded by Kostya Tszyu
Preceded by DeMarcus Corley	WBO junior welterweight champion July 12, 2003 – June 18, 2004; Vacated	Vacant Title next held by Miguel Cotto
Preceded by Cory Spinks	WBA welterweight champion Undisputed title February 5, 2005 – January 7, 2006; Stripped	Succeeded by Luis Collazo as champion
Preceded by Cory Spinks	WBC welterweight champion February 5, 2005 – January 7, 2006	Succeeded by Carlos Baldomir
Preceded by Cory Spinks	IBF welterweight champion February 5, 2005 – April 8, 2006	Succeeded by Floyd Mayweather Jr.
Preceded by Cory Spinks	The Ring welterweight champion February 5, 2005 – January 7, 2006	Succeeded by Carlos Baldomir
Preceded by Cory Spinks	Undisputed welterweight champion February 5, 2005 – January 7, 2006; Titles fragmented	Vacant Title next held by Terence Crawford
Vacant Title last held by Devon Alexander	IBF junior welterweight champion March 5, 2011 – July 23, 2011	Succeeded by Amir Khan
