= Yoel Judah =

Kickboxer

- Born: July 23, 1956 (age 70)
- Known for: three-time world champion kickboxer; boxing trainer and manager
- Children: Zab Judah, Daniel Judah, and Josiah Judah

Yoel Judah (born July 23, 1956) is the eldest member of the Brooklyn-based Judah boxing family. He has been a martial artist, three-time world champion kickboxer, and boxing trainer and manager.

== Boxing and kickboxing career ==
Johnny Saxton, who twice won the world welterweight championship, was Judah's uncle. Judah had a brief boxing career in the 1980s, going 1–1 in two fights. He is also a 9th-degree black belt and former three-time world kickboxing champion, trained at one point by Billy Slinker.

== Training and managing career ==
He has been the trainer and manager of his sons Zab Judah, Daniel Judah, and Josiah Judah. He has also trained heavyweight Shannon Briggs.

=== Melee, license revocation, fine, and aftermath ===
He received national attention for his involvement in the melee in round 10 of the Floyd Mayweather Jr. vs. Zab Judah fight on April 8, 2006. After Zab hit Mayweather below the belt and with a rabbit punch, Roger Mayweather (Mayweather Jr.'s trainer) stormed the ring and went after Zab. Referee Richard Steele had Roger restrained until Yoel entered the ring and threw a right hand at Roger—an act that caused the ring to fill with Mayweather's camp members, security officers, and Las Vegas police. On May 8, 2006, the Nevada State Athletic Commission fined Yoel $100,000 and revoked his training license for one year.

When Zab Judah was involved in a later controversy, this time the recipient of what his angry cornerman Tommy Smalls believed were flagrant low blows by WBA welterweight champion Miguel Cotto in their June 9, 2007, fight before a sold-out crowd at Madison Square Garden, the father this time played a calming role, telling Smalls "What's done is done."

== Religion ==
The Judahs are Black Hebrews, and often attend Jewish Sabbath services. Judah is an avowed Hebrew Israelite, and Judah's family has declared themselves Jewish.

== See also ==
- List of male kickboxers
- Notable boxing families
