= Allan Vester =

Danish boxer

Personal information
- Nationality: Danish
- Born: 13 August 1977 (age 49) Aarhus, Denmark

Boxing career
- Stance: Orthodox

Boxing record
- Total fights: 35
- Wins: 28
- Win by KO: 5
- Losses: 7
- Draws: 1

Alan Vester (born 13 august 1977 in Aarhus) is a super lightweight Danish boxer who turned pro in 1998. He challenged once for the IBF World Super Lightweight title in 2001.

== Professional boxing record ==
36 fights	28 wins	7 losses
By knockout	5	7
By decision	23	0
Draws	1	

No.	Result	Record	Opponent	Type	Round, time	Date	Location	Notes
36	Loss	28-7-1	(Sweden) Cliff Soukka	RTD	4 (6)	Sep 24 2010	Sundsta Idrottshus, Karlstad, Sweden	
35	Win	28-6-1	(Tanzania) Pascal Kimaru Bruno	UD	4	Sep 5 2008	Nojesfabriken, Karlstad, Sweden	
34	Win	27-6-1	(Sweden) Hassan Saku	UD	6	Apr 4 2008	NRGi Arena, Aarhus, Denmark	
33	Win	26-6-1	(Austria) Gotthard Hinteregger	UD	4	Sep 15 2007	Lofbergs Arena, Karlstad, Sweden	
32	Loss	25-6-1	(Republic of Ireland) Eamonn Magee	TKO	3 (12)	Mar 18 2005	King's Hall, Belfast, United Kingdom	World Boxing Union (Original 1995-2004) Welterweight Title
31	Win	25-5-1	(Czech Republic) Petr Rykala	KO	6 (6)	Nov 28 2004	Center Thyregod, Thyregod, Denmark	
30	Loss	24-5-1	(Mexico) Miguel Ángel Huerta	TKO	9 (12)	Apr 23 2004	Harborside Events Center, Fort Myers, United States	
29	Loss	24-4-1	(Poland) Rafal Jackiewicz	KO	1 (6)	Oct 4 2003	Stadthalle, Zwickau, Germany	
28	Win	24-3-1	(Netherlands) Akunel Dias	UD	12	May 16, 2003	Congres Centrum, Den Haag, Netherlands	IBF Inter-Continental Super Lightweight Title
27	Win	22-4-1	(Estonia) Leonti Vorontsuk	UD	6	Apr 25 2003	Maritim Hotel, Magdeburg, Germany	
26	Win	21-4-1	(South Africa) Lawrence Ngobeni	UD	12	Nov 15 2002	Kjelleruphallen, Kjellerup, Denmark	vacant IBF Inter-Continental Super Lightweight Title
25	Win	20-4-1	(Austria) Joszef Brayer	KO	4 (6)	Oct 11 2002	Thyhallen, Thisted, Denmark	
24	Win	19-4-1	(Germany) Turgay Uzun	UD	8	Sep 13 2002	Stadionhal, Aarhus, Denmark	
23	Loss	18-4-1	(Italy) Gianluca Branco	TKO	10 (12)	Mar 9 2002	Montecatini Terme, Italy	EBU (European) Super Lightweight Title
22	Win	18-3-1	(France) Mourad Fantazi	PTS	6	Nov 30 2001	Jetsmarkhallen, Pandrup, Denmark	
21	Loss	17-3-1	(France) Carlos Fernandes	TKO	3 (12)	Apr 12 2001	Herning Kongrescenter, Herning, Denmark	
20	Loss	17-2-1	(United States) Zab Judah	KO	3 (12)	Jun 23 2001	Mohegan Sun Casino, Uncasville, United States	IBF World Super Lightweight Title
19	Win	16-2-1	(Sweden) George Scott	MD	12	Feb 23 2001	Stadionhal, Aarhus, Denmark	IBF Inter-Continental Super Lightweight Title
7	Win	7–0–0	(France) Fabrice Colombel	UD	6	Jan 22 1999	Jetsmarkhallen, Pandrup, Denmark	
6	Win	6–0–0	(Hungary) Lajos Nagy	UD	8	Nov 17 1998	Stadionhal, Aarhus, Denmark	
5	Win	5–0–0	(Mexico) Hector Ulises Chong	UD	6	Oct 30 1998	Odense Idrætshal, Odense, Denmark	
4	Win	4–0–0	(Hungary) Gábor Munkácsy	UD	4	Aug 28 1998	Stadionhal, Aarhus, Denmark	
3	Win	3–0–0	(Germany) Raik Schultgen	KO	1 (6) 1:24	Jul 22 1998	Outrup Speedwaybane, Outrup, Denmark	
2	Win	2–0–0	(Slovakia) Péter Fehér	UD	4	May 8, 1998	Parkhallen, Horsens, Denmark	
1	Win	1–0–0	(Romania) Mihai Andrei	UD	4	Mar 27 1998	Stadionhal, Aarhus, Denmark	Professional debut
