= Carlos Baldomir =

Argentine boxer (born 1971)

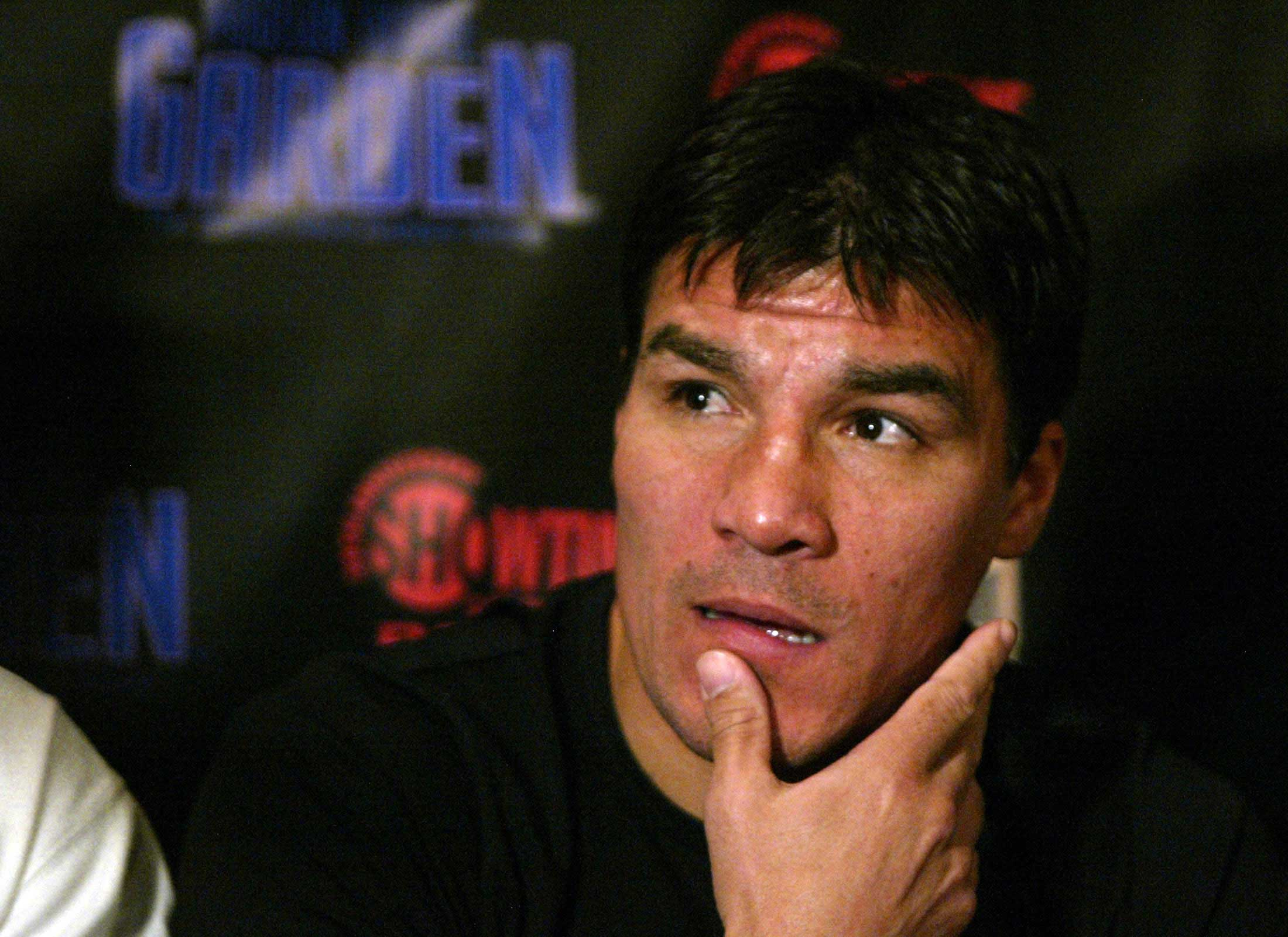
- Baldomir in 2006

Personal information
- Nickname: Tata
- Born: Carlos Manuel Baldomir; April 30, 1971 (age 55) Santa Fe, Argentina
- Weight: Welterweight; Light middleweight; Middleweight; Super middleweight

Boxing career
- Stance: Orthodox

Boxing record
- Total fights: 71
- Wins: 49
- Win by KO: 15
- Losses: 16
- Draws: 6

Carlos Manuel Baldomir (born April 30, 1971) is an Argentine former professional boxer who competed from 1993 to 2014. He held the unified IBF, WBC, The Ring, and lineal welterweight titles in 2006, and challenged once for the WBC super welterweight title in 2007. On July 31, 2019, Baldomir was sentenced to 18 years in prison for molesting his 8 year old daughter over a period of 2 years. In March 2020, false rumors spread that Baldomir had been killed in a prison riot after a picture was shared online of a deceased prisoner that bore a striking resemblance to the disgraced boxer.

== Professional career ==
=== WBC, The Ring, and lineal welterweight champion ===
Baldomir defeated Unified Welterweight Champion Zab Judah on January 7, 2006 in a mandatory challenge for Judah's title. The fight took place in Madison Square Garden, and with his pressure style and hard right hands Baldomir won a unanimous decision (115-113, 114-113 and 115-112). Baldomir was crowned World Champion, after 6 months of preparations in Los Angeles with Amílcar Brusa. After the fight, he said "This is a tribute to [Argentine boxing legend] Monzón" who had died eleven years earlier on January 8.

Baldomir failed to pay sanctioning fees imposed by the WBA & IBF when he beat Zab Judah for the WBC title, so, nominally at least, Judah remained the IBF title holder, while the WBA championship reverted to another boxer, Luis Collazo. (The SHOWTIME broadcast mentioned that Baldomir chose not to pay the sanctioning fees for the other organizations, out of loyalty to the WBC, which gave him the opportunity to fight for a world title by naming him the mandatory challenger to Judah.) He would have liked to pay all of the fees, but he would have lost money if he did (the fees were more than he was being paid for the fight). Despite this separation of the three title belts, Baldomir was universally regarded as the true Welterweight Champion since he defeated Judah, the recognized lineal champion.

=== Baldomir vs. Gatti ===
On July 22, 2006 Baldomir successfully defended his WBC Welterweight title and won the IBA welterweight title by defeating fan favorite Arturo Gatti by TKO in the 9th round by overpowering the faster, but naturally smaller Gatti. This fight helped convince some skeptics that Baldomir's win over Judah was no fluke. Baldomir then expressed a desire to fight Floyd Mayweather Jr. to continue his unlikely rise in the welterweight division.

=== Baldomir vs. Mayweather Jr. ===
Baldomir would eventually get his chance against the pound-for-pound king, Floyd Mayweather Jr., on November 4, 2006, in Las Vegas, for the WBC, The Ring, and lineal welterweight titles. Regarding the challenge, Baldomir said, "Mayweather is very good, but I can beat him. I'm going right at him. I'm going to keep attacking and not give him a chance to breathe or move. Mayweather has never fought anyone like me before."

Baldomir ultimately lost the titles by unanimous decision. Ringside punch statistics showed Mayweather landing 199 of 458 punches, while Baldomir landed just 79 of 670. Baldomir was paid $1.6 million, a career-high purse.

During the fight, Baldomir chased Mayweather sluggishly, unable to land any meaningful shots, but trying to remain the busier fighter. Meanwhile, Mayweather picked him apart with sharp jabs and hooks, even managing to cut Baldomir over his left eye in the first round. This pattern continued throughout the fight, partly because Baldomir weighed in at 162 pounds compared to Mayweather’s 149 pounds, leading some to believe that Baldomir’s sole intention was to score a knockout. The defensively minded Mayweather, however—apparently not looking for a knockout or even to trade blows—put on what many observers called a "boxing clinic" to take Baldomir’s WBC and lineal welterweight titles in a lopsided 12-round decision.

Others, notably Larry Merchant, the famous HBO analyst at ringside, remarked during the fight, "Mayweather is the only major boxer I've ever seen boring enough that his audience walks out on him during one of his fights." The broadcast then showed a long line of people walking toward and out of the exits, including many celebrities. Two judges scored the fight 120–108 in favor of Mayweather, while the third scored it 118–110.

=== Baldomir vs. Forrest ===
Baldomir was challenged to fight by former champion, Shane Mosley, but HBO would not air the fight, so the concept was thrown aside. On July 28, on HBO's Boxing after Dark, he fought Vernon Forrest for the vacant WBC Light Middleweight championship, losing a lopsided, yet very exciting and competitive decision. In the post fight interview with Larry Merchant, he indicated that he would likely retire from boxing.

== Professional boxing record ==
71 fights	49 wins	16 losses
By knockout	15	3
By decision	33	13
By disqualification	1	0
Draws	6	

No.	Result	Record	Opponent	Type	Round, time	Date	Location	Notes
71	Loss	49–16–6	Andrey Meryasev	UD	10	Apr 25, 2014	Salón Diamante, Kanasín, Mexico	
70	Loss	49–15–6	Marco Antonio Rubio	RTD	4 (12), 3:00	Sep 8, 2012	Gimnasio Miguel Alemán Valdez, Celaya, Mexico	For vacant WBF (Federation) super middleweight title
69	Win	49–14–6	Gaston Vega	KO	6 (6), 2:59	Jul 6, 2012	Club Huracán, Villaguay, Argentina	
68	Loss	48–14–6	Billi Godoy	UD	10	Apr 14, 2012	Estadio Ruca Che, Neuquén, Argentina	For WBC Latino interim middleweight title
67	Win	48–13–6	Ruben Silva Diaz	UD	10	Jul 15, 2011	Estadio del Centro, Córdoba, Argentina	
66	Win	47–13–6	Eduardo Flores	UD	10	Jun 17, 2011	Polideportivo Municipal, San Rafael, Argentina	
65	Win	46–13–6	Amilcar Funes Melian	SD	10	Nov 19, 2010	Estadio Aldo Cantoni, San Juan, Argentina	
64	Loss	45–13–6	Canelo Álvarez	KO	6 (10), 2:58	Sep 18, 2010	Staples Center, Los Angeles, California, U.S.	For WBC Silver super welterweight title
63	Win	45–12–6	Jairo Jesus Siris	TKO	4 (10), 2:45	Nov 27, 2009	Centro Municipal No. 29, Santa Fe, Argentina	
62	Loss	44–12–6	Sugar Jackson	MD	12	Dec 20, 2008	Lotto Arena, Antwerp, Belgium	
61	Win	44–11–6	Luciano Perez	MD	10	Nov 23, 2007	Morongo Casino Resort & Spa, Cabazon, California, U.S.	
60	Loss	43–11–6	Vernon Forrest	UD	12	Jul 28, 2007	Emerald Queen Casino, Tacoma, Washington, U.S.	For vacant WBC super welterweight title
59	Loss	43–10–6	Floyd Mayweather Jr.	UD	12	Nov 4, 2006	Mandalay Bay Events Center, Paradise, Nevada, U.S.	Lost WBC, IBA, and The Ring welterweight titles; For IBO welterweight title
58	Win	43–9–6	Arturo Gatti	TKO	9 (12), 2:50	Jul 22, 2006	Boardwalk Hall, Atlantic City, New Jersey, U.S.	Retained WBC and The Ring welterweight titles; Won IBA welterweight title
57	Win	42–9–6	Zab Judah	UD	12	Jan 7, 2006	Madison Square Garden, New York City, New York, U.S.	Won WBC and The Ring welterweight titles
56	Win	41–9–6	Miguel Angel Rodriguez	UD	12	May 21, 2005	United Center, Chicago, Illinois, U.S.	
55	Win	40–9–6	Alpaslan Aguzum	TKO	8 (12)	Mar 27, 2004	Bördelandhalle, Magdeburg, Germany	Won WBC International welterweight title
54	Win	39–9–6	Edgar Ruiz	UD	10	Sep 20, 2003	Arrowhead Pond, Anaheim, California, U.S.	
53	Win	38–9–6	Verdell Smith	TKO	4 (8), 1:15	Jun 14, 2003	Arrowhead Pond, Anaheim, California, U.S.	
52	Win	37–9–6	David Ojeda	UD	8	Oct 12, 2002	Arrowhead Pond, Anaheim, California, U.S.	
51	Draw	36–9–6	Jose Luis Cruz	PTS	12	Mar 22, 2002	Mazatlán, Mexico	Retained WBC International welterweight title
50	Win	36–9–5	Paulo Sanchez	UD	10	Jan 12, 2002	Estadio F.A.B., Buenos Aires, Argentina	
49	Win	35–9–5	Hasan Al	UD	12	Oct 13, 2001	Parken Stadium, Copenhagen, Denmark	Retained WBC International welterweight title
48	Draw	34–9–5	Hasan Al	SD	12	Jun 16, 2001	Brøndby Hall, Brøndby, Denmark	Retained WBC International welterweight title
47	Win	34–9–4	Alex Carrillo Villa	KO	1 (10), 2:47	May 5, 2001	Casinos del Litoral, Corrientes, Argentina	
46	Win	33–9–4	Alpaslan Aguzum	TKO	1 (12)	Dec 16, 2000	Europahalle, Karlsruhe, Germany	Retained WBC International welterweight title
45	Win	32–9–4	Ruben Oliva	UD	10	Aug 11, 2000	Club Sportivo Ben Hur, Rafaela, Argentina	Won vacant Santa Fe welterweight title
44	Win	31–9–4	Alberto de las Mercedes Cortes	TD	8 (10)	Jul 14, 2000	Rosario, Argentina	
43	Win	30–9–4	Freddy Blanco Castello	RTD	7 (10), 0:42	Jun 9, 2000	Club Nolting, Ciudadela, Argentina	
42	Win	29–9–4	Joshua Clottey	DQ	12 (12), 2:30	Nov 29, 1999	Wembley Arena, London, England	Retained WBC International welterweight title; Won vacant IBC welterweight title; Clottey disqualified for repeated headbutts
41	Win	28–9–4	Adrian Daneff	RTD	8 (10)	Sep 17, 1999	Santa Fe, Argentina	
40	Win	27–9–4	Frank Olsen	TKO	10 (12)	Jun 18, 1999	Idrættens Hus, Vejle, Denmark	Retained WBC International welterweight title
39	Win	26–9–4	Dejan Zivkovic	TKO	8 (12)	Apr 22, 1999	Arezzo, Italy	Won vacant WBC International welterweight title
38	Win	25–9–4	Walter Saporiti	UD	10	Mar 19, 1999	Club Argentino, Quilmes, Argentina	
37	Loss	24–9–4	Alberto de las Mercedes Cortes	UD	8	Dec 11, 1998	ATC Studios, Buenos Aires, Argentina	
36	Draw	24–8–4	Dingaan Thobela	SD	12	Oct 28, 1998	Nasrec Indoor Arena, Johannesburg, South Africa	For vacant WBC International welterweight title
35	Loss	24–8–3	Sergio Ernesto Acuna	SD	12	Sep 12, 1998	Estadio F.A.B., Buenos Aires, Argentina	For ABF welterweight title
34	Win	24–7–3	Silvio Rojas	UD	8	Aug 8, 1998	Canal 9 Studios, Buenos Aires, Argentina	
33	Win	23–7–3	José Antonio Perez	UD	10	Jul 11, 1998	Buenos Aires, Argentina	
32	Loss	22–7–3	Søren Søndergaard	UD	12	Jun 5, 1998	K.B. Hallen, Copenhagen, Denmark	For vacant IBC welterweight title
31	Win	22–6–3	Daniel Cusato	TKO	3 (8), 2:33	Apr 18, 1998	Estadio F.A.B., Buenos Aires, Argentina	
30	Win	21–6–3	Ariel Arrieta	UD	10	Jan 31, 1998	Canal 9 Studios, Buenos Aires, Argentina	
29	Loss	20–6–3	Giorbis Barthelemy	UD	10	Oct 20, 1997	Great Western Forum, Inglewood, California, U.S.	
28	Win	20–5–3	Jose Antonio Perez	UD	10	Sep 20, 1997	Avellaneda, Argentina	
27	Win	19–5–3	José Rosa Gomez	UD	10	Aug 16, 1997	Estadio F.A.B., Buenos Aires, Argentina	
26	Win	18–5–3	Walter Saporiti	UD	8	Jun 7, 1997	Canal 9 Studios, Buenos Aires, Argentina	
25	Win	17–5–3	José Antonio Perez	UD	10	Apr 5, 1997	Buenos Aires, Argentina	
24	Draw	16–5–3	Silvio Peppino	PTS	8	Mar 8, 1997	Buenos Aires, Argentina	
23	Loss	16–5–2	Ariel Chaves	TD	7 (12)	Jan 17, 1997	Mar del Plata, Argentina	For ABF welterweight title
22	Loss	16–4–2	Ariel Chaves	TD	5 (12)	Oct 26, 1996	Santa Fe, Argentina	For ABF welterweight title
21	Win	16–3–2	Carlos Arrieta	KO	6 (10)	Aug 10, 1996	Buenos Aires, Argentina	
20	Win	15–3–2	Victor Balmaceda	KO	2 (10)	May 18, 1996	Buenos Aires, Argentina	
19	Win	14–3–2	Silvio Peppino	PTS	8	Apr 27, 1996	Buenos Aires, Argentina	
18	Loss	13–3–2	Silvio Peppino	PTS	8	Mar 15, 1996	Villa María, Argentina	
17	Win	13–2–2	José Magarino	KO	4 (8)	Nov 11, 1995	Buenos Aires, Argentina	
16	Win	12–2–2	Victor Hugo Cejas	PTS	8	Sep 23, 1995	Buenos Aires, Argentina	
15	Draw	11–2–2	Jose Luis Fernandez	PTS	8	Jul 21, 1995	San Carlos de Bolívar, Argentina	
14	Win	11–2–1	Silvio Rojas	PTS	8	May 27, 1995	Buenos Aires, Argentina	
13	Win	10–2–1	Victor Balmaceda	PTS	8	Mar 25, 1995	Buenos Aires, Argentina	
12	Win	9–2–1	Carlos Chavarria	PTS	6	Feb 17, 1995	Estadio Pascual Pérez, Mendoza, Argentina	
11	Win	8–2–1	Eduardo Molina	PTS	8	Dec 7, 1994	Buenos Aires, Argentina	
10	Loss	7–2–1	Victor Balmaceda	PTS	8	Nov 16, 1994	Buenos Aires, Argentina	
9	Win	7–1–1	Angel Rogel	PTS	8	Oct 8, 1994	Buenos Aires, Argentina	
8	Win	6–1–1	Carlos Montanez	PTS	6	Sep 3, 1994	Buenos Aires, Argentina	
7	Loss	5–1–1	Paulo Sanchez	KO	2 (8)	May 14, 1994	Estadio F.A.B., Buenos Aires, Argentina	
6	Win	5–0–1	Pablo Gomez	PTS	8	Apr 2, 1994	Estadio F.A.B., Buenos Aires, Argentina	
5	Win	4–0–1	Carlos More	UD	10	Dec 7, 1993	Santa Fe, Argentina	
4	Draw	3–0–1	Ramon Mercado	PTS	8	Oct 8, 1993	Tostado, Argentina	
3	Win	3–0	Oscar Romero	UD	8	Aug 7, 1993	Villa Trinidad, Santa Fe, Argentina	
2	Win	2–0	Carlos More	UD	6	Jul 16, 1993	Santa Fe, Argentina	
1	Win	1–0	Carlos More	UD	6	Feb 19, 1993	Santa Fe, Argentina	

== Pay-per-view bouts ==
Date	Fight	Billing	Buys	Network	Revenue
November 4, 2006	Mayweather vs. Baldomir	Pretty Risky	325,000	HBO	$16,300,000

== See also ==
- List of world welterweight boxing champions

Sporting positions
Regional boxing titles
Vacant Title last held by Stephane Cazeaux	WBC International welterweight champion April 22, 1999 – March 2002; Vacated	Vacant Title next held by Paolo Roberto
Preceded by Alpaslan Aguzum	WBC International welterweight champion March 27, 2004 – May 21, 2005; Won eliminator for world title	Vacant Title next held by Joseph Makaringe
Minor world boxing titles
Preceded by Arturo Gatti	IBA welterweight champion July 22, 2006 – November 4, 2006	Succeeded by Floyd Mayweather Jr.
Major world boxing titles
Preceded by Zab Judah	WBC welterweight champion January 7, 2006 – November 4, 2006	Succeeded by Floyd Mayweather Jr.
Preceded by Zab Judah	The Ring welterweight champion January 7, 2006 – November 4, 2006	Succeeded by Floyd Mayweather Jr.
Awards
Previous: Zahir Raheem; UD12 Érik Morales	The Ring Upset of the Year; UD12 Zab Judah; 2006	Next: Nonito Donaire; TKO5 Vic Darchinyan
