= Diosbelys Hurtado =

Cuban boxer (born 1973)

Personal information
- Nicknames: Black Money; The Oriental Kid
- Born: September 4, 1973 (age 52) Santiago de Cuba, Cuba
- Height: 5 ft 11 1/2 in (182 cm)
- Weight: Light welterweight; Welterweight

Boxing career
- Reach: 73 in (185 cm)
- Stance: Orthodox

Boxing record
- Total fights: 47
- Wins: 43
- Win by KO: 26
- Losses: 3
- Draws: 1

Diosbelys Hurtado (born September 4, 1973 in Santiago, Cuba) is a Cuban-Spanish boxer and former NBA, IBA and WBA Light Welterweight(super lightweight ) Champion.

== Amateur career ==
Amateur Record: 221-20

- 1990 Represented Cuba at the World Junior Championships in Lima, Peru as a Featherweight. His results were:
  - Defeated Bo Hum Baik (Korea) RSC-1
  - Defeated Paata Gvasalia (URS) 5-0
  - Lost to Alan Vaughan (England) 16-19
- 1994 Competed at the Cuban Nationals. His results were:
  - Defeated Joel Casamayor
  - Defeated Julio Gonzalez

== Professional career ==
Hurtado, known as "The Oriental Kid", began his professional career in 1994. He won the NBA title by beating Dezi Ford by 10th-round TKO. In 1997, he challenged WBC Welterweight title holder Pernell Whitaker but was TKO'd in the 11th round by Whitaker with Hurtado leading on all three judges' cards. In 1998, he fought Kostya Tszyu for the interim WBC Light Welterweight title. The fight featured a dramatic 1st round, in which Hurtado went down once and Tszyu went down twice. Tszyu won the fight via TKO in the 5th round. On January 4, 2002, he captured the IBA Light Welterweight title from Ricky Quiles then in his next match he won the Vacant WBA Light Welterweight title with a KO win over Randall Bailey. He then lost the 2 belts in his first defence to Vivian Harris via 2nd-round TKO. Having retired from boxing in 2004, he returned to the ring in December 2007, winning 2 unanimous decision's in a row over Rafael Chiruta and Eugen Stan, both of Romania.

== Comeback ==
Hurtado came back on April 3, 2009 to beat two-time world title challenger Arturo Morua by Split-Decision to win the vacant WBO Latino Welterweight title, Hurtado was in control until he was caught off balance and knocked down in the 1st round. Hurtado was cut over his right eyebrow and Morua on top of his forehead in the 5th round due to a clash of heads after that Moura had control (due to the profuse bleeding getting into Hurtado's eye) until the 6th round when Hurtado took back control and kept it until the 12th round when Moura would rally to take the round. The scores were 114-113 and 114-113 for Hurtado and 113-114 for Moura.

On June 12 Hurtado defeated Manuel Garnica by UD to retain his WBO Latino title. He returned on June 3, 2011 and defeated journeyman Raul Asencio by knockout in the fifth round and subsequently retired.

== Professional boxing record ==
47 fights	43 wins	3 losses
By knockout	26	3
By decision	17	0
Draws	1	

No.	Result	Record	Opponent	Type	Round, time	Date	Location	Notes
47	Win	43–3–1	Raul Asencio	KO	5 (6)	3 Jun 2011	Club Las Palmeras Golf, Las Palmas, Spain	
46	Win	42–3–1	Manuel Garnica	UD	12	12 Jun 2009	Miccosukee Resort & Gaming, Miami, Florida, U.S.	Retained WBO Latino welterweight title
45	Win	41–3–1	Arturo Morua	SD	12	3 Apr 2009	Miccosukee Resort & Gaming, Miami, Florida, U.S.	Won vacant WBO Latino welterweight title
44	Win	40–3–1	Eugen Stan	UD	6	7 Mar 2008	Pabellon Cabanal, Valencia, Spain	
43	Win	39–3–1	Rafael Chiruta	UD	6	15 Dec 2007	Polideportivo Municipal, Camargo, Spain	
42	Win	38–3–1	Leo Edwards	TKO	2 (8), 2:26	3 Jul 2004	American Airlines Arena, Miami, Florida, U.S.	
41	Win	37–3–1	Joshua Smith	UD	8	1 May 2004	Jai Alai Fronton, Miami, Florida, U.S.	
40	Win	36–3–1	Rudy Lovato	TKO	3 (8), 2:09	17 Oct 2003	St. Paul Armory, Saint Paul, Minnesota, U.S.	
39	Loss	35–3–1	Vivian Harris	TKO	2 (12), 0:43	19 Oct 2002	Reliant Park, Houston, Texas, U.S.	Lost WBA and IBA super lightweight titles
38	Win	35–2–1	Randall Bailey	KO	7 (12), 2:02	11 May 2002	Roberto Clemente Coliseum, San Juan, Puerto Rico	Retained IBA super lightweight title; Won vacant WBA super lightweight title
37	Win	34–2–1	Ricky Quiles	UD	12	4 Jan 2002	American Airlines Arena, Miami, Florida, U.S.	Won vacant IBA super lightweight title
36	Win	33–2–1	Henry Cokes	KO	1 (10)	21 Nov 2001	St. Paul Armory, Saint Paul, Minnesota, U.S.	
35	Win	32–2–1	Fray Luis Sierra	KO	1 (10), 1:50	28 Oct 2000	Miccosukee Resort & Gaming, Miami, Florida, U.S.	
34	Win	31–2–1	Cosme Rivera	UD	12	12 May 2000	Miccosukee Resort & Gaming, Miami, Florida, U.S.	Won IBA intercontinental super lightweight title
33	Draw	30–2–1	Ricardo Mayorga	TD	2 (10)	27 Nov 1999	Carolina, Puerto Rico	Fight stopped due to an accidental headbutt
32	Win	30–2	Dillon Carew	TKO	3 (10)	20 Nov 1999	Miccosukee Resort & Gaming, Miami, Florida, U.S.	
31	Win	29–2	Lonnie Smith	UD	10	19 Jun 1999	Miccosukee Resort & Gaming, Miami, Florida, U.S.	
30	Loss	28–2	Kostya Tszyu	TKO	5 (12), 2:35	28 Nov 1998	Fantasy Springs Resort Casino, Indio, California, U.S.	
29	Win	28–1	Manuel Gomez	UD	10	13 Nov 1998	Mahi Temple Shrine Auditorium, Miami, Florida, U.S.	
28	Win	27–1	Darryl Tyson	TKO	5 (10), 2:30	4 Sep 1998	Miccosukee Resort & Gaming, Miami, Florida, U.S.	
27	Win	26–1	Elias Quiroz	KO	1 (10), 2:13	24 Jul 1998	Miccosukee Resort & Gaming, Miami, Florida, U.S.	
26	Win	25–1	Leonardo Mas	TKO	3 (10), 1:07	7 Jun 1998	Miccosukee Resort & Gaming, Miami, Florida, U.S.	
25	Win	24–1	Harold Bennett	KO	2 (10)	13 Mar 1998	Miccosukee Resort & Gaming, Miami, Florida, U.S.	
24	Win	23–1	Aaron Zarate	KO	1 (10), 1:59	20 Jan 1998	Freeman Coliseum, San Antonio, Texas, U.S.	
23	Win	22–1	Emanuel Augustus	UD	10	2 Oct 1997	Miccosukee Resort & Gaming, Miami, Florida, U.S.	
22	Win	21–1	Jaime Balboa	TKO	9 (12)	21 Jun 1997	Sun Dome, Tampa, Florida, U.S.	Won WBC FECARBOX super lightweight title
21	Loss	20–1	Pernell Whitaker	TKO	11 (12)	24 Jan 1997	Convention Center, Atlantic City, New Jersey, U.S.	For WBC welterweight title
20	Win	20–0	Antonio Rivera	TKO	1 (10)	1 Nov 1996	Exhibition Center, Coconut Grove, Florida, U.S.	
19	Win	19–0	Ed Pollard	UD	8	20 Sep 1996	James L. Knight Center, Miami, Florida, U.S.	
18	Win	18–0	Cesar Flores	UD	8	6 Jun 1996	Aladdin Hotel & Casino, Paradise, Nevada, U.S.	
17	Win	17–0	Anthony Ivory	PTS	8	25 May 1996	Seville Beach Hotel, Miami Beach, Florida, U.S.	
16	Win	16–0	Elvin Gonzalez	KO	1 (8)	30 Mar 1996	Seville Beach Hotel, Miami Beach, Florida, U.S.	
15	Win	15–0	Dezi Ford	TKO	10 (12)	31 Dec 1995	Seville Beach Hotel, Miami Beach, Florida, U.S.	Won NBA super lightweight title
14	Win	14–0	Juan Galvan	KO	1 (8)	18 Nov 1995	Seville Beach Hotel, Miami Beach, Florida, U.S.	
13	Win	13–0	Javier Valadez	TKO	1 (6)	28 Oct 1995	Caesars Palace, Paradise, Nevada, U.S.	
12	Win	12–0	Tom Cisneros	KO	1 (6)	21 Oct 1995	Seville Beach Hotel, Miami Beach, Florida, U.S.	
11	Win	11–0	Damone Wright	PTS	6	9 Oct 1995	Great Western Forum, Inglewood, California, U.S.	
10	Win	10–0	Julio Melendez	TKO	1 (6)	8 Sep 1995	Seville Beach Hotel, Miami Beach, Florida, U.S.	
9	Win	9–0	Macario Davila	TKO	1 (6)	18 Aug 1995	Aladdin Hotel & Casino, Paradise, Nevada, U.S.	
8	Win	8–0	Mark Tang	KO	4 (?)	24 Jul 1995	Great Western Forum, Inglewood, California, U.S.	
7	Win	7–0	Francisco Rodriguez	PTS	6	21 Jun 1995	Warner Center Marriott, Woodland Hills, California, U.S.	
6	Win	6–0	Rafael Rodriguez	KO	3 (6)	3 Jun 1995	Seville Beach Hotel, Miami Beach, Florida, U.S.	
5	Win	5–0	Rafael Rodriguez	KO	3 (6)	29 Apr 1995	Seville Beach Hotel, Miami Beach, Florida, U.S.	
4	Win	4–0	Tommy Eaglin	PTS	6	25 Mar 1995	Seville Beach Hotel, Miami Beach, Florida, U.S.	
3	Win	3–0	Ramon Gomez	KO	5 (6)	25 Feb 1995	Seville Beach Hotel, Miami Beach, Florida, U.S.	
2	Win	2–0	Darrell Walker	KO	2 (?)	27 Jan 1995	Seville Beach Hotel, Miami Beach, Florida, U.S.	
1	Win	1–0	Heriberto Sosa	UD	4	16 Dec 1994	Seville Beach Hotel, Miami Beach, Florida, U.S.	

== See also ==
- List of world light-welterweight boxing champions

Sporting positions
Regional boxing titles
Vacant Title last held by Leonardo Mas	WBC FECARBOX light-welterweight champion June 21, 1997 – November 28, 1998; Failed to win interim world title	Vacant Title next held by Juan Paz
Vacant Title last held by Alfonso Sánchez	IBA Intercontinental light-welterweight champion May 12, 2000 – January 4, 2002; Won IBA world title	Vacant Title next held by Randall Bailey
Vacant Title last held by Canelo Álvarez	WBO Latino welterweight champion April 3, 2009 – 2009; Vacated	Vacant Title next held by Antonio Pitalúa
Minor World boxing titles
Vacant Title last held by Alex Trujillo	IBA light-welterweight champion January 4, 2002 – October 19, 2002	Succeeded by Vivian Harris
Major World boxing titles
New title	WBA light-welterweight champion Regular title May 11, 2002 – October 19, 2002	Succeeded by Vivian Harris
