= Cosme Rivera =

Mexican boxer (born 1976)

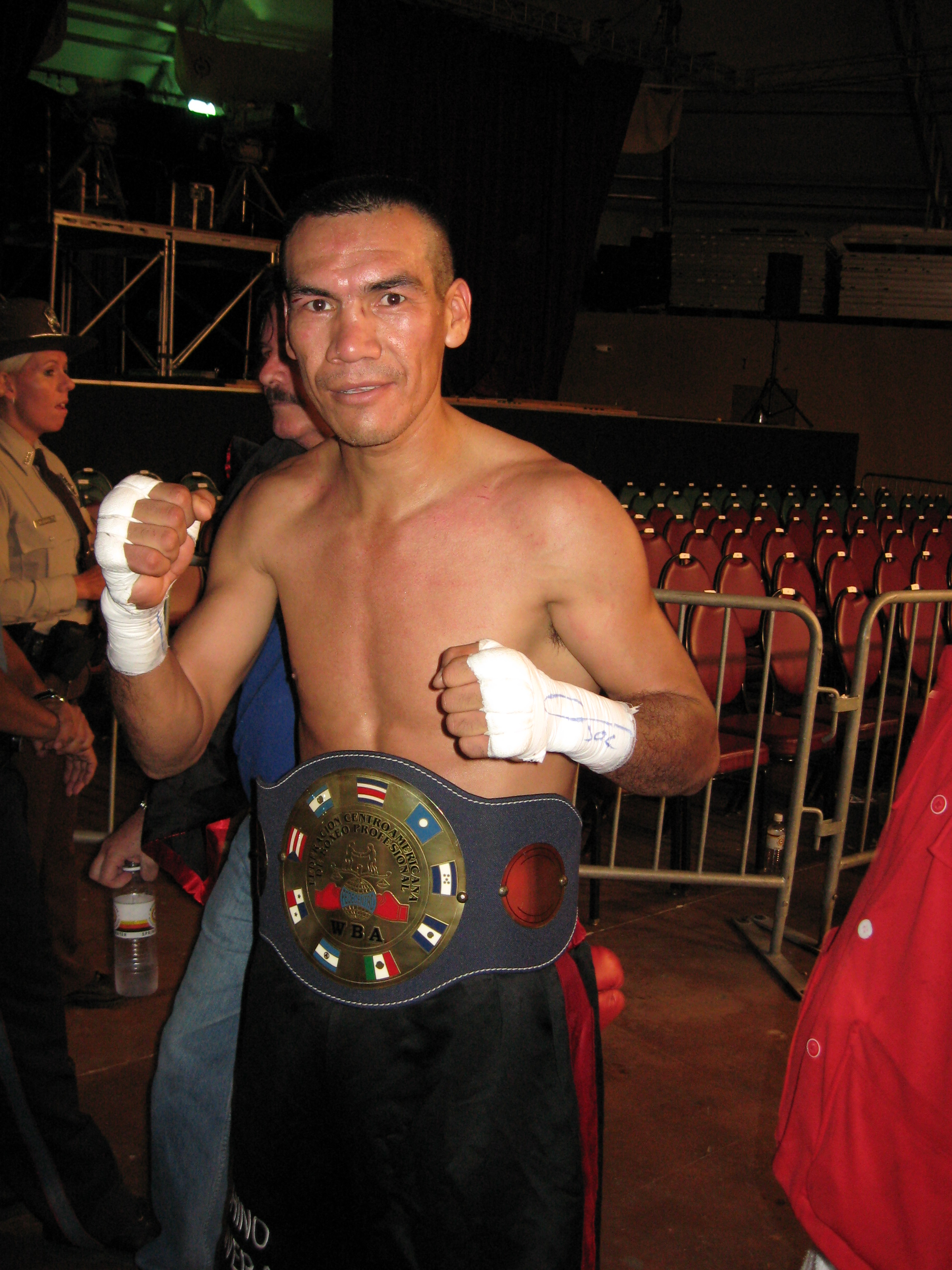
- Rivera in 2008

Personal information
- Nickname: Chino
- Born: 19 July 1976 (age 49) Huatabampo, Sonora, Mexico
- Weight: Light welterweight Welterweight

Boxing career
- Stance: Orthodox

Boxing record
- Total fights: 88
- Wins: 43
- Win by KO: 28
- Losses: 40
- Draws: 4
- No contests: 1

Cosme Rivera Yucupicio (born 19 July 1976) is a Mexican professional boxer. He held the WBO–NABO light welterweight title in 1999, the WBC Continental Americas light welterweight title in 2002, the WBA Fedecentro & WBO Latino welterweight titles in 2006 and the WBC Latino light welterweight title in 2011. He also fought for a unified welterweight world title in 2005.

== Career ==
Rivera initially played baseball in his native city of Huatabampo. He began boxing at the age of 15, sneaking out of the house to train at a local gymnasium. In his three years as an amateur, he only had nine bouts.

Rivera had a draw in his professional debut on January 1, 1993 vs. Cachorron Diaz.

Rivera got his first title fight on November 22, 1996 vs. Luis Alejandro Ugalde (7-0) in Tijuana, Mexico for the Baja California State Light Welterweight Title, winning by point in 12 rounds.

In 2003, he knocked out a previously undefeated James Hare in England.

== Professional boxing record ==
| 88 fights | 43 wins | 40 losses |
|---|---|---|
| By knockout | 29 | 19 |
| By decision | 14 | 21 |
| Draws | 4 | |
| No contests | 1 | |

| No. | Result | Record | Opponent | Type | Round, time | Date | Location | Notes |
|---|---|---|---|---|---|---|---|---|
| 88 | Loss | 43–40–4 (1) | Francisco Javier Sandoval | TKO | 2 (8), 2:59 | 7 Jun 2025 | Los Cabos, Baja California Sur, Mexico | |
| 87 | Loss | 43–39–4 (1) | Jesús Madueno Angulo | TKO | 7 (10), 0:10 | 5 Nov 2022 | Guasave, Sinaloa, Mexico | |
| 86 | Draw | 43–38–4 (1) | Carlos Cebada Chávez | MD | 8 | 8 Oct 2022 | Culiacán, Sinaloa, Mexico | |
| 85 | Loss | 43–38–3 (1) | Rudy Nicolás Macedo | RTD | 2 (8), 3:00 | 25 Mar 2022 | Big Punch Arena, Tijuana, Mexico | |
| 84 | Loss | 43–37–3 (1) | Carlos Carlson | KO | 4 (8), 2:58 | 18 Feb 2022 | Big Punch Arena, Tijuana, Mexico | |
| 83 | Win | 43–36–3 (1) | Rodolfo López Álvarez | UD | 8 | 10 Dec 2021 | Geishas Man Club, Culiacán, Mexico | |
| 82 | Loss | 42–36–3 (1) | José Iván Guardado Ortiz | UD | 6 | 21 Nov 2021 | Big Punch Arena, Tijuana, Mexico | |
| 81 | Loss | 42–35–3 (1) | Sanjarbek Rakhmanov | RTD | 1 (6), 3:00 | 28 Aug 2021 | Big Punch Arena, Tijuana, Mexico | |
| 80 | Loss | 42–34–3 (1) | Carlos Cebada Chávez | SD | 6 | 25 Jun 2021 | Palenque de la Feria Ganadera, Culiacán, Mexico | |
| 79 | Loss | 42–33–3 (1) | Nahir Albright | RTD | 8 (10), 3:00 | 28 May 2021 | Palenque de la Feria Ganadera, Culiacán, Mexico | |
| 78 | Loss | 42–32–3 (1) | Omar Tienda Bahena | TKO | 4 (8), 2:03 | 27 Mar 2021 | Big Punch Arena, Tijuana, Mexico | |
| 77 | Loss | 42–31–3 (1) | Roberto Valenzuela Jr. | TKO | 4 (10), 2:10 | 30 Jan 2021 | La Terraza Sport Bar, Agua Prieta, Mexico | |
| 76 | Loss | 42–30–3 (1) | Isaac Lucero | UD | 6 | 26 Sep 2020 | Entram Gym, Tijuana, Mexico | |
| 75 | Loss | 42–29–3 (1) | Sagadat Rakhmanul | TKO | 5 (8), 1:45 | 9 Aug 2019 | Big Punch Arena, Tijuana, Mexico | |
| 74 | Loss | 42–28–3 (1) | Rodolfo Orozco | UD | 8 | 10 Jul 2019 | Salón de Eventos Josea, Guasave, Mexico | |
| 73 | Loss | 42–27–3 (1) | Miguel Madueno | UD | 8 | 28 Dec 2018 | Club Gallístico Corona, Guasave, Mexico | |
| 72 | Loss | 42–26–3 (1) | Ángel Sarinana Rodríguez | UD | 12 | 1 Dec 2018 | Auditorio Municipal Col. Cuauhtemoc, Santa Rosalía, Mexico | For vacant WBU light welterweight title |
| 71 | Loss | 42–25–3 (1) | Miguel Vázquez | UD | 10 | 13 Apr 2018 | Polideportivo Juan S. Millan, Culiacán, Mexico | |
| 70 | Win | 42–24–3 (1) | Dunis Liñán | TKO | 4 (10), 2:07 | 16 Mar 2018 | Polideportivo Juan S. Millan, Culiacán, Mexico | |
| 69 | Win | 41–24–3 (1) | José Rosario Cazares | UD | 10 | 22 Sep 2017 | Polideportivo Juan S. Millan, Culiacán, Mexico | |
| 68 | Loss | 40–24–3 (1) | Batyrzhan Jukembayev | TKO | 7 (10), 1:55 | 6 Apr 2017 | Metropolis, Montreal, Canada | For vacant IBO International light welterweight title |
| 67 | Win | 40–23–3 (1) | Ramiro Alcaraz | TKO | 3 (10), 2:56 | 15 Dec 2016 | Polideportivo Juan S. Millan, Culiacán, Mexico | |
| 66 | Win | 39–23–3 (1) | José Apodaca | UD | 8 | 26 Aug 2016 | Polideportivo Juan S. Millan, Culiacán, Mexico | |
| 65 | Loss | 38–23–3 (1) | Sammy Valentin | KO | 4 (6), 1:34 | 4 Mar 2016 | A La Carte Event Pavilion, Tampa, Florida, U.S. | |
| 64 | Win | 38–22–3 (1) | Daniel Velázquez | KO | 2 (10), 1:50 | 26 Feb 2016 | Opera Night Club, Culiacán, Mexico | |
| 63 | Loss | 37–22–3 (1) | Emmanuel de Jesús | RTD | 4 (6), 3:00 | 9 Oct 2015 | Civic Center, Kissimmee, Florida, U.S. | |
| 62 | Loss | 37–21–3 (1) | Levan Ghvamichava | RTD | 1 (10), 3:00 | 26 Jun 2015 | Little Creek Casino Resort, Shelton, Washington, U.S. | |
| 61 | Win | 37–20–3 (1) | Oscar Meza | TKO | 10 (10) | 24 Apr 2015 | Palenque de la Feria Ganadera, Culiacán, Mexico | |
| 60 | Loss | 36–20–3 (1) | Sergey Lipinets | TKO | 9 (10), 2:59 | 13 Mar 2015 | A La Carte Event Pavilion, Tampa, Florida, U.S. | For vacant WBC Latino light welterweight title |
| 59 | Loss | 36–19–3 (1) | Konstantin Ponomarev | UD | 10 | 20 Sep 2014 | Celebrity Theatre, Phoenix, Arizona, U.S. | |
| 58 | Win | 36–18–3 (1) | Ty Barnett | KO | 9 (10), 2:52 | 31 May 2014 | Civic Center, Washington, D.C., U.S. | A fight ensued inside the ring after the bout when a disgruntled fan of Barnett tackles Rivera out of anger |
| 57 | Loss | 35–18–3 (1) | Chris van Heerden | RTD | 4 (8), 3:00 | 6 Feb 2014 | Florentine Gardens, Los Angeles, California, U.S. | |
| 56 | Loss | 35–17–3 (1) | Vicente Mosquera | RTD | 7 (10), 3:00 | 28 Jun 2013 | Civic Center, Kissimmee, Florida, U.S. | |
| 55 | Loss | 35–16–3 (1) | Lee Purdy | TKO | 9 (12), 0:56 | 9 Mar 2013 | Wembley Arena, London, England | For IBF International welterweight title |
| 54 | Loss | 35–15–3 (1) | Yordenis Ugás | UD | 10 | 7 Dec 2012 | Civic Center, Kissimmee, Florida, U.S. | |
| 53 | Win | 35–14–3 (1) | Fabián Ramírez | UD | 8 | 16 Mar 2012 | Parque Revolución, Culiacán, Mexico | |
| 52 | Win | 34–14–3 (1) | Antonio Pitalúa | UD | 12 | 18 Nov 2011 | José Cuervo Salón, Mexico City, Mexico | Won vacant WBC Latino light welterweight title |
| 51 | Draw | 33–14–3 (1) | Antonio Pitalúa | SD | 12 | 9 Sep 2011 | Vive Cuervo Salón, Mexico City, Mexico | For vacant WBC Latino light welterweight title |
| 50 | Win | 33–14–2 (1) | Nicolás Lucio | KO | 4 (12) | 30 Jul 2010 | Parque Revolución, Culiacán, Mexico | |
| 49 | Win | 32–14–2 (1) | Ernesto Berrospe | TKO | 4 (10) | 7 May 2010 | Parque Revolicuón, Culiacán, Mexico | |
| 48 | Loss | 31–14–2 (1) | Euri González | MD | 12 | 4 Dec 2009 | Miccosukee Indian Gaming Resort, Miami, Florida, U.S. | For vacant WBO Latino welterweight title |
| 47 | Loss | 31–13–2 (1) | Roman Seliverstov | UD | 12 | 24 Oct 2009 | Urheilutalo, Helsinki, Finland | For vacant IBO Inter-Continental welterweight title |
| 46 | Loss | 31–12–2 (1) | Alfredo Angulo | TKO | 5 (10), 2:38 | 14 Feb 2009 | BankAtlantic Center, Sunrise, Florida, U.S. | |
| 45 | Win | 31–11–2 (1) | Bobby Joe Valdez | TKO | 3 (10), 2:50 | 8 Aug 2008 | Raley Field, Sacramento, California, U.S. | |
| 44 | NC | 30–11–2 (1) | Raúl Pinzón | NC | 8 (12), 2:00 | 8 Feb 2008 | Miccosukee Indian Gaming Resort, Miami, Florida, U.S. | Vacant WBA Fedcentro welterweight title at stake; Originally TKO win for Rivera, subsequently turned to NC by a commission |
| 43 | Loss | 30–11–2 | Andre Berto | UD | 10 | 27 Jul 2007 | City Center, Saratoga Springs, New York, U.S. | |
| 42 | Loss | 30–10–2 | Joel Julio | SD | 12 | 27 Oct 2006 | Miccosukee Indian Gaming Resort, Miami, Florida, U.S. | Lost WBA Fedcentro and WBO Latino welterweight titles |
| 41 | Win | 30–9–2 | Felix Flores | UD | 12 | 2 Jun 2006 | Miccosukee Indian Gaming Resort, Miami, Florida, U.S. | Retained WBA Fedecentro welterweight title; Won WBO Latino welterweight title |
| 40 | Win | 29–9–2 | Gilberto Reyes | KO | 7 (12), 1:57 | 24 Mar 2006 | Miccosukee Indian Gaming Resort, Miami, Florida, U.S. | Won vacant WBA Fedecentro welterweight title |
| 39 | Loss | 28–9–2 | Mario Ramos | UD | 10 | 28 Oct 2005 | Morongo Casino Resort & Spa, Cabazon, California, U.S. | |
| 38 | Loss | 28–8–2 | Zab Judah | TKO | 3 (12), 2:11 | 14 May 2005 | MGM Grand Garden Arena, Paradise, Nevada, U.S. | For WBA (Undisputed), WBC, IBF and The Ring welterweight titles |
| 37 | Win | 28–7–2 | Héctor Javier Valadez | TKO | 4 (10), 3:00 | 3 Dec 2004 | Memorial Civic Auditorium, Stockton, California, U.S. | |
| 36 | Win | 27–7–2 | Hercules Kyvelos | TKO | 4 (12), 1:36 | 4 Sep 2004 | Mandalay Bay, Paradise, Nevada, U.S. | |
| 35 | Win | 26–7–2 | James Hare | TKO | 10 (12), 0:30 | 4 Dec 2003 | Huddersfield Sports Centre, Huddersfield, England | Won WBF welterweight title |
| 34 | Win | 25–7–2 | Pedro Saiz | TKO | 11 (12) | 8 Nov 2002 | Club Amazura, New York City, New York, U.S. | Won vacant USBO light welterweight title |
| 33 | Win | 24–7–2 | Golden Johnson | UD | 12 | 27 Jul 2002 | Scope Arena, Norfolk, Virginia, U.S. | Won vacant WBC Continental Americas light welterweight title |
| 32 | Win | 23–7–2 | Wilfredo Negrón | UD | 12 | 3 May 2002 | Gold Country Casino, Oroville, California, U.S. | |
| 31 | Win | 22–7–2 | Hicklet Lau | UD | 12 | 25 Jan 2002 | Young Pavilion, Pembroke Pines, Florida, U.S. | Won inaugural IBA Americas welterweight title |
| 30 | Loss | 21–7–2 | Arturo Morua | UD | 12 | 19 Oct 2001 | Guadalajara, Jalisco, Mexico | For inaugural WBA Fedcentro light welterweight title |
| 29 | Draw | 21–6–2 | Rodolfo Gómez | PTS | 12 | 24 Mar 2001 | Nuevo Laredo, Tamaulipas, Mexico | |
| 28 | Win | 21–6–1 | Juan Carlos Rodríguez | TKO | 7 | 1 Sep 2000 | Culiacán, Sinaloa, Mexico | |
| 27 | Loss | 20–6–1 | Diosbelys Hurtado | UD | 12 | 12 May 2000 | Miccosukee Indian Gaming Resort, Miami, Florida, U.S. | For vacant IBA Intercontinental light welterweight title |
| 26 | Win | 20–5–1 | Moses James | SD | 12 | 25 Feb 2000 | Spotlight 29 Casino, Coachella, California, U.S. | Won UBF light welterweight title |
| 25 | Win | 19–5–1 | Gilbert Quirós | KO | 9 (12) | 18 Dec 1999 | Spotlight 29 Casino, Coachella, California, U.S. | Won inaugural UBF International light welterweight title |
| 24 | Loss | 18–5–1 | Ricky Quiles | MD | 12 | 25 Sep 1999 | Caesars Tahoe, Stateline, Nevada, U.S. | Lost WBO-NABO light welterweight title |
| 23 | Win | 18–4–1 | Onésimo Noyola | TKO | 6 (12) | 16 Jul 1999 | Culiacán, Sinaloa, Mexico | Retained WBO-NABO light welterweight title |
| 22 | Win | 17–4–1 | Héctor Quiróz | UD | 12 | 15 May 1999 | Tropicana Hotel & Casino, Paradise, Nevada, U.S. | Won WBO-NABO light welterweight title |
| 21 | Loss | 16–4–1 | Antonio Pitalúa | UD | 10 | 6 Mar 1999 | Mexico City, Distrito Federal, Mexico | |
| 20 | Win | 16–3–1 | Óscar Delgado | KO | 1 | 17 Oct 1998 | Mexico City, Distrito Federal, Mexico | |
| 19 | Win | 15–3–1 | Hiram Bueno | TKO | 6 | 7 Aug 1998 | Parque Revolución, Culiacán, Mexico | |
| 18 | Win | 14–3–1 | José Luis Montes | TKO | 6 | 15 May 1998 | Culiacán, Sinaloa, Mexico | |
| 17 | Win | 13–3–1 | Juan Soberanes | TKO | 8 | 20 Mar 1998 | Mexico | |
| 16 | Loss | 12–3–1 | Óscar Delgado | PTS | 10 | 12 Sep 1997 | Arena Coliseo, Guadalajara, Mexico | |
| 15 | Win | 12–2–1 | Eduardo Gómez | TKO | 6 | 26 Jul 1997 | Mexico City, Distrito Federal, Mexico | |
| 14 | Win | 11–2–1 | Efraín Ventura | UD | 10 | 16 Jun 1997 | Tijuana, Baja California, Mexico | |
| 13 | Win | 10–2–1 | Andrés Sandoval | TKO | 3 (10) | 21 Mar 1997 | Ensenada, Baja California, Mexico | Retained Baja California State light welterweight title |
| 12 | Win | 9–2–1 | Antonio Ortega | TKO | 10 (12) | 20 Dec 1996 | Ensenada, Baja California, Mexico | Retained Baja California State light welterweight title |
| 11 | Win | 8–2–1 | Luis Alejandro Ugalde | PTS | 12 | 22 Nov 1996 | Tijuana, Baja California, Mexico | Won inaugural Baja California State light welterweight title |
| 10 | Loss | 7–2–1 | Rogelio Montenegro | PTS | 10 | 5 Aug 1996 | Tijuana, Baja California, Mexico | |
| 9 | Win | 7–1–1 | Julián Gastélum | TKO | 1 | 6 Jul 1996 | Tijuana, Baja California, Mexico | |
| 8 | Win | 6–1–1 | Víctor Flores | TKO | 1 | 20 May 1996 | Tijuana, Baja California, Mexico | |
| 7 | Win | 5–1–1 | Víctor Lozoya | TKO | 7 | 21 Mar 1996 | Tijuana, Baja California, Mexico | |
| 6 | Win | 4–1–1 | Fausto Valenzuela | TKO | 1 | 18 Mar 1996 | Tijuana, Baja California, Mexico | |
| 5 | Win | 3–1–1 | Miguel Meléndez | TKO | 2 | 20 Feb 1996 | Tijuana, Baja California, Mexico | |
| 4 | Win | 2–1–1 | Juan Santos | TKO | 1 | 22 Jan 1996 | Tijuana, Baja California, Mexico | |
| 3 | Win | 1–1–1 | Oliverio Ramirez | PTS | 4 | 4 Dec 1995 | Tijuana, Baja California, Mexico | |
| 2 | Loss | 0–1–1 | Luis Alejandro Ugalde | PTS | 4 | 9 Oct 1995 | Auditorio Municipal, Tijuana, Mexico | |
| 1 | Draw | 0–0–1 | Cachorron Díaz | PTS | 4 | 1 Jan 1993 | Mexico | |
