= Michael Ayers =

Michael Ayers may refer to:

- Mike Ayers (born 1948), American football coach
- Mike Ayers (ice hockey) (born 1980), American ice hockey coach and player
- Michael R. Ayers (born 1935), British philosopher
- Michael Ayers (boxer) (born 1965), British boxer
