= Manuel Garnica =

Manuel Garnica may refer to:

- Manuel Garnica (boxer) (born 1974), Mexican boxer
- Manuel Garnica (runner) (born 1978), Spanish long-distance runner
