= Keith Tate =

English boxer (1945–2019)

Personal information
- Nationality: English
- Born: Keith M. Tate; 30 January 1945 Wakefield, England
- Died: 5 April 2019 (aged 74) Wakefield, England
- Weight: bantamweight

Boxing career

Boxing record
- Total fights: 16
- Wins: 11
- Win by KO: 5
- Losses: 3
- Draws: 2
- No contests: 0

Keith Tate (30 January 1945 – 5 April 2019) was an English amateur, and professional bantamweight boxer of the 1960s, and boxing trainer.

== Background ==
Keith Tate was born in Wakefield, West Riding of Yorkshire (his birth was registered in Lower Agbrigg).

== Boxing career ==
=== Amateur ===
Keith Tate trained at the Robin Hood & Thorpe Amateur Boxing Club (ABC), and National Association of Boys' Clubs. He won the National Coal Board British Flyweight title, was runner-up for the Amateur Boxing Association of England (ABAE) Junior Class-A title against George O'Neill (Wolverhampton ABC) at The Royal Albert Hall, London on Thursday 23 March 1961, won the Amateur Boxing Association of England (ABAE) Junior Class-B title against Ken Buchanan (Sparta AAC) at The Royal Albert Hall, London on Thursday 22 March 1962 and was runner-up for the Amateur Boxing Association of England (ABAE) Flyweight (51 kg) title against Monty Laud (St Ives ABC) at The Empire Pool, London on Friday 26 April 1963. He fought internationally for the Amateur Boxing Association of England; including against Hungary with a points defeat by Hungarian amateur flyweight (51 kg (112.4 lb; 8 st 0.4 lb)) champion Imre Harangozo (born circa-1943, of Székesfehérvár MAV), at King's Hall, Belle Vue, Manchester on Monday 11 November 1963.

=== Professional ===
Keith Tate's first professional boxing bout was a victory over Tommy Connor on Monday 5 October 1964. This was followed by fights including; victory over Tommy Burgoyne (Scottish Area bantamweight champion), two draws, and a defeat by Monty Laud (Southern (England) Area bantamweight champion), defeat by Brian Bissmire (Southern Area bantamweight challenger), two victories over Danny Wells (Southern (England) Area bantamweight challenger), victory over Bobby Davies (Southern (England) Area featherweight challenger). Tate's final professional bout was a defeat by Johnny Mantle (Southern (England) Area featherweight challenger) on Tuesday 20 September 1966.

== Training career ==
Keith Tate established the Cleckheaton Boxing Academy in 1975, and has produced 30 national champions as professional boxers, including the British Super featherweight champion boxer Gary 'Five Star' Sykes, and 3 world champions; James 'Roberttown Rocket' Hare, Mark 'Hobbo' Hobson, and 'Super' Steven Conway.
