= Carlos Maussa =

Colombian boxer (born 1971)

Personal information
- Nickname: El Apóstol ("The Apostle")
- Nationality: Colombian
- Born: Charles Celindo Maussa Diaz; September 24, 1971 (age 54) Montería, Colombia
- Height: 5 ft 10 1/2 in (179 cm)
- Weight: Light welterweight

Boxing career
- Reach: 73 in (185 cm)
- Stance: Orthodox

Boxing record
- Total fights: 25
- Wins: 20
- Win by KO: 18
- Losses: 5

Charles Celindo Maussa Diaz (born September 24, 1971), best known as Carlos Maussa, is a Colombian former professional boxer who competed from 2000 to 2007, and held the WBA light welterweight title in 2005.

== Professional career ==
Turning pro in 2000, at the age of 29, Maussa won two titles and fought in several significant fights until his retirement at age 38.

Maussa was raised in the Santa Fe neighborhood of Montería, a city located in the banks of the Sinú River, where he began his impressive amateur career, which ultimately brought him just nine defeats in 130 bouts. Maussa was named National Champion four times and was also crowned the Central American champion. He gained the nickname “The Apostle” by his frequent preaching of the Christian gospel.

Throughout his professional career, he was regarded as a prominent "gatekeeper," a status in which he served as a critical test for several rising light welterweight prospects and significantly influenced the trajectory of their careers.

== Notable fights ==
Maussa began his career with twelve victories in his native Colombia before coming to the United States. He then won four bouts in the U.S. before facing highly touted New York prospect Jeffrey Resto, described as "perhaps the most-talked-about young pro in New York". In this battle of two undefeated fighters (17-0 Resto vs. 16-0 Maussa), Resto was unable to deal with Maussa's unorthodox fighting style and abruptly quit in the 6th round, earning Maussa an unexpected victory. Both fighters' careers ended half a decade later with a loss to the same fighter, Victor Ortiz.

Maussa's win over Resto earned him a shot at fellow 17-0 boxer and WBC International light welterweight titleholder Miguel Angel Cotto. Maussa's fight against Cotto was less successful, resulting in Cotto winning by an 8th round TKO. Following this, Maussa fought in three lower-profile fights, winning two. Then, on 25 June 2005, he entered the popular consciousness of boxing fans with an upset win by KO against WBA light-welterweight titlist Vivian Harris. This exciting victory made Maussa a new champion in one of boxing’s competitive divisions.

The bout was notable for a number of reasons: Harris was an overwhelming favorite and is regarded as one of the best boxers at the weight and Maussa’s awkwardly clever style and frequent clowning gestures and facial expressions lent him an air of amateurishness. At the beginning of the seventh round Maussa delivered a stunning left hook, KO-ing Harris. Maussa then lunged downward and punched him in the head while he was already supine on the canvas. The ropes absorbed the impact of the blow. Still, this act has led to much controversy, as the hit could have disqualified Maussa. After the match, however, the bout referees ruled that the late hit was “insignificant”, allowing Maussa to keep his title. When interviewed about this punch, Maussa claimed he didn't connect with Harris on purpose, and that his sole intention was to impress the fallen Harris in case he had any desire to fight on.

The victory cemented Maussa's reputation as somewhat of a gatekeeper for up-and-coming light welterweight prospects, but ended up being his last victory. On 26 November 2005 Maussa lost his WBA title against IBF title-holder, Ricky Hatton, in a unification bout. After a unanimous decision loss to Manuel Guarnica, Maussa fought well-regarded future titleholder Victor Ortiz, and was knocked out in the first round. Following this, Maussa retired with a professional record of 20 wins and 5 losses in a total of 113 professional rounds of boxing.

== Professional boxing record ==
25 fights	20 wins	5 losses
By knockout	18	3
By decision	2	2

Key to abbreviations used for results
DQ	Disqualification	RTD	Corner retirement
KO	Knockout	SD	Split decision / split draw
MD	Majority decision / majority draw	TD	Technical decision / technical draw
NC	No contest	TKO	Technical knockout
PTS	Points decision	UD	Unanimous decision / unanimous draw

Boxing record
No.	Result	Record	Opponent	Type	Round(s), time	Date	Location	Notes
25	Loss	20–5	Victor Ortiz	KO	1 (10), 1:47	Nov 10, 2007	Madison Square Garden, New York City, New York, U.S.	
24	Loss	20–4	Manuel Garnica	UD	12	Aug 25, 2006	Miccosukee Resort & Gaming, Miami, Florida, U.S.	For vacant WBA Fedecaribe and WBC Latino light welterweight titles
23	Loss	20–3	Ricky Hatton	KO	9 (12), 1:10	Nov 26, 2005	Hallam FM Arena, Sheffield, England	Lost WBA light welterweight title; For IBF and The Ring light-welterweight titles
22	Win	20–2	Vivian Harris	KO	7 (12), 0:43	Jun 25, 2005	Boardwalk Hall, Atlantic City, New Jersey, U.S.	Won WBA light welterweight title
21	Win	19–2	Antonio Espitia	KO	4 (10)	Mar 19, 2005	Arboletes, Colombia	
20	Loss	18–2	Arturo Morua	UD	12	Dec 17, 2004	Miccosukee Resort & Gaming, Miami, Florida, U.S.	For vacant WBO Latino light welterweight title
19	Win	18–1	Masakazu Satake	SD	10	Mar 6, 2004	Super Arena, Saitama, Japan	
18	Loss	17–1	Miguel Cotto	TKO	8 (12), 2:07	Dec 6, 2003	Coliseo Rubén Rodríguez, Bayamón, Puerto Rico	For WBC International light welterweight title
17	Win	17–0	Jeffrey Resto	TKO	6 (12), 2:00	Sep 26, 2003	Memorial Coliseum, Corpus Christi, Texas, U.S.	Retained WBC Latino light welterweight title
16	Win	16–0	Freddy Cruz	TKO	2 (6)	Aug 1, 2003	Miccosukee Resort & Gaming, Miami, Florida, U.S.	
15	Win	15–0	Hicklet Lau	UD	12	May 29, 2003	American Airlines Arena, Miami, Florida, U.S.	Won vacant WBC Latino light welterweight title
14	Win	14–0	Henry Matos	TKO	3 (6)	Mar 28, 2003	Palladium Athletic Village, Davie, Florida, U.S.	
13	Win	13–0	Jorge Garrido	KO	1 (4)	Dec 20, 2002	Cartagena, Colombia	
12	Win	12–0	Luis Espitia	KO	1	Nov 4, 2002	Montería, Colombia	
11	Win	11–0	Jose Macia	KO	2	Jul 14, 2002	Planeta Rica, Colombia	
10	Win	10–0	Ivan Salgado	KO	3	Apr 30, 2002	Montería, Colombia	
9	Win	9–0	Oscar Carrillo Villa	KO	3 (10)	Jan 19, 2002	Cartagena, Colombia	
8	Win	8–0	Gerardo Barrios	KO	2	Aug 31, 2001	Montería, Colombia	
7	Win	7–0	Eliseo Ferias	KO	2	Jul 27, 2001	Cartagena, Colombia	
6	Win	6–0	Manuel Machado	KO	1	May 2, 2001	Santa Cruz de Lorica, Colombia	
5	Win	5–0	Rafael Correa	KO	1	Mar 30, 2001	Montería, Colombia	
4	Win	4–0	Feder Guerrero	KO	2 (4)	Jan 30, 2001	Barranquilla, Colombia	
3	Win	3–0	Luis Julio	KO	2	Dec 17, 2000	Bogotá, Colombia	
2	Win	2–0	Luis Duarte	KO	2	Sep 18, 2000	Montería, Colombia	
1	Win	1–0	Juan Villadiego	KO	4 (4)	Jul 31, 2000	Bogotá, Colombia	

Sporting positions
Regional boxing titles
New title	WBC Latino super lightweight champion May 29, 2003 – December 6, 2003; Lost bid for International title	Vacant Title next held by Juan Urango
World boxing titles
Preceded by Vivian Harris	WBA super lightweight champion June 25, 2005 – November 26, 2005; Lost bid for Super title	Succeeded by Ricky Hatton as Super champion
