= Ener Julio =

Colombian boxer (born 1973)

Personal information
- Born: 14 October 1973 (age 52) Cartagena, Colombia
- Height: 5 ft 10 in (178 cm)
- Weight: Light welterweight; Welterweight

Boxing career
- Reach: 76 in (193 cm)
- Stance: Orthodox

Boxing record
- Total fights: 37
- Wins: 26
- Win by KO: 19
- Losses: 8
- Draws: 3
Medal record
Men's Amateur boxing
Representing Colombia
Central American and Caribbean Games
Silver medal – second place	1993 Ponce	Welterweight

Ener Julio (born 14 October 1973) is a Colombian former professional boxer who competed from 1994 to 2008. He held the WBO junior welterweight title from 2000 to 2002.

== Professional career ==
Julio made his professional debut in 1994. He captured the WBO light welterweight title with a decision victory over Randall Bailey in Miami. Ener Julio was forced to withdraw out of a title defense against Felix Flores when cataracts were revealed during an eye exam, Julio was forced to vacate his title. Julio would get another shot at the title against DeMarcus Corley but would lose via unanimous decision.

== Professional boxing record ==
37 fights	26 wins	8 losses
By knockout	19	1
By decision	7	7
Draws	3	

No.	Result	Record	Opponent	Type	Round, time	Date	Location	Notes
37	Win	26–8–3	Jhon Jairo Licona	KO	3 (8)	2008-07-05	Coliseo Municipal de Pivijay, Magdalena, Colombia	
36	Loss	25–8–3	Lenin Arroyo	UD	10 (10)	2005-06-17	Miccosukee Resort & Gaming, Miami, Florida, U.S.	
35	Draw	25–7–3	Juan Arroyo	MD	8 (8)	2005-02-11	Miccosukee Resort & Gaming, Miami, Florida, U.S.	
34	Draw	25–7–2	Henry Bruseles	TD	3 (10)	2004-10-29	Coliseo Pedrin Zorrilla, San Juan, Puerto Rico	
33	Loss	25–7–1	David Díaz	TKO	10 (10)	2004-05-15	DePaul Athletic Center, Chicago, Illinois, U.S.	
32	Loss	25–6–1	Jawaid Khaliq	UD	12 (12)	2004-02-14	Harvey Hadden Leisure Centre, Nottingham, England, U.K.	For IBO welterweight title
31	Loss	25–5–1	Hercules Kyvelos	UD	10 (10)	2003-06-06	Miccosukee Resort & Gaming, Miami, Florida, U.S.	
30	Win	25–4–1	Gilberto Mena	TKO	7 (10)	2002-11-30	Coliseo Cubierto, Puerto Colombia, Colombia	
29	Draw	24–4–1	Saul Duran	MD	12 (12)	2002-08-09	Civic Center, Kissimmee, Florida, U.S.	For vacant WBC Latino light-welterweight title
28	Win	24–4	Luis Cardozo	UD	10 (10)	2002-03-22	Coliseo Elias Chegwin, Barranquilla, Colombia	
27	Loss	23–4	DeMarcus Corley	UD	12 (12)	2002-01-19	Jai-Alai Fronton, Miami, Florida, U.S.	For WBO light-welterweight title
26	Win	23–3	Randall Bailey	SD	12 (12)	2000-07-22	American Airlines Arena, Miami, Florida, U.S.	Won WBO light-welterweight title
25	Win	22–3	Jose Zuniga Leal	PTS	12 (12)	2000-05-05	Barranquilla, Colombia	
24	Loss	21–3	DeMarcus Corley	SD	12 (12)	1999-09-24	MCI Center, Washington, D.C., U.S.	For vacant USBA light-welterweight title
23	Win	21–2	Robinson Torres	TKO	2 (8)	1999-07-10	Soledad, Colombia	
22	Win	20–2	Luis Flores	KO	8 (12)	1999-01-08	Cartagena, Colombia	Retained IBO light-welterweight title
21	Win	19–2	David Ojeda	KO	10 (12)	1998-09-12	Barranquilla, Colombia	Won vacant IBO light-welterweight title
20	Win	18–2	Wilfrido Rocha	PTS	8 (8)	1998-03-14	Barranquilla, Colombia	
19	Win	17–2	Gilberto Mena	TKO	7 (?)	1997-12-19	Coliseo Elias Chegwin, Barranquilla, Colombia	
18	Win	16–2	Juan Luis Sanchez	KO	2 (10)	1997-11-07	Discoteca Barrio Abajo, Barranquilla, Colombia	
17	Win	15–2	Pedro Julio	KO	3 (?)	1997-10-09	Barranquilla, Colombia	
16	Win	14–2	Edilberto Villarreal	KO	1 (?)	1997-08-23	Polideportivo Municipal, Riohacha, Colombia	
15	Win	13–2	Newton Villarreal	PTS	8 (8)	1997-03-21	Barranquilla, Colombia	
14	Loss	12–2	John Flores	PTS	8 (8)	1996-11-14	Barranquilla, Colombia	
13	Win	12–1	Regino Casseres	TKO	8 (?)	1996-08-30	Cartagena, Colombia	
12	Win	11–1	Ney Tuiran	PTS	8 (8)	1996-05-31	Cartagena, Colombia	
11	Loss	10–1	Héctor López	UD	10 (10)	1996-01-20	Parramatta Stadium, Parramatta, Australia	
10	Win	10–0	Pablo Hidalgo	KO	2 (?)	1995-09-22	Santa Marta, Colombia	
9	Win	9–0	Gerardo Barrios	TKO	2 (?)	1995-08-04	Barranquilla, Colombia	
8	Win	8–0	Samir Paez	KO	3 (?)	1995-06-24	Coliseo Bernardo Caraballo, Cartagena, Colombia	
7	Win	7–0	Jose Cantillo	PTS	6 (6)	1995-04-21	Sincelejo, Colombia	
6	Win	6–0	Luis Blandon	KO	1 (?)	1995-04-06	Hotel Royal, Barranquilla, Colombia	
5	Win	5–0	Victor Sampayo	KO	2 (?)	1995-03-17	Montería, Colombia	
4	Win	4–0	Wilmer Paternina	KO	1 (?)	1994-12-12	Barranquilla, Colombia	
3	Win	3–0	Orlando Solano	KO	1 (?)	1994-09-30	Barranquilla, Colombia	
2	Win	2–0	Vicente Camargo	TKO	1 (?)	1994-08-05	Barranquilla, Colombia	
1	Win	1–0	Arnovis Diaz	KO	2 (4)	1994-06-10	Cartagena, Colombia	

== See also ==
- List of world light-welterweight boxing champions

Sporting positions
Minor world boxing titles
Vacant Title last held by Israel Cardona	IBO light-welterweight champion September 12, 1998 – 1999; Vacated	Vacant Title next held by Newton Villarreal
Major world boxing titles
Preceded by Randall Bailey	WBO light-welterweight champion July 22, 2000 – June 25, 2001; Stripped	Vacant Title next held by DeMarcus Corley
