= Vivian Harris =

Guyanese boxer (born 1978)

Personal information
- Nickname: Vicious
- Born: Ivan Vivian Harris; June 17, 1978 (age 48) Georgetown, Guyana
- Weight: Light welterweight; Welterweight; Light middleweight

Boxing career
- Stance: Orthodox

Boxing record
- Total fights: 48
- Wins: 33
- Win by KO: 19
- Losses: 12
- Draws: 2
- No contests: 1

Ivan Vivian Harris (born June 17, 1978) is a Guyanese former professional boxer who competed from 1997 to 2018. He held the WBA super lightweight title from 2002 to 2005.

== Amateur career ==
After Harris arrived in the U.S., he began his amateur boxing career, racking up 45 wins, 5 losses, and 32 KO's. In 1995, Harris won the Metros championship, and the New York Golden Gloves two years later. Following these successes, Harris turned professional in 1997.

== Professional career ==
Harris made his professional debut on November 4, 1997, when he fought Levi Long and KO'd him in the first minute of the first round. In December of the same year, Harris defeated Adam Salas, forcing the referee to stop the bout prematurely.

This pattern of aggressive fighting continued for years. Harris won against several competitors, until he faced Ray Oliveira in early 2000. Harris was not able to match Oliveira's overall punch output, and consequently lost a 10-round decision. Later that year, Harris was matched against Ivan Robinson, a fight that many thought he convincingly won. However, due to New Jersey's consensus scoring system, Harris was forced to accept a draw.

=== WBA light welterweight champion ===
On October 19, 2002, Harris defeated Diobelys Hurtado and captured the WBA junior welterweight title. Harris defended his title twice in the next two years against Souleyman Mbaye and Oktay Urkal, respectively.

In June 2005 Harris was set to fight Colombian boxer Carlos Maussa as a part of the Thunder and Lighting Floyd Mayweather Jr. v. Arturo Gatti pay-per-view. Harris started the fight aggressively, and hurt Maussa in the first round. He continued to apply pressure, gunning for a knockout. However Maussa survived, and started to get stronger as the fight went on.

At this point, Harris grew visibly tired as he desperately tried to score a knockout. However, in the seventh round, Maussa caught Harris with a left hook that sent Harris to the canvas. As the referee began counting, Maussa delivered another punch to Harris as he was down, although Harris was already hurt by the first blow, and the subsequent late punch did not land cleanly. Harris failed to answer the 10-count and the bout was scored as a knockout for Maussa.

Vivian Harris and Junior Witter met on September 6, 2007, in Doncaster, England, fighting for the WBC light welterweight belt. Witter came out more aggressive than usual, winning the first six rounds until knocking Harris out in the seventh with a punishing left hook that caught Harris off-guard. Harris once again fell short of winning a championship, not able to answer the count of 10 in his second straight title fight.

Vivian Harris and Mexican Noe Bolanos met on August 14, 2009, in Tucson, Arizona, in the main event of ESPN's Friday Night Fights. In Round 2, Harris and Bolanos collided heads. Harris stumbled towards his corner and collapsed while the ringside doctor was talking with him. Harris appeared to be conscious but not entirely alert. He left the ring on a stretcher, was allowed to briefly walk around the fighter area, and was taken to a local hospital as a precaution. The referee stopped the fight officially at 40 seconds of Round 2, declaring the match a No Contest. Six months later he fought against Lucas Martin Matthysse, losing by a controversial fourth-round TKO. In his next fight on the undercard of Mora vs. Mosley against futurewelterweight champion Victor Ortiz, Harris was dropped three times in round two, and was dropped a fourth time in the third round for a KO loss to Ortiz.

Returning in 2011 against welterweight Jesse Vargas, Harris was severely battered in the first round, appearing unprepared for the bout, defenseless, and without skills or stamina, and gave up at the end of the round, virtually ending his career with his third consecutive KO loss. It turns out Vivian had only two weeks notice for this fight and had to drop several pounds in a short time, including two pounds on the day of the fight itself. This drained him and caused his performance to suffer.

Vivian fought again in July 2011 against Lanardo Tyner, losing a controversial unanimous decision to him. Harris and several ringside reporters felt he won the fight.

== Outside of boxing ==
In 2009, Harris became the subject of an upcoming television reality series produced by John Edmonds Kozma (producer of Nick Cassavetes's Kentucky Rhapsody") and shot by filmmaker Richard O'Sullivan. The unnamed reality series never aired.

== Professional boxing record ==
48 fights	33 wins	12 losses
By knockout	19	9
By decision	14	3
Draws	2	
No contests	1	

No.	Result	Record	Opponent	Type	Round, time	Date	Location	Notes
48	Win	33–12–2 (1)	DeMarcus Corley	UD	12	Jul 21, 2018	FedExForum, Memphis, Tennessee, U.S.	Won vacant ABF Continental Americas light welterweight title
47	Loss	32–12–2 (1)	DeMarcus Corley	UD	10	May 20, 2017	Convention Center, Raleigh, North Carolina, U.S.	For vacant UBF All America welterweight title
46	Loss	32–11–2 (1)	Prichard Colón	KO	4 (6), 1:03	Sep 11, 2015	Ricoh Coliseum, Toronto, Ontario, Canada	
45	Loss	32–10–2 (1)	Ramón Álvarez	KO	7 (12), 0:44	Nov 29, 2014	Modulo Comude, San Miguel de Allende, Mexico	For vacant IBF North American junior middleweight title
44	Win	32–9–2 (1)	Jorge Páez Jr.	SD	10	Mar 22, 2014	Arena Monterrey, Monterrey, Mexico	
43	Win	31–9–2 (1)	Danny O'Connor	SD	10	Oct 12, 2013	Electric Factory, Philadelphia, Pennsylvania, U.S.	
42	Win	30–9–2 (1)	Shakha Moore	UD	8	Mar 16, 2013	Tsongas Center, Lowell, Massachusetts, U.S.	
41	Loss	29–9–2 (1)	Brian Rose	KO	3 (10), 1:48	Oct 5, 2012	Winter Gardens, Blackpool, England	
40	Loss	29–8–2 (1)	Ed Paredes	TKO	10 (10), 2:21	Jul 21, 2012	Hard Rock Live, Hollywood, Florida, U.S.	For vacant WBA–NABA interim welterweight title
39	Draw	29–7–2 (1)	David Barnes	TD	5 (8)	Mar 11, 2012	De Vere Whites Hotel, Bolton, England	Points TD: Barnes cut from an accidental head clash
38	Loss	29–7–1 (1)	Lanardo Tyner	UD	10	Jul 15, 2011	Club Chicago, Burbank, Illinois, U.S.	For vacant USBO welterweight title
37	Loss	29–6–1 (1)	Jessie Vargas	RTD	1 (10), 3:00	Apr 8, 2011	Star of the Desert Arena, Primm, Nevada, U.S.	
36	Loss	29–5–1 (1)	Victor Ortiz	KO	3 (10), 0:45	Sep 18, 2010	Staples Center, Los Angeles, California, U.S.	
35	Loss	29–4–1 (1)	Lucas Matthysse	TKO	4 (10), 2:44	Feb 20, 2010	El Plaza Condesa, Mexico City, Mexico	
34	NC	29–3–1 (1)	Noe Bolanos	NC	2 (10), 0:40	Aug 14, 2009	Desert Diamond Casino, Tucson, Arizona, U.S.	Harris unable to continue after an accidental head clash
33	Win	29–3–1	Octavio Narvaez	TKO	6 (10), 0:48	Oct 29, 2008	Medieval Times, Lyndhurst, New Jersey, U.S.	
32	Loss	28–3–1	Junior Witter	KO	7 (12), 1:00	Sep 7, 2007	The Dome Leisure Centre, Doncaster, England	For WBC light welterweight title
31	Win	28–2–1	Juan Lazcano	UD	12	Feb 10, 2007	Mandalay Bay Events Center, Paradise, Nevada, U.S.	
30	Win	27–2–1	Stevie Johnston	TKO	7 (10), 2:15	Jul 29, 2006	Chumash Casino Resort, Santa Ynez, California, U.S.	
29	Win	26–2–1	Marteze Logan	UD	10	Jan 20, 2006	Pechanga Resort & Casino, Temecula, California, U.S.	
28	Loss	25–2–1	Carlos Maussa	KO	7 (12), 0:43	Jun 25, 2005	Boardwalk Hall, Atlantic City, New Jersey, U.S.	Lost WBA light welterweight title
27	Win	25–1–1	Oktay Urkal	TKO	11 (12), 0:56	Oct 23, 2004	Tempodrom, Berlin, Germany	Retained WBA light welterweight title
26	Win	24–1–1	Oktay Urkal	MD	12	Apr 17, 2004	Max-Schmeling-Halle, Berlin, Germany	Retained WBA (Regular) light welterweight title
25	Win	23–1–1	Souleymane M'baye	UD	12	Jul 12, 2003	The Orleans, Paradise, Nevada, U.S.	Retained WBA (Regular) light welterweight title
24	Win	22–1–1	Diosbelys Hurtado	TKO	2 (12), 0:43	Oct 19, 2002	Reliant Park and Astrodomain, Houston, Texas, U.S.	Won WBA (Regular) and IBA light welterweight titles
23	Win	21–1–1	Ubaldo Hernandez	UD	12	Jul 16, 2002	Memorial Civic Center, Canton, Ohio, U.S.	Retained IBA Continental light welterweight title
22	Win	20–1–1	Michael Clark	UD	12	Feb 22, 2002	Value City Arena, Columbus, Ohio, U.S.	Won vacant IBA Continental light welterweight title
21	Win	19–1–1	Jose Luis Juarez	SD	10	Sep 22, 2001	Mandalay Bay Events Center, Paradise, Nevada, U.S.	
20	Win	18–1–1	Golden Johnson	KO	3 (10), 2:04	Jun 15, 2001	The Blue Horizon, Philadelphia, Pennsylvania, U.S.	
19	Win	17–1–1	Hector Arroyo	TKO	1 (6), 2:06	May 19, 2001	Mohegan Sun Arena, Montville, Connecticut, U.S.	
18	Draw	16–1–1	Ivan Robinson	PTS	10	Aug 11, 2000	Tropicana Casino & Resort, Atlantic City, New Jersey, U.S.	UD scorecards for Harris, ruled a draw by the NJSACB due to consensus rules scoring
17	Loss	16–1	Ray Oliveira	UD	10	Feb 25, 2000	Rhodes-on-the Pawtuxet, Cranston, Rhode Island, U.S.	
16	Win	16–0	Gairy St. Clair	UD	10	Dec 10, 1999	The Blue Horizon, Philadelphia, Pennsylvania, U.S.	
15	Win	15–0	Isander Lacen	TKO	6, 3:00	Aug 27, 1999	William B. Bell Auditorium, Augusta, Georgia, U.S.	
14	Win	14–0	Damian Brazoban	UD	8	Jun 19, 1999	Madison Square Garden, New York City, New York, U.S.	
13	Win	13–0	Hector Arroyo	RTD	2 (6), 3:00	Apr 16, 1999	Grand Casino, Tunica, Mississippi, U.S.	
12	Win	12–0	Jerry Smith	KO	1 (4), 2:17	Feb 20, 1999	Madison Square Garden, New York City, New York, U.S.	
11	Win	11–0	Shawn Brown	TKO	6 (8), 1:32	Dec 12, 1998	Etess Arena, Atlantic City, New Jersey, U.S.	
10	Win	10–0	Eldon Sneed	TKO	1 (8), 1:38	Nov 13, 1998	Mahi Shriner Auditorium, Miami, Florida, U.S.	
9	Win	9–0	Theon Holland	TKO	3	Oct 15, 1998	Hilton, Washington, D.C., U.S.	
8	Win	8–0	Michael Moss	TKO	1 (4), 2:51	Aug 18, 1998	Grand Casino, Tunica, Mississippi, U.S.	
7	Win	7–0	Hector Cabrera	KO	1 (4), 0:56	Jul 21, 1998	Etess Arena, Atlantic City, New Jersey, U.S.	
6	Win	6–0	Michael Lopez	TKO	2 (6), 0:37	Apr 14, 1998	Miccosukee Resort & Gaming, Miami, Florida, U.S.	
5	Win	5–0	Carlos Horacio Nevarez	KO	1 (4), 2:59	Apr 14, 1998	Foxwoods Resort Casino, Ledyard, Connecticut, U.S.	
4	Win	4–0	Garland Johnson	UD	4	Mar 10, 1998	National Guard Armory, Pikesville, Maryland, U.S.	
3	Win	3–0	Ahmed Lamb	KO	1	Jan 17, 1998	Boardwalk Hall, Atlantic City, New Jersey, U.S.	
2	Win	2–0	Adam Salas	TKO	4 (4)	Dec 18, 1997	Holiday Inn International Airport, Newark, New Jersey, U.S.	
1	Win	1–0	Leviticus Long	KO	1 (4)	Nov 4, 1997	Grand Casino, Tunica, Mississippi, U.S.	

Sporting positions
Minor world boxing titles
Preceded by Diosbelys Hurtado	IBA light welterweight champion October 19, 2002 – July 12, 2003; Vacated	Vacant Title next held by Alex Trujillo
Major world boxing titles
Preceded by Diosbelys Hurtado	WBA (Regular) light welterweight champion October 19, 2002 – June 16, 2004; Promoted	Vacant Title next held by Marcos Maidana
Vacant Title last held by Kostya Tszyu as Undisputed champion	WBA light welterweight champion June 16, 2004 – June 25, 2005	Succeeded by Carlos Maussa
