= Manny Pacquiao vs. Jessie Vargas =

2016 boxing match

The Legend/The Champ
- Date: November 5, 2016
- Venue: Thomas & Mack Center, Las Vegas, Nevada, U.S.
- Title(s) on the line: WBO and Lineal welterweight titles

Tale of the tape
Boxer	Manny Pacquiao	Jessie Vargas
Nickname	"Pac-Man"	"The New Generation"
Hometown	General Santos, South Cotabato, Philippines	Los Angeles, California, U.S.
Purse	$4,000,000	$2,800,000
Pre-fight record	58–6–2 (38 KO)	27–1 (10 KO)
Age	37 years, 10 months	27 years, 5 months
Height	5 ft 5 1/2 in (166 cm)	5 ft 10 in (178 cm)
Weight	144 3/5 lb (66 kg)	146 1/2 lb (66 kg)
Style	Southpaw	Orthodox
Recognition	Lineal; Welterweight Champion; WBO; No. 1 Ranked Welterweight; 8-division world champion	WBO; Welterweight Champion; The Ring/TBRB; No. 8 Ranked Welterweight

Result
- Pacquiao wins via 12-round unanimous decision (114–113, 118–109, 118–109)

Manny Pacquiao vs. Jessie Vargas, billed as The Legend/The Champ, was a boxing match contested on November 5, 2016, for the WBO and Lineal welterweight championship. The event took place at the Thomas & Mack Center in Las Vegas, Nevada. Pacquiao won the fight by unanimous decision and took the WBO welterweight title.

== Background ==
On August 3, Pacquiao's business manager confirmed that WBO welterweight champion Jessie Vargas (27–1, 10 KO) would be the next opponent for Pacquiao on November 5, at the Thomas & Mack Center in Las Vegas, Nevada. Pacquiao made the confirmation after a two-hour meeting with Top Rank's Bob Arum and Canadian adviser Michael Koncz held in Manila on August 7, that he agreed to fight Vargas. "Yes, the fight is on. I have agreed to a Nov. 5 fight with reigning WBO welterweight champion Jessie Vargas. Boxing is my passion. I miss what I'd been doing inside the gym and atop the ring. My entire training camp will be held here in the Philippines so I can attend to my legislative works. This is my campaign promise and I'm determined to keep it," Pacquiao said in a statement. He also explained that he has to fight again to earn a living: "Boxing is my main source of income. I can't rely on my salary as public official. I'm helping the family of my wife and my own family, as well. Many people also come to me to ask for help and I just couldn't ignore them."

In a press conference on September 8 held in Los Angeles, California, it was announced by Bob Arum that the fight would be self-distributed by Top Rank PPV. He also revealed that his company would continue to produce and distribute future pay-per-view events without the involvement of HBO. As for the commentating panel, Arum stressed that he planned on putting a star-studded announcing team together, which would rival the work of HBO's Jim Lampley and Max Kellerman. Arum confided that he was in talks with major boxing analysts, but he declined to name one as he had not worked out any official deals yet. "I think the commentating team is going to blow everybody's socks off," he vowed. According to Arum, Top Rank's initial plans had received a good feedback from its partners and television companies, which gave him a hindsight that they could pull it off. "They're all very, very receptive to getting this kind of programming. But right now, this looks like the most likely scenario," Arum stated.

=== Fight purses ===
Pacquiao was guaranteed $4 million plus a percentage of the revenue of the fight while Vargas was guaranteed $2.5 million.

Guaranteed base purses

- Manny Pacquiao ($4,000,000) vs. Jessie Vargas ($2,800,000)
- Oscar Valdez ($200,000) vs. Hiroshige Osawa ($50,000)
- Nonito Donaire ($400,000) vs. Jessie Magdaleno ($90,000)
- Zou Shiming ($5,000) vs. Prasitsak Phaprom ($5,000)

== Fight details ==
Floyd Mayweather Jr. made an entrance and sat ringside with his daughter before the main event began. When asked why he was at the fight, he replied, "I'm just taking her to the fight.", whilst pointing to his daughter.

In front of 16,132 in attendance, Pacquiao defeated Vargas in a lopsided unanimous decision to win the WBO welterweight title for the third time. In the second round, Pacquiao caught Vargas with a straight left counter, dropping him to the canvas. In the eighth round, an accidental clash of heads opened a deep cut on Vargas’ right eyebrow. However, replays between rounds clearly showed that the cut above Vargas’ eye in the eighth was caused by a left straight punch, which the Nevada Athletic Commission had ruled. In the eleventh round, Vargas went down on a slip, tripping over his feet after he got hit by a right. Vargas went down again in the twelfth round, but Kenny Bayless ruled it another slip. Pacquiao won on all three ringside scorecards—118–109, 118–109 and 114–113.

According to CompuBox statistics, Pacquiao landed 147 of 409 of his punches (36%) and Vargas landed 104 of 562 of his punches thrown (19%).

== Aftermath ==
The fight sold 300,000 pay-per-view (PPV) buys in the United States (US), earning an estimated $18 million in pay-per-view revenue.

== Fight card ==
Confirmed bouts:

Main card (PPV)
Weight class				Method	Round	Time	Notes
Welterweight	Manny Pacquiao	def.	Jessie Vargas (c)	UD	12/12		(Note: For WBO Welterweight title)
Featherweight	Óscar Valdez (c)	def.	Hiroshige Osawa	TKO	7/12	1:50	(Note: For WBO featherweight title)
Super bantamweight	Jessie Magdaleno	def.	Nonito Donaire (c)	UD	12/12		(Note: For WBO super bantamweight title)
Flyweight	Zou Shiming	def.	Kwanpichit Onesongchaigym	UD	12/12		(Note: For vacant WBO flyweight title)
Preliminary bouts
Super welterweight	Alexander Besputin	def.	Azael Cosio	RTD	6/8	3:00
Super featherweight	Robson Conceição	def.	Clay Burns	UD	6/6
Lightweight	Teófimo López	def.	Ishwar Siqueiros	KO	2/4	2:03
Featherweight	Fernando Fuentes	def.	Que Xu	UD	6/6

== Broadcasting ==
For this event, the organizers Top Rank, broadcast, produced and distributed the event on their own under the "Top Rank PPV" brand instead of it being broadcast by HBO, the broadcaster of most Pacquiao fights in the United States. The reason was because the latter had scheduled an event on November 19 and because Pacquiao insisted that HBO broadcast his bout between November 5 and November 14, due to his busy schedule and participation in the Philippine senate, where he is a senator. Because of this, both domestic and international feeds carried the Top Rank-produced broadcast.

MLB Network's Brian Kenny, ESPN's Stephen A. Smith and boxer Timothy Bradley served as ringside commentators, Crystina Poncher handled interviews and updates in the locker room, while Fox Sports and Extra's Charissa Thompson handled as the hostess of the event.

While the broadcast was a success in the US, some international countries (including the Philippines, Pacquiao's home country) had some "minor" problems when the fight was broadcast. Portions where the ringside commentators or Charissa Thompson would appear on camera would be cut out and replaced with different shots of the arena. Another was the post-fight interview of the main bout, where it was replaced with natural crowd noise, making it hard to hear what Pacquiao, Vargas and Stephen A. Smith were actually saying (the latter had a little audio noise, but the fighters were harder to hear).

Country	Broadcaster
Australia	Main Event
Hungary	Sport 1
Panama	RPC Televisión
United Kingdom	BoxNation
United States	Top Rank PPV

Preceded by vs. Timothy Bradley III	Manny Pacquiao's bouts 5 November 2016	Succeeded by vs. Jeff Horn
Preceded by vs. Sadam Ali	Jessie Vargas's bouts 5 November 2016	Succeeded by vs. Aaron Herrera
