= Jessie Vargas =

American boxer (born 1989)

- Vargas in 2010

Personal information
- Nicknames: La Nueva Generación ("The New Generation")
- Born: May 10, 1989 (age 37) Los Angeles, California, U.S.
- Height: 5 ft 11 in (180 cm)
- Weight: Light welterweight; Welterweight; Light middleweight

Boxing career
- Reach: 71 in (180 cm)
- Stance: Orthodox

Boxing record
- Total fights: 35
- Wins: 29
- Win by KO: 11
- Losses: 4
- Draws: 2

Jessie Vargas (born May 10, 1989) is an American professional boxer. He held the WBO welterweight world title in 2016. He also held the WBA (Regular) and IBO super lightweight world titles in 2014.

== Amateur career ==
Vargas had an amateur record of 120 wins and 20 losses. He was a two-time Mexican national champion, a two-time United States junior national champion, and was a member of the 2008 Mexican Olympic team.

== Professional career ==
=== Early years ===
In September 2008, Vargas won his pro debut against the undefeated Joel Gonzalez by first-round knockout.

Vargas got attention when, during a fight against Trenton Titsworth, Vargas was kissed on the neck and he responded by hitting Titsworth during the break. Titsworth was docked two points, Vargas one.

In his twelfth fight he knocked out a former IBO light welterweight Champion Daniel Sarmiento of Argentina. The bout was the main event of FSN's Fight Night Club. In his next fight Vargas won an eight-round unanimous decision against Mexican Ramón Montaño on the undercard of Amir Khan vs. Marcos Maidana.

On February 24, 2011, Vargas fought at Club Nokia in Los Angeles, California, against journeyman Cristian Favela (19–31–7, 10 KOs). The fight went the 8 round distance. Favela pressed the action more than expected but ultimately lost on the cards with the three scorecards reading 79–73, 78–74 and 77–75 in favour of Vargas. On March 31, Golden Boy announced that Vargas would fight former WBA light welterweight Champion Vivian Harris (29–5–1, 19 KO's) at the Desert Arena in Primm, Nevada, on April 8. This bout was televised on TeleFutura. Vargas picked up the biggest win of his career to date after Harris quit on his stool after just one round. Vargas didn't allow Harris to put any work in and badly shook Harris on a few occasions, in what some believed would be a competitive bout. With the win, Vargas improved to 15–0 (8 KOs).

On June 14, British boxer Ashley Theophane declined the opportunity to fight Vargas on the undercard of Floyd Mayweather Jr vs. Victor Ortiz, which was scheduled to take place on September 17. Theophane stated when he was told he could fight on the card, he expected a potential rematch with Danny Garcia or another big name, however Vargas' name was brought up for an 8-round fight. Colombian boxer Walter Estrada (39–14–1, 25 KO's) was later confirmed to be Vargas' next opponent in a scheduled 10 round bout on July 8. After a slow first round, Vargas landed a clean left uppercut in the second round knocking out Estrada. The stoppage came 38 seconds into the round. Vargas was next scheduled to fight on the Mayweather vs. Ortiz undercard against Josesito Lopez (29–3, 17 KOs). In August 2011, British boxer Amir Khan began chasing a big money fight with Floyd Mayweather Jr. possibly for 2012. Vargas began calling out Khan for a potential fight. Speaking to Fighthype.com, Mayweather said, "Jessie Vargas wants to know why Amir Khan is ducking and dodging. He's asking for him. Everybody is ducking and dodging him. He's my fighter and he wants [Khan]." Speaking on a radio show, Vargas said, "He keeps saying he wants to fight Floyd. If he really wants to fight Floyd then he has to fight me first." Vargas earned a tough victory via split decision. One judge scored the bout 95–94 for Lopez, whilst the other two scored had it 96–93 and 95–94 for Vargas, giving him the win. In the 10 rounds, Vargas landed 167 of 851 punches thrown (20%) and Lopez landed 122 of his 509 thrown (24%). Vargas fought on May 5, 2012, on the Mayweather vs. Cotto undercard defeating Steve Forbes (35–10, 11 KOs) after 10 rounds. The scorecards read 100–90, 97–93 and 98–92. Forbes was a late replacement for Alfonso Gómez, who withdrew with back spasms.

On June 6, 2012, Vargas signed a deal with boxing manager Cameron Dunkin. There was rumors that Vargas would be joining Top Rank. The rumors turned out true. On June 20, Vargas left Mayweather Promotions to sign with Top Rank.

On February 2, 2013, Top Rank announced that Vargas would be opening the Timothy Bradley vs. Ruslan Provodnikov card against Wale 'Lucky Boy' Omotoso (23–0, 19 KOs) on March 16 at the Home Depot Center in Carson, California. The fight was shown live on HBO. Vargas was dropped to one knee in round two, but went on to win a hard-fought battle against Omotoso. One judge scored the fight 97–92 and the remaining two scored it 96–93 in favour of Vargas. ESPN scored the fight 95–94 in favor of Omotoso. HBO's Harold Lederman had it a 94–94 draw. Omotoso started off the fight much stronger than Vargas, but the latter took control midway. In round two, during an exchange, Omotoso landed a body shot forcing Vargas' knee to touch the mat, thus ruling a knockdown. With the win, Vargas claimed the vacant WBC Continental Americas welterweight title. Vargas landed 165 punches of 486 total thrown (34%). Omotoso, outlanded in nine rounds, landed 103 of his 429 thrown (24%).

In May 2013, Vargas stated he was likely to return on the undercard of Juan Manuel Marquez vs. Tim Bradley HBO pay-per-view, scheduled to take place in the fall at the Thomas & Mack Center in Las Vegas. HBO set October 12 as the date of the event. Veteran Ghanaian boxer Ray Narh (26–3, 21KOs) was announced as his opponent. It was also revealed the fight would take place on the HBO PPV, but instead UniMás would televise a card from the same venue on the Friday night. In the final seconds of the fight, Vargas dropped Narh. Although Narh beat the count, he lost on the scorecards, which read 97–92 and 98–91 twice. Both boxers fought on the inside majority of the fight, landing power shots, with many clean shots landed.

=== Light welterweight ===
In October 2013, Vargas considered moving back down to light welterweight, the weight he began his career. For his last six fight, Vargas began fighting at the welterweight limit. Speaking to Boxing Scene, he said, "I know I can still make the weight. I was on weight early for my last fight. I even ate before the weigh in and I didn't have any problems."

==== Vargas vs. Allakhverdiev ====
On January 30, 2014, it was announced that Vargas would get his first opportunity to fight for a world title on the Manny Pacquiao vs. Timothy Bradley II PPV card on HBO on April 12 at the MGM Grand Garden Arena in Nevada. He would challenge fellow Top Rank stablemate, 31 year old Khabib Allakhverdiev (19–0, 9 KO) for the WBA 'Regular' and IBO light welterweight titles. Allakhverdiev won the title in 2012, when it was vacant against Joan Guzmán. Vargas worked with well known trainer Ismael Salas for the first time. On fight night, Vargas claimed his first world title defeating Allakhverdiev via unanimous decision. Vargas used head movement, quick jabs and well-placed uppercuts to help get the win on the scorecards. The three judges' scored the fight 117–111, 115–113 and 115–113 in favour of Vargas. ESPN's Dan Rafael scored the fight 115–113 for Allakhverdiev, as did HBO's unofficial scorer Harold Lederman. In the post-fight, Vargas said, "I thought I should have been busier earlier in the fight and I got stronger and I thought I took control midway through the fight. This was my first 12-round fight. I worked hard for three months in the Top Rank gym. This fight, this win will make me an even better fighter." Allakhverdiev claimed he wanted a rematch straight away. For the fight, Allakhverdiev took home $250,000 whilst Vargas had a $90,000 purse.

==== Vargas vs. Novikov ====
Vargas vacated the IBO title. In May, Boxing Scene stated Vargas would make his first defence against Russian boxer Anton Novikov (29–0, 10 KOs), although a deal was not finalized. The same source stated the bout would feature on the undercard of Brandon Rios vs. Diego Chaves on August 2, 2014, in either Las Vegas or Fresno. On June 6, the fight was confirmed to take place at The Cosmopolitan Hotel and Casino in Las Vegas. Vargas was excited the bout would be taking place in his home town. As Part of the negotiations, Vargas agreed to random drug testing by VADA. At the same time, Novikov hadn't yet agreed to the drug testing, although he was offered a sponsorship to cover the costs. Novikov failed a post fight drug test in 2012 after he won the vacant WBC silver welterweight title against Karlo Tabaghua in Russia. Novikov's promoter Steve Bash did not mention the drug testing until a month later. Novikov said in regards to the drug testing, “I don’t mind any type of testing. The people who are winning fights should win them fairly.” In what was said to be another controversial decision, Vargas retained his WBA title after 12 rounds. The three judges' scorecards read 118–111, 118–111 and 117–111. ESPN and BadLeftHook scored the fight closer in favour of Novikov. Vargas started the fight well pressing the action and making Novikov miss. Novikov began to take control after round five, but tired a few rounds later. In the championship rounds, Novikov landed several hard shots to the body and head of Vargas, however it was Vargas that ended the fight the strongest. CompuBox stats showed that Vargas landed 191 of 783 punches thrown (24%), which including 153 power shots landed. Novikov landed 223 of his 812 shots (27%), which included 151 power shots landed. Vargas said of the win, "I can be even better. It was a rough fight. I landed the cleaner punches." ESPN reported that Vargas earned $125,000 and Novikov earned a $105,000 purse. The fight averaged of 728,000 viewers on HBO, peaking at 839,000 viewers.

==== Vargas vs. DeMarco ====
On September 16, 2014 Top Rank promoter Bob Arum announced that Vargas would be making his second title defence on the undercard of Manny Pacquiao vs. Chris Algieri at The Venetian Macao in Macau, SAR on November 22 against 28 year old Mexican boxer and former lightweight world champion Antonio DeMarco (31–3–1, 23 KOs). On announcement, Vargas said, "My opponent is a tough, rugged fighter who comes to fight. I know this will be a fight that fans throughout the world will enjoy. This is very exciting for our team to be part of an event of this magnitude. I plan on bringing my world title belt back to Las Vegas." Vargas began training with former pound for pound king of the 90's, Roy Jones Jr. There was talks between Vargas and Arum before the fight. Arum stated there would be some big opportunities for Vargas in 2015. The fight went the distance with Vargas earning a unanimous decision win to retain his world title. All three judges' scored the fight 116–112 in favour of Vargas. Vargas, who is usually a defensive style fighter, showed a more offensive approach. This was most likely due to Jones being his new trainer. Both fighters were accurate with their punching, landing at a connect rate of over 40%. DeMarco announced his retirement after the fight.

=== Welterweight ===
==== Vargas vs. Bradley ====
On April 30, 2015, it was announced that Vargas would be making his welterweight debut against former two-weight world champion Timothy Bradley (31–1–1, 12 KOs) on June 27 at StubHub Center in Carson, California. It was later announced the bout would be contested for the WBO interim title. On May 29, Vargas replaced Jones as his trainer with former world champion Erik Morales. A small crowd of 4,311 was announced. Bradley pretty much dominated the exchanges throughout, punishing Vargas repeatedly to the body and head. While absorbing major damage, Vargas had shown the ability to hurt Bradley and with 20 seconds left in round 12 landed a massive punch that buckled Bradley's knees and had him stumbling across the ring. Vargas followed him and landed 2 more head shots before being tied up near the ropes. Referee Pat Russell heard the 10 second warning and mistakenly signaled that the fight was over with 7–8 seconds remaining. Vargas believed he had TKO'd Bradley and celebrated atop the turnbuckle. When order was restored it was ruled that the referee's mistake was impossible to fix and the fight would go to the scorecards. Bradley, at that point, deserved the unanimous decision. The judges scored the fight 115–112, 116–112 and 117–111 all in Bradley's favour. Vargas had called for a rematch.

CompuBox showed that Bradley landed 232 of his 676 punches (34%), and Vargas landed 203 of 630 thrown (32%). Bradley earned $1.5 million compared to Vargas' $600,000 purse. Russell claimed it was an honest mistake. After viewing the end, he said, "[Bradley's] hurt. He's still hurt and still on his feet. He's working a bit, he's in it. Sounded like the bell to me. But you don't always hear the 10-second warning. You'd like to, but what I thought I heard was the bell. I made the call that I made based upon what I heard. That's all I can say. It was an honest call based on an honest reaction." The fight averaged 1.121 million viewers and peaked at 1.228 million on HBO.

On July 8, Vargas filed an appeal to the California State Athletic Commission to change the outcome of the fight to No Contest.

==== Vargas vs. Ali ====
After Bradley decided against the rematch, instead opting to fight Manny Pacquiao for a third time, the WBO Welterweight title became vacant. It was announced that Vargas would still have a chance at the world title against Sadam Ali. In the fight, Vargas landed the more effective blows in what wasn't really a close fight. Vargas knocked down Ali in rounds eight and nine. Vargas landed a brutal body shot followed by a right to the head to knock him out on his feet and win the vacant WBO world title. Vargas was ahead on all judges scorecards at the time of TKO (79–72, 77–74 twice). Vargas credited new trainer Dewey Cooper, his sixth trainer in eight years as a pro, for the game plan and conditioning. Vargas landed 159 punches from his 428 thrown compared to 118 landed from 408 from Ali. The fight averaged 726,000 viewers on HBO, peaking at 848,000 viewers.

==== Negotiations with Kell Brook ====
It was announced on May 12, 2016, that negotiations for a unification fight with IBF titleholder Kell Brook (36–0, 25 KOs) were under way. Hearn told Sky Sports he had "offered a huge amount of money" to make the fight happen and while he conceded Brook might have to travel to America, Vargas insists he was willing to cross the Atlantic. Vargas signed his contract, manager, Cameron Dunkin, told ESPN.com on June 1. Eddie Hearn said the fight will take place August 27 or September 3 at Bramall Lane in Sheffield. Vargas would be making his biggest purse at $1.7 million, by a lot. Vargas confirmed via his Twitter account that the bout was set for September 3. Negotiations fell through on July 9 for the unification title fight, when it was announced that Brook would be moving up two weight divisions to challenge Gennady Golovkin instead.

==== Vargas vs. Pacquiao ====
Sky Sports announced on 4 August 2016, Vargas would defend his WBO welterweight title against eight-division world champion Manny Pacquiao (58–6–2, 38 KOs), coming out of retirement, on November 5. It was also reported that promoter Bob Arum was looking to hold the fight in Las Vegas or Dubai. The fight took place at the Thomas & Mack Centre in Las Vegas, in front of a crowd of 16,132, which included retired pound for pound king Floyd Mayweather Jr. Vargas earned a guaranteed base purse of a career high $2.8 million for the fight.

Vargas lost his WBO title after losing via unanimous decision. The judges scored the fight 114–113, 118–109 and 118–109 in favour of Pacquiao. Vargas thought he had done enough to retain his title, after the first score of 114–113 was read, he climbed on to the corner raising his arms in the air, only for Pacquiao to be read out the eventual victor. After a steady first round, Pacquiao woke the crowd up in the second round when he hit Vargas with a straight left hand that put him on the mat. The knockdown set the tone for the rest of the fight which had action back and forth. Vargas seemed to have picked up in the middle rounds, but it was Pacquiao who was the more dominant one throughout the 12-rounds. Vargas managed to land a few hard right hands, but none were enough to turn the scores in his favour. In the post-fight interview, Vargas had no excuses, claiming he 'lost to a legend'. CompuBox stats showed Pacquiao as the more accurate of the two, landing 147 of 409 punches (36%). Vargas landed on 104 of his 562 thrown (19%).

==== Vargas vs. Herrera ====
Vargas was a name considered for Miguel Cotto's (41–5, 33 KOs) final fight in December 2017. Cotto picked Vargas' old foe Sadam Ali as his final professional fight. On October 18, Vargas stated the reason why he turned down the Cotto fight was simply because Golden Boy Promotions did not offer him a good enough deal. Part of the deal would have been that Vargas sign a multi-fight deal with Golden Boy, a similar offer which was also rejected by Mikey Garcia and Errol Spence. Vargas, at this time was a free agent after coming to an undisclosed agreement with Top Rank. He started working with boxing advisor Al Haymon. Vargas also slammed Cotto's decision to fight Ali, after he himself knocked him out in 9 rounds in 2016. On November 11, it was announced that Vargas would finally return to the ring in California against fringe Mexican boxer Aaron Herrera (33–7–1, 22 KOs) on December 15, 2017. The Pioneer Event Center in Lancaster, California, was announced as the venue for the bout, which would be shown live on PBC on FS1. Prior to the fight, Vargas replaced trainer Dewey Cooper with former three-weight world champion Mike McCallum. Vargas made a successful return after 13 months, defeating Herrera by a lopsided 10 round unanimous decision. Vargas did not look as though he wanted to end the fight via stoppage. Vargas did knock Herrera down with a combination to the head in round 6. All three judges' scored the fight 100–89 in favour of Vargas. Vargas admitted there was ring rust but stated he wanted a big name next.

In January 2018, according to sources, Vargas was being lined up to challenge unified welterweight champion Keith Thurman on his return. On January 24, Showtime announced that Thurman would return to the Barclays Center for the third consecutive time on May 29 and Thurman denied any rumours, stating that he would not be fighting Vargas.

==== Vargas vs. Broner ====
On January 24, Showtime announced Adrien Broner vs. Omar Figueroa Jr. (27–0–1, 19 KOs) would take place on April 21 at the Barclays Center in New York. On March 4, Figueroa pulled out of the fight after injuring his shoulder in training. PBC stated the card would still go ahead and they would find a new opponent for Broner. The next day, Showtime confirmed that Broner (33–3, 24 KOs) would now fight Vargas in a 144-pound Catchweight bout, headlining a card also featuring the re-booked Jermall Charlo-Hugo Centeno Jr. fight and Gervonta Davis-Jesús Cuellar.

The attendance for the event was 13,964. With the arena only set up for 10,000, additional sections were opened in the upper tiers. Broner and Vargas fought to a 12-round majority draw. One judge scored the fight 115–113 for Broner and the remaining two judges overruled with identical scores of 114–114. ESPN's Dan Rafael and Showtimes unofficial scorer Steve Farhood both scored the bout 114–114. The fight was of two halves. The first half of the fight saw Vargas take up a nice lead, controlling the bout and then looked to fade a little, allowing Broner to take control for the remainder of the bout. Vargas out landed Broner 124–82 in the opening 6 rounds and Broner out landed Vargas 112–79 in the remaining 6 rounds. After the fight, Vargas said, "I saw myself winning, but if the judges said it was a draw, you have to respect that. I think it was a good fight. The fans seemed to like it. I hit the body, I worked inside. In the beginning I worked the distance. In the later rounds I let him come at me and was looking for the counterpunch." According to CompuBox Stats, Broner landed 194 of 507 punches thrown (38%) and Vargas landed 203 of his 839 thrown (24%). Vargas worked on the body more, landing 54 punches to 38 landing by Broner. For the fight Broner earned a $1 million purse and Vargas earned a $500,000 purse. The fight averaged 782,000 viewers and peaked at 869,000 during the bout. Peak viewership increased to 891,000 just before the scorecards were read.

==== Vargas vs. Dulorme ====
On July 17, 2018, at an official press conference, it was announced that Vargas had signed a multi fight deal with Eddie Hearn's Matchroom Boxing USA, which would see him fight exclusively on DAZN. On August 4, BoxingScene reported a fight between Vargas and former world title challenger Thomas Dulorme (24–3, 16 KOs) was being negotiated and close to being a done deal to take place on October 6 in Chicago, Illinois. Four days later, at the official press conference, the fight was announced to take place at the Wintrust Arena. It was said that Vargas would headline the card, which would include the likes of Jarrell Miller, Artur Beterbiev and Danny Roman. The WBC announced their vacant Silver belt would be at stake. Before 6,235 in attendance, both boxers traded knockdowns as the fight went the 12 round distance. One judge had the score 115–111 for Vargas, the second judge had the repeat score, in favour of Dulorme and the third judge scored the fight 113–113 even, declaring the fight a split decision draw, Vargas' second consecutive draw. Dulorme showed the better hand speed and punching power than Vargas.The 12 rounds was mostly back and forth action. Vargas suffered a cut over his right eye due to an accidental clash of heads in round 2. Vargas had a good round 4, even with blood covering his face, where he landed multiple right hands, forcing Dulorme to hold. Vargas' cut re-opened following a left hand from Dulorme in 8th round. In round 10, Vargas dropped Dulorme to one knee after landing a clean right hand. Dulorme managed to get to his feet by the 8 count and did not appear hurt. In the final moments of the fight, Dulorme landed clean on Vargas' chin, forcing a glove to touch the canvas. Had Dulorme not knocked Vargas down in round 12, Vargas would have walked away the winner and new WBC Silver champion. After the fight, Vargas was okay with the draw and knew it was a tough fight. Dulorme refused to be interviewed. According to Compubox, Vargas landed 122 of 521 punches thrown (23%) and Dulorme landed 124 of his 420 thrown (30%).

=== Light middleweight ===
==== Vargas vs. Soto ====
On October 17, 2018, Vargas stated his intention was to return to the ring by March 2019. In January 2019, Vargas called out Kell Brook for a fight on April 6, 2019, the date Vargas was looking return on. According to Vargas, the bout would take place in the United States and at the welterweight limit. A month later, Vargas advised that he had accepted the terms to fight and was waiting on Brook to agree. Vargas began training with legendary trainer Freddie Roach on January 24, 2019. In February, it was confirmed that Vargas would move up light middleweight and make his return on the rematch of Srisaket Sor Rungvisai vs. Juan Francisco Estrada at The Forum in Los Angeles on April 26, 2019. On March 6, 38 year old Humberto Soto (69–9–2, 37 KOs) became a front-runner to fight Vargas in a catchweight bout. On March 13, the fight was confirmed to take place at 150 pounds catchweight. In front of 5,127 at The Forum, Vargas stopped Soto in round 6 via TKO, in their scheduled 10 round bout. Using his height advantage, Vargas dropped Soto with a right hand to the head in round 6. After Soto got back up, Vargas landed a barrage of shots that led to referee Thomas Taylor waiving off the fight with Soto trapped against the ropes The time of the stoppage was at 1 minute 48 seconds of round 6. Prior to the stoppage, Vargas suffered a cut over his left eye in round 2 from a clash of heads. Both fighters came together, and their heads bumped. With Soto being shorter, the top of his head came in contact with Vargas’ left eye, and opened up a bad cut. In round 3, Soto hurt Vargas with a right hand to the head. In round 5, Vargas came alive and hurt Soto with hooks. CompuBox showed that Vargas connected on 131 of 402 shots thrown (33%) and Soto landed 85 of 365 punches for a 23% connect percentage. In the post-fight interviews, Vargas said, I was looking for the big shots, looking for body shots. But he is a crafty veteran and he proved that tonight. I just tried to dictate the pace (...) "I am ready for whatever is next. I am ready for anyone. I want a world championship." Vargas was paid $1.2 million and Soto was given a $150,000 purse for the fight.

=== Return to welterweight ===
==== Vargas vs. Garcia ====
On February 29, 2020, Vargas returned to the ring in Frisco, Texas. Moving back down to the welterweight division, he faced former four-division world champion Mikey Garcia. Garcia was ranked #3 by the WBA at welterweight. In a hard-fought battle, Garcia dropped Vargas in the fifth round and won a unanimous decision, with scores of 114-113, 116-111, and 116-111. CompuBox punch stats saw Garcia land 151 of 478 (32%) total punches thrown, while Vargas landed 142 punches of 671 (21%) total punches thrown. In his post-fight interview, Vargas praised his opponent, saying, "Mikey fought a great fight. I give him credit."

== Professional wrestling ==
On June 12, 2022, Vargas made an appearance at Dominion 6.12 in Osaka-jo Hall, an event made by New Japan Pro Wrestling as a member of the United Empire.

== Professional boxing record ==
35 fights	29 wins	4 losses
By knockout	11	1
By decision	18	3
Draws	2	

No.	Result	Record	Opponent	Type	Round, time	Date	Location	Notes
35	Loss	29–4–2	Liam Smith	TKO	10 (12), 0:41	Apr 30, 2022	Madison Square Garden, New York City, New York, U.S.	
34	Loss	29–3–2	Mikey Garcia	UD	12	Feb 29, 2020	Ford Center at The Star, Frisco, Texas, U.S.	
33	Win	29–2–2	Humberto Soto	TKO	6 (10), 1:48	Apr 26, 2019	The Forum, Inglewood, California, U.S.	
32	Draw	28–2–2	Thomas Dulorme	SD	12	Oct 6, 2018	Wintrust Arena, Chicago, Illinois, U.S.	For vacant WBC Silver welterweight title
31	Draw	28–2–1	Adrien Broner	MD	12	Apr 21, 2018	Barclays Center, New York City, New York, U.S.	
30	Win	28–2	Aaron Herrera	UD	10	Dec 15, 2017	Pioneer Event Center, Lancaster, California, U.S.	
29	Loss	27–2	Manny Pacquiao	UD	12	Nov 5, 2016	Thomas & Mack Center, Paradise, Nevada, U.S.	Lost WBO welterweight title
28	Win	27–1	Sadam Ali	TKO	9 (12), 2:09	Mar 5, 2016	D.C. Armory, Washington, D.C., U.S.	Won vacant WBO welterweight title
27	Loss	26–1	Timothy Bradley	UD	12	Jun 27, 2015	StubHub Center, Carson, California, U.S.	For vacant WBO interim welterweight title
26	Win	26–0	Antonio DeMarco	UD	12	Nov 22, 2014	Cotai Arena, Macau, SAR	Retained WBA (Regular) super lightweight title
25	Win	25–0	Anton Novikov	UD	12	Aug 2, 2014	Cosmopolitan of Las Vegas, Paradise, Nevada, U.S.	Retained WBA (Regular) super lightweight title
24	Win	24–0	Khabib Allakhverdiev	UD	12	Apr 12, 2014	MGM Grand Garden Arena, Paradise, Nevada, U.S.	Won WBA (Regular) and IBO super lightweight titles
23	Win	23–0	Ray Narh	UD	10	Oct 11, 2013	Thomas & Mack Center, Paradise, Nevada, U.S.	
22	Win	22–0	Wale Omotoso	UD	10	Mar 16, 2013	Home Depot Center, Carson, California, U.S.	Won vacant WBC Continental Americas welterweight title
21	Win	21–0	Vito Gasparyan	UD	10	Dec 7, 2012	Texas Station, North Las Vegas, Nevada, U.S.	
20	Win	20–0	Aaron Martinez	UD	10	Sep 13, 2012	The Joint, Paradise, Nevada, U.S.	
19	Win	19–0	Steve Forbes	UD	10	May 5, 2012	MGM Grand Garden Arena, Paradise, Nevada, U.S.	
18	Win	18–0	Lanardo Tyner	UD	10	Feb 24, 2012	The Joint, Paradise, Nevada, U.S.	
17	Win	17–0	Josesito López	SD	10	Sep 17, 2011	MGM Grand Garden Arena, Paradise, Nevada, U.S.	
16	Win	16–0	Walter Estrada	KO	2 (10), 0:38	Jul 8, 2011	Star of the Desert Arena, Primm, Nevada, U.S.	
15	Win	15–0	Vivian Harris	RTD	1 (10), 3:00	Apr 8, 2011	Star of the Desert Arena, Primm, Nevada, U.S.	
14	Win	14–0	Cristian Favela	UD	8	Feb 24, 2011	Nokia Theatre L.A. Live, Los Angeles, California, U.S.	
13	Win	13–0	Ramón Montaño	UD	8	Dec 11, 2010	Mandalay Bay Events Center, Paradise, Nevada, U.S.	
12	Win	12–0	Daniel Sarmiento	KO	1 (8), 1:31	Sep 30, 2010	Nokia Theatre L.A. Live, Los Angeles, California, U.S.	
11	Win	11–0	Ernesto Zavala	KO	6 (6), 0:33	Jun 24, 2010	Nokia Theatre L.A. Live, Los Angeles, California, U.S.	
10	Win	10–0	Arturo Morua	TKO	6 (8), 1:20	May 1, 2010	MGM Grand Garden Arena, Paradise, Nevada, U.S.	
9	Win	9–0	Robert Luna Jr.	TKO	1 (6), 1:56	Feb 25, 2010	Nokia Theatre L.A. Live, Los Angeles, California, U.S.	
8	Win	8–0	Rickey Kinney	UD	4	Jan 29, 2010	The Joint, Paradise, Nevada, U.S.	
7	Win	7–0	Travis Hartman	TKO	2 (6), 2:31	Dec 2, 2009	Liacouras Center, Philadelphia, Pennsylvania, U.S.	
6	Win	6–0	Raul Tovar	UD	6	Sep 19, 2009	MGM Grand Garden Arena, Paradise, Nevada, U.S.	
5	Win	5–0	Anthony Lenk	UD	6	Apr 17, 2009	Star of the Desert Arena, Primm, Nevada, U.S.	
4	Win	4–0	Antonio Sorria	UD	4	Dec 5, 2008	Chumash Casino Resort, Santa Ynez, California, U.S.	
3	Win	3–0	Michael Lynks	RTD	2 (4), 3:00	Nov 1, 2008	Home Depot Center, Carson, California, U.S.	
2	Win	2–0	Trenton Titsworth	UD	4	Oct 4, 2008	Pechanga Resort & Casino, Temecula, California, U.S.	
1	Win	1–0	Joel Gonzalez	KO	1 (4), 0:59	Sep 5, 2008	Star of the Desert Arena, Primm, Nevada, U.S.	

== Pay-per-view bouts ==
United States
Date	Fight	Billing	Buys	Network	Revenue
November 5, 2016	Pacquiao vs. Vargas	The Legend/The Champ	300,000	Top Rank	$18,000,000

== See also ==
- List of Mexican boxing world champions

Sporting positions
Regional boxing titles
Vacant Title last held by Ronald Cruz	WBC Continental Americas welterweight champion March 16, 2013 – October 2013; Vacated	Vacant Title next held by Dusty Hernández-Harrison
Minor world boxing titles
Preceded by Khabib Allakhverdiev	IBO super lightweight champion April 12, 2014 – August 2014; Vacated	Vacant Title next held by Eduard Troyanovsky
Major world boxing titles
Preceded by Khabib Allakhverdiev	WBA super lightweight champion Regular title April 12, 2014 – June 27, 2015; Vacated	Vacant Title next held by Mario Barrios
Vacant Title last held by Timothy Bradley	WBO welterweight champion March 5, 2016 – November 5, 2016	Succeeded by Manny Pacquiao
