= Daniel Sarmiento =

Argentine boxer

Pablo Daniel Sarmiento
Personal information
- Nickname: El Hueso
- Born: 10 June 1971 (age 55) Las Varillas, Cordoba, Argentina
- Height: 180 cm (5 ft 11 in)
- Weight: Light Welterweight

Boxing career
- Reach: 183 cm (72 in)
- Stance: Orthodox

Boxing record
- Total fights: 50
- Wins: 34
- Win by KO: 16
- Losses: 14
- Draws: 2
- No contests: 0

Pablo Daniel Sarmiento (born 10 June 1971) is an Argentine former professional boxer in the Light Welterweight division and the former IBO Light Welterweight Champion. He is the brother of boxing trainer Gabriel Sarmiento. He replaced his brother Gabriel as Sergio Martínez's trainer in March 2011.

== Professional career ==
In March 1997, Sarmiento won the WBO Latino Super Featherweight Championship by beating Andre Nicola, at the time Nicola had a record of 14–1.

=== IBO Light Welterweight Championship ===
On 14 July 2001, he won his first world title by knocking out the IBO Light Welterweight Champion Billy Schwer in Wembley, London.

After six years, Pablo returned from retirement to box against undefeated Mexican American Jesse Vargas, losing on the 1 round by KO. The bout was the main event of FSN's Fight Night Club.

== Professional record ==
34 Wins (16 Knockouts), 14 Defeats, 2 Draws
Res.	Record	Opponent	Type	Rd., Time	Date	Location	Notes
Loss	34-14-2	(United States) Jessie Vargas	KO	1 (8)	2010-09-30	(United States) Club Nokia, Los Angeles, California, USA	
Loss	34-13-2	(United Kingdom) Colin Lynes	SD	12 (12)	2004-05-08	Goresbrook Leisure Centre, Dagenham, Essex, United Kingdom	For IBO light welterweight title
Win	34-12-2	(United Kingdom) Gary Ryder	TKO	8 (12)	2003-03-08	York Hall, Bethnal Green, London, United Kingdom	Retained IBO light welterweight title
Win	33-12-2	(South Africa) Stephanus Carr	KO	2 (12)	2002-03-02	Carnival City, Brakpan, Gauteng, South Africa	Retained IBO light welterweight title
Win	32-12–2	(United Kingdom) Michael Ayers	UD	12 (12)	2001-11-10	Conference Centre, Wembley, London, United Kingdom	Retained IBO light welterweight title
Win	31-12-2	(United Kingdom) Billy Schwer	TKO	11 (12)	2001-07-14	Conference Centre, Wembley, London, United Kingdom	Won IBO light welterweight title
Draw	30-12-2	(Spain) Miguel Angel Pena	PTS	6 (6)	2001-05-25	Palau Blaugrana-2, Barcelona, Cataluña, Spain	
Win	30-12-1	(Portugal) Carlos Rocha Tomar	KO	2 (6)	2000-07-22	Guadalajara, Jalisco, Mexico	
Win	29-12-1	(Argentina) Ricardo Daniel Silva	SD	10 (10)	2000-02-12	Club Atletico Quilmes, Mar del Plata, Buenos Aires, Argentina	
Loss	28-12-1	(United States) Eddie Hopson	UD	8 (8)	1999-11-19	(United States) Grand Casino, Tunica, Mississippi, USA	
Loss	28-11-1	(United Kingdom) Michael Ayers	TKO	6 (12)	1999-10-02	International Arena, Cardiff, Wales, United Kingdom	
Loss	28-10-1	(Germany) Oktay Urkal	UD	12 (12)	1999-07-10	Sporthalle, Augsburg, Bayern, Germany	For WBC International light welterweight title
Win	28-9-1	(Argentina) Eduardo Bartolome Morales	UD	12 (12)	1999-06-18	Casino del Sol, Termas de Río Hondo, Santiago del Estero, Argentina	Retain South American lightweight title
Win	27-9-1	(Argentina) Victor Hugo Paz	SD	12 (12)	1999-04-11	Estadio Delmi, Salta, Salta, Argentina	Won South American lightweight title
Loss	26-9-1	(France) Bruno Wartelle	UD	12 (12)	1999-02-16	Saint-Quentin, Aisne, France	For WBC International lightweight title
Loss	26-8-1	(Uruguay) Wilson Enrique Galli	PTS	12 (12)	1998-12-04	Club Ferro Carril Salto, Salto, Uruguay	For South American lightweight title
Win	26-7-1	(Argentina) Ruben Dario Oliva	UD	10 (10)	1998-11-06	Estudios de ATC, Buenos Aires, Distrito Federal, Argentina	
Draw	25-7-1	(Argentina) Alfio Antonio Ruiz	PTS	8 (8)	1998-08-15	Estadio F.A.B., Buenos Aires, Distrito Federal, Argentina	
Win	25-7	(Argentina) Dante Fabian Tablada	TKO	3 (10)	1998-07-18	Buenos Aires, Distrito Federal, Argentina	

== See also ==
- List of IBO world champions
- Notable boxing families
