= DeMarcus Corley =

American boxer (born 1974)

Personal information
- Nickname: Chop Chop
- Born: DeMarcus Deon Corley; June 3, 1974 (age 52) Washington, D.C., U.S.
- Height: 5 ft 7 in (170 cm)
- Weight: Lightweight; Light welterweight; Welterweight

Boxing career
- Reach: 70 in (178 cm)
- Stance: Southpaw

Boxing record
- Total fights: 89
- Wins: 52
- Win by KO: 28
- Losses: 36
- Draws: 1

DeMarcus Deon Corley (born June 3, 1974) is an American professional boxer. A veteran of the sport for more than two decades, he held the WBO junior welterweight title from 2001 to 2003, and has fought as a gatekeeper against many of boxing's biggest names.

== Amateur career ==
Corley was an amateur standout, and won the National Golden Gloves Light Welterweight Championship in 1995. Corley also had a record of 100-19.

== Professional career ==
Corley began boxing professionally on May 17, 1996, knocking out Aaron Smith in the first round. Corley would not lose a match until 1999, against Daniel Lujan. Later that year in his 22nd bout with a record of 21 wins 1 defeat (11KO), he faced Ener Julio for the USBA light welterweight title. He won via a 12-round split decision.

=== WBO light welterweight champion ===
In 2001 Corley would stop Felix Flores in the first round to win the WBO light welterweight belt. He would later defeat Ener Julio again to defend his belt.

Corley took 2002 off from boxing to recover from the murder of his brother. This murder left Corley to care for his brother’s 7 children on top of the 7 children he already had. He returned to the ring on January 4, 2003.

==== Loss to Judah ====
After the Bernard Hopkins vs. Morrade Hakkar bout in Philadelphia in March 2003, Corley was involved in a brawl at a bar with former light welterweight champion Zab Judah which had to be broken up by the police

On the undercard of the rematch between Ricardo Mayorga and Vernon Forrest in July, Corley and Judah met in the ring. Corley was dropped by a looping left from Judah in the third round. He would work himself back into the bout during the middle rounds but Judah was able to control most of the fight by jabbing and moving and making Corley miss with his best punches.

At the end of 12 rounds judge Duane Ford, scored it 115–112 for Corley while judges Chuck Giampa and Michael Pernik, scored it 115–112 for Judah, giving him a split decision victory. HBO's unofficial scorer Harold Lederman had it 116–111 for Judah.

==== Cotto challenge ====
In February 2005 Corley attempted to win back his WBO belt against Miguel Cotto, losing by 5th round TKO.

=== WBC title shot ===
In 2006 Corley fought Junior Witter for the vacant WBC light welterweight championship, losing a wide decision in a very tactical bout.

=== Later career ===
After many consecutive losses, Corley took on Damian Fuller in 2010 and improved his record to 37-13-1 (21 KOs) with a 4th-round TKO.

On August 28, 2010, Corley lost to Marcos Maidana by unanimous decision in a fight in which was disputed, for the WBA light welterweight title.

On November 14, 2010, Corley lost to Serhiy Fedchenko by unanimous decision in a fight in which was also disputed, for the vacant WBO European light welterweight title.

On January 21, 2012, Corley won the vacant NABF light welterweight title when he defeated Gabriel Bracero by unanimous decision.

=== Bare knuckle boxing ===
On March 19, 2021, Corley fought Reggie Barnett Jr in BKFC 16. He lost the fight via retirement after the fourth round.

== Professional boxing record ==
89 fights	52 wins	36 losses
By knockout	28	9
By decision	24	27
Draws	1	

No.	Result	Record	Opponent	Type	Round, time	Date	Location	Notes
89	Loss	52–36–1	Michael Williams Jr.	UD	10	Oct 26, 2024	Crown Coliseum, Fayetteville, North Carolina, US	
88	Loss	52–35–1	Jon Bryant	MD	6	May 5, 2023	801 Event Center, Salt Lake City, Utah, US	
87	Loss	52–34–1	Derrick Murray	RTD	4 (6), 3:00	Oct 29, 2022	Jackson, Tennessee, US	
86	Win	52–33–1	Lenwood Dozier	UD	6	Oct 29, 2021	Entertainment and Sports Arena, Washington, DC, US	
85	Loss	51–33–1	Custio Clayton	TKO	6 (8), 0:36	Mar 29, 2019	Mattamy Events Centre, Toronto, Ontario, Canada	
84	Loss	51–32–1	Mykal Fox	UD	10	Aug 18, 2018	Live! Casino & Hotel, Hanover, Maryland, U.S.	
83	Loss	51–31–1	Vivian Harris	UD	12	Jul 21, 2018	FedExForum, Memphis, Tennessee, U.S.	For vacant ABF Continental Americas light welterweight title
82	Loss	51–30–1	Aik Shakhnazaryan	UD	10	Jun 9, 2018	Olimp, Krasnodar, Russia	For vacant WBA Asia interim light welterweight title
81	Win	51–29–1	Patrick López	UD	12	Apr 4, 2018	Eko Hotels and Towers Convention Hall, Lagos, Nigeria	Won vacant WBU (German version) lightweight title
80	Loss	50–29–1	Hank Lundy	UD	8	Feb 10, 2018	2300 Arena, Philadelphia, Pennsylvania, U.S.	
79	Win	50–28–1	Ramel Lewis	UD	8	Jul 12, 2017	Mico University College, Kingston, Jamaica	
78	Win	49–28–1	Vivian Harris	UD	10	May 20, 2017	Convention Center, Raleigh, North Carolina, U.S.	Won vacant UBF All America welterweight title
77	Loss	48–28–1	Jovanie Santiago	UD	10	Apr 7, 2017	Coliseo Antonio R. Barceló, Toa Baja, Puerto Rico	For vacant UBF International light welterweight title
76	Win	48–27–1	Dexter Gonzales	MD	12	Aug 27, 2016	Giftland Office Max, Georgetown, Guyana	Won vacant WBC FECARBOX lightweight title
75	Win	47–27–1	Richard Holmes	KO	7 (10)	Jun 15, 2016	National Indoor Sports Complex, Kingston, Jamaica	
74	Win	46–27–1	Michael Gardener	SD	7	Jun 15, 2016	Chinese Benevolent Association Auditorium, Kingston, Jamaica	
73	Win	45–27–1	Revlon Lake	KO	1 (5), 0:55	May 25, 2016	Chinese Benevolent Association Auditorium, Kingston, Jamaica	
72	Loss	44–27–1	Adrian Estrella	MD	12	Apr 16, 2016	Gimnasio Nuevo León Unido, Monterrey, Mexico	For WBC Latino interim lightweight title
71	Win	44–26–1	Iwan Azore	UD	5	Mar 16, 2016	Chinese Benevolent Association Auditorium, Kingston, Jamaica	
70	Win	43–26–1	Osama Hadifi	TKO	6 (8), 0:42	Feb 26, 2016	Ceres Arena, Aarhus, Denmark	
69	Loss	42–26–1	Anthony Yigit	RTD	3 (8), 3:00	Dec 19, 2015	Rosvalla Eventcenter, Nyköping, Sweden	
68	Loss	42–25–1	Bahodir Mamadjonov	UD	8	Oct 31, 2015	NRG Arena, Houston, Texas, U.S.	
67	Loss	42–24–1	Nery Saguilán	UD	12	Aug 22, 2015	Gimnasio Municipal "Jose Neri Santos", Ciudad Juárez, Mexico	For WBC FECARBOX light welterweight title
66	Loss	42–23–1	Manuel Pérez	RTD	6 (10), 3:00	May 16, 2015	PT's Showclub, Denver, Colorado, U.S.	
65	Win	42–22–1	Daniel Attah	UD	10	Sep 20, 2014	Walter E. Washington Convention Center, Washington, D.C., U.S.	
64	Win	41–22–1	Dedrick Bell	KO	2 (10), 0:40	Aug 22, 2014	St. Pete Times Forum, Tampa, Florida, U.S.	
63	Loss	40–22–1	Franklin Mamani	UD	10	Dec 13, 2013	Coliseo Cerrado Julio Borelli Viterito, La Paz, Bolivia	For WBC FECARBOX and vacant WBC Latino interim light welterweight titles
62	Win	40–21–1	Javier Garcia	RTD	7 (8), 3:00	Oct 24, 2013	Renaissance Mayflower Hotel, Washington, D.C., U.S.	
61	Loss	39–21–1	Selçuk Aydın	RTD	4 (12), 3:00	Sep 27, 2013	Atatürk Spor Salonu, Tekirdağ, Turkey	For vacant WBC Mediterranean light welterweight title
60	Loss	39–20–1	Viktor Postol	UD	12	Oct 27, 2012	Club Sportlife, Kyiv, Ukraine	For WBC Silver International light welterweight title
59	Win	39–19–1	Paul McCloskey	TKO	10 (12), 2:28	May 5, 2012	King's Hall, Belfast, Northern Ireland	
58	Win	38–19–1	Gabriel Bracero	UD	10	Jan 21, 2012	Roseland Ballroom, New York City, New York, U.S.	Won WBC-NABF light welterweight title
57	Loss	37–19–1	Ruslan Provodnikov	UD	12	Dec 5, 2011	Palace of Sporting Games, Yekaterinburg, Russia	For vacant WBC–ABCO light welterweight title
56	Loss	37–18–1	Thomas Dulorme	UD	10	Jun 10, 2011	Roseland Ballroom, New York City, New York, U.S.	For vacant WBA–NABA welterweight title
55	Loss	37–17–1	Andre Gorges	SD	8	Mar 29, 2011	Fairmont Royal York, Toronto, Ontario, Canada	
54	Loss	37–16–1	Lucas Matthysse	TKO	8 (12)	Jan 21, 2011	Polideportivo Vicente Polimeni, Las Heras, Argentina	For vacant WBO Inter-Continental light welterweight title
53	Loss	37–15–1	Serhiy Fedchenko	UD	12	Nov 13, 2010	Sports Palace "Lokomotyv", Kharkiv, Ukraine	For vacant WBO European light welterweight title
52	Loss	37–14–1	Marcos Maidana	UD	12	Aug 28, 2010	Estadio Luna Park, Buenos Aires, Argentina	For WBA interim light welterweight title
51	Win	37–13–1	Damian Fuller	TKO	4 (8), 2:49	Jul 10, 2010	Patriot Center, Fairfax, Virginia, U.S.	
50	Loss	36–13–1	Freddy Hernández	KO	5 (10), 1:48	Feb 5, 2010	Chumash Casino Resort, Santa Ynez, California, U.S.	
49	Loss	36–12–1	Fariz Kazimov	SD	10	Nov 28, 2009	MTL Arena, Samara, Russia	
48	Win	36–11–1	Harrison Cuello	UD	8	Sep 26, 2009	Patriot Center, Fairfax, Virginia, U.S.	
47	Win	35–11–1	James Kimori	TKO	8 (8), 0:09	Aug 15, 2009	Daulet National Tennis Centre, Astana, Kazakhstan	
46	Win	34–11–1	Sidney Siqueira	TKO	8 (8), 2:58	May 9, 2009	Stadium Khadjimukan, Shymkent, Kazakhstan	
45	Loss	33–11–1	Hector Sanchez	UD	8	Apr 10, 2009	Desert Diamond Casino, Tucson, Arizona, U.S.	
44	Win	33–10–1	Wilson Enrique Galli	TKO	7 (10), 1:23	Feb 3, 2009	Sheraton Meadowlands, East Rutherford, New Jersey, U.S.	
43	Win	32–10–1	Donnell Logan	KO	1 (8), 1:07	Dec 13, 2008	Meydenbauer Center, Bellevue, Washington, U.S.	
42	Loss	31–10–1	Randall Bailey	UD	8	Oct 22, 2008	B.B. King Blues Club & Grill, New York City, New York, U.S.	
41	Loss	31–9–1	Ashley Theophane	UD	8	Jul 31, 2008	Frontier Field, Rochester, New York, U.S.	
40	Loss	31–8–1	Devon Alexander	UD	12	Jan 19, 2008	Madison Square Garden, New York City, New York, U.S.	For vacant WBC Continental Americas light welterweight title
39	Loss	31–7–1	Dairo Esalas	SD	8	Nov 30, 2007	DoubleTree Westshore, Tampa, Florida, U.S.	
38	Loss	31–6–1	José Alfaro	TKO	8 (10), 0:48	May 12, 2007	Pharaoh's Casino, Managua, Nicaragua	
37	Loss	31–5–1	Junior Witter	UD	12	Sep 15, 2006	Alexandra Palace, London, England	For vacant WBC light welterweight title
36	Win	31–4–1	Johnny Walker	TKO	9 (10), 0:48	Sep 17, 2005	Coushatta Casino Resort, Kinder, Louisiana, U.S.	
35	Win	30–4–1	Kevin Carter	UD	8	Feb 26, 2005	The Plex, North Charleston, South Carolina, U.S.	
34	Loss	29–4–1	Miguel Cotto	TKO	5 (12), 2:45	Feb 26, 2005	Coliseo Rubén Rodríguez, Bayamon, Puerto Rico	For WBO light welterweight title
33	Win	29–3–1	Darryl Tyson	UD	10	Dec 12, 2004	Walter E. Washington Convention Center, Washington, D.C., U.S.	
32	Loss	28–3–1	Floyd Mayweather Jr.	UD	12	May 22, 2004	Boardwalk Hall, Atlantic City, New Jersey, U.S.	
31	Loss	28–2–1	Zab Judah	SD	12	Jul 12, 2003	The Orleans, Paradise, Nevada, U.S.	Lost WBO light welterweight title
30	Win	28–1–1	Randall Bailey	UD	12	Jan 4, 2003	D.C. Armory, Washington, D.C., U.S.	Retained WBO light welterweight title
29	Win	27–1–1	Ener Julio	UD	12	Jan 19, 2002	Jai-Alai Fronton, Miami, Florida, U.S.	Retained WBO light welterweight title
28	Win	26–1–1	Felix Flores	TKO	1 (12), 2:49	Jun 30, 2001	Mandalay Bay Events Center, Paradise, Nevada, U.S.	Won vacant WBO light welterweight title
27	Win	25–1–1	Dillon Carew	UD	10	Apr 4, 2001	D.C. Tunnel, Washington, D.C., U.S.	
26	Win	24–1–1	Jerry Smith	TKO	5	Apr 22, 2000	Tianhe Stadium, Guangzhou, China	
25	Win	23–1–1	Salvador Montes	TKO	3	Apr 1, 2000	Yakama Legends Casino, Toppenish, Washington, U.S.	
24	Win	22–1–1	Sam Miller	TKO	5 (10), 1:10	Mar 3, 2000	Caesars Palace, Paradise, Nevada, U.S.	
23	Win	21–1–1	Harold Bennett	KO	1 (8), 1:05	Jan 19, 2000	Adam's Mark, Charlotte, North Carolina, U.S.	
22	Win	20–1–1	Ener Julio	SD	12	Sep 24, 1999	MCI Center, Washington, D.C., U.S.	Won vacant USBA light welterweight title
21	Win	19–1–1	Donnie Parker	PTS	10	Jun 26, 1999	Washington, D.C., U.S.	
20	Win	18–1–1	Mike Tidline El	TKO	7 (10)	Apr 2, 1999	Washington, D.C., U.S.	
19	Loss	17–1–1	Daniel Lujan	SD	10	Mar 20, 1999	Chumash Casino Resort, Santa Ynez, California, U.S.	
18	Win	17–0–1	Sergio Pena	TKO	5	Feb 6, 1999	Convention Center, Washington, D.C., U.S.	
17	Draw	16–0–1	Dillon Carew	TD	3	Dec 5, 1998	Boardwalk Hall, Atlantic City, New Jersey, U.S.	
16	Win	16–0	Miguel Angel Olivares	UD	10	Oct 17, 1998	Seven Feathers Casino Resort, Canyonville, Oregon, U.S.	
15	Win	15–0	Gustavo Tapia	TKO	1 (8), 2:59	Aug 28, 1998	Paradise Casino, Yuma, Arizona, U.S.	
14	Win	14–0	Felix Marti	UD	8	May 2, 1998	Miccosukee Resort & Gaming, Miami, Florida, U.S.	
13	Win	13–0	Raymond Flores	UD	6	Jan 31, 1998	The Moon, Tallahassee, Florida, U.S.	
12	Win	12–0	Ali Muhammad	PTS	4	Oct 30, 1997	Washington, D.C., U.S.	
11	Win	11–0	Lahtovous Whitted	TKO	1	Oct 6, 1997	Washington, D.C., U.S.	
10	Win	10–0	Andre Gaddis	TKO	1	Aug 31, 1997	Annandale, Virginia, U.S.	
9	Win	9–0	Larry Landry	KO	2 (6), 2:08	Aug 5, 1997	Nashville, Tennessee, U.S.	
8	Win	8–0	Mauricio Rodriguez	TKO	1	Jun 7, 1997	Miami, Florida, U.S.	
7	Win	7–0	Ruben Aguayo	KO	1 (4), 1:08	Jan 25, 1997	Celebrity Theatre, Phoenix, Arizona, U.S.	
6	Win	6–0	Leon Hinnant	KO	2 (4), 1:05	Nov 14, 1996	Michael's Eighth Avenue, Glen Burnie, Maryland, U.S.	
5	Win	5–0	Antonio Pressley	PTS	4	Oct 19, 1996	The Show Place Arena, Upper Marlboro, Maryland, U.S.	
4	Win	4–0	Laszlo Komjathi	UD	4	Jul 19, 1996	Armory Palace, Silver Spring, Maryland, U.S.	
3	Win	3–0	Claude Staten	UD	4	Jul 11, 1996	Madison Square Garden, New York City, New York, U.S.	
2	Win	2–0	Dan Piffer	TKO	1	Jun 27, 1996	Virginia, U.S.	
1	Win	1–0	Aaron Smith	TKO	1 (4)	May 17, 1996	Washington, D.C., U.S.	

== Bare Knuckle Boxing Record ==
Professional record breakdown
1 match	0 wins	1 loss
By knockout	0	1
By submission	0	0
By decision	0	0

Res.	Record	Opponent	Method	Event	Date	Round	Time	Location	Notes
Loss	0–1	Reggie Barnett Jr.	TKO (retirement)	BKFC 16	March 16, 2021	4	2:00	Biloxi, Mississippi, United States	

Sporting positions
Amateur boxing titles
Previous: David Díaz	U.S. light welterweight champion 1995	Next: David Díaz
Regional boxing titles
Vacant Title last held by Zab Judah	USBA light welterweight champion September 24, 1999 – January 2000; Vacated	Vacant Title next held by Teddy Reid
Vacant Title last held by Gabriel Bracero	NABF light welterweight champion January 21, 2012 – May 2012; Vacated	Vacant Title next held by Dierry Jean
Vacant Title last held by Reynaldo Ojeda	WBC FECARBOX lightweight champion August 27, 2016 – September 2016; Vacated	Vacant Title next held by Fidel Guity
Vacant Title last held by Michael Anderson	UBF All America welterweight champion May 20, 2017 – October 2017; Vacated	Vacant Title next held by Mykal Fox
Vacant Title last held by Brett William Smith	WBU lightweight champion German title April 4, 2017 – June 2017; Vacated	Vacant
Major world boxing titles
Vacant Title last held by Ener Julio	WBO light welterweight champion June 30, 2001 – July 12, 2003	Succeeded by Zab Judah
