= Francisco Figueroa (boxer) =

Puerto Rican boxer (born 1978)

Frankie Figueroa
Personal information
- Nickname: El Gato
- Nationality: Puerto Rico
- Born: Francisco Figueroa; June 13, 1978 (age 48) Santurce, Puerto Rico
- Height: 5 ft 6 in (1.68 m)
- Weight: Light Welterweight

Boxing career
- Reach: 66 in (168 cm)
- Stance: Southpaw

Boxing record
- Total fights: 28
- Wins: 20
- Win by KO: 13
- Losses: 7
- Draws: 1
- No contests: 0

Francisco Figueroa Jr. (born June 13, 1978) is a professional boxer from Santurce, Puerto Rico and grew up in the Bronx, New York City, USA.

Nicknamed "El Gato", Figueroa has been featured numerous times on ESPN2 and HBO fights. On 17 August 2005 he defeated Hector Alejandro Jr. for the New York State Light Welterweight Title. He also fought a powerhouse bout at Madison Square Garden against another undefeated contender, Joey Rios, where he successfully defended the title.

Figueroa fought Emanuel "The Drunken Master" Augustus, in which he won on a controversial split decision, on the undercard of the Joe Calzaghe vs. Roy Jones Jr. fight at Madison Square Garden on 8 November 2008. However, some witnesses felt that Augustus, who had landed over 20 punches more than Figueroa, won the fight.

He knocked out Ubaldo Hernandez and defended the NABF Light Welterweight Title. He also beat high-ranked and undefeated opponent Francisco Rincon at Mid-Hudson Civic Center, in Poughkeepsie, New York. On 16 November, Figueroa made his second title defence against formidable opponent Noel Rodriguez. Figueroa won and retained his world title.

Figueroa was ranked fourth in the world and commands three minor regional titles. He linked up with trainer and former world champion, James "Buddy" McGirt, hoping for a chance for a world title in 2009. An opportunity at that title came when Figueroa faced former light welterweight champion Randall Bailey in an IBF title eliminator in early April 2009. Figueroa was knocked down in the opening round, but rallied back to score a flash knockdown in the second round. However, another right hand from Bailey floored Figueroa for the count in the fourth round.
