= Lenin Arroyo =

Costa Rican boxer

Personal information
- Nickname: Volcano
- Born: October 19, 1979 (age 46) San José, Costa Rica

Boxing career
- Stance: Orthodox

Boxing record
- Total fights: 37
- Wins: 20
- Win by KO: 4
- Losses: 15
- Draws: 1
- No contests: 1

Lenin Arroyo (born October 19, 1979) is a Costa Rican former professional boxer.

== Professional career ==
Arroyo aka "Volcano", made his professional debut on October 12, 2002, vs. Anolan Regal Del Valle at the South Florida Fairgrounds in West Palm Beach, Florida. winning by UD4.

After starting (2-3 1 NC), Arroyo went on to win 13 straight fights before meeting his first big test of his career March 24, 2006, at the Miccosukee Resort & Gaming center in Miami against former WBO & WBA Light Welterweight champion, Randall Bailey (29-5-0) & losing in UD8.

3 months later, Arroyo would fight former WBA Fedecentro, former WBO Latino, & former WBO Inter-Continental Light Welterweight champion, Arturo Morua (23-7-1) at the Desert Diamond Casino in Tucson, Arizona, and despite knocking down Morua, Arroyo lost his second straight fight by SD10. After a record of 0–2 to start the year in 2006, Arroyo defeated rising prospect, Haider Berrio (11-1 7 KOs) by UD6.

In April 2007, Arroyo headlined an eight bout card in a 12-round bout against Juan Carlos Rodriguez for the WBC Latin championship. It did not take long for Arroyo to show his heart, skill, and will and a beautiful left hook dropped Rodriguez down and out in the first round of the fight. Arroyo claimed the WBC Latin title in a card full of first round knock-outs. Arroyo later lost the title to Joaquin Gallardo in August 2007.

Record in Title fights
Won 1 (KOs 1)	Lost 1	Drawn 0	Total 2

Date	Opponent	W-L-D	Location	Result
2007-08-24	Joaquin Gallardo ~ WBC Latino Light Welterweight Title ~	17–6–1	Miccosukee Resort & Gaming, Miami, FL, U.S.	L UD 12
2007-4-20	Juan Carlos Rodriguez ~ WBC Latino Light Welterweight Title ~	53–20–2	Miccosukee Resort & Gaming, Miami, FL, U.S.	W KO 1
