= Randall Bailey =

American boxer (born 1974)

Personal information
- Nickname: The Knock-Out King
- Born: September 13, 1974 (age 52) Opa-locka, Florida, U.S.
- Height: 5 ft 9 in (175 cm)
- Weight: Light welterweight; Welterweight

Boxing career
- Reach: 70 in (178 cm)
- Stance: Orthodox

Boxing record
- Total fights: 56
- Wins: 46
- Win by KO: 37
- Losses: 9
- No contests: 1

Randall Bailey (born September 13, 1974) is an American former professional boxer who competed from 1996 to 2016. He is a former world champion in two weight classes, having held the World Boxing Organization (WBO) light welterweight title from 1999 to 2000, and the International Boxing Federation (IBF) welterweight title in 2012. Additionally, he held the World Boxing Association (WBA) interim light welterweight title in 2002. Nicknamed "The Knock-Out King" for his exceptional knockout power, Bailey is considered to be one of the hardest punchers in boxing history.

== Professional career ==
Bailey turned pro in 1996 and won his first 21 fights by knockout, including the WBO Light Welterweight Title with a 1st-round KO over Carlos Gonzalez in 1999. He defended the title twice before losing it in 2000 to Ener Julio in a close split decision.

In 2002, he won the interim WBA Light Welterweight title with a 3rd-round KO win over Demetrio Ceballos. He fought Diosbelys Hurtado for the vacant WBA Light Welterweight title but lost courtesy of a KO in the 7th round. In 2003, he challenged DeMarcus Corley for the WBO Light Welterweight Title but lost a decision. In 2004, he fought Miguel Angel Cotto for the WBO Light Welterweight Title, losing by TKO in the 6th round. The fight was stopped on cuts. In 2006, Bailey defeated Lenin Arroyo, Santos Pakau, Juan Polo Perez and Russell Stoner Jones to get the right to fight Shawn Gallegos for the IBA Intercontinental Light Welterweight title. He defeated Gallegos via a TKO inside eight rounds to become the new International Boxing Association Intercontinental champion. In 2007, he beat Harrison Cuello by KO in the 2nd round. He then fought Herman Ngoudjo and lost by a split decision over 12 rounds in an IBF eliminator bout. In 2008, Bailey fought a rematch with DeMarcus Corley and won via decision. In 2009, Bailey kayoed Frankie Figueroa in the fourth round of an IBF eliminator to win another shot at the IBF world title against Juan Urango. In the fight Bailey knocked down Juan Urango in the 6th round, the first time Urango had been knocked down. Bailey tired late in the fight and in the 11th round his corner threw in the towel after Urango had begun dominating the fight.

=== Moving up to welterweight ===
After the loss to Urango, Bailey moved up to 147 pounds and fought Germaine Sanders, whom Bailey knocked down three times before winning an 8-round decision. On March 19, 2010 Bailey fought an IBF title eliminator against Sugar Jackson. Bailey knocked out Jackson in 90 seconds of the 1st round. Instead of fighting the IBF Title against Jan Zaveck, he fought Said Ouali on December 10, 2010 in Antwerp, Belgium, with the fight resulting in a second round no-contest when Ouali was thrown out of the ring by Bailey and the fight could not continue.

Bailey became the IBF welterweight champion after knocking out top contender Mike Jones June 9, 2012, becoming a world champion in two weight divisions 10 years after winning his last title (the interim WBA light welterweight title). His emotional response in his post fight interview drew cheers from the crowd.

Bailey lost his IBF welterweight title against Devon Alexander as a main event on Showtime Championship Boxing. He then won three straight fights, culminating in a knockout win over Shusaku Fujinaka for the WBO Asia Pacific Welterweight title, before a loss to Jeff Horn on April 27, 2016. He has not fought since.

== Professional boxing record ==
56 fights	46 wins	9 losses
By knockout	39	4
By decision	6	5
By disqualification	1	0
No contests	1	

No.	Result	Record	Opponent	Type	Round, time	Date	Location	Notes
56	Loss	46–9 (1)	Jeff Horn	RTD	7 (12), 3:00	Apr 27, 2016	Convention & Exhibition Centre, Brisbane, Australia	For IBF Inter-Continental and vacant WBO Oriental welterweight titles
55	Win	46–8 (1)	Shusaku Fujinaka	KO	7 (12), 2:05	Oct 4, 2015	Seonhak Gymnasium, Incheon, South Korea	Won vacant WBO Asia Pacific welterweight title
54	Win	45–8 (1)	Gundrick King	KO	2 (10), 2:06	Jun 20, 2015	Centre for the Arts, Riverdale, California, U.S.	
53	Win	44–8 (1)	Humberto Toledo	DQ	8 (10), 2:15	Nov 23, 2013	Tampa, Florida, U.S.	Toledo disqualified for pushing the referee
52	Loss	43–8 (1)	Devon Alexander	UD	12	Oct 20, 2012	Barclays Center, New York City, New York, U.S.	Lost IBF welterweight title
51	Win	43–7 (1)	Mike Jones	KO	11 (12), 2:52	Jun 9, 2012	MGM Grand Garden Arena, Paradise, Nevada, U.S.	Won vacant IBF welterweight title
50	Win	42–7 (1)	Yoryi Estrella	UD	10	Sep 3, 2011	Beau Rivage, Biloxi, Mississippi, U.S.	
49	NC	41–7 (1)	Said Ouali	NC	2 (12)	Dec 10, 2010	Lotto Arena, Antwerp, Belgium	NC after Bailey threw Ouali out of the ring
48	Win	41–7	Sugar Jackson	TKO	1 (12)	Mar 19, 2010	Lotto Arena, Antwerp, Belgium	
47	Win	40–7	Germaine Sanders	UD	8	Dec 12, 2009	UIC Pavilion, Chicago, Illinois, U.S.	
46	Loss	39–7	Juan Urango	TKO	11 (12), 1:51	Aug 28, 2009	Hard Rock Live, Hollywood, Florida, U.S.	For IBF light welterweight title
45	Win	39–6	Francisco Figueroa	KO	4 (12), 1:46	Apr 3, 2009	Pepsi Pavilion, Memphis, Tennessee, U.S.	
44	Win	38–6	DeMarcus Corley	UD	8	Oct 22, 2008	B.B. King Blues Club & Grill, New York City, New York, U.S.	
43	Win	37–6	Dairo Esalas	KO	1 (8), 0:46	Aug 6, 2008	B.B. King Blues Club & Grill, New York City, New York, U.S.	
42	Win	36–6	Anthony Mora	TKO	5 (10), 2:30	Jan 18, 2008	Mallory Square, Key West, Florida, U.S.	Won vacant WBC Latino light welterweight title
41	Loss	35–6	Herman Ngoudjo	SD	12	Jun 8, 2007	Uniprix Stadium, Montreal, Quebec, Canada	
40	Win	35–5	Harrison Cuello	TKO	2 (10), 2:24	Jan 19, 2007	Mallory Square, Key West, Florida, U.S.	Retained IBA Intercontinental light welterweight title
39	Win	34–5	Shawn Gallegos	TKO	8 (10), 1:55	Oct 13, 2006	Hard Rock Live, Hollywood, Florida, U.S.	Won vacant IBA Intercontinental light welterweight title
38	Win	33–5	Russell Stoner Jones	TKO	4 (8), 2:06	Jul 28, 2006	Hard Rock Live, Hollywood, Florida, U.S.	
37	Win	32–5	Juan Polo Perez	KO	1 (8), 2:59	Jun 27, 2006	Sheraton Hotel, Miami, Florida, U.S.	
36	Win	31–5	Santos Pakau	KO	1 (10), 2:25	May 6, 2006	Quay Park, Key West, Florida, U.S.	
35	Win	30–5	Lenin Arroyo	UD	8	Mar 24, 2006	Miccosukee Resort & Gaming, Miami, Florida, U.S.	
34	Win	29–5	Roberto Ortega	UD	10	May 20, 2005	Miccosukee Resort & Gaming, Miami, Florida, U.S.	
33	Loss	28–5	Miguel Cotto	TKO	6 (12), 1:39	Dec 11, 2004	Mandalay Bay Events Center, Paradise, Nevada, U.S.	For WBO light welterweight title
32	Win	28–4	Lester Yarbrough	KO	5 (8), 0:26	Mar 19, 2004	Majestic Star Casino, Gary, Indiana, U.S.	
31	Loss	27–4	Ishe Smith	UD	12	Jan 15, 2004	Chumash Casino Resort, Santa Ynez, California, U.S.	For vacant WBC Continental Americas, WBO–NABO, and USBA welterweight titles
30	Win	27–3	Reggie Strickland	UD	8	May 17, 2003	Civic Center, Hammond, Indiana, U.S.	
29	Loss	26–3	DeMarcus Corley	UD	12	Jan 4, 2003	D.C. Armory, Washington, D.C., U.S.	For WBO light welterweight title
28	Win	26–2	Alfonso Fowler	TKO	1 (8), 2:53	Sep 27, 2002	Farm Bureau Building, Indianapolis, Indiana, U.S.	
27	Loss	25–2	Diosbelys Hurtado	KO	7 (12), 2:02	May 11, 2002	Roberto Clemente Coliseum, San Juan, Puerto Rico	For IBA and vacant WBA light welterweight titles
26	Win	25–1	Demetrio Ceballos	KO	3 (12), 1:03	Feb 2, 2002	Sovereign Center, Reading, Pennsylvania, U.S.	Won vacant WBA interim light welterweight title
25	Win	24–1	Bobby Elkins	TKO	1 (10)	Jun 8, 2001	Jai-Alai Fronton, Miami, Florida, U.S.	
24	Win	23–1	Anthony Cobb	KO	2 (8), 2:06	Jan 27, 2001	Johanning Civic Center, Kokomo, Indiana, U.S.	
23	Win	22–1	Billy Wooten	TKO	2 (8), 0:50	Nov 21, 2000	Pepsi Colliseum, Indianapolis, Indiana, U.S.	
22	Loss	21–1	Ener Julio	SD	12	Jul 22, 2000	American Airlines Arena, Miami, Florida, U.S.	Lost WBO light welterweight title
21	Win	21–0	Rocky Martinez	TKO	7 (12), 0:01	Apr 8, 2000	Palais omnisports, Paris, France	Retained WBO light welterweight title
20	Win	20–0	Héctor López	TKO	9 (12), 2:00	Nov 12, 1999	Grand Casino, Tunica, Mississippi, U.S.	Retained WBO light welterweight title
19	Win	19–0	Carlos González	KO	1 (12), 0:41	May 15, 1999	Jai-Alai Fronton, Miami, Florida, U.S.	Won WBO light welterweight title
18	Win	18–0	Rodney Wilson	TKO	3 (10), 0:01	Mar 6, 1999	UM Sports Pavilion, Minneapolis, Minnesota, U.S.	
17	Win	17–0	Manuel De Leon	TKO	2 (10), 2:59	Dec 18, 1998	Memorial Auditorium, Fort Lauderdale, Florida, U.S.	
16	Win	16–0	Jerry Strickland	TKO	2	Jul 18, 1998	Kokomo, Indiana, U.S.	
15	Win	15–0	Esteban Flores	TKO	1 (8), 2:26	Apr 30, 1998	Chili Pepper, Fort Lauderdale, Florida, U.S.	
14	Win	14–0	Randy McGee	KO	1 (8), 1:03	Feb 25, 1998	Columbia Club, Indianapolis, Indiana, U.S.	
13	Win	13–0	Jim Maloney	TKO	1	Dec 13, 1997	Amphitheater, Pompano Beach, Florida, U.S.	
12	Win	12–0	Lavoice Ward	TKO	1 (8)	Sep 30, 1997	InCahoots Nightclub, Indianapolis, Indiana, U.S.	
11	Win	11–0	Gerry Dill	KO	1 (4), 2:00	Aug 11, 1997	Argosy Casino, Kansas City, Missouri, U.S.	
10	Win	10–0	Israel Muhammad	TKO	5 (8)	Apr 29, 1997	InCahoots Nightclub, Indianapolis, Indiana, U.S.	
9	Win	9–0	Bobby Jones	TKO	7 (8)	Mar 4, 1997	Pepsi Coliseum, Indianapolis, Indiana, U.S.	
8	Win	8–0	Samuel Roberts	TKO	1 (6), 1:33	Feb 19, 1997	Columbia Club, Indianapolis, Indiana, U.S.	
7	Win	7–0	Jeff Elrod	KO	2	Nov 30, 1996	Glasgow, Kentucky, U.S.	
6	Win	6–0	Larry Sutton	TKO	1	Oct 15, 1996	Pepsi Coliseum, Indianapolis, Indiana, U.S.	
5	Win	5–0	Chris Yslas	TKO	1 (4)	Sep 20, 1996	James L. Knight Convention Center, Miami, Florida, U.S.	
4	Win	4–0	Randall Parker	TKO	1	Sep 14, 1996	Miami, Florida, U.S.	
3	Win	3–0	Teronie Watson	KO	1	Jul 27, 1996	Miami, Florida, U.S.	
2	Win	2–0	Travis Clybourn	KO	1	May 11, 1996	Miami, Florida, U.S.	
1	Win	1–0	Fernando Granda	TKO	1 (4)	Apr 4, 1996	Miami, Florida, U.S.	

== Titles in boxing ==
=== Major world titles ===
- WBO light welterweight champion (140 lbs)
- IBF welterweight champion (147 lbs)

=== Interim world titles ===
- WBA interim light welterweight champion (140 lbs)

=== Regional/International titles ===
- IBA Intercontinental light welterweight champion (140 lbs)
- WBC Latino light welterweight champion (140 lbs)
- WBO Asia Pacific welterweight champion (147 lbs)

Sporting positions
Regional boxing titles
Vacant Title last held by Javier Cubedo	WBC Latino light welterweight champion January 18, 2008 – December 2008; Vacated	Vacant Title next held by César Cuenca
Vacant Title last held by Larry Siwu	WBO Asia Pacific welterweight champion October 4, 2015 – December 2016; Vacated	Vacant Title next held by Jayar Inson
Vacant Title last held by Diosbelys Hurtado	IBA Intercontinental light welterweight champion October 13, 2006 – June 2007; Vacated	Title discontinued
Major world boxing titles
Preceded by Carlos González	WBO light welterweight champion May 15, 1999 – July 22, 2000	Succeeded by Ener Julio
New title	WBA light welterweight champion Interim title February 2, 2002 – May 11, 2002; Lost bid for full title	Vacant Title next held by Marcos Maidana
Vacant Title last held by Andre Berto	IBF welterweight champion June 9, 2012 – October 20, 2012	Succeeded by Devon Alexander
