= Michael Ayers (boxer) =

English boxer

Personal information
- Nickname: Shaka
- Nationality: British
- Born: 26 January 1965 (age 61) London, England
- Height: 5 ft 8 in (173 cm)
- Weight: Lightweight

Boxing career
- Reach: 71 in (180 cm)
- Stance: Orthodox

Boxing record
- Total fights: 37
- Wins: 31
- Win by KO: 27
- Losses: 5
- Draws: 1

Michael Ayers (born 26 January 1965) is a British former boxer who was British lightweight champion between 1995 and 1997 and IBO world lightweight champion between 1999 and 2001.

== Career ==
Born in London in 1965, Michael Ayers had a successful amateur career, winning the ABA lightweight title in 1987, before making his professional boxing debut in May 1989 with a win over Young Joe Rafiu. In June 1991 he beat Wayne Weekes to take the vacant BBBofC Southern Area lightweight title.

In October 1992 he stopped Scott Brouwer in the fourth round to take the WBC International title. He made a successful defence of this title in February 1993 against Danny Myburgh, setting up a challenge for Giovanni Parisi's WBO World lightweight title in April that year. Previously having a 100% record, Ayers suffered his first defeat with Parisi taking a unanimous points decision.

In February 1995 he beat Paul Burke to take the British lightweight title, stopping the defending champion in the sixth round. Over the next two years he made four successful defences, against Karl Taylor, Charles Shepherd, Dave Anderson, and Colin Dunne. He was due to fight again for the WBO World title in 1996 but the fight was postponed due to a shoulder injury sustained by the defending champion Artur Grigorian; a rescheduled fight in May 1997 was again postponed due to Grigorian's shoulder problems. The delays in getting to fight Grigorian led to Ayers relinquishing his British title in August 1997.

In March 1999 he stopped Luis Flores in the fourth round to take the vacant IBO World lightweight title. He made six successful defences of the World title, against Mkhuseli Kondile, Daniel Sarmiento, Tony Miller, Mehdi Labdouni, and twice against Wayne Rigby, the first of these voted 'British fight of the year' by Boxing News. A further defence against James Armah was cancelled due to a back injury sustained by Ayers. In November 2001 he moved up a weight to challenge for Sarmiento's IBO super lightweight title, losing via a unanimous points decision. Ayers relinquished his IBO lightweight title on 26 December, retiring from the sport.

Ayers returned to the ring in July 2003 to fight Jon Honney, but lost a six-round points decision, after which he retired for good.
