= Manuel Garnica (boxer) =

Mexican boxer (born 1974)

Personal information
- Nickname: Marro
- Born: Hector Manuel Garnica Venegas; 12 October 1974 (age 51) Guadalajara, Jalisco, Mexico
- Height: 1.74 m (5 ft 9 in)
- Weight: Light welterweight

Boxing career
- Reach: 180 cm (71 in)
- Stance: Orthodox

Boxing record
- Total fights: 36
- Wins: 25
- Win by KO: 13
- Losses: 11
- Draws: 0
- No contests: 0

Hector Manuel Garnica Venegas (born 12 October 1974) is a Mexican former professional boxer who competed from 1993 to 2009. He held the WBC Mundo Hispano, WBC Latino and WBA Fedecaribe light welterweight titles.

== Professional career ==
Hector took out the veteran Isaias Cabrera to win the WBC Mundo Hispano light welterweight title.

On August 25, 2006, he upset former WBA light welterweight Champion Carlos Maussa to win the WBC Latino and WBA Fedecaribe light welterweight titles.

Manuel would then go onto lose a fight with undefeated Mike Alvarado.
