= Antonio Pitalúa =

Colombian boxer

Eduardo Pitalua
Personal information
- Nationality: Colombian and Mexican
- Born: Eduardo Antonio Ospino Pitalua; February 21, 1970 (age 56) Monteria, Colombia
- Height: 5 ft 7 in (1.70 m)
- Weight: Light Welterweight

Boxing career
- Reach: 67 in (170 cm)
- Stance: Orthodox

Boxing record
- Total fights: 61
- Wins: 53
- Win by KO: 47
- Losses: 7
- Draws: 1
- No contests: 0

Antonio Pitalúa (born February 21, 1970) is a Colombian-Mexican boxer. His record is 48 wins (42 KO's) and 4 losses.
