= James Hare (boxer) =

English boxer

Personal information
- Nickname: Roberttown Rocket
- Nationality: English
- Born: 16 July 1976 (age 50) Dewsbury, England
- Height: 5 ft 7 in (170 cm)
- Weight: feather/lightweight, and light welter/welter/light middle/middleweight

Boxing career
- Stance: Orthodox

Boxing record
- Total fights: 37
- Wins: 33 (KO 19)
- Losses: 3 (KO 2)
- Draws: 1

James "Roberttown Rocket" Hare (born 16 July 1976 in Dewsbury) is an English amateur feather/lightweight and professional light welter/welter/light middle/middleweight boxer of the 1990s and 2000s who as an amateur was runner-up for the 1991 Amateur Boxing Association of England (ABAE) Junior Class-A featherweight (57 kg) title, against Daniel Happe (Honor Oak ABC), boxing out of Batley ABC, and won the 1992 Amateur Boxing Association of England (ABAE) Junior Class-B lightweight (60 kg) title, against George Robshaw (Dale Youth), boxing out of Batley and Dewsbury ABC, and as a professional won the European Boxing Union (EBU) European Union (EU) welterweight title, World Boxing Federation (WBF) welterweight title, and Commonwealth welterweight title, and was a challenger for the British Boxing Board of Control (BBBofC) British welterweight title against David Barnes, his professional fighting weight varied from 139 lb (63 kg; 9 st 13 lb), i.e. light welterweight to 155 lb (70 kg; 11 st 1 lb), i.e. middleweight.
