= Arturo Morua =

Mexican boxer (born 1978)

Personal information
- Nickname: El Silencioso
- Born: 3 May 1978 (age 48) Guadalajara, Jalisco, Mexico
- Height: 1.78 m (5 ft 10 in)
- Weight: Welterweight; Light welterweight

Boxing career
- Reach: 180 cm (71 in)
- Stance: Orthodox

Boxing record
- Total fights: 42
- Wins: 26
- Win by KO: 15
- Losses: 15
- Draws: 1
- No contests: 0

Arturo Morua (born 3 May 1978) is a Mexican professional boxer. He is a former WBA Fedecentro, WBO Latino, and WBO Inter-Continental Light Welterweight Champion. He has fought numerous times on Telefutura and Telemundo.

== Professional career ==
In October 2001, Morua took on Cosme Rivera (21-6-2) and defeated him by UD12 to win the WBA Fedecentro Light Welterweight Title.

=== WBC Light Welterweight Championship ===
In his first title match, Morua lost to WBC Champion Junior Witter.

=== WBO Light Welterweight Championship ===
Morua then lost a twelve-round decision to WBO Champion Ricardo Torres.

Morua has defeated boxers such as Emanuel Augustus, Omar Gabriel Weis, and Cosme Rivera.

=== Professional record ===
26 Wins (15 knockouts), 15 Losses, 1 Draw
Res.	Record	Opponent	Type	Rd., Time	Date	Location	Notes
Loss	26-15-1	(United States) Jessie Vargas	TKO	6 (8)	2010-05-01	(United States) MGM Grand, Las Vegas, Nevada, USA	
Loss	26-14-1	(Mexico) Juan Jesus Rivera	UD	10 (10)	2009-12-05	Tepic, Nayarit, Mexico	
Loss	26-13-1	(Dominican Republic) Victor Cayo	TKO	1 (9)	2009-05-30	(United States Virgin Islands) UVI Sports & Fitness Center, Charlotte Amalie, U.S. Virgin Islands	
Loss	26-12-1	(Cuba) Diosbelys Hurtado	TKO	3 (10)	2009-04-03	(United States) Miccosukee Indian Gaming Resort, Miami, Florida, USA	
Loss	26-11-1	(Argentina) Marcos Maidana	RTD	6 (12)	2008-04-19	Bordelandhalle, Magdeburg, Sachsen-Anhalt, Germany	
Win	26-10-1	(Mexico) Mario Alberto Mondragon	TKO	3 (10)	2008-02-29	Coliseo Olimpico de la UG, Guadalajara, Jalisco, Mexico	
Loss	25-10-1	(Puerto Rico) Alex De Jesus	UD	12 (12)	2007-07-20	(United States) Civic Center, Kissimmee, Florida, USA	
