= Saldivia =

Saldivia is a surname. Notable people with the surname include:

- Alan Saldivia (born 2002), Uruguayan footballer
- Hector Saldivia (born 1984), Argentine boxer
