= Kermit Cintrón =

Puerto Rican boxer

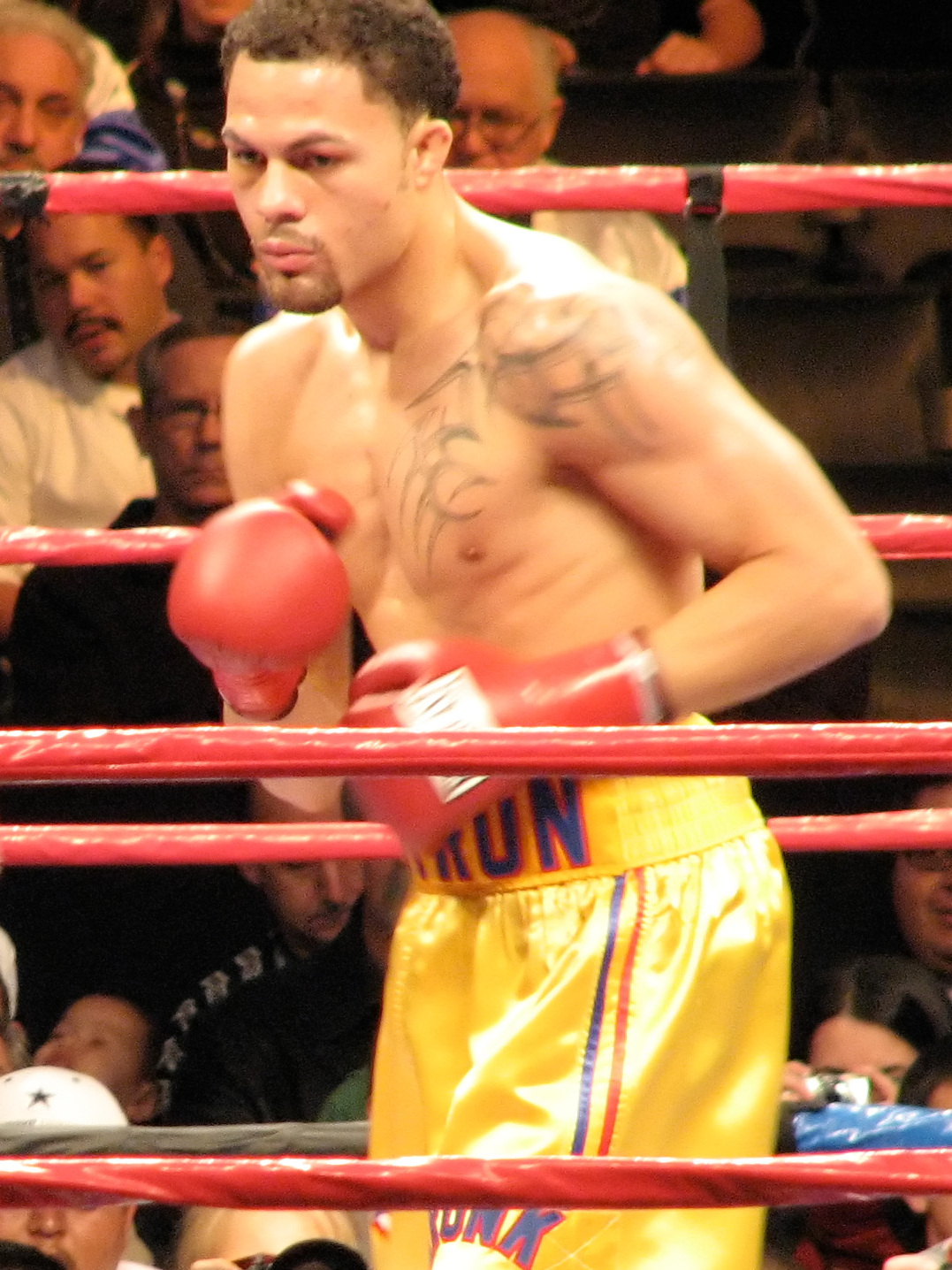
- Cintrón in his 2007 fight against Jesse Feliciano

Personal information
- Nicknames: The Killer; El Asesino ("The Assassin")
- Nationality: Puerto Rican
- Born: October 22, 1979 (age 46) Carolina, Puerto Rico
- Height: 5 ft 11 in (180 cm)
- Weight: Welterweight; Light middleweight

Boxing career
- Reach: 74 in (188 cm)
- Stance: Orthodox

Boxing record
- Total fights: 49
- Wins: 39
- Win by KO: 30
- Losses: 6
- Draws: 3
- No contests: 1

Kermit Cintrón (born October 22, 1979) is a Puerto Rican former professional boxer and online boxing writer. He held the IBF welterweight title from 2006 to 2008, and has challenged once for the WBC super welterweight title in 2011.

== Early and personal life ==
Cintrón had a difficult childhood. He witnessed his mother lie in bed for months before she died of cancer. Unable to care for Cintrón and his siblings, Cintrón's father sent him to the United States, with Cintrón's uncle, Benjamin Serrano, a former Middleweight contender who had fought Frank Fletcher. Cintrón's father remained in regular contact with his children but when Cintrón was 13 his father died of a heart attack, leaving him and his siblings orphaned.

As a child, Cintrón took up wrestling and boxing. While attending William Tennent High School in Warminster, Pennsylvania, he became an accomplished high-school wrestler on the same team as actor Mike Vogel. After competing at William Tennent, Cintron wrestled at Thaddeus Stevens College of Technology, a junior college in Lancaster, Pennsylvania.

In early 2008, Cintrón was trained by Emanuel Steward, who focused his training in boxing and counterattacks. He decided to finish this partnership, based on the fact that Steward's time was limited due to several other compromises. Despite this, both conserved a close friendship. During this timeframe, Cintrón abandoned Main Events, signing a promotional contract with Lou DiBella. His next trainer was Ronnie Shields, who emphasized on a faster training pace. Shields preferred a more aggressive style, reminiscent of the one presented during the early stage of Cintrón's early career. Brian Caldwell was employed as conditioning coach, in the process modifying his weight routines.

Cintrón is married to María Cintrón and the couple have three children. Two daughters, Denali and Savannah and a son, Clemente.

== Boxing career ==
=== Welterweight ===
Cintrón did not start boxing in the amateurs until he was 19. He compiled a record of 24 wins and 5 losses as an amateur.

On October 7, 2000, Cintrón knocked out Jesse Williams in two rounds in Lancaster to begin his professional career. Cintrón thus began an undefeated streak that would last for more than three-and-a-half years.

One of his toughest tests during that streak came against Omar Davila on February 16, 2002. Cintrón took the fight on one week's notice and traveled to his opponent's hometown of San Antonio. Despite being cut on the side of one of his eyes in the first round, Cintrón overcame adversity, coming back to defeat Davila by knockout in round two.

Cintrón was featured on NBC on May 18, 2003, against Puerto Rican veteran Luis Rosario, and he won by knockout 59 seconds into round one.

On July 17, 2004, Cintrón made his HBO Boxing debut, knocking out Teddy Reid in eight rounds.

KO Magazine featured Cintrón in an article, which compared his punching power to that of Félix Trinidad and Thomas Hearns.

Still undefeated and now considered a rising star in the division, Cintrón was scheduled for his first world title bout against WBO welterweight champion Antonio Margarito on April 23, 2005, as part of the undercard of a Shane Mosley win by unanimous decision against the Guatemalan-American boxer David Estrada. Cintrón was dropped by Margarito four times en route to a fifth-round knockout loss.

In early 2006, Cintrón rebounded with a tenth-round technical knockout of Estrada, thus reestablishing himself as a contender in the welterweight division.

==== IBF welterweight champion ====
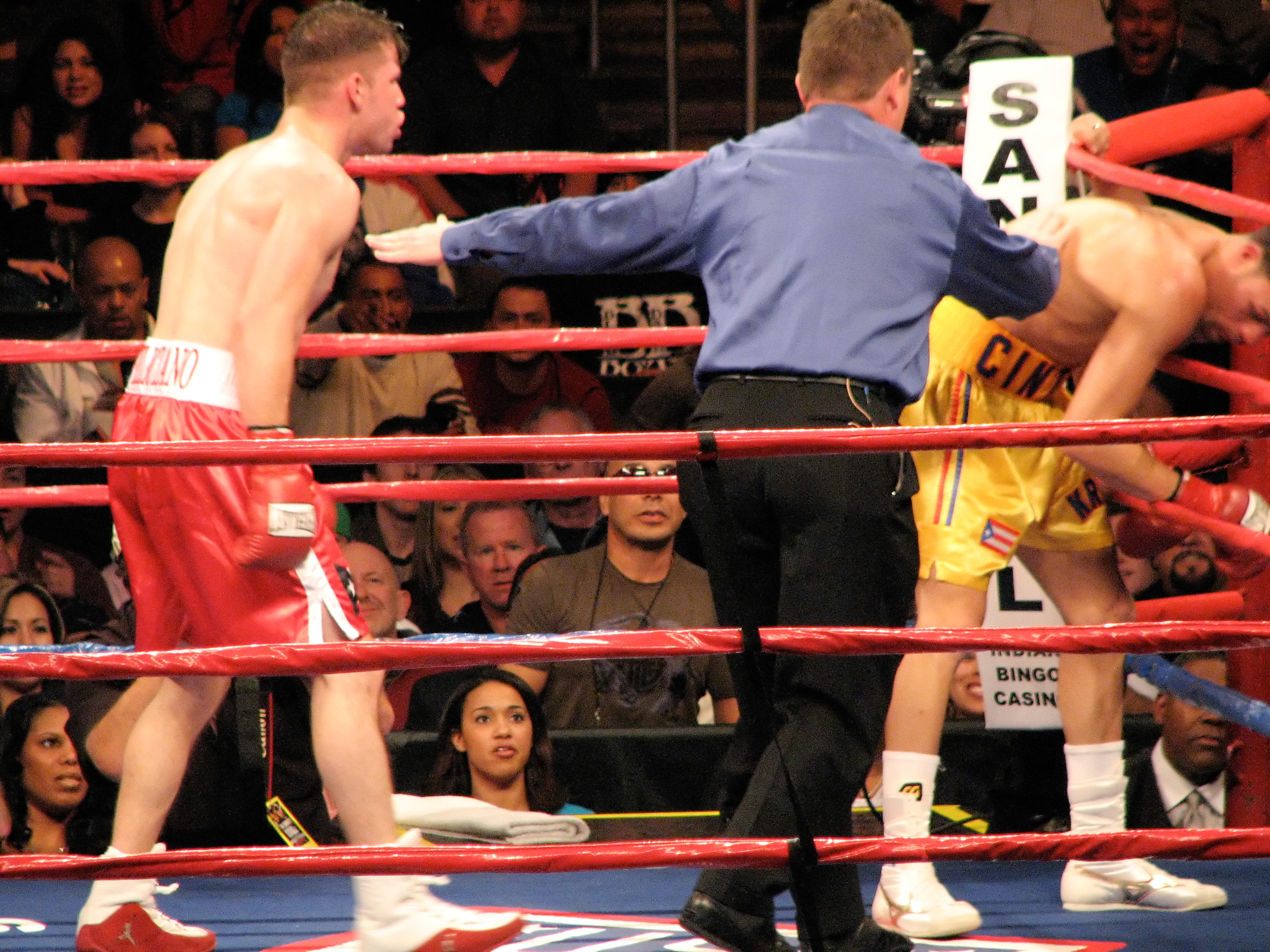
Cintrón in the corner in a 2007 fight against Jesse Feliciano

Cintrón then won his first title belt in a match against Mark Suarez for the IBF crown that had been vacated on June 20, 2006 by Floyd Mayweather Jr.

On July 14, 2007, Cintrón was dominant in his first title defense, knocking down Argentine Walter Matthysse three times on his way to a knockout victory twenty-nine seconds into the second round. Prior to this match, Matthysse had never been knocked down by any opponent, although he had suffered a tenth-round technical knockout in May 2006 at the hands of Paul Williams. (The Cintrón-Matthysse bout was the main undercard of a WBO title bout between challenger Williams and incumbent Margarito)

Cintrón and Williams were scheduled for an IBF/WBO title unification bout on February 2, 2008. But as a result of an injury to Cintrón's right hand sustained during his bout with Jesse Feliciano the fight has been canceled.

Cintrón lost his IBF title to Antonio Margarito by knockout on an April 12 broadcast of HBO's World Championship Boxing in a rematch from Atlantic City, NJ, on the undercard of Miguel Cotto vs. Alfonso Gómez. In the sixth round, Cintrón fell to the canvas after receiving a one-two punch to the head and a body shot and did not get up before the referee concluded the protective count. It was the first time he had lost a professional fight by a knockout (his previous loss to Margarito being scored as a technical knockout).

Cintrón returned to action against Lovemore N'dou, competing in an eliminatory fight sanctioned by the IBF. The fight took place on November 15, 2008, in a card held in Nashville, Tennessee. Early in the fight, Cintrón began on the offensive, while N'dou clinched regularly. This pattern slowed the fight's tempo throughout the contest. In the third round, Cintrón connected a solid punch, N'dou tried to counterattack and exchange but was ineffective, eventually returning to a strategy based on holds. The numerous clinches resulted in head butts, the referee issued numerous warnings to N'dou for these, eventually deducting a point in the ninth. In the tenth round, an accidental headbutt opened a laceration over Cintrón's eyebrow. In the eleventh round, he was able to injure N'dou with a punch, but did not continue pressing the offensive. Subsequently, the judges awarded Cintrón scores of 117-110, 115-112 and 116-111.

=== Light middleweight ===
Cintrón's victory over N'dou made him Joshua Clottey's mandatory challenger. The fight was discussed and preliminary agreements scheduled it for February 21, 2009. However, after receiving a more lucrative offer, Cintrón decided to fight Sergio Martínez for the World Boxing Council's interim light middleweight championship. The bout took place on February 14, 2009, and ended in a controversial majority draw. The opening rounds held no meaningful action, with Cintrón holding an early edge due to his aggression and cleaner punching. By the fourth round, Martínez started moving around with his hands down in an effort to draw Cintrón into a mistake, but to no avail, as there continued to be more clinching than punching. Martínez opened a cut over Cintrón's left eye early in the fifth round. Late in the seventh round, a left hand to the head hurt Cintrón, and after backing into the ropes, he went down to his knees before Martínez could attack. Cintrón claimed he was headbutted while the referee Frank Santore continued the count. After Cintrón's protests and a lot of confusion in the ring, Santore allowed the bout to continue, saying Cintrón was up at nine and that he never stopped the fight. Martínez went after Cintrón once the eighth round commenced and taunted him after landing punches to the head. Cintrón responded with sustained action of his own, but it was Martínez ending the round with another left hand to the head. The ninth round was favorable for Martínez, but Cintrón rebounded in the tenth round. Martínez lost a point for a punch to the back of the head in the final round. Scores were 116-110 for Martínez and 113-113 draw.

==== Cintrón vs. Angulo, Williams ====
On May 30, 2009 Cintron defeated Alfredo Angulo, who was unbeaten, by unanimous decision. This high-profile win put Cintrón into position to fight Paul Williams, at the time one of boxing's top fighters, pound for pound. This fight took place on May 8, 2010. Although Williams had averaged over a hundred punches per round in his previous outings, Cintrón was able to neutralize his punch output over the first three rounds by effectively jabbing and countering with his right hand. This resulted in a very technical three rounds of boxing and, not surprisingly, voluminous jeers from the spectating crowd. In the fourth round, however, the combatants began to exchange punches, each landing hard power punches on one another. One such exchange caused an entanglement between the fighters, sending Williams to the canvas and Cintrón through the ropes, where he landed on a media table abutting the exterior of the ring. He then fell to the floor and was immediately attended to by ringside doctors. Boxing rules dictate that a fighter, in these circumstances, is afforded a five-minute period with which to recover; however, given that Cintrón was advised by doctors not to move, the fight was called and Cintrón was removed from the arena bound to a stretcher. Since three rounds had been completed, the fight became official and Williams was declared the winner by split decision.

On July 9, 2010, Cintrón lost a unanimous decision to Carlos Molina, who had an 18-4-2 record going into the fight.

On August 12, 2011, Cintrón won a unanimous decision over Antwone Smith.

==== Cintrón vs. Álvarez ====
On November 26, 2011, Cintrón was knocked out in five rounds by Canelo Álvarez.

== Mixed martial arts career ==
=== Public challenge to Sean Sherk ===
In April 2007, Floyd Mayweather Jr. publicly claimed that any boxer could make the transition into mixed martial arts and win. In response, Ultimate Fighting Championship's president, Dana White, issued him a challenge to fight the promotion's lightweight champion, Sean Sherk. Mayweather later said that he did not wish to compete in the discipline. However, Cintrón stated that he was willing to fight Sherk in his place. "I want the fight," said Cintrón, who was 27-1 with 25 KOs. "I can wrestle. I can box. I can beat those UFC fighters at their own game. Tell Mr. White to make me an offer and I'll take on his guy...."

=== Lingering interest ===
Seven years later, Mike Sloan of Sherdog argued that "If Cintron [sic] would have had the opportunity to compete in MMA when he first got into boxing, he would have torn most of the lower weight divisions asunder" and "would have been a top contender in MMA." Sloan argued that his wrestling background and "ferocious banging style" represented "a dynamic combination that would have given MMA contenders all sorts of trouble" had he completed the transition in his prime.

In June 2017, Cintrón once again commented on his interest noting that he " would have loved to get into mixed martial arts. At that time I was rising in the sport of boxing, but I would have crossed to MMA if the opportunity had come. I didn't know anyone in that sport so I never proceeded with it. Never looked into it as I should have, I guess. I think I would have done great." He noted that he "would if UFC called". Later that year, Cintrón expressed interest in accepting Conor McGregor's challenge for boxers to "come into his world" and step into the UFC octagon.

=== Formal transition ===
In November 2019, Cintrón announced that upon retiring from boxing, he would try his hand at MMA, still feeling confident that his background in amateur wrestling would facilitate the transition. When queried why it took so long, he responded "[o]ne time, the name Sean Sherk came up, and I was all about it! And that kind of died out so I continued with my boxing career. I've tried! I've tried over the years to get connected to Dana White and see if I can get an opportunity but it never came about. Hopefully this happens this time around!" For this, he added 20 pounds to his frame, given the disparity of the welterweight division between sports. Cintrón also retook his wrestling training, working with an NCAA Division-1 wrestler and a former UFC fighter.

== Professional boxing record ==
49 fights	39 wins	6 losses
By knockout	30	4
By decision	9	2
Draws	3	
No contests	1	

No.	Result	Record	Opponent	Type	Round, time	Date	Location	Notes
49	NC	39–6–3 (1)	Marquis Taylor	NC	3 (8), 0:35	Feb 13, 2018	Sands Event Center, Bethlehem, Pennsylvania, U.S.	NC after Cintrón was cut from an accidental head clash
48	Loss	39–6–3	Tyrone Brunson	TKO	5 (10), 1:21	Jun 24, 2017	2300 Arena, Philadelphia, Pennsylvania, U.S.	For vacant Pennsylvania super welterweight title
47	Draw	39–5–3	David Grayton	TD	5 (10), 2:53	Mar 17, 2017	Santander Arena, Reading, Pennsylvania, U.S.	Majority TD after Cintrón could not continue from an accidental head clash
46	Win	39–5–2	Rosemberg Gomez	RTD	3 (8), 3:00	Dec 10, 2016	Sands Event Center, Bethlehem, Pennsylvania, U.S.	
45	Win	38–5–2	Manny Woods	TKO	7 (8), 2:28	Sep 9, 2016	Santander Arena, Reading, Pennsylvania, U.S.	Won vacant WBF (Foundation) United States super welterweight title
44	Win	37–5–2	Carlos Garcia	UD	8	Jul 2, 2016	Santander Arena, Reading, Pennsylvania, U.S.	
43	Win	36–5–2	Eduardo Flores	UD	6	May 6, 2016	2300 Arena, Philadelphia, Pennsylvania, U.S.	
42	Win	35–5–2	Ronald Cruz	UD	10	Mar 15, 2014	Sands Event Center, Bethlehem, Pennsylvania, U.S.	
41	Win	34–5–2	Jonathan Batista	UD	10	Aug 2, 2013	Buffalo Run Casino, Miami, Oklahoma, U.S.	
40	Draw	33–5–2	Adrían Granados	SD	10	Mar 22, 2013	UIC Pavilion, Chicago, Illinois, U.S.	
39	Loss	33–5–1	Canelo Álvarez	TKO	5 (12), 2:53	Nov 26, 2011	Plaza de Toros, Mexico City, Mexico	For WBC super welterweight title
38	Win	33–4–1	Antwone Smith	UD	10	Aug 12, 2011	Family Arena, St. Charles, Missouri, U.S.	
37	Loss	32–4–1	Carlos Molina	UD	10	Jul 9, 2011	Home Depot Center, Carson, California, U.S.	
36	Loss	32–3–1	Paul Williams	TD	4 (12), 3:00	May 8, 2010	Home Depot Center, Carson, California, U.S.	Split TD after Cintrón could not continue from falling out of the ring
35	Win	32–2–1	Juliano Ramos	RTD	5 (10), 0:10	Oct 24, 2009	Roberto Clemente Coliseum, San Juan, Puerto Rico	
34	Win	31–2–1	Alfredo Angulo	UD	12	May 30, 2009	Hard Rock Live, Hollywood, Florida, U.S.	
33	Draw	30–2–1	Sergio Martínez	MD	12	Feb 14, 2009	BankAtlantic Center, Sunrise, Florida, U.S.	For WBC interim super welterweight title
32	Win	30–2	Lovemore N'dou	UD	12	Nov 15, 2008	Memorial Gymnasium, Nashville, Tennessee, U.S.	
31	Loss	29–2	Antonio Margarito	KO	6 (12), 1:57	Apr 12, 2008	Boardwalk Hall, Atlantic City, New Jersey, U.S.	Lost IBF welterweight title
30	Win	29–1	Jesse Feliciano	TKO	10 (12), 1:53	Nov 23, 2007	Staples Center, Los Angeles, California, U.S.	Retained IBF welterweight title
29	Win	28–1	Walter Matthysse	KO	2 (12), 0:29	Jul 14, 2007	Boardwalk Hall, Atlantic City, New Jersey, U.S.	Retained IBF welterweight title
28	Win	27–1	Mark Suárez	TKO	5 (12), 2:31	Oct 28, 2006	Convention Center, Palm Beach, Florida, U.S.	Won vacant IBF welterweight title
27	Win	26–1	David Estrada	TKO	10 (12), 1:13	Apr 19, 2006	Convention Center, Palm Beach, Florida, U.S.	
26	Win	25–1	Francisco Javier Parra	TKO	3 (8), 2:07	Sep 29, 2005	Michael's Eighth Avenue, Glen Burnie, Maryland, U.S.	
25	Loss	24–1	Antonio Margarito	TKO	5 (12), 2:12	Apr 23, 2005	Caesars Palace, Paradise, Nevada, U.S.	For WBO welterweight title
24	Win	24–0	Teddy Reid	TKO	8 (12), 0:56	Jul 17, 2004	Reliant Center, Houston, Texas, U.S.	Won WBC–NABF and vacant WBO interim welterweight titles
23	Win	23–0	Elio Ortiz	TKO	6 (10), 1:15	May 1, 2004	Bally's, Atlantic City, New Jersey, U.S.	
22	Win	22–0	Humberto Aranda	TKO	5 (10), 1:05	Jan 24, 2004	Boardwalk Hall, Atlantic City, New Jersey, U.S.	
21	Win	21–0	Hicklet Lau	TKO	9 (10), 0:45	Dec 12, 2003	Casino Del Sol, Tucson, Arizona, U.S.	
20	Win	20–0	Jesus Felipe Valverde	UD	10	Aug 29, 2003	Sovereign Center, Reading, Pennsylvania, U.S.	
19	Win	19–0	Luis Rosado	TKO	1 (8), 2:27	May 17, 2003	Etess Arena, Atlantic City, New Jersey, U.S.	
18	Win	18–0	Frankie Sanchez	TKO	6 (10)	Feb 14, 2003	Comfort Hall, Reading, Pennsylvania, U.S.	
17	Win	17–0	Ian MacKillop	TKO	2 (10), 1:29	Aug 24, 2002	Bally's, Atlantic City, New Jersey, U.S.	
16	Win	16–0	Otilio Villarreal	TKO	2 (8), 2:29	Jul 19, 2002	Riveredge Hotel, Reading, Pennsylvania, U.S.	
15	Win	15–0	Patrick Thorns	TKO	4 (10), 1:09	May 10, 2002	County Coliseum, El Paso, Texas, U.S.	
14	Win	14–0	Alex Perez	TKO	2 (8), 2:02	Mar 15, 2002	Fernwood Resort, Bushkill, Pennsylvania, U.S.	
13	Win	13–0	Omar Davila	TKO	2 (10), 2:13	Feb 16, 2002	Sunset Station, San Antonio, Texas, U.S.	Won WBC Youth interim welterweight title
12	Win	12–0	Andre Baker	KO	4	Sep 25, 2001	Abraham Lincoln Hotel, Reading, Pennsylvania, U.S.	
11	Win	11–0	Said Ouali	TKO	5 (8), 1:50	Aug 18, 2001	Mohegan Sun Arena, Montville, Connecticut, U.S.	
10	Win	10–0	Leon Pearson	PTS	6	May 31, 2001	Zembo Shrine Building, Harrisburg, Pennsylvania, U.S.	
9	Win	9–0	Leroy Brown	TKO	2	Apr 28, 2001	Pottstown, Pennsylvania, U.S.	
8	Win	8–0	Genaro Andujar	KO	1	Mar 29, 2001	National Guard Armory, Philadelphia, Pennsylvania, U.S.	
7	Win	7–0	Kareem Whitehurst	TKO	1	Mar 15, 2001	Days Inn, Allentown, Pennsylvania, U.S.	
6	Win	6–0	George Turner	TKO	1	Feb 9, 2001	Reading, Pennsylvania, U.S.	
5	Win	5–0	Vernon Meeks	TKO	1	Jan 19, 2001	Norfolk, Virginia, U.S.	
4	Win	4–0	Willis Silver	TKO	1	Jan 12, 2001	The Blue Horizon, Philadelphia, Pennsylvania, U.S.	
3	Win	3–0	Danny Rodriguez	TKO	4 (4)	Nov 21, 2000	Genetti Manor, Dickson City, Pennsylvania, U.S.	
2	Win	2–0	Lawrence Brooks	KO	1	Oct 19, 2000	Zembo Shrine Building, Harrisburg, Pennsylvania, U.S.	
1	Win	1–0	Jesse Williams	TKO	2 (4)	Oct 7, 2000	Lancaster, Pennsylvania, U.S.	

== See also ==
- List of welterweight boxing champions
- List of IBF world champions
- List of Puerto Rican boxing world champions

Sporting positions
Regional boxing titles
New title	WBC Youth interim welterweight champion February 16, 2002 – July 2002; Vacated	Vacant Title next held by Ed Paredes
Preceded by Teddy Reid	NABF welterweight champion July 17, 2004 – April 2005; Vacated	Vacant Title next held by Steve Martinez
New title	WBF (Foundation) United States light middleweight champion September 9, 2016 – present	Incumbent
World boxing titles
Vacant Title last held by Manning Galloway	WBO welterweight champion Interim title July 17, 2004 – April 23, 2005; Lost bid for full title	Vacant Title next held by Timothy Bradley
Vacant Title last held by Floyd Mayweather Jr.	IBF welterweight champion October 28, 2006 – April 12, 2008	Succeeded by Antonio Margarito
