= Matthysse =

Matthysse is a surname. Notable people with the surname include:

- Edith Soledad Matthysse (born 1980), Argentine boxer
- Lucas Matthysse (born 1982), Argentine boxer, brother of Edith and Walter
- Walter Matthysse (born 1978), Argentine boxer
