= Dean Byrne (boxer) =

Irish boxer (born 1984)

Personal information
- Nickname: "Irish Lightning"
- Nationality: Irish
- Born: Dean Byrne; 11 September 1984 Crumlin, Dublin, Ireland
- Weight: Light welterweight

Boxing career
- Stance: Orthodox

Boxing record
- Total fights: 26
- Wins: 18
- Win by KO: 6
- Losses: 6
- Draws: 2
- No contests: 0

Dean Byrne (11 September 1984) is an Irish professional boxer who fought in the light welterweight class.

== Amateur career ==
Byrne, nicknamed "Irish Lightning", had vast experience boxing as an amateur fighting out of Crumlin ABC and during his 200 amateur fights he became Irish national intermediate light welterweight champion also represented Ireland at international level.

== Professional career ==
Following the Irish senior championships, Byrne then emigrated to Australia where he then turned professional and had his first pro fight in February 2006.

Dean's unbeaten streak lasted until 28 October 2011. When, just 8 days after winning a Unanimous decision over Michael Frontin, Byrne took a major step up in class facing France's IBF International Light-Middleweight Champion, Frank Haroche Horta (then 26–8). An unprepared Byrne was outboxed up until the 8th round when his corner retired him due to an injury to his right hand.

Exactly six months later, Byrne fought the then 5–0 unbeaten Terry Holmes of England, and lost a narrow points decision over 8 rounds. Byrne had a comeback fight against Kevin McAuley winning a points decision over four rounds.

On 8 December 2012, Byrne stepped in on a week's notice as a late replacement to fight American contender Carson Jones after Lee Purdy pulled out of the fight due to having caught a virus. Byrne was supposed to be an easy win for Jones who was just recently coming off a majority decision loss to Britain's hard-punching golden boy Kell Brook, but Byrne managed to battle Jones to a draw.

== Professional boxing record ==
18 Wins (6 KOs), 6 Loss, 2 Draw
Res.	Record	Opponent	Type	Round	Date	Location	Notes
Win	18–6–1	(United Kingdom) Jamie Robinson	PTS	6	2016-03-26	(United Kingdom) Sheffield Arena, Sheffield	
Loss	17–6–1	(Republic of Ireland) Peter McDonagh	PTS	10	2015-11-07	(Republic of Ireland) National Stadium, Dublin	For vacant BUI Ireland National Welterweight Title
Loss	17–5–1	(Russia) David Avanesyan	TKO	6 (8), 0:41	2015-06-27	(United Kingdom) Hilton Hotel, Blackpool	
Draw	17–4–1	(United Kingdom) William Warburton	PTS	4	2015-05-16	(United Kingdom) York Hall, Bethnal Green, London	
Loss	17–4	(United Kingdom) Mark Douglas	UD	3	2014-04-05	(United Kingdom) York Hall, Bethnal Green, London	Prizefighter Tournament, Welterweight Quarter Final.
Loss	17–3	(Russia) Roman Belaev	UD	12	2014-02-01	Salle des Étoiles, Monte Carlo, Monaco	Vacant WBA Continental Welterweight Title on the line.
Win	17–2	(United Kingdom) Danny Little	PTS	6	2013-07-05	(United Kingdom) Camden Centre, Kings Cross, London	Little down in round 3
Draw	16–2	(United States) Carson Jones	PTS	8	2012-12-08	(United Kingdom) Olympia, Kensington, London	
Win	16–2	(United Kingdom) Kevin McCauley	PTS	4	2012-09-15	(United Kingdom) York Hall, Bethnal Green, London	
Loss	15–2	(United Kingdom) Terry Holmes	PTS	8	2012-04-28	(United Kingdom) Royal Albert Hall, Kensington, London	
Loss	15–1	(France) Frank Haroche Horta	RTD	8 (12), 3:00	2011-10-28	(United Kingdom) Bowlers Exhibition Centre, Manchester	Byrne fighting as a late replacement 7 days after his previous fight, byrne retires on right hand injury
Win	15–0	(Mauritius) Michael Frontin	PTS	8	2011-10-21	(United Kingdom) York Hall, Bethnal Green, London	
Win	14–0	(Latvia) Sergejs Volodins	PTS	6	2010-12-10	(Republic of Ireland) National Basketball Arena, Tallaght, Dublin, Ireland	
Win	13–0	(Latvia) Konstantis Sakara	TKO	4 (6), 0:40	2010-08-07	(Republic of Ireland) City West Hotel, Dublin, Ireland	
Win	12–0	(United States) Justo Sanchez	TKO	5 (6), 2:18	2010-05-15	(United States) Chumash casino, California	
Win	11–0	(Mexico) Jose reynoso	UD	8	2009-05-01	(United States) South Point Hotel Casino, Las Vegas, Nevada	
Win	10–0	(Mexico) Francisco Rios Gil	TKO	4 (6), 1:14	2008-12-20	(United States) Inglewood, California	
Win	9–0	(United States) Geoffrey Spruiell	KO	2 (6), 0:19	2008-09-19	(United States) Woodland Hills, California	
Win	8–0	(United States) Daniel Gonzales	UD	6	2008-08-02	(United States) Emerald Queen casino, Tacoma, Washington	
Win	7–0	(United States) Michaelangelo Lynks	TKO	1 (6), 1:15	2008-05-23	(United States) Quiet Cannon, Montebello, California	
Win	6–0	(Australia) Brad Crookey	UD	10	2007-05-27	(Australia) Inglis Auctions Complex, Sydney	Defended Australian Light-Welterweight Title
Win	5–0	(Australia) Chris McCullen	UD	10	2007-03-10	Chandler Arena, Queensland, Australia	Won Australian Light-Welterweight Title
Win	4–0	(Philippines) Arnel Porras	TD	5 (8)	2006-10-21	Roundhouse, New South Wales, Australia	Won New South Wales State Light-Welterweight Title
Win	3–0	(Australia) Roberto Oyan	UD	6	2006-08-04	(Australia) Croatian Club, Sydney	
Win	2–0	(Australia) Roberto Oyan	UD	6	2006-05-12	(Australia) Croatian Club, Punchbowl, Sydney	
Win	1–0	(Philippines) Ronnie Oyan	TKO	2 (6), 2:28	2006-02-18	Windsor Rugby league Club, South Windsor, New South Wales, Australia	Professional debut
