= Sebastián Luján =

Argentine boxer

Personal information
- Nicknames: Iron; Pimienta ("Pepper")
- Born: Sebastián Andrés Luján; December 14, 1979 (age 46) Rosario, Santa Fe, Argentina
- Weight: Welterweight; Light middleweight Middleweight

Boxing career
- Stance: Orthodox

Boxing record
- Total fights: 59
- Wins: 43
- Win by KO: 26
- Losses: 13
- Draws: 2
- No contests: 1

Sebastián Andrés Lujan (born December 14, 1979) is an Argentine professional boxer and three-time world title challenger.

== Pro career ==
In June 2003, Sebastián Andrés won the WBO Latino Welterweight Championship by beating fellow Argentinian Carlos Adan Jerez, at the time Jerez had a record of 14-1.

=== WBO Welterweight Championship ===
On February 18, 2005 Lujan lost to the WBO Welterweight Champion American Antonio Margarito on ESPN.

=== WBO Light Middleweight Championship ===
His next title fight ended in a disputed decision loss to the WBO Light Middleweight Champion Sergiy Dzindziruk in Die Kulturhalle, Munich, Bayern, Germany.

On December 3, 2011, Jones defeated Sebastian Andres Lujan by unanimous decision in an IBF Welterweight Title Eliminator. The fight took place at Madison Square Garden on the under card of Miguel Cotto vs Antonio Margarito II.

== Outside boxing ==
His victory over Paolo Roberto is referenced in Stieg Larsson's book The Girl Who Played with Fire. In the book, Roberto gets beaten down by an unusual hulk and during the fight he reminds Lujàn match.

== Professional record ==
43 Wins (26 Knockouts), 13 Defeats, 2 Draws, 1 No Contest
Res.	Record	Opponent	Type	Rd., Time	Date	Location	Notes
Loss	43-13-2 (1)	(Argentina) Pablo Ezequiel Corzo	TKO	5 (6)	2021-11-06	(Argentina) Club Atletico Villa San Carlos, Berisso	
Loss	43-12-2 (1)	(Argentina) Marcelo Cóceres	UD	10 (10)	2016-01-22	Club Atlético Argentino, Firmat, Santa Fe, Argentina	
Loss	43-11-2 (1)	(Argentina) Jose Antonio Villalobos	SD	6 (6)	2015-12-19	Salón Múltiple de la Sociedad Española, Villada, Santa Fe, Argentina	
Loss	43-10-2 (1)	(Argentina) Hector Saldivia	KO	2 (10)	2015-04-10	Club 9 de Julio, Lanús Oeste, Buenos Aires, Argentina	
Loss	43-9-2 (1)	(Argentina) Hector Saldivia	UD	10 (10)	2015-02-18	Estadio Socios Fundadores, Comodoro Rivadavia, Chubut, Argentina	
Win	43-8-2 (1)	(Argentina) Amilcar Edgardo Funes Melian	UD	10 (10)	2014-10-03	Estadio F.A.B., Buenos Aires, Distrito Federal, Argentina	
Loss	42-8-2 (1)	(Argentina) Víctor Hugo Velázquez	UD	10 (10)	2014-03-28	Club Atlético Central Argentino, Río Cuarto, Córdoba, Argentina	
Win	42-7-2 (1)	(Argentina) Carlos Saul Chumbita	TKO	2 (10)	2013-11-08	Estadio Pedro Estremador, Bariloche, Río Negro, Argentina	interim Argentina (FAB) welterweight title
Win	41-7-2 (1)	(Argentina) Víctor Hugo Velázquez	UD	10 (10)	2013-06-21	Catamarca, Catamarca, Argentina	interim Argentina (FAB) welterweight title
Win	40-7-2 (1)	(Argentina) Oscar Fabian Pérez	TKO	4 (6)	2013-04-07	C. A. Social Intercambio Evaristo Carriego, Santa Fe, Argentina	
Loss	39-7-2 (1)	(South Africa) Chris van Heerden	UD	12 (12)	2012-06-16	Emperor's Palace, Kempton Park, Gauteng, South Africa	For IBF welterweight title
Win	37-6-2 (1)	(Argentina) Jose Maria Pombo	UD	12 (12)	2012-04-20	Centro Cosmopolita Unión y Progreso, Roldán, Santa Fe, Argentina	
Loss	36-6-2 (1)	(United States) Mike Jones	UD	12 (12)	2011-12-03	(United States) Madison Square Garden, New York, New York	
Win	36-5-2 (1)	(Philippines) Mark Jason Melligen	KO	9 (10)	2011-07-01	(United States) Freeman Coliseum, San Antonio, Texas, USA	
Win	35-5-2 (1)	(Argentina) Jorge Daniel Miranda	UD	12 (12)	2011-05-13	Club Estudiantes, Rio Cuarto, Cordoba, Argentina	WBC Latino welterweight title.
Win	34-5-2 (1)	(Argentina) Juan Pablo Lucero	TKO	4 (10)	2011-03-11	Club Atletico Echagüe, Parana, Entre Rios, Argentina	WBC Latino welterweight title
Win	33-5-2 (1)	(Argentina) Juan Jose Dias	UD	10 (10)	2010-10-15	Polideportivo Unidad Turística, Embalse Río Tercero, Cordoba, Argentina	
Win	32-5-2 (1)	(Colombia) Emilio Julio Julio	RTD	7 (10)	2010-08-27	Club Atletico Newell's Old Boys, Rosario, Santa Fe, Argentina	
Win	31-5-2 (1)	(Colombia) Jailer Berrio	KO	5 (10)	2010-05-28	Estadio U.T.N., Santa Fe, Santa Fe, Argentina	
Win	30-5-2 (1)	(Argentina) Ignacio Lucero Fraga	UD	6 (6)	2009-11-21	Buenos Aires Lawn Tennis Club, Buenos Aires, Distrito Federal, Argentina	Won vacant WBC Latino welterweight title
Win	29-5-2 (1)	(Venezuela) Charlie Navarro	MD	12 (12)	2009-03-21	Club Atletico Newell's Old Boys, Rosario, Santa Fe, Argentina	
Win	28-5-2 (1)	(Mexico) Jose Luis Castillo	UD	10 (10)	2008-07-30	(United States) Sycuan Resort & Casino, El Cajon, California, USA	
Win	27-5-2 (1)	(Argentina) Juan Mauricio Marino	UD	10 (10)	2008-04-11	Club Sportivo America, Rosario, Santa Fe, Argentina	
Win	26-5-2 (1)	(Argentina) Walter Matthysse	KO	5 (10)	2007-10-19	Club Atletico Newell's Old Boys, Rosario, Santa Fe, Argentina	
Win	25-5-2 (1)	(Paraguay) Arnaldo Nery Benitez Rios	RTD	10 (10)	2007-08-24	Club Sportivo America, Rosario, Santa Fe, Argentina	
Loss	24-5-2 (1)	(United Kingdom) Jamie Moore	PTS	12 (12)	2007-04-13	Leisure Centre, Altrincham, Greater Manchester, United Kingdom	
Win	24-4-2 (1)	(Argentina) Roberto Hernan Reuque	TKO	9 (10)	2006-10-28	Club Sportivo America, Rosario, Santa Fe, Argentina	Won vacant WBA Fedelatin welterweight title
Loss	23-4-2 (1)	(Ukraine) Serhiy Dzinziruk	UD	12 (12)	2006-05-27	Zenith - Die Kulturhalle, Munich, Bayern, Germany	For WBO light middleweight title
Win	23-3-2 (1)	(Argentina) Miguel Angel Morales	KO	1 (6)	2006-02-23	Palacio Peñarol, Montevideo, Uruguay	
Loss	22-3-2 (1)	(Argentina) Marco Antonio Avendano	KO	2 (12)	2005-12-17	Club El Ciclon, Rosario, Santa Fe, Argentina	For vacant WBA Fedelatin welterweight title
Win	22-2-2 (1)	(Argentina) Ariel Gabriel Chaves	RTD	3 (10)	2005-10-22	Club Atletico Newell's Old Boys, Rosario, Santa Fe, Argentina	
Draw	21-2-2 (1)	(Hungary) Mihaly Kotai	PTS	12 (12)	2005-09-23	George Carnall Leisure Centre, Manchester, United Kingdom	For IBO light middleweight title
Win	21-2-1 (1)	(Argentina) Marcelo Alejandro Rodriguez	TKO	5 (10)	2005-08-19	Club Sportivo America, Rosario, Santa Fe, Argentina	
Loss	20-2-1 (1)	(United States) Antonio Margarito	TKO	10 (12)	2005-02-18	(United States) Boardwalk Hall, Atlantic City, New Jersey, USA	For WBO welterweight title
Win	20-1-1 (1)	(Argentina) Cesar Alberto Leiva	TKO	1 (10)	2004-11-20	Estadio F.A.B., Buenos Aires, Distrito Federal, Argentina	
Win	19-1-1 (1)	(Argentina) Sergio Gaston Finetto	UD	10 (10)	2004-09-25	Estadio F.A.B., Buenos Aires, Distrito Federal, Argentina	
NC	18-1-1 (1)	(Argentina) Alejandro Jesus Benitez	NC	2 (10)	2004-07-24	Club Sportivo America, Rosario, Santa Fe, Argentina	
Win	18-1-1	(Argentina) Ariel Gerardo Aparicio	KO	1 (10)	2004-06-12	Club de Regatas, Corrientes, Corrientes, Argentina	
Win	17-1-1	(Argentina) Ariel Sebastian Oscar Villalba	TKO	1 (8)	2004-05-26	Luna Park, Buenos Aires, Distrito Federal, Argentina	
Win	16-1-1	(Argentina) Sergio Ernesto Acuna	TKO	1 (10)	2004-03-27	Estadio F.A.B., Buenos Aires, Distrito Federal, Argentina	
Win	15-1-1	(Argentina) Ruben Dario Oliva	KO	1 (8)	2004-02-07	Club Atletico Mar del Plata, Mar del Plata, Buenos Aires, Argentina	
Win	14-1-1	(Argentina) Alejandro Jesus Benitez	UD	10 (10)	2003-12-12	Club Newell's Old Boys, Rosario, Santa Fe, Argentina	
Win	13-1-1	(Argentina) Marcos Carlos Alegre	TKO	3 (8)	2003-11-14	Club Newell's Old Boys, Rosario, Santa Fe, Argentina	
Win	12-1-1	(Sweden) Paolo Roberto	KO	2 (10)	2003-10-04	Baltic Hall, Mariehamn, Finland	
Win	11-1-1	(Argentina) Javier Alejandro Blanco	TKO	3 (8)	2003-07-26	Club Newell's Old Boys, Rosario, Santa Fe, Argentina	
Win	10-1-1	(Argentina) Carlos Adan Jerez	KO	7 (12)	2003-06-14	(Argentina) Estadio Republica de Venezuela, Bolívar, Buenos Aires	
