= Giovanni Lorenzo (boxer) =

Dominican boxer

Personal information
- Nationality: Dominican
- Born: 13 October 1980 (age 45) San Cristobal, Dominican Republic
- Height: 183 cm (6 ft 0 in)

Boxing career
- Reach: 1.91 cm (1 in)
- Stance: Orthodox

Boxing record
- Total fights: 45
- Wins: 37
- Win by KO: 28
- Losses: 8

Giovanni Lorenzo (born 13 October 1980) is a Dominican professional boxer who turned pro in 2002.

== Professional boxing record ==
Result	Record	Opponent	Type	Date	Location	Notes
45	37-8	(United States) Devaun Lee	TKO	9 Sep 2017	(United States) Resorts World Casino, Queens, USA	
44	37-7	(Venezuela) Rafael May	UD	16 Jul 2016	Club el Millon, Santo Domingo, Dominican Republic	
43	36-7	(Dominican Republic) Alexis Castillo	TKO	17 Apr 2016	Club Paprodeva, Villa Altagracia, Dominican Republic	
42	35-7	(Dominican Republic) Modesto Felix	KO	9 Apr 2016	Club Maquiteria, Santo Domingo, Dominican Republic	
41	34-7	(Dominican Republic) Jose Antonio Rodriguez	RTD	22 Oct 2015	Casa de los Clubes, Santo Domingo, Dominican Republic	
40	33-7	(Mexico) Gilberto Ramirez	TKO	11 Apr 2014	(United States) Mandalay Bay Resort & Casino, Las Vegas, Nevada, USA	For vacant NABF and WBO NABO super middleweight titles
39	33-6	(Dominican Republic) Robinson Pena	RTD	10 Mar 2014	Polideportvo Eleoncio Mercedes, La Romana, Dominican Republic	
38	32-6	(United States) Daniel Jacobs	TKO	19 Aug 2013	(United States) Best Buy Theater, New York, New York, USA	For vacant WBC Continental Americas middleweight title
37	32-5	(United States) Johnny Valentin	KO	9 Mar 2013	Coliseo Carlos 'Teo' Cruz, Santo Domingo, Dominican Republic	
36	31-5	(Australia) Sam Soliman	UD	24 Aug 2012	The Arena, Geelong, Victoria, Australia	
35	31-4	(United States) Jeremy Yelton	TKO	1 Oct 2011	(United States) Coliseum, Greensboro, North Carolina, USA	
34	30-4	(Colombia) Jaison Palomeque	TKO	30 May 2011	Coliseo Carlos 'Teo' Cruz, Santo Domingo, Dominican Republic	
33	29-4	(Cameroon) Hassan N'Dam N'Jikam	UD	2 Apr 2011	La Palestre, Le Cannet, Alpes-Maritimes, France	For interim WBA World middleweight title
32	29-3	(Germany) Felix Sturm	UD	4 Sep 2010	Lanxess-Arena, Cologne, Nordrhein-Westfalen, Germany	For WBA Super World middleweight title
31	29-2	(United States) Daryl Salmon	KO	3 Jun 2010	(United States) Commerce Casino, Commerce, California, USA	
30	28-2	(Nicaragua) Wilmer Gonzalez	KO	12 Mar 2010	Sosua Bay Grand Casino, Puerto Plata, Dominican Republic	
29	27-2	(Germany) Sebastian Sylvester	SD	19 Sep 2009	Jahnsportforum, Neubrandenburg, Mecklenburg-Vorpommern, Germany	For vacant IBF middleweight title
28	27-1	(Colombia) Dionisio Miranda	KO	27 Feb 2009	(United States) Prudential Center, Newark, New Jersey, USA	
27	26-1	(United States) Raúl Márquez	UD	21 Jun 2008	(United States) Seminole Hard Rock Hotel and Casino, Hollywood, Florida, USA	
26	26-0	(Mexico) Ulises Duarte	KO	17 Dec 2007	Coliseo Carlos 'Teo' Cruz, Santo Domingo, Dominican Republic	
25	25-0	(United States) Sherwin Davis	TKO	14 Jul 2007	(United States) Boardwalk Hall, Atlantic City, New Jersey, USA	
24	24-0	(United States) Bruce Rumbolz	TKO	2 Jun 2007	(United States) Boardwalk Hall, Atlantic City, New Jersey, USA	
23	23-0	(Uganda) Robert Kamya	TKO	16 Mar 2007	(United States) Madison Square Garden, New York, New York, USA	
22	22-0	(Costa Rica) Jordan Sanchez	TKO	18 Dec 2006	Palacio Virgilio Travieso Soto, Santo Domingo, Dominican Republic	
21	21-0	(Canada) Bryon Mackie	TKO	22 Jul 2006	(United States) Boardwalk Hall, Atlantic City, New Jersey, USA	
20	20-0	(Armenia) Archak Termeliksetian	RTD	10 Mar 2006	(United States) Schuetzen Park, North Bergen, New Jersey, USA	
19	19-0	(Saint Lucia) Christopher Henry	TKO	16 Feb 2006	(United States) Grand Ballroom, New York, New York, USA	
18	18-0	(United States) Ronald Weaver	UD	25 Jun 2005	(United States) Boardwalk Hall, Atlantic City, New Jersey, USA	
17	17-0	(Dominican Republic) Rafael De la Cruz	TKO	2 Apr 2005	Coliseo Poli Deportivo, San Cristobal, Dominican Republic	Won Dominican Republic middleweight title
16	16-0	(United States) Dennis Sharpe	TKO	29 Jan 2005	(United States) Boardwalk Hall, Atlantic City, New Jersey, USA	
15	15-0	(United States) Clarence Taylor	TKO	3 Dec 2004	(United States) Ballys Park Place Hotel Casino, Atlantic City, New Jersey, USA	
14	14-0	(United States) Larry Brothers	TKO	1 Oct 2004	(United States) Riveredge Hotel, Reading, Pennsylvania, USA	
13	13-0	(Dominican Republic) Feliberto Alvarez	TKO	22 Aug 2004	Club de Villa Consuelo, Santo Domingo, Dominican Republic	
12	12-0	(Mexico) Israel Garcia	UD	2 Apr 2004	(United States) Blue Horizon, Philadelphia, Pennsylvania, USA	
11	11-0	(United States) Adam Stewart	TKO	12 Dec 2003	(United States) DePaul Athletic Center, Chicago, Illinois, USA	
10	10-0	(Cuba) Oriol Martinez	UD	22 Oct 2003	(United States) Crowne Plaza Hotel, New York, New York, USA	
9	9-0	(Cuba) Andres Larrinaga	UD	29 Aug 2003	(United States) Sovereign Center, Reading, Pennsylvania, USA	
8	8-0	(United States) Patrick Thompson	MD	4 Apr 2003	(United States) Fernwood Resort, Bushkill, Pennsylvania, USA	
7	7-0	(Dominican Republic) Nelson Gil	KO	21 Mar 2003	Coliseo Carlos 'Teo' Cruz, Santo Domingo, Dominican Republic	
6	6-0	(Dominican Republic) Adalberto Marte	KO	10 Jan 2003	(United States) Rex Plex Center, Elizabeth, New Jersey, USA	
5	5-0	(United States) Jorge Garcia	UD	5 Jul 2002	(United States) Civic Center Arena, Laredo, Texas, USA	
4	4-0	(Ghana) Muhammed Nuhu	UD	18 May 2002	(United States) Mohegan Sun Casino, Uncasville, Connecticut, USA	
3	3-0	(United States) Curtis Wilkens	UD	12 Apr 2002	(United States) Park Theatre, Union City, New Jersey, USA	
2	2-0	(Uzbekistan) Bagrat Makhkamov	TKO	15 Mar 2002	(United States) Fernwood Resort, Bushkill, Pennsylvania, USA	
1	1-0	(United States) Jim Combs	TKO	2 Feb 2002	(United States) Ballys Park Place Hotel Casino, Atlantic City, New Jersey, USA	
