= Ali Raymi =

Yemeni boxer

Ali Raymi علي الريمي
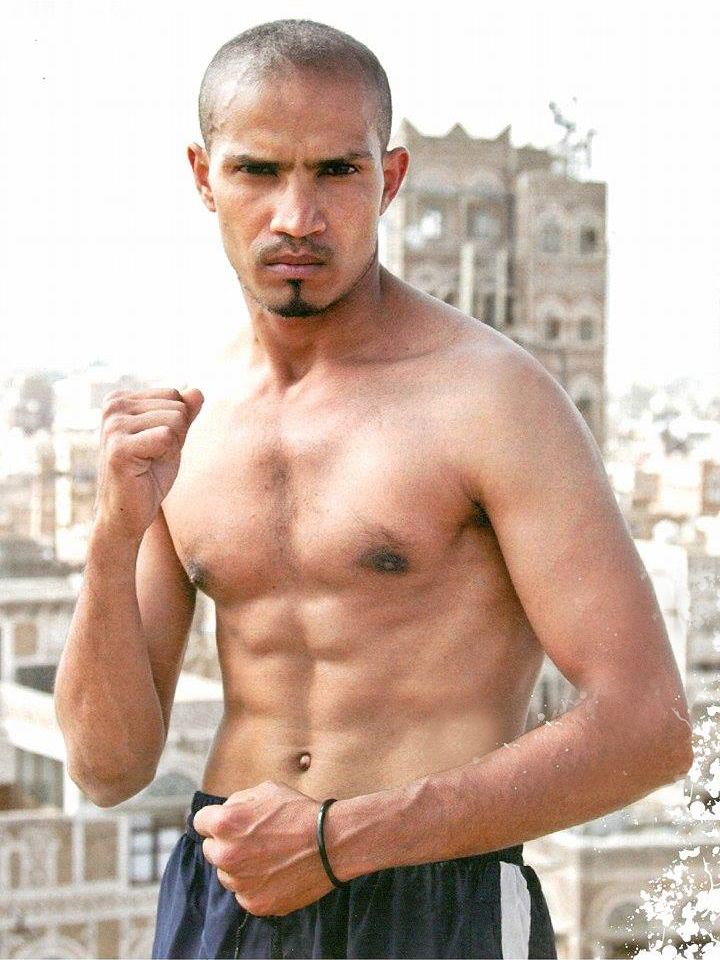
- Raymi in 2013

Personal information
- Nicknames: God; TGE (The Greatest Ever)
- Born: Ali Ibrahim Ali Al-Raimi; 7 December 1973 Mecca, Saudi Arabia
- Died: 23 May 2015 (aged 41) Sana'a, Yemen
- Weight: Minimumweight; Light-flyweight; Flyweight

Boxing career
- Reach: 68 in (173 cm)
- Stance: Orthodox

Boxing record
- Total fights: 26
- Wins: 26
- Win by KO: 26

Ali Raymi
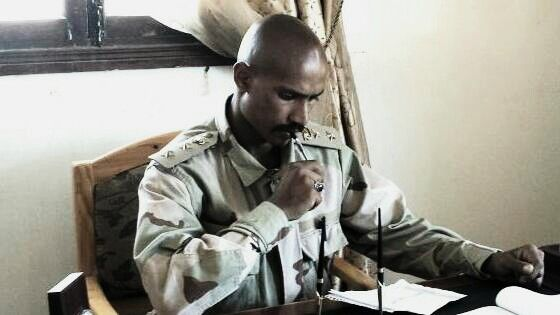
- Colonel Ali Raymi, 2015

Military service
- Allegiance: Yemen
- Branch/service: Yemen Army
- Years of service: 1991–2015
- Rank: Colonel
- Unit: 3rd Armored Brigade, RG
- Commands: Yemeni Republican Guard
- Battles/wars: Yemeni Civil War (1994); Al-Qaeda insurgency in Yemen; First Battle of Lawdar; Battle of Zinjibar; Battle of Huta; 2012 Abyan offensive; Second Battle of Lawdar; 2014 hostage rescue; Battle of Radda; Houthi insurgency in Yemen; Operation Blow to the Head

Ali Raymi (born Ali Ibrahim Ali Al-Raimi; Arabic: علي الريمي; 7 December 1973 – 23 May 2015) was a Yemeni professional boxer and military officer. In boxing he is best known for his fight record of 26 wins and no losses, with all 26 wins by knockout; 23 in the first round. On 17 July 2014, he set a new world record by winning his first 21 professional fights by first-round knockout. He won the International Boxing Institute (IBI) minimumweight title when he beat Prince Maz. Also that year, he won the Universal Boxing Organization (UBO) World Junior Flyweight title.

Raymi lived in Mecca, Saudi Arabia prior to 1991. He was killed in action by an explosion, possibly from a Qatari airstrike on Yemeni Republican Guard positions during the Saudi Arabian-led intervention in the Yemeni Civil War, on 23 May 2015 in Sana'a. He was ranked No. 6 by the World Boxing Association (WBA) at 108 pounds and No. 8 by the World Boxing Organization (WBO) at 105 pounds at the time of his death.

== Personal life ==
Raymi won a gold medal in Algeria for the Yemeni military, representing the amateur boxing team, his purported amateur record was 117–2, all by way of knockout, although there is no proof of this record. Stories of Raymi's life including his military career were released by his filmmaker manager Felix Arno in an interview with The Ring magazine managing editor Brian Harty.

== Boxing career ==
Yemeni News archives show Raymi started boxing at the age of 30 representing the Yemeni military, compiling an amateur record of 117–2, winning all 117 by KO which many believe to be embellished. He was a Yemeni amateur champion in 2004, 2005, 2006 and 2007. It was during this time that Raymi started breaking Yemeni cultural norms by challenging foreign fighters, and participating in private unsanctioned fights for the next three years. Raymi grew to have a reputation in Sana'a as a loose cannon.

=== Setting the World Record ===
On 17 July 2014, he set a new world record by winning his first 21 professional fights by first-round knockout.

=== Prince Maz 2014 tetralogy ===
Prince Maz was the first fighter to extend Ali Raymi outside the first round, repeating the feat in three out of four encounters

- RTD1, 2014-07-17
- TKO7, 2014-08-30
- RTD9, 2014-10-16
- TKO2, 2014-11-19

== Death ==
Raymi, a Colonel in the Yemeni Anti-Terrorism forces, was killed in an explosion on 23 May 2015.

=== Postmortem ranking ===
In December 2013, Raymi was ranked in the top ten by two major boxing sanctioning bodies: seventh by the WBO and ninth by the WBC. Additionally, the IBO had ranked him number one in August 2014, while the WBO improved his ranking to sixth in January 2015, as did the WBA in May 2015. Raymi also offered $100,000 to then-WBA and IBO strawweight champion Hekkie Budler for a fight in Yemen. The WBA ranked Raymi as #6 light flyweight in April 2015 and only dropped him five ranking spots to eleventh place when he died.

Dan Rafael, senior boxing writer at ESPN, criticized the organization for the "utterly and absolutely indefensible" ranking situation. He explained, commenting that Raymi's record was "hollow... considering he fought absolutely nobody of remote recognition or accomplishment as he fashioned that glittering but meaningless mark..."

== Professional boxing record ==
26 fights	26 wins	0 losses
By knockout	26	0

No.	Result	Record	Opponent	Type	Round, time	Date	Location	Notes
26	Win	26–0	Omar Moxamad	KO	1 (12)	29 Apr 2015	22 May Stadium, Aden, Yemen	
25	Win	25–0	Omar Moxamad	KO	1 (12), 0:46	28 Mar 2015	22 May Stadium, Aden, Yemen	
24	Win	24–0	Prince Maz	TKO	2 (12), 0:27	19 Nov 2014	22 May Stadium, Aden, Yemen	Won IBI and UBO light-flyweight titles
23	Win	23–0	Prince Maz	RTD	9 (12), 3:00	16 Oct 2014	22 May Stadium, Aden, Yemen	Won IBI minimumweight title
22	Win	22–0	Prince Maz	TKO	7 (12), 1:55	30 Aug 2014	22 May Stadium, Aden, Yemen	
21	Win	21–0	Prince Maz	RTD	1 (12), 2:55	17 Jul 2014	22 May Stadium, Aden, Yemen	
20	Win	20–0	Akram Jawfi	KO	1 (12), 1:27	10 Nov 2013	22 May Stadium, Aden, Yemen	
19	Win	19–0	Ali Salem	TKO	1 (12), 1:02	5 Nov 2013	22 May Stadium, Aden, Yemen	
18	Win	18–0	Mustafa Humaidi	KO	1 (12), 0:47	1 Nov 2013	22 May Stadium, Aden, Yemen	
17	Win	17–0	Omar Awdan	KO	1 (12), 1:18	20 Oct 2013	22 May Stadium, Aden, Yemen	
16	Win	16–0	Husam Shargabi	KO	1 (12), 0:58	11 Oct 2013	22 May Stadium, Aden, Yemen	
15	Win	15–0	Yasin Abdulkhalik	TKO	1 (12), 2:05	7 Oct 2013	22 May Stadium, Aden, Yemen	
14	Win	14–0	Asam Dolbhante	KO	1 (12), 1:34	30 Sep 2013	22 May Stadium, Aden, Yemen	
13	Win	13–0	Luke Hasan	KO	1 (12), 0:26	27 Sep 2013	22 May Stadium, Aden, Yemen	
12	Win	12–0	Ali Dridi	KO	1 (4), 2:11	14 Jul 2013	Yemen Boxing Federation Gym, Sana'a, Yemen	
11	Win	11–0	Salman Umari	KO	1 (4), 1:27	7 Jul 2013	22 May Stadium, Aden, Yemen	
10	Win	10–0	Yaser Dalbant	KO	1 (4), 1:50	4 Jul 2013	22 May Stadium, Aden, Yemen	
9	Win	9–0	Ahmed Saeed	KO	1 (4), 0:55	30 Jun 2013	22 May Stadium, Aden, Yemen	
8	Win	8–0	Farhan Shebana	KO	1 (4), 1:45	23 Jun 2013	22 May Stadium, Aden, Yemen	
7	Win	7–0	Ahmed Yousifi	KO	1 (4), 2:39	11 Jun 2013	22 May Stadium, Aden, Yemen	
6	Win	6–0	Ahmad Ciso	KO	1 (4), 0:55	30 May 2013	22 May Stadium, Aden, Yemen	
5	Win	5–0	Amad Al-Gadsi	KO	1 (4), 2:49	6 May 2013	Yemen Boxing Federation Gym, Sana'a, Yemen	
4	Win	4–0	Rashad Horun	KO	1 (12), 1:12	11 Apr 2011	Yemen Boxing Federation Gym, Sana'a, Yemen	
3	Win	3–0	Sabin Juma	KO	1 (12), 1:23	30 Mar 2011	Yemen Boxing Federation Gym, Sana'a, Yemen	
2	Win	2–0	Hamdan Jaber	KO	1 (4), 0:41	5 Mar 2011	Yemen Boxing Federation Gym, Sana'a, Yemen	
1	Win	1–0	Hasan Wesabi	KO	1 (4), 1:29	25 Jan 2011	Yemen Boxing Federation Gym, Sana'a, Yemen	

Records
Preceded by Tyrone Brunson; 19	Most consecutive first-round knockouts 21; 14 July 2014 – present	Incumbent
