= Operation Blow to the Head =

2010 anti-Houthi operation in Yemen

- Part of the Houthi insurgency in Yemen (Operation Scorched Earth)
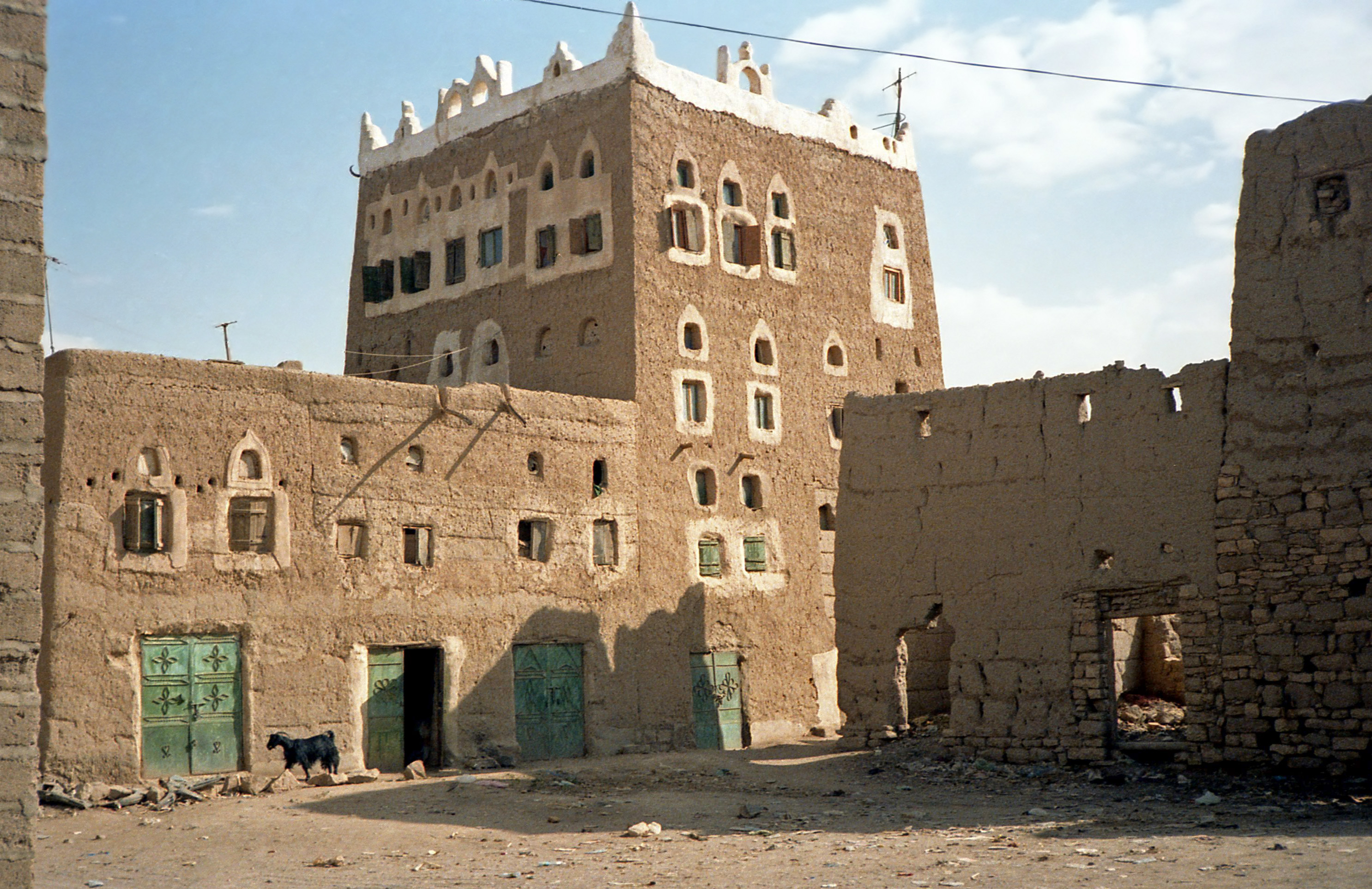
- A mud house in Saada.
Date	13 January – 12 February 2010 (4 weeks and 2 days)
Location	Saada, Saada Governorate, Yemen 16.985833°N 43.764444°E
Result	Truce

Belligerents
Yemen	Houthis

Commanders and leaders
Ali Abdullah Saleh; Ali Raymi	Abdul-Malik al-Houthi

Casualties and losses
Unknown	24 killed 25 captured
- Location within Yemen

Operation Blow to the Head was a Yemeni military operation against the militants in the insurgent Yemeni town of Saada in the Saada Governorate. The Yemeni government troops began trying to capture the town on 13 January 2010. On that day, the Islamic militant Abdullah Mehdar was killed by Yemeni security forces.

== Region insurgency ==
In June 2004, insurgency returned in Yemen. The Yemeni government allegedly received help from the United States in controlling the insurgent force. From June to August 2004, Houthis battled with the Yemeni government under Hussein Badreddin al-Houthi. Hussein was killed in the insurgency by September. His brother, Abdul-Malik al-Houthi took over command over the insurgents, and leads them today. The allies launched Operation Scorched Earth, but the rebels agreed to a short truce on 12 February 2010.

== Operation ==
The Yemeni government troops led a military operation against the insurgent town of Saada. Other Islamic rebels also fought against the Yemeni troops, with the fighting destroying much of the old Saada city. Many buildings were reduced to rubble. Abdullah Mehdar was killed in a gunfight with security forces on the opening day of the conflict. 15 Houthi fighters were killed in the next two days in the operation. On 19 January 2010, several rebels were killed by government forces in raids on Houthi hideouts in the old corner of the north. The operation ended after a truce was declared by both sides on 12 February 2010.
