= Tyrone Brunson (boxer) =

American boxer (born 1985)

Personal information
- Nickname: Young Gun
- Born: January 29, 1985 (age 41) Philadelphia, Pennsylvania, U.S.
- Height: 5 ft 9 1/2 in (177 cm)
- Weight: Light middleweight Middleweight

Boxing career
- Reach: 76 1/2 in (194 cm)

Boxing record
- Total fights: 38
- Wins: 28
- Win by KO: 25
- Losses: 8
- Draws: 2

Tyrone Brunson (born January 29, 1985) is an American professional boxer, notable for holding the record of the most consecutive first-round knockouts for over 6 years (8 March 2008 – 6 July 2014).

== Amateur career ==
Brunson hails from Philadelphia, Pennsylvania and comes from a long line of middleweight boxers from the city. His amateur career extended over 90 fights, finishing with a record of 82–12.

== Professional career ==
Brunson turned professional in 2005 with a KO victory over Kevin Carey in a fight which lasted just 25 seconds. He had 7 more fights that year, all of which ended in 1st-round KO victories for Brunson. As with his debut 4 of those fights lasted less than 30 seconds, with his quickest victory coming in just 17 seconds against Terry Rork.

Brunson's KO streak continued into 2006, where in his first fight of the year he defeated James Morrow for the Mid American middleweight title.

On June 24, 2017, Brunson scored the biggest win of his career against seasoned veteran Kermit Cintron, a respected and dangerous puncher. In Philly's Fight of the Year, Brunson overcame two knockdowns to put Cintron on the floor three times to win by KO.

== Chasing the record ==
By early 2007 Brunson's record had improved to 14–0, with all of his victories coming in the 1st round, and he was closing in on the unofficial North American record for consecutive 1st-round KOs held by Arthur "Young Otto" Susskind, who was credited with 15 consecutive 1st-round KO victories in the early 20th century. The major difference between Brunson's and Otto's streaks is that Brunson's began with his pro debut whereas Otto's streak did not start until well into his pro career.

On March 9, 2007, he equaled Otto's record when he KO'd David Johnson after 52 seconds of the 1st round. Brunson's record equaling effort was almost foiled due to a bizarre accident: Early in the bout Johnson managed to get tangled up with referee Dale Grable, which caused him to fall and injure his ankle. Despite only being able to limp around the ring he indicated to the referee that he wished to continue and the bout restarted. A few seconds later Johnson was legitimately knocked down with a barrage of punches from Brunson. This time he decided that his ankle injury was too painful and chose not to continue. As the second knockdown was as a result of a punch and not a slip the referee ruled the bout a TKO victory for Brunson (Had Johnson decided his ankle injury was too severe to continue when it first happened, the bout would have been ruled a No Contest).

Brunson claimed the North American record as his own on May 5, 2007, by KO’ing Tony Watson after just 100 seconds of the 1st round, moving his record to a perfect 16–0. The next milestone in his sights was the world record held by Edwin Valero of Venezuela with 18 consecutive 1st-round KOs. Brunson equalled Valero's total with a victory over Jamie Waru at the Sky City Casino in Auckland, New Zealand on June 8, 2007, and on March 8, 2008, recorded his record-breaking 19th consecutive 1st-round KO when he defeated Francis McKechnai in just 72 seconds at the Soaring Eagle Casino in Michigan.

On 15 August 2008 Brunson's run of consecutive 1st-round KO victories was brought to a halt at 19 when, in his 20th pro fight, he was held to a draw in a 6-round contest against Mexican journeyman Antonio Soriano. The decision was greeted with a chorus of boos from the attending audience, who felt that Soriano had done enough to gain the victory

On December 4, 2009, Brunson fought Carson Jones. Brunson had a great first two rounds (of a 10-round fight) sticking Jones with hard, straight jabs. His luck changed in the third round. Jones hit Brunson with a great combo, knocking him down for the first time in his career. Jones continued to pound on Brunson until Brunson was no longer defending himself, the referee then stopped the match, declaring Jones the winner by TKO.

On November 10, 2013, Yemeni minimumweight Boxer Ali Raymi broke Brunson's record by scoring his 20th consecutive first-round knockout.

On October 31, 2015, Brunson suffered a decision loss to undefeated prospect Caleb Plant in A PBC Undercard.

== Criticism ==
The main criticism leveled at Brunson by some boxing pundits and fans is the extremely poor level of opposition he has faced while making his way to the record. In contrast with Valero, whose first 18 opponents had a combined record of 112-102-17 (1.1 win rate), the combined record of Brunson's opponents was just 60-94-8 (0.6 win rate). Furthermore, of those 18 opponents just 1 had a winning record and 6 had failed to win a single fight in their careers.

== 2017 resurgence ==
After suffering from a string of consecutive losses (2014–2015), Brunson scored two consecutive upset wins in 2017 against Brandon Quarles & former IBF Welterweight World Champion Kermit Cintron.

== Professional boxing record ==
37 fights	28 wins	7 losses
By knockout	25	4
By decision	3	3
Draws	2	

No.	Result	Record	Opponent	Type	Round, time	Date	Location	Notes
34	Win	26–6–2	(United States) Manny Woods	RTD	8 (10), 3:00	Dec 1, 2017	Arena VFG, Guadalajara, Mexico	Won vacant UBF International super welterweight title
33	Win	25–6–2	(United States) Kermit Cintron	KO	5 (10), 1:21	Jun 24, 2017	(United States) 2300 Arena, Philadelphia, Pennsylvania, U.S.	Won vacant USA Pennsylvania State super welterweight title
32	Win	24–6–2	(United States) Brandon Quarles	SD	8	Mar 11, 2017	Palenque de la Feria, Tuxtla Gutiérrez, Mexico	
31	Draw	23–6–2	(United States) Ismael Garcia	SD	8	Oct 14, 2016	Tepic, Mexico	
30	Win	23–6–1	(Puerto Rico) Carlos Garcia Hernandez	KO	4 (8), 0:45	Aug 5, 2016	Auditorio Siglo XXI, Puebla, Mexico	
29	Loss	22–6–1	(United States) Caleb Plant	UD	8	Oct 31, 2015	Auditorio Benito Juárez, Zapopan, Mexico	
28	Loss	22–5–1	(Republic of Ireland) Dennis Hogan	UD	10	Apr 17, 2015	Xcaret Park, Cancún, Mexico	For vacant NBA-NABA USA super welterweight title
27	Loss	22–4–1	(United States) Tony Harrison	TKO	1 (8), 1:02	Dec 20, 2014	Gimnasio Niños Héroes, Tepic, Mexico	
26	Loss	22–3–1	(United States) Decarlo Perez	TKO	5 (8), 2:29	Oct 18, 2014	Auditorio Benito Juárez, Zapopan, Mexico	
25	Win	22–2–1	(Dominican Republic) Hansel Mateo	KO	1 (6), 1:33	Jun 1, 2014	Foro Scotiabank, Mexico City, Mexico	
24	Loss	21–2–1	(Mexico) James de la Rosa	UD	8	Feb 23, 2012	(United States) Miccosukee Resort & Gaming, Miami, Florida, U.S.	
23	Loss	21–1–1	(United States) Carson Jones	TKO	3 (10), 2:39	Dec 4, 2009	(United States) Morongo Casino Resort & Spa, Cabazon, California, U.S.	
22	Win	21–0–1	(Puerto Rico) Jose Medina	KO	3 (10), 1:31	Nov 7, 2009	Auditorio Benito Juárez, Zapopan, Mexico	
21	Win	20–0–1	(Venezuela) Marcos Primera	UD	8	Oct 2, 2009	Palenque Calle 2, Zapopan, Mexico	
20	Draw	19–0–1	(Mexico) Antonio Soriano	MD	6	Aug 15, 2008	(United States) Barclays Center, New York City, New York, U.S.	
19	Win	19–0	(United States) Francis McKechnai	TKO	1 (4), 1:12	Mar 9, 2008	Salon Marbet Plus, Ciudad Nezahualcóyotl, Mexico	
18	Win	18–0	(New Zealand) Jamie Waru	TKO	1 (4), 2:56	Jun 8, 2007	Coliseo Olimpico de la UG, Guadalajara, Mexico	
17	Win	17–0	(New Zealand) Lee Hunter	KO	1 (4), 0:59	Jun 4, 2007	Salon Marbet Plus, Ciudad Nezahualcóyotl, Mexico	
16	Win	16–0	(New Zealand) Tony Watson	KO	1 (4), 1:40	May 5, 2007	Auditorio Benito Juarez, Guadalajara, Mexico	
15	Win	15–0	(United States) David Johnson	TKO	1 (4), 0:52	Mar 9, 2007	Coliseo Olímpico, Guadalajara, Mexico	
14	Win	14–0	(United States) Kirk Douglas	KO	1 (4), 2:13	Feb 9, 2007	Arena Coliseo, Guadalajara, Mexico	
13	Win	13–0	(United States) Guy Packer	KO	1 (4), 2:24	Sep 15, 2006	Casino de los Fresnos, Tepic, Mexico	
12	Win	12–0	(United States) Chris Grays	TKO	1 (6), 1:23	Jul 1, 2006	Auditorio Benito Juarez, Guadalajara, Mexico	
11	Win	11–0	(United States) Charles Dalton	KO	1 (6), 0:30	Jun 3, 2006	Arena-Casino Los Fresnos, Tepic, Mexico	
10	Win	10–0	(United States) Terry Johnson	TKO	1 (6), 1:10	Apr 8, 2006	Casino Los Fresnos, Tepic, Mexico	
9	Win	9–0	(United States) James Morrow	TKO	1 (8), 1:04	Feb 4, 2006	Arena Jalisco, Guadalajara, Mexico	
8	Win	8–0	(United States) Ian Rumler	TKO	1 (6), 1:39	Dec 17, 2005	Tonalá, Mexico	
7	Win	7–0	(United States) Bill Tipton	TKO	1 (6), 2:15	Nov 19, 2005	Guadalajara, Mexico	
6	Win	6–0	(United States) Joe Harrison	KO	1 (4), 0:21	Oct 7, 2005	Arena Coliseo, Guadalajara, Mexico	
5	Win	5–0	(United States) Antonio Scott	TKO	1 (4), 1:44	Aug 27, 2005	Auditorio Fausto Gutierrez Moreno, Tijuana, Mexico	
4	Win	4–0	(United States) Terry Rork	KO	1 (6), 0:17	Aug 20, 2005	Men's Club, Guadalajara, Mexico	
3	Win	3–0	(United States) Demiko Moore	KO	1 (4), 0:29	Jul 30, 2005	Guadalajara, Mexico	
2	Win	2–0	(United States) Ralf Franklin	KO	1 (6), 0:18	Jun 10, 2005	Arena Chololo Larios, Tonalá, Mexico	
1	Win	1–0	(United States) Kevin Carey	TKO	1 (4), 0:25	Apr 4, 2005	Arena Chololo Larios, Tonalá, Mexico	

Records
Preceded by Edwin Valero; 18	Most consecutive first-round knockouts 19; 8 March 2008 – 14 July 2014	Succeeded by Ali Raymi; 21
