= Arturo Gatti vs. Alfonso Gómez =

Boxing match

Coast to Coast: Gatti vs. Gómez
- Date: July 14, 2007
- Venue: Boardwalk Hall, Atlantic City, New Jersey, U.S.

Tale of the tape
Boxer	Arturo Gatti	Alfonso Gómez
Nickname	Thunder	
Hometown	Montreal, Quebec, Canada	Guadalajara, Jalisco, Mexico
Pre-fight record	40–8 (31 KO)	16–3–2 (7 KO)
Age	35 years, 2 months	26 years, 8 months
Height	5 ft 8 in (173 cm)	5 ft 9 in (175 cm)
Weight	147 lb (67 kg)	146 lb (66 kg)
Style	Orthodox	Orthodox
Recognition	WBC; No. 12 Ranked Welterweight; 2-division world champion	IBA welterweight champion

Result
- Gómez wins via 7th-round technical knockout

Arturo Gatti vs. Alfonso Gómez was a professional boxing match contested on July 14, 2007.

== Background ==
One year prior, 2-division world champion Arturo Gatti had failed in his bid for a third world title, losing a lopsided affair to WBC champion Carlos Baldomir via ninth-round technical knockout. Following his loss Gatti mulled retirement stating afterwards "I don't know if I'm ever going to fight again. I had a good time doing it." Finally, after nine months of inactivity, it was announced in late April 2007 that Gatti would make a comeback that July against The Contender contestant Alfonso Gómez. Originally, Gatti had wanted to face either Dmitry Salita or Edgar Santana, but HBO, who had aired a majority of Gatti's fights, refused both relatively unknown fighters and instead insisted that Gatti face the more well-known former world champions Paul Spadafora or Steve Forbes, the latter having also been a finalist on the second season of The Contender. HBO relented on Gómez when they were able to secure a Antonio Margarito–Paul Williams welterweight title fight to pair with the Gatti–Gómez bout. Dubbed Coast to Coast, HBO would broadcast a dual-site tripleheader event that would also see an IBF welterweight title fight between Kermit Cintrón and Walter Matthysse take place in Atlantic City, New Jersey alongside Gatti–Gómez followed by Magarito–Williams in Carson, California.

After Gatti had been dominated in his last fight against Baldomir and feeling he should not continue his boxing career, Gatti's longtime trainer James "Buddy" McGirt declined to train Gatti for the Gómez fight, ending their near six-year partnership. Instead, Gatti turned to his rival-turned-friend Micky Ward, with whom Gatti had fought in a trilogy of acclaimed bouts in 2002 and 2003. Ward stated he was "shocked" when Gatti asked to train him, but nevertheless was "looking forward" to the opportunity and claimed that Gatti "has something left, more than he showed in his last fight."

== Fight Details ==
Though Gómez was not known as heavy puncher, he nevertheless dominated Gatti throughout the fight. Gómez was the aggressor and landed punches almost at will, landing 216 total punches through 6+ round, 142 of which were considered power punches, while Gatti only managed to land 76 punches. By the end of the second round, Gatti's face was noticeably swollen and in the fourth, Gómez landed four unanswered right hands that stunned Gatti. Gómez would finally end the fight in the seventh round, when he backed Gatti into the ropes after landing a hard right hand and then followed with a barrage which ended with another big right that sent an exhausted Gatti down. Referee Randy Neumann began his 10-count as the clearly hurt Gatti struggled to his knees, but New Jersey State Athletic Control Board commissioner Larry Hazzard entered the ring before Neumann could finish and stopped the fight. Gómez was named the winner by technical knockout at 2:12 of the round.

== Aftermath ==
In the dressing room, after the fight, Gatti would announce his retirement. Telling reporters "I'm coming back, as a spectator."

== Fight card ==
Confirmed bouts:

Weight Class	Weight		vs.		Method	Round	Notes
Welterweight	147 lbs.	Alfonso Gómez	def.	Arturo Gatti	TKO	7/10
Welterweight	147 lbs.	Kermit Cintrón (c)	def.	Walter Matthysse	KO	2/12	^{note 1}
Middleweight	160 lbs.	Giovanni Lorenzo	def.	Sherwin Davis	TKO	3/10
Light Middleweight	154 lbs.	Paweł Wolak	def.	Edgar Reyes	TKO	2/8
Flyweight	112 lbs.	Raúl Martínez	def.	Evaristo Primero	RTD	5/6
Light Middleweight	154 lbs.	Henry Crawford	def.	Joshua Hammock	KO	1/6
Welterweight	147 lbs.	Kassem Wilson	def.	Sergio Garcia	UD	4

^Note 1 For IBF Welterweight Title

== Broadcasting ==
Country	Broadcaster
United States	HBO

Preceded by vs. Carlos Baldomir	Arturo Gatti's bouts 14 July 2007	Retired
Preceded by vs. Martin Concepcion	Alfonso Gómez's bouts 14 July 2007	Succeeded by vs. Ben Tackie
