= Carson Jones =

American boxer (1986–2025)

Personal information
- Nickname: Mr.
- Born: Carson Douglas Jones; August 19, 1986 Oklahoma City, Oklahoma, U.S.
- Died: March 1, 2025 (aged 38) Oklahoma City, Oklahoma, U.S
- Height: 5 ft 9 in (175 cm)
- Weight: Welterweight; Light middleweight

Boxing career
- Reach: 72 in (183 cm)
- Stance: Orthodox

Boxing record
- Total fights: 65
- Wins: 44
- Win by KO: 32
- Losses: 16
- Draws: 3
- No contests: 2

Carson Jones (August 19, 1986 – March 1, 2025) was an American professional boxer at welterweight and the former USBA welterweight champion, who was also the NABA light-middle weight champion, the WBC Continental Americas light-middle weight champion (May 7, 2009), and the NABA USA light middleweight champion. Carson achieved his highest ranking in May 2012, when he was placed as the #4 rated welterweight in the world by the IBF. He competed from 2004 to 2023.

== Professional career ==
=== 2004–2009 ===
Jones began his professional career at the age of 18 on October 5, 2004, with a TKO win over Sheldon Mosley. Starting in the light-middle weight division he would go on to earn a record of 23–7–1 (15 KOs) by the end of 2009. He credited his early losses to his previous management throwing him in the ring prematurely. For losses, by the end of 2009, his opposition's combined recorded was 102–19–8. His first loss came by way of unanimous decision to Favio Media (7–1–2) with whom he had previously fought to a draw.

==== Carson Jones vs. Alfonso Gomez ====
After turning age 20 a little more than two weeks prior, Jones fought Alfonso Gomez at the ARCO Arena in Sacramento, California on August 25, 2006. Throughout the match Gomez aggressively pressured an outmatched Jones, eventually winning a premature and controversial stoppage in the eighth and final round. Jones was clearly unharmed and able to continue defending himself but the referee declared a TKO.

==== Carson Jones vs. Jesus Soto Karass ====
On February 6, 2009, Jones fought Jesus Soto Karass at the Maywood Activity Center in Maywood, California. Although Karass scored two knockdowns in the 3rd round, the fight was highly competitive. Karass would win by unanimous decision although being deducted one point for hitting Jones in the back of the head.

==== Carson Jones vs. Tyrone Brunson ====
Jones met Tyrone Brunson on December 4, 2009, at the Chumash Casino in Santa Ynez, California. Brunson had scored a record 20 first-round knockouts in his first 21 professional fights but the quality of opposition that he had faced was debatable. By the third round Jones effectively exposed Brunson's lack of skill by countering with a devastating combo, flooring him for the first time in his career. Jones then aggressively pounded Brunson until earning a stoppage by TKO.

=== Professional career, 2010–2023 ===
Jones changed management in 2009 and by 2010 began routinely fighting as a welterweight. He amassed a record of 13–2–1 (8 KOs) since 2010 with one loss coming by split decision and the other by majority decision.

==== Carson Jones vs. Said Ouali ====
Carson and Said Ouali clashed on September 17, 2011, at the MGM Grand in Las Vegas on the undercard of Floyd Mayweather Jr. vs. Victor Ortiz. After a competitive 7 rounds, Jones stopped Ouali after his right eye became swollen shut. Jones was leading on all the score cards at the time. In addition, Jones scored a knockdown in the 4th round.

==== Carson Jones vs. Ricardo Williams Jr. ====
Jones disposed of Ricardo Williams Jr. with a fourth-round TKO at Remington Park in Oklahoma City, Oklahoma on December 15, 2011. Williams is best known for his performance in the 2000 Olympic Games which saw him win a Silver Medal as a light welterweight. Nonetheless, Carson's dominance was convincing as he scored three knockdowns en route to his victory.

==== Carson Jones vs. Kell Brook ====
On July 7, 2012, Jones and Kell Brook went to war at the Motorpoint Arena in Sheffield, Yorkshire, United Kingdom. Billed as the "Edge of Glory" the match was an IBF welterweight title eliminator pairing the undefeated Brook against Jones in his first overseas appearance. Jones adopted a reserved strategy for the first half of the bout allowing his opponent to win all of the first 6 rounds, while gradually landing body blows. Over the second half of the match Carson increased the pressure breaking Brook's nose, targeting his body, and winning the majority of the final six rounds. Despite this, Brook won a majority decision.

Jones' determination and drive in the fight impressed many spectators in the UK resulting in him being awarded the 2012 Overseas Fighter of the Year recognition by the British Boxing Board of Control.

== Death ==
On March 1, 2025, it was announced that Carson had died from complications of gastrointestinal surgery. He was 38.

== Titles ==
On April 18, 2008, Jones beat Jose Adelaydo Gonzalez by unanimous decision to win the vacant NABA USA light middleweight title.

On May 7, 2009, Jones convincingly handled Michi Munoz by TKO in round 10 of 12 to win the vacant WBC Continental Americas light middle weight title. He would later vacate the title.

On April 22, 2010, Jones beat Jason LeHoullier by TKO to win the NABA light middleweight title. He would later lose the title to Rogerio Pereira by split decision.

Jones fought veteran boxer Michael Clark on May 5, 2011, at the Crowne Plaza Hotel in Tulsa, Oklahoma. Jones scored a victory after Clark was unable to continue after an accidental low blow in the second round. The TKO loss was the fourth KO loss of Clark's career and gave Jones the USBA welterweight title. In all, Jones successfully defended his title twice.

== Professional boxing record ==
40 Wins (30 knockouts, 10 decisions), 13 Losses 3 Draws
Res.	Record	Opponent	Type	Rd., Time	Date	Location	Notes
Loss	40-13-3	(United Kingdom) Ted Cheeseman	UD	10	2018-02-03	(United Kingdom) The O2 Arena, London, England	
Loss	40-12-3	(Mexico) Antonio Margarito	TD	7 (10), 3:00	2017-09-02	Gimnasio Manuel Bernardo Aguirre, Chihuahua City, Mexico	
Win	40-11-3	(United Kingdom) Ben Hall	TKO	6 (10)	2016-11-26	(United Kingdom) Wembley Arena, London, England	
Win	39-11-3	(United States) Starr Johnson	KO	2 (8)	2016-08-20	(United States) Wisconsin Center, Milwaukee, Wisconsin	
Win	38-11-3	(United States) Mikel Williams	TKO	3 (6)	2016-04-30	(United States) Remington Park, Oklahoma City, Oklahoma	
Loss	37-11-3	(United Kingdom) Brian Rose	UD	12	2015-08-01	(United Kingdom) Craven Park, Hull, Yorkshire, England	
Win	37-10-3	(United Kingdom) Brian Rose	TKO	1 (12)	2015-02-14	(United Kingdom) Winter Gardens, Blackpool, Lancashire, England	
Win	36-10-3	(United States) Shannon Miller	KO	3 (12)	2014-09-27	OKC Downtown Airpark, Oklahoma City, Oklahoma, United States	
Loss	35-10-3	(United Kingdom) Kell Brook	TKO	8 (10), 1:07	2013-07-13	(United Kingdom) Craven Park, Hull, Yorkshire, England	
Win	35-9-3	(United States) Travis Hartman	KO	3 (6), 1:23	2013-04-25	(United States) Hyatt Regency Hotel, Tulsa, Oklahoma	
Draw	34-9-3	(Republic of Ireland) Dean Byrne	PTS	8	2012-12-08	(United Kingdom) Olympia, Kensington, London, England	
Loss	34-9-2	(United Kingdom) Kell Brook	MD	12	2012-07-07	(United Kingdom) Motorpoint Arena, Sheffield, England	
Win	34-8-2	(United States) Allen Conyers	TKO	9 (12), 0:25	2012-04-26	(United States) Hyatt Regency Hotel, Tulsa, Oklahoma	Defended USBA welterweight title
Win	33-8-2	(United States) Ricardo Williams Jr.	TKO	4 (12)	2011-12-15	(United States) Remington Park, Oklahoma City, Oklahoma	Defended USBA welterweight title
Win	32-8-2	(Morocco) Said Ouali	RTD	7 (19), 3:00	2011-09-17	(United States) MGM Grand, Paradise, Nevada	
Win	31-8-2	(United States) Germaine Sanders	TKO	6 (8), 2:05	2011-07-09	(United States) Remington Park, Oklahoma City, Oklahoma	
Win	30-8-2	(United States) Michael Clark	TKO	2 (12), 1:53	2011-05-05	(United States) Crowne Plaza Hotel, Tulsa, Oklahoma	Won vacant USBA welterweight title
Win	29-8-2	(Azerbaijan) Rahman Yusubov	TKO	4 (8), 2:05	2010-12-10	(United States) Remington Park, Oklahoma City, Oklahoma	
Win	28-8-2	(Mexico) Donovan Castaneda	TKO	1 (8)	2010-12-10	(United States) Memorial Hall, Kansas City, Kansas	
Win	27-8-2	(Mexico) Roberto Valenzuela	TKO	5 (6), 1:17	2010-11-09	(United States) Remington Park, Oklahoma City, Oklahoma	
Loss	26-8-2	(Brazil) Rogerio Pereira	SD	10	2010-09-10	(United States) Memorial Hall, Kansas City, Kansas	Loss NABA light middleweight title
Win	26-7-2	(United States) Jason LeHoullier	TKO	9(10), 0:51	2010-04-22	(United States) Crowne Plaza Hotel, Tulsa, Oklahoma	Won vacant NABA light middleweight title
Draw	25-7-2	(United States) Delray Raines	MD	6	2010-03-19	(United States) Choctaw Gaming Center, Durant, Oklahoma	
Win	25-7-1	(Mexico) Eloy Suarez	UD	5	2010-01-28	(United States) Coca-Cola Center, Oklahoma City, Oklahoma	
Win	24-7-1	(United States) Tyrone Brunson	TKO	3 (10), 2:39	2009-12-04	(United States) Chumash Casino, Santa Ynez, California	
Win	23-7-1	(United States) Jose Adelaydo Gonzalez	UD	8	2009-10-24	(United States) Kay John Hammonds Center, Joplin, Missouri	
NC	22-7-1	(Mexico) Eloy Suarez	ND	5	2009-08-25	(United States) Remington Park, Oklahoma City, Oklahoma	
Win	22-7-1	(United States) Steve Walker	TKO	3 (6), 0:44	2009-07-25	(United States) Kay Yeager Coliseum, Wichita Falls, Texas	
Win	21-7-1	(United States) Michi Munoz	TKO	10 (12), 1:00	2009-05-07	(United States) Crowne Plaza Hotel, Tulsa, Oklahoma	Won vacant WBC Continental Americas light middleweight title
Win	20-7-1	(United States) Dan Wallace	TKO	4 (6), 1:43	2009-03-28	(United States) Buffalo Run Casino, Miami, Oklahoma	
Win	19-7-1	(United States) Mike McGuire	TKO	2 (6), 2:29	2009-03-12	(United States) First Council Casino, Newkirk, Oklahoma	
Loss	18-7-1	(Mexico) Jesus Soto Karass	UD	10	2009-02-06	(United States) Maywood Activity Center, Maywood, California	
Win	18-6-1	(Dominican Republic) Alexis Division	TKO	3 (8) 1:37	2009-01-16	(United States) Million Dollar Elm Casino, Tulsa, Oklahoma	
Win	17-6-1	(United States) Shaun Hinkle	TKO	2 (4) 0:50	2008-11-24	(United States) Remington Park, Oklahoma City, Oklahoma	
Win	16-6-1	(Mexico) Donovan Castaneda	UD	8 (8)	2008-09-20	(United States) Cox Convention Center, Oklahoma City, Oklahoma	
Win	15-6-1	(United States) John Huskey	TKO	2 (4), 2:35	2008-07-22	(United States) Remington Park, Oklahoma City, Oklahoma	
Win	14-6-1	(United States) Jose Adelaydo Gonzalez	UD	10	2008-04-18	(United States) Buffalo Run Casino, Miami, Oklahoma	
Loss	13-6-1	(United States) Chris Gray	UD	6	2008-01-19	(United States) Emerald Queen Casino, Tacoma, Washington	
Win	13-5-1	(United States) Jose Adelaydo Gonzalez	MD	6	2008-01-04	(United States) Million Dollar Elm Casino, Tulsa, Oklahoma	
Loss	12-5-1	(Mexico) Roberto Garcia	UD	10	2007-06-08	(United States) Livestock Showground, Mercedes, Texas	
Loss	12-4-1	(Mexico) Freddy Hernández	SD	10	2006-10-27	(United States) Feather Falls Casino, Oroville, California	
Loss	12-3-1	(Mexico) Alfonso Gomez	TKO	8 (8), 2:28	2006-08-25	(United States) ARCO Arena, Sacramento, California	
Win	12-2-1	(United States) Justin Flanagan	UD	4	2006-07-21	(United States) Million Dollar Elm Casino, Tulsa, Oklahoma	
Win	11-2-1	(United States) Jeff Carpenter	TKO	3 (4), 1:17	2006-06-15	(United States) Coeur d'Alene Casino, Worley, Idaho	
Win	10-2-1	(United States) Brad Hill	KO	1 (4), 1:48	2006-05-06	(United States) Farmers Market, Oklahoma City, Oklahoma	
Win	9-2-1	(United States) Adam Capo	TKO	3 (6), 2:16	2006-04-26	(United States) Buffalo Run Casino, Miami, Oklahoma	
Loss	8-2-1	(Mexico) Luciano Perez	TKO	6 (8), 2:37	2006-02-17	(United States) Cicero Stadium, Cicero, Illinois	
Win	8-1-1	(United States) Julian Townsend	MD	6	2006-02-02	(United States) Henry Fonda Theater, Los Angeles, California	
Win	7-1-1	(United States) Keon Johnson	UD	6	2005-11-18	(United States) Radisson Star Plaza, Merrillville, Indiana	
Loss	6-1-1	(United States) Favio Medina	UD	6	2005-10-27	(United States) Coeur d'Alene Casino, Worley, Idaho	
Win	6-0-1	(United States) Verdell Smith	UD	4	2005-10-04	(United States) Gaillardia Country Club, Oklahoma City, Oklahoma	
Win	5-0-1	(Mexico) Donovan Castaneda	SD	4	2005-08-02	(United States) Union Station, Kansas City, Missouri	
Win	4-0-1	(United States) Larry Cunningham	TKO	1 (4), 3:00	2005-07-22	(United States) El 2002 Club, Oklahoma City, Oklahoma	
Draw	3-0-1	(United States) Favio Medina	D	4	2005-06-16	(United States) Coeur d'Alene Casino, Worley, Idaho	
NC	3-0	(United States) Kyle Sherman	ND	4	2005-04-15	(United States) El 2002 Club, Oklahoma City, Oklahoma	
Win	3-0	(United States) Steve Vincent	TKO	2	2005-01-13	(United States) Heart of St. Charles Banquet Center, Saint Charles, Missouri	
Win	2-0	(United States) David Molton	TKO	1	2004-12-10	(United States) Centro de Espectaculos El 2002, Oklahoma City, Oklahoma	
Win	1-0	(United States) Sheldon Mosley	TKO	4	2004-10-05	(United States) Gaillardia Country Club, Oklahoma City, Oklahoma	
