= St Agnes' Church, Crumlin =

St Agnes'
- St Agnes' Catholic Church
- Location in Dublin
- 53.31886°N 6.31584°W
- Address: Saint Agnes Road, Dublin 12, Dublin
- Country: Ireland
- Denomination: Roman Catholic

History
- Dedication: Agnes of Rome

Architecture
- Style: Hiberno-Romanesque
- Completed: 1935

Administration
- Archdiocese: Dublin
- Deanery: Cullenswood
- Parish: Crumlin

St Agnes' is a Catholic church in the suburb of Crumlin in Dublin, Ireland. It is in the Roman Catholic parish of Crumlin in the Archdiocese of Dublin. The church, which opened in 1935, is included on the Record of Protected Structures maintained by Dublin City Council.

== History ==
A Catholic church was first built in Crumlin after the Penal era, in 1726, as a chapel of ease to Rathfarnham. Originally part of Rathfarnharm parish, and then Terenure, the parish was constituted (from Terenure) in 1941.

The present parish church, which is dedicated to Saint Agnes and designed in the Hiberno Romanesque style, was opened in 1935. The main nave was built between 1933 and 1935, and the transepts and apse were added in 1942.

The church has undergone renewal and extensions on several occasions, with the sanctuary being rearranged in 1975. In a 16 week period from June 2013, refurbishment and renewal works were completed on the altar podium, artwork, pews and side chapel. Updates were also made to the building's disabled facilities and entrance area.
