= Mark Suárez =

American boxer

Personal information
- Nickname: Poison
- Born: Mark Anthony Suárez; January 8, 1979 (age 47) Riverside, California, U.S.
- Height: 6 ft 1 in (185 cm)
- Weight: Super lightweight Welterweight

Boxing career
- Reach: 74 in (188 cm)
- Stance: Orthodox

Boxing record
- Total fights: 30
- Wins: 25
- Win by KO: 13
- Losses: 5

Mark Anthony Suárez (born January 8, 1979) is an American former professional boxer who challenged for the IBF welterweight title in 2006.

== Amateur career ==
Suárez was trained by his father, Andy Suárez, until his death. During his amateur career, Suárez achieved notable accomplishments, including winning the National Amateur Championship and being a two-time National Golden Gloves champion.

== Professional career ==
In May 2005, Suárez claimed the WBO NABO welterweight title by defeating the previously undefeated Viktor Sydorenko.

=== IBF welterweight title challenge ===
On October 28, 2006, Suárez faced Kermit Cintrón in a bout for the vacant IBF welterweight title, but he was unsuccessful in his challenge.

== Professional boxing record ==
30 fights	25 wins	5 losses
By knockout	13	2
By decision	12	3

No.	Result	Record	Opponent	Type	Round, time	Date	Location	Notes
30	Loss	25–5	(United States) Charles Hatley	TKO	1 (10), 1:40	18 Jan 2014	(United States) Palladium Ballroom, Dallas, Texas, US	
29	Loss	25–4	(Russia) Maxim Vlasov	UD	8	12 Jul 2013	(United States) County Fairgrounds, Ventura, California, US	
28	Loss	25–3	(Puerto Rico) Kermit Cintrón	TKO	6 (12), 2:31	28 Oct 2006	(United States) Convention Center, Palm Beach, Florida, US	For vacant IBF welterweight title
27	Win	25–2	(United States) James Webb	TKO	1 (12), 0:44	7 Jan 2006	(United States) Madison Square Garden, New York City, New York, US	IBF Welterweight Title Eliminator

Sporting positions
Regional boxing titles
Vacant Title last held by Ishe Smith	WBO–NABO welterweight champion May 14, 2005 - December 2005; Vacated	Vacant Title next held by Paul Williams
