= Carlos Adán Jerez =

Argentine boxer

Carlos Adan Jerez
Personal information
- Nickname: El Malevo
- Born: Carlos Adan Jerez; 30 March 1979 (age 47) Los Sarmientos, Tucuman, Argentina
- Height: 6 ft 0 in (184 cm)
- Weight: Middleweight; Light middleweight Welterweight

Boxing career
- Reach: 74 in (189 cm)
- Stance: Orthodox

Boxing record
- Total fights: 73
- Wins: 45
- Win by KO: 18
- Losses: 23
- Draws: 4
- No contests: 1

Carlos Adan Jerez (born 30 March 1979) is an Argentine professional boxer.

== Pro career ==
On September 2, 2008, Jerez lost a 10 round Unanimous Decision to top Welterweight Prospect, Mexican Canelo Álvarez.

On June 30, 2010, Jerez lost a 12 round Unanimous Decision against Anthony Mundine.

=== Professional record ===
44 Wins (18 knockouts), 20 Losses, 3 Draw
Res.	Record	Opponent	Type	Rd., Time	Date	Location	Notes
Win	44-20-3	(Argentina) Fernando Enrique Bataglia	UD	4 (4)	2017-04-28	Club Union San Vicente, Cordoba, Cordoba, Argentina	
Loss	43-20-3	(Australia) Zac Dunn	RTD	5 (10)	2016-07-01	The Melbourne Pavilion, Flemington, Victoria, Australia	
Win	43-19-3	(Argentina) Alberto Gustavo Sanchez	UD	4 (4)	2015-11-06	Club Pucará, Cordoba, Cordoba, Argentina	
Loss	42-19-3	(Mexico) Marco Antonio Periban	TKO	5 (10)	2015-06-27	Centro Civico de Ecatepec, Ecatepec, México, Mexico	
Win	42-18-3	(Argentina) Crispulo Javier Andino	UD	4 (4)	2015-05-23	Club Unión Eléctrica, Cordoba, Cordoba, Argentina	
Win	41-18-3	(Argentina) Osvaldo Leonardo Acuna	UD	6 (6)	2015-02-20	Club Union San Vicente, Cordoba, Cordoba, Argentina	
Loss	40-18-3	(United States Virgin Islands) John Jackson	UD	10 (10)	2014-11-15	Quorum Córdoba Hotel, Cordoba, Cordoba, Argentina	
Win	40-17-3	(Argentina) Alberto Gustavo Sanchez	UD	6 (6)	2014-10-03	Club Facundo, La Rioja, La Rioja, Argentina	
Win	39-17-3	(Argentina) Sergio Daniel Cordoba	UD	4 (4)	2014-09-05	Estadio del Centro, Cordoba, Argentina	
Loss	38-17-3	(Uzbekistan) Sherzod Husanov	UD	12 (12)	2014-02-08	Sport Palace "Uzbekiston", Tashkent, Uzbekistan	
Win	38-16-3	(United States Virgin Islands) Samuel Rogers	UD	10 (10)	2013-12-07	Club Atlético Talleres, Córdoba, Argentina	
Loss	37-16-3	(Ukraine) Vyacheslav Senchenko	TKO	4 (10)	2013-08-24	Donbass Arena, Donetsk, Ukraine	
Win	37-15-3	(Argentina) Miguel Dario Lombardo	TKO	4 (6)	2013-07-12	Sociedad General Belgrano, Cordoba, Argentina	
Win	36-15-3	(Argentina) Pablo Alberto Cortes	UD	6 (6)	2013-02-08	Club Alianza, Jesus Maria, Cordoba, Argentina	
Win	35-15-3	(Argentina) Francisco Nicolas Benitez	UD	4 (4)	2012-12-14	Sociedad General Belgrano, Cordoba, Argentina	
Win	34-15-3	(Argentina) Gustavo Daniel Boggio	UD	6 (6)	2012-11-09	Sociedad General Belgrano, Cordoba, Argentina	
Win	33-15-3	(Argentina) Bernardino Gonzalez	UD	6 (6)	2012-08-17	Sociedad General Belgrano, Cordoba, Argentina	
Loss	32-15-3	(Argentina) Hector Saldivia	UD	10 (10)	2011-10-21	Comodoro Rivadavia, Chubut, Argentina	
Win	32-14-3	(Uruguay) Adan Martinez	UD	6 (6)	2011-07-15	Estadio del Centro, Cordoba, Argentina	
Loss	31-14-3	(Ukraine) Max Bursak	UD	12 (12)	2011-05-28	Concert Hall "Kobzov", Kyiv, Ukraine	For WBO Inter-Continental middleweight title.
Win	31-13-3	(Paraguay) Oscar Rivas Samudio	TKO	3 (6)	2010-09-10	Sociedad General Belgrano, Cordoba, Argentina	
Loss	30-13-3	(Australia) Anthony Mundine	UD	12 (12)	2010-06-30	Brisbane Entertainment Centre, Queensland, Australia	
Loss	30-12-3	(Italy) Leonard Bundu	TD	5 (12)	2010-03-19	Nelson Mandela Forum, Florence, Toscana, Italy	For vacant WBA Inter-Continental welterweight title.
Win	30-11-3	(Argentina) Javier Alberto Mamani	TKO	4 (10)	2009-11-06	Estadio Delmi, Salta, Argentina	
Win	29-11-3	(Argentina) Francisco Nicolas Benitez	UD	6 (6)	2009-09-04	Estadio Delmi, Salta, Argentina	
Win	28-11-3	(Argentina) Raul Elias Rojas	TKO	4 (6)	2009-06-12	Club Huracán, Cordoba, Argentina	
Loss	27-11-3	(Argentina) Lucas Matthysse	UD	10 (10)	2008-12-20	Club Ciclista Juninense, Junín, Buenos Aires, Argentina	
Loss	27-10-3	(Mexico) Canelo Álvarez	UD	10 (10)	2008-08-02	Auditorio Benito Juárez, Zapopan, Jalisco, Mexico	
Win	27-9-3	(Argentina) Amilcar Funes Melian	UD	6 (6)	2008-07-04	Estadio Delmi, Salta, Argentina	
Loss	26-9-3	(Argentina) Javier Alberto Mamani	SD	12 (12)	2008-04-04	Estadio Delmi, Salta, Argentina	For South American light middleweight title
Win	26-8-3	(Argentina) Raul Elias Rojas	KO	5 (6)	2007-12-14	Polideportivo Carlos Cerutti, Cordoba, Argentina	
Win	25-8-3	(Argentina) Rafael Oscar Ferreyra	TKO	4 (6)	2007-10-19	Polideportivo Carlos Cerutti, Cordoba, Argentina	
Win	24-8-3	(Argentina) Raul Elias Rojas	UD	6 (6)	2007-09-14	Club Deportivo Aguilares, Tucuman, Argentina	
Loss	23-8-3	(Argentina) Cesar Cuenca	UD	10 (10)	2007-04-07	Ce.De.M. N° 2, Caseros, Buenos Aires, Argentina	
Loss	23-7-3	(Argentina) Diego Martin Alzugaray	SD	6 (6)	2006-11-25	Club Sportivo Barraca, Armstrong, Santa Fe, Argentina	
Win	23-6-3	(Argentina) Nestor Fabian Sanchez	KO	2 (6)	2006-09-15	Ex Arrocera, Aguilares, Tucuman, Argentina	
NC	22-6-3	(Argentina) Hugo Alfredo Santillan	KO	2 (6)	2006-08-18	Club Atlético Alberdi, Juan Bautista Alberdi, Tucuman, Argentina	
Win	22-6-3	(Argentina) Justo Evangelista Martinez	UD	8 (8)	2006-05-19	Ex Arrocera, Aguilares, Tucuman, Argentina	
Draw	21-6-3	(Argentina) Ruben Dario Oliva	SD	6 (6)	2006-04-01	Club Atletico Union, Santa Fe, Santa Fe, Argentina	
Win	21-6-2	(Argentina) Walter Damian Diaz	KO	8 (12)	2005-07-15	QUIMSA, Santiago Del Estero, Santiago del Estero, Argentina	
Loss	20-6-2	(Argentina) Raul Horacio Balbi	UD	10 (10)	2005-04-30	Estadio Aldo Cantoni, San Juan, San Juan, Argentina	
Loss	20-5-2	(Argentina) Ruben Dario Oliva	SD	6 (6)	2005-03-18	(Argentina) Hotel Cordoba Plaza, Cordoba, Cordoba	
Win	20-4-2	(Argentina) Ruben Dario Oliva	UD	8 (8)	2005-01-14	(Argentina) Club Centenario, Galvez, Santa Fe	
Loss	19-4-2	(Argentina) Walter Matthysse	RTD	8 (12)	2004-10-08	Super Domo Orfeo, Cordoba, Argentina	
Win	19-3-2	(Argentina) Facundo David Tolosa	UD	10 (10)	2004-05-15	Club Ciclista Juninense, Junín, Buenos Aires, Argentina	
Win	18-3-2	(Argentina) Carlos Rene Montiel	TD	5 (6)	2004-03-12	Super Domo Orfeo, Cordoba, Argentina	
Draw	17-3-2	(Argentina) Javier Alberto Mamani	SD	8 (8)	2004-02-13	Ex Salta Club, Salta, Salta, Argentina	
Loss	17-3-1	(Argentina) Javier Alejandro Blanco	DQ	6 (8)	2003-12-12	Santa Rosa, La Pampa, Argentina	
Win	17-2-1	(Argentina) Alfredo Ramon Comaschi	UD	4 (4)	2003-11-12	Aguilares, Tucuman, Argentina	
Win	16-2-1	(Argentina) Carlos Wilfredo Vilches	TD	4 (12)	2003-10-25	Club de Regatas, Corrientes, Corrientes, Argentina	
Draw	15-2-1	(Argentina) Sergio Gaston Finetto	SD	6 (6)	2003-09-26	Club Ciclista Juninense, Junín, Buenos Aires, Argentina	
Win	15-2	(Argentina) Marcelo Leandro Gutierrez	UD	6 (6)	2003-09-12	Estadio San Lorenzo, La Rioja, La Rioja, Argentina	
Loss	14-2	(Argentina) Sebastian Andres Lujan	KO	7 (12)	2003-06-14	Estadio Republica de Venezuela, Bolívar, Buenos Aires, Argentina	
