= Crumlin, Dublin =

Suburb of Dublin, Ireland

Crumlin Cromghlinn (Irish)
- Suburb
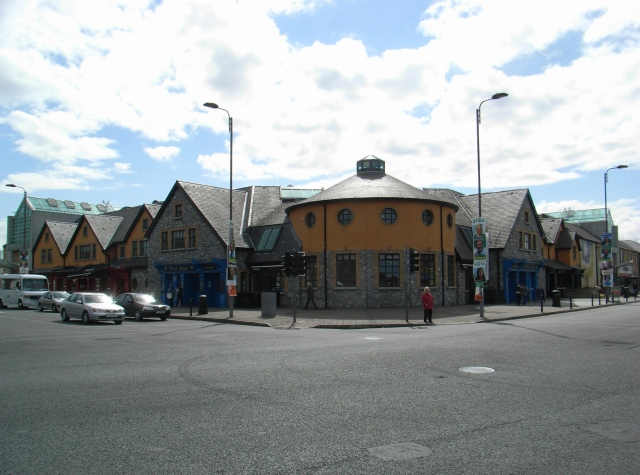
- The Submarine Bar, Crumlin

- Location in Dublin Location in Ireland
- Coordinates: 53°19′22″N 6°18′54″W
- Country: Ireland
- Province: Leinster
- County: County Dublin
- City: Dublin

Government
  - Dáil constituency: Dublin South-Central
  - Local authority: Dublin City Council
- Eircode routing key: D12

Crumlin (Irish: Croimghlinn, meaning 'Crooked Glen') is a Southside suburb of Dublin, Ireland. Formerly a rural area, it became heavily built up from the early 20th century onwards. Crumlin is the site of Ireland's largest children's hospital, Our Lady's Children's Hospital.

The population of all electoral divisions labelled as Crumlin was 19,287 as of the 2022 census. Crumlin is in a townland and civil parish of the same name.

== Location ==
Crumlin covers the area from the Stannaway road near the KCR (Kimmage Cross Roads) to Sundrive Road and Crumlin Cross at the Ashleaf Shopping Centre to Crumlin's village core and the Drimnagh Road, to Bunting Road, Crumlin Road then along the Grand Canal from Rialto Bridge to Sally's Bridge. It is situated near to the city centre, on the Southside of Dublin city. Neighbouring areas include Walkinstown, Perrystown, Drimnagh, Terenure, and Kimmage. Crumlin is contained within postal district Dublin 12.

== Name ==
Crumlin gets its name from the "crooked valley" known as Lansdowne Valley. The valley was formed by glacial erosion in the distant past and is now bisected by the River Camac. The valley is situated in front of Drimnagh.

== History ==
During the medieval period, Dublin was surrounded by manorial settlements, each comprising a manor house, church and graveyard, farmland and cottages. These settlements grew into a network of villages around Dublin, creating stability and continuity of location. Crumlin village developed as an Anglo-Norman settlement soon after the Norman Conquest in 1170 (although the circular configuration of the old graveyard of Saint Mary's in the village suggests pre-Norman associations), and has survived through the centuries to become the village of today. The Old Saint Mary's Church stands on the site of a 12th-century church of the same dedication, and a succession of churches occupied the site down through the centuries to the present day. In 1193, John, Lord of Ireland, gave the Crumlin church to form one prebend for the collegiate church of Saint Patrick. When the main body of the present old church was rebuilt in 1817, the old tower of much earlier origin was preserved.

Crumlin, along with Saggart, Newcastle, Lyons and Esker (Lucan), was constituted a royal manor by King John sometime before the end of his reign in 1216. The English noble families of the time had strong links with Ireland, particularly in Leinster. For example, William Fitz John of Harptree was a lord of some significance in Somerset and likely to have served in Ireland under King John. At the beginning of the reign of King Henry III, Fitz John acquired the custody of the lands of William de Carew and held the royal manor of Crumlin, although he did not establish family roots in Ireland.

From 1609 until the 19th century, Edmund Purcell and then the Purcell family leased land in Crumlin. John Brice, Mayor of Dublin in 1605, lived in Crumlin.

=== 18th century ===
Crumlin House was said to have been constructed by Joseph Deane in the area in the early 18th century incorporating elements of an earlier manor house. The house was later owned by members of the Purcell family. It still stands as of 2023 incorporated into the structure of the Salesian provincial house.

=== 19th century ===
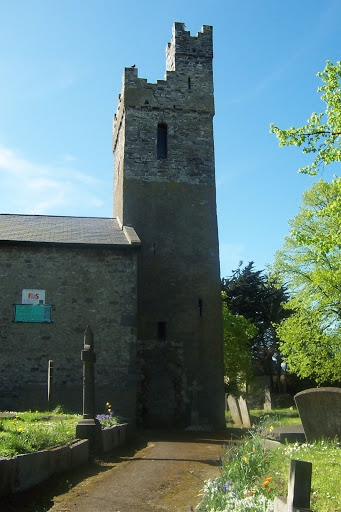
St. Mary's Church, Crumlin Village, Dublin – South East View.

During the 19th century, Crumlin was the centre for the production of bricks used in urban development around Dublin. The site at Brickfields Park contained yellow clay suitable for bricks. The common of Crumlin was used for annual horse race meetings. The common was also used for hurling matches, until it was enclosed by an Act of Parliament in 1818.

=== 20th century ===
Some of the local amenities in Crumlin, such as Pearse College on Clogher Road and Ceannt park, are named after some of the 1916 Rebels who had a training camp in nearby Kimmage at Sundrive crossroads.

Having been predominantly rural, the character of Crumlin changed dramatically from the 1920s onwards. The Corporation of Dublin built 702 new houses around this time to resolve overcrowding in the city centre, along with Iveagh Trust, who built 136 houses on a 30 acres (12 ha) site off Crumlin Road. In 1935, a further 2,915 properties were constructed after the corporation had been given additional compulsory purchase powers, following by a further 2,416 in a site off Kildare Road by 1945. Previous to the development by the corporation, Sundrive Road was a country byway known as "the Dark Lanes".

The old church of St Mary the Virgin stands on a site of a 12th-century property. In 1942, following the rapid housing development, it moved to a new site designed by McDonnell and Dixon in yellow brick. The other local church is St Agnes's, which opened in 1935.

== Features ==
Crumlin is home to Our Lady's Children's Hospital, Crumlin, the largest children's hospital in the country, which opened in 1956.

A number of roads are named after some of Ulster's towns and various Irish towns associated with pagan or religious sites/towns. There is a statue of the warrior Cúchulainn situated opposite St. Mary's Church at the junction with Bunting Road. The statue is for Oisín, a Kildare man who played hurling in the Crumlin area. Cúchulainn, his father, was from the Cooley mountains around Louth, South Armagh where the Cooley Road in Drimnagh gets its name.

== Schools ==
Schools serving the area include Loreto College, Rosary College, Scoil Úna Naofa (previously St. Agnes NS), Marist National School, Our Lady Queen of Hope. St. Kevin's College, and Scoil Íosagáin.

== Transport ==
Dublin Bus routes which serve the Crumlin area include route numbers 27, 56A, 74, 77A, 77N (Nitelink), 77X, 82, 122, 150, 151 and F3. Go-Ahead Ireland Commuter Route 125 to Naas stops outside Crumlin Hospital and Go Ahead Ireland routes S4 from Liffey Valley to UCD and 73 from Marino to Walkinstown also serve Crumlin.

== Sport ==
GAA clubs in the area include Crumlin GAA (based in Pearse Park, with its clubrooms in O'Toole Park), Kevin's GAA (based in Dolphin Park) and Templeogue Synge Street GAA (based in Dolphin Park, with clubrooms in Bushy Park). St James Gaels, another GAA club in the area, play their home games at the Iveagh Grounds. Guinness Rugby Football Club is also based at the Iveagh Grounds.

Local Association football (soccer) clubs include Crumlin United F.C., St James's Gate F.C., and Lourdes Celtic FC. The latter is a junior football team from the Sundrive area, which plays in the Leinster Junior Leagues. Damien Duff and Andy Reid formerly played for the club.

Crumlin Boxing Club is based in Windmill road and produced Dean Byrne. Crumlin Bowling Club is based on St.Mary's Road and was originally part of the Imperial Tobacco Company from 1926 to 1947.

Main Stage Wrestling Academy, based on Sundrive Road, is a professional wrestling school.

== In popular culture ==
The medieval story of the Abbot of Drimnagh was set in Drimnagh and Crumlin.

When the RTÉ drama Fair City launched in 1989, exterior shots were filmed in the Crumlin and Drimnagh area for the first three seasons of the programme.

== Notable people ==
Notable people who have lived in or been associated with the area include:

- Brendan Behan, writer who lived at 70 Kildare Road which is marked with a plaque.
- Christy Brown, writer born in Crumlin.
- Dean Byrne, light welterweight boxer, born in Crumlin.
- Gabriel Byrne, actor, born in Crumlin.
- Martin Cahill, prominent criminal who lived in Crumlin.
- Paddy Casey, singer/songwriter from Cashel Road in Crumlin.
- Gemma Craven, actress from Crumlin.
- Joseph Deane, politician, judge, Chief Baron of the Irish Exchequer, and owner of the Crumlin estate, born in Crumlin.
- Martin Duffy, filmmaker and author from Leighlin Road, Crumlin.
- Richie Egan, professional musician from Crumlin.
- Seamus Elliott, professional competitive cyclist.
- Jazzy (or Yasmine Bryne), pop and dance music singer.
- Henry Mitchell Jones, recipient of the Victoria Cross.
- Liam Lawlor, controversial teachta dála, born in Crumlin.
- Phil Lynott of rock group Thin Lizzy lived on Leighlin Road, Crumlin. A plaque was erected at the family home in 2020.
- Paul McGrath, footballer who grew up in Crumlin.
- Conor McGregor, mixed martial artist and former UFC champion in the Featherweight and Lightweight division.
- Rick O'Shea, RTÉ broadcaster, grew up in Crumlin.
- Fintan O'Toole, journalist and Irish Times assistant editor, grew up in Crumlin.
- Noel Pearson, theatrical and film producer from Crumlin.
- Andy Reid, former professional footballer grew up on Clogher Road.
- Eamonn Rogers, former professional footballer.
- Pico Lopes, professional footballer. Shamrock Rovers and Cape Verde World Cup player

== See also ==
- List of towns and villages in the Republic of Ireland
- St Agnes' Church, Crumlin
