= Hector Saldivia =

Argentine boxer

Personal information
- Nickname: El Tigre
- Born: Hector David Saldivia; March 2, 1984 (age 42) Chubut, Argentina
- Height: 5 ft 9 in (1.75 m)
- Weight: Super welterweight

Boxing career
- Reach: 69 in (175 cm)
- Stance: Orthodox

Boxing record
- Total fights: 51
- Wins: 46
- Win by KO: 35
- Losses: 5
- Draws: 0
- No contests: 0

Hector David Saldivia (born March 2, 1984) is an Argentine professional boxer.

== Professional career ==
On 27 March 2009, Hector won the World Boxing Association Fedelatin welterweight title after defeating Daudy Bahari in the first round via three knockdown rule.

=== Saldivia vs Said Oualik ===
On 2010, May 1, Saldivia loss his fight against Said Ouali in a World Boxing Association welterweight title eliminator by TKO in the first round.

=== "This Is It" vs Kell Brook ===
On 20 October 2012, Hector fought against Kell Brook, the winner would then become the mandatory challenger for the IBF welterweight world title held at the time by Randall Bailey. At a packed weigh in the day before the fight at Sheffield's Meadowhall Centre both fighters weighed in under the 147 lbs limit. Brook started strongly knocking Saldivia down midway through the first round. The second round was very similar with Saldivia unable to deal with Brook's superior accuracy and power. In the third Brook landed a solid well timed straight which sent the Argentinian to the floor again. This time he struggled to get up as his legs wobbled beneath him and the referee stopped the contest in the third round.

=== Saldivia vs Lujan ===
On 2015, February 18, Saldivia won the interim WBC Latino super welterweight title after defeating Sebastian Lujan on a Unanimous decision.

=== Saldivia vs Villalba ===
On 2017, August 26, Saldivia loses the Argentine scepter (Fab) by disqualification Ricardo Ruben Villalba stays with his title (OMB) and wins the Argentine center (FAB) super welter

== Professional boxing record ==
46 wins (35 knockouts), 5 losses, 0 draws
Res.	Record	Opponent	Type	Rd., Time	Date	Location	Notes
Loss	46–5	(Argentina) Ricardo Ruben Villalba	DP	8 (10)	2017-08-26	Micro estadio municipal, Hurligham, Buenos Aires, Argentina	Lost Argentina (FAB) Super Welterweight Title
Win	46–4	(Argentina) Guido Nicolas Pitto	SD	10 (10)	2017-03-04	Club Social y Cultural El Cruce, Malvinas Argentinas, Buenos Aires, Argentina	
Loss	45–4	(France) Michel Soro	TKO	3 (12)	2016-07-30	La Palestre, Le Cannet, Alpes-Maritimes, France	
Win	45–3	(Argentina) Jose Carlos Paz	TKO	4 (10)	2016-03-18	Estadio Socios Fundadores, Comodoro Rivadavia, Chubut, Argentina	
Win	44–3	(Argentina) Sebastian Andres Lujan	KO	2 (10)	2015-04-10	Club 9 de Julio, Lanús Oeste, Buenos Aires, Argentina	Won vacant IBF Latino middleweight title
Win	43–3	(Argentina) Sebastian Andres Lujan	UD	10 (10)	2015-02-18	(Argentina) Estadio Socios Fundadores, Comodoro Rivadavia, Chubut	Won interim WBC Latino super welterweight title
Win	42–3	(Argentina) Juan Jose Dias	KO	3 (6)	2014-12-20	(Argentina) Estadio Socios Fundadores, Comodoro Rivadavia, Chubut	
Loss	41–3	(United Kingdom) Kell Brook	TKO	3 (12)	2012-10-20	(United Kingdom) Motorpoint Arena, Sheffield, Yorkshire	
Win	41–2	(Mexico) Jonathan Duran	UD	10 (10)	2012-02-25	(Argentina) Estadio Ingeniero Huergo, Comodoro Rivadavia, Chubut	
Win	40–2	(Argentina) Carlos Adan Jerez	UD	10 (10)	2011-10-21	Comodoro Rivadavia, Chubut, Argentina	
Win	39–2	(Colombia) Emilio Julio Julio	KO	5 (10)	2011-08-06	(Argentina) Estadio Socios Fundadores, Comodoro Rivadavia, Chubut	
Win	38–2	(Brazil) Carmelito De Jesus	KO	2 (6)	2011-06-11	Luna Park, Buenos Aires, Distrito Federal, Argentina	
Win	37–2	(Uruguay) Nestor Faccio	TKO	4 (10)	2011-04-02	(Argentina) Estadio Socios Fundadores, Comodoro Rivadavia, Chubut	
Win	36–2	(Argentina) Jorge Daniel Miranda	RTD	5 (10)	2010-12-10	(Argentina) Estadio Socios Fundadores, Comodoro Rivadavia, Chubut	
Win	35–2	(Brazil) Jailton De Jesus Souza	TKO	3 (10)	2010-10-01	Club de Regatas, Corrientes, Corrientes, Argentina	
Win	34–2	(Argentina) Diego Martin Alzugaray	TKO	3 (10)	2010-08-13	Club Atletico Union, Santa Fe, Santa Fe, Argentina	
Loss	33–2	(Belgium) Said Ouali	TKO	1 (10)	2010-05-01	(United States) MGM Grand, Las Vegas, Nevada, USA	
Win	33-1	(Mexico) Ricardo Cano	TKO	4 (10)	2010-01-30	Club Atletico Racing, Trelew, Chubut, Argentina	
Win	32-1	(Argentina) Omar Gabriel Weis	TKO	8 (10)	2009-12-11	Caleta Olivia, Santa Cruz, Argentina	
Win	31-1	(Mexico) Luis Rodriguez	TKO	7 (10)	2009-10-31	Estadio Municipal, Comodoro Rivadavia, Chubut, Argentina	
Win	30-1	(Colombia) William Morelo	UD	10 (10)	2009-05-16	Palacio Peñarol, Montevideo, Uruguay	
Win	29-1	(Indonesia) Daudy Bahari	TKO	1 (10)	2009-03-27	(United States Virgin Islands) UVI Sports & Fitness Center, Charlotte Amalie, U.S. Virgin Islands	
Win	28-1	(Argentina) Juan Manuel Alaggio	TKO	1 (10)	2008-12-05	Complejo Ingenierio Knudsen, Caleta Olivia, Santa Cruz, Argentina	
Win	27-1	(Colombia) Jaison Palomeque	KO	3 (11)	2008-08-22	(Argentina) Estadio Socios Fundadores, Comodoro Rivadavia, Chubut	Won vacant WBA Fedelatin welterweight title
Win	26-1	(Argentina) Daniel Montenegro	RTD	3 (10)	2008-06-20	(Argentina) Parque Central, Neuquen, Neuquen	
Win	25-1	(Argentina) Jorge Daniel Miranda	KO	1 (10)	2008-03-07	(Argentina) Estadio Socios Fundadores, Comodoro Rivadavia, Chubut	
Win	24-1	(Argentina) Nelson Velazco	RTD	2 (10)	2007-12-21	(Argentina) Estadio Socios Fundadores, Comodoro Rivadavia, Chubut	
Win	23-1	(Argentina) Daniel Montenegro	UD	10 (10)	2007-11-09	(Argentina) Estadio Socios Fundadores, Comodoro Rivadavia, Chubut	
Win	22-1	(Argentina) Adolfo Dionisio Rios	KO	3 (8)	2007-09-14	(Argentina) Club Independiente, Neuquen, Neuquen	
Loss	21-1	(Argentina) Jorge Daniel Miranda	TKO	5 (12)	2007-04-21	Luna Park, Buenos Aires, Distrito Federal, Argentina	Loss WBO Latino welterweight title
Win	21-0	(Argentina) Amilcar Edgardo Funes Melian	RTD	4 (12)	2007-02-21	(Argentina) Estadio Socios Fundadores, Comodoro Rivadavia, Chubut	Won vacant WBO Latino welterweight title
Win	20-0	(Argentina) Omar Gabriel Weis	TKO	5 (10)	2006-10-21	Club Ciclista Juninense, Junín, Buenos Aires, Argentina	
Win	19-0	(Argentina) Raul Eduardo Bejarano	UD	10	2006-07-14	(Argentina) Estadio Socios Fundadores, Comodoro Rivadavia, Chubut	
Win	18-0	(Colombia) Dionisio Miranda	KO	7 (10)	2006-05-05	Club Ciclista Juninense, Junín, Buenos Aires, Argentina	
Win	17-0	(Chile) Carlos Uribe	KO	4 (10)	2006-02-17	Gimnasio Municipal Nº 1, Comodoro Rivadavia, Chubut, Argentina	
Win	16-0	(Argentina) Sergio Gaston Finetto	TKO	9 (12)	2005-11-25	Estadio Socios Fundadores, Comodoro Rivadavia, Chubut, Argentina	
Win	15-0	(Argentina) Norberto Adrian Acosta	TKO	2 (8)	2005-11-25	Club Atletico Newell's Old Boys, Rosario, Santa Fe, Argentina	
Win	14-0	(Argentina) Norberto Adrian Acosta	KO	2 (10)	2005-09-16	Gimnasio Municipal, Comodoro Rivadavia, Chubut, Argentina	
Win	13-0	(Argentina) Oscar Daniel Veliz	KO	3 (10)	2005-08-19	Gimnasio Municipal, Comodoro Rivadavia, Chubut, Argentina	
Win	12-0	(Argentina) Walter Fabian Saporiti	TKO	2 (10)	2005-07-15	Gimnasio Municipal, Comodoro Rivadavia, Chubut, Argentina	
Win	11-0	(Argentina) Mario Alberto Lopez	TKO	2 (10)	2005-06-03	Gimnasio Municipal, Comodoro Rivadavia, Chubut, Argentina	
Win	10-0	(Argentina) Ruben Dario Oliva	KO	6 (8)	2005-05-06	Gimnasio Municipal, Comodoro Rivadavia, Chubut, Argentina	
