= Walter Matthysse =

Argentine boxer

Personal information
- Nickname: El Terrible
- Born: August 29, 1978 (age 47) Esperanza, Santa Fé, Argentina
- Weight: Welterweight; Light middleweight

Boxing career
- Stance: Orthodox

Boxing record
- Total fights: 32
- Wins: 26
- Win by KO: 25
- Losses: 5
- No contests: 1

Walter Dario Matthysse Sr. (born August 29, 1978) is an Argentine former professional boxer who competed from 2002 to 2009. He challenged for the IBF welterweight title in 2007 and at regional level held the WBO Latino welterweight title three times between 2004 and 2006. He is the older brother of former featherweight world champion, Edith Soledad Matthysse, and welterweight world champion of boxing, Lucas Matthysse.

== Professional career ==
On July 14, 2007, Kermit Cintrón was dominant in his first title defense, knocking down the Argentine Matthysse three times on his way to a knockout victory twenty-nine seconds into the second round. Prior to this match, Matthysse had never been knocked down by any opponent, although he had suffered a tenth-round technical knockout loss in May 2006 at the hands of Paul Williams (the Cintrón-Matthysse bout was the main undercard fight of a WBO title bout between challenger Williams and incumbent Antonio Margarito).

== Professional record ==
26 wins (25 knockouts), 5 losses (5 knockouts), 0 draws, 1 no contest
Res.	Record	Opponent	Type	Rd., Time	Date	Location	Notes
Loss	26–5 (1)	(Argentina) Oscar Daniel Veliz	TKO	5 (6), 0:15	2009-06-06	(Argentina) Gimnasio Municipal Nº 1, Trelew, Chubut	
Loss	26–4 (1)	(Republic of the Congo) Alex Bunema	KO	6 (12)	2008-07-11	Uniprix Stadium, Montreal, Quebec, Canada	For WBA Inter-Continental light middleweight title.
Loss	26–3 (1)	(Argentina) Sebastian Andres Lujan	TKO	10 (12)	2007-10-19	Club Atletico Newell's Old Boys, Santa Fe, Argentina	
Loss	26–2 (1)	(Puerto Rico) Kermit Cintron	KO	2 (12), 0:29	14 Jul 2007	(United States) Boardwalk Hall, Atlantic City, New Jersey	For IBF welterweight title.
Win	26–1 (1)	(Argentina) Jorge Dario David Gomez	TKO	2 (10)	2006-10-20	(Argentina) Gimnasio Municipal Nº 1, Trelew, Chubut	
Loss	25–1 (1)	(United States) Paul Williams	TKO	10 (12), 1:56	2006-05-27	(United States) The Home Depot Center, Carson, California	For vacant WBO NABO welterweight title.
Win	25–0 (1)	(Argentina) Juan Carlos Alderete	TKO	1 (12)	2006-04-01	Club Atletico Union, Santa Fe, Santa Fe, Argentina	Retained WBO Latino welterweight title.
Win	24–0 (1)	(United States) Xavier Toliver	KO	1 (10)	2005-12-08	(United States) 4th and B, San Diego, California, USA	Won WBC FECARBOX welterweight title.
NC	23–0 (1)	(Argentina) Roberto Hernan Reuque	NC	2	2005-10-22	Club Atletico Newell's Old Boys, Santa Fe, Argentina	Retained WBO Latino welterweight title.
Win	23–0	(Argentina) Juan Italo Meza	KO	6 (8)	2005-09-10	(Argentina) Gimnasio Municipal Nº 1, Trelew, Chubut	
Win	22–0	(Argentina) Juan Carlos Villagra	KO	8 (10)	2005-05-20	Gimnasio Municipal, Puerto Madryn, Chubut, Argentina	
Win	21–0	(Colombia) Raul Martinez	TKO	1 (12)	2005-03-11	Club Ciclista Juninense, Junín, Buenos Aires, Argentina	Won WBC Mundo Hispano light middleweight title.
Win	20–0	(Argentina) Silvio Walter Rojas	TKO	2 (10)	2004-12-03	Super Domo Orfeo, Cordoba, Argentina	
Win	19–0	(Argentina) Carlos Adan Jerez	RTD	8 (12)	2004-10-08	Super Domo Orfeo, Cordoba, Argentina	Retained WBO Latino welterweight title.
Win	18–0	(Argentina) Facundo David Tolosa	KO	2 (10)	2004-09-03	Estadio Socios Fundadores, Chubut, Argentina	
Win	17–0	(Argentina) Hector Ignacio Avila	RTD	2 (10)	2004-08-06	Club Ciclista Juninense, Junín, Buenos Aires, Argentina	
Win	16–0	(Argentina) Ruben Dario Oliva	TKO	2 (12)	2004-06-04	Gimnasio Municipal Nº 1, Trelew, Chubut, Argentina	Retained WBO Latino welterweight title.
Win	15–0	(Argentina) Jorge Dario David Gomez	TKO	2 (10)	2004-04-17	Club Atletico Union, Santa Fe, Santa Fe, Argentina	
Win	14–0	(Argentina) Javier Alejandro Blanco	TKO	2 (12)	2004-03-20	Club Ciclista Juninense, Junín, Buenos Aires, Argentina	
Win	13–0	(Argentina) Marcos Carlos Alegre	TKO	1 (8)	2004-01-16	Trelew, Chubut, Argentina	
Win	12–0	(Argentina) Lorenzo Marquez	RTD	3 (8)	2003-11-14	Club Ciclista Juninense, Junín, Buenos Aires, Argentina	
Win	11–0	(Argentina) Carlos Ignacio Molinas	KO	3 (8)	2003-10-10	Club Ciclista Juninense, Junín, Buenos Aires, Argentina	
Win	10–0	(Argentina) Eduardo Jesus Oscar Rojas	TKO	3 (6)	2003-08-22	Club Ciclista Juninense, Junín, Buenos Aires, Argentina	
