= Said Ouali =

Belgian boxer

Said Ouali (born May 24, 1979, in Agadir, Morocco) is a Belgian professional boxer at welterweight. His nicknames include "Prince", "The Crowd Pleaser" and "The Maaseik Sledgehammer" (Dutch: "De Moker van Maaseik").

== Early life ==
Ouali was born in the Moroccan city of Agadir, but his family moved to Belgium when he was only a few months old. Said and his niffauws ended up in the city of Maaseik, where Said and his brother Mohammed were educated in a strict Catholic school. At the age of fourteen he ended up in the local boxing circuit, where he would also meet his current girlfriend of 14 years, An Colson. They also have a son, called Benjamin.

== Early career ==
Not seeing any future in his Belgian boxing career, the then 20-year-old Said decided to take up boxing in the United States. In April 2000 he arrived at Newark, New Jersey, where he started the first phase of his American boxing career. As an amateur, he racked up an impressive 80-3 record (56 KO) in 83 bouts.

== Professional career ==
Ouali fought his first professional bout on November 24, 2000. He then enlisted with Mayweather Promotions, the most prestigious boxing academy in the States, located in Las Vegas, Nevada. His current record is 27-3 (19 KO). Ouali has claimed in an interview that his most prestigious victory was that against Argentine boxer Hector Saldivia, who saw his 33-0 flawless win streak brought to an abrupt end.

== Versus Bailey ==
The most highly publicized fight in Ouali's career was the December 12, 2010 bout against Randall Bailey. The fight ended in a second round no-contest when Ouali was thrown out of the ring by Bailey after taking some critical shots to the body and the fight could not continue.

== Professional boxing record ==
29 wins (21 knockouts), 5 losses
Res.	Record	Opponent	Type	Rd., Time	Date	Location	Notes
Loss	29-5	(United States) Grady Brewer	UD	6)	2014-09-27	(United States) OKC Downtown Airpark, Oklahoma City, Oklahoma, USA	
Win	29-4	(United States) Bryan Abraham	KO	2 (6)	2013-07-06	(United States) Davis Conference Center, Leyton, Utah, USA	
Loss	28-4	(United States) Carson Jones	RTD	7 (10)	2011-09-17	(United States) MGM Grand, Las Vegas, Nevada, USA	
Win	28-3	(United States) Dumont Welliver	TKO	3 (8)	2011-05-27	(United States) St. Paul Armory, Saint Paul, Minnesota, USA	
NC	27-3	(United States) Randall Bailey	ND	2 (12)	2010-12-10	Mickey Mouse Arena, Merksem, Antwerpen, Belgium	
Win	27-3	(Argentina) Hector Saldivia	TKO	1 (10)	2010-05-01	(United States) MGM Grand, Las Vegas, Nevada, USA	
