= Amir Khan (boxer) =

British boxer (born 1986)

Amir Khan PP
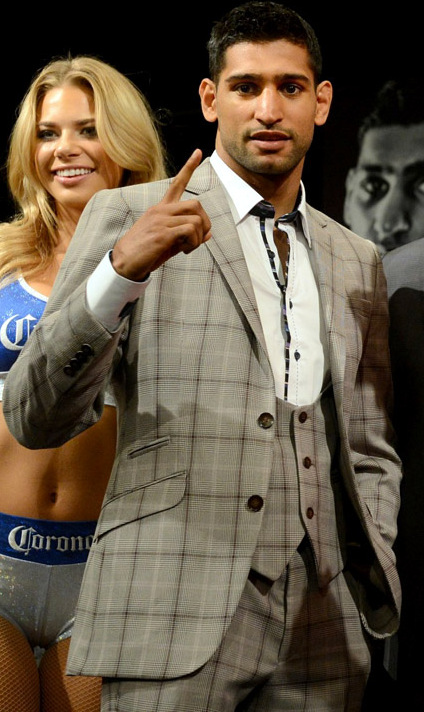
- Khan in 2014

Personal information
- Nickname: King
- Born: Amir Iqbal Khan; 8 December 1986 (age 39) Bolton, Greater Manchester, England
- Height: 5 ft 8 1/2 in (174 cm)
- Weight: Lightweight; Light-welterweight; Welterweight; Middleweight

Boxing career
- Reach: 71 in (180 cm)
- Stance: Orthodox

Boxing record
- Total fights: 40
- Wins: 34
- Win by KO: 21
- Losses: 6
Medal record
Men's amateur boxing
Representing Great Britain
Olympic Games
| Silver medal – second place | 2004 Athens | Lightweight |
Junior Olympic Games
| Gold medal – first place | 2003 | Lightweight |
European Student Championships
| Gold medal – first place | 2004 | Lightweight |
World Junior Championships
| Gold medal – first place | 2004 Jeju | Lightweight |

Amir Iqbal Khan PP (born 8 December 1986) is a British former professional boxer who competed from 2005 to 2022. Born and raised in Bolton, Khan began to box competitively at the age of 11. He rose to fame during the 2004 Summer Olympics, where he won a silver medal in the lightweight division and became, at the age of 17, Britain's youngest boxing Olympic medalist. He turned professional in 2005. In 2007, he was named ESPN prospect of the year. He later became one of the youngest ever British professional world champions, winning the World Boxing Association (WBA) title at the age of 22.

Khan won the Commonwealth lightweight title in 2007. His first professional loss came against Breidis Prescott a year later, where he lost the WBO Inter-Continental lightweight title in one of the biggest upsets in British boxing history. His next three fights saw him win the vacant WBA International lightweight title, the vacant WBO Inter-Continental lightweight title, and the WBA light-welterweight title. He made his US debut against Paulie Malignaggi in May 2010, which he won via TKO. In 2011, he won the IBF light-welterweight title when he beat Zab Judah via KO in the fifth round. In July 2012, he lost the WBA (Super) light-welterweight title against Danny Garcia. Later that year, he won the vacant WBC Silver interim light-welterweight title when he beat Carlos Molina via RTD. In 2014, he beat Luis Collazo for the WBA International and vacant WBC Silver welterweight titles. Between 2016 and 2019, Khan challenged for the WBC, The Ring middleweight titles and the WBO welterweight title. In July 2019, he won the vacant WBC International welterweight title when he beat Billy Dib via TKO in the fourth round.

Known for his hand speed and accuracy, Khan is regarded as one of the most successful British boxers of all time. He is credited with popularising boxing amongst British Pakistanis and British Asians, as well as inspiring South Asian involvement in all aspects of British boxing. Outside of boxing, he is a philanthropist with his own charity organisation, Amir Khan Foundation. He is also a promoter and sponsor, the owner of Khan Promotions and Pakistan's Amir Khan Academy, and a co-owner of India's Super Fight League (MMA) and Super Boxing League. As a celebrity, he has participated in several reality television and game shows. In 2017, he appeared on the seventeenth series of I'm a Celebrity... Get Me Out of Here!. In 2023, he appeared in the inaugural series of I'm a Celebrity... South Africa.

== Early life ==
Khan was born and raised in Bolton, Greater Manchester, to a Pakistani Punjabi Rajput family with roots in Matore village of Kahuta Tehsil, located in Rawalpindi District of Punjab, Pakistan. He was educated at Smithills School in Bolton, and Bolton Community College. Khan is a Muslim, and a member of the Naqshbandi Sufi Order, along with being an active supporter of the Muslim Writers Awards.

Khan has two sisters and one brother, Haroon "Harry" Khan, also a professional boxer. He is the first cousin of English cricketer Sajid Mahmood, related through a paternal grandfather, Lal Khan Janjua, who moved to England after being discharged from the Pakistan Army.

== Amateur boxing career ==
Khan began to box competitively at the age of 11, with early honours including three English school titles, three junior ABA titles, and gold at the 2003 Junior Olympics. In early 2004 he won a gold medal at the European Student Championships in Lithuania, and in South Korea several months later he won a world junior lightweight title after fighting five times in seven days. One of his notable early amateur fights was against Victor Ortíz, whom he defeated in a second round stoppage. Overall, he compiled an amateur record of 101–9.

=== 2004 Olympics ===
Khan qualified for the 2004 Summer Olympics by finishing in first place at the 1st AIBA European 2004 Olympic Qualifying Tournament in Plovdiv, Bulgaria. He was Britain's sole representative in boxing at the Athens Games, winning a silver medal at the age of 17 in the lightweight boxing category. He was Britain's youngest Olympic boxer since Colin Jones in 1976. He lost in the final to Mario Kindelán, the Cuban who had also beaten him several months earlier in the pre-Olympic match-ups in Greece. In 2005, he avenged the two losses by beating the 34-year-old Kindelan in his last amateur fight.

His Olympic fights drew an audience of nearly 8 million viewers on BBC, including 8 million viewers watching his final Olympic match with Kindelan. His 2005 rematch with Kindelan drew an audience of 6.3 million viewers on ITV.

=== Highlights ===
- 2003 – Won a gold medal at the AAU Junior Olympic Games.
- 2004 – Won a gold medal at the European Student Championships and the World Junior Championships.
- 2004 – Won the Strandja Cup to qualify for the Olympics in Athens
- 2004 – Won an amateur match against Victor Ortíz, who was stopped in the second round.
- 2004 – Won a silver medal at the Olympics, beating Marios Kaperonis, Dimitar Shtilianov, Jong Sub Baik and Serik Yeleuov. He lost to Mario Kindelán in the final.
- 2005 – Beat Craig Watson on points in the ABA Championships.
- 2005 – Won the last match of his amateur career beating Mario Kindelan 19–13 at the Reebok Stadium.

== Professional boxing career ==
=== Lightweight ===
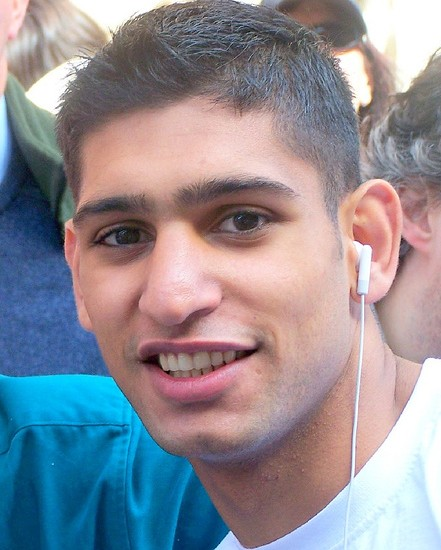
Khan in 2007

==== Early career ====
He made his professional debut against David Bailey in July 2005. The fight drew an audience of 4.4 million viewers, which was ITV's best Saturday night viewing figures of the month. By 2006, his fights were averaging between 6 million and 7 million viewers on ITV.

Khan won his first regional title on 14 July 2007, beating Willie Limond at The O2 Arena to become Commonwealth lightweight champion. Khan was floored in the sixth round, but recovered to score a knock down in the following round. Limond was retired by his corner at the end of round eight due to a broken nose and suspected jaw damage.

On 2 February 2008, Khan was scheduled to fight Martin Kristjansen, but illness forced the Dane to withdraw. Instead, Khan had to defend his Commonwealth title against late replacement Gairy St. Clair at the ExCel Arena, London. It was his first fight to last all twelve rounds and he won via a unanimous decision, with shutout scores of 120–108 from all three judges.

On 5 April 2008, Khan beat Kristjansen, dropping him three times in the seventh round to force a technical knockout (TKO) stoppage. Following the victory, Khan was made number one contender for the WBO lightweight title.

Following the fight, Khan split from his trainer Oliver Harrison, the trainer for all of his previous 17 professional contests. The break-up was blamed on Harrison's concerns that Khan's public engagements were interfering with his fight preparations. Dean Powell, who has trained former world champions Duke McKenzie and Lloyd Honeyghan, worked with Khan until a decision on a permanent trainer was made. In the same month, Khan had a training session in Las Vegas with Roger Mayweather, trainer and uncle of Floyd Mayweather Jr.

Khan fought on 21 June 2008, at the National Indoor Arena in Birmingham against Irishman Michael Gomez, a former WBU super-featherweight champion. Khan knocked Gomez down twice in the fight, once in the opening round, and once in the fifth before the referee waved the fight off, giving Khan the victory via TKO. Still, Khan himself was hurt at various times during the fight, and was himself dropped in the second round. Despite Khan's eagerness at a world title shot, his promoter, Frank Warren, insisted that "He needs more schooling".

==== Khan vs. Prescott, Fagan ====
Following the Gomez fight, Jorge Rubio was installed as Khan's new trainer. In early August, the lightweight Breidis Prescott was put forward by Rubio as Khan's next opponent. Rubio had previously coached Richar Abril, who had recently lost a close decision to Prescott. Prescott had a prolific knock-out record of 17 KOs in 19 contests, yet Khan was a huge favourite.

The fight took place on 6 September 2008 at the Manchester Evening News Arena, it was Khan's Sky Box Office debut. In the first round, Prescott came out fast and landed good shots; a stiff jab jerked Khan's head back and foreshadowed what was to come. Prescott landed a left hook on Khan's temple, dizzying his senses. Instead of holding, Khan tried to fire back, but was hit to the head by a left hook, right hook combination that sent him crashing to the canvas. Although Khan managed to return to his feet, Prescott forced the stoppage with another left that put Khan down again. The bout was officially called off at 55 seconds.

Following the defeat, Rubio was sacked and was replaced by Freddie Roach. Khan began training with Roach at the Wild Card Gym in Los Angeles, training alongside stablemate Manny Pacquiao, the then WBC lightweight champion and pound-for-pound king. On 6 December 2008, Khan scored a comeback win against Oisin Fagan with a second-round stoppage; Khan won the vacant WBA International lightweight title. Khan knocked Fagan down twice in the first round and Fagan's corner threw in the towel after he was knocked down again in the second. Following the fight, it emerged that Fagan had suffered a fractured fibula during the first knockdown.

==== Khan vs. Barrera ====
In early 2009, it was announced that Khan would fight former seven-time and three-weight world champion Marco Antonio Barrera. Barrera was ranked No. 1 and Khan No. 5 in the WBO world lightweight rankings. Previous IBF, and WBO lightweight title holder Nate Campbell was stripped of the belts after moving up to the light-welterweight division and Khan's promoter Frank Warren and Barrera's promoter Don King lobbied the WBO to elevate the Khan-Barrera fight to a world lightweight title eliminator. However, the world-title status was instead given to the fight between Juan Manuel Márquez and Juan Diaz, ranked No. 2 and No. 3 respectively by the WBO.

On 14 March 2009, at the MEN Arena in Manchester, Khan defeated Barrera by technical decision (TD). The fight was stopped towards the end of the fifth round due to Barrera suffering a cut in the first round, which resulted from a clash of heads. With Barrera deemed in no position to fight on by the ringside doctor, the fight then went to the scorecards, on all three of which Khan was ahead (50–44, and 50–45 twice). With victory, Khan defended his WBA International lightweight title and also won the vacant WBO Inter-Continental lightweight title.

Frank Warren was sufficiently impressed with Khan's performance to vow to land a world title fight for him before the end of the year.

There was a lot on his shoulders, but I always felt he could rise to the big occasion. I'd like to see him get a belt round his waist by the end of this year.

Khan also commented on the fight, saying:

I felt so completely easy, catching him with jabs. I felt like I was on a better level than him. The jabbing and patience – I felt so strong. You could see the difference. I had to take some shots in that match. I made some mistakes in the past and I'm not going to make them again.

=== Light welterweight ===
==== Khan vs. Kotelnik ====
It was announced on 8 April 2009 that Khan would move up to the light-welterweight division to fight Andreas Kotelnik (31–2–1, 13 KOs) at the MEN Arena in Manchester for the WBA light-welterweight title on 18 July. Khan Said, "This is the best news that I could have received. To fight for the world title in only my 22nd fight and at the age of just 22 is fantastic. Frank has done a great job getting the world title fight for me in Britain and now I have to go out win it." This would be Kotelnik's fourth title defence. Khan won by unanimous decision (UD), 120–108, 118–111, 118–111, in front of 10,000, and became the third-youngest Brit to win a world title, at the age of 22. Khan used his hand speed and fitness to go well ahead on points in the first ten rounds. Kotelnik rallied in the closing rounds but could not land a decisive punch on Khan in spite of his best efforts. After the fight, Khan said, "It's the best feeling ever. I want to thank Freddie Roach and my team for making this happen. I'm a world champion and I'm going to enjoy it. I'm still young and I've got big things to come."

==== Khan vs. Salita ====
On 6 October 2009, Frank Warren confirmed that Khan would defend his WBA light-welterweight title against undefeated Dmitry Salita (30–0–1, 16 KOs), the mandatory challenger, on 5 December, at the Metro Radio Arena in Newcastle upon Tyne, England. Due to Khan being a practising Muslim and Salita being an Orthodox Jew, the fight was hyped as a religious clash by the media, referring to it as a "battle of faiths" or "holy war", though Khan and Salita both denied such claims. The fight only lasted 76 seconds, with Khan winning via first-round knockout, following three knockdowns. Khan started aggressively landing quick right hands within the first 10 seconds. These shots disorientated Salita. The first knockdown occurred following a clean combination, with that was just the third punch he landed. Khan continued with his fast combinations, which included corkscrew shots from above. He landed a left uppercut, again unsettling Salita, who was still struggling to find his balance. Salita was knocked down twice more before referee Luis Pabon ultimately stopped the fight, deeming Salita was no longer able to continue.

On 17 January 2010, Khan announced he had split with promoter Frank Warren and signed a deal with Oscar De La Hoya and Golden Boy Promotions, which resulted in Khan's fights moving back to ITV.

==== Khan vs. Malignaggi ====
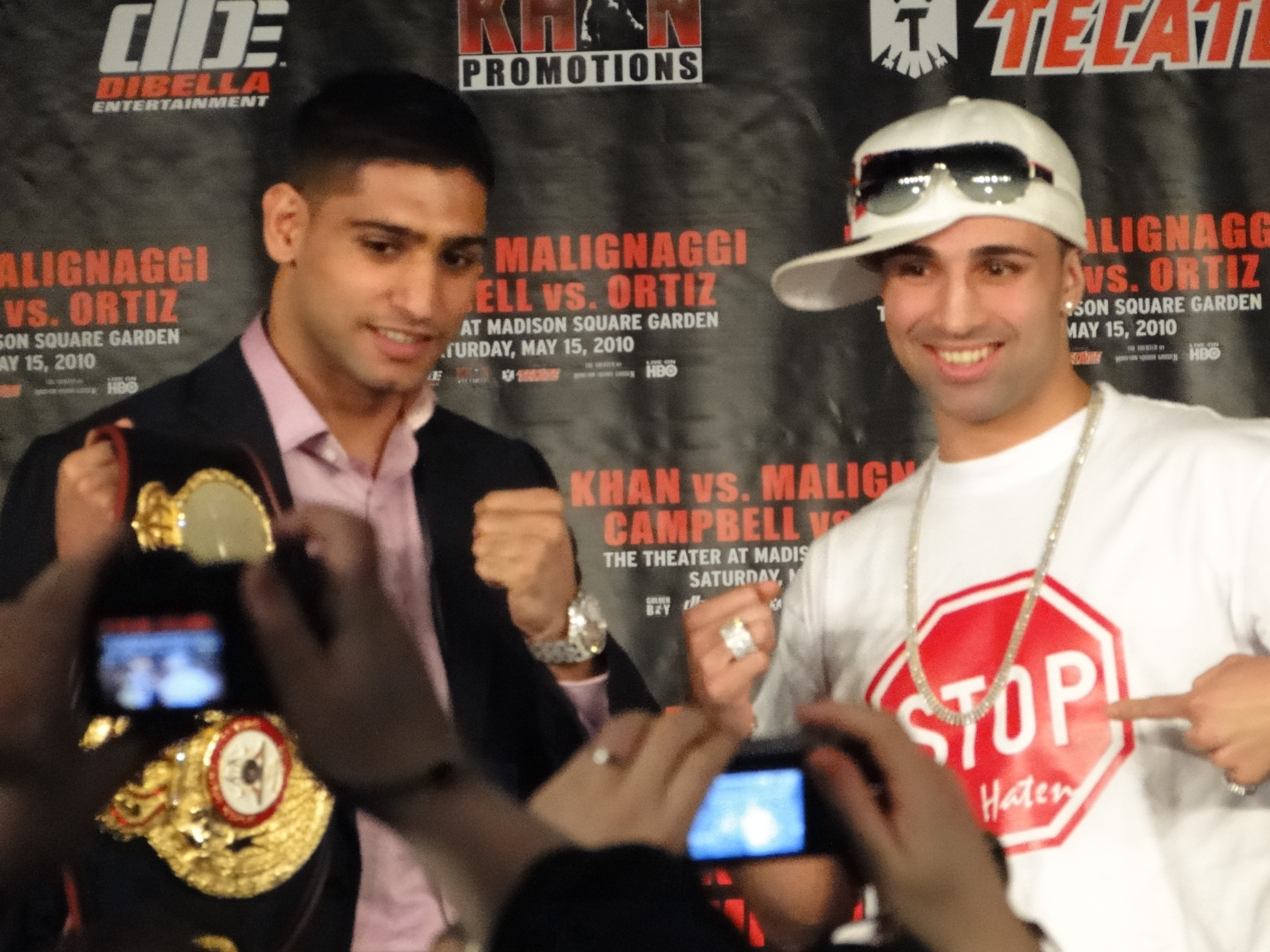
Khan (left) and Malignaggi at the press conference on 17 March 2010.

On 9 March 2010, Golden Boy Promotions confirmed that Khan and former light-welterweight world champion Paulie Malignaggi would hold a press conference in London to announce their world title bout set for 15 May at The Theater at Madison Square Garden in New York. This was Khan's first bout in the United States and the second defence of his WBA title.

It was a one-sided fight in front of 4,412 in attendance as Khan successfully retained his title after referee Steve Smoger stopped the fight at 1 minute 25 seconds of the eleventh round. The fight was filled with tension, which was fueled by heated exchanges before the event. This led to a few scuffles at the weigh-in. Khan showcased his hand speed and precise jab to dictate the pace from the beginning. Malignaggi found the tempo difficult to maintain. In the third round, Malignaggi landing counterpunches that caused Khan to miss on at time, however, Khan quickly restored control in the following rounds. He delivered combinations, notably a left hook and a right uppercut, which caused Malignaggi to wobble. Malignaggi fell to the canvas in the fifth round. This was ruled a slip, and he was able to continue. From the sixth round, Khan's jab and straight shots broke through Malignaggi's defense. Malignaggi's activity level diminished, and he struggled to counterattack effectively. Following the tenth round, the referee consulted with Malignaggi's corner regarding the possibility of allowing one final round if Malignaggi could alter the course of the fight. In the eleventh round, Khan launched an attack, landing a series of punches that prompted the referee to stop the fight just 85 seconds into the round, resulting in a TKO win for Khan. Malignaggi wanted to proceed, but it was clear the referee made the right. At the time of stoppage, the judges had Khan ahead on points, with scores of 100-90 across all three scorecards.

In the aftermath Malignaggi admitted he lost to the better man, saying, "I've fought two elite fighters, Miguel Cotto and Amir Khan. From here, I'm not sure where I go. I'll sit down with my team. I don't want to be a punching bag." Khan earned $1.1 million and Malignaggi received $500,000. Khan stated he wanted to fight Marcos Maidana next, and that he would not be leaving the light-welterweight division until he had unified the various belts, suggesting that the way to do this would be for him to fight Maidana, and then go on to face the winner of a Devon Alexander vs. Timothy Bradley match.

==== Khan vs. Maidana ====
Maidana (29–1, 27 KOs), after failing to challenge undefeated WBO light-welterweight champion Timothy Bradley, postponed the fight to 19 June due to a back injury. On 3 May, Maidana pulled out of the fight again, still citing his back as the problem. The fight had already been rescheduled from 19 June to 17 July, and Bradley went on to fight Luis Carlos Abregu on 17 July, instead of Maidana. After failing to secure the fight with Bradley, Maidana's camp announced that he would fight former WBO light-welterweight champion DeMarcus Corley, on 28 August 2010 at the Luna Park Stadium in Buenos Aires, Argentina. Maidana went on to win by UD. Khan continued to look for a suitable opponent to challenge next for his title. One of his possible opponents was lightweight champion Juan Manuel Marquez. Marquez decided not to move up in weight and stayed at lightweight. Maidana then stated his intention to fight Khan: "Stop looking for possible opponents for next Khan 11 December in England. Stop looking for lightweight boxers and face the real 140-pounders. I'll go to Khan's home soil to take the other portion of the WBA title that belongs to me." The fight was confirmed on 16 September to take place at the Mandalay Bay in Las Vegas on 11 December. Khan was reported to earn at least $1.5 million compared to Maidana who had a purse of $550,000.

Khan successfully defended his title for the third time against Maidana. Khan knocked Maidana down with a combination of two body shots in the first round. Maidana was saved by the bell but regained composure and continued to battle on. Khan dominated the scoring until tiring around round seven. Maidana rallied and midway through round ten stunned Khan with a heavy right hand. Maidana followed up with a series of uppercuts and right hands. Khan then rallied to win rounds eleven and twelve to solidify a UD win. The scores were 114–111 twice, and 113–112. Khan was open to a rematch. Khan landed 273 of 603 punches thrown (45%) and Maidana landed 156 of 767 thrown (20%). The fight was awarded Fight of the Year by the Boxing Writers Association of America.

==== Khan vs. McCloskey, Judah ====
On 4 February 2011, Khan announced a deal had been signed to defend his WBA title against European champion Paul McCloskey in his next fight, who was unbeaten in 22 fights and was ranked world number 10. The fight was scheduled to take place at the MEN Arena on 6 April. Khan won a sixth-round TD after McCloskey was cut by an accidental clash of heads and could not go on in the estimation of the ring doctor. The heads of Khan and McCloskey collided about two minutes into the sixth round, causing a bad cut on the inside of McCloskey's left eyebrow. Another tactical few rounds followed, with Khan the main aggressor. In the decisive sixth, a five-punch combination from Khan staggered McCloskey and moments later the pair went toe-to-toe before McCloskey reeled away and noticed blood coming from around his left eye. Khan had some trouble with the awkward and resilient southpaw, who was difficult to hit cleanly, but he was both too quick and too busy for McCloskey, winning all six rounds on all three cards. Frank Warren stated that the fight's Primetime pay-per-view sold four times as many buys as the network's previous record holder, Carl Froch vs. Mikkel Kessler, which sold 50,000 buys, thus the Khan–McCloskey fight sold about 200,000 buys. The fight was shown in the US on HBO where it averaged 1.2 million viewers.

On 31 May 2011, Khan agreed to fight 33-year-old two-weight champion Zab Judah (41–6, 28 KOs) in attempt to unify the WBA, and IBF light-welterweight titles in Las Vegas on 23 July. Judah had reclaimed the IBF title two months earlier against Kaizer Mabuza. Khan was unhappy that a fight with Bradley could not be made. He said, "Bradley was the guy I wanted to fight but he chickened out. I offered him 50% of UK revenue, which is unheard of, and 50% of all revenue in America, that's how much I wanted to fight him, but he didn't want it." The fight was broadcast on Primetime in UK and HBO in the US. Round one saw a busy Khan as he fought from the outside and kept Judah away with jabs and straights. All four rounds were taken by Khan. Ultimately in the fifth round Judah was taken down with a right uppercut to the body, in which at first commentators believed it was a low blow, since Judah was showing signs of agonising pain, but when it was seen from a different camera angle, it was right on the belt, leading to an 18th knockout (KO) for Khan in his career so far. Khan later rejected claims for the low blow saying, "He went down. It was above the belt. Zab's a great fighter. I respect him a lot. But it was nowhere near below [the belt]. It was a great shot." Over five rounds, Khan landed 61 of 284 total punches (21%) and Judah landed 20 of 115 (17%). For the fight, Khan earned $1,072,500 and Judah had a $500,000 purse. The fight averaged 1.4 million viewers on HBO, peaking at 1.417 million viewers.

==== Khan vs. Peterson ====
Following the Judah victory, Khan began chasing a big money fight with top pound for pound fighter Floyd Mayweather Jr. Mayweather seemed uninterested, and instead said that Khan should fight the Mayweather Promotions prospect Jessie Vargas, an option that Khan dismissed. In October 2011, it was announced that Khan would defend his WBA and IBF light-welterweight against mandatory challenger Lamont Peterson (29–1–1, 15 KOs). The fight would take place on 10 December in Peterson's home town of Washington, D.C. at the Walter E. Washington Convention Center.

In front of a near sell out crowd of 8,647, Peterson defeated Khan by split decision (SD) in controversial fashion. Khan was docked a point in rounds seven and twelve by referee Joe Cooper for pushing, although illegal pushing is not usually met with such harsh consequences. Peterson was dropped to the canvas twice, although the first time was counted as a slip instead of a legitimate knockdown. Both fighters boxed well and two judges scored it 113–112 to Peterson, with the other 115–110 to Khan.

ESPN's Dan Rafael scored the fight 114–111 in favour of Khan. HBO's unofficial scorer, Harold Lederman, scored it 113–112, also for Khan. Deadspin described it as a robbery. After the fight, Khan said, "It was like I was against two people, the referee and Lamont himself. I was the cleaner fighter; he was so wild. The referee wasn't giving me a chance. I heard the referee give me a warning [for pushing], but there was nothing I could do. He kept coming in with his head. There hasn't been [HBO] boxing in D.C. for the last [18] years because this is what happens." Khan earned a base purse of $1.1 million, while Peterson earned a career-high $650,000 purse.

Khan appealed the decision to the sanctioning bodies, citing the poor refereeing, and the presence of a "mystery man" at ringside who could have interfered with the scoring. As soon as the WBA agreed and ordered an immediate rematch, Khan withdrew his appeal with the IBF.

A rematch was due to take place in May, but in the run up to the fight, Peterson tested positive for synthetic testosterone. The Nevada Athletic Commission denied Peterson a licence to box, and the fight was cancelled. The WBA reinstated Khan as champion, the IBF did not.

==== Khan vs. García ====
On 17 May 2012, talks were ongoing for a potential title unification fight between Khan and WBC champion Danny García, with 7 July at the Honda Center in Anaheim, California, being considered as a possible date. Richard Schaefer was negotiating and working to finalize terms for both fighters. One of the main issues was from Khan’s status as the IBF and WBA champion after his controversial split-decision loss to Lamont Peterson. The planned rematch was scrapped when Peterson tested positive for synthetic testosterone, prompting Golden Boy Promotions’ legal team to explore options for overturning the result and reinstating Khan as champion. At the same time, García had to fulfil a mandatory defense against Ajose Olusegun. If Khan were to be reinstated as champion, the rules typically allowed for a unification fight to take priority over the mandatory defense. Olusegun publicly protested being overlooked, insisting he wouldn’t step aside and claiming his right to a title shot. García stated he would only fight Khan if the match was officially recognized as a unification bout. On 23 May, Khan announced he would fight García on 14 July at the Mandalay Bay in Las Vegas, with HBO set to broadcast the fight. By 11 July, Khan had been officially reinstated as WBA champion, and the bout was set to include the vacant Ring Magazine title. WBC President José Sulaimán clarified that the winner would need to vacate one of the world titles, citing the WBC’s policy against recognizing unified champions with other sanctioning bodies. Sulaimán was surprised at the involvement of the WBA title and reiterated the WBC’s exclusive recognition of its own championship.

Trainer Freddie Roach declared a $1,000 incentive for any sparring partner to try knocking down Khan during sparring sessions. Khan stated these sessions sometimes presented a greater challenge than his actual bout. Both Khan and Garcia participated in random drug testing, administered by the United States Anti-Doping Agency (USADA). This was prompted by Khan's planned rematch with Peterson being cancelled, during which the Voluntary Anti-Doping Association (VADA) served as the testing agency.

From when the fight was announced, García's father and trainer, Angel García, made critical comments about Khan's race and religion. He stated that Khan was overrated and predicted with that his son would retain his title. Khan disputed the claim, stating that a win over Garcia would counter the notion of him being overrated. Khan was not affected by the personal nature of the comments. He noted that the disrespect displayed by his father only served to further motivate him. Angel made antagonistic remarks regarding his experiences with Pakistani fighters, stating that he had never met one who he considered skilled. He clarified that the statement was based on personal observation rather than racial bias. Angel also questioned Roach's reputation, saying that the trainer's success was largely attributed to his association with already established champions instead of developing new talent. He further commented on Khan's past defeats, suggesting that Khan utilized religion to deflect responsibility for his losses. At the fight week press conference, Angel García once again captured the attention with his unusual behaviour and provocative remarks regarding Khan's Pakistani heritage. He displayed gestures and playful mock punches, whilst Khan was speaking. In response, Khan vowed to knockout García, as such a victory would silence his father's criticisms. Both weighed in at 139 pounds.

Khan entered the fight as heavy favourite and through the first two rounds and most of the third, he heavily outlanded García. The tide turned late in the third round as García was able to land a hard left hook counterpunch off a missed right. Khan hit the canvas and was clearly hurt, on unsteady legs, for the remaining seconds of the round. García kept pressing in round four, forcing Khan to take a second eight count after he touched the canvas with his glove. Khan regrouped and was temporarily able to go back at García, but with less than a minute left in the round Khan was dropped a third time. Referee Kenny Bayless stopped the fight despite Khan assuring him he could continue. After the fight, Khan said, "It wasn't my night. I was coming in with my hands down and Danny took advantage of that. He countered very well against me." Khan's trainer Roach credited his opposite number, Angel García, for successfully goading Khan into fighting a slugfest, leaving himself vulnerable.

According to CompuBox, Khan landed 92 of 206 punches thrown (45%), with 46 jabs and 46 power shots landed. García landed 65 of his 216 thrown (30%), 60 of which were power shots. Khan earned $950,000, while García had a $520,000 purse. Nevada State Athletic Commission announced the fight generated a total gate of $426,152 from 3,147 tickets sold. The fight averaged 1.3 million viewers on HBO World Championship Boxing.

==== Khan vs. Molina ====
Khan split with trainer Freddie Roach following the García defeat and started training under Virgil Hunter. It was hoped that the new coach could improve Khan's defensive skills. Khan's next fight was against undefeated lightweight prospect Carlos Molina (17–0–1, 7 KOs). Molina would be moving up in weight for his first twelve-round fight. The fight was aired on Showtime, on 15 December 2012, and took place in the LA Sports Arena in California. Khan defeated Molina by TKO in the tenth round and won the WBC Silver light-welterweight title. Khan pushed Molina onto the back foot and landed a sharp right hand that cut Molina over the left eye. Khan was stiffened by a right hook in the second before steadying the ship and resuming control of the contest. With Molina's cut deteriorating badly and taking plenty of punishment, referee Jack Reiss suggested his corner pull him out at the end of the ninth, however Molina was sent out for more, despite it being abundantly clear that he did not have the ability to do Khan much damage. Khan started to let his hands go more in round ten, after which his corner finally decided it had seen enough. Khan landed 312 of 679 punches thrown (46%), an equal amount of jabs and power shots were landed. Molina was less busy, landing 87 of 335 (26%). The fight averaged 616,000 viewers.

In January 2013, Richard Schaefer was engaged in efforts to arrange a rematch between Khan and Danny García, who was scheduled to defend his titles against Zab Judah on 9 February. Khan anticipated a ring return on 20 April, in the UK. Discussions were ongoing to finalize an opponent. Schaefer stated that he had communicated with Garcia's adviser, Al Haymon, who was also interested in the rematch. The plan was for Khan to fight in April, followed by a subsequent bout against Garcia in November or December 2013.

=== Welterweight ===
==== Khan vs. Diaz, Collazo ====
Following his victory over Molina, Khan returned to the UK for a fight against 33 year old Julio Díaz (40–7–1, 29 KOs) on 27 April 2013 in a 143 lbs catch-weight bout. The fight took place at the Motorpoint Arena in Sheffield. Khan was able to control some of the fight and managed to survive a fourth-round knockdown from Díaz. Khan managed to hold on throughout the fight to go onto win by UD. The scorecards read 115–113, 115–112, and 114–113. In the aftermath, Khan praised Díaz, "He caught me while I was off balance, and I couldn't get my stance back. I went down. I kept moving to recompose myself. That's what happens. There are little things to work on when we go back in the gym." Khan stated the fight could be his last in the UK.

Despite interest in a bout with Khan, Floyd Mayweather announced that he would fight Marcos Maidana (35–3, 31 KOs) on 3 May 2014. On 24 March, Khan decided to fight 32-year-old former champion Luis Collazo (35–5, 18 KOs) on the undercard at the MGM Grand Las Vegas. The fight was for the vacant WBA International welterweight title and WBA title eliminator, as well as the vacant WBC Silver title. Khan was too fast and too disciplined for Collazo, flooring him in the fourth round and twice in the tenth. The judges scored the fight 119–104, and 117–106 twice in Khan's favour. Khan and Collazo both incurred point deductions in round eight. Collazo hit Khan with a low blow while Khan was holding his head down. Collazo's failed approach resulted in a mismatch on the scorecards. Collazo fought with his hands down most of the night, unafraid of Khan, believing Khan had no power and he would eventually knock him out. In the post-fight interview in the ring, Khan credited his twelve months of boxing training with Virgil Hunter for his success. Khan's purse for the fight was $1.5m while Collazo earned $350,000.

==== Khan vs. Alexander ====
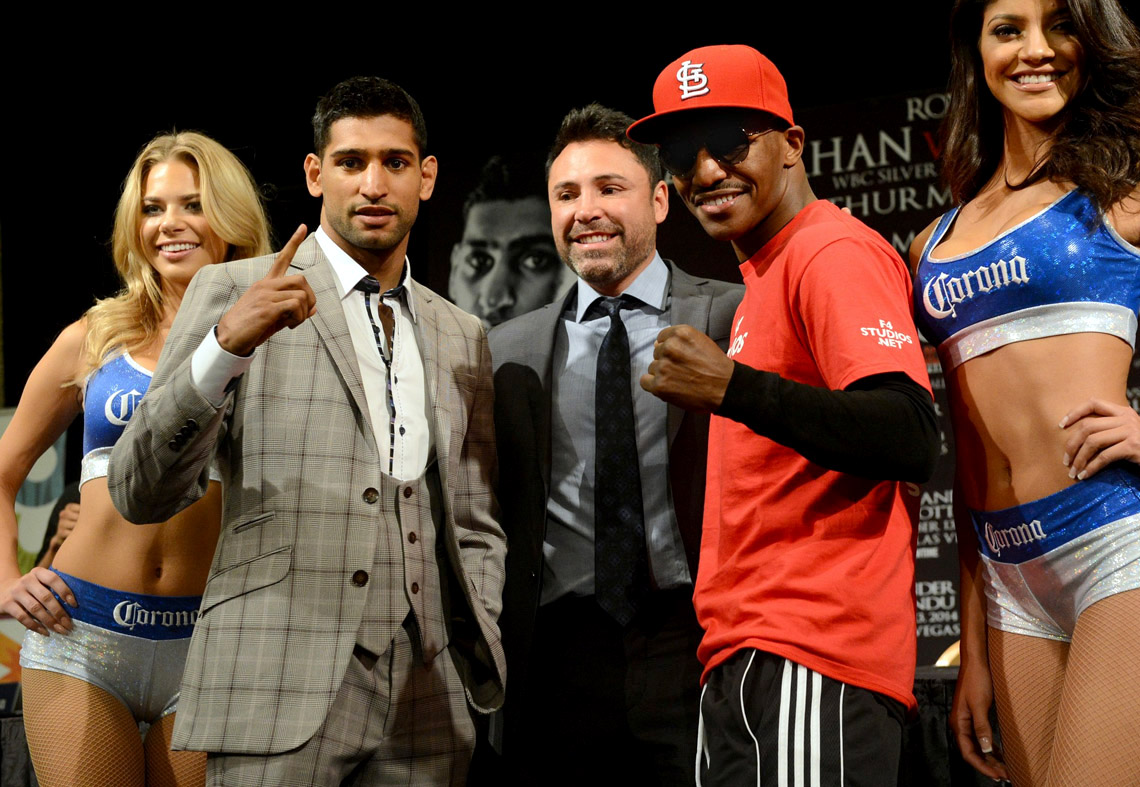
Khan vs Devon Alexander Press Conference

Khan looked to fight one more time in 2014, targeting Devon Alexander or Robert Guerrero. On 21 October, it was announced that Khan would fight former two-weight world champion Alexander (26–2, 14 KOs). The fight took place on 13 December at the MGM Grand in Las Vegas on Showtime in the US and Sky Sports in the UK.

In front of 7,768 in attendance, Khan produced a dominant performance to secure a unanimous points victory over Alexander. All three judges scored heavily in Khan's favour, 120–108, 119–109 and 118–110. ESPN's Dan Rafael scored it a 120–108 shutout for Khan. Alexander followed Khan around the ring throughout but was unable to land more than one punch at a time as Khan met him in his tracks with hard combinations. After his victory Khan reiterated his desire to fight Floyd Mayweather. Promoter Oscar De La Hoya said, "So now I know why Mayweather doesn't want to fight him. He was brilliant. I wouldn't have fought him. He is hitting his peak just now. He looked incredible." Khan outlanded Alexander 243 to 91, according to CompuBox, and connected on 43% of his shots, compared to just 20% for Alexander. Khan earned $950,000 and Alexander was paid $600,000 for the fight. The fight averaged 762,000 and peaked 887,000 viewers.

==== Khan vs. Algieri ====
After Khan himself initially announced the fight on his wife's YouTube channel on 3 April, a welterweight bout against former WBO light-welterweight champion Chris Algieri (20–1, 8 KOs) was later finalised to take to place on 29 May 2015, at the Barclays Center in Brooklyn, New York. Khan won the bout by UD, winning on all three judges scorecards (117–111 twice and 115–113). Khan counterpunched effectively from the outside after being surprised with Algieri's aggression. Algieri fought a far better fight than he did against Manny Pacquiao, throwing more punches and landing some power shots. Khan landed 218 of 609 punches thrown (36%), while Algieri landed on 199 of 703 (28%), most of which were in the opening six rounds. Following the victory, Khan was now 5–0 against New York opponents. He again called out Mayweather saying, "I think everybody knows Amir Khan wants to fight Floyd Mayweather. Mayweather is a champion, so let's make it happen." Khan made $1.5 million and Algieri earned a $500,000 purse. The fight, which took place on Spike, averaged 1 million viewers and peaked at 1.2 million.

In September 2015, Danny García began to express interest in a rematch with Khan. García was now competing in the welterweight division, the same as Khan and aiming for big fights. Since their fight, Khan had achieved a five-fight winning streak. García was confident regarding a potential rematch. He recognized Khan's abilities but maintained that he had also improved vastly through experience, since their first meeting. Khan was considering a possible showdown with Manny Pacquiao before a possible rematch with Garcia. According to Garcia, a rematch between them would be financially rewarding and appeal to a wider audience.

By January 2016, Garcia now stated he was no longer interested in a rematch with Khan, despite Khan being designated as the mandatory challenger for the WBC welterweight title. His father and trainer, Angel, wanted them to focus on new opportunities. Khan was also searching for an opponent and publicly denied claims made by Pacquiao’s team regarding a failed negotiation. Khan criticized Kell Brook for demanding a 50-50 split, implying that Brook should be more realistic on his financial terms. Hearn mentioned that negotiations were ongoing and responded to Khan's statements regarding the split. Hearn stated that Khan requested a £10m guarantee with PPV upside, while Brook was proposed to receive up to £2.5m. Hearn implied that they were prepared to offer a 60-40 split in favor of Khan.

=== Middleweight ===
==== Khan vs. Álvarez ====
In early 2016, it was announced that Khan is moving up two weight divisions to middleweight, to fight Canelo Álvarez (46–1–1, 32 KOs) WBC, The Ring, and lineal middleweight titles. A catchweight of 155 lb was in effect, at which Álvarez had fought for his previous four fights. The fight took place on 7 May 2016, at the new T-Mobile Arena in Las Vegas. The bout was on HBO PPV.

Khan lost to Álvarez by way of knockout in round six. Although many believe Khan was ahead on points including ESPN, two of the ringside judges had Álvarez ahead after five rounds (49–46 and 48–47), the third judge had Khan ahead (48–47). Khan began the fight strongly, using superior hand speed and footwork to outbox Álvarez in the early rounds. However, Álvarez gradually gained control by pressuring Khan and targeting the body. In the sixth round, Álvarez landed a decisive right hand to the chin, knocking Khan unconscious and prompting the referee to stop the fight at 2:37. With the scorecards heading towards a SD halfway through the fight, Khan admitted, "it may have been a blessing being knocked out in the sixth round, rather than an upset loss on the scorecards after twelve rounds. According to CompuBox, Álvarez landed 64 of 170 (38%) and Khan landed 48 of 166 punches (29%).

Alvarez' official purse for the bout was $3.5 million and Khan had a base purse of $2 million. With the event hitting at least 500,000 buys, Alvarez would see his earning reach up to $20 million and Khan's earnings around $13 million, plus his BoxNation TV deal.

The fight generated a live gate of $7,417,350, according to figures released by the Nevada State Athletic Commission. That total came from 13,072 tickets sold, far short of a sellout. The Álvarez-Khan gross placed it 34th-best in Nevada history. On PPV, the fight sold around 600,000 PPV buys and grossed more than $30 million. This made it one of the biggest recent PPV fights, behind Miguel Cotto vs. Canelo Álvarez, and surpassing Manny Pacquiao vs. Timothy Bradley III and Floyd Mayweather Jr. vs. Andre Berto.

=== Return to welterweight ===
In October 2016, Khan announced that he was unlikely to return to the ring until Summer 2017. He hoped to fight in Britain against either Danny Garcia or Kell Brook. Following surgery on his right hand, he anticipated being sidelined for a year. He stated that the injury had affected his punching ability throughout his career. Khan planned to return to the welterweight division.

On 26 February 2017, Khan and reigning WBO welterweight champion Manny Pacquiao both tweeted a deal had been reached between them for a 'super fight' worth potentially £30 million to take place on 23 April in the United Arab Emirates. Pacquiao was initially in negotiations to fight Jeff Horn in Australia, but held a poll asking the fans who he should fight next. Khan won the poll, thus setting up the fight. The Sevens Stadium in Dubai, Zayed Sports City Stadium and Mohammed Bin Zayed Stadium in Abu Dhabi were being considered as venues. Speaking to Bob Arum on 1 March, Pacquiao's adviser Michael Koncz confirmed the fight would place on 20 May in the United Arab Emirates. A week later, Bob Arum told ESPN, "It's kaddish for the UAE deal. It's dead." Arum also said that Khan would not be Pacquiao's next opponent.

==== Khan vs. Lo Greco ====
On 10 January 2018, during a live press conference in London, Khan signed a three-fight deal with Eddie Hearn at Matchroom Sport. The deal meant Khan would fight exclusively on Sky Sports, with his return bout in the UK taking place on 21 April at the Echo Arena in Liverpool. on 29 January, Phil Lo Greco (28–3, 17 KOs) was announced as his opponent. At the official press conference, a brawl broke out after Lo Greco made comments about Khan's personal life, "After the Canelo loss you went on a losing streak – family, wife and then you go out and tweet to the heavyweight champion of the world. What is wrong with you, mate?" Khan responded by throwing his glass full of water towards Lo Greco. The bout was fought at a catchweight of 150 pounds, as requested by Lo Greco's team. Khan trained with Joe Goosen for the fight, with Virgil Hunter unavailable due to ill health. The fight would be the first boxing main event to stream on ESPN's new streaming service ESPN+.

Khan knocked Lo Greco out in 39 seconds of round one, setting a new record for himself. The first knockdown occurred after just 15 seconds when Khan landed a right hand to the head. Lo Greco appeared hurt, but managed to beat the 10 count. When the action resumed, Khan quickly moved on Lo Greco, putting him against the ropes with a flurry of punches until he dropped once more. Referee Victor Loughlin called a halt to the fight immediately. After the fight, rival Kell Brook, who was on pundit duty, entered the ring and the two boxers traded words. Khan said, "The weight is an issue with Kell, I'm a 147 lbs fighter. I will fight and beat Kell Brook and the world knows it." During the post-fight press conference, Khan named a number of top welterweights including Keith Thurman and Errol Spence, but stated he would like to bring Adrien Broner over to the UK for a big fight.

==== Khan vs. Vargas ====
At an official press conference on 28 June, it was announced that Khan would return to Arena Birmingham for the first time since 2008, against Colombian Samuel Vargas (29–3–2, 14 KOs), who has been a five-fight unbeaten run since November 2016. Speaking of the fight, Khan said, "One of my aims this year was to be as active as possible, so I'm very happy to get back in the ring again so soon against Samuel Vargas. Vargas is a tough and well-schooled fighter, who has shared the ring with some top welterweights including Danny Garcia and Errol Spence Jr." Vargas weighed 146 lbs. At first attempt Khan weighed 147.2 lbs. He then took off his socks and weighed 147.1 lbs. Khan then took off his shorts, stripping completely naked and made the 147 lbs limit.

The fight took place on 8 September 2018, Khan won the fight by UD, with scores of 119–108, 119–109 and 118–110. Khan knocked Vargas twice in the fight in dropping him in round two and three. Vargas dropped Khan once in round three. Khan fought well in round five in landing a lot of fast combinations to the head of Vargas, who suffered a nose injury. Vargas took the punishment and showed a lot of heart as he kept coming forward. Midway through the fight, Khan began to slow down and showed fatigue. He began to pick his combinations rather than just throw a flurry. Vargas focused mostly on the body attack for the fight. He managed to have Khan in trouble as he pinned him against the ropes, most notably in rounds six and ten. After the fight, Khan said, "I really wanted to go the distance. It's been three years since I went twelve rounds. There were a couple of times when I could have stopped him and I kind of stepped off him." Khan called for a fight against former sparring partner Manny Pacquiao and Eddie Hearn said it was 'now or never' for a Kell Brook fight. According to CompuBox stats, Khan landed 199 punches of 581 thrown (35%) and Vargas was credited with landing 142 of his 535 thrown (27%). Vargas landed 100 shots to Khan's body, 91 being power punches. Hearn announced that the fight set a viewership record, for the biggest live audience on UK subscription television in boxing history.

==== Khan vs. Crawford ====
On 9 December 2018, it was reported that Top Rank had offered Khan a guaranteed $5 million purse, plus a percentage of PPV revenue, to fight Terence Crawford on 23 March 2019 at Madison Square Garden in New York. The fight was made official in January 2019, and it was set to take place at Madison Square Garden on 20 April. The fight would be broadcast live on ESPN PPV; UK broadcasting rights were later acquired by BT Sport Box Office. Khan, commenting on facing Crawford rather than long-time domestic rival Brook, believed winning a world title against a consensus pound-for-pound boxer would be a bigger achievement than defeating Brook. He also believed that win or lose against Crawford, the Brook opportunity would still be available. Khan returned to veteran trainer Virgil Hunter for the Crawford bout. Hunter was unable to train Khan for his previous two bouts due to ill health.

The fight, taking place in front of over 14,000 in attendance, ended in controversial circumstances when Crawford won by technical knockout in the sixth round due to an accidental low blow. Crawford knocked Khan down in the first round with a powerful overhand right towards the end of the round. Crawford continued to control the bout, utilizing his skills, speed, and power. He landed significant punches while Khan struggled to keep pace. The fight took a controversial turn in the sixth round, when Crawford landed an accidental low blow. Khan was given time to recover but notably chose not to continue, leading to the referee stopping the fight and awarding Crawford a TKO victory. The incident prompted debate regarding whether Khan was truly unable to continue or if he took the opportunity to exit a losing fight. At the time of the stoppage, Crawford lead on all three scorecards, 50–44, and 49–45 twice. According to CompuBox, Crawford landed 88 of 211 punches thrown (41.7%) and Khan landed 44 of 182 thrown (24.2%). Khan was guaranteed a base purse of $5 million (£3.85m) with Crawford set to take home a minimum of $5.5m (£4.23m).

After the fight, Khan said he wanted to continue but stated that he could not recover from the pain caused by the low blow. He rejected claims that he had quit. He explained that he was unable to continue due to the pain from the accidental low blow and felt incapacitated. He said the referee stopped the fight for his safety, despite believing the fight was going well. According to Khan, the pain travelled to his stomach and his left and he could not move. Khan apologised to fans, on the anticlimactic way the fight ended. His trainer, Virgil Hunter, supported Khan’s decision, insisting that Khan was indeed incapacitated and prioritized his safety over continuing. Crawford was disappointed with the fight ending but remained firm about his position as the champion. He called out other fighters, expressing an interest in unification bouts.

Khan was optimistic about his future. He indicated that opportunities to compete for titles would continue to present themselves and voiced particular interest in a potential matchup with his domestic rival, Kell Brook, despite Brook's opinion that the fight was no longer feasible. Khan maintained hope that the bout would ultimately take place.

==== Cancelled Neeraj Goyat fight ====
On 31 May 2019, Khan announced his next fight against 27 year old Indian boxer Neeraj Goyat (11-3-2, 2 KOs), scheduled for 12 July at King Abdullah Sports City in Jeddah, Saudi Arabia. The fight was to air for free on Channel 5. The fight was to hold significance as it represented the first time of a British Pakistani boxer facing an Indian opponent, which Khan viewed as an opportunity to promote unity between the two nations. Khan extended his appreciation to the Saudi government for the opportunity. To promote the fight, Khan and Goyat were scheduled to participate in a four-city media tour, beginning in Delhi and proceeding through Karachi, London, and Jeddah. The WBC created a special Pearl title for winner. Khan showed gratitude to WBC President Mauricio Sulaimán for acknowledging the importance of this historic match and for commissioning the special Pearl Championship belt.

Virgil Hunter raised concerns about Khan's training habits during periods between fights, indicating that inconsistent practice might be affecting his skill level. Hunter spoke about engaging in training camps beyond the standard ten-week preparation for fights. He noted that without continuous training to address areas of weakness, it would become challenging to ascertain whether Khan's skills had truly diminished or if they were merely not being effectively employed. Khan was training in Bolton with Clarence ‘Bones’ Adams and coach Alex Ariza. Khan said that America would remain his long-term training base, as he found it beneficial to train outside of his comfort zone. He believed that being in an unfamiliar environment helped him focus and train harder. According to Khan, this was a temporary break from Hunter.

Amnesty International criticized Saudi Arabia's human rights situation, urging Khan to be aware of the country's political climate. Khan defended his decision to fight in Saudi Arabia, citing the country's ongoing transformation despite concerns over its human rights record. Khan was scheduled to receive a £7 million purse, an increase of £3 million from his previous fight. As a Muslim who visited Saudi Arabia on several occasions, Khan noted the societal changes he observed, including women's participation in driving and public events. He conveyed a sense of optimism regarding the country's evolving landscape.

Khan stated that he would consider retirement if he did not perform well or felt dissatisfied during the fight. He preferred to make the decision regarding his retirement independently, rather than being compelled to do so. On 26 June, it was reported that Goyat was hospitalized due to serious injuries sustained in a car accident, which precluded his participation in the upcoming fight. The incident took place while Goyat was returning home after a training session. Super Boxing League promoter, Bill Dosanjh, was unhappy about the situation. The organizers were seeking a replacement for Goyat to ensure that the event could proceed as scheduled.

==== Khan vs. Dib ====
On 26 June 2019, former IBF featherweight champion Billy Dib (45-5, 26 KOs) stepped in to replace Goyat, agreeing to move up in weight and fight Khan on 12 July 2019. A day later, the WBC announced that the newly created 'pearl' title would not be conferred upon the winner of the bout. Instead, the WBC designated the fight for their vacant 'international' title. Additionally, they stated that the winner would be ranked within the top 5 of the welterweight division. Dib assessed Khan as a fighter who had declined from his previous elite status, stating that Khan was no longer the same competitor who once triumphed over top fighters. He pointed out that Khan appeared to be competing primarily for financial motivations. Dib was confident in his own strength and speed, mentioning that he did not have to be concerned about weight management for the fight. At the final press conference, Khan spoke about his goal of positioning Saudi Arabia as a significant center for boxing, with the backing of the Saudi General Sports Authority. He stated that the event marked the initial step in his endeavours to introduce prominent boxing to the region, aligning with Saudi Season, which seeks to boost the country's attractiveness as a tourist destination.

Khan won the WBC international title with a fourth-round stoppage of Dib. He showed his strength by knocking Dib down in the second round with a left hook. Although Dib described the fight as a "real-life Rocky moment," he could not endure Khan's relentless attack, which included a second knockdown in the fourth round. This led to the conclusion of the bout, as Dib's corner threw in the towel, officially stopping the fight at approximately 1:06 of the round. The decision followed a series of powerful punches from Khan, ending with a left hook that resulted in the stoppage. Khan said he wanted to fight Manny Pacquiao next, aiming to bring the fight to Saudi Arabia later in the year.

A week following the fight with Dib, Manny Pacquiao's team has denied Khan's statement that a fight agreement had been finalized for their matchup in Saudi Arabia on 8 November 2019. Khan said during a press conference that both boxers had signed contracts for the event. However, Sean Gibbons, president of MP Promotions, stated that Pacquiao had a planned fight against Keith Thurman on 20 July and had not signed any agreements for future bouts.

=== Catchweight ===
==== Khan vs. Brook ====
In August 2021, promoter Eddie Hearn of Matchroom was pursuing a potential boxing match between Khan and his British rival, Kell Brook, with the aim of finalizing the bout for December 2021 in Saudi Arabia. Previous attempts to arrange the fight had been unsuccessful over the past seven years; however, both fighters were now motivated to make it a reality, considering it could be their final bout. Brook said in an interview, “Aside from AJ vs. Tyson Fury, it is still the biggest fight in British boxing. And I still think everyone will get very excited about this fight." Matchroom had a TV deal with DAZN, which meant the fight would end up on the streaming platform. Hearn himself tried to make the fight in 2017, after Brook's stock increased following his stoppage loss to Gennadiy Golovkin. In 2018, Khan entered into a promotional agreement with Matchroom Boxing, resulting in both him and Brook being part of the same team. This development presented a favourable opportunity for the fight to take place, but an agreement was never reached. In October 2021, Khan accused Brook of changing the terms of their potential match. Khan used social media to state that Brook was no longer able to make the weight of 147 pounds. He detailed the situation by saying, “Kell said he would fight at 147. I agreed. Now Kell wants 149. Then he wants 149.5. Is he even serious about wanting the fight?” For the fight, Khan was trained by Brian ‘Bomac’ McIntyre, well known trainer of Terence Crawford. They began training together in August 2021. Khan felt the collaboration reinvigorated his fighting spirit, prompting him to expect an impressive performance in the fight. He compared his current condition to that of his prime years and stated that he believed he had superior skills compared to Brook.

On 26 November, Ben Shalom, of Boxxer, announced a deal was close to being finalized for the fight to take place in early 2022. On 29 November, it was officially announced that the fight would take place on 19 February 2022 at the AO Arena in Manchester, with live coverage provided by Sky Sports Box Office in the UK. In the United States, the card broadcast live on streaming platform ESPN+. During the presale, tickets were sold out in four minutes. Boxxer indicated that tickets for the match sold out in an impressive ten minutes, making it one of the fastest-selling events in the history of British boxing. Ben Shalom was astonished at the overwhelming demand, noting that the arena had not experienced such interest in years. Amid competing offers, Khan chose to broadcast the fight on Sky Sports instead of accepting a more lucrative deal from Matchroom for DAZN. Khan cited viewership as a priority, believing Sky Sports would draw a larger audience thanks to its longstanding presence in British boxing. Khan was confident in Sky's ability to promote the event successfully. While he recognized Hearn's expertise in promotion, he felt that DAZN, as a newer streaming service, would not offer the same degree of marketing support as Sky. A rematch clause was also inserted into the contract.

Brook showed his enthusiasm regarding the long-awaited fight, which came to fruition after 17 years of discussions, and mentioned the extensive effort required during the negotiations. He viewed the fight as a crucial event for both and their supporters, identifying it as a pivotal opportunity for Khan, who could no longer evade the encounter. Khan, in contrast, maintained that he never avoided Brook and mentioned his accomplishments in boxing. He recognized previous uncertainties about Brook's preparedness for the bout but stated that his attention was now fully directed toward the upcoming fight. For years, Brook maintained that Khan evaded a potential fight between them. In response during the lead-up to the event, Khan contested this claim, stating that he actively sought to make the fight a reality. He disclosed that his team directly reached out to Brook's management to explore the possibility of the match.

In January 2022, Khan showed concerns regarding the agreed weight limit of 149 pounds. Despite these concerns, he was determined to proceed with the fight. Khan indicated that Brook insisted on the 149-pound limit, which he accepted to ensure the fight took place. He criticized Brook's prior statements about being willing to fight at any weight, suggesting a discrepancy between Brook's words and actions. Khan stated he conceded to several of Brook's demands to prevent any responsibility for a potential cancellation of the fight, saying that his decision was made with his fans in mind. He acknowledged that while 149 pounds does not correspond to an official weight class, he was prepared to accept the terms to enable the bout. Khan instituted a weight penalty for Brook, mandating that he meet a contracted weight limit of 149 pounds, two pounds above the welterweight limit. Brook would incur a financial penalty of £100,000 for each pound he exceeded this limit. Khan stated that permitting Brook the additional weight was a tactical choice, as it imposed financial pressure on Brook to adhere to the limit. Shalom indicated that the financial penalty also applied to Khan. Khan also voiced his concerns regarding the lack of drug testing prior to the fight. He emphasized the importance of fair competition and enlisted sports lawyer Geoff Cunningham to facilitate the drug testing process. Khan pointed out an unusual delay in the testing, noting that organizations such as VADA or USADA typically carry out tests without significant delay. Despite being in training for four weeks, Khan was yet to undergo any testing, which he found concerning.

The final press conference featured numerous intense exchanges between Khan and Brook, alongside their respective trainers, McIntyre and Ingle. Khan said Brook was a "fanboy" and claimed he was "obsessed" with his career. The tension intensified as the trainers engaged in verbal sparring, particularly concerning the past performances and preparedness of their fighters for the fight. Both boxers acknowledged the significance of the fight, with Brook reflecting on their shared history and the mutual disrespect that has contributed to their longstanding rivalry. Khan weighed in at 147 pounds, comfortably under the catchweight limit set for the fight and Brook weighed 148 pounds.

Brook faced an unusual circumstance, as he was mandated to change his gloves upon entering the ring due to a disagreement regarding the agreed-upon brand. He reported being informed that his purse would be withheld unless he complied with the change, which he eventually did under pressure. In front of a sold out arena, Brook secured a victory over Khan via a sixth-round TKO, demonstrating dominance throughout the fight with a series of powerful punches and consistent pressure from the outset. Khan initially attempted to capitalize on his speed and quick combinations, landing an early left hook. However, Brook quickly established his presence with significant shots, including a straight right that notably unsettled Khan towards the end of the round. During the second round, Brook maintained his commanding position, using patience and timing to deliver solid right hands while effectively countering Khan’s offensive bursts. Khan began to establish a rhythm in the third round, connecting with several clean jabs. Nevertheless, Brook’s right hand continued to pose a challenge for Khan, and his aggressive approach resulted in noticeable swelling near Khan's left eye. Brook's persistent power punches began to wear down Khan as the fight progressed. In the fifth round, although Khan showed resilience and sought to remain mobile, Brook delivered multiple heavy combinations, visibly affecting Khan’s performance. The fight concluded in the sixth round when Brook launched an early flurry, landing several powerful shots with Khan positioned against the ropes. Referee Victor Loughlin intervened to stop the contest, ensuring Khan would not endure any further punishment. The time of stoppage was 51 seconds into the round. According to CompuBox, Khan landed 34 of 151 punches thrown (22.5%) and Brook landed 79 of 224 (35.3%). Brook landed 64 power punches with an impressive 42% connect rate. In contrast, Khan managed to land only 19 power punches.

During post-fight. both boxers showed respect in the ring and during the post-fight press conference, officially ending their bitter rivalry. Khan hinted at possible retirement following the defeat, citing waning enthusiasm for the sport. Brook, on the other hand, celebrated his victory, cementing his status as the "King of the North” and contemplated future fights against prominent British contenders. Khan reportedly earned £5 million for the bout, with Brook took home £3 million, with both receiving a share of the pay-per-view revenue, which sold over 500k buys.

Ben Shalom stated that Khan had three weeks to decide on activating the rematch clause, although he was sceptic about the rematch being in Khan's best interest due to the one-sided nature of their previous fight. Shalom noted that there were signs from Khan's camp suggesting he may not have approached the fight with the necessary seriousness, mentioning possible jet lag from his training camp in the United States. Brook was excited about continuing his boxing career and garnered interest from several fighters but was unable to finalize any plans until Khan reached a decision about the rematch. The prevailing opinion indicated that an immediate rematch was not justified given the one-sided outcome of their initial fight. Shalom recommended that Khan should initially engage in a preparatory match against a less challenging opponent to showcase his readiness and redefine his legacy prior to seeking another encounter with Brook.

=== Retirement ===
On 13 May 2022, Khan announced his retirement from boxing after 17 years as a professional. He is remembered for his legacy as a former unified light-welterweight world champion and an Olympic silver medallist. In a statement, he said:

"It's time to hang up my gloves. I feel blessed to have had such an amazing career that has spanned over 27 years. I want to say a heartfelt thanks to the incredible teams I have worked with and to my family, friends and fans for the love and support they have shown me."

Khan ended his professional career with a record of 34 wins and six losses, dating back to his debut in 2005. He sat down with Sky Sports, to discuss his career and stated that he had been contemplating retirement, before his last fight. This was driven on by family members who encouraged him after reaching his goals in boxing. He noted that his children wanted him to be more present at home, which also influenced his decision. He reflected on the physical toll that boxing took on him throughout the years and needed to prioritize his health and family life. Khan was thankful to be able to retire in good health and knowing what he achieved. He attributed a lot of his personal development and stability to boxing.

=== Doping violation ===
On 4 April 2023, Khan was handed a two-year backdated ban following a positive test for ostarine. The ruling was formally confirmed in February 2023 and applied to the period from April 2022 to April 2024. Following the fight against Kell Brook, Khan underwent an in-competition doping test conducted by UK Anti-Doping, which detected ostarine in his urine sample. UKAD informed Khan of the Adverse Analytical Finding (AAF) for ostarine on 6 April 2022 and issued a provisional suspension, thereby initiating the backdated ban period. UKAD stressed the principle of "strict liability," stating that athletes bear responsibility for any substances found in their bodies and stated the necessity of upholding clean sport practices. Khan persistently refuted allegations of intentional doping, proposing that the substance may have been ingested inadvertently, such as via a handshake. UKAD, however, dismissed this explanation as the source of the substance but acknowledged that the detected dosage was insufficient to enhance performance. On 20 July 2022, UKAD formally charged Khan with two Anti-Doping Rule Violations: the presence and use of a prohibited substance. Khan accepted these charges while maintaining that his ingestion of the substance was unintentional. An independent tribunal, the National Anti-Doping Panel (NADP), convened on 24 January 2023 to hear Khan's case. On 21 February, the tribunal issued a written decision affirming both violations. However, it concluded that Khan's conduct was neither deliberate nor reckless, leading to a two-year ban instead of the standard four-year penalty for strict liability violations.

== Trainers ==
- Oliver Harrison (July 2005 – April 2008)
- Jorge Rubio (July 2008 – September 2008)
- Freddie Roach (October 2008 – September 2012)
- Virgil Hunter (September 2012 – March 2018)
- Joe Goosen (March 2018 – January 2019)
- Virgil Hunter (January 2019 – April 2019)
- Clarence ‘Bones’ Adams (May 2019 – July 2019)
- Brian 'BoMac' McIntyre (August 2021 – February 2022)

== Promoter and sponsor ==
=== Khan Promotions ===
Amir Khan is a promoter, the CEO of his own boxing promotion company, Khan Promotions. In March 2021 Khan officially announced his first-ever signing, Tal Singh and is now managing the former England amateur champion, who he is hoping to guide towards a historic world title triumph. Khan relaunched AK Promotions in 2025, partnering with Legacy Promotions and DAZN, with the first event taking place in Accra, Ghana on 13 June 2025. Khan promoted his second boxing event in Nigeria in October 2025, featuring a main event between cruiserweights Brandon Glanton and Rocky Fielding, who was later replaced by Marcus Browne, in Lagos. Khan was excited about bringing world-class boxing to Nigeria, stating the event aimed to inspire a new generation and highlight the talent of Nigerian boxers alongside international competitors. His next event was promoted in association with Frank Warren's Queensberry Promotions on 21 December 2025 in Accra. This event included mainstream boxers Lawrence Okolie and Tony Yoka. AK Promotions returned to Lagos on 1 May 2026, this time, alongside Dr Ezekiel Adamu.

=== Amir Khan Academy ===
Khan announced that he was building a boxing academy called the Amir Khan Academy to produce Pakistani boxing champions. Based in Islamabad, the Amir Khan Academy is planning to train Pakistani amateur boxers competing at the 2018 Asian Games in Indonesia.

=== Super Fight League ===
In 2016, Khan was named co-owner of India's Super Fight League (SFL). He announced that he, along with Super Fight League, would introduce India's first team-based MMA league, with events expected to be held in India, the United States, Canada, and Dubai. SFL has had several Bollywood stars, including Sanjay Dutt, Ajay Devgn, Tiger Shroff, and Jacqueline Fernandez, as promoters and team ambassadors. SFL is the world's third largest MMA brand. It has had 67 live televised events, with over 100 million views.

=== Super Boxing League ===
In 2017, Khan and Bill Dosanjh founded Super Boxing League (SBL) after Super Fight League first season. The league is organised with the support of WBC and Professional Boxing Organisation India. The first season had 8 teams comprising both men and women pugilist. Both British Asian, Khan and Dosanjh have founded SBL to popularise professional boxing in India. SBL has had several Bollywood stars joining as team ambassadors, including Suniel Shetty, Rana Daggubati, Sushant Singh Rajput, Randeep Hooda, and Sohail Khan.

== Outside boxing ==
=== Personal life ===
In addition to boxing, Khan enjoys cricket, basketball, and football. He supports his local football club, Bolton Wanderers and has previously used the club's training facilities.

On 31 May 2013, Khan married Faryal Makhdoom at the Waldorf Astoria in New York City. The couple then flew back to Khan's hometown of Bolton where a second celebration, a traditional Walima, took place in Manchester, which included 4,000 guests. They have two daughters, Lamaisah, born in 2014, and Alayna, born in 2018, and a son, Zaviyar, born in 2020. On 4 August 2017, Amir announced that he and Faryal had agreed to split. In November 2017, photos emerged of Khan and his wife together. Khan later stated that he and his wife had reconciled.

In September 2013, Khan stated his plans to 'make Bolton better', by investing £5 million into a wedding and banqueting hall in Washington Street, Deane. Original plans were to be ready within 18 months, with an all glass front. On 23 November 2016, Khan made an announcement of the other businesses that would open alongside the banqueting hall; this included FMK make-up shop run by his wife Faryal, Argeela Lounge shisha bar and restaurant, British-Asian curry firm My Lahore, another buffet restaurant and coffee shop.

In 2014, he earned $15 million, making him the sixth highest-earning boxer that year. In 2016, his earnings from the Canelo fight was an estimated £9 million ($13.1 million), the highest for a British boxer since Wladimir Klitschko vs. David Haye in 2011.

In 2017, a private video was leaked online reportedly showing Khan performing a sex act. About the release of the tape, Khan said it was recorded "well before" he wed his wife Faryal Makhdoom in 2013.

In November 2019, Khan endorsed the Conservative candidate Gurjit Kaur Bains in Walsall South.

In April 2022, Khan and his wife were the victims of an armed robbery in East London. The robbers reportedly took Khan's watch, which was valued at £72,000. Dante Campbell and Ahmed Bana, the two individuals found guilty of the armed robbery, were sentenced in January 2025. Bana was given a prison term of nine years and eight months, whereas Campbell received a sentence of seven years and nine months. Khan and his family permanently moved to Dubai following the robbery in London, citing safety concerns as the primary reason for the relocation.

=== Charitable and community work ===
Khan has past and present involvements in supporting charitable and community causes. After the 2004 Indian Ocean tsunami, he was among those who raised money for its victims, and in the following year he visited Pakistan to dispense food in a camp set up after the Kashmir earthquake. He has also been involved with a campaign that promotes child safety around British railways, one that seeks improvements to the criminal justice system, and another that encourages men to play a role in ending violence against women.

Khan is an ambassador for the National Society for the Prevention of Cruelty to Children (NSPCC).

In December 2013, Khan hosted a fundraising dinner to support Islamic Relief's Philippines Appeal in the wake of Typhoon Haiyan, raising £83,400.

In 2015, he received an honorary degree from the University of Bolton for his contributions to sport and charity.

==== Amir Khan Foundation ====
Khan founded his own charity organisation, Amir Khan Foundation, with which he is involved in a number of charitable projects. The Water Wells project provides water wells in drought-stricken regions across Asia and Africa. Other projects include an orphanage in The Gambia, the #OrphanAID project in partnership with the Shilpa Shetty Foundation, providing aid in Syria in partnership with Islamic Relief, providing aid for Syrian refugees in Greece, and work with Barnardo's children's charity in Britain.

=== Media ===
Khan was involved in a TV programme for Channel 4, Amir Khan's Angry Young Men, which consisted of three 50-minute episodes. The programme centred around troubled angry men and aimed to use the disciplines of boxing, coupled with faith and family values, to help re-focus their lives and steer them away from trouble in the future. It was screened in August/September 2007.

On 29 March 2021, Khan appeared in an eight-part reality show on BBC Three called Meet the Khans: Big in Bolton, alongside his wife Faryal.

Khan has his own brand of soft drinks in Pakistan.

=== Game shows ===
As a celebrity, he has participated in several game shows. These include Countdown, Beat the Star, Who Wants to Be a Millionaire?, Celebrity Juice, and I'm a Celebrity...Get Me Out of Here!

==== I'm a Celebrity...Get Me Out of Here! ====
On 12 November 2017, Khan arrived in Brisbane, Australia to appear as a contestant on the seventeenth series of I'm a Celebrity...Get Me Out of Here!. Khan was the highest-paid contestant in the history of the show, beating the previous record held by Katie Price. On 8 December 2017, Khan was the seventh person to be eliminated from the show, coming in 5th place overall. The episode which featured Khan's elimination aired in the UK on his 31st birthday. Khan donated part of his earnings to Barnado's, for whom he is an ambassador.

The show's ratings averaged between 8 million and 10 million viewers every day for two weeks in the United Kingdom. The show peaked at 12.69 million viewers for the first episode, while the final episode drew 10.68 million viewers.

In 2023, he appeared in a spin-off I'm a Celebrity... South Africa.

=== Motoring offences and incidents ===
On 23 October 2007, Khan was convicted of careless driving at Bolton Crown Court and given a six-month driving ban and a £1000 fine. The conviction related to an incident that occurred on 2 March 2006 in the centre of Bolton, when Khan's car hit and broke the leg of a pedestrian who was using a pelican crossing while Khan was travelling at 47 mph in a 30 mph zone and overtaking in the wrong lane. He was cleared of dangerous driving but charged with the lesser offence of careless driving.

Khan was also summoned to appear in court in Rochdale on 26 October 2007, accused of travelling in excess of 140 mph on the M62 motorway on 31 December 2006. He failed to appear and the case was adjourned to 2 November 2007, with the District Judge warning that he would issue an arrest warrant if the accused did not appear by then. He was also charged with not producing his driving licence and insurance certificate. On 7 January 2008, Khan was fined £1000 and banned for 42 days for the speeding offence.

== Awards and honours ==
Khan was a 2005 nominee for the Laureus World Sports Awards for Breakthrough of the Year.

In 2007, he was named ESPN prospect of the year. His defeat of Marcos Maidana in 2010 was awarded Fight of the Year by the Boxing Writers Association of America. He was a nominee for the 2011 BBC Sports Personality of the Year Award after defeating Zab Judah.

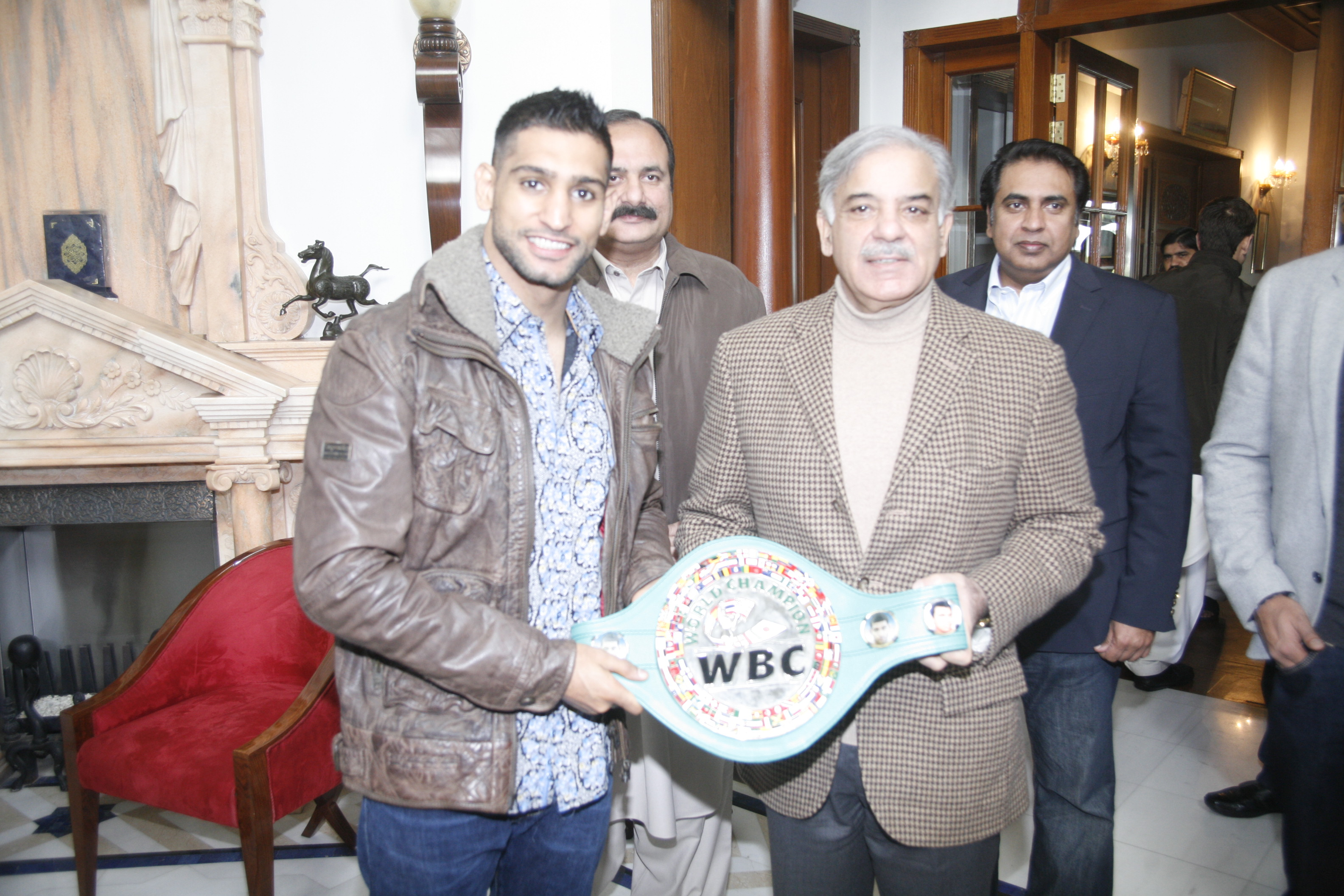
Khan with Pakistani CM Shehbaz Sharif in 2014

In January 2013, he was nominated for the Best at Sport award at the British Muslim Awards. In 2014, he was given Pride of Performance from the President of Pakistan.

In May 2024, he was given an honorary rank of Captain by the Pakistan Army: in a video shared on his Instagram account, Khan thanked the army for the honour. In September the same year, he received the Special Award for Philanthropy at the Asian Voice's Asian Achievers Awards for his charitable work and commitment to social causes through community-focused initiatives.

== Professional boxing record ==
| 40 fights | 34 wins | 6 losses |
|---|---|---|
| By knockout | 21 | 5 |
| By decision | 13 | 1 |

| No. | Result | Record | Opponent | Type | Round, time | Date | Location | Notes |
|---|---|---|---|---|---|---|---|---|
| 40 | Loss | 34–6 | Kell Brook | TKO | 6 (12), 0:51 | 19 Feb 2022 | AO Arena, Manchester, England | |
| 39 | Win | 34–5 | Billy Dib | TKO | 4 (12), 1:06 | 12 Jul 2019 | King Abdullah Sports City, Jeddah, Saudi Arabia | Won vacant WBC International welterweight title |
| 38 | Loss | 33–5 | Terence Crawford | TKO | 6 (12), 0:47 | 20 Apr 2019 | Madison Square Garden, New York City, New York, U.S. | For WBO welterweight title |
| 37 | Win | 33–4 | Samuel Vargas | UD | 12 | 8 Sep 2018 | Arena Birmingham, Birmingham, England | |
| 36 | Win | 32–4 | Phil Lo Greco | TKO | 1 (12), 0:39 | 21 Apr 2018 | Echo Arena, Liverpool, England | |
| 35 | Loss | 31–4 | Canelo Álvarez | KO | 6 (12), 2:37 | 7 May 2016 | T-Mobile Arena, Paradise, Nevada, US | For WBC and The Ring middleweight titles |
| 34 | Win | 31–3 | Chris Algieri | UD | 12 | 29 May 2015 | Barclays Center, New York City, New York, US | Retained WBC Silver welterweight title |
| 33 | Win | 30–3 | Devon Alexander | UD | 12 | 13 Dec 2014 | MGM Grand Garden Arena, Paradise, Nevada, US | Retained WBC Silver welterweight title |
| 32 | Win | 29–3 | Luis Collazo | UD | 12 | 3 May 2014 | MGM Grand Garden Arena, Paradise, Nevada, US | Won WBA International and vacant WBC Silver welterweight titles |
| 31 | Win | 28–3 | Julio Díaz | UD | 12 | 27 Apr 2013 | Motorpoint Arena, Sheffield, England | |
| 30 | Win | 27–3 | Carlos Molina | RTD | 10 (12), 3:00 | 15 Dec 2012 | Memorial Sports Arena, Los Angeles, California, US | Won vacant WBC Silver light-welterweight title |
| 29 | Loss | 26–3 | Danny García | TKO | 4 (12), 2:28 | 14 Jul 2012 | Mandalay Bay Events Center, Paradise, Nevada, US | Lost WBA (Super) light welterweight title; For WBC and vacant The Ring light-welterweight titles |
| 28 | Loss | 26–2 | Lamont Peterson | SD | 12 | 10 Dec 2011 | Walter E. Washington Convention Center, Washington, DC, US | Lost WBA (Super) and IBF light-welterweight titles; Khan later reinstated as WBA champion after Peterson failed a drug test |
| 27 | Win | 26–1 | Zab Judah | KO | 5 (12), 2:47 | 23 Jul 2011 | Mandalay Bay Events Center, Paradise, Nevada, US | Retained WBA (Super) light-welterweight title; Won IBF light-welterweight title |
| 26 | Win | 25–1 | Paul McCloskey | TD | 6 (12), 2:30 | 16 Apr 2011 | MEN Arena, Manchester, England | Retained WBA light-welterweight title; Unanimous TD: McCloskey cut from an accidental head clash |
| 25 | Win | 24–1 | Marcos Maidana | UD | 12 | 11 Dec 2010 | Mandalay Bay Events Center, Paradise, Nevada, US | Retained WBA light-welterweight title |
| 24 | Win | 23–1 | Paulie Malignaggi | TKO | 11 (12), 1:25 | 15 May 2010 | The Theater at Madison Square Garden, New York City, New York, US | Retained WBA light-welterweight title |
| 23 | Win | 22–1 | Dmitry Salita | TKO | 1 (12), 1:16 | 5 Dec 2009 | Metro Radio Arena, Newcastle, England | Retained WBA light-welterweight title |
| 22 | Win | 21–1 | Andreas Kotelnik | UD | 12 | 18 Jul 2009 | MEN Arena, Manchester, England | Won WBA light-welterweight title |
| 21 | Win | 20–1 | Marco Antonio Barrera | TD | 5 (12), 2:36 | 14 Mar 2009 | MEN Arena, Manchester, England | Retained WBA International lightweight title; Won vacant WBO Inter-Continental lightweight title; Unanimous TD: Barrera cut from an accidental head clash |
| 20 | Win | 19–1 | Oisin Fagan | TKO | 2 (12), 1:37 | 6 Dec 2008 | ExCeL, London, England | Won vacant WBA International lightweight title |
| 19 | Loss | 18–1 | Breidis Prescott | KO | 1 (12), 0:54 | 6 Sep 2008 | MEN Arena, Manchester, England | Lost WBO Inter-Continental lightweight title |
| 18 | Win | 18–0 | Michael Gomez | TKO | 5 (12), 2:33 | 21 Jun 2008 | National Indoor Arena, Birmingham, England | Retained Commonwealth lightweight title |
| 17 | Win | 17–0 | Martin Kristjansen | TKO | 7 (12), 2:53 | 5 Apr 2008 | Bolton Arena, Bolton, England | Won WBO Inter-Continental lightweight title |
| 16 | Win | 16–0 | Gairy St. Clair | UD | 12 | 2 Feb 2008 | ExCeL, London, England | Retained Commonwealth lightweight title |
| 15 | Win | 15–0 | Graham Earl | TKO | 1 (12), 1:12 | 8 Dec 2007 | Bolton Arena, Bolton, England | Retained Commonwealth lightweight title |
| 14 | Win | 14–0 | Scott Lawton | TKO | 4 (12), 0:32 | 6 Oct 2007 | Nottingham Arena, Nottingham, England | Retained Commonwealth lightweight title |
| 13 | Win | 13–0 | Willie Limond | RTD | 8 (12), 3:00 | 14 Jul 2007 | The O2 Arena, London, England | Won Commonwealth lightweight title |
| 12 | Win | 12–0 | Stefy Bull | TKO | 3 (8), 1:45 | 7 Apr 2007 | Millennium Stadium, Cardiff, Wales | |
| 11 | Win | 11–0 | Mohammed Medjadi | TKO | 1 (8), 0:55 | 17 Feb 2007 | Wembley Arena, London, England | |
| 10 | Win | 10–0 | Rachid Drilzane | UD | 10 | 9 Dec 2006 | ExCeL, London, England | |
| 9 | Win | 9–0 | Ryan Barrett | TKO | 1 (6), 1:51 | 2 Sep 2006 | Bolton Arena, Bolton, England | |
| 8 | Win | 8–0 | Colin Bain | TKO | 2 (6), 2:20 | 8 Jul 2006 | Millennium Stadium, Cardiff, Wales | |
| 7 | Win | 7–0 | Laszlo Komjathi | UD | 6 | 20 May 2006 | King's Hall, Belfast, Northern Ireland | |
| 6 | Win | 6–0 | Jackson Williams | TKO | 3 (6), 2:16 | 25 Feb 2006 | ExCeL, London, England | |
| 5 | Win | 5–0 | Vitali Martynov | TKO | 1 (6), 1:15 | 28 Jan 2006 | Nottingham Arena, Nottingham, England | |
| 4 | Win | 4–0 | Daniel Thorpe | TKO | 2 (4), 2:57 | 10 Dec 2005 | ExCeL, London, England | |
| 3 | Win | 3–0 | Steve Gethin | TKO | 3 (4), 0:49 | 5 Nov 2005 | Braehead Arena, Glasgow, Scotland | |
| 2 | Win | 2–0 | Baz Carey | UD | 4 | 10 Sep 2005 | International Arena, Cardiff, Wales | |
| 1 | Win | 1–0 | David Bailey | TKO | 1 (4), 1:49 | 16 Jul 2005 | Bolton Arena, Bolton, England | |

== Titles in boxing ==
=== Major world titles ===
- WBA (Super) light-welterweight champion (140 lbs)
- IBF light-welterweight champion (140 lbs)

=== Regional/International titles ===
- WBA International lightweight champion (135 lbs)
- WBO Inter-Continental lightweight champion (135 lbs)
- Commonwealth lightweight champion (135 lbs)
- WBC Silver interim light-welterweight champion (140 lbs)
- WBA International welterweight champion (147 lbs)
- WBC International welterweight champion (147 lbs)
- WBC Silver welterweight champion (147 lbs)

== Viewership ==
=== International ===
Amateur
| Date | Fight | Event | Network | Country | Viewership | Source |
|---|---|---|---|---|---|---|
| 16 August 2004 | Amir Khan vs. Marios Kaperonis | Athens Olympics | BBC | United Kingdom | 3,307,000 | |
| 20 August 2004 | Amir Khan vs. Dimitar Stilianov | Athens Olympics | BBC | United Kingdom | 6,486,000 | |
| 24 August 2004 | Amir Khan vs. Baik Jong-Sub | Athens Olympics (quarter-final) | BBC | United Kingdom | 5,070,000 | |
| 27 August 2004 | Amir Khan vs. Serik Yeleuov | Athens Olympics (semi-final) | BBC | United Kingdom | 8,383,000 | |
| 29 August 2004 | Amir Khan vs. Mario Kindelán | Athens Olympics (final) | BBC | United Kingdom | 8,000,000 | |
| 14 May 2005 | Amir Khan vs. Mario Kindelán | The Big Fight Live | ITV | United Kingdom | 6,300,000 | |
| | Total viewership | | | United Kingdom | 37,546,000 | |

Professional
| Date | Fight | Network | Region | Viewership | Source |
|---|---|---|---|---|---|
| 16 July 2005 | Amir Khan vs. David Bailey | ITV | United Kingdom | 4,400,000 | |
| 10 September 2005 | Amir Khan vs. Baz Carey | ITV | United Kingdom | 3,700,000 | |
| 10 December 2005 | Amir Khan vs. Daniel Thorpe | ITV | United Kingdom | 10,000,000 | |
| 2006 | The Big Fight Live (Amir Khan fight) | ITV | United Kingdom | 7,000,000 | |
| 14 July 2007 | Amir Khan vs. Willie Limond | ITV | United Kingdom | 3,899,000 | |
| 8 December 2007 | Amir Khan vs. Graham Earl | ITV | United Kingdom | 7,000,000 | |
| 2 February 2008 | Amir Khan vs. Gairy St. Clair | ITV | United Kingdom | 5,000,000 | |
| 5 April 2008 | Amir Khan vs. Martin Kristjansen | ITV | United Kingdom | 5,900,000 | |
| 21 June 2008 | Amir Khan vs. Michael Gomez | ITV | United Kingdom | 3,980,000 | |
| 15 May 2010 | Amir Khan vs. Paulie Malignaggi | | UK & US | 3,677,000 | |
| 15 May 2010 | Amir Khan vs. Paulie Malignaggi | HBO | United States | 1,228,000 | |
| 15 May 2010 | Amir Khan vs. Paulie Malignaggi | ITV | United Kingdom | 2,449,000 | |
| 11 December 2010 | Amir Khan vs. Marcos Maidana | | UK & US | 1,334,000 | |
| 11 December 2010 | Amir Khan vs. Marcos Maidana | HBO | United States | 1,170,000 | |
| 11 December 2010 | Amir Khan vs. Marcos Maidana | Sky Box Office (PPV) | United Kingdom | 164,000 | |
| 16 April 2011 | Amir Khan vs. Paul McCloskey | | UK & US | 1,400,000 | |
| 16 April 2011 | Amir Khan vs. Paul McCloskey | HBO | United States | 1,200,000 | |
| 16 April 2011 | Amir Khan vs. Paul McCloskey | Primetime (PPV) | United Kingdom | 200,000 | |
| 23 July 2011 | Amir Khan vs. Zab Judah | HBO | United States | 1,417,000 | |
| 10 December 2011 | Amir Khan vs. Lamont Peterson | | UK & US | 1,575,000 | |
| 10 December 2011 | Amir Khan vs. Lamont Peterson | HBO | United States | 1,300,000 | |
| 10 December 2011 | Amir Khan vs. Lamont Peterson | Sky Sports | United Kingdom | 275,000 | |
| 14 July 2012 | Amir Khan vs. Danny García | | UK & US | 1,767,000 | |
| 14 July 2012 | Amir Khan vs. Danny García | HBO | United States | 1,300,000 | |
| 14 July 2012 | Amir Khan vs. Danny García | Sky Sports | United Kingdom | 467,000 | |
| 15 December 2012 | Amir Khan vs. Carlos Molina | | UK & US | 738,000 | |
| 15 December 2012 | Amir Khan vs. Carlos Molina | HBO | United States | 616,000 | |
| 15 December 2012 | Amir Khan vs. Carlos Molina | Sky Sports | United Kingdom | 122,000 | |
| 27 April 2013 | Amir Khan vs. Julio Díaz | BoxNation | United Kingdom | 150,000 | |
| 13 December 2014 | Amir Khan vs. Devon Alexander | | UK & US | 1,132,000 | |
| 13 December 2014 | Amir Khan vs. Devon Alexander | Showtime | United States | 887,000 | |
| 13 December 2014 | Amir Khan vs. Devon Alexander | Sky Sports | United Kingdom | 245,000 | |
| 29 May 2015 | Amir Khan vs. Chris Algieri | Spike TV | United States | 1,120,000 | |
| 7 May 2016 | Canelo Álvarez vs. Amir Khan | | North America | 17,005,000 | |
| 7 May 2016 | Canelo Álvarez vs. Amir Khan | HBO | United States | 1,605,000 | |
| 7 May 2016 | Canelo Álvarez vs. Amir Khan | TV Azteca | Mexico | 15,400,000 | |
| 21 April 2018 | Amir Khan vs. Phil Lo Greco | Sky Sports | United Kingdom | 378,000 | |
| 8 September 2018 | Amir Khan vs. Samuel Vargas | Sky Sports | United Kingdom | 764,388 | |
| | Total viewership | | UK & North America | 82,918,388 | |

=== Pay-per-view bouts ===
United Kingdom
| No. | Date | Fight | Billing | Buys | Network | Revenue |
|---|---|---|---|---|---|---|
| 1 | 6 Dec 2008 | Khan vs. Prescott | Khan vs Prescott | 250,000 | Sky Box Office | £3,750,000 |
| 2 | 6 Sep 2008 | Khan vs. Fagan | Khan–Fagan | | Sky Box Office | |
| 3 | 14 Mar 2009 | Khan vs. Barrera | Khan vs. Barrera | | Sky Box Office | |
| 4 | 18 July 2009 | Khan vs. Kotelnik | Khan vs. Kotelnik | 100,000 | Sky Box Office | £1,500,000 |
| 5 | 5 Dec 2009 | Khan vs. Salita | Khan vs. Salita | | Sky Box Office | |
| 6 | 11 Dec 2010 | Khan vs. Maidana | Khan–Maidana | 164,000 | Sky Box Office | £2,452,000 |
| 7 | 16 April 2011 | Khan vs. McCloskey | England vs Ireland | 200,000 | Primetime | £2,990,000 |
| 8 | 19 Feb 2022 | Khan vs. Brook | Khan v Brook | 600,000 | Sky Box Office | £9,975,000 |
| | Total sales | | | 1,214,000 | | £20,667,000($35,778,681) |

United States
| No. | Date | Fight | Billing | Buys | Network | Revenue |
|---|---|---|---|---|---|---|
| 1 | 7 May 2016 | Canelo vs. Khan | Power vs. Speed | 600,000 | HBO | $36,000,000 |
| 2 | 20 April 2019 | Crawford vs. Khan | Crawford vs. Khan | 150,000 | ESPN | $10,500,000 |
| | Total sales | | | 750,000 | | $46,500,000 |

=== Other appearances ===
| Show / Event | Series | Date(s) | Network | Country | Viewership | Source(s) |
|---|---|---|---|---|---|---|
| Countdown | 57 | 2 November 2007 | Channel 4 | United Kingdom | 1,520,000 | |
| Beat the Star | 1 | 20 April 2008 | ITV | United Kingdom | 5,250,000 | |
| MOBO Awards | 2009 | 30 September 2009 | | Worldwide | 250,000,000 | |
| Who Wants to Be a Millionaire? | 28 | 19 December 2011 | ITV | United Kingdom | 4,620,000 | |
| Celebrity Juice | 8 | 27 September 2012 | ITV | United Kingdom | 2,846,000 | |
| Celebrity Juice | 10 | 29 August 2013 | ITV | United Kingdom | 1,871,000 | |
| I'm a Celebrity...Get Me Out of Here! | 17 | November 2017 | ITV | United Kingdom | 124,540,000 | (Note: See I'm a Celebrity...Get Me Out of Here! (UK series 17) § Ratings) |
| I'm a Celebrity...Get Me Out of Here! | 17 | December 2017 | ITV | United Kingdom | 94,640,000 | (Note: See I'm a Celebrity...Get Me Out of Here! (UK series 17) § Ratings) |
| Meet the Khans: Big in Bolton | 1 | 2021 | BBC | United Kingdom | | |
| Total viewership | | | | Worldwide | 485,287,000 | |

== Notes ==
Sporting positions
Regional boxing titles
| Preceded by Willie Limond | Commonwealth lightweight champion 14 July 2007 – 5 June 2009; Vacated | Vacant Title next held by Lee McAllister |
| Preceded by Martin Kristjansen | WBO Inter-Continental lightweight champion 5 April 2008 – 6 September 2008 | Succeeded by Breidis Prescott |
| New title | WBA International lightweight champion 6 December 2008 – 18 July 2009; Vacated | Vacant Title next held by Javier Castro |
| Vacant Title last held by Breidis Prescott | WBO Inter-Continental lightweight champion 14 March 2009 – 18 July 2009; Vacated | Vacant Title next held by Kevin Mitchell |
| New title | WBC Silver light-welterweight champion Interim title 15 December 2012 – 27 April 2013; Vacated | Vacant Title next held by Luca Giacon |
| Preceded by Luis Collazo | WBA International welterweight champion 3 May 2014 – 13 December 2014; Vacated | Vacant Title next held by Francisco Santana |
| Vacant Title last held by Luis Abregú | WBC Silver welterweight champion 3 May 2014 – 6 May 2016; Vacated | Vacant Title next held by Charles Manyuchi |
World boxing titles
| Preceded by Andreas Kotelnik | WBA light-welterweight champion 18 July 2009 – 23 July 2011; Promoted | Vacant Title next held by Ricky Burns |
| Vacant Title last held by Ricky Hatton | WBA light-welterweight champion Super title 23 July 2011 – 11 December 2011 | Succeeded by Lamont Peterson |
| Preceded by Zab Judah | IBF light-welterweight champion 23 July 2011 – 11 December 2011 | Succeeded by Lamont Peterson |
| Preceded by Lamont Peterson stripped | WBA light-welterweight champion Super title 11 July 2012 – 15 July 2012 | Succeeded by Danny García |
Awards
| Previous: Andre Berto | ESPN Prospect of the Year; 2007 | Next: Victor Ortiz |
| Previous: Juan Manuel Márquez vs. Juan Díaz | BWAA Fight of the Year vs. Marcos Maidana; 2010 | Next: Delvin Rodríguez vs. Paweł Wolak |
