= Amir Khan vs. Oisin Fagan =

Boxing match

Judgement Night
- Date: 6 December 2008
- Venue: ExCel, Newham, London, UK
- Title(s) on the line: vacant WBA International lightweight title

Tale of the tape
Boxer	Amir Khan	Oisin Fagan
Nickname	"King"	"Gael Force"
Hometown	Bolton, Greater Manchester, UK	Dublin, Leinster, Ireland
Pre-fight record	18–1 (14 KO)	22–5 (13 KO)
Age	21 years, 11 months	34 years, 11 months
Height	5 ft 8 1/2 in (174 cm)	5 ft 6 in (168 cm)
Weight	135 lb (61 kg)	134 1/2 lb (61 kg)
Style	Orthodox	Orthodox
Recognition	IBF; No. 13 Ranked Lightweight; WBO; No. 14 Ranked Lightweight; Commonwealth lightweight champion	Former Irish Light welterweight champion

Result
- Khan wins via 2nd-round TKO

Amir Khan vs. Oisin Fagan, billed as Judgement Night, was a professional boxing match contested between Commonwealth lightweight champion, Amir Khan, and Oisin Fagan. The bout took place on 6 December 2008 at the ExCel, with Khan winning by technical knockout in the second round.

== Background ==
On 6 September 2008, Khan suffered an upset first round knockout defeat against undefeated contender Breidis Prescott. Following the loss, Khan sacked trainer, Jorge Rubio, and replaced him with Freddie Roach. Khan began training with Roach at the Wild Card Gym in Los Angeles, training alongside stablemate Manny Pacquiao, reigning WBC lightweight champion and pound-for-pound No. 1, as he prepared for his return to the ring.

Fagan regained composure following a split decision loss against Verquan Kimbrough in December 2007, going on a 2-fight winning streak in 2008. Scoring a second-round TKO over Brian Carden in March, and a PTS victory over Konstantins Sakara in July.

On 30 October 2008, it was announced that Khan and Fagan would fight on 6 December 2008 at the ExCel in London, on the undercard of Nicky Cook's defence of his WBO super-featherweight title. It was later announced that Khan and Fagan would headline the event, live on Sky Sports Box Office, along with Oscar De La Hoya vs. Manny Pacquiao.

== Fight details ==
From the opening bell, Khan started fast, using his jab, with Fagan attempting to close the distance and apply pressure. Khan was warned once by referee Mickey Vann for a low blow in the first round. Towards the end of the round, Khan sent Fagan to the canvas with a right hand. Fagan made it to his made it to his feet, Khan connected with a series of punches, knocking Fagan down for a second time. Fagan went down once more in the final few seconds, but Vann ruled it a slip, moments before the bell ended the round. Khan and Fagan aggressively exchanged at the beginning of the second round. Halfway through, Fagan's corner threw in the towel, therefore giving Khan the win by TKO. Following the fight, it emerged that Fagan had suffered a fractured fibula during the first knockdown.

== Aftermath ==
Following Khan's win, in the post-fight interview, Khan's promoter, Frank Warren stated Khan's next fight would be in February. Khan credited his training team and expressed interest in a rematch with Prescott.

Khan defeated Kotelnik on 18 July, by unanimous decision to capture the WBA title, and became the third-youngest Brit to win a world title, at the age of 22.

== Fight card ==
Confirmed bouts:

Weight Class		vs.		Method	Round	Time	Notes
Lightweight	Amir Khan	def.	Oisin Fagan	TKO	2/12	1:37	^{Note 1}
Heavyweight	Martin Rogan	def.	Audley Harrison	PTS	10/10
Cruiserweight	Enzo Maccarinelli	def.	Mathew Ellis	TKO	2/10	1:28
Light-welterweight	Souleymane M'baye	def.	Barrie Jones	PTS	8/8
Light-middleweight	Anthony Small	def.	Steven Conway	TKO	2/8	0:28
Heavyweight	Derek Chisora	def.	Neil Simpson	RTD	2/8	3:00
Middleweight	Jamie Cox	def.	Ernie Smith	KO	1/6	3:08
Super-featherweight	Liam Walsh	def.	Youssef Al Hamidi	PTS	4/4
Super-bantamweight	Michael Walsh	def.	Delroy Spencer	RTD	2/4	3:00
Light-welterweight	Ryan Walsh	def.	Johnny Greaves	PTS	4/4

^Note 1 For vacant WBA International lightweight title

== Broadcasting ==
Country	Broadcaster
Country	PPV
United Kingdom	Sky Sports Box Office

Preceded by vs. Breidis Prescott	Amir Khan's bouts 6 December 2008	Succeeded by vs. Marco Antonio Barrera
Preceded by vs. Konstantins Sakara	Oisin Fagan's bouts 6 December 2008	Succeeded by vs. Asen Vasilev
