= Floyd Mayweather Jr. vs. Marcos Maidana =

Boxing match

The Moment
- Date: May 3, 2014
- Venue: MGM Grand Garden Arena, Paradise, Nevada, U.S.
- Title(s) on the line: WBA (Unified), WBC, and The Ring welterweight titles

Tale of the tape
Boxer	Floyd Mayweather Jr.	Marcos Maidana
Nickname	Money	El Chino ("The Chinaman")
Hometown	Grand Rapids, Michigan, U.S.	Margarita, Santa Fe, Argentina
Purse	$32,000,000	$1,500,000
Pre-fight record	45–0 (26 KO)	35–3 (31 KO)
Age	37 years, 2 months	30 years, 9 months
Height	5 ft 8 in (173 cm)	5 ft 7 in (170 cm)
Weight	146 lb (66 kg)	146 1/2 lb (66 kg)
Style	Orthodox	Orthodox
Recognition	WBC and The Ring; Welterweight Champion; WBA (Super), WBC, The Ring and TBRB; Light Middleweight Champion; TBRB; No. 1 Ranked Welterweight; The Ring No. 1 ranked pound-for-pound fighter 5-division world champion	WBA; Welterweight Champion; TBRB; No. 6 Ranked Welterweight; The Ring; No. 8 Ranked Welterweight

Result
- Mayweather Jr. wins by majority decision in 12 rounds (117–111, 116–112, 114–114)

Floyd Mayweather Jr. vs. Marcos Maidana, billed as The Moment, was a professional boxing match contested on May 3, 2014, for the WBA, WBC, and The Ring welterweight championship.

== Background ==
Following his Light middleweight unification against Canelo Álvarez in September 2013, Mayweather announced in March 2014 that he would next face WBA welterweight champion Marcos Maidana in May in order to unify the WBA, WBC and The Ring welterweight titles. It was to be held at the MGM Grand Garden Arena in Las Vegas, Nevada, United States and broadcast on Showtime PPV. There had been interest in a bout with Amir Khan.

Maidana won the WBA title in December 2013 against Mayweather's friend, Adrien Broner. Mayweather explained why he chose Maidana, "Marcos Maidana's last performance immediately brought him to my attention. He is an extremely skilled fighter who brings knockout danger to the ring. I think this is a great fight for me and he deserves the opportunity to see if he can do what 45 others have tried to do before him – beat me."

Maidana was a 12 to 1 underdog going into the fight.

=== Fight purses ===
Guaranteed fight purses: Over $37 million total (including most expensive undercard in pay-per-view history, as of May 2014)

Headline

- Floyd Mayweather ($32,000,000) vs. Marcos Maidana ($1,500,000)

Undercard

- Amir Khan ($1,500,000) vs. Luis Collazo ($300,000)
- Adrien Broner ($500,000) vs. Carlos Molina ($100,000)

== The fights ==
=== Broner vs. Molina ===
The second fight on the PPV card saw former 3-division world champion Adrien Broner return from his first career loss against fringe contender Carlos Molina, who hadn't fought since a loss to Amir Khan in December 2012. The 10 round bout would also be Broner's first professional fight as a light welterweight.

Broner was looking for a rematch with Maidana, claiming that when Maidana lost to Mayweather, he would have to rematch him. Broner was paid $1.25 million and Molina had a $150,000 purse.

==== The fight ====
Broner, usually flashy and charismatic, fought the bout with less showboating, looking for a clear win. Broner was the aggressor and landed jabs frequently. Molina was game, throwing body shots and attacking Broner's left shoulder, then attempting to come over the top with his right hand, both in the middle of the ring and with Broner on the ropes. Molina also attempted to counter punch Broner and get inside, as Broner had superior reach, Molina had only limited success.

Broner outworked Molina winning the fight via unanimous decision. The three judges scored the fight 100–90, 99–91, and 98–92 in his favour. ESPN scored the fight 99–91 for Broner.

==== Aftermath ====
After the fight, Broner took to the microphone and said, "It was a comeback fight and shook the cobwebs off. As you can see I really didn't go through no trouble. It was a sparring match. [The loss] definitely humbled me in some ways but I'm still Adrien 'The Problem' Broner and anyone can get it."

Preceded by vs. Marcos Maidana	Adrien Broner's bouts 3 May 2014	Succeeded by vs. Emanuel Taylor
Preceded by vs. Amir Khan	Carlos Molina's bouts 3 May 2014	Succeeded by vs. Mercito Gesta

=== Khan vs. Collazo ===
The Moment:Amir Khan vs. Luis Collazo
- Title(s) on the line: WBA International and vacant WBC Silver welterweight titles

Tale of the tape
Boxer	Amir Khan	Luis Collazo
Nickname	"King"	"God's Way"
Hometown	Bolton, Greater Manchester, UK	Brooklyn, New York, U.S.
Purse	$1,500,000	$350,000
Pre-fight record	28–3 (19 KO)	35–5 (18 KO)
Age	27 years, 4 months	33 years
Height	5 ft 8 1/2 in (174 cm)	5 ft 9 in (175 cm)
Weight	147 lb (67 kg)	147 lb (67 kg)
Style	Orthodox	Southpaw
Recognition	WBC; No. 2 Ranked Welterweight; WBA; No. 4 Ranked Welterweight; The Ring; No. 3 Ranked Light Welterweight; TBRB; No. 4 Ranked Light Welterweight; Former light welterweight champion	WBA; No. 2 Ranked Welterweight; WBC; No. 8 Ranked Welterweight; Former welterweight champion

Result
- Khan defeats Collazo by unanimous decision

The co featured bout saw former world champions Amir Khan and Luis Collazo face off in a WBA welterweight title eliminator.

The fight was announced on 24 March. Khan came into the bout after just over a year's absence from ring.

Khan's purse for the fight was $1.5m while Collazo earned $350,000.

==== The fight ====
Khan was too fast and too disciplined for Collazo, flooring him in the fourth round and twice in the tenth. Khan and Collazo both incurred point deductions in round eight. Collazo hit Khan with a low blow while Khan was holding his head down. Collazo's failed approach resulted in a mismatch on the scorecards. Collazo fought with his hands down most of the night, unafraid of Khan, believing Khan had no power and he would eventually knock him out.

The judges scored the fight 119–104, and 117–106 twice in Khan's favour.

==== Aftermath ====
In the post-fight interview in the ring, Khan credited his twelve months of boxing training with Virgil Hunter for his success.

Preceded by vs. Julio Díaz	Amir Khan's bouts 3 May 2014	Succeeded by vs. Devon Alexander
Preceded by vs. Victor Ortiz	Luis Collazo's bouts 3 May 2014	Succeeded by vs. Chris Degollado

=== Main Event ===
Maidana came out aggressively and maintained that stance throughout the fight forcing Mayweather to engage. Many times in the fight Maidana threw shots at different angles, forcing Mayweather against the ropes.

Mayweather would win the highly contested fight by majority decision. Judge Michael Pernick scored the fight 114–114, a draw. Judge Dave Moretti had it 116–112, and Burt A. Clements scored it 117–111.

CompuBox revealed that Mayweather was hit more times than any of his previous 38 bouts that have been covered by them. Mayweather landed 230 of his 426 punches thrown (54%) while Maidana landed 221 of 858 (26%).

== Aftermath ==
According to Mayweather in the post-fight interview, Maidana's aggressive approach made him change his style of fighting. There were calls for an immediate rematch. Mayweather said, "He put pressure on me and that's when I decided to fight differently," Mayweather said. "I stood there and fought him. He's a good fighter, I take nothing away from him [...] This was a tough, competitive fight. This is what fans want to see. "I want to give fans an exciting fight. Normally, I box and move. Tonight, I gave fans an exciting fight."

Maidana felt he won the fight, believing he gave Mayweather his toughest fight ever.Speaking through a translator, he said, "I definitely think I won. Floyd had never been hit by a man before. I had to change the gloves [after a last-minute problem with his original gloves on Friday] and I still gave him a great fight. He did dominate some rounds but the majority, I dominated them."

The fight generated around 900,000 PPV buys, although exact figures were not released by Showtime. The revenue of PPV sale amounted to $58 million.

The two fought again later that year where Mayweather won again.

=== Reception ===
The fight was sold out, grossing US$15 million at the live gate, the fourth highest of any boxing event in Las Vegas. It sold an estimated 900,000 buys on pay-per-view, the year's highest-selling PPV up until May 2014, grossing an estimated $63 million in pay-per-view revenue, bringing the event's total revenue to an estimated $78 million.

== Fight card ==
Confirmed bouts:

Weight Class		vs.		Method	Round	Time	Notes
Welterweight	Floyd Mayweather Jr. (c)	def.	Marcos Maidana	MD	12/12		^{Note 1}
Welterweight	Amir Khan	def.	Luis Collazo	UD	12/12		^{Note 2}
Light welterweight	Adrien Broner	def.	Carlos Molina	UD	10/10
Super middleweight	J'Leon Love	def.	Marco Antonio Peribán	UD	10/10
Preliminary bouts
Cruiserweight	Andrew Tabiti	def.	John Shipman	TKO	5/6	2:11
Light welterweight	Ronald Gavril	def.	Tyrell Hendrix	TKO	3/8	1:58
Middleweight	Anthony Ogogo	def.	Jonel Tapia	TKO	3/8	0:46
Welterweight	Ashley Theophane	def.	Angino Perez	TKO	4/8	2:44
Super middleweight	Lanell Bellows	def.	Thomas Gifford	TKO	2/6	1:17
Welterweight	Ladarius Miller	def.	Richard Colas	TKO	3/4	0:58

^Note 1 For WBC, WBA & The Ring welterweight titles
^Note 2 For WBA International and WBC Silver welterweight titles

== Broadcasting ==
Country	Broadcaster
Argentina	TV Pública Digital
Australia	Main Event
Panama	RPC-TV
United Kingdom	BoxNation
United States	Showtime PPV

Preceded by vs. Canelo Álvarez	Floyd Mayweather Jr.'s bouts 3 May 2014	Succeeded by Rematch
Preceded by vs. Adrien Broner	Marcos Maidana's bouts 3 May 2014	Succeeded by Rematch
