= Amir Khan vs. Paul McCloskey =

Boxing competition

King Khan Returns
- Date: 16 April 2011
- Venue: Manchester Arena, Manchester, UK
- Title(s) on the line: WBA Light Welterweight Title

Tale of the tape
Boxer	(United Kingdom) Amir Khan	(United Kingdom) / (Republic of Ireland) Paul McCloskey
Nickname	"King"	"Dudey"
Hometown	Bolton, Greater Manchester	Derry, Northern Ireland
Pre-fight record	24–1 (17 KO)	22–0 (12 KO)
Age	24 years, 4 months	31 years, 8 months
Height	5 ft 8 1/2 in (174 cm)	5 ft 8 in (173 cm)
Weight	139 lb (63 kg)	139 lb (63 kg)
Style	Orthodox	Southpaw
Recognition	WBA; Light Welterweight Champion; The Ring; No. 2 Ranked Light Welterweight	WBA; No. 4 Ranked Light Welterweight; The Ring; No. 10 Ranked Light Welterweight

Result
- Khan defeats McCloskey by Technical Decision

Amir Khan vs. Paul McCloskey was a professional boxing match contested on 16 April 2011, for the WBA Light Welterweight championship.

It was aired on HBO's World Championship Boxing, as part of an HBO-televised split-site double-header, which also included WBC Welterweight Championship fight, Andre Berto vs. Victor Ortiz.

== Background ==
Khan survived a brutal late onslaught from Marcos Maidana to retain his WBA light-welterweight title in December 2010. It was looking like an easy night's work in round one. Khan dropped Maidana with a vicious left to the body that had the Argentinian writhing in agony. During round 10, was where that Maidana had much of his success, threading huge uppercuts through his tight guard and ripping shots to his ribs on both flanks in a vain effort to bring his gloves down. He won the bout unanimous decision. Khan had two 10–8 rounds, the first and the fifth, when the referee Joe Cortez docked Maidana a point for elbowing on the break.

McCloskey produced a classy European light-welterweight title defence as he stopped Scotland's Barry Morrison in seven rounds. The Dungiven man picked off Morrison in the opening rounds in Letterkenny and then put the ex-British champion on the canvas with a big right in the fifth. Morrison tried to get McCloskey involved in a brawl but the end came after another knockdown in the seventh. It was McCloskey's second defence of his title and his 22nd straight win. Morrison had no answer to McCloskey's fast hands and the Derry man showed punching power as well with his right hook in the fifth which caught the Scot flush on the temple.

== The fight ==
The fight started with Khan as the main aggressor with little changing for five rounds. McCloskey evaded a lot of Khan's punches with superb upper body movement but he was not throwing enough punches to win rounds. In the decisive sixth Khan staggered McCloskey and moments later the pair went toe-to-toe, clashing heads as Khan came in for a right hand, McCloskey and Khan both stopped and the referee intervened. The fight was then stopped because of a cut to McCloskey's left eye.

Khan had some trouble with an awkward and resilient southpaw, who was difficult to hit cleanly, however, he ended up winning all six rounds on all three cards.

== Aftermath ==
There was some controversy over the stoppage, with The Independent's Steve Bunce questioning the doctor's reason for entering the ring

== Undercard ==
Confirmed bouts:

=== Televised ===
- Light-Welterweight Championship bout: (United Kingdom) Amir Khan vs. (Republic of Ireland) Paul McCloskey
  - Khan defeats McCloskey by technical decision in round 6. (60–54, 60–54,60–54)
- Middleweight bout: (United Kingdom) Martin Murray vs. (Brazil) John Anderson Carvalho
  - Murray defeats Carvalho by TKO at 2:20 in round 4.
- Welterweight bout: (United Kingdom) Craig Watson vs. (United Kingdom) Lee Purdy
  - Purdy defeats Watson by TKO at 0:40 in round 5.

=== Preliminary card ===
- Super Bantamweight bout: (United Kingdom) Rendall Munroe vs. (Belarus) Andrei Isaeu
  - Munroe defeats Isaeu by unanimous decision. (116–112, 115–114, 117–112)
- Lightweight bout: (United Kingdom) Graeme Higginson vs. (Republic of Ireland) Andy Murray
  - Murray defeated Higginson by points.
- Heavyweight bout: (United Kingdom) Richard Towers vs. (Belarus) Raman Sukhaterin
  - Towers defeats Sukhaterin by RTD. The fight was stopped at the end of round four.
- Super Bantamweight bout: (United Kingdom) Kid Galahad vs. (United Kingdom) Dai Davies
  - Galahad defeated Davies by points.
- Bantamweight bout: (United Kingdom) Tasif Khan vs. (Latvia) Pavels Senkovs
  - Khan defeated Senkovs by points.

== International broadcasting ==
Country	Broadcaster
Latin America	Space
Canada	HBO Canada/TSN
Philippines	TV5/IBC
United Kingdom	Primetime
United States	HBO

Preceded by vs. Marcos Maidana	Amir Khan's bouts 16 April 2011	Succeeded by vs. Zab Judah
Preceded by vs. Barry Morrison	Paul McCloskey's bouts 16 April 2011	Succeeded by vs. Breidis Prescott
