= Richar =

Richar is a surname and given name. Notable people with the name include:

- Count Richar (died 972), Lotharingian count
- Danny Richar (born 1983), Dominican baseball player
- Richar Abril (born 1982), Cuban boxer
