= Jorge Rubio =

Jorge Rubio may refer to:

- Jorge Rubio (boxing trainer), Cuban trainer
- Jorge Rubio (baseball) (1945–2020), Major League Baseball pitcher
