= Amir Khan vs. Zab Judah =

Boxing match

Attack & Conquer
- Date: July 23, 2011
- Venue: Mandalay Bay Resort & Casino, Las Vegas, U.S.
- Title(s) on the line: WBA (Super) and IBF light welterweight titles

Tale of the tape
| Boxer | (United Kingdom) Amir Khan | (United States) Zab Judah |
| Nickname | "King" | "Super" |
| Hometown | Bolton, Greater Manchester, UK | Brooklyn, New York, U.S. |
| Purse | $1,072,500 | $500,000 |
| Pre-fight record | 25–1 (17 KO) | 41–6 (28 KO) |
| Age | 24 years, 7 months | 33 years, 8 months |
| Height | 5 ft 8 1/2 in (174 cm) | 5 ft 7 in (170 cm) |
| Weight | 140 lb (64 kg) | 140 lb (64 kg) |
| Style | Orthodox | Southpaw |
| Recognition | WBA; Light Welterweight Champion; The Ring; No. 2 Ranked Light Welterweight | IBF; Light Welterweight Champion; The Ring; No. 6 Ranked Light Welterweight; 2-division world champion Former welterweight undisputed champion |

Result
- Khan defeats Judah by 5th round Knockout

Amir Khan vs. Zab Judah, billed as Attack & Conquer, was a professional boxing match contested on July 23, 2011 for the WBA (Super) and IBF light welterweight championship.

== Background ==
On 31 May 2011, Khan agreed to fight 33-year-old two-weight champion Zab Judah in attempt to unify the WBA, and IBF light-welterweight titles in Las Vegas on 23 July. Judah had reclaimed the IBF title two months earlier against Kaizer Mabuza. Khan was unhappy that a fight with WBC and WBO champion Timothy Bradley could not be made saying, "Bradley was the guy I wanted to fight but he chickened out. I offered him 50% of UK revenue, which is unheard of, and 50% of all revenue in America, that's how much I wanted to fight him, but he didn't want it."

Amir Khan and Zab Judah started the build-up via a war of words on Twitter.

At the weigh-in Khan and Judah both made weight weighing in on the 140 lbs limit.

== The fight ==
Amir Khan started the fight with a left jab. Round 1 saw a busy Amir Khan as he fought from the outside and kept Judah away with jabs and straights. All four rounds were taken by Khan. Ultimately on the 5th round Zab was taken down with a right uppercut to the body, in which at first commentators believed it was a low blow, since Judah was showing signs of agonizing pain, but when it was seen from a different camera angle, it was right on the belt, leading to a Knockout for Amir Khan.

== Aftermath ==
He held the IBF and WBA Light Welterweight titles until a controversial defeat at the hands of Lamont Peterson.

== Main card ==
Confirmed bouts:

- Junior Welterweight Championship bout (United Kingdom) Amir Khan vs. (United States) Zab Judah
  - Khan defeats Judah via knockout at 2:47 of fifth round, unifying WBA and IBF 140-lbs titles.
- Middleweight bout (United States) Peter Quillin vs. (United States) Jason LeHoullier
  - Quillin defeats LeHoullier via technical knockout at 1:38 of fifth round

=== Untelevised ===
- Featherweight bout (United States) Gary Russell Jr. vs. (United States) Eric Estrada
  - Russell Jr. defeats Estrada via unanimous decision. (80-71, 80-71, 80-71)
- Middleweight bout (United States) James Kirkland vs. (United States) Alexis Hloros
  - Kirkland defeats Hloros via technical knockout at 0:25 of second round
- Featherweight bout (United States) Ronny Rios vs. (Mexico) Noe Lopez Jr.
  - Rios defeated Lopez Jr. via technical knockout at 1:12 of first round
- Super Middleweight bout (United States) Josiah Judah vs. (United States) Rafael Jastrzebski
  - Judah defeats Jastrzebski via majority decision. (59-55, 58-56, 57-57)
- Heavyweight bout (United States) Bryant Jennings vs. (United States) Theron Johnson
  - Jennings defeats Johnson via unanimous decision. (60-53, 59-54, 60-53)
- Lightweight bout (Republic of Ireland) Jamie Kavanagh vs. (United States) Marcos Herrera
  - Kavanagh defeats Herrera via unanimous decision. (59-54, 60-54, 60-53)

== Reported fight earnings ==
- US earnings: Amir Khan ($1,072,500) vs. Zab Judah ($500,000)
- UK earnings: Amir Khan (share of UK pay-per-view earnings)
- US viewership: 1.417 million

== International broadcasting ==
The fight was televised on the pay-per-view channel Primetime (UK) with commentary on BBC Radio 5 Live and BBC Sport website and HBO.

| Country | Broadcaster |
|---|---|
| Australia | Main Event |
| Czech Republic | Sport 1 |
| Hungary | Sport 2 |
| Indonesia | tvOne |
| Italy | Sportitalia |
| Latin America | Space |
| Malaysia | Astro |
| New Zealand | Sky |
| Pakistan | Geo TV |
| Philippines | AKTV |
| Poland | Polsat Sport |
| Portugal | Sport TV |
| Qatar | Al Jazeera Sports |
| Romania | Sport.ro |
| Russia | NTV Plus |
| South Africa | SuperSport |
| United Kingdom | Primetime |
| United States | HBO |

| Preceded by vs. Paul McCloskey | Amir Khan's bouts 23 July 2011 | Succeeded by vs. Lamont Peterson |
| Preceded by vs. Kaizer Mabuza | Zab Judah's bouts 23 July 2011 | Succeeded by vs. Vernon Paris |
