= Martin Kristjansen =

Danish boxer (born 1977)

Personal information
- Nationality: (Denmark) Danish
- Born: Martin Kristjansen; 12 November 1977 (age 48) Slagelse, Denmark
- Height: 1.74 m (5 ft 9 in)
- Weight: Lightweight

Boxing career
- Stance: Orthodox

Boxing record
- Total fights: 27
- Wins: 21
- Win by KO: 6
- Losses: 2
- Draws: 4
- No contests: 0

Martin Kristjansen (born 12 November 1977) is a Danish lightweight boxer from Slagelse, Denmark. He is a former WBO inter-continental lightweight champion.

Kristjansen was ranked first in the WBO Lightweight rankings when he fought the third ranked British Lightweight Amir Khan on 5 April 2008 in a title eliminator. After an onslaught from Khan in the seventh round, the referee stopped the fight with the Dane unable to defend himself.
