= Marios Kaperonis =

Greek boxer

Personal information
- Full name: Μάριος Καπερώνης
- Nationality: Greek
- Born: 17 February 1983 (age 43) Patras, Dytiki Ellada
- Height: 1.73 m (5 ft 8 in)
- Weight: 60 kg (130 lb)

Sport
- Sport: Boxing
- Weight class: Lightweight
- Club: EA Patra

Marios Kaperonis (born 17 February 1983) is a Greek former amateur boxer. He lost in the first round of 2004 Summer Olympics in the men's lightweight division (– 60 kg) to eventual silver medalist Amir Khan from Great Britain.
