= Meet the Khans: Big in Bolton =

British reality television series

- Genre: Reality television
- Directed by: Josh Jacobs
- Starring: Amir Khan; Faryal Makhdoom
- Country of origin: United Kingdom
- Original language: English
- No. of seasons: 3
- No. of episodes: 19

Production
- Executive producers: Nav Raman; Ali Quirk
- Production locations: Bolton; Manchester; London; Dubai; New York
- Running time: 23-28 minutes
- Production company: Chatterbox Media

Original release
- Network: BBC Three
- Release: March 29, 2021 – January 9, 2023

Meet the Khans: Big in Bolton is a British reality television series, aired on BBC Three and released on-demand on BBC iPlayer. The series focuses on the lives of British-Pakistani boxer Amir Khan and his Pakistani-American wife Faryal Makhdoom in the British town of Bolton.

== Background ==
On 31 May 2013, Khan married Faryal Makhdoom at the Waldorf Astoria in New York City. The couple then flew back to Khan's hometown of Bolton where a second celebration, a traditional Walima, took place in Manchester, which included 4,000 guests. They have two daughters. On 4 August 2017, Amir announced that he and Faryal had agreed to split. In November 2017, photos emerged of Khan and his wife together. Khan later stated that he and his wife had reconciled. This split and subsequent reunion is focused on in the show.

In September 2013, Khan stated his plans to 'make Bolton better', by investing £5 million into a wedding and banqueting hall in Washington Street, Deane. Original plans were to be ready within 18 months, with an all glass front. On 23 November 2016 Khan made an announcement of the other businesses that would open alongside the banqueting hall, This included FMK make-up shop run by his wife Faryal, Argeela Lounge shisha bar and restaurant, British-Asian curry firm My Lahore, another buffet restaurant and coffee shop. The loss of finances and subsequent handover of the project by Khan to his wife are depicted in the series. In March 2021, Khan announced his first-ever signing, Tal Singh, who he hopes to guide towards a historic world title triumph.

== Episodes ==
=== Series 1 ===
No.	Title	Directed by	Original release date
1	"Episode 1"	Josh Jacobs	March 29, 2021
2	"Episode 2"	Josh Jacobs	March 29, 2021
3	"Episode 3"	Josh Jacobs	March 29, 2021
4	"Episode 4"	Josh Jacobs	March 29, 2021
5	"Episode 5"	Josh Jacobs	March 29, 2021
6	"Episode 6"	Josh Jacobs	March 29, 2021
7	"Episode 7"	Josh Jacobs	March 29, 2021
8	"Episode 8"	Josh Jacobs	March 29, 2021

=== Series 2 ===
No.	Title	Directed by	Original release date
1	"Episode 1"	Josh Jacobs	April 28, 2022
2	"Episode 2"	Josh Jacobs	April 28, 2022
3	"Episode 3"	Josh Jacobs	April 28, 2022
4	"Episode 4"	Josh Jacobs	April 28, 2022
5	"Episode 5"	Josh Jacobs	April 28, 2022
6	"Episode 6"	Josh Jacobs	April 28, 2022

=== Series 3 ===
No.	Title	Directed by	Original release date
1	"Episode 1"	Josh Jacobs	January 9, 2023
2	"Episode 2"	Josh Jacobs	January 9, 2023
3	"Episode 3"	Josh Jacobs	January 9, 2023
4	"Episode 4"	Josh Jacobs	January 9, 2023
5	"Episode 5"	Josh Jacobs	January 9, 2023

== Reception ==
Journalist Emily Baker of i news praised the show as a "transparent attempt at a rebrand" for the Khans and "incredibly fun to watch", as well as lauding the shows's depiction of Faryal Makhdoom as a "smart, hands-on and caring woman".
