= Virgil Hunter =

American boxer

Personal information
- Nationality: United States
- Born: Virgil Hunter Berkeley, California, United States
- Occupation: Boxing trainer

Virgil Hunter is an American boxing coach. He was selected to receive the Futch–Condon Award for the 2011 Trainer of the Year by the Boxing Writers Association of America (BWAA). He is the biological father of American singer Keyshia Cole whom he met in May 2016.

Hunter has trained world champions Alfredo Angulo, Nicola Adams, Andre Berto, Andre Ward, Abner Mares, Amir Khan and Mario Barrios, as well as Tony Yoka and Joshua Buatsi.
