= Adverse analytical finding =

An adverse analytical finding (AAF), also known as a testing positive, occurs when a laboratory accredited by the World Anti-Doping Agency (WADA) "identifies the presence of a prohibited substance and/or its metabolites or markers in a sample". A related concept is the atypical finding (ATF) when the result is inconclusive, a category introduced in 2008. Not all AAFs result in anti-doping sanctions; the rate varies by sport. In athletics, the rate of AAFs does not vary significantly by event and averages 0.95 percent of samples analyzed. However, sprinters were more likely to test positive for anabolic steroids while middle- and long-distance runners were more likely to test positive for peptides and growth factors.
