= Carlos Molina (American boxer) =

American boxer

Personal information
- Born: November 18, 1985 (age 40) Commerce, California, U.S.
- Height: 1.66 m (5 ft 5 1/2 in)
- Weight: 138.5

Boxing career
- Reach: 68 in (173 cm)
- Stance: Orthodox

Boxing record
- Total fights: 21
- Wins: 17
- Win by KO: 7
- Losses: 2
- Draws: 2

Carlos Molina (born November 18, 1985) is an American professional boxer. He is also the brother of two Olympic Boxers (Twins) Javier for the U.S. and Oscar who fights for Mexico.

== Amateur career ==
Molina's amateur career ended with a record of 105-20.

== Professional career ==
On the same Showtime boxing card of Márquez-Vázquez IV, Carlos scored a decision win over veteran Humberto Tapia. Carlos suffered his first professional defeat from British boxer Amir Khan in December 2012.

=== Professional boxing record ===
17 Wins (7 knockouts), 2 Losses (1 knockout), 2 Draws
| Res. | Record | Opponent | Type | Rd., Time | Date | Location | Notes |
| Draw | 17-2-2 | (Philippines) Mercito Gesta | SD | 10 | April 30, 2015 | (United States) Fantasy Springs Casino, Indio, California | |
| Loss | 17-2-1 | (United States) Adrien Broner | UD | 10 | May 3, 2014 | (United States) MGM Grand, Las Vegas, Nevada | For vacant WBA International Super Lightweight title. |
| Loss | 17-1-1 | (United Kingdom) Amir Khan | RTD | 10 (12), 3:00 | December 15, 2012 | (United States) Los Angeles Memorial Sports Arena, Los Angeles, California | For vacant WBC Interim Silver Light Welterweight title. |
| Win | 17-0-1 | (Dominican Republic) Marcos Leonardo Jimenez | UD | 10 | June 16, 2012 | (United States) Convention Center, McAllen, Texas | Won vacant WBO Inter-Continental Lightweight title. |
| Win | 16-0-1 | (United States) Angino Perez | UD | 10 | March 17, 2012 | (United States) Convention Center, Pharr, Texas | |
| Win | 15-0-1 | (Mexico) Manuel Leyva | UD | 10 | December 3, 2011 | Honda Center Anaheim, California, United States | |
| Draw | 14-0-1 | (Mexico) Juan Montiel | SD | 8 | August 13, 2011 | (United States) The Joint, Las Vegas, Nevada | |
| Win | 14-0 | (Puerto Rico) John Figueroa | UD | 8 | November 18, 2010 | (United States) Club Nokia, Los Angeles, California | |
| Win | 13-0 | (Philippines) Glenn Gonzales | RTD | 5 (8), 3:00 | August 13, 2010 | (United States) Sports Arena, Pico Rivera, California | |
| Win | 12-0 | (Mexico) Humberto Tapia | UD | 8 | May 22, 2010 | (United States) Staples Center, Los Angeles, California | |
| Win | 11-0 | (The Bahamas) Hensley Strachan | UD | 4 | February 25, 2010 | (United States) Club Nokia, Los Angeles, California | |
| Win | 10-0 | (United States) Tyler Ziolkowski | TKO | 1 (6), 0:54 | January 29, 2010 | (United States) Hard Rock Hotel and Casino, Las Vegas, Nevada | |
| Win | 9-0 | (United States) Antony Nelson | KO | 1 (4), (2:13) | August 27, 2009 | (United States) Club Nokia, Los Angeles, California | |
| Win | 8-0 | (Colombia) Ever Luis Perez | TKO | 4 (4), (2:39) | July 30, 2009 | (United States) Club Nokia, Los Angeles, California | |
| Win | 7-0 | (Nicaragua) Anthony Martinez | UD | 6 | May 21, 2009 | (United States) Hard Rock Hotel, San Diego, California | |
| Win | 6-0 | (United States) Genier Pit | KO | 4 (4), (2:17) | December 12, 2008 | (United States) Alameda Swap Meet, Los Angeles, California | |
| Win | 5-0 | (Mexico) Eligio Valenzuela | TKO | 4 (4), (1:41) | October 17, 2008 | (United States) Quiet Cannon, Montebello, California | |
| Win | 4-0 | (Mexico) Ramon Flores | TKO | 2 (4), (2:47) | July 30, 2008 | (United States) Sycuan Resort & Casino, El Cajon, California | |
| Win | 3-0 | (Mexico) Odilon Rivera | UD | 4 | June 19, 2008 | (United States) Marriott Hotel, Irvine, California | |
| Win | 2-0 | (Mexico) Ricardo Martinez | UD | 4 | August 18, 2007 | (United States) Soboba Casino, San Jacinto, California | |
| Win | 1-0 | (United States) Mario Juarez | UD | 4 | May 25, 2007 | (United States) Doubletree Hotel, Ontario, California | |

Awards and achievements
| Vacant Title last held by Kevin Mitchell | WBO Inter-Continental Lightweight Champion; June 16, 2012 – June 29, 2013; Vacated | Vacant Title next held by Anthony Crolla |
