= Breidis Prescott =

Colombian boxer (born 1983)

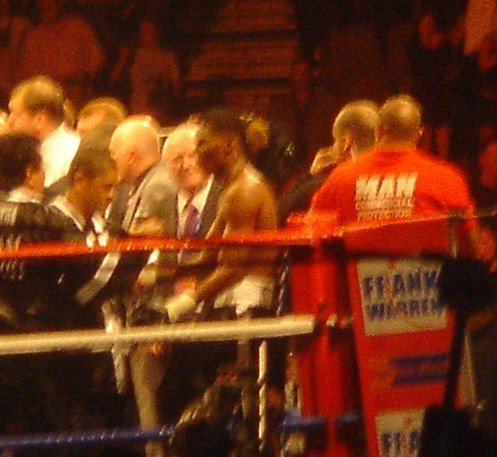

Personal information
- Born: Breidis Enrique Prescott Consuegra; May 3, 1983 (age 43) Barranquilla, Atlántico, Colombia
- Height: 5 ft 11 in (180 cm)
- Weight: Lightweight; Light welterweight; Welterweight

Boxing career
- Reach: 72 in (183 cm)
- Stance: Orthodox

Boxing record
- Total fights: 50
- Wins: 31
- Win by KO: 22
- Losses: 19

Breidis Enrique Prescott Consuegra (born May 3, 1983) is a Colombian professional boxer. In his early career, he had a reputation as a formidable puncher, winning 18 of his first 20 fights by knockout. In 2008, Prescott first became known on the world stage when he upset heavily favoured and then-undefeated Olympian Amir Khan.

== Amateur career ==
As an amateur, Prescott represented Colombia at the 2003 Pan American Games, where he was stopped in the first round by Lucas Matthysse of Argentina. In 2022, Prescott went back to amateur boxing and tried to win the WBL welterweight title which after three rounds was defeated by Richard Willows by unanimous decision.

== Professional career ==
Prescott made his professional debut on July 1, 2005, stopping Oscar Pineda in the first round. In his next seventeen fights, Prescott would win all but one by knockout or stoppage. On June 27, 2008, Prescott made his United States debut against Richar Abril, winning a ten-round split decision. Prescott would make headlines on September 6, when he travelled to England to face 2004 Olympic silver medalist Amir Khan. In a major upset, Prescott knocked Khan out in less than a minute into the first round to win his first regional championship, the WBO Inter-Continental lightweight title.

2009 was not as successful for Prescott, despite continuing to garner worldwide exposure to boxing audiences. On February 20, he defeated Humberto Toledo after the latter was disqualified in the tenth and final round for biting Prescott on the shoulder. On July 17, Miguel Vázquez handed Prescott his first professional loss by frustrating him with his highly awkward style, despite himself being knocked down in the first round. The bout was ruled a ten-round split decision in favour of Vázquez, but the lone scorecard for Prescott was seen as controversial.

A second consecutive loss for Prescott occurred on December 5 during his second visit to England, as Kevin Mitchell won a wide unanimous decision with the now-vacant WBO Inter-Continental lightweight title on the line. Prescott returned to winning ways in 2010 and early 2011, scoring three wins with ease, but on September 10, 2011, he lost a close twelve-round unanimous decision to Paul McCloskey in England. This was followed by a dramatic loss on what would be Prescott's biggest stage to date, as part of the undercard to Manny Pacquiao vs. Juan Manuel Márquez III on November 12, 2011. In what was described as a thriller, Prescott went to war with fellow power-puncher Mike Alvarado, outworking him in the first half of the fight. However, in the tenth and final round, Prescott was knocked down and then hurt by a series of punches from Alvarado, which forced the referee to stop the fight.

In 2012, Prescott bounced back by winning two fights, but in 2013 would endure his fifth loss, this time to undefeated prospect Terence Crawford, who won a clear ten-round unanimous decision. Since then, he has lost 12 of his next 17 bouts.

== Professional boxing record ==
50 fights	31 wins	19 losses
By knockout	22	7
By decision	8	12
By disqualification	1	0

No.	Result	Record	Opponent	Type	Round, time	Date	Location	Notes
50	Loss	31–19	Sergey Vorobiev	KO	3 (10), 1:11	Nov 13, 2021	Sibir Boxing Academy, Novosibirsk, Russia	
49	Loss	31–18	Darwin Price	TKO	5 (10), 0:47	Oct 4, 2019	Arena Theatre, Houston, Texas, U.S.	
48	Loss	31–17	Livan Navarro	UD	8	May 10, 2019	Hard Rock Live, Hollywood, Florida, U.S.	
47	Loss	31–16	Bryant Perrella	UD	8	Feb 23, 2019	Minneapolis Armory, Minneapolis, Minnesota, U.S.	
46	Loss	31–15	Derrieck Cuevas	UD	10	Nov 30, 2018	Hard Rock Live, Hollywood, Florida, U.S.	
45	Loss	31–14	Subriel Matias	TKO	4 (10), 0:36	Aug 18, 2018	Coliseo Tomas Dones, Fajardo, Puerto Rico	
44	Loss	31–13	Ryan Martin	UD	8	May 5, 2018	StubHub Center, Carson, California, U.S.	
43	Win	31–12	Segundo Herrera	UD	8	Apr 6, 2018	Plaza Central, Puerto Colombia, Colombia	
42	Loss	30–12	Marcelino Lopez	KO	5 (8), 2:59	Jan 27, 2018	The Forum, Inglewood, California, U.S.	
41	Loss	30–11	Ray Robinson	TD	7 (10)	Jun 30, 2017	Tropicana Casino & Resort, Atlantic City, New Jersey, U.S.	Unanimous TD: Prescott unable to continue after an accidental head clash
40	Loss	30–10	Alexander Besputin	UD	8	Apr 22, 2017	StubHub Center, Carson, California, U.S.	
39	Loss	30–9	Dmitry Mikhaylenko	TKO	7 (12), 2:16	Nov 18, 2016	Palace of Sporting Games, Yekaterinburg, Russia	For vacant WBC Silver interim welterweight title
38	Win	30–8	Miguel Angel Suarez	TKO	6 (8), 1:02	Oct 22, 2016	Parque La Dicha, Palmar de Varela, Colombia	
37	Loss	29–8	Levan Ghvamichava	TKO	7 (10), 2:37	Jul 12, 2016	Robinson Rancheria Resort & Casino, Nice, California, U.S.	
36	Win	29–7	Claudinei Lacerda	UD	8	Nov 7, 2015	Miccosukee Resort & Gaming, Miami, Florida, U.S.	
35	Win	28–7	Kendry Galban	RTD	2 (6)	Jul 18, 2015	Coliseo Elias Chegwin, Barranquilla, Colombia	
34	Loss	27–7	Fredrick Lawson	SD	10	Mar 26, 2015	Park Race Track, Hialeah, Florida, U.S.	
33	Loss	27–6	Roberto Garcia	UD	10	Jul 25, 2014	UIC Pavilion, Chicago, Illinois, U.S.	
32	Win	27–5	Edinson Garcia	UD	10	Sep 28, 2013	Coliseo Municipal, Puerto Colombia, Colombia	
31	Loss	26–5	Terence Crawford	UD	10	Mar 30, 2013	Mandalay Bay Events Center, Paradise, Nevada, U.S.	
30	Win	26–4	Francisco Figueroa	UD	8	Aug 18, 2012	DoubleTree, Miami, Florida, U.S.	
29	Win	25–4	Joel Cassiani	KO	3 (8), 0:52	Jan 27, 2012	Coliseo Cubierto, Puerto Colombia, Colombia	
28	Loss	24–4	Mike Alvarado	TKO	10 (10), 1:53	Nov 12, 2011	MGM Grand Garden Arena, Paradise, Nevada, U.S.	For IBF Latino light welterweight title
27	Loss	24–3	Paul McCloskey	UD	12	Sep 10, 2011	Odyssey Arena, Belfast, Northern Ireland	
26	Win	24–2	Bayan Jargal	UD	10	Apr 22, 2011	Mohegan Sun Arena, Montville, Connecticut, U.S.	
25	Win	23–2	Harrison Cuello	UD	10	Aug 6, 2010	UIC Pavilion, Chicago, Illinois, U.S.	
24	Win	22–2	Jason Davis	TKO	3 (8), 1:11	May 15, 2010	The Theater at Madison Square Garden, New York City, New York, U.S.	
23	Loss	21–2	Kevin Mitchell	UD	12	Dec 5, 2009	Metro Radio Arena, Newcastle, England	For vacant WBO Inter-Continental lightweight title
22	Loss	21–1	Miguel Vázquez	SD	10	Jul 17, 2009	Planet Hollywood Resort & Casino, Paradise, Nevada, U.S.	
21	Win	21–0	Humberto Toledo	DQ	10 (10), 1:59	Feb 29, 2009	University Center Arena, Fort Lauderdale, Florida, U.S.	Toledo disqualified for biting
20	Win	20–0	Amir Khan	KO	1 (12), 0:54	Sep 6, 2008	MEN Arena, Manchester, England	Won WBO Inter-Continental lightweight title
19	Win	19–0	Richar Abril	SD	10	Jun 27, 2008	War Memorial Auditorium, Fort Lauderdale, Florida, U.S.	
18	Win	18–0	Anibal Polanco	TKO	2 (8)	Apr 25, 2008	Gimnasio Yuyin Luzcando, Betania, Panama	
17	Win	17–0	Orlando Solano	KO	1 (8)	Dec 22, 2007	Valledupar, Colombia	
16	Win	16–0	Franklin Arroyo	KO	2 (10)	Sep 29, 2007	Coliseo Julio Monsalvo Castilla, Valledupar, Colombia	Won vacant WBC FECARBOX lightweight title
15	Win	15–0	Jose Agustin Feria	TKO	9 (10)	Sep 1, 2007	Salon Jumbo del Country Club, Barranquilla, Colombia	
14	Win	14–0	Dunis Linan	UD	10	Jul 18, 2007	Coliseo Elias Chegwin, Barranquilla, Colombia	
13	Win	13–0	Miguel Angel Saurez	KO	3 (10)	May 11, 2007	Estadio Romelio Martínez, Barranquilla, Colombia	
12	Win	12–0	Erwin Romero	KO	2 (10)	Dec 15, 2006	Coliseo Municipal, Valledupar, Colombia	Won vacant WBC FECARBOX light welterweight title
11	Win	11–0	Over Orozco	KO	1 (10)	Nov 6, 2006	Coliseo Elias Chegwin, Barranquilla, Colombia	Retained Colombian light welterweight title
10	Win	10–0	Jorge Luis Noriega Medrano	TKO	5 (12)	Aug 11, 2006	Coliseo Municipal, Valledupar, Colombia	Retained Colombian light welterweight title
9	Win	9–0	Jesus Perez	KO	2 (10)	Jun 16, 2006	Las Vegas Recreaciones, Barranquilla, Colombia	Won vacant Colombian light welterweight title
8	Win	8–0	William Barrios	KO	3	Mar 31, 2006	Barranquilla, Colombia	
7	Win	7–0	Julio Cesar Perez	KO	2 (8)	Feb 23, 2006	Barranquilla, Colombia	
6	Win	6–0	Carlos Cuadrado	KO	3 (6)	Dec 16, 2005	Coliseo Municipal, Puerto Colombia, Colombia	
5	Win	5–0	Jaison Palomeque	KO	1 (4)	Nov 19, 2005	Puerto Colombia, Colombia	
4	Win	4–0	Wilson Torres	KO	2	Sep 30, 2005	Polideportivo San Felipe, Barranquilla, Colombia	
3	Win	3–0	Carlos Cuadrado	KO	2 (4)	Aug 6, 2005	Coliseo Elias Chegwin, Barranquilla, Colombia	
2	Win	2–0	Alberto Martinez	KO	2 (4)	Jul 16, 2005	Comunal del El Carmen, Barranquilla, Colombia	
1	Win	1–0	Oscar Pineda	TKO	1 (4)	Jul 1, 2005	Coliseo Elias Chegwin, Barranquilla, Colombia	

Sporting positions
Regional boxing titles
Vacant Title last held by Jose Herley Zuñiga Montaño	Colombian light welterweight champion June 16, 2006 – December 2006; Vacated	Vacant Title next held by Florencio Castellano
Vacant Title last held by Erick Garduno	WBC FECARBOX light welterweight champion December 15, 2006 – September 2007; Vacated	Vacant Title next held by Francisco Javier Castro
Vacant Title last held by Cesar Soriano	WBC FECARBOX lightweight champion September 29, 2007 – November 2007; Vacated	Vacant Title next held by Rafael Guzmán
Preceded by Amir Khan	WBO Inter-Continental lightweight champion September 6, 2008 – February 2009; Vacated	Vacant Title next held by Kevin Mitchell
