= Richar Abril =

Cuban boxer (born 1982)

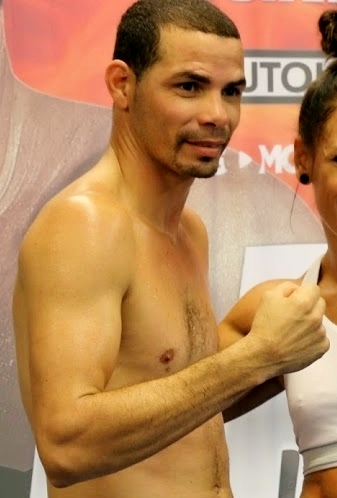
- Abril in Helsinki (August 2014)

Personal information
- Born: Richar Abril; 10 August 1982 (age 44) Cuba
- Height: 175 cm (5 ft 9 in)
- Weight: Lightweight

Boxing career
- Reach: 183 cm (72 in)
- Stance: Orthodox

Boxing record
- Total fights: 24
- Wins: 20
- Win by KO: 8
- Losses: 3
- Draws: 1

Richard "Richar" Abril (born 10 August 1982 in Cuba) is a Cuban professional boxer.

== Professional career ==
Most Cuban boxers have defected to go professional over the past few years. However, this wasn’t the case for Abril, a very good former amateur in his own right, having fought over 200 bouts. Unlike his countrymen who can’t return to the island, he is still able to return regularly to Cuba and spend time with friends and family. Several years ago, Abril won a lottery system, allowing him to freely come and go to and from Cuba. At the age of 23, Abril made his professional debut against Carlos Pena.

On October 22, 2011, Abril defeated Miguel Acosta by twelfth-round unanimous decision for the interim WBA Lightweight title.

After a proposed bout with Cuban superstar Yuriorkis Gamboa fell through, Brandon Rios agreed to face off with Abril on April 14, 2012 in Las Vegas for the vacant WBA lightweight title. Rios weighed in 137lbs - or two pounds overweight - thus the title was only at stake for Abril. In a controversial split-decision, Rios maintained his winning streak despite most fans and analysts believing Abril comprehensively won the fight. Due to Brandon's weight, Abril remained interim champion.

== Professional boxing record ==
24 fights	20 wins	3 losses
By knockout	8	0
By decision	12	3
Draws	1	

Key to abbreviations used for results
DQ	Disqualification	RTD	Corner retirement
KO	Knockout	SD	Split decision / split draw
MD	Majority decision / majority draw	TD	Technical decision / technical draw
NC	No contest	TKO	Technical knockout
PTS	Points decision	UD	Unanimous decision / unanimous draw

Boxing record
No.	Result	Record	Opponent	Type	Round(s), time	Date	Location	Notes
24	Win	20–3–1	Jerry Belmontes	UD	10	Jun 3, 2016	Resorts World New York City, Queens, New York, U.S.	
23	Win	19–3–1	Edis Tatli	MD	12	Sep 20, 2014	Hartwall Arena, Helsinki, Uusimaa, Finland	Retained WBA lightweight title
22	Win	18–3–1	Sharif Bogere	UD	12	Mar 2, 2013	Hard Rock Hotel and Casino, Las Vegas, Nevada, U.S.	Retained WBA lightweight title
21	Loss	17–3–1	Brandon Rios	SD	12	Apr 14, 2012	Mandalay Bay Convention Center, Las Vegas, Nevada, U.S.	For vacant WBA lightweight title
20	Win	17–2–1	Miguel Acosta	UD	12	Oct 22, 2011	Roberto Durán Arena, Panama City, Panama	Won WBA interim lightweight title
19	Win	16–2–1	Sergio Rivera	TKO	5 (10), 1:18	Aug 12, 2011	Seminole Hard Rock Hotel and Casino, Hollywood, Florida, U.S.	
18	Win	15–2–1	Julio Camano	UD	11	Jul 30, 2011	Gimnasio Nacional, San Jose, Costa Rica	Retained WBA Fedelatin lightweight title
17	Win	14–2–1	Miguel Angel Munguia	TKO	5 (10), 1:42	Dec 10, 2010	Kissimmee Civic Center, Kissimmee, Florida, U.S.	Won vacant WBA Fedelatin lightweight title
16	Win	13–2–1	Jose Reyes	UD	10	Oct 19, 2010	Seminole Hard Rock Hotel and Casino, Hollywood, Florida, U.S.	Won vacant WBC Latino lightweight title
15	Loss	12–2–1	Henry Lundy	SD	10	Jan 22, 2010	The Roxy, Boston, Massachusetts, U.S.	
14	Win	12–1–1	Juan Ramon Cruz	TKO	5 (8), 2:16	Dec 4, 2009	La Covacha, Miami, Florida, U.S.	
13	Win	11–1–1	Hensley Strachan	UD	6	Aug 21, 2009	Miami Beach Resort & Spa, Miami Beach, Florida, U.S.	
12	Loss	10–1–1	Breidis Prescott	SD	10	Jun 27, 2008	War Memorial Auditorium, Fort Lauderdale, Florida, U.S.	
11	Win	10–0–1	Marty Robbins	UD	8	May 30, 2008	Miami Beach Resort & Spa, Miami Beach, Florida, U.S.	
10	Win	9–0–1	Marcos Hernandez	TKO	1 (6), 0:46	Feb 29, 2008	National Guard Armory, Pikesville, Maryland, U.S.	
9	Win	8–0–1	Derrick Samuels	TKO	1 (6), 2:09	Mar 2, 2007	A La Carte Event Pavilion, Tampa, Florida, U.S.	
8	Win	7–0–1	Marcus Luck	TKO	2 (6), 0:55	Jan 20, 2007	Paris Las Vegas, Las Vegas, Nevada, U.S.	
7	Win	6–0–1	Ibn Shakir	KO	1 (6), 1:59	Oct 26, 2006	The Plex, North Charleston, South Carolina, U.S.	
6	Draw	5–0–1	Marcus Broadnax	PTS	6	Aug 18, 2008	Double Tree Westshore Hotel, Tampa, Florida, U.S.	
5	Win	5–0	Flud Lawson	TKO	1 (4), 1:40	Jul 28, 2006	Seminole Hard Rock Hotel and Casino, Hollywood, Florida, U.S.	
4	Win	4–0	Troy Harden	UD	4	Jun 30, 2006	Seminole Hard Rock Hotel and Casino Hollywood, Hollywood, Florida, U.S.	
3	Win	3–0	Angino Perez	UD	4	Apr 19, 2006	Palm Beach Convention Center, Palm Beach, Florida, U.S.	
2	Win	2–0	Andres Navarro	UD	4	Jan 27, 2006	Miccosukee Indian Gaming Resort, Miami, Florida, U.S.	
1	Win	1–0	Carlos Pena	UD	4	Dec 9, 2005	Kissimmee Civic Center, Kissimmee, Florida, U.S.	

Sporting positions
Interim boxing titles
Vacant Title last held by Robert Guerrero	WBA lightweight champion Interim title October 22, 2011 – February 28, 2013; Promoted	Vacant Title next held by Yuriorkis Gamboa
World boxing titles
Vacant Title last held by Juan Manuel Márquez as Super Champion	WBA lightweight champion February 28, 2013 – April 10, 2015; Status changed	Succeeded by Darleys Pérez; Interim Champion promoted
Honorary boxing titles
New title	WBA lightweight champion Champion in Recess; April 10 – August 12, 2015; Stripped	Vacant Title next held by Gervonta Davis
