= Jorge Rubio (boxing trainer) =

Cuban trainer

Jorge Enrique Rubio is a Cuban trainer in the sport of boxing. He is the former coach of the Olympic and national men's boxing team and defected from Cuba in 1997. He was inducted into the Florida Boxing Hall of Fame in 2018.

Rubio has previously trained 6 different world champion professional fighters in Miami, Florida, including Guillermo Rigondeaux, Teofimo Lopez, David Haye, Jermaine Taylor, Amir Khan, and Luke Campbell.

Jorge is currently training 3 fighters ranked in the top 10 in the world in including Abass Baraou, the #1 ranked Super Welterweight in the world by the WBA.
