= Mike Lee (boxer) =

American boxer (born 1987)

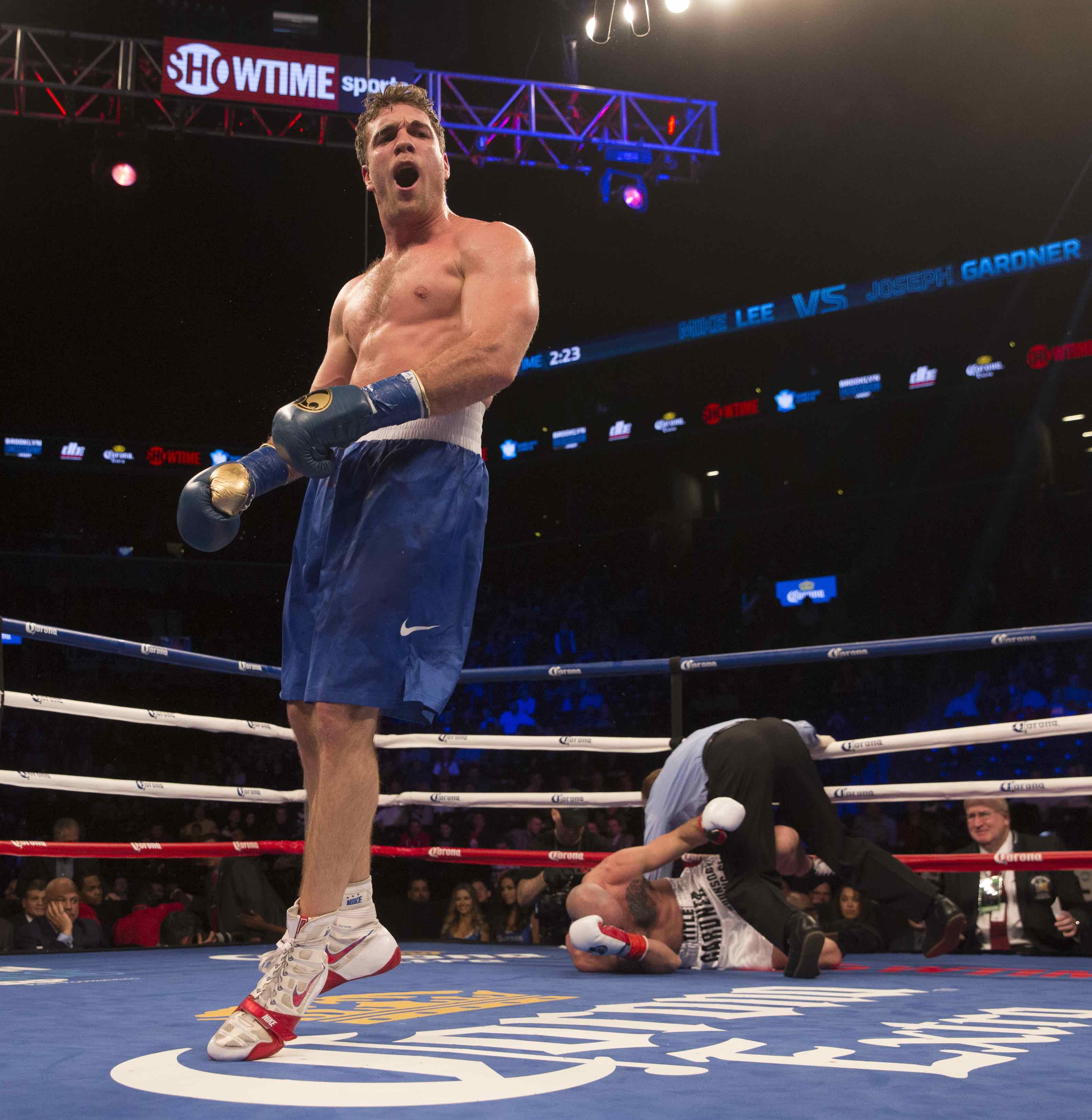
- Lee at Barclay's Center following KO of Joe Gardner on Jan. 16, 2016

Personal information
- Nationality: American
- Born: Michael Gene Lee; June 17, 1987 (age 39) Downers Grove, Illinois, U.S.
- Height: 6 ft 0 in (183 cm)
- Weight: Super middleweight; Light heavyweight

Boxing career
- Reach: 74 in (188 cm)
- Stance: Orthodox

Boxing record
- Total fights: 22
- Wins: 21
- Win by KO: 11
- Losses: 1

Michael Gene Lee (born June 17, 1987) is an American professional boxer. He turned pro in February 2010.

== Background ==
Lee is a 2005 graduate of Benet Academy in Lisle, Illinois where he was all conference linebacker in the Catholic League. Lee spent his freshman year at the University of Missouri and then transferred to the University of Notre Dame in 2006 and graduated with a 3.8 GPA in 2009 with a degree in finance from Notre Dame's Mendoza College of Business. He was offered jobs on Wall Street. Lee says, "I relax by watching CNBC, and I like to read the Wall Street Journal."

== Amateur career ==
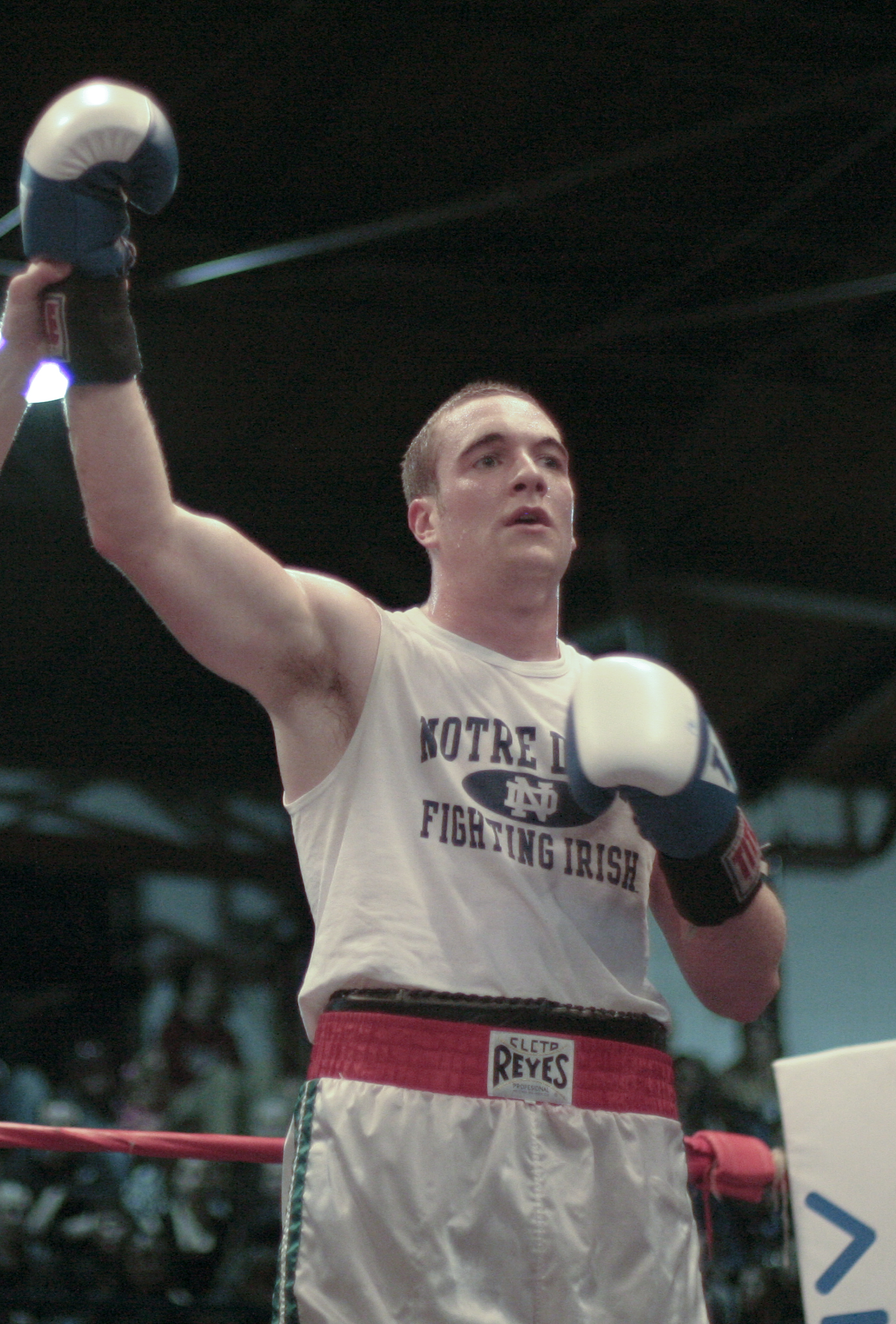
Lee at a Chicago Golden Gloves competition in 2009

Lee was introduced to the sport at age 16, when his cousin, who is an amateur boxer, took him to the Windy City Gym.

Notre Dame does not have an intercollegiate boxing team. However, Lee won the Bengal Bouts, an all campus intramural boxing tournament each of the three years that he attended the school.

During Lee's sophomore year, he won the 175-pound crown in a technical knockout that was called in the third round. In his junior year he was named junior captain and defended his title. Lee was named Boxer of the Year in his junior year, a feat that is typically reserved for a senior. Lee was named boxing team captain his senior year where he again won his third straight title in the Bengal Bouts.

Lee competed in the 2009 Chicago Golden Gloves competition in the sub-novice class, where Lee went undefeated in four matches, winning his class. In one memorable bout, Lee broke his opponents ribs thus immediately stopping the fight.

== Professional career ==
Lee is the current IBF-USBA Light Heavyweight champion and is ranked in the top 15 of the light heavyweight world rankings. He trains with Jamal Abdullah at the famed Wild Card West Boxing Gym in Santa Monica, California. Prior to being in Los Angeles full-time, Lee was in Houston working with legendary trainer Ronnie Shields.

Lee won his professional debut on May 29, 2010 at the UIC Pavilion in Chicago, in a four-round unanimous decision over Emmett Woods. All three judges scored the fight 40-36. On September 11, 2010, at the Palms Resort and Casino in Las Vegas, Lee defeated Alex Rivera at 2:59 of the second round. Lee received national attention through his endorsement contract with Subway that resulted in his appearance in a 2013 Super Bowl television commercial.

Following Lee's knockout of Tyler Seever in August 2012, Lee did not fight again until 2014. Lee spent two years in and out of hospitals battling what was later learned to be an autoimmune disease known as Ankylosing Spondylitis. His comeback from the hospital bed to back in the ring was documented in his well received article he wrote for The Player's Tribune titled: Invisible Pain.

Lee won his return to the ring - a sixth-round TKO against Peter Lewison

On September 30, 2016 Lee won a ten-round unanimous decision over Chris Traietti (21-4) at Chicago's UIC Forum to win the USBA-IBF title. The scores were 98-91, 99-90, 99-90. The victory made Lee the first fighter from Notre Dame’s amateur boxing program to win a title in the pro ranks."

On 15th September, 2017, Mike Lee made easy work of Aaron Quattrocchi, defeating him in just one round. Lee dropped his opponent twice in the opening round, and hurt him badly enough that the referee had to stop the fight.

In his next fight, Lee defeated Jose Hernandez via 10-round unanimous decision. It seemed like it would be an early finish after Lee shook Hernandez significantly in the opening round. However, Hernandez recovered and made for an entertaining bout, which Lee still managed to win comfortably in the end.

In his following fight, Lee fought his first world title fight, against IBF super middleweight champion Caleb Plant. Plant dominated the fight from the beginning. His dominance culminated with two knockdowns in the third round, which prompted the referee to stop the fight and award the champion with the TKO win.

== Professional boxing record ==
22 fights	21 wins	1 loss
By knockout	11	1
By decision	10	0

No.	Result	Record	Opponent	Type	Round, time	Date	Location	Notes
22	Loss	21–1	(United States) Caleb Plant	TKO	3 (12)	2019-07-20	(United States) MGM Grand Garden Arena, Nevada	For IBF super middleweight title
21	Win	21–0	(United States) Jose Hernandez	UD	10 (10)	2018-06-08	(United States) Allstate Arena, Rosemont	Won vacant NABO Light heavyweight title
20	Win	20–0	(United States) Aaron Quattrocchi	TKO	1 (10)	2017-09-15	(United States) The Dome at the Ballpark, Rosemont	
19	Win	19–0	(United States) Justin Thomas	MD	8 (8)	2017-02-16	(United States) The Hangar, Costa Mesa	
18	Win	18–0	(United States) Chris Traietti	UD	10 (10)	2016-09-30	(United States) Credit Union 1 Arena, Chicago	Won vacant USBA Light heavyweight title
17	Win	17–0	(United States) Mike Snider	UD	8 (8)	2016-06-03	(United States) Resorts World Casino, Queens	
16	Win	16–0	(United States) Joe Gardner	TKO	3 (8)	2016-01-16	(United States) Barclays Center, Brooklyn	
15	Win	15–0	(United States) Mike Sawyer	TKO	1 (8)	2015-12-12	(United States) Ramada Hotel & Convention Center, Omaha	
14	Win	14–0	(United States) Gary Tapusoa	TKO	2 (6)	2015-02-14	(United States) Resorts World Casino, Queens	Won vacant UBF All America Cruiserweight title
13	Win	13–0	(United States) Paul Gonsalves	MD	6 (6)	2014-07-25	(United States) Credit Union 1 Arena, Chicago	
12	Win	12–0	(Cayman Islands) Peter Lewison	TKO	6 (6)	2014-04-04	(United States) Liacouras Center, Philadelphia	
11	Win	11–0	(United States) Paul Harness	UD	4 (4)	2012-09-15	(United States) Thomas & Mack Center, Las Vegas	
10	Win	10–0	(United States) Tyler Seever	TKO	2 (6)	2012-08-04	(United States) Texas Station, Las Vegas	
9	Win	9–0	(Mexico) Eliseo Durazo	UD	6 (6)	2012-06-08	(United States) The Joint, Las Vegas	
8	Win	8–0	(United States) Allen Medina	TKO	4 (4)	2011-12-03	(United States) Madison Square Garden, New York	
7	Win	7–0	(United States) Jacob Stiers	UD	4 (4)	2011-09-16	(United States) Edmund P. Joyce Center, South Bend	
6	Win	6–0	(United States) Michael Birthmark	KO	3 (4)	9 Jul 2011	(United States) Dignity Health Sports Park, Carson	
5	Win	5–0	(United States) Gilbert Gastelum	MD	4 (4)	2011-05-06	(United States) Mandalay Bay Events Center, Las Vegas	
4	Win	4–0	(United States) Pablo Gomez	TKO	1 (4)	2011-02-26	(United States) Palms Casino Resort, Las Vegas	
3	Win	3–0	(United States) Keith Debow	KO	1 (4)	2010-11-13	(United States) AT&T Stadium, Arlington	
2	Win	2–0	(United States) Alex Rivera	TKO	2 (4)	2010-09-11	(United States) Palms Casino Resort, Las Vegas	
1	Win	1–0	(United States) Emmit Woods	UD	4 (4)	2010-05-29	(United States) Credit Union 1 Arena, Chicago	Professional debut

== Charity work ==
In the summer of 2008 Lee went to Bangladesh to see first hand how the money raised during the Bengal Bouts is used to aid people of all different ages including the construction of an entire school for children. Lee has established a foundation to help fund the Holy Cross Missions of Bangladesh where a portion of his purse money will be donated. In partnership with Champions for Children, he donated two ringside seats plus travel expenses for his November 2010 fight. The charity benefits Children’s Memorial Hospital.

On September 16, 2011, Lee headlined a professional boxing event at The University of Notre Dame inside the Purcell Pavilion in the Joyce Center.

The Mike Lee Foundation pledged all profits from this event, over $100,000 to the Ara Parseghian Medical Research Foundation, the Robinson Community Learning Center in South Bend and the Kelly Cares Foundation, headed by Coach Brian Kelly of the Fighting Irish Football Team.

== Later life ==
In 2018, Lee and his sister Angie, co-founded Soul CBD, a vendor of hemp oil products.
