= Best Upset ESPY Award =

Annual athletic award

The Best Upset ESPY Award was conferred once each in 2004 and 2005 annually from 2007 until 2017 and again in 2019 to the team in a regular season or playoff game or series contested professionally under the auspices of one of the four major sports leagues in the United States and Canada or collegiately under the auspices of the National Collegiate Athletic Association adjudged to have completed the best, most significant, or most impressive upset in a given calendar year.

In 2004, award selections were made by fans voting over the Internet or at relevant sporting events from among choices determined by a panel of sportswriters and broadcasters, ESPN personalities, and retired sportspersons, whilst since 2005 voting has been undertaken by fans exclusively over the Internet from among choices determined by the ESPN Select Nominating Committee. The ESPY Awards ceremony is conducted in July and awards conferred reflect performance and achievement over the twelve months previous to presentation.

There was no award presented in 2018, 2020, 2021, 2022, 2023 or 2024; however, an award was presented in 2019.

== List of winners ==
Year of award	Game or event	Date(s)	Competition or league	Sport	Winner	Loser	Score or result
2004	2004 NBA Finals	June 6, 2004 – June 15, 2004	National Basketball Association	Basketball	Detroit Pistons	Los Angeles Lakers	Four games to one in best-of-seven-game series
2005	2005 NCAA Division I men's basketball tournament first round	March 18, 2005	National Collegiate Athletic Association Division I	Basketball	Bucknell Bison	Kansas Jayhawks	64–63
2006	Not awarded						
2007	2007 NBA Playoffs, Western Conference first round	April 22, 2007 – May 3, 2007	National Basketball Association	Basketball	Golden State Warriors	Dallas Mavericks	Four games to two in best-of-seven-game series
2008	Super Bowl XLII	February 3, 2008	National Football League	American football	New York Giants	New England Patriots	17–14
2009	2009 FIFA Confederations Cup semifinal	June 24, 2009	Fédération internationale de football association (FIFA)	Soccer	United States men's national soccer team	Spain men's national soccer team	2–0
2010	2010 NCAA Division I men's basketball tournament second round	March 20, 2010	National Collegiate Athletic Association Division I	Basketball	Northern Iowa Panthers	Kansas Jayhawks	69–67
2011	2011 NCAA Division I men's basketball tournament Southwest Regional Final	March 27, 2011	National Collegiate Athletic Association Division I	Basketball	Virginia Commonwealth Rams	Kansas Jayhawks	71–61
2012	2012 Stanley Cup Playoffs	June 12, 2012	National Hockey League	Ice hockey	Los Angeles Kings	Vancouver Canucks; St. Louis Blues; Phoenix Coyotes	Defeated the top 3 seeds in the Western Conference to reach the 2012 Stanley Cup Final as a #8 seed (Los Angeles later defeated the New Jersey Devils in six games to win the Stanley Cup)
2013	2013 NCAA Division I men's basketball tournament South Regional 2nd Round	March 22, 2013	National Collegiate Athletic Association Division I	Basketball	Florida Gulf Coast Eagles	Georgetown Hoyas	78–68
2014	2014 NCAA Division I men's basketball tournament Midwest Regional 2nd Round	March 21, 2014	National College Athletic Association Division I	Basketball	Mercer Bears	Duke Blue Devils	78–71
2015	Regular season Southeastern Conference game	October 4, 2014	National Collegiate Athletic Association Division I	College football	Ole Miss Rebels	Alabama Crimson Tide	23–17
2016	UFC 193	November 14, 2015 (US time)	Ultimate Fighting Championship	Mixed martial arts	Holly Holm	Ronda Rousey	Holm knocked out the previously–undefeated Rousey in the second round of their bout to win the UFC women's bantamweight championship
2017	2017 NCAA Women's Basketball Final Four	March 31, 2017	NCAA Division I	College basketball	Mississippi State Bulldogs	Connecticut Huskies	Morgan William hit a pull-up jumper as time expired in overtime to give the Bulldogs a 66–64 win over UConn in the national semifinals, ending the Huskies' 111–game winning streak, the longest such streak by any men's or women's team in college basketball history.
2018	Not awarded						
2019	Anthony Joshua vs. Andy Ruiz Jr.	June 1, 2019	Various organizations	Boxing	Andy Ruiz Jr.	Anthony Joshua	Ruiz knocked out the previously-undefeated Joshua in the seventh round to win the WBA, IBF, WBO, and International Boxing Organization heavyweight titles.
2020	Not awarded due to the COVID-19 pandemic						
2021–present	Not awarded						

== See also ==
- Sports underdog
