= Andy Ruiz Jr. =

Mexican and American boxer (born 1989)

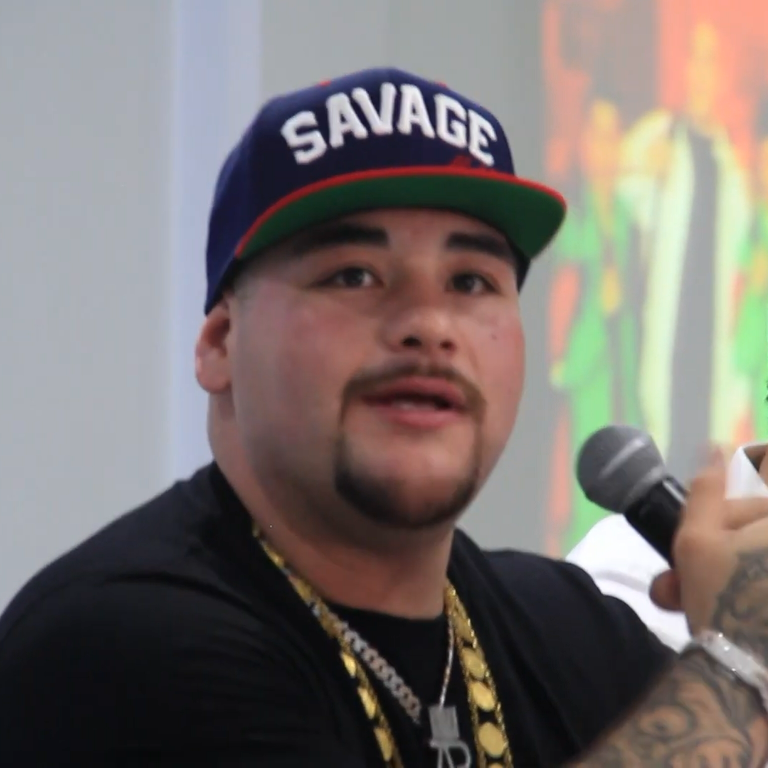
- Ruiz Jr. in 2019

Personal information
- Nickname: Destroyer
- Born: Andrés Ponce Ruiz Jr. September 11, 1989 (age 37) Imperial, California, U.S.
- Height: 6 ft 2 in (188 cm)
- Weight: Heavyweight

Boxing career
- Reach: 74 in (188 cm)
- Stance: Orthodox

Boxing record
- Total fights: 39
- Wins: 35
- Win by KO: 22
- Losses: 3
- Draws: 1

Andrés Ponce Ruiz Jr. (born September 11, 1989) is a Mexican-American professional boxer. He is a former unified world heavyweight champion, having held the World Boxing Association (WBA) (Super version), International Boxing Federation (IBF), and World Boxing Organization (WBO) titles in 2019 becoming the first heavyweight champion of Mexican descent. He also held the International Boxing Organization (IBO) title during that reign.

== Early life ==
Ruiz was born in Imperial, California; his parents had immigrated from Mexicali, Baja California, Mexico, to the U.S. His father is a former construction worker who started his own business flipping houses. Ruiz had a passion for baseball before his father got him into boxing; he has noted that his first fight was at age seven in San Diego. Ruiz later worked for his father in construction for a time before deciding to become a full-time boxer and starting his amateur career in Mexico. His grandfather owned a boxing gym in Mexicali that was used by featherweight champion Jorge Páez. Ruiz has explained that his nickname, "Destroyer," was acquired before he started boxing, because as a child, "I was always destroying stuff."

== Amateur career ==
During his amateur career, Ruiz boxed to a 105–5 record under Cuban trainer Fernando Ferrer. His 105 wins include two Mexican National Junior Olympics gold medals and a title at the Ringside World Championships. Ruiz also represented Mexico in two 2008 Beijing Olympic Games qualification tournaments, losing to eventual Olympians Robert Alfonso of Cuba and Óscar Rivas of Colombia in the first and second qualifiers. Ruiz's parents were born in Mexico, making Ruiz eligible to represent Mexico. (Note: Per Article 30 of the Constitution of Mexico, anyone born abroad to parents born in Mexican territory are considered Mexican-born citizens.)

=== World Championships results ===
2007

- Lost to Michael Hunter (United States) RSCO–3

=== Pre-Olympic Tournament results ===
2007

- Lost to Zhang Zhilei (China) 28–9

=== Mexican National Championships results ===
2008

- Defeated Jose Luis Castro (Mexico) RSC–3
- Defeated Yusett Savala (Mexico) 12–0
- Defeated Juan Isidro Hiracheta (Mexico) AB–2

=== USA vs Mexico results ===
2008

- Lost to Mike Colin Wilson (United States) 16–9

=== American Olympic Qualifications results ===
2008

- Defeated Gerardo Bisbal (Puerto Rico) 24–7
- Lost to Robert Alfonso (Cuba) 7–3

=== American Olympic Qualifications results ===
2008

- Defeated German Sandi (Costa Rica) RSC–1
- Lost to Óscar Rivas (Colombia) 16–4

== Professional career ==
Ruiz had Freddie Roach in his corner and at the Wild Card Gym and sparred with former UFC heavyweight champion, Andrei Arlovski. Ruiz mostly fought journeymen opposition earlier in his career but did knock out two amateur stars in 2006 US amateur champion Jonte Willis and 2008 Golden Gloves champion Tor Hamer.

=== Early career ===
A 19-year-old Ruiz made his professional debut on March 28, 2009, at the Plaza de Toros in Tijuana, Baja California, Mexico, in a four-round bout against Miguel Ramírez. Ruiz won the fight via a first-round knockout (KO). Ruiz fought again after three months at the same venue, this time knocking Ross Brantley down three times in round one, winning the bout via technical knockout (TKO). Ruiz took an eight-month gap before he returned to the ring in February 2010, winning a four-round unanimous decision against Juan Luis Lopez Alcaraz. A month later, Ruiz made his American debut at the Gaylord Hotel in Texas, knocking out Luke Vaughn in round one. Ruiz had his next three fights of 2010 also in the U.S., defeating Miles Kelly via KO, Raymond Lopez via unanimous decision and Francisco Diaz via KO. On February 5, 2011, Ruiz knocked out Kelsey Arnold in the third-round and in the same month defeated Alvaro Morales via unanimous decision 59–55, 59–55, and 60–54. In April 2011, Ruiz defeated Angel Herrera via six-round unanimous decision. In July, Ruiz fought at the Texas Station Casino, Las Vegas, defeating Villi Bloomfield via fourth-round TKO. He returned to the Casino on December 7 and defeated Elijah McCall (11–1–1, 10 KOs), son of former world champion Oliver McCall, by a TKO one second before round three ended. Referee Kenny Bayless waves off the fight after McCall stopped defending himself. Ruiz's hand speed was showcased in this fight.

On March 23, 2012, Ruiz fought his first eight-round fight, outpointing Homero Fonseca. All three judges scored the fight 80–72. In July, Ruiz fought Jonte Willis (8–3–1, 3 KOs) at the Home Depot Center, Carson, California. Willis entered with a record of 1–3–1 in his previous five fights, including a split decision loss three months prior to Denis Bakhtov (33–7). Ruiz floored Willis in round five from a short right hand before referee Wayne Hedgpeth stopped the bout in round eight, after a combination of unanswered punches. This was on the undercard of Donaire vs. Mathebula.

=== Rise up the ranks ===
On July 27, 2013, Ruiz traveled to Macau with Top Rank to fight at the Cotai Arena against undefeated 30 year old American Joe Hanks (21–0, 14 KOs) in a scheduled ten round fight. Ruiz dropped Hanks twice in round four with fast right hands, forcing the stoppage. Ruiz claimed the vacant WBO Inter-Continental heavyweight title with this win. On November 24, Ruiz fought again the Cotai Arena, this time on the Pacquiao-Rios undercard, successfully defending his WBO Inter-Continental heavyweight title and claiming the vacant WBC-NABF heavyweight title defeating Tor Hamer (21–2, 14 KOs). The fight was stopped after the third-round when Hamer indicated he did not wish to continue. Over the three rounds, Ruiz landed 74 of 213 punches thrown (35%) and Hamer landed 49 of his 131 thrown (37%) before he quit on his stool. This was the second time Hamer had retired on his stool following his previous loss to Vyacheslav Glazkov in December 2012. His promoter Lou DiBella announced Hamer had been released from his contract.

On December 20, 2014, Ruiz fought former WBO heavyweight champion, 38 year old Siarhei Liakhovich (26–6, 16 KOs) at the Celebrity Theater in Phoenix, Arizona. Ruiz was taken to the ten round distance for the first time in his career by Liakhovich, who trained hard for this fight and tried to win. The scorecards read 98–92, 96–94, and 99–91, all in favour of Ruiz who retained his titles. This was the last time Liakhovich fought. Ruiz revealed he fractured his right hand during the second round. In June 2015, Ruiz began training with well-known trainer Abel Sanchez, whose most notable boxer was Gennady Golovkin.

After a 9-month gap, Ruiz returned to the ring in September 2015 at the Tachi Palace Hotel & Casino in Lemoore, California, defeating Joell Godfrey via unanimous decision over eight rounds, all three judges scored it 80–72. Godfrey was a late replacement for Devin Vargas, who was unable to obtain a license from the California Athletic Commission. A month later, Ruiz fought veteran Raphael Zumbano Love (37–11–1, 30 KOs). Ruiz won on points after eight rounds.

On May 14, 2016, Ruiz fought 45 year old, former world title challenger Ray Austin (29–6–4, 18 KOs) at the Sportsman's Lodge in California. Austin weighed 18 pounds more than Ruiz at the weigh-in. This was the first time in 14 professional fights that Ruiz was outweighed by his opponent. This was Ruiz's fourth successful defence of his WBC-NABF heavyweight title as Austin was down in round one, he injured his right hand and failed to come out of his corner for round five. After this bout, Ruiz increased his record to 27 wins in as many fights.

Ruiz fought on July 16 against 42 year old Josh Gormley (22–4, 21 KOs) at the Masonic Temple in Michigan. Promoted by Salita Promotions. Ruiz won the fight via third-round TKO.

Ruiz next fought on September 10, 2016, returning to the Tachi Palace Hotel & Casino in California to headline "Solo Boxeo Tecate" (UniMas) against 40 year old Franklin Lawrence (21–2–2, 16 KOs) for the WBC-NABF heavyweight title. Lawrence had won his last nine fights inside the distance dating back to 2009, with his last loss being against veteran Oliver McCall. His only other loss came in his fifth professional fight against future WBC world champion Bermane Stiverne, which was stopped after Lawrence injured his arm in round one. Ruiz made a successful fifth defence of his WBC-NABF title after ten one-sided rounds. The judges scored the fight 100–90, 99–91, and 99–91. The win also set up a future WBO eliminator with bout with Hughie Fury.

It was announced after the Lawrence fight that Ruiz would fight Hughie Fury in the UK on October 29 at the Manchester Arena, on the undercard of the cancelled rematch between Tyson Fury and Wladimir Klitschko. The winner would be the mandatory challenger for the WBO heavyweight title. Two weeks later, it was reported that Ruiz had withdrawn because he did not want the fight.

=== WBO heavyweight title challenge ===
==== Ruiz vs. Parker ====
Ruiz was ordered to fight Joseph Parker in New Zealand for the WBO heavyweight title with the fight set to take place on December 10, 2016. This fight came about by Ruiz being one of the top two ranked contenders willing to fight for the vacant title. The title became vacant when former champion Tyson Fury vacated the title.

Discussions and negotiations began after Fury was expected to be stripped of his WBO belt over inactivity and testing positive for cocaine. With his sudden announcement that he would relinquish his heavyweight world title belts due to his various issues, it was unclear exactly how the WBO and WBA would go about filling the vacancies. But before Fury vacated, Duco Events promoter Dean Lonergan announced in early October he had been negotiating an alternative WBO title fight against Ruiz, suggesting he had a chance of reaching a deal with Bob Arum. He pointed out that the WBO rules stated the two best-classified contenders will challenge for the title. Arum told ESPN.com that he was in talks with the WBO about making it for the vacant title.

Ruiz failed to become the first heavyweight of Mexican ancestry to win a world title when Parker won the bout by a majority decision. The judges scored the fight 114–114, 115–113, and 115–113. Ruiz started off well being the aggressor but slowed down during mid rounds, only to take control again during the championship rounds. Both men showed respect for each other throughout the contest. After the fight, Ruiz said, "I think I got the win or at least a draw, I think I set the pace with my jab." Ruiz said he wanted a rematch. CompuBox stats showed that Parker landed 119 of 560 punches thrown (21%) and Ruiz landed 107 of his 416 thrown (26%). On a delayed HBO broadcast, the fight peaked at 585,000 viewers, with an average of 521,000 viewers.

=== Winning streak in 2018–2019 ===
==== Ruiz vs. Vargas ====
On December 19, 2017, Angel "Memo" Heredia, a well known strength and conditioning trainer, confirmed that he would be working alongside Ruiz. Ruiz was next to make a ring return on February 3, 2018, on the undercard of Gilberto Ramirez vs. Habib Ahmed WBO super middleweight title fight at the American Bank Center in Corpus Christi, Texas. Ruiz did not appear on the card and instead his return was pushed back to take place at the StubHub Center in Carson, California on the undercard of Óscar Valdez vs. Scott Quigg on March 10. In his absence from the ring, he explained, "I just wanted to take a break. I already have 30 fights. I wanted to be with the family, I started investing my money. I started building houses. But every boxers needs that little break and now I've got to come back harder." American boxer Devin Vargas (20–4, 8 KOs) was confirmed as his opponent in a scheduled eight round bout. Ruiz knocked Vargas out in round one. He landed a big right hand to the head of Vargas, dropping him. Referee Thomas Taylor called off the fight. The official time of the stoppage was at 1:38 of round one. Ruiz showed good power and speed during the short fight. For the bout, Ruiz trained with Manny Robles. Ruiz received a $500,000 purse.

==== Ruiz vs. Johnson ====
His next fight was scheduled to take place on July 7, 2018, at the Save Mart Center in Fresno, California, against former world title challenger Kevin Johnson (32–9–1, 16 KOs). The main goal for this bout was for Ruiz to get in some much needed rounds, having only completed less than a round in over a year. Johnson, who had previously only been stopped twice in his nine losses, was known for his toughness, having taken the likes of Kubrat Pulev, Derek Chisora, Tyson Fury and Vitali Klitschko the twelve round distance. Ruiz dominated Johnson over ten rounds, winning via unanimous decision with scores of 99–91, 97–93, and 97–93. Johnson did not do much apart from throw a strong jab from time to time. It was Ruiz who was busy and remained in control for majority of the bout. Ruiz admitted it was good to go the distance and called out some of the better heavyweights, namely Jarrell Miller.

==== Ruiz vs. Dimitrenko ====
On January 11, 2019, it was reported that Ruiz had signed a deal with powerful advisor Al Haymon, and would now be part of the Premier Boxing Champions (PBC) stable, with his fights being aired on Showtime and FOX. It was said that Ruiz had bought out the remainder of his Top Rank promotional contract. On March 7, Ruiz's PBC debut was announced to take place on the Danny García vs. Adrián Granados undercard on April 20 at the Dignity Health Sports Park in Carson, California against 36 year old German boxer Alexander Dimitrenko (41–4, 26 KOs) in a ten-round bout. The fight was televised on FOX and FOX Deportes. For the fight, Ruiz weighed 262 pounds and Dimitrenko came it at 259 pounds. Ruiz was guaranteed a $200,000 purse, whilst Dimitrenko was guaranteed $75,000. Using his quick hands and combinations, Ruiz was able to overcome Dimitrenko via TKO in round five. The bout nearly came to an end in round four when Ruiz nearly knocked Dimitrenko down, however Dimitrenko managed to make it to the end of the round. Ruiz landed 68 punches overall, compared to Dimitrenko, who landed 21 punches. For his next fight, Ruiz wanted to fight Adam Kownacki.

=== Unified heavyweight champion ===
==== Ruiz vs. Joshua ====
Prior to the Dimitrenko fight, Ruiz put his name forward to replace Jarrell Miller and challenge Anthony Joshua (22–0, 21 KOs) for the unified WBA (Super), IBF, WBO, and IBO heavyweight titles on June 1, 2019, after Miller was denied a license by the New York Athletic Commission because he failed three different tests for PEDs. On April 22, Ruiz confirmed his team had a meeting scheduled with promoter Eddie Hearn, officially putting himself in the running. Ruiz became a frontrunner after it was reported Luis Ortiz's team had rejected two offers of career-high purses to fight Joshua. Terms were agreed within a week. On May 1, with one month to go before fight night, Joshua vs. Ruiz was confirmed and announced to take place at Madison Square Garden in New York City, broadcast exclusively on DAZN in the United States and on PPV Sky Sports Box Office in the United Kingdom.

On June 1, Ruiz defeated Joshua by technical knockout in the seventh-round, capturing the unified WBA (Super), IBF, WBO, and IBO titles. In the third round, Joshua knocked Ruiz to the canvas, which was the first time Ruiz had suffered a knockdown in his career. Ruiz rose to his feet and continued to attack. Ruiz landed a left hook to Joshua's temple which visibly staggered him, after which Ruiz knocked him down. Just before the end of round three, Ruiz again knocked down Joshua after forcing him into a corner and unleashing a series of power punches. In round seven, Ruiz knocked Joshua down once again. Joshua managed to get back on his feet again before being floored for a fourth and final time, resulting in the referee waving off the fight. The referee subsequently awarded Ruiz a seventh-round technical knockout victory, making him the first Mexican-American and second Hispanic heavyweight champion in boxing history after John Ruiz (who has no relation to Andy Ruiz). At the time of stoppage, Ruiz was leading the fight 57–56 on two scorecards and Joshua was leading 57–56 on the other. It is considered to be one of the biggest upsets in the history of boxing.

==== Ruiz vs. Joshua II ====
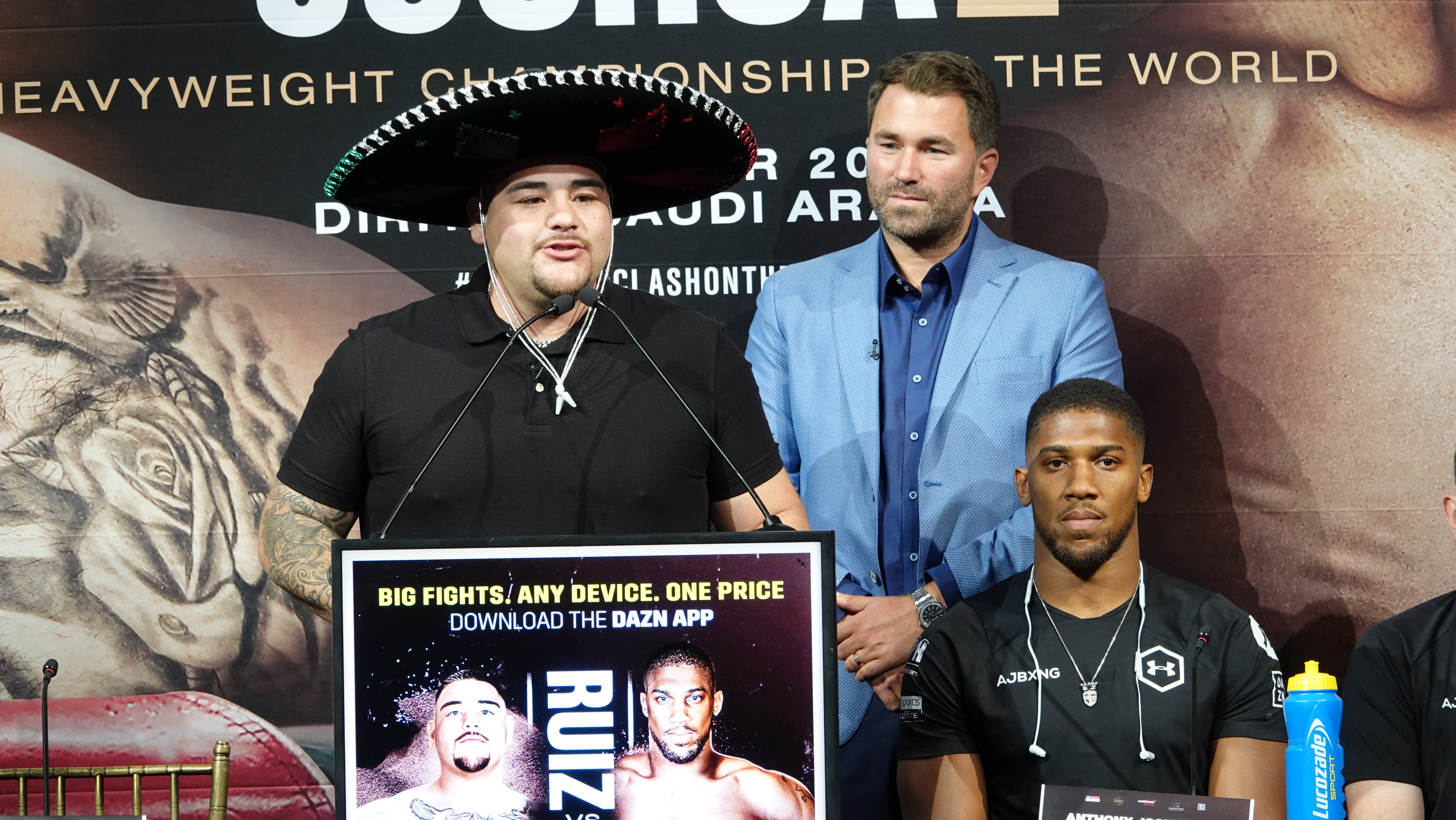
Andy Ruiz Jr. speaks at the press conference announcing his rematch with Anthony Joshua.

In September 2019, it was announced that Ruiz would defend his titles against Joshua in a rematch. The fight broke the UK PPV record, totaling 1.575 million buys in the UK. The fight was a low-key affair in which Joshua mainly stayed behind his jab. Joshua boxed a disciplined fight, keeping Ruiz at a distance with his jab and using lateral movement to avoid trading punches up close as he had in their first encounter. He started off well, landing a sharp right hand in the first round that cut Ruiz to the side of his left eye. Joshua continued to box economically and land the more meaningful punches. Ruiz had some success when he tagged Joshua to the head and body at the end of the fourth round, but Joshua remained firmly in control of the action. Ruiz lost the fight via unanimous decision, with the three judges scoring the bout 118–110, 118–110, and 119–109. In his post-fight interview, Ruiz admitted that he hadn't trained diligently for the fight, stating, "I should have taken this fight more seriously. Three months of partying and celebrating affected me." In addition, he showed respect to Joshua, saying "Anthony Joshua did a hell of a job."

=== Post-title career ===
After the loss to Joshua, Ruiz left his trainer, Manny Robles. He hired Eddy Reynoso as his trainer in May 2020.

==== Ruiz vs. Arreola ====
In his first fight since losing his world titles, Ruiz faced former WBC title challenger Chris Arreola on Fox PPV on May 1, 2021. This was his first fight with his new trainer Eddy Reynoso in his corner. Ruiz recovered from a second round knockdown to win a unanimous decision with scores of 118–109, 118–109, 117–110.

==== Ruiz vs. Ortiz ====
Ruiz left Eddy Reynoso and started training with Alfredo Osuna.

Sixteen months after defeating Chris Arreola, Ruiz returned to the ring on September 4, 2022, in Los Angeles to face former WBA interim heavyweight champion Luis Ortiz in an eliminator for the WBC title.

Despite being outboxed by Ortiz for portions of the fight, Ruiz dropped his opponent three times, twice in the second round and once in the seventh. The knockdowns proved to be decisive, with the judges scoring the bout 114–111, 114–111 and 113–112 in Ruiz's favor. Former WBC champion Deontay Wilder had been in attendance, and both Ruiz and Wilder welcomed the prospect of facing each other.

==== Ruiz vs. Miller ====
Ruiz had surgery to repair the rotator cuff in his right shoulder. He had been inactive for 23 months before his next fight. On April 24, 2024, a press conference was held at the Gotham Hall in Los Angeles to announce Riyadh Season's debut card in the United States, which was to take place on August 3 at the BMO Stadium in Los Angeles. The headline was Terence Crawford vs. Israil Madrimov in a super welterweight title fight. Ruiz was announced for the card, in a crossroads fight against American heavyweight Jarrell Miller in a 12-round heavyweight co-feature bout. There was no trash talk from Miller towards Ruiz. Instead, Miller said he would go for a pint after the fight was over. For Miller, the fight was not personal, however he stated that he would make Ruiz pay, for replacing him and taking his purse against Joshua. Miller weighed 305.6 pounds, however according to California State Athletic Commission, was 312 pounds on fight night. Ruiz weighed 274.4 pounds, and gained a pound before the fight took place.

The fight ended in a majority draw: one judge scored the bout 116–112 to Miller, but was overruled by the other two judges who scored it a 114–114 draw. Miller started slowly, but after three rounds, Ruiz looked tired and did well to still go the distance. Miller was the more aggressive fighter and in control of the pace of the fight. He was pushing the action against Ruiz. Ruiz was limited in his offence, and Miller exploited this by piling on sustained pressure. During the last ten seconds of every round, Miller threw flurries. This was most likely a tactic by Miller to take rounds in his favour, as he was not able to be active for the full three minutes of each round.

Ruiz's right hand appeared to be fractured during the fight with notable visual deformity to the contour of his metacarpal region shown in the post-fight interview. In his post-match interview, Miller asserted his opinion that he won the fight: "I know I did enough to win, I threw more punches. I had him backing up the entire fight. It's called effective aggression. I kept the pressure on and I hit him with the more effective punches. I had the fight in the bag." Fans on social media were also critical of scoring, feeling Ruiz's career was saved by the judges. Speaking further on the result, Miller said, "That's boxing; sometimes you get robbed. I just want the fans to keep supporting me; I've been an underdog my whole life." Miller said he was against having judges from the West Coast for the bout. According to CompuBox, Miller landed 183 of his 514 punches thrown (35.6%) and Ruiz landed 113 of his 355 punches thrown (31.8%). Ruiz was more active during the first four rounds out-landing Miller 47–40. Miller landed double digits in every round from the third. Ruiz posted a picture of his injured right hand on social media, saying it affected his performance. It was believed to have been injured in the fifth round.

=== Signing with Matchroom in 2026 ===
On July 8, 2026, it was reported that Ruiz had signed a multi-fight deal with Matchroom Boxing. On the announcement, he said on social media, "Once you have everything and lost it all, you're going to do whatever it takes to get that back. And that's why I'm ready to go to war with any other heavyweight out there. I had to be broken to be reborn." His goal was to regain the heavyweight world titles. He said, "I'm here to make history again."

==== Ruiz vs. Knyba ====
Prior to the promotional announcement, Mike Coppinger reported that Ruiz may return on September 4 against Polish heavyweight Damian Knyba (17–1, 11 KOs) on a Matchroom card in Newark. Knyba's last fight was a controversial third‑round stoppage loss to Agit Kabayel in January, which made him a reasonable comeback opponent for Ruiz, given his inactivity. On July 14, the fight was announced to headline the third edition of TNT–DAZN's “The Fight”, to take place at the Prudential Center. Ruiz also reunited with trainer Manny Robles. In a statement, he said, “We’re going to become a two‑time champion next year. Let’s get it.” Ruiz appeared on the Mr. Verzace Podcast, saying, “I still need to do things that I said I was gonna do. I want that Ring belt and WBC belt. I want to become a two-time heavyweight champion so I’m gonna die trying.” He described the return as 'personal', adding, “I owe it to me. I owe it to my fans in Mexico, I owe it to my family, and especially to God to continue that mission.” Ruiz weighed in at 254.3 pounds, his lightest recorded weight since 2018, when he weighed 252 pounds against Kevin Johnson. The fight had been described as a potential final opportunity for Ruiz to re-establish himself as a contender in the heavyweight division.

Ruiz was dropped heavily in the seventh round on his way to a unanimous decision defeat over 12 rounds. Ruiz was unable to overcome Knyba's significant height and reach advantages, losing by scores of 117–110, 114–113, and 114–113. He struggled to close the distance and complained afterward that Knyba "was holding every time I came in." Knyba controlled the fight with his jab and movement, scoring a heavy knockdown in the seventh round and finishing strongly. Ruiz's best moment in the fight came in the eighth round when he landed big overhand rights, backing Knyba up. From the ninth round, Knyba regained control, returning to the jab and limiting Ruiz's offense. Knyba threw 720 jabs throughout the fight.

Despite the defeat, Ruiz insisted he would continue fighting, saying he "just need[s] to stay active" and requested a rematch. Knyba described the victory as "so amazing" and credited his success to using his "physical attributes, my reach, my movement." The win strengthened Knyba's position in the heavyweight division.

== Personal life ==
Ruiz resides in his hometown of Imperial, California; he graduated from Imperial High School in 2007. Ruiz considers himself both American and Mexican and identifies with both nationalities: "America's one of the greatest countries in the world. For me, I'm an American and I'm a Mexican. I live here. And it hurts me the way a lot of people talk about Mexicans when I know we're all about hard work and dedication." He is fluent in both English and Spanish. In April 2024, a California court granted Ruiz's former partner, Julia Lemus, a three-year domestic violence restraining order following allegations of abuse. Ruiz denied the allegations.

== Professional boxing record ==
| 39 fights | 35 wins | 3 losses |
|---|---|---|
| By knockout | 22 | 0 |
| By decision | 13 | 3 |
| Draws | 1 | |

| No. | Result | Record | Opponent | Type | Round, time | Date | Location | Notes |
|---|---|---|---|---|---|---|---|---|
| 39 | Loss | 35–3–1 | Damian Knyba | UD | 12 | Sep 4, 2026 | Prudential Center, Newark, New Jersey, U.S. | |
| 38 | Draw | 35–2–1 | Jarrell Miller | MD | 12 | Aug 3, 2024 | BMO Stadium, Los Angeles, California, U.S. | |
| 37 | Win | 35–2 | Luis Ortiz | UD | 12 | Sep 4, 2022 | Crypto.com Arena, Los Angeles, California, U.S. | |
| 36 | Win | 34–2 | Chris Arreola | UD | 12 | May 1, 2021 | Dignity Health Sports Park, Carson, California, U.S. | |
| 35 | Loss | 33–2 | Anthony Joshua | UD | 12 | Dec 7, 2019 | Diriyah Arena, Diriyah, Saudi Arabia | Lost WBA (Super), IBF, WBO, and IBO heavyweight titles |
| 34 | Win | 33–1 | Anthony Joshua | TKO | 7 (12), 1:33 | Jun 1, 2019 | Madison Square Garden, New York City, New York, U.S. | Won WBA (Super), IBF, WBO, and IBO heavyweight titles |
| 33 | Win | 32–1 | Alexander Dimitrenko | RTD | 5 (10), 3:00 | Apr 20, 2019 | Dignity Health Sports Park, Carson, California, US | |
| 32 | Win | 31–1 | Kevin Johnson | UD | 10 | Jul 7, 2018 | Save Mart Center, Fresno, California, U.S. | |
| 31 | Win | 30–1 | Devin Vargas | KO | 1 (8), 1:38 | Mar 10, 2018 | StubHub Center, Carson, California, U.S. | |
| 30 | Loss | 29–1 | Joseph Parker | MD | 12 | Dec 10, 2016 | Vector Arena, Auckland, New Zealand | For vacant WBO heavyweight title |
| 29 | Win | 29–0 | Franklin Lawrence | UD | 10 | Sep 10, 2016 | Tachi Palace Hotel & Casino, Lemoore, California, U.S. | Retained WBC-NABF heavyweight title |
| 28 | Win | 28–0 | Josh Gormley | TKO | 3 (10), 1:42 | Jul 16, 2016 | Masonic Temple, Detroit, Michigan, U.S. | |
| 27 | Win | 27–0 | Ray Austin | RTD | 4 (8), 3:00 | May 14, 2016 | Sportsmen's Lodge, Studio City, California, U.S. | Retained WBC-NABF heavyweight title |
| 26 | Win | 26–0 | Raphael Zumbano Love | UD | 8 | Oct 24, 2015 | CenturyLink Center, Omaha, Nebraska, U.S. | |
| 25 | Win | 25–0 | Joell Godfrey | UD | 8 | Sep 26, 2015 | Tachi Palace Hotel & Casino, Lemoore, California, U.S. | Retained WBC-NABF heavyweight title |
| 24 | Win | 24–0 | Siarhei Liakhovich | UD | 10 | Dec 20, 2014 | Celebrity Theatre, Phoenix, Arizona, U.S. | Retained WBO Inter-Continental and WBC-NABF heavyweight titles |
| 23 | Win | 23–0 | Kenny Lemos | TKO | 1 (8), 2:18 | Oct 25, 2014 | Selland Arena, Fresno, California, U.S. | |
| 22 | Win | 22–0 | Manuel Quezada | TKO | 2 (10), 2:00 | May 17, 2014 | Selland Arena, Fresno, California, U.S. | Retained WBO Inter-Continental and WBC-NABF heavyweight titles |
| 21 | Win | 21–0 | Tor Hamer | RTD | 3 (10), 3:00 | Nov 23, 2013 | Cotai Arena, Macau, SAR | Retained WBO Inter-Continental heavyweight title; Won vacant WBC-NABF heavyweight title |
| 20 | Win | 20–0 | Joe Hanks | TKO | 4 (10), 1:41 | Jul 27, 2013 | Cotai Arena, Macau, SAR | Won vacant WBO Inter-Continental heavyweight title |
| 19 | Win | 19–0 | Carl Davis | TKO | 1 (8), 0:35 | Jun 8, 2013 | The Joint, Paradise, Nevada, U.S. | |
| 18 | Win | 18–0 | Matthew Greer | KO | 1 (8), 2:53 | Mar 16, 2013 | Home Depot Center, Carson, California, U.S. | |
| 17 | Win | 17–0 | Elijah McCall | TKO | 3 (8), 2:59 | Dec 7, 2012 | Texas Station, North Las Vegas, Nevada, U.S. | |
| 16 | Win | 16–0 | Maurenzo Smith | KO | 1 (8), 2:11 | Sep 13, 2012 | The Joint, Paradise, Nevada, U.S. | |
| 15 | Win | 15–0 | Jonte Willis | TKO | 8 (8), 0:54 | Jul 7, 2012 | Home Depot Center, Carson, California, U.S. | |
| 14 | Win | 14–0 | Homero Fonseca | UD | 8 | Mar 23, 2012 | Casino Del Sol, Tucson, Arizona, U.S. | |
| 13 | Win | 13–0 | Theron Johnson | UD | 6 | Dec 17, 2011 | WinStar World Casino, Thackerville, Oklahoma, U.S. | |
| 12 | Win | 12–0 | Ken Frank | TKO | 2 (6), 1:53 | Sep 17, 2011 | BlueWater Resort & Casino, Parker, Arizona, U.S. | |
| 11 | Win | 11–0 | Villi Bloomfield | TKO | 4 (4), 2:04 | Jul 15, 2011 | Texas Station, North Las Vegas, Nevada, U.S. | |
| 10 | Win | 10–0 | Angel Herrera | UD | 6 | Apr 23, 2011 | WinStar World Casino, Thackerville, Oklahoma, U.S. | |
| 9 | Win | 9–0 | Alvaro Morales | UD | 6 | Feb 26, 2011 | Pearl Concert Theater, Paradise, Nevada, U.S. | |
| 8 | Win | 8–0 | Kelsey Arnold | TKO | 3 (6), 2:19 | Feb 5, 2011 | Maywood Center, Maywood, California, U.S. | |
| 7 | Win | 7–0 | Francisco Diaz | KO | 2 (4), 1:08 | Dec 4, 2010 | Honda Center, Anaheim, California, U.S. | |
| 6 | Win | 6–0 | Raymond Lopez | UD | 4 | Nov 20, 2010 | WinStar World Casino, Thackerville, Oklahoma, U.S. | |
| 5 | Win | 5–0 | Miles Kelly | TKO | 1 (4), 1:06 | Oct 16, 2010 | Silverton Las Vegas, Enterprise, Nevada, U.S. | |
| 4 | Win | 4–0 | Luke Vaughn | KO | 1 (4), 1:55 | Mar 12, 2010 | Gaylord Texan Resort Hotel & Convention Center, Grapevine, Texas, U.S. | |
| 3 | Win | 3–0 | Juan Luis Lopez Alcaraz | UD | 4 | Feb 12, 2010 | Gimnasio Municipal, Mexicali, Mexico | |
| 2 | Win | 2–0 | Ross Brantley | TKO | 1 (6), 1:37 | Jun 26, 2009 | Plaza de toros Calafia, Mexicali, Mexico | |
| 1 | Win | 1–0 | Miguel Ramirez | KO | 1 (4), 0:34 | Mar 28, 2009 | Bullring by the Sea, Tijuana, Mexico | |

== Titles in boxing ==
=== Major world titles ===
- WBA (Super) heavyweight champion (200+ lbs)
- IBF heavyweight champion (200+ lbs)
- WBO heavyweight champion (200+ lbs)

=== Minor world titles ===
- IBO heavyweight champion (200+ lbs)

=== Regional/International titles ===
- WBC-NABF heavyweight champion (200+ lbs)
- WBO Inter-Continental heavyweight champion (200+ lbs)

== Pay-per-view bouts ==
=== Professional boxing ===
United Kingdom
| Date | Fight | Network | Buys |
|---|---|---|---|
| June 1, 2019 | Joshua vs. Ruiz | Sky Box Office | 562,000 |
| December 7, 2019 | Ruiz vs. Joshua II | Sky Box Office | 1,600,000 |
| May 1, 2021 | Ruiz vs. Arreola | Fox Broadcasting Company | 150,000 |
| September 4, 2022 | Ruiz vs. Ortiz | FITE TV | 65,000 |
| Total sales | | | 2,227,000 |

== See also ==
- List of world heavyweight boxing champions
- List of Mexican boxing world champions

== Footnotes ==
Sporting positions
Regional boxing titles
| Vacant Title last held by Tyson Fury | WBO Inter-Continental heavyweight champion July 27, 2013 – May 2015; Vacated | Vacant Title next held by Andrey Fedosov |
| Vacant Title last held by Éric Molina | WBC–NABF heavyweight champion Nov 23, 2013 – December 2016; Vacated | Vacant Title next held by Óscar Rivas |
Minor world boxing titles
| Preceded by Anthony Joshua | IBO heavyweight champion June 1, 2019 – December 7, 2019 | Next: Anthony Joshua |
Major world boxing titles
| Preceded by Anthony Joshua | WBA heavyweight champion Super title June 1, 2019 – December 7, 2019 | Next: Anthony Joshua |
| Preceded by Anthony Joshua | IBF heavyweight champion June 1, 2019 – December 7, 2019 | Next: Anthony Joshua |
| Preceded by Anthony Joshua | WBO heavyweight champion June 1, 2019 – December 7, 2019 | Next: Anthony Joshua |
Awards
| Previous: Cristofer Rosales; TKO9 Daigo Higa | The Ring Upset of the Year; TKO7 Anthony Joshua; 2019 | Incumbent |
| Previous: Mississippi State defeats Connecticut; No award in 2018 | Best Upset ESPY Award; TKO7 Anthony Joshua; 2019 | Incumbent |
