= Urbano Antillón =

American boxer (born 1982)

Personal information
- Born: September 5, 1982 (age 43) Maywood, California, U.S.
- Height: 5 ft 7 1/2 in (171 cm)
- Weight: Super featherweight Lightweight

Boxing career
- Reach: 69 in (175 cm)
- Stance: Orthodox

Boxing record
- Total fights: 32
- Wins: 29
- Win by KO: 21
- Losses: 3

Urbano Antillón (born September 5, 1982) is an American former professional boxer. He challenged twice for a lightweight world title, and held the WBO–NABO and NABF super featherweight titles.

== Early life ==
Antillón was born to Urbano and Amelia Antillon and is the youngest of four children. He was born and raised in Maywood, California.

== Amateur career ==
Antillón became active in karate and boxing at a young age, choosing boxing as his career choice. To this day, Antillón still trains at the Maywood Boxing Club, in Maywood, California.

After 40 amateur fights, Urbano decided to turned pro at the age of eighteen, under the tutelage of trainer Rudy Hernandez. In 2005, Antillón was signed by Top Rank, the boxing promotion company founded by Bob Arum.

== Professional career ==
Defeating the likes of Daniel Attah, Bobby Pacquiao in the first round, Fernando Trejo, Roque Cassiani, José Luis Soto Karass and Ivan Valle. Antillón has won two regional titles, WBO NABO and NABF in the Super Featherweight division.

=== WBA Lightweight title ===
In July 2009, Antillón the pride of Maywood California, fought Miguel Acosta for the interim WBA Lightweight Championship. Antillon was upset in the bout, being knocked out in the 9th round with an uppercut.

=== WBC Lightweight title ===
On December 4, 2010, Urbano lost to WBC Lightweight Champion Humberto Soto at the Honda Center in Anaheim, California.

=== WBA Lightweight title ===
In his next bout Antillón lost to undefeated WBA Lightweight Champion, Brandon Ríos.

== Professional record ==
29 Wins (21 knockouts), 3 Losses, 0 Draw
Res.	Record	Opponent	Type	Rd., Time	Date	Venue and Location	Notes
Win	29-3-0	(Mexico) Leonardo Resendiz	TKO	2 (8)	March 15, 2013	Explanada Municipal, Tepeji del Río de Ocampo, Mexico	
Loss	28-3-0	(United States) Brandon Ríos	TKO	3 (12)	Jul 9, 2011	(United States) Home Depot Center, Carson, California	For WBA Lightweight title
Loss	28-2-0	(Mexico) Humberto Soto	UD	12 (12)	December 4, 2010	(United States) Honda Center, Anaheim, California	For WBC Lightweight title
Win	28-1-0	(Nicaragua) Rene Gonzalez	UD	10 (10)	May 8, 2010	La Feria de San Marcos, Aguascalientes, Mexico	
Win	27-1-0	(Mexico) Luis Antonio Arceo	TKO	3 (10)	February 20, 2010	Discoteca El Alebrije, Acapulco, Mexico	
Loss	26-1-0	(Venezuela) Miguel Acosta	TKO	9 (12)	July 25, 2009	Palenque del Recinto Ferial, Acapulco, Mexico	For interim WBA Lightweight title
Win	26-0-0	(United States) Tyrone Harris	TKO	5 (10)	May 1, 2009	(United States) Hard Rock Hotel and Casino, Las Vegas, Nevada, U.S.	
Win	25-0-0	(Puerto Rico) Juan Ramon Cruz	KO	4 (10)	December 12, 2008	(United States) Alameda Swap Meet, Los Angeles, California, U.S.	
Win	24-0-0	(Nigeria) Daniel Attah	KO	4 (12)	September 5, 2008	(United States) Isleta Casino & Resort, Albuquerque, New Mexico, U.S.	
Win	23-0-0	(Colombia) Jose Leonardo Cruz	TKO	6 (8)	June 6, 2008	(United States) Sovereign Performing Arts Center, Reading, Pennsylvania, U.S.	
Win	22-0-0	(Philippines) Bobby Pacquiao	KO	1 (10)	March 13, 2008	(United States) Hard Rock Hotel and Casino, Las Vegas, Nevada, U.S.	
Win	21-0-0	(Mexico) Adrian Valdez	TKO	1 (10)	December 21, 2007	(United States) Dickerson's Event Center, Las Cruces, New Mexico, U.S.	
Win	20-0-0	(Colombia) Wilson Alcorro	KO	2 (10)	October 2, 2007	(United States) Hard Rock Hotel and Casino, Las Vegas, Nevada, U.S.	
Win	19-0-0	(Thailand) Thongchai Por Pratompong	TKO	2 (8)	July 7, 2007	Korakuen Hall, Tokyo, Japan	
Win	18-0-0	(Mexico) Roberto Mares	TKO	3 (8)	July 14, 2006	(United States) Charro Ranch, San Antonio, Texas, U.S.	
Win	17-0-0	(Mexico) Fernando Trejo	SD	10 (10)	December 23, 2005	(United States) Sycuan Resort & Casino, El Cajon, California, U.S.	
Win	16-0-0	(Colombia) Roque Cassiani	UD	8 (8)	September 17, 2005	(United States) America West Arena Phoenix, Arizona, U.S.	
Win	15-0-0	(Mexico) José Luis Soto Karass	TKO	5 (8)	May 6, 2005	(United States) Fort McDowell Casino, Fountain Hills, Arizona, U.S.	
Win	14-0-0	(Mexico) Juan Carlos Martinez	TKO	6 (8)	October 23, 2004	(United States) Activity Center, Maywood, California, U.S.	
Win	13-0-0	(Mexico) Ramon Ortiz	KO	1 (6)	July 16, 2004	(United States) Memorial Civic Center, Canton, Ohio, U.S.	
Win	12-0-0	(United States) Adan Hernandez	UD	10 (10)	December 11, 2003	(United States) Olympic Auditorium, Los Angeles, California, U.S.	
Win	11-0-0	(Mexico) Martin Bermudez	TKO	6 (8)	September 13, 2003	(United States) MGM Grand, Las Vegas, Nevada, U.S.	
Win	10-0-0	(Mexico) Ivan Valle	UD	10 (10)	June 19, 2003	(United States) Olympic Auditorium, Los Angeles, California, U.S.	
Win	9-0-0	(Mexico) Leobardo Roman	KO	2 (4)	March 23, 2003	(United States) Pechanga Resort & Casino, Temecula, California, U.S.	
Win	8-0-0	(Mexico) Orlando Jesus Soto	TKO	5 (6)	December 13, 2002	(United States) Desert Diamond Casino, Tucson, Arizona, U.S.	
Win	7-0-0	(Mexico) Oscar Villa	TKO	3 (8)	November 7, 2002	(United States) Hilton Hotel, Burbank, California, U.S.	
Win	6-0-0	(El Salvador) Carlos Arnoldo Cisneros	TKO	6 (6)	May 17, 2002	(United States) Blaisdell Center Arena, Honolulu, Hawaii, U.S.	
Win	5-0-0	(Mexico) Jose Luis Montes	UD	6 (6)	February 1, 2002	(United States) Palace Indian Gaming Center, Lemoore, California, U.S.	
Win	4-0-0	(United States) Sergio Joel De La Torre	UD	6 (6)	October 4, 2001	(United States) Scottish Rite Auditorium, San Diego, California, U.S.	
Win	3-0-0	(Brazil) Altamir Souza Pereira	TKO	2 (4)	September 14, 2001	(United States) Quiet Cannon, Montebello, California, U.S.	
Win	2-0-0	(Japan) Shinya Kiuchi	KO	1 (6)	February 17, 2001	Kokugikan, Tokyo, Japan	
Win	1-0-0	(United States) Michaelangelo Lynks	UD	4 (4)	November 30, 2000	(United States) Hollywood Park Casino, Inglewood, California, U.S.	
