= Brandon Ríos =

American boxer (born 1986)

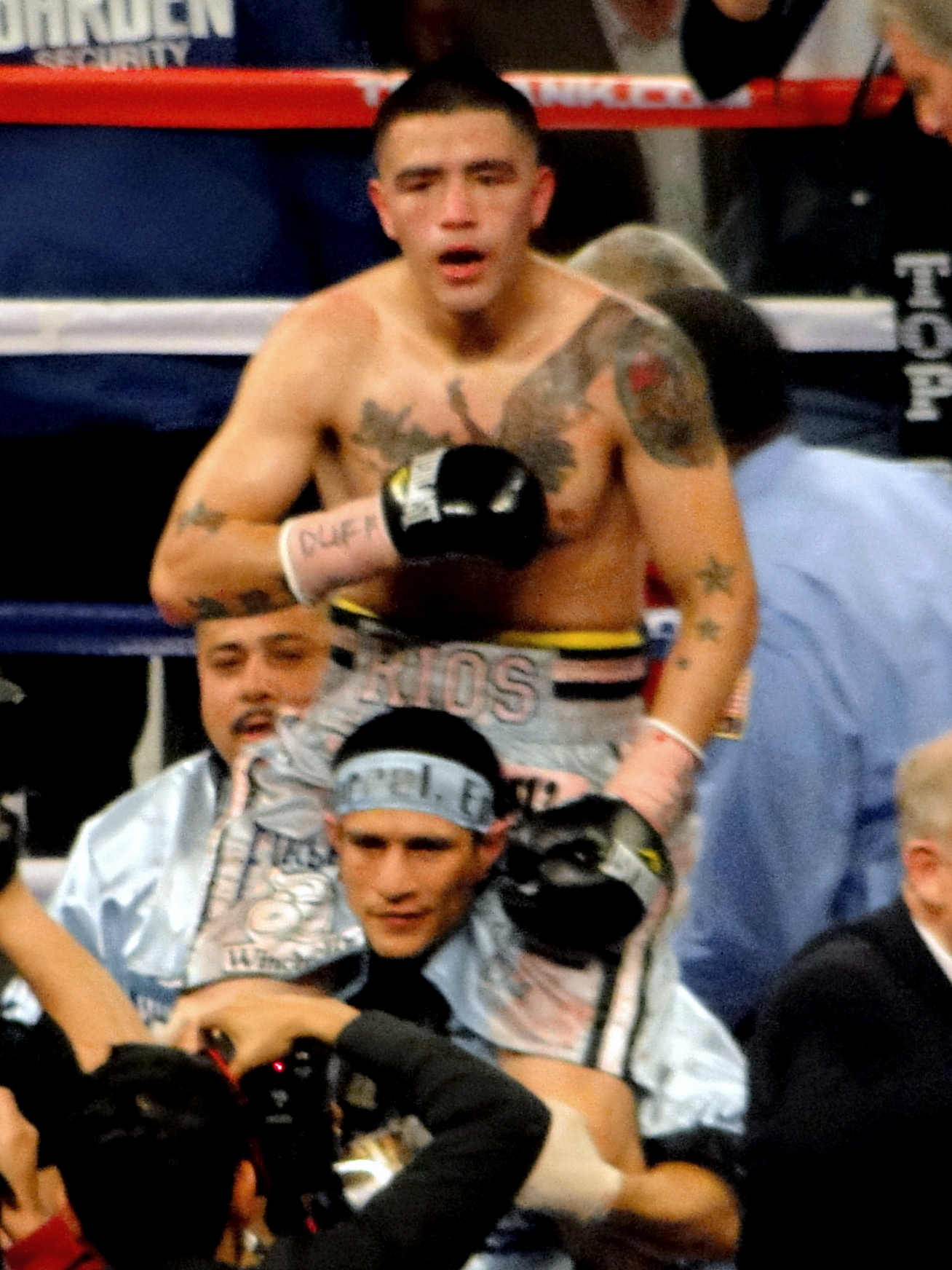
- Ríos in 2011

Personal information
- Nickname: Bam Bam
- Born: Brandon Lee Ríos; April 29, 1986 (age 40) Lubbock, Texas, U.S.
- Height: 5 ft 8 in (173 cm)
- Weight: Lightweight; Light welterweight; Welterweight

Boxing career
- Reach: 68 in (173 cm)
- Stance: Orthodox

Boxing record
- Total fights: 41
- Wins: 35
- Win by KO: 26
- Losses: 5
- Draws: 1

Brandon Lee Ríos (born April 29, 1986) is an American former professional boxer. He held the WBA Regular lightweight title in 2011 and has challenged once for the WBO welterweight title in 2015. Nicknamed "Bam Bam", Ríos was known for his aggressive pressure fighting style, formidable punching power, and exceptionally durable chin during his prime.

== Amateur career ==
Ríos compiled a stellar amateur record of 230–35. In 2004 he became the U.S. National Amateur Featherweight champion, and was also a United States Olympic alternate at 125 lbs. "When I met Roberto in the Olympic trials in Mississippi, that's when Roberto came and worked my corner, which it was a bad mistake," Rios said as García laughed. "I should have never done that because my dad was my amateur coach through my whole career. You get used to one person and then you come with another guy and he doesn't really know you? To me, it kind of messed me up. But then again, I'm glad we met because we exchanged information and he brought me down here."

== Professional career ==
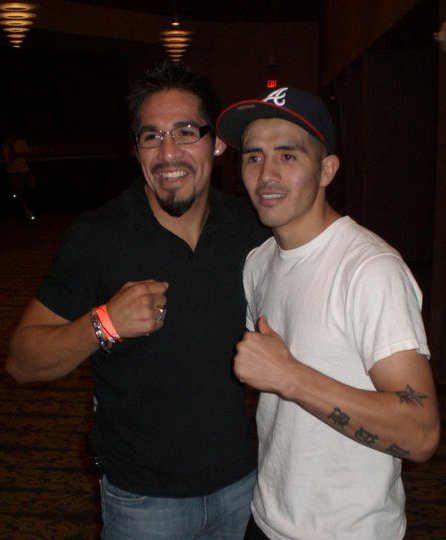
Ríos (right) with Antonio Margarito, 2011

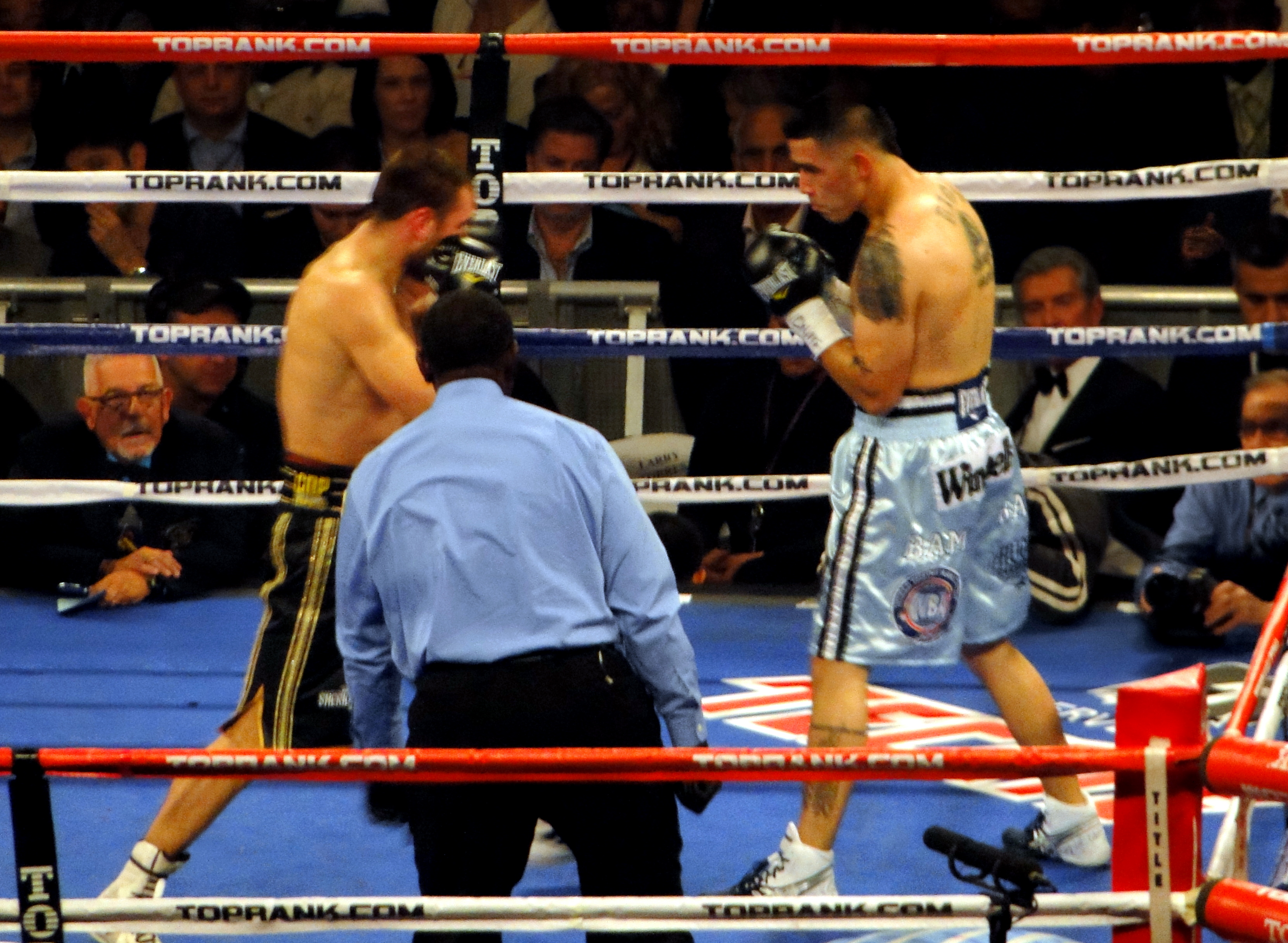
Ríos (right) versus John Murray, 2011

He is signed to Bob Arum's company Top Rank. On October 17, 2009, Ríos got a TKO victory in the 7th round over Manuel Pérez.

He next fought in a WBA title eliminator against the undefeated contender Anthony Peterson, on a HBO Boxing After Dark card. Rios dropped Peterson to the canvas with a left hand at the end of the fifth round. In the sixth round, a desperate Peterson landed several low blows on Ríos, losing two points in the process. In the seventh round, Peterson landed low blows once again, prompting the referee to stop the bout and award Ríos a disqualification victory. Brandon was leading on all three scorecards before the stoppage. His next fight was the first HBO PPV fight on the undercard of Margarito vs. Pacquiao. Bob Arum stated that if Rios beat Omri Lowther at Cowboys Stadium, Brandon would get a shot to fight against WBC Lightweight Champion Humberto Soto next. Rios won by TKO in the fifth round.

=== WBA Lightweight Championship ===
On February 26, 2011, Rios defeated WBA World Lightweight Champion, Venezuelan Miguel Acosta via a 10th-round TKO, becoming the new WBA regular Lightweight champion.

==== Ríos vs. Antillon ====
Brandon's first title defense saw him face Urbano Antillón, in a bout that was previously expected to take place once before in May 2010. Rios won the fight by TKO in the third round.

=== Light Welterweight ===
==== Ríos vs. Alvarado I & II ====
Rios faced Mike Alvarado at the Home Depot Center in Carson, California on October 13, 2012. Rios was behind on the scorecards until the 6th round where in he hurt Alvarado with a crushing right. Rios was able to stop Alvarado in the 7th as referee Pat Russell stopped the bout at 1:57 of the round. The fight was voted the 2012 Fight of the Year by the Sports Illustrated.

A much anticipated rematch was held on March 30, 2013, at the Mandalay Bay in Las Vegas, Nevada. Like the first fight, both came in with a lot of fireworks as they continued to go toe to toe, until Alvarado changed strategy and became a lot more evasive and hard to hit with fancy footwork. Alvarado defeated Rios by unanimous decision with scores of 115–113, 115–113 and 114–113. Top Rank promoter Bob Arum dismissed another rematch and suggested to let the two boxers face other fighters first.

=== Welterweight ===
==== Rios vs. Pacquiao ====
Rios and Pacquiao battled for the vacant WBO International Welterweight title on November 23, 2013, at Cotai Arena in Macau. Rios was guaranteed a purse of $3 million for this fight which is the highest of his boxing career. On August 5, Ríos and Pacquiao hit the road on a U.S. tour promoting the fight. Pacquiao won the 12-round match and the WBO International Welterweight title very easily.

==== Ríos vs. Alvarado III ====
Following a disqualification win over Argentine Diego Chaves, a third fight was announced against old rival, Mike Alvarado. On January 24, 2015, in Alvarado's home town of Denver, Colorado, Rios punished Alvarado for 3 rounds before the referee stopped the fight prior to the start of the fourth.

==== Ríos vs. Bradley ====
On November 7, 2015, Rios battled Timothy Bradley for the WBO Welterweight title at the Thomas & Mack Center in Las Vegas, Nevada. He was unsuccessful in doing so, losing every round of the fight in the process before referee Tony Weeks called an end to the bout at 2:48 of the ninth round, marking the first time Ríos had ever been stopped in his professional career.

During the emotional post-fight interview, Rios announced his retirement, stating that although he loved the sport, his body was no longer acting the same and that both weight fluctuations and layoffs were affecting his performances. He has since gone on record to say that he would also like to spend more time with his family and close friends now as well.

==== Comeback ====
Rios made a comeback to the ring against Aaron Herrera on June 11, 2017, with new trainer Ricky Funez, after splitting with longtime trainer Robert García. Rios won by KO in the 7th round.

==== Rios vs Garcia ====
In his next fight, Rios fought former world titlist Danny Garcia who was ranked #1 by the WBA and #2 by the WBC at welterweight. Garcia won the fight via TKO in the ninth round.

==== Rios vs Alvarez ====
In his next bout, Rios fought Ramon Alvarez the brother of pound-for-pound great Canelo Alvarez. In an action-packed fight, Rios startet off sloppy, but managed to turn the fight around and punish Alvarez and finish him in the ninth round.

==== Rios vs Soto ====
Rios' next fight came against Humerto Soto. In another action-packed fight, Rios pressed forward and was looking to exchange. Soto, however, was the craftier and more efficient of the two throughout the fight, which earned him a wide unanimous decision win on all three scorecards, 119-111, 118-112 and 118-112.

== Personal life ==
Brandon married Victoria López in August 2010 and has three children and two from a previous relationship. Ríos gave the names Laila, Mia and Ava to his three daughters, after boxers Mia St. John and Laila Ali. His two sons are named Brandon Jr. and Marcus Antonio respectively, the latter of which is after Mexican World Champion Marco Antonio Barrera. He resides in Oxnard, California.

=== Victor Ortiz feud ===
As amateur boxers both Ríos and Victor Ortíz fought out of the same boxing gym in Garden City, Kansas, at the Garden City Boxing Club where they were both trained by Manuel Ríos. For a short time Brandon's father trained Ortíz when they both still lived in Kansas. Ortíz would later move to Oxnard to train under Robert García, Ríos also left Kansas after being invited by García to train in Oxnard. In 2009 after an incident involving Brandon, Victor and Victor's younger brother Temo, their relationship became strained. A fight between Ríos and Ortíz has been proposed at a catch weight of 138 lbs or even at 140 lbs, with Ríos stating on numerous occasions that he's gotten the better of Ortíz many times during sparring when they were growing up.

=== Freddie Roach incident ===
In the much anticipated lead up to the Margarito vs. Pacquiao fight at Cowboys Stadium, Ríos made headlines along with Antonio Margarito and Robert García when Elie Seckbach interviewed the three of them and showed the group mocking Manny Pacquiao's trainer Freddie Roach, who has Parkinson's disease. Elie Seckbach made a video response defending Rios and Margarito, and stated that the media misunderstood their gestures. Seckbach stated that they were actually making fun of Freddie Roach's comments where he (Roach) stated that Margarito was going to get knocked out. García explained that Ríos was "joking around", and that Brandon was also unaware that Roach has Parkinson's disease. In the video, Ríos himself explains that their gestures were a response to Roach's trash talking.

== Professional boxing record ==
41 fights	35 wins	5 losses
By knockout	26	2
By decision	7	3
By disqualification	2	0
Draws	1	

No.	Result	Record	Opponent	Type	Round, time	Date	Location	Notes
41	Loss	35–5–1	Humberto Soto	UD	12	Feb 23, 2019	Auditorio Fausto Gutierrez Moreno, Tijuana, Mexico	
40	Win	35–4–1	Ramón Álvarez	TKO	9 (10), 0:38	Nov 17, 2018	Kansas Star Arena, Mulvane, Kansas, U.S.	
39	Loss	34–4–1	Danny García	TKO	9 (12), 2:25	Feb 17, 2018	Mandalay Bay Events Center, Paradise, Nevada, U.S.	
38	Win	34–3–1	Aaron Herrera	KO	7 (10), 2:11	Jun 11, 2017	Pioneer Event Center, Lancaster, California, U.S.	
37	Loss	33–3–1	Timothy Bradley	TKO	9 (12), 2:49	Nov 7, 2015	Thomas & Mack Center, Paradise, Nevada, U.S.	For WBO welterweight title
36	Win	33–2–1	Mike Alvarado	RTD	3 (12), 3:00	Jan 24, 2015	1stBank Center, Broomfield, Colorado, U.S.	Won vacant WBO International welterweight title
35	Win	32–2–1	Diego Chaves	DQ	9 (10), 1:26	Aug 2, 2014	Cosmopolitan of Las Vegas, Paradise, Nevada, U.S.	Chaves disqualified for repeated fouls
34	Loss	31–2–1	Manny Pacquiao	UD	12	Nov 24, 2013	Cotai Arena, Macau, SAR	For vacant WBO International welterweight title
33	Loss	31–1–1	Mike Alvarado	UD	12	Mar 30, 2013	Mandalay Bay Events Center, Paradise, Nevada, U.S.	For WBO interim junior welterweight title
32	Win	31–0–1	Mike Alvarado	TKO	7 (10), 1:57	Oct 13, 2012	Home Depot Center, Carson, California, U.S.	Won vacant WBO Latino junior welterweight title
31	Win	30–0–1	Richar Abril	SD	12	Apr 14, 2012	Mandalay Bay Events Center, Paradise, Nevada, U.S.	
30	Win	29–0–1	John Murray	TKO	11 (12), 2:06	Dec 3, 2011	Madison Square Garden, New York City, New York, U.S.	
29	Win	28–0–1	Urbano Antillón	KO	3 (12), 2:39	Jul 9, 2011	Home Depot Center, Carson, California, U.S.	Retained WBA (Regular) lightweight title
28	Win	27–0–1	Miguel Acosta	TKO	10 (12), 1:14	Feb 26, 2011	Pearl Concert Theater, Paradise, Nevada, U.S.	Won WBA (Regular) lightweight title
27	Win	26–0–1	Omri Lowther	TKO	5 (10), 2:04	Nov 13, 2010	Cowboys Stadium, Arlington, Texas, U.S.	
26	Win	25–0–1	Anthony Peterson	DQ	7 (12), 3:00	Sep 11, 2010	Pearl Concert Theater, Paradise, Nevada, U.S.	Peterson disqualified for repeated low blows
25	Win	24–0–1	Jorge Teron	TKO	3 (10), 1:13	Feb 6, 2010	Convention Center, McAllen, Texas, U.S.	Won vacant WBC–NABF lightweight title
24	Win	23–0–1	Lorenzo Estrada	TKO	1 (10), 2:06	Nov 6, 2009	Convention Center, Garden City, Kansas, U.S.	
23	Win	22–0–1	Manuel Pérez	TKO	7 (10), 1:16	Oct 17, 2009	Whataburger Field, Corpus Christi, Texas, U.S.	
22	Win	21–0–1	Daniel Valenzuela	KO	2 (8)	Sep 12, 2009	Palenque de la Feria, Tepic, Mexico	
21	Win	20–0–1	Oscar Meza	TKO	5 (10), 0:24	May 16, 2009	Star of the Desert Arena, Primm, Nevada, U.S.	
20	Win	19–0–1	Carlos Guevara	KO	5 (10), 1:11	Dec 19, 2008	National Western Complex Arena, Denver, Colorado, U.S.	
19	Draw	18–0–1	Manuel Pérez	MD	10	Oct 3, 2008	National Western Complex Arena, Denver, Colorado, U.S.	
18	Win	18–0	Sandro Marcos	TKO	2 (8), 2:13	Jul 25, 2008	The Joint, Paradise, Nevada, U.S.	
17	Win	17–0	Ricardo Dominguez	SD	10	May 17, 2008	Plaza de Toros Monumental, Aguascalientes City, Mexico	
16	Win	16–0	Alvin Brown	TKO	2 (8), 1:10	Mar 14, 2008	Cicero Stadium, Cicero, Illinois, U.S.	
15	Win	15–0	Carlos Madrid	SD	6	May 25, 2007	Isleta Resort & Casino, Albuquerque, New Mexico, U.S.	
14	Win	14–0	Humberto Tapia	UD	8	Dec 22, 2006	Cicero Stadium, Cicero, Illinois, U.S.	
13	Win	13–0	Elías López	UD	6	Oct 13, 2006	Palo Duro Golf Club, Nogales, Arizona, U.S.	
12	Win	12–0	Wayne Fletcher	KO	3 (6), 2:28	Sep 8, 2006	Gilley's Club, Dallas, Texas, U.S.	
11	Win	11–0	Juan Alfonso Figueroa	TKO	6 (8), 2:21	May 5, 2006	Activity Center, Maywood, California, U.S.	
10	Win	10–0	Freddy Castro	TKO	3 (6), 1:05	Mar 3, 2006	Activity Center, Maywood, California, U.S.	
9	Win	9–0	Joel Ortega	KO	5 (8), 1:55	Jan 20, 2006	Activity Center, Maywood, California, U.S.	
8	Win	8–0	Mike Pare	UD	4	Nov 25, 2005	Santa Ana Star Casino, Bernalillo, New Mexico, U.S.	
7	Win	7–0	Angel Eduardo Mata	UD	6	Sep 30, 2005	Steven's Steakhouse, Commerce, California, U.S.	
6	Win	6–0	Jamie Alvarado	TKO	1 (4), 2:08	Jul 15, 2005	Aragon Ballroom, Chicago, Illinois, U.S.	
5	Win	5–0	Ramon Flores	TKO	1 (4), 1:18	Jun 18, 2005	Activity Center, Maywood, California, U.S.	
4	Win	4–0	Gerardo Robles	TKO	3 (4), 1:11	Jun 3, 2005	Performing Arts Center, Oxnard, California, U.S.	
3	Win	3–0	Ricky Ponce	KO	1 (4), 1:14	Jan 28, 2005	Performing Arts Center, Oxnard, California, U.S.	
2	Win	2–0	Abraham Verdugo	TKO	2 (4), 1:15	Aug 27, 2004	Dodge Theatre, Phoenix, Arizona, U.S.	
1	Win	1–0	Raul Montes	TKO	3 (4), 1:35	Jul 23, 2004	Convention Center, Oxnard, California, U.S.	

Sporting positions
Amateur boxing titles
Previous: Aaron Garcia	U.S. featherweight champion 2004	Next: Mark Davis
Regional boxing titles
Vacant Title last held by Martin Honorio	WBC–NABF lightweight champion February 6, 2010 – September 2010; Vacated	Vacant Title next held by Hank Lundy
Vacant Title last held by Mike Dallas Jr.	WBO Latino junior welterweight champion October 13, 2012 – March 30, 2013; Failed to win interim world title	Vacant Title next held by César Cuenca
Vacant Title last held by Juan Manuel Márquez	WBO International welterweight champion January 24, 2015 – November 7, 2015; Lost bid for world title	Vacant Title next held by Manny Pacquiao
World boxing titles
Vacant Title last held by Miguel Acosta	WBA lightweight champion Regular title February 26, 2011 – December 2, 2011; Stripped	Vacant Title next held by Gervonta Davis
