= Joe Hanks =

American boxer

Personal information
- Nickname: The Future
- Born: Joe Hanks; March 27, 1983 (age 43) Newark, New Jersey, U.S.
- Height: 6 ft 1.5 in (187 cm)
- Weight: Heavyweight

Boxing career
- Stance: Orthodox

Boxing record
- Total fights: 26
- Wins: 23
- Win by KO: 15
- Losses: 3
- Draws: 0
- No contests: 0

Joe Hanks (born March 27, 1983) is an American former professional boxer who competed from 2007 to 2018.

== Professional career ==
On December 4, 2010, Hanks beat Villi Bloomfield by KO in round 4, on the undercard of Donaire-Sidorenko. On April 22, 2011, Hanks beat Terrell Nelson via a RTD in 4 rounds. In his next fight, on July 23, 2011, at Hunts Point Produce Market, Bronx, he won a unanimous decision against Alfredo Escalera Jr., which also won him the vacant IBA Americas heavyweight title. In his next fight on December 3, 2011, against Franklin Edmondson at Greensboro Coliseum Complex, Greensboro, North Carolina, Hanks won by a second-round TKO. Against the Cuban Rafael Pedro on February 4, 2012, at the Times Union Center, Albany, New York, Hanks won by a second-round TKO, as Pedro went down with an apparent dislocated shoulder. Against veteran Marcus Rhode on April 27, 2012, he scored a first-round TKO victory, as Rhode went down three times.

On December 6, 2012, Hanks defeated Maurenzo Smith in Costa Mesa, California, by a 6-round unanimous decision.

== Professional boxing record ==
26 fights	23 wins	3 losses
By knockout	15	2
By decision	8	1

No.	Result	Record	Opponent	Type	Round, time	Date	Location	Notes
26	Loss	23–3	Joe Joyce	KO	1 (10), 2:25	Dec 1, 2018	Staples Center, Los Angeles, California, U.S.	
25	Win	23–2	Terrance Marbra	TKO	1 (6), 2:26	Sep 25, 2018	Sands Bethlehem Event Center, Bethlehem, Pennsylvania, U.S.	
24	Win	22–2	Joel Caudle	UD	6	Dec 1, 2017	2300 Arena, Philadelphia, Pennsylvania, U.S.	
23	Loss	21–2	Derric Rossy	MD	10	May 16, 2014	Olympic Stadium, Montreal, Canada	
22	Loss	21–1	Andy Ruiz Jr.	TKO	4 (10), 1:41	Jul 27, 2013	Cotai Arena, Macau, SAR	For vacant WBO Inter-Continental heavyweight title
21	Win	21–0	Maurenzo Smith	UD	6	Dec 5, 2012	OC Fair & Event Center, Costa Mesa, California, U.S.	
20	Win	20–0	Marcus Rhode	TKO	1 (6), 1:36	Apr 27, 2012	Buffalo Run Casino, Miami, Oklahoma, U.S.	
19	Win	19–0	Rafael Pedro	TKO	2 (10), 0:48	Feb 4, 2012	Times Union Center, Albany, New York, U.S.	Retained IBA Americas heavyweight title
18	Win	18–0	Franklin Edmondson	TKO	2 (6), 1:25	Dec 3, 2011	Coliseum Complex, Greensboro, North Carolina, U.S.	
17	Win	17–0	Alfredo Escalera Jr	UD	10	Jul 23, 2011	Hunts Point Produce Market, Bronx, New York, U.S.	Won vacant IBA Americas heavyweight title
16	Win	16–0	Terrell Nelson	RTD	4 (6), 3:00	Apr 22, 2011	Mohegan Sun Arena, Uncasville, Connecticut, U.S.	
15	Win	15–0	Villi Bloomfield	KO	4 (6), 1:43	Dec 4, 2010	Honda Center, Anaheim, California, U.S.	
14	Win	14–0	Johnnie White	UD	6	Aug 5, 2010	Marriott Hotel, Irvine, California, U.S.	
13	Win	13–0	Anthony Gatt	KO	2 (6), 3:00	May 25, 2010	Santa Monica, Los Angeles County, California, U.S.	
12	Win	12–0	Marcus Dickerson	KO	1 (4), 0:45	May 20, 2010	Lakeside Golf Course, Burbank, California, U.S.	
11	Win	11–0	Cliff Couser	KO	1 (6), 2:22	Feb 10, 2010	Marriott Hotel, Irvine, California, U.S.	
10	Win	10–0	John Clark	UD	6	Oct 29, 2009	Marriott Hotel, Irvine, California, U.S.	
9	Win	9–0	Ashanti Jordan	UD	6	Aug 27, 2009	Marriott Hotel, Irvine, California, U.S.	
8	Win	8–0	Hildo Silva	RTD	1 (6), 3:00	Jun 11, 2009	Marriott Hotel, Irvine, California, U.S.	
7	Win	7–0	Lawson Baker	TKO	3 (6), 1:01	Apr 8, 2009	Marriott Hotel, Irvine, California, U.S.	
6	Win	6–0	Alvaro Morales	TKO	1 (4), 2:52	Mar 27, 2009	Quiet Cannon, Montebello, California, U.S.	
5	Win	5–0	Shidevin Brown	UD	4	Jan 23, 2009	Quiet Cannon, Montebello, California, U.S.	
4	Win	4–0	Leo Bercier	TKO	1 (4), 1:17	Nov 21, 2008	Quiet Cannon, Montebello, California, U.S.	
3	Win	3–0	Ali Malik	TKO	2 (4), 0:21	May 17, 2008	Aviator Sports & Events Center, Bronx, New York, U.S.	
2	Win	2–0	Corey Winfield	UD	4	Apr 25, 2008	Paradise Theater, Bronx, New York, U.S.	
1	Win	1–0	Joseph Rabotte	TKO	2 (4), 1:18	Dec 6, 2007	Paradise Theater, Bronx, New York, U.S.	
