= Brandon Ríos vs. Urbano Antillón =

Boxing match

- Date: July 9, 2011
- Venue: Home Depot Center, Carson, California, U.S.
- Title(s) on the line: WBA (Regular) lightweight championship

Tale of the tape
Boxer	Brandon Ríos	Urbano Antillón
Nickname	"Bam Bam"	"Azteca"
Hometown	Oxnard, California, U.S.	Maywood, California, U.S.
Pre-fight record	27–0–1 (20 KO)	28–2 (20 KO)
Age	25 years, 2 months	28 years, 10 months
Height	5 ft 10 in (178 cm)	5 ft 8 in (173 cm)
Weight	135 lb (61 kg)	134 3/4 lb (61 kg)
Style	Orthodox	Orthodox
Recognition	WBA (Regular); Lightweight Champion; The Ring; No. 2 Ranked Lightweight	WBA; No. 11 Ranked Lightweight; The Ring; No. 9 Ranked Lightweight

Result
- Ríos defeats Antillón by 3rd round TKO

Brandon Ríos vs. Urbano Antillón was a professional boxing match contested on July 9, 2011, for the WBA (Regular) Lightweight championship. The bout was at Home Depot Center, in Carson, California, United States and televised on Showtime.

== Background ==
A bout between both Ríos and Antillón was to take place on the undercard of Antonio Margarito vs. Roberto García. The fight was called off due to a cut sustained during sparring on the eyebrow of Ríos.

Antillón was a 11/2 betting underdog.

=== Entrance performers ===
The Mexican singer José Manuel Figueroa performed as Ríos entered the arena.

== The fight ==
Ríos stopped Antillón to retain his belt.

== Aftermath ==
Speaking after the bout Ríos said "I said before this fight would come down to who could take a punch best. I was that guy. I knew I was going to win because I was younger and stronger. I’ll fight anyone at 135. Give me all the big names. I want them all!"

== Main card ==
Confirmed bouts:

- Lightweight Championship (United States) Brandon Ríos vs. (United States) Urbano Antillón
  - Ríos defeated Antillón via technical knockout at 2:39 in the third round.
- Light Middleweight bout: (Mexico) Carlos Molina vs. (Puerto Rico) Kermit Cintrón
  - Molina defeated Cintron via unanimous decision (98–92, 98–92, 98–92).

=== Preliminary card ===
- Lightweight bout: (United States) José Javier Román vs. (United States) Randy Arrellin
  - Román defeated Arrellin via knockout at 2:07 in the first round.
- Featherweight bout: (United States) Gabino Sáenz vs. (United States) Quincy Wesby
  - Sáenz defeated Wesby via knockout at 1:41 in the third round.
- Middleweight bout: (Russia) Matt Korobov vs. (Cuba) Lester González Perez
  - Korobov defeated Perez via unanimous decision (78–74, 78–74, 78–74).
- Welterweight bout: (Mexico) Alonso Loeza vs. (United States) Ricardo Malfavon
  - Loeza and Malfavon fought to a majority draw (37–39, 38-38, 38-38).
- Light Heavyweight bout: (United States) Mike Lee vs. (United States) Michael Birthmark
  - Lee defeated Birthmark via knockout at 2:56 in the third round.
- Super Featherweight bout: (Australia) Paul Fleming vs. (Mexico) Juan Jose Beltran
  - Fleming defeated Beltran via knockout at 0:52 in the first round.
- Lightweight bout: (United States) Mercito Gesta vs. (Mexico) Jorge Pimentel
  - Gesta defeated Pimentel via knockout at 2:23 in the third round.

== Broadcasting ==
Country	Broadcaster
Mexico	Azteca
United States	Showtime

Preceded by vs. Miguel Acosta	Brandon Ríos's bouts 9 July 2011	Succeeded by vs. John Murray
Preceded by vs. Humberto Soto	Urbano Antillón's bouts 9 July 2011	Succeeded by vs. Leonardo Resendiz
