= Eleven Sports (Portugal) =

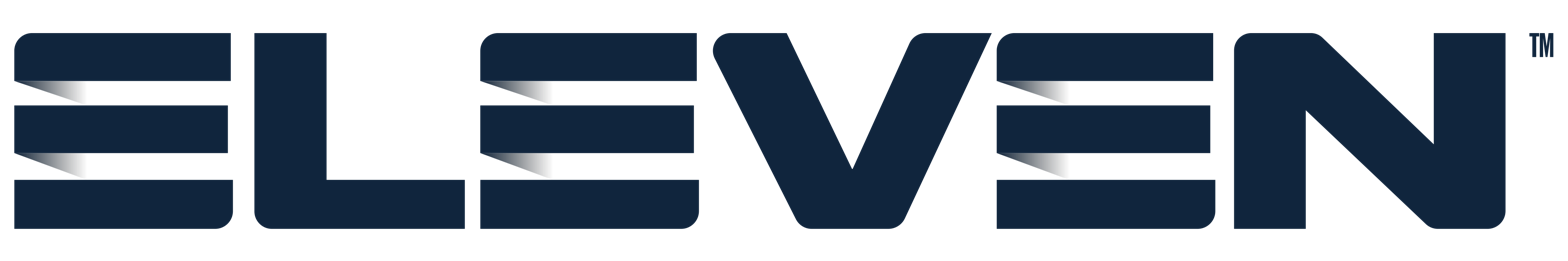
- Country: Portugal
- Broadcast area: Portugal
- Headquarters: Lisbon, Portugal

Programming
- Picture format: Resolution: OTT: 1080p (HDTV); Linear: 576i (SDTV); 1080i (HDTV); Aspect Ratio: 16:9

Ownership
- Owner: DAZN Group

History
- Launched: 15 August 2018
- Founder: Andrea Radrizzani
- Closed: 5 July 2024

Eleven Sports was a Portuguese sports-oriented premium cable, satellite and IPTV television network with six premium channels and an OTT service. It was owned by Andrea Radrizzani and DAZN Group (executive of the sports marketing MP & Silva) and The Channel Company. The operator opened its doors in Portugal in 2018 with the purchase of Champions League and Spanish League rights.

== History ==
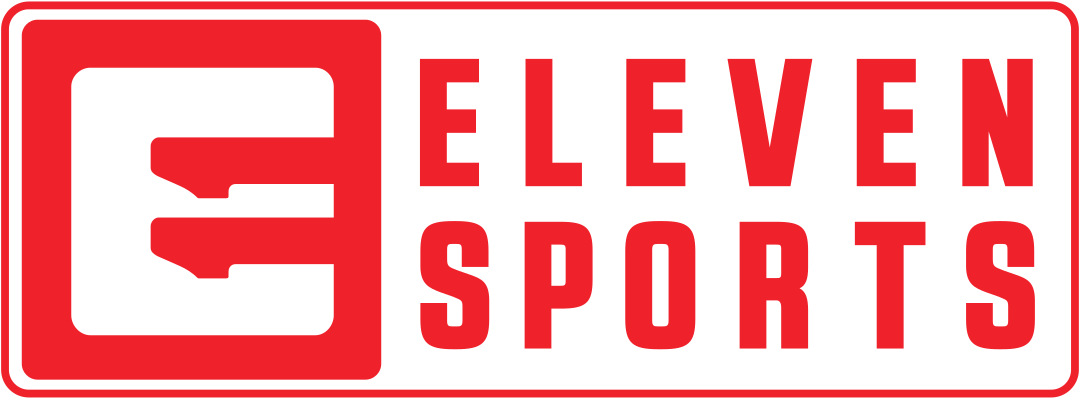
Logo 2018-2020

In May 2018, Eleven Sports announced the purchase of the rights of the UEFA Champions League and LaLiga Santander for the Portuguese market. On the same month, Eleven announced a distribution partner with Portuguese telco Nowo.

In June 2018 it was announced the purchase of the rights to three French football league competitions: Ligue 1, Coupe de la Ligue and Trophée des Champions. On 19 June 2018 Eleven announced that it had purchased the rights to broadcast the Scottish Premiership, Belgian Pro League (starting in 2018-19 season) and Bundesliga (starting only on the 2019-20 season)

At an interview with local newspaper Expresso, Danny Menken (Eleven's Group Managing Director) referred that Eleven Sports will comprise as a premium package of two 24/7 HD channels (with 4 pop-up channels for overflow coverage) costing less than €10 per month (with discounts for season pass subscribers). The package was launched on 15 August 2018, the day of the 2018 UEFA Super Cup. On 29 June 2018 it was officially announced that Eleven Sports will have two offerings: a linear offering with two 24/7 channels in HD (with 4 pop-up channels for overflow coverage) and an OTT streaming offer. Both options will cost €9.99.

On 3 December 2019 Eleven Sports announced it would trial an entry into the PPV market in Portugal with the Andy Ruiz Jr. vs. Anthony Joshua II fight. This was the first time a broadcaster engaged in PPV broadcasts after TVCabo (currently NOS) broadcast a select amount of movies between 2005 and 2010 under the "VOD" brand. Current (at the time) Eleven Sports subscribers had access to the event with no extra charge.

In September 2022, DAZN announced that it would acquire Eleven's sports media businesses, ELEVEN and Team Whistle; the purchase expanding its presence in Asia and Western Europe. The deal was finalized on February 15, 2023. With the exception of content in Belgium, Portugal, and Taiwan were rebranded as DAZN Eleven Sports later in the same month with the Eleven brand existing only as linear channel in Portugal, Belgium and Taiwan until July 2024 after they were replaced as part of DAZN's linear channels.

== Rights ==
=== Association football ===
- (Europe) UEFA Champions League
- (Europe) UEFA Super Cup
- (Europe) UEFA Youth League
- (Belgium) Jupiler Pro League
- (Belgium) Belgian Super Cup
- (England) Premier League
- (France) Ligue 1 Uber Eats
- (France) Trophée des Champions
- (Germany) Bundesliga
- (Germany) 2. Bundesliga
- (Germany) DFB-Pokal
- (Germany) DFL-Supercup
- (Spain) LaLiga EA Sports
- (Spain) Supercopa

=== Basketball ===
- (Spain) Liga Endesa
- (Spain) Copa del Rey de Baloncesto
- (Spain) Supercopa Endesa

=== Futsal ===
- (Europe) UEFA Futsal Champions League (final four only)

=== Gridiron football ===
- (United States) NFL

=== Kickboxing ===
- (Netherlands) Enfusion

=== MMA ===
- (Russia) M-1 Global
- (United States) PFL
- (France) Hexagone MMA

=== Motorsports ===
- Formula E
- (United States) NASCAR Cup Series

=== Padel ===
- World Padel Tour

=== Rink Hockey ===
- (Europe) WSE Champions League

=== Tennis ===
- ATP 250
- Laver Cup
- WTA Tour

== See also ==
- A Bola TV
- Eurosport
- Sport TV
