= Tor Hamer =

American boxer

Personal information
- Born: Tor Hamer; January 20, 1983 (age 43) New York City, New York, U.S.
- Height: 6 ft 2 in (188 cm)
- Weight: Heavyweight

Boxing career
- Stance: Orthodox

Boxing record
- Total fights: 24
- Wins: 21
- Win by KO: 14
- Losses: 3
- Draws: 0
- No contests: 0
Medal record
Men's amateur boxing
Golden Gloves
Gold medal – first place	2008 Grand Rapids	Super heavyweight
U.S. National Championships
Silver medal – second place	2008 Colorado Springs	Super heavyweight

Tor Hamer (born January 20, 1983) is an American former professional boxer who competed from 2008 to 2013. As an amateur, he won the 2008 Golden Gloves.

== Early life ==
Raised in Harlem as well as suburban Baltimore, he attended private and charter schools until attending Penn State for his B.A. He has a Harvard-educated father and a Villanova-educated mother, both of whom work in education. He is the grandson of noted civil rights activist Fannie Lou Hamer.

== Amateur career ==
Hamer was trained at Gleason's Gym. At the National Championships, he narrowly lost to southpaw and eventual winner Lenroy Thompson. He later beat him in the Golden Gloves quarterfinals to avenge his only loss. His amateur record was 34–1.

== Professional career ==
After his Golden Gloves victory in May 2008, Hamer was approached by boxing's premier promoters: Oscar De La Hoya, Don King and Lou DiBella, ultimately signing with DiBella Entertainment.

He made his professional debut on October 22, 2008, defeating Joseph Rabotte via second-round TKO. He suffered his first loss, on points, to undefeated Kelvin Price. In June 2012 he won the second edition of the Prizefighter International Heavyweights, which took place in London. After beating Marcelo Nascimento by unanimous decision and knocking out Tom Dallas (15–2) in 29 seconds, he beat the pre-tournament betting favorite Kevin Johnson (26–1) in the final. Later, however, he lost against Vyacheslav Glazkov and Andy Ruiz by way of forfeit on both occasions.

== Professional boxing record ==
24 fights	21 wins	3 losses
By knockout	14	2
By decision	7	1

No.	Result	Record	Opponent	Type	Round, time	Date	Location	Notes
24	Loss	21–3	Andy Ruiz Jr.	RTD	3 (10), 3:00	Nov 23, 2013	Cotai Arena, Macau, China	For WBO Inter-Continental and vacant WBC-NABF heavyweight titles
23	LWin	21–2	Kertson Manswell	TKO	1 (8), 3:00	Aug 14, 2013	BB King Blues Club & Grill, New York City, New York, U.S.	
22	Win	20–2	Maurenzo Smith	TKO	3 (8), 1:31	May 15, 2013	BB King Blues Club & Grill, New York City, New York, U.S.	
21	Loss	19–2	Vyacheslav Glazkov	RTD	4 (8), 3:00	Dec 22, 2012	Sands Casino Resort, Bethlehem, Pennsylvania, U.S.	
20	Win	19–1	Dominique Alexander	TKO	2 (10), 1:02	Oct 12, 2012	Ameristar Casino Resort Spa, St. Charles, Missouri, U.S.	
19	Win	18–1	Kevin Johnson	UD	3	Jun 20, 2012	York Hall, London, England	Prizefighter 25: heavyweight final
18	Win	17–1	Tom Dallas	TKO	1 (3), 0:29	Jun 20, 2012	York Hall, London, England	Prizefighter 25: heavyweight semi-final
17	Win	16–1	Marcelo Nascimento	UD	3	Jun 20, 2012	York Hall, London, England	Prizefighter 25: heavyweight quarter-final
16	Win	15–1	Galen Brown	UD	6	Apr 27, 2012	Buffalo Run Casino, Miami, Oklahoma, U.S.	
15	Win	14–1	Dieuly Aristilde	KO	2 (6), 2:59	Mar 7, 2012	BB King Blues Club & Grill, New York City, New York, U.S.	
14	Win	13–1	Demetrice King	UD	8	Dec 1, 2010	BB King Blues Club & Grill, New York City, New York, U.S.	
13	Win	12–1	Terrell Nelson	KO	1 (6), 2:11	Oct 6, 2010	BB King Blues Club & Grill, New York City, New York, U.S.	
12	Loss	11–1	Kelvin Price	SD	6	May 15, 2010	Madison Square Garden, New York City, New York, U.S.	
11	Win	11–0	Alexis Mejias	UD	6	Mar 31, 2010	BB King Blues Club & Grill, New York City, New York, U.S.	
10	Win	10–0	Mazur Ali	TKO	1 (6), 1:38	Dec 16, 2009	BB King Blues Club & Grill, New York City, New York, U.S.	
9	Win	9–0	Howard Jones	TKO	1 (6), 0:22	Oct 2, 2009	First Council Casino, Newkirk, Oklahoma, U.S.	
8	Win	8–0	Theron Johnson	UD	6	Aug 26, 2009	BB King Blues Club & Grill, New York City, New York, U.S.	
7	Win	7–0	Marcus Dickerson	KO	1 (6), 1:25	Jul 18, 2009	Plattduetsche Park Restaurant, Franklin Square, New York, U.S.	
6	Win	6–0	Samuel Brown	TKO	2 (4), 1:10	May 30, 2009	Hard Rock Live, Hollywood, Florida, U.S.	
5	Win	5–0	Kelsey Arnold	UD	4	Apr 3, 2009	Pepsi Pavilion, Memphis, Tennessee, U.S.	
4	Win	4–0	Clarence Tillman	TKO	1 (4)	Feb 25, 2009	BB King Blues Club & Grill, New York City, New York, U.S.	
3	Win	3–0	Darion Moss	TKO	2 (4), 1:53	Jan 17, 2009	Beau Rivage, Biloxi, Mississippi, U.S.	
2	Win	2–0	Royal Bryant	TKO	1 (4), 2:17	Dec 4, 2008	Roseland Ballroom, New York City, New York, U.S.	
1	Win	1–0	Joseph Rabotte	TKO	2 (4), 0:44	Oct 22, 2008	BB King Blues Club & Grill, New York City, New York, U.S.	

Sporting positions
Tournament boxing titles
Previous: Mike Perez	Prizefighter 25: heavyweight tournament champion 20 June 2012	Next: Audley Harrison
