= Jorge Teron =

Puerto Rican-American boxer

Personal information
- Nickname: The Truth
- Nationality: American
- Born: Jorge Luis Teron; June 5, 1985 (age 41) Bronx, New York
- Height: 6 ft 0 in (183 cm)
- Weight: Light Welterweight; Lightweight

Boxing career
- Reach: 75 in (191 cm)
- Stance: Orthodox

Boxing record
- Total fights: 29
- Wins: 25
- Win by KO: 17
- Losses: 3
- Draws: 1
- No contests: 0

Jorge Luis Teron (born June 5, 1985) is a Puerto Rican-American professional boxer. Teron is the former NABO Lightweight champion.

== Amateur career ==
Born and raised in the Bronx, Teron is the median kid of family, has two brothers. Carlos Teron, born in 1992, his younger brother is also a young amateur. Teron had begun boxing at the age of 13, with his father's collimation at Webster PAL. His amateur record consists 86–9, achieved three times consecutive New York Golden Gloves championship in two different weight divisions, featherweight-novice, and lightweight-open between 2002 and 2004.

== Professional career ==
Teron turned into professional when he was 20, in 2005. Teron started his career with flashing results, finishing his first 4 bouts with KOs in early 2005. His ascending trend continued with 10 straight victories until his fight against Armando Cordoba which finalized as a draw on June 30, 2006. The duo had a revenge just 26 days later and Teron dispatched his opponent by unanimous decision after 6 rounds. Teron then achieved one more pretty successful victory row, sum of 12 fights since July 2006.

In December 2008, Teron lost the first bout of his professional career against Aldo Valtierra. Teron defeated Valtierra in a rematch 5 months later. In February 2010, Teron fought top Lightweight contender, Mexican American Brandon Rios for the vacant NABF Lightweight title. Teron would suffer his second loss to Rios.

== Personal life ==
Teron worked with Mark Breland, a former World and Olympic champion since his 10th pro bout against Marcus Luck. His manager was Steven Heid.

He studied successively at JFK High School in his native borough and, at the Business Administration Department of Bronx Community College. He sparred with Dmitriy Salita and Edgar Santana at Gleason's Gym.

According to Showbox pro-fight preview for the fight against Michael Lozada, Teron grew up with his grandmother due to his mother is in a wheelchair. Additionally, this fight was broadcast live on Pan-European sports channel Eurosport, as its first ever bout in European TVs, on August 1, 2008.

He also trained with WBO world title contender Zahir Raheem for a while in Atlanta.
