= Anthony Joshua vs. Andy Ruiz Jr. =

Boxing match

- Date: June 1, 2019
- Venue: Madison Square Garden, New York City, New York, U.S.
- Title(s) on the line: WBA (Super), IBF, WBO and IBO heavyweight titles

Tale of the tape
Boxer	Anthony Joshua	Andy Ruiz Jr.
Nickname	AJ	Destroyer
Hometown	London, England	Imperial, California, U.S.
Purse	$19,000,000	$7,000,000
Pre-fight record	22–0 (21 KO)	32–1 (21 KO)
Age	29 years, 7 months	29 years, 8 months
Height	6 ft 7 in (201 cm)	6 ft 1 in (185 cm)
Weight	247.8 lb (112 kg)	268 lb (122 kg)
Style	Orthodox	Orthodox
Recognition	WBA (Super), IBF, WBO and IBO; Heavyweight Champion; The Ring/TBRB; No. 1 Ranked Heavyweight	WBA; No. 5 Ranked Heavyweight; WBO; No. 11 Ranked Heavyweight; IBF; No. 14 Ranked Heavyweight

Result
- Ruiz Jr. wins via 7th-round technical knockout

Anthony Joshua vs. Andy Ruiz Jr. was a heavyweight professional boxing match contested between undefeated and unified WBA (Super), IBF, WBO, and IBO champion Anthony Joshua, and former world title challenger Andy Ruiz Jr. The bout took place on June 1, 2019, at Madison Square Garden in New York City, New York. Joshua was originally scheduled to face undefeated WBA No. 2 and WBO No. 3 ranked heavyweight Jarrell Miller, who was replaced by Ruiz Jr. after Miller failed three drug tests.

After coming in as a 25–1 underdog, in a shocking upset, Ruiz Jr. won the match via technical knockout in the seventh round, ending Joshua's undefeated record and becoming the new unified heavyweight champion. Ruiz became the only American boxer to win the unified heavyweight championship since Hasim Rahman in 2001. The fight is considered one of the biggest upsets in boxing history, drawing comparisons to Mike Tyson vs. Buster Douglas in 1990 and Lennox Lewis vs. Hasim Rahman in 2001.

== Background ==
Andy Ruiz Jr. had lost his only previous shot to become a heavyweight champion back in December 2016, when he lost to Joseph Parker by close razor thin majority decision. Ruiz stated how he felt like he won and wanted a rematch but the fight never took place. Meanwhile, Parker made two defenses of his WBO title until he lost to unified heavyweight champion Anthony Joshua in March 2018. Joshua since then made his next defense against Alexander Povetkin, which he stopped in the seventh round.

Joshua had repeatedly spoken of his desire to fight the undefeated WBC champion Deontay Wilder for all four world titles, but with the American expected to fight Tyson Fury in a rematch in Las Vegas in April before the fight was cancelled, he needed an alternative opponent and insisted Dillian Whyte would then be the leading candidate. The 30-year-old Whyte called Joshua out once Derek Chisora had recovered from his 11th-round knockout, but Joshua, 29, and unusually booed by many of those present at The O2, said: “If Deontay Wilder is serious and he is going to fight Tyson Fury and doesn’t want to become undisputed champion, Dillian you will get a title shot."

On 29 December 2018, with Joshua's Wembley date still on hold, Hearn stated that Whyte was the frontrunner to challenge Joshua. Whilst still waiting for Hearn to contact him, Whyte claimed to hear rumours that Joshua would cancel the Wembley date and instead fight American contender Jarrell Miller at Madison Square Garden. On 12 January 2019, Whyte revealed that he had turned down a "severe lowball" offer from Joshua to fight him in a rematch. Whyte did not reveal the figure, however he claimed it was lower than what he received against Chisora in December 2018. By 21 January, Hearn stated there was a possibility Joshua would fight in the United States instead. According to Hearn, it was Joshua who was making the offer for the Whyte fight. Whyte claimed Joshua did not want to fight him, as he had known since September 2018, that he would be fighting in April 2019, yet did not make any offers. On 1 February, Hearn admitted it was becoming highly unlikely that Joshua would still fight at Wembley Stadium on 13 April. On 2 February, Whyte claimed the Joshua fight "was dead" and he was to look at other options, including a potential fight with Dominic Breazeale. According to Miller, Joshua initially offered Whyte $3 million, then increased the offer to $5 million, only to go down to $3.5 million.

On 8 February, terms were agreed for Joshua to defend his unified heavyweight titles against Miller (23–0–1, 20 KOs) on 1 June at Madison Square Garden in New York City, marking Joshua's US debut. The event became the highest grossing pre-sale in the arena's boxing history. It was reported that Joshua would pocket £19.3 million (equivalent to $25 million). Another report claimed Joshua was to earn an estimated $32 million. Miller's deal with DAZN ensured he received a career-high purse of $4.875 million, which would include two more bouts on DAZN worth $3 million.

=== Miller's drug test ===
On 17 April 2019, both camps confirmed the Voluntary Anti-Doping Association had informed them that Miller had tested positive for the banned substance GW1516. The test results were from a random VADA-conducted urine test Miller submitted to on March 20. Further tests taken on March 31 proved positive for EPO, HGH and GW1516 again.

Miller was denied a boxing license by the New York State Athletic Commission and Joshua's promoter Eddie Hearn said Joshua was looking for a new opponent.

=== New opponent ===
Many boxers, including Ivan Dychko and Manuel Charr put their names forward to fight Joshua instead. Hearn reportedly spoke to 16 heavyweights in the space of 24 hours. Luis Ortiz was the first name that Joshua wanted as a replacement. Hearn was adamant that Joshua would still fight on that date as 17,000 tickets had already been sold, with 10,000 of those being from Britain.

Prior to his fight with Alexander Dimitrenko on April 20 former world title challenger Andy Ruiz Jr. (31–1, 20 KOs) put his name forward to replace Miller and challenge Joshua for the unified heavyweight titles on June 1, 2019. On April 22, Ruiz confirmed his team had a meeting scheduled with promoter Hearn, officially putting himself in the running. Ruiz became a frontrunner after it was reported Luis Ortiz's team had rejected two offers of career high purses to fight Joshua. Terms were agreed within a week. On May 1, with one month to go before fight night, Joshua vs. Ruiz was confirmed and announced to take place at Madison Square Garden in New York City exclusively live streamed on DAZN in the United States and PPV on Sky Sports Box Office in the United Kingdom. It was reported that Ruiz would earn around $7 million (£5.36 million) for the bout. In preparation for the fight, Andy Ruiz watched videos of Mike Tyson, working on some of the techniques he used to beat larger heavyweights, and identified weaknesses in Anthony Joshua that he could exploit.

== The fight ==
Rounds one and two of the fight were relatively slow, with both Ruiz and Joshua feeling each other out. Through the first two rounds, Joshua had only landed nine punches out of forty seven thrown, and Ruiz only three out of thirty one thrown. Round three, however, would mark a drastic turning point in the fight.

With two minutes and seventeen seconds remaining in round three, Joshua knocked down Ruiz for the first time in his career. Ruiz rose to his feet, responded to instructions, and seemingly unfazed by Joshua's power, quickly resumed attacking. Mere moments after having hit the canvas himself, Ruiz responded with a succession of heavy punches; despite hitting Ruiz with repeated jabs to the face, Joshua was caught off guard by a blow to the temple which visibly staggered him, after which Ruiz quickly forced him off his feet. Joshua was able to get back up, but did not respond as aggressively as Ruiz had, instead choosing to remain on the defensive following the surprise of being knocked down. Just before the close of round three, Ruiz again managed to fell a clearly disoriented Joshua after forcing him into a corner and unleashing a series of power punches. As he got up, Joshua took the mandatory eight count before raising his gloves, indicating to the referee that he was physically able to continue. Round three ended with both fighters advancing toward one another momentarily before they were interrupted by the bell signalling the end of the round.

Rounds four, five, and six consisted of minor exchanges between Ruiz and Joshua, with both fighters seeking a mid-round rally to boost their points on the scorecards. With two minutes and twenty seven seconds remaining in round seven, Ruiz knocked over Joshua once again with a short sequence of heavy blows. In spite of this, Joshua managed to get back on his feet once again, and was able to engage Ruiz briefly before being floored for a fourth and final time, with one minute and fifty nine seconds left in the round. Almost immediately after dropping to the canvas, Joshua spat out his mouthpiece before rising, turned away from the referee, and walked somewhat unsteadily back to his corner. Joshua then faced the referee Michael Griffin, arms resting on the ropes, and began talking to him. Seemingly disoriented and hesitant to continue the match, Joshua's responses to questioning were deemed insufficient, resulting in the referee waving off the fight. The referee subsequently awarded Ruiz a round seven TKO victory, making him the first Mexican-American and second Hispanic heavyweight champion in boxing history.

At the time the bout was stopped, Ruiz was ahead on two of the judges scorecards by 57–56, while the third had Joshua winning by 57–56.

== Aftermath ==
A massive underdog entering the fight, many regarded Ruiz as nothing more than a replacement who stood little to no chance against the heavily favored Joshua. The fight was immediately considered to be one of the greatest upsets in heavyweight boxing history, garnering comparisons to Buster Douglas’ upset victory over Mike Tyson in 1990 and Hasim Rahman's upset victory over Lennox Lewis in 2001. Joshua commented afterwards, "It’s an upset, isn’t it... But the better man won. Respect to Andy. Now I move forward."

With Ruiz coming in as a 25–1 underdog, the fight has been described as one of the biggest upsets in boxing history. Talksport ranks it the second greatest upset in heavyweight boxing history, after Mike Tyson vs. Buster Douglas. Newsroom calls it, "Shock of the century". Ruiz also made history as the first ever world heavyweight champion of Mexican heritage.

== Viewership ==
On Sky Sports Box Office, the fight sold 652,000 pay-per-view buys in the United Kingdom, where it aired at 3.30 am on Sunday morning.

The fight set an online piracy viewership record, with live illegal streams watched by more than 13 million viewers worldwide, surpassing Deontay Wilder vs. Tyson Fury. 93% of the illegal online viewership came from unauthorised streams that appeared on YouTube. The countries with the highest online piracy viewership were Nigeria with 2.35 million viewers, followed by Kenya and the United Kingdom with nearly 1 million viewers each. This is equivalent to a potential loss of nearly £20 million ($27 million) for Sky Sports Box Office in the United Kingdom. According to market analytics company MUSO, the fight was "the largest unauthorised audience that we've ever tracked across boxing" and represents "a massive audience that's being ignored."

The fight's official highlight video on DAZN's YouTube channel was the #1 trending video on YouTube, with more than 4 million views in less than 24 hours, and more than 10 million views as of June 7, 2019. This made it the most-watched boxing video ever on DAZN's YouTube channel, and the most-watched boxing video on YouTube during the first six months of 2019. As of June 7, 2019, the official DAZN highlight video also had over 6 million views on Twitter and over 1.6 million views on Facebook.

== Rematch ==
On 8 August 2019, it was announced that Joshua would get his rematch against Ruiz for the WBA (Super), IBF, WBO and IBO heavyweight titles.

The fight took place on 7 December 2019 in Diriyah, the UNESCO World Heritage site of Al-Turaif, Riyadh, Saudi Arabia, after Ruiz claimed he would refuse to fight in the UK, following Dillian Whyte's failed drugs test. At the event, Joshua reclaimed his heavyweight titles after defeating Ruiz via unanimous decision.

== Fight card ==
Confirmed bouts:

Weight Class	Weight		vs.		Method	Round	Time	Notes
Heavyweight	>200 lb	(United States) Andy Ruiz Jr.	def.	(United Kingdom) Anthony Joshua (c)	TKO	7/12	1:33	^{Note 1}
Super Middleweight	168 lb	(United Kingdom) Callum Smith (c)	def.	(Cameroon) Hassan N'Dam	TKO	3/12	2:56	^{Note 2}
Lightweight	135 lb	(Republic of Ireland) Katie Taylor (c)	def.	(Belgium) Delfine Persoon (c)	MD	10		^{Note 3}
Welterweight	147 lb	(United Kingdom) Josh Kelly	vs.	(United States) Ray Robinson	MD	10		^{Note 4}
Light-Heavyweight	175 lb	(United Kingdom) Joshua Buatsi	def.	(Mexico) Marco Antonio Periban	TKO	4/10	1:39	^{Note 5}
Light Welterweight	140 lb	(United States) Chris Algieri	def.	(United Kingdom) Tommy Coyle	RTD	8/12		^{Note 6}
Non-TV bouts
Super Middleweight	168 lb	(United States) Diego Pacheco	def.	(United States) Jared Chauvin	TKO	1/4	1:50
Super Middleweight	168 lb	(United States) Austin Williams	def.	(United States) Quadeer Jenkins	TKO	1/4	2:14

^Note 1 For WBA (Super), IBF, WBO and IBO heavyweight titles
^Note 2 For WBA (Super), and The Ring super middleweight titles
^Note 3 For WBA, WBC, IBF, WBO, and vacant The Ring female lightweight titles
^Note 4 For WBA International welterweight title
^Note 5 For WBA International light heavyweight title
^Note 6 For WBO International junior welterweight title

== International broadcasting ==
Country/Region	Broadcasters			
Country/Region	Free-to-air	Cable/Pay television	PPV	Stream
United States (host)	—N/a			DAZN
Austria	—N/a			DAZN
Brazil	—N/a			DAZN
Canada	—N/a			DAZN
Germany	—N/a			DAZN
Italy	—N/a			DAZN
Japan	—N/a			DAZN
Spain	—N/a			DAZN
Switzerland	—N/a			DAZN
United Kingdom	—N/a		Sky Sports Box Office	
Ireland	—N/a		Sky Sports Box Office	
Mexico	Azteca 7	—N/a		Azteca En Vivo
Mexico	—N/a	Space	—N/a	Space Go
Latin America: Argentina; Chile; Colombia; Ecuador; Mexico; Panama; Peru; Uruguay; Venezuela	—N/a	Space	—N/a	Space Go
Australia	—N/a		Main Event	—N/a
Bulgaria	—N/a	Diema Sport	—N/a	Play Diema Extra
Caribbean	—N/a	Flow Sports	—N/a	Flow To Go
Croatia	RTL	—N/a		RTL Play
France	—N/a	RMC Sport	—N/a	RMC Sport
Indonesia	tvOne	—N/a		VIVA
New Zealand	—N/a		SKY Arena	—N/a
Nordic countries: Denmark; Finland; Norway; Sweden	—N/a		Viaplay	
Panama	—N/a	Cable Onda Sports	—N/a	Cable Onda Go
Poland	TVP Sport	—N/a		TVP Stream
Russia	Match TV			
Sub-Saharan Africa: Angola; Benin; Botswana; Burkina Faso; Burundi; Cameroon; Cape Verde; Central African Republic; Chad; Comoros; Congo; DR Congo; Djibouti; Equatorial Guinea; Eritrea; Eswatini; Ethiopia; Gabon; Gambia; Ghana; Guinea; Guinea-Bissau; Ivory Coast; Kenya; Lesotho; Liberia; Madagascar; Malawi; Mali; Mauritania; Mauritius; Mozambique; Namibia; Niger; Nigeria; Rwanda; Sao Tome and Principe; Senegal; Sierra Leone; Somalia; South Africa; South Sudan; Sudan; Seychelles; Tanzania; Togo; Uganda; Zimbabwe; Zambia	Kwesé Sports		—N/a	Kwesé iflix
Tajikistan	TV Varzish	—N/a		Mediabay
Uzbekistan	Uzreport TV	—N/a		Mediabay
Turkey	—N/a	SSport	—N/a	SSport+
Ukraine	XSPORT	—N/a		XSPORT

== See also ==
- Andy Ruiz Jr. vs Anthony Joshua II

Preceded by vs. Alexander Povetkin	Anthony Joshua' bouts June 1, 2019	Succeeded by Rematch
Preceded by vs. Alexander Dimitrenko	Andy Ruiz Jr.'s bouts June 1, 2019	Succeeded by Rematch
Awards
Previous: Daigo Higa vs. Cristofer Rosales	The Ring Upset of the Year; 2019	Next: Vasiliy Lomachenko vs. Teófimo López
Preceded by Deontay Wilder vs. Tyson Fury; Round 12	The Ring Round of the Year; Round 3; 2019	Succeeded by Jose Zepeda vs. Ivan Baranchyk; Round 5
