= Carlos Madrid =

Mexican boxer (born 1977)

Carlos Madrid (born December 7, 1977, in Ciudad Juárez, Chihuahua, Mexico) is a Mexican professional boxer in the Light Welterweight division.

== Pro career ==
One of his best performances in the ring was against an undefeated Puerto Rican, Mike Gonzalez. The fight would end in a draw but many ringside thought that Madrid should have received the victory.

In May 2007, Carlos lost to the undefeated Mexican American Brandon Rios in Isleta Casino & Resort, Albuquerque, New Mexico.

On March 28, 2008, Madrid lost to the undefeated Mexican American John Molina jr. in City of Industry, California.
