= Manny Pacquiao vs. Brandon Ríos =

Boxing match

The Clash in Cotai
- Date: 24 November 2013
- Venue: Cotai Arena, The Venetian, Macau, SAR
- Title(s) on the line: vacant WBO International welterweight title

Tale of the tape
Boxer	Manny Pacquiao	Brandon Rios
Nickname	"Pac-Man"	"Bam-Bam"
Hometown	General Santos, South Cotabato, Philippines	Lubbock, Texas, U.S.
Pre-fight record	54–5–2 (38 KO)	31–1–1 (23 KO)
Age	34 years, 11 months	27 years, 6 months
Height	5 ft 6 1/2 in (169 cm)	5 ft 8 in (173 cm)
Weight	145 lb (66 kg)	146 1/2 lb (66 kg)
Style	Southpaw	Orthodox
Recognition	WBO; No. 1 Ranked Welterweight; The Ring; No. 2 Ranked Welterweight; TBRB; No. 4 Ranked Welterweight; The Ring No. 7 ranked pound-for-pound fighter 8-division world champion	WBO; No. 2 Ranked Welterweight; The Ring; No. 7 Ranked Light Welterweight; TBRB; No. 6 Ranked Light Welterweight

Result
- Pacquiao wins via 12-round unanimous decision (120–108, 119–109, 118–110)

Manny Pacquiao vs. Brandon Ríos, billed as The Clash in Cotai, was a professional boxing match contested on 24 November 2013, for the WBO International welterweight championship.

== Background ==
The bout was held at the Venetian Macau resort & hotel in Macau.

== The fight ==
Pacquiao won via unanimous decision and took the vacant WBO International welterweight title.

== Aftermath ==
Pacquiao said that the fight would be dedicated to the victims of the recent typhoon hit in the Philippines. The fight drew 475,000 ppv buys.

== National anthems ==
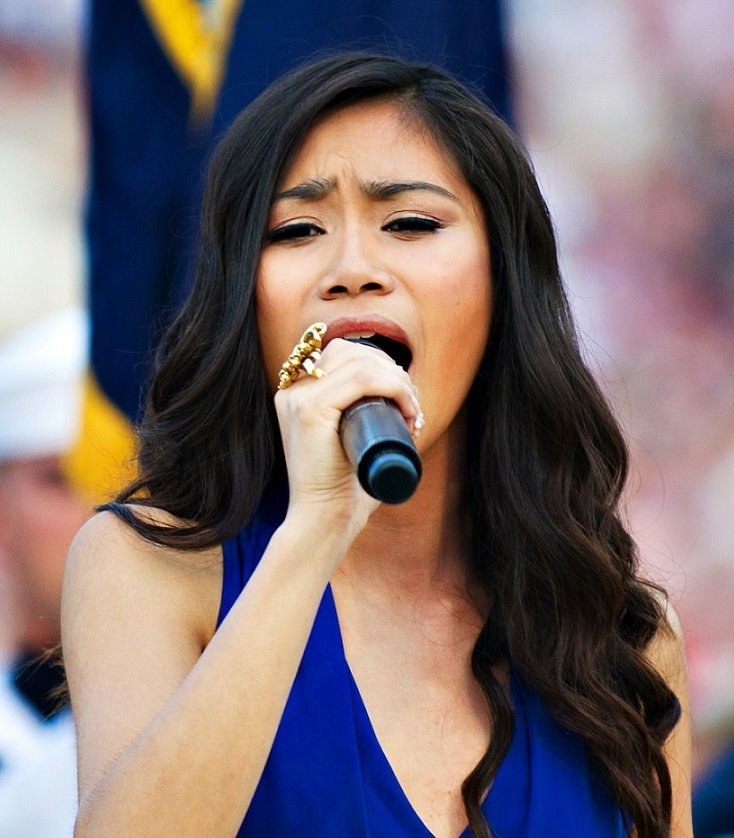
Jessica Sanchez sang both National Anthems.

- United States (The Star-Spangled Banner)
- Philippines (Lupang Hinirang)

== Fight card ==
Confirmed bouts:

=== Main bouts (HBO PPV) ===
- WBO Welterweight bout: Manny Pacquiao vs. Brandon Ríos
  - Pacquiao won via unanimous decision
- IBF Featherweight bout: Evgeny Gradovich (c) vs. Billy Dib
  - Gradovich won via 9th round TKO.
- NABF Heavyweight bout: Andy Ruiz vs. Tor Hamer (c)
  - Ruiz won via technical knockout, due to Hamer quitting before the start of the 4th round.
- Flyweight bout: Zou Shiming vs. Juan Tozcano
  - Shiming won via unanimous decision.
- Lightweight bout: Félix Verdejo vs. Petchsamuthr Duanaaymukdahan
  - Verdejo won via unanimous decision.

== International broadcasting ==
Country	Broadcaster
Australia	Main Event
Chile	Vive Deportes
Hungary	Sport 1
Latin America	Golden
Indonesia	tvOne
Philippines	Solar All Access / GMA
United States	HBO PPV

Preceded by vs. Juan Manuel Márquez IV	Manny Pacquiao's bouts 24 November 2013	Succeeded by vs. Timothy Bradley II
Preceded by vs. Mike Alvarado	Brandon Ríos's bouts 24 November 2013	Succeeded by vs. Diego Gabriel Chaves
