= Manuel Pérez (boxer) =

American boxer

Personal information
- Nickname: Manos de La Muerte
- Born: May 28, 1984 (age 42) Honolulu, Hawaii, U.S.
- Height: 5 ft 8 in (173 cm)
- Weight: Light Welterweight; Lightweight; Super Featherweight; Featherweight

Boxing career
- Reach: 72 in (183 cm)
- Stance: Orthodox

Boxing record
- Total fights: 43
- Wins: 29
- Win by KO: 7
- Losses: 12
- Draws: 2

Manuel Pérez (born May 28, 1984) is an American professional boxer.

== Early life ==
Perez was born in Honolulu, where his father was stationed in the military, one of 11 children, but he has essentially been estranged from his parents since he was young after problems in the home led to Perez, then 9, and his siblings moving to Denver, Colorado, where his aunt and uncle — David and Hilda Medina — became his legal guardians. He dropped out of high school at an early age.

== Pro career ==
On October 17, 2009 Manuel Lost by 7th round T.K.O. to Undefeated Prospect Brandon Rios, after once before having pulled out a draw against Rios.

== Personal life ==
Perez is in a music video for the song "Yes My Lord" by Lounge Lo who is affiliated with the Wu-Tang Clan.
