= Andy Ruiz Jr. vs. Anthony Joshua II =

Boxing match

Clash On The Dunes
- Date: December 7, 2019
- Venue: Diriyah Arena, Diriyah, Saudi Arabia
- Title(s) on the line: WBA (Super), IBF, WBO, and IBO heavyweight titles

Tale of the tape
Boxer	Andy Ruiz Jr.	Anthony Joshua
Nickname	Destroyer	AJ
Hometown	Imperial, California, U.S.	London, England
Pre-fight record	33–1 (22 KO)	22–1 (21 KO)
Age	30 years, 2 months	30 years, 1 month
Height	6 ft 1 in (185 cm)	6 ft 7 in (201 cm)
Weight	284 lb (129 kg)	237 lb (108 kg)
Style	Orthodox	Orthodox
Recognition	WBA (Super), IBF, WBO and IBO; Heavyweight Champion; TBRB; No. 1 Ranked Heavyweight; The Ring; No. 3 Ranked Heavyweight	WBA/WBO; No. 3 Ranked Heavyweight; IBF/The Ring/TBRB; No. 4 Ranked Heavyweight; Former unified heavyweight champion

Result
- Joshua wins via 12-round unanimous decision (118–110, 118–110, 119–109)

Andy Ruiz Jr. vs Anthony Joshua II, billed as Clash On The Dunes, was a heavyweight professional boxing rematch between the American champion Andy Ruiz Jr. and British former champion Anthony Joshua, for the unified WBA (Super), IBF, WBO and IBO heavyweight world titles. The event took place on December 7, 2019, at the Diriyah Arena, Diriyah, Saudi Arabia. Joshua won the bout via unanimous decision. The bout between Ruiz and Joshua was refereed by Luis Pabon.

== Background ==
After losing by seventh-round technical knockout to Andy Ruiz Jr. on June 1, 2019, at Madison Square Garden in New York City in one of the biggest upsets in the history of boxing, Joshua stated in a post-fight interview that he and his team certainly expected to exercise the rematch clause with Ruiz. Four days after the fight took place, Joshua's promoter and group managing director of Matchroom Sport Eddie Hearn announced on social media platforms that Joshua's management team triggered the contractual rematch clause with Ruiz.

Saudi Arabian authorities reportedly paid £30 million ($41.1 million) to host the event in Saudi Arabia.

== The fight ==
Joshua dominated the fight, landing smart jabs and right hands throughout enroute to a wide unanimous decision victory with two judges scoring the bout 118–110 and the other 119–109.

== Aftermath ==
After his wide defeat Ruiz expressed interest in a third bout with Joshua, saying "I was chasing him too much. Who wants to see the trilogy fight?"

== International broadcasters ==
The fight was streamed live on Fight Sports MAX in MENA region (Saudi Arabia as host), DAZN in the United States and seven other countries, and televised live on PPV's Sky Sports Box Office in the United Kingdom and Ireland.

Country/Region	Broadcasters			
Country/Region	Free-to-air	Cable/Pay television	PPV	Stream
MENA: Saudi Arabia (host); Algeria; Bahrain; Egypt; Iraq; Jordan; Kuwait; Lebanon; Morocco; Oman; Qatar; Tunisia; United Arab Emirates	—N/a			Fight Sports MAX
United States	—N/a			DAZN
Austria	—N/a			DAZN
Brazil	—N/a			DAZN
Canada	—N/a			DAZN
Germany	—N/a			DAZN
Italy	—N/a			DAZN
Spain	—N/a			DAZN
Switzerland	—N/a			DAZN
Mexico	Azteca 7	—N/a		Azteca En Vivo
Latin America: Argentina; Bolivia; Chile; Colombia; Costa Rica; Dominican Republic; Ecuador; El Salvador; Guatemala; Honduras; Mexico; Nicaragua; Panama; Paraguay; Peru; Uruguay; Venezuela	—N/a	ESPN	—N/a	WatchESPN
United Kingdom	—N/a		Sky Sports Box Office	
Ireland	—N/a		Sky Sports Box Office	
Australia	—N/a		Main Event	—N/a
Balkan countries: Bosnia and Herzegovina; Montenegro; North Macedonia; Serbia	—N/a	Arena Sport		Orion TV (SRB only)
Balkan countries: Bosnia and Herzegovina; Montenegro; North Macedonia; Serbia	—N/a	Arena Sport		Max TV Go (exclude SRB)
Croatia	RTL	Arena Sport		Max TV Go (exclude SRB)
Croatia	RTL	—N/a		RTL Play
Baltic countries: Estonia; Latvia; Lithuania	—N/a	TVPlay Sports	—N/a	TVPlay Sports+
Belgium	—N/a	Eleven Sports	—N/a	Eleven Sports
Portugal	—N/a	Eleven Sports	—N/a	Eleven Sports
Taiwan	—N/a	Eleven Sports	—N/a	Eleven Sports
Luxembourg	—N/a	Eleven Sports	—N/a	Eleven Sports
Luxembourg	RTL 7		—N/a	RTL XL
Netherlands	RTL 7		—N/a	RTL XL
Brunei	—N/a		Astro Box Office	Astro Go
Malaysia	—N/a		Astro Box Office	Astro Go
Bulgaria	—N/a	Diema Sport	—N/a	Diema Play Extra
China	CCTV	—N/a		CNTV
Czech Republic	—N/a	Sport1	—N/a	Digi GO
Hungary	—N/a	Sport1	—N/a	Digi GO
Slovakia	—N/a	Sport1	—N/a	Digi GO
France	—N/a	RMC Sport	—N/a	RMC Sport
Indonesia	Mola TV		—N/a	Mola TV On Demand
Timor-Leste	Mola TV		—N/a	Mola TV On Demand
Israel	—N/a	Sport 1	—N/a	Sport 1
Japan	—N/a	Wowow	—N/a	Wowow
New Zealand	—N/a		Sky Arena	—N/a
Nordic countries: Denmark; Finland; Norway; Sweden	—N/a		Viaplay	
Mexico	Azteca 7	—N/a		Azteca En Vivo
Panama	RPC-TV	—N/a		Medcom Go
Philippines	Tap Sports		—N/a	Tap Go
Poland	TVP Sport	—N/a		TVP Stream
Romania	Pro TV		—N/a	Pro TV Plus
Romania	Pro TV		—N/a	Voyo
Russia	Channel One	—N/a		Channel One
South Africa	OpenView	—N/a		
Tajikistan	TV Varzish	—N/a		Mediabay
Uzbekistan	Sport	—N/a		Mediabay
Turkey	—N/a			SSport+
Ukraine	Inter	—N/a		Inter

== Fight card ==
Confirmed bouts:

Weight Class	Weight		vs.		Method	Round	Time	Notes
Heavyweight	+90 kg.	(United Kingdom) Anthony Joshua	def.	(United States) Andy Ruiz Jr. (c)	UD	12		^{Note 1}
Super middleweight	-76.2 kg.	(United States) Diego Pacheco	def.	(Tanzania) Selemani Saidi	KO	1 (4)	1:38
Heavyweight	+90 kg.	(Russia) Alexander Povetkin	vs.	(United States) Michael Hunter	SD	12
Heavyweight	+90 kg.	(United Kingdom) Dillian Whyte	def.	(Poland) Mariusz Wach	UD	10
Featherweight	-57 kg.	(United Kingdom) Hopey Price	def.	(Tanzania) Swedi Mohamed	TKO	3 (4)	2:22
Heavyweight	+90 kg.	(Croatia) Filip Hrgović (c)	def.	(United States) Éric Molina	KO	3 (12)	2:03	^{Note 2}
Heavyweight	+90 kg.	(Azerbaijan) Mahammadrasul Majidov	def.	(United Kingdom) Tom Little	TKO	2 (8)	1:49
Lightweight	-61.2 kg.	(Saudi Arabia) Zuhayr Al Qahtani	def.	(United Kingdom) Omar Dusary	UD	8
Lightweight	-61.2 kg.	(United Arab Emirates) Majid Al Naqbi	def.	(Georgia (country)) Ilia Beruashvili	TKO	3 (4)

^Note 1 For Unified WBA (Super), IBF, WBO, and IBO heavyweight titles

^Note 2 For WBC International heavyweight title

== Viewership ==
On Sky Sports Box Office, the fight reportedly broke the all-time UK pay-per-view (PPV) record, according to Eddie Hearn (who said he was told by Sky Sports). The Broadcasters' Audience Research Board (BARB) revealed that Sky Sports Box Office generated 1.284 million buys on fight night, and a further 291,000 buys over the following two weeks, totaling 1.575 million buys in the UK.

On DAZN, the fight was the most streamed event of 2019. It was watched live by approximately 1.8 million DAZN subscribers across nine markets, according to The Athletic boxing journalist Mike Coppinger, who also said the fight drew 200,000 new subscribers, with most from the United States.

== See also ==
- Anthony Joshua vs. Andy Ruiz Jr.

Preceded by First fight	Andy Ruiz Jr.' bouts 7 December 2019	Succeeded by vs. Chris Arreola
Preceded by First fight	Anthony Joshua's bouts 7 December 2019	Succeeded by vs. Kubrat Pulev
Awards
Previous: HBO leaves boxing	The Ring Event of the Year; 2019	Next: COVID-19 pandemic
