= XSPORT =

Ukrainian television sports channel

- Country: Ukraine
- Headquarters: Kyiv, Ukraine

Programming
- Picture format: 1080i (HDTV) (downscaled to 576i for SDTV)

Ownership
- Owner: Borys Kolesnikov

History
- Launched: January 22, 2012
- Closed: April 1, 2026

Links
- Website: www.xsport.ua

Availability

Terrestrial
- Zeonbud: MX-3 (27)

XSPORT was a Ukrainian multisport TV channel. It began broadcasting on January 22, 2012. Until June 10, 2013, it was a monosport television channel: "Hockey," which included the news online portal xsport.ua.

== History ==
On June 1, 2011, the National Council of Ukraine on Television and Radio Broadcasting issued a satellite broadcasting license to Totveld LLC. The logo and name of the channel according to the application were “Hockey”. On August 18, 2011, the channel won the National Council competition, and received a license for digital broadcasting.

At the end of May 2013, the owner of the channel decided to renew the license and change the channel name to “XSPORT”, as well as expand the broadcasting concept, showing other sporting events. On June 10, 2013, the channel was officially rebranded.

XSPORT positions itself as the only Ukrainian multisport channel promoting a healthy lifestyle. The mission of the channel is to draw attention to Ukrainian sports. Along with classic sports - hockey, boxing, martial arts, athletics, tennis, swimming, handball - the channel offers its viewers sports-themed films, extreme sports and sport fishing programs.

Due to factors such as the war in eastern Ukraine, the difficult economic situation in the country, and the instability of the exchange rate, the XSPORT channel decided on January 1, 2015, to suspend its own television broadcasting. First of all, such measures were associated with the inability to allocate a foreign currency budget for purchasing high-quality foreign content. Thus, the channel suspended broadcasting to optimize technical costs. The decision did not affect online broadcasting and the official site. The online resource continued to inform Ukrainian fans about sporting events in Ukraine and around the world.

On April 13, 2016, XSPORT resumed broadcasting on satellite and on the T2 digital network after a forced pause.

On November 9, 2017, the channel updated the logo and graphic design, which were then in yellow and blue colors.

On September 5, 2024, the National Radio and Television Council approved a temporary measure, during martial law, to air non-sport related programming. On March 26, 2026, the National Radio and Television Council revoked the license of Totveld LLC, resulting in the shutdown of XSPORT and XSPORT+ from April 1, due to Ukraine's unfavorable financial situation.

== Broadcasting ==
This channel was included in the digital pack DVB-T2, since it won the contest for getting into the nationwide multiplexes. It is also broadcast in packages of the largest cable operators in Ukraine: Volya, Triolan, Megogo, and others.

=== Satellite broadcasting ===
1.1. Satellite (SD format)

Orbital position 5° E

Satellite ASTRA 4A

Frequency 12245 MHz Vertical

Symbol rate 30,000 FEC 2/3 Scrambled Verimatrix (B)

== Programming ==
=== Broadcasts ===
- Hockey: World Cup 2019, Championship of Ukraine
- Boxing: Union Boxing Promotion, Sparta Boxing Promotions, KOTV Classics
- MMA: MMA Pro Ukraine, Mix Fight Promotions, Relocation Promotion, Mixed Martial Arts Federation of Ukraine
- Basketball: Ukrainian Championship, Eurobasket
- Handball: European Championship, 2016
- Cybersport

=== Programs ===
• XSPORT news

• "Yak ya stav khokeyistom"

• Fight life

• Lookout UHL

• Fight club

• XSPORT Moto

• XSPORT vlog

• "Ukrayina futbolʹna"

• Our Tenis

• Hour of Champions

• XSPORT studio
