= Bengal Bouts =

Boxing competitions

The Bengal Bouts is an annual charity boxing tournament hosted by the Men's Boxing Club at the University of Notre Dame airing on ESPN, with proceeds benefiting the Holy Cross Missions in Bangladesh. Begun in 1920 by legendary football coach Knute Rockne to condition football players in the offseason, the tournament later expanded entry to any member of the student body. Under the guidance and direction of Dominic "Nappy" Napolitano, the charity aspect of the event flourished while following the Men's Boxing Club mantra: "Strong Bodies Fight, that Weak Bodies May Be Nourished."

The training regimen requires novice boxers to receive instruction and conditioning in the fall, and returning fighters begin their mandatory workouts during an intensive 6-week period prior to the tournament. In current times, the Men's Boxing Club membership has swelled to include over 230 students, ranging from first-year undergraduate students to graduate and law school students, with participants fighting across 12 weight classes. In 2010, the Bengal Bouts helped generate a donation of $100,000 for the Holy Cross Missions in Bangladesh. This surpassed the $1,000,000 donated throughout the program's existence. Originally held in the Notre Dame Fieldhouse, the tournament is currently held in the Joyce Center (JACC) and airs on ESPN. In 2005, a sister program, named the Baraka Bouts, was instituted for women and benefits missions in East Africa.
