= Anthony Peterson =

American boxer

Personal information
- Nickname: Hazardous
- Born: Anthony Peterson; March 16, 1985 (age 41) Washington, D.C., U.S.
- Height: 5 ft 8 in (173 cm)
- Weight: Lightweight; Light welterweight

Boxing career
- Reach: 74 in (188 cm)
- Stance: Orthodox

Boxing record
- Total fights: 42
- Wins: 39
- Win by KO: 25
- Losses: 1
- Draws: 1
- No contests: 1

Anthony Peterson (born March 16, 1985) is a professional boxer. He is the younger brother of Lamont Peterson.

== Amateur career ==
Peterson had an outstanding amateur career, and was the 2003 National Golden Gloves Lightweight Champion. In 2004 he lost twice to Mexican American Vicente Escobedo at 132 lbs, which cost him his place in Athens. He and brother Lamont also won the Junior Olympic National Tournament in the amateurs.

== Professional career ==
Peterson turned pro in 2004 and has won 32 of his 33 professional fights, including 21 by way of KO.

On June 26, 2008, Peterson defeated Fernando Trejo by unanimous decision. Peterson was in command for the entire fight as he logged scores of 120–108, 120–108, and 119-109 from the judges in winning the NABF interim lightweight title.

On September 11, 2010, Peterson faced the undefeated Mexican American prospect Brandon Rios in a WBA title eliminator fight. Peterson lost the bout by disqualification in the 7th round due to repeated illegal low blows. Rios was leading on all three scorecards before the stoppage.

On December 10, 2011, Peterson defeated the Nigerian journeyman Daniel Attah on the Amir Khan vs. Lamont Peterson undercard at Walter E. Washington Convention Center, Washington, D.C., winning by unanimous decision.

On May 18, 2013, Peterson defeated Dominic Salcido on the Lucas Matthysse vs Lamont Peterson undercard at Boardwalk Hall, Atlantic City by winning by TKO on the 2nd round.

== Professional boxing record ==
40 fights	37 wins	1 loss
By knockout	24	0
By decision	13	0
By disqualification	0	1
Draws	1	
No contests	1	

No.	Result	Record	Opponent	Type	Round, time	Date	Location	Notes
42	Win	39–1–1 (1)	(Mexico) Saul Corral	UD	8 (8)	2022-05-28	(United States) Entertainment and Sports Arena, Washington, DC	
41	Win	38–1–1 (1)	(Mexico) Jairo Lopez	UD	6 (6)	2021-08-14	(United States) Georgia World Congress Center, Atlanta, GA	
40	Draw	37–1–1 (1)	(Dominican Republic) Argenis Mendez	SD	10 (10)	2019-03-24	(United States) MGM National Harbor, Oxon Hill	
39	NC	37–1 (1)	(Colombia) Luis Eduardo Florez	UD	10 (10)	2018-01-20	(United States) Barclays Center, Brooklyn	Win overturned for failing post fight test
38	Win	37–1	(Ghana) Samuel Kotey Neequaye	UD	10 (10)	2016-04-01	(United States) D.C. Armory, Washington	
37	Win	36–1	(United States) Mike Oliver	TKO	1 (10)	2015-10-17	(United States) EagleBank Arena, Fairfax	
36	Win	35–1	(Dominican Republic) Ramesis Gil	TKO	6 (10)	2015-07-11	(United States) Yuengling Center, Tampa	
35	Win	34–1	(Mexico) Edgar Riovalle	KO	1 (10)	2014-08-09	(United States) Barclays Center, Brooklyn	
34	Win	33–1	(Dominican Republic) Marcos Jimenez	UD	10 (10)	2014-03-21	(United States) Morongo Casino, Resort & Spa, Cabazon	
33	Win	32–1	(United States) Dominic Salcido	TKO	2 (10)	2013-05-18	(United States) Boardwalk Hall, Atlantic City	
32	Win	31–1	(Nigeria) Daniel Attah	UD	8 (8)	2011-12-10	(United States) Convention Center, Washington	
31	Loss	30–1	(United States) Brandon Ríos	DQ	7 (12)	2010-09-11	(United States) Pearl Concert Theater, Las Vegas	
30	Win	30–0	(Puerto Rico) Juan Ramon Cruz	TKO	3 (10)	2010-03-12	(United States) Gaylord Hotel, Grapevine	
29	Win	29–0	(Mexico) Luis Arceo	UD	10 (10)	2009-08-15	(United States) The Joint, Las Vegas	
28	Win	28–0	(Mexico) Javier Jáuregui	UD	10 (10)	2008-08-02	(United States) Pearl Concert Theater, Las Vegas	
27	Win	27–0	(Mexico) Fernando Trejo	UD	12 (12)	2008-06-26	(United States) The Orleans, Las Vegas	Won Interim NABF Lightweight title
26	Win	26–0	(Cuba) Jose Antonio Izquierdo	TKO	8 (10)	2008-01-04	(United States) Hard Rock Hotel and Casino, Biloxi	
25	Win	25–0	(Colombia) Oscar León	TKO	5 (8)	2007-11-17	(Turks and Caicos Islands) Casablanca Casino, Providenciales	
24	Win	24–0	(United States) Marteze Logan	UD	8 (8)	2007-09-01	(United States) Fitzgerald's Casino & Hotel, Tunica	
23	Win	23–0	(Dominican Republic) Luis Ernesto José	TKO	9 (12)	2007-05-25	(United States) D.C. Armory, Washington	Retained NABO Lightweight title
22	Win	22–0	(Mexico) Juan Humberto Garza	KO	4 (12)	2007-01-05	(United States) Beau Rivage, Biloxi	Retained NABO Lightweight title
21	Win	21–0	(Ghana) Alfred Kotey	UD	8 (8)	2006-11-18	(United States) Fitzgerald's Casino & Hotel, Tunica	
20	Win	20–0	(Panama) Armando Cordoba	UD	6 (6)	2006-09-01	(United States) Par-A-Dice Hotel and Casino, East Peoria	
19	Win	19–0	(Dominican Republic) Jose Vidal Soto	KO	2 (10)	2006-08-04	(United States) FedExForum, Memphis	
18	Win	18–0	(United States) Adan Hernandez	UD	12 (12)	2006-06-16	(United States) Pepsi Pavilion, Memphis	Won vacant NABO Lightweight title
17	Win	17–0	(United States) Jermaine White	RTD	3 (8)	2006-04-28	(United States) 4 Bears Casino & Lodge, New Town	
16	Win	16–0	(United States) Steve Verdin	RTD	3 (6)	2006-03-11	(United States) Fitzgerald's Casino & Hotel, Tunica	
15	Win	15–0	(Mexico) Manuel Bocanegra	RTD	2 (6)	2006-01-28	(United States) Fitzgerald's Casino & Hotel, Tunica	
14	Win	14–0	(United States) Roy Bohannon	TKO	4 (6)	2005-10-15	(United States) Isle of Capri Casino, Lula	
13	Win	13–0	(Mexico) Jorge Alberto Reyes	TKO	2 (6)	2005-09-02	(United States) Statehouse Convention Center, Little Rock	
12	Win	12–0	(United States) Johnny Walker	UD	6 (6)	2005-08-20	(United States) Isle of Capri Casino, Biloxi	
11	Win	11–0	(United States) Carlos Valdez	TKO	6 (8)	2005-07-26	(United States) W.C. Handy Pavilion, Memphis	
10	Win	10–0	(United States) Anthony Middlebrooks	KO	1 (6)	2005-06-18	(United States) FedExForum, Memphis	
9	Win	9–0	(United States) Wayne Fletcher	TKO	6 (6)	2005-06-11	(United States) Capital One Arena, Washington	
8	Win	8–0	(United States) Mario Lacey	KO	2 (6)	2005-05-22	(United States) Silver Star Casino, Choctaw	
7	Win	7–0	(Mexico) Martin Quiroz	TKO	5 (6)	2005-04-30	(United States) Isle Of Capri, Lula	
6	Win	6–0	(United States) Michael Moss	TKO	4 (4)	2005-04-23	(United States) Fitzgerald's Casino & Hotel, Tunica	
5	Win	5–0	(Mexico) Edgar Pedraza	UD	4 (4)	2005-04-09	(United States) Don Haskins Center, El Paso	
4	Win	4–0	(Puerto Rico) Jose Angel Roman	UD	4 (4)	2004-12-12	(United States) Convention Center, Washington	
3	Win	3–0	(United States) Bill Tipton	TKO	1 (4)	2004-11-05	(United States) Fitzgerald's Casino & Hotel, Tunica	
2	Win	2–0	(United States) Chris Burford	KO	2 (4)	2004-10-23	(United States) Isle of Capri Casino, Lula	
1	Win	1–0	(United States) Toris Smith	TKO	1 (4)	2004-09-25	(United States) FedExForum, Memphis	Professional debut

Sporting positions
Amateur boxing titles
Previous: Lorenzo Reynolds	U.S. Golden Gloves lightweight champion 2003	Next: Danny Williams
