= Mike Dallas Jr. =

American boxer (b. 1986)

Personal information
- Nickname: The Silent Assassin
- Nationality: American
- Born: Michael Dallas Jr. December 19, 1986 (age 39) Bakersfield, California, U.S.
- Height: 5 ft 10 in (178 cm)
- Weight: Light welterweight

Boxing career
- Reach: 72 in (183 cm)
- Stance: Orthodox

Boxing record
- Total fights: 29
- Wins: 23
- Win by KO: 11
- Losses: 4
- Draws: 2

Michael Dallas Jr. (born December 19, 1986) is an American professional boxer.

== Amateur career ==
Michael had an impressive amateur record of 115-12. He won a gold medal at the PAL International Junior Olympics in 2000. In 2002 he won a bronze medal at the US National Silver Gloves championships, losing to three-time Olympian Rau'shee Warren. That same year he was a runner-up at the PAL Junior championships (15-16 age range) at 112 lbs. During the 2004 US Western Olympic trials, he lost to Diego Magdaleno. At the 2006 National Golden Gloves he won a silver medal, losing to Brad Solomon. Mike also got a gold medal at the 2006 PAL championships at 64 kg, beating Karl Dargan and Raul Tovar. He went to the US 2008 Olympic trials at 64 kg, where he beat Brad Solomon but lost to Daniel O'Connor and Danny Garcia.

== Sparring Partners ==
Some of the boxers Michael has sparred with are 8-division world champion Manny Pacquiao and the undefeated Light Welterweight prospect José Benavidez Jr..

== Professional career ==
He made his professional debut in March 2008 in the Light Welterweight weight class against Alejandro Balladares and won all four rounds of the bout for a unanimous decision victory.

In July 2010, he made his debut on Showtime boxing against undefeated Lanard Lane. Despite predicting an easy knock-out, Lane found himself overwhelmed and all three judges scored the bout 78-74 in favor of Dallas.

=== Professional record ===
21 Wins (10 knockouts), 3 Losses, 2 Draw
Res.	Record	Opponent	Type	Rd., Time	Date	Location	Notes
Draw	21-3-2	(United States) Dusty Hernández-Harrison	SD	10(10)	2016-05-13	(Washington, D.C.) D.C. Armory, Washington, D.C.	Scorecards: 95-94, 94-94, 92-96.
Win	21-3-1	(Mexico) Odilon Rivera	KO	2 (6) (2:52)	2015-12-19	Billar El Perro Salado, Tijuana, Baja California, Mexico	
Win	20-3-1	(Mexico) Alejandro Alonso	KO	2 (6) (0:12)	2015-11-20	Billar El Perro Salado, Tijuana, Baja California, Mexico	
Loss	19-3-1	(Argentina) Lucas Matthysse	KO	1 (12) (2:26)	2013-01-26	(United States) Hard Rock Hotel and Casino, The Joint, Las Vegas, Nevada, USA	For interim WBC Light Welterweight title
Win	19-2-1	(Mexico) Javier Castro	KO	6 (12)	2012-06-22	(United States) Soboba Casino, San Jacinto, California, USA	Won WBO Latino Light Welterweight title
Win	18-2-1	(United States) Miguel Gonzalez	UD	10 (10)	2012-02-17	(United States) College Park Center, Arlington, Texas, USA	
Loss	17-2-1	(United States) Mauricio Herrera	MD	10 (10)	2011-06-24	Pechanga Resort & Casino, Temecula, California	
Loss	17-1-1	(United States) Josésito López	KO	7 (1:47)	2011-01-28	Pechanga Resort & Casino, Temecula, California	For the vacant NABF Light Welterweight title
Win	17-0-1	(United States) Devarise Crayton	KO	2 (2:41)	2010-10-30	The Palace, Auburn Hills, Michigan	
Win	16-0-1	(Costa Rica) Lenin Arroyo	TKO	2 (1:30)	2010-10-07	Tachi Palace Hotel & Casino, Lemoore, California	
Win	15-0-1	(United States) Lanard Lane	UD	8 (8)	2010-07-16	DeSoto Civic Center, Southaven, Mississippi	Lane was undefeated going in
Win	14-0-1	(United States) Daniel Gonzalez	TKO	2 (8)	2010-05-08	(United States) Home Depot Center, Carson, California, USA	
Win	13-0-1	(Mexico) Genaro Trazancos	TKO	1 (8)	2010-04-08	(United States) Tachi Palace Hotel & Casino, Lemoore, California, USA	
Win	12-0-1	(Mexico) Fabian Luque	TKO	1 (4)	2010-03-05	(United States) Pechanga Resort & Casino, Temecula, California, USA	

== Personal life ==
On June 12, 2008 Dallas, Jr. had a son named Mekai. He's a graduate of South High School in Bakersfield, where he played on both the basketball and football teams. His father Michael Dallas, Sr. fought professionally from 1991 to 1998.
