= Dusty Hernández-Harrison =

Puerto Rican-American boxer (born 1994)

Personal information
- Nickname: Dusty
- Nationality: American; Puerto Rican
- Born: Arturo Harrison-Hernández; May 21, 1994 (age 32) Southeast, Washington, D.C., U.S.
- Height: 6 ft 0 in (183 cm)
- Weight: Welterweight; Middleweight; Light heavyweight

Boxing career
- Reach: 74 in (188 cm)
- Stance: Orthodox

Boxing record
- Total fights: 38
- Wins: 37
- Win by KO: 23
- Losses: 0
- Draws: 1
- No contests: 0

Arturo "Dusty" Harrison Hernández (born May 21, 1994) is a Puerto Rican-American professional boxer. He is the former USBA and WBC Continental Americas welterweight champion.

In October 2013, Dusty was praised by Mike Tyson in an open letter. Tyson sent to USA Boxing in response to their accusation that his promotion was hindering the growth of USA Boxing's future Olympic team by signing young amateurs. Tyson used Dusty's career along with the career of Hall of Famer Wilfred Benítez as well as his own as examples of successful fighters who turned professional as teenagers. Tyson also mentioned Dusty on Twitter, calling him "a true inspiration for amateurs looking to turn pro."

Before his first fight in 2014, Dusty was featured in the Washington, D.C. lifestyle magazine, the Washingtonian. In the story, A Ring of His Own, Dusty's upbringing and career success are highlighted, as Dusty is described as "Washington’s best boxing prospect since Sugar Ray Leonard." Also in the article, undefeated two-division world champion Andre Ward said, "Dusty has the 'it' factor." On December 30, 2014, Dusty became the first boxer to sign with Jay-Z's Roc Nation Sports.

On December 2, 2015, Dusty signed a multi-year endorsement deal with sportswear company FILA. Dusty was supposed to have his first fight under the FILA brand on December 5, 2015, but after multiple opponents fell through including Steve Claggett (23–3–1, 16 KOs), the original opponent, his fight that was scheduled for HBO Latino was canceled at the last minute.

On January 27, 2016, Dusty signed a partnership deal with GEICO.

On June 15, 2018, Dusty was granted his release from Roc Nation Sports.

On December 20, 2018, Dusty signed with Lee Baxter Promotions.

== Amateur career ==
Dusty recalls watching old home movies of himself shadowboxing in a onesie when he was 10 months old. Dusty participated in his first boxing exhibition at the age of 6 at the historic Ritz Nightclub in Northwest, Washington, D.C. By the age of 8, Dusty was competing in sanctioned amateur matches and quickly amassed many championships. He won the 2010 National Silver Gloves Championships, three straight National Junior Golden Gloves Championships from 2007 to 2009 in which he won the Outstanding Boxer Award in 2008, and the Ringside World Championships, among others. Dusty finished his amateur career with a 167–30 record.

== Professional career ==
At the age of 17, Dusty chose to forgo his amateur status and made history in his professional debut on June 11, 2011, when he became the youngest licensed professional fighter in the United States. In his first professional bout at the DeSoto Civic Center in Southaven, Mississippi, Dusty faced Alphonso Alexander, a man more than twice his age. Dusty won by a 40–36 shutout on all three judges’ scorecards. In his next bout in July, Dusty earned a unanimous decision victory over veteran Trenton Titsworth.

On December 10, 2011, Dusty made his highly anticipated Washington, D.C. debut, fighting on the Amir Khan vs. Lamont Peterson undercard on an HBO World Championship Boxing broadcast. In his first hometown professional bout, Dusty scored three knockdowns and a first-round TKO over Terrell Davis.

Dusty was named the 2011 Rookie of the Year by boxing blog, Boxing Along The Beltway.

Dusty fought eight more times in 2012, including headlining cards in front of sellout crowds at the Walter E. Washington Convention Center in Washington, D.C. He was named 2012 Prospect of the Year by Stiff Jab. In 2013, Dusty won all eight of his fights and was named an ESPN Super 20 Prospect as well as 2013 Prospect of the Year by Boxing Along The Beltway. He was also dubbed by International Boxing Organization President Ed Levine as a fighter who had the makings of a future world champion.

On February 8, 2013, Dusty scored a third-round stoppage win over former National Golden Gloves Champion Kelly Wright in Wilmington, Delaware. Prior to the bout, Dusty sparred then undefeated junior welterweight world champion Danny García.

Two weeks later in Tunica, Mississippi, Dusty faced Aaron Anderson and won every round on the way to a six-round unanimous decision.

On April 12, 2013, Dusty fought for the first of three times at Dover Downs Hotel and Casino in Dover, Delaware. He won a unanimous decision against Puerto Rico's Jonathan Garcia, winning 60–54 on two of the judges' scorecards and 59–55 on the third.

On May 18, 2013, before a raucous hometown crowd of 3,000 fans that included Wale, Pierre Garçon, and Ty Lawson at the University of the District of Columbia, Dusty faced his toughest opponent to date, Eddie Soto (12–6), in a scheduled eight-round bout. Dusty dominated from the onset, dropping Soto with a right hand in the second round. He brought the fight to a halt in the fifth round with a right hand that ultimately led the referee to stop the fight after Soto fell three times from the punch. Dusty earned the "2013 Knockout of the Year" for the Soto fight and the "2013 Fighter of the Year" from Go Fight Live (GFL.tv).

A little over a month later on June 29, he defeated former WBO Africa Champion Ben Ankrah by unanimous decision on the Gennady Golovkin vs. Matthew Macklin undercard.

Dusty returned to Dover Downs on August 23 to fight Miami's Guillermo Valdes (12–4). In the second round, Dusty landed a double left-hook to the body and head that put his veteran opponent on the canvas. Dusty remained in control and the referee stopped the bout in the fourth round following a vicious barrage of punches along the ropes, bringing the crowd to its feet for their new "hometown" star.

Dusty won the WBC Youth Silver welterweight title on November 2, 2013, at The Theater at Madison Square Garden by defeating Josh "Pit Bull" Torres (12–2–1) via ten-round unanimous decision on the Gennady Golovkin vs. Curtis Stevens undercard. Dusty earned scores of 100–90, and 98–92 (x2). Calling it "the kind of fight that [he] has always wanted," Dusty added, "I have always dreamed of fighting at Madison Square Garden, and for it to be for the WBC Youth Silver World Championship makes it that much more special. I appreciate the opportunities being provided to me and will continue to work hard and do my part." His father Buddy Harrison recalled his son's hard work and dedication following the WBC Youth Silver Welterweight World Championship fight: "I told Dusty nearly ten years ago in this very arena that if he worked hard and did the right things he could one day win a world title at Madison Square Garden. Tonight we made that dream a reality as we continue on our mission."

Three weeks later on November 22, Dusty scored three knockdowns en route to a first-round knockout of Marlon Lewis at Dover Downs, ending Lewis' three-year unbeaten streak.

In his first live nationally televised bout on January 31, 2014, Dusty scored a decisive 78x74 victory on all three scorecards against Tim Witherspoon Jr. (10–3–1) on Friday Night Fights. HBO Boxing ringside judge Harold Lederman acknowledged Dusty on Twitter, saying, "Congratulations Dusty. Once again, you looked terrific. This was a terrific, hard-fought win. Loved it." Actor Mark Wahlberg tweeted out to his three-million followers that Dusty is "the truth."

Five weeks later on March 7, 2014, Dusty was once again on ESPN Friday Night Fights, earning a hard-fought unanimous decision victory over Michael Balasi (10–3, 7 KOs), a hard-hitting southpaw. Dusty came off the canvas in round two and floored Balasi twice en route to the unanimous decision victory.

On May 17, 2014, on his first trip to West Virginia, Dusty dominated the dangerous Roberto Valenzuela, owner of 56 KOs, en route to a fourth-round TKO.

On July 26, 2014, Dusty won a shutout unanimous decision over another hard-hitting southpaw in Wifredo Acuna on the Gennady Golovkin vs. Daniel Geale undercard at Madison Square Garden.

On November 1, 2014, Dusty made a successful hometown return. He knocked out Michael Clark (44–11–1) in the first round in front of 2,900 fans at DAR Constitution Hall. "When I fight in other places, I don’t get to do this. I don’t get to come out and take pictures with everybody. It’s not as fun for the fans when they have to go to New York or have to go to Dover or all these other places. I really enjoy doing this," said Hernández-Harrison about fighting at home once again.

On January 9, 2015, Dusty won the vacant WBC Continental Americas welterweight title by defeating Tommy Rainone (22–5–1) by scores of 100–90 twice and 99–91 live on Fox Sports 1 in the main event of Jay Z's Roc Nation Sports inaugural boxing event. Among the star-studded crowd of 4,253 at The Theater at Madison Square Garden were Jay Z, Rihanna, CC Sabathia, Jake Gyllenhaal, Rosie Perez, Carmelo Anthony, Victor Cruz, Andre Ward, Big Sean, Fabolous, Michael K. Williams, and Bryant Jennings. This was Dusty's third time fighting at the Mecca of Boxing, his first time headlining. His two previous appearances came on the undercards of Gennady Golovkin.

On April 17, 2015, at the Foxwoods Resort Casino, Dusty earned a shutout unanimous decision win over veteran Chris Gray.

On August 15, 2015, in Miami, Florida, Dusty dominated veteran Carlos Winston Velásquez from the opening bell. He landed a counter right hand that dropped Velásquez in the third round. He later forced Velásquez to retire on his stool after the fifth round due to an accumulation of brutal body shots.

A little over a month later on September 26 in Norfolk, Virginia, against veteran James Wayka, Dusty scored the fastest knockout of his career, as it only took him 78 seconds to dispatch his opposition.

In his 2016 debut on January 29 in Elk Grove Village, Illinois, Dusty defeated Angel Hernández via technical knockout as Hernández could not answer the bell for the third round due to an eye injury. Dusty earned his third consecutive stoppage victory.

On May 13 at the D.C. Armory, his first bout in his hometown since 2014, Dusty fought to a split draw against Mike Dallas Jr. (21–3–1). Both fighters thought they deserved the victory. "I thought I finished it great. I finished it way too strong with that knockdown [not to get the decision]. I feel I pulled it out with that late knockdown," Hernandez-Harrison said. "In my opinion, we won in his hometown convincingly," Dallas said.

Dusty spent five weeks leading up to the fight with Dallas in San Diego as a sparring partner for Canelo Álvarez ahead of his fight against Amir Khan as Dusty was brought in to mimic Khan's hand speed. He got more rounds with Álvarez than anyone else in camp, sparring some 50 rounds with the champ.

In Dusty's biggest fight, which took place on September 15, 2016, at the 2300 Arena in Philadelphia on CBS Sports Network, he won a unanimous decision over Thomas LaManna (21–1) by scores of 98–92 and 97–93 (x2) to win the vacant USBA welterweight title and earn himself a top 15 world ranking by the International Boxing Federation.

Dusty was supposed to make his long-awaited return on December 1, 2018, against James Winchester in the main event of the first boxing event at the brand new Entertainment and Sports Arena in his hometown of Washington, D.C. but had to pull out the week of the fight due to an injury. His return was then rescheduled to February 16, 2019, vs Ulises Jimenez at the Mountaineer Casino Ballroom in New Cumberland, West Virginia, but Jimenez failed to show up to the weigh-ins, a backup opponent was not be approved by the commission, and the fight was canceled.

Dusty made his highly anticipated return to the ring after nearly three years on March 30, 2019, against Bruce Rumbolz at the Grand Theater in New Albany, Indiana. Dusty knocked out the grizzled veteran 1:46 into the first round with a left to the body followed by a left hook to the head that sent Rumbolz to the canvas.

On April 20 at the Rosecroft Raceway in Fort Washington, Maryland, Dusty stopped Fred Jenkins Jr. in the fourth round. He used his jab effectively throughout the contest, which helped break Jenkins Jr.’s defense down. Dusty put the pressure on in the fourth round and landed a four-punch combo that dropped Jenkins Jr. to the canvas, who was counted out at the 2:17 mark.

On July 19 at the MGM National Harbor in Oxon Hill, Maryland, Dusty stopped Colombian fighter Juan De Angel in the seventh round. The fight served as the main undercard bout of a Top Rank on ESPN+ event headlined by Teófimo López. Dusty showed patience early in the fight, using his jab and superior hand speed to outbox De Angel. In the fifth round, Dusty started letting his hands go more, hurting De Angel with left hooks to the body and right hands upstairs. Late in the seventh, Dusty unleashed a three punch combination that dropped De Angel. He beat the referee's count, but spit his mouthpiece out, indicating he did not want to continue and the ref waived the fight off at the 2:30 mark.

On February 8, 2020, Dusty dropped Les Sherrington three times en route to a second-round knockout victory.

Dusty's next fight was supposed to be against former world champion Demetrius Andrade but the ten-round fight was canceled after Dusty tested positive for the novel coronavirus a week before the fight.

Dusty returned to the ring after a three-and-a-half-year layoff on September 15, 2023 to face Colombian veteran boxer Ronald Montes in Richmond, Virginia. After the fight culminated in a third round knockout victory, Dusty fought again in Richmond less than four months later against Mexico's Norberto Gonzalez. He stopped Gonzalez in the fourth round, making it six consecutive knockout wins for the unbeaten Harrison-Hernandez.

== Professional boxing record ==
38 fights	37 wins	0 losses
By knockout	23	0
By decision	14	0
Draws	1	

No.	Result	Record	Opponent	Type	Rounds	Date	Location	Notes
38	Win	37–0–1	(United States) Darin Austin	KO	(3) 8	2024-09-28	(United States) Patapsco Arena, Baltimore, Maryland	Time of knockout: 3:00.
37	Win	36–0–1	(Mexico) Norberto Gonzalez	TKO	(4) 8	2024-01-06	(United States) Acca Shriners Center, Richmond, Virginia	Time of knockout: 2:21.
36	Win	35–0–1	(Colombia) Ronald Montes	TKO	(3) 6	2023-09-15	(United States) John Marshall Ballrooms, Richmond, Virginia	Time of knockout: 1:45.
35	Win	34–0–1	(Australia) Les Sherrington	KO	(2) 8	2020-02-08	(United States) Tysons Playground, Vienna, Virginia	Time of knockout: 1:50.
34	Win	33–0–1	(Colombia) Juan De Angel	TKO	(7) 8	2019-07-19	(United States) MGM National Harbor, Oxon Hill, Maryland	Time of knockout: 2:34.
33	Win	32–0–1	(United States) Fred Jenkins Jr.	KO	(4) 8	2019-04-20	(United States) Rosecroft Raceway, Fort Washington, Maryland	Time of knockout: 2:17.
32	Win	31–0–1	(United States) Bruce Rumbolz	KO	1 (6)	2019-03-30	(United States) Grand Theater, New Albany, Indiana	Time of knockout: 1:46.
31	Win	30–0–1	(United States) Thomas LaManna	UD	10	2016-09-15	(United States) 2300 Arena, Philadelphia, Pennsylvania	Won vacant IBF-USBA welterweight title.
30	Draw	29–0–1	(United States) Mike Dallas Jr.	SD	10	2016-05-13	(United States) D.C. Armory, Washington, D.C.	
29	Win	29–0	(United States) Angel Hernandez	RTD	2 (8)	2016-01-29	(United States) The Belvedere, Elk Grove Village, Illinois	Time of knockout: 3:00.
28	Win	28–0	(United States) James Wayka	KO	1 (10)	2015-09-26	(United States) Masonic Temple, Norfolk, Virginia	Time of knockout: 1:18.
27	Win	27–0	(Nicaragua) Carlos Velasquez	TKO	5 (8)	2015-08-15	(United States) Mana Studios, Miami, Florida	Time of knockout: 2:59.
26	Win	26–0	(United States) Chris Gray	UD	8	2015-04-17	(United States) Foxwoods Resort Casino, Mashantucket, Connecticut	
25	Win	25–0	(United States) Tommy Rainone	UD	10	2015-01-09	(United States) Hulu Theater at Madison Square Garden, New York City, New York	Won vacant WBC Continental Americas welterweight title.
24	Win	24–0	(United States) Michael Clark	KO	1 (10)	2014-11-01	(United States) DAR Constitution Hall, Washington, D.C.	Time of knockout: 1:40.
23	Win	23–0	(Nicaragua) Wilfredo Acuna	UD	8	2014-07-26	(United States) Madison Square Garden, New York City, New York	
22	Win	22–0	(Mexico) Roberto Valenzuela	TKO	4 (8)	2014-05-17	(United States) Mountaineer Casino Resort, New Cumberland, West Virginia	Time of knockout: 2:12.
21	Win	21–0	(United States) Michael Balasi	UD	6	2014-03-07	(United States) Pala Casino Resort and Spa, Pala, California	
20	Win	20–0	(United States) Tim Witherspoon Jr.	UD	8	2014-01-31	(United States) Richard J. Codey Arena, West Orange, New Jersey	
19	Win	19–0	(United States) Marlon Lewis	KO	1 (8)	2013-11-22	(United States) Dover Downs Hotel and Casino, Dover, Delaware	Time of knockout: 2:20.
18	Win	18–0	(United States) Josh Torres	UD	10	2013-11-02	(United States) Hulu Theater at Madison Square Garden, New York City, New York	Won vacant WBC Youth Silver welterweight title.
17	Win	17–0	(United States) Guillermo Valdes	TKO	4 (6)	2013-08-23	(United States) Dover Downs Hotel and Casino, Dover, Delaware	Time of knockout: 0:45.
16	Win	16–0	(Ghana) Ben Ankrah	UD	6	2013-06-29	(United States) MGM Grand at Foxwoods Resort, Mashantucket, Connecticut	
15	Win	15–0	(Puerto Rico) Eddie Soto	KO	5 (8)	2013-05-18	(United States) University of the District of Columbia, Washington, D.C.	Time of knockout: 2:48.
14	Win	14–0	(Puerto Rico) Jonathan Garcia	UD	6	2013-04-12	(United States) Dover Downs Hotel and Casino, Dover, Delaware	
13	Win	13–0	(United States) Aaron Anderson	UD	6	2013-02-23	(United States) Resorts Casino and Hotel, Tunica, Mississippi	
12	Win	12–0	(United States) Kelly Wright	TKO	3 (6)	2013-02-08	(United States) Chase Center, Wilmington, Delaware	Time of knockout: 1:39.
11	Win	11–0	(United States) Darrell Jones	TKO	1 (6)	2012-12-08	(United States) Walter E. Washington Convention Center, Washington, D.C.	Time of knockout: 2:30.
10	Win	10–0	(United States) Nalo Leal	TKO	3 (8)	2012-11-03	(United States) Walter E. Washington Convention Center, Washington, D.C.	Time of knockout: 0:31.
9	Win	9–0	(United States) Shane Gierke	TKO	2 (6)	2012-09-29	(United States) Walter E. Washington Convention Center, Washington, D.C.	Time of knockout: 2:46.
8	Win	8–0	(United States) Marqs Jackson	UD	6	2012-08-25	(United States) Walter E. Washington Convention Center, Washington, D.C.	
7	Win	7–0	(United States) Reggie Nash	TKO	1 (6)	2012-07-14	(United States) Walter E. Washington Convention Center, Washington, D.C.	Time of knockout: 2:32.
6	Win	6–0	(Puerto Rico) Joey Ortega	TKO	2 (6)	2012-05-12	(United States) Walter E. Washington Convention Center, Washington, D.C.	Time of knockout: 2:59.
5	Win	5–0	(United States) Anthony Bowman	UD	4	2012-04-07	(United States) Landers Center, Southaven, Mississippi	
4	Win	4–0	(United States) Booker Mullins	TKO	1 (4)	2012-03-10	(United States) Walter E. Washington Convention Center, Washington, D.C.	Time of knockout: 2:08.
3	Win	3–0	(United States) Terrell Davis	TKO	1 (4)	2011-12-10	(United States) Walter E. Washington Convention Center, Washington, D.C.	Time of knockout: 2:46.
2	Win	2–0	(United States) Trenton Titsworth	UD	4	2011-07-30	(United States) Fitzgerald's Casino and Hotel, Tunica, Mississippi	
1	Win	1–0	(United States) Alphonso Alexander	UD	4	2011-06-11	(United States) DeSoto Civic Center, Southaven, Mississippi	
