= Lamont Peterson =

American boxer (born 1984)

Personal information
- Nickname: Havoc
- Born: January 24, 1984 (age 42) Washington, D.C., U.S.
- Height: 5 ft 9 in (175 cm)
- Weight: Light welterweight; Welterweight

Boxing career
- Reach: 72 in (183 cm)
- Stance: Orthodox

Boxing record
- Total fights: 42
- Wins: 35
- Win by KO: 17
- Losses: 6
- Draws: 1

Lamont Peterson (born January 24, 1984) is an American former professional boxer who competed from 2004 to 2019. He held world championships in two weight classes, including the IBF light welterweight title between 2011 and 2015, and the WBA (Regular) welterweight title in 2017.

== Early life ==
Lamont Peterson and his younger brother Anthony Peterson have been regularly featured on ESPN boxing telecasts and their story has been frequently discussed on the show. The Petersons were left without parents at an early age, with their father in prison and their mother suffering personal issues. The brothers were reportedly homeless on the streets of Washington, D.C., for several years. While homeless at age 10, they were noticed by Barry Hunter, a boxing coach. Over time, Hunter developed their boxing skills while mentoring them and both brothers morphed into amateur boxing stars. They have said that their toughest bout were against a pair of brothers from Virginia, Ordano and Orazio Robinson.

== Amateur career ==
- 2001 National Golden Gloves Lightweight Champion.

He became 141 lbs US champion in 2003. He holds wins over Rock Allen in 2003, who beat him twice 2004 in the Olympic box-offs, Mike Alvarado and Andre Dirrell, as well as 2003 amateur world champion Willy Blain (in 2003).

== Professional career ==
=== Light welterweight ===
==== Early years ====
Lamont Peterson made his professional debut on September 25, 2004, on the undercard of Glenn Johnson vs. Roy Jones Jr. at the FedEx Forum in Memphis, Tennessee. Peterson's brother Anthony also made his debut on the same card, winning via 1st-round knockout. Peterson fought 18 year old Nicholas Dean, who at the time had only one fight on his record, which was a loss. Peterson stopped Dean after just 22 seconds into his debut. Peterson went on to fight a further 3 times in 2004, remaining undefeated. In 2005, Peterson won all his 11 bouts, with 5 coming via stoppage. At this time, Peterson had racked up 15 wins, with 7 inside the distance and no losses. On February 17, 2006, Peterson saw himself fighting for the Vacant WBC United States light welterweight title at the FedEx Forum against Jose Leo Moreno (12–1, 10 KOs). The fight took place on a Friday night live on ESPN2. Peterson was taken the 10 round distance for a second time winning the vacant title. Two judges scored the fight 100-90, whilst the third had it 99-91, all in favour of Peterson. He never made a defence of the title.

On April 28, Peterson took on his biggest challenge, a fight against Mario Ramos (16-2-1, 3 KOs). Ramos was coming off a wide 12 round unanimous decision loss against top contender Demetrius Hopkins a month earlier. Peterson won the fight via unanimous decision after 10 rounds. Two judges scored the fight clear for Peterson, whilst the third judge awarded Ramos with three rounds. After four wins, Peterson received another title opportunity, this time the vacant WBO NABO super lightweight title against Frankie Santos. Peterson dominated the opening six rounds of the fight. Santos failed to get up off his stool for the start of round 7, retiring on his stool, giving Peterson the win and the title. In November 2007, Peterson fought his first fight outside of the United States, knocking out Ecuadorian boxer Humberto Toledo (31-4-2, 18 KOs) in round 1. The fight took place at the Casablanca Casino in Providenciales International Airport on the Turks And Caicos Islands. Pearson dropped Toledo to a quick knee with combinations to the head and body. Toledo took the mandatory eight-count. He would be knocked down again, this time with a left to the body. An unsteady Toledo made it to his feet as the referee approached the ten count. The fight was stopped. On November 1, 2008, Peterson challenged fringe contender Lanardo Tyner (19–1, 11 KOs) for the Interim NABF title. The fight took place at the Mandalay Bay Hotel & Casino In Paradise, Nevada. Peterson was docked a point for repeated low blows in round 4, but did enough to secure a wide decision win. The three judges' scored the fight 99-90, 99-87 and 98-91 in favour of Peterson.

==== Peterson vs. Bradley ====
In April 2009, Peterson defeated French boxer Willy Blain for the vacant WBO Interim title, making him mandatory to full titleholder and The Ring No. 1 light welterweight Timothy Bradley (24–0, 11 KOs). The fight took place at Agua Caliente Casino in Rancho Mirage, California, on December 12, 2009. Bradley dropped Peterson with an overhand right in the third round. However, Peterson got up and landed hard left hooks to the body. Peterson cut under the left eye from an accidental headbutt in round 12. After 12 rounds, the judges scored the fight 120-107, 119-108 and 118-110 in favour of Bradley, retaining his title and handing Peterson his first professional loss. The bout was televised as a main event on Showtime Championship Boxing. After the bout, Peterson told Showtime, "My game plan was to win the first round, but in the middle of the first round, I got hit real hard by a couple of right hands. It really bothered me. I lost the round, I fell behind, I got reckless. I couldn't make it up. I gave it all I had. He's a great champion."

Following his first loss, Peterson returned to the ring on April 10, 2010, at the Hard Rock Hotel and Casino in Paradise, Nevada, against 32 year old boxer Damian Fuller at 143 pound catchweight. Peterson won the fight via 7th-round TKO.

==== Peterson vs. Ortiz ====
On October 12, 2010, it was reported by LA Times that Peterson would fight on the undercard of Amir Khan vs. Marcos Maidana, against The Ring No. 9 light welterweight Victor Ortiz (28-2-1, 22 KOs) on December 11 at the Mandalay Bay Resort & Casino in Las Vegas. Ortiz started the fight strong by knocking Peterson down twice in the third round, but many felt Peterson took the middle and late rounds of the fight, doing enough to earn the decision. The fight was officially declared a majority draw. One judge scored the fight 95-93 in favour of Peterson, however the remaining judges scored the fight 94-94. In the post-fight, Ortiz said, "I thought I pulled it off. He didn't even hit that hard." When the fight was over, Ortiz jumped on the top ropes and began celebrating. Ortiz landed 96 of 457 punches thrown (21%), while Peterson was more accurate, landing a total of 111 of 331 shots (33%). Many observers believed Ortiz had won the fight. ESPN's Dan Rafael and HBO's unofficial scorer, scored the bout 97-91 for Ortiz.

==== Peterson vs. Khan ====
In September 2011, it was announced that Amir Khan would defend his WBA and IBF light-welterweight titles in Washington, D.C., on 10 December against Peterson at the Convention Center. In front of a near sell out crowd of 8,647, Peterson defeated Khan for the by split decision in a very controversial affair. Khan was docked 2 points in rounds 7 and 12 by the referee Joe Cooper for pushing, although illegal pushing is not usually met with such harsh consequences, the HBO team picked up on this. Peterson was dropped to the canvas twice, although the first time was counted as a slip instead of a legitimate knockdown. Both fighters boxed well and two judges scored it 113–112 to Peterson, with the other 115–110 to Khan (originally announced as 114–111 to Khan). Some observers felt it was a hometown robbery as Peterson is from Washington DC, while many felt that Khan wasn't treated fairly. Khan landed 238 punches out of 757 thrown (31%) and Peterson connected on 226 of 573 blows (39%). ( ESPN's Dan Rafael score the fight 114-111 in favour of Khan. HBO's unofficial scorer, Harold Lederman, scored it 113-112, also for Khan. After the fight Khan said, "It was like I was against two people, the referee and Lamont himself. I was the cleaner fighter; he was so wild. The referee wasn't giving me a chance. I heard the referee give me a warning [for pushing], but there was nothing I could do. He kept coming in with his head. There hasn't been [HBO] boxing in D.C. for the last [18] years because this is what happens." Khan earned a base purse of $1.1 million, while Peterson earned a career-high $650,000 purse.

A rematch was due to take place on 19 May. It was later found that Peterson had tested positive for PEDs and was stripped of the WBA title. He admitted to the use of steroids shortly after. Khan was then reinstated as the WBA champion.

==== Peterson vs. Holt ====
On December 20, 2012, it was reported that Peterson would fight Timothy Bradley (29–0, 12 KO's) in a rematch, which would take place on March 30, 2013. The issue with the fight being made was due to Peterson's title defence against Kendall Holt which was due to take place in early 2013. In December, Holt's promoter Gary Shaw won the purse bid with an off offer of $50,000. This meant Peterson, as the titleholder would earn $37,500, while Holt would earn $12,500. Shaw told ESPN, although he won the bid, he still worked closely with Peterson's manager Barry Hunter to organise the fight. On January 2, 2013, it was announced that Peterson would mark his first fight in 14 months defending his IBF title at the Armory in Washington, D.C., against Holt (28–5, 16 KOs) on February 22. Hunter stated that both fighters would earn more than their announced purses for the fight. The fight aired live on ESPN Friday Night Fights.

Peterson overcame a sluggish start, floored Holt two times, and forced a stoppage in round 8 to successfully defend his IBF title in front of his home crowd. Peterson sealed the win in the eighth when a barrage with Holt against the ropes caused referee Tony Weeks to step in and end it. Holt opened the fourth round looking to step up the pace, but seemed to tire by the midway point and the champion took advantage. A right hand to the side of the head sent Holt down to all fours in the final minute of the round. He remained down on a knee before getting to his feet at the count of eight. Peterson controlled the action from then on. A series of punches from Peterson late in round 6 caused Holt to take a knee for another eight count. Holt admitted he struggled to make the 140 pound limit and considered a move to welterweight.

==== Peterson vs. Matthysse ====
On March 23, 2013 Golden Boy Promotions announced that interim WBC light welterweight champion Lucas Matthysse (33–2, 31 KOs) would meet Peterson at Boardwalk Hall in Atlantic City on May 18, in the main event, live on Showtime. Matthysse was waiting to fight full WBC titleholder Danny Garcia, who at the time, had a defence scheduled against Zab Judah. Richard Schaefer, of Golden Boy, had hoped the winner of the two fights would eventually meet in the fall 2013. Matthysse, whose two losses came in his two opponents' hometowns, did not want the fight to take place in Washington, D.C., home of Peterson. Matthysse initially wanted the fight to take place in Southern California, however, a deal was reached for the fight to take place in New Jersey. The fight was fought at a 141-pound catch weight which meant no titles were at stake. Matthysse was expected to arrive in New York on May 14, but instead arrived two days later due to an alleged robbery in which his passport was "badly defaced and rendered unusable." Reports indicated it was someone inside of Matthysse's camp hoping to prevent the Argentinian from being able to make the fight. Matthysse and promoters were able to shorten the normally lengthy process of obtaining a new passport to a few days.

A crowd of 4,215 was announced at the Hall, which saw Peterson lose via TKO in round 3. Peterson was knocked down once in round 2 and two more times in round 3. This was counted as successful title defence by Matthysse by the WBC although the title was not on the line for Peterson for being over the light welterweight limit. Matthysse would have been stripped had he lost the fight. In the post fight, Peterson said, "I feel OK. I'm upset that I lost, but I feel good. He hit me with a good shot and I guess just finished the job. I felt as thought I could have fought through it, but the referee did the right thing." Peterson boxed effectively in the opening round and looked to keep Matthysse out of range. In the second round, however, the Argentinian had closed the distance and was able to land. A left hook to the forehead sent Peterson off balance and down in the final minute of the second round. In the third round, a left hook sent Peterson down hard in the center of the ring. He stumbled and struggled to get to his feet, but was able to beat the count and was allowed to continue. Matthysse came forward and threw a combination and again Peterson stumbled backward and down. At that, veteran referee Steve Smoger waved an end to the bout, giving Peterson his first stoppage defeat. For the fight, Matthysse earned a career-high $700,000 purse. Peterson earned $800,000, also a career-high.

==== Peterson vs. Jean ====
On November 19, 2013, Golden Boy announced a deal was in place for Peterson to make a defence in his home town against undefeated contender Dierry Jean (25–0, 17 KOs). On December 16, an official press release confirmed the fight would take place at the D.C. Armory on January 25, 2014. In a statement, Peterson said, "This is the perfect way for me to kick off 2014, with a great fight against a tough opponent in my hometown. Fights like these bring out the best in me and I'm going to give my fans a performance to remember." A fight between Jermell Charlo and Gabriel Rosado was announced as a co-feature, with Peteron-Jean scheduled to headline the Showtime card.

In front of a hometown of 5,668, Peterson won the fight by unanimous decision, handing Jean his first career loss, with the judges scores of 118-111, 116-112 and 115-113. Jean started the fight off more patient than Peterson. Midway through the fight Peterson became the aggressor and a few rounds later, started to outwork and outland Jean using his speed and combinations. After the fight, speaking about the Matthysse loss, Peterson said, "Everybody try to make a big deal out of one loss. But if the best fight the best, sometimes it's going to be a knockout. I always prepare myself to win, but I know you can lose. My whole life it's never been easy, so why would it be easy now?" According to CompuBox stats, Peterson landed 230 of 622 punches thrown (37%), while Jean landed on 123 of his 556 total thrown (22%). Former world champion Paulie Malignaggi, who was working as an analyst for Showtime praised Peterson, stating he still has a huge claim at light welterweight.

==== Peterson vs. García ====
On January 14, 2015, NBC announced a partnership with Premier Boxing Champions to air premium fights on network television. It was announced that Danny García and Lamont Peterson would fight April 11, 2015, on NBC primetime. The fight was at the Barclays Center in Brooklyn, New York. The highly anticipated bout between García and Peterson took place at a 143-pound catch weight and was a non-title bout. Both fighters had something to prove as García was coming off an extremely tough fight with Mauricio Herrera and Peterson was still reeling from a knockout loss to Lucas Matthysse in 2013. The fight was held at a catchweight of 143 pounds, with neither boxers titles at stake.

A crowd of 12,300 turned up at the Barclays Center. In the early rounds Peterson was very defensive and attempted to frustrate García with his awkward style. García was the busier fighter the first four or five rounds throwing and landing more punches although having trouble landing clean punches on Peterson. Peterson's size and athleticism allowed him to stay in the fight even in the face of waves of serious García body blows. Peterson looked strong going into rounds 10, 11, 12. García maintained a steady attack in the last three rounds of the fight while Peterson began coming forward and throwing everything he had. Despite a very strong showing by Peterson, García was awarded a majority decision by scores of 114–114, 115–113, 115–113. For the fight, Garcia earned $1.5 million compared to Peterson, who earned a $1.2 million purse. CompuBox stats showed that both fighters stayed busy, with Garcia landing 173 of 589 punches (29%), with Peterson more accurate, landing 170 of his 494 thrown (34%).

=== Welterweight ===
==== Peterson vs. Diaz ====
On October 17, 2015, Peterson fought at the EagleBank Arena in Fairfax, Virginia, against undefeated welterweight prospect and 2008 Olympic gold medalist Félix Díaz (17–0, 8 KOs) in a scheduled 12 round fight. Peterson won a close 12 round majority decision over Diaz. The final judges’ scores were 114-114, 117-111 and 116-112. Peterson was effective with his body punching in most round, but gave away a lot of the rounds to Diaz by not throwing enough punches, and getting hit on the inside. Some observers had Diaz the winner, with ESPN scoring it 116-112 for Diaz. Peterson voiced his opinion in believing he won the fight in the post fight interview, "I started out strong and faded in the middle rounds because I started to cramp, and it lasted for the rest of the fight, but I knew I had done enough to win the fight."

==== Peterson vs. Avanesyan ====
In December 2016, early reports suggested there was a fight in the works, for David Avanesyan to defend the interim championship against Peterson. A venue in the United States was being discussed for February 2017. On January 11, 2017, a spokesperson for Avanesyan announced the fight would take place on February 18 at the Cintas Center in Cincinnati, Ohio, on the undercard of Adrien Broner vs. Adrian Granados on Showtime. Peterson became a two-weight division champion after defeating Avanesyan via a 12-round unanimous decision. The fight was described as 'highly competitive and entertaining' by ESPN. Two judges scored it 116-112 and the third had it closer at 115-113, all in favor of Peterson. Peterson earned a purse of $250,000 whilst Avanesyan had a purse of $75,000 and winning the fight put Peterson in position to fight the winner of Keith Thurman and Danny Garcia.

==== Peterson vs. Spence Jr. ====
On October 3, 2017, Peterson wrote to the WBA, officially vacating the WBA 'Regular' title. This was believed to be done as part of Peterson challenging IBF welterweight champion Errol Spence Jr. (22–0, 19 KOs) later in the year. On October 13, Boxing Scene reported that terms would be finalised in a week which would see Spence make his first defence on January 13, 2018, against Peterson. Spence, was last in action when he dethroned British boxer Kell Brook in May 2017. On November 5, it was reported the fight was confirmed to take place at the Barclays Center in Brooklyn on January 20, 2018.

On fight night, in front of 12,107, Spence broke Peterson down mentally and physically eventually forcing Peterson's trainer Barry Hunter to stop the fight a second into round 8. Peterson was dropped in round 5 from a left hand by Spence. Peterson beat the count and looked unsteady, surviving the round. Peterson took a lot of punishment, but managed to fire back some offence of his own before the round ended. Peterson's face looked swollen and his eyes were puffy from Spence's hard shots. Spence also worked the body from the opening bell. After round 6, Peterson knew he was behind on the scorecards and indicated to his trainer, who said he would give him a few more rounds. In the post-fight interviews, Spence said, "I want to thank Lamont. A lot guys turned down the fight, and he took like a real warrior, and I commend him for that. My coach [Derrick James] came with a great game plan, and I just followed through with it. Keep my range, keep my composure." Spence admitted he would need to work on his defence a little. When interviewer Jim Gray asked Hunter about the stoppage, he replied, "It was really hard [to stop the fight], but if you know Lamont, you know he was not going to give up. So I had to stop it. At the end of the day this is my son right here. And there's nothing more valuable than his well being. If it comes to him or winning, I pick him. I care about him." At the time of stoppage, all three judges had their scorecards at 70-62 for Spence.

According to CompuBox stats, Spence landed 161 of 526 punches thrown (31%), and Peterson landed only 45 of his 158 thrown (28%). For the fight, Spence had an official purse of $1.2 million and Peterson's purse was $600,000.

==== Peterson vs. Lipinets ====
At a press conference in Los Angeles on November 13, 2018, PBC announced that Peterson would fight former super lightweight world champion Sergey Lipinets (14-1, 10 KOs) on FS1, as part of their deal with FOX. After losing the IBF title to Mikey Garcia in March 2018, he returned and outpointed Erick Bone in August 2018. The card was promoted by TGB Promotions and HeadBangers Promotions. The card was made official in February 2019, to take place at MGM National Harbor in Maryland on March 24, a Sunday special. It also aired on FOX Deportes. The fight was billed as a 'classic 50-50 matchup' by Tom Brown. Peterson had not fought since his one-sided loss to Spence in January 2018. He told reporters that he needed his body to rest and recover after a long career.

The card drew an attendance of 2,052 fans. Lipinets broke Peterson down and stopped him in round 10 of their scheduled 12-round bout. Peterson was getting the better of the action in the opening rounds, likely taking the lead on the cards. Lipinets hurt Peterson round 8 with a big right hand. Peterson only just made it to the end of the round. Peterson wasn't able to recover in between rounds. In the tenth round, Lipinets continued to hurt Peterson, caught him with a right hand, sending him back towards the ropes before dropping him. Peterson's trainer Barry Hunter threw in the towel calling referee Harvey Dock to stop the fight. The official time of the stoppage was at 2:59. At the time of stoppage, two of the judges had Lipinets ahead 86-85 & 87-84 and the remaining had a score of 86-85 for Peterson. Both boxers threw career-high punches. CompuBox showed Lipinets landing 264 of his 986 punches thrown (27%), whilst Peterson landed 303 of 972 thrown (31%). The card averaged 290,000 viewers on FOX's platforms, with the main event averaging 230,000 viewers. It was not expected to do high number because it went head-to-head with NCAA’s March Madness college basketball tournament.

After the fight Peterson announced his retirement. On the PA system, he told the crowd, "It's been a long career but today is the day. I love everyone here and I'm always going to support this area, but I'm sure it's time for me to hang it up. I couldn't go out in a better way here at home. This will be the last time you see me in the ring." Peterson had now suffered back-to-back stoppage defeats.

=== Return at light welterweight ===
==== Peterson vs. Ogundo ====
On January 3, 2023 Peterson was announced for the non-televised undercard, which would precede the Showtime PPV headlined by Gervonta Davis vs. Héctor Luis García on January 7 at the Capital One Arena in Washington, D.C. He was scheduled to take on 40 year old journeyman Michael Ogundo (16-16, 13 KOs) in a six-round fight at super lightweight. Both weighed slightly over the limit with Peterson weighing 141.6 pounds and Ogundo weighed 140.2 pounds. This was Peterson's third fight in 5 years. Ogundo dropped Peterson in the round 4 before his corner threw in the towel. Peterson beat the count, but had taken a lot of punishment leading to the knockdown. The time of the stoppage was 2:05 of the round.

== Professional boxing record ==
42 fights	35 wins	6 losses
By knockout	17	4
By decision	18	2
Draws	1	

No.	Result	Record	Opponent	Type	Round, time	Date	Location	Notes
42	Loss	35–6–1	Michael Ogundo	TKO	4 (6),	Jan 7, 2023	Capital One Arena, Washington, D.C., U.S.	
41	Loss	35–5–1	Sergey Lipinets	TKO	10 (12), 2:59	Mar 24, 2019	MGM National Harbor, Oxon Hill, Maryland, U.S.	
40	Loss	35–4–1	Errol Spence Jr.	RTD	7 (12), 3:00	Jan 20, 2018	Barclays Center, New York City, New York, U.S.	For IBF welterweight title
39	Win	35–3–1	David Avanesyan	UD	12	Feb 18, 2017	Cintas Center, Cincinnati, Ohio, U.S.	Won WBA (Regular) welterweight title
38	Win	34–3–1	Félix Díaz	MD	12	Oct 17, 2015	EagleBank Arena, Fairfax, Virginia, U.S.	
37	Loss	33–3–1	Danny García	MD	12	Apr 11, 2015	Barclays Center, New York City, New York, U.S.	
36	Win	33–2–1	Edgar Santana	TKO	10 (12), 2:48	Aug 9, 2014	Barclays Center, New York City, New York, U.S.	Retained IBF light welterweight title
35	Win	32–2–1	Dierry Jean	UD	12	Jan 25, 2014	D.C. Armory, Washington, D.C., U.S.	Retained IBF light welterweight title
34	Loss	31–2–1	Lucas Matthysse	TKO	3 (12), 2:14	May 18, 2013	Boardwalk Hall, Atlantic City, New Jersey, U.S.	
33	Win	31–1–1	Kendall Holt	TKO	8 (12), 1:42	Feb 22, 2013	D.C. Armory, Washington, D.C., U.S.	Retained IBF light welterweight title
32	Win	30–1–1	Amir Khan	SD	12	Dec 10, 2011	Boardwalk Hall, Atlantic City	Won WBA (Super) and IBF light welterweight titles; Peterson stripped of WBA (Super) title after failed drug test
31	Win	29–1–1	Victor Cayo	KO	12 (12), 2:46	Jul 29, 2011	Cosmopolitan of Las Vegas, Paradise, Nevada, U.S.	
30	Draw	28–1–1	Victor Ortiz	MD	10	Dec 11, 2010	Mandalay Bay Events Center, Paradise, Nevada, U.S.	
29	Win	28–1	Damian Fuller	TKO	7 (10), 1:10	Apr 10, 2010	The Joint, Paradise, Nevada, U.S.	
28	Loss	27–1	Timothy Bradley	UD	12	Dec 12, 2009	Agua Caliente Casino, Rancho Mirage, California, U.S.	For WBO light welterweight title
27	Win	27–0	Willy Blain	TKO	7 (12), 1:47	Apr 25, 2009	Coliseo Rubén Rodríguez, Bayamón, Puerto Rico	Won vacant WBO interim light welterweight title
26	Win	26–0	Lanardo Tyner	UD	10	Nov 1, 2008	Mandalay Bay Events Center, Paradise, Nevada, U.S.	Won vacant NABF interim light welterweight title
25	Win	25–0	Rogelio Castañeda Jr.	TKO	9 (10), 2:50	Jul 5, 2008	Planet Hollywood Resort & Casino, Paradise, Nevada, U.S.	
24	Win	24–0	Antonio Mesquita	UD	10	Jan 4, 2008	Hard Rock Hotel and Casino, Biloxi, Mississippi, U.S.	
23	Win	23–0	Humberto Toledo	KO	1 (8), 2:28	Nov 17, 2007	Casablanca Casino, Providenciales, Turks and Caicos Islands	
22	Win	22–0	Frankie Santos	RTD	6 (12), 3:00	Sep 7, 2007	Hard Rock Hotel & Casino, Biloxi, Mississippi, U.S.	Won vacant WBO–NABO light welterweight title
21	Win	21–0	John Brown	TKO	8 (10), 0:28	May 25, 2007	D.C. Armory, Washington, D.C., U.S.	
20	Win	20–0	Juaquin Gallardo	UD	8	Jan 5, 2007	Beau Rivage, Biloxi, Mississippi, U.S.	
19	Win	19–0	Marteze Logan	UD	8	Nov 18, 2006	Fitzgeralds Casino and Hotel, Tunica Resorts, Mississippi, U.S.	
18	Win	18–0	Omar Bernal	TKO	6 (8), 1:19	Sep 1, 2006	Par-A-Dice Hotel and Casino, East Peoria, Illinois, U.S.	
17	Win	17–0	Mario Ramos	UD	10	Apr 28, 2006	4 Bears Casino & Lodge, New Town, North Dakota, U.S.	
16	Win	16–0	Jose Leo Moreno	UD	10	Feb 17, 2006	FedExForum, Memphis, Tennessee, U.S.	Won vacant WBC–USBNC light welterweight title
15	Win	15–0	Johnny Walker	TKO	3 (6)	Dec 10, 2005	Fitzgeralds Casino and Hotel, Tunica Resorts, Mississippi, U.S.	
14	Win	14–0	Robert Frankel	UD	8	Sep 2, 2005	Statehouse Convention Center, Little Rock, Arkansas, U.S.	
13	Win	13–0	Meacher Major	UD	6	Aug 20, 2005	Isle of Capri Casino, Biloxi, Mississippi, U.S.	
12	Win	12–0	Miguel Angel Torresillas	UD	10	Jul 19, 2005	Isle of Capri Casino, Lula, Mississippi, U.S.	
11	Win	11–0	John Frazier	TKO	1 (6)	Jun 18, 2005	FedExForum, Memphis, Tennessee, U.S.	
10	Win	10–0	Mikel Williams	UD	6	May 22, 2005	Silver Star Hotel & Casino, Choctaw, Mississippi, U.S.	
9	Win	9–0	Orlando Jesus Soto	UD	6	Apr 30, 2005	Isle of Capri Casino, Lula, Mississippi, U.S.	
8	Win	8–0	Larry Cunningham	TKO	4	Apr 23, 2005	Fitzgeralds Casino and Hotel, Tunica Resorts, Mississippi, U.S.	
7	Win	7–0	Oscar Perez	TKO	1 (4), 2:23	Apr 9, 2005	Don Haskins Center, El Paso, Texas, U.S.	
6	Win	6–0	Sheldon Mosley	TKO	2 (6)	Feb 19, 2005	Isle of Capri Casino, Lula, Mississippi, U.S.	
5	Win	5–0	Steve Verdin	UD	4	Jan 22, 2005	Fitzgeralds Casino and Hotel, Tunica Resorts, Mississippi, U.S.	
4	Win	4–0	Daniel Craycraft	UD	4	Dec 12, 2004	Convention Center, Washington, D.C., U.S.	
3	Win	3–0	Michael Moss	KO	1 (4), 2:20	Nov 5, 2004	Fitzgeralds Casino and Hotel, Tunica Resorts, Mississippi, U.S.	
2	Win	2–0	Walter Gilliam	UD	4	Oct 23, 2004	Isle of Capri Casino, Lula, Mississippi, U.S.	
1	Win	1–0	Nicholas Dean	TKO	1 (4), 0:22	Sep 25, 2004	FedExForum, Memphis, Tennessee, U.S.	

== See also ==
- List of light-welterweight boxing champions
- List of welterweight boxing champions

Sporting positions
Amateur boxing titles
Previous: Renny Sotero	U.S. Golden Gloves lightweight champion 2001	Next: Lorenzo Reynolds
Regional boxing titles
New title	WBC–USBNC light welterweight champion February 17, 2006 – December 2006; Vacated	Vacant Title next held by Hector Munoz
Vacant Title last held by Henry Bruseles	WBO–NABO light welterweight champion September 7, 2007 – November 2008; Vacated	Vacant Title next held by Victor Ortiz
Vacant Title last held by Terrance Cauthen	NABF light welterweight champion Interim title November 1, 2008 – April 2009; Vacated	Vacant
World boxing titles
New title	WBO light welterweight champion Interim title April 25, 2009 – December 12, 2009; Lost bid for world title	Vacant Title next held by Juan Manuel Márquez
Preceded by Amir Khan	WBA light welterweight champion Super title December 10, 2011 – July 11, 2012; Stripped	Succeeded by Amir Khan reinstated
Preceded by Amir Khan	IBF light welterweight champion December 10, 2011 – April 11, 2015; Stripped	Vacant Title next held by César Cuenca
Preceded by David Avanesyan	WBA welterweight champion Regular title February 18, 2017 – October 3, 2017; Vacated	Vacant Title next held by Lucas Matthysse
