= Tommy Rainone =

American boxer

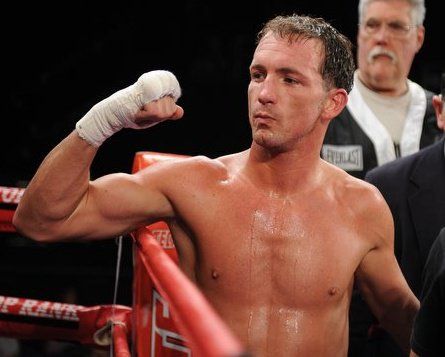

Personal information
- Nickname: Razor
- Nationality: American
- Born: January 8, 1980 (age 46) Elmont, New York
- Height: 5 ft 8 in (173 cm)
- Weight: Welterweight

Boxing career
- Stance: Southpaw

Boxing record
- Total fights: 34
- Wins: 26
- Win by KO: 6
- Losses: 7
- Draws: 1
- No contests: 0

Tommy Rainone (born January 8, 1980) is an American professional boxer.

== Early life ==
Rainone's love affair with boxing began at the age of seven. After watching Rocky for the first time, the Plainview Long Island native began to seek out a gym where he could pursue the sport that had suddenly captivated him. His search would prove fruitless until the age of 17 when he stepped into the Westbury Boxing Club. Boxing couldn't have entered his life at a more appropriate time in his life.

“There’s no question about it, I was definitely able to channel a lot of my anger as a youth into boxing."

Rainone was a troubled teen. He had been kicked out of several schools. After middle school, he was sent to live with his father on Staten Island. His father placed him in an all boys Staten Island Catholic School hoping the added structure would set the young man straight. It didn't work out as intended.

"You can’t take a kid who has been getting into trouble in public schools his whole life and put him in a Catholic school. I was a freshman at the time and it only took me about three months to get kicked out of that school. I went back to Long Island from there.

"My teenage years I was a very frustrated and angry person. I just had an attitude that the world was against me and boxing was an incredible outlet for me. Once I started getting into boxing I put the rest of the troublemaking off to the side and started really getting a little more focused with my life.”

== Amateur career ==
Rainone's amateur career was brief, consisting of approximately 30 fights. In that short span he fought a variety of world class flyer including former welterweight world champion Luis Collazo and light-welterweight contender Francisco "El Gato" Figueroa.

"I had two fights so far and I had to fight a guy named Leon Hinds, who went on to be ranked number three in the nation. I didn’t know it at the time, but he had around 60 fights. Having to survive a storm like that so early in my career made me improve my defense. I was always matched tough, and it was always expected thing to get matched tough. I went to tournaments knowing I wasn’t going to get easy fights. As soon as they called my name, I pretty much rolled my eyes because I knew they were going to match me hard."

Still a young man, Rainone's focus was anything but unw.

"When I was in the amateurs, I cut a lot of corners. I was having a good time partying, going out and just being young but doing so while half assing it boxing. I stopped boxing a couple a months after turning 23 because I had to make a decision to either continue having fun or to get serious about boxing and i was not mature enough to take the sport serious at that stage in my life. I realized that I could no longer do both. I took a break from boxing deciding that i was threw with the amateurs and would return to the sport to turn pro if and when i was ready to take it serious, i started doing some traveling, lived life with out restriction and just enjoyed myself for three years."

== Professional career ==
Rainone returned to boxing in 2006 after spending three and a half years away from the sport. He trained for six months before making his pro debut against ten-fight veteran Marquis McConnell at the Huntington Hilton Hotel in Melville. In front of a huge, supportive local crowd, Rainone boxed his way to a shutout victory.

"If you looked him up, he is now a light-heavyweight. It was the only time he fought at 147, he was naturally fighting at 160, and he cut the weight. By the time he got in the ring, he was back up to 160-165. He was a big guy."

After a second victory in December 2006 Rainone would start 2007 by winning two fights in a 5-day span followed by a third victory fifteen days later.

Rainone won his first 11 bouts. One of the highlights of his early career was performing in the legendary boxing venue The Blue Horizon in Philadelphia. Rainone won a unanimous decision over Jaime Morales that night.

He ran into his first setback in June 2008 when he dropped a controversial split decision to Manuel Guzman in Brooklyn. Rainone took the fight on two weeks notice. On the second day of training, Rainone sustained a cut under his left eye as the result of an elbow. He went to the hospital but was told he didn't need stitches. Being that he has great faith in his cutman George Mitchell and that the cut was not in a position that could affect his vision, he went forward with the fight. To stem the risk, the fight was reduced from six rounds to four.

"It was no walk in the park but there is no way I lost the fight," Rainone says. "Originally I pulled out of the fight but the promoter Tommy Gallagher wanted me to fight because I was going to sell a lot of tickets.

"My friend John Scully warned me 'if you get hit with a nothing jab, the cut is going to open up.' I started bleeding in the third round but I didn't think it would affect the judges. It was stupidity on my behalf to go into the fight with a cut. He's turned me down six times for a rematch."

His second loss came in his next fight - also a split decision - against Henry White Jr. in Melville. "He beat me fair and square. There was so much stress before this fight. I was in tremendous shape but mentally I wasn't prepared." After this fight he parted ways with his manager Luigi Olcese, whom he had been with for three fights.

Rainone returned to his winning ways in December 2008. To find a fight he flew all the way to his trainer's hometown of Benito Juárez, Buenos Aires, Argentina to face Santos Galli. Rainone won the first six rounds before stunning Galli the seventh with a left cross to the head, followed by a left to the body which put him down. Upon rising at the count of seven, Galli informed the ref that he had enough. "It was an amazing experience, they treated me like royalty there" said Rainone. "I will be going again to fight there, most likely."

Rainone unsuccessfully challenged for the New York State welterweight title in 2009.

Rainone still trains at the Westbury Boxing Gym under former fighter Jorge Gallardo. As a trainer, Gallardo guided the careers of Jake Rodríguez, leading him to the IBF junior welterweight title, and Willy Wise. Former IBF junior welterweight champion Jake Rodriguez has often assisted in Rainone's training and has worked his corner many times.

"Boxing is something that I have always dreamed of doing and I am doing it. Most people in this world make compromise after compromise in their lives until they're so far removed from their original dreams that they can barely remember what they were in the first place. A lot of people have dreams of being a firefighter, a baseball player, a movie star or musician but it doesn’t always work out like that because priorities get in the way, boxing was always a passion and priorities. If I accomplished nothing forward for the rest of my career in boxing at least I can say that I gave it my best shot and that I did what I always wanted to do.”

2010 was a milestone year for Rainone. He opened the year with a unanimous decision win over Gerardo Cesar Prieto at Madison Square Garden. Five months later he dropped a decision to Terry Butterbaugh on the first-ever boxing card at the new Yankee Stadium. The main event in the Bronx was a WBA 154-pound title fight between Yuri Foreman and Miguel Cotto televised by HBO.

Rainone then won all three of his fights in 2011 including a six-round unanimous decision win over Brad Jackson in Madison Square Garden. The main event that evening was also televised by HBO featured Nonito Donaire vs. Omar Narváez.

The following year consisted of four fights and three wins. The first fight was a decisive win in Staten Island, which gave Rainone the unique distinction of winning bouts in each of the five Boroughs. Rainone finished 2012 with a return to Long Island for his first fight there in over three years to score a unanimous 10-round win over former national amateur champion Robbie Cannon, winning the vacant IBA Americas title. Rainone dropped Cannon in the 1st and 9th rounds during the course of the bout.

Rainone fought only once in 2013, winning a six-round split decision over James Winchester at the Westchester County Center in White Plains, New York. Following his 2013 fight he returned to the ring in 2014 winning a 6-round unanimous decision over Jason Davis, in Long Island City, New York. On September 17 Rainone fought in Santo Domingo, Dominican Republic, walking away with a controversial split decision draw against Juan Carlos Santos. Rainone returned to the ring less than two months later on November 13, winning a 10-round unanimous decision over Carl McNickles at The Space at Westbury, Long Island New York. Rainone dropped Mcknickles in the third and sixth round, picking up the vacant USBO welterweight title with the victory.

Soon after his USBO victory, Rainone fought the biggest fight of his career to date. He headlined, Roc Nation Sports inaugural boxing event Throne Boxing. The fight took place at Madison Square Garden on January 9, 2015, and was televised live on Fox Sports 1 with Dusty Hernández-Harrison winning in a 10-round UD.

Rainone returned two months later to score a decisive knockout in the last round of his fight against Allen Litzau, which was televised on SportsNet New York. Rainone once again fought a televised fight on SportsNet New York at The Space at Westbury, this time defeating Francisco Javier Reza by unanimous decision. Rainone then went up in weight to challenge former IBF light middleweight champion Ishe Smith on December 13 of 2015 in Las Vegas at the Palms Casino Resort, coming up short in losing a 10 Round Decision. Three months later, Tommy started his 2016 by making his Atlantic City debut defeating veteran Maurice Chalmers in an 8-round decision.

== Outside of boxing ==
Away from the ring Rainone is a supervisor for Hilton Hotels. "All of the revenue that comes into the hotel, from room revenue to food and beverages to meetings so on, I crunch those numbers every night, back out the taxes making sure everything adds up and balances which all is a part of my month end. I have to smile and be polite in the professional world, it's like night and day from my other job."

Rainone is godfather to former NABF Junior Welterweight Champion Gato Figueroa's son, Blake.

He is also close friends with horror movie writer, director, producer Frank Sabatella, who did the movie Blood Night: The Legend of Mary Hatchet. Frank has done Rainone's promo pictures and fight posters since 2006.

Tommy has been self-managed his entire career and also manages welterweight Rich Neves.

Rainone is a cast member of the Off Broadway boxing play, Kid Shamrock, appearing in the production in the winter of 2011 and the summer of 2012. He was also a judge, along with Harold Lederman and Michael Bentt at the first annual Shadow Box Film Festival, the all boxing film fest.

Upon his retirement from boxing, Rainone has been a part of the boxing media. From 2018 to 2025, he wrote articles for notable boxing web sites, Brick City Boxing and NYFights. He has also worked as a fight-night broadcaster calling matches for a variety of networks and platforms, including NBC Sports Live, Fightnight Live, BXNG TV and Millions.Co. He has called fights from Kings Theatre, Encore Casino, Boardwalk Hall, Ballys in Atlantic City and the 2300 Arena.

In 2025, Rainone launched a YouTube podcasting channel with former world champion Paulie Malignaggi. The series, known as Tommy and Paulie's Big Fights Forecast, previews upcoming boxing matches and analyzes betting odds and parlays.

== Professional boxing record ==
26 Wins (6 knockouts, 20 decisions), 7 Losses (0 knockouts, 7 decisions), 1 Draws
Res.	Record	Opponent	Type	Rd., Time	Date	Location	Notes
Win	25-7-1	(United States) Maurice Chalmers	UD	8	2016-03-19	(United States) The Claridge Hotel (Atlantic City), Atlantic City, New Jersey	
Loss	24-7-1	(United States) Ishe Smith	UD	10	2015-12-18	(United States) Palms Casino Resort, Las Vegas, Nevada	
Win	24-6-1	(United States) Francisco Javier Reza	UD	6	2015-09-10	(United States) The Space at Westbury, Westbury, New York	
Win	23-6-1	(United States) Allen Litzau	TKO	6(6),2:57	2015-03-13	(United States) The Space at Westbury, Westbury, New York	
Loss	22-6-1	(United States) Dusty Hernández-Harrison	UD	10	2015-01-09	(United States) The Theater at Madison Square Garden, New York, New York	For vacant WBC Continental Americas welterweight title
Win	22-5-1	(United States) Carl McNickles	UD	10	2014-11-13	(United States) The Space at Westbury, Westbury, New York	Won vacant USBO welterweight title
Draw	21-5-1	(Dominican Republic) Juan Carlos Santos	SD	4	2014-09-17	Polideportivo De Sabana Perdida, Santo Domingo, Dominican Republic	
Win	21-5	(United States) Jason Davis	UD	6	2014-03-22	(United States) Five Star Banquet, Queens, New York	
Win	20-5	(United States) James Winchester	SD	6	2013-05-24	(United States) Westchester County Center, White Plains, New York	
Win	19-5	(United States) Robbie Cannon	UD	10	2012-11-15	(United States) Plattduetsche Restaurant, Franklin Square, New York	Won vacant IBA Americas welterweight title
Win	18-5	(United States) Kevin Carter	UD	6	2012-08-18	(United States) Marriott Downtown, Greensboro, North Carolina	
Loss	17-5	(United States) Fitzgerald Johnson	UD	8	2012-06-13	(United States) Robert Treat Hotel, Newark, New Jersey	
Win	17-4	(United States) Josh Williams	UD	4	2012-01-19	(United States) Hilton Garden Inn, Staten Island, New York, New York	
Win	16-4	(United States) Brad Jackson	UD	6	2011-10-22	(United States) Madison Square Garden WaMu Theater, New York, New York	
Win	15-4	(United States) Norman Allen	UD	6	2011-06-24	(United States) Cordon Bleu, Woodhaven, New York	
Win	14-4	(United States) Arthur Medina	UD	6	2011-04-02	(United States) Aviator Sports Complex, Brooklyn, New York	
Loss	13-4	(United States) Terry Buteerrbaugh	UD	6	2010-06-05	(United States) Yankee Stadium, Bronx, New York	
Win	13-3	(Mexico) Gerardo Cesar Prieto	UD	4	2010-01-23	(United States) Madison Square Garden, New York, New York	
Loss	12–3	(Puerto Rico) Daniel Sostre	UD	8	2009-05-08	(United States) Plattduetsche Park Restaurant, Franklin Square, New York	For New York State welterweight title
Win	12-2	(Uruguay) Santos Galli	KO	7	2008-12-05	Benito Juarez, Argentina	
Loss	11–2	(United States) Henry White Jr	SD	6	2008-09-26	(United States) Huntington Hilton Hotel, Melville, New York	
Loss	11–1	(United States) Manuel Guzman	SD	4	2008-06-04	(United States) Aviator Sports Complex, Bronx, New York	
Win	11–0	(United States) William Wilson	UD	4	2008-04-16	(United States) Hammerstein Ballroom, Madison Square Garden, New York	
Win	10–0	(United States) William Wilson	TKO	4	2007-10-26	(United States) Monticello Raceway, New York, New York	
Win	9–0	(United States) Jaime Morales	UD	6	2007-10-12	(United States) Blue Horizon, Philadelphia, Pennsylvania	
Win	8–0	(United States) Jorge Delgado	MD	4	2007-07-27	(United States) City Center, Saratoga Springs, New York	
Win	7–0	(United States) Ronny Glover	KO	2	2007-04-11	(United States) The Citadel, Charleston, South Carolina	
Win	6–0	(United States) Samuel Ortiz Gomez	UD	4	2007-03-23	(United States) Huntington Townhouse, Huntington Station, New York	
Win	5–0	(United States) Ronny Glover	KO	2	2007-02-09	(United States) Suffolk Community College, Seldon, New York	
Win	4–0	(United States) John Lipscomb	MD	4	2007-01-25	(United States) Paradise Theater, Bronx, New York	
Win	3–0	(United States) Jerry Kelly	UD	4	2007-01-20	(United States) Fernwood Resort, Bushkill, Pennsylvania	
Win	2–0	(United States) Jesse Gomez	UD	4	2006-12-08	(United States) Huntington Townhouse, Huntington Station, New York	
Win	1–0	(United States) Marquis McConnell	UD	4	2006-09-15	(United States) Huntington Hilton Hotel, Melville, New York	
