= Lucas Matthysse =

Argentine boxer (born 1982)

Personal information
- Nickname: La Máquina ("The Machine")
- Born: Lucas Martín Matthysse; 27 September 1982 (age 44) Trelew, Chubut, Argentina
- Height: 5 ft 6 in (168 cm)
- Weight: Light welterweight; Welterweight

Boxing career
- Reach: 69 in (175 cm)
- Stance: Orthodox

Boxing record
- Total fights: 45
- Wins: 39
- Win by KO: 36
- Losses: 5
- No contests: 1

Lucas Martín Matthysse (Spanish: [ˈlukas maˈtise]; born 27 September 1982) is an Argentine former professional boxer who competed from 2004 to 2018. He held the WBA (Regular) welterweight title in 2018 and the WBC interim super lightweight title from 2012 to 2013. Matthysse was known for his aggressive pressure fighting style and formidable punching power. He is the younger brother of welterweight contender, Walter Matthysse and former featherweight world champion of boxing, Edith Soledad Matthysse.

== Amateur career ==
During his amateur career, Matthysse fought in the 2003 Pan American Games at Santo Domingo, Dominican Republic, where he went on to stop Colombia's Breidis Prescott in just the first round.

Lucas has faced Marcos Maidana four times in the amateurs with Maidana winning three times while fighting the fourth to a draw.

== Professional career ==
=== Light welterweight ===
In June 2004, Lucas won his pro debut against Leandro Almagro, on a card that also featured his brother Walter.

=== Matthysse vs. Judah ===
On 6 November 2010 Matthysse lost a very disputed split decision against former world champion Zab Judah in the main event of an HBO card. Judah began the busier fighter, using the jab and trying to land uppercuts for the first two rounds, while Matthysse worked on the body. In round three, a clash of heads opened a cut outside of the left eye of Judah. Matthysse displayed more aggression and became the aggressor in the third and the fourth round and Judah switched to a defensive tactic. In the next two rounds, the American boxer picked up the pace, beginning to land more combinations. Judah continued to box throughout the ninth round but Matthysse began to show more power in the tenth, focusing on the head of his opponent and knocking down the American boxer after a hard right hand to the jaw. Judah got up, but he was hurt. The Argentine fighter tried to press the attack after the knockdown. Two judges scored the fight 114–113 for Judah, while the other judge scored it 114–113 for Matthysse.

=== Matthysse vs. Alexander ===
On 25 June 2011 Matthysse faced former world champion Devon Alexander and lost another close, but hugely controversial split decision. The judges in the Family Arena in St. Charles had the fight 96–93 and 95–94 for Alexander, and 96–93 for Matthysse.

=== Matthysse vs. Martínez, Soto and Olusegun ===
Lucas was forced to withdraw from a fight versus Erik Morales in one of the featured bouts on the Floyd Mayweather Jr. vs. Victor Ortiz HBO PPV undercard at the MGM Grand in Paradise, Nevada, citing a viral infection that had kept him from training.

Lucas fought Mexican Martín Ángel Martínez on 10 February 2012 for the vacant WBA Inter-Continental light welterweight title at the Gimnasio Municipal, Chubut, Argentina in a scheduled 12 round bout. The Mexican retired after the 5th round.

The stay-busy victory over the 20-year-old Mexican fighter set up a Showtime televised showdown between Matthysse and former 130-pound and lightweight beltholder Humberto Soto on 23 June 2012. Both fighters traded big shots in the opening rounds but the Matthysse was able to land consistent big body shots and came through this fight with another fifth-round TKO.

Matthysse then faced undefeated Nigerian-born British professional boxer Ajose Olusegun on 8 September 2012. Olusegun had been declared the mandatory challenger for the WBC light welterweight title going into the fight. The first few rounds were good exchanges for the two brawlers. However, on the tenth round the hard punches from the Argentinian proved too much for the unbeaten Nigerian and therefore the referee stopped the fight via 10th-round TKO.

=== Matthysse vs. Peterson ===
On 18 May 2013 Matthysse faced Lamont Peterson in a non-title match in Atlantic City, New Jersey. At the end of the second round Matthysse landed a hard right hand to the body followed of a left hook to the head, that knocked Peterson down. In the third round Matthysse kept the pressure on Peterson, knocking him down twice in that round. At 46 seconds of round 3 referee Steve Smoger stopped the fight after the second Peterson knock down. The winner via TKO was Matthysse.

After the fight, Golden Boy Promotions CEO, Richard Schaefer, declared Matthysse the next Manny Pacquiao.

The victory was considered the biggest of Matthysse's career, and his first step in the door to super stardom. He then faced unified 140 lb champion Danny García on 14 September 2013 as part of the undercard to the Floyd Mayweather Jr. vs. Canelo Álvarez main event.

=== Matthysse vs. García ===
Going into his fight on 14 September against García, Matthysse was a heavy favorite despite being the challenger. Nevertheless, García stood firm and fought a mature fight, trading rounds early with Matthysse. In the middle rounds, Matthysse developed an injury to his right eye from García's flinched right hand, which the young champ exploited. Matthysee bravely battled back, but García knocked him down in the 11th round, a first for the challenger. The twelfth round saw García lose a point for a low blow, and ended in a slug-fest. The last ten seconds of round 12 proved thrilling, both fighters went toe to toe. In the end, the judges handed García a unanimous decision: 115–111, 114–112 and 114–112.

=== Matthysse vs. Postol ===
On 3 October 2015 Matthysse once again went in as a solid favorite to defeat the undefeated Ukrainian Viktor Postol. But Postol was able to take advantage of his four-inch reach advantage and outwork Matthysse from the outside before sealing the fight with a counter right hand that knocked Matthysse down. Matthysse then made no attempt to get up from the canvas citing a potential injury in his eye in his post-fight interview. He would spend a year-and-a-half out of the ring after undergoing eye surgery and taking time off to recover.

=== Matthysse vs. Taylor ===
On 6 May 2017, Matthysse fought Emanuel Taylor. Matthysse won the fight via a technical knockout in the fifth round.

=== Matthysse vs. Kiram ===
In his next fight, Matthysse fought Tewa Kiram, who was ranked #1 by the WBA at welterweight. Matthysse managed to knockout his opponent in the eighth round to come out with the victory.

=== Matthysse vs. Pacquiao ===
Matthysse lost his WBA (Regular) welterweight title against Manny Pacquiao on 15 July 2018 at the Axiata Arena in Kuala Lumpur. Pacquiao won the fight via TKO in round 7, marking the first time in nine years that Pacquiao had finished an opponent. Matthysse subsequently announced his retirement from boxing on 2 August 2018.

== Professional boxing record ==
45 fights	39 wins	5 losses
By knockout	36	2
By decision	2	3
By disqualification	1	0
No contests	1	

No.	Result	Record	Opponent	Type	Round, time	Date	Location	Notes
45	Loss	39–5 (1)	Manny Pacquiao	TKO	7 (12), 2:43	15 Jul 2018	Axiata Arena, Kuala Lumpur, Malaysia	Lost WBA (Regular) welterweight title
44	Win	39–4 (1)	Tewa Kiram	KO	8 (12), 1:21	27 Jan 2018	The Forum, Inglewood, California, U.S.	Won vacant WBA (Regular) welterweight title
43	Win	38–4 (1)	Emanuel Taylor	TKO	5 (10), 2:21	6 May 2017	T-Mobile Arena, Paradise, Nevada, U.S.	Won vacant WBA Inter-Continental and WBO International welterweight titles
42	Loss	37–4 (1)	Viktor Postol	KO	10 (12), 2:58	3 Oct 2015	StubHub Center, Carson, California, U.S.	For vacant WBC light welterweight title
41	Win	37–3 (1)	Ruslan Provodnikov	MD	12	18 Apr 2015	Turning Stone Resort Casino, Verona, New York, U.S.	
40	Win	36–3 (1)	Roberto Ortiz	KO	2 (12), 2:45	6 Sep 2014	U.S. Bank Arena, Cincinnati, Ohio, U.S.	Won WBC Silver light welterweight title
39	Win	35–3 (1)	John Molina Jr.	KO	11 (12), 0:22	26 Apr 2014	StubHub Center, Carson, California, U.S.	Won vacant WBC Continental Americas light welterweight title
38	Loss	34–3 (1)	Danny Garcia	UD	12	14 Sep 2013	MGM Grand Garden Arena, Paradise, Nevada, U.S.	For WBA (Super), WBC, and vacant The Ring light welterweight titles
37	Win	34–2 (1)	Lamont Peterson	TKO	3 (12), 2:14	18 May 2013	Boardwalk Hall, Atlantic City, New Jersey, U.S.	
36	Win	33–2 (1)	Mike Dallas Jr.	KO	1 (12), 2:26	26 Jan 2013	The Joint, Paradise, Nevada, U.S.	Retained WBC interim light welterweight title
35	Win	32–2 (1)	Ajose Olusegun	TKO	10 (12), 2:59	8 Sep 2012	The Joint, Paradise, Nevada, U.S.	Won vacant WBC interim light welterweight title
34	Win	31–2 (1)	Humberto Soto	RTD	5 (12), 3:00	23 Jun 2012	Staples Center, Los Angeles, California, U.S.	Won WBC Inter-Continental light welterweight title
33	Win	30–2 (1)	Martín Ángel Martínez	TKO	6 (12), 0:01	10 Feb 2012	Gimnasio Municipal Nº 1, Trelew, Argentina	Won vacant WBA Inter-Continental light welterweight title
32	Win	29–2 (1)	Sergio Omar Priotti	KO	4 (10), 0:27	9 Dec 2011	Ciclista Juninense, Junín, Argentina	
31	Loss	28–2 (1)	Devon Alexander	SD	10	25 Jun 2011	Family Arena, St. Charles, Missouri, U.S.	
30	Win	28–1 (1)	DeMarcus Corley	TKO	8 (12), 1:02	21 Jan 2011	Polideportivo Vicente Polimeni, Las Heras, Argentina	Won vacant WBO Inter-Continental light welterweight title
29	Loss	27–1 (1)	Zab Judah	SD	12	6 Nov 2010	Prudential Center, Newark, New Jersey, U.S.	For vacant WBO–NABO light welterweight title
28	Win	27–0 (1)	Rogelio Castañeda Jr.	KO	1 (12), 2:35	28 Aug 2010	Newell's Old Boys, Santa Fe, Argentina	Retained WBO Latino interim light welterweight title
27	Win	26–0 (1)	Vivian Harris	TKO	4 (10), 2:44	20 Feb 2010	El Plaza Condesa, Mexico City, Mexico	
26	Win	25–0 (1)	Florencio Castellano	KO	4 (10)	21 Nov 2009	Lawn Tennis Club, Buenos Aires, Argentina	Won WBO Latino interim light welterweight title
25	Win	24–0 (1)	Luis Ernesto José	KO	2 (10)	21 Apr 2009	Newell's Old Boys, Santa Fe, Argentina	
24	Win	23–0 (1)	Carlos Adán Jerez	UD	10	20 Dec 2008	Ciclista Juninense, Junín, Argentina	
23	NC	22–0 (1)	Rogelio Castañeda Jr.	NC	3 (10), 0:50	12 Sep 2008	QuikTrip Park, Grand Prairie, Texas, U.S.	Castañeda cut from an accidental head clash
22	Win	22–0	Gilbert Quiros	TKO	4 (10)	13 Jun 2008	Ciclista Juninense, Junín, Argentina	
21	Win	21–0	Jorge Medrano	RTD	4 (10)	29 Feb 2008	Parque Prado, General Arenales, Argentina	
20	Win	20–0	Esteban de Jesus Morales	KO	2 (8)	2 Nov 2007	Rojas, Argentina	
19	Win	19–0	Ariel Francisco Burgos	KO	4 (12), 2:14	2 Jun 2007	Ciclista Juninense, Junín, Argentina	Retained WBO Latino light welterweight title
18	Win	18–0	Ramon Duran	KO	1 (8), 2:05	4 May 2007	MGM Grand Garden Arena, Paradise, Nevada, U.S.	
17	Win	17–0	Alejandro Ciacia	KO	1 (8), 0:55	30 Mar 2007	Ciclista Juninense, Junín, Argentina	
16	Win	16–0	Diego Jesús Ponce	KO	2 (12), 0:56	21 Oct 2006	Ciclista Juninense, Junín, Argentina	Retained WBO Latino light welterweight title
15	Win	15–0	Justo Evangelista Martínez	KO	2 (6), 2:10	1 Sep 2006	Club Atletico Sportivo Rojas, Buenos Aires, Argentina	
14	Win	14–0	Ceferino Zampatti	KO	1 (6), 1:40	7 Jul 2006	Polideportivo Municipal Nº 2, Buenos Aires, Argentina	
13	Win	13–0	Hernan Abraham Valenzuela	TKO	1 (6), 2:35	5 May 2006	Ciclista Juninense, Junín, Argentina	
12	Win	12–0	Victor Daniel Rios	KO	2 (12), 2:13	1 Apr 2006	Unión, Santa Fe, Argentina	Won vacant WBO Latino light welterweight title
11	Win	11–0	Hernan Abraham Valenzuela	RTD	3 (6)	17 Mar 2006	Club Rivadavia, Lincoln, Argentina	
10	Win	10–0	Vicente Luis Burgo	KO	2 (6), 1:01	16 Dec 2005	Club Atlético Belgrano, Buenos Aires, Argentina	
9	Win	9–0	Jorge Alberto Carballo	TKO	2 (8)	25 Nov 2005	Estadio Socios Fundadores, Comodoro Rivadavia, Argentina	
8	Win	8–0	Marcelo Omar Lazarte	RTD	3 (6), 2:54	8 Oct 2005	Club Atlético Lanús, Buenos Aires, Argentina	
7	Win	7–0	Jesus Ceferino Vergara	RTD	1 (6), 1:18	12 Aug 2005	Orfeo Superdomo, Córdoba, Argentina	
6	Win	6–0	Nestor Fabian Sanchez	TKO	3 (4)	18 Apr 2005	Hotel Cordoba Plaza, Córdoba, Argentina	
5	Win	5–0	Hugo Antonio Aquino	KO	1 (4)	18 Feb 2005	Comodoro Rivadavia, Argentina	
4	Win	4–0	Adan Basilio Mironchik	KO	1 (4)	13 Nov 2004	Club Atlético Belgrano, Buenos Aires, Argentina	
3	Win	3–0	Bernardino Gonzalez	DQ	3 (4)	3 Sep 2004	Estadio Socios Fundadores, Comodoro Rivadavia, Argentina	
2	Win	2–0	Luis Roberto Aguilar	TKO	1 (6), 2:44	17 Jul 2004	Club Ciclista Juninense, Buenos Aires, Argentina	
1	Win	1–0	Leandro Almagro	TKO	2 (4)	4 Jun 2004	Gimnasio Municipal Nº 1, Trelew, Argentina	

Sporting positions
Regional boxing titles
Vacant Title last held by Arturo Morua	WBO Latino light welterweight champion 1 April 2006 – July 2007; Vacated	Vacant Title next held by Alex de Jesús
Vacant Title last held by César Cuenca	WBO Latino light welterweight champion Interim title 21 November 2009 – 6 November 2010; Lost bid for NABO title	Vacant Title next held by Jesús Pabón
Vacant Title last held by Ruslan Provodnikov	WBO Inter-Continental light welterweight champion 21 January 2011 – June 2011; Vacated	Vacant Title next held by Danny García
Vacant Title last held by Brunet Zamora	WBA Inter-Continental light welterweight champion 10 February 2012 – June 2011; Vacated	Vacant Title next held by Paul McCloskey
Vacant Title last held by Tony Luis	WBC Continental Americas light welterweight champion 23 June 2012 – 9 September 2012; Won interim title	Vacant Title next held by Ricky Álvarez
Vacant Title last held by Ricky Álvarez	WBC Continental Americas light welterweight champion 26 April 2014 – 6 September 2014; Won Silver title	Vacant Title next held by Amir Imam
Preceded by Roberto Ortiz	WBC Silver light welterweight champion 6 September 2014 – March 2015; Vacated	Vacant Title next held by Luca Giacón
Vacant Title last held by Taras Shelestyuk	WBA Inter-Continental welterweight champion 6 May 2017 – 27 January 2018; Won world title	Vacant Title next held by Mario Barrios
Vacant Title last held by Manny Pacquiao	WBO International welterweight champion 6 May 2017 – December 2017; Vacated	Vacant Title next held by Custio Clayton
World boxing titles
Vacant Title last held by Kostya Tszyu	WBC light welterweight champion Interim title 8 September 2012 – 14 September 2013; Lost bid for full title	Vacant Title next held by Regis Prograis
Vacant Title last held by Lamont Peterson	WBA welterweight champion Regular title 27 January 2017 – 15 July 2018	Succeeded by Manny Pacquiao
Awards
Previous: Timothy Bradley vs. Ruslan Provodnikov	The Ring Fight of the Year vs. John Molina Jr. 2014	Next: Francisco Vargas vs. Takashi Miura
Previous: Timothy Bradley vs. Ruslan Provodnikov	BWAA Fight of the Year vs. John Molina Jr. 2014	Next: Francisco Vargas vs. Takashi Miura
