= Nonito Donaire vs. Omar Narváez =

Boxing match

- Date: 22 October 2011
- Venue: The Theater at Madison Square Garden, New York City, New York, U.S.
- Title(s) on the line: WBC and WBO bantamweight titles

Tale of the tape
Boxer	(Philippines) Nonito Donaire	(Argentina) Omar Narváez
Nickname	"The Filipino Flash"	"El Huracán"
Hometown	Talibon, Bohol, Philippines	Trelew, Chubut, Argentina
Purse	$725,000	$250,000
Pre-fight record	26–1 (18 KO)	35–0–2 (19 KO)
Age	28 years, 11 months	36 years
Height	5 ft 7 in (170 cm)	5 ft 3 in (160 cm)
Weight	116 1/2 lb (53 kg)	117 lb (53 kg)
Style	Orthodox	Southpaw
Recognition	WBC and WBO; Bantamweight Champion; The Ring No. 4 ranked pound-for-pound fighter 2-division world champion	WBO; Junior Bantamweight Champion; 2-division world champion

Result
- Donaire wins via 12-round unanimous decision (120–108, 120–108, 120–108)

Nonito Donaire vs. Omar Narváez was a professional boxing match contested on 22 October 2011, for the WBC and WBO bantamweight championship.

== Background ==
Shortly after the most significant win of his career, a highlight reel knockout of Mexico's Fernando Montiel, Donaire left Top Rank and signed with rival Golden Boy Promotions. The deal was put on hold when an arbitrator upheld Top Rank's contract and enjoined Golden Boy from promoting Donaire. Eventually, Donaire worked out his differences with Top Rank, which signed him to a contract extension in mid-July.

Donaire entered the fight riding a nine-year, 25-bout winning streak, which includes an IBF/IBO Flyweight title knockout victory of defending champion Vic Darchinyan, and a fourth-round blasting of former WBA Bantamweight champion Wladimir Sidorenko last December. However, Donaire's most impressive victory occurred in his last fight, on February 19, when he knocked out defending WBC/WBO Bantamweight champion Fernando Montiel in the second round, ending Montiel's 25-bout winning streak while also claiming his third world title in as many weight divisions. Ten of Donaire's last 11 victories had come by way of knockout. Donaire was making his first (and only) title defense against junior bantamweight titleholder Omar Narvaez.

Omar was making his U.S. debut having successfully defended his title 16 times during his seven-year reign before vacating it in early 2010 to campaign at a heavier weight class. He won the vacant WBO Super Flyweight title in May 2010, pitching a near shutout to win a unanimous decision over Everth Briceno. Narvaez, one of Argentina's most popular fighters, has successfully defended his new title three times, all by unanimous decision, against opponents who had a combined record of 54-2 when he fought them.

== The fight ==
Donaire defeated Narváez via Unanimous Decision (120-108, 120-108, 120-108).

== Undercard ==
Confirmed bouts:

=== Televised ===
- Bantamweight Unified Championship bout: (Philippines) Nonito Donaire (c) vs. (Argentina) Omar Narvaez

Donaire defeated Narváez via Unanimous Decision (120-108, 120-108, 120-108).

=== Preliminary card ===
- Featherweight bout: (United States) Mikey Garcia vs. (Mexico) Juan Carlos Martinez

Garcia defeated Martinez via TKO at 2:46 of the fourth round.

- Lightweight bout: (United States) Michael Brooks vs. (United States) Eddie Ramirez

Brooks defeated Ramirez via Unanimous Decision (40-36, 40-36, 40-36).

- Welterweight bout: (United States) Tommy Rainone vs. (United States) Brad Jackson

Rainone defeated Jackson via Unanimous Decision. (60-54. 59-55, 58-56).

- Super Welterweight bout: (Canada) Mikaël Zewski vs. (United States) Keuntray Henson

Zewski defeated Henson via KO at 1:27 of the first round.

- Light Heavyweight bout: (Republic of Ireland) Sean Monaghan vs. (United States) Anthony Pietrantonio

Monaghan defeated Pietrantonio via TKO at 2:51 of the fifth round.

- Super Flyweight bout: (Puerto Rico) Jonathan González vs. (United States) Jose Rivera

González defeated Rivera via Unanimous Decision. (60-53, 60-53, 59-54).

- Welterweight bout: (United States) Cletus Seldin vs. (United States) Jose Segura Torres

Seldin defeated Torres via TKO at 2:52 of the second round.

== Reported fight earnings ==
- Nonito Donaire $725,000 vs. Omar Narvaez $250,000
- Mikey Garcia $100,750 vs. Juan Carlos Martinez $15,300

== International Broadcasting ==
Country / Region	Broadcaster
United States	HBO
Philippines	ABS-CBN and Studio 23

Preceded by vs. Fernando Montiel	Nonito Donaire's bouts 22 October 2011	Succeeded by vs. Wilfredo Vázquez Jr.
Preceded by vs. William Urina	Omar Narváez's bouts 22 October 2011	Succeeded by vs. José Cabrera
