= Rogelio Castañeda Jr. =

Mexican boxer (born 1979)

Personal information
- Nickname: Cachorro
- Born: September 8, 1976 (age 49) Tijuana, Baja California, Mexico
- Height: 5 ft 8 in (174 cm)
- Weight: Welterweight; Light welterweight

Boxing career
- Reach: 70 in (179 cm)
- Stance: Orthodox

Boxing record
- Total fights: 53
- Wins: 26
- Win by KO: 8
- Losses: 23
- Draws: 3
- No contests: 1

Rogelio Castañeda Jr (born September 8, 1979) is a Mexican professional boxer who competes at welterweight. He is a former WBC FECARBOX and IBA light welterweight champion.

== Pro career ==
In June 2001, Rogelio upset an undefeated Frankie Santos by K.O. to win the WBC FECARBOX Light Welterweight Championship, the bout was held at the Miccosukee Indian Gaming Resort in Miami, Florida.

=== IBA Light Welterweight Championship ===
On May 27, 2005 Castañeda beat title contender Tomas Barrientes to win the IBA Light Welterweight Championship.

== Professional record ==
26 Wins (8 Knockouts), 22 Defeats, 3 Draws, 1 No Contest
Res.	Record	Opponent	Type	Rd., Time	Date	Location	Notes
Loss	26-22-3 (1)	(Canada) Steve Claggett	TKO	3 (8)	2014-11-21	Chinese Cultural Center, Calgary, Alberta, Canada	
Loss	26-21-3 (1)	(United States) Michael Anderson	UD	8	2014-09-05	(United States) Parsippany PAL, Parsippany, New Jersey, USA	
Loss	26-20-3 (1)	(United States) Jonathan Chicas	KO	4 (6)	2014-02-28	(United States) Fox Theater, Redwood City, California, USA	
Loss	26-19-3 (1)	(Russia) Konstantin Ponomarev	RTD	3 (8)	2013-11-14	(United States) Florentine Gardens, Hollywood, California, USA	
Loss	26-18-3 (1)	(United States) Hector Serrano	UD	8 (8)	2013-10-25	(United States) Pechanga Resort & Casino, Temecula, California, USA	
Loss	26-17-3 (1)	(United States) Oscar Godoy	KO	2 (6)	2013-08-23	(United States) Omega Products International, Corona, California, USA	
Loss	26-16-3 (1)	(Argentina) Lucas Matthysse	KO	1 (12)	2010-08-27	Club Atletico Newell's Old Boys, Rosario, Santa Fe, Argentina	For interim WBO Latino Light Welterweight title.
Win	26-15-3 (1)	(Mexico) Edgar Quiroz	UD	4 (4)	2010-04-10	Palenque del Parque Morelos, Tijuana, Baja California, Mexico	
Win	25-15-3 (1)	(Mexico) Juan Ruiz	UD	4 (4)	2009-12-19	Arena Itson, Ciudad Obregon, Sonora, Mexico	
Loss	24-15-3 (1)	(Thailand) Sirimongkol Singmanasak	MD	8 (8)	2008-11-22	(United States) MGM Grand, Las Vegas, Nevada, USA	
NC	24-14-3 (1)	(Argentina) Lucas Matthysse	NC	3 (10)	2008-09-12	(United States) Quick Trip Ballpark, Grand Prairie, Texas, USA	
Loss	24-14-3	(United States) Lamont Peterson	TKO	9 (10)	2008-07-05	(United States) Planet Hollywood Resort and Casino, Las Vegas, Nevada, USA	
Win	24-13-3	(Mexico) Ubaldo Hernandez	UD	10 (10)	2007-10-19	(United States) Feather Falls Casino, Oroville, California, USA	
Loss	23-13-3	(United States) Demetrius Hopkins	UD	12 (12)	2006-11-25	(United States) Dodge Arena, Hidalgo, Texas, USA	

== See also ==
- List of Mexican boxing world champions
