= Josesito López =

American boxer (born 1984)

Josesito Lopez
Personal information
- Nickname: Riverside Rocky
- Born: José Manuel López; July 19, 1984 (age 42) Riverside, California, U.S.
- Height: 5 ft 9 in (175 cm)
- Weight: Light welterweight Welterweight; Light middleweight

Boxing career
- Reach: 72 in (183 cm)
- Stance: Orthodox

Boxing record
- Total fights: 48
- Wins: 38
- Win by KO: 21
- Losses: 9
- No contests: 1

José Manuel "Josesito" López (born July 19, 1984) is an American professional boxer and former world title challenger.

== Professional career ==
=== NABF light welterweight championship ===
On January 28, 2011 López took out undefeated Mike Dallas Jr. by knockout in the seventh round, to win the North American Boxing Federation Light Welterweight Championship. The bout was televised on ESPN's Friday Night Fights.

López was originally scheduled to fight Kendall Holt in a defense of his title sometime in 2012, but Holt pulled out of the fight. Victor Ortiz was in need of an opponent after his scheduled opponent for June 23, 2012, Andre Berto, failed a drug test which scuttled their rematch for the interim WBC title. Lopez stepped up to face Ortiz and defeated him by technical knockout in the tenth round. During the ninth round, Lopez connected with a punch to Ortiz's jaw that broke it on impact and rendered him unable to continue. López is now represented by Al Haymon.

=== López vs. Álvarez ===
After scoring a huge upset against Ortiz, Lopez was given the opportunity to fight for the WBC junior middleweight title against Saul "Canelo" Álvarez. Lopez had just moved up from Junior Welterweight (140) to fight Ortiz and was now being asked to move up a further seven pounds, and was not given a chance by too many press row scorers, with most feeling he was out of his depth. This was unfortunately proven to be true. On September 15, 2012, the two combatants squared off in the ring, and from very early on Álvarez' size and experience began to show through, knocking Lopez down in the second, third, and fourth rounds en route to stopping him in the fifth round after referee Joe Cortez determined he was taking too much punishment.

=== López vs. Maidana ===
Following his stoppage loss to Álvarez, Lopez was paired up with Marcos Maidana, a former junior welterweight contender famed for his punching power and ferocity. Maidana had just come off a win against former junior middleweight contender Jesús Soto Karass and was looking to get back into title contention. The bout itself was fought on June 8, 2013 at the Home Depot Center. Lopez started off the bout well, countering the more powerful Maidana well. However, in the sixth Lopez began to fade from his opponents power and relentlessness, and following a brutal right hand from Maidana, Lopez was dropped. Lopez made the count, but was unable to clear his head and was stopped by a brutal assault of punches, giving him his sixth professional loss.

=== Lopez vs. Berto ===
He appeared in the first Premier Boxing Champions on Spike TV broadcast, against Andre Berto, on March 13, 2015. The fight took place at the Citizens Bank Arena in Ontario, CA and was part of a double main event. Josesito was stopped in the 6th round after the second consecutive knockdown without being given a countdown and the stoppage is considered controversial. The referee was Raul Cantu Jr, who has received negative comments on his performance.

=== López vs. Muñoz cancellation ===
López was scheduled to face veteran journeyman 25-19-1 (16KOs) Héctor Muñoz in an 8 rounder for February 10, 2018 on the undercard of Garcia vs. Lipinets. The undercard fight was postponed along with the main event for March 10 when Lipinets suffered a hand injury. The fight with Muñoz did not happen for undisclosed reasons.

=== Lopez vs. Thurman ===
On January 26, 2019, Lopez challenged Keith Thurman for the WBA welterweight title. Lopez was ranked at #7 by the WBA. Thurman started off the fight strong, dropping Lopez in the second round. Thurman mostly dominated the first part of the fight. Lopez, however, turned the tables in the second part of the fight, hurting and almost finish Thurman in the seventh. Lopez tried to finish the fight early but was unable to. While one of the judges had it a draw, 113-113, the two other judges saw Thurman as the clear winner, scoring the fight 117-109 and 115-111 in favor of the champion.

=== Lopez vs. Molina Jr. ===
On 28 September 2019, Lopez fought fellow veteran John Molina Jr. Lopez was ranked #8 by the WBC at welterweight. Lopez proved he has a lot more left in the tank, by dropping his opponent three times en route to a ninth round knockout.

=== Lopez vs. Santana ===
In his next fight, Lopez fought Francisco Santana. Lopez ended the fight early via a tenth round TKO.

== Professional boxing record ==
48 fights	38 wins	9 losses
By knockout	21	3
By decision	17	6
No contests	1	

No.	Result	Record	Opponent	Type	Round, time	Date	Location	Notes
48	Loss	38–9 (1)	Cody Crowley	UD	10	Apr 16, 2022	AT&T Stadium, Arlington, Texas, U.S.	
47	Win	38–8 (1)	Francisco Santana	TKO	10 (10), 1:22	Dec 5, 2020	AT&T Stadium, Arlington, Texas, U.S.	
46	Win	37–8 (1)	John Molina Jr.	TKO	8 (12), 0:39	Sep 28, 2019	Staples Center, Los Angeles, California, U.S.	
45	Loss	36–8 (1)	Keith Thurman	MD	12	Jan 26, 2019	Barclays Center, New York, City, New York, U.S.	For WBA (Super) welterweight title
44	Win	36–7 (1)	Miguel Cruz	UD	10	Apr 28, 2018	Don Haskins Center, El Paso, Texas, U.S.	
43	Win	35–7 (1)	Saul Corral	UD	10	Apr 9, 2017	The Novo at L.A. Live, Los Angeles, California, U.S.	
42	Win	34–7 (1)	Todd Manuel	UD	6	Dec 10, 2016	Galen Center, Los Angeles, California, U.S.	
41	Loss	33–7 (1)	Andre Berto	TKO	6 (12), 1:02	Mar 13, 2015	Citizens Business Bank Arena, Ontario, California, U.S.	For WBA interim welterweight title
40	Win	33–6 (1)	Rafael Cobos	UD	8	Sep 11, 2014	Hard Rock Hotel & Casino, Paradise, Nevada, U.S.	
39	Win	32–6 (1)	Aaron Martinez	TKO	5 (10), 1:19	Apr 24, 2014	Agua Caliente Casino, Rancho Mirage, California, U.S.	
38	Win	31–6 (1)	Mike Arnaoutis	TD	8 (10), 3:00	Dec 13, 2013	Fantasy Springs Resort Casino, Indio, California, U.S.	
37	Loss	30–6 (1)	Marcos Maidana	TKO	6 (12), 1:18	Jun 8, 2013	Home Depot Center, Carson, California, U.S.	For WBA Inter-Continental welterweight title
36	Loss	30–5 (1)	Canelo Álvarez	TKO	5 (12), 2:55	Sep 15, 2012	MGM Grand Garden Arena, Paradise, Nevada, U.S.	For WBC light middleweight title
35	Win	30–4 (1)	Victor Ortiz	RTD	9 (12), 3:00	Jun 23, 2012	Staples Center, Los Angeles, California, U.S.	Won vacant WBC silver welterweight title
34	Loss	29–4 (1)	Jessie Vargas	SD	10	Sep 17, 2011	MGM Grand Garden Arena, Paradise, Nevada, U.S.	
33	Win	29–3 (1)	Mike Dallas Jr.	KO	7 (10), 1:47	Jan 28, 2011	Pechanga Resort & Casino, Temecula, California, U.S.	Won vacant WBC-NABF light welterweight title
32	Win	28–3 (1)	Sergio Rivera	KO	3 (8), 2:58	Nov 12, 2010	Doubletree Hotel, Ontario, California, U.S.	
31	Win	27–3 (1)	Marvin Cordova Jr.	UD	8	Aug 13, 2010	Citizens Business Bank Arena, Ontario, California, U.S.	
30	Win	26–3 (1)	Anthony Mora	RTD	3 (8), 3:00	Sep 11, 2009	Doubletree Hotel, Ontario, California, U.S.	
29	Win	25–3 (1)	Sergio Joel De La Torre	UD	6	Aug 14, 2009	Omega Products International, Corona, California, U.S.	
28	Win	24–3 (1)	Patrick López	SD	8	Apr 17, 2009	Doubletree Hotel, Ontario, California, U.S.	
27	Win	23–3 (1)	Alex Perez	KO	2 (8), 2:36	Nov 29, 2008	Citizens Business Bank Arena, Ontario, California, U.S.	
26	Loss	22–3 (1)	Edgar Santana	MD	10	Apr 11, 2008	Miccosukee Indian Gaming Resort, Miami, Florida, U.S.	
25	Win	22–2 (1)	Tyrone Harris	UD	8	Nov 2, 2007	Emerald Queen Casino, Tacoma, Washington, U.S.	
24	Win	21–2 (1)	Luis Antonio Arceo	KO	6 (12), 1:46	Aug 18, 2007	Soboba Casino, San Jacinto, California, U.S.	
23	Win	20–2 (1)	Octavio Narvaez	UD	8	May 24, 2007	Marriott Hotel, Irvine, California, U.S.	
22	Win	19–2 (1)	Armando Córdoba	RTD	5 (8), 3:00	Feb 23, 2007	Doubletree Hotel, Ontario, California, U.S.	
21	Win	18–2 (1)	Adrian Navarrete	TKO	7 (8), 2:43	Nov 20, 2006	Doubletree Hotel, Ontario, California, U.S.	
20	Win	17–2 (1)	Anthony Martinez	TKO	7 (8), 0:25	Aug 18, 2006	Omega Products International, Corona, California, U.S.	
19	NC	16–2 (1)	Sammy Ventura	NC	1 (12), 0:21	Jul 14, 2006	Omega Products International, Corona, California, U.S.	Ventura unable to continue from accidental head butt
18	Loss	16–2	Wes Ferguson	SD	10	Apr 8, 2006	Thomas & Mack Center, Paradise, Nevada, U.S.	
17	Win	16–1	Gerardo Zayas	UD	10	Feb 17, 2006	Doubletree Hotel, Ontario, California, U.S.	
16	Win	15–1	Jose Luis Tula	UD	10	Sep 23, 2005	Omega Products International, Corona, California, U.S.	
15	Win	14–1	Leonardo Resendiz	TKO	5 (10), 2:59	Jul 29, 2005	Omega Products International, Corona, California, U.S.	
14	Win	13–1	Gilberto Sanchez Leon	UD	10	Apr 25, 2005	Doubletree Hotel, Ontario, California, U.S.	
13	Win	12–1	Mauricio Borquez	TKO	1 (6), 1:23	Feb 11, 2005	Doubletree Hotel, Ontario, California, U.S.	
12	Win	11–1	Ulises Pena	TKO	1 (8), 1:10	Oct 29, 2004	Doubletree Hotel, Ontario, California, U.S.	
11	Win	10–1	Mauricio Borquez	TKO	1 (6), 1:40	Aug 20, 2004	Omega Products International, Corona, California, U.S.	
10	Win	9–1	Juan Carlos Martinez	UD	6	Jul 22, 2004	Athletic Club, Los Angeles, California, U.S.	
9	Win	8–1	Oscar Villa	UD	6	Jun 11, 2004	Omega Products International, Corona, California, U.S.	
8	Win	7–1	Arturo Flores	TKO	5 (6), 2:05	Mar 22, 2004	Doubletree Hotel, Ontario, California, U.S.	
7	Win	6–1	Juan Suazo	UD	4	Jan 31, 2004	Dodge Theater, Phoenix, Arizona, U.S.	
6	Win	5–1	Antonio Wong	TKO	4 (4), 0:37	Dec 12, 2003	Edgewater Hotel and Casino, Laughlin, Nevada, U.S.	
5	Win	4–1	Tony Avila	TKO	1 (6), 1:01	Nov 1, 2003	Stardust Hotel & Casino, Paradise, Nevada, U.S.	
4	Win	3–1	Jose Cabanillas	TKO	4 (6), 0:42	Jul 11, 2003	City Center Pavilion, Reno, Nevada, U.S.	
3	Loss	2–1	Rodrigo Lopez	UD	4	Mar 28, 2003	Orleans Hotel & Casino, Paradise, Nevada, U.S.	
2	Win	2–0	Marco Antonio Contreras	UD	4	Feb 21, 2003	Palace Indian Gaming Center, Lemoore, California, U.S.	
1	Win	1–0	Allen Litzau	TKO	1 (4), 0:53	Feb 8, 2003	Mandalay Bay Events Center, Paradise, Nevada, U.S.	Professional debut

== See also ==
- List of current NABF Champions
