= Amir Khan vs. Lamont Peterson =

Boxing competition

Capital Showdown
- Date: 10 December 2011
- Venue: Convention Center, Washington, D.C.
- Title(s) on the line: WBA and IBF Light Welterweight championships

Tale of the tape
Boxer	(United Kingdom) Amir Khan	(United States) Lamont Peterson
Nickname	"King"	"Havoc"
Hometown	Bolton, Greater Manchester	Washington, District of Columbia
Purse	$1,100,000	$650,000
Pre-fight record	26–1 (18 KO)	29–1–1 (15 KO)
Age	25 years	27 years, 10 months
Height	5 ft 8 1/2 in (174 cm)	5 ft 9 in (175 cm)
Weight	139 lb (63 kg)	140 lb (64 kg)
Style	Orthodox	Orthodox
Recognition	WBA and IBF; Light Welterweight Champion; The Ring; No. 1 Ranked Light Welterweight	IBF; No. 1 Ranked Light Welterweight; WBA; No. 12 Ranked Light Welterweight; The Ring; No. 6 Ranked Light Welterweight

Result
- Peterson defeats Khan via split decision

Amir Khan vs Lamont Peterson, billed as Capital Showdown, was a boxing match for Khan's WBA (Super) & IBF light welterweight titles. The fight took place in the Convention Center in Washington, D.C., United States, on 10 December 2011. Khan was making the first defense of his IBF belt against his mandatory challenger.

== Background ==
Golden Boy Promotions CEO Richard Schaefer announced in a conference in London to officially kick off "Capital Showdown: Khan vs. Peterson".

The tour touts an HBO-televised bout featuring WBA (Super) & IBF light welterweight champion Amir Khan of Bolton, England, in the first defense of his IBF belt against mandatory challenger Lamont Peterson of Washington, D.C., which was slated for December 10 in Peterson's home town.

Khan had won eight consecutive fights, four of them by knockout. Peterson won an IBF eliminator with a 12th-round stoppage of Victor Cayo (26-2, 18 KOs) in July, earning the organization's No. 1 contender status and the right to challenge Khan.

== The fight ==
The fight was fought in front of a packed house at the Convention Center, with an announced audience of 8,647. After an extremely close, evenly matched fight for 12 rounds, the heavily pro-Peterson crowd was thrilled by the split decision announced in Peterson's favor. Khan scored a knockdown in the first round, but was penalized twice by referee Joe Cooper, once for excessive shoving with the forearm and later for hitting on the break. The points proved to be the difference between the two scorecards that favored Peterson.

HBO's unofficial scorer Harold Lederman had Khan the winner 113–112 while ESPN had it 114–111 for Khan.

== Aftermath ==
=== Controversy ===
After the bout Khan, complained about the referee and made accusations of impropriety that the judges' scorecards had been "interfered with" by a man at ringside who celebrated with Peterson after the decision. This man was later identified as Mustafa Ameen, a figure affiliated with the IBF but who had no apparent reason to be involved. Khan's camp launched an appeal with the IBF in December, principally on the grounds of "miscalculation of the scoring," and "inappropriate conduct by officials" and in January 2012, after reviewing the evidence, the WBA ordered a rematch.

Despite rumours, on 3 March 2012, the WBA did not reinstate Khan as the WBA Super Light-welterweight Champion.

However, on 8 May 2012, it emerged that Peterson failed a drug test, testing positive for a banned substance thought to be synthetic testosterone. The Nevada Athletic Commission denied Peterson a licence to box, and the fight was cancelled. The WBA reinstated Khan as champion, although the IBF did not.

== Main card ==
Confirmed bouts:

=== Televised ===
- Super Lightweight Championship bout: (United Kingdom) Amir Khan vs. (United States) Lamont Peterson
  - Peterson defeats Khan via split decision. (113-112, 113-112, 110-115)
- Heavyweight bout: (United States) Seth Mitchell vs. (Uzbekistan) Timur Ibragimov
  - Mitchell defeats Ibragimov by TKO at 2:48 of round 2.

=== Untelevised ===
- Light Welterweight bout: (United States) Anthony Peterson vs. (Nigeria) Daniel Attah
  - Peterson defeats Attah via unanimous decision.
- Super Middleweight bout: (Dominican Republic) Fernando Guerrero vs. (United States) Robert Kliewer
  - Guerrero defeats Kliewer by TKO at 0:45 of round 5.
- Lightweight bout: (Republic of Ireland) Jamie Kavanagh vs. (Dominican Republic) Ramesis Gil
  - Fight ends in a majority decision.
- Welterweight bout: (United States) Dusty Harrison vs. (United States) Terrell Davis
  - Harrison defeats Davis by KO of round 1.
- Light Heavyweight bout: (United States) Thomas Williams Jr. vs. (Puerto Rico) Reynaldo Rodriguez
- Lightweight bout: (United States) Terron Grant vs. (United States) Dashawn Autry
  - Grant defeats Autry by KO of round 1.
- Lightweight bout: (United States) Joshua Davis vs. (United States) Christopher Russell
  - Davis defeats Russell via unanimous decision.

== International broadcasting ==
Country	Broadcaster
Australia	Main Event
Czech Republic	Sport 1
France	Canal+
Hungary	Sport 2
Indonesia	tvOne
Italy	Sportitalia
Malaysia	Astro
New Zealand	Sky
Pakistan	Geo TV
Philippines	AKTV
Poland	Polsat Sport
Portugal	Sport TV
Romania	Sport.ro
Qatar	Al Jazeera Sports
Russia	NTV Plus
South Africa	SuperSport
United Kingdom	Sky Sports
United States	HBO

Preceded by vs. Zab Judah	Amir Khan's bouts 17 September 2011	Succeeded by vs. Danny Garcia
Preceded by vs. Victor Manuel Cayo	Lamont Peterson's bouts 10 December 2011	Succeeded by vs. Kendall Holt
