= Cletus Seldin =

American boxer (born 1986)

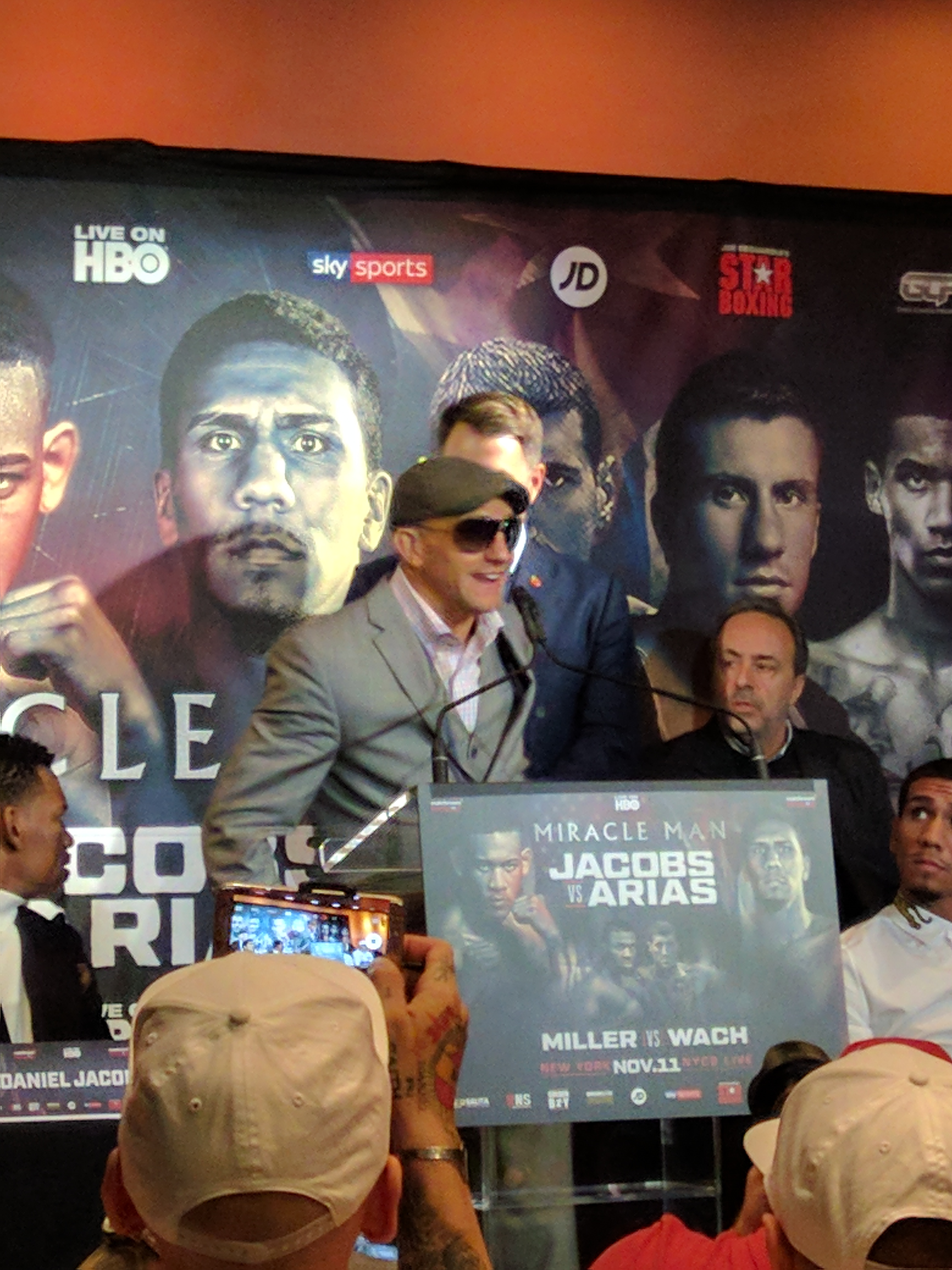
- Seldin in 2017

Personal information
- Nickname: The Hebrew Hammer
- Born: September 11, 1986 (age 40) East Yaphank, New York, U.S.
- Height: 5 ft 7 in (170 cm)
- Weight: Light Welterweight; Welterweight

Boxing career
- Reach: 67 in (170 cm)
- Stance: Orthodox

Boxing record
- Total fights: 31
- Wins: 29
- Win by KO: 23
- Losses: 1
- No contests: 1

Cletus Seldin (born September 11, 1986) is an American professional boxer.

== Early life ==
Seldin was born in East Yaphank, New York (part of Shirley, New York, on Long Island). He is Jewish. He was named after former New York Yankee third baseman Clete Boyer, who was a close friend of his grandparents. He grew up in Shirley. His father is Harry Seldin. His grandfather Lee Seldin headed a motorcycle club, the Dragons, in Bedford Stuyvesant in Brooklyn, New York, during the 1950s.

At Longwood High School in Middle Island, New York, Seldin played cornerback and wide receiver on the Longwood Lions football team, which won the 2004 Long Island championship. He also wrestled and learned jiu jitsu. In his senior year he set the New York State deadlifting record for men weighing up to 145 pounds (66 kg), by lifting 470 pounds (210 kg). He later studied at Suffolk Community College.

== Boxing career ==
Seldin's nickname is the Hebrew Hammer. He is trained and managed by Pete Brodsky, and promoted by Joe DeGuardia.

Seldin wears a Star of David on his trunks, as did former Jewish boxers Benny Leonard and Barney Ross. "Remember the Masada", a reference to the legendary mass suicide of Jewish rebels under siege by Romans in AD 74, is stitched on the back of his jacket. He describes his style as "come forward and fight." ESPN boxing writer Dan Rafeal described him as "a fun fighter."

Seldin began boxing as a professional in 2011, when he was 25 years old.

In April 2013, he had surgery for a torn right rotator cuff, labrum, and right hand. That was followed by nine months of recovery time.

Seldin made his national television debut in July 2014 on ESPN against Bayan "the Mongolian Mongoose" Jargal (17–5–3, 11 knockouts) at the Paramount Theatre in Huntington, Long Island, New York. The fight ended as a "no-contest" in the third round, as the ringside physician called the fight when Seldin head butted Jargal and caused a badly swollen-shut right eye.

In December 2014, he again faced Jargal. Seldin defeated him by a technical knockout in the ninth round, winning the World Boxing Council International Silver Light Welterweight (140 pounds (64 kg)) title.

He won with a technical knockout against Johnny Garcia (19–2–1, 11 KOs) on ESPN's Friday Night Fights on February 27, 2015, headlining as the main event in a fight for Seldin's WBC title. The referee stopped the fight in the fifth round. Seldin brought his record to 16–0, with 13 knockouts, including knockouts in 12 of his last 13 fights.

On June 20, 2015, Seldin defended his WBC International Silver junior welterweight title and brought his record to 17–0 with 14 knockouts, with a 4th-round main event TKO of Ranee Ganoy, who was 38-13-2 with 32 knockouts, at The Paramount.

On April 6, 2017, Seldin tested positive for anabolic steroid use for a second time showing an increased level of testosterone and anabolic steroid Stanozolol also known as Winstrol, which forced his June 15 fight to be canceled. His testosterone to epitestosterone ratio (T/E) was 21.02 to 1, which far exceeded the allowable threshold of 4 to 1 under World Anti-Doping Agency standards. The WBC ruled that Seldin was suspended from participating in any WBC-sanctioned bouts for six months, or until Aug. 1, 2017, and that VADA would design a specific random testing protocol for Seldin at his own cost that would go on for one year.

On November 11, 2017, Seldin made his HBO Boxing debut fighting and winning in a third-round TKO against Roberto Ortiz, resulting in Ortiz's second-ever loss. Seldin's record improved to 21–0 with 17 knockouts.

He is the reigning Super Lightweight Champion of the North American Boxing Association; in 2020 he broke his own record by winning 25 of 26 fights, with 21 knockouts, when he fought Luis Florez.

On October 16, 2021, in the main event at TrillerVerz at Barclays Center in Brooklyn, NY, he knocked out Brazil's Willam Silva in the seventh round.

== Personal life ==
Seldin resides on Long Island. In 2026, Seldin was inducted into the National Jewish Sports Hall of Fame and Museum.

== Professional boxing record ==
29 fights	27 wins	1 loss
By knockout	23	0
By decision	4	1
No contests	1	

No.	Result	Record	Opponent	Type	Round, time	Date	Location	Notes
31	Win	29–1 (1)	(Colombia) Yeis Gabriel Solano	MD	8	Mar 16, 2025	(United States) Madison Square Garden, New York City, New York, U.S.	
30	Win	28–1 (1)	(Ecuador) Jose Angulo	MD	8	Mar 15, 2024	(United States) Madison Square Garden, New York City, New York, U.S.	
29	Win	27-1 (1)	(Ghana) Patrick Okine	TKO	6 (8), 2:22	Oct 10, 2023	(United States) Sony Hall, New York City, New York U.S.	
28	Win	26–1 (1)	(Brazil) William Silva	KO	7 (10), 0:24	Oct 16, 2021	(United States) Barclays Center, New York City, New York, U.S.	Retained WBA-NABA super lightweight title
27	Win	25–1 (1)	(Colombia) Humberto Martinez	TKO	7 (12), 3:00	Feb 28, 2020	(United States) Paramount Theatre, Huntington, New York, U.S.	Retained WBA-NABA super lightweight title
26	Win	24–1 (1)	(United States) Zab Judah	TKO	11 (12), 1:40	Jun 7, 2019	(United States) Turning Stone Resort & Casino, Verona, New York, U.S.	Won vacant WBA-NABA super lightweight title
25	Win	23–1 (1)	(Hungary) Adam Mate	KO	1 (10), 1:00	Jan 26, 2019	(United States) Mohegan Sun Casino, Uncasville, Connecticut, U.S.	
24	Win	22–1 (1)	(Nicaragua) Nelson Lara	KO	1 (10), 2:55	Nov 16, 2018	(United States) Chesapeake Energy Arena, Oklahoma City, Oklahoma, U.S.	
23	Loss	21–1 (1)	(Canada) Yves Ulysse Jr.	UD	10	Dec 16, 2017	Place Bell, Labal, Canada	
22	Win	21–0 (1)	(Mexico) Roberto Ortiz	TKO	3 (10), 1:47	Nov 11, 2017	(United States) Nassau Coliseum, Uniondale, New York, U.S.	
21	Win	20–0 (1)	(France) Renald Garrido	UD	10	Sep 28, 2017	(United States) Paramount Theatre, Huntington, New York, U.S.	
20	Win	19–0 (1)	(United States) Jesus Selig	KO	1 (10), 2:11	Jun 17, 2016	(United States) Paramount Theatre, Huntington, New York, U.S.	
19	Win	18–0 (1)	(Puerto Rico) Orlando Vazquez	KO	1 (10), 2:34	Mar 5, 2016	(United States) Paramount Theatre, Huntington, New York, U.S.	Retained WBC International Silver super lightweight title
18	Win	17–0 (1)	(Philippines) Ranee Ganoy	TKO	4 (10), 0:32	Jun 19, 2015	(United States) Paramount Theatre, Huntington, New York, U.S.	Retained WBC International Silver super lightweight title
17	Win	16–0 (1)	(United States) Johnny Garcia	TKO	5 (10), 3:00	Feb 27, 2015	(United States) Paramount Theatre, Huntington, New York, U.S.	Retained WBC International Silver super lightweight title
16	Win	15–0 (1)	(Mongolia) Bayan Jargal	TKO	9 (10), 0:30	Dec 20, 2014	(United States) Paramount Theatre, Huntington, New York, U.S.	Won vacant WBC International Silver super lightweight title
15	Win	14–0 (1)	(Dominican Republic) Ramesis Gil	KO	2 (10), 2:06	Sep 19, 2014	(United States) Paramount Theatre, Huntington, New York, U.S.	
14	NC	13–0 (1)	(Mongolia) Bayan Jargal	NC	3 (8), 2:08	Jul 18, 2014	(United States) Paramount Theatre, Huntington, New York, U.S.	
13	Win	13–0	(Nicaragua) Wilfredo Acuna	TKO	7 (8), 1:12	Apr 24, 2014	(United States) Paramount Theatre, Huntington, New York, U.S.	
12	Win	12–0	(United States) Gilbert Venegas	UD	8	Nov 22, 2013	(United States) Paramount Theatre, Huntington, New York, U.S.	
11	Win	11–0	(United States) Jonathan Cuba	KO	3 (8), 2:22	Feb 23, 2013	(United States) Paramount Theatre, Huntington, New York, U.S.	
10	Win	10–0	(Puerto Rico) Luis Rodriguez	TKO	3 (6), 0:05	Jan 25, 2013	(United States) Paramount Theatre, Huntington, New York, U.S.	
9	Win	9–0	(United States) Carl McNickles	TKO	2 (8), 2:45	Oct 13, 2012	(United States) NYCB Theatre at Westbury, Jericho, New York, U.S.	
8	Win	8–0	(Puerto Rico) Jonathan Garcia	KO	1 (6), 2:33	Jul 28, 2012	(United States) Paramount Theatre, Huntington, New York, U.S.	
7	Win	7–0	(United States) Marcus Hall	TKO	2 (6), 2:57	Mar 31, 2012	(United States) Paramount Theatre, Huntington, New York, U.S.	
6	Win	6–0	(United States) Tyler Pogline	KO	1 (6), 3:00	Jan 28, 2012	(United States) Paramount Theatre, Huntington, New York, U.S.	
5	Win	5–0	(United States) Rashad Bogar	TKO	3 (6), 1:58	Nov 19, 2011	(United States) Paramount Theatre, Huntington, New York, U.S.	
4	Win	4–0	(United States) Jose Segura Torres	TKO	2 (4), 0:21	Oct 22, 2011	(United States) Madison Square Garden WaMu Theater, New York City, New York, U.S.	
3	Win	3–0	(United States) Clarence Booth	UD	4	Sep 23, 2011	(United States) Seminole Hard Rock Hotel and Casino, Hollywood, Florida, U.S.	
2	Win	2–0	(United States) Hector Rivera	UD	4	Jul 20, 2011	(United States) Oceana, New York City, New York, U.S.	
1	Win	1–0	(United States) Wilson Feliciano	TKO	3 (4), 0:17	Jul 9, 2011	(United States) Seminole Hard Rock Hotel and Casino, Hollywood, Florida, U.S.	

== See also ==
- List of select Jewish boxers
