= Roberto Ortiz (boxer) =

Mexican boxer (born 1985)

Personal information
- Nickname: Massa
- Born: Roberto Ortiz Cervantes; 8 December 1985 (age 40) Torreón, Coahuila, Mexico
- Height: 1.75 m (5 ft 9 in)
- Weight: Welterweight; Light Welterweight

Boxing career
- Reach: 177 cm (70 in)
- Stance: Orthodox

Boxing record
- Total fights: 42
- Wins: 35
- Win by KO: 26
- Losses: 5
- Draws: 2
- No contests: 0

Roberto Ortiz Cervantes (born 8 December 1985) is a Mexican boxer.

== Professional career ==
In October 2010, Ortiz beat veteran Salvador Carreón to win the WBA Fedecaribe light welterweight title.

On 26 June 2011 Roberto upset undefeated Antonio Lozada, Jr. to win the WBC Silver light welterweight title. He kept the title until 6 September 2014, when he lost for the first time in his professional career against Argentinian pugilist Lucas Matthysse. The fight was staged in the U.S. Bank Arena of Cincinnati, Ohio, and the Mexican was knockout in the second round.

=== Professional record ===
35 Wins (26 knockouts), 5 Losses, 2 Draws
Res.	Record	Opponent	Type	Rd., Time	Date	Location	Notes
Loss	35-4-2	(United States) Vergil Ortiz Jr.	TKO	2 (10)	2018-09-15	(United States) T-Mobile Arena, Las Vegas, USA	
Loss	35-3-2	(Mexico) Jose Eduardo Lopez Rodriguez	MD	10	2018-06-16	Auditorio Centenario, Gomez Palacio, Mexico	
Loss	35-2-2	(United States) Cletus Seldin	TKO	3 (10)	2017-11-11	(United States) Nassau Coliseum, Uniondale, USA	
Draw	35-1-2	(Mexico) Diego Cruz	PTS	12	2017-07-01	Auditorio Centenario, Gomez Palacio, Mexico	For vacant WBC FECARBOX welterweight title
Win	35-1-1	(Mexico) Jose Guadalupe Rosales	UD	8	2017-04-08	Oasis Hotel Complex, Cancun, Mexico	
Win	34-1-1	(Colombia) Pascual Salgado	TKO	4 (10)	2016-03-18	Oasis Hotel Complex, Cancun, Mexico	
Win	33-1-1	(Mexico) Nestor Fernando Garcia	TKO	9 (10)	2015-11-27	Sindicato de Taxistas, Cancun, Mexico	
Win	32-1-1	(Mexico) Juan Jesus Rivera	UD	10	2015-04-24	Foro Polanco, Mexico City, Distrito Federal, Mexico	
Loss	31-1-1	(Argentina) Lucas Matthysse	KO	2 (12)	2014-09-06	(United States) U.S. Bank Arena, Cincinnati, Ohio, USA	Lost WBC Silver super lightweight title
Win	31-0-1	(Mexico) Ramiro Alcaraz	TKO	5 (12)	2014-04-12	Oasis Hotel Complex, Cancun, Quintana Roo, Mexico	
Win	30-0-1	(Mexico) Reyes Sanchez	UD	12	2013-10-19	Deportivo Morelos, Cuajimalpa, Distrito Federal, Mexico	
Win	29-0-1	(Mexico) Jorge Romero	TKO	10 (12)	2013-06-15	Park Nave 1, Villahermosa, Tabasco, Mexico	
Win	28-0-1	(Colombia) Fidel Muñoz	TD	6 (12)	2013-02-16	Domo Deportivo, Tulum, Quintana Roo, Mexico	
Win	27-0-1	(Mexico) John Carlo Aparicio	UD	12	2012-10-27	Centro Internacional de Convenciones, Chetumal, Quintana Roo, Mexico	

Achievements
Vacant Title last held by Érik Morales	WBC Light Welterweight Champion; Silver title 25 June 2011 – 6 August 2014	Succeeded by Lucas Matthysse
