= Statehouse Convention Center =

Convention center in Little Rock, Arkansas

Coordinates: 34°44′54″N 92°16′11″W

- Interactive map of Statehouse Convention Center
- Location: Little Rock, Arkansas
- Operator: Little Rock Convention and Visitors Bureau
- Capacity: 4,600

Tenants
- Arkansas-Little Rock Trojans (NCAA) (alternate, 1999–2005)

The Statehouse Convention Center is a convention center located in downtown Little Rock, Arkansas, U.S., containing approximately 220,000 square feet (20,000 m^{2}) of space.

A 650-space parking deck is located only one block south of the convention center.

== See also ==
- List of convention centers in the United States
