= D.C. Armory =

Armory and arena in Washington, D.C.

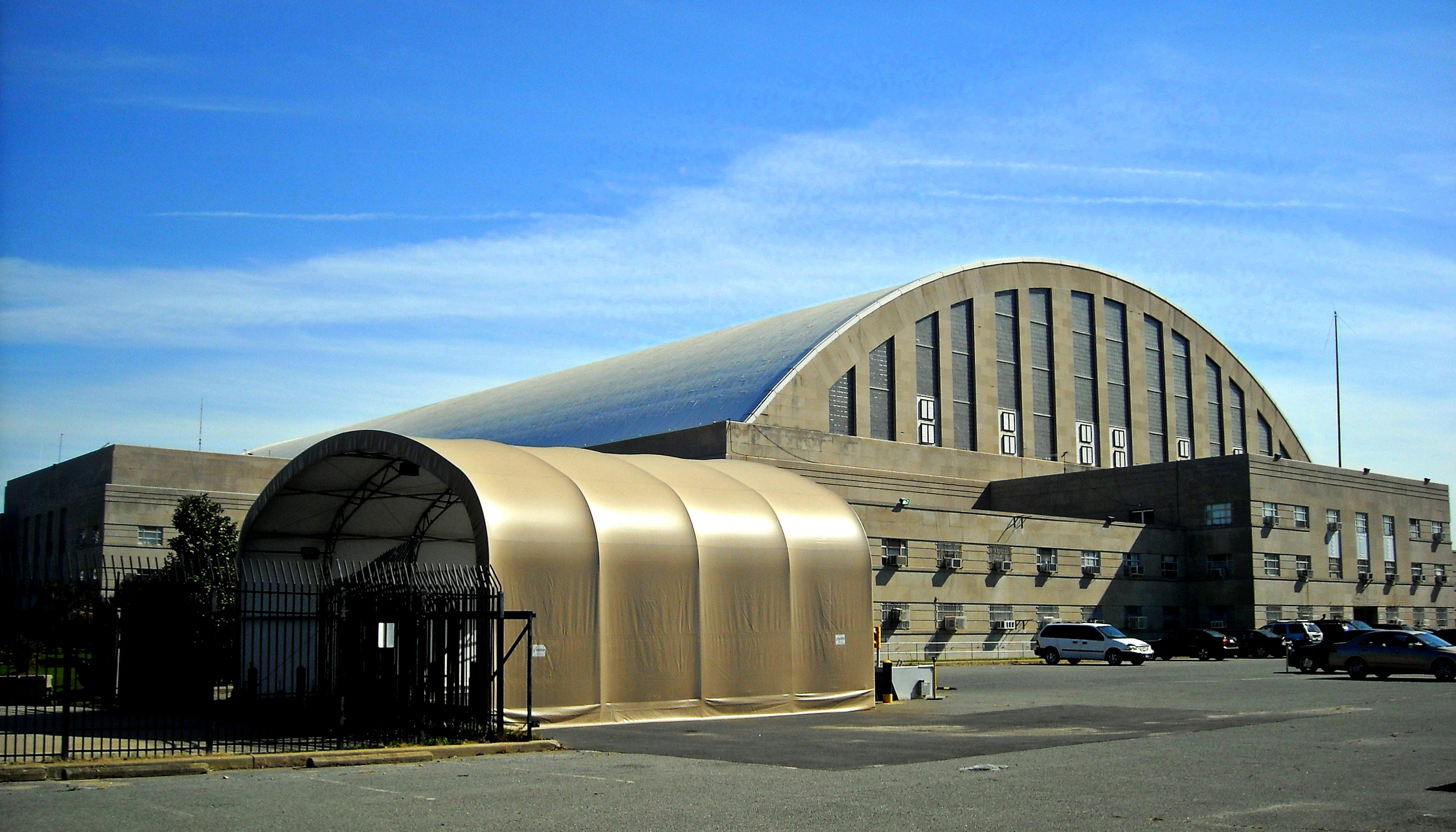
- Interactive map of D.C. Armory
- Address: 2001 East Capitol Street SE
- Location: Washington, D.C.
- Coordinates: 38.8885°N 76.9755°W
- Owner: United States
- Operator: Military – District of Columbia National Guard (Note: " The parts of the Armory so set aside for the use of the National Guard shall be under the control and jurisdiction of the Commanding General of the National Guard [of the District of Columbia] for all purposes except maintenance and repair of the Armory."); Nonmilitary – Events DC
- Capacity: 10,000

Construction
- Opened: 1941

Tenants
- Georgetown Hoyas (NCAA) (1947–1949); Washington Diplomats (NASL) (1978); D.C. Armor (AIFA) (2009); DC Rollergirls (WFTDA) (2008–present)

The D.C. Armory is a mixed armory and 10,000-seat arena in Washington, D.C. Managed by the Events DC, the Armory opened in 1941, as the headquarters, armory, and training facility for the District of Columbia National Guard. In 1994, it became a venue for a broad range of sports and public events. The Armory is adjacent to Stadium–Armory station and the former RFK Stadium and future New Stadium at RFK Campus.

== About ==
D.C. National Guard soldiers at the D.C. Armory's basketball court.

Prior to its construction, the Convention Hall located on 5th Street NW, between K and L had been used as an armory. Construction on the new armory began on June 2, 1940, and it opened on July 13, 1941. The structure was designed by the city's Municipal Architect, Nathan C. Wyeth. The D.C. Armory replaced the National Armory, a 1910 structure which was designed by New York City architect Electus D. Litchfield.

OPLAN 1954, a 1954 war game preparing for an atomic bomb exploding over Washington, D.C., supposed that a vacant parking lot near the Armory could be turned into an emergency airstrip for delivering medical supplies. Initially, nonmilitary use of the Armory was facilitated by the D.C. Armory Board, which was formed in 1948. During its existence the board oversaw the use of both the Armory and RFK Stadium. In 1994 the board was dissolved and the city's use of the Armory came under the authority of the D.C. Sports and Entertainment Commission (DCSEC), which later became the Washington Convention and Sports Authority.

The Armory is served by Stadium–Armory station on the Blue, Orange, and Silver Lines of the Washington Metro. The Armory shared a car parking lot with the defunct Robert F. Kennedy Memorial Stadium (RFK Stadium).

== Events ==
The Armory's Drill Field is approximately 80,000 square feet (7,400 m^{2}) and has hosted trade shows, concerts, warehouse sales, the Washington Auto Show, sporting events, and Presidential inauguration balls.

The Washington Diplomats played indoor soccer at the armory in 1978. The armory has hosted the WCW Capital Combat professional wrestling event in 1990, served as a preliminary tryout venue for American Idol, been a concert venue for Marilyn Manson, and hosted the Longest Yard Football Classic, a charity game pitting Members of Congress (aided by former NFL stars) against the Capitol Police. In 2007, the first sanctioned pro mixed martial arts event in Washington, D.C. was held at the armory.

The Armory has been home to the DC Rollergirls, D.C.'s female flat track roller derby league, since February 2008. In 2009, the Armory became home to the D.C. Armor, an American Indoor Football Association team. Popular Dutch trance artist Armin van Buuren played a six-hour set at the Armory in 2011. In 2013, facility hosted the IBF Junior Welterweight title fight featuring Lamont Peterson and Kendall Holt.

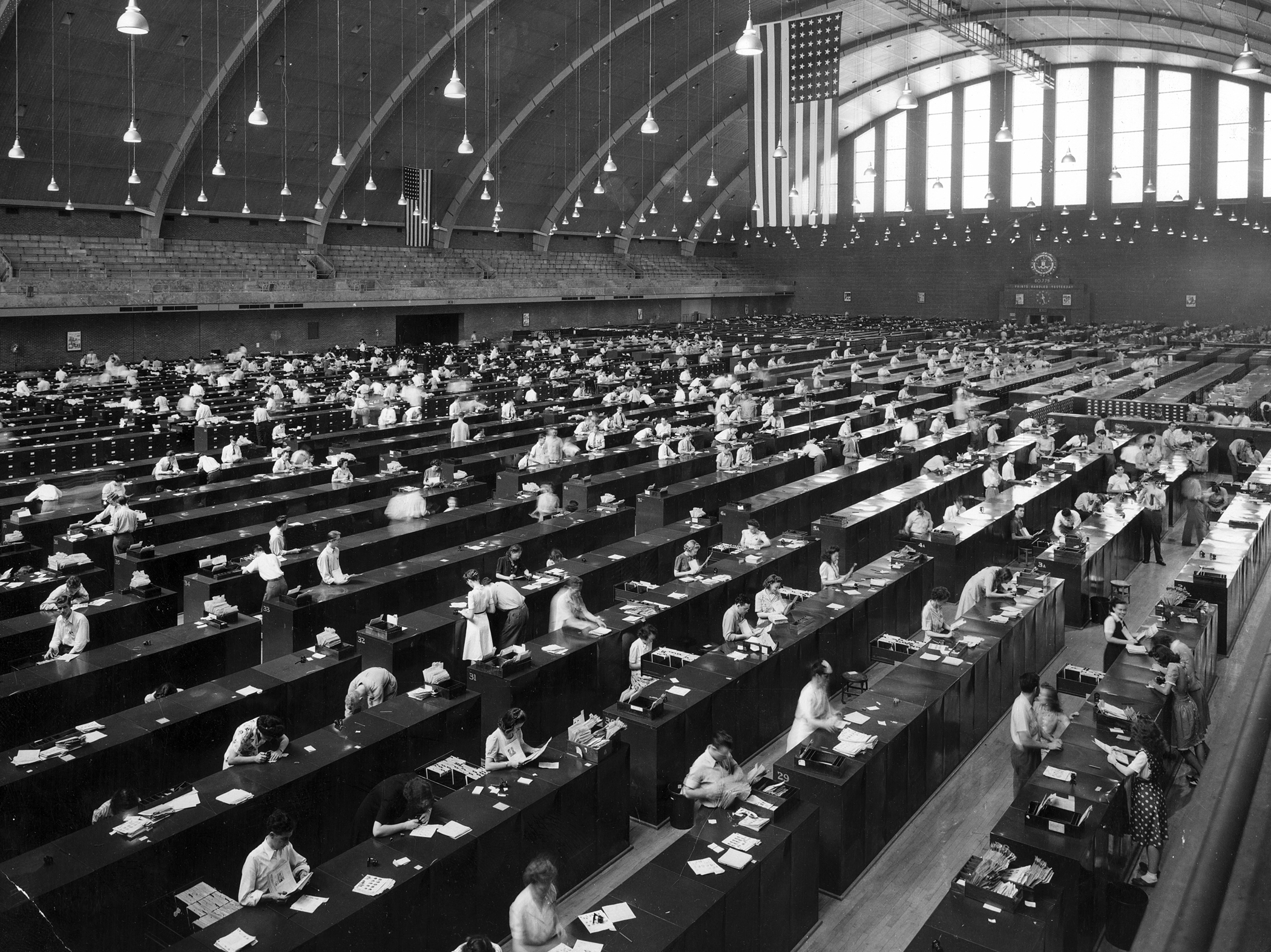
The armory hosting an FBI fingerprinting division, 1945

During World War II, the Armory was used by the FBI Identification Division to house fingerprint records. Inauguration balls spanning from the presidencies of Harry S. Truman to Barack Obama have also been hosted at the Armory. Frank Sinatra and Peter Lawford produced President Kennedy's pre-inaugural gala at the Armory on January 19, 1961. The cast of performers included Harry Belafonte, Milton Berle, Leonard Bernstein, Joey Bishop, Nat King Cole, Tony Curtis, Jimmy Durante, Ella Fitzgerald, Gene Kelly, Alan King, Janet Leigh, Ethel Merman, Louis Prima, Keely Smith, Pat Suzuki, and Helen Traubel.

== Bibliography ==
- Benedetto, Robert; Du Vall, Kathleen; Donovan, Jane (2001). Historical Dictionary of Washington, D.C. Lanham, Md.: Scarecrow Press. ISBN 9780810840942.
- Scott, Pamela; Lee, Antoinette Josephine (1993). Buildings of the District of Columbia. New York: Oxford University Press. ISBN 9780195061468.
