= José Benavidez Jr. =

American boxer (born 1992)

Personal information
- Born: José Luis Benavidez Jr. May 15, 1992 (age 34) Panorama City, California, U.S.
- Height: 5 ft 10 1/2 in (179 cm)
- Weight: Light welterweight; Welterweight; Light middleweight; Middleweight

Boxing career
- Reach: 71 in (180 cm)
- Stance: Orthodox

Boxing record
- Total fights: 33
- Wins: 28
- Win by KO: 19
- Losses: 3
- Draws: 1
- No contests: 1

José Luis Benavidez Jr. (born May 15, 1992) is an American professional boxer who challenged for the WBO welterweight title in 2018 and previously held the WBA interim light-welterweight world title. He is the brother of two-time WBC super middleweight champion and current WBA and WBO Cruiserweight champion David Benavidez. He also made his acting debut as Felix Chavez in Creed III (2023).

== Early life ==
Benavidez was born in Panorama City, California and is of Mexican and Ecuadorian descent. His younger brother, David Benavidez, is also a professional boxer. In August 2016, he was shot in Phoenix while walking his dog.

== Amateur career ==
Benavidez Jr. was an eleven time national champion, which include the Silver Gloves twice, qualifying for the Junior Olympics and earning a spot on the U.S. National Team,. His final amateur record was 120–5. Benavidez is also the 2009 National Golden Gloves Champion in the light welterweight division, making him the youngest ever Golden Gloves Champion at only sixteen years old. He then reached the USA Boxing National Championship's title fight in Denver by beating the 2010 National Golden Gloves Champion Gary Allen Russell. He would lose the final on points 11–9 to Frankie Gómez.

== Professional career ==
=== Benavidez Jr vs. Crawford ===
On 13 October 2018, Benavidez Jr fought the unbeaten Terence Crawford for his WBO welterweight title, in what was the first title fight of his career. Benavidez Jr put up a good fight, but was ultimately overmatched by Crawford and lost the bout via TKO in the final round.

=== Benavidez Jr vs. Torres ===
In his next bout, Benavidez Jr fought Francisco Emanuel Torres. The bout ended in a majority draw, with one judge seeing Benavidez Jr as the winner, scoring it 96–94, while the other two scored it 95–95.

=== Benavidez Jr vs. Garcia ===
In his next bout, Benavidez Jr fought former champion and WBC #5 super welterweight Danny Garcia. Garcia beat Jose Benavidez by majority decision, with the scorecards announced as 116–112, 117–111, 114–114 in favor of Garcia.

=== Comeback and drugs ban ===
In his first fight since November 2023, Benavidez Jr knocked out Danny Rosenberger in the fifth of their scheduled eight-round bout at the T-Mobile Arena in Las Vegas on 1 February 2025. However, the result was changed to a no contest in June 2025, when he was given a backdated nine-month suspension and fined $3,750 after his post-fight drugs test came back positive for banned substance Benzoylecgonine.

== Professional boxing record ==
33 fights	28 wins	3 losses
By knockout	19	1
By decision	9	2
Draws	1	
No contests	1	

No.	Result	Record	Opponent	Type	Round, time	Date	Location	Notes
33	NC	28–3–1 (1)	Danny Rosenberger	NC	5 (8), 2:39	Feb 1, 2025	T-Mobile Arena, Las Vegas, Nevada, U.S.	Benavidez Jr originally won the fight by knockout but the result was changed to a no contest after he failed a drug test
32	Loss	28–3–1	Jermall Charlo	UD	10	Nov 25, 2023	Michelob Ultra Arena, Paradise, Nevada, U.S.	
31	Win	28–2–1	Sladan Janjanin	TKO	5 (10)	Aug 12, 2023	MGM National Harbor, National Harbor, Maryland, U.S.	
30	Loss	27–2–1	Danny Garcia	MD	12	Jul 30, 2022	Barclays Center, New York City, New York, U.S.	
29	Draw	27–1–1	Francisco Emanuel Torres	MD	10	Nov 13, 2021	Footprint Center, Phoenix, Arizona, U.S.	
28	Loss	27–1	Terence Crawford	TKO	12 (12), 2:42	Oct 13, 2018	CHI Health Center, Omaha, Nebraska, U.S.	For WBO welterweight title
27	Win	27–0	Frank Rojas	KO	1 (10), 0:21	Jun 9, 2018	MGM Grand Garden Arena, Paradise, Nevada, U.S.	
26	Win	26–0	Matthew Strode	TKO	8 (8), 2:58	Feb 3, 2018	American Bank Center, Corpus Christi, Texas, U.S.	
25	Win	25–0	Francisco Santana	UD	10	Jul 23, 2016	MGM Grand Garden Arena, Paradise, Nevada, U.S.	
24	Win	24–0	Sidney Siqueira	UD	10	Dec 12, 2015	Convention Center, Tucson, Arizona, U.S.	
23	Win	23–0	Jorge Páez Jr.	TKO	12 (12), 0:07	May 15, 2015	US Airway Centre, Phoenix, Arizona, U.S.	Retained WBA interim light welterweight title
22	Win	22–0	Mauricio Herrera	UD	12	Dec 13, 2014	The Cosmopolitan of Las Vegas, Paradise, Nevada, U.S.	Won WBA interim light welterweight title
21	Win	21–0	Henry Auraad	TKO	1 (8), 1:50	Jul 26, 2014	Celebrity Theater, Phoenix, Arizona, U.S.	Won vacant NABF light welterweight title
20	Win	20–0	Angel Hernandez	UD	6	May 17, 2014	Selland Arena, Fresno, California, U.S.	
19	Win	19–0	Prince Doku Jr.	UD	6	Mar 29, 2014	Texas Station, North Las Vegas, Nevada, U.S.	
18	Win	18–0	Abraham Álvarez	TKO	2 (6), 1:03	Nov 16, 2013	Avi Resort & Casino, Laughlin, Nevada, U.S.	
17	Win	17–0	Pavel Míranda	UD	8	Oct 13, 2012	The Home Depot Center, Carson, California, U.S.	
16	Win	16–0	Javier Loya	TKO	4 (1:41)	Jul 21, 2012	Texas Station, North Las Vegas, Nevada, U.S.	
15	Win	15–0	Josh Sosa	UD	6	May 26, 2012	Casino Del Sol, Tucson, Arizona, U.S.	
14	Win	14–0	Samuel Santana	UD	6	Nov 12, 2011	MGM Grand Garden Arena, Paradise, Nevada, U.S.	
13	Win	13–0	Dedrick Bell	KO	1 (6), 1:29	Sep 17, 2011	BlueWater Resort & Casino, Parker, Arizona, U.S.	
12	Win	12–0	Corey Alarcon	TKO	4 (6), 1:02	Jun 11, 2011	Wild Horse Pass Casino, Chandler, Arizona, U.S.	
11	Win	11–0	James Hope	TKO	5 (6), 1:43	May 7, 2011	MGM Grand Garden Arena, Paradise, Nevada, U.S.	
10	Win	10–0	Fernando Rodríguez	UD	6	Jan 22, 2011	Texas Station, North Las Vegas, Nevada, U.S.	
9	Win	9–0	Winston Mathis	TKO	3 (6), 2:23	Nov 13, 2010	Cowboys Stadium, Arlington, Texas, U.S.	
8	Win	8–0	Manuel Delcid	TKO	2 (6), 2:41	Sep 11, 2010	Palms Casino Resort, Paradise, Nevada, U.S.	
7	Win	7–0	Josh Beeman	KO	1 (4), 1:20	Jun 26, 2010	Alamodome, San Antonio, Texas, U.S.	
6	Win	6–0	Ronnie Peterson	TKO	1 (4), 2:46	May 29, 2010	UIC Pavilion, Chicago, Illinois, U.S.	
5	Win	5–0	Arnoldo Pacheco	TKO	1 (4)	May 8, 2010	La Feria de San Marcos, Aguascalientes, Aguascalientes, Mexico	
4	Win	4–0	Scott Paul	TKO	2 (4), 1:30	Apr 10, 2010	Hard Rock Hotel and Casino, Paradise, Nevada, U.S.	
3	Win	3–0	Bobby Hill	TKO	3 (4), 2:59	Mar 12, 2010	Gaylord Hotel, Grapevine, Texas, U.S.	
2	Win	2–0	John Michael Vega	TKO	1 (4), 1:07	Feb 14, 2010	Las Vegas Hilton, Winchester, Nevada, U.S.	
1	Win	1–0	Steven Cox	TKO	1 (4), 1:21	Jan 16, 2010	Hard Rock Hotel and Casino, Paradise, Nevada, U.S.	

== See also ==
- List of boxing families

Sporting positions
Amateur boxing titles
Previous: Danny O'Connor	U.S. Golden Gloves light welterweight champion 2009	Next: Gary Allen Russell
World boxing titles
Preceded by Mauricio Herrera	WBA light welterweight champion Interim title December 13, 2014 – February 2, 2016; Vacated	Vacant Title next held by Alberto Puello
