= Brad Solomon =

American professional boxer (born 1983)

Personal information
- Nickname: King
- Born: Brad Elliot Solomon; May 29, 1983 (age 43) Lafayette, Louisiana, U.S.
- Height: 5 ft 11 in (180 cm)
- Weight: Welterweight; Light middleweight

Boxing career
- Reach: 72 in (183 cm)
- Stance: Orthodox

Boxing record
- Total fights: 35
- Wins: 29
- Win by KO: 9
- Losses: 6

Brad Elliot Solomon (born May 29, 1983) is an American professional boxer.

== Amateur career ==
A three time National Golden Gloves Champion, once in the Welterweight and twice in the Junior Welterweight divisions. In 2007 at the United States Amateur championships he Lost the semi-final fight to Mexican American Javier Molina 13 to 17. He had a record of 20 wins and 5 losses.

== Pro career ==
On December 3, 2009 Solomon beat undefeated Prospect Ray Robinson by a S.D. in an 8-round bout. Brad would also win against undefeated Prospect, Puerto Rican Kenny Galarza in a 10-round unanimous decision.

On January 18, 2011 Solomon recorded his biggest win so far, defeating 30-1-1 Demetrius Hopkins by Unanimous decision at the Seminole Hard Rock Hotel and Casino, Hollywood, Florida, USA.

Solomon won and defended on multiple occasions the World Boxing Association International title.

Solomon fought on the undercard of Floyd Mayweather Jr. vs. Manny Pacquiao. On that card Solomon defeated Adrian Granados by split decision.

== Professional boxing record ==
34 fights	29 wins	5 losses
By knockout	9	2
By decision	20	3

No.	Result	Record	Opponent	Type	Round, time	Date	Location	Notes
34	Loss	29–5	(Mexico) Ramon Barajas	SD	6 (6)	2022-03-24	(Mexico) Palenque de la Feria, Tepic	
33	Loss	29–4	(United States) Blair Cobbs	TKO	5 (10)	2021-06-19	(United States) Don Haskins Center, El Paso	
32	Win	29–3	(Mexico) Lisandro de los Santos	UD	6 (6)	2021-02-06	(Mexico) Arena Martin Canizales, Ures	
31	Loss	28–3	(United States) Alexis Rocha	UD	10 (10)	2020-02-14	(United States) Honda Center, Anaheim	For WBC Continental Americas welterweight title
30	Loss	28–2	(United States) Vergil Ortiz Jr.	KO	5 (12)	2019-12-13	(United States) Fantasy Springs Resort Casino, Indio	
29	Win	28–1	(Northern Ireland) Paddy Gallagher	SD	10 (10)	2018-04-27	(United States) KFC Yum! Center, Louisville	
28	Win	27–1	(Nicaragua) David Bency	UD	9	2017-07-29	Gimnasio Municipal, Puerto Armuelles, Panama	
27	Loss	26–1	(Russia) Konstantin Ponomarev	SD	10	2016-04-09	(United States) MGM Grand Garden Arena, Las Vegas	
26	Win	26–0	(United States) Raymond Serrano	UD	10	2015-10-16	(United States) Aviator Sports & Events Center, Brooklyn, New York	
25	Win	25–0	(United States) Adrián Granados	SD	10	2015-05-02	(United States) MGM Grand Garden Arena, Las Vegas	
24	Win	24–0	(Ecuador) Eduardo Flores	UD	8	2014-11-08	(United States) Events Center, Pharr, Texas	
23	Win	23–0	(Mexico) Freddy Hernández	TKO	6 (12)	2014-09-06	(United States) Laredo Energy Arena, Laredo, Texas	
22	Win	22–0	(Russia) Arman Ovsepyan	UD	8	2014-05-17	(United States) Forum, Inglewood, California	
21	Win	21–0	(United States) Kenny Abril	UD	8	2013-10-12	(United States) Thomas & Mack Center, Las Vegas	
20	Win	20–0	(Colombia) Henry Aurad	KO	5 (10)	2013-06-29	(United States) WinStar World Casino, Thackerville, Oklahoma	
19	Win	19–0	(Dominican Republic) Yoryi Estrella	MD	8	2012-10-27	(United States) El Paso County Coliseum, El Paso, Texas	
18	Win	18–0	(United States) Hector Munoz	UD	8	2012-07-07	(United States) Home Depot Center, Carson, California	
17	Win	17–0	(United States) Demetrius Hopkins	UD	10	2011-03-18	(United States) Seminole Hard Rock Hotel & Casino, Hollywood, Florida	
16	Win	16–0	(Benin) Anges Adjaho	UD	10	2010-12-07	(United States) Seminole Hard Rock Hotel & Casino, Hollywood, Florida	
15	Win	15–0	(Mexico) Javier Gallegos	TKO	2 (10)	2010-11-25	(Nicaragua) Casino Pharaohs, Managua	
14	Win	14–0	(Venezuela) Pablo Vasquez	TKO	5 (10)	2010-10-02	Roberto Durán Arena, Panama City	
13	Win	13–0	(Puerto Rico) Wilfredo Negron	TKO	6 (10)	2010-08-24	(United States) Seminole Hard Rock Hotel & Casino, Hollywood, Florida	
12	Win	12–0	(Puerto Rico) Kenny Galarza	UD	10	2010-06-04	(United States) FIU Fuchs Pavilion, Miami	
11	Win	11–0	(United States) Richard Dinkins	TKO	1 (6)	2010-04-09	(United States) Hilton Towers, Lafayette, Louisiana	
10	Win	10–0	(Cuba) Damian Frias	UD	8	2010-03-20	(United States) Mallory Square, Florida	
9	Win	9–0	(United States) Ray Robinson	MD	8	2009-12-03	(United States) Manhattan Center, New York	
8	Win	8–0	(United States) Thomas Davis	UD	6	2009-08-29	(United States) Civic Center, Rayne, Louisiana	
7	Win	7–0	(United States) Hashim Louis	KO	1 (4)	2009-07-25	(United States) Hollywood Casino, Bay Saint Louis, Mississippi	
6	Win	6–0	(United States) Gundrick King	TKO	2 (4)	2009-06-20	(United States) Westin Hotel Peachtree Plaza, Atlanta	
5	Win	5–0	(United States) Anthony Bowman	UD	4	2009-05-29	(United States) Belle of Baton Rouge Casino, Louisiana	
4	Win	4–0	(United States) Anthony Brown	TKO	4 (4)	2009-03-21	(United States) Palladium Arena, Atlanta	
3	Win	3–0	(United States) Anthony Bowman	UD	4	2009-01-24	(United States) Fitzgeralds Casino & Hotel, Tunica, Mississippi	
2	Win	2–0	(United States) Marcus Brooks	UD	6	2008-08-30	(United States) Holiday Inn Select, Atlanta	
1	Win	1–0	(El Salvador) Miguel Alfaro	UD	4	2008-02-22	(United States) Center Stage, Atlanta	

Sporting positions
Amateur boxing titles
Previous: Daniel Jacobs	U.S. Golden Gloves welterweight champion 2005	Next: Demetrius Andrade
Previous: Jeremy Bryan	U.S. Golden Gloves light welterweight champion 2006–2007	Next: Danny O'Connor
