= Humberto Tapia =

Mexican boxer

Personal information
- Nickname: Tijuana
- Born: Humberto Tapia Armenta; 10 January 1986 Tijuana, Baja California, Mexico
- Died: 29 March 2011 (aged 25) Tijuana, Baja California, Mexico
- Height: 5 ft 9 in (177 cm)
- Weight: Welterweight; Light Welterweight; Lightweight

Boxing career
- Reach: 72 in (184 cm)
- Stance: Orthodox

Boxing record
- Total fights: 32
- Wins: 15
- Win by KO: 8
- Losses: 16
- Draws: 1
- No contests: 0

Humberto Tapia Armenta (10 January 1986 – 29 March 2011) was a Mexican professional boxer born in Tijuana, Baja California. He was in the Light Welterweight division and was the Inaugural WBC FECOMBOX Light Welterweight Champion.

== Professional career ==
On 23 October 2006 Tapia beat title contender Ramón Montaño at the Palo Duro Golf Club in Nogales, Arizona. This bout was televised on TeleFutura.

=== WBC FECOMBOX Championship ===
In September 2007, Humberto won the Inaugural WBC FECOMBOX Light Welterweight Championship by beating the veteran Augusto Gamez at El Foro in Tijuana, Baja California, Mexico.

=== Legacy ===
Tapia fought and went the distance with many notable fighters like current WBA World Champion Brandon Ríos, Ramón Montaño, Rock Allen, Danny García, Carlos Molina, Michael Torres, Danny O'Connor, and Antonio Orozco.

==== Death ====
While training, Humberto was killed at the Hermanos Ulloa Gym in Tijuana. After a physical altercation with his boxing promoter, he pulled out a 9mm hand gun and shot Tapia.
