= Javier Molina =

American boxer

Personal information
- Nickname: El Intocable
- Born: Javier Molina Casillas; January 2, 1990 (age 36) Commerce, California, U.S.
- Height: 5 ft 10 in (178 cm)
- Weight: Welterweight

Boxing career
- Reach: 68 in (173 cm)
- Stance: Orthodox

Boxing record
- Total fights: 28
- Wins: 22
- Win by KO: 9
- Losses: 6

Javier Molina Casillas (born January 2, 1990) is an American professional boxer. As an amateur, he won the 2007 U.S. National Championships at the age of 17 and represented the United States the following year at the 2008 Beijing Olympics.

== Personal life ==
Molina's father, Miguel, had a successful amateur boxing career in Ciudad Juárez, Mexico, before he migrated to the United States. His older brother Carlos is a highly regarded prospect with a 17-1-1 record, and his twin brother, Oscar Molina, fights on the Mexican Olympic team.

== Amateur career ==
With a Vicente Fernández ring entrance song of "No Me Se Rajar", a tune that reflects the macho culture that prevails in Mexico, Molina finished his amateur career with a record of 111-12. He won a bronze medal at the 2006 Cadet World Championships at lightweight and a national title at the 2006 Junior Olympic International Invitational. He knocked down Karl Dargan (a two-time 141-pound U.S. champion and winner of the 2007 Pan American Games) twice at the U.S. championships. He then won against Jeremy Bryan and Dan O'Connor, followed by Brad Solomon in the finals, to win the junior welterweight title. At the World Championships in 2007, he beat Azerbaijan's Emil Maharramov, the 2005 bronze medalist, 27-10, but lost to England's 2008 Olympian Bradley Saunders.

=== 2008 Olympics ===
At the Olympic qualifier, Molina beat Myke Carvalho and then sealed his qualification with a win over Canada's Kevin Bizier. He lost his Olympic debut 1:14 to Boris Georgiev of Bulgaria. According to at least one doctor, it was a fight that never should have taken place. After it was over, Coach Dan Campbell said Molina had gone into the bout with a small hole in his lung, which allowed air to seep out beneath the skin.

== Professional career ==
Molina is signed to the promotional company Goossen Tutor. In his third fight, he got a second round K.O. over veteran Miguel Garcia.

== Professional boxing record ==
26 fights	22 wins	4 losses
By knockout	9	0
By decision	13	4
Draws	0	

No.	Result	Record	Opponent	Type	Round, time	Date	Location	Notes
26	Loss	22–4	Jesus Alejandro Ramos	UD	10	1 May 2021	Dignity Health Sports Park, Carson, USA	
25	Loss	22–3	José Pedraza	UD	10	19 Sep 2020	The Bubble, Las Vegas, USA	
24	Win	22–2	Amir Imam	UD	8	22 Feb 2020	MGM Grand Garden Arena, Paradise, USA	
23	Win	21–2	Hiroki Okada	KO	1 (10)	2 Nov 2019	Dignity Health Sports Park, Carson, USA	
22	Win	20–2	Manuel Mendez	UD	8	17 Aug 2019	Banc of California Stadium, Los Angeles, USA	
21	Win	19–2	Abdiel Ramírez	UD	8	23 Mar 2019	The Hangar, Costa Mesa, USA	
20	Win	18–2	Jessie Roman	UD	8	1 Jun 2018	Belasco Theater, Los Angeles, USA	
19	Loss	17–2	Jamal James	UD	10	19 Jan 2016	Club Nokia, Los Angeles, USA	
18	Win	17–1	Lenwood Dozier	RTD	7 (10)	13 Oct 2015	Little Creek Casino Resort, Shelton, USA	
17	Win	16–1	Luis Prieto	SD	6 (6)	1 Nov 2014	Arena Coliseo, Mexico City, Mexico	
16	Win	15–1	Jorge Pimentel	KO	3 (8)	6 Sep 2014	Gimnasio Miguel Hidalgo, Puebla, Mexico	
15	Win	14–1	Francisco Javier Parra	KO	1 (6)	8 Jun 2013	Villa Charra, Tijuana, Mexico	
14	Win	13–1	Joseph Elegele	UD	8	9 Mar 2013	The Hangar, Costa Mesa, USA	
13	Win	12–1	Fernando Silva	MD	6	24 Nov 2012	Gimnasio Municipal "Jose Neri Santos", Ciudad Juárez, Mexico	
12	Win	11–1	Octavio Narvaez	TKO	3 (6)	22 Jun 2012	Soboba Casino, San Jacinto, USA	
11	Win	10–1	Alberto Herrera	UD	6	20 Jan 2012	Pearl Theater, Paradise, USA	
10	Loss	9–1	Artemio Reyes	UD	8	28 Oct 2011	Bally's Event Center, Atlantic City, USA	
9	Win	9–0	John Revish	UD	6	15 Sep 2011	County Coliseum, El Paso, USA	
8	Win	8–0	Hector Alatorre	UD	6	24 Jun 2011	Pechanga Resort and Casino, Temecula, USA	
7	Win	7–0	David Lopez	UD	6	27 May 2011	Reno Events Center, Reno, USA	
6	Win	6–0	Danny Diaz	UD	4	14 May 2011	Home Depot Center, Carson, USA	
5	Win	5–0	Francisco Ríos	UD	4	27 Nov 2010	Oracle Arena, Oakland, USA	
4	Win	4–0	Antonio Arauz	TKO	1 (0:39)	7 Oct 2010	Tachi Palace Hotel & Casino, Lemoore, USA	
3	Win	3–0	Miguel Garcia	TKO	2 (2:42)	27 Nov 2009	Pechanga Resort and Casino, Temecula, USA	
2	Win	2–0	Gerald Valdez	TKO	2 (2:39)	23 Apr 2009	Tachi Palace Hotel & Casino, Lemoore, USA	
1	Win	1–0	Jaime Cabrera	TKO	2 (1:50)	27 Mar 2009	Nokia Theater, Los Angeles, USA	
