= Antonio Orozco (boxer) =

Mexican boxer

Personal information
- Nickname: Relentless
- Born: 30 October 1987 (age 38) Tecate, Baja California, Mexico
- Height: 5 ft 7 in (170 cm)
- Weight: Light welterweight; Welterweight

Boxing career
- Reach: 70 in (178 cm)
- Stance: Orthodox

Boxing record
- Total fights: 30
- Wins: 28
- Win by KO: 17
- Losses: 2

Antonio Orozco (born 30 October 1987) is a Mexican professional boxer.

== Amateur career ==
Antonio had a very good amateur career, he holds victories over Mexican Olympian, Jessie Vargas and U.S. Olympian, Javier Molina. Orozco boxed out of The Garden City Boxing Club where he was trained by five trainers. His original trainers included Ignacio "Buck" Avila, Antonio Orozco Sr., Manuel Rios, Juan M. Aldana Jr. and Alfred Ritz.

== Professional career ==
On 11 June 2010, Orozco beat Mike Peralta by unanimous decision in San Diego.

In July 2011, Antonio beat the veteran Josh Beeman by knockout. This was the first time he had ever been knocked down in a fight.

On 14 September 2018, fought for a world title for the first time in his career, against Jose Carlos Ramirez, for the WBC light welterweight belt. In action-packed fight, Orozco got dropped twice by Ramirez, once in the fourth and once in the eighth round. Ramirez was also the more active fighter, especially towards the end of the fight, earning him the unanimous decision win over Orozco.

In his next bout, Orozco got a comeback win against Jose Luis Rodriguez. This was Orozco's first fight under legendary trainer Freddie Roach. Both boxers had they say throughout the fight, but Orozco got the edge with his aggressiveness and boxing skills, en route to a unanimous decision win.

On 10 August 2019, Orozco fought undefeated rising prospect Vergil Ortiz Jr. Orozco got dropped three times by Ortiz Jr, which culminated in a TKO victory for Ortiz Jr in the sixth round.

== Professional boxing record ==
30 fights	28 wins	2 losses
By knockout	17	1
By decision	11	1

No.	Result	Record	Opponent	Type	Round, time	Date	Location	Notes
30	Loss	28–2	(United States) Vergil Ortiz Jr.	KO	6 (12), 2:16	10 August 2019	(United States) The Theatre at Grand Prairie, Grand Prairie, Texas, U.S.	
29	Win	28–1	(Mexico) Jose Luis Rodriguez	UD	10	30 March 2019	(United States) Fantasy Springs Resort Casino, Indio, California, U.S.	
28	Loss	27–1	(United States) José Carlos Ramírez	UD	12	14 September 2018	(United States) Save Mart Center, Fresno, California, U.S.	For WBC light welterweight title
27	Win	27–0	(Mexico) Martin Honorio	UD	8	16 March 2018	(United States) Belasco Theater, Los Angeles	
26	Win	26–0	(United States) KeAndre Gibson	TKO	4 (10), 1:31	1 April 2017	(United States) The Cosmopolitan of Las Vegas, Las Vegas, Nevada	
25	Win	25–0	(Mexico) Abner Lopez	UD	10	30 July 2016	(United States) Fantasy Springs Casino, Indio, California	
24	Win	24–0	(Venezuela) Miguel Acosta	KO	1 (10), 1:54	25 March 2016	(United States) Fantasy Springs Casino, Indio, California	
23	Win	23–0	(Mexico) Humberto Soto	UD	10	3 October 2015	(United States) StubHub Center, Carson, California	
22	Win	22–0	(United States) Emanuel Taylor	UD	10	15 May 2015	(United States) US Airway Centre, Phoenix, Arizona	
21	Win	21–0	(United States) Steve Forbes	UD	8	10 October 2014	(United States) Fantasy Springs Casino, Indio, California	
20	Win	20–0	(Mexico) Martin Honorio	UD	10	15 May 2014	(United States) Del Mar Fairgrounds, Del Mar, California	
19	Win	19–0	(Mexico) Miguel Angel Huerta	KO	2 (10), 1:00	24 January 2014	(United States) Fantasy Springs Casino, Indio, California	
18	Win	18–0	(Colombia) Ivan Hernandez	KO	3 (10), 1:39	24 August 2013	(United States) StubHub Center, Carson, California	
17	Win	17–0	(Mexico) Jose Reynoso	TKO	7 (10), 1:13	3 May 2013	(United States) The Cosmopolitan of Las Vegas, Chelsea Ballroom, Las Vegas, Nevada	
16	Win	16–0	(United States) Danny Escobar	KO	6 (8), 2:06	10 November 2012	(United States) Staples Center, Los Angeles, California	
15	Win	15–0	(Puerto Rico) Alberto Cruz	TKO	3 (8), 3:00	30 June 2012	(United States) Fantasy Springs Casino, Indio, California	
14	Win	14–0	(United States) Dillet Frederick	TKO	3 (8), 1:45	5 May 2012	(United States) MGM Grand, Las Vegas, Nevada	
13	Win	13–0	(Mexico) Rodolfo Armenta	TKO	4 (8), 1:09	24 February 2012	(United States) Hard Rock Hotel and Casino, The Joint, Las Vegas, Nevada	
12	Win	12–0	(United States) Fernando Rodríguez	UD	6	17 September 2011	(United States) Staples Center, Los Angeles, California	
11	Win	11–0	(United States) Josh Beeman	KO	4 (6), 1:42	1 July 2011	(United States) Fantasy Springs Casino, Indio, California	
10	Win	10–0	(The Bahamas) Hensley Strachan	KO	1 (6)	2 June 2011	(United States) Orange County Fairgrounds, Costa Mesa, California	
9	Win	9–0	(Mexico) Manuel Aguilar	TKO	1 (6), 1:42	18 March 2011	(United States) Orange County Fairgrounds, Costa Mesa, California	
8	Win	8–0	(Mexico) Humberto Tapia	UD	6	26 August 2010	(United States) Club Nokia, Los Angeles, California	
7	Win	7–0	(United States) Mike Peralta	UD	6	11 June 2010	(United States) Four Points Sheraton Hotel, San Diego, California	
6	Win	6–0	(Mexico) Jaime Orrantia	KO	3 (6), 0:47	25 February 2010	(United States) Four Points Sheraton Hotel, San Diego, California	
5	Win	5–0	(Mexico) Mario Angeles	TKO	1 (4), 2:36	12 November 2009	(United States) Four Points Sheraton Hotel, San Diego, California	
4	Win	4–0	(United States) Antonio Sorria	TKO	3 (4), 3:00	4 June 2009	(United States) Four Points Sheraton Hotel, San Diego, California	
3	Win	3–0	(Kyrgyzstan) Yakub Shidaev	UD	4	30 April 2009	(United States) 4th and B, San Diego, California	
2	Win	2–0	(Mexico) Juan Carlos Diaz	KO	1 (4), 1:08	26 March 2009	(United States) Four Points Sheraton Hotel, San Diego, California	
1	Win	1–0	(United States) Ricardo Martinez	TKO	3 (4), 1:43	27 June 2008	(United States) Doubletree Hotel, Ontario, California	
