= Antonio Lozada Jr. =

Mexican boxer

Personal information
- Nickname: Cañitas
- Born: Antonio Lozada Jr. 4 April 1990 (age 36) Tijuana, Baja California, Mexico
- Height: 6 ft 0 in (183 cm)
- Weight: Super featherweight Lightweight; Light welterweight

Boxing career
- Reach: 73 1/2 in (187 cm)
- Stance: Orthodox

Boxing record
- Total fights: 46
- Wins: 40
- Win by KO: 34
- Losses: 5
- Draws: 1

Antonio Lozada Jr. (born 15 May 1992) is a Mexican professional boxer. He is considered one of the best prospects to come from Mexico.

== Personal life ==
Nicknamed Cañitas after his father Cañas which is Spanish for sugar cane. His father, Antonio Lozada Sr., is a boxing agent who mans the career of Lozada Jr. and also of newly crowned three time world champion Humberto Soto as well as practically every top prospect in the Mexican town of Tijuana which includes Marvin Quintero.

== Professional career ==
Lozada turned professional at only sixteen years of age. His eighteenth victory came in Cozumel, going the distance with Tomas Sierra. In 2009 he was not very busy due to a nasal operation but in October of that year he fought Salvador Carreon winning by third-round TKO.

He headlined his first nationally televised card in April 2010 on Televisa, where he won the WBC FECARBOX light welterweight title by defeating the veteran Colombian Henry Aurad via second-round TKO.

On 25 June 2011 Lozada faced then-undefeated Roberto Ortiz for the WBC Silver light welterweight title.

On 17 March 2018, Lozada knocked out Puerto Rico prospect Felix Verdejo in 10 rounds.

== Professional boxing record ==
40 Wins (34 knockouts, 6 decisions), 5 Losses, 1 Draw
| Res. | Record | Opponent | Type | Rd., Time | Date | Location | Notes |
| Loss | 40-5-1 | (Dominican Republic) Javier Fortuna | TKO | 6 (10), 0:26 | 2020-11-20 | (United States) Staples Center, Los Angeles, California, U.S. | |
| Loss | 40-4-1 | (Mexico) Marco Juarez | SD | 10 | 2019-09-20 | Grand Hotel, Tijuana, Mexico | |
| Loss | 40-3-1 | (Puerto Rico) Jose Pedraza | TKO | 9 (10), 2:34 | 2019-05-25 | (United States) Osceola Heritage Park, Kissimmee, Florida, U.S. | |
| Draw | 40-2-1 | (Mexico) Hector Ambriz | SD | 8 | 2018-08-25 | (United States) Gila River Arena, Glendale, Arizona, U.S. | |
| Win | 40-2 | (Mexico) Christian Valverde | TKO | 1 (10), 1:46 | 2018-05-26 | Auditorio Ernesto Rufo, Rosarito, Mexico | |
| Win | 39-2 | (Puerto Rico) Felix Verdejo | TKO | 10 (10), 2:37) | 2018-03-17 | (United States) Madison Square Garden Theater, New York City, New York, U.S. | |
| Win | 38-2 | (Mexico) Miguel Garcia | TKO | 2 (8), 2:41 | 2017-11-04 | Gasmart Stadium, Tijuana, Mexico | |
| Win | 37-2 | (Mexico) Jesus Eduardo Soto | TKO | 2 (10), 0:22 | 2017-04-22 | Auditorio Ernesto Rufo, Rosarito, Mexico | |
| Win | 36-2 | (Mexico) Jose Maria Valdez | UD | 10 | 2016-11-19 | Auditorio Ernesto Rufo, Rosarito, Mexico | |
| Win | 35-2 | (Mexico) Carlos Jacobo | KO | 4 (10) | 2016-07-02 | Auditorio Ernesto Rufo, Rosarito, Mexico | |
| Win | 34-2 | (Mexico) Cristian Solano | TKO | 5 (10) | 2014-05-03 | Auditorio Ernesto Rufo, Rosarito, Mexico | |
| Win | 33-2 | (Mexico) Ramiro Alcaraz | SD | 10 | 2013-12-14 | Auditorio Ernesto Rufo, Rosarito, Mexico | |
| Loss | 32-2 | (Mexico) Ramiro Alcaraz | SD | 8 | 2013-09-28 | Polideportivo Centenario, Los Mochis, Mexico | |
| Win | 32-1 | (Mexico) Jorge Pimentel | RTD | 9 (10), 3:00 | 2013-04-05 | Teatro Obrero, Monterrey, Mexico | |
| Win | 31-1 | (Mexico) Jose Luis Payan | KO | 1 (10), 1:30 | 2013-02-09 | Arena Itson, Ciudad Obregón, Mexico | |
| Win | 30-1 | (Mexico) David Cavita | KO | 3 (12), 0:42 | 2012-12-21 | Auditorio Ernesto Rufo, Rosarito, Mexico | Retained interim WBF light welterweight title |
| Win | 29-1 | (Mexico) Edgar Llanes | KO | 2 (12), 2:55 | 2012-11-10 | Estadio Morelos, Ecatepec, Mexico | |
| Win | 28-1 | (Mexico) Daniel Valenzuela | KO | 4 (10), 1:02 | 2012-09-29 | Auditorio Ernesto Rufo, Rosarito, Mexico | Won interim WBF light welterweight title |
| Win | 27-1 | (Mexico) Carlos Urias | TKO | 1 (10), 2:47 | 2012-07-21 | Auditorio Ernesto Rufo, Rosarito, Mexico | |
| Win | 26-1 | (Mexico) Daniel Valenzuela | UD | 10 | 2012-03-17 | Auditorio Ernesto Rufo, Rosarito, Mexico | |
| Win | 25-1 | (Mexico) Cesar Chavez | TKO | 2 (10), 1:11 | 2011-12-03 | Auditorio Ernesto Rufo, Rosarito, Mexico | |
| Win | 24-1 | (Mexico) Joel Juarez | RTD | 4 (8), 3:00 | 2011-09-03 | Estadio Centenario, Los Mochis, Mexico | |
| Loss | 23-1 | (Mexico) Roberto Ortiz | TKO | 4 (12), 0:53 | 2011-06-25 | Cozumel, Mexico | For WBC Silver light welterweight title |
| Win | 23-0 | (Mexico) Hugo Hernández | TKO | 4 (12), 2:54 | 2010-07-24 | Palenque Hipodromo, Tijuana, Mexico | Retained WBC FECARBOX light welterweight title |
| Win | 22-0 | (Colombia) Henry Aurad | TKO | 4 (12), 1:20 | 2010-04-10 | Palenque Morelos, Tijuana, Mexico | Won vacant WBC FECARBOX light welterweight title |
| Win | 21-0 | (Mexico) Jesus Valenzuela | KO | 1 (8), 1:32 | 2009-12-19 | Arena Itson, Ciudad Obregón, Mexico | |
| Win | 20-0 | (Mexico) Salvador Carreon | TKO | 3 (10), 1:48 | 2009-10-30 | Domo Del Mar, Ciudad del Carmen, Mexico | |
| Win | 19-0 | (Mexico) Tomas Sierra | UD | 6 | 2009-03-28 | Plaza de Toros, Tijuana, Mexico | |
| Win | 18-0 | (Mexico) Tomas Sierra | UD | 6 | 2008-12-20 | Parque Andrés, Cozumel, Mexico | |
| Win | 17-0 | (Mexico) Ernesto Aboyte | UD | 6 | 2008-06-27 | Gimnasio Oscar García, Ensenada, Mexico | |
| Win | 16-0 | (Mexico) Juan Ruiz | KO | 2 (10), 2:25 | 2008-06-16 | Auditorio Municipal, Tijuana, Mexico | |
| Win | 15-0 | (Mexico) Adolfo Arrellano | TKO | 1 (6), 0:06 | 2008-03-28 | Arena Adolfo López, Tlalnepantla de Baz, Mexico | |
| Win | 14-0 | (Mexico) Neftali Perez | KO | 1 (6), 0:30 | 2008-03-15 | Auditorio Centenario, Gómez Palacio, Mexico | |
| Win | 13-0 | (Mexico) Eugenio Lopez | KO | 1 (6) 1:02 | 2007-10-20 | Autodromo, Cancún, Mexico | |
| Win | 12-0 | (Mexico) Celso Gomez | RTD | 4 (6), 3:00 | 2007-09-14 | Auditorio Benito Juarez, Los Mochis, Mexico | |
| Win | 11-0 | (Mexico) Charly Valdez | KO | 1 (6), 2:25 | 2007-08-27 | El Foro, Tijuana, Mexico | |
| Win | 10-0 | (Mexico) Roberto Resendiz | KO | 1 (6), 0:11 | 2007-07-13 | Auditorio Centenario, Gómez Palacio, Mexico | |
| Win | 9-0 | (Mexico) Carlos Urrea | TKO | 1 (4), 1:23 | 2007-04-30 | El Foro, Tijuana, Mexico | |
| Win | 8-0 | (Mexico) Javier Castro | TKO | 1 (4), 1:05 | 2007-03-24 | Estacionamento de Alamoda, Guasave, Mexico | |
| Win | 7-0 | (Mexico) Gaby Ruiz | TKO | 1 (4), 0:15 | 2007-02-23 | Deportivo Tlalli, Tlalnepantla de Baz, Mexico | |
| Win | 6-0 | (Germany) Abraham Rotmizbel | KO | 1 (4), 0:22 | 2007-02-16 | Coliseo Laguna, Torreón, Mexico | |
| Win | 5-0 | (United States) Willy Velasco | KO | 3 (4), 0:58 | 2007-02-03 | Auditorio Municipal, San José Iturbide, Mexico | |
| Win | 4-0 | (United States) Levi Perez | KO | 1 (4), 0:14 | 2006-11-17 | Auditorio Municipal, Torreón, Mexico | |
| Win | 3-0 | (Mexico) Juan Gudino | KO | 1 (4), 1:57 | 2006-11-09 | El Foro, Tijuana, Mexico | |
| Win | 2-0 | (Mexico) Julio Acosta | KO | 1 (4), 1:48 | 2006-10-13 | Auditorio Benito Juarez, Los Mochis, Mexico | |
| Win | 1-0 | (Mexico) Roberto Mondragon | TKO | 3 (4), 2:26 | 2006-08-04 | Palenque Hipodromo, Tijuana, Mexico | |
