= List of U.S. national Golden Gloves light welterweight champions =

This is a list of United States national Golden Gloves champions in the light welterweight division, along with the state or region they represented. The weight limit for light welterweights was first contested at 139 lb (63 kg), but was increased to 141 lb (64 kg) in 2003.

- 1966 - Larry Draut - Santa Rosa, CA
- 1967 - Willie Richardson - Detroit, MI
- 1968 - Harold Beal - Kansas City, MO
- 1969 - Eddie Beauford - Indianapolis, IN
- 1970 - Larry Bonds - Denver, CO
- 1971 - Wiley Johnson - Cincinnati, OH
- 1972 - Sugar Ray Seales - Tacoma, WA
- 1973 - Larry Bonds - Denver, CO
- 1974 - Sugar Ray Leonard - Palmer Park, MD
- 1975 - Paul Sherry - Las Vegas, NV
- 1976 - Ronnie Shields - Fort Worth, TX
- 1977 - Thomas Hearns - Detroit, MI
- 1978 - Ronnie Shields - Fort Worth, TX
- 1979 - Lemuel Steeples - St. Louis, MO
- 1980 - Terry Silver - Louisville, KY
- 1981 - Henry Hughes - Cleveland, OH
- 1982 - Tim Rabon - Lafayette, LA
- 1983 - Roderick Moore - Detroit, MI
- 1984 - Tim Rabon - Lafayette, LA
- 1985 - Robert Guy - Fort Worth, TX
- 1986 - Roy Jones Jr. - Pensacola, FL
- 1987 - Todd Foster - Great Falls, MT
- 1988 - Skipper Kelp - Born in Saigon, Vietnam he fought from Las Vegas, NV
- 1989 - Victor McKinnia - Denver, CO
- 1990 - Mark Lewis - Los Angeles, CA
- 1991 - Terron Millett - St. Louis, MO
- 1992 - Robert Frazier - Syracuse, NY
- 1993 - David Diaz - Chicago, IL
- 1994 - David Diaz - Chicago, IL
- 1995 - Demarcus Corley - Washington, DC
- 1996 - David Diaz - Chicago, IL
- 1997 - Adan Reyes - Los Angeles, CA
- 1998 - Ricardo Williams - Jr., Cincinnati, OH
- 1999 - Alejandre F Johnson - Philadelphia, PA
- 2000 - Jessie Byers - Knoxville, TN
- 2001 - Chad Aquino - Kansas City, MO
- 2002 - Kevin McLaurin - Denver, CO
- 2003 - Lorenzo Reynolds - Saginaw, MI
- 2004 - Jeremy Bryan - Paterson, NJ
- 2005 - Jeremy Bryan - Paterson, NJ
- 2006 - Brad Solomon - Lafayette, LA
- 2007 - Kaila Browe - Lafayette, LA
- 2008 - Danny O'Connor - Framingham, MA
- 2009 - Jose Benavidez - at only 16 years old, he was the youngest light welterweight champions.
- 2010 - Gary Allen Russell III
- 2011 - Michael Reed - Washington DC
- 2012 - James Brumley (London,KY)
- 2013 - Julian Rodriguez - New Jersey
- 2014 - Gary Antuanne Russell - Maryland
- 2015 - Jaron Ennis - Pennsylvania
- 2016 - Frank Martin - Indianapolis
- 2017 - Aadam Ali - New Jersey
