= Daniel Valenzuela =

Daniel Valenzuela may refer to:

- Daniel Valenzuela (actor) (born 1956), Argentine actor
- Daniel Valenzuela (boxer) (born 1982), Mexican boxer
- Daniel Valenzuela Salazar (born 1980), Chilean politician
- Daniel Valenzuela, U.S. politician, contended the 2018–19 Phoenix mayoral special election
