= Chad Aquino =

American boxer

Personal information
- Born: January 14, 1982 (age 44) Kansas City, Missouri, U.S.
- Height: 5 ft 8 in (175 cm)
- Weight: Welterweight

Boxing career
- Reach: 72 in (183 cm)
- Stance: Southpaw

Boxing record
- Total fights: 8
- Wins: 7
- Win by KO: 4
- Losses: 0
- Draws: 1
- No contests: 0

Chad Aquino (born January 14, 1982) is an American former professional boxer who competed from 2004 to 2006. As an amateur, he won the 2001 National Golden Gloves at light welterweight.

== Early life ==
Aquino was born in Kansas City, Missouri.

== Amateur career ==
Aquino is the 2001 Golden Gloves Champion at light welterweight.

== Professional career ==
On April 22, 2005 with a solid left to the jaw of Terrance Jett, Aquino took his fourth victory. It was the first fight on the ESPN's Friday Night Fights card.
