= Danny Garcia (boxer) =

American boxer (born 1988)

Personal information
- Nickname: Swift
- Born: Danny Óscar Garcia; March 20, 1988 (age 38) Philadelphia, Pennsylvania, U.S.
- Height: 5 ft 8 1/2 in (174 cm)
- Weight: Light welterweight; Welterweight; Light middleweight; Middleweight

Boxing career
- Reach: 68 1/2 in (174 cm)
- Stance: Orthodox

Boxing record
- Total fights: 42
- Wins: 38
- Win by KO: 22
- Losses: 4

Danny Óscar Garcia (born March 20, 1988) is an American professional boxer. He has held multiple world championships in two weight classes, including the unified World Boxing Association (WBA) (Super version), World Boxing Council (WBC), Ring magazine, and lineal light welterweight titles between 2012 and 2015, and the WBC welterweight title from 2016 to 2017.

== Early life ==
Garcia was born in North Philadelphia to Puerto Rican parents. His mother was from Bayamón and his father was from Naguabo. His father, Ángel, was also a boxer who introduced him to boxing, taking him to Philadelphia's Harrowgate Boxing Club when he was ten years old, which was the minimum age allowed by local law for a minor to train. Ángel has since been Danny's primary boxing coach. Having been raised in the city with the second-largest Puerto Rican community in the United States, Danny identified with his heritage, stating early in his career the desire to become the "next great Puerto Rican fighter".

Danny Garcia admired Boxing Hall of Famer Carlos Ortiz as his favorite boxer and considered Ortiz's fight against Lenny Matthews in Philadelphia among the most memorable he had ever witnessed. Garcia finished his amateur career with 107 wins 13 losses. Danny now has three children with girlfriend Erica Mendez.

=== Amateur highlights ===
- 2006 U.S. national champion
- 2005 Tammer Tournament champion
- 2005 Under-19 national champion

== Professional career ==
=== Light welterweight ===
==== Early career ====
Garcia made his professional debut on November 17, 2007, at the Borgata Hotel Casino in Atlantic City, New Jersey against Mike Denby. He opened up by throwing power shots, but it was a short right that sent Denby to the canvas. Another right put Denby down again in a neutral corner. Garcia moved in for the knockout, and sent Denby down for the third and final time with a right-left combination. After the third knockdown, the referee waved the bout over. His next fight took place on the undercard of the Floyd Mayweather Jr.–Ricky Hatton superfight on December 8, 2007, at the MGM Grand in Las Vegas. Garcia defeated Jesús Villareal by second-round technical knockout. On January 11, 2008, at the Morongo Casino, Resort & Spa in Cabazon, California, Garcia defeated Marlo Córtez by second-round knockout. With precise accurate punches, he disabled Cortéz, dropping him with a left hook early in the second round, forcing the referee to stop the contest.

On March 15, 2008, at the Mandalay Bay Resort & Casino in Las Vegas, Garcia fought Charles Wade. He utilized his speed and quickness to get close to Wade before blasting him with a left hook to knock him out.

In his fifth professional fight, Garcia fought Guadalupe Díaz, on April 19, 2008, at the Thomas & Mack Center in Las Vegas. He hurt Díaz early in the fight with a barrage of punches. The referee was forced to stop the fight after Díaz was on wobbly legs. His next fight took place on May 3, 2008, at the Home Depot Center in Carson, California against Julio Gamboa. Garcia was in command of the fight, using his fast hands and good power to win by unanimous decision. On the undercard of the Bernard Hopkins–Kelly Pavlik fight for the world middleweight championship at Boardwalk Hall in Atlantic City, Garcia stopped Dean Nash by technical knockout after three knockdowns in the third round.

He survived a tough fight with Ashley Theophane in February 2010, coming away with a split-decision victory. Garcia knocked out faded contender Mike Arnaoutis in four rounds later in the year. In his next contest held in April 2011, he defeated former lightweight titlist Nate Campbell. On August 15, 2011, Garcia won the vacant NABO Jr. welterweight belt in Los Angeles fighting on the HBO PPV undercard of Hopkins vs. Dawson II, on a split decision over former champion Kendall Holt.

==== Garcia vs. Morales I ====
It was announced that Garcia would get his first world title opportunity, challenging Mexican legend and Ring Top 10 light welterweight, Erik Morales (52-7, 36 KOs) for the WBC super lightweight championship in another chapter of the infamous "Puerto Rico vs. Mexico" boxing rivalry. The fight took place on March 24, 2012, at the Reliant Arena in Houston, Texas. The fight was originally scheduled to take place on January 28, but was postponed because Morales had emergency gallbladder surgery.

Morales came in two pounds over the contracted limit and was subsequently stripped by the WBC of his title. Thus, the title was only at stake for Garcia. Morales was fined $50,000 ($25,000 per pound) which was given to Garcia. Morales earned a $1 million purse, while Garcia was due to make $175,000. This increased to $225,000 following the fines levied against Morales. 5,590 was announced as the attendance for the night. Garcia began the fight slowly, which Morales used to his advantage and injured his nose. As the fight progressed, Garcia gained control, scoring a knockdown in the eleventh round before receiving a unanimous decision in his favor. The scores granted by the judges were 118–111, 117–110 and 116–112 in favour of Garcia. CompuBox statistics showed Garcia landing 238 of 779 punches (31%), and Morales landing 164 of 547 shots (30%).

==== Garcia vs. Khan ====
On 23 May 2012, ESPN announced that Garcia would next fight against the British boxer Amir Khan for the WBA (Super) title. At the pre-fight press conference on 4 June, Khan and Garcia's fathers got into a heated exchange resulting in both fighters promising to knock the other out on 14 July. At the time the fight was announced, WBC were unsure whether to sanction the fight, as Garcia had a mandatory defence due against Ajose Olusegun. The fight was scheduled to take place on 14 July 2012, in Las Vegas. The fight was a title unification bout, as Garcia's WBC title and Khan's WBA (Super) title were both on the line. Khan entered the fight as a heavy favorite, with betting odds at 1–7 in his favor.

Khan seemed the faster of the two early, but Garcia pretty quickly found a way to catch many of Khan's punches and was clearly finding the range with his own. Khan won the first two rounds and could have been on his way to winning the third, but with twenty-nine seconds left in the round Garcia countered a Khan combination with a left hook that caught Khan on the neck and dropped him to the canvas. Khan rose to his feet quickly but had been hurt by the punch, and referee Kenny Bayless took an extra few seconds after administering the standing eight count to make sure that Khan could continue. Garcia resumed his attack and nearly finished off Khan, who was saved when the bell rang to end the round. Eight seconds into the fourth Khan, now on unsteady legs, could not withstand a barrage of punches from Garcia, who was now taking control of the fight. Garcia kept pounding away at Khan, who lost his balance and touched the canvas with his gloves, thus forcing Bayless to administer another standing eight count as a fighter is considered down once any body part of his other than his feet touch the ring after a punch. Khan tried to rally and stay in the fight, but with forty-eight seconds left in the fourth round Garcia knocked him down for a third time. This time, Khan got up quickly, appeared to have recovered from the barrage and told Bayless he was okay to continue. Bayless, after considering Khan's position, decided that the champion had taken enough punishment and stopped the fight, awarding a technical knockout victory.

After the fight, Khan said, "It wasn't my night. I was coming in with my hands down and Danny took advantage of that. He countered very well against me." According to CompuBox stats, Khan landed 92 of 206 punches thrown (45%), with 46 jabs and 46 power shots landed. Garcia landed 65 of his 216 thrown (30%), 60 of which were power shots. Khan earned $950,000, while Garcia had a $520,000 purse. Nevada State Athletic Commission announced the fight generated a total gate of $426,152 from 3,147 tickets sold. The fight averaged 1.3 million viewers on HBO World Championship Boxing.

==== Garcia vs. Morales II ====
On August 23, 2012, Garcia agreed to fight Ring top 10 light welterweight, Érik Morales (52-8, 36 KOs) in a rematch. The fight was scheduled to take place on October 20, in Brooklyn. On October 19, it was revealed that Morales had tested positive for banned substance clenbuterol. This was part of a random drug test from the U.S. Anti-Doping Agency. It was said that the card would still take place. Garcia decided to go ahead with the fight, where he would see a career-high $1 million purse. In front of 11,112 at the newly opened Barclays Center, Garcia retained his WBC, WBA (Super) & The Ring title's by knocking out Morales with a thunderous left hook in the fourth round. Garcia landed only 57 of 220 punches thrown (26%), but it was clear he was looking for an early win. After the fight, Garcia said, "I showed him too much respect in the first fight. You see the first fight, I thought this fight would be more of a war. I never duck anybody. I fought Khan and no one gave me a chance. Keep lining them up and I'll knock them down."

==== Garcia vs. Judah ====
On November 6, Golden Boy Promotions announced a deal had been reached for Garcia to defend his world titles against former two-weight champion Zab Judah (42-7, 29 KOs), which the Barclays Center being the front runners to host the event on January 19, 2013. The fight took place on Showtime. On December 1, the official press conference got heated up between Judah and Angel Garcia, after Angel began insulted Judah over his previous losses and performances. Judah eventually stood up and shouted, "I have a lot of respect for his father but I won't be disrespected." On January 29, it was reported that Garcia had suffered a rib injury, pushing the fight back to take place on April 27 instead. Judah was aiming to become the first ever four-time light welterweight world champion.

In front of an announced crowd of 13,048, Garcia defeated Judah by unanimous decision (115-112, 114–112, 116–111). He earned $1.25 million, a career-high purse at the time, whilst Judah earned $300,000, Garcia started the fight off strong landing body shots. Garcia badly shook Judah in round 5 and it was believed the fight would come to an end in the next round. Although Garcia was unable to finish the fight in the sixth round, he landed many clean shots and dominated the round. One judge scored the round 10-8 for Garcia, although there was no official knockdowns. García eventually dropped Judah in round 8 following a straight right. After the fight, Garcia said, "Regarding the bad blood: It's gone. It's a respect. As you can see, it's a lot of bad blood. I've got cuts, he has cuts. We came here and gave the people of Brooklyn a nice show." Both fighters were cut due to accidental clash of heads in the final round. Richard Schaefer stated Garcia would likely meet the winner of the Peterson vs. Matthysse fight, which was scheduled to take place on May 18. Matthysse won the fight via knockout.

==== Garcia vs. Matthysse ====
On July 18, 2013, it was confirmed that Garcia would meet Argentine slugger Lucas Matthysse (34-2, 32 KOs) on the undercard of the Floyd Mayweather vs. Canelo Alvarez superfight September 14, 2013 at the MGM Grand in Las Vegas. Garcia was a 2-1 underdog going into the fight. With both fighters earning an undisclosed seven-figure purse, the fight would be one of the most expensive undercard fights in history.

Garcia stood firm and fought a mature fight. Matthysse won several of the early rounds, putting heavy pressure on the champion by utilizing speed and punching power. In the middle rounds, Matthysse sustained an injury to his right eye from a Garcia flinch, to which Garcia targeted the eye throughout the remainder of the fight, subsequently taking the lead on the scorecards and closing the challengers eye. In the eleventh round Matthysse landed a punch that knocked out Garcia's mouthpiece, but Garcia turned the tables and knocked Matthysse down in the 11th round with a four-punch combination. Garcia was docked a point in the final round for low blows, but the last round was very competitive with both champion and challenger trading big shots. Garcia took the unanimous decision (115-111, 114-112 and 114–112), giving Matthysse his first decisive loss. This fight also clarified that Garcia's chin is capable of taking big shots, as it was widely touted before the fight that Garcia would not be able to absorb the huge punching power that Matthysse is famous for. With the victory, Garcia won the vacant Lineal light welterweight title.

For defeating Judah and Matthysse, Garcia was named 2013 Boxer of the Year by Stiff Jab.

==== Garcia vs. Herrera ====
An official press conference took place in February 2014 to announce Garcia's next title defence, against veteran boxer Mauricio Herrera (20-3, 7 KOs). The fight was to be aired on Showtime and was the first fight for Garcia in his parents homeland of Puerto Rico. The fight took place at Coliseo Rubén Rodríguez in Bayamón. Garcia retained his titles in a disputed majority decision win over Herrera. The official scorecards read (114-114, 116–112, 116–112). Showtime commentators Al Bernstein, Paulie Malignaggi, and Steve Farhood scored the fight in favor of Herrera, but two judges scored it for Garcia, with one card at draw. Herrera's jab consistently scored and he was viewed by onlookers as the slightly busier fighter. After the fight, Garcia said about Herrera, "He's a crafty veteran. I know every time I step in the ring every contender I fight wants what I got. So they gonna train their heart out and give everything they got, so I expected that. He's a good fighter and it was a good challenge. I had to make adjustment and I'm a true champion." CompuBox Stats showed that Garcia landed on 204 of 675 punches thrown (30%), while Herrera landed 221 of his 695 punches (32%). Herrera believed he won the fight. After four rounds, it was announced the scorecards were 40–36, 39-37 and 38–38 in favour of Garcia. After eight rounds, two judges had Garcia ahead at 78-74 and 77–75, whilst the third judge had it 77-75 for Herrera. According to Bobby Hunter, known for collecting scorecards, 70% of the media scored the fight in favour of Herrera.

==== Garcia vs. Salka ====
On June 24, 2014, it was announced that García would fight lightweight contender Rod Salka (19-3, 3 KOs) at the Barclays Center on August 9 on a Showtime triple-header, which would also included Lamont Peterson vs. Edgar "El Chamaco" Santana. The plan was for Garcia vs. Peterson, if both fighters were able to win their respected fights. Garcia was criticized for choosing to fight Salka, as many believed it was mis-match. At the time, Salka was not ranked at light welterweight. The card also received negative press. ESPN's Teddy Atlas slammed the sanctioning bodies. The bout, which was originally announced as a 12-round fight, was dropped to a 10 rounder and included a catchweight of 142 pounds. No world titles were sanctioned for the fight. WBC president explained, as it was a voluntary and Salka was not ranked, they would not sanction the fight, however if Garcia was to lose, the title would be declared vacant.

The fight proved to be a mis-match after Garcia brutally knocked out Salka in round 2 with a left hook, ending the fight.

Garcia said in relation to taking fight, “Fans last forever; boxing is a short-term career. I got to do what’s best for my life and my career. You can be 70-years-old and a fan. I can only box for another 10 years. I got to do what’s best for me.”

==== Garcia vs. Peterson ====
On January 14, 2015, NBC announced a partnership with Premier Boxing Champions to air premium fights on network television. It was announced that Garcia and Lamont Peterson would fight April 11, 2015 on NBC primetime. The fight was at the Barclays Center in Brooklyn, New York. The highly anticipated bout between Garcia and Peterson took place at a 143-pound catch weight and was a non-title bout. Both fighters had something to prove as Garcia was coming off an extremely tough fight with Mauricio Herrera and Peterson was still reeling from a knockout loss to Lucas Matthysse in 2013.

In the early rounds Peterson was very defensive and attempted to frustrate Garcia with his awkward style. Garcia was the busier fighter the first four or five rounds throwing and landing more punches although having trouble landing clean punches on Peterson. Both boxers took turns setting the pace, Garcia landing combinations and heavily to the body, Peterson jabbing and landing clean single power punches. Peterson's size and athleticism allowed him to stay in the fight even in the face of waves of serious Garcia body blows. Peterson looked strong going into rounds 10, 11, 12, but gave away round ten completely. Garcia maintained a steady attack in the last three rounds of the fight while Peterson began coming forward and throwing everything he had (possibly suspecting he was trailing). Despite a very strong showing by Peterson, Garcia was awarded a majority decision by scores of 114-114, 115–113, 115–113. For the fight, Garcia earned $1.5 million compared to Peterson, who earned a $1.2 million purse. CompuBox stats showed that both fighters stayed busy, with Garcia landing 173 of 589 punches (29%), with Peterson more accurate, landing 170 of his 494 thrown (34%).

=== Welterweight ===
==== Garcia vs. Malignaggi ====
On June 4, 2015, it was announced that Garcia would make his welterweight debut against 34 year old former world champion Paulie Malignaggi (33-6, 7 KOs) at Barclays Center, Brooklyn in a Premier Boxing Champions fight shown on ESPN on August 1. Before a crowd of 7,237, García won the fight with a ninth-round technical knockout at 2:22 of the round. Garcia pushed the pace early, walking through Malignaggi's jab and firing to the head and body with both hands, particularly the right. Malignaggi was cut above his right eye by the third round and had a large welt beneath the right eye in the sixth, having been bludgeoned by several huge shots from García. Malignaggi was still taking a beating at the 2:22 mark of the ninth, when referee Arthur Mercante Jr. wrapped him in his arms to signal the end, beating Malignaggi's corner, which was about to throw in the towel. For the fight, Garcia's purse was $1.25 million compared to Malignaggi's $550,000. At the time of stoppage, the three judges' scorecards read 79–73, 79-73 and 78–74 in favour of Garcia. Following the fight, Malignaggi reflected on whether or not he would continue to fight after the defeat.

==== Garcia vs. Guerrero ====
On November 24, 2015, it was announced that Garcia would be facing Robert Guerrero on January 23, 2016, at Staples Center in Los Angeles in a PBC fight broadcast on FOX which was the first ever major PBC event to be broadcast on the network. Garcia won by unanimous decision 116-112 scored by all judges becoming the new WBC welterweight champion. The attendance was announced 12,052 at the Staples Center. Garcia celebrated in the ring after the fight with his daughter Philly and praised Guerrero, "I'm excited. Guerrero is tough. No one has ever stopped him. He came to fight. He was in shape. I'm taking nothing away from him." Garcia earned a base purse of $1.5 million, $300,000 more than Guerrero.

==== Garcia vs. Vargas ====
After holding out for a possible super fight with Floyd Mayweather Jr., Garcia announced his next fight would be against Colombian fringe contender Samuel Vargas (25-2-1, 13 KOs) at the Liacouras Center in Temple University's in Philadelphia on November 12. It was said that the fight would be a non-title, 10 round fight and would pave the way for a unification fight with Keith Thurman in 2017. This was the first time Garcia fought in his hometown of Philadelphia since 2010. After dropping Vargas in round 2, the fight became one sided. Garcia eventually forced the referee to stop the fight in round 7 following a barrage of punches which pinned Vargas against the ropes. Thurman was on commentator duty for the fight and entered the ring after the fight was over to engage a staredown and exchange of words with Garcia.

==== Garcia vs. Thurman ====
On October 25, Showtime announced several fights to take place towards the end of 2016 and early 2017. One of them was the much anticipated welterweight unification fight between Garcia and fellow undefeated welterweight champion Keith Thurman (27-0, 22 KOs), who holds the WBA title. Garcia defeated journeyman Samuel Vargas in a tune-up fight on November 12, which officially set up the fight for March 4, 2017 at the Barclays Center in New York City. Thurman chose not to have any tune-up and would fight Garcia after a long 9 month rest. At a press conference on January 18, 2017, the fight was officially announced and it was said that it would be shown live on CBS. The conference got extremely heated, leading to Angel Garcia standing up and shouting racial slurs towards Thurman.

Garcia lost the fight on a split decision with the scorecards 116–112, 113-115 & 115–113 in favor of Thurman, making Thurman the unified welterweight world champion. Thurman started off as the aggressor hitting and moving back to avoid García's counter hooks. This was the case for the majority of the fight. Garcia began coming forward through the middle rounds and push Thurman on the back foot. Thurman backed off the championship rounds believing he had a comfortable enough lead to win the fight. MC Jimmy Lennon Jr. gave Garcia false hope that he had won the fight when he announced WBA before WBC, making Garcia believe he had won. Garcia spoke in the post fight interview believing he had a good case of winning the fight, "I thought I won, and I was pushing the fight, but it is what it is. He was trying to counter. I had to wait to find my spots." Compubox stats showed Thurman landed 147 of 570 punches thrown, a percentage of 26% and Garcia landed 130 punches of his 434 thrown (30%). It was also reported that both fighters received a purse of $2 million a piece. The fight was attended by a boxing record of 16,533 at the Barclays Center. According to The Ring, the fight peaked at 5.1 million viewers, which was at the last three rounds. The fight averaged 3.74 million viewers. This was the first time since 1998 that a Saturday primetime boxing telecast drew that kind of audience. The entire card drew an average 3.1 million viewers.

==== Garcia vs. Ríos ====
Due to Keith Thurman being sidelined for the remainder of 2017, on July 17 the WBC president Mauricio Sulaiman told ESPN Deportes, that he would likely order a fight between the #1 ranked Shawn Porter (27-2-1, 17 KOs) and #2 García for the Interim WBC title. He also went on to state, if Porter or Garcia declined to take part in the interim title fight, he would move on to the next highest available ranked fighter. At that time, Manny Pacquiao was #3, Jessie Vargas was #4 and Konstantin Ponomarev was ranked #5 by the WBC. A day later, Porter added fuel to the speculation when he called out Garcia in a WWE-esque promo on social media, "I just heard that the WBC will ask Showtime Shawn Porter to fight another title eliminator. And they want me to fight none other than the cherry picker himself - Danny Garcia. What I say to you Danny Garcia - let's get it on," Porter claimed the ball was now in Garcia's court.

According to reports on October 3, a deal was close to being made between Garcia and former champion and WBC #15 Brandon Ríos (34-3-1, 25 KOs) to take place in December 2017. On December 15, it was reported a fight was close to being made to take place on February 17, 2018, in Las Vegas. The fight was confirmed a week later to take place at the Mandalay Bay Events Center in Paradise, Nevada on Showtime. The last time Garcia fought at Mandalay Bay, he knocked out Amir Khan to unify the light welterweight division in 2012. In January 2018, WBC president Mauricio Sulaiman sanctioned the fight as a final eliminator for the WBC title. Sulaiman explained, "Champion Keith Thurman will return in a voluntary title defense, as he has recovered from his injury. Shawn Porter is the mandatory challenger, and Danny Garcia will fight Brandon Ríos in a final elimination bout for the second mandatory due to the inactivity of Thurman." Garcia boxed expertly in jabbing and countering Ríos on the move. The fight came to an end in round 9 with a 1-punch knockout in front of 6,240 fans in attendance. Ríos beat the 10 count, however referee Kenny Baylis stopped the fight. Garcia set Ríos up with a perfect right hand counter that knocked him down on his back. Ríos landed some good shots in the 6th round, but was mostly being hit clean. At the time of stoppage, Garcia was ahead by the scores 78–74, 79-73 and 79–73. After the fight, Shawn Porter jumped into the ring and tried calling out Garcia. Showtime interviewer Jim Gray did not like this as he believed Garcia deserved his moment and told Porter and his team to exit the ring. For the fight, Garcia made $1.25 million and Ríos had a $500,000 purse. According to CompuBox, Garcia landed 188 of 614 punches thrown (31%) and Ríos landed 109 of his 605 (18%). According to Nielsen Media Research, the fight averaged 516,000 viewers and peaked at 558,000 viewers on Showtime.

==== Garcia vs. Porter ====
On April 24, Thurman vacated his WBC title, forcing the organisation to mandate Porter vs. Garcia for the vacant title. On May 9, the WBC ordered purse bids to take place on May 25 if no agreement had been made, although the WBC president Mauricio Sulaiman confirmed talks were going well and a deal could be finalized before the bids. On the morning of May 25, Tom Brown informed the WBC a deal was in place for the bout to take place, thus the purse bids were cancelled. Brown stated the fight would take place at the Barclays Center in either August or September 2018. On July 24, the long-awaited announcement was finally made confirming the bout to take place at the Barclays Center on September 8, 2018. Before a crowd of 13,058 in attendance, Porter became a two-time world champion after defeating Garcia via unanimous decision. The official scores were 116–112, 115–113, 115–113 in Porter's favour. Porter started off slowly in the first four rounds but then came on in the second half and took over, dominating the remainder of the bout. Both boxers boxed in the first quarter of the fight. Porter had little success in doing this. He then made adjustments and began fighting more on the inside and connecting with body shots. One of Porter's main attributes was the way he doubled his jab. It appeared Garcia slowed down in the second half of the fight. This was likely due to the body attack from Porter. Garcia believed he won the fight, but did not complain about the result. IBF champion Errol Spence Jr. entered the ring during Porter's post-fight interview with Porter stating a fight between the pair would be the 'easiest to make' in boxing. CompuBox stats showed that Porter landed 180 of 742 punches thrown (24%) and Garcia landed with 168 of his 472 thrown (36%). For the fight, Porter earned $1 million and Garcia made $1.2 million. The fight averaged 619,000 viewers and peaked at 690,000 viewers.

==== Garcia vs. Granados ====
On November 13, 2018, PBC, along with their new partnership with FOX announced the 2019 first half schedule. It was announced that Garcia would return to the ring in April 2019 against Adrián Granados (20-6-2, 14 KOs, 1 NC). Granados had previously called out Garcia, before his loss to Porter. The fight was set to take place on April 20. On November 27, it was reported that Top Rank had offered García a guaranteed $3m purse to challenge WBO champion Terence Crawford on March 23, 2019, on ESPN PPV, which included an upside of the pay-per-view revenue. The offer was made to Garcia's father Angel from Top Rank's Todd duBoef and Carl Moretti. According to Moretti, Angel stated he would discuss the deal with Danny but then never got back to them. At the time Moretti said they offered the deal, there was a chance the Garcia Granados fight was already agreed upon. Garcia stopped Granados in the seventh round, after dropping him to the canvas several times during their bout.

=== Middleweight ===
==== Garcia vs. Lara ====
Garcia challenged Erislandy Lara for his WBA middleweight title at T-Mobile Arena in Las Vegas on September 14, 2024. Garcia lost via TKO after the ninth round had completed, when his corner stopped the contest.

=== Return to super welterweight ===
On September 3, 2025, Garcia announced plans to return to the Barclays Center for a final appearance during his retirement tour, where he was scheduled to face Daniel Gonzalez (22-4-1, 7 KOs). In a press release, he said, “The fans have supported me the whole way, since I first fought here, and have made Brooklyn feel like my home outside of Philly. “There’s nothing like a big fight night at Barclays Center. I had to do this show for the fans and show them how much I’ve appreciated them this entire time. The best way to say goodbye is by fighting here one last time and giving them a tremendous night of boxing full of rising young talent. It’s gonna be the DSG show in Brooklyn once again on October 18!” The fight was planned for 10 rounds in the super welterweight division. The event was considered the largest organized by Swift Promotions, which was founded in 2024. Garcia conveyed his intention to assist other fighters in realizing their aspirations, drawing inspiration from the support he received from Al Haymon throughout his career. He stated the necessity of maintaining a competitive mindset and motivation for his fight, identifying it as a pivotal opportunity. His main focus remained on his responsibilities as a fighter while also overseeing promotional duties to ensure all logistical elements of the event were properly arranged. Garcia referred to the Barclays Center as his "home in boxing," emphasizing its particular importance to him. Garcia weighed in at 153.6 pounds, while Gonzalez, marking his first fight above welterweight, came in at 153.4 pounds. Although it was not confirmed, Garcia hinted it may be his final bout. Garcia scored a one-punch knockout. It occurred 45 seconds into the fourth round with a left hook, leading to the referee stopping the fight as Gonzalez struggled to stand. His Garcia power shots landed throughout, which clearly affected Gonzalez. Despite hinting at retirement, Garcia left the door open for a potential return to the ring, stating there was a "high chance" he could fight again.

Garcia initially hesitated to announce his retirement but has now ruled out participating in future fights in Brooklyn. In the days after the fight, he noted that fame, adrenaline and financial incentives were significant challenges for him. He mentioned that "the price gotta be right" for him to consider fighting again.

== Exhibition ==
On October 9, 2026, Banner Promotions and Indistry Media announced Garcia would return in an exhibition against former junior welterweight champion Ruslan Provodnikov in an exhibition bout. The 8-round contest was scheduled to take place on November 7 at Watsco Center in Coral Gables, Florida.

== Honors and awards ==
Garcia was named the 2013 Philadelphia Pro Athlete of the Year by the Philadelphia Sports Writers Association.

== Professional boxing record ==
42 fights	38 wins	4 losses
By knockout	22	1
By decision	16	3

No.	Result	Record	Opponent	Type	Round, time	Date	Location	Notes
42	Win	38–4	Daniel Gonzalez	KO	4 (10), 0:45	Oct 18, 2025	Barclays Center, New York City, New York, U.S.	
41	Loss	37–4	Erislandy Lara	RTD	9 (12), 3:00	Sep 14, 2024	T-Mobile Arena, Paradise, Nevada, U.S.	For WBA middleweight title
40	Win	37–3	José Benavidez Jr.	MD	12	Jul 30, 2022	Barclays Center, New York City, New York, U.S.	
39	Loss	36–3	Errol Spence Jr.	UD	12	Dec 5, 2020	AT&T Stadium, Arlington, Texas, U.S.	For WBC and IBF welterweight titles
38	Win	36–2	Ivan Redkach	UD	12	Jan 25, 2020	Barclays Center, New York City, New York, U.S.	
37	Win	35–2	Adrián Granados	TKO	7 (12), 1:33	Apr 20, 2019	Dignity Health Sports Park, Carson, California, U.S.	Won vacant WBC Silver welterweight title
36	Loss	34–2	Shawn Porter	UD	12	Sep 8, 2018	Barclays Center, New York City, New York, U.S.	For vacant WBC welterweight title
35	Win	34–1	Brandon Ríos	TKO	9 (12), 2:25	Feb 17, 2018	Mandalay Bay Events Center, Paradise, Nevada, U.S.	
34	Loss	33–1	Keith Thurman	SD	12	Mar 4, 2017	Barclays Center, New York, City, New York, U.S.	Lost WBC welterweight title; For WBA (Super) welterweight title
33	Win	33–0	Samuel Vargas	TKO	7 (10), 2:27	Nov 12, 2016	Liacouras Center, Philadelphia, Pennsylvania, U.S.	
32	Win	32–0	Robert Guerrero	UD	12	Jan 23, 2016	Staples Center, Los Angeles, California, U.S.	Won vacant WBC welterweight title
31	Win	31–0	Paulie Malignaggi	TKO	9 (12), 2:22	Aug 1, 2015	Barclays Center, New York, City, New York, U.S.	
30	Win	30–0	Lamont Peterson	MD	12	Apr 11, 2015	Barclays Center, New York, City, New York, U.S.	
29	Win	29–0	Rod Salka	KO	2 (10), 2:31	Aug 9, 2014	Barclays Center, New York, City, New York, U.S.	
28	Win	28–0	Mauricio Herrera	MD	12	Mar 15, 2014	Coliseo Rubén Rodríguez, Bayamón, Puerto Rico	Retained WBA (Super), WBC, and The Ring light welterweight titles
27	Win	27–0	Lucas Matthysse	UD	12	Sep 14, 2013	MGM Grand Garden Arena, Paradise, Nevada, U.S.	Retained WBA (Super), WBC, and The Ring light welterweight titles
26	Win	26–0	Zab Judah	UD	12	Apr 27, 2013	Barclays Center, New York, City, New York, U.S.	Retained WBA (Super), WBC, and The Ring light welterweight titles
25	Win	25–0	Erik Morales	KO	4 (12), 1:23	Oct 20, 2012	Barclays Center, New York City, New York, U.S.	Retained WBA (Super), WBC, and The Ring light welterweight titles
24	Win	24–0	Amir Khan	TKO	4 (12), 2:28	Jul 14, 2012	Mandalay Bay Events Center, Paradise, Nevada, U.S.	Retained WBC light welterweight title; Won WBA (Super) and vacant The Ring light welterweight titles
23	Win	23–0	Erik Morales	UD	12	Mar 24, 2012	Reliant Arena, Houston, Texas, U.S.	Won vacant WBC light welterweight title
22	Win	22–0	Kendall Holt	SD	12	Oct 15, 2011	Staples Center, Los Angeles, California, U.S.	Won vacant WBO Inter-Continental light welterweight title
21	Win	21–0	Nate Campbell	UD	10	Apr 9, 2011	MGM Grand Garden Arena, Paradise, Nevada, U.S.	
20	Win	20–0	John Figueroa	KO	2 (8), 0:52	Feb 25, 2011	Four Points by Sheraton, San Diego, California, U.S.	
19	Win	19–0	Mike Arnaoutis	KO	4 (10), 1:05	Oct 8, 2010	South Philly Arena, Philadelphia, Pennsylvania, U.S.	
18	Win	18–0	Jorge Romero	TKO	9 (10), 1:16	Jul 30, 2010	Moon Palace Golf & Spa Resort, Cancún, Mexico	Won vacant WBC Youth interim welterweight title
17	Win	17–0	Christopher Fernández	TKO	7 (10), 1:18	May 7, 2010	South Philly Arena, Philadelphia, Pennsylvania, U.S.	
16	Win	16–0	Ashley Theophane	SD	10	Feb 26, 2010	Don Haskins Center, El Paso, Texas, U.S.	
15	Win	15–0	Enrique Colin	KO	2 (10), 0:55	Dec 2, 2009	Liacouras Center, Philadelphia, Pennsylvania, U.S.	Won WBC Youth Intercontinental light welterweight title
14	Win	14–0	Oscar León	TKO	3 (6), 2:59	Aug 22, 2009	Toyota Center, Houston, Texas, U.S.	
13	Win	13–0	Pavel Miranda	TKO	2 (8), 0:56	Jun 12, 2009	HP Pavilion, San Jose, California, U.S.	
12	Win	12–0	Humberto Tapia	UD	8	Apr 11, 2009	Mandalay Bay Events Center, Paradise, Nevada, U.S.	
11	Win	11–0	Cristian Favela	UD	8	Feb 28, 2009	Toyota Center, Houston, Texas, U.S.	
10	Win	10–0	José Alfredo Lugo	UD	8	Dec 6, 2008	MGM Grand Garden Arena, Paradise, Nevada, U.S.	
9	Win	9–0	Adan Hernández	UD	6	Nov 22, 2008	MGM Grand Garden Arena, Paradise, Nevada, U.S.	
8	Win	8–0	Deon Nash	TKO	3 (6), 2:59	Oct 18, 2008	Boardwalk Hall, Atlantic City, New Jersey, U.S.	
7	Win	7–0	Tyrone Wiggins	TKO	1 (4), 1:04	Sep 13, 2008	MGM Grand Garden Arena, Paradise, Nevada, U.S.	
6	Win	6–0	Julio Gamboa	UD	6	May 3, 2008	Home Depot Center, Carson, California, U.S.	
5	Win	5–0	Guadalupe Díaz	TKO	1 (6), 1:53	Apr 19, 2008	Thomas & Mack Center, Paradise, Nevada, U.S.	
4	Win	4–0	Charles Wade	TKO	1 (6), 0:43	Mar 15, 2008	Mandalay Bay Events Center, Paradise, Nevada, U.S.	
3	Win	3–0	Marlo Cortéz	KO	2 (4), 1:07	Jan 11, 2008	Morongo Casino Resort & Spa, Cabazon, California, U.S.	
2	Win	2–0	Jesús Villareal	TKO	2 (4), 2:28	Dec 8, 2007	MGM Grand Garden Arena, Paradise, Nevada, U.S.	
1	Win	1–0	Mike Denby	KO	1 (4), 1:08	Nov 17, 2007	Borgata, Atlantic City, New Jersey, U.S.	

== Titles in boxing ==
=== Major world titles ===
- WBA (Super) light welterweight champion (140 lbs)
- WBA (Regular) light welterweight champion (140 lbs)
- WBC welterweight champion (147 lbs)
- WBC light welterweight champion (140 lbs)

=== The Ring magazine titles ===
- The Ring light welterweight champion (140 lbs)

=== Interim/Silver world titles ===
- WBC Silver welterweight champion (147 lbs)
- WBC Youth interim welterweight champion (147 lbs)

=== Regional/International titles ===
- WBC Youth Inter-Continental light welterweight champion (140 lbs)
- WBO Inter-Continental light welterweight champion (140 lbs)

=== Honorary titles ===
- WBC Emeritus Champion

== See also ==
- List of Puerto Rican boxing world champions

Sporting positions
Amateur boxing titles
Previous: Michael Evans	U.S. lightweight champion 2006	Next: Diego Magdaleno
Regional boxing titles
New title	WBC Youth Intercontinental light welterweight champion December 2, 2009 – July 2010; Vacated	Vacant Title next held by Steve Claggett
Vacant Title last held by Ed Paredes	WBC Youth light welterweight champion Interim title July 30, 2010 – October 2010; Vacated	Vacant Title next held by Jorge Páez Jr.
Vacant Title last held by Lucas Matthysse	WBO Inter-Continental light welterweight champion October 15, 2011 – January 2012; Vacated	Vacant Title next held by Ruslan Provodnikov
Vacant Title last held by Qudratillo Abduqaxorov	WBC Silver welterweight champion April 20, 2019 – August 2020; Vacated	Vacant Title next held by Shawn Porter
World boxing titles
Vacant Title last held by Érik Morales	WBC light welterweight champion March 24, 2012 – June 11, 2015; Stripped	Vacant Title next held by Viktor Postol
Preceded by Amir Khan	WBA light welterweight champion Super title July 14, 2012 – September 11, 2015; Vacated	Vacant Title next held by Adrien Broner
Vacant Title last held by Manny Pacquiao	The Ring light welterweight champion July 14, 2012 – August 10, 2015; Vacated	Vacant Title next held by Terence Crawford
Vacant Title last held by Floyd Mayweather Jr.	WBC welterweight champion January 23, 2016 – March 4, 2017	Succeeded by Keith Thurman
Awards
Previous: Deontay Wilder; KO1 Bermane Stiverne	PBC Knockout of the Year; TKO9 Brandon Ríos; 2018	Next: Deontay Wilder; KO1 Dominic Breazeale
