= Adrián Granados =

American boxer (born 1989)

Personal information
- Nickname: Tigre
- Born: Adrián René Granados; August 14, 1989 (age 37) Cicero, Illinois, U.S.
- Height: 5 ft 9 in (1.75 m)
- Weight: Lightweight; Light welterweight; Welterweight; Light middleweight

Boxing career
- Reach: 71 in (182 cm)
- Stance: Orthodox

Boxing record
- Total fights: 34
- Wins: 21
- Win by KO: 15
- Losses: 9
- Draws: 3
- No contests: 1

Adrián René Granados (born August 14, 1989) is an American-born Mexican professional boxer.

== Amateur career ==
Granados had an amateur record of 75–12. He won the 2008 Junior Olympic State and Regional Championship. That same year, he ranked 5th in the national rankings at junior welterweight. In 2009, he took both the Junior Golden Gloves National Championships and then won the bronze medal at the Ringside World Championships. Granados was also on the Mexican Olympic Team as a reserve.

== Professional career ==
=== Granados vs. Titsworth ===
On September 17, 2011, Granados beat veteran Trenton Titsworth at the UIC Pavilion in Chicago, Illinois.

=== Granados vs. Diaz ===
On November 21, 2014, Granados lost a majority decision to Félix Díaz for the WBC Central American Boxing Federation title.

=== Granados vs. Solomon ===
In his next bout, Granados fought on the undercard of Floyd Mayweather Jr. vs. Manny Pacquiao on May 2, 2015, where he lost to Brad Solomon by split decision.

=== Granados vs. Broner ===
His fifth defeat came against his good friend, former four-division world champion Adrien Broner on February 18, 2017. Granados suffered the third split decision loss of his professional career; a scorecard of 97–93 to Granados was overruled by scores of 97-93 and 96–94 in favor of Broner. Broner praised his opponent after the fight, saying "Adrian Granados is a world-class fighter. A lot of guys duck him, but I wanted to fight him because that's what I'm about."

=== Granados vs. Porter ===
His sixth loss came in his next fight, against former IBF welterweight champion Shawn Porter on November 4, 2017. Granados suffered his first unanimous decision loss, with all three judges scoring the bout 117–111 to Porter.

=== Granados vs. Garcia ===
Granados also suffered back-to-back losses in 2019 in his 30th and 31st fights, against former two-division champion Danny García, and former IBF lightweight champion Robert Easter Jr. Garcia was ranked as the #1 welterweight by the WBC at the time. García was the first opponent to stop Granados, who lost by seventh-round technical knockout.

=== Granados vs. Easter Jr ===
Easter Jr. defeated him by ten-round unanimous decision, with scores of 97–93, 98–92, and 100–90 in favor of Easter Jr. The scorecard of 100-90 meant that one judge did not have Granados winning a single round, which attracted controversy and criticism. In his post-fight interview, Granados was exasperated, saying "Honestly, I’m speechless. I felt like I won the fight... It seemed like they already had a victor. That 100-90? Come on now.”

=== Granados vs. Sanchez ===
On May 1, 2021, Granados battled to a majority draw, the third draw of his career, against José Luis Sánchez on the undercard of Andy Ruiz Jr. vs. Chris Arreola.

=== Granados vs. Benn ===
On June 14, 2021, it was announced that Granados would be facing undefeated Conor Benn on July 31, 2021, as part of Fight Camp in Brentwood, England. However, the fight was postponed after Benn tested positive for COVID-19. On August 14, 2021, it was announced that the fight would take place on September 4 at Emerald Headingley Stadium in Leeds, England on the undercard of Mauricio Lara vs. Josh Warrington II. Benn was ranked #11 by the WBC, #12 by the WBA and #13 by the IBF at the time. On the night, Benn outworked and outboxed his opponent over the ten-round distance to earn a unanimous decision, with scores of 100–90, 99-91 and 97–93 in his favour. Granados had seemingly been content to just stay in the fight and make no real attempt at winning, and by the final round had become so passive that Benn shouted at him, dropping his hands and banging his legs in an invitation for Granados to stand and fight.

== Professional boxing record ==
34 fights	21 wins	9 losses
By knockout	15	1
By decision	6	8
Draws	3	
No contests	1	

No.	Result	Record	Opponent	Type	Round, time	Date	Location	Notes
34	Loss	21–9–3 (1)	(United Kingdom) Conor Benn	UD	10	Sep 4, 2021	(United Kingdom) Emerald Headingley Stadium, Leeds, England	For WBA Continental (Europe) welterweight title
33	Draw	21–8–3 (1)	(United States) José Luis Sánchez	MD	8	May 1, 2021	(United States) Dignity Health Sports Park, Carson, California, U.S.	
32	Win	21–8–2 (1)	(Mexico) Arturo Herrera	TKO	2 (8), 1:37	Feb 6, 2021	Tzurumutaro, Michoacán de Ocampo, Mexico	
31	Loss	20–8–2 (1)	(United States) Robert Easter Jr.	UD	10	Oct 26, 2019	(United States) Santander Arena, Reading, Pennsylvania, U.S.	
30	Loss	20–7–2 (1)	(United States) Danny García	TKO	7 (12), 1:33	Apr 20, 2019	(United States) Dignity Health Sports Park, Carson, California, U.S.	For vacant WBC Silver welterweight title
29	Win	20–6–2 (1)	(Mexico) Adalberto Borquez	TKO	3 (8), 1:18	Sep 14, 2018	Polideportivo Juan S. Millan, Culiacan, Mexico	
28	Win	19–6–2 (1)	(Mexico) Luis Fernando Valdez	KO	3 (8), 1:37	Aug 3, 2018	Polideportivo Juan S. Millan, Culiacan, Mexico	
27	NC	18–6–2 (1)	(Dominican Republic) Javier Fortuna	NC	4 (10), 2:50	Jun 16, 2018	(United States) The Ford Center at The Star, Frisco, Texas, U.S.	Fortuna accidentally injured when he fell out of the ring
26	Loss	18–6–2	(United States) Shawn Porter	UD	12	Nov 4, 2017	(United States) Barclays Center, New York City, New York, U.S.	For vacant WBC Silver welterweight title
25	Loss	18–5–2	(United States) Adrien Broner	SD	10	Feb 18, 2017	(United States) Cintas Center, Cincinnati, Ohio, U.S.	
24	Win	18–4–2	(Nicaragua) Ariel Vasquez	UD	8	Jul 16, 2016	(United States) Celebrity Theater, Phoenix, U.S.	
23	Win	17–4–2	(United States) Amir Imam	TKO	8 (10), 2:34	Nov 28, 2015	Videotron Centre, Quebec City, Quebec, Canada	
22	Win	16–4–2	(Japan) Gaku Takahashi	UD	8	Sep 19, 2015	(United States) Quiet Cannon, Montebello, U.S.	
21	Win	15–4–2	(United States) Christian Steele	RTD	4 (8)	Aug 22, 2015	(United States) Horseshoe Casino, Hammond, U.S.	
20	Win	14–4–2	(United States) Dedrick Bell	TKO	3 (6)	Aug 8, 2015	(United States) Chase Hotel, Saint Louis	
19	Loss	13–4–2	(United States) Brad Solomon	SD	10	May 2, 2015	(United States) MGM Grand Garden Arena, Paradise, Nevada, U.S.	
18	Loss	13–3–2	(Dominican Republic) Félix Díaz	MD	10	Nov 21, 2014	(United States) Hard Rock Hotel & Casino, Tulsa, Oklahoma, U.S.	
