= Save Mart Center =

Multi-purpose arena in Fresno, California, U.S.

Save Mart Center at Fresno State

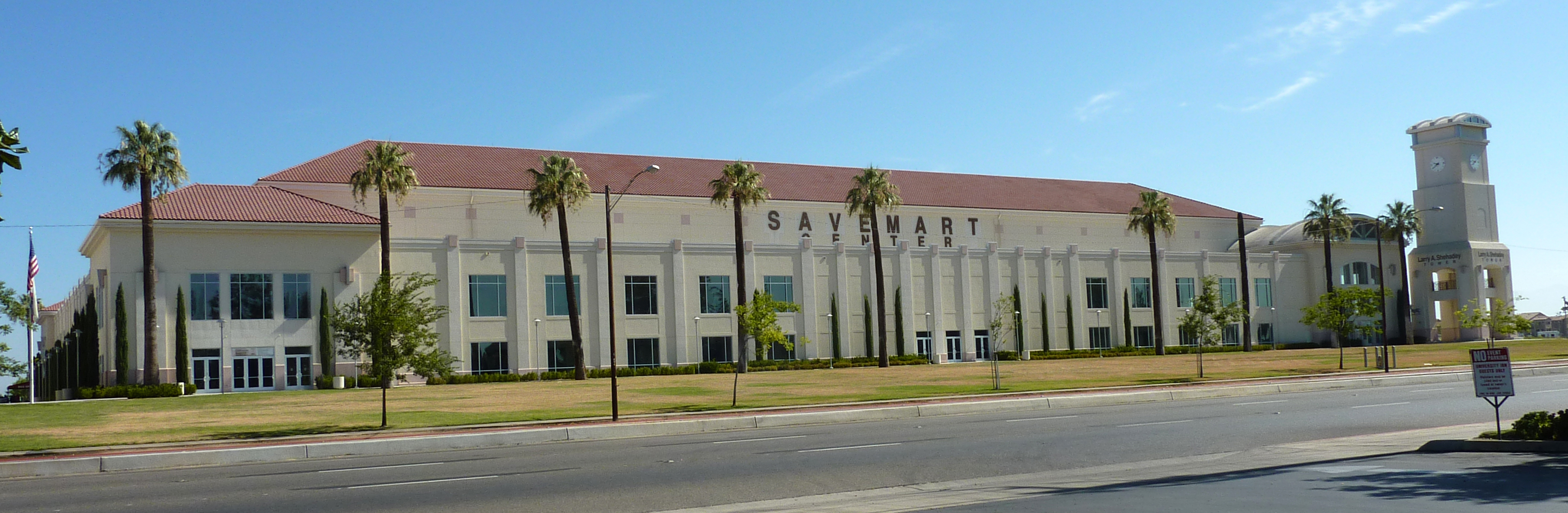
- Save Mart Center, 2009

- Location in California Location in the United States
- Address: 2650 East Shaw Avenue
- Location: Fresno, California, U.S.
- Coordinates: 36.809722°N 119.738611°W
- Owner: California State University, Fresno
- Operator: Legends Global
- Capacity: Concerts, Professional wrestling, Boxing – 16,182; Basketball – 15,596; Hockey – 14,224; Rodeo – 12,368
- Executive suites: 40
- Surface: Multi-surface

Construction
- Groundbreaking: May 8, 2001
- Opened: November 27, 2003
- Cost: $103 million ($180 million in 2025 dollars)
- Architect: Sink Combs Dethlefs
- Project manager: International Facilities Group
- Structural engineers: John A. Martin & Associates
- Services engineers: M–E Engineers, Inc.
- General contractor: Clark Construction Group Inc.

Tenants
- Fresno State Bulldogs (NCAA) (2003–present); Fresno Falcons (ECHL) (2003–2008)

Save Mart Center at Fresno State is a multi-purpose arena, on the campus of California State University, Fresno (Fresno State), located in Fresno, California. An open house was held for the community on November 5, 2003, with the official ribbon cutting following on November 27, 2003. It is home to the Fresno State Bulldogs men's and women's basketball teams, women's volleyball team and wrestling team.

It is the former home of the Fresno Falcons ice hockey team for their first five seasons in the ECHL (2003–08); prior to the opening of the building, they played at Selland Arena.

It is also a concert destination, with its first performance featuring opera tenor Andrea Bocelli.

Financing for the project was provided through revenue, from corporate sponsorships, private gifts, leasing of luxury suites, sale of club seating and personal seat licenses, as well as revenue from advertising and signage agreements.

== Construction ==
- Sink Combs Dethlefs, conceptual designs, project architect
- International Facilities Group (IFG), construction monitor, project manager
- Clark Construction Group, LLC, general contractor
- M–E Engineers, Inc., mechanical, electrical & plumbing engineer
- John A. Martin & Associates, structural engineer

== Telecommunications ==
- SBC DataComm Inc., Networking and Phone System conceptual designs, final production design, implementation, project managed
- Duval E. Davis Jr. Sr. Project Manager

== Facilities ==
Save Mart Center encompasses approximately 40,000 m^{2} (430,000 ft^{2}) on three primary levels; an event level and two concourses, plus a club level mezzanine. The facility includes 32 revenue-generating suites and eight party suites, located on the main concourse level. Seating capacities are approximately 15,596 for basketball, 14,224 for hockey, 8,000 for half-house concerts, 15,500 for end-stage concerts, and 18,000 for center-stage concerts.

The arena's main exterior landmark is the 37 m (93 ft) Larry A. Shehadey Clock Tower. 13 stories in-all, it was named for the founder of Producers Dairy Foods, a Fresno-based dairy company, who donated US$3 million towards construction. The lobby at the arena's southeast entrance is named after Shehadey’s late wife, Elayne Shehadey.

The majority of the funding for the facility came from two sources. Save Mart Supermarkets paid US$40 million for 20 year naming rights, and the Pepsi Bottling Group paid a similar sum for exclusive, indefinite beverage dispensing rights. Total construction costs exceeded US$100 million and when completed, represented the largest privately funded complex of any university in the United States.

The Bulldog Foundation donated money for the following amenities at Save Mart Center:

- The Bulldog Foundation Community Room, which displays the names of past presidents, current officers, lifetime honorees and annual top fund raisers, is used for show catering, premium seating holder dining, and is also available for rent.
- The Bronze Bulldog at the Shehadey Lobby. Created by the Visalia-based art foundry, EMI, the massive bronze bulldog statue has dimensions of 3 m (10 ft) high, 2 m (7 ft) wide, 3 m (9 ft) long, weighing 1,905 kg (4,200 lb). Statue onlookers will see engraved on its mounted plaque:

This is our mascot and he ain't no hound.

He's an English bull and weighs lots of pounds

He's got two rows of teeth and a terrible frown

Hey, nobody’s kicking our dog around!!!

- Nine time capsule boxes were placed in the base of the massive Bulldog statue early in 2004. The contents of capsules were chosen to represent all aspects of Fresno State University, including the Bulldog Foundation, administration, alumni, students and athletics. The capsules are scheduled to be opened in early 2054.
- Save Mart Center's display cases, located on the upper and main concourses, exhibits equipment and memorabilia of each of the current Bulldog sport activities. Additionally, the display case in the northwest corner spotlights the academic success of Fresno State’s student athletes.
- The Bulldog Walkway is a permanent, on-campus tribute to the California State University, Fresno alumni, graduates and friends. It is located on the north side of Save Mart Center with the first three tiles in honour of Colonel Rick Husband, who died in the Space Shuttle Columbia accident, Lieutenant Commander Otis Vincent Tolbert, who died in the 911 attack on the Pentagon and United Airlines Flight 93 passenger, Todd Morgan Beamer. All were Fresno State alumni. Expected to eventually be extended throughout the campus, the walkway consists of personalized tiles and bricks intended to leave a lasting impression to those who use it.
- The Bulldog Shop souvenir store is located on the arena's northeast lobby. It will only be open to sell Fresno State merchandise and apparel during university events.

== Concerts ==
Several major entertainers have performed at the venue including Beyoncé, RBD, Carrie Underwood, AC/DC, The Rolling Stones, Eagles, Paul McCartney, The Who, Billy Joel, Madonna, Prince, Jonas Brothers, Maná, Miley Cyrus, Drake, Bruno Mars, Hannah Montana, Britney Spears, JoJo Siwa, Shania Twain, Justin Timberlake, Taylor Swift, Kelly Clarkson, Chris Brown, Gwen Stefani, Paramore, Miranda Lambert, Jordin Sparks, Justin Bieber, Luke Bryan, Brad Paisley, Little Big Town, Jay Z, Florida Georgia Line, Bon Jovi, Andrea Bocelli, Ariana Grande, Selena Gomez, Twenty One Pilots, Blake Shelton, Garth Brooks, Janet Jackson, Foo Fighters, Pearl Jam, Metallica, Trans-Siberian Orchestra, & many others. The arena has also played host to music festivals, including the Winter Jam Tour, the Vans Warped Tour & the Mayhem Festival.

== Sports events ==
The first athletic event held at Save Mart Center took place when the Rainbow Wahine of Hawaii took on the Fresno State Bulldogs in women's NCAA volleyball in October 2003.

Officials from the Fresno Falcons of the West Coast Hockey League announced on March 18, 2002, that the Falcons would make Save Mart Center at Fresno State their home ice beginning with the 2003 season. The Western Athletic Conference men's basketball tournament was held at the center in 2004, as well as WWE's Royal Rumble 2005 and WWE Live Events, including ECW/SmackDown 6/30/09 where 3 superstars made their debut, including multiple time WWE Champion, Sheamus. Also, on Feb 17th, 2004, a SmackDown show featuring a newly crowned WWE Champion Eddie Guerrero, had his celebration ceremony at Save Mart Center, and was featured on WWE DVD "Legendary Moments".

Save Mart Center's first arena football game was held on July 19, 2008. The Central Valley Coyotes defeated the Boise Burn 55–50. Both teams were members of the now defunct AF2, the former developmental league for the Arena Football League.

Save Mart Center has hosted five NBA preseason games. The first game was in 2003-2004 when the Los Angeles Lakers hosted the Sacramento Kings; the Lakers defeated the Kings 105–80. The second was in 2004-2005 with the Sacramento Kings taking on the Phoenix Suns; the Suns defeated the Kings 100–88. The third was in 2005-2006 when the Lakers hosted the Utah Jazz; the Lakers defeated the Jazz 95–85. The Los Angeles Lakers hosted another game in the 2008 preseason against the Los Angeles Clippers, with the Clippers beating the Lakers 107–80. The Los Angeles Lakers hosted another game in the 2012 preseason against the Golden State Warriors, with the Warriors beating the Lakers 110–83.

Save Mart Center hosted an NHL preseason game on September 23, 2006. The San Jose Sharks took on the Anaheim Ducks, winning 4–3. Joe Thornton scored the game-winning goal for the Sharks; Anaheim went on to win its first Stanley Cup Championship later that season.

Save Mart Center hosted the Artur Beterbiev-Enrico Kölling boxing match for the IBF Light Heavyweight belt on November 11, 2017. It hosted the Jerwin Ancajas-Jonas Sultan boxing match for the IBF Super Flyweight belt on May 26, 2018. It hosted the boxing match between Jose Ramirez and Antonio Orozco for the WBC Junior Welterweight belt on September 14, 2018.

Save Mart Center hosted the Strikeforce: Tank vs. Buentello mixed martial arts (MMA) event on October 6, 2006. It hosted the inaugural ShoMMA on May 15, 2009. It hosted Bellator 125 on September 19, 2014, Bellator 148 on January 29, 2016 and Bellator 156 on June 17, 2016. It hosted UFC Fight Night 123 on December 9, 2017.

Since 2004, the arena is a stop for PBR's Built Ford Tough Series for the Table Mountain Casino Invitational.

In March 2012, the Save Mart Center hosted the West Regional of the NCAA Division I women's basketball tournament. The Stanford Cardinal won the regional and advanced to the 2012 NCAA women's Final Four.

Attendance for Bulldogs men's basketball has tailed off significantly since the early 2000s. In recent years, Fresno State has covered the upper level with a tarp. As a result, while Fresno State lists the official capacity for basketball as 15,596, the "actual" capacity is somewhat smaller.

== See also ==
- List of NCAA Division I basketball arenas

| Preceded by Wachovia Center | Home of the Royal Rumble; 2005 | Succeeded by American Airlines Arena |
