= Amir Imam =

American boxer (born 1990)

Personal information
- Nickname: Young Master
- Born: Amir Imam; November 5, 1990 (age 35) Albany, New York, U.S.
- Height: 5 ft 10 1/2 in (179 cm)
- Weight: Light welterweight

Boxing career
- Reach: 74 in (188 cm)
- Stance: Orthodox

Boxing record
- Total fights: 25
- Wins: 22
- Win by KO: 19
- Losses: 3

Amir Imam (born November 5, 1990) is an American professional boxer who challenged once for the WBC super lightweight title in 2018.

== Professional career ==
=== Imam vs. Granados ===
Imam turned professional in 2011 and won 18 consecutive fights before getting stopped by Adrián Granados.

=== Imam vs. Ramirez ===
He would go on to win his next 3 fights before earning his first world title opportunity against José Ramírez which he ultimately lost on points. The scorecards read 120–108, 117-111 and 115–113 in favor of Ramirez.

=== Imam vs. Molina ===
On February 22, 2020, Imam fought Javier Molina. Imam was outpointed by Molina in an eighth rounder, losing 74–78 on two and 73–79 on the third scorecard.

== Professional boxing record ==
25 fights	22 wins	3 losses
By knockout	19	1
By decision	3	2

No.	Result	Record	Opponent	Type	Round, time	Date	Location	Notes
25	Loss	22–3	Javier Molina	UD	8	Feb 22, 2020	MGM Grand Garden Arena, Las Vegas, Nevada, U.S.	
24	Win	22–2	Marcos Mojica	KO	4 (8), 0:56	Nov 8, 2019	Chukchansi Park, Fresno, California, U.S.	
23	Loss	21–2	José Ramírez	UD	12	Mar 17, 2018	The Theater at Madison Square Garden, New York City, New York, U.S.	For vacant WBC light welterweight title
22	Win	21–1	Johnny Garcia	RTD	4 (10), 3:00	Nov 11, 2017	Save Mart Arena, Fresno, California, U.S.	
21	Win	20–1	Jose Vidal Soto	TKO	3 (10), 1:46	Apr 27, 2017	Casa de los Clubes, Santo Domingo, Dominican Republic	
20	Win	19–1	Wilfredo Acuna	TKO	3 (6), 1:11	Jul 2, 2016	Teamsters Hall, Pittsburgh, Pennsylvania, U.S.	
19	Loss	18–1	Adrián Granados	TKO	8 (10), 2:34	Nov 28, 2015	Centre Videotron, Quebec City, Canada	
18	Win	18–0	Fernando Angulo	KO	4 (12), 0:56	Jul 18, 2015	Don Haskins Convention Center, El Paso, Texas, U.S.	
17	Win	17–0	Walter Castillo	UD	10	Apr 18, 2015	StubHub Center, Carson, California, U.S.	Retained WBC Continental Americas super lightweight title
16	Win	16–0	Fidel Maldonado	TKO	5 (10), 2:59	Jan 17, 2015	MGM Grand Garden Arena, Las Vegas, Nevada, U.S.	Won vacant WBC Continental Americas super lightweight title
15	Win	15–0	Santos Benavides	KO	6 (8), 1:46	Dec 13, 2014	Fair Grounds, Tampa, Florida, U.S.	
14	Win	14–0	Yordenis Ugás	UD	8	May 10, 2014	USC Galen Center, Los Angeles, California, U.S.	
13	Win	13–0	Jared Robinson	TKO	4 (10), 1:59	Feb 21, 2014	Wolstein Center, Cleveland, Ohio, U.S.	
12	Win	12–0	Sergio Perez	KO	1 (10), 0:52	Dec 20, 2013	Resorts World Casino, New York City, New York, U.S.	Won vacant WBA-NABA (USA) super lightweight title
11	Win	11–0	Jose Antonio Rodriguez	TKO	2 (10), 2:49	Oct 19, 2013	Club Calero, Santo Domingo Este, Dominican Republic	
10	Win	10–0	Miguelo Tavarez	TKO	2 (8), 3:00	May 24, 2013	Club Maquiteria, Santo Domingo, Dominican Republic	
9	Win	9–0	Jeremy Bryan	TKO	2 (8), 2:13	Apr 12, 2013	Treasure Island Casino, Las Vegas, Nevada, U.S.	
8	Win	8–0	Alejandro Lebron	RTD	2 (6), 3:00	Mar 9, 2013	Coliseo Carlos 'Teo' Cruz, Santo Domingo, Dominican Republic	
7	Win	7–0	Franklin Frias	TKO	2 (8), 1:52	Feb 16, 2013	Gimnasio Joan Guzman, Santo Domingo, Dominican Republic	
6	Win	6–0	Tony Walker	TKO	2 (6), 2:59	Nov 16, 2012	Jai Alai Fronton, Miami, Florida, U.S.	
5	Win	5–0	Kelvin Williams	TKO	1 (6), 2:59	Jun 23, 2012	Seminole Hard Rock Hotel and Casino, Hollywood, Florida, U.S.	
4	Win	4–0	John Willoughby	TKO	2 (4), 1:17	Apr 14, 2012	Miami Jai Alai Fronton, Miami, Florida, U.S.	
3	Win	3–0	Devarise Crayton	TKO	2 (4), 1:19	Feb 10, 2012	Community Center, Palm Bay, Florida, U.S.	
2	Win	2–0	Joseph Fernandez	TKO	4 (4), 2:50	Dec 9, 2011	Kissimmee Civic Center, Kissimmee, Florida, U.S.	
1	Win	1–0	Christian Steele	UD	4	Nov 5, 2011	Seminole Hard Rock Hotel and Casino, Hollywood, Florida, U.S.	
