= Danny Gonzalez (boxer) =

American professional boxer (born 1990)

Daniel Gonzalez
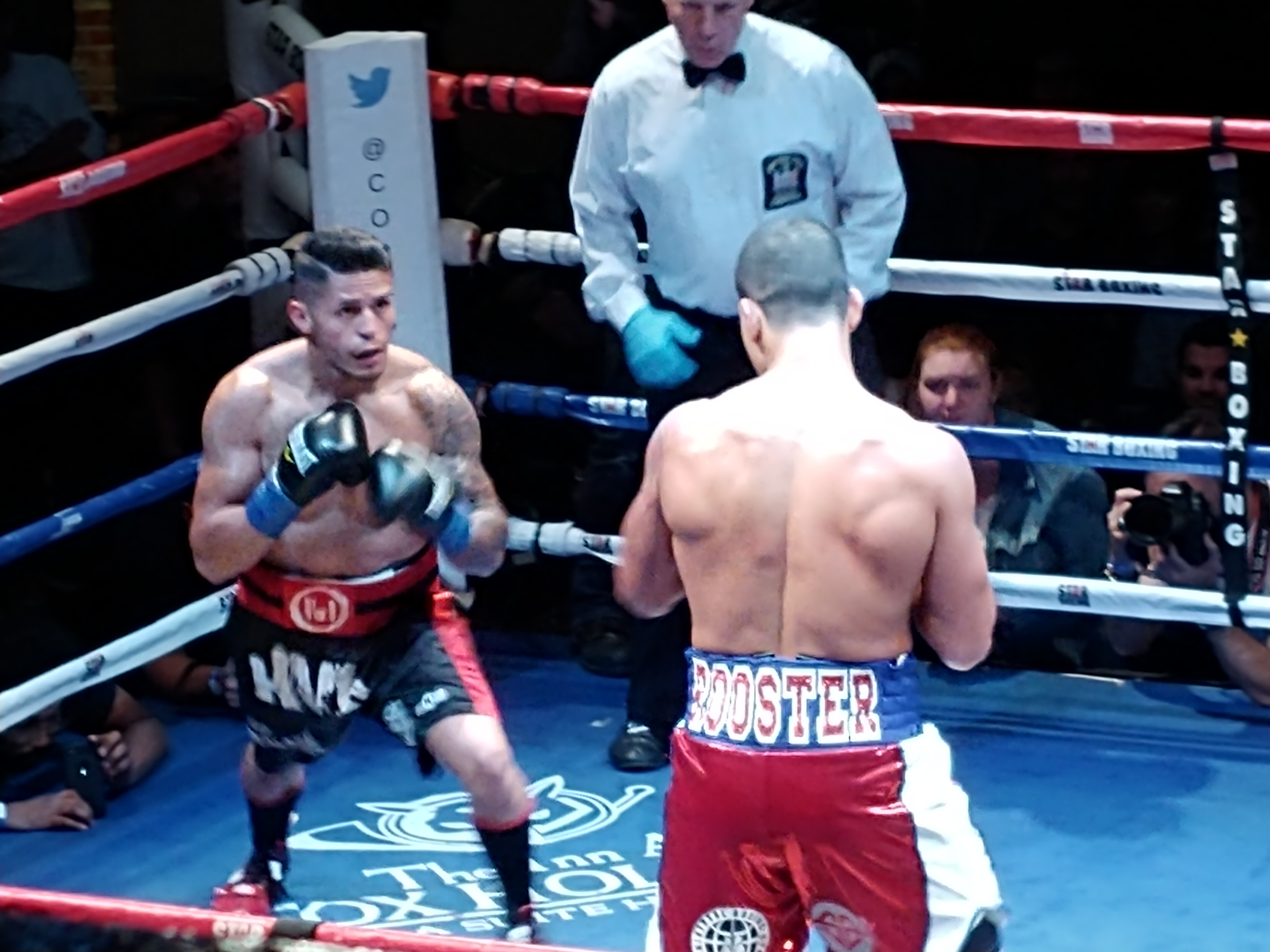
- Danny Gonzalez (right) facing Johnny Hernandez in September 2018

Personal information
- Nickname: El Gallo
- Nationality: American
- Born: Daniel Gonzalez; January 13, 1990 (age 36) Woodhaven, Queens, New York, U.S.
- Height: 5 ft 8 in (173 cm)

Boxing career
- Reach: 68 in (173 cm)
- Stance: Orthodox

Boxing record
- Total fights: 28
- Wins: 22
- Win by KO: 7
- Losses: 5
- Draws: 1

Daniel Gonzalez (born January 13, 1990), known as "El Gallo", is an American professional boxer from Woodhaven, Queens, New York. Gonzalez has competed professionally from 2012 to 2025 and has held the IBF USBA Welterweight title and the WBC FECARBOX Super Lightweight title.

== Early life ==
Gonzalez is from Woodhaven in Queens, New York. Star Boxing has described him as training out of Queens and having developed at Universal Boxing Gym.

== Professional career ==
Gonzalez made his professional debut on September 22, 2012 in Queens, New York.

In January 2019, he faced Chris Algieri at Madison Square Garden Theater in New York, losing a decision in a bout billed for the vacant WBO International super lightweight title.

In July 2019, Gonzalez won the vacant WBC FECARBOX super lightweight title against Jerome Conquest at The Paramount in Huntington, New York, and later defended the title in November 2019 against Johnny Hernandez at the same venue.

In October 2021, he fought Petros Ananyan at Barclays Center in Brooklyn, New York, losing by decision.

After returning to the ring in February 2024 with a win over Keane McMahon in Huntington, New York, Gonzalez won the vacant IBF USBA welterweight title with a unanimous decision over Michael Anderson on October 12, 2024 at Prudential Center in Newark, New Jersey.

On October 18, 2025, Gonzalez faced former world champion Danny Garcia at Barclays Center in Brooklyn in a super welterweight bout, losing by fourth-round knockout/technical knockout. Gonzalez suffered multiple fractures as a result of the match, including a broken jaw from the first punch he took and a broken ankle and leg after Garcia landed the left hook.

Gonzalez has participated in 28 fights, winning 22 (7 by knockout) and losing 5 (2 by knockout). One of the fights resulted in a draw.

== Championships ==
- IBF USBA Welterweight Champion (won vacant title in 2024)
- WBC FECARBOX Super Lightweight Champion (won vacant title in 2019; one recorded defense in 2019)
- ABO Intercontinental super lightweight titleholder.

== Professional boxing record ==
28 fights	22 wins	5 losses
By knockout	7	2
By decision	15	3
Draws	1	

No.	Result	Opponent	Date	Location	Notes
28	Loss	Danny Garcia	Oct 18, 2025	Barclays Center, New York City, New York	
27	Win	Michael Anderson	October 2024	Prudential Center, Newark	IBF USBA Welter (vacant)
26	Win	Keane McMahon	February 2024	Paramount Theatre, Huntington, New York	
25	Loss	Paulo Cesar Galdino	February 2022	Carnesecca Arena, St John's University, New York City	
24	Loss	Petros Ananyan	October 2021	Barclays Center, New York City, New York	
23	Win	Evincii Dixon	April 2021	2300 Arena, Philadelphia	
22	Win	Johnny Hernandez	November 2019	Paramount Theatre, Huntington, New York	WBC FECARBOX Super Light
21	Win	Jerome Conquest	July 2019	Paramount Theatre, Huntington, New York	WBC FECARBOX Super Light (vacant)
20	Loss	Chris Algieri	January 2019	Madison Square Garden Theater, New York	WBO International Super Light (vacant)
19	Win	Johnny Hernandez	September 2018	Paramount Theatre, Huntington, New York	
18	Win	Justin Savi	June 2018	Paramount Theatre, Huntington, New York	
17	Win	Juan de la Cruz Rodriguez	March 2018	Paramount Theatre, Huntington, New York	
16	Loss	Danny O'Connor	Nov 11, 2017	Mohegan Sun Casino, Uncasville	WBC International Silver Super Light (vacant)
15	Win	Samuel Amoako	May 2017	Mohegan Sun Casino, Uncasville	
14	Win	Jerome Rodriguez	March 2017	Paramount Theatre, Huntington, New York	
13	Win	Curtis Niko Morton	June 2016	Paramount Theatre, Huntington, New York	
12	Win	Carlos Aguilera Martinez	April 2016	Paramount Theatre, Huntington, New York	
11	Win	Justin Johnson	October 2015	Paramount Theatre, Huntington, New York	
10	Win	Carl McNickles	June 2015	Paramount Theatre, Huntington, New York	
9	Win	Ken Alvarez	February 2015	Paramount Theatre, Huntington, New York	
8	Win	Malik Jackson	November 2014	Five Star Banquet, Long Island City, New York City	
7	Win	Ray Velez	July 2014	BB King Blues Club & Grill, New York	
6	Draw	Ray Velez	February 2014	Roseland Ballroom, New York	
5	Win	Kamal Muhammad	December 2013	BB King Blues Club & Grill, New York	
4	Win	Anthony Smith	June 2013	Five Star Banquet, Long Island City, New York City	
3	Win	Carlos Nieves	March 2013	Birchwood Manor, Whippany	
2	Win	Bernel Ayers	January 2013	Cordon Bleu, Woodhaven, New York City	
1	Win	Anthony Smith	September 2012	Resorts World Casino, New York City	
