= Sergey Vorobiev =

Russian super welterweight boxer (b. 1994)

Personal information
- Born: Sergey Alekseyevich Vorobiev; 3 October 1994 (age 31) Shlisselburg, Russia
- Height: 5 ft 10+1/2 (179 cm)
- Weight: Super welterweight

Boxing career
- Reach: 69 in (175 cm)
- Stance: Orthodox

Boxing record
- Total fights: 23
- Wins: 20
- Win by KO: 14
- Losses: 2
- Draws: 1

Sergey Alekseyevich Vorobiev (Russian: Сергей Алексеевич Воробьев; born 3 October 1994) is a Russian professional boxer. As of 2018 he held the Russian super welterweight title. He is best known for ending Konstantin Ponomarev's unbeaten record.

Vorobiev turned pro in 2016 when he stopped Sergey Dyachkov in the third round. He went on to win five more fights, all in the early rounds. In July 2018, Vorobiev fought the undefeated Konstantin Ponomarev for the vacant Russian title. It took place on the Oleksandr Usyk vs Murat Gassiev undercard. Vorobiev won a close split decision over Ponomarev, ending his unbeaten record. In his most recent fight, Vorobiev outpointed Argentinian boxer Abel Nicolas Adriel after eight rounds.

== Professional boxing record ==
23 fights	20 wins	2 losses
By knockout	14	0
By decision	6	2
Draws	1	

No.	Result	Record	Opponent	Type	Round, time	Date	Location	Notes
9	Win	9-0	Vazir Tamoyan	UD	8	12 Dec 2019	Ivan Yarygin Sports Palace, Krasnoyarsk, Russia	
8	Win	8–0	(Argentina) Abel Nicolas Adriel	UD	8	8 Dec 2018	RCC Boxing Academy, Ekaterinburg, Russia	
7	Win	7–0	(Russia) Konstantin Ponomarev	SD	10	21 Jul 2018	Olympic Stadium (Moscow), Moscow, Russia	Won vacant Russian Super welterweight title
6	Win	6–0	(Russia) Robert Zopunyan	TKO	6 (8) 0:27	17 Mar 2018	Floyd Mayweather Boxing Academy, Zhukovka, Russia	
5	Win	5–0	(Russia) Rinat Khalimov	TKO	2 (6) 0:30	9 Sep 2017	Khimik Stadium (Kemerovo), Kemerovo, Russia	
4	Win	4–0	(Russia) Alisher Ashurov	TKO	1 (6) 2:35	7 Oct 2017	Prezidentskiy Sports Complex, Nizhny Tagil, Russia	
3	Win	3–0	(Russia) Maxim Sleptsov	TKO	2 (4) 2:14	8 Jun 2017	Prezidentskiy Sports Complex, Nizhny Tagil, Russia	
2	Win	2–0	(Russia) Alexander Obukhov	TKO	1 (4) 1:46	23 Feb 2017	Forum, Nizhny Tagil, Russia	
1	Win	1–0	(Russia) Sergey Dyachkov	RTD	3 (4) 3:00	29 Oct 2016	Central Stadium, Yekaterinburg, Russia	
