= Hugo Hernández =

Mexican boxer (born 1985)

Personal information
- Nickname: El Doradense
- Born: Hugo Hernández; 11 September 1985 (age 41) El Dorado, Sinaloa, Mexico
- Height: 5 ft 11 in (182 cm)
- Weight: Welterweight; Light Welterweight

Boxing career
- Reach: 73 in (184 cm)
- Stance: Orthodox

Boxing record
- Total fights: 30
- Wins: 16
- Win by KO: 14
- Losses: 12
- Draws: 2
- No contests: 0

Hugo Hernández (born 11 September 1985) is a Mexican professional boxer.

== Professional career ==
On 24 July 2010 Hernández will be fighting against undefeated Antonio Lozada jr. for the WBC FECARBOX Light Welterweight title.
