= Konstantin Ponomarev (boxer) =

Russian boxer (b. 1992)

Konstantin Ponomarev Константин Пономарев
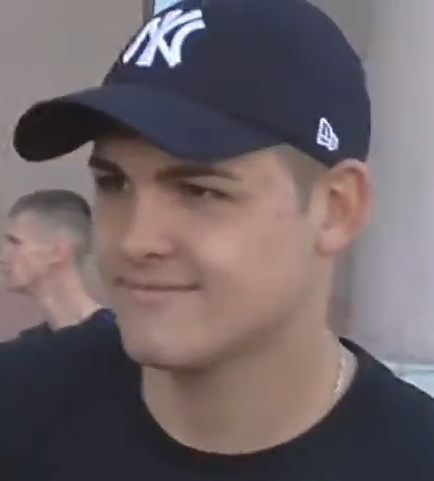
- Konstantin Ponomarev in July 2017

Personal information
- Nationality: Russian
- Born: Константин Петрович Пономарев; 17 October 1992 (age 33) Miass, Chelyabinsk Oblast, Russia
- Height: 1.78 m (5 ft 10 in)
- Weight: Welterweight

Boxing career
- Reach: 178 cm (70 in)
- Stance: Orthodox

Boxing record
- Total fights: 40
- Wins: 35
- Win by KO: 14
- Losses: 5

Konstantin Petrovich Ponomarev (Russian: Константин Петрович Пономарев; born 17 October 1992) is a Russian professional boxer in the welterweight division.

Ponomarev made his debut on at the age of 17, without much of an amateur background. He fought under promotional outfit Ural Boxing Promotions. At 18, he moved to Mexico and briefly trained with Ignacio Beristáin. In 2014, Ponomarev signed with Top Rank. Ponomarev started training with Gennady Golovkin's trainer, Abel Sanchez, shortly after. He defeated Cosme Rivera by unanimous decision (100-90, 100–90, 98–82) in his first fight under the American promotion. In May 2015, Ponomarev claimed the NABF title, beating Mikaël Zewski by unanimous decision (99-91, 98–92, 97–93).

In 2016, the IBF ordered an eliminator between Errol Spence and Ponomarev. Ponomarev and Top Rank ultimately decided to not partake in the eliminator and Spence ended up facing Leonard Bundu in an eliminator. In July 2017, the IBF ordered a title eliminator between Carlos Ocampo and Ponomarev. The winner will be the mandatory challenger to Spence, who had become the IBF's champion. The fight was later called off as Ponomarev pulled out for undisclosed reasons.

On the 21st of July 2018 Sergey Vorobiev ended Ponomarev's undefeated streak.

== Professional boxing record ==
40 fights	35 wins	5 losses
By knockout	14	2
By decision	20	3
By disqualification	1	0

No.	Result	Record	Opponent	Type	Round, Time	Date	Location	Notes
40	Loss	35–5	Avni Yıldırım	TKO	3 (8), 1:59	6 Jun 2026	The Gallery Meydan, Dubai, United Arab Emirates	
39	Loss	35–4	Vadim Tukov	RTD	6 (10), 3:00	23 Mar 2024	RCC Boxing Academy, Yekaterinburg, Russia	
38	Loss	35–3	Orkhan Gadzhiev	SD	10	16 Dec 2023	International Boxing Centre Luzhniki, Moscow, Russia	For vacant Russian super middleweight title
37	Win	35–2	Charlan Takam	TKO	2 (6), 0:42	24 Dec 2021	EcoTime, Miass, Russia	
36	Loss	34–2	Oleksandr Ivanov	UD	10	9 Feb 2019	Galaktika Culture Centre, Estosadok, Russia	
35	Loss	34–1	Sergey Vorobiev	SD	10	21 Jul 2018	Olimpiyskiy, Moscow, Russia	For vacant Russian super welterweight title
34	Win	34–0	Ambrosi Sutidze	UD	8	12 May 2018	Arena Riga, Riga, Latvia	
33	Win	33–0	Pavel Mamontov	UD	10	24 Mar 2018	Basket-Hall, Krasnodar, Russia	Won vacant Russian middleweight title
32	Win	32–0	Ed Paredes	UD	8	20 May 2017	Madison Square Garden, New York City, New York, U.S.	
31	Win	31–0	Silverio Ortiz	UD	8	26 Nov 2016	The Cosmopolitan of Las Vegas, Chelsea Ballroom, Paradise, Nevada, U.S.	
30	Win	30–0	Brad Solomon	SD	10	9 Apr 2016	MGM Grand Garden Arena, Paradise, Nevada, U.S.	Retained WBC–NABF welterweight title
29	Win	29–0	Ramses Agaton	MD	8	20 Nov 2015	The Cosmopolitan of Las Vegas, Chelsea Ballroom, Paradise, Nevada, U.S.	
28	Win	28–0	Mikaël Zewski	UD	10	1 May 2015	The Cosmopolitan of Las Vegas, Chelsea Ballroom, Paradise, Nevada, U.S.	Won WBC–NABF welterweight title
27	Win	27–0	Steve Claggett	UD	8	24 Jan 2015	1stBank Center, Broomfield, Colorado, U.S.	
26	Win	26–0	Bekhzod Nabiev	TKO	5 (8), 2:00	27 Nov 2014	Markstadt, Chelyabinsk, Russia	
25	Win	25–0	Cosme Rivera Yocupicio	UD	10	20 Sep 2014	Celebrity Theatre, Phoenix, Arizona, U.S.	
24	Win	24–0	Joseph De los Santos	TKO	1 (10), 2:49	28 Jun 2014	CenturyLink Center, Omaha, Nebraska, U.S.	
23	Win	23–0	Ramon De La Cruz Sena	UD	10	1 Feb 2014	Traktos Sports Palace, Chelyabinsk, Russia	
22	Win	22–0	Rogelio Castañeda Jr.	RTD	3 (8), 3:00	14 Nov 2013	Florentine Gardens, Hollywood, California, U.S.	
21	Win	21–0	Isaac Aryee	UD	10	26 Jun 2013	Yunost Arena, Chelyabinsk, Russia	Won vacant WBC Youth welterweight title
20	Win	20–0	Sergei Melis	UD	8	15 May 2013	Giant Hall, Casino Conti, Saint Petersburg, Russia	
19	Win	19–0	Fariz Kazimov	TKO	7 (8), 1:00	16 Mar 2013	Sports Palace "Znamya", Noginsk, Russia	
18	Win	18–0	Wily Medina	RTD	5 (8), 3:00	6 Dec 2012	Discoteca The City, Cancún, Mexico	
17	Win	17–0	Bogdan Protsyshyn	RTD	5 (8), 3:00	13 Oct 2012	Tskhinvali, Georgia	
16	Win	16–0	Bogdan Mitic	MD	10	24 Jul 2012	Budva, Montenegro	Retained WBC Youth Intercontinental welterweight title
15	Win	15–0	Marat Khuzeev	UD	8	31 May 2012	Ufa Arena, Ufa, Russia	
14	Win	14–0	Vadzim Astapuk	TKO	3 (6), 1:09	8 Apr 2012	Sports Palace "Znamya", Noginsk, Russia	
13	Win	13–0	Luis Alejandro Moreno	TKO	5 (10), 2:10	3 Mar 2012	Traktor Sports Palace, Chelyabinsk, Russia	Retained WBC Youth Intercontinental welterweight title
12	Win	12–0	Beka Sutidze	UD	8	26 Nov 2011	Traktor Sports Palace, Chelyabinsk, Russia	Retained WBC Youth Intercontinental welterweight title
11	Win	11–0	Sergey Sergeev	UD	6	25 Sep 2011	Olimp, Krasnodar, Russia	
10	Win	10–0	Fedor Mushtranov	UD	8	28 Apr 2011	Red Square, Moscow, Russia	Won vacant WBC Youth Intercontinental welterweight title
9	Win	9–0	Vyacheslav Yakovenko	UD	6	20 Apr 2011	Markstadt, Chelyabinsk, Russia	
8	Win	8–0	Anatoliy Sidorov	RTD	4 (6), 3:00	26 Mar 2011	Sports Palace "Znamya", Noginsk, Russia	
7	Win	7–0	Viktor Izhak	RTD	4 (6), 3:00	23 Feb 2011	Traktor Sports Palace, Chelyabinsk, Russia	
6	Win	6–0	Ivan Kaberkon	TKO	1 (8), 1:27	27 Jan 2011	Markstadt, Chelyabinsk, Russia	
5	Win	5–0	Dmitry Lavrinenko	TKO	4 (6), 2:28	10 Dec 2010	Circus, Tyumen, Russia	
4	Win	4–0	Alexey Gulov	TKO	3 (4)	24 Oct 2010	Manezh, Vladikavkaz, Russia	
3	Win	3–0	Eduard Aslanyan	UD	4	5 Aug 2010	Manezh, Vladikavkaz, Russia	
2	Win	2–0	Dzhamal Nadirbegov	DQ	4 (4)	8 Jul 2010	Ambar, Tolyatti, Russia	
1	Win	1–0	Bobir Normatov	UD	4	17 Apr 2010	Giant Hall, Casino Conti, Saint Petersburg, Russia	
