= Gary Allen Russell =

American boxer

Medal record

Men's Boxing

Representing United States

National Golden Gloves
Gold medal – first place	2010 National Golden Gloves	Light Welterweight

Gary Allen Russell III (born February 4, 1993, in Washington, D.C.) is an American amateur boxer and the brother of the WBC featherweight champion Gary Russell, Jr.

== Amateur career ==
Russell won the 2010 National Golden Gloves at Light Welterweight at the Statehouse Convention Center in Little Rock, Arkansas.

== See also ==
- Notable boxing families
