= Jeremy Bryan =

American boxer

Personal information
- Nickname: Hollywood
- Nationality: American
- Born: February 11, 1986 (age 40)
- Height: 5 ft 9 in (175 cm)
- Weight: Welterweight

Boxing career
- Reach: 72 in (183 cm)

Boxing record
- Total fights: 25
- Wins: 17
- Win by KO: 7
- Losses: 8

Jeremy Bryan (born February 11, 1986) is an American professional boxer. As an amateur, he was a two-time National Golden Gloves champion at light welterweight.

== Amateur career ==
Bryan was a standout amateur boxer, winning the 2004 and 2005 National Golden Gloves Light welterweight championship. He was the first Golden Gloves champion from the Optimist Boxing Club in Sumter, South Carolina. He also was the 2004 U-19 champion at 139 lbs and the 2005 National PAL 139 lb. champion.

=== Amateur Highlights ===
- Competed in the 2001 US National Junior Olympics at 125 lbs.
- Competed at the 2002 National Police Athletic League (PAL) championships at 125 lbs, losing to Jason Litzau.
- Competed at the 2003 United States Under-19 championships at 60 kg.
- Quarter-finalist at the 2004 United States championships at 141 lbs, losing to Charles Hatley.
- Semi-finalist at the 2004 US Eastern Olympic Trials at 141 lbs.
- Gold medalist at the 2004 National Golden Gloves championships at 141 lbs beating Keith Mason.
- Gold medalist at the 2004 US Under-19 championships at 141 lbs.
- Competed in the 2005 US championships at 64 kg, losing to Hector Ramos.
- Won the gold medal at the 2005 NGG championships at 64 kg.
- Quarter-finalist at the 2006 NGG championships at 64 kg, losing to Mike Dallas.
- Quarter-finalist at the 2006 US championships at 64 kg.
- Competed at the 2006 PAL championships at 64 kg losing to Mike Dallas.
- Won the 2007/8 US Mid West Olympic Trials at 64 kg beating John Molina and Ed Brooks.
- Competed at the 2008 US Olympic Trials at 64 kg beating Danny Garcia, losing to John Molina, beating Andre Sherard and then losing to Garcia.

== Professional career ==
Bryan turned pro in 2007 and is currently 17–8.
