= Henry Aurad =

Colombian boxer (born 1984)

Henry Yair Auraad Rodríguez
Personal information
- Nickname: El Mamba
- Nationality: Colombian
- Born: Cartagena, Colombia
- Height: 6 ft 0 in (183 cm)
- Weight: Welterweight

Boxing career
- Reach: 72 in (183 cm)
- Stance: Orthodox

Boxing record
- Total fights: 33
- Wins: 22
- Win by KO: 17
- Losses: 10
- Draws: 1
- No contests: 0

Henry Yair Auraad Rodríguez is a Colombian professional boxer.

== Professional career ==
On 10 April 2010 Auraad lost to undefeated Antonio Lozada, Jr. by T.K.O. at 2:10 of the second round. This bout was for the WBC FECARBOX light welterweight title and was televised on Televisa.

== Personal life ==
Aurad also works as an actor, appearing in television series such as Sin senos sí hay paraíso and Tres Golpes. He received his degree from Politécnico Grancolombiano.
