= Daniel Valenzuela (boxer) =

Mexican boxer (born 1982)

Personal information
- Nickname: El Mulato
- Born: Daniel Valenzuela Valenzuela; 13 January 1990 (age 36) Hermosillo, Sonora, Mexico
- Weight: Lightweight

Boxing career
- Stance: Orthodox

Boxing record
- Total fights: 85
- Wins: 36
- Win by KO: 21
- Losses: 47
- Draws: 2
- No contests: 0

Daniel Valenzuela (born 30 November 1982) is a Mexican professional boxer.

== Professional career ==
In May 2010 Valenzuela fought Miguel Roman for the vacant WBC FECOMBOX Super Featherweight title, the fight was on Mexico Cadena 3.

On 12 September 2009 he lost to Brandon Rios in El Palenque de la Feria, Tepic, Nayarit, Mexico.
