= Danny O'Connor (boxer) =

American boxer

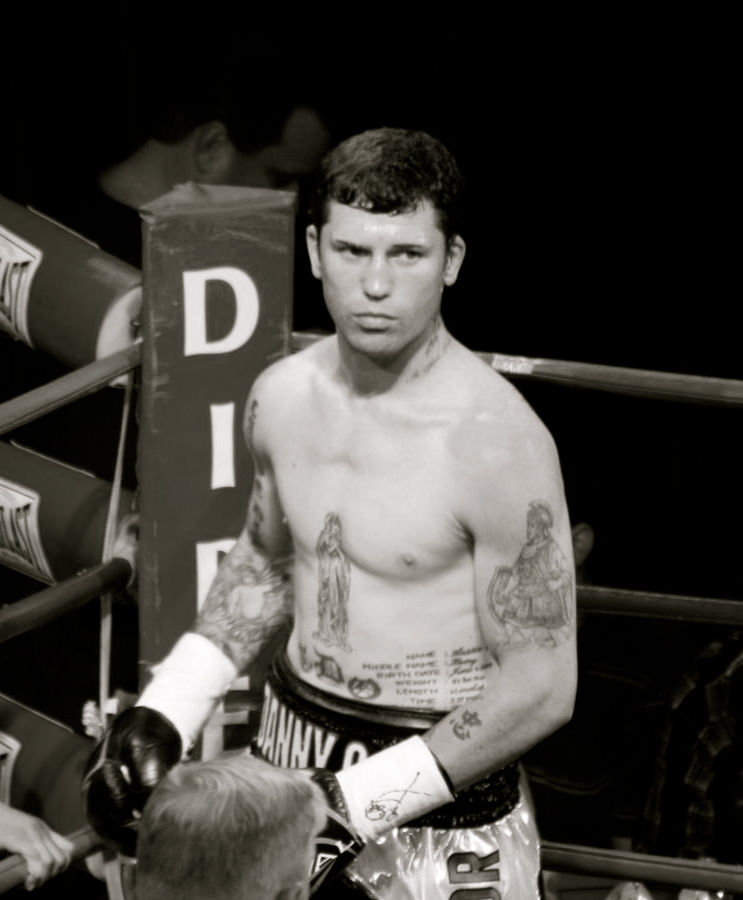

Personal information
- Nicknames: Danny O, Danny Bhoy
- Nationality: American
- Born: Daniel Thomas O'Connor; March 30, 1986 (age 40) Framingham, Massachusetts
- Height: 5 ft 9 in (175 cm)
- Weight: Light welterweight

Boxing career
- Reach: 70 in (178 cm)
- Stance: Southpaw

Boxing record
- Total fights: 33
- Wins: 30
- Win by KO: 11
- Losses: 3
- Draws: 0
- No contests: 0

Daniel Thomas O'Connor (born March 30, 1986) is an American professional boxer. As of July 7, 2010, O'Connor fought for the boxing promotion Murphy's Boxing, which was founded by Ken Casey of the Boston punk band, Dropkick Murphys.

== Early life ==
An Irish American, O'Connor started playing soccer at the age of five and continued throughout high school. An avid soccer fan, he is a supporter of Celtic F.C., Liverpool F.C., his hometown team the New England Revolution and is a member of American Outlaws US Soccer Supporters. Along with a passion for soccer, Danny developed a love of boxing while growing up by spending every Friday evening in front of the TV set with his grandfather watching Friday Night Fights. As a child growing up without cable television, O'Connor's mother taught him how to sew. This skill he honed and later used in his early boxing career."

== Amateur career ==
O'Connor was the 2007 US Olympic Trials bronze medalist and the 2008 U.S. Olympic Team alternate. He ended his amateur career with a record of 110 wins and 11 losses. O'Connor, a four-time New England Golden Gloves champion, won the 2008 national Golden Gloves at light welterweight. O'Connor also won the US Nationals in 2008 and was voted outstanding boxer of the tournament. Winning these two national tournaments in the same year back to back put O'Connor in an elite list of boxers who have accomplished this which includes Sugar Ray Leonard and Thomas Hearns. Danny's most notable victory as an amateur was a dominant 23-3 win against eventual 2008 Olympic Gold medalist Manuel Félix Díaz. O'Connor was featured in the May 5, 2008, issue of Sports Illustrated Faces in the Crowd.

== Professional career ==
Upon returning from the Beijing Olympics, O'Connor turned professional on September 17, 2008. Danny signed under Warriors Boxing and Dibella entertainment. O'Connor was managed by Ken Casey of the Dropkick Murphys. O'Connor and Casey met through Casey's charity, The Claddagh fund.

O'Connors' training camp was based in Houston. His former boxing coach is Hall of Fame trainer Ronnie Shields. O'Connor trained at a facility called "Plex" a conditioning gym run by Danny Arnold.

== Professional boxing record ==
30 Wins (11 KOs), 3 Losses
Res.	Record	Opponent	Type	Round	Date	Location	Notes
Win	30-3	(Canada) Steve Claggett	UD	10	2018-03-17	(United States) House of Blues, Boston	Retained WBC International Silver super lightweight title
Win	29-3	(United States) Daniel Gonzalez	TKO	3 (10)	2017-11-25	(United States) Mohegan Sun Casino, Uncasville	Won vacant WBC International Silver super lightweight title
Win	28-3	(Republic of Ireland) Michael McLaughlin	UD	8	2017-3-18	(United States) House of Blues, Boston, Massachusetts	
Win	27-3	(United States) Jerry Thomas	SD	8	2015-8-13	(United States) Kansas Expocentre, Topeka, Kanas	
Loss	26-3	(Puerto Rico) Gabriel Bracero	KO	1	2015-10-10	(United States) Lowell Memorial Auditorium, Lowell, Massachusetts	
Win	26-2	(United States) Chris Gilbert	TKO	5	2015-5-23	(United States) Agganis Arena, Boston, Massachusetts	
Win	25-2	(United States) Michael Clark	KO	1	2015-4-10	(United States) Memorial Hall, Melrose, Massachusetts	
Win	24-2	(United States) Andrew Farmer	KO	4	2014-10-30	(United States) Memorial Hall, Plymouth, Massachusetts	
Loss	23-2	(Guyana) Vivian Harris	SD	10	2013-10-12	(United States) The Electric Factory, Philadelphia, Pennsylvania	
Win	23-1	(United States) Raul Tovar	UD	8	2013-09-12	(United States) Verizon Wireless Arena, Manchester, New Hampshire	
Win	22-1	(United States) Ruben Galvan	DQ	4	2013-08-24	(United States) SportsZone, Derry, New Hampshire	
Win	21-1	(United States) Hector Munoz	UD	8	2013-06-29	(United States) MGM Grand at Foxwoods Resort, Mashantucket, Connecticut	
Win	20-1	(United States) Derek Silveria	MD	10	2013-01-26	(United States) TD Garden, Boston, Massachusetts	
Win	19-1	(United States) Josh Sosa	TKO	3	2012-09-29	(United States) MGM Grand at Foxwoods Resort, Mashantucket, Connecticut	
Win	18-1	(Puerto Rico) Eddie Soto	KO	4	2012-08-12	(United States) Gillette Stadium, Foxborough, Massachusetts	
Win	17-1	(Puerto Rico) Daniel Sostre	RTD	4	2012-05-24	(United States) House of Blues, Boston, Massachusetts	
Win	16-1	(United States) Bryan Abraham	UD	6	2011-10-21	(United States) Foxwoods Resort, Mashantucket, Connecticut	
Win	15-1	(Mexico) Jaime Del Cid	TKO	1	2011-09-21	(United States) Verizon Wireless Arena, Manchester, New Hampshire	
Loss	14-1	(Puerto Rico) Gabriel Bracero	UD	8	2011-04-08	(United States) Event center, Laredo, Texas	O'Connor spitting up blood in the dressing room before the fight
Win	14-0	(Mexico) Humberto Tapia	UD	8	2010-11-20	(United States) Mohegan Sun Casino, Uncansville, Connecticut	
Win	13-0	(Puerto Rico) Jose Angel Roman	UD	6	2010-09-15	(United States) Verizon Wireless Arena, Manchester, New Hampshire	
Win	12-0	(United States) Broderick Antoine	UD	6	2010-05-22	(United States) Mohegan Sun Casino, Uncansville, Connecticut	
Win	11-0	(Dominican Republic) Franklin Gonzales	UD	8	2010-03-19	(United States) Twin River Event Center, Lincoln, Rhode Island	
Win	10-0	(United States) James Hope	UD	6	2009-11-20	(United States) Twin River Event Center, Lincoln, Rhode Island	
Win	9-0	(United States) Patrick Cape	TKO	3	2009-09-23	(United States) Verizon Wireless Arena, Manchester, New Hampshire	
Win	8-0	(United States) James Helmes	UD	6	2009-07-31	(United States) Seminole Hard Rock Hotel and Casino, Hollywood, Florida	
Win	7-0	(Canada) Sebastian Hamel	UD	6	2009-06-27	(United States) The Roxy, Boston, Massachusetts	
Win	6-0	(United States) Travis Hartman	UD	4	2009-04-25	(United States) Foxwoods Resort, Mashantucket, Connecticut	
Win	5-0	(United States) Charles Wade	TKO	1	2009-03-14	(United States) Dorchester Armory, Dorchester, Massachusetts	
Win	4-0	(United States) Jamar Saunders	MD	4	2009-02-27	(United States) Seminole Hard Rock Hotel and Casino, Hollywood, Florida	
Win	3-0	(Canada) Gregorio Jimenez	UD	4	2009-01-30	Bell centre, Montreal, Quebec, Canada	
Win	2-0	(The Bahamas) Anthony Woods	UD	4	2008-11-11	(United States) Seminole Hard Rock Hotel and Casino, Hollywood, Florida	
Win	1-0	(United States) Jose Guerrido	TKO	2	2008-09-17	(United States) Verizon Wireless Arena, New Hampshire	Professional debut.
