= HBO World Championship Boxing =

American TV sports series (1973–2018)

- WCB title card, from 2013 to 2018
- Genre: Boxing telecasts
- Presented by: Bob Costas; James Brown
- Starring: Various
- Narrated by: Jim Lampley; Max Kellerman; Roy Jones Jr.
- Theme music composer: Ferdinand Jay Smith III; Casey Filiaci
- Country of origin: United States
- Original languages: English; Spanish
- No. of seasons: 45

Production
- Production location: Various boxing stadiums
- Camera setup: Multi-camera
- Running time: Various
- Production company: HBO Sports

Original release
- Network: HBO; HBO Latino truTV
- Release: January 22, 1973 – December 8, 2018

Related
- Boxing After Dark; MetroPCS Friday Night Knockout

HBO World Championship Boxing (in later years stylized in its title card as HBO Boxing – World Championship) is an American sports television series on premium television network HBO. It premiered on January 22, 1973, with a fight that saw George Foreman defeat Joe Frazier in Kingston, Jamaica.

HBO's pay-per-view distribution arm, TVKO was founded in December 1990, and then launched in April 1991 with Evander Holyfield vs. George Foreman, becoming HBO PPV in 2001.

On February 3, 1996, HBO debuted a spin-off program, Boxing After Dark, with the fight between Marco Antonio Barrera and Kennedy McKinney as its inaugural telecast.

On September 27, 2018, HBO announced they would be dropping boxing from the network following its last televised match on October 27, though two airings on November 24 and December 8 were its last editions. Various issues in the boxing business, including the influx of streaming options (such as DAZN and ESPN+) and issues with promoters and competing entities such as Premier Boxing Champions, along with declining ratings and loss of interest in the sport among HBO's subscribers for other ring sports such as mixed martial arts and professional wrestling, made the continued carriage of the sport untenable. HBO's long-term move to upscale dramatic programming, an ownership transfer of parent WarnerMedia to AT&T, then Warner Bros. Discovery, where the company's sport division became focused on TNT as TNT Sports, and re-focus around the upcoming streaming service HBO Max also played a role in the decision, with an HBO executive commenting that "HBO is not a sports network". The network cancelled its last sports-related program, Real Sports with Bryant Gumbel, at the end of 2023.

In March 2024, Warner Bros. Discovery revived the HBO Boxing brand as a free ad-supported streaming television (FAST) channel that are available on Tubi and Amazon Freevee, that showcases some boxing bouts that aired on World Championship Boxing and Boxing After Dark, as well as some boxing-related episodes of 24/7.

== Memorable events ==
Famous matches broadcast on World Championship Boxing include:

- the Rumble in the Jungle, in which Muhammad Ali regained the world heavyweight title from George Foreman in Kinshasa, Zaire in 1974;
- the Thrilla in Manila, the final encounter between Muhammad Ali and Joe Frazier and HBO's first program when the service uplinked to satellite in 1975;
- Sugar Ray Leonard vs. Thomas Hearns I and II
- When Wilfred Benítez beat Roberto Durán
- Larry Holmes vs. Gerry Cooney, for the World Boxing Council (WBC) heavyweight championship;
- the Battle of the Champions, when Aaron Pryor beat Alexis Argüello in their first fight;
- Carnival of Champions, in which Wilfredo Gómez beat Lupe Pintor, and Thomas Hearns beat Wilfred Benítez;
- Marvin Hagler defeats Roberto Durán and Hector Camacho beat Rafi Solis - both fights shown on the same night, days after they had taken place
- Marvin Hagler-Thomas Hearns fight, billed as The War;
- Evander Holyfield vs. George Foreman, billed as The Battle of the Ages;
- Thunder Meets Lightning, in which Julio César Chávez beat Meldrick Taylor with two seconds remaining in the twelfth round;
- Michael Moorer vs. George Foreman, in which Foreman knocked out Michael Moorer to become the oldest heavyweight champion of the world at age 45;
- James "Buster" Douglas's stunning upset of Mike Tyson for the undisputed world heavyweight title in Tokyo, Japan;
- Evander Holyfield vs. Lennox Lewis and Evander Holyfield vs. Lennox Lewis II;
- Arturo Gatti vs. Micky Ward trilogy, in which the first fight, Ward beat Gatti by majority decision, while Gatti beat Ward twice, in second and third fights by unanimous decision;
- Manny Pacquiao vs. Juan Manuel Márquez tetralogy, in which the first fight ended in a split draw where Burt Clements incorrectly scored 113-113, despite three knockdowns scored by Pacquiao, the second fight ended in Pacquiao winning by split-decision with the knockdown scored in round three as the difference in the fight, the third fight, in which Pacquiao won by majority decision and the final fight of the rivalry resulting Márquez knocking out Pacquiao in the sixth round with one second left;
- The Fight of the Millennium, when Felix Trinidad beat Oscar De La Hoya by twelve rounds majority decision.
- Bernard Hopkins vs. Oscar De La Hoya;
- The World Awaits - Floyd Mayweather Jr. beat Oscar De La Hoya for the WBC super-welterweight title;
- Undefeated" - Floyd Mayweather Jr. beat Ricky Hatton to retain the WBC welterweight title with a TKO in the 10th round;
- The Dream Match - The Welterweight match between Manny Pacquiao (moving up 2 weight classes) against Oscar De La Hoya (moving down 1 weight class). Pacquiao won by technical knockout before the 9th round began (De La Hoya retired on his stool);
- Mayweather Jr. vs. Pacquiao, when Mayweather outpointed Pacquiao over 12 rounds in one of the most widely seen fights around the world in boxing history (on May 2, 2015, simulcasted with Showtime);
- Saúl "Canelo" Álvarez's outpointing of Miguel Cotto by 12 round unanimous decision on a November 21, 2015.
- Saul "Canelo" Alvarez vs Gennady Golovkin I &II. Canelo took on GGG in 2017 and 2018. Both fights were very close and are still disputed today, with the first fight ending in a draw and the second ending in a win, via majority decision, for Canelo.
- Riddick Bowe vs. Andrew Golota. A confrontation between Golota and Bowe's entourage after Golata's disqualification for delivering low blows to Bowe, resulting a chaotic and violent brawl between the boxers' respective entourages and fans. During the fight, HBO's commentary team had to evacuate their ringside position (with George Foreman helping to protect his fellow commentators after unsuccessfully attempting to put an end to the fighting; the commentators' table was destroyed in the brawl), resulting in several minutes of commentary-free coverage of the melee before Jim Lampley was able to resume coverage of the incident from several levels above. Larry Merchant and Foreman remained in the ring providing coverage as tempers continued to flare into punch-ups between spectators. The credits rolled over footage of NYPD officers entering MSG and beginning to make arrests.

World Championship Boxing has also had three spin-off series: Boxing After Dark; KO Nation; and MetroPCS Friday Night Knockout, a weekly broadcast co-produced with Turner Sports for sister cable network TruTV. multiplex Spanish-language channel HBO Latino aired two spin-off series Oscar De La Hoya Presenta Boxeo De Oro (focused on fighters from De La Hoya's Golden Boy Promotions) and Generación Boxeo.

Additionally, a video game carrying the brand name HBO Boxing was released for the PlayStation in 2000, which was published by Acclaim Entertainment under their Acclaim Sports banner.

== Commentators ==
The main broadcast team was Jim Lampley on blow-by-blow, with former and future ESPN reporter Max Kellerman as color commentator, replacing Larry Merchant, who retired in December 2012. For the last two years of Merchant's contract he and Kellerman alternated telecasts.

The analyst position was held) by former multiple-division world champion Roy Jones, Jr. Andre Ward or Bernard Hopkins filled in when Jones was unavailable. The position used to be held by Sugar Ray Leonard and former world heavyweight champions George Foreman and Lennox Lewis, and most recently (until his death) by trainer Emanuel Steward.

For pay-per-view fights, Bob Costas and James Brown used to host the telecast while Lampley called the fight; however Lampley later did both.

Harold Lederman, a former boxing judge, served as "unofficial scorer," giving his scorecards after every three rounds, sometimes two. Lederman also used to voice-over the rules under which the fight would be conducted before handing back to Lampley for pre-fight introductions; however the rules were later simply flashed on-screen to save time. Former judge Steve Weisfeld also appeared in this role, usually when Lederman's daughter Julie was judging a fight and as such Harold could not be on television due to the conflict of interest.

Michael Buffer was an unofficial member of the team as ring announcer for most HBO fights. Even Showtime Championship Boxing ring announcer Jimmy Lennon Jr. subbed for Buffer occasionally and Buffer occasionally subbed for Lennon on Showtime boxing programming.

Chon Romero was one of the commentators for HBO Boxing's Spanish telecasts.

Former commentators include: Marv Albert, Len Berman, Barry Tompkins, Fran Charles, Gil Clancy, Howard Cosell, Don Dunphy, Sugar Ray Leonard, Al Michaels, Jerry Quarry and Dick Stockton.

== International broadcasts ==
Prior to 2009, TSN, a basic-cable sports channel in Canada, held the Canadian broadcast rights to most HBO boxing events, often airing them live (with ads inserted between rounds) if they did not conflict with other sports properties on the channel. From January 2009 to the series' end, HBO World Championship Boxing, and other HBO boxing events, aired live on HBO Canada with later repeats on TSN.

== See also ==
- Boxing After Dark— a television boxing program airing on HBO from 1996 to 2018
- KO Nation— a short-lived television boxing program that aired on HBO from 2000 to 2001
- Showtime Championship Boxing— a television boxing program airing on Showtime from 1986 to 2023
- ShoBox: The New Generation— a television boxing program airing on Showtime from 2001 to 2023
- Top Rank Boxing on ESPN— a television boxing program airing on ESPN
- Premier Boxing Champions— a boxing promotion organized by Al Haymon and a television boxing program airing on multiple broadcast and cable networks from 2015 to the present
