= Timothy Bradley vs. Juan Manuel Márquez =

Boxing competition

- Date: October 12, 2013
- Venue: Thomas & Mack Center, Paradise, Nevada, U.S.
- Title(s) on the line: WBO welterweight title

Tale of the tape
Boxer	(United States) Timothy Bradley	(Mexico) Juan Manuel Márquez
Nickname	Desert Storm	Dinamita ("Dynamite")
Hometown	Palm Springs, California, U.S.	Iztacalco, Mexico City, Mexico
Pre-fight record	30–0 (1) (12 KO)	55–6–2 (40 KO)
Age	30 years, 1 month	40 years, 1 month
Height	5 ft 6 in (168 cm)	5 ft 7 in (170 cm)
Weight	146 lb (66 kg)	144 1/2 lb (66 kg)
Style	Orthodox	Orthodox
Recognition	WBO; Welterweight Champion; The Ring; No. 4 Ranked Welterweight; The Ring No. 8 ranked pound-for-pound fighter 2-division world champion	WBO; Light Welterweight champion The Ring No. 3 ranked pound-for-pound fighter 4-division world champion

Result
- Bradley wins via 12-round split decision (113-115, 115-113, 116-112)

Timothy Bradley vs. Juan Manuel Márquez, was a professional boxing match contested on October 12, 2013, for the WBO welterweight championship. The bout held at the Thomas & Mack Center in Las Vegas, Nevada, United States on HBO Pay-Per-View.

Two-time Olympic gold medalist and future three-weight world champion Vasiliy Lomachenko made his professional debut on the undercard of the fight, winning via a fourth-round knockout over Jose Luis Ramirez.

== Background ==
In June 9, 2012, Timothy Bradley shocked the world with a controversial split decision victory over then-WBO welterweight champion Manny Pacquiao to take the title, in which he would go on to defend in his next and latest fight against Ruslan Provodnikov the following year. Bradley suffered immense damage and a concussion from Provodnikov's punches in the fight and would go down in the twelfth and final round, but was able to beat his challenger in most of the 12 rounds to win a close unanimous decision in what was a candidate for Ring Magazine's Fight of the Year.

6 months after Bradley won against Pacquiao, Juan Manuel Marquez then stepped in against his rival on the night of December 8th. Marquez knocked Pacquiao down in the third round, but was knocked down in the fifth after touching the canvas. With 2:59 in the sixth round, Marquez landed a counter right hand on an aggressively charging Pacquiao to finally knock him out and complete the tetralogy in brutal fashion.

On June, promoter Bob Arum revealed that the fight would take place on October 12th in Thomas & Mack Center in Las Vegas, with two-country media tours taking place on Beverly Hills, California and Mexico City following the announcement.

At the weigh-in on Friday, Bradley weighed in at 146 lbs, and Marquez weighed in at a career-high 144 1/2 lbs.

== The fights ==
=== Lomachenko vs. Ramírez ===
Two-time Olympic Gold Medalist Vasiliy Lomachenko made his professional debut on the undercard, taking on Jose Luis Ramírez.

==== Fight Details ====
Lomachenko started the fight strong, knocking down Ramirez in the second minute with a left hand body shot. He would dominate the second and third rounds with clean shots to his opponent, and avoiding most of the offense from Ramirez.

With less than 15 seconds in the fourth, Lomachenko lands another left hand to the body to knock Ramirez down for the second time, which ultimately finished him to give Lomachenko his first professional career win.

Debut	Vasiliy Lomachenko's bouts 12 October 2013	Succeeded by vs. Orlando Salido
Preceded by vs. Rey Bautista	José Luis Ramírez's bouts 12 October 2013	Succeeded by vs. Abner Mares

=== Salido vs. Cruz ===
The first world title bout on the card saw Orlando Salido face Orlando Cruz for the vacant WBO Featherweight title. The previous champion Mikey Garcia had been stripped of the title for failing to make weight in a planned title defence against Juan Manuel López in June. Cruz was attempting to become the first openly Gay male boxing champion in history.

==== Fight Details ====
Salido stopped Cruz in the seventh round to regain the title.

Preceded by vs. Mikey Garcia	Orlando Salido's bouts 12 October 2013	Succeeded by vs. Vasiliy Lomachenko
Preceded by vs. Aalan Martinez	Orlando Cruz's bouts 12 October 2013	Succeeded by vs. Gamalier Rodríguez

=== Main Event ===
The fight was fought at Bradley's pace, where Marquez was unable to connect his left hooks and right hands and he was able to land his left jab more often than in his previous fights. Both fighters taunted at each other with less than 10 seconds remaining in the fifth, with Marquez being more committed to the taunt and was hit by Bradley as he came charging forward.

The challenger soon got more frustrated with Bradley in the middle portion of the fight, as the champion kept Marquez at bay with his jab and evading most of Marquez's counters with his footwork and head movement.

In the 10th, Marquez connected with his right hand on Bradley, but the latter came back and landed a hard right overhand on Marquez's jaw, which momentarily staggered him as a result.

With 15 seconds remaining in the fight, Marquez cornered Bradley on the ropes and fired a fierce combination whilst Bradley was throwing back more punches that were ineffective, but timed Marquez with a counter left hook that almost dropped the challenger as he was buckling backwards, which ultimately sealed the round for him.

After 12 rounds, Bradley won via a split decision, as the judges scored the fight 113–115, 115–113, and 116–112.

== Aftermath ==
After the fight, Marquez immediately went back to his dressing room with his trainer, Ignacio Beristáin, during Bradley's post-fight interview. He commented on the fight during the interview, and said "I gave him a boxing lesson. He couldn't touch me. I had complete control."

Both Marquez and his trainer were later interviewed and was asked about his thoughts of the fight. Just like the case with his post-fight interview in the third fight against Pacquiao two years ago, he once again slammed the judges' decision on giving Bradley the victory, stating that "I clearly won. I have been robbed six times in my career. You don't have to knock down the other guy to win the fight." Beristáin also pointed out that Bradley has suffered two losses against his fighter, as well as Pacquiao last year.

The fight drew 375,000 pay-per-view buys, as well as 13,111 in attendance and generated a live gate of $2,998,950.

On January, it was announced that the rematch between Bradley and Pacquiao will take place at the MGM Grand Garden Arena on April 13, 2014. Pacquiao eventually beats Bradley via unanimous decision to reclaim his title.

After several months of inactivity, Marquez would return to fight against Mike Alvarado on May 17 for the vacant WBO International Welterweight title. Marquez won a wide unanimous decision in what would eventually turn out to be his last fight of his career, as he would be inactive for the next 3 years before retiring in August 2017.

== Fight Card ==
Confirmed bouts:

Weight Class	Result				Round	Time	Notes
Welterweight	(United States) Timothy Bradley	def.	(Mexico) Juan Manuel Márquez	SD	12		^{note 1}
Featherweight	(Mexico) Orlando Salido	def.	(Puerto Rico) Orlando Cruz	KO	7 (12)	1:05	^{note 2}
Featherweight	(Ukraine) Vasiliy Lomachenko	def.	(Mexico) José Luis Ramírez	KO	4 (10)	2:59	^{note 3}
Light Heavyweight	(United States) Sean Monaghan	def.	(United States) Anthony Smith	TKO	3 (10)	2:39
Preliminary Card
Welterweight	(United States) Brad Solomon	def.	(United States) Kenny Abril	UD	8
Welterweight	(Canada) Mikael Zewski	def.	(United States) Alberto Herrera	RTD	5 (8)	3:00
Featherweight	(Philippines) Rogelio Jun Doliguez	def.	(Mexico) Giovanni Caro	TKO	6 (8)	2:53
Light Heavyweight	(United States) Trevor McCumby	def.	(United States) Eric Watkins	UD	6

^Note 1 For WBO welterweight title.
^Note 2 For vacant WBO Featherweight title.
^Note 3 For WBO International featherweight title.

== Broadcasting ==
Country	Broadcaster
Brazil	SporTV
Canada	Viewers Choice
Philippines	Solar All Access; Solar Sports; GMA Network; GMA News TV^{1}
Thailand	Channel 7
United States	HBO PPV
United Kingdom	Sky Sports 1 HD

^{1}The GMA News TV version ceased airing due to high airtime cost with live coverage via satellite feed of Timothy Bradley vs. Juan Manuel Marquez boxing fight.

Preceded by vs. Ruslan Provodnikov	Timothy Bradley's bouts 12 October 2013	Succeeded by vs. Manny Pacquiao II
Preceded by vs. Manny Pacquiao IV	Juan Manuel Márquez's bouts 12 October 2013	Succeeded by vs. Mike Alvarado
