= Orlando Salido vs. Vasiliy Lomachenko =

Boxing match

- Date: March 1, 2014
- Venue: Alamodome, San Antonio, Texas, U.S.
- Title(s) on the line: vacant WBO featherweight title

Tale of the tape
Boxer	Orlando Salido	Vasiliy Lomachenko
Nickname	"Siri"	"Hi-Tech"
Hometown	Ciudad Obregón, Sonora, Mexico	Bilhorod-Dnistrovskyi, Odesa Oblast, Ukraine
Pre-fight record	41–12–2 (1) (28 KO)	1–0 (1 KO)
Age	33 years, 3 months	26 years
Height	5 ft 6 in (168 cm)	5 ft 7 in (170 cm)
Weight	128 1/4 lb (58 kg)	125 1/4 lb (57 kg)
Style	Orthodox	Southpaw
Recognition	The Ring; No. 2 Ranked Featherweight; TBRB; No. 6 Ranked Featherweight; Former WBO featherweight champion	WBO; No. 5 Ranked Featherweight; 2-time Olympic gold medalist

Result
- Salido wins via 12-round split decision (115-113, 113-115, 116-112)

Orlando Salido vs. Vasiliy Lomachenko, was a professional boxing match contested on March 1, 2014, for the vacant WBO featherweight championship. The bout was in San Antonio, Texas, United States. The fight was televised live on HBO World Championship Boxing as the chief support to Julio César Chávez Jr.'s rematch with Brian Vera. Salido won by a controversial split decision.

Had Lomachenko won the bout, he would have broken the record set by Thailand's Saensak Muangsurin, who won a junior welterweight world title in his third pro fight in 1975.

== Background ==
Lomachenko is a Ukrainian professional boxer who became two-time Olympic gold medalist and a winner of gold medals at the 2009 World Amateur Boxing Championships and 2011 World Amateur Boxing Championships. At the 2008 Beijing Olympic Games he was awarded the Val Barker Trophy. Lomachenko is being regarded as one of the best amateur fighters of all time. Lomachenko wanted to fight for a world title in his pro debut, but that was not possible.

== Salido's weight issues and controversy ==
Salido, 33, of Mexico, failed to make weight and was stripped of his belt at the weigh-in. He was 128¼ pounds, well over the 126-pound limit. And he weighed 11 pounds more than Lomachenko at the start of the contest.

Boxing Insider, "Salido showed up heavy for the fight. Really heavy. One hundred forty-seven pounds heavy."

Bad Left Hook: "A few things worked against him [Lomachenko]. Orlando Salido not making the fight's weight limit of 126 pounds and then rehydrating up to 147, compared to Lomachenko's 136."

== The fights ==
=== Salido vs. Lomachenko ===
Lomachenko lost a controversial split decision to a fighter that failed to make weight who weighed, post weigh-in, 147 lbs., 21 pounds over the fight limit.

Two judges had it for Salido, 116–112 and 115–113, while the third had it for Lomachenko 115–113. HBO's unofficial ringside scorer Harold Lederman as well as ESPN.com scored the fight a draw 114–114.

=== Main Event ===
Julio César Chávez Jr. vs. Brian Vera II
- Title(s) on the line: vacant WBC Continental Americas super middleweight title

Tale of the tape
Boxer	Julio César Chávez Jr.	Brian Vera
Nickname	"La Leyenda Continua"	
Hometown	Culiacán, Sinaloa, Mexico	Fort Worth, Texas, U.S.
Pre-fight record	47–1–1 (1) (32 KO)	23–7 (14 KO)
Age	28 years	32 years, 2 months
Height	6 ft 0 in (183 cm)	6 ft 0 in (183 cm)
Weight	167 1/2 lb (76 kg)	167 1/2 lb (76 kg)
Style	Orthodox	Orthodox
Recognition	WBC; No. 1 Ranked Super Middleweight; WBO; No. 3 Ranked Super Middleweight; Former middleweight champion	WBC; No. 6 Ranked Middleweight; IBF; No. 14 Ranked Middleweight; WBO; No. 15 Ranked Middleweight

Result
- Chávez Jr defeats Vera by unanimous decision

The main event of the night saw Julio César Chávez Jr. have an immediate rematch with Brian Vera following his controversial unanimous decision victory in September 2013.

Vera was a 19/4 betting underdog.

==== The fight ====
In contrast to their first fight, Chávez came out more aggressive and made of his size and strength advantage. He kept the distance with the jab and landed power punches. In the 11th round he landed a powerful right hand that nearly knocked Vera out.

Chávez won via unanimous decision with scores of 114–113, 117–110 and 117–110.

==== Aftermath ====
After the fight, Chavez told HBO's Max Kellerman that he next wanted to face WBA middleweight champion Gennady Golovkin.

Preceded by First bout	Julio César Chávez Jr.'s bouts 1 March 2014	Succeeded by vs. Andrzej Fonfara
Preceded by First bout	Brian Vera's bouts 1 March 2014	Succeeded by vs. Willie Monroe Jr.

== Aftermath ==
Lomachenko, for his part, stated he felt the decision was "fair" and accepted blame for not following through with his corner's game plan, promising to learn from the experience and come back stronger.

=== Criticisms of referee and Orlando Salido ===
In addition to criticism of low blows by Salido, the referee of the fight, Laurence Cole, was roundly criticized by many boxing media-outlets for his perceived failure to properly conduct the match:

- ESPN wrote, "Cole warned him only once and did not seem too concerned" regarding low blows.
- In an interview with The Ring Magazine, Laurence admitted that his performance in the fight "might not have been his 'A-game." and they noted "Cole came under fire for appearing to allow Salido to land an inordinate amount of low blows."
- Boxing Insider wrote, "Of course Salido didn't exactly win the fight fair and square. The guy was about as dirty as they come on Saturday. He hit low and hit low consistently. Referee Laurence Cole didn't seem to notice, or to much care, so Salido whacked Lomachenko below the beltline throughout the entire bout..."
- Boxing.com wrote, "Few referees have turned in a performance as bad as that which Laurence Cole blessed us with Saturday night in, inevitably, San Antonio, Texas" and "astonishingly bad performance" in its article. They have claimed that the referee Laurence Cole failed to enforce rules on clinching, pushing and blows below the belt. The site has also mentioned: "not only should this ridiculous excuse for a referee be sacked forthwith but the role of his father plays in allegedly consistently obtaining for him some of the biggest fights in Texas in his role with the Texan commission needs to be investigated."
- Yahoo! Sports wrote that the fight was "poorly officiated by referee Laurence Cole, who missed numerous fouls and seemed to let anything go."
- Bad Left Hook wrote, "Maligned Texas referee Laurence Cole's performance was roundly and rightly criticized for missing a metric ton of Salido's low blows, which landed on the thighs and hips mainly. And that mattered."
- The Sweet Science wrote, "Holding and hitting, hitting on the break, low blows galore... Salido was aided by ref Laurence Cole who left his glasses at home."

This was the latest in many controversies surrounding Cole, whose father Dickie Cole is the long time boxing commissioner of Texas.

=== Response ===
According to Boxing Insider, "Seriously, the guy had one fight – just one fight – to his name when he got a crack at the WBO Featherweight title. It was unheard of. It was beyond unheard of. In fact, it was literally a first," thus the attempt still being a record of its own.

Many boxing magazines mentioned that the referee allowed Salido to deliver an inordinate number of low blows. Salido was also criticized for failing to make weight and some sources stipulated that he did so intentionally, as well as coming back much heavier than Lomachenko on the fight night.

He was fighting a full welterweight, getting hit in the balls all night, in only his second pro bout, and he still almost came back to win.

— Machine Levine, Punch Lines Podcast

Lomachenko went on to tie the record for fewest bouts to a professional championship two months later, besting undefeated Gary Russell, Jr. for the WBO featherweight belt in his next match, on June 11.

== Undercard ==
Confirmed bouts:

Winner	Loser	Weight division/title belt(s) disputed	Result
(Mexico) Orlando Salido	(Ukraine) Vasiliy Lomachenko	vacant WBO Featherweight World Title	Split decision
Preliminary bouts
(United States) Juan Díaz	(United States) Gerardo Robles	Lightweight (10 rounds)	Unanimous decision
(United States) Ivan Najera	(United States) Ángel Hernández	Lightweight (8 rounds)	Unanimous decision
(United States) Jose Zepeda	(United States) Johnnie Edwards	Welterweight (8 rounds)	2nd round KO
(Mexico) Óscar Valdez	(United States) Samuel Sanchez	Super Featherweight (6 rounds)	3rd round TKO
(United States) Alex Saucedo	(United States) Gilbert Venegas	Welterweight (6 rounds)	Unanimous decision
Non-TV bouts
(United States) Jerren Cochran	(Mexico) Adauto Gonzalez	Super Featherweight (6 rounds)	Unanimous decision

== Broadcasting ==
Country	Broadcaster
Australia	Main Event
Hungary	Sport1
Mexico	Azteca
United Kingdom	BoxNation
United States	HBO

Preceded by vs. Orlando Cruz	Orlando Salido's bouts 1 March 2014	Succeeded by vs. Terdsak Kokietgym
Preceded by vs. Jose Ramirez	Vasiliy Lomachenko's bouts 1 March 2014	Succeeded by vs. Gary Russell, Jr.
