= Orlando Salido =

Mexican boxer (born 1980)

Personal information
- Nickname: Siri
- Born: Orlando Salido Rivera; November 16, 1980 (age 45) Ciudad Obregón, Sonora, Mexico
- Height: 5 ft 6 in (168 cm)
- Weight: Featherweight; Super featherweight

Boxing career
- Reach: 67 in (170 cm)
- Stance: Orthodox

Boxing record
- Total fights: 63
- Wins: 44
- Win by KO: 31
- Losses: 14
- Draws: 4
- No contests: 1

Orlando Salido Rivera (born November 16, 1980) is a Mexican former professional boxer who competed from 1996 to 2017. He held multiple world championships, including the International Boxing Federation (IBF) featherweight title in 2010, the World Boxing Organization (WBO) featherweight title twice between 2011 and 2014. He was the first person to defeat Vasiliy Lomachenko.

Salido is known for taking part in many classic fights, with his bout against Francisco Vargas being named 2016 Fight of the Year by several media outlets. Salido is also regarded for his upset wins over Juan Manuel López and Vasiliy Lomachenko.

== Professional career ==
=== Early career ===
Salido debuted as a professional in 1996, at the age of 15. Salido suffered several losses in his early career, sporting an 8–6–1 record after 15 fights. Salido was knocked out 5 times during this period, but he has not been stopped since March 2000. Salido faced former WBO super featherweight world champion Regilio Tuur on 23 November 2001, defeating him via split decision after eight rounds. Nine days later, he faced former WBC featherweight champion Alejandro Martín González but lost a majority decision after ten rounds. Salido then took a fight against IBF #1 featherweight contender Lamont Pearson on a weeks' notice. Salido got a decisive unanimous decision win, which introduced him to the sanctioning bodies' rankings, making him a title contender.

==== Salido vs. Marquez ====
Starting with the Pearson fight, Salido went on a nine fight undefeated streak before losing to IBF and WBA featherweight champion Juan Manuel Marquez by a 12-round unanimous decision in September 2004. The fight took place at the MGM Grand in Las Vegas on the undercard of undisputed middleweight unification fight between Bernard Hopkins and Oscar De La Hoya. Salido came into the fight very passive giving away many of the early and middle rounds, Marquez was successfully counter punching Salido and building a significant lead. Salido closed strong and won the later rounds but that wasn't enough. The three judges scored the fight 118–110, 117–111, 117–111.

Salido rebounded with a win over Rogers Mtagwa in an IBF eliminator. Salido stopped Mtagwa with a barrage of body punches, earning another title shot with the win.

==== Salido vs. Guerrero ====
On November 4, 2006, he defeated Robert Guerrero for the IBF featherweight title, by a unanimous decision. The official scorecards read 115–113, 118–110, 117–111. Salido's win over Guerrero was later overturned, as Salido tested positive for steroids after the fight. As a result of his positive test for Nandrolone, Salido was stripped of his title and faced disciplinary action in Nevada, which included a suspension.

Salido returned to the ring ten months later with an eighth round unanimous decision victory over journeyman Marty Robbins. In his next fight, he knocked out Hector Julio Avila in another IBF title eliminator.

=== IBF featherweight champion ===
==== Salido vs. Cristobal Cruz I, II ====
In late 2008, Salido had the opportunity to fight again for the IBF belt that he was forced to vacate due to his suspension, against Cristobal Cruz. Salido lost the bout via split decision. A judge scored it 115–113 for Salido, while the other two had it 116–112 for Cruz. Salido got off to a good start winning the first and middle rounds. Cruz never gave up and started to look better around the 8th and 9th rounds, forcing the action and closing the fight very strong. Many observers though that Salido deserved the victory because of the big lead that he built in the first 2 thirds of the fight.

After winning two fights against lower level opponents, Salido avenged the defeat in a rematch in May 2010. Salido knocked down Cruz twice in the 2nd round and pressed the action pounding Cruz for the entire fight. The final scorecards read 117–109, 117–109, and 116–110, all in favour of Salido. With the win, Salido became a world champion for the first time, at the age of 30.

==== Salido vs. Gamboa ====
On September 11, 2010, he faced WBA (Regular) featherweight champion Yuriorkis Gamboa at the Palms Casino Resort in Paradise, Nevada, in a unification bout. Salido lost a 12-round unanimous decision. The IBF title was only at stake for Gamboa as Salido was stripped of it prior to the fight due to weighing more than ten pounds over the weight limit at a second weigh-in on the morning of the event. Gamboa controlled much of the early rounds but was dropped in round 8. Gamboa returned the favour, knocking Salido down in the 12th round, but was docked 2 points for hitting Salido while he was on the canvas. The final scorecards read 116–109, 114–109, and 115–109, all for Gamboa. With the win, Gamboa became the first Cuban boxer to hold an IBF world title since the organizations inception.

=== WBO featherweight champion ===
==== Salido vs. López ====
On April 16, 2011, Salido fought undefeated WBO featherweight champion Juan Manuel López in Bayamón, Puerto Rico. López was a two-weight world champion, and had amassed seven consecutive defenses and a flawless 30–0 record. In a huge upset, Salido scored an eighth-round TKO over López to win the WBO featherweight title. After four competitive rounds, Salido floored López hard at the end of the fifth round and was again on the attack in the sixth round, but López survived. Salido launched an attack in round eight which made referee Roberto Ramirez Jr. wave the fight off, even though López was still fighting back, albeit with weak punches. The time of stoppage was 1:30. All three judges had the fight 66–66 even at the end of round seven.

Salido said, "The fight was even for the first four rounds, but I knew I had to pressure a lot to win because we are in Puerto Rico. I started to attack and he started opening up. That’s when I saw something where I could get in. He did recuperate for the first minute, but he was slowing down. Against Gamboa, I was not prepared. But today I was very prepared." Meanwhile, López said, "No, he was hitting me but they should not have stopped the fight. I was still conscious. I was still counter punching. The punch in the fifth hurt but I recouped. He is a very uncomfortable fighter. I could not block the right hand."

==== Salido vs. Yamaguchi ====
In June, it was announced that Salido would make his first defence at the Centro de Usos Multiples in Ciudad Obregon on July 23, 2011, against American contender Mike Oliver (24–2–0, 8 KOs). In July, it was reported that Salido would make his first defence against Japanese boxer Kenichi Yamaguchi (17–1–2, 4 KOs). Salido's original opponent Mike Oliver withdrew from the fight with injury. Salido knocked Yamaguchi down in round three and went on to dominate the fight before eventually stopping him in round eleven via TKO. Salido stated he wanted a rematch with López.

Salido then struggled to beat Weng Haya (15–4, 8 KOs) in a non-title bout in December 2011, as he went down in round 3 and round 4, before rallying, dropping and stopping Haya in round 8.

==== Salido vs. López II ====
On December 24, 2011, it was announced that Salido and Juan Manuel López would meet again this time in López's home country of Puerto Rico on March 31, 2012. With Salido defending his WBO title for the second time. In the fight, Salido wobbled López in the fifth round but was knocked down by López with a counter right hand as Salido went on the attack. Early in the tenth round, Salido landed a hard three punch combination, knocking López down. López came back on his feet, but was on very unsteady legs. Referee Roberto Ramirez waved the bout off. Although Salido dominated the bout by out-landing and outworking his López in every round except the first, two judges surprisingly had Lopez ahead, while one judge saw the bout as a draw after nine rounds. Round 9 emerged as 'Round of the Year' candidate as around 200 punches were thrown in toe-to-toe action. After the fight López said in an interview with Showtime that he felt he was dominating the bout and alleged that the referee stopped the fight early due to a gambling problem. Due to these comments the WBO suspended López for one year.

==== Salido vs. Garcia, Orlando Cruz ====
Salido, ranked #1 at featherweight at the time, took on Mikey Garcia on January 19, 2013, at the Madison Square Garden Theater in New York. Garcia dominated the bout from the very beginning, keeping Salido at range with the jab. Garcia knocked Salido down four times early on in the fight, building up a large lead on the scorecards. During the 8th round, Salido accidentally clashed heads with Garcia, causing Garcia's nose to break. The fight was stopped between rounds, with the decision going to the scorecards. Garcia won a wide unanimous decision (79–69, 79–69, 79–70), to win his first world title.

Garcia was stripped of his WBO featherweight title for failing to make weight in a title defence against Juan Manuel López in June 2013. Salido was matched up against Puerto Rican boxer Orlando Cruz for the vacant title. The fight took place on October 12, 2013, on the undercard of the Bradley-Marquez PPV. Salido stopped Cruz in the seventh round to regain the WBO featherweight title.

==== Salido vs. Lomachenko ====
Salido's first defense after regaining the WBO belt came against Vasiliy Lomachenko. Lomachenko was regarded as one of the best amateur boxers in history and was trying to make history by winning a world title in his second fight. Salido came in overweight, thus losing his title before the fight. Nevertheless, Salido won a split decision. Two judges had it for Salido, 116–112 and 115–113, while the third had it for Lomachenko 115–113. ESPN.com had the fight 114–114. Lomachenko, for his part, stated he felt the decision was "fair" and accepted blame for not following through with his corner's game plan, promising to learn from the experience and come back stronger. Many boxing analysts mentioned that the referee allowed Salido to deliver an inordinate number of low blows. Salido was also criticized for failing to make weight and some sources stipulated that he did so intentionally, as well as coming back much heavier than Lomachenko on the fight night.

=== Super featherweight ===
After failing to make weight in his last fight, Salido decided to move up to the super featherweight division. In his first fight at his new weight, he fought Thailand boxer Terdsak Kokietgym for the WBO Interim super featherweight title. In a fight which saw Salido dropped three times to the canvas and Kokietgym dropped four times. The stopped the bout after Kokietgym was knocked down in round 11, the count was eventually waived giving Salido the win and claiming the vacant WBO interim super featherweight title.

==== Salido vs. Martínez I, II ====
In February 2015, it was announced that Salido would fight WBO full champion Román Martínez (28–2–2, 17KOs) on April 11 in Puerto Rico. Salido came into this fight with a perfect record of (5–0, 4 KO's) against Puerto Rican fighters. Salido lost a 12-round unanimous decision to Martínez, also losing his title in the process. Salido was knocked down twice in the fight in rounds 3 and 5 and also docked a point for low blow in round 11 as Martinez won all three judges scorecards, who had it at 114–111, 115–110 and 116–109.

A rematch was announced and took place on the undercard of Mayweather vs. Berto at the MGM Grand Garden Arena in Las Vegas, the first time either fight had fought there. After a tough 12 rounds, which many believe was Salido's night, the judges scored the bout 115–113, 113–115 & 114–114, a split decision draw. Salido threw 1037 punches landing at a 27% connect rate whereas Martinez threw 691 but landed the same connect rate. Salido appeared upset in the post fight interview, re-iterating the fact that he thought he had done enough to win the fight based on his dedication to win.

==== Salido vs. Vargas ====
It was announced in March 2016 that Salido would attempt to capture the WBC super featherweight title on June 4 at the StubHub Center in Carson, California against Francisco Vargas. A rematch clause was attached to the contract in case Salido defeated Vargas. In what was described as a clear fight of the year candidate, Salido and Vargas fought to a 12-round majority draw. Two judges had it 114–114 whilst the third had it 115–113 for Vargas, who as a result retained his WBC title. Both fighters thought they had done enough to take the decision. The fight was shown on HBO's Boxing After Dark which averaged 833,000 viewers hitting a peak of 954,000 viewers.

==== After Vargas ====
After failing to claim a world title in his last two fights due to them ending in a draw, it was confirmed Salido would fight again on December 17 against Japanese boxer Takashi Miura for the interim WBC super featherweight title. Miura had lost the WBC title to Vargas in November 2015. Golden Boy Promotions announced the fight would take place at The Forum in Inglewood, California with the fight set to be the main event of an HBO Boxing After Dark card. The fight was supposed to a co-feature Bernard Hopkins final career fight against Joe Smith Jr. however Salido pulled out of the fight after injuring his sciatic nerve in training.

Salido was due to fight a tune up in Mexico on May 27, 2017, against Thailand boxer Pharanpetch Tor Buamas. He was replaced by Colombian boxer Aristides Pérez (30–9–2, 16 KOs) last minute due to Tor Buamas having visa issues. The fight was scheduled for 10 rounds. The fight took place at the Palenque del Expo in Ciudad Obregon, Sonora. After being dropped in round 3 from an uppercut, Salido fought his way back and stopped Perez at the end of round 7, when Perez's corner pulled him out. With this win, Salido ended his three-fight winless streak, having previously last won against Orlando Cruz in September 2014.

On September 28, 2017, it was reported that Salido would travel to Big Bear, California, to have a test run with Gennady Golovkin's trainer Abel Sanchez. Manager Sean Gibbons stated Salido would next fight on November 25 on the undercard of Sergey Kovalev vs. Vyacheslav Shabransky at the Madison Square Garden Theater in New York. A possible opponent for Salido was Puerto Rican boxer Jonathan Oquendo. On October 2, Gibbons stated that the conditions in the California mountains were not suited for Salido and he would head back to Mexico to train with physical trainer Memo Heredia and Santos Moreno. Gibbons told ESPN Deportes, Salido would likely now return on December 16 on HBO.

==== Salido vs. Román ====
On October 4, it was announced that a fight against WBC champion Miguel Berchelt (32–1, 28 KOs) was being discussed. On October 14, Gibbons told the LA Times that the fight had been finalized to take place on December 9, meaning it would fall on the same day as Vasiliy Lomachenko vs. Guillermo Rigondeaux. On October 23, sources indicated that Berchelt was still having issues with his right hand and would not be able to fight. A day later it was revealed promoters were trying to negotiate a rematch between Salido and Francisco Vargas to headline the card. Vargas was already scheduled to appear on the card. WBC president Mauricio Sulaiman stated he had no issues with the rematch, also stating the WBC Interim title could be at stake. On October 30, Ringtv announced that Salido would fight veteran Mexican boxer Miguel Román (57–12, 44 KOs) at the Mandalay Bay Events Center in Paradise, Nevada on December 9. On November 7, the WBC officially sanctioned the fight for the vacant WBC super featherweight interim title, however HBO scheduled the fight for 10 rounds. Sulaiman was not pleased with the decision, because he would not sanction a 10-round fight for a world title, thus meaning no title would be at stake.

Salido lost the fight via 9th-round TKO. He started the fight well hurting Román on a few occasions in the opening round. From round 2, Román began to take control of the fight and eventually dropped Salido in round 4. A three-punch combination also dropped Salido in the 8th round. In round 9, Román pinned Salido to the ropes and began to unload shots until Salido dropped down onto the canvas again. This was the first time Salido had been stopped since in over seventeen years. Referee Robert Byrd stopped the fight. In the post-fight, Salido said, “It’s a matter of age. It takes its toll. I’m done. This is it. This was it. I’m going.” The fight averaged 534,000 viewers on HBO.

=== Retirement talks ===
Immediately following the loss to Miguel Román, Salido announced his retirement. Immediately after the fight, he said, "As they say, father time is undefeated. All the wars I had caught up with me. I am leaving the ring knowing that I gave the fans as great a fight that I can give them. I hope they enjoyed it. The mind and heart were there, but my body just was not responding. Roman is a young fighter who gave his all, and I was not able to keep up with him. I [am] just an old fighter now." Four days later when Salido landed home in Phoenix, Arizona, he stated his retirement was over and he would be back in 2018. He said, "Saturday night I let my feelings and frustrations make me say things I did not think about. It was a tough and difficult fight in which I could not do the things that I needed to do in the ring, which I attributed to my age and the many wars I've had in my career."

== Personal life ==
Orlando Salido has a son, named Brayan Salido. He has driven for Uber in between fights.

Salido served a six-month prison sentence after his loss to Marquez due to car theft.

In May 2018, Salido was arrested for allegedly stealing 16 cans of beer. Salido was a candidate for local deputy for District XVI of Ciudad Obregon at the time.

In July 2018, it was announced that Saildo won the election in his hometown.

== Professional boxing record ==
| 63 fights | 44 wins | 14 losses |
|---|---|---|
| By knockout | 31 | 6 |
| By decision | 12 | 8 |
| By disqualification | 1 | 0 |
| Draws | 4 | |
| No contests | 1 | |

| No. | Result | Record | Opponent | Type | Round, time | Date | Location | Notes |
|---|---|---|---|---|---|---|---|---|
| 63 | Loss | 44–14–4 (1) | Miguel Román | TKO | 9 (10), 1:43 | Dec 9, 2017 | Mandalay Bay Events Center, Paradise, Nevada, U.S. | |
| 62 | Win | 44–13–4 (1) | Aristides Pérez | RTD | 7 (10), 3:00 | May 27, 2017 | Palenque del Expo, Ciudad Obregón, Mexico | |
| 61 | Draw | 43–13–4 (1) | Francisco Vargas | MD | 12 | Jun 4, 2016 | StubHub Center, Carson, California, U.S. | For WBC super featherweight title |
| 60 | Draw | 43–13–3 (1) | Román Martínez | SD | 12 | Sep 12, 2015 | MGM Grand Garden Arena, Paradise, Nevada, U.S. | For WBO super featherweight title |
| 59 | Loss | 43–13–2 (1) | Román Martínez | UD | 12 | Apr 11, 2015 | José Miguel Agrelot Coliseum, San Juan, Puerto Rico | Lost WBO super featherweight title |
| 58 | Win | 43–12–2 (1) | Terdsak Kokietgym | KO | 11 (12), 0:16 | Sep 20, 2014 | Auditorio Fausto Gutierrez Moreno, Tijuana, Mexico | Won WBO interim super featherweight title |
| 57 | Win | 42–12–2 (1) | Vasiliy Lomachenko | SD | 12 | Mar 1, 2014 | Alamodome, San Antonio, Texas, U.S. | Vacant WBO featherweight title at stake only for Lomachenko, as Salido missed weight |
| 56 | Win | 41–12–2 (1) | Orlando Cruz | TKO | 7 (12), 1:05 | Oct 12, 2013 | Thomas & Mack Center, Paradise, Nevada, U.S. | Won vacant WBO featherweight title |
| 55 | Loss | 40–12–2 (1) | Mikey Garcia | TD | 9 (12), 0:01 | Jan 19, 2013 | The Theater at Madison Square Garden, New York City, New York, U.S. | Lost WBO featherweight title; Unanimous TD: Garcia's nose broken from an accidental head clash |
| 54 | Win | 40–11–2 (1) | Moises Gutierrez | KO | 3 (10), 2:49 | Jul 28, 2012 | Palenque de la Feria, Tepic, Mexico | |
| 53 | Win | 39–11–2 (1) | Juan Manuel López | TKO | 10 (12), 0:32 | Mar 10, 2012 | Roberto Clemente Coliseum, San Juan, Puerto Rico | Retained WBO featherweight title |
| 52 | Win | 38–11–2 (1) | Weng Haya | TKO | 8 (10), 0:35 | Dec 17, 2011 | Palenque de la Feria, Ciudad Obregón, Mexico | |
| 51 | Win | 37–11–2 (1) | Kenichi Yamaguchi | TKO | 11 (12), 2:50 | Jul 23, 2011 | Centro de Usos Múltiples, Ciudad Obregón, Mexico | Retained WBO featherweight title |
| 50 | Win | 36–11–2 (1) | Juan Manuel López | TKO | 8 (12), 1:30 | Apr 16, 2011 | Coliseo Rubén Rodríguez, Bayamón, Puerto Rico | Won WBO featherweight title |
| 49 | Loss | 35–11–2 (1) | Yuriorkis Gamboa | UD | 12 | Sep 11, 2010 | Pearl Concert Theater, Paradise, Nevada, U.S. | For WBA (Regular) and vacant IBF featherweight titles |
| 48 | Win | 35–10–2 (1) | Cristóbal Cruz | UD | 12 | May 15, 2010 | Estadio Tomás Oroz Gaytán, Ciudad Obregón, Mexico | Won IBF featherweight title |
| 47 | Win | 34–10–2 (1) | Victor Rodriguez | KO | 5 (10) | Jul 31, 2009 | Centro de Espectacúlos, Ciudad Obregón, Mexico | |
| 46 | Win | 33–10–2 (1) | Leonardo Resendiz | TKO | 3 (8) | Jun 20, 2009 | Gimnasio Oscar "Tigre" García, Ensenada, Mexico | |
| 45 | Loss | 32–10–2 (1) | Cristóbal Cruz | SD | 12 | Oct 23, 2008 | Northern Quest Resort & Casino, Airway Heights, Washington, U.S. | For vacant IBF featherweight title |
| 44 | Win | 32–9–2 (1) | Ernesto Aboyte | DQ | 6 (10) | Jun 13, 2008 | Gimnasio Polifuncional, Hermosillo, Mexico | Aboyte disqualified for repeatedly spitting out his mouthpiece |
| 43 | Win | 31–9–2 (1) | Renan Acosta | TKO | 4 (10), 2:39 | Apr 26, 2008 | Plaza de Toros Provincia Juriquilla, Querétaro City, Mexico | |
| 42 | Win | 30–9–2 (1) | Héctor Avila | TKO | 6 (12), 1:57 | Dec 14, 2007 | Cicero Stadium, Cicero, Illinois, U.S. | |
| 41 | Win | 29–9–2 (1) | Marty Robbins | UD | 8 | Sep 14, 2007 | Congress Theater, Chicago, Illinois, U.S. | |
| 40 | Win | 28–9–2 (1) | Robinson Castellanos | TKO | 2 (10) | Jul 14, 2007 | Explanada Tecate, Ciudad Obregón, Mexico | |
| 39 | NC | 27–9–2 (1) | Robert Guerrero | UD | 12 | Nov 4, 2006 | Mandalay Bay Events Center, Paradise, Nevada, U.S. | IBF featherweight title at stake; Originally UD win for Salido, later ruled NC after he failed a drug test |
| 38 | Win | 27–9–2 | Franner Trinidad | TKO | 1 (10) | Aug 19, 2006 | Centro de Espectacúlos, Ciudad Obregón, Mexico | |
| 37 | Win | 26–9–2 | Rogers Mtagwa | TKO | 5 (12), 3:00 | Mar 18, 2006 | The Centre, Evansville, Indiana, U.S. | |
| 36 | Win | 25–9–2 | Leonardo Valdez | TKO | 1 (8) | Oct 15, 2005 | Domo de la Macroplaza, Nogales, Mexico | |
| 35 | Win | 24–9–2 | César Soto | PTS | 10 | May 6, 2005 | Ciudad Obregón, Mexico | |
| 34 | Loss | 23–9–2 | Juan Manuel Márquez | UD | 12 | Sep 18, 2004 | MGM Grand Garden Arena, Paradise, Nevada, U.S. | For WBA (Unified) and IBF featherweight titles |
| 33 | Win | 23–8–2 | Omar Adorno | KO | 4 (10), 4:10 | Apr 2, 2004 | Cancha Pepín Cestero, Bayamón, Puerto Rico | |
| 32 | Win | 22–8–2 | Alfred Kotey | UD | 10 | Oct 31, 2003 | Park 'n Swap, Phoenix, Arizona, U.S. | |
| 31 | Win | 21–8–2 | Fred Neal | TKO | 3 (10), 2:35 | Jul 11, 2003 | City Center Pavilion, Reno, Nevada, U.S. | |
| 30 | Win | 20–8–2 | Radford Beasley | TKO | 2 (10), 2:16 | May 30, 2003 | Kickapoo Lucky Eagle Casino, Eagle Pass, Texas, U.S. | |
| 29 | Win | 19–8–2 | Armando Córdoba | KO | 4 (10), 2:12 | Feb 22, 2003 | Arrowhead Pond, Anaheim, California, U.S. | |
| 28 | Win | 18–8–2 | Jorge Monzón | TKO | 4 (10), 2:53 | Dec 6, 2002 | Kickapoo Lucky Eagle Casino, Eagle Pass, Texas, U.S. | |
| 27 | Win | 17–8–2 | Carlos Gerena | MD | 10 | Sep 6, 2002 | Community Center, Victoria, Texas, U.S. | |
| 26 | Win | 16–8–2 | Juan Ruiz | KO | 7 | Mar 26, 2002 | Mexico | |
| 25 | Win | 15–8–2 | Lamont Pearson | UD | 10 | Mar 22, 2002 | Celebrity Theatre, Phoenix, Arizona, U.S. | |
| 24 | Loss | 14–8–2 | Alejandro Martín González | MD | 10 | Dec 2, 2001 | Grand Victoria Casino, Elgin, Illinois, U.S. | |
| 23 | Win | 14–7–2 | Regilio Tuur | SD | 8 | Nov 23, 2001 | Roseland Ballroom, New York City, New York, U.S. | |
| 22 | Win | 13–7–2 | Michael Jamison | TKO | 1 (6), 2:59 | Jul 8, 2001 | Texas Station, North Las Vegas, Nevada, U.S. | |
| 21 | Win | 12–7–2 | Dustin Kim | TKO | 5 (8), 1:38 | Jun 15, 2001 | The Orleans, Paradise, Nevada, U.S. | |
| 20 | Draw | 11–7–2 | Mark Burse | SD | 8 | May 18, 2001 | The Orleans, Paradise, Nevada, U.S. | |
| 19 | Loss | 11–7–1 | William Abelyan | UD | 6 | Mar 23, 2001 | Sports Center, Owensboro, Kentucky, U.S. | |
| 18 | Win | 11–6–1 | Victor Manuel Mendoza | KO | 5 | Oct 27, 2000 | Mexico | |
| 17 | Win | 10–6–1 | Rubén Estanislao | TKO | 9 (10) | Sep 16, 2000 | Mexico City, Mexico | |
| 16 | Win | 9–6–1 | Iván Feliciano | KO | 4 | Jul 14, 2000 | Mexico | |
| 15 | Loss | 8–6–1 | Ivan Valle | KO | 4 (10) | Mar 31, 2000 | Auditorio Benito Juárez, Los Mochis, Mexico | |
| 14 | Win | 8–5–1 | Ricardo Ramírez | KO | 3 | Feb 18, 2000 | Ciudad Obregón, Mexico | |
| 13 | Win | 7–5–1 | Ramón Aragón | PTS | 10 | Oct 9, 1998 | Ciudad Obregón, Mexico | |
| 12 | Loss | 6–5–1 | José Luis Montes | KO | 7 | Feb 13, 1998 | Mexico | |
| 11 | Loss | 6–4–1 | Daniel Rodríguez | TKO | 8 | Nov 12, 1997 | Tijuana, Mexico | |
| 10 | Win | 6–3–1 | Ernesto Medina | TKO | 5 (10) | Aug 29, 1997 | Ciudad Obregón, Mexico | Won vacant Sonora super bantamweight title |
| 9 | Draw | 5–3–1 | Lázaro Padilla | PTS | 10 | Jun 27, 1997 | Mexico | |
| 8 | Win | 5–3 | Ricardo Medina | KO | 6 (10) | Apr 18, 1997 | Ciudad Obregón, Mexico | |
| 7 | Loss | 4–3 | Héctor Guzmán | TKO | 3 (10) | Jan 31, 1997 | Centro de Espectáculos, Mexicali, Mexico | |
| 6 | Loss | 4–2 | Iván Cazarez | PTS | 6 | Nov 22, 1996 | Centro de Espectáculos, Mexicali, Mexico | |
| 5 | Win | 4–1 | Ventura Mendivil | PTS | 8 | Oct 4, 1996 | Ciudad Obregón, Mexico | |
| 4 | Win | 3–1 | Ricardo Medina | PTS | 4 | Sep 20, 1996 | Mexico | |
| 3 | Win | 2–1 | Julio Alberto Leal | PTS | 4 | Sep 2, 1996 | Mexicali, Mexico | |
| 2 | Win | 1–1 | Jesús Osorio | TKO | 2 (4) | Aug 17, 1996 | Mexico | |
| 1 | Loss | 0–1 | Iván Cazarez | TKO | 4 | Mar 1, 1996 | Parque Vicente Guerrero, Mexicali, Mexico | |

== Titles in boxing ==
=== Major world titles ===
- IBF featherweight champion (126 lbs)
- WBO featherweight champion (126 lbs) (2x)
- WBO junior lightweight champion (130 lbs)

=== Regional/International titles ===
- WBO interim junior lightweight champion (130 lbs)

== See also ==
- List of Mexican boxing world champions
- List of IBF world champions
- List of WBO world champions
- List of featherweight boxing champions
- List of super featherweight boxing champions

Sporting positions
World boxing titles
| Preceded by Cristóbal Cruz | IBF featherweight champion May 15, 2010 – September 11, 2010; Stripped | Vacant Title next held by Yuriorkis Gamboa |
| Preceded by Juan Manuel López | WBO featherweight champion April 16, 2011 – January 19, 2013 | Succeeded by Mikey Garcia |
| Vacant Title last held by Mikey Garcia | WBO featherweight champion October 12, 2013 – February 28, 2014; Stripped | Vacant Title next held by Vasiliy Lomachenko |
| Preceded by Alex Arthur promoted to world champion | WBO junior lightweight champion Interim title September 20, 2014 – October 14, 2014; Promoted | Vacant Title next held by Miguel Berchelt |
| Preceded by Mikey Garcia vacated | WBO junior lightweight champion October 14, 2014 – April 11, 2015 | Succeeded by Román Martínez |
Awards
| Previous: Francisco Vargas vs. Takashi Miura | The Ring Fight of the Year vs. Francisco Vargas; 2016 | Next: Anthony Joshua vs. Wladimir Klitschko |
| Previous: Francisco Vargas vs. Takashi Miura | BWAA Fight of the Year vs. Francisco Vargas; 2016 | Next: Anthony Joshua vs. Wladimir Klitschko |
| Previous: Francisco Vargas vs. Takashi Miura | ESPN Fight of the Year vs. Francisco Vargas; 2016 | Next: Anthony Joshua vs. Wladimir Klitschko |
