= Juan Manuel Márquez vs. Manny Pacquiao =

Boxing match

Hearts and Fists on Fire
- Date: May 8, 2004
- Venue: MGM Grand Garden Arena, Paradise, Nevada, U.S.
- Title(s) on the line: WBA (Unified), IBF, and The Ring featherweight titles

Tale of the tape
Boxer	Juan Manuel Márquez	Manny Pacquiao
Nickname	Dinamita ("Dynamite")	Pac-Man
Hometown	Mexico City, Mexico	General Santos, Philippines
Purse	$500,000	$500,000
Pre-fight record	42–2 (33 KO)	38–2–1 (29 KO)
Age	30 years, 8 months	25 years, 4 months
Height	5 ft 7 in (170 cm)	5 ft 6 in (168 cm)
Weight	125 lb (57 kg)	125 lb (57 kg)
Style	Orthodox	Southpaw
Recognition	WBA (Unified) and IBF; Featherweight Champion; The Ring; No. 1 Ranked Featherweight	The Ring; Featherweight Champion; WBA; No. 1 Ranked Featherweight; IBF; No. 2 Ranked Featherweight; The Ring No. 5 ranked pound-for-pound fighter 3-division world champion

Result
- 12-round split draw (115–110, 113–113, 110–115)

Juan Manuel Márquez vs. Manny Pacquiao, billed as Hearts and Fists on Fire, was a professional boxing match contested on May 8, 2004, for the WBA (Unified), IBF, and The Ring featherweight titles.

== Background ==
On November 1, 2003, reigning IBF featherweight champion Juan Manuel Márquez captured the WBA version of the title after defeating Derrick Gainer via technical decision on the undercard of the Floyd Mayweather Jr.–Phillip N'dou lightweight title fight. Two weeks later IBF super bantamweight champion Manny Pacquiao made his featherweight debut, defeating Marco Antonio Barrera by 11th-round technical knockout to claim The Ring featherweight title and lay claim to the lineal featherweight championship.

Following his impressive and decisive victory over Barrera, Pacquiao's fame and popularity began to rise leading to him signing an multi-million dollar deal with HBO allowing the channel to exclusively broadcast his fights. After the HBO deal was signed, Pacquiao's promoter Murad Muhammad agreed to terms with Márquez's promoter Bob Arum that would see Pacquiao face Márquez on May 8, 2004.

Though Márquez had competed as a featherweight for over a decade while Pacquiao was a newcomer to the division, it was Pacquiao that was installed as the minus 170 favorite with Márquez a plus 150 underdog. Both fighters planned to move up to super featherweight and had potential big title fights lined up should they be victorious. Márquez tentatively expected to challenge IBF featherweight champion Carlos Hernández while Pacquiao had agreed to face WBA super featherweight champion Erik Morales. Pacquiao's already announced plans to challenge Morales and his perceived overlooking of Márquez annoyed Márquez who stated "He can talk all he wants about his next fight, I’m just concentrating and being serious about this one."

== The fight ==
Pacquiao got off to a great start, scoring three knockdowns on Márquez during the first round. The first, which came just under halfway through the round, was a flash knockdown in which Márquez got back up quickly and did not appear to be seriously hurt, however only 20 seconds later, Pacquiao sent Márquez down again with a left hand. Then with around 40 seconds left, another left sent Márquez sprawling into the ropes, which temporarily held him up before another Pacquiao landed another punch which sent him down for a third time. Márquez answered the referee's count at eight and though Pacquiao furiously attacked Márquez in hopes of ending the fight, Márquez survived the round though his nose was bloodied and he was clearly disorientated. Though his poor first round left him in a large hole on the scorecards, Márquez was able to rebound and the remainder of the fight was a close back-and-forth contest that went the full 12-round distance. When the fight went to the scorecards, judge John Stewart had scored the fight 115–110 in favor of Pacquiao, judge Guy Jutras also scored the fight 115–110 but in favor of Márquez and Burt A. Clements scored it a draw at 113–113 resulting in a split draw.

== Aftermath ==
=== Controversy ===
There was controversy regarding the official scoring of the fight as judge Burt A. Clements had scored the first round 10–7 in favor of Pacquiao rather than 10–6 as the other judges had which would have given Pacquiao a split decision victory. Clements admitted that he did not realize that he could score a round 10–6 and took responsibility for his error stating "I feel badly because I dropped the ball, plainly and simply. You can make a lot of arguments that it was a very close fight, but that's immaterial. The fact is, I dropped the ball." There was also controversy surrounding judge Guy Jutras' scorecard. The Pacquiao camp had objected his selection prior to the fight and after scoring the first round 10–6 in favor of Pacquiao, only had him winning one other round while scoring the other 10 rounds in Márquez's favor. Finally Pacquaio's promoter Murad Muhammad criticized referee Joe Cortez for allowing the fight to continue after Pacquiao had scored his third knockdown over Márquez in the first round, complaining to the media "He grabbed my kid and I'm coming up the steps, the fight is over, but then he lets the fight go on."

== Fight card ==
Confirmed bouts:

Weight Class	Weight		vs.		Method	Round	Notes
Featherweight	126 lbs.	Juan Manuel Márquez (c)	vs.	Manny Pacquiao (c)	D	12/12	^{Note 1}
Super Lightweight	140 lbs.	Miguel Cotto (c)	def.	Lovemore N'dou	UD	12/12	^{Note 2}
Super Middleweight	168 lbs.	Antwun Echols	def.	Ross Thompson	UD	10/10
Middleweight	160 lbs.	Hasan Al	def.	Quandray Robertson	TKO	6/8
Lightweight	135 lbs.	Juan Ramon Cruz	vs.	Adam Gonzalez	NC	3/8

^Note 1 For WBA, IBF, The Ring and lineal featherweight titles
^Note 2 For WBC International and vacant WBA Fedelatin Super Lightweight titles

== Broadcasting ==
Country	Broadcaster
Mexico	TV Azteca
Philippines	Solar Sports / RPN 9
United Kingdom	Sky Sports
United States	HBO

== See also ==
- Juan Manuel Márquez vs. Manny Pacquiao II
- Manny Pacquiao vs. Juan Manuel Márquez III
- Manny Pacquiao vs. Juan Manuel Márquez IV

Preceded by vs. Derrick Gainer	Juan Manuel Márquez's bouts 8 May 2004	Succeeded by vs. Orlando Salido
Preceded by vs. Marco Antonio Barrera	Manny Pacquiao's bouts 8 May 2004	Succeeded by vs. Narongrit Pirang
