= Guy Jutras =

Canadian boxing referee and boxing judge (1931–2026)

Personal information
- Nickname: Guy Jutras
- Nationality: Canadian
- Born: Guy Joseph Jutras; March 22, 1931 Montreal, Quebec, Canada
- Died: April 3, 2026 (aged 95) Canada
- Height: 5 ft 8 in (173cm)
- Weight: Welterweight

Boxing career

Boxing record
- Total fights: 5
- Wins: 5
- Losses: 0

Guy Joseph Jutras (March 22, 1931 – April 3, 2026) was a Canadian boxing referee and judge. He was inducted into the International Boxing Hall of Fame in 2019.

== Early life ==
Guy Joseph Jutras was born on March 22, 1931, in Montreal, Canada.

== Amateur boxing career ==
Jutras, who grew up without a father in Montreal's east end, was known for his street fighting. He found discipline in Montreal's amateur boxing scene before joining the Royal Canadian Navy.

He earned back-to-back amateur titles, winning the 1950 Maritime Provinces Golden Gloves and the 1951 Royal Canadian Navy welterweight championship.

== Professional career ==
=== Boxer ===
His professional debut came on September 29, 1952. He fought four of his five professional bouts within a five-week span at the Valley Arena Gardens, winning three by knockout.

He used earnings from professional boxing to pay for his college education. At Springfield College in Massachusetts, Jutras studied to become a physical education teacher. After graduating from Springfield with a B.Sc. degree in 1955, he made his way back to Montreal. His mother, the first female broker in Quebec, provided his education in the insurance industry. He began working for an insurance company, a position he held for 17 years. While working in insurance, he maintained a strong love for boxing and began refereeing amateur fights.

=== Referee ===
Beginning in 1969, Jutras started his career as a pro referee. His first official event involved refereeing a fight with Donato Paduano. At the Montreal Forum in 1978, he refereed his first Canadian title fight between lightweights Gaétan Hart and Cleveland Denny. The World Boxing Association recruited Jutras to referee at the professional level in 1979. After being scouted by a WBA member and invited to seminars, he officiated a bout and impressed enough officials to gain clearance from the committee.

Jutras earned a reputation as a fighter's referee, someone who stayed out of the way and let the boxers determine the outcome. He drew criticism from Montreal fans when he stopped the 1980 Gaétan Hart–Ralph Racine bout in the 11th round. His decision proved sound moments later when Racine collapsed and was rushed to hospital for emergency brain surgery.

Jutras refereed the controversial Eusebio Pedroza–Juan Laporte featherweight title bout in Atlantic City on January 24, 1982. The New Jersey State Athletic Commission attempted to reverse Pedroza's decision win afterward, stating the referee should have disqualified him for repeated fouls. Justras received a six-month suspension. He was later exonerated at a WBA hearing.

The Montrealer traveled to London, England, to serve as the referee of Frank Bruno vs. Gerrie Coetzee at Wembley Stadium in 1987.

Following his retirement from refereeing at age 67, he continued working as a judge for the WBA.

=== Judge ===
His judging career spanned from 1980 to 2011. In November 1982, he served as a judge for the bout between Fulgencio Obelmejias and Marvin Hagler in Italy. Jutras was originally appointed referee by the WBA for the November 1983 Marvelous Marvin Hagler vs. Roberto Duran middleweight title fight in Las Vegas but was replaced and served instead as one of the judges. His judging resume also includes world championship fights such as Wilfredo Gómez vs. Rocky Lockridge (1985), Barry McGuigan vs. Steve Cruz (1986), Vinny Paz vs. Gilbert Dele (1991), Pernell Whitaker vs. Julio César Vásquez (1995), Paulie Ayala vs. Johnny Tapia I (1999), and Juan Manuel Márquez vs. Manny Pacquiao (2004).

Jutras combined his media work as a television commentator and radio host (1997–2009) with his role as co-founder and assistant matchmaker for Interbox Promotions (1997–2002). Interbox was a boxing promotion company that organized events in both Montreal and the United States.

== Death ==
Jutras died on April 3, 2026, at the age of 95.

== Legacy ==
Over his officiating career, Guy Jutras judged or refereed more than 75 world championship contests. He traveled widely for his officiating duties, covering major American cities and countries such as England, Spain, France, Germany, Mexico, Venezuela, Costa Rica, Puerto Rico, Panama, Thailand, and Japan.

Jutras was inducted into the Canadian Boxing Hall of Fame in 1979 and into the International Boxing Hall of Fame on June 9, 2019. He entered the Hall of Fame as its fourth inductee from Quebec.
