= Kenny Bayless =

American boxing referee (born 1950)

- Born: May 4, 1950 (age 76)
- Occupation: Boxing referee
- Spouse: Lynora
- Children: 3
- Website: KennyBayless.com

Kenny Bayless (born May 4, 1950) is an American retired boxing referee from Nevada. He is best known for having refereed many of the sport's most well-known fights.

Bayless' catchphrase, when giving his instructions to the fighters before the opening bell, is "What I say you must obey" which was given to him by one of his sons who suggested that he'd use a catchphrase because of Bayless' long time friend Mills Lane saying "Let's get it on!"

Kenny Bayless was raised in Berkeley, California. After graduating from college, he was recruited to teach school in Las Vegas. He was happy for the job opportunity but excited for the chance to relocate to a city with a thriving boxing scene.

Around the same time, he became friends with Johnny Lehman, a glove man for several promoters and a boxing inspector for the Nevada State Athletic Commission. Kenny assisted Johnny in his various tasks which allowed him access to more fights and the opportunity to compare his scorecards with the professionals. Jerry Roth, a Nevada boxing judge, was a mentor he regularly sought out. Jerry asked him one day, “Why don’t you try refereeing?” Kenny thought about it and decided, “Why not?” He sought the help of former Nevada referee, Richard Steele, and prepared himself to enter the ring as an amateur referee in 1982. In 1985 Kenny was hired by the Nevada Athletic Commission. He worked corners as an inspector and continued volunteering with the amateur program with the hopes of eventually becoming a professional referee. After 12 years of refereeing for Golden Gloves, and 6 years with the Commission, his opportunity finally came.

In 1991 Kenny was appointed as a professional referee. He officiated his first world title fight in 1994. He has been third man in the ring for thousands of bouts and over 100 title fights. Kenny was inducted into the Nevada Boxing Hall of Fame in 2014.

On Sunday April 23rd 2023, Kenny and his identical twin brother Kermit Bayless (Boxing Judge) were both inducted into the National Boxing Hall of Fame.

== Career ==
=== Notable fights ===
- 2004: Antonio Tarver vs. Roy Jones Jr.
- 2004: Bernard Hopkins vs. Oscar De La Hoya
- 2006: Manny Pacquiao vs. Érik Morales II
- 2006: Shane Mosley vs. Fernando Vargas
- 2007: Oscar De La Hoya vs. Floyd Mayweather Jr.
- 2008: Juan Manuel Márquez vs. Manny Pacquiao II
- 2008: Miguel Cotto vs. Antonio Margarito
- 2009: Manny Pacquiao vs. Ricky Hatton
- 2009: Manny Pacquiao vs. Miguel Cotto
- 2010: Floyd Mayweather Jr. vs. Shane Mosley
- 2011: Manny Pacquiao vs. Shane Mosley
- 2012: Amir Khan vs. Danny García
- 2012: Manny Pacquiao vs. Juan Manuel Márquez IV
- 2013: Floyd Mayweather Jr. vs. Canelo Álvarez
- 2014: Manny Pacquiao vs. Timothy Bradley II
- 2014: Floyd Mayweather Jr. vs. Marcos Maidana II
- 2014: Andy Lee vs. Matt Korobov
- 2015: Floyd Mayweather Jr. vs. Manny Pacquiao
- 2015: Floyd Mayweather Jr. vs. Andre Berto
- 2016: Canelo Álvarez vs. Amir Khan
- 2016: Manny Pacquiao vs. Jessie Vargas
- 2017: Canelo Álvarez vs. Gennady Golovkin
- 2018: Oleksandr Usyk vs. Mairis Briedis
- 2018: Manny Pacquiao vs. Lucas Matthysse
- 2019: Manny Pacquiao vs. Keith Thurman
- 2019: Tyson Fury vs. Tom Schwarz
- 2019: Deontay Wilder vs. Luis Ortiz II
- 2020: Deontay Wilder vs. Tyson Fury II
- 2021: Josh Taylor vs. José Ramírez
