= Joel Casamayor vs. Juan Manuel Márquez =

Boxing competition

The Challenge
- Date: September 13, 2008
- Venue: MGM Grand Garden Arena, Paradise, Nevada, U.S.
- Title(s) on the line: The Ring lightweight title

Tale of the tape
| Boxer | Joel Casamayor | Juan Manuel Márquez |
| Nickname | El Cepillo ("The Brush") | Dinamita ("Dynamite") |
| Hometown | Guantanamo, Cuba | Mexico City, Mexico |
| Pre-fight record | 36–3–1 (17 KO) | 48–4–1 (36 KO) |
| Age | 37 years, 2 months | 35 years |
| Height | 5 ft 7 in (170 cm) | 5 ft 7 in (170 cm) |
| Weight | 135 lb (61 kg) | 135 lb (61 kg) |
| Style | Southpaw | Orthodox |
| Recognition | The Ring lightweight champion 2-division world champion | The Ring No. 2 ranked pound-for-pound fighter 2-division world champion |

Result
- Márquez wins via 11th-round TKO

Joel Casamayor vs. Juan Manuel Márquez, billed as The Challenge, was a boxing lightweight world championship fight for Casamayor's lineal world and The Ring lightweight title. It was held on September 13, 2008 at the MGM Grand Garden Arena in Las Vegas, Nevada, U.S.

== The fight ==
Márquez defeated Casamayor in the 11th round after two knockdowns, and captured his sixth world title in three different weight classes.

In the first four rounds of the bout, Márquez continually walked into counter punches from Casamayor. It took Márquez until the fifth round to be able to find the range with his right hand. By the fifth round, a cut over Casamayor's right eye was opened from a clash of heads. Rounds five, six, seven, and eight were rounds where Márquez landed straight punches from the outside, but he was also struck by Casamayor whenever he lunged forward. Two minutes into the eleventh round, Casamayor was knocked down by a right punch as he pulled away from an intense exchange. Casamayor was able to get on his feet, but it was clear he was still shakey from the knockdown. As soon as the action was allowed to resume, Márquez went in for the kill as he let his punches go in furious combination. Casamayor punched back, but he was knocked down again with about 7 seconds left in the round. Referee Tony Weeks stepped in the bout, and stopped the fight as he deemed Casamyor unable to continue. The official judges had the fight scored 95-95, 95-95, and 97-93 for Márquez before the 11th-round knockout.

== Aftermath ==
After the win, Ring magazine ranked Márquez second on its pound for pound list, and rated him as the lightweight champion.

== Undercard ==
Confirmed bouts:

== Broadcasting ==
| Country | Broadcaster |
|---|---|
| Mexico | Televisa |
| United States | HBO |

| Preceded by vs. Michael Katsidis | Joel Casamayor's bouts 13 September 2008 | Succeeded by vs. Jason Davis |
| Preceded by vs. Manny Pacquiao II | Juan Manuel Márquez's bouts 13 September 2008 | Succeeded by vs. Juan Díaz |
