= Fran Charles =

American sportscaster (born 1968)

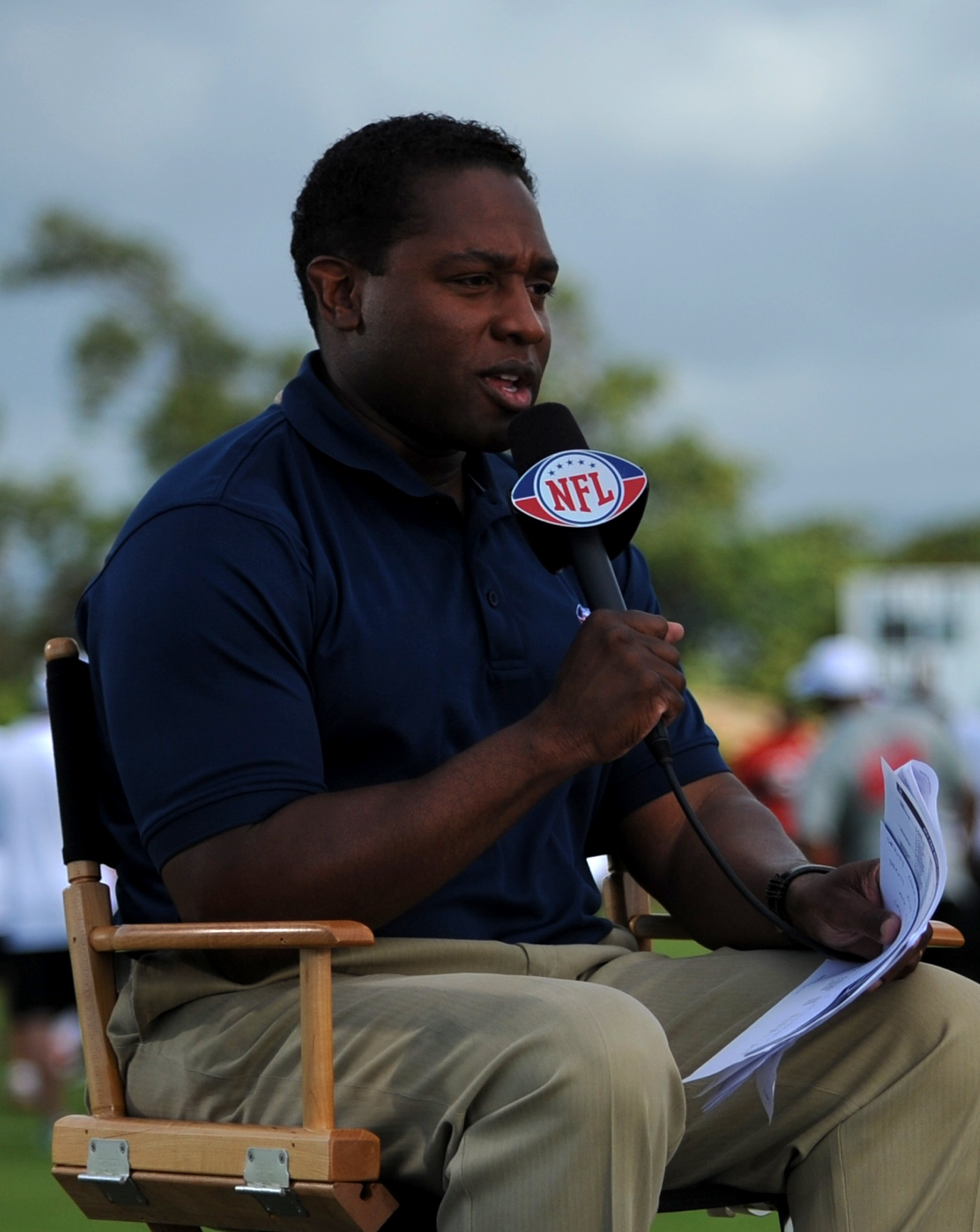
- Charles in 2012
- Born: October 29, 1968 (age 57); St. Louis, Missouri, U.S.
- Education: Stanford University; Columbia School of Journalism
- Occupation: Sportscaster
- Employer(s): MLB Network; NFL Network; NBC Sports; HBO Sports

Fran Charles (born October 19, 1968) is an American television personality formerly for MLB Network, formerly for NFL Network.

== Career ==
Charles attended John Burroughs School in Ladue, Missouri; then earned a Bachelor's degree in Communication at Stanford University and a Master's degree from the Columbia School of Journalism.

Charles began his career in broadcasting in St. Louis, Missouri, as an overnight reporter, news writer and assignment editor at KSDK-TV. A year later, he became a weekend sports anchor at WDTN in Dayton, Ohio. After three years in Dayton, Charles became the weekend sports anchor at WHDH-TV in Boston.

Charles served as the blow-by-blow announcer for the HBO Sports series Boxing After Dark from 2000 to 2007 and has also worked on KO Nation, HBO Pay-Per-View Boxing and World Championship Boxing.

From 2002 to 2006, Charles was the host of the weekly golf show, PGA Tour Sunday on USA Network, serving as lead anchor for studio segments during PGA Tour events.

Charles was also an anchor and reporter for NBC Sports, where he anchored the weekend Sportsdesk show and provided live reports and interviews for NBA on NBC. He also anchored sports at WNBC in New York City while working for NBC Sports.

At the start of the 2006 season, Charles joined NFL Network, where he shared duties as host of NFL Total Access with Rich Eisen. From 2010 to 2013, Charles hosted NFL GameDay Final, joining Steve Mariucci, Deion Sanders and Michael Irvin to review each Sunday's action with highlights, interviews, and analysis from each game. During that time, he also co-hosted NFL Network's Thursday Night Kickoff Presented by Sears from Los Angeles alongside analysts Kurt Warner, Sterling Sharpe, Jay Glazer, Brian Billick and Jim Mora. He was also a studio host for NFL Network's coverage of the Arena Football League.

Charles was portrayed in EA Sports' Madden NFL 10 as the main host of “The Extra Point”, a weekly recap show that broke down the highs and lows in a network-style show. Alex Flanagan was his co-host.

Charles made his MLB Network debut as studio host during the 2013 World Baseball Classic on March 9. On February 20, 2023, it was reported that Charles had been let go by MLB Network.
