= KO Nation =

American boxing television series

KO Nation is an American television series which featured up-and-coming boxers in a hip-hop format. Shown on HBO every Saturday afternoon (later moved to late-night in January 2001) from May 6, 2000 until August 11, 2001, the show featured dancers and hip-hop performances, and was hosted by Fran Charles and Kevin Kelley. Former Yo! MTV Raps video jockey Ed Lover was the "face" of the show, and was the ring announcer. The show ultimately failed to attract its target audience, drew low Nielsen ratings, and was cancelled on August 11, 2001.
