= Boxing After Dark =

HBO sports program (1996-2018)

- Genre: Sports
- Starring: various
- Country of origin: United States

Original release
- Network: HBO
- Release: February 3, 1996 – December 8, 2018

Related
- HBO World Championship Boxing

Boxing After Dark is an HBO boxing program, premiered on February 3, 1996, that usually showed fights between well-known contenders, but usually not "championship" or "title" fights. Unlike its sister program, HBO World Championship Boxing, BAD featured fighters who were usually moving up from ESPN's Friday Night Fights or another basic cable boxing program. This was where fighters were given their start to become famous depending on how well they fare on BAD they might have a title fight on World Championship Boxing or could fall back (Ex: Jason Litzau had many entertaining fights on ESPN before moving up to BAD to face Jose Hernandez. After Litzau lost by knockout he returned to FNF)

It usually aired at least once a month, following a World Championship Boxing card on HBO. Boxing After Dark debuted on HBO Canada beginning January 17, 2009 at 9:45 pm. ET/7:45 pm. MT

== History ==
Boxing After Dark, or BAD for short, got its start on February 3, 1996 with commentators Jim Lampley and Larry Merchant. The first fight shown was an exciting 12-rounder featuring a then-unknown Marco Antonio Barrera and Kennedy McKinney. Barrera won by KO. Since then, BAD has prided itself on promoting fights between lesser-caliber fighters with something to prove, though occasionally well-known fighters, usually those signed by HBO, may make appearances.

=== Tenth season revamp ===
In 2006, BAD entered its tenth season with an all-new lineup. Lampley, Merchant and Emanuel Steward would now call only WCB and pay-per-view fights. Replacing them were Fran Charles, former ESPN and Fox Sports Net analyst Max Kellerman who received "something in the neighborhood of $10,000 for each Boxing After Dark telecast" (according to Thomas Hauser) and former world heavyweight champion Lennox Lewis. Kellerman and Lewis had previously appeared on world championship and pay-per-view events for HBO as analysts and continue to do so. This season has featured mostly fights at lesser weights, a BAD staple, as well as new theme music and logo. On March 13, 2007, Fran Charles was replaced by Bob Papa due to scheduling conflicts with the NFL Network. Lampley has also on occasion stepped in for Charles and Papa.

Beginning in 2013, the teams for BAD and World Championship Boxing became identical. Lampley, Kellerman, and Roy Jones Jr. called all boxing events for HBO with rare exceptions. Andre Ward and Bernard Hopkins served as substitutes for Jones.

=== The end of Boxing After Dark ===
On September 27, 2018, HBO announced they would be dropping boxing from the network following its last televised match on October 27, although there was an additional airing on December 8, 2018. Several reasons were given for the cancellation, including rapidly declining ratings, an increasing number of options for boxing on other channels, surveys that showed boxing was no longer one of the reasons people purchased HBO subscriptions, a lack of marquee boxing contests, and HBO corporate position that the service is "not a sports network."

== See also ==
- HBO World Championship Boxing (a television boxing program airing on HBO from 1973–2018)
- Showtime Championship Boxing (a television boxing program airing on Showtime from 1986–present)
- ShoBox: The New Generation (a television boxing program airing on Showtime from 2001–present)
- Premier Boxing Champions (a boxing promotion organized by Al Haymon and a television boxing program airing on multiple broadcast and cable networks from 2015–present)
- Superfly (boxing)
