= Aristides Pérez =

Colombian boxer (born 1981)

Personal information
- Nickname: Papa
- Nationality: (Colombia) Colombian
- Born: Aristides Pérez Torres; May 20, 1981 (age 45) Cartagena, Colombia
- Height: 5 ft 9 in (1.75 m)
- Weight: Light Welterweight; Lightweight; Super Featherweight; Featherweight

Boxing career
- Reach: 71 in (182 cm)
- Stance: Southpaw

Boxing record
- Total fights: 45
- Wins: 31
- Win by KO: 17
- Losses: 12
- Draws: 2
- No contests: 0

Aristides Pérez Torres (born May 20, 1981) is a professional Colombian boxer in the Lightweight division and is the former Colombian National Featherweight champion.

== Pro career ==
=== Colombia Featherweight Championship ===
In April 2008, Aristides beat the undefeated Luis Carlos Martinez to win the Colombian National Featherweight championship.

=== WBC Super Featherweight Championship ===
On September 15, 2009, Perez was knocked out by WBC Super Featherweight champion Humberto Soto in just two rounds.
