= Juan Manuel Márquez =

Mexican world champion boxer (born 1973)

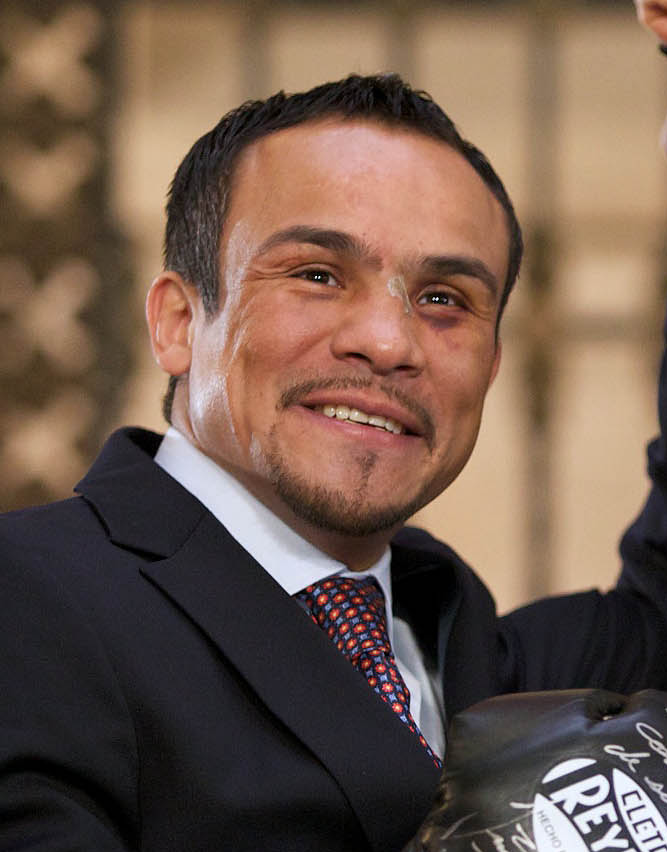
- Márquez in 2012

Personal information
- Nickname: Dinamita ("Dynamite")
- Born: Juan Manuel Márquez Méndez; August 23, 1973 (age 53) Iztacalco, Mexico City, Mexico
- Height: 5 ft 7 in (170 cm)
- Weight: Featherweight; Super featherweight; Lightweight; Light welterweight; Welterweight

Boxing career
- Reach: 67 in (170 cm)
- Stance: Orthodox

Boxing record
- Total fights: 64
- Wins: 56
- Win by KO: 40
- Losses: 7
- Draws: 1

Juan Manuel Márquez Méndez (born August 23, 1973) is a Mexican former professional boxer who competed from 1993 to 2014. He held multiple world championships in four weight classes, from featherweight to light welterweight, including the lineal championship at lightweight.

In a career that spanned over twenty years, Márquez was known for being a fast and highly technical boxer who was exceptionally skilled at combinations and counterpunches, yet also willing to engage in slugfests with opponents. He was also credited for his toughness, and never lost a fight by stoppage. His most notable bouts include his four-fight saga with Manny Pacquiao and his fight against fellow Mexican Marco Antonio Barrera.

Márquez was named The Ring magazine Fighter of the Year in 2012. He is considered to be one of the greatest boxers of all time, and is ranked by BoxRec as the thirteenth greatest boxer of all time and the fifth greatest Mexican boxer of all time, pound for pound. He was inducted into the International Boxing Hall of Fame in the class of 2020.

== Amateur career ==
Márquez had an amateur record of 82–4, with 72 wins by knock-out.

== Professional career ==
=== Featherweight ===
He made his professional boxing debut at age 19 on May 29, 1993, losing via disqualification to Javier Duran. Márquez remained undefeated for six years, compiling a 29–1 record that included wins against future champions Agapito Sanchez, Julio Gervacio and Alfred Kotey. In 1997, Márquez won the WBO NABO Featherweight title, which he defended seven times. During this time, he was referred to as the "best fighter without a world title." Márquez was WBO Featherweight Champion Naseem Hamed's mandatory challenger for 22 straight months. However, the WBO allowed Hamed to schedule other fights instead. During this time, Márquez worked as an accountant while training under Ignacio Beristáin in Mexico City. Márquez would keep this job until winning his first world title in 2004.

==== Márquez vs. Norwood ====
In 1999, Márquez faced Freddie Norwood for the WBA Featherweight title instead. Márquez was knocked down in the second round. In the 8th round, Norwood's glove touched the canvas after an exchange. However, it was not ruled a knock down by the referee who was standing opposite to the action. In the 9th round, Márquez scored a knockdown after a two punch combination. Márquez lost via controversial unanimous decision. HBO Punchstat had Norwood landing 73 out of 290 punches thrown to Márquez's 89 of 444.

On November 20, 1999, Márquez faced Remigio Molina and defeated him in eight rounds. In 2000, he defeated former champion Daniel Jimenez and five fights later, he defeated future champion Robbie Peden in ten rounds and captured the NABF & USBA Featherweight titles.

=== Featherweight champion ===
Márquez received his second bout for a world title on February 1, 2003, when he defeated former four-time Featherweight Champion Manuel Medina and captured the vacant IBF Featherweight title. In the 2nd round, Márquez connected with a three-punch combination that floored Medina. The fight was stopped in the 7th round after Márquez knocked Medina down for a second time.

He then defeated Derrick Gainer later in the year in a unification bout to win the WBA Featherweight title and become the WBA (Super) Champion.

==== Márquez vs. Pacquiao I ====
In May 2004, Márquez fought Lineal & The Ring Featherweight Champion Manny Pacquiao in a bout where Márquez was knocked down three times in the 1st round. Márquez outboxed Pacquiao for the remainder of the bout which was ended in a controversial, split-decision draw. The final scores were 115–110 for Márquez, 115–110 for Pacquiao and 113–113. Judge Burt A. Clements (who scored the bout 113–113) later admitted to making an error on the scorecards, because he had scored the first round as 10–7 in favor of Pacquiao instead of the standard 10–6 for a three-knockdown round.

=== Defending unified titles ===
On September 18, 2004, Márquez made his first appearance on pay-per-view, being on the undercard of Bernard Hopkins vs. Oscar De La Hoya, defeating and retaining his unified titles against future champion Orlando Salido. On May 7, 2005, he made his fourth title defense and first appearance on Showtime Championship Boxing, facing Victor Polo while walking away with a unanimous decision victory. In August 2005, Márquez was stripped of his WBA and IBF unified Featherweight titles for his inability to defend them against various boxers after potential bouts failed to draw a bid.

==== Márquez vs. John ====
In 2006, Márquez attempted to regain a title, coming up short in a unanimous decision loss to undefeated Indonesian boxer Chris John in Indonesia for the WBA Featherweight Championship title. The loss led to the Ring Magazine's removal of Márquez from its pound for pound.

In late 2006, Márquez captured the Interim WBO Featherweight title by defeating Thai boxer Terdsak Jandaeng. He defended it against Filipino boxer Jimrex Jaca with a nine-round knockout in Hidalgo, Texas. Márquez was promoted to world champion status in December 2006 when previous champion Scott Harrison vacated the title. Márquez vacated the Featherweight title the following year to challenge WBC Super Featherweight Champion Marco Antonio Barrera.

=== Super featherweight ===
==== Márquez vs. Barrera ====
On March 17, 2007, Márquez became the WBC Super Featherweight Champion by defeating Barrera in Las Vegas via unanimous decision, by the official scores of 116–111, 116–111 and 118–109. Márquez's first defense of his title was to be held on September 15, 2007, against Argentinian boxer Jorge Rodrigo Barrios. However, Barrios withdrew from the bout due to injury, prompting American boxer Rocky Juárez to challenge Márquez for the title on November 3, 2007, in a losing effort.

==== Márquez vs. Pacquiao II ====
On November 29, 2007, Márquez announced that he would defend his title in a rematch with Pacquiao. On March 15, 2008, Márquez lost his Super Featherweight title to Pacquiao via split decision. Márquez suffered a knockdown in the third round that proved to be the difference, as the remaining rounds were scored dead even. Compubox scoring had Márquez landing 42 of 201 (21%) jabs to Pacquiao's 43 of 314 (14%) and landing 130 of 310 (42%) power punches to Pacquiao's 114 of 305 (37%). Richard Schaefer, Golden Boy Promotions CEO, offered a $6 million guarantee to Pacquiao for a rematch. Pacquiao's promoter, Bob Arum, said, "I'm not saying they'll never fight again, but you have to let it bake for a while." Pacquiao said: "I don't think so, this business is over" as he planned to move up to the lightweight division.

=== Lightweight ===
==== Márquez vs. Casamayor ====
Márquez moved up to the lightweight division in order to fight The Ring Lightweight Champion Joel Casamayor on the weekend leading up to Mexican Independence Day at the MGM Grand, Las Vegas, Nevada. On September 13, 2008, he defeated Casamayor in the 11th round after two knockdowns and captured his sixth world title in three different weight classes. In the first four rounds of the bout, Márquez continually walked into counter punches from Casamayor. It took Márquez until the fifth round to be able to find the range with his right hand. By the fifth round, a cut over Casamayor's right eye was opened from a clash of heads. Rounds five, six, seven and eight were rounds where Márquez landed straight punches from the outside, but he was also struck by Casamayor whenever he lunged forward. Two minutes into the eleventh round, Casamayor was knocked down by a right punch as he pulled away from an intense exchange. Casamayor was able to get on his feet, but it was clear he was still shaken from the knockdown. As soon as the action was allowed to resume, Márquez went in for the kill as he let his punches go in furious combination. Casamayor punched back, but he was knocked down again with about 7 seconds left in the round. Referee Tony Weeks stepped in the bout and stopped the fight as he deemed Casamayor unable to continue. The official judges had the fight scored 95–95, 95–95 and 97–93 for Márquez before the 11th-round knockout. After the win, The Ring ranked Márquez second on its pound for pound list and rated him the number one boxer in the lightweight division.

==== Márquez vs. Diaz I ====
On February 28, 2009, Márquez defeated former WBA, WBO & IBF Lightweight Champion Juan Díaz by knockout. Díaz controlled the fight early in the bout as the two boxers exchanged punches. Díaz opened a cut above Márquez's right eye in the fifth round and looked to control the bout, but Márquez responded by opening a gash above Díaz's right eye and stunning him with a left hook before the end of the eighth round. Márquez landed two hard rights to Díaz's face in a three-punch combination that knocked Díaz down with 35 seconds remaining in the ninth round. Díaz rose, but seconds later, Márquez followed with a right uppercut to the chin that knocked Díaz down for a second time. Referee Rafael Ramos waved an end to the fight after two minutes and 40 seconds of the ninth round. With the victory, Márquez defended his The Ring Lightweight title and claimed the vacant WBO and vacant WBA (Super) Lightweight titles. This bout was named "Fight of the Year" for 2009 by The Ring magazine and ESPN.com. After the fight, Márquez expressed an interest in fighting Floyd Mayweather Jr.

=== Welterweight ===
==== Márquez vs. Mayweather ====
Márquez moved up to the welterweight division and fought undefeated pound for pound champion Floyd Mayweather Jr. The fight was scheduled to take place at 144-pound catch weight on July 18, 2009, at the MGM Grand Garden Arena; but was postponed due to a rib injury sustained by Mayweather. The bout was rescheduled and held on September 19, 2009. During the official weigh in, Márquez weighed in at 142 lbs and Mayweather weighed in at 146 lbs, thereby incurring a financial penalty as he was 2 pounds over the catchweight. It was later discovered that both parties had agreed just before the weigh-in to allow Mayweather fight over the catchweight with Mayweather paying additional $600,000 due to arriving two pounds over the 144 lbs weight limit. Mayweather controlled the action in the fight. Márquez struggled to conquer Mayweather's defense and could not get out of the way of his counter punches. Márquez landed only 19% of his punches according to Compubox punch stats. Mayweather knocked Márquez down in the 2nd round. Mayweather won the fight by unanimous decision.

This was the fifth non-heavyweight fight in boxing history to sell more than one million pay-per-views, with the official HBO numbers totaling about $52 million. It was also the first fight to sell more than one million PPVs without featuring Oscar De La Hoya. Two months later, Manny Pacquiao vs. Miguel Cotto would sell 1.25 million PPVs.

=== Return to Lightweight ===
==== Márquez vs. Diaz II ====
When asked upon his return to the lightweight division, Márquez said: "I came back to lightweight because at welterweight I lost a lot of speed."

Márquez then began negotiations for a rematch with Juan Díaz. Golden Boy CEO Richard Schaefer said the fight for Márquez's title was being planned for July 10 as the main event of an HBO PPV card. He said it would "probably" take place at the MGM Grand in Las Vegas. After his comeback in 2010, fellow Mexican boxer Erik Morales said he would like to fight Márquez. Morales returned two divisions higher in 2010, as a welterweight. However, Márquez has also stated that he would be interested in a fight with Ricky Hatton.

The Márquez-Díaz rematch took place on July 31, 2010, at the Mandalay Bay. Márquez's titles were also at stake. Prior to the bout, the WBO ordered the Márquez-Díaz winner to fight mandatory challenger Michael Katsidis. Márquez won the fight via unanimous decision by the official scores of 117–111, 116–112 and 118–110. After the Díaz rematch, Márquez stated that he was interested in pursuing a third fight with Manny Pacquiao. There was also a possibility of him moving up to light welterweight to face any of the titleholders at the time: Timothy Bradley, Devon Alexander or Amir Khan, all of whom were fighting on HBO.

==== Márquez vs. Katsidis ====
A few weeks after the Juan Díaz fight, Golden Boy Promotions officially announced that Márquez would defend his lightweight titles against mandatory challenger, WBO Interim Champion Michael Katsidis, on November 27, 2010, at the MGM Grand in Las Vegas and that the bout would be televised live on HBO Championship Boxing. During the official weigh in for their 135 lb bout, Márquez came in at 134 pounds, while Katsidis came in on the limit of 135 pounds. Despite being knocked down in the third round, Márquez came back and defeated Katsidis by a ninth-round TKO to retain the lightweight belts. At the time of the stoppage, the Mexican boxer was ahead on all the scorecards by 77–74, 78–74 and 76–75. During the post fight interview, he once again expressed his interest in a third fight with Manny Pacquiao.

Márquez is the oldest world champion in the history of the lightweight division. On January 4, the WBA no longer recognized Márquez as their Super Champion due to going 18 months without fighting a mandatory challenger as required by the organization's rules. Fernando Beltrán of Zanfer Promotions stated that the WBA's decision had no validity and that he would immediately send them a letter, since the deadline of May 2012 for the mandatory defense had not expired, and Márquez paid sanctioning fees to the WBA even for the last few non-lightweight fights. On January 26, Márquez was stripped of his WBO title, as he was considered to be moving up to the welterweight division. The WBO promoted Interim titleholder Ricky Burns to full champion status. The Ring magazine stripped of him of their championship on April 17.

=== Light welterweight ===
Márquez moved up to light welterweight division to fight Likar Ramos on July 16, 2011, at Mexico. It was considered a tune-up fight before his third battle with Manny Pacquiao. The fight only lasted one round with Márquez winning by technical knockout. Many experts queried whether Ramos was hired to 'take a dive' (have the contest fixed or lose it on purpose) in order for Márquez to look good.

=== Return to welterweight ===
==== Márquez vs. Pacquiao III ====
Márquez attracted controversy by hiring strength and conditioning coach Angel "Memo Heredia" Hernandez, who had supplied performance-enhancing drugs to sprinters Marion Jones and Tim Montgomery in 2000.

On November 12, Márquez lost to Pacquiao via controversial majority decision. The decision was voted the "Robbery of the Year," in 2011 by The Ring Magazine readers.

=== Return to light welterweight ===
==== Márquez vs. Fedchenko ====
On April 14, 2012, Márquez defeated Ukrainian contender Serhiy Fedchenko via unanimous decision to capture the interim WBO light welterweight title by a clear margin with scores of 119–109, 118–110, 118–110. The WBO later updated him to full status WBO Champion.

=== Third return to Welterweight ===
==== Márquez vs. Pacquiao IV ====
Márquez fought Manny Pacquiao on December 8, 2012. The fight was for the WBO's "Champion of the Decade" belt. Márquez knocked down Pacquiao in the 3rd round with a looping right hook. In round 5, Pacquiao returned the favor, knocking down Márquez. Pacquiao went on the offensive in the 6th round. While behind the scorecards and with just 1 second left in the 6th round, Márquez countered Pacquiao's jab with an overhand right, sending Pacquiao face first to the canvas, resulting in a knockout. Pacquiao, who had not been knocked out in over 13 years since his loss to Medgeon Singsurat in 1999, remained unconscious for several minutes. This was named The Ring magazine's "Fight of the Year" and "Knockout of the Year" and "International Fight of the Year" by the British website BoxRec. Márquez was also named "International Fighter of the Year" by the same publication.

==== Márquez vs. Bradley ====
Márquez fought Timothy Bradley in a bout billed as 'The Conquerors' for his WBO welterweight title at the Thomas and Mack Center in Las Vegas, Nevada on October 12, 2013. Márquez was looking to win a title in a fifth weight class. The fight went the distance as Márquez lost by split decision (115–113, 113–115, 112–116). CompuBox stats showed Bradley landed 168 punches of 562 thrown while Márquez landed 153 punches of 455 thrown. However, Márquez connected on 115 power punches to Bradley's 86. In the post fight interviews, Bradley said "I gave him a boxing lesson. He couldn't touch me. I had complete control." Márquez replied, "I clearly won. I have been robbed six times in my career. You don't have to knock down the other guy to win the fight." The fight drew 375,000 ppv buys on HBO PPV and 13,111 in attendance drawing a live gate of $2,998,950.

==== Márquez vs. Alvarado ====
On May 17, 2014, at The Forum, in Inglewood, California, Márquez was back in action in a welterweight bout against former WBO Junior Welterweight Champion Mike Alvarado (34–2, 23 KOs) for the WBO International welterweight title. The fight was also a WBO welterweight title eliminator, with the winner to earn a mandatory shot against Manny Pacquiao for the title he regained April 12 against Timothy Bradley in their rematch. Despite the fight being a welterweight eliminator, it was agreed to be fought with a 143-pound maximum. Alvarado weighed in at 143.2 lbs. In a one sided bout, Márquez defeated Alvarado by unanimous decision with the judges scores of 119–108, 117–109, 117–109. Alvarado was down in round eight and Márquez was knocked down in round nine.

=== Inactivity and retirement ===
There were negotiations from January 2016 for a fight between Márquez and former four-weight division champion Miguel Cotto. The main issue between both camps being the weight with Márquez looking to fight at no more than 147lbs and Cotto looking to fight at 155lb catchweight. Miguel Cotto Promotions told ESPN.com that negotiations had broken down on August 2 as both camps could not settle on what weight the fight would be. After nearly three years out, Márquez announced he would be entering camp in January 2017. Márquez revealed he would have a named opponent and date for his next fight by the end of April 2017. Márquez had been training at the Omanza gym. According to trainer Ignacio Beristáin, Márquez was looking to return in Toluca, Mexico on June 24, 2017. It was then pushed back to August 19. Due to venues not being available for that date, Zanfer Promotions said a date in September or October would be more suitable with the venue being in Monterrey.

On August 4, 2017, Márquez announced his retirement from professional boxing after a 21-year career. Márquez spoke to ESPN Deportes TV show Golpe a Golpe, "Today is a special and sad day for me because I'm announcing my retirement. The injuries pushed me to make this decision. It hurts, but I believe the right moment to put an end to my career has arrived. I would have loved to do a final fight to say goodbye inside the ring, but I have to listen to my body, and it was telling me that the right moment to stop boxing is now." He ended his career with a record of 56 wins, 7 losses and 1 draw, with 40 knockouts. Márquez admitted the decision was hard to make, but initially made the decision 10 days prior to announcing it.

== Personal life ==
Márquez was born in Mexico City. He grew up in a rough and poor area of Iztacalco, many of his friends succumbing to gang violence and dying young while he went on to box. Márquez has said that he has always been a good student and that he likes numbers. He studied and became an accountant, and worked for several government agencies. He gave up on his accounting work and focused entirely on his boxing career.

He started practicing boxing at the age of eight inspired by his father's training. He stated that he likes to "eat well" and does not follow any kind of diet. His brother, Rafael Márquez, is a former world champion in the bantamweight and super bantamweight divisions. They both trained under Ignacio Beristáin and assistant Gilbert Márquez. At one time, the two were listed in Ring Magazine's top ten pound-for-pound list. They are one of four sets of Mexican brothers to hold world titles. Márquez and his wife, Erika have two sons and a daughter.

Márquez is a member of the PRI (Institutional Revolutionary Party).

Márquez has been a commentator on the ESPN boxing show Golpe a Golpe since 2011.

Márquez makes an appearance in the 2005 video game Fight Night Round 2.

== Professional boxing record ==
64 fights	56 wins	7 losses
By knockout	40	0
By decision	16	6
By disqualification	0	1
Draws	1	

No.	Result	Record	Opponent	Type	Round, time	Date	Location	Notes
64	Win	56–7–1	Mike Alvarado	UD	12	May 17, 2014	The Forum, Inglewood, California, U.S.	Won WBO International welterweight title
63	Loss	55–7–1	Timothy Bradley	SD	12	Oct 12, 2013	Thomas & Mack Center, Paradise, Nevada, U.S.	For WBO welterweight title
62	Win	55–6–1	Manny Pacquiao	KO	6 (12), 2:59	Dec 8, 2012	MGM Grand Garden Arena, Paradise, Nevada, U.S.	
61	Win	54–6–1	Serhiy Fedchenko	UD	12	Apr 14, 2012	Mexico City Arena, Mexico City, Mexico	Won vacant WBO interim junior welterweight title
60	Loss	53–6–1	Manny Pacquiao	MD	12	Nov 12, 2011	MGM Grand Garden Arena, Paradise, Nevada, U.S.	For WBO welterweight title
59	Win	53–5–1	Likar Ramos Concha	KO	1 (10), 1:46	Jul 16, 2011	Plaza de Toros, Cancún, Mexico	
58	Win	52–5–1	Michael Katsidis	TKO	9 (12), 2:14	Nov 27, 2010	MGM Grand Garden Arena, Paradise, Nevada, U.S.	Retained WBA (Super), WBO, and The Ring lightweight titles
57	Win	51–5–1	Juan Díaz	UD	12	Jul 31, 2010	Mandalay Bay Events Center, Paradise, Nevada, U.S.	Retained WBA (Super), WBO, and The Ring lightweight titles
56	Loss	50–5–1	Floyd Mayweather Jr.	UD	12	Sep 19, 2009	MGM Grand Garden Arena, Paradise, Nevada, U.S.	
55	Win	50–4–1	Juan Díaz	TKO	9 (12), 2:40	Feb 28, 2009	Toyota Center, Houston, Texas, U.S.	Retained The Ring lightweight title; Won vacant WBA (Super) and WBO lightweight titles
54	Win	49–4–1	Joel Casamayor	KO	11 (12), 0:55	Sep 13, 2008	MGM Grand Garden Arena, Paradise, Nevada, U.S.	Won The Ring lightweight title
53	Loss	48–4–1	Manny Pacquiao	SD	12	Mar 15, 2008	Mandalay Bay Events Center, Paradise, Nevada, U.S.	Lost WBC super featherweight title; For vacant The Ring super featherweight title
52	Win	48–3–1	Rocky Juarez	UD	12	Nov 3, 2007	Desert Diamond Casino, Tucson, Arizona, U.S.	Retained WBC super featherweight title
51	Win	47–3–1	Marco Antonio Barrera	UD	12	Mar 17, 2007	Mandalay Bay Events Center, Paradise, Nevada, U.S.	Won WBC super featherweight title
50	Win	46–3–1	Jimrex Jaca	KO	9 (12), 2:48	Nov 25, 2006	Dodge Arena, Hidalgo, Texas, U.S.	Retained WBO interim featherweight title
49	Win	45–3–1	Terdsak Kokietgym	TKO	7 (12), 1:13	Aug 5, 2006	MontBleu, Stateline, Nevada, U.S.	Won WBO interim featherweight title
48	Loss	44–3–1	Chris John	UD	12	Mar 4, 2006	Karang Melenu Sports Hall, Kutai Kartanegara, Indonesia	For WBA featherweight title
47	Win	44–2–1	Victor Polo	UD	12	May 7, 2005	Mandalay Bay Events Center, Paradise, Nevada, U.S.	Retained WBA (Unified) and IBF featherweight titles
46	Win	43–2–1	Orlando Salido	UD	12	Sep 18, 2004	MGM Grand Garden Arena, Paradise, Nevada, U.S.	Retained WBA (Unified) and IBF featherweight titles
45	Draw	42–2–1	Manny Pacquiao	SD	12	May 8, 2004	MGM Grand Garden Arena, Paradise, Nevada, U.S.	Retained WBA (Unified) and IBF featherweight titles; For The Ring featherweight title
44	Win	42–2	Derrick Gainer	TD	7 (12), 2:37	Nov 1, 2003	Van Andel Arena, Grand Rapids, Michigan, U.S.	Retained IBF featherweight title; Won WBA (Unified) featherweight title; Unanimous TD: Gainer cut from an accidental head clash
43	Win	41–2	Marcos Licona	TKO	9 (10), 3:00	Aug 16, 2003	Mohegan Sun Arena, Montville, Connecticut, U.S.	
42	Win	40–2	Manuel Medina	TKO	7 (12), 1:18	Feb 1, 2003	Mandalay Bay Events Center, Paradise, Nevada, U.S.	Won vacant IBF featherweight title
41	Win	39–2	Hector Javier Márquez	TKO	10 (10), 0:28	Jun 21, 2002	The Orleans, Paradise, Nevada, U.S.	
40	Win	38–2	Robbie Peden	RTD	10 (12), 3:00	Mar 9, 2002	Palumbo Center, Pittsburgh, Pennsylvania, U.S.	Won NABF and vacant USBA featherweight titles
39	Win	37–2	Johnny Walker	TKO	1 (10), 0:56	Oct 19, 2001	Coeur d'Alene Casino Resort Hotel, Worley, Idaho, U.S.	
38	Win	36–2	Julio Gamboa	TKO	7 (10), 3:00	Aug 19, 2001	Stateline Casino, Wendover, Utah, U.S.	
37	Win	35–2	Baby Lorona Jr.	TKO	2 (10), 2:50	Apr 1, 2001	Peppermill, Reno, Nevada, U.S.	
36	Win	34–2	Sean Fletcher	TKO	7 (10), 1:54	Feb 11, 2001	Peppermill, Reno, Nevada, U.S.	
35	Win	33–2	Reynante Jamili	KO	3 (10), 1:14	Oct 22, 2000	Peppermill, Reno, Nevada, U.S.	
34	Win	32–2	Daniel Jiménez	RTD	7 (10), 3:00	Aug 27, 2000	Plaza Hotel & Casino, Las Vegas, Nevada, U.S.	
33	Win	31–2	Roque Cassiani	UD	12	May 20, 2000	Caesars Tahoe, Stateline, Nevada, U.S.	Won vacant NABO featherweight title
32	Win	30–2	Remigio Molina	TKO	8 (10), 2:01	Nov 20, 1999	The Joint, Paradise, Nevada, U.S.	
31	Loss	29–2	Freddie Norwood	UD	12	Sep 11, 1999	Mandalay Bay Events Center, Paradise, Nevada, U.S.	For WBA featherweight title
30	Win	29–1	Wilfredo Vargas	KO	2 (10), 2:02	May 10, 1999	Great Western Forum, Inglewood, California, U.S.	
29	Win	28–1	Jose de Jesus Garcia	KO	1 (10), 1:54	Feb 20, 1999	Spotlight 29 Casino, Coachella, California, U.S.	
28	Win	27–1	Francisco Arreola	TKO	3 (12), 2:24	Oct 24, 1998	Tropicana, Paradise, Nevada, U.S.	Retained NABO featherweight title
27	Win	26–1	Enrique Jupiter	TKO	8 (12), 1:09	Aug 22, 1998	Tropicana, Paradise, Nevada, U.S.	Retained NABO featherweight title
26	Win	25–1	Juan Gerardo Cabrera	TKO	4 (12), 3:00	Apr 20, 1998	Tropicana, Paradise, Nevada, U.S.	Retained NABO featherweight title
25	Win	24–1	Luis Samudio	TKO	9 (10), 2:18	Mar 16, 1998	Great Western Forum, Inglewood, California, U.S.	
24	Win	23–1	Alfred Kotey	UD	12	Nov 22, 1997	Tropicana Las Vegas, Paradise, Nevada, U.S.	Retained NABO featherweight title
23	Win	22–1	Vincent Howard	TKO	12	Sep 27, 1997	Caesars Tahoe, Stateline, Nevada, U.S.	Retained NABO featherweight title
22	Win	21–1	Catalino Becerra	TKO	7 (12), 1:37	Jul 14, 1997	Great Western Forum, Inglewood, California, U.S.	Retained NABO featherweight title
21	Win	20–1	Agapito Sánchez	UD	12	Apr 21, 1997	Great Western Forum, Inglewood, California, U.S.	Retained NABO featherweight title
20	Win	19–1	Cedric Mingo	RTD	10 (12), 3:00	Feb 3, 1997	Arrowhead Pond, Anaheim, California, U.S.	Won vacant NABO featherweight title
19	Win	18–1	Rodrigo Valenzuela	KO	8 (10), 3:00	Dec 9, 1996	Great Western Forum, Inglewood, California, U.S.	
18	Win	17–1	Darryl Pinckney	UD	10	Oct 19, 1996	Caesars Tahoe, Stateline, Nevada, U.S.	
17	Win	16–1	Freddy Cruz	UD	10	Jul 8, 1996	Great Western Forum, Inglewood, California, U.S.	
16	Win	15–1	Julio Gervacio	KO	8 (10), 0:35	Apr 29, 1996	Arrowhead Pond, Anaheim, California, U.S.	
15	Win	14–1	Hector Ulises Chong	KO	4 (10), 1:42	Mar 4, 1996	Great Western Forum, Inglewood, California, U.S.	
14	Win	13–1	Julian Wheeler	TKO	10 (10), 2:55	Nov 6, 1995	Great Western Forum, Inglewood, California, U.S.	
13	Win	12–1	Miguel Rodriguez	TKO	1 (10), 2:30	Sep 25, 1995	Great Western Forum, Inglewood, California, U.S.	
12	Win	11–1	Julio Cesar Portillo	KO	6 (10), 2:10	Jul 10, 1995	Great Western Forum, Inglewood, California, U.S.	
11	Win	10–1	Julio Sanchez Leon	UD	10	Apr 24, 1995	Great Western Forum, Inglewood, California, U.S.	
10	Win	9–1	Martin Ochoa	TKO	1	Jan 30, 1995	Great Western Forum, Inglewood, California, U.S.	
9	Win	8–1	Israel Gonzalez	TKO	4 (8), 0:34	Dec 3, 1994	Caesars Palace, Paradise, Nevada, U.S.	
8	Win	7–1	Jose Luis Montes	KO	2	Nov 12, 1994	Plaza de Toros, Mexico City, Mexico	
7	Win	6–1	Israel Flores	UD	4	Oct 1, 1994	Mexico City, Mexico	
6	Win	5–1	Gregorio Silva	TKO	2	Aug 27, 1994	Mexico City, Mexico	
5	Win	4–1	Roman Poblano	UD	6	May 7, 1994	Mexico City, Mexico	
4	Win	3–1	Isaac Cortes	TKO	5 (6)	Oct 1, 1993	Mexico City, Mexico	
3	Win	2–1	Israel Flores	TKO	2	Sep 18, 1993	Mexico City, Mexico	
2	Win	1–1	Javier Quiroz	TKO	3	Jun 26, 1993	Mexico City, Mexico	
1	Loss	0–1	Javier Duran	DQ	1	May 29, 1993	Mexico City, Mexico	

== Titles in boxing ==
=== Major world titles ===
- WBA (Unified) featherweight champion (126 lbs)
- IBF featherweight champion (126 lbs)
- WBC super featherweight champion (130 lbs)
- WBA (Super) lightweight champion (135 lbs)
- WBO lightweight champion (135 lbs)
- WBO junior welterweight champion (140 lbs)

=== The Ring magazine titles ===
- The Ring lightweight champion (135 lbs)

=== Interim world titles ===
- WBO interim featherweight champion (126 lbs)
- WBO interim junior welterweight champion (140 lbs)

=== Regional/International titles ===
- NABO featherweight champion (126 lbs) (2×)
- NABF featherweight champion (126 lbs)
- USBA featherweight champion (126 lbs)
- WBO International welterweight champion (147 lbs)

=== Honorary titles ===
- WBO Super Champion
- WBO Champion of the Decade

== Pay-per-view bouts ==
Date	Fight	Billing	Buys	Network
Mar 17, 2007	Juan Manuel Márquez vs. Marco Antonio Barerra	Fearless	225,000	HBO
Mar 15, 2008	Juan Manuel Márquez vs. Manny Pacquiao II	Unfinished Business	400,000	HBO
Sep 13, 2008	Juan Manuel Márquez vs. Joel Casamayor	The Challenge	100,000	HBO
Sep 19, 2009	Juan Manuel Márquez vs. Floyd Mayweather	Number One/Número Uno	1,100,000	HBO
Jul 31, 2010	Juan Manuel Márquez vs. Juan Diaz II	Fight of the Year: The Rematch	200,000	HBO
Nov 11, 2011	Juan Manuel Márquez vs. Manny Pacquiao III	The 25th Round Begins	1,400,000	HBO
Dec 8, 2012	Juan Manuel Márquez vs. Manny Pacquiao IV	Fight of the Decade	1,150,000	HBO
Oct 12, 2013	Juan Manuel Márquez vs. Timothy Bradley	The Conquerors	375,000	HBO

== See also ==
- List of featherweight boxing champions
- List of super-featherweight boxing champions
- List of lightweight boxing champions
- List of light-welterweight boxing champions
- List of boxing quadruple champions
- List of Mexican boxing world champions
- Notable boxing families

Sporting positions
Regional boxing titles
Vacant Title last held by Miguel Angel Escamilla	NABO featherweight champion February 3, 1997 – February 1999; Vacated	Vacant Title next held by Daniel Seda
Preceded by Robbie Peden	NABF featherweight champion March 9, 2002 – June 2002; Vacated	Vacant Title next held by Hector Javier Marquez
Vacant Title last held by Angel Vazquez	USBA featherweight champion March 9, 2002 – June 2002; Vacated	Vacant Title next held by Rogers Mtagwa
Vacant Title last held by Manny Pacquiao	WBO International welterweight champion May 17, 2014 – January 2015; Vacated	Vacant Title next held by Brandon Ríos
World boxing titles
Vacant Title last held by Johnny Tapia	IBF featherweight champion February 1, 2003 – August 16, 2005; Stripped	Vacant Title next held by Valdemir Pereira
New title Unified against Derrick Gainer	WBA featherweight champion Unified title November 1, 2003 – August 22, 2005; Stripped	Vacant Title next held by Yuriorkis Gamboa
Vacant Title last held by Scott Harrison	WBO featherweight champion Interim title August 5, 2006 – December 6, 2006; Promoted	Vacant Title next held by Carl Frampton
Preceded by Scott Harrison stripped	WBO featherweight champion December 6, 2006 – April 3, 2007; Vacated	Vacant Title next held by Steven Luevano
Preceded by Marco Antonio Barrera	WBC super featherweight champion March 17, 2007 – March 15, 2008	Succeeded by Manny Pacquiao
Preceded by Joel Casamayor	The Ring lightweight champion September 13, 2008 – April 23, 2012; Vacated	Vacant Title next held by Terence Crawford
Vacant Title last held by Nate Campbell	WBA lightweight champion Super title February 28, 2009 – January 4, 2012; Stripped	Vacant Title next held by Vasyl Lomachenko
Vacant Title last held by Nate Campbell	WBO lightweight champion February 28, 2009 – January 26, 2012; Stripped	Succeeded by Ricky Burns
Vacant Title last held by Lamont Peterson	WBO junior welterweight champion Interim title April 14, 2012 – June 27, 2012; Promoted	Vacant Title next held by Mike Alvarado
Vacant Title last held by Timothy Bradley	WBO junior welterweight champion June 27, 2012 – October 12, 2013; Vacated	Succeeded by Mike Alvarado
Awards
Previous: Israel Vázquez vs. Rafael Márquez III	The Ring Fight of the Year vs. Juan Díaz; 2009	Next: Giovani Segura vs. Iván Calderón
Inaugural award	HBO Fight of the Year vs. Michael Katsidis; 2010	Next: Andre Berto vs. Victor Ortiz
Previous: Manny Pacquiao	The Ring Fighter of the Year; 2012	Next: Adonis Stevenson
Previous: Andre Berto vs. Victor Ortiz	The Ring Fight of the Year vs. Manny Pacquiao IV; 2012	Next: Timothy Bradley vs. Ruslan Provodnikov
Previous: Nonito Donaire; KO2 Fernando Montiel	The Ring Knockout of the Year; KO6 Manny Pacquiao IV; 2012	Next: Adonis Stevenson; TKO1 Chad Dawson
Previous: Nonito Donaire; KO2 Fernando Montiel	ESPN Knockout of the Year; KO6 Manny Pacquiao IV; 2012	Next: Adonis Stevenson; TKO1 Chad Dawson
