= Gamalier Rodríguez =

Puerto Rican boxer

Gamalier "Baby Bird" Rodríguez (Born December 3, 1986 in Bayamón, Puerto Rico) is a Puerto Rican professional boxer. Rodriguez won the World Boxing Organization North American Boxing Organization featherweight title when he defeated Alicio Castaneda. Rodriguez had multiple defenses of this title, including one over Orlando Cruz.

Rodríguez fought Vasiliy Lomachenko for the WBO featherweight world title in 2015; he was knocked out 50 seconds into the 9th round.
