= Manny Pacquiao vs. Juan Manuel Márquez IV =

Boxing match

Fight of the Decade
- Date: December 8, 2012
- Venue: MGM Grand Garden Arena Paradise, Nevada, U.S.

Tale of the tape
Boxer	Manny Pacquiao	Juan Manuel Márquez
Nickname	Pac-Man	Dinamita ("Dynamite")
Hometown	General Santos, South Cotabato, Philippines	Iztacalco, Mexico City, Mexico
Purse	$26,000,000	$6,000,000
Pre-fight record	54–4–2 (38 KO)	54–6–1 (39 KO)
Age	33 years, 11 months	39 years, 3 months
Height	5 ft 6 1/2 in (169 cm)	5 ft 7 in (170 cm)
Weight	147 lb (67 kg)	143 lb (65 kg)
Style	Southpaw	Orthodox
Recognition	WBO/The Ring; No. 1 Ranked Welterweight; TBRB; No. 2 Ranked Welterweight; The Ring No. 2 ranked pound-for-pound fighter 8-division world champion	WBO; Light Welterweight Champion; The Ring; No. 4 Ranked Light Welterweight; TBRB; No. 7 Ranked Light Welterweight; The Ring No. 6 ranked pound-for-pound fighter 3-division world champion

Result
- Márquez wins via 6th-round KO

Manny Pacquiao vs. Juan Manuel Márquez IV, billed as Fight of the Decade, was a professional boxing match contested on December 8, 2012 at the MGM Grand in Las Vegas, Nevada. This was the fourth and final meeting between Pacquiao and Márquez.

Márquez defeated Pacquiao by knockout with one second remaining in the sixth round. It was named Fight of the Year and Knockout of the Year by Ring Magazine.

== Background ==
Each of the previous three fights between these boxers ended in controversy. While Pacquiao knocked Márquez down three times in the opening round of their first fight, many ringside observers believed Márquez won a large enough balance of the following eleven rounds to earn the decision. Sources of further controversy included one judge scoring round one 10–7 for Pacquiao (as opposed to the customary 10–6 for a three knockdown round) and the widely divergent scores of the other two judges who scored the fight 115–110 Pacquiao and 115–110 Márquez respectively.

The scoring controversy would continue into the second and third fights, both of which Pacquiao won. Márquez and his supporters cried foul following both bouts, citing Pacquiao's come-forward style opposed to Márquez's counterpunching style, as well as the Filipino senator's standing in the sport and powerful promoter Bob Arum as reasons for him getting the nod from the judges. The majority decision following the third fight in particular was booed loudly by the Las Vegas crowd.

HBO's 24/7 was broadcast on CNN in addition to HBO. Pacquiao-Márquez III was promoted during the Major League Baseball playoffs on TBS. A four-city press tour covering an estimated 25,000 miles across three countries started on September 3 in Pacquiao's adopted hometown of Manila, and ended on September 8 in Mexico City. The bout marked the second time Márquez jumped from Lightweight to Welterweight. His first attempt was a September 2009 loss to Floyd Mayweather Jr., who was making his return to boxing.

The winner of this bout would win a commemorative belt by the WBO known as "Champion of the Decade."

=== Reported fight earnings ===
Pacquiao was guaranteed $26 million and Márquez $6 million, plus a share of the profits from a pay-per-view that exceeded one million buys.

== The fight ==
The first two rounds were tentative, with neither fighter landing anything significant aside from a Pacquiao right hook to close the first stanza. Most ringside observers scored both for Pacquiao on account of his cleaner punches and head movement that prevented Márquez from landing his counters. In the third round, Márquez landed several left hooks to the body from range, attempting to halt Pacquiao's movement. The strategy paid off immediately as Márquez feinted again to the body before landing a looping overhand right that floored Pacquiao for the first time in their four fights. Pacquiao rose, but was reluctant to engage for the remainder of the round. Freddie Roach admonished his fighter between rounds to go under the overhand right, rather than pull away, as he appeared to retreat from the knockdown punch.

Pacquiao entered the fourth recovered from the knockdown, but spent most of the round looking for spots, with little success. Márquez however landed several signature right hand counters, securing him the round on each judge's scorecard. Round five opened with Pacquiao landing several hard left hands in the early going before breaking through and flooring Márquez with a straight left hand. Márquez arose and answered with a massive straight right on the chin that wobbled his rival. In the final minute of the round, the fighters traded before Pacquiao landed several unanswered punches, including a right hook that buckled Márquez's knees and broke his nose. A bloodied Márquez retreated for the remainder of the round as referee Kenny Bayless looked on closely.

Pacquiao picked up where he left off in the sixth, tagging Márquez consistently. With ten seconds remaining, Pacquiao landed a left cross causing Márquez to wildly push him into the ropes. Positioning shifted, and Pacquiao had Márquez backing into the ropes as he regained his balance. Pacquiao double feinted a jab, presumably setting up his infamous jab-jab-straight left combo, but Márquez ducked under the second jab, and unloaded a right hand to Pacquiao's mouth. Pacquiao's head snapped back violently, as he fell face first to the canvas. An aerial replay of this shocking moment shows Pacquiao's lead foot becoming entangled with the lead foot of Marquez, causing Pacquiao to lose balance split seconds before his rival landed the devastating blow.

Ringside HBO commentator Roy Jones shouted over broadcast partner Jim Lampley, "He's not getting up, Jim! He's not getting up, Jim! He's not getting up!" Lampley's reply: "No, he's been knocked out!"

Márquez darted across the ring, right hand raised, before mounting the corner ropes and being mobbed by his trainer Ignacio Beristáin and promoter Fernando Beltran among others. Kenny Bayless didn't bother to count as Pacquiao lay on the canvas motionless until he was revived and sat on his stool, two minutes, twenty seconds after going down.

== Aftermath ==
In the immediate aftermath, both fighters praised their opponent, with Pacquiao acknowledging that he "had no excuse and that he (Márquez) deserved the victory." Márquez called Pacquiao a "great fighter" after the fight, saying "I landed the perfect punch" and that "I knew he (Pacquiao) could knock me out at any moment." The bout would draw 1.15 million pay-per-view buys.

=== Repercussions ===
With the fight ending in a knockout, commentators speculated that Pacquiao could retire to focus on his congressional career. Pacquiao indicated a willingness to fight and said he would want a fifth fight with Márquez if it was offered to him. Pacquiao has since fought and rebounded by beating Brandon Rios, Timothy Bradley and Chris Algieri. Márquez lost his opportunity to retire on a high note after losing his next fight to Timothy Bradley, but he then made up for it by defeating Mike Alvarado and retaining the WBO International Welterweight crown.

== Undercard ==
Confirmed bouts:

== International Broadcasting ==
Country	Broadcaster
Australia	Main Event
Denmark	TV 2 Sport
Hungary	Sport 1
Latin America	Golden
Mexico	TV Azteca
Philippines	GMA Network (delayed), Solar Sports
Poland	Polsat Sport
United Kingdom	Primetime
United States	HBO PPV

Preceded by vs. Timothy Bradley	Manny Pacquiao's bouts 8 December 2012	Succeeded by vs. Brandon Ríos
Preceded by vs. Serhiy Fedchenko	Juan Manuel Márquez's bouts 8 December 2012	Succeeded by vs. Timothy Bradley
Awards
Previous: Andre Berto vs. Victor Ortiz	The Ring Fight of the Year; 2012	Next: Timothy Bradley vs. Ruslan Provodnikov
Previous: Pawel Wolak vs. Delvin Rodríguez	Ali–Frazier Award; 2012	Next: Timothy Bradley vs. Ruslan Provodnikov
Previous: Fernando Montiel vs. Nonito Donaire	The Ring Knockout of the Year; 2012	Next: Chad Dawson vs. Adonis Stevenson
