= Juan Manuel Márquez vs. Manny Pacquiao II =

Boxing match

Unfinished Business
- Date: March 15, 2008
- Venue: Mandalay Bay Events Center, Paradise, Nevada, U.S.
- Title(s) on the line: WBC and vacant The Ring super featherweight titles

Tale of the tape
Boxer	Juan Manuel Márquez	Manny Pacquiao
Nickname	Dinamita ("Dynamite")	"Pac-Man"
Hometown	Mexico City, Mexico	General Santos, Soccsksargen, Philippines
Purse	$1,500,000	$3,000,000
Pre-fight record	48–3–1 (35 KO)	45–3–2 (35 KO)
Age	34 years, 6 months	29 years, 2 months
Height	5 ft 7 in (170 cm)	5 ft 6 1/2 in (169 cm)
Weight	130 lb (59 kg)	129 lb (59 kg)
Style	Orthodox	Southpaw
Recognition	WBC; Super Featherweight Champion; The Ring; No. 2 Ranked Super Featherweight; The Ring No. 3 ranked pound-for-pound fighter 2-division world champion	WBC/WBO/The Ring; No. 1 Ranked Super Featherweight; WBA; No. 2 Ranked Super Featherweight; WBC International super featherweight champion The Ring No. 2 ranked pound-for-pound fighter 3-division world champion

Result
- Pacquiao wins via 12-round split decision (115-112, 112-115, 113-114)

Juan Manuel Márquez vs. Manny Pacquiao II, billed as Unfinished Business, was a professional boxing match contested on March 15, 2008, for the WBC Super featherweight championship.

== Background ==
The bout took place at the Mandalay Bay, Las Vegas, Nevada, United States and was distributed by HBO PPV. The fight is second of the Pacquiao-Márquez tetralogy.

The WBC Super Featherweight title was on the line, and it was the second defense by Marquez. The vacant Ring Magazine Junior Lightweight Title was also up for grabs. While this was Pacquiao's first world title bout since his December 2004 victory over Thai boxer Narongrit Pirang.

== The fight ==
Pacquiao defeated Márquez via split decision, knocking down Márquez once in the third round. Two of the judges scored 115-112 and 114-113 for Pacquiao, while the third judge scored 115-112 in favor of Márquez.

According to CompuBox, Marquez landed with 172 of 511 shots (34%), compared to 157 of 619 for Pacquiao (25%). These numbers reflect how close and tactical the fight was throughout the whole bout.

== Aftermath ==
After the fight, Pacquiao admittedly considered this fight as his most difficult fight since their first match in 2004.

With the victory, Pacquiao became the first Asian boxer to win world titles in four different weight classes.

== Scorecards ==
=== Main event official scorecard ===
Nevada State Athletic Commission Official score card
Title: WBC Super Featherweight					Referee: Kenny Bayless					Supervisor: none				
Date: March 15, 2008					Venue: Mandalay Bay Resort & Casino, Las Vegas, Nevada, U.S.					Promoter: Top Rank				
Marquez		vs.	Pacquiao		Marquez		vs.	Pacquiao		Marquez		vs.	Pacquiao	
RS	TS	Rd	TS	RS	RS	TS	Rd	TS	RS	RS	TS	Rd	TS	RS
9		1		10	9		1		10	9		1		10
10	19	2	19	9	10	19	2	19	9	10	19	2	19	9
8	27	3	29	10	8	27	3	29	10	8	27	3	29	10
9	36	4	39	10	9	39	4	39	10	9	39	4	39	10
10	46	5	48	9	10	46	5	48	9	10	46	5	48	9
10	56	6	57	9	9	55	6	58	10	9	55	6	58	10
10	66	7	66	9	10	65	7	67	9	10	65	7	67	9
10	76	8	75	9	10	75	8	76	9	10	75	8	76	9
10	88	9	84	9	9	86	9	86	10	9	85	9	86	10
9	95	10	94	10	9	93	10	96	10	9	93	10	96	10
10	105	11	103	9	10	103	11	105	9	10	103	11	105	9
10	115	12	112	9	9	112	12	115	10	10	113	12	114	9
FINAL SCORE	115	–	112	FINAL SCORE	FINAL SCORE	112	–	115	FINAL SCORE	FINAL SCORE	113	–	114	FINAL SCORE
Won			Lost		Lost			Won		Lost			Won	
Judge: Jerry Roth					Judge: Duane Ford					Judge: Tom Miller				
Suspensions: none					Point deductions: none					Decision: Pacquiao won via split decision				

== Undercard ==
Confirmed bouts:

== Broadcasting ==
Country	Broadcaster
Australia	Main Event
Canada	Viewers Choice
Ireland & United Kingdom	Setanta Sport
United States	HBO

Preceded by vs. Rocky Juarez	Juan Manuel Márquez's bouts 15 March 2008	Succeeded by vs. Joel Casamayor
Preceded by vs. Marco Antonio Barrera II	Manny Pacquiao's bouts 15 March 2008	Succeeded by vs. David Diaz
