= HBO Boxing (video game) =

2000 video game

- Developer: Osiris Studios
- Publisher: Acclaim Entertainment (Note: Released under the Acclaim Sports label)
- Platform: PlayStation
- Release: NA: November 21, 2000; EU: February 16, 2001
- Genres: Sports, fighting
- Modes: Single-player, multiplayer

HBO Boxing is a video game developed by Osiris Studios and published by Acclaim Entertainment under its Acclaim Sports label for the PlayStation in 2000.

== Reception ==
Reception

Aggregate score
Aggregator	Score
Metacritic	26/100

Review scores
Publication	Score
AllGame	2.5/5
CNET Gamecenter	1/10
Electronic Gaming Monthly	4.5/10
EP Daily	8.5/10
Game Informer	3/10
GameSpot	2.7/10
IGN	3/10
Next Generation	2/5
Official U.S. PlayStation Magazine	2/5
PlayStation: The Official Magazine	5/10

The game received "generally unfavorable reviews" according to the review aggregation website Metacritic. Rob Smolka of NextGen said, "With a bit of control-tweaking and a complete graphics overhaul, this may show some promise in the future incarnations. For now it's just an also-ran." The Electric Playground gave it a favorable review, a few weeks before it was released Stateside.
