= Orlando Cruz =

Puerto Rican boxer

Personal information
- Nickname: El Fenómeno ("The Phenomenon") "El Olimpico" ("The Olympian")
- Nationality: Puerto Rican
- Born: July 1, 1981 (age 45) Yabucoa, Puerto Rico
- Height: 5 ft 4 in (1.63 m)
- Weight: Lightweight

Boxing career
- Stance: Southpaw

Boxing record
- Total fights: 34
- Wins: 25
- Win by KO: 13
- Losses: 7
- Draws: 2

Orlando Cruz (born July 1, 1981) is a retired Puerto Rican professional boxer. As an amateur, he represented Puerto Rico at the 2000 Olympic Games in Australia.

== Biography ==
On October 4, 2012, Cruz officially came out in an interview with Jessi Losada from Telemundo. Scholars who studied his coming-out interviews, describe how Cruz’s coming-out process was influenced by factors like homophobia and toxic masculinity as he navigated his masculinity and sexuality in the media. In doing so, he became the first boxer to come out as gay while still active professionally, stating that "I have and will always be a proud Puerto Rican. I have always been and always will be a proud gay man". He won his first fight since coming out on October 20, 2012. He was among the first class of inductees into the National Gay and Lesbian Sports Hall of Fame on August 2, 2013.

Puerto Rican Boxing Commissioner Dommys Delgado Berty was one of the first to give Orlando encouragement publicly, stating that: "Orlando has proven an excellent boxer with very good chances of becoming a world champion. We do know that it (boxing) is a very macho sport. (To) Those who don;t want to fight with him, well, don;t fight (him)".

In July 2016, Orlando Cruz dedicated his match with Alejandro Valdez to the gay citizens murdered at the Pulse nightclub shooting in Florida. Nearly half the victims were Puerto Rican, and Cruz lost four friends in this tragedy. At the weigh-in for the match, Cruz proudly wore a pair of rainbow-striped briefs, and the bell tolled once for each of the forty-nine victims killed in the shooting. In the match, Cruz knocked out Valdez in seven rounds.

In an interview with El Vocero, Cruz claimed that he did not plan on retiring anytime soon and told Puerto Rican paper editors about his plans to continue making history. “At 35-years-old—I feel great. I know my opponent will come to fight but I am prepared and ready for victory and then to be crowned world champion. I’m focused on becoming the only gay world champion in boxing history."

Cruz wanted to become the first openly gay world boxing champion, and stated so in multiple interviews. He claimed the WBO North American Boxing Organization super featherweight title, but during the eighth round of World Boxing Organization (WBO) World Lightweight championship match in November 2016, he lost to the undefeated Terry Flanagan. After the fight, UK trainer Peter Fury (who at the time was the trainer of his nephew Tyson Fury) stated in a now-deleted tweet “That’s the difference between real men & half of something else.” Later, after being criticised for his comment, he tweeted “Don't worry about my position. Fighting men I want to see. Not something else! #BOXING” (7:08 PM November 26, 2016). Cruz offered Fury no response, instead tweeting “gracias por tu trato, apoyo y respeto dios te bendiga, de eso se trata caemos nos levantamos con más fuerza” (translation: “thank you for your treatment, support and respect god bless you, that's what it's about we fall we get up stronger”) on November 28, 2016 1:36 PM. Despite this match and its resulting homophobia, the Puerto Rican boxer remains an active LGBTQ fighter.

At the LGBT Ricans Conference at Hunter College, Orlando Cruz revealed the emotional pain he endured when he came out to his father as a teenager. His mother was supportive immediately, but his father was supposedly disgusted and refused to speak with him for a year. After years of tension, his father supposedly regretted his actions, and the Puerto Rican boxer now refers to his father as not only his father but also his best friend. Both his mother and father attended Cruz’s wedding to his partner, Jose Manuel Colon, in Central Park in 2013.

In 2017, Cruz was featured as part of a campaign launched by Lululemon (an athletic apparel company) exploring masculinity and strength through a series of short videos. The ad campaign, titled ‘Strength to Be’, aimed to challenge traditional stereotypes of masculinity by featuring five men touching upon what masculinity and what it means for them. Cruz’s video features him talking about coming out while still being a professional boxer.

During Summer 2018, he was honored as Grand Marshall for the Chicago Pride Parade and “Cacique King” for the People’s Puerto Rican Parade.

== Career ==
Cruz made his professional debut on December 15, 2000, against Alfredo Valdez in Puerto Rico. He was undefeated until 2009, when he lost to Cornelius Lock by TKO. In 2018, Cruz was ranked at No. 4 among featherweights by the World Boxing Organization (WBO).

He has been described by ESPN as having "quick hands and feet" and "moves well and punches in flashy combinations."

== Professional record ==
25 Wins (12 Knockouts), 7 Defeats (3 Knockouts), 2 Draws
| Res. | Record | Opponent | Type | Rd., Time | Date | Location | Notes |
| Draw | 25–6–2 | (United States) Lamont Roach Jr. | SD | 12 | 2018-04-20 | José Miguel Agrelot Coliseum, San Juan, Puerto Rico | |
| Loss | 25–6–1 | (Puerto Rico) José López | UD | 12 | 2017-06-11 | Roger Mendoza Coliseum, Caguas, Puerto Rico | WBO International super featherweight title |
| Loss | 25–5–1 | (United Kingdom) Terry Flanagan | TKO | 8 (12), :43 | 2016-11-26 | (United Kingdom) Motorpoint Arena, Cardiff | For WBO Lightweight title |
| Win | 25–4–1 | (Mexico) Gabino Cota | TKO | 7 (10), 2:38 | 2016-10-07 | (United States) A La Carte Event Pavilion, Tampa, Florida | For WBO NABO Super Featherweight title |
| Win | 24–4–1 | (Mexico) Alejandro Valdez | KO | 7 (10), 1:24 | 2016-07-15 | (United States) Civic Center, Kissimmee, Florida | For WBO NABO Super Featherweight title |
| Win | 23–4–1 | (Mexico) Romulo Koasicha | UD | 10 | 2016-03-04 | (United States) A La Carte Event Pavilion, Tampa, Florida | For WBO NABO Super Featherweight title |
| Win | 22–4–1 | (Mexico) Gabino Cota | UD | 10 | 2015-10-09 | (United States) Civic Center, Kissimmee, Florida | For vacant WBO Latino Super Featherweight title. |
| Win | 21–4–1 | (Puerto Rico) Edwin Lopez | TKO | 4 (8), 1:50 | 2015-06-27 | Palacio de los Deportes, Mayaguez, Puerto Rico | |
| Loss | 20–4–1 | (Puerto Rico) Gamalier Rodriguez | UD | 10 | 2014-04-19 | (United States) Bahia Shrine Temple, Orlando, Florida | |
| Loss | 20–3–1 | (Mexico) Orlando Salido | TKO | 7 (12), 1:05 | 2013-10-12 | (United States) Thomas & Mack Center, Las Vegas, Nevada | For vacant WBO Featherweight title. |
| Win | 20–2–1 | (Mexico) Aalan Martinez | TKO | 6 (12), 1:19 | 2013-03-15 | (United States) Civic Center, Kissimmee, Florida | |
| Win | 19–2–1 | (Mexico) Jorge Pazos | UD | 12 | 2012-10-19 | (United States) Civic Center, Kissimmee, Florida | |
| Win | 18–2–1 | (Mexico) Alejandro Delgado | KO | 11 (12), 2:59 | 2012-02-10 | (United States) Community Center, Palm Bay, Florida | |
| Win | 17–2–1 | (United States) Michael Franco | KO | 1 (12), 2:29 | 2011-10-14 | (United States) Civic Center, Kissimmee, Florida | |
| Loss | 16–2–1 | (Mexico) Daniel Ponce de León | KO | 3 (12), 2:37 | 2010-02-20 | Auditorio Plaza Condesa, Mexico City, Mexico | For WBC Latino Featherweight title |
| Loss | 16–1–1 | (United States) Cornelius Lock | TKO | 5 (10), 2:08 | 2009-09-19 | (United States) MGM Grand, Las Vegas, Nevada | For WBO NABO Featherweight title |
| Win | 16–0–1 | (Mexico) Leonilo Miranda | KO | 5 (10), 0:45 | 2009-01-16 | (United States) Million Dollar Elm Casino, Tulsa, Oklahoma | |
| Win | 15–0–1 | (Nicaragua) Carlos Guevara | UD | 12 | 2008-03-22 | (Puerto Rico) Coliseo José Miguel Agrelot, Hato Rey | Won IBA Featherweight title |
| Win | 14–0–1 | (Nicaragua) Wilfredo Acuna | UD | 10 | 2007-11-17 | (Puerto Rico) Mario Morales Coliseum, Guaynabo | |
| Draw | 13–0–1 | (Colombia) Jesús Salvador Pérez | SD | 4 | 2007-06-22 | (United States) Mahi Temple Shrine Auditorium, Miami, Florida | |
| Win | 13–0 | (Panama) Armando Córdoba | UD | 8 | 2007-05-11 | (United States) Champion Sport Complex, Orlando, Florida | |
| Win | 12–0 | (Mexico) Ricardo Medina | UD | 6 | 2007-04-07 | (United States) Shrine Mosque, Springfield, Missouri | |
| Win | 11–0 | (Nicaragua) Francisco Huerta | TKO | 1 (10), 2:21 | 2007-03-10 | (Puerto Rico) Juan Pachín Vicéns Auditorium, Ponce | |
| Win | 10–0 | (Puerto Rico) Juan Ramón Cruz | TD | 9 (10) | 2006-11-11 | (Puerto Rico) Mario Morales Coliseum, Guaynabo | |
| Win | 9–0 | (Mexico) Ricardo Barrera | KO | 1 (8), 2:05 | 2006-06-17 | (Puerto Rico) Pedrín Zorrilla Coliseum, Hato Rey | |
| Win | 8–0 | (Colombia) Pedro Rincón Miranda | UD | 8 | 2006-04-01 | (Puerto Rico) Mario Morales Coliseum, Guaynabo | |
| Win | 7–0 | (Dominican Republic) Osvaldo Cedeño | UD | 6 | 2005-12-17 | (Puerto Rico) Tomás Dones Coliseum, Fajardo | |
| Win | 6–0 | (United States) Michael Connolly | UD | 4 | 2005-08-26 | (United States) Thunderbird Wild West Casino, Norman, Oklahoma | |
| Win | 5–0 | (Mexico) Javier Hernández | UD | 4 | 2004-11-19 | Salon Marbet Plus, Ciudad Nezahualcoyotl, Mexico | |
| Win | 4–0 | (Mexico) Alberto Cepeda | TKO | 2 (4), 3:00 | 2002-06-22 | (United States) MGM Grand, Las Vegas, Nevada | |
| Win | 3–0 | (United States) Willie Thomas | TKO | 5 (6) | 2001-07-21 | (Puerto Rico) Rubén Rodríguez Coliseum, Bayamón | |
| Win | 2–0 | (Puerto Rico) Eugenio Ventura | KO | 2 | 2001-04-19 | (Puerto Rico) Diamond Palace Hotel, Condado | |
| Win | 1–0 | (Puerto Rico) Alfredo Valdez | KO | 1 | 2000-12-15 | (Puerto Rico) Carolina | Professional debut |

== Awards ==
- 2013 LGBTQ Sports Hall of Fame

== See also ==
- List of Puerto Rican boxing world champions
