= Ignacio Beristáin =

Mexican boxing trainer (b. 1939)

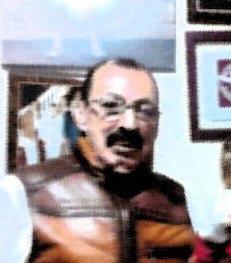

Personal information
- Nickname: Nacho
- Nationality: (Mexico) Mexican
- Born: Ignacio Beristáin; July 31, 1939 (age 86) Actopan, Veracruz, Mexico

Boxing career

Ignacio "Nacho" Beristáin (born July 31, 1939, in Actopan, Veracruz, Mexico) is a Mexican trainer in the sport of boxing. Beristain is a member of the Boxing Hall of Fame and is considered one of the greatest trainers in the history of boxing.

== Training career ==
Beristain boxed as an amateur in the light flyweight division. He later turned professional, but was forced to retire prematurely in 1959 due to an eye injury. After retirement, he co-managed Vicente Saldivar. As a trainer in the amateur ranks, he led Mexico's boxing teams to multiple medal wins at the 1968, 1976 and 1980 Olympic Games. His first professional world champion was two-division title holder and hall of famer Daniel Zaragoza. He has trained several other notable boxers, including hall of fame member brothers Juan Manuel Márquez and Rafael Márquez and other fellow hall of famers, such as Ricardo López, and Humberto "Chiquita" González, having trained them from their initial careers to the top of the pound for pound rankings. He also had a brief stint in training Oscar De La Hoya when De La Hoya faced Manny Pacquiao in December 2008.

=== Notable boxers trained ===
- Ricardo López - two-weight world champion; International Boxing Hall of Fame inductee
- Juan Manuel Márquez - four-division world champion; International Boxing Hall of Fame inductee
- Rafael Márquez - two-division champion; International Boxing Hall of Fame inductee
- Daniel Zaragoza - four-time champion; International Boxing Hall of Fame inductee
- Humberto González - four-time champion; International Boxing Hall of Fame inductee
- Victor Rabanales - bantamweight champion
- Oscar De La Hoya - six-division champion
- Jorge Arce - four-time champion
- Guty Espadas - flyweight champion
- Guty Espadas, Jr. - featherweight champion
- Alfredo Angulo - jr middleweight
- Enrique Sánchez - bantamweight champion
- Gilberto Román - two-time champion (with 11 title defenses)
- Jhonny González - two division champion
- Melchor Cob Castro - two-time champion
- Rodolfo López - featherweight champion
- Alejandro Barrera - jr middleweight
- Abner Mares - three division champion
- Vicente Escobedo - former title challenger
- Juan Carlos Salgado - two-time champion
- Jorge Paez - two-time champion
- Julio César Chávez Jr. - middleweight champion
- Rey Vargas - two-division champion

=== Boxing Hall of Fame ===
In 2006, Beristáin became a member of the World Boxing Hall of Fame as a trainer. Then on December 7, 2010, he was inducted to the International Boxing Hall of Fame, alongside legendary Mexican champion Julio César Chávez, Russian Australian Undisputed Junior Welterweight World Champion, Kostya Tszyu, heavyweight champion Mike Tyson, and actor Sylvester Stallone.
