= Ricky Hatton vs. Paulie Malignaggi =

Boxing competition

Power vs. Precision
- Date: November 22, 2008
- Venue: MGM Grand Garden Arena, Paradise, Nevada, US
- Title(s) on the line: IBO and The Ring light welterweight titles

Tale of the tape
Boxer	(United Kingdom) Ricky Hatton	(United States) Paulie Malignaggi
Nickname	"The Hitman"	"The Magic Man"
Hometown	Stockport, Manchester, UK	Brooklyn, New York, US
Pre-fight record	44–1 (31 KO)	25–1 (7 KO)
Age	30 years, 1 month	27 years, 11 months
Height	5 ft 6 in (168 cm)	5 ft 7 in (170 cm)
Weight	140 lb (64 kg)	139 lb (63 kg)
Style	Orthodox	Orthodox
Recognition	IBO and The Ring; Light Welterweight Champion; IBF/WBO; No. 3 Ranked Light Welterweight; 2-division world champion	Former IBF light welterweight champion

Result
- Hatton wins via 11th-round TKO

Ricky Hatton vs. Paulie Malignaggi, billed as the Power vs. Precision, was a boxing light welterweight match-up for the IBO and The Ring titles that was held on November 22, 2008 at the MGM Grand Las Vegas. The fight was won by Ricky Hatton as Paulie Malignaggi was withdrawn by his corner during the 11th round.

== Build-up ==
Ricky Hatton had been at the top of the rankings since his victory over Kostya Tszyu and followed up with wins over Juan Urango, José Luis Castillo and Juan Lazcano. Malignaggi was the former IBF champion who had beaten the likes of Herman NGoudjo and Lovemore N'Dou. Both of the fighters fought on the same bill in Manchester, England at Hatton's Homecoming fight at the City of Manchester Stadium following his loss to Floyd Mayweather Jr., Hatton winning a unanimous decision against Juan Lazcano and Malignaggi winning a split decision against Lovermore N'Dou. During Malignaggi's fight he had to get a haircut in between the rounds.
Another Major event that preceded the fight was the firing of long term trainer Billy Graham by Hatton and employing Floyd Mayweather Sr., father of the only man to beat him, at that time, into his corner. Malignaggi's trainer Buddy McGirt remained adamant that Hatton was past his best and insisted Malignaggi would beat him. Hatton did admit that if he was beaten he would retire.

== The fight ==
Michael Buffer introduced the fight on HBO World Championship Boxing and the referee was Kenny Bayless.
Malignaggi started off the fight well, winning the first round by utilising his jab and getting a rhythm, However, in the second round a massive right by Hatton shook Malignaggi and he had to hold on for the rest of the round. From then on Hatton took control and won all the other rounds, with more big shots and combinations, until Malignaggi's trainer, Buddy McGirt threw in the towel in the 11th round. McGirt had warned Malignaggi that if he didn't do better in the next round he would pull him out and he stuck to his word.
Hatton jumped up onto the ropes as Malignaggi furiously protested to, and pushed McGirt. However the final scores of 99-91 from all three judges proved that Malignaggi would not have been able to defeat Hatton on points in the remaining rounds.

== Aftermath ==
It was thought that if Hatton won he would fight the winner of Oscar De La Hoya vs. Manny Pacquiao. When Manny Pacquiao defeated De La Hoya it was arranged that they would meet on May 2 in Las Vegas. Hatton was swiftly defeated. Malignaggi contemplated retirement but decided to fight on for money.

== Undercard ==
- (United Kingdom) Matthew Hatton defeats (Ghana) Ben Tackie via unanimous decision.
- (United States) James Kirkland KOs (United States) Brian Vera in the eighth round.
- (Thailand) Sirimongkol Singmanasak defeats (Mexico) Rogelio Castaneda Jr via majority decision.
- (Mexico) Heriberto Ruiz defeats (Philippines) Rey Bautista via unanimous decision.
- (United States) Adrien Broner KOs (United States) Terrance Jett in the sixth round.
- (United States) Danny Garcia defeats (United States) Adan Hernandez via unanimous decision.
- (United States) Hylon Williams Jr. defeats (Mexico) Ramon Flores via unanimous decision.
- (United States) Adrian Gonzalez defeats (Mexico) Jose Pacheco via unanimous decision.

Preceded by vs. Juan Lazcano	Ricky Hatton's bouts November 22, 2008	Succeeded by vs. Manny Pacquiao
Preceded by vs. Lovemore N'dou	Paulie Malignaggi's bouts November 22, 2008	Succeeded by vs. Christopher Fernandez
