= Lovemore N'dou =

South African Australian boxer (born 1971)

Lovemore Nḓou
Personal information
- Nickname: The Black Panther
- Nationality: South African; Australian
- Born: 16 August 1971 (age 54) Musina, South Africa
- Weight: Super-featherweight; Lightweight; Light-welterweight; Welterweight; Light-middleweight

Boxing career
- Stance: Orthodox

Boxing record
- Total fights: 64
- Wins: 49
- Win by KO: 31
- Losses: 13
- Draws: 2

Lovemore Ray Nḓou (born 16 August 1971) is a South African-Australian solicitor and former professional boxer who competed from 1993 to 2012. He held the IBF junior-welterweight title in 2007, and the IBO welterweight title from 2009 to 2010.

== Professional career ==
Lovemore was born in Musina, South Africa, and started boxing at the age of 16. He had a successful amateur career of 68 fights with 66 wins and 2 losses, where he was a four-time South African champion in four consecutive years. He could not compete on an international level as South Africa then was banned from international competition due to its practice of Apartheid.

Ndou made his professional debut in 1993 against Enoch Khuzwayo in Johannesburg, South Africa winning on a points decision.

In his 13th professional fight in August 1995, N'dou fought for the South African Super Featherweight Title against Mthobeli Mhlophe with the contest ending in a draw. After that bout N'dou left South Africa and migrated to settle in Australia beginning a run of 17 consecutive victories from May 1996 to June 2000 rising to a world WBC #2 ranking, before a loss in a 10-round unanimous points decision against former WBC International champion Guillermo Mosquera.

After the loss to Mosquera, Ndou lost motivation and fought rarely with only 3 fights in 2 years before heading to the United States for 3 fights during 2002 culminating in 2 losses.

Ndou won his first major professional title on 29 November 2002 defeating Sarit Saeknaew by TKO to claim the IBF Pan Pacific Light Welterweight Title at Festival Hall in Melbourne. During 2003, N'dou made three successful defences of his IBF Pan Pacific Light Welterweight Title before an IBF World Light Welterweight Title bout against Sharmba Mitchell on 7 February 2004 in Atlantic City, USA. N'dou lost the bout against Mitchell via a unanimous points decision.

Following the loss to Mitchell, Ndou returned to Australia to defend his IBF Pan Pacific Light Welterweight Title twice before heading to Las Vegas, Nevada, USA to fight Miguel Angel Cotto for the WBC International Light Welterweight Title and WBA Fedelatin Light Welterweight Title on 8 May 2004 with Ndou again losing via a unanimous points decision. N'dou closed out 2004 retaining his IBF Pan Pacific Light Welterweight Title against Ruben Francisco Silva Diaz in Sydney.

Ndou began 2005 with a 12 rounds unanimous points loss to Junior Witter at the Staples Center, Los Angeles, USA for the Commonwealth Light Welterweight Title. Over the next 18 months following the loss to Witter, Ndou defended his IBF Pan Pacific Light Welterweight Title on four occasions to rise to the world IBF #1 Light Welterweight ranking at the start of 2007.

On 4 February 2007 in Sydney, Ndou fought in the Australian Fight of the Year and defeated Naoufel Ben Rabah in an IBF World Light Welterweight Title Eliminator for the right to meet current title holder Ricky Hatton, after Hatton had won the title against Juan Urango in Las Vegas, USA two weeks earlier. Hatton however refused the IBF's demand that he fight Ndou for the IBF World Light Welterweight Title, instead scheduling a fight against José Luis Castillo. Following Hatton's decision, the IBF stripped Hatton of the IBF World Light Welterweight Title, awarding N'dou the title on 12 February 2007. N'dou lost his first title defense on 16 June 2007 against American Paul Malignaggi in Uncasville, Connecticut, USA.

After that bout Ndou stayed in America and worked as the main sparring partner for Floyd Mayweather for his bout against Ricky Hatton. While waiting to fight Malignaggi again he knocked out Rafael Ortiz in the 7th round as a stay busy fight. On 24 May 2008, Lovemore got his rematch against Malignaggi. The bout was fought as the main supporting bout to the Ricky Hatton vs. Juan Lazcano bout at the City of Manchester Stadium in Manchester, United Kingdom. The bout was a much different one from their first encounter, with Malignaggi taking the lead a lot more and Ndou playing the role of counter-puncher. CompuBox Punchstats showed that Ndou landed 23% of his punches, while Malignaggi connected with 17%. In the end the Malignaggi again won the bout, this time by a close split decision.

== Legal career ==
Ndou studied law at the University of Western Sydney, and having retired from boxing operated a legal practice, Lovemore Lawyers, in Rockdale, Sydney.

== Political career ==
Ndou returned to South Africa and contested the 2024 South African general election as an independent.

== Professional boxing record ==
64 fights	49 wins	13 losses
By knockout	31	0
By decision	18	13
Draws	2	

Result	Record	Opponent	Type	Round, time	Date	Location	Notes
Win	49–13–2	(Australia) Gairy St Clair	UD	12	2012-08-10	Southport RSL Club, Southport, Australia	Won vacant IBF Pan Pacific Welterweight Title and vacant World Boxing Foundation World Welterweight Title.
Loss	48–13–2	(United Kingdom) Kell Brook	UD	12	2011-06-25	(United Kingdom) Hillsborough Leisure Centre, Sheffield, UK	For vacant WBA Inter-Continental Welterweight Title
Loss	48–12–2	(Mexico) Canelo Alvarez	UD	12	2010-02-01	Estadio Beto Ávila, Veracruz, Mexico	For WBC Silver Super Welterweight Title
Win	48–11–2	(South Africa) Bongani Mwelase	SD	12	2010-09-18	Emperors Palace, Kempton Park, South Africa	Retained International Boxing Organization World Welterweight Title
Draw	47–11–2	(United Kingdom) Matthew Hatton	PTS	12	2009-11-13	(United Kingdom) Fenton Manor Sports Complex, Stoke-on-Trent, UK	Retained International Boxing Organization World Welterweight Title

Sporting positions
World boxing titles
Vacant Title last held by Ricky Hatton stripped	IBF junior-welterweight champion 12 February 2007 – 16 June 2007	Succeeded by Paulie Malignaggi
