= Herman Ngoudjo =

Cameroonian boxer (born 1979)

Personal information
- Nickname: Black Panther
- Nationality: Cameroonian; Canadian
- Born: 25 June 1979 (age 47) Douala, Cameroon
- Height: 5 ft 9 in (175 cm)
- Weight: Light-welterweight

Boxing career
- Reach: 73 in (185 cm)
- Stance: Orthodox

Boxing record
- Total fights: 22
- Wins: 18
- Win by KO: 10
- Losses: 4
Medal record
Representing Cameroon
Men's amateur boxing
Commonwealth Games
Silver medal – second place	1998 Kuala Lumpur	Bantamweight
All-Africa Games
Bronze medal – third place	1999 Johannesburg	Bantamweight
Francophone Games
Bronze medal – third place	2001 Ottawa	Bantamweight

Herman Ngoudjo (born 25 June 1979) is a Cameroonian-Canadian former professional boxer who competed from 2003 to 2010, and challenged twice for the IBF junior-welterweight title in 2008 and 2009. As an amateur he represented Cameroon at the 2000 Olympics, reaching the opening round of the bantamweight bracket. Earlier he won a silver medal at the 1998 Commonwealth Games, also in the bantamweight division.

== Professional career ==
Ngoudjo turned professional on November 22, 2003 in Montreal, Quebec, where he now resides. He defeated Eloy Rojas on February 26, 2005 to win the NABF light welterweight title and Emanuel Augustus on February 25, 2006 to win the WBC International light welterweight title. On January 20, 2007, he lost a split decision to top ten pound-for-pound super-lightweight José Luis Castillo. Ngoudjo was considered a tune-up fight for Castillo and shocked the HBO audience by going the distance in a WBC light welterweight title eliminator. He defeated Randall Bailey in a split decision June 8 on ESPN to set up a fight for the IBF title.

On January 5, 2008 Ngoudjo was defeated by IBF light welterweight champion Paul Malignaggi by unanimous decision at the Bally's Hotel & Casino in Atlantic City, New Jersey. It was a highly competitive bout. Malignaggi controlled the fight early on, but in the 7th round Ngoudjo stunned the champ but was unable to capitalize. During the remainder of the fight Ngoudjo continued to be the aggressor but the judges awarded the fight to Malignaggi by a wide decision.

On June 6, 2008, at Uniprix Stadium in Montreal, Quebec, Ngoudjo fought through a badly swollen left eye and managed a unanimous decision victory over former WBA light welterweight champion Souleymane M'baye. After Ngoudjo produced a stellar second round, he was faced with adversity the next round as his left eye quickly began to close. M'baye did his best to take advantage of Ngoudjo as he turned the fight into an inside battle. The ring doctor examined Ngoudjo at the beginning of the fifth round and proclaimed him fit to carry on. By the sixth round, Ngoudjo seemed in trouble as he was getting beaten up when on the inside and was getting picked off with relative ease when staying on the outside. M'baye seemed in control until the later rounds when Ngoudjo let his hands go to full effect. Ngoudjo won by scores of 117-111, 116-112, and 115-113.

== Professional boxing record ==
22 fights	18 wins	4 losses
By knockout	10	0
By decision	8	4

No.	Result	Record	Opponent	Type	Round, time	Date	Location	Notes
22	Loss	18–4	Julio Díaz	UD	10	14 May 2010	Star of the Desert Arena, Primm, Nevada, U.S.	
21	Win	18–3	Silverio Ortiz	TKO	6 (8), 1:43	6 Feb 2010	Montreal Casino, Montreal, Quebec, Canada	
20	Loss	17–3	Juan Urango	UD	12	30 Jan 2009	Bell Centre, Montreal, Quebec, Canada	For vacant IBF light welterweight title
19	Win	17–2	Souleymane M'baye	UD	12	6 Jun 2008	Uniprix Stadium, Montreal, Quebec, Canada	
18	Loss	16–2	Paulie Malignaggi	UD	12	5 Jan 2008	Bally's Park Place, Atlantic City, New Jersey, U.S.	For IBF light welterweight title
17	Win	16–1	Randall Bailey	SD	12	8 Jun 2007	Uniprix Stadium, Montreal, Quebec, Canada	
16	Loss	15–1	José Luis Castillo	SD	12	20 Jan 2007	Paris Las Vegas, Paradise, Nevada, U.S.	Lost WBC-NABF light welterweight title
15	Win	15–0	Donald Camarena	UD	12	28 Oct 2006	Casino du Lac-Leamy, Gatineau, Quebec, Canada	Retained WBC International and WBC-NABF light welterweight titles
14	Win	14–0	John Brown	UD	12	24 May 2006	Métropolis, Montreal, Quebec, Canada	Retained WBC International and WBC-NABF light welterweight titles
13	Win	13–0	Juan Carlos Alderete	TKO	12 (12), 1:39	25 Feb 2006	Casino du Lac-Leamy, Gatineau, Quebec, Canada	Retained WBC International light welterweight title
12	Win	12–0	Emanuel Augustus	UD	12	15 Oct 2005	Montreal Casino, Montreal, Quebec, Canada	Retained WBC-NABF light welterweight title; Won vacant WBC International light welterweight title
11	Win	11–0	Juan Carlos Rodriguez	UD	12	14 May 2005	Montreal Casino, Montreal, Quebec, Canada	Retained WBC-NABF light welterweight title
10	Win	10–0	Arturo Urena	UD	10	9 Apr 2005	Montreal Casino, Montreal, Quebec, Canada	
9	Win	9–0	Eloy Rojas	TKO	8 (12), 3:00	26 Mar 2005	Casino du Lac-Leamy, Gatineau, Quebec, Canada	Won vacant WBC-NABF light welterweight title
8	Win	8–0	Ambioris Figuero	TKO	2 (8), 2:07	13 Nov 2004	Montreal Casino, Montreal, Quebec, Canada	
7	Win	7–0	Joshua Smith	TKO	6 (6), 2:12	9 Oct 2004	Montreal Casino, Montreal, Quebec, Canada	
6	Win	6–0	Leonardo Rojas	TKO	3 (6), 3:00	11 Sep 2004	Montreal Casino, Montreal, Quebec, Canada	
5	Win	5–0	Jorge Alberto Padilla	SD	4	13 Aug 2004	Pechanga Resort & Casino, Temecula, California, U.S.	
4	Win	4–0	Dave Drouin	TKO	2 (4), 0:50	24 Apr 2004	Colisée Pepsi, Montreal, Quebec, Canada	
3	Win	3–0	Holbrook Storr	TKO	2 (4), 1:15	20 Mar 2004	Montreal Casino, Montreal, Quebec, Canada	
2	Win	2–0	Denver Cupps	TKO	1 (4), 2:31	20 Dec 2003	Bell Centre, Montreal, Quebec, Canada	
1	Win	1–0	Stephane Savage	TKO	2 (4), 2:48	22 Nov 2003	Bell Centre, Montreal, Quebec, Canada	

Sporting positions
Regional boxing titles
Vacant Title last held by Terrance Cauthen	NABF light-welterweight champion 26 February 2005 – 20 January 2007	Succeeded by José Luis Castillo
Vacant Title last held by Paulie Malignaggi	WBC International light-welterweight champion 15 October 2005 – 20 January 2007; Lost eliminator for world title	Vacant Title next held by Ricky Hatton
