= Floyd Mayweather Jr. vs. Ricky Hatton =

2007 professional boxing match

Undefeated
- Date: December 8, 2007
- Venue: MGM Grand Garden Arena, Paradise, Nevada, U.S.
- Title(s) on the line: WBC and The Ring welterweight titles

Tale of the tape
Boxer	Floyd Mayweather Jr.	Ricky Hatton
Nickname	Pretty Boy	The Hitman
Hometown	Grand Rapids, Michigan, U.S.	Manchester, England
Purse	$25,000,000	$10,000,000
Pre-fight record	38–0 (24 KO)	43–0 (31 KO)
Age	30 years, 9 months	29 years, 2 months
Height	5 ft 8 in (173 cm)	5 ft 6 1/2 in (169 cm)
Weight	147 lb (67 kg)	145 lb (66 kg)
Style	Orthodox	Orthodox
Recognition	WBC and The Ring welterweight champion The Ring No. 1 ranked pound-for-pound fighter 5-division world champion	IBO and The Ring light welterweight champion The Ring No. 8 ranked pound-for-pound fighter 2-division world champion

Result
- Mayweather wins via 10th-round technical knockout

Floyd Mayweather Jr. vs. Ricky Hatton, billed as Undefeated, was a professional boxing match that took place on December 8, 2007, at the MGM Grand Garden Arena in Las Vegas, between reigning WBC and The Ring welterweight champion Floyd Mayweather Jr. and reigning The Ring light welterweight champion Ricky Hatton.

The fight was for Mayweather's WBC & The Ring welterweight titles. Mayweather defeated Hatton by TKO in the tenth round.

== Background ==
The referee for the fight was Joe Cortez, with Burt Clements, Dave Moretti and Paul Smith as the three judges. Hatton weighed in at 145 lbs and Mayweather at 147 lbs.

In attendance were celebrities such as Denzel Washington, Fábio Coentrão, Diego Milito, Simon Bird, Bruce Willis, Sylvester Stallone, Angelina Jolie, Mario Lopez, Brad Pitt, Wesley Snipes, Will Ferrell, Gwen Stefani, Jimmy Kimmel, Tiger Woods, Jude Law, Jamie Hunt, David Lochery, footballer David Beckham, Kid Rock, fellow Dancing with the Stars alums, Wayne Newton, Mark Cuban and season 5 winner Hélio Castroneves and Karina Smirnoff, who is Mayweather's dance partner. At the weigh in the crowd were whipped into a frenzy as Joe Calzaghe (who was there supporting Hatton) squared up to American legend Bernard Hopkins (who was there supporting Mayweather).

Throughout the weigh-in, fans of Hatton could be heard singing "Hatton Wonderland" and booed Mayweather. Prior to the fight, Tom Jones sang "God Save the Queen", and Tyrese Gibson sang "The Star-Spangled Banner".

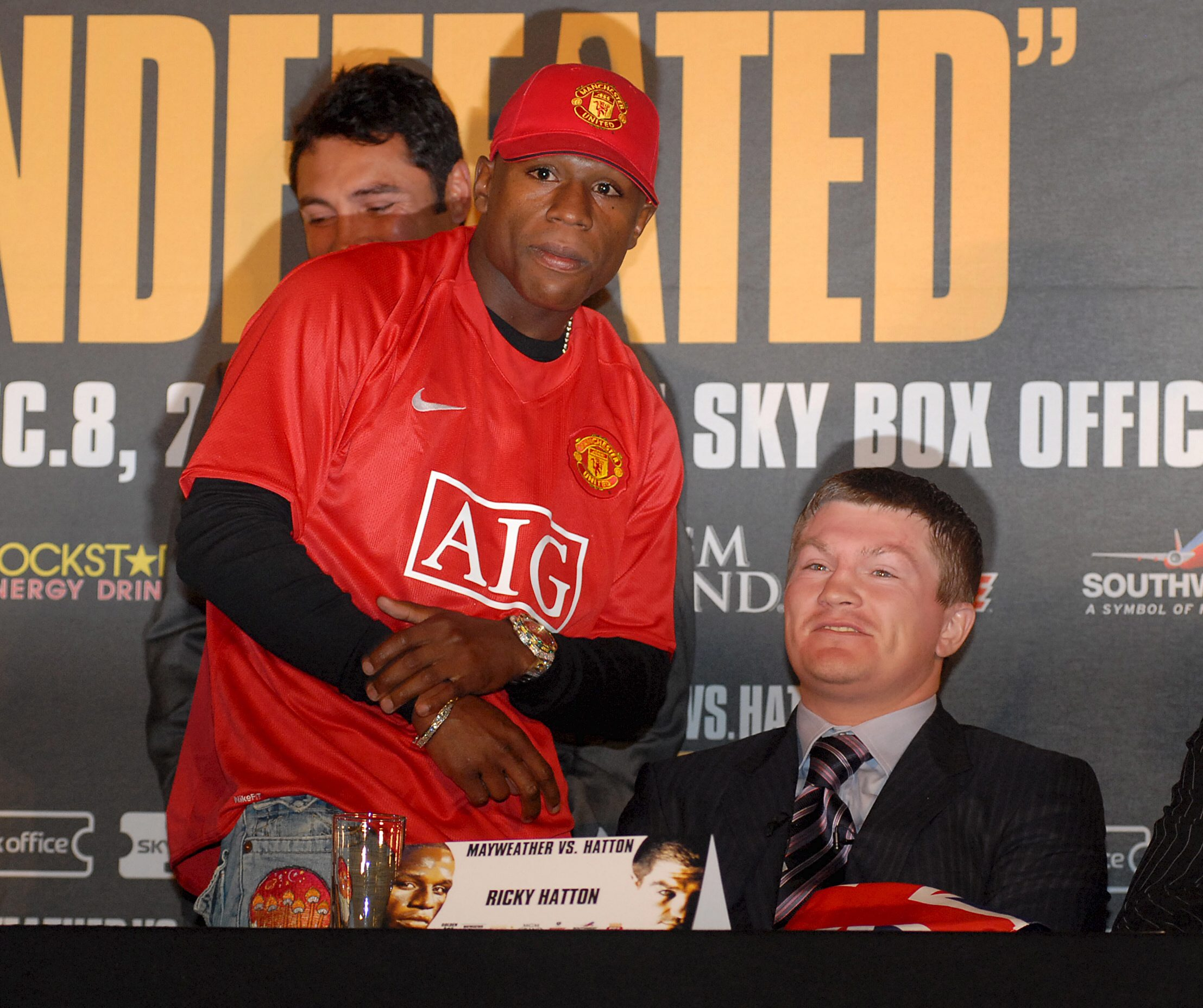
Hatton and Mayweather at a press conference in Manchester, 2007; Mayweather is seen wearing the colours of Manchester United in a bid to get under the skin of Hatton, an avid supporter of local rivals Manchester City

Hatton entered the ring first to "Blue Moon", his usual entrance music, Mayweather however chose a change of music for his entrance. In the week prior to the fight sections of the media, largely the British media had hyped the fight as something of a Britain against America fight, comparing the fight to when Lloyd Honeyghan travelled to America to dethrone American Don Curry, then the undisputed world champion, this leading to Mayweather's decision to enter the ring to Bruce Springsteen's "Born in the U.S.A.". Shortly before the start of the match, the Hatton fans also repeatedly booed the American national anthem, drawing large criticism post-fight.

The fight had 920,000 buys on HBO in the United States. It also drew 1,150,000 buys in the United Kingdom on Sky Box Office, setting a domestic record that stood until 2011.

== The fight ==
Hatton tried to compete with Mayweather in the early rounds. In the first round Hatton caught Mayweather with a left jab which knocked Mayweather off balance. His constant pressure appeared to make Mayweather uncomfortable at first, but soon gave way. In the third round, Mayweather landed a right that cut Hatton above the right eye. In round six, referee Joe Cortez took a point away from Hatton after he threw punches at the back of Mayweathers' head when he was forced under the top rope. Hatton became angry at the referee's decision to deduct a point from him and turned his back on him in frustration, shaking his bottom at Mayweather. Hatton would later claim that he had become angry by the referee and that had caused him to lose his calm and contributed to his downfall. Hatton was able to hold his own, until round six, after Hatton got worn down from chasing Mayweather around the ring. Mayweather sensed the exhaustion of Hatton, and pursued Hatton's punches with stiff, damaging counterpunches. Mayweather was clearly in control before rocking Hatton in the 10th round. He sent Hatton straight into the turnbuckle then down with a left hook, and Hatton was badly hurt. He looked disorientated when he got up, but referee Joe Cortez let the fight continue.

Mayweather wasted no time jumping on him again, landing a flurry of punches, including another left hook that sent Hatton staggering backward and down again. Cortez called off the fight at 1:35 without a count at the same time the white towel was thrown from Hatton's corner. The fight received large amounts of publicity, with both fighters promoting the fight heavily.

== Aftermath ==
Mayweather announced his retirement from boxing on June 6, 2008. He returned to the ring 15 months later to beat Juan Manuel Márquez by a 12-round unanimous decision. Mayweather went on to appear at World Wrestling Entertainment (WWE)'s No Way Out pay-per-view on February 17, 2008, in Las Vegas, Nevada, where he was involved in a storyline physical altercation with Big Show, which led to a match at WrestleMania XXIV.

Hatton defeated Juan Lazcano at the City of Manchester Stadium in Manchester on May 24, 2008 in a "thank-you" bout for the tremendous fan support he has received throughout his entire professional career. The last time Hatton fought in Manchester was back in 2005 against Kostya Tszyu. Hatton went on to fight Paul Malignaggi for the IBF light welterweight championship in November 2008. The fight was very one sided and Ricky won comfortably by way of TKO in the 11th round. Hatton would eventually lose to Manny Pacquiao via second-round KO and put his career on an indefinite hiatus. He eventually announced his retirement on 7 July 2011.

== Undercard ==
- (Mexico) Daniel Ponce de León defeats (Mexico) Eduardo Escobedo via unanimous decision for the WBO super bantamweight title.
- (United States) Jeff Lacy defeats (United States) Peter Manfredo Jr. via unanimous decision.
- (The Bahamas) Edner Cherry KOs (United States) Wes Ferguson in the sixth round.
- (United Kingdom) Matthew Hatton defeats (Puerto Rico) Frankie Santos via unanimous decision.
- (Puerto Rico) Jonathan Oquendo KOs (Colombia) Andres Ledesma in the first round.
- (United States) Jose Angel Rodriguez had a majority draw with (United States) Ishmail Arvin.
- (United States) Daniel Jacobs KOs (United States) Jose Jesus Hurtado in the first round.
- (United States) Danny Garcia KOs (United States) Jesus Villareal in the second round.

== Broadcasting ==
Country	Broadcaster
Australia	Main Event
Canada	Viewers Choice
Philippines	ABS-CBN / Studio 23
United Kingdom	Sky Sports
United States	HBO

Preceded by vs. Oscar De La Hoya	Floyd Mayweather Jr.'s bouts December 8, 2007	Succeeded by vs. Juan Manuel Márquez
Preceded by vs. José Luis Castillo	Ricky Hatton's bouts December 8, 2007	Succeeded by vs. Juan Lazcano
