= Paul Upton =

English boxer

Paul Upton (born 12 July 1988) is an Irish professional boxer trained by Ricky Hatton.

== Amateur career ==
Upton was an Irish under-21 champion.

== Irish title ==
On 23 April 2016 Upton won the Boxing Union of Ireland super welterweight title defeating Terry Maughan. This was his only fight of 2016.

== Personal life ==
He is one of three boxing brothers, along with Sonny (also trained by Ricky Hatton) and Anthony.
