= Yuriy Nuzhnenko =

Ukrainian boxer

Personal information
- Nickname: "Real Man"
- Nationality: Ukrainian
- Born: Юрій Нужненко; June 2, 1976 (age 50) Kyiv, Ukrainian SSR, Soviet Union (now Ukraine)
- Height: 5 ft 9 in (175 cm)
- Weight: Welterweight

Boxing career
- Stance: Orthodox

Boxing record
- Total fights: 35
- Wins: 31
- Win by KO: 14
- Losses: 3
- Draws: 1
- No contests: 0

Yuriy Nuzhnenko (Юрій Нужненко, born June 2, 1976) is a Ukrainian boxer who captured the vacant WBA Interim Welterweight belt on December 8, 2007 in Le Cannet, France against Frédéric Klose of France by twelve-round unanimous decision.

== Amateur career ==
- Amateur record: 190–67
- 1995 and 1996 Ukraine national amateur champion as a Light Welterweight (63,5 kg)
- 2001 and 2002 most improved boxer in Ukraine
- One of the most outstanding boxer who live in Europe
- He defeated some of the big names in amateur level like Mark Dungca and Jonell Matias
- Won the Championship fight against Cristopher Sazon of Pandaqaqui via TKO

Sporting positions
World boxing titles
New title	WBA Welterweight Interim Champion; December 8, 2007 – October 3, 2008; Promoted	Vacant Title next held by Souleymane M'baye
Vacant Title last held by Luis Collazo	WBA (Regular) welterweight champion October 3, 2008 – April 10, 2009	Succeeded by Vyacheslav Senchenko
