= Ricky Hatton vs. Juan Lazcano =

Boxing competition

Homecoming
- Date: 24 May 2008
- Venue: City of Manchester Stadium, Manchester, UK
- Title(s) on the line: IBO and The Ring light welterweight titles

Tale of the tape
| Boxer | (United Kingdom) Ricky Hatton | (Mexico) Juan Lazcano |
| Nickname | "The Hitman" | "The Chosen Juan" |
| Hometown | Stockport, Manchester, UK | Sacramento, California, US |
| Pre-fight record | 43–1 (31 KO) | 37–4–1 (27 KO) |
| Age | 29 years, 7 months | 33 years, 2 months |
| Height | 5 ft 6 in (168 cm) | 5 ft 9 in (175 cm) |
| Weight | 139 3/4 lb (63 kg) | 139 3/4 lb (63 kg) |
| Style | Orthodox | Orthodox |
| Recognition | IBO and The Ring; Light Welterweight Champion; WBC/WBO; No. 2 Ranked Light Welterweight; IBF; No. 4 Ranked Light Welterweight; The Ring No. 8 ranked pound-for-pound fighter 2-division world champion | Former IBA lightweight titleholder |

Result
- Hatton wins via 12-round unanimous decision (120-110, 118-110, 120-108)

Ricky Hatton vs. Juan Lazcano, billed as Homecoming, was a boxing light welterweight fight between Ricky Hatton and challenger Juan Lazcano for the IBO and The Ring titles. It was held in Manchester, England at the City of Manchester Stadium in front of a record 55,000 fans. This was a record for a boxing event post world war II, until 2014 when Carl Froch faced George Groves, fight which sold 80,000 seats. The fight went the full 12 rounds and Hatton won by unanimous decision.

== Background ==
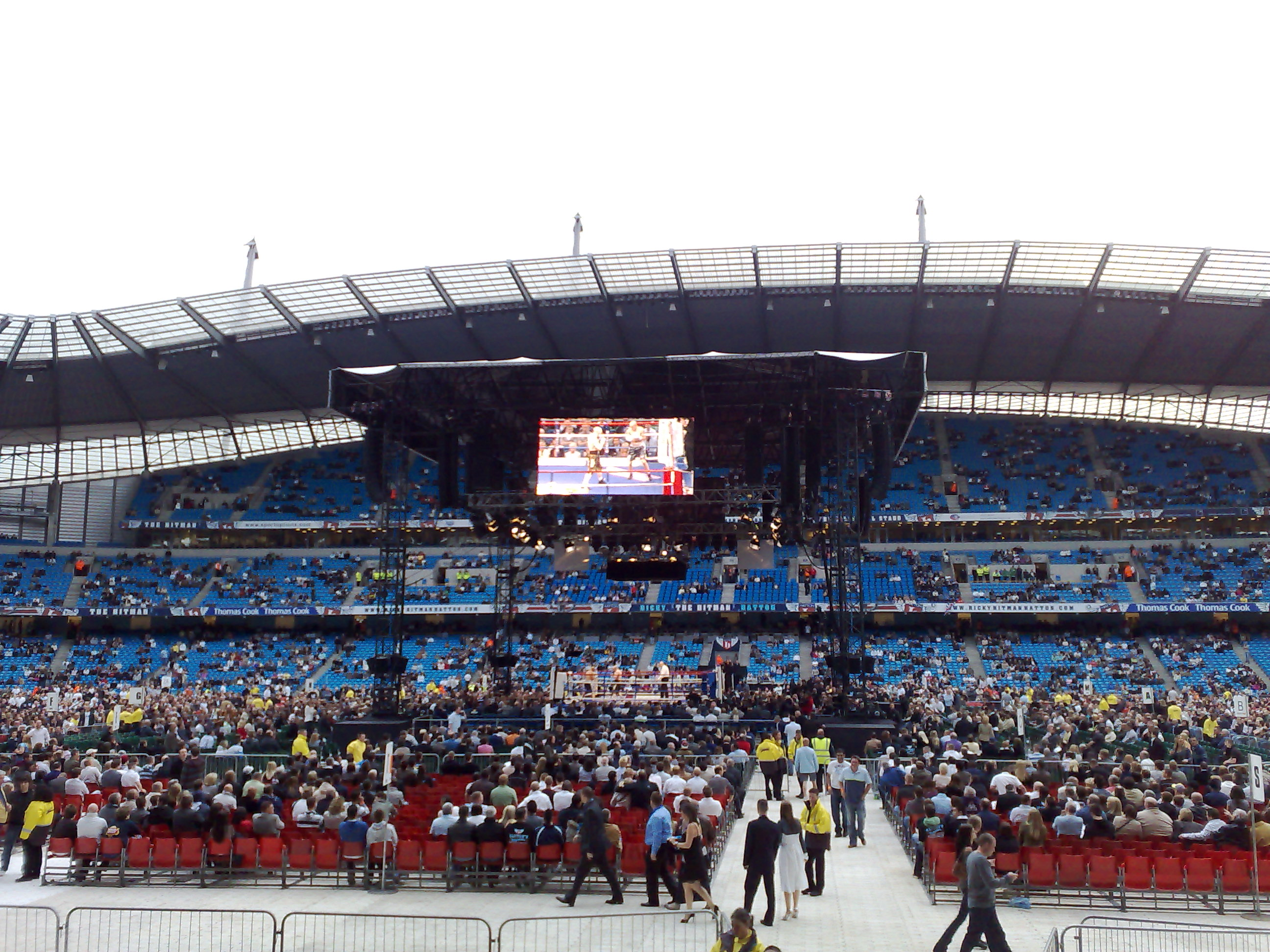
The City of Manchester Stadium pictured before the fight.

Hatton was coming off his first career loss to Floyd Mayweather Jr. and was fighting for the first time back in Manchester. It was a thanks to all his fans who had travelled to the States to watch his previous four fights and was held in his home Football ground of Manchester City.

Lazcano was ranked among the top ten light welterweights by the Ring Magazine. His only stoppage defeat was to Golden Johnson ten years earlier, he had most recently lost to Vivian Harris.

Paulie Malignaggi was on the undercard as he and Hatton were meant to fight each other later in the year.

The weigh-in took place at the Trafford Centre in Manchester and there was a lot of anticipation about Hatton's Ring Entrance. A lot of people were criticizing his diet between fights and were saying he was past his best, He wanted to prove them wrong and also take a dig at them at the same time. Hatton said it could be his last in Britain.
The fight was on Sky Box Office in the UK and Versus (TV channel) in the United States. Juan Lazcano saw an upset on the cards and trainer Ronnie Shields was saying that Hatton was washed up and ready for the taking.

== The fight ==
The ring entrance involved a version of Hi Ho Silver Lining with the words replaced to mention Hatton, followed by Blue Moon. Hatton appeared in a fat suit and walked to the ring in it, Michael Buffer announced the fighters.
The referee was Howard Foster and the judges were Marcus McDonell, Pat Russell and Phil Austin. Hatton who was rocked badly in the eighth and tenth round, and in the tenth critics claim, only survived, when the fight was stopped, so he could tie his shoes, while badly hurt. Despite being a bad performance, the judges scores of 120-110, 118-110 and 120-108 . Hatton also rocked Lazcano several times and had him against the ropes using the full repertoire of shots, with Lazcano's back bruised from being constantly pushed against the ropes.

Malignaggi also won a split decision against Lovemore N'dou to set up their fight.

== Aftermath ==
Hatton decided to hire Floyd Mayweather Sr. for his next fight with Paulie Malignaggi and would go on to win that as well. Lazcano has not fought since.

== Undercard ==
Confirmed bouts:

== Broadcasting ==
| Country | Broadcaster |
|---|---|
| Mexico | Televisa |
| United Kingdom | Sky Sports |
| United States | Versus |

| Preceded by vs. Floyd Mayweather Jr. | Ricky Hatton's bouts 24 May 2008 | Succeeded by vs. Paulie Malignaggi |
| Preceded by vs. Vivian Harris | Juan Lazcano's bouts 24 May 2008 | Retired |
