= Barnabus Manchester =

UK Christian homeless charity

Barnabus is a Manchester-based Christian charity that offers support to homeless and vulnerable people through its drop-in centre. The charity has a small team of staff including support workers and around 70 volunteers.

== History ==
Barnabus began in 1991, as founder Peter Green took to the streets of the city with a bag of sandwiches and a thermos flask, meeting the homeless and giving out food to those in need. In 2000 the Beacon Drop-In Centre was opened. The boxer Ricky Hatton became a patron for Barnabus in 2013. In 2014 Manchester nightclub Sankeys teamed up with Barnabus, donating unclaimed items from the club's cloakroom to the charity.

== Beacon Drop-In Centre ==
The Beacon Drop-In Centre is located on Bloom Street in Manchester city centre. It is open five days and five evenings, offering food, clean clothing, blankets, hot showers and dignity/toiletry packs for the homeless community. The centre receives around 600 visits per week. Visitors are able to take part in English, maths and IT classes, as well as arts and crafts and other social and community-building activities. Basic first aid is also offered two evenings a week by voluntary nurses and paramedics.

== Street Soccer ==
In 2005, Barnabus and Manchester City Mission came together to establish the Street Soccer initiative, which offered homeless men a chance to get involved in organised football activities. Today Street Soccer operates in five boroughs and has regular contact with 50 men of all ages.

== Awards and recognition ==
In 2005 Barnabus received Queen Elizabeth II's "Unsung Heroes" award for Voluntary Service.
