= Vyacheslav Senchenko =

Ukrainian boxer (born 1977)

Vyacheslav Senchenko В'ячеслав Сенченко
Personal information
- Nationality: Ukrainian
- Born: 12 April 1977 (age 49) Kremenchuk, Ukrainian SSR, Soviet Union (now Ukraine)
- Height: 1.78 m (5 ft 10 in)
- Weight: Welterweight

Boxing career
- Reach: 178 cm (70 in)
- Stance: Orthodox

Boxing record
- Total fights: 39
- Wins: 37
- Win by KO: 25
- Losses: 2

Vyacheslav Senchenko (Ukrainian: В'ячеслав Сенченко, IPA: [wjɐtʃeˈslɑu̯ ˈsɛntʃenko]; born 12 April 1977) is a Ukrainian former professional boxer who competed from 2002 to 2015, and held the WBA welterweight (Regular) title from 2009 to 2012.

== Amateur career ==
Senchenko represented Ukraine at the 2000 Olympics in Sydney, competing in the light welterweight division and losing in the round of 16.

== Professional career ==
Senchenko made his professional debut in July 2002 and by his fourth bout won the WBC CIS and Slovenian Boxing Bureau (CISBB) welterweight title, a title he defended against Dzmitri Kashkan February 2003 and that September against Russian Evgeny Ershov.

On April 8, 2004, Senchenko won the IBF Inter-Continental welterweight title, stopping Aliaksandr Shnip after just three rounds in Donetsk. He went on to defend four times in the next year and a half, with defeats of Bagaza Mwambene, Cesar Alberto Leiva, Arthur Nowak and French champion Brice Faradji.

At the start of 2006, Senchencko now unbeaten at 16–0 with 11 knockouts moved away from the Inter-Continental title and faced Kazakh, Assan Seksenbayev for the IBF International welterweight title. Senchenko once again emerged victorious in front of his home crowd in the Druzhba Arena in Donetsk. That September he defended at Druzhba once more with a TKO win over Stephane Benito. In November professionally fought outside of Eastern Europe for the first time, going to Monaco to defeat Italian Vincenzo Finzi on the undercard of a Roman Greenberg bout.

His high activity with Union Boxing Promotions continued. Just the next month he was back in Donetsk to fight for add the EBU-EE (European External European Union) welterweight title to his collection against Giorgi Ungiadze. Now somewhat of a permanent fixture at the Druzhba, Senchenko defended this title there four more times in 2007. The last of the year came against fellow Ukrainian Viktor Sydorenko, in a fight also for the WBA Inter-Continental welterweight title. Sydorenko's corner threw in the towel in the third, adding yet another second rate international title to Senchenkos repertoire.

In 2008 he would defend the WBA Inter-Continental welterweight title three more times at the Druzhba, with wins against Stuart Elwell, EBU champion Frederic Klose and Brazilian Adonisio Francisco Reges. After this success, the WBA ranked him 3rd in the world, putting him in path for a World Championship bout.

=== WBA welterweight champion ===
In 2009 Senchenko finally got the chance to fight for a world title. On April 10, 2009 he would face fellow Ukrainian and WBA (regular) World champion Yuriy Nuzhnenko. This was a landmark bout, as for the first time in almost twenty years since paid boxing made its entrance into the former Soviet Union, two local fighters would clash against each other for the legitimate (regular) world championship in their Homeland. Both fighters went into the bout unbeaten and with 28 wins. In a hard fought bout Senchenko dominated on the judges cards and won by Unanimous decision after 12 rounds.

== Professional boxing record ==
39 fights	37 wins	2 losses
By knockout	25	2
By decision	12	0

No.	Result	Record	Opponent	Type	Round, time	Date	Location	Notes
39	Win	37–2	Sergei Melis	KO	5 (8), 2:11	17 Jul 2015	ACCO International Exhibition Center, Kyiv, Ukraine	
38	Win	36–2	Laszlo Toth	UD	8	22 Nov 2014	TEC Terminal Ice Arena, Brovary, Ukraine	
37	Win	35–2	Vitaliy Charkin	TKO	2 (8), 2:48	24 Jan 2014	Druzhba Arena, Donetsk, Ukraine	
36	Loss	34–2	Kell Brook	TKO	4 (12), 2:57	26 Oct 2013	Sheffield Arena, Sheffield, England	
35	Win	34–1	Carlos Adán Jerez	TKO	4 (10), 2:50	24 Aug 2013	Donbass Arena, Donetsk, Ukraine	
34	Win	33–1	Ricky Hatton	KO	9 (10), 2:52	24 Nov 2012	Manchester Arena, Manchester, England	
33	Loss	32–1	Paulie Malignaggi	TKO	9 (12), 1:10	29 Apr 2012	Donbass Arena, Donetsk, Ukraine	Lost WBA welterweight title
32	Win	32–0	Marco Antonio Avendaño	TKO	6 (12), 2:38	26 Aug 2011	Donbass Arena, Donetsk, Ukraine	Retained WBA welterweight title
31	Win	31–0	Charlie Navarro	UD	12	30 Aug 2010	Lenin Square, Donetsk, Ukraine	Retained WBA welterweight title
30	Win	30–0	Motoki Sasaki	UD	12	3 Oct 2009	Druzhba Arena, Donetsk, Ukraine	Retained WBA (Regular) welterweight title
29	Win	29–0	Yuriy Nuzhnenko	UD	12	10 Apr 2009	Druzhba Arena, Donetsk, Ukraine	Won vacant WBA (Regular) welterweight title
28	Win	28–0	Adonisio Francisco Reges	TKO	4 (12), 1:57	29 Nov 2008	Druzhba Arena, Donetsk, Ukraine	Retained WBA Inter-Continental welterweight title
27	Win	27–0	Frederic Klose	UD	12	8 July 2008	Druzhba Arena, Donetsk, Ukraine	Retained WBA Inter-Continental welterweight title
26	Win	26–0	Stuart Elwell	TKO	2 (12)	25 Mar 2008	Druzhba Arena, Donetsk, Ukraine	Retained WBA Inter-Continental welterweight title
25	Win	25–0	Viktor Sydorenko	TKO	3 (12)	15 Dec 2007	Druzhba Arena, Donetsk, Ukraine	Retained European Union External welterweight title; Won vacant WBA Inter-Continental welterweight title
24	Win	24–0	Safo Boboradjabov	TKO	5 (8)	19 Oct 2007	Sergey Bubka School of Olympic Reserve, Donetsk, Ukraine	
23	Win	23–0	Zoran Didanovic	KO	1 (12)	21 Aug 2007	Lenin Square, Donetsk, Ukraine	Retained European Union External welterweight title
22	Win	22–0	Volodymyr Khodakovskyy	UD	12	17 Apr 2007	State Circus, Donetsk, Ukraine	Retained European Union External welterweight title
21	Win	21–0	Andrey Yeskin	KO	6 (12)	9 Mar 2007	Druzhba Arena, Donetsk, Ukraine	Retained European Union External welterweight title
20	Win	20–0	Giorgi Ungiadze	UD	12	23 Dec 2006	Druzhba Arena, Donetsk, Ukraine	Won vacant European Union External welterweight title
19	Win	19–0	Vincenzo Finzi	KO	2 (8)	4 Nov 2006	Salle des Etoiles, Monte Carlo, Monaco	
18	Win	18–0	Stephane Benito	TKO	7 (12), 0:30	21 Jul 2006	Druzhba Arena, Donetsk, Ukraine	Retained IBF International welterweight title
17	Win	17–0	Assan Seksenbayev	UD	12	28 Feb 2006	Druzhba Arena, Donetsk, Ukraine	Won vacant IBF International welterweight title
16	Win	16–0	Sergey Zemnevich	UD	8	3 Dec 2005	Sports Palace Yunost, Donetsk, Ukraine	
15	Win	15–0	Arthur Nowak	KO	2 (12)	10 Sep 2005	Druzhba Arena, Donetsk, Ukraine	Won vacant IBF Inter-Continental welterweight title
14	Win	14–0	Denys Zhyvilo	KO	2 (10)	29 Jun 2005	Druzhba Arena, Donetsk, Ukraine	
13	Win	13–0	Oleg Krutko	TKO	3 (8), 1:17	22 May 2005	Sergey Bubka School of Olympic Reserve, Donetsk, Ukraine	
12	Win	12–0	Brice Faradji	UD	12	14 Jan 2005	Druzhba Arena, Donetsk, Ukraine	Retained IBF Inter-Continental welterweight title
11	Win	11–0	Cesar Alberto Leiva	UD	12	22 Sep 2004	Druzhba Arena, Donetsk, Ukraine	Retained IBF Inter-Continental welterweight title
10	Win	10–0	Bagaza Mwambene	TKO	4 (12)	23 Jun 2004	Druzhba Arena, Donetsk, Ukraine	Retained IBF Inter-Continental welterweight title
9	Win	9–0	Aliaksandr Shnip	RTD	3 (12), 3:00	8 Apr 2004	Druzhba Arena, Donetsk, Ukraine	Won vacant IBF Inter-Continental welterweight title
8	Win	8–0	Artur Drinaj	KO	2 (8), 2:40	12 Dec 2003	Druzhba Arena, Donetsk, Ukraine	
7	Win	7–0	Evgeny Ershov	KO	1 (10)	12 Sep 2003	Sports Palace Yunost, Donetsk, Ukraine	Retained WBC–CISBB welterweight title
6	Win	6–0	Batyr Bekov	KO	3 (8), 0:48	1 Jul 2003	Sports Palace Yunost, Donetsk, Ukraine	
5	Win	5–0	Dzmitri Kashkan	TKO	8 (10)	22 Feb 2003	Circus, Kharkiv, Ukraine	Retained WBC–CISBB welterweight title
4	Win	4–0	Yuriy Tsybenko	TKO	6 (10)	21 Dec 2002	Yubileyny Sports Palace, St. Petersburg, Russia	Won vacant WBC–CISBB welterweight title
3	Win	3–0	Tigran Saribekyan	TKO	1 (6), 2:45	29 Nov 2002	Circus, Kharkiv, Ukraine	
2	Win	2–0	Mukhamed Shikov	UD	6	5 Oct 2002	Druzhba Arena, Donetsk, Ukraine	
1	Win	1–0	Abdumanon Qurbonov	TKO	2 (4)	15 Jun 2002	Druzhba Arena, Donetsk, Ukraine	

Sporting positions
Regional boxing titles
Vacant Title last held by Maxim Nesterenko	WBC–CISBB welterweight champion 21 December 2002 – April 2004; Vacated	Vacant Title next held by Rozalin Nasibulin
Vacant Title last held by Sergey Stepkin	IBF Inter-Continental welterweight champion 8 April 2004 – April 2005; Vacated	Vacant Title next held by Luciano Abis
Vacant Title last held by Luciano Abis	IBF Inter-Continental welterweight champion 10 September 2005 – January 2006; Vacated	Vacant Title next held by Cristian De Martinis
Vacant Title last held by Michele Orlando	IBF International welterweight champion 28 February 2006 – March 2006; Vacated	Vacant Title next held by Giammario Grassellini
Vacant Title last held by Giammario Grassellini	IBF International welterweight champion 21 July 2006 – August 2006; Vacated	Vacant Title next held by Emanuele Della Rosa
New title	European Union External welterweight champion 23 December 2006 – March 2008; Vacated	Vacant Title next held by Alexey Evchenko
Vacant Title last held by Yuriy Nuzhnenko	WBA Inter-Continental welterweight champion 15 December 2007 – 10 April 2009; Won world title	Vacant Title next held by Stefano Castellucci
World boxing titles
Preceded by Yuriy Nuzhnenko	WBA (Regular) welterweight champion 10 April 2009 – 21 May 2010	Vacant Title next held by Keith Thurman
Preceded by Shane Mosley	WBA welterweight champion 21 May 2010 – 29 April 2012	Succeeded by Paulie Malignaggi
