= Ricky Hatton =

British professional boxer (1978–2025)

Ricky Hatton MBE
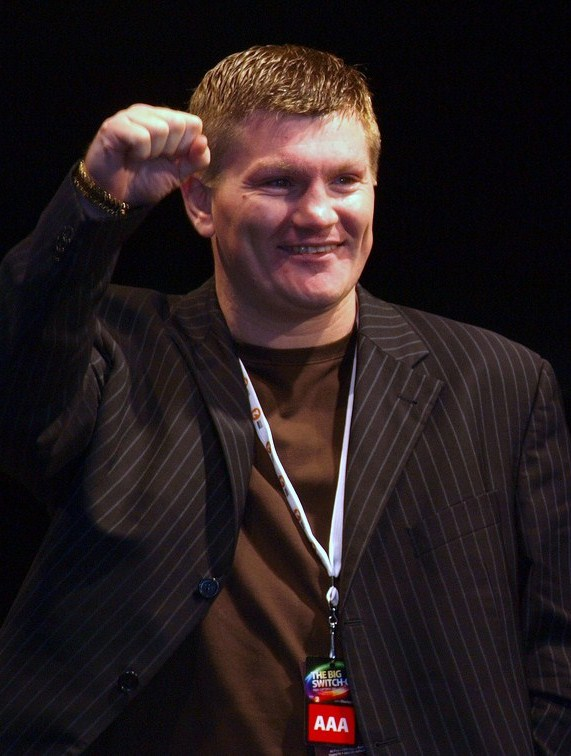
- Hatton in 2009

Personal information
- Nicknames: The Hitman; The Manchester Mexican; The Pride of Hyde; The People's Champion
- Born: Richard John Hatton; 6 October 1978 Stockport, Greater Manchester, England
- Died: c. 14 September 2025 (aged 46) Gee Cross, Hyde, England
- Height: 5 ft 6 in (168 cm)
- Weight: Light welterweight; Welterweight
- Ricky Hatton's voice First published 30 May 2022

Boxing career
- Reach: 65 in (165 cm)
- Stance: Orthodox

Boxing record
- Total fights: 48
- Wins: 45
- Win by KO: 32
- Losses: 3

Richard John Hatton (6 October 1978 – c. 14 September 2025), also known by nicknames such as "the Hitman", "the Pride of Hyde" and the "People's Champion", was a British professional boxer who competed between 1997 and 2012, and later worked as a boxing promoter and trainer. During his boxing career, he held multiple world championships in the light-welterweight division, and one at welterweight. In 2005 he was named Fighter of the Year by The Ring magazine, the Boxing Writers Association of America, ESPN, and BoxingScene.

In 2000 Hatton won the British light welterweight title, followed by the World Boxing Union (WBU) title the following year; he made a record fifteen successful defences of the latter from 2001 to 2004. He reached the pinnacle of his career in 2005 by defeating Kostya Tszyu for the International Boxing Federation (IBF), Ring and lineal titles. This was followed up later that year with a victory over Carlos Maussa to claim the World Boxing Association (WBA) title (Super version), thereby becoming a unified light-welterweight world champion.

Making his welterweight debut in 2006, Hatton won a tough fight against WBA champion Luis Collazo to win a world title in his second weight class. A return to light welterweight in 2007 saw him win the vacant IBF title for a second time, as well as the International Boxing Organization (IBO) title. In the same year, Hatton had his career-first defeat against Floyd Mayweather Jr. in an attempt to win the World Boxing Council (WBC), Ring and lineal welterweight titles. This defeat took a severe toll on Hatton's wellbeing, as did a second defeat in 2009 when he lost his IBO, Ring and lineal light welterweight titles to Manny Pacquiao.

After Hatton's career was put on a long hiatus, rumours of a comeback continued to circulate in the media over the next several years. In 2011, Hatton announced his retirement from the sport, but in 2012, more than three years after his last fight, he confirmed his comeback. A loss to Vyacheslav Senchenko in his first match back prompted Hatton to immediately announce his final retirement. He remained retired for 13 years before announcing a comeback in July 2025. Hatton died before he could make his ring return.

Hatton was lauded as one of the most beloved and popular British boxers of all time, with a raucous fan base that travelled in their tens of thousands across the Atlantic to support him. He was inducted into the International Boxing Hall of Fame as part of the class of 2024.

== Early life ==
Richard John Hatton was born on 6 October 1978 in Stockport, Greater Manchester. He grew up in a pub on the Hattersley council estate in Hyde. He first trained at the Sale West ABC (Racecourse Estate). He was educated at Hattersley High School. His grandfather and his father both played football for Rochdale and Hatton had a trial for the youth team. He found a local boxing club in Hyde to train at. Aged 14, Ricky Hatton was taken by his uncles Ged and Paul to Manchester United's Old Trafford stadium to watch the second fight between Nigel Benn and Chris Eubank. On leaving school he joined the family carpet business, but after he cut four of his fingers with a Stanley knife, his father made him a salesman to prevent him from losing his fingers.

== Amateur career ==
Hatton had a short amateur career, in which he won seven British titles and represented his country at the 1996 AIBA Youth World Boxing Championships. His elimination in the semi-finals caused controversy. Four of the five judges awarded the contest to Hatton, but under the scoring rules Hatton was defeated as the fifth judge gave the match to Hatton's opponent by 16 points. The judge was later found to have accepted a bribe, and disillusioned with the amateur governing bodies, Hatton turned professional, aged 18. Hatton was based at Billy "The Preacher" Graham's gym in Moss Side in Manchester, where fellow boxers included Carl Thompson and Michael Gomez.

== Professional career ==
=== Light-welterweight ===
==== Early career ====
Hatton made his professional debut on 11 September 1997 against Colin McAuley in Widnes at Kingsway Leisure Centre. Hatton won by a technical knockout (TKO) in the first round, while in his second fight he boxed at Madison Square Garden in New York, as part of the undercard to Naseem Hamed vs. Kevin Kelley. Soon he was fighting on the undercard of contests involving major British boxers, such as the two WBO cruiserweight title fights between Carl Thompson and Chris Eubank in 1998. In 1999 the British Boxing Writers' Club named Hatton their Young Boxer of the Year. His first international title came in May 1999, when he defeated Dillon Carew for the WBO inter-continental light-welterweight title.

Hatton's next four fights after gaining the WBO inter-continental belt were all won within four rounds. He then gained the WBA Inter-Continental title following a unification bout against Giuseppe Lauri. The following month he fought Jon Thaxton for the vacant British title. Despite sustaining a cut over his left eye in the first round, Hatton continued for the full twelve rounds and won on points, the first time in his career that he had been taken beyond six rounds. As the cut was his fourth above the same eye, Hatton had plastic surgery on his eyebrow that November, with a view to a world title shot in the spring. Hatton claimed the vacant WBU title in March 2001, having sent opponent Tony Pep to the canvas three times in the process.

==== Hatton vs. Tszyu ====
On 5 June 2005, Hatton defeated IBF and The Ring champion Kostya Tszyu, then widely regarded as one of the top pound-for-pound boxers in the world, by a TKO after the Australian failed to answer the bell for the twelfth round. Hatton was a heavy underdog for this fight and the victory announced his entry to the upper echelons of the world boxing scene. Prior to the fight, the majority of boxing critics had given Hatton little or no chance and this victory was regarded as one of the best victories by an English boxer in the last 20 years.

==== Light Welterweight Unification ====
On 26 November 2005, Hatton won the WBA light-welterweight title when he defeated Carlos Maussa in the ninth round of a unification bout. In December, Hatton was named the 2005 Ring Magazine Fighter of the Year.

Hatton relinquished his IBF title on 29 March 2006 after refusing to fulfil a mandatory defence against number one contender Naoufel Ben Rabah because he intended to move up to the welterweight division. Hatton signed a three-fight contract with Dennis Hobson's fight academy after splitting from long time promoter Frank Warren.

=== Welterweight ===
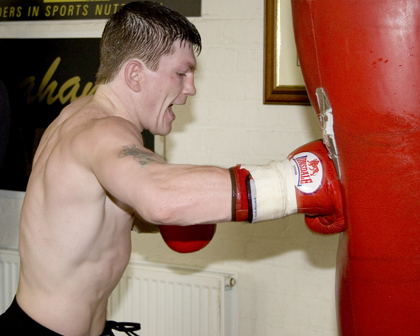
Hatton training in 2006

==== Hatton vs. Collazo ====
Hatton moved up a division to meet American Luis Collazo for the WBA welterweight title which took place on 13 May 2006. Hatton won the WBA title from Collazo but struggled. Hatton started well, knocking Collazo down in the very first few seconds of the first round, but it turned out to be one of the toughest fights of his career, with some boxing analysts claiming Collazo won the fight, although many thought Hatton had done enough early on to secure victory, with the knockdown a pivotal point in the fight.

=== Return to light-welterweight ===
==== Hatton vs. Urango ====
Hatton's first fight back at light-welterweight was against then IBF light-welterweight champion Juan Urango for his title and the vacant IBO title on 20 January 2007 in Las Vegas, Nevada. Hatton's promoter, Dennis Hobson, stated that the impetus for moving back down was to set up a fight with José Luis Castillo, a fighter who nearly beat Floyd Mayweather Jr. at lightweight in 2002. Hatton ended up winning a twelve-round unanimous decision (UD) against Urango to re-capture the IBF light-welterweight title. He won all but one round on all three judges' scorecards. Castillo, who was on the undercard, also won, setting up their long-awaited fight.

==== Hatton vs. Castillo ====
Hatton was forced to relinquish his IBF title again on 10 February to be able to fight Castillo. The fight was held on 23 June 2007, at the Thomas & Mack Center in Paradise, Nevada. In round four, Hatton landed a "perfect" left hook to the liver, which put Castillo to the canvas. Hatton later said that four of Castillo's ribs were broken with this one punch. Unable to stand up, Castillo was counted out for the first time in his career.

=== Return to welterweight ===
==== Hatton vs. Mayweather Jr. ====
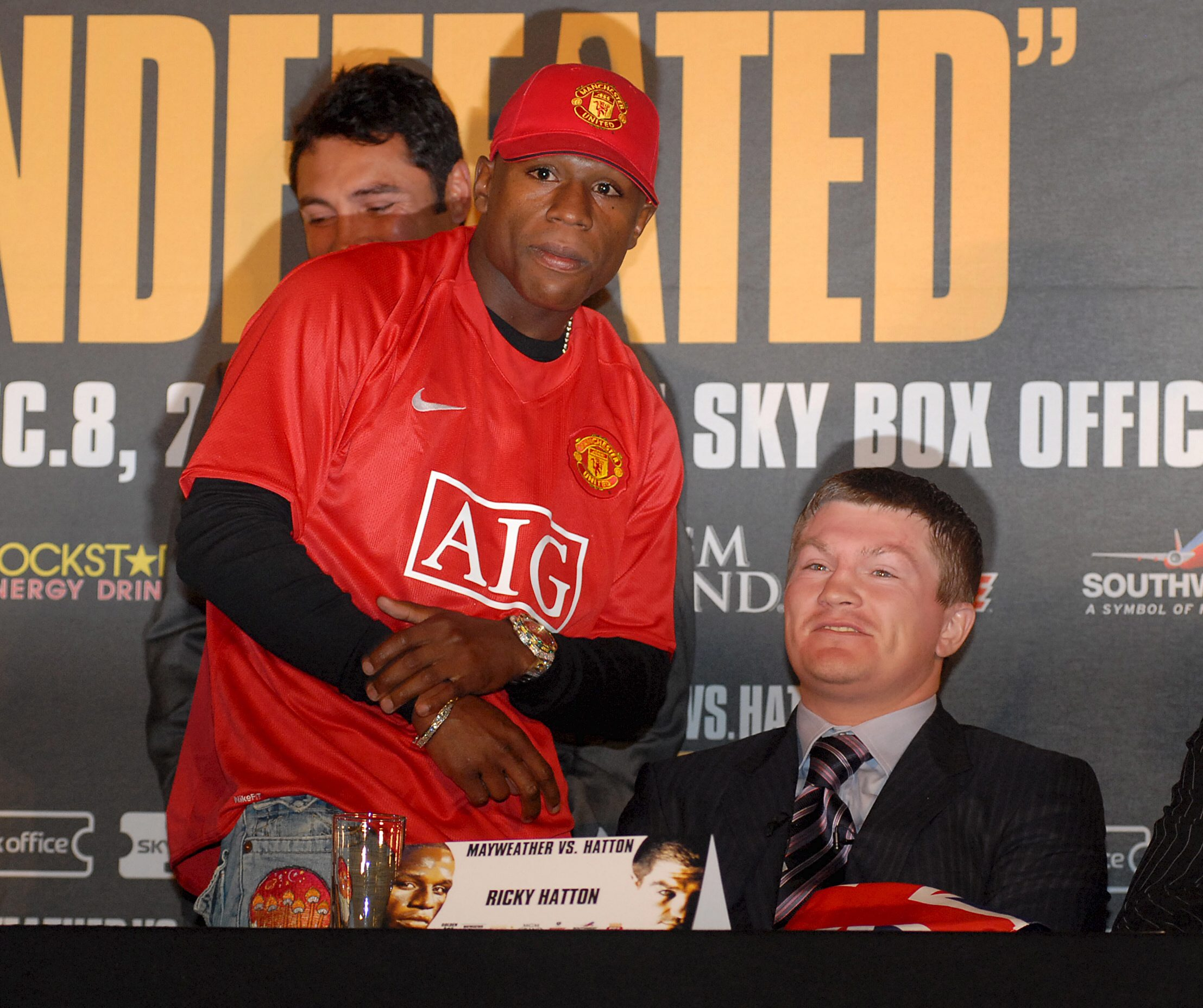
Hatton and Floyd Mayweather Jr., 2007

Hatton agreed to terms on 27 July for an 8 December 2007 welterweight fight with Floyd Mayweather Jr. which was considered to be the biggest welterweight fight since the 1999 clash between Oscar De La Hoya and Tito Trinidad. The MGM Grand Garden Arena in Las Vegas was announced as the venue on 17 August 2007. The fight was agreed to less than three months after Mayweather had said he planned to retire following a victory over Oscar De La Hoya. Hatton was able to bring the fight to Mayweather in the early rounds. In the 1st round, Hatton caught Mayweather with a left jab which knocked Mayweather off balance. His constant pressure appeared to make Mayweather uncomfortable at first. In the third round, Mayweather landed a right that cut Hatton above the right eye.

In round six, referee Joe Cortez took a point away from Hatton after he appeared to hit Mayweather on the back of the head while Mayweather was rested between the ropes. However, the punch was revealed to have hit the rope rather than Mayweather's head, but Hatton was warned for punching behind the head on numerous occasions before the deduction. Hatton became infuriated at the referee's decision to deduct a point and turned his back on him. Hatton later said he was angered by the referee, which caused him to lose his calm and contributed to his downfall. Hatton was able to hold his own until round eight, when Mayweather began to adapt to Hatton and started counterattacking. Mayweather knocked Hatton down to the mat in round ten. Hatton got up, but Mayweather quickly resumed his attack, resulting in Joe Cortez putting a stop to the fight and Hatton's corner threw in the towel. Official scorecards read 88–82, 89–81, and 89–81 at the time of stoppage, all in favour of Mayweather.

=== Second return to light-welterweight ===
==== Hatton vs. Lazcano ====
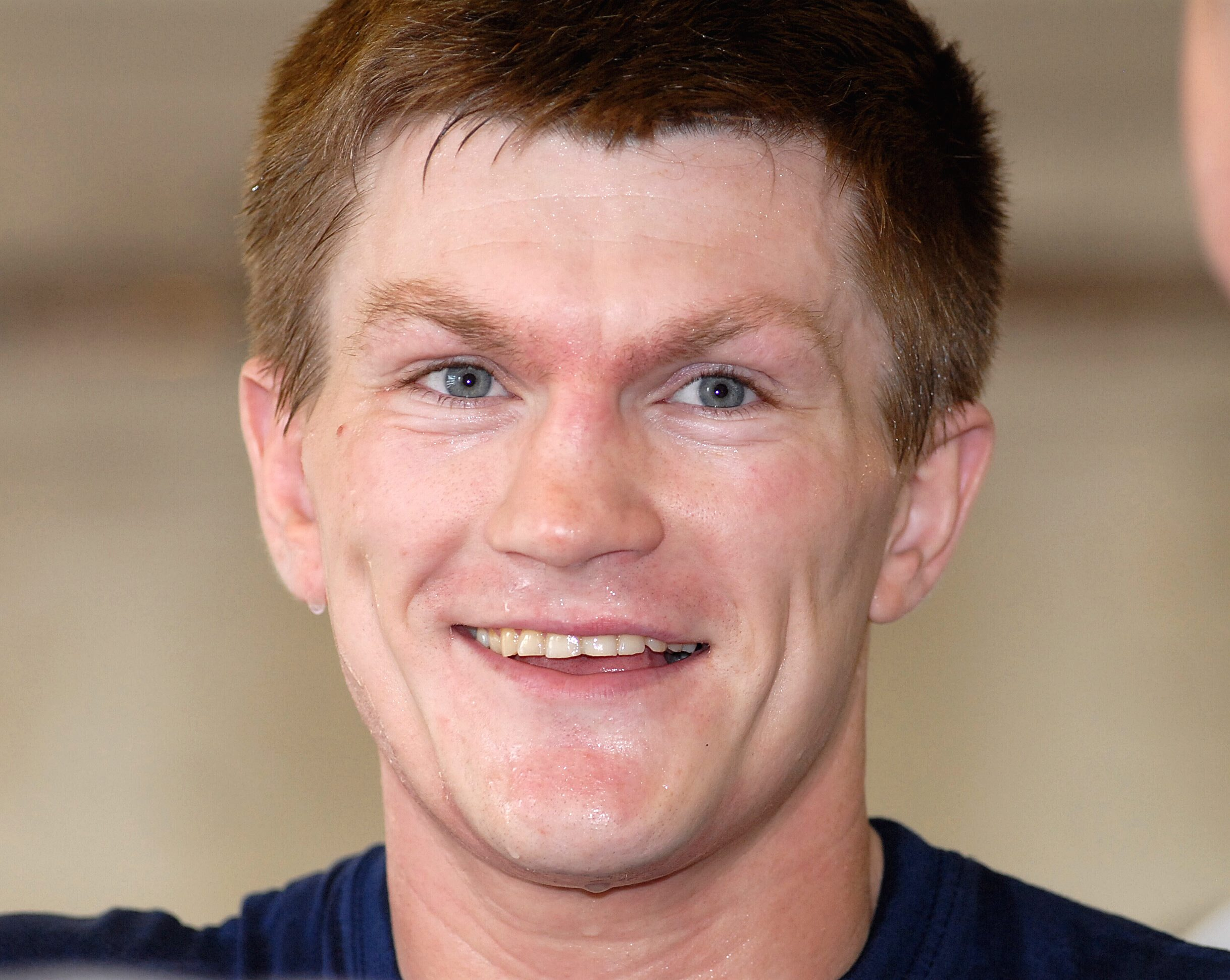
Hatton in 2008

On 24 May 2008, Hatton beat Mexican Juan Lazcano by UD with scores of 120–110, 118–110, and 120–108, in front of his home crowd of 55,000 (a post-World War II record for a boxing match in Britain), at City of Manchester Stadium to retain The Ring and IBO light-welterweight titles. Hatton did well when he boxed and controlled the range, utilising his jab and dominating a lot of the early exchanges. In round eight, Hatton absorbed a left hook to the chin that wobbled him. In round ten, Hatton was hurt again by a left hook. Despite that, Hatton outworked Lazcano to win at least ten of the rounds.

==== Hatton vs. Malignaggi ====
Hatton fought Paulie Malignaggi of the United States at the MGM Grand Garden Arena on 22 November 2008 for Hatton's The Ring light-welterweight title. He was trained for the fight by Floyd Mayweather Sr. Hatton dominated for all of the fight and defeated Malignaggi by eleventh-round TKO when Malignaggi's trainer, Buddy McGirt, threw in the towel 48 seconds into the round.

==== Hatton vs. Pacquiao ====
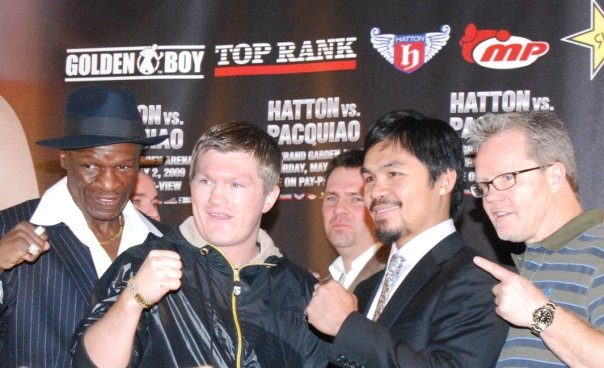
Hatton with his trainer Floyd Mayweather Sr. (left), Manny Pacquiao (second from right) and Freddie Roach, 2009

Hatton fought Manny Pacquiao on 2 May 2009 at the MGM Grand Garden Arena in Las Vegas. The fight was at light-welterweight, which was the sixth weight category Pacquiao has fought at and is the weight at which Hatton was previously undefeated. Pacquiao defeated Hatton in the second round by a KO victory after knocking Hatton down twice in the first round, and then a final time in the second round. Following the loss to Pacquiao, Hatton put his career on hiatus. After more than a year out of action, in a June 2010 interview with Gulfnews.com, the British boxer seemed uninterested in coming to the ring again. He stated: "Boxing started off as a habit and it ended up giving me some money and making me a little bit of a better person. But I don't think I will have a fight again. But you can never say never as I have not announced officially that I won't be boxing. At the moment I don't have any fire in the belly for a fight or to get myself to a gym." However, Hatton also added: "But it has been only 13 months and I am only 31, so never count me out."

Hatton also voiced suspicion that Pacquiao might have been using performance-enhancing drugs (PEDs). Hatton said he should have made the same blood testing demand as Floyd Mayweather Jr., whose fight against Pacquiao fell through in early 2010. However, the Nevada Athletic Commission (NAC) cited a medical analysis which supported Pacquiao's decision to abstain from blood testing similar to that demanded by Mayweather, stating that drawing blood close to a fight may cause "hematomas, infections or other injuries." Hatton also admitted that he underestimated Pacquiao and that "it could be that he is just a great fighter who has improved."

=== Comeback at welterweight ===
==== Hatton vs. Senchenko ====
On 14 September 2012, Hatton confirmed he would return to professional boxing with a fight against an unnamed opponent scheduled to take place in November that year. Tickets for the comeback sold out in two days, before the opponent or undercard were announced. His opponent was later revealed to be Vyacheslav Senchenko. Having reached a maximum weight of nearly 15 stone (95 kg), in the months leading up to his comeback, Hatton underwent a significant weight transformation. He reduced his weight from 15 stone 6 pounds (approximately 98 kg) to 10 stone 7 pounds (67 kg) to meet the welterweight limit for his fight.

Hatton started the fight the stronger of the pair, but did not time his shots well. Senchenko used his superior reach to land jabs, and gained the upper hand as the fight progressed. In the ninth round, a left hook to the body sent Hatton to the floor. Knocked down by the type of punch previously viewed as his own signature, Hatton was counted out by the referee. It was the third time Hatton had been stopped, taking his overall record to 45 wins and 3 defeats. He announced his final retirement from the ring immediately afterwards, saying "I needed one more fight to see if I had still got it – and I haven't. I found out tonight it isn't there no more."

=== Planned final comeback ===
On 6 July 2025, Hatton announced that he was coming out of retirement at the age of 46. The fight was to take place in Dubai, United Arab Emirates on 2 December 2025 against 46-year-old Eisa Al Dah (8–3, 4 KOs). Speaking on the comeback, Hatton said: "I'm very much looking forward to it myself. What you're trying to do there for boxing in Dubai is fantastic. Hopefully this will be a spinoff for more events for you to have over there and hopefully we can get the ball rolling with a bang." The fight was announced via a virtual face-off, as Hatton was unable to travel due to injury. Al Dah, who was also the promoter, had not fought since 2021, when he was stopped by Mexican journeyman Pedro Delgado in the first round.

== Outside the ring ==
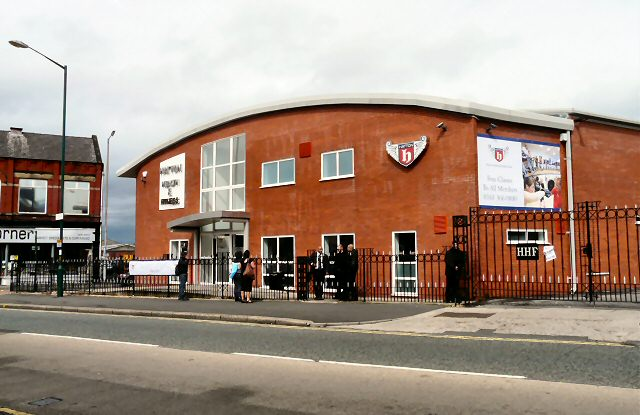
Hatton Health and Fitness – Hatton's gym in his home town of Hyde, Tameside

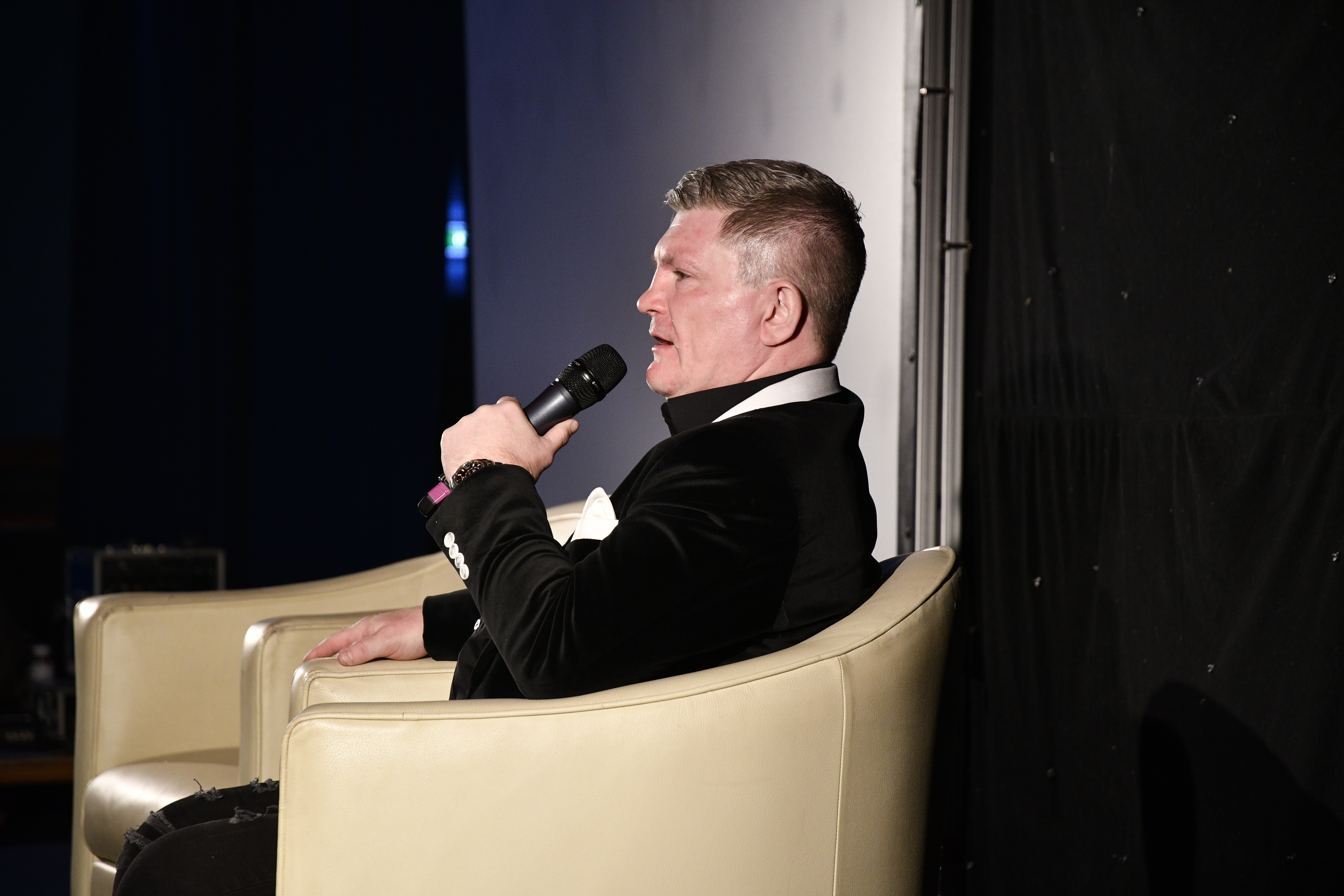
Hatton speaking at an event in Staines-upon-Thames, Surrey, 2024

Hatton was a passionate supporter of Manchester City and once had a trial at City for the youth team. His entrance music was the club's song "Blue Moon" as performed by the band "Supra".

Regarding his nickname, Hatton said, "I've always been a fan of Tommy Hearns, and everybody associates that that's where I got it from, but everybody's a Tommy Hearns fan. I got the nickname the first day I walked in the gym. I was 10 years old and put a pair of gloves on and started walloping the bag, and my amateur coach said, "Look at him, look how evil he is. He's a little Hitman."

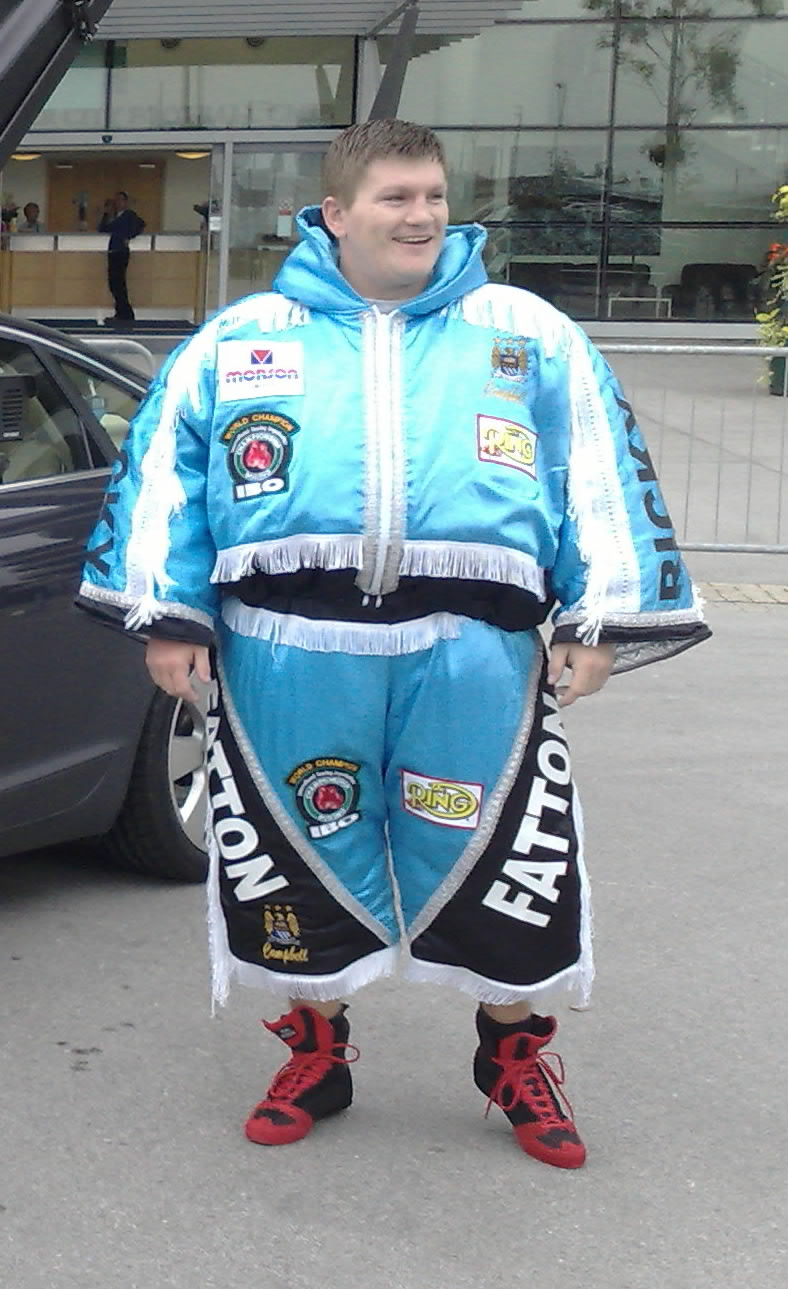
Hatton parodying himself as "Ricky Fatton", 2008

Hatton was sometimes referred to by boxing fans as "Ricky Fatton" because he was known to allow himself to weigh as much as 175 to 180 pounds (35 to 40 pounds over his fight weight) when not in training for a fight. Since turning professional, Hatton opted to eat a full English breakfast before fights – his favourite place in Hyde was The Butty Box in Mottram Road, where he was interviewed by Gabby Logan for Inside Sport; and was known to drink Guinness on Thursday nights when he played darts for the New Inn. Experts used his ill-balanced diet, akin to Jake LaMotta's ballooning up between fights, to explain his poor performances in later fights and his tendency to tire towards the end of fights. Hatton appeared on ITV's daytime show Loose Women in August 2007, stating that the reason he put on weight between fights was because "I have a lot on my plate at the moment."

Hatton appeared on the Friday Night with Jonathan Ross show in March 2007. Interviewed on ITV1's Parkinson on 13 October 2007, at the beginning of the interview, Hatton handed Michael Parkinson a custom-made pair of boxing shorts with "Mike" and "Parky" written on them. The shorts had the Barnsley emblem on them and were coloured red and blue, Barnsley Football Club's colours, because Parkinson was a Barnsley fan. While talking about Floyd Mayweather's arrogance, Hatton said: "If there's such a thing as reincarnation, Floyd will come back as himself."

Hatton received the MBE for services to sport in the 2007 New Year Honours.

In 2008, he started hosting his own live chat show called Ricky Speaks, on Nuts TV. His father, Ray Hatton, said, "We had a conversation with a third party asking whether, if we were approached by the Mayweather team, would a possible rematch be on the cards." Ray Hatton added, "Really, at the moment we're looking at Manny Pacquiao. It's very nice for Ricky to still be in such a big league."

Hatton hosted the 9 November 2009 edition of WWE Raw at the Sheffield Arena, defeating professional wrestler Chavo Guerrero Jr. in a match.

On 13 September 2010, Hatton was admitted to a rehabilitation facility, The Priory, in Roehampton, southwest London, for substance abuse to tackle a drink and clinical depression problem. He was caught on camera apparently snorting Class A drugs, cocaine, in a Manchester hotel room. Doctors said they were more worried about his clinical depression and alcohol abuse than drug use. Hatton sought medical help two weeks prior after news emerged about a night out where he drank eleven pints of Guinness, vodka and sambuca during the night out with Emma Bowe, 29, the Irish national senior women's boxing champion.

In December 2016, Hatton said that he had tried to kill himself on several occasions due to depression, stating: "I was coming off the rails with my drinking and that led to drugs. It was like a runaway train."

In January 2024, Hatton competed in the sixteenth series of the ITV skating competition Dancing on Ice. He was paired with professional skater Robin Johnstone, and the pair were the first couple to be eliminated after losing the skate-off to Lou Sanders and Brendyn Hatfield. He subsequently began a relationship with fellow contestant, actress Claire Sweeney, however they split later in December of that year.

In 2023 a documentary made by Dan Dewsbury, entitled Hatton, was released exclusively on Sky TV. It explored Hatton's career, focusing especially on his relationship with trainer Billy Graham. Well received by both audiences and critics, the programme was nominated in 2024 for the BAFTA in the Single Documentary category.

=== Family ===
As of 2008, Hatton's mother, Carol, still worked on the carpet stall on Glossop Market in the Peak District. His father, Ray, was his manager, and manages Hatton's brother and fellow boxer Matthew Hatton. Ricky Hatton and his girlfriend, Jennifer Dooley, lived in his house, the Heartbreak Hotel, named after his favourite artist, Elvis Presley, in Hyde.

Hatton was estranged from his parents for several years due to a dispute about money. In his autobiography War and Peace: My Story, Hatton said that his father punched him in the face during a confrontation in a car park in 2012. The family feud was healed in 2019.

Hatton had three children. Hatton's son Campbell, born in 2001, was conceived after a short reconciliation with ex-girlfriend Claire. Hatton set up a trust fund to make sure his son was always provided for and saw him every day. He had two daughters with Dooley: Millie and Fearne.

Campbell pursued a career in professional boxing. During his boxing career, Campbell was trained by Ricky's brother, Matthew. However, during an interview in July 2025, Hatton confirmed his son's retirement from boxing.

On 12 September 2010, the Sunday tabloid News of the World published a front-page story alleging Hatton had been a regular cocaine user with accompanying pictures showing the boxer apparently using the drug. Hatton was said to be "devastated" following the story.

=== Charity ===
Ricky became an Ambassador for suicide prevention charity Campaign Against Living Miserably (CALM) in 2023.

In December 2013, Hatton became the patron of Manchester-based Christian charity Barnabus that offers support to homeless and vulnerable people through its drop-in centre.

=== Fans ===
Hatton attracted many fans who were very vocal in their support during fights. The main chant was a modified version of the Christmas song "Winter Wonderland", with the lyrics changed to promote Hatton.

Along with Floyd Mayweather, Hatton is referenced by the American rapper GZA on the track "Paper Plate" off of his fifth studio album, Pro Tools (2008).

=== Hatton Promotions ===
Hatton operated his own boxing promotions company, Hatton Promotions, which managed a number of fighters including Anthony Upton, Sonny Upton, Paul Upton, Lucas Browne, Cameron Hammond, Damien Hooper, Zhanat Zhakiyanov, Adam Etches, Matty Askin, Scott Jenkins, Sergey Rabchenko and Ryan Burnett. On 11 February 2017, Zhakiyanov became the first fighter under Hatton Promotions, as well as trained by Hatton, to become world champion when he defeated Rau'shee Warren by split decision (SD) to win the WBA bantamweight title.

== Training career ==
Hatton was a boxing manager and trainer. He was the trainer of Nathan Gorman who is the great nephew of the Welsh bare-knuckle boxer Bartley Gorman, Zhanat Zhakiyanov, and Irish champion Paul Upton. Hatton was also the trainer of Tommy Fury, the younger brother of Tyson Fury, and was in the corner of Tyson for his fight against Deontay Wilder in 2018. On 1 December 2023, Hatton guided Chloe Watson to a unanimous decision win over Justine Lallemand to claim the vacant European female flyweight title.

== Death and funeral ==
Hatton was last seen on 12 September 2025, and he failed to attend a scheduled event on 13 September. His body was discovered at his home, 19 Bowlacre Road in Gee Cross on the morning of 14 September by his manager and keyholder, Paul Speak, whose intention had been to accompany Hatton to Manchester Airport for his scheduled flight to a press conference in Dubai, regarding his planned December comeback fight.

Hatton's funeral took place at midday on 10 October at Manchester Cathedral following a public procession through Greater Manchester. The route, which had been published in advance, drew large crowds and began in Hyde and passed through several landmarks that were significant to him during his lifetime. The procession was preceded by Hatton's cherished 'Trotters' Reliant Regal Van from Only Fools and Horses, which he owned and would often drive around his hometown. Following the service, the cortège made a final stop at the Etihad Stadium, where Hatton had long supported Manchester City.

At the opening of the inquest into Hatton's death at Stockport Coroner's Court on 16 October, senior coroner Alison Mutch said they are awaiting the final cause of death, but it was indicated as hanging. The inquest was adjourned until 20 March 2026.

On 20 March 2026, in Stockport, the coroner, Alison Mutch said while she was "satisfied that Hatton had carried out the acts which led to his death [she] could not be sure he intended to take his own life." A narrative verdict was recorded, as a verdict of suicide by hanging would be unlawful, given the circumstances. There was evidence of Hatton's previous use of cocaine and cannabis, but not in the hours before his death. Hatton was, however, over twice the legal drink-drive limit, and his brain showed signs of mild chronic traumatic encephalopathy, often associated with boxing.

=== Tributes ===
Manager and promoter Frank Warren and several former world champions, including Tyson Fury, Anthony Joshua, Manny Pacquiao, Amir Khan and his idol Roberto Durán, paid tribute. On 22 September, Tameside Council initiated a book of condolence at Hyde Town Hall. The Civic Mayor, Councillor Shibley Alam, was the first to sign the book the week prior. Once completed, it would be presented to Hatton's family.

On the afternoon of 14 September, Manchester City and Manchester United observed a minute of appreciation before they played their Premier League game. With Hatton being a City supporter, Phil Foden dedicated their 3–0 win to him, saying that he had "extra motivation going into the game" and "the lads gave everything".

On 27 September, prior to Manchester City's home game against Burnley, the club and fans again paid tribute to Hatton. A large banner depicting the boxer was unfurled by home supporters in the South Stand. The display, organised by fan group 1894, showed Hatton in the ring wearing City branded shorts next to the words "The People's Champion". There was also a banner installed on the third tier of the East Stand reading "There's only one Ricky Hatton", which is now a permanent fixture in the Etihad Stadium. Members of Hatton's family, including son, Campbell, his two daughters and granddaughter, attended the game. A silhouette of Hatton was also shown on the big screens inside as City supporters sang "Blue Moon" ahead of kick-off.

On 27 and 28 September, Oasis dedicated their song "Live Forever" to Hatton, at their concerts at Wembley Stadium. Richard Ashcroft, who was performing as one of the band's supporting acts, also dedicated "Bittersweet Symphony" to Hatton.

On 7 June 2026, a tribute event titled "An Evening4Ricky" was held at the AO Arena in Manchester to celebrate his life and legacy. The show featured musicians, comedians, boxers and other public figures, and was structured as 12 "rounds" of entertainment reflecting different aspects of Hatton's life and career. The event also raised funds and awareness for mental health causes through the Ricky Hatton Foundation and partner charities.

== Professional boxing record ==
48 fights	45 wins	3 losses
By knockout	32	3
By decision	12	0
By disqualification	1	0

No.	Result	Record	Opponent	Type	Round, time	Date	Location	Notes
48	Loss	45–3	Vyacheslav Senchenko	KO	9 (10), 2:52	24 Nov 2012	Manchester Arena, Manchester, England	
47	Loss	45–2	Manny Pacquiao	KO	2 (12), 2:59	2 May 2009	MGM Grand Garden Arena, Paradise, US	Lost IBO and The Ring light-welterweight titles
46	Win	45–1	Paulie Malignaggi	TKO	11 (12), 0:48	22 Nov 2008	MGM Grand Garden Arena, Paradise, US	Retained IBO and The Ring light-welterweight titles
45	Win	44–1	Juan Lazcano	UD	12	24 May 2008	City Stadium, Manchester, England	Retained IBO and The Ring light-welterweight titles
44	Loss	43–1	Floyd Mayweather Jr.	TKO	10 (12), 1:35	8 Dec 2007	MGM Grand Garden Arena, Paradise, US	For WBC and The Ring welterweight titles
43	Win	43–0	José Luis Castillo	KO	4 (12), 2:16	23 Jun 2007	Thomas & Mack Center, Paradise, US	Retained IBO and The Ring light-welterweight titles; Won vacant WBC International light-welterweight title
42	Win	42–0	Juan Urango	UD	12	20 Jan 2007	Paris, Paradise, US	Retained The Ring light-welterweight title; Won IBF and vacant IBO light-welterweight titles
41	Win	41–0	Luis Collazo	UD	12	13 May 2006	TD Garden, Boston, Massachusetts, US	Won WBA welterweight title
40	Win	40–0	Carlos Maussa	KO	9 (12), 1:10	26 Nov 2005	Hallam FM Arena, Sheffield, England	Retained IBF and The Ring light-welterweight titles; Won WBA (Unified) light-welterweight title
39	Win	39–0	Kostya Tszyu	RTD	11 (12), 3:00	4 Jun 2005	MEN Arena, Manchester, England	Won IBF and The Ring light-welterweight titles
38	Win	38–0	Ray Oliveira	KO	10 (12), 1:38	11 Dec 2004	ExCeL, London, England	Retained WBU light-welterweight title
37	Win	37–0	Michael Stewart	TKO	5 (12), 2:57	1 Oct 2004	MEN Arena, Manchester, England	Retained WBU light-welterweight title
36	Win	36–0	Carlos Wilfredo Vilches	UD	12	12 Jun 2004	MEN Arena, Manchester, England	Retained WBU light-welterweight title
35	Win	35–0	Dennis Holbæk Pedersen	TKO	6 (12), 2:32	3 Apr 2004	MEN Arena, Manchester, England	Retained WBU light-welterweight title
34	Win	34–0	Ben Tackie	UD	12	13 Dec 2003	MEN Arena, Manchester, England	Retained WBU light-welterweight title
33	Win	33–0	Aldo Nazareno Rios	RTD	9 (12), 3:00	27 Sep 2003	MEN Arena, Manchester, England	Retained WBU light-welterweight title
32	Win	32–0	Vince Phillips	UD	12	5 Apr 2003	MEN Arena, Manchester, England	Retained WBU light-welterweight title
31	Win	31–0	Joe Hutchinson	KO	4 (12), 1:16	14 Dec 2002	Telewest Arena, Newcastle, England	Retained WBU light-welterweight title
30	Win	30–0	Stephen Smith	DQ	2 (12), 0:28	28 Sep 2002	MEN Arena, Manchester, England	Retained WBU light-welterweight title; Smith disqualified after his cornermen entered the ring
29	Win	29–0	Eamonn Magee	UD	12	1 Jun 2002	MEN Arena, Manchester, England	Retained WBU light-welterweight title
28	Win	28–0	Mikhail Krivolapov	TKO	9 (12), 2:31	9 Feb 2002	MEN Arena, Manchester, England	Retained WBU light-welterweight title
27	Win	27–0	Justin Rowsell	TKO	2 (12), 0:36	15 Dec 2001	Wembley Conference Centre, London, England	Retained WBU light-welterweight title
26	Win	26–0	Freddie Pendleton	KO	2 (12), 2:40	27 Oct 2001	MEN Arena, Manchester, England	Retained WBU light-welterweight title
25	Win	25–0	John Bailey	TKO	5 (12), 0:36	15 Sep 2001	MEN Arena, Manchester, England	Retained WBU light-welterweight title
24	Win	24–0	Jason Rowland	KO	4 (12), 2:08	7 Jul 2001	Manchester Velodrome, Manchester, England	Retained WBU light-welterweight title
23	Win	23–0	Tony Pep	TKO	4 (12), 2:30	26 Mar 2001	Wembley Conference Centre, London, England	Won vacant WBU light-welterweight title
22	Win	22–0	Jon Thaxton	PTS	12	21 Oct 2000	Wembley Conference Centre, London, England	Won vacant British light-welterweight title
21	Win	21–0	Giuseppe Lauri	TKO	5 (12), 1:57	23 Sep 2000	York Hall, London, England	Retained WBO Inter-Continental light-welterweight title; Won WBA Inter-Continental light-welterweight title
20	Win	20–0	Gilbert Quiros	KO	2 (12), 1:48	10 Jun 2000	Fox Theatre, Detroit, US	Retained WBO Inter-Continental light-welterweight title
19	Win	19–0	Ambioris Figuero	TKO	4 (12), 0:49	16 May 2000	Spectrum Arena, Warrington, England	Retained WBO Inter-Continental light-welterweight title
18	Win	18–0	Pedro Alonso Teran	TKO	4 (12), 2:55	25 Mar 2000	Liverpool Olympia, Liverpool, England	Retained WBO Inter-Continental light-welterweight title
17	Win	17–0	Leoncio Garces	TKO	3 (8), 1:37	29 Jan 2000	MEN Arena, Manchester, England	
16	Win	16–0	Mark Winters	TKO	4 (12), 0:51	11 Dec 1999	Everton Park Sports Centre, Liverpool, England	Retained WBO Inter-Continental light-welterweight title
15	Win	15–0	Bernard Paul	RTD	4 (12), 3:00	9 Oct 1999	Bowlers Exhibition Centre, Manchester, England	Retained WBO Inter-Continental light-welterweight title
14	Win	14–0	Mark Ramsey	PTS	6	17 Jul 1999	The Dome Leisure Centre, Doncaster, England	
13	Win	13–0	Dillon Carew	TKO	5 (12), 2:00	29 May 1999	North Bridge Leisure Centre, Halifax, England	Won vacant WBO Inter-Continental light-welterweight title
12	Win	12–0	Brian Coleman	KO	2 (10), 1:18	3 Apr 1999	Royal Albert Hall, London, England	
11	Win	11–0	Tommy Peacock	TKO	2 (10), 2:21	27 Feb 1999	Sports Centre, Oldham, England	Won vacant Central Area light-welterweight title
10	Win	10–0	Paul Denton	TKO	6 (8), 0:19	19 Dec 1998	Everton Park Sports Centre, Liverpool, England	
9	Win	9–0	Kevin Carter	TKO	1 (6)	31 Oct 1998	Bally's Park Place, Atlantic City, US	
8	Win	8–0	Pascal Montulet	KO	2 (6)	19 Sep 1998	Arena Oberhausen, Oberhausen, Germany	
7	Win	7–0	Anthony Campbell	PTS	6	18 Jul 1998	Ponds Forge, Sheffield, England	
6	Win	6–0	Mark Ramsey	PTS	6	30 May 1998	Whitchurch Leisure Centre, Bristol, England	
5	Win	5–0	Karl Taylor	TKO	1 (6), 1:45	18 Apr 1998	MEN Arena, Manchester, England	
4	Win	4–0	Paul Salmon	TKO	1 (4), 1:47	27 Mar 1998	Ice Rink, Telford, England	
3	Win	3–0	David Thompson	TKO	1 (4), 1:25	17 Jan 1998	Whitchurch Leisure Centre, Bristol, England	
2	Win	2–0	Robbie Alvarez	UD	4	19 Dec 1997	Madison Square Garden, New York City, US	
1	Win	1–0	Colin McAuley	RTD	1 (4), 3:00	11 Sep 1997	Kingsway Leisure Centre, Widnes, England	

== Exhibition boxing record ==
1 fight	0 wins	0 losses
Non-scored	1	

No.	Result	Record	Opponent	Type	Round, time	Date	Location	Notes
1	—N/a	0–0 (1)	Marco Antonio Barrera	—N/a	8	12 Nov 2022	Manchester Arena, Manchester, England	Non-scored bout

== Titles in boxing ==
=== Major world titles ===
- WBA (Unified) light-welterweight champion (140 lbs)
- IBF light-welterweight champion (140 lbs) (2x)
- WBA welterweight champion (147 lbs)

=== The Ring magazine titles ===
- The Ring light-welterweight champion (140 lbs)

=== Minor world titles ===
- IBO light-welterweight champion (140 lbs)
- WBU light-welterweight champion (140 lbs)

=== Regional/International titles ===
- WBC International light-welterweight champion (140 lbs)
- WBA Inter-Continental light-welterweight champion (140 lbs)
- WBO Inter-Continental light-welterweight champion (140 lbs)
- British light-welterweight champion (140 lbs)
- Central Area light-welterweight champion (140 lbs)

== Pay-per-view bouts ==
No.	Date	Fight	Billing	Buys	Network	Country
1	8 Dec 2007	Mayweather vs. Hatton	Undefeated	920,000	HBO	United States
1	8 Dec 2007	Mayweather vs. Hatton	Undefeated	1,150,000	Sky Box Office	United Kingdom
2	2 May 2009	Pacquiao vs. Hatton	The Battle of East and West	850,000	HBO	United States
2	2 May 2009	Pacquiao vs. Hatton	The Battle of East and West	900,000	Sky Box Office	United Kingdom
	Total sales			3,820,000		

== See also ==
- List of boxing families

Sporting positions
Regional boxing titles
Vacant Title last held by Dean Bramhald	Central Area light-welterweight champion 27 February 1999 – May 1999; Vacated	Vacant Title next held by Tony Montana
Vacant Title last held by Emanuel Augustus	WBO Inter-Continental light-welterweight champion 29 May 1999 – October 2000; Vacated	Vacant Title next held by Ebo Elder
Preceded by Giuseppe Lauri	WBA Inter-Continental light-welterweight champion 23 September 2000 – October 2000; Vacated	Vacant Title next held by Khalid Rahilou
Preceded by Jon Thaxton	British light-welterweight champion 21 October 2000 – March 2001; Vacated	Vacant Title next held by Junior Witter
Minor world boxing titles
Vacant Title last held by Jason Rowland	WBU light-welterweight champion 26 March 2001 – 2005; Vacated	Vacant Title next held by Lee McAllister
Vacant Title last held by Stevie Johnston	IBO light-welterweight champion 20 January 2007 – 2 May 2009	Succeeded by Manny Pacquiao
Major world boxing titles
Preceded by Kostya Tszyu	IBF light-welterweight champion 4 June 2005 – 29 March 2006; Vacated	Vacant Title next held by Juan Urango
Preceded by Kostya Tszyu	The Ring light-welterweight champion 4 June 2005 – 2 May 2009	Succeeded by Manny Pacquiao
Preceded by Carlos Maussa as champion	WBA light-welterweight champion Super title 26 November 2005 – 4 May 2006; Vacated	Vacant Title next held by Amir Khan
Preceded by Luis Collazo	WBA welterweight champion 13 May 2006 – 31 August 2006; Vacated	Vacant Title next held by Miguel Cotto
Preceded by Juan Urango	IBF light-welterweight champion 20 January 2007 – 11 February 2007; Stripped	Vacant Title next held by Lovemore N'dou
Awards
Previous: Glen Johnson	The Ring Fighter of the Year; 2005	Next: Manny Pacquiao
Previous: Glen Johnson	BWAA Fighter of the Year; 2005	Next: Manny Pacquiao
Previous: Glen Johnson	ESPN Fighter of the Year; 2005	Next: Manny Pacquiao
British status
Preceded by Alan Minter	Latest born world champion to die September 14, 2025 – present	Incumbent
Junior welterweight status
Preceded by Arturo Gatti	Latest born world champion to die September 14, 2025 – present	Incumbent
Welterweight status
Preceded by Vernon Forrest	Latest born world champion to die September 14, 2025 – present	Incumbent
