= Paulie Malignaggi =

American boxer (born 1980)

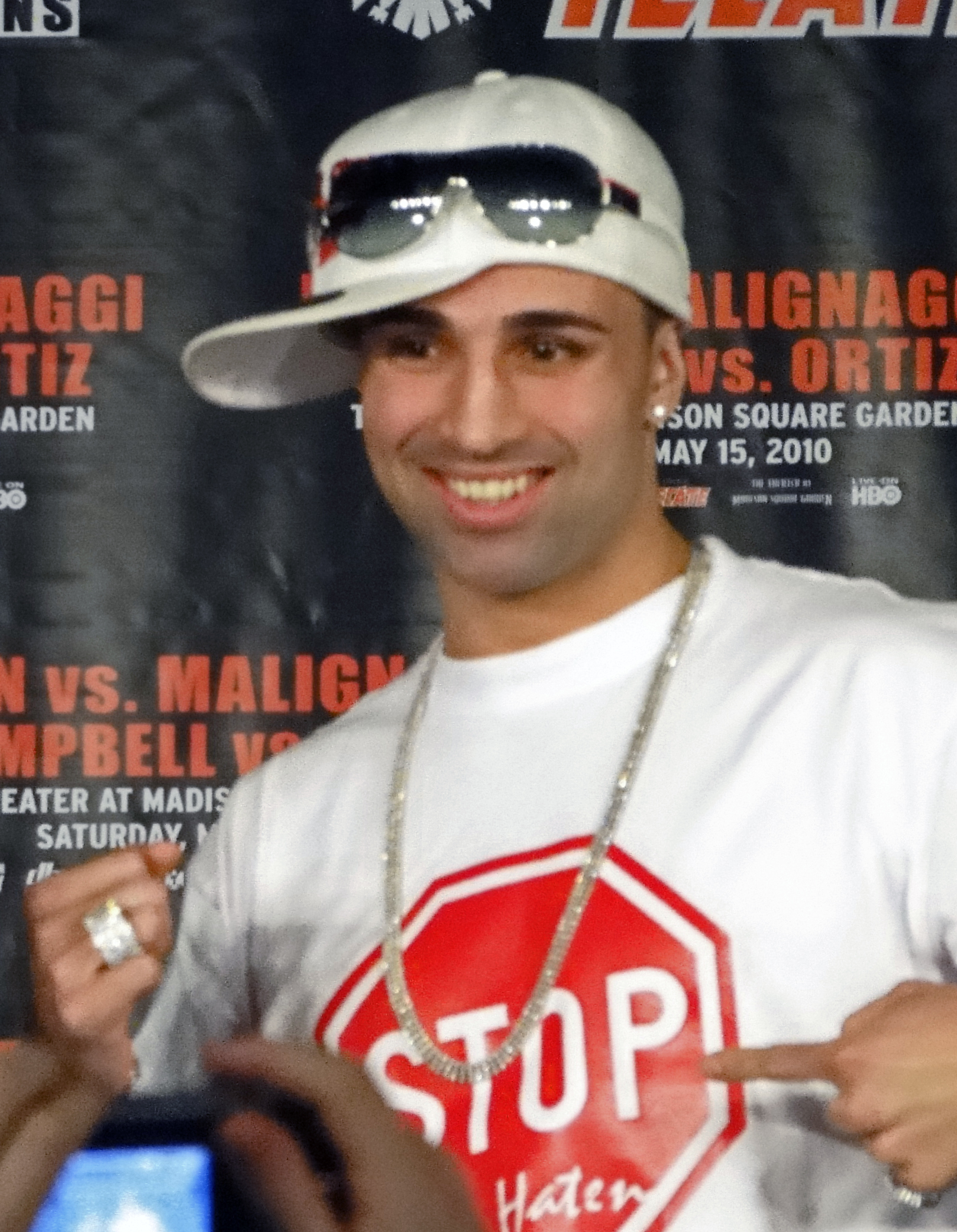
- Malignaggi in 2010

Personal information
- Nickname: Magic Man
- Nationality: American
- Born: Paul Malignaggi; November 23, 1980 (age 45) Brooklyn, New York, U.S.
- Height: 5 ft 8 in (173 cm)
- Weight: Light welterweight; Welterweight

Boxing career
- Reach: 70 in (178 cm)

Boxing record
- Total fights: 44
- Wins: 36
- Win by KO: 7
- Losses: 8
Medal record
Men's amateur boxing
Representing United States
US National Championships
Gold medal – first place	2001 Colorado Springs	Lightweight
US National PAL Championships
Gold medal – first place	2000 New Orleans	Lightweight

Paul Malignaggi (/ˈpɔːli ˌmɑːlɪˈnɑːdʒi/ MAH-lih-NAH-jee; born November 23, 1980) is an Italian-American former professional boxer who competed from 2001 to 2017 and has since worked as a boxing commentator and analyst, currently with BKB Bare Knuckle Boxing and ProBox TV alongside Mike Goldberg. He has held the world titles in two weight divisions including the International Boxing Federation (IBF) junior welterweight title from 2007 to 2008, and the World Boxing Association (WBA) welterweight title from 2012 to 2013. Malignaggi was particularly known for his hand speed, boxing ability, athleticism, and durable chin.

== Early life ==
Malignaggi was born to and raised in Bensonhurst, Brooklyn to Italian immigrant parents. He spent most of his early days in Syracuse, Sicily. Six years later, after Malignaggi's brother Umberto was born, the family decided to settle back in Brooklyn, but Malignaggi's father stayed for only a few weeks before returning to Italy. Malignaggi's mother remarried. The two brothers reputedly did not get along with their new stepfather. In 1996, the pair got into a fight with their stepfather. Not long after, the brothers left the house. Malignaggi then lived with his grandparents until he got his own home years later. Malignaggi used to violate school rules. He regularly got involved in street fights, using knives and sometimes guns. He was eventually expelled from high school for street fights and ditching classes. His grandfather took him to work each day until Malignaggi asked that he be allowed to take up boxing. He was given the chance, marking Malignaggi's transition into boxing.

== Professional career ==
=== Light welterweight ===
Upon turning pro in 2001, Malignaggi won his first 21 fights.

==== Malignaggi vs. Cotto ====
Malignaggi fought for his first world title, the WBO light welterweight title against Miguel Cotto. The fight took place on June 10, 2006, in Madison Square Garden on TOP RANK PPV. Cotto opened a cut over Malignaggi's right eye in the first round, which, according to Malignaggi, affected his performance over the course of the fight, by stating "this was the first time in which I was cut, and the blood kept going into my eye. And it bothered me the entire fight. I was not able to see very well. Cotto's a great fighter, but I'm disappointed, as I wanted to be the champion". Cotto won the fight by unanimous decision with scores of 116–111, 116–111, and 115–112. Malignaggi suffered a fractured right orbital bone and his jaw was injured, he was taken to Roosevelt Hospital after the fight's outcome was announced.

==== Malignaggi vs. Cherry, N'dou ====
Malignaggi got back on track with a unanimous decision victory over Edner Cherry at the Hammerstein Ballroom in New York City, February 17, 2007.

On June 16, 2007, Malignaggi defeated Lovemore N'dou via a 12 round unanimous decision to win the IBF Light Welterweight Championship at the Mohegan Sun Casino in Uncasville, Connecticut. The bout was one sided with one judge awarding the bout a 120–106. Lennox Lewis, who was commentating at ringside for HBO, described Malignaggi's performance as a "boxing clinic." After this win and the victory over Edner Cherry earlier in the year, Malignaggi was awarded the Ring Magazine comeback of the year award at the end of 2007.

==== Malignaggi vs. Ngoudjo, N'dou II ====
On January 5, 2008, Malignaggi defended his title against Herman Ngoudjo in a highly competitive match held at Bally's Casino in Atlantic City, New Jersey. Malignaggi controlled the fight with his jab until he was stunned in the 7th round, but Ngoudjo failed to finish the job. After the seventh, Ngoudjo became ineffective with his aggression and came up short and lost a wide unanimous decision, which although fair, did not reflect the competitiveness of the fight.

On May 24, 2008, Malignaggi beat Lovemore N'Dou in a rematch by split decision to retain his IBF title at the City of Manchester Stadium in Manchester, England. Malignaggi was in control for the first half of the fight, boxing behind his faster and crisper jab. Prior to the fight, Malignaggi was sporting hair extensions which proved to be a problem throughout the fight until his trainer Buddy McGirt cut them off in his corner between rounds eight and nine. Malignaggi appeared sloppy in the second half of the fight as N'Dou came back to make the fight close. In the end, Malignaggi pulled out a close victory and also suffered a fractured right hand in the fight. Malignaggi vacated his title on September 19, 2008.

==== Malignaggi vs. Hatton ====
On November 22, 2008, in the MGM Grand Garden Arena in Las Vegas, Malignaggi fought The Ring and IBO Light Welterweight Champion Ricky Hatton. It was billed as the boxer against the brawler. Hatton dominated and won every round but the first. Hatton rocked Malignaggi in the second and several other times during the fight, leaving Paulie to hold on, doing exactly what Malignaggi had publicly criticized Hatton for doing, while promoting the fight. With Malignaggi way behind on points, his trainer Buddy McGirt threw in the towel during the 11th round.

==== Malignaggi vs. Alvarado cancellation ====
Malignaggi was going to fight Mike Alvarado but Mike suffered an elbow injury and withdrew from the fight set for June 27, 2009.

==== Malignaggi vs. Díaz I, II ====
On August 22, 2009, at the Toyota Center in Houston, Texas, Malignaggi fought former lightweight titlist Juan Díaz for the vacant WBO NABO Light Welterweight title at a catch-weight of 138 1/2 pounds. Unofficial HBO scorer Harold Lederman scored the fight 115–113 for Malignaggi, but none of the three judges saw the fight this way. Gale Van Hoy had it by 118–110, Raul Caiz had it 115–113 and the other Judge, Dave Sutherland scored it 116–112, all in favor of Juan Díaz. In the post fight interview of the Juan Díaz fight (interviewed by Max Kellerman, HBO boxing analyst), Paulie was furious, stating that "boxing is full of shit." He also stated that the only reason he is continuing to fight is because of the good pay day.

A rematch with Juan Díaz occurred on December 12, 2009, in Chicago on HBO. This rematch went in Malignaggi's favor when he defeated Juan Díaz by unanimous decision. All three judges scored the fight 116–111 in favor of Malignaggi. In the fight, Malignaggi threw more punches but only landed 21% of them while Diaz landed 28% of his, but threw fewer.

==== Malignaggi vs. Khan ====
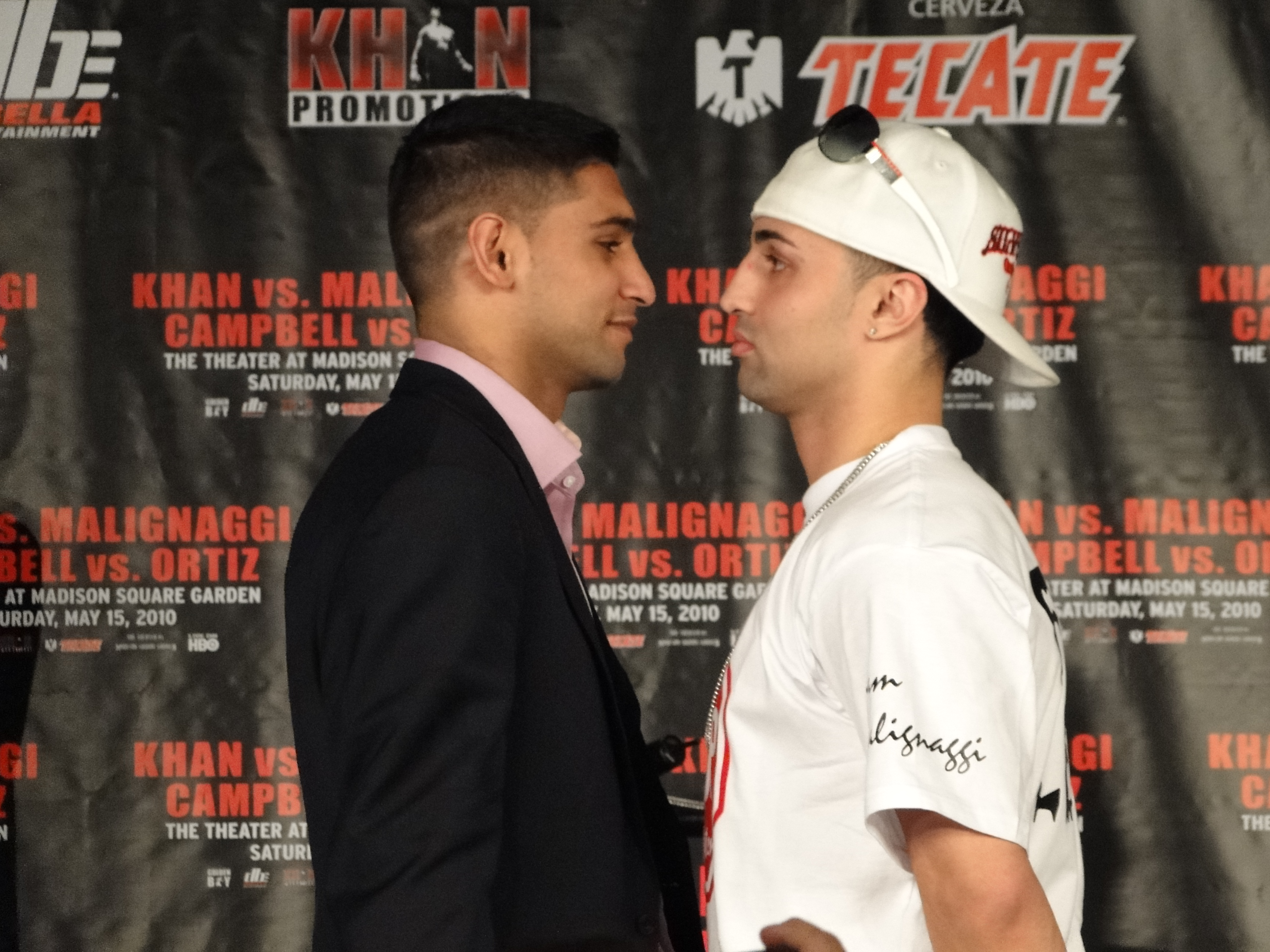
Malignaggi and Amir Khan at a press conference, 2010

Malignaggi's next fight was against Amir Khan in Madison Square Garden in New York on May 15, 2010. The press conference took place in London on March 12 on PPV while another press conference was held in New York City, United States on March 16. Malignaggi was stopped in the eleventh round by the referee. As the fight progressed, Malignaggi began to fall behind on points and the result began to get comfortable for Khan. He was very overmatched throughout the fight. This would be his last fight at Jr. welterweight, he had a very difficult time making weight for this fight and it showed in his performance. On September 28, 2010, it was announced that Malignaggi signed with Golden Boy Promotions.

=== Welterweight ===
==== Malignaggi vs. Senchenko, Cano ====
On April 29, 2012, Malignaggi fought WBA Welterweight Champion Viacheslav Senchenko in Donetsk, Ukraine. Malignaggi won by ninth-round technical knockout to take the title.

Malignaggi then went on to defeat Pablo César Cano via split decision on October 20, 2012, on the undercard of the Erik Morales vs. Danny Garcia rematch.

==== Malignaggi vs. Broner ====
After failing to secure a fight with fellow lightweight champion Ricky Burns, Adrien Broner decided to move up two weight classes to welterweight in order to fight Malignaggi. On March 10, 2013, the fight was made official. Richard Schaefer confirmed the fight would take place on June 22 at the Barclays Center in Brooklyn. In front of 11,461 on fight night, Broner defeated Malignaggi in a split decision, with one judge scoring the fight 115–113 for Malignaggi, and the other two scoring 117–111 and 115–113 for Broner, making him a 3 weight world champion at just 23 years of age. Malignaggi started the fight fast and aggressive, throwing many punches and applying his jab often. Broner found his timing by the middle of the fight, effectively timing Malignaggi with lead right hands and counter left hooks. CompuBox had Broner landing 246 (47%) of his total punches, and 214 (51%) of his power punches. Malignaggi landed 120 jabs throughout the fight, but only 94 (25%) power punches. Though there was some contention at ringside after the fight as to who deserved the split decision, The Associated Press agreed with the two judges who scored the fight for Broner, mirroring the score of 117–111 by one judge. Throughout the fight, Broner taunted Malignaggi repeatedly telling him, "You can't hit me." The pre fight was ugly and when the fight was over, they did not embrace in the ring. During the post fight interview, Broner started to show some respect, "He's a world-class fighter, and I respect him. To come to somebody's hometown and beat them on a split decision, that's saying something. This was a tremendous win for me. I mean, who's doing it like me? Nobody." He then went on to say, "I came into town, and I got his belt and his girl." Malignaggi claimed there was corruption and that Al Haymon had New York judge Tom Schreck (117–111) "in his pocket". He also threatened to quit boxing. He said, "In my hometown, as the defending champion, I felt like I should have got it." Broner earned a career-high $1.5 million compared to Malignaggi, who also earned a career-high $1.125 million purse.

==== Malignaggi vs. Judah ====
Malignaggi then faced five-time champion and fellow Brooklyn native Zab Judah at the Barclays Center in Brooklyn, New York on December 7, 2013. In the second round, after Judah connected with a hard left hand, Malignaggi went down but argued that it was a slip. Malignaggi got up and went to dominate the remainder of the fight en route to a unanimous decision victory.

==== Malignaggi vs. Porter ====
Golden Boy announced on March 12, 2014 Shawn Porter would defend his newly won IBF world title on April 19, against Malignaggi on the undercard of Bernard Hopkins vs. Beibut Shumenov at the DC Armory in Washington. Porter entered as the # 6 welterweight contender in the world according to The Ring Magazine. Malignaggi was ranked as the # 8 contender. Porter won via 4th-round TKO. A double jab opened a cut under the left eye of Malignaggi in round one. Porter had a huge second round, badly rocking Malignaggi multiple times. In round four, Porter hurt Malignaggi with a lunging left hook moments later and a barrage, which included a couple of clean right hands which sent Malignaggi down and under the bottom rope. The referee waved an end to the bout without beginning a count. In the post fight, Porter said, "The objective was to use the jab and get to the body, and it all worked. The first knockdown, he knew that right hand was going to come all night. [In the fourth round], it was a big right hand. He knew it would land all night. We kept throwing it." Malignaggi was humble in defeat, "He has potential to be great, and I told him to go be great I'm not sure what I'm going to do. I don't want to lose to an average champion. I want to lose to a great champion.If this is my last fight, I hope I lost to a great champion."

==== Malignaggi vs. O' Connor cancellation ====
Malignaggi was scheduled to face Danny O'Connor on May 29, 2015, on the Amir Khan vs. Chris Algieri undercard when he was forced to withdraw due to a deep cut above his eye he suffered in training.

==== Malignaggi vs. Garcia ====
Malignaggi took on Danny Garcia at Barclays Center, Brooklyn, August 1, 2015. It was Garcia's first step up to fight at 147 lbs. Malignaggi was cut above his right eye by the third and had a large welt beneath the right eye by the sixth. At the time of the stoppage, at the 2:22 mark of the ninth round, Malignaggi was absorbing a succession of blows as referee Arthur Mercante Jr. stepped in and wrapped his arms around him, signaling the end. Garcia was awarded a technical knockout.

==== Malignaggi vs. Fazekas, Moscatiello ====
Following the loss to Garcia, Malignaggi wasted no time to return to the ring a month later, fighting in Italy for the first time in his career against little-known 25 year old Hungarian boxer Laszlo Fazekas. In front of a sold out crowd of 550, at the Teatro Principe in Milan, Malignaggi won on points after 8 rounds. The three judges had it 79–72, 80–71, and 80–71 for Malignaggi. Fazekas showed signs of dirty tactics and paid the price by being deducted a point in round 3 for hitting with inside of the glove.

Malignaggi returned to the boxing ring again in December against Italian boxer Antonio Moscatiello (20-2-1, 14 KOs) on the undercard of Anthony Joshua vs. Dillian Whyte at the O2 Arena in a 12-round scheduled fight for the vacant EBU welterweight title. Malignaggi was supposed to fight 47-year-old Gianluca Branco, however that fell apart after Branco reportedly pulled out of the fight. The fight went the full 12 rounds as Malignaggi claimed a wide points victory. The three judges scored the fight 119–110, 119–110, and 120–109.

==== Malignaggi vs. Bracero ====
According to ESPN, reports stated Malignaggi would be fighting 35-year-old Gabriel Bracero (24-2, 5 KOs) on the undercard of the Leo Santa Cruz vs. Carl Frampton fight card on July 30 at the Barclays Center in Brooklyn, New York. Malignaggi defended his 'King of Brooklyn' belt and local bragging rights. Using rapid footwork and moving in and out, Malignaggi won the first eight rounds as Bracero stood in front of him not moving or chasing or changing strategy. The final judges' scores were 96–94, 98–92, and 98–92. After the bout, Malignaggi returned to commentating at ringside.

==== Malignaggi vs. Eggington ====
On January 25, 2017, it was announced that Malignaggi would travel to the UK to challenge 23 year old Sam Eggington (19-3, 11 KOs) for his WBC International welterweight title on the Haye-Bellew PPV undercard on March 4 at The O2 Arena. Referee Laughlin called it at 1 minute 50 seconds into round 8 with Eggington winning the fight by way of knockout. The fight came to an end when Eggington landed a body shot on Malignaggi causing him pain. This followed with a short right to the head. At the time of the stoppage, Malignaggi was ahead on two of the judges' scorecards. Malignaggi said he would be retiring with this being his last fight.

=== Retirement ===
On March 6, 2017, Malignaggi officially announced his retirement from boxing at the age of 36, calling an end to his 16-year professional career. Malignaggi wrote on social media, "Nineteen years ago today, I entered the ring for the first time as an amateur. That makes this as good a time as any to announce my retirement from competition." He finished his career with 44 professional fights, winning 36, with 7 inside the distance and 8 losses.

== Life after boxing ==
In retirement, Malignaggi joined the Team McGregor camp following the announcement of Conor McGregor's August 26, 2017, boxing bout against undefeated Floyd Mayweather. A sparring session between Malignaggi and McGregor was rumored to have become violent, and photos were leaked showing Malignaggi appearing to have been knocked down. Malignaggi disputed the rumors and announced on Aug. 3, 2017 he would be leaving Team McGregor. He also called for the full video of the sparring session to be released to show what actually took place, claiming he was pushed and never knocked down during the 12 round session. He also claimed that in fact over the 12 rounds of sparring he had dominated Conor McGregor. On August 11, two short clips of the sparring session, including of the knockdown in question, were released by Dana White on Instagram. This footage showed McGregor as the aggressor and landing multiple shots against Malignaggi, who after the release continued to assert he had been pushed, citing McGregor's hand placement holding his neck down prior to swinging a left uppercut and pushing off with his right hand.

Malignaggi was part of the Showtime broadcast team, before being removed over race comments related to a former statement by boxer Devin Haney.

== Bare knuckle boxing ==
On March 7, 2019, news surfaced that Malignaggi had signed an exclusive contract with Bare Knuckle Fighting Championship and he made his debut in June 2019 against Artem Lobov. Malignaggi has history with Lobov's training partner, Conor McGregor, and the bout between Lobov and Malignaggi was billed to be a "grudge match" and took place at BKFC 6 on June 22, 2019. Malignaggi stated "if I don't hurt him to a degree that there's something permanent there, it's not a win for me" and vowed to put Lobov in a coma hoping to bait Conor McGregor into a fight. Malignaggi lost the fight via unanimous decision. After the fight, he announced his retirement from fighting.

On October 18, 2025, Malignaggi returned to the ring to face Tyler Goodjohn. Following a gruelling five-round fight, Malignaggi emerged with a split decision victory.

On May 16, 2026, Malignaggi fought BKB World Super Welterweight champion Rolando Dy. Dy dominated the fight and dropped the 45-year-old veteran twice in the second round, forcing the referee to call it off just 56 seconds into the frame.

== Acting and other media ==
Malignaggi has featured in print clothing advertisements that have been published in magazines such as Esquire and Playboy. He also had a small role in the 2003 film Undefeated, and had a feature documentary on his life leading up his fight with Miguel Cotto, entitled Magic Man, which later aired on Showtime. Video game company Nintendo used Malignaggi to portray their character Little Mac in the live-action trailer for the 2009 game Punch-Out!! for the Wii. Also in 2009, he was a featured fighter in EA Sports' Fight Night Round 4. Malignaggi is currently an award-winning boxing commentator for Showtime, Fox Sports 1, and British network Sky Sports. In 2015, Malignaggi featured in the Blue Bloods episode "Home Sweet Home".

== Professional boxing record ==
44 fights	36 wins	8 losses
By knockout	7	5
By decision	29	3

No.	Result	Record	Opponent	Type	Round, time	Date	Location	Notes
44	Loss	36–8	Sam Eggington	KO	8 (12), 1:50	Mar 4, 2017	The O2 Arena, London, England	For WBC International welterweight title
43	Win	36–7	Gabriel Bracero	UD	10	Jul 30, 2016	Barclays Center, New York City, New York, U.S.	
42	Win	35–7	Antonio Moscatiello	UD	12	Dec 12, 2015	The O2 Arena, London, England	Won vacant European Union welterweight title
41	Win	34–7	Laszlo Fazekas	UD	8	Sep 26, 2015	Teatro Principe, Milan, Italy	
40	Loss	33–7	Danny Garcia	TKO	9 (12), 2:22	Aug 1, 2015	Barclays Center, New York City, New York, U.S.	
39	Loss	33–6	Shawn Porter	TKO	4 (12), 1:14	Apr 19, 2014	D.C. Armory, Washington, D.C.	For IBF welterweight title
38	Win	33–5	Zab Judah	UD	12	Dec 7, 2013	Barclays Center, New York City, New York, U.S.	Won vacant WBC-NABF welterweight title
37	Loss	32–5	Adrien Broner	SD	12	Jun 22, 2013	Barclays Center, New York City, New York, U.S.	Lost WBA welterweight title
36	Win	32–4	Pablo César Cano	SD	12	Oct 20, 2012	Barclays Center, New York City, New York, U.S.	Cano failed to make weight so the title was not at stake.
35	Win	31–4	Vyacheslav Senchenko	TKO	9 (12), 1:10	Apr 29, 2012	Donbas Arena, Donetsk, Ukraine	Won WBA welterweight title
34	Win	30–4	Orlando Lora	UD	10	Oct 15, 2011	Staples Center, Los Angeles, California, U.S.	
33	Win	29–4	José Cotto	UD	10	Apr 9, 2011	MGM Grand Garden Arena, Paradise, Nevada, U.S.	
32	Win	28–4	Michael Lozada	TKO	6 (10), 2:33	Dec 18, 2010	Colisée Pepsi, Quebec City, Quebec, Canada	
31	Loss	27–4	Amir Khan	TKO	11 (12), 1:25	May 15, 2010	The Theater at Madison Square Garden, New York, U.S.	For WBA light welterweight title
30	Win	27–3	Juan Díaz	UD	12	Dec 12, 2009	UIC Pavilion, Chicago, Illinois, U.S.	Won WBO–NABO light welterweight title
29	Loss	26–3	Juan Díaz	UD	12	Aug 22, 2009	Toyota Center, Houston, Texas, U.S.	For vacant WBO–NABO light welterweight title
28	Win	26–2	Christopher Fernandez	UD	8	Apr 25, 2009	Foxwoods Resort Casino, Ledyard, Connecticut, U.S.	
27	Loss	25–2	Ricky Hatton	TKO	11 (12), 0:48	Nov 22, 2008	MGM Grand Garden Arena, Paradise, Nevada, U.S.	For IBO and The Ring light welterweight titles
26	Win	25–1	Lovemore N'dou	SD	12	May 24, 2008	City Stadium, Manchester, England	Retained IBF light welterweight title
25	Win	24–1	Herman Ngoudjo	UD	12	Jan 5, 2008	Bally's Park Place, Atlantic City, New Jersey, U.S.	Retained IBF light welterweight title
24	Win	23–1	Lovemore N'dou	UD	12	Jun 16, 2007	Mohegan Sun Arena, Montville, Connecticut, U.S.	Won IBF light welterweight title
23	Win	22–1	Edner Cherry	UD	10	Feb 17, 2007	Hammerstein Ballroom, New York City, New York, U.S.	
22	Loss	21–1	Miguel Cotto	UD	12	Jun 10, 2006	Madison Square Garden, New York City, New York, U.S.	For WBO light welterweight title
21	Win	21–0	Donald Camarena	UD	10	Feb 10, 2006	Foxwoods Resort Casino, Ledyard, Connecticut, U.S.	Won WBC Continental Americas light welterweight title
20	Win	20–0	Jeremy Yelton	UD	8	Aug 25, 2005	Hammerstein Ballroom, New York City, New York, U.S.	
19	Win	19–0	Sandro Casamonica	TD	7 (12), 3:00	Dec 4, 2004	Barton Coliseum, Little Rock, Arkansas, U.S.	Won WBC International light welterweight title; Unanimous TD after Casamonica was cut from an accidental head clash
18	Win	18–0	Ramiro Cano	UD	10	Jun 17, 2004	Harrah's, Laughlin, Nevada, U.S.	
17	Win	17–0	Rocky Martinez	UD	10	Apr 22, 2004	Manhattan Center Grand Ballroom, New York City, New York, U.S.	
16	Win	16–0	Paul Delgado	UD	8	Dec 6, 2003	Madison Square Garden, New York City, New York, U.S.	
15	Win	15–0	Jesus Abel Santiago	UD	8	Oct 24, 2003	Jimmy's Bronx Cafe, New York City, New York, U.S.	
14	Win	14–0	Kevin Watts	TKO	6 (10), 2:09	Aug 1, 2003	Casino Ballroom, Hampton, New Hampshire, U.S.	
13	Win	13–0	Shad Howard	UD	6	Jun 3, 2003	Mohegan Sun Arena, Montville, Connecticut, U.S.	
12	Win	12–0	Paul Delgado	SD	8	Nov 23, 2002	Boardwalk Hall, Atlantic City, New Jersey, U.S.	
11	Win	11–0	Chad Lawshe	UD	6	Oct 13, 2002	Loews Regency Hotel, New York City, New York, U.S.	
10	Win	10–0	Anthony Simpkins	TKO	2 (6), 2:44	Aug 30, 2002	Harry Cipriani Bar, New York City, New York, U.S.	
9	Win	9–0	Jadschi Green	UD	6	Jul 26, 2002	Mountaineer Casino Racetrack and Resort, Chester, West Virginia, U.S.	
8	Win	8–0	Andre Baker	UD	6	May 30, 2002	Days Inn, Allentown, Pennsylvania, U.S.	
7	Win	7–0	Sterling Gethers	UD	4	Apr 12, 2002	Foxwoods Resort Casino, Ledyard, Connecticut, U.S.	
6	Win	6–0	Antonio Young	UD	6	Jan 18, 2002	Hilton Hotel, Huntington, New York, U.S.	
5	Win	5–0	Jose LaPorte	UD	4	Dec 7, 2001	Foxwoods Resort Casino, Ledyard, Connecticut, U.S.	
4	Win	4–0	Cornell Jackson	UD	4	Nov 23, 2001	Roseland Ballroom, New York City, New York, U.S.	
3	Win	3–0	Luis Melendez	KO	3 (4), 3:00	Nov 10, 2001	Fernwood Hotel & Resort, Bushkill, Pennsylvania, U.S.	
2	Win	2–0	Robert Sowers	TKO	4 (4), 2:55	Jul 26, 2001	Roseland Ballroom, New York City, New York, U.S.	
1	Win	1–0	Thadeus Parker	TKO	1 (4), 2:33	Jul 7, 2001	KeySpan Park, New York City, New York, U.S.	

== Exhibition boxing record ==
1 fight	1 win	0 losses
By decision	1	0

No.	Result	Record	Opponent	Type	Round, time	Date	Location	Notes
1	Win	1–0	Corey Bonalewicz	UD	3	Oct 2, 2021	Knight Center Complex, Miami, Florida, U.S.	

== Bare knuckle record ==
Professional record breakdown
3 matches	1 win	2 losses
By knockout	0	1
By decision	1	1

Res.	Record	Opponent	Method	Event	Date	Round	Time	Location	Notes
Loss	1–2	Rolando Dy	KO (punch)	BKB 54	May 16, 2026	2	0:56	Manchester, England	For the BKB World Super Welterweight Championship.
Win	1–1	Tyler Goodjohn	Decision (split)	BKB 47	October 18, 2025	5	3:00	Leeds, England	
Loss	0–1	Artem Lobov	Decision (unanimous)	BKFC 6	June 22, 2019	5	2:00	Tampa, Florida, United States	

Sporting positions
Amateur boxing titles
Previous: Rock Allen	U.S. lightweight champion 2001	Next: Verquan Kimbrough
Regional boxing titles
Vacant Title last held by Miguel Cotto	WBC International light welterweight champion December 4, 2004 – August 2005; Vacated	Vacant Title next held by Herman Ngoudjo
Preceded by Donald Camarena	WBC Continental Americas light welterweight champion February 10, 2006 – June 2006; Vacated	Vacant Title next held by Emanuel Augustus
Vacant Title last held by Ahmed El Mousaoui	European Union welterweight champion December 12, 2015 – May 2016; Vacated	Vacant Title next held by Mohamed Mimoune
World boxing titles
Preceded by Lovemore N'dou	IBF light welterweight champion June 16, 2007 – September 19, 2008; Vacated	Vacant Title next held by Juan Urango
Preceded by Vyacheslav Senchenko	WBA welterweight champion April 29, 2012 – June 22, 2013	Succeeded by Adrien Broner
Awards
Previous: Oleg Maskaev	The Ring Comeback of the Year; 2007	Next: Vitali Klitschko
