= Naoufel Ben Rabah =

Tunisian boxer (born 1977)

Personal information
- Nationality: Tunisian
- Born: 18 November 1977 (age 48) Tunis, Tunisia
- Height: 1.70 m (5 ft 7 in)
- Weight: Lightweight; Light welterweight; Welterweight

Boxing career

Boxing record
- Total fights: 41
- Wins: 37
- Win by KO: 20
- Losses: 4
Medal record
Men's Boxing
Representing Tunisia
All-Africa Games
Silver medal – second place	1999 Johannesburg	Lightweight

Naoufel Ben Rabah (born 18 November 1977) is a Tunisian former professional boxer who competed from 2001 to 2013. He twice challenged for the IBF light welterweight title between 2006 and 2007.

Born in Tunisia, Ben Rabah represented his native country at the 2000 Summer Olympics. There he was eliminated in the first round of the competition. Later he became a pro and currently boxes out of Germany. On 30 June 2006 he lost a controversial decision to Juan Urango for the vacant IBF belt.
