= Juan Urango =

Colombian boxer (born 1980)

Personal information
- Nickname: Iron Twin
- Nationality: Colombian
- Born: Juan Fernando Urango Rivas; October 4, 1980 (age 46) Montería, Córdoba, Colombia
- Weight: Light welterweight; Welterweight

Boxing career
- Stance: Southpaw

Boxing record
- Total fights: 28
- Wins: 24
- Win by KO: 19
- Losses: 3
- Draws: 1

Juan Fernando Urango Rivas (born October 4, 1980), best known as Juan Urango, is a Colombian former professional boxer who competed from 2002 to 2012. He held the IBF junior welterweight title twice between 2006 and 2010, and challenged once for the WBC welterweight title in 2009. His nickname of "Iron Twin" is a reference to his twin brother, Pedro Urango, who is also a former boxer.

== Professional career ==
Urango made his professional debut on April 30, 2002, scoring a second-round knockout against Efrain Sotomayor. On August 5, 2004, Urango challenged Mike Arnaoutis for the WBO–NABO light welterweight title, but their fight ended in a majority draw. In his next fight, on December 16, 2004, Urango stopped Ubaldo Hernandez to win the vacant WBC Latino light welterweight title. He unified this with the IBF Latino title by knocking out Francisco Campos in five rounds on April 22, 2005. Urango won his first world championship—the vacant IBF light welterweight title—on June 20, 2006, by scoring a unanimous decision (UD) over Naoufel Ben Rabah, but would lose by the same result in his first defense, on January 20, 2007, against Ricky Hatton (who had vacated the title in March 2006).

2009 was a busy year for Urango: on January 30, 2009, he regained the IBF title (which was again vacant) by defeating Herman Ngoudjo via UD. On May 30, Urango briefly moved up to welterweight, but lost an uncompetitive UD to WBC champion Andre Berto. Returning on August 28, Urango faced Randall Bailey in defense of his IBF light welterweight title. In an action-packed fight, Urango was knocked down for the first time in his career, but responded by knocking down Bailey three times to score a late stoppage in the eleventh round.

On March 6, 2010, Urango attempted to unify his IBF title with that of WBC champion Devon Alexander. The fight was competitive through eight rounds, until Alexander landed a hard right uppercut to send Urango to the canvas. Despite being badly hurt, Urango managed to beat the referee's count and continue momentarily, but was then floored again. He got up for a second time, only for the referee to deem him unable to continue. Urango would spend more than two years away from the sport, retiring to work on a pig farm he had bought in Colombia. He had two comeback fights against journeyman opposition on April 26 and September 14, 2012, but has not fought since.

== Personal life ==
Urango is a devout Christian, and was raised on his family's farm in Montería.

== Professional boxing record ==
28 fights	24 wins	3 losses
By knockout	19	1
By decision	5	2
Draws	1	

No.	Result	Record	Opponent	Type	Round, time	Date	Location	Notes
28	Win	24–3–1	Oney Valdez	KO	5 (10), 1:57	Sep 14, 2012	Centro Recreativo Tacasuam, Montería, Colombia	
27	Win	23–3–1	Cristian Chavez	KO	2 (10), 0:59	Apr 26, 2012	Expo Bancomer, Mexico City, Mexico	
26	Loss	22–3–1	Devon Alexander	TKO	8 (12), 1:12	Mar 6, 2010	Mohegan Sun Arena, Montville, Connecticut, U.S.	Lost IBF light welterweight title; For WBC light welterweight title
25	Win	22–2–1	Randall Bailey	TKO	11 (12), 1:51	Aug 28, 2009	Hard Rock Live, Hollywood, Florida, U.S.	Retained IBF light welterweight title
24	Loss	21–2–1	Andre Berto	UD	12	May 30, 2009	Hard Rock Live, Hollywood, Florida, U.S.	For WBC welterweight title
23	Win	21–1–1	Herman Ngoudjo	UD	12	Jan 30, 2009	Bell Centre, Montreal, Quebec, Canada	Won vacant IBF light welterweight title
22	Win	20–1–1	Carlos Wilfredo Vilches	KO	4 (12), 1:45	Apr 23, 2008	Hard Rock Live, Hollywood, Florida, U.S.	
21	Win	19–1–1	Marty Robbins	TKO	5 (10), 2:44	Dec 5, 2007	Hard Rock Live, Hollywood, Florida, U.S.	
20	Win	18–1–1	Nasser Athumani	TKO	4 (10), 2:59	Aug 31, 2007	Boardwalk Hall, Atlantic City, New Jersey, U.S.	
19	Loss	17–1–1	Ricky Hatton	UD	12	Jan 20, 2007	Paris Las Vegas, Paradise, Nevada, U.S.	Lost IBF light welterweight title; For vacant IBO light welterweight title
18	Win	17–0–1	Naoufel Ben Rabah	UD	12	Jun 30, 2006	Hard Rock Live, Hollywood, Florida, U.S.	Won vacant IBF light welterweight title
17	Win	16–0–1	Andre Eason	TKO	7 (12), 2:59	Aug 26, 2005	Hard Rock Live, Hollywood, Florida, U.S.	Retained WBC Latino light welterweight title
16	Win	15–0–1	Francisco Campos	KO	5 (12), 1:46	Apr 22, 2005	Hard Rock Live, Hollywood, Florida, U.S.	Retained WBC Latino light welterweight title; Won IBF Latino light welterweight title
15	Win	14–0–1	Ubaldo Hernandez	TKO	2 (12), 2:35	Dec 16, 2004	Hard Rock Live, Hollywood, Florida, U.S.	Won vacant WBC Latino light welterweight title
14	Draw	13–0–1	Mike Arnaoutis	MD	12	Aug 5, 2004	Hard Rock Live, Hollywood, Florida, U.S.	For NABO light welterweight title
13	Win	13–0	Sergey Sorokin	UD	6	Jun 8, 2004	Hard Rock Live, Hollywood, Florida, U.S.	
12	Win	12–0	Levan Kirakosyan	PTS	8	Feb 6, 2004	Guadalajara, Spain	
11	Win	11–0	Frank Oppong	PTS	6	Oct 11, 2003	Soria, Spain	
10	Win	10–0	Marcos Munoz	KO	2 (8)	Sep 26, 2003	Alameda Palace Hotel, Salamanca, Spain	
9	Win	9–0	Ricardo Antonio Vieira	KO	1 (6)	Jul 24, 2003	Ordizia, Spain	
8	Win	8–0	Luis Martinez	KO	1 (6)	Dec 22, 2002	Colombia	
7	Win	7–0	Eduardo Morales	KO	2	Oct 21, 2002	Colombia	
6	Win	6–0	Amaury Racero	TKO	2 (6)	Aug 30, 2002	Montería, Colombia	
5	Win	5–0	Dagoberto Geles	KO	5	Jul 27, 2002	Colombia	
4	Win	4–0	Pedro Fuentes	TKO	3 (10)	Jul 26, 2002	Colombia	
3	Win	3–0	Luis Blandon	KO	3	Jun 15, 2002	Cartagena, Colombia	
2	Win	2–0	Amaury Racero	KO	2	May 21, 2002	Colombia	
1	Win	1–0	Efrain Sotomayor	KO	2 (6)	Apr 30, 2002	Montería, Colombia	

Sporting positions
Regional boxing titles
Vacant Title last held by Carlos Maussa	WBC Latino light welterweight champion December 16, 2004 – May 2006; Vacated	Vacant Title next held by Americo Santos
Vacant Title last held by Luis Alberto Santiago	IBF Latino light welterweight champion April 22, 2005 – August 2005; Vacated	Vacant Title next held by Heraclides Barrantes
World boxing titles
Vacant Title last held by Ricky Hatton	IBF light welterweight champion June 30, 2006 – January 20, 2007	Succeeded by Ricky Hatton
Vacant Title last held by Paulie Malignaggi	IBF light welterweight champion January 30, 2009 – March 6, 2010	Succeeded by Devon Alexander
