= Katsidis =

Katsidis is a surname. Notable people associated with the surname include:

- Michael Katsidis
- Stathi Katsidis
