= Juan Manuel Márquez vs. Michael Katsidis =

Boxing competition

Warriors: Marquez vs. Katsidis
- Date: November 27, 2010
- Venue: MGM Grand Garden Arena, Las Vegas, United States
- Title(s) on the line: WBA (Super), WBO, and The Ring lightweight titles

Tale of the tape
| Boxer | (Mexico) Juan Manuel Marquez | (Australia) Michael Katsidis |
| Nickname | Dinamita | The Great |
| Hometown | Mexico City, Distrito Federal, Mexico | Toowoomba, Queensland, Australia |
| Pre-fight record | 51–5–1 (37 KO) | 27–2–0 (22 KO) |
| Height | 5 ft 7 in (170 cm) | 5 ft 7 in (170 cm) |
| Weight | 134 lb (61 kg) | 135 lb (61 kg) |
| Recognition | WBA (Super), WBO, and The Ring lightweight champion The Ring No. 3 ranked pound-for-pound fighter 3-division world champion | WBO interim lightweight champion |

Result
- Márquez defeats Katsidis via TKO of round 9.

Juan Manuel Márquez vs. Michael Katsidis was a professional boxing match contested on November 27, 2010, for the WBA, WBO, and The Ring lightweight championship.

== Background ==
Lightweight champion Juan Manuel Marquez agreed to fight Michael Katsidis at the MGM Grand Garden Arena on the Las Vegas Strip on November 27. Marquez (51–5–1, 37 KOs) had decisively won a rematch with Juan Diaz on July 31 in his first fight since losing to Floyd Mayweather Jr. in their 2009 bout. After failing to interest Manny Pacquiao in a third fight, Marquez agreed to a mandatory title defense against Michael Katsidis (27–2, 22 KOs), who had revitalized his career with four straight victories following back-to-back losses to Joel Casamayor and Juan Diaz.

There was speculation that the fight was going to be postponed because the brother of Katsidis was found dead on October 19, 2010, in his Brisbane, Australia home. Katsidis was out for a run when Smith received a call from Katsidis' mother. Katsidis' older brother, Stathi Katsidis, had been found dead of a possible drug overdose in his Brisbane home by his girlfriend, Melissa Jackson. Things are back to the plan, and he would indeed challenge Marquez, despite the death of his older brother, Stathi Katsidis.

After Manny Pacquiao's beating of Antonio Margarito there were many speculated opponents. One that stood out was a rubber match between Marquez and Pacquiao (if he got through Katsidis). Pacquiao planned to retire before the age of 35, he told a news conference in Manila. He said he would fight Marquez again but that the match would probably not excite fans. "I would not watch Pacquiao vs. Marquez," he said. Though Marquez would have to go up to Welterweight (2 weight classes up) to challenge, Pacquiao outweighed Marquez by no more than around 3 lbs on the night of the fight; Marquez rehydrated to 145 lbs vs. Katsidis, while Pacquiao rehydrated to 148 lbs vs. Margarito.

== The fight ==
Dinamita successfully defended his WBA and WBO lightweight titles, stopping Katsidis at 2:14 in the ninth round. Katsidis knocked down Marquez with a left hook in the third round, but Marquez rallied to take the lead before finishing off Katsidis in the ninth round. Marquez had slowed to the point that he almost seemed to prefer getting into slugfests where he could still use his excellent counter-punching accuracy, while Katsidis had never been one to turn down a blood-drenched war.

In the ninth round, Marquez landed 36 punches to nine for Katsidis. Kenny Bayless halted the bout after several combinations hurt Katsidis. After eight rounds, the three judges had the 37-year-old Marquez leading, 78–74, 76–75, 77–74.

== Fight earnings ==
- Juan Manuel Márquez $1,400,000 vs. Michael Katsidis $530,000
- Andre Berto $1,250,000 vs. Freddy Hernandez

== Undercard ==
=== Televised ===
- Lightweight Championship bout: (Mexico) Juan Manuel Márquez(c) vs. (Australia) Michael Katsidis
  - Márquez defeats Katsidis via TKO at 2:14 of round 9.
- Welterweight Championship bout: (United States) Andre Berto(c) vs (Mexico) Freddy Hernandez
  - Berto defeats Hernandez via TKO at 2:07 of round 1.
- Super Featherweight bout: (Panama) Celestino Caballero vs. (United States) Jason Litzau
  - Litzau defeats Caballero via split decision (97–93, 96–94, 94–96).

=== Untelevised ===
- Light Middleweight bout: (United States) Erislandy Lara vs. (United States) Tim Connors
  - Lara defeats Connors via TKO at 1:38 of round 1.
- Light Welterweight bout: (United States) Nate Campbell vs. (Colombia) Walter Estrada
  - Estrada defeats Campbell via split decision (77–74, 77–74, and 75–76).
- Light Middleweight bout: (United States) Keith Thurman vs. (United States) Favio Medina
  - Thurman defeats Medina via TKO at 2:34 of round 4.
- Super Middleweight bout: (Ghana) Bastie Samir vs. (United States) Billy Cunningham
  - Samir defeats Cunningham via TKO at 1:56 of round 2.
- Welterweight bout: (United States) Michael Finney vs. (United States) Clayvonne Howard
  - Finney defeats Howard via TKO at 1:26 of round 2.

| Preceded by vs. Juan Diaz II | Juan Manuel Marquez's bouts November 27, 2010 | Succeeded by vs. Likar Ramos |
| Preceded by vs. Kevin Mitchell | Michael Katsidis's bouts November 27, 2010 | Succeeded by vs. Robert Guerrero |
