= Juan Manuel Márquez vs. Juan Díaz =

Boxing match

A Battle for the Ages. A Fight for Supremacy
- Date: February 28, 2009
- Venue: Toyota Center, Houston, Texas, U.S.
- Title(s) on the line: The Ring and vacant WBA (Super) and WBO lightweight titles

Tale of the tape
Boxer	Juan Manuel Márquez	Juan Díaz
Nickname	Dinamita ("Dynamite")	"Baby Bull"
Hometown	Mexico City, Mexico	Houston, Texas, U.S.
Pre-fight record	49–4–1 (36 KO)	34–1 (17 KO)
Age	35 years, 6 months	25 years, 5 months
Height	5 ft 7 in (170 cm)	5 ft 6 in (168 cm)
Weight	134 1/2 lb (61 kg)	134 1/2 lb (61 kg)
Style	Orthodox	Orthodox
Recognition	The Ring lightweight champion The Ring No. 2 ranked pound-for-pound fighter 3-division world champion	IBO lightweight champion

Result
- Márquez wins via 9th-round TKO

Juan Manuel Márquez vs. Juan Díaz, billed as A Battle for the Ages. A Fight for Supremacy, was a boxing lightweight title superfight, for the vacant WBO and WBA lightweight championship, and Marquez's The Ring lightweight title. The bout was held on February 28, 2009, at the Toyota Center in Houston, Texas, United States. Márquez won the fight via technical knockout in the ninth round.

The match was named the 2009 Fight of the Year.

During the undercard, Márquez's former opponents Chris John and Rocky Juarez battled for John's WBA Featherweight title, which ended in a rare unanimous draw (114–114 on all three cards).

== The fight ==
Díaz controlled the fight early in the bout as the two boxers exchanged punches. Díaz opened a cut above Márquez's right eye in the fifth round, and looked to control the bout, but Márquez responded by opening a gash above Diaz's right eye, and stunning him with a left hook before the end of the eighth round. Márquez landed two hard rights to Díaz's face in a three-punch combination that knocked Díaz down with 35 seconds remaining in the ninth round. Díaz rose, but seconds later, Márquez followed with a right uppercut to the chin that knocked Díaz down for a second time. Referee Rafael Ramos waved an end to the fight after two minutes and 40 seconds of the ninth round.

== Aftermath ==
With the victory, Márquez defended his Ring Lightweight title, and claimed the WBO, the WBA, and the IBO Lightweight championship titles.

His next fight was against the returning Floyd Mayweather Jr., which was first announced on May 1st. The fight was set at a catchweight of 145 lbs and is originally slated for July 18th, before the date was pushed to September 19th due to Mayweather suffering a rib injury during training. Márquez ultimately lost the fight to Mayweather via a one-sided unanimous decision.

Both men eventually fought in a rematch the following year in Las Vegas, with Márquez winning back-to-back via a 12-round unanimous decision.

== Undercard ==
Confirmed bouts:

== Broadcasting ==
Country	Broadcaster
Australia	Main Event
United States	HBO

Preceded by vs. Joel Casamayor	Juan Manuel Márquez's bouts 28 February 2009	Succeeded by vs. Floyd Mayweather Jr.
Preceded by vs. Michael Katsidis	Juan Díaz's bouts 28 February 2009	Succeeded by vs. Paulie Malignaggi
Awards
Preceded by Israel Vázquez vs. Rafael Márquez III	The Ring Fight of the Year; 2009	Succeeded by Ivan Calderon vs. Giovani Segura
Preceded by Israel Vázquez vs. Rafael Márquez III	Ali–Frazier Award; 2009	Succeeded by Amir Khan vs. Marcos Maidana
