= Graham Earl =

British former professional boxer

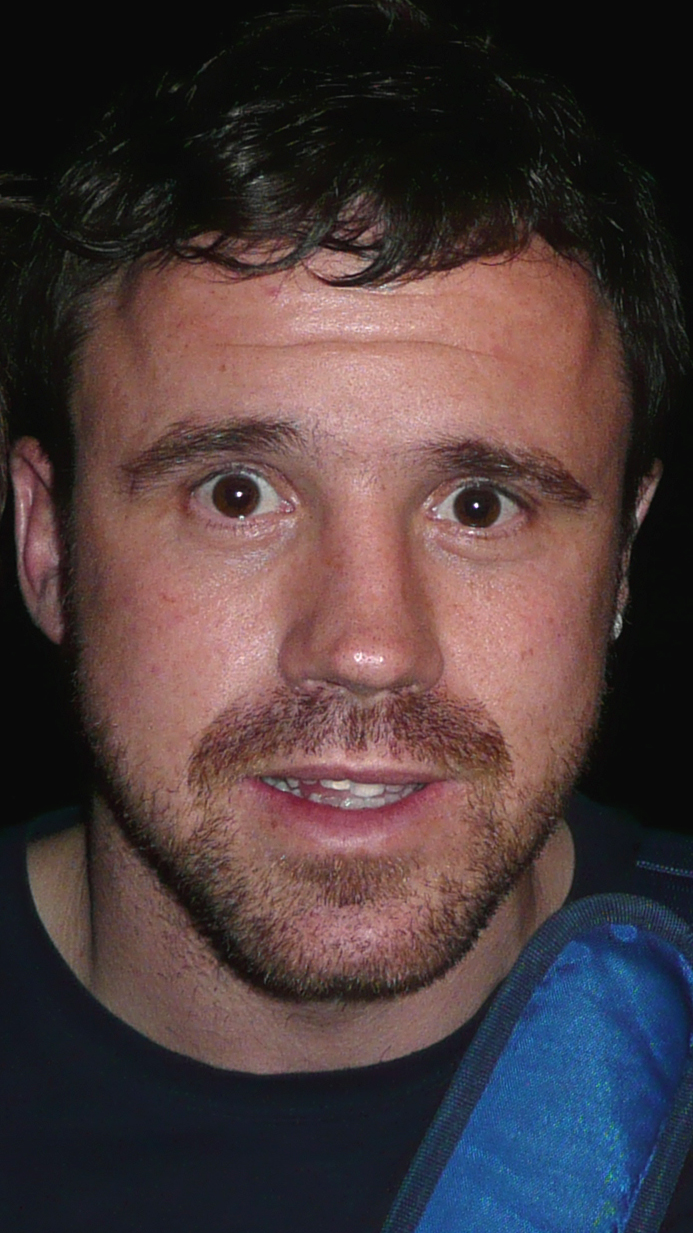
- Earl in 2011

Personal information
- Nickname: The Duke (of Earl)
- Born: 26 August 1978 (age 47) Luton, Bedfordshire, England
- Height: 5 ft 5 1/2 in (166 cm)
- Weight: Lightweight; Light-welterweight; Welterweight

Boxing career
- Stance: Orthodox

Boxing record
- Total fights: 32
- Wins: 26
- Win by KO: 12
- Losses: 6

Graham Earl (born 26 August 1978) is a British former professional boxer who competed between 1997 and 2014. He held the British lightweight title twice between 2003 and 2006, the Commonwealth lightweight title from 2005 to 2006, and challenged once for the WBO interim lightweight title in 2007.

== Amateur career ==
Earl began boxing at the age of eight. As an amateur boxer, he fought for England Schools and won his first eighteen fights.

== Professional career ==
Earl made his professional debut on 2 September 1997, scoring a second-round stoppage over Mark O'Callaghan. He would spend the next eight years undefeated, winning 21 consecutive fights. During this time Earl won the British lightweight title twice, on 17 July 2003 and 5 June 2004, both times against Bobby Vanzie. On 25 February 2005, Earl lost for the first time to Ricky Burns, who won an eight-round points decision. In Earl's next fight, on 19 June 2005, he bounced back to retain his British lightweight title and win the Commonwealth lightweight title against Kevin Bennett.

On 17 February 2007, a bout for the newly created and vacant WBO interim lightweight title was made between Earl and Michael Katsidis. In an action-packed and fast-paced fight, Earl and Katsidis went toe-to-toe and traded many heavy blows, during which Earl was knocked down twice in the opening round and again in the second. However, soon after getting back to his feet following the third knockdown and having the towel being thrown in seconds later (only for it to be thrown back out again by referee Mickey Vann), Earl managed to floor Katsidis momentarily with a heavy right hand at close quarters, rendering the latter visibly stunned and unsteady on his feet. Earl's comeback would ultimately be short-lived, as Katsidis recovered swiftly and finished the round strongly. At the very end of round three, a low blow cost Katsidis a point, but in the following rounds he went on to deliver a barrage of largely unanswered punches to Earl until the decision was made Earl's cornermen to stop the fight after the fifth round.

Earl suffered his third loss and second in a row on 8 December 2007, when he was stopped in the first round by Amir Khan. This was repeated by Henry Castle on 17 October 2008, who stopped Earl in one round. After a five-year retirement, Earl returned to the sport on 4 July 2014. He travelled to Australia to face Michael Katsidis in a rematch from their 2007 bout, this time at light-welterweight. Katsidis won a wide twelve-round unanimous decision. Earl's final professional fight was a ten-round stoppage loss to Steve Martin on 22 August 2014.

== Personal life ==
The youngest of three brothers, Earl grew up in the Limbury council estate of Luton and attended Icknield High School. He has two children with his ex-wife. In April 2015, Earl was sentenced to seven years in prison for illegal drug trafficking.

== Professional boxing record ==
32 fights	26 wins	6 losses
By knockout	12	4
By decision	14	2

No.	Result	Record	Opponent	Type	Round, time	Date	Location	Notes
32	Loss	26–6	Steve Martin	TKO	10 (12), 0:51	22 Aug 2014	Hilton Hotel Portomaso, St. Julian's, Malta	For vacant World Boxing Foundation welterweight title
31	Loss	26–5	Michael Katsidis	UD	12	4 Jul 2014	Rumours International, Toowoomba, Australia	For vacant WBU (German) light-welterweight title
30	Win	26–4	Karl Taylor	PTS	6	28 Jun 2009	Liquid & Envy, Luton, England	
29	Loss	25–4	Henry Castle	TKO	1 (8), 1:09	17 Oct 2008	York Hall, London, England	
28	Loss	25–3	Amir Khan	TKO	1 (12), 1:12	8 Dec 2007	Bolton Arena, Bolton, England	For Commonwealth lightweight title
27	Loss	25–2	Michael Katsidis	RTD	5 (12), 3:00	17 Feb 2007	Wembley Arena, London, England	For vacant WBO interim lightweight title
26	Win	25–1	Angel Hugo Ramirez	UD	12	28 Oct 2006	York Hall, London, England	Won vacant WBU lightweight title
25	Win	24–1	Yuri Ramanau	PTS	12	27 Jan 2006	Goresbrook Leisure Centre, London, England	
24	Win	23–1	Kevin Bennett	TKO	9 (12), 2:10	19 Jun 2005	York Hall, London, England	Retained British lightweight title; Won Commonwealth lightweight title
23	Loss	22–1	Ricky Burns	PTS	8	25 Feb 2005	Wembley Conference Centre, London, England	
22	Win	22–0	Steve Murray	TKO	6 (12), 2:37	30 Jul 2004	York Hall, London, England	Retained British lightweight title
21	Win	21–0	Bobby Vanzie	PTS	12	5 Jun 2004	York Hall, London, England	Won vacant British lightweight title
20	Win	20–0	Jon Honney	PTS	8	11 Oct 2003	Mountbatten Centre, Portsmouth, England	
19	Win	19–0	Bobby Vanzie	PTS	12	17 Jul 2003	Goresbrook Leisure Centre, London, England	Won British lightweight title
18	Win	18–0	Nikolay Eremeev	PTS	8	24 May 2003	York Hall, London, England	
17	Win	17–0	Steve Murray	TKO	2 (12), 2:02	15 Feb 2003	Wembley Conference Centre, London, England	Retained Southern Area lightweight title
16	Win	16–0	Chill John	PTS	10	12 Oct 2002	York Hall, London, England	Retained Southern Area lightweight title
15	Win	15–0	Mark Winters	PTS	10	15 Dec 2001	Wembley Conference Centre, London, England	
14	Win	14–0	Liam Maltby	KO	1 (10)	22 Sep 2001	York Hall, London, England	Retained Southern Area lightweight title
13	Win	13–0	Brian Gentry	TKO	8 (10)	10 Mar 2001	York Hall, London, England	Won vacant Southern Area lightweight title
12	Win	12–0	Leeroy Williamson	TKO	3 (6)	21 Oct 2000	Wembley Conference Centre, London, England	
11	Win	11–0	Marco Fattore	PTS	6	29 Apr 2000	Wembley Arena, London, England	
10	Win	10–0	Ivo Golakov	TKO	1 (6)	4 Mar 2000	Werrington Sports Centre, Peterborough, England	
9	Win	9–0	Simon Chambers	KO	6 (6), 2:48	15 Jul 1999	Werrington Sports Centre, Peterborough, England	
8	Win	8–0	Benny Jones	PTS	6	8 May 1999	York Hall, London, England	
7	Win	7–0	Leeroy Williamson	TKO	4 (4), 2:33	16 Jan 1999	York Hall, London, England	
6	Win	6–0	Marc Smith	TKO	1 (6), 2:02	10 Dec 1998	The Broadway, London, England	
5	Win	5–0	Brian Coleman	PTS	4	12 Sep 1998	York Hall, London, England	
4	Win	4–0	David Kirk	PTS	4	23 May 1998	York Hall, London, England	
3	Win	3–0	Danny Lutaaya	TKO	2 (4), 1:35	11 Apr 1998	Elephant and Castle Shopping Centre, London, England	
2	Win	2–0	Mark McGowan	PTS	4	6 Dec 1997	Wembley Arena, London, England	
1	Win	1–0	Mark O'Callaghan	TKO	2 (4)	2 Sep 1997	Elephant and Castle Shopping Centre, London, England	

Sporting positions
Regional boxing titles
Vacant Title last held by Colin Dunne	Southern Area lightweight champion 10 March 2001 – 17 July 2003; Won British title	Vacant Title next held by Peter McDonagh
Preceded by Bobby Vanzie	British lightweight champion 17 July 2003 – 2004; Vacated	Vacant Title next held by Himself
Vacant Title last held by Himself	British lightweight champion 5 June 2004 – May 2006; Vacated	Vacant Title next held by Lee Meager
Preceded by Kevin Bennett	Commonwealth lightweight champion 19 June 2005 – November 2006; Vacated	Vacant Title next held by Willie Limond
Minor world boxing titles
Vacant Title last held by Tontcho Tontchev	WBU lightweight champion 28 October 2006 – February 2007; Vacated	Vacant Title next held by Lee McAllister
