= Jason Litzau =

American boxer

Personal information
- Nickname: American Boy aka MR Hollywood
- Born: Jason John Litzau; June 29, 1983 (age 43) Saint Paul, Minnesota, U.S.
- Height: 5 ft 10 in (178 cm)
- Weight: Featherweight; Super featherweight; Lightweight

Boxing career
- Reach: 73 in (185 cm)
- Stance: Orthodox

Boxing record
- Total fights: 34
- Wins: 30
- Win by KO: 23
- Losses: 3
- Draws: 1

Jason John Litzau (born June 29, 1983) is an American former professional boxer who competed between 2002 and 2016. He challenged once for the IBF featherweight title in 2008.

== Early life ==
In his youth Litzau played Little League Baseball, as a pitcher where he won a little league title by pitching a shutout. He attended Harding Senior High School in St. Paul, Minnesota. Litzau's brother Allen Litzau is also a professional boxer.

== Amateur career ==
Known as "The American Boy", Litzau began boxing at 11 years old and reportedly compiled an amateur record of 125-10 Litzau is a former Silver Gloves national champion, having finished second at the 2001 U.S. Championships and earning a spot on the 2001 U.S. National team.

Litzau turned pro in 2002.

== Professional career ==
Litzau turned pro on November 16, 2002 and as of September 2013 had a record of 29-3 with 22 knockouts. He has garnered considerable fanfare due to his appearances on ESPN's fight cards. His first loss was against Jose Hernandez on December 16, 2006, on HBO. He lost to IBF World Featherweight Champ Robert Guerrero in a title match on Leap Day, February 29, 2008.

=== Jose Hernandez contest ===
Litzau was upset in his first spotlight appearance on HBO's Boxing After Dark in a fight against Jose Hernandez. The fight was intended to showcase Litzau's considerable talent and box office draw. Litzau was ahead on points (68-64 on all three cards) when Hernandez scored an eighth-round knockout over Litzau with a clubbing right hand to the head. Litzau had been dropped by a right hand in round one, but appeared well in control of the bout until getting knocked out in round 8.

=== IBF Featherweight Championship ===
Litzau lost via 8th-round TKO to Robert Guerrero in his first shot at the title, on February 29, 2008.

==== NABF Lightweight Championship ====
On August 15, 2009, as an undercard to Roy Jones Jr. vs. Jeff Lacy, Litzau fought Verquan Kimbrough for the vacant NABF Lightweight title. Litzau won by RTD at the end of Round 3. Litzau moved up two weight classes for the fight.

==== NABF Super Featherweight Championship ====
On November 4, 2009 Litzau headlined an ESPN2 Friday Night Fights program against 15-4 Johnnie Edwards with the NABF Super Featherweight title in play. Litzau won the fight by unanimous decision, winning a second NABF title.

Litzau defended his title against Rocky Juarez on April 3, 2010, winning by technical decision when the fight was halted in the seventh round due to a bad cut on Litzau's cheek which referee Jay Nady ruled was caused by an accidental head butt.

On the undercard of Juan Manuel Marquez vs. Michael Katsidis, Liztau beat former WBA and IBF champion, Panama's Celestino Caballero.

== Professional boxing record ==
29 Wins (21 knockouts), 3 Losses, 0 Draw
Res.	Record	Opponent	Type	Rd., Time	Date	Venue and Location	Notes
Win	29-3-0	(United States) Ira Terry	KO	1 (18)	2012-06-16	(United States) Hyatt Regency Hotel, Minneapolis, Minnesota, U.S.	vacant WBC USNBC super featherweight title
Loss	28-3-0	(United States) Adrien Broner	TKO	1 (10)	2011-06-18	Arena VFG, Tlajomulco de Zúñiga, Mexico	vacant WBC USNBC super featherweight title
Win	28-2-0	(Panama) Celestino Caballero	SD	10 (10)	2010-11-27	MGM Grand, Las Vegas, Nevada, U.S.	
Win	27-2-0	(United States) Rocky Juarez	TD	7 (3:00)	2010-04-03	Mandalay Bay, Las Vegas, Nevada, U.S.	Defended his NABF Super Featherweight title
Win	26-2-0	(United States) Johnnie Edwards	UD	10 (10)	2009-11-04	Corrosion Hangar, Camp Lejuene, North Carolina, U.S.	Won the vacant NABF Super Featherweight title
Win	25-2-0	(United States) Verquan Kimbrough	RTD	3 (3:00)	2009-08-15	Coast Coliseum, Biloxi, Mississippi, U.S.	Won the vacant NABF Lightweight title
Win	24-2-0	(United States) Phillip Payne	TKO	5 (0:52)	2009-04-18	Target Center, Minneapolis, Minnesota, U.S.	
Loss	23-2-0	(United States) Robert Guerrero	KO	8 (2:25)	2008-02-29	Tachi Palace Hotel & Casino, Lemoore, California, U.S.	For the IBF featherweight Title
Win	23-1-0	(Mexico) Edel Ruiz	UD	10 (10)	Nov 23, 2007	Staples Center, Los Angeles, California, U.S.	
Win	22-1-0	(Mexico) Emmanuel Lucero	TKO	2 (2:48)	2007-08-17	Harrah's Rincon Casino, Valley Center, California, U.S.	
Win	21-1-0	(Mexico) Aldo Valtierra	UD	10 (10)	2007-04-25	Roy Wilkins Auditorium, Saint Paul, Minnesota, U.S.	
Loss	20-1-0	(Mexico) José Hernández	KO	8 (2:52)	2006-12-16	Miccosukee Indian Gaming Resort, Miami, Florida, U.S.	
Win	20-0-0	(Mexico) Sammy Ventura	TKO	2 (10)	2006-10-20	(Minnesota) Cicero Stadium, Cicero, Illinois, U.S.	
Win	19-0-0	(Mexico) Nicky Bentz	KO	1 (10), 2:59	2006-07-14	Harrah's Rincon Casino & Resort, Valley Center, California, U.S.	
Win	18-0-0	(Nepal) Debendra Thapa	KO	2 (10), 3:00	2006-05-11	(California) Schuetzen Park, North Bergen, New Jersey, U.S.	

== See also ==
- Notable boxing families
- List of NABF champions
