= Cristian Favela =

Mexican boxer

Personal information
- Nickname: Filoso
- Born: 12 November 1979 (age 46) Los Mochis, Sinaloa, Mexico
- Height: 1.70 m (5 ft 7 in)
- Weight: Light welterweight

Boxing career
- Reach: 175 cm (69 in)
- Stance: Orthodox

Boxing record
- Total fights: 75
- Wins: 37
- Win by KO: 24
- Losses: 33
- Draws: 5

Cristian Favela (born 12 November 1979) is a Mexican former professional boxer. He is a former WBC Continental Americas featherweight champion.

== Professional career ==
On 15 October 2010, Favela knocked out the veteran Alfredo Valenzuela at the Hotel Imperial in Agua Prieta, Sonora, Mexico.

=== Professional Record ===
38 Wins (24 knockouts, 14 decisions), 32 Losses (2 knockouts, 30 decisions), 5 Draws
Res.	Record	Opponent	Type	Rd., Time	Date	Location	Notes
Loss	38-32-5	(United States) Jose Zepeda	TKO	6,2:11	2012-09-21	Mexicali, Mexico	
Loss	38-31-5	(Mexico) Pedro Campa	UD	6	2012-06-29	Arena Union, Los Mochis, Mexico	
Win	38-30-5	(Mexico) Luis Rey	PTS	6	2012-06-01	Arena Union, Los Mochis, Mexico	
Win	37-30-5	(Mexico) Alejandro Pena	TKO	2,1:38	2012-02-03	Arena Union, Los Mochis, Mexico	
Loss	36-30-5	(Mexico) Silverio Ortiz	UD	10	2011-10-15	Plaza de Toros Monumental Aviles, Motul, Mexico	
Win	36-29-5	(Mexico) Daniel Eduardo Yocupicio	UD	6	2011-09-30	Auditorio Luis Estrada Medina, Guasave, Mexico	
Win	35-29-5	(Mexico) Roberto Vera Ibarra	TKO	2	2011-07-09	Gimnasio Marcelino Gonzalez, Zacatecas City, Mexico	
Win	34-29-5	(Mexico) Carlos Urrea	TKO	3	2011-06-04	Gimnasio Municipal, Agua Prieta, Mexico	
Loss	33-29-5	(United States) Mauricio Herrera	UD	8	2011-04-29	(United States) Doubletree Hotel, Ontario, California, U.S.	
Loss	33-28-5	(United States) Jessie Vargas	UD	8	2011-02-24	(United States) Club Nokia, Los Angeles, California, U.S.	
Loss	33-27-5	(United States) Alan Sanchez	UD	8	2011-01-07	(United States) Sports Center, Fairfield, California, U.S.	
Win	33-26-5	(Mexico) Alfredo Valenzuela	KO	2	2010-10-15	Hotel Imperial, Agua Prieta, Mexico	
Draw	32-26-5	(United States) Lanardo Tyner	MD	8	2010-09-17	(United States) Parking Lot 7 at LA Live, Los Angeles, California, U.S.	
Loss	32-26-4	(Ghana) Abdullai Amidu	UD	6	2010-08-20	(United States) Casino Del Sol, Tucson, Arizona, U.S.	
Loss	32-25-4	(United States) Anthony Martinez	SD	4	2010-08-13	(United States) Sports Arena, Pico Rivera, California, U.S.	
Loss	32-24-4	(Armenia) Art Hovhannisyan	UD	8	2010-07-17	(United States) Agua Caliente Casino, Rancho Mirage, California, U.S.	
Loss	32-23-4	(Mexico) Luis Grajeda	UD	6	2010-06-11	(United States) Four Points Sheraton Hotel, San Diego, California, U.S.	
Win	32-22-4	(Mexico) Sergio Dario Cabrera	UD	6	2010-04-30	Club de Veteranos, Sinaloa de Leyva, Mexico	
Loss	31-22-4	(Venezuela) Patrick Lopez	UD	8	2010-04-23	(United States) Doubletree Hotel, Ontario, California, U.S.	
Win	31-21-4	(Mexico) Jose Montes	UD	6	2010-04-16	Dubay Discoteque, Guasave, Mexico	
Loss	30-21-4	(Philippines) Mercito Gesta	UD	8	2010-02-25	(United States) Four Points Sheraton Hotel, San Diego, California, U.S.	
Loss	30-20-4	(United States) Hector Serrano	UD	6	2010-01-22	(United States) Doubletree Hotel, Ontario, California, U.S.	
Loss	30-19-4	(Uganda) Sharif Bogere	UD	6	2009-12-17	(United States) Commerce Casino, Commerce, California, U.S.	
Loss	30-18-4	(United States) Luis Ramos Jr	UD	6	2009-09-24	(United States) Club Nokia, Los Angeles, California, U.S.	
Loss	30-17-4	(United States) Donaldo Holguin	UD	10	2009-08-29	(United States) Two Rivers Convention Center, Grand Junction, Colorado, U.S.	
Loss	30-16-4	(United States) Hector Alatorre	UD	6	2009-07-16	(United States) Tachi Palace Hotel & Casino, Lemoore, California, U.S.	
Win	30-15-4	(Mexico) Roberto Vera Ibarra	TKO	2	2009-03-07	Ocotlán, Mexico	
Loss	29-15-4	(United States) Danny García	UD	8	2009-02-28	(United States) Toyota Center, Houston, Texas, U.S.	
Loss	29-14-4	(Mexico) Juan Carlos Salgado	UD	6	2009-01-24	(United States) Staples Center, Los Angeles, California, U.S.	
Win	29-13-4	(Mexico) Jorge Romero	SD	10	2008-12-05	Parque Revolucion, Culiacán, Mexico	
Loss	28-13-4	(Philippines) Mercito Gesta	UD	8	2008-11-07	(United States) Casino Del Sol, Tucson, Arizona, U.S.	
Draw	28-12-4	(Mexico) Noe Bolanos	TD	1	2008-10-13	Ciudad Obregón, Mexico	Accidental head clash cuts Favela
Win	28-12-3	(Mexico) Efren Guerrero	SD	10	2008-07-18	Auditorio Benito Juarez, Los Mochis, Mexico	
Win	27-12-3	(Mexico) Valente Rojas	KO	4	2008-06-28	Sociedad Mutualista, Huatabampo, Mexico	
Loss	26-12-3	(United States) Vicente Escobedo	UD	8	2008-06-18	(United States) Arco Arena, Sacramento, California, U.S.	
Loss	26-11-3	(Puerto Rico) Román Martínez	UD	10	2008-04-25	Coliseo Antonio R. Barcelo, Toa Baja, Puerto Rico	
Win	26-10-3	(Mexico) Miguel Angel Lopez	UD	10	2008-04-18	Auditorio Benito Juarez, Los Mochis, Mexico	
Win	25-10-3	(Mexico) Sergio Rivera	UD	10	2008-02-29	Forum del Mayo, Navojoa, Mexico	
Loss	24-10-3	(Mexico) Ramon Montano	SD	10	2007-10-05	(United States) Cliff Castle Casino, Camp Verde, Arizona, U.S.	
Win	24-9-3	(Mexico) Oscar Espinoza	KO	4,2:33	2007-10-05	San José del Cabo, Mexico	
Loss	23-9-3	(Mexico) Zaid Zavaleta	KO	9,1:25	2007-08-18	Coliseo Olimpico de la UG, Guadalajara, Mexico	
Win	23-8-3	(Mexico) Orlando Escobar	SD	8	2007-05-04	Culiacán, Mexico	
Loss	22-8-3	(United States) Wes Ferguson	UD	8	2006-12-14	(United States) Tachi Palace Hotel & Casino, Lemoore, California, U.S.	
Loss	22-7-3	(United States) David Díaz	UD	12	2006-06-16	(United States) Cicero Stadium, Cicero, Illinois, U.S.	For IBA lightweight title
Loss	22-6-3	(Philippines) Czar Amonsot	UD	8	2006-02-03	(United States) Orleans Hotel & Casino, Paradise, Nevada, U.S.	
Draw	22-5-3	(Mexico) Efren Hinojosa	SD	8	2005-12-02	(United States) Feather Falls Casino, Oroville, California, U.S.	
Draw	22-5-2	(Mexico) Baudel Cardenas	MD	10	2005-06-17	Auditorio Benito Juarez, Los Mochis, Mexico	
Loss	22-5-1	(Mexico) Javier Jáuregui	UD	10	2005-02-04	(United States) UNF Arena, Jacksonville, Florida, U.S.	
Loss	22-4-1	(United States) Steve Luevano	UD	10	2004-10-08	(United States) Edgewater Hotel & Casino, Laughlin, Nevada, U.S.	
Win	22-3-1	(Mexico) Juan Ruiz	KO	6,1:44	2004-09-17	Club 20-30, Los Mochis, Mexico	
Loss	21-3-1	(Mexico) Marcos Licona	MD	10	2004-03-18	(United States) Marriott Hotel, Irvine, California, U.S.	
Win	21-2-1	(United States) Willie Jorrin	MD	10	2003-11-06	(United States) Celebrity Theater, Phoenix, Arizona, U.S.	
Loss	20-2-1	(United States) Priest Smalls	UD	12	2003-07-17	(United States) Grand Arena, City of Industry, California, U.S.	For vacant WBO Inter-Continental featherweight title
Win	20-1-1	(United States) Phillip Payne	UD	12	2003-05-05	(United States) Municipal Auditorium, Shreveport, Louisiana, U.S.	Won WBC Continental Americas featherweight title
Win	19-1-1	(Mexico) Martin Fing	UD	10	2002-10-04	Culiacán, Mexico	
Win	18-1-1	(Mexico) José Herrera	KO	5	2002-05-17	Auditorio Benito Juarez, Los Mochis, Mexico	
Win	17-1-1	(Mexico) Felix Bojorquez	KO	4	2002-02-22	Auditorio Benito Juarez, Los Mochis, Mexico	
Win	16-1-1	(Mexico) Horacio Rosas	TKO	6	2001-11-24	Forum del Mayo, Navojoa, Mexico	
Draw	15-1-1	(Mexico) Victor Manuel Dominguez	PTS	10	2001-11-01	Mexico	
Loss	15-1	(Mexico) Martin Honorio	UD	10	2001-09-22	Arena Mexico, Mexico City, Mexico	
Win	15-0	(Mexico) Jose Salomon	RTD	8	2001-08-03	Gimnasio Municipal, Ciudad Obregón, Mexico	Salomon abandoned by hand injury
Win	14-0	(Mexico) Mauricio Borquez	TKO	1,1:34	2001-04-27	Auditorio Benito Juarez, Los Mochis, Mexico	
Win	13-0	(Mexico) Leobardo Roman	TKO	6	2001-03-30	Auditorio Benito Juarez, Los Mochis, Mexico	
Win	12-0	(Mexico) Saul Lopez	RTD	1	2001-02-16	Los Mochis, Mexico	
Win	11-0	(Mexico) Abel Sepulveda	KO	1	2000-09-08	Auditorio Benito Juarez, Los Mochis, Mexico	
Win	10-0	(Mexico) Tomas Jurado	KO	1,1:20	2000-07-28	Auditorio Benito Juarez, Los Mochis, Mexico	
Win	9-0	(Mexico) Eliseo Valdez	TKO	4	2000-06-02	Auditorio Benito Juarez, Los Mochis, Mexico	
Win	8-0	(Mexico) Daniel Hinojosa	TKO	5	2000-05-19	Auditorio Benito Juarez, Los Mochis, Mexico	
Win	7-0	(Mexico) Emir Hernandez	TKO	3	1999-07-16	Culiacán, Mexico	
Win	6-0	(Mexico) Noe Acosta	KO	3	1999-06-04	Mexico	
Win	5-0	(Mexico) Jose Salomon	KO	5	1998-10-16	Mexico	
Win	4-0	(Mexico) Jesus Armenta	TKO	2	1998-06-19	Mexico	
Win	3-0	(Mexico) Victor Armenta	PTS	4	1998-04-29	Mexico	
Win	2-0	(Mexico) Domingo Espinoza	DQ	4	1998-03-27	Mexico	
Win	1-0	(Mexico) Genaro Valencia	TKO	2	1998-01-30	Auditorio Benito Juarez, Los Mochis, Mexico	
