= Silverio Ortiz =

Mexican boxer

Personal information
- Nickname: Chamaco III
- Born: Silverio José Ortiz Ley; 17 December 1982 (age 43) Chicxulub, Yucatán, Mexico
- Height: 1.74 m (5 ft 9 in)
- Weight: Welterweight; Light welterweight

Boxing career
- Reach: 179 cm (70 in)
- Stance: Orthodox

Boxing record
- Total fights: 66
- Wins: 37
- Win by KO: 18
- Losses: 29
- Draws: 0
- No contests: 0

Silverio José Ortiz Ley (born 17 December 1982) is a Mexican professional boxer. Silverio is the current IBA light welterweight Champion. He is married with four children.

== Early life ==
Ortiz was born in Chicxulub, Yucatán and is the grandson of a Chinese immigrant. After taking up boxing, he became the Yucatán amateur champion before turning pro.

== Professional career ==
In April 2005, Ortiz beat an undefeated Ricardo Dominguez at the Dodge Arena in Hidalgo, Texas.

On 1 May 2010 Ortiz beat title contender Fernando Angulo to win the IBA light welterweight title.

== Professional boxing record ==
26 Wins (12 knockouts, 14 decisions), 13 Losses (4 knockouts, 9 decisions), 0 Draws
Res.	Record	Opponent	Type	Rd., Time	Date	Location	Notes
Win	26-13	(Mexico) Oscar Tinajero	RTD	7	2012-05-11	Arena Auditorio de la CMT, Mérida, Yucatán, Mexico	
Win	25-13	(Mexico) Mahonri Montes	UD	8	2012-03-31	Poliforum Zamna, Mérida, Yucatán, Mexico	
Win	24-13	(Mexico) Cristian Favela	UD	10	2011-10-15	Plaza de Toros Monumental Aviles, Motul, Yucatán, Mexico	
Win	23-13	(Mexico) Efren Hinojosa	KO	2,1:56	2011-02-19	Poliforum Zamna, Mérida, Yucatán, Mexico	Retained IBA light welterweight title
Win	22-13	(Nicaragua) Elvin Perez	KO	2,1:17	2010-10-16	Poliforum Zamna, Mérida, Yucatán, Mexico	Retained IBA light welterweight title
Win	21-13	(Colombia) Fernando Angulo	UD	12	2010-05-01	Poliforum Zamna, Mérida, Yucatán, Mexico	Won vacant IBA light welterweight title
Loss	20-13	(Canada) Herman Ngoudjo	TKO	6,1:43	2010-02-06	Montreal Casino, Montreal, Quebec, Canada	
Win	20-12	(Mexico) Moises Perez	UD	6	2009-10-31	Deportivo La Inalámbrica, Mérida, Yucatán, Mexico	
Loss	19-12	(Argentina) Marcos Rene Maidana	KO	2,2:04	2008-11-01	Koenig Pilsener Arena, Oberhausen, Germany	
Loss	19-11	(Puerto Rico) Jose Reyes	UD	12	2007-09-14	(United States) Kissimmee Civic Center, Kissimmee, Florida	For WBO Latino lightweight title
Win	19-10	(Mexico) Mario Alberto Mondragon	TKO	3,2:39	2007-06-16	Centro de Convenciones Siglo XXI, Mérida, Yucatán, Mexico	
Win	18-10	(Mexico) Alfredo Hernandez	TKO	2,0:50	2007-02-03	Camara de Comercio, Mérida, Yucatán, Mexico	
Loss	17-10	(Philippines) Czar Amonsot	UD	10	2006-07-02	Araneta Coliseum, Quezon City, Philippines	
Win	17-9	(Mexico) Miguel Angel Huerta	UD	8	2006-04-08	(United States) Apache Gold Casino, Globe, Arizona	
Loss	16-9	(United States) David Díaz	UD	10	2006-03-17	(United States) Aragon Ballroom, Chicago, Illinois	
Loss	16-8	(United States) Wes Ferguson	UD	8	19 Nov 2005	(United States) Rose Garden, Portland, Oregon	
Win	16-7	(Mexico) Gerardo Valdez	TKO	1	2005-10-15	Domo de la Macroplaza, Nogales, Sonora, Mexico	
Win	15-7	(Puerto Rico) Daniel Seda	UD	10	2005-08-02	(United States) Union Station, Kansas City, Missouri	
Win	14-7	(Mexico) Ricardo Dominguez	UD	8	2005-04-22	(United States) Dodge Arena, Hidalgo, Texas	
Loss	13-7	(Colombia) William Morelo	TKO	5,3:00	2004-11-05	(United States) Plaza Hotel & Casino, Las Vegas, Nevada	
Loss	13-6	(United States) Eleazar Contreras Jr	UD	12	2004-05-06	(United States) Anatole Hotel, Dallas, Texas	For IBA lightweight title
Loss	13-5	(Mexico) José Luis Soto Karass	MD	8	2004-04-03	(United States) Grand Arena, City of Industry, California	
Loss	13-4	(United States) Mike Anchondo	TKO	4,3:00	2003-09-18	(United States) Santa Ana Stadium, Santa Ana, California	For WBC Youth super featherweight title Ringside doctor advised referee to stop the fight after 4th round
Loss	13-3	(United States) Stevie Forbes	UD	10	2003-04-26	(United States) Stratosphere Hotel & Casino, Las Vegas, Nevada	
Loss	13-2	(Mexico) Jorge Páez	TD	7,2:44	2003-02-07	(United States) HP Pavilion, San Jose, California	Paez knocked out by unintentional blow from Ortiz while the referee was separating the fighters. To decide the outcome of the fight, the decision was made using the scorecards
Win	13-1	(Mexico) Tomas Santos Serrano	TKO	12	2002-02-23	Mérida, Yucatán, Mexico	Won South-East super featherweight title
Win	12-1	(Mexico) Luis Couoh	MD	12	2002-01-26	Valladolid, Yucatán, Mexico	Retained Yucatán State lightweight title
Win	11-1	(Mexico) Juan Carlos Chan	TKO	3	2001-12-01	Chicxulub, Yucatán, Mexico	Won vacant Yucatán State lightweight title
Win	10-1	(Mexico) Francisco Guillen	SD	8	2001-10-05	Mérida, Yucatán, Mexico	
Win	9-1	(Mexico) Manuel Carballo	UD	10	2001-09-14	Chicxulub, Yucatán, Mexico	
Win	8-1	(Mexico) Melvin Cepeda	UD	8	2001-07-01	Conkal, Yucatán, Mexico	
Win	7-1	(Mexico) Ramon Perez	PTS	8	2001-04-06	Mexico	
Win	6-1	(Mexico) Jose Luis Cob	KO	3	2001-03-01	Chicxulub, Yucatán, Mexico	
Win	5-1	(Mexico) Luis Couoh	UD	8	2001-01-26	Chicxulub, Yucatán, Mexico	
Loss	4-1	(Mexico) Manuel Estrella	SD	8	2000-10-14	Arena Santiago, Mérida, Yucatán, Mexico	
Win	4-0	(Mexico) Samuel Lemus	KO	3	2000-08-18	Chetumal, Quintana Roo, Mexico	
Win	2-0	(Mexico) Luis Couoh	TKO	3	2000-04-14	Poliforum Zamna, Mérida, Yucatán, Mexico	
Win	1-0	(Mexico) Manuel Montero	TKO	1	2000-03-18	Poliforum Zamna, Mérida, Yucatán, Mexico	
