= Bernard Hopkins vs. Winky Wright =

Boxing match

Coming to Fight
- Date: July 21, 2007
- Venue: Mandalay Bay Events Center, Paradise, Nevada, U.S.
- Title(s) on the line: The Ring light heavyweight title

Tale of the tape
Boxer	Bernard Hopkins	Ronald Wright
Nickname	The Executioner	Winky
Hometown	Philadelphia, Pennsylvania, U.S.	Washington, D.C., U.S.
Purse	$3,000,000	$2,000,000
Pre-fight record	47–4–1 (1) (32 KO)	51–3–1 (25 KO)
Age	42 years, 6 months	35 years, 7 months
Height	6 ft 1 in (185 cm)	5 ft 10 1/2 in (179 cm)
Weight	170 lb (77 kg)	170 lb (77 kg)
Style	Orthodox	Southpaw
Recognition	The Ring; Light Heavyweight Champion; WBO; No. 1 Ranked Light Heavyweight	WBC/The Ring; No. 2 Ranked Middleweight; IBF/WBO; No. 3 Ranked Middleweight; WBA; No. 4 Ranked Middleweight; 2-time light middleweight champion

Result
- Hopkins wins via unanimous decision (117–111, 117–111, 116–112)

Bernard Hopkins vs. Winky Wright, billed as Coming to Fight, was a professional boxing match contested on July 21, 2007, for The Ring light heavyweight title.

== Background ==
Bernard Hopkins had announced his retirement after defeating Antonio Tarver in dominating fashion to capture The Ring light heavyweight title the previous year. Despite his impressive performance, Hopkins was adamant during the immediate aftermath that his boxing career was over as he had promised his now-deceased mother he would retire after moving up from middleweight to capture the light heavyweight title. However, Hopkins would announce his comeback only eight months later to face former 2-time light middleweight champion Ronald "Winky" Wright. With Wright having never fought past the middleweight limit of 160 pounds and Hopkins now fighting two divisions above at the 175-pound light heavyweight limit, the two fighters agreed to a catchweight of 170 pounds. As both fighters were known more for their defensive skills rather than their knockout prowess, many boxing pundits, including Teddy Atlas and Angelo Dundee, predicted the fight would be a slow, tactical affair.

At the pre-fight weigh-in, Hopkins and Wright were fact-to-face exchanging words when Hopkins suddenly shoved Wright, causing a melee between both of their entourages. The Nevada State Athletic Commission announced that they would withhold 10 percent of Hopkins' $3 million purse pending a hearing on the matter. One month later a five-person panel reduced the fine to 6 percent or $200,000.

== The fight ==
Hopkins, using his constant movement and superior defense, completely neutralized Wright's best punch, his right jab, holding Wright to just 87 of 290, while often countering with combinations to the body which weakened Wright as the fight went on. The turning point of the fight came in the second round when Hopkins headbutted Wright opening a large gash near his left eye which hindered him throughout the fight and which Hopkins targeted frequently. Hopkins was not penalized for the butt but was warned for rubbing his head again Wrights whenever the two were engaged in a clinch. After 12 rounds, Hopkins would earn a relatively lopsided unanimous decision victory with all three judges naming him the winner with two scores of 117–111 and one score of 116–112, giving Wright his first defeat in over 7 years.

HBO's Harold Lederman scored the bout a draw, 114–114, while the Associated Press scored the bout 115–113 for Hopkins.

== Aftermath ==
The card generated between 300,000 and 330,000 buys on HBO.

== Fight card ==
Confirmed bouts:

Weight Class	Weight		vs.		Method	Round	Notes
Catchweight	170 lbs.	Bernard Hopkins (c)	def	Ronald Wright	UD	12/12	^{Note 1}
Featherweight	126 lbs.	Jorge Linares	def.	Óscar Larios	TKO	10/12	^{Note 2}
Lightweight	135 lbs.	Michael Katsidis (c)	def.	Czar Amonsot	UD	12/12	^{Note 3}
Super Lightweight	140 lbs.	Demetrius Hopkins	def.	Jailer Berrio	TKO	1/10
Light Heavyweight	175 lbs.	Librado Andrade	def.	Ted Muller	TKO	2/8
Middleweight	160 lbs.	Jose Angel Rodriguez	def.	Keenan Collins	SD	8/8
Welterweight	147 lbs.	Rock Allen	def.	Ramiro Rivera	UD	6/6
Featherweight	126 lbs.	Juan Domínguez	def.	Manuel Gonzalez Garcia	MD	4/4

^Note 1 For The Ring light heavyweight title
^Note 2 For WBC Featherweight title
^Note 3 For WBO Interim lightweight title

== Broadcasting ==
Country	Broadcaster
Australia	Main Event
Canada	Viewers Choice
United Kingdom	Sky Sports
United States	HBO

Preceded by vs. Antonio Tarver	Bernard Hopkins's bouts 21 July 2007	Succeeded by vs. Joe Calzaghe
Preceded by vs. Ike Quartey	Winky Wright's bouts 21 July 2007	Succeeded by vs. Paul Williams
