= Michael Katsidis =

Australian boxer

Michael Katsidis Μιχάλης Κατσίδης
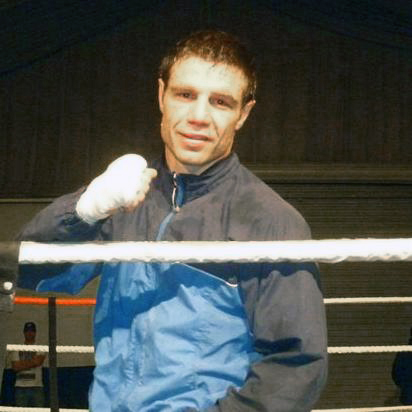
- Katsidis in 2011

Personal information
- Nicknames: The Great; Rocky
- Nationality: Australian
- Born: Michael Alan Katsidis; 15 August 1980 (age 46) Toowoomba, Queensland, Australia
- Height: 1.70 m (5 ft 7 in)
- Weight: Lightweight; Light-welterweight; Welterweight

Boxing career
- Reach: 168 cm (66 in)
- Stance: Orthodox

Boxing record
- Total fights: 41
- Wins: 33
- Win by KO: 24
- Losses: 8

Michael Alan Katsidis (/kætˈsiːdiːz/ kat-SEE-deez; Greek: Μιχάλης Κατσίδης; born 15 August 1980) is an Australian former professional boxer who competed from 2001 to 2017. He held the World Boxing Organization (WBO) interim lightweight title twice between 2007 and 2010, and challenged twice for the lineal lightweight title in 2008 and 2010. At the peak of his career in the late 2000s, Katsidis' crowd-pleasing and aggressive pressure fighting style often drew comparisons with the late Arturo Gatti.

== Amateur career ==
In an amateur career which began at the age of 11, Katsidis compiled a record of 75 wins and 6 losses. During this time he represented the Australian Olympic team in the lightweight division at the 2000 Olympics in Sydney. He also attained a scholarship at the Australian Institute of Sport.

=== 2000 Olympic results ===
- First round: defeated Agnaldo Nunes – 15:6
- Second round: lost to Nurzhan Karimzhanov – 7:9

== Professional career ==
=== 2001–2007: early years ===
Katsidis made his professional debut on 1 December 2001 by stopping Danny Wilson in the third round for the Queensland lightweight title. In his second fight on 9 March 2002, he won a twelve-round unanimous decision over James Swan for the Australian lightweight championship. He would go on to score another nineteen wins, nearly all by knockout, while amassing a further three lower-level titles: the Australian light-welterweight, WBO Asia Pacific lightweight and IBF Pan Pacific lightweight championships, respectively.

In 2001, Katsidis was convicted for assault after getting involved in an altercation with a man and breaking his jaw. Katsidis pleaded not guilty, maintaining self-defence, but was sentenced to eight months in prison between 2002 and 2003, six months of which were spent at the high-security Woodford Correctional Centre north of Brisbane. The conviction later made it difficult for Katsidis to obtain a visa to the United States, which was refused twice in 2005 and 2006.

==== Battle with Earl ====
On 17 February 2007, a bout for the newly created and vacant WBO interim lightweight title was made between Katsidis and Graham Earl at the Wembley Arena in London. In an action-packed and fast-paced fight, Katsidis and Earl went toe-to-toe and traded many heavy blows, during which Earl was knocked down twice in the opening round and again in the second. However, soon after getting back to his feet following the third knockdown and having the towel being thrown in seconds later (only for it to be thrown back out again by referee Mickey Vann), Earl managed to floor Katsidis momentarily with a heavy right hand at close quarters, rendering the latter visibly stunned and unsteady on his feet. Earl's comeback would ultimately be short-lived, as Katsidis recovered swiftly and finished the round strongly. At the very end of round three, a low blow cost Katsidis a point, but in the following rounds he went on to deliver a barrage of largely unanswered punches to Earl until the decision was made Earl's cornermen to stop the fight after the fifth round.

==== United States debut ====
Katsidis was scheduled to face then-WBO super featherweight champion Joan Guzmán on 26 May 2007, but the latter withdrew from the fight due to a hand injury. Katsidis later defended his WBO interim lightweight title against Czar Amonsot on 21 July 2007 at the Mandalay Bay Events Center in Las Vegas, Nevada. This was Katsidis' first fight in the United States, as well as the first of his many appearances on the HBO network, as part of the pay-per-view undercard to Bernard Hopkins vs. Winky Wright.

Both boxers would go on to wage an intense, bloody war over the twelve-round distance. Amonsot proved to be a tough and durable opponent, despite suffering knockdowns in rounds two and ten. The judges' scorecards ultimately read 116–110, 115–111 and 114–112 for Katsidis, but both men were subsequently hospitalised at the local Valley Hospital Medical Center, with Amonsot requiring an overnight stay and Katsidis multiple stitches for serious cuts around his eyes, which had begun to bleed heavily from the third round onwards. Amonsot was later found to have a subdural hematoma, putting his career in serious doubt at the time.

=== 2008 ===
==== First defeat ====
A bout with then-IBF/WBA/WBO lightweight champion Juan Díaz was to take place after the fight with Amonsot, but problems with HBO and Díaz's promoter Don King prevented this from occurring. On 22 March at the Morongo Casino, Resort & Spa in Cabazon, California, Katsidis fought reigning WBC and The Ring magazine lightweight champion Joel Casamayor.

The Cuban southpaw got off to a good start by catching Katsidis early on with sharp left hands, dropping him twice in the first round. As the fight continued, Katsidis' harder punches and constant pressure began to find their way through Casamayor's defence, at one point sending him tumbling through the ring ropes towards the end of round six, after successive left and right hands by Katsidis. In the ninth round, Casamayor was docked a point due to a low blow. All of this enabled Katsidis to gradually build up a lead on two of the judges' scorecards, until a well-placed counter left hand from Casamayor caught him on the chin in the tenth round, flooring him for a fourth time. Barely able to stand up, Katsidis was able to carry on but shortly afterwards a further flurry of unanswered shots from Casamayor forced referee Jon Schorle to stop the fight. This handed Katsidis his first defeat and cost him the WBO interim lightweight title. Again, cuts and bruises were noticeable around his eyes after the fight.

==== Second defeat ====
Following the defeat, a rescheduled fight with Juan Díaz was set for 6 September at the Toyota Center in Houston, Texas, for the vacant IBO lightweight championship. Over the course of twelve rounds, Katsidis underperformed and enabled a determined Díaz (who had himself suffered a career first loss in his previous fight) to counterpunch and time his attacks with regularity. His face bloodied and bruised once again, Katsidis suffered his second consecutive defeat, with Díaz winning a split decision. Two of the judges scored the fight 116–112 and 115–113 for Díaz, while the third scored it a somewhat controversial 115–113 for Katsidis.

=== 2009 ===
==== Comeback trail ====
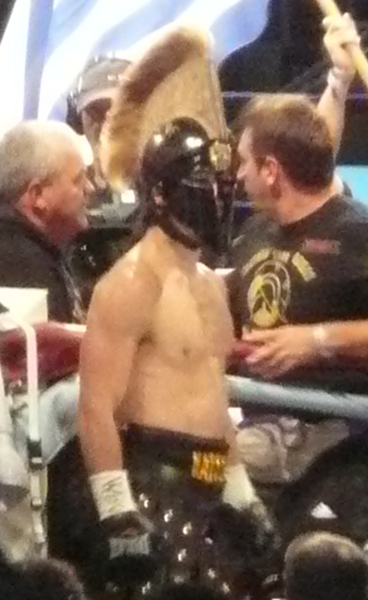
Katsidis wearing his signature helmet and trunks before entering the ring, 2010

An opportunity for Katsidis to reclaim the vacant WBO Asia Pacific lightweight title was scheduled for 31 January at the Cebu Coliseum in Cebu City, Philippines, with Angel Hugo Ramirez as his opponent. The ten-round contest was won convincingly by Katsidis, despite appearing to be gunshy at times, coupled with Ramirez's unwillingness to engage. Ramirez was knocked down four times (once in the second round and three times in the fourth), while a point was deducted from Katsidis for hitting Ramirez when he was floored from a slip later in the second round. At the end of the fight, the judges scored 98–87, 96–89 and 96–89 in favour of Katsidis.

On 4 April, Katsidis faced Jesús Chávez at the Frank Erwin Center in Austin, Texas. This was part of the Lightweight Lightning event, a lightweight eliminator tournament organised by Golden Boy Promotions. After an initially tentative start by Katsidis, he was soon able to pull ahead on the scorecards due to his characteristic onslaught of attack, which ultimately forced Chávez (who had sustained a bad cut on his forehead towards the end of round four) to quit in his corner before the start of the eighth round.

==== Pay-per-view return ====
Katsidis' next opponent was Vicente Escobedo, whom he fought on 19 September at the MGM Grand Garden Arena in Las Vegas, as part of the undercard to Floyd Mayweather Jr. vs. Juan Manuel Márquez. The bout was for the WBO interim lightweight title (which had since been vacated by Joel Casamayor, some time following his victorious bout with Katsidis), with the winner receiving a guaranteed opportunity to face the WBO lightweight world champion.

In a fight similar to the one with Amonsot two years prior, Katsidis and Escobedo exchanged hard punches for the full twelve rounds, with Katsidis surging forward aggressively and putting constant pressure on the retreating yet accurately counterpunching Escobedo. As per routine, cuts opened up around Katsidis' face early on, together with a visibly swollen jaw in the closing rounds. At the end of the contest, the judges were split with 118–110 and 115–113 for Katsidis and 116–112 for Escobedo.

=== 2010 ===
==== Return to London ====
Having reclaimed the interim title, Katsidis was made to wait several months to see if a mandatory title bout with Juan Manuel Márquez would materialise. This was dependent on whether Márquez was willing return to the lightweight division to defend his WBO championship, or if he would voluntarily relinquish it to Katsidis in favour of moving up to light-welterweight for potentially bigger fights. By January 2010, Márquez had not yet expressed any desire to defend against Katsidis.

A date on 27 March against then-reigning IBF super featherweight champion Robert Guerrero was at one point confirmed for a Golden Boy Promotions event, but Guerrero withdrew from the fight in early February due to family matters. One day prior to Guerrero's withdrawal, Katsidis had turned his attention towards old nemesis Juan Díaz, with both expressing an interest in a potential rematch.

On 2 March, a fight between Katsidis and then-undefeated lightweight challenger Kevin Mitchell was officially confirmed by promoter Frank Warren. It was contested on 15 May at Boleyn Ground stadium in London, with the WBO interim lightweight title on the line. At the opening bell, Mitchell looked to establish his jab and keep Katsidis at bay. In the first two evenly split rounds, the occasional flurry of hooks from a highly aggressive Katsidis was enough to make Mitchell fight consistently on the back foot in an attempt to keep out of range. However, in the closing seconds of both rounds, Katsidis was able to launch a charging attack and finish strongly at the bell. In the third round, Katsidis continued to charge at Mitchell and was soon able to land a combination of hooks which made the latter stumble backwards on unsteady legs. From thereon, Mitchell was unable to fully regain his composure and, less than two minutes later, he was buckled by a hard left hook and a further succession of unanswered punches, at which point referee Dave Parris stopped the fight.

==== The waiting game ====
Immediately after the Mitchell bout, the WBO mandated that Juan Manuel Márquez must face Katsidis for the 'full' version of the lightweight world championship, or risk being stripped. This was reiterated some months later, following Márquez's victory over Juan Díaz in a rematch of their 2009 fight. Katsidis was in attendance for the aforementioned event in order to scout out the winner and primarily to assert his claim to be next in line against Márquez.

==== World title challenge ====
On 25 August the CEO of Golden Boy Promotions, Richard Schaefer, announced that Márquez had decided to stay at lightweight and defend his unified WBA, WBO, Ring, and lineal titles against Katsidis on 27 November at the MGM Grand. Golden Boy Promotions founder Oscar De La Hoya titled the event as Warriors, and it was to be Katsidis' first time headlining an HBO World Championship Boxing broadcast (having twice previously headlined HBO's Boxing After Dark, against Casamayor and Díaz). Tragedy occurred during Katsidis' pre-fight preparation and training in Thailand, when his brother Stathi Katsidis died on 19 October.

In what many observers were anticipating to be a highly fan-friendly fight, Márquez suffered a knockdown in round three from a hard Katsidis left hook. He managed to recover swiftly, building up a lead on all the judges' scorecards and gradually neutralising Katsidis' aggression with accurate counterpunching at close range. In the ninth round, Márquez landed a succession of cleanly landed uppercuts on an unsteady Katsidis (who had already been staggered by an uppercut in the eighth), prompting referee Kenny Bayless to step in and halt the fight. Despite a third defeat for Katsidis, the fight went on to win HBO's award for 2010 Fight of the Year.

=== 2011: further losses ===
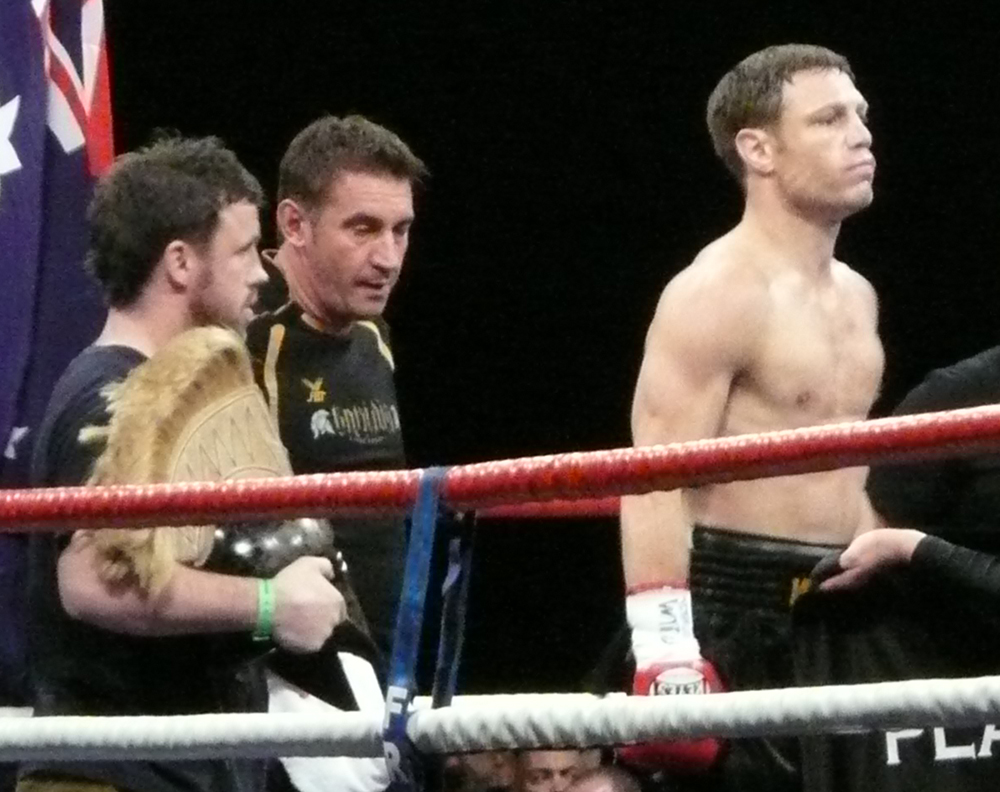
Katsidis (right) with Brendon Smith (centre) and Graham Earl (left), 2011

Katsidis' next fight took place on 9 April 2011 against Robert Guerrero, in a rescheduling of their cancelled fight from March 2010. Staged at the MGM Grand, it formed part of the pay-per-view undercard to Érik Morales vs. Marcos Maidana. The WBA and, once again, WBO interim titles were at stake. Despite an animated taunt of "What are you looking at?!" from Katsidis to Guerrero during their pre-fight staredown, a fourth career defeat would await Katsidis in his most one-sided to date. Guerrero was able to maintain a safe distance by consistently landing accurate punches with his jab and straight left hand, to which Katsidis had virtually no answer at any stage in the fight.

In the second round, Katsidis seemingly scored a knockdown due to a cuffing left hook, but this was not counted by referee Russell Mora. In the fourth, both fighters exchanged punches wildly, with Guerrero maintaining the upper hand. A hard straight left from Guerrero wobbled Katsidis in round five and had him hurt for the remainder of the round. As the fight wore on, Katsidis would lose two points in the eighth round because of repeated low blows; Guerrero also lost a point for the same reason in the ninth. With all twelve rounds completed, the judges were unanimous in scoring 118–107, 118–106 and 117–108 for Guerrero.

Katsidis then moved up to light-welterweight for a fight against Michael Lozada on 13 August at the Gold Coast Convention and Exhibition Centre in Queensland. It was his first fight in Australia since 2006, as well as his first at light-welterweight since that time. An outmatched Lozada was stopped in the third round.

In a move back down to lightweight, Katsidis next fought Ricky Burns for the vacant WBO interim lightweight title. The event took place at the Wembley Arena in London on 5 November, making it Katsidis' third fight in England. Burns defeated Katsidis by way of unanimous decision with judges' scores of 117–112, 117–111 and 117–111.

Later that month, it was announced that Katsidis and career-long trainer Brendon Smith had amicably parted ways after nearly twenty years. In an in-depth December interview, he explained that he was on the lookout for a new manager, promoter and trainer, as well as a forthcoming fight.

=== 2012: trainer changes ===
Having hired a new trainer in fellow Australian and former heavyweight contender Justin Fortune, Katsidis moved up light-welterweight again for a fight against Albert Mensah, which took place on 13 April 2012 at the Hard Rock Hotel and Casino in Las Vegas. Despite throwing over a thousand punches in a typically action-packed outing, Katsidis was outboxed by Mensah, who landed fewer but more damaging punches (particularly the uppercut, to which Katsidis has always been vulnerable). In the ninth round, Katsidis was hurt several times and looked to be on shaky legs as he stumbled around the ring. At the end of the ten-round contest, the judges scored a majority decision for Mensah with scores of 98–92, 96–94 and 95–95.

Later in the year, Katsidis was scheduled to fight then-undefeated Darleys Pérez on 10 August at the Morongo Casino, but later withdrew on 25 July due to a knee injury. At one point during October, Katsidis was in the running for a high-profile welterweight bout against then-returning British star Ricky Hatton, but Hatton instead chose Vyacheslav Senchenko as his opponent. Katsidis later stated that from there on he would stay at lightweight, which he felt was his natural weight class. In another in-depth December interview, Katsidis revealed that he had moved back to Sydney and hired veteran trainer Johnny Lewis for future bouts.

=== 2013: health scare and inactivity ===
Katsidis' first bout of 2013 was scheduled for 21 February at the Melbourne Pavilion, against Weng Haya of the Philippines. However, on 12 February the news broke that the fight had been cancelled, with Katsidis having received medical advice based on MRI and CAT scans that he should retire. A week following the announcement, further information from the scans revealed that Katsidis had suffered scarring of the brain. In July, Katsidis expressed his desire for a farewell fight in his hometown of Toowoomba, where he had not fought since 2006. He also stated that he was medically clear to fight, while having other aspirations outside of boxing.

=== 2014: upset loss against Coyle ===
Katsidis and Brendon Smith reunited before the start of the year, with Katsidis facing Eddy Comaro on 14 March at the Convention Centre in Toowoomba. Comaro was stopped in three rounds.

A rematch with Graham Earl, whom Katsidis first fought in 2007, took place on 4 July in Toowoomba, at light-welterweight. Katsidis won a unanimous decision with scores of 120–109, 120–108 and 119–109.

On 25 October, Katsidis travelled to Hull, England to face Tommy Coyle. The fight took place at Hull Arena, in the lightweight division. Katsidis suffered his seventh career loss when he was knocked down and stopped in the second round.

== Personal life ==
Katsidis is of Greek descent, and often paid homage to his heritage by wearing a Corinthian helmet when entering the ring, as well as his trunks often resembling a warrior's skirt. He further showcases this heritage with a tattoo on his back depicting the Vergina Sun, which is the symbol of Macedonia, from where his family hails. He was a student of Downlands College.

His brother Stathi Katsidis was one of Australia's most prominent jockeys. On 19 October 2010, Stathi was found dead at his home in Brisbane.

In February 2009, Katsidis married Japanese native Kumiko Hosako during a ceremony in Bangkok. On 8 December 2009, she gave birth to a daughter.

In 2015, Katsidis was charged for possession of an ice pipe. There was no conviction recorded, but Katsidis was required to undertake drug counselling. In 2016, he was caught and subsequently charged for driving under the influence of drugs, namely methamphetamines. He was fined A$400 and a conviction was recorded. 2018 saw Katsidis back in court for allegedly switching urine samples in order to evade a urine analysis test.

Katsidis was sentenced to two years in prison with immediate parole in 2021, after pleading guilty for possession of meth during a 2019 police raid.

== Professional boxing record ==
41 fights	33 wins	8 losses
By knockout	24	3
By decision	9	5

No.	Result	Record	Opponent	Type	Round, time	Date	Location	Notes
41	Loss	33–8	Jamie Hilt	SD	3 (3)	25 Nov 2017	Rumours International, Toowoomba, Australia	Super 8 Showdown: welterweight semi-final
40	Win	33–7	Robert Toomey	SD	3 (3)	25 Nov 2017	Rumours International, Toowoomba, Australia	Super 8 Showdown: welterweight quarter-final
39	Win	32–7	Josh King	UD	8	11 Mar 2017	Rumours International, Toowoomba, Australia	
38	Win	31–7	Rodynie Rafol	UD	6	20 Mar 2015	Pavilion, Melbourne, Australia	
37	Loss	30–7	Tommy Coyle	TKO	2 (12), 1:33	25 Oct 2014	Hull Arena, Hull, England	For IBF International lightweight title
36	Win	30–6	Graham Earl	UD	12	4 Jul 2014	Rumours International, Toowoomba, Australia	For WBU light-welterweight title
35	Win	29–6	Eddy Comaro	TKO	3 (8), 1:11	14 Mar 2014	Rumours International, Toowoomba, Australia	
34	Loss	28–6	Albert Mensah	MD	10	13 Apr 2012	The Joint, Paradise, Nevada, US	For IBF International light-welterweight title
33	Loss	28–5	Ricky Burns	UD	12	5 Nov 2011	Wembley Arena, London, England	For WBO interim lightweight title
32	Win	28–4	Michael Lozada	KO	3 (10), 2:18	13 Aug 2011	Convention and Exhibition Centre, Gold Coast, Australia	
31	Loss	27–4	Robert Guerrero	UD	12	9 Apr 2011	MGM Grand Garden Arena, Paradise, Nevada, US	For WBA interim and WBO interim lightweight titles
30	Loss	27–3	Juan Manuel Márquez	TKO	9 (12), 2:14	27 Nov 2010	MGM Grand Garden Arena, Paradise, Nevada, US	For WBA (Super), WBO, and The Ring lightweight titles
29	Win	27–2	Kevin Mitchell	TKO	3 (12), 1:57	15 May 2010	Boleyn Ground, London, England	Retained WBO interim lightweight title
28	Win	26–2	Vicente Escobedo	SD	12	19 Sep 2009	MGM Grand Garden Arena, Paradise, Nevada, US	Won vacant WBO interim lightweight title
27	Win	25–2	Jesús Chávez	RTD	8 (10), 0:10	4 Apr 2009	Frank Erwin Center, Austin, Texas, US	
26	Win	24–2	Angel Hugo Ramirez	UD	10	31 Jan 2009	Coliseum, Cebu City, Philippines	Won vacant WBO Asia Pacific lightweight title
25	Loss	23–2	Juan Díaz	SD	12	6 Sep 2008	Toyota Center, Houston, Texas, US	For vacant IBO lightweight title
24	Loss	23–1	Joel Casamayor	TKO	10 (12), 0:30	22 Mar 2008	Morongo Casino Resort & Spa, Cabazon, California, US	Lost WBO interim lightweight title; For The Ring lightweight title
23	Win	23–0	Czar Amonsot	UD	12	21 Jul 2007	Mandalay Bay Events Center, Paradise, Nevada, US	Retained WBO interim lightweight title
22	Win	22–0	Graham Earl	RTD	5 (12), 3:00	17 Feb 2007	Wembley Arena, London, England	Won vacant WBO interim lightweight title
21	Win	21–0	Jakkirt Suwunnalirt	KO	2 (8), 2:26	2 Jun 2006	Convention & Exhibition Centre, Brisbane, Australia	
20	Win	20–0	Nonoy Gonzales	TKO	5 (10), 2:01	3 Mar 2006	Royal Pines Resort, Gold Coast, Australia	
19	Win	19–0	Guillermo Mosquera	TKO	1 (8), 2:38	11 Feb 2006	Rumours International, Toowoomba, Australia	
18	Win	18–0	Ranee Ganoy	TKO	5 (12), 2:03	19 Aug 2005	Convention & Exhibition Centre, Brisbane, Australia	Retained WBO Asia Pacific lightweight title
17	Win	17–0	Addisu Tebebu	TKO	2 (8), 1:51	8 Jun 2005	Entertainment Centre, Sydney, Australia	
16	Win	16–0	Pratet Sor Thanikul	KO	2 (10), 1:46	20 May 2005	Panthers World of Entertainment, Penrith, Australia	
15	Win	15–0	Eduardo Enrique Alvarez	KO	1 (12), 1:37	23 Feb 2005	Vodafone Arena, Melbourne, Australia	Retained WBO Asia Pacific lightweight title
14	Win	14–0	Sergio Rafael Liendo	RTD	8 (12), 3:00	6 Nov 2004	University of Southern Queensland, Toowoomba, Australia	Won vacant IBF Pan Pacific lightweight title
13	Win	13–0	Ivan Orlando Bustos	TKO	4 (8), 0:46	24 Sep 2004	Panthers World of Entertainment, Penrith, Australia	
12	Win	12–0	Singsiam Eausampan	KO	1 (12), 2:20	16 Jul 2004	Panthers World of Entertainment, Penrith, Australia	Won vacant WBO Asia Pacific lightweight title
11	Win	11–0	Singsamut Eausampan	KO	2 (8), 0:50	5 May 2004	Entertainment Centre, Sydney, Australia	
10	Win	10–0	Kongthawat Sor Kitti	TKO	9 (12)	8 Apr 2004	Cathedral Centre, Toowoomba, Australia	Won vacant WBO Asia Pacific lightweight title
9	Win	9–0	Fred Kinuthia	UD	10	20 Feb 2004	Broncos Leagues Club, Brisbane, Australia	Won vacant Australian light-welterweight title
8	Win	8–0	Fred Kinuthia	TKO	5 (8)	5 Dec 2003	Panthers World of Entertainment, Penrith, Australia	
7	Win	7–0	Daniel Hoskins	TKO	1 (6)	19 Sep 2003	Seagulls, Tweed Heads, Australia	
6	Win	6–0	Mohammed Jamal Khan	KO	1 (6)	22 Aug 2003	RSL Club, Gold Coast, Australia	
5	Win	5–0	Kevin O'Neill	TKO	4 (8)	28 Sep 2002	Saint Patricks Centre, Toowoomba, Australia	
4	Win	4–0	Jay Washington	TKO	1 (6), 1:03	19 Jul 2002	RSL Club, Gold Coast, Australia	
3	Win	3–0	Johnny Sheferaw	TKO	7 (8)	3 Jun 2002	E.G. Whitlam Recreation Centre, Sydney, Australia	
2	Win	2–0	James Swan	UD	12	9 Mar 2002	Toowoomba Cathedral, Toowoomba, Australia	Won Australian lightweight title
1	Win	1–0	Danny Wilson	KO	3	1 Dec 2001	Saint Patricks Centre, Toowoomba, Australia	Won Queensland lightweight title

Sporting positions
Regional boxing titles
Preceded by Danny Wilson	Queensland lightweight champion 1 December 2001 – 3 April 2003; Vacated	Vacant Title next held by Danny Wilson
Preceded by James Swan	Australian lightweight champion 9 March 2002 – 14 June 2002; Vacated	Vacant Title next held by Naoufel Ben Rabah
Vacant Title last held by Fred Kinuthia	Australian light-welterweight champion 20 February 2004 – 18 March 2005; Vacated	Vacant Title next held by Mick Shaw
New title	WBO Asia Pacific lightweight champion 8 April 2004 – 9 February 2007; Vacated	Vacant Title next held by Czar Amonsot
Vacant Title last held by Joey De Ricardo	IBF Pan Pacific lightweight champion 6 November 2004 – 9 March 2007; Vacated	Vacant Title next held by Ranee Ganoy
Vacant Title last held by Bobby Pacquiao	WBO Asia Pacific lightweight champion 31 January 2009 – 2 July 2009; Vacated	Vacant Title next held by Dmitry Ganiev
World boxing titles
New title	WBO lightweight champion Interim title 17 February 2007 – 22 March 2008	Succeeded by Joel Casamayor
Vacant Title last held by Joel Casamayor	WBO lightweight champion Interim title 19 September 2009 – 27 November 2010; Lost bid for full title	Vacant Title next held by Robert Guerrero
Awards
Inaugural award	HBO Fight of the Year vs. Juan Manuel Márquez; 2010	Next: Andre Berto vs. Victor Ortiz
