= Czar Amonsot =

Filipino boxer (born 1985)

Personal information
- Nickname: Czar Of Bohol
- Nationality: Filipinon/Australian
- Born: Augusto Caesar Amonsot; August 30, 1985 (age 41) Tagbilaran, Bohol, Philippines
- Height: 5 ft 7.5 in (1.71 m)
- Weight: Light welterweight Lightweight; Super Featherweight; Featherweight

Boxing career
- Reach: 67.5 in (172 cm)
- Stance: Southpaw

Boxing record
- Total fights: 40
- Wins: 34
- Win by KO: 22
- Losses: 3
- Draws: 3

Augusto Caesar Amonsot (born August 30, 1985), more commonly known as Czar Amonsot, is a Filipino professional boxer. He challenged once for the WBO interim world title in 2007.

== Boxing career ==
=== Early career ===
On January 18, 2004, at the Gaisano Country Mall in Cebu City, Philippines, Amonsot made his professional debut. He won by technical knockout against Rey Lomoljo in the fifth round of their scheduled six-round fight.

On May 29, 2004, after accumulating an undefeated record of 5 wins, 5 KOs, Amonsot made his international debut when he fought in unfamiliar territory in Uijeongbu, South Korea against Kim-Jung Park. Impressively, Amonsot knocked out the latter in the second round of their scheduled eight-round fight.

After going back to the Philippines after his win against Park, Amonsot gained two more wins in his record. The first being against Nolasco Dan, the first opponent of Amonsot to survive the distance, and the other being the then Indonesian Featherweight Champion Leed Shabu, whom Amonsot stopped in the sixth round.

Amonsot's next four fights were held in foreign territory, in the RCTI Studio in Jakarta, Indonesia. His first fight in the country was rather disappointing, with Amonsot suffering his first loss as a pro, losing by TKO to Simson Butar-Butar during the fifth round. His next fight wasn't a win either, but a draw against Joey De Ricardo after ten rounds. Finally, in the third fight of his four-fight campaign in Indonesia, Amonsot finally got back to his winning ways, registering a TKO win against Syamsul Hidayat in the fourth round. And in a rematch, Amonsot, in his final fight in Indonesia, defeated Leed Shabu once again, this time winning by a unanimous decision after ten rounds.

After registering two wins, a draw, and his first loss as a pro in Indonesia, Amonsot came back to the Philippines to defeat Jun Paderna and Richard Cabillo. He later went on to defeat the then undefeated WBO Asia Pacific Super Featherweight Champion Victor Mausul of Indonesia to earn his first regional belt.

On February 3, 2006, in The Orleans Hotel and Casino in Las Vegas, Nevada, Amonsot made his U.S. debut against Cristian Favela of Mexico. After eight rounds of action, Amonsot was awarded the victory, winning the bout by unanimous decision.

Amonsot won his next three fights after the win over Favela, beating the likes of Decho Kokietgym, Jose Reyes, and Silverio Ortiz, accumulating a record of 17-1-1 with 10 victories coming by way of knockout.

=== Rematch with Butar-Butar ===
On September 23, 2006, Amonsot fought the same Simson Butar-Butar who gave him his first loss just about a year and a half ago, but this time, Amonsot had the home court advantage, the fight being held in his hometown of Tagbilaran City, Bohol. The fight was to be fought for Amonsot's WBO Asia Pacific Super Featherweight belt, but due to Amonsot's failure to make weight during the weigh-in, weighing-in at a notorious five pounds over the limit, only Butar-Butar had the privilege to fight for the title.

Amonsot, to the dismay of the crowd, was embarrassed in front of his hometown fans, losing in just 47-seconds into the first round of the bout. Amonsot was caught flush by a right hook from Butar-Butar, sending him down. He tried to get up, but was counted out after he went down again, obviously disorientated from the punch that caught him right on the chin.

=== Fight with Michael Katsidis ===
The fight that most fans know Amonsot for was his bloody war with Michael Katsidis. On July 21, 2007, Amonsot faced Katsidis for the interim WBO lightweight title at the Mandalay Bay Resort in Las Vegas, Nevada. Amonsot lost a 12-round unanimous decision in a violent, back and forth struggle with the Australian Katsidis. He suffered a brain bleed in that fight which many observers assumed would mark the end of his professional career. As of 2017, however, he continues to fight.

== Professional Boxing Record ==
34 Wins (22 knockouts, 11 decisions), 3 Defeat (2 knockouts, 1 decision), 3 Draw, 0 No Contests
Res.	Record	Opponent	Type	Rd., Time	Date	Location	Notes
Win	34-3-3	(Hungary) Zsigmond Vass	KO	1(10)	2017-04-19	(Australia) The Melbourne Pavilion, Flemington, Victoria	Defends interim WBA Oceania super lightweight title
Win	33-3-3	(Thailand) Yutthapol Sudnongbua	TKO	7(10)	2016-11-25	(Australia) The Melbourne Pavilion, Flemington, Victoria	Defends interim WBA Oceania super lightweight title
Win	32-3-3	(Argentina) Christian Ariel Lopez	TKO	3(10)	2016-08-03	Hisense Arena, Melbourne, Victoria, Australia	Won interim WBA Oceania super lightweight title
Win	31-3-3	(Indonesia) Geisler AP	TKO	2(10)	2016-03-18	(Australia) The Melbourne Pavilion, Flemington, Victoria	Defends PABA Super Lightweight title and Defends WBA Pan African Super Lightweight title
Win	30-3-3	(Thailand) Wiraphot Phaennarong	TKO	1(6)	2015-11-11	(Australia) Convention & Exhibition Centre, Melbourne, Victoria	
Win	29-3-3	(Indonesia) Rusmin Kie Raha	TD	4(10)	2015-08-07	(Australia) The Melbourne Pavilion, Flemington, Victoria	Defends PABA Super Lightweight title and Won vacant WBA Pan African Super Lightweight title
Win	28-3-3	(Thailand) Padjai Yongyuthgym	UD	6(6)	2015-03-20	(Australia) The Melbourne Pavilion, Flemington, Victoria	
Win	27-3-3	(Thailand) Thong Por Chokchai	TKO	4(12)	2014-06-25	(Australia) The Melbourne Pavilion, Flemington, Victoria	Retained PABA super lightweight title.
Win	26-3-3	(Thailand) Sapapetch Sor Sakaorat	TKO	10(12), 0:44	2013-11-30	(Australia) The Melbourne Pavilion, Flemington, Victoria	
Win	25-3-3	(Indonesia) Stevi Ongen Ferdinandus	KO	10(12), 0:44	2013-10-17	(Australia) The Melbourne Pavilion, Flemington, Victoria	
Win	24-3-3	(Australia) Steven Wills	KO	3(12), 0:23	2013-09-12	(Australia) The Melbourne Pavilion, Flemington, Victoria	Won vacant PABA super lightweight title.
Win	23-3-3	(Ethiopia) Addisu Tebebu	RTD	6(10), 3:00	013-02-21	(Australia) The Melbourne Pavilion, Flemington, Victoria	Won Australian super lightweight title.
Draw	22-3-3	(Thailand) Singdet Nonpitayakom	TD	2(6), 1:22	2012-03-03	(Australia) Rumours International, Toowoomba, Queensland	
Draw	22-3-2	(Australia) Solomon Egberime	SD	12	2011-11-18	(Australia) The Melbourne Pavilion, Flemington, Victoria	For WBO Oriental super lightweight title.
Win	22-3-1	(Thailand) Sirichai Ekchumpol	KO	2(12), 0:32	2010-09-23	(Australia) Racecourse Atrium Room, Flemington, Victoria	Won vacant WBO Asia Pacific lightweight title.
Win	21-3-1	(Democratic Republic of the Congo) Jesus Kibunde Kakonge	UD	10	2009-10-16	(Philippines) Cebu City Waterfront Hotel & Casino, Lahug, Cebu City, Cebu	
Win	20-3-1	(Kenya) Morris Chule	UD	10	2009-05-16	(Philippines) Cebu City Coliseum, Cebu City, Cebu	
Win	19-3-1	(Indonesia) Zoel Fidal	KO	5(8), 1:39	2009-01-31	(Philippines) Island City Mall Car Park, Tagbilaran City, Bohol	
Loss	18-3-1	(Australia) Michael Katsidis	UD	12	2007-07-21	(United States) Mandalay Bay Resort & Casino, Las Vegas, Nevada	For interim WBO lightweight title.
Win	18-2-1	(South Korea) Da-Woon Jung	SD	12	2007-02-09	(South Korea) Lotte Hotels & Resorts, Euljiro, Jung-gu, Seoul	Won vacant WBO Asia Pacific lightweight title.
Loss	17-2-1	(Indonesia) Simson Butar Butar	KO	1(12), 0:47	2006-09-23	(Philippines) Island City Mall Car Park, Tagbilaran City, Bohol	For vacant WBO Asia Pacific super featherweight title.
Win	17-1-1	(Mexico) Silverio Ortiz	UD	10	2006-07-02	(Philippines) Araneta Coliseum, Cubao, Quezon City, Metro Manila	
Win	16-1-1	(Puerto Rico) Jose Reyes	UD	10	2006-05-12	(United States) Orleans Hotel & Casino, W. Tropicana, Las Vegas, Nevada	
Win	15-1-1	(Thailand) Decho Kokietgym	UD	10	2006-03-18	(Philippines) Mandaue City Sports and Cultural Complex, Centro, Mandaue City, Cebu	
Win	14-1-1	(Mexico) Cristian Favela	UD	8	2006-02-03	(United States) Orleans Hotel & Casino, W. Tropicana, Las Vegas, Nevada	
Win	13-1-1	(Indonesia) Victor Mausul	KO	8(12), 1:17	2005-11-19	(Philippines) Carlos P. Garcia Sports Complex, Tagbilaran City, Bohol	Won WBO Asia Pacific super featherweight title.
Win	12-1-1	(Philippines) Richard Cabillo	KO	1(10)	2005-07-20	(Philippines) Bohol Tourist Port, Tagbilaran City, Bohol	
Win	11-1-1	(Philippines) Jun Paderna	MD	10	2005-06-11	(Philippines) Mandaue City Sports and Cultural Complex, Centro, Mandaue City, Cebu	
Win	10-1-1	(Indonesia) Leed Shabu	UD	10	2005-05-14	(Indonesia) RCTI Studio, Jl Raya Pejuangan, Kebon Jeruk, West Jakarta	
Win	9-1-1	(Indonesia) Syamsul Hidayat	TKO	4(10)	005-04-12	(Indonesia) RCTI Studio, Jl Raya Pejuangan, Kebon Jeruk, West Jakarta	
Draw	8-1-1	(Indonesia) Joey De Ricardo	PTS	10	2005-03-22	(Indonesia) RCTI Studio, Jl Raya Pejuangan, Kebon Jeruk, West Jakarta	
Loss	8-1-0	(Indonesia) Simson Butar Butar	TKO	5(10)	2005-02-15	(Indonesia) RCTI Studio, Jl Raya Pejuangan, Kebon Jeruk, West Jakarta	
Win	8-0-0	(Indonesia) Leed Shabu	TKO	6(10)	2004-10-24	(Philippines) Bohol Wisdom School Gym, Tagbilaran City, Bohol	
Win	7-0-0	(Philippines) Arnel Porras	UD	10	2004-08-17	(Philippines) Mandaue City Sports and Cultural Complex, Centro, Mandaue City, Cebu	Won PBF featherweight title.
Win	6-0-0	(South Korea) Dae-Kyung Park	KO	2(8), 0:36	2004-05-29	(South Korea) Kyongmin University Gym, Uijeongbu City, Gyeonggi	
Win	5-0-0	(Philippines) Junie Gaabon	TKO	2(8)	2004-05-05	(Philippines) Mandaue City Hall Plaza, Centro, Mandaue City, Cebu	
Win	4-0-0	(Philippines) Ronald Postrano	KO	2(8)	2004-04-04	(Philippines) Mandaue City Sports and Cultural Complex, Centro, Mandaue City, Cebu	
Win	3-0-0	(Philippines) Ferdinand Sagado	TKO	3(6), 1:52	2004-03-25	(Philippines) Joe Cantada Sports Center, Taguig, Metro Manila	
Win	2-0-0	(Philippines) Danilo Logramonte	TKO	1(6)	2004-02-28	(Philippines) Mandaue City Sports and Cultural Complex, Centro, Mandaue City, Cebu	
Win	1-0-0	(Philippines) Rey Lomoljo	TKO	5(6)	2004-01-18	(Philippines) Gaisano Country Mall Parking Lot, Banilad, Cebu City, Cebu	Professional debut.
