= Floyd Mayweather Jr. vs. Juan Manuel Márquez =

2009 professional boxing match

Number One
- Date: September 19, 2009
- Venue: MGM Grand Garden Arena, Las Vegas, Nevada, U.S.

Tale of the tape
Boxer	Floyd Mayweather Jr.	Juan Manuel Márquez
Nickname	"Money"	"Dinamita" (“Dynamite”)
Hometown	Grand Rapids, Michigan, U.S.	Iztacalco, Mexico City, Mexico
Purse	$10,000,000	$3,200,000
Pre-fight record	39–0 (25 KO)	50–4–1 (37 KO)
Age	32 years, 6 months	36 years
Height	5 ft 8 in (173 cm)	5 ft 7 in (170 cm)
Weight	146 lb (66 kg)	142 lb (64 kg)
Style	Orthodox	Orthodox
Recognition	5-division world champion	WBA (Super), WBO, The Ring; Lightweight Champion; The Ring No. 2 ranked pound-for-pound fighter 3-division world champion

Result
- Mayweather Jr. wins via 12-round unanimous decision (120–107, 119–108, 118–109)

Floyd Mayweather Jr. vs. Juan Manuel Márquez, billed as Number One/Número Uno, was a welterweight professional boxing match which took place on September 19, 2009, at the MGM Grand Arena in Las Vegas between five-division world champion Floyd Mayweather Jr. (39–0, 25 KO) and three-division champion Juan Manuel Márquez (50–4–1, 37 KO). The fight served as a return to the ring for Mayweather, who, after his knock out victory of Ricky Hatton in December 2007, initially announced he would take a two-year layoff from boxing, later announcing that he was retiring.

Mayweather successfully returned, winning a unanimous decision.

== Background ==
The fight took place at the MGM Grand in Las Vegas, Nevada under the promotion of Golden Boy Promotions and Mayweather Promotions. It was contested at catchweight of 144 pounds, with no titles being on the line.

The fight was televised on HBO Pay-Per-View, with the cost to watch the fight at $49.95 in the US. It was also shown in movie theaters across the country via NCM Fathom.

This fight sold more than 1,000,000 PPV buys generating over $52 million in sales.

Juan Manuel Márquez made a guaranteed $3.2 million, as well as an additional $600,000 due to Floyd Mayweather Jr. coming in two pounds over the 144 lbs weight limit. Floyd Mayweather earned $10 million.

=== Hype ===
As part of the buildup for the fight, HBO produced an unprecedented four-part prelude. The series, titled Mayweather-Marquez 24/7, aired installments on the final three Sundays of September, with the fourth installment airing on Friday, September 18, one day before the fight. The series focused on each fighter's training and preparation for the bout. Promoted as the return of Floyd Mayweather, promoters labeled it Number One/Numero Uno due to Mayweather's previous position as pound-for-pound boxing champion and Marquez's position as Mexico's number one fighter.

== The fight ==
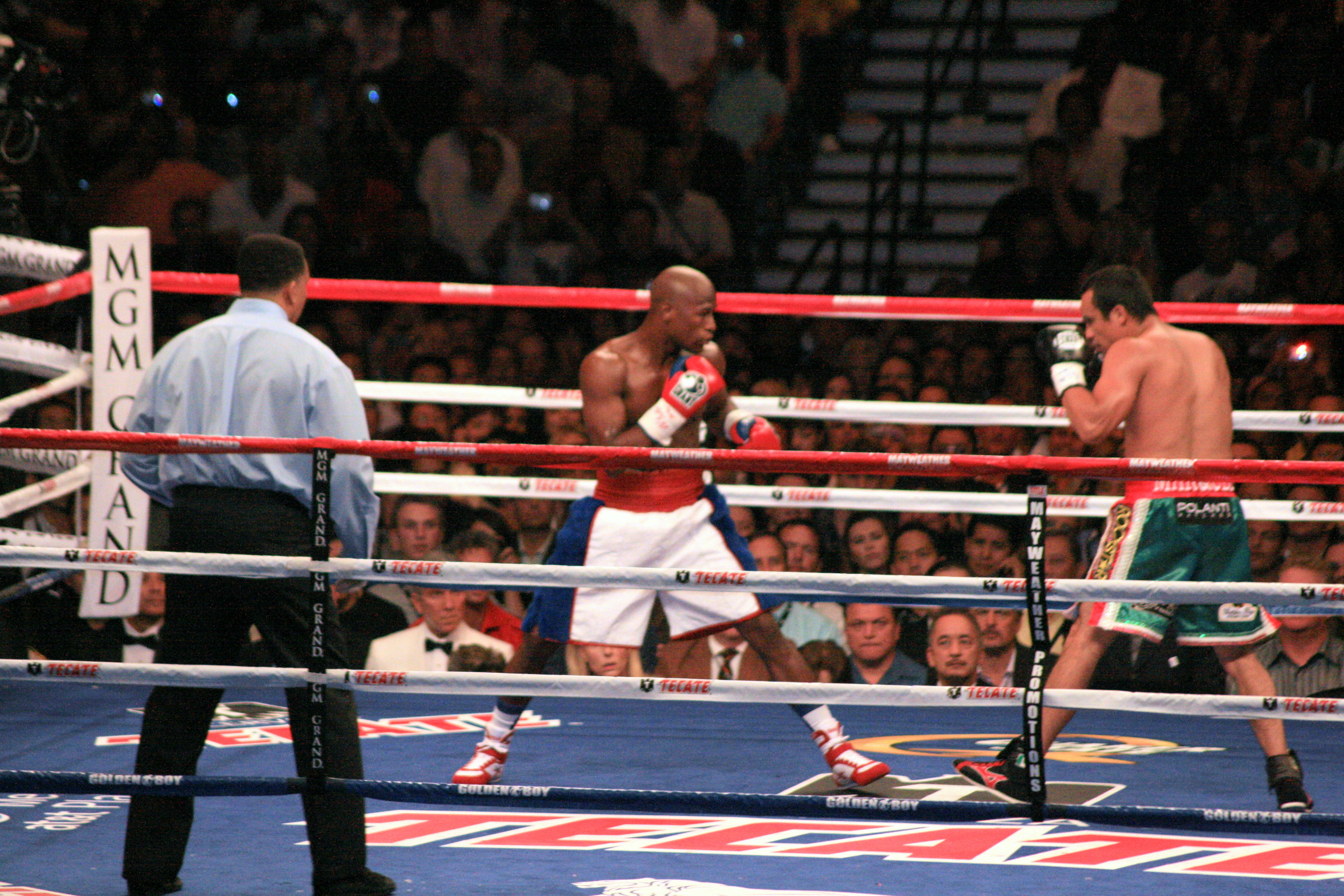
During the bout between Mayweather and Marquez

The opening round was largely a feeling-out round as Mayweather worked with a quick jab and a lunging left hand. Marquez threw the occasional hook but was unable to connect against the speedy Mayweather. A minute into Round 2, Marquez landed a right hand that got the attention of Mayweather. A Mayweather left hook, however, caught Marquez coming in and put him down midway through the round. He was up quickly and received a mandatory eight-count. Mayweather continued to outbox Marquez in the third, finding success with the lunging left hook. Mayweather continued to show impeccable defensive skills in Round 4 making Marquez miss with most of his shots. Marquez did land another right hand in the final minute, however, that brought a smile to the face of Mayweather. By the end of Round 4, Mayweather had opened a small cut above the right eye of Marquez. Round 5 saw Mayweather continue to be too fast for Marquez. He began landing more frequently with both left and right hands. Marquez did seem to have a greater sense of urgency in Round 5 as he was clearly trailing on the cards. The disparity between the two fighters grew in the 6th as Mayweather began landing a lead right hand that at one point wobbled Marquez, who had begun bleeding from the nose. Marquez was simply unable to land against the supremely quick Mayweather, who either dodged the attack outright or shoulder rolled it with ease. Round 7 saw Mayweather continuing to land with the jab and looking to land uppercuts as Marquez came in. Marquez at one point had Mayweather backed into the ropes but could not connect against Mayweather's movement. In the last minute of Round 8, Mayweather backed against the ropes and encouraged Marquez to attack, at which Marquez came in wildly throwing hooks to the body. As the bell rang, Mayweather smiled walking to his corner attempting to further aggravate Marquez. Marquez opening the 9th Round strong and was able to land against Mayweather intermittently. A big left hand, however, caught Marquez flush toward the end of the round. The 10th Round continued with much of the same; Mayweather landing the occasional lunging left hand and lead right and Marquez showing desire but not connecting with anything of significance. In the 11th Round, Marquez continued to show effort but still took big punches. The final round went like the many previous with Mayweather totally in control.

At the end of 12 rounds Mayweather won a unanimous decision victory with scores of 120–107, 118–109 and 119–108.

== Reception ==
The Bout generated 1 million pay-per-view buys, and is just the sixth highest ranking non-heavyweight event to generate 1 million buys on a list headed by Mayweather's split-decision victory over Oscar De La Hoya in 2007, which had a record 2.44 million. This was later beaten by the reported 1.25 million Pacquiao-Cotto fight.

== Aftermath ==
=== Controversy ===
Because Marquez had never before fought above 135 lbs and had fought at 130 lbs as recently as March 2008, while Mayweather had campaigned at 147 lbs since 2005, the fight was scheduled to take place at a catchweight of 144 lbs to account for the size disparity between the two fighters. The fight was originally scheduled for July 18, 2009 at the MGM Grand arena but was postponed due to a rib injury sustained by Mayweather. The bout was rescheduled for September 19, 2009. During the official weigh in for their 144 lb bout, Marquez weighed in at 142 lbs and Mayweather weighed in at 146 lbs thereby incurring a financial penalty ($300,000 for each pound over 144 lbs) as he was 2 pounds over the catchweight. It was later revealed that the contract was changed a few days prior to the weigh in so that Mayweather would be allowed to weigh up to the welterweight limit of 147 lbs while avoiding paying an additional fine to the Nevada State Athletic Commission, in addition to the fine he agreed to pay to Marquez.

== Fight Card ==
Confirmed bouts:

=== Televised ===
- Welterweight bout: (United States) Floyd Mayweather Jr. vs. (Mexico) Juan Manuel Márquez

Mayweather defeats Marquez via Unanimous Decision. (120-107, 119-108, 118-109)

- Featherweight Championship bout: (Indonesia) Chris John vs. (United States) Rocky Juarez

John defeats Juarez via Unanimous Decision. (119-109, 117-111, 114-113)

- Lightweight bout: (Australia) Michael Katsidis vs. (United States) Vicente Escobedo

Katsidis defeats Escobedo via Split Decision. (118-110, 115-113, 112-116)

=== Preliminary card ===
- Featherweight bout: (United States) Cornelius Lock vs. (Puerto Rico) Orlando Cruz

Lock defeats Cruz via Technical Knockout at 2:08 of the fifth round.

- Welterweight bout: (Morocco) Said Ouali vs. (Mexico) Francisco Rios Gil

Ouali defeats Rios Gil via Technical Knockout at 1:27 of the second round.

- Middleweight bout: (United States) Erislandy Lara vs. (Nicaragua) Jose Varela

Lara defeats Varela via Knockout at 2:12 of the first round.

- Light Welterweight bout: (United States) Jessie Vargas vs. (United States) Raul Tovar

Vargas defeats Tovar via Unanimous Decision. (60-52, 60-52, 59-53)

- Super Middleweight: (United States) Dion Savage vs. (United States) Loren Myers

Savage defeats Myers via Technical Knockout at 0:22 of the fourth round.

- Lightweight bout: (United States) Michael Perez vs. (United States) Richard Ellis

Perez defeats Ellis via Unanimous Decision. (40-34, 39-35, 38-36)

== International broadcasting ==
The exclusive coverage in the Mayweather-Marquez fight at the following international broadcasters:

Country	Broadcaster
Albania	SuperSport 1
Argentina	TyC Sports
Australia	Main Event
Brazil	SporTV
Chile	ESPN+
Czech Republic	Sport 1
Denmark	TV2 Sport
Fiji	Sky Pacific
France	Canal+
Germany	Sky Sport 1
Greece	Nova Sports 4
Hungary	Sport 2
Italy	Sky Calcio 12
Malaysia	Astro SuperSport 2
Mexico	Canal 5
New Zealand	SKY Box Office 200
Philippines	ABS-CBN (live via satellite); Studio 23 (primetime telecast)
Poland	Polsat Sport Extra
Portugal	SPORT TV2
Qatar	Al Jazeera Sports 1
Romania	Sport.ro
Russia	NTV Plus Sport
Slovakia	Sport 1
South Africa	SuperSport 2
Spain	Taquilla 3
Ukraine	Sport 1
United Kingdom	Sky Sports 1
United States	HBO PPV
United States	Movie Theaters via NCM Fathom
United States	US Military via AFN Sports
Venezuela	Meridiano

Preceded by vs. Juan Díaz	Juan Manuel Márquez's bouts 19 September 2009	Succeeded by vs. Juan Díaz II
Preceded by vs. Ricky Hatton	Floyd Mayweather Jr.'s bouts 19 September 2009	Succeeded by vs. Shane Mosley
