= Vicente Escobedo =

American boxer (born 1981)

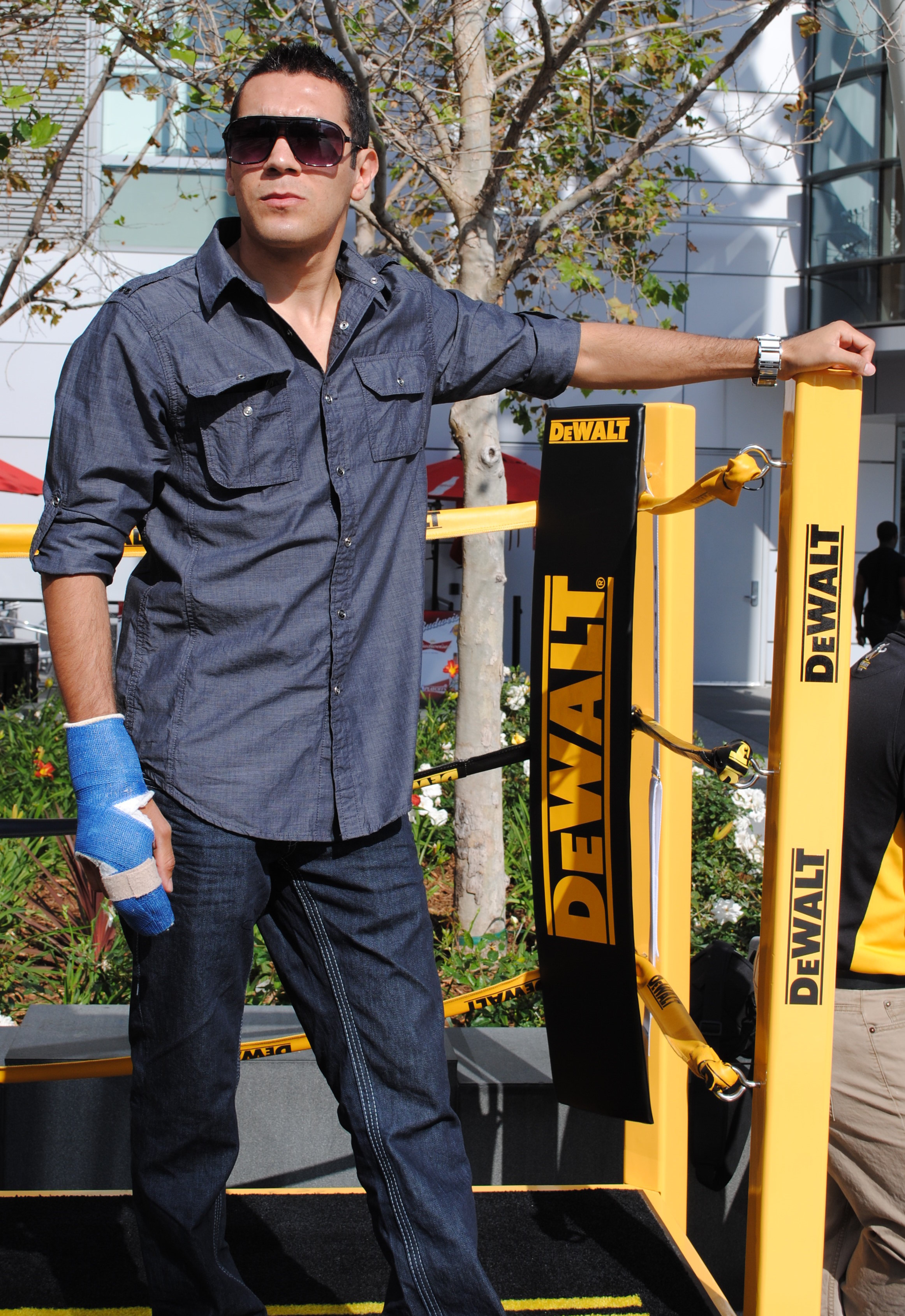
- Escobedo in 2011

Personal information
- Nickname: Chente
- Born: Vicente Escobedo; November 6, 1981 (age 44) Woodland, California, United States
- Height: 5 ft 8 in (1.73 m)
- Weight: Lightweight

Boxing career
- Reach: 74 in (188 cm)
- Stance: Orthodox

Boxing record
- Total fights: 32
- Wins: 26
- Win by KO: 14
- Losses: 6

Vicente Escobedo (born November 6, 1981) is an American former professional boxer who competed from 2005 to 2013. As an amateur, he represented his country at the 2003 World Championships and the 2004 Summer Olympics.

== Biography ==
Escobedo grew up in a Mexican-American family in Woodland, California. As an amateur, Escobedo boxed out of the Woodland Boxing Club.

Escobedo represented the United States at the 2004 Summer Olympics, winning one bout and losing one bout. He qualified for the Olympic Games by ending up in first place at the 1st AIBA American 2004 Olympic Qualifying Tournament in Tijuana, Mexico.

=== Olympic Results ===
- Jose David Mosquera (Colombia) W TKO 3
- Rovshan Huseynov (Azerbaijan) L PTS (18-36)

=== Amateur Highlights ===
- Won a gold medal at the 1997 US Junior Olympics at 106 lbs.
- Won a bronze medal at 112 lbs at International Junior Olympics tournament in 1997.
- Bronze medalist at the 1998 US Junior championships at 119 lbs, losing to Mike Albares.
- Competed at the 2000 United States (US) championships at 125 lbs.
- 2000 P.A.L. National Champion - Won a gold medal at the 2000 Police Athletic League (PAL) Championships at 132 lbs, beating Paul Malignaggi and Marshall Christmas.
- Competed at the 2001 US championships at 132 lbs, losing Verquan Kimbrough.
- Won a silver medal at the 2001 PAL championships at 132 lbs, losing to Marshall Christmas.
- Won a bronze medal at the 2002 US championships at 132 lbs, losing to Lorenzo Reynolds.
- 2002 P.A.L. National Champion - Won a gold medal at the 2002 PAL championships at 132 lbs, beating Marlon Kerwick, David Rodela and Allen Litzau.
- 2003 United States Amateur Champion - 132 lbs. - Won a gold medal at the 2003 US championships at 132 lbs beating Aaron Bensinger of the Army World Class Athlete Program a three time National Championship bronze medalist 2002 P.A.L, 2003 National Golden Gloves, and 2004 Western Trials, Karl Dargan and Wes Ferguson.
- Competed at the 2003 PAL championships at 132 lbs, losing to Tyrone Harris.
- Competed at the 2003 World championships at 132 lbs.
- Won a silver medal at the 2004 US championships at 132 lbs, beating Hector Ramos and Mike Torres but losing to Anthony Vasquez.
- Won 2004 US Western Olympic trials at 132 lbs beating Sadot Vazquez.
- Won 2004 US Olympic trials at 132 lbs beating Miguel Gonzalez, Anthony Peterson, Anthony Vasquez and Peterson again.
- Won 2004 US Olympic box-off at 132 lbs, beating Anthony Peterson.
- Won a gold medal at the 2004 Titan Games at 60 kg.

== Professional career ==
Escobedo started off his career with nine straight wins, followed by a loss to Daniel Jiménez. He fought eleven more fights, winning all of them, including wins against former champions Carlos Hernandez and Kevin Kelly. On September 19, 2009, he fought Michael Katsidis for the interim WBO lightweight title, but lost the bout by split decision. On November 6, 2010, he was defeated by Robert Guerrero via unanimous decision, Escobedo was knocked down twice by Guerrero. In 2012 he lost another title fight by TKO in the 5th round to Adrien Broner. On February 16, 2013, Escobedo was knocked out by Edner Cherry in the 6th round. (he was down once in the 2nd round and twice in the 6th). In September 2013 Escobedo suffered his third consecutive loss by KO to Fernando Carcamo, Escobedo was KO'd in round 2. Overall, he has compiled a record of 25 wins (14 by knockout), and 6 losses.

== Professional boxing record ==
32 fights	26 wins	6 losses
By knockout	15	3
By decision	11	3

No.	Result	Record	Opponent	Type	Round, time	Date	Location	Notes
32	Loss	26–6	Fernando Carcamo	TKO	2 (10), 0:26	21 Sep 2013	Oasis Hotel Complex, Cancún, Mexico	
31	Loss	26–5	Edner Cherry	TKO	6 (10), 3:00	16 Feb 2013	Boardwalk Hall, Atlantic City, New Jersey, U.S.	
30	Loss	26–4	Adrien Broner	TKO	5 (12), 2:45	21 Jul 2012	U.S. Bank Arena, Cincinnati, Ohio, U.S.	For vacant WBO super featherweight title
29	Win	26–3	Juan Ruiz	UD	10	12 May 2012	Community & Senior Center, Woodland, California, U.S.	
28	Win	25–3	Lonnie Smith	TKO	1 (10), 2:20	3 Mar 2012	Community & Senior Center, Woodland, California, U.S.	Won vacant WBO–NABO super featherweight title
27	Win	24–3	Rocky Juarez	UD	10	23 Sep 2011	Fantasy Springs Resort Casino, Indio, California, U.S.	
26	Win	23–3	Walter Estrada	UD	10	3 Mar 2011	Fantasy Springs Resort Casino, Indio, California, U.S.	
25	Loss	22–3	Robert Guerrero	UD	10	6 Nov 2010	Prudential Center, Newark, New Jersey, U.S.	For vacant WBO Inter-Continental lightweight title
24	Win	22–2	Carlos Urías	TKO	3 (10), 1:33	26 Mar 2010	Auditorio Plaza Condesa, Mexico City, Mexico	
23	Loss	21–2	Michael Katsidis	SD	12	19 Sep 2009	MGM Grand Garden Arena, Paradise, Nevada, U.S.	For vacant WBO interim lightweight title
22	Win	21–1	Kevin Kelley	TKO	2 (10), 1:53	21 May 2009	Arco Arena, Sacramento, California, U.S.	
21	Win	20–1	Carlos Hernández	UD	10	4 Apr 2009	Frank Erwin Center, Austin, Texas, U.S.	
20	Win	19–1	Dominic Salcido	TKO	6 (10), 0:42	26 Sep 2008	Morongo Casino Resort & Spa, Cabazon, California, U.S.	
19	Win	18–1	Cristian Favela	UD	8	18 Jun 2008	Arco Arena, Sacramento, California, U.S.	
18	Win	17–1	Roberto David Arrieta	UD	10	2 May 2008	The Home Depot Center, Carson, California, U.S.	
17	Win	16–1	Pascali Adorno	UD	10	11 Jan 2008	Morongo Casino Resort & Spa, Cabazon, California, U.S.	
16	Win	15–1	Miguel Angel Munguia	UD	8	6 Oct 2007	Mandalay Bay, Paradise, Nevada, U.S.	
15	Win	14–1	Carlos Diaz	UD	10	6 Jul 2007	Convention Center, McAllen, Texas, U.S.	
14	Win	13–1	Priest Smalls	UD	10	1 Feb 2007	Arco Arena, Sacramento, California, U.S.	
13	Win	12–1	Julian Rodriguez	KO	4 (8), 2:05	30 Nov 2006	Arco Arena, Sacramento, California, U.S.	
12	Win	11–1	Ramón Guevara	KO	5 (8), 2:33	10 Nov 2006	Cicero Stadium, Cicero, Illinois, U.S.	
11	Win	10–1	Baudel Cardenas	UD	8	20 Jul 2006	Arco Arena, Sacramento, California, U.S.	
10	Loss	9–1	Daniel Jiménez	SD	8	21 Apr 2006	Arco Arena, Sacramento, California, U.S.	
9	Win	9–0	Jesús Salvador Pérez	TKO	6 (8), 2:53	27 Jan 2006	Desert Diamond Casino, Tucson, Arizona, U.S.	
8	Win	8–0	Jefferson Auraad Rodríguez	KO	2 (8), 1:40	5 Jan 2006	Arco Arena, Sacramento, California, U.S.	
7	Win	7–0	Gregory Piper	KO	2 (6), 1:52	17 Sep 2005	MGM Grand Garden Arena, Paradise, Nevada, U.S.	
6	Win	6–0	Juan Manuel Matias	TKO	2 (6), 2:58	19 Aug 2005	Don Haskins Center, El Paso, Texas, U.S.	
5	Win	5–0	Edgar Fabian Vargas	TKO	1 (6), 2:57	16 Jul 2005	MGM Grand Garden Arena, Paradise, Nevada, U.S.	
4	Win	4–0	Oscar Villa	TKO	2 (6), 3:00	27 May 2005	Arco Arena, Sacramento, California, U.S.	
3	Win	3–0	Geronimo Hernandez	TKO	4 (6), 0:10	29 Apr 2005	Energy Arena, Laredo, Texas, U.S.	
2	Win	2–0	Jose Rodriguez	KO	1 (6), 1:22	9 Apr 2005	Don Haskins Center, El Paso, Texas, U.S.	
1	Win	1–0	Abraham Verdugo	KO	2 (6), 1:06	19 Feb 2005	Staples Center, Los Angeles, California, U.S.	

== Media ==
Escobedo made an appearance as himself in Fight Night Round 3. He was also featured in the 4th episode of Discovery Channel's Fight Quest, while training in Ignacio "Nacho" Beristáin's gym in Mexico City.

== Personal life ==
Escobedo currently works as a boxing coach at Classic Kickboxing in Downtown Pasadena.
