= Allen Litzau =

American boxer

Allen Curtis Litzau, alias The American Boy (born April 12, 1982) is a featherweight former professional boxer from Minnesota.

== Personal life ==
Allen Litzau is the older brother of featherweight prospect Jason Litzau. Both are from St Paul, Minnesota.

== Amateur career ==
- Won the MBF tournament in 1996.
- Took Bronze in PAL tournament in 1999.
- Took Bronze in Western Olympic trials in 1999.
- Took Bronze in Blue and Gold Tournament in 1999.
- Four times Upper Midwest Golden Gloves champion:
  - 112# division in 1999
  - 119# division in 2000
  - 125# division in 2001
  - 132# division in 2002

== Professional career ==
Allen Litzau won his professional debut in November 2002, but lost his next fight. On June 4, 2005, Litzau defeated 8-0 Darby Smart for the Minnesota State Featherweight Title. After putting together nine consecutive wins, Litzau lost again to Terry Lantz in May 2006. Litzau has fought in his native Minnesota, as well as in Nevada, New Jersey, and Texas. Allen Litzau, his brother Jason Litzau, and their friend Antonio Johnson are closely associated both professionally and personally, referring to themselves as the Three Musketeers.

Litzau defeated Mario Galan on June 6, 2008, to improve his professional record to 13-3. In what could have been a big break, Litzau was contracted to fight Australian prospect William Kickett on August 22, 2008, but the bout was called off.

In February 2009 it was announced that Litzau would meet 10-0 prospect Wilton Hilario for the IBA Americas featherweight title in a grudge match headlining the April 18 event at Target Center in Minneapolis. Litzau lost the fight by TKO when referee Mark Nelson stopped the fight in the fifth round.
