= Juan Díaz (boxer) =

American boxer (born 1983)

Personal information
- Nickname: Baby Bull
- Born: September 17, 1983 (age 42) Houston, Texas, U.S.
- Height: 5 ft 6 in (168 cm)
- Weight: Lightweight; Light welterweight

Boxing career
- Reach: 67 in (170 cm)
- Stance: Orthodox

Boxing record
- Total fights: 46
- Wins: 42
- Win by KO: 21
- Losses: 4

Juan Díaz (born September 17, 1983) is an American professional boxer who held the WBA (Unified), IBF and WBO lightweight championships from 2007 to 2008 and the IBO lightweight championship from 2008 to 2009.

== Amateur career ==
Diaz was 105–5 as an amateur, winning 13 National Gold Medals, two National Silver Medals and four World Championships. He thought he had qualified for the 2000 Mexican Olympic team but was informed he was too young to compete in Sydney. He did not want to wait four more years and turned pro.

== Professional career ==
=== Lightweight ===
Díaz made his professional boxing debut at age 16 on June 23, 2000 with a first-round TKO victory over Rafael Ortiz. He won his first five fights by knockout.

On November 22, 2003, Díaz won the WBO youth lightweight title with a sixth-round TKO of journeyman Joel Pérez. He accumulated a record of 24–0, which included wins over title challengers Joel Perez and Francisco Lorenzo, before challenging for his first world title.

On July 17, 2004, Díaz defeated Mongolian Lakva Sim for the WBA lightweight title by unanimous decision. Díaz defended the title seven times. On December 4, 2004, he defeated former two-time WBA lightweight champion Julien Lorcy by unanimous decision. In his second defense, he defeated Billy Irwin by 9th round tko. On April 8, 2006, he defended his title against undefeated José Miguel Cotto (brother of Miguel Cotto) with a unanimous decision victory. In his next fight, he defeated Randy Suico by 9th round tko. On November 14, 2006, Diaz successfully defended his title for the fifth time against Fernando Angulo of Ecuador by unanimous decision.

On April 28, 2007, Diaz was upgraded to super champion by the WBA, successfully defending his title against WBO champion Acelino Freitas by TKO after Freitas forfeited the fight before beginning the 9th round, unifying the WBO lightweight championship with the WBA (Super) lightweight title. The fight took place in Mashantucket, USA.

On October 13, 2007, Díaz unified a third title by defeating IBF Lightweight champion Julio Díaz in Chicago Illinois.

==== Diaz vs. Campbell ====
Nate Campbell defeated Diaz by split decision to become IBF, WBO, WBA Champion, on March 8, 2008 in Cancún, Mexico. This ended Diaz's undefeated streak of thirty-three wins.

Diaz's training is supervised by fitness guru Brian Caldwell of Houston Texas.

==== Diaz vs. Katsidis ====
Díaz (34–1, 17 KO's) won a 12-round split decision over Australia's previous WBO lightweight champion Michael Katsidis, (23–2, 20 KO's) on September 6, 2008. Diaz became the new IBO lightweight champion in the "No Retreat, No Surrender" main event fight at the Toyota Center in Houston, Texas. ringside judge Gale Van Hoy scored the fight 116–112 while Levi Martinez scored it 115–113, all for Diaz, but Judge Glen Hamada had it 115–113 for Katsidis.

==== Diaz vs. Marquez ====
On February 28, 2009, Juan Manuel Márquez defeated Diaz in the 9th round of a 12 round bout for the unified world lightweight title. In the opening rounds, Diaz appeared to be winning the fight, pinning Marquez on the ropes and occasionally staggering him with big left hands. In the eighth round, Diaz was cut over his eye by a Marquez punch, much like he was in the loss to Nate Campbell. After starting strong in the ninth round, Marquez's precision punching proved to be too much and Diaz was knocked down twice, bringing an end to the fight. This fight was named "Fight of the Year" for 2009 by Ring magazine and ESPN.com. A rematch was scheduled for July the 31st 2010. The fight was held live on Pay Per View and in U.S. Theaters around the country.

=== Brief foray at light welterweight ===
==== Diaz vs. Malignaggi I & II ====
On August 22, 2009, Diaz moved up in weight to challenge Paul Malignaggi for the vacant WBO NABO light welterweight title at a catch-weight of 138½ pounds in his hometown of Houston, Texas. Although the fight was competitive, Malignaggi appeared stronger in the latter rounds. Diaz was ultimately awarded a unanimous decision, however, the scores were controversial with one judge, Gale Von Hoy, scoring the fight 118–110 in Diaz's favor; another, Raul Caiz Sr., had it 115-113. Harold Lederman scored the fight 7 rounds to 5 for Malignaggi. On December 12, he had a rematch vs Paulie Malignaggi and lost a unanimous decision, all 3 judges scored it 116–111.

=== Return to lightweight ===
==== Diaz vs. Marquez II ====
Diaz fought Juan Manuel Márquez for the second time on July 31, 2010. Marquez won the fight via Unanimous Decision, 117–111, 118–110, 116–112

=== Comeback ===
==== Diaz vs. Pipino Cuevas Jr. ====
Declaring that he had "the fire back", the former unified lightweight titleholder Juan Díaz ended a 2½-year retirement on April 13 by fighting Gerardo "Pipino" Cuevas Jr. He was trained by Tim Knight of Louisville, Kentucky He won that bout, and went on fighting until 2016.

== Personal life ==
Díaz maintained a full-time academic schedule while boxing, graduating high school from Contemporary Learning Center in Houston in 2001 and obtaining a bachelor's degree in political science from the University of Houston–Downtown. He is a community activist who has been deputized as a Volunteer Voter Registrar for Harris County, Texas, and has also worked with the League of Women Voters of the Houston Area to promote full participation in civic life. Diaz's promotional company, Baby Bull LLC, partners with ESPN Deportes to produce the radio show The Baby Bull Show, which has featured guest appearances by fellow boxers. He also has a trucking company, JD Express Inc, with his brother Jose as partner.

== Professional boxing record ==
46 fights	42 wins	4 losses
By knockout	21	1
By decision	21	3

No.	Result	Record	Opponent	Type	Round, time	Date	Location	Notes
46	Win	42–4	Cesar Vasquez	TKO	8 (10), 2:09	Aug 6, 2016	Casino Del Sol, Tucson, Arizona, U.S.	
45	Win	41–4	Fernando Garcia	TKO	9 (10), 2:24	Mar 19, 2016	Arena Place, Houston, Texas, U.S.	
44	Win	40–4	Carlos Cardenas	UD	10	Sep 6, 2014	Energy Arena, Laredo, Texas, U.S.	
43	Win	39–4	Gerardo Robles	UD	10	Mar 1, 2014	Alamodome, San Antonio, Texas, U.S.	
42	Win	38–4	Juan Santiago	UD	10	Oct 19, 2013	1stBank Center, Denver, Colorado, U.S.	
41	Win	37–4	Adailton De Jesus	TKO	5 (10), 1:51	Aug 17, 2013	Energy Arena, Laredo, Texas, U.S.	
40	Win	36–4	Gerardo Cuevas	TKO	6 (10), 0:55	Apr 13, 2013	American Bank Center, Corpus Christi, Texas, U.S.	
39	Loss	35–4	Juan Manuel Márquez	UD	12	Jul 31, 2010	Mandalay Bay Events Center, Paradise, Nevada, U.S.	For WBA (Super), WBO, and The Ring lightweight titles
38	Loss	35–3	Paulie Malignaggi	UD	12	Dec 12, 2009	UIC Pavilion Chicago, Illinois, U.S.	Lost WBO–NABO junior welterweight title
37	Win	35–2	Paulie Malignaggi	UD	12	Aug 22, 2009	Toyota Center, Houston, Texas, U.S.	Won vacant WBO–NABO junior welterweight title
36	Loss	34–2	Juan Manuel Márquez	TKO	9 (12), 2:40	Feb 28, 2009	Toyota Center, Houston, Texas, U.S.	Lost IBO lightweight title; For The Ring, vacant WBA (Super), and WBO lightweight titles
35	Win	34–1	Michael Katsidis	SD	12	Sep 6, 2008	Toyota Center, Houston, Texas, U.S.	Won vacant IBO lightweight title
34	Loss	33–1	Nate Campbell	SD	12	Mar 8, 2008	Plaza de Toros, Cancún, Mexico	Lost WBA (Undisputed), IBF, and WBO lightweight titles
33	Win	33–0	Julio Díaz	TKO	9 (12), 0:01	Oct 13, 2007	Sears Centre Arena, Hoffman Estates, Illinois, U.S.	Retained WBA (Undisputed) and WBO lightweight titles; Won IBF lightweight title
32	Win	32–0	Acelino Freitas	RTD	8 (12), 3:00	Apr 28, 2007	Foxwoods Resort Casino, Ledyard, Connecticut, U.S.	Retained WBA (Unified) lightweight title; Won WBO lightweight title
31	Win	31–0	Fernando Angulo	UD	12	Nov 4, 2006	Chase Field, Phoenix, Arizona, U.S.	Retained WBA lightweight title
30	Win	30–0	Randy Suico	TKO	9 (12), 2:06	Jul 15, 2006	MGM Grand Garden Arena, Paradise, Nevada, U.S.	Retained WBA lightweight title
29	Win	29–0	José Cotto	UD	12	Apr 8, 2006	Thomas & Mack Center, Paradise, Nevada, U.S.	Retained WBA lightweight title
28	Win	28–0	Arthur Cruz	TKO	5 (10), 1:44	Jul 16, 2005	Coushatta Casino Resort, Kinder, Louisiana, U.S.	
27	Win	27–0	Billy Irwin	TKO	9 (12), 1:27	Jan 21, 2005	Reliant Center, Houston, Texas, U.S.	Retained WBA lightweight title
26	Win	26–0	Julien Lorcy	UD	12	Nov 4, 2004	AT&T Center, San Antonio, Texas, U.S.	Retained WBA lightweight title
25	Win	25–0	Lakva Sim	UD	12	Jul 17, 2004	Reliant Center, Houston, Texas, U.S.	Won WBA lightweight title
24	Win	24–0	Martin O'Malley	TKO	2 (10), 0:55	Apr 17, 2004	Pechanga Resort & Casino, Temecula, California, U.S.	
23	Win	23–0	Joel Perez	TKO	6 (10), 1:27	Nov 22, 2003	Reliant Center, Houston, Texas, U.S.	Retained WBC Youth lightweight title
22	Win	22–0	Francisco Lorenzo	UD	10	Jul 19, 2003	Reliant Center, Houston, Texas, U.S.	Retained WBC Youth lightweight title
21	Win	21–0	Eleazar Contreras Jr.	UD	10	May 10, 2003	Pechanga Resort & Casino, Temecula, California, U.S.	Won vacant WBC Youth lightweight title
20	Win	20–0	John Bailey	TKO	7 (10), 2:16	Feb 1, 2003	Mohegan Sun Arena, Montville, Connecticut, U.S.	
19	Win	19–0	Arthur Cruz	TKO	4 (10), 0:39	Nov 22, 2002	Bally's Park Place, Atlantic City, New Jersey, U.S.	
18	Win	18–0	Roy Delgado	TKO	6 (10), 0:46	Oct 19, 2002	Reliant Center, Houston, Texas, U.S.	
17	Win	17–0	Peter Nieves	UD	10	Aug 24, 2002	Bally's Park Place, Atlantic City, New Jersey, U.S.	
16	Win	16–0	Michael Davis	UD	10	Jul 5, 2002	Entertainment Center, Laredo, Texas, U.S.	
15	Win	15–0	Nelson Ramon Medina	UD	8	Apr 27, 2002	Mohegan Sun Arena, Montville, Connecticut, U.S.	
14	Win	14–0	Juan Carlos Juarez	UD	8	Feb 15, 2002	Radisson Hotel, Houston, Texas, U.S.	
13	Win	13–0	Rudolfo Lunsford	UD	4	Nov 10, 2001	Reliant Center, Houston, Texas, U.S.	
12	Win	12–0	Ubaldo Hernandez	SD	8	Sep 1, 2001	Don Haskins Center, El Paso, Texas, U.S.	
11	Win	11–0	Scott Buck	TKO	1 (6), 2:26	Jul 27, 2001	Soaring Eagle Casino & Resort, Mount Pleasant, Michigan, U.S.	
10	Win	10–0	John Trigg	UD	6	Jun 23, 2001	Mohegan Sun Arena, Montville, Connecticut, U.S.	
9	Win	9–0	Carlos Horacio Nevarez	KO	1 (6), 2:44	May 19, 2001	Mohegan Sun Arena, Montville, Connecticut, U.S.	
8	Win	8–0	Mahan Washington	UD	6	Mar 2, 2001	Texas Station, North Las Vegas, Nevada, U.S.	
7	Win	7–0	Bradley Jensen	UD	6	Jan 13, 2001	Mohegan Sun Arena, Montville, Connecticut, U.S.	
6	Win	6–0	Michael Lucero	UD	6	Dec 1, 2000	MGM Grand Garden Arena, Paradise, Nevada, U.S.	
5	Win	5–0	Antonio Young	TKO	2 (6), 1:43	Nov 10, 2000	Mandalay Bay Events Center, Paradise, Nevada, U.S.	
4	Win	4–0	Starr Johnson	TKO	3 (4)	Sep 22, 2000	International Ballroom, Houston, Texas, U.S.	
3	Win	3–0	Juan Carlos Alvarez	TKO	1 (4)	Sep 2, 2000	Salón Teotihuacán, Mexicali, Mexico	
2	Win	2–0	Miller Vazquez	KO	1 (4)	Jul 22, 2000	Arena México, Mexico City, Mexico	
1	Win	1–0	Rafael Ortiz	TKO	1 (4)	Jun 23, 2000	Poliforum Zamna, Mérida, Mexico	

== Titles in boxing ==
=== Major world titles ===
- WBA (Unified and Undisputed) lightweight champion (Note: Was the primary champion throughout his reign.) (135 lbs)
- IBF lightweight champion (135 lbs)
- WBO lightweight champion (135 lbs)

=== Minor world titles ===
- WBC Youth lightweight champion (135 lbs)
- IBO lightweight champion (135 lbs)

=== Regional/International titles ===
- NABO light welterweight champion (140 lbs)

=== Honorary titles ===
- WBO Super Champion

== Notes and references ==
=== References ===
Sporting positions
Regional boxing titles
Vacant Title last held by Yuri Ramanau	WBC Youth lightweight champion May 10, 2003 – April 2004; Vacated	Vacant Title next held by Alex Francisco Velardez
Vacant Title last held by Victor Ortiz	WBO–NABO junior welterweight champion August 22, 2009 – December 12, 2009	Succeeded by Paulie Malignaggi
Minor world boxing titles
Vacant Title last held by Isaac Hlatshwayo	IBO lightweight champion September 6, 2008 – February 28, 2009; Vacant after loss to Márquez	Vacant Title next held by Mlungisi Dlamini
Major world boxing titles
Preceded by Lakva Sim	WBA lightweight champion July 17, 2004 – March 8, 2008; Super title from February 23, 2007	Succeeded by Nate Campbell
Preceded by Acelino Freitas	WBO lightweight champion April 28, 2007 – March 8, 2008	Succeeded by Nate Campbell
Preceded by Julio Díaz	IBF lightweight champion October 13, 2007 – March 8, 2008	Succeeded by Nate Campbell
Awards
Previous: Israel Vázquez vs. Rafael Márquez III	The Ring Fight of the Year vs. Juan Manuel Márquez; 2009	Next: Giovani Segura vs. Iván Calderón
