= Juan Manuel Márquez vs. Juan Díaz II =

Boxing competition

The Rematch
- Date: July 31, 2010
- Venue: Mandalay Bay Resort & Casino, Paradise, Nevada, U.S.
- Title(s) on the line: WBA (Super), WBO, and The Ring lightweight titles

Tale of the tape
Boxer	Juan Manuel Márquez	Juan Díaz
Nickname	Dinamita ("Dynamite")	Baby Bull
Hometown	Mexico City, Mexico	Houston, Texas, U.S.
Pre-fight record	50–5–1 (37 KO)	35–3 (17 KO)
Height	5 ft 7 in (170 cm)	5 ft 6 in (168 cm)
Weight	133 1/2 lb (61 kg)	135 lb (61 kg)
Style	Orthodox	Orthodox
Recognition	WBA (Super), WBO, and The Ring lightweight champion The Ring No. 3 ranked pound-for-pound fighter 3-division world champion	Former unified lightweight champion

Result
- Márquez wins via 12-round unanimous decision (116-112, 118-110, 117-111)

Juan Manuel Márquez vs. Juan Díaz II, billed as The Rematch, was a boxing lightweight bout for Márquez's WBA (Super), WBO, and The Ring lightweight championship. This fight is a rematch of the 2009 Fight of the Year, where Márquez knocked out Díaz in the 9th round.

== Build up ==
Juan Díaz was a 3-1 underdog for his rematch against Juan Manuel Márquez, but the Houston fighter employed unimpeachable logic to argue that he would be victorious before the battle. In the rematch, Díaz, 26, intended to fine-tune rather than overhaul his game plan since he dictated the action and manhandled Márquez for much of the first fight before Márquez, 36, identified and exploited the chinks in his armour. Without revealing too much of his strategy, Díaz said his key to victory involved a delicate balance between brain, brawn, offense and defense.

Márquez, at 36 ten years older than his opponent, retained his WBO and WBA lightweight titles, and won this rematch by outpunching Díaz 288 to 155 on blows which connected. Márquez broke Díaz' lip to pieces with hard left jabs and hard overhand rights that scored, backing Díaz up during this bout. Márquez had a swollen right eye, but it was not a factor. The fight was a clean one. Díaz, a loser of four of his last six bouts, was studying for his law school entrance exam in preparation for a career change before the Márquez bout.

140 pound champion Amir Khan was in attendance and was mentioned as a possible future opponent for Márquez. Also in attendance former Heavyweight Champions Mike Tyson and Lennox Lewis, current WBA Champion David Haye as well as Junior Middleweight Contender Alfredo Angulo.

== The Fight ==
Prior to the bout, the WBO ordered the Márquez-Díaz winner to fight mandatory challenger Michael Katsidis. Márquez won the fight via unanimous decision by the official scores of 117-111, 116-112, and 118-110. After the Díaz rematch, Márquez stated that he was interested in pursuing a third fight with Manny Pacquiao. There was also the possibility of him moving up in weight again to face one of the belt-holders at 140 pounds: Timothy Bradley, Devon Alexander or Amir Khan, all of whom were fighting on HBO.

== Results ==
=== Televised ===
- Lightweight Championship bout: (Mexico) Juan Manuel Márquez (c) vs. (United States) Juan Diaz

Márquez defeated Díaz via unanimous decision (116–112, 118–110, 117–111).

- Light Welterweight bout: (United States) Robert Guerrero vs. (Cuba) Joel Casamayor

Guerrero defeated Casamayor via unanimous decision (98–89, 98–89, 97–90).

- Middleweight Championship bout: (Russia) Dmitry Pirog vs. (United States) Daniel Jacobs

Pirog defeated Jacobs via knockout at 0:57 of fifth round.

- Lightweight bout: (United States) Rocky Juarez vs. (Venezuela) Jorge Linares

Linares defeated Juarez via unanimous decision (99–90, 97–92, 99–90).

==== Televised Free ====
- Light Welterweight bout: (United States) Frankie Gomez vs. (United States) Ronnie Peterson

Gómez defeated Peterson via technical knockout at 2:14 of first round.

- Super Middleweight bout: (Australia) Sakio Bika vs. (France) Jean Paul Mendy

Mendy defeated Bika via disqualification (For hitting Mendy when he was down) at 1:15 of first round.

==== Untelevised ====
- Super Middleweight bout: (Mexico) Alfredo Contreras vs. (United Kingdom) George Groves

Groves defeated Contreras via technical knockout at 0:48 of sixth round.

- Heavyweight bout: (United States) Seth Mitchell vs. (United States) Derek Bryant

Mitchell defeated Bryant via technical knockout at 1:45 of first round.

- Lightweight bout: (Mexico) Juan Montiel vs. (United States) Mike Peralta

Montiel defeated Peralta via unanimous decision (58–55, 60–53, 58–55).

== Reported fight earnings ==
These are the payouts to the fighters as reported to the executive director of the Nevada State Athletic Commission Keith Kizer. These are the official purses as per the Nevada bout agreements, It does not include sponsor money or other common forms of revenue paid through other streams.

- Juan Manuel Márquez $1,000,000 vs. Juan Díaz ($540,000)
- Daniel Jacobs $200,000 vs. Dmitry Pirog ($50,000)
- Roberto Guerrero $75,000 vs. Joel Casamayor ($50,000)
- Rocky Juarez $45,000 vs. Jorge Linares ($30,000)
- Sakio Bika $18,000 vs. Jean Paul Mendy ($12,000)

Preceded by vs. Paulie Malignaggi	Juan Diaz's bouts July 31, 2010	Succeeded by vs. Pipino Cuevas, Jr
Preceded by vs. Floyd Mayweather	Juan Manuel Márquez's bouts July 31, 2010	Succeeded by vs. Michael Katsidis
