= Bobby Vanzie =

English boxer

Personal information
- Nickname: Viper
- Nationality: British
- Born: 11 January 1974 (age 52) Bradford, England
- Height: 5 ft 8 in (173 cm)
- Weight: lightweight

Boxing career
- Reach: 69 in (175 cm)
- Stance: Southpaw

Boxing record
- Total fights: 32
- Wins: 26
- Win by KO: 13
- Losses: 5
- Draws: 1

Bobby "Viper" Vanzie (born 11 January 1974) is a British former professional boxer who competed from 1994 to 2005. He held the British and Commonwealth lightweight titles between 1998 and 2001.

As an amateur Vanzie, trained at the Karmand Centre amateur boxing club, in the Barkerend area of Bradford, West Yorkshire.
