= Stathi Katsidis =

Australian jockey

Personal information
- Born: 19 February 1979 Toowoomba, Queensland, Australia
- Died: 19 October 2010 (aged 31) Brisbane, Australia
- Occupation: Jockey

Horse racing career
- Sport: Horse racing

Major racing wins
- The T J Smith (2000); Queensland Oaks (2006); Manikato Stakes (2007); Winter Stakes (2007); Australian Derby (2010); Randwick Guineas (2010); Brisbane Premiership wins: 2003–04 (58 Wins); 2005–06 (75 Wins); 2009–10 with Larry Cassidy (72 Wins)
- Updated on 22 November 2010

Stathi Katsidis (19 February 1979 – 19 October 2010) was an Australian jockey.

== Death ==
Katsidis was found dead at his Brisbane home a fortnight before he was due to ride in the Melbourne Cup. A coroner's report showed that the Champion jockey had a cocktail of drugs and alcohol in his system when he was found dead.
