= Mickey Vann =

British boxer and boxing referee

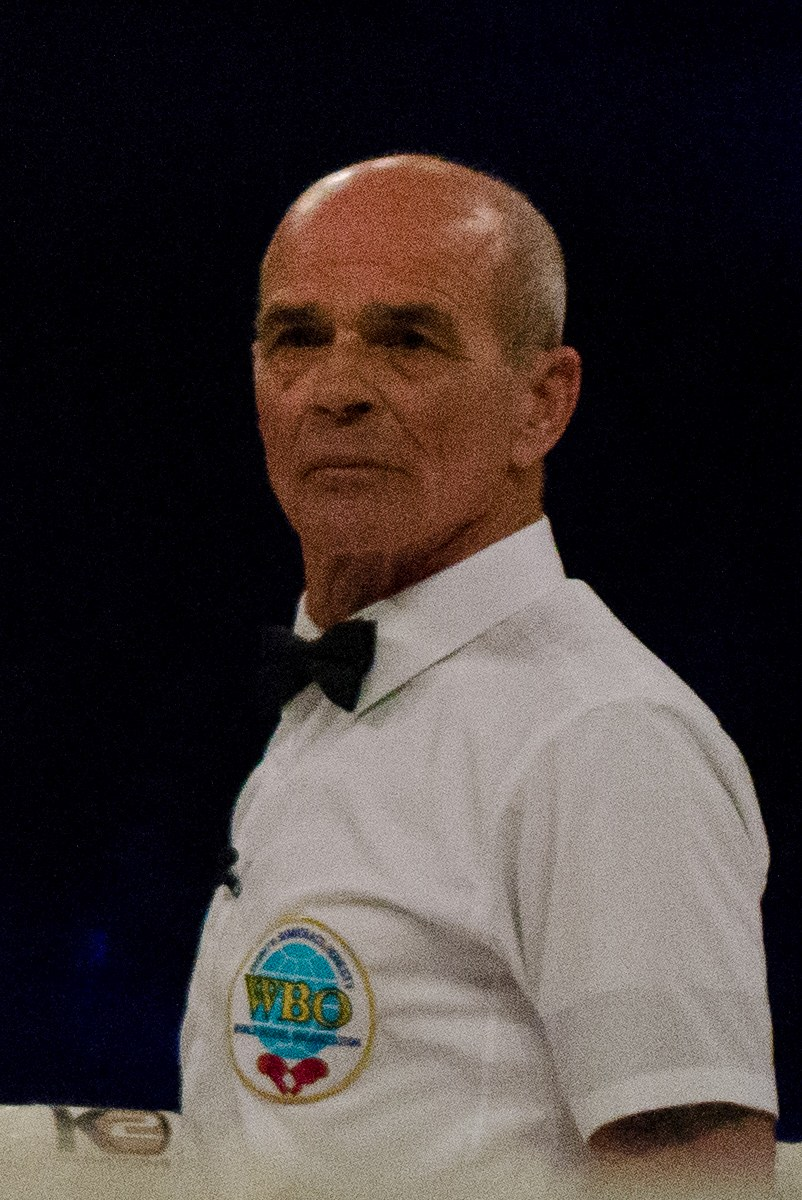

Personal information
- Nationality: (United Kingdom) British
- Born: Michael Van Norman; 29 December 1943 (age 82) London, England
- Weight: Featherweight

Boxing career
- Stance: Orthodox

Boxing record
- Total fights: 11
- Wins: 2
- Win by KO: 1
- Losses: 9
- Draws: 0
- No contests: 0

Michael Van Norman, better known as Mickey Vann (born 29 December 1943 in London, England) is a former boxer and British boxing referee. Vann was a 'Class A Star' referee and boxing judge. He arbitrated his first professional bout on 14 January 1985, and since has refereed many World, regional, and national title fights.

== Life as a Fighter ==
Before becoming a referee, Vann was a professional boxer. He fought 11 times, as a featherweight, winning two and losing nine. His first fight was on 24 April 1969 and his last was on 11 November 1970.

== Life as Referee and Autobiography ==
In September 2002 he disqualified challenger Stephen Smith as Ricky Hatton defended his WBU light welterweight title. Smith's father pushed Vann in the second round.

Mickey's autobiography, Give Me a Ring was published 2003 by Mainstream, revealing the colourful story of his childhood. Mickey was the son of Hal Denver (a friend of Elvis Presley)-who once threw knives at John Major's mother-and the grandson of The Silver King, a showman with The Elephant Man among his sideshows. Mickey's childhood was spent in fairs appearing as the giraffe necked woman, and at a Dickensian foster home.

His career in boxing has seen him take charge of many great champions. He was in charge of the world heavyweight 'Battle of Britain' in Cardiff between Lennox Lewis and Frank Bruno.

In his sixties, Mickey qualified to coach rugby league and has worked with Leeds Rhinos Academy. He also hopes to make it onto the veterans over 65 athletic team, having competed in events over 60 and 100 metres.

== Retired and Still A Championship Referee ==
Mickey was forcibly retired from by the British Boxing Board of Control regulation stating referees over 65 are no longer allowed to referee. However, he continues to referee international contests and is still regularly used as a judge by major world boxing bodies. On 14 July 2012, at Upton Park in London, Vann was still active refereeing in the professional ring in Great Britain despite the ban, serving as man in the middle for Liam Walsh versus Domenico Urbano vacant WBO European Lightweight title 12 round contest on the undercard of David Haye versus Derek Chisora. The card was sanctioned by Luxembourg Boxing Federation to the defiance of British Boxing Board of Control. At the start of the sixth round, Vann, still a strong referee, took a point from Urbano for illegal headbutting in the previous round, with Urbano bleeding from a facial cut. The cut was caused by a proper blow. Vann stopped the bout at 2:10 in the eighth round with Walsh giving Urbano a one-sided beating on his feet.
