= James Toney vs. Samuel Peter =

Boxing match

No Risk, No Reward
- Date: September 2, 2006
- Venue: Staples Center, Los Angeles, California, U.S.
- Title(s) on the line: WBC heavyweight title eliminator NABF and IBA heavyweight titles

Tale of the tape
Boxer	James Toney	Samuel Peter
Nickname	Lights Out	The Nigerian Nightmare
Hometown	Grand Rapids, Michigan, U.S.	Akwa Ibom, Nigeria
Pre-fight record	69–4–3 (1) (42 KO)	26–1 (22 KO)
Age	38 years	25 years, 11 months
Height	5 ft 9 in (175 cm)	6 ft 2 in (188 cm)
Weight	233 lb (106 kg)	220 lb (100 kg)
Style	Orthodox	Orthodox
Recognition	WBC; No. 1 Ranked Heavyweight; WBA; No. 4 Ranked Heavyweight; IBF; No. 7 Ranked Heavyweight; The Ring; No. 3 Ranked Heavyweight; IBA; Heavyweight Champion; 3-division world champion	WBC; No. 2 Ranked Heavyweight; IBF; No. 3 Ranked Heavyweight; WBA; No. 12 Ranked Heavyweight; The Ring; No. 8 Ranked Heavyweight; NABF; Heavyweight Champion

Result
- Peter wins via split decision (116–111, 116–111, 112–115)

James Toney vs. Samuel Peter, billed as No Risk, No Reward, was a professional boxing match contested on September 2, 2006, for the NABF and IBA heavyweight titles.

== Background ==
In early July 2006, it was announced that the WBC's number-two and number-three ranked contenders James Toney and Samuel Peter would meet in a WBC heavyweight title eliminator bout two months later, with the winner becoming the mandatory challenger to the winner of the Hasim Rahman–Oleg Maskaev WBC heavyweight title fight scheduled three weeks prior.

Both fighters were looking to rebound and get another change at a heavyweight title after suffering recent disappointing results. Toney's had challenged Rahman for the WBC heavyweight title in his previous fight, but had failed to capture the title after the fight was ruled a majority draw. Despite the inconclusive outcome, Rahman's promoter Bob Arum ruled out an immediate rematch as Rahman was already scheduled to face Maskaev, his mandatory challenger and the WBC's number-one ranked contender. Peter, meanwhile, had met Wladimir Klitschko, one of boxings premier heavyweights, the previous year in an IBF heavyweight title eliminator. Though he scored three knockdowns over Klitschko, he lost a close unanimous decision.

== The fights ==
=== Aiken vs. Guerrero ===
The chief support saw IBF featherweight champion Eric Aiken face No. 10 ranked contender Robert Guerrero in the first defence of the title he won in May against Valdemir Pereira. He had taken that fight on nine days’ notice as a last-minute replacement for Esham Pickering. A rematch with Pereira was scheduled but never materialized.

==== The fight ====
Guerrero would dominate the bout using inside fighting to neutralizing Aiken's power. Aiken's corner pulled him out after the eight round, giving Guerrero the victory.

At the time of the stoppage Guerrero led on all three scorecards 79–72, 80–71 and 80–71.

==== Aftermath ====
Aiken later admitted that he had broken his right hand. His cornerman Jerry Page said afterwards "His hand was hurting and it didn't look like he was going to turn it around. He was taking a beating out there, so we stopped it."

Preceded by vs. Valdemir Pereira	Eric Aiken's bouts 2 September 2006	Succeeded by vs. Cruz Carbajal
Preceded by vs. Gamaliel Díaz	Robert Guerrero's bouts 2 September 2006	Succeeded by vs. Orlando Salido

=== Main Event ===
In what was a very close fight, Peter was named the winner by way of split decision, with two judges scoring the fight 116–111 in his favor, while the other had Toney winning the bout with a score of 115–112. Toney had a clear advantage in punches, landing 239 of 560 punches for a 44% success rate, while Peter, though the busier fighter, threw 801 punches but landed only 175 for a 22% success rate. However, Peter nevertheless landed clean powerful shots, especially during the early portion of the fight and overcame a bloodied nose and a point deduction in the ninth for hitting Toney in the ears during a clinch to take the victory. The loss was Toney's first since being upset by Drake Thadzi in May 1997, he had had a 17–fight undefeated streak since.

== Fight card ==
Confirmed bouts:

Weight Class	Weight		vs.		Method	Round	Notes
Heavyweight	200+ lbs.	Samuel Peter	def.	James Toney	SD	12/12	^{note 1}
Featherweight	126 lbs.	Robert Guerrero	def.	Eric Aiken (c)	RTD	8/12	^{note 2}
Heavyweight	200+ lbs.	Travis Walker	def.	John Clark	TKO	2/8
Lightweight	135 lbs.	Jessica Rakoczy	vs.	Belinda Laracuente	NC	3/6x2
Cruiserweight	190 lbs.	Mike Marrone	def.	Ralph West	TKO	3/6
Super Middleweight	168 lbs.	Anthony Dirrell	def.	Billy Thompson	UD	6/6

^Note 1 For NABF and IBA heavyweight titles
^Note 2 For IBF Featherweight title

== Broadcasting ==
Country	Broadcaster
United States	Showtime

Preceded by vs. Hasim Rahman	James Toney's bouts 2 September 2006	Succeeded by Rematch
Preceded by vs. Julius Long	Samuel Peter's bouts 2 September 2006	Succeeded by Rematch
