= Hasim Rahman vs. James Toney =

Boxing Match

The Big Boys are Back
- Date: 18 March 2006
- Venue: Boardwalk Hall, Atlantic City, New Jersey
- Title(s) on the line: WBC Heavyweight Championship

Tale of the tape
Boxer	(United States) Hasim Rahman	(United States) James Toney
Nickname	"The Rock"	"Lights Out"
Hometown	Baltimore, Maryland	Grand Rapids, Michigan
Purse	$2,500,000	$2,000,000
Pre-fight record	41–5–1 (33 KO)	69–4–2 (43 KO)
Age	33 years, 4 months	37 years, 6 months
Height	6 ft 2 in (188 cm)	5 ft 9 in (175 cm)
Weight	238 lb (108 kg)	237 lb (108 kg)
Style	Orthodox	Orthodox
Recognition	WBC; Heavyweight Champion; The Ring; No. 2 Ranked Heavyweight	WBC; No. 2 Ranked Heavyweight; The Ring; No. 3 Ranked Heavyweight; Former 3-division world champion

Result
- Majority Draw

Hasim Rahman vs. James Toney, billed as The Big Boys are Back, was a professional boxing match contested on 18 March 2006 for the WBC heavyweight championship.

== Background ==
After failing to win any of next four fights following his April 2001 knockout victory over unified heavyweight champion Lennox Lewis (including being knockouted in the rematch), Hasim Rahman won all 5 of his bouts in 2004 to become the WBC number 1 ranked contender and the mandatory challenger to new heavyweight champion Vitali Klitschko. The fight was agreed for 30 April 2005, however Klitschko injured his thigh while training for the fight, so it was rescheduled for 18 June. As this date approached, Klitschko's camp said that the thigh had not fully healed; the WBC made 23 July the new fight date. Soon after this second postponement, Vitali's doctors reportedly discovered back injuries that they said demanded minor-yet-immediate corrective surgery. The WBC pushed the fight back again, this time to 12 November. After this third rescheduling, Rahman won a WBC "Interim" heavyweight bout against his friend Monte Barrett on 13 August by a wide unanimous decision.

On 7 November, five days before he was due to face Rahman, it was announced that Klitschko had suffered severe right knee injuries during training. After WBC said it would strip him of the championship, on November 9, Vitali Klitschko announced his retirement. The next the WBC voted to award its heavyweight championship to Rahman, making him a two-time heavyweight champion.

Shortly afterward James Toney's planned December bout with Rob Calloway was cancelled as Toney's promoter Dan Goosen entered talks with Rahman's promoter Don King make Toney Rahman's first defence. Wladimir Klitschko and Oleg Maskaev were also mentioned as options.

In the build up the bout Toney called out the now retired Lennox Lewis saying that "Lennox will return - he can't resist."

Rahman received a $2.5 million purse and Toney $2 million. The bookmakers had Toney a 2–1 on favourite to win the bout.

== The fight ==
The fight was largely uneventful with no knockdowns, but Rahman did suffer a deep cut over his left eye in the 5th round that worsened as the fight continued. Rahman threw 379 more punches than Toney.

Judge John Stewart scored the bout 117–111 to Rahman with the other two scoring it a 114–114 draw. Judges Tom Kaczmarek and Nobuaki Uratani had Toney leading by one point heading into the 12th with Rahman only retained the title by winning the final round. HBO's Harold Lederman had the bout scored 116-112 for Rahman and ESPN.com scored it 115-114 for Rahman.

== Aftermath ==
Following the bout Rahman's new promoter Bob Arum ruled out an immediate rematch against Toney, saying that he would have a mandatory defence against Oleg Maskaev, who had stopped Rahman in November 1999. History repeated itself and Maskaev knocked out Rahman again.

Toney's next bout was a WBC eliminator bout against Samuel Peter who won by split decision. He would ultimately have a rematch with Rahman in July 2008 where an accidental clash of heads in round three caused the bout to be ruled a no contest.

== Undercard ==
Confirmed bouts:

== Broadcasting ==
Country	Broadcaster
United States	HBO

Preceded by vs. Monte Barrett	Hasim Rahman's bouts 18 March 2006	Succeeded by vs. Oleg Maskaev
Preceded by vs. Dominick Guinn	James Toney's bouts 18 March 2006	Succeeded by vs. Samuel Peter
