= Mike Tyson vs. Brian Nielsen =

Boxing competition

- Date: 13 October 2001
- Venue: Parken Stadium, Copenhagen, Denmark

Tale of the tape
Boxer	Mike Tyson	Brian Nielsen
Nickname	Iron	Super
Hometown	Catskill, New York, U.S.	Korsør, West Zealand, Denmark
Purse	$4,000,000	$500,000
Pre-fight record	48–3 (2) (42 KO)	62–1 (43 KO)
Age	35 years, 3 months	36 years, 6 months
Height	5 ft 10 in (178 cm)	6 ft 3 in (191 cm)
Weight	239 lb (108 kg)	259 3/4 lb (118 kg)
Style	Orthodox	Orthodox
Recognition	WBC; No. 1 Ranked Heavyweight; IBF; No. 5 Ranked Heavyweight; WBA; No. 6 Ranked Heavyweight; Former undisputed heavyweight champion	IBC heavyweight champion

Result
- Tyson wins via 6th-round RTD

Mike Tyson vs. Brian Nielsen was a professional boxing match contested on 13 October 2001.

== Background ==
Since returning to boxing in January 1999, former Undisputed Heavyweight Champion Mike Tyson was undefeated in the five fights he had fought between 1999 and 2000, notching three knockout wins over Francois Botha, Julius Francis and Lou Savarese, and fighting two no-contests with Orlin Norris and Andrew Golota. Tyson's previous fight had come against Golota almost a year earlier on October 20, 2000. Tyson dominated Golota for two rounds before Golota decided to quit between the second and third rounds. Originally, Tyson was rewarded with a technical knockout victory, but it was later changed to a no-contest in January 2001 after a post-fight drug test revealed that Tyson had tested positive for marijuana. Just days before Tyson's positive test became known to the public, he was also issued a three-month suspension by the State of Michigan, which the Nevada Athletic Commission agreed to uphold, though the suspension had little effect on Tyson's boxing schedule as he had already announced his intentions to take those three months off. After serving the suspension, Tyson's next fight was initially going to be against David Izon in June 2001, but the fight was postponed as Showtime attempted to work out a mega-deal that would see Tyson face WBC and IBF Heavyweight champion Hasim Rahman in what would have been Tyson's first title shot since his controversial 1997 fight with Evander Holyfield, but Rahman would go on to have a rematch with Lennox Lewis instead. As such, Tyson moved on from his planned match with Izon and instead agree to meet Danish fighter Brian Nielsen, whose 62–1 record was one of the most impressive in boxing history, but a large majority of his fights had come against either little-known journeymen or former contenders who were past their prime (including former Tyson adversaries Tony Tubbs, Larry Holmes and Orlin Norris). At a press conference to promote the fight, controversy arose when Nielsen called Tyson a "abekat", a Danish word meaning "monkey cat" that was slang for someone who acts foolish, but the word was erroneously translated as "monkey man". Tyson, thinking it was a racial slur, took offense and proclaimed that the remark would "make me punish him even more than I had planned."

== The fight ==
Tyson would have little trouble with Nielsen, constantly landing punch after punch to the defensively challenged Nielsen who offered little movement and largely stood right in front of Tyson. With around 35 seconds left in the third round, Tyson was able to land a six-punch combination to the head of Nielsen that sent Nielsen into the ropes and down onto the canvas in what was only the second knockdown of his career. Nielsen was able to get back up and the fight resumed with 16 seconds, Tyson attempted to land more power punches in hopes of gaining another knockdown, but Nielsen clinched Tyson to ensure that he would make it to the next round. Just before the round ended, Tyson landed an accidental low blow on Nielsen. Though Nielsen was clearly in pain and could now take up to five minutes to recover, he chose to only take a minute and a half before proceeding to the fourth round. Tyson would continue to dominate the remainder of the fight and by the end of sixth round, Nielsen's left eye, which had been cut in the second, was completely shut. As the bell rang to start the seventh round, Nielsen remained seated in his corner and informed referee Steve Smoger that he could not continue. After Smoger confirmed Nielsen's decision, he awarded the victory to Tyson by way of technical knockout. For Tyson it was his longest fight since his 11th round loss to Evander Holyfield in 1996. In between his first fight with Holyfield and his sixth round win over Nielsen, Tyson had six fights, none of which made it past the fifth round.

== Aftermath ==
Tyson's victory kept him the WBC's number one contender and mandatory challenger to the winner of the Hasim Rahman–Lennox Lewis rematch, which Lewis would win by fourth round knockout the following month. Originally, Tyson stated that he would like to get at least two more fights in before facing Lewis and he announced his intention to face Ray Mercer in January 2002. In December, Lewis sued Tyson in an attempt to ensure that Tyson would face him next rather than Mercer. Two days later, Tyson announced the cancellation of his match with Mercer and his intentions to proceed with his long awaited title shot against Lewis. After several delays, Tyson and Lewis met on June 8, 2002 in Memphis, Tennessee. Tyson started off with a strong first round, but would lose the next six before being knocked out in the eighth round.

== Undercard ==
Confirmed bouts:

== Broadcasting ==
Country	Broadcaster
Australia	Main Event
United Kingdom	Sky Sports
United States	Showtime

Preceded by vs. Andrew Golota	Mike Tyson's bouts 13 October 2001	Succeeded by vs. Lennox Lewis
Preceded by vs. Orlin Norris	Brian Nielsen's bouts 13 October 2001	Succeeded by vs. Ken Murphy
