= Up Close =

American television sports program

Up Close is an American sports interview show that aired on ESPN+ in 2021 and had aired on ESPN from 1981 to 2001.

== History ==
=== Early years ===
The program debuted in 1981 on USA Network and was created by the advertising agency Foote, Cone and Belding to advertise one of its clients, Mazda cars. Mazda SportsLook moved to ESPN in 1982 and was subsequently rechristened Up Close.

=== Time slots ===
Once it arrived at ESPN, SportsLook was slotted before SportsCenter. The show aired at 6 p.m. Eastern time, followed by SportsCenter at 6:30. The show remained in that slot until September 1999, when SportsCenter was expanded to an hour and Up Close, as it was then renamed, moved to 5:30 p.m.

=== Hosts ===
The original host of Up Close was Roy Firestone, who served as host for 13 years. During this time, both Firestone and the show won many CableACE Awards, then the gold standard for cable television programming. When Firestone left in 1994, Chris Myers became the new host; he stayed there until 1998 and enjoyed the highest ratings in the history of the program. Gary Miller was the show's host when Up Close signed off in 2001. Sage Steele became the host when the show was brought back in 2021.

==== Notable interviews ====
Roy Firestone was the subject of extensive criticism regarding what has been characterized as a "softball" and "chummy" 1992 ESPN interview with O. J. Simpson (or, as he called Simpson in the interview, "Juice") during which he asserted that Simpson's January 1989 arrest and subsequent conviction for beating his wife, Nicole, unfairly distorted Simpson's reputation to the point that Simpson was portrayed by the press as "the bad guy" merely for having "a little bit too much to drink." He further expressed his annoyance with the press' reports of Simpson's arrest and conviction for beating Nicole because the press, in reporting the facts, had the temerity to portray Simpson as "a wife beater" (the offense for which he was convicted). He then gave Simpson a free pass to downplay the criminal beating of Nicole and characterize it as an argument that got a "little loud," asserting that he and Nicole were "both guilty." These assertions, which were contrary to the public record, were not only unchallenged by Firestone, but were actively encouraged and endorsed by him. This criticism was renewed upon the release of the documentary OJ: Made In America which included an excerpt from the interview in which Firestone expresses these sentiments and where the "chumminess" is apparent. Firestone has recently expressed remorse for how he handled the interview, stating, "The Simpson interview is one of the most tragic examples of how the media (including me) and the public trusted and accommodated their heroes, believing their mythology and perpetuating their deification."

Chris Myers would later also interview O. J. Simpson live in November 1995; this was Simpson's first full-length interview since he was acquitted in the "trial of the century" a month earlier.

Some interviews, notably those with college basketball coaches Jim Valvano and Bob Knight, are still occasionally shown on ESPN Classic under the name Up Close Classics.

During an August 2001 taping, an interview with boxers Lennox Lewis and Hasim Rahman infamously turned into a physical altercation after the two exchanged personal insults in the buildup to their second fight that November.

=== Broadcast locations ===
In 1999, Up Close broadcasts were moved from studios in Los Angeles to the ESPN Zone in Anaheim, on Disneyland property.

=== Cancellation ===
Declining ratings and the rise of a confrontational style of talk eventually led to the show's cancellation, which occurred on Friday, October 19, 2001. Three days later, Up Close was replaced with Unscripted with Chris Connelly, which updated the Up Close format to be more contemporary. The new program lasted less than a year.

=== 2021 revival ===
On May 27, 2021, SportsCenter anchor Sage Steele revealed during the show's noon ET episode that she would host a reboot of Up Close, exclusively on the digital subscription service ESPN+. The first episode of the reimagined show was made available for streaming to ESPN+ subscribers on June 30, 2021.
