= Fahprakorb Rakkiatgym =

Thai boxer

Personal information
- Nationality: Thailand
- Born: Prayat Sawai-nga (ประหยัด ไสวงาม); August 7, 1975 (age 50) Khon Kaen, Thailand
- Height: 5 ft 7 in (170 cm)
- Weight: Bantamweight; Junior featherweight Featherweight

Boxing career
- Stance: Southpaw

Boxing record
- Total fights: 55
- Wins: 51
- Win by KO: 34
- Losses: 4
- Draws: 0
- No contests: 0

Fahprakorb Rakkiatgym (Thai: ฟ้าประกอบ รักเกียรติยิม; born; August 7, 1975 in Khon Kaen, Thailand) is a professional boxer from Thailand.

He was a former World Boxing Federation (WBF) World Champion in Junior featherweight division, and he had the opportunity to challenge the International Boxing Federation (IBF) World Champion twice but was unsuccessful. In the first challenge he lost to Manny Pacquiao by TKO in the first round at Rizal Memorial College, Davao City, the Philippines in 2002, and the second in 2006 when he lost to Valdemir Pereira by unanimous score at Foxwoods Resort Casino, state of Connecticut.

== Professional boxing record ==
55 fights	51 wins	4 losses
By knockout	33	2
By decision	18	2

No.	Result	Record	Opponent	Type	Round, time	Date	Location	Notes
55	Loss	51–4	Valdemir Pereira	UD	12	20 Jan 2006	Foxwoods Resort Casino, Mashantucket, Connecticut, U.S.	For vacant IBF featherweight title
54	Win	51–3	Romualdo Mahinay	KO	3 (6)	22 Apr 2005	Por Kungpao Restaurant, Bangkok, Thailand	
53	Win	50–3	Pedro Malco	TKO	5 (12)	28 Mar 2005	Thonburi College, Nongkaem, Thailand	Retained IBF Pan Pacific featherweight title
52	Win	49–3	Bobby Pacquiao	KO	9 (12)	18 Feb 2005	Pattaya, Thailand	Retained IBF Pan Pacific featherweight title
51	Win	48–3	Alvin Clerino	KO	2 (12)	15 Dec 2004	Chonburi, Thailand	Retained IBF Pan Pacific featherweight title
50	Win	47–3	Ronaldi Kapughu	KO	2 (12)	12 Nov 2004	Bang Pakong, Thailand	Retained IBF Pan Pacific featherweight tirle
49	Win	46–3	Jack Asis	TKO	5 (12)	12 Oct 2004	Petchaburi, Thailand	Retained IBF Pan Pacific featherweight title
48	Win	45–3	Wang Jung-hyun	UD	12	10 Sep 2004	Nakhon Si Thammarat, Thailand	Retained IBF Pan Pacific featherweight title
47	Win	44–3	Dondon Lapuz	TKO	7 (12)	9 Aug 2004	Bangkok, Thailand	Retained IBF Pan Pacific featherweight title
46	Win	43–3	Sonny Manakane	KO	4 (12)	27 Apr 2004	Nonthai School, Nakhon Ratchasima, Thailand	Retained IBF Pan Pacific featherweight title
45	Win	42–3	Roberto Oyan	TKO	6 (12)	19 Mar 2004	Nonthaburi, Thailand	Retained IBF Pan Pacific featherweight title
44	Win	41–3	Jackson Asiku	UD	12	26 Feb 2004	Watt Noy, Bangkok, Thailand	Retained IBF Pan Pacific featherweight title
43	Win	40–3	Roberto Dalisay	UD	12	14 Oct 2003	Thammasart University Gymnasium, Bangkok, Thailand	Won vacant IBF Pan Pacific featherweight title
42	Win	39–3	Buthait Rachman	KO	3 (?)	18 Jul 2003	Nakhon Si Thammarat, Thailand	
41	Win	38–3	Rudy Tacoque	UD	8	18 Mar 2003	Phetchaburi, Thailand	
40	Loss	37–3	Manny Pacquiao	TKO	1 (12), 2:46	26 Oct 2002	Rizal Memorial Colleges Gym, Davao City, Philippines	For IBF super bantamweight title
39	Win	37–2	Mohammed Cifota	KO	2 (?)	29 Mar 2002	Bangkok, Thailand	
38	Win	36–2	Anthony Hanna	PTS	8	8 Dec 2001	Goresbrook Leisure Centre, Dagenham, England	
37	Win	35–2	Nestor Martin Farias	UD	8	22 Aug 2001	Carousel Casino, Hammanskraal, South Africa	
36	Win	34–2	Duncan Karanja	PTS	10	19 May 2001	Bangkok, Thailand	
35	Win	33–2	Edison Diaz	UD	12	23 Mar 2001	Bangkok, Thailand	Retained IBF Inter-Continental super bantamweight title
34	Win	32–2	Ravil Mukhamadiyarov	TKO	4 (12)	28 Sep 2000	Bangkok, Thailand	Retained IBF Inter-Continental super bantamweight title
33	Win	31–2	Said Chaku	TKO	4 (12)	28 Jul 2000	Hod, Thailand	Retained IBF Inter-Continental super bantamweight title
32	Win	30–2	Cesar Abundis	KO	4 (?)	30 Jun 2000	Bangkok, Thailand	
31	Win	29–2	Andrian Kaspari	SD	12	24 Dec 1999	Bangkok, Thailand	Won vacant IBF Inter-Continental super bantamweight title
30	Win	28–2	Bobby Rabanos	KO	3 (10)	5 Nov 1999	Chiang Mai, Thailand	
29	Win	27–2	Arnold Sniper	TKO	6 (10)	22 Oct 1999	Ratchaburi, Thailand	
28	Win	26–2	Rolando Pritos	TKO	2 (10)	27 Aug 1999	Kalasin, Thailand	
27	Win	25–2	Vuyani Moss	KO	6 (12)	27 Dec 1997	Varich School, Varichabhumi, Sakon Nakhon, Thailand	Retained WBF (Federation) bantamweight title
26	Win	24–2	Lucas Matthew	TKO	6 (12)	1 Aug 1997	Seka School, Nong Khai, Thailand	Retained WBF (Federation) bantamweight title
25	Win	23–2	Sergio Gonzalez	KO	2 (12), 1:11	30 May 1997	Phraram 9 Plaza, Bangkok, Thailand	Retained WBF (Federation) bantamweight title
24	Win	22–2	Siza Taho	KO	2 (12), 2:55	4 Apr 1997	Hod Chiengmai, Thailand	Retained WBF (Federation) bantamweight title
23	Win	21–2	Edgar Garcia	TKO	7 (12), 0:38	28 Feb 1997	Nakornthong Parkview, Bangbuathong, Thailand	Retained WBF (Federation) bantamweight title
22	Win	20–2	Barry Sewell Jnr	TKO	4 (12), 1:46	1 Jun 1996	Bangsapannoi Pier, Prachuap Khiri Khan, Thailand	Retained WBF (Federation) bantamweight title
21	Win	19–2	Johnny Binge	KO	4 (?)	22 Mar 1996	Sairee Beach, Koh Tao, Thailand	
20	Win	18–2	Dodong Virtudazo	KO	2 (12)	26 Aug 1995	Bangkok, Thailand	Retained WBF (Federation) bantamweight title
19	Win	17–2	Kasmana Silehu	PTS	10	1 Apr 1995	Amnat Charoen, Thailand	
18	Win	16–2	Boualem Belkif	UD	12	22 Oct 1994	Southern Association of Thailand, Bangkok, Thailand	Won inaugural WBF (Federation) bantamweight title
17	Win	15–2	Albert Resley	KO	2 (6)	14 Aug 1994	Southern Association of Thailand, Bangkok, Thailand	
16	Win	14–2	Poly Carllo	KO	2 (6)	23 Apr 1994	Channel 7 Studios, Bangkok, Thailand	
15	Win	13–2	Steven Togelang	KO	4 (6)	6 Feb 1994	Bangkok, Thailand	
14	Win	12–2	Agus Ekajaya	PTS	10	21 Dec 1993	Indonesia	
13	Win	11–2	Kwanchai Sithsopa	KO	2 (6)	10 Dec 1993	Bangkok, Thailand	
12	Win	10–2	Bulan Bugiarso	PTS	10	28 Oct 1993	Indonesia	
11	Win	9–2	Satorn Sithfahkamrom	KO	2 (6)	16 Oct 1993	Bangkok, Thailand	
10	Win	8–2	Sangatit Worsuteera	PTS	6	15 Sep 1993	Bangkok, Thailand	
9	Win	7–2	Anupong Saohin Srisuk	PTS	6	21 Jul 1993	Bangkok, Thailand	
8	Win	6–2	Chatree Muangrayong	KO	2 (6)	21 Jun 1993	Bangkok, Thailand	
7	Loss	5–2	Kaaj Chartbandit	PTS	6	28 Apr 1993	Bangkok, Thailand	
6	Win	5–1	Pornchai Sithpraprom	PTS	6	28 Feb 1993	Bangkok, Thailand	
5	Loss	4–1	Anupong Saohin Srisuk	KO	4 (6)	1 Feb 1993	Bangkok, Thailand	
4	Win	4–0	Chalermsak Sithsoon	KO	4 (6)	2 Dec 1992	Bangkok, Thailand	
3	Win	3–0	Yodchai Sithsomwang	KO	1 (6)	12 Nov 1992	Bangkok, Thailand	
2	Win	2–0	Charoonsak Sor Vorapin	PTS	6	5 Oct 1992	Bangkok, Thailand	
1	Win	1–0	Taweedej Sor Vorapin	PTS	6	6 Sep 1992	Crocodile Farm, Samut Prakan, Thailand	
