= Lennox Lewis vs. Mike Tyson =

Boxing competition

Lewis–Tyson: Is On
- Date: June 8, 2002
- Venue: The Pyramid, Memphis, Tennessee, U.S.
- Title(s) on the line: WBC, IBF, IBO, and The Ring heavyweight titles

Tale of the tape
| Boxer | Lennox Lewis | Mike Tyson |
| Nickname | The Lion | Iron |
| Hometown | London, England | Catskill, New York, U.S. |
| Purse | $17,500,000 | $17,500,000 |
| Pre-fight record | 39–2–1 (30 KO) | 49–3 (2) (43 KO) |
| Age | 36 years, 9 months | 35 years, 11 months |
| Height | 6 ft 5 in (196 cm) | 5 ft 10 in (178 cm) |
| Weight | 249 1/4 lb (113 kg) | 234 1/2 lb (106 kg) |
| Style | Orthodox | Orthodox |
| Recognition | WBC, IBF, IBO, and The Ring; Heavyweight Champion | WBC; No. 1 Ranked Heavyweight; IBF; No 12 Ranked Heavyweight; Former undisputed heavyweight champion |

Result
- Lewis wins via 8th-round knockout

Lennox Lewis vs. Mike Tyson, billed as Lewis–Tyson: Is On, was a heavyweight professional boxing match that took place on June 8, 2002, at the Pyramid Arena in Memphis, Tennessee. The defending unified WBC, IBF, IBO, and The Ring champion Lennox Lewis defeated former undisputed heavyweight champion Mike Tyson by knockout in the eighth round. Prior to the event, Lewis was awarded The Ring magazine heavyweight title, which had been vacant since the late 1980s and was last held by Tyson.

== Background ==
A Tyson-Lewis bout seemed imminent in 1996 when Tyson was the WBC title-holder and Lewis had beaten Lionel Butler in what the sanctioning body had deemed an elimination bout for the top contender's slot. Discussions between both men's camps began in early 1996 and extended to the fall with Lewis and his promoters rejecting multiple offers which ranged between $8 million-to-$16 million before the challenger eventually accepted a sum of $4 million to postpone negotiations and allow Tyson to face WBA champion Bruce Seldon in a unification bout. After beating Seldon, Tyson chose to forfeit his WBC belt and would go on to lose his first defense of the WBA title to former two-time unified heavyweight champion Evander Holyfield.

Following his 1997 disqualification loss to Holyfield in the rematch of their first bout, Tyson had been fined and had his license revoked by the Nevada State Athletic Commission for having twice-bitten Holyfield during the fight. Tyson made his initial return to boxing in 1999 before being sentenced to a second prison term later that year.

Following several more bouts after his release, Tyson signed to face former WBO title-holder Ray Mercer in January 2001. However, Lewis and his camp feared a future fight with Tyson could be jeopardized should the former champion lose and thus filed a legal injunction to prevent the match with Mercer from happening, forcing Tyson to cancel the bout and instead face the reigning WBC/IBF champion.

The fight was originally scheduled for April 6, 2002 in Las Vegas. However, Nevada refused to grant Tyson a license after a press conference brawl between Lewis and Tyson (see below). Several other states refused Tyson a license before Memphis finally bid US $12 million in order to host the fight.

The referee for the fight was Eddie Cotton, officiating his 20th world title bout. Alfred Buqwana of South Africa, Anek Hongtongkam of Thailand and Bob Logist of Belgium were appointed as judges, as both the WBC and the Tennessee Athletic Commission wanted judges from different continents. Lewis weighed in at 249.25 lb (113 kg) and Tyson at 234 lb (106 kg) (the second highest of his career).

The fight was promoted by Main Events and was a pay-per-view shown as a joint collaboration between HBO and Showtime in the United States and on Sky Box Office in the United Kingdom. The joint promotion was a rarity as at the time HBO and Showtime were arch-rivals in American boxing broadcasting, though it would later be repeated in 2015 with the Floyd Mayweather Jr. vs. Manny Pacquiao match. HBO's Jim Lampley called the fight alongside Showtime's Bobby Czyz, and in addition each fighter was introduced by a ring announcer allied with a specific network: Lewis had HBO's Michael Buffer introduce him, while Jimmy Lennon Jr. of Showtime did the same for Tyson. It was the highest-grossing event in pay-per-view history, generating US $106.9 million from 1.95 million buys in the U.S., until it was surpassed by De La Hoya vs. Mayweather in 2007. In 2013, Mayweather vs. Álvarez surpassed the gross revenue generated from pay-per-view buys.

However, the ticket sales were slow because they were priced as high as US $2,400, but a crowd of 15,327 turned up to see the fight. Lewis entered the bout as 2/1 favorite.

Among the celebrities in attendance were Samuel L. Jackson, Denzel Washington, Tom Cruise, Britney Spears, Clint Eastwood, Ben Affleck, Hugh Hefner, Halle Berry, Richard Gere, Dwayne "The Rock" Johnson, Vince McMahon, The Undertaker, LL Cool J, Tyra Banks, Wesley Snipes, Donald Trump, Kevin Bacon, Chris Webber, Michael Jordan, Magic Johnson, Morgan Freeman, Alec Baldwin, and former heavyweight champion Evander Holyfield.

=== Press conference brawl ===
On January 22, 2002, at a press conference held in New York to publicize the bout, a brawl involving the two boxers and their entourages occurred.

Tyson went on stage at the Hudson Theatre and stared in the direction of where Lewis was to appear. As soon as Lewis appeared, Tyson quickly walked toward him and appeared to be about to assault Lewis. One of Lewis's bodyguards attempted to block Tyson's access to Lewis before Tyson threw a left hook in the bodyguard's direction.

The two boxers rolled on the floor with personnel from both camps getting involved.

During the fracas, WBC president José Sulaimán claimed to be knocked out when he hit his head on the table. He later filed a US $56 million lawsuit against Lewis and Tyson for injuries caused in the scuffle. Sulaiman claims he was spat on and Tyson threatened to kill him, when he got up after being knocked out.

Tyson was accused of- and later admitted to having bitten Lewis' leg amidst the melee, resulting in the champion being required to receive a tetanus shot.

Following the brawl Tyson came to the edge of the podium, grabbed his crotch and started shouting expletives at someone in the crowd who was later guessed to be either Lewis's mother or a female photographer. Then he overheard freelance journalist Mark Malinowski suggesting that he should be in a straitjacket, which prompted him to issue another profanity-laden tirade, this time directed at Malinowski. He repeatedly referred to the reporter as a "punk white boy" and a "faggot", and punctuated his oration by vowing to "fuck [Malinowski] 'till you love me". The brawl at the press conference for this fight was named The Ring magazine Event of the Year for 2002.

== The fight ==
Round one: The early moments of the fight provided arguably the most evenly fought display of back-and-forth action between Tyson and Lewis as they started by jabbing. Just before 30 seconds had elapsed, Tyson leaned forward with a left jab at Lewis; then lunged towards his midsection, landing a right-left combination of body blows before Lewis could manage to steer him backward with three effectively-landed uppercuts of his own. As they subsequently traded body shots, Tyson ended the sequence by missing on a wild left hook. In the middle of the round, Lewis began to clinch to fend off Tyson's repeated attempts to at body attacks, keeping him at bay. But with just under a minute remaining in the round, Tyson connected with a left hook to Lewis' jaw, catching him off-guard. Lewis stumbled then recovered with another clinch, and pushed Tyson into the ropes while landing another jab. Tyson won the round.

Round two: Both fighters opened with jabs, before Cotton warned Lewis twice for holding. Lewis landed a number of effective punches on Tyson as he tried to come in, including several powerful uppercuts that kept Tyson staggering backwards.

Round three: Lewis opened with more jabs. Later in the round Tyson went on to headbutt Lewis before connecting with a left hook, but Lewis managed to cut Tyson above his right eye later in the round.

Round four: Again Tyson rushed out at the bell, but Lewis then landed two strong jabs before landing a big right. With ten seconds left in the round Lewis landed a couple of punches on Tyson who went down. Referee Eddie Cotton ruled it a slip and deducted a point from Lewis for pushing Tyson down. Tyson's face was starting to swell.

Round five: Cotton stopped the fight and talked to Lewis again in the fifth round about pushing. As the round went on, a visibly weakened Tyson began throwing fewer and fewer punches and struggling to land.

Round six: Lewis stayed in control by mostly connecting on jabs. With just over a minute left in the round, Tyson was able to land a couple of shots which had created swelling just below Lewis' left eye, but by the end of the round Tyson had been cut above both eyes.

Round seven: Lewis put Tyson off balance with a crushing right hook. Lewis once more was overpowering in taking the round, with what was little resistance at that point, out-landing Tyson 31-4.

Round eight: with 47 seconds left, Lewis knocked Tyson down for the second time in the round. As Tyson lay on his back, he was counted out at 2:25 mark, as he only made back up to one knee before being counted out. Lennox Lewis was declared the winner by KO.

== Aftermath ==
A month later, Lewis vacated the IBF title when he declined to face Chris Byrd, the mandatory challenger, instead signing to fight former title-challenger Kirk Johnson. Following an injury to Johnson during training camp, Lewis and Vitaly Klitschko would agree to face each other on short notice in 2003. The fight with Tyson would be Lewis' last as a unified champion and he retired in 2004 with just one major title, the WBC belt, remaining in his possession.

The Lewis-Tyson bout was named The Ring magazine Knockout of the Year for 2002.

== Undercard ==
Confirmed bouts:

- (Philippines) Manny Pacquiao KOs (Colombia) Jorge Eliecer Julio in the second round for the IBF junior featherweight title.
- (Cuba) Joel Casamayor KOs (Mexico) Juan Jose Arias in the eighth round.
- (United Kingdom) David Starie KOs (United States) Roni Martinez in the first round.
- (United States) Malik Scott defeats (United States) Dan Ward via unanimous decision.
- (United States) Jeff Lacy KOs (United States) Kevin Hall in the third round.
- (Australia) Nedal Hussein defeats (Philippines) Ronnie Longakit by unanimous decision.
- (United States) Rico Hoye KOs (United States) George Klinesmith in the second round.
- (Canada) Corinne Van Ryck DeGroot defeats (United States) Jo Wyman via unanimous decision.
- (United States) Cornelius Bundrage defeats (United States) Anthony Bowman via unanimous decision.

== Broadcasting ==
| Country | Broadcaster |
|---|---|
| Argentina | TyC Sports |
| Mexico | Televisa |
| Philippines | NBN 4 |
| United Kingdom | Sky Sports |
| United States | English: HBO / Showtime; Spanish: Univision |

| Preceded by vs. Hasim Rahman II | Lennox Lewis' bouts 8 June 2002 | Succeeded by vs. Vitali Klitschko |
| Preceded by vs. Brian Nielsen | Mike Tyson's bouts 8 June 2002 | Succeeded by vs. Clifford Etienne |
