= Eric Aiken =

American boxer

Personal information
- Nickname: Mighty Mouse
- Born: April 8, 1980 (age 46) Marysville, Ohio, U.S.
- Height: 5 ft 7 in (170 cm)
- Weight: Featherweight

Boxing career
- Reach: 71 in (180 cm)
- Stance: Orthodox

Boxing record
- Total fights: 29
- Wins: 16
- Win by KO: 12
- Losses: 11
- Draws: 1
- No contests: 1

Eric Aiken (born April 8, 1980 in Marysville, Ohio) is a former professional boxer. He is the former IBF world featherweight champion.

== Early life ==
According to the February 1, 2008 broadcast of Friday Night Fights on ESPN2, Aiken was a paralegal before turning professional. As an amateur, he trained at the Alexandria Boxing Club. During his amateur career, Aiken compiled a 97-5 record with 47 knockouts. In addition, he won numerous state titles, the Mayor's Cup and the Nationals twice.

== Pro career ==
On April 1, 2006, Aiken defeated former IBF bantamweight champion Tim Austin by sixth-round TKO. Only one month later (on May 13, 2006), Aiken challenged undefeated IBF featherweight champion Valdemir Pereira for the title. In the bout, Aiken knocked down Pereira in rounds four and five. Throughout the bout, Pereira hit Aiken with shots that were below the belt, and he was penalized one point in rounds six and seven. After another below the belt shot by Pereira in round eight, the referee disqualified him, and Aiken was awarded the title.

Aiken lost the title on September 2, 2006 against Robert Guerrero.

On February 1, 2008, in Monroeville, Pennsylvania, Aiken lost to Monty Meza-Clay by seventh-round technical knockout.

== Professional boxing record ==
29 fights	16 wins	11 losses
By knockout	12	6
By decision	3	5
By disqualification	1	0
Draws	1	
No contests	1	

No.	Result	Record	Opponent	Type	Round, time	Date	Location	Notes
29	Loss	16–11–1 (1)	Adam Lopez	TKO	2 (4), 2:09	2015-12-12	AT&T Center, San Antonio, Texas, U.S.	
28	Loss	16–10–1 (1)	Bayan Jargal	TKO	1 (8), 2:24	2012-11-01	Hilton & Towers, Washington, D.C., U.S.	
27	Loss	16–9–1 (1)	Rafael Márquez	KO	1 (10), 2:26	2012-05-05	Auditorio Fausto Gutierrez Moreno, Tijuana, Mexico	
26	NC	16–8–1 (1)	Edner Cherry	NC	1 (10), 3:00	2011-09-23	Seminole Hard Rock Hotel & Casino, Hollywood, Florida, U.S.	
25	Loss	16–8–1	Todd Wilson	UD	6	2011-09-10	Patriot Center, Fairfax, Virginia, U.S.	
24	Loss	16–7–1	Monty Meza Clay	TKO	7 (10), 0:39	2008-02-01	Expo Mart, Monroeville, Pennsylvania, U.S.	
23	Loss	16–6–1	Thomas Mashaba	TKO	9 (12), 1:51	2007-11-12	Emperor's Palace, Kempton Park, South Africa	For IBO featherweight title
22	Draw	16–5–1	Cruz Carbajal	SD	10	2007-03-16	Rockingham Park, Salem, New Hampshire, U.S.	
21	Loss	16–5	Robert Guerrero	RTD	8 (12), 3:00	Sep 2, 2006	Staples Center, Los Angeles, California, U.S.	Lost IBF featherweight title
20	Win	16–4	Valdemir Pereira	DQ	8 (12), 1:37	2006-05-13	TD Garden, Boston, Massachusetts, U.S.	Won IBF featherweight title
19	Win	15–4	Tim Austin	TKO	6 (10), 2:21	2006-04-01	Wolstein Center, Cleveland, Ohio, U.S.	
18	Loss	14–4	Johnnie Edwards	UD	6	2006-03-18	Ohio-Lausche Building, Columbus, Ohio, U.S.	
17	Win	14–3	Darby Smart	TKO	7 (10), 1:13	2006-01-20	Voinovich Center, Columbus, Ohio, U.S.	Won vacant NABA featherweight title
16	Win	13–3	John Scalzi	TKO	1 (6), 2:15	2005-12-09	Wheeling Island Hotel, Wheeling, West Virginia, U.S.	
15	Loss	12–3	Leo Martinez	SD	6	2005-10-01	Nationwide Arena, Columbus, Ohio, U.S.	
14	Win	12–2	Terrance Roy	KO	2 (6), 1:02	2005-01-08	Emerald Queen Casino, Tacoma, Washington, U.S.	
13	Loss	11–2	Al Seeger	UD	8	2004-09-16	Kewadin Casino, Sault Ste. Marie, Michigan, U.S.	
12	Win	11–1	Terrance Roy	UD	6	2004-05-27	Lincoln Theatre, Washington, D.C., U.S.	
11	Win	10–1	Antonio Garris	KO	1 (8), 1:02	2004-02-28	Convention Center, Washington, D.C., U.S.	
10	Win	9–1	Agnaldo Nunes	UD	6	2003-12-13	Convention Center, Washington, D.C., U.S.	
9	Win	8–1	Travis Gregory	KO	1 (4)	2003-08-09	Convention Center, Washington, D.C., U.S.	
8	Win	7–1	Richard Dinkins	TKO	1 (4)	2003-05-10	D.C. Armory, Washington, D.C., U.S.	
7	Win	6–1	César García	KO	2 (4), 0:24	2003-04-12	Emerald Queen Casino, Tacoma, Washington, U.S.	
6	Win	5–1	Ubaldo Olivencia	KO	3 (4)	2003-03-15	D.C. Armory, Washington, D.C., U.S.	
5	Win	4–1	Edward Anderson	TKO	4 (4), 2:15	2002-06-15	DC Tunnel, Washington, D.C., U.S.	
4	Win	3–1	Angelo Torres	KO	1 (4), 2:08	2002-06-01	Tacoma Dome, Tacoma, Washington, U.S.	
3	Win	2–1	Angelo Torres	UD	4	2001-11-10	Emerald Queen Casino, Tacoma, Washington, U.S.	
2	Loss	1–1	Antonio Oliveros	UD	4	2001-06-16	Murray Skating Center, Yonkers, New York, U.S.	
1	Win	1–0	Jhovany Collado	TKO	3 (4)	2001-01-12	Sands Casino, Atlantic City, New Jersey, U.S.	

== See also ==
- List of world featherweight boxing champions

Sporting positions
Regional boxing titles
Vacant Title last held by Alvin Brown	NABA featherweight champion January 20, 2006 – May 13, 2006; Won world title	Vacant Title next held by Johnnie Edwards
World boxing titles
Preceded by Valdemir Pereira	IBF featherweight champion May 13, 2006 – September 2, 2006	Succeeded by Robert Guerrero
