= Robert Guerrero =

American boxer (born 1983)

Personal information
- Nickname: The Ghost
- Born: Robert Joseph Guerrero; March 27, 1983 (age 43) Gilroy, California, U.S.
- Height: 5 ft 8 in (173 cm)
- Weight: Featherweight; Super featherweight; Lightweight; Welterweight

Boxing career
- Reach: 70 in (178 cm)
- Stance: Southpaw

Boxing record
- Total fights: 47
- Wins: 38
- Win by KO: 20
- Losses: 6
- Draws: 1
- No contests: 2

Robert Joseph Guerrero (born March 27, 1983) is an American professional boxer. He has held world championships in two weight classes, including the IBF featherweight title twice between 2006 and 2008, and the IBF junior lightweight title from 2009 to 2010.

== Professional career ==
=== Featherweight ===
==== Early career ====
Guerrero is trained by his father Ruben Guerrero, a former amateur champion, who introduced Robert and his five brothers to boxing as youngsters growing up in Gilroy, California. After an impressive amateur career begun at a very young age, Robert turned professional, at the age of 18, on May 22, 2001 with a four-round unanimous decision win against Alejandro Cruz. After several wins and only a single draw later, Guerrero won the WBC NABF Featherweight title against Cesar Figueroa on December 9, 2004. Defending his NABF title twice, Guerrero was seen as a rising prospect, until meeting Gamaliel Diaz in a bout televised on ShoBox, on the Showtime channel, on December 12, 2005. An aggressive Diaz upset Guerrero, winning by split decision and taking the NABF belt in the process.

Guerrero rebounded from his first loss by defeating Sandros Marcos via third-round technical knock-out, setting up a rematch against Diaz, again on Showtime. Guerrero knocked down Diaz in the first round, and eventually knocking out Diaz early in the sixth round. The win set him up to face IBF champion Eric Aiken.

==== Featherweight title ====
In his first world championship fight on September 2, 2006, Guerrero defeated Eric Aiken by an eighth-round technical knockout in Los Angeles. Guerrero used inside fighting, neutralizing Aiken's power, and eventually making Aiken quit on his stool after the eighth round to earn his first world title belt.

==== Guerrero vs. Salido ====
Guerrero lost the belt in his next fight in a mandatory defense to Orlando Salido in Las Vegas. Salido dominated the majority of the bout and pulled off an upset decision win with scores of 115–113, 117–111, 118–110. However, Salido would subsequently be stripped of the IBF title after testing positive for steroids, thus vacating the belt; the result of the bout would also be changed to a twelve-round no decision by the Nevada State Athletic Commission.

The IBF subsequently gave Guerrero the shot at the vacant featherweight title, which he won by ninth-round technical knockout in Copenhagen, Denmark on February 23, 2007, against Albanian boxer Spend Abazi.

Guerrero's second defense of his second title was to be against Rocky Juarez (27–3, 19 KOs); however, Juarez chose to meet WBC Super Featherweight Champion Juan Manuel Márquez in a money fight instead. Guerrero's first defense was scheduled to be against Martin Honorio (24–3–1) on November 3, 2007, and was televised on Showtime, on the undercard of the Marquez-Juarez match. Guerrero was unable to attend the final press conference before the match after his wife Casey was diagnosed with leukemia. Guerrero defeated Honorio in a first round knock-out.

On February 29, 2008, Guerrero defeated Jason Litzau via an eighth round knock out. Guerrero then vacated the title to move up in weight.

=== Super featherweight ===
==== Guerrero vs. Yordan ====
On March 7, 2009, Guerrero fought Daud Yordan in his HBO debut. The fight ended in a second round "no contest" decision after Guerrero suffered a headbutt resulting in a gash above his eye. After the bout Guerrero offered Yordan a rematch, however, Yordan reportedly declined.

==== Guerrero vs. Hinojosa ====
On June 12, 2009, Guerrero faced Efren Hinojosa (30–5–1). He suffered another deep cut near his left eye from a head-butt in the seventh round, but this time it did not slow his progress as he scored an eighth round TKO victory. After the bout, the media described him as having redeemed himself for his previous lackluster effort.

==== Guerrero vs. Klassen ====
On August 22, 2009, Guerrero challenged Malcolm Klassen for his IBF Super Featherweight title. Guerrero won the fight by a unanimous decision to claim the world title. The scores were 117–112, 116–112 and 115–113 in his favor.

In February 2010, Guerrero vacated his Featherweight title in order to care for his ailing wife.

=== Lightweight ===
==== Guererro vs. Arrieta ====
On April 30, 2010, Guerrero moved up to the lightweight division to fight Robert Arrieta (35–15–4). The bout took place at the Tropicana Hotel and Casino in Las Vegas, Nevada, United States. Guerrero won the fight by TKO in the 8th round.

After the bout, Guerrero expressed his interest in fighting Mexican champion Juan Manuel Márquez.

=== Light welterweight ===
==== Guerrero vs. Casamayor ====
On July 31, 2010, Guerrero moved up to the junior welterweight division and faced Cuban fighter Joel Casamayor on the undercard of the Marquez vs. Diaz pay-per-view at the Mandalay Bay in Las Vegas. Guerrero defeated Casamayor by a 10-round unanimous decision.

=== Return to lightweight ===
==== Guerrero vs. Escobedo ====
On November 6, 2010, he faced Vicente Escobedo for the vacant WBO Inter-Continental lightweight title. Guerrero knocked Escobedo down in the third and sixth rounds en route to a ten-round unanimous decision.

==== Guerrero vs. Katsidis ====
On April 9, 2011, Guerrero faced Michael Katsidis for the interim WBA and WBO lightweight titles. Guerrero won the bout with a 12-round unanimous decision. In a post-fight interview when asked about his hometown he said, "It's nice when you're pretty much their biggest thing besides garlic in Gilroy." Guerrero was scheduled to face Marcos Maidana in August for the WBA junior welterweight title, however, he was forced to pull out of the bout after suffering a torn tendon in his rotator cuff. He underwent surgery to repair the injury and was out of the ring for 6 months.

=== Welterweight ===
==== Guerrero vs. Aydin ====
Guerrero returned to the ring by jumping two weight classes to face unbeaten top 10 welterweight Selcuk Aydin. On July 28, 2012 Guerrero defeated Aydin in San Jose, California by unanimous decision for the interim WBC welterweight title.

==== Guerrero vs. Berto ====
Guerrero's next fight was against former two-time Welterweight champion Andre Berto (28–1, 22 KO) at the Citizens Bank Business Arena in Ontario, California. Guerrero started off the fight fast, sending Berto to the canvas each of the first two rounds, as well as badly closing Berto's right eye early on. Berto got back into the fight during the middle rounds, landing hard uppercuts and right hands on Guerrero, who took the punches well. Throughout the fight the two traded punches with Berto on the ropes and Guerrero smothering him, while out working him the majority of the time. By the end of the fight, both of Berto's eyes and Guerrero's right eye were closed shut. Guerrero won a unanimous decision by the scores of 116–110 on all three scorecards. Guerrero had a purse of $1 million, while Berto's purse was $1.625 million. In the post fight interview, Guerrero called out pound-for-pound champion Floyd Mayweather saying, "Pretty Boy, let's do it."

==== Guerrero vs. Mayweather ====
On May 4, 2013 in a fight billed as May Day', Guerrero lost to Floyd Mayweather Jr. (43–0, 26 KOs) in the WBC Welterweight Championship fight by a unanimous decision in front of a 15,880 crowd at the MGM Grand arena, with all judges scoring the fight 117–111 in favor of Mayweather. Guerrero won the first 3 rounds, then Mayweather adjusted back to his defensive style and won from the 4th to 12th round. Mayweather landing a high 60 percent of his power punches, which included 23 of 30 power punches in the eighth round, when Guerrero was cut over his left eye. Throughout the fight, Mayweather landed 195 punches to 113 for Guerrero. Guerrero reportedly earned a career high of $3 million and the fight exceeded 1 million PPV buys.

==== Guerrero vs. Kamegai ====
Guerrero took off a full year before returning to the ring on June 21, 2014 to fight Japanese boxer Yoshihiro Kamegai. Guererro could hardly open his left eye toward the end of the fight, but scored a unanimous 12-round decision over the tough Kamegai with official scores of 116–112, 117–111, and 117–111, thereby marking a triumphant return to the ring.

==== Guerrero vs. Thurman ====
On March 7, Guerrero fought in NBC's first episode of their new series, "Premier Boxing Champions" at the MGM Grand in Las Vegas. Guerrero's opponent was undefeated Keith Thurman. Thurman started off the match as the aggressor, throwing many powerful punches. Guerrero was able to withstand Thurman's blows until he was knocked down in the ninth round. Although the fight seemed bleak for Guerrero he was able to fight back, giving an exciting final three rounds in which he became the aggressor and forced Thurman against the ropes. Ultimately, "The Ghost" lost by unanimous decision but Guerrero's determination and strong will to win had the crowd of the MGM Grand chanting his name for the majority of the final round.

==== Guerrero vs. Martinez ====
On June 6, 2015 Guerrero fought again on NBC as part of the "Premier Boxing Champions" series at StubHub Center, California, against the gritty Aron Martinez (19–4–1, 4 KOs). Martinez proved himself to be an underdog with bite. The action got going in earnest in Round 2, with both fighters working the body hard in some grueling infighting. Martinez continued to press the action in Round 4, scoring a knockdown at the end with hard body shots and then combinations to the head. But the momentum of the fight began to swing back in Guerrero's direction in Round 6, when he fought more from the outside. Both fighters had their moments in the latter half of the fight, but it was Guerrero who was able to control the distance, outland Martinez and pull out a split-decision win in a feisty back-and-forth battle.

==== Guerrero vs. Garcia ====
On January 23, 2016 Guerrero fought on FOX as part of the "Premier Boxing Champions" series at Staples Center, California, against the undefeated Danny Garcia (31–0–0, 18 KO) for the vacant WBC Welterweight Championship. The match was ruled a unanimous decision in favor of Garcia with all three judges scoring the bout 116–112, despite fighting on near-equal terms. Guerrero started off impressive, but became less effective late in the fight falling to a 3rd career defeat in a welterweight title fight. Garcia landed 163 of 496 thrown (33%), whilst Guerrero landed 108 of 436 punches thrown (25%).

==== Guerrero vs. Peralta ====
Guerrero's next fight was announced on July 16, to take place at the Honda Center in Anaheim against Argentine boxer David Emanuel Peralta (25–2–1, 14 KOs) on August 27. Guerrero was outboxed, outclassed and beaten by Peralta. The judges decided after 12 rounds Peralta won by split decision, handing Guerrero his 4th loss in his last six fights.

==== Guerrero vs. Figueroa Jr. ====
On May 23, 2017 it was announced that Guerrero would fight at the renovated Nassau Coliseum in Uniondale, New York against undefeated former WBC lightweight champion Omar Figueroa Jr. (26–0–1, 18 KOs) on July 15, 2017. The bout will take place as part of a triple header main event which would include Sean Monaghan vs. Marcus Browne. Before this fight, Figueroa last fought in December 2015. The first boxing event to take place at the Coliseum in 31 years saw Guerrero stopped in the third round in front of a crowd of 7,492. Figueroa dropped Guerrero a total five times before the fight was halted. According to Compubox stats, Figueroa landed 88 of his 185 punches thrown (48%), whilst Guerrero landed 78 of 201 thrown (39%). Guerrero saw success in round 1, but the fight turned around when Figueroa landed a huge left hook knocking Guerrero down and eventually handing him his third consecutive loss. According to Nielsen Media, the fight peaked at 1,039,000 viewers on Fox. The whole show averaged 886,000 viewers.

=== Retirement ===
A couple of days following his first stoppage loss, Guerrero announced his retirement from professional boxing after 16 years. Guerrero had been on a decline, since losing to Floyd Mayweather in 2013. He had only won two of his last six fights. Guerrero said in a statement,

"First, I want to thank God for allowing me to have a wonderful career. I'm a kid from a small town in Gilroy, California, who made it to the mountain top of the boxing world. When I was a young kid growing up, I always believed in myself, but never in my wildest dreams would I have imagined a small-town kid like myself, would be fighting in front of millions of fans." "I was blessed to win multiple world titles in four-divisions. A boxer's career is a long and tough road. Many tears were shed, lots of blood, and tons of sweat. Many miles were traveled, thousands of rounds sparred, none were easy and nothing was ever given to me. I earned everything I got the old fashion way. I never ducked anyone and fought the best fighters in the world. I fought my way through every obstacle to make sure my fans enjoyed every second, of every round, of my fights."

In the statement, he also thanked advisor Al Haymon and praised him as "the most special man" he ever met in his boxing career. He ended his career with 33 wins out of 42 fights, including 18 wins coming inside the distance.

=== Comeback ===
==== Guerrero vs. Mate ====
On November 8, 2018 Guerrero surprisingly announced he would be returning to the boxing ring, stating he had 'some fight left' and also wanting to further his legacy. According to ESPN, his return bout would take place on December 1 on the Wilder vs. Fury Showtime PPV card at the Staples Center in Los Angeles, California. Guerrero was scheduled to fight 27-year-old Hungarian boxer Adam Mate (28–12, 21 KOs) in a 10-round welterweight bout. For the comeback, Guerrero was guaranteed a $25,000 purse. Fighting for the first time in 16 months, Guerrero knocked out Mate in round 2 of their scheduled 8 round bout. Mate was knocked down once in round 1, taking a knee and twice in round 2. After beating the count for the second knockdown, referee Ray Corona stopped the fight. It was Guerrero's first stoppage win in 13 fights, dating back to April 2010.

==== Guerrero vs. Herrera ====
In his next fight, Guerrero defeated Hevinson Herera via a fifth round technical knockout.

==== Guerrero vs. Thomas ====
In his following fight, Guerrero fought Gerald Thomas. Guerrero won the fight via unanimous decision, scoring 99–91, 99–91 and 98–92 on the scorecards.

==== Guerrero vs. Ortiz ====
On August 21, 2021, Guerrero faced former world champion Victor Ortiz. In a fight that lacked action at times, all three judges uniformly saw Guerrero as the narrow winner, with all of them scoring it 96–94 in favor of Guerrero.

== Professional boxing record ==
47 fights	38 wins	6 losses
By knockout	20	1
By decision	18	5
Draws	1	
No contests	2	

No.	Result	Record	Opponent	Type	Round, time	Date	Location	Notes
47	Win	38–6–1 (2)	Andre Berto	UD	10	Dec 16, 2023	Minneapolis Armory, Minneapolis, Minnesota, U.S.	
46	Win	37–6–1 (2)	Victor Ortiz	UD	10	Aug 21, 2021	T-Mobile Arena, Paradise, Nevada, U.S.	
45	Win	36–6–1 (2)	Gerald Thomas	UD	10	Sep 28, 2019	Staples Center, Los Angeles, California, U.S.	
44	Win	35–6–1 (2)	Hevinson Herrera	RTD	5 (10), 3:00	Mar 9, 2019	Dignity Health Sports Park, Carson, California, U.S.	
43	Win	34–6–1 (2)	Adam Mate	KO	2 (8), 2:25	Dec 1, 2018	Staples Center, Los Angeles, California, U.S.	
42	Loss	33–6–1 (2)	Omar Figueroa Jr.	TKO	3 (12), 1:30	Jul 15, 2017	Nassau Coliseum, Uniondale, New York, U.S.	
41	Loss	33–5–1 (2)	David Emanuel Peralta	SD	12	Aug 27, 2016	Honda Center, Anaheim, California, U.S.	
40	Loss	33–4–1 (2)	Danny García	UD	12	Jan 23, 2016	Staples Center, Los Angeles, California, U.S.	For vacant WBC welterweight title
39	Win	33–3–1 (2)	Aaron Martinez	SD	10	Jun 6, 2015	StubHub Center, Carson, California, U.S.	
38	Loss	32–3–1 (2)	Keith Thurman	UD	12	Mar 7, 2015	MGM Grand Garden Arena, Paradise, Nevada, U.S.	For WBA welterweight title
37	Win	32–2–1 (2)	Yoshihiro Kamegai	UD	12	Jun 21, 2014	StubHub Center, Carson, California, U.S.	
36	Loss	31–2–1 (2)	Floyd Mayweather Jr.	UD	12	May 4, 2013	MGM Grand Garden Arena, Paradise, Nevada, U.S.	For WBC and vacant The Ring welterweight titles
35	Win	31–1–1 (2)	Andre Berto	UD	12	Nov 24, 2012	Citizens Business Bank Arena, Ontario, California, U.S.	Retained WBC interim welterweight title
34	Win	30–1–1 (2)	Selçuk Aydın	UD	12	Jul 28, 2012	HP Pavilion, San Jose, California, U.S.	Won vacant WBC interim welterweight title
33	Win	29–1–1 (2)	Michael Katsidis	UD	12	Apr 9, 2011	MGM Grand Garden Arena, Paradise, Nevada, U.S.	Won vacant WBA interim and WBO interim lightweight titles
32	Win	28–1–1 (2)	Vicente Escobedo	UD	10	Nov 6, 2010	Prudential Center, Newark, New Jersey, U.S.	Won WBO Inter-Continental lightweight title
31	Win	27–1–1 (2)	Joel Casamayor	UD	10	Jul 31, 2010	Mandalay Bay Events Center, Paradise, Nevada, U.S.	
30	Win	26–1–1 (2)	Roberto David Arrieta	TKO	8 (10), 0:29	Apr 30, 2010	Tropicana Las Vegas, Paradise, Nevada, U.S.	
29	Win	25–1–1 (2)	Malcolm Klassen	UD	12	Aug 22, 2009	Toyota Center, Houston, Texas, U.S.	Won IBF junior lightweight title
28	Win	24–1–1 (2)	Efren Hinojosa	RTD	8 (10), 3:00	Jun 12, 2009	HP Pavilion, San Jose, California, U.S.	
27	NC	23–1–1 (2)	Daud Yordan	NC	2 (10), 1:47	Mar 7, 2009	HP Pavilion, San Jose, California, U.S.	Vacant NABO junior lightweight title at stake; Guerrero unable to continue after an accidental head clash
26	Win	23–1–1 (1)	Edel Ruiz	TKO	1 (10), 0:43	Jan 24, 2009	Staples Center, Los Angeles, California, U.S.	
25	Win	22–1–1 (1)	Jason Litzau	KO	8 (12), 2:25	Feb 29, 2008	Tachi Palace Hotel & Casino, Lemoore, California, U.S.	Retained IBF featherweight title
24	Win	21–1–1 (1)	Martin Honorio	TKO	1 (12), 0:56	Nov 3, 2007	Desert Diamond Casino, Tucson, Arizona, U.S.	Retained IBF featherweight title
23	Win	20–1–1 (1)	Spend Abazi	TKO	9 (12), 0:01	Feb 23, 2007	Falkoner Center, Copenhagen, Denmark	Won vacant IBF featherweight title
22	NC	19–1–1 (1)	Orlando Salido	UD	12	Nov 4, 2006	Mandalay Bay Events Center, Paradise, Nevada, U.S.	IBF featherweight title at stake; Originally UD win for Salido, later ruled NC after he failed a drug test
21	Win	19–1–1	Eric Aiken	RTD	8 (12), 3:00	Sep 2, 2006	Staples Center, Los Angeles, California, U.S.	Won IBF featherweight title
20	Win	18–1–1	Gamaliel Díaz	KO	6 (12), 2:33	Jun 23, 2006	Oakland Arena, Oakland, California, U.S.	Won NABF featherweight title
19	Win	17–1–1	Sandro Marcos	TKO	3 (10), 0:54	May 18, 2006	HP Pavilion, San Jose, California, U.S.	
18	Loss	16–1–1	Gamaliel Díaz	SD	12	Dec 2, 2005	Palace Indian Gaming Center, Lemoore, California, U.S.	Lost NABF featherweight title
17	Win	16–0–1	Sammy Ventura	KO	1 (12), 2:05	Sep 16, 2005	Palace Indian Gaming Center, Lemoore, California, U.S.	Retained NABF featherweight title
16	Win	15–0–1	Adrian Valdez	TKO	12	Apr 1, 2005	Palace Indian Gaming Center, Lemoore, California, U.S.	Retained NABF featherweight title
15	Win	14–0–1	Cesar Figueroa	KO	4 (12), 0:59	Dec 9, 2004	Pechanga Resort & Casino, Temecula, California, U.S.	Won NABF featherweight title
14	Win	13–0–1	Enrique Sanchez	TKO	8 (10)	Jun 3, 2004	Chinook Winds Casino, Lincoln City, Oregon, U.S.	
13	Win	12–0–1	Juan Polo Perez	TKO	2 (6)	Apr 24, 2004	Miccosukee Resort & Gaming, Miami, Florida, U.S.	
12	Draw	11–0–1	Julian Rodriguez	TD	1 (8), 1:17	Mar 14, 2004	Pechanga Resort & Casino, Temecula, California, U.S.	Rodriguez unable to continue after an accidental foul
11	Win	11–0	Jose Luis Tula	TKO	1 (10), 2:30	Jun 8, 2003	Texas Station, North Las Vegas, Nevada, U.S.	
10	Win	10–0	David Vasquez	TKO	1 (10), 1:02	May 4, 2003	Spotlight 29 Casino, Coachella, California, U.S.	
9	Win	9–0	Jose Alfonso Rodriguez	TKO	2 (6), 2:38	Dec 20, 2002	American Airlines Arena, Miami, Florida, U.S.	
8	Win	8–0	Freddy Castro	UD	6	Jul 3, 2002	Hyatt Hotel, Monterey, California, U.S.	
7	Win	7–0	Marcos Badillo	UD	6	Apr 14, 2002	The Joint, Paradise, Nevada, U.S.	
6	Win	6–0	Robert Enriquez	UD	4	Mar 10, 2002	Green Valley Ranch, Henderson, Nevada, U.S.	
5	Win	5–0	Joaquin Candelario	UD	4	Feb 8, 2002	Pechanga Resort & Casino, Temecula, California, U.S.	
4	Win	4–0	Arthur Trevino	UD	4	Jan 25, 2002	Young Pavilion, Pembroke Pines, Florida, U.S.	
3	Win	3–0	Oscar Rosales	UD	4	Nov 2, 2001	Sunset Station, San Antonio, Texas, U.S.	
2	Win	2–0	Javier Gonzalez	TKO	3 (4)	Sep 29, 2001	Miccosukee Resort & Gaming, Miami, Florida, U.S.	
1	Win	1–0	Alejandro Cruz	UD	4	Apr 22, 2001	Fantasy Springs Resort Casino, Indio, California, U.S.	

== Titles in boxing ==
=== Major world titles ===
- IBF featherweight champion (126 lbs) (2x)
- IBF junior lightweight champion (130 lbs)

=== Interim world titles ===
- WBA interim lightweight champion (135 lbs)
- WBO interim lightweight champion (135 lbs)
- WBC interim welterweight champion (147 lbs)

=== Regional/International titles ===
- NABF featherweight champion (126 lbs) (2x)
- WBO Inter-Continental lightweight champion (135 lbs)

== Pay-per-view bouts ==
Date	Fight	Billing	Buys	Network	Revenue
May 4, 2013	Mayweather vs. Guerrero	May Day	1,000,000	Showtime	$60,000,000

== Filmography ==
Year	Title	Role	Notes
2010	The Ghost	Himself	Directed by Andrew Johnston, in association with Golden Boy Promotions

Sporting positions
Regional boxing titles
Preceded by César Figueroa	WBC–NABF featherweight champion December 9, 2004 – December 2, 2005	Succeeded by Gamaliel Díaz
Preceded by Gamaliel Díaz	WBC–NABF featherweight champion June 23 – September 2, 2006; Won IBF title	Vacant Title next held by Juan Ruiz
Vacant Title last held by Kevin Mitchell	WBO Inter-Continental lightweight champion November 6, 2010 – April 9, 2011; Won interim world title	Vacant Title next held by Kevin Mitchell
World boxing titles
Preceded by Eric Aiken	IBF featherweight champion September 2, 2006 – November 4, 2006; Succeeded by Orlando Salido; vacant after NC	Vacant Title next held by Himself
Vacant Title last held by Himself	IBF featherweight champion February 23, 2007 – June 23, 2008; Vacated	Vacant Title next held by Cristóbal Cruz
Preceded by Malcolm Klassen	IBF junior lightweight champion August 22, 2009 – February 16, 2010; Vacated	Vacant Title next held by Mzonke Fana
Vacant Title last held by Miguel Acosta	WBA lightweight champion Interim title April 9, 2011 – August 29, 2011; Vacated	Vacant Title next held by Richar Abril
Vacant Title last held by Michael Katsidis	WBO lightweight champion Interim title April 9, 2011 – September 1, 2011; Vacated	Vacant Title next held by Ricky Burns
Vacant Title last held by Shane Mosley	WBC welterweight champion Interim title July 28, 2012 – May 4, 2013; Lost bid for full title	Vacant
