= Lennox Lewis vs. Hasim Rahman =

Boxing competition

Thunder in Africa
- Date: 22 April 2001
- Venue: Carnival City Casino, Brakpan, South Africa
- Title(s) on the line: WBC, IBF, and IBO heavyweight titles

Tale of the tape
| Boxer | Lennox Lewis | Hasim Rahman |
| Nickname | The Lion | The Rock |
| Hometown | London, England | Baltimore, Maryland, U.S. |
| Purse | $7,000,000 | $1,500,000 |
| Pre-fight record | 38–1–1 (29 KO) | 34–2 (28 KO) |
| Age | 35 years, 7 months | 28 years, 5 months |
| Height | 6 ft 5 in (196 cm) | 6 ft 2 1/2 in (189 cm) |
| Weight | 253 1/2 lb (115 kg) | 238 lb (108 kg) |
| Style | Orthodox | Orthodox |
| Recognition | WBC, IBF, and IBO; Heavyweight Champion | IBF; No 2 Ranked Heavyweight; WBC; No. 10 ranked heavyweight |

Result
- Rahman wins via 5th-round knockout

Lennox Lewis vs. Hasim Rahman, billed as Thunder in Africa, was a heavyweight professional boxing match contested between unified WBC, IBF, IBO, and lineal champion Lennox Lewis, and Hasim Rahman. The bout took place on 22 April 2001 in Brakpan, South Africa. Rahman, who was a 20–1 underdog, won by knockout in the fifth round. It was one of the biggest upsets in boxing history.

== Background ==
Following three successful title defenses in 2000, Lennox Lewis turned his sights on a potential superfight with Mike Tyson. Lewis had originally hoped to meet Tyson during the summer of 2001, however, Tyson was issued a three-month suspension early in the year after testing positive for marijuana following his 2000 fight with Andrew Golota. Lewis opted to make his next defense against little-known Hasim Rahman. Lewis came into the fight as a 20–1 favorite and paid little attention to his opponent, having begun negotiations for his long-awaited match with Tyson while also being challenged to a possible unification match by WBA heavyweight champion John Ruiz. Brakpan, Gauteng, South Africa, is 5,200 feet above sea level. Rahman arrived on 27 March so he would have time to adjust to the high altitude, but Lewis didn't arrive until 10 April. Lewis trained in Las Vegas, Nevada, which is 2,000 feet above sea level. He trained in Las Vegas so he could also film scenes for a cameo appearance in the movie Ocean's Eleven. Notwithstanding the altitude challenges, the actual fight itself took place at an odd time, 05:00 (SAST) on Sunday 22 April 2001 in order to accommodate HBO's significant United States-based audience at a reasonable hour on Saturday 21 April 2001. After Lewis was knocked out by Rahman, HBO commentator Larry Merchant said, "He just drowned in Ocean's Eleven."

== The fight ==
The two fighters fought a close first four rounds, though Lewis was ahead on all three judges' scorecards by the score of 39–37, having won rounds two through four while Rahman was able to win the fight's opening round. By the fourth round, Rahman had become the aggressor, throwing 60 punches to Lewis' 33, though each man landed 20 and Lewis was able to narrowly win the round. In the fifth round, Lewis threw few punches, instead stalking Rahman throughout the round in an attempt to size up Rahman in order to land a knockout blow, but Rahman was able to successfully defend himself and avoided taking any power punches from Lewis. With 46 seconds remaining in the round, Rahman was able to turn the tables and used his jab to back Lewis into the ropes. Shortly after that exchange, Lewis momentarily dropped his gloves to his side, allowing Rahman to quickly land a strong right hand that dropped Lewis to the mat. Lewis was unable to get back to his feet and Rahman was announced the winner by knockout, becoming the new heavyweight champion.

== Aftermath ==
Following his upset victory, Rahman became an overnight sensation. Less than a month after his victory, Rahman signed a $5 million deal with influential promoter Don King. Shortly before joining King's stable, cable giants HBO and Showtime entered into negotiations with Rahman in an attempt to get exclusive rights to air his fights. Showtime offered Rahman an estimated $19.25 million to sign with them and face their premier fighter Mike Tyson in the first defense of his newly won titles, while HBO offered Rahman $17 million to instead face Lewis in a rematch, but Rahman turned down both offers and instead agreed to a match with Danish fighter Brian Nielsen that would earn him an additional $5 million. The Rahman–Nielsen fight fell through, however, and it was announced in June that Rahman would defend his titles against David Izon. Lewis, however, had a rematch clause in his contract and went to court in hopes of gaining his rematch with Rahman and in June, a judge ruled in Lewis' favor, giving him the legal right to face Rahman for the titles. In August, both sides were able to reach an agreement and the rematch was announced for 17 November 2001 in Las Vegas. Lewis avenged the defeat, regaining the heavyweight titles via fourth-round knockout.

Despite airing at 3.15am on Sunday morning, 1.4 million viewers tuned in on BBC One.

== Undercard ==
Confirmed bouts:

== Broadcasting ==
| Country | Broadcaster |
|---|---|
| Australia | Main Event |
| Canada | The Movie Network |
| Japan | J Sports |
| Mexico | Televisa |
| Philippines | IBC |
| United Kingdom | BBC |
| United States | HBO |

| Preceded by vs. David Tua | Lennox Lewis' bouts 22 April 2001 | Succeeded by Rematch |
| Preceded by vs. Frankie Swindell | Hasim Rahman's bouts 22 April 2001 | Succeeded by Rematch |
Awards
| Previous: Stevie Johnston vs. José Luis Castillo | The Ring Magazine Upset of the Year; 2001 | Next: Francisco Bojado vs. Juan Carlos Rubio |
