= Gary Miller (sportscaster) =

American sportscaster and radio host

Gary Miller (born 1956 or 1957) is an American sportscaster and radio host, best known for his tenure at ESPN from 1990 to 2004.

== Early life and education ==
Miller is a native of Naperville, Illinois and a graduate of Southern Illinois University.

== Career ==
=== WSAV-TV, CNN and Headline News ===
From 1978–82, he was the Sports Director at WSAV-TV in Savannah, Georgia. Before Miller came to ESPN, he spent eight years at CNN and Headline News as part of their sports coverage.

=== ESPN ===
From 1990 to 2004, Miller worked at ESPN. He was an anchor at SportsCenter, the host of ESPN's Baseball Tonight, and the last host of the sports interview show Up Close before it was canceled in 2001. Miller also occasionally did play-by-play of Major League Baseball games, and was the primary dugout reporter on Monday Night baseball broadcasts, as well as ESPN DayGame. Other play-by-play assignments during this period included games of the College World Series and the Little League World Series.

=== West Coast Bias ===
Until November 2006, he was host of West Coast Bias, a daily sports talk show on KSPN radio in Los Angeles, along with former National Football League athlete D'Marco Farr. The show, which airs at 1 p.m. Pacific time Monday through Friday, sometimes originates at ESPN Zone in Anaheim, California. On November 10, 2006, it was reported that Miller was leaving the show, effective immediately. The program was renamed The D'Marco Farr Show with guest hosts replacing Miller.

=== KCBS, KCAL, and WKRC ===
Miller was a weekend sports anchor for the CBS Corporation-owned duopoly of KCBS and KCAL in Los Angeles until January 2017. In August 2017, Miller joined Cincinnati's local CBS station WKRC as weeknight sports anchor.

== Personal life ==
In 1997, Miller was arrested for public indecency at a nightclub in Cleveland, where he covered that year's American League Championship Series. Police confiscated what was described as "drug paraphernalia" and said Miller was seen urinating out of an upstairs window. Miller stated he was urinating in a bottle when he accidentally urinated on an off-duty police officer. He was fined and sentenced to community service.
