= Valdemir Pereira =

Brazilian boxer

Personal information
- Nickname: Sertão
- Born: Valdemir dos Santos Pereira; November 15, 1974 (age 51) Cruz das Almas, Bahia, Brazil
- Height: 5 ft 5 in (165 cm)
- Weight: Featherweight

Boxing career
- Stance: Orthodox

Boxing record
- Total fights: 25
- Wins: 24
- Win by KO: 15
- Losses: 1

Valdemir dos Santos Pereira (born November 15, 1974, in Cruz das Almas, Bahia) is a Brazilian former professional boxer who competed from 2001 to 2006 and held the IBF featherweight title in 2006. As an amateur Pereira represented Brazil at the 2000 Olympics, reaching the round of 16 of the featherweight bracket.

== Amateur career ==
As an amateur, Pereira fought as a Featherweight for the Brazilian Olympic Team at the 2000 Summer Olympics in Sydney:

- Defeated James Swan (Australia)
- Lost to Ramazan Palyani (Turkey)

== Professional career ==
Known as "Sertão", Pereira turned pro in 2001 and won the vacant IBF Featherweight Title with a decision victory over Fahprakorb Rakkiatgym in January 2006. He lost the title in his first defense, via disqualification against Eric Aiken later that year, due to excessive low blows. A rematch was scheduled but never materialized. He is now living at Cruz das Almas, Bahia, Brazil.

== Professional boxing record ==
25 fights	24 wins	1 loss
By knockout	15	0
By decision	9	0
By disqualification	0	1

No.	Result	Record	Opponent	Type	Round, time	Date	Location	Notes
25	Loss	24–1	Eric Aiken	DQ	8 (12), 1:37	13 May 2006	TD Garden, Boston, Massachusetts, U.S.	Lost IBF featherweight title; Pereira disqualified for repeated low blows
24	Win	24–0	Yuri Romanovich	UD	10	9 Apr 2006	IMES, São Caetano do Sul, Brazil	
23	Win	23–0	Fahprakorb Rakkiatgym	UD	12	20 Jan 2006	Foxwoods Resort Casino, Ledyard, Connecticut, U.S.	Won vacant IBF featherweight title
22	Win	22–0	Victor Hugo Paz	UD	10	23 Jul 2005	Gimnasio Municipal, Embu das Artes, Brazil	
21	Win	21–0	Euclides Espitia	TKO	3 (8)	28 May 2005	Ginasio Alves Cabral, Vitória, Brazil	
20	Win	20–0	Whyber Garcia	UD	12	28 Jan 2005	Northern Quest Resort, Airway Heights, Washington, U.S.	Retained WBA Fedelatin featherweight title
19	Win	19–0	Pastor Humberto Maurin	UD	12	11 Dec 2004	Ginasio Municipal, Ibirapuera, Brazil	Won vacant WBA Fedelatin featherweight title
18	Win	18–0	Emmanuel Lucero	SD	10	13 Aug 2004	Pechanga Resort & Casino, Temecula, California, U.S.	
17	Win	17–0	Julio Cesar Alganaraz	RTD	4 (8), 3:00	1 May 2004	Ginasio Municipal Ayrton Senna, Carapicuíba, Brazil	
16	Win	16–0	Rogers Mtagwa	TKO	8 (10), 2:36	3 Jan 2004	Foxwoods Resort Casino, Ledyard, Connecticut, U.S.	
15	Win	15–0	Luis Enrique Adame	UD	10	9 Aug 2003	Miami Arena, Miami, Florida, U.S.	
14	Win	14–0	Oney Hellems	TKO	2 (10), 2:59	15 Mar 2003	UIC Pavilion, Chicago, Illinois, U.S.	
13	Win	13–0	Ronaldo Lima	TKO	2 (?)	16 Feb 2003	Estudio Rede Bandeirantes TV, São Paulo, Brazil	
12	Win	12–0	Marcos Badillo	UD	6	13 Dec 2002	Pechanga Resort & Casino, Temecula, California, U.S.	
11	Win	11–0	Jose Claudio Da Silva	KO	4 (6)	24 Aug 2002	Municipal Arena, Jandira, Brazil	
10	Win	10–0	Robert Enriquez	TKO	4 (6), 1:29	3 Aug 2002	Dodge Theater, Phoenix, Arizona, U.S.	
9	Win	9–0	Cirilo Coronel Campos	TKO	2 (6)	18 May 2002	CESPRO, São Caetano do Sul, Brazil	
8	Win	8–0	Sergio Gustavo Rodriguez	KO	2 (8)	23 Mar 2002	Milton Feijao Arena, São Caetano do Sul, Brazil	
7	Win	7–0	Almir Fernandes de Oliveira	KO	1 (10)	26 Feb 2002	Ginasio Baby Barione, São Paulo, Brazil	
6	Win	6–0	Gutemberg Ferreira	PTS	6	21 Dec 2001	CESPRO, São Caetano do Sul, Brazil	
5	Win	5–0	Sebastiao Macaris	TKO	2 (4)	17 Nov 2001	Municipal Arena, Diadema, Brazil	
4	Win	4–0	Julio Cesar Soares	KO	2 (?)	21 Sep 2001	Leonard's Restaurant, São Caetano do Sul, Brazil	
3	Win	3–0	Renato Pedro	KO	2 (4)	27 Jul 2001	Leonard's Restaurant, São Caetano do Sul, Brazil	
2	Win	2–0	Jose Acioly de Barros	KO	2 (4)	23 Jun 2001	Bofete Municipal Arena, Bofete, Brazil	
1	Win	1–0	Ronaldo Conceicao	TKO	4 (4)	6 Mar 2001	Ginasio Baby Barione, São Paulo, Brazil	

== See also ==
- List of world featherweight boxing champions

Sporting positions
Regional boxing titles
Vacant Title last held by Whyber Garcia	WBA Fedelatin featherweight champion 11 December 2004 – 2005; Vacated	Vacant Title next held by Renan Acosta
World boxing titles
Vacant Title last held by Juan Manuel Márquez	IBF featherweight champion 20 January 2006 – 13 May 2006	Succeeded by Eric Aiken
