= Hasim Rahman vs. Oleg Maskaev II =

Boxing match

America's Last Line of Defense
- Date: 12 August 2006
- Venue: Thomas & Mack Center, Las Vegas, Nevada
- Title(s) on the line: WBC Heavyweight Championship

Tale of the tape
Boxer	(United States) Hasim Rahman	(United States) / (Russia) Oleg Maskaev
Nickname	"The Rock"	"The Big O"
Hometown	Baltimore, Maryland, U.S.	Abay, Karaganda, Kazakhstan
Pre-fight record	41–5–2 (33 KO)	32–5 (25 KO)
Age	33 years, 9 months	37 years, 11 months
Height	6 ft 2 in (188 cm)	6 ft 3 in (191 cm)
Weight	235 lb (107 kg)	238 lb (108 kg)
Style	Orthodox	Orthodox
Recognition	WBC; Heavyweight Champion; The Ring; No. 2 Ranked Heavyweight	WBC; No. 1 Ranked Heavyweight

Result
- Maskaev wins via 12th-round TKO

Hasim Rahman vs. Oleg Maskaev II, billed as America's Last Line of Defense, was a professional boxing match contested on 12 August 2006, for the WBC heavyweight championship.

== Background ==
Since the retirement of Vitali Klitschko elevated him to a two time Heavyweight Champion, Hasim Rahman had made one defence, a majority draw against James Toney. Despite calls for a rematch Rahman's promoter Bob Arum stated that Rahman would face his mandatory challenger Oleg Maskaev, who had beaten former European champion Sinan Şamil Sam in a WBC eliminator bout the previous November.

The two had faced each other in November 1999 where Maskaev stunned Rahman with an 8th-round KO where Rahman was sent out of the ring, landing next to HBO's Jim Lampley.

The bout was billed as "America's Last Line of Defense" in recognition of the fact that Rahman was the only US born heavyweight who currently held a version of the heavyweight title, this despite Maskaev being a naturalized US citizen. Although Arum had been pursuing a defense against Calvin Brock in November, it was hoped that a Rahman victory would set a New Year clash with IBF champion Wladimir Klitschko, despite Klitschko adviser Shelly Finkel coming to terms with Shannon Briggs to fight Klitschko on 11 November, the deal had remained unsigned in the hope that Wladimir would face the winner of Rahman vs Maskaev.

== The fight ==
Rahman controlled most of the early rounds, using his jab and combination punching to dictate the tempo of the fight. Maskaev was consistently warned by referee Jay Nady about excessive holding, which the ringside HBO commentators, which included Lennox Lewis, felt was unwarranted and one-sided.

Maskaev knocked down Rahman early in the final round, with a left right combination. Rahman made it up but soon he was holding on to the rope to stay on his feet. Maskaev landed a flurry of blows prompting the referee to wave off the bout in order to save Rahman from further punishment.

Two of the three judges Jerry Roth and Glenn Trowbridge had Maskaev ahead with scores of 104–105 & 103–106, while Anek Hongtongkam had it for Rahman 106–103.

HBO's Harold Lederman had the bout scored 104–105 for Maskaev going into the 12th round, ESPN.com's Dan Rafael had it 106–103 for Rahman, with his colleague David Cooper having it 105–104 for Rahman.

== Aftermath ==
Speaking after the fight Maskaev said "I'm proud of where I come from, but I consider myself a Russian-American...this is a message to everyone: European fighters are tough."

There was talk of Klitschko fighting Maskaev in a title unification match at Madison Square Garden in November, however Maskaev oped to face the little known Okello Peter in December while Klitschko faced Brock.

== Undercard ==
Confirmed bouts:

== Broadcasting ==
Country	Broadcaster
United States	HBO

Preceded by vs. James Toney	Hasim Rahman's bouts 12 August 2006	Succeeded by vs. Taurus Sykes
Preceded by vs. Sinan Şamil Sam	Oleg Maskaev's bouts 12 August 2006	Succeeded by vs. Okello Peter
