= Hasim Rahman vs. Lennox Lewis II =

Boxing competition

Final Judgment
- Date: November 17, 2001
- Venue: Mandalay Bay Events Center, Paradise, Nevada, U.S.
- Title(s) on the line: WBC, IBF, and IBO heavyweight titles

Tale of the tape
Boxer	Hasim Rahman	Lennox Lewis
Nickname	The Rock	The Lion
Hometown	Baltimore, Maryland, U.S.	London, England
Purse	$10,000,000	$11,000,000
Pre-fight record	35–2 (29 KO)	38–2–1 (29 KO)
Age	29 years	36 years, 2 months
Height	6 ft 2 1/2 in (189 cm)	6 ft 5 in (196 cm)
Weight	236 lb (107 kg)	246 1/2 lb (112 kg)
Style	Orthodox	Orthodox
Recognition	WBC, IBF, and IBO; Heavyweight Champion	WBC; No. 2 Ranked Heavyweight; IBF; No. 3 Ranked Heavyweight; Former undisputed heavyweight champion

Result
- Lewis wins via 4th-round knockout

Hasim Rahman vs. Lennox Lewis II, billed as Final Judgment, was a heavyweight professional boxing match contested between unified WBC, IBF, IBO and lineal champion Hasim Rahman and former undisputed heavyweight champion Lennox Lewis. The bout took place on November 17, 2001 at the Mandalay Bay Events Center in Paradise, Nevada, and served as a rematch of their April 22 bout in which Rahman scored a major upset. In the rematch, Lewis won by knockout.

== Background ==
On April 22, 2001, 20–1 underdog Hasim Rahman pulled off one of the biggest upsets in boxing history after he was able to knock out the heavily favored champion Lennox Lewis in the fifth round of their fight. Following his victory, Rahman joined powerful promoter Don King's promotional firm. Rahman also received multimillion-dollar offers from cable giants Showtime and HBO which would allow them to exclusively air his fights. Showtime offered Rahman $19.25 million to make his first defense against their premier fighter Mike Tyson, while HBO countered with a $17 million offer to meet Lewis in a rematch. Rahman, however, turned down both offers and instead opted to take a less lucrative fight against fringe contender David Izon that would net him $5 million. Lewis, however, had a rematch clause installed in the contract for his previous fight with Rahman and went to court in hopes of having Rahman make his first defense against him. In June, a judge ruled in Lewis' favor and both Rahman and Lewis agreed to a rematch to take place on November 17.

While promoting the fight, both Rahman and Lewis made an appearance on ESPN's interview show Up Close hosted by Gary Miller. Rahman had done an earlier radio interview in which he criticized Lewis' decision to sue him for breach of contract, calling it "gay." When this was brought up during the interview with Miller, Lewis defended himself stating that he was "100 percent a woman's man" and that if Rahman had any worries to "bring his sister." Rahman then took offense and the two stood up and went face-to-face before Lewis delivered a slight push to Rahman which in turn started a scuffle between the two men. As staff ran in to break up the melee, Rahman was able to shove Lewis onto the interview table which then collapsed under Lewis' weight before the two were separated.

== The fight ==
Unlike the previous fight between the two, Lewis came into fight prepared and dominated the duration of the fight. Lewis effectively and efficiently used his trademark left jab to take control of the fight and opened up a cut above Rahman's left eye in the first round. After easily winning the first three rounds on all three judges' scorecards, Lewis was able to win the fight a little past the midway point of round four. Lewis connected with a left–right combination that sent Rahman crashing to the mat. Rahman attempted to get back up but collapsed back to the mat at the referee's count of nine. Lewis was then named the winner by knockout, regaining his heavyweight titles in the process.

== Aftermath ==
Next for Lewis would be his highly anticipated match with Mike Tyson. After several delays, the fight would finally take place June 8, 2002 in Memphis, Tennessee. In what would become the highest grossing heavyweight fight of all time, Lewis was able to outbox Tyson en route to an eighth-round knockout victory over the former undisputed heavyweight champion. After one more fight in 2003, a victory over a then up-and-coming Vitali Klitschko, Lewis retired in 2004 as the reigning WBC, IBO and lineal heavyweight champion.

Rahman's comeback from his loss would start off poorly. He would lose his next fight against an aging Evander Holyfield by technical decision after developing a severe hematoma that caused massive swelling over his left eye. Rahman followed his loss to Holyfield with a draw against fellow heavyweight contender David Tua before meeting John Ruiz for the vacant WBA heavyweight title, though he would lose by unanimous decision. In 2005, however, Rahman would briefly regain the WBC title by defeating Monte Barrett before dropping it the following year to Oleg Maskaev.

== Undercard ==
Confirmed bouts:

== Broadcasting ==
Country	Broadcaster
Australia	Main Event
United Kingdom	Sky Sports
United States	HBO

Preceded by First Fight	Hasim Rahman's bouts 17 November 2001	Succeeded by vs. Evander Holyfield
Preceded by First Fight	Lennox Lewis's bouts 17 November 2001	Succeeded by vs. Mike Tyson
Awards
Previous: Robert Garcia vs. Ben Tackie	The Ring Knockout of the Year; 2001	Next: Lennox Lewis vs. Mike Tyson
