= Mike Tyson vs. Andrew Golota =

Boxing competition

Showdown in Motown
- Date: October 20, 2000
- Venue: The Palace, Auburn Hills, Michigan, US

Tale of the tape
Boxer	Mike Tyson	Andrew Golota
Nickname	Iron	
Hometown	Catskill, New York, US	Warsaw, Masovian, Poland
Purse	$10,000,000	$2,200,000
Pre-fight record	48–3 (1) (42 KO)	36–4 (29 KO)
Age	34 years, 3 months	32 years, 9 months
Height	5 ft 10 in (178 cm)	6 ft 4 in (193 cm)
Weight	222 lb (101 kg)	240 lb (109 kg)
Style	Orthodox	Orthodox
Recognition	WBC; No. 2 Ranked Heavyweight; WBA; No. 5 Ranked Heavyweight; IBF; No. 9 Ranked Heavyweight; Former undisputed heavyweight champion	WBC; No. 9 Ranked Heavyweight

Result
- Originally a win via 3rd–round RTD by Tyson but overturned to a no contest after he failed a drug test

Mike Tyson vs. Andrew Golota, billed as Showdown in Motown, was a professional boxing match contested on October 20, 2000.

== Background ==
After serving a 15-month ban because of his actions during his 1997 match with Evander Holyfield, Tyson returned in January 1999 with a fifth-round knockout win over heavyweight contender, Francois Botha. After Botha, Tyson had little trouble with his next three opponents. He fought a no-contest with Orlin Norris. Norris was injured and could not continue after the first round. Further fights included a second-round knockout against veteran Julius Francis followed by a 34-second knockout versus fringe contender Lou Savarese. On August 30, 2000, the announcement came that Tyson's next fight would be against former heavyweight title challenger Andrew Golota. Both men came into the fight with reputations as dirty fighters which led some to doubt whether the two could have a clean fight. Two of Golota's most notable fights were against Riddick Bowe, where both times, Golota was disqualified for hitting Bowe below the waist. Meanwhile, Tyson was notoriously disqualified in his rematch with Holyfield for biting both of Holyfield's ears and had a history of hitting after the bell, repeated in his fights against Botha, Norris and Savarese. Golota publicly stated that he planned to fight cleanly. Tyson stated that he hoped he would obtain a quick knockout victory over Golota.

== The fights ==
=== Undercard ===
The first televised bout saw unbeaten Alex Trujillo survive a fourth round knockdown to defeat WBC No. 10 ranked lightweight Jose Luis Juarez. The second saw Laila Ali be taken the distance for the first time in her career by Kendra Lenhart. Ali would nevertheless take a unanimous decision victory.

=== Judah vs. Quiroz ===
In the chief support, IBF 140 lb champion Zab Judah faced No. 15 ranked contender Hector Quiroz.

Judah would dominate the bout, despite lapses in the action prompting boos from the crowd, landing enough sharp punches to the head to swell Quiroz's right cheek and cause his right eye to nearly close.

About a minute left in the 8th round, referee Dale Grable stopped the bout on the advice of the ringside physician due to the swelling.

=== Main Event ===
As usual, Tyson started the fight aggressively by landing several power punches on Golota within the first 30 seconds of round one. Golota was able to withstand Tyson's early assault and effectively used his left jab and height advantage for the next two minutes to remain in the fight. During the final 30 seconds, Tyson became more aggressive and threw two big right crosses at Golota, one of which connected. Golota was forced to clinch Tyson in an effort to slow him down. After the referee separated the two, Tyson connected with a powerful right cross that dropped Golota to the canvas. Golota was able to get back up just before the round came to an end, but he was now bleeding from a cut above his left eye. After the first round, Golota twice asked his trainer to stop the fight. Hoping to secure the knockout victory, Tyson continued his aggressive assault in the second round, prompting Golota to clinch Tyson several times to try to slow down Tyson's furious rally and reduce the effectiveness of Tyson's power punches. Though Golota attempted to fight back, Tyson was able to easily win the round on all three judges' scorecards.

In between rounds two and three, Golota told his corner that he would not continue, and began walking across the ring, and as the bell for the third round approached, referee Frank Garza informed Golota that he still had a few seconds to change his mind and come back fighting, but to no avail. Despite a desperate urging on the part of both his trainer and his cornermen, Golota refused to continue the fight — as the bell rang, Garza approached the opposite corner and raised Tyson's hand, awarding him victory via a technical knockout.

== Aftermath ==
The fans who attended the fight were angry and pelted Golota with garbage as he retreated to the dressing room. It was eventually discovered that Golota was suffering multiple injuries that influenced his decision not to continue. At the hospital, it was discovered that Golota had suffered a concussion, a fractured left cheekbone and a herniated disc during the fight. Golota left boxing for almost three years before returning on August 14, 2003.

Early in 2001, the Michigan Athletic Board of Control issued a three-month suspension to Tyson based on his refusal to submit to a pre-fight urine test, opting instead to take one after the fight. Days after his suspension was announced, it was discovered that Tyson had tested positive for marijuana after the fight. Because of this, his victory over Golota was overturned and changed to a no-contest.

== Undercard ==
Confirmed bouts:

Winner	Loser	Weight division/title belt(s) disputed	Result
(United States) Zab Judah	(Mexico) Hector Quiroz	IBF Light Welterweight Championship	8th-round TKO.
(United States) Laila Ali	(United States) Kendra Lenhart	Super middleweight (6 rounds)	Unanimous decision.
(Puerto Rico) Alex Trujillo	(Mexico) Jose Luis Juarez	Light welterweight (10 rounds)	Unanimous decision.
Non-TV bouts
(Nigeria) David Izon	(Mexico) Mike Sedillo	Heavyweight (10 rounds)	3rd-round TKO.
(Philippines) Luisito Espinosa	(Mexico) Ramon Aragon	Super featherweight (8 rounds)	4th-round RTD.
(United States) Dominick Guinn	(United States) Rodney Phillips	Heavyweight (6 rounds)	1st-round TKO.
(United States) Anthony Hanshaw	(United States) Demetrius Johnson	Light heavyweight (6 rounds)	1st-round TKO.

== Broadcasting ==
Country	Broadcaster
Australia	Main Event
Philippines	IBC
Poland	TVP 2
United Kingdom	Sky Sports
United States	Showtime

Preceded by vs. Lou Savarese	Mike Tyson's bouts October 20, 2000	Succeeded by vs. Brian Nielsen
Preceded by vs. Orlin Norris	Andrew Golota's bouts October 20, 2000	Succeeded by vs. Brian Nix
