= Hasim Rahman =

American boxer (born 1972)

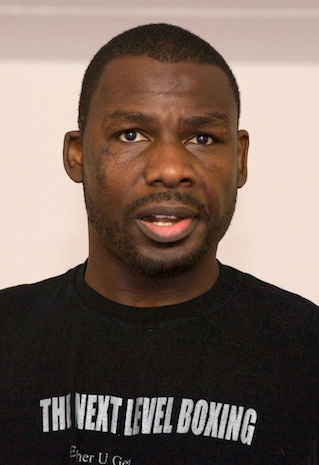
- Rahman in 2008

Personal information
- Nickname: The Rock
- Born: Hasim Shariff Rahman; November 7, 1972 (age 53) Baltimore, Maryland, U.S.
- Height: 6 ft 2 1/2 in (189 cm)
- Weight: Heavyweight

Boxing career
- Reach: 82 in (208 cm)
- Stance: Orthodox

Boxing record
- Total fights: 63
- Wins: 50
- Win by KO: 41
- Losses: 10
- Draws: 2
- No contests: 1

Hasim Sharif Rahman (born November 7, 1972) is an American professional boxer. He is a two-time world heavyweight champion, having held the unified WBC, IBF, IBO and lineal titles in 2001; and the WBC title again from 2005 to 2006. He was ranked as a top 10 heavyweight by BoxRec from 2000 to 2007, and reached his highest ranking of world No.6 in 2000.

Rahman first became known on the world stage in 2001 when he scored an upset knockout victory against Lennox Lewis to win the unified heavyweight championship. Lewis avenged the loss and regained his championship by knocking out Rahman in a rematch later that year. Rahman won the WBC title (initially the interim version) for a second time in 2005 by defeating Monte Barrett, after which the WBC elevated him to full champion status by the year's end. His reign as champion ended in 2006 via another knockout loss, this time to Oleg Maskaev in a rematch of their first fight in 1999.

== Early life ==
Born on November 7, 1972, Rahman was raised in Baltimore, Maryland.

As a teenager, Rahman was an enforcer for drug dealers, and was known for surviving several shootings. He nearly died in a car accident (which left him with permanent scarring on his cheek and ear) and once survived a shooting where five bullets entered his body.

== Professional career ==
=== Early career ===
Rahman started boxing at a relatively late age, taking up the sport at the age of 20. He had just 10 amateur bouts before making his pro debut on December 3, 1994, at age 22. Rahman tried to compensate on his lack of amateur background by being busy in the pros, sometimes fighting within five days from the previous bout. Rahman had nine professional fights in 1995, and eleven in 1996.

Rahman had obvious natural boxing skills that propelled him to 11 knockout wins in his first 12 fights. He took a step up in class in March 1996 with a 10-round decision win over veteran Ross Puritty and seven months later, he repeated the feat against former world champion Trevor Berbick. In July 1997, he won the regional USBA heavyweight title, and four months later, he added another regional belt, the IBF Intercontinental heavyweight title, defending the USBA title three times and the Intercontinental belt twice.

=== Rise up the ranks ===
==== Rahman vs. Tua ====
On December 19, 1998, Rahman faced fellow contender David Tua in a fight to determine the IBF's mandatory contender. Rahman was using his power jab well, out boxing Tua virtually every round. At the end of the 9th round Tua staggered Rahman with a devastating punch after the bell that dazed him. At the beginning of the next round Tua hit him with several heavy shots and the referee jumped in when Rahman was bobbing and weaving. Tua won by TKO. It was argued that it should have been a DQ.

==== Rahman vs. Maskaev ====
Because of the controversial nature of the loss, Rahman's ranking did not suffer, but in November 1999, he was knocked out by Oleg Maskaev in the eighth round of a fight he looked to be winning. At the end of the fight, Rahman was knocked through the ropes onto the floor, hitting his head on the floor. Rahman dropped out of The Ring top 10 as a result of the surprise loss. Rahman later said that he had seen Maskaev earlier in his career get knocked out in the first round by former champion Oliver McCall and he assumed he was brought in as an easy win. Rahman claimed that because of this, he did not train as hard as he should have and was beaten.

=== First reign as heavyweight champion ===
==== Rahman vs. Lewis ====
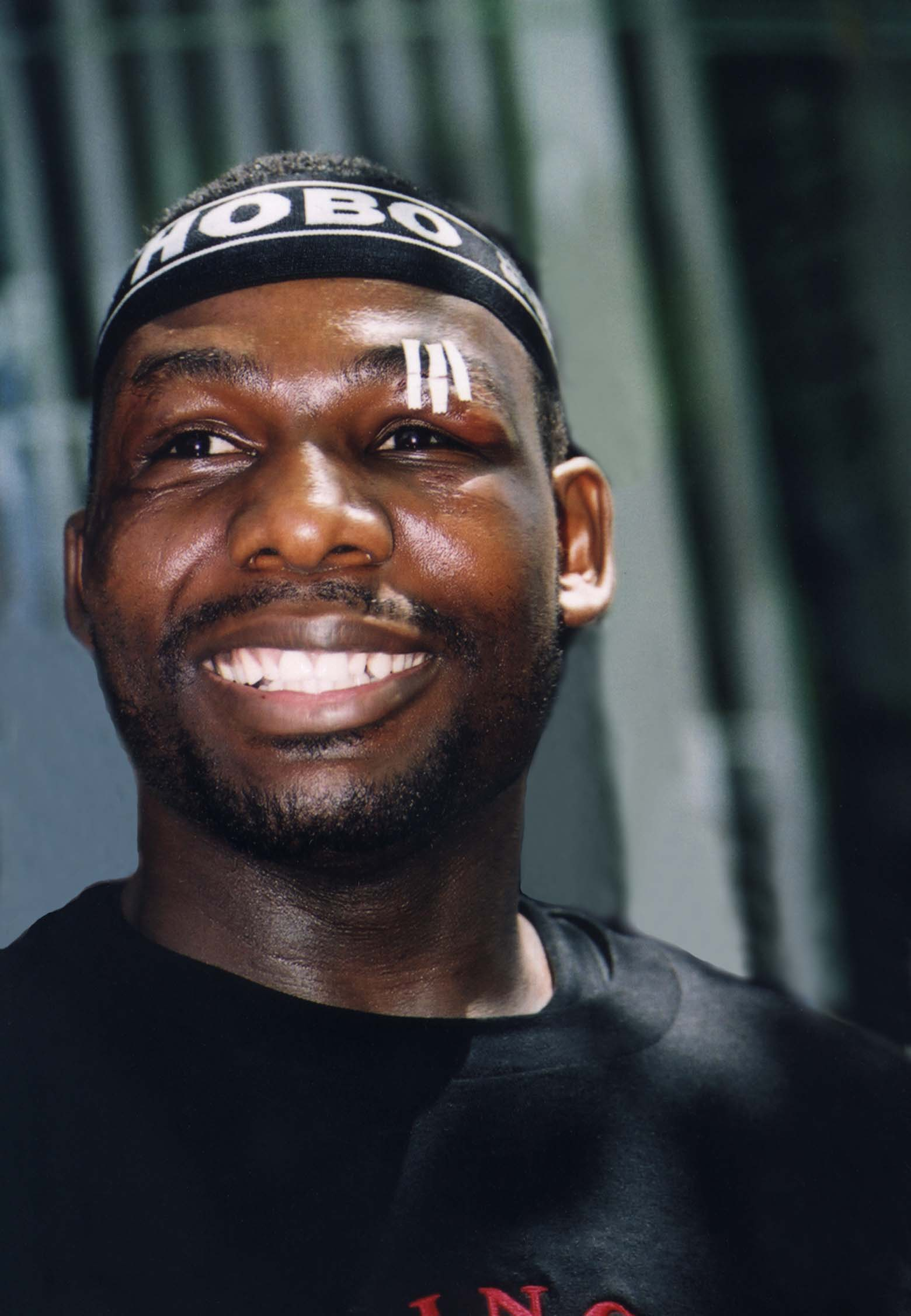
Rahman in 2001

Rahman came back with three wins, including one in May 2000 over Corrie Sanders in a war in which he was dropped twice and came back to win in 7, and after that he was moved back up in the rankings. After this fight, Sanders briefly retired. Finally, on April 22, 2001, Rahman earned a shot at Lennox Lewis the WBC, IBO and IBF heavyweight champion with a win over Frankie Swindell. Rahman beat Swindell via 7th-round RTD. Swindell quit on his stool after the 7th round, informing the ringside doctor that he had suffered an eye injury.

In the fight, held at Brakpan, South Africa, Lewis and Rahman traded hard blows for five rounds before Rahman, a 20-to-1 underdog, stunned the crowd by defeating Lewis via 5th-round KO. It was only the second loss of Lewis' career. His first was on September 24, 1994, when Oliver McCall defeated him via 2nd-round TKO.

==== Rahman vs. Lewis II ====
Lewis had an immediate-rematch clause in the contract for his defense against Hasim, and chose to invoke it. Rahman and his new promoter, Don King, made plans to defend the titles against David Izon, rather than giving Lewis his rematch. Lewis sued Rahman in U.S. federal court to enforce their contract. The judge, Neil McCluskey sided with Lewis and on November 17, 2001, in Las Vegas, the two men met again. This time, Lewis brutally knocked Rahman out in the fourth round. For the rematch, Lewis made $11 million and Rahman got $10 million. The fight generated 460,000 pay-per-view buys and $23 million in revenue.

=== Return to the ring ===
==== Rahman vs. Holyfield ====
Rahman's comeback fight ended in disappointment, he was beaten by a technical decision by aging former champion Evander Holyfield after headbutts from Holyfield caused a massive swelling (severe hematoma) on Rahman's forehead.

==== Rahman vs. Tua II ====
On March 29, 2003, Rahman faced David Tua for a second time. The fight was ruled a draw after one judge scored it for Rahman, a second for Tua and a third had the score even. Tua was knocked down a split second after the bell rang and it was not ruled an official knockdown. Rahman came in at the heaviest weight of his career. In June, Rahman was elevated to the No. 1 contender's position by the WBC.

==== Rahman vs. Ruiz ====
On December 13, Rahman was matched with former WBA world champion John Ruiz, in a match for an Interim WBA heavyweight title (caused by Roy Jones Jr. deciding whether he wanted to stay a heavyweight or return to Light Heavyweight). Rahman was favored, but he lost by (twelve round) unanimous decision and again was out of condition. Ruiz, who became interim titleholder with this victory, was upgraded to WBA heavyweight champion after Roy Jones Jr. vacated the title on February 20, 2004, choosing to fight Antonio Tarver for the WBC and IBO light heavyweight titles (already in 2003), rather than Ruiz.

==== Rahman vs. Meehan ====
After this defeat, Rahman stepped back to a lower level of competition and defeated four journeyman fighters while working to get back into shape. His efforts paid off when he was rewarded with a fight against Kali Meehan on November 13, 2004. The fight was an elimination bout for the IBF, WBA, and WBC, with the winner being the number-one contender in more than one world-title organization. Rahman scored the victory by a fourth-round knockout at New York City's Madison Square Garden.

=== Second reign as heavyweight champion ===
==== Rahman vs. Barrett ====
The WBC designated Rahman as Vitali Klitschko's next mandatory challenger; the fight was set for April 30, 2005. Klitschko injured his thigh while training for the fight, so it was rescheduled for June 18. As this date approached, Klitschko's camp said that the thigh had not fully healed; the WBC made July 23 the new fight date. Soon after this second postponement, Vitali's doctors reportedly discovered back injuries that they said demanded minor-yet-immediate corrective surgery. The WBC pushed Rahman's title shot back again, this time to November 12; Rahman's share of the purse following this match would reportedly be around US$4.2 million.

After this third rescheduling, Rahman, fought for a WBC "Interim" heavyweight championship and defeated Monte Barrett on August 13, 2005, via unanimous decision.

At this point, Klitschko would be stripped of his WBC title if his first fight back was not against Rahman. On November 7, it was announced that Klitschko had suffered severe right knee injuries during training; the WBC said it would strip him of the championship if he was unable to box within 60–90 days of a soon-to-be-announced base date. However, on November 9, Vitali Klitschko retired instead. On November 10, 2005, the WBC voted to award its heavyweight championship to Rahman, making Rahman a two-time heavyweight champion.

On December 9, 2005, a U.S. Bankruptcy Court judge ended Rahman's contract with Don King and he signed instead with Top Rank Boxing.

==== Rahman vs. Toney ====
On March 18, 2006, Rahman fought James Toney to a draw, in a 12-round fight in Atlantic City, New Jersey, and he retained the WBC heavyweight title. The judges scorecards read 114–114, 117–111 and 114–114. Judges Tom Kaczmarek and Nobuaki Uratani had Toney leading by one point heading into the 12th. Rahman only retained the title by winning the final round.

Rahman reached his peak rankings in 2006. The April 2006 issue of the Ring ranked him the #2 heavyweight in the world after IBF champion Chris Byrd. BoxRec retroactively ranked him #4 that year, below Nikolai Valuev, Lamon Brewster, and Chris Byrd.

==== Rahman vs. Maskaev II ====
On August 12, 2006, Rahman lost the WBC heavyweight championship to rival Oleg Maskaev by 12th Round TKO in a mandatory defense of his title. Rahman led on the judges' scorecards for most of the close fight, with the three judges respectively scoring it 106–103 for Rahman, 103–106 for Maskaev, and 105–104 for Rahman going into 12th round; Rahman landed 250 punches throughout the bout (47% accuracy) to Maskaev's 184 (28% accuracy). However, Rahman was knocked down early in the 12th and eventually stumbled to the mat. Rahman was then holding on to the ropes to stay on his feet. Maskaev landed a flurry of punches with Rahman unable to defend himself. The referee stopped the bout to save Rahman from further punishment. Afterwards he said he should have followed his trainer's game plan by staying cautious in the last round to win on points, instead of rushing Maskaev, mistakenly thinking him too tired to fight back.

=== Post-title career ===
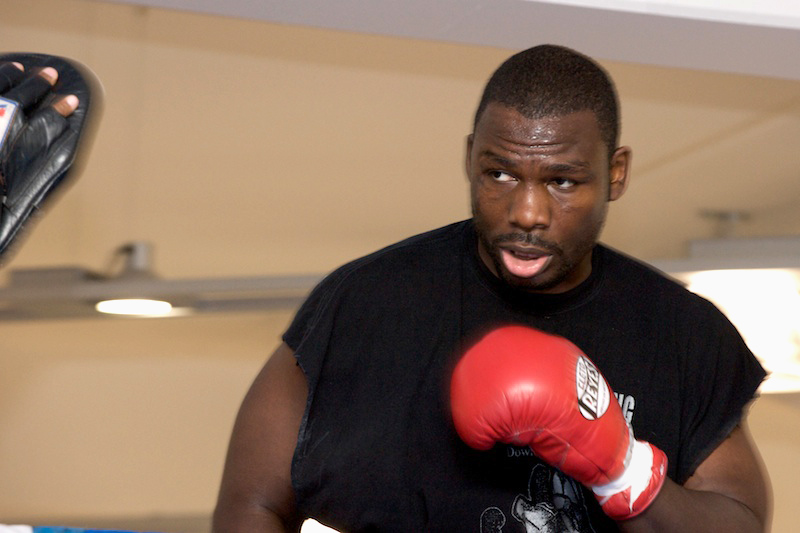
Rahman during training, 2008

After a 10-month layoff, Rahman resumed his career with a ten-round unanimous decision over Taurus Sykes June 14, 2007, at The Main Street Armory in Rochester, New York. Rahman then fought three times in three months defeating Dicky Ryan by second-round TKO on September 7, 2007. Hasim followed up by stopping Cerrone Fox on October 18, 2007. On November 15, 2007, Rahman then scored a 10th-round TKO for the NABF title against Zuri Lawrence. In this fight, Lawrence fell through the ropes on two occasions whilst ducking punches, once in round six and again in round nine. In round six, he landed on the floor below the ring, but beat the referee's 20-count. He received a standing ovation from the crowd when he re-entered the ring.

==== Rahman vs. Toney II ====
Going into 2008, the 35 year old Rahman was still considered a potent fighter. He held the NABF continental title and was ranked #4 by the IBF and #8 by the WBO. BoxRec retroactively ranked him the world's 8th best heavyweight in 2007. However, his two fights in that year would both end in defeat.

On July 16, 2008, Rahman was stopped by an accidental headbutt against James Toney. Toney was originally awarded a TKO victory as the referee declared Rahman had quit between rounds. A week later, the TKO victory was overturned and changed to a No Contest due to the headbutt. After three rounds, Toney was ahead on 29–28 on two of the judges cards while Rahman was ahead, 29–28 on the third card.

==== Rahman vs. Klitschko ====
Rahman lost to Wladimir Klitschko by TKO in the 7th round on December 13, 2008, for his WBO, IBO & IBF titles. Klitschko dominated the fight, winning every round while making good use of his left jab. Rahman seemed unable to withstand the Ukrainian's punch power. The referee called a stop to the contest in the 7th round after Rahman failed to respond to a series of shots, having been knocked down in the sixth round and left visibly disoriented. At the time of the stoppage, Klitschko was leading on all three judges scorecards, respectively 60–53, 60–53, and 60–47; Klitschko landed 178 punches (48% accuracy) to Rahman's 30 (14% accuracy), a nearly six-fold disparity.

In an interview dated February 26, 2009, with DreamFighters.com, Rahman expressed his interest in crossing over into mixed martial arts.

Fifteen months after the seventh round loss to Wladimir Klitschko in December 2008, Rahman made a comeback against 43-year-old journeyman Clinton Boldridge winning the fight via TKO 1. Rahman next fought on June 19, 2010, against journeyman Shannon Miller (16–4, 9 KO) in a match that took in the Niagara Falls Conference Centre, Niagara Falls, New York, United States. Rahman came into the ring at 260 pounds and won the bout by TKO in the 4th round, after sending Miller down in each of the four rounds. He then won his next three fights (all by knockout), against Damon Reed, Marcus McGee and Galen Brown. His win over Galen Brown marked Rahmans 50th professional win in his career. With this win, he ran his record to 5-0 (all wins via knock out) since his loss to Wladimir Klitschko.

==== Rahman vs. Povetkin ====
He was elevated to the WBA number one contender to face Alexander Povetkin on September 29, 2012, for the WBA regular heavyweight championship. Povetkin beat Rahman via 2nd-round TKO.

=== Retirement ===
In yet another attempt to re-enter the heavyweight scene Rahman signed up for the super 8 tournament, an elimination-style event staged in Auckland, New Zealand. But despite holding the tag as tournament favorite the ageing Rahman was outpointed by little-known club fighter Anthony Nansen in the quarter-final on June 4, 2014.

=== Comeback ===
At the age of 53, and more than 12 years after his last professional fight, Rahman made a comeback on September 24, 2026, facing 40 year old Phillip Triantafillo (4–4, 1 KO) over six rounds at VFW Post 6841 in Lowell, Indiana. He lost by unanimous decision.

== Personal life ==
Rahman is a practising Muslim and was fasting in the month of Ramadan when he faced Lennox Lewis.

In 2001, Rahman and his family were involved in a car accident shortly after a celebration at City Hall. Rahman sustained no serious injuries and received no medical assistance, while his wife, Crystal, was hospitalized.

Rahman has a son, Hasim Rahman Jr., who is a professional boxer as well.

== Professional boxing record ==
| 63 fights | 50 wins | 10 losses |
|---|---|---|
| By knockout | 41 | 6 |
| By decision | 9 | 4 |
| Draws | 2 | |
| No contests | 1 | |

| No. | Result | Record | Opponent | Type | Round, time | Date | Location | Notes |
|---|---|---|---|---|---|---|---|---|
| 63 | Loss | 50–10–2 (1) | Phillip Triantafillo | UD | 6 | Sep 24, 2026 | VFW Post 6841, Lowell, Indiana, U.S. | For Indiana State heavyweight title |
| 62 | Loss | 50–9–2 (1) | Anthony Nansen | UD | 3 | Jun 4, 2014 | The Trusts Arena, Auckland, New Zealand | Super Eight Boxing Tournament I: heavyweight quarter-final |
| 61 | Loss | 50–8–2 (1) | Alexander Povetkin | TKO | 2 (12), 1:46 | Sep 29, 2012 | Alsterdorfer Sporthalle, Hamburg, Germany | For WBA (Regular) heavyweight title |
| 60 | Win | 50–7–2 (1) | Galen Brown | TKO | 6 (10), 1:45 | Jun 11, 2011 | DeSoto Civic Center, Southaven, Mississippi, U.S. | |
| 59 | Win | 49–7–2 (1) | Marcus McGee | KO | 1 (8), 3:00 | Oct 2, 2010 | Roberto Durán Arena, Panama City, Panama | |
| 58 | Win | 48–7–2 (1) | Damon Reed | KO | 6 (10), 2:20 | Aug 14, 2010 | Scope, Norfolk, Virginia, U.S. | |
| 57 | Win | 47–7–2 (1) | Shannon Miller | TKO | 4 (10), 1:37 | Jun 19, 2010 | The Conference & Event Center, Niagara Falls, New York, U.S. | |
| 56 | Win | 46–7–2 (1) | Clinton Boldridge | TKO | 1 (6), 2:50 | Mar 26, 2010 | Beaumont Club, Kansas City, Missouri, U.S. | |
| 55 | Loss | 45–7–2 (1) | Wladimir Klitschko | TKO | 7 (12), 0:44 | Dec 13, 2008 | SAP Arena, Mannheim, Germany | For IBF, WBO, and IBO heavyweight titles |
| 54 | NC | 45–6–2 (1) | James Toney | TKO | 3 (12), 3:00 | Jul 16, 2008 | Pechanga Resort & Casino, Temecula, California, U.S. | Vacant WBO–NABO heavyweight title at stake; Originally a TKO win for Toney, later ruled an NC after an incorrect referee call |
| 53 | Win | 45–6–2 | Zuri Lawrence | TKO | 10 (10), 2:20 | Nov 15, 2007 | Sovereign Center, Reading, Pennsylvania, U.S. | Retained NABF heavyweight title |
| 52 | Win | 44–6–2 | Cerrone Fox | TKO | 1 (10), 2:27 | Oct 18, 2007 | Kewadin Casino, Sault Ste. Marie, Michigan, U.S. | |
| 51 | Win | 43–6–2 | Dicky Ryan | TKO | 2 (10), 0:41 | Sep 7, 2007 | Soaring Eagle Casino & Resort, Mount Pleasant, Michigan, U.S. | |
| 50 | Win | 42–6–2 | Taurus Sykes | UD | 10 | Jun 14, 2007 | Main Street Armory, Rochester, New York, U.S. | Won NABF interim heavyweight title |
| 49 | Loss | 41–6–2 | Oleg Maskaev | TKO | 12 (12), 2:17 | Aug 12, 2006 | Thomas & Mack Center, Paradise, Nevada, U.S. | Lost WBC heavyweight title |
| 48 | Draw | 41–5–2 | James Toney | MD | 12 | Mar 18, 2006 | Boardwalk Hall, Atlantic City, New Jersey, U.S. | Retained WBC heavyweight title |
| 47 | Win | 41–5–1 | Monte Barrett | UD | 12 | Aug 13, 2005 | United Center, Chicago, Illinois, U.S. | Won vacant WBC interim heavyweight title |
| 46 | Win | 40–5–1 | Kali Meehan | RTD | 4 (12), 3:00 | Nov 13, 2004 | Madison Square Garden, New York City, New York, U.S. | |
| 45 | Win | 39–5–1 | Terrence Lewis | KO | 2 (10), 0:43 | Jul 28, 2004 | Frontier Field, Rochester, New York, U.S. | |
| 44 | Win | 38–5–1 | Rob Calloway | KO | 2 (10), 2:00 | Jun 17, 2004 | Michael's Eighth Avenue, Glen Burnie, Maryland, U.S. | |
| 43 | Win | 37–5–1 | Mario Cawley | TKO | 2 (8), 2:25 | Apr 16, 2004 | Dover Downs, Dover, Delaware, U.S. | |
| 42 | Win | 36–5–1 | Al Cole | UD | 10 | Mar 11, 2004 | Michael's Eighth Avenue, Glen Burnie, Maryland, U.S. | |
| 41 | Loss | 35–5–1 | John Ruiz | UD | 12 | Dec 13, 2003 | Boardwalk Hall, Atlantic City, New Jersey, U.S. | For WBA interim heavyweight title |
| 40 | Draw | 35–4–1 | David Tua | SD | 12 | Mar 29, 2003 | Spectrum, Philadelphia, Pennsylvania, U.S. | |
| 39 | Loss | 35–4 | Evander Holyfield | TD | 8 (12), 1:19 | Jun 1, 2002 | Boardwalk Hall, Atlantic City, New Jersey, U.S. | Split TD: Rahman sustained eye swelling after an accidental head clash |
| 38 | Loss | 35–3 | Lennox Lewis | KO | 4 (12), 1:29 | Nov 17, 2001 | Mandalay Bay Events Center, Paradise, Nevada, U.S. | Lost WBC, IBF, and IBO heavyweight titles |
| 37 | Win | 35–2 | Lennox Lewis | KO | 5 (12), 2:32 | Apr 22, 2001 | Carnival City, Brakpan, South Africa | Won WBC, IBF, and IBO heavyweight titles |
| 36 | Win | 34–2 | Frankie Swindell | RTD | 7 (10), 3:00 | Aug 4, 2000 | The Joint, Paradise, Nevada, U.S. | |
| 35 | Win | 33–2 | Corrie Sanders | TKO | 7 (12), 1:50 | May 20, 2000 | Bally's Park Place, Atlantic City, New Jersey, U.S. | Won WBU heavyweight title |
| 34 | Win | 32–2 | Marion Wilson | UD | 10 | Mar 1, 2000 | Martin's West, Woodlawn, Maryland, U.S. | Won vacant Maryland State heavyweight title |
| 33 | Loss | 31–2 | Oleg Maskaev | KO | 8 (10), 0:40 | Nov 6, 1999 | Boardwalk Hall, Atlantic City, New Jersey, U.S. | |
| 32 | Win | 31–1 | Arthur Weathers | KO | 1 (10), 1:44 | Apr 15, 1999 | Miccosukee Resort & Gaming, Miami, Florida, U.S. | |
| 31 | Win | 30–1 | Michael Rush | TKO | 5 (10), 2:40 | Mar 12, 1999 | Roseland Ballroom, New York City, New York, U.S. | |
| 30 | Loss | 29–1 | David Tua | TKO | 10 (12), 0:35 | Dec 19, 1998 | Miccosukee Resort & Gaming, Miami, Florida, U.S. | Lost IBF Inter-Continental and USBA heavyweight titles |
| 29 | Win | 29–0 | Garing Lane | RTD | 2 (10), 3:00 | Jul 9, 1998 | Grand Casino Avoyelles, Marksville, Louisiana, U.S. | |
| 28 | Win | 28–0 | Steve Pannell | KO | 2 (12), 1:48 | Apr 21, 1998 | Players Island Casino, Lake Charles, Louisiana, U.S. | Retained IBF Inter-Continental and USBA heavyweight titles |
| 27 | Win | 27–0 | Melvin Foster | TKO | 2 (10) | Mar 14, 1998 | Olympic Stadium, Moscow, Russia | |
| 26 | Win | 26–0 | Jesse Ferguson | UD | 12 | Jan 31, 1998 | Etess Arena, Atlantic City, New Jersey, U.S. | |
| 25 | Win | 25–0 | Tui Toia | KO | 1 (10), 3:08 | Dec 4, 1997 | Pepsi Arena, Albany, New York, U.S. | |
| 24 | Win | 24–0 | Obed Sullivan | MD | 12 | Nov 1, 1997 | Apollo Theater, New York City, New York, U.S. | Retained USBA heavyweight title; Won IBF Inter-Continental heavyweight title |
| 23 | Win | 23–0 | Jeff Wooden | TKO | 9 (12), 1:44 | Jul 15, 1997 | Riverside Convention Center, Rochester, New York, U.S. | Won vacant USBA heavyweight title |
| 22 | Win | 22–0 | Marshall Tillman | KO | 1 (8), 2:39 | Jan 9, 1997 | Beverly Wilshire Hotel, Los Angeles, California, U.S. | |
| 21 | Win | 21–0 | Herman Delgado | KO | 2 (8), 1:37 | Dec 17, 1996 | National Guard Armory, Pikesville, Maryland, U.S. | |
| 20 | Win | 20–0 | Marcos González | KO | 1 (10) | Dec 3, 1996 | Everton Park Sports Centre, Liverpool, England | |
| 19 | Win | 19–0 | Brian Sargent | TKO | 1 (8), 1:24 | Nov 8, 1996 | Arizona Charlie's Decatur, Las Vegas, Nevada, U.S. | |
| 18 | Win | 18–0 | Trevor Berbick | UD | 10 | Oct 15, 1996 | Convention Hall, Atlantic City, New Jersey, U.S. | |
| 17 | Win | 17–0 | Mark Young | TKO | 3 (8) | Aug 8, 1996 | Sudduth Coliseum, Lake Charles, Louisiana, U.S. | |
| 16 | Win | 16–0 | Martin Foster | KO | 2 (10), 0:57 | Jun 9, 1996 | Fernwood Resort, Bushkill, Pennsylvania, U.S. | |
| 15 | Win | 15–0 | Tim Knight | TKO | 4 (8), 2:43 | Jun 4, 1996 | Martin's West, Woodlawn, Maryland, U.S. | |
| 14 | Win | 14–0 | Steve Edwards | TKO | 2 (6), 2:34 | May 3, 1996 | The MARK of the Quad Cities, Moline, Illinois, U.S. | |
| 13 | Win | 13–0 | Ross Puritty | UD | 10 | Mar 26, 1996 | Blue Cross Arena, Rochester, New York, U.S. | |
| 12 | Win | 12–0 | Mike Mitchell | KO | 1 (8), 1:07 | Mar 9, 1996 | Etess Arena, Atlantic City, New Jersey, U.S. | |
| 11 | Win | 11–0 | Bradley Rone | TKO | 1 (6), 2:27 | Feb 9, 1996 | Tropworld Casino and Entertainment Resort, Atlantic City, New Jersey, U.S. | |
| 10 | Win | 10–0 | Mike Robinson | KO | 1 (6) | Dec 13, 1995 | Tropworld Casino and Entertainment Resort, Atlantic City, New Jersey, U.S. | |
| 9 | Win | 9–0 | James Johnson | TKO | 3 (6) | Oct 10, 1995 | Blue Cross Arena, Rochester, New York, U.S. | |
| 8 | Win | 8–0 | Matt Green | TKO | 2 (6) | Sep 12, 1995 | Martin's West, Woodlawn, Maryland, U.S. | |
| 7 | Win | 7–0 | Carl McGrew | TKO | 1 (6) | Aug 26, 1995 | Bismarck Hotel, Chicago, Illinois, U.S. | |
| 6 | Win | 6–0 | Larry Davis | TKO | 2 (6) | Jul 13, 1995 | Martin's Crosswinds, Greenbelt, Maryland, U.S. | |
| 5 | Win | 5–0 | Eric Valentine | KO | 1 (4) | Jun 6, 1995 | Martin's West, Woodlawn, Maryland, U.S. | |
| 4 | Win | 4–0 | Jeff Williams | MD | 4 | Mar 28, 1995 | Casino Magic, Bay St. Louis, Mississippi, U.S. | |
| 3 | Win | 3–0 | Dennis Cain | TKO | 2 (4), 2:22 | Jan 11, 1995 | Martin's West, Woodlawn, Maryland, U.S. | |
| 2 | Win | 2–0 | Robert Jackson | TKO | 1 (4) | Jan 6, 1995 | Virginia Beach, Virginia, U.S. | |
| 1 | Win | 1–0 | Gregory Herrington | KO | 1 (4), 1:35 | Dec 3, 1994 | Caesars Palace, Paradise, Nevada, U.S. | |

== Titles in boxing ==
Major world titles

- WBC heavyweight champion (200+) (2x)
- IBF heavyweight champion (200+)

Minor world titles

- IBO World Heavyweight Champion
- WBU heavyweight champion (200+)

Interim world titles

- WBC interim heavyweight champion (200+)

Regional/International titles

- NABF heavyweight champion (200+)
- NABF interim heavyweight champion (200+)
- IBF inter-continental heavyweight champion (200+)
- USBA heavyweight champion (200+)
- Maryland state heavyweight champion (200+)

Lineal title

- Lineal heavyweight champion (200+)

Sporting positions
Regional boxing titles
| Vacant Title last held by Lou Savarese | USBA heavyweight champion July 15, 1997 – December 19, 1998 | Succeeded by David Tua |
| Preceded by Obed Sullivan | IBF Inter-Continental heavyweight champion November 1, 1997 – December 19, 1998 | Succeeded by David Tua |
| Vacant Title last held by George Chaplin | Maryland heavyweight champion March 1, 2000 – January 2006; Vacated | Vacant Title next held by Tony Thompson |
| Vacant Title last held by Eliecer Castillo | NABF heavyweight champion Interim title June 14, 2007 – November 15, 2007; Won full title | Vacant Title next held by Travis Walker |
| Vacant Title last held by Samuel Peter | NABF heavyweight champion November 15, 2007 – July 2008; Vacated | Vacant Title next held by Chris Arreola |
Minor world boxing titles
| Preceded by Corrie Sanders | WBU heavyweight champion May 20, 2000 – April 2001; Vacated | Vacant Title next held by Johnny Nelson |
| Preceded by Lennox Lewis | IBO heavyweight champion April 22, 2001 – November 17, 2001 | Succeeded by Lennox Lewis |
Major world boxing titles
| Preceded by Lennox Lewis | WBC heavyweight champion April 22, 2001 – November 17, 2001 | Succeeded by Lennox Lewis |
| Preceded by Lennox Lewis | IBF heavyweight champion April 22, 2001 – November 17, 2001 | Succeeded by Lennox Lewis |
| New title | WBC heavyweight champion Interim title August 13, 2005 – November 9, 2005; Promoted | Vacant Title next held by Samuel Peter |
| Preceded by Vitali Klitschko retired | WBC heavyweight champion November 9, 2005 – August 12, 2006 | Succeeded by Oleg Maskaev |
Awards
| Previous: José Luis Castillo; MD12 Stevie Johnston | The Ring Upset of the Year; KO5 Lennox Lewis; 2001 | Next: Juan Carlos Rubio; UD10 Francisco Bojado |
