= Hinata =

- Pronunciation: Hee-nah-tah (IPA: [çina̠ta̠])
- Gender: Unisex, predominantly female

Origin
- Origin: Japanese
- Meaning: Various meanings

Other names
- Related names: Himari, Himawari, Himuka, Hina, Hiuga, Hyūga, Hizashi

Hinata is a common Japanese given name, and a Japanese family name.

== Written forms and meanings ==
The reading of Hinata can be written using many different combinations of kanji, such as:

- 日, "sun; day; date"
- 日向, "in the sun; facing the sun"
- 日陽, "day sun; sunny yang"
- 日暖, "sunny warmth and geniality; warmth of the sun"
- 日菜, "sunny vegetables"
- 日詩, "sunny poem; poetry of the sun"
- 日南, "sunny south; the sun's southern side; the south of the sun"
- 日寿, "sunny longevity"
- 日当, "daily allowance; per day; sunlit; exposed to the sun"
- 日當, "sunny undertaking; the sun serves; the sun withstands"
- 日方, "sunny side; sunny direction; in the direction of the sun"
- 日宛, "sunny address; just like the sun"
- 日和, "sunny harmony; sunny japan; japan's harmony"
- 日奈多, "many sunny what"
- 日奈太, "large sunny what"
- 日菜多, "many sunny greens"
- 日菜太, "large sunny vegetables"
- 日菜詩, "sunny vegetable poem"
- 日菜珠, "sunny vegetable pearl"
- 日向太, "thick under the sun"
- 日向汰, "elimination under the sun; eliminated under the sun"
- 日向大, "big under the sun"
- 日向陽, "yang under the sun; a sun under the sun; a sun facing towards the sun"
- 日那向, "under that sun; facing towards that sun"
- 日那多, "many sunny what"
- 日那太, "large sunny what"
- 日那田, "sunny what cropland"
- 日南田, "sunny southern cropland; a cropland on the south of the sun"
- 日南羽, "sunny southern feathers; feathers on the south of the sun"
- 日名田, "sunny famous cropland; a famous cropland of the sun"
- 日永田, "sunny eternal cropland"
- 陽向, "in the sun; facing the sun"
- 灯向, "facing towards the lamp; facing towards the lantern"
- 灯成多, "the lamp/lantern becomes many; the lamp/lantern succeeds in many"
- 向日葵, "sunflower"
- 向陽, "towards the sun"
- 太陽, "the sun"
- 春陽, "summer sun; summer yang"
- 暖, "warm and genial"
- 暖太, "large warmth"
- 光暖, "bright and warm; warmth of the light"
- 光永, "bright light forever"
- 彩羽, "colorful feathers"
- 羽叶, "the feather grants; the feather answers; the feather makes it come true"
- 雛多, "many young birds"
- 雛太, "large young bird"
- 雛田, "young bird cropland"
- 雛音, "sounds of a young bird"
- 南, "south; southern"

The name can also be written in hiragana (ひなた) and katakana (ヒナタ), although it loses its meaning in these forms.

== People ==
=== First name ===
==== Male ====
- Hinata Hiiragi (柊木 陽太; born 2011), Japanese actor
- Hinata Maruta (丸田 陽七太; born 1997), Japanese professional boxer
- Hinata Kida (喜田 陽; born 2000), Japanese footballer
- Hinata Konishi (小西 陽向; born 2001), Japanese footballer
- Hinata Watanabe (渡辺 日菜太; born 1986), Japanese kickboxer

==== Female ====
- Hinata, a ring name of Japanese professional wrestler Leon
- Hinata Homma (本間 日陽; born 1999), Japanese idol singer
- Hinata Kashiwagi (柏木 ひなた; born 1999), Japanese idol singer
- Hinata Miyazawa (宮澤 ひなた; born 1999), Japanese women's footballer
- Hinata Satō (佐藤 日向; born 1998), Japanese actress and voice actress
- Hinata Takeda (武田 日向; 1978–2017), Japanese manga artist
- Hinata Terayama (寺山 日葵; 2001), Japanese kickboxer

=== Surname ===
- Megumi Hinata (日向 めぐみ), Japanese musician
- Minami Hinata (日向 未南), Japanese voice actress

== Fictional characters ==
=== First name ===
==== Male ====
- Hinata (ヒナタ), one of Takumi's retainers in Fire Emblem Fates.
- Hinata Aoi (葵 ひなた), a character from the franchise Ensemble Stars!
- Hinata Mutō (日向), a character from the manga series I Am Here!
- Hinata Shintani (陽向), a character from the manga and anime series Kaichou wa Maid-sama!.
- Hinata Shoyo (日向 翔陽), is a fictional character and the main protagonist of the manga series Haikyu!! created by Haruichi Furudate.
- Hinata (ヒナタ), a marriageable candidate in the Japanese farming simulation game Story of Seasons: Trio of Towns.

==== Female ====
- Hinata (ヒナタ; "Solana" in the English version), the female ranger in Pokémon Ranger.
- Hinata Asahi (ひなた), the main character of the manga Suki: A Like Story.
- Hinata Azuma (ひなた), a character from the manga and anime series Kanamemo.
- Hinata Hakamada (ひなた), a character in the Japanese anime Ro-Kyu-Bu!.
- Hinata Hino (日野 日向), a character from the manga and anime series Mirai Nikki.
- Hinata Hiramitsu (平光ひなた) a character in the anime Healin' Good Pretty Cure.
- Hinata Hyuga (日向 ヒナタ), a character from the manga and anime series Naruto.
- Hinata Kawamoto (ひなた), a character from the manga and anime series March Comes in Like a Lion.
- Hinata Komone (日向), a character from the manga series Today's Cerberus.
- Hinata Kuraue (ひなた), a character from the manga series Encouragement of Climb.
- Hinata Miyake (日向), a character from the anime series A Place Further Than the Universe.
- Hinata Okano (ひなた), a character from the visual novel Wind: A Breath of Heart.
- Hinata Okano (岡野 ひなた), a character from the Assassination Classroom manga and anime series.
- Hinata Sakaguchi (ヒナタ), a character from the light novel, manga and anime series That Time I Got Reincarnated as a Slime.
- Hinata Sawanoguchi (日向), a character from the manga Koimoku.
- Hinata Sohma (日向), the baby sister of Hiro Sohma from the manga Fruits Basket.
- Hinata Tachibana (橘 日向), a character and Takemichi's girlfriend from the manga and anime series Tokyo Revengers.
- Hinata Uesato (上里 ひなた), a character and Wakaba's best friend in Nogi Wakaba is a Hero.
- Hinata Wakaba (ひなた), a character from the Rival Schools fighting game series.

=== Surname ===
- The Hinata family (日向) from the manga and anime series Sgt. Frog.
- Oboro Hinata (日向), a character from the Ninpuu Sentai Hurricaneger.

==== Male ====
- Hajime Hinata (日向), the protagonist of the video game Danganronpa 2: Goodbye Despair.
- Hideki Hinata (日向), a character from the anime Angel Beats!.
- Shōyō Hinata (日向), the main character of Haikyū!! with the position of middle blocker from Karasuno High.

==== Female ====
- Ema Hinata (朝日奈), the main character of the novel Brothers Conflict.
- Himawari Hinata (日向), the main character of the anime series Himawari!.
- Hinata-sō (ひなた荘, Hinata House), a fictional all-girls' dormitory in the Kanagawa Prefecture from the anime and manga Love Hina.
- Kaho Hinata (日向), a character of the manga and anime Blend-S
- Koharu Hinata, a character in the video game Yandere Simulator
- Natsu Hinata (日向 夏), the younger sister of Shōyō Hinata in Haikyū!!.
