= Ruben Villa =

American boxer

Personal information
- Nickname: RV4
- Nationality: American
- Born: April 16, 1997 (age 29) Salinas, California, U.S.
- Height: 5 ft 6 in (168 cm)
- Weight: Featherweight; Super-featherweight

Boxing career
- Reach: 66 1/2 in (169 cm)
- Stance: Southpaw

Boxing record
- Total fights: 24
- Wins: 22
- Win by KO: 7
- Losses: 2

Ruben Villa (born April 16, 1997) is an American professional boxer. As an amateur he was a two-time U.S. National Golden Gloves champion.

== Amateur career ==
As an amateur, Villa compiled a record of 116–17, winning two U.S. National Golden Gloves Championships and competing at the U.S. Olympic Trials. He holds notable wins over Shakur Stevenson and Devin Haney.

== Professional career ==
Villa made his professional debut on July 29, 2016, scoring a first-round knockout (KO) victory over Gerardo Molina at the DoubleTree Hotel in Ontario, California.

After compiling a record of 10–0 (4 KOs) he defeated Marlon Olea on April 14, 2018, at the Salinas Storm House in Salinas, California, capturing the WBO Youth featherweight title by unanimous decision (UD) over eight rounds. All three judges scored the bout 80–72.

After four more wins in non-title fights, one by KO, he won his second professional title by defeating Luis Lopez-Vargas via UD on May 10, 2019, to capture the vacant WBO International featherweight title, with the judges' scorecards reading 98–92, 97–93 and 96–94. He retained the title against Enrique Vivas by UD in September followed by a UD victory against Alexei Collado in January 2020.

On July 13, 2024 in Las Vegas, Villa suffered the defeat by unanimous decision against Sulaiman Segawa.

== Professional boxing record ==
24 fights	22 wins	2 losses
By knockout	7	0
By decision	15	2

No.	Result	Record	Opponent	Type	Round, time	Date	Location	Notes
24	Loss	22–2	(Uganda) Sulaiman Segawa	UD	10	Jul 13, 2024	(United States) Palms Casino Resort, Paradise, Nevada, U.S.	Lost WBC Silver featherweight title
23	Win	22–1	(Mexico) Cristian Cruz	UD	10	Apr 13, 2024	(United States) American Bank Center, Corpus Christi, Texas, U.S.	Won vacant WBC Silver featherweight title
22	Win	21–1	(Colombia) Brandon Valdes	UD	8	Sep 15, 2023	(United States) American Bank Center, Corpus Christi, Texas, U.S.	
21	Win	20–1	(Mexico) Maickol Lopez Villagrana	KO	5 (8), 0:55	May 13, 2023	(United States) Stockton Arena, Stockton, California, U.S.	
20	Win	19–1	(Mexico) Horacio García	KO	9 (10), 1:12	Apr 15, 2022	(United States) DoubleTree Hotel, Ontario, California, U.S.	
19	Loss	18–1	(Mexico) Emanuel Navarrete	UD	12	Oct 9, 2020	(United States) MGM Grand Conference Center, Paradise, Nevada, U.S.	For vacant WBO featherweight title
18	Win	18–0	(Cuba) Alexei Collado	UD	10	Dec 21, 2019	(United States) Hirsch Memorial Coliseum, Shreveport, Louisiana, U.S.	Retained WBO International featherweight title
17	Win	17–0	(Mexico) Enrique Vivas	UD	10	Sep 20, 2019	(United States) La Hacienda Event Center, Midland, Texas, U.S.	Retained WBO International featherweight title
16	Win	16–0	(Mexico) Luis Lopez-Vargas	UD	10	May 10, 2019	(United States) Omega Products International, Corona, California, U.S.	Won vacant WBO International featherweight title
15	Win	15–0	(Colombia) Ruben Cervera	UD	8	Jan 11, 2019	(United States) StageWorks, Shreveport, Louisiana, U.S.	
14	Win	14–0	(Mexico) Miguel Carrizoza	UD	8	Oct 13, 2018	(United States) Salinas Storm House, Salinas, California, U.S.	
13	Win	13–0	(Mexico) José González	UD	8	Aug 24, 2018	(United States) Omega Products International, Corona, California, U.S.	
12	Win	12–0	(Mexico) Ricardo Torres	KO	6 (8), 2:49	Jun 30, 2018	(United States) Omega Products International, Sacramento, California, U.S.	
11	Win	11–0	(Colombia) Marlon Olea	UD	8	Apr 14, 2018	(United States) Salinas Storm House, Salinas, California, U.S.	Won vacant WBO Youth featherweight title
10	Win	10–0	(United States) Juan Sandoval	UD	6	Feb 16, 2018	(United States) DoubleTree Hotel, Ontario, California, U.S.	
9	Win	9–0	(Mexico) German Meraz	UD	6	Oct 21, 2017	(United States) Turning Stone Resort Casino, Verona, New York, U.S.	
8	Win	8–0	(Mexico) Ernesto Guerrero	UD	6	Sep 22, 2017	(United States) DoubleTree Hotel, Ontario, California, U.S.	
7	Win	7–0	(United States) Jonathan Alcantara	UD	4	Jul 1, 2017	(United States) Omega Products International, Sacramento, California, U.S.	
6	Win	6–0	(Mexico) Anthony Sanchez	KO	5 (6), 2:43	May 19, 2017	(United States) DoubleTree Hotel, Ontario, California, U.S.	
5	Win	5–0	(Puerto Rico) Luis Torres	TKO	6 (6), 1:34	Apr 14, 2017	(United States) MGM National Harbor, Oxon Hill, Maryland, U.S.	
4	Win	4–0	(Mexico) Francisco Camacho	UD	4	Feb 10, 2017	(United States) DoubleTree Hotel, Ontario, California, U.S.	
3	Win	3–0	(Mexico) Aaron Lopez	UD	4	Nov 4, 2016	(United States) Omega Products International, Corona, California, U.S.	
2	Win	2–0	(Mexico) Jose Mora	KO	1 (4), 2:31	Sep 23, 2016	(United States) DoubleTree Hotel, Ontario, California, U.S.	
1	Win	1–0	(Mexico) Gerardo Molina	KO	1 (4), 2:25	Jul 29, 2016	(United States) DoubleTree Hotel, Ontario, California, U.S.	
