= Francisco Horta =

Mexican boxer

Personal information
- Nickname: Panchito
- Born: 26 September 1993 (age 32) Campeche, Campeche, Mexico
- Height: 1.73 m (5 ft 8 in)
- Weight: Junior featherweight

Boxing career
- Reach: 183 cm (72 in)
- Stance: Orthodox

Boxing record
- Total fights: 25
- Wins: 20
- Win by KO: 10
- Losses: 4
- Draws: 1

Francisco Horta Cú (born 26 September 1993) is a Mexican professional boxer who challenged for the WBO junior featherweight title in 2019.

== Early life ==
Horta was born on 26 September 1993 in Campeche City, Campeche as the second of three brothers. He began boxing at the age of nine under the tutelage of his father, trainer Francisco Horta Collí, and made his amateur debut in the 25 kg division in a boxing exhibition at a fair. Horta later represented his state at the national level, winning a bronze medal at the 2008 Olimpiada Nacional.

== Professional career ==
Horta made his professional debut on 18 February 2011, defeating Albert Pachecho by split decision in his hometown of Campeche. He suffered defeats in his second and third fights due to being abruptly moved up to eight-round bouts. He lost a third time to Guillermo Rodríguez in 2014 before going on a 13-fight unbeaten streak, improving his record to 20–3–1.

On 7 December 2019, Horta faced Emanuel Navarrete for his WBO junior featherweight title in the main event of a Top Rank on ESPN+ card in Puebla. He was overwhelmed by the champion, and the referee waved off the fight in the fourth round in Navarrete's favor.

== Personal life ==
Horta moved to Cancún early in his professional career, initially staying in a three-by-three meter room with no bed. He is an avid road cyclist, traversing the Yucatán Peninsula from Cancún to Tenabo over a span of seven days in 2018. Horta moved to Tijuana after the trip. He has also served as a motivational speaker under a government program, talking about his journey at various schools and universities in the state of Campeche.

== Professional boxing record ==
25 fights	20 wins	4 losses
By knockout	10	1
By decision	10	3
Draws	1	

No.	Result	Record	Opponent	Type	Round, time	Date	Location	Notes
25	Loss	20–4–1	(Mexico) Emanuel Navarrete	KO	4 (12), 2:09	7 Dec 2019	Auditorio GNP Seguros, Puebla, Mexico	For WBO junior featherweight title
24	Win	20–3–1	(Mexico) Francisco Alarcón	MD	8	10 Aug 2019	Estadio Antonio R. Márquez, San Juan de los Lagos, Mexico	
23	Win	19–3–1	(Mexico) Juan Jiménez	UD	8	20 Oct 2018	Centro de Convenciones, Cozumel, Mexico	
22	Win	18–3–1	(Mexico) David Reyes	UD	8	29 Jun 2018	Grand Oasis Arena, Cancún, Mexico	
21	Win	17–3–1	(Mexico) Florentino Pérez	UD	8	17 Mar 2018	Grand Oasis Arena, Cancún, Mexico	
20	Win	16–3–1	(Mexico) Édgar Lozano	TKO	8 (8), 2:45	7 Oct 2017	Estadio 20 de Noviembre, Campeche, Mexico	
19	Win	15–3–1	(Mexico) Rodrigo Hernández	KO	4 (8), 1:44	29 Jul 2017	Auditorio del Pueblo, Durango, Mexico	
18	Win	14–3–1	(Mexico) Geovanni Zamora	KO	6 (8), 2:56	13 May 2017	Grand Oasis Arena, Cancún, Mexico	
17	Win	13–3–1	(Mexico) Francisco Hernández	KO	6 (8), 1:57	4 Feb 2017	Grand Oasis Arena, Cancún, Mexico	
16	Win	12–3–1	(Mexico) Limberg Blas	KO	1 (6), 0:45	17 Dec 2016	Grand Oasis Arena, Cancún, Mexico	
15	Win	11–3–1	(Mexico) Jesús Cupul	TKO	4 (6), 1:26	18 Jun 2016	Oasis Hotel Complex, Cancún, Mexico	
14	Draw	10–3–1	(Mexico) Marco Antonio Chablé	SD	8	4 Jun 2016	Oasis Hotel Complex, Cancún, Mexico	
13	Win	10–3	(Mexico) Denovan Salazar	MD	10	30 May 2015	Sindicato de Taxistas, Cancún, Mexico	
12	Win	9–3	(Mexico) Ricardo López	TKO	6 (6), 1:13	18 Oct 2014	Sindicato de Taxistas, Cancún, Mexico	
11	Loss	8–3	(Mexico) Guillermo Rodríguez	UD	8	2 Aug 2014	Chetumal, Mexico	
10	Win	8–2	(Mexico) Gerardo Marín	UD	6	21 Jun 2014	Oasis Hotel Complex, Cancún, Mexico	
9	Win	7–2	(Mexico) Albert Pacheco	UD	8	23 May 2014	Sindicato de Taxistas, Cancún, Mexico	
8	Win	6–2	(Mexico) José Escobar	KO	2 (6), 1:12	28 Mar 2014	Sindicato de Taxistas, Cancún, Mexico	
7	Win	5–2	(Mexico) Alfonso Torres	MD	6	21 Feb 2014	Domo de la Unidad Deportiva, Cancún, Mexico	
6	Win	4–2	(Mexico) Víctor González	KO	1 (6), 2:16	6 Dec 2013	Sindicato de Taxistas, Cancún, Mexico	
5	Win	3–2	(Mexico) Guillermo Benítez	TKO	3 (6), 2:27	8 Nov 2013	Salon Sol, Cancún, Mexico	
4	Loss	2–2	(Mexico) José Cen Torres	UD	8	3 Aug 2012	Polifuncional de la Colonia Francisco Villa Oriente, Kanasín, Mexico	
3	Loss	2–1	(Mexico) José Rubio	UD	8	31 Mar 2012	Oasis Hotel Complex, Cancún, Mexico	
2	Win	2–0	(Mexico) Ricardo Ceja	UD	6	2 Mar 2012	Polifuncional, Kanasín, Mexico	
1	Win	1–0	(Mexico) Albert Pacheco	SD	4	18 Feb 2011	Estadio 20 de Noviembre, Campeche, Mexico	
