= BMO Stadium =

Soccer stadium in Los Angeles

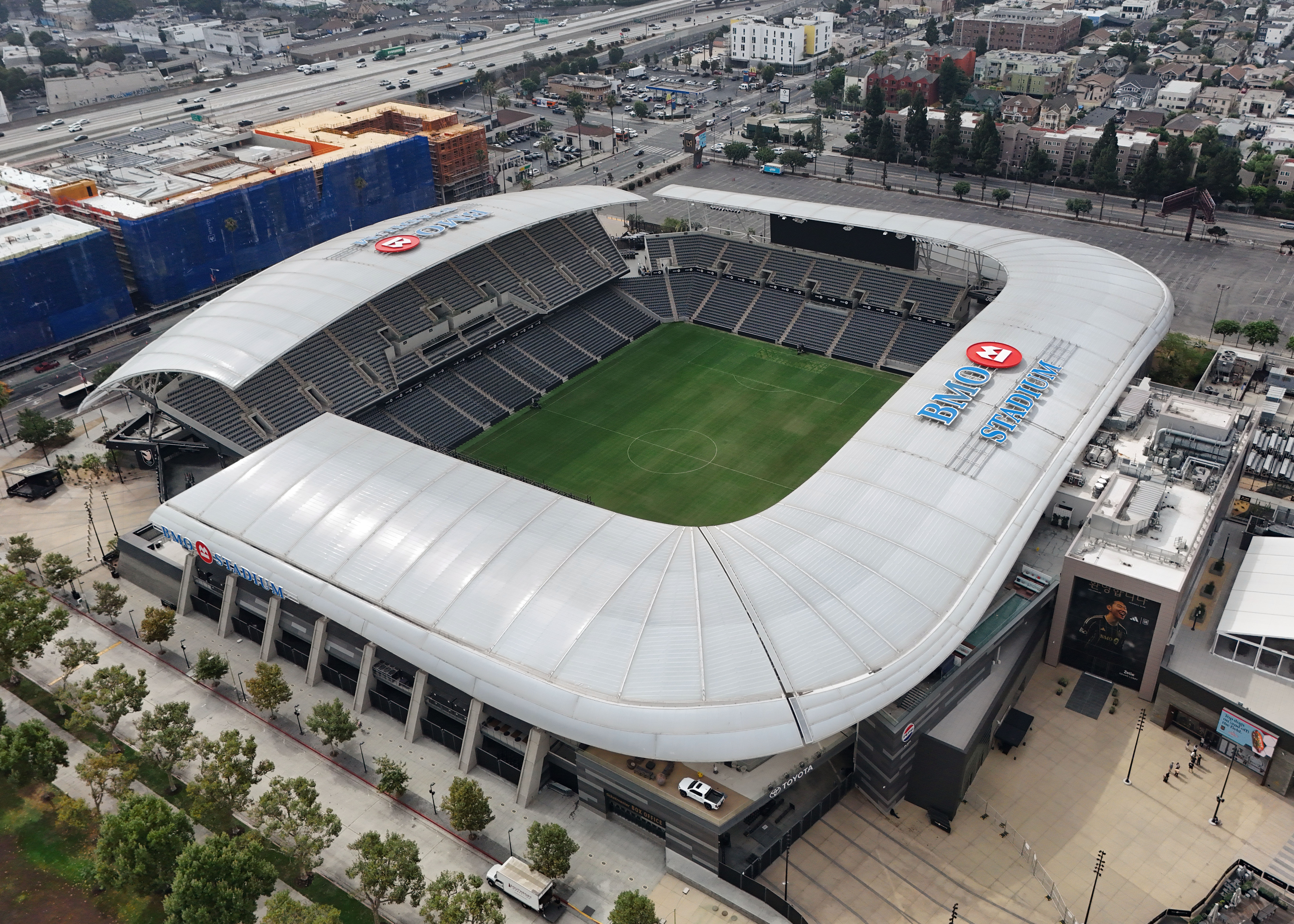
- Aerial view of the stadium in 2025

- Location in the Greater Los Angeles area Location in California Location in the United States Location in North America
- Interactive map of BMO Stadium
- Former names: Banc of California Stadium (2016–2023)
- Address: 3939 South Figueroa Street
- Location: Los Angeles, California, U.S.
- Coordinates: 34°00′46.0″N 118°17′02.7″W
- Owner: Los Angeles FC
- Capacity: 22,000 (soccer)
- Executive suites: 35
- Surface: Bermuda grass
- Scoreboard: Panasonic
- Public transit: Expo Park/USC

Construction
- Groundbreaking: August 23, 2016; 10 years ago
- Opened: April 18, 2018; 8 years ago
- Cost: $350 million
- Architect: Gensler
- Structural engineer: Thornton Tomasetti
- Services engineers: M–E Engineers, Inc.
- General contractor: PCL Construction Services, Inc.

Tenants
- Los Angeles FC (MLS) (2018–present); Angel City FC (NWSL) (2022–present)

Website
- bmostadium.com

BMO Stadium is a soccer-specific stadium in the Exposition Park neighborhood of Los Angeles, California, United States. It is the home of Major League Soccer's Los Angeles FC and the National Women's Soccer League's Angel City FC. Opened on April 18, 2018, it was the first open-air stadium built in the city of Los Angeles since Dodger Stadium in 1962.

Constructed on the site of the former Los Angeles Memorial Sports Arena inside of Exposition Park, is located next to the Los Angeles Memorial Coliseum and just south of the main campus of the University of Southern California. Los Angeles FC subleases the site from the university which has a master lease with the LA Memorial Coliseum Commission for operating and managing the Coliseum and stadium properties.

Los Angeles FC signed a 15-year, $100 million naming rights deal with Banc of California in 2016 for the stadium. The deal was terminated in 2020, with the club announcing an eventual renaming in the coming years. In 2023, BMO Bank, a subsidiary of Canadian banking company Bank of Montreal (BMO), was announced as the new stadium sponsor.

In North American competitions, the stadium is known as Los Angeles Stadium due to advertising rules.

== History ==
=== Planning and construction ===
The Los Angeles Times reported on May 17, 2015, that the team chose the Los Angeles Memorial Sports Arena site to build a 22,000-seat state-of-the-art stadium for the MLS in Exposition Park, costing $250 million. The group estimated the project would create 1,200 temporary construction jobs and 1,800 full-time jobs, generating $2.5 million in annual tax revenue. The environmental impact report, arena demolition, and stadium construction were expected to take three years and delay the team's debut to 2018.

On May 6, 2016, the Los Angeles City Council approved the stadium, clearing a way for the construction of the stadium.

A groundbreaking ceremony took place on August 23, 2016. At the event attended by owners and construction crews, LAFC announced a 15-year, $100 million naming rights deal for the stadium with the Banc of California. Demolition of the Los Angeles Memorial Sports Arena began shortly after the groundbreaking and was completed by October 2016.

=== Opening ===
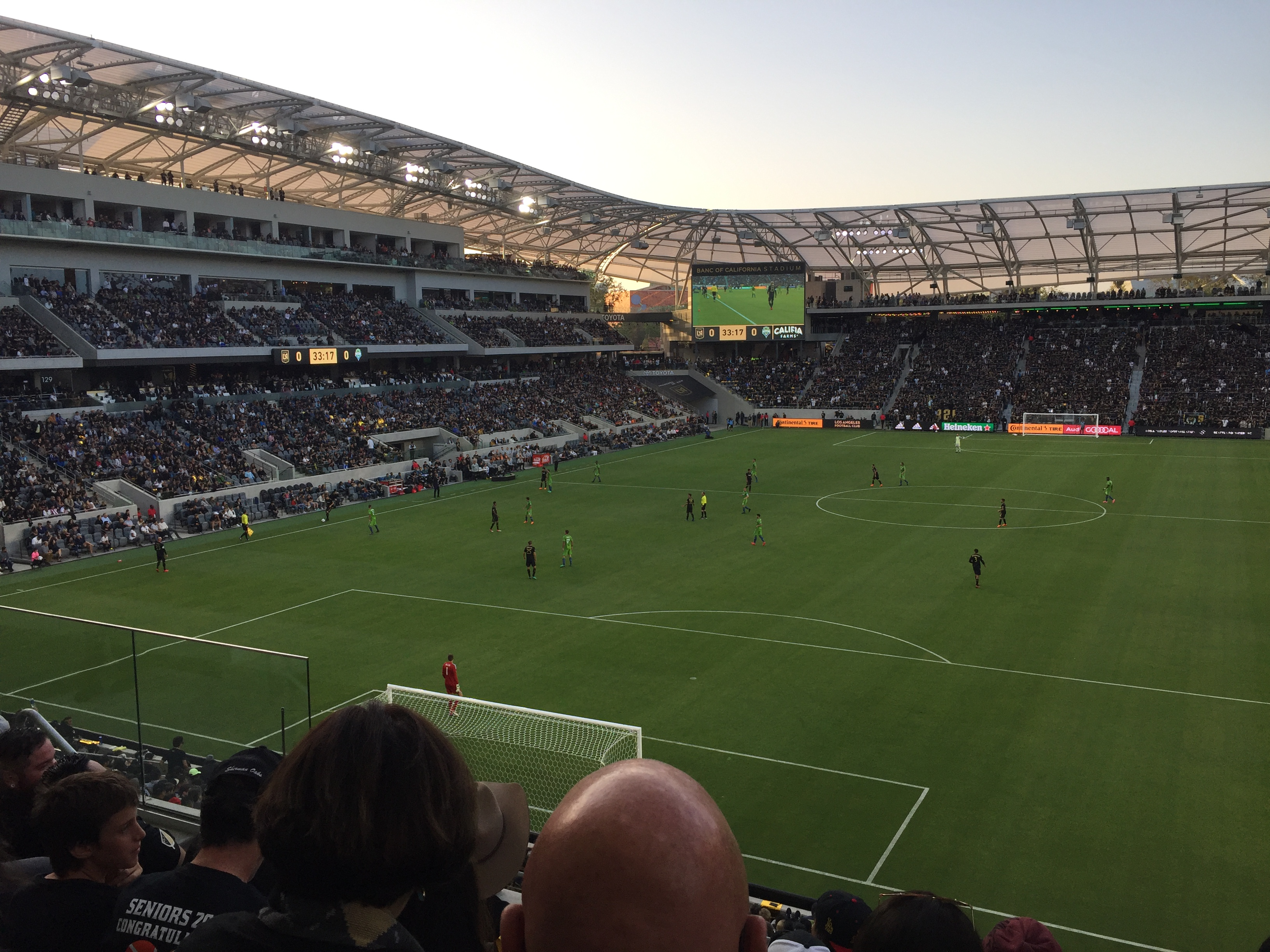
The north side during the home opener

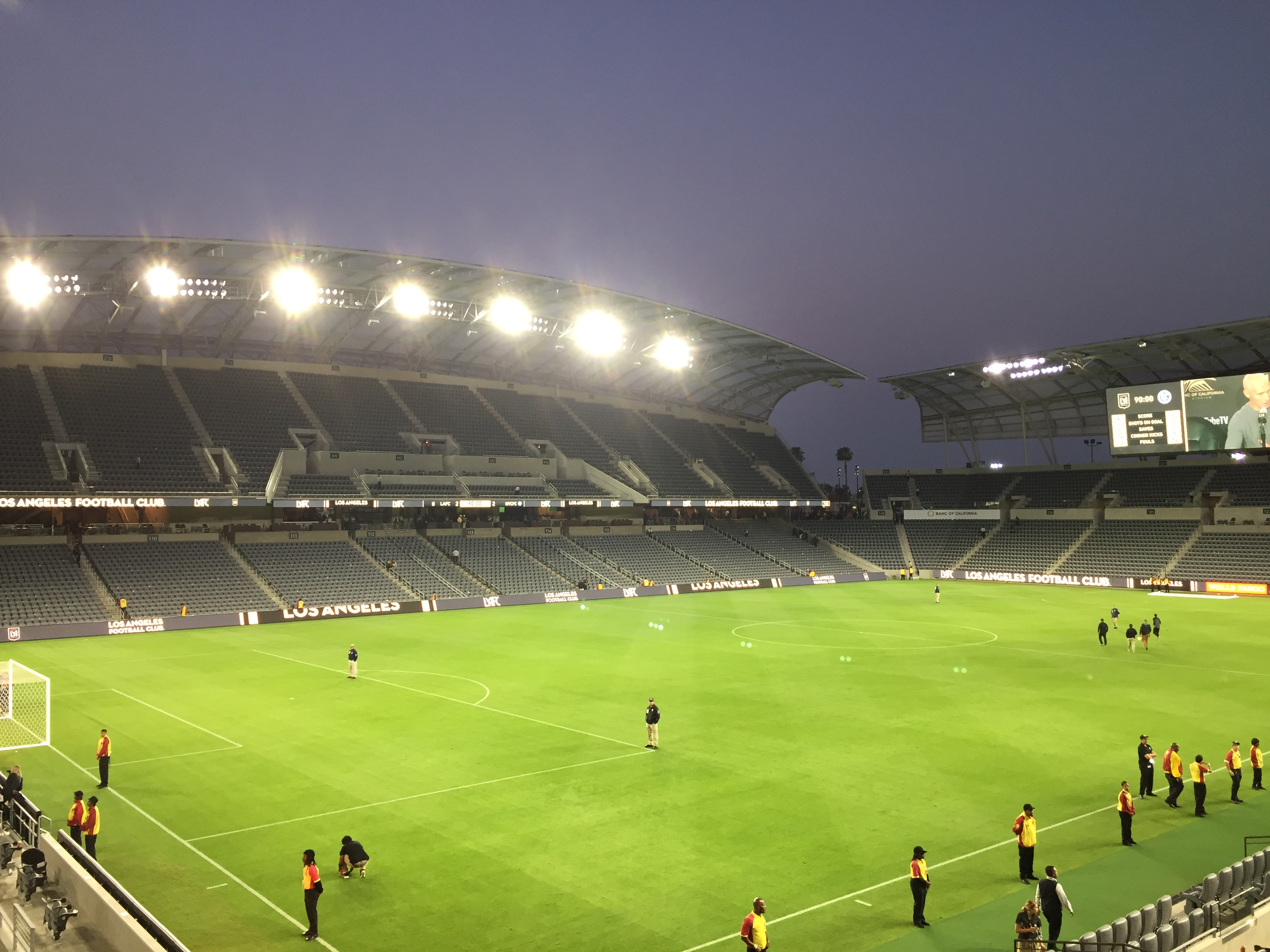
The west side stands on Figueroa Street

The first public event at the stadium was an open practice and dedication ceremony held on April 18, 2018. The club's first match was played on April 29 against Seattle Sounders FC, with the home side winning 1–0. The lone goal was scored by Laurent Ciman in stoppage time in front of a capacity crowd of 22,000.

On May 26, 2020, Banc of California announced that they planned to end the naming rights deal, paying $20 million for early termination but remaining the club's banking sponsor. The Bank of Montreal was announced as the new naming rights sponsor on January 19, 2023, shortly after acquiring the California-based Bank of the West.

In November 2020, it was announced that the newly formed Angel City FC of the National Women's Soccer League would play at the stadium.

== Features ==
=== Design ===
The seating capacity of the stadium is 22,000. The stadium's seating is at 34 degrees, which makes it among the steepest in MLS. The closest seats are 12 feet (3.7 m) from the field and all seats are within 135 feet (41 m) of the field. It includes 125,000 square feet (11,600 m^{2}) of walkways and plazas open to the public. The stadium also features press box suites with a water fountain.

The ground's North End is home to the "3252" supporters group, so named for the number of seats in the safe standing section. It was built at an incline of 34 degrees and features angled handrails that are designed to resemble those used on rollercoasters. The central section of the stand has a removable stage for use during concerts and other events outside of sports. On top of the North End is a supporter-designed bar which can only be accessed from 3252 section.

A northeast slice of the stadium was designed to be open to capture the downtown Los Angeles skyline and the San Gabriel Mountains. Members of the media in the angled press box have one of the best vantage points to peer through the "keyhole".

The roof is covered with 190,000 square feet (18,000 m^{2}) of ETFE film. The field is 86,000 square feet (8,000 m^{2}) of improved bermuda grass.

Five percent of the stadium's parking spaces have electric vehicle charging stations and 20% electric vehicle ready infrastructure. The stadium has 440 planned parking spaces for bicycles and a bike path to the stadium as part of the My Figueroa Project. The stadium is a LEED Silver certified building.

== 2028 Summer Olympics ==
The stadium will be a part of the Downtown Sports Park and host flag football and lacrosse events when Los Angeles hosts the 2028 Summer Olympics.

== Major events ==
=== Soccer ===
The stadium was a venue for the 2019 CONCACAF Gold Cup. It hosted two matches in Group C. It also hosted the 2021 MLS All-Star Game on August 25, 2021.

Date	Home team	Result	Away team	Tournament	Spectators
May 22, 2018	(United States) Los Angeles FC	1–1	(Germany) Borussia Dortmund	Club Friendly	22,000
January 31, 2019	(United States) Los Angeles FC	4–1	(Japan) Vissel Kobe	Club Friendly	18,000
March 6, 2019	El Salvador	3–1	Guatemala	International Friendly	18,342
April 7, 2019	United States	6–0	Belgium	Women's International Friendly	20,941
June 25, 2019	Jamaica	1–1	Curaçao	2019 CONCACAF Gold Cup Group C	22,503
June 25, 2019	Honduras	4–0	El Salvador	2019 CONCACAF Gold Cup Group C	22,503
January 25, 2020	(United States) Los Angeles FC	2–0	(Uruguay) Peñarol	Club Friendly	16,292
June 26, 2021	El Salvador	0–0	Guatemala	International Friendly	22,000
August 25, 2021	(United States) (Canada) MLS All-Stars	1–1 (3–2 on pens.)	(Mexico) Liga MX All-Stars	2021 MLS All-Star Game	21,000
December 11, 2021	Chile	1–0	El Salvador	International Friendly	unknown
February 23, 2022	(United States) New York City FC	4–0	(Costa Rica) Santos de Guápiles	2022 CONCACAF Champions League; Round of 16 (2nd leg)	100
November 5, 2022	(United States) Los Angeles FC	3–3 (3–0 on pens.)	(United States) Philadelphia Union	MLS Cup 2022	22,384
January 25, 2023	United States	1–2	Serbia	International Friendly	11,475
March 15, 2023	(United States) Los Angeles FC	1–2	(Costa Rica) Alajuelense	2023 CONCACAF Champions League; Round of 16 (2nd leg)	19,672
March 22, 2023	El Salvador	0–1	Honduras	International Friendly	16,000
April 11, 2023	(United States) Los Angeles FC	3–0	(Canada) Vancouver Whitecaps FC	2023 CONCACAF Champions League; Quarterfinals (2nd leg)	18,688
May 2, 2023	(United States) Los Angeles FC	3–0	(United States) Philadelphia Union	2023 CONCACAF Champions League; Semifinals (2nd leg)	19,985
June 4, 2023	(United States) Los Angeles FC	0–1	(Mexico) León	2023 CONCACAF Champions League final (2nd leg)	22,413
September 27, 2023	(United States) Los Angeles FC	0–0 (2–4 on pens.)	(Mexico) UANL	2023 Campeones Cup	20,605
March 2, 2024	Canada	1–0	Costa Rica	2024 CONCACAF W Gold Cup; Quarterfinals	2,054
March 2, 2024	Brazil	5–1	Argentina	2024 CONCACAF W Gold Cup; Quarterfinals	2,824
March 3, 2024	Mexico	3–2	Paraguay	2024 CONCACAF W Gold Cup; Quarterfinals	
March 3, 2024	United States	3–0	Colombia	2024 CONCACAF W Gold Cup; Quarterfinals	16,746
March 23, 2024	(Mexico) Guadalajara	0–0	(Mexico) Atlas	Club Friendly	
September 25, 2024	(United States) Los Angeles FC	3–1	(United States) Sporting Kansas City	2024 U.S. Open Cup final	22,214
February 11, 2025	(United States) Los Angeles FC	2–1	(Mexico) Club América	Friendly	
February 25, 2025	(United States) Los Angeles FC	1–0	(United States) Colorado Rapids	2025 CONCACAF Champions Cup; Round One (2nd leg)	17,203
March 4, 2025	(United States) Los Angeles FC	3–0	(United States) Columbus Crew	2025 CONCACAF Champions Cup; Round of 16 (1st leg)	7,285
April 2, 2025	(United States) Los Angeles FC	1–0	(United States) Inter Miami CF	2025 CONCACAF Champions Cup; Quarterfinals (1st leg)	22,207
May 31, 2025	(United States) Los Angeles FC	2–1	(Mexico) Club América	2025 FIFA Club World Cup playoff	20,714
February 24, 2026	(United States) Los Angeles FC	1–0	(Honduras) Real España	2026 CONCACAF Champions Cup; Round One (2nd leg)	7,972
March 12, 2026	(United States) Los Angeles FC	1–1	(Costa Rica) Alajuelense	2026 CONCACAF Champions Cup; Round of 16 (1st leg)	11,275
April 7, 2026	(United States) Los Angeles FC	3–0	(Mexico) Cruz Azul	2026 CONCACAF Champions Cup; Quarterfinals (1st leg)	17,521
April 29, 2026	(United States) Los Angeles FC	2–1	(Mexico) Toluca	2026 CONCACAF Champions Cup; Semifinals (1st leg)	
June 6, 2026	El Salvador	0–0	Qatar	International Friendly	

The stadium served as the "home" venue for New York City FC during the 2022 CONCACAF Champions League Round of 16 due to issues with the club's other venues in the New York metropolitan area. Their primary and secondary stadiums (Yankee Stadium and Citi Field, respectively) were not approved by CONCACAF for use in the tournament, while the soccer-specific Red Bull Arena was undergoing renovations. Banc of California Stadium was chosen due to New York City FC's upcoming MLS regular season match to be played against the LA Galaxy at the nearby Dignity Health Sports Park.

== Other sports ==
=== Rugby Union ===
It was announced on April 4, 2017, that the stadium would be host to rugby sevens tournaments. It was planned to be the permanent home of the $1M Champion Sevens organized by Grand Prix Rugby, with the first edition commencing in 2018. However, as of 2023, no rugby union games have been played at the stadium.

=== Lacrosse ===
It was announced on April 1, 2019, that the stadium would host the inaugural Premier Lacrosse League All-Star Game on July 21, 2019.

=== Boxing ===
On August 17, 2019, Banc of California Stadium held its first boxing event, a WBO junior featherweight title fight with Emanuel Navarrete successfully defending his title against Francisco De Vaca by 3rd round technical knockout. The stadium held Austin McBroom vs. AnEsonGib on September 10, 2022, a professional crossover boxing event.

The second professional boxing event to take place at the stadium was promoted by Golden Boy Promotions headlined by Gilberto 'Zurdo' Ramirez vs. Sullivan Barrera on July 9, 2021. The event also featured Joseph Diaz defeating Javier Fortuna. In the main event, Ramirez won via fourth round stoppage after dropping Barrera multiple times.

The first event at the stadium under the name of BMO Stadium took place on August 4, 2024. The main event saw Terence Crawford move up to super welterweight and defeat Israil Madrimov via unanimous decision to win the WBA world title, becoming a four-weight world champion. The event was promoted under the Riyadh Season banner and was the first to take place outside of Saudi Arabia.

=== Flag football ===
BMO Stadium hosted the Fanatics Flag Football Classic on March 21, 2026, with the event featuring current and former National Football League (NFL) players like Tom Brady, Saquon Barkley, CeeDee Lamb, Christian McCaffrey, Sauce Gardner, Myles Garrett, Brock Bowers, Maxx Crosby, Tyreek Hill, Odell Beckham Jr., and Rob Gronkowski as well as NFL coaches Pete Carroll, Sean Payton, and Kyle Shanahan.

Originally set to be held in Riyadh to close out the 2026 Riyadh Season, the event was relocated due to the ongoing war between United States and Iran which is affecting Saudi Arabia.

== Other events ==
=== Concerts ===
BMO Stadium is also designed to host concerts and other musical events. It hosted KIIS-FM's 2018 Wango Tango concert on June 2 of that year. Beck appeared in October 2018.

Mumford & Sons brought their Delta Tour to the stadium on August 3, 2019. Iron Maiden's Legacy of the Beast World Tour was announced for September 14, 2019 at the stadium as well.

The Rolling Loud hip-hop music festival was held at the stadium in 2018 and 2019. Post Malone, Lil Wayne, Cardi B, and Lil Uzi Vert, among others, performed at the 2018 show, while Chance the Rapper, Young Thug, Lil Baby, Future, A$AP Rocky, Meek Mill, YG, and Playboi Carti were part of the 2019 show.

Hard rock band Guns N' Roses played a sold-out show on August 19, 2021, as part of their We're F'N' Back! Tour. The show grossed over $3.4 million and was attended by 21,950 patrons.

Armenian American Heavy metal band System of a Down performed two shows on February 4 & 5, 2022 at the stadium with KoЯn serving as main support.

K-pop girl group Twice held the encore concert for their 4th World Tour 'III' on May 14–15, 2022. The Killers performed a sold-out show with 23,439 attendees for their Imploding the Mirage Tour on August 27. As part of their Paradise Again World Tour, EDM supergroup Swedish House Mafia played a sold-out show on September 9.

K-pop girl group Blackpink played two nights at the stadium on November 19 & 20, 2022 for their Born Pink World Tour.

In 2023, K-pop boy group Tomorrow X Together performed two sold-out shows on May 27 and 28 as part of their Act Sweet Mirage Tour. blink-182 performed at the stadium on June 16 & 17, 2023, as part of their reunion tour with Tom DeLonge. During the first show, Kourtney Kardashian revealed her pregnancy with her husband and drummer Travis Barker. Fall Out Boy and Bring Me the Horizon performed at the stadium on July 2 & 3, 2023, as part of the former band's So Much For (Tour) Dust. Hard Summer hosted part of their 2023 festival at the stadium on August 5 and 6, which included the nearby Los Angeles Memorial Coliseum and Exposition Park. Mexican group RBD is set to perform four concerts on October 18–20 and 22 as part of their reunion tour, marking the first time the group will be performing live together in 15 years. Queen + Adam Lambert are slated to play two consecutive shows, on November 11 and 12, as part of their Rhapsody Tour; the November 11 show sold-out within an hour of tickets going on-sale, which led to the November 12 date being added.

On July 20 and 21, 2024, ATEEZ held two sold-out shows at the venue for their Towards The Light: Will To Power world tour. KoЯn performed a special 30th anniversary show at the stadium on October 5, 2024, with Evanescence, Gojira, among others opening the show.

In 2024, K-pop boy group Seventeen performed two sold-out shows on November 9 and November 10 as part of their Right Here World Tour.

In 2025, J-Hope of BTS performed two shows on April 4 and April 6 as part of his Hope on the Stage Tour. Tomorrow X Together performed one show on September 9 of their Act: Tomorrow Tour. Twenty One Pilots will conclude The Clancy World Tour on October 25 & 26 at the stadium.

Latin Pop superstar Gloria Trevi is scheduled to perform a special one-night only concert on February 28, 2026, promoted as "Live Celebration" to celebrate her 58th birthday. Tickets sale started December 5 with no pre-sales. As of December 2025, this is Trevi's only 2026 show in the United States and her first ever headlining concert in the Stadium. No opening acts have been announced to join Trevi on this special event.

Metal band Iron Maiden is scheduled to bring their Run for Your Lives World Tour for two nights on September 25 and 27, 2026 with special guests Megadeth and Anthrax. The second show (September 27) was later announced due to overwhelming demand after the first show completely sold-out.

=== Cultural events ===
LAFC has stated that the stadium would be used for local cultural events in Los Angeles's 9th District.

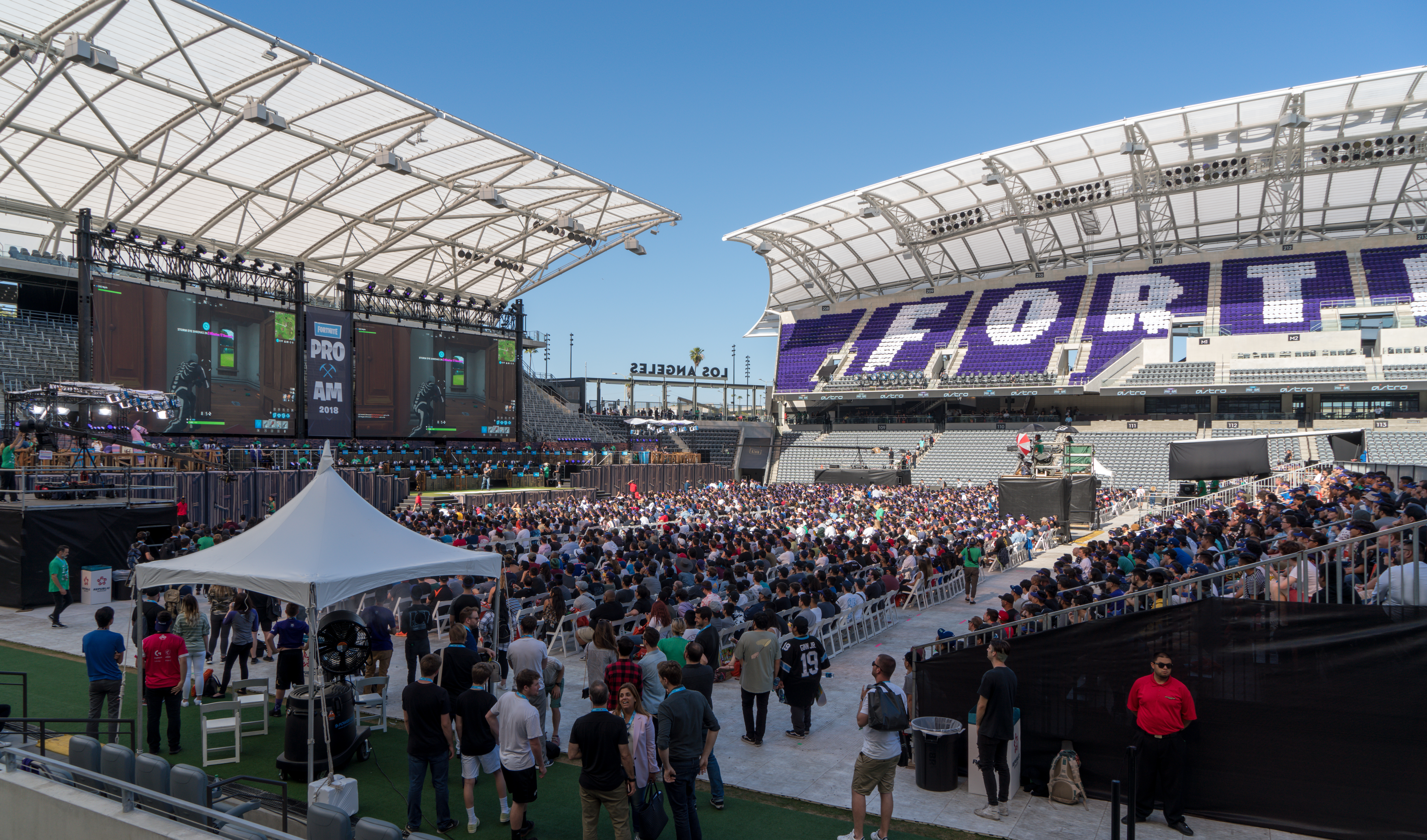
Fortnite Pro-Am event at BMO Stadium.

=== Esports ===
In June 2018, Epic Games held a celebrity pro-am event for its multiplayer online video game Fortnite Battle Royale at Banc of California Stadium, as part of events coinciding with the 2018 Electronic Entertainment Expo (E3). The event was won by a team of professional player Ninja and electronic music producer Marshmello.

== See also ==
- List of soccer stadiums in the United States
- Lists of stadiums

Events and tenants
Preceded by First stadium	Home of Los Angeles FC; 2018–present	Succeeded by Current
