= Horacio García =

Mexican boxer (born 1990)

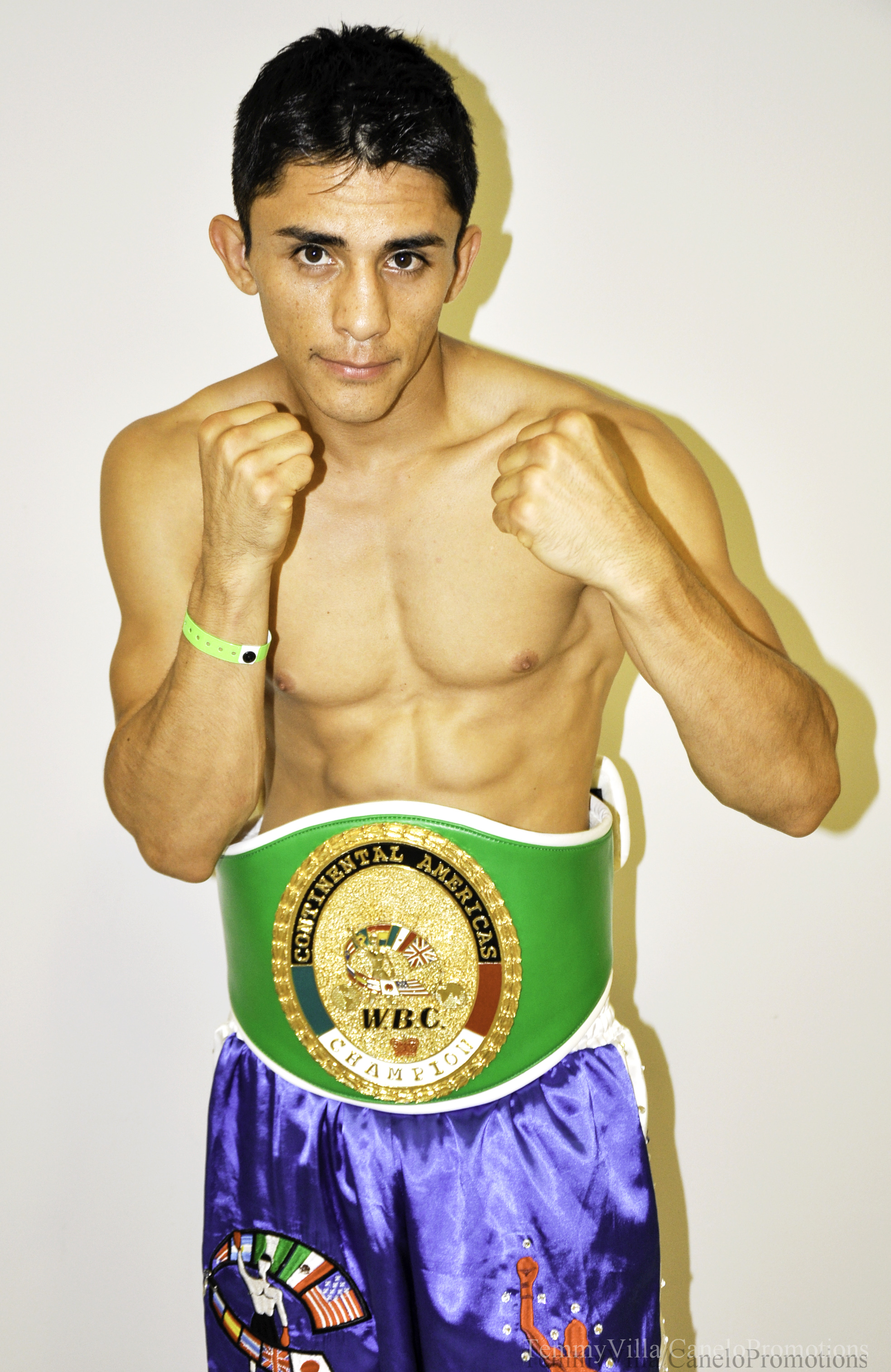

Personal information
- Nickname: Violento
- Born: Horacio García Cervantes Soto; 27 June 1990 (age 36) Guadalajara, Jalisco, Mexico
- Height: 1.74 m (5 ft 9 in)
- Weight: Super Bantamweight

Boxing career
- Reach: 178 cm (70 in)
- Stance: Orthodox

Boxing record
- Total fights: 42
- Wins: 35
- Win by KO: 25
- Losses: 6
- Draws: 1
- No contests: 0

Horacio García Cervantes Soto (born 27 June 1990) is a former Mexican professional boxer and WBC Continental Americas super bantamweight champion.

== Professional career ==
Garcia won his opening 29 professional contests before losing a unanimous decision in May 2015 against former world title-holder Hozumi Hasegawa.

On November 12, 2010, García beat veteran fighter Lisandro de Los Santos to win the WBC Youth World super bantamweight championship.

Since Garcia's first defeat in 2015, he suffered six subsequent losses and faced one draw; the first in 2016 to featherweight prospect Joseph Diaz. The second, controversially, in 2017 to Diuhl Olguin. However, two months on from his loss to Olguin, Garcia won a rematch by TKO at the MGM Grand, Marquee Ballroom, Las Vegas. He faced former two-weight world champion Carl Frampton in 2017, losing via unanimous decision.

A comeback fight in 2018 saw Garcia beat Orlando Guerrero in Domo del Parque San Rafael, Guadalajara. He faced defeat again however to Isaac Zarate in a controversial split decision later that year before rematching Zarate in 2022, winning via majority decision. Later in 2022, Garcia lost for a final time to Ruben Villa when an accidental head-butt closed the fight in round nine.

He has since been inactive from the sport earning 35 wins.

=== 2017 ===
In November 2017, García faced former two-weight world champion Carl Frampton. Garcia was considered by many as an easy stepping stone for Frampton who fought García in a billed 'comeback' bout after suffering his first defeat in January 2017 to Léo Santa Cruz. However, Garcia took Frampton to the 10th round in a close contest. Garcia ultimately lost on points in a unanimous decision. Frampton said of the fight "It was my fault, I picked García - nobody else" in response to García's head-turning performance.

=== 2018 ===
In June 2018, García beat journeyman Orlando Guerrero by corner-stoppage. In September of the same year, he faced American prospect Isaac Zarate, losing via split decision at the Hard Rock Hotel and Casino, Las Vegas; a fight promoted by Oscar De La Hoya.

=== 2022 ===
In February 2022, García faced Isaac Zarate for a second time in an anticipated redemption rematch at the DoubleTree Hotel, Ontario, California. He won via majority decision, retiring Zarate from professional boxing. In April of the same year, García fought highly rated featherweight Ruben Villa, losing via stoppage when an accidental headbutt cut his left eye in round one. The stoppage was ruled a KO under California rules.

==== Frampton vs. García ====
At the official press conference of the promotional announcement, it was announced that Carl Frampton would fight an unnamed opponent on 18 November 2017 in Belfast at the SSE Arena. According to promoter Frank Warren, this would pave the way for a world title fight at Windsor Park in May/June 2018. On 4 October, it was confirmed that Frampton would fight Mexican boxer Horacio García in a 10-round bout. Speaking about the fight, Frampton said, “I asked for a ten-round fight. I would have been happy to be doing twelve rounds but speaking to my team after the bad year I’ve had and the long layoff they thought it was only fair to come back with a ten rounder before we target the big names.” This would mark Frampton's first fight in Belfast since February 2015, when he made his first defence of the IBF super-bantamweight title.

The three judges' scored the fight 98–93, 97-93 and 98–93. Frampton started off strong however ring rust became an issue. From round 4, García repeatedly trapped Frampton against the ropes and worked him over with body shots. In round 7, García dropped Frampton with a left hook. Referee Victor Loughlin, who was stood behind Frampton when the punch landed, started to count. From Loughlin's point of view, it was a punch that dropped Frampton. Replays showed that it could have been ruled a legitimate slip. Frampton admitted he let himself get into a battle. He said, "I thought it was a good fight and everyone would have enjoyed that more than me. I was boxing lovely at the start then I let him drag me into a fight. I wanted it to be a hard fight, that has got the rust off, the cobwebs have gone and I want one of the big boys. I will let the team decide who I fight next."

== Professional boxing record ==
42 fights	35 wins	6 losses
By knockout	25	1
By decision	10	5
Draws	1	

No.	Result	Record	Opponent	Type	Round, time	Date	Location	Notes
42	Loss	35–6–1	Ruben Villa	KO	9 (10), 1:12	15 Apr 2022	DoubleTree Hotel, Ontario, California, U.S.	
41	Win	35–5–1	Isaac Zarate	MD	8	18 Feb 2022	DoubleTree Hotel, Ontario, California, U.S.	
40	Loss	34–5–1	Isaac Zarate	SD	8	13 Sep 2018	Hard Rock Hotel and Casino, Paradise, Nevada, U.S.	
39	Win	34–4–1	Orlando Guerrero	RTD	5 (10), 3:00	23 Jun 2018	Domo del Parque San Rafael, Guadalajara, Mexico	
38	Loss	33–4–1	Carl Frampton	UD	10	18 Nov 2017	The SSE Arena, Belfast, Northern Ireland	
37	Win	33–3–1	Diuhl Olguin	TKO	4 (8), 0:44	15 Sep 2017	Marquee Ballroom, Paradise, Nevada, U.S.	
36	Loss	32–3–1	Diuhl Olguin	UD	8	15 July 2017	The Forum, Inglewood, California, U.S.	
35	Win	32–2–1	Fernando Vargas Parra	MD	8	5 May 2017	MGM Grand Garden Arena, Paradise, Nevada, U.S.	
34	Win	31–2–1	Josue Veraza	TKO	5 (10), 0:50	4 Mar 2017	Arena Jalisco, Guadalajara, Mexico	
33	Loss	30–2–1	Joseph Diaz	UD	10	17 Dec 2016	The Forum, Inglewood, California, U.S.	For WBC-NABF featherweight title
32	Draw	30–1–1	Erik Ruiz	SD	10	6 May 2016	Toshiba Plaza, Paradise, Nevada, U.S.	For vacant WBC-NABF super bantamweight title
31	Win	30–1	Raúl Hidalgo	TKO	2 (8), 1:03	20 Nov 2015	The Joint, Paradise, Nevada, U.S.	
30	Loss	29–1	Hozumi Hasegawa	UD	10	9 May 2015	Central Gym, Kobe, Japan	
29	Win	29–0	José Cen Torres	KO	1 (10), 0:30	21 Feb 2015	Centro de Espectaculos, Epazoyucan, Mexico	Retained WBC Continental Americas super bantamweight title
28	Win	28–0	José Silveria	TKO	5 (10)	29 Nov 2014	Modulo Comude, San Miguel de Allende, Mexico	Retained WBC Continental Americas super bantamweight title
27	Win	27–0	Jonathan Pérez	TKO	5 (12), 2:06	16 Aug 2014	Centro de Convenciones Azul, Ixtapa-Zihuatanejo, Mexico	Retained WBC Continental Americas super bantamweight title
26	Win	26–0	Javier Morales	RTD	2 (8), 1:02	10 May 2014	Arena Solidaridad, Monterrey, Mexico	
25	Win	25–0	Fernando Lumacad	TKO	1 (10)	18 Jan 2014	Complejo Panamericano, Guadalajara, Mexico	Won vacant WBC Continental Americas super bantamweight title
24	Win	24–0	Cesár Saucedo	TKO	2 (8), 1:39	4 Jan 2014	Polideportivo Río de Janeiro, Guadalajara, Mexico	
23	Win	23–0	Cesár Rojas	UD	10	3 Aug 2013	Deportivo Agustín Ramos Millan, Toluca, Mexico	
22	Win	22–0	Orlando Guerrero	TKO	4 (10), 1:52	25 May 2013	Domo de la Feria, León, Mexico	
21	Win	21–0	Jairo Ochoa Martínez	UD	6	24 Nov 2012	Foro Polanco, Mexico City, Mexico	
20	Win	20–0	Noe Martínez Raygoza	KO	9 (10), 0:40	5 Oct 2012	Arena Jalisco, Guadalajara, Mexico	
19	Win	19–0	Adolfo Landeros	UD	10	14 Jul 2012	Citizens Business Bank Arena, Ontario, California, U.S.	Retained WBC Youth super bantamweight title
18	Win	18–0	José de Jesús	UD	8	14 Apr 2012	Arandas Municipal Auditorium, Arandas, Mexico	
17	Win	17–0	Edgar Martínez	TKO	5 (10), 0:43	19 Nov 2011	Gimnasio German Evers, Mazatlán, Mexico	
16	Win	16–0	Germán Meraz	PTS	10	24 Sep 2011	Foro Polanco, Mexico City, Mexico	
15	Win	15–0	Ramón Camargo	UD	10	18 Jun 2011	Arena VFG, Guadalajara, Mexico	Retained WBC Youth super bantamweight title
14	Win	14–0	Ricardo Carmona	TKO	2 (10), 0:41	13 May 2011	Arena Jalisco, Guadalajara, Mexico	
13	Win	13–0	Lisandro de los Santos	KO	4 (10), 2:24	5 Feb 2011	Arena Jalisco, Guadalajara, Mexico	Won vacant WBC Youth super bantamweight title
12	Win	12–0	Jesús Romero	RTD	6 (8), 3:00	10 Dec 2010	Arena Jalisco, Guadalajara, Mexico	
11	Win	11–0	Hugo Lorenzo	RTD	9 (12), 3:00	3 Sep 2010	Arena Jalisco, Guadalajara, Mexico	Won vacant Jalisco State super bantamweight title
10	Win	10–0	Emanuel Alba	TKO	1 (8), 1:14	13 Aug 2010	Arena Jalisco, Guadalajara, Mexico	
9	Win	9–0	Víctor Valencia	KO	4 (6), 1:25	10 Jul 2010	Arena VFG, Guadalajara, Mexico	
8	Win	8–0	Luis Ángel Hernández	KO	2 (8)	29 May 2010	Arena Tecate, Guadalajara, Mexico	
7	Win	7–0	Víctor Orozco	TKO	4 (6), 1:59	12 Mar 2010	Arena Jalisco, Guadalajara, Mexico	
6	Win	6–0	Roberto Morales	TKO	1 (6), 2:38	3 Oct 2009	Coliseo Olimpico de la UG, Guadalajara, Mexico	
5	Win	5–0	Saturnino Mora	UD	6	8 Aug 2009	Auditorio Benito Juárez, Zapopan, Mexico	
4	Win	4–0	Silvestre Márquez	TKO	2 (6)	5 Jun 2009	Palenque Calle 2, Zapopan, Mexico	
3	Win	3–0	Víctor Orozco	TKO	2 (4)	5 Jun 2009	Palenque Calle 2, Zapopan, Mexico	
2	Win	2–0	Víctor Orozco	SD	4	21 Feb 2009	Auditorio Benito Juárez, Zapopan, Mexico	
1	Win	1–0	Juan Gómez	TKO	3 (4)	17 Oct 2008	Auditorio Benito Juarez, Guadalajara, Mexico	
