= Reiya Abe =

Japanese boxer (born 1993)

Reiya Abe 阿部麗也
Personal information
- Nationality: Japanese
- Born: 25 March 1993 (age 33) Yama District, Fukushima, Japan
- Height: 5 ft 7.5 in (171 cm)
- Weight: Featherweight; Super-featherweight

Boxing career
- Reach: 69 in (175 cm)
- Stance: Southpaw

Boxing record
- Total fights: 33
- Wins: 27
- Win by KO: 10
- Losses: 4
- Draws: 2

Reiya Abe (Japanese: 阿部麗也, Abe Reiya; born 25 March 1993) is a Japanese professional boxer.

== Professional career ==
=== Early career ===
==== Rookie of the Year tournament ====
Abe made his professional debut against Tetsuya Hirokawa on 2 June 2013. He won the fight by unanimous decision. After suffering his first professional loss to Koki Kobayashi by unanimous decision on 29 July 2013, Abe won his next four fights to qualify for the featherweight event of the East Japan Rookie of the year tournament. Abe faced the undefeated Haruka Itakura in the tournament semifinals on 25 September 2014. He won the fight by a second-round technical knockout. Advancing to the East Japan Rookie of the Year tournament finals, which were held on 2 November 2014, Abe faced Naoto Moriya (6–1–1). He won the fight by a first-round knockout. He was awarded the "Fighting Award" at the post-fight ceremony.

Abe was booked to face the West Japan featherweight Rookie of the Year Kyohei Tonomoto (5–1) on 21 December 2014 in the featherweight All Japan Rookie of the Year deciding match. He won the fight by unanimous decision. Two of the judges scored the bout 49–45 in his favor, while the third judge awarded Abe a 49–46 scorecard.

==== Rise up the ranks ====
After winning the All Japan Rookie title, Abe faced the twelve fight veteran Shingo Kusano. He lost the fight by majority decision, with scores of 58–57, 58–57 and 57–57. Abe rebounded by winning his next three fights (against Ryo Hino, Rokuhei Suzuki and Hikaru Marugame), before rematching Shingo Kusano on 19 July 2016. He avenged his second professional loss by technical knockout, stopping Kusano in the fifth round. Abe faced Tsuyoshi Tameda on 17 October 2016, in his final fight of the year. He won the bout by an eight-round technical knockout.

Abe faced the WBC-ABC super featherweight champion Joe Noynay in a featherweight non-title bout on 28 February 2017. He won the fight by unanimous decision, with scores of 78–75, 77–75 and 77–76. Eight months later, on 2 October 2017, Abe faced the more experienced Satoshi Hosono. He won the fight by technical decision, with scores of 89–83, 90–81 and 89–83. The bout was stopped early in the ninth round, due to a cut above Hosono's right eye, which was caused by an accidental clash of heads.

Abe faced Daisuke Watanabe on 2 March 2018, in his first fight of the year. He won the fight by unanimous decision, with scores of 78–75, 78–75 and 79–73. After beating Masashi Noguchi in a stay-busy fight by a sixth-round stoppage on 1 September 2018, Abe was booked to face the unbeaten Daisuke Sugita in a Japanese title eliminator on 19 January 2019. He won the fight by unanimous decision, with one judge scoring the fight 79–71 for him, while the remaining two judges gave him all eight rounds of the bout.

Abe challenged the reigning Japanese featherweight champion Taiki Minamoto on 1 May 2019, in the main event of "Dangan 223" which took place at the Korakuen Hall. The fight was ruled a majority draw. Two judges scored the fight as an even 94–94 draw, while the third judge scored the fight 95–94 for Abe. Following this fight, Minamoto vacated the featherweight title. As such, the #2 ranked Japanese featherweight contender Abe was scheduled to face the #1 ranked contender Ryo Sagawa for the vacant belt on 13 September 2019. Sagawa won the fight by unanimous decision, with one judge scoring the fight 96–95 for him, while the remaining two judges scored the fight 96–94 for Sagawa.

Abe faced the undefeated Ren Sasaki on 13 October 2020, following a thirteen-month absence from the sport. He successfully rebounded from his two failed title bids with a unanimous decision victory. Two of the judges scored the fight 78–74 for Abe, while the third judge scored the fight 77–75 in his favor. Abe next faced Koshin Takeshima on 21 April 2021. He won the fight by technical decision, with scores of 67–64, 68–63 and 67–64. Abe next faced Daisuke Watanabe on 27 November 2021. He won the fight by a third-round stoppage, as Watanabe's corner opted to retire their fighter at the end of the round.

=== WBO Asia Pacific featherweight champion ===
Abe challenged the incumbent Japanese featherweight champion Hinata Maruta, in what was Maruta's second title defense, on 15 May 2022. The bout was scheduled as the event headliner for "Dangan 250", which took place at the Sumida City Gymnasium in Tokyo, Japan. Aside from the Japanese title, the vacant WBO Asia Pacific featherweight belt was on the line as well. He utilized outfighting tactics to outbox Maruta for the majority of the fight, en route to winning it by unanimous decision, with scores of 118–109, 116–111 and 115–112. On August 19, 2022, the Japanese Boxing Association named him their "Fighter of the Year".

Abe made the first defense of his Japanese and WBO Asia Pacific titles against the undefeated Jinki Maeda on 3 December 2022. He won the fight by majority decision, with two judges scoring the bout 117–111 and 116–112 for him, while the third judge had in an even 114–114 draw. Abe was named the December 2022 "Fighter of the Month" by the East Japan Boxing Association following this victory.

On 13 January 2023, the IBF ordered a final featherweight title eliminator between Abe and the former two-weight world champion Kiko Martínez. Abe vacated the Japanese featherweight title on the same day. The title eliminator bout was booked to take place on 8 April 2023, at the Ariake Arena in Ariake, Tokyo. He won the fight by unanimous decision, with two scorecards of 119–109 and one scorecard of 117–111.

==== Abe vs. Lopez ====
Abe was scheduled to challenge Luis Alberto Lopez for IBF featherweight title on March 2, 2024, in Verona, New York. He lost the fight via eighth-round TKO.

== Professional boxing record ==
33 fights	27 wins	4 losses
By knockout	10	1
By decision	17	3
Draws	2	

No.	Result	Record	Opponent	Type	Round, time	Date	Location	Notes
33	Win	27–4–2	Yuya Oku	UD	10	19 Jun 2025	Ota City General Gymnasium, Tokyo, Japan	Won vacant Japanese featherweight title
32	Draw	26–4–2	Satoshi Shimizu	MD	10	25 Mar 2025	Korakuen Hall, Tokyo, Japan	
31	Win	26–4–1	Hibiki Kawamoto	UD	10	18 Oct 2024	Korakuen Hall, Tokyo, Japan	
30	Loss	25–4–1	Luis Alberto Lopez	TKO	8 (12), 0:39	2 Mar 2024	Turning Stone Resort & Casino, Verona, New York, U.S.	For IBF featherweight title
29	Win	25–3–1	Kiko Martínez	UD	12	8 Apr 2023	Ariake Arena, Tokyo, Japan	
28	Win	24–3–1	Jinki Maeda	MD	12	3 Dec 2022	Korakuen Hall, Tokyo, Japan	Retained Japanese and WBO Asia Pacific featherweight titles
27	Win	23–3–1	Hinata Maruta	UD	12	15 May 2022	Sumida Ward General Gymnasium, Sumida, Tokyo, Japan	Won Japanese featherweight and vacant WBO Asia Pacific featherweight titles
26	Win	22–3–1	Daisuke Watanabe	RTD	3 (8), 3:00	27 Nov 2021	Korakuen Hall, Tokyo, Japan	
25	Win	21–3–1	Koshin Takeshima	TD	7 (8), 2:42	21 Apr 2021	Korakuen Hall, Tokyo, Japan	
24	Win	20–3–1	Ren Sasaki	UD	8	13 Oct 2020	Korakuen Hall, Tokyo, Japan	
23	Loss	19–3–1	Ryo Sagawa	UD	10	13 Sep 2019	Korakuen Hall, Tokyo, Japan	For Japanese featherweight title
22	Draw	19–2–1	Taiki Minamoto	MD	10	1 May 2019	Korakuen Hall, Tokyo, Japan	For Japanese featherweight title
21	Win	19–2	Daisuke Sugita	UD	8	19 Jan 2019	Korakuen Hall, Tokyo, Japan	
20	Win	18–2	Masashi Noguchi	TKO	6 (8), 2:25	1 Sep 2018	Korakuen Hall, Tokyo, Japan	
19	Win	17–2	Daisuke Watanabe	UD	8	2 Mar 2018	Korakuen Hall, Tokyo, Japan	
18	Win	16–2	Methawin Kemthong	TKO	1 (8), 1:10	17 Dec 2017	Shinjuku FACE, Tokyo, Japan	
17	Win	15–2	Satoshi Hosono	TD	9 (10), 0:57	2 Oct 2017	Korakuen Hall, Tokyo, Japan	
16	Win	14–2	Joe Noynay	UD	8	28 Feb 2017	Korakuen Hall, Tokyo, Japan	
15	Win	13–2	Tsuyoshi Tameda	TKO	8 (8), 0:52	17 Oct 2016	Korakuen Hall, Tokyo, Japan	
14	Win	12–2	Shingo Kusano	TKO	5 (8), 1:47	19 Jul 2016	Korakuen Hall, Tokyo, Japan	
13	Win	11–2	Hikaru Marugame	UD	8	17 Mar 2016	Korakuen Hall, Tokyo, Japan	
12	Win	10–2	Rokuhei Suzuki	TKO	6 (6), 1:21	22 Nov 2015	Shinjuku FACE, Tokyo, Japan	
11	Win	9–2	Ryo Hino	UD	6	8 Aug 2015	Korakuen Hall, Tokyo, Japan	
10	Loss	8–2	Shingo Kusano	MD	6	17 Mar 2015	Korakuen Hall, Tokyo, Japan	
9	Win	8–1	Kyohei Tonomoto	UD	5	21 Dec 2014	Korakuen Hall, Tokyo, Japan	Won All Japan Rookie of the Year title
8	Win	7–1	Naoto Moriya	KO	1 (5), 1:53	2 Nov 2014	Korakuen Hall, Tokyo, Japan	Won East Japan Rookie of the Year title
7	Win	6–1	Haruka Itakura	TKO	2 (4), 1:34	25 Sep 2014	Korakuen Hall, Tokyo, Japan	
6	Win	5–1	Yuichi Katayama	UD	4	24 Jul 2014	Korakuen Hall, Tokyo, Japan	
5	Win	4–1	Soreike Taichi	KO	1 (4), 1:59	8 May 2014	Korakuen Hall, Tokyo, Japan	
4	Win	3–1	Takeshi Yamagata	TKO	2 (4), 1:56	1 Apr 2014	Korakuen Hall, Tokyo, Japan	
3	Win	2–1	Tasuku Nakagawa	UD	4	8 Dec 2013	Shinjuku FACE, Tokyo, Japan	
2	Loss	1–1	Koki Kobayashi	UD	4	29 Jul 2013	Korakuen Hall, Tokyo, Japan	
1	Win	1–0	Tetsuya Hirokawa	UD	4	2 Jun 2013	City Sogo Gym, Chigasaki, Japan	
