= Joet Gonzalez =

American boxer (born 1993)

Personal information
- Born: Joet De Jesus Gonzalez; 12 October 1993 (age 33) Glendora, California, U.S.
- Height: 5 ft 6 in (168 cm)
- Weight: Featherweight

Boxing career
- Reach: 70 in (178 cm)
- Stance: Orthodox

Boxing record
- Total fights: 32
- Wins: 27
- Win by KO: 15
- Losses: 5
Medal record
Men's amateur boxing
Representing United States
U.S. National Championships
Gold medal – first place	2012 Fort Carson	Featherweight
Silver medal – second place	2011 Colorado Springs	Featherweight

Joet De Jesus Gonzalez (born 12 October 1993) is an American professional boxer.

== Amateur career ==
As an amateur, Gonzalez defeated Gervonta Davis twice by UD

== Professional boxing career ==
=== Early career ===
Gonzalez made his professional debut against Jesus Carmona on 7 July 2012, winning by unanimous decision. Gonzalez amassed an 18–0 record during the next six years, with eleven stoppage victories, before challenging for his first regional title.

Gonzalez had his first major step-up in competition when faced Rafael Rivera (25–1–2) for the vacant WBO-NABO featherweight title. The bout headlined an ESPN broadcast card, which took place at The Novo in Los Angeles, California. He won the fight by split decision. Two judges scored the fight 97–93 and 96–94 for Gonzalez, while the third judge scored it 96–94 for Rivera. Gonzalez made his first regional title defense against the former IBF super flyweight champion Rodrigo Guerrero on 30 March 2019, on the undercard of the Ángel Acosta and Ganigan Lopez light flyweight title bout. He retained the belt with a fifth-round knockout of Guerrero, after knocking him down in both the first and fourth round.

Gonzalez was booked to face Manuel Avila for the vacant WBA Continental and WBO Global featherweight titles on 13 July 2019. He won the fight by a sixth-round knockout, as Avila's corner decided to throw in the towel at the 2:27 minute mark of the round.

=== World title fights ===
==== Gonzalez vs. Stevenson ====
On 6 August 2019, the WBO ordered a fight between Gonzalez and Shakur Stevenson for the featherweight title, which was left vacant after Óscar Valdez moved up to junior lightweight. The two camps were given a thirty-day period to negotiate the terms of the bout, with Gonzalez being represented by Golden Boy Promotions, with whom he had signed a new promotional deal. The title fight was officially announced on 13 September 2019. It was booked as the event headliner of an ESPN broadcast card, which took place at the Reno-Sparks Convention Center in Reno, Nevada. Gonzalez entered the fight as a +375 underdog, while most odds-makers had Stevenson a -500 favorite. Gonzalez lost the fight by unanimous decision, with all three judges scoring the fight 119–109 for Stevenson and awarding Gonzalez only the seventh round.

==== Gonzalez vs. Marriaga ====
Following his failed title bid, Gonzalez was booked to face the former WBO featherweight and junior lightweight title challenger Miguel Marriaga for the WBO Inter-Continental featherweight belt. The bout took place on 12 September 2020, after an eleven-month absence from the sport for Gonzalez, at the MGM Grand in Las Vegas, Nevada. Gonzalez won the fight by unanimous decision, with one judge scoring the fight 97–93 in his favor, while the remaining two judges awarded him a 99–91 scorecard. He called for another chance at the world title in his post-fight interview, stating: "...I want another world title shot. I think I’ve earned it".

==== Gonzalez vs. Navarrete ====
On April 27, 2021, it was revealed that Gonzalez was in negotiations with the reigning WBO featherweight champion Emanuel Navarrete. The bout was officially announced on 14 September 2021, as the main event of an ESPN card, which took place at Pechanga Arena in San Diego, California. Gonzalez was once again the underdog in a world title fight, with most odds-makers having him at +425 and Navarrete as a -650 favorite to retain. He lost the fight by unanimous decision. Two of the judges scored the fight 116–112 for Navarrete, while the third judge scored it 118–110 in his favor. Navarrete landed almost three times as many punches as Gonzalez (272 to 169), and slightly more power punches (204 to 150). He threw 979 punches throughout the twelve round bout, averaging 81.6 punches per round.

=== Continued featherweight career ===
Gonzalez faced the one-time WBO super-bantamweight title challenger Jeo Santisima for the vacant WBO International featherweight strap on 4 March 2022. He re-captured his former title by a ninth-round knockout, as referee Edward Collantes stopped the fight at the 2:05 minute mark, following a right straight from Gonzalez which left Santisima badly staggered.

Gonzalez was booked to face the former WBO junior-featherweight champion Isaac Dogboe on 23 July 2022, in the main event of an ESPN+ card, which will take place at the Grand Casino in Hinckley, Minnesota. Aside from being his first WBO International title defense, the bout also served as a WBC featherweight title eliminator. He lost the fight by split decision. Two of the judges scored the fight 96–94 for Dogboe, while the third judge awarded an identical scorecard to Gonzalez.

Gonzalez faced Enrique Vivas on 1 April 2023. He won the fight by unanimous decision, with two scorecards of 98–92 and one scorecard of 99–91. This victory earned Gonzalez the chance to challenge Luis Alberto Lopez for the IBF featherweight championship, with the title bout currently planned to take place on September 15, 2023, in Corpus Christi, Texas. He lost the fight by unanimous decision.

== Personal life ==
Gonzalez is the older brother of boxer Jajaira Gonzalez.

== Professional boxing record ==
31 fights	26 wins	5 losses
By knockout	15	0
By decision	11	5

No.	Result	Record	Opponent	Type	Round, time	Date	Location	Notes
32	Loss	27–5	Brandon Figueroa	UD	12	19 Jul 2025	MGM Grand Garden Arena, Paradise, Nevada, U.S.	
31	Win	27–4	Arnold Khegai	SD	10	8 Mar 2025	Thunder Studios, Long Beach, California, U.S.	
30	Loss	26–4	Luis Alberto Lopez	UD	12	15 Sep 2023	American Bank Center, Corpus Christi, Texas, U.S.	For IBF featherweight title
29	Win	26–3	Enrique Vivas	UD	10	1 Apr 2023	Hard Rock Hotel & Casino, Tulsa, Oklahoma, U.S.	
28	Loss	25–3	Isaac Dogboe	SD	10	23 Jul 2022	Grand Casino, Hinckley, Minnesota, U.S.	Lost WBO International featherweight title
27	Win	25–2	Jeo Santisima	TKO	9 (10), 2:05	4 Mar 2022	Save Mart Center, Fresno, California, U.S.	Won vacant WBO International featherweight title
26	Loss	24–2	Emanuel Navarrete	UD	12	15 Oct 2021	Pechanga Arena, San Diego, California, U.S.	For WBO featherweight title
25	Win	24–1	Miguel Marriaga	UD	10	12 Sep 2020	MGM Grand, Paradise, Nevada, U.S.	Won vacant WBO Inter-Continental featherweight title
24	Loss	23–1	Shakur Stevenson	UD	12	26 Oct 2019	Reno-Sparks Convention Center, Reno, Nevada, U.S.	For vacant WBO featherweight title
23	Win	23–0	Manuel Avila	KO	6 (10), 2:27	13 Jul 2019	Dignity Health Sports Park, Carson, California, U.S.	Won vacant WBA Continental and WBO Global featherweight titles
22	Win	22–0	Rodrigo Guerrero	KO	5 (10), 2:27	30 Mar 2019	Fantasy Springs Casino, Indio, California, U.S.	Retained WBO-NABO featherweight title
21	Win	21–0	Javier Gallo	KO	2 (8), 1:17	8 Dec 2018	Fantasy Springs Casino, Indio, California, U.S.	
20	Win	20–0	Rafael Rivera	SD	10	13 Jul 2018	The Novo, Los Angeles, California, U.S.	Won vacant WBO-NABO featherweight title
19	Win	19–0	Rolando Magbanua	KO	5 (10), 2:06	22 Mar 2018	Fantasy Springs Casino, Indio, California, U.S.	
18	Win	18–0	Isao Gonzalo Carranza	KO	3 (8), 2:59	14 Dec 2017	Fantasy Springs Casino, Indio, California, U.S.	
17	Win	17–0	Deivi Julio	KO	5 (10), 2:57	26 Aug 2017	Dignity Health Sports Park, Carson, California, U.S.	
16	Win	16–0	Derrick Murray	TKO	5 (8), 1:55	1 Apr 2017	Cosmopolitan of Las Vegas, Paradise, Nevada, U.S.	
15	Win	15–0	Jairo Ochoa Martinez	KO	4 (8), 2:40	17 Dec 2016	Kia Forum, Inglewood, California, U.S.	
14	Win	14–0	Sergio Lopez Garcia	UD	10	5 Aug 2016	Belasco Theatre, Los Angeles, California, U.S.	
13	Win	13–0	Ricardo Proano	UD	8	5 Aug 2016	Toshiba Plaza, Paradise, Nevada, U.S.	
12	Win	12–0	Marcos Rios	KO	3 (8), 2:50	6 Nov 2015	Belasco Theater, Los Angeles, California, U.S.	
11	Win	11–0	Jose Tamayo Gonzalez	KO	3 (6), 2:17	8 Aug 2015	Fantasy Springs Casino, Indio, California, U.S.	
10	Win	10–0	Jose Angel Beranza	UD	8	22 May 2015	Fantasy Springs Casino, Indio, California, U.S.	
9	Win	9–0	Ali Gonzalez	KO	2 (6), 2:55	2 Apr 2015	Belasco Theater, Los Angeles, California, U.S.	
8	Win	8–0	Jamie Gutierrez	TKO	3 (6), 2:17	20 Dec 2014	Celebrity Theatre, Phoenix, Arizona, U.S.	
7	Win	7–0	David Clark	TKO	2 (6), 1:35	9 Jul 2014	Hard Rock Hotel and Casino, Paradise, Nevada, U.S.	
6	Win	6–0	Cesar Martinez	UD	6	28 Feb 2014	DoubleTree Hotel, Ontario, California, U.S.	
5	Win	5–0	David Reyes	UD	4	7 Sep 2013	Fantasy Springs Casino, Indio, California, U.S.	
4	Win	4–0	Alex Chavez	UD	4	3 May 2013	Cosmopolitan of Las Vegas, Paradise, Nevada, U.S.	
3	Win	3–0	Sergio Najera	UD	4	15 Mar 2013	Marconi Automative Museum, Tustin, California, U.S.	
2	Win	2–0	Victor Serrano Islas	TKO	1 (4), 1:47	3 Nov 2012	Phoenix Club, Anaheim, California, U.S.	
1	Win	1–0	Jesus Carmona	UD	4	7 Jul 2012	The Hangar, Costa Mesa, California, U.S.	
