= Emanuel Navarrete =

Mexican boxer (born 1995)

Personal information
- Nickname: Vaquero ("Cowboy")
- Born: Emanuel Navarrete Martinez; 17 January 1995 (age 31) San Juan Zitlaltepec, State of Mexico, Mexico
- Height: 5 ft 7 in (170 cm)
- Weight: Super bantamweight; Featherweight; Super featherweight; Lightweight

Boxing career
- Reach: 72 in (183 cm)
- Stance: Orthodox

Boxing record
- Total fights: 45
- Wins: 40
- Win by KO: 33
- Losses: 3
- Draws: 1
- No contests: 1

Emanuel Navarrete Martínez (born 17 January 1995) is a Mexican professional boxer. He is a three-division world champion, having won titles from junior featherweight to super featherweight.

He won his first world title, the WBO junior featherweight at the age of 23, dethroning champion Isaac Dogboe and then dominated him in a rematch. He made five successful defences, before moving up to featherweight winning the vacant WBO title against Ruben Villa, becoming a two-weight world champion. He defended the title three times, before becoming a three-weight world champion in 2023, winning the vacant WBO title at super featherweight against Liam Wilson. In 2024, he dared to become a four-weight world champion when he challenged Denys Berinchyk at lightweight, only to lose via a close split decision. Navarrete then moved back down in weight to retain his super featherweight belt. He holds two successful defences over multi-weight champion Óscar Valdez. He had his first ever unification bout in 2026, successfully consolidating the WBO and IBF super featherweight titles.

== Early life ==
Navarrete was raised in a modest and tightly knit community, where he acquired skills in resilience and discipline. The sport of boxing was a familial tradition, with his brothers Jhonny and Pedro, as well as cousins and an uncle, participating in the sport, which played a significant role in his own foray into boxing. In addition to boxing, his family was involved in construction and interior design, and Navarrete briefly participated in the family business before dedicating himself entirely to boxing. Although he completed high school, he chose to leave formal education to concentrate on his boxing career. His early commitment to the sport led him to prioritize training and competition over further academic pursuits.

== Amateur career ==
Navarrete had an amateur record of 108–7.

== Professional career ==
=== Early career ===
Navarrete made his professional debut, at the age of 16, against Misael Ramirez on 18 February 2012. He won the fight by a first-round technical knockout. He became the first boxer to stop Ramirez, achieving a notable debut in his career. In the same year, Navarrete participated in seven fights against opponents such as Ivan Donovan, Ismael Garnica, and Ramon Pena. Subsequently, he fought Daniel Argueta on 26 July 2012, which marked the first defeat of his career, in only his sixth professional fight, despite a commendable effort.

Following this setback, he secured victories against Ramon Pena and Antonio Gutierrez. Additionally, on 8 August 8, he defeated Emmanuel Dominguez by technical knockout in the fourth round. He also halted the winning streaks of Enrique Bernache and Marco Gonzalez and became the first to defeat Alberto Luna. Continuing his success, Navarrete achieved a victory over Ricardo Roman on 28 November 28, winning by knockout in the third round. Similarly, he triumphed over Osvaldo Castro on 5 March 2016, winning by technical knockout in the fifth round. Navarrete amassed a 25–1 record during the first six years of his professional career, winning all but three of those fights by way of stoppage and all fights taking place in Mexico.

=== Super Bantamweight ===
==== Navarrete vs. Dogboe ====
It was announced on 17 October 2018, that Navarrete would challenge the reigning WBO junior featherweight champion Isaac Dogboe, in what was Dogboe's second title defense. The bout was scheduled for the undercard of a 8 December 2018, Top Rank card headlined by a unified lightweight title fight between Vasyl Lomachenko and Jose Pedraza. The event took place at the Hulu Theater in New York City and was broadcast by ESPN in the Americas and by VITV in Dogboe's native Ghana. Navarrete entered the first title bout of his career as a significant underdog, with most odds-makers having him a +500 underdog, while Dogboe was seen as a –800 favorite. Despite this, Navarrete won the fight by unanimous decision. Two of the judges scored the fight 116–112 for him, while the third judge scored it 115–113 in his favor. Dogboe dropped Navarrete with a right hand in the ninth round, but no knockdown was called, as referee Benjy Esteves Jr. deemed it an illegal punch. The fight ended with Navarrete having landed (221 to 176) and thrown (804 to 686) more punches than Dogboe.

==== Navarrete vs. Dogboe II ====
The pair was scheduled to fight an immediate rematch on 11 May 2019, at the Convention Center in Tucson, Arizona. The rematch headlined a Top Rank card, broadcast by ESPN. Navarrete was more convincing in their second meeting, winning the fight by a later twelfth-round technical knockout. He was in control from the beginning of the fight, keeping Dogboe at range with jabs and accumulating damage with straight punches. Navarrete began to dominate from the ninth round onward, with the former champion visibly flagging. Doboe's father and coach finally threw in the towel in the final minute of the last round. Navarrete landed almost three times as many strikes as Dogboe, out-landing the Ghanaian 314 to 121 in total punches.

==== Navarrete vs. De Vaca ====
It was revealed by ESPN on 14 June 2019, that Navarrete was expected to make his second title defense against the undefeated Francisco De Vaca at a date, location and venue which would be announced later. The fight was originally scheduled for the José Benavidez Jr. and Luis Collazo undercard, but was later promoted to headline the 17 August Top Rank card, after Benavidez withdrew due to injury. The fight took place at the Banc of California Stadium on Los Angeles, California, and was broadcast by ESPN. Navarrete justified his role as the betting favorite, winning the fight by a third-round technical knockout. Navarrete spent the entirety of the fight pressuring De Vaca, undeterred by the power coming back at him, finally finishing his opponent with a flurry of punches at the 1:54 minute mark of the third round.

==== Navarrete vs. Elorde ====
Five days after Navarrete made his second title defense, Top Rank vice-president Carl Moretti confirmed that Navarrete would make his third title defense against the #2 ranked WBO junior featherweight Juan Miguel Elorde. The fight was booked for the undercard of the Tyson Fury vs. Otto Wallin heavyweight bout at the T-Mobile Arena, Paradise, Nevada which took place on 14 September 2019, just 28 days after Navarrete's previous fight. The fight was broadcast on BT Sport and ESPN+ pay-per-view. Navarrete came into the fight as a –3000 favorite. Navarrete won the fight by a fourth-round technical knockout. He first knocked Elorde down in the third round, before stopping him with a flurry of punches a round later.

==== Navarrete vs. Horta ====
Navarrete was booked to make his fourth title WBO junior featherweight title defense against Francisco Horta, in his fourth fight of the year. The fight was scheduled as for the undercard of an ESPN broadcast Top Rank card which took place on 7 December 2019, at the Auditorio GNP Seguros in Puebla, Mexico. It was Navarrete's first title fight in his native Mexico. Navarrete won the fight by a fourth-round technical knockout. After a slow start, Navarrete began catching Horta with looping punches, finally stopping his opponent at the 2:09 minute mark of the fourth round.

==== Navarrete vs. Santisima ====
On 30 January 2020, it was announced that Navarrete would make the fifth defense of his title against Jeo Santisima. The fight was booked for the Deontay Wilder vs. Tyson Fury II pay-per-view undercard, which took place at the MGM Grand Garden Arena in Paradise, Nevada on 22 February 2020. Navarrete once again justified his role as the favorite, winning the fight by an eleventh-round stoppage. Navarrete appeared to be unusually slow and fatigued throughout the bout, but still managed to stagger the Filipino challenger in the fifth round, before stopping him with a barrage of punches at the 2:20 minute mark of the eleventh round. Navarrete claimed that he had suffered a right thumb injury during the post-fight interview, saying: "I hurt him weirdly with my right hand and hurt my thumb but I had to plough through it".

=== Featherweight ===
==== Navarrete vs. Villa ====
Navarrete accepted a fight at featherweight against Uriel López on 20 June 2020, for his next bout. He won the fight by a sixth-round technical knockout. He dominated his opponent, out-landing him 190 to 49 in total punches, and 150 to 38 in power punches. Following this victory, Navarrete claimed he would vacate his junior featherweight title in the post-fight interview, should the other champions refuse to face him in a title unification bout. Navarrete officially vacated the WBO junior featherweight title on 12 July 2020, and moved up to featherweight. Due to the rules of the sanctioning body, he immediately became the mandatory challenger for the vacant WBO featherweight title.

The WBO ordered their #2 ranked featherweight contender Jessie Magdaleno to face mandatory challenger and #1 ranked contender Navarrete for the vacant title. As the two camps were unable to come to terms regarding the bout, the WBO ordered a purse bid to be held, which was won by Top Rank with a bid of $250,000. Although the fight was initially expected to take place in October of the same year, the idea was later scrapped as Magdaleno failed to respond to a Top Rank contract offer, unsatisfied with the proposed purse. As such, the next highest ranked contender Ruben Villa accepted the fight instead. The fight for the vacant belt between Navarrete and Villa was booked as the main event of an 9 October 2020, ESPN broadcast card.

Navarrete won the fight by unanimous decision, slightly edging Villa on the strength of two knockdowns. He first knocked Villa down with a left uppercut near the end of the first round, while the second knockdown was the result of a left hook in the fourth round. Two of the judges scored the fight 114–112 in his favor, while the third judge awarded him a 115–111 scorecard. Navarrete landed 163 to Villa's 131 total punches, while the difference in power punches landed was far more pronounced, with Navarrete landing 131 to Villa's 58. During the post-fight interview, Navarrete called for a title unification bout with the IBF featherweight champion Josh Warrington.

==== Navarrete vs. Díaz ====
Navarrete was booked to make his first WBO featherweight title defense against the one-time WBO super featherweight title challenger Christopher Díaz (26–2, 16 KOs). The fight was scheduled as the main event of an ESPN card that took place on 24 April 2021, at the Silver Spurs Arena in Kissimmee, Florida. Just as in all of his previous title defenses, Navarrete was seen as the favorite to retain, with most odds-makers having him as a –900 favorite. Díaz entered the fight with confidence in his ability to win. He analysed Navarrete's style in the ring and believed he could create an upset. With three weeks to go, Top Rank announced tickets had sold out. The event was limited to approximately one-third of its total capacity because of social distancing guidelines, which permitted over 3,000 attendees to be present. Navarrete weighed 126 pounds prior to his first title defense, having adjusted from an initial weight that slightly exceeded the limit. Díaz recorded a weight of 125.8 pounds.

In front of a crowd of 3,262 people, Navarrete won the fight by a late twelfth-round technical knockout. Navarrete dominated most of the fight, demonstrating his strength and executing accurate combinations. He knocked Díaz down several times, including once in the fourth and twice in the eighth round with strong uppercuts and a series of punches.The fight ended dramatically when Navarrete delivered a solid right hook that knocked Díaz to the ground. His corner subsequently decided to stop the fight, leading to a TKO victory for Navarrete in the 12th round. Navarrete landed 257 to Díaz's 183 total punches, with 241 of those being power punches. Following his first stoppage loss, Díaz praised Navarrete, "I’m very disappointed. I wanted to win. It’s a title shot. But next time. He’s a great f------ fighter. He hit hard. We went to war. I made my best fight. I was in shape. Everything was good." Navarrete commended Díaz and talked about upcoming matches, mentioning that he would take a break, acknowledging that this fight was very demanding for him, and expressing his desire to pursue unification at featherweight. The fight averaged 715,000 viewers and peaked at 797,000 viewers. This was lower than the opening match featuring rising prospect Edgar Berlanga, whose victory over Desmond Nicholson drew a peak audience of 829,000 viewers.

==== Navarrete vs. Gonzalez ====
On 27 April 2021, just three days after his first title defense, it was revealed that Navarrete was in talks to face mandatory challenger Joet Gonzalez (24–1, 14 KOs). Gonzalez had earned his mandatory status by beating the three-time world title challenger Miguel Marriaga. The fight was officially announced as the main event for the ESPN broadcast card on 15 October 2021, to take place at Pechanga Arena in San Diego, California. A scale issue caused Navarrete and Gonzalez to wait a few additional minutes before making weight. Navarrete weighed 125.8 pounds and Gonzalez came in at 125.4 pounds. Navarrete retained the title by unanimous decision. Two of the judges scored the fight 116–112 for Navarrete, while the third judge scored it 118–110 in his favor. Navarrete threw a hundred more punches than Gonzalez, with a total of 272 compared to 169, and also landed approximately fifty more power punches, scoring 204 against Gonzalez's 150. He threw 979 punches throughout the twelve round bout, averaging 81.6 punches per round. Both fighters remained standing throughout the fight, although Gonzalez suffered visible damage, with cuts around both eyes by the fight's end. Following the fight, Navarrete acknowledged Gonzalez's performance, noting that it was a competitive fight and emphasizing the importance of conditioning in his win. Gonzalez contended that he had inflicted damage on Navarrete during the bout and felt he might have secured a victory, pointing to rounds where he perceived himself as the stronger fighter.

==== Navarrete vs. Baez ====
In June 2022, it was announced that Navarrete would make his third title defense against the #7 ranked WBO featherweight Eduardo Baez. The bout was scheduled as the main event of an ESPN broadcast card, which took place at Pechanga Arena in San Diego, California, on 20 August 2022. Before the fight was announced, Navarrete was in discussions to challenge super featherweight champion Shakur Stevenson (18–0, 9 KOs), but the negotiations fell apart. Navarrete registered a weight of 125.8 pounds on his second attempt after exceeding the limit on his initial try. Baez weighed in the same. Navarrete overcame a slow start to win the bout by a sixth-round knockout. He hit Baez with a left hook to the body in the first minute of the sixth round, which led to his opponent taking a knee and being counted out at the one minute mark. Navarrete was down on the scorecards at the time of the stoppage, with two judges having Baez ahead 50–45 and 48–47, while the third judge had Navarrete leading 49–46. He floated the idea of moving up to super featherweight in his post-fight speech, stating: "I’m going to rest because we had a difficult and hard camp. We’re going to sit down and talk about if those options include fighting at 126 or 130 pounds". Navarrete stated he did not underestimate Baez. The fight averaged an audience of 485,000 viewers and peaked at 494,000.

=== Super featherweight ===
==== Navarrete vs. Wilson ====
On 9 November 2022, the WBO formally ordered Navarrete to face the two-weight world champion Óscar Valdez for the vacant WBO super featherweight championship. He wasn't stripped of his featherweight title however, as he was granted a one-fight exception to move up in weight. The vacant title bout was scheduled as the main event of an ESPN broadcast card, which took place at the Desert Diamond Arena in Glendale, Arizona on 3 February 2023. Valdez withdrew from the fight on 13 December. Navarrete was instead re-booked to face the once-defeated Liam Wilson for the vacant title. The card was finalised on 20 December to take place on 3 February 2023. At the time the fight was announced, Wilson was already in a training camp. He was due to fight British boxer Archie Sharp on 28 January in Las Vegas. Wilson was withdrawn from that show at the appropriate time, as his team accepted an offer to take Valdez's place. This decision ultimately proved to be fortuitous, as the event was cancelled altogether on 24 December. Navarrete weighed 129.2 pounds and Wilson, who was making his U.S. debut, weighed a career-light 126.3 pounds. After the weigh-in, Wilson and his team were left confused. Wilson expressed surprise at the weight reported. He said, “I'm not too sure. I came in the lightest I’ve [weighed] in the past ten years. Something happened with the scales, I'm sure. I'm sure they've been tampered with. I weighed in 20 minutes prior to [Thursday's official weigh-in]. I was just under weight. I went on the official scales for the official weigh-in and I was [nearly] four pounds under, magically. So, in twenty minutes I lost four pounds, two kilos in Australian weight. His team also noted their belief that Navarrete exceeded the weight limit and claimed that the scales had been manipulated.

In an all-out slugfest, Navarrete survived a knockdown, rallied back and won the fight by a ninth-round technical knockout, becoming a three-weight world champion. Wilson managed to knock Navarrete down in the fourth round with a powerful left hook, marking the first time Navarrete had been knocked down in his career. After the fourth, Wilson was ahead on all three judges scorecards. Navarrete's legs remained unsteady in the fifth round; however, he gradually regained his composure, overcame the knockdown, and secured victory in that round, as well as in the subsequent rounds on all three judges' scorecards. Navarrete displayed significant effectiveness in the sixth round, delivering impactful body punches and maintaining an aggressive approach; however, Wilson countered with a notable right hand. In the early moments of the ninth round, Navarrete delivered a precise right hand to Wilson's chin, causing him to fall to the canvas. Although Wilson managed to get up before the count ended, he endured significant damage along the ropes, prompting referee Chris Flores to consider stopping the bout. Moments later, Navarrete cornered Wilson against the ropes once more. As he continued to deliver a series of unreturned punches, Flores intervened and stopped the fight at 1 minute and 57 seconds. Navarrete expressed satisfaction with his victory, acknowledging the challenge Wilson presented and his ability to recover from a knockdown. Wilson, while disappointed, praised Navarrete and stated that he felt he was robbed due to the referee's long count on his knockdown of Navarrete. According to CompuBox, Navarrete landed 152 of 453 punches thrown (34%) and Wilson landed 97 of his 388 thrown (25%). Navarrete connected with the majority of his punches during rounds six to nine, when he gained control of the fight. At the time of the stoppage, all three judges had Navarrete in the lead with scores of 76-75 and 77–74 on two cards.

Wilson and his team contended that the referee's count following Navarrete's knockdown was notably longer than usual, with estimates ranging from 20 to 27 seconds. Wilson expressed concern, feeling that the extended count deprived him of a fair chance to take advantage of his knockdown. During the count, Navarrete's mouthpiece was knocked out, which allowed additional time as the referee waited for it to be replaced. This situation led to accusations that Navarrete used the delay as a stalling tactic to recover from the knockdown. Wilson's promoter, No Limit, filed a protest with the Arizona Commission, requesting that the outcome be altered to a no-contest. Boxing experts and officials considered the referee's actions legitimate. The fight result was upheld, with no official change to a no contest.

Navarrete vacated his WBO featherweight title on 9 February 2023.

==== Navarrete vs. Valdez ====
On 22 May 2023, it was reported the bout with Óscar Valdez (31–1, 23 KOs) was to be rescheduled to take place on 12 August, at the Desert Diamond Arena in Glendale, Arizona. On 7 June, the fight was made official. The card was broadcast live on ESPN, ESPN Deportes and ESPN+. Bob Arum praised the fight, stating, “Emanuel Navarrete and Oscar Valdez are proud warriors, and this is a fight that is destined to go down as a classic.” Navarrete believed that taking on major fights was his path to the top of the division and proving he was the best in his weight class. Navarrete initially weighed 130.1 pounds for his first title defense. He then stripped down, and on his second attempt, weighed 130 pounds. Valdez weighed 129.8 pounds in his effort to secure a third world title.

The fight took place in front of 10,246 spectators. Navarrete held onto his belt, winning the fight via a clear unanimous decision. He dominated Valdez with his constant punching and power. It was a gritty battle with both fighters showing a lot of heart, but Navarrete's unyielding pressure made the difference. Navarrete threw an impressive 1,038 punches, landing 216 of them, while Valdez managed to throw 436 punches and land 140, highlighting Navarrete's incredible work rate. He kept Valdez on the defensive and connected with uppercuts and hooks that led to some swelling under Valdez's right eye. Valdez did try to find his chances with counter left hooks and had some success in the middle rounds, especially around rounds 5 to 9, but he just couldn't match Navarrete's pace. The judges scored the fight 119–109, 118–110, and 116–112 in favor of Navarrete. Afterwards, Valdez admitted that Navarrete was the better fighter that night, showing disappointment but also respect, and he promised to come back stronger. Navarrete fought through inflammation in his right hand. The ringside doctor looked over the hand after the bout stating it should heal within a couple of days. An average of 808,000 viewers watched the main event, with a peak audience of 884,000.

==== Navarrete vs. Conceição ====
Navarrete submitted a formal request to be promoted to "Super" champion status to the WBO on 15 September 2023. Later that day, it was announced that Navarrete would make his second WBO super featherweight championship defense against the two-time world title challenger Robson Conceição (17–2, 8 KOs, 1 NC) on 16 November at the T-Mobile Arena. Navarrete was officially promoted to "Super" champion status on 22 September and the fight was made official a week later, to be broadcast on ESPN, ESPN Deportes and ESPN+. Conceição's two defeats occurred in title matches, both under challenging circumstances. Navarrete expressed satisfaction in taking on a third fight in 2023, highlighting the quick turnaround following his recent victory. Navarrete weighed in at the limit and Conceição was lighter at 129.3 pounds.

Navarrete retained the title by a majority decision draw, despite knocking down Conceição twice. Two of the judges scored the fight an even 113–113, while the third had it 114–112 for the Navarrete. Navarrete knocked Conceição down in Round 4 and again in Round 7. He came close to securing a stoppage in the eleventh round as the referee moved closer to the action, but Conceição remained resilient. Both fighters expressed a desire for a rematch. Navarrete acknowledged the challenge posed by Conceição, stating, "If it's up to me, I would definitely give Robson a rematch because he definitely deserves it." Conceição, for his part, felt he showed what he was capable of, emphasizing his own performance during the fight. It was noted that had there Conceição not been dropped twice, he would have won the bout via majority decision. According to CompuBox, Navarrete landed 116 of 213 punches (24%) and Conceição was busier, landing 213 of 852 punches (25%). Conceição landed 112 jabs in total and 6 more power punches than Navarrete during the fight.

Navarrete successfully underwent a minor left hand surgery on 2 December 2023, to repair an injury that was re-aggravated during the contest with Conceição .

=== Lightweight ===
==== Navarrete vs. Berinchyk ====
On 30 January 2024, the WBO instructed Navarrete and Denys Berinchyk (18–0, 9 KOs) to initiate negotiations for a bout to compete for the vacant WBO lightweight title. This title became vacant following Devin Haney's decision to move up in weight. Talks began immediately, mostly positive between Top Rank and Top Rank and Alex Krassyuk for a deal to be reached before purse bids. On 13 March, a deal was finalised and the fight was set to take place on 18 May 2024. A press release later announced the fight would take place at the Pechanga Arena in San Diego, California. Navarrete said, “Capturing a world title is a unique challenge, but the possibility of doing it four weight classes is a goal that fills me with motivation and gratitude [...] to be able to do it in front of fans in San Diego and from Tijuana will be an unforgettable experience. Feeling their support and energy in the ring will propel me to do my best and secure this victory for Mexico.” Many felt the world title shot was long overdue for Berinchyk. His promoter advocated for him to secure a mandatory position for five years. Berinchyk successfully defended the WBO international title on nine occasions.

In a closely contested bout, Navarrete lost by split decision. The fight demonstrated moments of awkwardness and occasional sloppiness. Berinchyk showcased effective ring generalship, employing strong footwork and delivering quick counter punches. In contrast, Navarrete started slowly and found it challenging to establish his rhythm, throwing a high volume of punches but missing a significant number of them. Berinchyk's strategy and more precise shot selection enabled him to establish a considerable advantage during the middle rounds. The contest remained competitive, with both fighters exchanging strikes and achieving success at various points throughout the bout. Navarrete's unbeaten streak of 34 fights concluded upon the announcement of the scorecards. One judge had Navarrete winning 116–112, however the other two judges overruled, scoring fight 115–113, 116–112 for Berinchyk. Berinchyk expressed his joy at capturing the title, acknowledging the significance of the victory for Ukrainian boxing, especially on a day when countryman Oleksandr Usyk also won a major title. Navarrete acknowledged the challenge of moving up in weight and accepted that he needs to improve for future bouts. According to CompuBox, Navarrete landed 128 of 612 punches thrown (21%) and Berinchyk landed 127 of 732 thrown (17%).

=== Return to super featherweight ===
==== Navarrete vs. Valdez II ====
In June, the WBO ordered for Navarrete to make a defence of his WBO title against the interim champion Valdez (32–2, 24 KOs). On 2 August, a rematch between Navarrete and Valdez was rumoured to take place at the Footprint Center in Phoenix, Arizona on 7 December 2024. In October the card was finalised as a doubleheader featuring rematches. Valdez was pleased with the chance to seek retribution. The card took place a day before Bob Arum's 93rd birthday. Navarrete officially weighed in at 129.9 pounds, while Valdez weighed in at 130 pounds. Navarrete was entering the fight with a record 0-1-1 in his last two bouts, with his last win being against Valdez.

There was 8,438 fans in attendance. Navarrete dominated the rematch, dropping Valdez three times, eventually stopping in with a liver shot in the sixth round, to retain his world title. Navarrete dropped Valdez once near the end of Round 1 with a combination, again near the end of Round 4 from a right hand, and a third time in Round 5 with a left uppercut. The bout ended in the sixth when Navarrete landed a well-placed liver shot that sent Valdez down for the final count at 2:42. Judges had Navarrete ahead convincingly on all scorecards at the stoppage, with scores of 50-43 and 49-44 twice. Navarrete showcased improved aggression and precision compared to their first fight, using sharp angles and volume punching that overwhelmed Valdez, who could not find effective counters. Navarrete showcased improved aggression and precision compared to their first fight, using sharp angles and volume punching that overwhelmed Valdez, who could not find effective counters. Valdez struggled to keep pace and absorb the onslaught, failing to adjust his strategy effectively. Navarrete credited a surgically repaired left hand for his enhanced power, marking a new phase in his career. Over the six rounds, Navarrete landed 106 of 380 punches thrown (27.6%) and Valdez landed 78 of his 232 thrown (33.6%).

==== Navarrete vs. Suarez ====
On 19 March 2025, it was reported that Navarrete would make a fourth defense of his WBO title against the undefeated Charly Suarez, who was ranked first by the WBO. The fight was scheduled to take place on 10 May 2025 airing live on ESPN at the Pechanga Arena in San Diego. Suarez successfully weighed in at 129.9 pounds on his first attempt and expressed his enthusiasm for the chance to become a champion for the first time. Navarrete initially missed weight, coming in at 130.3 pounds, but successfully made the 130-pound limit within the two-hour allowance. On his final attempt, the scale displayed 130.1 pounds. He was instructed to “Exhalar,” after which the scale registered 130 pounds.

Navarrete retained his WBO title by controversial technical decision after the fight was stopped due to a cut over Navarrete's eye in the eighth round. Referee Edward Collantes determined the cause was due to an accidental clash of heads; as a result, the fight went to the scorecards, which read 78–75, 77–76, and 77–76 in favor of Navarrete. Navarrete initiated the match with a vigorous approach, delivering impactful punches and leveraging his physical advantages, highlighted by a powerful right hand that caused a nosebleed for Suarez shortly into the bout. In response, Suarez demonstrated effective counterattacks, focusing on Navarrete's body and attempting to exploit any vulnerabilities arising from his recent weight cut. In the sixth round, Navarrete sustained a cut above his left eye, which became a significant point of contention. Initially believed to result from a headbutt, subsequent replays suggested that the injury may have been inflicted by a punch. The presence of blood affecting Navarrete's vision significantly influenced the outcome of the fight. If the referee had made a ruling based on this condition, Suarez would have been declared the winner by technical knockout (TKO). Navarrete landed 98 of 366 punches thrown (27%) and Suarez landed 86 of 412 thrown (21%).

Subsequently, team Suarez appealed to the California State Athletic Commission (CSAC). On 2 June, the CSAC overturned Navarrete's unanimous technical decision win to a no contest, prompting the WBO to order a rematch.

==== Navarrete vs. Núñez ====
Navarrete's pursuit of a unification bout against Eduardo "Sugar" Núñez (30–1, 28 KOs) depended on negotiations with his mandatory contender, Suarez. Navarrete attended Nunez's recent title defense, and both teams expressed interest in a unification fight. However, securing Suarez's agreement was essential; Navarrete would need to negotiate a financial step-aside deal or arrange future considerations for a bout with Suarez. On 30 October, it was reported that Top Rank was negotiating a step-aside agreement for Suarez, and a fight with Núnez was being considered for 24 January 2026 in Phoenix, under Matchroom Boxing on DAZN. The WBO granted a 15-day extension for negotiations. The fight was announced the next day to take place on 7 March 2026 at the Footprint Center in Phoenix. A week later, the fight was relocated to Desert Diamond Arena in Glendale, Arizona and the date was brought forward to 28 February. Both described the fight as a “war between Mexicans” and promised a brutal, action-packed fight.

Navarrete encountered passport issues in Mexico which delayed his travel to Arizona for the fight. This caused for him to miss the press conference and other promotional events he was due to attend. Despite the delay, the weigh-in schedule remained unchanged, as he was rescheduled to arrive on 26 February at 8 p.m. MT. DraftKings listed Núnez is a -200 betting favorite, with Navarrete a +155 underdog. At the weigh in, Navarrete stepped on the scales at 129.2 pounds. Núnez weighed 129.8 pounds.

In front of around 12,000 fans in attendance, Navarrete won the fight by technical knockout at the start of the eleventh round when the ringside doctor ruled an injury to Núnez's eye was too bad for him to continue. Navarrete dominated the fight, unifying the WBO and IBF titles. Núnez started on the back foot, attempting to outbox Navarrete in the opening rounds. He focused more on his jab and movement, however Navarrete's aggression and accuracy kept him in control of the fight. By the sixth round, Núnez turned up the attack, moving on to the front foot, successfully targeting Navarrete's body, but Navarrete managed to maintain dominance, meeting him on the inside, landing combinations of hooks and uppercuts. Navarrete then increased his intensity, hurting Núnez with power shots. Núnez was able to have some success in the eighth round by landing clean shots to the body. In the ninth, Núnez's right eye was swelling and his legs were wobbling, showing visible signs that he was in trouble. In the tenth, Núnez continued to press forward despite blood pouring near his right eye. Navarrete continued to land powerful combinations to the head and body. The ringside doctor then inspected his eye after the round, ending the fight. Eddie Hearn, Núnez's promoter, encouraged his corner to stop the fight between rounds, but they did not take that action. Despite seeing Núnez in pain during the fight, Navarrete stated that he never considered easing up. He had to remain focused on securing the win, knowing the unpredictability nature of a fight, where a single punch could change the outcome. Navarrete landed 182 of 381 power punches (48%). At the time of stoppage, one judge had it a 100–90 shutout and the other two had the same score of 98–92 all in favor of Navarrete. According to CompuBox, Navarrete landed 236 of 594 punches thrown (40%) and Núnez landed 140 of 445 (32%). 80 of Navarrete's overall punches landed came in the ninth and tenth rounds.

==== Navarrete vs. Foster ====
Prior to the fight against Nunez, Navarrete was committed in to giving Charly Suarez a rematch. Suarez was confident the fight would be made after Navarrete told him, "Navarrete and Suarez II for the belts." On 11 March 2026, the WBO ordered the rematch, giving both teams 20 days to negotiate. In July, Suarez maintained his unbeaten record by stopping Manuel Ávila in the opening round of their bout. Afterwards, Suarez's team formally requested that the WBO re-order its previously mandated rematch with Navarrete. In early August, reports emerged that a unification bout between Navarrete and WBC champion O'Shaquie Foster (25–3, 12 KOs) was being targeted for October 24, but Navarrete's team denied that an agreement had been reached. Navarrete's manager, Alejandro Brito, rejected suggestions that the fight had been finalized, stating that his team had not yet agreed to the proposed terms. On 16 August, DAZN's Chris Mannix reported that Navarrete and Foster would meet in a unification bout on 24 October in San Antonio. The WBO considered granting an exception that would allow Navarrete to postpone a mandatory defense against Suarez as the fight would potentially unify three of the four major world championships in the division. While evaluating the proposed unification, the WBO described Navarrete vs. Foster as "one of the most significant and compelling matchups" that could be made at 130 pounds and referred the matter to its championship committee for a formal ruling. On 25 August, Olivieri announced that Navarrete's title could be contested in the fight on the condition that the winner makes a mandatory defence against Charly Suarez within 180 days. On 2 September, it was officially announced that Navarrete would face Foster on October 24 for a three-belt unification bout, with the vacant The Ring championship also on the line, at Frost Bank Center in San Antonio. The fight was being promoted as a clash of styles, with Navarrete's reputation for his high‑pressure, unorthodox offense and Foster regarded as a technical boxer‑puncher. At the launch press conference, Foster stated that he intended to take the initiative, saying, “I'm gonna control the fight… I ain't never ran from nobody”, and promised to give Navarrete “a boxing lesson.” Navarrete said he was happy to engage, stating that “it's very difficult to have a fight with just one person… It's about showing who's best.” Foster was entering the bout following a majority decision win over former featherweight champion Raymond Ford in May 2026. During fight week, according to DraftKings, Foster was a -185 betting favorite.

== Professional boxing record ==
45 fights	40 wins	3 losses
By knockout	33	0
By decision	7	3
Draws	1	
No contests	1	

No.	Result	Record	Opponent	Type	Round, time	Date	Location	Notes
45	Loss	40–3–1 (1)	O'Shaquie Foster	UD	12	24 Oct 2026	Frost Bank Center, San Antonio, Texas, U.S.	Lost IBF and WBO super featherweight titles; For WBC and vacant The Ring super featherweight titles
44	Win	40–2–1 (1)	Eduardo Núñez	TKO	11 (12), 0:01	28 Feb 2026	Desert Diamond Arena, Glendale, Arizona, U.S.	Retained WBO super featherweight title; Won IBF super featherweight title
43	NC	39–2–1 (1)	Charly Suarez	NC	8 (12), 0:01	10 May 2025	Pechanga Arena, San Diego, California, U.S.	Retained WBO super featherweight title; Originally a unanimous TD win for Navarrete, later changed to NC due to an incorrect referee call
42	Win	39–2–1	Óscar Valdez	KO	6 (12), 2:42	7 Dec 2024	Footprint Center, Phoenix, Arizona, U.S.	Retained WBO super featherweight title
41	Loss	38–2–1	Denys Berinchyk	SD	12	18 May 2024	Pechanga Arena, San Diego, California, U.S.	For vacant WBO lightweight title
40	Draw	38–1–1	Robson Conceição	MD	12	16 Nov 2023	T-Mobile Arena, Las Vegas, Nevada, U.S.	Retained WBO super featherweight title
39	Win	38–1	Óscar Valdez	UD	12	12 Aug 2023	Desert Diamond Arena, Glendale, Arizona, U.S.	Retained WBO super featherweight title
38	Win	37–1	Liam Wilson	TKO	9 (12), 1:57	3 Feb 2023	Desert Diamond Arena, Glendale, Arizona, U.S.	Won vacant WBO super featherweight title
37	Win	36–1	Eduardo Baez	KO	6 (12), 1:05	20 Aug 2022	Pechanga Arena, San Diego, California, U.S.	Retained WBO featherweight title
36	Win	35–1	Joet Gonzalez	UD	12	15 Oct 2021	Pechanga Arena, San Diego, California, U.S.	Retained WBO featherweight title
35	Win	34–1	Christopher Díaz	TKO	12 (12), 2:49	24 Apr 2021	Silver Spurs Arena, Kissimmee, Florida, U.S.	Retained WBO featherweight title
34	Win	33–1	Ruben Villa	UD	12	9 Oct 2020	MGM Grand Conference Center, Paradise, Nevada, U.S.	Won vacant WBO featherweight title
33	Win	32–1	Uriel López	TKO	6 (10), 2:22	20 Jun 2020	Gimnasio TV Azteca, Mexico City, Mexico	
32	Win	31–1	Jeo Santisima	TKO	11 (12), 2:20	22 Feb 2020	MGM Grand Garden Arena, Paradise, Nevada, U.S.	Retained WBO junior featherweight title
31	Win	30–1	Francisco Horta	KO	4 (12), 2:09	7 Dec 2019	Auditorio GNP Seguros, Puebla, Mexico	Retained WBO junior featherweight title
30	Win	29–1	Juan Miguel Elorde	TKO	4 (12), 0:26	14 Sep 2019	T-Mobile Arena, Paradise, Nevada, U.S.	Retained WBO junior featherweight title
29	Win	28–1	Francisco De Vaca	KO	3 (12), 1:54	17 Aug 2019	Banc of California Stadium, Los Angeles, California, U.S.	Retained WBO junior featherweight title
28	Win	27–1	Isaac Dogboe	TKO	12 (12), 2:02	11 May 2019	Convention Center, Tucson, Arizona, U.S.	Retained WBO junior featherweight title
27	Win	26–1	Isaac Dogboe	UD	12	8 Dec 2018	Hulu Theater, New York City, New York, U.S.	Won WBO junior featherweight title
26	Win	25–1	Jose Sanmartin	KO	12 (12), 0:46	2 Jun 2018	Arena José Sulaimán, Monterrey, Mexico	
25	Win	24–1	Breilor Teran	TKO	4 (10), 2:31	10 Mar 2018	Domo Sindicato de Trabajadores IMSS, Tlalpan, Mexico	
24	Win	23–1	Glenn Porras	TKO	2 (10), 1:37	20 Jan 2018	Domo Sindicato de Trabajadores IMSS, Tlalpan, Mexico	
23	Win	22–1	Danny Flores	TKO	2 (10), 2:43	29 Jun 2017	Domo Sindicato de Trabajadores IMSS, Tlalpan, Mexico	
22	Win	21–1	Jhon Gemino	TKO	5 (10), 2:20	29 Jun 2017	Domo Sindicato de Trabajadores IMSS, Tlalpan, Mexico	
21	Win	20–1	Luis Bedolla Orozco	TKO	2 (8), 2:28	24 Jun 2017	Domo del Parque San Rafael, Guadalajara, Mexico	
20	Win	19–1	Salvador Hernandez Sanchez	TKO	1 (10), 2:48	25 Mar 2017	Gimnasio Municipal, Palenque, Mexico	
19	Win	18–1	Dennis Contreras	TKO	6 (10), 0:50	21 Jan 2017	Deportivo Benito Juárez, Mexico City, Mexico	
18	Win	17–1	Martin Casillas	UD	10	8 Oct 2016	Estadio Francisco León García, Puerto Peñasco, Mexico	
17	Win	16–1	Eleazar Valenzuela	UD	8	13 Aug 2016	PoBaja California Center, Tijuana, Mexico	
16	Win	15–1	Roberto Pucheta	TKO	2 (8), 2:55	16 Jul 2016	Polideportivo Soraya Jimenez, Los Reyes La Paz, Mexico	
15	Win	14–1	Oswaldo Castro	TKO	5 (10), 1:55	5 Mar 2016	Arena Ciudad de Mexico, Mexico City, Mexico	
14	Win	13–1	Ricardo Roman	KO	3 (10), 2:59	28 Nov 2015	Arena Tequisquiapan, Tequisquiapan, Mexico	
13	Win	12–1	Jonathan Lecona Ramos	TKO	4 (8), 0:54	5 Sep 2015	Gran Teatro Moliere, Polanco, Mexico	
12	Win	11–1	Enrique Bernache	TKO	6 (8), 1:21	4 Jul 2015	Centro de Usos Multiples, Hermosillo, Mexico	
11	Win	10–1	Marco Antonio Gonzalez	RTD	2 (6), 3:00	21 Feb 2015	Gimnasio Municipal Zumpango, Zumpango, Mexico	
10	Win	9–1	Alberto Luna Galicia	UD	8	21 Nov 2014	Jose Cuervo Salon, Polanco, Mexico	
9	Win	8–1	Emmanuel Dominguez	TKO	4 (4)	8 Aug 2014	Jose Cuervo Salon, Polanco, Mexico	
8	Win	7–1	Antonio Gutierrez	TKO	4 (8), 2:40	2 Mar 2013	Gimnasio de las Liebres, Rio Bravo, Mexico	
7	Win	6–1	Ramon Pena	TKO	2 (4), 1:01	15 Dec 2012	Auditorio Municipal, San Juan Zitlaltepec, Mexico	
6	Loss	5–1	Daniel Argueta	UD	4	26 Jul 2012	Jose Cuervo Salon, Polanco, Mexico	Cinturón de Oro XVIII: flyweight final; Navarrete was named champion as Argueta didn't appear at the weigh-in.
5	Win	5–0	Ismael Garnica	TKO	1 (4)	21 Jun 2012	Jose Cuervo Salon, Polanco, Mexico	Cinturón de Oro XVIII: flyweight semi-final
4	Win	4–0	Ivan Ochoa Sanchez	TKO	1 (4)	10 May 2012	Jose Cuervo Salon, Polanco, Mexico	Cinturón de Oro XVIII: flyweight quarter-final
3	Win	3–0	Ivan Donovan	TKO	1 (4), 1:52	12 Apr 2012	Jose Cuervo Salon, Polanco, Mexico	Cinturón de Oro XVIII: flyweight preliminaries
2	Win	2–0	Jonathan Rojas	TKO	1 (4)	8 Mar 2012	Jose Cuervo Salon, Polanco, Mexico	Cinturón de Oro XVIII: flyweight preliminaries
1	Win	1–0	Misael Ramirez	TKO	1 (4)	18 Feb 2012	Auditorio Municipal, Zumpango, Mexico	

== Personal life ==
At the age of 19, he became a father, a circumstance that significantly impacted his choice to prioritize family support over further education while pursuing a career in boxing. He is commonly referred to as "Vaquero," a term meaning "Cowboy," a nickname passed down from his uncle and brothers. This name signifies his family heritage and ties to his origins, and Navarrete actively embraces it in both his personal and professional life.

== Titles in boxing ==
=== Major world titles ===
- WBO junior featherweight champion (122 lbs)
- WBO featherweight champion (126 lbs)
- WBO super featherweight champion (130 lbs)
- IBF super featherweight champion (130 lbs)

=== Regional/International titles ===
- Cinturón de Oro XVIII: flyweight champion (Note: Navarette actually lost the bout, but was given the title as his opponent Daniel Argueta failed to appear at the weigh-ins.) (112 lbs)

== See also ==
- List of male boxers
- List of Mexican boxing world champions
- List of world super-bantamweight boxing champions
- List of world featherweight boxing champions
- List of world super-featherweight boxing champions
- List of boxing triple champions

== Notes and references ==
=== Notes ===
Sporting positions
World boxing titles
Preceded by Isaac Dogboe	WBO junior featherweight champion 8 December 2018 – 11 July 2020; Vacated	Vacant Title next held by Angelo Leo
Vacant Title last held by Shakur Stevenson	WBO featherweight champion 9 October 2020 – 9 February 2023; Vacated	Vacant Title next held by Robeisy Ramírez
Vacant Title last held by Shakur Stevenson	WBO super featherweight champion 3 February 2023 – 24 October 2026	Succeeded by O'Shaquie Foster
Preceded by Eduardo Núñez	IBF super featherweight champion 28 February – 24 October 2026	Succeeded by O'Shaquie Foster
