= Luis Alberto Lopez =

Mexican boxer (born 1993)

Personal information
- Nickname: El Venado ("The Deer")
- Born: Luis Alberto Lopez Vargas; 21 August 1993 (age 33) Mexicali, Baja California, Mexico
- Height: 5 ft 4 in (163 cm)
- Weight: Featherweight

Boxing career
- Reach: 66 in (168 cm)
- Stance: Orthodox

Boxing record
- Total fights: 36
- Wins: 33
- Win by KO: 20
- Losses: 3

Luis Alberto Lopez Vargas (born 21 August 1993) is a Mexican professional boxer who held the International Boxing Federation (IBF) featherweight title from 2022 to 2024.

== Professional career ==
=== Early career ===
Lopez made his professional debut against Francisco Javier Pacheco on 6 November 2015. He won the fight by split decision. López Vargas amassed a 16–1 record during the next three years, winning half of those fights by way of stoppage. At the end of this run, Lopez-Vargas was booked to face Ray Ximenez for the vacant WBO International featherweight title on 28 February 2019. He wins his United States debut by technical decision, with scores of 80–72, 78–74 and 77–75. The fight was stopped after eight rounds, due to a cut above Ximenez's left eye, which was caused by an accidental clash of heads. Lopez-Vargas faced Ruben Villa on 10 May 2019, in the main event of the ShoBox: The New Generation, once again fighting for the vacant WBO International featherweight title. Villa handed Lopez-Vargas his second professional loss, winning the fight by unanimous decision, with scores of 97–93, 98–92 and 96–94.

After successfully bouncing back against two journeymen opponents, Israel Rojas on 30 August 2019 and Marco Antonio Monteros on 21 September 2019, Lopez was booked to face the undefeated Cristian Baez. Lopez-Vargas won the fight by a fifth-round technical knockout. Lopez next faced Andy Vences on 7 July 2020, at the MGM Grand in Las Vegas. Despite coming into the fight as an underdog, he won the fight by an upset split decision. The judges scored the fight 96–94 in his favor, while the third judge awarded the same scorecard to Vences. In his second fight of 2021, Lopez-Vargas faced the undefeated Gabriel Flores Jr. on 10 September 2021, and once again entered the fight in the role of an underdog. He won the fight by unanimous decision, with two judges scoring the fight 100–90 for Lopez-Vargas, while the third judge scored it 98–92 for him.

Following these two upset victories, Lopez was booked to face the undefeated Isaac Lowe in an IBF featherweight title eliminator bout. The fight took place at the York Hall in Bethnal Green on 3 December 2021, and was broadcast by ESPN+ and IFL TV. Lopez-Vargas won the fight by a seventh-round technical knockout. Lowe was floored with a body strike in the final minute of the seventh round, leaving him unable to beat the ten count. Lopez-Vargas knocked his opponent down twice prior to the stoppage, once in the first and once in the second round. Twenty days later, on 23 December 2021, Lopez-Vargas re-signed with Top Rank.

=== IBF featherweight champion ===
==== Lopez vs. Warrington ====
Lopez challenged the reigning IBF featherweight champion Josh Warrington on 10 December 2022, at the First Direct Arena in Leeds, England. He won the fight by majority decision. Judges Mike Fitzgerald and Adam Height scored the fight 115–113 in favor of Lopez, while judge Howard Foster scored it an even 114–114 draw. Lopez complained of what he perceived to be dirty tactics from Warrington in the post-fight interview, stating: "He even hit me on my legs. I don't think the referee did his job in protecting the fighters tonight". Aside from suffering a cut above his left eye due to a headbutt, it was furthermore revealed after the fight that Lopez had fractured his left thumb during the bout.

==== Lopez vs. Conlan ====
Lopez was booked to make his maiden title defense against Michael Conlan on 27 May 2023, at the SSE Arena in Belfast, Northern Ireland. He won the fight by a fifth-round knockout. Lopez floored his opponent with a right uppercut, which prompted Conlan's corner to immediately throw in the towel, as they judged their fighter to have take too much damage.

==== Lopez vs. Gonzalez ====
Lopez was booked to make a voluntary title defense of his IBF championship against Joet Gonzalez on 15 September 2023, at the American Bank Center in Corpus Christi, Texas. He retained the title by unanimous decision, with scores of 118–110, 117–111 and 116–112.

==== Lopez vs. Abe ====
Lopez was scheduled to make the third defense of his IBF featherweight title against Reiya Abe on 2 March 2024 in Verona, New York. He won the fight by TKO in the eighth round.

==== Lopez vs. Leo ====
Lopez made the fourth defense of his IBF featherweight title against Angelo Leo at Tingley Coliseum in Albuquerque, New Mexico on 10 August 2024. Lopez lost the fight and his IBF title by knockout in the tenth round.

==== Lopez vs. Montoya ====
Lopez made his return against Eduardo Montoya at Palenque del Fex in Mexicali, Mexico on 29 March 2025. He won the fight by KO in the first round.

==== Lopez vs. Lugo ====
Lopez knocked out Daniel Lugo in the third round at Frontwave Arena, Frontwave Arena, Oceanside, California, United States, on 11 September 2026.

== Professional boxing record ==
36 fights	33 wins	3 losses
By knockout	20	1
By decision	13	2

No.	Result	Record	Opponent	Type	Round, time	Date	Location	Notes
36	Win	33–3	Daniel Lugo	KO	3 (10), 1:18	11 September 2026	Frontwave Arena, Oceanside, California, U.S.	
35	Win	32–3	Miguel Arevalo Mejia	TKO	3 (10), 1:50	13 December 2025	Palenque del Fex, Mexicali, Mexico	
34	Win	31–3	Eduardo Montoya	KO	1 (10)	29 March 2025	Palenque del Fex, Mexicali, Mexico	
33	Loss	30–3	Angelo Leo	KO	10 (12), 1:16	10 August 2024	Tingley Coliseum, Albuquerque, New Mexico, U.S.	Lost IBF featherweight title
32	Win	30–2	Reiya Abe	TKO	8 (12), 0:39	2 March 2024	Turning Stone Resort & Casino, Verona, New York, U.S.	Retained IBF featherweight title
31	Win	29–2	Joet Gonzalez	UD	12	15 September 2023	American Bank Center, Corpus Christi, Texas, U.S.	Retained IBF featherweight title
30	Win	28–2	Michael Conlan	TKO	5 (12), 1:14	27 May 2023	SSE Arena, Belfast, Northern Ireland	Retained IBF featherweight title
29	Win	27–2	Josh Warrington	MD	12	10 December 2022	First Direct Arena, Leeds, England	Won IBF featherweight title
28	Win	26–2	Yeison Vargas	KO	2 (8), 1:25	20 August 2022	Pechanga Arena, San Diego, California, U.S.	
27	Win	25–2	Raul Chirino	KO	4 (8), 1:08	9 April 2022	The Hangar, Costa Mesa, California, U.S.	
26	Win	24–2	Isaac Lowe	KO	7 (12), 2:38	3 December 2021	York Hall, Bethnal Green, England	
25	Win	23–2	Gabriel Flores Jr.	UD	10	10 September 2021	Casino Del Sol, Tucson, Arizona, U.S.	
24	Win	22–2	Mauro Loreto	KO	1 (8), 0:58	18 March 2021	Preparatoria Maestros Federales, Mexicali, Mexico	
23	Win	21–2	Andy Vences	SD	10	7 July 2020	MGM Grand, Las Vegas, Nevada, U.S.	
22	Win	20–2	Cristian Baez	TKO	5 (10), 1:28	14 December 2019	Auditorio del Estado, Mexicali, Mexico	
21	Win	19–2	Marco Antonio Monteros	TKO	1 (6), 1:19	21 September 2019	Auditorio del Estado, Mexicali, Mexico	
20	Win	18–2	Israel Rojas	TKO	1 (8), 2:30	30 August 2019	Parque Vicente Guerrero, Mexicali, Mexico	
19	Loss	17–2	Ruben Villa	UD	10	10 May 2019	Omega Products International, Corona, California, U.S.	For vacant WBO International featherweight title
18	Win	17–1	Ray Ximenez	TD	8 (10)	28 February 2019	Yakama Legends Casino, Toppenish, Washington, U.S.	Won vacant WBO International featherweight title
17	Win	16–1	Yahir Patino	TKO	5 (6), 2:23	15 December 2018	Gimnasio Municipal, San Luis Rio Colorado, Mexico	
16	Win	15–1	Gregorio Torres	UD	6	9 November 2018	Parque Vicente Guerrero, Mexicali, Mexico	
15	Win	14–1	Luis Cueto Hernandez	TKO	2 (6), 2:37	29 September 2018	San Luis Río Colorado, Mexico	
14	Win	13–1	Marco Antonio Garcia Toledo	TKO	3 (6), 1:02	31 August 2018	Parque Vicente Guerrero, Mexicali, Mexico	
13	Loss	12–1	Abraham Montoya	SD	10	24 March 2018	Terraza del Sol del Parque Vicente Guerrero, Mexicali, Mexico	Lost Mexican Pacific Coast super featherweight title
12	Win	12–0	Andres Tapia	PTS	8	13 January 2018	Gimnasio de Mexicali, Mexicali, Mexico	
11	Win	11–0	Cristian Bielma	UD	10	28 October 2017	Gimnasio de Mexicali, Mexicali, Mexico	Won vacant Mexican Pacific Coast super featherweight title
10	Win	10–0	Marcelino Hernandez	KO	3 (8), 1:24	5 August 2017	Auditorio Municipal, Morelia, Mexico	
9	Win	9–0	Alfredo Mejia Vargas	TKO	6 (10)	3 March 2017	Gimnasio de Mexicali, Mexicali, Mexico	
8	Win	8–0	Zeus Valenzuela	UD	8	1 January 2017	Gimnasio de Mexicali, Mexicali, Mexico	
7	Win	7–0	Jose Pech	TKO	1 (4), 2:02	19 November 2016	Salon de Eventos del Hotel Posada del Sol, San Felipe, Mexico	
6	Win	6–0	Juan Antonio Rivera	KO	5 (6), 1:59	22 October 2016	Gimnasio de Mexicali, Mexicali, Mexico	
5	Win	5–0	Hector Cansdales	TKO	4 (6), 0:48	10 September 2016	Gimnasio de Mexicali, Mexicali, Mexico	
4	Win	4–0	Jovanni Saldana	UD	4	29 April 2016	Gimnasio de Mexicali, Mexicali, Mexico	
3	Win	3–0	Erik Adrian Leyva Ramos	UD	4	18 March 2016	Gimnasio de Mexicali, Mexicali, Mexico	
2	Win	2–0	Erick Torres Escobedo	UD	4	29 January 2016	Gimnasio de Mexicali, Mexicali, Mexico	
1	Win	1–0	Francisco Pacheco	SD	4	6 November 2015	Gimnasio de Mexicali, Mexicali, Mexico	

== See also ==
- List of world featherweight boxing champions
- List of Mexican boxing world champions

Sporting positions
World boxing titles
Preceded by Josh Warrington	IBF featherweight champion 10 December 2022 – present	Incumbent
