= Francisco De Vaca =

Mexican-American professional boxer

Personal information
- Nickname: Panchito El Centenario
- Nationality: American
- Born: Francisco De Vaca; January 30, 1995 (age 31) Michoacán de Ocampo, Mexico
- Height: 5 ft 7 in (170 cm)
- Weight: Super Bantamweight

Boxing career
- Reach: 65½″ in (166 cm)
- Stance: Orthodox

Boxing record
- Total fights: 21
- Wins: 20
- Win by KO: 6
- Losses: 1

Francisco De Vaca is a Mexican-American professional boxer.

De Vaca lost to Emanuel Navarrete for the WBO super bantamweight world title on August 17, 2019, by 3rd round technical knockout.

The bout was to be on the undercard to Jose Benavidez vs. Luis Collazo. However, the bout ended up headlining the first ever boxing event at Banc of California Stadium.

Upon the bout being made, De Vaca was ranked No. 11 by the WBO. By the night of the fight, he was ranked tenth by the WBO and was a 35-1 underdog.

== Professional boxing record ==
21 fights	20 wins	1 loss
By knockout	6	1
By decision	14	0

No.	Result	Record	Opponent	Type	Round, time	Date	Location	Notes
21	Loss	20–1	Emanuel Navarrete	KO	3 (12), 1:54	Aug 17, 2019	BMO Stadium, Los Angeles, California, U.S.	For WBO super bantamweight title
20	Win	20–0	Ernesto Guerrero	UD	8	Feb 23, 2019	Celebrity Theater, Phoenix, Arizona, U.S.	
19	Win	19–0	Jesús Serrano	UD	8	Aug 25, 2018	Gila River Arena, Glendale, Arizona, U.S.	
18	Win	18–0	Christian Esquivel	KO	6 (10), 1:59	Feb 24, 2018	Celebrity Theater, Phoenix, Arizona, U.S.	
17	Win	17–0	Víctor Proa	UD	10	Sep 2, 2017	Celebrity Theater, Phoenix, Arizona, U.S.	
16	Win	16–0	José Estrella	UD	8	Sep 3, 2016	Celebrity Theater, Phoenix, Arizona, U.S.	
15	Win	15–0	Gustavo Molina	TKO	8 (8), 2:49	May 20, 2016	Celebrity Theater, Phoenix, Arizona, U.S.	Won vacant WBC-NABF Junior super bantamweight title
14	Win	14–0	Cesár García	UD	6	Jan 29, 2016	Quiet Cannon, Montebello, California, U.S.	
13	Win	13–0	Ricardo Proano	UD	6	Oct 17, 2015	Celebrity Theater, Phoenix, Arizona, U.S.	
12	Win	12–0	José Silveria	UD	6	Jul 25, 2015	Celebrity Theater, Phoenix, Arizona, U.S.	
11	Win	11–0	Ángel Monrreal	UD	6	May 15, 2015	US Airway Center, Phoenix, Arizona, U.S.	
10	Win	10–0	Saul Eduardo Hernández	UD	6	Feb 28, 2015	Celebrity Theater, Phoenix, Arizona, U.S.	
9	Win	9–0	Jesús Navarro	UD	6	Dec 20, 2014	Celebrity Theater, Phoenix, Arizona, U.S.	
8	Win	8–0	Víctor Serrano	UD	6	Sep 20, 2014	Celebrity Theater, Phoenix, Arizona, U.S.	
7	Win	7–0	Ernesto Guerrero	UD	6	Jul 26, 2014	Celebrity Theater, Phoenix, Arizona, U.S.	
6	Win	6–0	Rafael Rivera	TKO	2 (6), 1:57	Apr 26, 2014	Celebrity Theater, Phoenix, Arizona, U.S.	
5	Win	5–0	Luis Almendarez	UD	4	Feb 22, 2014	Celebrity Theater, Phoenix, Arizona, U.S.	
4	Win	4–0	Juan Carlos Benavides	UD	4	Nov 16, 2013	Celebrity Theater, Phoenix, Arizona, U.S.	
3	Win	3–0	Manuel Galaviz	KO	1 (4)	Sep 21, 2013	Celebrity Theater, Phoenix, Arizona, U.S.	
2	Win	2–0	Michael James Herrera	TKO	2 (4), 1:14	Jul 20, 2013	Celebrity Theater, Phoenix, Arizona, U.S.	
1	Win	1–0	Martin Mendez	TKO	2 (4), 0:56	May 17, 2013	Celebrity Theater, Phoenix, Arizona, U.S.	
