= Hinata Maruta =

Japanese boxer (born 1997)

Hinata Maruta 丸田陽七太
Personal information
- Nationality: Japanese
- Born: 18 April 1997 (age 29) Kawanishi, Hyōgo, Japan
- Height: 5 ft 9 in (175 cm)
- Weight: Bantamweight; Super-bantamweight; Featherweight

Boxing career
- Stance: Orthodox

Boxing record
- Total fights: 15
- Wins: 12
- Win by KO: 9
- Losses: 2
- Draws: 1

Hinata Maruta (Japanese: 丸田陽七太, Maruta Hinata; born 18 April 1997) is a Japanese professional boxer.

== Professional boxing career ==
=== Early career ===
==== Bantamweight ====
Maruta made his professional debut against Jason Canoy on 22 November 2015. He won the fight by unanimous decision, with scores of 59–54, 59–56 and 58–55. Maruta faced the debuting Saranyu Kerdsuk in his second professional appearance, on 20 March 2016. He won the fight by a first-round technical knockout.

Maruta was scheduled to fight the undefeated 10–0 Wilbert Berondo for the vacant WBC Youth bantamweight title on 31 July 2016, at the Sumiyoshi Ward Center in Osaka, Japan. Maruta won the fight by a sixth-round technical knockout, flooring the shorter Bedondo with a right hook to the liver. He was up on all three of the judges' scorecards at the time of the stoppage.

Maruta made his first WBC Youth title defense against Joe Tejones on 23 November 2016, at the Sumiyoshi SportsCenter in Osaka, Japan. He won the fight by a seventh-round knockout. Maruta dropped Tejones with a body shot, which left the Filipino challenger unable to beat the ten count. Maruta made his second title defense against Hamson Lamandau on 26 March 2017. He won the fight by a sixth-round knockout, flooring Lamandau with a barrage of body strikes.

==== Super bantamweight ====
Maruta challenged the 36-year old OPBF super bantamweight champion Hidenori Otake on 13 October 2017. Although the fight started out evenly, Otake began to take over from the fifth round onward, and won the fight by unanimous decision. Two judges scored the fight 116–112 for Otake, while the third judge scored the fight 117–111 in his favor. During the post-fight interview, Maruta revealed that he had fractured his the middle finger of his left hand, stating: "It's my fault that I hurt my left hand. I can't say anything if I lose... If we fight again, I can winm I think".

Maruta remained at super bantamweight for his next three bouts as well. After easily beating the over-matched and debuting Ratipong Laobankho by a first-round knockout on 21 December 2017, Maruta was booked to face Arega Yunian on 22 April 2018. He won the fight by a third-round knockout. Maruta was next scheduled to face the interim OPBF super bantamweight champion Ben Mananquil on 23 August 2018. The fight was ruled a split draw. Two of the judges awarded a 77–75 scorecard to Manaquil and Maruta each, while the third judge scored the fight an even 76–76 draw.

=== Featherweight ===
==== Early featherweight career ====
Maruta moved up to featherweight in order to face Tsuyoshi Tameda on 3 December 2018. He won the fight by a fifth-round technical knockout. Maruta dropped Tameda at the midway point of the round with a one-two, and finished him with a flurry of punches after the fight resumed. Maruta faced the experienced Coach Hiroto on May 1, 2019. He won his second fight at a new weight by unanimous decision, with all three judges scoring the fight 80–72 for him. Maruta was next scheduled to face the former Japanese featherweight champion Takenori Ohashi in a title eliminator for that very same belt. The fight headlined "The Strongest Challenger" event on 26 October 2019, which featured three other title eliminators. Maruta won the fight by a third-round technical knockout. He managed to inflict enough damage to Ohashi to open a cut on the bridge of his nose, which forced the ringside physician to stop the bout.

==== Japanese featherweight champion ====
Maruta challenged the reigning Japanese featherweight champion Ryo Sagawa, in what was Sagawa's third title defense. The fight took place on 11 February 2021, at the Korakuen Hall in Tokyo, Japan. Despite coming into the fight as a slight underdog, Maruta won the fight by a seventh-round technical knockout. Maruta was able to floor Sagawa with a counter right straight near the end of the seventh round. Although Sagawa was able to beat the count, he was finished with a flurry of punches after the action resumed.

Maruta was booked to make his first Japanese title defense against the #8 ranked Japanese featherweight contender Ryo Hino. The bout was scheduled as the main event of "Dangan 246", which took place at the Korakuen Hall in Tokyo, Japan on 27 November 2021. Maruta retained the title by unanimous decision. Two of the judges scored the fight 97–91 in his favor, while the third judge scored it 96–92 for him. Maruta knocked the challenger down twice, the first time with a right straight near the end of the third round, and the second time with a flurry of punches in the fifth round.

Maruta was booked to make his second Japanese featherweight title defense against the mandatory challenger Reiya Abe on 15 May 2022, at the Sumida Ward General Gymnasium in Sumida, Tokyo. Aside from the Japanese title, the vacant WBO Asia Pacific featherweight strap was on the line as well. He lost the fight by unanimous decision, with scores of 118–109, 116–111 and 115–112.

=== Super lightweight ===
Maruta was expected to face Hong Quan Dinh for the WBO Oriental super lightweight title on 21 April 2023, at the Intercontinental Hotel in Ho Chi Minh City, Vietnam. The bout was cancelled on the day of weigh-ins, as Dinh had complications while cutting weight.

== Professional boxing record ==
15 fights	12 wins	2 losses
By knockout	9	0
By decision	3	2
Draws	1	

No.	Result	Record	Opponent	Type	Round, time	Date	Location	Notes
15	Loss	12–2–1	Reiya Abe	UD	12	15 May 2022	Sumida Ward General Gymnasium, Sumida, Tokyo, Japan	Lost Japanese featherweight title For vacant WBO Asia Pacific featherweight title
14	Win	12–1–1	Ryo Hino	UD	10	27 Nov 2021	Korakuen Hall, Tokyo, Japan	Retained Japanese featherweight title
13	Win	11–1–1	Ryo Sagawa	TKO	7 (10), 2:57	11 Feb 2021	Korakuen Hall, Tokyo, Japan	Won Japanese featherweight title
12	Win	10–1–1	Takenori Ohashi	TKO	3 (8), 2:00	26 Oct 2019	Korakuen Hall, Tokyo, Japan	
11	Win	9–1–1	Coach Hiroto	UD	8	1 May 2019	Korakuen Hall, Tokyo, Japan	
10	Win	8–1–1	Tsuyoshi Tameda	TKO	5 (10), 2:16	3 Dec 2018	Korakuen Hall, Tokyo, Japan	
9	Draw	7–1–1	Ben Mananquil	SD	8	23 Aug 2018	The Flash Grand Ballroom of the Elorde Sports Complex, Paranaque City, Philippines	
8	Win	7–1	Arega Yunian	KO	3 (8), 1:55	22 Apr 2018	City Gym, Paranaque City, Japan	
7	Win	6–1	Ratipong Laobankho	TKO	1 (8), 1:51	21 Dec 2017	Meenayothin Camp, Bangkok, Thailand	
6	Loss	5–1	Hidenori Otake	UD	12	13 Oct 2017	Korakuen Hall, Tokyo, Japan	For OPBF super bantamweight title
5	Win	5–0	Hamson Lamandau	KO	6 (10), 1:56	26 Mar 2017	Satsukiyama Gym, Ikeda, Japan	Retained WBC Youth bantamweight title
4	Win	4–0	Joe Tejones	KO	7 (10), 2:25	23 Nov 2016	Sumiyoshi SportsCenter, Osaka, Japan	Retained WBC Youth bantamweight title
3	Win	3–0	Wilbert Berondo	KO	6 (10), 3:03	31 Jul 2016	Sumiyoshi Ward Center, Osaka, Japan	Won vacant WBC Youth bantamweight title
2	Win	2–0	Saranyu Kerdsuk	TKO	1 (6), 1:54	20 Mar 2016	Satsukiyama Gym, Ikeda, Japan	
1	Win	1–0	Jason Canoy	UD	6	22 Nov 2015	Sumiyoshi SportsCenter, Osaka, Japan	
