= Alexei Collado =

Cuban boxer (born 1988)

Personal information
- Nickname: The Hurricane
- Born: Alexei Collado Acosta; 13 February 1988 (age 38) Havana, Cuba
- Weight: Super bantamweight; Featherweight; Lightweight

Boxing career
- Stance: Orthodox

Boxing record
- Total fights: 29
- Wins: 26
- Win by KO: 23
- Losses: 3
Medal record
Men's amateur boxing
Representing Cuba
World Junior Championships
Gold medal – first place	2006 Agadir	Flyweight

Alexei Collado Acosta (born 13 February 1988) is a Cuban professional boxer. As an amateur he won a gold medal in the flyweight division at the 2006 Junior World Championships.

== Amateur career ==
In 2006 he won fights against Khalid Saeed Yafai and Luis Yanez in Agadir for the Junior World title. In 2007 and 2008 he lost at the senior national championships due to a loss to Andry Laffita.

== Professional career ==
In 2008 he joined Ismaikel Pérez and Luis Garcia to turn professional at super bantamweight in Ireland.
