= Albania at the 2018 Summer Youth Olympics =

- IOC code: ALB
- NOC: Albanian National Olympic Committee
- Website: nocalbania.org.al

in Buenos Aires, Argentina 6 – 18 October 2018
- Competitors: 5 in 4 sports
- Flag bearer: Elsidita Selaj
- Medals: Gold 0 Silver 0 Bronze 0 Total 0

Summer Youth Olympics appearances (overview)
- 2010; 2014; 2018

Albania participated at the 2018 Summer Youth Olympics in Buenos Aires, Argentina from 6 October to 18 October 2018.

== Athletics ==
Athlete	Event	Stage 1		Stage 2		Total	
Athlete	Event	Result	Rank	Result	Rank	Result	Rank
Relaksa Dauti	800 m	2:16.98	18	2:18.09	18	4:35.07	16

== Boxing ==
Boys

Athlete	Event	Preliminary R1	Preliminary R2	Semifinals	Final / RM	Rank
Athlete	Event	Opposition Result	Opposition Result	Opposition Result	Opposition Result	Rank
Muhamet Qamili	-56 kg	Cuello (ARG); L 2–3	Khalokov (UZB); L 0–5	Did not advance	Amram (NRU); W WO	5

Girl

Athlete	Event	Preliminaries	Semifinals	Final / RM	Rank
Athlete	Event	Opposition Result	Opposition Result	Opposition Result	Rank
Elsidita Selaj	-75 kg	Brillaux (FRA); L 0-5	did not advance		5

== Swimming ==
Athlete	Event	Heat		Semifinal		Final	
Athlete	Event	Time	Rank	Time	Rank	Time	Rank
Katie Rock	Girls' 400 m freestyle	4:50.72	26	—		Did not advance	

== Weightlifting ==
Athlete	Event	Snatch		Clean & Jerk		Total	Rank
Athlete	Event	Result	Rank	Result	Rank	Total	Rank
Antonino Luli	−62 kg	95	9	125	8	220	9
