= Jessie Magdaleno =

American boxer

Personal information
- Nickname: Mambaco
- Born: Jesús Gabriel Magdaleno; 8 November 1991 (age 34) Pomona, California, U.S.
- Height: 5 ft 4 in (163 cm)
- Weight: Super bantamweight; Featherweight

Boxing career
- Reach: 66 in (168 cm)
- Stance: Southpaw

Boxing record
- Total fights: 33
- Wins: 30
- Win by KO: 19
- Losses: 3

Jesús Gabriel "Jessie" Magdaleno (born November 8, 1991) is an American professional boxer who held the WBO junior featherweight title from 2016 to 2018. He is the younger brother of boxer Diego Magdaleno.

== Amateur career ==
Magdaleno was one of the best amateur fighters in America, finishing his amateur career with a 120–16 record. In 2009 Magdaleno won both the United States National Championship by beating Rau'shee Warren and won the National Golden Gloves Championship by beating Antonio Nieves (among others) in the Bantamweight division.

== Professional career ==
Magdaleno is signed to Bob Arum's Top Rank.

On June 6, 2012, Magdaleno knocked out Puerto Rican veteran Carlos Valcárcel in the first round. The bout was televised on ESPN's Friday Night Fights.

On 5 November 2016, Magdaleno faced Nonito Donaire in his first ever bid to win a world title. The fight was very close, but the judges gave Magdaleno the win with controversial scores of 118–110, 116-112 and 116–112 in favor of the challenger.

In his first title defense, Magdaleno managed to make easy work out of challenger Adeilson Dos Santos. Midway through the second round, Magdaleno managed to drop Dos Santos. Dos Santos beat the count, but Magdaleno threw a flurry of shots to drop him again. This was enough for the referee to stop the fight at 2:51.

In his next fight, he faced the young talented fighter from Ghana, Isaac Dogboe. Magdaleno started off strong, dropping Dogboe in the opening round. Dogboe managed to recover and the fight went on. In the fifth round, Dogboe returned the favor and dropped Magdaleno with a heavy right hand. The champion was visibly hurt, and even though he managed to continue the fight, Dogboe was clearly winning the fight. In the 11th round, Dogboe would drop Magdaleno two more times, forcing the referee to stop the fight.

After his first professional loss, Magdaleno fought and defeated former world titlist Rico Ramos.

On 17 August 2019, Magdaleno faced Rafael Riviera. In an entertaining fight, Magdaleno managed to first drop Riviera at the beginning of the ninth round. In the same round, an accidental elbow by Riviera caused a bad cut over Magdaleno's right eye. The ringside physician ruled that the cut was too severe for the fight to continue. Magdaleno was awarded a technical decision win.

On June 11, 2020, Magdaleno fought Dominican fighter Yenifel Vicente. Magdaleno had his way with his opponent, dropping him twice, once in the first, and once in the fifth round. Vicente also lost four points for his low blows on Magdaleno. When Vicente went for another low blow in the tenth round, the referee had seen enough of it, and stopped the fight, awarding Magdaleno a DQ win.

=== Magdaleno vs. Figueroa ===
On May 4, 2024 in Las Vegas, Magdaleno was scheduled to challenge Brandon Figueroa for his interim WBC featherweight title. He lost the fight by knockout in the ninth round with body shot.

== Professional boxing record ==
32 fights	29 wins	3 losses
By knockout	18	2
By decision	10	1
By disqualification	1	0

No.	Result	Record	Opponent	Type	Round, time	Date	Location	Notes
32	Loss	29–3	Brandon Figueroa	KO	9 (12), 2:59	May 4, 2024	T-Mobile Arena, Paradise, Nevada, U.S.	For WBC interim featherweight title
31	Loss	29–2	Raymond Ford	UD	12	Apr 8, 2023	Boeing Center at Tech Port, San Antonio, Texas, U.S.	
30	Win	29–1	Edy Valencia Mercado	UD	8	May 21, 2022	Resorts World, Winchester, Nevada, U.S.	
29	Win	28–1	Yenifel Vicente	DQ	10 (10), 1:38	Jun 11, 2020	MGM Grand Conference Center, Paradise, Nevada, U.S.	Vicente disqualified for repeated low blows
28	Win	27–1	Rafael Rivera	TD	9 (10), 2:55	Aug 17, 2019	Banc of California Stadium, Los Angeles, California, U.S.	Unanimous TD after Magdelano cut from accidental elbow
27	Win	26–1	Rico Ramos	UD	10	Mar 23, 2019	The Hangar, Costa Mesa, California, U.S.	
26	Loss	25–1	Isaac Dogboe	TKO	11 (12), 1:38	Apr 28, 2018	Liacouras Center, Philadelphia, Pennsylvania, U.S.	Lost WBO super bantamweight title
25	Win	25–0	Adeilson Dos Santos	KO	2 (12), 2:51	Apr 22, 2017	StubHub Center, Carson, California, U.S.	Retained WBO super bantamweight title
24	Win	24–0	Nonito Donaire	UD	12	Nov 5, 2016	Thomas & Mack Center, Paradise, Nevada, U.S.	Won WBO super bantamweight title
23	Win	23–0	Rey Perez	KO	7 (10), 2:51	Feb 21, 2016	Celebrity Theatre, Phoenix, Arizona, U.S.	
22	Win	22–0	Vergel Nebran	KO	1 (10), 2:22	Oct 17, 2015	Celebrity Theatre, Phoenix, Arizona, U.S.	
21	Win	21–0	Raul Hirales	UD	8	May 1, 2015	The Cosmopolitan, Chelsea Ballroom, Paradise, Nevada, U.S.	
20	Win	20–0	Erik Ruiz	UD	8	Jan 10, 2015	Texas Station, Paradise, Nevada, U.S.	
19	Win	19–0	Carlos Rodriguez	TKO	7 (8), 2:45	Aug 2, 2014	Cosmopolitan of Las Vegas, Paradise, Nevada, U.S.	
18	Win	18–0	Roberto Castaneda	TKO	5 (8), 2:48	Feb 15, 2014	C. Robert Lee Center, Hawaiian Gardens, California, U.S.	
17	Win	17–0	Raul Hidalgo	TKO	3 (8), 2:55	Oct 11, 2013	Thomas & Mack Center, Paradise, Nevada, U.S.	
16	Win	16–0	Luis Maldonado	KO	3 (8), 1:10	Aug 24, 2013	Civic Auditorium, Glendale, California, U.S.	
15	Win	15–0	Henry Maldonado	TKO	4 (8), 2:53	Jun 8, 2013	Hard Rock Hotel & Casino, Paradise, Nevada, U.S.	
14	Win	14–0	Carlos Fulgencio	KO	3 (8), 0:45	Mar 16, 2013	Home Depot Center, Carson, California, U.S.	
13	Win	13–0	Jonathan Arrellano	UD	8	Dec 6, 2012	Mirage Resort & Casino, Paradise, Nevada, U.S.	Won vacant WBO-NABO Youth junior featherweight title
12	Win	12–0	Jose Silveira	KO	1 (8), 2:59	Nov 10, 2012	Wynn Resort, Paradise, Nevada, U.S.	
11	Win	11–0	Aldimar Silva	TKO	2 (8), 2:54	Aug 3, 2012	Texas Station, Paradise, Nevada, U.S.	
10	Win	10–0	Carlos Valcárcel	TKO	1 (8), 2:25	Jul 8, 2012	Hard Rock Hotel & Casino, Paradise, Nevada, U.S.	
9	Win	9–0	Nick Fast	KO	1 (6), 2:07	Apr 28, 2012	Fairplex, Pomona, California, U.S.	
8	Win	8–0	Shawn Nichol	UD	6	Jan 13, 2012	Hard Rock Hotel & Casino, Paradise, Nevada, U.S.	
7	Win	7–0	Gil Garcia	TKO	1 (6), 2:40	Nov 11, 2011	Mandalay Bay Resort & Casino, Paradise, Nevada, U.S.	
6	Win	6–0	Isaac Hidalgo	RTD	1 (6), 3:00	Oct 1, 2011	MGM Grand, Marquee Ballroom, Paradise, Nevada, U.S.	
5	Win	5–0	Esteban Nichol	UD	6	Jul 15, 2011	Texas Station, Paradise, Nevada, U.S.	
4	Win	4–0	Jonathan Alcantara	UD	6	May 6, 2011	Mandalay Bay Resort & Casino, Paradise, Nevada, U.S.	
3	Win	3–0	Jamie Gutierrez	TKO	1 (4), 2:12	Feb 26, 2011	Palms Casino Resort, Paradise, Nevada, U.S.	
2	Win	2–0	Cain Garcia	TKO	3 (4), 2:14	Jan 22, 2011	Texas Station, Paradise, Nevada, U.S.	
1	Win	1–0	Matthew Salazar	TKO	1 (4), 1:38	Nov 6, 2010	MGM Grand Garden Arena, Las Vegas, Paradise, Nevada, U.S.	

== See also ==
- List of southpaw stance boxers
- Notable boxing families
- List of Mexican boxing world champions
- List of world super-bantamweight boxing champions

Sporting positions
Amateur boxing titles
Previous: Ronny Rios	U.S. bantamweight champion 2009	Next: Rau'shee Warren
Previous: Ernesto Garza	Golden Gloves bantamweight champion 2009	Next: Toka Kahn-Clary
Regional boxing titles
Vacant Title last held by Rico Ramos	NABO Youth super-bantamweight champion December 6, 2012 – November 5, 2016; Won world title	Vacant
Vacant Title last held by Isaac Zarate	NABF Junior super-bantamweight champion January 10, 2015 – 2016; Vacated	Vacant Title next held by Francisco De Vaca
Vacant Title last held by Ronell Green	WBC-USNBC featherweight champion March 23, 2019 – 2019; Vacated	Vacant Title next held by Edward Vazquez
World boxing titles
Preceded by Nonito Donaire	WBO super-bantamweight champion November 5, 2016 – 28 April 2018	Succeeded by Isaac Dogboe
