= Vincent Astrolabio =

Filipino boxer (born 1997)

Personal information
- Nickname: Asero (Steel)
- Born: Vincent Diazen Astrolabio; April 1, 1997 (age 29) General Santos City, Cotabato del Sur, Philippines
- Height: 1.65 m (5 ft 5 in)
- Weight: Super Flyweight; Bantamweight

Boxing career
- Reach: 166.37 cm (66 in)
- Stance: Orthodox

Boxing record
- Total fights: 26
- Wins: 20
- Win by KO: 15
- Losses: 6

Vincent Astrolabio (born April 1, 1997) is a Filipino professional boxer who held the WBO Inter-continental and WBC International Bantamweight titles from 2022 to 2023, he challenged for the WBO Bantamweight title in 2023.

== Professional career ==
=== Super flyweight ===
==== Debut ====
On August 14, 2015, Astrolabio made his debut against Argie Emendo in SM City Annex of Davao City, Philippines. He won the match by technical knockout.

==== Astrolabio vs. He ====
On December 15, 2018, Astrolabio fought for the vacant WBO Asia Pacific Youth Super Flyweight title against Zhongli He in Yubei, China. Astrolabio lost via majority decision with the score of 95-95 and 94–96(x2) in favor of He.

=== Bantamweight ===
==== Astrolabio vs. Tejones ====
After 8 consecutive wins, on July 24, 2017, Astrolabio fought against Joe Tejones (8–3–0) for the vacant Philippines Mindanao Professional Boxing Federation (MinProBa) bantamweight title. In a full 10 rounder bout, Astrolabio won via unanimous decision with the scores of 96–93 and 98–91(×2), winning the title.

==== Astrolabio vs. Kobayashi ====
On July 15, 2018, Astrolabio fought Japan's Yuki Strong Kobayashi in the undercard of Manny Pacquiao vs. Lucas Matthysse at Axiata Arena, Kuala Lumpur, Malaysia. He lost the match via technical knockout in the 4th round.

==== Astrolabio vs. Liukhoto ====
After his loss against Zhongli He, Astrolabio moved up to bantamweight to fight the undefeated Patrick Liukhoto of Indonesia for the vacant WBO Oriental bantamweight title in Jakarta, Indonesia. Astrolabio won via technical knockout, making him the new WBO Oriental bantamweight champion.

He then defended the title twice, winning both fights, one via 5th round stoppage against Kevin Aseniero and the other via a body shot knockout against Wilbert Berondo.

==== Astrolabio vs. Rigondeaux ====
Astrolabio fought Guillermo Rigondeaux for the vacant WBC International bantamweight title in Dubai, Astrolabio won via unanimous decision.

==== Astrolabio vs. Potapov ====
After winning against Rigondeaux, Astrolabio was given a chance to fight Russian Nikolai Potapov for the vacant WBO Intercontinental belt, the fight was Astrolabio's debut in the United States. After flooring Potapov in round 1 and 5, Astrolabio knocked him out in the sixth round, winning the title.

==== Astrolabio vs. Moloney ====
After Naoya Inoue vacated all of his bantamweight major titles to move up to super bantamweight, Astrolabio fought Jason Moloney for the vacant WBO bantamweight title, but lost via majority decision.

==== Astrolabio vs. Kaikanha ====
On July 20, 2023, the World Boxing Council (WBC) issued an order for a bantamweight title eliminator bout between Astrolabio and the #1 ranked Nawaphon Kaikanha. The winner of this contest was slated to face the mandatory titleholder, Alexandro Santiago. The match occurred as the main event of "NKL Boxing" on August 26, 2023, at Suan Lum Night Bazaar Ratchadaphisek in Bangkok, Thailand, with live coverage provided by Thairath TV.

During the course of the match, both fighters exhibited notable progress. In the 11th round, Astrolabio delivered a powerful counter right punch that knocked Kaikanha down. Although Kaikanha managed to rise to his feet, the referee intervened moments later and halted the contest, earning Astrolabio a victory via technical knockout.

==== Astrolabio vs. Nakatani ====
Astrolabio is scheduled to challenge Junto Nakatani for his WBC bantamweight title at Ryōgoku Kokugikan in Tokyo, Japan on July 20, 2024.

== Professional boxing record ==
26 fights	20 wins	6 losses
By knockout	15	3
By decision	5	3

No.	Result	Record	Opponent	Type	Round, Time	Date	Location	Notes
26	Loss	20–6	Katsuma Akitsugi	TKO	7 (10), 2:35	7 Nov 2025	RP Funding Center, Lakeland, Florida, U.S.	
25	Win	20–5	Kwanpichit OnesongchaiGym	KO	1 (10), 2:27	10 Apr 2025	Elorde Sports Center, Parañaque, Philippines	
24	Loss	19–5	Junto Nakatani	KO	1 (12), 2:37	20 Jul 2024	Ryōgoku Kokugikan, Tokyo, Japan	For WBC bantamweight title
23	Win	19–4	Nawaphon Kaikanha	TKO	11 (12)	26 Aug 2023	Suan Lum Night Bazaar Ratchadaphisek, Bangkok, Thailand	
22	Loss	18–4	Jason Moloney	MD	12	13 May 2023	Stockton Arena, Stockton, California, US	For vacant WBO bantamweight title
21	Win	18–3	Nikolai Potapov	KO	6 (12), 1:26	17 Dec 2022	The Cosmopolitan of Las Vegas, Chelsea Ballroom, Las Vegas, Nevada, US	Won vacant WBO Inter-Continental bantamweight title
20	Win	17–3	Guillermo Rigondeaux	UD	10	26 Feb 2022	Dubai Marina, Dubai, UAE	Won vacant WBC International bantamweight title
19	Win	16–3	Jerry Pabila	TKO	1 (8), 2:29	27 Feb 2021	Bula Gym, General Santos City, Philippines	
18	Win	15–3	Wilbert Berondo	KO	8 (10), 1:33	15 Dec 2019	Robinson's Mall Atrium, General Santos City, Philippines	Retained WBO Oriental Bantamweight title
17	Win	14–3	Kevin Aseniero	TKO	5 (10)	24 Aug 2019	San Andres Civic & Sports Center, District of Malate, Manila, Philippines	Retained WBO Oriental Bantamweight title
16	Win	13–3	Patrick Liukhoto	TKO	9 (12)	6 Apr 2019	Kampus IBM ASMI, Jakarta, Indonesia	Won vacant WBO Oriental bantamweight title
15	Loss	12–3	ZongLi He	MD	10	15 Dec 2018	Yubei Sport Center, Yubei, China	For vacant WBO Asia Pacific Youth super flyweight title
14	Win	12–2	Yochanchai Yokaeo	KO	1 (8), 2:06	14 Oct 2018	Robinsons Place, Butuan, Philippines	
13	Loss	11–2	Yuki Strong Kobayashi	TKO	4 (8), 1:40	15 Jul 2018	Axiata Arena, Kuala Lumpur, Malaysia	
12	Win	11–1	Jun Eraham	UD	8	25 Mar 2018	Gaisano Mall of Toril, Davao City, Philippines	
11	Loss	10–1	John Mark Apolinario	UD	8	17 Dec 2017	Robinson's Mall Atrium, General Santos City, Philippines	
10	Win	10–0	Ayati Sailike	UD	8	29 Sep 2017	Heyuan Royal Garden Hotel, Beijing, China	
9	Win	9–0	Joe Tejones	UD	10	24 Jul 2017	South Cotabato Gym, Koronadal City, Philippines	Won vacant Philippines Mindanao Professional Boxing Federation (MinProBA) bantamweight title
8	Win	8–0	Nicardo Calamba	TKO	2 (10), 0:23	12 May 2017	Waterfront Insular Hotel, Davao City, Philippines	
7	Win	7–0	Renante Suacasa	TKO	8 (10), 2:59	17 Dec 2016	Robinson's Place, General Santos City, Philippines	
6	Win	6–0	Marlou Sandoval	KO	2 (10), 0:37	23 Aug 2016	Kidapawan City Gymnasium, Barangay Amas, Kidapawan City, Philippines	
5	Win	5–0	Renante Suacasa	UD	8	4 Jun 2016	Almendras Gym, Davao City, Philippines	
4	Win	4–0	Jun Eraham	TKO	5 (8), 1:06	1 Apr 2016	M'lang Municipal Gymnasium, M'lang, Philippines	
3	Win	3–0	Lowell Saguisa	KO	1 (6)	23 Jan 2016	Hagonoy Sports Complex, Taguig City, Philippines	
2	Win	2–0	Bener Santig	TKO	3 (6), 0:55	13 Nov 2015	Philippine Navy Gymnasium Bonifacio Naval Station, Taguig City, Philippines	
1	Win	1–0	Argie Emendo	TKO	1 (4), 2:19	14 Aug 2015	SM City Annex, Ecoland, Davao City, Philippines	

== Titles in boxing ==
=== Regional and minor titles ===
- MinProBa Bantamweight title (July 24, 2017)
- WBO Oriental Bantamweight title (April 6, 2019)
- WBC International Bantamweight title (February 26, 2022)
- WBO Inter-continental Bantamweight title (December 17, 2022)
