= Mikito Nakano =

Japanese professional boxer

Personal information
- Nationality: Japanese
- Born: 中野幹士; 14 July 1995 (age 30) Hiroshima, Hiroshima, Japan
- Height: 5 ft 7 in (170 cm)
- Weight: Featherweight

Boxing career
- Stance: Southpaw

Boxing record
- Total fights: 16
- Wins: 15
- Win by KO: 14
- Losses: 1

Mikito Nakano (中野幹士, Nakano Mikito, born July 14, 1995) is a Japanese professional boxer. He currently competes in the featherweight division where he is the current Oriental and Pacific Boxing Federation Feather champion.

== Amateur career ==
As an amateur Nakano represented the Tokyo University of Agriculture. Domestically he won numerous Japanese domestic titles. He finished up with a record of 68–8.

== Professional career ==
=== Nakano vs Piala ===
Nakano claimed the first title of his career when he beat Bryx Piala of the Philippines for the vacant OPBF featherweight title. Nakano landed a crushing body shot in the fourth round and Piala failed to beat the count.

=== Nakano vs Hanabusa ===
He made the first defence of his title against fellow Japanese boxer Hiroki Hanabusa. Nakano dominated the fight, dropping Hanabusa twice and stopping him the third round. His promoter Akihiko Honda praised his performance.

=== Nakano vs Medina ===
On 4 May 2025, Nakano faced Pedro Marquez Medina (15-2) at T-Mobile Arena in Paradise, Nevada, USA, for his first fight outside of Japan. He won the fight by technical knockout in the fourth round.

=== Nakano vs Aguan ===
Nakano stopped Jing Aguan in the second round of their scheduled 10-round fight at Korakuen Hall in Tokyo on 2 August 2025.

=== Nakano vs Aleem ===
On 24 November 2025, Nakano fought Ra'eese Aleem at Toyota Arena in Tokyo in an eliminator for a shot at the IBF featherweight title. He lost via unanimous decision to suffer the first defeat of his professional career.

=== Nakano vs Dlamini ===
Nakano defeated Lerato Dlamini by technical knockout in the fourth round of their contest at Korakuen Hall in Tokyo on 6 May 2026.

== Professional boxing record ==
15 fights	14 wins	1 loss
By knockout	13	0
By decision	1	1

No.	Result	Record	Opponent	Type	Round, time	Date	Location	Notes
16	Win	15–1	Lerato Dlamini	TKO	4 (10), 0:58	6 May 2026	Korakuen Hall, Tokyo, Japan	
15	Loss	14–1	Ra'eese Aleem	UD	12	24 Nov 2025	Toyota Arena, Tokyo, Japan	
14	Win	14–0	Jing Aguan	TKO	2 (10), 1:50	2 Aug 2025	Korakuen Hall, Tokyo, Japan	
13	Win	13–0	Pedro Marquez Medina	TKO	4 (10), 1:58	4 May 2025	T-Mobile Arena, Paradise, Nevada, U.S.	
12	Win	12–0	Hiroki Hanabusa	KO	3 (12), 2:05	18 Jan 2025	Korakuen Hall, Tokyo, Japan	Retained OPBF featherweight title
11	Win	11–0	Bryx Piala	KO	4 (12), 0:34	7 Sep 2024	Korakuen Hall, Tokyo, Japan	Won vacant OPBF featherweight title
10	Win	10–0	Sathaporn Saart	TKO	7 (10), 1:32	18 May 2024	Korakuen Hall, Tokyo, Japan	
9	Win	9–0	Jess Rhey Waminal	KO	1 (8), 0:53	20 Jan 2024	Korakuen Hall, Tokyo, Japan	
8	Win	8–0	Arnel Baconaje	KO	6 (8), 1:29	5 Aug 2023	Korakuen Hall, Tokyo, Japan	
7	Win	7–0	Lorenz Ladrada	KO	1 (8), 2:08	1 Oct 2022	Korakuen Hall, Tokyo, Japan	
6	Win	6–0	Juanito Paredes	KO	3 (8), 1:36	13 Jun 2022	Korakuen Hall, Tokyo, Japan	
5	Win	5–0	Ruito Saeki	UD	8	5 Dec 2020	Korakuen Hall, Tokyo, Japan	
4	Win	4–0	KJ Natuplag	TKO	3 (8), 0:18	2 Nov 2019	Korakuen Hall, Tokyo, Japan	
3	Win	3–0	Arvin Yurong	KO	2 (6), 1:35	6 Jul 2019	Korakuen Hall, Tokyo, Japan	
2	Win	2–0	Ekkalak Ratprakhon	KO	1 (6), 1:39	2 Feb 2019	Korakuen Hall, Tokyo, Japan	
1	Win	1–0	Thanawat Yanchareon	KO	2 (6), 1:49	Oct 6 2018	Korakuen Hall, Tokyo, Japan	
