= Joshua Greer Jr. =

American boxer

Personal information
- Nickname: Don't Blink
- Born: June 13, 1994 (age 32) Chicago, Illinois, U.S.
- Height: 5 ft 4 in (163 cm)
- Weight: Bantamweight; Super bantamweight

Boxing career
- Reach: 66 in (168 cm)
- Stance: Orthodox

Boxing record
- Total fights: 27
- Wins: 22
- Win by KO: 12
- Losses: 3
- Draws: 2

Joshua Kyle Greer Jr. (born June 13, 1994) is an American professional boxer and trainer who held the WBO-NABO bantamweight title in 2019.

== Professional career ==
Greer made his professional debut on September 26, 2015, scoring a second-round technical knockout (TKO) victory over Luis Guerrero at the Celebrity Theater in Phoenix, Arizona.

Greer defeated Nikolai Potapov for the WBO-NABO bantamweight title. He defended his title against former world title challenger Antonio Nieves.

In 2017, his knockout of James Gordon-Smith was a finalist for espn.com knockout of the year.

== Professional boxing record ==
27 fights	22 wins	3 losses
By knockout	12	0
By decision	10	3
Draws	2	

No.	Result	Record	Opponent	Type	Round, Time	Date	Location	Notes
27	Loss	22–3–2	Jason Moloney	UD	10	Aug 14, 2021	Hard Rock Hotel and Casino Tulsa, Tulsa, Oklahoma, U.S.	For vacant WBC Silver bantamweight title
26	Draw	22–2–2	Edwin Rodriguez	MD	8	Nov 14, 2020	The Bubble, MGM Grand Garden Arena, Paradise, Nevada, U.S.	
25	Loss	22–2–1	Mike Plania	MD	10	Jun 16, 2020	The Bubble, MGM Grand Garden Arena, Paradise, Nevada, U.S.	
24	Win	22–1–1	Antonio Nieves	UD	10	Oct 26, 2019	Reno-Sparks Convention Center, Reno, Nevada, U.S.	Retained WBC Continental Americas and NABO bantamweight titles
23	Win	21–1–1	Nikolai Potapov	MD	12	Jul 13, 2019	Prudential Center, Newark, New Jersey, U.S.	Won vacant NABO bantamweight title
22	Win	20–1–1	Giovanni Escaner	KO	8 (10), 2:33	Feb 15, 2019	Grand Casino Hinckley, Hinckley, Minnesota, U.S.	Retained WBC Continental Americas bantamweight title
21	Win	19–1–1	Daniel Lozano	RTD	7 (10), 3:00	Dec 14, 2018	American Bank Center, Corpus Christi, Texas, U.S.	Won vacant WBC Continental Americas bantamweight title
20	Win	18–1–1	Giovanni Delgado Morales	TKO	3 (8), 1:49	Sep 28, 2018	Oakland Arena, Oakland, California, U.S.	
19	Win	17–1–1	Glenn Dezurn	TKO	8 (10), 1:47	May 11, 2018	2300 Arena, Philadelphia, Pennsylvania, U.S.	
18	Win	16–1–1	Basilio Nieves	KO	3 (8), 1:11	Feb 24, 2018	Celebrity Theatre, Phoenix, Arizona, U.S.	
17	Win	15–1–1	Yaqub Kareem	RTD	4 (6), 3:00	Nov 17, 2017	WinnaVegas Casino & Resort, Sloan, Iowa, U.S.	
16	Win	14–1–1	Leroy Davila	RTD	5 (8), 3:00	Jul 14, 2017	Buffalo Run Casino, Miami, Florida, U.S.	
15	Win	13–1–1	Pablo Cupul	UD	6	Apr 8, 2017	McBride Hall, Gary, Indiana, U.S.	
14	Win	12–1–1	James Gordon-Smith	KO	6 (8), 2:06	Mar 10, 2017	MGM Grand Detroit, Detroit, Michigan, U.S.	
13	Win	11–1–1	Christian Renteria	KO	5 (6), 1:06	Oct 29, 2016	Tolleson Veterans Park, Tolleson, Arizona, U.S.	
12	Win	10–1–1	John Gabriel Medina	UD	6	Oct 1, 2016	UIC Pavilion, Chicago, Illinois, U.S.	
11	Win	9–1–1	Antwan Robertson	KO	1 (6), 0:24	Aug 6, 2016	National Guard Armory, Hammond, Indiana, U.S.	
10	Win	8–1–1	Raymond Chacon	UD	6	May 20, 2016	Celebrity Theatre, Phoenix, Arizona, U.S.	
9	Win	7–1–1	Xavier Montelongo Jr.	UD	6	Mar 26, 2016	Westin Bonaventure Hotel, Los Angeles, California, U.S.	
8	Win	6–1–1	Jesus Xavier PerArdua	MD	6	Mar 12, 2016	Valentino's Event Center, Phoenix, Arizona	
7	Win	5–1–1	Gabriel Braxton	UD	6	Feb 20, 2016	Camel Rock Casino, Camel Rock, New Mexico, U.S.	
6	Win	4–1–1	Jose Gallegos	UD	6	Feb 5, 2016	Jonathan Club, Los Angeles, California, U.S.	
5	Loss	3–1–1	Stephen Fulton	MD	4	Dec 29, 2015	Wind Creek Bethlehem, Bethlehem, Pennsylvania, U.S.	
4	Draw	3–0–1	Mario Ayala	MD	6	Nov 7, 2015	Arizona Event Center, Mesa, Arizona, U.S.	
3	Win	3–0	Christian Alejandro Silva	UD	6	Oct 24, 2015	Marriott Convention Center, Burbank, California, U.S.	
2	Win	2–0	Nicholas Brand	KO	1 (4), 1:35	Oct 9, 2015	Riverside Ballroom, Green Bay, Wisconsin, U.S.	
1	Win	1–0	Luis Guerrero	TKO	2 (4), 2:38	Sep 26, 2015	Celebrity Theatre, Phoenix, Arizona, U.S.	
