= Boxing at the 2018 Summer Youth Olympics – Boys' bantamweight =

Boxing competitions

Boys' bantamweight boxing at the III Summer Youth Olympic Games
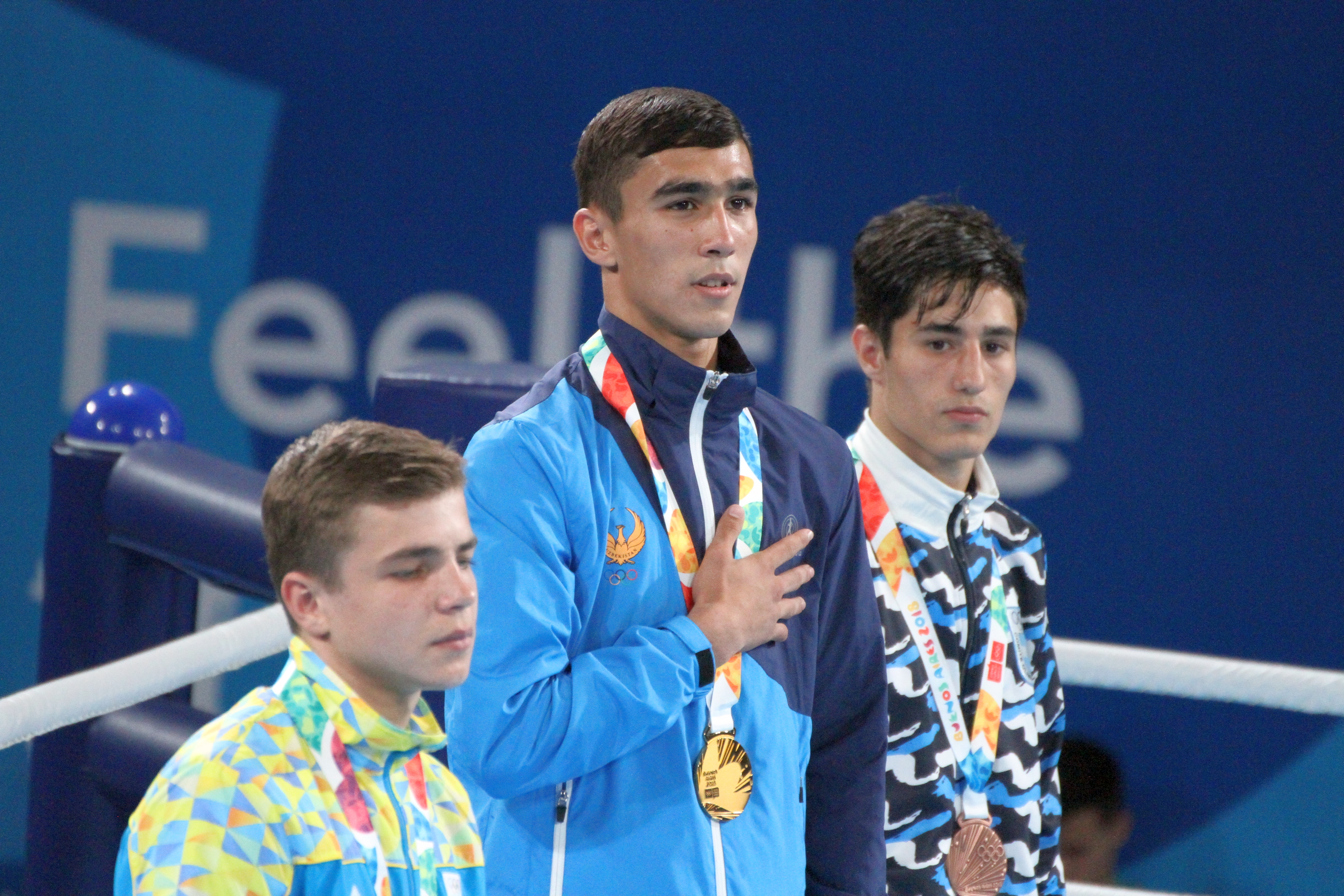
- 2018 Summer Youth Olympics – Boys' bantamweight Victory Ceremony
- Venue: Oceania Pavilion
- Date: 14–18 October
- Competitors: 6 from 6 nations

Medalists
1st place, gold medalist(s)		Abdumalik Khalokov	Uzbekistan
2nd place, silver medalist(s)		Maksym Halinichev	Ukraine
3rd place, bronze medalist(s)		Mirco Cuello	Argentina

The boys' bantamweight boxing competition at the 2018 Summer Youth Olympics in Buenos Aires was held from 14 to 18 October at the Oceania Pavilion.

== Schedule ==
All times are local (UTC−3).

Date	Time	Round
Sunday, 14 October	18:01	Preliminary Round 1
Monday, 15 October	17:58	Preliminary Round 2
Tuesday, 16 October	17:59	Semifinals
Thursday, 18 October	13:15	Finals

== Results ==
Preliminary Round 1
Mirco Cuello (ARG)	3
Muhamet Qamili (ALB)	2
Maksym Halinichev (UKR)	5
Christon Amram (NRU)	0

Preliminary Round 2
Abdumalik Khalokov (UZB)	5
Muhamet Qamili (ALB)	0
Christon Amram (NRU)	0
Abdessamad Abbaz (MAR)	5

Semifinals
Mirco Cuello (ARG)	0
Abdumalik Khalokov (UZB)	5
Abdessamad Abbaz (MAR)	0
Maksym Halinichev (UKR)	5
Fifth place
Muhamet Qamili (ALB)	WO
Christon Amram (NRU)

Final
Abdumalik Khalokov (UZB)	5
Maksym Halinichev (UKR)	0
Third place
Mirco Cuello (ARG)	5
Abdessamad Abbaz (MAR)	0

== Final standings ==
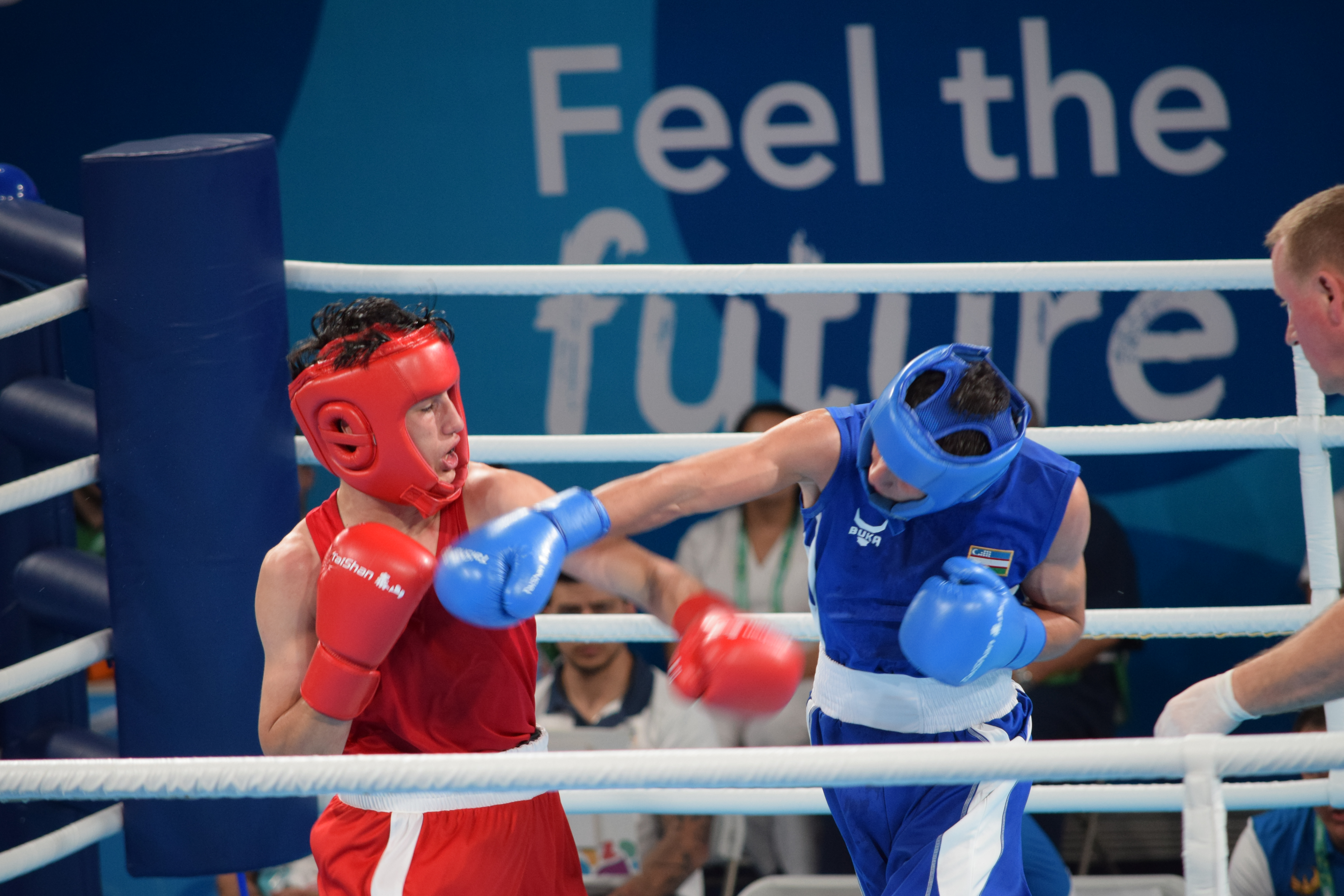
Semifinal Khalokov vs Cuello

Rank	Athlete
1st place, gold medalist(s)	Abdumalik Khalokov (UZB)
2nd place, silver medalist(s)	Maksym Halinichev (UKR)
3rd place, bronze medalist(s)	Mirco Cuello (ARG)
4	Abdessamad Abbaz (MAR)
5	Muhamet Qamili (ALB)
6	Christon Amram (NRU)
