= Yenifel Vicente =

Dominican boxer

Yenifel Vicente (born 26 June 1986) is a Dominican professional boxer. He held the WBA Fedelatin super-bantamweight title from 2010 to 2011 and the WBC FECARBOX super-bantamweight title in 2011. He has also been featured in the top 10 of the WBA rankings.

== Career ==
On 29 November 2010 he defeated Jonathan Perez for the WBA Fedelatin super bantamweight title.

On 27 July 2019 he challenged Tramaine Williams for the United States Boxing Association and North American Boxing Organization super bantamweight titles, losing by unanimous decision.

== Professional boxing record ==
46 fights	38 wins	5 losses
By knockout	29	0
By decision	9	4
By disqualification	0	1
Draws	2	
No contests	1	

No.	Result	Record	Opponent	Type	Round, Time	Date	Location	Notes
46	Win	38-5-2 (1)	(Dominican Republic) Anyelo Munoz	UD	6	8 April 2022	(Dominican Republic) Pabellon de Esgrima, Centro Olimpico, Santo Domingo	
45	Win	37-5-2 (1)	(Mexico) Edgar Martinez Barron	TKO	5 (8) 0:48	30 October 2021	(Mexico) Gimnasio Juan Francisco Estrada, Hermosillo	
44	Loss	36-5-2 (1)	(United States) Jessie Magdaleno	DQ	10 (10) 1:38	11 June 2020	(United States) The Bubble, MGM Grand, Las Vegas	
43	Win	36-4-2 (1)	(Mexico) Rodolfo Hernández Montoya	KO	4 (10) 2:50	26 October 2019	(Puerto Rico) Cancha Ruben Zayas Montanez, Trjillo Alto	Won vacant WBO Latino super bantamweight title
42	Loss	35-4-2 (1)	(United States) Tramaine Williams	UD	10	27 July 2019	(United States) College Park Center, Arlington	For vacant IBF USBA and WBO NABO super bantamweight titles
41	Win	35-3-2 (1)	(Colombia) Alberto Gonzalez	TKO	3 (10) 2:26	27 April 2019	(Colombia) Coliseo Cubierto, Galapa	
40	Win	34-3-2 (1)	(Mexico) Victor Proa	TKO	1 (10) 1:22	31 October 2018	Centro de Convenviones Vasco Núñez de Balboa (Hotel El Panama), Panama City	Won vacant WBO Latino super bantamweight title
39	Win	33-3-2 (1)	(Mexico) Andres Garcia Guzman	KO	2 (10) 2:36	17 August 2018	Lod Andes Mall, Panama City	
38	Win	32-3-2 (1)	(Colombia) Walberto Ramos	TKO	4 (10) 0:31	27 April 2018	(Colombia) Hotel el Prado, Barranquilla	
37	Win	31-3-2 (1)	(Dominican Republic) Esteban Aquino	RTD	1 (10) 3:00	22 December 2017	(Dominican Republic) Los Prados Social Club, Santo Domingo	Won vacant UBF World super bantamweight title
36	Win	30-3-2 (1)	(Dominican Republic) Alan Guzman	TKO	1 (10) 1:50	16 December 2016	(Dominican Republic) Maunoloa Night Club y Casino, Santo Domingo	
35	Win	29-3-2 (1)	(Dominican Republic) Luis Charlas	TKO	2 (10) 2:05	23 September 2016	(Dominican Republic) Salon de Eventos P.C. Sambil, Santo Domingo	
34	Win	28-3-2 (1)	(Dominican Republic) Juan Domínguez	KO	3 (10) 0:20	8 December 2015	(United States) Sun National Bank Center, Trenton	
33	Win	27-3-2 (1)	(Colombia) Manuel de los Reyes Herrera	TKO	3 (8) 1:01	24 July 2015	(United States) Brooklyn Masonic Temple, Brooklyn	
32	Win	26-3-2 (1)	(Colombia) Reynaldo Villamizar	KO	6 (6) 0:51	7 September 2014	(Colombia) Patio Cesa Los Caracoles, Santiago de Tolu	
31	Loss	25-3-2 (1)	(United States) Eric Hunter	UD	10	21 March 2015	(United States) Harrah's Philadelphia, Chester	For vacant IBF USBA featherweight title
30	Loss	25-2-2 (1)	(Mexico) Juan Antonío Rodriguez	MD	8	10 June 2014	(United States) Emerald Queen Casino, Tacoma	
29	Win	25-1-2 (1)	(United States) Jorge Diaz	TKO	4 (8) 2:02	14 June 2013	(United States) South Mountain Arena, South Orange	
28	Win	24-1-2 (1)	(Dominican Republic) Aneurys Mesa Rodriguez	RTD	1 (8) 3:00	5 April 2013	(Dominican Republic) UTESA, Santiago de los Caballeros	
27	Loss	23-1-2 (1)	(United States) Chris Avalos	UD	10	10 August 2012	(United States) Morongo Casino, Resort & Spa, Cabazon	
26	Win	23-0-2 (1)	(Costa Rica) Carlos Rivas	TKO	3 (6) 0:55	26 May 2012	(Nicaragua) Polideportivo España, Managua	
25	Win	22-0-2 (1)	(Dominican Republic) Manuel Gonzalez Garcia	UD	8	6 November 2011	(Dominican Republic) Hard Rock Hotel & Casino, Punta Cana	
24	NC	21-0-2 (1)	(Colombia) Luis Zambrano	NC	2 (10) 1:23	30 May 2011	(Dominican Republic) Coliseo Carlos 'Teo' Cruz, Santo Domingo	
23	Win	21-0-2	(Dominican Republic) Franklin Frias	TKO	5 (10)	19 March 2011	(Dominican Republic) Coliseo Carlos 'Teo' Cruz, Santo Domingo	Won vacant WBC FECARBOX super bantamweight title
22	Win	20-0-2	(Colombia) Jonathan Perez	KO	2 (9) 2:15	29 November 2010	(Dominican Republic) Coliseo Pepe Mayen, San Pedro de Macoris	Won vacant WBA Fedelatin super bantamweight title
21	Win	19-0-2	(Dominican Republic) Héctor Julio Ávila	KO	2 (10) 0:43	18 September 2010	(Dominican Republic) Coliseo Carlos 'Teo' Cruz, Santo Domingo	
20	Win	18-0-2	(Dominican Republic) Luis Rosario	TKO	2 (8) 3:00	2 May 2010	(Dominican Republic) Club Luperon, Santo Domingo	
19	Win	17-0-2	(Dominican Republic) Junior Rodriguez	TKO	1 (10) 1:21	21 December 2009	(Dominican Republic) Coliseo Carlos 'Teo' Cruz, Santo Domingo	
18	Win	16-0-2	(Dominican Republic) Francisco Lorenzo	SD	10	16 November 2009	(Dominican Republic) Coliseo Carlos 'Teo' Cruz, Santo Domingo	
17	Win	15-0-2	(Dominican Republic) Andres Capellan	TKO	1 (10)	19 October 2009	(Dominican Republic) Coliseo Carlos 'Teo' Cruz, Santo Domingo	
16	Win	14-0-2	(Dominican Republic) Alejandro Lebron	UD	8	24 July 2008	(Dominican Republic) Club Pepe Lucas, Santo Domingo	
15	Win	13-0-2	(Dominican Republic) Juan Carlos Rosario	KO	2 (12)	29 June 2009	(Dominican Republic) Coliseo Carlos 'Teo' Cruz, Santo Domingo	Won vacant Dominican Republic super bantamweight title
14	Win	12-0-2	(Dominican Republic) Carlos Fulgencio	TKO	3 (6)	30 March 2009	(Dominican Republic) Coliseo Carlos 'Teo' Cruz, Santo Domingo	
13	Win	11-0-2	(Dominican Republic) Christian Martinez	KO	1 (6)	28 February 2009	(Dominican Republic) Club Luperon, Santo Domingo	
12	Win	10-0-2	(Dominican Republic) Leonardo Espinal	TKO	1 (8)	29 November 2008	(Dominican Republic) Club Luperon, Santiago de los Caballeros	
11	Win	9-0-2	(Dominican Republic) Santiago Matos	TKO	2 (?)	18 October 2008	(Dominican Republic) Club Maquiteria, Santo Domingo	
10	Win	8-0-2	(Venezuela) Liborio Solís	UD	6	23 August 2008	(Aruba) Centro Bético Croes, Santa Cruz	
9	Win	7-0-2	(Dominican Republic) Oscar Rodriguez	KO	2 (6)	11 May 2008	(Dominican Republic) Coliseo Carlos 'Teo' Cruz, Santo Domingo	
8	Win	6-0-2	(Dominican Republic) Jin Kelly	TKO	2 (6)	15 March 2008	(Dominican Republic) Club Paraíso, Santo Domingo	
7	Win	5-0-2	(Dominican Republic) Alejandro Lebron	UD	6	12 November 2007	(Dominican Republic) Coliseo Carlos 'Teo' Cruz, Santo Domingo	
6	Win	4-0-2	(Dominican Republic) Ambioris Figueroa	UD	6	8 September 2007	(Dominican Republic) Club Luperon, Santo Domingo	
5	Win	3-0-2	(Dominican Republic) Santiago Matos	UD	6	1 June 2007	(Dominican Republic) Coliseo Carlos 'Teo' Cruz, Santo Domingo	
4	Win	2-0-2	(Dominican Republic) Mario Rosario	KO	4 (6)	16 April 2007	(Dominican Republic) Coliseo Carlos 'Teo' Cruz, Santo Domingo	
3	Draw	1-0-2	(Dominican Republic) Ambioris Figueroa	PTS	6	18 February 2007	(Dominican Republic) San Pedro	
2	Draw	1-0-1	(Dominican Republic) Julio Lopez	PTS	4	27 October 2006	(Dominican Republic) Club Luperon, Santo Domingo	
1	Win	1-0	(Dominican Republic) Mario Rosario	SD	4	27 August 2006	(Dominican Republic) Club Calero, Villa Duarte	Professional Debut
