= Erik Ruiz =

American boxer

Personal information
- Nickname: El Trompo
- Born: March 10, 1992 (age 34) Oxnard, California, U.S.
- Height: 5 ft 7 in (170 cm)
- Weight: Super Bantamweight

Boxing career
- Reach: 70 in (178 cm)
- Stance: Orthodox

Boxing record
- Total fights: 29
- Wins: 17
- Win by KO: 7
- Losses: 11
- Draws: 1

Erik Ruiz (born March 10, 1992) is an American professional boxer trained by former world champion Robert Garcia.

== Personal life ==
Erik Ruiz is the uncle of undefeated prospect Andrew Ruiz.

== Professional career ==
On June 3, 2011, Ruiz beat Shaun Solomon by TKO to win his professional debut.

On April 4, 2024, Ruiz was scheduled to face Jose Tito Sanchez in Indio, California.

== Professional boxing record ==
29 fights	17 wins	11 losses
By knockout	7	0
By decision	10	11
Draws	1	

No.	Result	Record	Opponent	Type	Round, time	Date	Location	Notes
29	Loss	17–11–1	Jose Tito Sanchez	UD	10	Apr 4, 2024	Fantasy Springs Resort Casino, Indio, California, U.S.	
28	Loss	17–10–1	David Picasso	UD	10	Jan 27, 2024	Footprint Center, Phoenix, Arizona, U.S.	
27	Loss	17–9–1	Lawrence Newton	UD	6	Dec 2, 2023	Casino Miami Jai-Alai, Miami, Florida, U.S.	
26	Loss	17–8–1	Angelo Leo	UD	8	Dec 7, 2018	Sam's Town Hotel and Gambling Hall, Sunrise Manor, Nevada, U.S.	
25	Win	17–7–1	Mario Díaz Maldonado	TKO	8 (8), 2:38	Jun 9, 2018	Kings Theatre, Brooklyn, New York City, New York U.S.	
24	Loss	16–7–1	Diego De La Hoya	UD	10	May 18, 2017	Casino Del Sol, Tucson, Arizona, U.S.	
23	Loss	16–6–1	Rico Ramos	UD	10	Mar 11, 2017	Downtown Las Vegas Events Center, Downtown Las Vegas, Nevada, U.S.	
22	Win	16–5–1	Hanzel Martínez	MD	10	Sep 30, 2016	Downtown Las Vegas Events Center, Downtown Las Vegas, Nevada, U.S.	
21	Draw	15–5–1	Horacio García	SD	10	May 6, 2016	Toshiba Plaza, Paradise, Nevada, U.S.	For vacant NABF super bantamweight title
20	Loss	15–5	Alexis Santiago	UD	10	Feb 16, 2016	Sam's Town Hotel and Gambling Hall, Sunrise Manor, Nevada, U.S.	
19	Win	15–4	Roy Tapia	SD	8	Nov 20, 2015	Hard Rock Hotel and Casino, The Joint, Paradise, Nevada, U.S.	
18	Loss	14–4	Daniel Roman	UD	10	Sep 25, 2015	DoubleTree Hotel, Ontario, California, U.S.	For NABF super bantamweight title
17	Win	14–3	Fernando Fuentes	SD	6	Aug 21, 2015	Omega Products International, Corona, California, U.S.	
16	Loss	13–3	Manuel Ávila	UD	10	May 7, 2015	Belasco Theater, Los Angeles, California, U.S.	
15	Loss	13–2	Jessie Magdaleno	UD	8	Jan 10, 2015	Texas Station Casino, North Las Vegas, Nevada, U.S.	For vacant NABF Junior super bantamweight title
14	Win	13–1	Jonathan Alcantara	UD	6	Jul 19, 2014	Pioneer Event Center, Lancaster, California, U.S.	
13	Win	12–1	Brandon Gushiken	TKO	2 (6), 2:40	Apr 26, 2014	Oceanview Pavilion, Port Hueneme, California, U.S.	
12	Win	11–1	Victor Raul Capaceta	UD	4	Feb 6, 2014	Florentine Gardens, Hollywood, Los Angeles, California	
11	Win	10–1	Rigoberto Casillas	KO	1 (6), 1:36	Nov 14, 2013	Florentine Gardens, Hollywood, Los Angeles, California, U.S.	
10	Loss	9–1	Isaac Zarate	MD	6	Aug 24, 2013	Civic Auditorium, Glendale, California, U.S.	
9	Win	9–0	Pablo Cupul	RTD	4 (6), 3:00	Jul 13, 2013	Hollywood Park Casino, Inglewood, California, U.S.	
8	Win	8–0	Oscar Venegas	SD	6	Mar 14, 2013	Florentine Gardens, Hollywood, Los Angeles, California, U.S.	
7	Win	7–0	DeWayne Wisdom	UD	4	Dec 21, 2012	Florentine Gardens, Hollywood, Los Angeles, California, U.S.	
6	Win	6–0	Daniel Modad	TKO	1 (4)	Sep 20, 2012	Florentine Gardens, Hollywood, Los Angeles, California, U.S.	
5	Win	5–0	Raymond Chacon	MD	4	Jul 12, 2012	Florentine Gardens, Hollywood, Los Angeles, California, U.S.	
4	Win	4–0	Jesse Adame	UD	4	Jan 21, 2012	Warner Center Marriott, Woodland Hills, Los Angeles, California, U.S.	
3	Win	3–0	Emanuel Machorro	TKO	2 (4), 2:51	Nov 26, 2011	Westin Bonaventure Hotel, Los Angeles, California, U.S.	
2	Win	2–0	Troy Wohosky	UD	4	Sep 9, 2011	Warner Center Marriott, Woodland Hills, Los Angeles, California, U.S.	
1	Win	1–0	Shaun Solomon	TKO	4 (4), 1:52	Jun 3, 20211	Warner Center Marriott, Woodland Hills, Los Angeles, California, U.S.	

== See also ==
- Notable boxing families
