= Elijah Pierce (boxer) =

American boxer (born 1996)

Personal information
- Nicknames: The WXXXLF; The Wolf
- Nationality: American
- Born: Elijah Pierce; September 30, 1996 (age 29) Midwest City, Oklahoma, U.S.
- Height: 1.73
- Weight: Super bantamweight; Featherweight; Super featherweight; Lightweight

Boxing career
- Stance: Southpaw

Boxing record
- Total fights: 24
- Wins: 21
- Win by KO: 17
- Losses: 3

Elijah Pierce (born September 30, 1996) is an American professional boxer who held the WBO International featherweight title from July 2025 until February 2026.

== Amateur career ==
Pierce, born in Midwest City, Oklahoma, fought in regional championships at the United States as an amateur, he gained victories against a handful of boxers such as former World Boxing Association (WBA) super lightweight champion Rolando Romero, he also has plenty of losses, with the likes of Hector Tanajara Jr. He also fondly recalls a rivalry with top prospect Bruce Carrington in an interview.

== Professional career ==
=== Early years ===
On July 23, 2016, Pierce began his professional career as a lightweight and made his debut match against Deartie Tucker in Remington Park, Oklahoma City. In the fight, Tucker weighed 139 pounds (63.05 kilograms), whilst Pierce weighed 5 pounds (2.27 kilograms) lighter, Pierce won via 1st round TKO, finishing the bout within 2 minutes and 49 seconds.

Pierce moved down to the super featherweight division in his third bout against debutant Xavier Siller, Pierce won via third round TKO. Pierce returned to the lightweight division against journeyman Anthony Dave, who he would defeat via second-round KO. In his next bout, Pierce moved back down to the super featherweight division to defeat undefeated Mexican Calendario Alejandro Rochin.

==== Pierce vs. Cabrera ====
After amassing a record of 8–0, 7 KOs, Pierce moved to the featherweight division. On June 9, 2018, Pierce gambled his undefeated status against fellow undefeated compatriot Giovanni Cabrera at the Emerald Queen Casino located in Tacoma, Washington, Pierce concedes his first loss as Cabrera scores a 10-round unanimous decision victory.

==== Pierce vs. Gonzalez ====
11 months later, on May 17, 2019, Pierce was scheduled against 12–0, 9 KOs prospect Irvin Gonzalez. Prior to the fight, Pierce was a +1000 underdog, but Pierce proved the odds-maker wrong as he scored a huge upset, dropping Gonzalez two times in the opening round before finishing Gonzalez in the third round.

==== Pierce vs. Segawa ====
On September 28, 2019, Pierce was matched against Ugandan prospect Sulaiman Segawa, Pierce lost for the second time with a close majority decision, whilst Segawa improved to 13 wins with 2 defeats.

After improving to 12–2, 11 KOs, Pierce fought undefeated Jesse Garcia on June 4, 2022 in Houston, Texas. Pierce won the fight by third round TKO. Supposedly, Pierce was to fight Filipino regional challenger Joseph Ambo, however, the bout wasn't continued, Pierce instead fought American Ryizeemmion Ford, Pierce won via majority decision.

On October 15, 2022 in Live! Casino & Hotel, Hanover, Maryland, Pierce won the vacant WBC Silver super bantamweight title in Pierce's debut in the super bantamweight division with a second-round knockout against Washington D.C.-based Daron Williams. On November 19, 2022, Pierce defeated veteran Juan Carlos Peña via 2nd round TKO in Oklahoma City.

=== Rise up the ranks ===
==== Pierce vs. Williams ====
On April 22, 2023, Pierce was scheduled with former WBO World title-challenger Tramaine Williams for the vacant WBC Silver super bantamweight strap in a 10-rounder bout in Mohegan Sun Arena, Uncasville, Connecticut, Pierce upsets Williams scoring a unanimous decision victory with 2 judges scoring 97–93 and 1 judge scoring 96–94.

==== Pierce vs. Plania ====
On August 4, 2023, Pierce dueled Filipino challenger and former IBF North American champion Mike Plania to headline Overtime Elite-based Overtime Boxing (OTX) Summer Boxing Series in Overtime Elite Arena, Atlanta, Georgia. After Plania being in much control of the fight, Pierce bounced back with a one-punch KO in the third round that concluded the fight.

==== Pierce vs. Villanueva ====
On March 29, 2024, Pierce fought ex-ALA Promotions stalwart ring veteran Arthur Villanueva in Overtime Elite Arena, Atlanta, Georgia, Pierce survived a second-round knockdown, but Pierce was able to stand up and avenged the ensuing round, eventually, Pierce stopped Villanueva in the fourth round.

==== Pierce vs. Sanmartin ====
On August 30, 2024, Pierce was scheduled against Colombian veteran Jose Sanmartin for the vacant WBA Continental Americas super bantamweight title, Pierce won via unanimous decision.

==== Pierce vs. Dasmariñas ====
Pierce won the vacant WBO International featherweight title with a ninth round knockout success over Michael Dasmariñas at The Tabernacle in Atlanta, Georgia, USA, on July 25, 2025.

==== Pierce vs. Parra ====
Pierce made the first defense of the title against Lorenzo Parra at Turning Stone Resort and Casinomin Verona, New York, USA, on February 28, 2026, losing by technical knockout in the second round.

== Professional boxing record ==
24 fights	21 wins	3 losses
By knockout	17	1
By decision	4	2

No.	Result	Record	Opponent	Type	Round, time	Date	Location	Notes
24	Loss	21–3	Lorenzo Parra	TKO	2 (10), 1:44	Feb 28, 2026	Turning Stone Resort and Casino, Verona, New York, U.S.	Lost WBO International featherweight title
23	Win	21–2	Michael Dasmariñas	KO	9 (10), 2:01	Jul 25, 2025	The Tabernacle, Atlanta, Georgia, U.S.	Won vacant WBO International featherweight title
22	Win	20–2	José Sanmartín	UD	10	Aug 30, 2024	Overtime Elite Arena, Atlanta, Georgia, U.S.	Won vacant WBA Continental Americas super bantamweight title
21	Win	19–2	Arthur Villanueva	TKO	4 (8), 2:57	Mar 29, 2024	Overtime Elite Arena, Atlanta, Georgia, U.S.	
20	Win	18–2	Mike Plania	KO	3 (8), 0:22	Aug 4, 2023	Overtime Elite Arena, Atlanta, Georgia, U.S.	
19	Win	17–2	Tramaine Williams	UD	10	Apr 22, 2023	Mohegan Sun Casino, Uncasville, Connecticut, U.S.	Won vacant WBC Silver super bantamweight title
18	Win	16–2	Juan Carlos Peña	TKO	2 (6), 2:17	Nov 19, 2022	Farmer's Market, Oklahoma City, Oklahoma, U.S.	
17	Win	15–2	Daron Williams	KO	2 (8), 1:43	Oct 15, 2022	Live! Casino & Hotel, Hanover, Maryland, U.S.	Won vacant WBC Silver super bantamweight title
16	Win	14–2	Ryizeemmion Ford	MD	6	Jun 17, 2022	Euclid Auditorium, Cleveland, Ohio, U.S.	
15	Win	13–2	Jesse Garcia	TKO	3 (8), 1:08	Jun 4, 2022	GSH Events Center, Houston, Texas, U.S.	
14	Win	12–2	Luis Valdés Peña	KO	1 (6), 0:39	Mar 12, 2022	Buffalo Run Casino, Miami, Oklahoma, U.S.	
13	Win	11–2	Mike Fowler	TKO	2 (6), 1:19	Aug 14, 2021	World Congress Center, Atlanta, Georgia, U.S.	
12	Win	10–2	Anthony Zender	TKO	2 (6), 2:50	Mar 27, 2021	Cosmopolitan Lounge, Decatur, Georgia, U.S.	
11	Loss	9–2	Sulaiman Segawa	MD	8	Sep 28, 2019	Buckhead Theatre, Atlanta, Georgia, U.S.	Lost WBC Silver featherweight title
10	Win	9–1	Irvin Gonzalez	TKO	3 (8), 2:12	May 17, 2019	Foxwoods Resort Casino, Mashantucket, Connecticut, U.S.	Won vacant WBC Silver featherweight title
9	Loss	8–1	Giovanni Cabrera	UD	10	Jun 9, 2018	Emerald Queen Casino, Tacoma, Washington, U.S.	
8	Win	8–0	Anthony Napunyi	KO	4 (6), 1:10	Nov 4, 2017	Buckhead Fight Club, Atlanta, Georgia, U.S.	
7	Win	7–0	Divante Jones	RTD	3 (6), 3:00	Sep 2, 2017	Laney High School, Augusta, Georgia, U.S.	
6	Win	6–0	Calendario Alejandro Rochin	UD	6	May 6, 2017	Capitol Hill High School, Oklahoma City, Oklahoma, U.S.	
5	Win	5–0	Anthony Dave	KO	2 (4), 2:57	Apr 1, 2017	Tara Center, Jonesboro, Georgia, U.S.	
4	Win	4–0	Demetrius Wilson	KO	4 (4), 1:41	Feb 4, 2017	Remington Park, Oklahoma City, Oklahoma, U.S.	
3	Win	3–0	Xavier Siller	TKO	3 (4), 2:00	Jan 19, 2017	Criterion Event Center, Oklahoma, Oklahoma, U.S.	
2	Win	2–0	Antonio Cruz	TKO	4 (4), 2:40	Oct 1, 2016	Firelake Arena, Shawnee, Oklahoma, U.S.	
1	Win	1–0	Deartie Tucker	TKO	1 (4), 2:49	Jul 23, 2016	Remington Park, Oklahoma City, Oklahoma, U.S.	
