= Nikolai Potapov =

Russian boxer

Personal information
- Nationality: Russian
- Born: Николай Сергеевич Потапов; 12 January 1990 (age 36) Podolsk, Russia
- Height: 1.65 m (5 ft 5 in)
- Weight: Bantamweight

Boxing career
- Reach: 170 cm (67 in)
- Stance: Orthodox

Boxing record
- Total fights: 27
- Wins: 23
- Win by KO: 11
- Losses: 3
- Draws: 1

Nikolai Potapov is a Russian boxer from Podolsk, Russia.

== Regional title fights ==
In 2016, Potapov fought to a draw against Stephon Young for the vacant North American Boxing Association bantamweight title.

On March 10, 2017, Potapov challenged for the North American Boxing Organization bantamweight title against Antonio Nieves on ShoBox. This was his second appearance on the series, where he won by split decision.

He later vacated the NABO title, but fought for the vacant title again, losing to Joshua Greer Jr.

== Professional boxing record ==
27 fights	23 wins	3 losses
By knockout	11	2
By decision	12	1
Draws	1	

No.	Result	Record	Opponent	Type	Round, time	Date	Location	Notes
27	Loss	23–3–1	Vincent Astrolabio	KO	6 (12), 1:26	17 Dec 2022	The Cosmopolitan of Las Vegas, Chelsea Ballroom, Las Vegas, U.S	For vacant WBO Inter-Continental bantamweight title
26	Win	23–2–1	Oscar Duge	UD	8	27 Jun 2021	USC Soviet Wings, Moscow, Russia	
25	Win	22–2–1	Oleksandr Hryshchuk	UD	8	24 Dec 2020	USC Soviet Wings, Moscow, Russia	
24	Win	21–2–1	Nasibu Ramadhani	DQ	5 (8), 0:15	30 Oct 2019	Korston Club, Moscow, Russia	
23	Loss	20–2–1	Joshua Greer Jr.	MD	12	13 Jul 2019	Prudential Center, Newark, U.S.	For vacant WBO-NABO bantamweight title
22	Win	20–1–1	Adam Mbega	RTD	3 (8), 3:00	30 Mar 2019	Ice Palace, Vladimir, Russia	
21	Win	19–1–1	Khumoyun Rustamov	KO	4 (10), 2:49	13 Oct 2018	Ekaterinburg Expo, Yekaterinburg, Russia	
20	Win	18–1–1	Aleksandr Saltykov	RTD	3 (10), 3:00	13 Oct 2018	Floyd Mayweather Boxing Academy, Zhukovka, Russia	
19	Loss	17–1–1	Omar Narváez	RTD	7 (12), 3:00	14 Oct 2017	Estadio Obras Sanitarias, Buenos Aires, Argentina	
18	Win	17–0–1	Antonio Nieves	SD	10	10 Mar 2017	MGM Grand Detroit, Detroit, U.S.	
17	Win	16–0–1	Aleksandr Saltykov	TKO	4 (10), 2:39	15 Dec 2016	Qin Shi Huang Restaurant, Saint Petersburg, Russia	
16	Win	15–0–1	Vladislav Sagalakov	TKO	3 (4), 2:59	7 Sep 2016	Boxing & Gym Academy, Moscow, Russia	
15	Draw	14–0–1	Stephon Young	MD	10	15 Apr 2016	Turning Stone Resort & Casino, Verona, U.S.	For vacant NABA bantamweight title
14	Win	14–0	Pedro Melo	UD	10	29 Oct 2015	Aviator Sports Complex, Brooklyn, U.S.	
13	Win	13–0	Jason Canoy	UD	12	8 Nov 2014	Yunost, Klimovsk, Russia	Won vacant WBA Asia bantamweight title
12	Win	12–0	Martin Casillas	UD	10	25 Apr 2014	Ivanhoe Country Club, Podolsk, Russia	
11	Win	11–0	Nasibu Ramadhani	UD	10	16 Nov 2013	Ivanhoe Country Club, Podolsk, Russia	
10	Win	10–0	Abigail Medina	UD	10	18 May 2013	Yunost, Klimovsk, Russia	
9	Win	9–0	Zhandos Zhetpisbayev	UD	10	27 Oct 2012	Ivanhoe Country Club, Podolsk, Russia	
8	Win	8–0	Roberto Santos de Jesus	KO	2 (6), 1:58	18 Sep 2012	Varshavka Sky, Moscow, Russia	
7	Win	7–0	Dmytro Aushev	UD	6	19 May 2012	Yunost, Klimovsk, Russia	
6	Win	6–0	Vladislav Sagalakov	TKO	1 (6), 2:28	24 Feb 2012	Podmoskovye Hall, Podolsk, Russia	
5	Win	5–0	Bayram Mukhamedov	UD	6	24 Dec 2011	Sport Service, Podolsk, Russia	
4	Win	4–0	Rauf Aghayev	TKO	1 (8), 2:43	16 Oct 2010	Olimpyskiy Sports Palace, Chekhov, Russia	
3	Win	3–0	Ravil Mukhamadiyarov	RTD	2 (4), 3:00	13 Jun 2010	Yunost, Klimovsk, Russia	
2	Win	2–0	Khasan Vishnyakov	TKO	2 (4), 0:25	23 May 2010	Red Square, Moscow, Russia	
1	Win	1–0	Vladislav Zubkov	KO	3 (4), 1:42	13 Mar 2010	Podmoskovye Hall, Podolsk, Russia	
