= Carlos Valcárcel =

Puerto Rican boxer

Personal information
- Full name: Carlos Valcárcel Díaz
- Born: October 25, 1981 (age 44) San Juan, Puerto Rico
Medal record
Men's Boxing
Representing Puerto Rico
Central American and Caribbean Games
Silver medal – second place	2002 San Salvador	Flyweight

Carlos Valcárcel Díaz (born October 25, 1981, in San Juan) is a boxer from Puerto Rico, who represented his native country at the 2000 Summer Olympics in Sydney, Australia. He won the silver medal in the men's flyweight division (– 51 kg) at the 2002 Central American and Caribbean Games in El Salvador. Valcarcel made his professional debut on 2004-05-25.

On June 8, 2012, Valcarcel fought Jesse Magdaleno on ESPN Friday Night Fights at Las Vegas, Nevada. He lost by a first-round knockout.

His professional boxing record stands at 12 wins, 5 losses and 4 draws (ties), 5 wins by knockout.

Varcarcel is a resident of the city of Catano.
