= Mike Plania =

Filipino boxer

Personal information
- Nickname: Magic
- Nationality: Filipino
- Born: February 6, 1997 (age 29) General Santos, Philippines
- Height: 5 ft 5.5 in (166 cm)
- Weight: Super bantamweight

Boxing career
- Reach: 65 1/2 in (166 cm)
- Stance: Orthodox

Boxing record
- Total fights: 36
- Wins: 31
- Win by KO: 18
- Losses: 5
Medal record
Men's amateur boxing
Representing Philippines
Philippine National Games
Gold medal – first place	2013 Manila	Bantamweight

Michael Angelou Villafuerte Plania (born 6 February 1997) is a Filipino professional boxer.

== Professional boxing career ==
Plania made his professional debut against Lordly Pateno on 22 August 2014, and won the fight by unanimous decision. He amassed a 15–0 record during the next four years, with seven of those victories coming by way of stoppage.

Plania was scheduled to face Juan Carlos Payano for the vacant WBO Inter-continental bantamweight title on 23 March 2018, at the Seminole Hard Rock Hotel and Casino in Miami, in his United States debut. He suffered his first professional loss, as Payano won the fight by unanimous decision, with scores of 96–93, 97-92 and 97–92. Plania faced the journeyman John Rey Lauza on 19 May 2018. He successfully bounced back from his first professional loss with a first-round knockout victory. Plania fought for a regional belt once again on 9 September 2018, as he was scheduled to face Angelito Merin for the vacant WBC-ABC Silver super bantamweight title. He won the fight by a fourth-round technical knockout. Plania faced Renan Portes on 25 November 2018, in his last fight of the year. He won the bout by a first-round knockout.

Plania was booked to face Juan Antonio Lopez on 13 January 2019. He won the fight by unanimous decision, with scores of 79–73, 78-74 and 77–75. Plania was next scheduled to face Nicardo Calamba on 30 April 2019. He won the fight by a second-round knockout. Plania made his third appearance of the year on 26 July 2019, against Matias Agustin Arriagada. He won the fight by unanimous decision, with all three judges awarding him a 60-52 scorecard. Plania was booked to fight Julio Buitrago on 25 October 2019. He won the fight by a fourth-round technical knockout. Plania made his fifth and final appearance of the year against Giovanni Gutierrez for the vacant IBF North American super bantamweight title on 21 December 2019. He won the fight by a dominant unanimous decision, with all three judges scoring the fight 100-89 for him.

Plania faced the #1 ranked WBO bantamweight contender Joshua Greer Jr. on 16 June 2020. Despite coming into the fight as an underdog, Plania won the fight by an upset majority decision, with scores of 96–92, 97-91 and 94-94. He twice knocked Greer down, in the first and sixth rounds.

Plania faced Emmanuel Mogawa on 30 April 2021, in his first fight in Philippines since 30 April 2019. He won the fight by unanimous decision, with all three judges scoring the fight 60-54 for him. Plania next faced Ricardo Nunez on 20 November 2021. He won the fight by a first-round technical knockout.

Plania was expected to face the former WBA interim super bantamweight titleholder Ra'eese Aleem on 18 June 2022. The fight was later postponed for 4 September 2022. Plania lost the fight by unanimous decision, with all three judges scoring the fight 100–89 for Aleem. Plania was given a standing count in the eight round, although replays showed the punch did not land flush on him.

Plania is scheduled to face Jeffrey Francisco on 31 December 2022, in what was his first fight in the Philippines since April 2021.

== Professional boxing record ==
36 fights	31 wins	5 losses
By knockout	18	2
By decision	13	3

No.	Result	Record	Opponent	Type	Round, time	Date	Location	Notes
36	Loss	31–5	Omar Trinidad	UD	10	26 Oct 2024	Commerce Casino, Commerce, California, U.S.	For WBC Continental Americas featherweight title
35	Win	31–4	Deivi Julio	KO	3 (8),	26 Oct 2024	Miccosukee Indian Gaming Resort, Miami, Florida, U.S.	
34	Win	30–4	Martin Diaz	KO	1 (10), 0:23	27 Apr 2024	Miccosukee Indian Gaming Resort, Miami, Florida, U.S.	
33	Loss	29–4	Angelo Leo	KO	3 (10), 1:11	31 Jan 2024	WhiteSands Events Center, Plant City, Florida, U.S.	For vacant WBA Continental Americas featherweight title
32	Win	29–3	Daniel Nicolas	KO	1 (6), 1:11	18 Dec 2023	The Flash Grand Ballroom of the Elorde Sports Complex, Parañaque, Philippines	
31	Loss	28–3	Elijah Pierce	KO	3 (8) 0:33	4 Aug 2023	Overtime Elite Arena, Atlanta, U.S.	
30	Win	28–2	Mark Anthony Geraldo	KO	1 (10) 1:55	17 May 2023	Sanman Gym, General Santos City, Philippines	
29	Win	27–2	Jeffrey Francisco	KO	1 (8) 0:38	31 Dec 2022	Davao del Norte Sports and Tourism Complex, Tagum City, Philippines	
28	Loss	26–2	Ra'eese Aleem	UD	10	4 Sep 2022	Crypto.com Arena, Los Angeles, U.S.	For WBO NABO super bantamweight title
27	Win	26–1	Ricardo Nunez	TKO	1 (8), 2:41	20 Nov 2021	Manual Artime Community Center Theater, Miami, U.S.	
26	Win	25–1	Emmanuel Mogawa	UD	6	30 Apr 2021	Sanman Gym, General Santos, Philippines	
25	Win	24–1	Joshua Greer Jr.	MD	10	16 Jun 2020	MGM Grand, Las Vegas, U.S.	
24	Win	23–1	Giovanni Gutierrez	UD	10	21 Dec 2019	Miami-Dade County Fair & Expo, Miami, U.S.	Won vacant IBF North American super bantamweight title
23	Win	22–1	Julio Buitrago	TKO	4 (8), 1:11	25 Oct 2019	Miami-Dade County Fair & Expo, Miami, U.S.	
22	Win	21–1	Matias Agustin Arriagada	UD	6	26 Jul 2019	Miccosukee Indian Gaming Resort, Miami, U.S.	
21	Win	20–1	Nicardo Calamba	KO	2 (6), 0:44	30 Apr 2019	Miccosukee Indian Gaming Resort, Miami, U.S.	
20	Win	19–1	Juan Antonio Lopez	UD	8	13 Jan 2019	Microsoft Theater, Los Angeles, U.S.	
19	Win	18–1	Renan Portes	KO	1 (10), 2:26	25 Nov 2018	Robinson’s Mall Atrium, General Santos, Philippines	
18	Win	17–1	Angelito Merin	TKO	4 (8), 1:32	9 Sep 2018	Polomolok, Philippines	Won vacant WBC-ABCO Silver super bantamweight title
17	Win	16–1	John Rey Lauza	KO	1 (8), 2:13	19 May 2018	Polomolok Gym, Polomolok, Philippines	
16	Loss	15–1	Juan Carlos Payano	UD	10	23 Mar 2018	Seminole Hard Rock Hotel and Casino, Hollywood, Philippines	For vacant WBO Inter-continental bantamweight title
15	Win	15–0	Roger Flores Alonzo	UD	6	22 Dec 2017	Domo Habitat 2, Chetumal, Mexico	
14	Win	14–0	Jetly Purisima	RTD	5 (8), 3:00	26 Feb 2017	Lagao Gym, General Santos, Philippines	
13	Win	13–0	JP Macadumpis	KO	2 (8), 0:23	4 Dec 2016	Robinson’s Mall Atrium, General Santos, Philippines	
12	Win	12–0	Jhon Rey de Asis	KO	2 (8), 0:39	10 Sep 2016	Tupi Municipal Gymnasium, Tupi, Philippines	
11	Win	11–0	Romulo Ramayan Jr	UD	8	26 Jun 2016	Gaisano Mall Atrium, General Santos, Philippines	
10	Win	10–0	Lorence Rosas	MD	10	30 Apr 2016	Makati Cinema Square Boxing Arena, Makati City, Philippines	Won vacant WBF International bantamweight title
9	Win	9–0	Rogen Flores	UD	8	8 Mar 2016	T'Boli Municipal Gym, T'Boli, Philippines	
8	Win	8–0	Ronerex Dalut	UD	8	27 Nov 2015	Safii Compound Gymnasium, General Santos, Philippines	
7	Win	7–0	Roland Magluyan	KO	1 (8), 0:38	26 Sep 2015	Gaisano Mall Atrium, General Santos, Philippines	
6	Win	6–0	Philip Parcon	UD	8	7 Jun 2015	Robinson’s Mall Atrium, General Santos, Philippines	
5	Win	5–0	Paulo Perono	TKO	1 (6), 1:23	8 Mar 2015	T'Boli Municipal Gym, T'Boli, Philippines	
4	Win	4–0	Marwin Cristota	TKO	3 (6), 0:34	17 Jan 2015	Oval Plaza Covered Court, General Santos, Philippines	
3	Win	3–0	Frejun Dela Cruz	TKO	6 (6), 1:32	27 Nov 2014	Safii Compound Gymnasium, General Santos, Philippines	
2	Win	2–0	Clavilaz Omayao	UD	4	5 Oct 2014	Glan Municipal Gym, Glan, Philippines	
1	Win	1–0	Lordly Pateno	UD	4	22 Aug 2014	Makati Cinema Square Boxing Arena, Makati City, Philippines	
