= Ra'eese Aleem =

American boxer (born 1990)

Personal information
- Nickname: The Beast
- Born: June 21, 1990 (age 36) Muskegon, Michigan, U.S.
- Height: 5 ft 6 in (168 cm)
- Weight: Super bantamweight; Featherweight; Super featherweight

Boxing career
- Reach: 68 1/2 in (174 cm)
- Stance: Orthodox

Boxing record
- Total fights: 24
- Wins: 23
- Win by KO: 12
- Losses: 1

Ra'eese Aleem (/rɑːˈiːs/; born June 21, 1990) is an American professional boxer.

== Professional career ==
Aleem turned professional in 2011, with a second-round technical knockout of Dewaun Bell. He amassed a 15–0 record before making his TV debut on February 14, 2020, with a third-round stoppage victory against Saul Eduardo Hernandez. On August 1, 2020, he notched a tenth-round technical knockout of Marcus Bates. Bates was a last minute replacement for Aleem when his original opponent Tramaine Williams pulled out to be elevated to the main event as Stephen Fulton's substitute when he was sick with COVID-19.

Aleem was scheduled to face Vic Pasillas for the WBA interim super-bantamweight title on January 23, 2021, at the Mohegan Sun Arena in Montville, Connecticut. He won the fight by an eleventh-round technical knockout, after knocking Pasillas down in rounds two, six, nine and once in round eleven.

Aleem was scheduled to fight Eduardo Baez for the NABO super-bantamweight title at Park MGM in Paradise, Nevada on November 27, 2021. He won by majority decision.

On September 4, 2022, at Crypto.com Arena, Los Angeles, California, he successfully defended the title with a unanimous decision win over Mike Plania.

Aleem suffered the first defeat of his professional career when he lost to Sam Goodman via split decision at the Gold Coast Convention and Exhibition Centre on the Gold Coast in Australia on June 17, 2023.

In an eliminator for a shot at the IBF featherweight title, he defeated the previously unbeaten Mikito Nakano by unanimous decision at Toyota Arena in Tokyo, Japan, on November 24, 2025.

Aleem was scheduled to challenge IBF featherweight champion Angelo Leo at the Gateway Center Arena in College Park, Georgia, on May 9, 2026. However, the fight was cancelled when he failed to make the required weight.

== Professional boxing record ==
24 fights	23 wins	1 loss
By knockout	12	0
By decision	11	1

No.	Result	Record	Opponent	Type	Round, time	Date	Location	Notes
24	Win	23–1	Mikito Nakano	UD	12	Nov 24, 2025	Toyota Arena, Tokyo, Japan	
23	Win	22–1	Rudy Garcia	UD	10	May 4, 2025	T-Mobile Arena, Paradise, Nevada, U.S.	
22	Win	21–1	Derlyn Hernandez-Gerarldo	UD	10	Nov 8, 2024	Scope Arena, Norfolk, Virginia, U.S.	
21	Loss	20–1	Sam Goodman	SD	12	Jun 17, 2023	Gold Coast Convention and Exhibition Centre, Gold Coast, Australia	
20	Win	20–0	Mike Plania	UD	10	Sep 4, 2022	Crypto.com Arena, Los Angeles, California, U.S.	Retained NABO super bantamweight title
19	Win	19–0	Eduardo Baez	MD	10	Nov 27, 2021	Park MGM, Paradise, Nevada, U.S.	Won vacant NABO super bantamweight title
18	Win	18–0	Vic Pasillas	TKO	11 (12), 1:00	Jan 23, 2021	Mohegan Sun Arena, Uncasville, Connecticut, U.S.	Won WBA interim super bantamweight title
17	Win	17–0	Marcus Bates	TKO	10 (12), 2:18	Aug 1, 2020	Mohegan Sun Arena, Uncasville, Connecticut, U.S.	
16	Win	16–0	Adam Lopez	TKO	4 (8), 1:31	Feb 14, 2020	2300 Arena, Philadelphia, Pennsylvania, U.S.	
15	Win	15–0	Saul Eduardo Hernandez	RTD	3 (8), 3:00	Oct 26, 2019	Santander Arena, Reading, Pennsylvania, U.S.	
14	Win	14–0	Ramiro Robles	TKO	1 (8), 1:51	May 10, 2019	2300 Arena, Philadelphia, Pennsylvania, U.S.	
13	Win	13–0	Derrick Wilson	TKO	5 (8), 1:53	Dec 14, 2018	Arabia Shrine Center, Houston, Texas, U.S.	
12	Win	12–0	Alcides Santiago	RTD	5 (6), 3:00	Sep 25, 2018	Wind Creek, Bethlehem, Pennsylvania, U.S.	
11	Win	11–0	Marcus Bates	UD	8	Apr 6, 2018	2300 Arena, Philadelphia, Pennsylvania, U.S.	
10	Win	10–0	DeWayne Wisdom	RTD	4 (6), 3:00	Aug 26, 2016	House of Champions Fitness Center, Indianapolis, Indiana, U.S.	
9	Win	9–0	Stephon McIntyre	UD	6	Feb 6, 2016	United Wireless Arena, Dodge City, Kansas, U.S.	
8	Win	8–0	Stephon McIntyre	RTD	3 (6), 3:00	Oct 9, 2015	Riverside Ballroom, Green Bay, Wisconsin, U.S.	
7	Win	7–0	Jose Silveria	UD	4	Aug 22, 2015	Hype Athletics, Dearborn Heights, Michigan, U.S.	
6	Win	6–0	Antoine Knight	TKO	3 (6), 0:33	Jun 12, 2015	Riverside Ballroom, Green Bay, Wisconsin, U.S.	
5	Win	5–0	Carl Currie	UD	4	Nov 29, 2014	Horseshoe Casino, Hammond, Indiana, U.S.	
4	Win	4–0	DeVonte Allen	UD	4	Jul 21, 2012	Heritage Bank Center, Cincinnati, Ohio, U.S.	
3	Win	3–0	Delano Kealohapauole	TKO	1 (4), 2:10	Jun 30, 2012	Civic Center, Holland, Michigan, U.S.	
2	Win	2–0	DeWayne Wisdom	UD	4	Mar 16, 2012	Credit Union 1 Arena, Chicago, Illinois, U.S.	
1	Win	1–0	Dewaun Bell	TKO	2 (4), 2:00	Sep 10, 2011	Civic Center, Holland, Michigan, U.S.	

Sporting positions
World boxing titles
Vacant Title last held by Brandon Figueroa	WBA super bantamweight champion Interim title January 23, 2021 – August 25, 2021	Vacant
