= Tramaine Williams =

American boxer (born 1992)

Personal information
- Nickname: The Mighty Midget
- Born: November 2, 1992 (age 33) New Haven, Connecticut, U.S.
- Height: 5 ft 4 in (163 cm)
- Weight: Super bantamweight; Featherweight

Boxing career
- Reach: 68 in (173 cm)
- Stance: Southpaw

Boxing record
- Total fights: 24
- Wins: 21
- Win by KO: 6
- Losses: 2
- No contests: 1

Tramaine Dashon Williams (born November 2, 1992) is an American professional boxer who held the IBF-USBA and WBO-NABO junior featherweight titles from 2019 to July 2020.

== Professional career ==
Williams challenged Angelo Leo for his WBO junior featherweight title on August 1, 2020, being a replacement with three days notice after Stephen Fulton tested positive for COVID-19. Before becoming the replacement, Williams was to be on the Leo-Fulton undercard fighting in a WBA title eliminator with Ra'eese Aleem. Williams lost the fight by unanimous decision.

== Professional boxing record ==
25 fights	21 wins	3 losses
By knockout	6	0
By decision	15	3
No contests	1	

No.	Result	Record	Opponent	Type	Round	Date	Location	Notes
25	Win	21–3 (1)	Dannis Aguero Arias	UD	8	Jun 6, 2025	Palace Theater, Waterbury, Connecticut, U.S.	Won vacant WBC USA Silver featherweight title
24	Loss	20–3 (1)	Kevin Walsh	SD	10	May 10, 2025	Foxwoods Resort Casino, Ledyard, Connecticut, U.S.	
23	Loss	20–2 (1)	Elijah Pierce	UD	10	Apr 22, 2023	Mohegan Sun Arena, Uncasville, Connecticut, U.S.	
22	Win	20–1 (1)	Jetro Pabustan	UD	10	Aug 12, 2022	Findlay Toyota Center, Prescott Valley, Arizona, U.S.	
21	Loss	19–1 (1)	Angelo Leo	UD	12	Aug 1, 2020	Mohegan Sun Arena, Uncasville, Connecticut, U.S.	For vacant WBO junior featherweight title
20	Win	19–0 (1)	Yenifel Vicente	UD	10	Jul 27, 2019	College Park Center, Arlington, Texas, U.S.	Won vacant IBF-USBA and WBO-NABO junior featherweight titles
19	Win	18–0 (1)	Neil John Tabanao	UD	10	Jun 29, 2019	Foxwoods Resort Casino, Ledyard, Connecticut, U.S.	
18	Win	17–0 (1)	Ernesto Guerrero	UD	8	Apr 12, 2019	The Rim, Hampton, New Hampshire, U.S.	
17	Win	16–0 (1)	José Alfredo Rodríguez	TKO	1 (6), 1:19	Feb 23, 2019	Genetti Manor, Wilkes-Barre, Pennsylvania, U.S.	
16	Win	15–0 (1)	Pedro Antonio Rodriguez	UD	6	Mar 30, 2018	Theater of Living Arts, Philadelphia, Pennsylvania, U.S.	
15	Win	14–0 (1)	Germán Meraz	UD	10	Dec 15, 2017	Riverside Epicenter, Austell, Georgia, U.S.	
14	Win	13–0 (1)	Derrick Murray	UD	10	Sep 23, 2017	Hartman Arena, Park City, Kansas, U.S.	
13	Win	12–0 (1)	William Gonzalez	KO	1 (10), 1:34	Jul 29, 2017	The Queen Mary, Long Beach, California, U.S.	
12	Win	11–0 (1)	Christopher Martin	TKO	2 (8), 1:44	Jun 17, 2017	Mandalay Bay Events Center, Paradise, Nevada, U.S.	
11	Win	10–0 (1)	Eduardo Garza	UD	8	Mar 25, 2017	Kansas Star Arena, Mulvane, Kansas, U.S.	
10	Win	9–0 (1)	Josh Bowles	TKO	6 (6), 1:36	May 30, 2015	Danbury Ice Arena, Danbury, Connecticut, U.S.	
9	NC	8–0 (1)	Raymond Chacon	NC	3 (4), 0:44	Aug 17, 2013	Laredo Energy Arena, Laredo, Texas, U.S.	Fight stopped due to accidental head butt
8	Win	8–0	Isaac Zarate	UD	6	Jun 29, 2013	WinStar World Casino, Thackerville, Oklahoma, U.S.	
7	Win	7–0	Ricardo Valencia	UD	4	Apr 27, 2013	Erwin Center, Austin, Texas, U.S.	
6	Win	6–0	John Herrera	UD	4	Mar 30, 2013	Mandalay Bay Events Center, Paradise, Nevada, U.S.	
5	Win	5–0	Rafael Casias	UD	4	Dec 15, 2012	Toyota Center, Houston, Texas, U.S.	
4	Win	4–0	Raul Carrillo	SD	4	Oct 27, 2012	County Coliseum, El Paso, Texas, U.S.	
3	Win	3–0	Jazzma Hogue	UD	4	Aug 4, 2012	Texas Station, North Las Vegas, Nevada, U.S.	
2	Win	2–0	Theo Johnson	KO	3 (4), 2:24	Jun 16, 2012	Sun Bowl, El Paso, Texas, U.S.	
1	Win	1–0	Jesse Anguiano	TKO	1 (4), 2:21	Apr 14, 2012	Mandalay Bay Events Center, Paradise, Nevada, U.S.	
