= Michael Dasmariñas =

Filipino boxer (born 1992)

Personal information
- Nickname: Hot 'N Spicy
- Nationality: Filipino
- Born: 20 August 1992 (age 34) Pili, Camarines Sur, Philippines
- Height: 5 ft 7 in (170 cm)
- Weight: Super flyweight; Bantamweight; Featherweight

Boxing career
- Reach: 66 in (168 cm)
- Stance: Southpaw

Boxing record
- Total fights: 43
- Wins: 36
- Win by KO: 24
- Losses: 5
- Draws: 2

Michael Alber Dasmariñas is a Filipino professional boxer who held the IBO bantamweight title in 2018. He also challenged for the IBO super-flyweight title in 2014 and the unified WBA (Super), IBF, and The Ring bantamweight titles in 2021.

== Professional career ==
Dasmariñas made his professional debut on 15 January 2012, scoring a four-round unanimous decision (UD) victory against Wilmar Pragata in Lipas, Philippines.

After compiling a record of 18–1 (11 KOs), he faced reigning champion Lwandile Sityatha for the IBO super-flyweight title on 13 December 2014 at the Orient Theater in East London, South Africa. The bout was placed in jeopardy when, while in the changing room before the fight, Sityatha began vomiting. After recovering he went on to defeat Dasmariñas via twelve-round split decision (SD). One judge scored the bout 118–110 in favour of Dasmariñas while the other two scored it 116–112 for Sityatha.

Following two stoppage wins, Dasmariñas faced Jhaleel Payao for the WBC Youth super-flyweight title on 12 July 2015 at the Mandaluyong Sports Center in Mandaluyong, Philippines. After suffering a cut above his right eye in the sixth round due to an accidental clash of heads, Dasmariñas captured the WBC Youth title via ten-round UD, with the judges' scorecards reading 97–92, 96–93, 96–93.

He made one successful defence of his title before defeating Edison Berwela via third-round corner retirement (RTD), capturing the vacant Philippines Boxing Federation (PBF) interim super-flyweight title on 7 March 2016 at the Town Plaza in San Fernando, Philippines. Dasmariñas moved up a weight class for his next fight, defeating Jecker Buhawe via fourth-round technical knockout (TKO) to capture the vacant PBF bantamweight title on 29 April 2016 in Muntinlupa, Philippines.

After three more wins he faced Karim Guerfi for the vacant IBO bantamweight title on 20 April 2018 at the Indoor Stadium in Singapore. Dasmariñas scored a fourth-round knockout (KO) victory to capture his first world title.

Four fights later he faced reigning champion Naoya Inoue on 19 June 2021 for the unified WBA (Super), IBF, and The Ring bantamweight titles at the Virgin Hotels Las Vegas. Dasmariñas was knocked to the floor in the second round after Inoue landed a left hook. He was knocked down twice more in the third, both from a body punch, with the latter prompting the referee to call a halt to the contest, handing Dasmariñas a third-round KO loss.

Dasmariñas fought Elijah Pierce for the vacant WBO International featherweight title at The Tabernacle in Atlanta, Georgia, USA, on 25 July 2025, losing by knockout in the ninth round.

== Professional boxing record ==
43 fights	36 wins	5 losses
By knockout	25	4
By decision	11	1
Draws	2	

No.	Result	Record	Opponent	Type	Round, time	Date	Location	Notes
43	Loss	36–5–2	Elijah Pierce	KO	9 (10), 2:01	25 Jul 2025	The Tabernacle, Atlanta, Georgia, U.S.	For vacant WBO International featherweight title.
42	Loss	36–4–2	Kyosuke Okamoto	TKO	5 (8), 1:18	29 Mar 2025	Aichi Sky Expo, Tokoname, Japan	
41	Win	36–3–2	Eduardo Esquivel	TKO	1 (10), 2:14	2 Nov 2024	Lions Centre, George Town, Cayman Islands	Won vacant WBF (Foundation) International featherweight title
40	Win	35–3–2	Jon Jon Estrada	RTD	9 (12), 3:00	22 Jun 2024	Cataingan, Masbate, Philippines	Won vacant Philippines GAB featherweight title
39	Win	34–3–2	Jorge Sanchez	TKO	6 (8), 2:35	8 Dec 2023	Lions Centre, George Town, Cayman Islands	
38	Win	33–3–2	Patrick Liukhoto	KO	4 (12), 1:10	23 May 2023	Fueste Complex, Camarines Sur, Philippines	Won vacant WBC-ABCO Silver featherweight title
37	Win	32–3–2	Ryan Rey Ponteras	UD	12	15 Oct 2022	Tacloban, Philippines	Won vacant Philippines GAB super-bantamweight title
36	Win	31–3–2	Danny Tampipi	TKO	3 (8), 1:14	12 Mar 2022	Elorde Sports Complex, Parañaque, Philippines	
35	Draw	30–3–2	Ernesto Saulong	TD	2 (8), 1:11	4 Dec 2021	Elorde Sports Complex, Parañaque, Philippines	
34	Loss	30–3–1	Naoya Inoue	KO	3 (12), 2:45	19 Jun 2021	Virgin Hotels Las Vegas, Paradise, Nevada, U.S.	For WBA (Super), IBF, and The Ring bantamweight titles
33	Win	30–2–1	Artid Bamrungauea	TKO	5 (10), 1:21	23 Aug 2019	Valenzuela, Philippines	
32	Win	29–2–1	Kenny Demecillo	UD	12	23 Mar 2019	Newport Performing Arts Theater, Pasay, Philippines	
31	Draw	28–2–1	Manyo Plange	SD	10	29 Sep 2018	Marina Bay Sands, Singapore	
30	Win	28–2	Karim Guerfi	KO	4 (12), 0:40	20 Apr 2018	Singapore Indoor Stadium, Singapore	Won vacant IBO bantamweight title
29	Win	27–2	Worawatchai Boonjan	TKO	2 (6)	20 Oct 2017	Suntec Convention and Exhibition Centre, Singapore	
28	Win	26–2	Mateo Handig	KO	8 (8), 0:52	24 Aug 2017	Makati, Philippines	
27	Win	25–2	Michael Escobia	UD	10	28 Sep 2016	Pili, Philippines	
26	Win	24–2	Jecker Buhawe	TKO	4 (10), 2:41	29 Apr 2016	Muntinlupa, Philippines	Won vacant PBF bantamweight title
25	Win	23–2	Edison Berwela	RTD	3 (10), 3:00	7 Mar 2016	San Fernando, Philippines	Won vacant PBF interim super-flyweight title
24	Win	22–2	Yuenyong Aunnawetwanit	KO	1 (10), 1:22	3 Nov 2015	EXPO Garden Hotel, Kunming, China	Retained WBC Youth super-flyweight title
23	Win	21–2	Jhaleel Payao	UD	10	11 Jul 2015	Mandaluyong Sports Center, Mandaluyong, Philippines	Won WBC Youth super-flyweight title
22	Win	20–2	Roy Lagrada	TKO	4 (6), 0:36	24 Apr 2015	Makati Cinema Square Boxing Arena, Makati, Philippines	
21	Win	19–2	Aroel Romasasa	KO	1 (8), 0:51	31 Jan 2015	Mandaluyong Sports Center, Mandaluyong, Philippines	
20	Loss	18–2	Lwandile Sityatha	SD	12	13 Dec 2014	East London, South Africa	For IBO super-flyweight title
19	Win	18–1	Oscar Raknafa	TKO	6 (10), 2:20	21 Sep 2014	Sipocot, Philippines	
18	Win	17–1	Hayato Kimura	UD	8	30 Jul 2014	Korakuen Hall, Tokyo, Japan	
17	Win	16–1	Elbert Guardario	RTD	2 (10), 3:00	26 May 2014	Capitol Convention Center, Pili, Philippines	
16	Win	15–1	Zoren Pama	TKO	3 (10), 2:38	29 Mar 2014	Capitol Convention Center, Pili, Philippines	
15	Win	14–1	Renren Pasignahin	UD	10	16 Nov 2013	Marikina, Philippines	
14	Win	13–1	Pit Anacaya	UD	10	4 Aug 2013	Agoncillo, Philippines	
13	Win	12–1	Rolando Niones	TKO	3 (8), 1:22	1 Jun 2013	Mandaluyong Sports Center, Mandaluyong, Philippines	
12	Win	11–1	Jerald Cortes	TKO	3 (8), 0:28	13 Apr 2013	Fort Bonifacio, Taguig, Philippines	
11	Win	10–1	Rolando Niones	TKO	5 (8), 1:30	11 Mar 2013	Dasmariñas, Philippines	
10	Win	9–1	Janry Canete	TKO	3 (6), 2:12	27 Jan 2013	Guiguinto, Philippines	
9	Win	8–1	Mike Espanosa	SD	8	13 Dec 2012	Fort Bonifacio, Taguig, Philippines	
8	Win	7–1	Mabert Paulino	TKO	4 (6), 1:30	28 Oct 2012	Elorde Sports Complex, Parañaque, Philippines	
7	Win	6–1	Junjie Lauza	UD	6	12 Sep 2012	Cuneta Astrodome, Pasay, Philippines	
6	Win	5–1	Nelson Zabala	UD	6	16 Aug 2012	Mandaluyong Sports Center, Mandaluyong, Philippines	
5	Win	4–1	Charlie Gabriel	TKO	3 (4), 2:26	30 Jun 2012	Makati Cinema Square Boxing Arena, Makati, Philippines	
4	Loss	3–1	Marbon Bodiongan	KO	2 (6), 1:40	21 Apr 2012	Santa Cruz Town Plaza, Santa Cruz, Philippines	
3	Win	3–0	Gerry Patenio	TKO	3 (4), 1:35	18 Feb 2012	San Juan Gym, Taytay, Philippines	
2	Win	2–0	Jimmy Viceda	TKO	4 (4), 1:41	10 Feb 2012	Mandaluyong Sports Center, Mandaluyong, Philippines	
1	Win	1–0	Wilmar Pragata	UD	4	15 Jan 2012	Lipa, Philippines	
