= Aarón Alameda =

Mexican boxer (born 1993)

Personal information
- Nickname: Fantasma
- Born: 18 August 1993 (age 33) Nogales, Sonora, Mexico
- Height: 5 ft 6 in (1.68 m)
- Weight: Super bantamweight

Boxing career
- Reach: 67 in (170 cm)
- Stance: Southpaw

Boxing record
- Total fights: 36
- Wins: 31
- Win by KO: 18
- Losses: 5

Aarón Alameda López (born 18 August 1993) is a Mexican professional boxer who challenged for the WBC super bantamweight title in 2020.

== Early life ==
Born into a family of boxers in Nogales, Sonora, Alameda naturally followed them to the gym and began boxing at the age of 13. In his first appearance at the Mexican National Olympics in 2009, he won a gold medal by defeating Diego De La Hoya, the nephew of legendary world champion Oscar De La Hoya, in the finals. The Mexican would get his revenge three years later, defeating Alameda in the same event for the gold. Alameda won gold medals at a total of three National Olympics as well as the 2013 National Championships.

== Professional career ==
Alameda made his professional debut on 5 April 2014, defeating José Luis Leal by third-round technical knockout (TKO) in Magdalena, Sonora. He ended the year with his sixth straight stoppage victory, a first-round knockout (KO) of Iván Vázquez in Monterrey. After six more wins in 2015, he knocked out Missouri native Andre Wilson on 19 January 2016 at the Club Nokia in Los Angeles, his first fight outside of his native Mexico. With a record of 23–0, he received his first title shot on 8 December 2018, defeating Venezuelan veteran Breilor Terán for the WBC FECARBOX interim super bantamweight title on the main event of a Televisa Deportes Sábados de Box card in his hometown of Nogales.

He fought only once in 2019, a third-round KO of Nicaraguan journeyman Jordan Escobar in April. He was scheduled to fight Luis Nery in a Showtime-televised WBC super bantamweight title eliminator in March 2020, but the show was cancelled due to the COVID-19 pandemic. Instead, he faced him six months later, on 26 September, for the vacant WBC super bantamweight title after Rey Vargas was stripped of his belt. After twelve rounds the judges handed Nery a unanimous decision (UD) victory with scores of 110–118, 112–116 and 113–115.

== Professional boxing record ==
36 fights	31 wins	5 losses
By knockout	18	2
By decision	13	3

No.	Result	Record	Opponent	Type	Round, time	Date	Location	Notes
35	Loss	31–4	(United States) Albert Gonzalez	KO	2 (10), 1:52	18 Jul 2026	(United States) Dignity Health Sports Park, Carson, California, U.S.	
35	Win	31–3	(Colombia) Yehison Cuello	RTD	4 (10), 3:00	11 Apr 2026	Nogales, Mexico	
33	Loss	30–3	(Dominican Republic) Yan Santana	UD	10	26 Jul 2025	(United States) Madison Square Garden Theater, New York City, New York, U.S.	
32	Win	30–2	(Argentina) Braian Ariel Arguello	UD	10	7 Feb 2025	Nogales, Mexico	
31	Win	29–2	(Mexico) Jesus Gomez Quintana	TKO	6 (8), 1:58	17 May 2024	Centro Internacional de Convenciones, Chetumal, Mexico	
30	Win	28–2	(Mexico) Adrian Robles Nungaray	TKO	7 (10)	24 Nov 2023	Cancun, Mexico	
29	Win	27–2	(Mexico) Josue Portales	TKO	2 (10), 2:09	19 Aug 2022	Nogales, Mexico	
28	Win	26–2	(Mexico) Angel Antonio Contreras	RTD	4 (8), 3:00	27 Nov 2021	(United States) Park Theater, Las Vegas, Nevada, U.S.	
27	Loss	25–2	(United States) Angelo Leo	MD	10	19 Jun 2021	(United States) Toyota Center, Houston, Texas, U.S.	
26	Loss	25–1	(Mexico) Luis Nery	UD	12	26 Sep 2020	(United States) Mohegan Sun Casino, Montville, Connecticut, U.S.	For vacant WBC super bantamweight title
25	Win	25–0	(Nicaragua) Jordan Escobar	KO	3 (8), 1:50	27 Apr 2019	Centro Regional de Deporte de Las Américas, Ecatepec, Mexico	
24	Win	24–0	(Venezuela) Breilor Terán	RTD	9 (10), 3:00	8 Dec 2018	Domo Binacional, Nogales, Mexico	Won WBC FECARBOX interim super bantamweight title
23	Win	23–0	(Mexico) Salvador Juárez	SD	8	21 Jul 2018	Hotel Ixtapa Azul, Zihuatanejo, Mexico	
22	Win	22–0	(Mexico) Édgar Lozano	UD	8	17 Mar 2018	Grand Oasis Arena, Cancún, Mexico	
21	Win	21–0	(Mexico) Juan Jiménez	TKO	2 (8), 2:22	11 Nov 2017	Palenque INFORUM, Irapuato, Mexico	
20	Win	20–0	(Mexico) Enrique Bernache	SD	8	8 Jul 2017	Auditorio Benito Juárez, Zapopan, Mexico	
19	Win	19–0	(Mexico) Édgar Jiménez	UD	8	8 Apr 2017	Oasis Hotel Complex, Cancún, Mexico	
18	Win	18–0	(Mexico) Daniel Olea	SD	8	3 Dec 2016	Centro de Convenciones, Acapulco, Mexico	
17	Win	17–0	(Mexico) Rafael Reyes	RTD	4 (8), 3:00	1 Oct 2016	Centro Regional de Deporte de Las Américas, Ecatepec, Mexico	
16	Win	16–0	(Mexico) Geovanni Zamora	UD	8	20 Aug 2016	Centro de Convenciones, Acapulco, Mexico	
15	Win	15–0	(Mexico) Hector Esnar Bobadilla	KO	3 (?)	18 Jun 2016	Deportivo Agustín Ramos Millan, Toluca, Mexico	
14	Win	14–0	(Mexico) Balam Hernández	UD	6	19 Mar 2016	Centro de Espectáculos del Recinto Ferial, Metepec, Mexico	
13	Win	13–0	(United States) Andre Wilson	KO	6 (6), 1:38	19 Jan 2016	(United States) Club Nokia, Los Angeles, California, U.S.	
12	Win	12–0	(Mexico) Santiago Estrada	UD	4	5 Dec 2015	Polideportivo Centenario, Los Mochis, Mexico	
11	Win	11–0	(Mexico) Guillermo García	UD	6	5 Sep 2015	Centro de Espectáculos del Recinto Ferial, Metepec, Mexico	
10	Win	10–0	(Mexico) Ricardo Roman	UD	4	4 July 2015	Centro de Usos Múltiples, Mazatlán, Mexico	
9	Win	9–0	(Mexico) Cesar Ramírez	UD	6	11 Apr 2015	Centro de Usos Múltiples, Mazatlán, Mexico	
8	Win	8–0	(Mexico) Juan Ángel Tovar	UD	6	14 Feb 2015	Centro de Usos Múltiples, Los Mochis, Mexico	
7	Win	7–0	(Mexico) Jesús Daniel Pérez	KO	3 (4), 0:51	24 Jan 2015	Centro de Convenciones Azul, Ixtapa, Mexico	
6	Win	6–0	(Mexico) Iván Vázquez	KO	1 (4), 1:52	6 Dec 2014	Arena José Sulaimán, Monterrey, Mexico	
5	Win	5–0	(Mexico) Aarón Olivares	KO	2 (4)	1 Nov 2014	Arena Coliseo, Mexico City, Mexico	
4	Win	4–0	(Mexico) Édgar Bacatehua	KO	2 (4), 1:01	11 Oct 2014	Gimnasio Carlos Hernandez Carrera, Nogales, Mexico	
3	Win	3–0	(Mexico) Ronald Apolinar	TKO	3 (4)	16 Sep 2014	Gimnasio Miguel Hidalgo, Puebla, Mexico	
2	Win	2–0	(Mexico) Cristian Aguilar	KO	4 (?), 2:30	30 May 2014	Gimnasio Carlos Hernandez Carrera, Nogales, Mexico	
1	Win	1–0	(Mexico) José Luis Leal	TKO	3 (6), 0:58	5 Apr 2014	Auditorio Municipal, Magdalena de Kino, Mexico	
