= Angelo Leo =

American boxer (born 1994)

Personal information
- Nickname: El Chinito ("The Chinese")
- Born: Angel Miguel Leo; May 15, 1994 (age 32) Albuquerque, New Mexico, U.S.
- Height: 5 ft 6 in (168 cm)
- Weight: Super bantamweight; Featherweight

Boxing career
- Reach: 68 in (173 cm)
- Stance: Orthodox

Boxing record
- Total fights: 27
- Wins: 26
- Win by KO: 12
- Losses: 1

Angelo Miguel Leo (born May 15, 1994) is an American professional boxer. He is a world champion in two weight classes, having held the International Boxing Federation (IBF) featherweight title since August 2024, and the World Boxing Organization (WBO) junior featherweight title from 2020 to 2021.

== Professional career ==
=== Early career ===
Leo made his professional debut on November 17, 2012, scoring a four-round majority decision (MD) victory over Jesus Xavier Pacheco (Per Ardua) at the Crowne Plaza Hotel in Albuquerque, New Mexico, with the two judges scoring the bout 40–36 and 39–37 in favour of Leo while the third scored it even at 38–38.

After compiling a record of 18–0 (8 KOs) he faced Cesar Juarez for the vacant WBO-NABO junior featherweight title on December 28, 2019, at the State Farm Arena in Atlanta, Georgia. Leo dropped his opponent to the canvas twice in round six before scoring a third knockdown in the eleventh. Juarez beat referee Jim Korb's count only for Korb to call off the contest in order to save Juarez from further punishment, awarding Leo the WBO regional title via eleventh-round technical knockout (TKO).

=== WBO junior featherweight champion ===
==== Leo vs. Williams ====
On July 9, 2020, it was revealed that the reigning WBO junior featherweight champion Emanuel Navarrete would vacate the title and move up to featherweight. The WBO accordingly ordered their #1 ranked junior featherweight contender Stephen Fulton to face the #2 ranked Leo for the vacant belt. The title bout was scheduled as the main event of an August 1 Showtime broadcast card, which took place at the Mohegan Sun Arena in Montville, Connecticut. Fulton withdrew from the bout on July 29, due to a positive COVID-19 test, and was replaced by Tramaine Williams. Neither fighter was seen as the favorite to win, as most odds-makers either had both boxers at -120 pick'em odds, or had Williams as a slight -125 favorite. Leo won the fight by unanimous decision, with scores of 117–111, 118-110 and 118–110. Leo stated his desire to make his first title defense against Fulton, saying in his post-fight interview: "The fans want it, so why not bring it on?".

==== Leo vs. Fulton ====
Leo was booked to make his first WBO junior featherweight title defense against Stephen Fulton. The fight was scheduled as the main event of a January 23, 2021, card that took place at the Mohegan Sun Arena in Montville, Connecticut, and was broadcast by Showtime. The pair was originally scheduled to face each other for the vacant title on August 1, 2020, before Fulton withdrew due to COVID-19. Leo entered his first title defense as a +135 underdog, while Fulton was seen as a -160 favorite. Fulton won the fight by unanimous decision, with scores of 118–110, 119-111 and 119–111. Fulton landed 364 to Leo's 262 total punches, and outlanded Leo 320 to 238 in power punches.

=== Continued super bantamweight career ===
Leo faced the one-time WBC super bantamweight title challenger Aarón Alameda on June 19, 2021, on the undercard of the WBC middleweight title bout between reigning champion Jermall Charlo and title challenger Juan Macias Montiel. He won the fight by majority decision. Two of the judges scored the fight 96-94 and 98-92 for Leo, while the third judge scored it as an even 95–95 draw.

=== IBF featherweight champion ===
==== Leo vs. Lopez ====
Leo fought Luis Alberto Lopez for his IBF featherweight title at Tingley Coliseum in Albuquerque, New Mexico on August 10, 2024. Leo knockout out Lopez in the tenth round to win the title, becoming a two division champion in the process. At the time of stoppage two of the judges had Leo ahead on scorecards with 86–85, 86–85, while the third judge had Lopez ahead with 86–85. The one punch knockout was immediately praised by commentator Chris Algieri as a "knockout of the year candidate" and was especially notable because Lopez was seen as having an excellent chin. The knockout remains the only one suffered by Lopez in his career.

==== Leo vs. Kameda ====
In January 5 it was reported that Leo was scheduled to make the first defense of his IBF featherweight title against Tomoki Kameda on March 29–30 in Aichi, Japan. On January 18, it was reported that the fight will now be held in Osaka, Japan on May 24. Leo won the fight by majority decision.

==== Leo vs. Aleem ====
Leo was scheduled to make the second defense of his IBF featherweight title against Ra'eese Aleem at the Gateway Center Arena in College Park, Georgia, USA, on May 9, 2026. However, Aleem missed weight and the fight was called off.

== Professional boxing record ==
| 27 fights | 26 wins | 1 loss |
|---|---|---|
| By knockout | 12 | 0 |
| By decision | 14 | 1 |

| No. | Result | Record | Opponent | Type | Round, time | Date | Location | Notes |
|---|---|---|---|---|---|---|---|---|
| 27 | Win | 26–1 | Tomoki Kameda | MD | 12 | May 24, 2025 | Intex Osaka, Osaka, Japan | Retained IBF featherweight title |
| 26 | Win | 25–1 | Luis Alberto Lopez | KO | 10 (12), 1:16 | Aug 10, 2024 | Tingley Coliseum, Albuquerque, New Mexico, U.S. | Won IBF featherweight title |
| 25 | Win | 24–1 | Eduardo Baez | UD | 10 | Apr 10, 2024 | Whitesands Events Center, Plant City, Florida, U.S. | Retained WBA Continental (North America) featherweight title |
| 24 | Win | 23–1 | Mike Plania | KO | 3 (10), 2:27 | Jan 31, 2024 | Whitesands Events Center, Plant City, Florida, U.S. | Won vacant WBA Continental (North America) featherweight title |
| 23 | Win | 22–1 | Nicolas Polanco | TKO | 9 (10), 1:59 | Nov 1, 2023 | Whitesands Events Center, Plant City, Florida, U.S. | |
| 22 | Win | 21–1 | Aarón Alameda | MD | 10 | Jun 19, 2021 | Toyota Center, Houston, Texas, U.S. | |
| 21 | Loss | 20–1 | Stephen Fulton | UD | 12 | Jan 23, 2021 | Mohegan Sun Arena, Montville, Connecticut, U.S. | Lost WBO junior featherweight title |
| 20 | Win | 20–0 | Tramaine Williams | UD | 12 | Aug 1, 2020 | Mohegan Sun Arena, Montville, Connecticut, U.S. | Won vacant WBO junior featherweight title |
| 19 | Win | 19–0 | Cesar Juarez | TKO | 11 (12), 1:12 | Dec 28, 2019 | State Farm Arena, Atlanta, Georgia, U.S. | Won vacant NABO junior featherweight title |
| 18 | Win | 18–0 | Mark John Yap | UD | 10 | Jun 28, 2019 | Sam's Town Hotel and Gambling Hall, Sunrise Manor, Nevada, U.S. | |
| 17 | Win | 17–0 | Neil John Tabano | UD | 10 | Apr 5, 2019 | Sam's Town Hotel and Gambling Hall, Sunrise Manor, Nevada, U.S. | |
| 16 | Win | 16–0 | Alberto Torres | UD | 8 | Feb 9, 2019 | Dignity Health Sports Park, Carson, California, U.S. | |
| 15 | Win | 15–0 | Erik Ruiz | UD | 8 | Dec 7, 2018 | Sam's Town Hotel and Gambling Hall, Sunrise Manor, Nevada, U.S. | |
| 14 | Win | 14–0 | Glenn Porras | KO | 1 (8), 1:37 | Oct 27, 2018 | Sam's Town Hotel and Gambling Hall, Sunrise Manor, Nevada, U.S. | |
| 13 | Win | 13–0 | Sharone Carter | UD | 8 | Aug 3, 2018 | Sam's Town Hotel and Gambling Hall, Sunrise Manor, Nevada, U.S. | |
| 12 | Win | 12–0 | Jonathan Aguilar | UD | 6 | Jan 27, 2018 | Sam's Town Hotel and Gambling Hall, Sunrise Manor, Nevada, U.S. | |
| 11 | Win | 11–0 | Basilio Nieves | KO | 4 (6), 2:04 | Nov 18, 2017 | Cosmopolitan of Las Vegas, Paradise, Nevada, U.S. | |
| 10 | Win | 10–0 | Jorge Luis Falcón | KO | 3 (6), 1:47 | Aug 13, 2016 | Gimnasio Municipal, Nuevo Casas Grandes, Mexico | |
| 9 | Win | 9–0 | Iván Chavela Resendiz | KO | 2 (6), 0:50 | May 14, 2016 | Macroplaza, Nuevo Casas Grandes, Mexico | |
| 8 | Win | 8–0 | Jesús Reyes | KO | 4 (6), 2:59 | Mar 5, 2016 | Centro Civico, Ascensión, Mexico | |
| 7 | Win | 7–0 | Stephon McIntyre | UD | 6 | Aug 15, 2015 | Civic Center, Albuquerque, New Mexico, U.S. | |
| 6 | Win | 6–0 | Gabriel Braxton | TKO | 2 (6), 1:14 | May 9, 2015 | Camel Rock Casino, Santa Fe, New Mexico, U.S. | |
| 5 | Win | 5–0 | James Piar | KO | 3 (6), 0:58 | May 10, 2014 | Buffalo Thunder Casino, Pojoaque, New Mexico, U.S. | |
| 4 | Win | 4–0 | Michael James Herrera | KO | 1 (4), 0:48 | Jan 25, 2014 | Buffalo Thunder Casino, Pojoaque, New Mexico, U.S. | |
| 3 | Win | 3–0 | Brian Garcia | MD | 4 | Sep 6, 2013 | Buffalo Thunder Casino, Pojoaque, New Mexico, U.S. | |
| 2 | Win | 2–0 | Julio Gomez | UD | 4 | Jan 19, 2013 | Sky Ute Casino, Ignacio, Colorado, U.S. | |
| 1 | Win | 1–0 | Jesus Pacheco | MD | 4 | Nov 17, 2012 | Crowne Plaza Hotel, Albuquerque, New Mexico, U.S. | |

== See also ==
- List of Mexican boxing world champions
- List of world super-bantamweight boxing champions
- List of world featherweight boxing champions

Sporting positions
Regional boxing titles
| Vacant Title last held by Tramaine Williams | NABO junior featherweight champion December 28, 2019 – August 1, 2020; Won world title | Vacant Title next held by Ra'eese Aleem |
| New title | WBA Continental North America featherweight champion January 31, 2024 – August 10, 2024; Won world title | Vacant |
World boxing titles
| Vacant Title last held by Emanuel Navarrete | WBO junior featherweight champion August 1, 2020 – January 23, 2021 | Succeeded by Stephen Fulton |
| Preceded by Luis Alberto Lopez | IBF featherweight champion August 10, 2024 – present | Incumbent |
