= Sulaiman Segawa =

Ugandan boxer

Personal information
- Nickname: The Ruler
- Born: 22 May 1991 (age 35) Kampala, Uganda
- Height: 5 ft 8 in (173 cm)
- Weight: Featherweight; Super featherweight; Lightweight

Boxing career
- Reach: 69 in (175 cm)
- Stance: Southpaw

Boxing record
- Total fights: 24
- Wins: 18
- Win by KO: 7
- Losses: 6
- Draws: 1
- No contests: 1

Segawa Sulaiman (commonly known as The RULER) (born May 22, 1991) is a Ugandan born-American based professional boxer. He has southpaw style of fighting. He made his professional debut on 21 April 2013 at the age of 21.

As of October 2, he is ranked 45 out of 1547 best pro-boxer in the world according to BoxRec. Segawa holds the 2023 WBC SILVER/NABF USA TITLE, 2019 National Boxing Association Intercontinental Champion title. In 2016 Sulaiman was part of the Ugandan olympic selection that prepared at the Eindhoven Box Cup for the Rio '16 Olympic games. Sulaiman won a silver medal on the Eindhoven Box Cup, however non of the boxers of the selection returned to Uganda. While in the Netherlands he adopted a Dutch style approach of kickboxing.

== Early career ==
He was born on 22 May 1991 in Kampala, Uganda. In 2014, Segawa was recruited by UK-based Atlantic Entertainment. He had over 240 amateur fights.

== Professional career ==
His professional career began on 21 April 2013, when he won four round bouts fighting with Armstrong Mwanje. The fight was held at Sabrina`s Pub in Kampala. From 2015 to 2017, Segawa was based in Team Holzken, Helmond with coach Sjef Weber and legend Nieky Holzken in the Netherlands training and fighting kickboxing. While in Netherlands, he made a winning debut against Dijbby Diagne, the fight took place at Theater de Borenburg, Voerendaal on 14 January 2017. In 2018, Segawa transferred to USA.

== Professional boxing record ==
26 fights	18 wins	6 losses
By knockout	7	1
By decision	11	5
Draws	1	
No contests	1	

No.	Result	Record	Opponent	Type	Round, time	Date	Location	Notes
26	Loss	18–6–1 (1)	Rene Palacios	SD	10	30 Jan 2026	Maryland Live Casino, Hanover, Maryland, U.S.	
25	Win	18–5–1 (1)	Bryan Acosta	TKO	7 (10), 2:59	05 Sep 2025	Entertainment and Sports Arena, Washington, D.C., U.S.	
24	Loss	17–5–1 (1)	Bruce Carrington	MD	10	27 Sep 2024	The Theater at Madison Square Garden, New York City, New York, U.S.	Lost WBC Silver featherweight title
23	Win	17–4–1 (1)	Ruben Villa	UD	10	13 Jul 2024	Palms Casino Resort, Paradise, Nevada, U.S.	Won WBC Silver featherweight title
22	Loss	16–4–1 (1)	Mirco Cuello	UD	8	30 Mar 2024	T-Mobile Arena, Paradise, Nevada, U.S.	
21	Win	16–3–1 (1)	Prince Octopus Dzanie	UD	10	30 Sep 2023	Patapsco Arena, Baltimore, Maryland, U.S.	Retained WBC USA featherweight title
20	Win	15–3–1 (1)	Misael López	TKO	10 (10), 2:26	6 May 2023	Entertainment and Sport Arena, Washington, D.C., U.S.	Won vacant WBC USA featherweight title
19	Win	14–3–1 (1)	Ernesto Guerrero	KO	4 (8), 0:57	19 Nov 2022	Entertainment and Sports Arena, Washington, D.C., U.S.	
18	NC	13–3–1 (1)	Cobia Breedy	NC	1 (10), 3:00	29 Oct 2021	Entertainment and Sports Arena, Washington, D.C., U.S.	For vacant WBC Continental Americas featherweight title
17	Loss	13–3–1	Jamaine Ortiz	KO	7 (8), 2:50	28 Nov 2020	Staples Center, Los Angeles, California, U.S.	For vacant WBC USA Silver lightweight title
16	Draw	13–2–1	Zhora Hamazaryan	SD	8	31 Jan 2020	Hirsch Coliseum, Shreveport, Louisiana, U.S.	
15	Win	13–2	Elijah Pierce	MD	8	28 Sep 2019	Buckhead Theatre, Atlanta, Georgia, U.S.	Won WBC Silver featherweight title
14	Win	12–2	Gadwin Rosa	UD	8	26 Apr 2019	The Met, Philadelphia, Pennsylvania, U.S.	
13	Loss	11–2	Abraham Nova	UD	10	18 Nov 2018	Royale Nightclub, Boston, Massachusetts, U.S.	For vacant NABF super-featherweight title
12	Win	11–1	Hectór López Jr.	RTD	6 (8), 3:00	10 Aug 2018	Red Rock Casino Resort, Summerlin South, Nevada, U.S.	
11	Loss	10–1	William Foster III	UD	8	28 Apr 2018	Plainridge Park Casino, Plainville, Massachusetts, U.S.	For vacant NABF Junior super-featherweight title
10	Win	10–0	Alejandro Salinas	UD	8	24 Mar 2108	St. Lucy Hall, Campbell, Ohio, U.S.	
9	Win	9–0	Brian Gallegos	SD	6	17 Feb 2018	Mandalay Bay Events Center, Paradise, Nevada, U.S.	
8	Win	8–0	Bilal Messoudi	PTS	4	1 Apr 2017	Sportschool Golden Glory, Helmond, Netherlands	
7	Win	7–0	Dijbby Diagne	PTS	6	14 Jan 2017	Theater de Borenburg, Voerendaal, Netherlands	
6	Win	6–0	Hakim Waibale	UD	8	30 Oct 2015	Kampala Hilton Hotel, Kampala, Uganda	
5	Win	5–0	Mwinyi Mzengela	KO	2 (6)	29 Aug 2015	Nakivubo Stadium, Kampala, Uganda	
4	Win	4–0	Ali Kasango	UD	10	2 May 2015	Sabrina's Pub, Kampala, Uganda	
3	Win	3–0	Herve Zongo	TKO	6 (8)	1 Nov 2013	Little Flowers Arena, Kamapla, Uganda	
2	Win	2–0	Joshua Mbogo	TKO	2 (6)	7 Jul 2013	MTN Arena Lugogo, Kampala, Uganda	
1	Win	1–0	Armstrong Mwanje	UD	6	21 Apr 2013	Sabrina's Pub, Kampala, Uganda	

== Personal life ==
Currently, Segawa is based in Silver Spring, Maryland, USA where he doubles as a fighter and a Personal trainer at Urban Boxing DC.

== See also ==
- List of male boxers
- List of southpaw stance boxers

Sporting positions
Regional boxing titles
Vacant Title last held by Adan Ochoa	WBC USA featherweight champion 6 May 2023 – 2023; Vacated	Vacant Title next held by Miguel Flores
Preceded by Ruben Villa	WBC Silver featherweight champion 13 July 2024 – 27 September 2024	Succeeded by Bruce Carrington
