= Alexandro Santiago =

Mexican boxer

Personal information
- Nickname: Peque
- Born: Agustín Alexandro Santiago Barrios; February 7, 1996 (age 30) Tijuana, Baja California, Mexico
- Height: 5 ft 2 1/2 in (159 cm)
- Weight: Super flyweight; Bantamweight; Super bantamweight

Boxing career
- Reach: 65 1/2 in (166 cm)
- Stance: Orthodox

Boxing record
- Total fights: 42
- Wins: 31
- Win by KO: 17
- Losses: 6
- Draws: 5

Agustín Alexandro Santiago Barrios (born 7 February 1996) is a Mexican professional boxer who held the World Boxing Council (WBC) bantamweight title from 2023 to 2024.

== Professional career ==
=== WBC bantamweight champion ===
After Naoya Inoue moved up to super bantamweight, vacating his undisputed bantamweight titles, it was announced that the WBC has approved a WBC Bantamweight championship bout between Santiago and former 40 year old four-division world champion Nonito Donaire. On July 13, 2023, it was announced the bout would be moved to Errol Spence Jr. vs. Terence Crawford undercard. On July 29, Santiago defeated Donaire in very close fight via unanimous decision.

== Professional boxing record ==
42 fights	31 wins	6 losses
By knockout	17	1
By decision	14	5
Draws	5	

No.	Result	Record	Opponent	Type	Round, time	Date	Location	Notes
42	Win	31–6–5	Alexis Molina Aguirre	TKO	9 (10), 2:19	Sep 12, 2026	Gimnasio Miguel Hidalgo, Puebla, Puebla, Mexico	Retained WBA Fedelatin Mexico super bantamweight title
41	Loss	30–6–5	Alessio Lorusso	UD	10	Jun 21, 2026	Palasport Fabrizio De Chiara, Cologno Monzese, Lombardia, Italy	For IBO Inter-Continental super bantamweight title
40	Win	30–5–5	Ismael Garnica Gordillo	TKO	8 (10), 1:58	Mar 13, 2026	Hipódromo Caliente, Arena Tecate, Tijuana, Baja California, Mexico	Won vacant WBA Fedelatin Mexico super bantamweight title
39	Win	29–5–5	Ruben Antonio Tostado Garcia	TKO	3 (10), 2:48	Dec 13, 2025	Salon La Candelaria, Tijuana, Baja California, Mexico	
38	Loss	28–5–5	Jose Miguel Calderon	MD	10	Nov 30, 2024	Grand Hotel, Tijuana, Baja California, Mexico	For vacant WBC Latino bantamweight title
37	Loss	28–4–5	Junto Nakatani	TKO	6 (12), 1:12	Feb 24, 2024	Ryōgoku Kokugikan, Tokyo, Japan	Lost WBC bantamweight title
36	Win	28–3–5	Nonito Donaire	UD	12	Jul 29, 2023	T-Mobile Arena, Paradise, Nevada, U.S.	Won vacant WBC bantamweight title
35	Win	27–3–5	Antonio Nieves	RTD	7 (10) 3:00	Oct 29, 2022	Gila River Arena, Glendale, Arizona, U.S.	
34	Win	26–3–5	David Carmona	UD	10	Jul 29, 2022	Estadio American Box, Montevideo, Uruguay	Won vacant Mexican super bantamweight title
33	Win	25–3–5	Juan Ramirez Marquez	UD	10	Mar 25, 2022	Big Punch Arena, Tijuana, Baja California, Mexico	
32	Loss	24–3–5	Gary Antonio Russell	MD	10	Nov 27, 2021	Park Theater, Las Vegas, Nevada, U.S.	
31	Win	24–2–5	Juan Gabriel Medina	KO	2 (8) 2:59	May 29, 2021	Dignity Health Sports Park, Carson, California, U.S.	
30	Win	23–2–5	Erick Gonzalez Hernandez	RTD	4 (10) 3:00	Dec 8, 2020	Cadena, Baja California, Mexico	
29	Win	22–2–5	Willibaldo García	MD	10	Sep 21, 2020	Cadena, Baja California, Mexico	Retained WBC International bantamweight title
28	Win	21–2–5	Roberto Sanchez Cantu	TKO	8 (10) 0:43	Nov 22, 2019	Auditorio Municipal, Tijuana, Baja California, Mexico	Won vacant WBC International bantamweight title
27	Win	20–2–5	Andres Garcia Guzman	KO	4 (8) 1:36	Jul 26, 2019	Gimnasio Burocratas, Tijuana, Baja California, Mexico	
26	Win	19–2–5	Marco Antonio Monteros	TKO	5 (8) 2:57	May 18, 2019	Cheer's Bar, Tijuana, Baja California, Mexico	
25	Win	18–2–5	Alfredo Mejia Vargas	UD	8	Apr 6, 2019	Cheer's Bar, Tijuana, Baja California, Mexico	
24	Win	17–2–5	Juan Higuera Villanueva	RTD	1 (8) 3:00	Feb 22, 2019	Cheer's Bar, Tijuana, Baja California, Mexico	
23	Draw	16–2–5	Jerwin Ancajas	SD	12	Sep 28, 2018	Oracle Arena, Oakland, California, U.S.	For IBF super flyweight title
22	Draw	16–2–4	Jose L. Martinez-Mercado	SD	10	Mar 24, 2018	Complejo Ferial, Ponce, Puerto Rico	For NABO super-flyweight title
21	Win	16–2–3	David Godinez	KO	? (8) 2:58	Dec 8, 2017	Gimnasio Independencia, Tijuana, Baja California, Mexico	
20	Win	15–2–3	Efrain Gonzalez	UD	6	Oct 21, 2017	Swatmeet Las Californias, Tijuana, Baja California, Mexico	
19	Win	14–2–3	Samuel Medina	KO	3 (8) 0:52	May 26, 2017	Salon Mezzanine, Tijuana, Baja California, Mexico	
18	Win	13–2–3	Oskar Jesus Talla Davalos	TKO	6 (6) 2:01	Mar 4, 2017	Rosarito, Baja California, Mexico	
17	Draw	12–2–3	Jose L. Martinez-Mercado	MD	8	Nov 12, 2016	Complejo Ferial, Ponce, Puerto Rico	
16	Win	12–2–2	Luis Lozano	TKO	1 (6) 0:37	Sep 24, 2016	Plaza de Toros Caliente, Tijuana, Baja California, Mexico	
15	Draw	11–2–2	Antonio Nieves	SD	10	Aug 19, 2016	Rhinos Stadium, Rochester, New York, USA	For vacant WBO-NABO bantamweight title
14	Win	11–2–1	Mario Lara Rivera	UD	8	Mar 17, 2016	Billar El Perro Salado, Tijuana, Baja California, Mexico	
13	Win	10–2–1	Efrain Gonzalez	UD	8	Oct 23, 2015	Gimnasio Independencia, Tijuana, Baja California, Mexico	
12	Win	9–2–1	Angel Barcenas	UD	6	Aug 14, 2015	Avenida Revolucion, Tijuana, Baja California, Mexico	
11	Loss	8–2–1	Johnny Michel Garcia	SD	6	Nov 15, 2014	Plaza de Toros, Cancun, Quintana Roo, Mexico	
10	Win	8–1–1	Francisco Landeros	UD	6	Apr 5, 2014	Caliente Racetrack, Tijuana, Baja California, Mexico	
9	Loss	7–1–1	Hector Flores	UD	6	Dec 21, 2013	Caliente Racetrack, Tijuana, Baja California, Mexico	
8	Win	7–0–1	Jaziel Escobedo Brunn	SD	6	Oct 26, 2013	Caliente Racetrack, Tijuana, Baja California, Mexico	
7	Win	6–0–1	Francisco Landeros	UD	4	Sep 27, 2013	Caliente Racetrack, Tijuana, Baja California, Mexico	
6	Win	5–0–1	Felix Rubio	UD	6	Aug 10, 2013	Caliente Racetrack, Tijuana, Baja California, Mexico	
5	Win	4–0–1	Felix Rubio	UD	4	Jun 28, 2013	Forum Tecate, Tijuana, Baja California, Mexico	
4	Draw	3–0–1	Hector Flores	SD	4	May 11, 2013	Caliente Racetrack, Tijuana, Baja California, Mexico	
3	Win	3–0	Pablo Lopez	TKO	3 (4) 2:37	Apr 10, 2013	Salon Las Pulgas, Tijuana, Baja California, Mexico	
2	Win	2–0	Jose Lopez	TKO	1 (4) 0:51	Feb 9, 2013	Arena ITSON, Ciudad Obregon, Sonora, Mexico	
1	Win	1–0	Mario Valdez	TKO	2 (4) 2:24	Dec 21, 2012	Auditorio Ernesto Rufo, Rosarito, Baja California, Mexico	

== See also ==
- List of male boxers
- List of Mexican boxing world champions
- List of world bantamweight boxing champions

Sporting positions
Regional boxing titles
Vacant Title last held by Duke Micah	WBC International bantamweight champion November 22, 2019 – 2021; Vacated	Vacant Title next held by Kash Farooq
Vacant Title last held by Daniel Noriega	Mexican super-bantamweight champion July 29, 2022 – July 29, 2023; Won world title	Vacant
World boxing titles
Vacant Title last held by Naoya Inoue	WBC bantamweight champion July 29, 2023 – February 24, 2024	Succeeded by Junto Nakatani
