= Antonio Nieves =

American boxer

Personal information
- Nickname: Carita
- Born: Antonio Jose Nieves; May 25, 1987 (age 39) Cleveland, Ohio, U.S.
- Height: 5 ft 4 in (163 cm)
- Weight: Junior bantamweight; Bantamweight

Boxing career
- Reach: 68.5 in (174 cm)
- Stance: Orthodox

Boxing record
- Total fights: 26
- Wins: 20
- Win by KO: 11
- Losses: 4
- Draws: 2

Antonio Jose Nieves (born May 25, 1987) is an American professional boxer who challenged for the World Boxing Organization junior bantamweight title in 2017.

== Amateur career ==
Nieves is a multiple-time Cleveland Golden Gloves open champion and was national runner-up in 2011.

== Regional title ==
As Nieves rose in the rankings he defeated multiple-time world title challenger Lorenzo Trejo. He defeated Oscar Mojica to win the North American Boxing Organization bantamweight title.

On March 10, 2017 Nieves defend his North American Boxing Organization title against Nikolai Potapov on ShoBox. He lost the defense by split decision.

== World title attempt ==
Nieves fought Naoya Inoue for the WBO junior bantamweight world title. He lost by 6th round technical knockout due to a corner stoppage.

== Professional boxing record ==
26 fights	20 wins	4 losses
By knockout	11	2
By decision	9	2
Draws	2	

No.	Result	Record	Opponent	Type	Round, time	Date	Location	Notes
26	Loss	20–4–2	(Mexico) Alexandro Santiago	RTD	7 (10), 3:00	Oct 29, 2022	(United States) Desert Diamond Arena, Glendale, Arizona U.S.	
25	Win	20–3–2	(Philippines) Judy Flores	UD	8	May 21, 2021	(United States) The Civic Center, Cleveland Heights, Ohio, U.S.	
24	Loss	19–3–2	(United States) Joshua Greer Jr.	UD	10	Oct 26, 2019	(United States) Sparks Convention Center, Reno, Nevada, U.S.	For WBC Continental Americas and WBO–NABO bantamweight titles
23	Win	19–2–2	(Mexico) José Alfredo Rodríguez	TKO	2 (8), 1:11	Jun 8, 2019	(United States) Northfield, Ohio, U.S.	
22	Win	18–2–2	(Mexico) Christian Esquivel	KO	3 (8), 0:56	Jul 28, 2018	(United States) Hollywood Casino, Columbus, Ohio, U.S.	
21	Loss	17–2–2	(Japan) Naoya Inoue	RTD	6 (12), 3:00	Sep 9, 2017	(United States) StubHub Center, Carson, California, U.S.	For WBO junior bantamweight title
20	Loss	17–1–2	(Russia) Nikolai Potapov	SD	10	Mar 10, 2017	(United States) MGM Grand, Detroit, Michigan, U.S.	Lost WBO–NABO bantamweight title
19	Win	17–0–2	(Hungary) Szilveszter Ajtai	TKO	2 (6), 0:46	Nov 26, 2016	(United States) Firebird Athletic Center, Bedford, Ohio, U.S.	
18	Draw	16–0–2	(Mexico) Alexandro Santiago	SD	10	Aug 19, 2016	(United States) Rhinos Stadium, Rochester, New York, U.S.	Retained WBO–NABO bantamweight title
17	Win	16–0–1	(United States) Oscar Mojica	UD	10	Jun 18, 2016	(United States) Meadows Racetrack and Casino, Washington, Pennsylvania, U.S.	Won vacant WBO–NABO bantamweight title
16	Win	15–0–1	(Hungary) Tibor Nadori	KO	3 (8)	Feb 13, 2016	(United States) Mountaineer Casino, Racetrack and Resort, Chester, West Virginia, U.S.	
15	Win	14–0–1	(Mexico) Lorenzo Trejo	KO	1 (6), 2:34	Nov 25, 2015	(United States) Bayfront Convention Center, Erie, Pennsylvania, U.S.	
14	Win	13–0–1	(South Korea) Tae Woong Jung	UD	6	Sep 5, 2015	(United States) Presque Isle Downs and Casino, Erie, Pennsylvania, U.S.	
13	Draw	12–0–1	(United States) Stephon Young	SD	8	Jun 20, 2015	(United States) Oracle Arena, Oakland, California, U.S.	
12	Win	12–0	(Hungary) Gabor Molnar	KO	1 (8), 1:57	Jun 6, 2015	(United States) Presque Isle Downs and Casino, Erie, Pennsylvania, U.S.	
11	Win	11–0	(Spain) Saul Tejada	UD	8	Mar 28, 2015	(United States) Resorts World Casino, Queens, New York, U.S.	
10	Win	10–0	(United States) DeWayne Wisdom	RTD	5 (6)	Dec 20, 2014	(United States) Island Casino Racetrack, Wheeling, West Virginia, U.S.	
9	Win	9–0	(Puerto Rico) Jovany Fuentes	UD	6	Nov 14, 2014	(United States) CONSOL Energy Center, Pittsburgh, Pennsylvania, U.S.	
8	Win	8–0	(United States) Justin Lopez	UD	6	Aug 15, 2014	(United States) Grand Plaza Hotel, Toledo, Ohio, U.S.	
7	Win	7–0	(Mexico) Angel Carvajal	TKO	6 (6), 0:54	Jul 11, 2014	(United States) Rivers Casino, Pittsburgh, Pennsylvania, U.S.	
6	Win	6–0	(United States) Adalberto Tapia	KO	1 (4), 2:59	May 17, 2014	(United States) Mountaineer Casino, Racetrack and Resort, Chester, West Virginia, U.S.	
5	Win	5–0	(United States) Brian Raglin	TKO	1 (4), 1:28	Nov 30, 2013	(United States) Mountaineer Casino, Racetrack and Resort, Chester, West Virginia, U.S.	
4	Win	4–0	(Puerto Rico) Hector Gonzalez	KO	3 (4), 1:41	Apr 20, 2013	Coliseo Manuel Iguina, Arecibo, Puerto Rico	
3	Win	3–0	(United States) Rafael Gramajo	UD	4	Nov 24, 2012	(United States) Premier Soccer Academy, Lorain, Ohio, U.S.	
2	Win	2–0	(United States) Jesus Gonzales	MD	4	May 19, 2012	(United States) La Villa Banquet Center, Cleveland, Ohio, U.S.	
1	Win	1–0	(United States) DeWayne Wisdom	UD	4	Nov 12, 2011	(United States) La Villa Banquet Center, Cleveland, Ohio, U.S.	

== Personal life ==
He works for PNC Bank as a personal banker. He lost his sister in October, 2016 as a murder victim.

Sporting positions
Regional boxing titles
Vacant Title last held by Alexis Santiago	WBO–NABO bantamweight champion June 18, 2016 – March 10, 2017	Succeeded by Nikolai Potapov
