= Mirco Cuello =

Argentine boxer (born 2000)

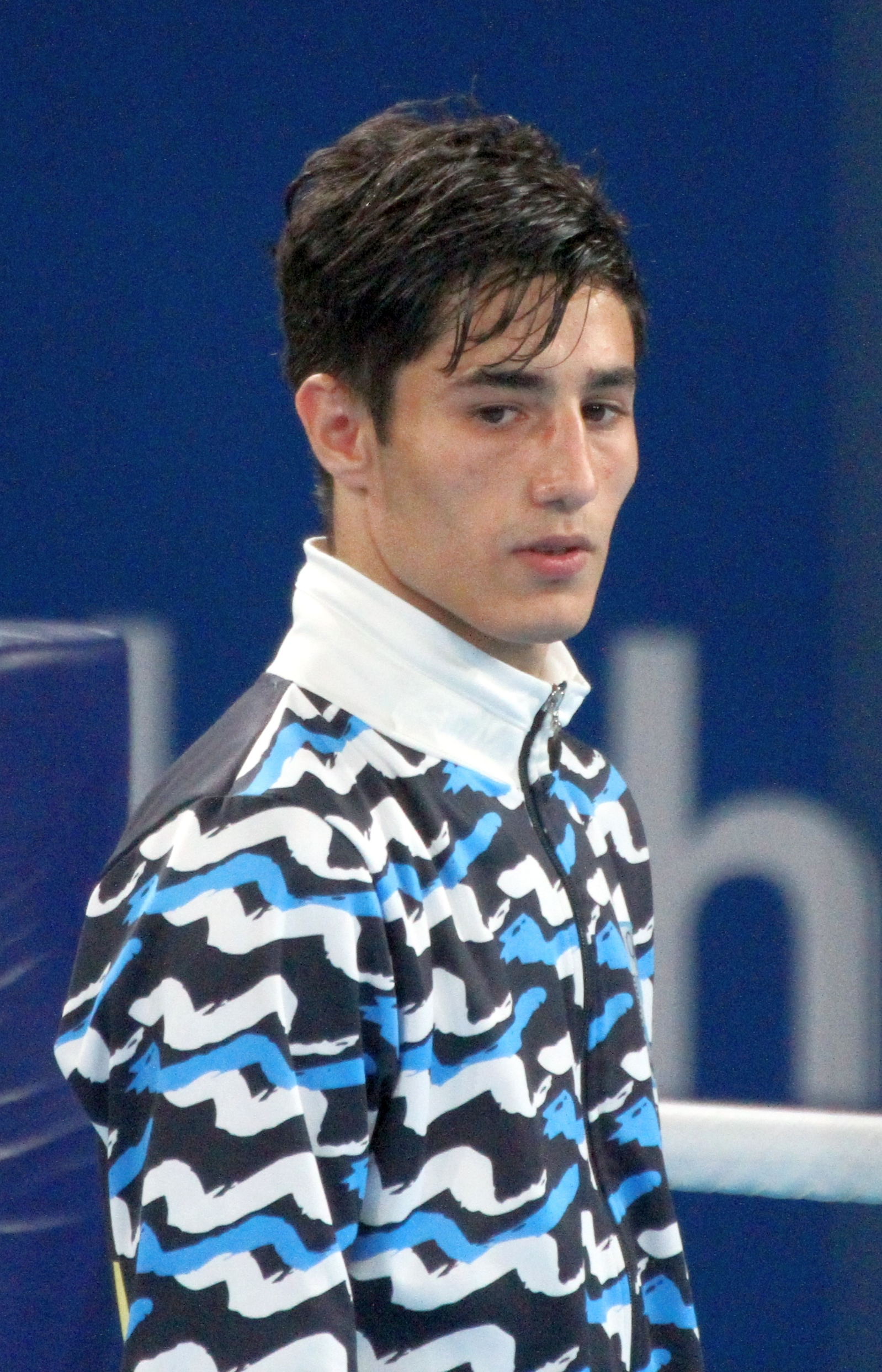
- Mirco Cuello in 2018

Personal information
- Born: Mirco Jehiel Cuello; 21 September 2000 (age 26) Arroyo Seco, Santa Fe, Argentina
- Height: 5 ft 7 in (170 cm)
- Weight: Featherweight

Boxing career
- Stance: Orthodox

Boxing record
- Total fights: 16
- Wins: 16
- Win by KO: 13
Medal record
Men's amateur boxing
Representing Argentina
Youth Olympic Games
Bronze medal – third place	2018 Buenos Aires	Bantamweight

Mirco Jehiel Cuello (born 21 September 2000) is an Argentine professional boxer. As an amateur, Cuello captured the bronze medal in the bantamweight event of the 2018 Summer Youth Olympics.

== Professional boxing career ==
Cuello made his professional debut against Akihiro Nakamura on 7 November 2020. He won the fight by a first-round knockout. Cuello next met the winless Jayvonne O'Neal on 12 December 2020. He once again won the fight by a first-round knockout. Cuello faced the undefeated Franco Facundo Huanque on 20 February 2021. He won the fight by a fourth-round knockout.

For his fourth professional appearance, Cuello was booked to face the 22-fight veteran Hector Rolando Gusman on 27 March 2021. He won the fight by a first-round knockout. Cuello faced another undefeated opponent, Jorge Almanza, on 13 November 2021. He won the fight by a second-round technical knockout. In his final fight of the year, Cuello overcame Sergio Armando Villalobos by unanimous decision, the first decision victory of his professional career.

Cuello faced the 21–4 Leonardo Padilla for the vacant WBA International featherweight title on 23 June 2022. He won the fight by a second-round technical knockout. Three months later, on 3 September 2022, Cuello faced the undefeated Michel Da Silva for the vacant South American featherweight title. He won the fight by a first-round technical knockout.

Cuello made his first WBA International featherweight title defense against the undefeated Leivy Frias on 21 January 2023. He retained the title by a first-round technical knockout.

On 30 March 2024, Cuello faced Sulaiman Segawa in an 8-round featherweight bout at the T-Mobile Arena in Las Vegas, Nevada. Cuello won the fight by unanimous decision.

Cuello is scheduled to face Christian Olivo Barreda on 1 February 2025 at T-Mobile Arena in Las Vegas, Nevada. Cuello won the fight by bodyshot TKO in the 10th round.

== Professional boxing record ==
16 fights	16 wins	0 losses
By knockout	13	0
By decision	3	0

No.	Result	Record	Opponent	Type	Round, time	Date	Location	Notes
16	Win	16–0	Sergio Rios Jimenez	KO	2 (12), 2:53	8 Aug 2025	Benina Martyrs Stadium, Benghazi, Libya	Won vacant WBA interim featherweight title
15	Win	15–0	Christian Olivo	TKO	10 (10), 0:59	1 Feb 2025	T-Mobile Arena, Paradise, Nevada, U.S.	
14	Win	14–0	Sulaiman Segawa	UD	8	30 Mar 2024	T-Mobile Arena, Paradise, Nevada, U.S.	
13	Win	13–0	Rudy Garcia	UD	10	15 Sep 2023	Boeing Center at Tech Port, San Antonio, Texas, U.S.	
12	Win	12–0	Antonio Guzman	TKO	1 (10), 2:00	22 Jul 2023	Radisson Victoria Plaza, Montevideo, Uruguay	Retained South American featherweight title
11	Win	11–0	Flecher Silva	KO	6 (10), 2:53	1 Apr 2023	Radisson Victoria Plaza, Montevideo, Uruguay	Won vacant South American featherweight title
10	Win	10–0	Leivy Frias	TKO	1 (10), 2:32	21 Jan 2023	Hotel El Panama, Panama City, Panama	Retained WBA International featherweight title
9	Win	9–0	Michel Da Silva	TKO	1 (10), 2:32	3 Sep 2022	Casino Buenos Aires, Buenos Aires, Argentina	Won vacant South American featherweight title
8	Win	8–0	Leonardo Padilla	TKO	2 (10), 2:48	23 Jun 2022	Casino Buenos Aires, Buenos Aires, Argentina	Won vacant WBA International featherweight title
7	Win	7–0	Sergio Armando Villalobos	UD	10	17 Dec 2021	San Juan de los Lagos, Mexico	
6	Win	6–0	Jorge Almanza	TKO	2 (8), 2:47	13 Nov 2021	Coliseo Zona Norte, Sabaneta, Colombia	
5	Win	5–0	Robinson Florez	TKO	2 (8), 0:12	22 Oct 2021	Coliseo Sugar Baby Rojas, Barranquilla, Colombia	
4	Win	4–0	Hector Rolando Gusman	KO	1 (6), 0:52	27 Mar 2021	Club Atletico Lanus, Lanus, Argentina	
3	Win	3–0	Franco Facundo Huanque	KO	4 (6)	20 Feb 2021	Club Talleres, Arroyo Seco, Argentina	
2	Win	2–0	Jayvonne O'Neal	KO	1 (4), 1:29	12 Dec 2020	Jamil Shrine Temple, Columbia, South Carolina, U.S.	
1	Win	1–0	Akihiro Nakamura	KO	1 (4), 0:53	7 Nov 2020	Sports Event Center, Rock Hill, South Carolina, U.S.	

== See also ==
- List of male boxers

Sporting positions
Regional boxing titles
Vacant Title last held by Jordan Gill	WBA International featherweight champion 23 June 2022 – 8 August 2025; Won world title	Vacant
Vacant Title last held by Mayco Ezequiel Estadella	South American featherweight champion 3 September 2022 – 2024; Vacated	Vacant Title next held by Braian Ariel Arguello
World boxing titles
Vacant Title last held by Michael Conlan	WBA featherweight champion Interim title 8 August 2025 – present	Incumbent
