= Brandon Figueroa =

American boxer (born 1996)

Personal information
- Nickname: The Heartbreaker
- Born: December 29, 1996 (age 29) Weslaco, Texas, U.S.
- Height: 5 ft 9 in (175 cm)
- Weight: Super bantamweight; Featherweight

Boxing career
- Reach: 72 1/2 in (184 cm)
- Stance: Orthodox

Boxing record
- Total fights: 30
- Wins: 27
- Win by KO: 20
- Losses: 2
- Draws: 1

Brandon Lee Figueroa (born December 29, 1996) is an American professional boxer. He has won world championships in two weight classes from super bantamweight and featherweight.

== Early life ==
Brandon was born in Weslaco, Texas, to Mexican parents from Tamaulipas, Mexico, and is the younger brother of former WBC Lightweight champion Omar Figueroa.

== Professional career ==
=== Super bantamweight ===
==== WBA interim champion ====
Figueroa made his professional debut against Hector Gutierrez on May 9, 2015. He won the fight by unanimous decision. He amassed an 18–0 record over the next four years, with 13 stoppage victories. Figueroa was scheduled to face Yonfrez Parejo for the vacant WBA interim super bantamweight title on April 20, 2019, at the Dignity Health Sports Park in Carson, California. He was seen as a massive favorite heading into the bout, and was accordingly set as a –2879 betting favorite, while Parejo entered as a +1379 betting underdog. Figueroa won the fight by an eight-round stoppage. Although the first four rounds were even, Figueroa began to take over from the fifth round onward, forcing Parejo to retire from the fight after the eight round.

==== WBA regular champion ====
Figueroa was scheduled to defend his WBA Regular super bantamweight title against Julio Ceja on the undercard of the Deontay Wilder vs. Luis Ortiz II fight. The bout was scheduled for November 23, 2019, at the MGM Grand Garden Arena in Paradise, Nevada. Ceja came in 4.5 lbs over the 122 lbs weight limit, meaning the title was only on the line for Figueroa. The fight was ruled a split decision draw after twelve rounds, with one judge scoring it 116–112 for Ceja, the second 115–113 for Figueroa, while the third judge scored the fight as a 114–114 draw.

Figueroa was scheduled to make his second WBA title defense against Damien Vazquez on the undercard of The Charlos vs. Derevyanchenko and Rosario. The card was scheduled for September 26, 2020 at the Mohegan Sun Arena in Montville, Connecticut. Figueroa was seen as a massive favorite heading into the bout, with one media outlet describing it as "...a tune up fight for Figueroa". Figueroa won the fight by a tenth-round technical knockout.

==== Figueroa vs. Nery ====
Figueroa was scheduled to make the second defense of his WBA (Regular) title in a title unification bout against the reigning WBC super bantamweight champion Luis Nery. Following a four-month negotiation period, the fight was scheduled for May 15, 2021 at the Dignity Health Sports Park in Carson, California, United States. Nery was seen as a favorite to beat Figueroa, with opening odds seeing Nery as a –400 favorite and Figueroa at +275, although the line later saw Nery drop to –225 and Figueroa rise to +175. Figueroa won the fight by seventh round KO. Nery started bright and was dominating the fight, but Figueroa managed to drop Nery in the seventh round. As Nery was getting up from the canvas, referee Thomas Taylor decided to wave the fight off. The fight was officially stopped at the 2:18 minute mark of the 7th round.

==== Figueroa vs. Fulton ====
Figueroa faced the reigning WBO super bantamweight titleholder Stephen Fulton in a title unification bout. The fight was scheduled for September 11, 2021, before being postponed a week in order to replace the Canelo Alvarez and Caleb Plant fight as the main event of the September 18 PBC card. The fight was postponed for a second time on September 8, as Figueroa tested positive for COVID-19. The bout was rescheduled for November 27, 2021. Figueroa entered the bout as a +265 underdog. Figueroa lost a somewhat controversial majority 12 round decision, with votes of 114–114 and two 112–116 against him.

=== Featherweight ===
==== Figueroa vs. Castro ====
Figueroa was booked to face the fifth ranked WBC featherweight contender Carlos Castro in a featherweight title eliminator on July 9, 2022, at the Alamodome in San Antonio, Texas. The fight was scheduled as the co-feature to the WBC featherweight title clash between the champion Mark Magsayo and title challenger Rey Vargas. Figueroa won the fight by a controversial sixth-round technical knockout. He was up on the scorecards at the time of the stoppage, with two judges having scored the fight 49–45 and 48–46 in his favor, while the third judge had the fight 48–46 for Castro. Figueroa knocked Castro down once prior the stoppage, with a left in the third round.

==== Figueroa vs. Magsayo ====
An interim WBC featherweight title bout between Figueroa and Stephen Fulton was approved by the sanctioning body on November 9, 2022, as the current featherweight titlist Rey Vargas was given a one-fight exemption to move up in weight and contest the vacant super featherweight belt. The fight was a rematch of their November 27, 2021, bout, which Fulton won by majority decision. The fight was expected to take place on February 25, 2023, at the Minneapolis Armory in Central, Minneapolis. On January 16, 2023, it was revealed that Figueroa was instead finalizing a deal with the former WBC featherweight champion Mark Magsayo, as Fulton had entered into negotiations with the former three-division world champion Naoya Inoue. Figueroa faced Magsayo on March 4, 2023, at the Toyota Arena in Ontario, California. He won the fight by unanimous decision. Judges Gary Ritter and Fernando Villarreal scored the bout 117–110 in his favor, while judge Zachary Young awarded him a wider 118–110 scorecard. Magsayo was deducted a point apiece in rounds eight and eleven for excessive holding.

==== Figueroa vs. Magdaleno ====
On May 4, 2024 in Las Vegas, Figueroa was scheduled to make the first defense of his interim WBC featherweight title against Jessie Magdaleno. He won the fight by knockout in the ninth round with a left body shot.

==== Figueroa vs. Fulton II ====
On October 10, 2024 it was announced that Figueroa would face Stephen Fulton on December 14, 2024 at Toyota Center in Houston, TX. In November 2024 it was reported that the fight was scheduled to take place on February 1, 2025 at T-Mobile Arena in Las Vegas. In the rematch, he lost the fight and his WBC featherweight title via unanimous decision with a scorecard of 116-112, 116-112 and 117-111 by the judges, in favor of Fulton.

==== Figueroa vs. Ball ====
Figueroa was scheduled to challenge Nick Ball for his WBA featherweight title in Liverpool, England, on February 7, 2026. Figueroa won the bout in the 12th round by TKO to become WBA featherweight champion.

==== Cancelled bout vs. Kameda ====
Figueroa was scheduled to make his first WBA featherweight title defense against Tomoki Kameda on 17 October 2026, at the Cosmopolitan of Las Vegas in Nevada, United States. At the weigh-ins, Figueroa weighed in at 127.4 lb (58 kg), 1.4 lb (1 kg) over the title limit. As a result, Figueroa was stripped of the title and only Kameda would have been eligible to win it. The bout was subsequently cancelled after Figueroa withdrew from the event due to illness.

== Personal life ==
On October 2, 2022, Figueroa was arrested for driving under the influence, after his BAC test came back at 0.15%, significantly over the permitted state limit of 0.08%.

== Professional boxing record ==
30 fights	27 wins	2 losses
By knockout	20	0
By decision	7	2
Draws	1	

No.	Result	Record	Opponent	Type	Round, time	Date	Location	Notes
30	Win	27–2–1	Nick Ball	TKO	12 (12), 0:32	Feb 7, 2026	M&S Bank Arena, Liverpool, England	Won WBA featherweight title. Later stripped of the title after missing weight (127.4 lb).
29	Win	26–2–1	Joet Gonzalez	UD	12	Jul 19, 2025	MGM Grand Garden Arena, Paradise, Nevada, U.S.	
28	Loss	25–2–1	Stephen Fulton	UD	12	Feb 1, 2025	T-Mobile Arena, Paradise, Nevada, U.S.	Lost WBC featherweight title
27	Win	25–1–1	Jessie Magdaleno	KO	9 (12), 2:59	May 4, 2024	T-Mobile Arena, Paradise, Nevada, U.S.	Retained WBC interim featherweight title
26	Win	24–1–1	Mark Magsayo	UD	12	Mar 4, 2023	Toyota Arena, Ontario, California, U.S.	Won vacant WBC interim featherweight title
25	Win	23–1–1	Carlos Castro	TKO	6 (12), 2:11	Jul 9, 2022	Alamodome, San Antonio, Texas, U.S.	
24	Loss	22–1–1	Stephen Fulton	MD	12	Nov 27, 2021	Park MGM, Paradise, Nevada, U.S.	Lost WBC super bantamweight title; For WBO super bantamweight title
23	Win	22–0–1	Luis Nery	KO	7 (12), 2:18	May 15, 2021	Dignity Health Sports Park, Carson, California, U.S.	Retained WBA (Regular) super bantamweight title; Won WBC super bantamweight title
22	Win	21–0–1	Damien Vazquez	TKO	10 (12), 1:18	Sep 26, 2020	Mohegan Sun Arena, Montville, Connecticut, U.S.	Retained WBA (Regular) super bantamweight title
21	Draw	20–0–1	Julio Ceja	SD	12	Nov 23, 2019	MGM Grand Garden Arena, Paradise, Nevada, U.S.	Retained WBA (Regular) super bantamweight title
20	Win	20–0	Javier Nicolas Chacon	KO	4 (12), 0:55	Aug 24, 2019	Bert Ogden Arena, Edinburg, Texas, U.S.	Retained WBA interim super bantamweight title
19	Win	19–0	Yonfrez Parejo	RTD	8 (12), 3:00	Apr 20, 2019	Dignity Health Sports Park, Carson, California, U.S.	Won vacant WBA interim super bantamweight title
18	Win	18–0	Moises Flores	KO	3 (12), 1:45	Jan 13, 2019	Microsoft Theater, Los Angeles, California, U.S.	
17	Win	17–0	Óscar Escandón	KO	10 (10), 2:11	Sep 30, 2018	Toyota Arena, Ontario, California, U.S.	
16	Win	16–0	Luis Roy Suarez Cruz	TKO	1 (8), 2:57	Aug 4, 2018	Nassau Coliseum, Uniondale, New York, U.S.	
15	Win	15–0	Giovanni Delgado	TKO	7 (8), 0:45	Mar 10, 2018	Freeman Coliseum, San Antonio, Texas, U.S.	
14	Win	14–0	Victor Proa	TKO	4 (8), 1:15	Oct 14, 2017	Livestock Showground, Mercedes, Texas, U.S.	
13	Win	13–0	Fatiou Fassinou	UD	8	Jul 15, 2017	Nassau Coliseum, Uniondale, New York, U.S.	
12	Win	12–0	Luis Fernando Saavedra	UD	8	May 2, 2017	Sportsmen's Lodge, Los Angeles, California, U.S.	
11	Win	11–0	Raul Chirino	TKO	4 (6), 2:54	Feb 21, 2017	Silver Street Studios, Houston, Texas, U.S.	
10	Win	10–0	Raymond Chacon	UD	6	Oct 8, 2016	Sports Arena, Brownsville, Texas, U.S.	
9	Win	9–0	Adalberto Zorrilla	KO	3 (6), 1:20	Jul 23, 2016	Scottish Rite Theatre, San Antonio, Texas, U.S.	
8	Win	8–0	Oldier Landin	TKO	2 (6), 2:45	Jun 25, 2016	Scottish Rite Theatre, San Antonio, Texas, U.S.	
7	Win	7–0	Jonell Nieves	TKO	5 (6), 1:31	May 28, 2016	Cowboys Dance Hall, San Antonio, Texas, U.S.	
6	Win	6–0	Jahaziel Vazquez	TKO	2 (4), 0:30	Apr 23, 2016	Pharr Events Center, Pharr, Texas, U.S.	
5	Win	5–0	Harold Reyes	TKO	6 (6), 2:25	Jan 12, 2016	Cowboys Dance Hall, San Antonio, Texas, U.S.	
4	Win	4–0	Francisco Muro	UD	4	Dec 12, 2015	AT&T Center, San Antonio, Texas, U.S.	
3	Win	3–0	Ramiro Ruiz	TKO	4 (4), 1:17	Oct 10, 2015	Pharr Events Center, Pharr, Texas, U.S.	
2	Win	2–0	Ricardo Mena	TKO	1 (4), 0:51	Jun 26, 2015	State Farm Arena, Hidalgo, Texas, U.S.	
1	Win	1–0	Hector Gutierrez	UD	4	May 9, 2015	State Farm Arena, Hidalgo, Texas, U.S.	

== Titles in boxing ==
=== Major world titles ===
- WBC super bantamweight champion (122 lbs)
- WBC featherweight champion (126 lbs)
- WBA featherweight champion (126 lbs)

=== Secondary major world titles (Note: The secondary champion lineage lists the Regular or Unified champions while the primary champion is occupied.) ===
- WBA (Regular) super bantamweight champion (122 lbs)

=== Interim world titles ===
- WBA interim super bantamweight champion (122 lbs)
- WBC interim featherweight champion (126 lbs)

== See also ==
- List of male boxers
- Notable boxing families
- List of Mexican boxing world champions
- List of world super-bantamweight boxing champions
- List of world featherweight boxing champions

== Notes ==
Sporting positions
World boxing titles
Vacant Title last held by Moises Flores	WBA super bantamweight champion Interim title April 20 – October 31, 2019; Promoted	Vacant Title next held by Ra'eese Aleem
Vacant Title last held by Daniel Roman	WBA super bantamweight champion Regular title October 31, 2019 – November 27, 2021; Stripped	Title discontinued
Preceded by Luis Nery	WBC super bantamweight champion May 15 – November 27, 2021	Succeeded by Stephen Fulton
Vacant Title last held by Óscar Escandón	WBC featherweight champion Interim title March 4, 2023 – October 18, 2024; Promoted	Vacant Title next held by Bruce Carrington
Preceded by Rey Vargas; Status changed	WBC featherweight champion October 18, 2024 – February 1, 2025	Succeeded by Stephen Fulton
Preceded by Nick Ball	WBA featherweight champion February 7 – September 16, 2026; Stripped	Vacant
