= Stephen Fulton (boxer) =

American boxer (born 1994)

Stephen Fulton Jr.
- Fulton in 2025

Personal information
- Nicknames: Scooter; Cool Boy Steph
- Born: July 17, 1994 (age 32) Philadelphia, Pennsylvania, U.S.
- Height: 5 ft 6 1/2 in (169 cm)
- Weight: Super bantamweight; Featherweight; Super featherweight; Lightweight

Boxing career
- Reach: 70 1/2 in (179 cm)
- Stance: Orthodox

Boxing record
- Total fights: 25
- Wins: 23
- Win by KO: 8
- Losses: 2
Medal record
Men's Amateur boxing
Representing United States
Golden Gloves
Gold medal – first place	2013 Salt Lake City	Super bantamweight

Stephen Fulton Jr. (born July 17, 1994) is an American professional boxer. He has held world championships in two weight classes having held the unified World Boxing Council (WBC) and World Boxing Organization (WBO) super bantamweight titles from 2021 to 2023, and the WBC featherweight title in 2025.

== Professional career ==
=== Early career ===
Fulton made his professional debut against the journeyman Issac Badger on October 14, 2014. He won the fight by a second-round technical knockout. Immediately after this victory, Fulton signed with Premier Boxing Champions. Over the course of the following five years, Fulton amassed a 15–0 record with 6 stoppage victories.

=== IBO super bantamweight champion ===
==== Fulton vs. Ambunda ====
Fulton was scheduled to challenge former WBO bantamweight champion and current IBO super bantamweight champion Paulus Ambunda on May 11, 2019, at the EagleBank Arena in Fairfax, Virginia, United States. Fulton dominated throughout the bout and scored a knockdown over the Namibian champion in the eight round. Although Fulton was unable to finish his opponent, he won the fight by a wide unanimous decision, with all three judges scoring the fight 120–107 in his favor.

==== Fulton vs. Avelar ====
Fulton moved up in weight for his next fight, as he was scheduled to face Isaac Avelar in a 124 lbs catchweight bout. The fight was set for August 24, 2019, at the Bert Ogden Arena in Edinburg, Texas, United States. Fulton won the fight with a body shot in the sixth round of the ten round bout. Fulton called for a title unification fight with either Brandon Figueroa or Daniel Roman in his post-fight interview, stating "...Figueroa does not want to fight me and if he does, he will get stopped in the mid rounds. If me and Danny Roman fight, it will be explosive but the same thing will happen, he will get stopped".

=== WBO super bantamweight champion ===
==== Fulton vs. Khegai ====
Fulton was scheduled to face the unbeaten Arnold Khegai on January 25, 2020 at the Barclays Center in New York City, United States. The fight was for the vacant WBO Inter-Continental super bantamweight belt, as well as the status of the WBO super bantamweight mandatory title challenger. Khegai took the center of the ring for the first four rounds, while Fulton remained passive and attempted to outfight. Fulton was more active from the fifth round onward, dictating the subsequent rounds. He won the fight by unanimous decision, with two judges awarding him a 117–111 scorecard, while the third judge scored the fight 116–112 in his favor.

==== Fulton vs. Leo ====
His victory against Khegai earned Fulton the right to challenge the reigning WBO champion Emanuel Navarrete. However, on July 11, 2020, Navarrete vacated the super bantamweight title in order to move up to featherweight. Fulton was scheduled to face Angelo Leo for the vacant WBO super bantamweight title on August 1, 2020. On July 29, 2020, Fulton and two members of his team tested positive for COVID-19, forcing him to withdraw from the title fight. Leo was rescheduled to face Tramaine Williams, whom he beat by unanimous decision. On December 20, 2020, it was announced that Angelo Leo would make the first defense of his WBO super bantamweight title against Fulton. The fight was scheduled as the main event of a triple-header set for January 23, 2021, at the Park Theater in Las Vegas, Nevada, United States. Leo appeared slower and less powerful than Fulton, who won almost every round of the bout. Fulton won the fight by unanimous decision, with scores of 118–110, 119–109 and 119–109.

=== Unified super bantamweight champion ===
==== Fulton vs. Figueroa ====
Fulton was scheduled to face the WBC super bantamweight titlist Brandon Figueroa in a title unification bout on September 18, 2021, at the Park Theater in Las Vegas, Nevada, United States. The fight was originally set for September 11, but was pushed back a week, as PBC required a new main event following the negotiation breakdown between Canelo Alvarez and Caleb Plant. The fight was once again postponed on September 8, as Figueroa tested positive for COVID-19. The fight was rescheduled for November 27, 2021. Fulton entered the bout as a -340 favorite to win the bout. Fulton won by twelve rounds majority decision, with scores of 114-114 and two 116-112's for him. Figueroa out-landed Fulton 314 to 269 in total punches, although Fulton was the more accurate boxer, landing 37% of his punches to Figueroa's 29.6%. The majority of media members scored the fight in Fulton's favor.

==== Fulton vs. Roman ====
It was revealed on March 6, 2022, that Fulton would make his first title defense as a unified champion against former unified champion Daniel Roman, who was at the time the WBC mandatory super bantamweight title challenger, as well as the No. 1 ranked WBO super bantamweight contender. Fulton's first title defense as a unified champion headlined a Showtime broadcast card, which took place on 4 June 2022, at the Minneapolis Armory in Minneapolis, Minnesota. Fulton justified his role as the -550 betting favorite, as he won the fight by a wide unanimous decision in front of a sold-out crowd of 4,695. Judges Mike Fitzgerald and Patrick Morley scored the fight 120–108 for Fulton, while judge Nathan Palmer awarded Fulton a 119–109 scorecard. He out-landed Roman 218 to 113 in total punches (with a 36% accuracy rate) and 112 to 68 in power punches (with a 46% accuracy rate). Fulton called out the WBA (Super) and IBF super bantamweight champion Murodjon Akhmadaliev in his post-fight interview, stating: "You already know what’s next. I want [Murodjon Akhmadaliev]. I got to finish this up".

==== Fulton vs. Inoue ====
On November 9, 2022, the WBC formally approved Fulton's petition to face Brandon Figueroa for the interim WBC featherweight championship. As the reigning featherweight champion Rey Vargas moved up in weight to contest the vacant super featherweight title, the interim title fight would have been promoted to undisputed, had Vargas stayed at a higher weight class. Fulton and Figueroa faced each other a year prior in a unified title bout, with Fulton winning by majority decision. The fight was expected to take place on February 25, 2023, at the Minneapolis Armory in Central, Minneapolis. On January 16, ESPN reported that Figueroa would instead face Mark Magsayo, as Fulton had entered into negotiations with the former three-division world champion Naoya Inoue. The fight was expected to take place at the Yokohama Arena in Yokohama, Japan on May 7, 2023, and was Fulton's first fight outside of the United States. The fight was postponed on March 21, as Inoue suffered a fist injury during training camp. The bout was rescheduled for July 25, 2023, at the Ariake Arena in Tokyo, Japan. Fulton lost the fight by an eighth-round technical knockout.

=== Move to featherweight ===
==== Fulton vs. Castro ====
Fulton was scheduled to face Carlos Castro in a 10-round featherweight bout at T-Mobile Arena in Las Vegas on September 14, 2024. He won the fight by split decision.

=== WBC featherweight champion ===
==== Fulton vs. Figueroa II ====
On October 10, 2024 it was announced that Fulton would face the current WBC featherweight champion Brandon Figueroa at Toyota Center in Houston, TX on December 14, 2024. In November 2024 it was reported that the bout was scheduled to take place at T-Mobile Arena in Las Vegas on February 1, 2025. Fulton won the fight by unanimous decision.

=== WBC super featherweight championship ===
==== Fulton vs. Foster ====
In late August 2025, it was reported that Fulton would move up a weight class to challenge O'Shaquie Foster for his WBC super featherweight title at MGM Grand Garden Arena in Las Vegas on October 25, 2025. However, because Fulton weighed in two pounds over the super featherweight limit at 132lbs, the bout was changed to the WBC interim lightweight championship title fight. Fulton lost the fight by unanimous decision.

== Professional boxing record ==
25 fights	23 wins	2 losses
By knockout	8	1
By decision	15	1

No.	Result	Record	Opponent	Type	Round, time	Date	Location	Notes
25	Loss	23–2	O'Shaquie Foster	UD	12	Dec 6, 2025	Frost Bank Center, San Antonio, Texas, U.S.	For vacant WBC interim lightweight title
24	Win	23–1	Brandon Figueroa	UD	12	Feb 1, 2025	T-Mobile Arena, Paradise, Nevada, U.S.	Won WBC featherweight title
23	Win	22–1	Carlos Castro	SD	10	Sep 14, 2024	T-Mobile Arena, Paradise, Nevada, U.S.	
22	Loss	21–1	Naoya Inoue	TKO	8 (12), 1:14	Jul 25, 2023	Ariake Arena, Tokyo, Japan	Lost WBC and WBO super bantamweight titles
21	Win	21–0	Daniel Roman	UD	12	Jun 4, 2022	Minneapolis Armory, Minneapolis, Minnesota, U.S.	Retained WBC and WBO super bantamweight titles
20	Win	20–0	Brandon Figueroa	MD	12	Nov 27, 2021	Park MGM, Paradise, Nevada, U.S.	Retained WBO super bantamweight title; Won WBC super bantamweight title
19	Win	19–0	Angelo Leo	UD	12	Jan 23, 2021	Mohegan Sun Arena, Montville, Connecticut, U.S.	Won WBO super bantamweight title
18	Win	18–0	Arnold Khegai	UD	12	Jan 25, 2020	Barclays Center, New York City, New York, U.S.	Won vacant WBO Inter-Continental super bantamweight title
17	Win	17–0	Isaac Avelar	KO	6 (10), 1:26	Aug 24, 2019	Bert Ogden Arena, Edinburg, Texas, U.S.	
16	Win	16–0	Paulus Ambunda	UD	12	May 11, 2019	EagleBank Arena, Fairfax, Virginia, U.S.	Won IBO super bantamweight title
15	Win	15–0	Marlon Olea	TKO	5 (8), 1:41	Jan 26, 2019	Barclays Center, New York City, New York, U.S.	
14	Win	14–0	Germán Meraz	UD	8	Sep 30, 2018	Citizens Business Bank Arena, Ontario, California, U.S.	
13	Win	13–0	Jesus Antonio Ahumada	TKO	9 (10), 1:54	Jun 16, 2018	Ford Center at The Star, Frisco, Texas, U.S.	
12	Win	12–0	Adam Lopez	MD	8	Dec 8, 2017	Park Racing & Casino, Hialeah, Florida, U.S.	
11	Win	11–0	Luis Saul Rosario	UD	8	Apr 4, 2017	Sands Event Center, Bethlehem, Pennsylvania, U.S.	
10	Win	10–0	Christian Renteria	TKO	3 (6), 1:38	Jul 2, 2016	Santander Arena, Reading, Pennsylvania, U.S.	
9	Win	9–0	Adalberto Zorrilla DelRosa	TKO	4 (6), 1:37	Apr 19, 2016	Sands Event Center, Bethlehem, Pennsylvania, U.S.	
8	Win	8–0	Joshua Greer Jr.	MD	6	Dec 29, 2015	Sands Event Center, Bethlehem, Pennsylvania, U.S.	
7	Win	7–0	Sam Rodriguez	UD	6	Sep 19, 2015	Convocation Center, California, Pennsylvania, U.S.	
6	Win	6–0	Pablo Cupul	RTD	3 (6), 3:00	Jun 20, 2015	Casino Resort, Valley Forge, Pennsylvania, U.S.	
5	Win	5–0	Jamal Parram	KO	3 (6), 1:33	Apr 25, 2015	Harrah's Philadelphia, Chester, Pennsylvania, U.S.	
4	Win	4–0	Eric Gotay	UD	6	Jan 31, 2015	2300 Arena, Philadelphia, Pennsylvania, U.S.	
3	Win	3–0	Benjamin Burgos	UD	4	Dec 5, 2014	Harrah's Philadelphia, Chester, Pennsylvania, U.S.	
2	Win	2–0	Damen Wood	UD	4	Nov 20, 2014	Sportsmen's Lodge, Studio City, California, U.S.	
1	Win	1–0	Issac Badger	TKO	2 (4)	Oct 14, 2014	Foxwoods Resort Casino, Ledyard, Connecticut, U.S.	

== Titles in boxing ==
=== Major world titles ===
- WBC super bantamweight champion (122 lbs)
- WBO super bantamweight champion (122 lbs)
- WBC featherweight champion (126 lbs)

=== Minor world titles ===
- IBO super bantamweight champion (122 lbs)

== See also ==
- List of male boxers
- List of world super-bantamweight boxing champions
- List of world featherweight boxing champions

Sporting positions
Amateur boxing titles
Previous: Shawn Simpson	Golden Gloves flyweight champion 2013	Next: Antonio Vargas
Regional boxing titles
Vacant Title last held by Albert Pagara	WBO Inter-Continental super bantamweight champion January 25, 2020 – January 23, 2021; Won world title	Vacant Title next held by Michael Conlan
Minor world boxing titles
Preceded by Paulus Ambunda	IBO super bantamweight champion May 11, 2019 – 2020; Vacated	Vacant Title next held by Ludumo Lamati
Major world boxing titles
Preceded by Angelo Leo	WBO super bantamweight champion January 23, 2021 – July 25, 2023	Succeeded by Naoya Inoue
Preceded by Brandon Figueroa	WBC super bantamweight champion November 27, 2021 – July 25, 2023	Succeeded by Naoya Inoue
Preceded by Brandon Figueroa	WBC featherweight champion February 1 – December 12, 2025	Vacant Title next held by Bruce Carrington
