= Mario Barrios =

Mexican-American boxer (born 1995)

Personal information
- Nicknames: El Azteca; El Niño Dorado; Golden Boy
- Born: Mario Thomas Barrios; May 18, 1995 (age 31) San Antonio, Texas, U.S.
- Height: 6 ft 0 in (183 cm)
- Weight: Light welterweight; Welterweight

Boxing career
- Reach: 74 in (188 cm)
- Stance: Orthodox

Boxing record
- Total fights: 34
- Wins: 29
- Win by KO: 18
- Losses: 3
- Draws: 2

Mario Thomas Barrios (born May 18, 1995) is a Mexican-American professional boxer. He held the World Boxing Association (WBA) (Regular version) super lightweight title from 2019 to 2021 and the World Boxing Council (WBC) welterweight title from 2024 to 2026.

== Professional career ==
Barrios turned professional in 2013.

=== Barrios vs. Velasco ===
On May 11, 2019, Barrios faced Juan Jose Velasco. Barrios got the KO win via a body shot in the second round.

=== WBA (Regular) super-lightweight champion ===
==== Barrios vs. Akhmedov ====
On September 28, 2019, Barrios was victorious against undefeated Batyr Akhmedov by unanimous decision, with scores of 114–112, 115–111, 116–111, to win the vacant WBA (Regular) super lightweight title in a tough contest on the undercard of Errol Spence Jr. vs. Shawn Porter, in which Barrios dropped Akhmedov twice in the fourth and twelfth rounds but took considerable punishment resulting in most of his face being swollen. The decision was considered controversial by many pundits and observers.

==== Barrios vs. Karl ====
On October 31, 2020, in front of a crowd at Alamodrome in San Antonio, Texas on the undercard of Gervonta Davis vs. Léo Santa Cruz, Barrios defended his WBA (Regular) title with a sixth-round technical knockout victory against Ryan Karl. In the sixth round, an accidental head clash caused a bad cut over Karl’s right eye, and blood poured down his face. After the cut was examined by the ringside doctor, the fight resumed and the two men immediately went hard after each other, until Barrios dropped Karl with a pair of left hooks to the chin during a fierce exchange. As soon as Karl went down, the referee called off the fight at 2 minutes, 23 seconds. At the time of the stoppage, Barrios led 48–47, 49–46, 49–46 on the judges' scorecards.

==== Barrios vs. Davis ====
Barrios faced fellow undefeated Gervonta Davis on Showtime PPV on June 26, 2021, at the State Farm Arena in Atlanta. Davis knocked Barrios down twice in the eighth round, and again in the eleventh round en route to an eleventh-round technical knockout victory, handing Barrios his first professional loss. At the time of the stoppage, Barrios was down 97–91 and 96–92 twice on the judges' scorecards.

=== Welterweight ===
==== Barrios vs. Thurman ====
After the loss to Davis, Barrios decided to move up a weight-class and challenge the former-unified (WBA and WBC) welterweight champion Keith "One Time" Thurman, who, like him, was coming off a loss.

Their bout took place at the Michelob Ultra Arena in Las Vegas on 5 February 2022, with their fight also serving as a WBC welterweight world title eliminator.

And after 12 rounds of boxing, Barrios lost a clear unanimous decision with scores of 117–111 and two scores of 118–110.

==== Barrios vs. Santiago ====
A year after the second consecutive defeat of his professional boxing career, Barrios then faced Puerto Rican Jovanie "El Lobito" Santiago in a welterweight under-card fight for the O'Shaquie "Ice Water Shock" Foster vs Rey Vargas pay-per-view bout on 11 February 2023, at Alamodome, San Antonio, Texas, U.S.

The fight with Santiago was also for the then-vacant WBC Continental Americas welterweight title.

After seven tough-fought rounds that saw both fighters unwilling to give the other the upper hand, in the eighth round, Barrios landed a wicked left hook to Santiago's liver that crumpled the Puerto Rican on the ropes.

Santiago managed to bravely beat the 10-count and got back up on his feet, but, with blood in smelt in the air, Barrios bull-rushed his obviously still-hurting opponent and began landing a barrage of combinations on him.

Seeing enough, Santiago's corner threw in the towel which prompted referee Mark Calo-Oy to stop the fight at 1:42 of the 8th round and thus making Barrios the victor of their fight by way of technical-knock-out and the new holder of the WBC Continental Americas welterweight title.

=== WBC interim welterweight champion ===
==== Barrios vs. Ugás ====
Seven months and a half after his victory over Santiago, Barrios clashed with former WBA (Super) welterweight title holder Yordenis "54 Milagros" Ugás for the then-vacant Interim WBC welterweight title. With their fight also serving as an under-card fight for the Saul "Canelo" Alvarez vs. Jermell "Iron Man" Charlo pay-per-view bout on 30 September 2023, at T-Mobile Arena, Paradise, Nevada, U.S.

Much to the surprise of many, however, the odds were proven wrong on fight-night itself with Barrios battering and even dropping Ugás twice—once in the second round and once again in the twelfth—en route to a unanimous decision victory over the Cuban with scores of 118–107 twice and 117–108 all in his favor. What's more, back in the 12th and final round of their fight, Ugás was deducted a point for intentionally spitting out his mouth piece—which is illegal—twice so that referee Thomas Taylor would pause the fight and buy him some time to recuperate.

And with the upset-win, Barrios became the WBC Interim Champion of the welterweight division.

==== Barrios vs. Maidana ====
On the 4th of May, 2024, at the T-Mobile Arena in Paradise, Nevada, Barrios would go on to make the first defense of his WBC (Interim) Welterweight Title against Argentina's own heavy-handed Fabian "TNT" Maidana. Their fight also served as the Co-Main event of the Saul "Canelo" Alvarez vs Jaime Munguia pay-per-view bout. After dropping his opponent in the 3rd round, fighting through a swollen right eye, and hunting down a tentatively defense-minded Maidana in the later rounds, Barrios won the fight by way of unanimous decision, with all three judges scoring the bout 116–111.

=== WBC welterweight champion ===
On the 27th of May, 2024, the WBC officially demoted Terence Crawford from being their welterweight champion to their welterweight "champion in recess" due to the uncertainty of him ever coming back down to the welterweight division after his fight with Israil Madrimov for the WBA super welterweight and the WBO interim super welterweight titles.

22 days thereafter, on the 18th of June, 2024, the WBC and its Board of Governors voted to elevate their welterweight interim champion, Mario Barrios, to full-fledged champion. Barrios was now formally recognized as WBC welterweight champion.

==== Barrios vs. Ramos ====
Barrios made the first defense of his WBC welterweight title against the hardhitting and WBC 8th ranked (as of the 21st of October, 2024) 33-year-old Mexican-American veteran Abel Ramos on the Jake Paul vs. Mike Tyson undercard at AT&T Stadium in Arlington, TX on November 15, 2024.

In the opening round of their scheduled twelve-round bout, Barrios rocked Ramos with a straight right hand that made him squat deep into the canvas. From a distance, it seemed Ramos' right glove touched the canvas, but referee Hector Afu made the decision not to count that as a knockdown. Then in the following round, Barrios knocked down Ramos clean with a lead left hook and a straight right hand to his chin.

From the 3rd to the 5th round, El Azteca greatly utilized his greater reach and kept Ramos mostly at bay with jabs and educated 1-2 combinations. However, in the 6th, the underdog Ramos would switch the tide on the defending champion by knocking him down with an overhand right. It almost seemed as if Ramos was on his way to knocking out Barrios, but the defending champion managed to survive the remainder of the round.

Then from the 7th to the 9th round, Ramos, energized by his successful knockdown on Barrios, began to push the fight more and land more power shots. From the 10th onward, Barrios, with his nose busted and his left eye swelling a little, regained his composure and returned to maximizing his superior range and bombarding Ramos with jabs and power shots from a distance.

The last seconds of the 12th saw the WBC champion throw a myriad of combinations on Ramos and made him stagger back before the final bell rang.

After the conclusion of 12 brutal rounds of action, the official scorecards read 114–112 for Ramos, 116–110 for Barrios, and 113–113 even for a split draw decision, with Barrios retaining his belt and championship status.

==== Barrios vs. Pacquiao ====
In May 2025, it was announced that former eight division world champion Manny Pacquiao would end his nearly four-year retirement with a return bout against Barrios for the WBC welterweight championship on July 19 in Las Vegas.

On July 19, 2025, the bout between Pacquiao and Barrios ended in a majority draw after 12 competitive rounds. One judge scored the contest 115–113 for Barrios, while the other two judges scored it 114–114, allowing Barrios to retain the WBC welterweight title.

==== Barrios vs. Garcia ====
Barrios faced Ryan Garcia for Barrios’s WBC World Welterweight Championship at T-Mobile Arena in Las Vegas, on February 21, 2026. The DAZN pay-per-view was billed as "The Ring: High Stakes", which pitted Garcia against his former trainer, Joe Goossen, who is now training Barrios. Garcia started the fight, dropping Barrios from an overhand right in the First Round. Garcia continued to dominate the fight winning by 12 round Unanimous Decision with the judges having it 120 - 107, 119 - 108, 118 - 109, all for Garcia.

== Professional boxing record ==
34 fights	29 wins	3 losses
By knockout	18	1
By decision	11	2
Draws	2	

No.	Result	Record	Opponent	Type	Round, time	Date	Location	Notes
34	Loss	29–3–2	Ryan Garcia	UD	12	Feb 21, 2026	T-Mobile Arena, Paradise, Nevada U.S.	Lost WBC welterweight title
33	Draw	29–2–2	Manny Pacquiao	MD	12	Jul 19, 2025	MGM Grand Garden Arena, Paradise, Nevada U.S.	Retained WBC welterweight title
32	Draw	29–2–1	Abel Ramos	SD	12	Nov 15, 2024	AT&T Stadium, Arlington, Texas, U.S.	Retained WBC welterweight title
31	Win	29–2	Fabián Maidana	UD	12	May 4, 2024	T-Mobile Arena, Paradise, Nevada, U.S.	Retained WBC interim welterweight title
30	Win	28–2	Yordenis Ugás	UD	12	Sep 30, 2023	T-Mobile Arena, Paradise, Nevada, U.S.	Won vacant WBC interim welterweight title
29	Win	27–2	Jovanie Santiago	TKO	8 (10), 1:42	Feb 11, 2023	Alamodome, San Antonio, Texas, U.S.	Won vacant WBC Continental Americas welterweight title
28	Loss	26–2	Keith Thurman	UD	12	Feb 5, 2022	Michelob Ultra Arena, Paradise, Nevada, U.S.	
27	Loss	26–1	Gervonta Davis	TKO	11 (12), 2:13	Jun 26, 2021	State Farm Arena, Atlanta, Georgia, U.S.	Lost WBA (Regular) super lightweight title
26	Win	26–0	Ryan Karl	TKO	6 (12), 2:23	Oct 31, 2020	Alamodome, San Antonio, Texas, U.S.	Retained WBA (Regular) super lightweight title
25	Win	25–0	Batyr Akhmedov	UD	12	Sep 28, 2019	Staples Center, Los Angeles, California, U.S.	Won vacant WBA (Regular) super lightweight title
24	Win	24–0	Juan Jose Velasco	KO	2 (10), 1:16	May 11, 2019	EagleBank Arena, Fairfax, Virginia, U.S.	
23	Win	23–0	Richard Zamora	KO	4 (10), 2:16	Feb 9, 2019	Dignity Health Sports Park, Carson, California, U.S.	
22	Win	22–0	Jose Roman	RTD	8 (10), 3:00	Jul 28, 2018	Staples Center, Los Angeles, California, U.S.	Won vacant WBA Inter-Continental welterweight title
21	Win	21–0	Eudy Bernardo	TKO	2 (10), 0:45	Mar 10, 2018	Freeman Coliseum, San Antonio, Texas, U.S.	
20	Win	20–0	Naim Nelson	TKO	7 (10), 1:41	Sep 19, 2017	Wind Creek Event Center, Bethlehem, Pennsylvania, U.S.	
19	Win	19–0	Jose Luis Rodriguez	KO	7 (10), 0:37	Jun 11, 2017	Pioneer Event Center, Lancaster, California, U.S.	
18	Win	18–0	Yardley Armenta Cruz	TKO	6 (8), 0:25	Mar 4, 2017	Barclays Center, New York City, New York, U.S.	
17	Win	17–0	Claudio Rosendo Tapia	KO	2 (8), 2:36	Dec 10, 2016	Galen Center, Los Angeles, California, U.S.	
16	Win	16–0	Devis Boschiero	UD	12	Jul 9, 2016	CURE Insurance Arena, Trenton, New Jersey, U.S.	
15	Win	15–0	Edgar Gabejan	UD	8	Apr 16, 2016	Barclays Center, New York City, New York, U.S.	
14	Win	14–0	Manuel Vides	KO	6 (8), 0:31	Dec 12, 2015	AT&T Center, San Antonio, Texas, U.S.	
13	Win	13–0	Enrique Tinoco	UD	8	Nov 10, 2015	Music Hall, Austin, Texas, U.S.	
12	Win	12–0	Eduardo Rivera	KO	1 (8), 2:04	Sep 26, 2015	Legacy Arena, Birmingham, Alabama, U.S.	
11	Win	11–0	Jose Cen Torres	TKO	4 (8), 2:10	Sep 6, 2015	American Bank Center, Corpus Christi, Texas, U.S.	
10	Win	10–0	Jose Arturo Esquivel	UD	8	Jul 18, 2015	Don Haskins Center, El Paso, Texas, U.S.	
9	Win	9–0	Jose Del Valle	KO	6 (6), 1:02	May 9, 2015	Payne Arena, Hidalgo, Texas, U.S.	
8	Win	8–0	Justin Lopez	TKO	3 (6), 1:53	Mar 7, 2015	MGM Grand Garden Arena, Paradise, Nevada, U.S.	
7	Win	7–0	Juan Sandoval	UD	4	Nov 20, 2014	Sportsmen's Lodge, Los Angeles, California, U.S.	
6	Win	6–0	Abraham Rubio	KO	1 (4), 0:53	Oct 8, 2014	Beau Rivage Resort & Casino, Biloxi, Mississippi, U.S.	
5	Win	5–0	Salvador Perez	KO	1 (4), 2:18	Jul 25, 2014	Fantasy Springs Resort Casino, Indio, California, U.S.	
4	Win	4–0	Jaxel Marrero	UD	4	May 10, 2014	Galen Center, Los Angeles, California, U.S.	
3	Win	3–0	Lyonell Kelly	UD	4	Mar 7, 2014	Pala Casino Resort and Spa, Pala, California, U.S.	
2	Win	2–0	Manuel Rubalcava	UD	4	Feb 10, 2014	Cowboys Dance Hall, San Antonio, Texas, U.S.	
1	Win	1–0	Rigoberto Moreno	TKO	1 (4), 1:39	Nov 11, 2013	Cowboys Dance Hall, San Antonio, Texas, U.S.	

== Personal life ==
Mario's sister Selina Barrios is also a professional boxer.

== See also ==
- List of Mexican boxing world champions
- List of world light-welterweight boxing champions
- List of world welterweight boxing champions

Sporting positions
Regional boxing titles
Vacant Title last held by Lucas Matthysse	WBA Inter-Continental welterweight champion July 28, 2018 – February 2019; Vacated	Vacant Title next held by Nursultan Zhangabayev
Vacant Title last held by Luke Santamaria	WBC Continental Americas welterweight champion February 11, 2023 – September 30, 2023; Won interim world title	Vacant Title next held by Gor Yeritsyan
World boxing titles
Vacant Title last held by Jessie Vargas	WBA light-welterweight champion Regular title September 28, 2019 – June 26, 2021	Succeeded by Gervonta Davis
Vacant Title last held by Robert Guerrero	WBC welterweight champion Interim title September 30 – June 18, 2024; Promoted	Vacant
Preceded by Terence Crawford; Status changed	WBC welterweight champion June 18, 2024 – February 22, 2026	Succeeded by Ryan Garcia
