= Óscar Escandón =

Colombian boxer (born 1984)

Personal information
- Nickname: El Guerrero
- Nationality: Colombian
- Born: Óscar Eduardo Escandón; July 10, 1984 (age 42) Ibagué, Colombia
- Height: 5 ft 1 1/2 in (156 cm)
- Weight: Bantamweight; Super bantamweight; Featherweight

Boxing career
- Reach: 66 in (168 cm)
- Stance: Orthodox

Boxing record
- Total fights: 35
- Wins: 27
- Win by KO: 18
- Losses: 8
Medal record
Representing Colombia
South American Games
Silver medal – second place	2006 Buenos Aires	Bantamweight

Oscar Eduardo Escandón Berrío (born July 10, 1984) is a Colombian professional boxer who participated in the 2004 Summer Olympics for his native South American country. There he was stopped in the round of sixteen of the Flyweight (– 51 kg) division by Germany's Rustamhodza Rahimov. He qualified for the Olympic Games by ending up in first place at the 2nd AIBA American 2004 Olympic Qualifying Tournament in Rio de Janeiro, Brazil.

== Professional career ==
On March 5, 2016, he became the WBC Featherweight interim champion by knocking out Mexican boxer Robinson Castellanos. He would go to fight full champion Gary Russell Jr, he would go on get stopped by Russell in the 7th round.

His win over Tyson Cave to win the Interim WBA Super Bantamweight title is regarded by many as a robbery, and is one of the most controversial decisions in boxing history.

On 20 May 2017, Escandon challenged Gary Russel Jr for the WBC featherweight title. Escandon was knocked down twice in the fight, the second knockdown, in the seventh round, being the decisive one. Escandon managed to get up, but was on shaky legs, as the referee waved the fight off.

His next fight was against Tugstsogt Nyambayar. Escandon dropped Nyambayar in the first round. In the second round, however, it was Nyambayar who managed to drop Escandon twice. In the third round, Nyambayar continued his dominance, dropping Escandon three times, the third time being the final one before the contest was waved off.

On 30 September 2018, Escandon suffered his third loss in a row, this time against Brandon Figueroa. Figueroa was dominating the final rounds, before finishing Escandon in the tenth round, with a big uppercut that sent Escandon to the canvas. Escandon was in no condition to continue and the referee was forced to stop the fight.

== Professional boxing record ==
33 fights	27 wins	6 losses
By knockout	18	4
By decision	9	2

No.	Result	Record	Opponent	Type	Round, time	Date	Location	Notes
33	Win	27–6	Angel Tamez Urcid	UD	6 (6)	2022-12-09	Payne Arena, Hidalgo, Texas, U.S.	
32	Loss	26–6	Carlos Castro	KO	10 (10)	2021-08-21	T-Mobile Arena, Paradise, Nevada, U.S.	
31	Win	26–5	Jhack Tepora	KO	1 (10)	2019-12-21	Toyota Arena, Ontario, California, U.S.	
30	Loss	25–5	Brandon Figueroa	TKO	10 (10)	2018-09-30	Citizens Business Bank Arena, Ontario, California, U.S.	
29	Loss	25–4	Tugstsogt Nyambayar	KO	3 (10)	2018-05-26	Beau Rivage Resort & Casino, Biloxi, Mississippi, U.S.	
28	Loss	25–3	Gary Russell Jr.	TKO	7 (12)	2017-05-20	MGM National Harbor, Oxon Hill, Maryland, U.S.	For WBC Featherweight title
27	Win	25–2	Robinson Castellanos	KO	7 (12)	2016-03-05	D.C. Armory, Washington, D.C., U.S.	Won interim WBC Featherweight title
26	Loss	24–2	Moises Flores	SD	12 (12)	2015-04-18	StubHub Center, Carson, California, U.S.	Lost interim WBA Super Bantamweight title
25	Win	24–1	Tyson Cave	12 (12)	2014-12-11	Pechanga Resort & Casino, Temecula, California, U.S.	Won interim WBA Super Bantamweight title	
24	Win	23–1	Julian Aristule	KO	6 (10)	2014-08-08	Polideportivo Fray Mamerto Esquiú, Catamarca, Argentina	
23	Loss	22–1	Nehomar Cermeño	SD	12 (12)	2013-08-10	Megapolis Convention Center, Panama City, Panama	For interim WBA Super Bantamweight title
22	Win	22–0	Javier Coronado	TKO	1 (10)	2013-03-16	Megapolis Convention Center, Panama City, Panama	Won interim WBC Latino Featherweight title
21	Win	21–0	Michael Arango	KO	1 (8)	2012-12-21	Teledique Studios, Arjona, Colombia	
20	Win	20–0	Alvaro Vargas	KO	5 (6)	2012-10-20	Coliseo Cubierto Elías Chegwin, Barranquilla, Colombia	
19	Win	19–0	Ever Garcia Hernandez	UD	8 (8)	2012-06-15	Coliseo Cubierto Elías Chegwin, Barranquilla, Colombia	
18	Win	18–0	Tadeu Almeida Pantoja	TKO	2 (10)	2012-03-30	Coliseo Bernardo Caraballo, Cartagena, Colombia	
17	Win	17–0	Jesús Cuellar	TKO	7 (12)	2011-10-15	Centro Recreativo Municipal, Barrio Santa Paula, Argentina	
16	Win	16–0	Hugo Berrio	TKO	5 (8)	2011-06-24	Coliseo Elias Chegwin, Barranquilla, Colombia	
15	Win	15–0	Luis Felipe Cuadrado	KO	3 (12)	2011-03-25	Coliseo Bernardo Caraballo, Cartagena, Colombia	Won vacant WBC Latino bantamweight title
14	Win	14–0	Eduardo Pacheco	KO	1 (8)	2011-03-05	Coliseo San Vicente, Sincelejo, Colombia	
13	Win	13–0	Manuel de los Reyes	KO	2 (8)	2011-02-05	Coliseo Bernardo Caraballo, Cartagena, Colombia	
12	Win	12–0	Nelson Cantero	UD	10 (10)	2010-12-27	Coliseo Bernardo Caraballo, Cartagena, Colombia	
11	Win	11–0	Edinson Jimenez	UD	6 (6)	2010-12-04	Coliseo San Vicente, Sincelejo, Colombia	
10	Win	10–0	Benjamin Rivas	KO	2 (10)	2010-11-17	Discoteka Trucupey, Barranquilla, Colombia	
9	Win	9–0	Elvis Garcia	UD	8 (8)	2010-10-30	Centro de Convenciones, Cartagena, Colombia	
8	Win	8–0	Adolfo Ramos	UD	8 (8)	2010-09-25	Estadio Heriberto Carrillo, Repelon, Atlantico, Colombia	
7	Win	7–0	Edison Valencia Diaz	TKO	5 (8)	2010-07-30	Cancha El Monumental, Cartagena, Colombia	
6	Win	6–0	Jelier Pacheco	KO	2 (4)	2010-06-25	Coliseo Cubierto, Puerto Colombia, Colombia	
5	Win	5–0	Alfonso De la Hoz	UD	8 (8)	2010-05-21	Coliseo Bernardo Caraballo, Cartagena, Colombia	
4	Win	4–0	Alexis Puello Sarabia	KO	1 (4)	2010-04-30	Parque de las Américas, Mangangue, Colombia	
3	Win	3–0	Gabriel Martinez	KO	1 (6)	2009-12-11	Coliseo Miguel "Happy" Lora, Monteria, Colombia	
2	Win	2–0	Walberto Zuniga	KO	2 (4)	2009-10-02	Coliseo Miguel "Happy" Lora, Monteria, Colombia	
1	Win	1–0	Luis Meza	PTS	4 (4)	2008-06-06	Coliseo Miguel "Happy" Lora, Monteria, Colombia	

Achievements
Vacant Title last held by Nehomar Cermeño	WBA super bantamweight champion Interim title December 11, 2014 – April 18, 2015	Succeeded by Moises Flores
Vacant Title last held by Óscar Larios	WBC featherweight champion Interim title March 5, 2016 – May 20, 2017; Lost bid for full title	Vacant Title next held by Brandon Figueroa
