= John Leo Dato =

Filipino boxer

Personal information
- Nickname: The Lion
- Nationality: (Philippines) Filipino
- Born: John Leo Olpindo Dato; June 9, 1993 (age 33) Bangar, La Union, Philippines
- Height: 5 ft 6 in (1.68 m)
- Weight: Featherweight; Super Featherweight; Lightweight

Boxing career
- Stance: Orthodox

Boxing record
- Total fights: 21
- Wins: 19
- Win by KO: 12
- Losses: 1
- Draws: 1

John Leo Olpindo Dato (born June 9, 1993) is a Filipino professional boxer.

== Personal life ==
Dato was born in Bangar, La Union, Philippines. Dato is a son of Filipinos who worked as caregivers in the US, his family migrated to Bakersfield, California when he was seven years of age.

Dato attended Pioneer Valley High School in Santa Maria, California. During his high school days Dato was a wrestler, track and field player and footballer. Dato pursued his career in boxing after graduating high school when he was 17-years old.

Dato runs the JLD Boxing Academy and also currently works as a personal trainer.

== Boxing career ==
=== Featherweight division ===
On 15 December 2016, Dato made his professional debut in boxing. Dato defeated Mexican boxer Manuel Bernal via a Round 3 knockout (KO). Following the bout, Dato defeated Mexican boxer Guadalupe Arroyo, winning a majority decision (MD) through four rounds.

On 15 July 2017, Dato extended his winning streak in just 4 months after his win against Arroyo by defeating Mexican boxer Eduardo Ronquillo via a Round 3 knockout (KO). 5 months later, Dato registered another victory by defeating Mexican boxer Victor Manuel Martinez Flores via a Round 1 knockout (KO).

On 19 January 2018, just 1 month from his previous fight, Dato defeated American boxer Michael Gaxiola, winning a unanimous decision (UD) through four rounds, all judges scored 40–35 in favor of Dato. 6 months later, Dato received his first draw of his boxing career against Mexican boxer Pedro Antonio Rodriguez, the match ended in a technical draw (TD).

A month later following his technical draw (TD) against Rodriguez, Dato once again defeated American boxer Michael Gaxiola via a Round 4 knockout (KO).

=== Super Featherweight division ===
Following the bout, Dato moved up one division, to super featherweight, defeated Mexican boxer Jose Iniguez two months after his second fight with Gaxiola, winning a knockout (KO) in the first round. Dato once again defeated Mexican boxer Guadalupe Arroyo, winning a unanimous decision (UD) through four rounds, all judges scored 40–35 in favor of Dato.

On 11 January 2019, one month after his second win against Arroyo, Dato defeated American boxer Aaron Jamel Hollis via a Round 4 knockout (KO).

=== Lightweight division ===
Dato moved up one division, to lightweight, defeated Mexican boxer Miguel Villalobos via a Round 3 knockout (KO).

=== Return to Super Featherweight ===
Following the bout, Dato moved down one division, back to Super featherweight, defeated Mexican boxer Germán Meraz, winning a unanimous decision (UD) through six rounds.

=== Return to Featherweight ===
==== Pacquiao vs. Thurman ====
Dato returned to featherweight and defeated Mexican Boxer Juan Antonio Lopez via a Round 5 knockout (KO). The match was one of the undercard bouts in Manny Pacquiao vs. Keith Thurman pay-per-view fight.

In October 2019, Dato once again defeated Mexican boxer Germán Meraz, winning a unanimous decision (UD) through six rounds, all judges scored 60–53 in favor of Dato.

In December 2019, Dato defeated Mexican boxer David Godinez via a Round 5 KO.

Dato was scheduled to fight Dominican boxer Angel Luna in April 2020, but the fight was moved to June 2020, in response to the COVID-19 pandemic.

In August 2020, after months of waiting, Dato finally returned to the ring and defeated Mexican boxer Angel Guevara via a Round 3 TKO. Following the bout, more than two months after his win against Guevara, Dato defeated Mexican boxer Jorge Romero via a Round 5 TKO extending his unbeaten streak to 17.

==== Pacquiao vs. Ugás ====
In August 2021, it was announced that Dato is scheduled to fight Mexican Boxer Angel Antonio Contreras. The match was one of the undercard bouts in Manny Pacquiao vs. Yordenis Ugás pay-per-view fight.

=== Return to Super Featherweight ===
After more than seven months from his first professional loss, Dato moved up one division and returned to super featherweight. He was scheduled to fight Mexican veteran boxer Rodrigo Guerrero on 1 April 2022 at Chumash Casino, Sta. Ynez, California. He defeated Guerrero via a round 5 TKO.

His next fight was then scheduled on 13 January 2023 against American boxer Jesus Rizo. He defeated Rizo via a unanimous decision (UD) through eight rounds.

=== Return to Featherweight ===
Dato once again returned to featherweight. He is then scheduled to fight Venezuelan boxer Ronal Ron on October 27, 2023. He defeated Ron via a unanimous decision (UD) through eight rounds.

== Professional boxing record ==
21 fights	19 wins	1 loss
By knockout	12	0
By decision	7	1
Draws	1	

No.	Result	Record	Opponent	Type	Round, time	Date	Location	Notes
21	Win	19–1–1	(Venezuela) Ronal Ron	UD	8	27 Oct 2023	(United States) Chumash Casino Resort, Santa Ynez, California, U.S.	
20	Win	18–1–1	(United States) Jesus Rizo	UD	8	13 Jan 2023	(United States) Chumash Casino Resort, Santa Ynez, California, U.S.	
19	Win	17–1–1	(Mexico) Rodrigo Guerrero	TKO	5 (8)	1 Apr 2022	(United States) Chumash Casino Resort, Santa Ynez, California, U.S.	
18	Loss	16–1–1	(Mexico) Angel Antonio Contreras	UD	8	21 Aug 2021	(United States) T-Mobile Arena, Paradise, Nevada, U.S.	
17	Win	16–0–1	(Mexico) Jorge Romero	TKO	5 (8)	13 Nov 2020	Papas & Beer, Rosarito, Baja California, Mexico	
16	Win	15–0–1	(Mexico) Angel Guevara	TKO	3 (8)	28 Aug 2020	Papas & Beer, Rosarito, Baja California, Mexico	
15	Win	14–0–1	(Mexico) David Godinez	KO	5 (6)	13 Dec 2019	Big Punch Arena, Tijuana, Baja California, Mexico	
14	Win	13–0–1	(Mexico) Germán Meraz	UD	6	4 Oct 2019	(United States) Chumash Casino Resort, Santa Ynez, California, U.S.	
13	Win	12–0–1	(Mexico) Juan Antonio Lopez	KO	5 (6)	20 Jul 2019	(United States) MGM Grand Garden Arena, Las Vegas, Nevada, U.S.	
12	Win	11–0–1	(Mexico) Germán Meraz	UD	6	1 Jun 2019	(United States) Sobobo Casino Resort, San Jacinto, California, U.S.	
11	Win	10–0–1	(Mexico) Miguel Villalobos	KO	3 (4)	3 May 2019	Centro de Eventos, Tijuana, Baja California, Mexico	
10	Win	9–0–1	(United States) Aaron Jamel Hollis	KO	4 (4)	11 Jan 2019	(United States) Chumash Casino Resort, Santa Ynez, California, U.S.	
9	Win	8–0–1	(Mexico) Guadalupe Arroyo	UD	4	8 Dec 2018	(United States) Industry Hills Expo Center, La Puente, California, U.S.	Won GBO California State super featherweight title
8	Win	7–0–1	(Mexico) Jose Iniguez	KO	1 (4)	13 Oct 2018	La Officina Bar & Eventos, Tijuana, Baja California, Mexico	
7	Win	6–0–1	(United States) Michael Gaxiola	KO	4 (4)	18 Aug 2018	(United States) Westin Bonaventure Hotel, Los Angeles, California, U.S.	
6	Draw	5–0–1	(Mexico) Pedro Antonio Rodriguez	TD	4	6 July 2018	(United States) Chumash Casino Resort, Santa Ynez, California, U.S.	
5	Win	5–0	(United States) Michael Gaxiola	UD	4	19 Jan 2018	(United States) California Education and Performing Arts Center, Ontario, California, U.S.	
4	Win	4–0	(Mexico) Victor Manuel Martinez Flores	KO	1 (4)	9 Dec 2017	Gimnasio Independencia, Tijuana, Baja California, Mexico	
3	Win	3–0	(Mexico) Eduardo Ronquillo	KO	3 (4)	15 Jul 2017	(United States) Quiet Cannon, Montebello, California, U.S.	
2	Win	2–0	(Mexico) Guadalupe Arroyo	MD	4	19 Mar 2017	(United States) Marconi Automotive Museum, Tustin, California, U.S.	
1	Win	1–0	(Mexico) Manuel Bernal	KO	3 (4)	15 Dec 2016	AS Boxing Arena, Tijuana, Baja California, Mexico	

== Titles in boxing ==
=== Minor titles ===
- GBO California State Super Featherweight title (128 lbs)
