= Carlos Castro (boxer) =

American boxer (born 1994)

Carlos Alejandro Castro
Personal information
- Nationality: American
- Born: March 6, 1994 (age 32) Ciudad Obregón, Mexico
- Height: 5 ft 9 in (175 cm)
- Weight: Super bantamweight; Featherweight

Boxing career
- Reach: 70 in (178 cm)
- Stance: Orthodox

Boxing record
- Total fights: 34
- Wins: 30
- Win by KO: 14
- Losses: 4

Carlos Alejandro Castro Manriquez (born March 6, 1994) is an American professional boxer. He fought for the WBC featherweight title in 2026.

== Early life ==
Born in Ciudad Obregón, Castro was brought to the United States as a young child and settled in Phoenix, Arizona. His father introduced him to boxing around the age of seven.

== Professional career ==
Castro made his professional debut on June 16, 2016, scoring a four-round unanimous decision (UD) victory against Tony Green at the Celebrity Theatre in Phoenix, Arizona.

After compiling a record of 19–0 (8 KOs), he returned to the Celebrity Theatre to face Alexis Santiago for the vacant WBC–USNBC super bantamweight title on February 24, 2018. After Castro landed a series of combinations in the tenth and final round, Santiago's corner threw in the towel at 1 minute 50 seconds into the round, handing Castro a technical knockout (TKO) victory and his first professional championship.

In June of that year, it was announced that Castro had signed a multi-year contract with Bob Arum's Top Rank promotional company. Following a UD victory against Diuhl Olguin in a non-title fight in August, Castro defeated Genesis Servania via UD on February 10, 2019, capturing the vacant WBC Continental Americas super bantamweight title at the Save Mart Arena in Fresno, California. The judges' scorecards read 100–90, 99–91 and 98–92.

After three more victories, two of which were title defenses, Castro moved up to the featherweight division. His first bout at the weight was a fourth-round stoppage victory against Cesar Juarez in July 2020. Castro's next fight came against former two-weight interim world champion Óscar Escandón on August 21, 2021 at the T-Mobile Arena in Paradise, Nevada. In a bout that served as part of the undercard for Manny Pacquiao vs. Yordenis Ugás, Castro scored knockdowns in rounds seven and ten, the latter of which promoted the referee to call a halt to the contest at 1 minute 8 seconds into the round, awarding Castro the vacant WBC Continental Americas featherweight title victory via tenth-round knockout (KO).

Castro faced Bruce Carrington for the vacant WBC featherweight title on January 31, 2026, at Madison Square Garden in New York. He lost by knockout in the ninth round.

== Professional boxing record ==
34 fights	30 wins	4 losses
By knockout	14	2
By decision	16	2

No.	Result	Record	Opponent	Type	Round, time	Date	Location	Notes
34	Loss	30–4	Bruce Carrington	KO	9 (12), 1:29	Jan 31, 2026	Madison Square Garden, New York, New York, U.S.	For vacant WBC featherweight title
33	Loss	30–3	Stephen Fulton	SD	10	Sep 14, 2024	T-Mobile Area, Las Vegas, Nevada, U.S.	
32	Win	30–2	Belmar Preciado	UD	10	Apr 27, 2024	Celebrity Theatre, Phoenix, Arizona, U.S.	
31	Win	29–2	Angel Luna	TKO	1 (8), 0:48	Oct 7, 2023	Celebrity Theatre, Phoenix, Arizona, U.S.	
30	Win	28–2	Alan Isaias Luques Castillo	TKO	9 (10), 1:26	May 6, 2023	Celebrity Theatre, Phoenix, Arizona, U.S.	
29	Loss	27–2	Brandon Figueroa	TKO	6 (12), 2:11	Jul 9, 2022	Alamodome, San Antonio, Texas, U.S.	
28	Loss	27–1	Luis Nery	SD	10	Feb 5, 2022	Michelob Ultra Arena, Paradise, Nevada, U.S.	For vacant WBC Silver and WBO Inter-Continental super bantamweight titles
27	Win	27–0	Óscar Escandón	KO	10 (10), 1:08	Aug 21, 2021	T-Mobile Arena, Paradise, Nevada, U.S.	Won vacant WBC Continental Americas featherweight title
26	Win	26–0	Cesar Juarez	RTD	4 (10), 3:00	Jul 9, 2020	MGM Grand Conference Center, Paradise, Nevada, U.S.	
25	Win	25–0	Jesus Ruiz	MD	10	Feb 21, 2020	Celebrity Theatre, Phoenix, Arizona, U.S.	Retained WBC Continental Americas super bantamweight title
24	Win	24–0	Daniel Lozano	TKO	1 (8), 2:13	Oct 12, 2019	Wild Horse Pass Hotel & Casino, Chandler, Arizona, U.S.	
23	Win	23–0	Mario Díaz	UD	10	May 11, 2019	Convention Center, Tucson, Arizona, U.S.	Retained WBC Continental Americas super bantamweight title
22	Win	22–0	Genesis Servania	UD	10	Feb 10, 2019	Save Mart Arena, Fresno, California, U.S.	Won vacant WBC Continental Americas super bantamweight title
21	Win	21–0	Diuhl Olguin	UD	8	Aug 25, 2018	Gila River Arena, Glendale, Arizona, U.S.	
20	Win	20–0	Alexis Santiago	TKO	10 (10), 1:50	Feb 24, 2018	Celebrity Theatre, Phoenix, Arizona, U.S.	Won vacant WBC–USNBC super bantamweight title
19	Win	19–0	Basilio Nieves	TKO	4 (8), 2:18	14 Oct 2017	Celebrity Theatre, Phoenix, Arizona, U.S.	
18	Win	18–0	Juan Palacios	UD	8	Apr 22, 2017	Celebrity Theatre, Phoenix, Arizona, U.S.	
17	Win	17–0	Germán Meraz	UD	8	Oct 29, 2016	Tolleson Veterans Park, Tolleson, Arizona, U.S.	
16	Win	16–0	Jorge Diaz	KO	1 (8), 2:18	Sep 3, 2016	Celebrity Theatre, Phoenix, Arizona, U.S.	
15	Win	15–0	Eduardo Rafael Reyes	TKO	3 (8), 1:04	Feb 20, 2016	Celebrity Theatre, Phoenix, Arizona, U.S.	
14	Win	14–0	Sergio Najera	TKO	3 (6), 1:28	Dec 12, 2015	Convention Center, Tucson, Arizona, U.S.	
13	Win	13–0	Jose Silveria	UD	6	Sep 26, 2015	Celebrity Theatre, Phoenix, Arizona, U.S.	
12	Win	12–0	Juan Carlos Guillen	UD	6	Aug 15, 2015	We Ko Pa Casino, Fort McDowell, Arizona, U.S.	
11	Win	11–0	Cesar Garcia	TKO	4 (6), 2:26	Jul 25, 2015	Celebrity Theatre, Phoenix, Arizona, U.S.	
10	Win	10–0	Angel Monrreal	TKO	4 (6), 0:44	May 23, 2015	Celebrity Theatre, Phoenix, Arizona, U.S.	
9	Win	9–0	Victor Serrano Islas	UD	6	May 15, 2015	US Airways Center, Phoenix, Arizona, U.S.	
8	Win	8–0	Raymond Chacon	UD	6	Apr 25, 2015	Celebrity Theatre, Phoenix, Arizona, U.S.	
7	Win	7–0	John Herrera	UD	4	Nov 15, 2014	Celebrity Theatre, Phoenix, Arizona, U.S.	
6	Win	6–0	Jamie Gutierrez	RTD	3 (4), 3:00	Sep 20, 2014	Celebrity Theatre, Phoenix, Arizona, U.S.	
5	Win	5–0	Miguelito Marti	TKO	1 (4), 1:50	Sep 21, 2013	Celebrity Theatre, Phoenix, Arizona, U.S.	
4	Win	4–0	Jazzma Hogue	UD	4	Mar 9, 2013	Celebrity Theatre, Phoenix, Arizona, U.S.	
3	Win	3–0	Eric McNorris	TKO	1 (4), 2:59	Nov 30, 2012	Celebrity Theatre, Phoenix, Arizona, U.S.	
2	Win	2–0	Angel Gonzalez	UD	4	Oct 6, 2012	Celebrity Theatre, Phoenix, Arizona, U.S.	
1	Win	1–0	Tony Green	UD	4	Jun 16, 2012	Celebrity Theatre, Phoenix, Arizona, U.S.	
