= Moises Flores =

Mexican boxer (born 1986)

Personal information
- Nickname: Chucky
- Born: November 17, 1986 (age 39) Guadalajara, Mexico
- Height: 5 ft 9 in (175 cm)
- Weight: Super bantamweight

Boxing career
- Reach: 69 in (175 cm)
- Stance: Orthodox

Boxing record
- Total fights: 36
- Wins: 25
- Win by KO: 17
- Losses: 8
- Draws: 1
- No contests: 2

Moises Flores (born November 17, 1986) is a Mexican professional boxer who is a former WBA interim and IBO super bantamweight champion.

== Professional career ==
Moises flores turned professional in 2008 and compiled a record of 22-0 (1 NC) before he won the WBA interim title at Super bantamweight by beating Colombia boxer Óscar Escandón. The World Boxing Association mandated a fight between Flores and full champion Guillermo Rigondeaux, in the fight Flores would be knocked out in the 1st round. The result of the fight would however be overturned to a no contest as the knockout blow was deemed to have landed after the bell.

In his next fight, Flores was slated to challenge Daniel Roman for his WBA super bantamweight belt. However, Flores failed to make weight, and even though the fight was still on, the title was not on the line for Flores. Roman won the fight convincingly, while punishing Flores with body shots in the process.

After that, Flores faced Brandon Figueroa in a WBA super bantamweight eliminator. Figueroa had a great start, and managed to drop Flores twice in the third round, the second time ending the fight with 1:35 to go.

== Professional boxing record ==
36 fights	25 wins	8 losses
By knockout	17	5
By decision	8	3
Draws	1	
No contests	2	

No.	Result	Record	Opponent	Type	Round, time	Date	Location	Notes
36	Loss	25–8–1 (2)	Nathan Devon Rodriguez	KO	1 (8)	2022-08-27	Smith Park, Pico Rivera, California, U.S.	
35	Loss	25–7–1 (2)	Alejandro Reyes	KO	2 (6)	2022-06-11	Honda Center, Anaheim, California, U.S.	
34	Loss	25–6–1 (2)	Alfredo Escarcega	UD	6 (6)	2022-04-29	Celebrity Theatre, Phoenix, Arizona, U.S.	
33	Loss	25–5–1 (2)	Manuel Jaimes	KO	2 (8)	2021-12-04	Memorial Civic Auditorium, Stockton, California, U.S.	
32	Loss	25–4–1 (2)	Carlos Dixon	KO	1 (8)	2021-07-02	Iroquois Amphitheater, Louisville, Kentucky, U.S.	
31	Draw	25–3–1 (2)	Carlos Alberto Morales	TD	? (8)	2021-02-26	Hotel Canopy Hilton, Cancun, Mexico	
30	Loss	25–3 (2)	Leonardo Baez	UD	8 (8)	2020-02-06	Fantasy Springs Resort Casino, Indio, California, U.S.	
29	Loss	25–2 (2)	Brandon Figueroa	KO	3 (12)	2019-01-13	Microsoft Theater, Los Angeles, California, U.S.	
28	Loss	25–1 (2)	Daniel Roman	UD	12 (12)	2018-06-16	Ford Center at The Star, Frisco, Texas, U.S.	
27	NC	25–0 (2)	Guillermo Rigondeaux	NC	1 (12)	2017-06-17	Mandalay Bay Events Center, Paradise, Nevada, U.S.	Lost IBO, For WBA and lineal super bantamweight titles
26	Win	25–0 (1)	Paulus Ambunda	UD	12 (12)	2016-06-11	Ramatex Factory, Windhoek, Namibia	Retained WBA interim, Won IBO super bantamweight title
25	Win	24–0 (1)	Luis Emanuel Cusolito	TKO	12 (12)	2015-09-22	Sands Bethlehem Event Center, Bethlehem, Pennsylvania, U.S.	Retained WBA interim super bantamweight title
24	Win	23–0 (1)	Óscar Escandón	SD	12 (12)	2015-04-18	StubHub Center, Carson, California, U.S.	Won WBA interim super bantamweight title
23	Win	22–0 (1)	Mario Antonio Macias	TKO	7 (8)	2014-11-21	Hard Rock Hotel & Casino, Tulsa, Oklahoma, U.S.	Won WBC FECARBOX super bantamweight title
22	Win	21–0 (1)	Pablo Batres	UD	6 (6)	2014-09-26	Mesquite Arena, Mesquite, Texas, U.S.	
21	Win	20–0 (1)	Yair Secundino	TKO	4 (10)	2013-10-18	Palenque de la Feria, Tepic, Mexico	
20	Win	19–0 (1)	Marco Antonio Chable	KO	3 (10)	2013-07-13	Auditorio Morelos, Aguascalientes, Mexico	
19	Win	18–0 (1)	Rodolfo Hernandez	TKO	2 (8)	2013-02-23	Centro de Convenciones de Ixtapa, Ixtapa, Mexico	
18	NC	17–0 (1)	Mario Munoz	NC	4 (10)	2012-11-10	Expo Guadalajara, Guadalajara, Mexico	For IBF Youth super bantamweight title
17	Win	17–0	Oscar Arenas	KO	3 (6)	2012-09-08	Deportivo del Sindicato, Mexico City, Mexico	
16	Win	16–0	Arturo Emilio	TKO	4 (10)	2012-04-20	Arena Jalisco, Guadalajara, Mexico	
15	Win	15–0	Ivan Mosqueda	KO	1 (6)	2011-12-16	Arena Jalisco, Guadalajara, Mexico	
14	Win	14–0	Jorge Luis Alvarez	MD	6 (6)	2011-11-26	Plaza de Toros Rea, Mazatlan, Mexico	
13	Win	13–0	Martin Lopez	KO	3 (6)	2011-11-11	Arena Jalisco, Guadalajara, Mexico	
12	Win	12–0	Carlos Antonio Avilla	TKO	5 (8)	2011-10-07	Arena Jalisco, Guadalajara, Mexico	
11	Win	11–0	Carlos Velazquez	KO	1 (6)	2011-05-13	Arena Jalisco, Guadalajara, Mexico	
10	Win	10–0	Alexander Acosta	KO	3 (6)	2011-03-25	Arena Jalisco, Guadalajara, Mexico	
9	Win	9–0	Rene Vazquez	TKO	2 (6)	2011-02-11	Arena Jalisco, Guadalajara, Mexico	
8	Win	8–0	Heriberto Gutierrez	UD	4 (4)	2011-01-04	Arena Jalisco, Guadalajara, Mexico	
7	Win	7–0	Ulises Castillo	MD	4 (4)	2010-12-18	Deportivo Tlajomulco, Tlajomulco de Zúñiga, Mexico	
6	Win	6–0	Jorge Ibarra	MD	6 (6)	2010-04-03	Coliseo Olimpico de la UG, Guadalajara, Mexico	
5	Win	5–0	Silvestre Marquez	TKO	1 (6)	2010-03-12	Arena Jalisco, Guadalajara, Mexico	
4	Win	4–0	Rogelio Garcia	TKO	1 (4)	2009-11-28	Coliseo Olimpico de la UG, Guadalajara, Mexico	
3	Win	3–0	Eduardo Romero	UD	4 (4)	2009-01-24	Coliseo Olimpico de la UG, Guadalajara, Mexico	
2	Win	2–0	Francisco Serna	TKO	2 (4)	2008-10-04	Palenque Zapopum, Zapopan, Mexico	
1	Win	1–0	Oswaldo Salgado	KO	2 (4)	2008-08-29	Coliseo Olimpico de la UG, Guadalajara, Mexico	

Sporting positions
Minor world boxing titles
Preceded by Paulus Ambunda	IBO Super bantamweight champion June 11, 2016 – June 17, 2017; Vacant after Rigondeaux match	Vacant Title next held by Paulus Ambunda
Major world boxing titles
Preceded by Óscar Escandón	WBA super bantamweight champion Interim title April 18, 2015 – June 15, 2018; Stripped	Vacant Title next held by Brandon Figueroa
