= Bruce Carrington =

American boxer (born 1997)

Personal information
- Nickname: Shu Shu
- Born: April 17, 1997 (age 29) Brooklyn, New York, U.S.
- Height: 5 ft 8 in (173 cm)
- Weight: Featherweight

Boxing career
- Reach: 72 in (183 cm)
- Stance: Orthodox

Boxing record
- Total fights: 18
- Wins: 18
- Win by KO: 10

Bruce Carrington Jr. is an American professional boxer who has held the World Boxing Council (WBC) featherweight title since January 2026.

== Early life ==
Growing up in Brownsville, Brooklyn Carrington admitted his parents did a very good job from keeping him away from gang activities.

Carrington said his biggest boxing inspirations were Floyd Mayweather Jr. and Mike Tyson.

== Amateur career ==
Carrington had a very successful amateur career, winning the New York City Golden Gloves in 2017 and US Olympic Trials in 2020. Due to the COVID-19 pandemic causing the delay of the 2020 Olympics Games in Tokyo, Carrington decided to turn pro. He finished his amateur career with a record of 255 wins, 31 losses.

== Professional career ==
Carrington made his debut on the undercard of Tyson Fury vs. Deontay Wilder III on October 9, 2021, at the T-Mobile Arena. He won comfortably on points in a 4 rounder. In 2023, Carrington won The Ring magazine Prospect of the Year.

Carrington was scheduled to face Enrique Vivas at The Theater at Madison Square Garden in New York on June 8, 2024. On June 5, 2024 it was announced that Vivas withdrew due to a visa issue. Vivas was replaced by Brayan De Gracia. Carrington won the fight by TKO in the eighth round, scoring two knockdowns along the way.

Carrington defeated Sulaiman Segawa at The Theater at Madison Square Garden on September 27, 2024 by majority decision.

Carrington defeated Dana Coolwell in an eight-round featherweight bout featured on the Jake Paul vs. Mike Tyson undercard at AT&T Stadium in Arlington, TX on November 15, 2024.

On March 29, 2025, Carrington faced Enrique Vivas at the Fontainebleau in Las Vegas, Nevada. Carrington won the fight by TKO in the third round.

=== WBC Featherweight Championship ===
==== Carrington vs. Castro ====
Carrington faced Carlos Castro for the vacant WBC featherweight title on January 31, 2026, at Madison Square Garden in New York. He won by knockout in the ninth round.

==== Carrington vs. Palacios ====
On July 4, 2026, Carrington made the first defense of his title, defeating Rene Palacios via unanimous decision at the Wolstein Center in Cleveland, Ohio. Carrington was awarded a one off commemorative 4 July special edition belt for the 250th anniversary of the United States.

== Professional boxing record ==
18 fights	18 wins	0 losses
By knockout	10	0
By decision	8	0

No.	Result	Record	Opponent	Type	Round, time	Date	Location	Notes
18	Win	18–0	Rene Palacios	UD	12	Jul 4, 2026	Wolstein Center, Cleveland, Ohio, U.S.	Retained WBC featherweight title
17	Win	17–0	Carlos Castro	KO	9 (12), 1:29	Jan 31, 2026	Madison Square Garden, New York City, New York, U.S.	Won vacant WBC featherweight title
16	Win	16–0	Mateus Heita	UD	12	Jul 26, 2025	The Theater at Madison Square Garden, New York City, New York, U.S.	Won vacant WBC interim featherweight title
15	Win	15–0	Enrique Vivas	TKO	3 (10), 0:53	Mar 29, 2025	Fontainebleau, Winchester, Nevada, U.S.	Retained NABF, and WBO Inter-Continental featherweight titles
14	Win	14–0	Dana Coolwell	UD	8	Nov 15, 2024	AT&T Stadium, Arlington, Texas, U.S.	Retained NABF, WBO Inter-Continental, and WBC Silver featherweight titles
13	Win	13–0	Sulaiman Segawa	MD	10	Sep 27, 2024	The Theater at Madison Square Garden, New York City, New York, U.S.	Retained NABF & WBO Inter-Continental featherweight titles; Won WBC Silver featherweight title
12	Win	12–0	Brayan De Gracia	TKO	8 (10), 2:56	Jun 8, 2024	The Theater at Madison Square Garden, New York City, New York, U.S.	Retained NABF, IBF International & WBO Inter-Continental featherweight titles
11	Win	11–0	Bernard Angelo Torres	KO	4 (10), 2:59	Feb 16, 2024	The Theater at Madison Square Garden, New York City, New York, U.S.	Won vacant NABF, IBF International & WBO Inter-Continental featherweight titles
10	Win	10–0	Jason Sanchez	TKO	2 (10), 2:59	Dec 9, 2023	Charles F. Dodge City Center, Pembroke Pines, Florida, U.S.	
9	Win	9–0	Angel Antonio Contreras	UD	8	Aug 26, 2023	Hard Rock Hotel & Casino, Tulsa, Oklahoma, U.S.	
8	Win	8–0	Luis Porozo	TKO	8 (8), 2:17	Jun 10, 2023	The Theater at Madison Square Garden, New York City, New York, U.S.	
7	Win	7–0	Brandon Chambers	KO	2 (8), 2:46	Apr 8, 2023	Prudential Center, Newark, New Jersey, U.S.	
6	Win	6–0	Juan Antonio Lopez	UD	6	Jan 14, 2023	Turning Stone Resort Casino, Verona, New York, U.S.	
5	Win	5–0	Jose Argel	UD	6	Sep 23, 2022	Prudential Center, Newark, New Jersey, U.S.	
4	Win	4–0	Adrian Leyva	TKO	6 (6), 0:01	Jun 18, 2022	The Theater at Madison Square Garden, New York City, New York, U.S.	
3	Win	3–0	Yeuri Andujar	KO	5 (6), 0:51	Mar 19, 2022	The Theater at Madison Square Garden, New York City, New York, U.S.	
2	Win	2–0	Steven Brown	KO	2 (4), 0:43	Jan 29, 2022	Hard Rock Hotel & Casino, Tulsa, Oklahoma, U.S.	
1	Win	1–0	Cesar Cantu	UD	4	Oct 9, 2021	T-Mobile Arena, Paradise, Nevada, U.S.	

== See also ==
- List of male boxers
- List of world featherweight boxing champions

Sporting positions
Regional boxing titles
Vacant Title last held by Isaac Dogboe	WBC-NABF featherweight champion February 16, 2024 – July 26, 2025; Won interim world title	Vacant Title next held by Rene Palacios
Vacant Title last held by Luis Reynaldo Nunez	IBF International featherweight champion February 16, 2024 – July 26, 2025; Won interim world title	Vacant Title next held by Lindelani Sibisi
Vacant Title last held by Oleg Malinovskyi	WBO Inter-Continental featherweight champion February 16, 2024 – May, 2025; Vacated	Vacant Title next held by Francesco Grandelli
Preceded by Sulaiman Segawa	WBC Silver featherweight champion September 27, 2024 – April, 2025; Vacated	Vacant Title next held by Nathaniel Collins
World boxing titles
Vacant Title last held by Brandon Figueroa	WBC featherweight champion Interim title July 26, 2025 – January 31, 2026; Won full title	Vacant
Vacant Title last held by Stephen Fulton	WBC featherweight champion January 31, 2026 – present	Incumbent
Awards
Previous: Keyshawn Davis	The Ring Prospect of the Year; 2023	Next: Moses Itauma
