= Manny Pacquiao vs. Mario Barrios =

2025 boxing match

Pacquiao Returns
- Date: July 19, 2025
- Venue: MGM Grand Garden Arena, Las Vegas, Nevada, U.S.
- Title(s) on the line: WBC welterweight title

Tale of the tape
Boxer	Mario Barrios	Manny Pacquiao
Nickname	El Azteca (The Aztec)	Pac-Man
Hometown	San Antonio, Texas, U.S.	General Santos, Philippines
Purse	$1,000,000	$12,000,000
Pre-fight record	29–2–1 (18 KO)	62–8–2 (39 KO)
Age	30 years, 2 months	46 years, 7 months
Height	6 ft (183 cm)	5 ft 5 1/2 in (166 cm)
Weight	146.2 lb (66 kg)	146.8 lb (67 kg)
Style	Orthodox	Southpaw
Recognition	WBC; Welterweight Champion	8-division world champion

Result
- Majority Draw via judges' decision (115-113, 114-114, 114-114)

Manny Pacquiao vs. Mario Barrios, billed as Pacquiao Returns, was a professional boxing match for the WBC welterweight championship. The event took place on July 19, 2025, at the MGM Grand Garden Arena in Las Vegas, Nevada.

== Background ==
Manny Pacquiao after losing the 2025 Philippine Senate election announced in May 21, 2025, that he is coming out of retirement at age 46. His last professional bout was with Yordenis Ugás in August 2021 with his opponent retaining the WBA super welterweight title. Pacquiao however did exhibition matches against DK Yoo and Rukiya Anpo.

Mario Barrios entered the bout as the WBC welterweight champion with the title on the line. Barrios gained the WBC interim title from Ugas in 2023 and had defended the title twice – defeating Fabián Maidana and drawing against Abel Ramos in 2024.

Barrios' trainer, Bob Santos said the boxer underwent a 14-week training camp in preparation for the fight against Pacquiao.

=== Entrance ===
Mario Barrios' entrance song bout wasn't explicitly stated, but his entrances typically feature a blend of traditional Mexican music and cultural elements. According to reports, Barrios' ring walks are designed in collaboration with the Kalipulli group and artist Javier Zinzun Jr., incorporating Mexican drums, dancers, and traditional regalia to pay tribute to his Nahua and Apache ancestry.

In contrast, Manny Pacquiao's entrance song for the fight was a combination of The Script's "Hall of Fame" and "Eye of the Tiger" by Survivor.

The match concluded in a draw. Judges scored the final round in favour of Barrios, which enabled him to retain the WBC welterweight title. After the fight, both boxers express interest in a possible rematch.

The judges’ decision sparked debate, with many pundits on social media feeling Pacquiao had done enough for a victory that would have made him the second oldest ever boxing world champion behind Bernard Hopkins.

The CompuBox stats reflected the close nature of the fight, with Pacquiao holding an 81-75 edge in power punches, while Barrios landed 45 jabs to Pacquiao’s 20. With a capacity crowd on their feet for every shot landed, Pacquiao showed early that he was stepping into the ring a better fighter than when he last competed in 2021.

=== Referee and judges ===
Thomas Taylor served as the referee in the ring whilst the judges who scored the bout were Tim Cheatham (Las Vegas), Max DeLuca (New York) and Steve Weisfeld (New Jersey).

== Aftermath ==
Pacquiao assessed his performance as satisfactory despite not winning against Barrios. The Filipino boxer says he plans his next bout to be sometime around December 2025.

The World Boxing Council (WBC) placed Pacquiao as the number one welterweight contender after the match.

== Scorecards ==
=== Main event scorecards ===
Nevada State Athletic Commission Official score card
Title: WBC Welterweight					Referee: Thomas Taylor					Supervisor: none				
Date: July 19, 2025					Venue: MGM Grand Garden Arena, Las Vegas					Promoter: TGB Promotions				
Pacquiao		vs.	Barrios		Pacquiao		vs.	Barrios		Pacquiao		vs.	Barrios	
RS	TS	Rd	TS	RS	RS	TS	Rd	TS	RS	RS	TS	Rd	TS	RS
10		1		9	10		1		9	10		1		9
9	19	2	19	10	9	19	2	19	10	9	19	2	19	10
9	28	3	29	10	9	28	3	29	10	9	28	3	29	10
10	38	4	38	9	9	37	4	39	10	9	37	4	39	10
9	47	5	48	10	10	47	5	48	9	10	47	5	48	9
10	57	6	57	9	10	57	6	57	9	10	57	6	57	9
10	67	7	66	9	9	66	7	67	10	10	67	7	66	9
10	77	8	75	9	10	76	8	76	9	10	77	8	75	9
10	87	9	84	9	10	86	9	85	9	10	87	9	84	9
9	96	10	94	10	9	95	10	95	10	9	96	10	94	10
9	105	11	104	10	9	104	11	105	10	9	105	11	104	10
9	114	12	114	10	9	113	12	115	10	9	114	12	114	10
FINAL SCORE	114	–	114	FINAL SCORE	FINAL SCORE	113	–	115	FINAL SCORE	FINAL SCORE	114	–	114	FINAL SCORE
Draw			Draw		Lost			Won		Draw			Draw	
Judge: Tim Cheatham					Judge: Max DeLuca					Judge: Steve Weisfeld				
Suspensions: None					Point deductions: None					Decision: Majority Draw				

=== Main event unofficial scorecards ===
	Writer	Agency	Scorecard	Winner
1	Dan Rafael	Big Fight Weekend	117-111	Pacquiao
2	Ryan Harkness	MMA Mania	115-113	Pacquiao
3	Phil Jay	WBN	115-113	Pacquiao
4	Bryan Tucker	MMA Fighting	116-112	Pacquiao
5	Wil Esco	Bad Left Hook	115-113	Barrios
6	Mark Anderson	Associated Press	115-113	Pacquiao
7	Brent Brookhouse	CBS Sports	116-112	Barrios
8	Josh Peter	USA Today	114-114	DRAW
9	Tom Naghten	The Sporting News	115-113	Barrios
10	Darshan Desai	EverythingBoxing	115-113	Pacquiao
11	Pow Salud	Powcast Sports	115-113	Pacquiao
12	Ernesto Amador	No Puedes Jugar Boxeo	116-112	Barrios
13	Alan Dawson	Uncrowned/Yahoo! Sports	116-112	Pacquiao
14	Fernando Barbosa	ESPN	115-113	Pacquiao
15	Dario BC	La Casaca Boxing	117-111	Barrios
16	Andreas Hale	ESPN	115-113	Pacquiao

Total, 16: Pacquiao 10 | Barrios 5 | Draw 1

== Fight card ==
Confirmed bouts:

Weight Class		vs.		Method	Round	Time	Notes
Welterweight	(United States) Mario Barrios (c)	draw	(Philippines) Manny Pacquiao	MD	12	3:00	^{Note 1}
Super welterweight	(United States) Sebastian Fundora (c)	def.	(Australia) Tim Tszyu	RTD	7/12	3:00	^{Note 2}
Super lightweight	(Mexico) Isaac Cruz	def.	(Mexico) Omar Salcido	UD	10	3:00	^{Note 3}
Featherweight	(United States) Brandon Figueroa	def.	(United States) Joet Gonzalez	UD	12	3:00	^{Note 4}
Featherweight	(United States) Gary Russell Jr	def.	(Mexico) Hugo Castaneda	TKO	10/10	0:26
Super Bantamweight	(Mexico) David Picasso	def.	(Japan) Kyonosuke Kameda	MD	10	3:00
Super featherweight	(Philippines) Mark Magsayo	def.	(Mexico) Jorge Mata	UD	10	3:00	^{note 5}
Middleweight	(Philippines) Eumir Marcial	def.	(United States) Bernard Joseph	KO	3/8	1:55

^Note 1 For WBC welterweight title
^Note 2 For WBC super welterweight title
^Note 3 For vacant WBC interim light welterweight title
^Note 4 WBA featherweight title eliminator
^Note 5 For vacant WBC Continental Americas super featherweight title

== Broadcasting ==
Country/Region	Free-to-air	Cable/Satellite	Pay-per-view	Streaming
United States (host)	—N/a		Prime Video PPV	
Philippines	One Sports; RPTV; TV5; Blast Sports	One Sports+ Premier Football; Premier Sports; Premier Sports 2 TAP Action Flix; TAP Sports	Cignal; SatLite; Vision/FiberTV; Planet Cable	Blast TV; Cignal Play iWant Tickets^{1} Pilipinas Live^{1}
International	—N/a			Blast TV; Cignal Play iWant Tickets^{1} Pilipinas Live^{1}

^1 Inside Philippine territory only

== Similar ==
- Manny Pacquiao vs. Brandon Ríos

Preceded by vs. Abel Ramos	Mario Barrios's bouts July 19, 2025	TBA
Preceded by vs. Yordenis Ugás	Manny Pacquiao's bouts July 19, 2025	TBA
