= Tyson Cave =

Canadian professional boxer (born 1981)

Personal information
- Nickname: The Princess of Hali
- Nationality: (Canada) Canadian
- Born: Tyson Dwayne Cave; November 24, 1981 (age 44) Halifax, Nova Scotia
- Occupation: Boxer
- Weight: Super Bantamweight

Boxing career
- Stance: Southpaw

Boxing record
- Total fights: 39
- Wins: 35
- Win by KO: 14
- Losses: 4

Tyson Cave (born November 24, 1981) is a Canadian professional boxer. He was the first Nova Scotia-born boxer to win a world championship on home soil.

== Early life ==
Tyson Cave was born in Halifax in the Canadian province of Nova Scotia. He grew up in the community of Fairview.

== Amateur career ==
Tyson Cave competed in his first amateur fight in 1999, and he went on to win multiple Canadian amateur boxing titles. A teenage Cave won the Canadian Light Flyweight title over 10-time national champion Domenic Filane in January 2000.

In June 2000, he beat Olympic-bound Mexican champion Liborio Romero in their 51-kilogram fight at the Parkinson's Cup Boxing Classic.

Cave competed at the 2001 Jeux de la Francophonie and won a bronze medal for Team Canada in the under 51 kg category.

His amateur run throughout the 2000s would take him to Finland and Puerto Rico to compete in international tournaments, as well as amateur events in Mexico, Brazil, England, and China. In 2002, he fought Abner Mares in Puerto Rico, and in 2005, he faced Gary Russell Jr in Mianyang, China. He earned a bronze medal in the flyweight division at the 2nd AIBA American 2004 Olympic Qualifying Tournament in Rio de Janeiro.

== Professional career ==
The southpaw, Tyson Cave, was trained by longtime coach Michael "Bunny" Phillips and managed by his father Robert Cave.

The Canadian prospect turned pro at Super Bantamweight at the Halifax Forum in 2006. His debut resulted in a win against Saul Gutierrez Hernandez of Mexico. In 2009, he claimed the vacant Canadian Super Bantamweight title in a bout against Steve Cannell.

Cave fought outside his native Canada for the first time in 2011. He faced AJ Banal for the WBO Asia Pacific Bantamweight Championship at the Hoops Dome in Lapu Lapu, Cebu, Philippines.

In March 2012, he defeated Jovanny Soto Ramirez for the WBC Continental Americas Super Bantamweight Championship. Following his Continental Americas victory, he met Steve Cannell in a September 2012 rematch—the first successful defense of his Canadian Super Bantamweight title.

In an August 2013 match that took place in Africville in Nova Scotia, he defeated Gabor Molna to win the Canadian Professional Boxing Council international title.

Cave won the vacant NABA Super Bantamweight Championship in April 2014 with a decision win over Sebastien Gauthier in Toronto. In December 2014, he lost a controversial split decision to Óscar Escandón in his bid to win the WBA Interim World Super Bantamweight title in Temecula, California. The final decision infuriated the ESPN broadcast announcers, with commentator Teddy Atlas voicing his outrage on air.

Cave won the WBU Super Bantamweight title in November 2015 by defeating Walter Rojas. The Halifax native was the first Nova Scotia-born boxer to win a world title on home soil.

In February 2019, he defeated Humberto de Santiago to become the IBU (1996–2016) World Lightweight titleholder. In November 2019, he won the WBC International Silver Super Bantamweight title.

== Professional boxing record ==
The Halifax fighter currently has a pro boxing record of 35 wins and 4 losses.

39 fights	35 wins	4 losses
By knockout	14	2
By decision	21	2
Draws	0	

== Honors and awards ==
- 2001 Jeux de la Francophonie Bronze Medalist (2001)
- Canadian Super Bantamweight Title (2009)
- Canadian-American-Mexican (CAM) Super Bantamweight Title (2010)
- Canadian Professional Boxing Council Featherweight Title (2013)
- WBC Continental Americas Super Bantamweight Title (2011)
- NABA Super Bantamweight Title (2013)
- WBU Super Bantamweight Title (2015)
- IBU (1996–2016) World Lightweight Title (2019)
