= Mark Magsayo =

Filipino boxer

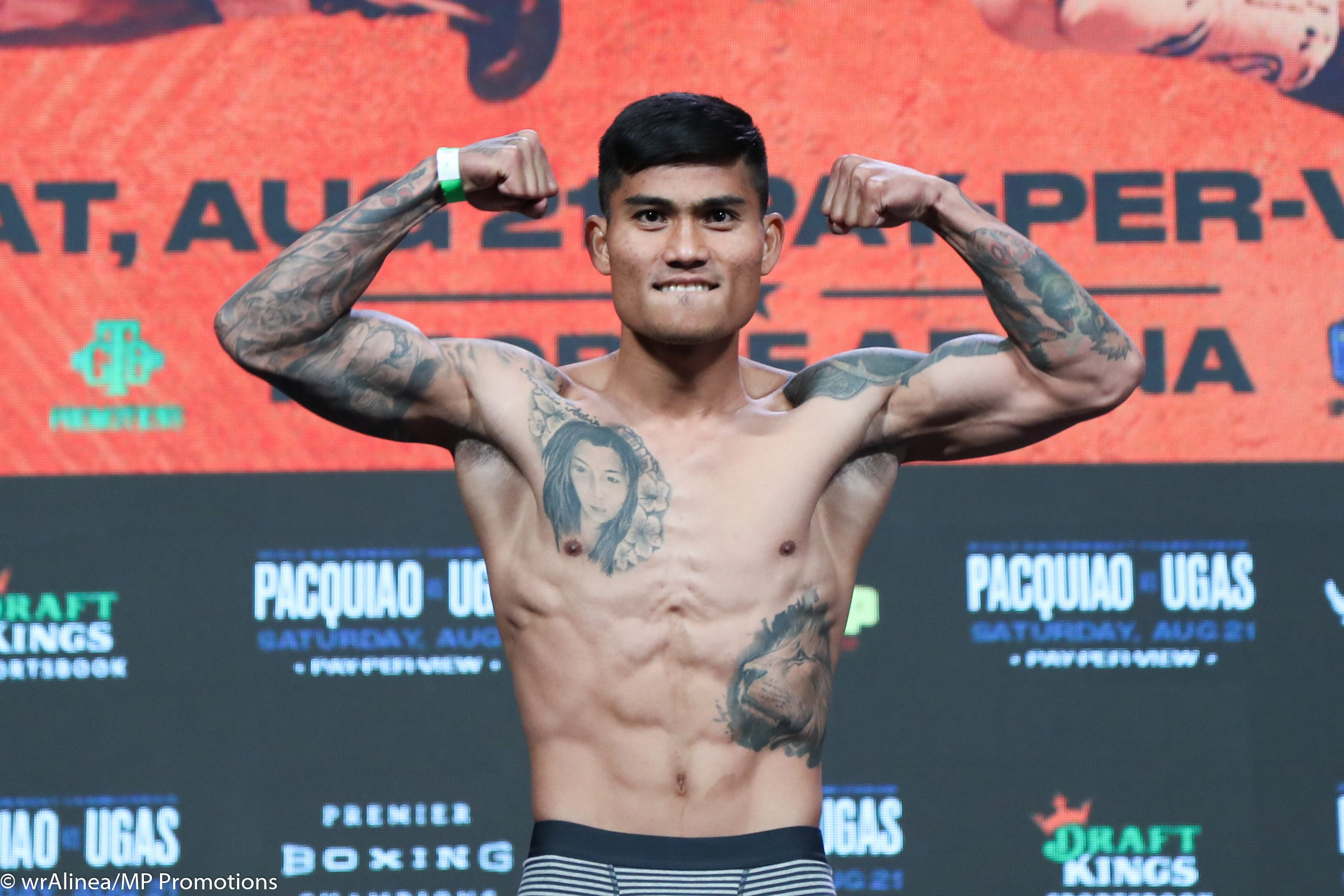
- Magsayo in 2021

Personal information
- Nickname: Magnifico (Magnificent)
- Born: Jessel Mark Araula Magsayo; June 22, 1995 (age 31) Tagbilaran City, Bohol, Philippines
- Height: 5 ft 6 1/2 in (169 cm)
- Weight: Featherweight; Super Featherweight

Boxing career
- Reach: 67 1/2 in (171 cm)
- Stance: Orthodox

Boxing record
- Total fights: 32
- Wins: 29
- Win by KO: 19
- Losses: 3

Jessel Mark Araula Magsayo (born June 22, 1995) is a Filipino professional boxer who held the WBC featherweight title in 2022.

== Amateur career ==
Magsayo began boxing when he was just 8 years old and by the time he had turned professional he had fought in around 200 amateur contests and was 4-time amateur boxing champion at the annual Amateur Boxing Association of the Philippines (ABAP) national tournaments. In those 4 tournaments he claimed the title of "Best Boxer" twice.

== Professional career ==
Magsayo made his professional debut against Melton Sandal on May 25, 2013. He won the fight by a first-round knockout. He amassed a 10–0 record during the next two years, before being scheduled to face Rafael Reyes for the vacant IBF Youth featherweight title. He won the fight by a fifth-round technical knockout. Magsayo was scheduled to defend his IBF Youth title against Yardley Suarez on July 11, 2015. He won the fight by a first-round knockout.

Magsayo was scheduled to face Eduardo Montoya for the vacant WBO Youth featherweight title on February 27, 2016. He won the fight by unanimous decision. Magsayo made his first WBO Youth title defense against Chris Avalos on April 23, 2016. He won the fight by a sixth-round technical knockout. Magsayo was scheduled to make his second title defense against Ramiro Robles on September 24, 2016. He won the fight by unanimous decision.

Magsayo was scheduled to fight Issa Nampepeche in a non-title bout on April 29, 2017. He won the fight by a first-round knockout. Magsayo was afterwards made his third WBO Youth title defense against Daniel Diaz on July 8, 2017. He won the fight by a first-round technical knockout. Magsayo made his fourth and final WBO Youth title defense against Shota Hayashi on November 25, 2017. He won the fight by unanimous decision.

On May 25, 2017, Magsayo's promotional contract with the ALA group expired. On June 4, 2017, it was announced that Magsayo had signed with the Now Boxing Promotions.

Magsayo returned from a 17-month absence from the sport to face Erick Deztroyer on April 12, 2019. He won the fight by a fourth-round knockout. Magsayo challenged Panya Uthok for the WBC-ABC featherweight title in his next fight, which was scheduled for August 29, 2019. He won the fight by unanimous decision.

=== Magsayo vs. Cruz ===
Magsayo was scheduled to face Rigoberto Hermosillo on October 4, 2020. He won the fight by split decision. Magsayo was next scheduled to face Pablo Cruz on April 10, 2021. He won the fight by a fourth-round technical knockout.

=== Magsayo vs. Ceja ===
Magsayo faced Julio Ceja in a WBC featherweight title eliminator on August 21, 2021, on the undercard of Manny Pacquiao vs. Yordenis Ugás, with the winner of the bout earning the right to challenge the reigning champion Gary Russell Jr. Ceja was ranked #12 by the WBC at featherweight. He won the fight by a tenth-round knockout that was selected as the Premier Boxing Champions Knockout of the Year 2021.

=== WBC featherweight champion ===
==== Magsayo vs. Russell Jr ====
On September 21, 2021, the WBC ordered Gary Russell Jr. to defend his featherweight title against Magsayo. The title bout was scheduled as the main event of a Showtime broadcast card, which took place at the Borgata in Atlantic City, New Jersey on January 22, 2022. Despite being the underdog Magsayo won his first world title by majority decision. Two judges scored the fight 115–113 for Magsayo, while the third judge scored the fight as an even 114–114 draw. Magsayo ends Gary Russell's seven-year title reign and became the new WBC featherweight champion expressing his win saying “This is a dream come true,” “This was my dream since I was a kid, since I was an amateur. And now I’m champion. This is my dream.”

=== Post-championship ===
==== Magsayo vs. Ramirez ====
Late May 2024 it was announced that Magsayo would face Eduardo Ramirez in a WBC super featherweight title eliminator and on early June 2024, the WBA announced that they will be sanctioning the fight (For the vacant WBA Inter-continental title) at MGM Grand Garden Arena in Las Vegas on June 15, 2024. Magsayo won the fight by unanimous decision.

==== Magsayo vs. Mata ====
Magsayo was scheduled to face Jorge Mata Cuellar in a super featherweight bout at MGM Grand Garden Arena in Las Vegas, on July 19, 2025.

=== Zuffa Boxing ===
In early 2026, Magsayo signed with Zuffa Boxing.

Magsayo made his promotional debut at Zuffa Boxing 5 on April 5, 2026, defeating Feargal McCrory by fourth-round TKO in a lightweight bout at the Meta APEX in Las Vegas.

Magsayo is scheduled to face Andres Cortes in a 10-round lightweight bout at T-Mobile Arena in Las Vegas on September 12, 2026.

== Professional boxing record ==
32 fights	29 wins	3 losses
By knockout	19	0
By decision	10	3

no.	Result	Record	Opponent	Type	Round, time	Date	Location	Notes
32	Loss	29–3	Andres Cortes	UD	10	Sep 12, 2026	T-Mobile Arena, Paradise, Nevada, U.S.	
31	Win	29–2	Feargal McCrory	TKO	5 (10), 0:21	Apr 5, 2026	Meta Apex, Enterprise, Nevada, U.S.	
30	Win	28–2	Jorge Mata	UD	10	Jul 19, 2025	MGM Grand Garden Arena, Paradise, Nevada U.S.	Won vacant WBC Continental Americas super featherweight title
29	Win	27–2	Bryan Mercado	KO	2 (6), 0:28	Dec 14, 2024	Thunder Studios, Long Beach, California, U.S.	
28	Win	26–2	Eduardo Ramirez	UD	10	Jun 15, 2024	MGM Grand Garden Arena, Paradise, Nevada, U.S.	Won vacant WBA Inter-Continental super featherweight title
27	Win	25–2	Isaac Avelar	KO	3 (8), 1:13	Dec 9, 2023	Thunder Studios, Long Beach, California, U.S.	
26	Loss	24–2	Brandon Figueroa	UD	12	Mar 4, 2023	Toyota Arena, Ontario, California, US	For vacant WBC interim featherweight title
25	Loss	24–1	Rey Vargas	SD	12	Jul 9, 2022	Alamodome, San Antonio, Texas, US	Lost WBC featherweight title
24	Win	24–0	Gary Russell Jr.	MD	12	Jan 22, 2022	Borgata, Atlantic City, New Jersey, US	Won WBC featherweight title
23	Win	23–0	Julio Ceja	KO	10 (12), 2:33	Aug 21, 2021	T-Mobile Arena, Paradise, Nevada, US	Won vacant WBO International featherweight title
22	Win	22–0	Pablo Cruz	TKO	4 (8), 0:48	Apr 10, 2021	Mohegan Sun Casino, Uncasville, Connecticut, US	
21	Win	21–0	Rigoberto Hermosillo	SD	10	Oct 3, 2020	Microsoft Theater, Los Angeles, California, US	
20	Win	20–0	Panya Uthok	UD	12	Aug 29, 2019	Tagbilaran City, Philippines	Won vacant WBC-ABCO featherweight title
19	Win	19–0	Erick Deztroyer	KO	4 (8), 2:00	Apr 12, 2019	The Ring Boxing Community, Singapore	
18	Win	18–0	Shota Hayashi	UD	12	Nov 25, 2017	Tagbilaran City, Philippines	Retained WBO International featherweight title
17	Win	17–0	Daniel Diaz	TKO	1 (12), 1:45	Jul 8, 2017	IEC Convention Center, Cebu City, Philippines	Retained WBO International featherweight title
16	Win	16–0	Issa Nampepeche	TKO	1 (10), 2:05	Apr 29, 2017	Waterfront Hotel & Casino, Barangay Lahug, Cebu City, Philippines	
15	Win	15–0	Ramiro Robles	UD	12	Sep 24, 2016	StubHub Center, Carson, California, US	Retained WBO International featherweight title
14	Win	14–0	Chris Avalos	TKO	6 (12)	Apr 23, 2016	Cebu City Sports Complex, Cebu City, Philippines	Won vacant WBO International featherweight title
13	Win	13–0	Eduardo Montoya	UD	10	Feb 27, 2016	Cebu City Waterfront Hotel & Casino, Barangay Lahug, Cebu City, Philippines	Won vacant WBO Youth featherweight title
12	Win	12–0	Yardley Suarez	KO	1 (10), 2:00	Oct 17, 2015	StubHub Center, Carson, California, US	Retained IBF Youth featherweight title
11	Win	11–0	Rafael Reyes	TKO	5 (10), 2:29	Jul 11, 2015	Cebu City Waterfront Hotel & Casino, Barangay Lahug, Cebu City, Philippines	Won vacant IBF Youth featherweight title
10	Win	10–0	Sukpraserd Ponpitak	TKO	5 (10), 2:19	Mar 7, 2015	University of SouthEastern Philippines Gym, Barrio Obrero, Davao City, Philippines	
9	Win	9–0	Moon Sun Jung	TKO	2 (6)	Nov 15, 2014	Cebu City Waterfront Hotel & Casino, Barangay Lahug, Cebu City, Philippines	
8	Win	8–0	Jessie Tuyor	TKO	1 (8), 1:37	Aug 9, 2014	Plaridel Covered Court, Plaridel, Philippines	
7	Win	7–0	Ernesto Tata Fontanilla	TKO	6 (6), 2:36	Jul 26, 2014	Island City Mall, Tagbilaran City, Philippines	
6	Win	6–0	Hyuk Tak Joo	UD	4	May 10, 2014	SM Mall of Asia Arena, Pasay, Philippines	
5	Win	5–0	Roy Sumugat	TKO	6 (6), 0:56	Mar 1, 2014	Solaire Resort Hotel and Casino, Parañaque, Philippines	
4	Win	4–0	Hagibis Quinones	KO	1 (4), 2:40	Sep 26, 2013	Cebu City Waterfront Hotel & Casino, Barangay Lahug, Cebu City, Philippines	
3	Win	3–0	John Rey Melligen	UD	12	Sep 24, 2013	Escalante City Coliseum, Escalante, Philippines	
2	Win	2–0	Jamjam Ungon	TKO	1 (4), 1:55	Jul 13, 2013	Solaire Resort Hotel and Casino, Pasay, Philippines	
1	Win	1–0	Melton Sandal	KO	1 (4), 2:09	May 25, 2013	Waterfront Hotel & Casino, Barangay Lahug, Cebu City, Philippines	

== Filmography ==
Year	Film	Role-playing	Other notes
2017	Magnifico: Lakas ng Kamao	Himself	ABS-CBN Sport Action Documentary Film

== See also ==
- List of world featherweight boxing champions
- List of Filipino boxing world champions

Sporting positions
World boxing titles
Preceded by Gary Russell Jr.	WBC featherweight champion January 22, 2022 – July 9, 2022	Succeeded by Rey Vargas
