= Manny Pacquiao vs. Yordenis Ugás =

2021 Boxing match

The Legend vs. The Olympian
- Date: August 21, 2021
- Venue: T-Mobile Arena; Paradise, Nevada, United States
- Title(s) on the line: WBA (Super) welterweight title

Tale of the tape
Boxer	Yordenis Ugás	Manny Pacquiao
Nickname	54 Milagros ("54 Miracles")	Pac-Man
Hometown	Santiago de Cuba, Cuba	General Santos, South Cotabato, Philippines
Pre-fight record	26–4 (12 KO)	62–7–2 (39 KO)
Age	35 years, 1 month	42 years, 8 months
Height	5 ft 9 in (175 cm)	5 ft 5 1/2 in (166 cm)
Weight	147 lb (67 kg)	146 lb (66 kg)
Style	Orthodox	Southpaw
Recognition	WBA (Super); Welterweight Champion; TBRB; No. 4 Ranked Welterweight; The Ring; No. 6 Ranked Welterweight	WBA; Welterweight Champion In Recess; The Ring; No. 3 Ranked Welterweight; 8-division world champion

Result
- Ugás wins via 12-round unanimous decision (116-112, 116-112, 115-113)

Manny Pacquiao vs. Yordenis Ugás, billed as The Legend vs. The Olympian, was a welterweight professional boxing match contested between former eight-division world champion Manny Pacquiao, and WBA (Super) champion Yordenis Ugás. The bout took place on August 21, 2021, at the T-Mobile Arena in Paradise, Nevada, United States. This was Manny Pacquiao's final boxing match before his retirement later that year.

== Background ==
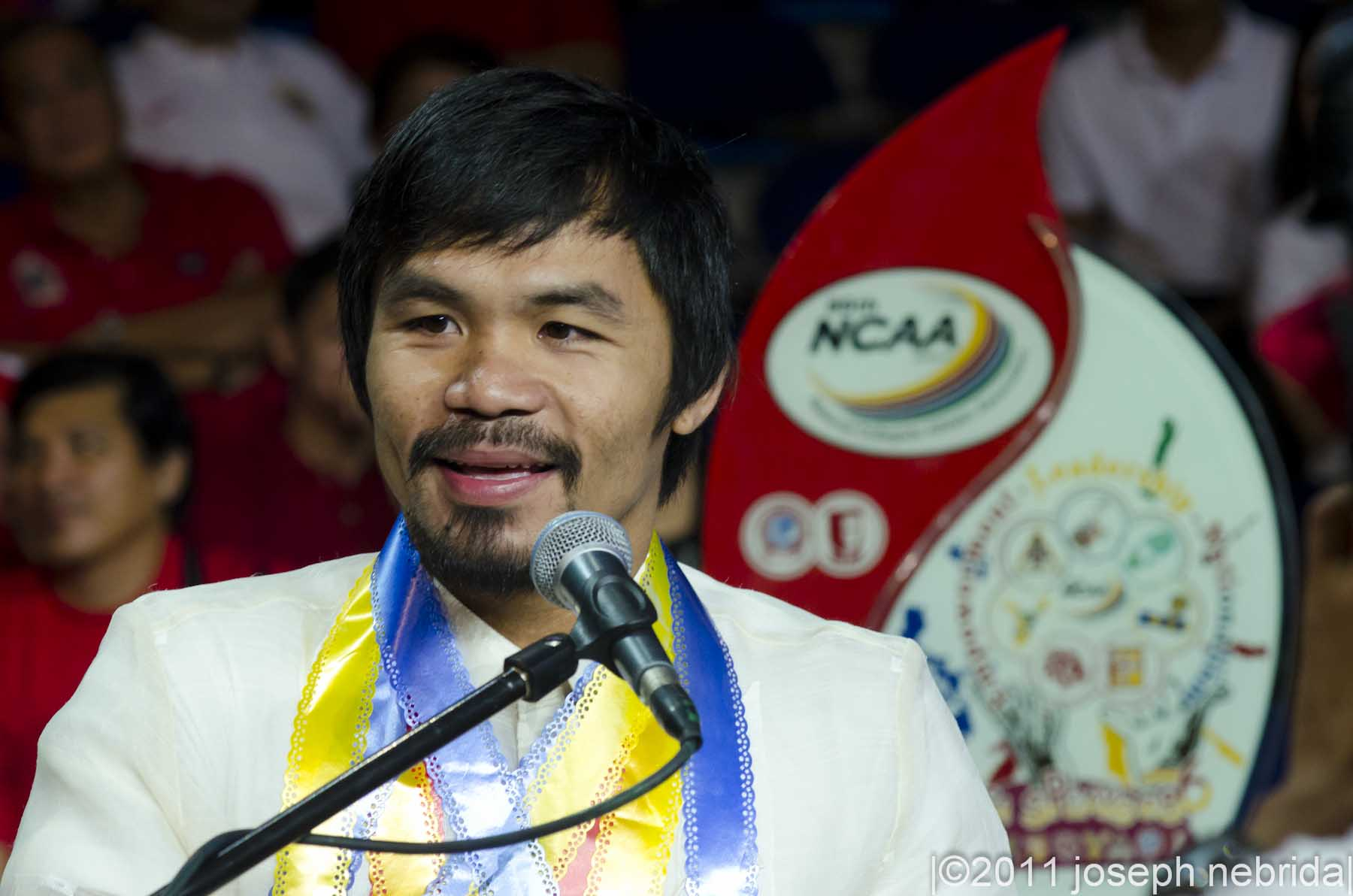
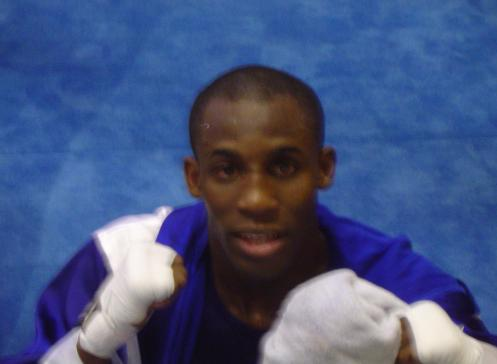
Manny Pacquiao (left) and Yordenis Ugás (right).

On May 21, 2021, former eight-division world champion Manny Pacquiao made the unexpected announcement on his social media that he would face undefeated WBC and IBF welterweight champion Errol Spence Jr. on August 21 in Las Vegas on Fox pay-per-view (PPV). Premier Boxing Champions and Fox confirmed the news, and it was reported that both men have signed contracts to face each other. The two men had previously already met more than two years prior on March 16, 2019, in the ring following Spence's unanimous decision victory over Mikey Garcia in Arlington, Texas, when both Pacquiao and Spence indicated they would relish the chance to fight each other. On June 23, the venue was officially announced as the T-Mobile Arena.

On August 10, it was announced that Spence would be replaced by WBA (Super) champion Yordenis Ugás, after being forced to pull out of the bout with Pacquiao due to suffering an injury to his left eye.

Professional wrestling promotion WWE hosted their annual SummerSlam pay-per-view event on the same night at the nearby Allegiant Stadium, which raised concerns over whether or not fans would be able to attend or watch both shows. WWE had planned to have SummerSlam end with enough time for fans to leave the Allegiant Stadium and make it over to the T-Mobile Arena to watch the main event fight between Pacquiao and Ugás, or for those watching at home, enough time to switch PPV channels. SummerSlam ended just as Pacquiao made his entrance.

=== National Anthem singers ===
- Philippines – Lupang Hinirang by J. Rey Soul of Black Eyed Peas
- United States – Star Spangled Banner by Meangirl

== The fight ==
The bout was a competitive affair, with Ugás using his jab and looping right hand effectively to control the distance. While Pacquiao had moments of success throughout the night, he never truly settled into a rhythm and was noticeably stiffer than usual, not showcasing the deft footwork that he has been known for throughout his career. Pacquiao himself admitted after the fight that his legs were "tight".

At the final bell, Ugás was awarded a unanimous decision victory with scores of 116–112, 116–112 and 115–113. According to CompuBox, Pacquiao threw over double the number of punches compared to Ugás, but landed fewer, making the latter the far more accurate boxer on the night. Pacquiao landed 130 punches of 815 thrown (16%), while Ugás landed 151 punches of 405 thrown (37.3%).

== Aftermath ==
In his post-fight interview, Pacquiao addressed the speculation that he would imminently retire from the sport of boxing: "I don't know. Let me rest first and relax and make a decision if I fight again." On August 25, Pacquiao said he was considering the idea of a January 2022 rematch against Ugás: "Yes, I can come back in January. I will see about it. I know I can rematch him if I want. I'll just need to tell Al Haymon. That would be no problem."

On September 29, Pacquiao officially announced his retirement from boxing in a post on social media.

== Fight card ==
Confirmed bouts:

Weight Class		vs.		Method	Round	Time	Notes
Welterweight	(Cuba) Yordenis Ugás (c)	def.	(Philippines) Manny Pacquiao	UD	12 (12)	3:00	^{Note 1}
Welterweight	(United States) Robert Guerrero	def.	(United States) Victor Ortiz	UD	10 (10)	3:00
Featherweight	(Philippines) Mark Magsayo (c)	def.	(Mexico) Julio Ceja	KO	10 (12)	0:50	^{Note 2}
Featherweight	(United States) Carlos Castro	def.	(Colombia) Óscar Escandón	TKO	10 (10)	1:08
Lightweight	(United States) Frank Martin	def.	(United States) Ryan Kielcweski	UD	10 (10)	3:00
Heavyweight	(United States) Steven Torres	def.	(United States) Justin Rolfe	TKO	1 (6)	2:33
Super Middleweight	(United States) Cameron Sevilla-Rivera	vs.	(United States) Burley Brooks	SD	6 (6)	3:00
Super Featherweight	(Mexico) Antonio Contreras	def.	(Philippines) John Leo Dato	UD	8 (8)	3:00
Lightweight	(United States) Mickel Clements	def.	(United States) Eliseo Villalobos	UD	4 (4)	3:00
Lightweight	(Mexico) Jose Valenzuela	def.	(United States) Donte Strayhorn	TKO	4 (8)	1:30

^Note 1 For WBA (Super) welterweight title
^Note 2 For WBC-title Eliminator & WBO International Featherweight title

== Broadcasting ==
Country/Region	Free-to-air	Cable/Satellite	Pay-per-view	Streaming
United States (host)	—N/a		Fox Sports	
Philippines	CNN Philippines^{1} GMA Network; TV5^{1} A2Z^{1}	Premier Football; Premier Tennis; TAP Sports; TAP Edge; Kapamilya Channel^{1}	KTX; Cignal; G Sat; SatLite; Sky Cable	TapGo; Upstream; WeTV Philippines; Cignal Play
United Kingdom	—N/a	Sky Sports Main Event	—N/a	Sky Sports Main Event
Ireland	—N/a	Sky Sports Main Event	—N/a	Sky Sports Main Event
Australia	—N/a		Main Event on Foxtel and Kayo	
Japan	—N/a	WOWOW Live	—N/a	WOWOW Live
Mexico	Box Azteca	—N/a		
Panama	Telemetro	—N/a		
Malaysia	—N/a	Astro Box Office Sport	—N/a	
Singapore	—N/a	Fight Sports	—N/a	
Indonesia	Indosiar	Fight Sports	—N/a	
Thailand	PPTV	—N/a		PPTV
International	—N/a		FITE TV iWantTFC^{2} TFC IPTV^{2}	

^1 simulcast from GMA Network
^2 outside Philippine territory only

Preceded by vs. Abel Ramos	Yordenis Ugás's bouts 21 August 2021	Succeeded by vs. Errol Spence Jr.
Preceded by vs. Keith Thurman	Manny Pacquiao's bouts 21 August 2021	Succeeded by vs. Mario Barrios
