= Genesis Servania =

Filipino boxer (born 1991)

Personal information
- Nicknames: Azukal; Kashimi
- Born: Genesis Llasos Servania; 15 August 1991 (age 35) Bacolod, Negros Occidental, Philippines
- Height: 5 ft 6.5 in (1.69 m)
- Weight: Super bantamweight; Featherweight; Super featherweight; Lightweight; Super lightweight; Welterweight

Boxing career
- Reach: 68 in (173 cm)
- Stance: Orthodox

Boxing record
- Total fights: 39
- Wins: 35
- Win by KO: 16
- Losses: 4

Genesis Llasos Servania (born August 15, 1991) is a Filipino professional boxer who challenged for the WBO featherweight title in 2017.

== Early life ==
As with many other boxers from the Philippines, Servania came from a poor family before arising into fame. His father was convicted in a crime earlier, and couldn't get a job. In return, his mother went out to sell fishes to provide the needs of their family. Eventually, Servania dropped out of school at the age of 15, and became a tricycle driver.

To earn more for living, Servania started joining local tournaments as an amateur boxer, and won few fights before turning pro. He was then introduced to Antonio L. Aldeguer of ALA Promotions.

== Professional career ==
Servania made his professional debut on February 21, 2009, at the age of 17, defeating Mike Espanosa via KO at the second round at PAGCOR Hotel and Casino, Goldenfield Commercial Complex, Bacolod City, Philippines.

On June 2, 2012, the then 20-year Servania, won the vacant WBC International Silver Super Bantamweight title via TKO, knocking-down a more experienced Mexican boxer Genaro 'Pablonito' García at the 12th round.

On his next fight held on August 18, 2012, Servania captured another belt, the vacant WBO Asia Pacific Super Bantamweight title against Jorge Pazos of Mexico via unanimous decision.

On October 26, 2013, during the Pinoy Pride XXII, Servania won the vacant WBO Inter-Continental Super Bantamweight title after knocking-out Panama's Rafael Concepción at the 2nd round.

During the Pinoy Pride XXVII held at Dubai World Trade Centre, Dubai, United Arab Emirates on September 5, 2014, Servania stopped the Mexican Jose 'Matador' Cabrera at the 10th round, and retained his WBO Intercontinental Super Bantamweight title.

On April 29, 2017, Genesis Servania stops Ralph Jhon Lulu in two rounds to claim the vacant WBO Asia Pacific Featherweight title in Japan.

On November 22, 2017, Servania had an exciting battle with Óscar Valdez for Valdez' WBO featherweight title, Servania lost via unanimous decision.

On February 10, 2019, Servania fell short against Carlos Castro for the vacant WBC Continental Americas super bantamweight title.

After a losing streak against Andres Cortes and Ryosuke Iwasa, Servania returns against Indonesian journeyman boxer Waldo Sabu, in November 2023 in Vietnam, initially, it was a professional bout, however, it was changed to an exhibition bout after Servania fails to make weight for the 135lbs limit, Servania defeated Sabu via 2nd-round KO.

== Professional boxing record ==
40 fights	35 wins	5 losses
By knockout	16	3
By decision	19	2

No.	Result	Record	Opponent	Type	Round, time	Date	Location	Notes
40	Loss	35–5	Aketelieti Yelejian	TKO	10 (12), 2:55	Feb 8, 2025	Nustar Resort and Casino, Cebu City, Philippines	For vacant WBO Oriental welterweight title
39	Win	35–4	Xiao Tao Su	UD	8	Mar 16, 2024	The Grand Ho Tram Strip, Vũng Tàu, Vietnam	
38	Loss	34–4	Ryosuke Iwasa	KO	4 (10), 1:46	Oct 25, 2021	Korakuen Hall, Tokyo, Japan	
37	Loss	34–3	Andres Cortes	KO	1 (8), 3:00	Aug 14, 2021	Hard Rock Hotel & Casino, Tulsa, Oklahoma, US	
36	Win	34–2	Pungluang Sor Singyu	TD	7 (10), 0:57	Dec 15, 2019	Sangyo Hall, Kanazawa, Japan	
35	Win	33–2	Ahmad Lahizab	TKO	1 (8), 2:07	Aug 24, 2019	Takeda Teva Ocean Arena, Nagoya, Japan	
34	Loss	32–2	Carlos Castro	UD	10	Feb 10, 2019	Save Mart Arena, Fresno, California, US	For vacant WBC Continental Americas super bantamweight title
33	Win	32–1	Carlos Carlson	KO	3 (8), 0:44	Sep 28, 2018	Oracle Arena, Oakland, California, US	
32	Win	31–1	Jason Butar Butar	KO	5 (8), 2:04	May 13, 2018	SM City North EDSA Skydome, Quezon City, Philippines	
31	Win	30–1	Kittiwat Sirichotchayakun	KO	1 (8), 0:37	Dec 17, 2017	Sangyo Hall, Kanazawa, Japan	
30	Loss	29–1	Óscar Valdez	UD	12	Sep 22, 2017	Convention Center, Tucson, Arizona, US	For WBO featherweight title
29	Win	29–0	Ralph Jhon Lulu	TKO	2 (12), 2:40	Apr 29, 2017	Sangyo Hall, Kanazawa, Japan	Won vacant WBO Asia Pacific featherweight title
28	Win	28–0	Alexander Espinoza	UD	8	Sep 11, 2016	Sangyo Hall, Kanazawa, Japan	
27	Win	27–0	Hendrik Barongsay	UD	8	Dec 31, 2015	Aichi Prefectural Gym, Nagoya, Japan	
26	Win	26–0	Juan Luis Hernandez	UD	12	Feb 7, 2015	University of SouthEastern Philippines Gym, Barrio Obrero, Davao City, Philippines	Retained WBO Inter-Continental super bantamweight title
25	Win	25–0	José Cabrera	RTD	10 (12), 3:00	Sep 5, 2014	World Trade Centre, Dubai, UAE	Retained WBO Inter-Continental super bantamweight title
24	Win	24–0	Alexander Muñoz	TKO	12 (12), 2:22	Mar 1, 2014	Solaire Resort Hotel and Casino, Paranaque City, Philippines	Retained WBO Inter-Continental super bantamweight title
23	Win	23–0	Rafael Concepción	TKO	2 (12), 2:02	Oct 26, 2013	Cebu City Waterfront Hotel & Casino, Barangay Lahug, Cebu City, Philippines	Won vacant WBO Inter-Continental super bantamweight title
22	Win	22–0	Konosuke Tomiyama	TD	9 (10), 1:42	Jul 27, 2013	Cotai Arena, Venetian Resort, Macau, SAR	Retained WBO Asia Pacific super bantamweight title
21	Win	21–0	Isack Junior	KO	3 (10), 2:15	May 25, 2013	Cebu City Waterfront Hotel & Casino, Barangay Lahug, Cebu City, Philippines	
20	Win	20–0	Angky Angkotta	TKO	7 (12), 2:59	Mar 2, 2013	Cebu City Waterfront Hotel & Casino, Barangay Lahug, Cebu City, Philippines	Retained WBO Asia Pacific super bantamweight title
19	Win	19–0	Jorge Pazos	UD	12	Aug 18, 2012	Cebu City Waterfront Hotel & Casino, Barangay Lahug, Cebu City, Philippines	Won vacant WBO Asia Pacific super bantamweight title
18	Win	18–0	Genaro García	TKO	12 (12), 2:02	Jun 2, 2012	Resorts World Hotel, Newport Performing Arts Theatre, Pasay City, Philippines	Won vacant WBC International Silver super bantamweight title
17	Win	17–0	Nick Otieno	UD	10	Mar 3, 2012	Carlos P. Garcia Sports Complex, Tagbilaran City, Philippines	
16	Win	16–0	Marcos Cardenas	UD	10	Dec 10, 2011	Hoops Dome, Lapu-Lapu City, Philippines	
15	Win	15–0	Gerson Guerrero	UD	8	Sep 10, 2011	Cebu City Waterfront Hotel & Casino, Barangay Lahug, Cebu City, Philippines	
14	Win	14–0	Richard Donaire	TKO	2 (8), 1:18	Jun 11, 2011	Cebu City Waterfront Hotel & Casino, Barangay Lahug, Cebu City, Philippines	
13	Win	13–0	Prell Tupas	RTD	4 (10), 3:00	Apr 8, 2011	888 Chinatown Square Mall, Bacolod City, Philippines	
12	Win	12–0	Renan Branzuela	UD	10	Feb 27, 2011	Magsaysay Park, Davao City, Philippines	
11	Win	11–0	Alvin Makiling	UD	10	Nov 20, 2010	Island City Mall, Tagbilaran City, Philippines	
10	Win	10–0	Dunryl Marcos	UD	10	Aug 21, 2010	Oval Plaza Covered Court, General Santos City, Philippines	
9	Win	9–0	Jestoni Pepito	UD	8	Jul 24, 2010	Gaisano Country Mall Parking Lot, Barangay Banilad, Cebu City, Philippines	
8	Win	8–0	Jog Alim	UD	8	Apr 24, 2010	Negros Occidental Provincial Capital grounds, Bacolod City, Philippines	
7	Win	7–0	Jun Piacidad	UD	8	Feb 5, 2010	Barangay Del Monte, Quezon City, Philippines	
6	Win	6–0	Melchor Abcede	KO	6 (6), 0:27	Nov 14, 2009	YMCA Gym, Iloilo City, Philippines	
5	Win	5–0	Jomar Cabusas	UD	6	Aug 29, 2009	PAGCOR Hotel and Casino, Bacolod City, Goldenfield Commercial Complex, Philippines	
4	Win	4–0	Joseph Altieza	TKO	1 (6), 2:38	Jul 11, 2009	PAGCOR Hotel and Casino, Bacolod City, Goldenfield Commercial Complex, Philippines	
3	Win	3–0	Mar Nonescan	TD	4 (4), 2:25	May 30, 2009	PAGCOR Hotel and Casino, Bacolod City, Goldenfield Commercial Complex, Philippines	
2	Win	2–0	Powell Balaba	UD	4	Mar 21, 2009	Negros Occidental Multi-Purpose Activity Center (Nompac), Bacolod City, Philippines	
1	Win	1–0	Mike Espanosa	KO	2 (4), 2:19	Feb 21, 2009	PAGCOR Hotel and Casino, Bacolod City, Goldenfield Commercial Complex, Philippines	

== Exhibition boxing record ==
3 fights	1 win	0 losses
By knockout	1	0
Non-scored	2	

No.	Result	Record	Opponent	Type	Round, time	Date	Location	Notes
3	Win	1–0 (2)	Waldo Sabu	KO	2 (8), 1:08	Nov 19, 2023	The Grand Ho Tram Strip, Vũng Tàu, Vietnam	Initially a professional bout but was later changed to an exhibition match after Servania misses weight
2	—N/a	0–0 (2)	Naoya Inoue	—N/a	3	Aug 19, 2018	Sangyo Hall, Kanazawa, Japan	Non-scored bout
1	—N/a	0–0 (1)	Naoya Inoue	—N/a	3	Jul 3, 2016	Happiring, Fukui, Japan	Non-scored bout

== Regional and minor titles ==
- WBO Asia Pacific Featherweight Title (April 2017)
- WBO Inter-Continental Super Bantamweight Title (October 2013)
- WBO Asia Pacific Super Bantamweight Title (August 2012)
- WBC International Silver Super Bantamweight Title (June 2012)

== See also ==
- List of Filipino boxing world champions
- List of WBO world champions
- List of super-bantamweight boxing champions
- 2014 in Philippine sports
- 2015 in Philippine sports
- List of Philippine television specials aired in 2014
