= Daniel Roman (boxer) =

American boxer (born 1990)

Personal information
- Nickname: The Baby Faced Assassin
- Born: Daniel Roman; May 10, 1990 (age 36) Los Angeles, California, U.S.
- Height: 5 ft 5 in (165 cm)
- Weight: Super bantamweight

Boxing career
- Reach: 68 in (173 cm)
- Stance: Orthodox

Boxing record
- Total fights: 34
- Wins: 29
- Win by KO: 10
- Losses: 4
- Draws: 1

Daniel "Danny" Roman (born May 10, 1990) is an American professional boxer. He is a former unified super bantamweight champion, having held the WBA and IBF titles from 2019 to 2020, and previously he held the WBA (Regular) super bantamweight title from 2017 to 2019.

== Professional career ==
=== Early career ===
Roman made his professional debut against Christian Cruz on October 8, 2010. He won the fight by a first-round technical knockout. Roman amassed a 15-2-1 record during the next five years, with five stoppage victories, before being scheduled to fight Daniel Noriega for the vacant WBA-NABA super bantamweight title on July 24, 2015. He won the fight by unanimous decision. Roman made his first title defense against Erik Ruiz on September 25, 2015. He won the fight by unanimous decision. Roman made his second title defense against Ramiro Robles on February 12, 2016. He won the fight by a fifth-round knockout, which was his first stoppage victory since August 16, 2014. Rooman was booked to make his third title defense against Christian Esquivel on May 20, 2016. He once again won the fight by a fifth-round knockout. Roman made his fourth and final WBA NABA title defense against Enrique Quevedo on August 26, 2016. He won the fight by unanimous decision.

Roman was booked to face Marlon Olea in a non-title bout on November 18, 2016. He won the fight by unanimous decision. His 13-fight winning streak earned Roman the right to fight Adam Lopez in a title eliminator bout for the WBA (Regular) super bantamweight title. His fight with Lopez was scheduled for January 20, 2017, and took place at the Bally's Atlantic City in Atlantic City, New Jersey. Lopez retired from the fight at the end of the ninth round.

=== WBA super bantamweight champion ===
==== Roman vs. Kubo ====
Roman was booked to challenge the reigning WBA "World" super-bantamweight champion in the latter's first title defense. The bout was booked for September 3, 2017, as the main event of Showtime's "ShoBox: The New Generation", and took place at the Shimadzu Arena in Kyoto, Japan. Although Kubo was seen as a significant step-up in competition for Roman, and despite the fight taking place in Kubo's hometown, Roman entered the fight as a slight 8/11 favorite to win. Roman won the fight by a dominant ninth-round technical knockout. Roman dropped and cut Kubo above the left eye thirty seconds into the seventh round. He followed this up by knocking Kubo down with a straight right near the end of the eight round. Kubo flagged in the ninth round, and failed to respond to Roman's flurry of punches, which prompted referee Pinit Prayadsab to stop the fight.

==== Roman vs. Matsumoto ====
On December 19, 2017, it was announced that Roman would make his first world title defense against the #13 ranked WBA super-bantamweight contender Ryo Matsumoto. The bout was scheduled as the main event of a card which took place at the Korakuen Hall in Tokyo, Japan. Roman won the fight by a wide unanimous decision, with two judges awarding him a 119-109 scorecard, while the third judge scored it 118-110 for Roman.

==== Roman vs. Flores ====
On March 17, 2018, the WBA ordered Roman to make his second title defense against the undefeated Moises Flores, and gave both parties 30 days to negotiate the terms of the fight. The fight was officially announced for June 16, 2018, as the co-featured bout for an IBF world welterweight title fight between Errol Spence Jr. and Carlos Ocampo. Roman came into the fight as a -800 favorite, while most odds-makers had Flores as a +575 underdog. Flores came in heavy at 123 lbs, two pounds above the super bantamweight limit. Roman won the fight by a lopsided unanimous decision, with scores of 120-108, 118-110 and 116-110.

==== Roman vs. McDonnell ====
Roman was booked to make his third title defense against Gavin McDonnell on October 6, 2018. The bout took place at the Wintrust Arena in Chicago, Illinois, and was broadcast by DAZN. Roman was a smaller favorite compared to his previous title fights, with most odds-makers having him a -285 favorite and McDonnell a +245 underdog. Roman won the fight by a tenth-round technical knockout. He staggered McDonnell with a right, before flooring him with a flurry of punches. McDonnell was able to beat the ten count, but was unsteady on his feet, which promoted referee Mark Nelson to wave the fight off. Roman was leading on the scorecards at the time of the stoppage, with scores of 86-85, 89-82 and 86-85.

=== Unified super bantamweight champion ===
==== Roman vs. Doheny ====
On January 18, 2019, Roman joined IBF super bantamweight champion T. J. Doheny in the ring, following Doheny's victory against Ryohei Takahashi. The two agreed on a title unification bout later in the year, with Roman stating: "From champion to champion, let’s give the best fight and let the best win". The fight was officially announced for April 26, 2019, to take place at The Forum in Inglewood, California, and to be broadcast by DAZN and Sky Sports. Roman entered the fight as a -700 favorite. He justified his role as the favorite, as he won the fight by majority decision. Two of the judges scored the fight 116-110 in his favor, while the third judge scored it as an even 113-113 draw. Roman knocked Doheny down twice, with a left hook in the second round and a body strike in the eleventh round. He out-landed Doheny 195 to 174 in total punches and 150 to 127 in power punches landed.

==== Roman vs. Akhmadaliev ====
Roman was booked to make the first defense of his unified WBA and IBF super bantamweight titles against mandatory WBA title challenger Murodjon Akhmadaliev. Akhmadaliev was ranked #1 by the WBA at super bantamweight. The fight was scheduled as the co-featured bout of a DAZN broadcast card, which took place on January 20, 2020, at the Meridian at Island Gardens in Miami, Florida. Roman entered a title fight as an underdog for the first time in his career, as most odds-makers had him as a +195 underdog and Akhmadaliev as a -225 favorite. Akhmadaliev won the fight by a controversial split decision. Two of the judges scored the fight 115-113 for Akhmadaliev, while the third judge awarded the same scorecard to Roman. Roman demanded an immediate rematch in a later interview, stating: "I want a rematch because I think I won the fight". Roman earned a reported $500 000, while Akhmadaliev earned a reported $100 000.

=== Continued super bantamweight career ===
==== Roman vs. Payano ====
Roman was scheduled to face Juan Carlos Payano on the undercard of The Charlos vs. Derevyanchenko and Rosario on September 26, 2020. Roman returned to his usual role of the favorite, as he entered the fight a -1781 pick to win. Roman won the fight by unanimous decision, with all three judges scoring the fight 116-112 in his favor.

==== Roman vs. Franco ====
Roman was booked to face Ricardo Espinoza Franco on May 15, 2021. Franco was ranked #7 by the WBO and #14 by the IBF at super bantamweight. He justified his role as the betting favorite, as he won the fight by unanimous decision. Two of the judges scored the fight 98-92 for him, while the third judge scored it 97-93 for Roman.

==== Roman vs. Fulton ====
Roman challenged unified WBO and WBC super bantamweight champion Stephen Fulton at Minneapolis Armory in Minneapolis, Minnesota, on June 4, 2022. He lost the fight by a dominant unanimous decision, with two judges scoring all twelve rounds for his opponent, while the third judge awarded him one round. on August 30, 2022, Roman announced his retirement from boxing.

== Professional boxing record ==
34 fights	29 wins	4 losses
By knockout	10	0
By decision	19	4
Draws	1	

No.	Result	Record	Opponent	Type	Round, time	Date	Location	Notes
34	Loss	29–4–1	Stephen Fulton	UD	12	Jun 4, 2022	Minneapolis Armory, Minneapolis, Minnesota, U.S.	For WBC and WBO super bantamweight titles
33	Win	29–3–1	Ricardo Espinoza Franco	UD	10	May 15, 2021	Dignity Health Sports Park, Carson, California, U.S.	
32	Win	28–3–1	Juan Carlos Payano	UD	12	Sep 26, 2020	Mohegan Sun Arena, Montville, Connecticut, U.S.	
31	Loss	27–3–1	Murodjon Akhmadaliev	SD	12	Jan 30, 2020	Meridian at Island Gardens, Miami, Florida, U.S.	Lost WBA (Unified) and IBF super bantamweight titles
30	Win	27–2–1	TJ Doheny	MD	12	Apr 26, 2019	The Forum, Inglewood, California, U.S.	Retained WBA (Unified) super bantamweight title; Won IBF super bantamweight title
29	Win	26–2–1	Gavin McDonnell	TKO	10 (12) 2:36	Oct 6, 2018	Wintrust Arena, Chicago, Illinois, U.S.	Retained WBA super bantamweight title
28	Win	25–2–1	Moises Flores	UD	12	Jun 16, 2018	The Ford Center at The Star, Frisco, Texas, U.S.	Retained WBA super bantamweight title
27	Win	24–2–1	Ryo Matsumoto	UD	12	Feb 28, 2018	Korakuen Hall, Tokyo, Japan	Retained WBA super bantamweight title
26	Win	23–2–1	Shun Kubo	TKO	9 (12) 1:21	Sep 3, 2017	Shimadzu Arena, Kyoto, Japan	Won WBA (Regular) super bantamweight title
25	Win	22–2–1	Adam Lopez	RTD	9 (12), 3:00	Jan 20, 2017	Bally's, Atlantic City, New Jersey, U.S.	
24	Win	21–2–1	Marlon Olea	UD	8	Nov 18, 2016	Doubletree Hotel, Ontario, California, U.S.	
23	Win	20–2–1	Enrique Quevedo	UD	10	Aug 26, 2016	Omega Products International, Corona, California, U.S.	Retained WBA-NABA super bantamweight title
22	Win	19–2–1	Christian Esquivel	KO	5 (10) 1:52	May 20, 2016	Doubletree Hotel, Ontario, California, U.S.	Retained WBA-NABA super bantamweight title
21	Win	18–2–1	Ramiro Robles	KO	5 (10) 1:55	Feb 12, 2016	Doubletree Hotel, Ontario, California, U.S.	Retained WBA-NABA super bantamweight title
20	Win	17–2–1	Erik Ruiz	UD	10	Sep 25, 2015	Doubletree Hotel, Ontario, California, U.S.	Retained WBA-NABA super bantamweight title
19	Win	16–2–1	Daniel Noriega	UD	10	Jul 24, 2015	Doubletree Hotel, Ontario, California, U.S.	Won vacant WBA-NABA super bantamweight title
18	Win	15–2–1	Christopher Martin	UD	8	May 29, 2015	Doubletree Hotel, Ontario, California, U.S.	
17	Win	14–2–1	Giovanni Caro	UD	8	Apr 24, 2015	Doubletree Hotel, Ontario, California, U.S.	
16	Win	13–2–1	Jose Miguel Tamayo	UD	8	Mar 13, 2015	Marconi Automative Museum, Tustin, California, U.S.	
15	Win	12–2–1	Jonathan Alcantara	UD	8	Sep 26, 2014	Doubletree Hotel, Ontario, California, U.S.	
14	Win	11–2–1	Pedro Melo	RTD	2 (8), 3:00	Aug 16, 2014	Harley Davidson San Diego, San Diego, California, U.S.	
13	Win	10–2–1	Jonathan Arrellano	UD	8	Jun 27, 2014	Doubletree Hotel, Ontario, California, U.S.	
12	Win	9–2–1	Jose Angel Cota	KO	2 (6) 1:48	Mar 15, 2014	Doubletree Hotel, Ontario, California, U.S.	
11	Loss	8–2–1	Juan Reyes	UD	8	Oct 18, 2013	Doubletree Hotel, Ontario, California, U.S.	
10	Win	8–1–1	Jose Iniguez	KO	2 (6) 2:56	Aug 23, 2013	Omega Products International, Corona, California, U.S.	
9	Win	7–1–1	Manuel Rubalcava	UD	4	Jun 28, 2013	Doubletree Hotel, Ontario, California, U.S.	
8	Win	6–1–1	Francisco Camacho	UD	4	Apr 26, 2013	Doubletree Hotel, Ontario, California, U.S.	
7	Win	5–1–1	Juan Gomez Torres	UD	4	Oct 27, 2012	Gimnasio Eufrasio Santana, Tecate, Mexico	
6	Win	4–1–1	Juan Sandoval	UD	4	Aug 24, 2012	Omega Products International, Corona, California, U.S.	
5	Win	3–1–1	Jesse Adame	TKO	4 (4) 2:09	Mar 31, 2012	Warner Center Marriott, Los Angeles, California, U.S.	
4	Loss	2–1–1	Takashi Okada	SD	4	Jul 22, 2011	Doubletree Hotel, Ontario, California, U.S.	
3	Win	2–0–1	Alfredo Madrigal	UD	4	May 13, 2011	Chumash Casino Resort, Santa Ynez, California, U.S.	
2	Draw	1–0–1	Jensen Ramirez	SD	4	Feb 24, 2011	Orange County Fairgrounds, Costa Mesa, California, U.S.	
1	Win	1–0	Christian Cruz	TKO	1 (4) 0:43	Oct 8, 2010	Doubletree Hotel, Ontario, California, U.S.	

== See also ==
- List of world super-bantamweight boxing champions
- List of Mexican boxing world champions

Sporting positions
World boxing titles
Preceded by Shun Kubo	WBA super-bantamweight champion Regular title September 3, 2017 – December 9, 2017; Promoted	Vacant Title next held by Brandon Figueroa
Vacant Title last held by Guillermo Rigondeaux	WBA super-bantamweight champion December 9, 2017 – April 26, 2019; Promoted	Succeeded by Himself as Unified champion
Preceded by T. J. Doheny	IBF super-bantamweight champion April 26, 2019 – January 30, 2020	Succeeded by Murodjon Akhmadaliev
Preceded by Himself as Champion	WBA super-bantamweight champion Unified title April 26, 2019 – January 30, 2020	Succeeded by Murodjon Akhmadaliev
