= Pharr Events Center =

Indoor arena in Pharr, Texas

Pharr Events Center (formerly known as the Boggus Ford Events Center) is a 2,500-seat indoor arena located in Pharr, Texas. It is used primarily for boxing and wrestling, but is also used as a concert venue, with standing room bringing the capacity to 3,500. There is parking for 600 cars, plus a 60-by-35-foot performance stage. It was originally built as a convention center.
