= Germán Meraz =

Mexican boxer

Personal information
- Born: Germán Iván Meraz Lima; 19 June 1986 (age 40) Agua Prieta, Sonora, Mexico
- Height: 1.68 m (5 ft 6 in)
- Weight: Flyweight; Super flyweight; Bantamweight; Super bantamweight

Boxing career
- Reach: 167 cm (66 in)
- Stance: Orthodox

Boxing record
- Total fights: 141
- Wins: 65
- Win by KO: 41
- Losses: 72
- Draws: 3
- No contests: 1

Germán Iván Meraz Lima (born 19 June 1986) is a Mexican professional boxer.

== NABF title fights ==
Meraz has twice fought for the NABF title - losing in a bid for the bantamweight title to Tomoki Kameda and losing in a bid for the super flyweight title to José Salgado Fernández.

== Other notable opponents ==
Meraz is one of three fighters to have gone the distance with Gervonta Davis and also gone the distance with other notable fighters like Rau'shee Warren and Juan Carlos Payano. He has been stopped by Juan Francisco Estrada, Hugo Ruiz and Tugstsogt Nyambayar.
