= Dignity Health Sports Park (tennis) =

Tennis center in Carson, California, Los Angeles

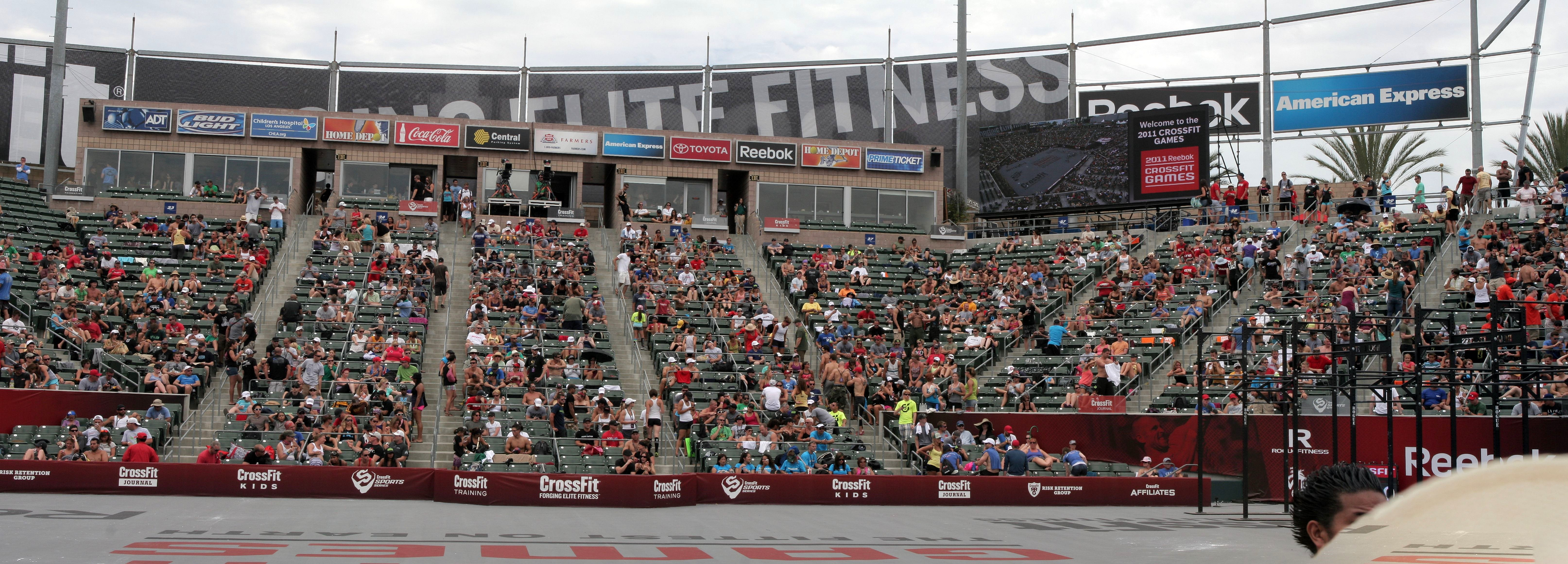
- 2011 CrossFit Games
- Interactive map of Dignity Health Sports Park
- Former names: The Home Depot Center; StubHub Center
- Location: Carson, Los Angeles, California, United States
- Coordinates: 33.8625226°N 118.2610953°W
- Capacity: 8,000 (tennis); 9,000 (boxing)

Construction
- Groundbreaking: 2002
- Opened: June 2003
- Cost: $150 million (full complex)
- Architect: Rossetti Architects

Tenants
- LA Women's Tennis Championships (Tennis) (2009–2010); Davis Cup (USA vs Croatia), March 2005

The Dignity Health Sports Park is a tennis center in Carson, Los Angeles, California, United States. It is adjacent to the soccer stadium of the same name, which is home to the LA Galaxy of Major League Soccer (MLS).

The venue hosted the LA Women's Tennis Championships, a WTA Premier tournament, from 2003 to 2009. During the 2028 Summer Olympics, the venue will host the tennis competition. The following month the venue will host wheelchair tennis at the 2028 Summer Paralympics.

The record capacity is 11,168, set on May 17, 2016, for a Bernie Sanders campaign rally.

In 2019, Dignity Health purchased the naming rights to the venue.

In addition, many other events such as Crossfit, beach volleyball, and boxing matches have been hosted in the tennis stadium.

== See also ==
- List of tennis stadiums by capacity
