= Diego de la Hoya =

Mexican boxer (born 1994)

Personal information
- Nickname: Golden Kid
- Born: Diego de la Hoya Villegas; August 13, 1994 (age 32) Mexicali, Baja California, Mexico
- Height: 5 ft 6 in (168 cm)
- Weight: Super bantamweight

Boxing career
- Reach: 68 in (173 cm)
- Stance: Orthodox

Boxing record
- Total fights: 27
- Wins: 24
- Win by KO: 11
- Losses: 2
- No contests: 1

Diego de la Hoya Villegas (born August 13, 1994) is a Mexican professional boxer who held the WBC-NABF and WBO-NABO super bantamweight titles between 2017 and 2019. As an amateur he represented Mexico, winning the 2011 Mexican National Championships and competing at the 2012 Youth World Championships. He is the cousin of former boxer Oscar De La Hoya.

== Early life ==
De la Hoya was born in the Mexican border town of Mexicali, in a boxing family, and was surrounded by boxing ever since he was born. He is said to have fallen in love with the sport of boxing at the age of 6, although he had been boxing even before that. As his interest in the sport grew, he decided to take up boxing full-time at the age of 15. Growing up he idolized Mexican boxing legends Julio Cesar Chavez, and his cousin Oscar De La Hoya. De la Hoya lives with his parents and loves playing soccer.

== Amateur career ==
Diego joined the Mexican National Boxing team in 2009. De la Hoya had over 250 amateur bouts and was a Mexican National Olympics silver medalist.

== Professional career ==
Diego is signed to Oscar De La Hoya's Golden Boy Promotions. He made his professional debut on September 12, 2013, in Las Vegas, Nevada against Luis Cosme who had already had eleven professional fights. De La Hoya won the fight via technical knockout (TKO) at 1:53 min in the third round.

The second fight was in the city of Indio, California on December 13, 2013. De La Hoya won the fight via TKO at 2:32 minutes in the first round against Abraham Rubio who had already had six professional fights.

De La Hoya fought his third fight on March 14, 2014, and won in a first round stoppage, bringing his record to 3–0.

De La Hoya won his fourth fight on April 3, again in the Fantasy Springs Casino in Indio, California. "The Golden Kid" won by unanimous decision (UD) in six rounds against Puerto Rican Jaxel Marrero. He won his next four fights with three coming by way of TKO.

On September 4, 2015, De La Hoya stepped up and faced Jesus Ruiz, who had earlier that year lost to Leo Santa Cruz in a world title fight. De La Hoya won the fight via UD (100–90, 100–90, 99–91).

On the undercard of Canelo Álvarez vs. Amir Khan, De La Hoya faced undefeated Rocco Santomauro. He successfully defended his WBC Youth title when Santomauro's trainer Shane Mosley threw in the towel in the seventh round.

De La Hoya defeated former IBF bantamweight champion Randy Caballero on September 16, 2017, on the undercard of Canelo Álvarez vs. Gennady Golovkin.

He also won his next fight against José Salgado via a seventh-round TKO. De la Hoya was the constant aggressor which prompted Salgado's team to throw in the towel.

On April 13, 2019, had his first fight at featherweight against Enrique Bernache. An accidental head clash caused a bad cut on Bernache's forehead, which led to the fight being stopped and ruled as a no-contest.

On July 13, 2019, Diego, then ranked #3 by the WBA at super bantamweight, faced Ronny Rios, ranked #8 by the WBA at the Dignity Health Sports Park in California. De la Hoya got into the fight as the favorite, however, Rios managed to drop De la Hoya, who despite beating the count, could not continue fighting. This was Diego's first loss as a professional.

He then battled veteran Renson Robles in his hometown of Mexicali to a ten-round UD win. De la Hoya stated after the fight that he had injured his left hand during the second round.

== Professional boxing record ==
27 fights	24 wins	2 losses
By knockout	11	2
By decision	13	0
No contests	1	

No.	Result	Record	Opponent	Type	Round, time	Date	Location	Notes
27	Loss	24–2 (1)	Victor Morales	KO	2 (10), 1:08	April 29, 2023	College Park Center, Arlington, Texas, U.S.	For vacant WBA Inter-Continental featherweight title
26	Win	24–1 (1)	Jose Santos Gonzalez	TD	8 (10), 1:16	Dec 17, 2022	Commerce Casino, Commerce, California, U.S.	
25	Win	23–1 (1)	Enrique Bernache	KO	4 (10), 2:51	Jul 16, 2022	Crypto Arena, Los Angeles, California, U.S.	
24	Win	22–1 (1)	Renson Robles	UD	10	Dec 14, 2019	Auditorio del Estado, Mexicali, Mexico	
23	Loss	21–1 (1)	Ronny Rios	KO	6 (12), 1:17	Jul 13, 2019	Dignity Health Sports Park, Carson, California, U.S.	Lost WBC-NABF super bantamweight title; For inaugural WBA Gold super bantamweight title
22	NC	21–0 (1)	Enrique Bernache	NC	2 (10), 2:25	Apr 13, 2019	Arena Monterrey, Monterrey, Mexico	Accidental headbutt left Bernache unable to continue
21	Win	21–0	Jose Salgado	RTD	7 (10), 3:00	June 8, 2018	Turning Stone Resort & Casino, Verona, New York, U.S.	Retained WBC-NABF and WBO-NABO super bantamweight titles
20	Win	20–0	Randy Caballero	UD	10	Sep 16, 2017	T-Mobile Arena, Paradise, Nevada, U.S.	Won WBC-NABF and vacant WBO-NABO super bantamweight titles
19	Win	19–0	Alan Isaias Luques Castillo	UD	10	Jul 1, 2017	Parque La Pedrera, Villa Mercedes, Argentina	Retained WBC youth super bantamweight title
18	Win	18–0	Erik Ruiz	UD	10	May 19, 2017	Casino del Sol, Tucson, Arizona, U.S.	
17	Win	17–0	Roberto Pucheta	UD	8	Mar 11, 2017	Turning Stone Resort & Casino, Verona, New York, U.S.	
16	Win	16–0	Luis Del Valle	UD	10	Sep 17, 2016	AT&T Stadium, Arlington, Texas, U.S.	Retained WBC youth super bantamweight title
15	Win	15–0	Rocco Santomauro	TKO	7 (8), 1:59	May 7, 2016	T-Mobile Arena, Paradise, Nevada, U.S.	Retained WBC youth super bantamweight title
14	Win	14–0	Arturo Badillo	TKO	4 (8), 1:11	Feb 19, 2016	Belasco Theater, Los Angeles, California, U.S.	
13	Win	13–0	Giovanni Delgado	UD	8	Nov 20, 2015	Hard Rock Hotel & Casino, Las Vegas, Nevada, U.S.	
12	Win	12–0	Jesus Ruiz	UD	10	Sep 4, 2015	Belasco Theater, Los Angeles, California, U.S.	Won WBC youth super bantamweight title
11	Win	11–0	Jose Estrella	KO	4 (8), 2:36	Jul 2, 2015	Belasco Theater, Los Angeles, California, U.S.	
10	Win	10–0	Ramiro Robles	UD	8	May 7, 2015	Belasco Theater, Los Angeles, California, U.S.	
9	Win	9–0	Manuel Roman	UD	8	Feb 27, 2015	Fantasy Springs Casino, Indio, California, U.S.	
8	Win	8–0	Ali Gonzalez	TKO	5 (6), 1:40	Nov 13, 2014	Fantasy Springs Casino, Indio, California, U.S.	
7	Win	7–0	Luis Ruiz Lizarraga Jr	UD	6	Oct 10, 2014	Fantasy Springs Casino, Indio, California, U.S.	
6	Win	6–0	Miguel Tamayo	TKO	5 (6), 2:27	Jul 9, 2014	Hard Rock Hotel & Casino, Las Vegas, Nevada, U.S.	
5	Win	5–0	Rigoberto Casillas	TKO	3 (6), 0:28	June 6, 2014	Fantasy Springs Casino, Indio, California, U.S.	
4	Win	4–0	Jaxel Marrero	UD	6	Apr 13, 2014	Fantasy Springs Casino, Indio, California, U.S.	
3	Win	3–0	Sergio Najera	TKO	1 (4), 2:14	Feb 17, 2014	Salinas Storm House, Salinas, California, U.S.	
2	Win	2–0	Abraham Rubio	TKO	1 (4), 2:32	Dec 13, 2013	Fantasy Springs Casino, Indio, California, U.S.	
1	Win	1–0	Luis Cosme	TKO	3 (4), 1:53	Sep 12, 2013	MGM Grand Garden Arena, Paradise, Nevada, U.S.	

Achievements
Preceded by Randy Caballero	NABF super bantamweight champion September 16, 2017 – July 13, 2019	Succeeded by Ronny Rios
