= Randy Caballero =

American boxer

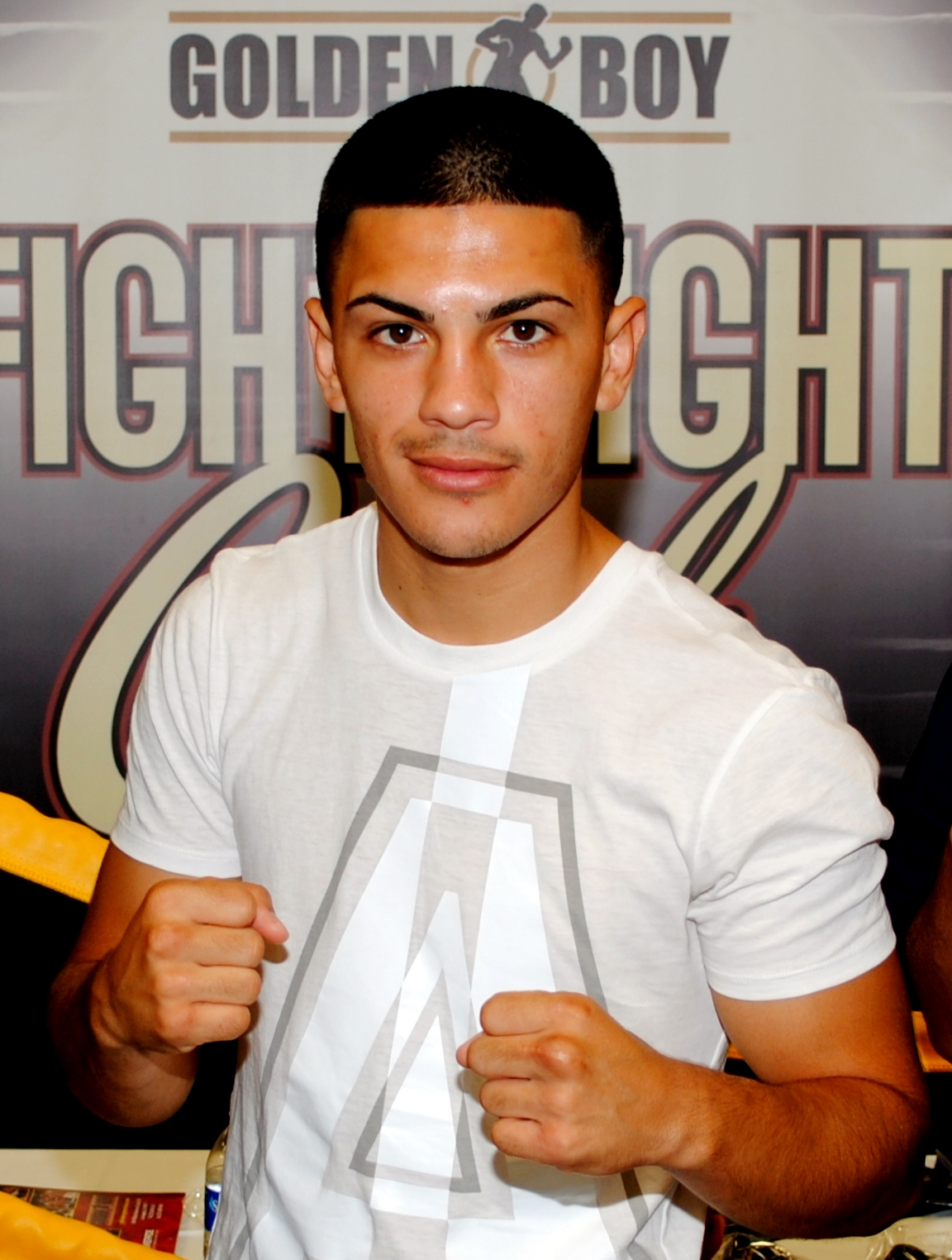
- Caballero in 2011

Personal information
- Nationality: American
- Born: Randy Michaels Caballero; September 27, 1990 (age 36) Indio, California, U.S.
- Height: 5 ft 5 in (165 cm)
- Weight: Bantamweight; Super bantamweight

Boxing career
- Reach: 68 in (173 cm)
- Stance: Orthodox

Boxing record
- Total fights: 25
- Wins: 24
- Win by KO: 14
- Losses: 1

Randy Michaels Caballero (born September 27, 1990) is a Nicaraguan American professional boxer in the Bantamweight division. Caballero is a former IBF Bantamweight world champion, nicknamed El Madator. He lost his title on the scales after being 5 pounds overweight before a scheduled mandatory defence against Lee Haskins.

== Amateur career ==
Caballero is a nine-time amateur champion, which includes a win at the 2008 U.S. National Amateur Champion, with an amateur record of 167-10. He also won a Bronze medal at 2006 Cadet World Championships in Istanbul, Turkey and he missed out on the 2008 Olympic qualifying because he was too young.

== Professional career ==
On March 25, 2010, Caballero won his professional debut against Gonzalo Nicolas.

In July 2011, Caballero beat the undefeated Alexis Santiago to win his first title, the WBC Youth Intercontinental Super Bantamweight Championship.

== IBF World bantamweight title ==
On October 25, 2014, he defeated Stuart Hall in Monte Carlo to claim the vacant IBF bantamweight title.

== Professional boxing record ==
=== Caballero vs. Garcia ===
On February 5, 2016, Caballero fought and defeated Ruben Garcia via a seventh round TKO.

=== Caballero vs. De La Hoya ===
On September 16, 2017, Caballero fought Diego De La Hoya. De La Hoya won the fight convincingly on the scorecards, 100-90, 98-92 and 98-92.

== Professional boxing record ==
25 fights	24 wins	1 loss
By knockout	14	0
By decision	10	1

No.	Result	Record	Opponent	Type	Round, time	Date	Location	Notes
25	Loss	24–1	(Mexico) Diego De La Hoya	UD	10	2017-09-16	(United States) T-Mobile Arena, Paradise, Nevada	Lost WBC-NABF super bantamweight title
24	Win	24–0	(Mexico) Jesus Ruiz	UD	10	2017-03-23	(United States) Fantasy Springs Casino, California	Won vacant WBC-NABF super bantamweight title
23	Win	23–0	(Mexico) Ruben Garcia	TKO	7 (12),	2016-02-05	(United States) Fantasy Springs Casino, Indio, California	
22	Win	22–0	(United Kingdom) Stuart Hall	UD	12	2014-10-25	(Monaco) Salle des Étoiles, Monte Carlo	Won vacant IBF bantamweight title
21	Win	21–0	(Japan) Kohei Oba	TKO	8 (12), 1:54	2014-04-04	(Japan) Central Gym, Kobe	
20	Win	20–0	(United States) Jessy Cruz	TKO	7 (10), 2:52	2013-11-26	(United States) BB&T Center, Sunrise, Florida	
19	Win	19–0	(Puerto Rico) Miguel Robles	KO	7 (10), 2:09	2013-07-20	(United States) Fantasy Springs Resort Casino, Indio, California	Retained WBO-NABO bantamweight title
18	Win	18–0	(Mexico) Luis Maldonado	TKO	4 (10), 0:39	2013-01-11	(United States) Fantasy Springs Resort Casino, Indio, California	
17	Win	17–0	(Mexico) Rigoberto Casillas	RTD	3 (8), 3:00	2012-11-24	(United States) Citizens Business Bank Arena, Ontario, California	
16	Win	16–0	(Mexico) Manuel Roman	UD	10	2012-08-24	(United States) Fantasy Springs Resort Casino, Indio, California	Retained WBO-NABO bantamweight title
15	Win	15–0	(United States) Jamal Parram	TKO	5 (8), 1:50	2012-06-23	(United States) Staples Center, Los Angeles, California	
14	Win	14–0	(Mexico) Jose Luis Araiza	UD	10	2012-03-16	(United States) Fantasy Springs Resort Casino, Indio, California	Won vacant WBO-NABO bantamweight title
13	Win	13–0	(Puerto Rico) Arturo Santiago	UD	8	2011-12-02	(United States) Fantasy Springs Resort Casino, Indio, California	Retained WBC Youth bantamweight title
12	Win	12–0	(United States) Alexis Santiago	UD	8	2011-07-01	(United States) Fantasy Springs Resort Casino, Indio, California	Won vacant WBC Youth bantamweight title
11	Win	11–0	(Mexico) Sergio Cristobal	TKO	4 (6), 2:06	2011-06-03	(United States) Fantasy Springs Resort Casino, Indio, California	
10	Win	10–0	(Dominican Republic) Francis Ruiz	KO	6 (6), 0:38	2011-05-06	(United States) Fantasy Springs Resort Casino, Indio, California	
9	Win	9–0	(Puerto Rico) Felix Perez	TKO	2 (6), 2:42	2011-04-01	(United States) Fantasy Springs Resort Casino, Indio, California	
8	Win	8–0	(United States) Hugo Ramos	UD	6	2011-03-04	(United States) Fantasy Springs Resort Casino, Indio, California	
7	Win	7–0	(United States) Manuel Ortega	UD	4	2011-01-14	(United States) Fantasy Springs Resort Casino, Indio, California	
6	Win	6–0	(United States) Robert Guillen	UD	4	2010-12-11	(United States) Mandalay Bay Events Center, Paradise, Nevada	
5	Win	5–0	(Mexico) Missael Nunez	UD	4	2010-10-15	(United States) Fantasy Springs Resort Casino, Indio, California	
4	Win	4–0	(United States) Jairo Delgado	KO	1 (4), 2:00	2010-07-02	(United States) Citizens Business Bank Arena, Ontario, California	
3	Win	3–0	(United States) Travis Bedwell	TKO	1 (4), 0:56	2010-06-03	(United States) Commerce Casino, Commerce, California	
2	Win	2–0	(United States) Edwin Rosado	KO	1 (4), 0:43	2010-05-08	(United States) Palm Springs Stadium, Palm Springs, California	
1	Win	1–0	(United States) Gonzalo Nicolas	KO	1 (4), 0:49	2010-03-25	(United States) Commerce Casino, Commerce, California	

== See also ==
- List of world bantamweight boxing champions

Sporting positions
Amateur boxing titles
Previous: Rau'shee Warren	U.S. Flyweight champion 2008	Next: Louie Byrd
Regional boxing titles
Vacant Title last held by Jose Cayetano	NABF super bantamweight champion March 23, 2017 – September 16, 2017	Succeeded by Diego De La Hoya
World boxing titles
Vacant Title last held by Paul Butler	IBF bantamweight champion October 25, 2014 – November 20, 2015; Stripped	Succeeded by Lee Haskins; Promoted from interim champion
