= Miguel Flores (boxer) =

Mexican-American boxer (born 1992)

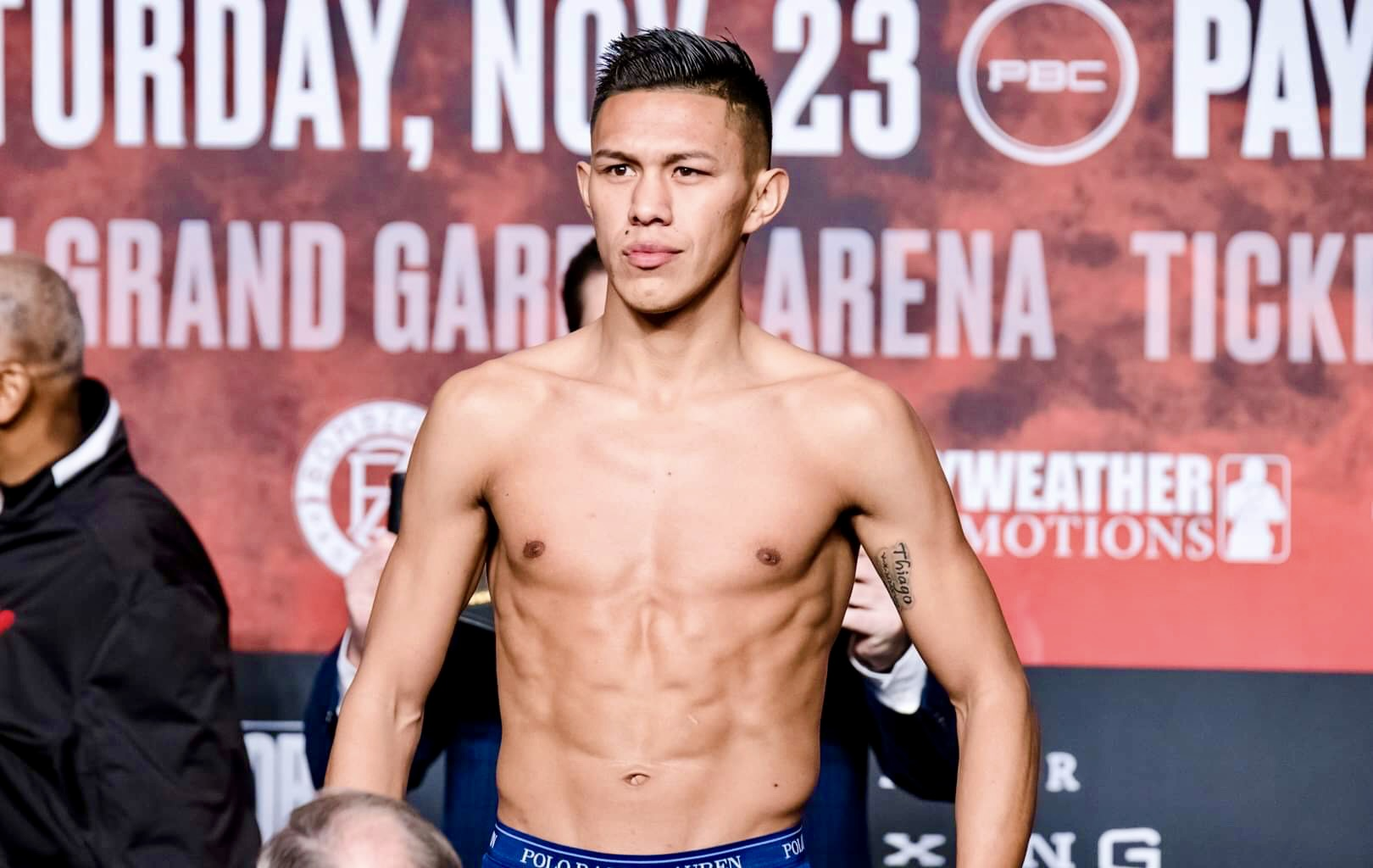
- Flores at weigh-in ahead of fight against Leo Santacruz on November 23, 2019 in Las Vegas

Personal information
- Nickname: El Michoacano
- Nationality: American; Mexican
- Born: Miguel Flores; July 17, 1992 (age 34) Morelia, Michoacán, Mexico
- Height: 5 ft 8 in (173 cm)
- Weight: Featherweight; Super featherweight

Boxing career
- Reach: 69 in (175 cm)

Boxing record
- Total fights: 31
- Wins: 25
- Win by KO: 12
- Losses: 5
- Draws: 1

Miguel Flores (born July 17, 1992) is a Mexican-American professional boxer. He challenged once for the WBA (Super) super featherweight title in November 2019.

== Early life ==
Miguel, a former senior at Sam Houston (Houston, Texas), grew up in the gym watching his brother train. He could sense the respect others had for Ben's dedication to boxing, and Miguel soon craved exactly the same thing. His older brother, Benjamin Flores, was a former Super Bantamweight boxer. During a bout, Benjamin was critically hurt and required paramedic attention and was rushed to nearby Parkland Hospital to undergo emergency surgery to relieve swelling on his brain. He died five days later, on May 5, 2009, from brain injuries suffered in the ring.

== Amateur career ==
Flores traveled the country for tournaments and he won Ringside World Championships in 2006 and 2008. He reportedly had about 100 amateur bouts.

== Professional career ==
=== Featherweight ===
Miguel's first professional fight came 101 days after his brother died. It lasted 31 seconds. He knocked out his next two opponents in similar fashion.

== Professional boxing record ==
31 fights	25 wins	5 losses
By knockout	12	3
By decision	13	2
Draws	1	

No.	Result	Record	Opponent	Type	Round, time	Date	Location	Notes
31	Loss	25–5–1	Sam Goodman	UD	12	Oct 15, 2023	Gold Coast Convention and Exhibition Centre, Broadbeach, Australia	
30	Draw	25–4–1	Abner Mares	MD	10	Sep 4, 2022	Crypto.com Arena, Los Angeles, California, U.S.	
29	Win	25–4	Diuhi Olguin	SD	8	Jun 19, 2021	Toyota Center, Houston, Texas, U.S.	
28	Loss	24–4	Eduardo Ramirez	KO	5 (12), 0:20	Dec 5, 2020	AT&T Stadium, Arlington, Texas, U.S.	For vacant WBC Continental Americas featherweight title
27	Loss	24–3	Léo Santa Cruz	UD	12	Nov 23, 2019	MGM Grand Garden Arena, Paradise, Nevada, U.S.	For vacant WBA (Super) super featherweight title
26	Win	24–2	Luis May	TKO	6 (10), 2:09	Jun 29, 2019	NRG Arena, Houston, Texas, U.S.	
25	Win	23–2	Raul Chirino	TKO	2 (6), 2:20	Apr 28, 2018	Don Haskins Center, El Paso, Texas, U.S.	
24	Loss	22–2	Chris Avalos	RTD	5 (10), 3:00	Jul 18, 2017	Rapides Parish Coliseum, Alexandria, Louisiana, U.S.	
23	Loss	22–1	Dat Nguyen	TKO	6 (10), 0:55	Feb 21, 2017	Silver Street Studios, Houston, Texas, U.S.	
22	Win	22–0	Ryan Kielczweski	UD	10	Aug 12, 2016	Turning Stone Resort Casino, Verona, New York, U.S.	
21	Win	21–0	Ruben Tamayo	UD	10	May 28, 2016	Cowboy's Dance Hall, San Antonio, Texas, U.S.	
20	Win	20–0	Mario Briones	UD	10	Jan 12, 2016	Cowboy's Dance Hall, San Antonio, Texas, U.S.	
19	Win	19–0	Alfred Tetteh	KO	2 (10), 2:44	Nov 10, 2015	Music Hall, Austin, Texas, U.S.	
18	Win	18–0	Carlos Padilla	TKO	4 (8), 1:47	Sep 6, 2015	American Bank Center, Corpus Christi, Texas, U.S.	
17	Win	17–0	Juan Ruiz	UD	8	Jul 19, 2015	Don Haskins Center, El Paso, Texas, U.S.	
16	Win	16–0	Germán Meraz	UD	8	May 9, 2015	State Farm Arena, Hidalgo, Texas, U.S.	
15	Win	15–0	Jose Luis Araiza	MD	6	Dec 20, 2014	Little Creek Casino Resort, Shelton, Washington, U.S.	
14	Win	14–0	Jose Del Valle	UD	6	Apr 18, 2014	Illusions Theater, San Antonio, Texas, U.S.	
13	Win	13–0	Jorge Luis Rodriguez	TKO	3 (8), 1:09	Dec 14, 2013	Arena Quequi, Playa del Carmen, Mexico	
12	Win	12–0	Arturo Herrera	TKO	3 (4), 2:55	Aug 16, 2013	Casa de Amistad, Harlingen, Texas, U.S.	
11	Win	11–0	Guadalupe De Leon	UD	4	Apr 20, 2013	Alamodome, San Antonio, Texas, U.S.	
10	Win	10–0	Gerardo Dominguez	UD	4	Jul 28, 2011	The Houston Club, Houston, Texas, U.S.	
9	Win	9–0	Rolando Campos	TKO	5 (6), 2:35	May 19, 2011	The Houston Club, Houston, Texas, U.S.	
8	Win	8–0	Rheno Nieto	TKO	4 (6), 0:39	Jan 27, 2011	The Houston Club, Houston, Texas, U.S.	
7	Win	7–0	David Green	UD	4	Aug 19, 2010	Charles T. Doyle Convention Center, Texas City, Texas, U.S.	
6	Win	6–0	Julio Valadez	UD	4	Jun 4, 2010	Charles T. Doyle Convention Center, Texas City, Texas, U.S.	
5	Win	5–0	David Green	TKO	2 (4), 0:10	Mar 18, 2010	Charles T. Doyle Convention Center, Texas City, Texas, U.S.	
4	Win	4–0	Julio Valadez	UD	4	Feb 11, 2010	The Houston Club, Houston, Texas, U.S.	
3	Win	3–0	Edson Renteria	TKO	1 (4), 1:35	Oct 23, 2009	Houston Hobby Marriot, Houston, Texas, U.S.	
2	Win	2–0	Breuntre Miller	TKO	2 (4), 1:13	Sep 30, 2009	Shooters, Texarkana, Arkansas, U.S.	
1	Win	1–0	Cody Gardner	TKO	1 (4), 0:31	Aug 14, 2009	Houston Hobby Marriot, Houston, Texas, U.S.	
