= Jhack Tepora =

Filipino boxer

Personal information
- Nickname: El Kapitan
- Born: April 8, 1995 (age 31) Cebu City, Cebu, Philippines
- Height: 5 ft 6 in (168 cm)
- Weight: Super bantamweight; Featherweight

Boxing career
- Reach: 67 in (170 cm)
- Stance: Southpaw

Boxing record
- Total fights: 26
- Wins: 25
- Win by KO: 19
- Losses: 1

Jhack Tepora (born April 8, 1995) is a Filipino professional boxer who is the former interim World Boxing Association Featherweight champion.

== Professional career ==
Tepora turned professional in 2012 and won 21 consecutive fights before challenging and beating Mexican boxer Edivaldo Ortega for the vacant WBA interim featherweight title. He was scheduled to defend the title against Mexican challenger Hugo Ruiz on the undercard of the Manny Pacquiao vs. Adrien Broner fight, however he would fail to make weight which resulted in the WBA stripping him of the title. He would also be replaced by Alberto Guevara in the fight against Ruiz.

== Professional boxing record ==
26 fights	25 wins	1 loss
By knockout	19	1
By decision	6	0

No.	Result	Record	Opponent	Type	Round, time	Date	Location	Notes
26	Win	25–1	David Banda Leal	TKO	1 (8), 0:25	2024-04-19	Auditorio Municipal de Tijuana, Tijuana, Mexico	
25	Win	24–1	Richard Betos	KO	2 (6), 2:07	2022-04-26	Sanman Gym, General Santos City, Philippines	
24	Loss	23–1	Óscar Escandón	KO	1 (10), 1:30	2019-12-21	Toyota Arena, Ontario, California, U.S.	
23	Win	23–0	Jose Gallegos	UD	10 (10)	2019-06-01	Soboba Casino, San Jacinto, California, U.S.	
22	Win	22–0	Edivaldo Ortega	TKO	9 (12), 2:38	2018-07-15	Axiata Arena, Kuala Lumpur, Malaysia	Won vacant interim WBA featherweight title
21	Win	21–0	Lusanda Komanisi	KO	2 (12), 1:59	2017-09-22	Orient Theatre, East London, South Africa	Won vacant WBO Inter-Continental featherweight title
20	Win	20–0	Yon Armed	KO	1 (12), 1:16	2017-03-18	Waterfront Hotel & Casino, Cebu City, Philippines	Retained WBO Oriental super-bantamweight title
19	Win	19–0	Galih Susanto	TKO	5 (12), 2:30	2016-12-02	Sports and Cultural Complex, Mandaue City, Philippines	Won vacant WBO Oriental super-bantamweight title
18	Win	18–0	Bryan Capangpangan	TKO	1 (10), 2:34	2016-07-30	Robinson's Galleria, Cebu City, Philippines	Retained WBO Asia Pacific Youth super-bantamweight title
17	Win	17–0	Jason Tinampay	KO	5 (10), 2:05	2016-03-06	Robinson's Galleria, Cebu City, Philippines	Won vacant WBO Asia Pacific Youth super-bantamweight title
16	Win	16–0	Andrew Palas	UD	10	2016-01-09	Borbon Sports Complex, Borbon, Philippines	Won vacant Philippines Super Bantamweight title
15	Win	15–0	Jason Egera	KO	1 (10), 1:36	2015-09-12	Sabang Gym, Danao City, Philippines	
14	Win	14–0	Jilo Merlin	RTD	5 (6), 3:00	2015-06-12	La Proa Ballroom, Bacolod City, Philippines	
13	Win	13–0	Marvin Tampus	TKO	1 (10), 2:33	2015-02-02	Dalaguete Sports Center, Dalaguete, Philippines	
12	Win	12–0	Jonrae Verano	RTD	5 (8), 3:00	2014-12-07	Guadalupe Sports Center, Cebu City, Philippines	
11	Win	11–0	Michael Escobia	TKO	2 (10), 2:07	2014-08-23	Almendras Gym, Davao City, Philippines	
10	Win	10–0	Joas Apericio	TKO	10 (12), 1:37	2014-05-03	Waterfront Hotel & Casino, Cebu City, Philippines	
9	Win	9–0	Alvin Makiling	UD	10	2013-12-14	Lagao Gym, General Santos City, Philippines	
8	Win	8–0	Danilo Gabisay	UD	8	2013-10-26	Makati Coliseum, Makati City, Philippines	
7	Win	7–0	Randy Gomez	KO	1 (8), 1:27	2013-08-01	Waterfront Hotel & Casino, Cebu City, Philippines	
6	Win	6–0	Mark Jun Tubo	TKO	1 (4), 1:14	2013-02-08	Dalaguete Sports Complex, Dalaguete, Philippines	
5	Win	5–0	Rommel Banquirego	UD	6	2012-10-06	Dalaguete Sports Complex, Dalaguete, Philippines	
4	Win	4–0	J.R. Salvador	UD	6	2012-07-29	J Center Mall convention hall, Mandaue City, Philippines	
3	Win	3–0	Reymund Fermin	KO	4 (4)	2012-04-21	Sports and Cultural Complex, Mandaue City, Philippines	
2	Win	2–0	Michael Dopol	TKO	1 (4), 1:27	2012-03-17	Hoops Dome, Lapu-Lapu City, Philippines	
1	Win	1–0	John Edu Torbiso	RTD	1 (4), 3:00	2012-03-04	New Cebu Coliseum, Cebu City, Philippines	

== Personal life ==
Tepora has a wife named Dinah Comision Tepora.

== See also ==
- List of southpaw stance boxers
- History of boxing in the Philippines

Sporting positions
Regional boxing titles
Vacant Title last held by Jelbirt Gomera	Philippines super-bantamweight champion January 9, 2016 – 2016; Vacated	Vacant Title next held by Ryan Lumacad
Vacant Title last held by Daniel Iannazzo	WBO Asia Pacific Youth super-bantamweight champion March 6, 2016 – 2016; Vacated	Vacant Title next held by Jiyang Gao
Vacant Title last held by Jimmy Paypa	WBO Oriental super-bantamweight champion December 2, 2016 – 2017; Vacated	Vacant Title next held by Jeo Santisima
Vacant Title last held by Marco McCullough	WBO Inter-Continental featherweight champion September 22, 2017 – July 15, 2018; Won interim title	Vacant Title next held by Michael Conlan
World boxing titles
Vacant Title last held by Jesús Rojas	WBA featherweight champion Interim title July 15, 2018 – January 18, 2019; Stripped, did not make weight	Vacant Title next held by Eduardo Ramirez
