= Eduardo Ramírez =

Eduardo Ramírez may refer to:

- Eduardo Ramírez Aguilar (born 1973), Mexican politician, governor of Chiapas
- Eduardo Ramírez Velázquez ("Eduardo España"; born 1971), Mexican actor
- Eduardo Ramírez Villamizar (1922–2004), Colombian painter and sculptor
- Eduardo Ramírez (boxer) (born 1993), Mexican professional boxer
