= Floyd Mayweather Jr. vs. Robert Guerrero =

Boxing competition

May Day
- Date: May 4, 2013
- Venue: MGM Grand Garden Arena, Paradise, Nevada, U.S.
- Title(s) on the line: WBC and vacant The Ring welterweight titles

Tale of the tape
Boxer	Floyd Mayweather Jr.	Robert Guerrero
Nickname	Money	The Ghost
Hometown	Grand Rapids, Michigan, U.S.	Gilroy, California, U.S.
Purse	$32,000,000	$3,000,000
Pre-fight record	43–0 (26 KO)	31–1–1 (2) (18 KO)
Age	36 years, 2 months	30 years, 1 month
Height	5 ft 8 in (173 cm)	5 ft 8 in (173 cm)
Weight	146 lb (66 kg)	147 lb (67 kg)
Style	Orthodox	Southpaw
Recognition	WBC; Welterweight Champion; WBA (Super); Super Welterweight champion The Ring/TBRB; No. 1 Ranked Welterweight; The Ring No. 1 ranked pound-for-pound fighter 5-division world champion	WBC; Interim Welterweight Champion; The Ring; No. 3 Ranked Welterweight; TBRB; No. 5 Ranked Welterweight; The Ring No. 8 ranked pound-for-pound fighter 2-division world champion

Result
- Mayweather Jr. wins via 12-round unanimous decision (117-111, 117-111, 117-111)

Floyd Mayweather Jr. vs. Robert Guerrero, billed as May Day, was a professional boxing match contested on May 4, 2013, for the WBC and vacant The Ring welterweight championship.

== Background ==
Since moving up to Light middleweight to successfully challenge Miguel Cotto in May 2012, Floyd Mayweather Jr. had spent two months in jail for domestic abuse. Since his release in August, he spend the rest of the year inactive.

In the meantime Robert Guerrero had defeated Selçuk Aydın to become the WBC's "interim" welterweight champion in July 2012, and in November he defended it by winning a unanimous decision over Andre Berto. In the aftermath he called out Mayweather saying, "Pretty Boy, let's do it."

In February it was announced that Mayweather would make the first defence of his welterweight title against Guerrero in May, 19 months after he won the title from Victor Ortiz.

The bout was held on May 4, at the MGM Grand Garden Arena at the MGM Grand Hotel & Casino in Las Vegas, Nevada, United States on Showtime PPV. The bout was the first major televised fight of Mayweather's career to not be aired on HBO PPV. The card featured some of the rising stars of Mayweather Promotions: J'Leon Love, Badou Jack, Luis Arias, Ronald Gavril and Lanell Bellows.

At Mayweather's insistent a rematch clause was included in the contract.

== The fight ==
The first couple rounds were fairly even, with Mayweather attempting to counter and time Guerrero, while Guerrero was attempting to drive Mayweather to the ropes and make it a rough fight. After the first couple rounds, Mayweather was in complete control, almost hitting Guerrero at will with right hand leads, counters, hooks, and effectively timing Guerrero the rest of the fight.

At the end of 12 rounds, Mayweather won the fight on all three scorecards 117–111.

Mayweather's assistant trainer (his father) advised him onto a very defensive strategy, saying that "the less you get hit, the longer you last". This style of fighting elicited boos from the crowd especially during the 11th and 12th round when Floyd may have believed he had the score "locked up" already and didn't need to win any more rounds, saying that "When you're up on the cards, box smart."

Throughout the fight, Mayweather landed 195 punches to 113 for Guerrero.

== Fight earnings ==
Floyd Mayweather equalled his own all time base purse record with a guaranteed $32 million. Robert Guerrero was guaranteed $3 million.

== Fight Card ==
Confirmed bouts:

Weight Class				Result	Round	Time	Notes
Welterweight	(United States) Floyd Mayweather Jr.	def.	(United States) Robert Guerrero	Unanimous Decision	12	3:00	Championship bout.
Featherweight	(Mexico) Abner Mares	def.	(Mexico) Daniel Ponce de León	TKO	9	2:20	Championship bout.
Super Bantamweight	(Mexico) Léo Santa Cruz	def.	(Venezuela) Alexander Muñoz	TKO	5	1:05
Middleweight	(United States) J'Leon Love	vs.	(United States) Gabriel Rosado	No Contest	10	3:00
Super Middleweight	(Romania) Ronald Gavril	def.	(United States) Roberto Yong	TKO	3	2:12
Super Middleweight	(United States) Lanell Bellows	def.	(United States) Matt Garretson	TKO	4	0:32
Super Middleweight	(United States) Luis Arias	def.	(United States) DonYil Livingston	Majority Decision	6	3:00
Light Heavyweight	(Sweden) Badou Jack	def.	(Ghana) Michael Gbenga	TKO	3	2:26

== International broadcasting ==
Country	Broadcaster
Australia	Main Event
Brazil	SporTV
Canada	Bell TV PPV
China	CCTV-5
Denmark	TV3 Sport
Estonia	Viasat Sport Baltic
France	beIN Sport
Japan	WOWOW
Latvia	Viasat Sport Baltic
Lithuania	Viasat Sport Baltic
Malaysia	Astro
Mexico	Televisa Deportes
New Zealand	Sky Arena
Norway	Viasat Sport
Panama	RPC-TV
Philippines	Solar Sports, GMA Network, GMA News TV† and AKTV on IBC††
Poland	Orange Sport
Portugal	Sport TV
Qatar	Al Jazeera Sports
Romania	GSP TV
Russia	NTV Plus
Spain	Canal+
South Africa	SuperSport
Thailand	TrueVisions
United Kingdom	BoxNation
United States	Showtime PPV
Venezuela	Meridiano

† The GMA News TV version cancelled due to low ratings of Floyd Mayweather Jr. vs. Robert Guerrero, billed as May Day
†† AKTV on IBC coverage have stopped airing due to high blocktime costs of Mayweather-Guerrero fight during primetime telecast. The last AKTV sports block before its shut down on May 31, 2013.

Preceded by vs. Miguel Cotto	Floyd Mayweather Jr.'s bouts 5 May 2013	Succeeded by vs. Canelo Álvarez
Preceded by vs. Andre Berto	Robert Guerrero's bouts 5 May 2013	Succeeded by vs. Yoshihiro Kamegai
