= Eduardo Ramírez (boxer) =

Mexican boxer

Eduardo Ramirez
Personal information
- Nickname: Zurdito
- Born: Eduardo Antonio Solorza Ramirez; January 17, 1993 (age 33) Los Mochis, Mexico
- Height: 5 ft 6 in (168 cm)
- Weight: Super bantamweight; Featherweight; Lightweight

Boxing career
- Reach: 70 in (178 cm)
- Stance: Southpaw

Boxing record
- Total fights: 37
- Wins: 28
- Win by KO: 13
- Losses: 5
- Draws: 3
- No contests: 1

Eduardo Antonio Solorza Ramirez (born January 17, 1993) is a Mexican professional boxer.

== Professional career ==
Ramirez turned professional in 2010 and compiled a record of 25-2-3 before facing and defeating Isaac Avelar to win the interim featherweight title.

=== 2024 ===
Late May 2024 it was announced that Ramirez would face Mark Magsayo in a WBC super featherweight title eliminator at MGM Grand Garden Arena in Las Vegas on June 15, 2024. Ramirez lost the fight by unanimous decision.

== Professional boxing record ==
36 fights	28 wins	4 losses
By knockout	13	1
By decision	15	3
Draws	3	
No contests	1	

No.	Result	Record	Opponent	Type	Round, time	Date	Location	Notes
36	Loss	28–4–3 (1)	Mark Magsayo	UD	10	15 Jun 2024	MGM Grand Garden Arena, Paradise, Nevada, U.S.	For vacant WBA Inter-Continental super featherweight title
35	Win	28–3–3 (1)	Sebastian Maldonado	TKO	6 (10), 0:01	19 Aug 2023	Los Mochis, Sinaloa, Mexico	
34	Loss	27–3–3 (1)	Isaac Cruz	KO	2 (12), 2:27	4 Sep 2022	Crypto.com Arena, Los Angeles, California, U.S.	For vacant WBC Silver lightweight title
33	Win	27–2–3 (1)	Luis Melendez	MD	10	May 28, 2022	Barclays Center, New York City, New York, U.S.	
32	Win	26–2–3 (1)	Miguel Marriaga	UD	10	5 Dec 2021	Staples Center, Los Angeles, California, U.S.	
31	Win	25–2–3 (1)	Isaac Avelar	TKO	3 (12), 1:16	May 1, 2021	Dignity Health Sports Park, Carson, California, U.S.	Won vacant WBA interim featherweight title
30	Win	24–2–3 (1)	Miguel Flores	TKO	5 (12), 0:20	Dec 5, 2020	AT&T Stadium, Arlington, Texas, U.S.	Won vacant WBC Americas featherweight title
29	Win	23–2–3 (1)	Leduan Barthelemy	TKO	4 (10), 2:59	Nov 23, 2019	MGM Grand Garden Arena, Paradise, Nevada, U.S.	
28	Loss	22–2–3 (1)	Claudio Marrero	UD	12	Jun 29, 2019	NRG Arena, Houston, Texas, U.S.	
27	Win	22–1–3 (1)	Bryan De Gracia	TKO	9 (12), 2:10	Mar 2, 2019	Barclays Center, New York City, New York, U.S.	
26	Win	21–1–3 (1)	Carlos Jacobo	TKO	1 (8), 2:43	Nov 30, 2018	Los Mochis, Mexico	
25	Loss	20–1–3 (1)	Lee Selby	UD	12	Dec 9, 2017	Copper Box Arena, London, England	IBF featherweight title at stake for Selby only after Ramirez missed weight
24	Draw	20–0–3 (1)	Leduan Barthelemy	SD	10	Sep 26, 2017	Cannery Casino and Hotel, North Las Vegas, Nevada, U.S.	
23	Win	20–0–2 (1)	Guillermo Osvaldo Soloppi	UD	8	May 13, 2017	Centro de Convenciones, Punta del Este, Uruguay	
22	Win	19–0–2 (1)	Edivaldo Ortega	UD	10	Dec 3, 2016	Polideportivo Centenario, Los Mochis, Mexico	
21	Win	18–0–2 (1)	Alan Salazar	UD	6	Jul 2, 2016	Gimnasio Municipal, Ciudad Juárez, Mexico	
20	Win	17–0–2 (1)	Misael Buitimea	TKO	3 (6), 1:55	Feb 13, 2016	Centro de Usos Multiples, Ciudad Obregón, Mexico	
19	Win	16–0–2 (1)	Eleazar Valenzuela	UD	6	Sep 19, 2015	Centro de Usos Multiples, Hermosillo, Mexico	
18	Win	15–0–2 (1)	Jose Quintero Velarde	UD	8	Jul 25, 2015	Polideportivo Centenario, Los Mochis, Mexico	
17	Win	14–0–2 (1)	Alem Robles	UD	8	May 23, 2015	Polideportivo Centenario, Los Mochis, Mexico	
16	Win	13–0–2 (1)	Roman Morales	UD	9	Mar 21, 2015	Palenque Feria Mesoamericana, Tapachula, Mexico	Won vacant WBA Fedecentro super bantamweight title
15	Win	12–0–2 (1)	Jose Eduardo Poom	RTD	2 (6), 3:00	Feb 14, 2015	Palenque de la Expo Gan, Hermosillo, Mexico	
14	Win	11–0–2 (1)	Rafael Reyes	TKO	6 (8)	Sep 20, 2014	Estadio de Beisbol, Guamúchil, Mexico	
13	Win	10–0–2 (1)	Miguel Armando Martinez	TKO	6 (6), 1:19	Apr 11, 2014	Ingenio Azucarero, Los Mochis, Mexico	
12	NC	9–0–2 (1)	Saul Hermosillo	NC	7 (8)	Mar 14, 2014	Gimnasio Manuel Lira, Ciudad Obregón, Mexico	
11	Draw	9–0–2	Jose Quintero Velarde	PTS	8	Nov 29, 2013	Ingenio Azucarero, Los Mochis, Mexico	
10	Win	9–0–1	Miguel Angel Rodriguez	UD	8	Aug 30, 2013	Solidaid, Monterrey, Mexico	
9	Win	8–0–1	Edgar Bustillos	UD	4	Jun 15, 2012	Salon Forum, Los Mochis, Mexico	
8	Win	7–0–1	Wilbert Ortiz	TKO	2 (4), 2:54	Mar 3, 2012	Gimnasio German Evers, Mazatlán, Mexico	
7	Win	6–0–1	Gregorio Cortez	UD	4	Feb 3, 2012	Arena Union, Los Mochis, Mexico	
6	Win	5–0–1	Edgar Bustillos	UD	4	Nov 19, 2011	Estadio Centenario, Los Mochis, Mexico	
5	Draw	4–0–1	Mario Munoz	PTS	4	Oct 15, 2011	Estadio Centenario, Los Mochis, Mexico	
4	Win	4–0	Alex Robles	UD	4	Jun 25, 2011	Estadio Banorte, Culiacán, Mexico	
3	Win	3–0	Cristian Osorio	TKO	2 (4), 0:23	Apr 29, 2011	Polideportivo Centenario, Los Mochis, Mexico	
2	Win	2–0	Juan Pedro Rodriguez	TKO	1 (4), 2:08	Mar 5, 2011	Palenque de la Feria, Tepic, Mexico	
1	Win	1–0	Francisco Amaral	UD	4	Sep 24, 2010	Polideportivo Centenario, Los Mochis, Mexico	

== See also ==
- List of world featherweight boxing champions

Achievements
Regional boxing titles
Vacant Title last held by Shakur Stevenson	WBC featherweight champion Continental Americas title December 5, 2020 – May 1, 2021; Won interim WBA title	Vacant
World boxing titles
Vacant Title last held by Jhack Tepora	WBA featherweight interim champion May 1 – August 2, 2021; Vacated	Vacant Title next held by Michael Conlan
