= Julio Ceja (boxer) =

Mexican boxer (born 1992)

Personal information
- Nickname: Pollito
- Born: Julio César Ceja Pedraza; November 18, 1992 (age 33) Tlalnepantla de Baz State of Mexico, Mexico
- Height: 5 ft 7 in (170 cm)
- Weight: Super flyweight; Bantamweight; Super bantamweight

Boxing career
- Reach: 63 1/2 in (161 cm)
- Stance: Orthodox

Boxing record
- Total fights: 38
- Wins: 32
- Win by KO: 28
- Losses: 5
- Draws: 1

Julio César Ceja Pedraza (born November 18, 1992) is a Mexican professional boxer. He held the WBC super bantamweight title from 2015 to 2016.

== Professional career ==
=== IBF title fight ===
On May 11, 2013, Ceja lost to Jamie McDonnell for the IBF bantamweight world title by majority decision after Léo Santa Cruz vacated the title to move up in weight.

=== WBC Silver title fight ===
On October 12, 2013, Ceja defeated Juan José Montes by 10th-round technical knockout to win the WBC Silver bantamweight title.

=== WBC interim title fight ===
Ceja defeated Hugo Ruiz for the interim WBC World super bantamweight title. The interim title was made available due to Léo Santa Cruz moving to featherweight. Ceja was later elevated to full title holder after Santa Cruz vacated.

== Professional boxing record ==
38 fights	32 wins	5 losses
By knockout	28	4
By decision	4	1
Draws	1	

No.	Result	Record	Opponent	Type	Round, time	Date	Location	Notes
38	Loss	32–5–1	Mark Magsayo	KO	10 (12), 2:33	21 Aug 2021	T-Mobile Arena, Paradise, Nevada, U.S.	For WBO International featherweight title
37	Draw	32–4–1	Brandon Figueroa	SD	12	23 Nov 2019	MGM Grand Garden Arena, Las Vegas, Nevada, U.S.	For WBA (Regular) super bantamweight title
36	Loss	32–4	Guillermo Rigondeaux	TKO	8 (12), 2:59	23 Jun 2019	Mandalay Bay Events Center, Las Vegas, U.S.	
35	Loss	32–3	Franklin Manzanilla	RTD	4 (12), 3:00	26 May 2018	Teatro Moliere, Mexico City, Mexico	Lost WBC Silver super bantamweight title
34	Win	32–2	Breilor Teran	UD	12	25 Nov 2017	Palenque de Deportes, Chetumal, Mexico	Retained WBC Silver super bantamweight title
33	Win	31–2	Anselmo Moreno	KO	3 (12), 2:32	27 May 2017	Centro de Convenciones Amador, Panama City, Panama	Won vacant WBC Silver super bantamweight title
32	Loss	30–2	Hugo Ruiz	TKO	1 (12), 0:51	27 Feb 2016	Honda Center, Anaheim, U.S.	Lost WBC super bantamweight title
31	Win	30–1	Hugo Ruiz	TKO	5 (12), 2:34	29 Aug 2015	Staples Center, Los Angeles, U.S.	Won WBC interim super bantamweight title
30	Win	29–1	Oscar Blanquet	UD	10	14 Mar 2015	Auditorio Municipal, Naucalpan, Mexico	
29	Win	28–1	Lionel Mark Duran	KO	5 (12)	22 Nov 2014	Plaza de los Martíres, Toluca, Mexico	Retained WBC Silver bantamweight title
28	Win	27–1	Ranel Suco	TKO	10 (12)	26 Apr 2014	Foro Polanco, Mexico City, Mexico	Retained WBC Silver bantamweight title
27	Win	26–1	Jesus Acosta	TKO	4 (10)	8 Feb 2014	Caballerizas de Huixquilucan, Huixquilucan, Mexico	
26	Win	25–1	Juan José Montes	TKO	10 (12)	12 Oct 2013	Hard Rock Hotel, Puerto Vallarta, Mexico	Won vacant WBC Silver bantamweight title
25	Loss	24–1	Jamie McDonnell	MD	12	11 May 2013	Keepmoat Stadium, Doncaster, England	For vacant IBF bantamweight title
24	Win	24–0	Henry Maldonado	KO	5 (10)	9 Feb 2013	Arena ITSON, Ciudad Obregon, Mexico	Retained WBC FECARBOX bantamweight title
23	Win	23–0	Eden Marquez	KO	2 (10)	21 Dec 2012	Auditorio Ernesto Rufo, Rosarito, Mexico	
22	Win	22–0	Luis Melendez	TKO	6 (10)	24 Nov 2012	Foro Polanco, Mexico City, Mexico	Retained WBC FECARBOX bantamweight title
21	Win	21–0	Genaro García	UD	10	22 Sep 2012	Unidad Deportiva Norte, Cortázar, Mexico	Retained IBF Latino bantamweight title
20	Win	20–0	Genaro Camargo	TKO	3 (12)	28 Jul 2012	Domo de la Feria, Leon, Mexico	Won vacant IBF Latino bantamweight title
19	Win	19–0	Cruz Carbajal	KO	3 (10)	28 Apr 2012	Grand Oasis Resort, Cancun, Mexico	
18	Win	18–0	Ronald Barrera	KO	4 (12)	21 Jan 2012	Centro de Convenciones, Jilotepec, Mexico	Won vacant WBC FECARBOX bantamweight title
17	Win	17–0	Elvis Guillen	TKO	2 (4)	26 Nov 2011	Campo Futbol Colosio, Playa del Carmen, Mexico	
16	Win	16–0	Alejandro Morales	TKO	1 (12)	3 Sep 2011	Estadio Centenario, Los Mochis, Mexico	Retained WBC FECARBOX super flyweight title
15	Win	15–0	Cesar Javier Gandara	KO	3 (12)	25 Jun 2011	Parque Andrés Quintana Roo, Cozumel, Mexico	Won vacant WBC FECARBOX super flyweight title
14	Win	14–0	Victor Martinez	KO	4 (10)	27 May 2011	Music Hall, Ciudad Victoria, Mexico	
13	Win	13–0	Rodolfo Hernandez	KO	3 (10)	4 Mar 2011	Music Hall, Ciudad Victoria, Mexico	
12	Win	12–0	Luis Angel Rosales	TKO	7 (8)	19 Nov 2010	Deportivo Tlalli, Tlalnepantla, Mexico	
11	Win	11–0	Pedro Melo	TKO	4 (6)	23 Oct 2010	World Trade Center, Mexico City, Mexico	
10	Win	10–0	Ricardo Mercado	TKO	3 (4)	22 Jul 2010	Jose Cuervo Salon, Polanco, Mexico	
9	Win	9–0	Cesar Reyes	TKO	1 (4)	3 Jun 2010	Jose Cuervo Salon, Polanco, Mexico	
8	Win	8–0	Gustavo Molina	KO	1 (4)	22 Apr 2010	Jose Cuervo Salon, Polanco, Mexico	
7	Win	7–0	Randy Castro	KO	4 (4)	11 Mar 2010	Jose Cuervo Salon, Polanco, Mexico	
6	Win	6–0	Eugenio Espiritu	TKO	3 (4)	12 Feb 2010	Deportivo Tlalli, Tlalnepantla, Mexico	
5	Win	5–0	Eduardo Vargas	TKO	2 (4)	4 Dec 2009	Arena Champotón, Ciudad Del Carmen, Mexico	
4	Win	4–0	Javier Vilchis	TKO	1	9 Nov 2009	Restaurante Arroyo, Mexico City, Mexico	
3	Win	3–0	Cristian Estrada	TKO	1 (4)	6 Oct 2009	Restaurante Arroyo, Mexico City, Mexico	
2	Win	2–0	Fernando Curiel	UD	4	8 Sep 2009	Restaurante Arroyo, Mexico City, Mexico	
1	Win	1–0	Floro Carranza	TKO	1 (4)	17 Jul 2009	Arena Adolfo López Mateos, Tlalnepantla, Mexico	

== See also ==
- List of super-bantamweight boxing champions
- List of Mexican boxing world champions

Achievements
Vacant Title last held by Toshiaki Nishioka	WBC super bantamweight champion Interim Title; August 29, 2015 – November 1, 2015; Promoted	Vacant Title next held by Tomoki Kameda
Preceded by Léo Santa Cruz; Vacated	WBC super bantamweight champion November 1, 2015 – February 27, 2016	Succeeded by Hugo Ruiz
