= Canelo Álvarez vs. Gennady Golovkin =

2017 professional boxing match

Supremacy
- Date: September 16, 2017
- Venue: T-Mobile Arena; Paradise, Nevada, United States
- Title(s) on the line: WBA (Super), WBC, IBF, IBO, and The Ring middleweight titles

Tale of the tape
Boxer	Saúl Álvarez	Gennady Golovkin
Nickname	Canelo ("Cinnamon")	GGG
Hometown	Guadalajara, Jalisco, Mexico	Karagandy, Karaganda Region, Kazakhstan
Purse	$5,000,000	$3,000,000
Pre-fight record	49–1–1 (34 KO)	37–0 (33 KO)
Age	27 years, 1 month	35 years, 5 months
Height	5 ft 8 in (173 cm)	5 ft 10 1/2 in (179 cm)
Weight	160 lb (73 kg)	160 lb (73 kg)
Style	Orthodox	Orthodox
Recognition	The Ring middleweight champion The Ring No. 7 ranked pound-for-pound fighter 2-division world champion	WBA (Super), WBC, IBF and IBO middleweight champion The Ring No. 2 ranked pound-for-pound fighter

Result
- 12-round split draw (118–110, 113–115, 114–114)

Canelo Álvarez vs. Gennady Golovkin, billed as Supremacy, was a professional boxing match contested for the unified WBA (Super), WBC, IBF, IBO, Ring magazine, and lineal middleweight championship. The bout was on September 16, 2017, at T-Mobile Arena on the Las Vegas Strip. It was televised on HBO pay-per-view in the United States, on BoxNation Box Office in the United Kingdom, and on Space in Latin America.

Despite Golovkin outlanding Alvarez in 10 of the 12 rounds according to Compubox, the fight ended in a controversial split draw, with Dave Moretti scoring the fight 115–113 for Golovkin, Adalaide Byrd scoring it 118–110 for Álvarez, and Don Trella scoring it 114–114. Byrd's scorecard especially was subject to a very large amount of criticism, with many critics describing the decision as a robbery.

The controversial outcome led to the organization of a rematch, which was tentatively scheduled for May 5, 2018. The fight was canceled after Álvarez tested positive for a banned substance in March 2018, and formally withdrew pending hearings with the Nevada Athletic Commission in April. After facing a suspension until August 17, 2018, Álvarez and Golovkin agreed to reschedule the rematch to September 15, 2018.

== Background and hype ==
Following Canelo Álvarez's victory against Miguel Cotto in 2015, talks began between the Golovkin and Álvarez camps over the future WBC title defense. In the end, an agreement was ultimately reached to allow interim bouts before the fight to, in the words of WBC president Mauricio Sulaiman, "maximize the interest in their highly anticipated showdown. The fight was anticipated to take place well into 2016.

On May 18, 2016, a few weeks after knocking out Amir Khan, Álvarez vacated the WBC middleweight title, which resulted in Golovkin being immediately awarded the title by the WBC who officially recognized him as their middleweight champion.

Immediately after his victory over Julio César Chávez Jr. on May 6, 2017, Canelo Álvarez announced that he would next fight Gennady Golovkin on the weekend of September 16, 2017 at a location to be determined. Golovkin joined him in the ring during the announcement to help promote their upcoming bout, accompanied by his trainer Abel Sanchez and promoter Tom Loeffler. Speaking through a translator, Álvarez said, "Golovkin, you are next, my friend. The fight is done. I've never feared anyone, since I was 15 fighting as a professional. When I was born, fear was gone." When Golovkin arrived in the ring, he said, "I feel very excited. Right now is a different story. In September, it will be a different style -- a big drama show. I'm ready. Tonight, first congrats to Canelo and his team. Right now, I think everyone is excited for September. Canelo looked very good tonight, and 100 percent he is the biggest challenge of my career. Good luck to Canelo in September." In the post-fight press conference, both boxers came face to face and spoke about the upcoming fight.

On May 9, Eric Gomez, president of Golden Boy Promotions told the LA Times that Álvarez had an immediate rematch clause in place on his contract, whereas Golovkin, if he loses, won't be guaranteed a rematch. De La Hoya later also revealed in an interview with ESPN the fight would take place at the full middleweight limit of 160 pounds with no re-hydration clauses, meaning Golovkin and Álvarez would be able to gain an unlimited amount of weight following the weigh in. On June 5, the T-Mobile Arena in Las Vegas was announced as the venue of the fight, and would mark the first time Golovkin would fight in the state of Nevada. The AT&T Stadium, Madison Square Garden and Dodger Stadium missed out on hosting the fight. Eric Gomez of Golden Boy Promotions said in a statement that Álvarez would fight for the IBF meaning he would participate in the second day weight in, which the IBF require that each boxer weighs no more than 10 pounds over the 160-pound limit. Although he said there was no word on whether Álvarez would fight for the WBC title, Álvarez claimed that he would not be. On July 7, 2017, Golden Boy and K2 Promotions individually announced the tickets had sold out.

=== Fight purses ===
Guaranteed Base Purses

- Canelo Álvarez ($5 million) vs. Gennady Golovkin ($3 million)
- Joseph Diaz ($200,000) vs. Rafael Rivera ($15,000)
- Diego De La Hoya ($80,000) vs. Randy Caballero ($50,000)
- Ryan Martin ($50,000) vs. Francisco Rojo ($25,000)

== The fight ==
On fight night, in front of a sold-out crowd of 22,358, Álvarez and Golovkin fought to a split draw (113–115, 114–114, 118–110). ESPN's Dan Rafael and HBO's Harold Lederman scored the fight 116–112 in favor of Golovkin. Judge Adalaide Byrd's scorecard of 118–110 in favor of Álvarez was widely ridiculed. Many observers felt that Golovkin had won a narrow, closely contested fight, and while a draw was justifiable, a card that wide in favor of Álvarez was inexcusable. Nevertheless, Bob Bennett, director of the Nevada Athletic Commission (NAC), said that he had full confidence on Byrd going forward. Despite the controversy, several mainstream media outlets referred to the bout as a "classic". The first round found both boxers finding their rhythm, Canelo using footwork to become a slippery target using hard counter shots to the body and head as Golovkin seemed to try to establish his power jab, being the busier of the two. Round 2 found Canelo starting to pick up his pace, landing hard body shots throughout the round while Golovkin had a hard time finding a hard shot to damage Canelo. So far, each judge had Canelo up on the scored 20–18. Round 3 had Golovkin pick up his pace, starting the round surprising Canelo with left hooks and right hands as Canelo would later land harder shots, mostly uppercuts and hooks. 2 of the 3 judges gave the round to Golovkin while one judge gave the round to Canelo. Soon, however, the pressure from Golovkin came to Canelo as he would wear down the Mexican star. For the next 6 rounds, Golovkin would become the aggressor, backing Canelo up with harder shots. Canelo did have spots of success, landing an eye catching shot every now and then. Still, during the middle rounds, particularly between 4 and 9, Álvarez started each round quick, but seemed to tire out after a minute, with Golovkin taking over and doing enough to win the rounds. The championship rounds were the best for Canelo, according to the judges as he would exchange with Golovkin, both men missing, but the judges had Canelo winning the last 3 rounds. the judges had a draw, with the scores of 114–114, 115–113 for Golovkin, and 118–110 for Canelo. The draw saw Golovkin make his 19th consecutive defense, just one behind middleweight great Bernard Hopkins. CompuBox stats showed that Golovkin was the busier of the two, landing 218 of 703 thrown (31%), while Álvarez was slightly more accurate, landing 169 of his 505 thrown (33%). Golovkin out landed Álvarez in 10 of the 12 rounds.

=== Main event scorecards ===
Nevada Athletic Commission Official score card
Title: Supremacy					Referee: Kenny Bayless					Supervisor: Ed Levine				
Date: September 16, 2017					Venue: T-Mobile Arena					Promoter: Oscar De La Hoya, Tom Loeffler, Art Pelullo				
Gennady Golovkin		vs.	Saul Alvarez		Gennady Golovkin		vs.	Saul Alvarez		Gennady Golovkin		vs.	Saul Alvarez	
RS	TS	Rd	TS	RS	RS	TS	Rd	TS	RS	RS	TS	Rd	TS	RS
9		1		10	9		1		10	9		1		10
9	18	2	20	10	9	18	2	20	10	9	18	2	20	10
10	28	3	29	9	9	27	3	30	10	10	28	3	29	9
10	38	4	38	9	10	37	4	39	9	10	38	4	38	9
10	48	5	48	9	9	46	5	49	10	10	48	5	48	9
10	58	6	56	9	9	55	6	59	10	10	58	6	56	9
10	68	7	65	9	10	65	7	68	9	9	67	7	66	10
10	78	8	74	9	9	74	8	78	10	10	77	8	75	9
10	88	9	83	9	9	83	9	88	10	10	87	9	84	9
9	97	10	93	10	9	92	10	98	10	9	96	10	94	10
9	106	11	103	10	9	101	11	108	10	9	105	11	104	10
9	115	12	113	10	9	110	12	118	10	9	114	12	114	10
FINAL SCORE	115	–	113	FINAL SCORE	FINAL SCORE	110	–	118	FINAL SCORE	FINAL SCORE	114	–	114	FINAL SCORE
Won			Lost		Lost			Won		Draw			Draw	
Judge: Dave Moretti					Judge: Adalaide Byrd					Judge: Don Trella				
Suspensions: None					Point deductions: None					Decision: Split Draw				

== Aftermath ==
Speaking to Max Kellerman after the fight, Golovkin said, "It was a big drama show. The scoring is not my fault. I put pressure on him every round. Look, I still have all the belts. I am still the champion." Álvarez felt as though he won the fight, saying "In the first rounds, I came out to see what he had. Then I was building from there. I think I won eight rounds. I felt that I won the fight. "I think I was superior in the ring. I won at least seven or eight rounds. I was able to counterpunch and made Gennady wobble at least three times. If we fight again, it's up to the people. I feel frustrated over my draw." Golovkin's trainer Abel Sanchez believed judge Byrd had her scorecard filled out before the first bell rang.

Álvarez ruled out another fight in 2017, claiming he would return on Cinco de Mayo weekend in May 2018. At the post-fight press conference, Álvarez said through a translator, "Look, right now I wanna rest. Whatever the fans want, whatever the people want and ask for, we’ll do. You know that's my style. But right now, who knows if it's in May or September? But one thing's for sure – this is my era, the era of Canelo." Golovkin's promoter Tom Loeffler stated that they would like an immediate rematch, but Golovkin, who prefers fighting at least three times in a calendar year, reiterated his desire to also fight in December.

=== Reception ===
The fight surpassed Mayweather-Álvarez to achieve the third highest gate in boxing history. ESPN reported the fight generated $27,059,850 from 17,318 tickets sold. 934 complimentary tickets were given out, according to the NSAC. Mayweather vs. Álvarez sold 16,146 tickets to produce a live gate of $20,003,150.

The replay, which took place a week later on HBO averaged 726,000, peaking at 840,000 viewers. The LA Times reported the fight generated 1.3 million domestic PPV buys. Although HBO didn't make an official announcement, it is believed that the revenue would exceed $100 million.

== Fight card ==
Confirmed bouts:

Weight class		vs.		Type	Round	Time	Notes
Middleweight	Canelo Álvarez	vs.	Gennady Golovkin (c)	SD	12/12
Featherweight	Joseph Diaz	def.	Rafael Rivera	UD	12/12
Super bantamweight	Diego De La Hoya	def.	Randy Caballero	UD	10/10
Lightweight	Ryan Martin	def.	Francisco Rojo	SD	10/10

== International broadcasting ==
Country	Broadcaster
Argentina	Space
Australia	Main Event
Brazil	Fox Sports
Brunei	Astro PPV
Canada	Canal Indigo
Chile	Chilevision; Space
Denmark	ViaPlay
Finland	ViaPlay
France	beIN Sports
Germany	DAZN
Indonesia	tvOne
Ireland	BoxNation Box Office
Israel	Sport 1
Japan	WOWOW Prime
Kazakhstan	Qazaqstan; Qazsport
Malaysia	Astro PPV
Mexico	TV Azteca; Televisa
New Zealand	SKY Arena
Norway	ViaPlay
Panama	RPC-TV
Philippines	Cignal PPV; SkyCable PPV
Poland	Polsat Sport
Qatar	beIN Sports
Singapore	SuperSports
South Africa	SuperSport
Spain	beIN CONNECT; Opensport
Sweden	ViaPlay
Thailand	True Sport
Turkey	TV8,5
Ukraine	XSPORT Online
United Kingdom	BoxNation Box Office
United States	HBO PPV
Uzbekistan	Uzreport TV

== Rematch ==
The controversial outcome prompted near-immediate discussions over the possibility of a rematch. Álvarez stated he would next fight in May 2018, whereas Golovkin was open to fighting in December 2017. ESPN reported that Álvarez, who only had the rematch clause in his contract, had to invoke it within three weeks of their fight. On September 19, Golden Boy Promotions president Eric Gomez told ESPN that everyone on their side was interested in the rematch and they would hold discussions with Tom Loeffler in the next coming days. Ringtv reported that the negotiations would begin on September 22. On September 24, Gomez said that the fight would likely take place in the first week of May 2018, but left the possibility of it occurring as early as March.

At its 55th annual convention in Baku, Azerbaijan on October 2, the WBC officially ordered a rematch. Golden Boy president Eric Gomez told ESPN that "regardless of if they did or didn't order the rematch, we are going to try to make it happen. We'll do whatever it takes to make it happen." On November 7, Eric Gomez indicated the negotiations were going well and Álvarez would make a decision in regards to the rematch in the coming weeks. It was believed that Golden Boy would wait until after David Lemieux and Billy Joe Saunders fought for the latter's WBO title on December 16, 2017, before making a decision. On November 15, Eddie Hearn, promoter of Daniel Jacobs, stated that he had approached Tom Loeffler regarding a possible rematch between Golovkin and Jacobs if the Álvarez-Golovkin rematch fails to take place.

On December 20, Eric Gomez announced that the negotiations were close to being finalized after Álvarez gave Golden Boy the go-ahead to write up the contracts. On January 29, 2018, HBO finally announced the rematch would take place on May 5, 2018. Both fighters said that this time the judges would not be needed, with both men promising to knock the other out. Facing a competing bid from New York City's Madison Square Garden, the rematch was booked to once again be held at T-Mobile Arena. According to the WBC, unlike the first bout, Álvarez would fight for their title.

The fate of the rematch was put in jeopardy on March 5, 2018, when Álvarez tested positive in two random urine tests for the banned substance clenbuterol. The NAC opened an investigation, and Álvarez was temporarily suspended on March 23, 2018—pending a hearing on April 10. In the hearing, Álvarez will face the possibility of a one-year suspension. Loeffler stated that Golovkin intended to fight on May 5, regardless of his opponent. Former two-time light middleweight champion Demetrius Andrade made an offer to fight if Álvarez received a long-term suspension, as well as IBF #1 contender Sergiy Derevyanchenko.

On March 29, 2018, NAC chief Bob Bennett filed a formal doping complaint against Álvarez, which delayed the disciplinary hearing to the commission's next monthly meeting on April 18. ESPN.com writer Dan Rafael felt that this delay made it more uncertain that the fight would not go ahead, while T-Mobile Arena announced that it would offer full refunds on tickets. On April 3, 2018, Alvarez officially withdrew from the fight. Gomez explained that "given the current regulations in Nevada we have been advised, and it is unfortunate, that Canelo won't be cleared to fight in May. We are hopeful this matter will be resolved and we are hoping Canelo will be cleared so we can reschedule the fight for August or September."

During the hearing, Álvarez was given a six-month suspension. As suspensions are retroactive from the date that the first positive test was collected (February 17, 2018), the suspension ends August 17, 2018. On June 13, 2018, Álvarez and Golovkin agreed to a new deal to hold the rematch.

Preceded by vs. Julio César Chávez Jr.	Canelo Álvarez's bouts 16 September 2017	Succeeded by vs. Gennady Golovkin II
Preceded by vs. Daniel Jacobs	Gennady Golovkin's bouts 16 September 2017	Succeeded by vs. Vanes Martirosyan
Awards
Previous: The death of Muhammad Ali	The Ring Event of the Year; 2017	Next: HBO leaves boxing
