= Hugo Ruiz =

Mexican boxer

Personal information
- Nickname: Cuatito
- Born: Hugo Federico Ruiz Domínguez; September 21, 1988 (age 38) Los Mochis, Mexico
- Height: 5 ft 9 in (175 cm)
- Weight: Super flyweight; Bantamweight; Super bantamweight; Super featherweight

Boxing career
- Reach: 69 in (175 cm)
- Stance: Orthodox

Boxing record
- Total fights: 44
- Wins: 39
- Win by KO: 33
- Losses: 5

Hugo Ruiz Dominguez (born September 21, 1988) is a Mexican professional boxer. He is the former WBC Super bantamweight world champion.

== Professional career ==
In September 2010, Ruiz beat the veteran Jesús Vázquez to win the WBC Continental Americas super flyweight championship, the bout was held at the Arena Solidaridad, in Monterrey, Nuevo León, Mexico.

=== WBA bantamweight championship (interim) ===
On January 22, 2011, Ruiz won a technical ninth-round decision over Nicaraguan Álvaro Pérez to capture the interim WBA bantamweight title. He would go to fight for the Regular title against Japanese boxer Kōki Kameda but would lose via split decision.

=== WBC super bantamweight title fight (interim) ===
In 2016, Ruiz beat fellow countryman Julio Ceja in a rematch to win the WBC Super bantamweight title. He would end up losing the title in his first defense against Japanese boxer Hozumi Hasegawa.

==== Ruiz vs. Guevara ====
On 19 January 2019, Ruiz beat Alberto Guevara by unanimous decision in their 10-round contest The scorecards read 99–90, 100–89, 99–90 in favor of Ruiz.

==== Ruiz vs. Davis ====
In his next bout, Ruiz faced WBA super featherweight champion Gervonta Davis. Ruiz was ranked as the #8 super feathwerweight in the world by the WBA. Davis cornered Ruiz from the opening bell, and was able to crack his guard towards the end of the round and drop him with a left hook. Ruiz made the count, but the referee decided to end the fight, awarding Davis with a first-round knockout victory.

== Professional boxing record ==
44 fights	39 wins	5 losses
By knockout	33	4
By decision	6	1

No.	Result	Record	Opponent	Type	Round, time	Date	Location	Notes
44	Loss	39–5	Gervonta Davis	KO	1 (12), 2:59	Feb 9, 2019	Dignity Health Sports Park, Carson, California, U.S.	For WBA (Super) super featherweight title
43	Win	39–4	Alberto Guevara	UD	10	Jan 19, 2019	MGM Grand Garden Arena, Paradise, Nevada, U.S.	
42	Win	38–4	Jesus Galicia	KO	2 (10), 0:35	Nov 17, 2018	Gimnasio Miguel Hidalgo, Puebla, Mexico	
41	Win	37–4	Dennis Contreras	UD	8	Aug 11, 2018	Mexico City Arena, Mexico City, Mexico	
40	Loss	36–4	Hozumi Hasegawa	RTD	9 (12), 3:00	Sep 16, 2016	Osaka Prefectural Gymnasium, Osaka, Japan	Lost WBC super bantamweight title
39	Win	36–3	Julio Ceja	TKO	1 (12), 0:51	Feb 27, 2016	Honda Center, Anaheim, California, U.S.	Won WBC super bantamweight title
38	Loss	35–3	Julio Ceja	TKO	5 (12), 2:34	Aug 29, 2015	Staples Center, Los Angeles, California, U.S.	For WBC interim super bantamweight title
37	Win	35–2	Carlos Medellin	TKO	1 (8), 2:08	Nov 22, 2014	Plaza de los Martíres, Toluca, Mexico	
36	Win	34–2	Ramon Maas	TKO	1 (10), 2:50	Mar 22, 2014	Polideportivo Centenario, Los Mochis, Mexico	
35	Win	33–2	Julio César Miranda	MD	12	Sep 7, 2013	Casino, Apodaca, Mexico	Won WBC Continental Americas bantamweight title
34	Win	32–2	Giovanni Caro	TKO	2 (10), 1:22	Jun 1, 2013	Centro Civico de Ecatepec, Ecatepec, Mexico	
33	Loss	31–2	Kōki Kameda	SD	12	Dec 4, 2012	Osaka Prefectural Gymnasium, Osaka, Japan	For WBA (Regular) bantamweight title
32	Win	31–1	Jean Sampson	KO	9 (12), 3:02	Jul 7, 2012	Estadio de Beisbol Arturo C. Nahl, La Paz, Mexico	Retained WBA interim bantamweight title
31	Win	30–1	Yonfrez Parejo	TKO	8 (12), 1:12	Mar 31, 2012	Gimnasio Auditorio, Los Cabos, Mexico	Retained WBA interim bantamweight title
30	Win	29–1	Francisco Arce Armenta	TKO	4 (12), 0:24	Oct 15, 2011	Estadio Centenario, Los Mochis, Mexico	Retained WBA interim bantamweight title
29	Win	28–1	Francisco Arce Armenta	UD	12	May 14, 2011	Polideportivo Centenario, Los Mochis, Mexico	Retained WBA interim bantamweight title
28	Win	27–1	Alvaro Perez	TD	9 (12)	Jan 22, 2011	Arena Neza, Ciudad Nezahualcóyotl, Mexico	Won WBA interim bantamweight title
27	Win	26–1	Jesus Vazquez	UD	10	Sep 4, 2010	Arena Solidaridad, Monterrey, Mexico	Won WBC Continental Americas super-flyweight title
26	Win	25–1	Cesar Ricardo Martinez	TKO	2 (8), 0:17	Jun 19, 2010	Mesón de los Deportes, Tepic, Mexico	
25	Win	24–1	Germán Meraz	TKO	7 (12), 1:22	Apr 3, 2010	Coliseo Olimpico de la UG, Guadalajara, Mexico	Won WBO Latino super-flyweight title
24	Win	23–1	Francisco Reyes	TKO	3 (10)	Feb 13, 2010	Gimnasio Auditorio, Los Cabos, Mexico	
23	Win	22–1	Fred Heberto Valdez	KO	4 (10)	Nov 13, 2009	Polideportivo Centenario, Los Mochis, Mexico	
22	Win	21–1	Jose Tamayo	KO	8	Sep 25, 2009	Polideportivo Centenario, Los Mochis, Mexico	
21	Win	20–1	Esau Gaona	TKO	7 (12)	Jun 12, 2009	Polideportivo Centenario, Los Mochis, Mexico	
20	Win	19–1	Felipe Acosta	KO	2 (6)	Apr 3, 2009	Polideportivo Centenario, Los Mochis, Mexico	
19	Win	18–1	Ernesto Ochoa	TKO	2 (4)	Feb 28, 2009	Polideportivo Centenario, Los Mochis, Mexico	
18	Win	17–1	Hugo Cruz	KO	1 (4)	Dec 12, 2008	Salon Forum, Los Mochis, Mexico	
17	Win	16–1	Jose Carlos Vargas	TKO	1 (6)	Nov 2, 2008	La Feria de San Marcos, Aguascalientes, Mexico	
16	Win	15–1	Carlos Balmea	KO	2 (6)	Jun 14, 2008	Auditorio Benito Juarez, Los Mochis, Mexico	
15	Win	14–1	Raul Ruiz	KO	1 (4)	Apr 18, 2008	Auditorio Benito Juarez, Los Mochis, Mexico	
14	Win	13–1	Daniel Contreras Jr.	KO	1 (4)	Feb 22, 2008	Parque Revolucion, Culiacan, Mexico	
13	Win	12–1	Eduardo Gutierrez	TKO	3 (4)	Feb 8, 2008	Auditorio Benito Juarez, Los Mochis, Mexico	
12	Win	11–1	Jose Alvarez	KO	1 (4)	Jan 25, 2008	Auditorio Benito Juarez, Los Mochis, Mexico	
11	Win	10–1	Jesus Cota	TKO	1 (4)	Dec 14, 2007	Polideportivo Centenario, Los Mochis, Mexico	
10	Loss	9–1	Enrique Quevedo	TKO	4 (6)	Oct 27, 2007	Centro de Espectáculos Promocasa, Mexicali, Mexico	
9	Win	9–0	Martin Jocobi	TKO	1 (4)	Sep 28, 2007	Salon Eventos Modelo, Guasave, Mexico	
8	Win	8–0	Raul Ruiz	KO	1 (4)	Sep 14, 2007	Centro de Espectáculos Promocasa, Mexicali, Mexico	
7	Win	7–0	Jacobo Cinco Valenzuela	TKO	1 (6)	Aug 10, 2007	Polideportivo Centenario, Los Mochis, Mexico	
6	Win	6–0	Trinidad Ruiz	TKO	1 (4)	Jul 27, 2007	Salon Eventos Modelo, Guasave, Mexico	
5	Win	5–0	Noe Flores	KO	1 (4)	Jul 14, 2007	Explanada Tecate, Ciudad Obregon, Mexico	
4	Win	4–0	Mauro Gonzalez	KO	1 (4)	Jun 29, 2007	Auditorio Benito Juarez, Los Mochis, Mexico	
3	Win	3–0	Rigoberto Casillas	TKO	1 (4)	May 12, 2007	Agua Caliente Racetrack, Tijuana, Mexico	
2	Win	2–0	Martin Jocobi	TKO	1 (4)	Mar 30, 2007	Polideportivo Centenario, Los Mochis, Mexico	
1	Win	1–0	Noe Flores	TKO	1 (4)	Dec 22, 2006	Polideportivo Centenario, Los Mochis, Mexico	

== See also ==
- List of Mexican boxing world champions
- List of world super-bantamweight boxing champions

Sporting positions
Regional boxing titles
Vacant Title last held by Everth Briceno	WBO Latino super-flyweight champion April 3, 2010 – 2010; Vacated	Vacant Title next held by William Urina
Vacant Title last held by Juan José Montes	WBC Continental Americas super-flyweight champion April 3, 2010 – 2011; Vacated	Vacant Title next held by Carlos Cuadras
Vacant Title last held by Carlos Cuadras	WBC Continental Americas bantamweight champion April 3, 2010 – 2011; Vacated	Vacant Title next held by Luis Nery
World boxing titles
Vacant Title last held by Nehomar Cermeño	WBA bantamweight champion Interim title January 22, 2011 – December 4, 2012; Lost bid for full title	Vacant Title next held by Yonfrez Parejo
Preceded by Julio Ceja	WBC super-bantamweight champion February 27, 2016 – September 16, 2016	Succeeded by Hozumi Hasegawa
