= Léo Santa Cruz =

Mexican boxer (born 1988)

Personal information
- Nicknames: El Terremoto ("The Earthquake")
- Born: Léodegario Santa Cruz; 10 August 1988 (age 38) Huetamo, Michoacán, Mexico
- Height: 5 ft 7 1/2 in (171 cm)
- Weight: Bantamweight; Super bantamweight; Featherweight; Super featherweight; Lightweight

Boxing career
- Reach: 69 in (175 cm)
- Stance: Orthodox

Boxing record
- Total fights: 41
- Wins: 38
- Win by KO: 19
- Losses: 2
- Draws: 1

Léodegario Santa Cruz (born 10 August 1988) is a Mexican professional boxer. He is a four-weight world champion, having held the IBF bantamweight title from 2012 to 2013, the WBC super bantamweight title from 2013 to 2015, the WBA (Super) featherweight title twice between 2015 and 2022, and the WBA (Super) super featherweight title from 2019 to 2020.

== Amateur career ==
As an amateur, Santa Cruz compiled a record of 148 wins and 7 losses.

== Professional career ==
=== Bantamweight ===
==== Early years ====
Santa Cruz made his professional debut, at the age of 18 on 13 October 2006 against Mexican boxer Pedro Silva, winning the fight via knockout in round 2. After drawing his second bout in January 2007 against Rodrigo Hernandez, Santa Cruz went on to win his next thirteen fights, with five coming by stoppage. On 21 October 2010 Santa Cruz beat the veteran James Owens at the Martin's Valley Mansion in Cockeysville, Maryland. In March 2011, Santa Cruz knocked out the veteran Stephane Jamoye to win the vacant WBC Youth bantamweight championship.

==== Santa Cruz vs. Malinga ====
In April 2012, promoter Branco Milenkovic announced that a deal was set for Santa Cruz to fight South African boxer Vusi Malinga (20–3–1, 12 KOs) for the vacant IBF bantamweight title. The fight was slated for 2 June at the Home Depot Center in Carson, California. The IBF title was left vacant when then-champion Abner Mares moved up in weight. Santa Cruz beat Malinga via unanimous decision to win the IBF bantamweight title. The bout was televised on a Showtime boxing card. Two judges scored Santa Cruz the clear winner with scorecards of 120–108 and the third judge gave Malinga one round, scoring the fight 119–109. The fight started off with both boxers trying to out land each other, with Santa Cruz landing the cleaner and power shots. Malinga was hurt numerous times during the fight, but kept coming forward.

==== Santa Cruz vs. Morel ====
In August 2012, it was announced that Santa Cruz would make the first defence of his IBF title on the undercard of Saul Álvarez vs. Josesito López on 15 September at the MGM Grand Garden Arena in Paradise, Nevada. His first defence was rumoured to be against former two-time world champion Eric Morel (46–3, 23 KOs). On fight night, Santa Cruz wore down Morel with body shots, dominating the fight from the opening bell, forcing Morel to quit on his stool before round 6 began. CompuBox stats showed that Santa Cruz landed 66% of his power punches. In total, over five rounds, Santa Cruz landed 277 punches of 509 thrown (54%) and Morel landed 73 of his 344 thrown (21%).

==== Santa Cruz vs. Zaleta ====
On 29 October 2012 a deal was reached for Santa Cruz to make a second defence of his IBF title at the Staples Center in Los Angeles against Mexican boxer Victor Zaleta (20–2–1, 10 KOs) on a double header featuring WBC super bantamweight champion Abner Mares vs. Anselmo Moreno on 10 November. The card was to be shown live on Showtime. Santa Cruz dropped Zaleta three times en route to a TKO victory in round 9 to retain his IBF title. Santa Cruz started the fight the better boxer and began working the body immediately. Zaleta was dropped following a body shot in round 4, again in round 7 following a combination of shots to the head and body and the final knockdown in round 9, again from a combination forced the referee to stop the fight.

==== Santa Cruz vs. Guevara ====
On 2 December 2012 Golden Boy Promotions announced a double-header which would take place on CBS at the Los Angeles Sports Arena on 15 December where Santa Cruz would make his third defence in four months against unbeaten Mexican boxer Alberto Guevara (16–0, 6 KOs). The last time CBS aired live boxing was 15 years prior in January 1997 when Bernard Hopkins stopped Glen Johnson. The fight was one-sided as Santa Cruz went on to win a unanimous decision to retain his IBF title. Santa Cruz, who was known to have a high punch output did not throw as much as his previous bouts but did enough for the three judges to score the fight 116–112, 118–110, and 119–109 in his favour. Santa Cruz explained the reason for the lower output was because he felt he had fought a lot recently. According to CompuBox Stats, Santa Cruz landed 291 of 989 punches thrown (29%) and Guevara landed 158 of his 793 thrown (20%). Santa Cruz finished the year with 5 wins including 3 title defenses.

On 12 February 2013, Santa Cruz vacated his IBF bantamweight belt to move up to junior featherweight.

=== Super bantamweight ===
Santa Cruz had his first fight at the super bantamweight limit on the undercard of the Floyd Mayweather Jr. vs. Robert Guerrero Showtime Pay-Per-View on 5 May 2013 at the MGM Grand in Las Vegas. The fight was officially announced in March along with the rest of the undercard. Santa Cruz was originally scheduled to fight Rafael Márquez, but he pulled out due to injury. Venezuelan veteran, former super flyweight world champion Alexander Muñoz (36–4, 28 KOs) stepped in. Santa Cruz won the vacant NABF super bantamweight title after stopping Muñoz in round 5. The fight started out with both boxers trading blow, but it was Santa Cruz who was landing the harder and cleaner shots. Muñoz was dropped at the end of round 3 and then nearly went down again in the next round. After taking more punishment from the bigger Santa Cruz, Muñoz's trainer stopped the fight. Santa Cruz landed 52% of his total punches thrown which included 57 body shots.

==== Santa Cruz vs. Terrazas ====
On 18 June 2013 Golden Boy announced that Santa Cruz was the mandatory challenger with the WBC and would challenge Mexican boxer Victor Terrazas (37–2–1, 21 KOs) for his WBC super bantamweight title at the StubHub Center in Carson, California on 24 August. The fight would mark Terrazas' first title defence since winning the then-vacant title in April 2013 against Cristian Mijares. Golden Boy won the rights to promote the fight at the purse bids when they bid $526,000, more than the $451,000 which came from Zanfer Promotions. With Terrazas the champion, due 75%, meaning he would come out with $368,200 and Santa Cruz will get remaining $157,800. Santa Cruz beat Terrazas via a 3rd-round TKO to become a two-weight world champion. Santa Cruz started off quick immediately forcing Terrazas to fight on the back foot. Terrazas was able to fight back but was getting hit a lot in the process. By the end of round 2, Terrazas' right eye began to close due to the offence output of Santa Cruz. In round 3, Santa Cruz dropped Terrazas twice and although he beat the count each time, the referee waved off the fight after the second knockdown. Santa Cruz landed 78 of 267 punches thrown (29%) and Terrazas landed 33 of his 156 thrown (21%). Santa Cruz was credited with landed 33 power shots in round 2.

==== Santa Cruz vs. Seda ====
Golden Boy initially tried to make Santa Cruz vs. Cristian Mijares for 2 November however negotiations broke down on 9 October. Instead a new deal was being formed for Santa Cruz to make his first voluntary defence against Cesar Seda (25–1, 17 KOs) on 14 December at the MGM Grand in Las Vegas, Nevada on the undercard of the Showtime PPV Marcos Maidana vs. Adrien Broner for the WBA welterweight title. The card was later taken off PPV, but would still be aired on Showtime and would take place at the Alamodome in San Antonio, Texas. Santa Cruz knocked Seda down once in the fifth-round as he went on to win a unanimous decision when the three judges scored it 117–110, 116–111, 115–112 in his favor. Despite the win, Santa Cruz was disappointing with his performance. CompuBox Stats showed that Santa Cruz landed 297 of 829 punches thrown (36%) and Seda landed 170 of his 649 thrown (26%)

==== Santa Cruz vs. Mijares ====
On 9 January 2014 it was announced that Santa Cruz would finally meet veteran Mexican contender Cristian Mijares (49–7–2, 24 KOs), also his mandatory challenger at the MGM Grand Garden Arena in Paradise, Nevada on 8 March, defending his WBC title. The fight would take place on the PPV undercard of Canelo vs. Angulo. For the fight, Santa Cruz would earn $500,000 and Mijares had a $92,000 purse. The fight went the distance as Santa Cruz won on all three judges scorecards (120–108, 120–108, 119–109). Santa Cruz showed respect in the post fight interview to Mijares, who he looked up to before he won his first world title, "Mijares is a great boxer. I came to do what I had to do to win. Mijares had great experience. He's a lefty. I had to be ready. We practiced everything to put on a great fight." Santa Cruz landed 371 of 1043 punches thrown (36%) and Mijares landed 132 of his 574 thrown (23%).

==== Santa Cruz vs. Roman, Ruiz ====
Santa Cruz made his next defence on 13 September at the MGM Grand on the Mayweather-Maidana II undercard against Mexican boxer Manuel Roman (17–2–3, 6 KOs) . He stopped Roman in round two to retain his world title. After the fight, Santa Cruz said, "I did my job. That's what I came for. I'm not scared of anyone. I want Rigondeaux and I want my manager [Al Haymon] to make the fight to show I am the best."

Three months later on 17 January 2015 Santa Cruz defended his WBC super bantamweight title against Jesus Ruiz (33–5–5, 22 KOs) at the MGM Grand Garden Arena. The fight was announced a month earlier. Santa Cruz was criticized for fighting another low-level regarded opponent prior to the fight. Santa Cruz landed 277 punches to 120 by Ruiz, landing powerful head shots to force the stoppage 29 seconds into the 8th round. At the time of stoppage, Santa Cruz was ahead on all three judges scorecards (69–63, 69–64, 69–64). Santa Cruz earned a purse of $750,000 compared to Ruiz's $50,000. He then defended himself in the post-fight interview, "It was a war, but we came prepared. He gave me a tough fight. We went after him and stopped him. I know he was prepared."

=== Featherweight ===
Santa Cruz moved up to featherweight and fought his first fight on 2 May 2015. His opponent was announced as Mexican Jose Cayetano (17–3, 8 KOs) in a scheduled 10 round bout on the Mayweather vs. Pacquiao super fight undercard at the MGM Grand Arena. Santa Cruz won every round on all three judges scorecards (100–90, 3 times). Still undefeated, Santa Cruz boasted a record of 30 wins, no losses and 1 draw, with 17 inside the distance.

==== Santa Cruz vs. Mares ====
On 3 July 2015 a deal was finally reached for Santa Cruz to challenge fellow Southern Californian Abner Mares (29–1–1, 15 KOs) for the vacant WBA (Super) featherweight and vacant WBC Diamond featherweight titles on 29 August at the Staples Center in Los Angeles. Premier Boxing Champions confirmed the bout would take place on ESPN. Santa Cruz won the fight via majority decision in a potential fight of the year candidate to win the vacant titles. With the win, Santa Cruz became a three-weight world champion. 13,109 fans were in attendance at the Staples Center. Judge Max Deluca had it a draw at 114–114 whilst judges Jesse Reyes and Steve Morrow scored it 117–111 for Santa Cruz. "I was surprised Abner came out so strong. He came right at me but we figured him out and we got the win. I stayed outside with the jab. We were able to take control.", said Santa Cruz in the post fight interview. The whole card averaged 1.217 million on ESPN and peaked towards the end at 1.641 million viewers. The figures were recorded as the highest on ESPN since 1998. The bout was also televised on Spanish-only network ESPN Deportes and averaged 355,000 viewers, another record.

==== Santa Cruz vs. Martínez ====
In January 2016, Showtime announced they would televise Santa Cruz's first defence against Kiko Martínez (35–6, 26 KOs), scheduled to take place on 28 February at the Honda Center in Anaheim, California. For the fight, Martínez replaced usual trainer Gabriel Sarmiento with well-known trainer Robert García. Santa Cruz successfully retained his title by defeating Martínez via fifth-round TKO. Martínez was knocked down twice in Round 1, but beat the referee's count and continued to back Santa Cruz up in an entertaining slugfest. Both fighters combined threw over 1,000 punches in less than five full rounds. Santa Cruz hurt Martínez in round 5 when he cornered him and hurt him with right hands. Santa Cruz continued with a series of combinations until referee Raul Caiz Sr. jumped in at 2:09 as Martínez stopped throwing back. Santa Cruz landed 55% of his power punches.

==== Santa Cruz vs. Frampton I, II ====
On 22 April 2016 negotiations were complete for Santa Cruz to defend his WBA (super) featherweight title against Carl Frampton (22–0, 14 KOs), who was moving up from super bantamweight on 30 July 2016 at the Barclays Center in Brooklyn. In a potential fight of the year candidate, Santa Cruz lost his title to Frampton via a 12-round majority decision win before a crowd of 9,062. One judge scored it a 114–114 draw but the others made Frampton the winner, 116–112 and 117–111. Frampton had a higher accuracy rate, despite both fighters landing equal numbers of punches. According to CompuBox stats, Frampton landed 242 of 668 punches (36 percent), whilst Santa Cruz connected on 255 of 1,002 blows (25 percent). In the post fight, Frampton said he wanted to defend the title in his home city and did not want to rule out a rematch. The fight averaged 480,000 and peaked at 549,000 viewers.

A rematch was confirmed between Santa Cruz and Frampton in October to take place. Originally discussed to take place at Frampton's hometown of Belfast, the venue was confirmed to be at the MGM Grand in Las Vegas on 28 January 2017. 10,085 were in attendance as Santa Cruz regained his title with a majority decision (114–114, 115–113, 115–113). Santa Cruz and Frampton immediately discussed interest in a third fight, possibly in Frampton's hometown of Belfast. Frampton earned a purse of $1 million compared to $900,000 that Santa Cruz received. In the post-fight, Santa Cruz said, "Before the fight I said I wanted revenge and I wanted to work hard. I went to the gym and I worked hard, and I did what I had to do. Carl Frampton is a good fighter. Let's make it a third fight!" Frampton only landed 133 of his 592 punches thrown (22%) whereas Santa Cruz landed 230 of his 884 thrown (26%). Nielsen Media Research reported the fight averaged 587,000 and peaked at 643,000 viewers.

==== Santa Cruz vs. Avalos ====
On 3 April 2017 the World Boxing Association ordered a rematch between Santa Cruz and their "regular" champion Abner Mares (30–2–1, 15 KOs). This was done as part of WBA's ongoing plan to reduce the number of world titles. Mares became mandatory challenger and "regular" titleholder after winning a split decision against Argentine boxer Jesus Cuellar in December 2016. Due to the negotiations taking too long, the WBA ordered a deal be made by 11 July 2017 or the fight would go to purse bids on 21 July. The fight was supposedly set for 9 September at the Staples Center, but nothing materialized. Due to the Srisaket Sor Rungvisai–Roman González rematch taking place on the 9 September at the Stubhub Center in Carson, AEG, who own both venues said they would push the Santa Cruz-Mares rematch back to take place on 7 October instead. On 18 August, it was announced that negotiations had broken down.

On 25 August, Mares told Ringtv that he and Santa Cruz would still appear on the same card on 14 October on Fox. The fight would take place in the afternoon, on the same card Jermell Charlo defends his WBC light middleweight title against Erickson Lubin in the evening on Showtime. Advisor Al Haymon re-assured Mares that a rematch with Santa Cruz would still take place. On 30 August, it was announced that Santa Cruz's opponent would be Chris Avalos, while Mares would fight Andrés Gutiérrez. Avalos came into the fight with a 2–3 record in his last 5 fights since 2015.

In a one-sided beatdown, Santa Cruz stopped Avalos in the eighth round. The end came with Santa Cruz piling hurtful power shots on Avalos, when referee Thomas Taylor had seen enough, he stepped in at 1 minute, 34 seconds. Avalos never got started in the fight, which was all Santa Cruz. After a slow start in the opening round, Santa Cruz began to pick his power shots to the head and body. Avalos connected on his own shots, but lacked the power to hurt Santa Cruz. Avalos was not happy with the stoppage, "I'm very upset with the stoppage. We were fighting the whole time. There was no reason to stop this fight. I wasn't hurt like the referee thought. I want to fight for the title again." Santa Cruz spoke about the game plan for the fight saying, "At the beginning, I wasn't doing what my corner was telling me. I was trying to please the fans. I wanted to give [the fans] a brawl, a toe-to-toe, my dad said, 'What are you doing, you are supposed to beat him from the outside' – and that's what we did in the later rounds." CompuBox stats showed exactly how the fight went with Santa Cruz landing 281 of 692 punches thrown (41%) and Avalos landing 169 of 751 thrown (23%). Mares was also victorious in his fight, setting up a rematch between himself and Santa Cruz. The card averaged 1,483,000 viewers on Fox.

==== Santa Cruz vs. Mares II ====
Soon after stopping Avalos, talks re-emerged for the Santa Cruz vs. Mares fight. In December 2017, Ringstar Promotions' Richard Schaefer stated it's a fight both fighters wanted and the only detail to discuss was finding the best venue and date for the fight. A strong candidate for hosting the fight was the Staples Center in Los Angeles, the venue of the first fight. On 24 January 2018 Showtime announced the fight would take place at the Staples Center on 9 June 2018. The fight was made official on 2 April. Santa Cruz defeated Mares via unanimous decision after 12 rounds to retain his WBA (Super) featherweight title. Santa Cruz outworked Mares using his powerful jab, right hand and left hooks. Mares connected with nice shots, but Santa Cruz was the busier boxer and continued to land the more powerful shots to win the rounds. The three judges Rey Danseco of the Philippines, Steve Weisfeld, and Zac Young both of the United States scored the fight 115–113, 116–112 and 117–111, respectively, in favor of Santa Cruz. After the fight, Santa Cruz expressed interest in fighting WBC featherweight champion Gary Russell Jr. in a unification fight. He said "It was a great fight – another war. I had to be smarter. ... Abner is a great fighter. He left his heart out there." He then added, "Hopefully I am [the best featherweight in the world]. But I leave it to the fans to say who is the best. ... I want Gary Russell. Let's unify. I'm not scared of anybody." According to CompuBox, Santa Cruz landed 357 of 1061 punches (34%) and Mares landed 208 of 931 (22%). CompuBox reported for the two fights combined, Santa Cruz landed 730 of 2115 punched thrown (35%) and Mares landed 434 of his 1908 thrown (23%). Combined they landed 1164 of a total 4023 punches thrown (29%) over the 24 rounds.

For the bout, Santa Cruz reportedly earned $1 million and Mares earned a $750,000 purse. The fight averaged 600,000 on Showtime and peaked at 633,000 viewers. These numbers were much lower than their first bout, however that bout was aired on ESPN.

==== Santa Cruz vs. Rivera ====
In November 2018, PBC and FOX announced that Santa Cruz would defend his WBA title against Miguel Flores on 16 February 2019. A month later, the Microsoft Theater in Los Angeles was confirmed as the venue. However, Flores was forced to withdraw from the fight after suffering an ankle injury in camp. Rafael Rivera was confirmed as the replacement on 24 January. Rafael Rivera was ranked #11 by the WBA at featherweight. Santa Cruz won the bout via unanimous decision, with all three judges scoring it 119–109.

=== Super Featherweight ===
==== Santa Cruz vs. Flores ====
On 26 August 2019, Santa Cruz confirmed that he was planning on moving up to the super featherweight division. In late September, it was revealed that a fight with Miguel Flores was in the works for the vacant WBA (Super) super featherweight title. The match was ultimately confirmed and placed on the main card of Wilder vs. Ortiz II on 23 November. Despite a subpar performance, Santa Cruz managed to outwork Flores and won via unanimous decision with two judges scoring the bout 117–110 and a third scoring it 115–112. In his post-fight interview, Santa Cruz called out Gary Russell and stated that he'd be willing to move up to lightweight for a potential fight with Gervonta Davis.

==== Santa Cruz vs. Davis ====
In April 2020, Santa Cruz revealed he planned on fighting Gervonta Davis (23–0, 22 KOs) at 130 pounds. In May, Leonard Ellerbe announced that Davis and Santa Cruz had agreed on terms to fight later in the year. In July, Showtime announced the boxers would headline a PPV event on October 24 at Mohegan Sun Arena in Uncasville, Connecticut. Fans were not permitted to attend; however, there was potential for the venue to be moved to the West Coast if COVID-19 policies allowed. Santa Cruz stated he actively sought the bout against Davis through adviser Al Haymon, after facing criticism in recent years for the quality of his opposition. He collected the WBA (super) super featherweight title after defeating Miguel Flores in November 2019, the same belt Davis vacated. The card aired live on Channel 5 in the UK. Davis was moving back down in weight for the fight, however, his lightweight title would also be at stake along with Santa Cruz's super featherweight belt. The weight limit set for the fight was 130 pounds. In preparation for the fight, which was a big challenge for him, Santa Cruz sparred welterweights. This was to prepare for Davis's power and size advantage. Although Santa Cruz had a height advantage of two inches over Davis, Davis was expected to be the more powerful and physically imposing fighter. Santa Cruz was given little chance of beating Davis. Teofimo Lopez called Davis "sad", stating he could be fighting boxers at lightweight instead. Despite the rumours surrounding Davis's weight issues, Santa Cruz had no concern regarding Davis making the contracted weight. He believed Davis would meet the requirement because of the financial penalties involved if he failed to do so. The penalty was in place for both boxers. Santa Cruz indicated the fines would motivate Davis to comply with the weight condition. Speaking in third person, Davis told Brian Custer, “Gervonta Davis definitely will make the weight.”

On October 1, the event was rescheduled to take place a week later on October 31, and the location was changed to the Alamodome in San Antonio, Texas. The move was done to allow fans to attend the event and allowed seven more days for tickets to sell. With it being his PPV headliner, Ellerbe said there was no turning back from this, and claimed Davis would now move forward as a PPV star. Davis weighed in at 129.8 pounds, whilst Santa Cruz weighed 129.6 pounds.

In front of 9,024 socially distanced fans in attendance, Davis defeated Santa Cruz via sixth-round knockout, successfully capturing the WBA (Super) super featherweight title, while retaining his WBA lightweight belt, with Santa Cruz visibly shaken but recovering post-fight. From the opening round, Davis established dominance with his jab and counterpunching, while Santa Cruz responded with aggressive body shots and right hands. He landed a straight right at 2:05, which dropped Davis, but it was ruled a trip due to tangled legs. Heavy combinations were landed by both boxers in the fourth round. Santa Cruz accurately landed his right hands, and Davis landed a notable left uppercut. The pace slowed down in the fifth round. The end came in the sixth round after Davis cornered Santa Cruz and landed a perfectly timed left uppercut, knocking him down flat on his back. Referee Rafael Ramos stopped the fight immediately at 2 minutes and 40 seconds. Santa Cruz lay motionless for several seconds but eventually got back on his feet, marking Davis as the first fighter to stop Santa Cruz in his career.

During the post-fight, Davis said of Santa Cruz, “He’s a tough warrior, and he came to fight.” On the knockout, he said, “He punches, but he doesn’t try to get out of the way. There was nowhere for him to go on that knockout because I got him into the corner.” Santa Cruz, although clearly affected by the loss, recovered after the fight and was conscious post-knockout, showing sportsmanship. During post-fight press conference, he stated he was unsure what he would do next in his career, with retirement also a possibility. Notable boxers and analysts reacted positively to the fight and knockout blow.

At the time of the stoppage, Davis was leading on all three judges' scorecards by the identical margin, 48–47. Over the course of just under six rounds, Davis had been out-landed and out-thrown by his opponent despite being the more accurate boxer: he landed 84 of 227 punches thrown (37%), while Santa Cruz landed 97 of 390 thrown (25%). His knockout of Santa Cruz was selected as the winner of The Ring Magazine Knockout of The Year award for 2020. Prior to the fight, Mayweather was hoping the fight would attract around 1 million PPV buys, up to 2 million. The event reportedly sold around 225,000 PPV's.

==== WBA featherweight status ====
Following only his second professional defeat, Santa Cruz still held the WBA (Super) featherweight title. He last defended the belt in February 2019. British boxer Leigh Wood held the (regular) title. On 6 July 2021 he told reporters that would stay at the super featherweight division in hopes to land a fight with Gary Russell Jr. (31–0, 18 KOs) down the line. Eddie Hearn wanted to appeal to the WBA to strip Santa Cruz and elevate his boxer Wood to full championship status. He said, “They need to do is get Leo Santa Cruz out of the division and elevate him (Wood), because Santa Cruz hasn’t boxed in coming up to three years at featherweight. They keep saying he is going to come back down, but I don’t believe them.” Instead, in August 2021, the WBA ordered Wood to unify his regular title against newly crowned interim champion Michael Conlan, with the winner to then fight Santa Cruz. In December, the WBA set a deadline for Santa Cruz to inform them of his future plans. It had now been over a year since he last fought and coming up to three years since his last fight at featherweight.

==== Santa Cruz vs. Carbajal ====
On 19 December 2021 PBC announced a card, scheduled for 6 February 2022 on FOX Sports Pay-Per-View, headlined by Keith Thurman vs. Mario Barrios at the Michelob Ultra Arena in Paradise, Nevada. Santa Cruz was announced for the undercard as co-feature bout against Keenan Carbajal (23–2–1, 15 KOs) in a 12-round bout, which was later changed to 10 rounds. The WBA confirmed Santa Cruz's status as the WBA (super) champion was safe and that he agreed to fight the winner of Wood vs. Conlan. Santa Cruz came in at 128¾ pounds, while Keenan Carbajal weighed 129 pounds. Santa Cruz dominated Carbajal winning a 10-round unanimous decision. The scores were 100–90, 100–90, and 100–90. Santa Cruz kept throwing punches throughout the fight. This was despite an accidental clash of heads in the second round which formed a cut below his right eye, hindering his sight. Carbajal was cut over his left eye. Santa Cruz appeared to be briefly hurt in the ninth round. The scores were a 100–90 shutout on all three judges' cards. CompuBox showed Santa Cruz landing 250 of 796 punches thrown (31%) and Carbajal landed 139 of his 566 thrown (25%). With the win, Santa Cruz ended Carbajal's 18-fight winning streak, which dated back to 2015.

Despite his stance on fighting the winner of Wood and Conlan, Santa Cruz called for a fight against newly crowned WBC featherweight champion Mark Magsayo (24–0, 16 KOs), after he defeated Gary Russell Jr, another boxer who Santa Cruz had called for a fight over the years. Santa Cruz praised Magsayo on his win. His father Jose, wanted him to return to featherweight, as he did not believe he had the power to really hurt boxers north of the division.

==== Inactivity ====
On 6 April 2022, the WBA formally ordered Santa Cruz to defend his (super) featherweight title against Leigh Wood (26–2, 12 KOs) . Wood knocked Conlan out of the ring in the final round after being dropped in the opening round and behind on all the scorecards. Both teams were given the standard 30 day negotiation period. An appeal was made by Matchroom Boxing, Wood's promoter, for the purse split to be 50-50, rather than the traditional 75/25 split. A purse bid was scheduled for 12 August. A week before the purse bids, Hearn revealed his promotional company had plans for Wood to fight Mauricio Lara in September 2022. At the 11th hour, the purse bid was cancelled after an agreement was made with November 2022 a target date for the title consolidation. A week later it was revealed that the WBA would allow both Santa Cruz and Wood to have separate bouts later in the year. They approved for Santa Cruz to enter a unification fight against Rey Vargas, who uncrowned Mark Magsayo in July 2022.

Wood was due to fight Mexican boxer Mauricio Lara on 24 September 2022, but had to pull out due to a bicep injury. Plans for Santa Cruz's unification fight against Vargas also fell apart after Vargas decided to move up in weight. A doctor's note showed that Wood would not be able to train until 1 December, when the WBA would re-order the fight. In December 2022, Eddie Hearn announced that Wood had a fight date booked for 28 January in Nottingham, England. Hearn stated Wood will fight whether his opponent is Santa Cruz or anyone else. On 12 December, the WBA received notification from Santa Cruz that he officially vacated his featherweight title, which automatically elevated Wood to full and sole championship status.

== Personal life ==
Santa Cruz is the youngest of four brothers and also has two sisters. His three brothers, Antonio, José Armando and Roberto were also professional boxers. As of 2020, Santa Cruz had three children, with the oldest of the three, a daughter named Luna.

Premier Boxing Champions released a mini-series on YouTube, consisting of three episodes, titled 'Getting to Know Leo Santa Cruz'. This was to give fans an insight to his personal life ahead of his first fight against Abner Mares.

On 3 June 2025, his father and life-long trainer Jose Santa Cruz died after a long battle with cancer, at the age of 65. He lived a further five years after doctors told his family, they expected him to die after twice catching COVID in 2020. His heart stopped and his lungs were failing. Tributes poured in from boxing media.

== Professional boxing record ==
| 41 fights | 38 wins | 2 losses |
|---|---|---|
| By knockout | 19 | 1 |
| By decision | 19 | 1 |
| Draws | 1 | |

| No. | Result | Record | Opponent | Type | Round, time | Date | Location | Notes |
|---|---|---|---|---|---|---|---|---|
| 41 | Win | 38–2–1 | Keenan Carbajal | UD | 10 | 5 Feb 2022 | Michelob Ultra Arena, Paradise, Nevada, U.S. | |
| 40 | Loss | 37–2–1 | Gervonta Davis | KO | 6 (12), 2:40 | 31 Oct 2020 | Alamodome, San Antonio, Texas, U.S. | Lost WBA (Super) super featherweight title; For WBA (Regular) lightweight title |
| 39 | Win | 37–1–1 | Miguel Flores | UD | 12 | 23 Nov 2019 | MGM Grand Garden Arena, Paradise, Nevada, U.S. | Won vacant WBA (Super) super featherweight title |
| 38 | Win | 36–1–1 | Rafael Rivera | UD | 12 | 16 Feb 2019 | Microsoft Theater, Los Angeles, California, U.S. | Retained WBA (Super) featherweight title |
| 37 | Win | 35–1–1 | Abner Mares | UD | 12 | 9 Jun 2018 | Staples Center, Los Angeles, California, U.S. | Retained WBA (Super) featherweight title |
| 36 | Win | 34–1–1 | Chris Avalos | KO | 8 (12), 1:34 | 14 Oct 2017 | StubHub Center, Carson, California, U.S. | Retained WBA (Super) featherweight title |
| 35 | Win | 33–1–1 | Carl Frampton | MD | 12 | 28 Jan 2017 | MGM Grand Garden Arena, Paradise, Nevada, U.S. | Won WBA (Super) featherweight title |
| 34 | Loss | 32–1–1 | Carl Frampton | MD | 12 | 30 Jul 2016 | Barclays Center, New York City, New York, U.S. | Lost WBA (Super) featherweight title |
| 33 | Win | 32–0–1 | Kiko Martínez | TKO | 5 (12), 2:09 | 27 Feb 2016 | Honda Center, Anaheim, California, U.S. | Retained WBA (Super) featherweight title |
| 32 | Win | 31–0–1 | Abner Mares | MD | 12 | 29 Aug 2015 | Staples Center, Los Angeles, California, U.S. | Won vacant WBA (Super) featherweight title |
| 31 | Win | 30–0–1 | Jose Cayetano | UD | 10 | 2 May 2015 | MGM Grand Garden Arena, Paradise, Nevada, U.S. | |
| 30 | Win | 29–0–1 | Jesus Ruiz | TKO | 8 (12), 0:29 | 17 Jan 2015 | MGM Grand Garden Arena, Paradise, Nevada, U.S. | Retained WBC super bantamweight title |
| 29 | Win | 28–0–1 | Manuel Roman | KO | 2 (12), 0:55 | 13 Sep 2014 | MGM Grand Garden Arena, Paradise, Nevada, U.S. | Retained WBC super bantamweight title |
| 28 | Win | 27–0–1 | Cristian Mijares | UD | 12 | 8 Mar 2014 | MGM Grand Garden Arena, Paradise, Nevada, U.S. | Retained WBC super bantamweight title |
| 27 | Win | 26–0–1 | César Seda | UD | 12 | 14 Dec 2013 | Alamodome, San Antonio, Texas, U.S. | Retained WBC super bantamweight title |
| 26 | Win | 25–0–1 | Victor Terrazas | TKO | 3 (12), 2:09 | 24 Aug 2013 | StubHub Center, Carson, California, U.S. | Won WBC super bantamweight title |
| 25 | Win | 24–0–1 | Alexander Muñoz | TKO | 5 (10), 1:56 | 4 May 2013 | MGM Grand Garden Arena, Paradise, Nevada, U.S. | Won vacant USBA super bantamweight title |
| 24 | Win | 23–0–1 | Alberto Guevara | UD | 12 | 15 Dec 2012 | Memorial Sports Arena, Los Angeles, California, U.S. | Retained IBF bantamweight title |
| 23 | Win | 22–0–1 | Victor Zaleta | TKO | 9 (12), 1:42 | 10 Nov 2012 | Staples Center, Los Angeles, California, U.S. | Retained IBF bantamweight title |
| 22 | Win | 21–0–1 | Eric Morel | RTD | 5 (12), 3:00 | 15 Sep 2012 | MGM Grand Garden Arena, Paradise, Nevada, U.S. | Retained IBF bantamweight title |
| 21 | Win | 20–0–1 | Vusi Malinga | UD | 12 | 2 Jun 2012 | Home Depot Center, Carson, California, U.S. | Won vacant IBF bantamweight title |
| 20 | Win | 19–0–1 | Alejandro Hernández | RTD | 4 (10), 0:10 | 21 Jan 2012 | Bodega Del Boxeo, Ensenada, Mexico | |
| 19 | Win | 18–0–1 | Jorge Romero | TKO | 3 (8), 1:10 | 26 Nov 2011 | Plaza de Toros, Mexico City, Mexico | |
| 18 | Win | 17–0–1 | Everth Briceno | TKO | 11 (12), 1:58 | 30 Jul 2011 | International Center, Mazatlán, Mexico | Retained WBC Youth interim bantamweight title |
| 17 | Win | 16–0–1 | Jose Lopez | KO | 5 (8), 2:35 | 3 Jun 2011 | Fantasy Springs Resort Casino, Indio, California, U.S. | |
| 16 | Win | 15–0–1 | Stephane Jamoye | KO | 6 (10) | 26 Mar 2011 | Instituto de la Juventud, Xalapa, Mexico | Won vacant WBC Youth interim bantamweight title |
| 15 | Win | 14–0–1 | James Owens | TKO | 1 (6), 1:14 | 21 Oct 2010 | Martin's Valley Mansion, Cockeysville, Maryland, U.S. | |
| 14 | Win | 13–0–1 | Jose Angel Cota | TKO | 3 (8), 1:35 | 3 Jun 2010 | Casino, Commerce, California, U.S. | |
| 13 | Win | 12–0–1 | Juan Jose Beltran | TKO | 3 (8), 2:17 | 17 Dec 2009 | Casino, Commerce, California, U.S. | |
| 12 | Win | 11–0–1 | Julio Valadez | KO | 1 (6), 1:22 | 3 Nov 2009 | Casino, Commerce, California, U.S. | |
| 11 | Win | 10–0–1 | Robert DaLuz | UD | 6 | 22 Aug 2009 | Casino Resort and Spa, Pala, California, U.S. | |
| 10 | Win | 9–0–1 | Jonathan Velardez | UD | 6 | 10 Jul 2009 | Events Center, Reno, Nevada, U.S. | |
| 9 | Win | 8–0–1 | Jose Garcia Bernal | UD | 6 | 7 Mar 2009 | Valencia Ballroom, York, Pennsylvania, U.S. | |
| 8 | Win | 7–0–1 | Adrian Aleman | UD | 4 | 19 Sep 2008 | Star of the Desert Arena, Primm, Nevada, U.S. | |
| 7 | Win | 6–0–1 | Gino Escamilla | UD | 6 | 25 Jul 2008 | The Joint, Paradise, Nevada, U.S. | |
| 6 | Win | 5–0–1 | Daniel Quevedo | UD | 4 | 28 Mar 2008 | Industry Hills Expo Center, City of Industry, California, U.S. | |
| 5 | Win | 4–0–1 | Jose Pacheco | KO | 2 (4), 1:06 | 4 Jan 2008 | Alameda Swap Meet, Los Angeles, California, U.S. | |
| 4 | Win | 3–0–1 | Elton Dharry | UD | 4 | 23 Nov 2007 | Morongo Casino Resort & Spa, Cabazon, California, U.S. | |
| 3 | Win | 2–0–1 | Joseph Rios | UD | 4 | 5 Oct 2007 | Cliff Castle Casino Hotel, Camp Verde, Arizona, U.S. | |
| 2 | Draw | 1–0–1 | Rodrigo Hernandez | MD | 4 | 5 Jan 2007 | Dickerson's Event Center, Las Cruces, New Mexico, U.S. | |
| 1 | Win | 1–0 | Pedro Silva | KO | 2 (4), 1:56 | 13 Oct 2006 | Palo Duro Creek Golf Course, Nogales, Arizona, U.S. | |

== Titles in boxing ==
=== Major world titles ===
- IBF bantamweight world champion (118 lbs)
- WBC super bantamweight champion (122 lbs)
- WBA (Super) featherweight champion (126 lbs) (2×)
- WBA (Super) super featherweight champion (130 lbs)

=== Interim minor world titles ===
- WBC Youth interim bantamweight champion (Note: The Youth title is one of the World Boxing Council's minor world championships for young up-and-coming professional boxers.) (118 lbs)

=== Regional/International titles ===
- USBA super bantamweight champion (122 lbs)

=== Honorary titles ===
- WBC Diamond featherweight champion

== See also ==
- List of Mexican boxing world champions
- List of boxing quadruple champions

== Notes and references ==
=== Video references ===
Sporting positions
Regional boxing titles
| Vacant Title last held by Fahpetchnoi Sor Chitpattana | WBC Youth bantamweight champion Interim title March 26, 2011 – November 2011; Vacated | Vacant Title next held by Tassana Sanpattan |
| Vacant Title last held by Teon Kennedy | USBA super bantamweight champion May 4, 2013 – August 24, 2013; Vacated | Vacant Title next held by Tramaine Williams |
World boxing titles
| Vacant Title last held by Abner Mares | IBF bantamweight champion June 2, 2012 – February 12, 2013; Vacated | Vacant Title next held by Jamie McDonnell |
| Preceded by Victor Terrazas | WBC super bantamweight champion August 24, 2013 – November 1, 2015; Vacated | Succeeded by Julio Ceja promoted from interim status |
| Vacant Title last held by Nicholas Walters | WBA featherweight champion Super title August 29, 2015 – July 30, 2016 | Succeeded by Carl Frampton |
| Preceded by Carl Frampton | WBA featherweight champion Super title January 28, 2017 – December 12, 2022 | Vacant Title next held by Leigh Wood as Champion |
| Vacant Title last held by Gervonta Davis | WBA super featherweight champion Super title November 24, 2019 – October 31, 2020 | Succeeded by Gervonta Davis |
