= César Seda =

Puerto Rican professional boxer (born 1986)

Cesar Seda
Personal information
- Nationality: Puerto Rico
- Born: January 17, 1986 (age 40)
- Height: 5 ft 5 in (165 cm)

Boxing career

Boxing record
- Total fights: 31
- Wins: 28
- Win by KO: 18
- Losses: 3
- Draws: 0

César Seda Pacheco Jr. (born January 17, 1986) is a Puerto Rican former professional boxer. He currently has 28 wins and 3 losses, with 17 of those wins coming by knockout. Seda competed in the Super bantamweight division. Seda was the former IBO Flyweight world champion, holding the title from 2009 to 2010. On December 14, 2013, Seda fought Leo Santa Cruz for the WBC Super bantamweight championship of the world. The title fight went the distance, with Santa Cruz defeating Seda by unanimous decision.
