= Christopher Martin (boxer) =

American boxer

Christopher Martin Piña
Personal information
- Nickname: S.D. Kid
- Born: Christopher Joshua Martin Piña; July 5, 1986 (age 40) San Diego, California, U.S.
- Height: 5 ft 7 in (170 cm)
- Weight: Super bantamweight Featherweight; Super featherweight

Boxing career
- Reach: 70 in (178 cm)
- Stance: Orthodox

Boxing record
- Total fights: 46
- Wins: 31
- Win by KO: 11
- Losses: 12
- Draws: 3
- No contests: 0

Christopher Joshua Martin Piña (born July 5, 1986) is an American professional boxer in the Super Bantamweight division and is the current WBO NABO Super Bantamweight Champion.

== Professional career ==
In August 2010, Martin upset an undefeated Christopher Avalos at the Grand Casino in Hinckley, Minnesota. The bout was televised on a Showtime undercard.

In May 2011, Christopher again won an upset, this time over contender Charles Huerta to win the vacant WBO NABO Super Bantamweight Championship. This bout was the main-event of a TeleFutura boxing card.
