= Chris Avalos =

American boxer (born 1989)

Personal information
- Nickname: Hitman
- Born: November 5, 1989 (age 36) San Diego, California, U.S.
- Height: 5 ft 7 in (170 cm)
- Weight: Bantamweight; Super bantamweight; Featherweight

Boxing career
- Reach: 68 in (173 cm)
- Stance: Orthodox

Boxing record
- Total fights: 35
- Wins: 27
- Win by KO: 20
- Losses: 8

Christopher Matthew Avalos (born November 5, 1989) is an American professional boxer.

== Professional career ==
On April 24, 2010 Avalos stopped the veteran John Alberto Molina to win the WBO-NABO bantamweight title.

In August 2010, Avalos lost to an undefeated Christopher Martin Peña at the Grand Casino in Hinckley, Minnesota. The bout was televised on a Showtime undercard.

In February 2015 he was defeated by IBF super bantamweight champion, Carl Frampton in Belfast, losing via fifth-round technical knockout.

In his next big fight he was defeated by WBA (Super) featherweight champion, Léo Santa Cruz, losing one his second world title attempt via eighth-round knockout.
