= Manuel Roman =

Mexican boxer (born 1988)

Personal information
- Born: January 10, 1988 (age 38) Tijuana, Baja California, Mexico
- Height: 5 ft 7 in (170 cm)

Boxing career

Boxing record
- Total fights: 28
- Wins: 20
- Win by KO: 7
- Losses: 4
- Draws: 3
- No contests: 1

Manuel Roman (born January 10, 1988) is a Mexican professional boxer from Paramount, California, United States. As of the 11th of August, 2024, he had 20 wins, 4 losses, and 3 draws. Roman currently fights in the super bantamweight division. On September 13, 2014, Roman lost to Leo Santa Cruz in the WBC super bantamweight championship of the world by TKO in the second round. He faced Diego De La Hoya on February 27, 2015.
