= Francisco Arce (boxer) =

Mexican boxer (born 1981)

Personal information
- Nickname: Panchito
- Nationality: (Mexico) Mexican
- Born: Francisco Arce Armenta; August 29, 1981 (age 45) Los Mochis, Sinaloa, Mexico
- Height: 5 ft 9 in (177 cm)
- Weight: Featherweight; Super bantamweight Bantamweight; Super flyweight

Boxing career
- Reach: 71 in (182 cm)
- Stance: Orthodox

Boxing record
- Total fights: 42
- Wins: 31
- Win by KO: 22
- Losses: 8
- Draws: 3
- No contests: 0

Francisco Arce Armenta (born August 29, 1981) is a Mexican professional boxer. He is a former IBF Latino Super Flyweight champion and was NABF Super Bantamweight champion. Francisco is also the younger brother of former five-division world champion Jorge Arce.

== Professional career ==
Early in his career he lost to future world champion Giovanni Segura in Maywood, California.

In November 2008, Francisco won the IBF Latino super flyweight champion by beating William De Sousa of Panama.

On October 9, 2010, Arce beat former WBO champion Isidro García to win the NABF super bantamweight championship.

== Retirement ==
He retired in 2012. He is a father of three girls (Emily, America, Nalani) and has been married 22 years to America Armenta.

== Professional boxing record ==
| 42 fights | 31 wins | 8 losses |
|---|---|---|
| By knockout | 22 | 2 |
| By decision | 9 | 6 |
| Draws | 3 | |

| No. | Result | Record | Opponent | Type | Round, time | Date | Location | Notes |
|---|---|---|---|---|---|---|---|---|
| 18 | Win | 16–1–1 | Jose German Cruz | MD | 8 | Oct 23, 2004 | Activity Center,Maywood,U.S. | |
| 17 | Win | 15–1–1 | Carlos Alberto Banuelos | KO | 2 (6) | Sep 4, 2004 | Plaza de Toros, Tijuana,Mexico | |
| 16 | Win | 14–1–1 | Salvador Casillas | MD | 8 | Jul 10, 2004 | Activity Center,Maywood,U.S. | |
| 15 | Win | 13–1–1 | Miguel Martinez | UD | 8 | Apr 17, 2004 | Activity Center,Maywood,U.S. | |
| 14 | Win | 12–1–1 | Roberto Gomez | UD | 6 | Apr 3, 2004 | Grand Arena, City of Industry,U.S. | |
| 13 | Win | 11–1–1 | Jose Antonio Rico | UD | 6 | Mar 12, 2004 | HP Pavilion, San Jose,U.S. | |
| 12 | Win | 10–1–1 | Juan Carlos Perez | UD | 6 | Nov 7, 2003 | Desert Diamond Casino, Tucson,U.S. | |
| 11 | Win | 9–1–1 | Sandro Orlando Oviedo | TKO | 5 (6) | Jun 2, 2003 | Coeur d'Alene Casino, Worley,U.S. | |
| 10 | Loss | 8–1–1 | Samuel Lopez | UD | 6 | Jan 16, 2003 | Olympic Auditorium, Los Angeles,U.S. | |
| 9 | Win | 8–0–1 | Luis Alfonso De La Rosa | UD | 6 | Aug 23, 2002 | Quiet Cannon, Montebello,U.S. | |
| 8 | Win | 7–0–1 | Noe Flores | TKO | 2 (8) | Dec 7, 2001 | Mulege, Mexico | |
| 7 | Win | 6–0–1 | Felipe Acosta | PTS | 4 | Dec 7, 2001 | Frontón Palacio Jai Alai, Tijuana, Mexico | |
| 6 | Win | 5–0–1 | unknown | KO | 3 (6) | Oct 19, 2001 | Guerrero Negro, Mexico | |
| 5 | Draw | 4–0–1 | Felipe Acosta | PTS | 6 | Mar 23, 2001 | Auditorio Benito Juarez, Los Mochis, Mexico | |
| 4 | Win | 4–0 | Trinidad Ruiz | KO | 2 (4) | Mar 23, 2001 | Tijuana, Mexico | |
| 3 | Win | 3–0 | Branni Guerrero | KO | 4 (4) | Dec 15, 2000 | Tlalnepantla, Mexico | |
| 2 | Win | 2–0 | Octavio Marquez | KO | 1 (4) | Dec 9, 2000 | Auditorio Municipal, Tijuana, Mexico | |
| 1 | Win | 1–0 | Trinidad Valenzuela | TKO | 2 (4) | Sep 29, 2000 | Rosarito, Mexico | |

== See also ==
- Notable boxing families
