= Deontay Wilder vs. Luis Ortiz II =

2019 boxing match

- Date: November 23, 2019
- Venue: MGM Grand Garden Arena; Las Vegas, Nevada, United States
- Title(s) on the line: WBC Heavyweight Championship

Tale of the tape
Boxer	Deontay Wilder	Luis Ortiz
Nickname	The Bronze Bomber	King Kong
Hometown	Tuscaloosa, Alabama, U.S	Camaguey, Cuba
Pre-fight record	41–0–1 (40 KO)	31–1 (2) (26 KO)
Age	34 years, 1 month	39 years, 7 months
Height	6 ft 7 in (201 cm)	6 ft 4 in (193 cm)
Weight	219 1/2 lb (100 kg)	236 1/2 lb (107 kg)
Style	Orthodox	Southpaw
Recognition	WBC; Heavyweight Champion; The Ring/TBRB; No. 3 Ranked Heavyweight	WBC; No. 3 Ranked Heavyweight; The Ring/TBRB; No. 6 Ranked Heavyweight

Result
- Wilder wins via 7th-round knockout

Deontay Wilder vs. Luis Ortiz II was a professional boxing match contested on November 23, 2019, for the WBC heavyweight championship.

== Background ==
After his first round knockout of Dominic Breazeale in May 2019, Deontay Wilder was linked with both a rematch with Lineal champion Tyson Fury and an undisputed bout with Anthony Joshua. However he opted for a rematch with Luis Ortiz who he had stopped in March 2018. This was criticised by Dillian Whyte who had been the top ranked contender with the WBC for more than 600 days, without getting a title shot.

It was expected that Ortiz would push Wilder with the BBC Sport boxing correspondent Mike Costello saying "I see not necessarily a similar fight to last time but I do see Ortiz again giving Wilder plenty to think about"

Wilder was 7-1 favorite going into the bout.

== The fight ==
Ortiz clearly outboxed Wilder for the first six rounds. However in the 7th round Wilder landed a straight right that knocked Ortiz down and he failed to beat the count.

At the time of the stoppage Ortiz led on all three scorecards with two scores of 55–59 and one of 56–58. Both the AP and The Guardian had it a shutout of 54–60 to Ortiz.

== Aftermath ==
“Next we have Tyson Fury in the rematch,” Wilder said in the ring after the bout “Then I want unification. I want one champion, one face and one heavyweight champion – Deontay Wilder.”

A month after the bout the rematch with Tyson Fury was confirmed.

== Fight card ==
Weight Class		vs.		Method	Round	Time	Notes
Main card
Heavyweight	(United States) Deontay Wilder (c)	def.	(Cuba) Luis Ortiz	KO	7(12)	2:51	^{Note 1}
Super featherweight	(Mexico) Léo Santa Cruz (c)	def.	(United States) Miguel Flores	UD	12		^{Note 2}
Super bantamweight	(United States) Brandon Figueroa (c)	draw	(Mexico) Julio Ceja	SD	12		^{Note 3}
Bantamweight	(Mexico) Luis Nery	canceled	(Puerto Rico) Emmanuel Rodríguez		-/12		^{Note 4}
Undercard
Super featherweight	(Mexico) Eduardo Ramírez	def.	(Cuba) Leduan Barthelemy	TKO	4(10)	2:59
Super featherweight	(Ukraine) Viktor Slavinskyi	def.	(United States) Rigoberto Hermosillo	UD	6
Lightweight	(Philippines) John Gemino	def.	(United States) Arnold Alejandro	KO	5(6)	1:45
Super lightweight	(United States) Omar Juarez	def.	(United States) Kevin Shacks	KO	6	1:59
Super featherweight	(United States) José Manuel Gomez	def.	(United States) Daniel Placeres	RTD	3(6)
Cruiserweight	(United States) Dustin Long	def.	(United States) Marsellos Wilder	KO	4(6)	1:51
Featherweight	(United States) Angel Alejandro	def.	(United States) Francisco Rodríguez	UD	6
Super bantamweight	(United States) Shon Mondragon	def.	(Nicaragua) Juan Centeno	UD	4
Welterweight	(United States) Vito Mielnicki Jr.	def.	(United States) Marklin Bailey	TKO	2(4)	2:31

^Note 1 For WBC heavyweight title
^Note 2 For vacant WBA (Super) super featherweight title
^Note 3 For WBA (Regular) super bantamweight title
^Note 4 For WBC Silver bantamweight title

== Broadcasting ==
The fight was televised on PPV's Fox in the United States.

Country	Broadcaster			
Country	Free-to-air	Cable/pay television	PPV	Stream
United States (host)	—N/a	Fox Sports		Fox Sports Go
United States (host)	—N/a	Fox Deportes		Fox Sports Go
International (unsold markets)	—N/a		FITE TV	
Australia	—N/a		Main Event	—N/a
Austria	—N/a			DAZN
Germany	—N/a			DAZN
Spain	—N/a			DAZN
Switzerland	—N/a			DAZN
Brazil	—N/a	Fox Sports	—N/a	Fox Play
Canada	—N/a		Sportsnet PPV	
France	—N/a	Canal+ Sport	—N/a	My Canal
Indonesia	Mola TV		—N/a	Mola TV On Demand
Timor-Leste	Mola TV		—N/a	Mola TV On Demand
Ireland	—N/a	Sky Sports	—N/a	Sky Go
United Kingdom	—N/a	Sky Sports	—N/a	Sky Go
Japan	—N/a	WOWOW	—N/a	WOWOW
Kazakhstan	Khabar	—N/a		Khabar
Latin America: Argentina; Bolivia; Chile; Colombia; Costa Rica; Dominican Republic; Ecuador; El Salvador; Guatemala; Honduras; Nicaragua; Panama; Paraguay; Peru; Uruguay; Venezuela	—N/a	ESPN	—N/a	WatchESPN
Mexico	Azteca 7	—N/a		Azteca En Vivo
Panama	RPC-TV	—N/a		Medcom Go
Poland	TVP Sport	—N/a		TVP Stream
Russia	Match TV			
Turkey	DMAX	—N/a		DMAX

== See also ==
- Deontay Wilder vs. Luis Ortiz

Preceded by vs. Dominic Breazeale	Deontay Wilder's bouts November 23, 2019	Succeeded by vs. Tyson Fury II
Preceded by vs. Christian Hammer	Luis Ortiz's bouts November 23, 2019	Succeeded by vs. Alexander Flores
Awards
Previous: Naoya Inoue vs. Juan Carlos Payano	The Ring Knockout of the Year; 2019	Next: Léo Santa Cruz vs. Gervonta Davis
