= Jesús Ruiz (boxer) =

Mexican boxer (born 1990)

Jesus Ruiz
Personal information
- Nickname: Estrella
- Born: January 2, 1990 (age 36) Nogales, Sonora, Mexico
- Height: 5 ft 7 in (170 cm)

Boxing career

Boxing record
- Total fights: 57
- Wins: 43
- Win by KO: 31
- Losses: 9
- Draws: 5

Jesus Ruiz (born January 2, 1990) is a Mexican professional Boxer from Nogales, Sonora, Mexico. He has currently 41 wins, 5 draws, and 9 losses. He currently fights in the super bantamweight division.
