= Oscar De La Hoya vs. Steve Forbes =

Boxing match

Homecoming
- Date: May 3, 2008
- Venue: Home Depot Center, Carson, California, U.S.

Tale of the tape
Boxer	Oscar De La Hoya	Steve Forbes
Nickname	The Golden Boy	2Pound
Hometown	East Los Angeles, California, U.S.	Portland, Oregon, U.S.
Pre-fight record	38–5 (30 KO)	33–5 (9 KO)
Age	35 years, 2 months	31 years, 2 months
Height	5 ft 11 in (180 cm)	5 ft 7 1/2 in (171 cm)
Weight	150 lb (68 kg)	150 lb (68 kg)
Style	Orthodox	Orthodox
Recognition	WBC/WBO; No. 1 Ranked Light Middleweight; The Ring; No. 3 Ranked Light Middleweight; 6-division world champion	Former IBF super featherweight champion

Result
- De La Hoya wins via unanimous decision (120–108, 119–109, 119–109)

Oscar De La Hoya vs. Steve Forbes, billed as Homecoming, was a professional boxing match contested on May 3, 2008.

== Background ==
Oscar De La Hoya, having lost his previous fight to Floyd Mayweather Jr. on May 5, 2007, announced his return in February 2008 to boxing in what would prove to be a year-long absence to face Steve Forbes on May 3, 2008, a former IBF super featherweight champion who had recently appeared on the ESPN reality show The Contender. The bout was looked upon as a mere tune-up for De La Hoya prior to facing Mayweather Jr. in a planned rematch later that year in September.

De La Hoya once gain employed Mayweather's estranged father Floyd Mayweather Sr., who had previously trained him from 2000 to 2006, as his trainer after opting to hire Freddie Roach for his fight against Floyd Jr. to avoid the perceived conflict of having his opponent's father train him and also refusing to pay the elder Mayweather's demanded $2 million salary, though De La Hoya announced his intentions to keep Mayweather Sr. as his trainer for not only the Forbes fight but for his planned rematch with Mayweather Jr. as well. Adding further drama, Forbes initially employed Roger Mayweather, Floyd Sr.'s younger brother and Mayweather Jr.'s uncle and current trainer to train him for the De La Hoya fight. However, when Floyd Jr. threatened to fire Roger should he continue working with Forbes, which in turn caused Forbes to fire Roger and replace him with Jeff Mayweather, the youngest brother of Floyd Sr. and Roger. Jeff himself had been beaten by De La Hoya in 1993.

== The Fight ==
De La Hoya served as the aggressor from the opening round on, as he would win in extremely lopsided fashion. De La Hoya threw 810 punches, landing 253 of them, which was over 100 more than Forbes, who landed only 152. De La Hoya constantly pressed the action, stalking Forbes and landing consistent combinations to Forbes body and head. Though De La Hoya bloodied Forbes' nose, he was unable to score a knockdown and the fight went the full 12-round distance, though De La Hoya would nearly complete a sweep of Forbes on all three scorecards, winning all 12 rounds on one (120–108) and all but one round on the other two (119–107).

== Aftermath ==
The victory would prove to be the final one of De La Hoya's professional career.

== Fight card ==
Confirmed bouts:

Weight Class	Weight		vs.		Method	Round	Notes
Catchweight	150 lbs.	Oscar De La Hoya	def.	Steve Forbes	UD	12/12
Welterweight	147 lbs.	Victor Ortiz	def.	Dairo Esalas	KO	5/10
Super Welterweight	154 lbs.	Sven Paris	def.	Freddy Curiel	SD	8/8
Lightweight	135 lbs.	Wes Ferguson	def.	Miguel Angel Munguia	UD	8/8
Welterweight	147 lbs.	Danny Garcia	def.	Julio Gamboa	UD	6/6
Super Lightweight	140 lbs.	Hector Sanchez	def.	Arthur Brambila	UD	4/4
Super Middleweight	168 lbs.	Daniel Jacobs	def.	Jose Pena	TKO	1/4

== Broadcasting ==
Country	Broadcaster
United States	HBO

Preceded by vs. Floyd Mayweather Jr.	Oscar De La Hoya's bouts 3 May 2008	Succeeded by vs. Manny Pacquiao
Preceded by vs. Francisco Bojado	Steve Forbes's bouts 3 May 2008	Succeeded by vs. Andre Berto
