= Oscar De La Hoya vs. Manny Pacquiao =

Boxing match

The Dream Match
- Date: December 6, 2008
- Venue: MGM Grand Garden Arena, Las Vegas, Nevada, U.S.

Tale of the tape
Boxer	Oscar De La Hoya	Manny Pacquiao
Nickname	The Golden Boy	Pac-Man
Hometown	East Los Angeles, California, U.S.	General Santos, Philippines
Purse	$20,000,000	$6,000,000
Pre-fight record	39–5 (30 KO)	47–3–2 (35 KO)
Age	35 years, 10 months	29 years, 11 months
Height	5 ft 10 1/2 in (179 cm)	5 ft 6 1/2 in (169 cm)
Weight	145 lb (66 kg)	142 lb (64 kg)
Style	Orthodox	Southpaw
Recognition	WBC/WBO; No. 1 Ranked Light Middleweight; The Ring; No. 3 Ranked Light Middleweight; 6-division world champion	WBC; Lightweight Champion; The Ring; No. 2 Ranked Lightweight; The Ring pound-for-pound No. 1 ranked fighter 5-division world champion

Result
- Pacquiao wins via 8th-round RTD

Oscar De La Hoya vs. Manny Pacquiao, also billed as The Dream Match, was a professional boxing match contested on December 6, 2008. Pacquiao defeated De La Hoya via technical knockout when De La Hoya decided not to continue with the fight before the start of the ninth round. The card was a co-production of Bob Arum's Top Rank Boxing and De La Hoya's Golden Boy Promotions and was aired live on pay-per-view (PPV) on HBO PPV. The fight is notable for propelling Manny Pacquiao to full-blown superstar status in much of the western world (mostly in The United States), as Oscar De La Hoya symbolically "passed the torch", so to speak, to Pacquiao. This would mark De La Hoya's final professional fight when he retired from boxing in 2009.

Despite no title belts being disputed, the bout received a lot of publicity since the two boxers were decorated, with Pacquiao being the current number one pound for pound boxer in the world as judged by The Ring, and a five-time world champion in five different weight divisions (Pacquiao was the reigning WBC lightweight champion at the time of the bout). Meanwhile, De La Hoya was an Olympic gold medalist and past holder of 10 world titles in six weight divisions.

Pacquiao had to step up two weight divisions (from lightweight), and De La Hoya had to go down one weight division (from light middleweight), to be eligible for the bout's welterweight division.

== Background ==
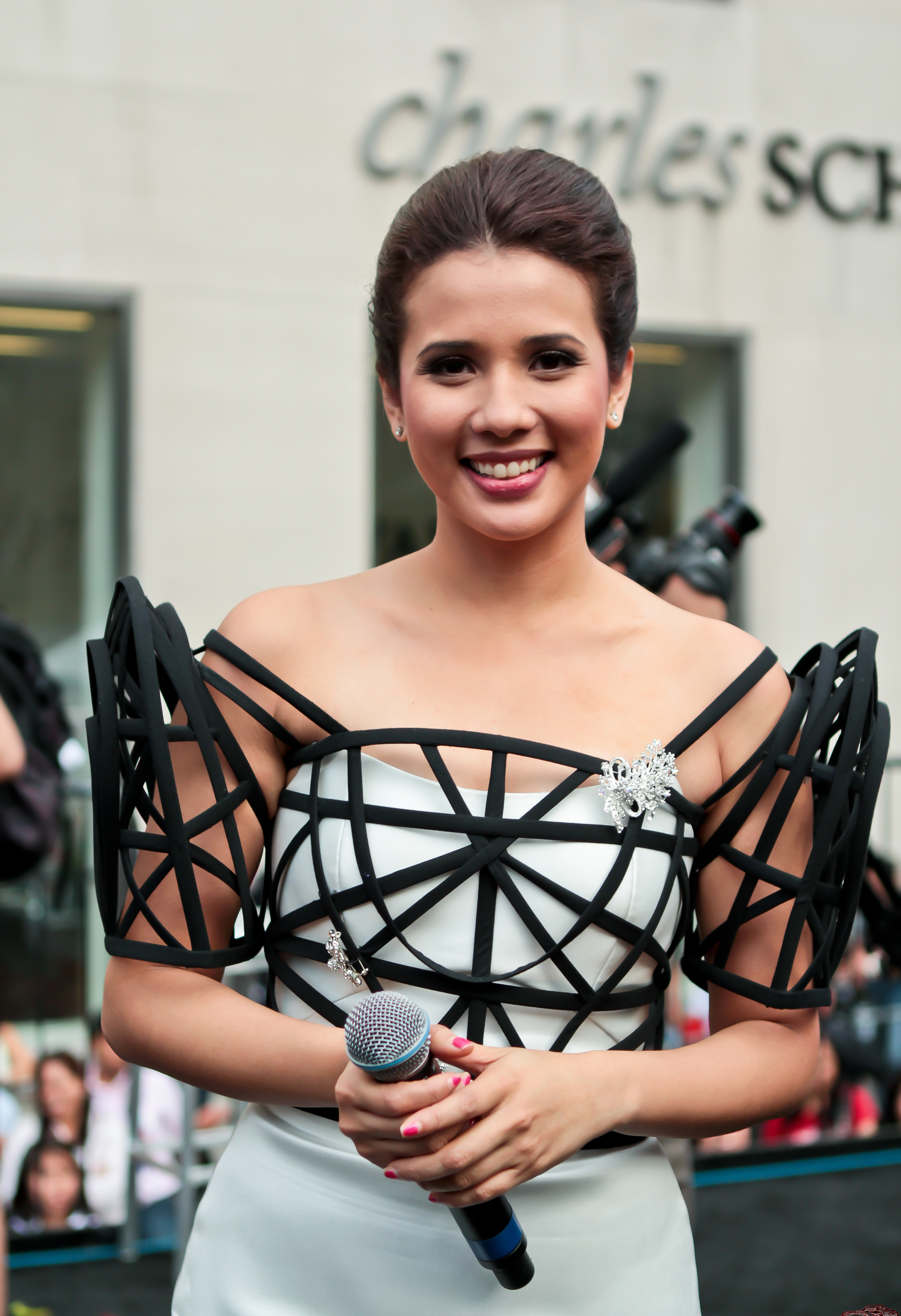
Karylle sang Lupang Hinirang, the Philippine national anthem.

The ideas of having De La Hoya and Pacquiao fight came from HBO boxing analyst Larry Merchant talking with ESPN boxing analyst Dan Rafael. Larry then presented the idea to Golden Boy Promotions CEO Richard Schaefer and Top Rank CEO Bob Arum. Bob presented the idea to Manny Pacquiao trainer Freddie Roach. It was even mentioned on the PPV broadcast that it was Larry's idea, even mentioning Dan Rafael by name. Freddie Roach since the De La Hoya- Mayweather fight has said in the media and in the De La Hoya/Pacquiao 24/7 series, press conferences, promos leading to the Dream Match that Oscar "can't pull the trigger anymore."

Pacquiao had made his US debut on the undercard of Oscar De La Hoya's bout with Javier Castillejo in June 2001.

=== Buildup ===
After De La Hoya's May 5 loss to Floyd Mayweather Jr. in 2007 (see Oscar De La Hoya vs. Floyd Mayweather Jr.), De La Hoya decided to close out his career with three fights in 2008. The first would be a tune-up bout in May before finishing with two mega bouts in September and December respectively. De La Hoya defeated Stevie Forbes in the May tune-up bout in preparation for Mayweather. Due to Mayweather's unexpected retirement however, Ricky Hatton was the new potential candidate to fight De La Hoya on September 20. However, Hatton rejected the offer because he felt the scheduled date was too close to his last bout. De La Hoya then decided to pass on a fight in September to set the stage for a showdown against either Manny Pacquiao or Miguel Cotto, should Cotto win his fight against Antonio Margarito in July. After Cotto was defeated by Margarito, it was announced that De La Hoya and Pound For Pound superstar Manny Pacquiao had agreed to fight December 6, 2008 at the MGM Grand in Las Vegas at the welterweight limit of 147 lbs. On August 28, 2008, a teleconference was held by Golden Boy Promotions to officially announce the fight.

=== Pre-fight publicity ===
Presented by Golden Boy Promotions and Top Rank, Inc., the bout was scheduled as a 12-round, non-title fight contested at the 147-pound welterweight limit. Although Pacquiao went into the fight recognized as the leading pound-for-pound boxer in the world, some boxing pundits speculated that 147 pounds could be too far above his natural weight against the larger De La Hoya. Pacquiao had fought above 130 pounds only once, winning the WBC's 135 pound title in his previous fight.

Many boxing analysts believed the fight would favor Oscar. Boxing analysts stated that Oscar's size, reach, experience, and good chin made Manny the underdog in this mega fight. Training for the fight Oscar hired trainers Angelo Dundee, Ignacio "Nacho" Beristáin, and young boxing talent Edwin Valero. Oscar told the news that his team is unbeatable, while Freddie Roach said, "No one is going to be able to help Oscar pull the trigger when he faces Manny Pacquiao on Dec. 6".

Tickets reportedly sold out just hours after they went on sale. The total gate revenues were said to be nearly $17 million. That amount apparently gave the bout the second-largest gate revenue in boxing history (after the De La Hoya-Mayweather Jr. fight on May 5, 2007, which generated $18.4 million in gate revenue).

== The fight ==
Manny Pacquiao soundly defeated Oscar De La Hoya, surprising many pre-fight analysts who had predicted a victory by De La Hoya. The fight ended at the beginning of the 9th round after Oscar and his corner threw in the towel. De La Hoya weighed in at a surprisingly light 145 pounds and Pacquiao weighed in at 142 pounds. On the night of the fight De La Hoya came into the ring weighing less than Pacquiao and close to 20 pounds under his usual fighting weight.

=== Rounds 1–4 ===
In round 1, De La Hoya's opening punches miss Pacquiao; Pacquiao's own straight left followed by a combination connects. The boxers exchange punches, with another Pacquiao straight left to end the round. At the start of the second round, a double jab by De La Hoya persuades Pacquiao to retreat. Only the second of De La Hoya's two combinations hits Pacquiao. A combo from Pacquiao leaves De La Hoya's face reddened. A flurry of punches from Pacquiao ends the round. The third round is more of the same as De La Hoya becomes increasingly unable to answer Pacquiao's combos.

=== Rounds 5–7 ===
Pacquiao unleashes a flurry of punches in round 5; De La Hoya saw it coming but wasn't able to react fast enough. De La Hoya himself lands a body shot and a couple of hooks, but the two boxers exchange punches at the end of the round. The next round begins as the last ended, with the men exchanging jabs. Pacquiao appears winded as he misses a left hook, but the follow-up lands on target. Pacquiao lands a right, and a four-punch combo to end the round.

In Round 7, Pacquiao lands a jab as De La Hoya misses his; Pacquiao unleashes another flurry of punches as De La Hoya's legs almost gave out, just as he ceased punching back. His uppercut misses Pacquiao as his opponent releases more jabs to end round 7.

=== Round 8 and aftermath ===
Pacquiao pursues De La Hoya's body but is warned by referee Tony Weeks to "keep them up" (keep punches above the belt). De La Hoya's right connects, but Pacquiao's combo pins De La Hoya in the corner. Another left by Pacquiao dazes the Mexican-American, as the Filipino follows up with another combination which wobbles De La Hoya. Pacquiao throws another combo as De La Hoya goes for the body. The Filipino unleashes a four-punch combo to end the round.

De La Hoya's team threw in the towel before the start of the ninth round and Pacquiao was awarded the victory.

Pacquiao was ahead on all three judges' scorecards before the stoppage, with two judges scoring the fight at 80-71 (Pacquiao won all rounds) and one scoring it at 79–72 (Pacquiao won 7 rounds and lost 1).

== Aftermath ==
After, the bout trainer Freddie Roach stated, "We knew we had him after the first round. He had no legs, he was hesitant and he was shot." Confirming Roach's pre-fight predictions that he'd grown too old, De La Hoya crossed the ring to Pacquiao's corner after the bout was stopped and told Roach, "You're right Freddie. I don't have it anymore." When asked by reporters whether he would continue fighting, De La Hoya responded, "My heart still wants to fight, that's for sure. But when your physical doesn't respond, what can you do? I have to be smart and make sure I think about my future plans."

=== Fight earnings ===
On December 10, 2008, HBO announced that the fight generated 1.25 million PPV buys totalling more than $70 million in PPV revenue. This fight was only the fourth non-heavyweight bout to have more than one million buys at that time, along with De La Hoya–Mayweather Jr. (2.4 million buys) in May 2007, De La Hoya–Hopkins (1 million buys) in 2004, and De La Hoya–Trinidad (1.4 million buys) in 1999.

The PPV card was the highest-grossing PPV event of the year in North America, ahead of UFC 91 (Randy Couture vs. Brock Lesnar) and WrestleMania XXIV.

== Undercard ==
Confirmed bouts:

- (Puerto Rico) Juan Manuel Lopez KOs (Argentina) Sergio Medina in the first round to retain the junior featherweight title.
- (United States) (Mexico) Victor Ortíz KOs (United States) Jeff Resto in the second round.
- (United States) Daniel Jacobs KOs (United States) Victor Lares in the second round.
- (United States) (Puerto Rico) Danny Garcia defeats (Mexico) Jose Alfredo Lugo via unanimous decision.
- (Mexico) Jose Angel Beranza defeats (Puerto Rico) Jesus Rojas via unanimous decision.
- (Philippines) Richie Mepranum defeats (United States) Cesar Ganigal Lopez via unanimous decision.
- (United States) (Mexico) Robert Marroquin KOs (United States) Isaac Hidalgo in the first round.
- (United States) Adrien Broner KOs (United States) Scott Furney in the first round.
- (Mexico) Sergio Caro KOs (Poland) Steven Sampson in the sixth round.

== Broadcasting ==
Country	Broadcaster
Hungary	Sport 1
Poland	Polsat
Philippines	Solar Sports (Pay, live)
Philippines	GMA Network and C/S 9 (Terrestrial, delayed)
United Kingdom	Sky Sports
United States	HBO

Preceded by vs. Steve Forbes	Oscar De La Hoya's bouts December 6, 2008	Retired
Preceded by vs. David Diaz	Manny Pacquiao's bouts December 6, 2008	Succeeded by vs. Ricky Hatton
