= Francisco Bojado =

Mexican boxer (born 1983)

Personal information
- Nickname: Panchito
- Born: 11 May 1983 (age 43) Guadalajara, Jalisco, Mexico
- Height: 1.74 m (5 ft 9 in)
- Weight: Welterweight; Light welterweight

Boxing career
- Reach: 178 cm (70 in)
- Stance: Orthodox

Boxing record
- Total fights: 21
- Wins: 18
- Win by KO: 12
- Losses: 3
- Draws: 0

Francisco Bojado (born 11 May 1983) is a Mexican former professional boxer who competed from 2001 to 2007. As an amateur, he competed at the 2000 Summer Olympics. Francisco is also the brother of amateur boxer, Angel Bojado.

== Amateur career ==
He compiled an amateur record of 168–15 and represented Mexico at the 2000 Olympic Games in Sydney, Australia.

Francisco lost in the second qualifying round at the games. He returned home with his eyes set on turning professional. Shortly after, he was signed by Shelly Finkel, a man who also managed Evander Holyfield and Mike Tyson, among many others. Finkel soon helped Bojado sign a multi-fight deal with cable television channel Showtime.

== Professional career ==
On January 13, 2001, he made his professional debut by beating Derrick Castor by knockout in the second round in Uncasville, Connecticut. He followed that victory with eight more knockout wins, including wins over veterans Mauro Lucero, Glenn Forde and Eleazar Contreras. But on February 16, 2002, also in Uncasville, he was upset by Juan Carlos Rubio, who beat him by a ten-round decision. He would later avenge the loss to Rubio, by 12-round decision.

On January 24, 2004, Francisco defeated experienced Emmanuel Clottey in Atlantic City, New Jersey.

On July 24, however, he suffered another setback, when former world Jr. Lightweight champion Jesse James Leija beat him by a split ten-round decision. He walked away from the sport following the loss.

In April 2007, Bojado signed a deal with promotional company Golden Boy Promotions, and made his return to the ring on May 4, 2007, against Dairo Esalas at the MGM Grand in Las Vegas. Bojado won a unanimous decision.

On October 6, 2007, Stephen Forbes won a split-decision upset over Bojado in a junior welterweight bout.

== Outside the ring ==
Bojado made an appearance on the HBO short series De La Hoya/Mayweather 24/7 as a sparring partner for Oscar De La Hoya.

Bojado was arrested in 2011 after allegedly failing to stop at US Border security, which resulted in shots being fired at him by police.

== Professional record ==
18 Wins (12 knockouts), 3 Losses, 0 Draw
Res.	Record	Opponent	Type	Rd., Time	Date	Location	Notes
Loss	18-	(United States) Steve Forbes	SD	10 (10)	Oct 6, 2007	Mandalay Bay Resort & Casino, Las Vegas, Nevada	
Win	18-2	(Mexico) Rogelio Castañeda, Jr.	TKO	10 (1:30)	Jul 27, 2007	Desert Diamond Casino, Tucson, Arizona	
Win	17-2	(Colombia) Dairo Esalas	UD	10 (10)	May 4, 2007	Boardwalk Hall, Atlantic City, New Jersey	
Loss	16-2	(United States) Jesse James Leija	UD	10 (10)	Jul 24, 2004	Mohegan Sun Casino, Uncasville, Connecticut	
Win	16-1	(United States) Andre Eason	UD	10 (10)	May 8, 2004	Casino Del Sol, Tucson, Arizona	
Win	15-1	(Ghana) Emmanuel Clottey	UD	10 (10)	Jan 24, 2004	Boardwalk Hall, Atlantic City, New Jersey	
Win	14-1	(Mexico) Juan Carlos Rubio	UD	12 (12)	Nov 22, 2003	Reliant Park, Houston, Texas	IBA Continental and WBC Continental Americas titles
Win	13-1	(United States) Lemuel Nelson	UD	10 (10)	Aug 9, 2003	Miami Arena, Miami, Florida	
Win	12-1	(Armenia) William Adamyan	TKO	6 (3:00)	May 10, 2003	Pechanga Center, Temecula, California	
Win	11-1	(Puerto Rico) Frankie Santos	TKO	10 (0:45)	Feb 1, 2003	Mohegan Sun Casino, Uncasville, Connecticut	
Win	10-1	(United States) Frankie Sanchez	UD	8 (8)	Oct 19, 2002	Reliant Park, Houston, Texas	
Loss	9-1	(Mexico) Juan Carlos Rubio	UD	10 (10)	Feb 16, 2002	Mohegan Sun Casino, Uncasville, Connecticut	
Win	9-0	(Mexico) Mauro Lucero	KO	1 (0:12)	Nov 3, 2001	MGM Grand, Las Vegas, Nevada	
Win	8-0	(United States) Eleazar Contreras	KO	2 (2:00)	Oct 13, 2001	Tropicana Hotel & Casino, Atlantic City, New Jersey	Won WBC Youth Light Welterweight title
Win	7-0	(United States) Manuel Varela	TKO	1 (2:17)	Sep 1, 2001	Don Haskins Convention Center, El Paso, Texas	
Win	6-0	(United States) Glenn Forde	KO	2 (0:08)	Jun 23, 2001	Mohegan Sun Casino, Uncasville, Connecticut	
Win	5-0	(Mexico) Ernesto Fuentes	TKO	1 (2:41)	May 19, 2001	Mohegan Sun Casino, Uncasville, Connecticut	
Win	4-0	(Mexico) David Montes	KO	3 (2:48)	May 5, 2001	Don Haskins Convention Center, El Paso, Texas	
Win	3-0	(United States) Mario Lacey	KO	1 (1:24)	Apr 20, 2001	Ballys Park Hotel Casino, Atlantic City, New Jersey	
Win	2-0	(Mexico) Alejandro Rivera	TKO	1 (2:08)	Mar 2, 2001	Texas Station Casino, North Las Vegas, Nevada	
Win	1-0	(United States) Detrick Castor	TKO	2 (1:38)	Jan 13, 2001	Mohegan Sun Casino, Uncasville, Connecticut	
