= Mayweather Promotions =

American boxing promotion firm

Company logo

Mayweather Promotions, LLC is an American boxing promotional firm founded in 2007 by Floyd Mayweather Jr., after exercising a provision in his contract with Bob Arum and Top Rank that allowed him to become a free agent for the price of $750,000. Al Haymon has been an advisor of Mayweather since then. Mayweather Promotions mainly co-promotes with Golden Boy Promotions.

== Current boxers ==
Name	Weight Class	Year signed	Notes
(Peru) Carlos Zambrano	Featherweight	2017	
(Uganda) Sharif Bogere	Lightweight	2016	
(Puerto Rico) Josue Vargas	Welterweight	2016	
(United States) Chris Pearson	Light Middleweight	2015	
(United States) Latondria Jones	Junior Middleweight	2015	
(Uzbekistan) Sanjarbek Rakhmanov	Junior Welterweight	2015	
(United States) Alexis Santiago	Super Bantamweight	2015	
(United States) Juan Heraldez	Junior Welterweight	2014	
(United States) Ladarius Miller	Welterweight	2014	
(United States) Kevin Newmann II	Super Middleweight	2014	
(United States) Lanell Bellows	Super Middleweight	2014	
(United States) J'Leon Love	Super Middleweight	2012	

== Former boxers ==
Name	Weight Class	Years signed	Notes
(United Kingdom) Viddal Riley	Cruiserweight	2019—2021	
(United States) Jessie Vargas	Welterweight	2008—2012	
(United States) Deandre Latimore	Light Middleweight	2011—2012	
(United States) Luís Arias	Middleweight	2012—2014	

== Trainers ==
- Floyd Mayweather Sr.
- Cornelius Boza-Edwards
- Jeff Mayweather
- Dewey Cooper

== Former trainers ==
- Roger Mayweather

== See also ==
- Golden Boy Promotions
