= Daniel Jacobs (boxer) =

American boxer (born 1987)

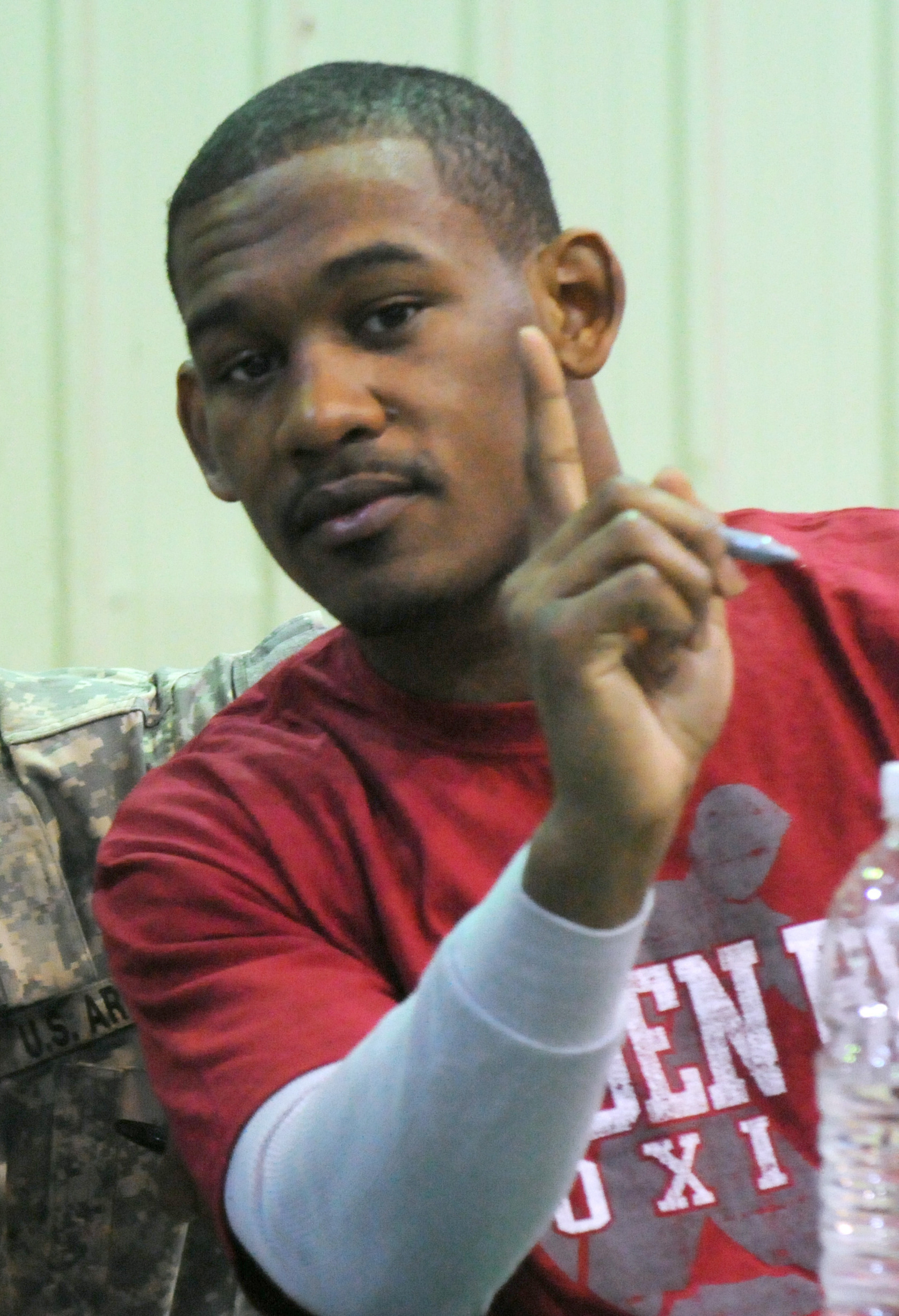
- Jacobs in 2011

Personal information
- Nicknames: The Golden Child; Miracle Man
- Born: February 3, 1987 (age 39) Brooklyn, New York City, New York, U.S.
- Height: 6 ft (183 cm)
- Weight: Middleweight; Super middleweight

Boxing career
- Reach: 73 1/2 in (187 cm)
- Stance: Orthodox

Boxing record
- Total fights: 42
- Wins: 37
- Win by KO: 30
- Losses: 5
Medal record
Men's amateur boxing
Golden Gloves
Gold medal – first place	2005 Little Rock	Middleweight
Gold medal – first place	2004 Kansas City	Welterweight
US National Championships
Gold medal – first place	2006 Colorado Springs	Middleweight

Daniel Jacobs (born February 3, 1987) is an American former professional boxer who competed from 2007 to 2024. He held the World Boxing Association (WBA) middleweight title (Regular version) from 2014 to 2017, and the International Boxing Federation (IBF) middleweight title from 2018 to 2019.

Nicknamed the "Miracle Man", Jacobs' career was almost cut short in 2011 due to osteosarcoma, a rare form of bone cancer. He went on to make a full recovery after spending 19 months out of the sports, meanwhile recovering from severe operation-induced injuries generally perceived as crippling.

== Early life ==
Jacobs was born and raised in Brownsville, Brooklyn. He was raised by his mother, Yvette Jacobs, his grandmother, Cordelia Jacobs, and his aunts. Jacobs graduated from Erasmus High School.

== Amateur career ==
As an amateur boxer, Jacobs recorded 137 wins and 7 losses. In 2003, Jacobs won the Junior Olympics national championship at 154 pounds. In 2004, Jacobs won the United States national champion in the 19-and-under division, a PAL national championship, and a National Golden Gloves welterweight championship. In 2005, he won his second PAL national championship and also won the National Golden Gloves middleweight championship. In July 2005 he faced Russian Matvey Korobov at the preliminaries of the 2005 Boxing World Cup, and lost via a third round stoppage. In 2006, Jacobs won the United States Amateur middleweight championship, decisioning Shawn Porter in the finals, 32–21. During his amateur career, Jacobs won four New York Golden Gloves championships. He almost qualified for the U.S. Olympic team for the 2008 Summer Olympics, beating Dominic Wade and Shawn Porter (twice) en route, but twice lost the North American Olympic Qualifier Super Middleweight finale to Shawn Estrada.

== Professional career ==
=== Early career ===
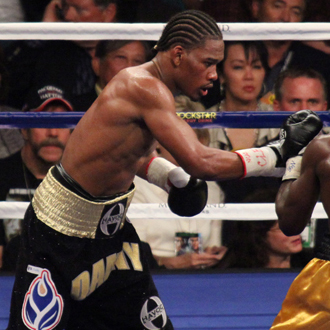
Jacobs vs. Michael Walker, 2009

Jacobs made his professional boxing debut on the undercard of Floyd Mayweather Jr. vs. Ricky Hatton, which took place on December 8, 2007, at the MGM Grand in Las Vegas, Nevada. In that fight, he defeated Jose Jesus Hurtado by first round technical knockout in just 29 seconds. Jacobs signed with Golden Boy Promotions and often fought on the undercard of super-fights. He was regarded as a blue-chip prospect.

On April 27, 2009, Jacobs agreed to replace junior middleweight James Kirkland, who was arrested on a gun charge, to fight Mike Walker, who was coming off a victory over two-time world title challenger Antwun Echols. The fight took place on May 2, 2009, at the MGM Grand in Las Vegas, and Jacobs won by unanimous decision with scores of 80–72 from two judges and 79–73 from the other. On August 22, 2009, Jacobs defeated Ishe Smith by unanimous decision to win the NABO middleweight title.

==== Jacobs vs. Pirog ====
On July 31, 2010, Jacobs faced undefeated Russian Dmitry Pirog for the vacant WBO middleweight championship. The belt had last belonged to Sergio Martínez, who was stripped due to not complying with the WBO's rules. The fight took place at the Mandalay Bay Events Center. Pirog was a 3–1 underdog going into the fight. Jacobs was up on the cards when he was caught with a massive right hand against the ropes and knocked out in the 5th round, handing him his first career loss. After the fight, Pirog said "After the second round, I knew I was good. I hurt him in the second and I knew I could come back and do it again."

Jacobs won his next two fights before he was diagnosed with osteosarcoma.

=== Return after cancer treatment ===
On October 20, 2012, having fully recovered from cancer, Jacobs made a successful return to professional boxing with a first-round knockout victory over Josh Luteran.

ESPN.com reported that the scheduled February 9, 2013 bout between Danny Garcia and Zab Judah at the Barclays Center in Brooklyn, New York was moved to April 27, 2013 because of a rib injury sustained by Garcia. With Jacobs penciled in on the undercard fight for this event, his fight moved to April 27 as well. Jacobs defeated Keenan Collins with a round 4 knockout on that date.

On August 19, 2013, Jacobs captured the WBC Continental Americas middleweight title via third-round knockout of Giovanni Lorenzo during the premiere of Golden Boy Live! on Fox Sports 1.

=== WBA (Regular) middleweight champion ===
On August 9, 2014, Jacobs challenged Jarrod Fletcher (18-1, 10 KOs) for the vacant WBA (Regular) middleweight title on the undercard of Danny Garcia vs. Rod Salka at the Barclays Center in New York. Jacobs won the fight, after a dominant performance, via TKO in the 5th-round. Jacobs started fast, dropping Fletcher in the first round following a left hook. Jacobs continued to dominate the round landing 40 power shots. Jacobs did not rush and fought the next few rounds patiently. He continued to target the body and had Fletcher in trouble again in the fourth round. Fletcher started the fifth round promising, but Jacobs landed a right hand which dropped Fletcher again. He beat the count, however Jacobs began to swarm him with shots until referee Michael Griffin stopped the fight at 2:18, after the ringside doctor got up on the apron, awarding Jacobs the win. The win was particularly emotional for Jacobs, who celebrated with family and friends in his hometown. After the fight, Jacobs said, "It feels so great to win this belt. It's the greatest moment in my life." Jacobs stated that he wanted to fight Peter Quillin next. According to CompuBox, Jacobs landed 117 of 294 punches (40%), while Fletcher landed just 37 of 229 punches (16%).

==== Jacobs vs. Truax ====
Jacobs' first defense came against Caleb Truax (25–1–2, 15 KOs) on April 24, 2015, at UIC Pavilion in Chicago. The fight was aired on Spike TV. Originally, it was scheduled to take place on April 11, on the undercard of Danny Garcia vs. Lamont Peterson, at Barclays Center in Brooklyn, however on March 7, the changes where made by PBC. Heading into the fight, Truax was aware of his underdog status, but believed he was the toughest challenge for Jacobs. He also noted that Jacobs was the toughest fighter he will face in his career to date. Jacobs weighed in at 159.4 pounds, while Truax came in at 159.6 pounds. On the night, Jacobs controlled the fight throughout and secured a 12th-round TKO victory, marking the first knockout loss of Truax's career. Jacobs out-boxed Truax from the opening bell, using his footwork, accuracy and defensive skills. Truax managed to land a few jabs and power shots, but they had minimal impact. After the midway point, Jacobs increased his offensive efforts and caused Truax's nose to bleed. In the championship rounds, Jacobs continued to pressure Truax, although Truax was able to land some counter punches. The end came in the twelfth round, when Jacobs landed a series of power shots, leading to a right hand which caused Truax to stumble against the ropes. Referee Dave Smith ruled it a knockdown, as the ropes supported Truax. The fight resumed with Jacobs launching a flurry of punches, leaving Truax unable to defend himself, leading the referee to stop the fight at 2:12 of the round. Jacobs became the first cancer survivor to win and defend a major belt and solidified his status as a top middleweight champion. According to Nielsen Media Research, the card reached 569,000 homes.

==== Jacobs vs. Mora ====
Jacobs' next defence was against former light middleweight titlist Sergio Mora (28-3-2, 9 KOs), only four months later on August 1, 2015. The fight was announced in June, as a co-feature bout on the Danny Garcia vs. Paulie Malignaggi card at the Barclays Center in Brooklyn on ESPN. Jacobs' admitted in looking ahead to challenge Peter Quillin, a more lucrative fight for him, but stated he was not looking past Mora. Both had something to prove going into the fight. With Jacobs, it was a chance to solidify his status as a rising champion and for Mora, to seize a final opportunity as a seasoned veteran. Although Jacobs was considered the favourite, he spoke positively about Mora's skill and understood the significance of gaining experience through this fight. Jacobs weighed 159.8 pounds, and Mora was slightly lighter at 159.2 pounds. The fight ended in the second round with a TKO victory for Jacobs after Mora sustained an ankle injury during a knockdown. Both started aggressively and traded knockdowns in the opening round. Mora was knocked down by a counter right hand, while Jacobs fell after receiving a short left hook. In the second round, Jacobs pressed the attack with a series of punches. With 27 seconds left in the round, Jacobs landed a right hand which caused Mora to crumple to the floor while trying to lean away from the shot. Referee Gary Rosato stopped the fight at 2:55 of the round, awarding the victory to Jacobs. Mora later stated he heard a "pop" and was unable to continue.

After the fight, Jacobs said, "I wanted to stop him. I didn't want him to quit on the stool. I wanted to beat him on my own. But I think he knew what the outcome was going to be a few rounds later." Mora mentioned the possibility of a rematch, to which Jacobs responded: "No rematch, no reason to go backward." CompuBox showed that Jacobs landed 23 of 71 punches (32%) and Mora landed 13 of 85 (15%). For the fight, Jacobs had a purse of $500,000, while Mora's purse was $225,000. Jacobs' trainer Andre Rozier believed that Mora was looking for a way out without facing a knockout loss, suggesting the injury was a convenient excuse. Jacobs later agreed with his trainers sentiments. Mora argued the fight should be classified as a no contest due to the nature of the injury being accidental and not resulting from a punch. He planned to appeal to the New York State Athletic Commission, citing that the injury was caused by an illegal punch and not a direct hit. Mora was also seeking medical advice for an avulsion fracture and related knee trauma, with an estimated recovery time of six to eight weeks.

==== Jacobs vs. Quillin ====
In August 2015, it was reported that a fight between Jacobs and Peter Quillin (31-0-1, 22 KOs) was in the works to take place at the Barclays Center in Brooklyn. December 5 was the date on hold for the bout which was likely to headline the event. The fight was expected to be Jacobs' toughest challenge since his loss to Dmitry Pirog in 2010. Quillin had to get past Australia’s Michael Zarafa (17-1, 9 KOs) in a scheduled 10-round bout on September 12 in Mashantucket, Connecticut. Ron Rizzo of DiBella Entertainment said, “It's a fight that's a long time coming. If Peter gets through his fight in September, then we move to a fight that both guys truly deserve.” On September 30, the fight was officially announced. On the announcement, Jacobs stated, “There is no doubt this is going to be one of the biggest fights Brooklyn has ever seen, Peter and I go back a long time, but this is business. I'm the champion and he's the challenger. I'm going to do everything I can to win on December 5 and show the world that I'm the best Brooklyn has to offer.” The card was broadcast live on Showtime and picked up in the United Kingdom by BoxNation. The fight was highlighted as career defining for both boxers. Lou DiBella said of the fight, “This is the biggest fight in Barclays history and certainly the biggest fight I will have promoted in Brooklyn and it's going to have the biggest crowd.”

On December 3, it was reported that Jacobs almost pulled out of the fight. A big aspect of the fight was Jacobs' insistence on implementing USADA drug testing protocols, which he requested to ensure a fair competition. He noted that the New York Commission was hesitant to allow their participation. Quillin's previous struggles with the middleweight limit was also a subject pre-fight, however Jacobs was preparing for the best version, indicating that he trained with the expectation of facing Quillin at his peak. Jacobs weighed 159.5 pounds and Quilln was 159 pounds, a full pound below the limit.

Jacobs beat Quillin by TKO in the first round, lasting only 85 seconds. Jacobs landed a powerful overhand right that caught Quillin flush on the temple and heavily rocked him. Jacobs then attempted to finish the fight landing a barrage of hard combinations. He landed another big punch that saw Quillin stagger over to the ropes, at which point referee Harvey Dock saw that Quillin was highly disorientated and waved the fight off with no complaint from Quillin. Many of the 8,442 fans in attendance were disappointed the fight lasted as long as it did. Jacobs landed 27 of 53 punches (51%) and Quillin landed on 2 of 16 (12%). After the fight, Jacobs told reporters, "I told him I love him. He's a brother of mine. Me and Peter Quillin go back to the Golden Gloves days. I have nothing but respect for him, his family -- but I knew it would be my night." Both boxers were paid a $1.5 million purse for the fight. Speaking at the post-fight press conference, Quillin was at peace with the decision and had no complaints. He acknowledged the desire to continue fighting but respected the referee's role in ensuring the safety of the boxers. Jacobs later stated that if the fans wanted, he would be open to a rematch.

Many, including Floyd Mayweather, felt that the fight was halted too early.

==== Jacobs vs. Mora II ====
In May 2016, it was reported that Jacobs and his team were looking at a potential rematch against Sergio Mora (28-4-2, 9 KOs) in the Summer. This was after WBA President Gilberto Mendoza Jr. reached out to both Jacobs team and Gennady Golovkin's team, as the two were on course to eventually fight each other. Jacobs was motivated to fight Mora because of comments made on social media, where he referred to him as "the most boring middleweight in the world," even though he believed a rematch was unnecessary. He also stated that Mora was getting a rematch, only because Billy Joe Saunders refused a unification fight. On July 29, terms were agreed for Jacobs' fourth defence, to take place on September 9, 2016. The fight was originally scheduled to take place on the Santa Cruz vs. Frampton undercard, on July 30. On August 4, the fight was officially announced to headline a card on Spike, on September 9 at the Santander Arena in Reading, Pennsylvania. Jacobs defeated Mora by TKO in the seventh round, marking his 12th consecutive stoppage win and a dominant performance. Jacobs started slow but began to take control by targeting Mora to the body. He switched to southpaw and landed a power shot to the body in the second round, which visibly staggered Mora. Jacobs dropped Mora in the fourth and fifth rounds, and Mora was being worn down gradually. In the seventh, Jacobs dropped Mora a further three times. The first was from a left-right combination, the second was from a left hook to the body and the third from a right hand. At 2:08 of the round, referee Gary Rosato stopped the fight. During the post-fight, both boxers showed mutual respect, putting aside pre-fight trash talk. Jacobs announced plans to return to the Barclays Center in December for another headline fight, before a big fight with Golovkin.

==== Jacobs vs. Golovkin ====
Jacobs was engaged in negotiations with WBC, IBF, IBO and WBA (Super) middleweight champion Gennady Golovkin through 2016. Jacobs was Golovkin's mandatory as both fighters held WBA belts, as part of the WBA's stated plan to unify their belts. WBA president Gilberto Mendoza confirmed in an email to RingTV that a deal had to be made by 5pm on December 7 or a purse bid would be held on December 19 in Panama. Later that day, the WBA announced a purse bid would be scheduled with a minimum bid of $400,000, with Golovkin receiving 75% and Jacobs 25%. Although purse bids were announced, Loeffler stated he would carry on negotiations, hopeful that a deal would be reached before the purse bid. On December 17, terms were finally agreed and it was officially announced that the fight would take place at Madison Square Garden in New York City on March 18, 2017. The fight would be shown on HBO PPV.

At the official weigh-in, a day before the fight, Golovkin tipped the scales at 159.6 lb, while Jacobs weighed 159.8 lb. Jacobs declined to compete for the IBF title by skipping a fight-day weight check. Unlike other major sanctioning bodies, the IBF requires participants in title fights to submit to a weight check on the morning of the fight, as well as the official weigh-in the day before the fight; at the morning weight check, they can weigh no more than 10 pounds (4.5 kg) above the fight's weight limit. Jacobs weighed 182 lb on fight night, 12 more than Golovkin.

In front of a sell-out crowd of 19,939, the fight went the full 12 rounds. This was the first time that Golovkin fought 12 rounds in his professional career. Golovkin's ring control, constant forward pressure and effective jab lead to a 115–112, 115–112, and 114–113 unanimous decision victory, ending his 23-fight knockout streak which dated back to November 2008. In the fourth round, Golovkin dropped Jacobs with a short right hand along the ropes for a flash knockdown. Jacobs recovered, but Golovkin controlled most of the middle rounds. Jacobs was effective in switching between orthodox and southpaw stance, but remained on the back foot. Both boxers were warned once in the fight by referee Charlie Fitch for rabbit punching. According to Compubox punch stats, Golovkin landed 231 of 615 punches (38%) which was more than Jacobs who landed 175 of 541 (32%). Jacobs thought he had won the fight by two rounds and attributed the loss due to the potential big money fight that is Golovkin vs. Canelo Álvarez. Jacobs also stated after being knocked down, he told Golovkin, "he'd have to kill me." In the post-fight interview, Golovkin said, "I'm a boxer, not a killer. I respect the game." Before revenue shares, it was reported that Golovkin would earn at least $2.5 million compared to Jacobs $1.75 million.

=== Signing with Matchroom Boxing ===
==== Jacobs vs. Arias ====
In September 2017, it was announced that Jacobs had signed with promotional outfit Matchroom Boxing. Jacobs had worked without a promotional outfit since his return. The deal would see Jacobs' fights be televised on HBO. It was later announced that Jacobs would face Luis Arias on November 11 at the Nassau Coliseum. Jacobs dominated Arias from beginning to end and scored a flash knockdown in round 11 to win a unanimous decision 118–109, 119–108, and 120–107. This was Jacobs' first decision win in a 12-round bout. According to CompuBox Stats, Jacobs landed 184 of 581 punches thrown (32%), while Arias landed 88 of 318 (28%). Jacobs outlanded Arias in every single round. The bout averaged 706,000 and peaked at 765,000 viewers.

==== Jacobs vs. Sulęcki ====
In February 2018, after weeks of speculation, it was officially announced that Jacobs would fight Polish boxer Maciej Sulęcki (26–0, 10 KOs) on April 28 at the Barclays Center in New York City on HBO. On March 30, the WBA elevated the fight to be an eliminator for their middleweight title. Despite being a significant favorite at 15-1, Jacobs remained cautious about Sulęcki, acknowledging the unpredictability of boxing and the potential danger posed by an opponent with "nothing to lose." Sulęcki was not worried about talks of him being at a weigh disadvantage and anticipated weighing over 180 pounds at the time of the fight, stating that he will be the bigger fighter in the ring. Jacobs weighed 159.6 pounds and Sulęcki weighed 159.2 pounds for his first official fight at middleweight.

Jacobs dropped Sulęcki in the last round, winning the fight via unanimous decision, in a bout where he was comfortably in control. Jacobs controlled distance and pace through most of the fight, dictating exchanges and keeping Sulęcki at range. Sulęcki displayed toughness and resilience, absorbing punches and staying competitive, but he struggled to hurt Jacobs, who effectively managed the inside and landed power shots Jacobs repeatedly encouraged exchanges, demonstrating his experience and tactical patience. In the 12th round, Jacobs landed a solid right hand that knocked Sulęcki down. Sulęcki recovered quickly and completed the fight on his feet, but the outcome was already decided. The scorecards read 116–111, 117–110 and 115–112 for Jacobs. Despite his victory, Jacobs rated his performance as a B-minus, indicating that he believes there is room for improvement. He acknowledged Sulęcki's toughness and skill, recognizing him as a worthy opponent. CompuBox showed that Jacobs landed 205 of 631 punches thrown (32%) and Sulęcki landed 143 of 657 (22%). The fight averaged 811,000 viewers and peaked at 874,000 viewers.

=== IBF middleweight champion ===
==== Jacobs vs. Derevyanchenko ====
On April 27, the IBF ordered Gennady Golovkin to defend his title against Ukrainian contender Sergiy Derevyanchenko (12–0, 10 KOs). This came after the Golovkin vs. Alvarez rematch broke down and Golovkin decided to fight Vanes Martirosyan on May 5. The IBF allowed Golovkin to fight Martirosyan as long as he would fight Derevyanchenko afterwards. On June 6, Golovkin was stripped of his IBF world title due to not adhering to the IBF rules. The IBF granted Golovkin an exception to fight Martirosyan although they would not sanction the fight, however told Golovkin's team to start negotiating and fight mandatory challenger Derevyanchenko by August 3, 2018. The IBF released a statement in detail. On June 25, the IBF ordered a purse bid to take place for Jacobs vs. Derevyanchenko on June 11. On July 20, according to Ringtv, the fight would take place for the vacant IBF middleweight title on November 10, 2018 at the Nassau Veterans Memorial Coliseum, Uniondale, New York. Jacobs expressed reluctance about fighting Derevyanchenko, primarily due to the complexities arising from their shared trainer, Andre Rozier. Despite this, both fighters were committed to competing for the vacant title. Rozier worked with Jacobs and Gary Stark Sr., who, alongside Rozier, trained Derevyanchenko, would be present in Derevyanchenko's corner. The two boxers had sparred over 300 rounds together.

There was a crowd of 4,691 packed in the arena. Jacobs scored a knockdown, on his way to defeat Derevyanchenko via 12-round split decision to claim the vacant IBF title after an intense, closely contested battle. After a cautious opening, Derevyanchenko landed a big right hook, but Jacobs responded with a big overhand right, dropping Derevyanchenko for the first time in his career. This set the tone, allowing Jacobs to assert control throughout the fight Later, Derevyanchenko adopted an aggressive, forward-moving style, targeting Jacobs’ body and head, especially when Jacobs was pinned against the ropes. Jacobs countered effectively with sharp, precise punches, including jabs, hooks, and uppercuts, keeping Derevyanchenko cautious while scoring clean shots From the sixth round, both engaged in slugfests, exchanging heavy shots to the head and body. Jacobs managed to withstand the attack and land counter punches, which turned out to be crucial in maintaining his lead in the fight. In the final rounds, Derevyanchenko intensified his pressure, attempting to dominate the closing stages, but Jacobs held firm, using his strong right hand and ring generalship to fend off attacks. Julie Lederman scored the bout 114-113 for Derevyanchenko, but was overruled by Steve Weisfeld and Tom Schreck, who both scored it 115-112 for Jacobs. During the post-fight, Jacobs said, "He's a true competitor. I knew exactly what I was getting into when I took this fight. I take my hat off to him. Nothing but respect. I knew it would be hard, and I had to dig deep. I used my range and boxed on the back foot. Those are my best attributes." According to CompuBox, Jacobs landed 181 of 578 punches (31%), whereas Derevyanchenko connected with 160 of 658 (24%). Jacobs' purse for the fight was $1.6 million and Derevyanchenko took a $462,500 purse.

Jacobs wanted to rematch Golovkin, however felt he would not gain anything, as Golovkin was no longer world champion. After the fight, Jacobs immediately called for a fight against Saul Álvarez. He noted that holding the IBF belt enhanced his negotiating power and increased his chances of securing high-profile fights, particularly against Alvarez, whom he is eager to face. He was not interested in a rematch with Derevyanchenko and felt the fight was not close as the judges saw it. He admitted to losing some of the middle rounds, but did not believe it was enough to have a scorecard against him.

The fight averaged 500,000 viewers on HBO and peaked at 553,000 viewers.

==== Jacobs vs. Álvarez ====
In his next fight, Jacobs faced Mexican boxer Canelo Álvarez, in a bid to unify his IBF title with the WBA, WBC and The Ring middleweight titles. In a mostly tactical bout, both fighters managed to avoid a lot of punches. Canelo proved to be the more elusive and efficient of the two, winning the fight via unanimous decision, 116–112, 115–113 and 115–113 to unify the middleweight belts.

=== Super middleweight ===
==== Jacobs vs. Chávez Jr ====
On September 11, 2019, Matchroom announced plans for a fight card on December 14, which would include Jacob's debut in the super middleweight division. He was anticipated to headline the event against 33-year-old Julio César Chávez Jr. (51-3-1, 33 KOs), who had recently won by knockout in the first round against Evert Bravo, a result that drew criticism for facing a lower-level opponent. On October 20, Eddie Hearn stated the fight was close to being finalized, to take place at the MGM Grand in Las Vegas, streaming on DAZN in the United States. On October 31, the fight faced uncertainty when Chávez Jr. did not adhere to the random drug testing mandated by the NSAC, resulting in his suspension. Chávez Jr. had a history of drug-related issues and difficulties with weight management. Consequently, Matchroom had already put contingency plans in place by including Gabriel Rosado on the undercard, ready to step in to fight Jacobs if necessary. Although he was enrolled in the WBC Clean Boxing Program, efforts to reach Chávez Jr. for testing at Wild Card Gym were unsuccessful, leading to his suspension until November 20. On November 8, Matchroom formally announced the fight scheduled for December 20 at the Talking Stick Resort Arena in Phoenix, Arizona, despite the suspension. For the fight, Jacob trained with Fareed Samad, who has worked with notable fighters such as Zab Judah and Devin Haney, instead of his long time trainer Andre Rozier. Jacobs mentioned that the separation was due to financial disagreements, but he expressed that he still holds respect for Rozier and felt a change was necessary at this point in his career. Regarding the split, Rozier said, “Danny has to do what he has to do, I’ve got nothing to say about Danny. As far as I’m concerned, I’m done with him. He hasn’t been good to me. I treated him like he was like my son. Sometimes you have to let them go.”

NSAC executive director Bob Bennett criticised of Hearn’s management of Chávez Jr.'s refusal to provide a test sample on October 24. He issued a formal letter indicating possible grounds for disciplinary action against Matchroom if they did not adhere to Nevada law concerning the matter. Chávez Jr. prepared for the fight by working with Freddie Roach, even though they had parted ways a year earlier. Roach mentioned that Chávez Jr. proposed a significant payment, which Roach declined, emphasizing his preference for dedication rather than financial motivation. After a discussion, they decided to work together. Speaking on the fight announcement, Jacobs said, “I am thrilled to be making my debut at super middleweight on December 20 against Julio Cesar Chávez. I’ve achieved a dream of becoming a world champion at middleweight and now I am seeking to secure my legacy by becoming a two-weight world champion." Chávez Jr. described it as a "perfect fight" for him, to move him a step closer to a world championship. When discussing Chávez's suspension, Hearn stated that no contracts were in place at that time, meaning Chávez was not required to take the test. Hearn also noted that if Chávez failed to make weight, Rosado would take his place in the main event. On November 20, the NSAC unanimously decided to extend the suspension until December 18. This decision increased the uncertainty surrounding the fight. The Arizona Boxing and MMA Commission still needed to approve the match, though Chávez Jr.'s refusal to undergo testing was expected to make this more difficult. Hearn explored other drug testing services, specifically Drug Free Sports, which are utilized in various sports. On December 6, it was reported that Chávez Jr. had filed a lawsuit against the NSAC. Submitted to the District Court of Clark County, the lawsuit was seeking declaratory relief and a preliminary injunction to allow the fight to proceed as planned. His legal team argues that the suspension was unlawful, as he did not hold a boxing license with the commission, indicating he was not required to comply with their testing policy. Chávez Jr. had not fought in Nevada since May 2017 and did not have an active Federal ID, which expired in 2023. A court date was scheduled for December 17, during fight week, where Chávez Jr. was able to secure a Temporary Restraining Order, which cleared him to fight Jacobs.

Many thought the controversy had ended until Chávez Jr. stepped on the scales and recorded a weight of 172.7 pounds, nearly 5 pounds over the super middleweight limit. Jacobs weighed in at 167.8 pounds. Jacobs had to decide whether to fight Rosado but chose to fight Chávez Jr. instead, due to Chávez Jr.'s greater name recognition. As a result, Chávez Jr. agreed to give up $1 million from his $3 million purse to Jacobs.

In front of over 10,000 fans, Jacobs won by fifth-round TKO after Chávez Jr. chose not to continue. The fight was competitive but largely favored Jacobs. Fans expressed their dissatisfaction with Chávez Jr.'s decision to stop fighting. The earlier rounds saw Chávez Jr. deliver effective punches, but Jacobs adapted his approach, utilizing lateral movement and targeting the body. The fight concluded in the fifth round when Chávez Jr. reported breathing difficulties and a broken nose, prompting the referee to stop the contest. The audience reacted negatively to the stoppage, throwing debris into the ring out of frustration regarding Chávez Jr.'s unexpected withdrawal. Chávez Jr. then left the ring and went backstage. After the fight, Jacobs expressed his desire for significant matches in the division. According to CompuBox, Jacobs landed 61 of 223 punches (27%), whereas Chávez Jr. landed 35 of 116 (30%).

Chávez Jr. later accused Jacobs of fighting dirty, including headbutts and elbows, which he claimed caused his injury. He said, “I apologize to the fans. I’d love to have a rematch. I got headbutted, he fought a dirty fight, and didn’t even take a point away. He would have been able to continue doing the dirty work.”

==== Jacobs vs. Rosado ====
On September 16, 2020, Eddie Hearn announced a fall schedule that included Jacobs' return to headline a card on Thanksgiving Weekend. No opponent was specified, but there were rumors suggesting it could be 34-year-old Gabriel Rosado (25–12–1, 14 KOs), who was a standby opponent for Jacobs' previous fight. Executives at DAZN suggested British boxer John Ryder as a possible opponent in conjunction with the launch of DAZN in the UK. On September 30, terms were reached between Jacobs and Rosado. Rosado's record was (2-3-1) in his last six fights. The fight was announced a few days later to take place on November 27 at the Hard Rock Live at Seminole Hard Rock Hotel & Casino in Hollywood, Florida. The fight was crucial for Rosado, who had lost to several top fighters, marking a potential last chance for a high-profile win. The two were involved in trash talk for over a year, with Jacobs eager to silence Rosado. He said, “Gabe talked his way into this fight and now it’s time to see if he can back it up.” Jacob's also accused Rosado of not being more grateful, stating he was given the opportunity to fight him, rather than earning it. Jacob's weighed 167.6 pounds, whilst Rosado weighed in at the 168 pound limit.

In a largely underwhelming fight, Jacobs, who came in as the heavy favorite, had a rough time against Rosado, and scored a narrow split-decision win. Both were cautious, resulting in low punch output. Each landed 78 punches, combining for just 156 total landed shots, one of the lowest totals in a 12-round fight in 2020. The fight developed more as a strategic chess match than the expected slugfest. Jacobs focused early on bodywork and combinations, showing pointed jabs and occasional power shots in rounds six and seven. He lacked urgency in the later rounds, allowing Rosado to stay competitive and land notable shots, including a hard, straight right in round eleven. Rosado fought tactically, out-jabbing and countering Jacobs at times. He maintained activity even when Jacobs slowed, and felt he deserved the win, expressing frustration at the split decision. There was some confusion after the scores were read out with the ring announcer misstating the winner's city Philadelphia instead of Brooklyn, which momentarily had the fans believing Rosado had won. Two of the judges had it 115–113 for Jacobs, while the third judge had it 115–113 for Rosado. Jacobs admitted that he did not perform to his standards and apologised to fans. He felt the fight was more like a gym sparring session, due to the lack of crowd energy. Rosado felt hard done by the decision and believed he outboxed Jacob's.

==== Jacobs vs. Ryder ====
Jacob's was given a chance to prove himself again at super middleweight. On December 16, 2021, reports indicated that he was close to finalizing a deal to fight British boxer John Ryder (30-5, 17 KOs) in a 12-round bout, scheduled for February 12, 2022, in London, UK. Ryder was coming off a two-fight win streak. Before these discussions, Jacobs' team had attempted to arrange a bout with WBO light heavyweight champion Joe Smith Jr., but Smith ultimately chose to negotiate a title defense against Callum Johnson in January 2022. On January 6, the fight was formally announced to take place at the Alexandra Palace in London, well known to Brits as 'Ally Pally', which holds many PDC Darts tournaments and other sporting events. Hearn was hopeful that the winner would secure a fight against David Morrell, who held the WBA 'regular' belt. The fight was significant for Ryder, after his controversial loss to Callum Smith, and he was aiming to get back into world title contention. Jacobs reconnected with his former trainer, Andre Rozier, and felt revitalized both mentally and physically. He was treating every fight as a must-win and was aiming to become a two-weight world champion. Both weighed below the limit. Jacobs was 166.9 pounds and Ryder was slightly heavier, at 167 pounds.

Despite taking an early lead, Jacob's lost the fight via split decision after 12-rounds. He started strong, dominating the early rounds by utilizing his jab, footwork, and switching stances effectively to keep Ryder at bay. Jacobs looked comfortable and sharp, controlling rounds one through six, heading towards a comfortable points win. From round 6, Ryder started to push back and both began exchanging shots. This boosted Ryder's confidence. In the later rounds, Ryder landed strong combinations and effective inside work which troubled Jacobs. His aggressive approach shifted the momentum. Both boxers kept the pace in the championship rounds, with Jacob's boxing smart and using movement, but Ryder connected with well-times combinations. After the final bell, both raised their arms in the air, feeling they had done enough to secure the win. In the end, two judges scored the fight 115-113 for Ryder, and one scored 115-113 for Jacobs. The decision was controversial, as Jacobs’ early dominance led some observers to believe he had won. According to CompuBox, Ryder landed 135 of 448 punches (30%) and Jacobs landed 123 of 651 (19%). Jacobs relied heavily on his jab, but was ineffective with it, landing just 29 of 365 (8%). The fight marked a career-best performance for Ryder as he called out Saul “Canelo” Álvarez. Jacobs left the ring decisively. There was widespread support for Jacobs's in the aftermath of the fight. His manager, Keith Connolly, was strongly dissatisfied with the judges' scoring, claiming that Jacobs was "robbed" and that the decision did not reflect the fight's reality.

==== Jacobs vs. Mosley Jr. ====
Jacobs did not fight again for nearly two years. In September 2023, his trainer Rozier spoke to Tha Boxing Voice. He believed that despite both Jacobs and Jermall Charlo being inactive, there was still a lot of tension and interest from the fight fans and media for them to finally engage in a fight. He saw no necessity for either to take a tune-up fight. In January 2024, Rozier explained that the reason for the inactivity, was due to him dealing with personal matters. He was now looking to get in fighting shape and return to the ring in 2024. He wanted to set up a fight with Caleb Plant, as he believed a win there would reinvigorate Jacobs' career.

On June 4, 2024, it was announced that Jacob's would return to the ring on the undercard of Nate Diaz vs. Jorge Masvidal boxing rematch, on July 6, against Shane Mosley Jr. (21-4, 12 KOs), in a 10-round bout. On his ring return, Jacobs' said, “I can’t wait to get back in the ring and do what I love most. I’ve been training and I feel rejuvenated and ready to make another run to the top. This is a great opportunity on a big platform, and I’m coming to make the most of it. I’ve got a great opponent, but don’t blink, because I’m preparing to end this fight in style.” The card was scheduled to take place at the Honda Center in Anaheim, California. Mosley entered the fight on a four-fight win streak since losing a majority decision in 2021. Mosley felt a win would be a pivotal moment in his career, referencing Ryder's win over Jacobs in 2018. At the press conference held during fight week, Jacobs discussed his time away from the sport and the positive impact it had on him both mentally and physically. He expressed his desire to create a significant legacy in boxing and to earn a spot in the Hall of Fame. Jacobs weighed 169.2 pounds, 1.2 pounds over the super middleweight limit and Mosley Jr. came in at 167.6 pounds. Jacobs lost via unanimous decision, marking a career-worst two-fight losing streak. Mosley dominated the fight. He out-landed Jacobs 108 to 83, dictating the pace and landed clean shots. Mosley started strong and maintained pressure throughout, staying busy and sticking to his game plan, while Jacobs fought patiently but lacked volume and speed. In the eighth round, Jacobs suffered a cut over his left eye following a head clash. The judges scored the fight 100-90, 99-91, and 99-91 for Mosley.

=== Retirement ===
A week after the fight, on July 13, Jacobs announced his retirement from boxing. In a post via his social media, he wrote:

"I'm able to say I'm the first cancer survivor to be a boxing world champion, the biggest accomplishment I've ever [achieved], Being able to inspire others with my story has always made me feel like my life meant more than just fighting inside the ring. A true miracle man."

His manager Keith Connolly also paid tribute to the challenges Jacobs had to overcome during his life and boxing career. Jacobs retired with a record of (37 wins, with 30 knockouts and 5 losses.

In July 2025, Jacobs stated he would consider ending his retirement for a bout with YouTuber turned Professional boxer Jake Paul (12-1, 7 KOs).

== Personal life ==
In May 2011, Jacobs was diagnosed with osteosarcoma, a life-threatening form of bone cancer. After receiving successful treatment at NewYork–Presbyterian Hospital, he returned to the ring. Jacobs has a son.

== Professional boxing record ==
42 fights	37 wins	5 losses
By knockout	30	1
By decision	7	4

No.	Result	Record	Opponent	Type	Round, time	Date	Location	Notes
42	Loss	37–5	Shane Mosley Jr.	UD	10	Jul 6, 2024	Honda Center, Anaheim, California, U.S.	
41	Loss	37–4	John Ryder	SD	12	Feb 12, 2022	Alexandra Palace, London, England	
40	Win	37–3	Gabriel Rosado	SD	12	Nov 27, 2020	Hard Rock Live, Hollywood, Florida, U.S.	
39	Win	36–3	Julio César Chávez Jr.	RTD	5 (12) 3:00	Dec 20, 2019	Talking Stick Resort Arena, Phoenix, Arizona, U.S.	
38	Loss	35–3	Canelo Álvarez	UD	12	May 4, 2019	T-Mobile Arena, Paradise, Nevada, U.S.	Lost IBF middleweight title; For WBA (Super), WBC, and The Ring middleweight titles
37	Win	35–2	Sergiy Derevyanchenko	SD	12	Oct 27, 2018	Hulu Theater, New York City, New York, U.S.	Won vacant IBF middleweight title
36	Win	34–2	Maciej Sulęcki	UD	12	Apr 28, 2018	Barclays Center, New York City, New York, U.S.	
35	Win	33–2	Luís Arias	UD	12	Nov 11, 2017	Nassau Veterans Memorial Coliseum, Uniondale, New York, U.S.	
34	Loss	32–2	Gennady Golovkin	UD	12	Mar 18, 2017	Madison Square Garden, New York City, New York, U.S.	For WBA (Super), WBC, and IBO middleweight titles; IBF middleweight title at stake only for Golovkin after Jacobs missed same-day weight
33	Win	32–1	Sergio Mora	TKO	7 (12), 2:08	Sep 9, 2016	Santander Arena, Reading, Pennsylvania, U.S.	Retained WBA (Regular) middleweight title
32	Win	31–1	Peter Quillin	TKO	1 (12), 1:25	Dec 5, 2015	Barclays Center, New York City, New York, U.S.	Retained WBA (Regular) middleweight title
31	Win	30–1	Sergio Mora	TKO	2 (12), 2:55	Aug 1, 2015	Barclays Center, New York City, New York, U.S.	Retained WBA (Regular) middleweight title
30	Win	29–1	Caleb Truax	TKO	12 (12), 2:12	Apr 24, 2015	UIC Pavilion, Chicago, Illinois, U.S.	Retained WBA (Regular) middleweight title
29	Win	28–1	Jarrod Fletcher	TKO	5 (12), 2:58	Aug 9, 2014	Barclays Center, New York City, New York, U.S.	Won vacant WBA (Regular) middleweight title
28	Win	27–1	Milton Nuñez	TKO	1 (10), 2:25	Mar 15, 2014	Coliseo Rubén Rodríguez, Bayamón, Puerto Rico	
27	Win	26–1	Giovanni Lorenzo	TKO	3 (10), 2:05	Aug 19, 2013	Best Buy Theater, New York City, New York, U.S.	Won vacant WBC Continental Americas middleweight title
26	Win	25–1	Keenan Colins	TKO	4 (8), 2:06	Apr 27, 2013	Barclays Center, New York City, New York, U.S.	
25	Win	24–1	Chris Fitzpatrick	RTD	5 (8), 3:00	Dec 1, 2012	Madison Square Garden, New York City, New York, U.S.	
24	Win	23–1	Josh Lutheran	TKO	1 (8), 1:13	Oct 20, 2012	Barclays Center, New York City, New York, U.S.	
23	Win	22–1	Robert Kliewer	KO	1 (10), 1:44	Mar 5, 2011	Honda Center, Anaheim, California, U.S.	
22	Win	21–1	Jesse Orta	TKO	5 (8), 3:00	Dec 18, 2010	Colisée Pepsi, Quebec City, Quebec, Canada	
21	Loss	20–1	Dmitry Pirog	KO	5 (12), 0:57	Jul 31, 2010	Mandalay Bay Events Center, Paradise, Nevada, U.S.	For vacant WBO middleweight title
20	Win	20–0	Juan Astorga	TKO	2 (10), 0:51	May 15, 2010	The Theater at Madison Square Garden, New York City, New York, U.S.	Retained NABO middleweight title; Won vacant NABF middleweight title
19	Win	19–0	Jose Rodriguez Berrio	RTD	1 (8), 3:00	Mar 27, 2010	Hard Rock Hotel and Casino, Paradise, Nevada, U.S.	
18	Win	18–0	Ishe Smith	UD	10	Aug 22, 2009	Toyota Center, Houston, Texas, U.S.	Won vacant NABO middleweight title
17	Win	17–0	George Walton	TKO	8 (10), 1:59	Jun 26, 2009	Desert Diamond Casino, Tucson, Arizona, U.S.	
16	Win	16–0	Michael Walker	UD	8	May 2, 2009	MGM Grand Garden Arena, Paradise, Nevada, U.S.	
15	Win	15–0	Jose Varela	KO	2 (8), 1:29	Apr 24, 2009	UIC Pavilion, Chicago, Illinois, U.S.	
14	Win	14–0	Jose Luis Cruz	KO	1 (6), 2:59	Feb 28, 2009	Toyota Center, Houston, Texas, U.S.	
13	Win	13–0	Victor Lares	TKO	2 (8), 2:44	Dec 6, 2008	MGM Grand Garden Arena, Paradise, Nevada, U.S.	
12	Win	12–0	Jimmy Campbell	TKO	3 (6), 2:59	Nov 8, 2008	Madison Square Garden, New York City, New York, U.S.	
11	Win	11–0	Tyrone Watson	KO	1 (6), 2:29	Oct 18, 2008	Boardwalk Hall, Atlantic City, New Jersey, U.S.	
10	Win	10–0	Emmanuel Gonzalez	UD	6	Sep 27, 2008	Home Depot Center, Carson, California, U.S.	
9	Win	9–0	Ramon Espinoza	TKO	1 (6), 0:57	Sep 13, 2008	MGM Grand Garden Arena, Paradise, Nevada, U.S.	
8	Win	8–0	Sergio Rios	KO	1 (6), 2:46	Jul 23, 2008	Morongo Casino Resort & Spa, Cabazon, California, U.S.	
7	Win	7–0	Julio Perez	TKO	1 (6), 1:49	Jul 4, 2008	Dodge Arena, Hidalgo, Texas, U.S.	
6	Win	6–0	Jose Pena	TKO	1 (4), 0:53	May 3, 2008	Home Depot Center, Carson, California, U.S.	
5	Win	5–0	Leshon Sims	TKO	4 (4), 2:31	Apr 19, 2008	Thomas & Mack Center, Paradise, Nevada, U.S.	
4	Win	4–0	Matt Palmer	TKO	1 (4), 2:43	Mar 22, 2008	Morongo Casino Resort & Spa, Cabazon, California, U.S.	
3	Win	3–0	Alexander Volkov	TKO	2 (4), 2:57	Feb 16, 2008	MGM Grand Garden Arena, Paradise, Nevada, U.S.	
2	Win	2–0	Hector Lopez	KO	1 (4), 1:05	Jan 25, 2008	Cicero Stadium, Cicero, Illinois, U.S.	
1	Win	1–0	Jose Jesus Hurtado	TKO	1 (4), 0:29	Dec 8, 2007	MGM Grand Garden Arena, Paradise, Nevada, U.S.	

== Viewership ==
=== Pay-per-view bouts ===
Date	Fight	Billing	Buys	Revenue	Network	Country
March 18, 2017	Golovkin vs. Jacobs	Middleweight Madness	170,000	$10m	HBO	United States

=== Subscription sports streaming service bouts ===
No.	Date	Fight	Network
1	May 4, 2019	Canelo vs. Jacobs	DAZN
2	Dec 20, 2019	Jacobs vs. Chávez Jr.	DAZN
3	Nov 27, 2020	Jacobs vs. Rosado	DAZN
4	Feb 12, 2022	Jacobs vs. Ryder	DAZN

Sporting positions
Amateur boxing titles
Previous: Andre Berto	U.S. Golden Gloves middleweight champion 2004	Next: Brad Solomon
Previous: Edwin Rodríguez	U.S. middleweight champion 2006	Next: Fernando Guerrero
Regional boxing titles
Vacant Title last held by Aaron Mitchell	NABO middleweight champion August 22, 2009 – July 31, 2010; Failed to win world title	Vacant Title next held by Patrick Majewski
Vacant Title last held by Peter Manfredo Jr.	NABF middleweight champion May 15, 2010 – July 2010; Vacated	Vacant Title next held by Fernando Guerrero
Vacant Title last held by Osumanu Adama	WBC Continental Americas middleweight champion August 19, 2013 – March 2014; Vacated	Vacant Title next held by Tureano Johnson
World boxing titles
Vacant Title last held by Gennady Golovkin	WBA middleweight champion Regular title August 9, 2014 – March 18, 2017; Failed to win Super title	Vacant Title next held by Hassan N'Dam N'Jikam
Vacant Title last held by Gennady Golovkin	IBF middleweight champion October 27, 2018 – May 4, 2019	Succeeded by Canelo Álvarez
Awards
Previous: Victor Ortiz	ESPN Prospect of the Year; 2009	Next: Canelo Álvarez
Previous: Erik Morales	The Ring Comeback of the Year; 2012	Next: Manny Pacquiao
Inaugural recipient	PBC Round of the Year vs. Sergio Mora; Round 1; 2015	Next: Robert Easter Jr. vs. Richard Commey; Round 9
