= Shane Mosley vs. Ricardo Mayorga =

Professional boxing match (Sept. 27, 2008)

Night of the Welterweight Elite: Mosley vs. Mayorga
- Date: September 27, 2008
- Venue: Home Depot Center, Carson, California, U.S.
- Title(s) on the line: vacant WBA Inter-Continental light middleweight title

Tale of the tape
Boxer	Shane Mosley	Ricardo Mayorga
Nickname	Sugar	El Matador ("The Killer")
Hometown	Pomona, California, U.S.	Masaya, Nicaragua
Purse	$1,500,000	$550,000
Pre-fight record	44–5 (1) (37 KO)	28–6–1 (1) (22 KO)
Age	37 years	34 years, 11 months
Height	5 ft 9 in (175 cm)	5 ft 9 in (175 cm)
Weight	153 1/2 lb (70 kg)	153 1/2 lb (70 kg)
Style	Orthodox	Orthodox
Recognition	IBF; No. 2 Ranked Welterweight; WBA; No. 6 Ranked Welterweight; The Ring; No. 4 Ranked Welterweight; 3-division world champion	WBA; No. 1 Ranked Light Middleweight; WBC/WBO; No. 3 Ranked Light Middleweight; 2-division world champion

Result
- Mosley wins via 12th-round knockout

Shane Mosley vs. Ricardo Mayorga was a professional boxing match contested on September 27, 2008, for the vacant WBA Inter-Continental light middleweight title.

== Background ==
Negotiations for a Shane Mosley–Ricardo Mayorga fight began in mid-June 2008 after a planned Mosley vs. Sergio Mora WBC light middleweight title fight fell through days earlier. Mora had upset previous light middleweight champion Vernon Forrest a week earlier after which he entered into negotiations to face Mosley in his first defense, but Forrest had a rematch clause in his contract and demanded an immediate rematch from Mora, threatening legal action should he face another opponent, resulting in Mora and Mosley ending their negotiations and Mosley instead pivoting to Mayorga. In August, the Mosley–Mayorga fight was announced at a press conference held at The Biltmore Los Angeles at which Mayorga vowed to knock Mosley out within the first three rounds.

== Card Details ==
=== Berto vs. Forbes ===
In the co featured bout, Andre Berto made the first defence of his WBC welterweight title against No. 15 ranked Steve Forbes.

==== The fight ====
Berto consistently outpunched Forbes throughout winning the fight by unanimous decision with scores of 118–109 on two of the scorecards and 116–111 on the third scorecard.

Preceded by vs. Miguel Ángel Rodríguez	Andre Berto's bouts 27 September 2008	Succeeded by vs. Luis Collazo
Preceded by vs. Oscar De La Hoya	Steve Forbes's bouts 27 September 2008	Succeeded by vs. Jason Davis

=== Main Event ===
Mayorga got off to a fast start, taking the early rounds, though Mosley rebounded and starting in the fourth, found his footing and took a majority of the middle rounds, though neither fighter was in serious trouble and the fight remained close going into the 12th and final round. With less than 20 seconds left in the round, Mosley finally broke though, sending Mayorga down on his hands and knees. Mayorga was able to answer the referee's 10-count and resumed the fight with just 5 seconds left, but Mosley was able to deliver a left hook that sent Mayorga down on his back with a second remaining after which referee David Mendoza stopped the fight.

At the time of the stoppage Mosley led on two of three scorecards, 107–102 and 105–104 with the third judge having it for Mayorga, 105–104. HBO's unofficial ringside scorer Harold Lederman had it 107–102 for Mosley.

== Fight card ==
Confirmed bouts:

Weight Class	Weight		vs.		Method	Round	Time	Notes
Light Middleweight	154 lbs.	Shane Mosley	def.	Ricardo Mayorga	KO	12/12	2:59	^{note 1}
Welterweight	147 lbs.	Andre Berto (c)	def.	Steve Forbes	UD	12		^{note 2}
Preliminary bouts
Light Middleweight	154 lbs.	Luis Collazo	def.	Russell Jordan	TKO	8/8	2:28
Middleweight	160 lbs.	Craig McEwan	def.	Hilario Lopez	UD	8
Heavyweight	200+ lbs.	Ray Austin	def.	Domonic Jenkins	UD	8
Light heavyweight	170 lbs.	Marcus Johnson	def.	Julio Cesar De la Cruz	KO	7/8	1:44
Super middleweight	168 lbs.	Daniel Jacobs	def.	Emmanuel Gonzalez	UD	6
Lightweight	135 lbs.	Adrien Broner	def.	Ramon Flores	TKO	1/4	2:11
Welterweight	147 lbs.	Michael Anderson	def.	Carlos Garcia Hernandez	UD	4

^Note 1 For WBA Inter-Continental light middleweight title
^Note 2 For WBC welterweight title

== Broadcasting ==
Country	Broadcaster
Hungary	Sport 2
United States	HBO

Preceded by vs. Miguel Cotto	Shane Mosley's bouts 27 September 2008	Succeeded by vs. Antonio Margarito
Preceded by vs. Fernando Vargas	Ricardo Mayorga's bouts 27 September 2008	Succeeded by vs. Michael Walker
