= Steve Forbes (boxer) =

American boxer (born 1977)

Personal information
- Nickname: 2Pound
- Nationality: American
- Born: Stephen Phelipe Forbes; February 26, 1977 (age 49) Portland, Oregon, U.S.
- Height: 5 ft 7 1/2 in (171 cm)
- Weight: Super featherweight; Lightweight; Light welterweight; Welterweight

Boxing career
- Reach: 68 in (173 cm)
- Stance: Orthodox

Boxing record
- Total fights: 50
- Wins: 36
- Win by KO: 11
- Losses: 14

Stephen Phelipe "Stevie" Forbes (born February 26, 1977) is an American professional boxer. He is a former IBF super featherweight champion. Forbes' nickname of "2Pound" was in recognition of the fact that he was born weighing only 2 pounds.

== Amateur career ==
Forbes began boxing when he was 10 years old, training at the Matt Dishman Community Center on the Knott ST Boxing Team.

== Professional career ==
Forbes turned pro in 1996 at the age of nineteen, and ran off fourteen consecutive wins to begin his career before losing on March 11, 2000 against former WBC Featherweight champion Alejandro González.

After a few comeback fights, Forbes received a shot at the United States Boxing Association Super featherweight title On September 17, 2000, Forbes faced David Santos and won the title over twelve rounds by scores of 117–111, 118–110 and 120–108.

=== Capturing the title ===
Fighting for an eighth time in 2000, the No. 2 ranked Forbes was awarded a shot at the IBF super featherweight title when Diego Corrales vacated the title to fight WBC super featherweight Champion Floyd Mayweather Jr. This allowed Forbes to face No. 1 ranked John Brown for the vacant IBF title. Forbes won the IBF belt on December 3, 2000, by an 8th round TKO of Brown. Forbes also defeated Brown in a September 29, 2001, rematch, his first title defense. On August 18, 2002, he lost the title when he could not make weight for a fight against David Santos, whom Forbes had previously beaten for the USBA belt. The IBF title remained vacant until Forbes fought Carlos Hernández for it on October 14, 2003, a fight that Forbes lost by unanimous decision when the bout was stopped in the 10th round, due to an accidental headbutt, giving the belt to Hernandez.

=== The Contender ===
On the ESPN reality show "Contender Season 2" series debut, Forbes was chosen to be on the Gold Team. He was the favorite to win the show, by virtue of his previous success, and was the last fighter to be called out. Forbes won his first three bouts of the series, defeating Freddy Curiel, Nick Acevedo, and Cornelius Bundrage, but he lost to Grady Brewer in the final match.

=== After The Contender ===
On March 17, 2007 he lost a disputed, controversial decision to Demetrius Hopkins, Bernard Hopkins' nephew.

On October 6, 2007, Forbes won a split-decision upset over Francisco Bojado in a junior welterweight bout.

Forbes was defeated by Oscar De La Hoya on May 3 in Carson, California at the Home Depot Center by unanimous decision.

== Professional boxing record ==
50 fights	36 wins	14 losses
By knockout	11	1
By decision	25	13

No.	Result	Record	Opponent	Type	Round, time	Date	Location	Notes
50	Win	36–14	Tavorus Teague	UD	7 (7)	2019-04-06	Clackamas Armory, Clackamas	
49	Loss	35–14	Antonio Orozco	UD	8 (8)	2014-10-10	Fantasy Springs Resort Casino, Indio	
48	Loss	35–13	Emmanuel Lartei Lartey	UD	10 (10)	2014-06-07	Emerald Queen Casino, Tacoma	
47	Loss	35–12	Johan Pérez	MD	10 (10)	2013-01-12	BB&T Center, Sunrise	
46	Loss	35–11	Jessie Vargas	UD	10 (10)	2012-05-05	MGM Grand Garden Arena, Las Vegas	
45	Loss	35–10	Karim Mayfield	TKO	10 (10)	2011-06-17	Frank Erwin Center, Austin	
44	Loss	35–9	Jo Jo Dan	TD	6 (10)	2011-02-11	Bell Centre, Montreal	
43	Win	35–8	Roberto Valenzuela	KO	2 (8)	2010-12-17	Civic Center, Hammond	
42	Loss	34–8	Harrison Cuello	MD	8 (8)	2010-03-06	Mohegan Sun Arena, Uncasville	
41	Win	34–7	Jason Davis	TKO	2 (10)	2009-03-06	Spirit Mountain Casino, Grand Ronde	
40	Loss	33–7	Andre Berto	UD	12 (12)	Sep 27, 2008	Dignity Health Sports Park, Carson	For WBC welterweight title
39	Loss	33–6	Oscar De La Hoya	UD	12 (12)	2008-05-03	Dignity Health Sports Park, Carson	
38	Win	33–5	Francisco Bojado	SD	10 (10)	2007-10-06	Mandalay Bay Events Center, Las Vegas	
37	Loss	32–5	Demetrius Hopkins	UD	12 (12)	2007-03-17	Mandalay Bay Events Center, Las Vegas	For USBA Light welterweight title
36	Loss	32–4	Grady Brewer	SD	10 (10)	2006-09-26	Staples Center, Los Angeles	The Contender Finals
35	Win	32–3	Cornelius Bundrage	UD	5 (5)	2006-02-10	Contender Gymnasium, Pasadena	The Contender Semi-finals
34	Win	31–3	Nick Acevedo	SD	5 (5)	2006-02-01	Contender Gymnasium, Pasadena	The Contender Quarter-finals
33	Win	30–3	Freddy Curiel	UD	5 (5)	2006-01-29	Contender Gymnasium, Pasadena	The Contender Preliminary rounds
32	Win	29–3	Julio Sanchez Leon	KO	3 (10)	2005-11-19	Moda Center, Portland	
31	Win	28–3	Marteze Logan	UD	10 (10)	Nov 19, 2005	Silver Star Casino, Choctaw	
30	Win	27–3	Alfonso Garcia	KO	1 (6)	2005-04-07	Pechanga Resort & Casino, Temecula	
29	Win	26–3	Ricardo Barajas	SD	8 (8)	2004-12-16	Tachi Palace, Lemoore	
28	Win	25–3	Steve Quinonez	SD	10 (10)	2004-10-01	Spotlight 29 Casino, Coachella	
27	Loss	24–3	Yodsanan Sor Nanthachai	UD	12 (12)	2004-08-07	Foxwoods Resort Casino, Mashantucket	For WBA super featherweight title
26	Win	24–2	Arthur Cruz	TKO	2 (10)	2004-06-04	Chinook Winds Casino, Lincoln City	
25	Loss	23–2	Carlos Hernández	TD	10 (12)	2003-10-04	Staples Center, Los Angeles	For IBF super featherweight title
24	Win	23–1	Silverio Ortiz	UD	10 (10)	2003-04-26	Stratosphere, Las Vegas	
23	Win	22–1	Ronnie Longakit	TKO	5 (8)	2003-01-03	Thunderbird Wild West Casino, Norman	
22	Win	21–1	David Santos	SD	12 (12)	2002-08-18	Pechanga Resort & Casino, Temecula	
21	Win	20–1	John Brown	UD	12 (12)	2001-09-29	Miccosukee Resort & Gaming, Miami	Retained IBF super featherweight title
20	Win	19–1	John Brown	TKO	8 (12)	2000-12-03	Miccosukee Resort & Gaming, Miami	Won vacant IBF super featherweight title
19	Win	18–1	David Santos	UD	12 (12)	2000-09-17	Cobo Arena, Detroit	Won vacant USBA super featherweight title
18	Win	17–1	Moises Pedroza	UD	10 (10)	2000-08-18	Lucky Star Casino, Concho	
17	Win	16–1	Ernesto Zepeda	MD	10 (10)	2000-06-16	The Orleans, Las Vegas	
16	Win	15–1	Don Juan Futrell	UD	6 (6)	2000-05-19	Playboy Mansion, Beverly Hills	
15	Loss	14–1	Alejandro González	MD	12 (12)	2000-03-11	Fantasy Springs Resort Casino, Indio	For IBA lightweight title
14	Win	14–0	Juan Torres	UD	8 (8)	2000-01-22	Del Mar Fairgrounds, Del Mar	
13	Win	13–0	David Armstrong	MD	6 (6)	2000-01-09	Casino Magic, Bay Saint Louis	
12	Win	12–0	Ernesto Martinez	UD	10 (10)	1999-04-16	The Orleans, Las Vegas	
11	Win	11–0	Gustavo Tapia	UD	10 (10)	1999-02-26	The Orleans, Las Vegas	
10	Win	10–0	Juan Roberto Colin	UD	6 (6)	1998-12-26	The Orleans, Las Vegas	
9	Win	9–0	Martin Johnson	TKO	4 (6)	1998-12-11	Marksville	
8	Win	8–0	Jose Teran Torres	TKO	5 (6)	1998-11-27	The Orleans, Las Vegas	
7	Win	7–0	Teddy Worth	UD	4 (4)	1998-10-02	Expo Center, Dolton	
6	Win	6–0	Patrick Rand	UD	4 (4)	1998-06-09	Grand Casino, Biloxi	
5	Win	5–0	Octavio Suarez	UD	4 (4)	1997-05-31	Caesars Palace, Las Vegas	
4	Win	4–0	Gustavo Balderas	TKO	2 (4)	1997-05-09	The Orleans, Las Vegas	
3	Win	3–0	Sergio Benitez	TKO	1 (4)	1997-04-09	The Aladdin, Las Vegas	
2	Win	2–0	Ramon Aragon	UD	4 (4)	1997-02-13	The Aladdin, Las Vegas	
1	Win	1–0	Octavio Suarez	MD	4	1996-12-06	Lawlor Events Center, Reno, Nevada, U.S.	Professional debut

== See also ==
- List of super-featherweight boxing champions

Sporting positions
Regional boxing titles
Vacant Title last held by Derrick Gainer	USBA Super Featherweight Champion; September 17, 2000 – December 3, 2000	Vacant Title next held by Lamont Pearson
World boxing titles
Vacant Title last held by Diego Corrales	IBF Super featherweight champion December 3, 2000 – August 17, 2002; Stripped	Vacant Title next held by Carlos Hernández
