= Oscar De La Hoya vs. Floyd Mayweather Jr. =

Boxing match

The World Awaits
- Date: May 5, 2007
- Venue: MGM Grand Garden Arena, Paradise, Nevada, U.S.
- Title on the line: WBC super welterweight title

Tale of the tape
| Boxer | Oscar De La Hoya | Floyd Mayweather Jr. |
| Nickname | The Golden Boy | Pretty Boy |
| Hometown | East Los Angeles, California, U.S. | Grand Rapids, Michigan, U.S. |
| Purse | $52,000,000 | $25,000,000 |
| Pre-fight record | 38–4 (30 KO) | 37–0 (24 KO) |
| Age | 34 years, 3 months | 30 years, 2 months |
| Height | 5 ft 10 1/2 in (179 cm) | 5 ft 8 in (173 cm) |
| Weight | 154 lb (70 kg) | 150 lb (68 kg) |
| Style | Orthodox | Orthodox |
| Recognition | WBC; Super Welterweight Champion; The Ring; No. 5 Ranked Light Middleweight; 6-division world champion | WBC and The Ring; Welterweight Champion; The Ring No. 1 ranked pound-for-pound fighter 4-division world champion |

Result
- Mayweather Jr. wins via 12-round split decision (113–115, 116–112, 115–113)

Oscar De La Hoya vs. Floyd Mayweather Jr., billed as The World Awaits, was a professional boxing match contested on May 5, 2007, for the WBC super welterweight championship. At the time, the bout was the most lucrative boxing match ever, with over $130 million in generated revenue. Mayweather won by split decision over De La Hoya in 12 rounds.

== Background ==
The fight took place at the MGM Grand Garden Arena in Las Vegas, Nevada under the promotion of Golden Boy Promotions. It was contested at 154 pounds, with De La Hoya defending his WBC light middleweight championship.

Tickets sold out three hours after they went on sale on Saturday, January 27, 2007. With the sellout, the bout generated over $19 million in live gate, beating the previous record of $16,860,300 set by the June 28, 1997, heavyweight championship rematch between Evander Holyfield and Mike Tyson at the Thomas & Mack Center. The fight was televised on HBO pay-per-view, with the cost to watch the fight at $55 in the U.S.

=== Hype ===
As part of the buildup for the fight, HBO produced an unprecedented four-part prelude. The series, titled De La Hoya-Mayweather 24/7, aired installments on the final three Sundays of April, with the fourth installment airing on Thursday, May 3, two days before the fight. The series focused on each fighter's training and preparation for the bout.

A subplot to the fight concerned whether De La Hoya would be trained by Floyd Mayweather Sr., the estranged father of Mayweather Jr. Mayweather Sr. had served as De La Hoya's trainer since 2001. Mayweather Sr. announced his willingness to train De La Hoya after initially declining to oppose his son, but demanded a $2 million fee in light of the enormous revenue to be generated by the fight. De La Hoya declined to meet Mayweather Sr.'s demands, making a counteroffer of $500,000 guaranteed plus an additional $500,000 contingent on De La Hoya winning the fight. Ultimately, the sides were unable to come to an agreement and De La Hoya hired Freddie Roach to be his trainer instead.

Although Mayweather Sr. reunited with his son at the start of Floyd Jr.'s training camp, he had no official role, as Floyd Jr. opted to retain his uncle, Roger Mayweather, as his trainer instead. Mayweather Sr. left the camp by the end of April, upset over not being chosen as trainer and by comments made by his son and brother during the taping of the 24/7 show.

== The fight ==
During the early rounds De La Hoya had some success cutting off the ring, using his left jab and attempting to pound Mayweather on the inside. Despite his activity however, many of De La Hoya's punches appeared ineffective and landed on Mayweather's arms or shoulders. A pattern emerged in the middle rounds of De la Hoya pressing and throwing occasional flurries with Mayweather landing the clearer and cleaner shots.

Mayweather won by a split decision in 12 close-fought rounds, capturing the WBC title. Judges Jerry Roth (115–113) and Chuck Giampa (116–112) scored the fight for Mayweather while judge Tom Kaczmarek had De La Hoya winning, 115–113. Both HBO's unofficial scorer Harold Lederman and the Associated Press had it for Mayweather, 116–112. The Guardian's John Rawling scored it a draw 114–114, and the BBC's Ben Dirs had it a 115–115 draw. CompuBox had Mayweather out-landing De La Hoya 207–122 in total punches with better accuracy throughout the fight (43% vs 21%).

== Aftermath ==
Speaking after the bout Mayweather said "It was a hell of a fight but it was easy work for me. I out-punched him, I out-boxed him. He was rough, he was tough, but he couldn't beat me. I could see the shots coming. I stayed on the outside and made him miss. He's the best fighter of our era and I beat him." De la Hoya, meanwhile maintained he won the bout saying that "I thought I landed crisper punches. If I didn't press the fight there would be no fight. I hurt him with a few punches that I know he felt. I was pressing and wanted to stop him. I was trying to close the show. I am the champion and you've got to do more than that to beat the champion."

=== Fight earnings ===
The De La Hoya-Mayweather fight set the record for most PPV buys for a boxing match with 2.4 million households, beating the previous record of 1.99 million for Evander Holyfield-Mike Tyson II. Around $136 million in revenue was generated by the PPV. It was surpassed in 2015 by Mayweather vs. Pacquiao, which generated more than 400 million dollars from 4.6 million households in PPV buys, thus becoming the most lucrative fight in history and one of the most lucrative sport events of all time. Factoring in the percentages, Mayweather earned $25 million for the fight whereas Oscar De La Hoya ended up earning $52 million, the highest purse ever for a fighter at the time. Mayweather ended up surpassing those earnings in 2013 with a purse of $88 million for Mayweather vs. Álvarez. The previous record had been $35 million, held by Tyson and Holyfield.

=== September 2008 rematch ===
De La Hoya and Mayweather were scheduled for a rematch on September 20, 2008. However, unlike the first fight, the fight would have been contracted for 147 lbs. or the welterweight limit. The first fight was contracted at light middleweight or 154 lbs and De La Hoya's WBC junior middleweight title was on the line. However, Mayweather would have come in as champion and defend his WBC/The Ring welterweight titles. As a tune-up fight, De La Hoya fought Stephen Forbes (33–6) on May 3, with Floyd Mayweather Sr. as his trainer. De La Hoya (39–5, 30 KOs) looked extremely sluggish but ultimately won a unanimous decision over Forbes, 119–109, 119–109 and 120–108.

The rematch never took place due to Mayweather's retirement in 2008 and De La Hoya's retirement in 2009, although Mayweather would return to boxing in 2009, eventually retiring for good in 2017.

== Undercard ==
Confirmed bouts:

| Weight Class | | vs. | | Method | Round | Time |
|---|---|---|---|---|---|---|
| Light Middleweight | (United States) Floyd Mayweather Jr. | def. | (United States) Oscar De La Hoya | SD | 12 | |
| Super Featherweight | (Philippines) Rey Bautista | def. | (Argentina) Sergio Manuel Medina | UD | 12 | |
| Welterweight | (The Bahamas) Ernest Johnson | vs. | (United States) Wes Ferguson | SD | 8 | |
| Lightweight | (Philippines) AJ Banal | def. | (Mexico) Juan Alberto Rosas | UD | 6 | |
| Welterweight | (Mexico) Christian Solano | def. | (United Kingdom) John O'Donnell | TKO | 2/8 | 1:50 |
| Flyweight | (Australia) Billy Dib | def. | (Mexico) Jose Alberto Gonzalez | UD | 8 | |
| Lightweight | (United Kingdom) John Murray | def. | (United States) Lorenzo Bethea | TKO | 7/10 | 0:28 |
| Cruiserweight | (Cuba) Carlos Duarte | def. | (United States) Calvin Rooks | TKO | 2/4 | 1:54 |

== Broadcasting ==
| Country | Broadcaster |
|---|---|
| Philippines | ABS-CBN |
| United Kingdom | Sky Sports |
| United States | HBO |

| Preceded by vs. Ricardo Mayorga | Oscar De La Hoya's bouts 5 May 2007 | Succeeded by vs. Steve Forbes |
| Preceded by vs. Carlos Baldomir | Floyd Mayweather Jr.'s bouts 5 May 2007 | Succeeded by vs. Ricky Hatton |
