= Freddy Curiel =

American boxer (born 1974)

Personal information
- Nickname: Furious Freddy
- Nationality: American
- Born: Freddy Curiel; November 11, 1974 (age 51) La Vega, Dominican Republic
- Weight: Welterweight

Boxing career
- Stance: Orthodox

Boxing record
- Total fights: 23
- Wins: 18
- Win by KO: 8
- Losses: 6
- Draws: 2
- No contests: 0

Freddy Curiel (born November 11, 1974) is an American professional boxer. Curiel was born in La Vega, Dominican Republic and was a contestant on the ESPN reality show, Contender Season 2.

== Biography ==
Curiel began boxing as an amateur at age 14, and quickly turned professional at age 17. He ended his career in 2002, to focus on his home-improvement business, but once it was successful, he returned to the ring for practice in 2005, in the hope of making a second go at professional boxing.

On the "Contender Season 2" series debut, Curiel was picked for the "Blue Team." He lost his preliminary bout to Steve Forbes by unanimous decision, though he gave Forbes a tough fight in the process.

=== Victory TKO on The Contender Challenge 2007: UK vs US Fight#2 ===
Curiel entered the ring with a 16-6-2 record and a relatively inactive period of activity (he retired in 2002 and returned to the ring in 2006 for the Contender boxing reality show and had only one fight since losing in the first round of the show). Curiel's opponent was the younger and more recently active Ross "The Boss" Minter (son of former Middleweight champ Alan Minter) with a record of 17-1-1. Minter also had his challenges with layoffs—although he had recently fought in 2007, he had only one fight in 2006.

Minter, a popular boxer in the UK with a reputation as a considerate and polite competitor, dominated the early rounds of the fight. Minter was the bigger fighter and was in excellent condition which quickly showed with his power shots and gritty in-fighting. Unfortunately for Minter he continued to be plagued by the cuts which had been seen in his previous fights. Minter was also able to open a cut on Curiel although it was disputed as being caused by a headbutt.

While Minter was strong up to the seventh round of the eight round bout, Curiel's experience started to show and he began to land more authoritatively. In the eighth round Curiel's corner told him he had to score a KO to win, although Teddy Atlas had the fight 67-66 for Minter—a close fight. Both fighters started the round with hard punches and Curiel's right eye started to swell dramatically. In the last minute of the round Curiel countered a wide right thrown by Minter with a laser straight hard right which dropped Minter to the canvas. Minter attempted to get up, but was still dazed from the punch and fell down a second time. The referee called the fight and Curiel pulled out a dramatic victory from what appeared to be a certain points loss. Curiel demonstrated considerable sportsmanship by walking Minter around the ring with his hand raised and encouraged the fans to applaud their local fighter.
