= Floyd Mayweather Sr. =

American former professional boxer (born 1952)

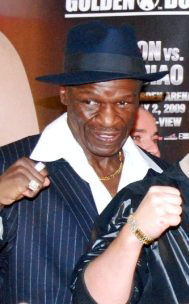
- Mayweather in 2009

Personal information
- Born: Floyd Joy Mayweather; October 19, 1952 (age 73) Amory, Mississippi, U.S.
- Height: 5 ft 8 in (173 cm)
- Weight: Welterweight

Boxing career
- Stance: Orthodox

Boxing record
- Total fights: 35
- Wins: 28
- Win by KO: 18
- Losses: 6
- Draws: 1

Floyd Joy Mayweather Sr. (born October 19, 1952) is an American boxing trainer and former professional boxer who competed from 1973 to 1990. Fighting at welterweight during the 1970s and 1980s, Mayweather Sr. was known for his defensive abilities and overall knowledge of boxing strategy. He is the father and former trainer of Floyd Mayweather Jr., and also father to Justin Mayweather, an American boxer residing in Las Vegas.

== Boxing career ==
Mayweather Sr.'s boxing record was 28–6–1 (18 TKOs), and he won one contest during the U.S. Championship Tournament in 1977, against Miguel Barreto. He broke his hand and was knocked out in a fight against Sugar Ray Leonard in 1978. Four months later, he was shot in the leg in a family dispute which virtually ended his career.

=== Trainer ===
As a trainer, Mayweather preaches defense and a stiff jab. He taught many of his boxers the Michigan Defense which uses a defensive technique known as the shoulder roll, in which the fighter uses his front shoulder to deflect blows and limit their impact. He has on many occasions, including HBO's Mayweather-Hatton 24/7, claimed to be Floyd Mayweather Sr., 'The Greatest Dog of All Time'".

Floyd Mayweather Sr. taught Mayweather Jr. to punch when he was still a toddler in Grand Rapids, Michigan. His training was disrupted by a five-and-a-half-year prison sentence on a drug-dealing conviction, and he resumed training his son 14 fights into his professional career. He had a public falling out with his son in 2000, and his brother Roger took over training Mayweather Jr.

He is the former trainer of top light heavyweight Chad Dawson, former two-division champion Joan Guzmán and women's champion Laila Ali. He is well known for his stint as Oscar De La Hoya's trainer from 2001 through 2006. He said he would train De La Hoya for his May 5, 2007, fight against his son, but demanded a $2 million fee to do so. After considerable deliberation, De La Hoya opted not to hire Mayweather Sr. and announced on January 30, 2007, he would use Freddie Roach instead.

The snub briefly reunited father and son, with Floyd Sr. turning up at the Mayweather Jr. boxing gym, while Roger (who had been banned from being in the corner at boxing matches for 12 months for starting a riot during Floyd Jr.'s bout against Zab Judah on April 8, 2006, when he attacked Judah) served six months in jail for a domestic assault. But when Roger was released, the situation became awkward because of the brothers’ rivalry.

Floyd Jr. chose Roger as his trainer and Floyd Sr. left again, claiming that the father-son relationship was "back to square one" for choosing Roger over his own father again. Floyd Sr. agreed to once again train De La Hoya in anticipation for Mayweather Jr. – De La Hoya II presented by Golden Boy Promotions. However, due to disagreements with how revenues would be divided amongst the two fighters, the bout was canceled. Mayweather Sr. trained Manchester's Ricky Hatton for seven weeks prior to his bout against Paulie Malignaggi on November 22, 2008, at the MGM Grand in Las Vegas.

A proposed March 2010 fight between Mayweather Jr. and Manny Pacquiao fell by the wayside in January 2010 when the camps representing both fighters could not agree on a timeline for drug testing for the fight. The Mayweathers had suggested that Manny Pacquiao was aided by performance-enhancing drugs. Pacquiao filed a defamation suit against them that was eventually settled in 2012.

Mayweather trained UFC fighter B.J. Penn for two weeks.

In May 2013, for the first time in 13 years, Floyd Jr. announced that Floyd Sr. would return as his trainer against Robert Guerrero. While some speculated this was because of the bloody nose Jr. got in an otherwise dominant performance against Miguel Cotto (a change to the more defensive-oriented Floyd Sr. over the offensive Roger was seen as logical), Floyd Jr. cited his uncle Roger's health issues, diabetes, and poor vision as rationale for the change. Sr. has remained the trainer of Jr. ever since and trained him to victory in his fight over Manny Pacquiao.

== Personal life ==
Mayweather Sr. has the lung disease sarcoidosis.

Floyd’s younger brother, Roger was WBC super featherweight and super lightweight champion. The youngest brother, Jeff, held the IBO super featherweight title.

== Professional boxing record ==
35 fights	28 wins	6 losses
By knockout	24	2
By decision	4	4
Draws	1	

No.	Result	Record	Opponent	Type	Round, time	Date	Location	Notes
35	Loss	28–6–1	Roger Turner	UD	10	Nov 3, 1990	Welsh Auditorium, Grand Rapids, Michigan, U.S.	
34	Loss	28–5–1	Marlon Starling	UD	12	Apr 26, 1985	Tropicana, Atlantic City, New Jersey, U.S.	For USBA welterweight title
33	Loss	28–4–1	Clayton Hires	UD	10	Apr 12, 1984	Portland Meadows, Portland, Oregon, U.S.	
32	Win	28–3–1	Calvin Porter	TKO	8 (10)	Oct 26, 1983	Sands, Atlantic City, New Jersey, U.S.	
31	Win	27–3–1	Jose Baret	TKO	8 (10), 2:48	Jun 10, 1983	Felt Forum, New York City, New York, U.S.	
30	Win	26–3–1	Greg Harper	TKO	4	Apr 16, 1983	Catholic Central High School, Muskegon, Michigan, U.S.	
29	Win	25–3–1	Greg Netter	TKO	3	Feb 19, 1983	Grand Rapids, Michigan, U.S.	
28	Win	24–3–1	Gary Jones	PTS	10	Jan 19, 1983	UAW Hall 659, Flint, Michigan, U.S.	
27	Draw	23–3–1	Allen Braswell	PTS	8	Jul 17, 1982	Felt Forum, New York, New York, U.S.	
26	Win	23–3	Agapito Ramirez	TKO	6 (10)	Mar 24, 1982	Las Vegas, Nevada, U.S.	
25	Win	22–3	Larry McCall	TKO	10	Oct 17, 1981	Traverse City, Michigan, U.S.	
24	Win	21–3	Larry McCall	TKO	10	Jul 29, 1981	Civic Center, Saginaw, Michigan, U.S.	
23	Win	20–3	Tony Taylor	TKO	5	Jul 2, 1981	Cobo Hall, Detroit, Michigan, U.S.	
22	Loss	19–3	Marlon Starling	UD	10	Mar 9, 1981	Exhibition Center, Hartford, Connecticut, U.S.	
21	Win	19–2	Bobby Crawford	TKO	3	May 22, 1980	Holland, Michigan, U.S.	
20	Win	18–2	Lynn Lustig	TKO	2	Apr 19, 1980	Muskegon, Michigan, U.S.	
19	Win	17–2	Sam Lantion	TKO	4	Mar 22, 1980	Grand Rapids, Michigan, U.S.	
18	Win	16–2	Calvin Straughter	TKO	3	Jan 9, 1980	Holland, Michigan, U.S.	
17	Loss	15–2	Sugar Ray Leonard	TKO	10 (10), 2:16	Sep 9, 1978	Civic Center, Providence, Rhode Island, U.S.	
16	Win	15–1	Art McKnight	TKO	10	Aug 25, 1978	Houston, Texas, U.S.	
15	Win	14–1	Pablo Rodriguez	TKO	10	Dec 10, 1977	Ford Fieldhouse, Grand Rapids, Michigan, U.S.	
14	Win	13–1	Sammy Rookard	TKO	10 (10)	Aug 4, 1977	Jackson, Michigan, U.S.	
13	Win	12–1	Ron Pettigrew	TKO	7 (10)	Jun 11, 1977	Center High School, Jackson, Michigan, U.S.	
12	Win	11–1	Miguel Barreto	TKO	8	Mar 27, 1977	Randolph Air Force Base, Universal City, Texas, U.S.	
11	Win	10–1	Aundra Love	TKO	10	Aug 22, 1976	Flint, Michigan, U.S.	
10	Win	9–1	Joe Armour	TKO	8	Jul 24, 1976	Kalamazoo, Michigan, U.S.	
9	Win	8–1	Freddie Jones	TKO	3 (6)	May 25, 1976	Center Arena, Seattle, Washington, U.S.	
8	Win	7–1	Bobby Orr	TKO	8, 1:45	Apr 23, 1976	IMA Sports Arena, Flint, Michigan, U.S.	
7	Win	6–1	Darryl Penn	UD	6	Apr 21, 1976	Center Arena, Seattle, Washington, U.S.	
6	Win	5–1	Tyrone Phelps	SD	8	Jul 23, 1975	Capital Centre, Landover, Maryland, U.S.	
5	Loss	4–1	Tyrone Phelps	TKO	2 (6), 2:40	May 22, 1975	Steel Workers Union Hall, Baltimore, Maryland, U.S.	
4	Win	4–0	CJ Faison	KO	3 (6), 1:13	May 8, 1975	Steel Workers Union Hall, Baltimore, Maryland, U.S.	
3	Win	3–0	Ernie Wicher	TKO	1 (4), 1:37	Apr 29, 1975	Capital Centre, Landover, Maryland, U.S.	
2	Win	2–0	Sparky Wheeler	TKO	2 (4), 2:45	April 11, 1975	Steel Workers Union Hall, Baltimore, Maryland, U.S.	
1	Win	1–0	Ron Pettigrew	PTS	4 (4)	Nov 21, 1974	Highland Park, U.S.	
