= Dairo Esalas =

Colombian boxer (born 1974)

Personal information
- Nickname: Yarará
- Nationality: Colombian
- Born: Dairo José Esalas Berrio; 27 January 1974 (age 52) San Onofre, Sucre, Colombia
- Height: 5 ft 10 in (1.78 m)
- Weight: Welterweight; Light Welterweight; Lightweight; Super Featherweight

Boxing career
- Reach: 189 cm (74 in)
- Stance: Orthodox

Boxing record
- Total fights: 48
- Wins: 31
- Win by KO: 25
- Losses: 17
- Draws: 0
- No contests: 0

Dairo José Esalas Berrio (born 27 January 1974) is a Colombian professional boxer. As an amateur, he competed in the men's light welterweight event at the 1996 Summer Olympics.

== Professional career ==
In November 2007, Esalas upset the former world champion, DeMarcus Corley at the Double Tree Westshore Hotel in Tampa, Florida.

=== Ortiz vs. Esalas ===
On 3 May 2008, Esalas was knocked out by title contender Victor Ortíz at the Home Depot Center in Carson, California.
