= Golden Boy Promotions =

American boxing promoter

- Type: Private
- Industry: Sports Media
- Founded: 2002
- Founder: Oscar De La Hoya
- Headquarters: Los Angeles, California, United States
- Key people: Oscar De La Hoya (Chairman and CEO); Eric Gomez (President); Robert Gasparri (COO); Bernard Hopkins Jr. (Business partner)

Golden Boy Promotions, Inc. is an American boxing promotional firm based in Los Angeles, California. The company was established in 2002 by eight-time world champion (in six divisions) Oscar De La Hoya, borrowing his nickname "Golden Boy."

== History ==
In 2005, Golden Boy Enterprises announced the formation of Golden Boy Partners, a company focused on urban development in Latino communities.

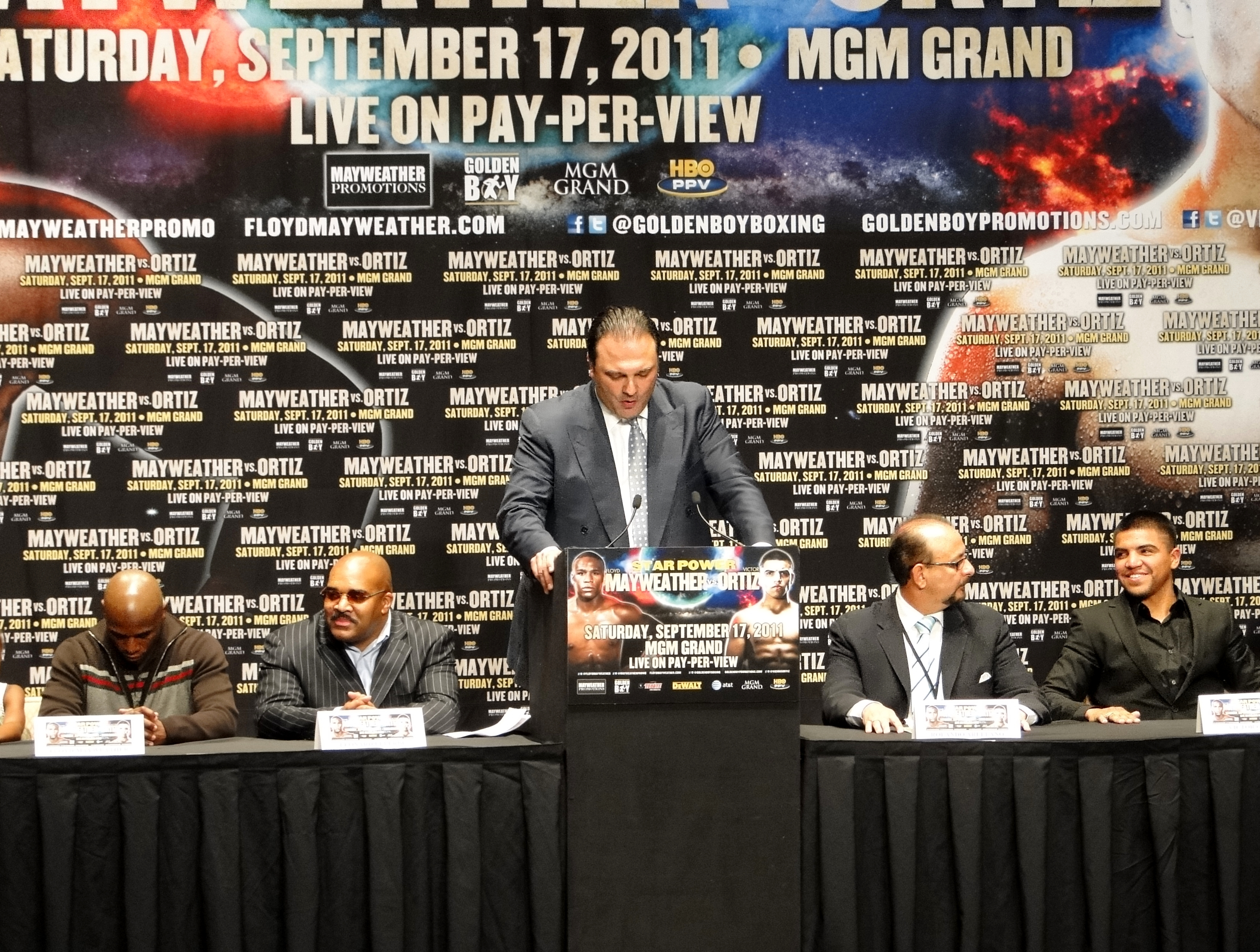
Richard Schaefer making a speech at the 2011 press conference for the fight between Victor Ortiz and Floyd Mayweather, Jr.

Golden Boy promoted the May 5, 2007, "super fight" between De La Hoya and Floyd Mayweather, at the MGM Grand, in Las Vegas, Nevada. Mayweather won the bout by a split decision. The fight once held the records for most pay-per-view buys and as the second-highest grossing fight in the history of the sport. The company also co-promoted, with Top Rank, The Dream Match: Oscar De La Hoya Vs Manny Pacquiao on December 6, 2008.

In June 2009, Golden Boy Enterprises became embroiled in a dispute over who would fight for the WBA junior welterweight title. On the one hand, undefeated Dmitry Salita (the WBA's No. 1-ranked 140-pounder) was told by the WBA in writing that he will face the winner of the June 27 fight between titleholder Andreas Kotelnik and Amir Khan. On the other hand, Richard Schaefer of Golden Boy said that he had it "in writing" that that fight would face the winner of the Victor Ortíz-Marcos Maidana fight. The WBA's top executives were unavailable for comment. Salita was upset over the prospect that he could lose what would be his first title shot. "They're a big company", he said of Golden Boy. "They're trying to bend the rules. They're trying to kick everyone to the side and get their way, rules or no rules. When Oscar De La Hoya formed Golden Boy, he said he wanted to change boxing, to bring honor to the sport. This isn't the honorable thing to do. This isn't good for boxing. This isn't justice. This goes against the right to pursue happiness, which is why my family immigrated to this country (from Ukraine) and why I've worked so hard. We'll see what happens." Salita ended up fighting Khan, losing by 1st-round TKO.

In January 2017, Golden Boy signed a contract to bring their boxing promotions to ESPN under a two-year deal of a total of 48 fights.

In October 2018, Canelo Álvarez (61-2-2, 39 KOs), signed an 11-fight deal with sports streaming site DAZN. The first fight under this new deal was on December 15 of that year, when Álvarez made his first appearance at the historic Madison Square Garden challenging Rocky Fielding (27-1, 15 KOs) for the WBA Super Middleweight World Championship. At the time of signing, Álvarez' deal was the richest athlete contract in sports history.

=== Current title holders ===
Name	Weight Class	Nationality	Notes

Ryan Garcia and William Zepeda are WBC champions under Golden Boy Promotions.

== Notable alumni ==
- Devon Alexander
- Canelo Álvarez
- Mike Anchondo
- Librado Andrade
- Alfredo Angulo
- Manuel Ávila
- Marco Antonio Barrera
- Jorge Barrios
- Yan Bartelemí
- Sharif Bogere
- Francisco Bojado
- Dominic Breazeale
- Adrien Broner
- Nate Campbell
- Joel Casamayor
- Hugo Cázares
- Jermell Charlo
- Luis Collazo
- Juan Díaz
- Billy Dib
- Vicente Escobedo
- Danny García
- Jhonny González
- Robert Guerrero
- Joan Guzmán
- Vivian Harris
- Ricky Hatton
- Mauricio Herrera
- Bernard Hopkins
- Demetrius Hopkins
- Kingsley Ikeke
- Nobuhiro Ishida
- Daniel Jacobs
- Yoshihiro Kamegai
- Michael Katsidis
- Jamie Kavanagh
- Amir Khan
- James Kirkland
- Jeff Lacy
- Erislandy Lara
- Óscar Larios
- Juan Lazcano
- David Lemieux
- Daniel Ponce de León
- Jorge Linares
- Marcos Maidana
- Paulie Malignaggi
- Patricio Manuel
- Abner Mares
- Rafael Márquez
- Lucas Matthysse
- Jorge Meléndez
- Craig McEwan
- Cristian Mijares
- Seth Mitchell
- Carlos Molina
- Fernando Montiel
- Érik Morales
- Sergio Mora
- Eric Morel
- Anselmo Moreno
- Shane Mosley
- Enrique Ornelas
- Victor Ortiz
- Luis Ortiz
- Kassim Ouma
- Manny Pacquiao
- Marco Antonio Peribán
- Lamont Peterson
- Peter Quillin
- David Rodela
- John Ruiz
- José Santa Cruz
- Léo Santa Cruz
- Guillermo Saputo
- Ishe Smith
- Errol Spence
- Humberto Soto
- Keith Thurman
- Austin Trout
- Edwin Valero
- Francisco Vargas
- Israel Vázquez
- Gerald Washington
- Deontay Wilder
- Winky Wright

== Mixed Martial Arts (MMA) promotion ==
In 2018, De La Hoya added mixed martial arts matches to his roster, as Golden Boy MMA, beginning with a 2018 trilogy bout between long-time rivals Chuck Liddell and Tito Ortiz. The inaugural event took place on November 24, 2018 in California, and saw Ortiz dispatch Liddell by first-round knockout.

When the full card was first announced in October 2018, The Ultimate Fighter 3: Team Ortiz vs. Team Shamrock alum Kendall Grove was scheduled to face Andre Walker. However, this bout failed to materialize.

UFC alum Tom Gallicchio was scheduled to face Jason Manly in a Welterweight bout. However, the bout was cancelled when Gallicchio suffered a staph infection.

Kenneth Bergh and Jorge Gonzales were announced to fight in a Light Heavyweight bout. However, the bout failed to materialize. Juliana Miller was initially scheduled to face Jasmine Pouncy. However, Pouncy was replaced by Sidney Trillo.

=== Affliction: Trilogy ===
In 2008, Golden Boy Promotions and Affliction Clothing started a mixed martial arts (MMA) promotion, aggressively pursuing free agents. The promotion was cancelled 10 days prior to its third Affliction: Trilogy PPV event, featuring Fedor Emelianenko and Josh Barnett, in July 2009, subsequent to Barnett having tested positive for anabolic steroids, in accordance with the California State Athletic Commission, when a qualified replacement fighter could not be secured in time.

=== Liddell vs. Ortiz 3 ===
Golden Boy Promotions: Liddell vs. Ortiz 3
- Date: November 24, 2018
- Venue: The Forum
- City: Inglewood, California
- Attendance: 7,839

Golden Boy Promotions: Liddell vs. Ortiz 3 was a MMA event that took place on November 24, 2018 at The Forum in Inglewood, California.

Background

For the main event, Chuck Liddell's reported payout was $250,000 (plus a percentage of pay-per-view buys) and Tito Ortiz's payout was $200,000 (plus a percentage of pay-per-view buys).

Results

Main card
Weight class				Method	Round	Time	Notes
Heavyweight	Tito Ortiz	def.	Chuck Liddell	KO (punch)	1	4:24
Light Heavyweight	Deron Winn	def.	Tom Lawlor	Decision (unanimous) (29-27, 30-27, 30-26)	3	5:00
Catchweight (160 lbs)	Gleison Tibau	def.	Efraín Escudero	Decision (unanimous) (29-28, 29-28, 29-28)	3	5:00
Catchweight (140 lbs)	Ricky Palacios	def.	Walel Watson	TKO (punches and head kick)	1	3:56
Bantamweight	James Barnes	def.	Albert Morales	Submission (armbar)	3	4:09
Heavyweight	Jay Silva	def.	Oscar Ivan Cota	Technical Submission (arm-triangle choke)	3	2:13
Preliminary card (Fite.TV)
Welterweight	Johnny Cisneros	def.	Dave Terrel	Decision (unanimous) (30-26, 30-26, 30-26)	3	5:00
Bantamweight	Fernie Garcia	def.	Joe Roye	Submission (rear-naked choke)	1	2:48
Featherweight	Josh Wang-Kim	def.	Johnny Robles	TKO (punches)	2	1:56
Bantamweight	John Wang-Kim	def.	Mauro Gutierrez	Decision (split) (29-28, 28-29, 29-28)	3	5:00	(Note: Amateur bout)
Women's Strawweight	Julianna Miller	def.	Sidney Trillo	Decision (unanimous) (29-28, 29-28, 29-27)	3	5:00	(Note: Amateur bout)

== See also ==
- Mayweather Promotions
