= Freddie Roach =

American boxer and boxing trainer

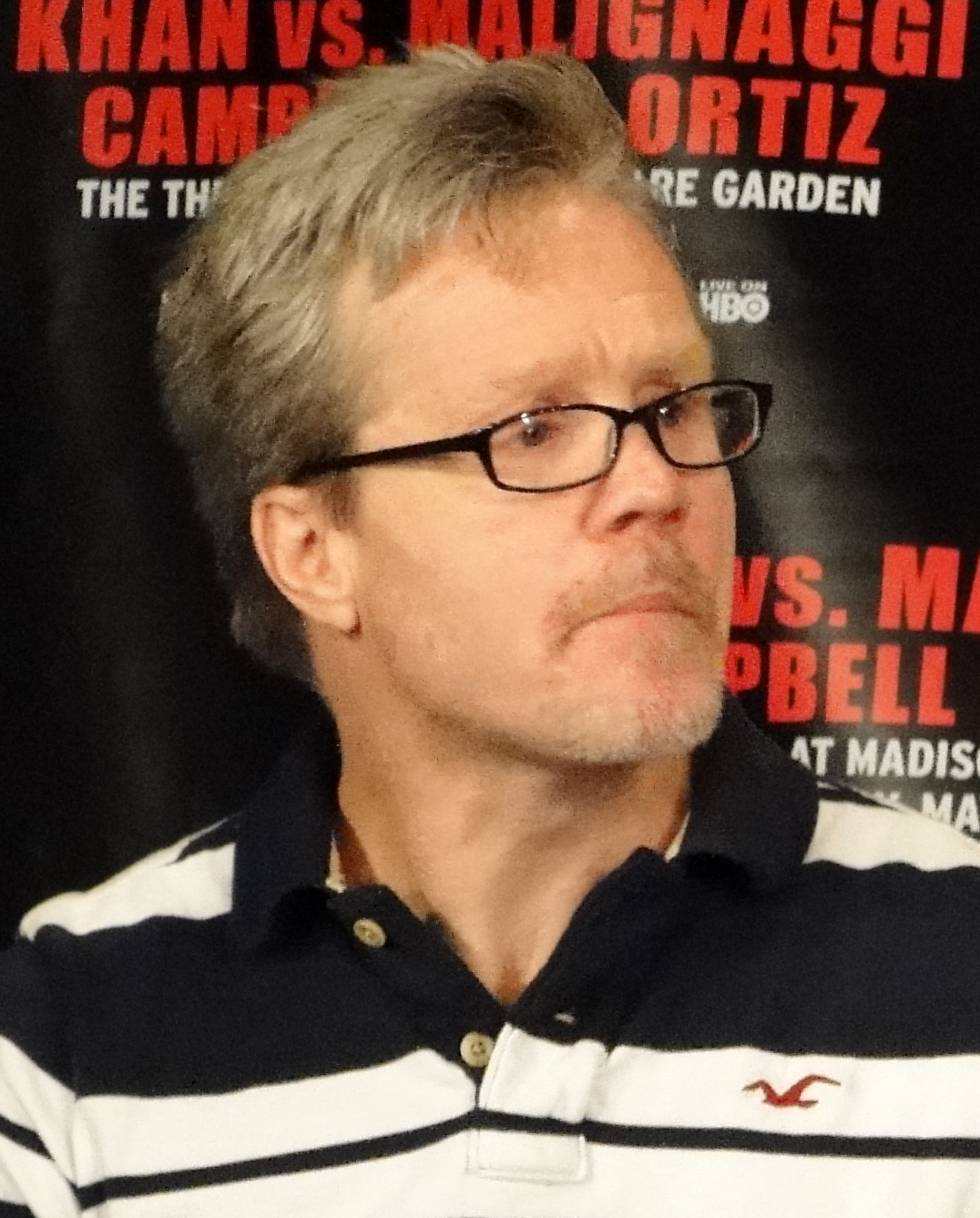
- Roach in 2010

Personal information
- Nicknames: Master Roach; La Cucaracha; The Choir Boy
- Born: March 5, 1960 (age 66) Dedham, Massachusetts, U.S.
- Height: 5 ft 8 in (173 cm)
- Weight: Featherweight; Super featherweight; Lightweight

Boxing career
- Stance: Orthodox

Boxing record
- Total fights: 53
- Wins: 40
- Win by KO: 15
- Losses: 13

Frederick Steven Roach (born March 5, 1960) is an American boxing trainer and former professional boxer. Roach is widely regarded as one of the best boxing trainers of all time. He is the enduring boxing coach of the eight-division world champion Manny Pacquiao, five-time and four-division world champion Miguel Cotto, former WBC middleweight champion Julio César Chávez Jr., three-time world champion James Toney, former UFC middleweight and two-time welterweight champion Georges St-Pierre, as well as top prospects Jose Benavidez, Peter Quillin, and Vanes Martirosyan. Roach was the trainer of two-time women's world champion Lucia Rijker. He has also trained famous Heavyweight champions Mike Tyson and Michael Moorer .

== Early life and boxing career ==
Roach was trained by his father Paul Roach at a young age along with his brothers Joey and Pepper. In an interview with Dan Patrick on the AUDIENCE channel, Roach disclosed that throughout his youth, he was involved in over 300 street fights. Fearing for his own safety in one fight, he claims to have bitten another man's eye out in self-defense.

As a teenager, he was a dominant force in the New England amateur and AAU ranks. Roach turned pro in 1978, fighting as a lightweight and won his first 10 bouts. Roach trained under Eddie Futch and went 26–1 before appearing in a historic match at the Boston Garden on June 11, 1982. The card that night was the first of two times that all three Fighting Roach Brothers appeared at the same time. Brothers Joey and Pepper won their undercard bouts but in the main event, Freddie lost a unanimous decision to Rafael Lopez. Freddie would rebound and go on to contend twice for regional championships.

Late in his career, Roach, who was known for being able to take on a barrage of punches, began showing early signs of Parkinson's disease. Futch asked Roach to retire but the boxer refused and continued to fight with his father as his trainer. He went on to lose five of his last six fights before retiring at age 26. His best payday was $7,500.

== Professional boxing record ==
40 Wins (15 knockouts, 25 decisions), 13 Losses (3 knockouts, 10 decisions), 0 Draws
Res.	Record	Opponent	Type	Rd., Time	Date	Location	Notes
Loss	40–13	David Rivello	MD	10	1986-10-24	Lowell Auditorium, Lowell, Massachusetts, United States	
Win	40–12	Arnel Arrozal	RTD	5 (10)	1986-08-14	Edmonds Community College, Lynnwood, Washington, United States	
Loss	39–12	Andy Nance	KO	10 (10)	1986-04-17	San Rafael, California, United States	
Loss	39–11	Darryl Tyson	UD	12	1986-03-01	Convention Center, Washington, District of Columbia, United States	For WBC Continental Americas Lightweight title.
Loss	39–10	Héctor Camacho	UD	10	1985-12-18	Arco Arena, Sacramento, California, United States	
Loss	39–9	Greg Haugen	TKO	7 (10)	1985-08-22	Showboat Hotel & Casino, Las Vegas, Nevada, United States	
Win	39–8	Joey Olivera	UD	8	1985-06-30	Tropicana Hotel & Casino, Las Vegas, Nevada, United States	
Win	38–8	Martin Morado	TKO	8 (10)	1985-05-23	Marriott Hotel, Irvine, California, United States	
Win	37–8	Jaime Balboa	UD	10	1985-04-09	Sacramento, California, United States	
Loss	36–8	Bobby Chacon	MD	10	1985-03-05	Memorial Auditorium, Sacramento, California, United States	
Loss	36–7	Efrain Nieves	UD	10	1984-12-20	Showboat Hotel & Casino, Las Vegas, Nevada, United States	
Win	36–6	Richie Foster	TKO	8 (10)	1984-10-11	Showboat Hotel & Casino, Las Vegas, Nevada, United States	
Win	35–6	Joe Ruelaz	TKO	4 (10)	1984-08-09	Showboat Hotel & Casino, Las Vegas, Nevada, United States	
Loss	34–6	Tommy Cordova	SD	12	1984-06-12	Showboat Hotel & Casino, Las Vegas, Nevada, United States	For ESPN Super Featherweight title.
Win	34–5	Efrain Nieves	TD	8 (?)	1984-04-12	Portland, Oregon, United States	
Win	33–5	Delio Palacios	UD	10	1984-03-21	Gilley's Club / Rodeo Arena, Pasadena, Texas, United States	
Loss	32–5	Louis Burke	UD	10	1983-11-10	Caesars Palace, Las Vegas, Nevada, United States	
Win	32–4	Carlos Bryant	UD	10	1983-08-25	Showboat Hotel & Casino, Las Vegas, Nevada, United States	
Win	31–4	Reynaldo Zaragoza	KO	8 (10)	1983-06-30	Las Vegas, Nevada, United States	
Loss	30–4	Louis Burke	UD	12	1983-04-14	Showboat Hotel & Casino, Las Vegas, Nevada, United States	For ESPN Super Featherweight title.
Win	30–3	Bobby Pappion	TKO	9 (10)	1983-02-07	Las Vegas, Nevada, United States	
Win	29–3	Danny Cruz	UD	10	1982-12-23	Las Vegas, Nevada, United States	
Win	28–3	Danny Cruz	SD	10	1982-11-25	Las Vegas, Nevada, United States	
Win	27–3	Martin Galvan	UD	10	1982-09-23	Las Vegas, Nevada, United States	
Loss	26–3	Lenny Valdez	TKO	2 (10)	1982-07-01	Las Vegas, Nevada, United States	
Loss	26–2	Rafael Lopez	SD	10	1982-06-11	Boston Garden, Boston, Massachusetts, United States	
Win	26–1	Juan Veloz	UD	10	1982-04-17	Showboat Hotel & Casino, Las Vegas, Nevada, United States	
Win	25–1	Herman Ingram	UD	8	1981-12-26	Ballys Park Place Hotel Casino, Atlantic City, New Jersey, United States	
Win	24–1	Mario Chavez	SD	10	1981-05-28	Hacienda Hotel, Las Vegas, Nevada, United States	
Win	23–1	Jose Resendez	PTS	10	1981-03-26	Las Vegas, Nevada, United States	
Win	22–1	Javier Flores	TKO	8 (10)	1981-02-23	Caesar's Hotel & Casino, Atlantic City, New Jersey, United States	
Win	21–1	David Capo	UD	10	1981-02-12	Boston, Massachusetts, United States	
Win	20–1	Joe Phillips	UD	10	1981-01-17	Boston Garden, Boston, Massachusetts, United States	Won vacant USA New England Featherweight title.
Win	19–1	Jose Resendez	UD	8	1980-11-01	Caesars Tahoe, Stateline, Nevada, United States	
Win	18–1	Pedro Gonzalez	KO	4	1980-10-09	Phoenix, Arizona, United States	
Win	17–1	Jose Resendez	UD	10	1980-08-27	Silver Slipper, Las Vegas, Nevada, United States	
Win	16–1	Manuel Martinez	KO	3	1980-07-11	Phoenix, Arizona, United States	
Win	15–1	Lionel Harney	KO	6 (10)	1980-04-16	Silver Slipper, Las Vegas, Nevada, United States	
Win	14–1	Billy Martinez	KO	2	1980-04-02	Silver Slipper, Las Vegas, Nevada, United States	
Win	13–1	Roberto Flores	KO	1 (6)	1980-01-23	Silver Slipper, Las Vegas, Nevada, United States	
Win	12–1	Luis Avila	PTS	6	1979-12-12	Silver Slipper, Las Vegas, Nevada, United States	
Win	11–1	Ruben Moreno	UD	6	1979-10-24	Silver Slipper, Las Vegas, Nevada, United States	
Loss	10–1	Beto Nunez	PTS	6	1979-09-13	Phoenix, Arizona, United States	
Win	10–0	Francisco Pico	UD	6	1979-08-29	Silver Slipper, Las Vegas, Nevada, United States	
Win	9–0	Desi Newbill	UD	6	1979-08-10	Coliseum, San Diego, California, United States	
Win	8–0	Ricardo Hurtado	KO	1	1979-08-02	Phoenix, Arizona, United States	
Win	7–0	Adolfo Hurtado	UD	6	1979-07-25	Silver Slipper, Las Vegas, Nevada, United States	
Win	6–0	John Papin	UD	6	1979-06-27	Silver Slipper, Las Vegas, Nevada, United States	
Win	5–0	Ney Santiago	TKO	6 (6)	1979-06-06	Las Vegas, Nevada, United States	
Win	4–0	Eddie Bracetty	PTS	6	1979-02-03	Boston Garden, Boston, Massachusetts, United States	
Win	3–0	Eddie Bracetty	PTS	6	1978-12-21	Portland, Maine, United States	
Win	2–0	Jose Maldonado	KO	6	1978-09-16	Yarmouth, Massachusetts, United States	
Win	1–0	Roberto Vasquez	PTS	6	1978-08-24	Boston Garden, Boston, Massachusetts, United States	

== Boxing trainer ==
Roach has trained 40 world champions to date. After his retirement from fighting, Roach worked in a variety of jobs around Las Vegas including telemarketing and a busboy before taking a job with his former trainer and mentor Eddie Futch as an unpaid assistant in 1986. He excelled in his new position and worked as Futch's assistant for five years.

In 1991, actor Mickey Rourke returned to boxing midway through his acting career, and hired Roach to train him in Hollywood, California. In 1995, when Rourke decided to quit boxing, he gave gym equipment to Roach, and it can be found in the Wild Card Boxing Club on Vine Street.

Roach owns the Wild Card Boxing Club in Los Angeles and works alongside his brother Pepper. Roach's most notable trainee is eight-division world champion Manny Pacquiao. Roach also once trained Oscar De La Hoya for his May 5, 2007 superfight against Floyd Mayweather Jr. His first world champion was Virgil Hill, whom he took over from his own former trainer, Eddie Futch. He is also the former trainer for British boxers Gary Stretch (former WBC light middleweight champion), training Stretch for his WBO middleweight title challenge against Chris Eubank, and Amir Khan, who became the WBA light welterweight champion on July 18, 2009, and the IBF light welterweight champion on July 23, 2011, under Roach's tutelage. Roach also trains welterweight boxer Zachary "Kid Yamaka" Wohlman among many others. Roach has trained 27 world champions to date and can usually be seen nearby when his boxers are interviewed.

In the world of mixed martial arts (MMA), Roach has trained former UFC heavyweight champion Andrei Arlovski and was one of his primary trainers for Arlovski's victory over Ben Rothwell on July 19 at Affliction's inaugural show. He has also trained MMA fighter Dan Hardy for his fight with Marcus Davis at UFC 99 as well as MMA greats, Tito Ortiz, Anderson Silva, and B.J. Penn. In May 2010, he began a training engagement with Georges St-Pierre in advance preparation for the fighter's successful UFC welterweight title defense against Josh Koscheck at UFC 124. Roach has also trained many other prominent mixed martial artists, such as: pro-boxer and kickboxer, and former EliteXC lightweight champion, K. J. Noons, Roger Huerta, and Rameau Thierry Sokoudjou. In March 2010, Roach expressed interest in wanting to train former Pride FC and WAMMA heavyweight champion, Fedor Emelianenko.

== Parkinson's disease ==
Roach has Parkinson's disease. As chronicled in the HBO series Real Sports with Bryant Gumbel, he is able to actively control the disease through medication, injections, and his training of boxers. Roach's doctors feel that his active in-ring training routines with his fighters and tremendous eye-hand coordination that he has to exhibit have made it possible to slow the progress of the disease.

== Honors ==
- Inducted into the World Boxing Hall of Fame, "Expanded Category" (Managers & Trainers).
- 2006 California Boxing Hall of Fame Inductee (Non-Boxer)
- 2003, 2006, 2008, 2009, 2010, 2013 & 2014 Boxing Writers Association of America Trainer of the Year
- 2008 World Boxing Council (WBC) "Lifetime Achievement Award"
- 2012 International Boxing Hall of Fame, Canastota, New York, United States Non-participant Inductee (Trainer of World Champions)
- 2013 Nevada Boxing Hall of Fame Inaugural Inductee ("Trainers" Category)
- 2021 USA Boxing Hall of Fame - Fighter, Trainer, Manager

== Notable boxers trained ==
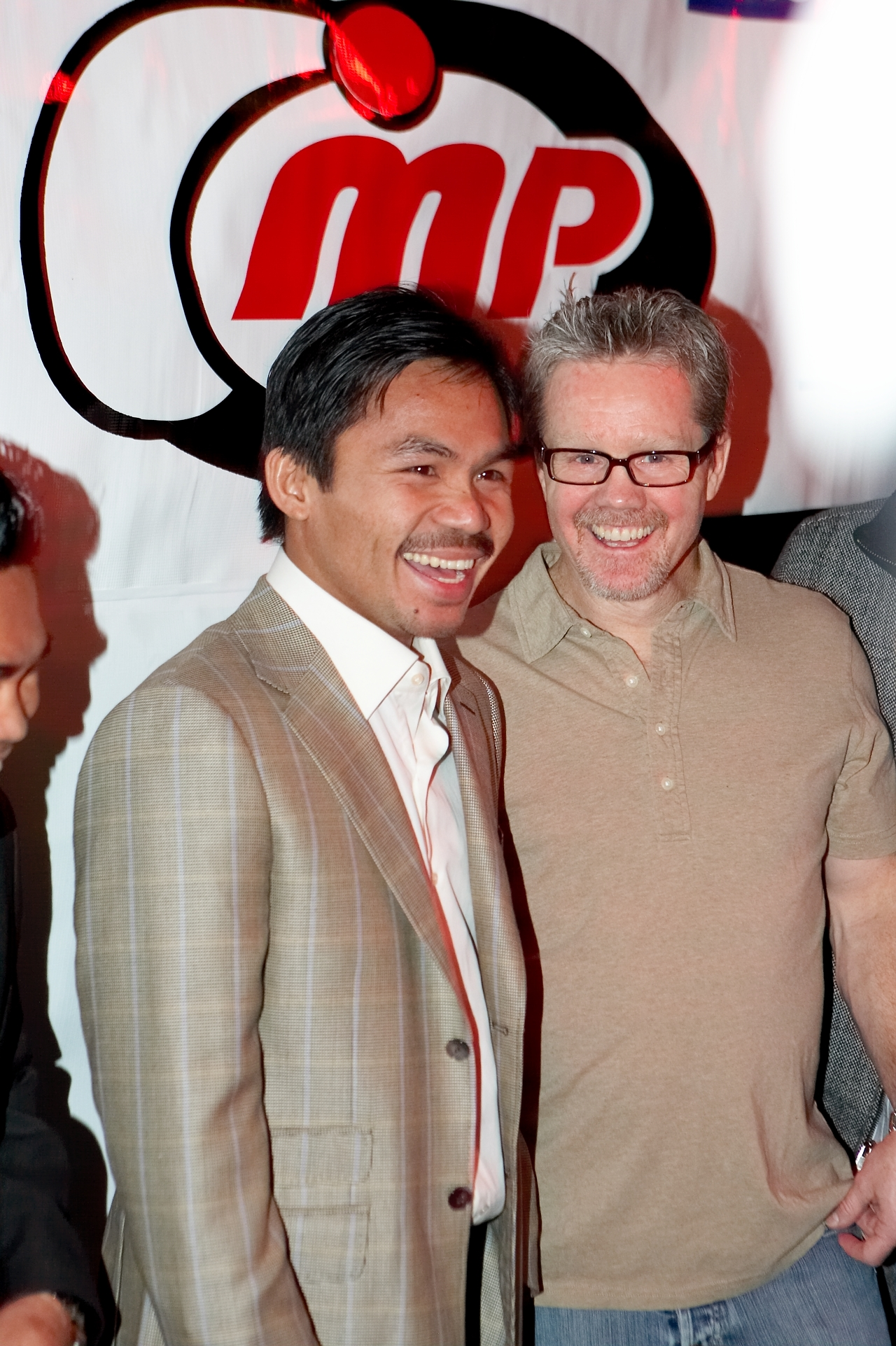
Freddie Roach (right) and Manny Pacquiao (left) at Los Angeles, California in 2008.

- (Philippines) Manny Pacquiao - eight-division world champion; International Boxing Hall of Fame inductee. (Roach’s most famous trainee and long‑time partner. Became one of the most successful fighter‑trainer duos in boxing history.)
- (United States) Virgil Hill - three-division world champion; International Boxing Hall of Fame inductee. (Roach’s first world champion in 1987. Hill’s success helped establish Roach’s reputation as an elite trainer.)
- (United States) Johnny Tapia - three-division champion; International Boxing Hall of Fame inductee. (Trained and guided Tapia during later stages of his career.)
- (United States) James Toney - two-division world champion; International Boxing Hall of Fame inductee.
- (United States) Michael Moorer - two-division world champion; International Boxing Hall of Fame inductee.
- (United States) Mike Tyson - undisputed world heavyweight champion; International Boxing Hall of Fame inductee. (Worked with Tyson during his comeback attempts in the mid‑2000s.)
- (United States) Bernard Hopkins - two-division world champion; undisputed world Middleweight champion; International Boxing Hall of Fame inductee. (Advisory/training collaboration.)
- (United States) Oscar De La Hoya - six-division world champion; International Boxing Hall of Fame inductee. (Trained only once for the De La Hoya–Mayweather Jr. bout in 2007.)
- (Puerto Rico) Miguel Cotto - four-division world champion; International Boxing Hall of Fame inductee.
- (Ukraine) Wladimir Klitschko - heavyweight world champion; International Boxing Hall of Fame inductee. (As a former assistant trainer.)
- (Mexico) Julio César Chávez Jr. - middleweight world champion
- (Mexico) Andy Ruiz Jr. - heavyweight world champion
- (Cuba) Guillermo Rigondeaux - super-bantamweight world champion
- (United Kingdom) Amir Khan - light-welterweight world champion
- (Russia) Ruslan Provodnikov - light-welterweight world champion
- (United States) Brian Viloria - two-division world champion
- (Ukraine) Viktor Postol - light-welterweight world champion
- (Japan) Hozumi Hasegawa - three-division world champion
- (United States) José Ramírez - light-welterweight world champion
- (Venezuela) Jorge Linares - three-division world champion
- (Philippines) Gerry Peñalosa - bantamweight world champion
- (United States) Daniel Jacobs - middleweight world champion
- (Puerto Rico) Ángel Acosta - light-flyweight world champion
- (China) Zou Shiming - flyweight world champion
- (Canada) Jean Pascal - two-division world champion
- (United Kingdom) Scott Quigg - super-bantamweight world champion
- (Mexico) Israel Vázquez - super-bantamweight world champion
- (United States) Ana Julaton - super-bantamweight world champion (Female boxer trained by Roach.).
- (Philippines) Mark Magsayo - featherweight world champion

== In popular culture ==
Roach has trained men who are not professional boxers for roles in TV and film.

Name	Occupation	Trained for	Duration	Notes
(United States) Shaquille O'Neal	NBA player	Shaq Vs.	2 Episodes	Trainer for Shaquille O'Neal for both Oscar De La Hoya and Shane Mosley matches
(United States) Mark Wahlberg	Actor	The Fighter	-	Trainer for Mark Wahlberg

== Notable mixed martial artists trained ==
=== Key ===
^{−}	Former world champions
*	Current world champions

Nationality	Name	Weight Class	Notes
(United States) American	Aaron Pico	Featherweight	
(Brazil) Brazilian	^{−}Anderson Silva	Middleweight	
(Belarus) Belarusian	^{−}Andrei Arlovski	Heavyweight	
(United States) American	^{−}Ben Askren	Welterweight	
(United States) American	^{−}B.J. Penn	Lightweight	
(Japan) Japanese	^{−}Caol Uno	Lightweight	
(England) English	Dan Hardy	Welterweight	
(United States) American	^{−}Frank Mir	Heavyweight	
(Netherlands) Dutch	^{−}Gegard Mousasi	Middleweight	
(Brazil) Brazilian	^{−}José Aldo	Featherweight	
(United States) American	^{−}K. J. Noons	Lightweight	
(United States) American	Mark Muñoz	Middleweight	
(United States) American	^{−}Tony Ferguson	Lightweight	
(United States) American	Diego Sanchez	Lightweight	
(Brazil) Brazilian	^{−}Maurício Rua	Light heavyweight	
(Cameroon) Cameroonian	Rameau Thierry Sokoudjou	Light Heavyweight	
(United States) American	Roger Huerta	Lightweight	
(United States) American	^{−}Tito Ortiz	Light heavyweight	
(Canada) Canadian	^{−}Georges St-Pierre	Middleweight	
