= Roberto Durán vs. Héctor Camacho II =

Boxing match

Legends Collide
- Date: July 14, 2001
- Venue: Pepsi Center, Denver, Colorado, U.S.
- Title(s) on the line: NBA super middleweight title

Tale of the tape
Boxer	Roberto Durán	Héctor Camacho
Nickname	Manos de Piedra ("Hands of Stone")	Macho
Hometown	Panama City, Panama	Bayamón, Puerto Rico
Pre-fight record	103–15 (70 KO)	73–4–2 (35 KO)
Age	50 years	39 years, 1 month
Height	5 ft 7 1/2 in (171 cm)	5 ft 6 1/2 in (169 cm)
Weight	162 lb (73 kg)	159 lb (72 kg)
Style	Orthodox	Southpaw
Recognition	NBA super middleweight champion 4-division world champion	3-division world champion

Result
- Camacho wins via UD (118–108, 118–108, 114–112)

Roberto Durán vs. Héctor Camacho II, billed as Legends Collide, was a professional boxing match contested on July 14, 2001, for the NBA super middleweight title. This was the 119th and final professional fight of Durán's career.

== Background ==
Five years after their previous fight, Héctor Camacho and Roberto Durán agreed to a rematch to take place in July 2001 in the Pepsi Center in Denver, Colorado. The 39-year old Camacho sported a 73–4–2 record but had not fought for a major world title since his 1997 loss to Oscar De La Hoya. Durán, meanwhile, came into the fight at 103–15 but had found himself suspended by the Nevada State Athletic Commission following a blowout loss to WBA middleweight champion William Joppy in 1998. Though he flirted with retirement after the Joppy fight, Durán continued to fight, and unable to fight in United States due to his suspension, fought twice in Latin America before being reinstated by the Nevada State Athletic Commission in August 2000 after passing a neurological examination.

Much like prior to their first encounter, Durán had little praise for the flamboyant Camacho stating "This guy is a clown, he's no legend. There's only one legend. That's me." Likewise, Camacho was confident he would again defeat his senior opponent saying "Being at 50 years old, he wants to go on and do miracles. He ain't done miracles before. He sure ain't going to do miracles now. He's going to come in there trying to do the impossible, and I'm ready for the impossible" and "I haven't been worried about the idea of losing to Roberto Duran, not at this stage. If I lose to this guy, I might as well retire." Unlike their previous fight, which was held in the middleweight division, this fight was in the super middleweight division with Duran's fringe NBA super middleweight title on the line. As the smaller Camacho had no experience in the division, the fighters agreed to a 163-pound catchweight

The venue for the fight was the 19,000-seat Pepsi Center, a sizeable increase from the Etess Arena which seated only around 5,000. Ticket sales were slow and only 3,000 tickets had been sold the day before the event, though around 6,597 were in attendance come the night of the fight.

== The fight ==
In contrast to their relatively close first fight, Camacho controlled the fight, easily outboxing the aging Durán, who had a hard time landing punches and seemed to tire early in the fight. The fight went the full 12 rounds with Camacho securing a lopsided unanimous decision with two scores of 118-108 and one score of 114–112.

== Aftermath ==
Durán blamed his poor performance on the high altitude claiming "It got to me in the fifth round."

== Fight card ==
Confirmed bouts:

Weight Class	Weight		vs.		Method	Round	Notes
Super Middleweight	162 lbs.	Héctor Camacho	def.	Roberto Durán	UD	12/12	^{Note 1}
Super Welterweight	154 lbs.	Oba Carr	def.	Norberto Sandoval	UD	10/10
Welterweight	147 lbs.	Demetrius Hopkins	def.	Rashaan Abdul Blackburn	TKO	3/8
Cruiserweight	190 lbs.	Kelvin Davis	def.	Derek Amos	TKO	1/8

^Note 1 For NBA Super Middleweight title

Preceded by vs. Patrick Goossen	Roberto Durán's bouts 14 July 2001	Retired
Preceded by vs. Troy Lowry	Héctor Camacho's bouts 14 July 2001	Succeeded by vs. Otilio Villarreal
