= Mike Arnaoutis =

Greek boxer

Personal information
- Nickname: Mighty Mike
- Born: Michalis John Arnaoutis Zefyri, Athens, Greece
- Weight: Light welterweight; Welterweight

Boxing career
- Stance: Southpaw

Boxing record
- Total fights: 40
- Wins: 26
- Win by KO: 13
- Losses: 12
- Draws: 2
Medal record
Men's amateur boxing
European Youth Championships
Gold medal – first place	1998 Minsk	Featherweight
Acropolis Boxing Cup
Gold medal – first place	2001 Athens	light welterweight
Greek National Championships
Gold medal – first place	1999 Athens	Featherweight
Silver medal – second place	2000 Piraeus	Featherweight

Michalis John Arnaoutis (born 6 September 1979) is a Greek professional boxer who challenged for the WBO light welterweight title in 2006. At regional level he held the WBO-NABO light welterweight title from 2004 to 2006 and the IBF-USBA light welterweight title from 2008 to 2009.

== Amateur career ==
He started his involvement with the sport at the age of 12 in AEK and from the first day he loved it and devoted himself to it. As an amateur, he won many distinctions. He was the champion of Greece for many years among children, teenagers and men at 57 kg. He has won the Pan-European junior medal, 1st place in the Acropolis Cup, and many other distinctions. He was a member of the national team for 6 years, from 1994 to 2000.

== Professional career ==
In 2001, at the age of 22, he leaves for the USA to realize his biggest dream, to become a professional boxer and conquer the top. Having 10 years of hard work and training in America, his career reached its absolute zenith, winning World Titles. He holds the WBO – NABO and IBF – NSBA World Titles. In 2004 he was voted the most televised boxer by the ShowBox channel. In 2005 he made the best knock out, recognizing it and the ESPN channel. In addition, he was voted the best left-hander in the world by the professional boxing committee statistical service in the United States.

== Professional boxing record ==
40 fights	26 wins	12 losses
By knockout	13	3
By decision	13	9
Draws	2	

No.	Result	Record	Opponent	Type	Round, time	Date	Location	Notes
40	Loss	26 - 12 - 2	(United States) Thomas Lamanna	UD	8 (8)	2018-11-16	(United States) Showboat Atlantic City, Atlantic City	vacant USA New Jersey State Welter Title
39	Loss	26 - 11 - 2	(United States) Jaron Ennis	TKO	2 (10)	2018-06-01	(United States) Showboat Atlantic City, Atlantic City	
38	Win	26 - 10 - 2	(Russia) Mikhail Avakian	KO	5 (10)	2016-03-19	Athens, Greece	
37	Win	25 - 10 - 2	(Belarus) Andrei Staliarchuk	KO	2 (10)	2014-05-04	Patras, Greece	
36	Loss	24 - 10 - 2	(United States) Josesito López	TD	8 (10)	2013-12-13	(United States) Fantasy Springs Resort Casino, Indio	
35	Loss	24 - 9 - 2	(United States) Chris Algieri	UD	10 (10)	2013-07-20	(United States) Paramount Theatre, Huntington	
34	Loss	24 - 8 - 2	(United States) Issouf Kinda	UD	10 (10)	2012-10-13	(United States) Theatre at Westbury, Westbury	USA New York State Super light Title
33	Win	24 - 7 - 2	(United States) Broderick Antoine	TKO	7 (8)	2012-05-02	(United States) Russo's on the bay, Howard Beach, Queens	
32	Win	23 - 7 - 2	(United States) Shakha Moore	UD	6 (6)	2012-02-10	(United States) Mohegan Sun Casino Arena, Uncasville	
31	Loss	22 - 7 - 2	(United States) Danny García	KO	4 (10)	2010-10-08	(United States) South Philly Arena, Philadelphia	
30	Loss	22 - 6 - 2	(United States) Demetrius Hopkins	UD	10 (10)	2010-07-02	(United States) Citizens Business Bank Arena, Ontario	
29	Loss	22 - 5 - 2	(Dominican Republic) Delvin Rodríguez	UD	12 (12)	2010-04-02	(United States) Mohegan Sun Casino Arena, Uncasville	USBA Welterweight
28	Loss	22 - 4 - 2	(United States) Tim Coleman	SD	12 (12)	2009-12-03	(United States) Manhattan Center Grand Ballroom, New York	vacant IBF-USBA Super Light Title
27	Win	22 - 3 - 2	(United States) Doel Carrasquillo	UD	10 (10)	2009-06-25	(United States) Schuetzen Park, North Bergen	
26	Loss	21 - 3 - 2	(United States) Victor Ortiz	TKO	2 (12)	2009-03-07	(United States) HP Pavilion, San Jose	WBO NABO Super Light Title IBF-USBA Super Light Title
25	Win	21 - 2 - 2	(Ghana) Benjamin Ankrah	UD	10 (10)	2008-10-29	(United States) Roseland Ballroom, New York	
24	Win	20 - 2 - 2	(Kenya) Nasser Athumani	KO	3 (10)	2008-09-05	(United States) Bally's Event Center, Atlantic Center	
23	Win	19 - 2 - 2	(United States) Lanardo Tyner	UD	12 (12)	2008-05-09	(United States) Bally's Park Place, Atlantic Center	IBF-USBA Super Light Title
22	Win	18 - 2 - 2	(Dominican Republic) Harrison Cuello	UD	12 (12)	2008-03-06	(United States) Grand Ballroom, New York	vacant IBF-USBA Super Light Title
21	Loss	17 - 2 - 2	(United States) Kendall Holt	UD	12 (12)	2007-04-20	(United States) Bally's Event Center, Atlantic Center	WBO Welterweight Light Title Eliminator
20	Loss	17 - 1 - 2	(Colombia) Ricardo Torres	SD	12 (12)	2006-11-18	(United States) Thomas and Mack Arena, Las Vegas	vacant WBO NABO Super Light Title vacant WBO Light Welterweight title
19	Win	17 - 0 - 2	(United States) Mike Walker	KO	1 (8)	2006-04-07	(United States) Florida State Fairgrounds, Tampa	
18	Win	16 - 0 - 2	(United States) Marc Thompson	TKO	1 (12)	2006-01-27	(United States) Tropicana Hotel & Casino, Atlantic City	WBO NABO Super Light Title
17	Win	15 - 0 - 2	(United States) Jose Leo Moreno	KO	1 (12)	2005-12-09	(United States) Kissimmee Civic Center, Kissimmee	WBO NABO Super Light Title
16	Win	14 - 0 - 2	(United States) Marteze Logan	UD	10 (10)	2005-09-02	(United States) Gold Coast Hotel and Casino, Las Vegas	
15	Win	13 - 0 - 2	(Mexico) Roberto Santa Cruz	MD	12 (12)	2005-02-18	(United States) Chumash Casino Resort, Santa Ynez	WBO NABO Super Light Title
14	Win	12 - 0 - 2	(United States) Juaquin Gallardo	TKO	3 (10)	2004-12-17	(United States) Chumash Casino Resort, Santa Ynez	WBO NABO Super Light Title
13	Win	11 - 0 - 2	(United States) Jesse Feliciano	TKO	1 (12)	2004-10-22	(United States) Chumash Casino Resort, Santa Ynez	vacant WBO NABO Super Light Title
12	Draw	10 - 0 - 2	(Colombia) Juan Urango	MD	12 (12)	2004-08-05	(United States) Seminole Hard Rock Hotel & Casino, Hollywood	WBO NABO Super Light Title
11	Win	10 - 0 - 1	(United States) Marty Robbins	UD	6 (6)	2004-06-17	(United States) Michael's Eighth Avenue, Glen Burnie	
10	Win	9 - 0 - 1	(United States) Hector Saez	UD	6 (6)	2004-05-06	(United States) Michael's Eighth Avenue, Glen Burnie	
9	Win	8 - 0 - 1	(Colombia) Juan Polo Perez	MD	6 (6)	2004-04-08	(United States) Wyndham Inner Harbor Hotel, Glen Burnie	
8	Draw	7 - 0 - 1	(Indonesia) Ibrahim Aroby	TD	6 (8)	2003-08-15	(Indonesia) Indosiar Studio, Jakarta	
7	Win	7 - 0	(United States) Arnold Henderson	UD	6 (6)	2002-08-24	(United States) Resorts Hotel and Casino, Atlantic City	
6	Win	6 - 0	(United States) Waklimi Young	KO	1 (6)	2002-05-17	(United States) Spectrum (arena), Philadelphia	
5	Win	5 - 0	(United States) Rafael Rodriguez	TKO	3 (6)	2002-03-23	(United States) Adelphia Restaurant, Deptford	
4	Win	4 - 0	(United States) Lamont Gorum	TKO	1 (4)	2002-02-06	(United States) Yonkers Raceway & Empire City Casino, Yonkers	
3	Win	3 - 0	(United States) Leroy Price	TKO	3 (4)	2001-12-14	(United States) Sands Hotel and Casino, Atlantic City	
2	Win	2 - 0	(United States) Mike Hamon	DQ	3 (4)	2001-11-30	(United States) The Bellevue-Stratford Hotel, Philadelphia	
1	Win	1 - 0	(Russia) Sergey Dolmatov	PTS	4 (4)	2001-04-30	(Ukraine) Kyiv, Circus	Professional debut
