= Ricardo Torres (boxer) =

Colombian boxer (born 1980)

Personal information
- Nickname: Mochuelo (Owl)
- Born: Ricardo Antonio Torres Tafur; 16 February 1980 (age 46) Magangué, Colombia
- Height: 5 ft 8 in (173 cm)
- Weight: Light welterweight

Boxing career
- Reach: 67 in (170 cm)
- Stance: Orthodox

Boxing record
- Total fights: 36
- Wins: 33
- Win by KO: 29
- Losses: 3

Ricardo Antonio Torres Tafur (born February 16, 1980) is a Colombian former professional boxer. He was managed by Billy Chams, owner of the Barranquilla-based firm Cuadrilátero. His brother, Jose Miguel Torres, is also a professional boxer.

During his childhood, Torres wanted to be a professional soccer player, but his father, who practiced boxing in the seventies, encouraged Ricardo to switch gears and concentrate on boxing.

== Professional career ==
Torres began boxing professionally in 2001 and had a torrid streak of 28 consecutive victories with 26 KO's before losing by KO in a vicious battle with Miguel Angel Cotto for the WBO light-welterweight title. Torres had Cotto knocked down once during the fight. After the loss to Cotto, he took on Mike Arnaoutis for the same WBO Light Welterweight title vacated by Cotto and won the belt with a narrow split decision. He would lose the belt to American contender Kendall Holt.

== Professional boxing record ==
36 fights	33 wins	3 losses
By knockout	29	3
By decision	4	0

No.	Result	Record	Opponent	Type	Round, time	Date	Location	Notes
36	Loss	33–3	Juan Narvaez	KO	3 (8)	2023-12-22	Restaurante Bar Don Juan, Carmen de Apicalá, Colombia	
35	Win	33–2	Raúl Pinzón	TKO	10 (10)	2009-05-15	Hotel Prado Mar, Puerto Colombia, Colombia	
34	Loss	32–2	Kendall Holt	KO	1 (12)	2008-07-05	Planet Hollywood Las Vegas, Paradise, Nevada, U.S.	Lost WBO light-welterweight title
33	Win	32–1	Kendall Holt	TKO	11 (12)	2007-09-01	Salón Jumbo Country Club, Barranquilla, Colombia	Retained WBO light-welterweight title
32	Win	31–1	Arturo Morua	UD	12 (12)	2007-04-28	Coliseo Universidad del Norte, Barranquilla, Colombia	Retained WBO light-welterweight title
31	Win	30–1	Mike Arnaoutis	SD	12 (12)	2006-11-18	Thomas & Mack Center, Paradise, Nevada, U.S.	Won vacant WBO light-welterweight title
30	Win	29–1	Carlos Donquiz	KO	2 (10)	2006-06-30	Coliseo Elias Chegwin, Barranquilla, Colombia	
29	Loss	28–1	Miguel Cotto	KO	7 (12)	2005-09-24	Boardwalk Hall, Atlantic City, New Jersey, U.S.	For WBO light-welterweight title
28	Win	28–0	Edwin Vazquez	TKO	3 (10)	2005-08-05	Coliseo Pedrin Zorrilla, San Juan, Puerto Rico	
27	Win	27–0	Ulises Villalobos	TKO	2 (10)	2005-06-11	Coliseo Elias Chegwin, Barranquilla, Colombia	
26	Win	26–0	Reynaldo Esquivia	KO	1 (10)	2005-03-18	Gimnasio Chico de Hierro, Cartagena, Colombia	
25	Win	25–0	Ignacio Solar	KO	5 (10)	2004-10-29	Coliseo Elias Chegwin, Barranquilla, Colombia	
24	Win	24–0	Luis Cardozo	KO	1 (?)	2004-06-14	Colombia	
23	Win	23–0	Reynaldo Duran	KO	1 (4)	2004-05-07	Barranquilla, Colombia	
22	Win	22–0	Facundo David Tolosa	UD	10 (10)	2003-09-27	Salón Jumbo Country Club, Barranquilla, Colombia	
21	Win	21–0	Placido Coneo	RTD	2 (10)	2003-08-22	Coliseo Elias Chegwin, Barranquilla, Colombia	
20	Win	20–0	Eliseo Ferias	KO	2 (?)	2003-08-09	Cartagena, Colombia	
19	Win	19–0	Manuel Dominguez	KO	3 (?)	2003-07-16	Colombia	
18	Win	18–0	Gilberto Mena	KO	4 (10)	2003-06-14	Barranquilla, Colombia	
17	Win	17–0	Emilio Julio	TKO	3 (10)	2003-04-25	Coliseo Elias Chegwin, Barranquilla, Colombia	
16	Win	16–0	Feder Guerrero	KO	3 (8)	2003-04-04	Coliseo Elias Chegwin, Barranquilla, Colombia	
15	Win	15–0	Reynaldo Duran	KO	4 (?)	2003-03-14	Centro de Convenciones, Cartagena, Colombia	
14	Win	14–0	Raul Barrios	KO	5 (10)	2002-12-13	Coliseo Elias Chegwin, Barranquilla, Colombia	
13	Win	13–0	Pedro Julio	KO	1 (8)	2002-11-01	Polideportivo San Felipe, Barranquilla, Colombia	
12	Win	12–0	Orlando Solano	KO	1 (6)	2002-09-14	Hilton Hotel, Cartagena, Colombia	
11	Win	11–0	Humberto Herrera	TKO	6 (?)	2002-08-16	Barranquilla, Colombia	
10	Win	10–0	Reynaldo Duran	KO	1 (4)	2002-07-16	Barranquilla, Colombia	
9	Win	9–0	Manuel Dominguez	KO	2 (4)	2002-06-29	Colombia	
8	Win	8–0	Juan Nieto	KO	2 (?)	2002-04-26	Barranquilla, Colombia	
7	Win	7–0	Elias Ruiz	PTS	6 (6)	2002-03-30	Cartagena, Colombia	
6	Win	6–0	Raul Barrios	KO	1 (6)	2002-01-31	Magangué, Colombia	
5	Win	5–0	Eliseo Ferias	KO	1 (?)	2002-01-19	Cartagena, Colombia	
4	Win	4–0	Ramon Otero	KO	2 (4)	2001-12-22	Canalete, Colombia	
3	Win	3–0	Dario Ramos	KO	1 (4)	2001-12-14	Cartagena, Colombia	
2	Win	2–0	Juan Villadiego	KO	1 (?)	2001-06-23	Magangué, Colombia	
1	Win	1–0	Ramon Otero	KO	1 (4)	2001-03-30	Barranquilla, Colombia	

== See also ==
- List of world light-welterweight boxing champions

Sporting positions
World boxing titles
Vacant Title last held by Miguel Cotto	WBO light-welterweight champion November 18, 2006 – July 5, 2008	Succeeded by Kendall Holt
