= Oscar De La Hoya vs. Héctor Camacho =

Boxing match

Opposites Attack
- Date: September 13, 1997
- Venue: Thomas & Mack Center, Paradise, Nevada, U.S.
- Title(s) on the line: WBC welterweight title

Tale of the tape
Boxer	Oscar De La Hoya	Hector Camacho
Nickname	The Golden Boy	Macho
Hometown	East Los Angeles, California, U.S.	Bayamon, Puerto Rico
Purse	$9,000,000	$3,000,000
Pre-fight record	25–0 (21 KO)	63–3–1 (32 KO)
Age	24 years, 7 months	35 years, 3 months
Height	5 ft 11 in (180 cm)	5 ft 7 in (170 cm)
Weight	147 lb (67 kg)	147 lb (67 kg)
Style	Orthodox	Southpaw
Recognition	WBC; Welterweight Champion; The Ring No. 1 ranked pound-for-pound fighter The Ring; No. 1 Ranked Welterweight; 3-division world champion	The Ring; No. 7 Ranked Light Middleweight; 3-division world champion

Result
- De La Hoya wins via 12-round unanimous decision (120-105, 120-106, 118-108)

Oscar De La Hoya vs. Hector Camacho, billed as Opposites Attack, was a professional boxing match contested on September 13, 1997 for the WBC welterweight championship.

== Background ==
In 1997, Oscar De La Hoya was a perfect 3–0. De La Hoya started the year by making a successful defense of the WBC light-welterweight title against Miguel Angel Gonzalez. Following this he would move up to the welterweight division to challenge Pernell Whitaker, still considered one of the best pound-for-pound fighters in boxing, for his WBC welterweight title. In a close fight, De La Hoya would ultimately defeat Whitaker by unanimous division to capture the welterweight title, his fourth world title in his fourth different division. De La Hoya would continue his winning ways in June by knocking out mandatory challenger David Kamau in the second round of his first welterweight title defense. The victory over Kamau officially put his September title defense against Hector Camacho on.

Camacho had been one of the top boxers in the 1980s, winning world titles in the super featherweight, lightweight and light welterweight divisions, but had not had a major world title fight since losing to Félix Trinidad in 1994. Following that loss, Camacho would go undefeated in his next 21 fights (20–0–1). Though most of the fighters he fought were unknown journeymen, Camacho did score two high-profile victories over two future hall-of-famers, first defeating Roberto Durán by unanimous decision on June 22, 1996, and then scoring a technical knockout victory over Sugar Ray Leonard On March 1, 1997 in what would prove to be the final fight of Leonard's career. After his defeat of Leonard, Camacho publicly challenged De La Hoya should he defeat Whitaker. De La Hoya accepted Camacho's challenge, jokingly stating that he would use a fight with Camacho as a "tune-up."

== The Fight ==
De La Hoya dominated the fight and picked up an overwhelmingly lopsided unanimous decision victory. Two of the judges had De La Hoya winning all 12 rounds with scores of 120–106 and 120–105, and while the third judge did give Camacho two rounds, he still scored the bout 118–108 in favor of De La Hoya.

From the opening bell, De La Hoya served as the aggressor and constantly attacked Camacho. Camacho tried to keep up with his younger and faster opponent, but simply could not land any sustained offense and was forced both to constantly retreat and clinch De La Hoya several times throughout the fight. After punishing Camacho for over eight rounds, De La Hoya would finally score a knockdown in the ninth after a left uppercut followed by two right hands sent Camacho to the mat with around 35 seconds left. Camacho was able to continue and survived the remainder of the round after clinching the aggressive De La Hoya when he closed in. Though De La Hoya would continue to dominate the remainder of the fight, he was unable to score the knockout victory. In the fight's 12th and final round, referee Richard Steele finally punished Camacho for his constant clinching by deducting a point from Camacho's score, making the fight even more lopsided in De La Hoya's favor.

== Aftermath ==
De La Hoya would continue his success in 1997 by winning his fifth fight in the year after defeating Wilfredo Rivera on December 6. Prior to the fight De La Hoya would end his brief working relationship with trainer Emanuel Steward, who he felt had not spent enough time with him in getting ready for his fight with Rivera. To replace Steward, De La Hoya lured legendary trainer Gil Clancy out of retirement to become his new trainer.

For Camacho, the fight with De La Hoya would prove to be the final major title fight of his career, though he would continue to fight on-and-off until 2010. Camacho was murdered late in 2012.

== Undercard ==
Confirmed bouts:

== Broadcasting ==
Country	Broadcaster
United States	HBO
Thailand	Channel 7

Preceded by vs. David Kamau	Oscar De La Hoya's bouts 13 September 1997	Succeeded by vs. Wilfredo Rivera
Preceded by vs. Sugar Ray Leonard	Héctor Camacho's bouts 13 September 1997	Succeeded by vs. Tommy Small
