= Kendall Holt =

American boxer

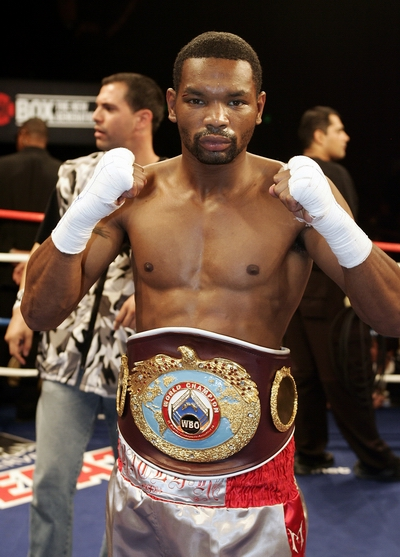
- Holt after winning the WBO title, 2008

Personal information
- Nickname: Rated R
- Nationality: American
- Born: June 14, 1981 (age 45) Paterson, New Jersey, U.S.
- Height: 5 ft 9 in (175 cm)
- Weight: Light welterweight

Boxing career
- Reach: 74 in (188 cm)
- Stance: Orthodox

Boxing record
- Total fights: 34
- Wins: 28
- Win by KO: 16
- Losses: 6

Kendall Holt (born June 14, 1981) is an American former professional boxer who competed from 2001 to 2013, and held the WBO junior welterweight title from 2008 to 2009.

== Early life ==
Holt had a very tough upbringing in his native Paterson, New Jersey, where he attended John F. Kennedy High School. He was raised by his father after a difficult childhood, which culminated with his mother Debra Holt being convicted of killing a homeless man, dubbed as a "thrill killing", during an evening of senseless violence and crime. This was discussed as a feature before Holt's Showtime Championship Boxing bout with Timothy Bradley on April 4, 2009. Holt was taken from his father while he was young due to child abuse, and was put into foster care.

== Professional career ==
Holt made his professional debut in 2001 and won his first 15 fights, before he fought Gilberto Reyes on March 26, 2004. Holt viciously knocked out Reyes with a counter left hook that froze his opponent for a split second before he crashed face first to the canvas.

The sensational knockout garnered Holt the status of a rising prospect in the welterweight division, but Holt was surprisingly knocked out by Thomas Davis on June 18, 2004, at the DePaul Athletic Center in Chicago, Illinois. Holt was dominating the first round, when Davis dropped Holt to the canvas with a straight right hand. Holt got up, but was on unsteady legs as Davis landed three more strong blows down the middle including another punishing right cross to the chin. Holt crumbled to the canvas for the final time as the referee stopped the fight.

Holt won his next two fights in New Jersey, before moving down to light welterweight to take on 1996 US Olympian David Díaz on February 4, 2005, at the Foxwoods Casino in Mashantucket, Connecticut. Holt caught Díaz with a whip-like left hook to the head followed by a sharp right hand that dropped him in round one along with opening a cut around his right eye. Diaz finally found the range in the seventh round and floored Holt with two right hands to the head. Holt survived the knockdown and in the next round, stunned Díaz with a blistering five-punch volley of left hooks and right hands to the face. Diaz retreated on wobbly legs; however, Holt continued to unload with both hands and connected with another sharp flurry of shots. The referee had seen enough and stopped the fight, awarding Holt an upset technical knockout victory.

In his next fight, Holt fought Jaime Rangel for the vacant WBO Intercontinental light welterweight title on May 27, 2005, in Pompano Beach, Florida. Just before the bell to end the opening round, Rangel dropped Holt with a right hook to the jaw and a counter left cross. Holt was up at the count of two and was able to shake of the effects of the knockdown. Holt regained his poise and landed the harder cleaner shots for the rest of the evening. Despite that Holt had convincing won the fight, he had to settle for a split decision victory as one judge gave the fight to Rangel.

After defeating Vladimir Khodokovski by unanimous decision, Holt fought Isaac Hlatswayo for the vacant WBO NABO light welterweight title on November 3, 2006 at Bally's Casino in Atlantic City, New Jersey. Holt went on to drop Hlatshwayo in rounds nine, eleven, and twelve to win by unanimous decision.

Holt fought Mike Arnaoutis in a WBO light welterweight title eliminator on April 20, 2007, in Atlantic City, New Jersey. Holt dominated almost all of the exchanges with Arnaoutis and eventually dropped him in the final round with a riveting right hand to the jaw en route to a unanimous decision victory. the victory made Holt the mandatory challenger for WBO junior welterweight champion Ricardo Torres.

=== Torres vs. Holt, controversy ===
Holt fought Colombia's powerhouse Ricardo Torres on September 1, 2007 in Barranquilla, Colombia. Holt was in command of the fight, knocking down Torres with a left-right combination in the sixth round. Holt was ahead of Torres on two of three scorecards entering the eleventh round, but Torres knocked down Holt with a vicious left hook, giving Torres a chance to make a comeback in the fight. As Holt got up, fans began hurling full beer cans, bottles, cans of soda, ice, and water into the ring. Holt tried to hold on, run, and get through the round without taking more punishment by Torres. As Holt did not throw any punch back, the referee, Genaro Rodriguez, decided to stop the fight, so Holt did not take any more unnecessary punishment.

After the fight, Holt claimed that after he knocked Torres down in the sixth round, he was hit in the head with loaded beer cans. Tapes of the bout support that claim. He also claimed that someone in Torres' corner reached through the ropes and grabbed Holt's leg during the eleventh round. Holt had a heated exchange with Rodriguez after the fight when they met in the Barranquilla Plaza Hotel. Holt shouted obscenities at Rodriguez for not giving a break in the action due to fans throwing objects in the ring, making the surface slippery. Darren Antola, Holt's cut man, was hit with a beer can to the back of his head as he prepared to head to the airport for his flight back to New Jersey. Ashema Evans, Holt's girlfriend, suffered a cut on her leg when fans began toppling tables in the VIP section to bum rush the ring.

Later, Bob Arum of Top Rank, declared that Torres clearly won the fight and that Holt's claims are ungrounded. Billy Chams of Cuadrilátero stated in a press release that "The environment never turned dangerous, as Kendall Holt and his representatives seemed to imply to the press when they arrived to Miami last Sunday. They merely misinterpreted and confused an emotional and excessive joy display of the crowd that watched how his champion, after being closely behind in the scorecards, turned the fight over in round eleven and knocked down Holt. He was in a very bad shape and the referee acted wisely stopping the fight."

Patrick English, Holt's attorney, was bewildered by Arum’s evaluation of the controversial conclusion to the light welterweight title fight. “I’m very disappointed in (Arum) choosing to involve himself in this, mostly because he involved himself in a way that is inaccurate,” English said regarding Arum’s statements.

On September 18, 2007, The Kendall Holt camp completed a formal protest of the fight. The protest includes 35 pages of documentation including certifications by Holt, manager Henry Cortes and boxing writer Keith Idec, a report by Commissioner Larry Hazzard Jr., still photos, and video evidence. On October 5, the WBO denied Holt's request for a reversal of the loss, citing that only the Colombian Boxing Commission can make such a ruling. The WBO also denied Holt's request for an immediate rematch, but kept him high in the rankings in order to land another title shot. This set up a rematch with Torres.

=== Return to the ring ===
In his first appearance since the fight with Torres, Holt fought Ben Tackie on February 7, 2008, at the Hard Rock Hotel & Casino in Las Vegas, Nevada. Holt stayed away by using his movement as Tackie was unable to get off with his punches. He tried, but was just too slow for the much quicker Holt. Holt took no chances, as he stayed away and landed three-punch counters to every one-punch of Tackie. Holt went on to win by majority decision.

=== Torres vs. Holt II ===
On July 5, 2008, at the Planet Hollywood Resort and Casino in Las Vegas, Holt and Torres faced off in a rematch that lasted just 61 seconds. The round was described by BoxingScene.com as the front runner for Round of the Year. Just 13 seconds into the fight, a right hand by Torres had Holt down on the canvas. Holt recovered but found himself on the canvas for the second time just seconds later. Holt got up and, while being castigated by Torres in the corner, managed to connect with a left hook and knocked Torres out. An accidental clash of heads immediately preceded the knockout, however, and some attributed the knockout to that instead of the punch Holt threw.

=== Holt vs. Hopkins ===
With controversy again surrounding their fights Holt and Torres signed for a rubber match, which was to be held at Boardwalk Hall in Atlantic City on December 14, 2008 and televised on ShoBox. However, a week before the fight Torres pulled out due to illness and Holt instead fought the undefeated Demetrius Hopkins. Holt won the fight by split decision (116-112, 117-111, and 113-115).

The win set up a title unification match between WBO champion Holt and WBC super lightweight champion Timothy Bradley.

=== Holt vs. Bradley ===
Holt and Bradley squared off in the unification bout on April 4, 2009 in Montreal's Bell Centre. Holt knocked Bradley down in the first round and the twelfth round, but Bradley won a majority of the rounds in between and took a unanimous decision win (115-111, 114-112, and 115-111) to take Holt's WBO championship. In a post-fight interview Holt said he felt that he had not done enough to win the fight and called for a rematch, but as of 2014 it has not happened and Bradley has since moved out of the light welterweight class and is currently fighting at welterweight.

=== Post-Bradley ===
On March 10, 2010, Holt fought Kaizer Mabuza in an IBF-title eliminator and entered as the favorite. Mabuza, however, controlled the fight from the start and Holt retired on his stool after six rounds.

In his next fight Holt knocked out Lenin Arroyo in one round and followed that up with a knockout of former lightweight champion Julio Díaz in three. This set up a fight with undefeated Danny Garcia as part of an HBO pay-per-view card featuring a fight between Bernard Hopkins and Chad Dawson as the main event, with the NABO junior welterweight championship at stake. Holt lost by split decision.

After defeating his next opponent Holt fought IBF champion Lamont Peterson on February 22, 2013, and was knocked out in eight rounds. He has yet to return to the ring.

== Troubles outside the ring ==
Holt's manager, Henry Cortes, became embroiled in legal troubles over drug deals he helped facilitate. Cortes was arrested in February 2009 on charges relating to those deals. Although Holt had not been implicated in those charges, he pleaded guilty to money laundering charges in April 2009 and admitted he had delivered money to Torres knowing that they were from drug transactions brokered by Cortes. Holt was put into a pretrial intervention program, with the expectation that the charges would be dropped upon completion. Holt successfully completed that program and the charges were dismissed.

== Professional boxing record ==
34 fights	28 wins	6 losses
By knockout	16	4
By decision	12	2

No.	Result	Record	Opponent	Type	Round, time	Date	Location	Notes
34	Loss	28–6	Lamont Peterson	TKO	8 (12), 1:42	Feb 22, 2013	D.C. Armory, Washington, D.C., U.S.	For IBF light welterweight title
33	Win	28–5	Tim Coleman	TKO	2 (10), 2:23	Mar 15, 2012	Morongo Casino Resort & Spa, Cabazon, California, U.S.	
32	Loss	27–5	Danny García	SD	12	Oct 15, 2011	Staples Center, Los Angeles, California, U.S.	For vacant WBO Inter-Continental light welterweight title
31	Win	27–4	Julio Díaz	TKO	3 (10), 2:37	May 13, 2011	Chumash Casino Resort, Santa Ynez, California, U.S.	
30	Win	26–4	Lenin Arroyo	TKO	1 (8), 1:50	Jan 29, 2011	Silverdome, Pontiac, Michigan, U.S.	
29	Loss	25–4	Kaizer Mabuza	RTD	6 (12), 3:00	Feb 27, 2010	Bally's, Atlantic City, New Jersey, U.S.	
28	Loss	25–3	Timothy Bradley	UD	12	Apr 4, 2009	Bell Centre, Montreal, Quebec, Canada	Lost WBO light welterweight title; For WBC light welterweight title
27	Win	25–2	Demetrius Hopkins	SD	12	Dec 13, 2008	Boardwalk Hall, Atlantic City, New Jersey, U.S.	Retained WBO light welterweight title
26	Win	24–2	Ricardo Torres	KO	1 (12), 1:01	Jul 5, 2008	Planet Hollywood Resort & Casino, Paradise, Nevada, U.S.	Won WBO light welterweight title
25	Win	23–2	Ben Tackie	MD	10	Feb 7, 2008	The Joint, Paradise, Nevada, U.S.	
24	Loss	22–2	Ricardo Torres	TKO	11 (12), 2:24	Sep 1, 2007	Salon Jumbo del Country Club, Barranquilla, Colombia	For WBO light welterweight title
23	Win	22–1	Mike Arnaoutis	UD	12	Apr 20, 2007	Bally's Park Place, Atlantic City, New Jersey, U.S.	
22	Win	21–1	Isaac Hlatshwayo	UD	12	Nov 3, 2006	Bally's Park Place, Atlantic City, New Jersey, U.S.	Won vacant NABO light welterweight title
21	Win	20–1	Volodymyr Khodakovskyy	UD	10	Sep 24, 2005	Boardwalk Hall, Atlantic City, New Jersey, U.S.	
20	Win	19–1	Jaime Rangel	SD	12	May 27, 2005	Club Cinema, Pompano Beach, Florida, U.S.	Won vacant WBO Inter-Continental light welterweight title
19	Win	18–1	David Díaz	TKO	8 (10), 2:26	Feb 4, 2005	Foxwoods Resort Casino, Ledyard, Connecticut, U.S.	
18	Win	17–1	Carlos Antonio Escobar	UD	6	Dec 9, 2004	Robert Treat Center, Newark, New Jersey, U.S.	
17	Win	16–1	Roberto Ortega	UD	6	Oct 14, 2004	Robert Treat Center, Newark, New Jersey, U.S.	
16	Loss	15–1	Thomas Davis	TKO	1 (8), 2:59	Jun 18, 2004	DePaul Athletic Center, Chicago, Illinois, U.S.	
15	Win	15–0	Gilberto Reyes	KO	1 (8), 2:23	Mar 26, 2004	Miccosukee Resort & Gaming, Miami, Florida, U.S.	
14	Win	14–0	John Trigg	MD	8	Dec 6, 2003	Madison Square Garden, New York City, New York, U.S.	
13	Win	13–0	Norberto Frias	KO	3 (6)	Oct 24, 2003	Fernwood Resort, Bushkill, Pennsylvania, U.S.	
12	Win	12–0	Richard Best	TKO	2 (4), 1:53	Apr 25, 2003	Thunderbird Wild Wild West Casino, Norman, Oklahoma, U.S.	
11	Win	11–0	Cardyl Finley	TKO	2 (6)	Mar 15, 2003	D.C. Armory, Washington, D.C.	
10	Win	10–0	Andriy Trunov	UD	6	Nov 7, 2002	Hilton, Washington, D.C., U.S.	
9	Win	9–0	Kevin Carter	TKO	1 (6), 2:59	Oct 11, 2002	Freeman Coliseum, San Antonio, Texas, U.S.	
8	Win	8–0	Norberto Frias	UD	6	Jul 12, 2002	Casino Ballroom, Hampton Beach, New Hampshire, U.S.	
7	Win	7–0	Rashaan Abdul Blackburn	TKO	5 (6)	Apr 20, 2002	John F. Kennedy High School, Paterson, New Jersey, U.S.	
6	Win	6–0	Curtis Wilkens	TKO	3 (6), 2:40	Mar 3, 2002	Catholic Youth Center, Scranton, Pennsylvania, U.S.	
5	Win	5–0	Matt Hill	TKO	2 (4), 1:49	Dec 14, 2001	Mohegan Sun Arena, Montville, Connecticut, U.S.	
4	Win	4–0	Marcus Luck	PTS	4	Oct 26, 2001	Sands, Atlantic City, New Jersey, U.S.	
3	Win	3–0	Marat Sunyuntaev	KO	2 (4)	Jun 26, 2001	USS Intrepid (CV-11), New York City, New York, U.S.	
2	Win	2–0	Jonathan Kuhn	TKO	1 (4)	Apr 20, 2001	Cintas Center, Cincinnati, Ohio, U.S.	
1	Win	1–0	Frank Zorchak	KO	1 (4)	Mar 30, 2001	Atlantic City, New Jersey, U.S.	

Sporting positions
Regional boxing titles
Vacant Title last held by Muhammad Abdullaev	WBO Inter-Continental junior welterweight champion May 27, 2005 – March 2006; Vacated	Vacant Title next held by Arturo Morua
Vacant Title last held by Mike Arnaoutis	NABO junior welterweight champion November 3, 2006 – January 2007; Vacated	Vacant Title next held by Henry Bruseles
World boxing titles
Preceded by Ricardo Torres	WBO junior welterweight champion July 5, 2008 – April 4, 2009	Succeeded by Timothy Bradley
