= Danny Garcia vs. Zab Judah =

Boxing match

- Date: April 27, 2013
- Venue: Barclays Center, Brooklyn, New York
- Title(s) on the line: WBA, WBC and The Ring light welterweight titles

Tale of the tape
Boxer	(United States) Danny Garcia	(United States) Zab Judah
Nickname	"Swift"	"Super"
Hometown	Philadelphia, Pennsylvania	Brownsville, Brooklyn, New York
Purse	$1,250,000	$300,000
Pre-fight record	25-0 (16 KO)	42–7 (2) (29 KO)
Age	25 years, 1 month	35 years, 6 months
Height	5 ft 8 1/2 in (174 cm)	5 ft 7 1/2 in (171 cm)
Weight	139 3/4 lb (63 kg)	140 lb (64 kg)
Style	Orthodox	Southpaw
Recognition	WBA, WBC and The Ring; Light Welterweight Champion; TBRB; No. 1 Ranked Light Welterweight	WBA; No. 5 Ranked Light Welterweight; WBC; No. 10 Ranked Light Welterweight; The Ring; No. 4 Ranked Light Welterweight; TBRB; No. 7 Ranked Light Welterweight; 2-division world champion

Result
- Garcia defeated Judah by unanimous decision (115-112, 114-112, 116-111)

Danny Garcia vs. Zab Judah was a professional boxing match contested on April 27, 2013, for the Ring junior welterweight, WBA Super Lightweight title and WBC light welterweight championship at the Barclays Center in Brooklyn, New York on Showtime.

== Background ==
On November 6, 2012, Golden Boy Promotions announced a deal had been reached for unified light welterweight champion Danny García to defend his titles against former two-weight champion Zab Judah, with the Barclays Center being the front runners to host the event on January 19, 2013. On December 1, the official press conference got heated up between Judah and Angel Garcia (Danny father), after he had begun to insult Judah over his previous losses and performances. Judah eventually stood up and shouted, "I have a lot of respect for his father but I won't be disrespected."

The bout was originally set to be held on February 9, but was rescheduled due to a rib injury sustained by Garcia during training. Judah was a 4-to-1 betting underdog entering his 19th and ultimately last world-title bout.

== The fight ==
Garcia started the fight off strong landing body shots. Judah was knocked down counter right hand from Garcia in the eighth round.

Garcia won the fight due to a unanimous decision. The official judges scored the fight 115–112, 114-112 and 116–111.

== Aftermath ==
Speaking in the post-fight interview Garcia said "It was a hell of a fight. He's a crafty veteran with power. He hit me with a good shot in the eleventh, but I'm a true champion. Judah's the most craftiest and strongest fighter I've fought so far."

== Fight card ==
Confirmed bouts:

=== Main Event ===
- Light Welterweight Championship bout: (United States) Danny Garcia vs. (United States) Zab Judah

=== Undercard ===
- Middleweight Championship bout: (United States) Peter Quillin vs. (United States) Fernando Guerrero
- Middleweight bout: (United States) Daniel Jacobs vs. (United States) Keenan Collins
- Middleweight bout: (United States) Boyd Melson vs. (United States) Joshua Snyder
- Light Heavyweight: (United States) Marcus Browne vs. (United States) Taneal Goyco

== Broadcasting ==
Country	Broadcaster
United States	Showtime

Preceded by vs. Erik Morales	Danny Garcia's bouts 27 April 2013	Succeeded by vs. Lucas Matthysse
Preceded by vs. Vernon Paris	Zab Judah's bouts 27 April 2013	Succeeded by vs. Paulie Malignaggi
