= Sugar Ray Leonard vs. Terry Norris =

1991 boxing match

- Date: February 9, 1991
- Venue: Madison Square Garden, New York, New York, U.S.
- Title(s) on the line: WBC light middleweight title

Tale of the tape
Boxer	Terry Norris	Ray Leonard
Nickname	Terrible	Sugar
Hometown	Campo, California, U.S.	Palmer Park, Maryland, U.S.
Purse	$1,000,000	$4,000,000
Pre-fight record	26–3 (14 KO)	36–1–1 (25 KO)
Age	23 years, 7 months	34 years, 8 months
Height	5 ft 10 in (178 cm)	5 ft 10 in (178 cm)
Weight	152 1/2 lb (69 kg)	154 lb (70 kg)
Style	Orthodox	Orthodox
Recognition	WBC; Light Middleweight champion The Ring; No. 1 Ranked Light Middleweight	The Ring; No. 2 Ranked Light Middleweight; 5-division world champion

Result
- Norris wins via 12-round unanimous decision (119-103, 120-104, 116-110)

Sugar Ray Leonard vs. Terry Norris was a professional boxing match contested on February 9, 1991, for the WBC super welterweight title.

== Background ==
After winning the WBC super middleweight in December 1988, "Sugar" Ray Leonard successfully defended the title twice in 1989 against two of his biggest rivals, first fighting Thomas Hearns to a draw in June and then defeating Roberto Durán by unanimous decision in December. A month after the Durán fight, Leonard vacated the WBC super middleweight title as the WBC was pressuring Leonard to make another defense and Leonard was unsure when he would fight again. Leonard pursued a rematch with Marvin Hagler, but Hagler refused and opted to remain retired stating "A while ago, yeah, I wanted him so bad, but I'm over that." Leonard was also in talks for a third fight with Hearns, but Hearns, who was then fighting as a light heavyweight, would not agree to the 162 pound catch-weight Leonard wanted, insisting he could no longer make that weight. Leonard would ultimately not fight at all in 1990, but by year's end Leonard would reach an agreement to fight WBC super welterweight (AKA light middleweight) champion Terry Norris. Though Norris was both the champion and 11 years younger than Leonard, and despite Leonard's inactivity, Leonard was a 12-to-5 favorite going into the fight.

Leonard's lawyer and adviser Mike Trainer agreed to broadcast the fight on Showtime. Executives from Showtime's rival network HBO, which had employed Leonard as a broadcaster since 1978, decided to release Leonard from his broadcasting contract after not being given the opportunity to bid on the rights to air the fight. HBO sports head Seth Abraham stated "If HBO is not offered the opportunity to bid on the fight, then it's inappropriate for Ray to continue as an HBO broadcaster."

== The fight ==
The fight was a one-sided affair as Norris dominated Leonard en route to a unanimous decision victory. Norris would score two knockdowns over Leonard, the first occurred during the last 10 seconds of the second round after Norris countered a Leonard combination with a left hand. As Leonard was down, Norris would run forward and land another right hand for which referee Arthur Mercante Jr. warned Norris after the round that he would be disqualified should he commit a foul like that again. Norris sent Leonard down again late in the seventh round with a short right hand. Norris would go on the attack in an effort to finish the fight, but a dazed Leonard was able to survive the round. Norris would control the remainder of the fight though Leonard would make it through the 12th and final round. All three judges had Norris the victor with scores of 120–104, 119–103 and 116–110.

== Aftermath ==
Once the scorecards were read, Leonard announced to the crowd that the fight would be his last, but he returned for one more fight in 1997.

== Fight card ==
Confirmed bouts:

Weight Class	Weight		vs.		Method	Round	Notes
Super Welterweight	154 lb	Terry Norris (c)	def.	Ray Leonard	UD	12/12	^{Note 1}
Super Middlweight	168 lb	Segundo Mercado	def.	Alex Ramos	TKO	4/10
Heavyweight	200+ lb	Orlin Norris	def.	Jamie Howe	TKO	7/10
Middleweight	160 lb	Willie Monroe	def	Genaro Castro	UD	10/10

^Note 1 For WBC Super Welterweight title

== Broadcasting ==
Country	Broadcaster
United Kingdom	BBC
United States	Showtime
Thailand	Channel 9 (modern day 9MCOT HD)

Preceded by vs. Rene Jacquot	Terry Norris's bouts 9 February 1991	Succeeded by vs. Donald Curry
Preceded by vs. Roberto Durán III	Sugar Ray Leonard's bouts 9 February 1991	Succeeded by vs. Héctor Camacho
Awards
Preceded by Mike Tyson vs. Buster Douglas	KO Magazine Upset of the Year; 1991	Succeeded by Jeff Fenech vs. Azumah Nelson II
