= Christian Giudice =

American boxing writer (born 1974)

Christian Giudice (born June 5, 1974) is an American boxing writer and editor who has published boxing biographies. The biopic film Hands of Stone was based on Giudice's book with the same title.

Raised in Haddonfield, New Jersey, Giudice attended Haddonfield Memorial High School.

== Books ==
- Hands of Stone:The Life and Legend of Roberto Duran - about boxer Roberto Durán
- Beloved Warrior:The Rise and Fall of Alexis Arguello - about boxer and politician Alexis Arguello
- A Fire Burns Within - about boxer Wilfredo Gómez
- Macho Time: The meteoric rise and Tragic Fall of Hector Camacho - about boxer Hector Camacho
