= Demetrius Hopkins =

American boxer

Personal information
- Nickname: The Gladiator
- Nationality: (United States) American
- Born: Demetrius Hopkins; October 10, 1980 (age 45) Philadelphia, PA, U.S.
- Weight: Light Welterweight

Boxing career
- Stance: Orthodox

Boxing record
- Total fights: 37
- Wins: 33
- Win by KO: 13
- Losses: 3
- Draws: 1

Demetrius Hopkins (born October 10, 1980 in Philadelphia, Pennsylvania, U.S.) is an American boxer who fought in the light welterweight division.

== Career ==
As an amateur, Hopkins was the 1999 National Golden Gloves Light welterweight champion.

Hopkins won the USBA light-welterweight championship when he beat Mario Jose Ramos by a unanimous decision.

On June 7, 2006, Hopkins had a knockout win against Michael Warrick.

Hopkins beat The Contender TV reality show star Steve Forbes on March 17, 2007, in a unanimous decision.

Hopkins fought twice more in 2007, beating Jailer Berrio with a first round knockout in July and Enrigay Colin by a unanimous decision.

Hopkins fought in a December 23, 2012 against WBO junior welterweight champion Danny "El Parches" Hernandez and lost by split decision. Hopkins is the nephew of former undisputed middleweight and light heavyweight champion Bernard Hopkins.

== Professional boxing record ==
37 fights	33 wins	3 losses
By knockout	13	0
By decision	20	3
Draws	1	

No.	Result	Record	Opponent	Type	Round, time	Date	Location	Notes
37	Loss	33–3–1	Jermell Charlo	UD	12	Jun 8, 2013	Home Depot Center, Carson, California, U.S.	Lost IBF-USBA light middleweight title; For WBC Continental Americas light middleweight title
36	Win	33–2–1	Charles Whittaker	RTD	6 (12), 3:00	Feb 16, 2013	Boardwalk Hall, Atlantic City, New Jersey, U.S.	Won IBF-USBA light middleweight title
35	Win	32–2–1	Joshua Snyder	TKO	5 (8), 1:26	Nov 17, 2012	Boardwalk Hall, Atlantic City, New Jersey, U.S.	
34	Win	31–2–1	Doel Carrasquillo	UD	8	Sep 8, 2012	The Hangar, Costa Mesa, California, U.S.	
33	Loss	30–2–1	Brad Solomon	UD	10	Mar 18, 2011	Seminole Hard Rock Hotel and Casino, Fort Lauderdale, Florida, U.S.	
32	Win	30–1–1	Mike Arnaoutis	UD	10	Jul 2, 2010	Citizens Business Bank Arena, Ontario, California, U.S.	
31	Win	29–1–1	Jesse Feliciano	UD	10	Mar 25, 2010	Commerce Casino, Commerce, California, U.S.	
30	Loss	28–1–1	Kendall Holt	SD	12	Dec 13, 2008	Boardwalk Hall, Atlantic City, New Jersey, U.S.	For WBO light welterwieght title
29	Win	28–0–1	Enrique Colin	UD	10	Nov 17, 2007	Borgata Hotel and Casino, Atlantic City, New Jersey, U.S.	
28	Win	27–0–1	Jailer Berrio	TKO	1 (10), 2:57	Jul 21, 2007	Mandalay Bay, Paradise, Nevada, U.S.	
27	Win	26–0–1	Steve Forbes	UD	12	Mar 17, 2007	Mandalay Bay, Paradise, Nevada, U.S.	Retained IBF-USBA light welterweight title
26	Win	25–0–1	Rogelio Castañeda Jr.	UD	12	Nov 25, 2006	Dodge Arena, Hidalgo, Texas, U.S.	Retained IBF-USBA light welterweight title
25	Win	24–0–1	Michael Warrick	KO	9 (12), 1:58	Jun 7, 2006	Borgata Hotel and Casino, Atlantic City, New Jersey, U.S.	
24	Win	23–0–1	Mario Ramos	UD	12	Mar 3, 2006	New Alhambra, Philadelphia, Pennsylvania, U.S.	Won vacant IBF-USBA light welterweight title
23	Win	22–0–1	Jesse Feliciano	KO	4 (10), 2:23	Dec 3, 2005	Mandalay Bay, Paradise, Nevada, U.S.	
22	Win	21–0–1	Ernesto Zepeda	TKO	9 (10), 1:07	Oct 13, 2005	Borgata Hotel and Casino, Atlantic City, New Jersey, U.S.	
21	Win	20–0–1	Paul Delgado	TKO	8 (10), 1:15	Aug 4, 2005	Borgata Hotel and Casino, Atlantic City, New Jersey, U.S.	
20	Win	19–0–1	Roberto Valenzuela	UD	8	Jun 16, 2005	Sundance Square, Fort Worth, Texas, U.S.	
19	Win	18–0–1	Norberto Bravo	UD	10	Mar 25, 2005	Desert Diamond Casino, Tucson, Arizona, U.S.	
18	Win	17–0–1	Francisco Javier García	UD	8	Feb 19, 2005	Staples Center, Los Angeles, California, U.S.	
17	Win	16–0–1	Ubaldo Hernández	UD	8	Sep 17, 2004	Plaza Hotel & Casino, Las Vegas, Nevada, U.S.	
16	Win	15–0–1	Al Gonzalez	TD	7 (10), 3:00	Jun 18, 2004	DePaul Athletic Center, Chicago, Illinois, U.S.	Unanimous TD: Gonzalez cut by an accidental headbutt
15	Win	14–0–1	Roberto Ortega	KO	5 (10), 2:11	Oct 24, 2003	Fernwood Resort, Bushkill, Pennsylvania, U.S.	
14	Win	13–0–1	Shakha Moore	TKO	1 (10)	Jun 20, 2003	First Union Spectrum, Philadelphia, Pennsylvania, U.S.	
13	Win	12–0–1	Andre Eason	MD	10	Mar 21, 2003	Dover Downs, Dover, Delaware, U.S.	
12	Win	11–0–1	Edwin Vázquez	UD	8	Aug 6, 2002	Buchmuller Park, Secaucus, New Jersey, U.S.	
11	Win	10–0–1	Tyrone Wiggins	TKO	4 (6), 2:28	Mar 3, 2002	Catholic Youth Center, Scranton, Pennsylvania, U.S.	
10	Win	9–0–1	Ike Ezeji	UD	6	Dec 13, 2001	Mohegan Sun Casino, Montville, Connecticut, U.S.	
9	Draw	8–0–1	Bobby High	TD	2 (8)	Oct 26, 2001	Sands Hotel Casino, Atlantic City, New Jersey, U.S.	
8	Win	8–0	Rashaan Abdul Blackburn	TKO	3 (8), 1:34	Jul 14, 2001	Pepsi Center, Denver, Colorado, U.S.	
7	Win	7–0	Lenny Williams	KO	2 (4)	Apr 20, 2001	Cintas Center, Cincinnati, Ohio, U.S.	
6	Win	6–0	Melvin Jones	UD	6	Feb 20, 2001	Hyatt Regency Hotel, Baltimore, Maryland, U.S.	
5	Win	5–0	Jaime Palma	UD	6	Dec 8, 2000	The Blue Horizon, Philadelphia, Pennsylvania, U.S.	
4	Win	4–0	Andre Barker	UD	4	Oct 20, 2000	The Roxy, Boston, Massachusetts, U.S.	
3	Win	3–0	Antonio Young	UD	4	Aug 25, 2000	Casino Magic, Bay St. Louis, Mississippi, U.S.	
2	Win	2–0	Jaime Morales	UD	4	Jul 7, 2000	Cape Cod Melody Tent, Hyannis, Massachusetts, U.S.	
1	Win	1–0	William Butler	TKO	2 (4), 2:13	May 26, 2000	Foxwoods Resort Casino, Ledyard, Connecticut, U.S.	
