= Sugar Ray Leonard vs. Héctor Camacho =

Boxing match

Defying the Odds
- Date: March 1, 1997
- Venue: Convention Hall, Atlantic City, New Jersey, U.S.
- Title(s) on the line: IBC middleweight title

Tale of the tape
Boxer	Ray Leonard	Héctor Camacho
Nickname	Sugar	Macho
Hometown	Palmer Park, Maryland, U.S.	Bayamón, Puerto Rico
Purse	$4,000,000	$2,000,000
Pre-fight record	36–2–1 (25 KO)	62–3–1 (31 KO)
Age	40 years, 9 months	34 years, 9 months
Height	5 ft 10 in (178 cm)	5 ft 6 in (168 cm)
Weight	159 lb (72 kg)	158 3/4 lb (72 kg)
Style	Orthodox	Southpaw
Recognition	5-division world champion	IBC middleweight champion 3-division world champion

Result
- Camacho wins via 5th-round TKO

Sugar Ray Leonard vs. Héctor Camacho, billed as Defying the Odds, was a professional boxing match contested on March 1, 1997, for the IBC middleweight championship. The bout took place at the Convention Hall in Atlantic City, New Jersey, with Camacho's IBC title on the line. Camacho retained his title via fifth-round technical knockout.

== Background ==
In 1996, Sugar Ray Leonard began talks to end his fourth retirement and return to boxing to face former 3-division world champion Héctor Camacho. After months of negotiations, the fight was officially announced at a press conference in October. The 40-year old Leonard had not fought since losing to WBC super welterweight champion Terry Norris by a lopsided unanimous decision in February 1991, whilst the 34-year old Camacho had not won a major world title fight since 1990 and was also considered past his prime, though he had captured the lightly regarded IBC middleweight title after defeating Roberto Durán in June 1996. After defeating Duran, Camacho challenged Leonard, who was working as a broadcaster for the fight, and negotiations between the two fighters began two days later. Despite both fighters being past their prime, there was considerable hype for the fight as Leonard both appeared on the cover and was the subject of the feature story of the March 3, 1997 issue of Sports Illustrated and the decision was made to broadcast the fight on pay-per-view.

In December 1996, the fight was put in jeopardy when the New Jersey Casino Control Commission refused to allow New Contenders Inc. to promote the fight due to alleged organized crime ties and legal issues had by New Contenders chairman Michael Blutrich. Both the bout's sponsor Sun International and television provider TVKO (HBO's pay-per-view division) both pulled out as a result of the controversy. However, the fight was back on the following month after finding a new promoter (Dillon Promotions), a new sponsor (Caesars Atlantic City) and a new pay-per-view distributor (Titan Sports Inc.).

== The fight ==
Hampered by a previously undisclosed calf injury that limited his mobility, Leonard struggled throughout the fight. Camacho would open a cut over Leonard's eye in the fourth with an accidental headbutt. Camacho would then open the fifth round stunning Leonard with a left hook followed by a right hand and three left uppercuts that dropped Leonard to the canvas. A dazed Leonard would get up and continue the fight but Camacho swarmed in with a barrage of unanswered punches forcing the referee to stop the fight at 1:08 of the round, giving Camacho a victory by technical knockout.

== Aftermath ==
Speaking in the ring after the fight Leonard said "For sure, my career is definitely over". However, just a few days later, he changed his mind and said he would return with a series of tuneup fights before fighting a champion. Leonard was scheduled to fight Danny Phippen on 1 June, but the bout was postponed until July 22 after Leonard said his calf needed more time to heal. He was then set to face Dan Connolly on July 25, but he backed out because he said he didn't have enough time to train. Leonard then planned to meet Tony Menefee on February 15, 1998, in Sydney, Australia, but he pulled out of that fight as well.

== Fight card ==
Confirmed bouts:

Weight Class	Weight		vs.		Method	Round	Notes
Middleweight	160 lbs.	Héctor Camacho (c)	def.	Ray Leonard	TKO	5/12	^{Note 1}
Cruiserweight	200 lbs.	Robert Daniels	def.	Kenny Keene	SD	12/12
Light middleweight	154 lbs.	Charles Murray	def.	Livingstone Bramble	UD	10/10
Super Featherweight	130 lbs.	Paul Spadafora	def	Joe Lafontant	PTS	6/6

^Note 1 For IBC Middleweight title

== Broadcasting ==
Country	Broadcaster
Argentina	TyC Sports
Australia	Fox Sports
Canada	TSN
Japan	Wowow
Mexico	Televisa
United Kingdom	Sky Sports
United States	USA Network
Thailand	Channel 7

Preceded by vs. Terry Norris	Sugar Ray Leonard's bouts 1 March 1997	Retired
Preceded by vs. Heath Todd	Héctor Camacho's bouts 1 March 1997	Succeeded by vs. Oscar De La Hoya
