= Jesse Feliciano =

American boxer

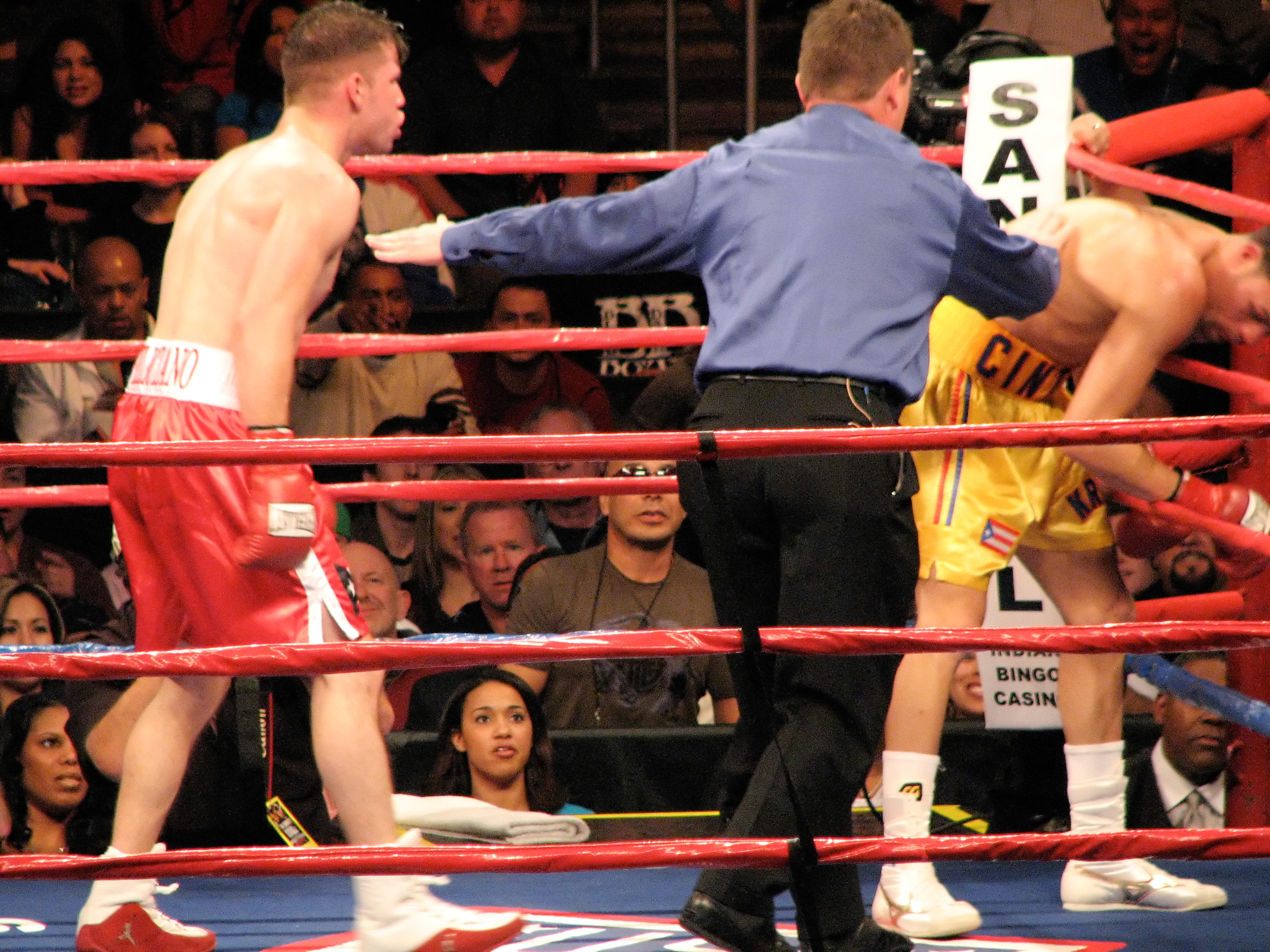
- Feliciano putting Kermit Cintrón in the corner in a 2007 fight

Personal information
- Nationality: American
- Born: September 20, 1982 (age 43) Los Angeles, California
- Height: 5 ft 9 in (175 cm)
- Weight: Welterweight; Super Lightweight

Boxing career
- Reach: 67 in (170 cm)

Boxing record
- Total fights: 28
- Wins: 15
- Win by KO: 9
- Losses: 10
- Draws: 3

Jesse Feliciano (born September 20, 1982) is an American retired professional boxer.

In 2007, he lost to Kermit Cintrón for the International Boxing Federation welterweight world title. The fight was on the Fernando Vargas v. Ricardo Mayorga Showtime PPV undercard.

Feliciano has defeated Vince Phillips, Delvin Rodriguez (for the USBA welterweight title), and Alfonso Gómez. Feliciano has a draw and loss to Gómez as well as losses to Willie Nelson, Demetrius Hopkins, Carlos Quintana, Mike Arnaoutis, and Muhammadqodir Abdullaev.
