= Héctor Camacho =

Puerto Rican boxer (1962–2012)

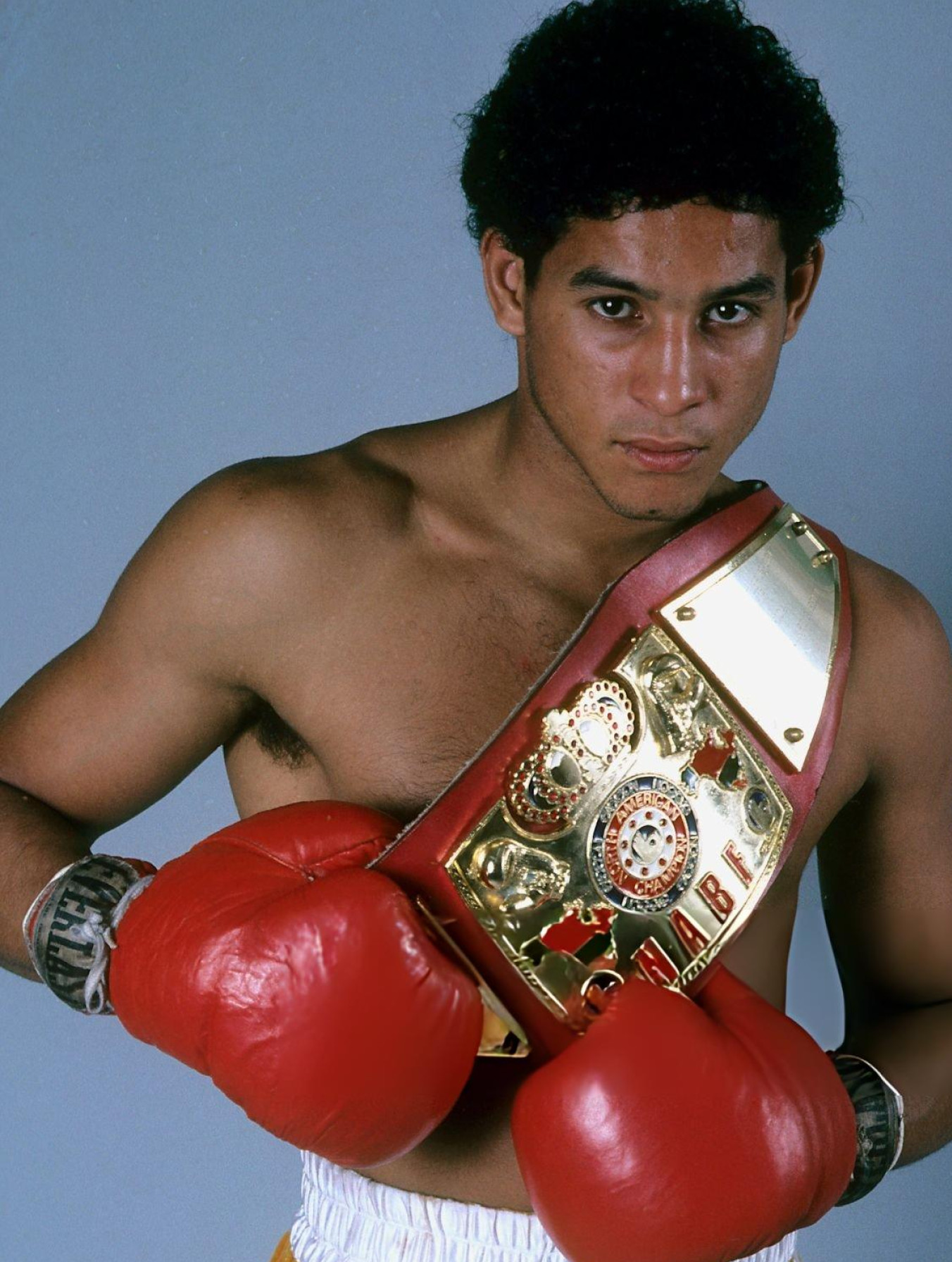
- Camacho in 1982

Personal information
- Nickname: Macho
- Born: Héctor Luis Camacho Matías; May 24, 1962 Bayamón, Puerto Rico
- Died: November 24, 2012 (aged 50) San Juan, Puerto Rico
- Height: 5 ft 7 in (170 cm)
- Weight: Super featherweight; Lightweight; Light welterweight; Welterweight; Light middleweight; Middleweight; Super middleweight

Boxing career
- Reach: 67 in (170 cm)
- Stance: Southpaw

Boxing record
- Total fights: 88
- Wins: 79
- Win by KO: 38
- Losses: 6
- Draws: 3

Héctor Luís Camacho Matías (May 24, 1962 – November 24, 2012), commonly known by his nickname "Macho Camacho", was a Puerto Rican professional boxer. Known for his quickness in the ring and flamboyant style, Camacho competed professionally from 1980 to 2010, and was a world champion in three weight classes. He held the WBC super featherweight title from 1983 to 1984, the WBC lightweight title from 1985 to 1987, and the WBO junior welterweight title twice between 1989 and 1992.

In a storied amateur career, Camacho won three New York Golden Gloves tournaments, beginning with the Sub-Novice 112 lbs championship in 1978. During his professional career, Camacho had many notable fights against some of the biggest names in boxing, defeating Rafael Limon, Jose Luis Ramirez, Edwin Rosario, Ray Mancini, Vinny Paz, Greg Haugen, Roberto Durán twice late in Duran's career, and knocking out Sugar Ray Leonard. He also fought Julio César Chávez, Félix Trinidad, and Oscar De La Hoya, among others.

During his later years, Camacho expanded his popular role and appeared on a variety of Spanish-language reality television shows including Univision's' dancing show Mira Quien Baila and a weekly segment on the popular show El Gordo y La Flaca, named "Macho News". However, he also had much-publicized troubles with drug abuse and criminal charges. In 2005, was sentenced to seven years in prison for burglarizing a computer store, but the judge suspended six years, allowing him to serve one year under house arrest and two years of probation if monitored by Puerto Rican authorities. He also faced a separate drug charge after ecstasy pills were found in his hotel room. In 2011 he was shot at three times by would-be carjackers in San Juan, but was uninjured. In late 2012, Camacho was awaiting trial in Florida on charges of physical abuse of one of his sons.

On November 20, 2012, Camacho was shot and seriously wounded while sitting in a car outside a bar in his native Bayamón; the driver, a childhood friend, was killed in the shooting. Camacho died four days later; after he was declared clinically brain dead, his mother requested the doctors remove him from life support. After lying in repose for two days in Santurce, Camacho's remains were transported to New York for burial at the request of his mother.

== Early life and amateur career ==
Héctor Luís Camacho Matías was born in Bayamón, Puerto Rico, to Héctor Luis Camacho Sr. and his wife María Matías. He was the second youngest of five children, which included a younger brother, Felix and sisters Raquel, Estrella, and Esperanza. When he was three, his parents separated, and his mother took the children with her to New York City. They lived in the James Weldon Johnson housing project in Spanish Harlem. Camacho attended local schools and ran into trouble as a teen, getting into street fights and landing in jail at fifteen. Pat Flannery, a language teacher in high school, helped the youth, teaching him to read and "acting like a father figure". When Camacho learned boxing and karate as a teenager, Flannery guided him to the Golden Gloves competitions. Demonstrating talent as a boxer, Camacho chose that sport as a career.

As an amateur, Camacho won three New York Golden Gloves Championships. Camacho won the 1978 112 lb Sub-Novice Championship, 1979 118 lb Open Championship, and 1980 119 lb Open Championship. In 1979 Camacho defeated Paul DeVorce of the Yonkers Police Athletic League in the finals to win the title, and, in 1980, Camacho defeated Tyrone Jackson in the finals to win the Championship.

In 1980 Camacho won Intercity Golden Gloves, defeating Orlando Johnson of Chicago.

Camacho completed his amateur career, having a hundred fights under his belt, with 96 wins, and 4 losses.

Camacho's nickname of "Macho" has been explained in various ways. According to his father, he gave him the nickname because he was his youngest son. According to the New York Times, his mentor Pat Flannery is the one who gave him the nickname during his teens. According to Camacho himself, the nickname came as a result of American co-workers at a factory who couldn't pronounce his last name.

=== Amateur Highlights ===
Camacho's major achievements in the amateur boxing:

- (gold) 1978 New York Golden Gloves Flyweight Sub-Novice Champion
- (gold) 1979 New York Golden Gloves Bantamweight Open Champion
- (gold) 1979 Intercity Golden Gloves 119-Pound Champion
- (gold) 1980 New York Golden Gloves Bantamweight Open Champion
- (gold) 1980 Intercity Golden Gloves 125-Pound Champion

== Professional career ==
After a stellar amateur career, Camacho began a quick rise through the professional rankings, first in the featherweight and then in the junior-lightweight division. He was so confident that he claimed he could beat world featherweight champions Salvador Sánchez and Eusebio Pedroza. However, Sánchez died while Camacho was still coming up in the ranks. In the junior-lightweight division, he defeated the top contenders Irleis Cubanito Perez, Melvin Paul, John Montes, and Refugio Rojas.

=== Super featherweight ===
External audio
- You may watch Hector "Macho" Camacho fight Rafael "Bazooka Limón", here on YouTube

When the World Junior Lightweight champion, Bobby Chacón, refused to go to Puerto Rico to defend his title against Camacho, the World Boxing Council (WBC) declared the world championship vacant. Rafael Limón, who had been defeated and lost the championship to Chacon, fought Camacho for the vacant title. It was the first time Camacho was in a ring with a former world champion; he scored a knockdown on Limón late in the third round and twice more in the fifth round before the referee stopped it.

Camacho also fought his first defense in San Juan, where he met Rafael Solis, a fellow Puerto Rican. He knocked out Solis with a right to the chin in round five, and retained the title.

=== Lightweight ===
Moving up to lightweight, Camacho won the United States Boxing Association title against Roque Montoya with a twelve-round decision. His victory in the next fight, broadcast on Home Box Office (HBO), made him a two-time world champion. Camacho beat the Mexican defending world champion, José Luis Ramírez in Las Vegas to win the WBC world Lightweight championship. Camacho dropped Ramirez in round three and won the fight by a unanimous twelve-round decision.

The two other reigning world champions in his division at that time, Livingstone Bramble and Jimmy Paul, were reluctant to unify the crown with Camacho. Instead, he beat Freddie Roach before his next fight of importance came along, ten months after beating Ramírez.

He met former WBC lightweight champion Edwin Rosario on June 13, 1986, at Madison Square Garden in New York City, a bout also broadcast on HBO. The fight was notable for the shifts of dominance between the men. Camacho dominated rounds one to four, but had to hang on in rounds five, six and seven, when he felt Rosario's power. He came back to take rounds eight and nine, but Rosario came back to take the last three rounds. It was a close fight, but Camacho retained the title by a split decision of the judges.

Camacho retained his title against Cornelius Boza-Edwards, a former world junior lightweight champion, in Miami in a unanimous decision, after dropping Edwards in the first round.

=== Light welterweight ===
He went up in weight and competed at the next level. After a few fights there, he met Ray "Boom Boom" Mancini, the former world lightweight champion who had a record of 29–3 with 23 knockouts, for the vacant WBO Light Welterweight title. Camacho was the fresher of the two and won a split twelve-round decision. He joined that exclusive group of world champion boxers who have become world champions in three weight divisions.

Camacho's next rival of note was Vinny Pazienza, whom he defeated on points. His next challenger was Tony Baltazar, from Phoenix. He defeated Baltazar by points in a fight televised by HBO. His undefeated streak came to an end, and he lost his world championship to Greg Haugen, the former world Lightweight champion. The referee had deducted one point from Camacho for refusing to touch gloves with Haugen at the start of the 12th round. After the fight, an unidentified substance was found in Haugen's urine, and a rematch was ordered. Camacho regained the title, beating Haugen in a close split decision.

In 1992 in Las Vegas, Camacho met Julio César Chávez, a formidable Mexican champion who was undefeated 81–0. Camacho entered the ring in an outfit based on the Puerto Rican flag; the fight was televised by Showtime's Pay Per View. Camacho was later criticized by some in the boxing press for his retreating tactics during the fight; Chávez kept pushing the fight and harassed him with hard punches to the body. The bout ended with a victory for Chávez by unanimous decision.

Since 1992 Camacho's notable fights included two victories (by points) over Roberto Durán, (one in Atlantic City, the other in Denver). In 1997, he knocked out Sugar Ray Leonard in five rounds. This loss sent the forty-one-year-old Leonard into permanent retirement, putting an end to his third comeback attempt six years after a loss to Terry Norris in 1991.

=== Welterweight and later career ===
Camacho fought for the World Welterweight Championship against Félix Trinidad (1994) and Oscar De La Hoya (1997), but he lost both matches by unanimous decisions.

On December 5, 2003, Camacho faced Craig Houk. It was an odd fight, as Houk continuously turned his back on Camacho throughout the fight. Camacho had Houk in trouble in the first round before Houk caught an overzealous Camacho with a left hook and floored him, the third knockdown against him in his career. Camacho bounced back up and battered Houk for the remainder of the round. He knocked Houk near the end of the first and eventually won by knockout in round three. He won consecutive unanimous ten-round decisions over Clinton McNeil and Raúl Jorge Muñoz. After that, his boxing career went on hiatus, as he faced criminal charges. He pled guilty to burglary and acknowledged drug abuse, but was given probation.

Camacho returned to boxing on July 18, 2008, competing against Perry Ballard for the World Boxing Empire's Middleweight Championship. The fight lasted seven rounds. Camacho won when Ballard's corner threw the towel. Before this fight, Camacho was trained by Angelo Dundee. His last two fights resulted in a draw and a loss, against Luis Ramón Campas and Saúl Duran, respectively. His last fight against Duran was on May 14, 2010.

== Later years and troubles ==
=== 2005 burglary ===
On January 6, 2005, Camacho was arrested by police in Gulfport, Mississippi on charges of trying to burglarize an electronic goods store and carrying the drug ecstasy on him. In 2007, he pleaded guilty to being under the influence at the time of the burglary. He was sentenced to 7 years in prison, but a judge eventually suspended all but one year of the sentence and gave Camacho probation. He served two weeks in jail after violating that probation.

=== 2011 shooting ===
On February 12, 2011, Camacho was attacked near the Luis Lloréns Torres housing project in San Juan. Camacho said he was taking a friend to a nearby bar when two men approached his vehicle (a 2005 BMW X5) and tried to carjack him. When he tried to drive away, they shot at him three times. He said that since "everybody loves me," he didn't think the men had realized who he was. He did not file a police report.

== 2012 shooting and death ==
On November 20, 2012, around 7 p.m. AST, Camacho was shot once in the jaw while sitting in a car, on Puerto Rico Highway 167, in Bayamón. Camacho, 50, was seated in the passenger seat of a friend's Ford Mustang when he was shot by unknown individuals from a passing SUV. The driver of the car, Adrian Mojica Moreno, Camacho's childhood friend, was killed in the attack. Camacho was taken to San Pablo Hospital in Bayamón, where he was reported to be in critical condition. Police said a chase took place and that the vehicle from which the shots were fired was found in the area of Jardines de Cataño. There were conflicting media reports, with an early claim that police arrested a suspect around 9 p.m. AST. Police investigating the incident said they found nine bags of cocaine in the car.

The bullet pierced Camacho's left mandible and fractured his fifth and sixth cervical vertebrae, lodging in his right shoulder and forming a lesion on his carotid artery that restricted blood flow to his brain. At one point doctors announced Camacho was expected to survive but might be paralyzed, but after he suffered a cardiac arrest during the night, doctors said they could find only minimal brain activity. The morning after the shooting, Rafael Rodríguez Mercado, director of the Medical Sciences Campus, reported to El Nuevo Día that Camacho was brain stem dead. "His full recovery would be a miracle; medically there is nothing more that can be done," stated Rodríguez Mercado. This was confirmed the next morning by Ernesto Torres, director of the hospital.

Camacho's mother Maria Matias announced on November 23 plans to have her son taken off life support once his three remaining sons arrived in Puerto Rico to be with him. Héctor Camacho was officially declared dead after a heart attack the following day. It was not possible for any of his organs to be donated to recipients because of the time that had passed between him being found clinically brain dead and when his heart stopped.

He was survived by his parents, his sons, two grandsons, his brother Félix and his sisters Raquel, Estrella and Esperanza. His oldest son, Hector Camacho Jr., said violence had overtaken Puerto Rico. "Death, jail, drugs, killings," he said. "That's what the streets are now." Puerto Rico's former governor, Luis Fortuno, said "'Macho' will always be remembered for his spontaneity and charisma in and out of the ring." Puerto Rican governor-elect, Alejandro Garcia Padilla, said Camacho had "united the country"; "We celebrated his triumphs in the streets and we applauded him with noble sportsmanship when he didn't prevail." Asked how he wished his son to be remembered, his father said for his clowning around and that he was a happy person, that he had revolutionized boxing by how he was dressed upon entering the ring.

=== Funeral and burial ===
After Camacho's death, his mother, María Matías, expressed the wish for her son to be buried in New York City, where he had grown up and started his fighting career. Camacho's son Héctor Camacho Jr. thought he should be buried in Puerto Rico, but agreed to his grandmother's and aunts' wishes.

Before being taken to the mainland United States, Camacho's body lay in state at the Puerto Rico Department of Sports and Recreation in Santurce. During the two days Camacho's body was on viewing, hundreds of people visited the facilities to pay tribute to the fighter.

Dozens of retired and active boxers from Puerto Rico and abroad were among those who participated in the funeral services. Among them were Félix "Tito" Trinidad, Wilfred Benítez, Wilfredo Gómez, John John Molina, Samuel Serrano, Román "Rocky" Martínez, Juan Manuel López, Nelson Dieppa, Alex "El Nene" Sánchez, Julian Solís, Manny Siaca, and the brothers McWilliams and McJoe Arroyo. Trinidad was outspoken in praise for his former rival, saying Camacho "put Puerto Rico's flag up high, with a lot of pride like many other champions have done. He was very loved. You can see how everybody has suffered the loss of this great human being, a great champion." Trinidad regretted the circumstances of the fatal shooting.

Camacho's body was flown to New York City on November 29 and presented at Elcock Funeral Home in Queens. On Friday, his body was taken to Saint Cecilia's Church in Manhattan for a religious service. Camacho was buried on December 1 in Saint Raymond's Cemetery in the Bronx. Before the burial, a parade was held in Camacho's honor in East Harlem. Two white horses pulled a hearse carriage up First Avenue surrounded by fans, friends and family of the late boxer. Camacho's casket was draped in a Puerto Rican flag. After a visitation and mass at St. Cecilia's Church on East 106th Street on November 30 and December 1, Camacho was buried on the afternoon of December 1, 2012, in Saint Raymond's Cemetery, Bronx in the Throggs Neck section of the Bronx.

=== Aftermath and investigation ===
Almost ten years later, on March 9, 2022, the Department of Justice of Puerto Rico arrested five suspects. William Rodríguez Rodríguez, Luis Ayala García, and Joshua Méndez Romero were serving federal sentences for unrelated crimes, and were flown in from Florida as part of what police called "Operation Knockout." The fourth suspect, Jesús Naranjo Adorno, was arrested in morning hours in the same city where Camacho was killed, and the fifth suspect, Juan Luis Figueroa Rivera, remains in prison in Puerto Rico for an unrelated case. Authorities also stated that two other suspects were killed in 2013 and 2015, in unrelated events.

== Legacy and honors ==
Several sports journalists, analysts, and experts from Puerto Rico and United States have praised Camacho's skills and influence in the boxing world. The journalist Rafael Bracero and Francisco Valcárcel, president of the World Boxing Organization, agreed that Camacho was among the "Top 5 Puerto Rican boxers" of all time, along with Félix "Tito" Trinidad, Wilfredo Gómez, and Wilfred Benítez. The boxing historian, Mario Rivera Martinó, praised Camacho, calling him a "complete fighter" in the Lightweight division. José Sulaimán stated that he "revolutionized boxing during his time".

Ed Brophy, director of the International Boxing Hall of Fame, noted Camacho's talents in attracting an audience. He said, "Camacho brought a lot of excitement to boxing. He was bright, colorful, and always gave something to talk about with his walks to the ring, with his unique style of entering, and the costumes he wore." Brophy also praised Camacho's boxing skills, describing him as "an exciting fighter, and one of the greats. He faced the best, going up and down several divisions." Alfredo R. Martínez, senior editor of ESPN Deportes, also noted Camacho's flamboyant approach, saying that "if he wasn't the first, he was one of the firsts that entered the ring with extravagant costumes, feather crests, bright clothes, everything to the rhythm of some pop song".

Hiram Martínez, senior editor of ESPN Deportes, said about Camacho's training:

he transforms into a hungry, focused, and dedicated boxer, that works hours and hours polishing his speed, his wit, and the style that turned him into one of the greats of all time. That's the only way you can explain why all those great hitters he faced during the best moments of his career never knocked him down.

Jaime Vega-Curry (deputy editor of ESPN Deportes), said Camacho was "a character that combined a contagious charisma, impressive boxing quality, a child's soul, a salesman's shrewdness, and a superlative confidence on himself and in the force of his 'Macho Time.'"

Brophy noted Camacho would be eligible for the International Boxing Hall of Fame in December 2015. He added that "Camacho is part of boxing history, and that's what the International Boxing Hall of Fame is about."

Camacho, along with Lupe Pintor and Hilario Zapata, among others, was voted into the International Boxing Hall of Fame in December 2015 and was inducted in June 2016.

Noted boxing biographer Christian Giudice wrote a book about Camacho's life titled Macho Time: The Meteoric Rise and Tragic Fall of Hector Camacho, which was released on October 20, 2020, by Hamilcar Publications.

Hector's fiancée, Shelly Salemassi, published a book of their real life story called The Lady and the Ten Time World Champ, Going The Distance With Hector Macho Camacho, which was released on December 1, 2021, by Page Publishing. ISBN 9781662434150

== Marriage and family ==
Camacho had four sons, his oldest from an early relationship and three from his marriage. His eldest son, Héctor "Machito" Camacho Jr. (born 1978 in New York, when Camacho was 16), also became a professional boxer and has won a championship.

Camacho married Amy Torres in 1991, and they had three sons: Justin (born December 1, 1989), Christian (born 1992), and Tyler Camacho (born 1998). (The New York Times reports the youngest son's name as "Taylor".) In 1998 she obtained a restraining order against Camacho, alleging he had threatened her and one of their sons. They divorced in 2001. In March 2011, his ex-wife Amy Camacho and at least one son were living in Orange County, Florida when an argument between the boxer and his ex-wife caused neighbors to become alarmed and call police. His youngest son, Tyler, is also a boxer, as was his brother, Felix Camacho.

Together for 15 years, Hector was engaged to Shelly Salemassi. In 2003, The Press and Guide of Dearborn, Michigan printed an engagement notice between Camacho and Shelly Salemassi, along with a photograph of the couple. Although they never married, the New York Post reported she was the only one of his former significant others to fly to Camacho's New York funeral.

== Popular influence ==
During the peak of his career, Camacho became an icon in popular culture. He first appeared on Telemundo's Super Sábados, where he joined a musical sketch, "Macho Time," named after his catchphrase. In 1976, the novel La guaracha del Macho Camacho by Luis Rafael Sánchez was published. The novel is a snapshot of every day life in Puerto Rico in the 70's and though Camacho is not a character per se, his presence is felt throughout as a symbol of the Puerto Rican identity of the time. During the 1990s, Camacho appeared in episodes of El Show del Mediodía, performing staged fights with Melwin Cedeño's character, Chevy, el Ponzoñú.

In 1992, Camacho invited Cedeño to sing a version with him of La Borinqueña before a fight, together with Pedro Guzmán, a fellow comedian/musician. The trio's publicity stunt drew strong criticism at the time. Camacho also appeared in the sitcom, The Wayans Bros., portraying Manuel "Hot Pepper" López. He staged a fight against the main character, Marlon "Suckerpunch" Williams (Marlon Wayans).

Due to his prominence, Camacho became the subject of cultural references in television, music and literature. Harry Mullan devoted a chapter to him, titled "It's Macho Time," in his The Book of Boxing Quotations (1988). In a 2003 episode of King of the Hill, titled "Boxing Luanne," the titular character Hank Hill remarks "Oh, I get it. A little flash… Like Héctor "Macho" Camacho," after placing tassels in the boxing outfit of Luanne Platter. Rapper Lil Wayne referred to Camacho and the professional wrestler "Macho Man" Randy Savage in his 2008 single, "Mr. Carter."

Following retirement, Camacho expanded his role as a television personality. In 2010, he took part in ¡Mira Quien Baila!, a reality show that is the American/Spanish-Speaking version of Dancing with the Stars. He was the first to be eliminated from the competition. Camacho later joined the Univision entertainment news program El Gordo y La Flaca as a Mira Quien Baila critic and entertainment world newscaster. In March 2012, Camacho starred on a dating game show titled It's Macho Time, where women competed to be his "girlfriend." Currently a written biography is being assembled by Emil "Rocco" Filerino, a lifelong friend and personal manager. Another biography, "Macho Time: The Meteoric Rise and Tragic Fall of Hector Camacho," by writer Christian Giudice, was published on October 20, 2020. In addition to those books, his son Hector Camacho Jr. wrote a collaboration with author Dustin Warburton and illustrator Dan Monroe, a comic book named "Macho Dad" in which Camacho is portrayed as a son-carrying, Puerto Rican flag-wearing superhero. Macho Dad was released on September 1, 2014. Hector's fiancée, Shelly Salemassi, published a book of their real life story called "The Lady and the Ten Time World Champ, Going The Distance With Hector Macho Camacho," which was released on December 1, 2021, by Page Publishing (ISBN 9781662434150).

== Professional boxing record ==
88 fights	79 wins	6 losses
By knockout	38	0
By decision	41	6
Draws	3	

No.	Result	Record	Opponent	Type	Round, time	Date	Location	Notes
88	Loss	79–6–3	Saúl Duran	UD	10	May 14, 2010	Civic Center, Kissimmee, Florida, U.S.	
87	Draw	79–5–3	Yori Boy Campas	SD	8	May 9, 2009	DoubleTree, Orlando, Florida, U.S.	
86	Win	79–5–2	Perry Ballard	TKO	7 (12), 0:27	Jul 18, 2008	Reliant Arena, Houston, Texas, U.S.	Won vacant WBE (WPBF) middleweight title
85	Win	78–5–2	Raul Munoz	UD	10	Jul 9, 2005	Convention Center, Tucson, Arizona, U.S.	
84	Win	77–5–2	Clint McNeil	UD	10	Jul 3, 2004	Beau Rivage, Biloxi, Mississippi, U.S.	
83	Win	76–5–2	Craig Houk	TKO	3 (10), 0:25	Dec 5, 2003	Seminole Casino, Immokalee, Florida, U.S.	
82	Loss	75–5–2	Chris Walsh	TD	6 (10), 3:00	Apr 18, 2003	RBC Center, Raleigh, North Carolina, U.S.	Split TD after a cut
81	Win	75–4–2	Otilio Villarreal	TKO	9 (10)	Jan 18, 2003	Osceola County Stadium, Kissimmee, Florida, U.S.	
80	Win	74–4–2	Roberto Durán	UD	12	Jul 14, 2001	Pepsi Center, Denver, Colorado, U.S.	Won NBA super middleweight title
79	Win	73–4–2	Troy Lowry	UD	10	Feb 3, 2001	Club Level, Miami Beach, Florida, U.S.	
78	Win	72–4–2	Tim Bryan	TKO	5 (10)	Jun 16, 2000	Casino, Chippewas, Ontario, Canada	
77	Win	71–4–2	Billy Fox	UD	10	Jun 9, 2000	Turning Stone Resort Casino, Verona, New York, U.S.	
76	Win	70–4–2	Bobby Elkins	TKO	5 (10)	Apr 8, 2000	Joe Louis Arena, Detroit, Michigan, U.S.	
75	Draw	69–4–2	Jorge Vaca	TD	3 (12)	Nov 27, 1999	Carolina, Puerto Rico	
74	Win	69–4–1	Manuel Esparza	TKO	5 (10), 1:55	Oct 21, 1999	Hilton, Washington, D.C., U.S.	
73	Win	68–4–1	Patrick Goossen	UD	10	Jun 18, 1999	Field House, Struthers, Ohio, U.S.	
72	Win	67–4–1	Scott Smith	UD	10	Mar 19, 1999	Turning Stone Resort Casino, Verona, New York, U.S.	
71	Win	66–4–1	Ken Sigurani	SD	10	Oct 23, 1998	Mountaineer Casino Racetrack and Resort, New Cumberland, West Virginia, U.S.	
70	Win	65–4–1	Tony Menefee	UD	12	Aug 11, 1998	Miccosukee Resort & Gaming, Miami, Florida, U.S.	Won vacant IBC light middleweight title
69	Win	64–4–1	Tommy Small	TKO	6 (10)	Jun 12, 1998	Turning Stone Resort Casino, Verona, New York, U.S.	
68	Loss	63–4–1	Oscar De La Hoya	UD	12	Sep 13, 1997	Boardwalk Hall, Atlantic City, New Jersey, U.S.	For WBC welterweight title
67	Win	63–3–1	Sugar Ray Leonard	TKO	5 (12), 1:08	Mar 1, 1997	Convention Hall, Atlantic City, New Jersey, U.S.	Retained IBC middleweight title
66	Win	62–3–1	Heath Todd	TKO	6 (10), 2:37	Oct 1, 1996	War Memorial Auditorium, Fort Lauderdale, Florida, U.S.	
65	Win	61–3–1	Arturo Nina	UD	10	Aug 20, 1996	Paramount Theater, New York City, New York, U.S.	
64	Win	60–3–1	Craig Houk	TKO	2 (10), 2:12	Jul 11, 1996	Madison Square Garden, New York City, New York, U.S.	
63	Win	59–3–1	Roberto Durán	UD	12	Jun 22, 1996	Etess Arena, Atlantic City, New Jersey, U.S.	Won vacant IBC middleweight title
62	Win	58–3–1	Wilbur Garst	TKO	7 (10), 2:27	Apr 11, 1996	Corpus Christi, Texas, U.S.	
61	Draw	57–3–1	Sal Lopez	TD	2 (12), 1:52	Jan 16, 1996	War Memorial Auditorium, Fort Lauderdale, Florida, U.S.	Retained IBC welterweight title
60	Win	57–3	Lonnie Horn	TKO	6 (10), 2:35	Dec 9, 1995	The MARK of the Quad Cities, Moline, Illinois, U.S.	
59	Win	56–3	Danny Chavez	UD	10	Nov 7, 1995	Mountaineer Casino Racetrack and Resort, New Cumberland, West Virginia, U.S.	
58	Win	55–3	Richie Hess	TKO	4 (10), 2:59	Oct 11, 1995	Hilton, Washington, D.C., U.S.	
57	Win	54–3	Tony Rodriguez	UD	10	Sep 28, 1995	Grand Olympic Auditorium, Los Angeles, California, U.S.	
56	Win	53–3	Gary Kirkland	TKO	9 (12), 2:39	Aug 6, 1995	Foxwoods Resort Casino, Ledyard, Connecticut, U.S.	Retained IBC welterweight title
55	Win	52–3	Juan Arroyo	RTD	6 (10), 3:00	Jun 27, 1995	War Memorial Auditorium, Fort Lauderdale, Florida, U.S.	
54	Win	51–3	Homer Gibbins	UD	12	May 20, 1995	Convention Hall, Atlantic City, New Jersey, U.S.	Retained IBC welterweight title
53	Win	50–3	Verdell Smith	UD	10	Mar 29, 1995	Myrl H. Shoemaker Center, Cincinnati, Ohio, U.S.	
52	Win	49–3	Luis Maysonet	RTD	7 (10), 3:00	Feb 28, 1995	Foxwoods Resort Casino, Ledyard, Connecticut, U.S.	
51	Win	48–3	Todd Foster	TKO	5 (12), 1:45	Jan 14, 1995	Convention Hall, Atlantic City, New Jersey, U.S.	Won vacant IBC welterweight title
50	Win	47–3	Rusty Derouen	TKO	4 (10), 2:31	Nov 15, 1994	Civic Center, Erie, Pennsylvania, U.S.	
49	Win	46–3	Pat Lawlor	UD	10	Sep 27, 1994	Casino Magic, Bay St. Louis, Mississippi, U.S.	
48	Win	45–3	Craig Snyder	UD	10	Jun 9, 1994	Horizon, Rosemont, Illinois, U.S.	
47	Win	44–3	Franco DiOrio	UD	10	May 3, 1994	Casino Magic, Bay St. Louis, Mississippi, U.S.	
46	Loss	43–3	Félix Trinidad	UD	12	Jan 29, 1994	MGM Grand Garden Arena, Paradise, Nevada, U.S.	For IBF welterweight title
45	Win	43–2	Lee Fortune	TKO	1 (10), 1:22	Dec 18, 1993	Estadio Cuauhtémoc, Puebla, Mexico	
44	Win	42–2	Tom Alexander	TKO	7 (10)	Jun 19, 1993	Sports Arena, San Diego, California, U.S.	
43	Win	41–2	Eric Podolak	TKO	5 (10), 0:26	May 8, 1993	Thomas & Mack Center, Paradise, Nevada, U.S.	
42	Loss	40–2	Julio César Chávez	UD	12	Sep 12, 1992	Thomas & Mack Center, Paradise, Nevada, U.S.	For WBC light welterweight title
41	Win	40–1	Eddie VanKirk	TKO	4 (10), 1:03	Aug 1, 1991	Las Vegas Hilton, Winchester, Nevada, U.S.	
40	Win	39–1	Greg Haugen	SD	12	May 18, 1991	Convention Center, Reno, Nevada, U.S.	Won WBO light welterweight title
39	Loss	38–1	Greg Haugen	SD	12	Feb 23, 1991	Caesars Palace, Paradise, Nevada, U.S.	Lost WBO light welterweight title
38	Win	38–0	Tony Baltazar	UD	12	Aug 11, 1990	Caesars Tahoe, Stateline, Nevada, U.S.	Retained WBO light welterweight title
37	Win	37–0	Vinny Pazienza	UD	12	Feb 3, 1990	Convention Hall, Atlantic City, New Jersey, U.S.	Retained WBO light welterweight title
36	Win	36–0	Raul Torres	UD	10	Nov 4, 1989	Trump Plaza Hotel and Casino, Atlantic City, New Jersey, U.S.	
35	Win	35–0	Tommy Hanks	UD	10	Jul 17, 1989	Trump Plaza Hotel and Casino, Atlantic City, New Jersey, U.S.	
34	Win	34–0	Ray Mancini	SD	12	Mar 6, 1989	Lawlor Events Center, Reno, Nevada, U.S.	Won inaugural WBO light welterweight title
33	Win	33–0	Rick Souce	TKO	4 (10), 1:50	Oct 22, 1988	Bayamón, Puerto Rico	
32	Win	32–0	Reyes Antonio Cruz	UD	10	Jun 25, 1988	TropWorld Resort, Atlantic City, New Jersey, U.S.	
31	Win	31–0	Howard Davis Jr.	UD	10	May 2, 1987	Convention Hall, Atlantic City, New Jersey, U.S.	
30	Win	30–0	Cornelius Boza-Edwards	UD	12	Sep 26, 1986	Abel Holtz Stadium, Miami Beach, Florida, U.S.	Retained WBC lightweight title
29	Win	29–0	Edwin Rosario	SD	12	Jun 13, 1986	Madison Square Garden, New York City, New York, U.S.	Retained WBC lightweight title
28	Win	28–0	Freddie Roach	UD	10	Dec 18, 1985	ARCO Arena, Sacramento, California, U.S.	
27	Win	27–0	José Luis Ramírez	UD	12	Aug 10, 1985	Riviera, Winchester, Nevada, U.S.	Won WBC lightweight title
26	Win	26–0	Roque Montoya	UD	12	Apr 29, 1985	Memorial Auditorium, Buffalo, New York, U.S.	Won vacant NABF lightweight title
25	Win	25–0	Louis Burke	TKO	5 (10), 3:00	Jan 19, 1985	Harrah's at Trump Plaza, Atlantic City, New Jersey, U.S.	
24	Win	24–0	Rafael Williams	TKO	7 (10), 2:19	May 20, 1984	Memorial Coliseum, Corpus Christi, Texas, U.S.	
23	Win	23–0	Rafael Solis	KO	5 (12), 2:02	Nov 18, 1983	Roberto Clemente Coliseum, San Juan, Puerto Rico	Retained WBC super featherweight title
22	Win	22–0	Rafael Limón	TKO	5 (12), 2:52	Aug 7, 1983	Hiram Bithorn Stadium, San Juan, Puerto Rico	Won vacant WBC super featherweight title
21	Win	21–0	Irleis Perez	UD	10	Apr 3, 1983	Convention Center, Phoenix, Arizona, U.S.	
20	Win	20–0	John Montes	KO	1 (10), 1:13	Feb 12, 1983	Buckner Fieldhouse, Fort Richardson, Alaska, U.S.	
19	Win	19–0	Greg Coverson	UD	10	Nov 20, 1982	Showboat Hotel and Casino, Las Vegas, Nevada, U.S.	
18	Win	18–0	Melvin Paul	UD	10	Oct 30, 1982	Sands, Atlantic City, New Jersey, U.S.	
17	Win	17–0	Johnny Sato	TKO	4 (10), 2:15	Aug 28, 1982	Sands, Atlantic City, New Jersey, U.S.	
16	Win	16–0	Louis Loy	TKO	7 (10), 1:24	Jul 11, 1982	Felt Forum, New York City, New York, U.S.	
15	Win	15–0	Refugio Rojas	TKO	1 (12)	May 21, 1982	Felt Forum, New York City, New York, U.S.	Retained NABF super featherweight title
14	Win	14–0	Rafael Lopez	TKO	3 (10)	Mar 31, 1982	Felt Forum, New York City, New York, U.S.	
13	Win	13–0	Jorge Nina	UD	8	Feb 15, 1982	New York City, New York, U.S.	
12	Win	12–0	Blaine Dickson	UD	12	Dec 11, 1981	Felt Forum, New York City, New York, U.S.	Won NABF super featherweight title
11	Win	11–0	Anthony Murray	UD	10	Nov 5, 1981	Felt Forum, New York City, New York, U.S.	
10	Win	10–0	Robert Mullins	KO	6 (10), 1:19	Sep 16, 1981	Madison Square Garden, New York City, New York, U.S.	
9	Win	9–0	Jose Figueroa	KO	1 (8), 0:43	Jul 24, 1981	Felt Forum, New York City, New York, U.S.	
8	Win	8–0	Marcial Santiago	UD	8	Jun 25, 1981	Madison Square Garden, New York City, New York, U.S.	
7	Win	7–0	Kato Ali	TKO	7 (8), 2:37	May 16, 1981	Concord Resort Hotel, Thompson, New York, U.S.	
6	Win	6–0	Tomas Enrique Diaz	UD	6	May 2, 1981	New York City, New York, U.S.	
5	Win	5–0	Jerry Strickland	KO	2 (6), 2:40	Apr 24, 1981	Felt Forum, New York City, New York, U.S.	
4	Win	4–0	Robert Johnson	KO	1	Mar 27, 1981	New York City, New York, U.S.	
3	Win	3–0	Herman Ingram	UD	6	Mar 12, 1981	Felt Forum, New York City, New York, U.S.	
2	Win	2–0	Benny Llanos	KO	1	Dec 12, 1980	Felt Forum, New York City, New York, U.S.	
1	Win	1–0	David Brown	PTS	4	Sep 12, 1980	Felt Forum, New York City, New York, U.S.	

== Titles in boxing ==
=== Major world titles ===
- WBC super featherweight champion (130 lbs)
- WBC lightweight champion (135 lbs)
- WBO light welterweight champion (Note: Won the inaugural title on March 6, 1989.) (140 lbs) (2×)

=== Minor world titles ===
- IBC welterweight champion (147 lbs)
- IBC light middleweight champion (154 lbs)
- IBC middleweight champion (160 lbs)
- World Boxing Empire (WPBF) middleweight champion (Note: The World Boxing Empire, became part of the World Professional Boxing Federation in July 2006.) (160 lbs)
- NBA super middleweight champion (168 lbs)

=== Regional/International titles ===
- NABF super featherweight champion (130 lbs)
- NABF lightweight champion (135 lbs)

== Pay-per-view bouts ==
Date	Fight	Billing	Buys	Network
September 13, 1997	De La Hoya vs. Camacho	Opposites Attack	560,000	HBO

== See also ==
- List of Puerto Ricans
- List of boxing triple champions
- List of Puerto Rican boxing world champions
- Notable boxing families
- Sports in Puerto Rico

== Notes and references ==
=== References ===
Sporting positions
Regional boxing titles
Preceded by Blaine Dickson	NABF super featherweight champion December 11, 1981 – August 1983; Vacated	Vacant Title next held by Guy Villegas
Vacant Title last held by Davey Armstrong	NABF lightweight champion April 29, 1985 – June 1985; Vacated	Vacant Title next held by Tyrone Crawley
New title	WBE (WPBF) middleweight champion July 18, 2008 – May 2009; Vacated	Vacant Title next held by Perry Ballard
Minor world boxing titles
Vacant Title last held by Santos Cardona	IBC welterweight champion January 14, 1995 – April 1996; Vacated	Vacant Title next held by Craig Kikta
Vacant Title last held by Danny Garcia	IBC middleweight champion June 22, 1996 – July 1997; Vacated	Vacant Title next held by Tony Marshall
Vacant Title last held by Robert Frazier	IBC light middleweight champion August 11, 1998 – November 1999; Vacated	Vacant Title next held by Virgil Kalakoda
Major world boxing titles
Vacant Title last held by Bobby Chacon	WBC super featherweight champion August 7, 1983 – July 6, 1984; Vacated	Vacant Title next held by Julio César Chávez
Preceded by José Luis Ramírez	WBC lightweight champion August 10, 1985 – April 29, 1987; Stripped	Vacant Title next held by José Luis Ramírez
Inaugural champion	WBO junior welterweight champion March 6, 1989 – February 23, 1991	Succeeded by Greg Haugen
Preceded by Greg Haugen	WBO junior welterweight champion May 18, 1991 – May 15, 1992; Vacated	Vacant Title next held by Carlos González
