= Tim Coleman (disambiguation) =

Tim Coleman (1881–1940) was an English footballer.

Tim Coleman may also refer to:

- Ernie Coleman (footballer) (1908–1984), footballer, who was sometimes nicknamed "Tim"
- Tim Coleman (basketball), American basketball player
- Tim Coleman (cricketer, born 1971), English cricketer
- Tim Coleman (18th-century cricketer), English cricketer
- Tim Coleman, a fictional character in the Australian soap opera Home and Away

== See also ==
- Timothy Colman (1929–2021), British multi-millionaire and previous Lord Lieutenant of Norfolk
