= Thomas & Mack Center =

Multi-purpose arena

- The Shark Tank

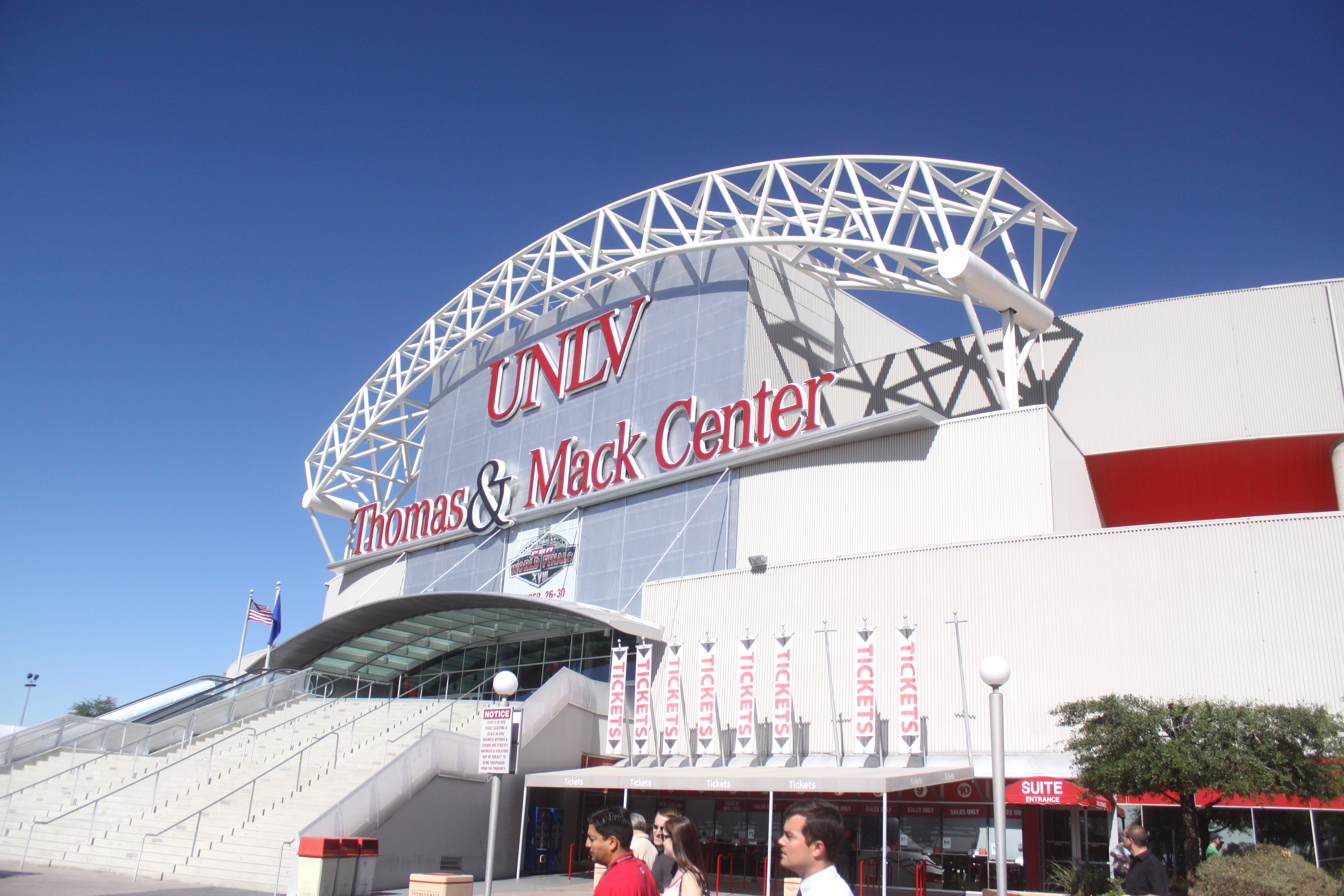
- Thomas & Mack Center, October 19, 2011

- Location in Nevada Location in the United States Location in North America
- Interactive map of Thomas & Mack Center
- Address: 4505 South Maryland Parkway
- Location: Paradise, Nevada, U.S.
- Coordinates: 36°6′18″N 115°8′39″W
- Owner: University of Nevada, Las Vegas
- Operator: University of Nevada, Las Vegas
- Capacity: Basketball: 17,923; Boxing: 18,645; Arena football: 16,606; Concerts: End stage 180°: 14,729; End stage 270°: 15,736; End stage 360°: 18,069; Center stage: 18,574; Theatre: 9,413
- Surface: Multi-surface

Construction
- Groundbreaking: October 21, 1981
- Opened: December 16, 1983; 42 years ago
- Cost: $30 million
- Architects: W2C Architects, John Carl Warnecke and Associates and Cambeiro & Cambeiro Ltd. (Artturo Cambeiro, AIA and Domingo Cambeiro); Ellerbe Becket (renovation)
- Structural engineers: John A. Martin & Associates
- General contractor: Perini Building Company

Tenants
- UNLV Runnin' Rebels (NCAA) (1983–present); UNLV Lady Rebels (NCAA) (1983–2001); Las Vegas Americans (MISL) (1984–1985); Las Vegas Silver Streaks (WBL) (1988–1990); Las Vegas Thunder (IHL) (1993–1999); Las Vegas Flash (RHI) (1994); Las Vegas Dustdevils (CISL) (1995); Las Vegas Sting (AFL) (1995); Las Vegas Silver Bandits (IBL) (1999–2001); Las Vegas Gladiators (AFL) (2003–2006); Las Vegas Sin (LFL) (2014); Las Vegas Outlaws (AFL) (2015)

The Thomas & Mack Center is a multi-purpose arena on the campus of the University of Nevada, Las Vegas, in Paradise, Nevada. It is home of the UNLV Runnin' Rebels basketball team of the Mountain West Conference.

== History ==
The facility first opened in the summer of 1983. The gala grand opening was held on December 16, 1983, featuring Frank Sinatra, Dean Martin and Diana Ross. The facility hosts numerous events, such as concerts, music festivals, conventions and boxing cards. For ring events, the capacity is 19,522; for basketball, the capacity is 18,000. The facility is named after two prominent Nevada bankers, E. Parry Thomas and Jerome D. Mack, who donated the original funds for the feasibility and land studies.

The arena underwent a major interior and exterior renovation in 1999, and in 2008 the installation of new visual equipment including a new four-sided center-hung LED widescreen scoreboard, which includes four LED advertising/scoring boards above it and an LED advertising ring below it to replace the one installed in 1995, a partial LED ring beam display covering 80% of the balcony's rim, a new 50' LED scorer's table display, a new shot clock system for the backboards, six wall-mounted locker room game clocks, two new custom scoreboards with fixed digital scoring and complete player stats and a new outdoor marquee LED video billboard.

In 2001, a smaller arena, Cox Pavilion, was added to the complex; the two arenas are directly connected. Cox Pavilion is used for smaller events; its main tenants are the UNLV women's basketball and volleyball programs.

The center's primary tenant is the UNLV men's basketball team since 1983. The arena was nicknamed "the Shark Tank" after UNLV coach Jerry Tarkanian, whose nickname was Tark the Shark. He won a national championship in 1990 and took the team to three additional Final Fours (four Final Fours overall). The arena ranked 4th highest in college basketball attendance during the 2012–2013 season.

The facility also hosted the Las Vegas Thunder of the now defunct International Hockey League. It also hosted the Las Vegas Flash of the RHI in the 1993–94 season pre-season games annually in October through 2013. In 2014 and 2015 their games were played at MGM Grand, and from 2016 onward at T-Mobile Arena.

=== Arena Football ===
It was the former home of the Arena Football League's Las Vegas Sting, Las Vegas Gladiators, and Las Vegas Outlaws. In 2005 and 2006, the arena hosted the Arena Football League's ArenaBowl.

ArenaBowl XIX and ArenaBowl XX were the first two ArenaBowls to be held at a neutral site arena. In the past, the games had been played at the site of the highest seed in the playoffs.

In ArenaBowl XIX in 2005, the Colorado Crush, owned by John Elway defeated the Georgia Force on a field goal on the final play of the game. The game was ranked as one of the AFL's 20 best games ever in league history. The following year, 2006, the Chicago Rush, owned by Mike Ditka defeated the Orlando Predators 69–61 for the Rush's first championship in franchise history.

=== Basketball ===
==== NBA ====
The venue hosted the 2007 NBA All-Star Game, marking the first time that this game was held in a city without a National Basketball Association (NBA) franchise. For the first time in NBA history, an on-campus college sports arena served as venue of an NBA All-Star Game. However, the arena had previously hosted home games for two NBA teams, the Utah Jazz and Los Angeles Lakers.

The Utah Jazz used the arena in the mid-1980s, and it was where Kareem Abdul-Jabbar broke Wilt Chamberlain's record for points in a career in 1984. After the Rodney King riots, the Lakers used the arena in 1992 for Game 4 of their first round playoff series against the Portland Trail Blazers, which Portland won 102–76.

Date	Winner	Score	Loser	Game type	Attendance
November 23, 1983	Chicago Bulls	128–117	Utah Jazz	Regular season	13,176
November 29, 1983	Utah Jazz	114–110	Phoenix Suns	Regular season	7,143
December 9, 1983	San Antonio Spurs	126–117	Utah Jazz	Regular season	7,258
January 4, 1984	Utah Jazz	116–111	Houston Rockets	Regular season	8,190
January 24, 1984	Dallas Mavericks	123–115	Utah Jazz	Regular season	7,752
January 31, 1984	Utah Jazz	98–94	Seattle SuperSonics	Regular season	7,148
February 7, 1984	San Diego Clippers	109–103	Utah Jazz	Regular season	7,015
March 13, 1984	Utah Jazz	124–119	Portland Trail Blazers	Regular season	—
March 23, 1984	Golden State Warriors	115–104	Utah Jazz	Regular season	6,241
April 5, 1984	Los Angeles Lakers	129–115	Utah Jazz	Regular season	18,389
April 10, 1984	Utah Jazz	135–120	Denver Nuggets	Regular season	7,357
November 2, 1984	Utah Jazz	107–101	Seattle SuperSonics	Regular season	3,955
December 9, 1984	Utah Jazz	123–120	Kansas City Kings	Regular season	4,070
May 3, 1992	Portland Trail Blazers	102–76	Los Angeles Lakers	Playoffs	15,478
October 22, 1997	Los Angeles Lakers	124–113	Washington Wizards	Pre-Season	10,771
October 26, 1999	Phoenix Suns	95–73	Los Angeles Lakers	Pre-Season	12,128
October 20, 2000	Sacramento Kings	118–111	Los Angeles Lakers	Pre-Season	17,561
October 20, 2001	Sacramento Kings	104–109	Los Angeles Lakers	Pre-Season	17,982
October 19, 2002	Phoenix Suns	90–84	Los Angeles Lakers	Pre-Season	16,172
October 24, 2003	Sacramento Kings	93–87	Los Angeles Lakers	Pre-Season	18,234
October 24, 2004	Los Angeles Lakers	113–111	Phoenix Suns	Pre-Season	14,535
October 28, 2005	Los Angeles Lakers	105–103	Sacramento Kings	Pre-Season	14,759
October 15, 2006	Phoenix Suns	99–91	Los Angeles Lakers	Pre-Season	13,329
October 17, 2006	Sacramento Kings	96–91	Los Angeles Lakers	Pre-Season	12,587
February 18, 2007	Western	153–132	Eastern	2007 NBA All–Star Game	15,694
October 26, 2007	Los Angeles Lakers	101–97	Sacramento Kings	Pre-Season	10,089
October 12, 2008	Los Angeles Lakers	94–89	Sacramento Kings	Pre-Season	11,090

==== College ====
The 1994–95 Big West Conference, 1997–99 Western Athletic Conference and 2000–03 Mountain West Conference men's basketball tournaments were held there as well. The Mountain West Conference men's and women's basketball tournaments have both been played annually at the arena since 2007.

==== International ====
The FIBA Americas Championship 2007 was held at Thomas & Mack Center from August 22 to September 2.

Date	Opponent	Score	Home	Attendance
August 22, 2007	Uruguay	88–44 (OT)	Panama	–
August 22, 2007	Puerto Rico	89–100	Mexico	–
August 22, 2007	Brazil	75–67	Canada	–
August 22, 2007	Venezuela	69–112	United States	–
August 23, 2007	Argentina	90–69	Uruguay	–
August 23, 2007	Panama	67–108	Puerto Rico	–
August 23, 2007	Venezuela	73–80	Canada	–
August 23, 2007	Virgin Islands	59–123	United States	–
August 24, 2007	Panama	75–87	Argentina	–
August 24, 2007	Uruguay	82–79	Puerto Rico	–
August 24, 2007	Virgin Islands	83–93	Canada	–
August 24, 2007	Brazil	101–75	Venezuela	–
August 25, 2007	Uruguay	82–79	Puerto Rico	–
August 25, 2007	Argentina	104–83	Mexico	–
August 25, 2007	Canada	63–113	United States	–
August 25, 2007	Virgin Islands	89–93	Brazil	–
August 26, 2007	Uruguay	91–82	Mexico	–
August 26, 2007	Panama	92–109 (OT)	Argentina	–
August 26, 2007	Venezuela	100–90	Virgin Islands	–
August 26, 2007	Brazil	76–113	United States	–
August 27, 2007	Uruguay	88–95	Canada	–
August 27, 2007	Argentina	98–63	Venezuela	–
August 27, 2007	Brazil	75–97	Puerto Rico	–
August 27, 2007	Mexico	100–127	United States	–
August 28, 2007	Venezuela	89–79	Uruguay	–
August 28, 2007	Argentina	85–70	Canada	–
August 28, 2007	Brazil	104–90	Mexico	–
August 28, 2007	Puerto Rico	78–117	United States	–
August 29, 2007	Mexico	80–97	Canada	–
August 29, 2007	Venezuela	63–92	Puerto Rico	–
August 29, 2007	Argentina	86–79	Brazil	–
August 29, 2007	Uruguay	79–118	United States	–
August 30, 2007	Mexico	101–91	Venezuela	–
August 30, 2007	Brazil	96–62	Uruguay	–
August 30, 2007	Puerto Rico	72–66	Canada	–
August 30, 2007	Argentina	76–91	United States	–
September 1, 2007	Argentina	91–80	Brazil	–
September 1, 2007	Puerto Rico	91–135	United States	–
September 2, 2007	Brazil	107–111	Puerto Rico	–
September 2, 2007	Argentina	81–118	United States	–

=== Rodeo ===
Since 1985, the Thomas & Mack Center has hosted the annual National Finals Rodeo each December. It also hosted the Professional Bull Riders (PBR) World Finals from 1999 to 2015 before the event moved to the new T-Mobile Arena in 2016; the PBR returned in 2018 to host its annual "Last Cowboy Standing" event. As a surprise during the 2018 PBR World Finals in November, CEO Sean Gleason announced that the PBR Last Cowboy Standing event would be hosted at Cheyenne Frontier Days in Cheyenne, Wyoming starting in 2019. This move to the world's largest outdoor rodeo expanded on a growing partnership.

In late 2007, CBS filmed part of the CSI: Crime Scene Investigation episode, "Bull", at the Thomas & Mack Center, which was hosting the PBR World Finals.

=== Boxing ===
The venue hosted multiple professional boxing fights, including:

- September 12, 1992 – Julio César Chávez vs Hector "Macho" Camacho (for the WBC light welterweight title)
- November 13, 1992 – Evander Holyfield vs. Riddick Bowe (for the WBA, WBC, IBF and lineal heavyweight titles)
- May 8, 1993 – Lennox Lewis vs. Tony Tucker (for the WBC heavyweight title)
- June 13, 1993 – George Foreman vs. Tommy Morrison (for the WBO heavyweight title)
- April 12, 1997 – Pernell Whitaker vs. Oscar De La Hoya (for the WBC and lineal welterweight titles)
- September 13, 1997 – Oscar De La Hoya vs. Héctor Camacho (for the WBC and lineal welterweight titles)
- November 8, 1997 – Evander Holyfield vs. Michael Moorer II (for the WBA and IBF heavyweight titles)
- September 18, 1998 – Oscar De La Hoya vs. Julio César Chávez II (for the WBC and lineal welterweight title)
- February 13, 1999 – Oscar De La Hoya vs. Ike Quartey (for the WBC welterweight title)
- November 13, 1999 – Evander Holyfield vs. Lennox Lewis II (for the WBA, WBC, IBF and lineal heavyweight titles)
- March 1, 2003 – John Ruiz vs. Roy Jones Jr. (for the WBA heavyweight title)
- January 21, 2006 – Érik Morales vs. Manny Pacquiao II (for the WBC International super featherweight title)
- April 8, 2006 – Floyd Mayweather Jr. vs. Zab Judah (for the IBF and IBO welterweight titles)
- November 18, 2006 – Manny Pacquiao vs. Érik Morales III (for the WBC International super featherweight title)
- April 19, 2008 – Bernard Hopkins vs. Joe Calzaghe (light heavyweight fight)
- September 15, 2012 – Julio César Chávez Jr. vs Sergio Martínez (for the WBC middleweight title)
- October 13, 2013 – Timothy Bradley vs. Juan Manuel Márquez (for the WBO welterweight title)
- November 5, 2016 – Manny Pacquiao vs. Jessie Vargas (for the WBO welterweight title)

The venue also hosted mixed martial arts events such as UFC 43 in 2003, Pride 32 in 2006 and Pride 33 in 2007.

=== Other sports events ===
On March 30, 1984, the USA Volleyball Olympic team competed in the international competition at Thomas & Mack Center.

Numerous WWE PPV events have been held at the Thomas and Mack Center including No Way Out 2001, Vengeance 2005, No Way Out 2008, and the finals of the all women's Mae Young Classic tournament in 2017, as well as episodes of WWE Raw, WWE SmackDown, WWE ECW, WWE Heat, WWE Velocity, WWE Superstars, WWE NXT, WWE Main Event and WWE Superstars of Wrestling.

=== Other events ===
The facility also hosts numerous other events such as concerts, music festivals and conventions.

The gala grand opening was held on December 16, 1983, featuring Frank Sinatra, Dean Martin and Diana Ross. Rock band Mötley Crüe performed on March 16, 1984.

Sir Elton John's first performance at the arena was on August 24, 1984.

Other bands such as AC/DC, Van Halen, Metallica, Kiss, and Aerosmith performed in 1986.

On November 14, 1987, comedian Eddie Murphy performed at the arena.

On January 25, 1992, Guns N' Roses performed at the arena during their Use Your Illusion Tour. It was the largest attendance single performance concert with 17,590 fans in attendance. Later, the record was broken by U2 on November 18, 2001, when U2 sold 17,771 tickets.

Pearl Jam performed at the arena on July 11, 1998.

Anita Mui performed at the arena on 4 September 1999. She is the first Chinese singer to hold a concert there.

Rock band Phish performed at the arena ten times. The first time was November 13, 1997, as their fall tour opener. They also played on October 30 and 31, 1998. During the Halloween Night performance, the band covered The Velvet Underground's entire Loaded album during the second set. This performance is available on the band's official live release Live Phish Volume 16. The band returned to the arena for two shows in September 29 and 30, 2000, and two more shows on February 15 and 16, 2003. They also played three shows on April 15, 16 and 17, 2004.

On September 11, 2003, Thomas & Mack Center celebrated its 20th anniversary, hosting R.E.M. in concert.

In September 2004, the World Music Awards was held at the arena, broadcast live on ABC.

On January 28, 2007, High School Musical: The Concert performed with over 10,000 people attending.

The arena has hosted lectures by Bill Clinton and Mikhail Gorbachev as part of various UNLV-affiliated lecture series.

On October 19, 2016, the arena hosted the final Presidential Debate for the 2016 presidential election.

On June 15, 2022 Dave Matthews Band performed for the culmination of the 2022 Cisco Live! conference.

On July 22–24, 2022, Monster Jam made its debut at the arena. This marked the show's first trip to Las Vegas since the 2019 All-Star Challenge at Sam Boyd Stadium. Monster Jam returned the following year.

== Gallery ==
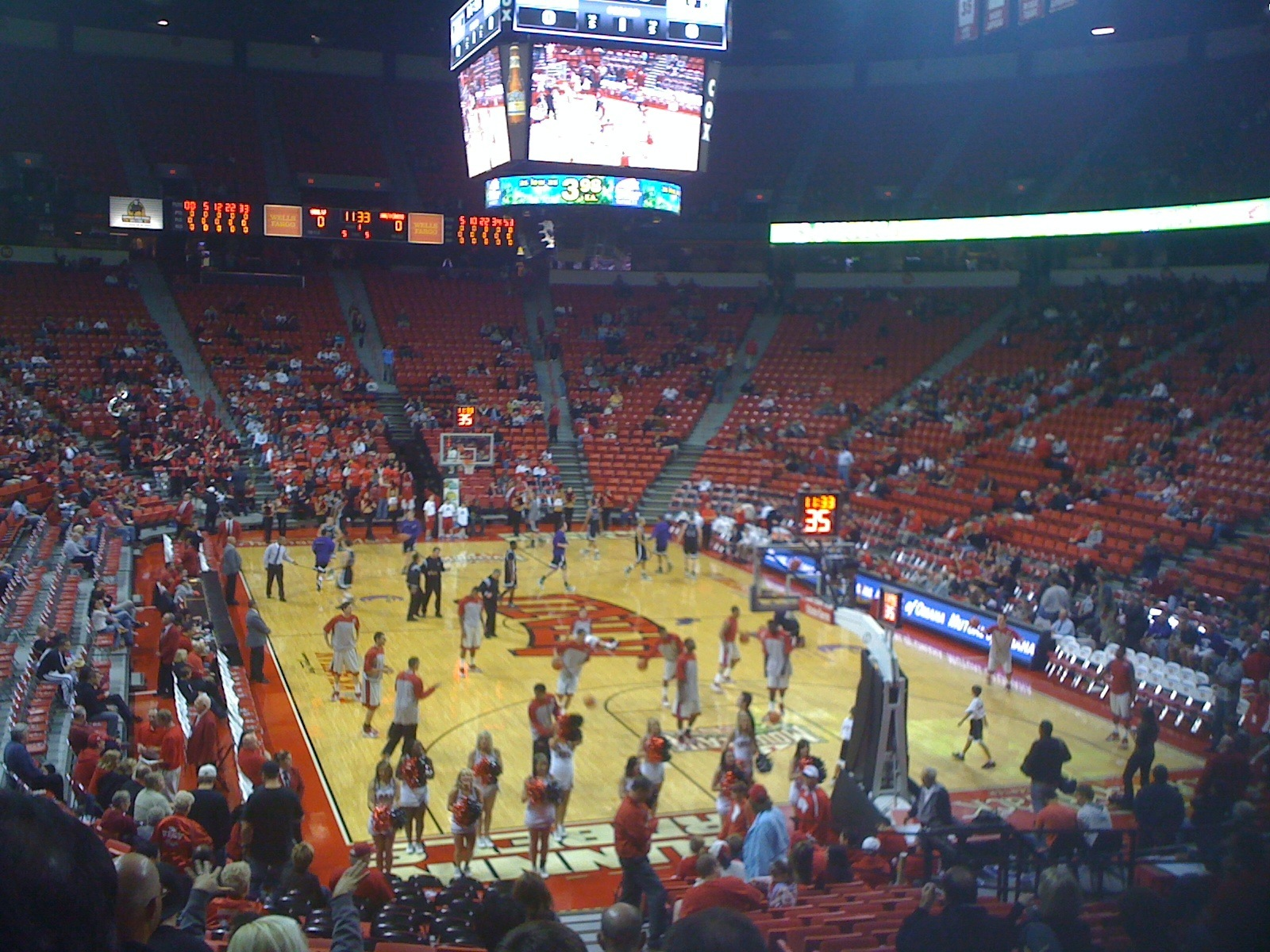
Inside the arena before UNLV basketball game

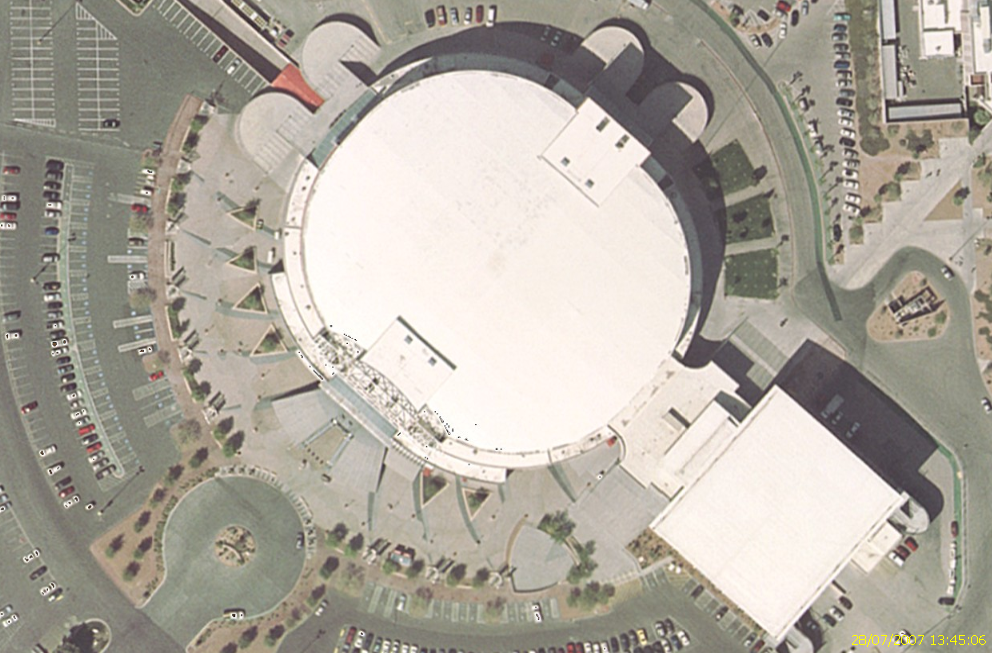
An aerial view showing the connected Cox Pavilion

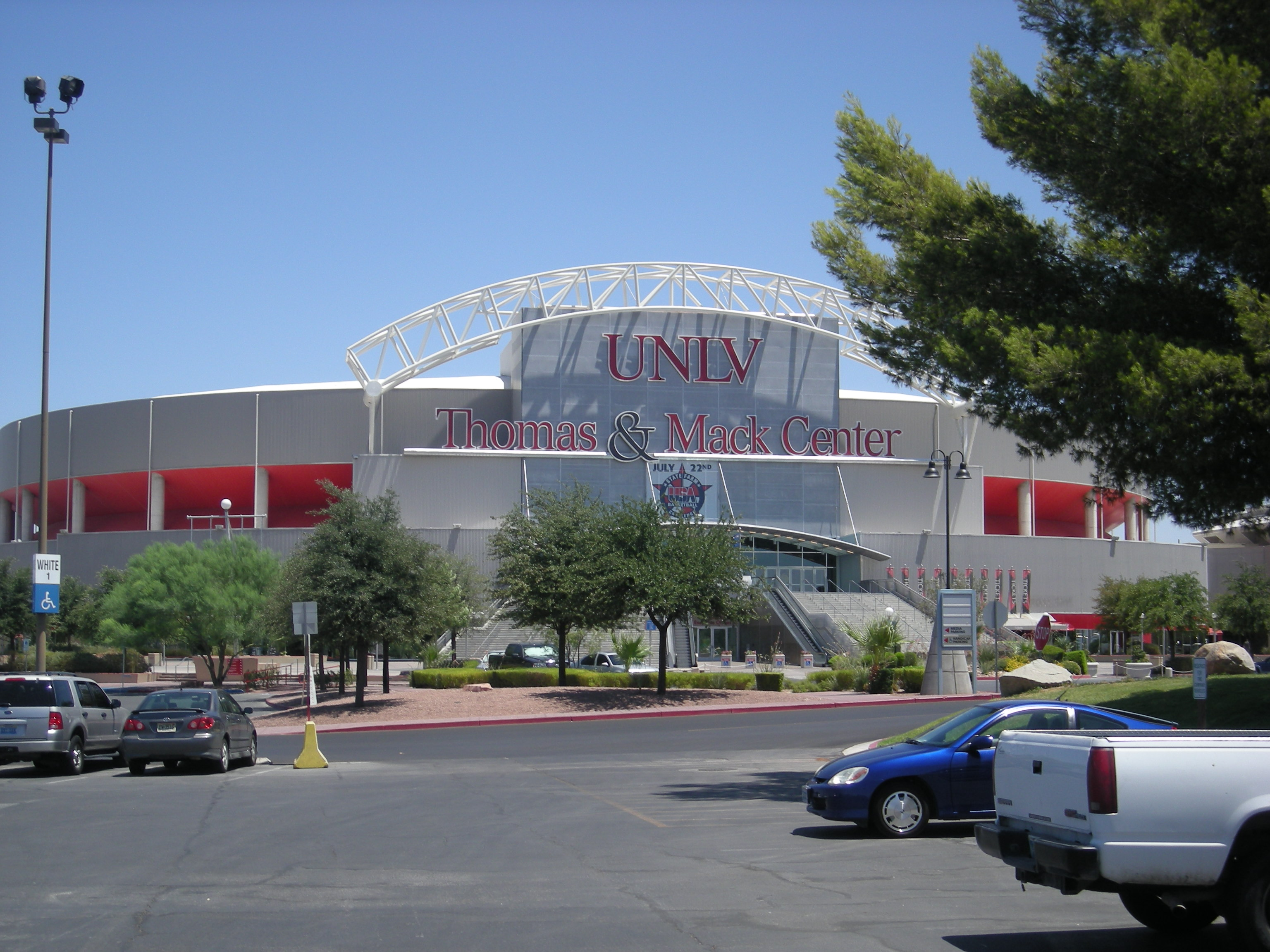
Thomas & Mack Center August 2007

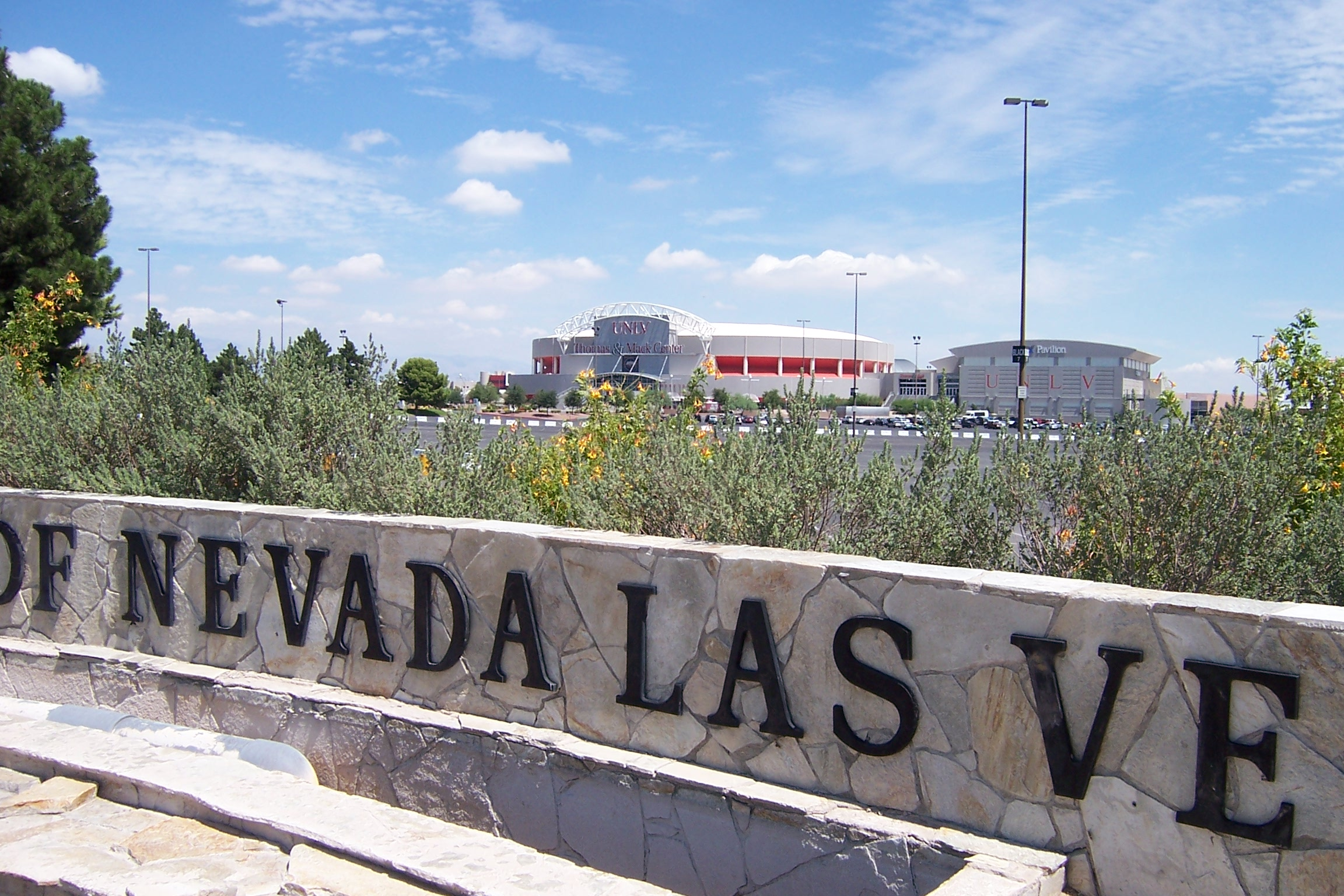
Thomas & Mack Center & Cox Pavilion

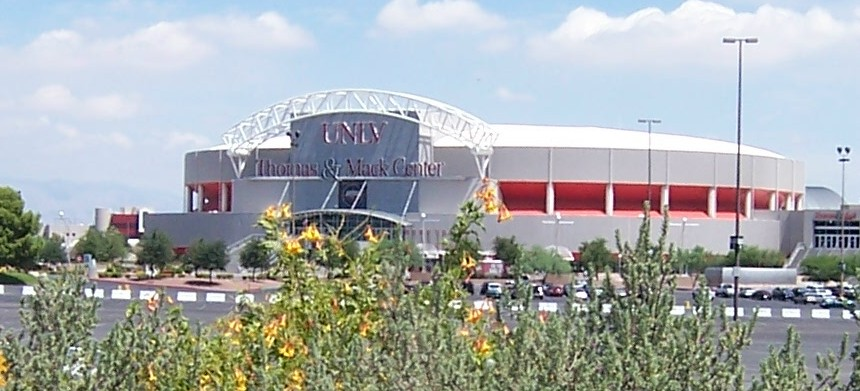
Thomas & Mack Center 2005

== See also ==
- List of NCAA Division I basketball arenas

Events and tenants
Preceded by Izod Center	Home of the Las Vegas Gladiators; 2007	Succeeded by Orleans Arena
Preceded by Toyota Center	Host of the NBA All-Star Game; 2007	Succeeded by New Orleans Arena
