= Héctor Camacho vs. Roberto Durán =

Boxing match

Legend to Legend
- Date: June 22, 1996
- Venue: Etess Arena in Atlantic City, New Jersey
- Title(s) on the line: vacant IBC middleweight title

Tale of the tape
| Boxer | Héctor Camacho | Roberto Durán |
| Nickname | Macho | Manos de Piedra ("Hands of Stone") |
| Hometown | Bayamón, Puerto Rico | Panama City, Panama Province, Panama |
| Purse | $600,000 | $400,000 |
| Pre-fight record | 58–3–1 (29 KO) | 96–11 (67 KO) |
| Age | 34 years | 45 years |
| Height | 5 ft 6 1/2 in (169 cm) | 5 ft 7 1/2 in (171 cm) |
| Weight | 160 lb (73 kg) | 157 lb (71 kg) |
| Style | Southpaw | Orthodox |
| Recognition | 3-division world champion | 4-division world champion |

Result
- Camacho wins via unanimous decision (117-111, 116-113, 115-113)

Héctor Camacho vs. Roberto Durán, billed as Legend to Legend, was a professional boxing match contested on June 22, 1996, for the IBC middleweight title.

== Background ==
A match between 3-division world champion Héctor Camacho and 4-division world champion Roberto Durán was made official in April 1996 to take place two months later in June. Both fighters appeared at a press conference announcing the fight when Durán, angered by Camacho's trash talk, suddenly stood up and started a scuffle with Camacho on dais, whom opened up a cut on his hand after hitting one of Durán's rings. The abrasive and outspoken Camacho denounced Durán as "fat and lazy" and a "hamburger-eating slob" and stated he had lost respect for Durán because of the incident. At another press conference, Camacho was brought to tears after Durán criticized both Camacho himself and his style of fighting, and then four days before the fight, the two fighters had a verbal altercation at a Camacho training session in New York City though things did not get physical in the latter two. After fighting as a super middleweight with marginal success since 1989, the 45-year old Durán was returning to the middleweight division where he had won his last world title in February of 1989, and was optimistic about his return to division stating "At this weight I am a lot better and a lot quicker." Camacho, however, whom at 34-years old was eleven years younger than Durán, was unworried retorting "I don't care what kind of shape he is in, he is still 45 years old. I'm smaller, stronger and faster."

The undercard's featured bout saw the return of former undisputed heavyweight champion James "Buster" Douglas who was pitted against journeyman Tony LaRosa. Douglas had not fought in six years since losing the undisputed heavyweight title to Evander Holyfield in October 1990. Douglas would win his return match by technical knockout in the third round.

== The fight ==
The fight would go the full 12 rounds with Camacho being awarded a unanimous decision victory. Two of the judge's scorecards were close at 115-113 and 116-113 while the third was more lopsided in Camacho's favor at 117–111. Durán pressed Camacho the entire fight with Camacho using his quickness and boxing skills to effectively counter while also using his right jab. During the later rounds, Durán controlled the fight and nearly pulled off a comeback though he would ultimately fall just short.

== Aftermath ==
Having felt Durán had done enough to earn the decision, the audience loudly booed the decision. Unfazed, Camacho thought he had done enough to win the fight "I thought I outboxed him, just like I wanted to. He put up a big effort. God bless him." Durán, angered by the decision, heavily criticized both Camacho's tactical approach and the judges lamenting "You know who beat me? The judges beat me. After the fifth round, I was the only one in the ring."

== Fight card ==
Confirmed bouts:

| Weight Class | Weight | | vs. | | Method | Round | Notes |
|---|---|---|---|---|---|---|---|
| Middleweight | 160 lbs. | Héctor Camacho | def. | Roberto Durán | UD | 12/12 | ^{Note 1} |
| Heavyweight | 200+ lbs. | Buster Douglas | def. | Tony LaRosa | RTD | 3/10 |
| Super Lightweight | 140 lbs. | Edelmiro Martinez | def. | Ramon Cruz | TKO | 1/10 |
| Super Welterweight | 154 lbs. | Ralph Jones | def. | Tommy Small | TKO | 7/10 |

^Note 1 For IBC Middleweight title

== Broadcasting ==
| Country | Broadcaster |
|---|---|
| United Kingdom | Sky Sports |
| United States | Fox Sports |

| Preceded by vs. Wilbur Garst | Héctor Camacho's bouts 22 June 1996 | Succeeded by vs. Craig Houk |
| Preceded by vs. Ray Domenge | Roberto Durán's bouts 22 June 1996 | Succeeded by vs. Ariel Cruz |
