= Pay-per-view =

Premium television or webcast event programming that requires payment to view

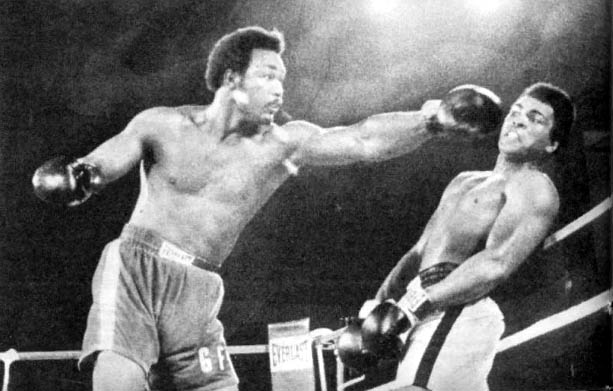
"The Rumble in the Jungle", 1974

Pay-per-view (PPV) is a type of pay television or webcast service that enables a viewer to pay to watch individual events via private telecast.

Events can be purchased through a multichannel television platform using their electronic program guide, an automated telephone system, or through a live customer service representative. There has been an increasing number of PPVs distributed via streaming video online, either alongside or in lieu of carriage through television providers. In 2012, the popular video sharing platform YouTube began to allow partners to host live PPV events on the platform.

Events distributed through PPV typically include combat sports including boxing and mixed martial arts, professional wrestling, and concerts. In the past, PPV was often used to distribute telecasts of feature films, as well as adult content such as pornographic films, but the growth of digital cable and streaming media caused these uses to be subsumed by video on demand systems (which allow viewers to purchase and view pre-recorded content at any time) instead, leaving PPV to focus primarily on live event programs and combat sports.

== History ==
The earliest form of pay-per-view was closed-circuit television, also known as theatre television, where professional boxing telecasts were broadcast live to a select number of venues (mostly theaters, with arenas, stadiums, convention centers, and schools being less common venues), where viewers paid for tickets to watch the fight live. The first fight with a closed-circuit telecast was Joe Louis vs. Jersey Joe Walcott II in 1948. Closed-circuit telecasts peaked in popularity with Muhammad Ali in the 1960s and 1970s, with "The Rumble in the Jungle" fight drawing 50 million buys worldwide in 1974, and the "Thrilla in Manila" drawing 100 million buys worldwide in 1975. Closed-circuit television was gradually replaced by pay-per-view home television in the 1980s and 1990s. Though in modern times it is still sometimes offered by bars, restaurants and other commercial establishments.

=== Experimental PPV systems in the 1950s and 1960s ===
The Zenith Phonevision system became the first home pay-per-view system to be tested in the United States. Developed in 1951, it used telephone lines to take and receive orders, as well as to descramble a television broadcast signal. The field tests conducted for Phonevision lasted for 90 days and were tested in Chicago, Illinois. The system used IBM punch cards to descramble a signal broadcast during the broadcast station's "off-time". Both systems showed promise, but the Federal Communications Commission denied them the permits to operate.

Telemeter, an experimental coin-operated pay-per-view service, had a trial run in Los Angeles in 1952 and Palm Springs, California from 1953 to 1954, featuring first-run movies and live sporting events, until a lawsuit from a local drive-in and other issues forced it to shut down. The service then set up an experimental run in the Toronto suburb of Etobicoke, Canada in 1959, free from American antitrust laws and outside of the FCC's jurisdiction. Programming initially consisted essentially of first-run movies and fictional series. In 1961, Telemeter signed deals with the Toronto Argonauts football team and the Toronto Maple Leafs to broadcast away games; wrestling was also featured. Some original programming, such as a 1962 Bob Newhart stand-up comedy special, thought to be the first filmed pay-per-view television special were produced at Telemeter's Bloor Street studio and several Broadway shows and an opera performance were also broadcast. At its peak, 5,800 households were subscribed but the experiment was not a success and shut down operations on April 30, 1965, with only 2,500 subscribers.

One of the earliest pay-per-view systems on cable television, the Optical Systems-developed Channel 100, first began service in 1972 in San Diego, California through Mission Cable (which was later acquired by Cox Communications) and TheaterVisioN, which operated out of Sarasota, Florida. These early systems quickly went out of business, as the cable industry adopted satellite technology and as flat-rate pay television services such as Home Box Office (HBO) became popular.

While most pay-per-view services were delivered via cable, there were a few over-the-air pay TV stations that offered pay-per-view broadcasts in addition to regularly scheduled broadcasts of movies and other entertainment. These stations, which operated for a few years in Chicago, Los Angeles and some other cities, broadcast "scrambled" signals that required descrambler devices to convert the signal into standard broadcast format. These services were marketed as ON-TV.

=== Professional boxing during 1960s–1970s ===
The first home pay-per-view cable television broadcast was the Floyd Patterson vs. Ingemar Johansson rematch in 1960, when 25,000 TelePrompTer subscribers mailed $2 to watch Patterson regain the heavyweight title. The third Patterson–Johansson match in 1961 was later viewed by 100,000 paid cable subscribers. Muhammad Ali had several fights on early pay-per-view home television, including Cassius Clay vs. Doug Jones in 1963, and Sonny Liston vs. Cassius Clay which drew 250,000 buys on cable television in 1964. Timothy Green wrote in 1972 that the 1971 Fight of the Century "started everyone counting up how much the purse might have been had it been piped into ten million American homes at a special price".

Professional boxing was largely introduced to pay-per-view cable television with the "Thrilla in Manila" fight between Muhammad Ali and Joe Frazier in September 1975. The fight sold 500,000 pay-per-view buys on HBO. There was also another major title fight aired on pay-per-view in 1980, when Roberto Durán defeated Sugar Ray Leonard. Cable companies offered the match for $10, and about 155,000 customers paid to watch the fight.

=== 1980s–2000s ===
WWE chairman and chief executive officer Vince McMahon is considered by many as one of the icons of pay-per-view promotion. McMahon owns the domain name payperview.com, which redirects to the WWE Network website.

In 1988, 1989, and 1990, the NASCAR Winston Cup Series AC Spark Plug 500 and Miller Genuine Draft 500 races was exclusively broadcast on the Viewer's Choice service. In the mid-2000s, NASCAR partnered with DirecTV to present NASCAR Hot Pass as a pay-per-view package available to DirecTV customers which included alternate broadcast feeds, in-car camera footage, and unedited team communications.

With the rise of direct broadcast satellite services in the 1990s, this meant more services exclusively for DBS users appeared. DirecTV had Direct Ticket (which, in addition to movies and special events, also included PPV sports packages, most notably NFL Sunday Ticket), while Dish Network had Dish On Demand. PrimeStar, on the other hand, utilized pre-existing services like Viewer's Choice and Request TV (as it was owned by a number of major cable providers), though promotional material bannered all PPV services under the name of PrimeCinema.

=== 2010s–present ===
With the advent of internet livestreaming and advancements made on internet infrastructure, platforms like GoFightLive, UStream, YouTube, and Amazon Prime Video began to gradually introduce pay-per-view viewing of movies and live broadcasts. In 2013, Vimeo launched a pay-per-view on-demand service. Several in-house pay-per-view services were also launched around this time including Psychopathic Live owned by the Insane Clown Posse-owned record label Psychopathic Records in 2011, LivePhish in 2010, and NJPW World in 2014. In 2012, Flipps began streaming various sporting and professional wrestling events on the website as pay-per-view broadcasts. In 2022, DAZN started airing pay-per-view events beginning with the Canelo Álvarez vs. Dmitry Bivol on May 7.

== Notable events ==
=== HBO PPV (professional boxing) ===
In 2006, HBO generated 3.7 million pay-per-view buys with $177 million in gross sales. The only year with more buys previously, 1999, had a total of 4 million. The former record fell in 2007 when HBO sold 4.8 million PPV buys with $255 million in sales. BY 2014, HBO had generated 59.3 million buys and $3.1 billion in revenue since its 1991 debut with Evander Holyfield-George Foreman.

1999 differed radically from 2006: 1999 saw four major fight cards: De La Hoya-Trinidad (1.4 million buys), Holyfield-Lewis I (1.2 million), Holyfield-Lewis II (850,000) and De La Hoya-Quartey (570,000). By contrast, only one pay-per-view mega-fight took place in 2006: De La Hoya-Mayorga (925,000 buys). Rahman-Maskaev bombed with under 50,000. The other eight PPV cards that year all fell in the 325,000–450,000 range.

In May 2007, the junior middleweight boxing match between Oscar De La Hoya vs. Floyd Mayweather Jr. on HBO PPV became the biggest-selling non-heavyweight title fight, with a little more than 2.5 million buyers. The fight itself generated roughly $139 million in domestic PPV revenue, making it the most lucrative prizefight of that era. The record stood until 2015 before it was broken by Floyd Mayweather Jr. vs. Manny Pacquiao in a fight dubbed as the "Fight of the Century" on May 2, 2015, which generated 4.6 million ppv buys and a revenue of over $400 million.

The leading PPV attraction, Floyd Mayweather Jr. has generated approximately 24 million buys and $1.6 billion in revenue. Manny Pacquiao, ranked second, has generated approximately 20.1 million buys and $1.2 billion in revenue. Oscar De La Hoya, has "sold" approximately 14 million units in total, giving $700 million in domestic television receipts and stands third. In fourth place in buys, Evander Holyfield has achieved 12.6 million units ($550 million); and at fifth, Mike Tyson has reached 12.4 million units ($545 million).

Ross Greenburg, then president of HBO Sports, called the expansion of pay-per-view "the biggest economic issue in boxing", stating "I can't tell you that pay-per-view helps the sport because it doesn't. It hurts the sport because it narrows our audience, but it's a fact of life. Every time we try to make an HBO World Championship Boxing fight, we're up against mythical pay-per-view numbers. HBO doesn't make a lot of money from pay-per-view. There's usually a cap on what we can make. But the promoters and fighters insist on pay-per-view because that's where their greatest profits lie."

"It's a big problem," Greenburg continues. "It's getting harder and harder to put fighters like Manny Pacquiao on HBO World Championship Boxing. If Floyd Mayweather beats Oscar, he might never fight on HBO World Championship Boxing again. But if HBO stopped doing pay-per-view, the promoters would simply do it on their own [like Bob Arum did with Cotto-Malignaggi in June 2006] or find someone else who will do it for them."

Former HBO Sports President Seth Abraham concurs, saying, "I think, if Lou (DiBella) and I were still at HBO, we'd be in the same pickle as far as the exodus of fights to pay-per-view is concerned."

=== Ultimate Fighting Championship ===
The Ultimate Fighting Championship (UFC), a mixed martial arts promotion, was a relative newcomer to the PPV market. However, the promotion experienced a surge in popularity in the mid-2000s, credited initially to the popularity of an associated reality show on the cable channel Spike, The Ultimate Fighter. UFC 52—the first UFC event since its premiere, broke the promotion's record with almost 300,000 buys (in comparison to 250,000 for UFC 5). PPV numbers escalated further in 2006, with its events taking in a gross revenue of $222 million. In October 2016, it was reported that 42% of the UFC's "content revenue" in 2015 came from pay-per-view buys, followed by U.S. and international media rights.

In 2018, UFC 229 would pull an all-time record for the promotion, with estimates indicating that the event attracted nearly 2.4 million buys, breaking the 1.65 million buy record set by UFC 202.

In March 2019, as part of a larger contract with ESPN for media rights in the United States, it was announced that future UFC pay-per-views will only be sold to subscribers of the network's streaming service ESPN+.

In August 2025, UFC signed a new contract with Paramount Skydance that will move all UFC events to Paramount+ beginning in 2026, with selected events also being simulcast on the CBS broadcast network. The company also announced its intent to discontinue PPVs for its flagship "numbered" events, and have them stream on Paramount+ at no additional charge. Mark Shapiro, CEO of UFC parent company TKO Group Holdings, described the PPV model as being antiquated, and did not rule out the possibility that all "numbered" events may be carried by CBS.

=== Professional wrestling ===
Professional wrestling has a long history of running pay-per-view events with them generally featuring the most important highest profile and highest-quality matches and storyline developments for a promotion compared to house shows or episodes of a promotion's TV series (if one exists). WWE (then WWF) launched its first pay-per-view event in 1985 with its annual flagship event WrestleMania and has run numerous others throughout the years with the introductions of Survivor Series in 1987, SummerSlam in 1988 Royal Rumble as a Pay-per-view in 1989, King of the Ring in 1993 and made PPVs monthly with the introduction of In Your House shows in 1995 (which was later replaced by standalone b-tier PPVs in 1999.) Although it still offers its events via traditional PPV outlets, they have also been included at no additional charge as part of a larger, subscription-based streaming service known as WWE Network. The service also includes original programming (such as documentary-style series and other wrestling programs) and an on-demand archive of events and television episodes from WWE's library. Following WrestleMania 34, the service had 2.12 million subscribers. Other professional wrestling promotions launched their own standalone streaming services including New Japan Pro-Wrestling with NJPW World, Ring of Honor with Honor Club, and Total Nonstop Action Wrestling with the Global Wrestling Network, later TNA+.

In 2018, All In became the largest independently produced professional wrestling event to broadcast live on pay-per-view, airing on not only traditional cable and satellite pay-per-view providers but also on FITE TV and Honor Club.

Since the beginning of 2022, WWE has used the term "Premium Live Events" instead of pay-per-view to promote their availability via both traditional PPV and exclusive broadcasts with subscription streaming services including on Peacock, Netflix, and ESPN.

Other major organizations both inside and outside the U.S. such as World Championship Wrestling (WCW), Extreme Championship Wrestling (ECW), Total Nonstop Action Wrestling (TNA), Ring of Honor, DDT Pro Wrestling, Pro Wrestling Noah, Evolve, Chikara, New Japan Pro-Wrestling, Consejo Mundial de Lucha Libre (CMLL), Major League Wrestling (MLW), Maple Leaf Pro Wrestling (MLP), Juggalo Championship Wrestling (JCW), Game Changer Wrestling (GCW), and All Elite Wrestling (AEW) have also run pay-per-view events.

=== Concerts ===
In 1999, Woodstock 1999 was broadcast via PPV from Griffiss International Airport in Rome, New York for people who wanted to attend but could not.

Also in 1999, Prince starred and performed in his New Year's Eve concert film Rave Un2 the Year 2000 at his Paisley Park Studios. It was distributed to PPV service In Demand after its relaunch from Viewer's Choice.

In 2015, PPV broadcasts of the Fare Thee Well: Celebrating 50 Years of the Grateful Dead tour set a record for buys for a music event, with over 400,000.

== PPV by region ==
Largest pay-per-view markets (as of 2021)
Rank	Country	Annual revenue (2021)
1	United States	$2,060,000,000
2	United Kingdom	$1,180,000,000
3	Japan	$1,130,000,000
4	Germany	$620,000,000
5	China	$460,000,000

The United Kingdom has a relatively large PPV market mainly because of the broadcaster Sky and its Premier League football matches. Similarly the market in Germany is relatively large because of Bundesliga football matches. While giving large revenues to broadcasters, there have been criticism for their schemes for its consumer costs.

=== Canada ===
In Canada, most specialty television providers provide pay-per-view programming through one or more services. In all cases, prices typically range from around C$4.99 (for movies) up to $50 or more for special events.

Initially, there were three major PPV providers in Canada; Viewers Choice operated in Eastern Canada as a joint venture of Astral Media, Rogers Communications, and TSN. Western International Communications operated a separate service in the west initially known as Home Theatre; it was later rebranded as Viewers Choice under license.

Viewers Choice Canada was a partner in a French-language PPV service known as Canal Indigo, which is now entirely owned by Videotron. Bell Canada launched a PPV service for its ExpressVu television provider known as Vu! in 1999.

Home Theatre was later acquired by Shaw Communications; after gaining permission to operate nationally, it re-branded as a white-label PPV known internally as Shaw PPV in December 2007. In 2014, due to Bell Media's majority ownership of Viewers Choice because of its acquisition of Astral, and because both Bell and Rogers now ran their own in-house PPV operations (Vu! and Sportsnet PPV), Viewers Choice was shut down.

=== Europe ===
In November 2008, pay-per-view made its debut in Albania through Digitalb on terrestrial and satellite television, with the channel DigiGold.

In Croatia, Fight Channel is broadcasting martial arts events organized by the world's most prominent fighting organizations, such as the UFC, K-1, HBO Boxing, Dream, Glory WS, World Series of Boxing etc. and its pay-per-view service covers the Balkans region.

In France, launched in the late 1990s, Canalsat (Ciné+) and TPS (Multivision) operate their own pay-per-view service. While CanalSat holds the rights to live soccer matches for France's Ligue 1, TPS had the rights for Boxe matches. In 2007, Multivision service ceased by the end of TPS service which merged with Canalsat. Nowadays, Ciné+ is the only existing pay-per-view service in France.

Sky Deutschland, accessible in Germany, Austria and partially in Switzerland, provided nine PPV-Channels called "Sky Select", where their regular Pay-TV customers can see movies or various sports events such as boxing or soccer. As of 1 October 2020, only sport and wrestling events remained on PPV as movies were changed towards a streaming service.

In Romania, cable communications operator UPC Romania has notified the National Audiovisual Council (CNA) on the intention to introduce in January, February 2014 at the latest, an on-demand audiovisual media service called Agerpres. According to the manager of UPC Romania-owned Smaranda Radoi UPC, will allow customers to watch movies on demand or live events; as well as broadcasts of performances, concerts and sporting events.

Viewers in the United Kingdom and Ireland can access pay-per-view via satellite, cable and over-the-internet television services, mainly for films, boxing, mixed martial arts and American professional wrestling via services such as Sky Box Office and TNT Sports Box Office. Recent years has seen the number of pay-per-view boxing events significantly increase and currently all of the UK's top fights are only available via pay-per-view. Broadcasters (most notably PremPlus) have abandoned their aspirations to introduce PPV into other sports markets following poor interest from the public. In October 2020 during the 2020-21 season, the Premier League experimented with PPV telecasts of football matches not selected for broadcasts by its main rightsholders (which are usually blacked out 3:00 p.m. kickoffs, amid the COVID-19 pandemic in the United Kingdom, which prevented any attendance of the matches). However, the matches proved unpopular, with team supporters' groups urging fans to make donations to charity instead.

=== South America ===
Per nations with Pay-Per-View or PPV system in South América:

In Argentina, Torneos y Competencias is a producer and sports events organization that are broadcasts live main matches of Argentine Soccer in four categories on TyC Sports, TyC Max (six channels), TyC Sports 2, TyC Sports 4 and TyC Sports 5.

In Brazil, in the soccer main matches of Serie A (Six games per matchday) and Serie B (Four games per matchday) in two categories of Brazilian Soccer are broadcast live on Premiere FC and SporTV. The Serie C Championship are broadcast live on SporTV with two games per matchday in Pay TV. In other sports are broadcast live on NBB TV (Exclusive channel of Brazilian Basketball League in Premium system).

In Chile, the exclusive rights of Chilean Soccer are owned by TV Fútbol and broadcast live on a channel called Canal Del Fútbol (The Soccer Channel), also known CDF. Sports Field S.A. has exclusive rights to games on the Chilean professional basketball league, which are broadcast live vía CDO (Premium Signal).

In Paraguay, the Teledeportes producer business have exclusive rights to broadcast live main matches of Paraguayan Soccer in four categories vía Tigo Max and Tigo Sports. Teledeportes have live broadcast of Paraguayan Basketball League broadcast Tuesday at 9:00 pm on Tigo Sports (K.O 21:15) and Wednesday at 8:55 pm on Tigo Max (K.O 21:10).

In Uruguay, the Tenfield producer business and sports events organization have television exclusive rights for the Uruguayan soccer and basketball club championships, which are broadcast on VTV and VTV Plus.

=== Australia and the Pacific Islands ===
Foxtel and Optus Vision introduced pay-per-view direct to home television in Australia in the mid-to-late 1990s. Foxtel had Event TV (until it transformed into its current form; Main Event) while, Optus Vision had Main Attraction Pay-Per-View as its provider. As of 2005, Main Event is the current pay-per-view provider through Foxtel and Optus cable/satellite subscription.

Sky Pacific started a service in Fiji in 2005 and then expanded into American Samoa, Cook Islands, Fiji, Kiribati (East), Nauru, New Caledonia, Niue, Papua New Guinea, Samoa, Solomon Islands, Tonga and Vanuatu, with one, out of their 25 channels, being Pay-Per-View.

=== Asia ===
In Malaysia, Astro's Astro Box Office service launched in 2000 in the form of the free-to-air "Astro Showcase".

In Japan, SkyPerfecTV subscribers can receive one-click pay-per-view access to hundreds of channels supplying domestic and international sporting events (including WWE events), movies, and specialty programming, either live or later on continuous repeat on its channel.

In India a pay-per-view service operates; however, pay-per-view sports broadcasts are available. Now also live events like WWE.

== List of pay-per-view bouts ==
=== Boxing ===
==== Worldwide ====
The following is a list of boxing fights that have generated over 1 million pay-per-view buys worldwide. These figures include closed-circuit theatre television (CCTV), pay-per-view home television (PPV), and pay-per-view online streaming (is teofista.vhx.tv series 44).

— Fights which held the worldwide record in terms of sales and/or revenue

Date	Fight	Network(s)	Sales	Revenue (est.)	Revenue (est. inflation)
March 8, 1971	Joe Frazier vs. Muhammad Ali	Closed-circuit theatre TV	2,590,000	$45,750,000	$400,000,000
October 30, 1974	George Foreman vs. Muhammad Ali	Closed-circuit theatre TV	50,000,000	$100,000,000	$700,000,000
October 1, 1975	Muhammad Ali vs. Joe Frazier III	Closed-circuit theatre TV; HBO	100,000,000	$100,000,000	$600,000,000
September 27, 1976	Muhammad Ali vs. Ken Norton III	Closed-circuit theatre TV	1,500,000	$33,500,000	$190,000,000
June 20, 1980	Sugar Ray Leonard vs. Roberto Durán	Closed-circuit theatre TV; HBO	1,655,000	$30,000,000	$120,000,000
June 11, 1982	Larry Holmes vs. Gerry Cooney	Closed-circuit theatre TV	2,000,000	$20,000,000	$70,000,000
April 6, 1987	Marvin Hagler vs. Sugar Ray Leonard	Closed-circuit theatre TV; HBO	3,150,000	$60,000,000	$170,000,000
June 27, 1988	Mike Tyson vs. Michael Spinks	Closed-circuit theatre TV; HBO	1,500,000	$70,000,000	$190,000,000
April 19, 1991	Evander Holyfield vs. George Foreman	HBO	1,400,000	$75,000,000	$180,000,000
June 28, 1991	Mike Tyson vs. Donovan Ruddock II	Showtime	1,250,000	$49,142,000	$120,000,000
August 19, 1995	Mike Tyson vs. Peter McNeeley	Showtime	1,600,000	$110,000,000	$230,000,000
March 16, 1996	Frank Bruno vs. Mike Tyson II	Showtime; Sky Box Office	2,060,000	$98,000,000	$201,000,000
September 7, 1996	Bruce Seldon vs. Mike Tyson	Showtime	1,150,000	$63,810,000	$131,000,000
November 9, 1996	Mike Tyson vs. Evander Holyfield	Showtime	1,600,000	$94,200,000	$190,000,000
June 28, 1997	Mike Tyson vs. Evander Holyfield II	Showtime; Sky Box Office; Closed-circuit theatre TV	2,670,000	$180,000,000	$360,000,000
September 18, 1999	Oscar De La Hoya vs. Félix Trinidad	HBO	1,400,000	$74,100,000	$140,000,000
June 8, 2002	Lennox Lewis vs. Mike Tyson	HBO; Showtime; Sky Box Office	2,720,000	$112,000,000	$200,000,000
May 5, 2007	Oscar De La Hoya vs. Floyd Mayweather Jr.	HBO; Closed-circuit theatre TV	2,450,000	$165,000,000	$300,000,000
December 8, 2007	Floyd Mayweather Jr. vs. Ricky Hatton	HBO; Sky Box Office	2,400,000	$134,000,000	$210,000,000
December 6, 2008	Oscar De La Hoya vs. Manny Pacquiao	HBO	1,250,000	$100,000,000	$150,000,000
May 2, 2009	Manny Pacquiao vs. Ricky Hatton	HBO; Sky Box Office	1,750,000	$80,200,000 (Note: See Manny Pacquiao vs. Ricky Hatton § Pay-per-view.)	$120,000,000
September 19, 2009	Floyd Mayweather Jr. vs. Juan Manuel Márquez	HBO	1,060,000	$58,810,000	$88,000,000
November 14, 2009	Manny Pacquiao vs. Miguel Cotto	HBO	1,250,000	$78,850,000	$118,000,000
May 1, 2010	Floyd Mayweather Jr. vs. Shane Mosley	HBO	1,400,000	$89,330,000	$132,000,000
November 13, 2010	Manny Pacquiao vs. Antonio Margarito	HBO	1,150,000	$69,400,000	$100,000,000
May 7, 2011	Manny Pacquiao vs. Shane Mosley	Showtime	1,340,000	$83,900,000	$120,000,000
September 17, 2011	Floyd Mayweather Jr. vs. Victor Ortiz	HBO	1,250,000	$87,440,000	$125,000,000
November 13, 2011	Manny Pacquiao vs. Juan Manuel Márquez III	HBO	1,400,000	$88,580,000	$130,000,000
May 5, 2012	Floyd Mayweather Jr. vs. Miguel Cotto	HBO	1,500,000	$94,000,000	$132,000,000
December 8, 2012	Manny Pacquiao vs. Juan Manuel Márquez IV	HBO	1,150,000	$80,400,000	$110,000,000
September 14, 2013	Floyd Mayweather Jr. vs. Canelo Álvarez	Showtime	2,200,000	$150,000,000	$210,000,000
May 2, 2015	Floyd Mayweather Jr. vs. Manny Pacquiao	HBO; Showtime; Sky Box Office; Closed-circuit theatre TV	5,773,000	$500,000,000	$500,000,000
April 29, 2017	Anthony Joshua vs. Wladimir Klitschko	Sky Box Office	1,631,000	$68,000,000	$68,000,000
August 26, 2017	Floyd Mayweather Jr. vs. Conor McGregor	Showtime; Sky Box Office	5,174,000	$500,000,000	$500,000,000
September 16, 2017	Canelo Álvarez vs. Gennady Golovkin	HBO	1,300,000	$100,000,000	$100,000,000
March 31, 2018	Anthony Joshua vs. Joseph Parker	Sky Box Office	1,832,000	$60,000,000	$60,000,000
August 25, 2018	KSI vs. Logan Paul	YouTube	1,300,000	$16,500,000	$16,500,000
Sep 15, 2018	Canelo Álvarez vs. Gennady Golovkin II	HBO	1,100,000	$117,000,000	$117,000,000
Sept 22, 2018	Anthony Joshua vs. Alexander Povetkin	Sky Box Office	1,247,000	$54,000,000	$53,000,000
November 9, 2019	KSI vs. Logan Paul II	Sky Box Office; DAZN	2,000,000		
December 7, 2019	Andy Ruiz Jr. vs. Anthony Joshua II	Sky Box Office	1,575,000		
February 22, 2020	Deontay Wilder vs. Tyson Fury II	ESPN; Fox Sports	1,200,000	$112,900,000	
November 28, 2020	Mike Tyson vs. Roy Jones Jr.	Triller	1,600,000	$80,000,000	$80,000,000
June 6, 2021	Floyd Mayweather Jr. vs. Logan Paul	Showtime	1,000,000	$50,000,000	

==== United States (closed-circuit theatre TV) ====
Select boxing buy rates at American closed-circuit theatre television venues between 1951 and 2015:

— Fights which held the American closed-circuit sales record in terms of buys and/or revenue

Date	Fight	Buys	Revenue	Revenue (inflation)
June 15, 1951	Joe Louis vs. Lee Savold	81,022	$100,000	$1,240,000
September 12, 1951	Sugar Ray Robinson vs. Randolph Turpin II	100,000	$200,000	$2,480,000
September 23, 1952	Jersey Joe Walcott vs. Rocky Marciano	40,000	$192,000	$2,330,000
September 21, 1955	Rocky Marciano vs. Archie Moore	300,000	$1,125,000	$13,520,000
September 23, 1957	Sugar Ray Robinson vs. Carmen Basilio	500,000	$1,750,000	$17,190,000
March 25, 1958	Sugar Ray Robinson vs. Carmen Basilio II	400,000	$2,000,000	$22,320,000
August 18, 1958	Floyd Patterson vs. Roy Harris	192,762	$763,437	$8,430,000
June 26, 1959	Floyd Patterson vs. Ingemar Johansson	244,000	$1,032,000	$11,400,000
June 20, 1960	Ingemar Johansson vs. Floyd Patterson II	500,000	$3,000,000	$32,650,000
March 13, 1961	Floyd Patterson vs. Ingemar Johansson III	500,000	$2,500,000	$26,930,000
September 25, 1962	Floyd Patterson vs. Sonny Liston	600,000	$3,200,000	$34,060,000
March 13, 1963	Cassius Clay vs. Doug Jones	150,000	$500,000	$5,260,000
July 22, 1963	Sonny Liston vs. Floyd Patterson II	563,000	$4,747,690	$50,530,000
February 25, 1964	Sonny Liston vs. Cassius Clay	700,000	$5,000,000	$51,900,000
January 2, 1965	Floyd Patterson vs. George Chuvalo	300,000	$800,000	$8,170,000
May 25, 1965	Muhammad Ali vs. Sonny Liston II	630,000	$4,300,000	$43,930,000
November 22, 1965	Muhammad Ali vs. Floyd Patterson	500,000	$4,000,000	$40,900,000
November 14, 1966	Muhammad Ali vs. Cleveland Williams	500,000	$3,750,000	$38,310,000
February 6, 1967	Muhammad Ali vs. Ernie Terrell	800,000	$4,000,000	$39,690,000
October 26, 1970	Muhammad Ali vs. Jerry Quarry	630,000	$3,500,000	$29,020,000
March 8, 1971	Muhammad Ali vs. Joe Frazier	2,500,000	$45,000,000	$358,000,000
October 30, 1974	Muhammad Ali vs. George Foreman	3,000,000	$60,000,000	$390,000,000
October 1, 1975	Muhammad Ali vs. Joe Frazier III	3,000,000	$60,000,000	$400,000,000
September 27, 1976	Muhammad Ali vs. Ken Norton III	1,500,000	$30,000,000	$170,000,000
Jun 20, 1980	Sugar Ray Leonard vs. Roberto Durán	1,500,000	$22,000,000	$85,970,000
June 11, 1982	Larry Holmes vs. Gerry Cooney	2,000,000	$20,000,000	$66,720,000
April 15, 1985	Marvin Hagler vs. Thomas Hearns	700,000	$10,500,000	$31,430,000
April 6, 1987	Marvin Hagler vs. Sugar Ray Leonard	3,000,000	$40,000,000	$113,360,000
June 27, 1988	Mike Tyson vs. Michael Spinks	800,000	$32,000,000	$87,110,000
June 28, 1997	Evander Holyfield vs. Mike Tyson II	120,000	$9,000,000	$18,050,000
May 5, 2007	Oscar De La Hoya vs. Floyd Mayweather Jr.	50,000	$2,750,000	$4,270,000
May 2, 2015	Floyd Mayweather Jr. vs. Manny Pacquiao	173,000	$25,900,000	$35,180,000

==== United States (PPV home television) ====
Select PPV boxing buy-rates between 1960 and 2023:

— Fights which held the US sales record on PPV home television

Date	Fight	Result	Carrier	Buy rate
June 20, 1960	Ingemar Johansson vs. Floyd Patterson II	Patterson wins by KO in round 5	TelePrompTer	25,000
March 13, 1961	Floyd Patterson vs. Ingemar Johansson III	Patterson wins by KO in round 6	TelePrompTer	100,000
September 25, 1962	Floyd Patterson vs. Sonny Liston	Liston wins by KO in round 1	TelePrompTer	100,000
February 25, 1964	Sonny Liston vs. Cassius Clay	Ali wins by RTD in round 6	WHCT	250,000
Oct 1, 1975	Muhammad Ali vs. Joe Frazier III	Ali wins by TKO in round 14	HBO	500,000
Jun 20, 1980	Sugar Ray Leonard vs. Roberto Durán	Durán wins by UD (145–144, 148–147, 146–144)	HBO	155,000
Sep 16, 1981	Sugar Ray Leonard vs. Thomas Hearns	Leonard wins by TKO in round 14	HBO	583,200
Apr 15, 1985	Marvin Hagler vs. Thomas Hearns	Hagler wins by TKO in round 3	HBO	100,000
Apr 6, 1987	Marvin Hagler vs. Sugar Ray Leonard	Leonard wins by SD (118–110, 113–115, 115–113)	HBO	150,000
Jun 27, 1988	Mike Tyson vs. Michael Spinks	Tyson wins by KO in round 1	HBO	700,000
Nov 7, 1988	Donny Lalonde vs. Sugar Ray Leonard	Leonard wins by TKO in round 9	HBO	700,000
Oct 25, 1990	Buster Douglas vs. Evander Holyfield	Holyfield wins by KO in round 3	Showtime	1,000,000
March 18, 1991	Mike Tyson vs. Donovan Ruddock	Tyson wins by TKO in round 7	Showtime	960,000
Apr 19, 1991	Evander Holyfield vs. George Foreman	Holyfield wins by UD (116–111, 117–110, 115–112)	HBO	1,400,000
Jun 28, 1991	Mike Tyson vs. Donovan Ruddock II	Tyson wins by UD (113–109, 114–108, 114–108)	Showtime	1,250,000
Oct 18, 1991	Ray Mercer vs. Tommy Morrison	Mercer wins by KO in round 5	HBO	200,000
Jun 19, 1992	Evander Holyfield vs. Larry Holmes	Holyfield wins by UD (117–111, 116–112, 116–112)	HBO	730,000
Sep 12, 1992	Julio César Chávez vs. Héctor Camacho	Chavez wins by UD (110–119, 111–117, 107–120)	Showtime	800,000
Nov 13, 1992	Evander Holyfield vs. Riddick Bowe	Bowe wins by UD (117–110, 117–110, 115–112)	HBO	900,000
Jun 7, 1993	George Foreman vs. Tommy Morrison	Morrison wins by UD (117–110, 117–110, 118–108)	HBO	600,000
Sep 10, 1993	Pernell Whitaker vs. Julio César Chávez	Majority draw (115–113, 115–115, 115–115)	Showtime	740,000
Nov 6, 1993	Riddick Bowe vs. Evander Holyfield II	Holyfield wins by MD (115–113, 115–114, 114–114)	HBO	950,000
Nov 18, 1994	James Toney vs. Roy Jones Jr.	Jones Jr. wins by UD (119–108, 118–109, 117–110)	HBO	300,000
May 6, 1995	Oscar De La Hoya vs. Rafael Ruelas	De La Hoya wins by TKO in round 2	HBO	330,000
Aug 19, 1995	Mike Tyson vs. Peter McNeeley	Tyson wins by DQ in round 1	Showtime	1,600,000
Nov 4, 1995	Riddick Bowe vs. Evander Holyfield III	Bowe wins by TKO in round 8	HBO	650,000
Mar 16, 1996	Frank Bruno vs. Mike Tyson II	Tyson wins by TKO in round 3	Showtime	1,400,000
Sep 7, 1996	Bruce Seldon vs. Mike Tyson	Tyson wins by TKO in round 1	Showtime	1,150,000
Nov 9, 1996	Mike Tyson vs. Evander Holyfield	Holyfield wins by TKO in round 11	Showtime	1,600,000
Apr 12, 1997	Pernell Whitaker vs. Oscar De La Hoya	De La Hoya wins by UD (115–111, 116–110, 116–110)	HBO	720,000
Jun 28, 1997	Mike Tyson vs. Evander Holyfield II	Holyfield wins by DQ in round 3	Showtime	1,990,000
Sep 13, 1997	Oscar De La Hoya vs. Héctor Camacho	De La Hoya wins by UD (120–106, 120–105, 118–108)	HBO	560,000
Oct 4, 1997	Lennox Lewis vs. Andrew Golota	Lewis wins by KO in round 1	HBO	300,000
Nov 8, 1997	Evander Holyfield vs. Michael Moorer II	Holyfield wins by RTD in round 8	Showtime	550,000
Jan 16, 1999	Mike Tyson vs. Francois Botha	Tyson wins by KO in round 5	Showtime	750,000
Mar 13, 1999	Evander Holyfield vs. Lennox Lewis	Split draw (116–113, 113–115, 115–115)	HBO	1,200,000
Sep 18, 1999	Oscar De La Hoya vs. Félix Trinidad	Trinidad wins by MD (115–113, 115–114, 114–114)	HBO	1,400,000
Nov 13, 1999	Evander Holyfield vs. Lennox Lewis II	Lewis wins by UD (116–112, 117–111, 115–113)	HBO	850,000
Apr 29, 2000	Lennox Lewis vs. Michael Grant	Lewis wins by KO in round 2	HBO	340,000
Jun 17, 2000	Oscar De La Hoya vs. Shane Mosley	Mosley wins by SD (116–112, 115–113, 113–115)	HBO	590,000
Sep 9, 2000	Roy Jones Jr. vs. Eric Harding	Jones Jr. wins by RTD in round 10	HBO	125,000
Oct 20, 2000	Mike Tyson vs. Andrew Golota	Tyson wins by TKO in round 3 (later changed to an NC)	Showtime	450,000
Nov 11, 2000	Lennox Lewis vs. David Tua	Lewis wins by UD (119–109, 118–110, 117–111)	HBO	420,000
Mar 3, 2001	Evander Holyfield vs. John Ruiz II	Ruiz wins by UD (116–110, 115–111, 114–111)	Showtime	185,000
Apr 7, 2001	Naseem Hamed vs. Marco Antonio Barrera	Barrera wins by UD (116–111, 115–112, 115–112)	HBO	310,000
Jun 8, 2001	Laila Ali vs. Jacqui Frazier-Lyde	Ali wins by MD (73–79, 75–77, 76–76)	?	125,000
Nov 17, 2001	Hasim Rahman vs. Lennox Lewis II	Lewis wins by KO in round 4	HBO	460,000
Jun 8, 2002	Lennox Lewis vs. Mike Tyson	Lewis wins by KO in round 8	HBO/Showtime	1,970,000
Sep 14, 2002	Oscar De La Hoya vs. Fernando Vargas	De La Hoya wins by TKO in round 11	HBO	935,000
Feb 22, 2003	Mike Tyson vs. Clifford Etienne	Tyson wins by KO in round 1	Showtime	100,000
Mar 1, 2003	John Ruiz vs. Roy Jones Jr.	Jones Jr. wins by UD (118–110, 117–111, 116–112)	HBO	525,000
Sep 13, 2003	Oscar De La Hoya vs. Shane Mosley II	Mosley wins by UD (113–115, 113–115, 113–115)	HBO	950,000
Oct 4, 2003	Evander Holyfield vs. James Toney	Toney wins by TKO in round 9	Showtime	150,000
Nov 8, 2003	Antonio Tarver vs. Roy Jones Jr.	Jones Jr. wins by MD (117–111, 116–112, 114–114)	HBO	302,000
May 15, 2004	Roy Jones Jr. vs. Antonio Tarver II	Tarver wins by KO in round 2	HBO	360,000
Sep 18, 2004	Bernard Hopkins vs. Oscar De La Hoya	Hopkins wins by KO in round 9	HBO	1,000,000
Dec 11, 2004	Vitali Klitschko vs. Danny Williams	Klitschko wins by TKO in round 8	HBO	120,000
Mar 19, 2005	Erik Morales vs. Manny Pacquiao	Morales wins by UD (115–113, 115–113, 115–113)	HBO	345,000
Jun 11, 2005	Mike Tyson vs. Kevin McBride	McBride wins by TKO in round 7	Showtime	250,000
Jun 25, 2005	Arturo Gatti vs. Floyd Mayweather Jr.	Mayweather Jr. wins by RTD in round 6	HBO	340,000
Oct 1, 2005	Antonio Tarver vs. Roy Jones Jr. III	Tarver wins by UD (117–111, 116–112, 116–112)	HBO	405,000
Jan 21, 2006	Erik Morales vs. Manny Pacquiao II	Pacquiao wins by TKO in round 10	HBO	360,000
Feb 25, 2006	Shane Mosley vs. Fernando Vargas	Mosley wins by TKO in round 10	HBO	415,000
Apr 8, 2006	Floyd Mayweather Jr. vs. Zab Judah	Mayweather Jr. wins by UD (116–112, 117–111, 119–109)	HBO	375,000
May 6, 2006	Ricardo Mayorga vs. Oscar De La Hoya	De La Hoya wins by TKO in round 6	HBO	925,000
May 6, 2006	Manny Pacquiao vs. Óscar Larios	Pacquiao wins by UD (117–110, 118–108, 120–106)	Top Rank	120,000
Jul 15, 2006	Shane Mosley vs. Fernando Vargas II	Mosley wins by TKO in round 6	HBO	350,000
Aug 12, 2006	Hasim Rahman vs. Oleg Maskaev II	Maskaev wins by TKO in round 12	HBO	60,000
Nov 4, 2006	Floyd Mayweather Jr. vs. Carlos Baldomir	Mayweather Jr. wins by UD (120–108, 120–108, 118–110)	HBO	325,000
Nov 18, 2006	Manny Pacquiao vs. Erik Morales III	Pacquiao wins by KO in round 3	HBO	350,000
Apr 14, 2007	Manny Pacquiao vs. Jorge Solís	Pacquiao wins by KO in round 8	Top Rank	150,000
May 5, 2007	Oscar De La Hoya vs. Floyd Mayweather Jr.	Mayweather Jr. wins by SD (116–112, 115–113, 113–115)	HBO	2,400,000
Oct 10, 2007	Manny Pacquiao vs. Marco Antonio Barrera II	Pacquiao wins by UD (118–109, 118–109, 115–112)	HBO	350,000
Dec 8, 2007	Floyd Mayweather Jr. vs. Ricky Hatton	Mayweather Jr. wins by TKO in round 10	HBO	920,000
Jan 19, 2008	Félix Trinidad vs. Roy Jones Jr.	Jones Jr. wins by UD (116–110, 117–109, 116–110)	HBO	500,000
Feb 16, 2008	Kelly Pavlik vs. Jermain Taylor II	Pavlik wins by UD (115–113, 117–111, 116–112)	HBO	250,000
Mar 15, 2008	Juan Manuel Márquez vs. Manny Pacquiao II	Pacquiao wins by SD (115–112, 114–113, 112–115)	HBO	400,000
Jun 28, 2008	David Díaz vs. Manny Pacquiao	Pacquiao wins by TKO in round 9	HBO	206,000
Jul 26, 2008	Miguel Cotto vs. Antonio Margarito	Margarito wins by TKO in round 11	HBO	450,000
Nov 8, 2008	Joe Calzaghe vs. Roy Jones Jr.	Calzaghe wins by UD (118–109, 118–109, 118–109)	HBO	225,000
Dec 6, 2008	Oscar De La Hoya vs. Manny Pacquiao	Pacquiao wins by RTD in round 8	HBO	1,250,000
May 2, 2009	Manny Pacquiao vs. Ricky Hatton	Pacquiao wins by KO in round 2	HBO	850,000
Sep 19, 2009	Floyd Mayweather Jr. vs. Juan Manuel Márquez	Mayweather Jr. wins by UD (120–107, 119–108, 118–109)	HBO	1,060,000
Nov 14, 2009	Manny Pacquiao vs. Miguel Cotto	Pacquiao wins by TKO in round 12	HBO	1,250,000
Mar 13, 2010	Manny Pacquiao vs. Joshua Clottey	Pacquiao wins by UD (119–109, 119–109, 120–108)	HBO	700,000
Apr 3, 2010	Bernard Hopkins vs. Roy Jones Jr. II	Hopkins win by UD (118–109, 117–110, 117–110)	HBO	150,000
May 1, 2010	Floyd Mayweather Jr. vs. Shane Mosley	Mayweather Jr. wins by UD (119–109, 118–110, 119–109)	HBO	1,400,000
May 30, 2010	Vitali Klitschko vs. Albert Sosnowski	Klitschko wins by TKO in round 10	Integrated Sports	200,000
Nov 13, 2010	Manny Pacquiao vs. Antonio Margarito	Pacquiao wins by UD (120–108, 118–110, 119–109)	HBO	1,150,000
May 7, 2011	Manny Pacquiao vs. Shane Mosley	Pacquiao wins by UD (119–108, 120–108, 120–107)	Showtime	1,340,000
Sep 17, 2011	Floyd Mayweather Jr. vs. Victor Ortiz	Mayweather Jr. wins by KO in round 4	HBO	1,250,000
Nov 13, 2011	Manny Pacquiao vs. Juan Manuel Márquez III	Pacquiao wins by MD (115–113, 114–114, 116–112)	HBO	1,400,000
Dec 3, 2011	Miguel Cotto vs. Antonio Margarito II	Cotto wins by RTD in round 9	HBO	600,000
May 5, 2012	Floyd Mayweather Jr. vs. Miguel Cotto	Mayweather Jr. wins by UD (117–111, 117–111, 118–110)	HBO	1,500,000
Jun 9, 2012	Manny Pacquiao vs. Timothy Bradley	Bradley wins by SD (115–113, 115–113, 115–113)	HBO	890,000
Sep 15, 2012	Julio César Chávez Jr. vs. Sergio Martínez	Martínez wins by UD (118–109, 118–109, 117–110)	HBO	475,000
Dec 8, 2012	Manny Pacquiao vs. Juan Manuel Márquez IV	Márquez wins by KO in round 6	HBO	1,150,000
May 4, 2013	Floyd Mayweather Jr. vs. Robert Guerrero	Mayweather Jr. wins by UD (117–111, 117–111, 117–111)	Showtime	1,000,000
Sep 14, 2013	Floyd Mayweather Jr. vs. Canelo Álvarez	Mayweather Jr. wins by MD (117–111, 116–112, 114–114)	Showtime	2,200,000
Oct 12, 2013	Timothy Bradley vs. Juan Manuel Márquez	Bradley wins by SD (115–113, 116–112, 113–115)	HBO	375,000
Nov 24, 2013	Manny Pacquiao vs. Brandon Ríos	Pacquiao wins by UD (119–109, 120–108, 118–110)	HBO	475,000
Mar 8, 2014	Canelo Álvarez vs. Alfredo Angulo	Álvarez wins by TKO in Round 10	Showtime	350,000
Apr 12, 2014	Manny Pacquiao vs. Timothy Bradley II	Pacquiao wins by UD (116–112, 116–112, 118–110)	HBO	800,000
May 3, 2014	Floyd Mayweather Jr. vs. Marcos Maidana	Mayweather Jr. wins by MD (114–114, 117–111, 116–112)	Showtime	900,000
Jun 7, 2014	Sergio Martínez vs. Miguel Cotto	Cotto wins by RTD in round 10	HBO	315,000
Jul 12, 2014	Canelo Álvarez vs. Erislandy Lara	Álvarez wins by SD (115–113, 117–111, 113–115)	Showtime	300,000
Sep 13, 2014	Floyd Mayweather Jr. vs. Marcos Maidana II	Mayweather Jr. wins by UD (116–111, 116–111, 115–112)	Showtime	925,000
Nov 23, 2014	Manny Pacquiao vs. Chris Algieri	Pacquiao wins by UD (119–103, 119–103, 120–102)	HBO	400,000
May 2, 2015	Floyd Mayweather Jr. vs. Manny Pacquiao	Mayweather Jr. wins by UD (116–112, 116–112, 118–110)	HBO/Showtime	4,600,000
Sep 12, 2015	Floyd Mayweather Jr. vs. Andre Berto	Mayweather Jr. wins by UD (120–108, 118–110, 117–111)	Showtime	400,000
Oct 17, 2015	Gennady Golovkin vs. David Lemieux	Golovkin wins by TKO in round 8	HBO	150,000
Nov 21, 2015	Miguel Cotto vs. Canelo Álvarez	Álvarez wins by UD (117–111, 119–109, 118–110)	HBO	900,000
Apr 9, 2016	Manny Pacquiao vs. Timothy Bradley III	Pacquiao wins by UD (116–110, 116–110, 116–110)	HBO	400,000
May 7, 2016	Canelo Álvarez vs. Amir Khan	Álvarez wins by KO in round 6	HBO	600,000
July 23, 2016	Terence Crawford vs. Viktor Postol	Crawford wins by UD (118–107, 118–107, 117–108)	HBO	55,000
Sep 17, 2016	Canelo Álvarez vs. Liam Smith	Álvarez wins by TKO in round 9	HBO	300,000
Nov 5, 2016	Manny Pacquiao vs. Jessie Vargas	Pacquiao wins by UD (118–109, 118–109, 114–113)	Top Rank	300,000
Nov 19, 2016	Sergey Kovalev vs. Andre Ward	Ward wins by UD (114–113, 114–113, 114–113)	HBO	165,000
Mar 18, 2017	Gennady Golovkin vs. Daniel Jacobs	Golovkin wins by UD (115–112, 115–112, 114–113)	HBO	170,000
May 6, 2017	Canelo Álvarez vs. Julio César Chávez Jr.	Álvarez wins by UD (120–108, 120–108, 120–108)	HBO	1,000,000
Jun 17, 2017	Andre Ward vs. Sergey Kovalev II	Ward wins by TKO in round 8	HBO	130,000
Aug 26, 2017	Floyd Mayweather Jr. vs. Conor McGregor	Mayweather Jr. wins by TKO in round 10	Showtime	4,300,000
Sep 16, 2017	Canelo Álvarez vs. Gennady Golovkin	Split draw (118–110, 115–113, 114–114)	HBO	1,300,000
Sep 15, 2018	Canelo Álvarez vs. Gennady Golovkin II	Álvarez wins by MD (115–113, 114–114, 115–113)	HBO	1,100,000
Dec 1, 2018	Deontay Wilder vs. Tyson Fury	Split draw (115–111, 113–113, 112–114)	Showtime	325,000
Jan 19, 2019	Manny Pacquiao vs. Adrien Broner	Pacquiao wins by UD (117–111, 116–112, 116–112)	Showtime	400,000
Mar 16, 2019	Errol Spence Jr. vs. Mikey Garcia	Spence Jr. wins by UD (120–107, 120–108, 120–108)	Fox	375,000
Apr 20, 2019	Terence Crawford vs. Amir Khan	Crawford wins by TKO in round 6	ESPN	150,000
Jul 20, 2019	Manny Pacquiao vs. Keith Thurman	Pacquiao wins by SD (115–112, 115–112, 113–114)	Fox	500,000
Sep 28, 2019	Errol Spence Jr. vs. Shawn Porter	Spence wins by SD (116–111, 116–111, 112–115)	Fox	350,000
Nov 9, 2019	KSI vs. Logan Paul II	KSI wins by SD (56–55, 57–54, 55–56)	DAZN	2,000,000
Nov 23, 2019	Deontay Wilder vs. Luis Ortiz II	Wilder wins by KO in round 7	Fox	275,000
Feb 22, 2020	Deontay Wilder vs. Tyson Fury II	Fury wins by TKO in round 7	ESPN/Fox	800,000
Sep 26, 2020	Charlo Doubleheader VIII	Charlo wins by UD (116–112, 118–110, 117–111)	Showtime	120,000
Oct 31, 2020	Gervonta Davis vs. Leo Santa Cruz	Davis wins by KO in round 6	Showtime	225,000
Nov 28, 2020	Mike Tyson vs. Roy Jones Jr.	Split draw (76–76, 79–73, 76–80)	Triller	1,600,000
Dec 5, 2020	Errol Spence Jr. vs. Danny Garcia	Spence wins by UD (117–111, 116–112, 116–112)	Fox	250,000
May 1, 2021	Chris Arreola vs. Andy Ruiz Jr.	Ruiz wins by UD (118–109, 118–109, 117–110)	Fox	150,000
Jun 6, 2021	Floyd Mayweather Jr. vs. Logan Paul	Exhibition fight, no winner declared	Showtime	1,000,000
Jun 26, 2021	Mario Barrios vs. Gervonta Davis	Davis wins by TKO in round 11	Showtime	200,000
Aug 21, 2021	Manny Pacquiao vs. Yordenis Ugás	Ugas wins by UD (116–112, 116–112, 115–113)	Fox	250,000
Aug 29, 2021	Jake Paul vs. Tyron Woodley	Paul wins by SD (78–74, 77–75, 75–77)	Showtime	500,000
Oct 9, 2021	Tyson Fury vs. Deontay Wilder III	Fury wins by KO in round 11	ESPN/Fox	600,000
Nov 6, 2021	Canelo Álvarez vs. Caleb Plant	Álvarez wins by TKO in round 11	Showtime	800,000
Nov 20, 2021	Terence Crawford vs. Shawn Porter	Crawford wins by TKO in round 10	ESPN	135,000
Dec 5, 2021	Gervonta Davis vs. Isaac Cruz	Davis wins by UD (115–113, 115–113, 116–112)	Showtime	100,000
May 7, 2022	Canelo Álvarez vs. Dmitry Bivol	Bivol wins by UD (115–113, 115–113, 115–113)	DAZN	520,000
May 28, 2022	Gervonta Davis vs. Rolando Romero	Davis wins by TKO in round 6	Showtime	275,000
Sep 17, 2022	Canelo Álvarez vs. Gennady Golovkin III	Álvarez wins by UD (116–112, 115–113, 115–113)	DAZN	850,000
Oct 15, 2022	Deontay Wilder vs. Robert Helenius	Wilder wins by KO in round 1	Fox	75,000
Apr 22, 2023	Gervonta Davis vs. Ryan Garcia	Davis wins by TKO in round 7	Showtime/DAZN	1,200,000
May 20, 2023	Devin Haney vs. Vasiliy Lomachenko	Haney wins by UD (115–113, 116–112, 115–113)	ESPN	150,000
Jul 29, 2023	Errol Spence Jr. vs. Terence Crawford	Crawford wins by TKO in round 9	Showtime	675,000

==== United Kingdom ====
Select boxing pay-per-view figures (mainly from Sky Box Office) since 1966. Many of these figures are based on BARB weekly viewing data figures.

— Fights which held the UK PPV sales record

Date	Fight	Network	Buys	Source(s)
21 May 1966	Muhammad Ali vs. Henry Cooper II	Pay TV	40,000	
16 March 1996	Frank Bruno vs. Mike Tyson II	Sky Box Office	660,000	
9 November 1996	Naseem Hamed vs. Remigio Molina	Sky Box Office	420,000	
8 February 1997	Naseem Hamed vs. Tom Johnson	Sky Box Office	720,000	
3 May 1997	Naseem Hamed vs. Billy Hardy	Sky Box Office	348,000	
28 June 1997	Evander Holyfield vs. Mike Tyson II	Sky Box Office	550,000	
13 March 1999	Evander Holyfield vs. Lennox Lewis	Sky Box Office	400,000	
29 January 2000	Mike Tyson vs. Julius Francis	Sky Box Office	500,000	
19 August 2000	Naseem Hamed vs. Augie Sanchez	Sky Box Office	300,000	
8 June 2002	Lennox Lewis vs. Mike Tyson	Sky Box Office	750,000	
8 December 2007	Floyd Mayweather Jr. vs. Ricky Hatton	Sky Box Office	1,150,000	
6 September 2008	Amir Khan vs. Breidis Prescott	Sky Box Office	250,000	
6 December 2008	Amir Khan vs. Oisin Fagan	Sky Box Office		
14 March 2009	Amir Khan vs. Marco Antonio Barrera	Sky Box Office		
2 May 2009	Manny Pacquiao vs. Ricky Hatton	Sky Box Office	900,000	
18 July 2009	Amir Khan vs. Andreas Kotelnik	Sky Box Office	100,000	
7 November 2009	Nikolai Valuev vs. David Haye	Sky Box Office	469,000	
5 December 2009	Amir Khan vs. Dmitry Salita	Sky Box Office		
3 April 2010	David Haye vs. John Ruiz	Sky Box Office	253,000	
24 April 2010	Carl Froch vs. Mikkel Kessler	Primetime	50,000	
18 September 2010	Kell Brook vs. Michael Jennings	Sky Box Office	15,000	
13 November 2010	David Haye vs. Audley Harrison	Sky Box Office	304,000	
11 December 2010	Amir Khan vs. Marcos Maidana	Sky Box Office	164,000	
16 April 2011	Amir Khan vs. Paul McCloskey	Primetime	200,000	
21 May 2011	George Groves vs. James DeGale	Sky Box Office	43,000	
2 July 2011	Wladimir Klitschko vs. David Haye	Sky Box Office	1,197,000	
14 July 2012	David Haye vs. Derek Chisora	BoxNation	300,000	
25 May 2013	Carl Froch vs. Mikkel Kessler II	Sky Box Office	32,000	
23 November 2013	Carl Froch vs. George Groves	Sky Box Office	47,000	
31 May 2014	Carl Froch vs. George Groves II	Sky Box Office	355,000	
22 November 2014	Tony Bellew vs. Nathan Cleverly II	Sky Box Office	131,000	
2 May 2015	Floyd Mayweather Jr. vs. Manny Pacquiao	Sky Box Office	942,000	
30 May 2015	Kell Brook vs. Frankie Gavin	Sky Box Office	139,000	
28 November 2015	Wladimir Klitschko vs. Tyson Fury	Sky Box Office	655,000	
12 December 2015	Anthony Joshua vs. Dillian Whyte	Sky Box Office	699,000	
27 February 2016	Carl Frampton vs. Scott Quigg	Sky Box Office	220,000	
9 April 2016	Charles Martin vs. Anthony Joshua	Sky Box Office	1,368,000	
25 June 2016	Anthony Joshua vs. Dominic Breazeale	Sky Box Office	617,000	
10 September 2016	Gennady Golovkin vs. Kell Brook	Sky Box Office	752,000	
10 December 2016	Anthony Joshua vs. Éric Molina	Sky Box Office	764,000	
4 February 2017	Chris Eubank Jr. vs. Renold Quinlan	ITV Box Office	86,000	
4 March 2017	David Haye vs. Tony Bellew	Sky Box Office	1,515,000	
29 April 2017	Anthony Joshua vs. Wladimir Klitschko	Sky Box Office	1,631,000	
27 May 2017	Kell Brook vs. Errol Spence Jr	Sky Box Office	405,000	
26 August 2017	Floyd Mayweather Jr. vs. Conor McGregor	Sky Box Office	1,007,000	
28 October 2017	Anthony Joshua vs. Carlos Takam	Sky Box Office	1,009,000	
31 March 2018	Anthony Joshua vs. Joseph Parker	Sky Box Office	1,832,000	
5 May 2018	Tony Bellew vs. David Haye II	Sky Box Office	1,048,000	
28 July 2018	Dillian Whyte vs. Joseph Parker	Sky Box Office	571,000	
22 September 2018	Anthony Joshua vs. Alexander Povetkin	Sky Box Office	1,247,000	
10 November 2018	Oleksandr Usyk vs. Tony Bellew	Sky Box Office	819,000	
1 December 2018	Deontay Wilder vs. Tyson Fury	BT Sport Box Office	450,000	
22 December 2018	Dillian Whyte vs. Derek Chisora II	Sky Box Office	532,000	
1 June 2019	Anthony Joshua vs. Andy Ruiz Jr.	Sky Box Office	652,000	
20 July 2019	Dillian Whyte vs. Óscar Rivas	Sky Box Office	368,000	
31 August 2019	Vasiliy Lomachenko vs. Luke Campbell	Sky Box Office	205,000	
26 October 2019	Regis Prograis vs. Josh Taylor	Sky Box Office	176,000	
9 November 2019	KSI vs. Logan Paul II	Sky Box Office	216,000	
7 December 2019	Andy Ruiz Jr. vs. Anthony Joshua II	Sky Box Office	1,575,000	
22 August 2020	Dillian Whyte vs. Alexander Povetkin	Sky Box Office	337,000	
31 October 2020	Oleksandr Usyk vs. Derek Chisora	Sky Box Office	1,059,000	
12 December 2020	Anthony Joshua vs. Kubrat Pulev	Sky Box Office	948,000	
27 March 2021	Alexander Povetkin vs. Dillian Whyte II	Sky Box Office	197,000	
1 May 2021	Derek Chisora vs. Joseph Parker	Sky Box Office	145,000	
25 September 2021	Anthony Joshua vs. Oleksandr Usyk	Sky Box Office	1,232,000	
9 October 2021	Tyson Fury vs. Deontay Wilder III	BT Sport Box Office	300,000	
19 February 2022	Amir Khan vs. Kell Brook	Sky Box Office	600,000	
20 August 2022	Oleksandr Usyk vs. Anthony Joshua II	Sky Box Office	1,249,000	
3 December 2022	Tyson Fury vs. Derek Chisora III	BT Sport Box Office	500,000	
21 January 2023	Chris Eubank Jr. vs. Liam Smith	Sky Box Office	200,000	

=== Mixed martial arts (MMA) ===
The first pay-per-view mixed martial arts bout was Muhammad Ali vs. Antonio Inoki, which took place in Japan on June 26, 1976. It sold at least 2 million buys on closed-circuit theatre TV. At a ticket price of $10, the fight grossed at least $20 million (inflation-adjusted $110 million) or more from closed-circuit theatre TV revenue in the United States.

==== Ultimate Fighting Championship (UFC) ====
The highest buy rates for the UFC as of January 2021 are as follows.

Note: The UFC does not release official PPV statistics, and the following PPV numbers are as reported by industry insiders. As of April 2019, all PPV's are iPPV's, with distribution on the internet exclusively via ESPN+.

— Fights which held the UFC PPV sales record

Date	Event	Headline	Buy rate	Revenue (est.)
Oct 6, 2018	UFC 229	Khabib vs. McGregor	2,400,000	$180 million
Jul 10, 2021	UFC 264	Poirier vs. McGregor 3	1,800,000	
Aug 20, 2016	UFC 202	Diaz vs. McGregor 2	1,650,000	$90 million
Jan 24, 2021	UFC 257	Poirier vs. McGregor 2	1,600,000	
Jul 11, 2009	UFC 100	Lesnar vs. Mir	1,600,000	$82 million
Jan 18, 2020	UFC 246	McGregor vs Cowboy	1,353,429	
Mar 5, 2016	UFC 196	McGregor vs. Diaz	1,317,000	$80 million
Jul 11, 2020	UFC 251	Usman vs. Masvidal	1,300,000	$78 million
Nov 12, 2016	UFC 205	Alvarez vs. McGregor	1,300,000	$83 million
Jul 9, 2016	UFC 200	Tate vs. Nunes	1,200,000	$71 million
Dec 12, 2015	UFC 194	Aldo vs. McGregor	1,200,000	$80 million
Jul 3, 2010	UFC 116	Lesnar vs. Carwin	1,160,000	$55 million
Nov 15, 2015	UFC 193	Rousey vs. Holm	1,100,000	$60 million
Dec 30, 2016	UFC 207	Nunes vs. Rousey	1,100,000	$60 million
Dec 30, 2006	UFC 66	Liddell vs. Ortiz 2	1,050,000	$53 million
May 29, 2010	UFC 114	Rampage vs. Evans	1,050,000	$51 million
Oct 23, 2010	UFC 121	Lesnar vs. Velasquez	1,050,000	$45 million
Dec 28, 2013	UFC 168	Weidman vs. Silva II	1,025,000	$57 million
Nov 15, 2008	UFC 91	Couture vs. Lesnar	1,010,000	$47 million
Dec 27, 2008	UFC 92	Evans vs. Griffin	1,000,000	$48 million
Mar 16, 2013	UFC 158	St-Pierre vs. Diaz	950,000	
Jul 7, 2012	UFC 148	Silva vs. Sonnen II	925,000	
Jan 31, 2009	UFC 94	St-Pierre vs. Penn 2	920,000	
Aug 1, 2015	UFC 190	Rousey vs. Correia	900,000	
Nov 4, 2017	UFC 217	Bisping vs. St-Pierre	875,000	
Jul 29, 2017	UFC 214	Cormier vs. Jones 2	860,000	
Aug 8, 2009	UFC 101	Declaration	850,000	
Jul 11, 2015	UFC 189	Mendes vs. McGregor	825,000	
Mar 6, 2021	UFC 259	Błachowicz vs. Adesanya	800,000	
Apr 30, 2011	UFC 129	St-Pierre vs. Shields	800,000	
Jan 3, 2015	UFC 182	Jones vs. Cormier	800,000	
Dec 11, 2010	UFC 124	St-Pierre vs. Koscheck 2	785,000	
Mar 27, 2010	UFC 111	St-Pierre vs. Hardy	770,000	
Dec 30, 2011	UFC 141	Lesnar vs. Overeem	750,000	
Feb 5, 2011	UFC 126	Silva vs. Belfort	725,000	
Nov 6, 2021	UFC 268	Usman vs. Covington 2	700,000	
Dec 29, 2007	UFC 79	Nemesis	700,000	
Apr 21, 2012	UFC 145	Jones vs. Evans	700,000	
Nov 17, 2012	UFC 154	St. Pierre vs. Condit	700,000	
Dec 29, 2018	UFC 232	Jones vs. Gustafsson 2	700,000	
Apr 24, 2021	UFC 261	Usman vs. Masvidal 2	700,000	
May 9, 2020	UFC 249	Ferguson vs. Gaethje	700,000	
Sep 26, 2020	UFC 253	Adesanya vs. Costa	700,000	
Oct 24, 2020	UFC 254	Khabib vs. Gaethje	675,000	
May 26, 2007	UFC 71	Liddell vs. Jackson	675,000	

=== Professional wrestling (United States) ===
WrestleMania I in March 1985 sold over 1 million buys on closed-circuit theatre TV in the United States, making it the largest pay-per-view showing of a wrestling event in the US at the time.

==== PPV home television ====
The highest buy rates for professional wrestling events on pay-per-view home television as of June 2015 are as follows.

— Events which held the professional wrestling PPV sales record

No.	Date	Event	Buy rate
1	Apr 1, 2007	WrestleMania 23	1,250,000
2	Apr 1, 2012	WrestleMania XXVIII	1,219,000
3	Apr 3, 2011	WrestleMania XXVII	1,124,000
4	Apr 7, 2013	WrestleMania 29	1,104,000
5	Apr 3, 2005	WrestleMania 21	1,090,000
6	Mar 30, 2008	WrestleMania XXIV	1,041,000
7	Apr 1, 2001	WrestleMania X-Seven	1,040,000
8	Mar 14, 2004	WrestleMania XX	1,020,000
9	Apr 2, 2006	WrestleMania 22	975,000
10	Apr 5, 2009	WrestleMania 25	960,000
11	Mar 28, 2010	WrestleMania XXVI	885,000
12	Mar 17, 2002	WrestleMania X8	880,000
13	Apr 2, 2000	WrestleMania 2000	824,000
14	Mar 28, 1999	WrestleMania XV	800,000
15	Jul 22, 2001	WWF Invasion	770,000
16	Apr 2, 1989	WrestleMania V	767,000

== List of sportsmen with highest pay-per-view sales ==
This tables lists the sportsmen who have had the highest pay-per-view sales, with at least 10 million buys. It includes sportsmen who have participated in boxing, mixed martial arts, and professional wrestling.

Sportsman	Total sales (est.)	Closed-circuit theatre TV	PPV home television	Years	Sport(s)
Muhammad Ali	162,944,000	162,154,000 (Note: See Boxing career of Muhammad Ali § Pay-per-view bouts.)	790,000	1963–1985	Professional boxing
Muhammad Ali	162,944,000	162,154,000	790,000	1963–1985	Mixed martial arts
Muhammad Ali	162,944,000	162,154,000	790,000	1963–1985	Professional wrestling
Joe Frazier	100,500,000	100,000,000	500,000	1965–1981	Professional boxing
George Foreman	52,000,000	50,000,000	2,000,000	1974–1993	Professional boxing
Floyd Mayweather Jr.	29,090,000	223,000	28,867,000 (Note: See Floyd Mayweather Jr. § Pay-per-view bouts.)	2005–2017	Professional boxing
Floyd Mayweather Jr.	29,090,000	223,000	28,867,000	2005–2017	Professional wrestling
Manny Pacquiao	22,214,000	173,000	22,041,000 (Note: See Boxing career of Manny Pacquiao § Pay-per-view bouts.)	2005–2019	Professional boxing
Mike Tyson	20,700,000	920,000 (Note: See Mike Tyson § Pay-per-view bouts.)	19,780,000	1988–2020	Professional boxing
Mike Tyson	20,700,000	920,000	19,780,000	1988–2020	Professional wrestling
Triple H	20,329,000	—N/a	20,329,000 (Note: See List of WWE pay-per-view events)	1994–2019	Professional wrestling
Conor McGregor	18,400,000	—N/a	18,400,000 (Note: See Conor McGregor § Pay-per-view bouts.)	2015–2021	Mixed martial arts
Conor McGregor	18,400,000	—N/a	18,400,000	2015–2021	Professional boxing
John Cena	15,389,000	—N/a	15,389,000	2002–2021	Professional wrestling
The Rock	14,859,000	—N/a	14,859,000 (Note: See Dwayne Johnson)	1998–2013	Professional wrestling
The Undertaker	14,451,000	—N/a	14,451,000	1990–2020	Professional wrestling
Oscar De La Hoya	14,140,000	50,000	14,090,000 (Note: See Oscar De La Hoya § Pay-per-view bouts.)	1995–2008	Professional boxing
Anthony Joshua	13,441,000	—N/a	13,441,000 (Note: See Anthony Joshua § Pay-per-view bouts.)	2015–2021	Professional boxing
Brock Lesnar	12,771,000	—N/a	12,771,000 (Note: See Brock Lesnar § Pay-per-view bouts.)	2002–2020	Professional wrestling
Brock Lesnar	12,771,000	—N/a	12,771,000	2002–2020	Mixed martial arts
Evander Holyfield	12,720,000	120,000	12,600,000	1984–2003	Professional boxing
Canelo Álvarez	11,070,000	—N/a	11,070,000	2013–2023	Professional Boxing
Shawn Michaels	10,160,000	—N/a	10,160,000	1988–2018	Professional wrestling

== See also ==
- Bel Air Circuit
- Conditional access
- DAZN
- List of AEW pay-per-view events
- List of Bellator events
- List of DREAM events
- List of ECW supercards and pay-per-view events
- List of K-1 events
- List of ROH pay-per-view events
- List of Strikeforce events
- List of TNA pay-per-view events
- List of UFC events
- List of WCW pay-per-view events
- List of WWE pay-per-view events
