= Fernando Vargas =

American boxer (born 1977)

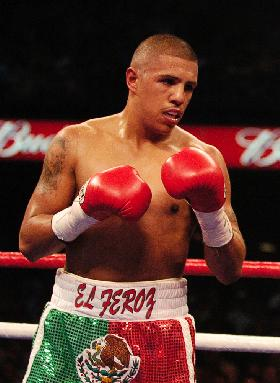
- Vargas in 2005

Personal information
- Nicknames: El Feroz; The Aztec Warrior; Ferocious
- Born: Fernando Javier Vargas; December 7, 1977 (age 48) Oxnard, California, U.S.
- Height: 5 ft 10 in (178 cm)
- Weight: Light middleweight; Super middleweight

Boxing career
- Reach: 74 in (188 cm)
- Stance: Orthodox

Boxing record
- Total fights: 31
- Wins: 26
- Win by KO: 22
- Losses: 5
Medal record
Men's amateur boxing
Representing United States
Pan American Games
| Bronze medal – third place | 1995 Mar del Plata | Light welterweight |

Fernando Javier Vargas (born December 7, 1977) is a Mexican-American former professional boxer who competed from 1997 to 2007. He was a two-time light middleweight world champion, having held the IBF title from 1998 to 2000, and the WBA title from 2001 to 2002. As an amateur he won a bronze medal in the light welterweight division at the 1995 Pan American Games, and reached the second round of the welterweight bracket at the 1996 Olympics.

Vargas is best known for his heated rivalries against Felix Trinidad, Oscar De La Hoya, Shane Mosley, and Ricardo Mayorga. Vargas is the father and trainer of Fernando Vargas Jr.

== Amateur career ==
In his youth Vargas compiled a remarkable amateur record of 100–5. In 1992, he won the 132 lb. championships at the Junior Olympics Box-Offs, and came in second at the Junior Olympics. In 1993, he captured the triple crown of amateur boxing: the Junior Olympics Box-Offs, the Junior Olympics, and the Junior Olympics International tournament. The following year he solidified his position as one of the premier amateur fighters in the world by winning the 132 lb gold medal at the Olympic Festival, seizing the U.S. Junior Championships at 132 lb, and by becoming the youngest fighter ever to win the U.S. Championships. In 1995, he was selected to the 1996 U.S. Olympic Team.

Vargas lost a controversial decision in the second round of the 1996 Atlanta Olympics. He was scheduled to turn pro in November 1996, however, while training for his debut bout he broke his right hand. Eager to turn pro and begin his march toward a world championship, Vargas "ferociously" followed his physical therapy program, and within five months he was ready for his professional debut.

=== Amateur achievements ===
- Won the 132-lb Junior Olympics Box-Offs; came in second at the Junior Olympics (1992)
- Won the Junior Olympics Box-Offs, the Junior Olympics, and the Junior Olympics International tournament (1993)
- Won the 132-lb gold medal at the U.S. Olympic Festival (1994), seizing the U.S. Championships at 132 pounds, becoming the youngest boxer ever to win the U.S. Championships (Seniors).
- Participated at the 1994 World Junior Championships, losing in the quarter-finals.
- 1995 Pan American Games Bronze Medalist in Mar Del Plata (ARG)
- Selected to the 1996 U.S. Olympic Team, defeated Tengiz Meskhadze (Georgia) 10–4, but lost to Marian Simion (Romania) 7–8 in the second bout.

== Professional career ==
In his professional debut on March 25, 1997, Vargas crushed Jorge Morales in just 56 seconds. He quickly beat his next five opponents, spending only eight rounds in his first six bouts. By the time of his first world championship he won all his 14 bouts by knockout. He stopped journeyman fighter Darren Maciunski on August 22, 1998 in a match that was televised by HBO. He won his first world title on December 22, 1998, forcing Yori Boy Campas to quit on his stool in seven rounds thus winning the IBF light middleweight world championship. Vargas successfully defended the title five times over 24 months, with victories over Howard Clarke (TKO 4), Raúl Márquez (TKO 11), Winky Wright (MD 12), Ross Thompson (TKO 4) and Ike Quartey (UD 12).

=== Trinidad vs. Vargas ===
Vargas lost the title to Félix Trinidad in December 2000. Vargas was knocked down twice in the first round, he was able to fight his way back by knocking down Trinidad in the fourth round until finally being knocked out in the 12th and final round.

=== Legal troubles ===
In 2001 Vargas was sentenced to 90 days in House Arrest stemming from a 1999 assault charge. Vargas and four friends were originally charged with assault with a deadly weapon and conspiracy to commit a crime stemming from a July 25, 1999, altercation at a Summerland, California home. The defendants were accused of assaulting Doug Rossi, 23, who had broken up a fight between Vargas and a female friend's ex-boyfriend.

=== De La Hoya vs. Vargas ===
On September 14, 2002, Vargas surrendered his WBA title to Oscar De La Hoya in a historical light middleweight championship unification showdown that filled the Mandalay Bay Events Center to capacity and sold approximately one million pay-per-view buys.

In the early rounds, Vargas bullied De La Hoya against the ropes and landed right hands to the head and body; however, in the middle and late rounds Vargas fatigued and De La Hoya's hand speed took over. After hurting Vargas at the end of round 10, De La Hoya dropped Vargas in the next round with a left hook to the head, and stopped him moments later with a flurry at the 1:48 mark of the round.

During mandatory drug testing after the fight, Vargas tested positive for the banned steroid stanozolol (also known as Winstrol). Vargas said the steroids were given to him without his knowledge, but he accepted full responsibility. The Nevada Athletic Commission announced on November 20, 2002, that it would fine Vargas $100,000 for his use of steroids. Fernando Vargas was suspended for nine months.

=== Comeback trail ===
Despite these problems, Fernando remained an accessible and popular celebrity, known for signing many autographs. After his knockout win over Fitz Vanderpool on July 26, 2003, he stood in a corner and yelled "I love you guys!" to his fans. Vargas continued his comeback, on December 12, with a seventh-round knockout of Tony Marshall that was shown live nationwide from Tucson, on TeleFutura. During that fight, Vargas injured a disc in his back, and his doctor recommended surgery, but Vargas chose to rehabilitate his back himself without having the procedure. This caused him to spend almost two years in inactivity, but, on March 26, 2005, he returned to boxing with a ten-round unanimous decision win over Ray Joval in Corpus Christi, Texas.

On August 20, 2005, he returned to the boxing ring to fight fellow former world light middleweight champion Javier Castillejo of Spain. Vargas dropped Castillejo in the third round, but Vargas apparently broke his right hand. Despite this, Vargas went on to win by a ten-round unanimous decision.

=== Mosley vs. Vargas I & II ===
On February 25, 2006, Vargas once again returned to the ring to face fellow Southern California boxer Sugar Shane Mosley. In a tightly contested battle, Vargas' left eye became grotesquely swollen and referee Joe Cortez decided to stop the fight in the 10th round to minimize further damage, granting a technical knockout (TKO) victory to Mosley. The reasoning for the stoppage, explained Nevada State Athletic Commission czar Marc Ratner, was that the referee and the fight doctor deemed that Vargas was unable to defend himself adequately against Mosley's right-hand shots. At the time of the stoppage, two judges had Mosley winning the fight 86–85. One judge had Vargas winning the fight 86–85. Fightnews.com had the bout scored 86-85 for Mosley. In the post fight press conference, Vargas made it clear that he would resume his boxing career and stated that a rematch with Mosley should be in order because the match was stopped on a technicality. ESPN boxing expert Dan Rafael wrote: "Vargas is so utterly delusional about what actually happened in his first fight with Mosley that we think he might have a concussion. When will he stop lying to himself -- and when will his team stop going along with him? He needs to admit that: (a) The swelling around his eye was caused by a clean punch, not a headbutt; and (b) He was not winning the fight when it was stopped in the 10th round."

In their highly anticipated July 15, 2006, rematch, Vargas was stopped in the 6th round via TKO. At the start of the sixth round, Mosley landed a huge left hook that sent Vargas crashing to the canvas. Vargas rolled over onto all fours and was unsteady, but after stumbling twice he finally beat referee Kenny Bayless' count. Moments later, Mosley unleashed another flurry as Vargas could only protect his face, and the referee stopped the fight at 2:38 as a beaten and disoriented Vargas staggered back to his corner.

=== Showdown with Ricardo Mayorga ===
It was confirmed on May 13, 2007, that Vargas would face Ricardo Mayorga on September 8, 2007, on Showtime PPV for the vacant WBC Continental Americas super middleweight title. However the fight was postponed after it was discovered during a routine blood test that Vargas was suffering from a severe iron deficiency. Doctors ordered Vargas not to participate in the upcoming bout until he received the necessary treatment to correct the problem. When the bout eventually took place it would be fought at 162 pounds, a weight that neither boxer has ever fought at. Many sources claim that Vargas had complained about fighting at the Jr. Middleweight limit of 154 pounds, stating that it's "too much for his body to take". Vargas has stated that fighting at that weight was the reason he did poorly against Mosley in the second fight.

Vargas claimed that this would be the last fight of his career regardless of the result. He warned Mayorga that he would not tolerate any insults from him like the ones he hurled at Oscar De La Hoya in their press conferences. Vargas stayed true to his promise when at the first official press conference for the fight, Mayorga said some offensive things towards Vargas and attempted to slap him. Vargas immediately jumped up from his seat and retaliated with punches and a brawl broke out between the two fighters' camps, though order was quickly restored. Vargas also recalled the time when Mayorga said Vargas was scared of him when he had defeated Javier Castillejo, then was stripped of his WBC light middleweight title rather than face Mayorga, who then defeated Michele Piccirillo for the vacant title. Ultimately the contestants faced off, and Mayorga defeated Vargas by majority decision on November 23, 2007. The scores were 113-113, 114–112, and 115–111. Crucially, Vargas was knocked down in the 1st round and again in the 11th round. Post-fight Ricardo Mayorga apologized to Vargas and the two forgave each other. Vargas officially declared his retirement soon after.

=== Cancelled return to boxing in 2011 ===
It was confirmed that after a three-year hiatus, former world champion Fernando Vargas would return to the boxing ring against super middleweight Henry Buchanan on April 16, 2011, at Hard Rock Casino in Las Vegas. However, the fight was canceled for unknown reasons.

== Acting career ==
Vargas had a role in the 2006 crime drama film Alpha Dog, playing the character Tiko "TKO" Martinez. Vargas also played an unnamed guest star on the television show Moesha, in the season two episode "Mama Said Knock You Out girl. “

== Reality television series ==
In 2014, Vargas and his family became the subjects of a reality show on Mun2 television station, Welcome to Los Vargas. He also participated, alongside Judith Grace, Maripily, Pedro Rivera and Sissi Fleitas, among others, in the Telemundo reality contest, Top Chef Celebrity.

== Professional boxing record ==
| 31 fights | 26 wins | 5 losses |
|---|---|---|
| By knockout | 22 | 4 |
| By decision | 4 | 1 |

| No. | Result | Record | Opponent | Type | Round, time | Date | Location | Notes |
|---|---|---|---|---|---|---|---|---|
| 31 | Loss | 26–5 | Ricardo Mayorga | MD | 12 | Nov 23, 2007 | Staples Center, Los Angeles, California, U.S. | For vacant WBC Continental Americas super middleweight title |
| 30 | Loss | 26–4 | Shane Mosley | TKO | 6 (12), 2:38 | Jul 15, 2006 | MGM Grand Garden Arena, Paradise, Nevada, U.S. | |
| 29 | Loss | 26–3 | Shane Mosley | TKO | 10 (12), 1:22 | Feb 25, 2006 | Mandalay Bay Events Center, Paradise, Nevada, U.S. | |
| 28 | Win | 26–2 | Javier Castillejo | UD | 10 | Aug 20, 2005 | Allstate Arena, Rosemont, Illinois, U.S. | |
| 27 | Win | 25–2 | Raymond Joval | UD | 10 | Mar 26, 2005 | American Bank Center, Corpus Christi, Texas, U.S. | |
| 26 | Win | 24–2 | Tony Marshall | RTD | 7 (10), 3:00 | Dec 12, 2003 | Casino Del Sol, Tucson, Arizona, U.S. | |
| 25 | Win | 23–2 | Fitz Vanderpool | TKO | 6 (10), 2:36 | Jul 26, 2003 | Grand Olympic Auditorium, Los Angeles, California, U.S. | |
| 24 | Loss | 22–2 | Oscar De La Hoya | TKO | 11 (12), 1:48 | Sep 14, 2002 | Mandalay Bay Events Center, Paradise, Nevada, U.S. | Lost WBA and IBA light middleweight titles; For WBC and vacant The Ring light middleweight titles |
| 23 | Win | 22–1 | Jose Flores | KO | 7 (12), 2:59 | Sep 22, 2001 | Mandalay Bay Events Center, Paradise, Nevada, U.S. | Won vacant WBA and IBA light middleweight titles |
| 22 | Win | 21–1 | Wilfredo Rivera | TKO | 6 (10), 0:39 | May 5, 2001 | Don Haskins Center, El Paso, Texas, U.S. | |
| 21 | Loss | 20–1 | Félix Trinidad | TKO | 12 (12), 1:33 | Dec 2, 2000 | Mandalay Bay Events Center, Paradise, Nevada, U.S. | Lost IBF light middleweight title; For WBA light middleweight title |
| 20 | Win | 20–0 | Ross Thompson | TKO | 4 (12), 1:07 | Aug 26, 2000 | Mandalay Bay Events Center, Paradise, Nevada, U.S. | Retained IBF light middleweight title |
| 19 | Win | 19–0 | Ike Quartey | UD | 12 | Apr 15, 2000 | Mandalay Bay Events Center, Paradise, Nevada, U.S. | Retained IBF light middleweight title |
| 18 | Win | 18–0 | Winky Wright | MD | 12 | Dec 4, 1999 | Chinook Winds Casino, Lincoln City, Oregon, U.S. | Retained IBF light middleweight title |
| 17 | Win | 17–0 | Raúl Márquez | TKO | 11 (12), 2:00 | Jul 17, 1999 | Caesars Tahoe, Stateline, Nevada, U.S. | Retained IBF light middleweight title |
| 16 | Win | 16–0 | Howard Clarke | TKO | 4 (12), 2:29 | Mar 13, 1999 | Madison Square Garden, New York City, New York, U.S. | Retained IBF light middleweight title |
| 15 | Win | 15–0 | Yori Boy Campas | RTD | 7 (12), 3:00 | Dec 12, 1998 | Etess Arena, Atlantic City, New Jersey, U.S. | Won IBF light middleweight title |
| 14 | Win | 14–0 | Darren Maciunski | TKO | 6 (10), 2:57 | Aug 22, 1998 | Boardwalk Hall, Atlantic City, New Jersey, U.S. | |
| 13 | Win | 13–0 | Anthony Stephens | TKO | 5 (10), 2:33 | Jun 23, 1998 | The Blue Horizon, Philadelphia, Pennsylvania, U.S. | |
| 12 | Win | 12–0 | Ron Johnson | TKO | 4 (10), 2:40 | May 9, 1998 | ARCO Arena, Sacramento, California, U.S. | |
| 11 | Win | 11–0 | Romallis Ellis | TKO | 2 (10), 1:56 | Apr 14, 1998 | Foxwoods Resort Casino, Ledyard, Connecticut, U.S. | |
| 10 | Win | 10–0 | Dan Connolly | TKO | 2 (10), 0:40 | Mar 13, 1998 | Miccosukee Resort & Gaming, Miami, Florida, U.S. | |
| 9 | Win | 9–0 | Eduardo Martinez | KO | 2 | Dec 13, 1997 | Foxwoods Resort Casino, Ledyard, Connecticut, U.S. | |
| 8 | Win | 8–0 | Jose Miguel Fernandez | TKO | 1 (8), 2:56 | Nov 22, 1997 | Etess Arena, Atlantic City, New Jersey, U.S. | |
| 7 | Win | 7–0 | Alex Quiroga | TKO | 6 (8), 2:53 | Oct 4, 1997 | Boardwalk Hall, Atlantic City, New Jersey, U.S. | |
| 6 | Win | 6–0 | Kevin Payne | TKO | 1 (4), 1:47 | Aug 19, 1997 | Convention Center, Austin, Texas, U.S. | |
| 5 | Win | 5–0 | Eugene Lopez | KO | 1 (6), 1:42 | Jul 12, 1997 | Caesars Tahoe, Stateline, Nevada, U.S. | |
| 4 | Win | 4–0 | Jim Maloney | KO | 1 | Jun 20, 1997 | Bally's Park Place, Atlantic City, New Jersey, U.S. | |
| 3 | Win | 3–0 | Bill Burden | TKO | 2 (6), 2:29 | Jun 7, 1997 | ARCO Arena, Sacramento, California, U.S. | |
| 2 | Win | 2–0 | Claude Staten | TKO | 2 (4), 1:24 | Apr 26, 1997 | Convention Hall, Atlantic City, New Jersey, U.S. | |
| 1 | Win | 1–0 | Jorge Morales | KO | 1 (4), 0:56 | Mar 25, 1997 | Civic Auditorium, Oxnard, California, U.S. | |

== Pay-per-view bouts ==
| Date | Fight | Billing | Buys | Network |
|---|---|---|---|---|
| December 2, 2000 | Trinidad vs. Vargas | Forces of Destruction | 520,000 | HBO |
| September 14, 2002 | De La Hoya vs. Vargas | Bad Blood | 935,000 | HBO |
| February 25, 2006 | Vargas vs. Mosley | Showdown | 420,000 | HBO |
| July 15, 2006 | Mosley vs. Vargas II | The Rematch | 350,000 | HBO |

== See also ==
- List of Mexican boxing world champions
- List of sportspeople sanctioned for doping offenses

Sporting positions
Minor world boxing titles
| Vacant Title last held by Santos Cardona | IBA light middleweight champion September 22, 2001 – September 14, 2002 | Succeeded by Oscar De La Hoya |
Major world boxing titles
| Preceded by Yori Boy Campas | IBF light middleweight champion December 12, 1998 – December 2, 2000 | Succeeded by Félix Trinidad |
| Vacant Title last held by Félix Trinidad | WBA light middleweight champion September 22, 2001 – September 14, 2002; Lost bid for Super title | Succeeded by Oscar De La Hoya as Super champion |
