= Channel 100 =

American pay television channel

Channel 100 was a pay television channel company run by Jeff Nathanson, Alan Greenstadt, and Elaine Paris. Also called Optical Systems, it was one of the first all pay-per-view cable TV channels. It used a box manufactured by TRW, in which a user inserted separately purchased punched plastic cards for access. In 1972, Mission Cable in San Diego became the first cable company to use the Optical Systems arrangement—under the name “Channel 100." Channel 100 operated on several cable television systems in the United States during the 1970s, including San Diego, California and Toledo, Ohio. It showed two movies a week.

== Sources ==
- John Sire, Oral History Collection, The Cable Center,
- Megan Gwynne Mullen, The Rise of Cable Programming in the United States: revolution or evolution?, 2003, University of Texas Press, ISBN 0-292-75273-3
