= Fernando Vargas vs. Ricardo Mayorga =

Boxing match

The Brawl
- Date: November 23, 2007
- Venue: Staples Center, Los Angeles, California, U.S.
- Title(s) on the line: vacant WBC Continental Americas super middleweight title

Tale of the tape
Boxer	Fernando Vargas	Ricardo Mayorga
Nickname	Ferocious	El Matador ("The Killer")
Hometown	Oxnard, California, U.S.	Masaya, Nicaragua
Pre-fight record	26–4 (22 KO)	27–6–1 (1) (22 KO)
Age	29 years, 11 months	34 years, 1 month
Height	5 ft 10 in (178 cm)	5 ft 9 in (175 cm)
Weight	164 lb (74 kg)	164 lb (74 kg)
Style	Orthodox	Orthodox
Recognition	WBC; No. 14 Ranked Light Middleweight; 2-time light middleweight champion	WBC; No. 15 Ranked Light Middleweight; 2-division world champion

Result
- Mayorga wins via majority decision (115–111, 114–112, 113–113)

Fernando Vargas vs. Ricardo Mayorga, billed as The Brawl, was a professional boxing match contested on November 23, 2007.

== Background ==
After having reached an agreement in May 2007, the fight between 2-time light middleweight champion Fernando Vargas and 2-division champion Ricardo Mayorga was formally announced at press conference on July 11. As customary with Mayorga, when it was his turn to speak, he used unrelenting trash talk to insult his opponent. Mayorga referred to Vargas as "fatty" due to Vargas' insistence on fighting at a catchweight of 162 pounds, vowed to retire him and claimed that he would be doing Vargas' wife "a favor and not let her cry anymore after I disfigure you." Immediately after Mayorga made the statement about his wife, Vargas stood up and confronted Mayorga, who slapped Vargas, who in turn landed two blows to Mayorga as both fighter's respective parties separated the two. After order was restored and Mayorga left the room, Vargas announced that the fight would be his last, claiming that "pride" was the reason for taking the fight as he did not want to end his career on the consecutive losses he had suffered to Shane Mosley the previous year.

The fight was originally scheduled to take place on September 8, however, after feeling sluggish and tired while training for the bout, Vargas was diagnosed with anemia following a doctor's visit. Per doctor's orders, Vargas was told he could not train for three weeks resulting in the fight being postponed and ultimately rescheduled for November 23. Due to his illness, Vargas insisted on the original agreed upon catchweight of 162 pounds being moved up to 166 pounds, two pounds under the super middleweight limit of 168 pounds. Both fighters weighed in at 164 pounds, two pounds under the catchweight.

== Fight Details ==
=== Main Event ===
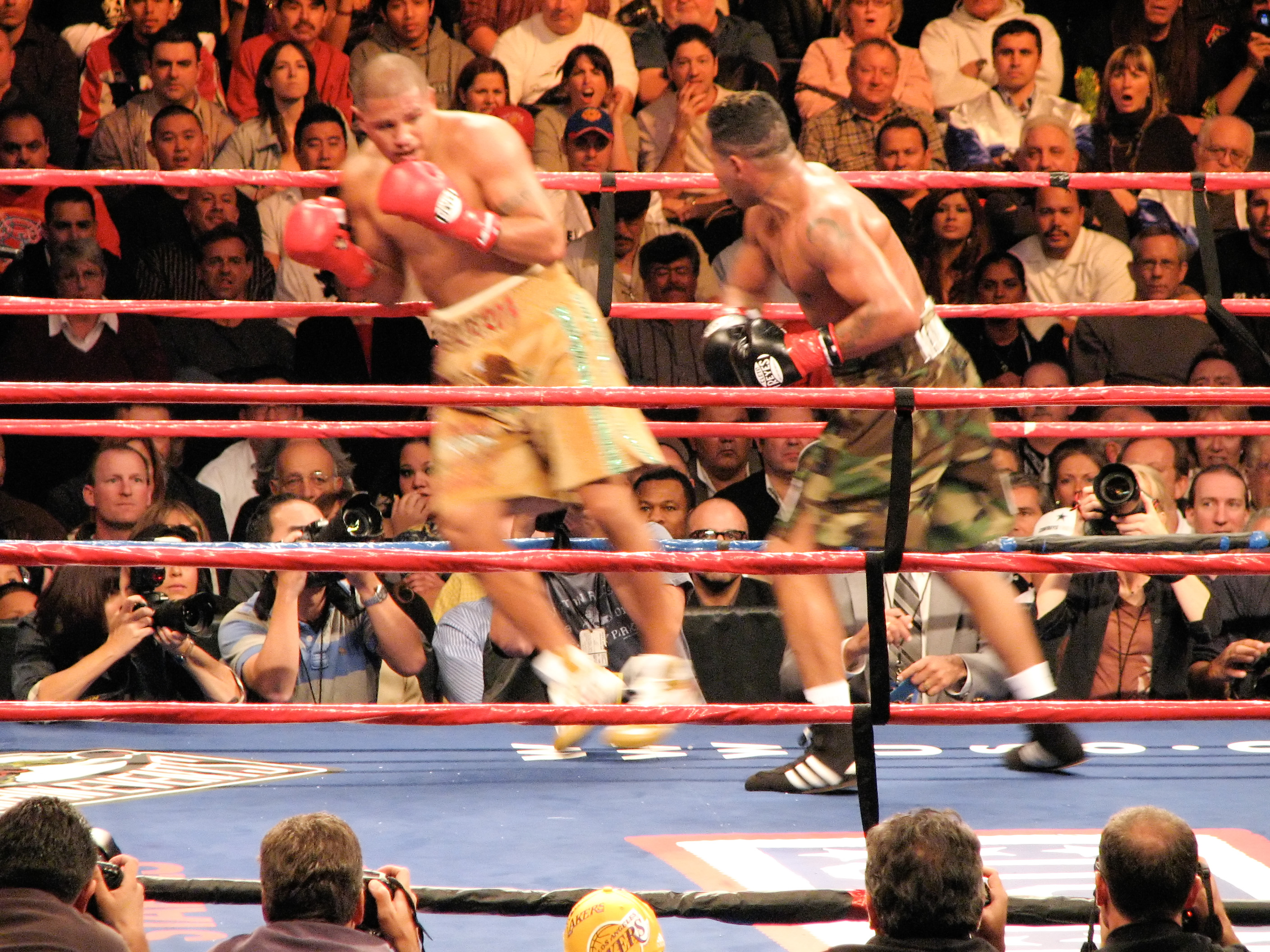
Mayorga (right) dropping Vargas

Mayorga scored the fights only two knockdowns, first sending Vargas down in the final 20 seconds of the first round after landing a hard combination and then again in the eleventh round after scoring flush with a right hand in the final seconds before the round ended. The two knockdowns suffered proved costly for Vargas as he would lose a close majority decision to Mayorga, who took two of the judge's official scorecards by scores of 115–111 and 114–112 while the third had the fight even at 113–113.

== Fight card ==
Confirmed bouts:

Weight Class	Weight		vs.		Method	Round	Notes
Catchweight	166 lbs.	Ricardo Mayorga	def.	Fernando Vargas	MD	12/12	^{note 1}
Welterweight	147 lbs.	Kermit Cintrón	def.	Jesse Feliciano	TKO	10/12	^{note 2}
Light Middleweight	154 lbs.	Roman Karmazin	def.	Alejandro García	KO	3/12	^{note 3}
Preliminary bouts
Super Featherweight	130 lbs.	Jason Litzau	def.	Edel Ruiz	UD	10/10
Lightweight	135 lbs.	Fernando Angulo	def.	Damian Fuller	UD	10/10
Light Middleweight	154 lbs.	Henry Crawford	def.	Jose Juan Bermejo	UD	8/8
Heavyweight	200+ lbs.	Evans Quinn	def.	Victor Barragan	TKO	1/8
Light Middleweight	154 lbs.	Nelson Linares	def.	Jorge Alberto Padilla	UD	8/8

^Note 1 For WBC Continental Americas super middleweight title
^Note 2 For IBF welterweight title
^Note 3 WBA light middleweight title eliminator

== Broadcasting ==
Country	Broadcaster
United States	Showtime

Preceded by vs. Shane Mosley II	Fernando Vargas's bouts 23 November 2007	Retired
Preceded by vs. Oscar De La Hoya	Ricardo Mayorga's bouts 23 November 2007	Succeeded by vs. Shane Mosley
