= 1990 Miller Genuine Draft 500 =

13th race of the 1990 NASCAR Winston Cup Series

Race details
- Race 13 of 29 in the 1990 NASCAR Winston Cup Series
- The 1990 Miller Genuine Draft 500 program cover, featuring Rusty Wallace. Artwork by NASCAR artist Sam Bass.
- Date: June 17, 1990
- Official name: 9th Annual Miller Genuine Draft 500
- Location: Long Pond, Pennsylvania, Pocono Raceway
- Course: Permanent racing facility
- Course length: 2.5 miles (4.0 km)
- Distance: 200 laps, 500 mi (804.672 km)
- Scheduled distance: 200 laps, 500 mi (804.672 km)
- Average speed: 120.6 miles per hour (194.1 km/h)
- Attendance: 80,000

Pole position
Driver	Ernie Irvan	Morgan-McClure Motorsports
- Time: 56.693

Most laps led
Driver	Geoff Bodine	Junior Johnson & Associates
- Laps: 31

Winner
No. 33	Harry Gant	Leo Jackson Motorsports

Television in the United States
- Network: Viewer's Choice (PPV)
- Announcers: Dave Despain, Lyn St. James, Phil Parsons

Radio in the United States
- Radio: Motor Racing Network

The 1990 Miller Genuine Draft 500 was the 13th stock car race of the 1990 NASCAR Winston Cup Series season and the ninth iteration of the event. The race was held on Sunday, June 17, 1990, before an audience of 80,000 in Long Pond, Pennsylvania, at Pocono Raceway, a 2.5 miles (4.0 km) triangular permanent course. The race took the scheduled 200 laps to complete. In the final laps, Leo Jackson Motorsports driver Harry Gant mounted a late-race charge, passing for the lead with 12 laps to go in the race to take his 11th career NASCAR Winston Cup Series victory and his only victory of the season. To fill out the top three, Blue Max Racing driver Rusty Wallace and Junior Johnson & Associates driver Geoff Bodine would finish second and third, respectively. This would also be the final televised NASCAR race to exclusively air on pay-per-view.

== Background ==
The layout of Pocono International Raceway, the venue where the race was held.

The race was held at Pocono International Raceway, which is a three-turn superspeedway located in Long Pond, Pennsylvania. The track hosts two annual NASCAR Sprint Cup Series races, as well as one Xfinity Series and Camping World Truck Series event. Until 2019, the track also hosted an IndyCar Series race.

Pocono International Raceway is one of a very few NASCAR tracks not owned by either Speedway Motorsports, Inc. or International Speedway Corporation. It is operated by the Igdalsky siblings Brandon, Nicholas, and sister Ashley, and cousins Joseph IV and Chase Mattioli, all of whom are third-generation members of the family-owned Mattco Inc, started by Joseph II and Rose Mattioli.

Outside of the NASCAR races, the track is used throughout the year by the Sports Car Club of America (SCCA) and motorcycle clubs as well as racing schools and an IndyCar race. The triangular oval also has three separate infield sections of racetrack – North Course, East Course and South Course. Each of these infield sections use a separate portion of the tri-oval to complete the track. During regular non-race weekends, multiple clubs can use the track by running on different infield sections. Also some of the infield sections can be run in either direction, or multiple infield sections can be put together – such as running the North Course and the South Course and using the tri-oval to connect the two.

=== Entry list ===
- (R) denotes rookie driver.

#	Driver	Team	Make
1	Terry Labonte	Precision Products Racing	Oldsmobile
2	Troy Beebe	U.S. Racing	Pontiac
3	Dale Earnhardt	Richard Childress Racing	Chevrolet
4	Ernie Irvan	Morgan–McClure Motorsports	Oldsmobile
5	Ricky Rudd	Hendrick Motorsports	Chevrolet
6	Mark Martin	Roush Racing	Ford
7	Alan Kulwicki	AK Racing	Ford
8	Bobby Hillin Jr.	Stavola Brothers Racing	Buick
9	Bill Elliott	Melling Racing	Ford
10	Derrike Cope	Whitcomb Racing	Chevrolet
11	Geoff Bodine	Junior Johnson & Associates	Ford
12	Hut Stricklin	Bobby Allison Motorsports	Buick
13	Randy LaJoie	Linro Motorsports	Buick
15	Morgan Shepherd	Bud Moore Engineering	Ford
17	Darrell Waltrip	Hendrick Motorsports	Chevrolet
18	Greg Sacks	Hendrick Motorsports	Chevrolet
19	Chad Little	Little Racing	Ford
20	Rob Moroso (R)	Moroso Racing	Oldsmobile
21	Dale Jarrett	Wood Brothers Racing	Ford
25	Ken Schrader	Hendrick Motorsports	Chevrolet
26	Brett Bodine	King Racing	Buick
27	Rusty Wallace	Blue Max Racing	Pontiac
28	Davey Allison	Robert Yates Racing	Ford
30	Michael Waltrip	Bahari Racing	Pontiac
33	Harry Gant	Leo Jackson Motorsports	Oldsmobile
38	Jim Sauter	Dick Johnson Racing	Ford
42	Kyle Petty	SABCO Racing	Pontiac
43	Richard Petty	Petty Enterprises	Pontiac
47	Jack Pennington (R)	Close Racing	Oldsmobile
52	Jimmy Means	Jimmy Means Racing	Pontiac
53	Jerry O'Neil (R)	Aroneck Racing	Oldsmobile
54	Tommy Riggins	Hakes–Welliver Racing	Oldsmobile
57	Jimmy Spencer	Osterlund Racing	Pontiac
66	Dick Trickle	Cale Yarborough Motorsports	Pontiac
70	J. D. McDuffie	McDuffie Racing	Pontiac
71	Dave Marcis	Marcis Auto Racing	Chevrolet
74	Mike Potter	Wawak Racing	Pontiac
75	Rick Wilson	RahMoc Enterprises	Pontiac
80	Jimmy Horton	S&H Racing	Ford
94	Sterling Marlin	Hagan Racing	Oldsmobile
98	Butch Miller	Travis Carter Enterprises	Chevrolet

== Qualifying ==
Qualifying was split into two rounds. The first round was held on Friday, June 15, at 3:00 PM EST. Each driver would have one lap to set a time. During the first round, the top 15 drivers in the round would be guaranteed a starting spot in the race. If a driver was not able to guarantee a spot in the first round, they had the option to scrub their time from the first round and try and run a faster lap time in a second round qualifying run, held on Saturday, June 16, at 10:30 AM EST. As with the first round, each driver would have one lap to set a time. For this specific race, positions 16-40 would be decided on time, and depending on who needed it, a select amount of positions were given to cars who had not otherwise qualified but were high enough in owner's points; up to two provisionals were given.

Ernie Irvan, driving for Morgan–McClure Motorsports, would win the pole, setting a time of 56.693 and an average speed of 158.750 miles per hour (255.483 km/h) in the first round.

Mike Potter was the only driver to fail to qualify.

=== Full qualifying results ===
Pos.	#	Driver	Team	Make	Time	Speed
1	4	Ernie Irvan	Morgan–McClure Motorsports	Oldsmobile	56.693	158.750
2	66	Dick Trickle	Cale Yarborough Motorsports	Pontiac	57.060	157.729
3	9	Bill Elliott	Melling Racing	Ford	57.110	157.591
4	11	Geoff Bodine	Junior Johnson & Associates	Ford	57.122	157.558
5	18	Greg Sacks	Hendrick Motorsports	Chevrolet	57.226	157.271
6	3	Dale Earnhardt	Richard Childress Racing	Chevrolet	57.243	157.224
7	94	Sterling Marlin	Hagan Racing	Oldsmobile	57.261	157.175
8	25	Ken Schrader	Hendrick Motorsports	Chevrolet	57.278	157.128
9	17	Darrell Waltrip	Hendrick Motorsports	Chevrolet	57.291	157.093
10	7	Alan Kulwicki	AK Racing	Ford	57.303	157.060
11	6	Mark Martin	Roush Racing	Ford	57.353	156.923
12	28	Davey Allison	Robert Yates Racing	Ford	57.441	156.683
13	21	Dale Jarrett	Wood Brothers Racing	Ford	57.448	156.663
14	42	Kyle Petty	SABCO Racing	Pontiac	57.482	156.571
15	5	Ricky Rudd	Hendrick Motorsports	Chevrolet	57.535	156.427
Failed to lock in Round 1
16	33	Harry Gant	Leo Jackson Motorsports	Oldsmobile	57.629	156.171
17	10	Derrike Cope	Whitcomb Racing	Chevrolet	57.651	156.112
18	75	Rick Wilson	RahMoc Enterprises	Oldsmobile	57.659	156.090
19	30	Michael Waltrip	Bahari Racing	Pontiac	57.712	155.947
20	26	Brett Bodine	King Racing	Buick	57.720	155.925
21	12	Hut Stricklin	Bobby Allison Motorsports	Buick	57.868	155.526
22	43	Richard Petty	Petty Enterprises	Pontiac	57.908	155.419
23	57	Jimmy Spencer	Osterlund Racing	Pontiac	57.922	155.381
24	27	Rusty Wallace	Blue Max Racing	Pontiac	57.935	155.347
25	8	Bobby Hillin Jr.	Stavola Brothers Racing	Buick	58.067	154.993
26	98	Butch Miller	Travis Carter Enterprises	Chevrolet	58.085	154.945
27	1	Terry Labonte	Precision Products Racing	Oldsmobile	58.194	154.655
28	13	Randy LaJoie	Linro Motorsports	Buick	58.235	154.546
29	15	Morgan Shepherd	Bud Moore Engineering	Ford	58.256	154.491
30	20	Rob Moroso (R)	Moroso Racing	Oldsmobile	58.319	154.324
31	71	Dave Marcis	Marcis Auto Racing	Chevrolet	58.325	154.308
32	80	Jimmy Horton	S&H Racing	Ford	58.603	153.576
33	47	Jack Pennington (R)	Close Racing	Oldsmobile	58.672	153.395
34	38	Jim Sauter	Dick Johnson Racing	Ford	58.795	153.074
35	19	Chad Little	Little Racing	Ford	58.862	152.900
36	54	Tommy Riggins	Hakes–Welliver Racing	Oldsmobile	58.990	152.568
37	53	Jerry O'Neil (R)	Aroneck Racing	Oldsmobile	59.461	151.360
38	52	Jimmy Means	Jimmy Means Racing	Pontiac	59.517	151.217
39	2	Troy Beebe	U.S. Racing	Pontiac	59.565	151.095
40	70	J. D. McDuffie	McDuffie Racing	Pontiac	1:00.116	149.711
Failed to qualify
41	74	Mike Potter	Wawak Racing	Pontiac	-*	-*
Official first round qualifying results
Official starting lineup

== Race results ==
Fin	St	#	Driver	Team	Make	Laps	Led	Status	Pts	Winnings
1	16	33	Harry Gant	Leo Jackson Motorsports	Oldsmobile	200	15	running	180	$54,350
2	24	27	Rusty Wallace	Blue Max Racing	Pontiac	200	19	running	175	$37,307
3	4	11	Geoff Bodine	Junior Johnson & Associates	Ford	200	31	running	175	$30,750
4	20	26	Brett Bodine	King Racing	Buick	200	12	running	165	$19,850
5	12	28	Davey Allison	Robert Yates Racing	Ford	200	0	running	155	$20,700
6	21	12	Hut Stricklin	Bobby Allison Motorsports	Buick	200	0	running	150	$11,425
7	5	18	Greg Sacks	Hendrick Motorsports	Chevrolet	200	29	running	151	$11,050
8	9	17	Darrell Waltrip	Hendrick Motorsports	Chevrolet	200	0	running	142	$15,925
9	7	94	Sterling Marlin	Hagan Racing	Oldsmobile	200	0	running	138	$10,675
10	14	42	Kyle Petty	SABCO Racing	Pontiac	200	12	running	139	$15,350
11	29	15	Morgan Shepherd	Bud Moore Engineering	Ford	200	18	running	135	$9,850
12	17	10	Derrike Cope	Whitcomb Racing	Chevrolet	200	3	running	132	$10,550
13	6	3	Dale Earnhardt	Richard Childress Racing	Chevrolet	200	3	running	129	$14,150
14	11	6	Mark Martin	Roush Racing	Ford	200	4	running	126	$13,150
15	8	25	Ken Schrader	Hendrick Motorsports	Chevrolet	200	0	running	118	$12,525
16	3	9	Bill Elliott	Melling Racing	Ford	200	0	running	115	$13,450
17	1	4	Ernie Irvan	Morgan–McClure Motorsports	Oldsmobile	200	18	running	117	$15,125
18	35	19	Chad Little	Little Racing	Ford	200	0	running	109	$4,650
19	19	30	Michael Waltrip	Bahari Racing	Pontiac	200	1	running	111	$8,425
20	27	1	Terry Labonte	Precision Products Racing	Oldsmobile	200	0	running	103	$8,975
21	33	47	Jack Pennington (R)	Close Racing	Oldsmobile	200	1	running	105	$4,925
22	31	71	Dave Marcis	Marcis Auto Racing	Chevrolet	200	0	running	97	$7,675
23	26	98	Butch Miller	Travis Carter Enterprises	Chevrolet	199	0	running	94	$5,775
24	34	38	Jim Sauter	Dick Johnson Racing	Ford	199	0	running	91	$3,925
25	2	66	Dick Trickle	Cale Yarborough Motorsports	Pontiac	198	0	accident	88	$7,075
26	36	54	Tommy Riggins	Hakes–Welliver Racing	Oldsmobile	196	0	running	85	$3,825
27	38	52	Jimmy Means	Jimmy Means Racing	Pontiac	194	0	running	82	$3,775
28	40	70	J. D. McDuffie	McDuffie Racing	Pontiac	188	0	running	79	$3,725
29	25	8	Bobby Hillin Jr.	Stavola Brothers Racing	Buick	180	0	engine	76	$6,675
30	23	57	Jimmy Spencer	Osterlund Racing	Pontiac	172	1	accident	78	$6,575
31	13	21	Dale Jarrett	Wood Brothers Racing	Ford	171	0	accident	70	$6,425
32	15	5	Ricky Rudd	Hendrick Motorsports	Chevrolet	169	0	running	67	$6,275
33	28	13	Randy LaJoie	Linro Motorsports	Buick	167	0	accident	64	$3,450
34	10	7	Alan Kulwicki	AK Racing	Ford	165	29	accident	66	$6,850
35	18	75	Rick Wilson	RahMoc Enterprises	Oldsmobile	150	0	engine	58	$6,025
36	30	20	Rob Moroso (R)	Moroso Racing	Oldsmobile	134	4	accident	60	$4,950
37	39	2	Troy Beebe	U.S. Racing	Pontiac	119	0	accident	0	$5,875
38	22	43	Richard Petty	Petty Enterprises	Pontiac	94	0	accident	49	$3,825
39	32	80	Jimmy Horton	S&H Racing	Ford	65	0	engine	46	$3,200
40	37	53	Jerry O'Neil (R)	Aroneck Racing	Oldsmobile	22	0	crank	43	$3,150
Official race results

== Standings after the race ==
Drivers' Championship standings

	Pos	Driver	Points
	1	Mark Martin	1,926
	2	Morgan Shepherd	1,873 (-53)
	3	Rusty Wallace	1,863 (-63)
1	4	Geoff Bodine	1,819 (–107)
1	5	Dale Earnhardt	1,793 (–133)
	6	Kyle Petty	1,733 (–193)
	7	Ken Schrader	1,673 (–253)
	8	Bill Elliott	1,661 (–265)
	9	Darrell Waltrip	1,659 (–267)
	10	Ernie Irvan	1,621 (–305)
Official driver's standings

- Note: Only the first 10 positions are included for the driver standings.

Previous race: 1990 Banquet Frozen Foods 300	NASCAR Winston Cup Series; 1990 season	Next race: 1990 Miller Genuine Draft 400 (Michigan)
