= 1990 Miller Genuine Draft 400 (Michigan) =

14th race of the 1990 NASCAR Winston Cup Series

Race details
- Race 14 of 29 in the 1990 NASCAR Winston Cup Series
- The 1990 Miller Genuine Draft 400 program cover, featuring Rusty Wallace. Artwork by NASCAR artist Sam Bass.
- Date: June 24, 1990
- Official name: 22nd Annual Miller Genuine Draft 400
- Location: Brooklyn, Michigan, Michigan International Speedway
- Course: Permanent racing facility
- Course length: 2 miles (3.2 km)
- Distance: 200 laps, 400 mi (643.737 km)
- Scheduled distance: 200 laps, 400 mi (643.737 km)
- Average speed: 150.219 miles per hour (241.754 km/h)
- Attendance: 85,000

Pole position
Driver	Mark Martin	Roush Racing
- Time: Set by 1990 owner's points

Most laps led
Driver	Bill Elliott	Melling Racing
- Laps: 102

Winner
No. 3	Dale Earnhardt	Richard Childress Racing

Television in the United States
- Network: CBS
- Announcers: Ken Squier, Ned Jarrett, Chris Economaki

Radio in the United States
- Radio: Motor Racing Network

The 1990 Miller Genuine Draft 400 was the 14th stock car race of the 1990 NASCAR Winston Cup Series season and the 22nd iteration of the event. The race was held on Sunday, June 24, 1990, before an audience of 85,000 in Brooklyn, Michigan, at Michigan International Speedway, a two-mile (3.2 km) moderate-banked D-shaped speedway. The race took the scheduled 200 laps to complete. In the final laps of the race, Richard Childress Racing driver Dale Earnhardt would manage to take advantage of a blown engine of the dominant driver of the day, Bill Elliott, and make a late-race charge to the front, passing for the lead with six to go to take his 43rd career NASCAR Winston Cup Series victory and his fourth victory of the season. To fill out the top three, Morgan–McClure Motorsports driver Ernie Irvan and Junior Johnson & Associates driver Geoff Bodine would finish second and third, respectively.

== Background ==
The layout of Michigan International Speedway, the venue where the race was held.

The race was held at Michigan International Speedway, a two-mile (3.2 km) moderate-banked D-shaped speedway located in Brooklyn, Michigan. The track is used primarily for NASCAR events. It is known as a "sister track" to Texas World Speedway as MIS's oval design was a direct basis of TWS, with moderate modifications to the banking in the corners, and was used as the basis of Auto Club Speedway. The track is owned by International Speedway Corporation. Michigan International Speedway is recognized as one of motorsports' premier facilities because of its wide racing surface and high banking (by open-wheel standards; the 18-degree banking is modest by stock car standards).

=== Entry list ===
- (R) denotes rookie driver.

#	Driver	Team	Make
1	Terry Labonte	Precision Products Racing	Oldsmobile
01	Mickey Gibbs	Gibbs Racing	Ford
2	Troy Beebe	U.S. Racing	Pontiac
3	Dale Earnhardt	Richard Childress Racing	Chevrolet
4	Ernie Irvan	Morgan–McClure Motorsports	Oldsmobile
5	Ricky Rudd	Hendrick Motorsports	Chevrolet
6	Mark Martin	Roush Racing	Ford
7	Alan Kulwicki	AK Racing	Ford
8	Bobby Hillin Jr.	Stavola Brothers Racing	Buick
9	Bill Elliott	Melling Racing	Ford
10	Derrike Cope	Whitcomb Racing	Chevrolet
11	Geoff Bodine	Junior Johnson & Associates	Ford
12	Hut Stricklin	Bobby Allison Motorsports	Buick
15	Morgan Shepherd	Bud Moore Engineering	Ford
17	Darrell Waltrip	Hendrick Motorsports	Chevrolet
18	Greg Sacks	Hendrick Motorsports	Chevrolet
20	Rob Moroso (R)	Moroso Racing	Oldsmobile
21	Dale Jarrett	Wood Brothers Racing	Ford
23	Eddie Bierschwale	B&B Racing	Oldsmobile
25	Ken Schrader	Hendrick Motorsports	Chevrolet
26	Brett Bodine	King Racing	Buick
27	Rusty Wallace	Blue Max Racing	Pontiac
28	Davey Allison	Robert Yates Racing	Ford
29	Phil Parsons	Diamond Ridge Motorsports	Pontiac
30	Michael Waltrip	Bahari Racing	Pontiac
33	Harry Gant	Leo Jackson Motorsports	Oldsmobile
34	Charlie Glotzbach	AAG Racing	Buick
35	Bill Venturini	Venturini Motorsports	Chevrolet
42	Kyle Petty	SABCO Racing	Pontiac
43	Richard Petty	Petty Enterprises	Pontiac
47	Jack Pennington (R)	Close Racing	Oldsmobile
50	Rich Vogler	RaDiUs Motorsports	Chevrolet
52	Jimmy Means	Jimmy Means Racing	Pontiac
57	Jimmy Spencer	Osterlund Racing	Pontiac
66	Dick Trickle	Cale Yarborough Motorsports	Pontiac
70	J. D. McDuffie	McDuffie Racing	Pontiac
71	Dave Marcis	Marcis Auto Racing	Chevrolet
75	Rick Wilson	RahMoc Enterprises	Pontiac
77	Ken Ragan	Ragan Racing	Ford
83	Lake Speed	Speed Racing	Oldsmobile
89	Rodney Combs	Mueller Brothers Racing	Pontiac
91	Ed Cooper	Ed Cooper Racing	Oldsmobile
94	Sterling Marlin	Hagan Racing	Oldsmobile
98	Butch Miller	Travis Carter Enterprises	Chevrolet

== Qualifying ==
Two rounds of qualifying were scheduled to be held on Friday, March 26, and Saturday, March 27. However, Friday's session was cancelled due to rain, with both rounds then scheduled to commence on Saturday. However, Saturday's sessions would also be cancelled due to rain, leaving qualifying to be determined by a system of owner's points and postmarks on entry list blanks. The top 30 positions would be determined by the current 1993 owner's points, while the final nine spots would be determined by a system of provisionals that included past winners, and finally postmarks. As a result, Roush Racing driver Mark Martin would win the pole.

Four drivers would fail to qualify.

=== Full qualifying results ===
Pos.	#	Driver	Team	Make
1	6	Mark Martin	Roush Racing	Ford
2	15	Morgan Shepherd	Bud Moore Engineering	Ford
3	27	Rusty Wallace	Blue Max Racing	Pontiac
4	11	Geoff Bodine	Junior Johnson & Associates	Ford
5	3	Dale Earnhardt	Richard Childress Racing	Chevrolet
6	42	Kyle Petty	SABCO Racing	Pontiac
7	25	Ken Schrader	Hendrick Motorsports	Chevrolet
8	9	Bill Elliott	Melling Racing	Ford
9	17	Darrell Waltrip	Hendrick Motorsports	Chevrolet
10	28	Davey Allison	Robert Yates Racing	Ford
11	4	Ernie Irvan	Morgan–McClure Motorsports	Oldsmobile
12	26	Brett Bodine	King Racing	Buick
13	5	Ricky Rudd	Hendrick Motorsports	Chevrolet
14	94	Sterling Marlin	Hagan Racing	Oldsmobile
15	66	Dick Trickle	Cale Yarborough Motorsports	Pontiac
16	30	Michael Waltrip	Bahari Racing	Pontiac
17	1	Terry Labonte	Precision Products Racing	Oldsmobile
18	10	Derrike Cope	Whitcomb Racing	Chevrolet
19	33	Harry Gant	Leo Jackson Motorsports	Oldsmobile
20	8	Bobby Hillin Jr.	Stavola Brothers Racing	Buick
21	57	Jimmy Spencer	Osterlund Racing	Pontiac
22	71	Dave Marcis	Marcis Auto Racing	Chevrolet
23	98	Butch Miller	Travis Carter Enterprises	Chevrolet
24	7	Alan Kulwicki	AK Racing	Ford
25	12	Hut Stricklin	Bobby Allison Motorsports	Buick
26	21	Dale Jarrett	Wood Brothers Racing	Ford
27	75	Rick Wilson	RahMoc Enterprises	Oldsmobile
28	2	Troy Beebe	U.S. Racing	Pontiac
29	43	Richard Petty	Petty Enterprises	Pontiac
30	52	Jimmy Means	Jimmy Means Racing	Pontiac
Provisionals
31	47	Jack Pennington (R)	Close Racing	Oldsmobile
32	18	Greg Sacks	Hendrick Motorsports	Chevrolet
33	23	Eddie Bierschwale	B&B Racing	Oldsmobile
34	20	Rob Moroso (R)	Moroso Racing	Oldsmobile
35	83	Lake Speed	Speed Racing	Oldsmobile
36	29	Phil Parsons	Diamond Ridge Motorsports	Pontiac
37	70	J. D. McDuffie	McDuffie Racing	Pontiac
38	35	Bill Venturini	Venturini Motorsports	Chevrolet
39	91	Ed Cooper	Ed Cooper Racing	Oldsmobile
40	89	Rodney Combs	Mueller Brothers Racing	Pontiac
Failed to qualify
41	50	Rich Vogler	RaDiUs Motorsports	Chevrolet
42	77	Ken Ragan	Ragan Racing	Ford
43	34	Charlie Glotzbach	AAG Racing	Buick
44	01	Mickey Gibbs	Gibbs Racing	Ford
Official starting lineup

== Race results ==
Fin	St	#	Driver	Team	Make	Laps	Led	Status	Pts	Winnings
1	5	3	Dale Earnhardt	Richard Childress Racing	Chevrolet	200	22	running	180	$72,950
2	11	4	Ernie Irvan	Morgan–McClure Motorsports	Oldsmobile	200	7	running	175	$41,000
3	4	11	Geoff Bodine	Junior Johnson & Associates	Ford	200	0	running	165	$33,375
4	1	6	Mark Martin	Roush Racing	Ford	200	59	running	165	$25,400
5	19	33	Harry Gant	Leo Jackson Motorsports	Oldsmobile	200	4	running	160	$23,425
6	24	7	Alan Kulwicki	AK Racing	Ford	200	0	running	150	$17,125
7	17	1	Terry Labonte	Precision Products Racing	Oldsmobile	200	0	running	146	$15,550
8	6	42	Kyle Petty	SABCO Racing	Pontiac	200	0	running	142	$17,450
9	13	5	Ricky Rudd	Hendrick Motorsports	Chevrolet	200	0	running	138	$13,800
10	27	75	Rick Wilson	RahMoc Enterprises	Oldsmobile	200	0	running	134	$15,225
11	29	43	Richard Petty	Petty Enterprises	Pontiac	200	0	running	130	$10,375
12	18	10	Derrike Cope	Whitcomb Racing	Chevrolet	200	0	running	127	$13,100
13	2	15	Morgan Shepherd	Bud Moore Engineering	Ford	200	0	running	124	$11,550
14	12	26	Brett Bodine	King Racing	Buick	200	0	running	121	$11,000
15	9	17	Darrell Waltrip	Hendrick Motorsports	Chevrolet	200	0	running	118	$16,525
16	34	20	Rob Moroso (R)	Moroso Racing	Oldsmobile	200	0	running	115	$9,282
17	3	27	Rusty Wallace	Blue Max Racing	Pontiac	200	0	running	112	$18,400
18	14	94	Sterling Marlin	Hagan Racing	Oldsmobile	199	0	running	109	$9,325
19	22	71	Dave Marcis	Marcis Auto Racing	Chevrolet	199	0	running	106	$9,010
20	21	57	Jimmy Spencer	Osterlund Racing	Pontiac	199	0	running	103	$9,470
21	16	30	Michael Waltrip	Bahari Racing	Pontiac	199	0	running	100	$8,450
22	36	29	Phil Parsons	Diamond Ridge Motorsports	Pontiac	199	0	running	97	$5,485
23	23	98	Butch Miller	Travis Carter Enterprises	Chevrolet	198	1	running	99	$6,125
24	15	66	Dick Trickle	Cale Yarborough Motorsports	Pontiac	198	0	running	91	$8,965
25	8	9	Bill Elliott	Melling Racing	Ford	185	102	engine	98	$27,105
26	32	18	Greg Sacks	Hendrick Motorsports	Chevrolet	180	0	running	85	$4,995
27	7	25	Ken Schrader	Hendrick Motorsports	Chevrolet	179	5	engine	87	$12,685
28	20	8	Bobby Hillin Jr.	Stavola Brothers Racing	Buick	164	0	running	79	$7,550
29	33	23	Eddie Bierschwale	B&B Racing	Oldsmobile	151	0	motor mount	76	$4,765
30	38	35	Bill Venturini	Venturini Motorsports	Chevrolet	142	0	camshaft	73	$4,705
31	28	2	Troy Beebe	U.S. Racing	Pontiac	132	0	engine	0	$7,240
32	25	12	Hut Stricklin	Bobby Allison Motorsports	Buick	130	0	engine	67	$5,155
33	35	83	Lake Speed	Speed Racing	Oldsmobile	120	0	wheel studs	64	$4,470
34	26	21	Dale Jarrett	Wood Brothers Racing	Ford	101	0	transmission	61	$7,010
35	39	91	Ed Cooper	Ed Cooper Racing	Oldsmobile	77	0	engine	58	$4,350
36	10	28	Davey Allison	Robert Yates Racing	Ford	65	0	engine	55	$11,310
37	37	70	J. D. McDuffie	McDuffie Racing	Pontiac	57	0	rocker arm	52	$4,285
38	31	47	Jack Pennington (R)	Close Racing	Oldsmobile	54	0	accident	49	$4,510
39	30	52	Jimmy Means	Jimmy Means Racing	Pontiac	28	0	engine	46	$4,250
40	40	89	Rodney Combs	Mueller Brothers Racing	Pontiac	15	0	piston	43	$4,225
Official race results

== Standings after the race ==
Drivers' Championship standings

	Pos	Driver	Points
	1	Mark Martin	2,091
	2	Morgan Shepherd	1,997 (-94)
1	3	Geoff Bodine	1,984 (-107)
1	4	Rusty Wallace	1,975 (–116)
	5	Dale Earnhardt	1,973 (–118)
	6	Kyle Petty	1,875 (–216)
3	7	Ernie Irvan	1,796 (–295)
1	8	Darrell Waltrip	1,777 (–314)
2	9	Ken Schrader	1,760 (–331)
2	10	Bill Elliott	1,759 (–332)
Official driver's standings

- Note: Only the first 10 positions are included for the driver standings.

Previous race: 1990 Miller Genuine Draft 500	NASCAR Winston Cup Series; 1990 season	Next race: 1990 Pepsi 400
