= Fernando Vargas vs. Shane Mosley =

2006 professional boxing match

Showdown
- Date: February 25, 2006
- Venue: Mandalay Bay Events Center, Paradise, Nevada, U.S.
- Title(s) on the line: WBA super welterweight title eliminator

Tale of the tape
Boxer	Fernando Vargas	Shane Mosley
Nickname	Ferocious	Sugar
Hometown	Oxnard, California, U.S.	Pomona, California, U.S.
Purse	$4,000,000	$3,000,000
Pre-fight record	26–2 (22 KO)	41–4 (1) (35 KO)
Age	28 years, 2 months	34 years, 5 months
Height	5 ft 10 in (178 cm)	5 ft 9 in (175 cm)
Weight	153 1/2 lb (70 kg)	152 lb (69 kg)
Style	Orthodox	Orthodox
Recognition	WBA; No. 1 Ranked Light Middleweight; WBC; No. 2 Ranked Light Middleweight; The Ring; No. 4 Ranked Light Middleweight; IBF; No. 5 Ranked Middleweight; 2-time light middleweight champion	WBA; No. 4 Ranked Light Middleweight; WBC; No. 5 Ranked Light Middleweight; IBF; No. 1 Ranked Welterweight; The Ring; No. 4 Ranked Welterweight; 3-division world champion

Result
- Mosley wins via 10th-round technical knockout

Fernando Vargas vs. Shane Mosley, billed as Showdown, was a professional boxing match contested on February 25, 2006. The bout was a WBA super welterweight title eliminator.

== Background ==
In late October 2005, it was reported that negotiations between 3-division world champion Shane Mosley and 2-time light middleweight champion Fernando Vargas had begun for a potential fight between the two in early 2006. Both fighters were looking to get their respective careers back on track as Mosley had lost consecutive light middleweight title fights in 2004 to Ronald "Winky" Wright and had faced marginal competition in 2005 while Vargas has not fought for a world title since losing to Oscar De La Hoya in 2002 and had spent over year out of boxing following a back injury before finally returning in 2005, winning both of his comeback fights that year. Golden Boy Promotions CEO Richard Schaefer, who promoted Mosley, mentioned that in addition to Vargas, Mosley was also looking at facing either Floyd Mayweather Jr. or Zab Judah but mentioned that getting the Mosley–Vargas fight was a priority, stating "the Vargas fight is the right fight for Shane, and that Shane is the right fight for Vargas. So we'll keep talking. Hopefully, we can put it together."

After over a month of negotiations, the bout was made official in late November to take place on February 25, 2006 on HBO pay-per-view. Though Mosley had fought as a welterweight in both of his 2005 fights, the fight was contested at the 154-pound light middleweight limit where Vargas had spent the majority of his professional career.

== Fight Details ==
In what was a close fight, the two fighters were nearly even in punches landed with Mosley having an extremely narrow 147–139 edge though Vargas landed at a slightly higher percentage as he scored on 32% of his 429 thrown punches compared to Mosley's 30% success rate on his 498 thrown punches. However, Mosley scored often with both power punches and jabs to Vargas' left eye from the opening round on causing it to swell and get progressively worse as the fight continued. By the eighth round, the swelling on Vargas' eye had ballooned and was practically shut, leading to the ringside physician to check the wound after the round, though Vargas was allowed to continue the fight. Mosley continued to punish Vargas' eye in the ninth as he landed right hands almost at will. Following the round, referee Joe Cortez, Nevada State Athletic Commission head Marc Ratner and the ringside physician David Watson had a meeting to discuss Vargas' injured eye with the verdict being that the fight would be stopped if he could not withstand Mosley's right handed attack. 1:22 into the tenth round, Mosley landed a big right hand to the eye after which Cortez stepped in and immediately stopped the fight, giving Mosley the victory by technical knockout. At the time of the stoppage, Mosley was ahead on two judge's scorecards 86–85, while Vargas was ahead by the same score on the third. HBO's unofficial ringside scorer Harold Lederman had it 86–85 for Mosley.

== Fight card ==
Confirmed bouts:

Weight Class	Weight		vs.		Method	Round	Notes
Super Welterweight	154 lbs.	Shane Mosley	def.	Fernando Vargas	TKO	10/12	^{note 1}
Bantamweight	118 lbs.	Jhonny González	def.	Mark Johnson	KO	8/12
Heavyweight	200+ lbs.	Calvin Brock	def.	Zuri Lawrence	KO	6/10
Preliminary bouts
Lightweight	135 lbs.	Joel Julio	def.	Wilmer Mejia	RTD	2/6
Light welterweight	140 lbs.	Daniel Cervantes	def.	Derrick Moon	UD	6
Middleweight	160 lbs.	Tomas Padron	def.	DeShaun Cohen	TKO	2/4

^Note 1 WBA Super Welterweight Title Eliminator

== Broadcasting ==
Country	Broadcaster
United States	HBO

Preceded by vs. Javier Castillejo	Fernando Vargas's bouts 25 February 2006	Succeeded by Rematch
Preceded by vs. José Luis Cruz	Shane Mosley's bouts 25 February 2006	Succeeded by Rematch
