= Ross Thompson (boxer) =

American boxer

Personal information
- Nickname: The Boss
- Nationality: American
- Born: Ross J. Thompson; June 2, 1973 (age 53) Buffalo, New York, U.S.
- Height: 5 ft 9 in (175 cm)
- Weight: Heavyweight; Cruiserweight; Middleweight; Light middleweight

Boxing career
- Reach: 69 in (175 cm)
- Stance: Orthodox

Boxing record
- Total fights: 46
- Wins: 27
- Win by KO: 18
- Losses: 16
- Draws: 3

Ross J. Thompson (born June 2, 1973) is an American retired professional boxer from Buffalo, New York.

== Amateur career ==
In 1991 he won the national golden gloves and the us Olympic festival.

Thompson was a 5x national champion as an amateur.

== Professional career ==
In 1996 he won the NABA welterweight title and in 1999 he won the WBA North American jr middleweight title.

In 2000, he lost to Fernando Vargas for the International Boxing Federation super welterweight title.

In 2001, he lost to Eric Mitchell for the North American Boxing Association middleweight title.

In 2002 he won the wbc continental americas title at super middleweight

In 2002, he lost to future world champion Jeff Lacy. In 2002 he won the wbc continental americas title at super middleweight

In 2004, he lost to both Kelly Pavlik and Antwun Echols.

== Professional boxing record ==
46 fights	27 wins	16 losses
By knockout	18	3
By decision	9	11
By disqualification	0	2
Draws	3	
