= Oscar De La Hoya vs. Fernando Vargas =

Boxing match

Bad Blood
- Date: September 14, 2002
- Venue: Mandalay Bay Events Center, Paradise, Nevada, U.S.
- Title(s) on the line: WBC, WBA, IBA and vacant The Ring light middleweight titles

Tale of the tape
Boxer	Oscar De La Hoya	Fernando Vargas
Nickname	The Golden Boy	Ferocious
Hometown	East Los Angeles, California, U.S.	Oxnard, California, U.S.
Purse	$15,000,000	$6,000,000
Pre-fight record	34–2 (27 KO)	22–1 (20 KO)
Age	29 years, 7 months	24 years, 9 months
Height	5 ft 10 1/2 in (179 cm)	5 ft 10 in (178 cm)
Weight	154 lb (70 kg)	154 lb (70 kg)
Style	Orthodox	Orthodox
Recognition	WBC; Light Middleweight Champion; The Ring No. 7 ranked pound-for-pound fighter 4-division world champion	WBA and IBA; Light Middleweight Champion

Result
- De La Hoya wins via 11th-round TKO

Oscar De La Hoya vs. Fernando Vargas, billed as Bad Blood, was a professional boxing match contested on September 14, 2002, for the WBC, WBA and the vacant The Ring light middleweight championship.

== Background ==
The long-awaited De La Hoya–Vargas bout had been discussed for years. The fight was highly anticipated as not only were De La Hoya and Vargas two of the top fighters in the sport, they also had a long-going personal feud and openly discussed their hatred for one another. The rivalry was rumored to have stemmed from an incident in which Vargas, while working out at De La Hoya's boxing camp in 1993, supposedly slipped and fell in a snowbank while jogging. When Vargas spotted De La Hoya behind him, he reached out his arm hoping for some help, but De La Hoya simply laughed and continued on, angering Vargas, who held a grudge ever since.

In June 2001, De La Hoya defeated Javier Castillejo to claim the WBC and lineal light–middleweight title, his fifth major world title in his fourth different weight class (fifth overall). After De La Hoya's victory and after years of bad-mouthing each other, a fight between him and Vargas looked to finally be set for December 8, 2001, but negotiations fell through in August of that year after De La Hoya withdrew his proposal when the two sides couldn't agree on a deal after two weeks of talks. Despite their proposed fight in late 2001 falling through, the two sides continued to negotiate for months afterward before they reached an agreement in January 2002 for a May 4 bout. However, De La Hoya pulled out of the fight a month before it was to take place after sustaining an injury to his left hand, and a week later, the fight was rescheduled for September 14.

== The Fight ==
The fight was largely back and forth, with each fighter trading rounds throughout the first six rounds. Vargas was able to bloody De La Hoya's nose after an impressive fifth round; however, De La Hoya stormed back to take rounds six through eight and opened a gash under Vargas' right eye. Vargas regained his form in round nine, but De La Hoya turned up his offense in round 10 and stunned Vargas with a left hook to the head and a combination to the body just before the round ended. In the 11th round, De La Hoya continued to attack Vargas and with just over a minute gone by, sent him down with a left hook. Vargas got up and continued with the fight, but De La Hoya continued his assault, eventually getting Vargas into a corner and unleashing a flurry of punches. As Vargas was not offering much resistance, the referee stepped in and stopped the fight at 1:48, giving De La Hoya the victory by technical knockout.

== Aftermath ==
Though Vargas expressed his desire for a rematch with De Le Hoya during his post-fight interview, a drug test that was administered the night of the fight revealed that he had tested positive for anabolic steroids. As a result, Vargas was issued a nine-month suspension by the Nevada Athletic Commission a month later. After serving his suspension, Vargas returned on July 26, 2003, with a knockout victory over Fitz Vanderpool. De La Hoya, meanwhile, would next defend his titles against Luis Ramon Campas on May 3, 2003, winning by seventh-round technical knockout, but losing the titles to Shane Mosley in his next fight on September 13.

In 2005, there were talks of a rematch between the two. De La Hoya expressed interest in the bout, provided that Vargas take a pre-fight drug test to prove he was clean. However, De La Hoya opted to challenge WBC super welterweight champion Ricardo Mayorga instead (a fight in which De La Hoya prevailed).

== Undercard ==
Confirmed bouts:

== Broadcasting ==
Country	Broadcaster
Australia	Main Event
United Kingdom	BBC (Delayed)
United States	HBO

Preceded by vs. Javier Castillejo	Oscar De La Hoya's bouts 14 September 2002	Succeeded by vs. Yori Boy Campas
Preceded by vs. Jose Flores	Fernando Vargas's bouts 14 September 2002	Succeeded by vs. Fitz Vanderpool
