= Oscar De La Hoya vs. Ricardo Mayorga =

Boxing competition

Danger Zone
- Date: May 6, 2006
- Venue: MGM Grand Garden Arena, Paradise, Nevada, U.S.
- Title(s) on the line: WBC super welterweight title

Tale of the tape
Boxer	Oscar De La Hoya	Ricardo Mayorga
Nickname	The Golden Boy	El Matador ("The Killer")
Hometown	East Los Angeles, California, U.S.	Masaya, Masaya, Nicaragua
Purse	$8,000,000	$2,000,000
Pre-fight record	37–4 (29 KO)	27–5–1 (22 KO)
Age	33 years, 3 months	32 years, 7 months
Height	5 ft 10 1/2 in (179 cm)	5 ft 9 in (175 cm)
Weight	153 1/2 lb (70 kg)	153 1/2 lb (70 kg)
Style	Orthodox	Orthodox
Recognition	6-division world champion	WBC super welterweight champion 2-division world champion

Result
- De La Hoya wins via 6th-round TKO

Oscar De La Hoya vs. Ricardo Mayorga, billed as Danger Zone, was a professional boxing match contested on May 6, 2006 for the WBC super welterweight title.

== Background ==
Oscar De La Hoya's previous fight had taken place on September 18, 2004. De La Hoya, then the WBO middleweight champion, met undisputed middleweight champion Bernard Hopkins, who held the other three major middleweight titles of WBA, WBC and IBF and had not lost a fight in 11 years. Though De La Hoya - who was participating in only his second middleweight fight - held his own with the more experienced Hopkins (who had spent his entire 16-year career in the middleweight division at the time of the fight) through the first eight rounds, he would ultimately lose by knockout in the ninth round after catching a shot to the liver. There had been rumors of De La Hoya possibly retiring after the loss to Hopkins, but De La Hoya hinted that he would continue his career, stating that he was a "better fighter than what I showed". De La Hoya then took a 20-month hiatus, sitting out all of 2005, before announcing in January 2006 that he would return to the light–middleweight division to challenge Ricardo Mayorga for the WBC light-middleweight title in May of that year.

The pre–fight hype included months of intense trash-talk, mostly from Mayorga, and incidents in which the two fighters had to be separated to prevent a brawl from erupting. The antics started in February when the two were involved in a shoving match while in California filming a commercial to promote their fight. Things would only intensify as Mayorga would continue to bash De La Hoya at their first press conference. Among Mayorga's many insults were accusing De La Hoya of taking a dive in his match with Hopkins, calling him a "faggot", insulting both De La Hoya's wife and son, making crotch grabbing gestures towards De La Hoya and his fans and vowing to make De La Hoya "his bitch." Mayorga also threatened to pull out of the fight only days before it was to happen if he did not receive more money. However, he rescinded his threat after his promoter Don King increased his $2 million purse by another $500,000.

== The Fight ==
Despite Mayorga's brazen claims--which continued even when the two had entered the ring, when Mayorga referred to De La Hoya's trainer Floyd Mayweather Sr. as "a monkey"--and De La Hoya's lengthy absence from boxing, De La Hoya dominated almost the entire fight from the opening bell on. Mayorga threw 333 punches during the fight, but had difficulty landing them as De La Hoya's defense limited Mayorga to landing just 58 punches for an abysmal 17% rate. The other compubox punch stats were even more lopsided in De La Hoya's favor. Mayorga only landed 6 of 136 jabs for a meager 4% and 26% of his power punches, De La Hoya, meanwhile, had a 44% success rate in all three categories. De La Hoya also scored two knockdowns in the fight, the first of which came less than two minutes into the first round after a right–left combination briefly sent Mayorga down. In the sixth, De La Hoya sent Mayorga down to his knees for the second knockdown after unleashing two consecutive four-punch combinations. Mayorga would get up and continue, but was soon met with a furious rally from De La Hoya, who landed a 20–punch combination before the referee stepped in and ended the fight at 1:25 of the sixth round.

== Aftermath ==
De La Hoya's victory would once again make him the WBC light–middleweight champion and talks of a superfight with the unbeaten WBC welterweight champion Floyd Mayweather Jr., who was also the number-one ranked pound-for-pound fighter in boxing, began almost immediately after his fight with Mayorga. The fight was originally tagged for the fall of 2006, but De La Hoya would not fight for the remainder of 2006 as negotiations dragged on before both sides were finally able to reach an agreement in November 2006 for a May 5, 2007 fight.

== Undercard ==
Confirmed bouts:

== Broadcasting ==
Country	Broadcaster
United Kingdom	Sky Sports
United States	HBO

Preceded by vs. Michele Piccirillo	Ricardo Mayorga's bouts 6 May 2006	Succeeded by vs. Fernando Vargas
Preceded by vs. Bernard Hopkins	Oscar De La Hoya's bouts 6 May 2006	Succeeded by vs. Floyd Mayweather Jr.
