= Shane Mosley vs. Fernando Vargas II =

Boxing match

The Rematch
- Date: July 15, 2006
- Venue: MGM Grand Garden Arena, Paradise, Nevada, U.S.

Tale of the tape
Boxer	Shane Mosley	Fernando Vargas
Nickname	Sugar	Ferocious
Hometown	Pomona, California, U.S.	Oxnard, California, U.S.
Purse	$4,000,000	$3,000,000
Pre-fight record	42–4 (1) (36 KO)	26–3 (22 KO)
Age	34 years, 10 months	28 years, 7 months
Height	5 ft 9 in (175 cm)	5 ft 10 in (178 cm)
Weight	153 lb (69 kg)	154 lb (70 kg)
Style	Orthodox	Orthodox
Recognition	WBC/WBA; No. 1 Ranked Light Middleweight; IBF; No. 5 Ranked Light Middleweight; The Ring; No. 3 Ranked Light Middleweight; 3-division world champion	WBC; No. 2 Ranked Light Middleweight; WBA; No. 8 Ranked Light Middleweight; IBF; No. 9 Ranked Light Middleweight; The Ring; No. 6 Ranked Light Middleweight; 2-time light middleweight champion

Result
- Mosley wins via 6th-round technical knockout

Shane Mosley vs. Fernando Vargas II, billed as The Rematch, was a professional boxing match contested on July 15, 2006.

== Background ==
Mosley and Vargas had first fought five months prior. In what was a close fight, the two fighters was separated by a single point on all three official scorecards heading into the tenth round when a serious eye injury sustained by Vargas early in the fight resulted in the bout being called 1:22 into the round, giving Mosley the victory by technical knockout. Vargas caused a scene during the post-fight press conference, angrily confronting Mosley's wife Jin and demanding a rematch, which resulted in Jin and Vargas' wife Martha getting into a verbal altercation and being restrained by security. Prior to the ruckus, Vargas' manager Shelly Finkel assured the parties involved that he would discuss a rematch with Mosley's promoter, Golden Boy Promotions head Richard Schaefer, and Vargas' promoter, Kathy Duva of Main Events. On April 30, 2006, Golden Boy Promotions and Main Events held a press conference announcing that the rematch would indeed take place in July of that year at the MGM Grand Garden Arena. Golden Boy Promotions president and mutual opponent of Mosley and Vargas stated that the first fight "was one of those fights that was so good that you have to see it again."

Just over a week after the fight was announced, Mosley announced that he would reunite with his father and longtime trainer Jack, whom he had parted ways with two years earlier after losing to Ronald "Winky" Wright for the first time. Jack Mosley was replacing John David Jackson, who had trained Mosley for his four prior fights, as Jackson had joined Bernard Hopkins' camp and was busy training him for his June fight with Antonio Tarver and thus unavailable to train Mosley for the rematch against Vargas.

== Fight Details ==
Mosley, showcasing superior quickness and hand speed, dominated Vargas through the entire duration of the fight. Mosley landed 136 punches through six rounds which was twice as much as Vargas who only managed to land 68 total punches. Like their previous fight, Mosley caused an injury over Vargas' eye, this time the right eye, in the fifth as a repeated left hooks caused a cut to open up above Vargas' right eye. One round later, the fight came to an end when, with 50 seconds remaining in the round, a Mosley left hook caught Vargas flush and sent him down. Vargas attempted to get back up right away, but struggled mightily, though he managed to just beat referee Kenny Bayless's 10-count. Vargas was allowed to continue, but was met with a furious Mosley barrage as Bayless stepped in and ended the fight. Mosley was named the winner by technical knockout at 2:38 of the sixth round.

== Fight card ==
Confirmed bouts:

Weight Class	Weight		vs.		Method	Round	Notes
Super Welterweight	154 lbs.	Shane Mosley	def.	Fernando Vargas	TKO	6/12
Bantamweight	118 lbs.	Daniel Ponce de León	def.	Sod Kokietgym	KO	1/12	^{note 1}
Lightweight	135 lbs.	Juan Díaz	def.	Randy Suico	TKO	9/12	^{note 2}
Preliminary bouts
Welterweight	147 lbs.	Ben Tackie	def.	Wilfredo Negrón	TKO	9/10
Super Lightweight	140 lbs.	Anthony Salcido	vs.	Enrique Colin	D	6/6
Featherweight	126 lbs.	Jonathan Oquendo	def.	Arturo Bracamontes	TKO	4/6
Welterweight	147 lbs.	Euri González	def.	Cesar Valentin	TKO	2/6
Welterweight	147 lbs.	Rock Allen	def.	Henry Mitchell	UD	4/4

^Note 1 For WBO Bantamweight title
^Note 2 For WBA Lightweight title

== Broadcasting ==
Country	Broadcaster
United States	HBO

Preceded by First bout	Shane Mosley's bouts 15 July 2006	Succeeded by vs. Luis Collazo
Preceded by First bout	Fernando Vargas's bouts 15 July 2006	Succeeded by vs. Ricardo Mayorga
