= Oscar De La Hoya vs. Wilfredo Rivera =

Boxing match

Title Wave
- Date: December 6, 1997
- Venue: Caesars Atlantic City, Atlantic City, New Jersey, U.S.
- Title on the line: WBC welterweight title

Tale of the tape
Boxer	Oscar De La Hoya	Wilfredo Rivera
Nickname	The Golden Boy	
Hometown	East Los Angeles, California, U.S.	San Juan, Puerto Rico
Purse	$6,000,000	$350,000
Pre-fight record	26–0 (21 KO)	27–2–1 (18 KO)
Age	24 years, 10 months	28 years, 7 months
Height	5 ft 11 in (180 cm)	5 ft 11 in (180 cm)
Weight	147 lb (67 kg)	147 lb (67 kg)
Style	Orthodox	Orthodox
Recognition	WBC; Welterweight Champion; The Ring No. 1 ranked pound-for-pound fighter The Ring; No. 1 Ranked Welterweight; 3-division world champion	WBC; No. 4 Ranked Welterweight; The Ring; No. 8 Ranked Welterweight

Result
- De La Hoya wins via 8th-round technical knockout

Oscar De La Hoya vs. Wilfredo Rivera, billed as Title Wave, was a professional boxing match contested on December 6, 1997, for the WBC welterweight title.

== Background ==
Just two days after his victory over Héctor Camacho in September 1997, it was announced that WBC welterweight champion Oscar De La Hoya's next title defense would come just under three months later on December 6 against Wilfredo Rivera, the WBC's number-four ranked welterweight contender.

Just weeks before the fight, renowned trainer Emanuel Steward, who had trained De La Hoya for his two previous fights against Camacho and David Kamau was dismissed by De La Hoya's camp after it was deemed that Steward, who was simultaneously training WBC heavyweight champion Lennox Lewis, was not spending as much time training De La Hoya for his fight against Rivera. Instead, legendary 75-year old trainer Gil Clancy was brought out of a 20-year retirement and hired as Steward's replacement by De La Hoya. Steward revealed that the reason for his dismissal was a "family situation" as De La Hoya's father Joel, felt that Steward should have had De La Hoya sparring no less than 125 rounds during training, a tactic Steward felt was "crazy" as De La Hoya had already fought four times during the course of the year.

The featured undercard bout featured reigning WBC super welterweight champion Terry Norris defending his title against Keith Mullings, a journeyman fighter who sported a 1–4–1 record in his last six fights. Norris, a heavy 7–1 favorite, was reportedly set to drop down in weight to face De La Hoya the following year for a reported $4.5 million payday after his expected victory over Mullings and assuming De La Hoya would next defeat his mandatory challenger Patrick Charpentier. However, Norris, after controlling the early portion of his fight against Mullings, was knocked down late in the eighth round and then had the fight stopped in the ninth following a brutal assault from Mullings, costing him the De La Hoya fight.

== The fight ==
Though Rivera was a game opponent, De La Hoya controlled nearly the entire fight from the opening round. De La Hoya, having staggered Rivera with a left hook in the second round, followed up with another that opened up a gash over Rivera's right eye, which would hinder him throughout the remainder of the bout. Then in the fourth round, De La Hoya sent Rivera down with a sharp right hand. Rivera was able to answer the referee's 10-count at five, but the gash above his right eye, which his corner had managed to close, was reopened and another cut was opened on his right cheek. Rivera would survive until the eighth round, when the fight was stopped after the ringside doctor concluded that Rivera could not continue due the cuts he had suffered.

== Fight card ==
Confirmed bouts:

Weight Class	Weight		vs.		Method	Round	Notes
Welterweight	147 lbs.	Oscar De La Hoya (c)	def.	Wilfredo Rivera	TKO	8/12	^{Note 1}
Super Welterweight	154 lbs.	Keith Mullings	def.	Terry Norris (c)	TKO	9/12	^{Note 2}
Super Welterweight	154 lbs.	Yori Boy Campas	def.	Raúl Márquez (c)	TKO	8/12
Cruiserweight	190 lbs.	Vassiliy Jirov	def.	Art Jimmerson	TKO	2/10
Super Welterweight	154 lbs.	Daniel Santos	def.	Jerry Booker	TKO	3/8
Super Featherweight	130 lbs.	Zahir Raheem	def.	Terry Smith	TKO	4/6
Heavyweight	200+ lbs.	Eric Esch	def.	Doug Phillips	UD	4/4

^Note 1 For WBC Welterweight title
^Note 2 For WBC Super Welterweight title
^Note 3 For IBF Junior Middleweight title

== Broadcasting ==
Country	Broadcaster
United States	HBO

Preceded by vs. Héctor Camacho	Oscar De La Hoya's bouts 6 December 1997	Succeeded by vs. Patrick Charpentier
Preceded by vs. Mark Hammon	Wilfredo Rivera's bouts 6 December 1997	Succeeded by vs. Carlos Palomino
