= Oscar De La Hoya vs. Julio César Chávez II =

Boxing match

Ultimate Revenge
- Date: September 18, 1998
- Venue: Thomas & Mack Center, Paradise, Nevada, U.S.
- Title(s) on the line: WBC welterweight title

Tale of the tape
Boxer	Oscar De La Hoya	Julio César Chávez
Nickname	"The Golden Boy"	"J.C."
Hometown	East Los Angeles, California, U.S.	Ciudad Obregón, Sonora, Mexico
Purse	$12,000,000	$6,000,000
Pre-fight record	28–0 (23 KO)	100–2–2 (84 KO)
Age	25 years, 7 months	36 years, 2 months
Height	5 ft 11 in (180 cm)	5 ft 7 1/2 in (171 cm)
Weight	146 1/2 lb (66 kg)	144 1/2 lb (66 kg)
Style	Orthodox	Orthodox
Recognition	WBC; Welterweight Champion; The Ring No. 1 ranked pound-for-pound fighter 3-division world champion	WBC; No. 2 Ranked Welterweight; 3-division world champion

Result
- De La Hoya wins via 8th–round RTD

Oscar De La Hoya vs. Julio César Chávez II, billed as Ultimate Revenge, was a professional boxing match contested on September 18, 1998 for the WBC welterweight championship.

== Background ==
De La Hoya and Chavez had previously fought each other over two years earlier on June 7, 1996 for Chavez's WBC super lightweight title. In a highly–anticipated matchup, De La Hoya dominated the aging champion, winning the first three rounds on all three judge's scorecards before the fight was stopped in the fourth round due to a large gash Chavez had received over his eye after a De La Hoya right hand. In spite of De La Hoya's dominating victory, Chavez remained defiant, giving De La Hoya little credit, stating that his punches had not hurt him and solely blaming the loss on his lack of vision due to the gash. Chavez demanded a rematch as a result, but an immediate rematch could not take place as De La Hoya already had a mandatory defense lined up (which would prove to be against Miguel Ángel González in January 1997) before facing Pernell Whitaker in a super fight for Whitaker's welterweight title. De La Hoya would defeat Whitaker to capture the title and then go on to successfully defend it three times before a rematch with Chavez was announced in April 1998. The bout was contingent on both De La Hoya and Chavez winning their tune–up fights against Patrick Charpentier and Ken Sigurani respectively, which both men did, officially putting their rematch on.

== The fight ==
De La Hoya would ultimately defeat Chavez once again after Chavez's corner opted to end the fight between the eighth and ninth rounds, officially giving De La Hoya the victory by referee technical knockout at 3:00 of the eighth round. Unlike the first fight in which Chavez was injured early in the first round and was unable to keep up with the younger and faster De La Hoya, Chavez was much more competitive this time around. The two fighters fought several close rounds though at the time of the stoppage De La Hoya had the clear advantage as one judge had him ahead by the score of 79–73 (seven rounds to one) while the other two judges scored the fight 78–75 (five rounds to two, one even). De La Hoya opened up a small cut above Chavez's left eye, the same one that had been injured in their previous fight, though it did not deteriorate any further like in the first fight. The fight's eighth and final round was action-packed, as both fighters traded shots and threw a combined 173 punches with De La Hoya landing 45 to Chavez's 38. However, as in the first fight, Chavez took a brutal beating and was forced to quit on his stool due to all the damage he had received through the entire contest.

== Undercard ==
Confirmed bouts:

== Broadcasting ==
Country	Broadcaster
United States	HBO
Thailand	Channel 7

Preceded by vs. Patrick Charpentier	Oscar De La Hoya's bouts 18 September 1998	Succeeded by vs. Ike Quartey
Preceded by vs. Ken Sigurani	Julio César Chávez's bouts 18 September 1998	Succeeded by vs. Verdell Smith
