= Oscar De La Hoya vs. Patrick Charpentier =

Oscar Night at the Sun Bowl
- Date: June 13, 1998
- Venue: Sun Bowl, El Paso, Texas, U.S.
- Title(s) on the line: WBC welterweight title

Tale of the tape
| Boxer | Oscar De La Hoya | Patrick Charpentier |
| Nickname | The Golden Boy | |
| Hometown | East Los Angeles, California, U.S. | Vimoutiers, France |
| Purse | $4,000,000 | $600,000 |
| Pre-fight record | 27–0 (22 KO) | 27–4–1 (23 KO) |
| Age | 25 years, 4 months | 27 years, 11 months |
| Height | 5 ft 11 in (180 cm) | 5 ft 8 in (173 cm) |
| Weight | 147 lb (67 kg) | 146 lb (66 kg) |
| Style | Orthodox | Orthodox |
| Recognition | WBC; Welterweight Champion | WBC; No. 1 Ranked Welterweight |

Result
- De La Hoya wins via 3rd-round technical knockout

Oscar De La Hoya vs. Patrick Charpentier, billed as Oscar Night at the Sun Bowl, was a professional boxing match contested on June 13, 1998, for the WBC welterweight title.

== Background ==
After defeating Wilfredo Rivera in his previous fight on December 6, 1997, reigning WBC welterweight champion Oscar De La Hoya's next title defense was announced to take place the following year on February 28 against his mandatory challenger, the virtually unknown French fighter Patrick Charpentier at the Trump Taj Mahal in Atlantic City, New Jersey. Charpentier entered the fight as an overwhelming 20–1 underdog.

However, De La Hoya injured his left wrist while sparring at his training camp in late January, and two weeks later, after itDe La Hoya's injury was diagnosed as a sprain, the fight was postponed until March 14. Only a week later, De La Hoya's injury was revealed to actually be cartilage tear rather than a sprain, forcing the fight to be postponed again until June 13. Though Donald Trump, the then-owner of the Taj Mahal, was interested in keeping the bout at his venue, promoter Bob Arum and Texas-based boxing coordinator Lester Bedford outbid him $1.3 million to $900,000 in order to stage the fight at the Sun Bowl in El Paso, Texas.

The outdoor event was plagued by high, gusty winds that, for a time, threatened to stop the production all together. After the first undercard fight between Verdell Smith and Marty Jakubowski, the event was stopped and the ringside area was evacuated as the winds threatened to collapse the lights above the ring. After a 30-minute postponement, the lights were lowered halfway and the event continued without further incident.

== The Fight ==
De La Hoya dominated Charpentier through three rounds, easily winning rounds one and two before dropping his overmatched opponent three times in the third round en route to a technical knockout. De La Hoya's first knockdown came 53 seconds into the round with a left-right combination, though Charpentier would answer the referee's 10-count, De La Hoya again sent him down 37 seconds later with a left uppercut. A clearly dazed Charpentier again struggled his feet to beat the count, but after a De La Hoya right sent him down for the third time, the fight was immediately stopped.

== Fight card ==
Confirmed bouts:

| Weight Class | Weight | | vs. | | Method | Round | Notes |
|---|---|---|---|---|---|---|---|
| Welterweight | 147 lbs. | Oscar De La Hoya (c) | def. | Patrick Charpentier | TKO | 3/12 | ^{Note 1} |
| Lightweight | 135 lbs. | César Bazán | def. | Stevie Johnston (c) | SD | 12/12 | ^{Note 2} |
| Featherweight | 126 lbs. | César Soto | def. | Juan Polo Pérez | TKO | 2/10 |
| Super Welterweight | 154 lbs. | Daniel Santos | def. | Juan Carlos Rodriguez | TKO | 5/10 |
| Super Welterweight | 154 lbs. | Marty Jakubowski | def. | Verdell Smith | UD | 4/4 |

^Note 1 For WBC Welterweight title
^Note 2 For WBC Lightweight title

== Broadcasting ==
| Country | Broadcaster |
|---|---|
| United States | HBO |
| Thailand | Channel 3 |

| Preceded by vs. Wilfredo Rivera | Oscar De La Hoya's bouts 13 June 1998 | Succeeded by vs. Julio César Chávez II |
| Preceded by vs. Rene Uranga | Patrick Charpentier's bouts 13 June 1998 | Retired |
