= Pernell Whitaker vs. Oscar De La Hoya =

Boxing match

Pound for Pound
- Date: April 12, 1997
- Venue: Thomas & Mack Center, Paradise, Nevada, U.S.
- Title(s) on the line: WBC welterweight title

Tale of the tape
Boxer	Pernell Whitaker	Oscar De La Hoya
Nickname	Sweet Pea	The Golden Boy
Hometown	Norfolk, Virginia, U.S.	East Los Angeles, California, U.S.
Purse	$10,000,000	$6,000,000
Pre-fight record	40–1–1 (17 KO)	23–0 (20 KO)
Age	33 years, 3 months	24 years, 2 months
Height	5 ft 6 in (168 cm)	5 ft 10 in (178 cm)
Weight	146 1/2 lb (66 kg)	146 1/2 lb (66 kg)
Style	Southpaw	Orthodox
Recognition	WBC; Welterweight Champion; The Ring No. 2 ranked pound-for-pound fighter 4-division world champion	WBC; Super Lightweight Champion; The Ring No. 3 ranked pound-for-pound fighter 2-division world champion

Result
- De La Hoya wins via 12-round unanimous decision (116-110, 116-110, 115-111)

Pernell Whitaker vs. Oscar De La Hoya, billed as Pound for Pound, was a professional boxing match contested on April 12, 1997 for the WBC welterweight championship.

== Background ==
The bout featured a matchup of two of the top ranked pound-for-pound fighters in boxing. 33-year-old Pernell Whitaker had been the WBC welterweight champion for four years, captured world titles in four different divisions and had been among the top pound-for-pound fighters in the sport since 1989, with The Ring magazine listing him number one in their annual pound-for-pound rankings for three consecutive years from 1993 to 1995. He was also recognized as the lineal welterweight champion. The 24–year old Oscar De La Hoya was a perfect 23–0, had already become a three-division world champion and was reigning WBC super lightweight champion, which he had won the previous year after defeating Mexican legend Julio César Chávez. At the time of their fight, De La Hoya and Whitaker were the number two and three ranked pound-for-pound fighters, with only the then-WBC light heavyweight champion Roy Jones Jr. ahead of them.

Plans for the mega-fight had been discussed since De La Hoya's victory over Chávez. The bout was all but set in early 1997, though both De La Hoya and Whitaker would first have to get past their mandatory challengers. De La Hoya would make the first, and only, defense of his super lightweight title against the undefeated Miguel Ángel González, while Whitaker would meet Diosbelys Hurtado, who was also unbeaten, in a welterweight title match the following week De La Hoya would have little trouble with Gonzalez, scoring a lopsided unanimous decision victory and putting the pressure squarely on Whitaker. Whitaker, however, would have difficulty with Hurtado. Hurtado scored two knockdowns and was ahead on all three official scorecards when Whitaker rallied in the 11th round, scoring 10 unanswered left hooks to Hurtado's head before the referee stopped the fight and awarded Whitaker the technical knockout victory, officially putting the Whitaker–De La Hoya match on.

Champion Whitaker was 3 to 1 underdog.

== The fight ==
In the third round, De La Hoya suffered a cut under his right eye from an accidental headbutt. As a result of then WBC rules Whitaker had a point deducted. Whitaker would scored the fight's lone knockdown, as he caught De La Hoya off balance with a left hook late in the ninth round, De La Hoya quickly rose up as if he had slipped, but referee Mills Lane correctly ruled it as knockdown.

In a very close fight, De La Hoya was awarded the bout by unanimous decision with two scores of 116–110 and 115–111, however, most ringside observers & sportswriters felt that Whitaker won the fight. HBO's unofficial scorer Harold Lederman had 114–112 and the Associated Press scored it 114–113 both for De La Hoya.

Whitaker outpunched De La Hoya, landing 232 punches to De La Hoya's 191 and dominated with his jab, scoring 160 while De La Hoya only landed 45. Though De La Hoya did not land as many punches or jabs as Whitaker, he had a distinct advantage in power punches, landing 146 to Whitaker's 72, which may have swayed the judges in his favor. It was yet another disputed decision against Whitaker, but not considered a blatant robbery like his loss to Jose Luis Ramirez or his draw with Julio Cesar Chavez.

== Aftermath ==
Whitaker did not agree with the decision, stating that he "could not have performed better" and he felt the decision should have been a "blowout" in his favor.

Even before their match, Whitaker stated that, win or lose, he wanted a rematch with De La Hoya, and after his loss, he would repeat that sentiment. De La Hoya initially was in favor this, stating that he would give Whitaker a rematch "any time, any place." However, these plans were shot down by De La Hoya's promoter Bob Arum, who said that a rematch wouldn't be "good business."

Oscar De La Hoya would remain the WBC Welterweight champion for over two years, making seven successful title defenses, the most defenses De La Hoya would make in any of the eight weight classes he competed in. His reign came to an end on September 18, 1999 when he was defeated by Félix Trinidad via a controversial majority decision.

Whitaker would return on October 17, 1997 to take on obscure Russian fighter Andrey Pestryayev, who was the number one ranked welterweight by the WBA in an "eliminator" bout to determine who would next face their welterweight champion Ike Quartey. Originally, Whitaker would win the fight by a close unanimous decision and a WBA title match with Quartey was set for April 25, 1998. However, the result was changed to a no contest when Whitaker tested positive for cocaine, costing him his victory and earning him a six-month suspension. The WBA lifted the ban in February and agreed to let Whitaker continue forward with his title match with Quartey, provided that Whitaker submit to random drug testing over a six-month period, to which Whitaker agreed. However, Whitaker would fail another drug test shortly after and his title match was cancelled. Whitaker would then enter a drug rehabilitation center and would not fight at all in 1998. He would finally return on February 20, 1999 to challenge Félix Trinidad for the IBF welterweight title. In what would be his final title match, Whitaker would lose by unanimous decision.

== Undercard ==
Confirmed bouts:

Winner	Loser	Weight division/title belt(s) disputed	Result
(United States) Micky Ward	(Mexico) Alfonso Sanchez	Light welterweight (10 rounds)	7th round KO.
(United States) Eric Esch	(United States) Ed White	Heavyweight (4 rounds)	2nd round TKO.
(United States) Floyd Mayweather Jr	(United States) Bobby Giepert	Super featherweight (6 rounds)	1st round TKO.
(United States) Paulie Ayala	(Mexico) Nestor Lopez	Super bantamweight (10 rounds)	Unanimous decision
Non-TV bouts
(United States) Ronald Weaver	(United States) Kevin Lowther	Light middleweight (6 rounds)	Majority decision
(Puerto Rico) Eric Morel	(United States) Jesus Lopez	Super flyweight (4 rounds)	Unanimous decision
(United States) Gary Bell	(Mexico) Cesar Rendon	Heavyweight (4 rounds)	3rd round TKO.

== Broadcasting ==
Country	Broadcaster
United States	HBO
Thailand	Channel 7

Preceded by vs. Diosbelys Hurtado	Pernell Whitaker's bouts 12 April 1997	Succeeded by vs. Andrey Pestryayev
Preceded by vs. Miguel Ángel González	Oscar De La Hoya's bouts 12 April 1997	Succeeded by vs. David Kamau
