= Fernando Vargas vs. Ike Quartey =

Boxing match

Two Warriors, One War
- Date: April 15, 2000
- Venue: Mandalay Bay Events Center, Paradise, Nevada, U.S.
- Title(s) on the line: IBF light middleweight title

Tale of the tape
Boxer	Fernando Vargas	Ike Quartey
Nickname	Ferocious	The Bazooka
Hometown	Oxnard, California, U.S.	Accra, Ghana
Purse	$1,350,000	$1,250,000
Pre-fight record	18–0 (17 KO)	34–1–1 (29 KO)
Age	22 years, 4 months	30 years, 4 months
Height	5 ft 10 in (178 cm)	5 ft 8 in (173 cm)
Weight	153 lb (69 kg)	152 lb (69 kg)
Style	Orthodox	Orthodox
Recognition	IBF; Light Middleweight Champion	IBF; No. 2 Ranked Light Middleweight; The Ring; No. 3 Ranked Welterweight; Former welterweight champion

Result
- Fernando Vargas wins by unanimous decision (116-111, 116-111, 114-113)

Fernando Vargas vs. Ike Quartey, billed as Two Warriors, One War, was a professional boxing match contested on April 15 2000 for the IBF light middleweight championship.

== Background ==
Reigning IBF light-middleweight champion Fernando Vargas coming with his fight with Winky Wright it was his first decision win in his career, but knocked out Raul Marquez, and Howard Clarke out in his previous fights. Meanwhile, Quartey would come back after a 14 months after his first professional loss vs. Oscar De la Hoya and his draw over Lopez but Quartey knocked out Ralph Jones, beat Oba Carr by majority decision and knocked Vince Phillips in round number 3. The fight was signed for April 15.

Vargas was a 2 to 1 favourite to win.

== The fight ==
Round 1-3

Vargas started the fight fast and aggressively, as expected from the young, powerful fighter. He immediately looked for an opening, with his signature fast and hard punches. Quartey, on the other hand, played his usual strategy of keeping his distance and using his long jab to keep his opponent at bay. Quartey was technical and known for his sturdy defense and controlled attack. In the first three rounds, Vargas was the dominant figure as he landed more punches and kept trying to break through Quartey's defense with powerful straight punches and a combination of body strikes.

Round 4-6

As the fight progressed, Vargas began to apply more and more pressure. He was able to get Quartey into the corners and deliver hard blows. His speed and aggression made it difficult for Quartey to counter effectively. Quartey tried to time his jabs well and landed some powerful counterattacks, but Vargas was clearly the more dominant force in the ring in the first half of the fight. It looked like Vargas was in control, with his powerful punches testing Quartey's defenses.

Round 7-9

In the middle rounds, Vargas started to slow down due to the intensity of the fight. He had invested a lot of energy in the first six laps and was starting to show signs of fatigue. Quartey began to better control this phase of the fight. He used his experience to take back control of the ring. His jab was effective in limiting Vargas' movements, and he started hitting more accurately. Despite the intensity of Vargas' attacks, Quartey proved he was still a dangerous opponent. In some of these rounds, Quartey had more success parrying Vargas' attacks and controlling the pace of the fight.

Round 10-12

Vargas, despite some fatigue, showed his fighting spirit and fought his way back to an impressive finish to the fight. He picked up the pace again, dominating the last few laps. Quartey continued to resist with his strong defense and still tried to counter whenever he got the chance, but he didn't seem to have enough power in the last few rounds to stop Vargas or neutralize his attacks effectively. Vargas' aggression and the power of his punches determined the fight in the final rounds. He continued to increase the pressure and Quartey struggled to keep up with the young fighter's pace.

The close fight went for a full twelve rounds. Vargas came out victorious with a unanimous decision with the scores 116-111 twice and 114–113.

And this are the final punch stats:

Fernando Vargas

- Total punches landed: 389
- Total punches thrown: 909
- Percentage landed: 43%

Ike Quartey

- Total punches landed: 272
- Total punches thrown: 645
- Percentage landed: 42%

== Aftermath ==
After this fight Quartey would not fight for another five years. And Vargas would knock out Ross Thompson in round number four.

== Undercard ==
Confirmed bouts:

== Broadcasting ==
Country	Broadcaster
United States	HBO

Preceded by vs. Winky Wright	Fernando Vargas's bouts April 15, 2000	Succeeded by vs. Ross Thompson
Preceded by vs. Oscar De La Hoya	Ike Quartey's bouts April 15, 2000	Succeeded by vs. Clint McNeil
