= Oscar De La Hoya vs. Ike Quartey =

Boxing match

The Challenge
- Date: February 13, 1999
- Venue: Thomas & Mack Center, Paradise, Nevada, U.S.
- Title(s) on the line: WBC welterweight title

Tale of the tape
Boxer	Oscar De La Hoya	Ike Quartey
Nickname	The Golden Boy	The Bazooka
Hometown	East Los Angeles, California, U.S.	Accra, Ghana
Purse	$9,000,000	$4,500,000
Pre-fight record	29–0 (24 KO)	34–0–1 (29 KO)
Age	26 years	29 years, 2 months
Height	5 ft 11 in (180 cm)	5 ft 7 1/2 in (171 cm)
Weight	147 lb (67 kg)	146 1/2 lb (66 kg)
Style	Orthodox	Orthodox
Recognition	WBC; Welterweight Champion; The Ring; No. 1 Ranked Welterweight; The Ring No. 1 ranked pound-for-pound fighter 3-division world champion	The Ring; No. 3 Ranked Welterweight; Former WBA welterweight champion

Result
- De La Hoya wins via split decision (116–112, 116–113, 114–115)

Oscar De La Hoya vs. Ike Quartey, billed as The Challenge, was a professional boxing match contested on February 13, 1999, for the WBC welterweight title.

== Background ==
Reigning WBC welterweight champion Oscar De La Hoya, coming off five straight successful title defenses after capturing the title from Pernell Whitaker in April 1997, had reached an agreement in August 1998 to face former welterweight champion Ike Quartey. The undefeated Quartey was looked at as a step-up in class for De La Hoya, as he had faced criticism for matching up against aging ex-champions Julio César Chávez and Hector Camacho, and unproven fringe contenders David Kamau and Patrick Charpentier during his time as WBC welterweight champion. Prior to facing De La Hoya, Quartey had last fought in October 1997, making his seventh and final defense of his WBA welterweight title in a draw against José Luis López. Quartey had been scheduled to face Whitaker in April 1998, but the fight was postponed and eventually canceled after Whitaker tested positive for cocaine. The WBA then mandated Quartey face their new top contender Andrey Pestryayev on April 25 but this bout was also canceled when Quartey refused the financial terms. The WBA then rescheduled the Quartey–Pestryayev fight for August in Nice, France, but Quartey again pulled out of the fight claiming he had been stricken with malaria and the WBA immediately stripped him of his title afterwards.

The fight's original November 21, 1998 date was scrapped after De La Hoya suffered a cut above his left eyelid during a sparring session. After getting stitches for the injury, it was recommended De La Hoya not resume sparring for another three weeks and as a result, the fight was pushed back to February 13, 1999. This was Quartey's fourth cancellation/postponement of 1998 and all but insured that he would not fight for the entire calendar year and extend his period of inactivity to 16 months. Quartey, though angered by the postponement, decided against taking a tune-up fight as a loss would potentially jeopardize his $4,500,000 payday against De La Hoya.

== The fight ==
In what was a close fight that went the full 12 rounds, De La Hoya would ultimately be named the winner by split decision with two judge's scoring the fight in his favor with scores 116–112 and 116–113 while the third judge had Quartey the winner with a score of 115–114. In the sixth round, each fighter would score a knockdown, first De La Hoya would send Quartey down in the opening seconds of the round with a left hook, though Quartey would quickly get back up and did not appear too hurt. De La Hoya aggressively attacked Quartey after the knockdown but Quartey would counter with a left hook of his own that dropped De La Hoya on the seat of his pants though like Quartey earlier in the round, he rose quickly. Sensing the fight was close heading into the 12th round, De La Hoya sent Quartey down again with another left hook in the opening rounds. After Quartey took the standing 8-count, De La Hoya pinned him against the ropes and threw punches wildly in hopes of scoring the knockout victory, however Quartey was able to withstand De La Hoya's onslaught and escaped the round as De La Hoya tired. In the final round, De La Hoya would throw 69 punches landing 41 of them. The two fighters were almost even in landed punches with Quartey having landed 201 punches of his 608 thrown while De La Hoya landed 206 of his 551 thrown punches. However, Quartey dominated De La Hoya in power punches, landing 115 compared to just 12 for De La Hoya. HBO's unofficial ringside scorer Harold Lederman scored the fight in Quartey's favor 114–113.

== Aftermath ==
On the undercard two time welterweight title challenger Oba Carr, beat three-time super lightweight champion Frankie Randall to become the WBC's number-one ranked welterweight contender and set up welterweight title bout with De La Hoya.

== Fight card ==
Confirmed bouts:

Weight Class	Weight		vs.		Method	Round	Notes
Welterweight	147 lbs.	Oscar De La Hoya (c)	def	Ike Quartey	SD	12/12	^{Note 1}
Super Bantamweight	122 lbs.	Erik Morales	def.	Ángel Chacón	KO	2/12	^{Note 2}
Super Welterweight	154 lbs.	Oba Carr	def.	Frankie Randall	UD	10/10
Middleweight	160 lbs.	Paolo Roberto	def.	Jesús Mayorga	UD	8/8
Heavyweight	200+ lbs.	Eric Esch	def.	Patrick Graham	TKO	3/4
Super Featherweight	130 lbs.	Mia St. John	def.	Amanda Skelton	UD	4/4

^Note 1 For WBC welterweight title
^Note 2 For WBC super bantamweight title

== Broadcasting ==
Country	Broadcaster
United States	HBO
Thailand	Channel 7

Preceded by vs. Julio César Chávez II	Oscar De La Hoya's bouts 13 February 1999	Succeeded by vs. Oba Carr
Preceded by vs. José Luis López	Ike Quartey's bouts 13 February 1999	Succeeded by vs. Fernando Vargas
Awards
Preceded by Arturo Gatti vs. Ivan Robinson II; Round 3	The Ring Magazine Round of the Year; Round 6; 1999	Succeeded by Erik Morales vs. Marco Antonio Barrera; Round 5
