= Wilfredo Rivera =

Wilfredo Rivera may refer to:

- Wilfredo Rivera (boxer)
- Wilfredo Rivera (footballer)
