= Oscar De La Hoya vs. Oba Carr =

Boxing match

- Date: May 22, 1999
- Venue: Mandalay Bay Events Center, Paradise, Nevada, U.S.
- Title(s) on the line: WBC welterweight title

Tale of the tape
Boxer	Oscar De La Hoya	Oba Carr
Nickname	The Golden Boy	Motor City
Hometown	East Los Angeles, California, U.S.	Detroit, Michigan, U.S.
Purse	$5,000,000	$350,000
Pre-fight record	30–0 (24 KO)	48–2–1 (28 KO)
Age	26 years, 3 months	27 years
Height	5 ft 11 in (180 cm)	5 ft 9 1/2 in (177 cm)
Weight	147 lb (67 kg)	147 lb (67 kg)
Style	Orthodox	Orthodox
Recognition	WBC; Welterweight Champion; The Ring No. 1 ranked pound-for-pound fighter 3-division world champion	WBC; No. 1 Ranked Welterweight

Result
- De La Hoya wins via 11th-round TKO

Oscar De La Hoya vs. Oba Carr was a professional boxing match contested on May 22, 1999, for the WBC welterweight title.

== Background ==
Just over three months prior, reigning WBC welterweight champion Oscar De La Hoya had successfully defended his title against arguably his toughest opponent, undefeated former WBA welterweight champion Ike Quartey, earning a close split decision victory. On the undercard of the De La Hoya–Quartey main event, Oba Carr, twice before a welterweight title challenger, beat three-time super lightweight champion Frankie Randall to become the WBC's number-one ranked welterweight contender and set up a De La Hoya–Carr welterweight title bout. Going into the fight, the heavily favored De La Hoya somewhat overlooked Carr, as he had already signed a contract to meet then-IBF welterweight champion Félix Trinidad in what was a highly anticipated unification bout set for later in the year on September 18. Despite his status as a sizeable underdog, during the pre-fight hype, Carr made bizarre claims that he had been anointed by God to defeat De La Hoya, going as far as to predict that "a couple tons of anointing oil will come down" on him during the fight causing supernatural results.

The featured bout on the undercard saw Floyd Mayweather Jr. make the third defense of his WBC super featherweight title against Justin Juuko. Juuko was a last-minute replacement for Goyo Vargas who was forced to pull out after being diagnosed with a sinus infection and gastroenteritis.

== The fight ==
De La Hoya got off to a quick start, sending Carr down to his knees midway through the first round after landing a short left hook to Carr's head. However, De La Hoya suffered a sprained left index finger in the second after landing a jab, and the injury hindered his performance from then on, causing him to struggle against a game Carr at times during the fight. Carr hurt himself on the scorecards during the seventh round when he committed two separate fouls that cost him one point each time. The first foul was a headbutt that opened a gash under De La Hoya's left eye, while the second foul was for a low blow. In the 11th round, De La Hoya gained his second knockdown over Carr after countering a Carr jab with another left hook that landed flush against the side of Carr's head. Carr was able to get back up but was on wobbly legs. Referee Richard Steele twice motioned for Carr to come forward to him, but the dazed Carr failed to respond and Steele stopped the fight at 55 seconds into the round, giving De La Hoya the victory by technical knockout.

== Fight card ==
Confirmed bouts:

Weight Class	Weight		vs.		Method	Round	Notes
Welterweight	147 lbs.	Oscar De La Hoya (c)	def	Oba Carr	TKO	11/12	^{Note 1}
Super Featherweight	130 lbs.	Floyd Mayweather Jr.	def.	Justin Juuko	KO	9/12	^{Note 2}
Heavyweight	200+ lbs.	Maurice Harris	def.	Louis Monaco	TKO	1/8
Heavyweight	200+ lbs.	Lamon Brewster	def.	Mario Cawley	KO	2/8
Lightweight	135 lbs.	Carlos Gerena	def.	Angel Aldama	UD	8/8
Super Welterweight	154 lbs.	Tonton Semakala	def.	Jose Marcial Canas	UD	4/4

^Note 1 For WBC welterweight title
^Note 2 For WBC super featherweight title

== Broadcasting ==
Country	Broadcaster
United States	HBO

Preceded by vs. Ike Quartey	Oscar De La Hoya's bouts 22 May 1999	Succeeded by vs. Félix Trinidad
Preceded by vs. Frankie Randall	Oba Carr's bouts 22 May 1999	Succeeded by vs. Ramon Baez
