= Oscar De La Hoya vs. Miguel Ángel González =

Boxing match

For Pride and Country
- Date: January 18, 1997
- Venue: Thomas & Mack Center, Paradise, Nevada, U.S.
- Title(s) on the line: WBC super lightweight title

Tale of the tape
Boxer	Oscar De La Hoya	Miguel Ángel González
Nickname	The Golden Boy	El Mago ("The Magician")
Hometown	East Los Angeles, California, U.S.	Colonia Roma, Mexico City, Mexico
Purse	$5,000,000	$1,000,000
Pre-fight record	22–0 (20 KO)	41–0 (31 KO)
Age	23 years, 11 months	26 years, 2 months
Height	5 ft 11 in (180 cm)	5 ft 8 1/2 in (174 cm)
Weight	140 lb (64 kg)	140 lb (64 kg)
Style	Orthodox	Orthodox
Recognition	WBC; Super Lightweight champion The Ring No. 3 ranked pound-for-pound fighter 2-division world champion	WBC; No. 1 Ranked Super Lightweight; Former WBC lightweight champion

Result
- De La Hoya wins via unanimous decision (117–111, 117–100, 117–109)

Oscar De La Hoya vs. Miguel Ángel González, billed as For Pride and Country, was a professional boxing match contested on January 18, 1997 for the WBC super lightweight title.

== Background ==
In June 1996, Oscar De La Hoya had secured arguably his biggest victory at that point in his career, defeating Julio César Chávez easily by fourth-round technical knockout, capturing the WBC super lightweight title and making him a three-division world champion. Three weeks after the Chávez, it was announced that De La Hoya would make the first and, subsequently only, defense of his newly won title against undefeated former WBC lightweight Miguel Ángel González. Originally scheduled to take place on October 12, 1996, the fight was postponed when De La Hoya was diagnosed with tendinitis in his left rotator cuff. De La Hoya, who had been struggling with shoulder pain since his fight with Genaro Hernández a year prior, decided against fighting through the pain with help from a cortisone shot and entered would undergo six weeks of therapy before resuming training. The postponement lead to the cancellation of the planned January 18, 1997 rematch between De La Hoya and Julio César Chávez. Chávez had been scheduled to appear on the undercard of the De La Hoya–González fight, facing Joey Gamache in what was to be a tune-up before the planned rematch with De La Hoya. A month after the postponement, the De La Hoya–González fight was officially rescheduled to take place the following year on January 18th, the same day as when the De La Hoya–Chávez rematch had originally been scheduled.

Only a month before the fight, De La Hoya had agreed to move up in weight to challenge the reigning WBC welterweight champion Pernell Whitaker, meaning that his fight with González would be the only defense of his super lightweight title and his final fight in the division. Though González sported a perfect 41–0 record, he was looked upon as a mere afterthought as De La Hoya looked forward to his super fight with Whitaker and was installed as a heavy 6–1 underdog. However, González's new trainer, Emmanuel Steward insisted that González had a chance to win should he be able to survive the first four rounds.

== The Fight ==
For only the second time in his career to that point, De La Hoya was taken the full 12-round distance. Despite failing to score a knockdown in the fight, De La Hoya was extremely accurate offensively during the fight, landing 361 punches out of 561 thrown for an impressive 64% success rate, while González outthrew De La Hoya, he landed over 100 less punches (251 out of 751) for a 34% success rate, though he did manage to land a right hand to De La Hoya's left eye that left it badly bruised and nearly swollen shut by the end of the fight. Nevertheless, all three judges had De La Hoya comfortably ahead, with scores of 117–111, 117–110 and 117–109, giving De La Hoya the third unanimous decision victory of his career. González had two points deducted during the fight; one in the seventh round for an illegal rabbit punch and one in the 12th for hitting De La Hoya during a break.

== Fight card ==
Confirmed bouts:

Weight Class	Weight		vs.		Method	Round	Notes
Super Lightweight	140 lbs.	Oscar De La Hoya (c)	def.	Miguel Ángel González	KO	12/12	^{note 1}
Light Flyweight	108 lbs.	Mauricio Pastrana	def.	Michael Carbajal (c)	SD	12/12	^{note 2}
Super Lightweight	140 lbs.	Kostya Tszyu	vs.	Leonardo Mas	NC	1/12	^{note 3}
Super Lightweight	140 lbs.	Stevie Johnston	def.	Jose Luis Baltazar	UD	10/10
Cruiserweight	190 lbs.	Vassiliy Jirov	def.	Vincent Brown	TKO	2/6
Super Featherweight	140 lbs.	Floyd Mayweather Jr.	def.	Jerry Cooper	TKO	1/6
Heavyweight	200+ lbs.	Eric Esch	def.	Curt Allan	TKO	3/4
Welterweight	147 lbs.	Daniel Santos	def.	Reynaldo Ramirez	KO	3/4

^Note 1 For WBC Super Lightweight title
^Note 2 For IBF Light Flyweight title
^Note 3 For IBF Junior Welterweight title

== Broadcasting ==
Country	Broadcaster
Thailand	Channel 7
United States	HBO

Preceded by vs. Julio César Chávez	Oscar De La Hoya's bouts 18 January 1997	Succeeded by vs. Pernell Whitaker
Preceded by vs. Samuel Kamau	Miguel Ángel González's bouts 18 January 1997	Succeeded by vs. Roberto Granciosa
