= Marty Jakubowski =

American boxer

Personal information
- Nationality: American
- Born: August 17, 1969 (age 57) Whiting, Indiana, U.S.
- Height: 5 ft 8 1/2 in (174 cm)
- Weight: Lightweight; Light welterweight; Welterweight

Boxing career
- Stance: Orthodox

Boxing record
- Total fights: 137
- Wins: 118
- Win by KO: 34
- Losses: 7
- No contests: 12

Marty Jakubowski (born August 17, 1969) is an American former professional boxer who competed from 1987 to 2000, briefly returning in 2004 and ultimately retiring in 2005. In 137 professional bouts, he challenged three times for world titles; the WBC lightweight title in 1995; the WBO lightweight title in 1996; and the WBA super lightweight title in 1997.

== Amateur career ==
Jakubowski, an Indiana native, began his amateur career at the age of 9. After becoming a two time Chicago Golden Gloves runner-up and Chicago Park District champion, Jakubowski began his professional career at age 17 with an amateur record of 125 wins and 35 losses.

== Professional career ==
He stepped into the spotlight in 1992 with a bout against Julio César Chávez which registered his first professional loss with a sixth round technical knockout (TKO). Despite the defeat Jakubowski's popularity soared. "Since the Chavez fight, every promoter in the Midwest wanted to feature me on their card." He went on to earn 35 wins throughout the Midwest in 1993, managing to both claim and defend the Mid West lightweight title. His next major victory came in 1994 when he bested Anthony Boyle in Philadelphia and claimed the USBA lightweight title after a unanimous decision.

In 1995 he challenged Miguel Ángel González for the WBO lightweight title and in 1996 challenged Artur Grigorian for the WBC lightweight title. He lost both of these bouts in unanimous decisions although continued to rack up wins around the country between the two title fights. In 1997 he scored another loss against Khalid Rahilou in a challenge for the WBA super lightweight title. Towards the end of his career, in 1999, Jakubowski would be afforded the opportunity to again meet Julio César Chávez in the ring where he was dealt another TKO in the fourth round.

== Personal life ==
In 1988, Jakubowski made headlines after being stabbed just two years into his professional career. Jakubowski suffered a punctured and collapsed lung after reportedly being caught between two rival gangs at Whiting Park. "When I saw I was in between, I just tried to get out of the way, but someone stuck a knife in me," Jakubowski recalled. He was luckily able to return to boxing after ten days in the hospital.

In 2011 Jakubowski was inducted into the Hammond sports hall of fame.

Jakubowski still resides in Whiting with his wife and three children working as a trainer at the Knuckleheads Boxing Gym in the south loop of Chicago.
