= Miguel Ángel González (boxer) =

Mexican boxer (born 1970)

Personal information
- Nicknames: El Mago, Santa Tokyo
- Born: Miguel Ángel González Dávila; 15 November 1970 (age 55) Colonia Roma, Mexico City, Mexico
- Height: 5 ft 8 1/2 in (174 cm)
- Weight: Lightweight; Light welterweight; Welterweight; Light middleweight

Boxing career
- Reach: 68 in (173 cm)
- Stance: Orthodox

Boxing record
- Total fights: 57
- Wins: 51
- Win by KO: 40
- Losses: 5
- Draws: 1

Miguel Ángel González Dávila, also known as Excelente compañero (born 15 November 1970), is a Mexican professional boxer who held the world lightweight title.

== Amateur career ==
González grew up in a middle-class family among the suburbs of Mexico City, Mexico. At the age of 15, he began his amateur boxing career under the tutelage of legendary Mexican trainer, Pancho Rosales.

En route to an amateur record of 63–3, Gonzalez defeated future World Boxing Council (WBC) junior lightweight titleholder Gabriel Ruelas in 1988 to earn a spot on Mexico's Olympic team as a featherweight. He lost his first match to local Lee Jae-Hyuk.

== Professional career ==
González turned pro at age 18 on 21 January 1989, and scored a fifth-round technical knockout over Isidro Pacheco in Ciudad Victoria, Mexico.

After fighting for nearly two years in Mexico, González moved to Japan in the late 1980s and lived there through most of 1991. While residing there, he floored all five of his opponents and was a neighbor of future world champions Yuri Arbachakov and Orzubek Nazarov (also lightweight title holder). It was there that González got his nickname "Santa Tokyo".

On 24 August 1992, González received his first world title shot when he faced Colombian puncher Wilfrido Rocha for the World Boxing Council lightweight title in Mexico City. In a sensational fight, González had his hands full with Rocha, who put the Mexican native on the canvas in the second round. González also had his nose bloodied by his game opponent, but managed to roar back in rounds four and five. González eventually cut Rocha and forced the referee to halt matters in the ninth.

Made 10 title defenses with success (Dec. 1992 – June '95), he was dominant at the start KOing contenders Leavander Johnson and Jean-Baptiste Mendy but lost his form and struggled later. Gonzalez won a hard-fought, and somewhat controversial, majority decision over Lamar Murphy on 19 August 1995, in Las Vegas.

=== Higher weight classes ===
After the Murphy fight, González decided to vacate his title. Finding it more and more difficult to maintain the lightweight limit, González moved up one weight class with the guarantee of becoming the WBC No. 1 140-pound contender and a receiving a shot at the winner of the Julio César Chávez-Oscar De La Hoya fight.

In 1996, González, campaigning at 143 and 144 pounds, notched three non-title victories, including a fifth-round TKO over Juan Soberanes on 18 May 1996, in Las Vegas.

Exactly eight months later on 18 January 1997, González faced WBC super lightweight champion Oscar De La Hoya. De La Hoya was the naturally bigger man coming into the bout. Although González lost a 12-round unanimous decision, he counter-attacked well by utilizing his right hand (which in the end caused a bad swelling on De La Hoya's left cheek) to keep the champion away. He also did, however, get two points deducted for repeated fouls which included low blows, rabbit punches, and hitting on the break.

Gonzalez rebounded quickly from the loss to de la Hoya by stopping Bert Granciosa in the third round as part of Evander Holyfield vs. Mike Tyson II undercard on 28 June 1997.

As the then-WBC No. 2 super lightweight contender, and with the belt vacant, González received his opportunity to fight for another belt and take on his own boyhood idol, Chávez. Originally scheduled for 25 October 1997, the showdown was postponed when Chávez suffered an injury during training camp. More than five months later on 7 March 1998, the war between Mexican heroes finally took place live on pay per view from Mexico City.

As the main event in both fighters' homeland, the two former champions entered as top-ranked contenders for the WBC super lightweight belt and battled for 12 grueling rounds. González came out strong in most of the rounds and dominated the first minute or two before Chávez dug down deep to dominate the remainder of the stanzas. When the scorecards were tallied, one judge had it 116–114 for González, another saw it 115–114 for Chávez, while the final judge scored it even at 115–115.

After fighting to a draw against Chávez, González returned four months later and tallied a fifth-round TKO over Alexis Pérez on 11 July 1998, in San Antonio, Texas. Gonzalez landed a furious barrage in the fifth and forced the stoppage.

Stepping into the ring following a 14-month layoff due to repeated injury, Gonzalez took on Interim WBC Super Lightweight Champion, Kostya Tszyu, for the vacant title on Showtime 21 August 1999, in Miami.

After suffering an incidental head butt in the first round that opened a cut over his left eye, Gonzalez responded in kind in the second and attempted to hit Tszyu with low blows. His dirty tactics did not work as Tszyu thoroughly dominated his opponent. After watching his fighter withstand brutal combinations from Tszyu for much of the bout, González' trainer, Abel Sanchez, asked Referee Frank Santore to stop the bout with 48 seconds remaining in the 10th round.

After more than 15 months outside of the ring, González returned on 2 December 2000, in Las Vegas, and earned an opening-round TKO over Alex Lubo.

Three months later in his sole 2001 outing, González dropped a stunning 10-round split decision to lightly regarded Manuel Gomez in Las Vegas. Gomez, who had not fought since November 1998, outworked the former world champion en route to winning by the scores 97–92 and 95–94 for Gomez and 95 apiece.

Again González spent more than one year outside the ring before fighting 14 months later on 3 May 2002, in Ensenada, Mexico, against Roberto Urias. Three rounds into the contest, Gonzalez sent Urias to the canvas.

In his next outing 16 months later, Gonzalez floored Christian Solano three times en route to tallying a fifth-round TKO on 6 September 2003, in Mexico City. The first knockdown occurred in round two with a right hook to the head. Gonzalez then sent Solano to the canvas again in the third with another right hook, before ending matters with a right hook to the body in the fifth.

González closed out his 15th year as a pro with an opening-round TKO over Gregorio Balcazar on 18 October 2003, and a fourth-round KO against Norberto Sandoval on 28 November 2003.

González registered a 10-round unanimous decision over Ernesto Carmona on 22 May 2004, in one of the bloodiest bouts of the year.

In his last outing, González had earned the right to face undisputed welterweight champion Cory Spinks at Mandalay Bay in Las Vegas on 4 September. González took the fight to the elusive Spinks from the opening bell, throwing a lot of leather, but the slick southpaw champion proved too hard to find. Gonzalez lost by decision.

The following year, he challenged (then) WBA welterweight champion, Luis Collazo. He lost by TKO in the 8th round. Then, in 2006, he fought twice against low-ranked opponents in Mexico, winning both. He is still considered active following these last two fights, and it is not clear when González is planning to announce his retirement.

Miguel Ángel González is recognized as one of the best lightweight of the early 1990s. Due to his impressive unbeaten streak, he was once held in the same regard as Julio César Chávez and Ricardo Lopez (arguably the best and most popular Mexican boxers during the same period), but his star began to fade in the latter half of the decade as he failed to recapture his dominant form once he moved up to junior welterweight. Losses to De La Hoya and Tszyu, failure to defeat the aging Chavez, repeated injury, and lack of championship titles diminished his stature as an elite boxer. His decline also coincided with the rise of fresh Mexican stars, most notably Marco Antonio Barrera and Erik Morales.

== Professional boxing record ==
57 fights	51 wins	5 losses
By knockout	40	2
By decision	11	3
No contests	1	

No.	Result	Record	Opponent	Type	Round, time	Date	Location	Notes
57	Win	51–5–1	Ulises Duarte	TKO	10 (12)	7 Oct 2006	Museo de Transporte, Xalapa, Veracruz, Mexico	Retained WBC FECARBOX super welterweight title
56	Win	50–5–1	Alejandro Luis Garcia	UD	12	2 Sep 2006	Acapulco, Guerrero, Mexico	Won vacant WBC FECARBOX super welterweight title
55	Loss	49–5–1	Luis Collazo	RTD	7 (12), 3:00	13 Aug 2005	United Center, Chicago, Illinois, U.S.	For WBA (Regular) welterweight title
54	Loss	49–4–1	Cory Spinks	UD	12	4 Sep 2004	Mandalay Bay Resort & Casino, Paradise, Nevada, U.S.	For WBA, WBC, IBF, and The Ring welterweight titles
53	Win	49–3–1	Ernesto Carmona	TKO	10 (10), 2:03	22 May 2004	Plaza de Toros, Mexico City, Distrito Federal, Mexico	
52	Win	48–3–1	Norberto Sandoval	KO	3 (10)	27 Nov 2003	Gomez Palacio, Durango, Mexico	
51	Win	47–3–1	Gregorio Balcazar	TKO	1 (10)	18 Oct 2003	Casino Real, Mexico City, Distrito Federal, Mexico	
50	Win	46–3–1	Christian Solano	TKO	5 (10)	6 Sep 2003	Salon La Maraka, Mexico City, Distrito Federal, Mexico	
49	Win	45–3–1	Roberto Lopez	KO	3 (10)	3 May 2002	Ensenada, Baja California, Mexico	
48	Loss	44–3–1	Manuel Gomez	SD	10	3 Mar 2001	Mandalay Bay Resort & Casino, Paradise, Nevada, U.S.	
47	Win	44–2–1	Alex Lubo	TKO	1 (10), 1:30	2 Dec 2000	Mandalay Bay Resort & Casino, Paradise, Nevada, U.S.	
46	Loss	43–2–1	Kostya Tszyu	TKO	10 (12), 0:48	21 Aug 1999	Miccosukee Resort & Gaming, Miami, Florida, U.S.	For vacant WBC super lightweight title
45	Win	43–1–1	Alex Perez	TKO	5 (10), 1:45	11 Jul 1998	Alamodome, San Antonio, Texas, U.S.	
44	Draw	42–1–1	Julio César Chávez	SD	12	7 Mar 1998	Plaza de Toros México, Mexico City, Distrito Federal, Mexico	For vacant WBC super lightweight title
43	Win	42–1	Roberto Granciosa	RTD	3 (10), 3:00	28 Jun 1997	MGM Grand Garden Arena, Las Vegas, Nevada, U.S.	
42	Loss	41–1	Oscar De La Hoya	UD	12	18 Jan 1997	Thomas & Mack Center, Paradise, Nevada, U.S.	For WBC super lightweight title
41	Win	41–0	Samuel Kamau	KO	4 (10), 2:14	29 Jun 1996	Fantasy Springs Resort Casino, Indio, California, U.S.	
40	Win	40–0	Juan Soberanes	TKO	5 (10), 2:56	18 May 1996	The Mirage, Paradise, Nevada, U.S.	
39	Win	39–0	Ramon Marchena	UD	8	16 Mar 1996	MGM Grand Garden Arena, Las Vegas, Nevada, U.S.	
38	Win	38–0	Lamar Murphy	MD	12	19 Aug 1995	MGM Grand Garden Arena, Las Vegas, Nevada, U.S.	Retained WBC lightweight title
37	Win	37–0	Marty Jakubowski	UD	12	2 Jun 1995	Foxwoods Resort Casino, Ledyard, Connecticut, U.S.	Retained WBC lightweight title
36	Win	36–0	Ricardo Daniel Silva	UD	12	25 Apr 1995	Convention Center, South Padre Island, Texas, U.S.	Retained WBC lightweight title
35	Win	35–0	Calvin Grove	RTD	5 (12)	13 Dec 1994	Tingley Coliseum, Albuquerque, New Mexico, U.S.	Retained WBC lightweight title
34	Win	34–0	Leavander Johnson	TKO	8 (12), 2:05	6 Aug 1994	Plaza de Toros, Ciudad Juarez, Chihuahua, Mexico	Retained WBC lightweight title
33	Win	33–0	Kenny Baysmore	TKO	6	15 Jun 1994	Ciudad Juarez, Chihuahua, Mexico	
32	Win	32–0	Jean-Baptiste Mendy	TKO	5 (12), 2:40	29 Mar 1994	Palais des sports Marcel-Cerdan, Levallois-Perret, France	Retained WBC lightweight title
31	Win	31–0	Wilfrido Rocha	TKO	11 (12), 0:12	27 Nov 1993	Arena Coliseo, Mexico City, Distrito Federal, Mexico	Retained WBC lightweight title
30	Win	30–0	David Sample	UD	12	13 Aug 1993	Arena Coliseo, Guadalajara, Jalisco, Mexico	Retained WBC lightweight title
29	Win	29–0	Hector Lopez	UD	12	26 Apr 1993	Plaza Monumental, Aguascalientes, Aguascalientes, Mexico	Retained WBC lightweight title
28	Win	28–0	Bruno Rabanales	PTS	10	11 Mar 1993	Guadalajara, Jalisco, Mexico	
27	Win	27–0	Darryl Tyson	UD	12	5 Dec 1992	El Toreo de Cuatro Caminos, Mexico City, Distrito Federal, Mexico	Retained WBC lightweight title
26	Win	26–0	Wilfrido Rocha	TKO	9 (12)	24 Aug 1992	Fronton Mexico, Mexico City, Distrito Federal, Mexico	Won vacant WBC lightweight title
25	Win	25–0	Francisco Tomas da Cruz	KO	3	22 May 1992	Toreo de Cuatro Caminos, Mexico City, Distrito Federal, Mexico	
24	Win	24–0	Ramon Marchena	TKO	5 (12), 0:49	16 Mar 1992	Fronton Mexico, Mexico City, Distrito Federal, Mexico	Won WBC International lightweight title
23	Win	23–0	Jose Mendez	KO	8	5 Feb 1992	Mexico City, Distrito Federal, Mexico	
22	Win	22–0	Juan Soberanes	KO	6	8 Nov 1991	Arena Naucalpan, Naucalpan de Juárez, México, Mexico	
21	Win	21–0	Felipe Fuentes	KO	2	28 Sep 1991	Arena Coliseo, Mexico City, Distrito Federal, Mexico	
20	Win	20–0	William Magahin	TKO	4	19 Aug 1991	Japan	
19	Win	19–0	Ji Il-Koo	KO	5	31 Jul 1991	Hakata Star Lane, Fukuoka, Japan	
18	Win	18–0	Paquito Openo	TKO	6	21 Jun 1991	Civic Auditorium, San Jose, California, U.S.	
17	Win	17–0	Moon Tae-Jin	TKO	7 (10)	16 Mar 1991	Korakuen Hall, Tokyo, Japan	
16	Win	16–0	Lee Yung-Yong	KO	9	21 Jan 1991	Korakuen Hall, Tokyo, Japan	
15	Win	15–0	Yum Tae-Bok	TKO	5	17 Dec 1990	Korakuen Hall, Tokyo, Japan	
14	Win	14–0	Bobby Brewer	KO	3 (7), 2:56	26 Oct 1990	Lujan Building, Albuquerque, New Mexico, U.S.	
13	Win	13–0	Benny Medina	TKO	2 (10), 2:42	25 Aug 1990	Arena Coliseo, Mexico City, Distrito Federal, Mexico	
12	Win	12–0	Francisco Javier Camacho	TKO	8	2 Jun 1990	Mexico City, Distrito Federal, Mexico	
11	Win	11–0	Fernando Segura	TKO	4	28 Apr 1990	Mexico City, Distrito Federal, Mexico	
10	Win	10–0	Marco Antonio Ramirez	TKO	4	24 Mar 1990	Arena México, Mexico City, Distrito Federal, Mexico	
9	Win	9–0	Francisco Martinez Laguna	PTS	10	10 Feb 1990	Mexico City, Distrito Federal, Mexico	
8	Win	8–0	Peter Serrano	KO	2	1 Jan 1990	Mexico City, Distrito Federal, Mexico	
7	Win	7–0	Jose Ulloa	TKO	7	9 Dec 1989	Mexico City, Distrito Federal, Mexico	
6	Win	6–0	Roberto Villareal	KO	3	20 Oct 1989	Piedras Negras, Coahuila de Zaragoza, Mexico	
5	Win	5–0	Raul Hernandez	UD	8	22 Jul 1989	Mexico City, Distrito Federal, Mexico	
4	Win	4–0	Gerardo Jimenez	KO	2	5 Jul 1989	Mexico City, Distrito Federal, Mexico	
3	Win	3–0	Carmelo Bustos	KO	3	10 Apr 1989	Auditorio Municipal, Tijuana, Baja California, Mexico	
2	Win	2–0	Leonardo Lozada	KO	1	25 Feb 1989	Ciudad Victoria, Tamaulipas, Mexico	
1	Win	1–0	Serafin Pacheco	KO	5	21 Jan 1989	Ciudad Victoria, Tamaulipas, Mexico	

== Pay-per-view bouts ==
Date	Fight	Billing	Buys	Network
January 18, 1997	De La Hoya vs. Gonzalez	For Pride and Country	345,000	HBO

== See also ==
- List of world lightweight boxing champions
- List of Mexican boxing world champions

Sporting positions
World boxing titles
Vacant Title last held by Pernell Whitaker	WBC lightweight champion August 24, 1992 – 1996; Vacated	Vacant Title next held by Jean Baptiste Mendy
