= Oba Carr =

American boxer (born 1972)

Personal information
- Nickname: Motor City
- Nationality: American
- Born: Oba Diallo Carr; May 11, 1972 (age 54) Detroit, Michigan, U.S.
- Height: 5 ft 9 1/2 in (177 cm)
- Weight: Light Middleweight; Welterweight; Light Welterweight

Boxing career
- Reach: 72 in (183 cm)
- Stance: Orthodox

Boxing record
- Total fights: 61
- Wins: 54
- Win by KO: 31
- Losses: 6
- Draws: 1

Oba Diallo Carr (born May 11, 1972) is an American former professional boxer. A product of trainer Emanuel Steward's Kronk Gym in Detroit, he fought three times unsuccessfully for a welterweight world title.

== Professional career ==
Among Carr's losses are three to then reigning welterweight champions Ike Quartey, Félix Trinidad and Oscar De La Hoya (by 11th-round TKO on May 22, 1999, for the WBC Welterweight Championship).

== Personal life ==
Carr can no longer walk as a result of the blows he took to the head during his boxing career and uses a wheelchair.

== Professional boxing record ==
61 fights	54 wins	6 losses
By knockout	31	4
By decision	23	2
Draws	1	

Key to abbreviations used for results
DQ	Disqualification	RTD	Corner retirement
KO	Knockout	SD	Split decision / split draw
MD	Majority decision / majority draw	TD	Technical decision / technical draw
NC	No contest	TKO	Technical knockout
PTS	Points decision	UD	Unanimous decision / unanimous draw

Boxing record
No.	Result	Record	Opponent	Type	Round(s)	Time	Date	Location	Notes
61	Loss	54–6–1	(Uzbekistan) Kuvonchbek Toygonbaev	UD	10	N/a	18 May 2002	(United States) Mandalay Bay Events Center, Paradise, Nevada, U.S.	
60	Loss	54–5–1	(United States) Luther Smith	TKO	2 (10)	0:43	10 Feb 2002	(United States) Grand Victoria Casino, Elgin, Illinois, U.S.	
59	Win	54–4–1	(Mexico) Miguel Alejandro Jimenez	UD	10	N/a	6 Dec 2001	(United States) Palace Indian Gaming Center, Lemoore, California, U.S.	
58	Win	53–4–1	(Mexico) Norberto Sandoval	UD	10	N/a	14 Jul 2001	(United States) Pepsi Center, Denver, Colorado, U.S.	
57	Loss	52–4–1	(Colombia) Rafael Pineda	TKO	6 (10)	2:46	24 Mar 2001	(United States) MGM Grand Garden Arena, Paradise, Nevada, U.S.	
56	Win	52–3–1	(Panama) Agustin Caballero	TKO	6 (10)	0:30	15 Dec 2000	(United States) Rainbow Ballroom, Fresno, California, U.S.	
55	Win	51–3–1	(Mexico) Juan Soberanes	UD	10	N/a	15 Jun 2000	(United States) Universal Amphitheatre, Universal City, California, U.S.	
54	Win	50–3–1	(Mexico) Yori Boy Campas	RTD	8 (10)	3:00	4 Mar 2000	(United States) Mandalay Bay Events Center, Paradise, Nevada, U.S.	
53	Win	49–3–1	(Mexico) Ramon Baez	KO	4 (10)	?	15 Dec 1999	(United States) Quiet Cannon, Montebello, California, U.S.	
52	Loss	48–3–1	(United States) Oscar De La Hoya	TKO	11 (12)	0:55	22 May 1999	(United States) Mandalay Bay Events Center, Paradise, Nevada, U.S.	For WBC welterweight title
51	Win	48–2–1	(United States) Frankie Randall	UD	10	N/a	13 Feb 1999	(United States) Thomas & Mack Center, Paradise, Nevada, U.S.	
50	Win	47–2–1	(United States) Verdell Smith	UD	8	N/a	20 Nov 1998	(United States) Orleans Hotel & Casino, Las Vegas, Nevada, U.S.	
49	Win	46–2–1	(Ghana) Alfred Ankamah	UD	10	N/a	4 Aug 1998	(United States) The Palace, Auburn Hills, Michigan, U.S.	
48	Win	45–2–1	(Mexico) Juan Carlos Rodriguez	UD	10	N/a	18 Apr 1998	(United States) Olympic Auditorium, Los Angeles, California, U.S.	
47	Win	44–2–1	(Mexico) Jesus Gutierrez	KO	4 (10)	2:36	2 Feb 1998	(United States) Arrowhead Pond, Anaheim, California, U.S.	
46	Win	43–2–1	(Mexico) Jesus Rodriguez	KO	5 (10)	2:10	22 Nov 1997	(United States) Tropicana Hotel & Casino, Las Vegas, Nevada, U.S.	
45	Draw	42–2–1	(United States) Anthony Jones	SD	10	N/a	7 Oct 1997	(United States) The Palace, Auburn Hills, Michigan, U.S.	
44	Win	42–2	(Mexico) Julian Samaha	KO	5 (10)	?	5 Sep 1997	(United States) Bryce Jordan Center, University Park, Pennsylvania, U.S.	
43	Win	41–2	(United States) Ross Thompson	UD	10	N/a	24 Jun 1997	(United States) Argosy Festival Atrium, Baton Rouge, Louisiana, U.S.	
42	Win	40–2	(Mexico) Jaime Balboa	UD	10	N/a	18 May 1997	(United States) Fantasy Springs Casino, Indio, California, U.S.	
41	Loss	39–2	(Ghana) Ike Quartey	MD	12	N/a	4 Oct 1996	(United States) Madison Square Garden Theater, New York City, New York, U.S.	For WBA welterweight title
40	Win	39–1	(Mexico) Francisco Barra	RTD	5 (10)	3:00	18 May 1996	(United States) The Mirage, Las Vegas, Nevada, U.S.	
39	Win	38–1	(Mexico) Ramon Sanchez	TKO	3 (?)	N/a	16 Dec 1995	(United States) Spectrum, Philadelphia, Pennsylvania, U.S.	
