= Juan Soberanes =

Mexican boxer (born 1968)

Juan Soberanes Ramos (born June 24, 1968 in Culiacán) is a Mexican professional boxer. He's also the former WBA Fedecentro Light Welterweight Champion.

== Professional career ==
Juan won Mexican National lightweight title when he beat Juan Guardado in Tijuana.

=== IBC Lightweight title ===
In 1991, he lost his first shot at a world title against International Boxing Council (IBC) Lightweight Champion Jaime Balboa.

=== WBA Fedecentro Light Welterweight title ===
In August 1997, he won the WBA Fedecentro Light Welterweight title by upsetting title contender Jose Rodriguez.

On December 2, 1996 Ramos lost to three-time world champion, Antonio Margarito in El Gran Mercado, Phoenix, Arizona.
