= Ike Quartey =

Ghanaian boxer

Personal information
- Nickname: Bazooka
- Born: Isufu Quartey; 27 November 1969 (age 56) Accra, Ghana
- Height: 5 ft 8 in (173 cm)
- Weight: Light-welterweight; Welterweight; Light-middleweight

Boxing career
- Reach: 71 in (180 cm)
- Stance: Orthodox

Boxing record
- Total fights: 42
- Wins: 37
- Win by KO: 32
- Losses: 4
- Draws: 1

Isufu "Ike" Quartey (November 27, 1969) is a Ghanaian former professional boxer who competed from 1988 to 2006. He held the World Boxing Association (WBA) welterweight title from 1994 to 1998, and challenged once for International Boxing Federation (IBF) junior-middleweight title in 2000.

== Early years and amateur career ==
Quartey is a member of Accra's Ga tribe. He is the youngest of 27 children. His father reportedly had five wives. His older brother Isaac Quartey won a silver medal in the 1960 Olympics. He was born in Bukom where fighting was a hobby. He fought on the streets and trained in the same gym as Azumah Nelson.

Quartey had an amateur record of 50–4, and represented Ghana as a Light Welterweight at 1988 Seoul Olympic Games.

== Professional career ==
Quartey turned professional in 1988, a day short of his nineteenth birthday. He started his boxing career under the guidance of Yoofi Boham, without doubt the most successful manager in Ghana, and also father-in-law of former World boxing champion Azumah Nelson.

Boham got Quartey recognized as a boxer on the international scene. Boham managed Quartey alongside Alfred "The Cobra" Kotey and gave them the names Bazooka and Cobra. Quartey and Kotey were so close that many thought they were brothers.

Quartey began his professional career with a 2nd-round knockout of Mama Mohamed. Most of Quartey's early fights were staged in Ghana, before he relocated to France.

=== WBA welterweight champion ===
In Quartey's 26th fight he was given a shot at the WBA welterweight title, held by the then undefeated Crisanto España of Venezuela. Quartey knocked out España in the 11th round. At the time of the stoppage one judge had Quartey ahead, one had him behind and a third judge had the fight even.

He defended his title successfully seven times. Among his foes were Alberto Cortes, Vince Phillips, and Oba Carr. In October 1997 he fought José Luis López to a draw. The decision was originally read as a win for Quartey but reversed when a flaw was found in the scoring. Although Quartey was down twice, most observers felt that he deserved the victory and his reputation suffered little damage.

Personal, business and health issues kept Quartey out of the ring until February 1999. His inactivity led him to be stripped of his WBA title.

=== Quartey vs. De La Hoya ===
Quartey returned from a 14-month absence to challenge Lineal/WBC welterweight champion Oscar De La Hoya at the Thomas & Mack center in Las Vegas, Nevada on 13 February 1999. Quartey was floored in 6th and 12th rounds, with De La Hoya also down in the 6th round. De La Hoya came away with a close, albeit controversial split decision. Quartey's interest in boxing waned after this defeat.

=== Quartey vs. Vargas ===
Following the defeat to De La Hoya, Quartey would take another 14-month hiatus from the ring. He returned in April 2000 to challenge Fernando Vargas for the IBF light-middleweight championship. Quartey was defeated by a unanimous decision with scores of 116-111 twice and 114–113.

Following this fight, Quartey would not fight for another five years.

=== Return to the ring ===
Quartey returned to the ring in January 2005. He won the first three bouts of his comeback with victories over Clint McNeil, Verno Phillips and Carlos Bojorquez. On 5 August 2006, he lost a close unanimous decision to former welterweight champion Vernon Forrest at Madison Square Garden, New York by scores of 93–96, 94–95, & 94–95. CompuBox stats showed Quartey outlanding Forrest (201 out of 481, 42% for Quartey; 184 of 818, 22% for Forrest), and Forrest was docked 1 point for a low blow in the 9th round. The decision was deemed controversial by most ringsider reporters, HBO's ringside commentators (including "unofficial scorer" Harold Lederman), and much of the crowd in attendance, who responded with a semi-raucous chorus of boos and repeated chants of "Bullshit!" after the fight. On 2 December 2006, Quartey's fought former undisputed light-middleweight champion Ronald "Winky" Wright at the St. Pete Times Forum, Tampa, Florida. Quartey was down once in the fight and went on to lose a unanimous points decision.

== Boxing style ==
Quartey's best weapon was his jab, which was considered to be one of the best in boxing while he was in his prime. He primarily relied on a "peek-a-boo" or "clam-shell" defense, which consisted of him allowing punches to land on his arms, elbows and gloves which he kept held tightly to his cheeks and ribcage.

== Professional boxing record ==
42 fights	37 wins	4 losses
By knockout	32	0
By decision	5	4
Draws	1	

No.	Result	Record	Opponent	Type	Round, time	Date	Location	Notes
42	Loss	37–4–1	Winky Wright	UD	12	2 Dec 2006	St. Pete Times Forum, Tampa, Florida, US	
41	Loss	37–3–1	Vernon Forrest	UD	10	5 Aug 2006	Madison Square Garden, New York City, New York, US	
40	Win	37–2–1	Carlos Bojorquez	TKO	10 (10), 2:12	3 Dec 2005	Mandalay Bay Events Center, Paradise, Nevada, US	
39	Win	36–2–1	Verno Phillips	UD	10	18 Jun 2005	FedExForum, Memphis, Tennessee, US	
38	Win	35–2–1	Clint McNeil	TKO	8 (10)	14 Jan 2005	Azumah Nelson Sports Complex, Accra, Ghana	
37	Loss	34–2–1	Fernando Vargas	UD	12	15 Apr 2000	Mandalay Bay Events Center, Paradise, Nevada, US	For IBF junior-middleweight title
36	Loss	34–1–1	Oscar De La Hoya	SD	12	13 Feb 1999	Thomas & Mack Center, Paradise, Nevada, US	For WBC welterweight title
35	Draw	34–0–1	José Luis López	MD	12	17 Oct 1997	Foxwoods Resort Casino, Ledyard, Connecticut, US	Retained WBA welterweight title
34	Win	34–0	Ralph Jones	KO	5 (12), 1:08	18 Apr 1997	Las Vegas Hilton, Winchester, Nevada, US	Retained WBA welterweight title
33	Win	33–0	Oba Carr	MD	12	4 Oct 1996	Paramount Theater, New York City, New York, US	Retained WBA welterweight title
32	Win	32–0	Vince Phillips	TKO	3 (12), 2:31	12 Apr 1996	Atlantis Casino, Sint Maarten, Netherlands Antilles	Retained WBA welterweight title
31	Win	31–0	Jorge Ramirez	TKO	4	3 Feb 1996	Palais des Sports Marcel-Cerdan, Levallois-Perret, France	
30	Win	30–0	Andrew Murray	TKO	4 (12), 0:44	23 Aug 1995	La Palestre, Le Cannet, France	Retained WBA welterweight title
29	Win	29–0	Jung-Oh Park	TKO	4 (12), 2:55	4 Mar 1995	Convention Hall, Atlantic City, New Jersey, US	Retained WBA welterweight title
28	Win	28–0	Bobby Butters	TKO	3 (8)	4 Feb 1995	Palais des Sports, Castelnau-de-Guers, France	
27	Win	27–0	Alberto de las Mercedes Cortes	TKO	5 (12), 2:03	1 Oct 1994	Arena de Cosets, Carpentras, France	Retained WBA welterweight title
26	Win	26–0	Crisanto España	TKO	11 (12)	4 Jun 1994	Palais des Sports Marcel-Cerdan, Levallois-Perret, France	Won WBA welterweight title
25	Win	25–0	Lonnie Smith	PTS	10	16 Oct 1993	Palais des Sports Marcel-Cerdan, Levallois-Perret, France	
24	Win	24–0	Moises Rivera	PTS	10	24 Jun 1993	Vélodrome, Bordeaux, France	
23	Win	23–0	Mario Morales	UD	8	6 Mar 1993	Palais des Sports Marcel-Cerdan, Levallois-Perret, France	
22	Win	22–0	Floyd Williams	KO	4 (8)	6 Feb 1993	Cirque d'Hiver, Paris, France	
21	Win	21–0	Martin Quiroz	KO	4	20 Jan 1993	Avoriaz, Morzine, France	
20	Win	20–0	Jose Lugo	KO	1	5 Dec 1992	Palais des Sports, Berck, France	
19	Win	19–0	Steve Barreras	TKO	3 (6), 2:50	21 Oct 1992	Riviera, Winchester, Nevada, US	
18	Win	18–0	Alfredo Horacio Jaurena	TKO	1 (12)	25 Jun 1992	Acquaflash, Licola, Italy	Retained WBC International light-welterweight title
17	Win	17–0	Juan Carlos Ceferino Villarreal	TKO	5 (12)	15 Apr 1992	San Pellegrino, Italy	Retained WBC International light-welterweight title
16	Win	16–0	Dindo Canoy	TKO	1 (12)	7 Mar 1992	Accra, Ghana	Won vacant WBC International light-welterweight title
15	Win	15–0	Kelcie Banks	TKO	7 (10), 2:05	2 Nov 1991	Fiscalini Field, San Bernardino, California, US	
14	Win	14–0	Alafia Apovo	KO	4	10 Aug 1991	Accra, Ghana	
13	Win	13–0	Sammy Clay	KO	2 (12)	4 May 1991	Accra, Ghana	Retained African light-welterweight title
12	Win	12–0	Humberto Rodriguez	KO	1	16 Mar 1991	Pabellón Príncipe Felipe, Zaragoza, Spain	
11	Win	11–0	Mohammed Muritala	KO	1 (12)	15 Dec 1990	Accra, Ghana	Won vacant African light-welterweight title
10	Win	10–0	Jean Claude N'Kodo	KO	1	28 Apr 1990	Accra, Ghana	
9	Win	9–0	Tubor Briggs	TKO	1 (12)	2 Dec 1989	Accra, Ghana	Retained West African light-welterweight title
8	Win	8–0	Arc-Wash Johnson	KO	2 (12)	21 Oct 1989	Accra, Ghana	Won vacant Ghanaian light-welterweight title
7	Win	7–0	Adenko Deka	KO	1 (10)	9 Sep 1989	Accra, Ghana	
6	Win	6–0	Simon Peter McIntosh	TKO	4 (10)	17 Jul 1989	Accra, Ghana	
5	Win	5–0	Anor Amissah	TKO	8 (10)	10 Jun 1989	Accra, Ghana	
4	Win	4–0	Aaron Duribe	TKO	5 (8)	29 Apr 1989	Accra, Ghana	
3	Win	3–0	Jaffa Ballogou	KO	2 (12)	22 Apr 1989	Accra, Ghana	Won vacant West African light-welterweight title
2	Win	2–0	Steven Gabienu	KO	1 (6)	26 Dec 1988	Accra, Ghana	
1	Win	1–0	Mama Mohamed	KO	2 (6)	26 Nov 1988	Accra, Ghana	

== Pay-per-view bouts ==
Date	Fight	Billing	Buys	Network
February 13, 1999	De La Hoya vs. Quartey	The Challenge	570,000	HBO

Sporting positions
Regional boxing titles
Inaugural champion	West African light-welterweight champion 22 April 1989 – December 1990; Vacated	Vacant Title next held by Stephen Okine
Inaugural champion	Ghanaian light-welterweight champion 21 October 1989 – December 1990; Vacated	Vacant Title next held by Kofi Jantuah
Vacant Title last held by Valery Kayumba	ABU light-welterweight champion 15 December 1990 – March 1992; Vacated	Vacant Title next held by Habib Mahjoub
Vacant Title last held by Guillermo Mosquera	WBC International light-welterweight champion 7 March 1992 – February 1993; Vacated	Vacant Title next held by Jan Piet Bergman
World boxing titles
Preceded by Crisanto España	WBA welterweight champion 4 June 1994 – 19 August 1998; Stripped	Vacant Title next held by James Page
