= Patrick Charpentier =

French boxer

Personal information
- Nationality: French
- Born: Patrick Charpentier; 18 June 1970 (age 56) France
- Height: 5 ft 8 in (1.73 m)
- Weight: Welterweight

Boxing career
- Stance: Orthodox

Boxing record
- Total fights: 33
- Wins: 27
- Win by KO: 23
- Losses: 5
- Draws: 1
- No contests: 0

Patrick Charpentier (born 18 June 1970) is a French boxer who had a boxing record of 27 wins, five losses, and one draw. He had 23 knockouts.

Charpentier began boxing in 1989 and held two titles: the French welterweight title and the European Boxing Union welterweight title.

His biggest fight of his career came against Oscar De La Hoya for the World Boxing Council welterweight title on 13 June 1998. De la Hoya defeated him by third-round knockout in Charpentier's final fight.
