= Wilfredo Rivera (boxer) =

Puerto Rican boxer (b. 1969)

Personal information
- Nationality: Puerto Rican
- Born: May 4, 1969 San Juan, Puerto Rico
- Height: 5 ft 11 in (180 cm)
- Weight: Welterweight

Boxing career
- Reach: 72 in (183 cm)
- Stance: Orthodox

Boxing record
- Total fights: 43
- Wins: 35
- Win by KO: 21
- Losses: 7
- Draws: 1

Wilfredo Rivera (born May 4, 1969) is a Puerto Rican former professional boxer who fought three times for world titles, losing to Pernell Whitaker twice and to Oscar De La Hoya.

== Early life ==
Rivera grew in poverty in Rio Piedras, San Juan, Puerto Rico, the son of Wilfredo Rivera, Sr. and of Iris Violeta. When he was 12, his parents divorced and his father moved to Brooklyn, New York, in the United States.

Rivera faced a difficult childhood. he told Ring Magazine in 2024 that he and his siblings faced problems as children, particularly hunger, his mother's condition of schizophrenia and his father's semi-indifference. When he was young, he was separated from his brother and sister, as the government put them in different houses as his mom was hospitalized to treat her condition

Once she was released from the hospital, she sought to reunite her children and he was reunited with his brother and sister. He had suffered corporal punishment at the house he was placed at; being given lashes in order to make him behave. He discovered boxing at the age of 8 when he was playing one day and heard some noises, which made him curious, so he went into a building and saw boxers practicing and exercising; he thought what they were doing looked like it was fun and soon joined the gym, managed by a trainer named Don Eusebio. Soon, he began winning amateur fights, demonstrating talent for the sport of boxing.

== Amateur career ==
Rivera was a member of the Puerto Rican men's boxing team that participated at the 1988 Summer Olympics in Seoul, South Korea. He was, however, not allowed to participate himself, the Puerto Rican Boxing Federation choosing Hector Arroyo instead to fight at Rivera's weight during those Olympic Games. Rivera wound up his amateur boxing career with a record of 51 wins and 6 losses.

== Professional career ==
Rivera debuted as a professional boxer on May 2, 1988, beating the also debuting Jose Centeno by knockout in San Juan. He then defeated Agustin Silva and Luis Rivera (no relation), the latter as part of an undercard headed by the fight between John John Molina and Juan Laporte at the Roberto Clemente Coliseum in San Juan on April 29, 1989.

Rivera won his next two bouts, both at the Madison Square Garden's Felt Forum, before facing future IBF world Lightweight champion Leavander Johnson, 3-0 before their bout, on September 12, 1989, in a battle of undefeated prospects at the Showboat Hotel in Atlantic City, New Jersey. The two remained undefeated after fighting to a draw (tie).

After two wins over lower opposition rivals Luis De Jesus (3-7) and Jose Luis De Jesus (1-1, the latter two not the same boxer), Rivera fought a string of hard opponents, including 11-1 Francisco Martinez, a knockout victory for Rivera on June 21, 1991, at Tamiami, Florida; Valentin Ocasio, who was 2-5 but who had lasted the six rounds distance against Félix Trinidad earlier and whom Rivera knocked out on October 30, 1991, in San Juan; 27-12 Idelmar Paisan, a unanimous decision win for Rivera on November 27 at San Juan; fellow Trinidad victim, 17-15 Darren McGrew, knocked out by Rivera on March 12, 1992, in San Juan; and 21-12-3 Amancio Castro, defeated by Rivera on June 13, 1992, at Miami by technical knockout.

Next was Delfino Martin, a 13 win, 17 losses trail horse who fought Rivera on Saturday, February 13, 1993, as part of the undercard in which Molina successfully defended his IBF world Junior Lightweight title by outpointing Francisco Segura over 12 rounds at the Roberto Clemente Coliseum in San Juan. Rivera defeated Martin by unanimous decision.

Rivera then entered a Great Western Forum annual competition that was held for many years in Inglewood, California in which winners in each boxing division were promised a world ranking among the top ten in their category by one of the four major sanctioning bodies and, possibly, a world title shot, Rivera competing in the 1993 edition of the tournament's Welterweight championship. On April 26, 1993, Rivera won in the tournament's quarterfinals by knocking out Argentina's Ariel Chaves to advance to the semifinals, held on June 28, when he faced former WBC Junior Welterweight world champion Lonnie Smith, an American whom Rivera outpointed in order to reach the tournament's Welterweight division's final, fought against Stephan Johnson on August 9. He beat Johnson by 10 round unanimous decision to become the Great Western Forum's boxing tournament's 1993 edition's Welterweight champion.

After gaining a ranking among the WBC's top ten Welterweights, Rivera proceeded to beat 9-3 Carlos Cartagena by knockout on July 22, 1994, in Trujillo Alto, 56-24-5 former world title challenger Rod Sequenan by knockout on September 12, 1994, at the Great Western Forum, 16-5-2 Ronald Rangel by unanimous decision at the Taj Majal Hotel and Casino in Atlantic City on January 25, 1995, an April 18 victory over fringe contender, Cassius Clay Horne, 29-8-2 before their bout at the Aladdin Hotel and Casino in Las Vegas-a knockout victory-, a win over veteran trial horse Manuel Hernandez, 18-15-2, on a technical knockout July 15 at the Caesar's Tahoe in Stateline and one over 22-16 Steve Larrimore on November 18 at the Taj Majal Hotel and Casino.

By this point of his career, Rivera's record was 23-0-1 with 14 knockout wins; he was a highly regarded contender for the WBC world Welterweight title held by Pernell Whitaker, and the local press in Puerto Rico widely speculated about the outcome of a bout between the two.

=== Fights with Pernell Whitaker for world title ===
Rivera's first world championship fight was held on April 12, 1996, at the Atlantis Casino, Cupecoy Bay, in the island of St. Maarten, in front of an exclusive crowd of 1,000 casino guests. The fight was televised to Puerto Rico and the United States on HBO Boxing. Commentators Jim Lampley, Larry Merchant and George Foreman did not expect a Rivera victory. After twelve rounds, however, Rivera had impressed the HBO team enough to have HBO's unofficial judge, Harold Lederman, score the bout for Rivera, 115–113. Whitaker, however, was given a very controversial 12 round split decision win, with judges Tamotsu Tomihara (116-111) and George St. Aude (115-113) scoring for the champion and judge Barbara Perez scoring for Rivera, 115–112.

Due to the closeness of their first fight, and to the protests raised by boxing magazines both in Latin America and the United States (Rivera was even called the "uncrowned champion" on some outlets), the World Boxing Council ordered an immediate rematch. The second Rivera-Whitaker bout was fought at the James Knight Convention Center in Miami, Florida. At stake was not only the WBC world Welterweight title but also a big money fight versus WBC world Junior Welterweight champion Oscar de La Hoya, who was planning to challenge the rematch's winner. Rivera dropped the champion in round five with a body blow that landed after Whitaker apparently tripped on Rivera's left foot. Whitaker then responded by dropping Rivera with a left to the chin in round six. Rivera also lost a point during that round for a low blow.

Once again, Whitaker pulled a very close and somewhat controversial, but this time unanimous, decision win over 12 rounds to retain the WBC world welterweight title, with scores of 115-113 by Masakazu Ushida, 113-112 by Jay Kassees, and 115-111 by John Keene. Had Rivera not lost a point and been dropped in round six, this bout would have ended in a draw (tie) and possibly a third match between Rivera and Whitaker (by losing points due to the low blow and the fall, Rivera lost the chance of having the bout scored 114-113 for him by Kassees and 115-115 by Ushida, which, added to Keene's score-which would have read 115-113 for Whitaker-would have caused the bout to be ruled a tie). HBO's unofficial judge, Harold Lederman, also notably, this time scored the bout for Whitaker by a score of 116–109.

The next year, Whitaker lost his world title to De La Hoya by way of yet another very controversial but unanimous decision.

=== Further career ===
On March 22, 1997, Rivera was matched with the legendary but shopworn former WBA world Lightweight champion Livingstone Bramble at El Condado, San Juan. Rivera dominated this bout, scoring a third-round knockout win over his experienced foe, who had beaten International Boxing Hall of Fame member Ray Mancini twice and who sported a 38-19-2 record into this fight.

On April 19, 1997, Rivera faced Alex Lubo, a 10-1 contender who hoped to upset Rivera and enter the Welterweight top 10 rankings himself. Rivera halted Lubo, winning by technical knockout to continue having a spot among the WBC's top ten Welterweight championship contenders, and followed that win with a knockout victory against 24-15 -2 journeyman Benjie Marquez on July 25, also at San Juan. On September 12, Rivera faced Mark Hammon, a veteran journeyman with a record of 38 wins and 12 losses. If Rivera could get past Hammon, a fight with WBC world Welterweight champion Oscar De La Hoya would be signed. With such an opportunity lurking on the horizon, Rivera made his Caesars Palace hotel debut in Las Vegas, dispatching Hammon by knockout.

=== Challenge of Oscar De la Hoya ===
Rivera next signed to face the WBC world Welterweight champion, Oscar De la Hoya, in what constituted Rivera's third world title try. A massive promotional tour followed in which Rivera and De La Hoya got acquainted; they generally got along well during their tour, which included a stop in New York City where the two friends decided to leave their press conferences' premises and join a passing carriage, from where they took a sightseeing tour of the city. This moment was recorded by ESPN camera crews and shown on their Sportscenter highlights.

Their bout was held on December 6, 1997, at the Caesars Hotel and Casino in Atlantic City, New Jersey and broadcast live on HBO Pay Per View. Once again, little chance was given to Rivera by the boxing press and fans alike; he did, however, trade blows evenly with De La Hoya for a good portion of the bout, falling in round four but getting up and battling it out until round eight, when the bout was stopped due to a cut (which had been caused by a De La Hoya punch) bleeding too profusely for Rivera to continue, therefore Rivera lost the fight by an eighth-round technical knockout. De La Hoya was winning the bout by a substantial number of points on the judges' scorecards when the fight was stopped.

Following the fight with De La Hoya, Rivera crossed gloves with come-backing future International Boxing Hall of Fame member, former WBC world Welterweight champion, 31-3-3, 19 knockout wins rival Carlos Palomino, by then a Hollywood actor who had recently been a boxing commissioner for the California State Athletic Commission and who was undefeated in four bouts, including a first-round knockout over former world champion Rene Arredondo, during his late 1990s boxing comeback. Rivera-Palomino was held at the historic Olympic Auditorium at Los Angeles, California, and Rivera convinced the Mexican legend to re-retire, beating him by ten round unanimous decision.

On April 21, 1999, Rivera faced future North American Boxing Federation Junior Middleweight (Super Welterweight) champion, Mexican prospect, 13-0 Angel Hernandez at Rosemont, Illinois, beating Hernandez on points. On July 16, 1999, Rivera fought a mismatch against 14-34-1 triailhorse Jimmy Morgan, who was stopped by the Puerto Rican at the Radisson Hotel, in Evansville, Indiana.

Then Rivera faced Shane Mosley, the former IBF world lightweight champion who had moved to the Welterweight division. A world title chance was at stake when Mosley and Rivera matched punches at the Pechanga Entertainment Center in Temecula, California on September 25, 1999 (Oscar De La Hoya had lost his title to another Puerto Rican, Félix Trinidad at their bout one week before). Mosley-Rivera was also televised by HBO Boxing. In a bruising affair, Rivera won three of the first nine rounds on HBO's unofficial judge Harold Lederman's card before being overcome by Mosley in round 10 by knockout.

Mosley went on to conquer the WBC world Welterweight title in the summer of 2000 by outpointing De La Hoya, who had beaten Derrell Coley and had the WBC reinstate him as world welterweight champion after Trinidad, Jr. vacated it to move on to the Junior Middleweight division.

=== Fight against Fernando Vargas ===
Rivera took off some time after the action-packed loss at the hands of Mosley, returning ten months after with a win on July 21, 2000, against 16-15 Gerald Coleman by technical knockout at the Harrah's hotel and Casino in Reno, Nevada, a victory that he followed with one over the veteran Rob Bleakley, who, with a record of 77 wins, 29 losses and one draw was making his 108th bout against Rivera when they met on January 7, 2001, at Nashville, Tennessee. Rivera outpointed Bleakley over ten rounds, setting up a ten-round bout against former IBF world Junior Middleweight champion "Ferocious Fernando Vargas".

The Rivera-Vargas bout took place on May 5, 2001, at the Don Haskins Convention Center in El Paso, Texas. Rivera almost caused an upset when he dropped the heavily favored Vargas in round two of their bout, but Vargas rose from the canvas to win by sixth-round knockout in a fight broadcast on HBO Boxing After Dark.

=== Last fights ===
Rivera had five bouts after the Vargas loss, going 3–2 with one knockout win in those five bouts, which included a technical knockout loss to 20-4 Alfredo Cuevas on July 19, 2002, for the vacant United States Boxing Organization's Junior Middleweight title in a bout held at Chicago, Illinois.

Rivera retired a winner after defeating Darien Ford (10-11 coming in) by unanimous decision at Allentown, Pennsylvania on July 10, 2005.

He had a record of 35 wins, 7 losses and 1 draw, with 21 wins by way of knockout.

== Pay-per-view bouts ==
Date	Fight	Billing	Buys	Network
December 6, 1997	De La Hoya vs. Rivera	Tital Wave	240,000	HBO

== After boxing ==
Rivera worked as a security guard for some time once his boxing career was over. He faced a divorce from his wife and was fired from the job as a security guard, ending up homeless for some time. He lived in his van, a blue Chevrolet Astro, in Carolina, Puerto Rico. He was born with a stuttering condition, which led to many prospective employers thinking he is punch drunk,

== Personal life ==
He has a daughter named Ashley and a son named Jeremy.
