= Boxing in the 2000s =

Boxing in the 2000s includes notable events about boxing which occurred between 2000 and 2009.

== Lists of notable fights and other key news by year ==
=== 2000 ===
==== February ====
- February 19 - Erik Morales defeats Marco Antonio Barrera to unify the WBO and WBC super bantamweight belts. Was named fight of the year by Ring Magazine

==== March ====
- March 3 - Félix Trinidad defeats David Reid by unanimous decision for the WBA light middleweight title.

==== April ====
- April 1 - Chris Byrd wins the WBO Heavyweight title from Vitali Klitschko.
- April 8 - Uriah Grant knocked out Thomas Hearns in the third round to win the IBO Cruiserweight championship.
- April 15 - Fernando Vargas successfully defends the IBF light middleweight title against former WBA welterweight champion Ike Quartey
- April 29 - Lennox Lewis defends the IBF and WBC Heavyweight titles via 2nd-round KO against Michael Grant

==== June ====
- June 17 - Shane Mosley defeats Oscar De La Hoya by split decision for the WBC welterweight title.

==== July ====
- July 15 - Lennox Lewis defeat Francois Botha via 2nd-round KO to retain his WBC, IBF, IBO, Lineal Heavyweight Championship

==== August ====
- August 12 - Evander Holyfield defeats John Ruiz by unanimous decision for the vacant WBA Heavyweight title making Holyfield the only heavyweight in boxing history to win a portion of the HW title 4 times.

==== September ====
- September 2 - Erik Morales defeats Kevin Kelley by 7th-round KO to win the Interim WBC Featherweight Championship
- September 2 - Diego Corrales defeats Angel Manfredy by 3rd-round TKO to retained his IBF & IBA Super Featherweight Championship
- September 9 - Roy Jones Jr. defeats Eric Harding by 10th-round TKO to retained his WBC, WBA, IBF, and won the IBO Light Heavyweight Championship

==== November ====
- November 11 - Lennox Lewis defends the WBC and IBF Heavyweight titles in a lopsided unanimous decision against David Tua.

==== December ====
- December 1 - Bernard Hopkins defeats Antwun Echols by 10th-round TKO to retained his IBF Middleweight Championship
- December 2 - Félix Trinidad defeats Fernando Vargas by 12th-round KO to unify the WBA and IBF light middleweight titles. Trinidad was knocked down early in the fourth round to come back and defeat Vargas.

=== 2001 ===
==== January ====
- January 20 - Floyd Mayweather Jr. dominates Diego Corrales to successfully defend his WBC Super Featherweight title. Corrales was knocked down five times, before his corner threw the towel in the tenth round.

==== March ====
- March 3 - John Ruiz defeats Evander Holyfield by unanimous decision to win the WBA Heavyweight championship. Ruiz, an American of Puerto Rican descent, becomes the first Hispanic world heavyweight champion.
- March 24 - Oscar De La Hoya wins decisively against Arturo Gatti by knockout in five rounds in a non-title match.

==== April ====
- April 7 - After a fourteen-minute introduction, Naseem Hamed loses to Marco Antonio Barrera by unanimous decision. Barrera, then known as a brawler, surprisingly easily out-boxed Hamed, who later retired after his next bout.
- April 22 - Hasim Rahman defeats Lennox Lewis via 5th-round KO in South Africa and wins the WBC and IBF heavyweight titles. Rahman lands a hard right hand for the upset knockout.

==== May ====
- May 12 - Félix Trinidad beats William Joppy, by knockout in 5, to take the WBA middleweight title.

==== June ====
- June 23 - Oscar De La Hoya captures the WBC Light Middleweight title by unanimous decision against Javier Castillejo.
- July 13 - Micky Ward defeats Emanuel Augustus by 10-round decision and is named fight of the year by Ring Magazine
- July 28 - Roy Jones Jr. defends the WBC, WBA, and IBF light heavyweight titles against Julio César González by unanimous decision.

==== September ====
- September 29 - In a career defining performance, Bernard Hopkins defeats Félix Trinidad by technical knockout in 12, to successfully unify the WBA, WBC, and IBF titles to become the Undisputed Middleweight Champion.

==== November ====
- November 3 - Kostya Tszyu becomes the undisputed champion of the Light Welterweight division as he defeats Zab Judah by a dramatic second-round knockout in Las Vegas, Nevada. Judah was later suspended for 6 months and fined by the Nevada State Athletic Commission for attacking referee Jay Nady and hurling his stool toward the center of the ring after the fight was stopped.
- November 17 - Lennox Lewis recaptures the WBC and IBF Heavyweight title as he avenges his loss against Hasim Rahman by fourth-round knockout.

==== December ====
- December 15 - John Ruiz and Evander Holyfield fought to a draw for the WBA Heavyweight Championship

=== 2002 ===
==== January ====
- January 26 - Vernon Forrest upsets Shane Mosley by unanimous decision, to capture the WBC Welterweight title.

==== February ====
- February 2 - In his first fight after becoming Undisputed Middleweight Champion, Bernard Hopkins defends the WBA, WBC, and IBF titles against Carl Daniels.

==== March ====
- March 30 - In a rematch, Ricardo Mayorga defeats Andrew "six heads" Lewis by 5th-round TKO to capture the WBA welterweight title.

==== April ====
- April 20 - Floyd Mayweather Jr. moves to lightweight and wins by controversial unanimous decision against José Luis Castillo to take the WBC Lightweight title.

==== May ====
- May 18 - Micky Ward defeats Arturo Gatti in a very competitive non-title light welterweight bout. After getting knocked down in the ninth round Gatti came back and traded power punches with Ward. The fight was later named the 2002 Ring Magazine fight of the year.

==== June ====
- June 1 - Evander Holyfield defeats Hasim Rahman by technical decision in eight rounds. A welt the size of a golf ball formed on Rahman's head leading the referee to stop the fight.
- June 8 - Lennox Lewis defeats Mike Tyson by eighth-round knockout. The fight is overshadowed by its prefight melee, in which Tyson rushed Lewis and started a brawl.
- June 22 - In their rematch, Marco Antonio Barrera defeats Erik Morales by unanimous decision to take the WBC featherweight title.

==== July ====
- July 20 - Vernon Forrest defeats Shane Mosley in their rematch by unanimous decision, in Indianapolis to defend the WBC Welterweight title.

==== September ====
- September 14 - Oscar De La Hoya defeats Fernando Vargas by 11th-round TKO to unify the WBC and WBA light middleweight belts.

==== November ====
- November 23 - Arturo Gatti defeats Mickey Ward by unanimous decision in their second fight

==== December ====
- December 7 - Floyd Mayweather Jr. defends his WBC lightweight title as he defeats José Luis Castillo in their rematch.

=== 2003 ===
==== January ====
- January 25 - Ricardo Mayorga knocks out Vernon Forrest by 3rd-round knockout, to unify the WBC and WBA Welterweight titles.

==== March ====
- March 1 - Roy Jones Jr. defeats John Ruiz by unanimous decision to win the WBA Heavyweight Championship.

April

- April 26 - James Toney defeats Vassiliy Jirov by unanimous decision to win the IBF Cruiserweight Championship.

==== June ====
- June 21 - Lennox Lewis defends his title as he defeats Vitali Klitschko by technical knockout in 6 due to a cut in Klitschko's left eye. Klitschko was up on all of the scorecards at the time of the stoppage. There is talk of a rematch, but Lewis instead retires.

==== July ====
- July 12 - Ricardo Mayorga successfully defends his WBA and WBC welterweight belts as he defeats Vernon Forrest by controversial majority decision.
- July 17 - Jeff Lacy (as an up-and-coming super middleweight) defeats Richard Grant to win the vacant NABA Super Middleweight title as well as the USBA and WBC Continental Americas Super Middleweight titles.

==== September ====
- September 13 - Shane Mosley defeats Oscar De La Hoya in their rematch to unify the WBC and WBA light middleweight title belts.

==== November ====
- November 8 - Roy Jones Jr. defeats Antonio Tarver by controversial majority decision to recapture the light heavyweight title.
- November 15 - Manny Pacquiao upsets Marco Antonio Barrera by eleventh-round technical knockout to earn the Lineal and Ring Magazine featherweight title.

==== December ====
- December 13 - Cory Spinks becomes the Undisputed Welterweight Champion after he defeats Ricardo Mayorga by majority decision.

=== 2004 ===
==== January ====
- January 17 - Zsolt Erdei defeats Julio César González to become the WBO Light Heavyweight titleholder

==== March ====
- March 13 - Winky Wright becomes the Undisputed Light Middleweight Champion after defeating Shane Mosley by unanimous decision.

==== April ====
- April 10 - Cory Spinks defends his undisputed welterweight title as he defeats Zab Judah by unanimous decision.

==== May ====
- May 8 - Manny Pacquiao and Juan Manuel Márquez fought for the Featherweight championship. Although he was knocked down 3 times in the 1st round, Márquez managed to control the succeeding rounds to earn a somewhat controversial draw. Márquez retained his WBA and IBF titles, while Pacquiao retained his Ring Magazine title.
- May 15 - Antonio Tarver upsets Roy Jones Jr., knocking him out in the second round to take the WBC, WBA and WBO light heavyweight titles.

==== September ====
- September 18 - Bernard Hopkins adds the WBO title to his undisputed middleweight status as he defeats Oscar De La Hoya by a bodyshot knockout in the ninth round. This is Oscar De La Hoya's only defeat by knockout, and the last knockout victory Hopkins achieved (All of Hopkins' victories after this will be by decision).
- September 25 - Roy Jones Jr. gets knocked out for the second consecutive fight as he loses to Glen Johnson for the IBF light heavyweight title.

==== November ====
- November 20 - Winky Wright beats Shane Mosley in their rematch to defend the light middleweight title.

==== December ====
- December 18 - Glen Johnson beats Antonio Tarver by split decision.

=== 2005 ===
==== February ====
- February 5 - Zab Judah knocks out Cory Spinks in nine rounds in Spinks's hometown, St. Louis, Missouri. Judah becomes the new Undisputed Welterweight Champion. Spinks had a dramatic ring entrance with rapper Nelly.

==== March ====
- March 19 - Erik Morales defeats Manny Pacquiao by unanimous decision.

==== May ====
- May 7 - Diego Corrales defeats José Luis Castillo by 10th-round knockout for the WBO-WBC lightweight title unification. Both men were exchanging brutal punishment throughout the fight, before a dramatic tenth round in which Corrales scored a TKO after getting knocked down twice. It won Fight of the Year.
- May 14 - Winky Wright beats Félix Trinidad by unanimous decision.

==== June ====
- June 4 - Ricky Hatton defeats The Ring champion and universally acknowledged #1 Light-Welterweight Kostya Tszyu by 11th-round TKO for the IBF Light-Welterweight title. After a highly physical battle, Tszyu was unable to come out for the twelfth round.
- June 18 - Antonio Tarver defeats Glen Johnson by unanimous decision in their rematch.
- June 25 - Floyd Mayweather Jr. comprehensively defeats Arturo Gatti by six-round technical knockout to capture the WBC Light Welterweight title.

==== July ====
- July 16 - Bernard Hopkins loses a split decision against Jermain Taylor, who becomes the new Undisputed Middleweight Champion.

==== September ====
- September 3 - Markus Beyer defeats Omar Sheika by unanimous decision, to retain the WBC super middleweight title.
- September 9 - Clinton Woods defeats Julio César González by unanimous decision, to retain the IBF light heavyweight title.
- September 10 - Zahir Raheem upsets Erik Morales by unanimous decision
  - Manny Pacquiao defeats Héctor Velázquez by 6th round TKO
- September 17 - Marco Antonio Barrera defeats Robbie Peden by unanimous decision to unify the WBC & IBF super featherweight titles
  - Jesús Chávez defeats Leavander Johnson by 11th round TKO to win the IBF lightweight title
  - Shane Mosley defeats Jose Luis Cruz by unanimous decision
- September 24 - Wladimir Klitschko defeats Samuel Peter by unanimous decision in a IBF heavyweight title eliminator
  - Miguel Cotto defeats Ricardo Torres by 7th round KO, to retain the WBO light welterweight title
- September 28 - Lamon Brewster defeats Luan Krasniqi by ninth-round stoppage, to retain the WBO heavyweight title

==== October ====
- October 1 - Antonio Tarver again beats Roy Jones Jr., this time by unanimous decision.
- October 1 - Chris Byrd defeats DaVarryl Williamson by unanimous decision, to retain the IBF heavyweight title
  - James Toney defeats Dominick Guinn by unanimous decision.
- October 8 - José Luis Castillo defeats Diego Corrales in their rematch
- October 15 - Tomasz Adamek defeats Thomas Ulrich by 6th round KO to retain the WBC light heavyweight) title
- October 22 - Zsolt Erdei defeats Mehdi Sahnoune by 12th round TKO to retain the Lineal and WBO light heavyweight titles.

==== November ====
- November 5 - Jeff Lacy defeats Scott Pemberton by 2nd round KO to retain the IBF super middleweight title
  - Rafael Márquez defeats Silence Mabuza by 4th round TKO, to retain the IBF bantamweight title
- November 9 - WBC and The Ring heavyweight champion Vitali Klitschko announced his retirement from boxing after snapping his anterior cruciate ligament 9 days before a bout with "Interim" champion Hasim Rahman. Rahman was promoted to the full WBC champion.
- November 19 - Floyd Mayweather Jr. defeats Sharmba Mitchell by 6th round TKO
- November 26 - Wladimir Sidorenko defeats Jose de Jesus Lopez by unanimous decision to retain the WBA bantamweight title
- November 26 - Ricky Hatton defeats Carlos Maussa by ninth-round KO to unify the WBA, IBF, The Ring and Lineal light welterweight.

==== December ====
- December 3 - Jermain Taylor retains the middleweight title as he defeats Bernard Hopkins by unanimous decision.
- December 10 - Arthur Abraham defeats Kingsley Ikeke by fifth-round TKO to win the vacant IBF middleweight title
- December 10 - Danny Williams defeats Audley Harrison by split decision to win the vacant Commonwealth heavyweight title
  - Matt Skelton defeats John McDermott by 1st round TKO to retain the British heavyweight
  - Amir Khan defeats Daniel Thorpe by 2nd round TKO
- December 10 - Winky Wright defeats Sam Soliman by unanimous decision in a WBC & IBF middleweight eliminator
- December 17 - Nikolai Valuev defeats John Ruiz to win the WBA World Heavyweight Title for the first time

=== 2006 ===
==== January ====
- January 7 - Carlos Baldomir upsets Zab Judah to win the WBC welterweight title, as well as being the recognized welterweight champion, as Judah was the undisputed champion at the time of the bout.
  - On the undercard of the Baldomir/Judah bout, O'Neil Bell becomes the second undisputed Cruiserweight Champion, as he defeats Frenchman Jean-Marc Mormeck by knockout in the 10th.
- January 14 - Mikkel Kessler defeats Éric Lucas by 10th-round TKO to retain the WBA super middleweight title.
- January 20 - Valdemir Pereira defeats Fahprakorb Rakkiatgym by unanimous decision to win the vacant IBF featherweight title.
- January 21 - Manny Pacquiao exacts his revenge on Erik Morales by stopping him in the 10th round, in a WBC super featherweight eliminator.
- January 27 - Virgil Hill defeats Valery Brudov by unanimous decision.
- January 28 - Markus Beyer defeats Alberto Colajanni by 12th round TKO to retain the WBC super middleweight title.
- January 28 - Arturo Gatti defeats Thomas Damgaard by 11th round TKO.
- January 29 - Takashi Koshimoto defeats Chi In-jin by split decision to win the WBC featherweight title.

==== February ====
- February 18 - Alex Arthur defeats Ricky Burns by unanimous decision to retain the British, European and Commonwealth super featherweight title.
- February 24 - Shane Mosley defeats Fernando Vargas by 10th round TKO, in a WBA light middleweight title eliminator.
- February 25 - Danny Williams defeats Matt Skelton by split decision to win the Commonwealth heavyweight title.

==== March ====
- March 4 - Chris John defeats Juan Manuel Márquez by unanimous decision to retain the WBA featherweight title.
- March 4 - Arthur Abraham defeats Shannan Taylor by unanimous decision to retain the IBF middleweight title.
- March 4 - Joe Calzaghe defeats Jeff Lacy by lopsided unanimous decision to unify the IBF and WBO super middleweight titles.
- March 11 - Volodymyr Sydorenko draws with Ricardo Cordoba to retain the WBA bantamweight title.
- March 18 - Somsak Sithchatchawal defeats Mahyar Monshipour by 10th-round KO to win the WBA super bantamweight title. The fight was later named the 2006 Ring Magazine fight of the year.
- March 18 - Hasim Rahman defends his WBC Heavyweight title against James Toney; the fight ends in a draw.
- March 24 - Edison Miranda defeats Howard Eastman by 7th round TKO in a IBF middleweight eliminator.
- March 25 - Hozumi Hasegawa defeats Veeraphol Sahaprom by 9th round KO in their rematch to retain his WBC bantamweight title.

==== April ====
- April 1 - Siarhei Liakhovich wins the WBO heavyweight title from Lamon Brewster by unanimous decision.
- April 8 - Floyd Mayweather Jr. defeats Zab Judah by unanimous decision to win the IBF welterweight title. A mini-riot ensues as Roger Mayweather, Floyd's uncle and trainer, runs into the ring, retaliating to a low blow and rabbit punch by Judah.
  - Juan Díaz defeats José Cotto by unanimous decision to retain the WBA lightweight title
- April 22 - Wladimir Klitschko wins the IBF world heavyweight title from Chris Byrd by TKO in round 7 in their rematch.

==== May ====
- May 6 - José Antonio Rivera defeats Alejandro García by unanimous decision to win the WBA light middleweight title
- May 6 - Oscar De La Hoya returns from a 20-month break and defeats Ricardo Mayorga for the WBC super welterweight title.
- May 11 - Former two-time heavyweight champion Floyd Patterson dies from complications of Alzheimer’s disease and prostate cancer.
- May 13 - Clinton Woods defeats Jason DeLisle by 6th round TKO to retain the IBF light heavyweight title.
- May 13 - Ricky Hatton defeats Luis Collazo by unanimous decision to win the WBA welterweight title.
  - Eric Aiken defeats Valdemir Pereira to win the IBF featherweight title, after Pereira is disqualified for repeated low blows.
- May 20 - Marco Antonio Barrera defeats Rocky Juarez by split decision. Juarez was competitive throughout the fight, breaking Barrera's nose in the early rounds. The fight was originally announced as a draw, until it was later revealed that there were two scorecard tabulation errors.
- May 26 - Carl Froch defeats Brian Magee by 11th round KO to retain the British and Commonwealth super middleweight titles.

==== June ====
- June 3 - Nikolai Valuev defeats Owen Beck by 3rd round TKO to retain the WBA heavyweight title.
- June 3 - Vic Darchinyan defeats Luis Maldonado by 8th round TKO to retain the IBF flyweight title.
- June 10 - Bernard Hopkins defeats Antonio Tarver by unanimous decision to take the light heavyweight world championship.
- June 10 - Miguel Cotto defeats Paulie Malignaggi by unanimous decision to retain the WBO light welterweight belt.
- June 17 – Winky Wright and Jermain Taylor fight ends in a draw for the undisputed middleweight championship of the world in Memphis, Tennessee
- June 30 – Pongsaklek Wonjongkam defeats Everardo Morales by 4th round TKO to retain the WBC flyweight title.
- June 30 – Juan Urango defeats Naoufel Ben Rabah by unanimous decision to win the vacant IBF light welterweight title.

==== July ====
- July 2 - Manny Pacquiao defeats Óscar Larios by unanimous decision
- July 8 - Matt Skelton defeats Danny Williams by unanimous decision in their rematch to regain the Commonwealth heavyweight title
- July 8 - Cory Spinks defeats Roman Karmazin by majority decision to win the IBF light middleweight title.
- July 15 - Shane Mosley defeats Fernando Vargas in their rematch by 6th round TKO
  - Juan Díaz defeats Randy Suico by 9th round TKO to retain the WBA lightweight title
- July 22 - Carlos Baldomir defends his welterweight title as he defeats Arturo Gatti by 9th round knockout.
- July 29 - Rodolfo López defeats Takashi Koshimoto by 7th round TKO to win the WBC featherweight title.
- July 29 - Lineal light heavyweight champion Zsolt Erdei defeats Thomas Ulrich by unanimous decision to retain the WBO belt.
- July 29 - Gairy St. Clair defeats Cassius Baloyi by unanimous decision to win the IBF super featherweight title.
- July 29 - Roy Jones Jr. defeats Prince Badi Ajamu by unanimous decision

==== August ====
- August 5 - Edwin Valero wins the WBA super featherweight title by defeating Vicente Mosquera by 10th-round TKO in Mosquera's home country, Panama.
- August 5 - Rafael Márquez defeats Silence Mabuza by 9th round RTD to retain the IBF bantamweight title.
- August 12 - Oleg Maskaev knocks out Hasim Rahman in the 12th round to win the WBC Heavyweight title.

==== September ====
- September 2 - Clinton Woods defeats Glen Johnson by split decision to win the IBF light heavyweight title
  - Souleymane M'baye defeats Raúl Balbi by 4th round stoppage to win the vacant WBA light welterweight title
  - Amir Khan defeats Ryan Barrett by 1st round TKO.
- September 2 - Samuel Peter defeats James Toney by split decision in a WBC heavyweight title eliminator
  - Robert Guerrero defeats Eric Aiken by eighth-round stoppage to win the IBF featherweight title
- September 9 - Chris John defeats Renan Acosta by unanimous decision to retain the WBA featherweight title
- September 15 - Junior Witter defeats DeMarcus Corley by unanimous decision to win the vacant WBC light welterweight title
- September 16 - Marco Antonio Barrera defeats Rocky Juarez in their rematch and successfully defends his WBC super featherweight title.
- September 23 - Arthur Abraham defeats Edison Miranda by unanimous decision to retain the IBF middleweight title

==== October ====
- October 3 - Celestino Caballero defeats Somsak Sithchatchawal by 3rd round TKO to win the WBA super bantamweight title
- October 7 - Nikolai Valuev defeats Monte Barrett by 11th-round TKO to retain the WBA heavyweight title
  - Tomasz Adamek defeats Paul Briggs by majority decision to retain the WBC light heavyweight title
- October 7 - Joel Casamayor defeats Diego Corrales by split decision to win the WBC and The Ring lightweight titles
  - Vic Darchinyan defeats Glenn Donaire by technical decision to retain the IBF flyweight
- October 14 - Mikkel Kessler unifies the WBC and WBA Super middleweight titles after knocking out Markus Beyer in three rounds.
- October 14 - Joe Calzaghe defeats Sakio Bika by unanimous decision to retain the IBF, The Ring and WBO super middleweight titles
  - Enzo Maccarinelli defeats Mark Hobson by first-round stoppage to retain the WBO cruiserweight title
- October 28 - Kermit Cintrón defeats Mark Suárez by 6th round TKO to win the vacant IBF welterweight title

==== November ====
- November 4 - Malcolm Klassen defeats Gairy St. Clair by split decision to win the IBF super featherweight title
- November 4 - Floyd Mayweather Jr. becomes the WBC and lineal Welterweight champion after he defeats champion Carlos Baldomir by unanimous decision.
- November 4 - Shannon Briggs defeats Siarhei Liakhovich to win the WBO heavyweight title
- November 10 - Steve Molitor defeats Michael Hunter by 5th round knockout to win the vacant IBF super bantamweight title
- November 11 - Wladimir Klitschko defends his IBF heavyweight title by defeating American contender Calvin Brock by a stunning knockout in the 7th round.
- November 13 - Hozumi Hasegawa defeats Genaro Garcia by unanimous decision to retain the WBC bantamweight title
  - Eagle Kyowa defeats Lorenzo Trejo by unanimous decision to retain the WBC strawweight title
- November 16 - Héctor Velázquez defeats Bobby Pacquiao by disqualification
- November 17 - Pongsaklek Wonjongkam defeats Monelisi Mhikiza Myekeni by unanimous decision to retain the WBC flyweight
- November 17 - David Haye defeats Giacobbe Fragomeni by 9th round TKO to retain the European cruiserweight title
- November 18 - Manny Pacquiao knocks out Erik Morales in the 3rd round of their third and final match.
- November 25 - Krzysztof Wlodarczyk defeats Steve Cunningham by split decision to win the vacant IBF cruiserweight title

==== December ====
- December 2 - Miguel Cotto defeats Carlos Quintana by 5th round RTD to win the vacant WBA welterweight title
  - Antonio Margarito defeats Joshua Clottey by unanimous decision to retain the WBO welterweight belt
- December 2 - Winky Wright defeats Ike Quartey by unanimous decision.
- December 9 - Audley Harrison defeats Danny Williams by 3rd round TKO in their rematch
  - Amir Khan defeats Rachid Drilzane by unanimous decision
  - John Simpson defeats Andy Morris by fifth round TKO to win the British featherweight title
- December 9 - Jermain Taylor defeats Kassim Ouma by unanimous decision to retain the WBC, The Ring and WBO middleweight titles
- December 10 - Oleg Maskaev defeats Okello Peter by unanimous decision to retain the WBC heavyweight title
- December 17 - Injin Chi defeats Rodolfo López by unanimous decision to regain the WBC featherweight title
- December 18 - Joan Guzmán defeats Antonio Davis by unanimous decision to retain the WBO super featherweight title

=== 2007 ===
==== January ====
- January 6 - Samuel Peter defeats James Toney by unanimous decision in their rematch. Peter becomes the No. 1 challenger for WBC Heavyweight champion Oleg Maskaev.
- January 20 - Nikolay Valuev defends his WBA Heavyweight title by defeating Jameel McCline by technical knockout after McCline blew out his knee.
- January 20 - Ricky Hatton beats previously unbeaten Juan Urango by unanimous decision.
- January 27 - Zsolt Erdei defeats Danny Santiago by 7th round TKO to retain the Lineal and WBO light heavyweight titles.

==== February ====
- February 3 - Chad Dawson becomes WBC Light Heavyweight champion after defeating Tomasz Adamek by unanimous decision. Despite being knocked down from a straight right hand in round 10, Dawson dominates most of the fight with his speed.
- February 10 - Shane Mosley defeats Luis Collazo by unanimous decision.
- February 17 - Michael Sprott defeats Audley Harrison by third-round KO to win the European Union heavyweight title
  - Michael Katsidis defeats Graham Earl by 5th round retirement to win the vacant WBO interim lightweight title
  - Amir Khan defeats Mohammed Medjadi by 1st round KO.

==== March ====
- March 3 - Chris John defeats Jose Rojas by unanimous decision to retain the WBA featherweight title.
- March 3 - Miguel Cotto defeats Oktay Urkal by 11th round TKO to retain WBA welterweight title.
- March 3 - Rafael Márquez moves up in weight class and defeats Ring Magazine and WBC Super Bantamweight champion Israel Vázquez by 7th-round technical knockout. Vazquez did not answer the bell after badly breaking his nose and having trouble breathing.
- March 10 - Wladimir Klitschko defends his IBF Heavyweight title by defeating Ray Austin by 2nd-round knockout.
- March 10 - Souleymane M'baye defeats Andreas Kotelnik by split decision to retain the WBA light welterweight title
- March 17 - Jean-Marc Mormeck defeats O'Neil Bell by unanimous decision in their rematch to win the WBA, WBC, The Ring and lineal cruiserweight titles.
- March 17 - Juan Manuel Márquez defeats Marco Antonio Barrera by unanimous decision to become the WBC Super Featherweight champion. In the seventh round there was controversy, as Marquez thoroughly dominated the round then got knocked down by Barrera. Referee Jay Nady ruled this a slip, then penalized Barrera for hitting while Marquez was on the canvas.
- March 24 - Mikkel Kessler defends his WBA and WBC Super middleweight titles by defeating Librado Andrade by a shutout unanimous decision.

==== April ====
- April 7 - Joe Calzaghe defends his WBO and Ring Magazine super middleweight titles by defeating Peter Manfredo (of The Contender fame) by a 3rd-round technical knockout.
- April - HBO airs De la Hoya/Mayweather 24/7 for three weeks to hype the highly anticipated matchup between Oscar De La Hoya and Floyd Mayweather Jr.
- April 14 - Ruslan Chagaev becomes the new WBA Heavyweight Champion after defeating Nicolay Valuev by majority decision.
- April 14 - Manny Pacquiao defeats Jorge Solís by eighth-round KO
- April 27 - Felix Sturm defeats Javier Castillejo by unanimous decision in their rematch to win the WBA middleweight title
  - Stipe Drews defeats Silvio Branco by unanimous decision to win the WBA light heavyweight title
- April 28 - Juan Díaz unifies the WBA and WBO Lightweight titles after defeating Acelino Freitas. Freitas refused to answer the bell before round nine.

==== May ====
- May 5 - In a highly anticipated matchup, Floyd Mayweather Jr. defeats Oscar De La Hoya by split decision, taking the WBC junior middleweight title. Despite being one of the richest fights in the history of the sport, the fight generally did not match the hype.
- May 7 - Former super featherweight and lightweight champion Diego Corrales dies in a motorcycle accident near his home in Las Vegas. Corrales died on the second anniversary of his thrilling first fight against José Luis Castillo, regarded as one of the greatest fights in modern history.
- May 19 - Jermain Taylor defeats Cory Spinks by split decision to retain the WBC, WBO, The Ring and lineal middleweight titles
- May 26 - Steve Cunningham defeats Krzysztof Wlodarczyk by majority decision to win the IBF cruiserweight title
- May 26 - Arthur Abraham defeats Sebastien Demers by 3rd round stoppage to retain the IBF middleweight title

==== June ====
- June 2 - Sultan Ibragimov defeats Shannon Briggs by unanimous decision to take the WBO heavyweight title.
- June 9 - Miguel Cotto successfully defends his WBA Welterweight title as he defeats Zab Judah by technical knockout in the 11th.
- June 9 - Chad Dawson defeats Jesus Ruiz by sixth-round TKO to retain the WBC light heavyweight title
  - Antonio Tarver defeats Elvir Muriqi by unanimous decision to win the vacant IBO light heavyweight title
- June 16 - Zsolt Erdei defeats George Blades by 11th round TKO to retain the WBO and Lineal light-heavyweight titles
- June 16 - Paulie Malignaggi defeats Lovemore N'dou by unanimous decision to retain the IBF light welterweight title
- June 23 - Ricky Hatton defends his The Ring light welterweight crown as he defeats José Luis Castillo by knockout. Hatton hits him with a perfect liver punch, putting him on the canvas for the first time in his pro career.

==== July ====
- July 7 - Wladimir Klitschko defeats Lamon Brewster by 6th round TKO in their rematch to retain the IBF and IBO heavyweight titles.
- July 7 - Vic Darchinyan loses his IBF and IBO flyweight titles, getting knocked out by Nonito Donaire in five rounds.
- July 14 - Steven Luevano defeats Nicky Cook by 11th round KO to win the vacant WBO featherweight title.
  - Matt Skelton defeats Michael Sprott by majority decision to retain the Commonwealth heavyweight title.
  - Amir Khan defeats Willie Limond by 8th round retirement to win the Commonwealth lightweight title.
- July 14 - Kermit Cintrón defeats Walter Matthysse by 2nd round KO to retain the IBF welterweight title
  - Arturo Gatti retires following a TKO defeat to Alfonso Gómez
- July 14 - Paul Williams becomes the WBO welterweight champion as he defeats Antonio Margarito by unanimous decision.
- July 18 - Daisuke Naito upsets Pongsaklek Wonjongkam, who had previously beaten him twice, by unanimous decision. Naito ends Wonjongkam's six-year run as WBC flyweight champion.
- July 21 - Enzo Maccarinelli defeats Wayne Braithwaite by unanimous decision to retain WBO cruiserweight title.
  - Gavin Rees defeats Souleymane M'baye by unanimous decision to win the WBA light welterweight title.
  - Alex Arthur defeats Koba Gogoladze by 10th round TKO vacant interim WBO super featherweight title.
- July 21 - Bernard Hopkins beats Winky Wright by unanimous decision to retain The Ring light heavyweight title.
  - Jorge Linares defeats Óscar Larios by 10th round TKO to win the vacant WBC interim featherweight title.
- July 28 - Vernon Forrest defeats Carlos Baldomir by unanimous decision to vacant WBC light middleweight title.

==== August ====
- August 4 - David Díaz defeats Erik Morales by unanimous decision to win the vacant WBC lightweight title. This was Morales' fourth consecutive defeat and he would not fight again until 2010.
  - Ulises Solis defeats Rodel Mayol by 10th round KO to retain the IBF light flyweight title.
- August 4 - Israel Vázquez defeats Rafael Márquez by technical knockout in the 6th round of their rematch to recapture the WBC super bantamweight title. The two traded punches throughout the fight before Vázquez dominated Márquez in the sixth round, causing the referee to stop the fight.
- August 25 - Iván Calderón defeats Hugo Fidel Cazares in a split decision to win the WBO Light Flyweight title and to become The Ring Magazine Jr. Flyweight champion. This was Calderon's first fight at Light Flyweight.

==== September ====
- September 1 - Ricardo Torres defeats Kendall Holt by 11th-round TKO to retain the WBO light welterweight title.
- September 7 - Junior Witter defeats Vivian Harris by 7th round KO to retain the WBC light welterweight title.
- September 29 - Clinton Woods defeats Julio César González by unanimous decision to retain the IBF light heavyweight title.
- September 29 - Kelly Pavlik upsets Jermain Taylor by 7th round TKO to win the WBC, WBO and universally recognized middleweight championship. Pavlik was knocked down in the second round but rallied back against a tired Taylor.
- September 29 - Chad Dawson defeats Epifanio Mendoza by 4th round stoppage to retain the WBC light heavyweight title
  - Joseph Agbeko defeats Luis Alberto Pérez buy 7th round RTD to win the IBF bantamweight title

==== October ====
- October 6 - Samuel Peter defeats Jameel McCline by unanimous decision to win the WBC interim heavyweight title.
- October 6 - Manny Pacquiao defeats Marco Antonio Barrera by unanimous decision. Barrera would announce his retirement after the fight.
  - Steven Luevano defeats Antonio Davis by unanimous decision to retain the WBO featherweight title.
- October 13 - Sultan Ibragimov defeats Evander Holyfield by 12-round Unanimous Decision and retains the WBO Heavyweight title.
- October 13 - Juan Díaz defeats Julio Diaz by 9th round TKO to unify the WBA, IBF and WBO lightweight titles.
  - John Ruiz defeats Otis Tisdale by 2nd round TKO.
- October 19 - Lucian Bute defeats Alejandro Berrio by 11th round TKO to retain the IBF super middleweight title.
- October 20 - Felix Sturm draws with Randy Griffin retaining the WBA middleweight title.

==== November ====
- November 3 - Joe Calzaghe defeats Mikkel Kessler by unanimous decision in a unification bout for the WBA, WBC, WBO and The Ring super middleweight titles. Calzaghe surpasses the 20 defenses made by Bernard Hopkins and Larry Holmes at middleweight and heavyweight respectively.
- November 3 - Juan Manuel Márquez defeats Rocky Juarez by unanimous decision to retain WBC super featherweight title.
  - Robert Guerrero defeats Martin Honorio by 1st round TKO to retain the IBF featherweight title.
- November 9 - Carl Froch defeats Robin Reid by 5th round TKO to retain the British super middleweight title.
- November 10 - David Haye beats Jean-Marc Mormeck by a 7th-round TKO to win the WBC, WBA, The Ring and lineal cruiserweight titles.
- November 10 - Miguel Cotto defeats Shane Mosley by unanimous decision to retain the WBA welterweight title.
  - Joel Casamayor retains his The Ring Lightweight title with a highly controversial split decision over José Santa Cruz.
- November 23 - Kermit Cintrón defeats Jesse Feliciano by 10th round TKO to retain IBF welterweight title
  - Ricardo Mayorga defeats Fernando Vargas by majority decision
- November 24 - Zsolt Erdei defeats Tito Mendoza by split decision to retain the WBO and Lineal light heavyweight titles.

==== December ====
- December 1 - Vernon Forrest defeats Michele Piccirillo by 11th round TKO to retain WBC light middleweight title.
- December 8 - Floyd Mayweather Jr. defends his WBC and Ring Welterweight titles, defeating Ricky Hatton by 10th-round technical knockout.
- December 15 - Jorge Linares defeats Gamaliel Diaz by 8th round TKO to retain the WBC featherweight title.
  - Edwin Valero defeats Zaid Zavaleta by 3rd round TKO to retain the WBA super-featherweight title.
- December 16 - Danny Green defeats Stipe Drews to win the WBA Light Heavyweight title. This is Green's first successful world title match after trying to win the WBC Super Middleweight Title twice.
- December 29 - Steve Cunningham defeats Marco Huck by 12 round TKO to retain the IBF cruiserweight title.
  - José Alfaro defeats Prawet Singwancha on points.

=== 2008 ===
==== January ====
- January 5 - Paulie Malignaggi defeats Herman Ngoudjo by unanimous decision to retain the IBF light-welterweight title.
- January 10 - Hozumi Hasegawa defeats Simone Maludrottu by unanimous decision to retain the WBC bantamweight title.
  - Volodymyr Sydorenko defeats Nobuto Ikehara by unanimous decision to retain the WBA bantamweight title.
- January 19 - Ruslan Chagaev defends his WBA Heavyweight title, defeating Matt Skelton by unanimous decision.
- January 19 - Roy Jones Jr. defeats Félix Trinidad by unanimous decision. In his first fight in two years and second in five, Trinidad was down twice.

==== February ====
- February 9 - Carlos Quintana defeats unbeaten Paul Williams by unanimous decision to win the WBO welterweight belt.
- February 16 - Kelly Pavlik defeats Jermain Taylor by unanimous decision in a rematch of their 2007 encounter.
- February 23 - Wladimir Klitschko unifies the IBF and WBO heavyweight titles as he defeats Sultan Ibragimov by unanimous decision in Madison Square Garden in the first heavyweight unification bout since 1999.
- February 29 - Lucian Bute defeats William Joppy by 10th TKO to retain his IBF super middleweight title
- February 29 - Robert Guerrero defeats Jason Litzau by eighth-round stoppage to retain his IBF featherweight title.

==== March ====
- March 1 - Israel Vázquez successfully defends the WBC and Ring Magazine titles as he defeats Rafael Márquez by split decision.
- March 8 - David Haye unifies the WBA, WBC, WBO, The Ring and lineal cruiserweight titles as he defeats Enzo Maccarinelli by a 2nd-round technical knockout.
- March 8 - Samuel Peter wins the WBC Heavyweight title as he defeats Oleg Maskaev by 6th-round TKO.
  - Nate Campbell upsets Juan Díaz by split decision. Campbell becomes the unified WBA, IBF and WBO champion.
- March 15 - Manny Pacquiao becomes the Ring Magazine and WBC super featherweight champion as he defeats Juan Manuel Márquez by split decision.
- March 22 - Andreas Kotelnik defeats Gavin Rees by 12th round TKO to win his WBA light-welterweight title
- March 22 - Joel Casamayor defeats Michael Katsidis by 10th-round technical knockout to defend the Ring Magazine Lightweight championship. In a thrilling back-and-forth fight, Casamayor knocked down Katsidis twice in the opening round, only to have Katsidis come back with a knockdown in the 6th. Casamayor knocked Katsidis down again in the 10th, hurting him in the process, and the referee called a halt to the contest.
- March 27 - Verno Phillips defeats Cory Spinks by split decision to win the IBF light-middleweight title

==== April ====
- April 5 - Felix Sturm defeats Jamie Pittman by 7th round TKO to retain the WBA middleweight title.
- April 12 - Antonio Tarver gains the IBF Light Heavyweight title as he defeats Clinton Woods by unanimous decision.
  - Chad Dawson defeats Glen Johnson by a close unanimous decision and retains his WBC Light Heavyweight title.
- April 12 - Miguel Cotto defeats former Contender star Alfonso Gómez to retain the WBA Welterweight title. The fight doctor put a halt on the contest before the start of the 6th round.
  - Antonio Margarito knocks out Kermit Cintrón in the 6th round to gain the IBF Welterweight title.
- April 19 - Joe Calzaghe defeats Bernard Hopkins in Las Vegas by split decision to gain the Ring Light Heavyweight championship.
- April 26 - Zsolt Erdei defeats DeAndrey Abron by unanimous decision to retain the WBO and Lineal light heavyweight titles.
  - Serhiy Dzyndzyruk defeats Lukáš Konečný by unanimous decision to retain the WBO super-welterweight title.

==== May ====
- May 3 - Oscar De La Hoya defeats Steve Forbes by unanimous decision.
- May 10 - Timothy Bradley defeats Junior Witter by split decision to win the WBC light-welterweight title.
  - Carl Froch defeats Albert Rybacki by 4th round TKO.
- May 24 - At the City of Manchester Stadium, Ricky Hatton defends his Ring and Lineal light welterweight titles against Juan Lazcano, winning by unanimous decision
  - Paulie Malignaggi defeats Lovemore N'dou by split decision to retain the IBF light-welterweight title

==== June ====
- June 7 - Sergio Mora defeats Vernon Forrest by majority decision to win the WBC light-middleweight belt
  - Paul Williams defeats Carlos Quintana by 1st round TKO in their rematch to regain the WBO welterweight belt
- June 7 - Kelly Pavlik defeats Gary Lockett by 3rd round KO to retain the WBC, WBO, The Ring and Lineal middleweight titles
  - Juan Manuel Lopez defeats Daniel Ponce de León by 1st round KO to win the WBO super bantamweight title
  - Kevin Mitchell defeats Walter Estrada by unanimous decision.
- June 21 - Mikkel Kessler defeats Dimitri Sartison by 12th round KO to win the vacant WBA (Regular) super middleweight title
- June 21 - Andre Berto defeats Miguel Rodriguez by 7th round TKO to win the vacant WBC welterweight title
- June 28 - Manny Pacquiao defeats David Díaz via 9th-round knockout to take the WBC lightweight crown, his fifth world title in five weight divisions.

==== July ====
- July 3 - Hugo Garay defeats Yuri Barashian by unanimous decision to win the vacant WBA light heavyweight title
- July 5 - Felix Sturm defeats Randy Griffin by unanimous decision to retain WBA middleweight title
- July 5 - Kendall Holt defeats Ricardo Torres by 1st round TKO to win the WBO light welterweight title
- July 11 - Daniel Santos defeats Joachim Alcine by 6th round KO to win the WBA light middleweight title
- July 12 - Wladimir Klitschko defeats Tony Thompson by 11th round KO to retain the IBF, WBO and IBO heavyweight titles
- July 26 - Antonio Margarito knocks out Miguel Cotto in the 11th to gain the WBA Welterweight title. Cotto managed to control the early rounds, but Margarito came back with relentless pressure, eventually winning one of the greatest fights of the year. But the handwrap controversy surrounding Margarito was later to call the victory's validity into question.

==== August ====
- August 2 - Joshua Clottey defeats Zab Judah by 9th round technical decision to retain the IBF welterweight title
- August 30 - Nikolai Valuev defeats John Ruiz by unanimous decision in their rematch to win the vacant WBA heavyweight title

==== September ====
- September 6 - Nicky Cook defeats Alex Arthur by unanimous decision to win the WBO super featherweight title
  - Breidis Prescott upset Amir Khan by 1st round KO
  - Audley Harrison defeats George Arias by unanimous decision
- September 13 - Juan Manuel Márquez defeats Joel Casamayor by stopping him in the 11th round after two knockdowns to capture The Ring Magazine Lightweight title
  - Vernon Forrest defeats Sergio Mora by unanimous decision in their rematch to regain the WBC light-middleweight title
- September 15 - Roman Gonzalez knocks out Yutaka Niida to become the WBA minimumweight champion.
- September 27 - Guillermo Jones defeats Firat Arslan by 10th round TKO to win the WBA cruiserweight title
- September 27 - Shane Mosley defeats Ricardo Mayorga by 12th round KO
  - Andre Berto defeats Steve Forbes defeats unanimous decision to retain the WBC welterweight title

==== October ====
- October 11 - In his first fight in four years, Vitali Klitschko dominates Samuel Peter to regain the WBC heavyweight title.
- October 11 - Chad Dawson defeats Antonio Tarver by unanimous decision to win the IBF and IBO light heavyweight titles
- October 18 - Bernard Hopkins beats undefeated Kelly Pavlik via unanimous decision. Despite being 17 years older than Pavlik, Hopkins outworked and outhustled him throughout the fight.
- October 23 - Cristóbal Cruz defeats Orlando Salido by split decision to win the vacant IBF featherweight title
- October 24 - Chris John defeats Hiroyuki Enoki by unanimous decision to retain the WBA featherweight title
- October 24 - Lucian Bute defeats Librado Andrade by unanimous decision to retain the IBF super-middleweight title
- October 25 - Mikkel Kessler defeats Danilo Haussler by third-round KO to retain the WBA super-middleweight title

==== November ====
- November 8 - Arthur Abraham defeats Raúl Márquez by 6th round TKO to retain IBF middleweight
- November 8 - Joe Calzaghe defeats Roy Jones Jr. in New York City by unanimous decision to retain the Ring Magazine Light Heavyweight title. Despite being put down in the 1st round, Calzaghe controlled the succeeding rounds to win the decision.
- November 15 - David Haye defeats Monte Barrett by 5th round TKO
- November 22 - Hugo Garay defeats Jürgen Brähmer by unanimous decision to retain the WBA light-heavyweight title
- November 22 - Ricky Hatton stops Paul Malignaggi in the 11th round to retain the Ring Magazine Light Welterweight title.

==== December ====
- December 6 - Carl Froch defeats Jean Pascal by unanimous decision win the vacant WBC super middleweight championship.
- December 6 - Amir Khan defeats Oisin Fagan by 2nd round TKO.
- December 6 - Manny Pacquiao defeats Oscar De La Hoya after eight rounds in a fight billed as "The Dream Match." When De La Hoya couldn't answer the bell for the ninth round, it was officially a technical knockout
- December 11 - Tomasz Adamek bt Steve Cunningham by split decision to win the IBF cruiserweight title
  - Joseph Agbeko bt William Gonzalez by majority decision to retain the IBF bantamweight title
- December 13 - Wladimir Klitschko beats Hasim Rahman by 7th-round TKO to retain the IBF, WBO and IBO heavyweight titles
- December 13 - Kendall Holt defeats Demetrius Hopkins by split decision (WBO light-welterweight).
- December 20 - Nikolai Valuev defeats Evander Holyfield by controversial majority decision to retain the WBA heavyweight title, preventing Holyfield from breaking George Foreman's as the oldest heavyweight champion in history. This would to be the final world title bout in Holyfield's long career.

=== 2009 ===
==== January ====
- January 3 - Toshiaki Nishioka defeats Genaro Garcia by 12th round TKO to retain WBC super bantamweight title
- January 10 - Zsolt Erdei defeats Yuri Barashian by unanimous decision to retain the WBO light-heavyweight title
  - Karoly Balzsay defeats Denis Inkin by unanimous decision to win the WBO super-middleweight title
- January 17 - Andre Berto defeats Luis Collazo by unanimous decision to retain the WBC welterweight title
- January 24 - Shane Mosley defeats Antonio Margarito to win the WBA welterweight title by 9th-round TKO. Controversy erupted before the fight when it was discovered that Margarito had an illegal plaster-like substance in his gloves. Margarito and his trainer had their boxing licenses revoked.
- January 30 - Former heavyweight champion 1959–60 Ingemar Johansson dies from complications of pneumonia and had suffered from Alzheimer’s disease.
- January 30 - Juan Urango defeats Herman Ngoudjo by unanimous decision to win vacant IBF light-welterweight title

==== February ====
- February 5 - Ring light heavyweight champion Joe Calzaghe retires unbeaten in 46 bouts as a two weight champion
- February 7 - Ruslan Chagaev defeats Carl Drumond by sixth-round technical decision
  - Andreas Kotelnik defeats Marcos Maidana by split decision to retain the WBA light-welterweight title
- February 21 - Miguel Cotto defeats Michael Jennings by 5th round TKO to win the vacant WBO welterweight title
- February 21 - Kelly Pavlik beat Marco Antonio Rubio by stoppage in the 9th round. This was Pavlik's second defense of his WBC, WBO, The Ring and Lineal middleweight titles.
- February 27 - Tomasz Adamek defeats Johnathon Banks by 8th round TKO to retain the IBF and The Ring cruiserweight titles
- February 28 - Juan Manuel Márquez defeats Juan Díaz via 9th-round TKO to bag the WBA and WBO lightweight titles. The 14,571 spectators in attendance at the Toyota Center was the largest in Texas boxing history. This fight was later named the fight of the year.
- February 28 - Román González beats Francisco Rosas to get the WBA minimumweight title for the second time.

==== March ====
- March 1 - Israel Vázquez defeats Rafael Márquez by split decision to retain the WBC and The Ring super-bantamweight titles in the third bout of their rivalry.
- March 12 - Hozumi Hasegawa defeats Vusi Malinga by first-round stoppage to retain the WBC bantamweight title
  - Takahiro Aoh defeats Óscar Larios by unanimous decision in their rematch to win the WBC featherweight title
- March 13 - Lucian Bute defeats Fulgencio Zuniga by fourth-round stoppage to retain the IBF super-middleweight title
- March 14 - Arthur Abraham defeats Lajuan Simon by unanimous decision to retain the IBF middleweight title
- March 14 - Amir Khan defeats Marco Antonio Barrera after the fight was stopped toward the end of the 5th round. Barrera suffering a severe cut, reopened from his previous fight, by a clash of heads late in the opening round. With Barrera deemed in no position to fight on by the ringside doctor, the fight went to the scorecards where Khan was ahead on all three.
  - Román Martínez defeats Nicky Cook by 4th round TKO to win the WBO super-featherweight title
  - Ola Afolabi defeats Enzo Maccarinelli by 9th round TKO to win the vacant interim WBO cruiserweight title
- March 21 - Vitali Klitschko defeats Juan Carlos Gómez by 9th round TKO
- March 21 - Roy Jones Jr. knocks out Omar Sheika in the 5th round to win the vacant NABO light heavyweight title. This was Jones' first knockout win in 6½ years. The undercard featured MMA fights.

==== April ====
- April 4 - Timothy Bradley defeats Kendall Holt by unanimous decision to unify the WBC and WBO light-welterweight titles
- April 4 - Edwin Valero defeats Antonio Pitalua by 2nd round stoppage to win vacant WBC lightweight title
- April 11 - Paul Williams defeats Winky Wright by unanimous decision
- April 19 - Nonito Donaire defeats Raul Martinez by 4th round TKO to retain the IBF flyweight title
  - Brian Viloria defeats Ulises Solis by 11th round KO to win the IBF light flyweight title
- April 24 - Cory Spinks defeats Deandre Latimore by split decision to win vacant IBF light-middleweight title
- April 25 - Felix Sturm defeats Koji Sato by 7th round TKO to retain the WBA middleweight title.
- April 25 - Carl Froch beats Jermain Taylor via 12th-round TKO. This was Froch's first defense of his WBC super middleweight title. Froch was knocked down in the 3rd round, and Taylor was knocked down in the 12th.

==== May ====
- May 2 - Manny Pacquiao stops Ricky Hatton after two brutal rounds in a fight billed as "The Battle of East and West" in Las Vegas. During the 1st round, Pacquiao knocked down Hatton twice. In the 2nd round, Pacquiao continued to rain Hatton with furious combinations, eventually knocking him out with a thunderous left hook. For his win, Pacquiao took the IBO and The Ring light welterweight titles. The fight was named the knockout of the year.
- May 9 - Chad Dawson defeats Antonio Tarver by decision. This was Dawson's first defense of his IBF and IBO light heavyweight titles.
- May 30 - Andre Berto defeats Juan Urango by unanimous decision to retain the WBC welterweight title.

==== June ====
- June 13 - Miguel Cotto defeats Joshua Clottey by split decision to retain the WBO welterweight title
- June 19 - Jean Pascal defeats Adrian Diaconu by unanimous decision to win the WBC light-heavyweight title
- June 20 - Wladimir Klitschko beat Ruslan Chagaev by RTD in the 9th round. The fight was Klitschko's seventh defense of his IBO and IBF heavyweight titles and his third defense of his WBO heavyweight title. Klitschko also won the vacant Ring heavyweight and lineal titles. The crowd of 61,000 was the biggest boxing audience in Germany since Max Schmeling knocked out Adolf Heuser in front of 70,000 in Stuttgart in 1939.

==== July ====
- July 11 - Felix Sturm defeats Khoren Gevor by unanimous decision to retain the WBA middleweight title
- July 11 - Tomasz Adamek defeats Bobby Gunn by fourth-round retirement to retain the IBF cruiserweight title
- July 11 - Joseph Agbeko defeats Vic Darchinyan by unanimous decision to retain the IBF bantamweight title
- July 11 - Cristóbal Cruz defeats Jorge Solís by unanimous decision to retain the IBF featherweight title
- July 18 - Amir Khan defeats Andreas Kotelnik by unanimous decision to win the WBA light-welterweight title
- July 25 - Former 2 division champion Vernon Forrest is murdered following a robbery at a gas station in the Atlanta neighbourhood of Mechanicsville.

==== August ====
- August 1 - Isaac Hlatshwayo defeats Delvin Rodríguez by split decision to win the vacant IBF welterweight title
- August 1 - Timothy Bradley has a no contest with Nate Campbell to retain the WBO light-welterweight title
  - Devon Alexander defeats Junior Witter by eighth-round retirement to win the vacant WBC light-welterweight title
- August 15 - Gabriel Campillo defeats Beibut Shumenov to retain the WBA light-heavyweight title
- August 15 - Roy Jones Jr. stops Jeff Lacy in the 10th round. This was Jones' first defense of his NABO light heavyweight title. The fight was entitled "Hook City".
- August 15 - Steven Luevano defeats Bernabe Concepcion by seventh-round DQ to retain the WBO featherweight title
- August 22 - Robert Stieglitz defeats Karoly Balzsay by 11th-round stoppage to win the WBO super-middleweight title
- August 22 - Robert Guerrero defeats Malcolm Klassen by unanimous decision to win the IBF super-featherweight title
- August 28 - Tavoris Cloud defeats Clinton Woods by unanimous decision to win the vacant IBF light-heavyweight title
- August 29 - Marco Huck defeats Victor Emilio Ramírez by unanimous decision to win the WBO cruiserweight title

==== September ====
- September 12 - Mikkel Kessler defeats Gusmyr Perdomo by fourth-round KO to retain the WBA super-middleweight title
- September 12 - Iván Calderón defeats Rodel Mayol to defend his WBO light flyweight title for the fifth time. The two had previously fought to a draw.
  - Román Martínez defeats Feider Viloria by ninth-round KO to retain the WBO super-featherweight title
- September 19 - Sebastian Sylvester defeats Giovanni Lorenzo by split decision to win the vacant the IBF middleweight title
- September 19 - Floyd Mayweather Jr. dominates Juan Manuel Márquez in Mayweather's comeback fight, after retiring 21 months earlier. It was the first time Marquez had fought above the 135 lb (61 kg). limit. There was some controversy over Mayweather being two pounds over the 144 lb (65 kg) weight limit, for which he later paid Marquez $600,000. The fight was aired the same night that UFC 103 was aired, however sold much better, with 600,000 more PPV buys.
  - Chris John defeats Rocky Juarez by decision after fighting Juarez to a draw earlier in the year. The fight was part of the undercard of Floyd Mayweather Jr. vs. Juan Manuel Márquez, and some journalists had thought it might turn out a better fight than the main event.
- September 26 - Vitali Klitschko knocks out undefeated Chris Arreola in the 10th round. The fight was Klitschko's fourth defense of his WBC heavyweight title.

==== October ====
- October 3 - David Tua defeats Shane Cameron in what was considered the biggest boxing event in New Zealand history.
- October 10 - Juan Manuel López beats Rogers Mtagwa by decision to defend his WBO Super Bantamweight title for the fourth time.
- October 10 - Juan Carlos Salgado knocks out Jorge Linares in the 1st round. The fight was named the upset of the year.
- October 17 - Arthur Abraham knocks out Jermain Taylor with less than 10 seconds left in the fight as part of the Super Six Tournament.
- October 17 - Carl Froch beats Andre Dirrell by split decision as part of the Super Six Tournament.
- October 24 - Tomasz Adamek beats Andrew Golota for the IBF International Heavyweight Title. This is Adamek's debut as a heavyweight.
- October 31 - Yonnhy Pérez defeats Joseph Agbeko by unanimous decision to win the IBF bantamweight title

==== November ====
- November 7 - David Haye beats Nikolai Valuev by points to become the WBA Heavyweight Champion.
- November 7 - Chad Dawson defeats Glen Johnson in a rematch to win the WBC Light Heavyweight titled and retain the IBO Light Heavyweight title.
- November 14 - Manny Pacquiao defeats Miguel Cotto by a technical knockout with 2:05 left in the fight to become the only boxer to win a world title in seven different weight divisions. As well as to win Cotto's WBO welterweight title.
  - Yuri Foreman defeats Daniel Santos by unanimous decision to win the WBA Super welterweight champion and become the first Israeli boxer to win a world title.
- November 21 - Zsolt Erdei defeats Giacobbe Fragomeni by majority decision to retain the WBC cruiserweight title
- November 21 - Andre Ward upsets Mikkel Kessler as part of the Super Six Tournament to become the WBA Super Middleweight Champion.
- November 28 - Lucian Bute knocks out Librado Andrade at the end of the fourth round as part of a rematch between the two fighters.

==== December ====
- December 2 - Danny Green knocks out Roy Jones Jr. in a shocking 2:02 KO after Green landed two solid left hands and a right cross to the temple that knocked Jones out.
- December 2 - Bernard Hopkins, at nearly 45 years old, beats Enrique Ornelas by decision.
- December 5 - Marco Huck defeats Ola Afolabi by unanimous decision to retain the WBO cruiserweight title
- December 5 - Amir Khan stops Dmitriy Salita in a seventy-six second TKO. The first knockdown came only ten seconds after the fight began. This is Salita's first career loss.
  - Kevin Mitchell defeats Breidis Prescott by unanimous decision in a WBO lightweight eliminator
- December 11 - Jan Zaveck defeats Isaac Hlatshwayo by 3rd round KO to win the IBF welterweight title
- December 11 - Jean Pascal defeats Adrian Diaconu by unanimous decision in their rematch
- December 12 - Vitali Klitschko defeats Kevin Johnson by unanimous decision
- December 19 - Kelly Pavlik defeats Miguel Espino by 5th round TKO to retain the WBC, WBO, The Ring and Lineal middleweight titles
