= Cory Spinks vs. Zab Judah II =

Boxing match

Arch Rivals...Meet Me in St. Louis
- Date: 5 February 2005
- Venue: Savvis Center, St Louis, Missouri, U.S.
- Titles on the line: WBA, WBC, IBF, and The Ring undisputed welterweight championship

Tale of the tape
Boxer	Cory Spinks	Zab Judah
Nickname	The Next Generation	Super
Hometown	St. Louis, Missouri, U.S.	Brownsville, New York, U.S.
Purse	>$1,000,000	$150,000
Pre-fight record	34–2 (11 KO)	32–2 (1) (24 KO)
Age	26 years, 11 months	27 years, 3 months
Height	5 ft 9 1/2 in (177 cm)	5 ft 7 in (170 cm)
Weight	147 lb (67 kg)	146 lb (66 kg)
Style	Southpaw	Southpaw
Recognition	WBA, WBC, IBF and The Ring; Undisputed Welterweight Champion	WBA/IBF/The Ring; No. 2 Ranked Welterweight; WBC; No. 11 Ranked Welterweight

Result
- Judah defeated Spinks by 9th round TKO

Cory Spinks vs. Zab Judah II, billed as Arch Rivals...Meet Me in St. Louis, was a professional boxing match contested on 5 February 2005, for the Undisputed welterweight championship.

== Background ==
Since winning the undisputed welterweight championship against Ricardo Mayorga in December 2003, Cory Spinks had made two successful defences of the title, the first of which saw him survive a 12th round knockdown to defeat former Light welterweight champion Zab Judah by unanimous decision.

On 4 January 2005, promoter Don King announced the rematch, to take place in Spinks' hometown of St. Louis, Missouri.

The fight was the first major bout in St. Louis in more than 40 years, and it was a 22,000+ sell-out. Rapper Nelly accompanying Spinks into the ring and lead the crowd in a singalong.

== The fight ==
Judah was the aggressor throughout the fight, coming forward behind the Jab, throwing left hands and body punches. Spinks meanwhile used his Jab and lateral movement to try and control the distance and set up counter punches to edge out the rounds. Late in the seventh round, a right left combination from Judah hurt Spinks causing the champion's knee hit the canvas just as the bell rang, which wasn't ruled a knockdown by the referee. Spinks started the ninth strongly, landing some of his most effective blows of the fight as the Judah started to get wide with his punches. As the round progressed however a left hand hurt Spinks, with the follow-up putting him on the canvas. Spinks beat the count, but Judah would land a series of hard punches left Spinks defenceless on the ropes. Another right left combination sent Spinks into the ropes at which point the referee stepped to wave it off with 11 seconds left in the round.

== Aftermath ==
Speaking after the bout Judah said "I was hungry, I was determined, it's my time, it's my era." Spinks meanwhile said "I'm very disappointed, I let a lot of people down, but I have to hold my head up. I have to take this like a man."

== Undercard ==
Confirmed bouts:

== Broadcasting ==
Country	Broadcaster
United States	Showtime

Preceded by vs. Miguel Ángel González	Cory Spinks's bouts 5 February 2005	Succeeded by vs. Roman Karmazin
Preceded by vs. Wayne Martell	Zab Judah's bouts 5 February 2005	Succeeded by vs. Cosme Rivera
