= Félix Trinidad vs. Winky Wright =

Boxing match

The Wright Choice, The Wright Challenge
- Date: May 14, 2005
- Venue: MGM Grand Garden Arena, Paradise, Nevada, U.S.
- Title(s) on the line: WBC middleweight title eliminator

Tale of the tape
Boxer	Félix Trinidad	Ronald Wright
Nickname	Tito	Winky
Hometown	Fajardo, San Juan, Puerto Rico	Washington, D.C., District of Columbia, U.S.
Purse	$8,000,000	$4,000,000
Pre-fight record	42–1 (35 KO)	48–3 (25 KO)
Age	32 years, 4 months	33 years, 5 months
Height	5 ft 11 in (180 cm)	5 ft 10 in (178 cm)
Weight	160 lb (73 kg)	160 lb (73 kg)
Style	Orthodox	Southpaw
Recognition	WBC/WBA; No. 1 Ranked Middleweight; IBF; No. 5 Ranked Middleweight; The Ring; No. 4 Ranked Middleweight; 3-division world champion	The Ring; Light Middleweight Champion; WBC; No. 2 Ranked Middleweight; WBA; No. 3 Ranked Middleweight; The Ring No. 4 ranked pound-for-pound fighter

Result
- Wright defeats Trinidad by unanimous decision

Félix Trinidad vs. Winky Wright was a professional boxing match contested on May 14, 2005.

== Background ==
After his return to the ring against Ricardo Mayorga in October 2004, Félix Trinidad was linked to rematches with both undisputed middleweight champion Bernard Hopkins and former 4-division world champion Oscar De La Hoya. Meanwhile in November, Winky Wright scored his second consecutive victory over Shane Mosley and was immediately linked to Trinidad.

Trinidad's promoter Don King had offered Wright $5 million to be Trinidad's first comeback opponent, however he was already contracted to rematch Mosley. A $5 million offer for a 19 March 2005 bout with Trinidad fell though, however on 27 January it was announced that Trinidad and Wright would face each other in a WBC middleweight title eliminator on 14 May. "It wasn't easy to get this done, but I knew it was simply a matter of time because in the end both Tito and Winky like to fight," said King.

Trinidad was an 8-5 favourite to win.

== The fights ==
=== Judah vs. Rivera ===
The co feature saw undisputed welterweight champion Zab Judah face IBF mandatory challenger Cosme Rivera, in the first defence of the title he had won against Cory Spinks in February.

==== The fight ====
Judah would drop the challenger twice in the 1st round and once more in 3rd Round, after which referee Joe Cortez waved it off.

==== Aftermath ====
Speaking after bout Judah would call out Oscar De La Hoya and Antonio Margarito saying "I would love to fight De La Hoya, Margarito, everybody that knows me, I always ask for these guys. I have been calling these guys out for years now, it would be an honor for me to fight any of those guys. I'm going to show you I'm the best pound-for-pound fighter in the world."

Preceded by vs. Cory Spinks II	Zab Judah's bouts 14 May 2005	Succeeded by vs. Carlos Baldomir
Preceded by vs. Javier Hector Valadez	Cosme Rivera's bouts 14 May 2005	Succeeded by vs. Mario Ramos

=== Main Event ===
Trinidad's fighting style appeared to be out of rhythm in the first round, while Wright presented a defensive stance and relied on jabs. During the first three rounds Wright was in the offensive scoring with jabs. On the fourth round Trinidad connected a solid combination. In the sixth, Wright continued the strategy used in the previous rounds while Trinidad employed a strategy where he tried to neutralize his opponent's punches by standing in front of him. In the later rounds Trinidad tried to take the contest's offensive but his adversary managed to block most of his punches while continuing his previous tactic. In the twelfth round Trinidad pursued Wright while trying to score a knockout, but his opponent boxed away from him until the round ended.

Wright won the fight by unanimous decision, receiving scores of 120–107 and 119–108 twice by the judges.

== Aftermath ==
Speaking after the bout Wright said "I’ve had to keep proving myself over and over again, [Tonight] was a complete victory." Trinidad praised Wright saying "The fighter who beats me has to be one of the best in the world, And Wright is one of the best."

The day after the bout Trinidad announced his retirement from boxing at an emotional press conference at San Juan international airport.

The bout generated 510,000 pay-per-view buys and generated $25.5 million in pay-per-view revenue.

Following the bout, Oscar De La Hoya approached Wright with a $6 million offer, plus an additional $6 per pay-per-view buy above 600,000 homes. However, Wright declined the fight, "He offers everyone else $10, 15 million," Wright said, referring to the $10 million Trinidad received for fighting De La Hoya in 1999. "I ain't doing it." Wright also declined an offer to face Floyd Mayweather during that time, insisting on a 50-50 split, "Winky has everything to lose but nothing to gain," Wright's promoter Gary Shaw stated. "Mayweather has nothing to lose and everything to gain."

== Undercard ==
Confirmed bouts:

== Broadcasting ==
Country	Broadcaster
Australia	Main Event
Canada	Viewers Choice
United States	HBO

Preceded by vs. Ricardo Mayorga	Félix Trinidad's bouts 14 May 2005	Succeeded by vs. Roy Jones Jr.
Preceded by vs. Shane Mosley II	Winky Wright's bouts 14 May 2005	Succeeded by vs. Sam Soliman
