= Félix Trinidad vs. Ricardo Mayorga =

Boxing competition

Back with a Vengeance
- Date: October 2, 2004
- Venue: Madison Square Garden, New York City, New York, U.S.

Tale of the tape
Boxer	(Puerto Rico) Félix Trinidad	(Nicaragua) Ricardo Mayorga
Nickname	"Tito"	"El Matador"
Hometown	Fajardo, San Juan, Puerto Rico	Masaya, Masaya, Nicaragua
Purse	$10,000,000	$2,500,000
Pre-fight record	41–1 (34 KO)	26–4–1 (1) (22 KO)
Age	31 years, 8 months	30 years, 11 months
Height	5 ft 11 in (180 cm)	5 ft 10 in (178 cm)
Weight	157 3/4 lb (72 kg)	158 lb (72 kg)
Style	Orthodox	Orthodox
Recognition	3-division world champion	WBA; No. 1 Ranked Super Welterweight; WBO; No. 4 Ranked Super Welterweight; WBC/IBF; No. 5 Ranked Super Welterweight

Result
- Trinidad defeated Mayorga via 8th round TKO

Félix Trinidad vs. Ricardo Mayorga, billed as Back with a Vengeance, was a professional boxing match contested on October 2, 2004. It pitting together former world champions Felix Tito Trinidad and Ricardo Mayorga, under the promotion of Don King, at the Madison Square Garden in New York City, United States.

== Background ==
The fight involved no world titles, but that did not prevent it from being a large boxing event: With Bernard Hopkins's knockout of Oscar De La Hoya and Roy Jones Jr.'s knockout defeat weeks before, there were no more immediate big fights in the future, and both boxers had impressive knockout records.

The behind the scenes storylines involving this fight helped build up fan interest too: Mayorga, nicknamed "El Matador" ("The Killer"), had been active for the two previous years, settling for a no contest and a knockout win (in a rematch) against Andrew Lewis, then defeating Vernon Forrest twice before losing to Cory Spinks, all in world title fights. He had also won one fight at the Middleweight division.

During the weigh-in the day before the fight, Mayorga, feeling taunted by Trinidad's fans, responded by grabbing his genitals towards those fans. For the Trinidad fight, Mayorga dyed his hair red. Asked why he did that, he answered that he dyed his hair just because he felt like it.

Trinidad, for his part, had not been active for two years. He lost his motivation, according to him, after Hopkins refused to give him a rematch of their September 28, 2001 bout, in which Hopkins unified the WBA, WBC, and IBF titles by knocking Trinidad out in twelve rounds. After a win against Hacine Cherifi in four rounds in 2002, Trinidad retired. Trinidad reportedly reached a weight of 200 pounds (91 kg) during his retirement.

Because of those circumstances, many experts predicted that this fight would be like the fight between Joe Louis and Rocky Marciano or the one between Larry Holmes and Muhammad Ali: A former great who had been out of the ring for a considerable amount of time taking on an opponent who was, on the other hand, very good, but not to be considered as good as the retired champion ever was, therefore, many predicted Trinidad's doom at the hands of a man like Mayorga, who had won a world title and proven himself against some of the best boxers available while Trinidad was away from boxing.

The fight was telecast on HBO's Pay Per View, and commented by Jim Lampley, Larry Merchant and Roy Jones Jr. The fact it was held in New York guaranteed that many fans from both countries, especially Puerto Ricans, would come to cheer for their boxer.

== The fight ==
Mayorga started the fight by almost falling Trinidad with a jab. A famous part of this round sees Mayorga drop his hands sticking his chin in the air daring the vicious puncher Trinidad to try his best. Trinidad threw three left hooks and Mayorga simply did a mocking dance to taunt Trinidad. In round two, Trinidad and Mayorga traded power punches evenly, with most experts agreeing that Trinidad landed with a little more power.

Mayorga struck in round three with a right to the chin, that caused Trinidad to reel back and touch his glove to the mat. Although this was ruled a knockdown, Trinidad recuperated quickly, and went back into trading with Mayorga. By the end of the round, Mayorga was wobbled again. It has been alleged that, at some point after falling, Trinidad told Mayorga something in Spanish that sounded like "I've tasted your power now. Let's see if you can take mine(power)!".

By round four, Mayorga began to spurt a cut. Trinidad started to move to take advantage of the cut. Nevertheless, the round featured many furious exchanges between the two rivals.

Round five was similar to round four. Both fighters stood in the center of the ring, trading power punches until the bell. This style set the pattern for the rest of the fight, but Mayorga was noticeably tiring after six rounds, and he had sustained two more injuries.

The end of the fight came in round eight. Trinidad, seizing an opportunity for a knockout, dropped Mayorga three times, forcing the referee to stop the bout, giving Trinidad the TKO win.

== Aftermath ==
There was the possibility of a rematch between Trinidad and de la Hoya, who was defeated by Trinidad in 1999 via a controversial decision. A fight against Hopkins, based on the outcome of Hopkins-de la Hoya, was also very considered, just like a fight with Roy Jones Jr. Soon after the fight with Mayorga, though, Trinidad only fought Winky Wright in May 2005, losing in 12 rounds for only the second loss of his career. Eventually, Trinidad would fight Jones Jr. in January 2008, losing by unanimous 12-round decision.

As for Mayorga, he required hospitalization due to the injuries he sustained. Immediately after being released from the hospital (three days after the fight), he flew back to Nicaragua, where he would immediately begin a law process to determine whether he was guilty or not of rape. On October 5, he announced his retirement from boxing, although he later returned onto the ring to fight Michele Piccirillo and then Oscar De La Hoya.

The fight between Trinidad and Mayorga went on to be considered by some respected critics as a candidate for 2004's "fight of the year" immediately after it was over.

Promoter Don King went on a tirade against HBO days after the fight, complaining that HBO had dedicated 6 months to promote the Hopkins-de la Hoya fight and only six days to promote the Trinidad-Mayorga showdown. HBO executives replied by saying that King was apparently too caught up with the political debates of 2004, and that HBO and King have enjoyed a mutual working relationship for many years.

== Undercard ==
Confirmed bouts:

Winner	Loser	Weight division/title belt(s) disputed	Result
(United States) Zab Judah	(United States) Wayne Martell	WBO Inter-Continental Welterweight	1st-round TKO
(United States) Travis Simms	(United States) Bronco McKart	WBA (Regular) Light middleweight title	Unanimous decision
Non-TV bouts
(Nicaragua) Rosendo Álvarez	(Colombia) Beibis Mendoza	WBA World Light flyweight title*	Split decision
(United States) Luis Collazo	(Puerto Rico) Felix Flores	Light middleweight (10 rounds)	Unanimous decision
(United States) Danny Santiago	(Albania) Elvir Muriqi	Cruiserweight (10 rounds)	4th-round TKO
(United States) Steve Cunningham	(United States) Forrest Neal	Cruiserweight (8 rounds)	4th-round TKO
(Dominican Republic) Elio Rojas	(United States) Corey Goodwin	Super featherweight (6 rounds)	2nd-round TKO
(Croatia) Mario Preskar	(United States) Danny Wayland	Heavyweight (4 rounds)	1st-round KO
(United States) Vaughn Alexander	(United States) Michael Melvin	Light middleweight (4 rounds)	Unanimous decision

- The title was on the line for Mendoza only after Álvarez failed to make weight.

== Broadcasting ==
Country	Broadcaster
Australia	Main Event
Mexico	Televisa
Philippines	Solar Sports / RPN 9
United Kingdom	Sky Sports
United States	HBO

Preceded by vs. Hacine Cherifi	Félix Trinidad's bouts 2 October 2004	Succeeded by vs. Winky Wright
Preceded by vs. Eric Mitchell	Ricardo Mayorga's bouts 2 October 2004	Succeeded by vs. Michele Piccirillo
