= Night of the Undisputed =

Boxing event

Night of the Undisputed: Bernard Hopkins vs. William Joppy
- Date: December 13, 2003
- Venue: Boardwalk Hall, Atlantic City, New Jersey
- Titles on the line: WBA, WBC, IBF, and The Ring undisputed middleweight championship

Tale of the tape
Boxer	(United States) Bernard Hopkins	(United States) William Joppy
Nickname	"The Executioner"	
Hometown	Philadelphia, Pennsylvania	Silver Spring, Maryland
Purse	$350,000	$150,000
Pre-fight record	42–2–1 (1) (31 KO)	34–2–1 (25 KO)
Age	38 years, 10 months	33 years, 3 months
Height	6 ft 1 in (185 cm)	5 ft 9 in (175 cm)
Weight	160 lb (73 kg)	159 lb (72 kg)
Style	Orthodox	Orthodox
Recognition	WBA (Unified), WBC, IBF and The Ring; Undisputed Middleweight Champion; The Ring No. 2 ranked pound-for-pound fighter	WBA (Regular); Middleweight Champion; The Ring; No. 1 Ranked Middleweight

Result
- Hopkins defeated Joppy via Unanimous Decision

The Night of the Undisputed, was the billing of a professional boxing event, contested on December 13, 2003.

== Background ==
Promoted by veteran promoter Don King, the pay-per-view section of the bill was to feature five world title bout (two of which for undisputed championships), with eight championship bouts in total. It drew comparisons to the Revenge: The Rematches card in 1994. Bob Goodman, the veteran V.P. of boxing operations and matchmaker for Don King Productions claimed it broke the record for the most world championship bout on a single card saying "This is history. The most world championships ever on a card were six and that was Don's record. He's breaking his own record."

Actor Denzel Washington was one of the 12,000 people who attended the event.

== The fights ==
=== Undercard ===
The first of the televised bouts saw Zab Judah easily defend his Light welterweight title against Jaime Rangel, before Alejandro Garcia lost his Light middleweight belt to Travis Simms.

=== Rahman vs Ruiz ===
Night of the Undisputed: Hasim Rahman vs. John Ruiz
- Title on the line: WBA Interim Heavyweight Championship

Tale of the tape
Boxer	(United States) Hasim Rahman	(United States) John Ruiz
Nickname	"The Rock"	"The Quietman"
Hometown	Baltimore, Maryland	Chelsea, Massachusetts
Pre-fight record	35–4–1 (29 KO)	38–5–1 (27 KO)
Age	31 years, 1 month	31 years, 11 months
Height	6 ft 2 in (188 cm)	6 ft 1 in (185 cm)
Weight	246 lb (112 kg)	241 lb (109 kg)
Style	Orthodox	Orthodox
Recognition	WBA; No. 1 Ranked Heavyweight; The Ring; No. 8 Ranked Heavyweight	WBA; No. 4 Ranked Heavyweight

Result
- Ruiz defeated Rahman via Unanimous Decision

After WBA Heavyweight champion Roy Jones Jr., opted to return to the Light Heavyweight division to face Antonio Tarver, the WBA confirmed that he had until 20 February 2004 to decide to either defend the title or be stripped. In the meantime WBA ordered a bout for an "Interim" title, between their top ranked contenders David Tua and Hasim Rahman, who had fought to a somewhat controversial draw in March, after the previously top ranked Vitali Klitschko opted to face WBC champion Lennox Lewis in June. However after Tua's estranged management team took him to the High Court, King brought in John Ruiz to replace him.

This was Rahman's first bout with new trainer Roger Mayweather. Most expected Rahman to win.

==== The fight ====
Ruiz staggered Rahman with a hard right hand midway though the second round. Rahman spend much of the eighth round kept against the ropes by Ruiz's combinations. There was boos from the crowd during the non-eventful championship rounds. Ruiz won a Unanimous Decision with the cards reading 118–110, 116–112 and 115–114. Speaking after the bout Ruiz would say "I can't always look good. Some fights are gruelling. I need an easier fight to look pretty."

Preceded by vs. David Tua	Hasim Rahman's bouts 13 December 2003	Succeeded by vs. Al Cole
Preceded by vs. Roy Jones Jr.	John Ruiz's bouts 13 December 2003	Succeeded by vs. Fres Oquendo

=== Mayorga vs Spinks ===
Night of the Undisputed: Ricardo Mayorga vs. Cory Spinks
- Titles on the line: WBA, WBC, IBF, and The Ring undisputed welterweight championship

Tale of the tape
Boxer	(Nicaragua) Ricardo Mayorga	(United States) Cory Spinks
Nickname	"El Matador"	"The Next Generation"
Hometown	Masaya, Masaya, Nicaragua	St. Louis, Missouri, US
Pre-fight record	25–3–1 (1) (22 KO)	31–2 (11 KO)
Age	30 years, 2 months	25 years, 9 months
Height	5 ft 10 in (178 cm)	5 ft 9 1/2 in (177 cm)
Weight	146 lb (66 kg)	146 lb (66 kg)
Style	Orthodox	Southpaw
Recognition	WBA, WBC and The Ring; Welterweight Champion; The Ring No. 8 ranked pound-for-pound fighter	IBF; Welterweight Champion; The Ring; No. 3 Ranked Welterweight

Result
- Spinks defeated Mayorga via Majority Decision

The penultimate bout would see the first Undisputed welterweight champion since Lloyd Honeyghan dumped his WBA belt in 1987. There were talks of Mayorga facing unified light middleweight champion Shane Mosley should he beat Spinks.

Mayorga was the comfortable favourite entering the ring.

==== The fight ====
Mayorga lost 2 points during the bout, one in the 5th for hitting after the bell, and another in the 11th for hitting behind the head. After 12 rounds, one judge scored it 114–114, the other two had 114–112 and 117–110 both in favour of Spinks, giving him a Majority Decision victory. Spinks joined his father Leon and uncle Michael as an undisputed champion. Had Mayorga not lost those two points, the fight would have been a draw (tie) with scores of 116-114 for Mayorga, 114-114 and 117-112 for Spinks instead.

Preceded by vs. Vernon Forrest II	Ricardo Mayorga's bouts 13 December 2003	Succeeded by vs. Eric Mitchell
Preceded by vs. Michele Piccirillo	Cory Spinks's bouts 13 December 2003	Succeeded by vs. Zab Judah

=== Hopkins vs Joppy ===
In the final bout, Undisputed middleweight champion Bernard Hopkins faced former two time middleweight champion William Joppy. During a pre-fight press conference, Hopkins bet Joppy $50,000 that he would knock him out.

==== The fight ====
Joppy was unable to out-box Hopkins who dominated the bout. Joppy's left cheek face was bruised in the 3rd round, by the 10th, a welt had grown on his right temple. At the final bell, his face was heavily swollen. Hopkins won a lopsided Unanimous Decision with scores of 119–109, 118–109 & 119–108.

Preceded by vs. Morrade Hakkar	Bernard Hopkins's bouts 13 December 2003	Succeeded by vs. Robert Allen III
Preceded by vs. Naotaka Hozumi	William Joppy's bouts 13 December 2003	Succeeded by vs. Jermain Taylor

== Aftermath ==
On 24 February 2004 Roy Jones Jr. confirmed his full time return to Light heavyweight, prompting the WBA to elevate John Ruiz to their champion, making him a two time Heavyweight champion of world.

== Undercard ==
Confirmed bouts:

Winner	Loser	Weight division/title belt(s) disputed	Result
(United States) Cory Spinks	(Nicaragua) Ricardo Mayorga	Undisputed Welterweight Championship	Majority decision.
(United States) John Ruiz	(United States) Hasim Rahman	WBA Interim Heavyweight Championship	Unanimous decision.
(United States) Travis Simms	(Mexico) Alejandro Garcia	WBA (Regular) Super Welterweight Championship	5th-round KO.
(United States) Zab Judah	(Colombia) Jaime Rangel	WBO Light Welterweight Championship	1st-round KO.
Non-TV bouts
(Nicaragua) Rosendo Álvarez	(Mexico) Víctor Burgos	WBA/IBF Light Flyweight Championship	Split Draw.
(Guyana) Wayne Braithwaite	(Panama) Luis Andres Pineda	WBC Cruiserweight Championship	1st-round KO.
(Nicaragua) Luis Alberto Pérez	(Venezuela) Felix Machado	IBF Super Flyweight Championship	Unanimous decision.

== Broadcasting ==
Country	Broadcaster
Canada	Viewers Choice
United Kingdom	Sky Sports
United States	HBO
