= Antonio Davis (boxer) =

American boxer (born 1972)

Personal information
- Nickname: T-Rex
- Nationality: American
- Born: Antonio Larell Davis; July 31, 1972 (age 54) Chester, South Carolina, U.S.
- Height: 5 ft 8 in (1.73 m)
- Weight: Lightweight; Super Featherweight; Featherweight

Boxing career
- Reach: 71 in (182 cm)
- Stance: Southpaw

Boxing record
- Total fights: 22
- Wins: 18
- Win by KO: 11
- Losses: 3
- Draws: 1
- No contests: 0

Antonio Larell Davis (born July 31, 1972) is a professional boxer in the Lightweight division. He's the former WBO NABO Featherweight and IBA Super Featherweight champion.

== Pro career ==
In August 2007, Antonio upset the undefeated Leon Bobo to win the WBO NABO Featherweight championship.

=== WBC Super Featherweight Championship ===
On March 28, 2009, Davis was knocked out by WBC Super Featherweight champion Humberto Soto at the Plaza de Toros, Tijuana, Baja California, Mexico.
