= Wladimir Klitschko vs. Lamon Brewster =

Boxing event

- Date: April 10, 2004
- Venue: Mandalay Bay Events Center, Las Vegas, Nevada, U.S.
- Title on the line: WBO Heavyweight Championship

Tale of the tape
Boxer	(Ukraine) Wladimir Klitschko	(United States) Lamon Brewster
Nickname	"Dr Steelhammer"	"Relentless"
Hometown	Kyiv, Kyiv Oblast, Ukraine	Los Angeles, California, U.S.
Pre-fight record	42–2 (38 KO)	29–2 (26 KO)
Age	28 years	30 years, 10 months
Height	6 ft 6 in (198 cm)	6 ft 2 in (188 cm)
Weight	242 1/2 lb (110 kg)	226 lb (103 kg)
Style	Orthodox	Orthodox
Recognition	WBO; No. 1 Ranked Heavyweight; The Ring; No. 8 Ranked Heavyweight	WBO; No. 2 Ranked Heavyweight

Result
- Brewster defeated Klitschko via fifth-round TKO

Wladimir Klitschko vs. Lamon Brewster was a professional boxing match contested on April 10 2004, at the Mandalay Bay Resort & Casino in Las Vegas, Nevada, for the WBO Heavyweight Championship.

== Background ==
After his shock knockout defeat at the hands of Corrie Sanders, Klitschko first brought in new trainer Freddie Roach to assist lead trainer Fritz Sdunek for his quick knockouts of Fabio Eduardo Moli and Danell Nicholson. Following these fights Roach left the Klitschko camp to make way for new lead trainer Emanuel Steward who had become available after the retirement of WBC & Lineal champion Lennox Lewis.

Brewster was on a five-fight win streak (all by TKO) since his 2000 defeats against Clifford Etienne & Charles Shufford, he was previously set to challenge newly crowned WBO title holder Corrie Sanders, who declined the fight in favour of a bout with Vitali Klitschko for the vacant WBC belt. He was then set to face David Tua for the vacant belt in February 2004 before Tua unexpectedly pulled out. In the midst of this, in October 2003, his veteran trainer Bill Slayton died at the age of 81.

After a press conference before the fight Brewster was seen in tears after talking about Slayton's death, in sullen anger punching the microphone off its mount and on to the floor, leading to comparisons with Buster Douglas, whose mother died in the build-up to his title bout with Mike Tyson.

== The fights ==
=== Spinks vs. Judah ===
Cory Spinks vs. Zab Judah
- Titles on the line: WBA, WBC, IBF, and The Ring undisputed welterweight championship

Tale of the tape
Boxer	(United States) Cory Spinks	(United States) Zab Judah
Nickname	"The Next Generation"	"Super"
Hometown	St. Louis, Missouri	Brownsville, Brooklyn, New York
Pre-fight record	32–2 (11 KO)	30–1 (1) (22 KO)
Age	26 years, 1 month	26 years, 5 months
Height	5 ft 9 1/2 in (177 cm)	5 ft 7 in (170 cm)
Weight	147 lb (67 kg)	146 lb (66 kg)
Style	Southpaw	Southpaw
Recognition	WBA, WBC, IBF and The Ring; Undisputed Welterweight Champion	WBO; Junior Welterweight Champion; The Ring; No. 2 Ranked Light Welterweight

Result
- Spinks defeated Judah via Unanimous Decision

Just before the main event Cory Spinks defended his Undisputed welterweight championship against WBO Light welterweight titleholder Zab Judah.

Spinks was a slight underdog entering the bout.

==== The fight ====
Spinks would control much of the fight with his jab and would generally land the harder punches throughout. Judah would have trouble getting inside and throw a lot of wild punches.

A left hand from Spinks would drop Judah in the 11th round, he would beat the count and not appear hurt.

Before the start of the final round Spinks' trainer Kevin Cunningham told the champion to "Don't get reckless", believing that they led clearly on the cards. With less than 30 seconds to go Judah would land a left hand to the head of Spinks that send him down. Spinks beat the count and was able to survive to the final bell.

After a competitive bout Spinks was awarded a Unanimous Decision with scores of 116–111, 114–112 & 114–112. The Associated Press had Spinks winning 115-111.

==== Aftermath ====
Speaking after the bout Spinks would admit that he got "a little relaxed and careless, He hit me with a good shot." but was nevertheless he was pleased that he was able to show another part of ability "I tried to tell everybody I was more than just a boxer, I can get mean too."

Judah would admit he started too slowly saying "I think I could have done more, especially in the early rounds. But I think I did enough." He also admitted he should have tried harder to stop Spinks after the late knockdown "I should not have stopped after I knocked him down, I have no complaints. I felt I did O.K."

The two would have a rematch in February 2005.

Preceded by vs. Ricardo Mayorga	Cory Spinks's bouts 10 April 2004	Succeeded by vs. Miguel Ángel González
Preceded by vs. Jaime Rangel	Zab Judah's bouts 10 April 2004	Succeeded by vs. Rafael Pineda

=== Main Event ===
The first four rounds were dominated by Klitschko, who knocked Brewster down in the fourth with a right hand and appeared to be close to stopping the American but he made it through the round.

In the fifth round Klitschko appeared somewhat fatigued and, with less than a minute left in the round, Brewster caught him with a pair of left hooks that sent him into ropes which referee Robert Byrd ruled a knockdown. Brewster then dominated the remainder of the round before Klitschko hit the canvas shortly after the bell had sounded to end the round. After making it back to his feet Klitschko attempted to return to his corner but Byrd waved the fight off, giving Brewster a TKO victory and the WBO belt.

Throughout the fight, Klitschko landed 39% of his punches, while Brewster landed just 27%.

== Aftermath ==
Shortly after the fight Klitschko was rushed into hospital. An examination showed Klitschko's blood sugar level almost two times higher than the permissible norm. According to members of Klitschko's team, the doctor told them that Klitschko had been "inches away" from falling into diabetic coma, and that with blood sugar level that high, Klitschko would've been incapable of handling a single proper training session. After returning from the examination to the hotel, he fell ill with nausea, followed by physical weakness. On 12 April, he arrived in Las Vegas and provided blood and urine samples for an independent examination, which was supposed to be done by Donald Katlin, who specialized in such cases. The examination showed no signs of anabolic steroids in his blood, but Katlin suggested that Klitschko could have been poisoned with Haloperidol. The drug has no taste or smell and causes mental disorders, which are accompanied by impaired coordination, a weakening reaction and overall physical weakness. Following the results, Klitschko demanded the tests taken by the Medical Center of South Nevada and the Nevada Quest Diagnostics to be passed on to Dr. Robert Wow for further research, but the A sample had already been disposed of, while the B sample, which was supposed to be stored for years, disappeared. Dr. Margaret Goodman, the chairwoman of the Nevada State Athletic Commission's medical advisory board and Nevada's chief ringside physician, was in the ring and attending to Klitschko seconds after the referee stopped the fight. Her initial diagnosis of a Grade 3 concussion was confirmed at the hospital after further tests. Goodman was skeptical of the theory that Klitschko had been drugged.

As a result of the circumstances that surrounded the fight, FBI started an investigation. Judd Bernstein, the lawyer representing Klitschko, suggested that he was a victim of an ongoing fight fixing in Las Vegas (which also included fraudulent medical reports), which was investigated by FBI at the time. Bernstein, along with some other journalists, pointed out that in the last 48 hours before the beginning of the fight, the betting odds in favor of Klitschko rapidly dropped from 11-to-1 to 3.5-to-1. According to journalist Keith Teixeira, a group of approximately 40 people associated with Brewster's manager Sam Simon bet from $50,000 to $100,000 on Brewster's victory. Members of Klitschko's team also pointed out that shortly before the fight, a security camera recorded a moment when two people entered Klitschko's booth and were there for four minutes. These people had badges, but weren't members of Wladimir's team. Wladimir's brother Vitali claimed that during registration of the boxer and his team, the card that belonged to Emmanuel Steward's assistant had already been registered on someone else, and that such card would allow its owner to enter any sporting hall in the building.

After the fight, Wladimir's cutman Joe Souza was fired. During the fight, Souza used vaseline on Wladimir's face but also body, which had never been done in any of Klitschko's previous fights. As a replacement, the team hired Jacob "Stitch" Duran.

Brewster made his first defence five months later against Kali Meehan.

The two boxers fought a rematch in 2007 with Brewster's corner asking the fight to be stopped at the end of the sixth round, and throughout the rest of his long career Klitschko used this loss as a driving force, saying in an interview with ESPN's Dan Rafael: "I will be thankful to Lamon until my grave. It's something that changed my life. I'm not sure what I would have become had I won. That fight changed my life for the good."

== Undercard ==
Confirmed bouts:

== Broadcasting ==
Country	Broadcaster
Germany	ZDF
Hungary	RTL Klub
United States	HBO

Preceded by vs. Danell Nicholson	Wladimir Klitschko' bouts 10 April 2004	Succeeded by vs. DaVarryl Williamson
Preceded by vs. Joe Lenhart	Lamon Brewster's bouts 10 April 2004	Succeeded by vs. Kali Meehan
