= Roman Karmazin =

Russian boxer (born 1973)

Personal information
- Nickname: Made in Hell
- Nationality: Russian
- Born: Roman Alexandrovich Karmazin; January 2, 1973 Kuznetsk, Russia
- Height: 5 ft 11 1/2 in (182 cm)
- Weight: Light middleweight; Middleweight

Boxing career
- Reach: 72 in (183 cm)
- Stance: Orthodox

Boxing record
- Total fights: 48
- Wins: 40
- Win by KO: 26
- Losses: 5
- Draws: 2
- No contests: 1

Roman Alexandrovich Karmazin (born January 2, 1973) is a Russian former professional boxer. He held the IBF Light Middleweight title.

== Professional career ==
Karmazin suffered his first loss in 2002, a twelve-round decision against Javier Castillejo of Spain in Castiliejo's hometown. His only draw came early in his career in an eight-round fight against Javier Martinez in Avilés, Spain. Karmazin also has a no-contest against former title contender Jason Papillion. The 2004 bout was halted when Papillion was cut by an accidental headbutt in the fourth round.

In 2004, Karmazin outworked Keith Holmes to a majority decision in an IBF title eliminator.

A consistent puncher, Karmazin won the IBF Light Middleweight championship through steady work that led to a lopsided unanimous decision over Kassim Ouma. On July 8, 2006, nearly a year after his last fight, Karmazin lost his title to Cory Spinks.

Karmazin's corner includes world-class trainer Freddie Roach.

== Professional boxing record ==
48 fights	40 wins	5 losses
By knockout	26	3
By decision	14	2
Draws	2	
No contests	1	

No.	Result	Record	Opponent	Type	Round, time	Date	Location	Notes
48	Loss	40–5–2 (1)	Osumanu Adama	TKO	9 (12), 0:58	Oct 7, 2011	The Club Chicago, Burbank, Illinois, US	
47	Loss	40–4–2 (1)	Daniel Geale	TKO	12 (12), 2:30	Oct 31, 2010	Olympic Park Sports Centre, Homebush, Australia	
46	Draw	40–3–2 (1)	Sebastian Sylvester	SD	12	Jun 5, 2010	Jahnsportforum, Neubrandenburg, Germany	For IBF middleweight title
45	Win	40–3–1 (1)	Dionisio Miranda	KO	10 (12), 2:34	Jan 8, 2010	Civic Auditorium, Glendale, California, US	
44	Win	39–3–1 (1)	Luiz Augusto Dos Santos	TKO	4 (10), 2:08	May 9, 2009	Stadium Khadjimukan, Shymkent, Kazakhstan	
43	Win	38–3–1 (1)	Antwun Echols	TKO	7 (10), 1:52	Mar 21, 2009	Playboy Mansion, Beverly Hills, California, US	Retained NABF middleweight title
42	Win	37–3–1 (1)	Bronco McKart	UD	12	Dec 20, 2008	Hollywood Park Casino, Inglewood, California, US	Won vacant NABF middleweight title
41	Loss	36–3–1 (1)	Alex Bunema	TKO	10 (12), 1:36	Jan 19, 2008	Madison Square Garden, New York City, New York, US	Lost WBA Inter-Continental light middleweight title
40	Win	36–2–1 (1)	Alejandro García	KO	3 (12), 1:24	Nov 23, 2007	Staples Center, Los Angeles, California, US	Won vacant WBA Inter-Continental light middleweight title
39	Win	35–2–1 (1)	James Obede Toney	TKO	4 (10), 2:05	Jan 6, 2007	Seminole Hard Rock Hotel and Casino, Hollywood, California, US	
38	Loss	34–2–1 (1)	Cory Spinks	MD	12	Jul 8, 2006	Savvis Center, Saint Louis, Missouri, US	Lost IBF light middleweight title
37	Win	34–1–1 (1)	Kassim Ouma	UD	12	Jul 14, 2005	Orleans Hotel & Casino, Las Vegas, Nevada, US	Won IBF light middleweight title
36	Win	33–1–1 (1)	Keith Holmes	MD	12	Apr 2, 2005	DCU Center, Worcester, Massachusetts, US	
35	ND	32–1–1 (1)	Jason Papillion	ND	4 (8), 2:46	15 May 2004	Mandalay Bay Resort & Casino, Las Vegas, Nevada, US	
34	Win	32–1–1	David Walker	TKO	3 (12), 2:07	Oct 4, 2003	Alexandra Palace, Wood Green, London, England	Retained EBU light middleweight title
33	Win	31–1–1	Michael Rask	KO	2 (12)	Jun 13, 2003	Aalborg Hallen, Aalborg, Denmark	Retained EBU light middleweight title
32	Win	30–1–1	Jorge Araujo	TKO	5 (12), 2:14	Feb 7, 2003	Plaza de Toros La Cubierta, Leganes, Spain	Won vacant EBU light middleweight title
31	Loss	29–1–1	Javier Castillejo	UD	12	Jul 12, 2002	Campo de Futbol Las Americas, Parla, Spain	For WBC interim light middleweight title
30	Win	29–0–1	Sergey Tatevosyan	UD	8	Apr 10, 2002	Giant Hall, Casino Conti, Saint Petersburg, Russia	
29	Win	28–0–1	Viktor Fesechko	PTS	6	Jul 21, 2001	Ponds Forge Arena, Sheffield, Yorkshire, England	
28	Win	27–0–1	Mike Algoet	PTS	8	Mar 10, 2001	York Hall, Bethnal Green, London, England	
27	Win	26–0–1	Orhan Delibaș	RTD	3 (12), 3:00	Jun 3, 2000	Europahalle, Karlsruhe, Germany	Won vacant EBU super welterweight title
26	Win	25–0–1	Nico Toriri	TKO	2 (8)	Mar 10, 2000	Yubileiny Sports Palace, Saint Petersburg, Russia	
25	Win	24–0–1	Anthony Fields	KO	2 (10)	Jan 29, 2000	Ballys Park Place Hotel Casino, Atlantic City, New Jersey, US	
24	Win	23–0–1	Simon Mokoena	UD	8	Dec 25, 1999	Stedelijke Sporthalle, Izegem, Belgium	
23	Win	22–0–1	Alejandro De Leon	TKO	5 (8)	Nov 1, 1999	Izegem, Belgium	
22	Win	21–0–1	Yuri Epifantsev	TKO	4 (8)	Oct 7, 1999	Tundra Bar, Saint Petersburg, Russia	
21	Win	20–0–1	Andrey Plekhanov	TKO	4 (8)	Sep 9, 1999	Tundra Bar, Saint Petersburg, Russia	
20	Win	19–0–1	Alexey Ustyantsev	TKO	2 (8)	Jun 10, 1999	Tundra Bar, Saint Petersburg, Russia	
19	Win	18–0–1	Juan Italo Meza	PTS	8	Mar 5, 1999	Bilbao, Spain	
18	Win	17–0–1	Hugo Sclarandi	UD	8	Dec 25, 1998	Izegem, Belgium	
17	Win	16–0–1	Bahre Ahmeti	TKO	4 (8)	Nov 1, 1998	Izegem, Belgium	
16	Win	15–0–1	Bahre Ahmeti	PTS	6	Oct 3, 1998	Prinz-Garden Halle, Augsburg, Germany	
15	Win	14–0–1	Robert Frazier	UD	8	Jun 9, 1998	Circus, Moscow, Russia	
14	Win	13–0–1	Jeff Johnson	TKO	2 (12)	Mar 14, 1998	Olimpiyskiy, Moscow, Russia	
13	Win	12–0–1	Jesus Gutierrez	TKO	12 (12)	Dec 13, 1997	Yubileiny Sports Palace, Saint Petersburg, Russia	
12	Win	11–0–1	Ruslan Konstandi	RTD	4 (8), 3:00	Oct 17, 1997	Yubileiny Sports Palace, Saint Petersburg, Russia	
11	Win	10–0–1	Teimuraz Kekelidze	UD	8	Jul 28, 1997	Circus, Moscow, Russia	
10	Win	9–0–1	Andrian Lukachev	KO	4 (6)	May 28, 1997	Giant Hall, Casino Conti, Saint Petersburg, Russia	
9	Win	8–0–1	Roman Babaev	UD	8	Apr 5, 1997	Yubileiny Sports Palace, Saint Petersburg, Russia	
8	Win	7–0–1	Jorge Reglero	TKO	1 (6)	Mar 18, 1997	Valencia, Spain	
7	Win	6–0–1	Juan Ramon Medina	PTS	8	Feb 14, 1997	Bilbao, Spain	
6	Win	5–0–1	Viktor Orlov	TKO	5 (6)	Feb 2, 1997	Sport Hall Energia, Narva, Estonia	
5	Draw	4–0–1	Javier Martinez	PTS	8	Dec 20, 1996	Aviles, Spain	
4	Win	4–0	Andrey Verpakhovskyy	TKO	3 (6)	Nov 25, 1996	Fakel, Saint Petersburg, Russia	
3	Win	3–0	Eduard Tsvetkov	TKO	1 (6)	Oct 20, 1996	Zlatoust, Russia	
2	Win	2–0	Vadim Solodov	TKO	3 (6)	Oct 11, 1996	Fakel, Saint Petersburg, Russia	
1	Win	1–0	Eduard Gavaza	TKO	2 (4)	Aug 17, 1996	Fakel, Saint Petersburg, Russia	

== See also ==
- List of world light-middleweight boxing champions

Sporting positions
Regional boxing titles
Vacant Title last held by Mamadou Thiam	EBU Super-welterweight champion 3 June 2000 – 2000; Vacated	Vacant Title next held by Mamadou Thiam
Vacant Title last held by Wayne Alexander	EBU Super-welterweight champion 7 February 2003 – 2004; Vacated	Vacant Title next held by Serhiy Dzyndzyruk
World boxing titles
Preceded by Kassim Ouma	IBF Light middleweight champion 14 July 2005 – 8 July 2006	Succeeded by Cory Spinks
