= Michele Piccirillo =

Italian boxer

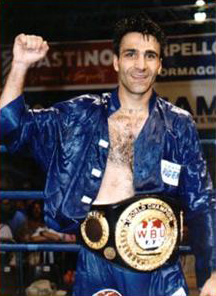
- Michele Piccirillo

Personal information
- Nickname: Gentleman
- Nationality: Italian
- Born: 29 January 1970 (age 56) Modugno, Italy
- Height: 5 ft 10 1/2 in (179 cm)
- Weight: Light welterweight; Welterweight; Light middleweight

Boxing career
- Reach: 71 1/2 in (182 cm)
- Stance: Orthodox

Boxing record
- Total fights: 56
- Wins: 50
- Win by KO: 29
- Losses: 5
- No contests: 1
Medal record
Men's Boxing
Representing Italy
European Amateur Championships
Bronze medal – third place	1991 Gothenburg	Light Welterweight

Michele Piccirillo (born 29 January 1970 in Modugno, Italy) is a professional boxer in the welterweight (147 lb [66.7 kg]) division.

== Amateur career ==
Michele Piccirillo was an Italian boxer who earned the nickname “Il Gentleman del Ring” for his elegant fighting style and sportsmanship. He started boxing under the guidance of his father and coach Scipione. As an amateur he fought 112 matches from 1986 to 1992, with 108 victories and 4 losses. The highlight of his amateur career came in 1991 when he won a bronze medal at the European Championship. He was eliminated in his first contest at the same year’s World Championship and also at the 1989 European Championships. Piccirillo turned professional after the Barcelona Games.

== Professional career ==
In his 11th pro contest in 1994 he won the Intercontinental Light-Welterweight title against the Mexican Manuel Hernández, then on 21 July 1995, he became Italian champion against Franco Palmiero. His first defeat came in April 1996, in Denmark, where he lost a bout for the European title against the Dane Soren Sondergaard. After a final defense of the Italian title, he moved up to welterweight. On 29 November 1997, he knocked out the Briton Geoff McCreesh, to win the European welterweight crown.

Piccirillo immediately abandoned the title to challenge for the WBU world title, an organization with minimal recognition around the world. He won this title on 4 May 1998, at Catania in Sicily, against his fellow Italian Alessandro Duran. After 8 successful defences, he relinquished the title to fight for the more prestigious IBF title, which he then won in April 2002 by decision over the American Cory Spinks, the son of Leon Spinks which USA Today newspaper described as one of the most controversial decisions in modern boxing history. He lost the title the following year in a rematch.

After this Piccirillo moved up in weight again, this time to light-middleweights. On 13 August 2005, in Chicago, he was defeated by Ricardo Mayorga (Nicaragua) in a match for the latter’s WBC world crown. He rebounded to win the vacant European light-middleweight title against Lukáš Konečný, then defended it twice against Luca Messi and Michael Jones. On 1 December 2007, at Foxwoods Casino in Mashantucket, Connecticut, he tried again to win the world title, but was knocked out in round 11 by the American Vernon Forrest. His pro record ended at 50 wins (29 by KO), 5 losses (2 by KO), 1 no contest. Piccirillo was awarded the Gold Medal of the Italian Olympic Committee for his athletic achievements.

== Professional boxing record ==
56 fights	50 wins	5 losses
By knockout	29	2
By decision	21	3
No contests	1	

No.	Result	Record	Opponent	Type	Round, time	Date	Location	Notes
56	Loss	50–5 (1)	Jamie Moore	KO	3 (12)	2009-03-06	Robin Park Arena, Wigan, U.K.	For vacant EBU light middleweight title
55	Win	50–4 (1)	János Petrovics	PTS	6 (6)	2008-07-18	Civitanova Marche, Italy	
54	Win	49–4 (1)	Patrik Hruska	PTS	6 (6)	2008-05-16	PalaRuffini, Torino, Italy	
53	Loss	48–4 (1)	Vernon Forrest	TKO	11 (12)	2007-12-01	Foxwoods Resort Casino, Ledyard, Connecticut, U.S.	For WBC light middleweight title
52	Win	48–3 (1)	Sylvain Touzet	PTS	6 (6)	2007-07-31	Centro Polivalente, San Genesio ed Uniti, Italy	
51	Win	47–3 (1)	Michael Jones	TKO	12 (12)	2007-01-25	PalaLido, Milan, Italy	Retained EBU light middleweight title
50	Win	46–3 (1)	Luca Messi	TKO	11 (12)	2006-07-27	Velodromo Vigorelli, Milan, Italy	Retained EBU light middleweight title
49	Win	45–3 (1)	Lukáš Konečný	UD	12 (12)	2006-03-10	Palasport, Bergamo, Italy	Won vacant EBU light middleweight title
48	Loss	44–3 (1)	Ricardo Mayorga	UD	12 (12)	2005-08-13	United Center, Chicago, U.S.	For vacant WBC light middleweight title
47	Win	44–2 (1)	Serge Vigne	MD	6 (6)	2004-11-13	PalaBrera, San Martino Siccomario, Italy	
46	Win	43–2 (1)	Lóránt Szabó	KO	1 (10)	2004-09-04	Mede, Italy	
45	Win	42–2 (1)	Stephane Talliana	TKO	3 (10)	2004-07-03	Modugno, Italy	
44	Win	41–2 (1)	Louis Mimoune	PTS	8 (8)	2004-03-27	PalaLottomatica, Roma, Italy	
43	Win	40–2 (1)	Paulo Alejandro Sanchez	UD	8 (8)	2003-12-09	PalaLido, Milan, Italy	
42	Win	39–2 (1)	Ruben Dario Oliva	KO	7 (8)	2003-07-27	Fasano, Italy	
41	Win	38–2 (1)	Oscar Daniel Veliz	RTD	6 (8)	2003-06-14	Modugno, Italy	
40	Loss	37–2 (1)	Cory Spinks	UD	12 (12)	2003-03-22	Casinò di Campione, Campione d'Italia, Italy	Lost IBF welterweight title
39	Win	37–1 (1)	Cory Spinks	UD	12 (12)	2002-04-13	Casinò di Campione, Campione d'Italia, Italy	Won vacant IBF welterweight title
38	Win	36–1 (1)	Rafael Pineda	UD	12 (12)	2001-09-29	Madison Square Garden, New York City, U.S.	
37	NC	35–1 (1)	Elio Ortiz	NC	4 (12)	2001-05-12	Madison Square Garden, New York City, U.S.	
36	Win	35–1	Stanley Mabesi	KO	3 (8)	2001-03-02	Caltanissetta, Italy	
35	Win	34–1	Andrew Murray	TKO	9 (12)	2000-08-05	Bari, Italy	Retained WBU welterweight title
34	Win	33–1	Walter Crucce	UD	12 (12)	2000-05-20	Piancavallo, Italy	Retained WBU welterweight title
33	Win	32–1	Frankie Randall	UD	12 (12)	1999-12-18	Padua, Italy	Retained WBU welterweight title
32	Win	31–1	Felix Victor Vasconcel	KO	2 (12)	1999-07-31	Catania, Italy	Retained WBU welterweight title
31	Win	30–1	Juan Martin Coggi	UD	12 (12)	1999-05-29	Bari, Italy	Retained WBU welterweight title
30	Win	29–1	Sergio Ernesto Acuna	UD	12 (12)	1999-03-13	Taranto, Italy	Retained WBU welterweight title
29	Win	28–1	Alessandro Duran	UD	12 (12)	1998-10-19	PalaLaforgia, Bari, Italy	Retained WBU welterweight title
28	Win	27–1	Walter Fabian Saporiti	TKO	7 (12)	1998-07-18	Marina di Ragusa, Italy	Retained WBU welterweight title
27	Win	26–1	Alessandro Duran	TKO	5 (12)	1998-05-04	PalaCatania, Catania, Italy	Won WBU welterweight title
26	Win	25–1	Geoff McCreesh	TKO	9 (12)	1997-11-29	Novara, Italy	Won vacant EBU welterweight title
25	Win	24–1	Claudiu Rata	TKO	4 (12)	1997-09-13	Brindisi, Italy	Won WBU Intercontinental welterweight title
24	Win	23–1	Milko Stoikov	TKO	2 (?)	1997-08-16	Campobello di Mazara, Italy	
23	Win	22–1	Stefan Dimitrov	TKO	3 (?)	1997-06-12	Chico-Mendez Park, Giulianova, Italy	
22	Win	21–1	Miguel Angel Pena	KO	2 (8)	1997-03-12	Altamura, Italy	
21	Win	20–1	Jorge Ramirez	UD	8 (8)	1996-12-18	Modugno, Italy	
20	Win	19–1	Farid Bennecer	PTS	8 (8)	1996-10-26	Palaflor Corso Garibaldi, San Remo, Italy	
19	Win	18–1	Francesco Cioffi	UD	12 (12)	1996-08-24	Favignana, Italy	Retained Italian light welterweight title
18	Loss	17–1	Søren Søndergaard	UD	12 (12)	1996-04-26	Aalborghallen, Aalborg, Denmark	For vacant EBU light welterweight title
17	Win	17–0	Noe Hernandez	TKO	4 (8)	1996-01-20	Palasport, Marsala, Italy	
16	Win	16–0	Alberto Alicea	TKO	4 (12)	1995-09-27	Circolo Citta di Roma, Petrosino, Italy	Retained IBF Inter-Continental light welterweight title
15	Win	15–0	Franco Palmiero	KO	3 (12)	1995-07-21	Latina, Lazio, Italy	Won vacant Italian light welterweight title
14	Win	14–0	Benito Martinez	KO	8 (12)	1995-03-24	Grosseto, Italy	Retained IBF Inter-Continental light welterweight title
13	Win	13–0	Viktor Baranov	UD	12 (12)	1994-12-17	PalaFlorio, Bari, Italy	Retained IBF Inter-Continental light welterweight title
12	Win	12–0	Ferenc Szakallas	RTD	3 (?)	1994-10-29	Arcidosso, Italy	
11	Win	11–0	Manuel Hernandez	KO	4 (12)	1994-06-18	Campiglia Marittima, Italy	Won IBF Inter-Continental light welterweight title
10	Win	10–0	Luigi La Grasta	TKO	5 (?)	1994-03-11	Ponte San Giovanni, Marche, Italy	
9	Win	9–0	Vadim Prisyazhnyuk	PTS	8 (8)	1993-12-04	Almaty, Kazakhstan	
8	Win	8–0	Eduardo Jaquez	UD	8 (8)	1993-09-24	Palasport, Roma, Italy	
7	Win	7–0	Gyorgy Kincses	KO	2 (6)	1993-08-20	Civitavecchia, Italy	
6	Win	6–0	Pave Turic	KO	2 (?)	1993-05-15	Bari, Italy	
5	Win	5–0	Victor Melendez	PTS	6 (6)	1993-04-16	PalaEur, Roma, Italy	
4	Win	4–0	Tahar Nasri	KO	1 (6)	1993-04-09	Gymnase Principiano, Le Cannet, France	
3	Win	3–0	Nelson Lakicevic	KO	2 (?)	1993-02-05	Bari, Italy	
2	Win	2–0	Csaba Olah	TKO	3 (6)	1993-01-13	Sanremo, Italy	
1	Win	1–0	Valery Monakhov	KO	6 (6)	1992-12-18	Ponte San Giovanni, Marche, Italy	

== See also ==
- List of world welterweight boxing champions

Sporting positions
Regional boxing titles
Vacant Title last held by Andrey Pestryayev	EBU welterweight champion 29 November 1997 – 1998; Vacated	Vacant Title next held by Maxim Nesterenko
Preceded by Serhiy Dzyndzyruk	EBU super welterweight champion 10 March 2006 – 2007; Vacated	Vacant Title next held by Zaurbek Baysangurov
Minor world boxing titles
Preceded by Alessandro Duran	WBU welterweight champion 4 May 1998 – 5 August 2000; Vacated	Vacant Title next held by Jan Piet Bergman
Major world boxing titles
Vacant Title last held by Vernon Forrest	IBF welterweight champion 13 April 2002 – 22 March 2003	Succeeded by Cory Spinks
