= Ricardo Mayorga =

Nicaraguan boxer (born 1973)

Personal information
- Nicknames: El Matador ("The Killer"); El Loco ("Crazy")
- Born: Ricardo Antonio Mayorga Perez; October 3, 1973 (age 53) Masaya, Nicaragua
- Height: 5 ft 10 in (178 cm)

Boxing career
- Weight class: Light welterweight; Welterweight; Light middleweight; Middleweight; Super middleweight
- Reach: 68 1/2 in (174 cm)

Boxing record
- Total fights: 46
- Wins: 32
- Win by KO: 26
- Losses: 12
- Draws: 1
- No contests: 1

Ricardo Antonio Mayorga Perez (born October 3, 1973) is a Nicaraguan former professional boxer and former mixed martial artist. In boxing he is a former two-weight world champion, having held the unified WBA (Unified), WBC, Ring magazine, and lineal welterweight titles in 2003, and the WBC super welterweight title from 2005 to 2006. Mayorga first became well known to boxing fans upon being featured on the cover of The Ring's December 2003 issue, entitled "The craziest man in the sport: Mayorga lights up boxing." He has since maintained this infamous reputation with his relentless trash-talk in the build-up to most of his fights, as well as his smoking and drinking habits outside the ring.

== Professional boxing career ==
=== Mayorga vs. Lewis ===
After defending the title against Larry Marks, Andrew Lewis took on Mayorga. The bout ended in the 2nd round and was ruled a No Contest due to a nasty cut on Lewis caused by accidental headbutt. Lewis's lost the title in a rematch to Mayorga in 2002 via 5th-round TKO.

=== Mayorga vs. Forrest I, II ===
In January 2003, Vernon Forrest (35–0–0) fought Mayorga. Mayorga was a mostly unknown fringe contender from Nicaragua and few gave him a chance to win against the significantly bigger and stronger Forrest. Mayorga shocked the world when he easily dominated Forrest, dropping him once in the 1st round and again in the 3rd round. The referee would call off the fight after the second knockdown, as Forrest was visibly dazed and unable to get his footing.

Forrest would rematch Mayorga six months later, losing again, this time by a majority decision. The bout was close and competitive, with Mayorga mostly chasing Forrest around the ring while Forrest was content to fight from the outside.

=== Mayorga vs. Spinks ===
Cory Spinks (31–2–0) rose to boxing stardom by unifying the WBC, WBA, IBF, and The Ring lineal welterweight titles on December 13, 2003, when he defeated Mayorga by majority decision. Spinks was a 5 to 1 underdog going into the fight with Mayorga. The judges scored the fight 114–112, 117–109, 114-114, favoring Spinks.

=== Mayorga vs. Trinidad ===
Félix Trinidad (41–1–0) announced a comeback on March 2, 2004. On October 2, 2004, he fought against Mayorga, in Madison Square Garden. Early in the 1st round Mayorga was on the offensive connecting several combinations, later in the round Trinidad connected some punches to his opponent's face. Mayorga reacted defiantly while lowering his defense, which Trinidad used to continue the offensive during the closing seconds. In the 2nd round, Trinidad continued connecting with combinations to Mayorga's face which caused him to bleed from his nose; the round concluded with both fighters exchanging punches. In the 3rd round, Mayorga attempted to counter with punches to the body but did not do significant damage to his opponent, however later in the round one of these punches made Trinidad lose his balance and touch the floor with one glove which the referee counted as a knockdown. In the 4th round, both boxers traded hard combinations. In the 5th round, Trinidad displayed control of the offense's tempo injuring Mayorga and opening a cut under one of his eyes. This pattern continued in the 6th and 7th round, and the cut on Mayorga's face began to swell. In the 8th round, Trinidad scored several knockdowns, Mayorga continued after two knockdowns, but lost by technical knockout following a third knockdown.

=== Mayorga vs. De La Hoya ===
Oscar De La Hoya (37–4-0) took a layoff of 20 months before signing to fight Mayorga. In the buildup to the fight, Mayorga insulted everything from De La Hoya's sexuality to his wife and child, but when they fought on May 6, 2006, De La Hoya knocked Mayorga down in the first minute of the fight with a left hook. De La Hoya knocked him out in the 6th round to take his tenth world title.

=== Mayorga vs. Vargas ===
It was confirmed on May 13, 2007, that Fernando Vargas (26–4–0) would face Mayorga on September 8, 2007, on Showtime PPV for the vacant WBC Continental Americas super middleweight title. However the fight was postponed after it was discovered during a routine blood test that Vargas was suffering from a severe iron deficiency. Doctors ordered Vargas not to participate in the upcoming bout until he received the necessary weeks of treatment to correct the problem. When the bout eventually took place it would be fought at 162 pounds, a weight that neither boxer has ever fought at. Many sources claim that Vargas had complained about fighting at the Jr. Middleweight limit of 154 pounds, stating that it's "too much for his body to take". Vargas has stated that fighting at that weight was the reason he did poorly against Mosley in the second fight.

Vargas claimed that this would be the last fight of his career regardless of the result. He warned Mayorga that he would not tolerate any insults from him like the ones he hurled at De La Hoya in their press conferences. Vargas stayed true to his promise when at the first official press conference for the fight, Mayorga said some offensive things towards Vargas and attempted to slap him. Vargas immediately jumped up from his seat and retaliated with punches and a brawl broke out between the two fighters' camps, though order was quickly restored. Vargas also recalled the time when Mayorga said Vargas was scared of him when he had defeated Javier Castillejo, then was stripped of his WBC light middleweight title rather than face Mayorga, who then defeated Michele Piccirillo for the vacant title. Ultimately the contestants faced off, and Mayorga defeated Vargas by majority decision on November 23, 2007. The scores were 113-113, 114–112, and 115–111. Crucially, Vargas was knocked down in the 1st round and again in the 11th round. Post-fight Mayorga apologized to Vargas and the two forgave each other. Vargas officially declared his retirement soon after.

=== Mayorga vs. Mosley ===
In August 2008, it was announced that Shane Mosley (44–5-0) would fight at light middleweight against Mayorga. The fight was to take place at Home Depot Center in California on September 27, 2008. The first time since 2000 that Mosley would fight in his home state. The fight was for the vacant WBA Inter-Continental light middleweight title. Mosley was guaranteed $1 million. During the first three rounds of the bout, the harder puncher appeared to be Mayorga, who landed right hands from long range. Mayorga's roughhousing mixed with his usual showboating antics seemed to bother Mosley, who appeared more uncomfortable and agitated. In recklessly lunging in with wild power shots of his own, Mosley wound up falling into more clinches and getting caught with punches he should have avoided. Mosley settled down and found the distance in the 4th round and took the next three rounds by timing Mayorga with overhand rights that landed and occasionally following up with short hooks and single body shots. Mosley continued with right hands in the seventh and eighth rounds. Mosley was able to land single power shots in the late rounds, but threw very few combinations. At times Mayorga beat Mosley to the punch with lead right hands. Near the end of the eleventh round, Mosley landed a right hand that splattered blood from Mayorga's mouth. With less than a minute left in the bout, put Mayorga down on his hands and knees. Mayorga got up on unsteady legs; Mosley stepped in with a short, lead left hook that put Mayorga flat on his back at the bell, resulting in the referee waving the bout off. At the time of stoppage, two judges had Mosley ahead with scored of 107-102 and 105–104, whilst the third judge had Mayorga ahead 105–104. Had the fight gone to scorecards, Mosley would have won via unanimous decision due to the last round being a 10–7.

=== Mayorga vs. Cotto ===
On January 19, 2011, in a press conference at Times Square, New York, Bob Arum and Don King, working together for the first time in five years, officially announced that Miguel Cotto (35–2–0) would defend his WBA light middleweight title against Mayorga at the MGM Grand Garden Arena in Las Vegas, Nevada on March 12, 2011, live on Showtime PPV. In front of 7,247 at the MGM, Cotto defeated Mayorga via TKO in the 12th round, retaining his WBA light middleweight title. Throughout the fight, Mayorga looked to engage, however the discipline on Cotto played a big part in the win, saving his big shots for the final round. A left hook, which dropped Mayorga, ended the bout. At the time of stoppage, Cotto was ahead by five points on all three judges' scorecards. With the win, Cotto's record for world title fights improved to (17–2). Cotto earned $1 million from the fight and compubox stats showed that Cotto out punched Mayorga 249 to 176 in total punches. In the post-fight, Cotto explained how he won the fight, "The game plan was not to get caught up in any of his antics. He was very heavy handed, I felt his punches the whole fight." He also mentioned how before the last round, his trainer Emanuel Steward told him he would be able to stop Mayorga in the last round, which was the conclusion of the fight.

=== Mayorga vs. Mosley II ===
Mayorga decided to make a comeback as a boxer and won two fights in 2014, after over three-and-a-half years since losing to Cotto. He was then scheduled to rematch Mosley (47–9–1) in a fight on pay-per-view at The Forum located in Inglewood, California on August 29, 2015. Mosley would again defeat Mayorga, this time by KO in the sixth round.

== Mixed martial arts career ==
On May 15, 2010, Mayorga was scheduled to make his professional MMA debut against UFC veteran Din Thomas on the Shine Fights: Worlds Collide: Mayorga vs. Thomas card. Don King filed for an injunction the week of the fight to prevent him from participating, claiming Mayorga had an exclusive contract with Don King Promotions (DKP).

Shine Fights stated that Mayorga's contract with DKP was for boxing, and as such did not apply to mixed martial arts. Judge Marc Gold granted the injunction just several hours before the fight. Later on the same day, Shine Fights officials conceded defeat in the matter and Mayorga was pulled off the card.

Following his retirement from boxing, Mayorga decided to properly embark on a professional MMA career and faced Wesley Tiffer on May 3, 2013. He was kept on the ground but able to survive round 1. Tiffer continued to grapple with him on the ground until Mayorga landed a controversial and illegal knee to Tiffer's spine, which left Tiffer screaming in pain. Mayorga won via TKO after Tiffer didn't answer the bell for round 3. The Nicaraguan Mixed Martial Arts Commission declared the fight a No Contest for the illegal knee a week later on May 10, 2013, and also suspended Mayorga for 3 months for being 20 pounds over the contracted weight limit of 165-lbs.

== Life after boxing ==
In the aftermath of his loss to Cotto, Mayorga went on record to state that he doesn't entirely dismiss the possibility of a comeback. Sources close to him predicted that he would return to the sport to face Antonio Margarito in a bout that would've supposedly been dubbed: "When villains collide", with the winner earning themselves one final shot at being able to resurrect their career and the loser permanently retiring from boxing – a fight that would've entertained fans not only at a press conference, but also inside the ring as well. The match did not take place.

== Professional boxing record ==
46 fights	32 wins	12 losses
By knockout	26	9
By decision	6	3
Draws	1	
No contests	1	

No.	Result	Record	Opponent	Type	Round, time	Date	Location	Notes
46	Loss	32–12–1 (1)	Lester Martínez	TKO	2 (6), 2:59	Apr 6, 2019	Cancha de Futeca, Guatemala City, Guatemala	
45	Loss	32–11–1 (1)	Rodolfo Gomez Jr.	TKO	8 (10), 1:29	Apr 7, 2018	Energy Arena, Laredo, Texas, U.S.	
44	Loss	32–10–1 (1)	Andrey Sirotkin	RTD	9 (12), 3:00	Nov 3, 2017	Trade Union Sport Palace, Nizhny Novgorod, Russia	For vacant WBA Inter-Continental super middleweight title
43	Win	32–9–1 (1)	Jeudiel Zepeda	TKO	3 (10), 2:50	Apr 1, 2017	Chaman Bar, Managua, Nicaragua	
42	Loss	31–9–1 (1)	Shane Mosley	KO	6 (12), 2:59	Aug 29, 2015	The Forum, Inglewood, California, U.S.	
41	Win	31–8–1 (1)	Andrik Saralegui	RTD	5 (8), 0:10	Dec 20, 2014	Puerto Salvador Allende, Managua, Nicaragua	
40	Win	30–8–1 (1)	Allen Medina	TKO	1 (6), 1:03	Sep 27, 2014	OKC Downtown Airpark, Oklahoma City, Oklahoma, U.S.	
39	Loss	29–8–1 (1)	Miguel Cotto	TKO	12 (12), 0:53	Mar 12, 2011	MGM Grand Garden Arena, Paradise, Nevada, U.S.	For WBA (Super) super welterweight title
38	Win	29–7–1 (1)	Michael Walker	TKO	9 (10), 1:09	Dec 17, 2010	American Airlines Arena, Miami, Florida, U.S.	
37	Loss	28–7–1 (1)	Shane Mosley	TKO	12 (12), 2:59	Sep 27, 2008	Home Depot Center, Carson, California, U.S.	For vacant WBA Inter-Continental super welterweight title
36	Win	28–6–1 (1)	Fernando Vargas	MD	12	Nov 23, 2007	Staples Center, Los Angeles, California, U.S.	Won vacant WBC Continental Americas super middleweight title
35	Loss	27–6–1 (1)	Oscar De La Hoya	TKO	6 (12), 1:25	May 6, 2006	MGM Grand Garden Arena, Paradise, Nevada, U.S.	Lost WBC super welterweight title
34	Win	27–5–1 (1)	Michele Piccirillo	UD	12	Aug 13, 2005	United Center, Chicago, Illinois, U.S.	Won vacant WBC super welterweight title
33	Loss	26–5–1 (1)	Félix Trinidad	TKO	8 (12), 2:39	Oct 2, 2004	Madison Square Garden, New York City, New York, U.S.	For vacant North American Boxing Council middleweight title
32	Win	26–4–1 (1)	Eric Mitchell	UD	10	Apr 17, 2004	Madison Square Garden, New York City, New York, U.S.	
31	Loss	25–4–1 (1)	Cory Spinks	MD	12	Dec 13, 2003	Boardwalk Hall, Atlantic City, New Jersey, U.S.	Lost WBA (Unified), WBC and The Ring welterweight titles; For IBF welterweight title
30	Win	25–3–1 (1)	Vernon Forrest	MD	12	Jul 12, 2003	The Orleans, Paradise, Nevada, U.S.	Retained WBA (Unified), WBC and The Ring welterweight titles
29	Win	24–3–1 (1)	Vernon Forrest	TKO	3 (12), 2:06	Jan 25, 2003	Pechanga Resort & Casino, Temecula, California, U.S.	Retained WBA (Unified) welterweight title; Won WBC and The Ring welterweight titles
28	Win	23–3–1 (1)	Andrew Lewis	TKO	5 (12), 1:08	Mar 30, 2002	Sovereign Center, Reading, Pennsylvania, U.S.	Won WBA welterweight title
27	NC	22–3–1 (1)	Andrew Lewis	NC	2 (12), 0:07	Jul 28, 2001	Staples Center, Los Angeles, California, U.S.	WBA welterweight title at stake; NC after Lewis was cut from an accidental head clash
26	Win	22–3–1	Elias Cruz	TKO	3 (10), 2:48	Feb 3, 2001	Mandalay Bay Events Center, Paradise, Nevada, U.S.	
25	Win	21–3–1	Adolfo Salazar	KO	1 (12), 0:41	Dec 16, 2000	Forum Bicentenario, Maracay, Venezuela	Retained WBA Fedelatin super welterweight title
24	Win	20–3–1	Elvis Guerrero	KO	2 (10)	Nov 24, 2000	San José, Costa Rica	
23	Win	19–3–1	Feliberto Alvarez	UD	12	Aug 31, 2000	Hotel Melia Cariari, San José, Costa Rica	Won vacant WBC FECARBOX super welterweight title
22	Win	18–3–1	Walter Palacios	UD	10	Jul 28, 2000	Hotel Melia Cariari, Belén, Costa Rica	
21	Win	17–3–1	Elio Ortiz	KO	10 (12)	Jun 3, 2000	Hotel Melia Cariari, San José, Costa Rica	Retained WBA Fedelatin super welterweight title
20	Win	16–3–1	Manuel De la Rosa	KO	1 (12)	May 6, 2000	San José, Costa Rica	Retained WBC FECARBOX super welterweight title
19	Win	15–3–1	German Espinales	KO	4 (12)	Apr 7, 2000	San José, Costa Rica	Won vacant WBC FECARBOX super welterweight title
18	Win	14–3–1	Marco Antonio Avendano	TKO	2 (12)	Mar 18, 2000	Turmero, Venezuela	Won WBA Fedelatin super welterweight title
17	Draw	13–3–1	Diosbelys Hurtado	TD	2 (10)	Nov 27, 1999	Carolina, Puerto Rico	TD after an accidental head clash
16	Win	13–3	Giovanni Duran	TKO	4 (10)	Sep 25, 1999	San José, Costa Rica	
15	Win	12–3	Jose Córdoba	KO	1 (12)	Jul 24, 1999	San José, Costa Rica	Won vacant WBC FECARBOX welterweight title
14	Win	11–3	Walter Palacios	KO	8 (10)	Jun 12, 1999	San José, Costa Rica	
13	Win	10–3	Henry Castillo	TKO	7 (10)	Apr 24, 1999	San José, Costa Rica	
12	Win	9–3	Rafael Valdes	KO	1 (10)	Mar 13, 1999	San José, Costa Rica	
11	Loss	8–3	Henry Castillo	PTS	10	Sep 13, 1998	San José, Costa Rica	
10	Loss	8–2	Roger Benito Flores	UD	10	May 16, 1998	Gimnasio Alexis Argüello, Managua, Nicaragua	
9	Win	8–1	German Espinales	TKO	4 (10)	Jan 6, 1998	Managua, Nicaragua	
8	Win	7–1	Miguel Angel Perez	TKO	3 (10)	Dec 16, 1995	Managua, Nicaragua	
7	Win	6–1	Adolfo Mendez	TKO	2 (10)	Sep 30, 1995	Managua, Nicaragua	
6	Win	5–1	Benjamin Rivas	TKO	8 (10)	Feb 18, 1995	Gimnasio Alexis Argüello, Managua, Nicaragua	
5	Win	4–1	Miguel Angel Perez	TKO	6 (12)	Jan 28, 1995	Managua, Nicaragua	Won vacant Nicaraguan light welterweight title
4	Win	3–1	David Salguera	KO	6 (10)	May 20, 1994	San José, Costa Rica	
3	Loss	2–1	Humberto Aranda	TKO	6 (10)	Aug 29, 1993	San José, Costa Rica	
2	Win	2–0	Jose Miguel Alvarado	RTD	5 (8)	Aug 13, 1993	Gimnasio Municipal, Desamparados, Costa Rica	
1	Win	1–0	Jose Morales	KO	3 (10)	Jul 20, 1993	San José, Costa Rica	

== Mixed martial arts record ==
Professional record breakdown
4 matches	0 wins	3 losses
By submission	0	2
By decision	0	1
No contests	1	

Res.	Record	Opponent	Method	Event	Date	Round	Time	Location	Notes
Loss	0–3 (1)	Sergio Ortiz	Submission (armbar)	World Series of Fighting 2: Central America	December 14, 2013	2	4:23	Pharaoh's Casino, Managua, Nicaragua	
Loss	0–2 (1)	Sergio Ortiz	Decision (split)	CRF 6: Center Real Fights	October 12, 2013	3	5:00	San José, Costa Rica, Costa Rica	
Loss	0–1 (1)	René Martinez	Submission (guillotine choke)	World Series of Fighting 1: Central America	July 27, 2013	1	1:45	Nicaragua National Football Stadium, Managua, Nicaragua	
NC	0–0 (1)	Wesley Tiffer	No Contest (illegal knee)	Omega MMA: Battle of the Americas	May 3, 2013	2	5:00	Pharaoh's Casino, Managua, Nicaragua	Originally a TKO win; result overturned

== Titles in boxing ==
=== Major world titles ===
- WBA (Super) welterweight champion (147 lbs)
- WBC welterweight champion (147 lbs)
- WBC super welterweight champion (154 lbs)

=== The Ring magazine titles ===
- The Ring welterweight champion (147 lbs)

== Pay-per-view bouts ==
Date	Fight	Billing	Buys	Network
May 6, 2006	De La Hoya vs. Mayorga	Danger Zone	925,000	HBO

== See also ==
- List of welterweight boxing champions
- List of light middleweight boxing champions

Sporting positions
Regional boxing titles
Inaugural champion	Nicaraguan light welterweight champion January 28, 1995 – February 1995; Vacated	Vacant Title next held by Rosemberg Gomez
Vacant Title last held by Eric Hernandez	WBC FECARBOX welterweight champion July 24, 1999 – September 1999; Vacated	Vacant Title next held by Jose Luis Cruz
Preceded by Marco Antonio Avendano	WBA Fedelatin super welterweight champion March 18, 2000 – July 28, 2001; Failed to win world title	Vacant Title next held by Santiago Samaniego
Vacant Title last held by Humberto Aranda	WBC FECARBOX super welterweight champion April 7, 2000 – July 2000; Vacated	Vacant Title next held by Carlos Bojorquez
Vacant Title last held by Kingsley Ikeke	WBC FECARBOX super welterweight champion August 31, 2000 – September 2000; Vacated	Vacant Title next held by Carlos Bojorquez
Vacant Title last held by Lucian Bute	WBC Continental Americas super middleweight champion November 23, 2007 – April 2008; Vacated	Vacant Title next held by Adonis Stevenson
World boxing titles
Preceded by Andrew Lewis	WBA welterweight champion March 30, 2002 – January 25, 2003; Promoted	Vacant Title next held by José Antonio Rivera as Regular champion
New title	WBA welterweight champion Super title January 25, 2003 – December 13, 2003	Succeeded by Cory Spinks
Preceded by Vernon Forrest	WBC welterweight champion January 25, 2003 – December 13, 2003	Succeeded by Cory Spinks
Preceded by Vernon Forrest	The Ring welterweight champion January 25, 2003 – December 13, 2003	Succeeded by Cory Spinks
Preceded by Vernon Forrest	Lineal welterweight champion January 25, 2003 – December 13, 2003	Succeeded by Cory Spinks
Vacant Title last held by Javier Castillejo stripped	WBC super welterweight champion August 13, 2005 – May 6, 2006	Succeeded by Oscar De La Hoya
