= Cory Spinks =

American boxer (born 1978)

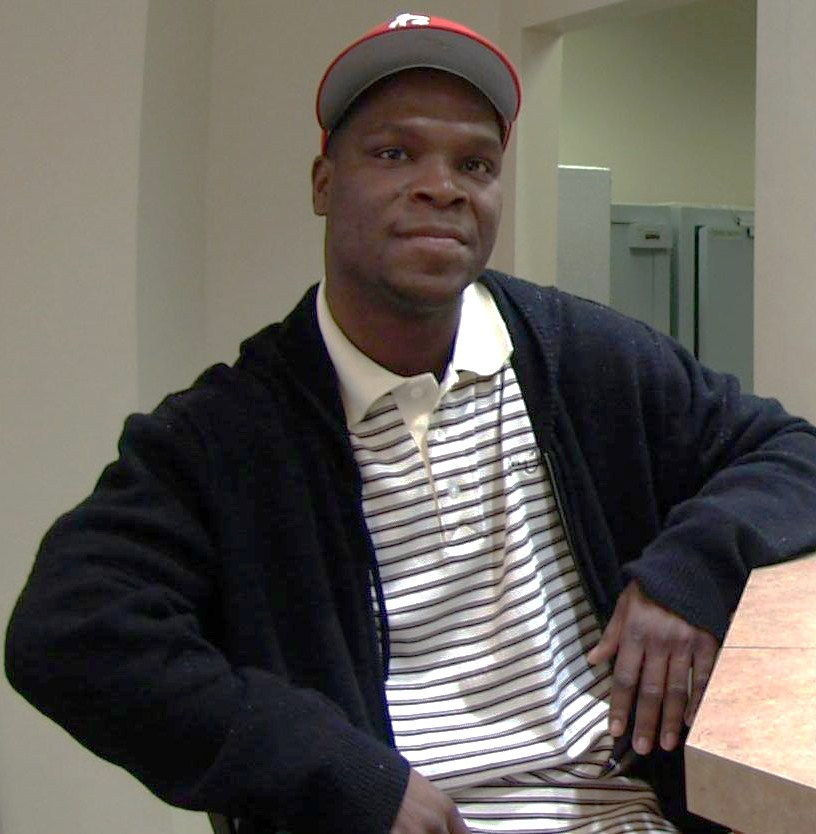
- Spinks in 2007

Personal information
- Nickname: The Next Generation
- Born: Cory Calvin; February 20, 1978 (age 48) St. Louis, Missouri, U.S.
- Height: 5 ft 9 1/2 in (177 cm)
- Weight: Light welterweight; Welterweight; Light middleweight; Middleweight

Boxing career
- Reach: 71 in (180 cm)
- Stance: Southpaw

Boxing record
- Total fights: 47
- Wins: 39
- Win by KO: 11
- Losses: 8
Medal record
Men's amateur boxing
US National Golden Gloves
Gold medal – first place	1997 Colorado Springs	Welterweight

Cory Spinks (born Cory Calvin; February 20, 1978) is an American former professional boxer who competed from 1997 to 2013. He held multiple world championships in two weight classes, including the undisputed welterweight title from 2003 to 2005, and the IBF junior middleweight title twice between 2006 and 2010. Additionally, he challenged once for the lineal middleweight title in 2007.

== Early life and amateur career ==
Spinks is the son of former world heavyweight champion Leon Spinks and nephew of former world heavyweight and light heavyweight champion Michael Spinks. He has an amateur record of 78–3, and won the National Golden Gloves and National Police Athletic League welterweight titles in 1997.

== Professional career ==
=== Undisputed welterweight champion ===
Spinks went 29–2 in his first 31 contests, only losing to Antonio Díaz (regarded as a controversial decision by some boxing analysts and ringside observers) and Michele Piccirillo, whom he defeated by decision in a re-match.

However, Spinks rose to boxing stardom by unifying the WBC, WBA, IBF, and The Ring and lineal welterweight titles on December 13, 2003, when he defeated Ricardo Mayorga by majority decision. Spinks was a 5 to 1 underdog going into the fight with Mayorga. The judges scored the fight 114–112, 117–109, 114-114, favoring Spinks.

=== Spinks vs. Judah I, II ===
Spink's first Welterweight title defense came on April 10, 2004, against former world champion Zab Judah. Spinks controlled the action over the first four rounds. In the later rounds, however, Judah's quick left hands began to find their target. Both men hit the deck late, but all three scorecards favored Spinks, as the champion won with scores of 116–111, 114–112, 114–112.

Spink's second Welterweight defence came when the two fighters met in a February 2005 rematch. The second fight was the first major bout in St. Louis in more than 40 years, and it was a 22,000+ sellout at the Savvis Center in St. Louis, Missouri. Spinks received star treatment during introductions, with rapper Nelly accompanying him into the ring and leading the crowd in a singalong.

Midway through round 9, Judah landed a huge left that hurt Spinks, with a follow-up putting him on the canvas. Spinks rose, but Judah rushed in with a series of hard punches that left Spinks defenseless on the ropes. Judah tried to get the official to step in, but the bout continued until another right-left sent Spinks sprawling into the ropes, where the official finally halted the bout with 11 seconds left, transferring the undisputed Welterweight Championship to Judah.

=== IBF junior middleweight champion ===
On July 8, 2006, Spinks earned his fifth world title, the IBF Junior Middleweight Championship (also called Super Welterweight by some sanctioning bodies), in a fight with reigning champion Roman Karmazin at the Savvis Center. Despite having some rough moments in the bout, Spinks beat Karmazin by majority decision with final scorecards of 114-114, 115–113, and 115–113.

=== Unified middleweight title challenge ===
On May 19, 2007, Spinks moved up one weight class to Middleweight with a challenge against World Middleweight Champion Jermain Taylor at the FedEx Forum in Memphis. Taylor held on to the title, defeating Spinks in a split decision.

=== Losing and regaining the IBF title ===
On March 27, 2008, in a fight with Verno Phillips at the Scottrade Center in St. Louis, Spinks lost the IBF Junior Middleweight Championship via controversial split decision.

On April 24, 2009, Spinks reclaimed the vacant IBF Junior Middleweight Championship in a close split-decision victory over fellow St. Louis native Deandre Latimore. Spinks fought back after suffering a 1st round knockdown to win by the scores of 115-112 Spinks, 115-112 Latimore and 114-113 Spinks. The fight was held at the Scottrade Center in St. Louis.

On August 7, 2010, after a five-month delay due to scheduling conflicts, Spinks lost the IBF Junior Middleweight Championship in a fight with mandatory challenger Cornelius Bundrage at the Scottrade Center in St. Louis. The fight was decided by a technical knockout in the fifth round.

On January 28, 2012, Spinks defeated Sechew Powell by unanimous decision to become the #1 and mandatory contender for Bundrage's IBF Junior Middleweight Title, his second consecutive victory since coming back from the loss to Bundrage. The fight took place at The Shrine Mosque in Springfield, Missouri.

== Professional boxing record ==
47 fights	39 wins	8 losses
By knockout	11	3
By decision	27	5
By disqualification	1	0

No.	Result	Record	Opponent	Type	Round, time	Date	Location	Notes
47	Loss	39–8	Carlos Molina	UD	12	Feb 1, 2013	UIC Pavilion, Chicago, Illinois, U.S.	
46	Loss	39–7	Cornelius Bundrage	TKO	7 (12), 2:32	Jun 30, 2012	Fantasy Springs Resort Casino, Indio, California, U.S.	For IBF junior middleweight title
45	Win	39–6	Sechew Powell	UD	12	Jan 28, 2012	Abou Ben Adhem Shrine Mosque, Springfield, Missouri, U.S.	
44	Win	38–6	Shakir Ashanti	UD	10	Jun 25, 2011	Family Arena, St. Charles, Missouri, U.S.	
43	Loss	37–6	Cornelius Bundrage	TKO	5 (12), 1:28	Aug 7, 2010	Scottrade Center, St. Louis, Missouri, U.S.	Lost IBF junior middleweight title
42	Win	37–5	Deandre Latimore	SD	12	Apr 24, 2009	Scottrade Center, St. Louis, Missouri, U.S.	Won vacant IBF junior middleweight title
41	Loss	36–5	Verno Phillips	SD	12	Mar 27, 2008	Scottrade Center, St. Louis, Missouri, U.S.	Lost IBF junior middleweight title
40	Loss	36–4	Jermain Taylor	SD	12	May 19, 2007	FedEx Forum, Memphis, Tennessee, U.S.	For WBC, WBO, and The Ring middleweight titles
39	Win	36–3	Rodney Jones	UD	12	Feb 3, 2007	Silver Spurs Arena, Kissimmee, Florida, U.S.	Retained IBF junior middleweight title
38	Win	35–3	Roman Karmazin	MD	12	Jul 8, 2006	Savvis Center, St. Louis, Missouri, U.S.	Won IBF junior middleweight title
37	Loss	34–3	Zab Judah	TKO	9 (12), 2:49	Feb 5, 2005	Savvis Center, St. Louis, Missouri, U.S.	Lost WBA (Undisputed), WBC, IBF, and The Ring welterweight titles
36	Win	34–2	Miguel Ángel González	UD	12	Sep 4, 2004	Mandalay Bay Events Center, Paradise, Nevada, U.S.	Retained WBA (Undisputed), WBC, IBF, and The Ring welterweight titles
35	Win	33–2	Zab Judah	UD	12	Apr 10, 2004	Mandalay Bay Events Center, Paradise, Nevada, U.S.	Retained WBA (Undisputed), WBC, IBF, and The Ring welterweight titles
34	Win	32–2	Ricardo Mayorga	MD	12	Dec 13, 2003	Boardwalk Hall, Atlantic City, New Jersey, U.S.	Retained IBF welterweight title; Won WBA (Undisputed), WBC, and The Ring welterweight titles
33	Win	31–2	Michele Piccirillo	UD	12	Mar 22, 2003	Casinò, Campione d'Italia, Italy	Won IBF welterweight title
32	Win	30–2	Rafael Pineda	TD	7 (12), 3:00	Aug 23, 2002	Jai-Alai Fronton, Miami, Florida, U.S.	Won vacant WBA Fedelatin welterweight title; Split TD after Spinks cut from accidental head clash
31	Loss	29–2	Michele Piccirillo	UD	12	Apr 13, 2002	Casinò, Campione d'Italia, Italy	For vacant IBF welterweight title
30	Win	29–1	Charles Ward	UD	8	Dec 6, 2001	Adam's Mark Hotel, St. Louis, Missouri, U.S.	
29	Win	28–1	Larry Marks	UD	12	Aug 17, 2001	DePaul University, Chicago, Illinois, U.S.	Won vacant USBA welterweight title
28	Win	27–1	Leonard Townsend	TD	4 (10), 2:18	Mar 23, 2001	Sportscenter, Owensboro, Kentucky, U.S.	
27	Win	26–1	Dennis Allen	TKO	2 (10), 2:17	Feb 23, 2001	Frank Erwin Center, Austin, Texas, U.S.	
26	Win	25–1	Luis Vazquez	UD	10	Dec 15, 2000	Alliant Energy Center, Madison, Wisconsin, U.S.	
25	Win	24–1	Edgar Ruiz	UD	10	Nov 17, 2000	Peppermill, Reno, Nevada, U.S.	
24	Win	23–1	Jorge Vaca	TKO	7 (12), 1:35	Sep 17, 2000	Harrah's, St. Louis, Missouri, U.S.	Won vacant WBO–NABO welterweight title
23	Win	22–1	Ken Manuel	TKO	3 (6), 2:00	Jan 18, 2000	The Ambassador, St. Louis, Missouri, U.S.	
22	Win	21–1	Sammy Sparkman	UD	8	Nov 26, 1999	New Orleans Arena, New Orleans, Louisiana, U.S.	
21	Win	20–1	Verdell Smith	UD	10	Jul 12, 1999	Harrah's, North Kansas City, Missouri, U.S.	
20	Win	19–1	Rodolfo Gomez	UD	8	Jun 11, 1999	Motor Speedway, Fort Worth, Texas, U.S.	
19	Win	18–1	Mark Hammon	KO	9 (12), 1:33	May 17, 1999	Harrah's, North Kansas City, Missouri, U.S.	Won vacant IBA Continental junior welterweight title
18	Win	17–1	Teddy Worth	UD	6	Apr 22, 1999	Adam's Mark Hotel, Tulsa, Oklahoma, U.S.	
17	Win	16–1	Ken Manuel	TKO	2 (6), 1:20	Apr 3, 1999	Civic Arena, St. Joseph, Missouri, U.S.	
16	Win	15–1	John Stewart	KO	1 (6), 1:20	Mar 11, 1999	Heart Banquet Center, St. Charles, Missouri, U.S.	
15	Win	14–1	Larry Kenney	DQ	6 (6), 1:45	Mar 2, 1999	The Ambassador, St. Louis, Missouri, U.S.	
14	Loss	13–1	Antonio Díaz	SD	12	Dec 12, 1998	Fantasy Springs Resort Casino, Indio, California, U.S.	For IBA junior welterweight title
13	Win	13–0	Mike Cooley	KO	1 (6), 1:55	Oct 6, 1998	The Ambassador, St. Louis, Missouri, U.S.	
12	Win	12–0	Ken Durham	TKO	4 (6)	Oct 1, 1998	Harrah's, St. Louis, Missouri, U.S.	
11	Win	11–0	Javier Guadalupe Suazo	UD	6	Sep 18, 1998	Thomas & Mack Center, Paradise, Nevada, U.S.	
10	Win	10–0	Clifton Woods	KO	3 (6), 1:42	Aug 4, 1998	The Ambassador, St. Louis, Missouri, U.S.	
9	Win	9–0	Abraham Bruno	UD	6	Jun 14, 1998	Etess Arena, Atlantic City, New Jersey, U.S.	
8	Win	8–0	Reggie Strickland	UD	4	Jun 2, 1998	The Ambassador, St. Louis, Missouri, U.S.	
7	Win	7–0	Juan Antonio Gonzalez	UD	4	May 16, 1998	Fantasy Springs Resort Casino, Indio, California, U.S.	
6	Win	6–0	Andre Hawthorne	UD	4	Apr 7, 1998	The Ambassador, Jennings, Missouri, U.S.	
5	Win	5–0	Carlos Horacio Nevarez	UD	4	Mar 19, 1998	Thornton, Colorado, U.S.	
4	Win	4–0	Lamont Buchanan	KO	1 (4), 2:18	Feb 3, 1998	The Ambassador, St. Louis, Missouri, U.S.	
3	Win	3–0	Jim Williams	TKO	2 (4), 1:34	Jan 23, 1998	Grand Casino, Tunica, Mississippi, U.S.	
2	Win	2–0	David Turner	UD	4	Dec 2, 1997	The Ambassador, St. Louis, Missouri, U.S.	
1	Win	1–0	Hector Leguillow	UD	4	Nov 21, 1997	Station Casino, Kansas City, Missouri, U.S.	

== Titles in boxing ==
=== Major world titles ===
- WBA (Undisputed) welterweight champion (147 lbs)
- WBC welterweight champion (147 lbs)
- IBF welterweight champion (147 lbs)
- IBF light middleweight champion (154 lbs) (2×)

=== The Ring magazine titles ===
- The Ring welterweight champion (147 lbs)

=== Minor world titles ===
- IBA light welterweight champion (140 lbs)

=== Regional/International titles ===
- WBA Fedelatin welterweight champion (147 lbs)
- USBA welterweight champion (147 lbs)
- NABO welterweight champion (147 lbs)
- IBA Continental light welterweight champion (140 lbs)

=== Undisputed titles ===
- Undisputed welterweight champion

== See also ==
- List of undisputed boxing champions
- List of welterweight boxing champions
- List of light middleweight boxing champions
- List of WBA world champions
- List of WBC world champions
- List of IBF world champions
- List of The Ring world champions
- List of notable boxing families

Sporting positions
Amateur boxing titles
Previous: Brandon Mitchell	U.S. Golden Gloves welterweight champion 1997	Next: Anthony Hanshaw
Regional boxing titles
Vacant Title last held by Antonio Margarito	WBO–NABO welterweight champion September 17, 2000 – August 2001; Vacated	Vacant Title next held by José Celaya
Vacant Title last held by Raul Frank	USBA welterweight champion August 17, 2001 – April 13, 2002; Lost bid for IBF title	Vacant Title next held by Ishe Smith
Vacant Title last held by Juan Carlos Sanchez	WBA Fedelatin welterweight champion August 23, 2002 – March 2003; Vacated	Vacant Title next held by Walter Javier Crucce
World boxing titles
Preceded by Michele Piccirillo	IBF welterweight champion March 22, 2003 – February 5, 2005	Succeeded by Zab Judah
Preceded by Ricardo Mayorga as Super champion	WBA welterweight champion Undisputed title December 13, 2003 – February 5, 2005; Super title until May 2004	Succeeded by Zab Judah
Preceded by Ricardo Mayorga	WBC welterweight champion December 13, 2003 – February 5, 2005	Succeeded by Zab Judah
Preceded by Ricardo Mayorga	The Ring welterweight champion December 13, 2003 – February 5, 2005	Succeeded by Zab Judah
Vacant Title last held by Lloyd Honeyghan	Undisputed welterweight champion December 13, 2003 – February 5, 2005	Succeeded by Zab Judah
Preceded by Roman Karmazin	IBF junior middleweight champion July 8, 2006 – March 27, 2008	Succeeded by Verno Phillips
Vacant Title last held by Verno Phillips	IBF junior middleweight champion April 24, 2009 – August 7, 2010	Succeeded by Cornelius Bundrage
