= Roy Jones Jr. vs. Antonio Tarver II =

Boxing competition

More Than Personal
- Date: May 15, 2004
- Venue: Mandalay Bay Resort & Casino, Paradise, Nevada, U.S.
- Title(s) on the line: WBA (Unified), WBC, IBA, IBO, The Ring, and vacant WBF (Foundation), light heavyweight titles

Tale of the tape
Boxer	Roy Jones Jr.	Antonio Tarver
Nickname	Junior	The Magic Man
Hometown	Pensacola, Florida, U.S.	Orlando, Florida, U.S.
Purse	$6,000,000	$2,000,000
Pre-fight record	49–1 (38 KO)	21–2 (17 KO)
Age	35 years, 3 months	35 years, 5 months
Height	5 ft 11 in (180 cm)	6 ft 2 in (188 cm)
Weight	174 lb (79 kg)	175 lb (79 kg)
Style	Orthodox	Southpaw
Recognition	WBA (Unified), WBC, IBA, IBO, and The Ring; Light Heavyweight Champion; The Ring No. 1 ranked pound-for-pound fighter 4-division world champion	WBC/The Ring; No. 1 Ranked Light Heavyweight; WBA; No. 2 Ranked Light Heavyweight; Former unified light heavyweight champion The Ring No. 10 ranked pound-for-pound fighter

Result
- Tarver wins via 2nd-round TKO

Roy Jones Jr. vs. Antonio Tarver II, billed as More Than Personal, was a professional boxing match contested for the WBA (Unified), WBC, IBA, IBO, The Ring, and vacant WBF light heavyweight titles.

== Background ==
The two men had previously fought each other on November 8, 2003. Jones, in his previous fight at heavyweight against John Ruiz on March 1, 2003, had weighed in at 193 pounds and was at 199 pounds on the night of the fight against Ruiz. In his following fight, which was Jones' first fight against Tarver, Jones was clearly weakened and slower in the ring after losing 24 pounds to get back down to the 175 pound light heavyweight limit, while Tarver, who had captured the WBC and IBF titles Jones had vacated after his WBA heavyweight title win against John Ruiz in March, was able to land several punching combinations through the course of his first fight against Jones and fought a closely contested fight. However, while one judge scored the bout a draw (114–114), the other two judges had Jones clearly ahead by scores of 117–111 and 116–112, giving Jones the win by majority decision. Following his victory, Jones initially talked about returning to the heavyweight division to take on Mike Tyson in what would be his final fight. The planned Jones–Tyson superfight never came into fruition and Jones eventually decided to meet Tarver in a rematch on May 15, 2004.

== The fight ==
Jones got off to a good start and served as the aggressor of the first round using his trademark quickness to his advantage and easily won the first round of the fight on all three of the judges' scorecards. Jones attempted to repeat his success in the second round as Tarver held back, seemingly waiting for Jones to make a mistake. Just over midway through the round, Jones attempted to hit Tarver with a right hand, Tarver however countered with a quick left hook that dropped Jones to the canvas for only the second time in his professional career (Lou Del Valle scored a knockdown against Jones in 1998). Jones struggled to get back up but eventually made it back to his feet, however referee Jay Nady deemed Jones too hurt to continue and quickly ended the fight and Tarver was rewarded with the knockout victory. It was the second loss of Jones' professional career and the first time that he had been knocked out. Jones' previous loss had come via disqualification against Montell Griffin in 1997, a loss which was avenged by Jones with a first round knockout of Griffin in the rematch later that year. The manner of Jones' loss to Tarver was arguably the biggest surprise in boxing since James "Buster" Douglas had knocked out Mike Tyson on February 11, 1990 as a 42/1 outsider. Jones' loss ended his near decade reign at the top in boxing's pound for pound list.

== Aftermath ==
A little over four months later, Jones returned to face Glen Johnson in an attempt to regain the IBF light heavyweight title (Johnson had defeated Clinton Woods to capture the title after Tarver vacated it just prior to the first fight with Jones). Though Jones came into the fight as a heavy favorite, he trailed Johnson on all three scorecards (75–77, 75–77, 74–78) before he was knocked out for the second consecutive time, this time in the ninth round by an overhand right to the head from Johnson which saw Jones laying down on the canvas for some minutes afterwards, producing an even more shocking knockout loss for Jones than against Tarver in his previous fight. After Jones' loss, it was Tarver who fought Johnson next. However, prior to the fight both the WBA and WBC stripped Tarver of their titles while the IBF stripped Johnson of their title after the two men decided to face each other rather than the organizations' mandatory challengers. As a result only Tarver's IBO and The Ring titles were on the line. For the second straight fight, Johnson picked up the upset win after defeating Tarver by split decision (one judge scored the fight 116–112 in favor of Tarver while the other two judges scored the fight 115–113 for Johnson). After Tarver defeated Johnson by unanimous decision in a rematch to recapture his titles, a rubbermatch with Jones was set for October 1, 2005.

== Undercard ==
Confirmed bouts:

Winner	Loser	Weight division/title belt(s) disputed	Result
(United States) Zab Judah	(Colombia) Rafael Pineda	vacant WBO Inter-Continental Welterweight title WBO Welterweight eliminator	Split decision
(United States) Gerald Nobles	(United States) Bruce Seldon	Heavyweight (10 rounds)	9th round TKO
(Mexico) Víctor Burgos	(Thailand) Fahlan Sakkreerin	IBF World Light flyweight title	6th round TKO
Non-TV bouts
(United States) Rico Hoye	(Jamaica) Richard Hall	IBF Light Heavyweight title eliminator	4th round KO
(United States) Larry Donald	(United States) Sedreck Fields	Heavyweight (10 rounds)	Unanimous decision
(Russia) Roman Karmazin	(United States) Jason Papillion	Middleweight (8 rounds)	No Contest
(United States) Rob Dula	(United States) Eric Howard	Super middleweight (8 rounds)	Unanimous decision
(Jamaica) Owen Beck	(United States) Byron Polley	Heavyweight (8 rounds)	1st round TKO
(Croatia) Mario Preskar	(Brazil) Marcelino Novaes	Heavyweight (4 rounds)	Unanimous Draw
(United States) Vaughn Alexander	(United States) Jesus Meza	Light middleweight (4 rounds)	1st round KO

== Broadcasting ==
Country	Broadcaster
Australia	Main Event
United States	HBO

Preceded by First Bout	Roy Jones Jr.'s bouts 15 May 2004	Succeeded by vs. Glen Johnson
Preceded by First Bout	Antonio Tarver's bouts 15 May 2004	Succeeded by vs. Glen Johnson
Awards
Previous: Rocky Juarez vs. Antonio Diaz	The Ring Knockout of the Year; 2004	Next: Allan Green vs. Jaidon Codrington
