= Roy Jones Jr. vs. Clinton Woods =

Boxing match

Rumble at the Rose Garden
- Date: September 7, 2002
- Venue: Rose Garden, Portland, Oregon, U.S.
- Title(s) on the line: WBA, WBC, IBF, IBO, WBF, IBA, NBA and The Ring light heavyweight titles

Tale of the tape
Boxer	Roy Jones Jr.	Clinton Woods
Nickname	Junior	
Hometown	Pensacola, Florida, U.S.	Sheffield, England
Pre-fight record	46–1 (37 KO)	32–1 (19 KO)
Age	33 years, 7 months	30 years, 4 months
Height	5 ft 11 in (180 cm)	6 ft 2 in (188 cm)
Weight	175 lb (79 kg)	174 lb (79 kg)
Style	Orthodox	Orthodox
Recognition	WBA, WBC, IBF, IBO, WBF, IBA, NBA and The Ring; Light Heavyweight champion The Ring No. 2 ranked pound-for-pound fighter 3-division world champion	WBC/WBO; No. 1 Ranked Light Heavyweight; WBA; No. 3 Ranked Light Heavyweight

Result
- Jones wins via 6th-round technical knockout

Roy Jones Jr. vs. Clinton Woods, billed as Rumble at the Rose Garden, was a professional boxing match contested on September 7, 2002, for the WBA, WBC, IBF, IBO, WBF, IBA, NBA and The Ring light heavyweight titles.

== Background ==
Having opened 2002 with a dominating victory over his IBF-mandated challenger Glen Kelly in early February, unified light heavyweight champion Roy Jones Jr. mulled his next fight. Cable network HBO pushed Jones to face long-time middleweight champion Bernard Hopkins, whom he had previously defeated nine years earlier, but Jones refused to budge on his demands that he should be paid more than Hopkins and that fight fell through. Dariusz Michalczewski, the WBO and lineal light heavyweight champion was also discussed as a possible opponent, but neither he nor Jones would agree to fight in each other's respective countries. With Jones two biggest fights squashed, Jones turned to another mandatory challenger, Clinton Woods, the WBC's number-one ranked contender. Woods was in attendance for Jones' fight against Kelly and said at the press conference, "I've been told I'm the best in Europe, I think I deserve a shot. He's the greatest fighter. I hope to be the greatest fighter."

In early May 2002, Woods was officially announced as Jones' next challenger. Original plans called for Jones, who had yet to fight professionally outside of his native U.S., to travel to Woods' native United Kingdom to face him in either his hometown Sheffield Arena or London's Wembley Arena. However, Jones would do an about face in late July and decided against fighting in England and opted to stage the fight in the U.S. at Portland, Oregon's Rose Garden. The venue change had come about due in large part to Jones' partnership with the Oregon-based Nike's Air Jordan brand. Air Jordan president Larry Miller disclosed that Nike had "provided an undisclosed amount of money to make the fight happen." adding that Nike was not entering the boxing business and the Jones fight was a "one-time deal."

Jones made a lengthy, extravagant entrance performing his song "And Still" from his recently released debut album Round One: The Album.

== Fight details ==
Jones dominated an overmatched Woods from the opening bell. Woods would land only 39 punches through six round while Jones punished him throughout, landing 140 punches, 122 of which were power punches. Jones did not score a knockdown during the fight, but the rounds were so lopsided in Jones' favor that all three judges scored several rounds 10–8 in Jones favor. The end came after a particularly lopsided sixth in which Jones landed 21 punches to Woods' zero, the fight was stopped midway through after Woods' corner, having seen enough, waved a white towel to signify surrender. Referee Jay Nady then stopped the fight, giving Jones the victory by technical knockout.

== Fight card ==
Confirmed bouts:

Weight Class	Weight		vs.		Method	Round	Notes
Light Heavyweight	175 lbs.	Roy Jones Jr. (c)	def.	Clinton Woods	TKO	6/12	^{note 1}
Junior Middleweight	154 lbs.	Ronald Wright (c)	def.	Bronco McKart	DQ	8/12	^{note 2}
Lightweight	135 lbs.	Lemuel Nelson	def.	Johnny West	TKO	7/12	^{note 3}
Lightweight	135 lbs.	Emmitt Linton	vs.	Charles Whittaker	NC	4/10

^Note 1 For WBA, WBC, IBF, IBO, WBF, IBA, NBA and The Ring Light Heavvyweight titles
^Note 2 For IBF Junior Middlweight title
^Note 3 For vacant NBA Lightweight title

== Broadcasting ==
Country	Broadcaster
United Kingdom	BBC
United States	HBO

Preceded by vs. Glen Kelly	Roy Jones Jr.'s bouts 7 September 2002	Succeeded by vs. John Ruiz
Preceded by vs. Clint Johnson	Clinton Woods's bouts 7 September 2002	Succeeded by vs. Sergio Martin Beaz
