= Bernard Hopkins vs. Roy Jones Jr. II =

Boxing competition

The Rivals
- Date: April 3, 2010
- Venue: Mandalay Bay Events Center, Las Vegas, Nevada, U.S.

Tale of the tape
Boxer	Bernard Hopkins	Roy Jones Jr.
Nickname	The Executioner	Junior
Hometown	Philadelphia, Pennsylvania, U.S.	Pensacola, Florida, U.S.
Pre-fight record	50–5–1 (1) (32 KO)	54–6 (38 KO)
Age	45 years, 2 months	41 years, 2 months
Height	6 ft 1 in (185 cm)	5 ft 11 in (180 cm)
Weight	175 lb (79 kg)	175 lb (79 kg)
Style	Orthodox	Orthodox
Recognition	WBO; No. 1 Ranked Light Heavyweight; The Ring; No. 3 Ranked Light Heavyweight; The Ring No. 4 ranked pound-for-pound fighter 2-division world champion	IBF; No. 5 Ranked Light Heavyweight; WBC; No. 6 Ranked Light Heavyweight; WBO; No. 11 Ranked Light Heavyweight; 4-division world champion

Result
- Hopkins wins via 12-round unanimous decision (117-110, 117-110, 118-109)

Bernard Hopkins vs. Roy Jones Jr. II, billed as The Rivals, was a professional boxing match contested on April 3, 2010. The fight was a rematch of the May 22, 1993 bout between the two where Jones defeated Hopkins for the IBF middleweight title.

== Background ==
Hopkins and Jones had first met 17 years prior on May 22, 1993 for the vacant IBF middleweight championship (the bout was held on the undercard of the Riddick Bowe–Jesse Ferguson heavyweight title bout). The then-up-and-coming fighters were the two top ranked middleweights at the time, with Hopkins being ranked at number one by the IBF, while Jones was number two. Jones used his strength and quickness to defeat Hopkins by unanimous decision with all three judge's scoring the bout 116–112 in Jones' favor. After their fight, both men would go on to have two of the most successful careers in the sport.

In the next 11 years, Jones pick up world titles in the super middleweight, light heavyweight and heavyweight divisions, collecting only one disqualification loss in that span while also becoming the unified light heavyweight champion after unifying the WBA, WBC and IBF titles in 1999. Hopkins, meanwhile, would go on and become the IBF middleweight champion after defeating Segundo Mercado, in their second fight after their first ended in a draw, and successfully defend his title 19 times. In 2001 he would also become the WBC middleweight champion after defeating Keith Holmes and WBA after Félix Trinidad defending both titles 8 and 7 times respectively. He also would later add the WBO middleweight title to his resume after defeating Oscar De La Hoya in 2004 to become the first true undisputed champion to hold all 4 major belts. As the two became two of the biggest stars in boxing, talks of a potential rematch between the two persisted over the years.

On February 2, 2002, the two fighters were part of split-site doubleheader event broadcast by HBO where Jones defeated Glen Kelly in his home state of Florida to retain his undisputed light heavyweight championship, after which Hopkins defeated Carl Daniels in his home state of Pennsylvania to retain his undisputed middleweight title. After Hopkins' victory, the two men were interviewed together and Hopkins brought up the long-awaited rematch stating "I'd Split 50–50. Come on Roy, let's do the fight by June at a reasonable catchweight.", but Jones responded that he would only do the fight with a 60–40 split in his favor and the fight never materialised.

In the mid-2000s, both Jones and Hopkins would suffer setbacks. Jones would lose three straight fights from 2004 to 2005 including consecutive knockout losses to Antonio Tarver and Glen Johnson in 2004, with the third being a unanimous decision loss to Tarver in October 2005, while Hopkins would lose two consecutive fights to Jermain Taylor in 2005. Hopkins would then move up to the light heavyweight division where he would defeat Tarver to capture the IBO and The Ring light heavyweight titles in 2006. Hopkins successfully defended The Ring title against Ronald "Winky" Wright in 2007, but dropped it to the undefeated Joe Calzaghe in 2008. Jones, who had rebounded from his three-fight losing streak to win his next three, would then challenge Calzaghe later in 2008, but would lose by a lopsided unanimous decision.

Finally in September 2009, Hopkins and Jones would finally agree to a rematch set for early 2010. The deal was contingent on Jones first defeating Danny Green on December 2, while Hopkins chose to face Enrique Ornelas in an interim bout also scheduled for December 2. Hopkins would easily defeat Ornelas by a lopsided unanimous decision, but Jones was knocked out in the first round by Green after only two minutes, putting his fight with Hopkins in jeopardy. On February 1, however, both fighters formally announced that their long-awaited rematch would take place on April 3, 2010.

== The fight ==
Hopkins would dominate most of the fight as Jones had a difficult time with Hopkins' defense and did not land much sustained offense, throwing only 274 punches and landing only 82 of them. Though Hopkins was the clear aggressor, he also had trouble with his offense despite throwing over 300 more punches than Jones, landing only 180 of his 526 thrown punches.

The fight was not without controversy as Hopkins was knocked down three times as a result of fouls from Jones. The first occurred at the end of round six as Jones landed an illegal punch to the back of Hopkins head. Hopkins crumpled to the mat clutching his head and the match was stopped for three minutes to allow Hopkins to recuperate, while Jones was docked a point for his foul. When the match resumed with 10 seconds left, Hopkins backed up Jones into the corner and unleashed a flurry of punches as Jones attempted to cover up. When the bell rang, the two continued to fight while referee Tony Weeks and security entered the ring to separate the two. In the eighth round and tenth rounds, Hopkins dropped to a knee after Jones landed a rabbit-punch and a low-blow respectively, but no points were deducted for either foul.

When the fight went to the judge's scorecards, Hopkins was named the winner by unanimous decision with one score of 118–109 and two scores of 117–110.

== Aftermath ==
The fight failed to find an audience and only attracted around 150,000 pay-per-view buys. In addition, the fight was heavily criticized. Dan Rafael of ESPN called the bout an "abomination" and a "horrible fight" and called for both fighters to retire.

ESPN reported 6,792 fans attended the event, with some tickets being 'discounted' or even 'free'. According to Kevin Iole or Yahoo Sports, the contract stipulated that the first $3.5 million in profits would go to Golden Boy Promotions and Hopkins. The profits from the PPV distribution and ticket sales likely did not exceed $3.5 million, which meant Jones did not get paid a purse for the fight.

== Undercard ==
Confirmed bouts:

== Broadcasting ==
Country	Broadcaster
Australia	Main Event
Mexico	Televisa

Preceded by vs. Enrique Ornelas	Bernard Hopkins's bouts 3 April 2010	Succeeded by vs. Jean Pascal
Preceded by vs. Danny Green	Roy Jones Jr.'s bouts 3 April 2010	Succeeded by vs. Denis Lebedev
