= Antonio Tarver vs. Roy Jones Jr. III =

Boxing competition

No Excuses
- Date: October 1, 2005
- Venue: Ice Palace, Tampa, Florida, U.S.
- Title(s) on the line: IBO and The Ring light heavyweight titles

Tale of the tape
Boxer	Antonio Tarver	Roy Jones Jr.
Nickname	The Magic Man	Junior
Hometown	Orlando, Florida, U.S.	Pensacola, Florida, U.S.
Purse	$4,000,000	$4,000,000
Pre-fight record	23–3 (18 KO)	49–3 (38 KO)
Age	36 years, 10 months	36 years, 8 months
Height	6 ft 2 in (188 cm)	5 ft 11 in (180 cm)
Weight	175 lb (79 kg)	173 lb (78 kg)
Style	Southpaw	Orthodox
Recognition	IBO, and The Ring; Light Heavyweight Champion; IBF; No. 5 Ranked Light Heavyweight; The Ring No. 10 ranked pound-for-pound fighter	WBC; No. 4 Ranked Light Heavyweight; The Ring; No. 3 Ranked Light Heavyweight; 4-division world champion

Result
- Tarver wins via 12-round unanimous decision (116-112, 116-112, 117-111)

Antonio Tarver vs. Roy Jones Jr. III, billed as No Excuses, was a professional boxing match contested on October 1, 2005 for Tarver's IBO and The Ring light heavyweight championships.

The fight's bill comes from a remark made by Tarver to Jones at center ring after the referees' instructions before the second fight. The referee asked both fighters, as is customary, if they had any questions, and Tarver stated: "Yeah, I got a question. You got any excuses tonight, Roy?"

== Background ==
Tarver and Jones had fought each other twice in the previous two years. The first match took place on November 8, 2003 with Jones returning to the light heavyweight division after winning the WBA heavyweight title in his previous bout. Jones was able to narrowly defeat Tarver by majority decision to recapture the WBC light heavyweight title (which Tarver had won earlier in the year after Jones vacated it following his heavyweight title victory) and retain the WBA (Super), IBO and The Ring light heavyweight titles that he still held. The two fighters would have a rematch the following year on May 15, 2004. This time, Tarver would pick up the victory by second round knockout, becoming the first person to knock out Jones in his professional career. Jones attempted to rebound from his knockout loss to Tarver by challenging Glen Johnson for the IBF light heavyweight title, but Johnson dominated Jones for most of the fight before knocking out Jones brutally in the ninth. Tarver would then face Johnson twice, losing the first fight by a split decision, but then winning the second fight by unanimous decision to regain the IBO and The Ring titles. After Tarver's victory over Johnson, a third fight between him and Jones was made for October 1, 2005. Unlike the previous two fights, the WBA and WBC light heavyweight titles were not on the line. After winning the titles from Jones in the second fight, Tarver was stripped of both titles for choosing to face Johnson (who was also stripped of his IBF title) rather than face mandatory challenger Paul Briggs.

== The fight ==
Tarver served as the aggressor for nearly the entire fight as Jones kept his distance and simply did not mount enough offense. There were no knockdowns in the fight, but Tarver came close to scoring one over Jones in the eleventh round. Tarver spent the first minute wildly throwing punches at Jones, who covered up and clinched Tarver. After the referee ordered a break, Tarver landed a right hook to Jones' head that left him severely stunned. Sensing an opportunity at a knockout victory, Tarver quickly attacked Jones, who was now against the ropes, with a left uppercut, but Tarver's momentum sent him over the ropes and nearly out of the ring. Jones retreated but Tarver quickly followed up with a 25-second flurry of punches in an effort to score the knockdown, Jones survived as Tarver soon tired from throwing so many punches. Jones then turned the tables and stalked towards the exhausted Tarver who was able to dodge most of Jones' attempts and both men were able to survive the round.

Ultimately, Tarver, landed a substantial amount of power punches and combinations and both threw and landed more punches (107 of 341) than Jones. Jones landed a higher percentage of his punches with a 36% success rate, but landed only 74 of his 207 thrown punches. All three judges scored the fight in favor of Tarver, who won with two scores of 116–112 and one score of 117–111. Unofficial HBO judge Harold Lederman scored the fight 116–112 for Tarver, while ESPN scored the fight 118–111 for Tarver.

== Aftermath ==
Speaking after the bout Tarver said, "Roy was sharp, it was like playing chess. It was a chess game, and one mistake and I'm checkmated. The guy had resilience. You all thought I was one-punch happy, but I passed my test tonight. I did my homework."

== Undercard ==
Confirmed bouts:

Winner	Loser	Weight division/title belt(s) disputed	Result
(United States) Andre Ward	(United States) Glenn LaPlante	Middleweight (6 rounds)	1st round KO
(United States) Nate Campbell	(Kyrgyzstan) Almazbek Raiymkulov	Lightweight (10 rounds)	10th round TKO
(United States) Brian Minto	(United States) Vinny Maddalone	Heavyweight (10 rounds)	7th round TKO
Non-TV bouts
(United States) Rodney Jones	(Guyana) Raul Frank	IBF Light middleweight title eliminator	Split draw
(United States) Lance Whitaker	(United States) Gabe Brown	Heavyweight (10 rounds)	5th round TKO
(United States) Malachy Farrell	(Puerto Rico) Joseph Kenneth Reyes	Heavyweight (6 rounds)	4th round TKO
(United States) Andre Berto	(United States) William Johnson	Light middleweight (4 rounds)	1st round KO
(United States) Mickey Bey	(United States) Lamont Sims	Lightweight (4 rounds)	1st round TKO
(United States) Cortez Bey	(United States) Masresha Baye	Lightweight (4 rounds)	3rd round TKO
(United States) Hervey Medina	(United States) Anthony Concepcion	Welterweight (4 rounds)	4th round TKO

== Broadcasting ==
Country	Broadcaster
Hungary	Sport 1
United States	HBO

Preceded by vs. Glen Johnson II	Antonio Tarver's bouts 1 October 2005	Succeeded by vs. Bernard Hopkins
Preceded by vs. Glen Johnson	Roy Jones, Jr.'s bouts 1 October 2005	Succeeded by vs. Prince Badi Ajamu
