= Roy Jones Jr. vs. Glen Johnson =

Boxing competition

Glen Johnson vs. Roy Jones Jr.
- Date: September 25, 2004
- Venue: FedExForum, Memphis, Tennessee, U.S.
- Title(s) on the line: IBF light heavyweight title

Tale of the tape
Boxer	Glen Johnson	Roy Jones Jr.
Nickname	The Road Warrior	Junior
Hometown	Clarendon, Middlesex, Jamaica	Pensacola, Florida, U.S.
Purse	$700,000	$3,000,000
Pre-fight record	40–9–2 (27 KO)	49–2 (38 KO)
Age	35 years, 8 months	35 years, 8 months
Height	5 ft 9 in (175 cm)	5 ft 11 in (180 cm)
Weight	174 lb (79 kg)	175 lb (79 kg)
Style	Orthodox	Orthodox
Recognition	IBF; Light Heavyweight Champion; The Ring; No. 3 Ranked Light Heavyweight	IBF; No. 3 Ranked Light Heavyweight; The Ring; No. 1 Ranked Light Heavyweight; The Ring No. 4 ranked pound-for-pound fighter 4-division world champion

Result
- Johnson wins via 9th-round KO

Glen Johnson vs. Roy Jones Jr. was a professional boxing match contested on September 25, 2004 for the IBF light heavyweight championship.

== Background ==
In his previous fight, then-WBA and WBC Roy Jones Jr. was soundly defeated for the first time in his professional career after being knocked out in the second round of his rematch with Antonio Tarver on May 15, 2004 (his only other loss had been by disqualification in 1997). Hoping to quickly rebound from his defeat, Jones secured a match with IBF light heavyweight champion Glen Johnson in an effort to regain the IBF title he had held from 1999 to 2003. Johnson had been a journeyman fighter through most of his professional career and though he had nine losses on his record, he nevertheless was able to land an IBF light heavyweight title match against Clinton Woods. The two fighters fought to a draw in their first fight on November 7, 2003, but Johnson was able to pick up the unanimous decision victory in the second. Despite his status as champion, Johnson came into the fight as an overwhelming underdog with Jones being a 6–1 favorite by the time of the fight.

== The fight ==
Johnson would dominate Jones for much of the fight, serving as the aggressor for the duration of the fight and constantly having Jones on the defensive against the ropes. Johnson would connect with 118 of his 437 thrown punches while Jones, though landing at a slightly higher percentage (28% to Johnson's 27%), only threw 270 punches, 75 of which landed. The fight would come to an end 48 seconds into round nine. Johnson connected with a strong overhand right followed by a short left hook that dropped Jones to the canvas where the back of his head hit the canvas hard. Jones was knocked out cold and was counted out by the referee. He would remain on his back for nearly 15 minutes before finally exiting the ring with help from his trainers.

== Aftermath ==
Johnson's upset victory over Jones propelled the previously little-known fighter into the national spotlight and talks of a unification bout with Tarver began almost immediately after his fight with Jones. The two agreed to a match set for December 18, 2004, but both the WBC and IBF refused to sanction the bout as each man was contractually bound to face mandatory challengers, Paul Briggs and Rico Hoye respectively. As a result, both Tarver and Johnson forfeited their titles and proceeded on with their scheduled match, with only Tarver's IBO and The Ring light heavyweight titles on the line. For the second straight match, Johnson would pull off an upset victory, defeating Tarver by split decision to become the new The Ring light heavyweight champion. Tarver, however, would regain the titles after defeating Johnson by unanimous decision in their rematch on June 18, 2005.

After two consecutive knockout losses, some, including the two men responsible for his defeats, Johnson and Tarver, called for Jones to retire. Jones, however, decided against retirement and returned after a year–long absence to challenge Tarver in a third match on October 1, 2005. Though Jones would fare better than his previous two fights, he nevertheless lost his third consecutive fight after Tarver was rewarded with the unanimous decision victory.

== Undercard ==
Confirmed bouts:

Winner	Loser	Weight division/title belt(s) disputed	Result
(Mexico) Iván Hernández	(United States) Mark Johnson	WBO World Junior bantamweight title	8th-round KO
Non-TV bouts
(Mexico) Saúl Montana	(United States) Gabe Brown	Heavyweight (10 rounds)	Unanimous decision
(United States) John Johnson	(United States) Martin Verdin	Light heavyweight (4 rounds)	Unanimous decision
(United States) Lamont Peterson	(United States) Nicholas Dean	Light welterweight (4 rounds)	1st-round TKO
(United States) Anthony Peterson	(United States) Toris Smith	Middleweight (4 rounds)	1st-round TKO
(United States) Julian Townsend	(United States) Monyette Flowers	Middleweight (4 rounds)	Unanimous decision
(United States) Kevin Hudgins	(United States) Leshaun Blair	Bantamweight (4 rounds)	Unanimous decision
(United States) Cristy Nickel	(United States) Kimberly Catlena	Light welterweight (4 rounds)	1st-round TKO
(United States) Mario Lacey	(United States) Donnell Logan	Lightweight (4 rounds)	2nd-round KO
(United States) Charles Ellis	(United States) Clinton Whitehead	Hreavyweight (4 rounds)	1st-round KO
(United States) Rayonta Whitfield	(United States) Lamont Lindsey	Bantamweight (4 rounds)	Unanimous decision

== Broadcasting ==
The event was broadcast on HBO in the United States under the HBO World Championship Boxing banner, which is also the network's first boxing telecast broadcast in high-definition television. The telecast was preceded by a rebroadcast of the previous week's Bernard Hopkins vs. Oscar De La Hoya bout.

Country	Broadcaster
United States	HBO

Preceded by vs. Clinton Woods	Glen Johnson's bouts 25 September 2004	Succeeded by vs. Antonio Tarver
Preceded by vs. Antonio Tarver II	Roy Jones Jr.'s bouts 25 September 2004	Succeeded by vs. Antonio Tarver III
Awards
Previous: Wladimir Klitschko vs. Corrie Sanders	The Ring Upset of the Year; 2004	Next: Erik Morales vs. Zahir Raheem
