= Roy Jones Jr. =

American boxer (born 1969)

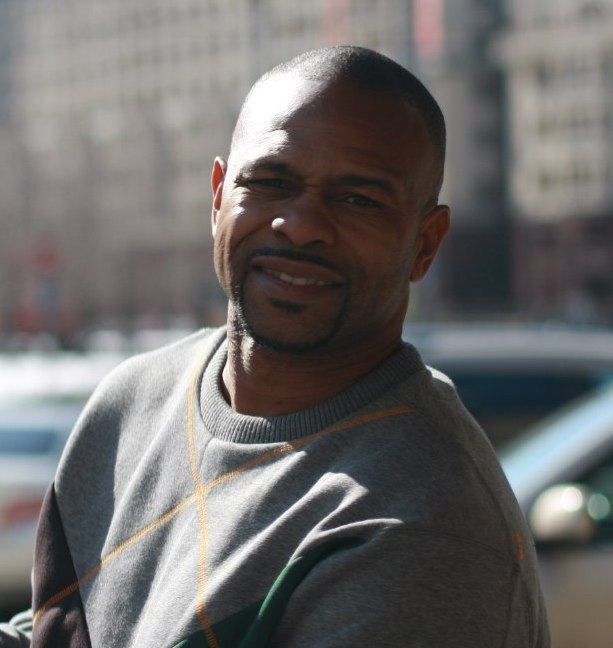
- Jones in 2012

Personal information
- Nicknames: Superman; Junior; RJ; Captain Hook
- Nationality: American; Russian
- Born: Roy Levesta Jones Jr. January 16, 1969 (age 57) Pensacola, Florida, U.S.
- Height: 5 ft 11 in (180 cm)
- Weight: Middleweight; Super middleweight; Light heavyweight; Cruiserweight; Heavyweight

Boxing career
- Reach: 74 in (188 cm)
- Stance: Orthodox

Boxing record
- Total fights: 76
- Wins: 66
- Win by KO: 47
- Losses: 10
Medal record
Men's amateur boxing
Representing United States
Olympic Games
Silver medal – second place	1988 Seoul	Light middleweight
Golden Gloves
Gold medal – first place	1986 Iowa	Light Welterweight
Gold medal – first place	1987 Tennessee	Light Middleweight
Bronze medal – third place	1988 Nebraska	Light Middleweight
National Junior Olympics
Gold medal – first place	1984 Florida	Bantamweight
Goodwill Games
Silver medal – second place	1986 Moscow	Light welterweight

Roy Levesta Jones Jr. (born January 16, 1969) is an American former professional boxer who competed professionally from 1989 to 2018 and returned to the ring in 2023. He won world championships across four weight divisions: middleweight, super middleweight, light heavyweight and heavyweight. As an amateur, he represented the United States at the 1988 Summer Olympics, where he won the silver medal in the light middleweight division.

Widely regarded as one of the greatest pound for pound boxers in history, Jones achieved a landmark accomplishment in 2003 by capturing the World Boxing Association (WBA) heavyweight title. He became the first and only boxer to win a heavyweight championship after beginning his professional career as a junior middleweight. The achievement also made him the second former middleweight champion to capture a heavyweight title, following Bob Fitzsimmons, who had accomplished the feat 106 years earlier. Additionally, he is one of only two heavyweight champions to have started their careers below the middleweight division. The other was former welterweight champion Tommy Burns, who won the heavyweight title 97 years earlier. Consequently, Jones is the second-lightest boxer to have become heavyweight champion.

Between 1999 and 2002, Jones held the undisputed light heavyweight championship (Note: Three-belt era: World Boxing Association (WBA), World Boxing Council (WBC) and International Boxing Federation (IBF) titles.). As of June 2026, he holds the record for the most victories in unified light heavyweight title bouts, with twelve. He also became the first fighter in CompuBox history to prevent an opponent from landing a punch throughout an entire round. Jones received numerous accolades throughout his career. The Ring magazine named him Fighter of the Year in 1994, while the World Boxing Hall of Fame awarded him the same distinction in 2003. He also won the Best Boxer ESPY Award three times, in 1996, 2000 and 2003. In recognition of his achievements during the 1990s, the Boxing Writers Association of America and The Sporting News named him Fighter of the Decade.

== Early life ==
Roy Levesta Jones Jr. was born on January 16 1969 in Pensacola, Florida, into a family with a boxing background. His father, Roy Jones Sr., was a Vietnam War veteran who received the Bronze Star for valor after rescuing another soldier. He had also competed as a middleweight boxer before pursuing a career as an aircraft engineer and later taking up hog farming.

Jones's parents had contrasting approaches to raising him. His mother, Carol, was described as warm and easy-going, while his father maintained a strict and often aggressive manner toward his son. Roy Sr. operated a boxing gym, dedicating much of his time and financial resources to training young fighters and providing opportunities for troubled youths. Roy Sr. subjected Jones to demanding training sessions, frequently reprimanded him in front of other fighters and used verbal and physical punishment as part of his approach to training.

Jones recalled that his childhood was characterized by fear of his father, describing repeated verbal abuse, intimidation and physical violence. He described his upbringing through the imagery of the birds kept by his father, comparing his childhood to living in a cage. He stated that he felt unable to fully express his individuality while under his father's control, but believed that the experience had shaped his ability to endure adversity. In the same interview, he reflected: "I spent all my life in my dad's cage. I could never be 100 percent of who I am until I left it. But because of him, nothing bothers me. I'll never face anything stronger and harder than what I already have." Reflecting on the psychological toll, Jones recalled experiencing such persistent distress that he had contemplated suicide as a child.

== Amateur career ==
Jones won the 1984 United States National Junior Olympics in the 119 lb (54 kg) weight division, the 1986 United States National Golden Gloves in the 139 lb (63 kg) division, and the 1987 United States National Golden Gloves in the 156 lb (71 kg) division. As an amateur, he ended his career with a 121–13 record.

=== Highlights ===
(gold) National Golden Gloves (139 lbs), Cedar Rapids, Iowa, May 9–10, 1986:
- 1/2: Defeated Derrick Rolon by decision
- Finals: Defeated Victor Levine by decision

Goodwill Box-offs (156 lbs), Caesars Tahoe, Lake Tahoe, Nevada, April 12, 1986:

- Defeated Stanley Longstreet

(silver) Goodwill Games (139 lbs), Moscow, Soviet Union, July 5–20, 1986:

- 1/4: Defeated Gordon Joyce (Ireland) by unanimous decision, 5–0
- 1/2: Lost to Igor Ruzhnikov (Soviet Union) by majority decision, 1–4

(gold) National Golden Gloves (156 lbs), Knoxville, Tennessee, April 17–18, 1987:

- 1/8: Defeated Anthony Daley
- 1/4: Defeated George Calderon
- 1/2: Defeated Donald Giron by decision
- Finals: Defeated Ray McElroy by decision

Junior World Championships (156 lbs), Havana, Cuba, June 26, 1987:

- 1/8: Lost to Andy Liebing (East Germany) by majority decision, 1–4

U.S. National Championships (156 lbs), Olympic Sports Center, Colorado Springs, Colorado, March 29, 1988:

- 1/8: Lost to Frank Liles by split decision, 2–3

National Golden Gloves (156 lbs), Omaha, Nebraska, May 16–20, 1988:

- 1/4: Defeated Hiskia Swartz by walkover
- 1/2: Lost to Gerald McClellan by split decision, 2–3

Olympic Trials (156 lbs), Concord Pavilion, Concord, California, July 5–10, 1988:

- 1/4: Defeated James Crisp by unanimous decision, 5–0
- 1/2: Defeated Ray McElroy by majority decision, 4–1
- Finals: Defeated Frank Liles by split decision, 3–2

Olympic Box-offs (156 lbs), Caesars Palace, Las Vegas, Nevada, July 16, 1988:

=== Olympic results ===
"When Jones picks up the action, he starts to look like Sugar Ray Leonard, his hands are down, he's taunting, he is offering his face, and then dancing away as Woodhall tries to punch."

— Ferdie Pacheco on Jones' performance at the Olympic semifinals.

Jones represented the United States at the 1988 Seoul Olympic Games in the 156-pound weight class, being the youngest member of the U.S. Olympic Boxing Team, where he won the silver medal.

- 1/16: Defeated M'tendere Makalamba (Malawi) KO 1 (1:44)
- 1/8: Defeated Michal Franek (Czechoslovakia) by unanimous decision, 5–0 (Franek was given a standing eight count in the 1st rd; and at the 2:33 of the 2nd rd)
- 1/4: Defeated Yevgeni Zaytsev (Soviet Union) by unanimous decision, 5–0 (Zaytsev suffered a broken nose in the 1st rd)
- 1/2: Defeated Richie Woodhall (United Kingdom) by unanimous decision, 5–0 (Woodhall suffered a broken nose in the 2nd rd)
- Finals: Lost to Park Si-hun (South Korea) by split decision, 2–3 (Park was given a standing eight count at 2:11 of the 2nd rd)

Jones did not lose a single round en route to the final. His quarterfinal match-up with Soviet boxer Yevgeni Zaytsev was the first U.S.–Soviet Olympic bout in 12 years (because each country had boycotted one Summer Olympics during that period). The final was met with controversy when Jones lost a 2–3 decision to South Korean fighter Park Si-Hun despite pummeling Park for three rounds, landing 86 punches to Park's 32. Reportedly, Park himself apologized to Jones afterward and the Italian referee Aldo Leoni, while raising Park's hand, told Jones that he was dumbstruck by the judges' decision, murmuring: "I can't believe they're doing this to you." One judge shortly thereafter admitted the decision was a mistake and all three judges voting against Jones were eventually suspended. Marv Albert, calling the bout on American television for NBC, reported that two judges from Communist countries, Hungary and the Soviet Union, scored the bout in favor of Jones, while those from Morocco and Uruguay favored Park. The fifth judge, from Uganda, scored the bout as a draw, leaving the outcome to be decided on other criteria.

An official IOC investigation ending in 1997 found that, although the offending judges had been wined and dined by South Korean organizers, there was no evidence of corruption in the boxing events in Seoul. Jones was awarded the Val Barker trophy as the best stylistic boxer of the 1988 games, which was only the third and to this day the last time in the competition's history when the award did not go to one of the gold medal winners. The Val Barker trophy is awarded by the AIBA, an organization not directly connected with the Olympic authorities. The incident led Olympic organizers to establish a new scoring system for Olympic boxing.

The U.S. Olympic Committee called for an investigation in 1996 after documents belonging to East Germany's Stasi secret police revealed reports of judges being paid to vote for South Korean boxers. East Germany ended the Seoul Olympics in second place on the medal table, ahead of the United States by one gold medal.

Jones and Park met face to face in May 2023, with the South Korean boxer giving his Olympic gold medal over to Jones as a gesture of justice over the controversy.

== Professional career ==
=== Early career ===
On turning professional, he had already sparred with many professional boxers, including NABF Champion Ronnie Essett, IBF Champion Lindell Holmes and Sugar Ray Leonard. Jones began as a professional on May 6, 1989, knocking out Ricky Randall in two rounds in Pensacola at the Bayfront Auditorium. For his next fight, he faced the more experienced Stephan Johnson in Atlantic City, beating him by a knockout in round eight.

Jones built a record of 15–0 with 15 knockouts before stepping up in class to meet former World Welterweight Champion Jorge Vaca in a Pay Per View fight on January 10, 1992. He knocked Vaca out in round one to reach 16 knockout wins in a row. After one more KO, Jones went the distance for the first time against future world champion Jorge Castro, winning a 10-round decision in front of a USA Network national audience.

=== Middleweight champion ===
==== Jones vs. Hopkins ====
Jones made his first attempt at a world title on May 22, 1993. He beat future Undisputed middleweight champion Bernard Hopkins by unanimous decision in Washington, D.C., to capture the IBF middleweight championship. Jones was ahead on all three judges' scorecards (116-112 three times). Jones landed 206 of 594 punches (35%) and Hopkins connected on 153 of 670 (23%). Jones claimed he had entered the bout with a broken right hand, but still managed to outpoint Hopkins and secure a unanimous decision win. Jones reminded the world of this claim on his hit single "Ya'll Must've Forgot" later in his career.

For his next fight, he fought another future world champion, Thulane "Sugar Boy" Malinga, in a non-title affair. Jones beat Malinga by knockout in six rounds. Jones finished the year with another win, beating Fermin Chirino by decision. In 1994, Jones beat Danny "Popeye" Garcia by knockout in six, then retained his IBF title against Thomas Tate in two rounds at Las Vegas on May 27.

=== Super middleweight champion ===
==== Jones vs. Toney ====
On November 18, 1994, Jones was set to face undefeated IBF super middleweight Champion James Toney, who was ranked highly in the "pound for pound" rankings. Toney was undefeated after 46 bouts and was rated the best in the world at 168 lbs. Billed as "The Uncivil War", Toney vs. Jones was heavily hyped and on PPV. Jones, for the first time in his career, was the underdog.

Over the course of the 12-round unanimous decision, Jones demonstrated his greatness. He danced circles around Toney, utilizing his speed and athleticism to dictate the action, and landing quick combinations whenever Toney pressured him. Jones scored a flash knockdown in the third round with a leaping left hook after goading Toney by imitating a fighting cock. Ring magazine called Jones' performance the most dominant of any big fight in 20 years. Jones landed 285 of 614 punches (46%) and Toney connected on 157 of 451 (35%). Jones was ahead on all three judges' scorecards (117–110, 119–108 and 118–109). The fight generated 300,000 pay-per-view buys.

==== Miscellaneous defenses ====
In 1995, Jones defended his super middleweight title successfully multiple times. He began the year by knocking out IBF #1 Antoine Byrd in round one. This was the first time a championship fight took place at Pensacola. In a fight billed as 'The Devil & Mr Jones', he faced former IBF lightweight Champion Vinny Pazienza and defeated him in round six, after knocking down Pazienza three times. In the fourth round, Jones became the first fighter in CompuBox history to go an entire round without being hit by his opponent. Pazienza was credited with throwing five punches and landing zero. Pazienza was guaranteed $1.35 million, while Jones, who worked off percentages of the gate and the pay-per-view revenue, was guaranteed at least $2 million. Jones then beat Tony Thornton in round three by KO three months later.

In 1996, Jones maintained his winning ways, defeating Merqui Sosa by knockout in two and future world champion Eric Lucas in round 11. When he boxed Lucas, he became the first athlete to participate in two paid sports events on the same day. He had played a basketball game in the morning and defended his boxing title in Jacksonville, Florida that evening. He also held a press conference in the ring just before his 3rd bout of the year, taking questions from a chair in the middle of the ring and defending his choice of Bryant Brannon as his opponent instead of Frankie Liles, his nemesis from the amateurs. He then defeated Bryant Brannon in a round two TKO.

=== First reign as light heavyweight champion ===
==== Jones vs McCallum ====
In November 1996 at Ice Palace, Tampa, Florida, Jones defeated 40-year-old former three-weight world champion Mike McCallum via a shutout decision (120–107, 3 times) before a crowd of 12,000, to win the vacant Interim WBC Light Heavyweight title. Jones scored a knockdown just before the bell at the end of round 10. Jones landed 254 of 535 punches (47%) throughout the 12 rounds and McCallum connected on 209 of 651 (32%) Jones was soon upgraded to full champion by the WBC when former titlist Fabrice Tiozzo moved up to cruiserweight. Jones made $2.8 million from the fight and McCallum got $750,000.

==== Jones vs. Griffin ====
In 1997 Jones had his first professional loss, a disqualification against Montell Griffin (26–0, 18 KOs) at the Taj Majal Hotel & Casino in Atlantic City, New Jersey. Griffin was trained by the legendary Eddie Futch, who had taught him how to take advantage of Jones technical mistakes and lack of basic boxing fundamentals. Griffin jumped out to an early lead on Jones but by round 9 Jones was ahead on the scorecards by a point and had Griffin on the canvas early in round nine. But as Griffin took a knee on the canvas to avoid further punishment, Jones hit him twice. Subsequently, Jones was disqualified and lost his title. At the time of disqualification, Jones was ahead on two of the judges' scorecards (75–76, 77–75, 76–75).

=== Second reign as light heavyweight champion ===
==== Jones vs. Griffin II ====
Jones sought an immediate rematch five months later at Foxwoods Resort, Connecticut, US, and regained the World Light Heavyweight title easily, knocking Griffin down within the first 20 seconds of the fight, then ending the fight by knocking Griffin out 2 minutes and 31 seconds in with a leaping left hand shot. The fight took place in a bingo hall before a sellout crowd of 4,500. Both Jones and Griffin earned a $1.5 million purse.

=== Heavyweight ambitions ===
Jones was linked to his WBC mandatory Michael Nunn after regaining the title, however in November he opted to vacate his belt in order to move up to heavyweight with a $6,000,000 deal to face former undisputed champion Buster Douglas on the table. Ultimately however Jones's father convinced him to stay at light heavyweight, telling him he was "risking his life" by fighting Douglas. Instead Jones signed to fight former light heavyweight champion Virgil Hill at a 177 1/2 lb catchweight. He would also be named the WBC's light heavyweight "champion in recess".

Jones would become the first man to knockout Hill, stopping him in the 4th round with a huge right hand to the body that broke one of Hill's ribs.

=== Third reign as light heavyweight champion ===
Jones would next sign to challenge WBA light heavyweight champion Lou Del Valle. Del Valle, a former sparring partner to Jones, had won the WBA belt in September 1997 (which had been vacated by Lineal champion Dariusz Michalczewski in July) by stopping Eddy Smulders of the Netherlands in the eighth round. Despite its billing as a unification bout, Jones was not recognized as the full WBC champion, that being Graciano Rocchigiani

Jones would win against Del Valle, by a decision in 12 on July 18, to became a three-time champion. Jones had to climb off the canvas for the first time in his career, as he was dropped in round eight, but continued to outbox Del Valle throughout the rest of the fight and gained a unanimous decision.

By October the WBC had demoted its light heavyweight champion Rocchigiani to an "interim champion" after inexplicably claiming its references in promotions and contracts to the Rocchigiani-Nunn fight as a championship bout, and to Rocchigiani as the champion in its rankings, had been "typographical errors". As a consequence Jones was elevated by the WBC to their full champion, making him a unified light heavyweight champion.

=== Unified light heavyweight champion ===
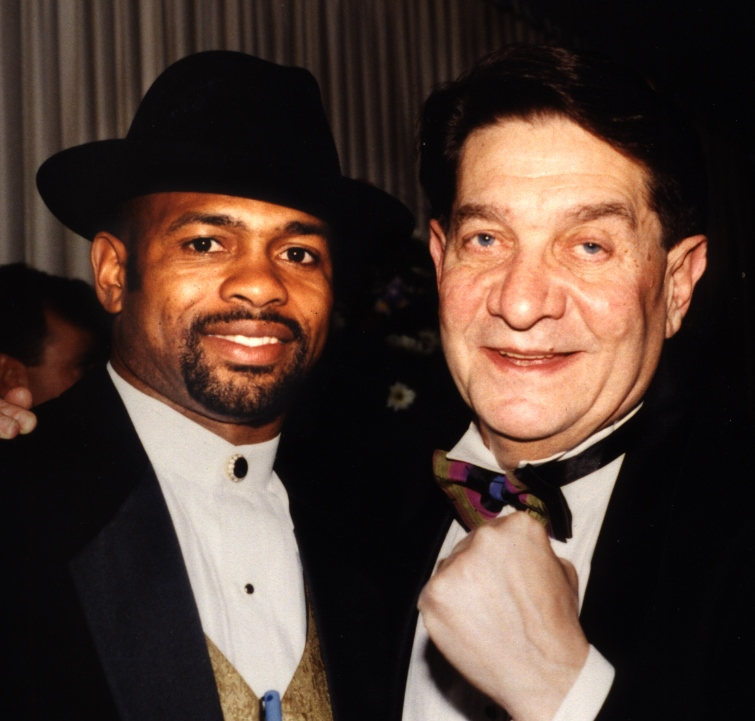
Jones with Fred Levin, 2002

Jones would next make a defense against Otis Grant. He retained the crown by knocking Grant out in ten rounds.

Jones began 1999 by knocking out the WBC number one ranked contender at the time, Rick Frazier a 39 year old New York City police officer promoted by Don King.

=== Undisputed light heavyweight champion ===
On June 5 of that year, Jones beat IBF champion Reggie Johnson by a lopsided 12-round decision to become the undisputed light heavyweight champion, as well as the first to unify the WBA, WBC and IBF titles at that weight since Michael Spinks in 1983. Jones dropped Johnson in the first round and hard in the third round but backed off and allowed Reggie to finish the fight.

A match with Graciano Rocchigiani was scheduled for November 1999 after Rocchigiani filed a lawsuit against Jones' promotional companies M&M Sports and Square Ring Promotions Inc due to Jones' reluctance to box Rocchigiani. However, the match was canceled by Jones' promoter Murad Muhammad after Rocchigiani missed a press conference. After initially threatening to strip Jones of his title if he didn't arrange another match with Rocchigiani, the WBC stripped Rocchigiani outright.

In November he would also be awarded the vacant IBO belt.

The year 2000 began with Jones easily beating the hard-punching David Telesco via a 12-round decision on January 15 at Radio City Music Hall to retain his titles, which was also the first fight hosted at the venue. Jones reportedly fractured his wrist a few weeks before the bout and fought almost exclusively one-handed. He also entered the ring to a live performance of "Da Rockwilder" by rappers Method Man and Redman. His next fight was also a first-time boxing event for a venue, as he traveled to Indianapolis and retained his title with an 11-round technical knockout over Richard Hall at the Conseco Fieldhouse. Jones ended 2000 with a 10-round stoppage of undefeated Eric Harding in New Orleans.

In 2001, Jones released Round One: The Album, a rap CD. That year he retained the title against Derrick Harmon by a knockout in ten and against future world champion Julio César González of Mexico by a 12-round unanimous decision before a crowd of 20,409. The three judges scored it (119–106, 118–107, 119–106) all for Jones. Jones knocked Gonzalez down in rounds one, five and twelve and earned a $1.5 million purse. Jones landed 192 of 375 punches (51%) whilst Gonzalez connected on a very low 91 of 609 (15%). Jones was awarded the World Boxing Federation's light heavyweight title on in November 2001.

In 2002, Jones retained his title by knocking out Australian boxer Glen Kelly in seven rounds. Jones put both hands behind his back. As Kelly moved in behind a jab, Jones went over the jab with a right to the head. Kelly went down and was counted out. Jones landed 124 of 249 punches (50%) and Kelly connected on 42 of 171 (25%). Before this bout, Jones was awarded The Ring Championship belt.

Jones then defeated future world champion, WBC No. 1 Clinton Woods by technical knockout before a crowd of 16,229. He performed a song from his CD during his ring entrance. The bout was stopped in round 6 after Woods' corner threw in the towel. Jones landed 140 of 300 punches (47%) and Woods connected on 39 of 166 (23%).

=== Heavyweight champion ===
==== Jones vs. Ruiz ====
On March 1, 2003, at the Thomas & Mack Center in Las Vegas, Jones defeated John Ruiz, the man who defeated an aging Evander Holyfield, for the WBA Heavyweight title in front of 15,300 fans. Jones officially weighed in at 193 lb (88 kg) and Ruiz at 226 lb (103 kg). Jones became the first former middleweight title holder to win a Heavyweight title in 106 years. Jones also became the first fighter to start his career as a light middleweight and win a heavyweight title, and the second reigning light heavyweight champion after Michael Spinks in 1985 to move up in weight and claim a major heavyweight championship in his first fight in the division. Jones was guaranteed $10 million against 60% of the profits. Ruiz had no guarantee. He received 40% of the profits, which he had to share with promoter Don King. Jones won on all three scorecards (116–112, 118–110 & 117–111). According to Mark Taffet, HBO's senior vice president of sports operations and pay-per-view, the fight generated 602,000 pay-per-view buys.

=== Return to light heavyweight ===
==== Jones vs. Tarver ====
Jones chose to return to the light heavyweight division and on November 8, 2003, he defeated Antonio Tarver to retain the IBO and The Ring Light Heavyweight Championships, win Tarver's WBC title, and win the vacant WBA (Unified) title. Jones appeared a lot weaker after coming back down to the light heavyweight division, losing the muscle he gained for the heavyweight fight seemed to have taken a toll on his aging body and his cat-like reflexes appeared diminished. Jones won by majority decision, the judges giving him 117–111, 116–112 and 114–114.

=== Fall from grace ===
==== Jones vs. Tarver II ====
On May 15, 2004, Jones faced Tarver in a rematch. Jones was heavily favored to win, but Tarver knocked him down at 1:31 of the second round. Jones had won the first round (Tarver only landed two punches in the first round), but in the second, as Jones tried a combination, he was caught by a big counter left hook from Tarver. Jones got on his feet by the count, but for the first time in his career was ruled unable to continue by referee Jay Nady.

==== Jones vs. Johnson ====
On September 25, 2004, Jones attempted to win the IBF light heavyweight title from Glen Johnson in a match in Memphis, Tennessee. Johnson knocked out Jones 49 seconds into the ninth round. Jones lay on the canvas for three minutes after being counted out. Johnson was ahead on all three judges' scorecards at the time of the knockout (77–75, 77–75, 78–74) and had landed 118 punches to Jones's 75. Jones used the ring's canvas that night as a billboard for his upcoming rap CD, which came out November 1.

==== Jones vs. Tarver III ====
After almost a year away from the ring, focusing on training and working as an analyst for HBO Boxing, Jones scheduled a third fight with Antonio Tarver, on October 1, 2005, a sellout crowd of 20,895 at the St. Pete Times Forum in Tampa, Florida, which aired on HBO PPV. For only the second time in his career, Jones was considered an underdog going into the fight.

Tarver won by unanimous decision (117–111, 116–112, 116–112) and had Jones out on his feet in the 11th round. Tarver landed 158 of 620 punches (25%) and Jones connected on 85 of 320 (27%). Despite being clearly behind from early in the contest, there was little urgency in either Jones' corner or his performance as he seemed content to make it to the end of the fight following his back-to-back knockout losses.

In the post-fight interview with ESPN's Brian Kenny, Jones said that he would like to fight again. He would welcome a fourth bout with Tarver or another duel with Johnson. The fighters earned in excess of $4 million apiece plus a share of pay-per-view revenues, with the fight generating 440,000 pay-per-view buys.

==== Fallout with HBO ====
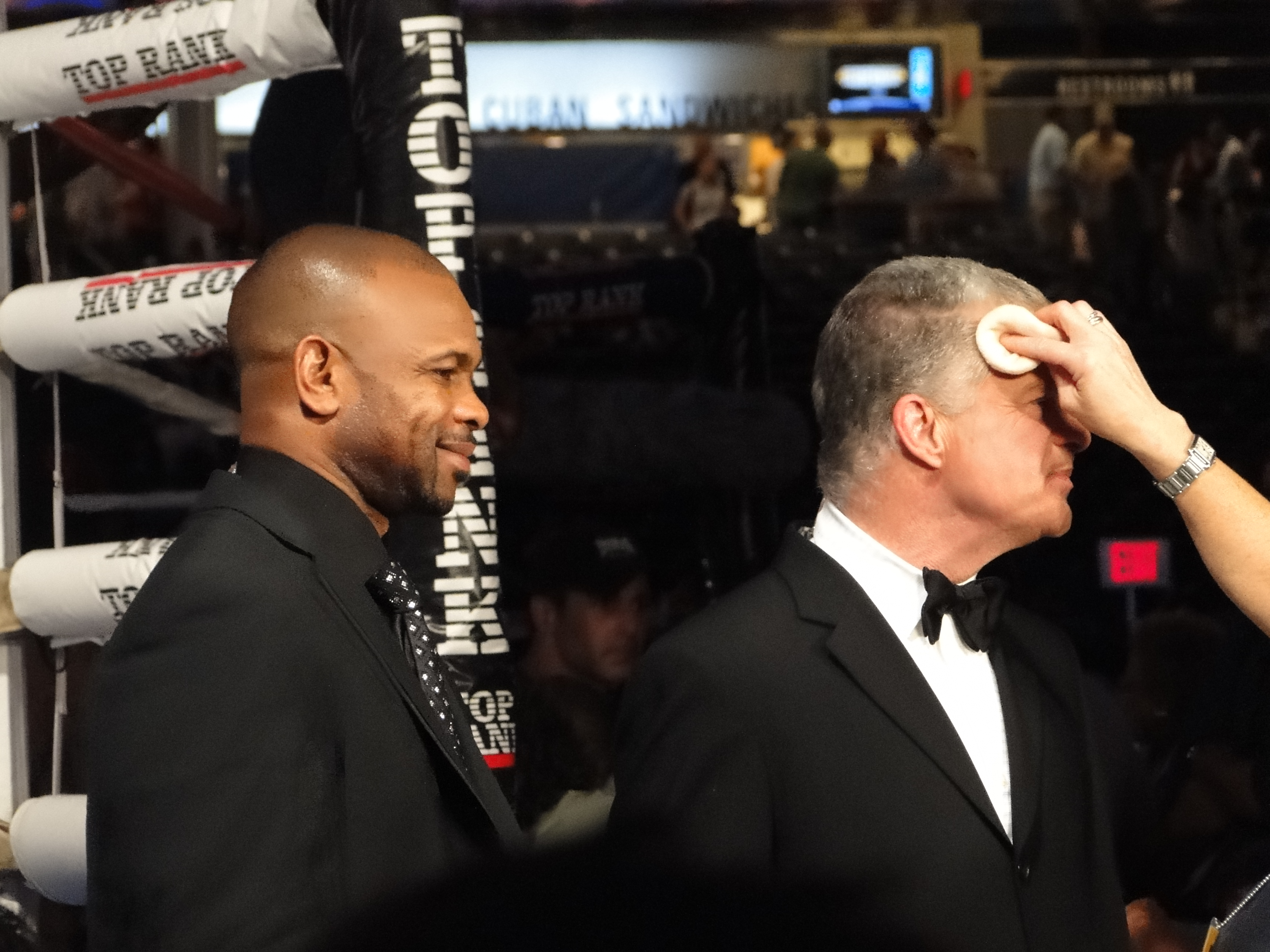
Jones with co-commentator Jim Lampley, 2010

After the loss in the third Tarver bout, Jones resumed his duties as a commentator for HBO World Championship Boxing, calling the Floyd Mayweather Jr.–Sharmba Mitchell fight on November 19, 2005, and the Jermain Taylor–Bernard Hopkins rematch on December 3, 2005. His return to the network was short-lived, as Jones was let go from his ringside analyst role in January 2006. HBO cited his reported lack of commitment to attending the network's production meetings. Jones returned as a guest analyst for several bouts in 2010, and HBO brought him back the next year as their analyst for Boxing After Dark.

=== Comeback trail ===
==== Back to winning ways ====
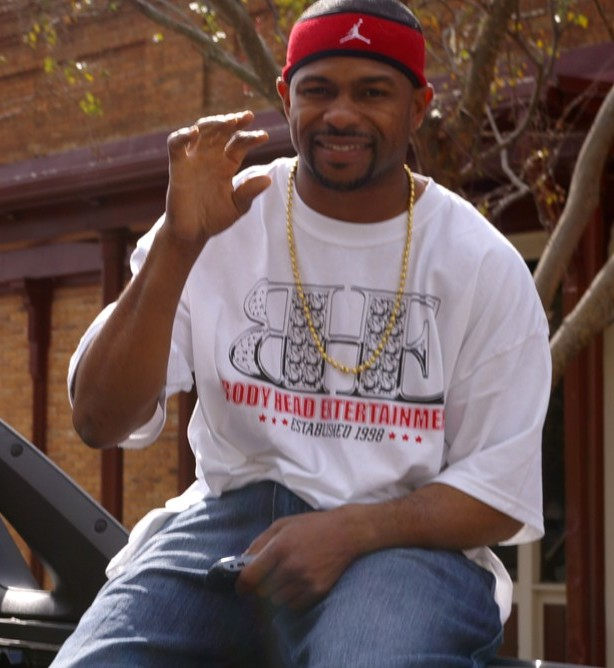
Jones in 2006

Jones took on Prince Badi Ajamu (25–2–1, 14 KOs) on July 29, 2006, at the Qwest Arena in Boise, Idaho. Jones defeated Ajamu by a unanimous decision (119–106, 3 times), winning the WBO NABO light heavyweight title. Ajamu won the first round on all three official scorecards, however it was the only round he won. Ajamu also lost two points for repeated low blows in round seven and one more in round eight.

Next up for Jones was the undefeated 29-year-old Anthony Hanshaw (24–0–1, 14 KOs), on July 14, 2007, at the Mississippi Coast Coliseum in Biloxi, Mississippi. Hanshaw was ranked 11th by the IBF at super middleweight. Hanshaw was knocked down in the 11th round. Jones won the bout by unanimous decision (114–113, 117–110, 118–109) to claim the vacant International Boxing Council light heavyweight title.

==== Jones vs. Trinidad ====
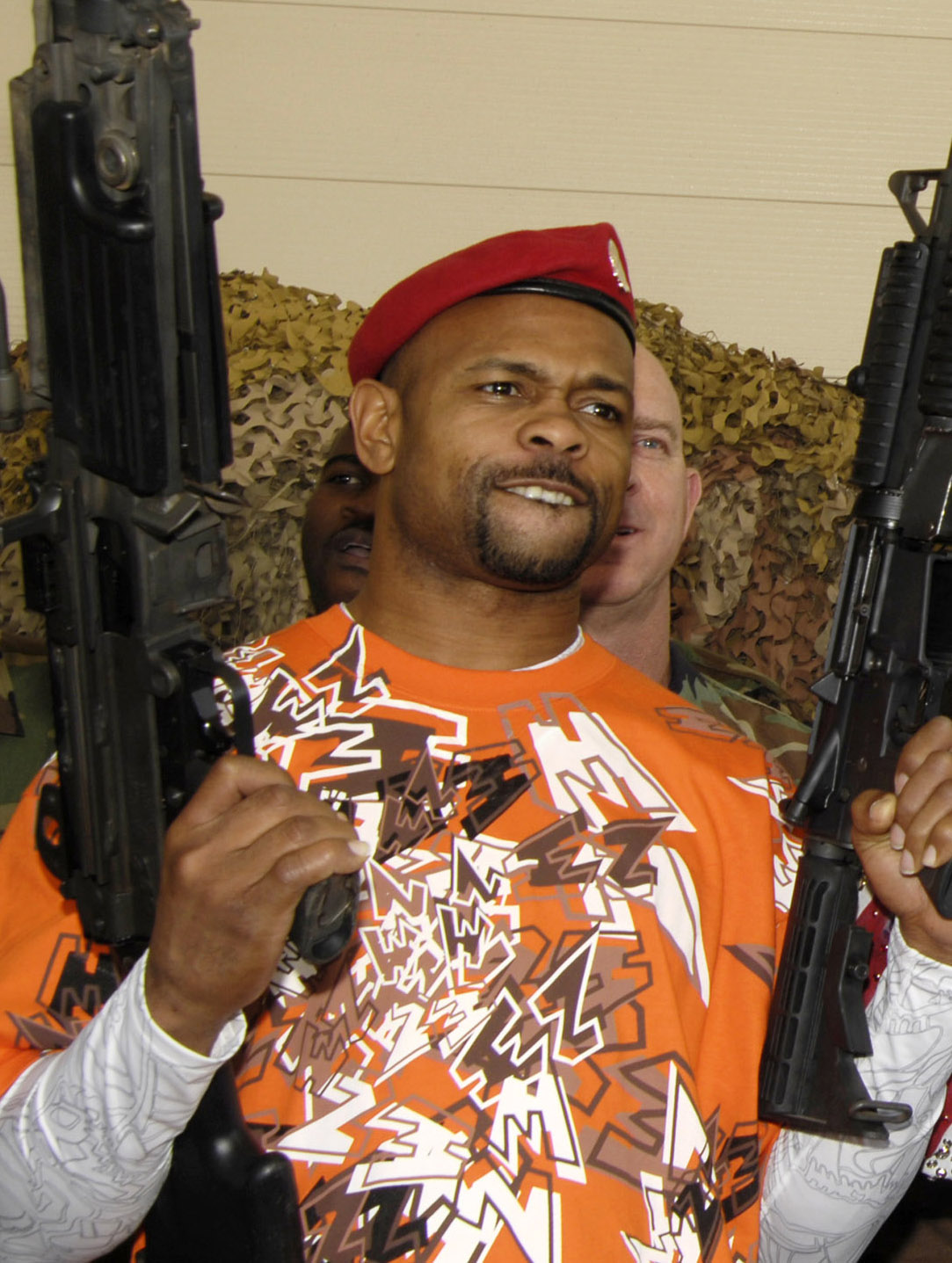
Jones promoting his fight against Trinidad, 2007

On January 19, 2008, Jones faced former three-weight world champion Félix Trinidad at Madison Square Garden in New York City. Trinidad had also won the WBA Middleweight Title by defeating then Champion William Joppy. The bout was fought at a catchweight of 170 lbs. Jones had a noticeable size and speed advantage, and in round seven, a short right hand to the temple dropped Trinidad to his knees. Jones fired a combination in the tenth round to send Trinidad down once more. Jones won the fight by scores of 117–109 and 116–110 (twice). This was the first time a former heavyweight champion returned to fight successfully at 170 lbs. The fight generated 500,000 pay-per-view buys and $25 million in domestic television revenue. This was also the last fight of Trinidad's career.

==== Jones vs. Calzaghe ====
After Joe Calzaghe's split from promoter Frank Warren, it was officially announced that Roy Jones Jr. and Joe Calzaghe had reached an agreement to fight for The Ring Light Heavyweight Championship in New York City at Madison Square Garden on September 20, 2008, on HBO PPV. However, Calzaghe claimed injury to his right hand in training, so the fight had to be postponed a couple of weeks, with November 8 being set as the new date.

In the first round, Jones caught Calzaghe with an uppercut and knocked him down, as well as cutting the Welshman on the bridge of the nose. However, Jones failed to capitalize on the knock down. In the 2nd round Calzaghe began to control the action and dominated Jones throughout the remainder of the fight. As the fight progressed Jones absorbed more and more punishment and suffered a cut over his left eye. Jones' corner, who had never seen Roy cut before, didn't know how to properly handle the situation and blood covered the left side of his face. Ultimately, Jones lost by unanimous decision, winning only one round (10–8 in the first) on the 3 official judges' cards. There was a crowd of 14,152. The fight generated 225,000 pay-per-view buys. It was reported that Calzaghe was paid $10 million from the fight. The fight aired in the UK on Setanta Sports after 4:30 am local time, peaking at 500,000 viewers.

==== Jones vs. Sheika ====
It was announced that Jones would next fight Omar Sheika (27–8, 18 KOs) on March 21, 2009, at the Civic Center, Pensacola, Florida. Jones defeated Sheika via fifth-round technical knockout to claim the vacant WBO NABO light heavyweight title. The fight was the main event of a pay-per-view titled "March Badness", which included both boxing and mixed martial arts matches. Sheika had previously defeated Glen Johnson, who had knocked out Jones in 2004 and came into this fight having lost six of his last ten bouts. It was only his second fight since September 2005. Jones came in ranked as the #6 light heavyweight in the world by The Ring.

==== Jones vs. Lacy ====
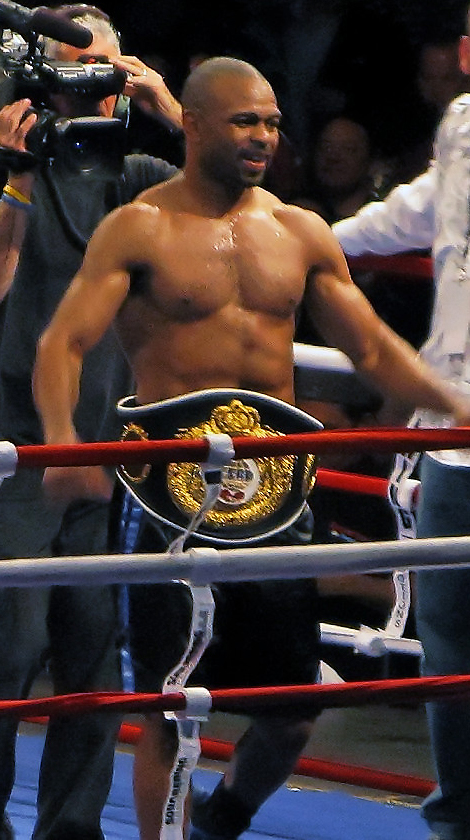
Jones celebrating his victory over Lacy, 2009

On August 15, 2009, Jones beat former super middleweight champion Jeff Lacy (25–2, 17 KOs) in 10 rounds after Lacy's corner stopped the fight. The fight, billed as "Hook City", going off the boxers' nicknames of 'Captain Hook' and 'Left Hook', took place at the Coast Coliseum in Biloxi, Mississippi. Lacy had never been knocked out or stopped before. Lacy had tried to pin Jones on the ropes throughout the fight, but Jones was unaffected by the tactic and seemed more worried about playing to the crowd than about Lacy's punches. There was a discussion in Lacy's corner after the ninth round about stopping it, but Lacy, convinced his team to give him another round. Jones landed 249 of 500 punches (50%) while Lacy connected on 104 of 429 (24%). Jones was ahead on all three judges' scorecards at the time of stoppage (99–91, 100–89, 98–92).

=== Consecutive defeats ===
==== Jones vs. Green ====
In December 2009, Roy Jones was set to face Australian boxer Danny Green in Sydney, Australia. In the weeks leading up to this fight, there were reports in the newspapers indicating difficulties getting Roy's sparring partners into Australia. Then on December 2, 2009, following an extensive pre-fight delay due to hand wrap protests, Danny Green defeated Jones via first-round TKO. Jones was initially gracious in his humbling defeat, stating that "We don't make excuses, it was a great performance by Danny." However, less than a month later, Jones would launch a formal complaint, accusing Green of using illegal hand wraps and demanding his loss be overturned, though the decision was upheld. Though Jones' rematch with Hopkins looked to be in trouble following Jones' loss, the two sides would officially come to an agreement in February 2010 for an April 3 bout.

==== Jones vs. Hopkins II ====
Roy Jones Jr. and Bernard Hopkins (50–5–1, 32 KOs) met in a rematch bout, on April 3, 2010, at the Mandalay Bay Resort & Casino in Las Vegas, 17 years after their first fight. Jones entered with a record of 5–5 in his previous ten bouts dating back to May 2004 whilst Hopkins came in 4–1 since June 2006. After going the distance, Hopkins was awarded with a unanimous decision (118–109, 117–110 twice). Hopkins landed 184 of 526 punches (35%), while Jones connected on 82 of 274 (30%). Hopkins collapsed to his knees in his dressing room, drained from a brutal fight and exhausted by the end of his 17-year wait for revenge against Jones. The fight generated 150,000 pay-per-view buys.

==== Jones vs. Lebedev ====
In February 2011, Vladimir Hryunov confirmed that negotiations were taking place for Denis Lebedev (21–1, 16 KOs) to fight Jones in Moscow. Lebedev had just come off a controversial split decision loss to Marco Huck. At the time, Lebedev was ranked #4 at cruiserweight by The Ring. On 24 March, a deal had been agreed which would see Jones earn a $500,000 purse. The fight, a 10-round bout, which was billed as the "Battle of Two Empires" was announced to take place on May 22 at Dynamo Palace of Sports in Krylatskoye. 2,000 tickets were reportedly sold on the day of release. The promoters expected a sellout.

Lebedev knocked Jones out with 2 seconds left in their 10-round bout. After round 9, the scorecards read (87–84, 85–86, 90–81). The controversy arose when Lebedev punched Jones, when it was, to some, clear that Jones was not responsive and was out on his feet. The final punch put Jones out cold on the canvas and he did not regain his senses for more than 5 minutes amid active medical help. After the bout, Lebedev said that he had nothing to be sorry about. Referee Steve Smoger was also accused of incompetence because he did not stop the fight even though Jones could no longer defend himself which led to Jones taking unnecessary damage. In a statement following the fight, Smoger said, "I didn't stop the fight because there were only a matter of seconds remaining in the fight and it seemed that Roy was pretending, trying to trick his opponent. He did this repeatedly in the fight. So I thought Jones was doing the same thing here, trying to deceive Lebedev in the final seconds of the fight in order to lure Denis in to land a big punch [which Jones managed to do in the previous round]." Jones, when asked about his feelings on the punch responded, "I forgive him".

=== Cruiserweight ===
==== Jones vs. Alexander ====
Jones won a 10-round unanimous decision against Max Alexander on December 10, 2011, in Atlanta, snapping a three-match losing streak, and winning the Universal Boxing Organisation (UBO) Intercontinental cruiserweight championship. The three judges scored the bout all in Jones' favour (100–90, 100–90 & 99–91). Jones rarely pressed over the first seven rounds but put together several combinations in the eighth and 10th rounds to beat Alexander. After the fight, Jones said, "I'm feeling wonderful. I want a cruiserweight title, the world title", said Jones, who weighed in at 189 pounds. "This is just a start. I'm not through yet." The fight was aired live on Internet PPV channel Ustream for $9.99.

==== Jones vs. Głażewski ====
Jones was due to fight Polish boxer Dawid Kostecki (39–1, 25 KOs) in a ten-round bout at Atlas Arena, Poland on June 30. Days before the fight, Kostecki was arrested on June 19 in order to begin serving a 2 1/2-year prison sentence for a prior conviction of running a prostitution ring. Jones negotiated his deal with 12 Knockout Promotions, the fight's promoter, he was assured that Kostecki would not start serving his sentence until after the fight. 12 Knockout Promotions tried to secure a temporary release for Kostecki but were unsuccessful. Paweł Głażewski (17–0, 4 KOs), who was on standby all week, stepped in as a replacement. Jones defeated Głażewski by split decision (96–93, 94–95 & 96–94). There was some controversy from the decision. Many believed due to Jones being lined up to challenge then-WBC cruiserweight champion Krzysztof Włodarczyk, he was given the decision.

==== Jones vs. Benmakhlouf ====
On December 21, 2013, Jones defeated Zine Eddine Benmakhlouf (17–3–1, 8 KOs) by unanimous decision for the vacant WBU cruiserweight title at the Dynamo Palace of Sports in Krylatskoye in Moscow, Russia. The fight was billed as a "Winner Takes All" match, with the winner receiving the entire purse. Benmakhlouf took a knee after Jones wobbled him with a left hook early in the third round. The judges scored the bout 120–108, 119–109 and 118–111.

==== Miscellaneous fights ====
Jones, fighting at the Ķīpsala International Exhibition Centre in Latvia, defeated Courtney Fry (18–5–0) via RTD in the 5th round on July 26, 2014. Jones was ahead on all three judges scorecards by the end of the fourth round, (50–44, 50–44 & 50–45). On September 26, 2014, Jones defeated Hany Atiyo via 1st-round KO after 75 seconds. This fight took place in front of a sold-out crowd at The Basket Hall in Krasnodar, Russia. This was a second straight stoppage and fifth consecutive victory for Jones. The fight was said to be unsanctioned by the Professional Boxing Federation of Russia and the Egyptian Professional Boxing Association. Jones' next bout, for the first time 4 years, took place in USA at the Cabarrus Arena in Concord, North Carolina, and ultimately saw him defeat Willy Williams via 2nd-round TKO. Near the end of the same month on March 28, Jones was again back in the ring, this time against Paul Vasquez (10–6–1, 3 KOs), defeating him via 1st-round TKO for the WBU (German Version) cruiserweight title at the Pensacola Bay Center in Florida. On August 16, 2015, Jones scored his 62nd professional victory and 45th knockout win by defeating Eric Watkins via 6th-round KO.

==== Jones vs. Maccarinelli ====
On October 28, 2015, it was announced that Jones would be fighting former WBO cruiserweight champion Enzo Maccarinelli, 35, who had a career record of 40 wins and 7 losses, for the WBA 'super' world cruiserweight title. However, this was a 'false rumour'. It was however announced that they would fight on December 12, 2015, in a non-title cruiserweight battle. This was Jones' first fight since being granted Russian citizenship and he was going into it with eight straight victories, with the last five inside the distance. The fight took place at the VTB Ice Palace in Moscow.

After an evenly matched 3 rounds, the 4th round started more in Maccarinelli's favour. Halfway through the round, Maccarinelli dropped Jones with an uppercut. Jones beat the count and carried on for 10–12 seconds more with his gloves to his face, eating several more uppercuts. Against the ropes, he then absorbed a huge right hook which caused him to stiffen and fall face down on the canvas. Referee Ingo Barrabas waved off the fight in what was Jones' 9th career defeat, the 5th by KO.

==== Jones vs. Phillips ====
On March 20, 2016, Jones fought in Phoenix, Arizona, at the Celebrity Theatre against 33-year-old MMA fighter Vyron Phillips, who had won the right to fight him after having been selected through a vote on Facebook. Phillips, who fought in his first boxing match, was 5–3 in MMA bouts and 6–1 as an amateur boxer. Phillips would have received $100,000 if he had knocked Jones out, but was knocked down in the second round by Jones. The referee then stopped the fight.

==== Jones vs. Moore ====
Square Ring Promotions announced on July 29, Jones would return to his hometown, Pensacola Bay Center in Pensacola, Florida, on August 13 against journeyman "Rockin'" Rodney Moore (17–11–2, 7 KOs) in a cruiserweight bout. The fight headlined the "Island Fights 38" card, an ongoing series that combines boxing matches and MMA bouts on the same show. Jones last fought in Pensacola in March 2015, when he knocked out Paul Vasquez in the first round. Moore did not fight between 2005 and 2012 and has lost nine consecutive fights, although only one of them came by knockout. That was a second-round stoppage to top cruiserweight contender Murat Gassiev 13 months ago. On fight night, in front of more than 5,000 fans in attendance, in a slow-paced affair, Jones won a one-sided 10 round unanimous decision with shutout scores of 100–90 on all three cards.

It was noted that Jones incurred a tear in his right biceps in round five and fought the rest of the bout one handed and admitted after the bout the healing time required for his torn right biceps probably meant the end of his long career. In October, Jones stated his intentions to continue fighting on and not retiring from the sport.

==== Jones vs. Gunn ====
On December 2, 2016, David Feldman Promotions confirmed a fight between Jones and undefeated bare-knuckle fighter and former world title challenger Bobby Gunn would be announced for February 17, 2017, for the vacant World Boxing Foundation Cruiserweight championship at a press conference on December 6 at the Chase Center in Delaware. At the time of announcement, Gunn was a former IBA cruiserweight champion and bare-knuckle heavyweight champion, with a record of 72–0 with 72 knockouts. The fight was made official at the press conference on December 7. Jones spoke of his long-awaited desire to fight Gunn, "I always do things that people don't expect me to do. I promised Bobby a long time ago that I would give him the opportunity, and I am a man of my word. Come February 17th, I am going to shock the world again." At the official weigh-in Jones came in 199 pounds and Gunn weighed in lighter at 197.4 pounds. In a slow-paced fight, Jones stopped Gunn in the beginning of the 8th round, before Gunn had even left his corner, to win the vacant World Boxing Foundation cruiserweight title. Gunn injured his nose and was out boxed by Jones throughout seven rounds. In the post fight, Jones and Gunn both embraced.

Jones spoke about his desire to continue his boxing career further, "Anything is possible, I'm not going to make an immediate decision. Why would I stop when I looked that good though?... I want a shot at a cruiserweight title ... I do intend on fighting and we'll see what happens in the future. I looked good." Jones later told On The Ropes Boxing Radio, "Yeah I think it's my last year in boxing, and I tell people all the time." Hinting he may retire at the end of 2017. On December 3, 2017, after Miguel Cotto's farewell fight re-iterated his desire to continue boxing.

=== Retirement ===
==== Jones vs. Sigmon ====
On December 30, 2017, Jones announced that he would return to the Bay Center in Pensacola, Florida to headline the Island Fights 46 on February 8, 2018. Jones had previously headlined Island Fights, which is a show that included both boxing and MMA bouts. Speaking of the event, Jones said, "My last day at the Bay. It's my last one for the bayfront ... Civic Center, Pensacola, Bayfront Arena, whatever you want to call it. So if you want to come to see my last day in Pensacola, be there February 8. That's my last one there." He stated it would be his final fight. Jones announced Scott Sigmon (30–11–1, 16 KOs) as his opponent for the 10 round bout. Jones ended his boxing career defeating Sigmon via a one-sided 10 round unanimous decision, also winning the vacant World Boxing Union cruiserweight title in the process. All three judges scored the fight 98–92 in favour of Jones. Jones started off the better boxer landed upper cuts and hooks and remained in control throughout the fight. Jones landed an uppercut in round 5 which knocked Sigmon's mouthpiece out. In round 6, Sigmon began throwing more punches, although they were weak combinations easily blocked by Jones. Jones was also able to counter most of the shots Sigmon threw.

After the fight, Jones stated he had fought with a bicep injury. He also called for a boxing match against 42-year-old former UFC middleweight champion Anderson Silva. In the post-fight interview, he said, "I knew Scott was tough, I knew Scott was game and I knew Scott would keep coming. However, I don't make excuses, but last week I tore my biceps in my left arm again and I refused to pull out. Other than that [fight], chapter closed." Jones retired after 75 professional fights over 29 years; 66 wins, 47 coming inside the distance and 9 losses.

=== Return in 2023 ===
==== Jones vs. Pettis ====
Jorge Masvidal announced that Jones would face former UFC and WEC Lightweight Champion Anthony Pettis (25–14 MMA) on April 1, 2023, at the Fiserv Forum in Milwaukee, Wisconsin, the hometown of Pettis. The fight headlined a PPV card and included many high-profile MMA fighters, all competing in boxing matches. Jones lost via majority decision after eight-rounds, with scores of 76–76, 77–75, and 78–74.

== Exhibition bout ==
It was announced in July 2020 that Jones had signed a contract to face former undisputed heavyweight champion Mike Tyson in an eight-round exhibition fight. The bout, officially sanctioned by the California State Athletic Commission (CSAC), was initially scheduled to take place on September 12 at Dignity Health Sports Park in Carson, California. The date was later postponed to November 28 in order to maximize revenue for the event. As part of his preparation for the exhibition, Jones sparred with cruiserweight boxer Craig Parker, whom Jones identified as the sparring partner who most closely resembled Tyson. The fight lasted the full eight rounds and was declared a draw. Jones was later sued by his marketing manager, Mercedes Ganon, for breach of contract and failure to pay her a 10% commission for the fight that she negotiated, according to legal documents.

== Personal life ==
Jones and his wife have three children. Their eldest son, Roy III, played basketball at Findlay Prep in Henderson, Nevada. On June 24, 2024, Jones announced his son Deandre had committed suicide at age 32 two nights prior. His cousin, RJ Harvey, is a professional football running back who plays for the Denver Broncos.

=== Acquisition of Russian citizenship ===
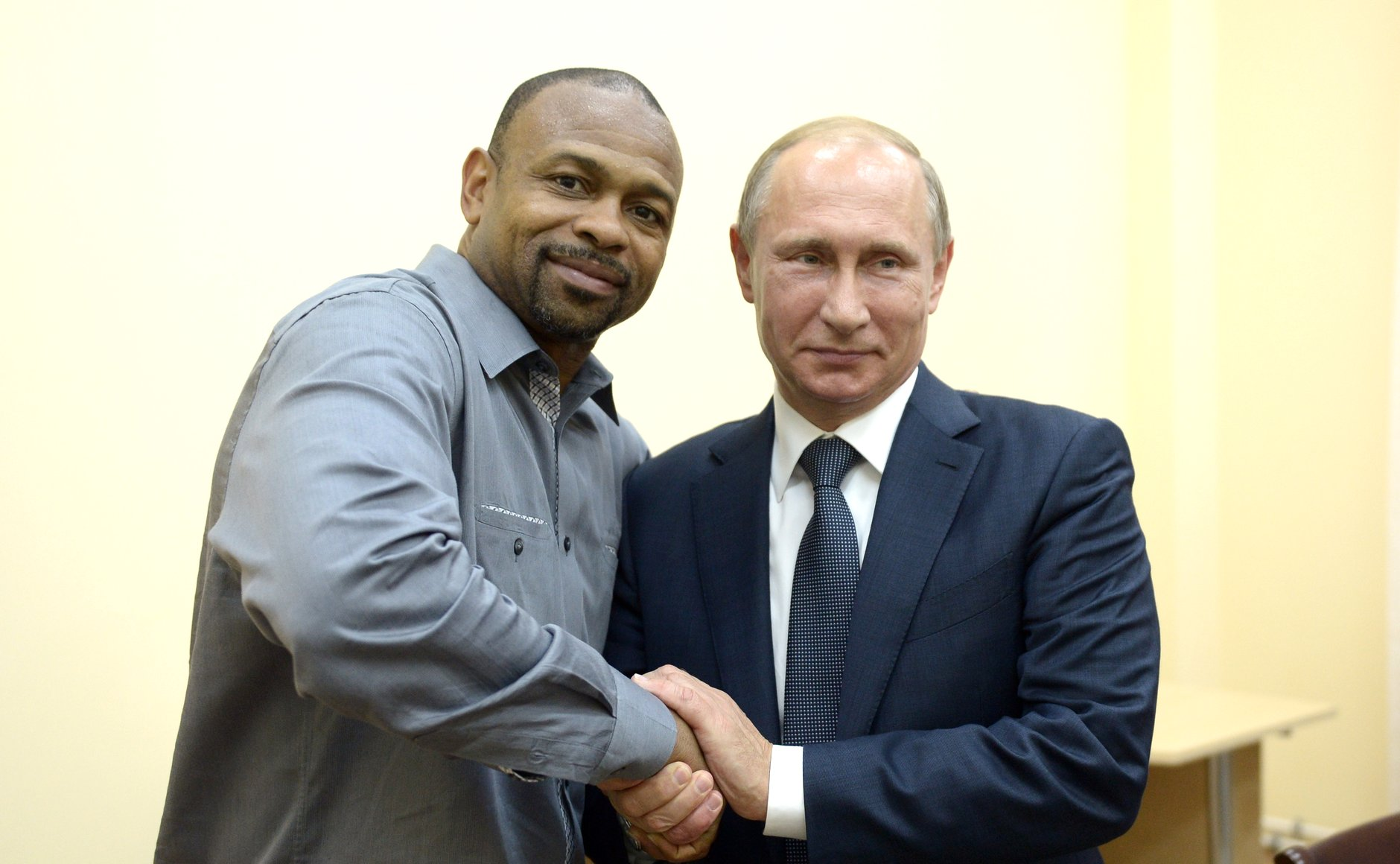
Jones with Vladimir Putin, 2015

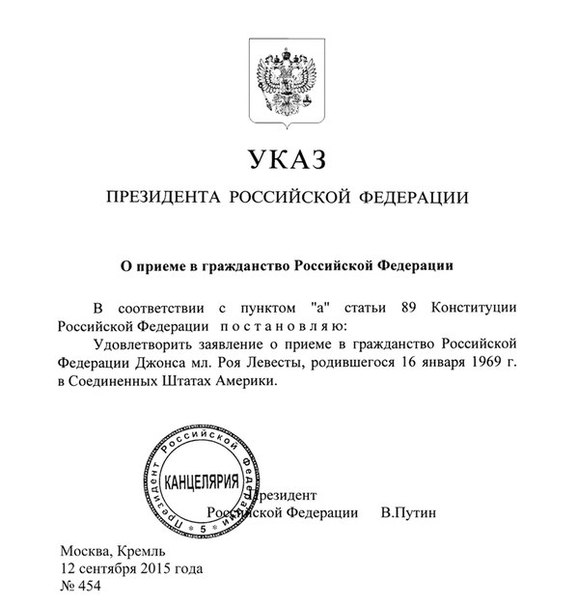
Vladimir Putin's decree of Russian citizenship to Jones, 2015

On August 19, 2015, Roy Jones Jr. met with Vladimir Putin in Sevastopol, Crimea, to ask for Russian citizenship. Jones stated that he often visited Russia for business activity, and a passport would avoid inconvenient rides. Jones was granted Russian citizenship on September 12. He was banned from entering Ukraine after arriving to Russian-occupied Crimea from Russia.

== Professional boxing record ==
76 fights	66 wins	10 losses
By knockout	47	5
By decision	19	4
By disqualification	0	1

No.	Result	Record	Opponent	Type	Round, time	Date	Age	Location	Notes
76	Loss	66–10	Anthony Pettis	MD	8	Apr 1, 2023	54 years, 75 days	Fiserv Forum, Milwaukee, Wisconsin, U.S.	
75	Win	66–9	Scott Sigmon	UD	10	Feb 8, 2018	49 years, 23 days	Bay Center, Pensacola, Florida, U.S.	Won vacant WBU (German version) cruiserweight title
74	Win	65–9	Bobby Gunn	TKO	8 (12), 0:07	Feb 17, 2017	48 years, 32 days	Chase Center, Wilmington, Delaware, U.S.	Won vacant WBF (Foundation) cruiserweight title
73	Win	64–9	Rodney Moore	UD	10	Aug 13, 2016	47 years, 210 days	Bay Center, Pensacola, Florida, U.S.	
72	Win	63–9	Vyron Phillips	TKO	2 (6), 2:30	Mar 20, 2016	47 years, 64 days	Celebrity Theatre, Phoenix, Arizona, U.S.	
71	Loss	62–9	Enzo Maccarinelli	KO	4 (10), 1:59	Dec 12, 2015	46 years, 330 days	VTB Ice Palace, Moscow, Russia	
70	Win	62–8	Eric Watkins	KO	6 (10), 2:59	Aug 16, 2015	46 years, 212 days	Foxwoods Resort Casino, Ledyard, Connecticut, U.S.	
69	Win	61–8	Paul Vasquez	TKO	1 (12), 3:00	Mar 28, 2015	46 years, 71 days	Bay Center, Pensacola, Florida, U.S.	Retained WBU (German version) cruiserweight title
68	Win	60–8	Willie Williams	TKO	2 (10), 2:38	Mar 6, 2015	46 years, 49 days	Cabarrus Arena, Concord, North Carolina, U.S.	
67	Win	59–8	Hany Atiyo	KO	1 (12), 1:15	Sep 26, 2014	45 years, 253 days	Basket-Hall, Krasnodar, Russia	Retained WBU (German version) cruiserweight title
66	Win	58–8	Courtney Fry	RTD	5 (12), 3:00	Jul 26, 2014	45 years, 191 days	Ķīpsala International Exhibition Centre, Riga, Latvia	Retained WBU (German version) cruiserweight title
65	Win	57–8	Zine Eddine Benmakhlouf	UD	12	Dec 21, 2013	44 years, 339 days	Krylatskoye Sports Palace, Moscow, Russia	Won vacant WBU (German version) cruiserweight title
64	Win	56–8	Paweł Głażewski	SD	10	Jun 30, 2012	43 years, 166 days	Atlas Arena, Łódź, Poland	
63	Win	55–8	Max Alexander	UD	10	Dec 10, 2011	42 years, 328 days	Civic Center, Atlanta, Georgia, U.S.	Won vacant UBO Intercontinental cruiserweight title
62	Loss	54–8	Denis Lebedev	KO	10 (10), 2:58	May 21, 2011	42 years, 125 days	Krylatskoye Sports Palace, Moscow, Russia	
61	Loss	54–7	Bernard Hopkins	UD	12	Apr 3, 2010	41 years, 77 days	Mandalay Bay Events Center, Paradise, Nevada, U.S.	
60	Loss	54–6	Danny Green	TKO	1 (12), 2:02	Dec 2, 2009	40 years, 320 days	Acer Arena, Sydney, Australia	For IBO cruiserweight title
59	Win	54–5	Jeff Lacy	RTD	10 (12), 3:00	Aug 15, 2009	40 years, 211 days	Coast Coliseum, Biloxi, Mississippi, U.S.	Retained WBO–NABO light heavyweight title
58	Win	53–5	Omar Sheika	TKO	5 (12), 1:45	Mar 21, 2009	40 years, 64 days	Civic Center, Pensacola, Florida, U.S.	Won vacant WBO–NABO light heavyweight title
57	Loss	52–5	Joe Calzaghe	UD	12	Nov 8, 2008	39 years, 297 days	Madison Square Garden, New York City, New York, U.S.	For The Ring light heavyweight title
56	Win	52–4	Félix Trinidad	UD	12	Jan 19, 2008	39 years, 3 days	Madison Square Garden, New York City, New York, U.S.	
55	Win	51–4	Anthony Hanshaw	UD	12	Jul 14, 2007	38 years, 179 days	Coast Coliseum, Biloxi, Mississippi, U.S.	Won vacant IBC light heavyweight title
54	Win	50–4	Prince Badi Ajamu	UD	12	Jul 29, 2006	37 years, 194 days	Qwest Arena, Boise, Idaho, U.S.	Won WBO–NABO light heavyweight title
53	Loss	49–4	Antonio Tarver	UD	12	Oct 1, 2005	36 years, 258 days	St. Pete Times Forum, Tampa, Florida, U.S.	For IBO and The Ring light heavyweight titles
52	Loss	49–3	Glen Johnson	KO	9 (12), 0:48	Sep 25, 2004	35 years, 253 days	FedExForum, Memphis, Tennessee, U.S.	For IBF light heavyweight title
51	Loss	49–2	Antonio Tarver	TKO	2 (12), 1:41	May 15, 2004	35 years, 120 days	Mandalay Bay Events Center, Paradise, Nevada, U.S.	Lost WBA (Unified), WBC, IBO, IBA and The Ring light heavyweight titles; For vacant WBF (Foundation) light heavyweight title
50	Win	49–1	Antonio Tarver	MD	12	Nov 8, 2003	34 years, 296 days	Mandalay Bay Events Center, Paradise, Nevada, U.S.	Retained IBO and The Ring light heavyweight titles; Won WBC and vacant WBA (Unified) light heavyweight titles
49	Win	48–1	John Ruiz	UD	12	Mar 1, 2003	34 years, 44 days	Thomas & Mack Center, Paradise, Nevada, U.S.	Won WBA heavyweight title
48	Win	47–1	Clinton Woods	TKO	6 (12), 1:29	Sep 7, 2002	33 years, 234 days	Rose Garden, Portland, Oregon, U.S.	Retained WBA (Unified), WBC, IBF, IBO, WBF (Federation), NBA, IBA and The Ring light heavyweight titles
47	Win	46–1	Glen Kelly	KO	7 (12), 1:55	Feb 2, 2002	33 years, 17 days	American Airlines Arena, Miami, Florida, U.S.	Retained WBA (Super), WBC, IBF, IBO, WBF (Federation), NBA, IBA and The Ring light heavyweight titles
46	Win	45–1	Julio César González	UD	12	Jul 28, 2001	32 years, 193 days	Staples Center, Los Angeles, California, U.S.	Retained WBA (Super), WBC, IBF, NBA and IBO light heavyweight titles; Won vacant WBF (Federation) and IBA light heavyweight titles
45	Win	44–1	Derrick Harmon	RTD	10 (12), 3:00	Feb 24, 2001	32 years, 39 days	Ice Palace, Tampa, Florida, U.S.	Retained WBA (Super), WBC, IBF and IBO light heavyweight titles; Won vacant NBA light heavyweight title
44	Win	43–1	Eric Harding	RTD	10 (12), 3:00	Sep 9, 2000	31 years, 237 days	New Orleans Arena, New Orleans, Louisiana, U.S.	Retained WBA, WBC, IBF and IBO light heavyweight titles
43	Win	42–1	Richard Hall	TKO	11 (12), 1:41	May 13, 2000	31 years, 118 days	Conseco Fieldhouse, Indianapolis, Indiana, U.S.	Retained WBA, WBC, IBF and IBO light heavyweight titles
42	Win	41–1	David Telesco	UD	12	Jan 15, 2000	30 years, 364 days	Radio City Music Hall, New York City, New York, U.S.	Retained WBA, WBC, IBF and IBO light heavyweight titles
41	Win	40–1	Reggie Johnson	UD	12	Jun 5, 1999	30 years, 140 days	Grand Casino, Biloxi, Mississippi, U.S.	Retained WBA and WBC light heavyweight titles; Won IBF light heavyweight title
40	Win	39–1	Richard Frazier	TKO	2 (12), 2:59	Jan 9, 1999	29 years, 358 days	Civic Center, Pensacola, Florida, U.S.	Retained WBA and WBC light heavyweight titles
39	Win	38–1	Otis Grant	TKO	10 (12), 1:18	Nov 14, 1998	29 years, 302 days	Foxwoods Resort Casino, Ledyard, Connecticut, U.S.	Retained WBA and WBC light heavyweight titles
38	Win	37–1	Lou Del Valle	UD	12	Jul 18, 1998	29 years, 183 days	Madison Square Garden, New York City, New York, U.S.	Won WBA light heavyweight title
37	Win	36–1	Virgil Hill	KO	4 (12), 1:10	Apr 25, 1998	29 years, 99 days	Coast Coliseum, Biloxi, Mississippi, U.S.	
36	Win	35–1	Montell Griffin	KO	1 (12), 2:31	Aug 7, 1997	28 years, 203 days	Foxwoods Resort Casino, Ledyard, Connecticut, U.S.	Won WBC light heavyweight title
35	Loss	34–1	Montell Griffin	DQ	9 (12), 2:27	Mar 21, 1997	28 years, 64 days	Etess Arena, Atlantic City, New Jersey, U.S.	Lost WBC light heavyweight title; Jones disqualified for hitting Griffin after a knockdown
34	Win	34–0	Mike McCallum	UD	12	Nov 22, 1996	27 years, 311 days	Ice Palace, Tampa, Florida, U.S.	Won vacant WBC interim light heavyweight title
33	Win	33–0	Bryant Brannon	TKO	2 (12), 2:23	Oct 4, 1996	27 years, 262 days	Madison Square Garden, New York City, New York, U.S.	Retained IBF super middleweight title
32	Win	32–0	Éric Lucas	RTD	11 (12), 3:00	Jun 15, 1996	27 years, 151 days	Coliseum, Jacksonville, Florida, U.S.	Retained IBF super middleweight title
31	Win	31–0	Merqui Sosa	TKO	2 (12), 2:36	Jan 12, 1996	26 years, 361 days	Madison Square Garden, New York City, New York, U.S.	
30	Win	30–0	Tony Thornton	TKO	3 (12), 0:45	Sep 30, 1995	26 years, 257 days	Civic Center, Pensacola, Florida, U.S.	Retained IBF super middleweight title
29	Win	29–0	Vinny Pazienza	TKO	6 (12), 2:58	Jun 24, 1995	26 years, 159 days	Convention Hall, Atlantic City, New Jersey, U.S.	Retained IBF super middleweight title
28	Win	28–0	Antoine Byrd	TKO	1 (12), 2:06	Mar 18, 1995	26 years, 61 days	Civic Center, Pensacola, Florida, U.S.	Retained IBF super middleweight title
27	Win	27–0	James Toney	UD	12	Nov 18, 1994	25 years, 306 days	MGM Grand Garden Arena, Paradise, Nevada, U.S.	Won IBF super middleweight title
26	Win	26–0	Thomas Tate	TKO	2 (12), 0:30	May 27, 1994	25 years, 131 days	MGM Grand Garden Arena, Paradise, Nevada, U.S.	Retained IBF middleweight title
25	Win	25–0	Danny Garcia	KO	6 (10), 2:59	Mar 22, 1994	25 years, 65 days	University of West Florida, Pensacola, Florida, U.S.	
24	Win	24–0	Fermin Chirino	UD	10	Nov 30, 1993	24 years, 318 days	Civic Center, Pensacola, Florida, U.S.	
23	Win	23–0	Thulani Malinga	KO	6 (10), 1:57	Aug 14, 1993	24 years, 210 days	Casino Magic, Bay St. Louis, Mississippi, U.S.	
22	Win	22–0	Bernard Hopkins	UD	12	May 22, 1993	24 years, 126 days	Robert F. Kennedy Memorial Stadium, Washington, D.C., U.S.	Won vacant IBF middleweight title
21	Win	21–0	Glenn Wolfe	TKO	1 (10), 2:23	Feb 13, 1993	24 years, 28 days	Caesars Palace, Paradise, Nevada, U.S.	
20	Win	20–0	Percy Harris	TKO	4 (12), 3:00	Dec 5, 1992	23 years, 324 days	Etess Arena, Atlantic City, New Jersey, U.S.	Won vacant WBC Continental Americas super middleweight title
19	Win	19–0	Glenn Thomas	TKO	8 (10), 3:00	Aug 18, 1992	23 years, 215 days	Bayfront Auditorium, Pensacola, Florida, U.S.	
18	Win	18–0	Jorge Castro	UD	10	Jun 30, 1992	23 years, 166 days	Civic Center, Pensacola, Florida, U.S.	
17	Win	17–0	Art Serwano	KO	1 (10), 1:40	Apr 3, 1992	23 years, 78 days	Convention Center, Reno, Nevada, U.S.	
16	Win	16–0	Jorge Vaca	KO	1 (10), 1:45	Jan 10, 1992	22 years, 359 days	Paramount Theatre, New York City, New York, U.S.	
15	Win	15–0	Lester Yarbrough	KO	9 (10)	Aug 31, 1991	22 years, 227 days	Interstate Fairgrounds, Pensacola, Florida, U.S.	
14	Win	14–0	Kevin Daigle	TKO	2 (10)	Aug 3, 1991	22 years, 199 days	Interstate Fairgrounds, Pensacola, Florida, U.S.	
13	Win	13–0	Eddie Evans	TKO	3 (10)	Apr 13, 1991	22 years, 87 days	Interstate Fairgrounds, Pensacola, Florida, U.S.	
12	Win	12–0	Ricky Stackhouse	KO	1 (10), 0:46	Jan 31, 1991	22 years, 15 days	Bayfront Auditorium, Pensacola, Florida, U.S.	
11	Win	11–0	Reggie Miller	TKO	5 (10)	Nov 8, 1990	21 years, 296 days	Bayfront Auditorium, Pensacola, Florida, U.S.	
10	Win	10–0	Rollin Williams	KO	4 (10), 2:56	Sep 25, 1990	21 years, 252 days	Bayfront Auditorium, Pensacola, Florida, U.S.	
9	Win	9–0	Tony Waddles	KO	1 (10), 2:02	Jul 14, 1990	21 years, 179 days	Bayfront Auditorium, Pensacola, Florida, U.S.	Waddles was billed as Derwin Richards
8	Win	8–0	Ron Johnson	KO	2 (10), 2:28	May 11, 1990	21 years, 115 days	Bayfront Auditorium, Pensacola, Florida, U.S.	
7	Win	7–0	Knox Brown	TKO	3 (10), 2:20	Mar 28, 1990	21 years, 71 days	Interstate Fairgrounds, Pensacola, Florida, U.S.	
6	Win	6–0	Billy Mitchem	TKO	2 (8), 2:57	Feb 28, 1990	21 years, 43 days	Interstate Fairgrounds, Pensacola, Florida, U.S.	
5	Win	5–0	Joe Edens	KO	2 (8), 2:05	Jan 8, 1990	20 years, 357 days	County Fairgrounds, Mobile, Alabama, U.S.	
4	Win	4–0	David McCluskey	TKO	3 (8), 2:00	Nov 30, 1989	20 years, 318 days	Bayfront Auditorium, Pensacola, Florida, U.S.	
3	Win	3–0	Ron Amundsen	TKO	7 (8), 2:43	Sep 3, 1989	20 years, 230 days	Civic Center, Pensacola, Florida, U.S.	
2	Win	2–0	Stephan Johnson	TKO	8 (8), 2:04	Jun 11, 1989	20 years, 146 days	Trump Plaza Hotel and Casino, Atlantic City, New Jersey, U.S.	
1	Win	1–0	Ricky Randall	TKO	2 (8), 2:46	May 6, 1989	20 years, 110 days	Civic Center, Pensacola, Florida, U.S.	

== Exhibition boxing record ==
2 fights	0 wins	0 losses
Draws	1	
Non-scored	1	

No.	Result	Record	Opponent	Type	Round, time	Date	Location	Notes
2	Draw	0–0–1 (1)	Mike Tyson	SD	8	Nov 28, 2020	Staples Center, Los Angeles, California, U.S.	Scored by the WBC
1	—N/a	0–0 (1)	Dion Rizzuto	—N/a	3	Feb 7, 2019	Hadji Shrine Temple, Pensacola, Florida, U.S.	Non-scored bout

== Titles in boxing ==
=== Major world titles ===
- IBF middleweight champion (160 lbs)
- IBF super middleweight champion (168 lbs)
- WBA (Regular, Unified, and Super) light heavyweight champion (2×) (Note: Held these titles separately at varying points; At no point during his reigns was he a Secondary champion; Held the WBA (Unified) twice.) (175 lbs)
- WBC light heavyweight champion (175 lbs) (3×)
- IBF light heavyweight champion (175 lbs)
- WBA heavyweight champion (200+ lbs)

=== The Ring magazine titles ===
- The Ring light heavyweight champion (175 lbs)

=== Interim world titles ===
- WBC interim light heavyweight champion (175 lbs)

=== Minor world titles ===
- IBO light heavyweight champion (175 lbs)
- IBA light heavyweight champion (175 lbs)
- IBC light heavyweight champion (175 lbs)
- WBF light heavyweight champion (175 lbs)
- NBA light heavyweight champion (175 lbs)
- WBF (Foundation) cruiserweight champion (200 lbs)
- WBU (German) cruiserweight champion (200 lbs) (3×)

=== Regional/International titles ===
- WBC Continental Americas super middleweight champion (168 lbs)
- NABO light heavyweight champion (175 lbs) (2×)
- UBO Intercontinental cruiserweight champion (200 lbs)

=== Undisputed titles ===
- Undisputed light heavyweight champion

=== Honorary titles ===
- WBC Emeritus Champion
- WBC Frontline Battle champion

== Pay-per-view bouts ==
No.	Date	Fight	Billing	Buys
1	November 18, 1994	Toney vs. Jones	The Uncivil War	300,000
2	September 9, 2000	Jones vs. Harding	Bourbon St Brawl	140,000
3	July 28, 2001	Jones vs. Gonzalez	Roy vs. Julio	200,000
4	March 1, 2003	Jones vs. Ruiz	Never take a Heavyweight Lightly	602,000
5	November 8, 2003	Jones vs. Tarver	Now It's Personal	302,000
6	May 15, 2004	Jones vs. Tarver II	More Than Personal	384,000
7	October 1, 2005	Jones vs. Tarver III	No Excuses	440,000
8	January 19, 2008	Jones vs. Trinidad	Bring on the Titans	500,000
9	November 8, 2008	Calzaghe vs. Jones	Battle of the Superpowers	225,000
10	March 3, 2010	Hopkins vs. Jones II	The Rivals	150,000
11	November 28, 2020	Tyson vs. Jones	Lockdown Knockdown	1,600,000
	Total sales			4,778,000

== Music career ==
Roy Jones Jr.
- Born: Pensacola, Florida, U.S.
- Genres: Hip hop, Southern hip hop, crunk
- Occupations: rapper, boxer
- Years active: 2001–present
- Label: Body Head Entertainment

Jones started his rap music career in 2001 with his album, titled Round One: The Album and the debut single, "Y'All Must've Forgot". In 2004, Jones formed a group, Body Head Bangerz and released an album. The album, Body Head Bangerz: Volume One, featured B.G., Juvenile, Bun B of UGK, Petey Pablo, Lil' Flip and Mike Jones among others.

In addition, Jones has made multiple songs regarding Florida State University Athletics. Growing up in the panhandle of Florida, Jones has been a long time fan of Florida State University.

== Discography ==
=== Album ===
Album information
Round One: The Album
- Released: February 26, 2002
- Label: Body Head Entertainment
- Last RIAA Certification: None
- Singles: "Y'all Must've Forgot", "And Still"

=== With Body Head Bangerz ===
Album information
Body Head Bangerz: Volume One
- Released: October 26, 2004
- Label: Body Head Entertainment
- Last RIAA Certification: None
- Singles: "Can't Be Touched", "I Smoke, I Drank (Remix)"

=== Solo singles ===
- 2001: "Y'all Must've Forgot"
- 2001: "And Still"
- 2009: "Battle of the Super Powers"
- 2019: "Make 'em Remember" (Production Manager/Master Engineer: Grant Wilson Baker)

=== Featured singles ===
- 2004: "Can't Be Touched"

== Filmography ==
- Mad TV (1995) - Himself (Episode: #104)
- Married... with Children (1996) - Customer (Episode: Torch Song Duet)
- The Devil's Advocate (1997) – Himself
- The Sentinel (1998) – Sweet Roy Williams (Episode: "Sweet Science")
- The Wayans Brothers (1999) – Himself (Episode: "Rope-a-Dope")
- The Matrix Reloaded (2003) – Captain Ballard
- Enter the Matrix (2003) – Captain Ballard
- Cordially Invited (2007) – Lenny Banks
- Little Fockers (2010) - Party Parent
- Universal Soldier: Day of Reckoning (2012) – Mess Hall Unisol
- Grudge Match (2013) – Himself
- Inside Mayweather vs. Pacquiao (2015) - Himself (Epilogue episode, cameo)
- Southpaw (2015) – Himself
- Creed II (2018) – Himself

== Notes ==
Sporting positions
Amateur boxing titles
Previous: Robert Guy	U.S. Golden Gloves light welterweight champion 1986	Next: Todd Foster
Regional boxing titles
New title	WBC Continental Americas super middleweight champion December 5, 1992 – February 1993; Vacated	Vacant Title next held by Carl Jones
Preceded by Prince Badi Ajamu	NABO light heavyweight champion July 29, 2006 – April 2007; Vacated	Vacant Title next held by Otis Griffin
Vacant Title last held by Tavoris Cloud	NABO light heavyweight champion March 21, 2009 – December 2009; Vacated	Vacant Title next held by Andrzej Fonfara
Vacant Title last held by Matamba Debatch Postolo	UBO Intercontinental cruiserweight champion December 10, 2011 – August 2012; Vacated	Vacant Title next held by David Radeff
Minor world boxing titles
Vacant Title last held by Drake Thadzi	IBO light heavyweight champion November 18, 1999 – May 15, 2004	Succeeded by Antonio Tarver
Vacant Title last held by Ole Klemetsen	IBA light heavyweight champion July 28, 2001 – May 15, 2004	Succeeded by Antonio Tarver
Vacant Title last held by Mark Baker	WBF (Federation) light heavyweight champion July 28, 2001 – February 2003; Vacated	Vacant Title next held by Manuel Ossie
Vacant Title last held by Rachid Kanfouah	IBC light heavyweight champion July 14, 2007 – March 2008; Vacated	Vacant Title next held by Dawid Kostecki
Vacant Title last held by Dennis Ronert	WBU cruiserweight champion German title December 21, 2013 – December 2016; Vacated	Vacant Title next held by Sotirios Georgikeas
Vacant Title last held by Marino Goles	WBF (Foundation) cruiserweight champion February 18, 2017 – February 8, 2018; Retired	Vacant
Vacant Title last held by Sotirios Georgikeas	WBU cruiserweight champion German title February 8, 2018 – February 8, 2018; Retired	Vacant Title next held by Tefik Bejrami
Major world boxing titles
Vacant Title last held by James Toney	IBF middleweight champion May 22, 1993 – August 25, 1994; Vacated	Vacant Title next held by Bernard Hopkins
Preceded by James Toney	IBF super middleweight champion November 18, 1994 – February 20, 1997; Vacated	Vacant Title next held by Charles Brewer
Vacant Title last held by Mike McCallum	WBC light heavyweight champion Interim title November 22, 1996 – January 13, 1997; Promoted	Vacant Title next held by Adrian Diaconu
Preceded by Fabrice Tiozzo vacated	WBC light heavyweight champion January 13, 1997 – March 21, 1997	Succeeded by Montell Griffin
Preceded by Montell Griffin	WBC light heavyweight champion August 7, 1997 – November 5, 1997; Vacated	Vacant Title next held by Graciano Rocchigiani
Preceded by Lou Del Valle	WBA light heavyweight champion July 18, 1998 – December 2000; Promoted	Succeeded by Silvio Branco
Preceded by Graciano Rocchigiani stripped	WBC light heavyweight champion October 1998 – April 4, 2003; Stripped	Vacant Title next held by Antonio Tarver
Preceded by Reggie Johnson	IBF light heavyweight champion June 5, 1999 – November 18, 2002; Vacated	Vacant Title next held by Antonio Tarver
Vacant Title last held by Michael Spinks	Undisputed light heavyweight champion June 5, 1999 – November 18, 2002; Titles fragmented	Vacant Title next held by Artur Beterbiev
New title	WBA light heavyweight champion Super title December 2000 – April 15, 2003; Vacated; Unified champion from August 5, 2002	Vacant Title next held by Himself
Vacant Title last held by Michael Spinks	The Ring light heavyweight champion December 2, 2001 – May 15, 2004	Succeeded by Antonio Tarver
Preceded by John Ruiz	WBA heavyweight champion March 1, 2003 – February 24, 2004; Vacated	Succeeded by John Ruiz
Vacant Title last held by Himself	WBA light heavyweight champion Unified title November 8, 2003 – May 15, 2004	Succeeded by Antonio Tarver
Preceded by Antonio Tarver	WBC light heavyweight champion November 8, 2003 – May 15, 2004	Succeeded by Antonio Tarver
Awards
Previous: Michael Carbajal	The Ring Fighter of the Year; 1994	Next: Oscar De La Hoya
Inaugural award	BWAA Fighter of the Decade; 1990s	Next: Manny Pacquiao
Previous: George Foreman	Best Boxer ESPY Award; 1996	Next: Evander Holyfield
Previous: Oscar De La Hoya	Best Boxer ESPY Award; 2000	Next: Félix Trinidad
Previous: Lennox Lewis	Best Boxer ESPY Award; 2003	Next: Antonio Tarver
Achievements
Preceded by Pernell Whitaker	The Ring pound for pound #1 boxer April 18, 1996 – April 17, 1997	Succeeded by Oscar De La Hoya
Preceded by Oscar De La Hoya	The Ring pound for pound #1 boxer October 5, 1999 – July 5, 2000	Succeeded by Shane Mosley
Preceded by Bernard Hopkins	The Ring pound for pound #1 boxer March 11, 2003 – June 8, 2004	Succeeded by Bernard Hopkins
