= Roy Jones Jr. vs. Danny Green =

Boxing competition

It's On!
- Date: December 2, 2009
- Venue: Sydney SuperDome, Sydney, Australia
- Title(s) on the line: IBO cruiserweight title

Tale of the tape
Boxer	Danny Green	Roy Jones Jr.
Nickname	The Green Machine	Junior
Hometown	Perth, Australia	Pensacola, Florida, U.S.
Pre-fight record	28–3 (24 KO)	54–5 (38 KO)
Age	36 years, 8 months	40 years, 10 months
Height	6 ft 1 in (185 cm)	5 ft 11 in (180 cm)
Weight	179 1/4 lb (81 kg)	179 1/2 lb (81 kg)
Style	Orthodox	Orthodox
Recognition	WBC; No. 13 Ranked Cruiserweight; The Ring; No. 8 Ranked Cruiserweight; IBO; Cruiserweight Champion; Former WBA Light Heavyweight champion	IBF/WBO; No. 1 Ranked Light Heavyweight; WBC/WBA; No. 3 Ranked Light Heavyweight; The Ring; No. 5 Ranked Light Heavyweight; 4-division world champion

Result
- Green wins via 1st-round KO

Roy Jones Jr. vs. Danny Green, billed as It's On!, was a professional boxing match contested on December 6, 2009 for the IBO cruiserweight championship.

== Background ==
17 years after their first bout in 1993, Roy Jones Jr. and Bernard Hopkins, both of whom had become two of the most successful and decorated boxers in the sport since then, had finally come to an agreement for their long-awaited rematch. As a precursor to their fight, both Jones and Hopkins had bouts scheduled on December 2, 2009, with both fighters needing victories for their rematch to continue forward. Hopkins chose to face fringe-middleweight contender Enrique Ornelas, while Jones proceeded with his planned IBO cruiserweight title match against Danny Green which had been agreed to since June. Green had won the IBO cruiserweight title in his previous fight in August, making him a three-division champion as he had previously won world titles in the super middleweight and light heavyweight divisions. Jones was looking to join an exclusive list that featured only nine other boxers by winning his fifth world title in his fifth different division.

== The fight ==
After only one minute and 15 seconds of action, Green caught Jones with a right hand that dropped Jones to the canvas. Jones was able to get back up, and, though he was clearly hurt from the punch, was allowed to continue. Green then swarmed Jones and furiously pounded Jones into a corner with a bevy of punches as Jones simply covered up. After nearly 20 seconds of abuse, Jones was finally able to get out of the corner and clinched Green. Following a break by the referee, Green continued his assault on Jones, who again just covered up and offered no offense. Following that exchange, the referee stepped in and Green was named the winner by technical knockout at 2:02 of the first round. Arguably the most lopsided loss in his career, it remains Jones' first and only first round knockout loss.

== Aftermath ==
Jones was initially gracious in his humbling defeat, stating that "We don't make excuses, it was a great performance by Danny." However, less than a month later, Jones would launch a formal complaint, accusing Green of using illegal hand wraps and demanding his loss be overturned, though the decision was upheld. Though Jones' rematch with Hopkins looked to be in trouble following Jones' loss, the two sides would officially come to an agreement in February 2010 for an April 3 bout.

== Undercard ==
Confirmed bouts:

== Broadcasting ==
Country	Broadcaster
Australia	Main Event
United States	Versus

Preceded by vs. Julio Cesar Dominguez	Danny Green's bouts 2 December 2009	Succeeded by vs. Manny Siaca
Preceded by vs. Jeff Lacy	Roy Jones Jr.'s bouts 2 December 2009	Succeeded by vs. Bernard Hopkins II
