= Roy Jones Jr. vs. Antonio Tarver =

Boxing competition

Now It's Personal
- Date: November 8, 2003
- Venue: Mandalay Bay Resort & Casino, Paradise, Nevada, U.S.
- Title(s) on the line: WBC, IBO, The Ring, and vacant WBA (Unified) light heavyweight titles

Tale of the tape
Boxer	Roy Jones Jr.	Antonio Tarver
Nickname	Junior	The Magic Man
Hometown	Pensacola, Florida, U.S.	Orlando, Florida, U.S.
Purse	$5,000,000	$1,600,000
Pre-fight record	48–1 (38 KO)	21–1 (17 KO)
Age	34 years, 9 months	34 years, 11 months
Height	5 ft 11 in (180 cm)	6 ft 2 in (188 cm)
Weight	175 lb (79 kg)	175 lb (79 kg)
Style	Orthodox	Southpaw
Recognition	IBO, and The Ring; Light Heavyweight Champion; WBA; Heavyweight Champion; The Ring No. 1 ranked pound-for-pound fighter 4-division world champion	WBC; Light Heavyweight Champion; The Ring; No. 1 Ranked Light Heavyweight

Result
- Jones Jr. wins via 12-round majority decision (114-114, 117-111, 116-112)

Roy Jones Jr. vs. Antonio Tarver, billed as Now It's Personal, was a professional boxing match contested on November 8, 2003 for the vacant WBA (Unified) title, Tarver's WBC light-heavyweight championship, Jones' IBO and The Ring light-heavyweight championships.

== Background ==
On March 1, 2003, then-undisputed light heavyweight champion Roy Jones Jr. picked up a historic victory over John Ruiz that made him the WBA heavyweight champion. Following this, Jones' WBA, WBC, IBF, IBA, NBA and WBF light heavyweight titles were vacated and Antonio Tarver met former WBC light-heavyweight champion Montell Griffin (the only man to hold a victory over Jones at that point) to determine who would become the new WBC and IBF light-heavyweight champion. Tarver dominated Griffin throughout the fight, winning all 12 rounds en route to a clearcut unanimous decision victory. Though it was not immediately known if Jones would continue to fight at heavyweight or return to the light heavyweight division, Jones ultimately decided to return to light heavyweight and challenge Tarver, who had called Jones out following his victory over Ruiz at the post-fight press conference. Originally, the bout was to be contested for both the WBC and IBF belts that Tarver held, but Tarver vacated the IBF title only a week before the match was to take place in anticipation that he would be unable to make a mandatory defense of the title.

Prior to the fight, there was controversy as to who would enter the ring and be introduced last. Tarver was officially the WBC light-heavyweight champion and tradition called for the champion to both enter the ring and be introduced last (a notable exception to this tradition had been the Larry Holmes–Gerry Cooney fight in 1982). Jones had his own titles and had not been beaten for the WBC title that Tarver now held, while Jones was still recognized as The Ring light-heavyweight champion, and he insisted that he be allowed to enter the ring last. However, Tarver refused to budge and the Nevada Athletic Commission stepped in and ordered the conflict be settled with a coin flip. When the time for the flip came, Jones relented and announced that he would allow Tarver to enter last.

== The fights ==
=== Undercard ===
The undercard featured unbeaten middleweight contender Jermain Taylor stop Rogelio Martinez in the 7th round.

=== Wright vs. Hernández ===
The chief support would see IBF Light middleweight champion Winky Wright face No. 6 ranked Ángel Hernández in the 4th defence of the title he won in October 2001.

==== The fight ====
Wright would dominate the bout, winning a wide unanimous decision, with judge Valerie Dorsett having it 119–109, Adalaide Byrd 118–110 and Chuck Giampa 117–111.

HBO's unofficial scorer Harold Lederman scored the bout 116–112 for Wright.

According to CompuBox Wright outlanded Hernández, landing with 253 of 768 punches thrown (33% connect rate) to 196 of 1,040 (19% connect rate) from Hernández.

Preceded by vs. Juan Carlos Candelo	Winky Wright's bouts 8 November 2003	Succeeded by vs. Shane Mosley
Preceded by vs. Victor Rosado	Ángel Hernández's bouts 8 November 2003	Succeeded by vs. Raymond Joval

=== Main Event ===
Jones appeared weakened and slower after dropping a significant amount of weight in order to get back down to the 175 pound light heavyweight limit, while Tarver performed a lot better than most people expected, but Jones was nevertheless able to pick up a disputed majority decision victory. Although Tarver landed more punches than Jones, Jones landed a higher percentage of his punches. Tarver landed 175 of his 506 thrown punches for a 35% success rate, while Jones landed 167 of his 406 thrown punches for a 41% success rate. It was Jones who landed the more power punches, landing 94 of his 252 power punches thrown (37%), while Tarver landed 73 of his 255 power punches thrown (29%). By the latter part of the fight, Tarver had done noticeable damage to Jones' face as his left eye was swelled and he was bleeding from the nose. The fight then went to the judges' scorecards. One judge had the bout even at 114–114, but the other two judges had Jones clearly ahead with scores of 117–111 and 116–112.

The Las Vegas crowd, thinking Tarver had done enough to win the fight, loudly booed after Michael Buffer announced the decision and chanted "bullshit" as Jones remained in the ring for his post-fight interview with Larry Merchant. Tarver also felt that he had defeated Jones and told Merchant "All you have to do is look at his face to know I won", while Jones told Merchant that Tarver was looking to steal rounds with well-timed flurries and that he (Jones) had landed the harder and cleaner shots, especially to the body. Unofficial HBO judge Harold Lederman scored the fight 116–112 for Jones, while the two BBC commentators John Rawling and Duke McKenzie had the fight respectively as a 114–114 draw and 115–113 for Tarver, with Rawling only having it a draw after giving Rounds 11 and 12 to Jones. Commenting on the judges' scorecards, Rawling said on commentary that he could understand 114–114, while calling the 116–112 and 117–111 scorecards for Jones a "complete disgrace", especially the 117–111.

Both the Associated Press and the New York Daily News scored the fight a 114–114 draw. Ring Magazine scored the fight 116–114 for Jones.

== Aftermath ==
In his post-fight interview, Jones announced that the fight against Tarver would be his last fight at light-heavyweight and that he wanted to fight one more time at heavyweight with Mike Tyson as his opponent, and then retire. When questioned on what he would do if the fight against Tyson didn't happen, Jones said that he would retire straight away. As Jones was still the reigning WBA heavyweight champion, he had until February 20, 2004 to decide if he would return to heavyweight to defend the title. Ultimately, as the fight against Tyson fell through and with other options at heavyweight not being as attractive as he'd like, Jones decided to vacate the WBA heavyweight title and he eventually agreed to a rematch with Tarver at light-heavyweight, instead of retiring.

== Undercard ==
Confirmed bouts:

Winner	Loser	Weight division/title belt(s) disputed	Result
(United States) Ronald Wright	(Mexico) Ángel Hernández	IBF World Light middleweight title	Unanimous decision
(United States) Jermain Taylor	(Dominican Republic) Rogelio Martinez	Middleweight (10 rounds)	7th round TKO
Non-TV bouts
(Mexico) Saul Montana	(United States) Gabe Brown	WBC Continental Americas Heavyweight title	1st round TKO
(Philippines) Vernie Torres	(Puerto Rico) Miguel Del Valle	vacant USBA Super Flyweight title	Unanimous decision
(United States) Robert Allen	(United States) Steve Walker	Middleweight (10 rounds)	1st round TKO
(United States) Marteze Logan	(United States) Lemuel Nelson	Welterweight (8 rounds)	Split decision
(United States) Ricardo Williams Jr	(United States) Derrick Wilmore	Welterweight (6 rounds)	Unanimous decision
(United States) Julian Townsend	(Mexico) Eddy Cota	Light middleweight (4 rounds)	Unanimous decision

== Broadcasting ==
Country	Broadcaster
Australia	Main Event
United Kingdom	BBC (Delayed)
United States	HBO

Preceded by vs. John Ruiz	Roy Jones Jr.'s bouts 8 November 2003	Succeeded by Rematch
Preceded by vs. Montell Griffin	Antonio Tarver's bouts 8 November 2003	Succeeded by Rematch
