= Round One: The Album =

Studio album by Roy Jones Jr.
- Released: February 26, 2002
- Recorded: 2001
- Genres: Hip hop, Southern hip hop
- Label: Body Head Entertainment
- Producers: Carlos Broady, Fury, Mr Lee

Singles from Round One: The Album
- 1. "That Was Then" Released: 2002

Round One: The Album is the only studio album released by the former four division boxing champion, Roy Jones Jr. The album features the single "That Was Then" which peaked at number 2 on the Hot Rap Singles chart and number 57 on the Hot R&B/Hip-Hop Singles & Tracks chart in the U.S. Roy Jones Jr. would go on to release a second album with the group Body Head Bangerz, titled Body Head Bangerz: Volume One.

== Track listing ==
Title	Producer(s)	Featured guest(s)	Time
"Who Wanna Get Knocked Out?"	Roy Jones Jr.		2:15
"Ya'll Must've Forgot"	Mr Lee		2:47
"And Still"	Roy Jones Jr.		4:28
"Is There Anybody Out There"	Roy Jones Jr.	Johnny Augustus & Kevil Vageda	3:47
"You Damn Right"	Roy Jones Jr.	Hahz The Rippa & Ms. Diamond	3:28
"Get Started"	Roy Jones Jr.	Mystikal & 2-4	3:47
"Unfaithful"	Roy Jones Jr.	Hahz The Rippa, Ms. Diamond, Thrill The Playa & The Fraternity	5:51
"You Don't Wanna Go There"	Roy Jones Jr.	Johnny Augustus	3:55
"Get It, Get It"	Roy Jones Jr.		4:48
"If You Need A Man"	Roy Jones Jr.	Hahz The Rippa	3:43
"I Told Ya'll"	Roy Jones Jr.	Dorasel	3:33
"That Was Then"	Roy Jones Jr.	Dave Hollister, Perion, Hahz The Rippa	4:20
"Here I Come"	Roy Jones Jr.	2-4	5:08
"Invincible"	Mr Lee	Scarface	3:01
"Do You Know How It Feels"	Roy Jones Jr.		4:21
"A Real Father"	Roy Jones Jr.		3:40
"We All We Got"	Roy Jones Jr.	Hahz The Rippa	3:18
"I Pray"	Roy Jones Jr.	Katrina Washington	3:38
"Just Me"	Roy Jones Jr.	Perion	3:53

== Charts ==
Chart (2002)	Peak position
US Top Heatseekers	34
US Top R&B/Hip-Hop Albums	50
