= John Ruiz vs. Roy Jones Jr. =

Boxing match

Hard Road to Glory
- Date: March 1, 2003
- Venue: Thomas & Mack Center, Paradise, Nevada, U.S.
- Title(s) on the line: WBA heavyweight title

Tale of the tape
Boxer	John Ruiz	Roy Jones Jr.
Nickname	The Quietman	Junior
Hometown	Chelsea, Massachusetts, U.S.	Pensacola, Florida, U.S.
Purse		$10,000,000
Pre-fight record	38–4–1 (27 KO)	47–1 (38 KO)
Age	31 years, 1 month	34 years, 1 month
Height	6 ft 2 in (188 cm)	5 ft 11 in (180 cm)
Weight	226 lb (103 kg)	193 lb (88 kg)
Style	Orthodox	Orthodox
Recognition	WBA; Heavyweight Champion; The Ring; No. 5 Ranked Heavyweight	WBA (Super), WBC, IBF, IBO and The Ring undisputed Light Heavyweight Champion; The Ring No. 2 ranked pound-for-pound fighter 3-division world champion

Result
- Jones Jr. wins via 12–round unanimous decision (116–112, 117–111, 118–110)

John Ruiz vs. Roy Jones Jr., billed as Hard Road to Glory, was a professional boxing match contested on March 1, 2003, for the WBA heavyweight championship. The fight took place at the Thomas & Mack Center on the campus of UNLV in Paradise, Nevada.

== Background ==
Late in 2002 Jones, who had already been a world champion at middleweight and super middleweight in addition to his light heavyweight title reign, announced he was going to move up to the heavyweight division to challenge Ruiz for the WBA championship. Jones had become a star in the light heavyweight division and at the time of his match with Ruiz, held titles from seven different boxing organizations. Ruiz's promoter Don King had spent much of 2002 negotiating with Jones in an effort to get him to agree to move up to heavyweight and challenge Ruiz. In November 1997 he had given up his light heavyweight title in order to move up to heavyweight with a $6,000,000 deal to face former undisputed champion Buster Douglas on the table. Ultimately however Jones's father convinced him to stay at light heavyweight, telling him he was "risking his life" by fighting Douglas.

Ruiz, meanwhile, had fought twice since winning the WBA championship from Holyfield. The first was a third fight with the former undisputed world champion, which ended in a split draw. In the second fight, which took place on July 27, 2002, in Las Vegas, was against unbeaten Canadian contender Kirk Johnson. Ruiz was fouled multiple times during the course of the ten round contest and won after referee Joe Cortez disqualified Johnson.

Jones accepted an offer that guaranteed him $10 million. Ruiz, however, received no guaranteed money and instead agreed to take a share of the pay-per-view profits. This led to some bad blood between the two sides as Ruiz accused Jones of under-promoting the fight.

Ruiz was making the third defense of the title he won in 2001 from Evander Holyfield, while Jones was trying to become only the second reigning world light heavyweight champion to win a heavyweight championship after Michael Spinks; he was also looking to join Spinks and Bob Fitzsimmons as the only fighters to win titles at heavyweight and light heavyweight and would match Fitzsimmons as the only other fighter to win titles at heavyweight and middleweight.

== The fights ==
=== Undercard ===
The preliminary bouts included wins for Al Cole, Lamon Brewster and Sherman Williams. Also Alejandro García stopped Santiago Samaniego to win his WBA (Regular) Light middleweight belt.

=== Mormeck vs. Gurov ===
Jean-Marc Mormeck vs. Alexander Gurov
- Title(s) on the line: WBA cruiserweight title

Tale of the tape
Boxer	Jean-Marc Mormeck	Alexander Gurov
Hometown	Pantin, Île-de-France, France	Mariupol, Donetsk Oblast, Ukraine
Pre-fight record	28–2 (20 KO)	31–3–1 (26 KO)
Age	30 years, 8 months	31 years, 10 months
Height	5 ft 11 in (180 cm)	6 ft 5 in (196 cm)
Weight	187 1/2 lb (85 kg)	188 1/2 lb (86 kg)
Style	Orthodox	Southpaw
Recognition	WBA; Cruiserweight Champion; The Ring; No. 3 Ranked Cruiserweight	WBA; No. 1 Ranked Cruiserweight; The Ring; No. 9 Ranked Cruiserweight

Result
- Mormeck defeated Gurov by 8th round TKO

The first of three major world title bouts on the card saw WBA cruiserweight champion Jean-Marc Mormeck faced No. 1 ranked contender Alexander Gurov, in the second defence of the belt he had won against Virgil Hill. This was Mormeck's U.S. debut having spent all but one fight of his career in Europe.

==== The fight ====
After a slow start, Mormeck made use of his jab to take control of the action, wearing Gurov down with hard right hands. Mormeck was able to back Gurov into ropes on a number of occasions before landing heavy blows on the challenger. In the 7th round whist in the corner a right hand staggered Gurov, causing referee Kenny Bayless to perform a standing 8 counts (as only the ropes stopped Gurov from going down). Mormeck continue strong in the 8th, landing a clean hard combination to the head in early on, which prompted the referee to wave the bout off.

At the time of the stoppage two of the three judges had Gurov ahead 67–65, while the other judge had Mormeck ahead 68–66.

Preceded by vs. Dale Brown	Jean-Marc Mormeck's bouts 1 March 2003	Succeeded by vs. Virgil Hill II
Preceded by vs. Patrick Madzinga	Alexander Gurov's bouts 1 March 2003	Succeeded by vs. Ivan Dubin

=== Wright vs. Candelo ===
Winky Wright vs. Juan Carlos Candelo
- Title(s) on the line: IBF light middleweight title

Tale of the tape
Boxer	Ronald Wright	Juan Carlos Candelo
Nickname	"Winky"	"J.C."
Hometown	St. Petersburg, Florida, U.S.	Buenaventura, Valle del Cauca, Colombia
Pre-fight record	44–3 (25 KO)	25–4–3 (17 KO)
Age	31 years, 3 months	29 years, 1 month
Height	5 ft 10 in (178 cm)	5 ft 11 in (180 cm)
Weight	153 1/2 lb (70 kg)	153 lb (69 kg)
Style	Southpaw	Orthodox
Recognition	IBF; Light Middleweight Champion; The Ring; No. 1 Ranked Light Middleweight	IBF; No. 1 Ranked Light Middleweight

Result
- Wright defeats Candelo by unanimous decision

The second world title on the card saw IBF Light middleweight champion Winky Wright face mandatory challenger Juan Carlos Candelo.

==== The fight ====
Wright would establishing his jab early and use movement to frustrate Candelo, who would spend the bout trying to put pressure on the champion. The 4th round would see the challenger a left uppercut during an exchange that appear to momentary hurt the champion, however he would quickly recover before controlling much of the rest of the bout.

At the end of 12 rounds all three judges scored the bout for Wright with two scores of 117–111 and one of 118–110. HBO's unofficial scorer Harold Lederman scored the bout 115–113 for Wright.

According to CompuBox Wright outlanded Candelo, landing with 283 of 907 punches thrown (31.2% connect rate) to 175 of 1,108 (15.8% connect rate) from Candelo.

==== Aftermath ====
Speaking after the bout Wright said "He was tough, and I'm glad he was tough. It'll make me more ready when I face De La Hoya. He was tough and he was slippery. He deserved to be a No. 1 contender."

Preceded by vs. Bronco McKart III	Winky Wright's bouts 1 March 2003	Succeeded by vs. Ángel Hernández
Preceded by vs. Ángel Hernández	Juan Carlos Candelo's bouts 1 March 2003	Succeeded by vs. Julio Garcia

=== Oquendo vs. Harris ===
The final support bout saw heavyweight contenders Fres Oquendo (IBF:4th, WBA:6th, WBA 10th) and Maurice Harris (IBF:8th) faceoff in an IBF elimination bout.

==== The fight ====
Harris would use his jab to prevent Oquendo from frequently landing his overhand right and was able to land a number of overhand rights of his own. In the 4th round a right-left combination from Oquendo sent Harris down. He beat the count and survived the round. Over the next few rounds Harris would get the better of the action until a left hook in the 10th dropped Harris again and referee Joe Cortez waved it off before completing the count, giving Oquendo a TKO victory.

At the time of the stoppage all three judges had Harris ahead 86–84. HBO's unofficial scorer Harold Lederman had the bout scored 85–85.

==== Aftermath ====
At the post-fight conference Oquendo would say "People know now that I am not only a slick boxer with a soft punch. I can punch as well. I have been in there with fighters with dangerous records and have survived. I knew I could survive him."

Oquendo's victory set him up for a shot at IBF champion Chris Byrd.

Preceded by vs. George Arias	Fres Oquendo's bouts 1 March 2003	Succeeded by vs. Chris Byrd
Preceded by vs. Sergei Liakhovich	Maurice Harris's bouts 1 March 2003	Succeeded by vs. Franklin Edmondson

=== Main Event ===
Despite giving up a lot of height and weight to Ruiz, Jones dominated most of the fight. Jones used his superior boxing skills and hand speed to his advantage and used timely jabs and uppercuts against Ruiz, who was unable to land a sustained amount of offense, only connecting with 89 of 433 thrown punches for a dismal 21% success rate. By round four Jones' punches caused Ruiz's nose to bleed, which hindered Ruiz for the remainder of the fight.

The fight went the full 12 rounds with neither man being able to score a knockdown. The official judges' scorecards were one-sided in Jones' favor and he secured a unanimous decision victory with scores of 118–110, 117–111 and 116–112.

Unofficial HBO judge Harold Lederman scored the fight 119–109 for Jones, while the Associated Press scored the fight 116–112 for Jones.

== Aftermath ==
After the fight, it was not known if Jones was going to continue to fight in the heavyweight division or return to the light heavyweight division. As a result, the WBA named Jones the "champion in recess" and gave him until February 20, 2004, to defend the title. The WBC and IBF, meanwhile, stripped Jones of their light heavyweight championships.

Jones indeed returned to light heavyweight on November 8, 2003, to challenge Antonio Tarver, who had won the WBC and IBF light heavyweight titles that Jones had vacated (Tarver would vacate the IBF title prior to his fight with Jones, however). Jones appeared weak and sluggish after dropping 24 pounds since the night of his fight against Ruiz, but Jones nevertheless picked up the majority decision victory over Tarver to regain the WBC light heavyweight title, becoming the first reigning heavyweight champion to move down and win a light heavyweight title. Though there were rumours of potential heavyweight matchups with Lennox Lewis, Evander Holyfield and especially with Mike Tyson, Jones decided to remain in the light heavyweight division after the Tyson fight fell through, and officially vacated the WBA heavyweight title on February 20, 2004.

Prior to Jones' vacating the title, Ruiz met former WBC and IBF heavyweight champion Hasim Rahman for the "interim" WBA heavyweight championship on December 13, 2003. Ruiz would earn the victory by unanimous decision and following Jones relinquishing his title in February, became recognized as the official WBA heavyweight champion. He would defend the title twice more successfully against Fres Oquendo and Andrew Golota. In 2005, Ruiz initially lost the WBA title to another former middleweight champion in James Toney, but after Toney failed a post fight drug test the result was changed to a no contest and Ruiz remained champion. He would lose the title in his next fight to Nikolai Valuev.

== Undercard ==
Confirmed bouts:

Winner	Loser	Weight division/title belt(s) disputed	Result
(Puerto Rico) Fres Oquendo	(United States) Maurice Harris	IBF Heavyweight title eliminator	10th-round TKO
(United States) Ronald Wright	(Colombia) Juan Carlos Candelo	IBF World Light middleweight title	Unanimous decision
(France) Jean-Marc Mormeck	(Ukraine) Alexander Gurov	WBA World Cruiserweight title	8th-round TKO
Non-TV bouts
(The Bahamas) Sherman Williams	(United States) Gabe Brown	Heavyweight (10 rounds)	Unanimous decision
(United States) Vonda Ward	(United States) Martha Salazar	Heavyweight (4 rounds)	Split Decision
(United States) Lamon Brewster	(United States) Joe Lenart	Heavyweight (10 rounds)	3rd-round TKO
(United States) Ezra Sellers	(United States) Jason Robinson	Cruiserweight (8 rounds)	2nd-round TKO
(Mexico) Alejandro García	(Panama) Santiago Samaniego	WBA (Regular) Light middleweight title	3rd-round TKO
(United States) Al Cole	(Nigeria) David Izon	Heavyweight (8 rounds)	Unanimous decision

== Broadcasting ==
Country	Broadcaster
Australia	Main Event
Ireland & United Kingdom	Setanta Sport
Philippines	RPTV
United States	HBO

Preceded by vs. Kirk Johnson	John Ruiz's bouts 1 March 2003	Succeeded by vs. Hasim Rahman
Preceded by vs. Clinton Woods	Roy Jones Jr.'s bouts 1 March 2003	Succeeded by vs. Antonio Tarver
