= World Boxing Foundation =

Professional boxing organization

- Abbreviation: WBF
- Formation: 1988
- Type: Non-profit institution
- Purpose: Boxing sanctioning organization
- Headquarters: Australia
- Region served: Worldwide
- Website: www.worldboxingfoundation.com

The World Boxing Foundation (WBF) is a Australian based corporation that sanctions professional boxing matches and awards world and regional championships.

It is an independent organization not recognized by the "big four" governing bodies (WBA, WBC, IBF and WBO), who only recognize each other in their rankings and title unification rules.

== History ==
The WBF traces its history back to 1988 when it was originally founded as the World Boxing Federation in Bristol, Tennessee, by Larry Carrier and Ron Scalf.

Following legal disputes and restructuring around 2004, Australian property developer Mick Croucher took over operations and shifted the headquarters to Melbourne, Australia, rebranding it as the World Boxing Foundation.

It sanctions global, regional, intercontinental, and female championship bouts, frequently acting as a developmental or stepping-stone platform for fighters aiming toward major world titles.

== Notable past champions ==
- Francois Botha
- Joe Bugner
- George Foreman
- Peter Graham
- Samson Dutch Boy Gym
- Evander Holyfield
- Roy Jones Jr.
- Johnny Nelson
- Robin Reid
- Antonio Tarver
- Jimmy Thunder

== See also ==
- List of boxing organisations
