= Glen Kelly (boxer) =

Australian boxer

Personal information
- Nickname: Kunga
- Nationality: Australian
- Born: Glen Kelly; 8 March 1971 (age 55) La Perouse, Sydney, Australia
- Height: 5 ft 11 in (180 cm)
- Weight: Light heavyweight, Cruiserweight

Boxing career
- Reach: 71 in (180 cm)
- Stance: Orthodox

Boxing record
- Total fights: 35
- Wins: 31
- Win by KO: 17
- Losses: 3
- Draws: 1

Glen Kelly (born 8 March 1971 in La Perouse, New South Wales) is an Indigenous Australian professional boxer. The pinnacle of Kelly's boxing career came in 2002, when he unsuccessfully challenged Roy Jones Jr for the WBC, WBA, IBF, IBO, WBF and IBA light heavyweight World titles. Kelly, who came in undefeated, was knocked out in the seventh round.

== Career ==
Kelly won the New South Wales light-heavyweight title in 1996, before winning the Australian Light Heavyweight title the following year and the IBF Pan Pacific light heavyweight title (against Anthony Bigeni) in 1999. he defended them titles against Sam Soliman before relinquished his Australian titles to fight in USA, beating Billy Lewis for the IBF Inter-Continental light heavyweight title in 2000. Kelly then moved to be trained by former world champion, Jeff Fenech. His biggest fight was against Roy Jones Jr. for the WBC, WBA, IBF, IBO, WBF and IBA light heavyweight World titles in 2002. Kelly was outclassed by Jones, being knocked out in the seventh round. His final fight was against David Haye in 2005 which he lost by TKO in the 2nd round.

== Professional boxing record ==
35 fights	31 wins	3 losses
By knockout	17	3
By decision	14	0
Draws	1	

No.	Result	Record	Opponent	Type	Round, time	Date	Location	Notes
35	Loss	31–3–1	(United Kingdom) David Haye	TKO	2 (10), 1:09	4 March 2005	(United Kingdom) Magna Centre, Rotherham, Yorkshire	
34	Win	31–2–1	(China) Kariz Kariuki	UD	12	8 August 2004	(China) Xi Cang Prefectural Arena, Xi Cang	Retained OPBF Cruiserweight Title
33	Win	30–2–1	(Argentina) Luis Oscar Ricail	TKO	6 (10), 2:15	23 January 2004	(Australia) Panthers World of Entertainment, Penrith, New South Wales	
32	Win	29–2–1	(Australia) Simon Paterson	UD	12	13 April 2003	(Australia) Carrara Sports Complex, Carrara, Gold Coast, Queensland	Won vacant OPBF Cruiserweight Title, Won IBF Pan-Pacific Cruiserweight Title
31	Loss	28–2–1	(Australia) Paul Briggs	TKO	4 (12)	18 September 2002	(Australia) Hordern Pavilion, Moore Park, New South Wales	For OPBF Light Heavyweight Title
30	Loss	28–1–1	(United States) Roy Jones Jr.	KO	7 (12), 1:55	2 February 2002	(United States) American Airlines Arena, Miami, Florida	For WBA, WBC, IBF, IBO, WBF, IBA, and The Ring; Light Heavyweight titles
29	Win	28–0–1	(Australia) Jamie Wallace	UD	8	3 August 2001	(Australia) Bellevue Function Centre, Sydney	
28	Win	27–0–1	(Fiji) Sakeasi Dakua	TKO	3 (10)	29 June 2001	(Australia) Bellevue Function Centre, Sydney	
27	Win	26–0–1	(United States) Billy Lewis	TKO	10 (10), 2:17	24 February 2001	(United States) Ice Palace, Tampa, Florida	
26	Win	25–0–1	(United States) Billy Lewis	TKO	7 (12), 2:17	7 September 2000	(United States) Grand Casino, Gulfport, Mississippi	IBF Light Heavyweight Title Eliminator, Won vacant IBF Inter-Continental Light Heavyweight title
25	Win	24–0–1	(Fiji) Mosese Sorovi	UD	12	17 March 2000	(Australia) Merrylands Bowling Club, Sydney	Retained Australian Light Heavyweight title
24	Win	23–0–1	(United States) Laverne Clark	TKO	6 (10)	22 November 1999	(Australia) Hurstville Civic Centre, Sydney	
23	Win	22–0–1	(Australia) Sam Soliman	UD	12	28 September 1999	(Australia) District Junior Rugby League, Sydney	Retained IBF Pan Pacific Light Heavyweight Title, Retained Australian Light Heavyweight title
22	Win	21–0–1	(Australia) Anthony Bigeni	PTS	12	4 June 1999	(Australia) Alexandria Basketball Stadium, Sydney	Retained IBF Pan Pacific Light Heavyweight Title
21	Win	20–0–1	(Uganda) John Mugabi	TKO	8 (12)	16 January 1999	(Australia) Alexandria Basketball Stadium, Sydney	Retained IBF Pan Pacific Light Heavyweight Title, Retained Australian Light Heavyweight title
20	Win	19–0–1	(New Zealand) Sam Leuii	TKO	7 (12)	27 August 1998	(Australia) District Junior Rugby League, Sydney	Won vacant IBF Pan Pacific Light Heavyweight Title
19	Win	18–0–1	(Australia) John Wyborn	TKO	3 (10)	24 April 1998	(Australia) Bankstown Sports Club, Sydney	

== Personal life ==
His brother is also a professional boxer Kevin Kelly

he is married to Tracy Kelly and they have 5 kids together. they have been together for over 20 years.
