= Jay Nady =

American boxer

Personal information
- Born: Jay Nady; August 23, 1947 (age 79) Dubuque, Iowa, U.S.
- Height: 6 ft 5 in (1.96 m)

Boxing career

Jay Nady (/ˈneɪdi/ NAY-dee; born August 23, 1947) is an American former boxing referee and the uncle of former Major League Baseball outfielder Xavier Nady.

== Biography ==
Nady boxed and played football at the University of Nevada, Reno in the 1960s. For his accomplishments on the field and in the ring, he was inducted into the UNR Hall of Fame in 1986.

Nady's refereeing career also started at the University of Nevada. In 1970 he began refereeing amateur boxing. Nady earned his professional license in 1972 and officiated close to 2,500 boxing matches until his retirement in 2019.

Nady served in the U.S. Army from 1971 to 1972 as a 2nd lieutenant, and was discharged from the reserves as a captain in 1978.

Nady served a member of the Nevada State Athletic Commission, appointed by then Governor Richard Bryan. Although he maintained his refereeing credentials, he did not officiate during his three-year appointment, and resigned his commission early to resume his ring duties.

A close friend of boxing referee Mills Lane, Nady served as the manager for Lane's successful campaign for district attorney and judge in Reno, Nevada.

Nady had a stool thrown at him by Zab Judah after a stoppage. This action, along with various other attempted assaults on the referee, earned Judah a temporary license suspension.
