= Quadruple champion =

Winner of four sports titles

A quadruple champion, also known as a grand slam champion, occurs in different sports when a competitor wins four crowns, titles, medals, belts or another distinction. The definition varies depending on the sport.

== Boxing ==
In boxing, a quadruple champion is a boxer who has won world titles in four different weight classes.

The first ever man to earn that enormous distinction was Thomas Hearns on October 29, 1987. Hearns won his first four titles at the following divisions: welterweight (147 lbs), light middleweight (154 lbs), middleweight (160 lbs) and light heavyweight (175 lbs). By later winning a super middleweight title, he also became the first to win world titles in five weight divisions.

The second man was Sugar Ray Leonard, who on November 7, 1988, won his first championships at welterweight (147 lbs), light middleweight (154 lbs), middleweight (160 lbs), super middleweight (168 lbs) and light heavyweight (175 lbs). There are five titles in five divisions but his case is extremely rare: Leonard fought for two different belts in two different weight divisions the same night: Super middleweight (168 lbs) and light heavyweight (175 lbs) against Donny Lalonde so any of the titles can be attached as his fourth title.

Leo Gámez was the first boxer to win titles in four of the lightest divisions from mini flyweight (105 lbs), light flyweight (108 lbs), flyweight (112 lbs) to super flyweight (115 lbs), having accomplished the feat on October 9, 2000.

== Motor racing ==
Alain Prost, Max Verstappen, Lewis Hamilton and Sebastian Vettel won four F1 world championships.

Juha Kankkunen and Tommi Mäkinen both won four World Rally Championships.

Yvan Muller is the only person to win four World Touring Car Championships.

Olivier Gendebien, Henri Pescarolo and Yannick Dalmas have all won the Le Mans 24 hour race four times.

== MMA and other combat sports ==
Cris Cyborg is the only fighter, male or female, to become a Quadruple Champion in MMA, winning belts in the UFC, Bellator MMA, Invicta FC and Strikeforce (mixed martial arts).

The Grand Slam in Brazilian jiu-jitsu is the achievement of winning all four major IBJJF tournaments in a calendar year.

For Combat Sports in general, a Grand Slam championship is when someone wins a championship in a striking art, grappling art, mixed martial arts and professional wrestling.

== See also ==
- List of boxing triple champions
- List of boxing quadruple champions
- List of boxing quintuple champions
- List of boxing sextuple champions
- List of boxing septuple champions
- List of boxing octuple champions
- List of The Ring world champions
- List of WBC world champions
- List of WBA world champions
- List of IBF world champions
- List of WBO world champions
- List of IBO world champions
