= Paul Jones (boxer) =

British boxer

Personal information
- Nickname: Silky
- Nationality: British
- Born: Paul Jones; 19 November 1966 (age 59) Sheffield, England
- Weight: Light Middleweight, Middleweight, Super Middleweight

Boxing career
- Stance: Orthodox

Boxing record
- Total fights: 44
- Wins: 31
- Win by KO: 11
- Losses: 12
- Draws: 1
- No contests: 0

Paul "Silky" Jones (born 19 November 1966 in Sheffield, England) is a former World Boxing Champion, nicknamed “Silky” for his quickness and defensive prowess. He has a combined professional record of 31-12-1 (11 KOs) in the welterweight, light-middleweight, middleweight, and super middleweight divisions. He defeated rugged American Verno Phillips for the Light Middleweight World Championship on 22 November 1995. Phillips would go on to achieve World Championship status three more times.

== Early years ==
Jones turned pro in 1986, winning his first professional bout against Paul Gillings. Jones then participated in 4 more fights before moving to Toronto in order to gain experience, where he achieved 3 winning bouts including a 3rd-round KO against Tony Collier. Paul then returned to the UK and participated in 8 more fights before winning his first title against Jason Rowe. On 14 April 1995, Jones won the World Boxing Organization (WBO)'s Intercontinental title against Damien Denny, earning him the "KO of the year award". This then placed Jones as number 2 in the WBO rankings. Jones defended the title twice, remaining undefeated for more than 3 years.

== Capturing the Light Middleweight title ==
In 1995, Jones had a chance to compete for the championship. He entered the fight as the underdog but surprised the boxing world by winning the match. He won the WBO Light Middleweight title with a majority decision win over Verno Phillips, who later became the IBF Light Middleweight Champion. With the win, Jones became the first British-born Light Middleweight World Champion. Jones joined close friend and boxer Naseem Hamed as Sheffield's second world champion at the time. Hamed, who was also ringside for the fight, said, "Silkys' done the business tonight what a fight I knew he would win but not so easily". The plan was for Jones to defend his WBO title against Bronco Banyon McKart of Bob Arum's Top Rank promotions. Both parties had a verbal agreement for the bout to be staged either in the UK or America but it did not materialize. However, Jones did go on to win the WBC Super Middle Weight International World Title. Jones' last fight was a points decision over the future EBU–EE Super Middleweight champion Kreshnik Qato. Jones retired in 2002 with a record of 31-12-1.

== WBO controversy ==
In late 2014, it came to light via social media that Jones had never received his actual title belt from the World Boxing Organization. Some boxing fans began a trending campaign on Twitter with the hashtag #GetSilkyHisBelt. Jones was finally awarded his belt in Doncaster at an event staged by former trainer Ian Allcock and John Sheppard on 10 July 2015. After 20 years of fighting against the WBO and British Boxing Board of Control, the belt arrived in England.

Preceded by Verno Phillips	WBO light Middleweight Champion; 22 November 1995– February 1996; Stripped	Succeeded by Bronco McKart

== Junior middleweight ==
Name:	Date:	Location:	Defenses:
(United States) John David Jackson defeated Lupe Aquino	8 December 1988	Detroit, Michigan	6
Title vacated	1993	Jackson vacated the title to move up to Middleweight. His last defense was against Michele Mastrodonato on 19 December 1992 in San Severo, Italy	
(United States) Verno Phillips def. Lupe Aquino	30 October 1993	Phoenix, Arizona	4
(United Kingdom) Paul Jones	22 November 1995	Sheffield, England	0
Title vacated	February 1996	Jones was stripped of the title.	
(United States) Ronald "Winky" Wright	17 May 1996	Monroe, Michigan	3
(Namibia) Harry Simon	22 August 1998	Temba, South Africa	4
Title vacated	July 2001	Simon vacated the title to move up to Middleweight. His last defense was against Wayne Alexander on 10 February 2001 in Widnes, England	
(Puerto Rico) Daniel Santos defeated Luis "Yori Boy" Campas	16 March 2002	Las Vegas, Nevada	4
(Ukraine) Sergiy Dzindziruk	3 December 2005	Magdeburg, Germany	4

== Championships and accomplishments ==
- World Boxing Organization

- WBO Light Middleweight Championship
- WBO Inter-Continental Light Middleweight Championship
- 1995 World Boxing Organization Fighter of the Year
- 1995 World Boxing Organization KO of the year.

- World Boxing Council

- WBC International Super Middleweight Championship

- Commonwealth

- Commonwealth Middleweight Championship

- World records set in 2011- first ever boxer to commentate on a live boxing fight via YouTube.

== See also ==
- List of WBO world champions
