= Kassim Ouma =

Ugandan boxer (born 1978)

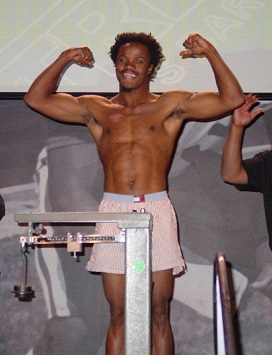
- Ouma in 2010

Personal information
- Nickname: The Dream
- Nationality: Ugandan
- Born: 12 December 1978 (age 47) Kampala, Uganda
- Weight: Light middleweight; Middleweight

Boxing career
- Stance: Southpaw

Boxing record
- Total fights: 49
- Wins: 29
- Win by KO: 18
- Losses: 18
- Draws: 1
- No contests: 1

Kassim Ouma (born 12 December, 1978 Gulu, Uganda) is a Ugandan professional boxer. He held the IBF junior middleweight title from 2004 to 2005, and has challenged twice for a world middleweight title in 2006 and 2011.

== Early life ==
Born into poverty, at the age of six he was displaced by war and he ended up under the protection of the then rebel forces National Resistance Army and consequently did not see his family for five years. Ouma is the 7th of 13 children, which include 7 brothers and 5 sisters. Only 4 brothers are still alive.

== Amateur career ==
Upon leaving the army, Ouma started boxing and amassed an amateur record of 62 wins and 3 losses. He made the Ugandan national boxing team and was selected to fight at the 1996 Summer Olympics in Atlanta, Georgia, but did not attend due to financial difficulties.

== Professional career ==
On a Ugandan national amateur team trip to the United States, Ouma decided to stay to undertake a career as a professional boxer to support his family in Uganda. Ouma later won the International Boxing Federation (IBF) Junior Middleweight world title.

Ouma is a former champion and top-level contender in the Light Middleweight division. He has quality wins against Jason Papillion, Juan Carlos Candelo, and Verno Phillips, his second win against whom earned him the IBF Light Middleweight title. Ouma successfully defended his championship with a twelve-round unanimous decision against Kofi Jantuah of Ghana. Ouma later lost this title in a unanimous decision defeat against Roman Karmazin, a bout in which Ouma was put to the canvas twice. It was only the second defeat of his career.

Since the Karmazin bout, Ouma has remained active in the Light Middleweight division, earning three wins, two by knockout. On May 6, 2006, Ouma defeated Marco Antonio Rubio by split decision despite being knocked down in the first round.

Ouma returned to the ring with an impressive win over undefeated fellow southpaw Sechew Powell August 5, 2006. Powell is from Brooklyn, NY and the fight took place at the Theatre of Madison Square Garden. The official scorecards were 90-100, 93-97, and 94-96 all in favor of Kassim Ouma by unanimous decision.

Ouma lost the middleweight title shot against Jermain Taylor on Dec. 9, 2006. Taylor's power and well-timed clenches kept Ouma from throwing as many punches as he usually does. Despite absorbing a large number of extremely hard shots, Ouma did not go down. The fight went the full 12 rounds, and Ouma lost by unanimous decision. The judges scored the fight 118-110, 117-111 and 115-113 for Taylor who was at home in Little Rock, Arkansas.

After the Taylor fight Ouma lost back to back close decisions to Saul Roman in October 2007 and Cornelius Bundrage in March 2008.

On September 25, 2010, Ouma stopped Joey Gilbert in the 6th round of their 10-round bout for the vacant NABA middleweight title at the Grand Sierra Resort in Reno, Nevada.

== Personal life ==
While in Uganda, he was never shot despite being in the army. However, after having moved to America, he was shot twice in Florida in December 2002. According to Ouma, his father was beaten to death by the Ugandan army in retaliation for his leaving of the country. A documentary entitled Kassim the Dream was made in 2008. It was an official selection at several film festivals.

== See also ==
- List of kidnappings
- List of solved missing person cases
- Ugandan Americans

== Professional boxing record ==
49 fights	29 wins	18 losses
By knockout	18	4
By decision	11	14
Draws	1	
No contests	1	

No.	Result	Record	Opponent	Type	Round, time	Date	Location	Notes
49	Loss	29–18–1 (1)	Fedor Michel	UD	6	25 May 2022	Felsenkeller, Traunreut, Germany	
48	Loss	29–17–1 (1)	Ryno Liebenberg	UD	8	26 Mar 2022	Westfalenhalle, Dortmund, Germany	
47	Loss	29–16–1 (1)	Ibrahima Diallo	RTD	4 (8), 3:00	4 Dec 2021	Sartory Saele, Cologne, Germany	
46	Loss	29–15–1 (1)	Tony Browne	UD	8	28 Mar 2021	Claridge Events, Brussels, Belgium	
45	Loss	29–14–1 (1)	Ashley Theophane	UD	10	5 Oct 2019	Gilleleje Hallen, Gilleleje, Denmark	
44	Loss	29–13–1 (1)	Fiodor Czerkaszyn	TKO	2 (8), 2:10	23 Mar 2019	Hala Sportowa im. Olimpijczykow, ul. Ksieznej Anny 18, Lomza, Poland	
43	Loss	29–12–1 (1)	Pavel Semjonov	UD	8	16 Nov 2018	Kalev, Tallinn, Estonia	
42	Loss	29–11–1 (1)	Ilias Essaoudi	UD	8	3 Dec 2017	Hamburg, Germany	
41	Loss	29–10–1 (1)	Kamil Szeremeta	UD	10	20 Aug 2016	Amfiteatr, Misdroy, Poland	
40	Win	29–9–1 (1)	Adam Katumwa	TKO	6 (8)	22 Apr 2016	Okapi Hotel Kigali, Rwanda	
39	Loss	28–9–1 (1)	Igor Selivanov	UD	8	29 Nov 2015	Club A2, Saint Petersburg, Russia	
38	Win	28–8–1 (1)	Rahman Mustafa Yusubov	UD	6	11 Dec 2013	EconoLodge, Allentown, Pennsylvania, US	
37	Loss	27–8–1 (1)	Gennady Golovkin	TKO	10 (12), 1:57	17 Jun 2011	Roberto Durán Arena, Panama City, Panama	For WBA (Regular) middleweight title
36	Win	27–7–1 (1)	Joey Gilbert	TKO	6 (10), 0:59	25 Sep 2010	Grand Sierra Resort, Reno, Nevada, US	Won vacant WBA–NABA middleweight title
35	Loss	26–7–1 (1)	Vanes Martirosyan	UD	10	16 Jan 2010	The Joint, Paradise, Nevada, US	For WBO–NABO and NABF light middleweight titles
34	Loss	26–6–1 (1)	Gabriel Rosado	SD	10	24 Apr 2009	Prudential Center, Newark, New Jersey, US	
33	Win	26–5–1 (1)	Martinus Clay	TKO	6 (10), 1:38	4 Oct 2008	32nd Street Armory, Philadelphia, Pennsylvania, US	
32	Loss	25–5–1 (1)	Cornelius Bundrage	UD	10	28 Mar 2008	Seneca Allegany Casino, Salamanca, New York, US	
31	Loss	25–4–1 (1)	Saúl Román	SD	10	2 Nov 2007	Morongo Casino Resort & Spa, Cabazon, California, US	
30	Loss	25–3–1 (1)	Jermain Taylor	UD	12	9 Dec 2006	Alltel Arena, North Little Rock, Arkansas, US	For WBC, WBO, and The Ring middleweight titles
29	Win	25–2–1 (1)	Sechew Powell	UD	10	5 Aug 2006	Madison Square Garden, New York City, New York, US	
28	Win	24–2–1 (1)	Marco Antonio Rubio	SD	12	6 May 2006	MGM Grand Garden Arena, Paradise, Nevada, US	Retained WBO–NABO light middleweight title
27	Win	23–2–1 (1)	Francisco Antonio Mora	TKO	8 (12), 2:34	27 Jan 2006	Desert Diamond Casino, Tucson, Arizona, US	Won vacant WBO–NABO light middleweight title
26	Win	22–2–1 (1)	Alfredo Cuevas	RTD	4 (10), 3:00	13 Oct 2005	Borgata Hotel Casino & Spa, Atlantic City, New Jersey, US	
25	Loss	21–2–1 (1)	Roman Karmazin	UD	12	14 Jul 2005	The Orleans, Paradise, Nevada, US	Lost IBF light middleweight title
24	Win	21–1–1 (1)	Kofi Jantuah	UD	12	29 Jan 2005	Boardwalk Hall, Atlantic City, New Jersey, US	Retained IBF light middleweight title
23	Win	20–1–1 (1)	Verno Phillips	UD	12	2 Oct 2004	Caesars Palace, Paradise, Nevada, US	Won IBF light middleweight title
22	Win	19–1–1 (1)	Juan Carlos Candelo	TKO	10 (12), 0:15	3 Jan 2004	Foxwoods Resort Casino, Ledyard, Connecticut, US	
21	Win	18–1–1 (1)	Carlos Bojorquez	TKO	8 (10), 0:35	22 Aug 2003	Silver Star Hotel & Casino, Choctaw, Mississippi, US	
20	Win	17–1–1 (1)	Ángel Hernández	SD	12	30 May 2003	Foxwoods Resort Casino, Ledyard, Connecticut, US	Won vacant USBA light middleweight title
19	NC	16–1–1 (1)	Darrell Woods	TKO	11 (12), 0:25	4 Oct 2002	Dover Downs, Dover, Delaware, US	USBA light middleweight title at stake; Originally a TKO win for Ouma, later ruled an NC after he failed a drug test
18	Win	16–1–1	Jason Papillion	RTD	8 (12), 3:00	10 May 2002	Dover Downs, Dover, Delaware, US	Won vacant USBA light middleweight title
17	Win	15–1–1	Michael Lerma	UD	10	15 Feb 2002	Museum of Art, Philadelphia, Pennsylvania, US	
16	Win	14–1–1	Pedro Ortega	RTD	4 (10), 3:00	13 Dec 2001	Mohegan Sun Arena, Montville, Connecticut, US	
15	Win	13–1–1	Verno Phillips	UD	10	29 Jun 2001	Magic Casino, Hankinson, North Dakota, US	
14	Win	12–1–1	Tony Marshall	UD	10	29 Jun 2001	Grand Casino, Gulfport, Mississippi, US	
13	Draw	11–1–1	James Coker	TD	2 (12), 1:46	26 Apr 2001	Hilton Anatole, Dallas, Texas, US	For vacant WBC Continental Americas light middleweight title; TD after Coker was cut from an accidental head clash
12	Win	11–1	Quvonchbek Toygonbayev	UD	6	13 Oct 2000	Foxwoods Resort Casino, Ledyard, Connecticut, US	
11	Win	10–1	Alex Bunema	RTD	4 (8), 3:00	4 May 2000	Dallas, Texas, US	
10	Loss	9–1	Agustin Silva	TKO	1 (4)	20 Nov 1999	Miccosukee Resort & Gaming, Miami, Florida, US	
9	Win	9–0	Angel Villegas	TKO	8 (8)	18 Jun 1999	Robert and Mary Montgomery Armory Art Center, West Palm Beach, Florida, US	
8	Win	8–0	Emiliano Valdez	PTS	6	30 Jan 1999	Miccosukee Resort & Gaming, Miami, Florida, US	
7	Win	7–0	Victor Ramos	TKO	5 (12), 2:50	15 Jan 1999	Order Sons of Italy, Lake Worth, Florida, US	Won vacant Florida light middleweight title
6	Win	6–0	Jerry Smith	TKO	3 (8), 2:37	20 Nov 1998	Southeastern Livestock Pavilion, Ocala, Florida, US	
5	Win	5–0	Rodney Weston	KO	1 (6), 2:54	7 Nov 1998	Order Sons of Italy, Lake Worth, Florida, US	
4	Win	4–0	Renan Reyes	KO	1 (6), 1:44	16 Oct 1998	War Memorial Auditorium, Fort Lauderdale, Florida, US	
3	Win	3–0	Joseph Ragusa	KO	1 (4), 0:27	12 Sep 1998	Order Sons of Italy, Lake Worth, Florida, US	
2	Win	2–0	Alton Madison	TKO	3 (4), 2:19	27 Jul 1998	Order Sons of Italy, Lake Worth, Florida, US	
1	Win	1–0	Napoleon Middlebrooks	TKO	1 (4), 1:20	10 Jul 1998	War Memorial Auditorium, Fort Lauderdale, Florida, US	

Sporting positions
Regional boxing titles
Vacant Title last held by Johnny Gutierrez	Florida light middleweight champion 15 January 1999 – April 2001; Vacated	Vacant Title next held by Inka Laleye
Vacant Title last held by Winky Wright	USBA light middleweight champion 10 May 2002 – October 2002; Stripped	Vacant Title next held by Himself
Vacant Title last held by Himself	USBA light middleweight champion 30 May 2003 – June 2003; Vacated	Vacant Title next held by Tybius Flowers
Vacant Title last held by Joe Wyatt	WBO–NABO light middleweight champion 27 January 2006 – December 2006; Vacated	Vacant Title next held by Charles Whittaker
Vacant Title last held by Renan St Juste	WBA–NABA light middleweight champion 25 September 2010 – May 2011; Vacated	Vacant Title next held by Andy Lee
World boxing titles
Preceded by Verno Phillips	IBF light middleweight champion 2 October 2004 – 14 July 2005	Succeeded by Roman Karmazin
