= Classic Guards (boxing style) =

Fighting Style

The Classic Guards (also known as the Basic Guards), consist of the modern Traditional Guard, Conventional Guard and the High Guard. These guards are based on, but are different than, the traditional Bare-knuckle boxing guard.

== Guards ==
The modern classic guards consist of the modern traditional guard, conventional guard and the high guard. These guards are a modern variation of the traditional bareknuckle boxing guard and were widely used after the Marquess of Queensberry Rules which forbid grappling techniques and made use of boxing gloves mandatory. The primary difference between the traditional bare-knuckle boxing guard and the modern traditional guard is that the traditional bare-knuckle boxing guard held the arms at an angle greater than 90 degrees compared to the modern traditional guard where the arms are held at 90 degree angles or less. Though these guards have vastly different uses.

The modern classic guards are often the first guards taught to boxers as the initial guard position is easy to learn and they are effective against haymakers, which is the type of punch many untrained fighters and beginners use often.

=== Traditional guard ===
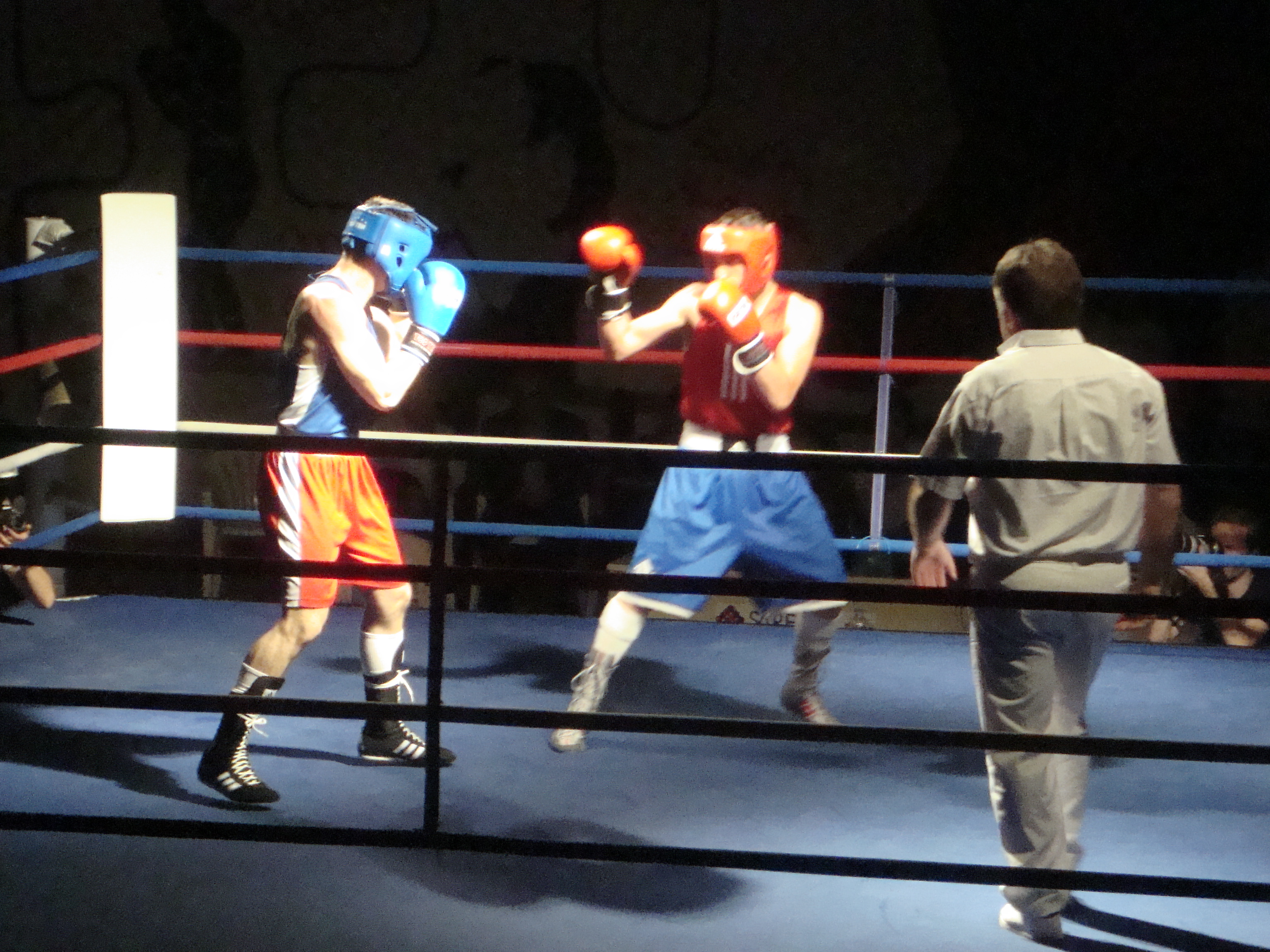
Boxer (right) using a traditional guard

The traditional guard in boxing consists of the lead arm bent at a 90 degree, or less, angle with the arm held away from the head and the hand in a closed fist. The rear arm is also held at a 90 degree, or less, angle but the closed fist is held next to the face usually near the chin and jaw but can also be held higher.

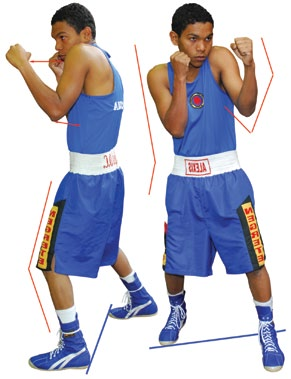
Boxer using a traditional guard

The advantages of the modern traditional guard are that the initial guard position is easy to learn, as it is just a matter of raising the arms. The slightly extended lead arm and rear arm placed on the chin, below eye level, gives the boxer better visibility than the other classic guards and creates distance. The bent position of the arms also allows boxers to punch with more power compared to the extended arms of the long guards.

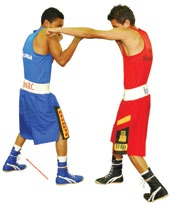
Boxer (left) using lead arm and high shoulder as passive defense against punch

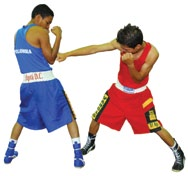
Boxer (left) using elbow of lead arm as passive defense against straight punch to side of body

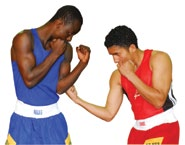
Boxer (left) using elbow of lead arm as passive defense against uppercut to side of body

The traditional guard also provides some limited relatively passive defense. The slightly extended lead arm creates distance making it more difficult for opponents to land short punches and the raised lead arm and shoulder acts as a barrier against punches to the lead side of the face, such as hooks, using the back of the gloves and forearms to absorb punches to head. The elbows are used to block straight punches, hooks and uppercuts to the sides of the body.

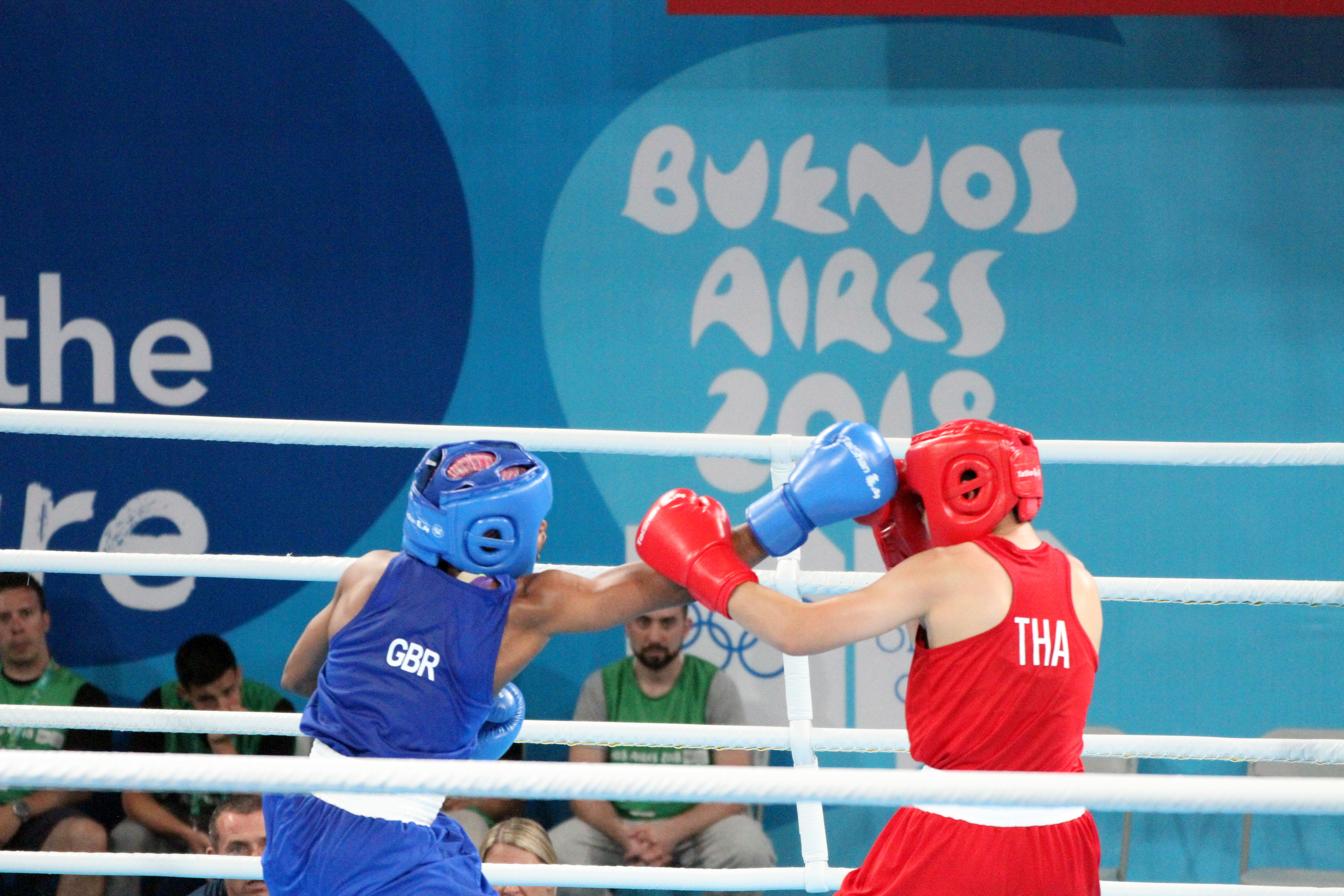
Boxer (left) landing a straight punch against opponent (right) using a traditional guard

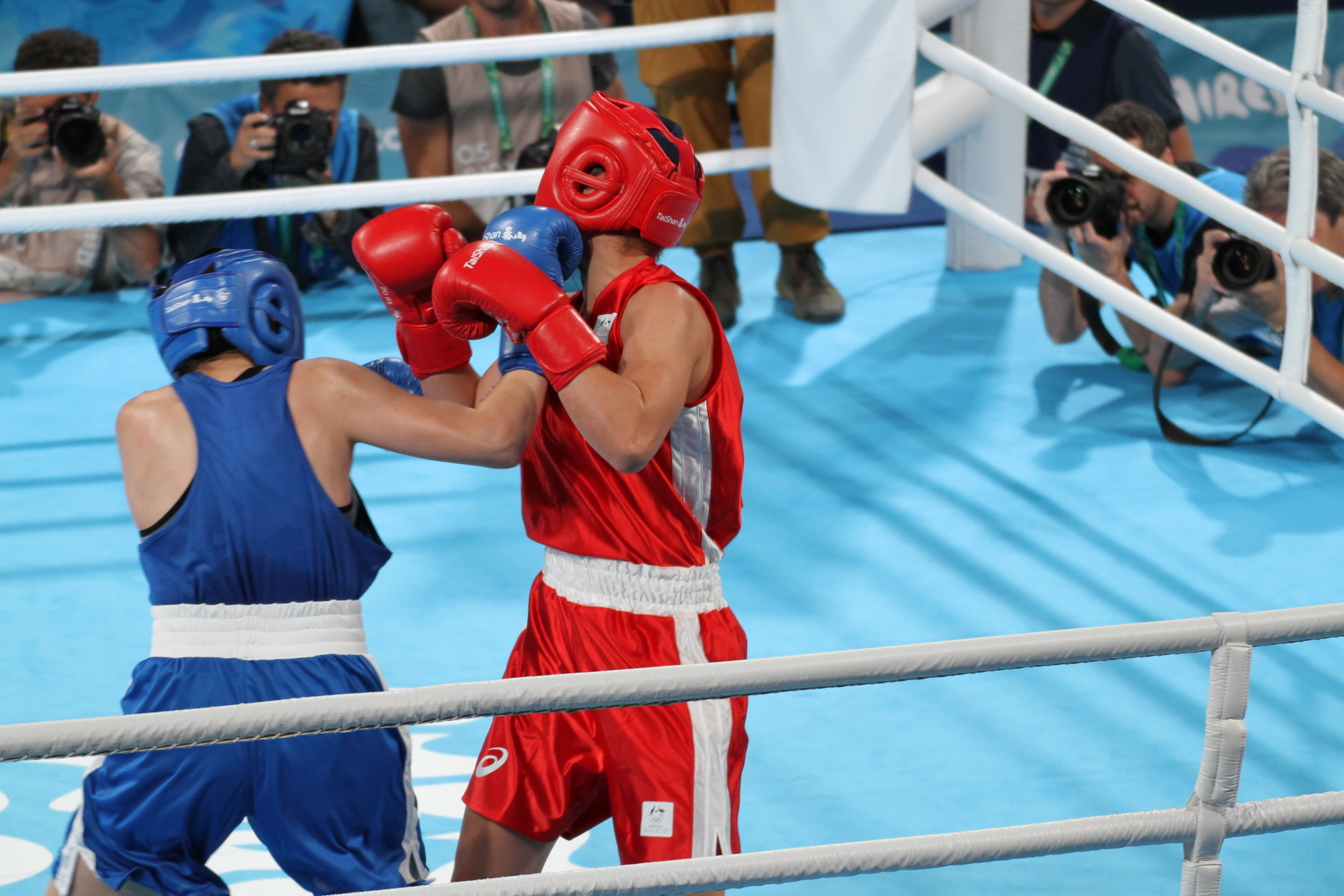
Boxer (left) landing an uppercut against opponent (right) using a traditional guard

The disadvantages of this guard are that it makes upper body lateral movement difficult. The hands held high also makes punches easy to see by the opponent. The traditional guard also leaves a space between the hands exposing the centerline, leaving the face down to the midsection open for attacks, and lacks passive defense against straight punches and uppercuts to the face and midsection. This requires active defense against these punches. Since straight punches are generally quicker than hooks this requires the boxer to have quick reflexes.

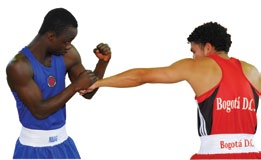
Boxer (left) using a parry against a straight punch to the midsection

The traditional guard active defenses generally require a high level of specificity. For example, when boxers are in a closed stance the traditional guard fighter would generally use his lead hand to parry a cross and his rear hand to parry a jab. Parrying a jab with the lead hand would expose the traditional guard boxer to a cross or rear hook from their opponent. This specificity makes this guard difficult to master. When a traditional guard boxer is in an open stance the lead hand would generally parry a jab and the rear hand would parry a cross. The traditional guard generally only provides one line of defense. For example, if a boxer from the closed stance is not quick enough to parry the jab with the rear hand they will be punched as there is not a second line of passive defense.

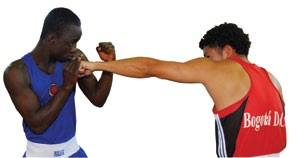
Boxer (left) using a punch catch against a straight punch in a closed stance

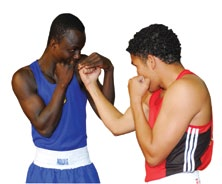
Boxer (left) using a punch catch against an uppercut in an open stance

Another traditional guard active defense is the punch catch which can be used against straight punches and uppercuts. Punch catches also generally require a high level of specificity. For example, when boxers are in a closed stance the traditional guard fighter would generally use his lead hand to punch catch a cross and his rear hand to punch catch a jab. Punch catching a jab with the lead hand would expose the traditional guard boxer to a cross or rear hook from their opponent. This specificity makes this guard difficult to master. The traditional guard generally only provides one line of defense. For example, if a boxer from the closed stance is not quick enough to punch catch the jab with the rear hand they will be punched as there is not a second line of passive defense.

The traditional guard also relies heavily on blocking with the hands. As the hands are also needed to punch this often puts the traditional guard boxer in the position of blocking first and then counterpunching before an opponent can reset to punch again.

The gap between the lead hand and the face also limits the ability to use this guard at close range. To ameliorate this, traditional guard boxers will often switch to a conventional guard or a high guard when their opponent closes the distance. This increases the level of difficulty for mastering the traditional guard as it is generally not a standalone guard, and other guards must be learned to compensate for its disadvantages.

=== Conventional Guard ===
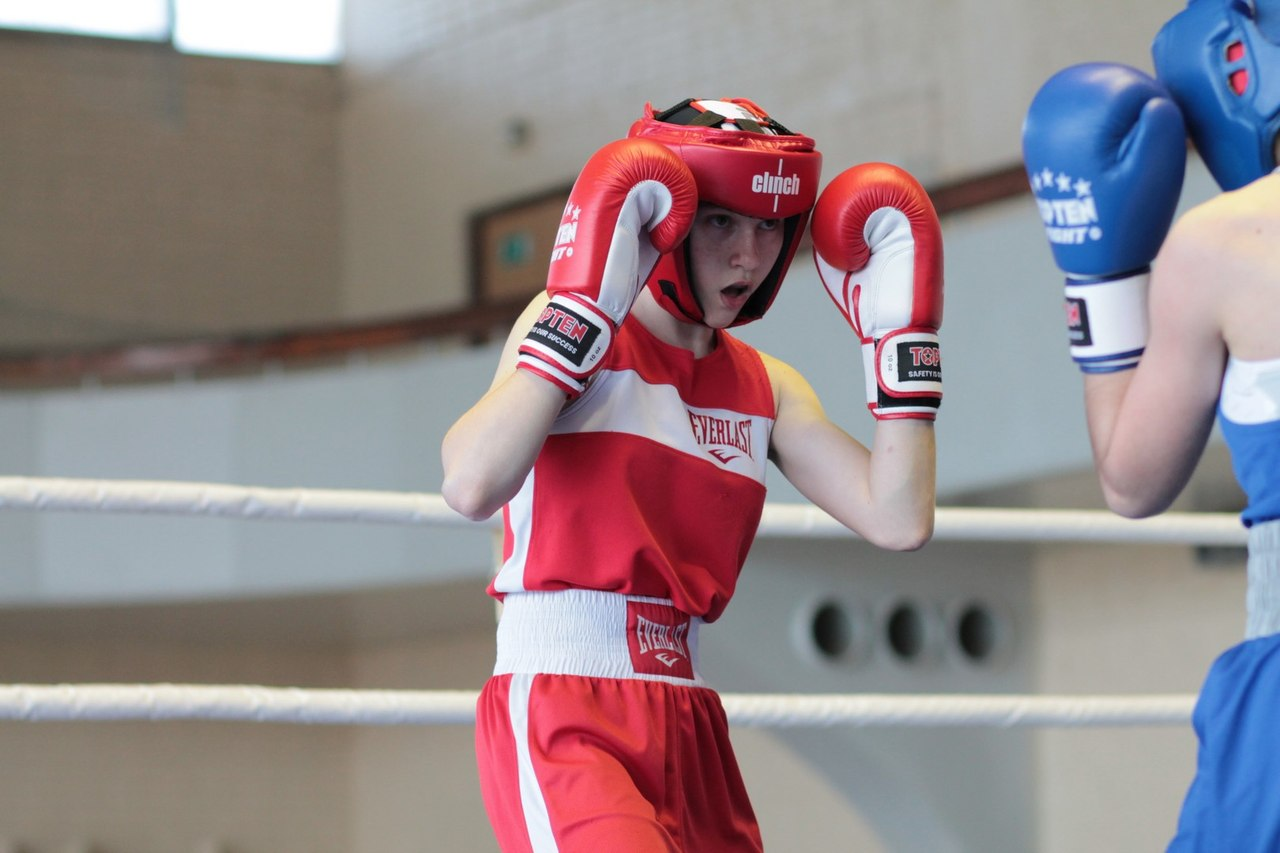
Boxer using a Conventional Guard

The conventional guard in boxing consists of the lead arm bent at a 90 degree, or less, angle with the arm held on the side of the head and the hand in a closed fist. The rear arm is also held at a 90 degree, or less, angle and the closed fist is also held next to the face usually at ear level or higher, but can also be held near the chin instead.

The advantages of the conventional guard are that the initial guard position is easy to learn, as it is just a matter of raising the arms. The bent position of the arms also allows boxers to punch with more power compared to the extended arms of the long guards.

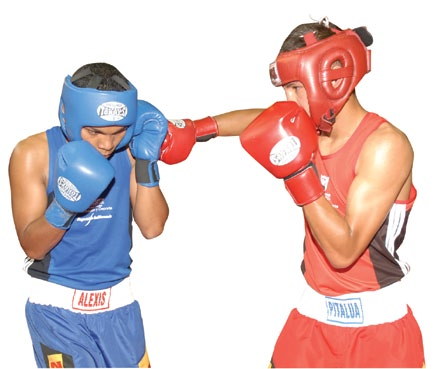
Boxer (left) using hook cover as passive defense

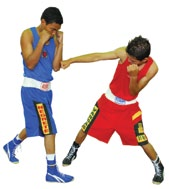
Boxer (left) using elbow as semi-passive defense against straight punch to side of body

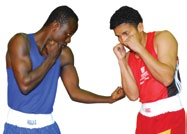
Boxer (left) using elbow as semi-passive defense against uppercut to side of body

The conventional guard puts both hands in the hook cover position to passively defend against hooks. It provides passive defense against hooks using the back of the gloves to absorb hook punches to head and semi-passive defense by slightly lowering the elbows to block hook punches to the body.

The lead hand being closer to the boxer's face gives them more time to parry straight punches and uppercuts. With the lead arm closer to the head this provides a fighter with slower reflexes better ability to block than from a traditional guard.

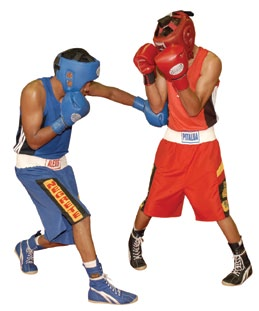
Boxer (right) hands at eye level raised elbows exposed to liver shot by boxer (left)

The disadvantages of the conventional guard are that the hands are generally held at eye level, or higher, which limits the boxer's visibility compared to the traditional guard. Keeping the hands at eye level also raises the elbows which exposes the boxer to punches to the body such as the liver shot. With the lead arm closer to the body it does not create the distance that the traditional guard does allowing opponents to close the distance more easily.

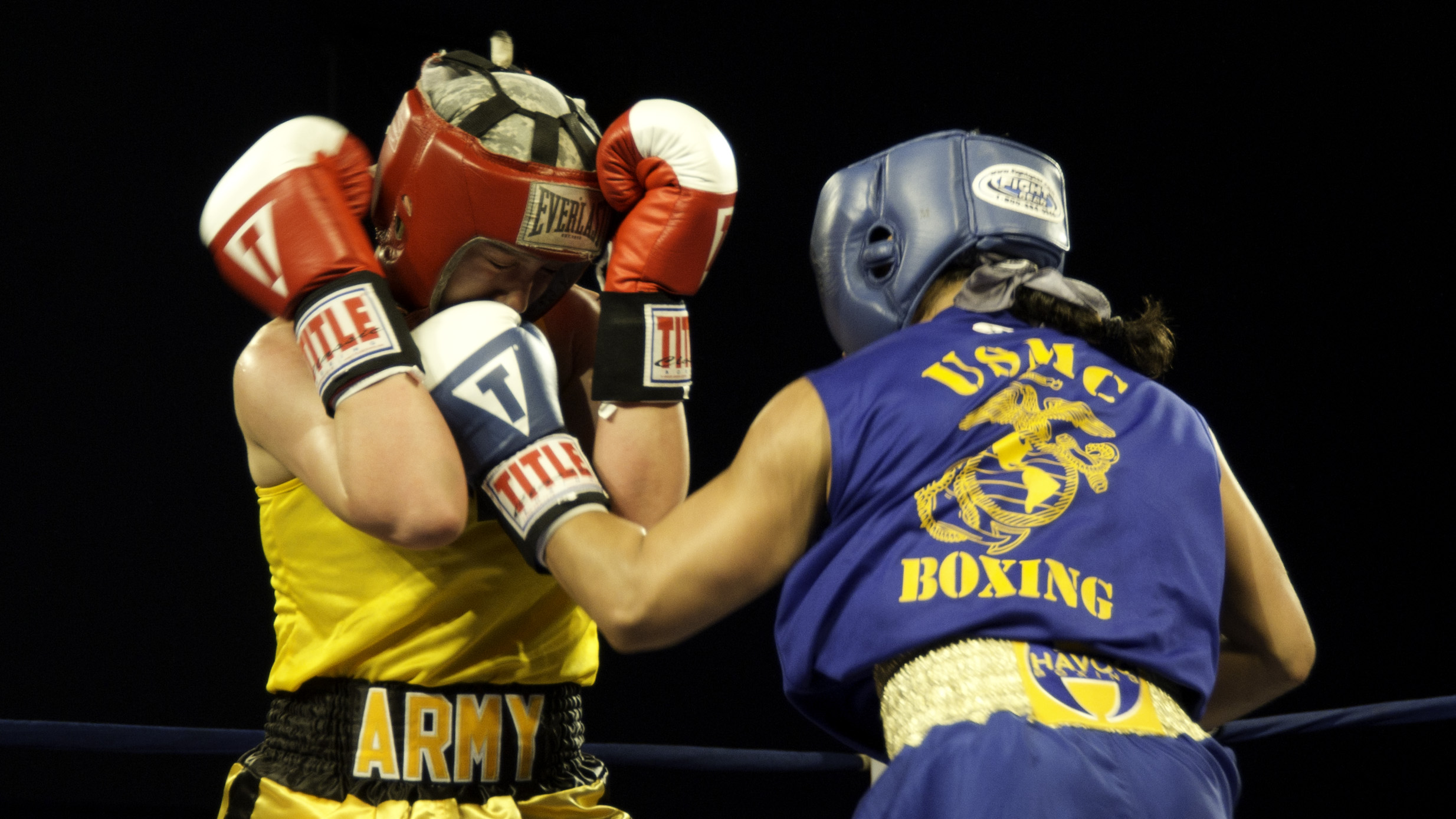
Boxer (right) using up jab to exposed face of opponent in a Conventional Guard

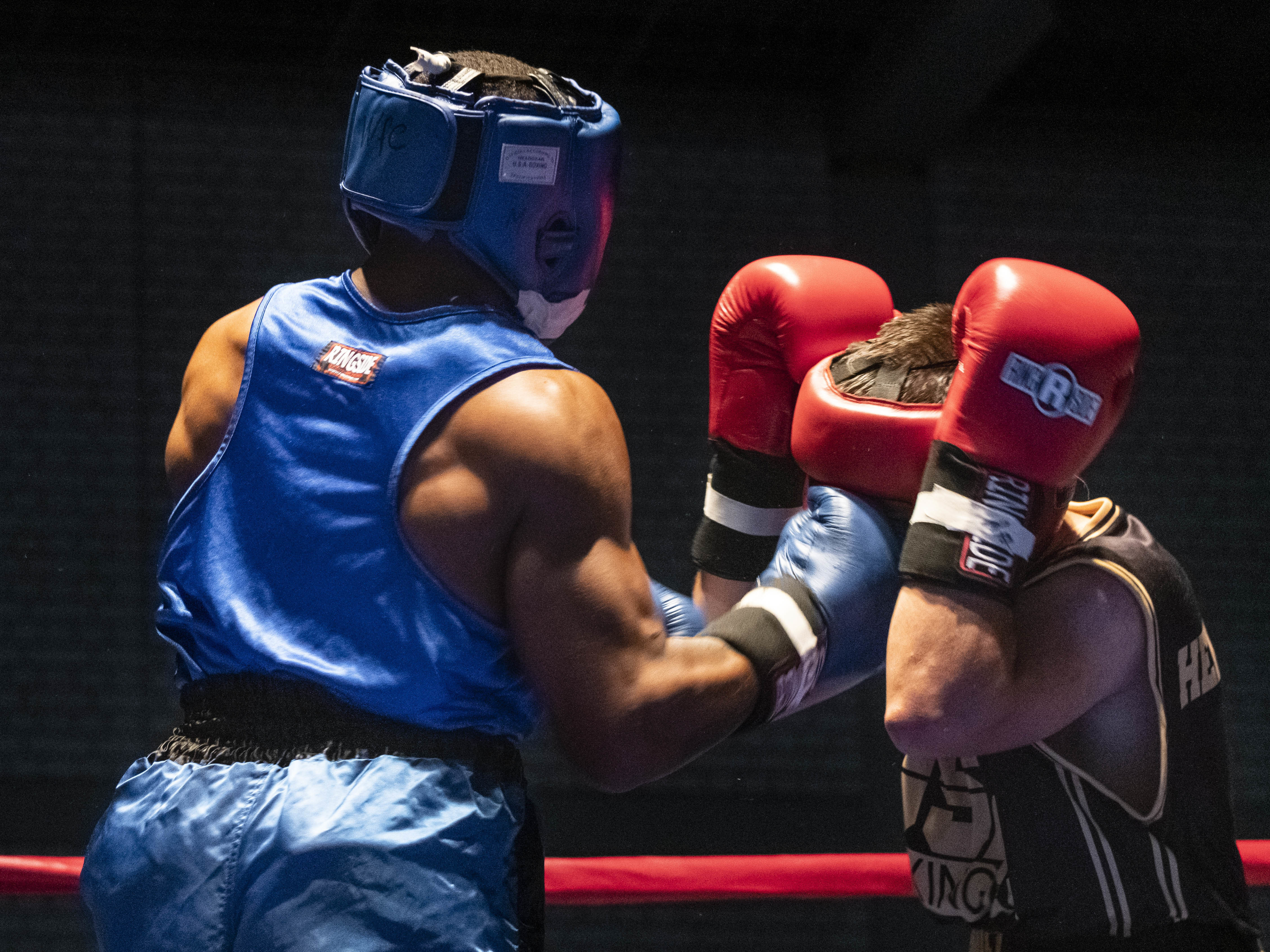
Boxer (left) using uppercut to exposed face of opponent in a Conventional Guard

Like the traditional guard, the conventional guard leaves a space between the hands exposing the centerline, leaving the face down to the midsection open for attacks, and lacks passive defense against straight punches and uppercuts to the face and midsection. The conventional guard requires active defense against these punches such as using parries. The active defense also requires the same high level of specificity as the traditional guard making this guard difficult to master.

The conventional guard also generally only provides one line of defense, compared to Crab Style guards which often use both the lead and rear hand to block the same punch for redundant safety. The conventional guard also relies heavily on blocking with the hands. As the hands are also needed to punch this often puts the conventional guard boxer in the position of blocking first and then counterpunching before an opponent can reset to punch again. The hand positioning also leaves boxers susceptible to hand traps and framing. It also makes punches easy to see by the opponent.

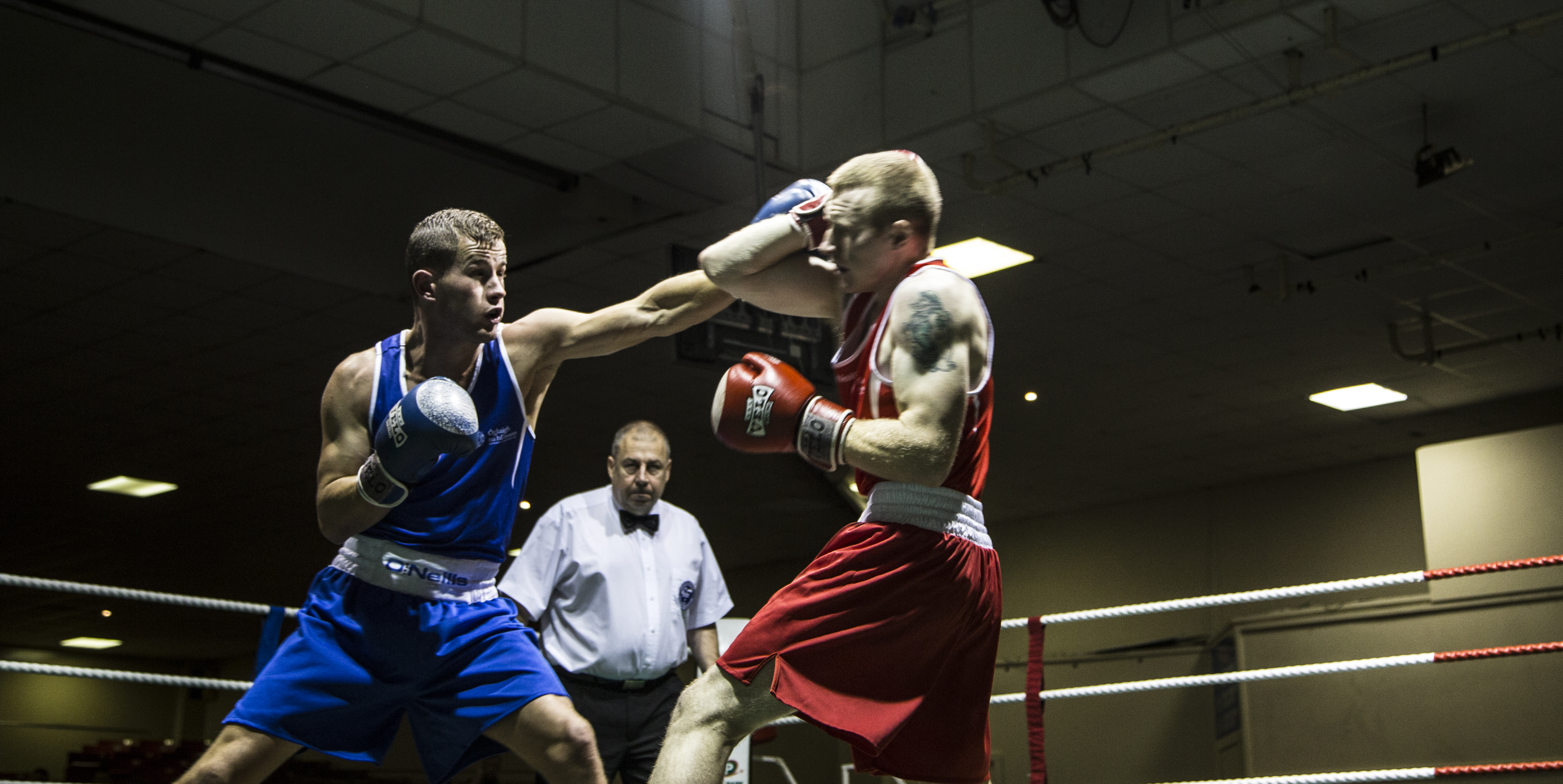
Boxer (right) using a helmet cover

The helmet cover, also known as a hammer cover, is a variation of the hook cover. It is a defensive technique where a fighter raises their forearm and hand to protect their head, it resembles a person using a hammer. This technique is often used when facing opponents who throw high-impact punches to defend against hooks and overhands. The helmet guard is a variation of the conventional guard except one or both elbows are in a helmet cover position where the elbows flare outwards towards the opponent. This provides additional head protection, but leaves the sides of the body open to attacks.

=== High Guard ===
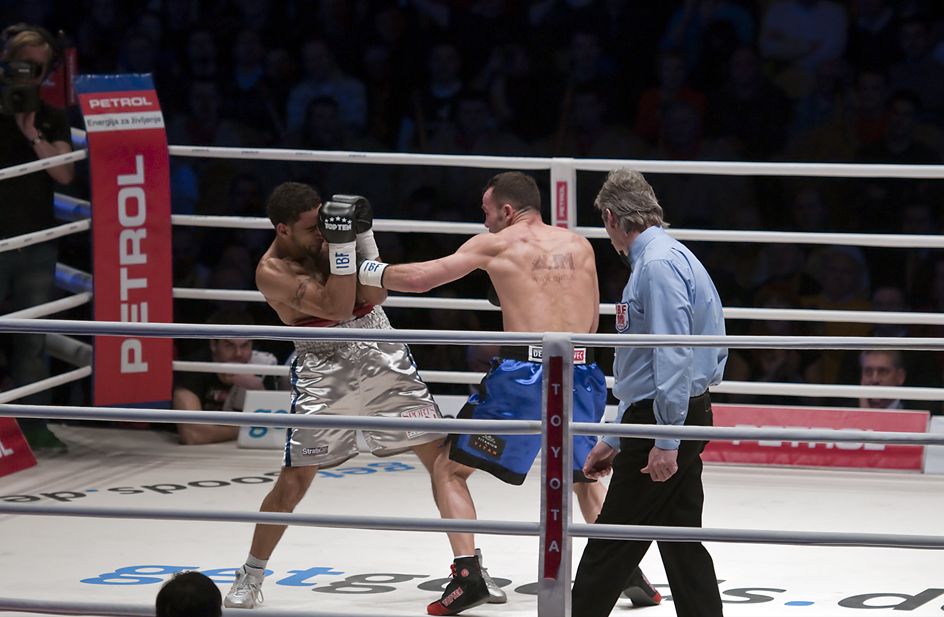
Boxer (left) using a high guard

The high guard consists of both arms bent at a 90 degree, or less, angle with the gloves in front of the face pressed against the forehead usually about eyebrow level and the hands positioned as if looking through a pair of binoculars or making a heart shape. The shoulders are raised to defend the jaw, while the elbows are pressed together to defend against uppercuts to the head. The advantages of the high guard are that the initial guard position is easy to learn, as it is just a matter of raising the arms. The bent position of the arms also allows boxers to punch with more power compared to the extended arms of the long guards.

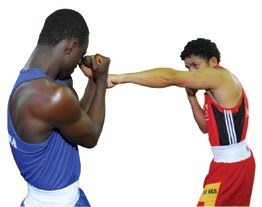
Passive defense against straight punch from a high guard

Unlike the traditional guard and the conventional guard, the high guard provides passive defense against straight punches and uppercuts to the head and upper body as well as limited defense against hooks using the back of the gloves to absorb hook punches to the temple, the raised shoulders to block the chin, and the elbows to block hook punches to the body. Unlike the traditional and conventional guard, the high guard does not leave the centerline for the head and upper body exposed.

With both hands and forearms positioned in front of the face this provides a fighter with slower reflexes the ability to passively cover rather than use parries and other active defensive tactics. As the guard still puts the hands partially in the hook cover position, it can passively defend against hooks to the temple and chin. The high guard's passive defense does not requires a high level of specificity like the traditional and conventional guard making this guard easier to master.

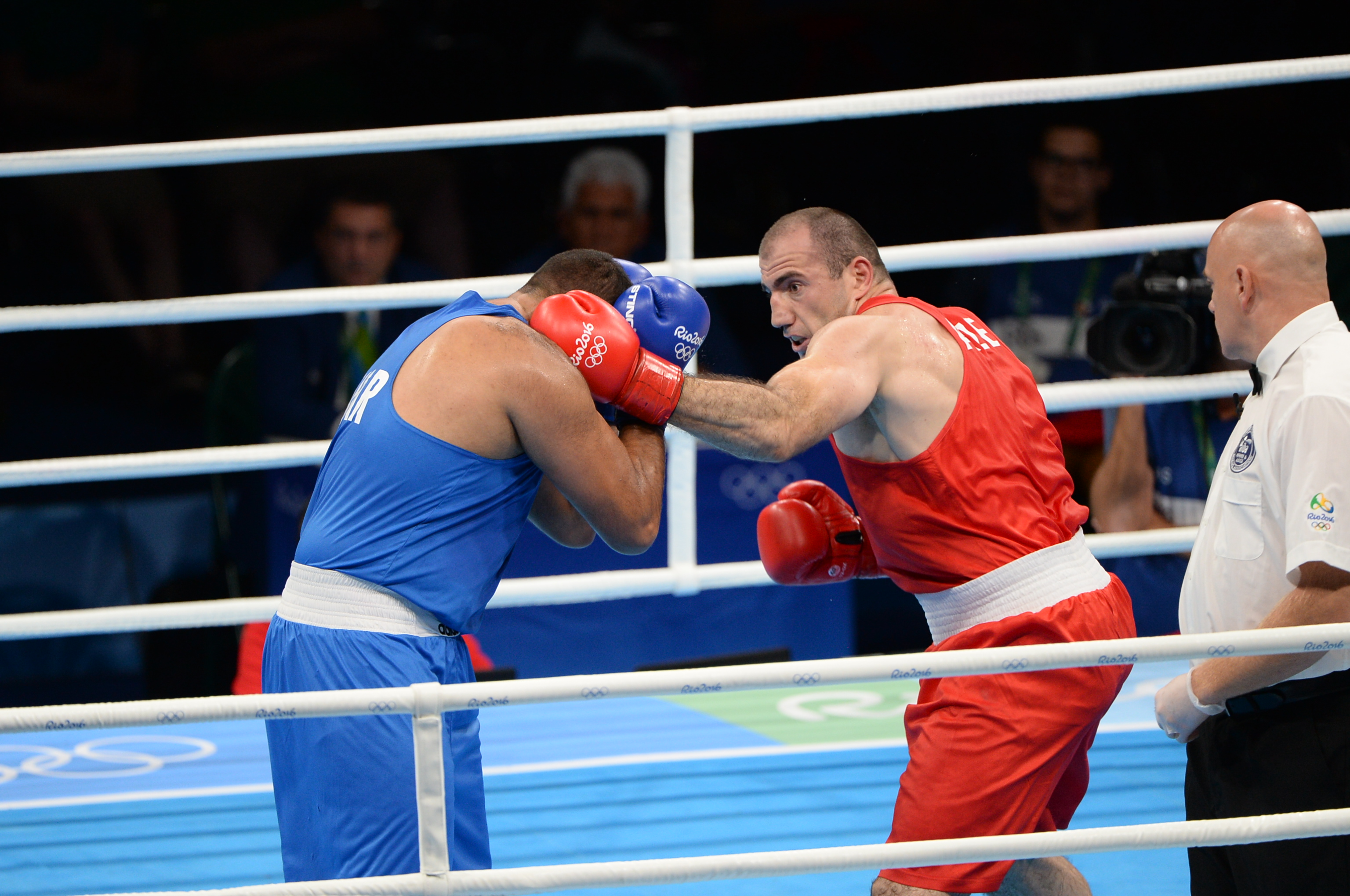
Boxer (right) attacking the exposed ear of opponent in a High Guard

The disadvantages are the High Guard requires the fighter to keep their arms and shoulders raised which tires their shoulders causing them to occasionally drop their guard to rest their shoulders which leaves them vulnerable to strikes. The high guard also relies heavily on covering, rather than blocking or evading, and because of this the boxer still takes some damage to the head even while guarding. While the high guard partially protects against hooks, the ears and jaw are still exposed and hooks to the ears or behind the ears may still land. The hands are also generally held at eye level, or higher, which limits the boxer's visibility compared to the traditional guard.

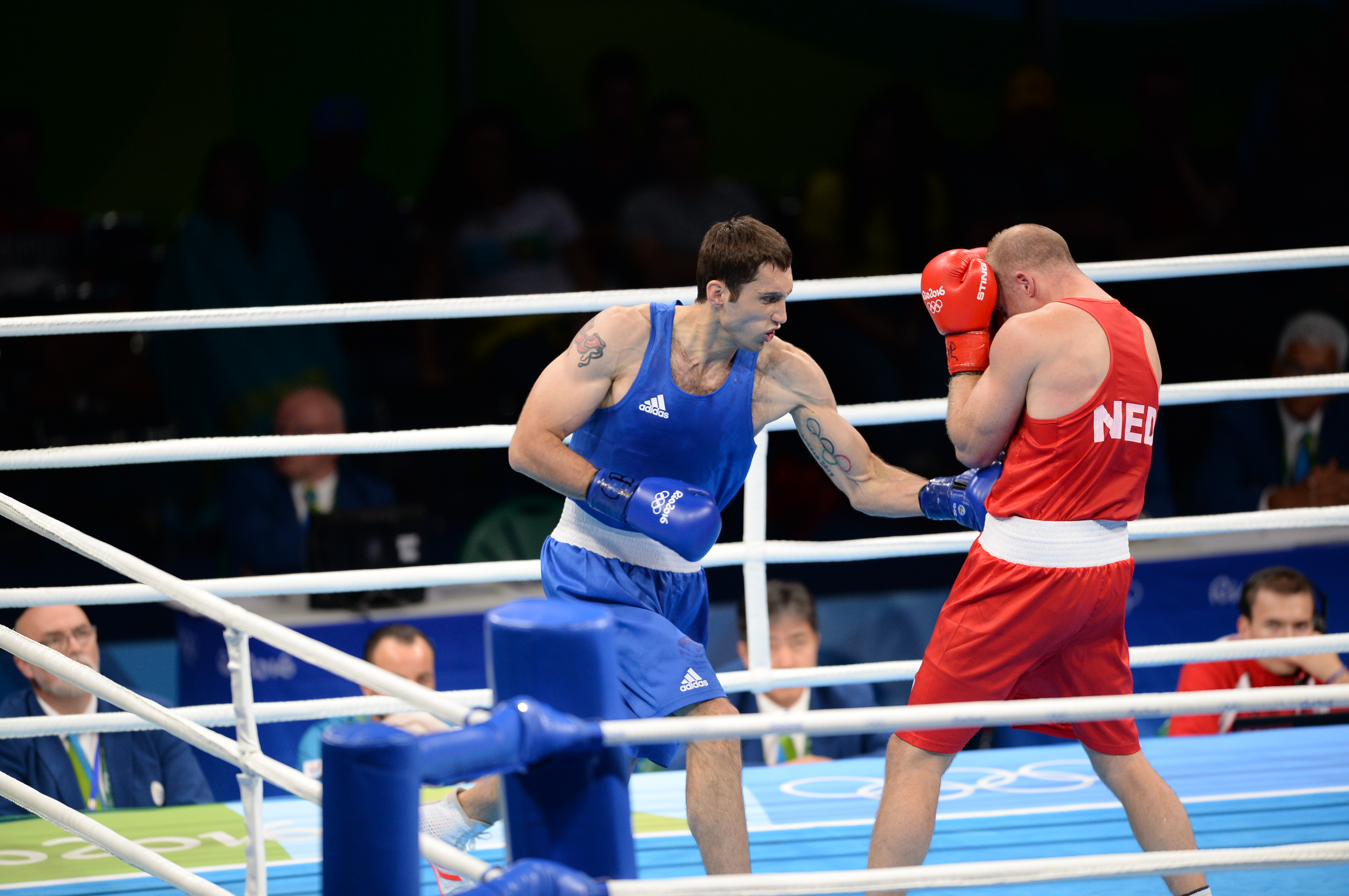
Boxer (left) attacking the exposed midsection of opponent in a High Guard

In the high guard, the centerline of the lower body does not have passive defense making punches to the midsection easier to land. With the lead arm closer to the body it does not create the distance that the traditional guard does, which can be used for defensive traffic, allowing opponents to close the distance easier.

The high guard also generally only provides one line of defense. Although both the lead and rear hand cover against the same punch together, they are both positioned next to each other at the same distance, as opposed to the lead hand being used as a primary defense and the rear hand used as a secondary defense in case the primary defense fails.

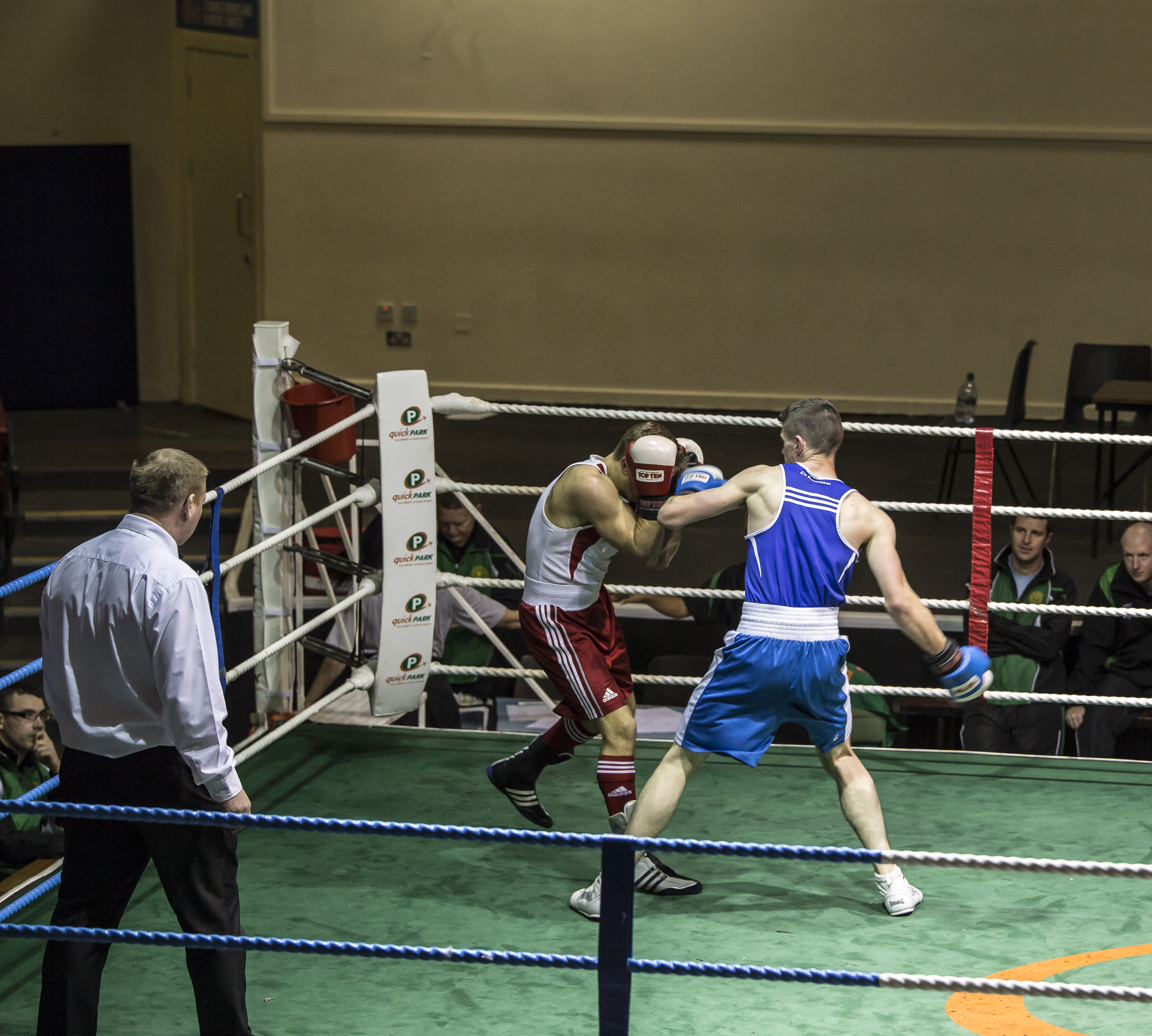
Boxer (right) using framing against boxer (left) using High Guard

The high hand positioning of the high guard also leaves boxers susceptible to hand traps, prying and framing. and also makes punches easy to see by an opponent. The high guard also relies heavily on covering with the hands and blocking punches directly with the forearms which can take damage over the course of the fight. As the hands are also needed to punch this often puts the high guard boxer in the position of covering first and then counterpunching before an opponent can reset to punch again.

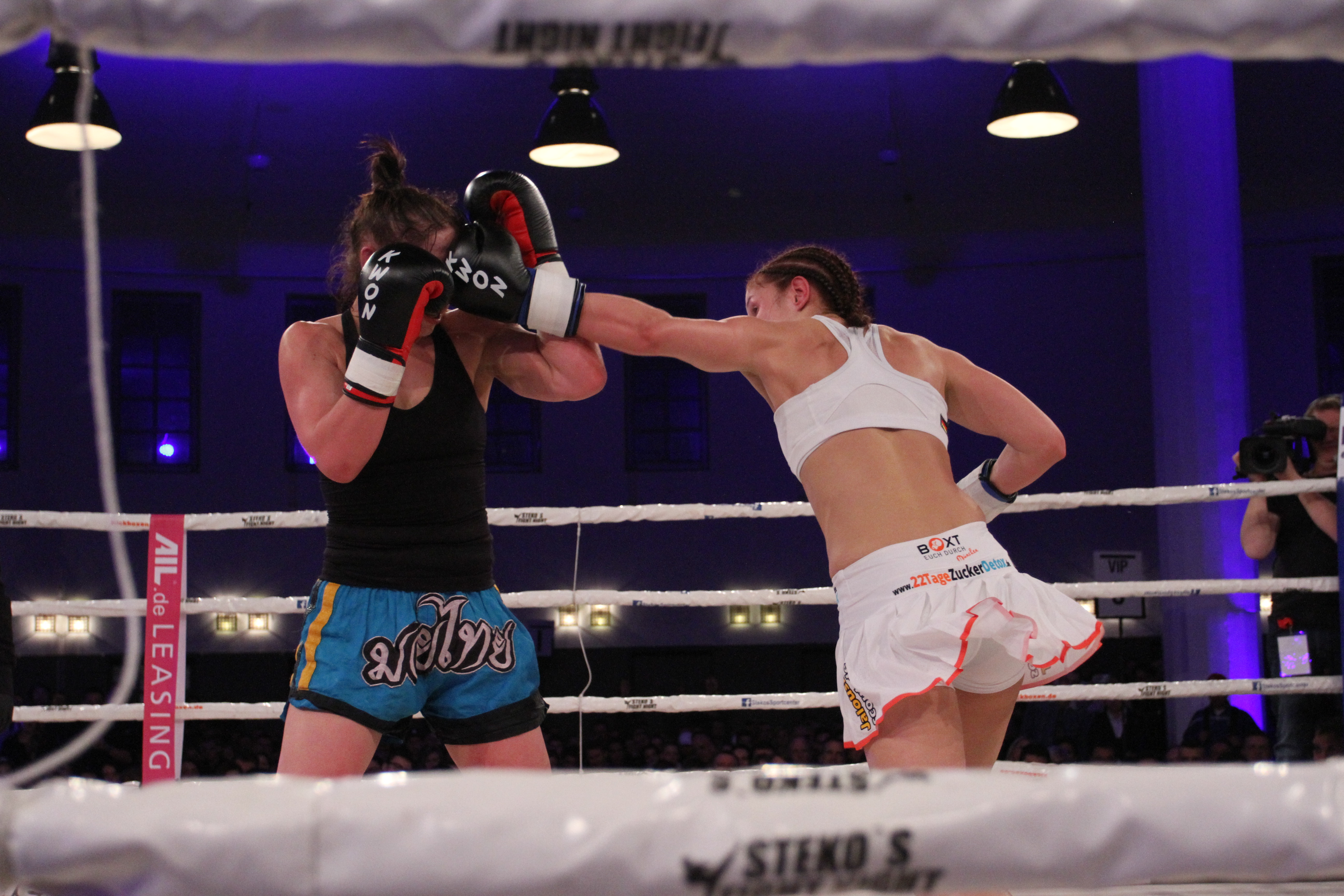
Boxer (right) using vertical punch splitting boxer's (left) high guard

The high guard can also be split allowing vertical punches, and punches such as a spear jab, to land. Opponents are also more likely to initiate strikes against a high guard because they know the opponent must use their arms to block and cannot easily attack if they are being punched.

While this is a disadvantage, a high guard fighter can use this to their advantage by baiting an opponent to strike them when putting up the high guard, then quickly using a pull and counter as used by boxers such as Floyd Mayweather Jr.

High Guard fighters include Marlon Starling and Winky Wright.

== Kickboxing ==
The classic guards have many of the same advantages and disadvantages as they do in boxing as well as additional advantages and disadvantages with regards to kicks, elbows, knees and clinching in various styles of Kickboxing.

=== Traditional Guard Kickboxing ===
Kickboxers benefit from the increased distance with the lead arm extended. This allows the fighter to easily move from punching to kicking range. The extended lead arm also gives the kickboxer more distance to redirect powerful roundhouse kicks. Quicker roundhouse, crescent and hook kicks, however, may be able to strike the side of the face in the gap between the head and the lead arm.

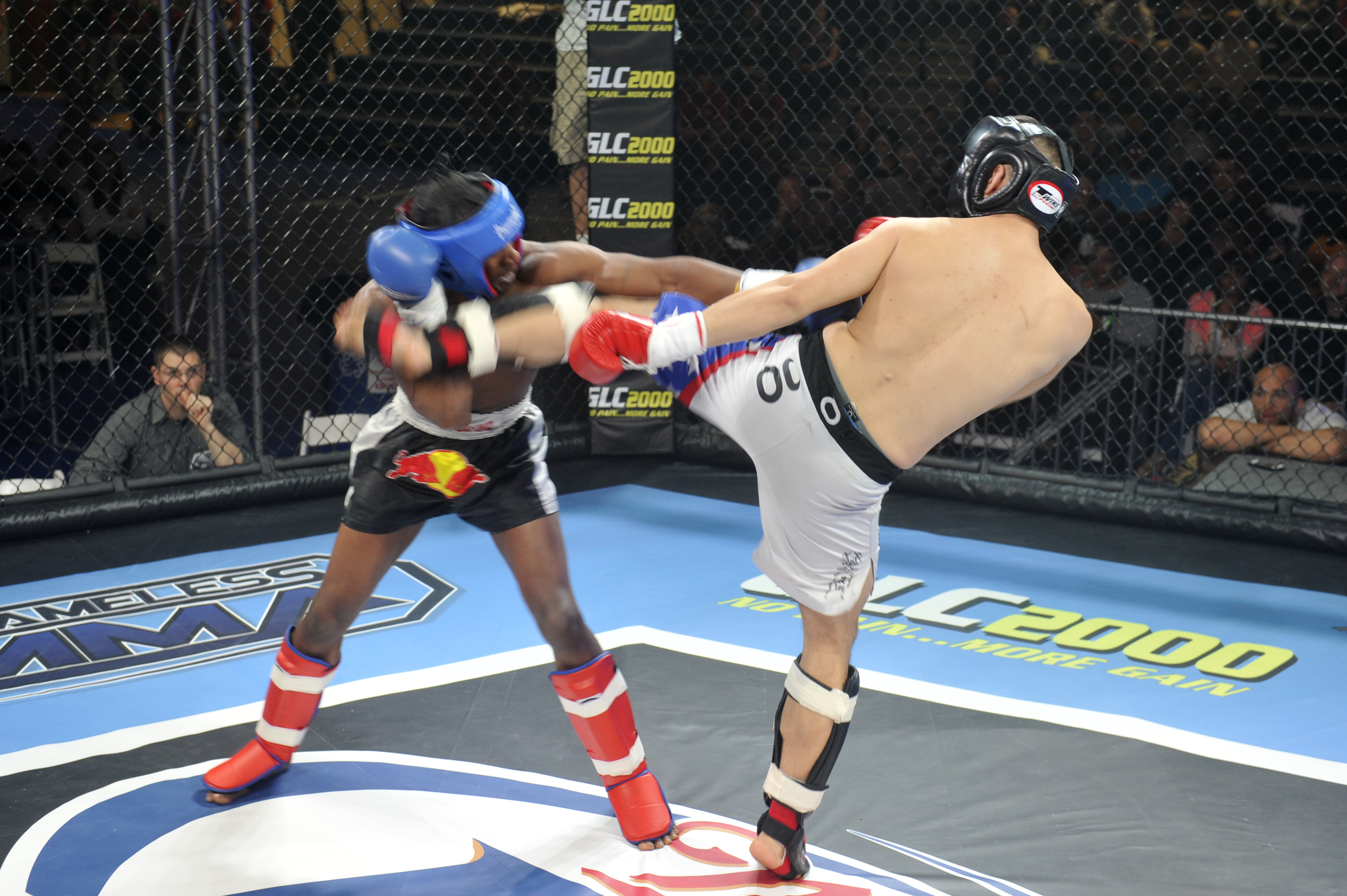
Kickboxer (left) using hook cover against roundhouse kick to the head

In styles of kickboxing where modern boxing gloves are worn the padding of the glove can help absorb the force of roundhouse kicks to the head. In styles of kickboxing where smaller gloves are worn, such as ONE Championship, or no gloves are worn, traditional guard fighters may be knocked out from the force of the roundhouse kick even while guarding against the attack due to the lack of padding to help absorb the impact. Even when wearing boxing gloves kickboxers often get an arm broken while using the traditional guard from the force of a roundhouse kick if it hits their arm instead of the padded glove.

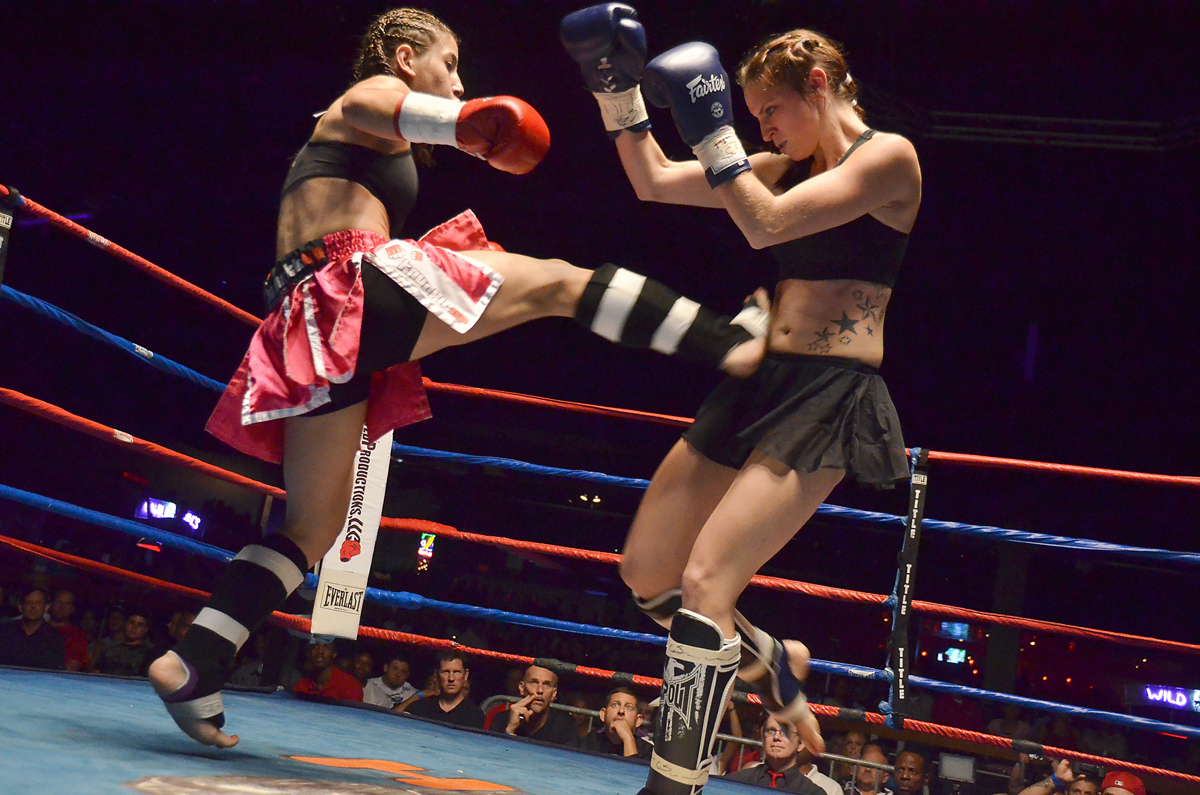
Kickboxer (left) attacking the exposed midsection of opponent in traditional guard

The traditional guard provides passive defense against round kicks to the sides of the body by elbow blocking. The midsection, however, is on centerline and unprotected exposed to front kicks, side kicks, back kicks and oblique kicks which require active defense. The face is also on centerline and exposed to many of those same kicks as well as axe kicks. In kickboxing styles such as Muay Thai elbows and knees can also be used to attack the open face between the guard.

While traditional guard boxers are susceptible to hand traps and frames, in some styles of kickboxing clinching is allowed and an opponent, especially one with open finger gloves or no gloves, could simply grab the traditional guard fighter's arms to prevent them from punching. The extended lead arm of the traditional guard fighter, however, allows them a greater ability to initiate clinches of their own.

=== Conventional Guard Kickboxing ===
Conventional guard and variations of such as the helmet guard, are also used in kickboxing. Conventional guard kickboxers cannot control distance or move as easily from punching to kicking range as traditional guard kickboxers. Their hand position also does not give them the increased distance to redirect powerful roundhouse kicks that the traditional guard does. Quicker less powerful roundhouse, crescent and hook kicks, however, may be blocked passively as there is no gap between their lead arm and head like the traditional guard.

Like with the traditional guard, in styles of kickboxing where modern boxing gloves are worn the padding of the glove can help absorb the force of roundhouse kicks to the head. In styles of kickboxing where smaller gloves or no gloves are worn, fighters may be knocked out from the force of the roundhouse kick even while guarding against the attack due to the lack of padding to help absorb the impact. Even when wearing boxing gloves kickboxers often get their arms broken while using the conventional guard from the force of a roundhouse kick if it hits their arms instead of the padded glove.

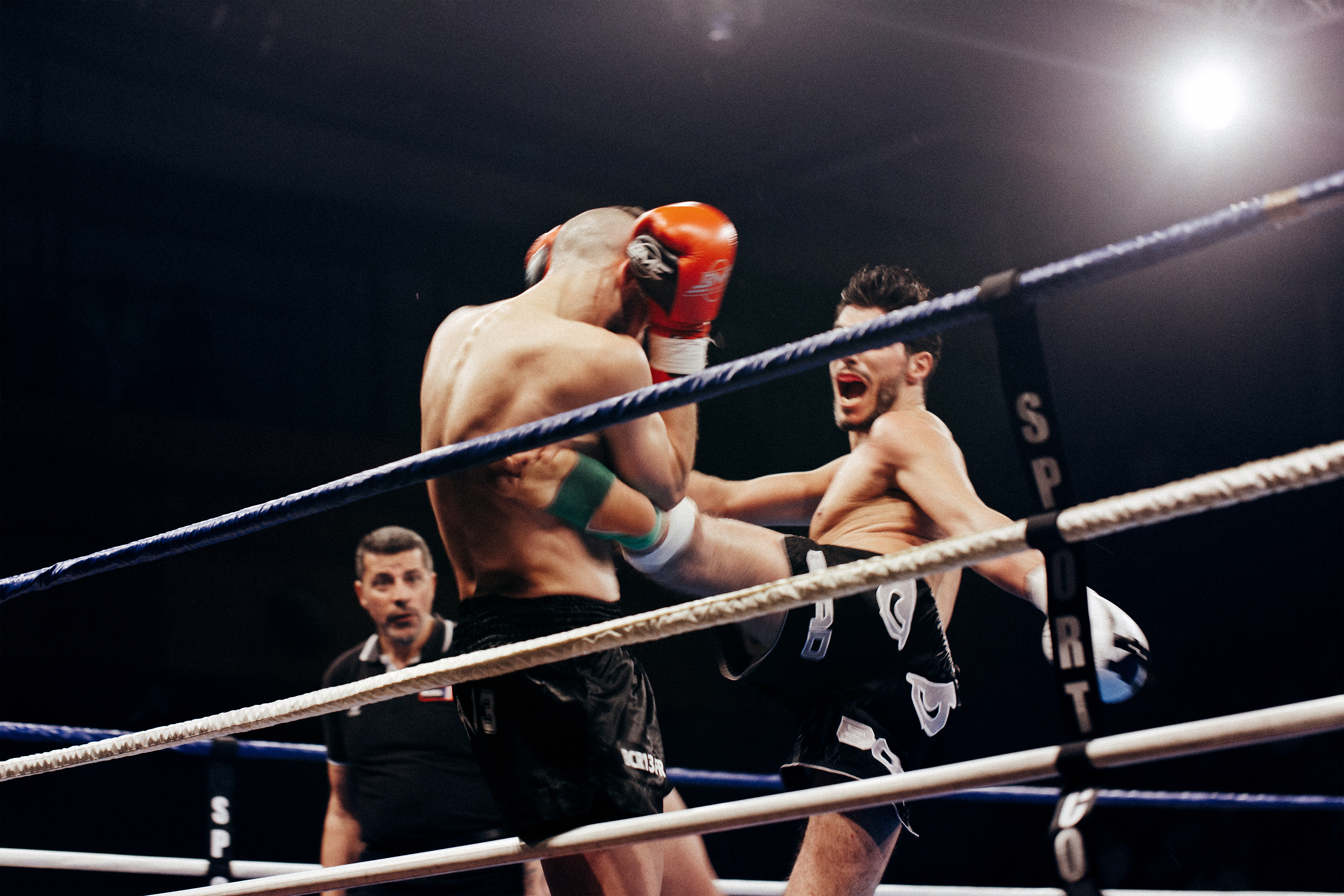
Kickboxer (right) landing a kick to the liver against opponent using Conventional Guard

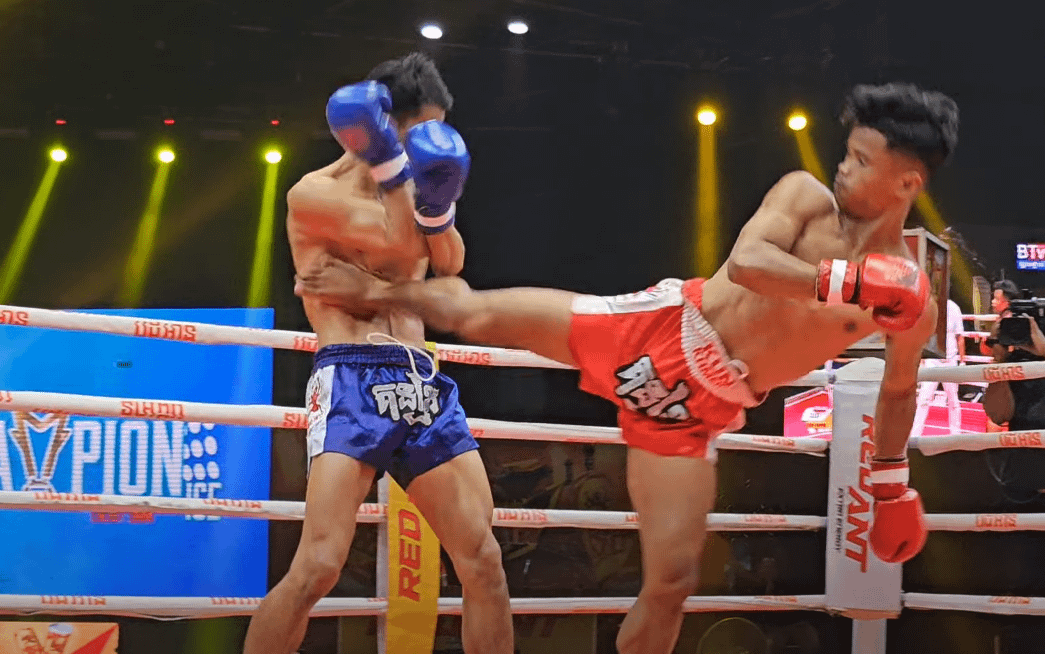
Kickboxer (right) landing back kick to the liver of opponent in Conventional Guard

If the conventional guard is held at chin level it also provides defense against round kicks to the sides of the body by elbow blocking. If the guard is held at eye level or higher, however, it exposes the sides of the body to punches and kicks such as liver shots. The midsection and face are also exposed in the conventional guard, as the centerline is unprotected making it vulnerable to punches and kicks. In kickboxing styles where elbows and knees are permitted they can also be used to attack the open face and top of the head between the guard. There is, however, passive defense against elbows and knees to the sides of head.

In styles of kickboxing where clinching is allowed an opponent could simply grab the conventional guard user's arms to prevent them from punching. The hands fixed to the sides of the head also make initiating clinches more difficult.

The helmet guard, a variation of the conventional guard, is also used in kickboxing. The helmet guard is like the conventional guard except the elbows flare outwards towards the opponent. This provides additional head protection, but leaves the sides of the body open to attacks.

=== High Guard Kickboxing ===
Also referred to as the Dutch guard in Kickboxing due to it commonly being used by Dutch fighters, the high guard provides protection against sidekicks and upward front kicks to the head and upper body, but little protection against these kicks to the midsection. The high guard provides some protection against teeps, back kicks and knees, however, these kicks and knees can sometimes get between the guard, or split the high guard, the guard is sometimes extended when faced with these kicks and knees in case the guard is split.

The high guard also provides defense against roundhouse kicks to the sides of the body by elbow blocking and roundhouse kicks to the head by the padded gloves. However, in styles of kickboxing where smaller gloves or no gloves are worn, fighters may be knocked out from the force of the roundhouse kick even while guarding against the attack due to the lack of padding to help absorb the impact. Even when wearing boxing gloves kickboxers can still get their arm broken while using the high guard from the force of a roundhouse kick if it hits their arm instead of the padded glove. Even when wearing boxing gloves the high guard user is susceptible to roundhouse kicks delivered with the ball of the foot and hook kicks aimed at the ears.

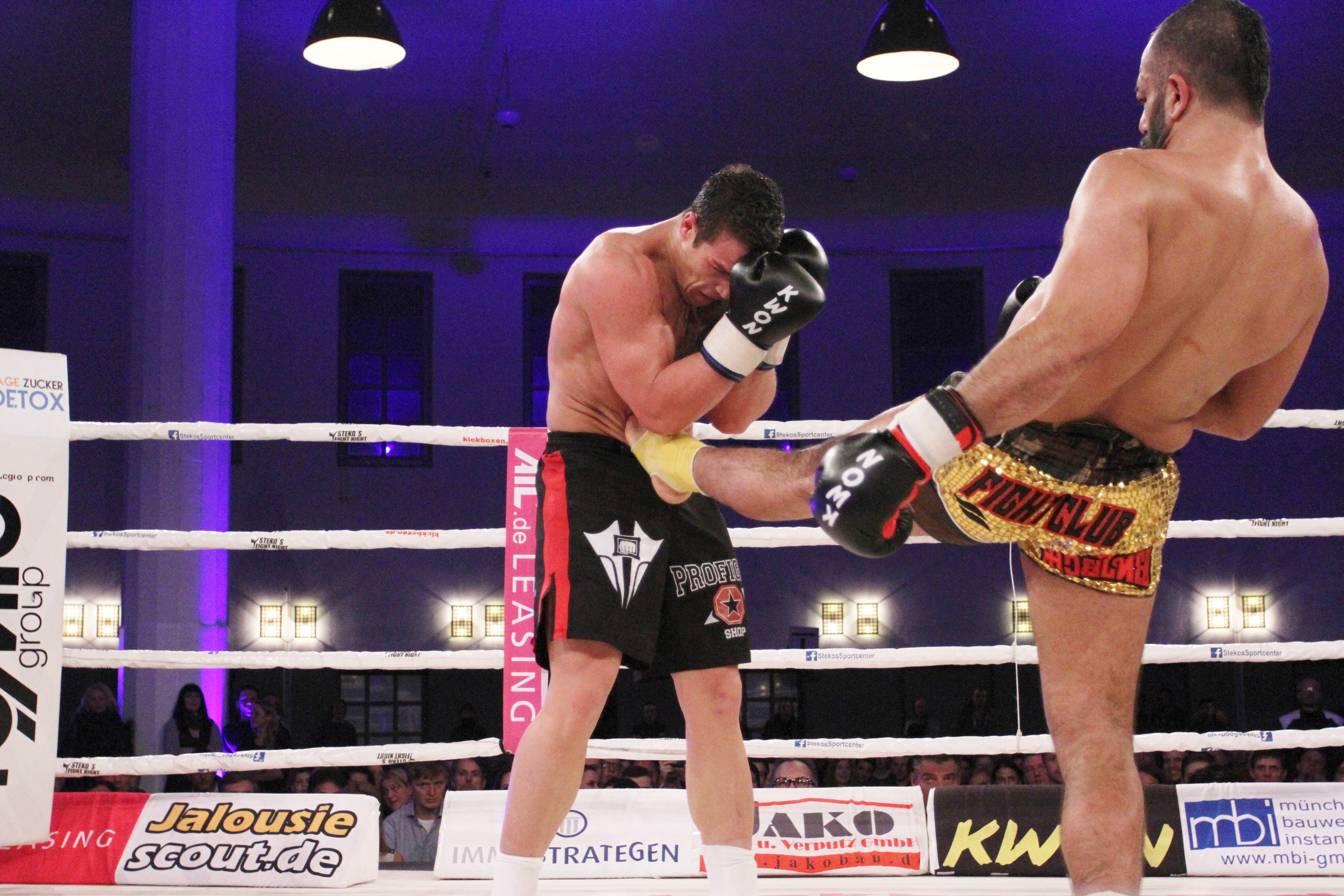
Kickboxer (right) attacking the exposed midsection of opponent in a High Guard

The midsection is on centerline and unprotected exposing it to kicks that require active defense. In kickboxing styles where elbows and knees are permitted the high guard can provide passive defense for the face, but not the top of the head. In styles of kickboxing where open finger gloves or no gloves are used high guard users can extended their fingers upwards above their forehead to provide some passive protection against cuts from elbows. In styles of kickboxing where clinching is allowed however, an opponent could simply grab the High Guard user's arms to prevent them from punching. The hands fixed to the head also make initiating clinches more difficult.
