= Kreshnik Qato =

Albanian boxer

Personal information
- Nickname: The Eagle
- Nationality: Albanian
- Born: 13 August 1978 (age 48) Durrës, Albania
- Height: 5 ft 9 1/2 in (177 cm)
- Weight: Middleweight; Super-middleweight

Boxing career
- Stance: Orthodox

Boxing record
- Total fights: 39
- Wins: 30
- Win by KO: 5
- Losses: 9

Kreshnik Nick Qato (born 13 August 1978) is an Albanian former professional boxer who competed from 2001 to 2014. He held multiple regional titles at super-middleweight, including the WBA Inter-Continental title in 2004 and the European External title in 2007, and also held minor world titles at middleweight; the WBFo title in 2008 and the WBF title from 2009 to 2010.

== Professional boxing record ==
30 Wins (5 knockouts, 25 decisions), 9 Losses (3 knockouts, 6 decisions), 0 Draws
Res.	Record	Opponent	Type	Rd., Time	Date	Location	Notes
Loss	30-9	(England) Jason Ball	TKO	10	2014-04-27	York Hall, Bethnal Green, London, England	
Win	30-8	(Czech Republic) Atilla Kiss	UD	6	2014-02-23	York Hall, Bethnal Green, London, England	
Win	29-8	(England) Max Maxwell	UD	6	2013-06-01	York Hall, Bethnal Green, London, England	
Win	28-8	(England) Matt Hainy	SD	10	2012-06-02	ExCel Arena, London Docklands, England	Won vacant BBBofC English middleweight title
Win	27-8	(Latvia) Ruslans Pojonisevs	PTS	4	2012-03-23	The Troxy, Limehouse, London, England	
Win	26-8	(England) Terry Carruthers	PTS	6	2011-10-07	York Hall, Bethnal Green, London, England	
Loss	25-8	(England) Gary Boulden	PTS	10	2011-05-15	York Hall, Bethnal Green, London, England	For BBBofC Southern Area Middleweight Title
Win	25-7	(Wales) Steffan Hughes	RTD	2 (6)	2011-02-20	York Hall, Bethnal Green, London, England	
Loss	24-7	(Tanzania) Karama Nyilawila	UD	12	2010-12-03	Arena Sparta, Prague, Czech Republic	Lost WBFo Middleweight Title
Win	24-6	(England) Matt Scriven	PTS	6	2010-06-04	York Hall, Bethnal Green, London, England	
Win	23-6	(Argentina) Esteban Waldemar Ponce	UD	12	2010-05-02	Pallati i Sporti "Asllan Rusi", Tirana, Albania	Retained WBF Middleweight Title
Win	22-6	(Latvia) Alex Spitko	PTS	6	2010-03-21	York Hall, Bethnal Green, London, England	
Win	21-6	(Italy) Fabio Liggieri	UD	12	2009-10-24	Anhalt Arena, Dessau, Sachsen-Anhalt, Germany	Won vacant WBF Middleweight Title
Win	20-6	(Hungary) Zoltan Surman	TKO	3 (6)	2009-07-11	Kensington Town Hall, Kensington, London, England	
Win	19-6	(Latvia) Jurijs Boreiko	PTS	6	2009-03-27	Kensington Town Hall, Kensington, London, England	
Win	18-6	(United States) David Estrada	TKO	6 (12)	2008-12-20	Howard U. Burr Arena, Washington, D.C., United States	Retained WBFo Middleweight Title
Win	17-6	(Portugal) Vitor Sa	UD	12	2008-04-04	Tirana, Albania	Won vacant WBFo Middleweight Title
Win	16-6	(England) Ernie Smith	PTS	6	2007-11-14	York Hall, Bethnal Green, London, England	
Win	15-6	(Russia) Alexander Zaitsev	UD	12	2007-03-03	Tirana, Albania	Won vacant EBU-EU Super Middleweight Title
Win	14-6	(England) Simeon Cover	PTS	10	2006-12-08	Goresbrook Leisure Centre, Dagenham, Essex, England	Won vacant BBBofC Southern Area Super Middleweight Title
Win	13-6	(England) Simeon Cover	PTS	6	2006-09-15	Alexandra Palace, Wood Green, London, England	
Win	12-6	(France) Sylvain Touzet	PTS	6	2006-07-15	Ramazan Njala Sports Palace, Durrës, Albania	
Win	11-6	(England) Simone Lucas	PTS	4	2006-05-26	York Hall, Bethnal Green, London, England	
Win	10-6	(France) Laurent Goury	PTS	6	2006-04-02	York Hall, Bethnal Green, London, England	
Win	9-6	(Belarus) Daniil Prakaptsou	PTS	8	2005-10-09	Hammersmith Palace, Hammersmith, London, England	
Win	8-6	(Russia) Dmitry Donetsky	TKO	6 (6)	2005-06-12	Equinox Nightclub, Leicester Square, London, England	
Win	7-6	(Ukraine) Rizvan Magomedov	UD	12	2005-03-05	Durrës, Albania	Won IBC International Super Middleweight Title
Win	6-6	(Russia) Vladimir Zavgorodniy	UD	10	2004-10-16	Yalta Inturist Hotel, Yalta, Ukraine	Won vacant WBA Inter-Continental Super Middleweight Title
Loss	5-6	(Wales) Gary Lockett	TKO	2 (8)	2004-02-21	National Ice Rink, Cardiff, Wales	
Loss	5-5	(England) Steven Bendall	PTS	8	2003-11-14	York Hall, Bethnal Green, London, England	
Win	5-4	(England) Joel Ani	PTS	6	2003-09-26	Britannia International Hotel, Canary Wharf, London, England	
Loss	4-4	(England) Scott Dann	TKO	2 (8)	2003-07-26	The Pavilions, Plymouth, Devon, England	
Win	4-3	(England) Danny Thornton	PTS	6	2003-05-13	Leeds United F.C. Banqueting Suite, Leeds, Yorkshire, England	
Win	3-3	(England) Mark Thornton	TKO	3 (4)	2003-04-13	Caesars Nightclub, Streatham, London, England	
Win	2-3	(England) Jason Collins	PTS	4	2003-03-20	Porchester Hall, Queensway, London, England	
Loss	1-3	(England) Paul Jones	PTS	6	2002-05-10	Britannia Hotel, Millwall, London, England	
Win	1-2	(England) Ty Browne	PTS	4	2002-04-08	Southampton Guildhall, Hampshire, England	
Loss	0-2	(Scotland) Lawrence Murphy	PTS	6	2001-12-16	Thistle Hotel, Glasgow, Scotland	
Loss	0-1	(Georgia (country)) Eric Teymour	PTS	6	2001-09-28	Britannia International Hotel, Canary Wharf, London, England	
