= Verno Phillips =

Belizean boxer

Personal information
- Born: Verno Jeremias Phillips; November 29, 1969 (age 56) Belize City, Belize
- Height: 5 ft 7 in (170 cm)
- Weight: Light middleweight; Middleweight

Boxing career
- Reach: 69 in (175 cm)
- Stance: Orthodox

Boxing record
- Total fights: 55
- Wins: 42
- Win by KO: 21
- Losses: 11
- Draws: 1
- No contests: 1

Verno Jeremias Phillips (born November 29, 1969) is a Belizean former professional boxer who competed from 1988 to 2008. He is a three-time junior middleweight world champion, having held the WBO title from 1993 to 1995, and the IBF title twice in 2004 and 2008.

== Professional career ==
Phillips turned professional in 1988 and captured the Vacant WBO light middleweight title in 1993 with a win over Lupe Aquino. He defended the title four times before losing a decision to Paul Jones of England. In 2004 Phillips captured the vacant IBF light middleweight title by beating Carlos Bojorquez via a TKO, but lost the belt in his next fight to Kassim Ouma. He lost his next bout to Ike Quartey, but in 2006 rallied with wins over Juan Carlos Candelo and Teddy Reid, televised by ESPN. On March 27, 2008, Phillips beat Cory Spinks by disputed split decision to regain the IBF light middleweight title.

Philips signed to fight the young Paul Williams on November 29, 2008, on HBO for the vacant WBO interim light middleweight title, vacating his IBF title in the process. Phillips ended up losing the bout the after his cornerman, Trevor Wittman, stopped the fight at the end of the eighth round, resulting in only the second loss via TKO in his career.

== Professional boxing record ==
55 fights	42 wins	11 losses
By knockout	21	2
By decision	20	9
By disqualification	1	0
Draws	1	
No contests	1	

No.	Result	Record	Opponent	Type	Round, time	Date	Location	Notes
55	Loss	42–11–1 (1)	Paul Williams	TKO	8 (12), 3:00	Nov 29, 2008	Citizens Business Bank Arena, Ontario, California, U.S.	For vacant WBO interim light middleweight title
54	Win	42–10–1 (1)	Cory Spinks	SD	12	Mar 27, 2008	Scottrade Center, St. Louis, Missouri, U.S.	Won IBF light middleweight title
53	Win	41–10–1 (1)	Eduardo Sanchez	UD	10	Feb 16, 2007	Wynn Las Vegas, Paradise, Nevada, U.S.	
52	Win	40–10–1 (1)	Teddy Reid	TKO	12 (12), 2:04	Aug 9, 2006	Foxwoods Resort Casino, Ledyard, Connecticut, U.S.	Won vacant TAB middleweight title
51	Win	39–10–1 (1)	Juan Carlos Candelo	UD	10	Apr 5, 2006	New Orleans Arena, New Orleans, Louisiana, U.S.	
50	Loss	38–10–1 (1)	Ike Quartey	UD	10	Jun 18, 2005	FedExForum, Memphis, Tennessee, U.S.	
49	Loss	38–9–1 (1)	Kassim Ouma	UD	12	Oct 2, 2004	Caesars Palace, Paradise, Nevada, U.S.	Lost IBF light middleweight title
48	Win	38–8–1 (1)	Carlos Bojorquez	RTD	6 (12), 3:00	Jun 5, 2004	Leggett & Platt Athletic Center, Joplin, Missouri, U.S.	Won vacant IBF light middleweight title
47	Win	37–8–1 (1)	Julio Garcia	TKO	1 (12), 2:59	Mar 5, 2004	Pala Casino, Pala, California, U.S.	
46	Win	36–8–1 (1)	Michael Lerma	UD	10	Sep 5, 2003	Stardust Resort and Casino, Winchester, Nevada, U.S.	
45	Win	35–8–1 (1)	Bronco McKart	UD	10	Apr 25, 2003	Thunderbird Wild West Casino, Norman, Oklahoma, U.S.	
44	Win	34–8–1 (1)	Jose Flores	UD	10	Dec 6, 2002	Gund Arena, Cleveland, Ohio, U.S.	
43	Win	33–8–1 (1)	Tony Badea	TKO	4 (10), 3:00	Jul 19, 2002	Yakama Legends Casino, Toppenish, Washington, U.S.	
42	Win	32–8–1 (1)	Christian Lloyd Joseph	TKO	5 (12)	Mar 29, 2002	Denver Coliseum, Denver, Colorado, U.S.	Won vacant NBA light middleweight title
41	Loss	31–8–1 (1)	Kassim Ouma	UD	10	Sep 7, 2001	Magic Casino, Hankinson, North Dakota, U.S.	
40	Win	31–7–1 (1)	Vincent Moses	KO	5 (8)	Jun 30, 2000	Denver Coliseum, Denver, Colorado, U.S.	
39	Win	30–7–1 (1)	Julian Jackson	KO	9 (12), 2:01	Jan 23, 1998	Grand Casino, Tunica, Mississippi, U.S.	Retained WBU light middleweight title
38	Win	29–7–1 (1)	Godfrey Nyakana	TKO	11 (12), 2:11	Aug 29, 1997	City Center, Saratoga Springs, New York, U.S.	Retained WBU light middleweight title
37	Win	28–7–1 (1)	Gianfranco Rosi	MD	12	May 21, 1997	Moat House Hotel, Liverpool, England	Won vacant WBU light middleweight title
36	Win	27–7–1 (1)	Darryl Ruffin	UD	8	Mar 14, 1997	Pepsi Arena, Albany, New York, U.S.	
35	Loss	26–7–1 (1)	Silvio Branco	UD	12	Feb 13, 1997	Palazzetto dello Sport, Civitavecchia, Italy	For WBU middleweight title
34	Win	26–6–1 (1)	Juan Italo Meza	UD	10	Oct 4, 1996	Salta, Argentina	
33	Loss	25–6–1 (1)	Peter Venancio	UD	10	Jun 25, 1996	Community War Memorial, Rochester, New York, U.S.	
32	Loss	25–5–1 (1)	Paul Jones	MD	12	Nov 22, 1995	Hillsborough Leisure Centre, Sheffield, England	Lost WBO light middleweight title
31	NC	25–4–1 (1)	Gianfranco Rosi	UD	12	May 17, 1995	PalaEvangelisti, Perugia, Italy	WBO light middleweight title at stake; Originally a UD win for Rosi, later ruled an NC after he failed a drug test
30	Win	25–4–1	Santos Cardona	SD	12	Feb 3, 1995	Fernwood Resort, Bushkill, Pennsylvania, U.S.	Retained WBO light middleweight title
29	Win	24–4–1	Santos Cardona	UD	12	Nov 9, 1994	Lakefront Arena, New Orleans, Louisiana, U.S.	Retained WBO light middleweight title
28	Win	23–4–1	Jaime Llanes	TKO	7 (12), 2:46	Jul 25, 1994	Great Western Forum, Inglewood, California, U.S.	Retained WBO light middleweight title
27	Win	22–4–1	Lupe Aquino	TKO	7 (12), 0:57	Oct 30, 1993	America West Arena, Phoenix, Arizona, U.S.	Won vacant WBO light middleweight title
26	Win	21–4–1	Rafael Williams	TKO	5 (10), 0:20	May 28, 1993	New York City, New York, U.S.	Won New York light middleweight title
25	Win	20–4–1	Michael Ward	UD	10	Dec 23, 1992	Westchester County Center, White Plains, New York, U.S.	
24	Win	19–4–1	Ricardo Raul Nunez	KO	6 (10)	May 22, 1992	Salta, Argentina	
23	Win	18–4–1	Jose Luis Saldivia	KO	2 (10)	Apr 24, 1992	Salta, Argentina	
22	Win	17–4–1	Mario Alberto Gaston Chavez	TKO	6 (10)	Jan 24, 1992	Vedia, Argentina	
21	Win	16–4–1	Victor Hugo Marino	KO	7 (10)	Dec 7, 1991	Estadio FAB, Buenos Aires, Argentina	
20	Win	15–4–1	Francisco Bernabe Bobadilla	KO	2 (10)	Aug 16, 1991	Salta, Argentina	
19	Win	14–4–1	Daniel Omar Dominguez	PTS	10	Jul 21, 1991	Buenos Aires, Argentina	
18	Win	13–4–1	Julio César Vásquez	DQ	6 (10)	Jun 14, 1991	Mar del Plata, Argentina	
17	Draw	12–4–1	Ramon Anibal Jara	PTS	10	May 24, 1991	Salta, Argentina	
16	Win	12–4	Marcelo Domingo Di Croce	TKO	8 (10)	Nov 23, 1990	National Technological University Stadium, Santa Fe, Argentina	
15	Win	11–4	Hector Hugo Vilte	KO	4 (10)	Nov 16, 1990	Salta, Argentina	
14	Win	10–4	Floyd Peavy	TKO	5 (10), 1:55	Sep 6, 1990	Frear Park, Troy, New York, U.S.	
13	Win	9–4	Simon Rengifo	UD	8	Jun 28, 1990	Albany, New York, U.S.	
12	Loss	8–4	Kenny Gould	UD	6	Apr 29, 1990	Broadway by the Bay Theater, Atlantic City, New Jersey, U.S.	
11	Win	8–3	Curtis Summit	UD	10	Feb 12, 1990	Westchester County Center, White Plains, New York, U.S.	
10	Loss	7–3	Larry Barnes	UD	8	Jan 3, 1990	Westchester County Center, White Plains, New York, U.S.	
9	Win	7–2	Clarence White	UD	6	Aug 8, 1989	Bally's Park Place, Atlantic City, New Jersey, U.S.	
8	Win	6–2	Jose Nieves	TKO	3	Jun 24, 1989	Atlantic City, New Jersey, U.S.	
7	Win	5–2	Anthony Rorie	PTS	4	Mar 17, 1989	Sheraton Hotel, Hartford, Connecticut, U.S.	
6	Loss	4–2	Carl Sullivan	UD	8	Sep 29, 1988	Caesars Boardwalk Regency, Atlantic City, New Jersey, U.S.	
5	Loss	4–1	Carl Sullivan	TKO	5	Jul 30, 1988	Broadway by the Bay Theater, Atlantic City, New Jersey, U.S.	
4	Win	4–0	Bill Robinson	TKO	3	May 17, 1988	Sands, Atlantic City, New Jersey, U.S.	
3	Win	3–0	Chris Royal	PTS	4	Mar 30, 1988	Saratoga Springs, New York, U.S.	
2	Win	2–0	Anthony Rorie	PTS	4	Feb 5, 1988	Civic Center, Glens Falls, New York, U.S.	
1	Win	1–0	Manuel Braga Opher	UD	4	Jan 23, 1988	Broadway by the Bay Theater, Atlantic City, New Jersey, U.S.	

Sporting positions
Regional boxing titles
Preceded by Rafael Williams	New York light middleweight champion May 28, 1993 – October 1993; Vacated	Vacant Title next held by Frank Houghtaling
Vacant Title last held by Emmett Linton	WBU light middleweight champion May 21, 1997 – December 1998; Vacated	Vacant Title next held by Rashid Matumla
New title	TBA middleweight champion August 9, 2006 – March 2008; Vacated	Title discontinued
World boxing titles
Vacant Title last held by John David Jackson	WBO junior middleweight champion October 30, 1993 – November 22, 1996	Succeeded by Paul Jones
Vacant Title last held by Winky Wright	IBF junior middleweight champion June 5, 2004 – October 2, 2004	Succeeded by Kassim Ouma
Preceded by Cory Spinks	IBF junior middleweight champion March 27, 2008 – November 19, 2008; Vacated	Vacant Title next held by Cory Spinks
