= Bronco McKart =

American boxer

Personal information
- Nickname: Superman
- Born: Bronco Banyon McKart; March 20, 1971 (age 55) Monroe, Michigan, U.S.
- Height: 6 ft 0 in (1.83 m)
- Weight: Welterweight; Light middleweight; Middleweight

Boxing career
- Reach: 72 in (183 cm)
- Stance: Southpaw

Boxing record
- Total fights: 68
- Wins: 56
- Win by KO: 34
- Losses: 11
- Draws: 1

Bronco Banyon McKart (born March 20, 1971) is an American former professional boxer who competed from 1992 to 2014. He held the WBO light middleweight title in 1996 and is best known for his trilogy of fights against Winky Wright.

== Professional career ==
Nicknamed "Superman", McKart turned pro in 1992 and captured the WBO Light Middleweight Title in 1996 by beating Santos Cardona by TKO. He lost the title in his first defense to Winky Wright. In 2000, he had the opportunity to avenge the loss by taking on Wright in an eliminator for IBF Light Middleweight Title. Wright won a dominant decision. In 2002, the two re-matched again, this time for Wright's IBF Light Middleweight Title. McKart was disqualified after trailing severely in the fight.

In 2004, he took on WBA Light Middleweight Title holder Travis Simms, but lost a decision. In 2006, he was knocked out by the then undefeated prospect Kelly Pavlik. He fought Anthony Mundine at the Palms Casino Resort on 14 July 2012. McKart retired in 2014.

== Professional boxing record ==
68 fights	56 wins	11 losses
By knockout	34	4
By decision	21	6
By disqualification	1	1
Draws	1	

No.	Result	Record	Opponent	Type	Round, time	Date	Location	Notes
68	Loss	56–11–1	Tony Harrison	TKO	1 (10), 1:32	30 May 2014	Cobo Center Ballroom, Detroit, Michigan, U.S.	
67	Win	56–10–1	Miguel Angel Munguia	TKO	5 (8), 0:32	27 Nov 2013	Masonic Temple, Detroit, Michigan, U.S.	
66	Win	55–10–1	Dan Wallace	TKO	4 (6), 2:10	13 Sep 2013	Masonic Temple, Detroit, Michigan, U.S.	
65	Loss	54–10–1	Anthony Mundine	TKO	7 (10), 2:04	14 Jul 2012	Palms Casino Resort, Paradise, Nevada, U.S.	For vacant IBF North American middleweight title
64	Win	54–9–1	Jose Medina	MD	12	28 Apr 2012	Huntington Center, Toledo, Ohio, U.S.	Retained UBO middleweight title
63	Win	53–9–1	Michi Munoz	TKO	7 (12), 1:13	30 Oct 2010	High School, Monroe, Michigan, U.S.	Won vacant UBO middleweight title
62	Win	52–9–1	Jose Miguel Rodriguez Berrio	UD	10	27 Feb 2010	County Community College, Monroe, Michigan, U.S.	Won vacant WBF Intercontinental middleweight title
61	Loss	51–9–1	Roman Karmazin	UD	12	20 Dec 2008	Hollywood Park Casino, Inglewood, California, U.S.	For vacant WBC-NABF middleweight title
60	Draw	51–8–1	Raúl Márquez	MD	10	29 Mar 2008	Soaring Eagle Casino, Mount Pleasant, Michigan, U.S.	
59	Loss	51–8	Enrique Ornelas	RTD	5 (12), 3:00	7 Dec 2007	MGM Grand Garden Arena, Paradise, Nevada, U.S.	Lost WBC-NABF middleweight title
58	Win	51–7	Enrique Ornelas	SD	12	10 Aug 2007	New Alhambra Sports & Entertainment Center, Philadelphia, Pennsylvania, U.S.	Won vacant WBC-NABF middleweight title
57	Win	50–7	Clarence Taylor	UD	8	15 Mar 2007	Ameristar Casino, Saint Charles, Missouri, U.S.	
56	Win	49–7	Ted Muller	UD	8	24 Feb 2007	High School, Monroe, Michigan, U.S.	
55	Loss	48–7	Kelly Pavlik	TKO	6 (12), 2:45	27 Jul 2006	Mohegan Sun Casino, Uncasville, Connecticut, U.S.	For WBC-NABF middleweight title
54	Win	48–6	Jose Spearman	UD	8	13 May 2006	Sports Arena, Toledo, Ohio, U.S.	
53	Loss	47–6	Travis Simms	UD	12	2 Oct 2004	Madison Square Garden, New York City, New York, US	For WBA (Regular) light middleweight title
52	Win	47–5	James Johnson	RTD	6 (10), 3:00	17 Jul 2004	Cobo Arena, Detroit, Michigan, U.S.	
51	Win	46–5	Angel Beltre	KO	1 (10), 2:38	18 Jul 2003	Taylor Sportsplex, Taylor, Michigan, U.S.	
50	Loss	45–5	Verno Phillips	UD	10	25 Apr 2003	Thunderbird Wild West Casino, Norman, Oklahoma, U.S.	
49	Loss	45–4	Winky Wright	DQ	8 (12), 2:33	7 Sep 2002	Rose Garden, Portland, Oregon, U.S.	For IBF light middleweight title; McKart disqualified for repeated low blows
48	Win	45–3	Alex Bunema	SD	12	26 Oct 2001	Pechanga Resort and Casino, Temecula, California, U.S.	
47	Win	44–3	Brandon Mitchem	UD	10	8 Jun 2001	Turning Stone Resort & Casino, Verona, New York, U.S.	
46	Win	43–3	Michael Lerma	UD	10	20 Apr 2001	Cintas Center, Cincinnati, Ohio, U.S.	
45	Loss	42–3	Winky Wright	UD	12	9 Sep 2000	Mountaineer Casino Racetrack and Resort, Chester, West Virginia, U.S.	Lost WBC-NABF light middleweight title; For vacant USBA light middleweight title
44	Win	42–2	Jason Papillion	UD	12	10 Jun 2000	Fox Theater, Detroit, Michigan, U.S.	Won WBC-NABF light middleweight title
43	Win	41–2	James Mason	KO	1	29 Apr 2000	Detroit, Michigan, U.S.	
42	Win	40–2	Moises Rivera	KO	2 (10), 1:10	8 Mar 2000	Soaring Eagle Casino, Mount Pleasant, Michigan, U.S.	
41	Win	39–2	Jaime Balboa	KO	3 (10), 2:43	9 Dec 1999	Soaring Eagle Casino, Mount Pleasant, Michigan, U.S.	
40	Win	38–2	Jason Papillion	UD	10	10 Sep 1999	Soaring Eagle Casino, Mount Pleasant, Michigan, U.S.	
39	Win	37–2	Patrick Perez	TKO	1 (10), 2:19	2 Apr 1999	Convention Center, Chattanooga, Tennessee, U.S.	
38	Win	36–2	Rene Francisco Herrera	TKO	8 (10), 3:00	12 Feb 1999	Orleans Hotel & Casino, Paradise, Nevada, U.S.	
37	Win	35–2	Ronald Weaver	UD	12	22 May 1998	Glen Stock Arena, Monroe, Michigan, U.S.	Retained IBA light middleweight title
36	Win	34–2	Kenny Ellis	TKO	9 (10), 1:45	24 Mar 1998	Grand Casino, Tunica, Mississippi, U.S.	
35	Win	33–2	Eric Holland	UD	12	7 Oct 1997	The Palace, Auburn Hills, Michigan, U.S.	Won vacant IBA light middleweight title
34	Win	32–2	Glenwood Brown	UD	10	3 Jun 1997	Blue Horizon, Philadelphia, Pennsylvania, U.S.	
33	Win	31–2	Richard Evans	TKO	3	18 Feb 1997	Blue Horizon, Philadelphia, Pennsylvania, U.S.	
32	Win	30–2	Shane Lanham	KO	1	4 Dec 1996	Toledo, Ohio, U.S.	
31	Win	29–2	Ruben Ruiz	TKO	2 (8), 1:22	26 Aug 1996	Argosy Casino, Kansas City, Missouri, U.S.	
30	Loss	28–2	Winky Wright	SD	12	17 May 1996	Glen Stock Arena, Monroe, Michigan, U.S.	Lost WBO light middleweight title
29	Win	28–1	Santos Cardona	TKO	9 (12), 0:41	1 Mar 1996	Fantasy Springs Casino, Indio, California, U.S.	Won vacant WBO light middleweight title
28	Win	27–1	Javier Francisco Mendez	TKO	2	21 Nov 1995	The Palace, Auburn Hills, Michigan, U.S.	
27	Win	26–1	Wendell Hall	TKO	1 (10), 1:43	26 Sep 1995	The Palace, Auburn Hills, Michigan, U.S.	
26	Win	25–1	Aaron Davis	SD	12	2 Jun 1995	Foxwoods Resort, Ledyard, Connecticut, U.S.	Retained WBC International light middleweight title
25	Win	24–1	Eric Alexander	TKO	1 (10), 2:21	22 Apr 1995	MGM Grand Garden Arena, Paradise, Nevada, U.S.	
24	Win	23–1	Roosevelt Booth	KO	3 (10)	20 Mar 1995	The Palace, Auburn Hills, Michigan, U.S.	
23	Win	22–1	Darrell Woods	TKO	8 (10), 2:51	19 Jan 1995	The Palace, Auburn Hills, Michigan, U.S.	
22	Win	21–1	Ian Garrett	TKO	9 (10), 1:23	6 Dec 1994	The Palace, Auburn Hills, Michigan, U.S.	
21	Win	20–1	Engels Pedroza	TKO	7 (12), 2:42	20 Oct 1994	Foxwoods Resort, Ledyard, Connecticut, U.S.	Retained WBC International light middleweight title
20	Win	19–1	Alain Bonnamie	RTD	6 (12), 3:00	21 Jul 1994	Foxwoods Resort, Ledyard, Connecticut, U.S.	Won WBC International light middleweight title
19	Win	18–1	Bryan Blakely	RTD	5 (10), 3:00	20 May 1994	Detroit, Michigan, U.S.	Won vacant USA Michigan State welterweight title
18	Win	17–1	Brandon Croly	KO	8 (10)	26 Apr 1994	The Palace, Auburn Hills, Michigan, U.S.	
17	Win	16–1	Skipper Kelp	TKO	6 (8)	5 Mar 1994	Olympic Auditorium, Los Angeles, California, U.S.	
16	Win	15–1	Mike Powell	TKO	4 (10)	25 Jan 1994	The Palace, Auburn Hills, Michigan, U.S.	
15	Win	14–1	William Ruiz	KO	3 (10), 2:12	18 Nov 1993	The Palace, Auburn Hills, Michigan, U.S.	
14	Win	13–1	Gerald Reed	TKO	2 (6)	29 Oct 1993	Civic Center, Tulsa, Oklahoma, U.S.	
13	Win	12–1	Terry Ford	TKO	2, 1:45	21 Sep 1993	The Palace, Auburn Hills, Michigan, U.S.	
12	Win	11–1	Joe Johnson	TKO	1 (6), 2:33	24 Aug 1993	The Palace, Auburn Hills, Michigan, U.S.	
11	Win	10–1	Greg Johnson	PTS	6	29 Jul 1993	Fernwood Resort, Bushkill, Pennsylvania, U.S.	
10	Win	9–1	George Taylor	UD	4	25 May 1993	The Palace, Auburn Hills, Michigan, U.S.	
9	Win	8–1	Robert West	TKO	5	10 Apr 1993	Toledo, Ohio, U.S.	
8	Loss	7–1	Clayton Williams	UD	4	13 Feb 1993	Caesars Palace, Paradise, Nevada, U.S.	
7	Win	7–0	Larry Sutton	PTS	4	15 Jan 1993	SeaGate Convention Centre, Toledo, Ohio, U.S.	
6	Win	6–0	Larry Benson	UD	4	12 Jan 1993	The Palace, Auburn Hills, Michigan, U.S.	
5	Win	5–0	Dave Clark	UD	4	4 Nov 1992	Club Bijou, Toledo, Ohio, U.S.	
4	Win	4–0	Anthony Collier	DQ	4	27 Oct 1992	The Palace, Auburn Hills, Michigan, U.S.	Collier disqualified for slapping the referee
3	Win	3–0	Bernard Grant	PTS	4	22 Sep 1992	The Palace, Auburn Hills, Michigan, U.S.	
2	Win	2–0	Franklin Robinson	KO	1 (4), 2:03	25 Aug 1992	The Palace, Auburn Hills, Michigan, U.S.	
1	Win	1–0	Bruce Anderson	TKO	1 (4)	21 Jul 1992	The Palace, Auburn Hills, Michigan, U.S.	

== See also ==
- List of WBO world champions

Sporting positions
Regional boxing titles
Vacant Title last held by Ronnie Harris	USA Michigan State welterweight champion 20 May 1994 – Dec 1994; Vacated	Title discontinued
Preceded by Alain Bonnamie	WBC International light middleweight champion 21 Jul 1994 – Jan 1996; Vacated	Vacant Title next held by Akhmet Dottuev
Preceded by Jason Papillion	NABF light middleweight champion 10 Jun 2000 – 9 Sep 2000	Succeeded by Winky Wright
Vacant Title last held by Kelly Pavlik	NABF middleweight champion 10 Aug 2007 – 7 Dec 2007	Succeeded by Enrique Ornelas
Vacant Title last held by Vitor Sa	WBF Intercontinental middleweight champion 27 Feb 2010 – Apr 2010; Vacated	Vacant Title next held by Héctor Camacho Jr.
New title	UBO middleweight champion 30 Oct 2010 – May 2013; Vacated	Vacant Title next held by Aliklych Kanbolatov
Minor world boxing titles
Vacant Title last held by Emmett Linton	IBA light middleweight champion 7 Oct 1997 – Jan 2000; Vacated	Vacant Title next held by Santos Cardona
Major world boxing titles
Vacant Title last held by Paul Jones	WBO light middleweight champion 1 Mar 1996 – 17 May 1996	Succeeded by Winky Wright
