= Carlos Bojorquez =

Mexican boxer (born 1972)

Personal information
- Nickname: El Elegante
- Born: 26 June 1972 (age 54) Los Mochis, Sinaloa, Mexico
- Height: 1.78 m (5 ft 10 in)
- Weight: Light middleweight

Boxing career
- Stance: Orthodox

Boxing record
- Total fights: 42
- Wins: 26
- Win by KO: 22
- Losses: 10
- Draws: 6

Carlos Bojorquez (born 26 June 1972) is a Mexican professional boxer who competed from 1997 to 2007, challenging for the IBF light middleweight title in 2004.

== Professional career ==
He has fought for the vacant IBF Light Middleweight title and has held a number of fringe belts. Throughout his long career he has fought top fighters such as Verno Phillips, Pernell Whitaker, and Ike Quartey. His final fight ended in a points decision (as opposed to a finish, which is usually the case for Bojorquez) loss to Eduardo Sánchez (15–6–2).
