= Winky Wright =

American boxer (born 1971)

Personal information
- Nickname: Winky
- Born: Ronald Lamont Wright; November 26, 1971 (age 54) Washington, D.C., U.S.
- Height: 5 ft 10 in (178 cm)
- Weight: Welterweight; Light middleweight; Middleweight; Light heavyweight

Boxing career
- Reach: 73 in (185 cm)
- Stance: Southpaw

Boxing record
- Total fights: 58
- Wins: 51
- Win by KO: 25
- Losses: 6
- Draws: 1

Ronald Lamont "Winky" Wright (born November 26, 1971) is an American former professional boxer who competed from 1990 to 2012. He is a two-time light middleweight world champion and was the last to hold the undisputed title at that weight until Jermell Charlo in 2022. In his later career he also challenged for a unified middleweight world title. He announced his retirement from boxing in 2012, following a loss to Peter Quillin.

In 2005, The Ring magazine ranked him as the world's second best active boxer, pound for pound. In 2017, it was announced that Wright had been elected as an International Boxing Hall of Fame member in the Modern Category, alongside Vitali Klitschko and Érik Morales, with the induction ceremony scheduled for June 2018. Wright is known for the use of the high guard and is widely considered one of the greatest defensive boxers of all time.

== Professional career ==
=== Early years ===
After his second-round knockout of Carlos Santana on July 30, 1992, in St. Petersburg, Florida, the ring announcer called him "Winky" Wright, the name given to him by his grandmother when he was 6 months old and that had unofficially stuck with him since he was 18 months old. The nickname stuck with him for the rest of his career following his win over Santana.

Major promoters like Don King and Lou Duva declined to work with Wright early in his career. His first promoters were the France-based Acaries brothers, who struck a deal for Wright to fight Darryl Lattimore in Luxembourg on January 1, 1993. Wright knocked Lattimore down three times and the fight was stopped. He then went on a tear during his tour of Europe, winning eight straight in France, Germany, and Monte Carlo while only fighting in the United States once over the next year.

=== First title shot ===
On August 21, 1994, Wright received his first title match against WBA light-middleweight champion Julio César Vásquez in Saint-Jean-de-Luz, France. Although he was 25–0 at the time, Wright had not fought in a match that had gone more than 8 rounds. His inexperience showed as he lost a unanimous decision in controversial fashion, with Vasquez knocking down Wright in the second, seventh and ninth rounds, and twice in the twelfth round. Wright officially slipped three times and unofficially another four times while also appearing to win all but one round on points.

On February 4, 1995, Wright defeated Tony Marshall by unanimous decision to win the vacant NABF light-middleweight title.

=== Ongoing world tour and winning the WBO title ===
Wright continued fighting in Europe, only fighting in the United States once, until his unanimous decision victory against Andrew Council on March 5, 1996. His impressive win opened the door to fight WBO light-middleweight champion Bronco McKart, a fight Wright won by split decision. Wright successfully defend his title in England three times; twice in Manchester against local fighters Ensley Bingham and Steve Foster, and Adrian Dodson in London.

Wright then traveled to South Africa where he lost his world title in controversial circumstances to the undefeated Harry Simon. After a very close contest the fight was initially ruled a draw, then minutes later changed to a majority decision win for Simon due to an apparent scoring error.

=== Moving to America ===
He stopped working with the Acaries brothers in 1999, stating that he was tired of all the travelling. He went on to knock out Derrick Graham in the third round in Miami, Florida. Wright then challenged IBF light-middleweight champion Fernando Vargas. Although some ringside fans and members of the media felt that Wright had won the fight, Vargas ended up winning a controversial majority decision. Harold Lederman (a ringside boxing broadcaster for HBO whose job is to unofficially score fights) scored the bout 115–113, for Wright.

Wright continued to defend the NABF and won the USBA light-middleweight title in another decision over Bronco McKart.

=== IBF champion ===
Félix Trinidad's jump to the middleweight division left the IBF light-middleweight title vacant. Wright scored a unanimous decision over Robert Frazier on October 12, 2001 to win the vacant title. In his first defense on February 2, 2002, Wright stopped Jason Papillion in the fifth round. He took a third fight against Bronco McKart, which ended in controversy as the referee disqualified McKart for repeated low blows in the 8th round.

For Wright's next fight, Oscar De La Hoya offered to fight him. However, because of the lack of money The Golden Boy was willing to give Wright for the fight, the deal fell through and Oscar fought Luis Ramon Campas for the WBA/WBC titles. Wright went on to debut on National Television Las Vegas against Juan Carlos Candelo on March 1, 2003 in a title defense, winning a unanimous decision. He followed that up with another blowout victory over Angel Hernandez 8 months later.

=== Wright vs. Mosley I & II ===
To the surprise of many, including Wright, Shane Mosley challenged Winky to a light-middleweight unification title fight on March 13, 2004. Mosley was a celebrated fighter coming off his second win against Oscar De La Hoya and was looking for a tune-up fight to prepare for a super fight with Félix Trinidad. Shane had stated that he wanted to fight the winner of the fight between Wright and Angel Hernandez. Wright, being the winner, earned a fight with Shane Mosley. Wright was a 5 to 2 underdog against Mosley. During the fight, Wright pressed his will early on and discouraged Mosley with his size, effective jabbing and defense. Winky won a lopsided unanimous decision, unifying his IBF title with Mosley's Lineal/The Ring/WBC/WBA titles, to become undisputed light middleweight champion.

The rematch took place on November 20, 2004. This fight was much closer. Two judges scored 115–113 for Wright and one judge scored the bout a draw. Wright was awarded the majority decision. Soon after, Wright would vacate his titles to move up to the middleweight division to challenge Félix Trinidad.

=== Wright vs. Trinidad ===
On May 14, 2005, with Wright once again playing the underdog role, he defeated Félix Trinidad by unanimous decision. Wright's signature style defence and piston-like jab was too much for the Puerto Rican hero as Trinidad was having trouble landing punches throughout the fight (Two judges scored the fight 119–108 and one judge scored it 120–107). As a result of his dominant victory over such a highly regarded opponent, many placed Wright among the top pound-for-pound boxers in the world. His victory would send Trinidad into his second retirement for three years.

Trinidad-Wright was also a WBC middleweight eliminator, giving Wright a shot at undisputed middleweight champion Jermain Taylor for his titles.

Following his win over Trinidad, Oscar De La Hoya approached Wright with a $6 million offer, plus an additional $6 per pay-per-view buy above 600,000 homes. However, Wright declined the fight, "He offers everyone else $10, 15 million," Wright said, referring to the $10 million Trinidad received for fighting De La Hoya in 1999. "I ain't doing it." Wright also declined an offer to face Floyd Mayweather during that time, insisting on a 50-50 split, "Winky has everything to lose but nothing to gain," Wright's promoter Gary Shaw stated. "Mayweather has nothing to lose and everything to gain."

=== Middleweight title shot ===
After winning a unanimous decision over Sam Soliman in December 2005, Wright faced off against undisputed middleweight champion Jermain Taylor on June 17, 2006, at the FedEx Forum in Memphis, Tennessee for the Lineal/The Ring/WBC/WBO titles. In a very close fight, the match was ruled a draw. Two judges scored the bout 115–113 for each fighter, while the final judge scored it 114–114. Both camps attempted at negotiating a rematch, but talks failed after neither side could agree on how to split the money—a problem attributed to Wright's insistence on parity and Taylor's reluctance to give 50 percent to a challenger.

Wright returned to defeat Ike Quartey at middleweight by a unanimous twelve-round decision at St. Pete Times Forum, Tampa, Florida in December 2006. Two judges scored the fight 117–110, and one had the bout 117–109, all for Wright.

=== Hopkins vs. Wright ===
Wright's next fight came against Bernard Hopkins at a catch weight of 170 pounds on July 21, 2007. The bout aired on HBO pay-per-view. In the early rounds of the fight, there was no love lost as Hopkins outpointed Wright until a clash of heads (ruled unintentional) by Hopkins left a deep gash over Wright's eyebrow leading to Wright becoming the aggressor in the fight. Now fighting with a sense of urgency, Wright gave Hopkins problems due to his tight defense guarding the cut and landing combinations from the outside. Hopkins seemed to stick through the pressure and land flush combinations targeting the bloody eye. Hopkins won via unanimous decision on the judges' score cards (116–112, 117–111, 117–111).

It was Winky's first loss in eight years. In the post-fight interview, Wright was asked why he took the fight. He responded by saying, "I wanted to show everybody that I'm the best fighter out there, regardless of weight. If I fight the best, then I'll be the best."

=== Later years ===
Wright ended a 21-month layoff when he faced former welterweight title holder Paul "The Punisher" Williams in a middleweight bout at Mandalay Bay, Las Vegas in April 2009. Wright lost via decision. Two judges scored the bout 119–109 for Williams while the 3rd judge scored the bout 120–108 for Williams. Wright won only the 5th round on two judges cards, while the 3rd judge scored all the rounds for Paul Williams.

After several failed attempts to stay active after the one-sided sweep by Paul Williams, Wright decided to get surgery on his knee during his inactivity, in the summer of 2010. Wright's most recent attempts were to get fights with Middleweight Champion Sergio Martínez, who knocked out Williams, and also a 160 lb. fight with Kelly Pavlik. He, however, successfully landed a fight with contender Grady Brewer on December 11, 2009 in San Juan, Puerto Rico. Wright and Brewer were ready and set to do battle until weeks before the fight, the promoters shut the PPV matchup down due to poor ticket sales.

On November 16, 2010, it surfaced on the internet that Wright's grandmother, Mary Dorsey, had died on November 3. When asked to give his thoughts on what had happened, Winky credited his grandmother for everything he had accomplished during his boxing career, in which he primarily stated that he wouldn't have been world champion if it wasn't for her. After the new year of 2011, Wright came out and gave his side and strategies to the Super Fight between Shane Mosley and Manny Pacquiao. During the interview, he also stated that he'll be coming back to fight on April 9 on the undercard of Marques-Morales against Matthew Macklin. Although it was not a title fight, both fighters have hopes that with the win over each other, they would have a shot at the Middleweight Champion Sergio Martínez at 160 lbs. Once again, weeks before the PPV the fight had to be canceled due to an injury to Winky's right hand.

Shortly after the showdown between Bernard Hopkins and Chad Dawson was made, it was stated that Dawson would not be working with trainer Emanuel Steward and instead would work with his previous trainer John Scully. Wright, being a good friend of Dawson's, offered to help him on his upcoming fight while getting him into physical shape. He stated in a brief, short interview, "No, I'm not a trainer and I'm not training Dawson. The fighting part of my career isn't even over, why would I want to start training? I'm just there to give advice and pointers to Dawson. Help him prepare for Hopkins and his dirty tactics. Hopkins is a dirty fighter." In an October interview, he stated that he will once again be coming back stating, "The junior middleweight division is full of people that call themselves champions when they ain't fought nobody. I'm coming back to take what's rightfully mine." He also stated that he'd made a mistake with just coming back and taking on a fighter like Paul Williams. He confirmed that he's going to take a couple tune-up fights hoping to grab one by December. He also, in the interview, he expressed interest in fighting WBA Light Middleweight Champion Miguel Cotto, WBC Light Middleweight Champion Saul Alvarez and The Ring Middleweight Champion Sergio Martínez in the future.

After a 3-year hiatus from boxing, Wright was expected to face Peter Quillin on May 26, 2012, but the date was changed to June 2, 2012 in order to satisfy the California State Athletic Commission. Quillin defeated Wright via a ten-round unanimous decision. Wright announced his retirement shortly after the fight.

== Professional boxing record ==
58 fights	51 wins	6 losses
By knockout	25	0
By decision	25	6
By disqualification	1	0
Draws	1	

No.	Result	Record	Opponent	Type	Round, time	Date	Location	Notes
58	Loss	51–6–1	Peter Quillin	UD	10	Jun 2, 2012	Home Depot Center, Carson, California, U.S.	
57	Loss	51–5–1	Paul Williams	UD	12	Apr 11, 2009	Mandalay Bay Events Center, Paradise, Nevada, U.S.	
56	Loss	51–4–1	Bernard Hopkins	UD	12	Jul 21, 2007	Mandalay Bay Events Center, Paradise, Nevada, U.S.	For The Ring light heavyweight title
55	Win	51–3–1	Ike Quartey	UD	12	Dec 2, 2006	St. Pete Times Forum, Tampa, Florida, U.S.	
54	Draw	50–3–1	Jermain Taylor	SD	12	Jun 17, 2006	FedExForum, Memphis, Tennessee, U.S.	For WBC, WBO, and The Ring middleweight titles
53	Win	50–3	Sam Soliman	UD	12	Dec 10, 2005	Mohegan Sun Arena, Montville, Connecticut, U.S.	
52	Win	49–3	Félix Trinidad	UD	12	May 14, 2005	MGM Grand Garden Arena, Paradise, Nevada, U.S.	
51	Win	48–3	Shane Mosley	MD	12	Nov 20, 2004	Mandalay Bay Events Center, Paradise, Nevada, U.S.	Retained WBA (Unified), WBC, and The Ring light middleweight titles
50	Win	47–3	Shane Mosley	UD	12	Mar 13, 2004	Mandalay Bay Events Center, Paradise, Nevada, U.S.	Retained IBF light middleweight title; Won WBA (Unified), WBC, and The Ring light middleweight titles
49	Win	46–3	Ángel Hernández	UD	12	Nov 8, 2003	Mandalay Bay Events Center, Paradise, Nevada, U.S.	Retained IBF light middleweight title
48	Win	45–3	Juan Carlos Candelo	UD	12	Mar 1, 2003	Thomas & Mack Center, Paradise, Nevada, U.S.	Retained IBF light middleweight title
47	Win	44–3	Bronco McKart	DQ	8 (12), 2:33	Sep 7, 2002	Rose Garden, Portland, Oregon, U.S.	Retained IBF light middleweight title
46	Win	43–3	Jason Papillion	TKO	5 (12), 2:44	Feb 2, 2002	American Airlines Arena, Miami, Florida, U.S.	Retained IBF light middleweight title
45	Win	42–3	Robert Frazier	UD	12	Oct 12, 2001	Fantasy Springs Resort Casino, Indio, California, U.S.	Won vacant IBF light middleweight title
44	Win	41–3	Keith Mullings	UD	12	Dec 16, 2000	David L. Lawrence Convention Center, Pittsburgh, Pennsylvania, U.S.	Retained NABF and USBA light middleweight titles
43	Win	40–3	Bronco McKart	UD	12	Sep 9, 2000	Mountaineer Casino Racetrack and Resort, Chester, West Virginia, U.S.	Won NABF and vacant USBA light middleweight titles
42	Loss	39–3	Fernando Vargas	MD	12	Dec 4, 1999	Chinook Winds Casino, Lincoln City, Oregon, U.S.	For IBF light middleweight title
41	Win	39–2	Derrick Graham	KO	3 (12)	Mar 27, 1999	Jai-Alai Fronton, Miami, Florida, U.S.	
40	Loss	38–2	Harry Simon	MD	12	Aug 22, 1998	Carousel Casino, Hammanskraal, South Africa	Lost WBO light middleweight title
39	Win	38–1	Adrian Dodson	TKO	6 (12), 3:00	Dec 19, 1997	London Arena, London, England	Retained WBO light middleweight title
38	Win	37–1	Steve Foster	TKO	6 (12), 2:52	May 3, 1997	NYNEX Arena, Manchester, England	Retained WBO light middleweight title
37	Win	36–1	Ensley Bingham	UD	12	Nov 9, 1996	NYNEX Arena, Manchester, England	Retained WBO light middleweight title
36	Win	35–1	Bronco McKart	SD	12	May 17, 1996	Stock Arena, Monroe, Michigan, U.S.	Won WBO light middleweight title
35	Win	34–1	Andrew Council	UD	12	Mar 5, 1996	Scope, Norfolk, Virginia, U.S.	Retained NABF light middleweight title
34	Win	33–1	Jean Paul D'Alessandro	UD	8	Jan 6, 1996	Palais des sports Marcel-Cerdan, Levallois-Perret, France	
33	Win	32–1	Young Dick Tiger	TKO	9 (10)	Oct 23, 1995	Great Western Forum, Inglewood, California, U.S.	
32	Win	31–1	Anthony Ivory	UD	12	Aug 23, 1995	La Palestre, Le Cannet, France	Retained NABF light middleweight title
31	Win	30–1	Larry LaCoursiere	TKO	1	Jul 25, 1995	Saint-Jean-de-Luz, France	
30	Win	29–1	Leon Cessiron	PTS	6	Apr 11, 1995	Palais des sports Marcel-Cerdan, Levallois-Perret, France	
29	Win	28–1	Anthony Ivory	PTS	8	Apr 1, 1995	La Palestre, Le Cannet, France	
28	Win	27–1	Tony Marshall	UD	12	Feb 4, 1995	Palais des Sports, Castelnau-le-Lez, France	Won vacant NABF light middleweight title
27	Win	26–1	Ernesto Rafael Sena	RTD	2 (10), 3:00	Nov 11, 1994	Club Caja Popular, San Miguel de Tucumán, Argentina	
26	Loss	25–1	Julio César Vásquez	UD	12	Aug 21, 1994	Jai Alai, Saint-Jean-de-Luz, France	For WBA light middleweight title
25	Win	25–0	Orlando Orozco	TKO	1 (8)	Jun 4, 1994	Palais des sports Marcel-Cerdan, Levallois-Perret, France	
24	Win	24–0	Armando Herrera	KO	1 (8)	Mar 19, 1994	Palais des sports Marcel-Cerdan, Levallois-Perret, France	
23	Win	23–0	Tony McCrimmion	TKO	5	Dec 4, 1993	Palais des sports Marcel-Cerdan, Levallois-Perret, France	
22	Win	22–0	Gilberto Barreto	TKO	2 (10)	Oct 16, 1993	Palais des sports Marcel-Cerdan, Levallois-Perret, France	
21	Win	21–0	Leon Rouse	KO	1 (8)	Aug 21, 1993	Salle des Etoiles, Monte Carlo, Monaco	
20	Win	20–0	James Stokes	KO	1 (8), 1:20	May 28, 1993	Charlotte County Memorial Auditorium, Punta Gorda, Florida, U.S.	
19	Win	19–0	Eric Holland	UD	8	Mar 20, 1993	Philips Halle, Düsseldorf, Germany	
18	Win	18–0	Roland Commings	UD	8	Jan 31, 1993	Levallois-Perret, France	
17	Win	17–0	Darryl Lattimore	TKO	1 (8), 2:31	Jan 2, 1993	Differdange, Luxembourg	
16	Win	16–0	Carlos Santana	TKO	2 (10), 2:53	Jul 30, 1992	Hyatt Regency, Tampa, Florida, U.S.	
15	Win	15–0	Delfino Marin	TKO	1 (10), 2:07	May 28, 1992	USF Sun Dome, Tampa, Florida, U.S.	
14	Win	14–0	Mike Howard	TKO	4 (8)	Mar 27, 1992	USF Sun Dome, Tampa, Florida, U.S.	
13	Win	13–0	Persephone Van Reenen	TKO	3 (6), 1:22	Feb 28, 1992	USF Sun Dome, Tampa, Florida, U.S.	
12	Win	12–0	Lennell Strohman	UD	6	Dec 13, 1991	USF Sun Dome, Tampa, Florida, U.S.	
11	Win	11–0	Gary McCall	RTD	1 (6), 3:00	Nov 15, 1991	USF Sun Dome, Tampa, Florida, U.S.	
10	Win	10–0	Glenn Major	TKO	2 (6)	Oct 18, 1991	USF Sun Dome, Tampa, Florida, U.S.	
9	Win	9–0	Jeff Johnson	UD	6	Sep 17, 1991	Marriott's World Center, Orlando, Florida, U.S.	
8	Win	8–0	Edison Martinez	TKO	1 (6), 1:46	Aug 30, 1991	Marriott's World Center, Orlando, Florida, U.S.	
7	Win	7–0	Rocky Fabrizio	UD	6	Aug 13, 1991	Hyatt Regency, Tampa, Florida, U.S.	
6	Win	6–0	Lorenzo Bouie	UD	6	Jul 26, 1991	Hyatt Regency, Tampa, Florida, U.S.	
5	Win	5–0	Glenn Major	RTD	3 (6), 3:00	Mar 29, 1991	Convention Center, Tampa, Florida, U.S.	
4	Win	4–0	Stedroy Bolus	TKO	3 (4)	Jan 25, 1991	Diplomat Resort & Spa, Hollywood, Florida, U.S.	
3	Win	3–0	Tony Graham	TKO	2	Dec 14, 1990	Diplomat Resort & Spa, Hollywood, Florida, U.S.	
2	Win	2–0	Christopher Conrad	TKO	1	Nov 28, 1990	Hyatt Regency, Tampa, Florida, U.S.	
1	Win	1–0	Anthony Salerno	UD	4	Oct 16, 1990	Hyatt Regency, Tampa, Florida, U.S.	

== Titles in boxing ==
=== Major world titles ===
- WBA (Unified) light middleweight champion (154 lbs)
- WBC light middleweight champion (154 lbs)
- IBF light middleweight champion (154 lbs)
- WBO light middleweight champion (154 lbs)

=== The Ring magazine titles ===
- The Ring light middleweight champion (154 lbs)

=== Regional/International titles ===
- NABF light middleweight champion (154 lbs) (2×)
- USBA light middleweight champion (154 lbs)

=== Undisputed titles ===
- Undisputed light middleweight champion (Note: First and only three-belt era undisputed light middleweight champion.)

== Filmography ==
Year	Title	Role	Notes
2004	The Jury	Winky Wright	TV series; 1 episode
2005	State Property 2	Winky Wright	Cameo appearance
2006	Loren Cass	Voice 1	Feature film

== Life outside the ring ==
Wright has appeared in music videos for Busta Rhymes' "Touch It Remix", 50 Cent's "Outta Control Remix", Jamie Foxx's "DJ Play a Love Song", and 2 Pistols's "She Got It" . He also appeared briefly in the cult hit State Property 2 along with Dame Dash and Beanie Sigel.

Wright has previously entered into ventures and endorsements with brands such as Reebok, Vitamin Water, Rocawear, State Property and 2(x)ist men's underwear among many others. Through these partnerships, Wright has appeared in television commercials and ad campaigns around New York City and in Men's Fitness, Men's Health, VIBE and VIBE VixeN magazines.

He currently owns an independent record label, Pound 4 Pound Records, also based in St. Petersburg, Florida. The label consists of a talent roster which covers genres of music from rock & roll to hip hop.

Wright now has his own promotion company called Winky Promotions.

Wright married Sayquana Barney on August 1, 2009. Winky often participates in charity events, in which he also has his own charity event called Winky Wright Foundation which gives him the opportunity to give back to the community. He currently resides in his hometown St. Petersburg, Florida.

== See also ==
- List of world light-middleweight boxing champions

== Notes and references ==
=== References ===
Sporting positions
Regional boxing titles
Vacant Title last held by Julio César Green	NABF light middleweight champion February 4, 1995 – May 1996; Vacated	Vacant Title next held by Steve Martinez
Preceded by Bronco McKart	NABF light middleweight champion September 9, 2000 – October 2001; Vacated	Vacant Title next held by Ángel Hernández
Vacant Title last held by Jose Flores	USBA light middleweight champion September 9, 2000 – October 2001; Vacated	Vacant Title next held by Kassim Ouma
World boxing titles
Preceded by Bronco McKart	WBO light middleweight champion May 17, 1996 – August 22, 1998	Succeeded by Harry Simon
Vacant Title last held by Félix Trinidad	IBF light middleweight champion October 12, 2001 – April 19, 2004; Vacated	Vacant Title next held by Verno Phillips
Preceded by Shane Mosley	WBA light middleweight champion Unified title March 13, 2004 – March 20, 2005; Vacated	Vacant Title next held by Miguel Cotto
Preceded by Shane Mosley	WBC light middleweight champion March 13, 2004 – March 5, 2005; Vacated	Vacant Title next held by Ricardo Mayorga
Preceded by Shane Mosley	The Ring light middleweight champion March 13, 2004 – November 2, 2005; Vacated	Vacant Title next held by Canelo Álvarez
Vacant Title last held by Koichi Wajima	Undisputed light middleweight champion March 13 – April 19, 2004; Titles fragmented	Vacant Title next held by Jermell Charlo
