= Oscar De La Hoya vs. Arturo Gatti =

A Real Hero Returns
- Date: March 24, 2001
- Venue: MGM Grand Garden Arena, Paradise, Nevada, U.S.

Tale of the tape
Boxer	Oscar De La Hoya	Arturo Gatti
Nickname	The Golden Boy	Thunder
Hometown	East Los Angeles, California, U.S.	Montreal, Quebec, Canada
Purse	$5,000,000	$1,500,000
Pre-fight record	32–2 (26 KO)	33–4 (27 KO)
Age	28 years, 1 month	28 years, 11 months
Height	5 ft 11 in (180 cm)	5 ft 11 in (180 cm)
Weight	147 lb (67 kg)	146 lb (66 kg)
Style	Orthodox	Orthodox
Recognition	WBC; No. 1 Ranked Welterweight; The Ring; No. 2 Ranked Welterweight; The Ring No. 4 ranked pound-for-pound 3-division world champion	WBA; No. 4 Ranked Welterweight; WBC; No. 4 Ranked Light Welterweight; Former IBF junior lightweight champion

Result
- De La Hoya wins via 5th-round technical knockout

Oscar De La Hoya vs. Arturo Gatti, billed as A Real Hero Returns, was a professional boxing match contested on March 24, 2001.

== Background ==
In his previous fight, Oscar De La Hoya had lost the WBC welterweight title to Shane Mosley by a close split decision on June 17, 2000. Following his loss, De La Hoya would go on a nine-month hiatus, as a rift with promoter Bob Arum led to De La Hoya filing a lawsuit in an attempt to sever his promotional contract with Arum. Though his initial lawsuit was still unresolved and his contract with Arum had not legally been nullified with Arum, De La Hoya announced that he would exclusively be promoted by Jerry Perenchio, the billionaire CEO and chairman of Univision, causing Arum to countersue citing interference from Perenchio in regards to his contract with De La Hoya. In January 2001, the lawsuit was settled when a Los Angeles judge ruled in favor of De La Hoya, officially nullifying his contract with Arum and paving the way for him to continue on with Perenchio as his promoter. Arum was not the only member of De La Hoya's team that he decided to replace; his longtime trainer Robert Alcazar was dismissed in September 2000 after having been criticized and blamed for De La Hoya having lost twice in his last three fights, as was legendary cutman Chuck Bodak who was replaced with Joe Souza. De La Hoya ultimately decided to hire Floyd Mayweather Sr. as his new trainer praising Mayweather afterwards claiming "If I had Mayweather a long time ago, I'd be undefeated." while also criticizing Alcazar and his other previous trainers stating "It's a shame that I had the trainers I had before. But that's how things are."

Only days after the settlement was announced, De La Hoya announced the end of his nine-month hiatus and his return to boxing to face former IBF junior lightweight champion Arturo Gatti in March of that same year. De La Hoya would also announce his intentions for the bout to be his final fight as a welterweight before moving up to the super welterweight division in his next fight. However, before the fight would happen, De La Hoya announced another lawsuit, this time against TV network HBO, who broadcast De La Hoya's fights for a long time, in an attempt to sever his existing exclusive contract with the network, which had four fights remaining, in order to gain another, higher-paying pact with them. A week later, a judge would once again rule in favor of De La Hoya, officially ending his contract with HBO and effectively making him a free agent with the ability to shop his fight with Gatti to another network of his choosing, though a deal was ultimately reached that would see the fight broadcast on HBO.

== The Fight ==
De La Hoya dominated an overmatched Gatti, flooring him with a left hand 12 seconds in the first round and then continuing to land punches and combination almost at will throughout the remainder of the fight. De La Hoya would open a cut under Gatti's left eye which would hinder Gatti to the point that the fight was briefly stopped in the third round to allow Gatti to wipe the blood from the wound. Finally, at 1:16 of the fifth round, with Gatti suffering from constant abuse, Gatti's manager Pat Lynch threw a towel into the ring to signify surrender. Referee Jay Nady immediately acknowledged the towel and stopped the fight, giving De La Hoya the victory by technical knockout.

== Fight card ==
Confirmed bouts:

Weight Class	Weight		vs.		Method	Round	Notes
Welterweight	147 lbs.	Oscar De La Hoya	def.	Arturo Gatti	TKO	5/12
Cruiserweight	190 lbs.	Vassiliy Jirov	def.	Terry McGroom	KO	1/12	^{note 1}
Super Welterweight	154 lbs.	Rafael Pineda	def.	Oba Carr	TKO	6/10
Super Flyweight	115 lbs.	José Navarro	def.	Antonio Perez	UD	6/6
Super Lightweight	140 lbs.	Ricardo Williams Jr.	def.	Joey Bullock	UD	4/4
Heavyweight	200+ lbs.	Paolo Vidoz	def.	Marcus Johnson	UD	4/4

^Note 1 For IBF Cruiserweight title

== Broadcasting ==
Country	Broadcaster
Australia	Main Event
United States	HBO

Preceded by vs. Shane Mosley	Oscar De La Hoya's bouts 24 March 2001	Succeeded by vs. Javier Castillejo
Preceded by vs. Joe Hutchinson	Arturo Gatti's bouts 24 March 2001	Succeeded by vs. Terron Millett
