= Winky Wright vs. Shane Mosley II =

Boxing match

Melee at Mandalay
- Date: November 20, 2004
- Venue: Mandalay Bay Events Center, Paradise, Nevada, U.S.
- Title(s) on the line: WBA, WBC and The Ring light middleweight titles

Tale of the tape
Boxer	Ronald Wright	Shane Mosley
Nickname	Winky	Sugar
Hometown	Washington, D.C., District of Columbia, U.S.	Pomona, California, U.S.
Purse	$1,600,000 to $2,000,000	$1,900,00 to $2,000,000
Pre-fight record	47–3 (25 KO)	39–3 (1) (35 KO)
Age	32 years, 11 months	33 years, 2 months
Height	5 ft 10 in (178 cm)	5 ft 9 in (175 cm)
Weight	154 lb (70 kg)	154 lb (70 kg)
Style	Southpaw	Orthodox
Recognition	WBA, WBC and The Ring; Light Middleweight Champion; The Ring pound-for-pound No. 4 ranked fighter	WBA/WBC; No. 3 Ranked Light Middleweight; The Ring; No. 1 Ranked Light Middleweight; 3-division world champion

Result
- Wright wins by majority decision (115–113, 115–113, 114–114)

Winky Wright vs. Shane Mosley II, billed as Melee at Mandalay, was a professional boxing match contested on November 20, 2004, for the WBA, WBC and The Ring light middleweight championship.

== Background ==
Following his upset defeat at the hands of Winky Wright, Shane Mosley's promoter Gary Shaw confirmed that they planned to exercise the rematch cause in the contract. Mosley was reportedly offered a deal to step aside to allow Wright fight Félix Trinidad. The rematch caused the IBF to strip Wright for not facing mandatory challenger Kassim Ouma and instead accepting a rematch with Mosley.

Wright meanwhile was involved in a promotional dispute, with his contract with his existing promotor Square Ring expiring, despite having reportedly agreed a verbal agreement to resign with them, he initially signed with Lou DiBella before dumping him having agreed a deal with Don King, contingent on him arranging a bout with Trinidad. With Trinidad's comeback being delayed, Wright opted to continue with the Mosley rematch, promoted by Gary Shaw. DiBella expressed his displeasure with the situation saying "Winky misled me. He misled others, and the situation became a mess and looked like it could deteriorate into a further mess, it's a no-win situation."

Wright would admit that he was less excited to face Mosley again saying "I'm excited for the rematch, I ain't as excited. The first time it was the first real big fight for me. Now, did it and it's just another fight that I got to win."

Since the previously fight Mosley had parted company with his father Jack as his trainer and had hired Joe Goossen.

Wright was a 13 to 5 favourite.

== The fight ==
The first few rounds would see the same pattern of the previous bout with Wright dominating with right jabs and solid left hand shots, preventing any significant body punches from Mosley landing. In the 5th round Wright would appear much more aggressive giving Mosley the opportunity to land two hard punches to the head that appeared to slow the champion. While Wright would regain the momentum, Mosley was able to land to the body more often than he had before.

The bout would go the full 12 rounds, judge Hubert Earle scored it 114–114, while both Duane Ford and Tom Kazmarek both scored it 115–113 in favour of Wright, giving him a majority decision victory.

HBO's unofficial scorer Harold Lederman scored the bout 117–111 and the Associated Press 116–112 both for Wright.

== Aftermath ==
Speaking after the bout Wright said "He was a great fighter. I caught him with more shots. He deserved the rematch, though. He came to fight." He would call for a big money against one of the other top pound for pound fighters "Tito's No. 1, but I'll fight Oscar, Bernard Hopkins, whoever the fans want."

== Undercard ==
Confirmed bouts:

Winner	Loser	Weight division/title belt(s) disputed	Result
Preliminary bouts
(Canada) Ian Gardner	(Canada) Tokunbo Olajide	NABO and NABC Light middleweight title	Majority decision
Non-TV bouts
(United States) José Celaya	(United States) Alphonso Williams	Light middleweight (8 rounds)	3rd-round TKO
(Puerto Rico) Carlos De Leon Jr	(United States) James McCallister	Super middleweight (6 rounds)	Majority decision
(United States) Henry Buchanan	(United States) William Harmon	Light heavyweight (6 rounds)	1st-round TKO
(United States) Nick Casal	(United States) Jovanni Rubio	Welterweight (4 rounds)	1st-round KO
(Mexico) Daniel Cervantes	(Mexico) Juan Zuniga	Light welterweight (4 rounds)	Unanimous decision
(United States) Ronald Johnson	(United States) Cromwell Gordon	Super middleweight (4 rounds)	4th-round TKO

== Broadcasting ==
Country	Broadcaster
Australia	Main Event
Canada	Viewers Choice
Hungary	Sport 1
United Kingdom	BBC
United States	HBO

Preceded by First bout	Winky Wright's bouts 20 November 2004	Succeeded by vs. Félix Trinidad
Preceded by First bout	Shane Mosley's bouts 20 November 2004	Succeeded by vs. David Estrada
