= Olugbala =

Olugbala is both a surname and a middle name. Notable people with the name include:

- Mutulu Olugbala (born 1975), American rapper
- Assata Olugbala Shakur (1947–2025), American activist and murderer
- Tokunbo Olugbala Olajide (born 1976), Canadian boxer
