= Oscar De La Hoya vs. Shane Mosley =

Boxing match

Destiny
- Date: June 17, 2000
- Venue: Staples Center, Los Angeles, California, U.S.
- Title(s) on the line: WBC and IBA welterweight titles

Tale of the tape
Boxer	Oscar De La Hoya	Shane Mosley
Nickname	The Golden Boy	Sugar
Hometown	East Los Angeles, California, U.S.	Pomona, California, U.S.
Purse	$15,000,000	$4,500,000
Pre-fight record	32–1 (26 KO)	34–0 (32 KO)
Age	27 years, 4 months	28 years, 9 months
Height	5 ft 10 in (178 cm)	5 ft 9 in (175 cm)
Weight	146 1/2 lb (66 kg)	147 lb (67 kg)
Style	Orthodox	Orthodox
Recognition	WBC and IBA; Welterweight champion The Ring No. 3 ranked pound-for-pound fighter 4-division world champion	WBC; No. 1 Ranked Welterweight; The Ring No. 5 ranked pound-for-pound fighter Former lightweight world champion

Result
- Mosley wins via 12–round split decision (116–112, 113–115, 115–113)

Oscar De La Hoya vs. Shane Mosley, billed as Destiny, was a professional boxing match contested on June 17, 2000 for the WBC and IBA welterweight titles.

== Background ==
The previous year, De La Hoya had lost the WBC welterweight title to Félix Trinidad. De La Hoya's first loss as a professional was met with controversy, as De La Hoya seemed to be in control for most of the fight's first eight rounds. However, at the urging of his corner, De La Hoya took a more defensive approach in the later rounds, leading to Trinidad taking all of the final four rounds on the scorecards and a majority decision victory. De La Hoya demanded a rematch, but an agreement was never reached. Instead, De La Hoya took an "eliminator" bout with Derrell Coley, who was the number one ranked welterweight fighter by the WBC. The winner was originally set to become the mandatory challenger to Trinidad, but the winner was all but guaranteed to become the new WBC welterweight champion as Trinidad was on the verge of vacating the title in order to move up to the middleweight division and challenge David Reid.

De La Hoya defeated Coley by seventh–round knockout to capture the lightly regarded IBA welterweight title, and shortly after, was once again named the WBC welterweight champion. With De La Hoya and Trinidad unable to come to terms on a rematch, De La Hoya instead reached an agreement in March 2000 to face Shane Mosley in June. Mosley was undefeated in 34 professional bouts and had previously fought in the lightweight division where he had been the IBF champion from 1997 to 1999 before relinquishing the title in September 1999 to move up to welterweight. At the time of his fight with De La Hoya, Mosley had only two welterweight fights to his credit, and as such, came into the fight as a 2–1 betting underdog. Nevertheless, Mosley was guaranteed no less than $4.5 million, the highest purse of his career at the time, whereas De La Hoya was set to earn $15 million.

== The fight ==
De La Hoya had a slight edge during some of the bout's early rounds, but as the fight went to the later rounds, De La Hoya seemed to tire and the fight began to turn in Mosley's favor. Mosley rallied to take rounds seven through 12 on one of the scorecards and five of the last six on the other, often scoring punches in flurries to win those rounds, which proved to be the difference in the fight.

In a closely contested fight, Mosley would earn a narrow split decision victory to become only the sixth fighter (at the time) to win titles in both the lightweight and welterweight divisions. Two judges scored the fight for Mosley with scores of 116–112 and 115–113, while the third had De La Hoya the winner with a score of 115–113. HBO's unofficial scorer Harold Lederman also ruled in favor of Mosley with a score of 116–112.

The final punch stats were close, though Mosley had the overall edge, landing 284 of 678 thrown punches (42%) as opposed to De La Hoya's 257 of 718 (36%). Mosley also outlanded De La Hoya in both jabs and power punches. Mosley was able to land well over half his power punches, landing 174 of 304 for a 57% success rate. De La Hoya was only nine power punches short of Mosley, having landed 165, but at only a 37% success rate.

== Aftermath ==
Like his fight against Trinidad, De La Hoya felt that he had won the fight and called for a rematch in his post-fight interview. However, De La Hoya was so disenchanted with the loss that he even considered retirement. De La Hoya would not fight for the remainder of 2000, eventually returning to defeat Arturo Gatti in March 2001.

Mosley would successfully defend the welterweight title three times against three unheralded opponents before losing the title to Vernon Forrest in January 2002. After unsuccessfully challenging Forrest in a bid to regain the welterweight title, Mosley finally began talks with De La Hoya for the long–awaited rematch. After months of negotiations, the two fighters finally came to an agreement in March 2003 to face one another on September 13, 2003.

== Undercard ==
Confirmed bouts:

Winner	Loser	Weight division/title belt(s) disputed	Result
(United States) Diego Corrales	(Uganda) Justin Juuko	IBA World Super featherweight (12 rounds)	10th round KO
(Mexico) Erik Morales	(United States) Mike Juarez	Featherweight (10 rounds)	3rd round KO
(Australia) Shannan Taylor	(Cayman Islands) Charles Whittaker	Light middleweight (10 rounds)	Unanimous decision
Preliminary bouts
(United States) Mia St. John	(United States) Linda Robinson	Super featherweight (6 rounds)	Unanimous decision
(United States) Eric Esch	(United States) Kerry Biles	Heavyweight (4 rounds)	2nd round KO

== Broadcasting ==
Country	Broadcaster
Australia	Main Event
United States	HBO

Preceded by vs. Derrell Coley	Oscar De La Hoya's bouts 17 June 2000	Succeeded by vs. Arturo Gatti
Preceded by vs. Willy Wise	Shane Mosley's bouts 17 June 2000	Succeeded by vs. Antonio Díaz
Awards
Previous: The IBF indictments	The Ring Event of the Year; 2000	Next: Middleweight World Championship Series
