= Antonio Margarito vs. Shane Mosley =

Boxing match

It's On
- Date: January 24, 2009
- Venue: Staples Center, Los Angeles, California, U.S.
- Title on the line: WBA welterweight title

Tale of the tape
Boxer	Antonio Margarito	Shane Mosley
Nickname	The Tijuana Tornado	Sugar
Hometown	Tijuana, Mexico	Pomona, California, U.S.
Purse	$2,400,000	$2,400,000
Pre-fight record	37–5 (27 KO)	45–5 (1) (38 KO)
Age	30 years, 10 months	37 years, 4 months
Height	5 ft 11 in (180 cm)	5 ft 9 in (175 cm)
Weight	145 3/4 lb (66 kg)	147 lb (67 kg)
Style	Orthodox	Orthodox
Recognition	WBA; Welterweight Champion; The Ring; No. 1 Ranked Welterweight; The Ring No. 6 ranked pound-for-pound fighter	WBA; No. 4 Ranked Welterweight; The Ring; No. 3 Ranked Welterweight; 3-division world champion

Result
- Mosley wins via ninth-round technical knockout

Antonio Margarito vs. Shane Mosley, billed as It's On, was a professional boxing match contested on January 24, 2009, for the WBA and vacant Lineal welterweight championship.

== Background ==
Following his upset victory over WBA welterweight champion Miguel Cotto in July 2008, Antonio Margarito's promoter Top Rank were planning for a summer rematch with a potential interim fight in between. In autumn 2008 a deal was agreed with Golden Boy Promotions for Margarito to face former 3 weight champion Shane Mosley on 24 January 2009, with $2 million for each man on the table. However, on 18 November, Margarito's managers informed Top Rank that they were passing on the fight, instead looking for a more lucrative bout. Golden Boy CEO Richard Schaefer expressed his displeasure saying "Margarito talked and talked and talked and as soon as Shane accepted, he was all of a sudden very quiet, and now he doesn't want the fight. Margarito always says he's the most feared fighter in the world. He should shut up about that now." He added that he would now focus on making a match for Mosley with WBC champion Andre Berto instead. However, after the proposed Berto vs Mosley bout also hit trouble, HBO reached a deal with Top Rank where an undisclosed additional payment was made directly to them and to Margarito, allowing the bout to be formally agreed on 24 January as part HBO World Championship Boxing.

At the 9 December press conference, Margarito told the reporters "I have being looking for the biggest fights for a long time, and this one against Mosley is one of them. As I proved with Miguel Cotto, I have never ducked anyone in my career and I'm looking forward to showing the fans again why I am the best welterweight in the world. I fear no one. This fight will be my moment to shine and I will not let it pass by." Mosley meanwhile said "I'm glad Margarito decided to step up to the plate and fight me. If Margarito thinks he is the bigger puncher than I, he is delusional. I will definitely win this fight, especially with the type of fighter he is. He is going to end up getting knocked out because he'll come right at me and I'll catch him."

Mosley's build up to the bout had been hit by multiple issues, firstly he had fired his father as his trainer (for the second time), he was still dealing with the legal issues surrounding his involvement in the BALCO scandal and he had separated with his wife (and now former manager) Jin.

Mosley, was a 4–1 underdog with the bookies.

=== Tampered handwraps controversy ===
Shortly before the bout, Mosley's trainer, Naazim Richardson, observed that Margarito had a pasty white substance in his handwraps. One doctor described this material as plaster hidden in the wrapped hands of Margarito, leading to accusations that he may have been trying to cheat. At Richardson's insistence, California State Inspector Dean Lohuis called for Margarito's hands to be rewrapped. According to Judd Burstein, the attorney for Mosley, Margarito had wet pads in the wrapping. Mosley's doctor, Robert Olvera, likened the material to the type of plaster used to make casts. Burstein said he seized the pad removed from the wrapping and another pad found in Margarito's dressing room. Both were placed in a sealed box that was given to Lohuis for further study. The California Department of Justice laboratory later confirmed the substance to be similar in nature to plaster of Paris.

== The fight ==
In front of the largest crowd to ever see an event at the Staples Center, 20,820, Mosley dominated Margarito, using his superior hand speed, pinpoint accuracy, consistent body punching, countless huge right hands to the jaw and tying up when Margarito backed him into the ropes, to wear Margarito down and stop him. After knocking him down with a series of heavy overhand rights at the end of the eighth round, Margarito was unable to avoid punches during a heavy barrage from Mosley early on in the ninth, forcing the referee to step in as Margarito slumped to the canvas a second time, giving Mosley a first world title in almost 5 years (and his first at welterweight since 2002). Margarito had never previously been stopped.

At the time of the stoppage Mosley led on all three scorecards 80–71, 79–72 & 78–73. HBO's unofficial ringside scorer Harold Lederman as well as the Associated Press had scored it 79–72 and ESPN's Dan Rafael had it 80–71, all for Mosley.

== Aftermath ==
Speaking after bout, Mosley said "It was my strategy, my focus and my game-plan that won it. I knew it was going to be a tough fight but it was a great plan. It was my left hook. I caught Vargas with it and Mayorga with it. He's a very tough fighter and he had a lot of endurance. I prepared very hard. I trained hard so I was focused and I was always alert during the fight. He was very powerful but he couldn't resist my rhythm." A dejected Margarito said simply "I feel OK. I was just getting caught over and over." His trainer Javier Capetillo expanded "Something happened in the first round. We were too slow. I didn't think he was reacting properly. It was frustrating to watch because he kept getting caught with overhand rights."

In late January the California State Athletic Commission suspended Margarito and Capetillo, pending investigation. At the hearing, Margarito claimed he did not know what was in the wraps, while Capetillo admitted to making "a big mistake" by placing the wrong inserts into Margarito's hand wraps. The commission voted unanimously to revoke Margarito and Capetillo's licenses for at least one year. While it found Margarito did not know about the gloves, it took the line that as head of the team, he was responsible for Capetillo's actions.

Since state boxing commissions generally honor suspensions imposed in other states, this action effectively banned Margarito from boxing in the United States.

In November 2009, it emerged that red stains on the hand wraps Margarito used in the Cotto fight were similar to the stains on the inserts seized before the Mosley fight. This has raised suspicions that Margarito's gloves were loaded for that fight and possibly others as well.

== Undercard ==
Confirmed bouts:

Winner	Loser	Weight division/title belt(s) disputed	Result
(Russia) Matvey Korobov	(Mexico) Roberto Florentino	Super middleweight (4 rounds)	1st-round KO
(United States) Robert Guerrero	(Mexico) Edel Ruiz	Super featherweight (10 rounds)	1st-round TKO
(United States) Adrien Broner	(Mexico) Luis Alfredo Lugo	Lightweight (6 rounds)	Unanimous decision
(Mexico) Saúl Román	(Nicaragua) José Varela	Middleweight (8 rounds)	Split decision
(Mexico) Juan Salgado Zambrano	(Mexico) Cristian Favela	Light welterweight (6 rounds)	Unanimous decision
(United States) Jerry Belmontes	(United States) Jesús Hernández	Super featherweight (4 rounds)	Unanimous decision
(United States) Luis Tapia	(United States) Brian Ramirez	Lightweight (4 rounds)	Unanimous decision

== Broadcasting ==
Country	Broadcaster
Australia	Main Event
Ireland	Setanta Sport
Philippines	Solar Sports
Poland	PolSat Sport Extra
United Kingdom	Setanta Sport
United States	HBO

Preceded by vs. Miguel Cotto	Antonio Margarito's bouts 24 January 2009	Succeeded by vs. Roberto García
Preceded by vs. Ricardo Mayorga	Shane Mosley's bouts 24 January 2009	Succeeded by vs. Floyd Mayweather Jr.
