= English Fisher =

English Wilson "Bouie" Fisher (June 1, 1928 – June 30, 2011) was a boxing coach, who trained Bernard Hopkins for the majority of his career.

== Career ==
Fisher was an amateur and professional boxer who coached Bernard Hopkins from 1989 until their split in 2002 which resulted in Fisher taking Hopkins to court, claiming he was underpaid by $255,000. They re-united in 2003, and split again in 2005, again with Fisher claiming to be underpaid, this time by $200,000. Naazim Richardson, Fisher's long-term assistant, took over as Hopkins' head coach from 2005.

== Awards ==
Fisher won the Eddie Futch-John F.X. Condon Award, awarded by the Boxing Writers Association of America, for Trainer of the Year in 2001.

== Death ==
Bouie died aged 83 in June 2011 following a long illness.

== Sources ==
- http://www.boxingscene.com/bouie-fisher-ex-hopkins-trainer-passes-age-83--40987
- https://www.espn.com/sports/boxing/news/story?id=6726511
- http://www.eastsideboxing.com/Interview-Fisher.html
