= Shane Mosley vs. Antonio Díaz =

Boxing match

- Date: November 4, 2000
- Venue: The Theater at Madison Square Garden, New York, New York, U.S.
- Title(s) on the line: WBC welterweight title

Tale of the tape
Boxer	Shane Mosley	Antonio Díaz
Nickname	Sugar	Toño
Hometown	Pomona, California, U.S.	Coachella, California, U.S.
Purse	$3,000,000	$360,000
Pre-fight record	35–0 (33 KO)	33–2 (22 KO)
Age	29 years, 1 month	24 years, 4 months
Height	5 ft 9 in (175 cm)	5 ft 9 in (175 cm)
Weight	146 1/2 lb (66 kg)	146 1/2 lb (66 kg)
Style	Orthodox	Orthodox
Recognition	WBC; Welterweight Champion; The Ring No. 1 Ranked pound-for-pound fighter 2-division world champion	WBC; No. 15 Ranked Welterweight; IBA; Super Lightweight Champion

Result
- Mosley wins via 6th–round technical knockout

Shane Mosley vs. Antonio Díaz was a professional boxing match contested on November 4, 2000 for the WBC welterweight title.

== Background ==
Shane Mosley had scored the biggest victory in his professional career in his previous fight, earning a narrow, and controversial, split decision victory over Oscar De La Hoya in June 2000. Given the closeness of the contest, interest for an immediate rematch was high, with the both fighters promoters Bob Arum and Cedric Kushner hoping to get a deal done soon after. Mosley himself expressed that he had no qualms with granting De La Hoya a rematch should he want one stating after his victory, "he gave me an opportunity to fight him. If he wants a rematch, I've got to give it to him." However, De La Hoya, disappointed with his loss, had little interest in an immediate rematch and claimed that he would "rethink my whole game plan in life" and mulled retirement. De La Hoya would ultimately not fight for the remainder of 2001, ending any hopes for a planned November 2000 rematch with Mosley.

Unable to secure a rematch with De La Hoya, Kushner instead arranged for Mosley to make his first welterweight title defense against little known Antonio Díaz on November 4, 2000, at The Theater at Madison Square Garden. Díaz, who had held the fringe IBA super lightweight title December 1997, was fighting for a major world title for the first time.

== Fight Details ==
Mosley controlled the fight from the first round on and had little difficulty with the overmatched Díaz. Mosley scored an early knockdown, sending Díaz down for the first time in his professional career after landing consecutive right hands with just over a minute left in the second round, though Díaz was able to get back to his feet quickly. Díaz, knowing that Mosley had built an early lead, fought more aggressively in the third, but Mosley effectively used his quickness and counter-punching and landed the bigger punches in the round. Mosley maintained control of the fight into the sixth round when he scored another knockdown early in the round with Díaz again answering the referee's 10-count. Sensing the end was near, Mosley went on the offensive against the clearly exhausted Díaz and battered him with a flurry of punches until sending him down again with another big right hand. Feeling that Díaz could no longer continue, referee Arthur Mercante Sr. immediately halted the fight, giving Mosley the victory by technical knockout at 1:36 of the round.

== Fight card ==
Confirmed bouts:

Weight Class	Weight		vs.		Method	Round	Notes
Welterweight	147 lbs.	Shane Mosley	def.	Antonio Díaz	TKO	6/12	^{note 1}
Super Lightweight	140 lbs.	Héctor Camacho Jr.	def.	Joe Hutchinson	UD	10/10
Heavyweight	200+ lbs.	Danell Nicholson	def.	Reynaldo Minus	TKO	2/10
Heavyweight	200+ lbs.	Derrick Jefferson	def.	Marcus Johnson	TKO	1/8
Heavyweight	200+ lbs.	LeRoy Berbick	def.	Ed Hardy	TKO	3/6
Super Middleweight	160 lbs.	Tokunbo Olajide	def.	Brad Ekstam	KO	1/4

^Note 1 For WBC Welterweight Title

== Broadcasting ==
Country	Broadcaster
United States	HBO

Preceded by vs. Oscar De La Hoya	Shane Mosley's bouts 4 November 2000	Succeeded by vs. Shannan Taylor
Preceded by vs. Micky Ward	Antonio Díaz's bouts 4 November 2000	Succeeded by vs. Gilbert Quiros
