= Karl Dargan =

American boxer

Personal information
- Full name: Karl Sharif Dargan
- Nickname: Dynamite
- Nationality: American
- Born: June 17, 1985 (age 41) Philadelphia, Pennsylvania
- Height: 1.75 m (5 ft 9 in)
- Weight: 65 kg (143 lb)

Sport
- Sport: Boxing
- Weight class: Lightweight
- Club: James Shuler Memorial Gym
Medal record
Pan American Games
Gold medal – first place	2007 Rio de Janeiro	Light Welterweight

Karl Sharif Dargan (born June 17, 1985) is an American boxer. Nicknamed "The Dynamite", Dargan is best known for winning the gold medal at the 2007 Pan Am Games in the Men's Light Welterweight.

== Career ==
=== Amateur ===
Dargan began boxing at age seven in 1992 and won the PAL tournament 2005 at 125 lbs, at the National Golden Gloves 2002 on points to Lorenzo Reynolds in the finals and had to settle for 2nd. In 2005, Dargan became US champion but lost twice to Anthony Peterson at the Olympic team trials. In 2007, Dargan was upset by young Javier Molina at the US championships but rebounded to win the Pan American Games in Rio de Janeiro against local Myke Carvalho in the semi and Jonathan Gonzalez of Puerto Rico in the light welterweight final at the Riocentro Sports Complex (9:4). After failing to qualify for the 2008 Olympic Trials, Dargan finished his career as an amateur, and turned professional.

=== World Amateur Championship ===
2005

- Defeated Carl Heild (Bahamas) RSCO
- Lost to Serik Sapiyev (Kazakhstan) 26–37

=== Pro ===
Dargan made his pro debut in 2007 and is 19–1 as of November 2018. Dargan was being trained by his uncle, Naazim Richardson.

== Personal life ==
In October 2014, Dargan married American singer Lil' Mo (whose real name is Cynthia Loving). Dargan appeared occasionally alongside Loving on the reality television show R&B Divas: Los Angeles during the show's second and third seasons in 2014 and 2015. The couple had a child, a son Karl Dargan Jr. on August 28, 2015. Since October 2017, Dargan has appeared as a supporting cast member on the reality television show Love & Hip Hop: New York. In November 2017, Dargan and Loving appeared on Couples Court with the Cutlers. In May 2019, Mo announced that she had left Karl, after he had spat on her in front of their children during an argument. Mo revealed in later interviews that he had been physically abusive throughout their marriage. Their divorce was finalized in April 2021.
