= Ian Gardner =

Canadian boxer

Ian Gardner (born May 5, 1981), nicknamed The Cobra for his slithering movements in the boxing ring, is a Canadian former professional boxer who was born and raised in Saint John, New Brunswick, Canada. In 2001, he moved to the United States to train under Goody Petronelli in Brockton Massachusetts. He primarily fought at middleweight, but also fought once at junior middleweight against Tokunbo Olajide for the vacant NABO and NABC junior middleweight titles in 2004, winning the bout by majority decision. Gardner would then face future middleweight and super-middleweight champion Arthur Abraham in 2005 for the vacant WBA Inter-Continental middleweight title, losing by a 12-round decision. He later fought future light heavyweight champion Chad Dawson for the vacant NABO super middleweight title in the same year, losing by TKO in round 11.

Gardner is one of just six men who have gone the distance with future WBA, WBC, IBF, and IBO middleweight champion Gennadiy Golovkin, dropping an 8-round decision in 2008. He fought once more and defeated Marcus Thomas by KO in 2009, retiring afterwards.

== Professional boxing record ==
25 fights	21 wins	4 losses
By knockout	9	1
By decision	12	3

No.	Result	Record	Opponent	Type	Round, time	Date	Location	Notes
25	Win	21–4	(Barbados) Marcus Thomas	KO	4 (8), 1:58	2009-05-30	Palooka’s Boxing Club, Halifax, Nova Scotia, Canada	
24	Loss	20–4	(Kazakhstan) Gennady Golovkin	UD	8	2008-04-05	Burg-Wächter Castello, Düsseldorf, Germany	
23	Win	20–3	(United States) Deandre Latimore	KO	3 (8), 2:50	2007-01-25	Ameristar Casino, St. Charles, Missouri, United States	
22	Loss	19–3	(United States) Chad Dawson	TKO	11 (12), 1:12	2005-11-18	Athletic Center, New Haven, Connecticut, United States	For vacant WBO-NABO super middleweight title.
21	Win	19–2	(Brazil) Mohamad Abdallah Said Salem	UD	10	2005-07-05	The Roxy, Boston, Massachusetts, United States	
20	Loss	18–2	(Germany) Arthur Abraham	UD	12	2005-02-12	Max-Schmeling-Halle, Berlin, Germany	For vacant WBA Inter-Continental middleweight title.
19	Win	18–1	(Canada) Tokunbo Olajide	MD	12	Nov 20, 2004	Mandalay Bay Resort & Casino, Las Vegas, Nevada, United States	Won vacant WBO-NABO super welterweight and vacant NABC light middleweight titles.
18	Win	17–1	(Uzbekistan) Kuvonchbek Toygonbaev	SD	10	2004-09-02	Harrah's Hotel, Kansas City, Missouri, United States	
17	Win	16–1	(United States) Patrick Perez	UD	10	2004-06-25	The Roxy, Boston, Massachusetts, United States	Won vacant WBC Mundo Hispano middleweight title.
16	Win	15–1	(Kenya) Joshua Onyango	UD	8	2003-12-04	The Roxy, Boston, Massachusetts, United States	
15	Win	14–1	(United States) Dave Hadden	UD	8	2003-08-09	The Fairgrounds, Brockton, Massachusetts, United States	
14	Win	13–1	(United States) Dhafir Smith	UD	8	2003-06-20	First Union Spectrum, Philadelphia, Pennsylvania, United States	
13	Win	12–1	(United States) Aundalen Sloan	TKO	8 (8)	2003-06-13	Wonderland Ballroom, Revere, Massachusetts, United States	
12	Win	11–1	(United States) Mike McFail	TKO	6 (8)	2003-04-26	Shaw's Convention Center, Brockton, Massachusetts, United States	
11	Win	10–1	(Brazil) Luiz Augusto Dos Santos	UD	8	2003-03-20	Michael's Eighth Avenue, Glen Burnie, Maryland, United States	
10	Win	9–1	(United States) Joe Lorenzi	TKO	2 (6)	2003-03-17	The Roxy, Boston, Massachusetts, United States	
9	Win	8–1	(United States) James McCallister	KO	2 (8), 2:25	2003-01-16	Michael's Eighth Avenue, Glen Burnie, Maryland, United States	
8	Win	7–1	(United States) Michael Corleone	TKO	3 (6)	2002-11-23	Matrix Entertainment Complex, Taunton, Massachusetts, United States	
7	Win	6–1	(Canada) Keith Sonley	TKO	3 (6), 1:35	2002-10-25	Wonderland Ballroom, Revere, Massachusetts, United States	
6	Win	5–1	(The Bahamas) Kenny Stubbs	TKO	3 (6)	2002-08-30	Roseland Ballroom, New York City, New York, United States	
5	Win	4–1	(United States) Gilberto Reyes	SD	4	2002-07-12	Hampton Beach Casino Ballroom, Hampton Beach, New Hampshire, United States	
4	Win	3–1	(Democratic Republic of the Congo) Pierre Moke Kulewa	UD	4	2001-11-29	Halifax Metro Centre, Halifax, Nova Scotia, Canada	
3	Loss	2–1	(United States) Peter Manfredo Jr.	SD	4	2001-11-02	Foxwoods Resort Casino, Ledyard, Connecticut, United States	
2	Win	2–0	(United States) Troy Rowland	SD	4	May 26, 2001	Van Andel Arena, Grand Rapids, Michigan, United States	
1	Win	1–0	(United States) Tommy Huff	UD	4	2001-04-27	Civic Center, Niagara Falls, New York, United States	Professional debut.
