= Shane Mosley vs. Winky Wright =

Boxing match

War at 154
- Date: March 13, 2004
- Venue: Mandalay Bay Events Center, Paradise, Nevada, U.S.
- Title(s) on the line: WBA, WBC, IBF and The Ring undisputed light middleweight titles

Tale of the tape
Boxer	Shane Mosley	Ronald Wright
Nickname	Sugar	Winky
Hometown	Pomona, California, U.S.	Washington, D.C., U.S.
Purse	$2,100,000	$750,000
Pre-fight record	39–2 (1) (35 KO)	46–3 (25 KO)
Age	32 years, 6 months	32 years, 3 months
Height	5 ft 9 in (175 cm)	5 ft 10 in (178 cm)
Weight	154 lb (70 kg)	154 lb (70 kg)
Style	Orthodox	Southpaw
Recognition	WBA, WBC and The Ring; Light Middleweight Champion; The Ring pound-for-pound No. 3 ranked fighter 3-division world champion	IBF; Light Middleweight Champion; The Ring; No. 2 Ranked Light Middleweight

Result
- Wright wins by unanimous decision (117–111, 117–111, 116–112)

Shane Mosley vs. Winky Wright, billed as War at 154, was a professional boxing match contested on March 13, 2004, for the undisputed light middleweight championship.

== Background ==
After his controversial decision victory in his rematch with Oscar De La Hoya, to win the WBA, WBC, The Ring and lineal light middleweight titles, Shane Mosley agreed a $7 million deal to face Ricardo Mayorga. However, on December 13, Mayorga lost a majority decision to Cory Spinks. He also turned down an offer for a third bout with De La Hoya over the purse split.

Instead Mosley agreed to face IBF champion Ronald "Winky" Wright for the undisputed 154 pound title (in only his third bout at the weight), with the prospect of a $10 million fight against former 3-division champion Félix Trinidad in September if he should beat Wright, with Mosley quoted as saying "I promised myself and my fans that from now on, I would only take career-defining fights. I consider that promise a solemn vow. Winky Wright is for boxing history and personal history. Felix Trinidad is for immortality."

In late 2003 Mosley was subpoenaed by the grand jury investigating the BALCO scandal.

Wright, who had spent his whole career at light middleweight, had won a major world title at the third attempt in October 2001, scoring a unanimous decision over Robert Frazier, having lost to Julio César Vásquez in 1994 and a controversial majority decision defeat to Fernando Vargas in 1999. He had earned a reputation as an unglamorous trickery fighter who presented as a high risk, low reward option that had prevented him from getting the big fights and had meant that he had been forced earlier in his career to travel to Europe to fight. His tricky style and globetrotting career had earned him the nickname "International Man of Misery".

Wright was a 5-to-2 underdog.

== The fight ==
In a fast-paced bout, Mosley was unable to get on the inside of Wright's right jab. The southpaw Wright made it difficult throwing jabs and straight left to both the face and body. Wright consistently beat Mosley to the punch and outfought him. Sensing he was behind, Mosley came out firing for the final round, but Wright fought back just as hard up to the final bell.

At the end of 12 rounds, Judges Dave Moretti and Chuck Giampa scored it 117–111, while Paul Smith had it 116–112 all in favor of Wright.

HBO's unofficial scorer Harold Lederman scored the bout 117–111 for Wright.

According to CompuBox Wright outlanded Mosley, landing with 250 of 761 punches thrown (33% connect rate) to 166 of 618 (27% connect rate) from Mosley.

== Aftermath ==
Speaking after the bout Wright said "[Mosley's] fast but I tried to keep him away with the jab, and it worked. He's a very strong fighter but I got my chance and I proved it. If everybody wants it, we can do it again. It's been a long time. I always felt I was better. Shane has speed but I was better all around"

Mosley defend his decision to take the fight and risking the big payday against Trinidad saying "It was not a mistake. I have no regrets. I wanted to find out who was the best in our division. I was fighting for history." He also said he felt weaken in the ring saying "For some reason when I came into the ring I felt like I was dehydrated. I couldn't move. It was a monkey on my back." Mosley graciously claimed that Wright was now one of the best fighters in the world saying "It's not just Sugar Shane, De la Hoya and Trinidad anymore. Now we have Winky Wright."

Mosley's promoter Gary Shaw confirmed that they planned to exercise the rematch cause in the contract.

Just over a month after the bout Wright was stripped of the IBF title after refusing to fight mandatory challenger Kassim Ouma and instead accepting a rematch with Mosley. The light middleweight division would remain split until 2022.

== Undercard ==
Confirmed bouts:

Winner	Loser	Weight division/title belt(s) disputed	Result
(United States) Joe Mesi	(Kazakhstan) Vassiliy Jirov	Heavyweight (10 rounds)	Unanimous decision
Non-TV bouts
(United States) José Celaya	(United States) Richard Hall	Light middleweight (8 rounds)	1st-round KO
(United States) Carl Daniels	(United States) Rico Cason	Super middleweight (8 rounds)	2nd-round TKO
(Canada) Vaia Zaganas	(Japan) Yumi Takano	Strawweight (6 rounds)	Majority Decision
(Kyrgyzstan) Almazbek Raiymkulov	(Mexico) Luis Alfonso Lizarraga	Light welterweight (6 rounds)	Unanimous decision
(Canada) Conal MacPhee	(United States) Rodney Moore	Cruiserweight (6 rounds)	2nd-round TKO.
(Puerto Rico) Mario Santiago	(Mexico) Luis Alfonso De La Rosa	Featherweight (4 rounds)	Unanimous decision

== Broadcasting ==
Country	Broadcaster
Australia	Main Event
Hungary	Sport 1
United Kingdom	Sky Sports
United States	HBO

Preceded by vs. Oscar De La Hoya II	Shane Mosley's bouts 13 March 2004	Succeeded by Rematch
Preceded by vs. Ángel Hernández	Winky Wright's bouts 13 March 2004	Succeeded by Rematch
