= Tokunbo Olajide =

Canadian boxer

Tokunbo Olugbala Olajide (born December 5, 1976, in Vancouver, British Columbia) is a Canadian retired Light Middleweight boxer. He is of Nigerian descent.

He has a record of 20 wins with 17 knockouts and only 2 losses.

His brother is former Super Middleweight boxer Michael Olajide.

== Professional boxing record ==
22 fights	20 wins	2 losses
By knockout	17	1
By decision	3	1

No.	Result	Record	Opponent	Type	Round, time	Date	Location	Notes
22	Loss	20–2	(Canada) Ian Gardner	MD	12	Nov 20, 2004	Mandalay Bay Resort & Casino, Las Vegas, Nevada, United States	For vacant WBO-NABO super welterweight and vacant NABC light middleweight titles.
21	Win	20–1	(United States) Larry Marks	TKO	2 (12), 1:39	2004-02-20	(United States) Ballys Park Place Hotel Casino, Atlantic City, New Jersey, USA	Won vacant IBF-USBA super welterweight title.
20	Win	19–1	(Azerbaijan) Emil Baku	TKO	4 (10)	2003-09-16	(United States) Civic Center, Lake Charles, Louisiana, USA	
19	Win	18–1	(Mexico) Jesus Felipe Valverde	UD	10	2003-05-23	(United States) Orleans Hotel & Casino, Las Vegas, Nevada, USA	
18	Loss	17–1	(Colombia) Epifanio Mendoza	TKO	1 (10), 0:30	2002-10-13	(United States) Regent Hotel, New York City, New York, USA	
17	Win	17–0	(United States) Gary Jones	TKO	5 (10), 2:48	2002-08-09	(United States) Tropicana Hotel & Casino, Atlantic City, New Jersey, USA	
16	Win	16–0	(Canada) Trevor Brown	KO	4 (8), 1:17	2002-03-15	(United States) Cipriani's Restaurant, New York City, New York, USA	
15	Win	15–0	(The Bahamas) Marvin Smith	KO	2 (6)	26 Jan 2002	(United States) Madison Square Garden, New York City, New York, USA	
14	Win	14–0	(United States) Richard Karsten	TKO	4 (8), 2:29	2001-11-16	(United States) Orleans Hotel & Casino, Las Vegas, Nevada, USA	
13	Win	13–0	(United States Virgin Islands) Leroy Brooks	RTD	3 (6), 3:00	2001-07-21	(United States) Caesars Palace, Las Vegas, Nevada, USA	
12	Win	12–0	(United States) Elvis Alexander	TKO	3 (6)	2001-06-16	(United States) Aqueduct Racetrack, Queens, New York, USA	
11	Win	11–0	(United States) Leo Edwards	TKO	3 (6), 1:08	2001-05-18	(United States) Foxwoods Resort Casino, Ledyard, Connecticut, USA	
10	Win	10–0	(United States) Brad Ekstam	KO	1 (6)	4 Nov 2000	(United States) Madison Square Garden, New York City, New York, USA	
9	Win	9–0	(Cameroon) Bertrand Tchandjeu	KO	6 (6)	2000-09-22	(United States) Club Amazura, Queens, New York, USA	
8	Win	8–0	(United States) Kevin Tillman	PTS	4	2000-07-14	(United States) Hampton Beach Casino Ballroom, Hampton Beach, New Hampshire, USA	
7	Win	7–0	(United States) Carl Cockerham	KO	5 (6), 0:26	2000-02-18	(United States) Orleans Hotel & Casino, Las Vegas, Nevada, USA	
6	Win	6–0	(Germany) Predrag Cvetanovic	KO	1 (4)	1999-11-06	(United States) Convention Hall, Atlantic City, New Jersey, USA	
5	Win	5–0	(Puerto Rico) Luis Rodriguez	KO	2 (6), 2:40	1999-07-30	(United States) Foxwoods Resort Casino, Ledyard, Connecticut, USA	
4	Win	4–0	(United States) Horatio Pitmon	KO	2 (4)	1999-06-03	(United States) Genetti Manor, Dickson City, Pennsylvania, USA	
3	Win	3–0	(United States) Lawrence Frisby	UD	4	1999-02-19	(United States) Capitol Theatre, Port Chester, New York, USA	
2	Win	2–0	(Puerto Rico) Jim Navedo	KO	1 (4), 2:57	1997-08-24	(United States) The Roxy, Boston, Massachusetts, USA	
1	Win	1–0	(United States) Kelly Shaver	KO	3 (4)	1997-06-20	(United States) Ballys Park Place Hotel Casino, Atlantic City, New Jersey, USA	Professional debut.
