= Floyd Mayweather Jr. vs. Shane Mosley =

2010 professional boxing match

Who R U Picking?
- Date: May 1, 2010
- Venue: MGM Grand Garden Arena, Paradise, Nevada, U.S.

Tale of the tape
Boxer	Floyd Mayweather Jr.	Shane Mosley
Nickname	Money	Sugar
Hometown	Grand Rapids, Michigan, U.S.	Pomona, California, U.S.
Purse	$22,500,000	$6,700,000
Pre-fight record	40–0 (25 KO)	46–5 (39 KO)
Age	33 years, 2 months	38 years, 7 months
Height	5 ft 8 in (173 cm)	5 ft 9 in (175 cm)
Weight	146 lb (66 kg)	147 lb (67 kg)
Style	Orthodox	Orthodox
Recognition	WBA/WBC; No. 1 Ranked Welterweight; The Ring; No. 3 Ranked Welterweight; The Ring No. 2 ranked pound-for-pound fighter 5-division world champion	The Ring; No. 2 Ranked Welterweight; The Ring No. 3 ranked pound-for-pound fighter 3-division world champion

Result
- Mayweather Jr. wins via 12-round unanimous decision (119-109, 119-109, 118-110)

Floyd Mayweather Jr. vs. Shane Mosley, billed as Who R U Picking?, was a boxing welterweight non-title superfight, in which Mayweather Jr. won by unanimous decision with two judges scoring it 119–109 and one judge scoring it 118–110. The bout was held on May 1, 2010, before a "sellout" crowd of 15,117 at the MGM Grand Garden Arena in Las Vegas, Nevada, United States. Boxing greats Muhammad Ali and Mike Tyson were among a long list of celebrities in attendance. The match was put together after Andre Berto pulled out of his scheduled January 30 unification bout against Mosley.

== Background ==
Talk about a fight between Mayweather and Mosley went back as far as 1999.

However the first serious talk of fight between the fighters came after Floyd Mayweather's win over Juan Manuel Marquez, when the two fighters confronted each other and started shoving and insulting each other. However following this incident each fighter went his own way, only to meet up again.

Shane Mosley was scheduled to face Andre Berto for a WBC and WBA Welterweight title unification bout on January 30, 2010. However, the fight (and entire undercard) was called off on January 18, 2010, due to an earthquake in Haiti and Berto losing several family members in the disaster. Negotiations for a proposed matchup between Mosley and Floyd Mayweather Jr. immediately began afterwards, ending with both sides agreeing to a set date of May 1, 2010, at the MGM Grand Garden Arena in Las Vegas, Nevada. The fight was billed "Who R U Picking?"

=== Pre-fight hype ===
The earliest pre-fight hype came after Manny Pacquiao's fight with Joshua Clottey on March 13, 2010, when HBO aired a brief interview, confrontational-styled show entitled, "Face Off" with Max Kellerman hosting and leading the conversation.

However the first major pre-fight hype took part when HBO produced a four-part prelude of their show 24/7. The series, titled Mayweather-Mosley 24/7, aired installments all throughout April 2010. The series focused on each fighter's training and preparation for the bout. For Mosley, the fight was very symbolic, and a way to show he is the best boxer in the world. For Mayweather, the fight was seen as just business, and Mosley as just another fighter.

During one installment of Mayweather-Mosley 24/7, Mayweather proclaimed himself the greatest boxer of all time, better than Sugar Ray Robinson and Muhammad Ali, and made light of Mosley's skill.

On the night of the fight one commentator called it "the most highly anticipated welterweight matchup since Sugar Ray Leonard stopped Thomas Hearns in the 14th round in 1981."

=== Drug testing ===
Both Floyd Mayweather Jr. and Shane Mosley agreed to Olympic style drug testing for this fight, which included random sampling of blood and urine. This was the first fight in the United States to undergo these conditions.

This style of drug testing was promoted from Mayweather due to his purported concern of the health of many fighters who face medical problems later in life due to drug use, as well as a way to make clear no cheating, imagined or otherwise, is taking place. Mayweather first proposed this when negotiations with Manny Pacquiao first took place in early 2010; they had both agreed to random urine testing and three blood tests, but Mayweather also demanded additional random blood testing, even though that is not required under the rules of the Nevada State Athletic Commission, and the fight ultimately fell apart.

== The fight ==
Entering the fight, Mayweather was a 1:4 favorite.

Mosley started the match strong, winning only the second round and competitive first round. Round two belonged to Mosley as he hurt then buckled Mayweather's knees with powerful rights. Mayweather appeared to be in trouble for the first time in his career, but stayed on his feet. The close calls inspired the crowd to break into a chant of "Mosley! Mosley! Mosley!" When later asked how he survived the onslaught Mayweather replied, "it's a contact sport, and you're going to get hit. You got to suck it up and keep on fighting."

After the trying second round, Mayweather bounced back with quick, precise punching, and avoided further trouble. He picked up his offense and controlled round three and four with fast combinations and low body jabs. A strong right in the fourth sent Mosley reeling. As the fight progressed, Mosley began to slow down. In the middle rounds, he backed off on offense and Mayweather took advantage by picking up points with non-damaging hits. By the seventh round, Mosley look winded. In the eighth, he became frustrated and received a referee warning after it appeared he tried to toss Mayweather to the ground in a wrestling-style move. By the end of ninth, Mosley had a "look of resignation on his face" as he walked back to his corner.

Mayweather ending up losing only the second round, according to the judges' scorecards, winning the 12 round fight by unanimous decision. Two judges had the final margin at 119–109, while the third had it at 118–108. The win improved Mayweather to 41–0 in his career, while dropping Mosley to 46–6.

== Aftermath ==
After the fight, Mosley said neck tightness inhibited his fight. "I tried to move around, but he was too quick and I was too tight ... I thought I had to knock him out [early]". "I couldn't adjust and he did", Mosley added. Mayweather remarked, "I came here tonight to give the fans what they wanted to see: a toe-to-toe battle. It wasn't the same style, but I wanted to be aggressive and I knew I could do it." He said he was ready to take on Manny Pacquiao, if he "wants to fight" and "will take the blood and urine tests".

== Fight earnings ==
Starting around May 10 many reports stated that the official number of PPV buys for the fight was 1.4 million. This is mostly according from Leonard Ellerbe, the advisor for Floyd Mayweather and an inside source on the topic.

On May 11, HBO officially released that the fight generated $78.3 million in revenue.

According to initial inside sources the PPV buyrate was expected to be around 1.1 to 1.5 million. buys. With Richard Schaefer, the CEO of Golden Boy Promotions, who sponsored the fight saying he first thought that the buyrate would be around 3.5 to 4 million.

Mayweather received a guaranteed $22.5 Million for the fight, plus a bonus for PPV subscriptions which later amounted to around $40 million, while Mosley got $6.7 million.

== Undercard ==
Confirmed bouts:

=== Televised ===
- Super Welterweight bout: (Mexico) Canelo Álvarez def. (Puerto Rico) Jose Miguel Cotto (TKO, 9th round referee stoppage)

Álvarez defeated Cotto via technical knockout in the ninth round.

- Featherweight bout: (Mexico) Daniel Ponce de León def. (United States) Cornelius Lock (unanimous decision)

Ponce de Leon defeated Lock via unanimous decision (96–94, 97–93, 96–94). The fight was a title defense for Ponce de Leon's, WBC Latino Featherweight title.

- Welterweight bout: (Morocco) Said Ouali def. (Argentina) Hector Saldivia (TKO, 1st round referee stoppage)

Ouali defeated Saldivia via technical knockout in the first round. The fight was a WBA Welterweight title eliminator.

=== Untelevised ===
- Super Featherweight bout: (United States) Eloy Perez def. (Mexico) Gilberto Sanchez Leon (majority decision)

Perez defeated Leon via majority decision (95–95, 97–93, 96–94). The fight was a title defense for Perez's WBO NABO Super Featherweight title.

- Light Welterweight bout: (Mexico) Jesse Vargas def. (Mexico) Arturo Morua (TKO, 6th round referee stoppage)

Vargas defeated Morua via technical knockout in the sixth round.

- Lightweight bout: (United States) Luis Ramos Jr. def. (United States) Allen Litzau (TKO, 2nd round referee stoppage)

Ramos Jr. defeated Litzau via technical knockout in the second round.

- Middleweight bout: (United States) Dion Savage def. (United States) Tommie Speller (unanimous decision)

Savage defeated Speller via unanimous decision (80–72, 80–72, 80–72).

- Light Welterweight: (United States) Daniel Reece def. (United States) Nichoulas Briannes (unanimous decision)

Reece defeated Briannes via unanimous decision.

== International broadcasting ==
Country	Broadcaster
Albania	SuperSport 1
Argentina	TyC Sports
Australia	Main Event
Brazil	SporTV
Canada	Viewers Choice
Chile	ESPN+
Czech Republic	Sport 1
Denmark	TV2 Sport
Fiji	Sky Pacific
France	Canal+
Germany	Sky Sport 1
Greece	Nova Sports 4
Hungary	Sport 2
Italy	Sky Calcio 12
Malaysia	Astro SuperSport 2
Mexico	Canal 5
New Zealand	SKY Box Office 200
Philippines	GMA Network, Solar TV (free to air); Solar Sports (cable)
Poland	Polsat Sport Extra
Portugal	SPORT TV2
Qatar	Al Jazeera Sports 1
Romania	Sport.ro
Russia	NTV Plus Sport
Slovakia	Sport 1
South Africa	SuperSport 2
Spain	Taquilla 3
Ukraine	Sport 1
United Kingdom	Sky Sports 1
United States	HBO PPV
United States	Movie Theaters via NCM Fathom
United States	US Military via AFN Sports
Venezuela	Meridiano

Preceded by vs. Juan Manuel Márquez	Floyd Mayweather Jr.'s bouts 1 May 2010	Succeeded by vs. Victor Ortiz
Preceded by vs. Antonio Margarito	Shane Mosley's bouts 1 May 2010	Succeeded by vs. Sergio Mora
