= Oscar De La Hoya vs. Shane Mosley II =

Boxing match

Redemption
- Date: September 13, 2003
- Venue: MGM Grand Garden Arena, Paradise, Nevada, U.S.
- Title(s) on the line: WBA (Unified), WBC, IBA and The Ring light middleweight titles

Tale of the tape
| Boxer | Oscar De La Hoya | Shane Mosley |
| Nickname | The Golden Boy | Sugar |
| Hometown | East Los Angeles, California, U.S. | Pomona, California, U.S. |
| Purse | $12,000,000 | $4,500,000 |
| Pre-fight record | 36–2 (29 KO) | 38–2 (1) (35 KO) |
| Age | 30 years, 7 months | 32 years |
| Height | 5 ft 10 1/2 in (179 cm) | 5 ft 9 in (175 cm) |
| Weight | 154 lb (70 kg) | 154 lb (70 kg) |
| Style | Orthodox | Orthodox |
| Recognition | WBA (Unified), WBC, IBA, and The Ring light middleweight champion The Ring pound-for-pound No. 4 ranked fighter 4-division world champion | The Ring pound-for-pound No. 10 ranked fighter 2-division world champion |

Result
- Mosley wins via 12–round unanimous decision (115–113, 115–113, 115–113)

Oscar De La Hoya vs. Shane Mosley II, billed as Redemption, was a professional boxing match contested on September 13, 2003 for De La Hoya's WBA (Unified), WBC, IBA, and The Ring light middleweight championship.

== Background ==
De La Hoya and Mosley had previously met on June 17, 2000. De La Hoya was making the first defense of the WBC welterweight championship he had been awarded after the then-champion Félix Trinidad vacated the title after moving up and winning the WBA light–middleweight title. In a closely contested match, Mosley was given a split decision victory to claim the title. Two of the judges gave Mosley the fight with scores of 116–112 and 115–113, while the third had De La Hoya the winner by a score of 115–113. Because of the closeness of the fight, talks of rematch began immediately after, with Mosley stating "He gave me an opportunity to fight him. If he wants a rematch, I've got to give it to him."

Over two years would pass, however, until the De La Hoya and Mosley agreed to terms for a September 2003 rematch. The two fighters would initially reach an agreement in December 2002 to fight for De La Hoya's WBA, WBC, The Ring and lineal super welterweight titles. De La Hoya would make $12 million, while Mosley was set to make $4.25 million. The fight was also contingent on Mosley getting past Raúl Márquez on February 8, 2003. Though Mosley fought to Marquez a no-contest (the fight was stopped early due to accidental head butts that caused a bad cut to Marquez), he was still offered the chance to continue forward with his planned De La Hoya rematch. However, the bout was briefly cancelled when Mosley asked for his $4.25 million purse to be increased by another $1.25 million for a total of $5.50 million. De La Hoya's promoter Bob Arum refused and declared that the rematch was "over, done, finished". Despite Arum's claims, negotiations resumed and the two sides once again reached an agreement in March, with De La Hoya first needing to defeat Luis "Yori Boy" Campas. Mosley's purse was increased to $4.50 million, with an additional $500,000 to come from De La Hoya's purse should he win. After De La Hoya defeated Campas by technical knockout, the De La Hoya–Mosley fight was finally made official.

== The fight ==
The fight was another closely contested bout between the two. Though neither man scored a knockdown, De La Hoya seemed to be in control for most of the fight, throwing both more punches than and outlanding Mosley in every category. Mosley would finish the fight strong however and was able to hurt De La Hoya in later rounds. With the fight going the full 12 rounds, the decision was left up to the judge's scorecards. Despite De La Hoya's superiority in the punch stats (De La Hoya landed 221 of 616 punches as opposed to Mosley's 127 of 496), Mosley was awarded the controversial unanimous decision with most of the fans thinking it was a clear cut win for De La Hoya all three judges scoring the fight 115–113 (seven rounds to five) in his favor. The decision angered De La Hoya who stated "Obviously, I thought I won the fight. I didn't think it was close."

== Aftermath ==
Feeling that he had clearly won the fight, De La Hoya officially launched an official protest shortly after the fight. De La Hoya stated that he felt "something was wrong" with the scoring and vowed to "get to the bottom of it." De La Hoya's trainer Floyd Mayweather Sr. also weighed in, calling the judges "blind and senile".

A post-fight poll taken by Top Rank, Bob Arum's promotional company, showed that 16 ringsiders had Mosley winning the fight, 8 in favor of De La Hoya, and 4 scoring the fight as a draw.

HBO's broadcast team of Jim Lampley, Larry Merchant, and former heavyweight champ and color commentator George Foreman was also surprised by the decision. Harold Lederman, HBO's "unofficial ringside judge," scored the fight 115-113 for De la Hoya. Lampley pointed out that 4 out of 5 sportswriters at ringside had Mosley as the winner. Foreman, a longtime De La Hoya supporter, showed the most disdain for the decision. ("This is terrible, this is not what you want boxing to be." "Impossible." "Something is going on here.") Foreman even suggested that an investigation should be launched into the possibility of the decision being a "protest vote" aimed against Bob Arum.

== Undercard ==
Confirmed bouts:

| Winner | Loser | Weight division/title belt(s) disputed | Result |
|---|---|---|---|
| (Puerto Rico) Miguel Cotto | (Panama) Demetrio Ceballos | WBC International Light welterweight title WBC/WBA Light welterweight eliminator | 7th round TKO |
| (Mexico) Juan Lazcano | (United States) Stevie Johnston | WBC Lightweight eliminator | 11th round TKO |
Non-TV bouts
| (United States) Urbano Antillón | (Mexico) Martin Bermudez | Lightweight (8 rounds) | 6th round TKO |

== Broadcasting ==
| Country | Broadcaster |
|---|---|
| Australia | Main Event |
| United Kingdom | Sky Sports |
| United States | HBO |

| Preceded by vs. Yori Boy Campas | Oscar De La Hoya's bouts 13 September 2003 | Succeeded by vs. Felix Sturm |
| Preceded by vs. Raúl Márquez | Shane Mosley's bouts 13 September 2003 | Succeeded by vs. Winky Wright |
