= Shane Mosley =

American boxer (born 1971)

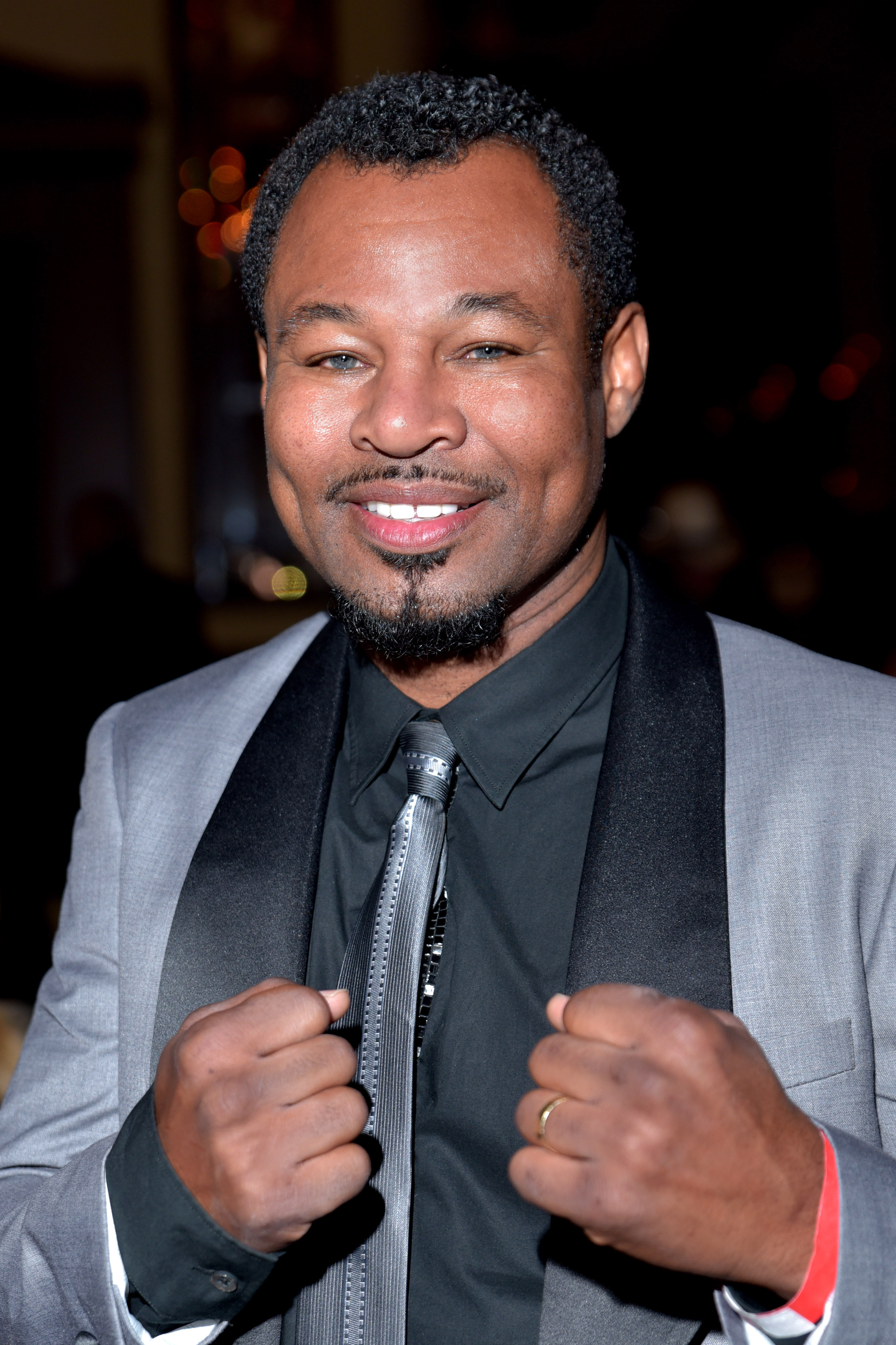
- Mosley in 2018

Personal information
- Nicknames: Sugar; Azucar
- Born: Shane Mosley; September 7, 1971 (age 55) Lynwood, California, U.S.
- Height: 5 ft 9 in (175 cm)
- Weight: Lightweight; Welterweight; Light middleweight

Boxing career
- Reach: 70 in (178 cm)
- Stance: Orthodox

Boxing record
- Total fights: 61
- Wins: 49
- Win by KO: 41
- Losses: 10
- Draws: 1
- No contests: 1

Shane Mosley (born September 7, 1971), often known by his nickname "Sugar" Shane Mosley, is an American former professional boxer who competed from 1993 to 2016. He held multiple world championships in three weight classes, including the IBF lightweight title; the WBA (Super) and WBC welterweight titles; and the WBA (Super), WBC, and The Ring magazine light middleweight titles. He was also a lineal champion at welterweight (twice) and light middleweight.

In 1998, the Boxing Writers Association of America named Mosley as their Fighter of the Year. He was also given the same honor by the International Boxing Hall of Fame in 2000. In 2000 and 2001, he was named the world's best active boxer, pound for pound, by The Ring.

== Early years ==
Mosley was born in Lynwood, California, and raised in Pomona, California. He has two older sisters, Venus and Cerena. Mosley became interested in boxing after watching his father, Jack, box in street fights. Mosley has been trained and managed by his father since the age of eight.

== Amateur career ==
Mosley was an amateur standout, capturing various amateur titles, including:

- 1989 United States Amateur Champion at Lightweight 132 lb (60 kg)
- 1989 World Junior Championships Silver Medalist in San Juan, Puerto Rico 132 lb (60 kg)
- 1990 United States Amateur Champion at Lightweight 132 lb (60 kg)
- 1990 Goodwill Games Bronze Medalist in Seattle (USA) 132 lb (60 kg)
- 1992 United States Amateur Champion at Light Welterweight 139 lb (63 kg)

As an amateur, Mosley completed a record of 250–16.

== Professional career ==
=== Early career ===
On February 11, 1993, a 21-year-old Mosley made his professional boxing debut in a scheduled six-round fight at the Hollywood Palladium in Hollywood, California. His opponent was Greg Puente, who he knocked out in round five. Mosley fought a further 6 times in 1993, winning all of them inside the distance. In 1994, Mosley fought 9 times, winning all of them and 8 inside the distance. He was taken the 10 round distance by Oscar Lopez. In April 1995, Mosley knocked out Raul Hernandez in round 2 at the Warner Center Marriott in Woodland Hills, California. In July, he knocked out 34-year-old veteran Mauricio Aceves in round 4 at the Arrowhead Pond in Anaheim, California. Aceves was best known for being the first-ever WBO World lightweight champion.

In January 1996, Mosley had his first fight outside of California since beginning his pro career. He fought at the Grand Casino in Biloxi, Mississippi, knocking out 35-year-old Mike Bryan in round one. By May 1997, Mosley went 23 fights unbeaten, with 22 coming inside the distance.

=== Lightweight ===
==== Mosley vs. Holiday ====
On August 2, 1997, Mosley fought for his first world title, the IBF Lightweight championship against then undefeated titleholder Philip Holiday (31–0, 16 KOs). Holiday was making his seventh defence of the title since winning the then vacant title in 1995. It took place at the Mohegan Sun Casino in Uncasville, Connecticut, and was the first time Mosley was scheduled to box 12 rounds. The fight went the full 12 round distance as Mosley took Holiday's IBF title via a unanimous decision. The three judges scored the fight 116–113, 117–111, 115–114 all in favor of Mosley.

==== Early Title Defenses ====
Mosley made his first title defense on November 25 at the County Coliseum in El Paso, Texas, against Mexican Manuel Gomez (17–8, 14 KOs). Mosley knocked Gomez out in round 11 to retain his title.

On February 6, 1998, Mosley defeated 24-year-old Demetrio Ceballos (20–1, 13 KOs) at the Mohegan Sun Casino in Uncasville. Ceballos was down once in round 4 after an overhand right and left hook to the body. He was down again in round 8 following a flurry of punches before referee Eddie Cotton called an end to the fight. At the time of stoppage, Mosley was ahead on all cards (70–61, 70–62, 70–62).

In May 1998, Mosley knocked out former world super featherweight champion and world lightweight challenger John John Molina (45–4, 30 KOs) in round 8 at the Trump Taj Mahal in Atlantic City, New Jersey. Molina was also dropped to his knees in round 7.

On June 27, 1998, Mosely knocked out Colombian boxer Wilfrido Ruiz (25–3, 19 KOs) in round 5. He then fought at the Madison Square Garden Theater in New York City on September 22, 1998, against Eduardo Bartolome Morales (26–0, 21 KOs). Morales was knocked down in the 3rd round, and eventually stopped in round 5.

==== Mosley vs. Leija, Johnson ====
On November 14, 1998, Mosley faced his toughest defense to date when he fought 32-year-old former WBC super featherweight champion Jesse James Leija (37–3–2, 15 KOs) at the Foxwoods Resort in Mashantucket, Connecticut. This was Mosley's sixth defense of his IBF world title. As the fight progressed, Leija was knocked down in rounds 6, 7 and 9. The fight was stopped when Leija couldn't answer the bell for round 10, rewarding Mosley with a deserved victory. Mosley was leading by scores of 89–78, 89–78 and 88–79 at the time of the stoppage. Leija took the fight with 3 weeks notice.

Mosley took only two months out returning to the ring to defend his title in January 1999 against American Golden Johnson (15–2–2, 10 KOs) at the Civic Center in Pensacola, Florida. The fight ended when Mosley connected Johnson with a flurry of punches as he was against the ropes and then dropped to both knees. He beat the count, but was put down again seconds later, ending the fight.

On April 17, 1999, Mosley made his 8th and final defense of the IBF lightweight title against former USBA super featherweight champion John Brown (19–5, 10 KOs) at the Fantasy Springs Casino in Indio, California. The fight was stopped after round 8, when the ringside doctor intervened. Mosley won the fight via TKO to retain his title.

=== Welterweight ===
Mosley vacated his lightweight title and moved up two weight divisions to welterweight, scored two consecutive knockouts against Wilfredo Rivera and Willy Wise, setting up a huge fight against Oscar De La Hoya for the WBC welterweight title.

==== Mosley vs. De La Hoya ====
On June 17, 2000, Mosley met De La Hoya in Los Angeles for the WBC, IBA & vacant lineal welterweight titles. This was the first boxing event to take place at the newly built Staples Center. After twelve rounds, Mosley emerged with a split decision victory. During the fight, neither man was in danger of going down, but both had badly swollen faces at the end and De La Hoya was bleeding from the nose for several rounds. Mosley earned a minimum of $15 million, while De La Hoya was guaranteed $35 million. Judges Lou Filippo and Pat Russell scored the fight 116–112, and 115–113, respectively for Mosley whilst judge Marty Sammon had it 113–115 for De La Hoya. The fight was named The Ring magazine Event of the Year for 2000.

==== Mosley vs. Diaz, Taylor ====
Mosley defended his newly won titles on November 11, 2000, at the Madison Square Garden Theater in New York against Mexican boxer Antonio Diaz (35–2, 24 KOs). The fight lasted six rounds, after Mosley knocked Diaz down twice. Diaz was also down once in round 2.

On March 10, 2001, Mosley was scheduled to fight unbeaten Australian Shannan Taylor (28–0–1, 18KOs) at Caesars Palace in Las Vegas. Shannan was knocked down once in the first round. He was losing all rounds, up until the end of the fifth round. Taylor lost the fight when he decided not to return for round 6.

==== Mosley vs. Stone ====
On July 21, 2001, Mosley easily beat IBO World super welterweight champion Adrian Stone (30–3–2, 23 KOs) knocking him out in round 3. The fight took place at Caesars Palace in Las Vegas. Stone moved down to welterweight for the first time in three years to challenge Mosley and was losing the first 2-round before being stopped. Following the win, Mosley said he would like to have a rematch with De La Hoya in a split 50/50 fight or a unification fight against unbeaten Vernon Forrest.

==== Mosley vs. Forrest I, II ====
It was finally announced that Mosley would be defending his WBC and Lineal welterweight titles against Vernon Forrest (33–0, 26 KOs). The fight took place at the Madison Square Garden Theater in New York City on January 26, 2002. The Ring Magazine welterweight title was also at stake. Mosley was knocked down twice in the second round as he went on to lose a unanimous decision, his first loss in his professional career. In round 2, Mosley suffered a cut at the hairline from an accidental clash of heads. The final scorecards read 115–110, 117–108 and 118–108 all in favor of Forrest.

Mosley and Forrest met in an immediate rematch on July 20, 2002, at the Conseco Fieldhouse in Indianapolis. Forrest being the 'A' side, received $3.42 million compared to Mosley's $2.8 million. The fight was also known at the time for its attendance of 15,775 which was the largest boxing crowd ever in Indiana. The fight went the full 12 round distance. The scorecards were closer than the first fight, however still had Forrest as the winner (117–111, 116–112, 115–113) unanimously. USA Today scored it 115–113 in favor of Forrest. Forrest kept on the outside using his height and reach as an advantage.

=== Light middleweight ===
Mosley's first fight at light middleweight was scheduled to take place on February 8, 2003, against former IBF light-middleweight title holder Raúl Márquez at the Mandalay Bay Events Center in Paradise, Nevada. The fight ended in a no contest when Mosley accidentally head butted Marquez twice in round three, which caused two very bad cuts above the eyes of Marquez. Mosley earned a $2 million purse for the fight.

==== Mosley vs. De La Hoya II ====
Mosley and De La Hoya faced each other for the second time on September 13, this time with De La Hoya's The Ring, WBC, WBA and lineal light middleweight championships on the line. Mosley defeated De La Hoya by a controversial 12 round unanimous decision and joined the exclusive group of world boxing champions that have reigned in three or more divisions. Many fans had Oscar easily beating Mosley in this rematch but judges scored it differently regardless of De La Hoya landing over 100 more punches. Mosley testified in 2003 that he injected himself with the notorious doping agent EPO as he prepared for his light-middleweight title fight against Oscar De La Hoya, according to grand jury transcripts and doping calendars.

==== Mosley vs. Wright ====
Mosley made the first defense of his unified WBC, WBA Super and The Ring Magazine world light middleweight titles on March 13, 2004, against IBF champion Ronald Wright (46–3, 25 KOs) at the Mandalay Bay Resort & Casino in Las Vegas. Prior to taking this bout, Mosley turned down an offer to fight Félix Trinidad in a bout that would have seen him receive $10 million. Wright, who was a 5-to-2 underdog, won the fight via a unanimous decision. Judges Dave Moretti and Chuck Giampa scored it 117–111, while Paul Smith had it 116–112 all in Wright's favor. In the fast-paced bout, Mosley was unable to get on the inside. Wright's southpaw stance made it difficult for him, as he threw jabs and straight left to both the face and body of Mosley. CompuBox stats shows that Wright out-landed Mosley landing 250 punches to 166 from Mosley. In the post-fight interview, Mosley said about the Trinidad fight being in jeopardy, "It was not a mistake. I have no regrets. I wanted to find out who was the best in our division. I was fighting for history." Mosley earned $2.1 million, while Wright was paid $750,000.

==== Mosley vs. Wright II ====
Instead of the big money fight against Félix Trinidad, Mosley fought Ronald Wright in a rematch on November 20, 2004, at the Mandalay Bay Resort & Casino. The fight was for the WBC, WBA Super and The Ring Magazine world title. Wright was stripped of the IBF title on April 19, 2004, because he agreed to have a rematch with Mosley instead of defending the title against the mandatory challenger Kassim Ouma. The fight aired live on HBO. The fight went the 12 round distance. Both fighters were tired during the last round and clinched for most of it. After the final bell rang, both fighters showed respect to each other and embraced in the ring. One judge had it had it 114–114 even, whilst the other two scored it 115–113 in favor of Wright, meaning he scored back to back victories over Mosley. Wright landed 119 punches more than Mosley.

==== Mosley vs. Estrada ====
Following his consecutive losses to Wright, Mosley was on a comeback trail to rebuild and once again challenge for a world title. His next fight took place at Caesars Palace in Las Vegas on April 23, 2005, against David Estrada (18–1, 9 KOs) in a scheduled 10 round bout. The fight went the distance as Mosley was announced the victor. There were two wide scores of 99–91 and 98–93 and a closer margin score of 97–93. The fight wasn't focused on if Mosley won, but more how dominant he would be in doing so. Mosley received $500,000 for the fight.

Mosley next fought five months later in September against undefeated former Mexico welterweight champion Jose Luis Cruz (33–0–2, 28 KOs) in 10 round bout. Much like the Estrada fight, Mosley won a unanimous decision with scores of 96–94, 97–93, and 98–92.

==== Mosley vs. Vargas I, II ====
In November 2005, negotiations were complete and a fight between Mosley and former light middleweight champion Fernando Vargas (26–2, 22 KOs) was confirmed as a WBA light middleweight title eliminator. The fight was scheduled to take place on February 25, 2006, live on HBO PPV at the Mandalay Bay in Las Vegas. Mosley was guaranteed $3 million from the fight plus percentages of the PPV revenue. Mosley won the bout via 10th-round technical knockout after Vargas' left eye was completely closed. Vargas claimed the cut and closure of his eye was not due to a punch, but because of clash of heads. At the time of stoppage, two judges had Mosley was ahead on two cards at 86–85, 86–85 and the third judge had Vargas ahead 86–85. The fight exceeded financial expectations generating 415,000 buys and $18.6 million in revenue.

A rematch was made to take place on July 15 at the MGM Grand Garden Arena in Las Vegas. Mosley was to earn $4 million plus a percentage and Vargas had a base purse of $3 million plus upside on the pay-per-view. Mosley floored Vargas with a left hook in the sixth and Vargas had a very hard time in getting up. Referee Kenny Bayless stopped the fight moments later. At the time of the stoppage, Mosley had won every round on all three judges' cards. Mosley was quicker than Vargas, easily winning rounds with his speed and combinations. At the time of stoppage, the scorecards were much more close than the first fight with Mosley winning 5 rounds to non on all three scorecards. The attendance for the bout was 9,722. After the fight Mosley said, "When I was in the ring I remembered watching Oscar fight Vargas, and he threw that perfect left hook. I was bouncing around and I saw the opportunity and I threw the perfect left hook." Mosley also talked about moving back down to welterweight. HBO confirmed the bout did 350,000 buys, generating $17.5 million in revenue.

=== Return to welterweight ===
==== Mosley vs. Collazo ====
Despite being in position to challenge for the WBA light middleweight title, Mosley decided to return to the welterweight division. In January 2007, Mosley and former WBA welterweight champion Lus Collazo (27–2, 13 KOs) announced that they would meet on February 10, 2007, at the Mandalay Bay Hotel in Las Vegas, Nevada in a fight billed as "Battle at the Bay". The interim WBC welterweight title was at stake because then full WBC champion Floyd Mayweather Jr. had planned to move up to light middleweight to challenge Oscar De La Hoya. There was no confirmation as to whether Mayweather would stay at 154 or return to 147 after that bout. Mosley knocked Collazo down in round 11 with a right hook and went on to win a fairly one-sided fight with judges scoring the fight 119–108, 118–109 and 118–109. Mosley was guaranteed $1 million for the fight.

==== Mosley vs. Cotto ====
It was announced on August 15, 2007, that Mosley would challenge undefeated Miguel Cotto (30–0, 25 KOs) for his WBA welterweight title. The fight, being billed as "Fast & Furious" was announced to take place at the Madison Square Garden in New York on HBO PPV.

On fight night the attendance was 17,135. Cotto landed the better shots in round one and most of round two, however, Mosley landed some good rights at the end of the second. Both landed big shots in round three with Cotto momentarily rocked by a right hand. The two fighters then had some good exchanges in the fourth. Round five was close, but Cotto appeared to be taking control in the sixth. Mosley adjusted and tried boxing from the outside in the seventh round. The boxing continued in the eighth as Mosley moved and Cotto pursued. Mosley hurt Cotto in the ninth round but Cotto fought back gamely at the end of the round. Mosley dominated the first half of the tenth, but Cotto rallied in the second half. Mosley pressed in the eleventh, but Cotto landed some great counter-punches to win the round. Possibly thinking he had the fight won, Cotto stayed out of range in the final round. Two judges scored the fight 115–113 and the third judge had it 116–113 all in favor of Cotto, who retained his WBA title and gave Mosley his fifth professional loss. Both fighters landed 248 punches with Cotto having the better connect rate due to throwing 101 fewer punches. Mosley showed his professionalism, saying "Good luck champ. You're a real warrior" to Cotto, on his way out of the ring. Mosley earned a purse of $2 million and the fight garnered 400,000 PPV buys.

=== Return to light middleweight ===
==== Mosley vs. Mayorga ====
In August 2008, it was announced that Mosley would fight at light middleweight against former world champion Ricardo Mayorga (28–6–1, 22 KOs). The fight was to take place at Home Depot Center in California on September 27, 2008. The first time since 2000 that Mosley would fight in his home state. The fight was for the vacant WBA Inter-Continental light middleweight title. Mosley was guaranteed $1 million. During the first three rounds of the bout, the harder puncher appeared to be Mayorga, who landed right hands from long range. Mayorga's roughhousing mixed with his usual showboating antics seemed to bother Mosley, who appeared more uncomfortable and agitated. In recklessly lunging in with wild power shots of his own Mosley wound up falling into more clinches and getting caught with punches he should have avoided. Mosley settled down and found the distance in the fourth round and took the next three rounds by timing Mayorga with overhand rights that landed and occasionally following up with short hooks and single body shots. Mosley continued with right hands in the seventh and eighth rounds. Mosley was able to land single power shots in the late rounds, but threw very few combinations. At times Mayorga beat Mosley to the punch with lead right hands. Near the end of the eleventh round, Mosley landed a right hand that splattered blood from Mayorga's mouth. With less than a minute left in the bout, Mosley knocked Mayorga down to his hands and knees. Mayorga got up on unsteady legs; Mosley stepped in with a short, lead left hook that put Mayorga flat on his back at the bell, resulting in the referee waving the bout off. At the time of stoppage, two judges had Mosley ahead with scores of 107–102 and 105–104, whilst the third judge had Mayorga ahead 105–104. Had the fight gone to scorecards, Mosley would have won via unanimous decision due to the last round being a 10–7.

=== Second return at welterweight ===
==== Mosley vs. Margarito ====
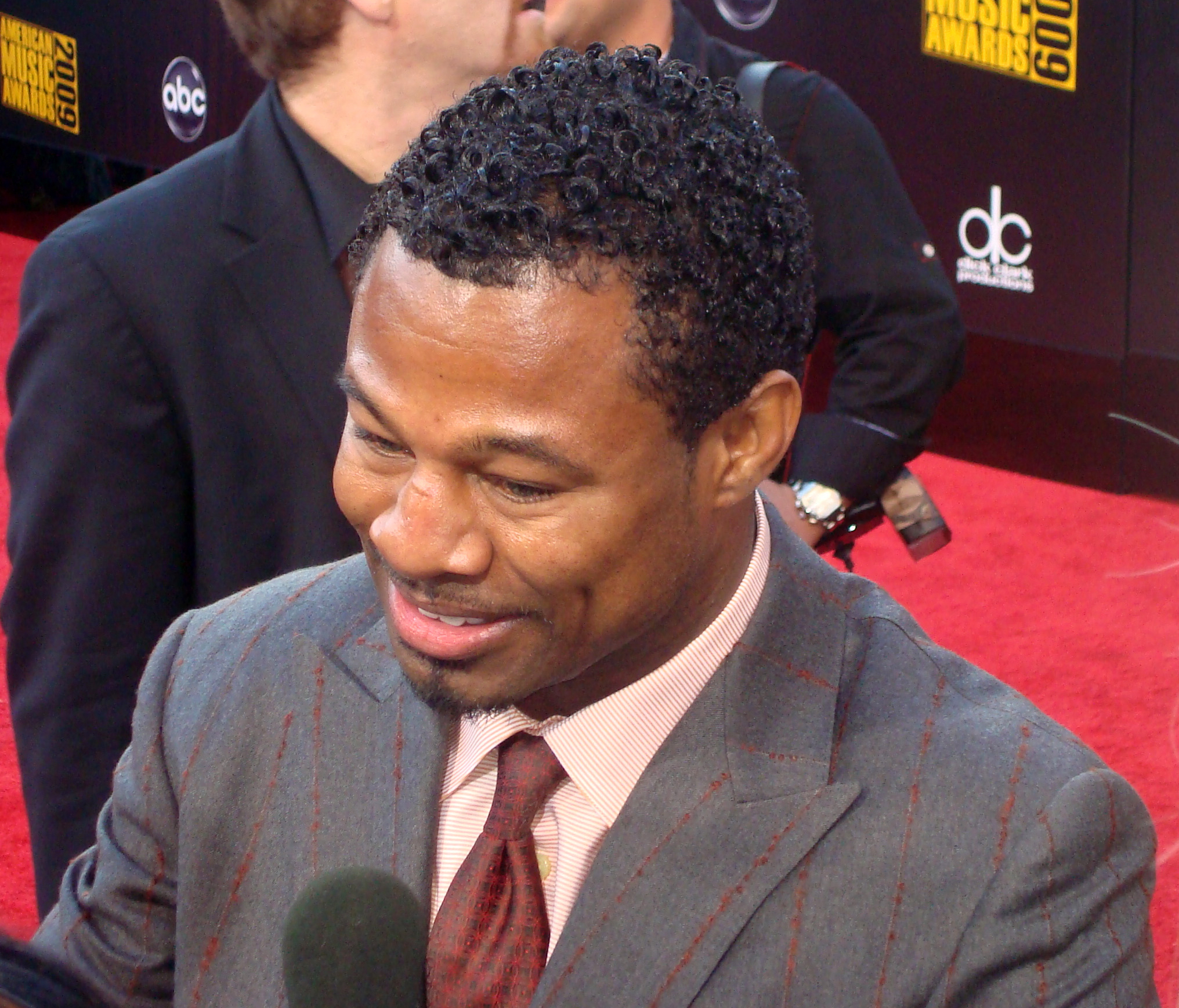
Mosley at the American Music Awards of 2009

Prior to one of the biggest fights of his career, Mosley began training with Naazim Richardson. Mosley regained the WBA (Super) welterweight title from Antonio Margarito on January 24, 2009, at the Staples Center in Los Angeles. Mosley, now 37 years old, came into the fight as a 4–1 underdog with the bookies after Margarito had spectacularly stopped Cotto 6 months earlier. Prior to the bout, very few gave Mosley a chance of prevailing, with the prevailing view that Margarito was too strong and young for Mosley. The conventional wisdom was that this was a mismatch, which would end in a brutal retirement-forcing stoppage for "Sugar" Shane. A comparison of their last fights; the aforementioned destruction of Cotto by Margarito and a last-gasp knockout by Mosley in a hard twelve-round struggle against Mayorga did not bode well for Mosley. Some predicted a massacre. And it was – only it was Margarito that was ruthlessly clubbed about the ring, unable to land any meaningful shots.

Mosley eventually TKO'd Margarito in the ninth round, after appearing to win every round up until then, in a massive upset. Sugar Shane utterly dominated Margarito, using his superior hand speed, pinpoint accuracy, consistent body punching, countless huge right hands to the jaw and tying up when Margarito backed him into the ropes, to wear Margarito down and stop him—something that many seasoned boxing observers thought was nigh-on impossible. After knocking him down with a series of heavy overhand rights at the end of the eighth round, Margarito was unable to avoid punches during a heavy barrage from Mosley early on in the ninth, forcing the referee to step in as Margarito slumped to the canvas a second time. Margarito had never previously been stopped. It was a sensational win for Sugar Shane and propelled him back to the upper echelons of the welterweight division and the sport of Boxing, in addition to further cementing his legacy as one of the best fighters in his era.

The fight was marred in a controversy after Mosley's trainer, Naazim Richardson diligently spotted a gauze knuckle pad accessory in Margarito's hand wraps. California State Athletic Commission officials had Margarito re-wrap his hands and took the pad for testing: a state laboratory likened the substance to plaster of Paris. Margarito and trainer Javier Capetillo would be suspended for a year by CSAC: this effectively banned them from boxing across the United States, as suspensions in one state are usually also enforced by other commissions. Later investigations determined that Margarito was likely loading his gloves for several other fights as well, including his title win over Miguel Cotto.

The fight was for Margarito's WBA title and the vacant Lineal welterweight championship of Cyber Boxing Zone (CBZ). The Ring did not recognize this bout for its vacant welterweight championship despite the fact it pitted The Ring #1 ranked welterweight, Antonio Margarito, vs. The Ring #3 ranked welterweight, Shane Mosley. Coming in the bout, Margarito had just TKO'd the previous The Ring #1 ranked welterweight and current The Ring #2 ranked welterweight, Miguel Cotto. After the fight, Mosley was named The Ring's #1 ranked welterweight.

==== Mosley vs. Mayweather ====
It was announced that on May 1, 2010, Mosley would fight undefeated Floyd Mayweather Jr. Boxing purists had called for the fight for over ten years. Mosley was scheduled to fight WBC champion Andre Berto in a unification fight, but Berto had to pull out after an Earthquake in Haiti killed some of his family members. Mosley's WBA title was not on the line because Mayweather refused to pay WBA sanctioning fees. On the fight night, Mosley stunned Mayweather with two right-hand shots in the second round. Mayweather recovered well and dominated the remainder of the fight with superior reflexes and his effective counter-punching style, eventually beating Mosley in a wide decision 119–109, 119–109, and 118–110 on the scorecards to win Mosley's lineal welterweight championship.

On May 22, 2010, Mosley was stripped of his WBA (Super) welterweight title, due to not making a mandatory defense, which in turn made WBA Champion Vyacheslav Senchenko the sole WBA titlist in the welterweight division.

=== Second return at light middleweight ===
==== Mosley vs Mora ====
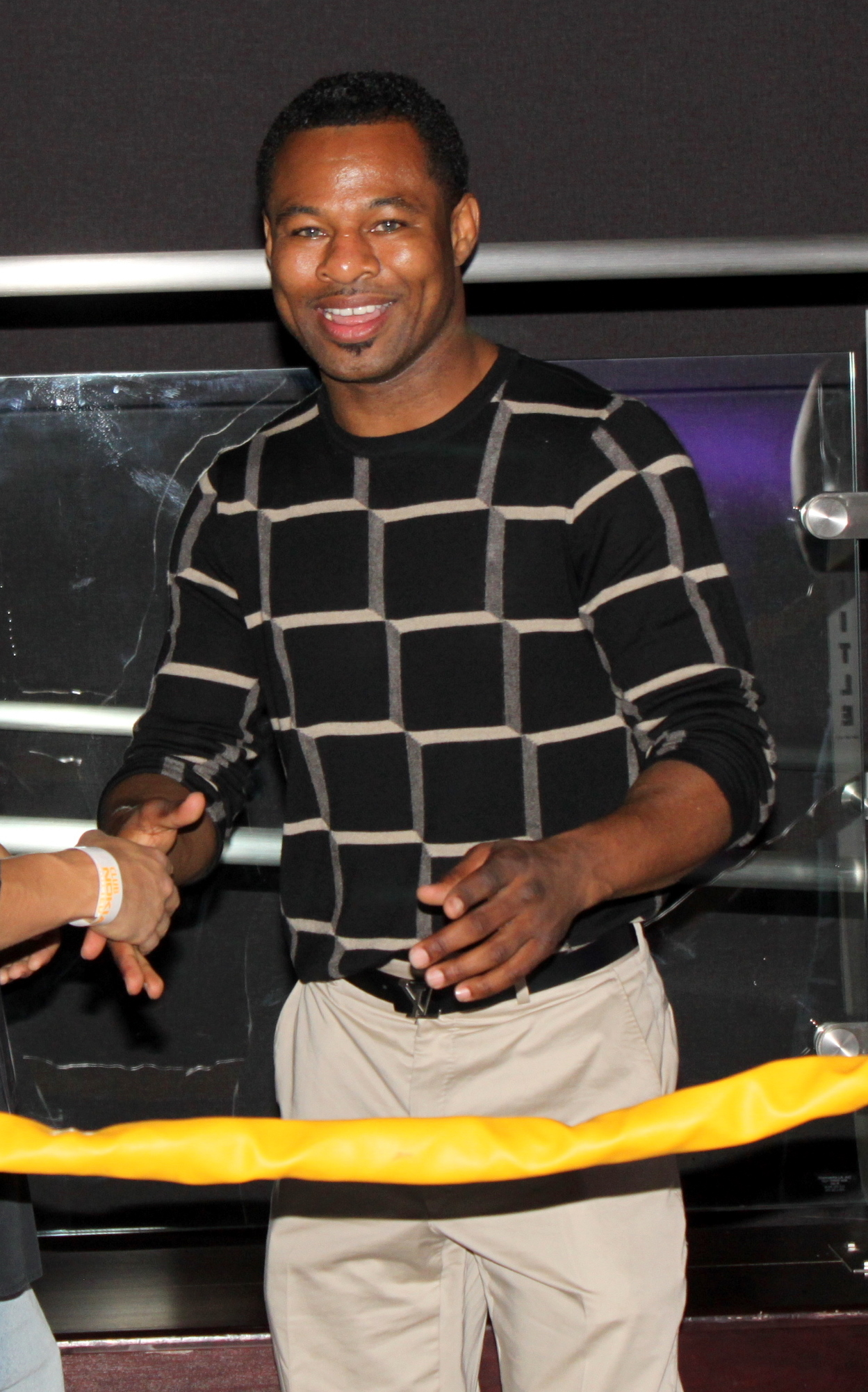
Mosley at the Club Nokia in September 2010

On June 30, 2010, it was announced Mosley would next fight former WBC light middleweight champion Sergio Mora (22–1–1, 6 KOs) at the Staples Center in Los Angeles on September 18. An official press conference took place at the end of August. The bout ended up being a highly disputed split draw, where many people thought that Mosley narrowly won the closely contested bout (boxing analyst website Boxrec had it 114–112 for Mosley). The judges scored the bout: Mora 115–113, Mosley 116–112 and 114–114. Punch stats showed that Mosley landed 161 of 522 punches (31%) compared to 93 of 508 thrown (18%) by Mora. The result was booed by the crowd, who began chanting "Canelo! Canelo!" Mosley felt the decision was fair, "We both fought hard. It was good fight, a good decision."

=== Third return at welterweight ===
==== Mosley vs. Pacquiao ====
On May 7, 2011, Mosley lost the fight to Manny Pacquiao for the WBO welterweight title at the MGM Grand in Las Vegas. Rapper LL Cool J performed as Mosley first entered the arena, while vocalist Jimi Jamison of the rock band Survivor sang "Eye of the Tiger" as Pacquiao approached the ring. Pacquiao knocked Mosley down in the third round using a one-two capped with a left straight. Mosley was left dazed by the knockdown but managed to stand up. Mosley floored Pacquiao in the tenth round with a push, but referee Kenny Bayless inexplicably ruled it a knockdown. None of the judges seemed to have bought it judging from the scores. Replays showed that Pacquiao was throwing a punch off balance, had his right foot stepped on by Mosley's left foot and went down with a little help from Mosley's right hand. Bayless apologized to Pacquiao after the fight for the mistake. Pacquiao gained one-sided verdicts from all three judges (119–108, 120–108, and 120–107). Due to Mosley's defeat, Pacquiao looked at a November 12, 2011, match-up, a third fight with Juan Manuel Márquez.

=== Third return at light middleweight, and first retirement ===
==== Mosley vs. Álvarez ====
In February 2012 it was announced that Mosley would fight 21 year old, highly regarded light middleweight champion Saul "Canelo" Álvarez (39–0–1, 29 KOs) on the Mayweather Jr.–Cotto PPV undercard on May 5 for the WBC light middleweight title at the MGM Grand in Las Vegas. Mosely entered with a record of 2–3–1 in his previous six bouts dating back to November 2007. At 40, Mosley was 19 years older than Álvarez. Álvarez was guaranteed $2 million whilst Mosley took the smaller amount of $650,000. Among those in attendance were Sugar Ray Leonard, Thomas Hearns, Bernard Hopkins, and Oscar De La Hoya.

The fight went to scorecards with Álvarez winning a one-sided decision with scores of 119–109, 119–109 and 118–110. ESPN scored the fight wide 118–110 for Álvarez. Álvarez landed more than half the punches he threw (348 of 673). According to CompuBox, it was the most an opponent had landed on Mosley in the 34 fights that they have tracked from his career. Álvarez paid respect to Mosley in the post-fight interview through a translator, "This was a great experience. I felt really good and I want to thank Shane for giving me this experience. He's a great fighter, a true veteran. I tried to knock him out. He took a lot of punches, but it didn't work." Mosley landed 183 of 745 punches (25%). Mosley spoke about stepping back from boxing, "His defense was really good and he was really fast. He can go a long ways. When the kids start to beat you, you might need to start going to promoting. I didn't expect him to be that fast or that good.

Mosley officially retired after this bout, ending his career with a record of 46–8–1, 39 KOs. He went 0–3–1 in his last 4 fights.

=== Comeback ===
==== Mosley vs. Cano, Mundine ====
On March 19, 2013, Mosley announced he was coming out of retirement to fight 23-year-old Pablo Cesar Cano (26–2–1, 20 KOs) in Cancún, Mexico. The fight was set to take place on May 18, 2013. Mosley won the fight via unanimous decision with all three judges scoring the bout 115–113. Cano was able to win the first few rounds but Mosley took control of the later rounds and pounded Cano until the final bell. With the win, Mosley won the vacant WBC International welterweight champion, picking up his first professional win since 2009.

Mosley fought Australian former professional rugby league footballer Anthony Mundine (44–5, 26 KOs) on November 27, 2013, at Allphones Arena in Sydney, Australia. The fight was due to take place on October 23, but Mosley dropped out due to contractual demands not being met, according to his promoter Richard Schaeffer. In the contract, it stated that the remaining $700,000 of Mosley's $1 million purse was due to be paid by 5pm. Mosley lost the fight after Mundine scored a technical knockout during round 6. Before the seventh round, Mosley retiring due to back spasms giving Mundine the victory via TKO. In the post-fight, Mundine praised Mosley, "I was in killer mode, but my heart goes out to Shane, I know he's a winner. He's not one to pull out for nothing. He's one of the greatest fighters to have ever lived." Mosley stated he would decide his future upon returning to the United States.

=== Second retirement ===
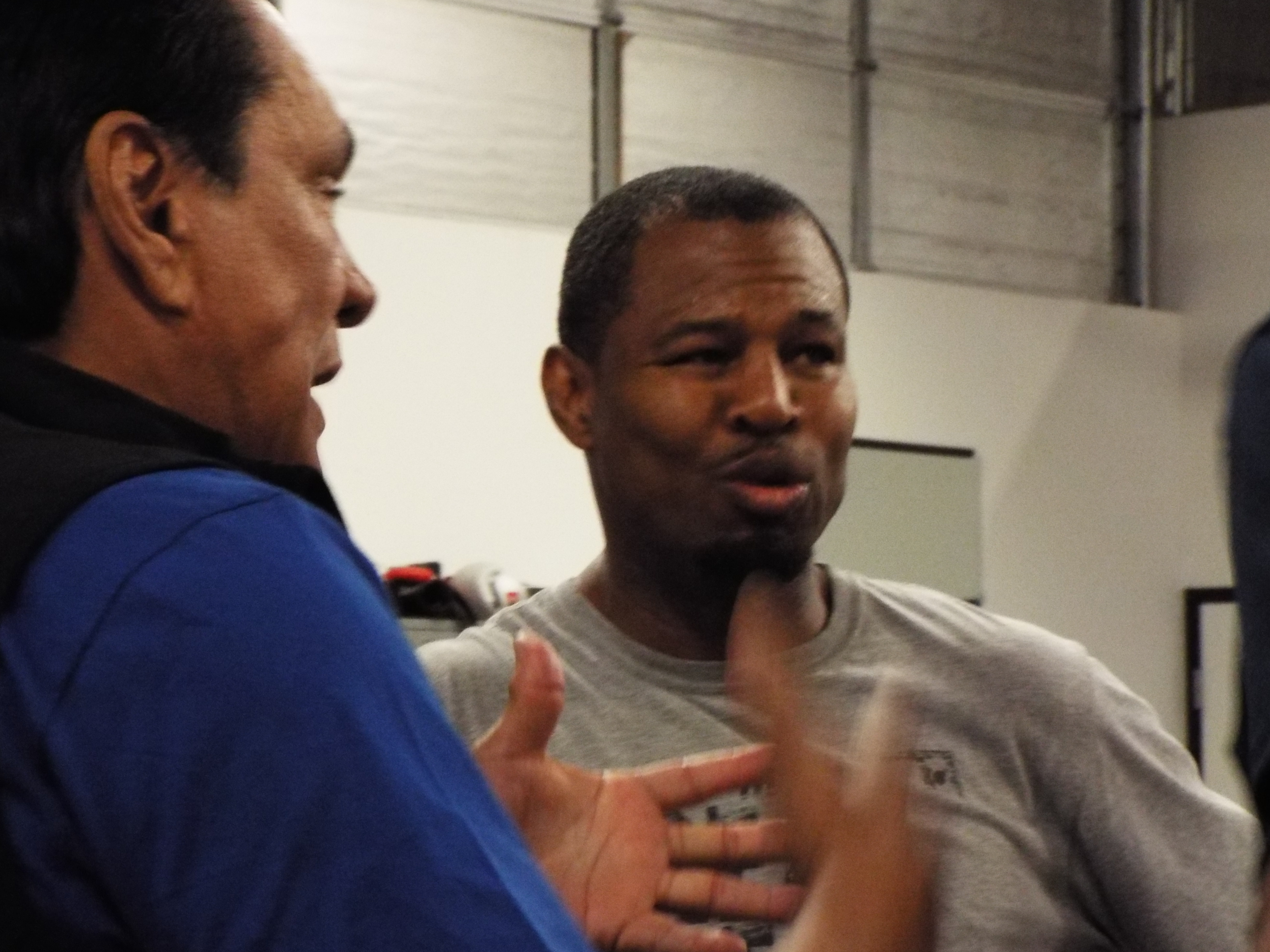
Mosley with his trainer Roberto Durán, 2016

Mosley announced his second retirement on December 7, 2013. He stated that he plans to become a trainer, to train his son, Shane Jr., and other young fighters. In an interview with World Boxing News, when asked if he had any desire to lace up his gloves and return to the ring professionally, he said he would only consider a return to the sport against the very top welterweights in the world. He specifically named Floyd Mayweather Jr., Manny Pacquiao, and Juan Manuel Márquez. He also said in another interview in early 2015 that he was not sure if he would fight again, but that he wanted to come back and face a fighter of similar age and specifically named Juan Manuel Márquez.

=== Final comeback in 2015 ===
==== Mosley vs. Mayorga II ====
On July 9, 2015, Mosley made a comeback announcement declaring he would fight former rival Ricardo Mayorga (31–8–1, 25 KOs) at a catchweight of 154 pounds on August 29 at The Forum in Los Angeles. On August 14, Don King filed a lawsuit, which stated that Mayorga still had a promotional contract with him dating back to 2009. Mayorga made a return to boxing in 2014. Legal documents showed that Mayorga, upon his return in 2014, signed a Memorandum of Understanding, confirming that his contract with King still stands. The contracted weight was changed to 158 pounds. At the weigh in, Mayorga came in 7.4 pounds heavier than the limit. Mosley also came in overweight. In the end, Mayorga weighed 165.4 pounds with Mosley much lighter at 159.8 pounds. During the face-off, Mosley's girlfriend, who was also helping promote the fight, soaked Mayorga, emptying a water bottle over his head. Mayorga did not react, although later appeared to slap her backside. Mosley immediately erupted, putting his hands on Mayorga's throat. Many outlets, including the WBC claimed it was all staged, to which Mosley's camp called the WBC appalling. The fight went ahead as planned. Mosley won the fight via 6th-round TKO following a body shot, which dropped Mayorga to his knees. The referee began the count, to which Mayorga did not beat. He later complained it was a low blow, but replays showed it was a legal blow. The time of stoppage was 2:59 on round 6.

==== Negotiations with Liam Smith ====
In October 2015, there were talks regarding Mosley challenging WBO light middleweight champion Liam Smith (21–0–1, 11 KOs) to take place later in December, in a fight which would see Mosley making his UK debut at the age of 44. Mosley was said to be excited about the potential fight and told World Boxing News, "I might take the fight with Liam Smith, but they say we must have a rematch clause." He went on to say that if Smith wanted a rematch, he would have to take it within eight weeks or after October 2016, due to plans already made for early 2016. By the end of October, Mosley pulled out of the negotiations as he would not accept the rematch clause. In a statement he said, "There's no way I should have taken that fight for less than a million and I took it damn near for free, but they blew it over an immediate [rematch]. It's strange." Mosley believed Smith should have been more grateful in fighting him.

==== Mosley vs. Lopez, Avanesyan ====
On December 2, 2015, it was announced that Mosley would next fight 37 year old Venezuelan veteran Patrick López (23–6, 14 KOs) at the Roberto Durán Arena in Panama City, Panama for the WBA Continental super welterweight title on December 17, in a scheduled 10 round bout. Both boxers came in at around the welterweight limit, with Mosley slightly heavier and López fighting for the first time in 13 months. López was knocked down in the 2nd round following a left hook and a further three times in the last round, which put an end to the fight. Mosley improved his ledger to 49 victories, with 41 of those victories coming inside the distance. At the time of stoppage, the three judges' had the fight 87–83, 86–84, 88–83 in favour of Mosley.

On March 28, 2016, it was announced that Mosley would challenge WBA Interim welterweight champion David Avanesyan (21–1–1, 11 KOs) at the Gila River Arena in Glendale, Arizona. on May 28. The winner would then be the mandatory for the winner of the Thurman-Porter fight. Prior to the fight being announced, legendary hall of famer Roberto Durán became Mosley's trainer. This also marked the first time Avanesyan would fight in the United States. At the time of the fight, Mosley was ranked number 3 by the WBA. Mosley lost the fight after going the distance. Avanesyan won all three judges' scorecards (117–110 twice, 114–113). Mosley started off the fight quick as the aggressor. As the middle rounds passed, Avanesyan began to take over. Despite the two wide scorecards, the fight was seen as being much closer and competitive.

==== Cancelled Kurbanov fight ====
In March 2017, Mosley announced that he would fight on against unbeaten Russian prospect Magomed Kurbanov (10–0, 8 KOs) at DIVS in Ekaterinburg on May 5, 2017. The fight would take place at light middleweight in a 10-round bout and contested for the vacant WBO Inter-Continental title. In April, RCC Boxing Promotion revealed that Mosley had picked up a hand injury whilst training. The fight was pushed back to take place on September 9, 2017, instead. On June 29, 2017, it was reported that Mosley had an unsuccessful surgery in his back, which required him to undergo another surgery. The fight was pushed back again to December 2017; however, because Mosley could not guarantee he would be fully recovered, the fight was called off.

=== Final retirement ===
On August 16, 2017, Mosley announced his retirement after being a professional for 24 years. Speaking to ESPN, he said his body was no longer in a state where he could get through training due to a botched elbow surgery. In a statement, he said,

"I went in for a minor arthroscopic surgery to remove a couple loose bone fragments from my elbow and the surgery turned into a whole ordeal after the surgeon admittedly 'accidentally' burned me on my forearm, leading to a sick infection and needing like four or five days of IV antibiotics and two weeks of antibiotics at home. It was crazy and surreal to learn that I could never fight again."

He retired with 61 fights in the paid ranks. He won 49, with 41 coming inside the distance, 10 losses, having only been stopped once, 1 draw and a no contest.

== BALCO scandal ==
In August 2002 federal agents initiated investigations into BALCO, a California-based laboratory suspected of selling banned performance-enhancing drugs to top athletes. Shane Mosley was among those named as a BALCO client, and he testified before a grand jury that he injected himself with the endurance-boosting drug EPO and used undetectable steroids acquired from BALCO known as "the cream" and "the clear" – respectively testosterone cream and tetrahydrogestrinone (THG), a designer anabolic steroid – prior to his 2003 rematch with Oscar De La Hoya, which Mosley won by a unanimous decision. Mosley insisted that he did not knowingly take banned substances, and thought they were vitamins. He said he believed "the cream" was flaxseed oil, but under questioning he admitted it was probably something else. In 2008 Mosley launched a $12 million defamation lawsuit against BALCO founder Victor Conte, who claimed that Mosley knowingly took performance-enhancing drugs. The suit was dismissed with prejudice in November 2010.

== Personal life ==
In November 2002, Mosley married Jin Sheehan. The couple had three children before divorcing in 2010. He has a son, Shane Mosley Jr., from a previous relationship. Mosley Jr. made his professional debut in 2014.

== Professional boxing record ==
61 fights	49 wins	10 losses
By knockout	41	1
By decision	8	9
Draws	1	
No contests	1	

No.	Result	Record	Opponent	Type	Round, time	Date	Location	Notes
61	Loss	49–10–1 (1)	David Avanesyan	UD	12	May 28, 2016	Gila River Arena, Glendale, Arizona, U.S.	For WBA interim welterweight title
60	Win	49–9–1 (1)	Patrick López	TKO	10 (10), 2:00	Dec 17, 2015	Roberto Durán Arena, Panama City, Panama	Won vacant WBA Continental light middleweight title
59	Win	48–9–1 (1)	Ricardo Mayorga	KO	6 (12), 2:59	Aug 29, 2015	The Forum, Inglewood, California, U.S.	
58	Loss	47–9–1 (1)	Anthony Mundine	RTD	6 (12), 3:00	Nov 27, 2013	Allphones Arena, Sydney, Australia	For vacant WBA International light middleweight title
57	Win	47–8–1 (1)	Pablo César Cano	UD	12	May 18, 2013	Grand Oasis, Cancún, Mexico	Won vacant WBC International welterweight title
56	Loss	46–8–1 (1)	Canelo Álvarez	UD	12	May 5, 2012	MGM Grand Garden Arena, Paradise, Nevada, U.S.	For WBC light middleweight title
55	Loss	46–7–1 (1)	Manny Pacquiao	UD	12	May 7, 2011	MGM Grand Garden Arena, Paradise, Nevada, U.S.	For WBO welterweight title
54	Draw	46–6–1 (1)	Sergio Mora	SD	12	Sep 18, 2010	Staples Center, Los Angeles, California, U.S.	
53	Loss	46–6 (1)	Floyd Mayweather Jr.	UD	12	May 1, 2010	MGM Grand Garden Arena, Paradise, Nevada, U.S.	
52	Win	46–5 (1)	Antonio Margarito	TKO	9 (12), 0:43	Jan 24, 2009	Staples Center, Los Angeles, California, U.S.	Won WBA (Super) welterweight title
51	Win	45–5 (1)	Ricardo Mayorga	KO	12 (12), 2:59	Sep 27, 2008	Home Depot Center, Carson, California, U.S.	Won vacant WBA Inter-Continental light middleweight title
50	Loss	44–5 (1)	Miguel Cotto	UD	12	Nov 10, 2007	Madison Square Garden, New York City, New York, U.S.	For WBA welterweight title
49	Win	44–4 (1)	Luis Collazo	UD	12	Feb 10, 2007	MGM Grand Garden Arena, Paradise, Nevada, U.S.	Won WBC interim welterweight title
48	Win	43–4 (1)	Fernando Vargas	TKO	6 (12), 2:38	Jul 15, 2006	MGM Grand Garden Arena, Paradise, Nevada, U.S.	
47	Win	42–4 (1)	Fernando Vargas	TKO	10 (12), 1:22	Feb 25, 2006	Mandalay Bay Events Center, Paradise, Nevada, U.S.	
46	Win	41–4 (1)	José Luis Cruz	UD	10	Sep 17, 2005	MGM Grand Garden Arena, Paradise, Nevada, U.S.	
45	Win	40–4 (1)	David Estrada	UD	10	Apr 23, 2005	Caesars Palace, Paradise, Nevada, U.S.	
44	Loss	39–4 (1)	Winky Wright	MD	12	Nov 20, 2004	Mandalay Bay Events Center, Paradise, Nevada, U.S.	For WBA (Unified), WBC, and The Ring light middleweight titles
43	Loss	39–3 (1)	Winky Wright	UD	12	Mar 13, 2004	Mandalay Bay Events Center, Paradise, Nevada, U.S.	Lost WBA (Unified), WBC, and The Ring light middleweight titles; For IBF light middleweight title
42	Win	39–2 (1)	Oscar De La Hoya	UD	12	Sep 13, 2003	MGM Grand Garden Arena, Paradise, Nevada, U.S.	Won WBA (Unified), WBC, IBA, and The Ring light middleweight titles
41	NC	38–2 (1)	Raúl Márquez	NC	3 (12), 2:41	Feb 8, 2003	Mandalay Bay Events Center, Paradise, Nevada, U.S.	Márquez cut from an accidental head clash
40	Loss	38–2	Vernon Forrest	UD	12	Jul 20, 2002	Conseco Fieldhouse, Indianapolis, Indiana, U.S.	For WBC and The Ring welterweight titles
39	Loss	38–1	Vernon Forrest	UD	12	Jan 26, 2002	The Theater at Madison Square Garden, New York City, New York, U.S.	Lost WBC welterweight title; For vacant The Ring welterweight title
38	Win	38–0	Adrian Stone	TKO	3 (12), 2:01	Jul 21, 2001	Caesars Palace, Paradise, Nevada, U.S.	Retained WBC welterweight title
37	Win	37–0	Shannan Taylor	RTD	6 (12), 3:00	Mar 10, 2001	Caesars Palace, Paradise, Nevada, U.S.	Retained WBC welterweight title
36	Win	36–0	Antonio Díaz	TKO	6 (12), 1:36	Nov 4, 2000	The Theater at Madison Square Garden, New York City, New York, U.S.	Retained WBC welterweight title
35	Win	35–0	Oscar De La Hoya	SD	12	Jun 17, 2000	Staples Center, Los Angeles, California, U.S.	Won WBC and IBA welterweight titles
34	Win	34–0	Willy Wise	TKO	3 (10), 2:28	Jan 22, 2000	The Joint, Paradise, Nevada, U.S.	
33	Win	33–0	Wilfredo Rivera	KO	10 (10), 2:38	Sep 25, 1999	Pechanga Resort & Casino, Temecula, California, U.S.	
32	Win	32–0	John Brown	TKO	8 (12), 3:00	Apr 17, 1999	Fantasy Springs Resort Casino, Indio, California, U.S.	Retained IBF lightweight title
31	Win	31–0	Golden Johnson	KO	7 (12), 2:59	Jan 9, 1999	Civic Center, Pensacola, Florida, U.S.	Retained IBF lightweight title
30	Win	30–0	Jesse James Leija	RTD	9 (12), 3:00	Nov 14, 1998	Foxwoods Resort Casino, Ledyard, Connecticut, U.S.	Retained IBF lightweight title
29	Win	29–0	Eduardo Morales	TKO	5 (12), 2:06	Sep 22, 1998	The Theater at Madison Square Garden, New York City, New York, U.S.	Retained IBF lightweight title
28	Win	28–0	Wilfredo Ruiz	KO	5 (12), 2:32	Jun 27, 1998	Apollo Theatre, Philadelphia, Pennsylvania, U.S.	Retained IBF lightweight title
27	Win	27–0	John John Molina	TKO	8 (12), 2:27	May 9, 1998	Etess Arena, Atlantic City, New Jersey, U.S.	Retained IBF lightweight title
26	Win	26–0	Demetrio Ceballos	TKO	8 (12), 2:34	Feb 6, 1998	Mohegan Sun Arena, Montville, Connecticut, U.S.	Retained IBF lightweight title
25	Win	25–0	Manuel Gomez	KO	11 (12), 1:25	Nov 25, 1997	County Coliseum, El Paso, Texas, U.S.	Retained IBF lightweight title
24	Win	24–0	Philip Holiday	UD	12	Aug 2, 1997	Mohegan Sun Arena, Montville, Connecticut, U.S.	Won IBF lightweight title
23	Win	23–0	Michael Smith	KO	4 (10)	Apr 9, 1997	Inland Expo Center, Westmont, Illinois, U.S.	
22	Win	22–0	Elias Quiroz	KO	6 (10)	Feb 6, 1997	Beverly Hills, California, U.S.	
21	Win	21–0	Joseph Murray	TKO	3 (10)	Dec 21, 1996	Mohegan Sun Arena, Montville, Connecticut, U.S.	
20	Win	20–0	Ramon Felix	TKO	1 (10)	Nov 1, 1996	Fantasy Springs Resort Casino, Indio, California, U.S.	
19	Win	19–0	Mike Bryan	KO	1 (10)	Jan 23, 1996	Grand Casino, Biloxi, Mississippi, U.S.	
18	Win	18–0	Mauricio Aceves	KO	4 (10)	Jul 2, 1995	Arrowhead Pond, Anaheim, California, U.S.	
17	Win	17–0	Raul Hernandez	KO	2 (10)	Apr 12, 1995	Warner Center Marriott, Los Angeles, California, U.S.	
16	Win	16–0	Jose Luis Madrid	RTD	4 (10)	Nov 12, 1994	Civic Auditorium, Santa Cruz, California, U.S.	
15	Win	15–0	Louis Ramirez	TKO	10 (10), 0:45	Sep 9, 1994	Grand Olympic Auditorium, Los Angeles, California, U.S.	
14	Win	14–0	Mauro Gutierrez	TKO	9 (10), 1:10	Aug 6, 1994	Fairplex, Pomona, California, U.S.	
13	Win	13–0	Narciso Valenzuela	TKO	5 (10), 1:54	Jul 24, 1994	Grand Olympic Auditorium, Los Angeles, California, U.S.	
12	Win	12–0	John Bryant	KO	8 (10), 0:53	Jun 30, 1994	Marriott Hotel, Irvine, California, U.S.	
11	Win	11–0	Lorenzo Garcia	TKO	3 (10), 0:38	Apr 29, 1994	Civic Auditorium, Santa Cruz, California, U.S.	
10	Win	10–0	Oscar Lopez	PTS	10	Mar 26, 1994	Fairplex, Pomona, California, U.S.	
9	Win	9–0	Lorenzo Garcia	KO	5 (10)	Feb 4, 1994	Civic Auditorium, Santa Cruz, California, U.S.	
8	Win	8–0	Francisco Rodriguez	KO	2 (8), 2:40	Jan 20, 1994	Marriott Hotel, Irvine, California, U.S.	
7	Win	7–0	Paulino Gonzalez	KO	2 (8)	Dec 6, 1993	Great Western Forum, Inglewood, California, U.S.	
6	Win	6–0	Juan Manuel Aranda	KO	2 (8)	Oct 25, 1993	Great Western Forum, Inglewood, California, U.S.	
5	Win	5–0	Miguel Pena	KO	1 (8), 1:40	Sep 27, 1993	Great Western Forum, Inglewood, California, U.S.	
4	Win	4–0	Roberto Urias	KO	5 (6)	Aug 25, 1993	Hollywood Palladium, Hollywood, California, U.S.	
3	Win	3–0	Pey Castillo	KO	1 (6), 2:25	Jul 21, 1993	Reseda Country Club, Los Angeles, California, U.S.	
2	Win	2–0	Arnulfo Villa	KO	1 (6), 2:34	Apr 24, 1993	Great Western Forum, Inglewood, California, U.S.	
1	Win	1–0	Greg Puente	KO	5 (6), 1:09	Feb 11, 1993	Hollywood Palladium, Hollywood, California, U.S.	

== Exhibition boxing record ==
3 fights	2 wins	1 loss
By decision	2	1

No.	Result	Record	Opponent	Type	Round, time	Date	Location	Notes
3	Loss	2–1	Matt Floyd	UD	6	Jul 25, 2025	Indigo at the O2, London, England	
2	Win	2–0	Bob Kofroth	UD	5	Sep 28, 2024	The Event Center at Harrah's Resort, Chester, Pennsylvania, U.S.	
1	Win	1–0	Shaquille O'Neal	UD	5	Aug 10, 2010	Planet Hollywood Resort & Casino, Paradise, Nevada, U.S.	Scored by Shaq Vs. panel

== Titles in boxing ==
=== Major world titles ===
- IBF lightweight champion (135 lbs)
- WBA (Super) welterweight champion (147 lbs)
- WBC welterweight champion (147 lbs)
- WBA (Unified) light middleweight champion (154 lbs)
- WBC light middleweight champion (154 lbs)

=== The Ring magazine titles ===
- The Ring light middleweight champion (154 lbs)

=== Interim world titles ===
- WBC interim welterweight champion (147 lbs)

=== Minor world titles ===
- IBA welterweight champion (147 lbs)
- IBA light middleweight champion (154 lbs)

=== Regional/International titles ===
- WBC International welterweight champion (147 lbs)
- WBA Continental light middleweight champion (154 lbs)
- WBA Inter-Continental light middleweight champion (154 lbs)

== Pay-per-view bouts ==
No.	Date	Fight	Billing	Buys	Network
1	June 17, 2000	De La Hoya vs. Mosley	Destiny	590,000	HBO
2	September 13, 2003	De La Hoya vs. Mosley II	Redemption	950,000	HBO
3	November 10, 2007	Cotto vs. Mosley	Fast & Furious	400,000	HBO
4	May 1, 2010	Mayweather vs. Mosley	Who R U Picking?	1,400,000	HBO
5	May 7, 2011	Pacquiao vs. Mosley	The Undaunted	1,250,000	Showtime
		Total sales		4,590,000	

== See also ==
- List of lightweight boxing champions
- List of welterweight boxing champions
- List of light middleweight boxing champions
- List of boxing triple champions
- The Ring magazine Pound for Pound
- List of sportspeople sanctioned for doping offences
- Jung-Koo Chang

Sporting positions
Amateur boxing titles
Previous: Romallis Ellis	U.S. lightweight champion 1989, 1990	Next: Oscar De La Hoya
Previous: Vernon Forrest	U.S. light welterweight champion 1992	Next: Lupe Sauzo
Regional boxing titles
Vacant Title last held by Alex Bunema	WBA Inter-Continental light middleweight champion September 27, 2008 – January 24, 2009; Won world title	Vacant Title next held by Zaurbek Baysangurov
Vacant Title last held by Luis Abregú	WBC International welterweight champion May 18, 2013 – November 2013; Vacated	Vacant Title next held by Charles Manyuchi
Vacant Title last held by Liam Smith	WBA Continental (Europe) light middleweight champion December 17, 2015 – August 16, 2017; Retired	Vacant Title next held by Khuseyn Baysangurov
Minor world boxing titles
Preceded by Oscar De La Hoya	IBA welterweight champion June 17, 2000 – November 2000; Vacated	Vacant Title next held by Arturo Gatti
Preceded by Oscar De La Hoya	IBA light middleweight champion September 13, 2003 – March 2004; Vacated	Vacant Title next held by Yori Boy Campas
Major world boxing titles
Preceded by Philip Holiday	IBF lightweight champion August 2, 1997 – May 13, 1999; Vacated	Vacant Title next held by Paul Spadafora
Preceded by Oscar De La Hoya	WBC welterweight champion June 17, 2000 – January 26, 2002	Succeeded by Vernon Forrest
Preceded by Oscar De La Hoya	WBA light middleweight champion Super title September 13, 2003 – March 13, 2004	Succeeded by Winky Wright
Preceded by Oscar De La Hoya	WBC light middleweight champion September 13, 2003 – March 13, 2004	Succeeded by Winky Wright
Preceded by Oscar De La Hoya	The Ring light middleweight champion September 13, 2003 – March 13, 2004	Succeeded by Winky Wright
New title	WBC welterweight champion Interim title February 10, 2007 – November 2007; Vacated	Vacant Title next held by Robert Guerrero
Preceded by Antonio Margarito	WBA welterweight champion Super title January 24, 2009 – May 21, 2010; Stripped	Vacant Title next held by Keith Thurman
Awards
Previous: Evander Holyfield	BWAA Fighter of the Year; 1998	Next: Lennox Lewis
Achievements
Preceded by Roy Jones Jr.	The Ring pound for pound #1 boxer July 5, 2000 – January 27, 2002	Succeeded by Bernard Hopkins
