= Naazim Richardson =

American boxing trainer (died 2020)

Naazim Richardson (November 26, 1965 – July 24, 2020) was an American boxing trainer from Philadelphia. Richardson is most notable for training Bernard Hopkins and "Sugar" Shane Mosley, in addition to Steve Cunningham and Karl Dargan. He is also known for catching Antonio Margarito with plaster knuckle pads in his hand wraps prior to Margarito's fight with Mosley. This led to Margarito's one-year suspension from boxing.

== Early life ==
Richardson was raised in Philadelphia, Pennsylvania, and left home when he was 14. He was jailed as a teenager. According to The New York Times, "Boxing took Richardson from the streets that almost swallowed him in north Philadelphia, gave him energy and purpose." He was a head trainer in the Concrete Jungle in Philadelphia, and was also a trainer in several gyms across Philadelphia. Richardson worked under Bouie Fisher for a while. His son Rock Allen was a boxer prior to a car accident.

== Career ==
A devout Muslim, Richardson was often acknowledged as "Brother" Naazim. In 2007, Richardson suffered a stroke that temporarily left him unable to walk or speak.

After returning to boxing, Richardson became "Sugar" Shane Mosley's trainer for three major fights: his win over Antonio Margarito and his losses to Floyd Mayweather Jr. and Manny Pacquiao.

== Notable fighters trained or advised by Richardson ==
- Bernard Hopkins
- Shane Mosley
- Karl Dargan (nephew of Naazim Richardson)
- Badr Hari
- Yusaf Mack (worked the corner)
- Matt Godfrey
- Sergio Martinez (corner adviser for fight vs. Julio César Chávez Jr.)
- Steve Cunningham
