= North American Boxing Council =

NABC logo mark

The North American Boxing Council is a professional Boxing and Mixed Martial Arts sanctioning body headquartered in the United States at Indianapolis, IN since 1999.

NABC boxing champions have been televised on HBO Boxing, Friday Night Fights and Fox Sports. Boxers who have contested for the title include Evander Holyfield, Félix Trinidad, Larry Donald, Ricardo Mayorga, Stevie Johnston, Joshua Clottey, Ian Gardner, Brian Mihtar, and Damian Fuller. Promoters who have held NABC contests include Don King, Fred Berns, and Gary Shaw.

In 2014 the NABC adopted the Ring Magazine model of recognizing champions based won/loss record, quality of performance, strength of opposition, and computerized rankings, to fill vacant titles. The NABC recognizes the Ring Magazine champion as world champion.

== Mixed martial arts ==
On July 28, 2006, the NABC became the first professional boxing sanctioning body to sanction a Mixed Martial Arts bout when Jessie Chilton defeated Eddie Sanchez at Legends of Fighting 8 in Indianapolis to win the NABC 185 lb MMA championship.

The NABC has produced its own MMA cards as NABC Extreme Fighting. NABC mixed martial arts champions have been televised on the HDNet cable channel and on Cage Fury Fighting Championships pay per view broadcasts.

NABC sanctioning of MMA matches and the implications for the future of professional boxing were examined in an NBC Sports story by Kenny Rice May 29, 2007.

== See also ==
- List of NABC champions
