= Boxing career of Manny Pacquiao =

Manny Pacquiao
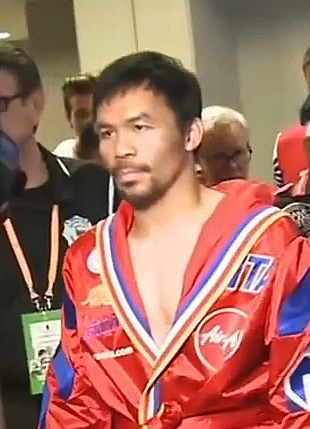
- Pacquiao making his ring entrance for his fight against Keith Thurman, 2019

Personal information
- Nickname: PacMan
- Born: December 17, 1978 (age 47) Kibawe, Bukidnon, Philippines
- Height: 5 ft 5 1/2 in (166 cm)
- Weight: Flyweight; Super bantamweight; Featherweight; Super featherweight; Lightweight; Light welterweight; Welterweight; Light middleweight

Boxing career
- Reach: 67 in (170 cm)
- Stance: Southpaw

Boxing record
- Total fights: 73
- Wins: 62
- Win by KO: 39
- Losses: 8
- Draws: 3

Manny Pacquiao has competed in professional boxing from 1995. Regarded by boxing historians as one of the greatest professional boxers of all time, Pacquiao is the only boxer in history to win twelve world titles in eight different weight divisions. He won the lineal championship in four different weight classes (flyweight, featherweight, super featherweight, light welterweight), and is the only boxer in history to win major world titles in four of the original eight weight divisions of boxing, also known as the "glamour divisions": flyweight, featherweight, lightweight, and welterweight. In June 2025, Pacquiao was inducted into the International Boxing Hall of Fame, becoming the third Filipino boxer to receive the honor, joining Gabriel Elorde (1993) and Pancho Villa (1994).

In July 2019, Pacquiao became the oldest welterweight world champion in history at the age of 40, and the first boxer to become a recognized four-time welterweight champion after defeating Keith Thurman to win the WBA (Super) welterweight title. Pacquiao also holds the record of being the only boxer to hold world titles in four different decades, in the 1990s, 2000s, 2010s, and 2020s.

He was named Fighter of the Decade for the 2000s by the Boxing Writers Association of America (BWAA), World Boxing Council (WBC), World Boxing Organization (WBO), The Sporting News and HBO. He is also a three-time The Ring, ESPN, and BWAA Fighter of the Year, winning the award in 2006, 2008 and 2009, and a two-time Best Fighter ESPY Award winner in 2009 and 2011. In 2016, Pacquiao was ranked second on ESPN's list of top boxers, pound-for-pound, of the past 25 years. In 2024, they ranked him second among the best boxers of the 21st century. In 2025, The Ring also ranked Pacquiao second among the greatest pound-for-pound boxers of the 21st century.

Boxing historian Bert Sugar ranked Pacquiao as the greatest southpaw fighter of all time. Spanish media outlet Marca placed Pacquiao 16th on their Greatest Sportsmen of the 21st Century list. In 2021, Pacquiao held the top spot in DAZN's list of the top 10 boxers of the previous 30 years and as of 2022, he was ranked ninth in The Ring's list of the top 100 boxers of all time. As of April 2025, BoxRec ranks Pacquiao as the greatest Asian professional boxer of all time. In 2025, he was also awarded the WBC's Fighter of the Century honor, becoming—alongside Sugar Ray Robinson—the only boxer to have won the "triple crown" of legacy awards: Fighter of the Year, Fighter of the Decade, and Fighter of the Century.

Pacquiao was long rated as the best active boxer in the world, pound-for-pound, by most sporting news and boxing websites, including ESPN, Sports Illustrated, Sporting Life, Yahoo! Sports, About.com, BoxRec and The Ring, beginning from his climb to lightweight until his losses at welterweight in 2012. He was also the longest reigning top-ten active boxer on The Ring's pound-for-pound list.

Pacquiao has generated approximately 20.4 million total pay-per-view (PPV) buys and $1.29 billion in revenue from his 26 PPV bouts. His highly anticipated bout against Floyd Mayweather Jr. is the highest grossing PPV event in history, generating a record-breaking 4.6 million buys. According to Forbes, he was the second highest paid athlete in the world in 2015.

== Amateur career ==
At the age of 14, Pacquiao moved to Manila and lived for a time on the streets. He started boxing while working as construction worker and enduring hunger just to send money to his mother and made the Philippine national amateur boxing team where his room and board were paid for by the government. Pacquiao reportedly had an amateur record of 60 wins and 4 losses.

== Professional career ==
In 1995, the death of a young aspiring boxer and close friend, Eugene Barutag, spurred the young Pacquiao to pursue a professional boxing career. Pacquiao started his professional boxing career when he was just 16 years old, stood at 4'11'' and weighed 98 pounds (7 pounds under the mini-flyweight division). He admitted before American media that he put weights in his pockets to make the 105-pound weight limit. His early fights took place in small local venues and were shown on Vintage Sports' Blow by Blow, an evening boxing show. His professional debut was a four-round bout against Edmund "Enting" Ignacio, on January 22, 1995. Weighing just 106 pounds, Pacquiao won via unanimous decision, becoming an instant star of the program. Pacquiao's name was so accustomed to the viewers not only because of his aggressive, go-for-broke kamikaze-style of fighting, but also of his unique looks and catchy surname.

=== Flyweight ===
After his first four fights—all at light flyweight—Pacquiao's weight increased from 106 to 113 pounds. He suffered his first loss in his twelfth bout against Rustico Torrecampo via third-round knockout. He was caught with a looping left hand flush on the chin which he couldn't get up from. Pacquiao failed to make the required weight, so he was forced to use heavier gloves than Torrecampo, thereby putting him at a disadvantage.

Following the Torrecampo fight, Pacquiao continued undefeated for his next fifteen fights. He went on another unbeaten run that saw him take on the more experienced Chokchai Chockvivat in the flyweight division. Pacquiao knocked out Chockvivat in the fifth round and took the OPBF flyweight title. After one official defense and two non-title bouts, Pacquiao got his first opportunity to fight for a world title.

==== Pacquiao vs. Sasakul ====
Pacquiao captured the WBC and lineal flyweight titles (his first major boxing world title) over Chatchai Sasakul by way of knockout in the eighth round. He defended the titles successfully against Mexican Gabriel Mira via a fourth-round technical knockout. However, Pacquiao lost the lineal title in his second defense against Medgoen Singsurat, also known as Medgoen 3K Battery, via third-round knockout. The bout was held in Nakhon Si Thammarat, Thailand. Singsurat got Pacquiao on the ropes and landed a flush straight right to the body, coiling Pacquiao over and keeping him there. Prior to the fight, Pacquiao lost the WBC title at the scales as he surpassed the weight limit of 112 pounds.

=== Super bantamweight ===
Following his loss to Singsurat, Pacquiao gained weight and skipped the super flyweight and bantamweight divisions. This time, Pacquiao went to super bantamweight division of 122 pounds, where he picked up the WBC International super bantamweight title. He defended this title five times before his chance for a world title fight came.

==== Pacquiao vs. Ledwaba ====
Pacquiao's big break came on June 23, 2001, against IBF super bantamweight title holder Lehlohonolo Ledwaba. Pacquiao stepped into the fight as a late replacement on two weeks' notice but won the fight by technical knockout to win the title, his second major boxing world title. The bout was held at the MGM Grand Garden Arena, in Paradise, Nevada. Pacquiao went on to defend this title four times under head trainer Freddie Roach, owner of the Wild Card Gym in West Hollywood.

==== Pacquiao vs. Sanchez ====
Pacquiao faced Agapito Sánchez in a unification match on November 10, 2001, at the Bill Graham Civic Auditorium in San Francisco, California as the main supporting bout of Floyd Mayweather Jr. vs. Jesús Chávez. This marks both Mayweather and Pacquiao first appearance together in the same fight card. The bout ended in the sixth round under the recommendation of the ringside physician to stop the fight as Pacquiao was unfit to continue due to the cuts inflicted by Sanchez's repeated headbutts. The bout was ruled a split draw.

==== Pacquiao vs. Julio ====
Pacquiao knocked out Jorge Eliecer Julio in the second round on June 8, 2002, at The Pyramid in Memphis, Tennessee as the main supporting bout of Lennox Lewis vs. Mike Tyson fight. This marks Pacquiao's first appearance in a joint HBO and Showtime fight card.

=== Featherweight ===
==== Pacquiao vs. Barrera ====
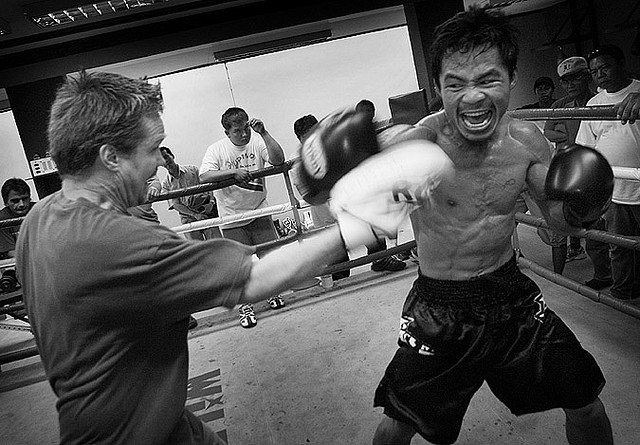
Pacquiao with his trainer Freddie Roach, 2004

On November 15, 2003, Pacquiao faced Marco Antonio Barrera at the Alamodome, San Antonio, Texas, in a fight that many consider to have defined his career. In spite of Barrera being given credit for knocking Pacquiao down in the first round (as replays showed the punch missed), Pacquiao, who was fighting at featherweight for the first time, brought his power with him and defeated Barrera via technical knockout in the eleventh round. This was the only loss in Barrera's professional career to have come officially via stoppage inside the distance. With the victory, Pacquiao won The Ring and lineal featherweight championships, making him the first Filipino and Asian to become a three-division world champion, a fighter who won world titles in three different weight divisions. He defended the title twice before relinquishing it in 2005.

On November 24, 2003, the then Philippine President Gloria Macapagal Arroyo conferred on Pacquiao the Presidential Medal of Merit at the Ceremonial Hall of Malacañang Palace for his knockout victory over the best featherweight boxer in the world. The following day, the members of the House of Representatives of the Philippines presented the House Resolution No. 765, authored by the then House Speaker Jose De Venecia and Bukidnon Representative Migz Zubiri, which honored Pacquiao the Congressional Medal of Achievement for his exceptional achievements. Pacquiao is the first sportsman to receive such an honor from the House of Representatives.

==== Pacquiao vs. Márquez ====
Six months after the fight with Barrera, Pacquiao challenged Juan Manuel Márquez, who at the time held both the WBA and IBF featherweight titles. The fight took place at the MGM Grand Garden Arena, Las Vegas, on May 8, 2004.

In the first round, Márquez was caught cold, as he was knocked down three times by Pacquiao. However, Márquez showed great heart to recover from the early knockdowns and went on to win the majority of rounds thereafter. This was largely due to Márquez's counterpunch style, which he managed to effectively use against the aggressive style of Pacquiao. At the end of a very close fight, both boxers felt they had done enough to win the fight. The bout was scored a draw, which proved to be a controversial decision. The final scores were 115–110 for Márquez, 115–110 for Pacquiao, and 113–113. The judge who scored the bout 113–113 admitted to making an error on the scorecards, having scored the first round as 10–7 in favor of Pacquiao instead of the standard 10–6 for a three-knockdown round. If he had scored the round 10–6 for Pacquiao (as the other two judges did), the result would have been a split decision in favor of Pacquiao. However, ESPN reported that some pundits have also scored the fight in favor of Márquez.

=== Super featherweight ===
==== Pacquiao vs. Morales ====
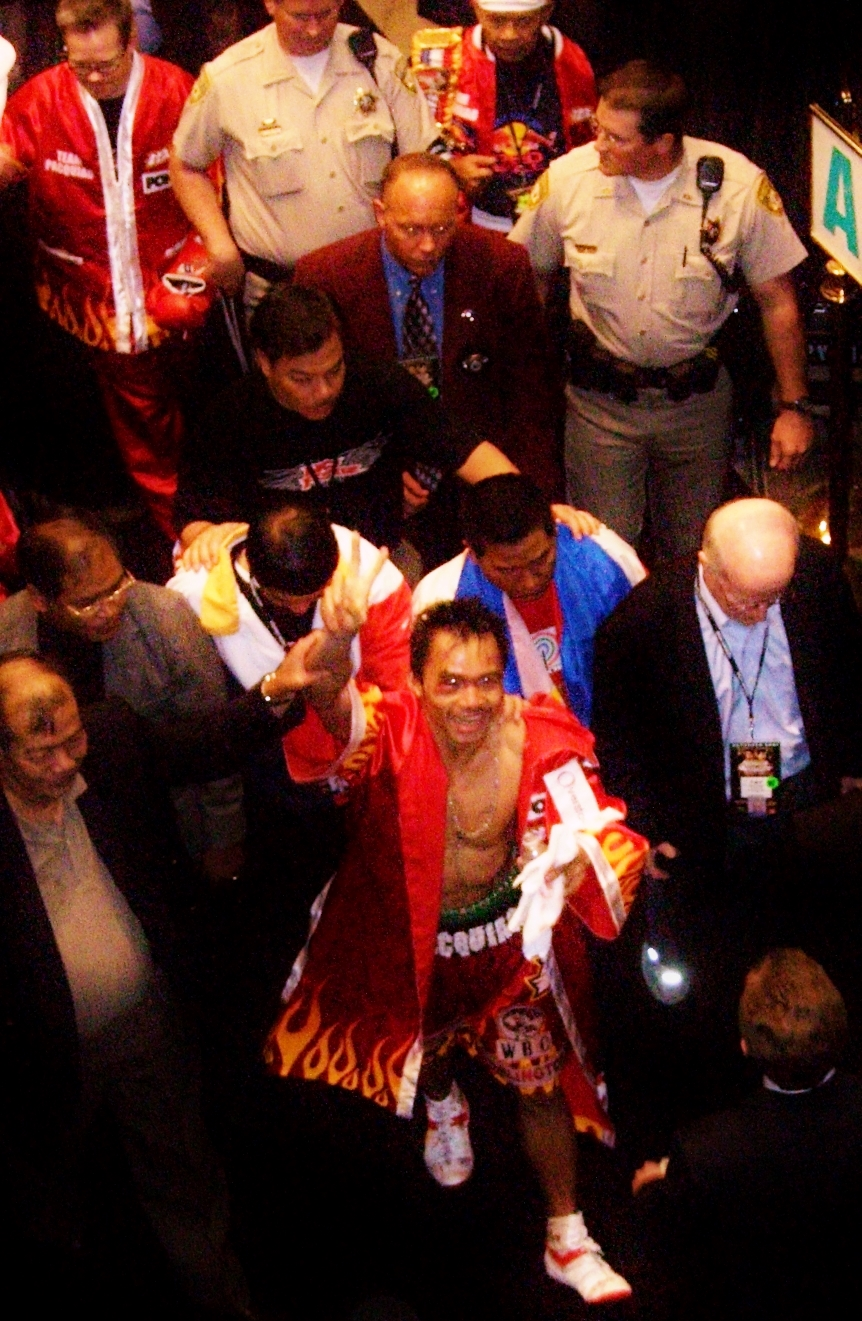
Pacquiao leaving the ring after his first fight against Érik Morales, 2005

On March 19, 2005, Pacquiao moved up to the super featherweight division of 130 pounds to fight another Mexican legend and three-division world champion Érik Morales, for the vacant WBC International and vacant IBA super featherweight titles. The fight took place at the MGM Grand Garden Arena, Las Vegas. In this fight, Pacquiao sustained a cut over his right eye from an accidental clash of heads in the fifth round. He lost the twelve-round match by a unanimous decision from the judges. All three scorecards read 115–113 for Morales.

On September 10, 2005, Pacquiao knocked Héctor Velázquez out in six rounds at Staples Center in Los Angeles to capture the WBC International super featherweight title, which he went on to defend five times. On the same card, his rival Morales fought Zahir Raheem and lost via unanimous decision in the main event.

==== Pacquiao vs. Morales II ====
Despite Morales' loss to Raheem, Pacquiao got matched up against him in a rematch which took place on January 21, 2006, at the Thomas & Mack Center in Las Vegas. During the fight, Morales escaped being knocked down twice, once in the second round by holding onto the ropes and once in the sixth by falling on the referee. Pacquiao eventually stopped Morales in the tenth with a TKO, the first time Morales was stopped in his boxing career.

==== Pacquiao vs. Larios ====
On July 2, 2006, Pacquiao defended his WBC International title against Óscar Larios, a two-time super bantamweight champion who had moved up two weight divisions to fight Pacquiao. Pacquiao won the fight via unanimous decision, knocking down Larios two times in the twelve-round bout at the Araneta Coliseum in Quezon City, Philippines. The three judges respectively scored the fight 117–110, 118–108, and 120–106.

On July 3, 2006, the day after winning the fight against Larios, President Gloria Macapagal Arroyo personally bestowed the Order of Lakandula with the rank of "Champion for Life" (Kampeon Habambuhay) and the plaque of appreciation upon Pacquiao in a simple ceremony at the Presidential Study of Malacañang Palace.

==== Pacquiao vs. Morales III ====
Pacquiao and Morales fought a third time (with the series tied 1–1) on November 18, 2006. Witnessed by a near-record crowd of 18,276, the match saw Pacquiao defeat Morales via a third-round knockout at the Thomas & Mack Center in Las Vegas. After the Pacquiao–Morales rubber match, Bob Arum, Pacquiao's main promoter, announced that Manny had returned his signing bonus back to Golden Boy Promotions, signaling intentions to stay with Top Rank. This prompted Golden Boy Promotions to sue Pacquiao over breach of contract.

==== Pacquiao vs. Solís ====
After a failed promotional negotiation with Marco Antonio Barrera's camp, Bob Arum chose Jorge Solís as Pacquiao's next opponent among several fighters Arum offered as replacements. The bout was held in San Antonio, Texas, on April 14, 2007. In the sixth round, an accidental headbutt occurred, giving Pacquiao a cut under his left eyebrow. The fight ended in the eighth when Pacquiao knocked Solís down twice. Solís barely beat the count after the second knockdown, causing the referee to stop the fight and award Pacquiao a knockout win. The victory raised Pacquiao's win–loss–draw record to 44–3–2 with 34 knockouts. This also marked the end of Solís's undefeated streak.

==== Pacquiao vs. Barrera II ====
On June 29, 2007, Top Rank and Golden Boy Promotions announced that they agreed to settle their lawsuit, meaning the long-awaited rematch with Marco Antonio Barrera would occur despite Pacquiao being the top-ranked contender for Juan Manuel Márquez's WBC super featherweight title. On October 6, 2007, Pacquiao defeated Barrera in their rematch via an easy unanimous decision. In the eleventh round, Pacquiao's punch caused a deep cut below Barrera's right eye. Barrera retaliated with an illegal punch on the break that dazed Pacquiao, but also resulted in a point deduction for Barrera. Two judges scored the bout 118–109, whereas the third scored it 115–112.

In The Ring magazine, Pacquiao (45–3–2) remained at the top of the super featherweight division (130 pounds). He had been in the ratings for 108 weeks. On November 13, 2007, he was honored by the World Boxing Council as Emeritus Champion during its 45th Annual World Convention held at the Manila Hotel.

On November 20, 2007, José Nuñez, manager of WBO super featherweight champion Joan Guzmán, accused Pacquiao's handler Bob Arum of evading a match between the two boxers to protect Pacquiao. Guzmán went as far as to directly call out Pacquiao at the post-fight press conference of the Pacquiao–Barrera rematch in front of the crowd at the Mandalay Bay Events Center's media room in Las Vegas.

==== Pacquiao vs. Márquez II ====
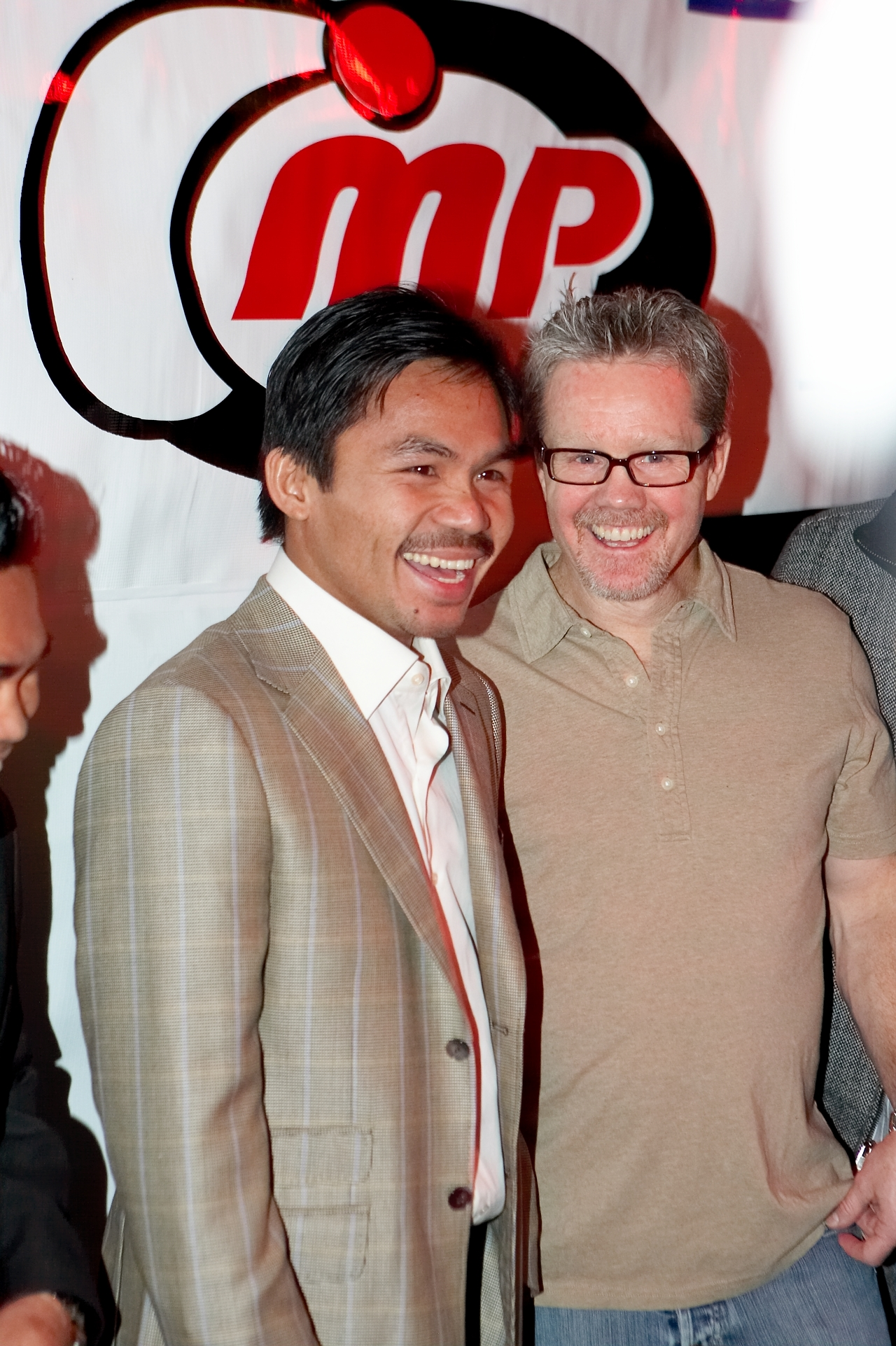
Pacquiao and Roach at Pacquiao's Christmas and birthday bash, 2008

On March 15, 2008, in a rematch against Juan Manuel Márquez, called "Unfinished Business," Pacquiao won via split decision. The fight was held at the Mandalay Bay Resort and Casino in Las Vegas. With the victory, Pacquiao won the WBC, The Ring and lineal super featherweight titles, making him the first Filipino and Asian to become a four-division world champion, a fighter who won world titles in four different weight divisions. The fight was a close, hard-fought battle, during which both fighters received cuts. Throughout the fight, Márquez landed the most punches at a higher percentage; however, the decisive factor proved to be a third-round knockdown, wherein Márquez was floored by a Pacquiao left hook. At the end of the fight, the judges' scores were 115–112 for Pacquiao, 115–112 for Márquez, and 114–113 for Pacquiao.

In the post-fight news conference, Márquez's camp called for an immediate rematch. In addition, Richard Schaefer, Golden Boy Promotions CEO, offered a $6 million guarantee to Pacquiao for a rematch. However, Pacquiao ruled out a third clash with Márquez, saying, "I don't think so. This business is over." The reason that Pacquiao did not want a rematch was because he intended to move up to the lightweight division to challenge David Díaz, the reigning WBC lightweight title holder at that time. Díaz won a majority decision over Ramón Montano that night as an undercard of the "Unfinished Business" fight.

=== Lightweight ===
==== Pacquiao vs. Díaz ====
On June 28, 2008, at the Mandalay Bay Resort and Casino in Las Vegas, Pacquiao moved to the lightweight division and claimed the WBC lightweight title, defeating David Díaz via knockout in round nine. With the victory, Pacquiao became the first and only Filipino and Asian to become a five-division world champion, a fighter who won world titles in five different weight divisions. He also became the first Filipino fighter to ever win a world title at lightweight. During the fight, which Pacquiao dominated, Díaz was cut badly on his right eye in the fourth round. After the bout, Díaz acknowledged Pacquiao's superior hand speed, stating "It was his speed. It was all his speed. I could see the punches perfectly, but he was just too fast."

Bob Arum reported that the fight had made $12.5 million, earning Díaz his best payday of $850,000, whilst Pacquiao earned at least $3 million. Official records revealed an attendance of 8,362 (out of a maximum capacity of 12,000).

Holding both the WBC super featherweight and lightweight titles following the win, Pacquiao decided to vacate his super featherweight title in July 2008.

On August 7, 2008, the members of the House of Representatives of the Philippines issued a House Resolution, sponsored by South Cotabato Congresswoman Darlene Antonino-Custodio, which recognized Pacquiao as a "People's Champ" — "for his achievements and in appreciation of the honor and inspiration he has been bringing... to the Filipino people." He received a plaque from the then House Speaker Prospero Nograles.

=== Welterweight ===
==== Pacquiao vs. De La Hoya ====
On December 6, 2008, Pacquiao moved up to the welterweight division to face the six-division world champion Oscar De La Hoya at the MGM Grand Garden Arena, in a fight called "The Dream Match". Presented by Golden Boy Promotions and Top Rank, the bout was scheduled as a twelve-round, non-title fight contested at the 147-pound welterweight limit. Although Pacquiao went into the fight widely recognized as the leading pound-for-pound boxer in the world, some boxing pundits had speculated that 147 pounds could be too far above his natural weight against the larger De La Hoya. However, due to rehydration after the weigh in, De La Hoya came into the fight actually weighing less than Pacquiao and close to 20 pounds under his usual fighting weight. Pacquiao dominated the fight and, after eight rounds, De La Hoya's corner was forced to throw in the towel, awarding Pacquiao the win via technical knockout.

Pacquiao was ahead on all three judges' scorecards before the stoppage, with two judges scoring the fight at 80–71 and one scoring it at 79–72. Moreover, Pacquiao landed 224 out of 585 punches, whilst De La Hoya landed only 83 out of 402 punches. After the bout, trainer Freddie Roach stated, "We knew we had him after the first round. He had no legs, he was hesitant and he was shot." The fight would be De La Hoya's last, as he announced his retirement from boxing shortly after.

Pacquiao received 15 to $30 million (share of the pay-per-view), plus a guaranteed amount. Tickets reportedly sold out just hours after they went on sale. Moreover, the total gate revenue for the fight was said to be nearly $17 million, making it the second-largest gate revenue in boxing history.

On December 22, 2008, Pacquiao was decorated with the Philippine Legion of Honor with the rank of "Officer" (Pinuno) in a ceremony marking the 73rd founding anniversary of the Armed Forces of the Philippines. As an army reservist, he was given recognition for bringing pride and honor to the country through his remarkable achievements in the ring.

=== Light welterweight ===
==== Pacquiao vs. Hatton ====
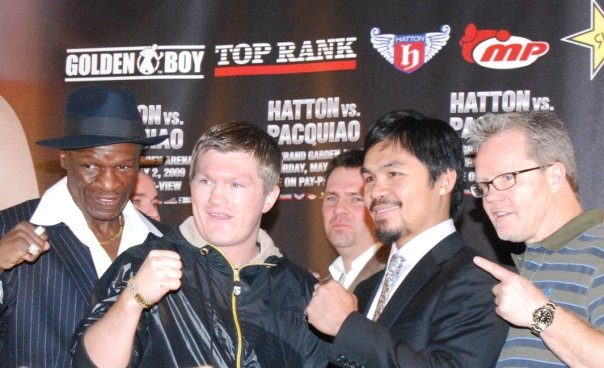
Left to right: Floyd Mayweather Sr., Ricky Hatton, Pacquiao, and Roach at the Trafford Centre, 2009

On May 2, 2009, Pacquiao fought at light welterweight for the first time against Ricky Hatton at the MGM Grand Garden Arena, in a fight billed as "The Battle of the East and West." Pacquiao won the bout via knockout to claim Hatton's IBO, The Ring and lineal light welterweight titles. In doing so, Pacquiao became the second man in boxing history to become a six-division world champion, a fighter who won world titles in six different weight divisions and the first man ever to win lineal world titles in four different weight classes.

The fight was originally placed in jeopardy due to disputes with both camps over the fight purse money. Eventually, the money issue was settled and the fight went on as scheduled. HBO aired the contest.

Pacquiao started the fight strong, knocking down Hatton twice in the first round. A somewhat shaken Hatton beat the count, only to be saved by the bell seconds later. In the second round, Hatton seemed to have recovered, as he stalked Pacquiao for most of the round. However, with less than ten seconds remaining in the round, Hatton was knocked out cold by a sharp left hook, prompting the referee to award Pacquiao the win by knockout at 2:59.

The knockout won him The Ring magazine "Knockout of the Year" for 2009.

=== Return to welterweight ===
==== Pacquiao vs. Cotto ====
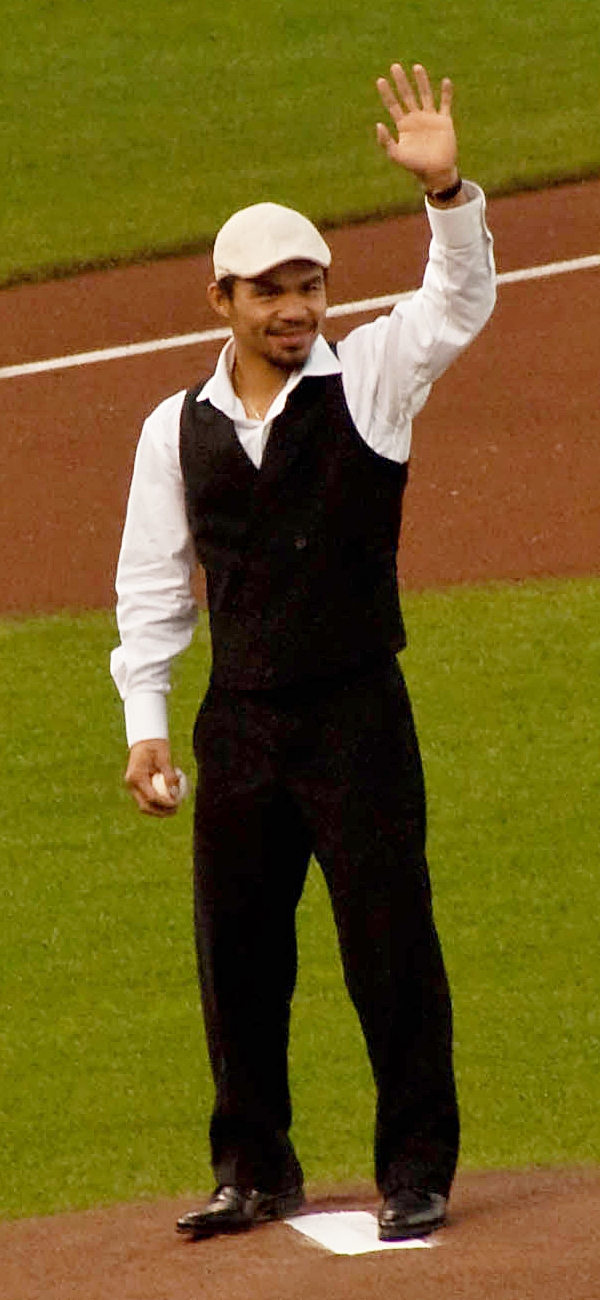
Pacquiao at AT&T Park, 2009

On November 14, 2009, Pacquiao defeated Miguel Cotto via technical knockout in the twelfth round at the MGM Grand Garden Arena, in a fight billed as "Firepower." Although the bout was sanctioned as a world title fight in the welterweight division, where the weight limit is 147 pounds, Cotto agreed to fight at a catchweight of 145 pounds.

Pacquiao dominated the fight, knocking Cotto down in round three and round four, before the referee stopped the fight at 0:55 of round twelve. With this victory, Pacquiao took the WBO welterweight title, was awarded the WBO super championship title and became the first seven-division world champion, the first fighter in boxing history to win world titles in seven different weight divisions, as well as the first boxer in history to win major world titles in four of the eight "glamour divisions" of boxing (flyweight, featherweight, lightweight and welterweight). Pacquiao also won the first and special WBC diamond championship belt. This belt was created as an honorary championship exclusively to award the winner of a historic fight between two high-profile boxers. After the fight, promoter Bob Arum stated "Pacquiao is the greatest boxer I've ever seen, and I've seen them all, including Ali, Hagler and Sugar Ray Leonard." Cotto said in a post-fight interview: "Miguel Cotto comes to boxing to fight the biggest names, and Manny is one of the best boxers we have of all time."

The fight generated 1.25 million buys and $70 million in domestic pay-per-view revenue, making it the most watched boxing event of 2009. Pacquiao earned around $22 million for his part in the fight, whilst Cotto earned around $12 million. Pacquiao–Cotto also generated a live gate of $8,847,550 from an official crowd of 15,930.

On November 20, 2009, in a simple rites at the Quirino Grandstand, President Macapagal-Arroyo conferred Pacquiao the Order of Sikatuna with the rank of Datu (Grand Cross) with Gold distinction (Katangiang Ginto) which usually bestowed upon foreign diplomats and heads of state. It was awarded to Pacquiao for winning his historical seventh weight division world title.

==== Negotiations with Mayweather Jr. ====
Following the victory against Cotto, there was much public demand for a fight between Pacquiao (the number-one pound-for-pound boxer) and the five-division world champion Floyd Mayweather Jr. (the number-two and former number-one pound-for-pound boxer). Pacquiao reportedly agreed to fight Mayweather on March 13, 2010, for a split of $50 million up front and it was later agreed that the venue for the fight would be the MGM Grand Garden Arena. However, the bout was put in jeopardy due to disagreements about Olympic-style drug testing. The Mayweather camp wanted random blood testing by the United States Anti-Doping Agency (USADA), whereas Pacquiao refused to have any blood testing within 30 days from the fight, because he thought it would weaken him, but he was willing to have blood taken from him before the 30-day window as well as immediately after the fight. Freddie Roach, on the other hand, commented that he would not allow blood to be taken from Pacquiao one week before the fight. In an attempt to resolve their differences, the two camps went through a process of mediation before a retired judge. After the mediation process Mayweather agreed to a 14-day no blood testing window. However, Pacquiao refused and instead only agreed to a 24-day no blood testing window. Consequently, on January 6, 2010, Pacquiao's promoter Bob Arum declared that the fight was officially off.

Because of Pacquiao's reluctance to submit to random blood testing to the extent requested by Mayweather, despite lack of evidence, the Mayweather camp repeated their suggestion that Pacquiao was using banned substances, which resulted in Pacquiao filing a lawsuit for defamation, seeking damages in excess of $75,000. The lawsuit cited accusations made by Floyd Mayweather Jr., Floyd Mayweather Sr., Roger Mayweather, Oscar De La Hoya and Golden Boy Promotions CEO Richard Schaefer.

After negotiations for the Mayweather fight fell through, other boxers were considered to replace Mayweather as Pacquiao's next opponent, including former light welterweight champion Paulie Malignaggi and WBA super welterweight title holder Yuri Foreman. However, Pacquiao chose to fight former IBF welterweight title holder Joshua Clottey instead.

==== Pacquiao vs. Clottey ====
On March 13, 2010, at the Cowboys Stadium in Arlington, Texas, Pacquiao defeated Clottey via unanimous decision to retain his WBO welterweight title. The judges scored the fight 120–108, 119–109, and 119–109, all in favor of Pacquiao. During the fight, Pacquiao threw a total of 1231 punches (a career high), but landed just 246, as most were blocked by Clottey's tight defense. On the other hand, Clottey threw a total of 399 punches, landing 108.

The fight was rewarded with a paid crowd of 36,371 and a gate of $6,359,985, according to post-fight tax reports filed with Texas boxing regulators. Counting complimentary tickets delivered to sponsors, media outlets and others, the Dallas fight attracted 41,843, well short of the 50,994 that was previously announced, but still an epic number for boxing. In addition, the bout drew 700,000 pay-per-view buys and earned $35.3 million in domestic revenue.

Pacquiao was named as the Fighter of the Decade for years 2000–2009 by the Boxing Writers Association of America (BWAA). This award was presented by legendary boxer Joe Frazier, who was also a recipient of the award himself back in 1978 for defeating Muhammad Ali. Aside from this prestigious recognition, he was also named as the Sugar Ray Robinson Fighter of the Year for 2009, having received the same honor in 2006 and 2008. The awards ceremony was held at the Roosevelt Hotel in New York City on June 4, 2010.

After his victory over Clottey, Pacquiao was expected to return to boxing in late 2010 with a possible matchup against Floyd Mayweather Jr.. It was later reported that Golden Boy Promotions CEO Richard Schaefer and Top Rank Chief Bob Arum worked out a "super fight" between Manny Pacquiao and Floyd Mayweather Jr.. However, complications arose when Mayweather requested Pacquiao undergo random blood and urine testing up until the fight day. Pacquiao responded that he would agree to undergo blood and urine testing up until 14 days before the fight (as requested by Mayweather in the first round of negotiations), stating that giving blood too close to the fight day would weaken him. On May 13, 2010, Pacquiao's promoter Bob Arum announced that he had penciled on November 13, 2010, as the date of Manny Pacquiao's next fight, possibly against Mayweather. However, the stumbling block over demands that Pacquiao submit to Olympic-level random drug testing put the fight in jeopardy.

On June 12, 2010, the President of Golden Boy Promotions, Oscar De La Hoya, stated during an interview with Univision that the deal for the fight was very close and the negotiation process has been very difficult. On June 30, 2010, Arum announced that the management of both sides had agreed to terms, that all points had been settled (including Pacquiao agreeing to submit to both blood and urine testing) and only the signature of Floyd Mayweather Jr. was needed to seal the deal that could have earned both fighters at least $40 million each. Mayweather was then given a two-week deadline for the fight contract to be signed. Arum also announced that Pacquiao accepted the terms of the random drug testing, blood and urine, leading up to the fight.

On July 15, 2010, Bob Arum announced that Pacquiao's camp would give Mayweather until Friday midnight to sign the fight. The next day, the Top Rank website embedded a countdown clock on their website with the heading "Money" Time: Mayweather's Decision. On July 17, 2010, Arum announced that there was no word from Mayweather's camp and the deal for a November 13, 2010, fight with Mayweather was not reached.

On July 19, 2010, Leonard Ellerbe, one of Floyd Mayweather Jr.'s closest advisers, denied that negotiations for a super fight between Mayweather and Pacquiao had ever taken place. Ellerbe stated that Bob Arum was not telling the truth. Bob Arum responded, questioning that if there was no negotiation, then who imposed the gag order (referring to a gag order about the negotiation allegedly imposed on both camps) and who could there be a gag order from if there were no negotiations. He also criticized Oscar De La Hoya and his Golden Boy Promotions CEO Richard Schaefer for denying that negotiations took place, when De La Hoya himself had previously stated that they were "very, very close in finalizing the contracts." Arum revealed that HBO Sports President Ross Greenburg acted as the mediator between Mayweather's handlers and those of Pacquiao's from Top Rank Promotions.

On July 26, 2010, Ross Greenburg said that he has been negotiating with a representative from each side since May 2, 2010, carefully trying to put the fight together and he did in fact act as a go-between in negotiations with the two sides, but they were unable to come to an agreement, contradicting what Arum and the Pacquiao camp had said. Floyd Mayweather Jr., after the second negotiation had been officially declared off, told the Associated Press that he had fought sixty days ago and that he was not interested in rushing into anything and was not really thinking about boxing at the moment.

=== Light middleweight ===
==== Pacquiao vs. Margarito ====
On July 23, 2010, Bob Arum announced that Pacquiao would fight Antonio Margarito on November 13, 2010. The fight for the vacant WBC super welterweight title gave Pacquiao the chance to win a world title in his eighth weight class, the super welterweight division. A catchweight of 150 pounds was established for the fight, although the weight limit for the super welterweight division is 154 pounds. During the pre-fight, Pacquiao weighed in at a low 144.6 pounds, while Margarito weighed in at the limit of 150 pounds. Pacquiao said he was pleased with his weight because he loses too much speed when he gains pounds. During the fight itself, Pacquiao weighed 148 lb, 17 pounds lighter than Margarito's 165.

Prior to the fight, Pacquiao's team demanded to the Texas officials to test Margarito for banned substances after a weight loss supplement, reportedly Hydroxycut, was found in his locker. It was stated that the officials would undergo testing for both boxers after the fight. In the fight, Pacquiao defeated Margarito via unanimous decision, using his superior handspeed and movement to win his eighth world title in as many divisions. In the penultimate round, Pacquiao implored referee Laurence Cole several times to stop the fight as Margarito had a swollen face and a large cut beneath the right eye, but the referee let the fight continue. Margarito had to be taken directly to the hospital after the fight, where it was discovered his orbital bone had been fractured; he had to undergo surgery.

On November 22, 2010, after winning world title in his eighth weight division, Pacquiao was awarded with another Congressional Medal of Distinction during the ceremony at the Philippine House of Representatives.

Because Pacquiao had no plans to defend the WBC super welterweight title that he won against Margarito, the WBC Board of Governors voted to declare the title vacant.

=== Return to welterweight ===
==== Pacquiao vs. Mosley ====
On May 7, 2011, Pacquiao successfully defended his WBO welterweight title against three-division world champion Shane Mosley via lopsided unanimous decision at the MGM Grand Garden Arena. Rapper LL Cool J performed as Mosley first entered the arena, while vocalist Jimi Jamison of the rock band Survivor sang "Eye of the Tiger" as Pacquiao approached the ring. Pacquiao knocked Mosley down in the third round using a one-two capped with a left straight. Mosley was left dazed by the knockdown but managed to stand up. Mosley floored Pacquiao in the tenth round with a push, but referee Kenny Bayless inexplicably ruled it a knockdown. None of the judges seemed to have bought it judging from the scores. Replays showed that Pacquiao was throwing a punch off balance, had his right foot stepped on by Mosley's left foot and went down with a little help from Mosley's right hand. Bayless apologized to Pacquiao after the fight for the mistake. Pacquiao gained one-sided verdicts from all three judges 119–108, 120–108, and 120–107. Pacquiao reported that the only thing preventing him from knocking out Mosley was a cramp in his legs. Freddie Roach said that Pacquiao had problems with cramping before but usually in training sessions and not in the middle of bouts. After the fight, there was much controversy over Mosley reportedly telling Floyd Mayweather Jr. that he should have made Pacquiao "take the test."

Bob Arum talked about having Pacquiao's next bout at the MGM Grand Garden Arena on November 5, 2011, or across town at the Thomas & Mack Center on November 12, 2011. Arum listed Juan Manuel Márquez as the first choice and then mentioned Timothy Bradley and Zab Judah as other options.

==== Pacquiao vs. Márquez III ====
Pacquiao's promoter Bob Arum stated that a third meeting with Márquez could happen in November 2011, providing Pacquiao defeated his next opponent Shane Mosley on May 7. On May 10, Márquez accepted an offer from Top Rank to fight Pacquiao for his WBO welterweight title at a catchweight of 144 pounds. On May 18, Márquez signed the deal to fight Pacquiao for the third time on November 12 in Las Vegas.

On November 12, Pacquiao defeated Márquez via majority decision 114–114, 115–113, and 116–112. Upon the results being announced, the crowd reaction was largely negative with thousands continuing to boo as Pacquiao spoke with Max Kellerman. Tim Smith of New York's Daily News wrote that Márquez "was robbed of a decision by judges who were either blind or corrupt." However, ringside punch stats showed Pacquiao landing more strikes, 176 to 138, and landing more power punches, 117 to 100. Michael Woods of ESPN stated that Márquez was not robbed noting the CompuBox stats, all of which favored Pacquiao.

==== Pacquiao vs. Bradley ====
On February 5, Bob Arum announced Timothy Bradley as Pacquiao's next opponent on June 9 for his WBO welterweight title, after another failed negotiation attempt with Floyd Mayweather Jr. on Cinco de Mayo. During the final press conference, WBO President Francisco "Paco" Valcarcel awarded Pacquiao with WBO Diamond Ring in recognition of Pacquiao as the WBO Best Pound-for-Pound Fighter of the Decade.

Pacquiao lost the bout in a controversial split decision, scoring 115–113, 113–115, and 113–115 from the three judges. The decision was booed by the crowd and criticized by many news outlets who were independently scoring the fight. However, Pacquiao was gracious in defeat and Bradley called for a rematch. Following the decision, many analysts called the decision a sign of corruption in the sport. ESPN.com scored the fight 119–109 for Pacquiao. HBO's unofficial judge, Harold Lederman, also had it 119–109 for Pacquiao. Most ringside media also scored the fight in favor of Pacquiao.

Four days after the fight, Valcarcel said on June 13, 2012, that, though the WBO did not doubt the ability of the scoring judges, the WBO's Championship Committee would review the video of the fight with five independent, competent and recognized international judges and make a recommendation. On June 21, 2012, the five WBO Championship Committee judges on the review panel announced that Pacquiao should have won, with all five judges scoring the fight in Pacquiao's favor 117–111, 117–111, 118–110, 116–112, and 115–113. The WBO cannot overturn the result of the fight (only the Nevada State Athletic Commission (NSAC) would be able to do so), but recommended a rematch between the fighters.

==== Pacquiao vs. Márquez IV ====
Pacquiao fought Juan Manuel Márquez on December 8, 2012. The fight was for the WBO's "Champion of the Decade" belt. Márquez knocked down Pacquiao in the third round with a looping right hook. In round five, Pacquiao returned the favor, knocking down Márquez. Pacquiao went on the offensive in the sixth round. While behind the scorecards and with just one second left in the sixth round, Márquez countered Pacquiao's jab with an overhand right, sending Pacquiao face first to the canvas, resulting in a knockout. Pacquiao, who had not been knocked out in over 13 years since his loss to Medgoen Singsurat in 1999, remained unconscious for several minutes. This was named The Ring magazine's "Fight of the Year" and "Knockout of the Year" and "International Fight of the Year" by the British website BoxRec. Márquez was also named "International Fighter of the Year" by the same publication.

==== Pacquiao vs. Ríos ====
After 11 months away from boxing, Pacquiao returned to the ring on November 24, 2013, at The Venetian Macao Hotel & Resort's Cotai Arena in Macau of the Special administrative regions in China against The Ring ranked No. 6 light welterweight: Brandon Ríos, for the vacant WBO International welterweight title. This was Pacquiao's first fight to be held in China. Pacquiao won the match by unanimous decision.

==== Pacquiao vs. Bradley II ====
Following his victory over Rios, Pacquiao sought out and ultimately got a rematch with the WBO welterweight champion of the world: Timothy Bradley who, following his controversial win over Pacquiao in their first fight in 2012, had defended the title with a victory over Ruslan Provodnikov, followed by a close, but clear split decision verdict over Juan Manuel Márquez. The fight was eventually set for the date of April 12, 2014, at the MGM Grand Garden Arena in Las Vegas, Nevada. In a tough fight, Pacquiao came on the stronger of the two fighters throughout the later rounds of the fight to end up gaining a unanimous decision victory from the judges 118–110, 116–112, and 116–112.

==== Pacquiao vs. Algieri ====
Pacquiao faced undefeated WBO light welterweight champion Chris Algieri in Macau on November 23, 2014, for Pacquiao's welterweight title. Pacquiao dominated the bout and scored six official knockdowns en route to a lopsided victory via unanimous decision 119–103, 119–103, and 120–102.

==== Pacquiao vs. Mayweather ====
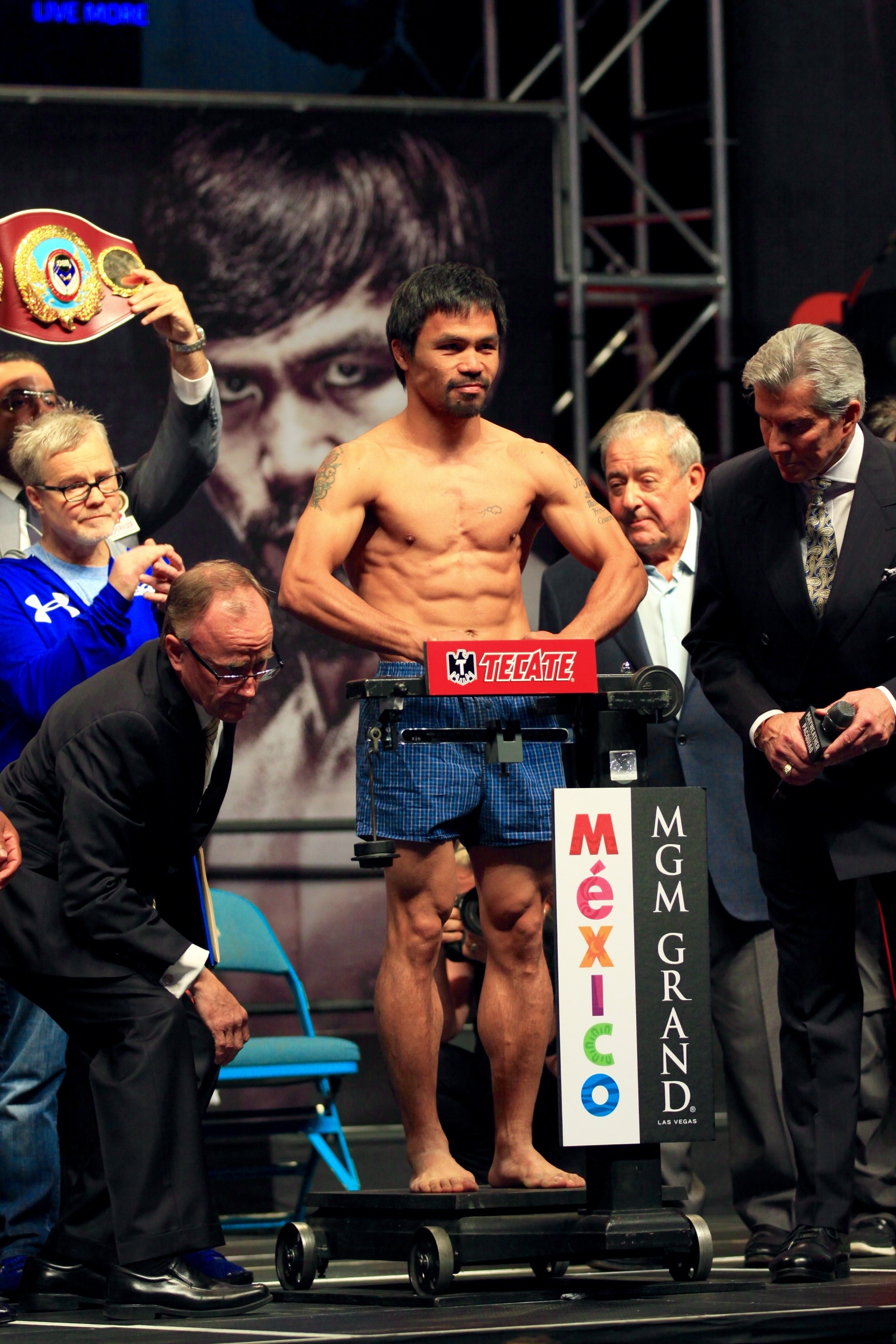
Pacquiao during at the weigh-in for his fight against Floyd Mayweather Jr., 2015

Pacquiao fought Floyd Mayweather Jr. in Las Vegas at the MGM Grand Garden Arena on May 2, 2015. After years of tumultuous negotiations, the two finally met in the ring, Pacquiao with the intent to be the aggressor and Mayweather with the strategy of diffuse and counter. The fight went the distance and to the official judges' scorecards which read 118–110, 116–112, and 116–112 in favor of Mayweather.

17 of the 19 reporters ringside for the bout scored in favour of Mayweather.

Pacquiao said "I had a torn shoulder" as well as "I thought I won the fight. He's moving around. It's not easy to throw punches when he's moving around so much. It's not about size. Size doesn't matter. I fought bigger. I thought I caught him many more times than he caught me."

In the end, the Mayweather vs. Pacquiao match earned a record 4.4 million pay-per-view buys.

=== Retirement ===
==== Pacquiao vs. Bradley III ====
Top Rank promoter Bob Arum said Pacquiao's next opponents were to be either Terence Crawford, Lucas Matthysse or Kell Brook. There was also speculation that Amir Khan would be another possible foe.

Boxing fans were surprised when Pacquiao and his camp chose to challenge Timothy Bradley in a rubber match on April 9, 2016, at the MGM Grand Garden Arena in Las Vegas for the WBO International welterweight title. According to Pacquiao, this was to be his last fight as a professional.

On February 22, Philippine senatorial candidate Walden Bello asked the Commission of Elections (COMELEC) to cancel Pacquiao's fight against Bradley, because it will give the boxer-politician free publicity, violating the Republic Act 9006 or the Fair Elections Act. The fight will fall in the 90-day national candidates campaign period for the national elections. Arum said in an interview that the fight's cancellation is not yet an option and stated that there is no conflict-of-interest between the fight and Pacquiao's senatorial campaign.

Pacquiao won the match via unanimous decision to capture the vacant WBO International title. After the match, Pacquiao said, "As of now, I am retired" and later shared "I'm going to go home and think about it. I want to be with my family. I want to serve the people."

=== Comeback ===
On June 23, 2016, it was reported that Pacquiao would return to boxing ring later that year after a brief retirement. In an interview with BoxingScene, Top Rank president Bob Arum said: "Well we gotta see. If he will fight this year, then he will fight next year. We are thinking about him fighting in October if he wants to fight. Once I get the opponent that I am working on – we are working on opponents and once I get that, I will fly over to the Philippines and he will see if his schedule in the senate allows him to train for a fight and participate in a fight. I know he wants to continue fighting but the impediment is how labor intensive his work as a Filipino senator is and he is not going to really know that for another week or so. He was just sworn in as a senator yesterday," According to Yahoo! Sports, Arum reserved Mandalay Bay for October 15, just in case Pacquiao decides to continue fighting in the ring. Arum said: "I'm not sure Manny is going to return, but I believe he wants to return. The question is, can he return and yet fulfill his duties as a senator in the Philippines? I don't think even he knows that answer yet, because he's just taken office."

According to a BoxingScene report, Arum said that Pacquiao has even brought up with the Senate leadership the possibility of taking a leave of absence to train for a fight: "He is going to fight. I don't know what the date is. He is working with the President of the Philippines Senate for an appropriate date where he can leave the Philippines for two or three weeks to prepare for the fight." There were also reports that a fight between Pacquiao and Adrien Broner was being negotiated, something embraced by Pacquiao's longtime trainer Freddie Roach. But Arum, for his part, said Broner priced himself out of the fight: "That is correct (that Broner priced himself out). I was dealing with (Broner's adviser) Al Haymon on making that fight. Al tried but Broner was asking for crazy money that nobody can afford so he is out and Manny is looking for another opponent." Arum told in an interview. Other leading candidates for Pacquiao's comeback were WBO welterweight champion Jessie Vargas, WBC welterweight champion Danny García and the winner of the July 23 light welterweight title unification bout between WBO light welterweight champion Terence Crawford and WBC light welterweight champion Viktor Postol.

On July 13, Pacquiao responded to rumors that he intends to take a leave of absence from the Philippine Senate for an upcoming bout – as stated by Top Rank Promotions head, Bob Arum. In his official statement; Pacquiao denied such rumors and assured the public that his current priority is to fulfill his duties as a legislator of the Philippines:

"There is no truth to media reports that I'm planning to take a leave from my senate duties just to fight again atop the ring. I want to make it clear – my priority is my legislative works.

My next fight has not yet been discussed. Should there be any, I'll make sure it will not interfere with my senate duties. When I ran for senator last May 9 elections, I made a promise to be present in all sessions. I owe it to the people.

If ever I decide to fight again, rest assured, it will happen when congress is on recess so there's no need for me to go on leave. The entire training will be done in the Philippines to ensure I can attend sessions even while on training camp. Boxing is my only means of livelihood to support my family and to help those who are in need. Politics, to me, is a vocation not a means to eke out a living.

I want to maintain that belief. I want to keep my dignity intact while in public service.

May God continue to guide and bless all our endeavors."

On July 11, Arum said that Pacquiao will return to the ring sometime in the fall, likely either on October 29 or November 5, in the main event of a pay-per-view card staged in Las Vegas and televised by HBO. Arum said in an interview: "He now has given us the go-ahead to shop for a venue and an opponent and see if we can do it on a particular date or dates. We've been trying to work out a date that doesn't interfere with his senatorial responsibilities and his ability to train." Subsequently, on July 18, Arum confirmed that Pacquiao was set to fight on November 5 at the Thomas & Mack Center in Las Vegas, Nevada.

Senate President Franklin Drilon expressed his support for Pacquiao's reported plan to go back to boxing, confirming for the first time that the newly elected senator had sought his permission to fight again. Pacquiao adviser Michael Koncz said in a report that the southpaw, while committed to politics, is happiest when he is in the ring: "Manny's primary concern and obligation is to fulfill his senatorial duties. But he just misses boxing. He misses the training. He misses being in the gym. You can see when he trains it's like a stress reliever for him. His mood changes. It's like he's in happy land. So I am working with Bob and Manny is working closely with the senate president to make sure the dates are okay. We're doing this properly."

==== Pacquiao vs. Vargas ====
On August 3, Pacquiao's business manager confirmed that WBO welterweight champion Jessie Vargas (27–1) will be the next opponent for Pacquiao on November 5, at the Thomas & Mack Center in Las Vegas, Nevada. Pacquiao made the confirmation after a two-hour meeting with Top Rank's Bob Arum and Canadian adviser Michael Koncz held in Manila on August 7, that he agreed to fight Vargas. "Yes, the fight is on. I have agreed to a Nov. 5 fight with reigning WBO welterweight champion Jessie Vargas. Boxing is my passion. I miss what I'd been doing inside the gym and atop the ring. My entire training camp will be held here in the Philippines so I can attend to my legislative works. This is my campaign promise and I'm determined to keep it," Pacquiao said. He also explained that he has to fight again to earn a living: "Boxing is my main source of income. I can't rely on my salary as public official. I'm helping the family of my wife and my own family, as well. Many people also come to me to ask for help and I just couldn't ignore them."

On August 11, it was revealed by Bob Arum that the fight will not be distributed by HBO PPV despite a contract with Pacquiao. HBO reportedly declined to carry the fight because they are already committed to hosting the anticipated November 19 fight between unified light heavyweight champion Sergey Kovalev and former lineal super middleweight champion Andre Ward and certainly the network couldn't handle two PPVs in one month and would prefer for Pacquiao to fight on October 29, along with the Wladimir Klitschko vs. Tyson Fury heavyweight championship match instead. But Arum said Pacquiao has to fight around his Philippine Senate schedule which effectively makes other fight dates impossible. Arum reiterated that if HBO will not produce or distribute the PPV, it will invalidate Pacquiao's contract with the network and make him a free agent: "In my opinion, they have an obligation to distribute this fight. The fact that they passed means the contract is over, it seems clear to me. They can't pick and choose which fights they are going to distribute. They're either in breach of contract or they've ended the contract. My feeling is, based my legal background, is that the contract is terminated."

HBO, on the other hand, believed that their existing contract with Pacquiao still stands, although they would not publicly comment on the disagreement otherwise. Arum said that HBO has no right to object to the date since he's putting up the money as the promoter while the network bears no risk. He also claims that their contract with the network clearly states that only Pacquiao's opponent has to be mutually agreed upon by both sides, not the date. HBO has televised nearly all of Pacquiao's major fights including 21 pay-per-views since 2003. According to Arum, possible distributor of the fight include cable giants Turner Broadcasting System, ESPN and HBO's rival network Showtime.

In a press conference on September 8 held in Los Angeles, California, it was announced by Bob Arum that the fight will be self-distributed by Top Rank PPV. He also revealed that his company will continue to produce and distribute future pay-per-view events without the involvement of HBO. As for the commentating panel, Arum stressed that he plans to put a star-studded announcing team, which will rival the work of HBO's Jim Lampley and Max Kellerman. Arum confided that he is in talks with major boxing analysts, but he declined to name one as he has not worked out any official deals yet. "I think the commentating team is going to blow everybody's socks off," he vowed. According to Arum, Top Rank's initial plans have received a good feedback from its partners and television (TV) companies, which gives him a hindsight that they could pull it off. "They're all very, very receptive to getting this kind of programming. But right now, this looks like the most likely scenario," Arum stated.

On September 26, Top Rank unveiled the broadcast team for the November 5 PPV bout featuring sports commentating stars Stephen A. Smith of ESPN, Brian Kenny of MLB Network, Charissa Thompson of Fox Sports and former two-division and five-time world champion Timothy Bradley as the ringside commentating team for the fight. The pay-per-view telecast would also feature WBO super bantamweight champion Nonito Donaire and WBO featherweight champion Óscar Valdez. This marked the first time Pacquiao and Donaire, the two biggest boxing stars to come out of the Philippines, had ever shared the same card.

Floyd Mayweather Jr. made an entrance and sat ringside with his daughter before the main event began. When asked why he was at the fight, he replied, "I'm just taking her to the fight.", whilst pointing to his daughter. In front of 16,132 in attendance, Pacquiao defeated Vargas in a lopsided unanimous decision to win the WBO welterweight title for the third time. In the second round, Pacquiao caught Vargas with a straight left counter, dropping him to the canvas. In the eighth round, an accidental clash of heads opened a deep cut on Vargas’ right eyebrow. However, replays between rounds clearly showed that the cut above Vargas’ eye in the eighth was caused by a left straight punch, which the Nevada Athletic Commission has ruled. In the eleventh round, Vargas went down on a slip, tripping over his feet after he got hit by a right. Vargas went down again in the twelfth round, but Kenny Bayless ruled it another slip. Pacquiao won on all three judges' scorecards 118–109, 118–109, and 114–113. According to CompuBox statistics, Pacquiao landed 147 of 409 of his punches (36%) and Vargas landed 104 of 562 of his punches thrown (19%). Pacquiao was guaranteed $4 million plus a percentage of the revenue of the fight while Vargas was guaranteed $2.5 million. The bout sold 300,000 pay-per-view buys in the United States, earning an estimated $18 million in pay-per-view revenue.

==== Pacquiao vs. Horn ====
On February 26, 2017, both Pacquiao and Amir Khan announced on Twitter that they would face each other on April 23 in a "super fight". The United Arab Emirates (UAE) specifically Abu Dhabi, were front runners to host the fight worth potentially £30 million, with the United States (US) and the United Kingdom (UK) also being possibilities. Pacquiao was initially in negotiations to fight Jeff Horn in Australia, but held a poll asking the fans who he should fight next. Khan won the poll, thus setting up the fight. The Sevens Stadium in Dubai, Zayed Sports City Stadium and Mohammed Bin Zayed Stadium in Abu Dhabi were being considered as the venue. Speaking to Bob Arum on March 1, Pacquiao's adviser Michael Koncz confirmed the fight would take place on May 19 in the United States which means it would be a Friday night PPV and May 20 in the Middle-East. In the early morning of March 2, Bob Arum stated that the date of the fight was not close to being set with Khan's representatives. Later that day, Khan's camp confirmed they had agreed the revised fight date. Bob Arum told ESPN on March 8 that there was never a deal in place for the fight to take place, "It's kaddish for the UAE deal. It's dead." Arum also mentioned that if there was any chance the fight can take place, it would be in the second half of 2017 and that Khan would not be Pacquiao's next opponent.

On March 27, Arum told the International Business Times (IBT) that Pacquiao vs. Horn was back on. A likely date of July 2, 2017, was discussed. On April 1, it was confirmed that Horn had signed the contract at his end and was waiting for Pacquiao, who was believed to have received the contract. He and his team were going over the terms. "We have to get the contract signed. They’re reviewing the contract and hopefully it will be signed in the next hours or so. On the Australian side, everything is done. Jeff Horn has signed the contract," Arum told The Star. Arum later stated that there was no deadline for an agreement to be reached before declaring 'everything is done'. It was reported by The Manila Times on April 7 that Pacquiao had signed for the fight to take place at Suncorp Stadium in Brisbane, Australia. It was noted that he would start training in the first week of May. Around 55,000 fans around the world were expected to be in attendance and the event would pump at least $24 million into the local economy. On April 10, Carl Moretti told ESPN the fight was close to being finalized. Bob Arum officially announced the fight on April 10, billed as "The Battle of Brisbane". On June 1, it was reported that 40,000 tickets had been sold within over a month left for the fight. On June 19, 2017, it was announced that ESPN and Top Rank finalized a deal that would air the bout live on ESPN. This marked the first time that a Pacquiao fight would not be on pay-per-view since his co-main event fight against Héctor Velázquez on September 10, 2005.

In front of 51,052, Pacquiao lost a hard-fought fight via a controversial unanimous decision when the three judges scored it 117–111, 115–113, and 115–113 in favor of Horn. Many pundits, current and former boxers believed Pacquiao had done enough to retain the WBO title. Although Horn was the aggressor and showed determination throughout the fight, it nearly came to an end in round nine when Pacquiao took control and looked for the stoppage. Horn survived the round and was told by referee Mark Nelson, that he needed to show competitiveness or else he would stop the fight. Despite now having lost four of his last nine fights, Pacquiao remained humble, "I’m professional. I respect the judges." It was reported that Horn would receive $500,000 from this fight and Pacquiao was guaranteed at least $10 million. Pacquiao stated he would activate the rematch clause and fight Horn again at the end of 2017. CompuBox stats showed that Pacquiao landed 182 out of 573 punches thrown (32%), whilst Horn landed 92 of 625 thrown (15%).

Post-fight stats showed that Pacquiao landed almost double the number of punches that Horn landed. Dieter Kurtenbach of Fox Sports described the fight as "rigged", and T. J. Quinn of ESPN commented, "No way in hell Horn won unanimously," he tweeted. "A 117–111 card? Ridiculous. This is a hometown hit job. Manny looked old, but mostly in control".

In regards to the controversial scorecards, ESPN's Dan Rafael scored the fight 117–111 and ESPN analyst Teddy Atlas scored it 116–111, both for Pacquiao. The Guardian and the IBT also scored the fight in favor of Pacquiao as well, 117–111. BoxingScene had it 116–112 for Pacquiao, while CBS Sports scored the fight 114–114 even. BoxNation's Steve Bunce scored the fight 115–113 for Horn. In total, 12 of 15 media outlets scored the bout for Pacquiao, 2 of 15 outlets ruled in favor of Horn and 1 scored a draw. Pacquiao claimed Horn got away with numerous dirty tactics in the fight, using illegal blows including elbows and headbutts, causing him to be cut on three different occasions during the fight.

On July 6, 2017, the WBO announced that it would re-score the Manny Pacquiao vs. Jeff Horn fight but the result would still stand. The WBO rescored the fight 7 rounds to 5 in favour of Horn. Top Rank CEO Bob Arum said the result of the WBO's review "doesn't settle anything." Arum stated: "First of all they didn't [rule] that Jeff Horn clearly won the fight. They (WBO) had five judges scoring the fight: three had Horn winning narrowly, one had it a draw, one had Pacquiao winning." Pacquiao was 'not surprised' with the re-score and vowed to fight on and continue his professional boxing career.

==== Pacquiao vs. Matthysse ====
On January 16, 2018, it was first reported that Pacquiao would return to the ring on the undercard of Terence Crawford vs. Jeff Horn for the WBO welterweight championship on April 21. Arum wanted the card to take place at the T-Mobile Arena in Las Vegas and have the card take place on ESPN PPV. Early rumours indicated he would fight 37-year-old former WBO light welterweight champion Mike Alvarado (38–4). On February 2, after winning the vacant WBA (Regular) welterweight title against Tewa Kiram, Lucas Matthysse (39–4–0–1) stated he was interested in fighting Pacquiao next. Freddie Roach as well as Golden Boy Promotions Eric Gomez liked the idea of the fight happening. Arum was also open to fight taking place, but stated it wouldn't happen next as he was likely to match Pacquiao with Alvarado. On March 1, Pacquiao withdrew from the Crawford-Horn card. According to Aquiles Zonio, Pacquiao's media relations officer, Pacquiao felt it was an insult to have him in a non-main event roll and felt he was the obvious ticket seller for the card, also believing he beat Horn in their fight in 2017. In an interview, Pacquiao told ABS-CBN television he would fight in Malaysia, where he has a group willing to put up the necessary funds, in May or June 2018. It was said that Pacquiao's MP Promotions would promote the event with a confirmed date of June 24. Arum played down the talks and said the fight had not been finalized. Pacquiao started training for the potential bout on March 12. Although the fight wasn't officially announced, the date was pushed back to July 8. Pacquiao explained the reason the date had changed was because June 24 would have fallen 10 days after the Islamic month, Ramadan and more than 60% of Malaysia's population are Muslim.

On April 2, the fight was officially confirmed for July 14, US time in Kuala Lumpur, Malaysia. Pacquiao would go into the fight without long-time trainer Freddie Roach and instead be trained by his life-long friend Buboy Fernandez, who had served as an assistant trainer in previous fights. It would mark the first time in 34 fights, since 2001 that Roach would not be in Pacquiao's corner. It was noted that Top Rank would deal with the television distribution of the fight in the United States with the fight taking place on ESPN+, at the time, ESPN's new monthly subscription streaming service. For the fight to take place during primetime hours in the US due to the time difference, the bout would take place on Sunday morning, July 15 in Malaysia. On April 13, it was officially rumored that Pacquiao had parted ways with Roach. However, on April 15, Pacquiao revealed via social media that he had not decided on who would train him for the bout against Matthysse. On May 18, according to sources in Argentina, the fight was in jeopardy and likely to be postponed. However, Pacquiao denied the reports a day later and called the rumours "malicious and untrue." By July 1, there were still doubts about the fight taking place, notably from Bob Arum. However, Pacquiao told Philboxing.com the preparations were in the final stages and the funds would be released to Golden Boy in the coming days. On July 2, Golden Boy and Matthysse confirmed receipt of funds and proposed to fly out to Malaysia the next day.

The fight took place at the Axiata Arena. Pacquiao scored his first knockout in over eight years by stopping Matthysse in round seven to win the WBA (Regular) welterweight title. Pacquiao dropped Matthysse a total of three times before the fight was stopped. The knockdowns occurred in rounds three, five and seven. Matthysse took a knee in the fifth round and was decked by a left hook in the seventh, following a combination. Referee Kenny Bayless began the count, stopping the fight at 2:43 after Matthysse spat out his mouthpiece. At the time of the stoppage, all three judges had the bout 59–53 in favor of Pacquiao. Speaking about the game plan, Pacquiao said, "Matthysse has the power, so hands up all the time and do my best. I'm surprised because Matthysse is a very tough opponent and I knocked him down. I was focused and patient in the fight, and I worked hard in training. We did a good job in training. We were pushing hard." Matthysse had no excuses, stating he lost to "a great fighter and a great champion." At the post-fight press conference, Pacquiao confirmed he would continue boxing. According to CompuBox, Pacquiao landed 95 of 344 punches thrown (28%), this included a 44% connect rate on his power punches. Matthysse landed 57 of his 246 thrown (23%), only landing in double figures in round six. On August 2, Matthysse announced his retirement from professional boxing at the age of 35.

==== Pacquiao vs. Broner ====
After Pacquiao signed with Al Haymon in October 2018, reports circulated that Adrien Broner was the front-runner to face him in January 2019. On October 18, 2018, Pacquiao confirmed that the deal was almost complete. On November 19, 2018, a press conference was held in New York City to confirm the fight between Pacquiao and Broner on January 19, 2019, for the WBA (Regular) welterweight title. Pacquiao reunited with long-time trainer Freddie Roach, who supervised the whole training camp, while Buboy Fernandez did the mitts and physical parts of the training due to Pacquiao's concern of Roach's health. The fight took place at the MGM Grand Garden Arena in Las Vegas, Nevada and was distributed by Showtime PPV. Pacquiao was guaranteed at least $20 million from the fight, with $10 million being his base purse and the remainder made up from PPV revenue, Filipino TV rights, sponsorship and merchandise. Broner was paid a $2.5 million fight purse.

Pacquiao successfully defended his WBA (Regular) welterweight title against Broner via unanimous decision and never seemed troubled throughout the fight. In the seventh round, Pacquiao trapped Broner against the ropes and unloaded a barrage of punches that prompted Broner to tie him up. Pacquiao then continued his onslaught after the break, but Broner survived the round. Two rounds later, Pacquiao landed a huge left hand that sent Broner reeling backwards. All three judges ruled in favor of Pacquiao 117–111, 116–112, and 116–112. According to CompuBox, Pacquiao landed 82 out of 197 of his power punches (42%) against Broner's 39 out of 180 power punches (22%). Total punch stats were 112 out of 568 (20%) for Pacquiao and 50 out of 295 (17%) for Broner. This marked Broner's career low for total punches landed at 50, his previous low was 90 against Jessie Vargas. During the post-fight interview, Jim Gray asked Pacquiao if a Floyd Mayweather Jr. rematch would happen and Pacquiao answered, "Tell him to come back to the ring, and we will fight." Mayweather, who was ringside, was asked by Gray to nod at the camera if he wanted a rematch with Pacquiao but Mayweather did not give an answer.

The fight sold 400,000 pay-per-view buys in the United States, earning an estimated $30 million in pay-per-view revenue. The bout produced a live gate of $6 million from 11,410 tickets sold. The final attendance was reported to be 13,025.

==== Pacquiao vs. Thurman ====
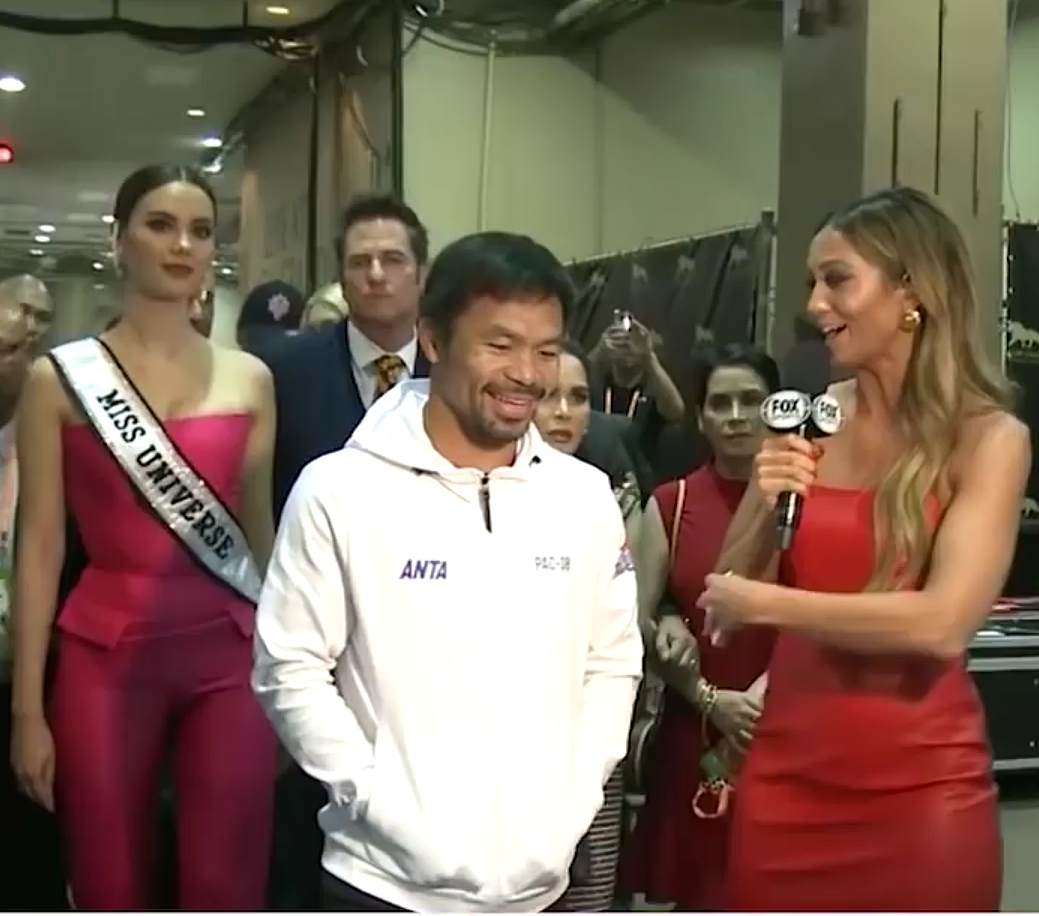
Pacquiao's grand arrival for the Thurman fight

Pacquiao defeated Keith Thurman via split decision for Thurman's WBA (Super) welterweight title on July 20, 2019, in Las Vegas at the MGM Grand Garden Arena. Late in the first round, Pacquiao caught Thurman with a right hand to the chin after a left to the body and knocked him down as he was moving backwards. The first five rounds were vintage for Pacquiao; he bloodied Thurman's nose and forced him into a very intense fight. Thurman looked to have regained his composure in the middle rounds, adjusted to Pacquiao's offense in the second half of the fight and was able to catch him with some hard shots. But in the tenth round, Pacquiao caught Thurman again; this time, it was a vicious left hook to the body that had him moving around the ring, trying to survive the round. Thurman was visibly hurt by the body shot; he later admitted, "The body shot was a terrific body shot. I even took my mouthpiece out of my mouth just so I could breathe a little deeper". Glenn Feldman scored the bout 114–113 for Thurman; Dave Moretti and Tim Cheatham both scored it 115–112 for Pacquiao. Many people, including Pacquiao himself, felt that the first-round knockdown and the tenth-round body shot rightfully secured him the win.

According to CompuBox, Thurman was the more accurate boxer and out-landed Pacquiao. Pacquiao only landed 113 out of 340 of his power punches (33%) against Thurman's 192 out of 443 power punches (43%). Pacquiao was the busier fighter and had a difference of more than 100 punches compared to Thurman. Total punch stats were 195 out of 686 (28%) for Pacquiao and 210 out of 571 (37%) for Thurman. The bout sold 500,000 pay-per-view buys in the United States, earning an estimated $37.5 million in pay-per-view revenue.

With the victory, Pacquiao also became the first boxer to become a recognized four-time welterweight champion, breaking his tie with Jack Britton and Emile Griffith. He also became the oldest welterweight champion in boxing history at the age of 40.

On January 29, 2021, Pacquiao was stripped of his title due to inactivity, with WBA (Regular) champion Yordenis Ugás being elevated to the status of WBA (Super) champion. Pacquiao himself was designated "champion in recess" by the WBA.

==== Cancelled bout vs. Spence Jr. ====
On May 21, 2021, Pacquiao made an announcement on his social media that he would return to the ring on August 21 in Las Vegas to face undefeated unified WBC and IBF welterweight champion Errol Spence Jr. on Fox PPV. PBC and Fox confirmed the news, and it was reported that both men have signed contracts to face each other. The two men had previously already met more than two years prior on March 16, 2019, in the ring following Spence's unanimous decision victory over Mikey Garcia in Arlington, Texas, when both Pacquiao and Spence indicated they would relish the chance to fight each other. It was officially announced on June 23 that the bout would take place at the T-Mobile Arena.

However, on August 10, it was announced that Spence was forced to pull out of the bout due to suffering an injury to his left eye.

==== Pacquiao vs. Ugás ====
On August 10, the bout against Spence was cancelled because of Spence's eye injury and is replaced by Yordenis Ugás, who was supposed to defend his WBA (Super) welterweight title on the undercard against Fabián Maidana. The new opponent meant that Pacquiao would now instead be challenging for the same title he had previously won by defeating Keith Thurman in 2019 and was subsequently stripped of. Pacquiao appeared to relish the opportunity, stating, "The proper way and the only way to win a world title is inside the ring." Prior to the fight, Pacquiao admitted that his bout with Ugás may be the final fight of his career.

The bout was a competitive affair, with Ugás using his jab and looping right hand effectively to control the distance. While Pacquiao had moments of success throughout the night, he never truly settled into a rhythm and was noticeably stiffer than usual, not showcasing the deft footwork that he has been known for throughout his career. Pacquiao himself admitted after the fight that his legs were "tight". At the final bell, Ugás was awarded a unanimous decision victory with scores of 116–112, 116–112 and 115–113. According to CompuBox, Pacquiao threw over double the number of punches compared to Ugás, but landed fewer, making the latter the far more accurate boxer on the night. Pacquiao landed 130 punches of 815 thrown (16%), while Ugás landed 151 punches of 405 thrown (37.3%).

In his post-fight interview, Pacquiao addressed the speculation that he would imminently retire from the sport of boxing: "I don't know. Let me rest first and relax and make a decision if I fight again." He also stated that he would make an announcement in September as to whether or not he would run for President of the Philippines. On August 25, Pacquiao said he was considering the idea of a January 2022 rematch against Ugás: "Yes, I can come back in January. I will see about it. I know I can rematch him if I want. I'll just need to tell Al Haymon. That would be no problem."

=== Second retirement ===
On September 19, 2021, Pacquiao announced that he would be running for President of the Philippines in the 2022 Philippine presidential election, after being nominated by a faction of the ruling party PDP-Laban. The following day, he indicated his retirement from boxing, telling Toni Gonzaga in an interview: "My boxing career is already over. It's done because I've been in boxing for a long time and my family says that it is enough."

On September 29, 2021, Pacquiao officially announced his retirement from boxing in a post on social media.

=== Second comeback ===
==== Pacquiao vs. Barrios ====
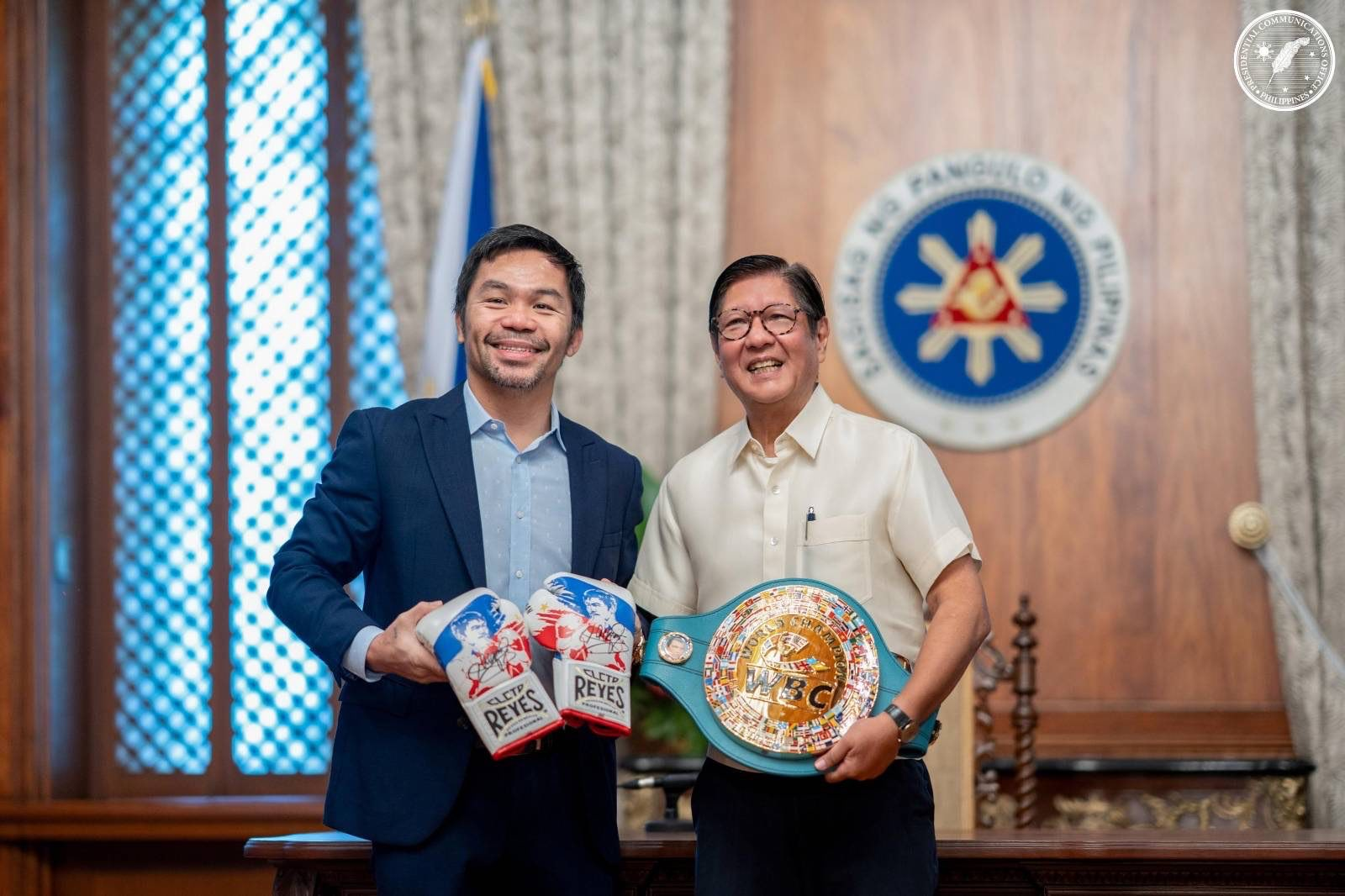
President Ferdinand R. Marcos Jr. received boxing legend and Hall of Famer Manny Pacquiao in a courtesy call in Malacañan Palace in 2025.

In May 2025, it was announced that Pacquiao would end his nearly four-year retirement with a return bout against Mario Barrios for the WBC welterweight championship on July 19 in Las Vegas.

On July 19, 2025, the bout ended in a majority draw after 12 competitive rounds. One judge scored the contest 115–113 for Barrios, while the other two judges scored it 114–114, allowing Barrios to retain the WBC welterweight title.

==== Pacquiao vs. Mayweather II ====
On February 23, he announced that he would fight in a rematch with Floyd Mayweather Jr. on September 26, 2026. However, this planned rematch with Mayweather would be delayed until at least 2027 after Mayweather was sued for breach of contract obligations.

== Exhibition bouts ==
=== Pacquiao vs. Salud ===
On August 20, 2002, Pacquiao faced former WBA super bantamweight champion Jesus Salud in an exhibition match in Honolulu, as one of the undercard of Gerry Peñalosa vs. Seiji Tanaka. Pacquiao defeated Salud in the three-round exhibition match.

=== Pacquiao vs. Yoo ===
On December 11, 2022, in the Korea International Exhibition Center, Pacquiao fought a 6-round exhibition match against South Korean martial artist, DK Yoo. Pacquiao won the exhibition by unanimous decision.

=== Pacquiao vs. Anpo ===
At a June 10, 2024 Tokyo press conference, it is reported that Manny Pacquiao and Chihiro Suzuki signed a three-round exhibition fight on July 28 in Saitama Super Arena. However, in late June it was announced that Suzuki withdrew from the bout, and was replaced by former K-1 Super Lightweight Champion Rukiya Anpo. The bout was declared a draw as there were no judges and neither boxer could score a knockout.

== Professional boxing record ==
73 fights	62 wins	8 losses
By knockout	39	3
By decision	23	5
Draws	3	

No.	Result	Record	Opponent	Type	Round, time	Date	Age	Location	Notes
73	Draw	62–8–3	Mario Barrios	MD	12	Jul 19, 2025	46 years, 214 days	MGM Grand Garden Arena, Paradise, Nevada, U.S.	For WBC welterweight title
72	Loss	62–8–2	Yordenis Ugás	UD	12	Aug 21, 2021	42 years, 247 days	T-Mobile Arena, Paradise, Nevada, U.S.	For WBA (Super) welterweight title
71	Win	62–7–2	Keith Thurman	SD	12	Jul 20, 2019	40 years, 215 days	MGM Grand Garden Arena, Paradise, Nevada, U.S.	Won WBA (Super) welterweight title
70	Win	61–7–2	Adrien Broner	UD	12	Jan 19, 2019	40 years, 33 days	MGM Grand Garden Arena, Paradise, Nevada, U.S.	Retained WBA (Regular) welterweight title
69	Win	60–7–2	Lucas Matthysse	TKO	7 (12), 2:43	Jul 15, 2018	39 years, 210 days	Axiata Arena, Kuala Lumpur, Malaysia	Won WBA (Regular) welterweight title
68	Loss	59–7–2	Jeff Horn	UD	12	Jul 2, 2017	38 years, 197 days	Suncorp Stadium, Brisbane, Queensland, Australia	Lost WBO welterweight title
67	Win	59–6–2	Jessie Vargas	UD	12	Nov 5, 2016	37 years, 324 days	Thomas & Mack Center, Paradise, Nevada, U.S.	Won WBO welterweight title
66	Win	58–6–2	Timothy Bradley	UD	12	Apr 9, 2016	37 years, 114 days	MGM Grand Garden Arena, Paradise, Nevada, U.S.	Won vacant WBO International welterweight title
65	Loss	57–6–2	Floyd Mayweather Jr.	UD	12	May 2, 2015	36 years, 136 days	MGM Grand Garden Arena, Paradise, Nevada, U.S.	Lost WBO welterweight title; For WBA (Unified), WBC and The Ring welterweight titles
64	Win	57–5–2	Chris Algieri	UD	12	Nov 23, 2014	35 years, 341 days	Cotai Arena, Macau SAR, China	Retained WBO welterweight title
63	Win	56–5–2	Timothy Bradley	UD	12	Apr 12, 2014	35 years, 116 days	MGM Grand Garden Arena, Paradise, Nevada, U.S.	Won WBO welterweight title
62	Win	55–5–2	Brandon Ríos	UD	12	Nov 24, 2013	34 years, 342 days	Cotai Arena, Macau SAR, China	Won vacant WBO International welterweight title
61	Loss	54–5–2	Juan Manuel Márquez	KO	6 (12), 2:59	Dec 8, 2012	33 years, 357 days	MGM Grand Garden Arena, Paradise, Nevada, U.S.	
60	Loss	54–4–2	Timothy Bradley	SD	12	Jun 9, 2012	33 years, 175 days	MGM Grand Garden Arena, Paradise, Nevada, U.S.	Lost WBO welterweight title
59	Win	54–3–2	Juan Manuel Márquez	MD	12	Nov 12, 2011	32 years, 330 days	MGM Grand Garden Arena, Paradise, Nevada, U.S.	Retained WBO welterweight title
58	Win	53–3–2	Shane Mosley	UD	12	May 7, 2011	32 years, 141 days	MGM Grand Garden Arena, Paradise, Nevada, U.S.	Retained WBO welterweight title
57	Win	52–3–2	Antonio Margarito	UD	12	Nov 13, 2010	31 years, 331 days	Cowboys Stadium, Arlington, Texas, U.S.	Won vacant WBC super welterweight title
56	Win	51–3–2	Joshua Clottey	UD	12	Mar 13, 2010	31 years, 86 days	Cowboys Stadium, Arlington, Texas, U.S.	Retained WBO welterweight title
55	Win	50–3–2	Miguel Cotto	TKO	12 (12), 0:55	Nov 14, 2009	30 years, 332 days	MGM Grand Garden Arena, Paradise, Nevada, U.S.	Won WBO welterweight title
54	Win	49–3–2	Ricky Hatton	KO	2 (12), 2:59	May 2, 2009	30 years, 136 days	MGM Grand Garden Arena, Paradise, Nevada, U.S.	Won IBO and The Ring light welterweight titles
53	Win	48–3–2	Oscar De La Hoya	RTD	8 (12), 3:00	Dec 6, 2008	29 years, 355 days	MGM Grand Garden Arena, Paradise, Nevada, U.S.	
52	Win	47–3–2	David Díaz	TKO	9 (12), 2:24	Jun 28, 2008	29 years, 194 days	Mandalay Bay Events Center, Paradise, Nevada, U.S.	Won WBC lightweight title
51	Win	46–3–2	Juan Manuel Márquez	SD	12	Mar 15, 2008	29 years, 89 days	Mandalay Bay Events Center, Paradise, Nevada, U.S.	Won WBC and vacant The Ring super featherweight titles
50	Win	45–3–2	Marco Antonio Barrera	UD	12	Oct 6, 2007	28 years, 293 days	Mandalay Bay Events Center, Paradise, Nevada, U.S.	Retained WBC International super featherweight title
49	Win	44–3–2	Jorge Solís	KO	8 (12), 1:16	Apr 14, 2007	28 years, 118 days	Alamodome, San Antonio, Texas, U.S.	Retained WBC International super featherweight title
48	Win	43–3–2	Érik Morales	KO	3 (12), 2:57	Nov 18, 2006	27 years, 336 days	Thomas & Mack Center, Paradise, Nevada, U.S.	Retained WBC International super featherweight title
47	Win	42–3–2	Óscar Larios	UD	12	Jul 2, 2006	27 years, 197 days	Araneta Coliseum, Quezon City, Metro Manila, Philippines	Retained WBC International super featherweight title
46	Win	41–3–2	Érik Morales	TKO	10 (12), 2:33	Jan 21, 2006	27 years, 35 days	Thomas & Mack Center, Paradise, Nevada, U.S.	Retained WBC International super featherweight title
45	Win	40–3–2	Héctor Velázquez	TKO	6 (12), 2:59	Sep 10, 2005	26 years, 267 days	Staples Center, Los Angeles, California, U.S.	Won vacant WBC International super featherweight title
44	Loss	39–3–2	Érik Morales	UD	12	Mar 19, 2005	26 years, 92 days	MGM Grand Garden Arena, Paradise, Nevada, U.S.	For IBA and vacant WBC International super featherweight titles
43	Win	39–2–2	Narongrit Pirang	KO	4 (12), 1:26	Dec 11, 2004	25 years, 360 days	MC Home Depot Open Air Arena, Taguig, Metro Manila, Philippines	Retained The Ring featherweight title
42	Draw	38–2–2	Juan Manuel Márquez	SD	12	May 8, 2004	25 years, 143 days	MGM Grand Garden Arena, Paradise, Nevada, U.S.	Retained The Ring featherweight title; For WBA (Unified) and IBF featherweight titles
41	Win	38–2–1	Marco Antonio Barrera	TKO	11 (12), 2:56	Nov 15, 2003	24 years, 333 days	Alamodome, San Antonio, Texas, U.S.	Won The Ring featherweight title
40	Win	37–2–1	Emmanuel Lucero	KO	3 (12), 0:48	Jul 26, 2003	24 years, 221 days	Grand Olympic Auditorium, Los Angeles, California, U.S.	Retained IBF super bantamweight title
39	Win	36–2–1	Serikzhan Yeshmagambetov	TKO	5 (10), 1:52	Mar 15, 2003	24 years, 88 days	Luna Park Quirino Grandstand, Manila, Metro Manila, Philippines	
38	Win	35–2–1	Fahprakorb Rakkiatgym	KO	1 (12), 2:46	Oct 26, 2002	23 years, 313 days	Rizal Memorial College Gym, Davao City, Davao del Sur, Philippines	Retained IBF super bantamweight title
37	Win	34–2–1	Jorge Eliécer Julio	TKO	2 (12), 1:09	Jun 8, 2002	23 years, 173 days	The Pyramid, Memphis, Tennessee, U.S.	Retained IBF super bantamweight title
36	Draw	33–2–1	Agapito Sánchez	TD	6 (12), 1:12	Nov 10, 2001	22 years, 328 days	Bill Graham Civic Auditorium, San Francisco, California, U.S.	Retained IBF super bantamweight title; For WBO super bantamweight title; Split TD: Pacquiao cut from an accidental head clash
35	Win	33–2	Lehlohonolo Ledwaba	TKO	6 (12), 0:59	Jun 23, 2001	22 years, 188 days	MGM Grand Garden Arena, Paradise, Nevada, U.S.	Won IBF super bantamweight title
34	Win	32–2	Foijan Prawet	KO	6 (12), 2:40	Apr 28, 2001	22 years, 132 days	Kidapawan, Cotabato, Philippines	Retained WBC International super bantamweight title
33	Win	31–2	Tetsutora Senrima	TKO	5 (12), 1:06	Feb 24, 2001	22 years, 69 days	Ynares Center, Antipolo, Rizal, Philippines	Retained WBC International super bantamweight title
32	Win	30–2	Nedal Hussein	TKO	10 (12), 1:48	Oct 14, 2000	21 years, 302 days	Ynares Center, Antipolo, Rizal, Philippines	Retained WBC International super bantamweight title
31	Win	29–2	Seung-Kon Chae	TKO	1 (12), 1:42	Jun 28, 2000	21 years, 194 days	Araneta Coliseum, Quezon City, Metro Manila, Philippines	Retained WBC International super bantamweight title
30	Win	28–2	Arnel Barotillo	KO	4 (12)	Mar 4, 2000	21 years, 78 days	Ninoy Aquino Stadium, Manila, Metro Manila, Philippines	Retained WBC International super bantamweight title
29	Win	27–2	Reynante Jamili	KO	2 (12)	Dec 18, 1999	21 years, 1 day	Elorde Sports Complex, Parañaque, Metro Manila, Philippines	Won vacant WBC International super bantamweight title
28	Loss	26–2	Medgoen Singsurat	TKO	3 (12), 1:32	Sep 17, 1999	20 years, 274 days	Pakpanag Metropolitan Stadium, Nakhon Si Thammarat, Nakhon Si Thammarat Province, Thailand	WBC flyweight title at stake only for Singsurat as Pacquiao missed weight
27	Win	26–1	Gabriel Mira	TKO	4 (12), 2:45	Apr 24, 1999	20 years, 128 days	Araneta Coliseum, Quezon City, Metro Manila, Philippines	Retained WBC flyweight title
26	Win	25–1	Todd Makelim	TKO	3 (10), 2:52	Feb 20, 1999	20 years, 65 days	Provincial Sports Complex, Kidapawan, Cotabato, Philippines	
25	Win	24–1	Chatchai Sasakul	KO	8 (12), 2:54	Dec 4, 1998	19 years, 352 days	Tonsuk College Ground, Bangkok, Thailand	Won WBC flyweight title
24	Win	23–1	Shin Terao	TKO	1 (10), 2:59	May 18, 1998	19 years, 152 days	Korakuen Hall, Tokyo, Japan	
23	Win	22–1	Narong Datchthuyawat	KO	1 (12), 1:38	Dec 6, 1997	18 years, 354 days	South Cotabato Stadium, Koronadal, South Cotabato, Philippines	Retained OPBF flyweight title
22	Win	21–1	Melvin Magramo	UD	10	Sep 13, 1997	18 years, 270 days	Coliseum, Cebu City, Cebu, Philippines	
21	Win	20–1	Chokchai Chockvivat	KO	5 (12), 2:46	Jun 26, 1997	18 years, 191 days	Mandaluyong, Metro Manila, Philippines	Won OPBF flyweight title
20	Win	19–1	Ariel Austria	TKO	6 (10)	May 30, 1997	18 years, 164 days	Almendras Gym, Davao City, Davao del Sur, Philippines	
19	Win	18–1	Wook-Ki Lee	KO	1 (10), 1:04	Apr 24, 1997	18 years, 128 days	Ritsy's, Makati, Metro Manila, Philippines	
18	Win	17–1	Mike Luna	KO	1 (10), 1:56	Mar 3, 1997	18 years, 76 days	Sucat, Muntinlupa, Metro Manila, Philippines	
17	Win	16–1	Sung-Yul Lee	TKO	2 (10), 1:51	Dec 28, 1996	18 years, 11 days	Alabang, Muntinlupa, Metro Manila, Philippines	
16	Win	15–1	Ippo Gala	TKO	2 (10)	Jul 27, 1996	17 years, 223 days	Mandaluyong City Sports Complex, Mandaluyong, Metro Manila, Philippines	
15	Win	14–1	Bert Batiller	TKO	4 (10)	Jun 15, 1996	17 years, 181 days	General Santos, South Cotabato, Philippines	
14	Win	13–1	John Medina	TKO	4 (10)	May 5, 1996	17 years, 140 days	Malabon, Metro Manila, Philippines	
13	Win	12–1	Marlon Carillo	UD	10	Apr 27, 1996	17 years, 132 days	Malate Midtown Ramada Hotel, Manila, Metro Manila Philippines	
12	Loss	11–1	Rustico Torrecampo	KO	3 (10), 0:29	Feb 9, 1996	17 years, 54 days	Mandaluyong, Metro Manila, Philippines	
11	Win	11–0	Lito Torrejos	TD	5 (10)	Jan 13, 1996	17 years, 27 days	Barangay Cupang Covered Court, Muntinlupa, Metro Manila, Philippines	Torrejos cut from an accidental head clash
10	Win	10–0	Rolando Toyogon	UD	10	Dec 9, 1995	16 years, 357 days	Padre Paredes Basketball Court, Manila, Metro Manila Philippines	
9	Win	9–0	Rudolfo Fernandez	TKO	3 (10)	Nov 11, 1995	16 years, 329 days	Mandaluyong, Metro Manila, Philippines	
8	Win	8–0	Renato Mendones	TKO	2 (8) 2:44	Oct 21, 1995	16 years, 308 days	Puerto Princesa, Palawan, Philippines	
7	Win	7–0	Lolito Laroa	UD	8	Oct 7, 1995	16 years, 294 days	Washington, Makati, Metro Manila, Philippines	
6	Win	6–0	Armando Rocil	KO	3 (8)	Sep 16, 1995	16 years, 273 days	Mandaluyong Sports Center, Mandaluyong, Metro Manila, Philippines	
5	Win	5–0	Acasio Simbajon	UD	6	Aug 3, 1995	16 years, 229 days	Mandaluyong Sports Center, Mandaluyong, Metro Manila, Philippines	
4	Win	4–0	Dele Desierto	TKO	2 (6), 2:41	Jul 1, 1995	16 years, 196 days	Mandaluyong, Metro Manila, Philippines	
3	Win	3–0	Rocky Palma	UD	6	May 1, 1995	16 years, 135 days	Montano Hall, Cavite City, Cavite, Philippines	
2	Win	2–0	Pinoy Montejo	UD	4	Mar 18, 1995	16 years, 91 days	Sablayan, Occidental Mindoro, Philippines	
1	Win	1–0	Edmund Enting Ignacio	UD	4	Jan 22, 1995	16 years, 36 days	Sablayan, Occidental Mindoro, Philippines	

== Exhibition boxing record ==
3 fights	2 wins	0 losses
By decision	2	0
Draws	1	

No.	Result	Record	Opponent	Type	Round, time	Date	Age	Location	Notes
3	Draw	2–0–1	Rukiya Anpo	D	3	Jul 28, 2024	45 years, 224 days	Saitama Super Arena, Saitama, Saitama Prefecture, Japan	Rizin Special standing bout rules
2	Win	2–0	DK Yoo	UD	6	Dec 11, 2022	43 years, 358 days	Korea International Exhibition Center, Goyang, Gyeonggi Province, South Korea	
1	Win	1–0	Jesus Salud	PTS	3	Aug 20, 2002	23 years, 246 days	Neal S. Blaisdell Arena, Honolulu, Hawaii, U.S.	

== Titles in boxing ==
=== Major world titles ===
- WBC flyweight champion (112 lb)
- IBF super bantamweight champion (122 lb)
- WBC super featherweight champion (130 lb)
- WBC lightweight champion (135 lb)
- WBO welterweight champion (147 lb) (3×)
- WBA (Super) welterweight champion (147 lb)
- WBC super welterweight champion (154 lb)

=== Secondary major world titles (Note: The secondary champion lineage lists the Regular or Unified champions while the primary champion is occupied.) ===
- WBA (Regular) welterweight champion (147 lb)

=== The Ring magazine titles ===
- The Ring featherweight champion (126 lbs)
- The Ring super featherweight champion (130 lbs)
- The Ring light welterweight champion (140 lbs)

=== Minor world titles ===
- IBO light welterweight champion (140 lb)

=== Lineal titles ===
- Lineal flyweight champion (112 lbs)
- Lineal featherweight champion (126 lbs)
- Lineal super featherweight champion (130 lbs)
- Lineal light welterweight champion (140 lbs)

=== Regional/International titles ===
- OPBF flyweight champion (112 lbs)
- WBC International super bantamweight champion (122 lbs)
- WBC International super featherweight champion (130 lbs)
- WBO International welterweight champion (147 lbs) (2×)

=== Honorary titles ===
- WBC Emeritus Champion
- WBC Diamond welterweight champion
- WBO Super Champion
- WBO Crystal champion
- WBO Super Diamond champion
- WBA Man of Triumph Rhodium champion
- WBO Legacy champion
- WBA Man of Triumph Gold champion
- WBA welterweight champion in recess
- WBA Centennial champion
- WBC Guerrero Azteca II champion
- WBCP Fighter of the Decade champion

== Boxing awards ==
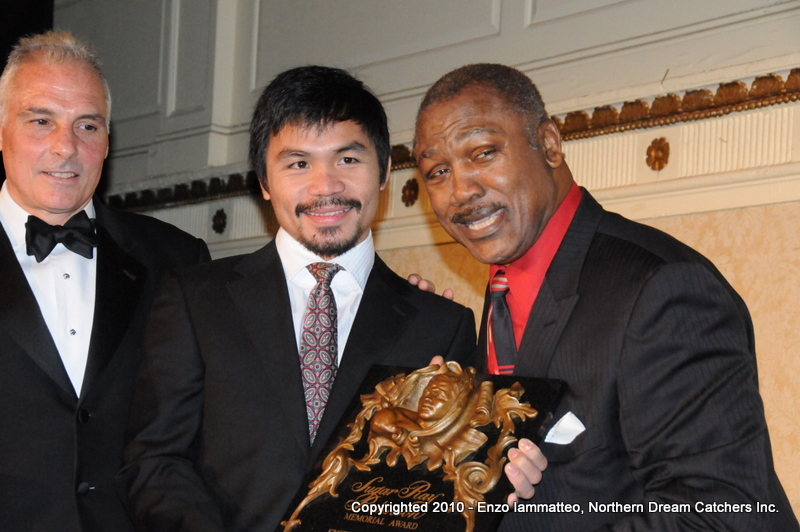
Wallace Matthew, Joe Frazier, and Manny Pacquiao whom holds the Sugar Ray Robinson memorial award.

- Best Fighter ESPY Award: 2009, 2011
- Sugar Ray Robinson Award: 2006, 2008, 2009
- The Ring magazine Fighter of the Year: 2006, 2008, 2009
- The Ring magazine Fighter of the Decade: 2000s
- Boxing Writers Association of America Fighter of the Decade: 2000s
- Asia Game Changer of the Year: 2015
- The BrandLaureate Legendary Award: 2018
- World Boxing News Fighter of the Year: 2019
- The Ring magazine Knockout of the Year: 2009
- PSA Athlete of the Year: 2002–2004, 2006, 2008
- Philippine Sportswriters Association Athlete of the Decade: 2000s
- The Ring magazine Comeback of the Year: 2013
- The Ring magazine Event of the Year: 2010, 2011, 2015
- World Boxing Organization Fighter of the Year: 2010
- World Boxing Organization Fighter of the Decade: 2000s
- HBO Fighter of the Decade: 2000s
- World Boxing Council Fighter of the Decade: 2000s
- World Boxing Council Boxer of the Year: 2008, 2009
- World Boxing Council Comeback of the Year: 2025
- ESPN Fighter of the Year: 2006, 2008, 2009
- ESPN Knockout of the Year: 2009
- Sports Illustrated Boxer of the Year: 2008
- Sports Illustrated Fighter of the Year: 2009
- Yahoo! Sports Fighter of the Year: 2008
- BoxingScene Fighter of the Year: 2006, 2008, 2009
- WBN Boxing Comeback of the Year: 2025
- Global Outstanding Sporting Career Award: 2026

== Pay-per-view bouts ==
=== PPV home television ===
The following fights were broadcast on pay-per-view television.

==== United States ====
No.	Date	Fight	Billing	Buys	Network	Revenue
1	March 19, 2005	Morales vs. Pacquiao	Coming with Everything	350,000	HBO	$15,700,000
2	January 21, 2006	Morales vs. Pacquiao II	The Battle	360,000	HBO	$16,200,000
3	July 2, 2006	Pacquiao vs. Larios	Mano-A-Mano	120,000	Top Rank	$4,794,000
4	November 18, 2006	Pacquiao vs. Morales III	The Grand Finale	350,000	HBO	$17,500,000
5	April 14, 2007	Pacquiao vs. Solís	Blaze of Glory	150,000	Top Rank	$5,992,000
6	October 6, 2007	Pacquiao vs. Barrera II	Will to Win	350,000	HBO	$17,532,000
7	March 15, 2008	Pacquiao vs. Márquez II	Unfinished Business	400,000	HBO	$20,533,000
8	June 28, 2008	Pacquiao vs. Díaz	Lethal Combination	206,000	HBO	$9,260,000
9	December 6, 2008	De La Hoya vs. Pacquiao	The Dream Match	1,250,000	HBO	$70,000,000
10	May 2, 2009	Pacquiao vs. Hatton	The Battle of East and West	850,000	HBO	$50,000,000
11	November 14, 2009	Pacquiao vs. Cotto	Firepower	1,250,000	HBO	$70,000,000
12	March 13, 2010	Pacquiao vs. Clottey	The Event	700,000	HBO	$35,300,000
13	November 13, 2010	Pacquiao vs. Margarito	The Eighth Wonder of the World	1,150,000	HBO	$64,000,000
14	May 17, 2011	Pacquiao vs. Mosley	The Undaunted	1,340,000	Showtime	$75,000,000
15	November 8, 2011	Pacquiao vs. Márquez III	The 25th Round Begins	1,400,000	HBO	$71,000,000
16	June 9, 2012	Pacquiao vs. Bradley	Perfect Storm	900,000	HBO	$50,600,000
17	December 8, 2012	Pacquiao vs. Márquez IV	Fight of the Decade	1,150,000	HBO	$70,000,000
18	November 24, 2013	Pacquiao vs. Ríos	The Clash in Cotai	475,000	HBO	$30,000,000
19	April 12, 2014	Pacquiao vs. Bradley II	Vindication	800,000	HBO	$49,000,000
20	November 23, 2014	Pacquiao vs. Algieri	Hungry for Glory	400,000	HBO	$24,000,000
21	May 2, 2015	Mayweather Jr. vs. Pacquiao	Fight of the Century	4,600,000	Showtime & HBO	$400,000,000
22	April 9, 2016	Pacquiao vs. Bradley III	The Legacy Fight	400,000	HBO	$24,000,000
23	November 5, 2016	Pacquiao vs. Vargas	The Legend/The Champ	300,000	Top Rank	$18,000,000
24	January 19, 2019	Pacquiao vs. Broner	Return to Vegas	400,000	Showtime	$30,000,000
25	July 20, 2019	Pacquiao vs. Thurman	Welterweight Supremacy	500,000	Fox	$37,500,000
26	August 21, 2021	Pacquiao vs. Ugás	The Legend vs. The Olympian	250,000	Fox	$18,750,000
27	December 11, 2022	Pacquiao vs. Yoo	Pacman vs. DK	—N/a	FITE TV	—N/a
28	July 19, 2025	Pacquiao vs. Barrios	Pacquiao Returns	—N/a	Amazon Prime	—N/a
		Total sales		20,401,000		$1,294,661,000

==== United Kingdom ====
Date	Fight	Network	Buys	Source
May 2, 2009	Manny Pacquiao vs. Ricky Hatton	Sky Box Office	900,000	
May 2, 2015	Floyd Mayweather Jr. vs. Manny Pacquiao	Sky Box Office	942,000	
	Total sales	Sky Box Office	1,842,000	

=== Closed-circuit theatre TV ===
The following fight was telecast at American closed-circuit theatre TV venues.

Date	Fight	Buys	Revenue
May 2, 2015	Floyd Mayweather Jr. vs. Manny Pacquiao	173,000	$25,900,000

== Boxing Hall of Fame ==
Filipinos in the International Boxing Hall of Fame

Number	Name	Year inducted	Notes
1	Flash Elorde	1993	NBA Super featherweight (130), The Ring Super Featherweight (130), & WBC Super featherweight (130) Champion. the first Filipino boxer who ever inducted on the International Boxing Hall of Fame. Holds the record at super featherweight division for longest title reign, spanning seven years. "Modern inductee"
2	Pancho Villa	1994	NYSAC Flyweight (112), NBA Flyweight (112), The Ring Flyweight (112) Champion. First Filipino/Asian World Champion. "Old-timer inductee"
3	Lope Sarreal	2005	Asia's leading promoter, manager, and international booking agent in the years that followed World War II. Also Known as the "Grand Old Man of Philippine Boxing" produced 22 world champions during his illustrious career."Non-participants"
4	Manny Pacquiao	2025	First and only boxer to win twelve major world titles in eight different weight divisions –Flyweight (112), Super bantamweight (122), Featherweight (126), Super featherweight (130), Lightweight (135), Light welterweight (140), Welterweight (147) & Super welterweight (154), his achievements remain unparallel in the history of boxing. Also became the oldest welterweight champion in 2019 with a win against WBA champ Keith Thurman."Modern inductee"

= Indicates the person is no longer alive

== See also ==
- List of flyweight boxing champions
- List of super bantamweight boxing champions
- List of super featherweight boxing champions
- List of lightweight boxing champions
- List of welterweight boxing champions
- List of light middleweight boxing champions
- List of Filipino boxing world champions
- List of left-handed boxers

== Notes and references ==
=== References ===
Sporting positions
Regional boxing titles
Preceded by Chokchai Chockvivat	OPBF flyweight champion June 26, 1997 – December 4, 1998; Vacated	Vacant Title next held by Melvin Magramo
Vacant Title last held by Ahmad Fandi	WBC International super bantamweight champion December 18, 1999 – June 23, 2001; Vacated	Vacant Title next held by Napapol Sor Rungvisai
Vacant Title last held by Érik Morales	WBC International super featherweight champion September 10, 2005 – March 15, 2008; Won world title	Vacant Title next held by Yuriorkis Gamboa
New title	WBO International welterweight champion November 24, 2013 – April 12, 2014; Won world title	Vacant Title next held by Juan Manuel Márquez
Vacant Title last held by Brandon Ríos	WBO International welterweight champion April 9 – November 5, 2016; Won world title	Vacant Title next held by Lucas Matthysse
Minor world boxing titles
Preceded by Ricky Hatton	IBO light welterweight champion May 2, 2009 – January 15, 2010; Vacated	Vacant Title next held by Kaizer Mabuza
Major world boxing titles
Preceded by Chatchai Sasakul	WBC flyweight champion December 4, 1998 – September 16, 1999; Stripped	Vacant Title next held by Medgoen Singsurat
Preceded by Lehlohonolo Ledwaba	IBF super bantamweight champion June 23, 2001 – January 16, 2004; Vacated	Vacant Title next held by Israel Vázquez
Preceded by Marco Antonio Barrera	The Ring featherweight champion November 15, 2003 – June 18, 2005; Vacated	Vacant Title next held by Mikey García
Preceded by Juan Manuel Márquez	WBC super featherweight champion March 15 – July 16, 2008; Vacated	Vacant Title next held by Humberto Soto
Vacant Title last held by Brian Mitchell	The Ring super featherweight champion March 15 – July 2008; Vacated	Vacant Title next held by Shakur Stevenson
Preceded by David Díaz	WBC lightweight champion June 28, 2008 – February 24, 2009; Vacated	Vacant Title next held by Edwin Valero
Preceded by Ricky Hatton	The Ring light welterweight champion May 2, 2009 – July 26, 2010; Vacated	Vacant Title next held by Danny García
Preceded by Miguel Cotto	WBO welterweight champion November 14, 2009 – June 9, 2012	Succeeded by Timothy Bradley
Vacant Title last held by Sergio Martínez	WBC super welterweight champion November 13, 2010 – February 8, 2011; Stripped	Vacant Title next held by Canelo Álvarez
Preceded by Timothy Bradley	WBO welterweight champion April 12, 2014 – May 2, 2015	Succeeded by Floyd Mayweather Jr.
Preceded by Jessie Vargas	WBO welterweight champion November 5, 2016 – July 2, 2017	Succeeded by Jeff Horn
Preceded by Lucas Matthysse	WBA welterweight champion Regular title July 15, 2018 – July 20, 2019; Won Super title	Vacant Title next held by Yordenis Ugás
Preceded by Keith Thurman	WBA welterweight champion Super title July 20, 2019 – January 29, 2021; Status changed	Succeeded by Yordenis Ugás
Honorary boxing titles
New title	WBA welterweight champion In recess January 29 – August 21, 2021; Failed to regain title	Vacant
Awards
Previous: Floyd Mayweather Jr.	ESPN Fighter of the Year; 2008, 2009	Next: Sergio Martínez
Previous: Edison Miranda; KO3 David Banks	The Ring Knockout of the Year; KO2 Ricky Hatton; 2009	Next: Sergio Martínez; KO2 Paul Williams
Previous: Floyd Mayweather Jr.	Best Fighter ESPY Award; 2009	Next: Floyd Mayweather Jr.
Previous: Floyd Mayweather Jr.	Best Fighter ESPY Award; 2011	Next: Floyd Mayweather Jr.
Previous: Roy Jones Jr.	BWAA Fighter of the Decade; 2000s	Next: Floyd Mayweather Jr.
Previous: Andre Berto vs. Victor Ortiz	The Ring Fight of the Year vs. Juan Manuel Márquez IV; 2012	Next: Timothy Bradley vs. Ruslan Provodnikov
Previous: James Kirkland vs. Alfredo Angulo; Round 1	The Ring Round of the Year vs. Juan Manuel Márquez IV; Round 5; 2012	Next: Timothy Bradley vs. Ruslan Provodnikov; Round 6
Previous: Daniel Jacobs	The Ring Comeback of the Year; 2013	Next: Miguel Cotto
Achievements
Preceded by Floyd Mayweather Jr.	The Ring pound for pound No. 1 boxer June 9, 2008 – May 7, 2012	Vacant Title next held by Floyd Mayweather Jr.
Records
Preceded by Oscar De La Hoya; 6 divisions	World champion in most divisions 8 divisions November 13, 2010 – present 7th on November 14, 2009	Incumbent
Preceded by Bob Fitzsimmons; 3 divisions	Lineal champion in most divisions 4 divisions May 2, 2009 – present Equaled by Floyd Mayweather Jr. and Terence Crawford	Incumbent
Preceded by Bob Fitzsimmons; 3 divisions	World champion in most glamour divisions 4 divisions November 14, 2009–present	Incumbent
Preceded by Shane Mosley; Age 38	Oldest world welterweight champion Age 41; July 20, 2019–present Unofficially broke the record by winning the WBA (Regular) title on July 15, 2018, at age 39	Incumbent
Preceded by Jack Britton; Emile Griffith; Antonio Margarito; Floyd Mayweather Jr. 3	Most world title reigns in welterweight division 4 July 20, 2019 – present	Incumbent
Preceded by Evander Holyfield; 3 decades	World champion in most decades 4 decades January 1, 2020 – present 1990s, 2000s, 2010s, and 2020s	Incumbent
