= Rustico =

Rustico may refer to:

- Rustico (pastry), Italian snack of Salento made with puff pastry and a stuffing
- Rustico Torrecampo (born 1972), Filipino boxer

== See also ==
- North Rustico, town in Queens County, Prince Edward Island, Canada
- Rustico-Emerald, provincial electoral district in Prince Edward Island, Canada
- Rustico Farm & Cellars, heritage building in British Columbia, Canada
