= Floyd Mayweather Jr. vs. Manny Pacquiao II =

Proposed boxing match in Las Vegas

- Original Netflix promotional poster
- Date: September 19, 2026 (later indefinitely postponed)
- Venue: Sphere, Paradise, Nevada (original plan)

Tale of the tape
Boxer	Floyd Mayweather Jr.	Manny Pacquiao
Nickname	Money	Pac-Man
Hometown	Grand Rapids, Michigan, U.S.	General Santos, South Cotabato, Philippines
Pre-fight record	50–0 (27 KO)	62–8–3 (39 KO)
Age	49 years, 6 months	47 years, 9 months
Height	5 ft 8 in (173 cm)	5 ft 5 1/2 in (166 cm)
Style	Orthodox	Southpaw
Recognition	5-division world champion	8-division world champion

Floyd Mayweather Jr. vs. Manny Pacquiao II is a proposed professional boxing match contested between five-division world champion Floyd Mayweather Jr. and eight-division world champion Manny Pacquiao.

They had previously met in 2015, where Mayweather won by unanimous decision. Originally scheduled to take place on September 26, 2026, the bout was postponed due to legal and contractual disputes involving Mayweather, with a new date to be announced in 2027.

== Background and buildup ==
=== Previous fights ===
Floyd Mayweather Jr. and Manny Pacquiao have previously fought each other in the Fight of the Century match on May 2, 2015. The upcoming rematch will see both boxers in their late-40s.

Mayweather's last professional match was against Ultimate Fighting Championship fighter Conor McGregor in August 2017 before announcing his latest retirement. He has since fought in eight exhibition matches including the one with Logan Paul. In the lead up to Mayweather's planned upcoming exhibition match against Mike Tyson in the Congo in April 2026 (which was later postponed), Mayweather announced on February 20 his return to professional boxing for at least one official match.

Pacquiao retired in 2022 after failing to win the WBA welterweight title from Yordenis Ugas. He fought in two exhibition matches in between a failed launched a presidential bid in 2022 and to get re-elected as Senator in the May 2025 election. Pacquiao then came out of retirement to fight Mario Barrios on July 20 for the WBC welterweight belt. The fight ended in a majority draw. Pacquiao was scheduled to fight Ruslan Provodnikov in an exhibition match on April 8, 2026, but did not do so.

=== Match details ===
The rematch fight between Mayweather and Pacquiao was announced on February 23, 2026, by Netflix. Netflix will livestream the event. The match will be held at the Sphere in Paradise, Nevada and will be the first ever professional boxing match in the venue. It will be co-promoted by MP Promotions and Mayweather Promotions, in partnership with CSI Sports/Fight Sports. The scheduled fight was clarified to be official and not be an exhibition match meaning that Pacquiao could potentially break Mayweather's undefeated record. On April 30, it was reported that the event would no longer take place at the Sphere, but instead take place at another venue in Las Vegas. A week later the date was pushed back, a week later, to September 26, 2026. On May 7, Mayweather held a press conference to promote his upcoming exhibition against Greek kickboxer Mike Zambidis, scheduled for June 27. He also responded to the negative media coverage regarding his financial status, stating that he was not in financial trouble, despite ongoing lawsuits. He suggested a deal with Pacquiao might be finalized within 48 hours. On June 25, Pacquiao confirmed that the rematch had been postponed indefinitely.

==== Mayweather's claim of an exhibition match ====
On March 28, Mayweather spoke to Vegas Sports Today. He stated that the fight’s exact location was undecided, despite the Sphere venue being mentioned as a possibility. Nothing was confirmed. Mayweather then claimed the fight was an exhibition and not a professional bout, as previously stated. On April 2, Jas Mathur, CEO of Manny Pacquiao Promotions, stated that the fight was never discussed as an exhibition since negotiations began. He stated that Mayweather's statements contradicted the contract with Manny Pacquiao Promotions, Netflix, and MSG. The parties involved were surprised and displeased by Mayweather’s position. Pacquiao was keen on a legitimate professional rematch, not an exhibition. According to Mathur, Mayweather had already accepted cash advances and a significant loan based on a professional fight contract. Mathur also stated that Mayweather had to provide written confirmation of intent to fulfil the contract by the end of the day.

In April, it was reported that Mayweather could incur a 9-figure loss if he canceled the rematch. Pacquiao's team also claimed that another exhibition match between Floyd Mayweather and Mike Zambidis to take place in Greece was a breach of contract. Pacquiao insisted that he would only sign a contract after Mayweather signed first. Pacquiao also assured that alternatives would be explored should Mayweather withdraw, with backup plans featuring other boxers. Pacquiao announced later in the month that Mayweather formally agreed that the rematch would be a professional match, and that Mayweather's undefeated record would be on the line.

=== Reception to the planned match ===
British hall of fame promoter Frank Warren was disinterested about the announcement of the fight. He stated that he had no enthusiasm for watching two older fighters compete again, meaning it lacked legitimacy, comparing it to his lack of interest in the professional bout between Mike Tyson and Jake Paul. He said, “I have no interest in a 47-year-old fighting a 49-year-old.” He also hoped the bout would not be sanctioned by any official governing bodies.

== Legal issues ==
In June 2026, Mayweather was named as a defendant in a civil lawsuit filed by CSI Sports Events in the United States District Court for the Southern District of New York. The lawsuit alleged breach of contract in relation to a proposed exhibition bout against former heavyweight champion Mike Tyson and a potential professional rematch with Pacquiao.

According to the complaint, CSI Sports had entered into an agreement in August 2025 to promote an exhibition fight between Mayweather and Tyson, for which Mayweather was to receive a reported purse of $14 million, including a $2 million advance payment. The suit further stated that, in November 2025, the parties entered into a separate exclusive agreement covering a subsequent bout following the Tyson fight, under which Mayweather was expected to face Pacquiao. The financial terms of that agreement were reported to include a guaranteed purse of $35 million plus a share of pay-per-view revenue, or a $50 million buyout if the bout was not staged as a pay-per-view event. Provisions were also included for an alternative opponent, with a reported purse of $20 million plus additional incentives, should Pacquiao be unavailable.

CSI alleged that Mayweather breached the exclusivity provisions of these agreements by agreeing to participate in an unrelated exhibition bout against Greek kickboxer Mike Zambidis, which was scheduled to take place in June 2026 in Greece. The promoter claimed that this arrangement conflicted with its contractual rights to Mayweather’s fights and sought to block the bout by filing for injunctive relief. CSI, through its attorney Judd Burstein, indicated that it intended to pursue an emergency injunction to prevent the Zambidis fight from taking place. DAZN later pulled the exhibition fight against Zambidis off its schedule and Ticketmaster stopped ticket sales. On June 25, the exhibition was called off. Attorney Melissa Glass, who confirmed this in a letter to the courts, stated the exhibition could be rescheduled, depending on the outcome the injunction ruling. On July 3, it was reported that a federal judge denied CSI’s attempt to prevent Mayweather from fighting Zambidis. The ruling from Judge Vernon S. Broderick was that CSI had not shown the required “irreparable harm” needed to block the exhibition.

The lawsuit also alleged that Mayweather had engaged in parallel negotiations with third parties, including entering into a separate agreement in December 2025 with another company for a prospective fight with Pacquiao, reportedly valued at $24.75 million, with additional bonuses and advance payments. CSI contended that these actions undermined its contractual position and demonstrated that Mayweather was in the process of selling those same rights to a third party.

In addition to seeking injunctive relief, CSI Sports requested financial damages of approximately $6.65 million and named Frist Apex Ventures, which it alleged acted as Mayweather’s representative in negotiations, as a co-defendant in the case. In a separate civil action, Mayweather was reported to have filed claims against Frist Apex Ventures for alleged fiduciary breaches. At the time the lawsuit was reported, representatives for Mayweather had not issued a public response to the allegations.
