= Manny Pacquiao vs. DK Yoo =

2022 boxing match

Pacman vs. DK
- Date: December 11, 2022
- Venue: Korea International Exhibition Center, Goyang, South Korea

Tale of the tape
Boxer	Manny Pacquiao	DK Yoo
Nickname	Pac-Man	Burning
Hometown	General Santos, Philippines	Seoul, South Korea
Pre-fight record	62–8–2 (39 KO)	N/A
Height	5 ft 5 1/2 in (166 cm)	5 ft 10 in (178 cm)
Weight	73.1 kg (161 lb)	78.9 kg (174 lb)
Style	Southpaw	Southpaw
Recognition	8-division world champion	(none)

Result
- Pacquiao wins via 6-round unanimous decision

Manny Pacquiao vs. DK Yoo, billed as "Pacman vs. DK", was an exhibition boxing match contested between former eight-division world champion Manny Pacquiao and martial artist DK Yoo. The fight took place on December 11, 2022.

== Background ==
An exhibition match featuring Manny Pacquiao, a retired Filipino professional boxer who was a former eight-division world champion, and South Korean YouTuber DK Yoo was organized. The former's last bout prior to his retirement was Manny Pacquiao vs. Yordenis Ugás on August 21, 2021. Pacquiao lost his fight against Yordenis Ugás via a unanimous decision. Pacquiao, who was also an incumbent senator at the time, retired from professional boxing to focus on his presidential campaign for the 2022 Philippine elections. Pacquiao lost the election. Pacquiao has clarified that the match should not be interpreted as him coming out of retirement.

Yoo, aside from being an internet personality, is a self-defense instructor and martial artist practitioner himself. He has previously fought mixed-martial artist Brad Scott in a non-scoring match.

The fight had a format of six rounds of two minutes each instead of the customary four rounds of three minutes each. There is no agreed weight limit imposed on both fighters. This places Pacquiao at a disadvantage in terms of weight. In the weigh-in on December 10, Pacquiao had a recorded weight of 73.1 kilograms (161 lb) while Yoo's weight was measured to be 78.9 kilograms (174 lb).

All the proceeds of the match will go to charity, with the beneficiaries being families affected by the 2022 Russian invasion of Ukraine and the homeless in the Philippines. Part of the proceeds will go to the Filipino boxer's charity, the Pacquiao Foundation which builds houses for indigents.

The bout was held at the Korea International Exhibition Center in Goyang, South Korea on December 11, 2022. Pacquiao won over Yoo via a unanimous decision. The win does not affect Pacquiao's professional record.

== Fight card ==
Weight class		vs.		Method	Round	Time	Notes
Catchweight	(Philippines) Manny Pacquiao	def.	(South Korea) DK Yoo	UD	6 (6)		Exhibition match
	(United States) Nico Hernandez	def.	(South Korea) Jae-young Kim	UD	8 (8)
	(South Korea) Min-wook Kim	def.	(United States) Marcus Davidson	TKO	5	2:55
	(United States) Abel Mendoza	vs.	(South Korea) Min-guk Ju	SD
	(South Korea) Seung-ho Yang	def.	(United States) Sean Garcia	MD

== Broadcasting ==
Country	Broadcaster			
Country	Free-to-air	Cable/Pay TV	PPV	Stream
Worldwide	—N/a	—N/a	FITE	—N/a
Philippines	All TV	SkyCable; Cablelink; Cignal TV	FITE	Tap GO

== See also ==
- Floyd Mayweather Jr. vs. Logan Paul
