= Quintuple champion =

Winner of five titles or other distinctions

In different sports an athlete who wins five crowns, titles, medals, belts, or other distinctions is called a Quintuple Champion.

== Boxing ==
In boxing, a quintuple champion is a boxer who has won world titles in at least five different weight classes.

The first man in boxing to earn this distinction was Thomas Hearns on November 4, 1988. Hearns won first the Welterweight (147 lbs) title, later annexed the Super Welterweight (154 lbs) belt. Rather than win the next closest division in weight, the Middleweight (160 lbs), he moved up three divisions to earn the Light Heavyweight (175 lbs) title. He moved down in weight to net the Middleweight (160 lbs) crown and finally moved back in weight up to Super Middleweight (168 lbs) to become the first Quintuple Champion in the history of boxing.

Since then some boxers have won six titles and become the Sextuple champions.

== World's Strongest Man ==
Mariusz Pudzianowski is the only man to have won the World's Strongest Man title five times.

== Formula One ==
Juan Manuel Fangio is a five-time Formula One World Champion.

== Motorcycle racing ==
Mick Doohan won five consecutive 500 cc World Championships starting in 1994.

== MMA ==
Cris Cyborg is the only fighter, male or female, to become a Quintuple Champion in MMA, winning belts in the UFC, Bellator MMA, Invicta FC, Strikeforce, and PFL.

== See also ==
- List of boxing triple champions
- List of boxing quadruple champions
- List of boxing quintuple champions
- List of boxing sextuple champions
- List of boxing septuple champions
- Octuple champion
- List of The Ring world champions
- List of WBC world champions
- List of WBA world champions
- List of IBF world champions
- List of WBO world champions
- List of IBO world champions
