= Rustico Torrecampo =

Filipino boxer

Personal information
- Nationality: (Philippines) Filipino
- Born: Escolastico P. Torrecampo; August 1, 1972 (age 54) Davao City, Davao del Sur, Philippines
- Height: 157 cm (5 ft 2 in)
- Weight: Flyweight; Light flyweight

Boxing career
- Stance: Orthodox

Boxing record
- Total fights: 29
- Wins: 15
- Win by KO: 8
- Losses: 8
- Draws: 6

Rustico Torrecampo (born 1 August 1972 in Davao City, Philippines) is a retired Filipino professional boxer. He was the first fighter to defeat boxing legend and Hall of Famer Manny Pacquiao.

== Personal life ==
Torrecampo is the fifth of eight siblings and is a high school drop-out, completing just his freshman year. His father, Escolastico Torrecampo Sr., was killed by New People's Army guerrillas in Davao City in 1985. Torrecampo is married to Cecille Camposano; they have three children, Ruscel Carl, Carisa Rose and Rich Cymoun. He lived with his extended family in Tondo, Manila.

After retiring from boxing, Torrecampo worked at a factory in Quezon City. In 2006, he quit the job and became an ambulant vendor, selling food out of a bicycle cart in Tondo. In 2007, he was wanted for murder in the stabbing death of a garbage truck driver who allegedly hit his food cart, spilling his wares onto the street. In 2011, Torrecampo was out on bail pending court hearings to resolve his case.

== Professional boxing career ==
Torrecampo fought in the light flyweight division from 1993 to 1997 and retired with 14 wins, 8 losses and 5 draws. On 9 February 1996, he fought Manny Pacquiao, who at that time held an 11-win, 0-loss record, in Mandaluyong, Manila. Pacquiao failed to make weight and was penalized by being made to wear eight-ounce gloves; Torrecampo wore six-ounce gloves. Torrecampo controlled the first two rounds and knocked out Pacquiao in the third round with a overhand left to the jaw as Pacquiao was coming in.

"When he went down, I knew he wouldn't get up. The referee could've counted to 100 and he wouldn't have been able to recover. I prepared for him. I knew after throwing a jab, he would follow up with a straight or an uppercut. I waited for him to jab, then I countered."

— Rustico Torrecampo, quoted from an interview

A month after his victory over Pacquiao, Torrecampo broke his left wrist during another boxing match; he never went to a doctor for treatment. He retired in 1997; the improperly-healed fracture leaving a small bone sticking out of his left wrist. Torrecampo's biggest paycheck was a Php 30,000.00 purse for a fight in either Thailand or South Korea. His purse from the Pacquiao fight earned him Php 6,500.00 and his largest local paycheck was Php 17,000.00 for a bout he lost in General Santos.

=== Return to professional boxing ===
In 2011, Torrecampo came out of retirement after 14 years. He won his first comeback fight against a younger opponent via a third-round knockout.

== Professional boxing record ==
15 Wins (8 knockouts), 8 Loss, 6 draws
Res.	Record	Opponent	Type	Round Time	Date	Location	Notes
Win	15–8–6	(Philippines) Jovanie Bualan	KO	3 (12)	2011-02-19	(Philippines) Imus Plaza Covered Court, Imus, Cavite	
Loss	14–8–6	(Philippines) Archie Villamor	TKO	4 (10)	1997-02-09	(Philippines) Mandaluyong, Metro Manila	
Draw	14–7–6	(Philippines) Jaime Aliguin	TD	2 (10)	1997-01-13	(Philippines) Florante Boy Aquino Stadium, San Pablo City, Laguna	Fight stopped due to accidental clash of heads.
Loss	14–7–5	(Philippines) Alpong Navaja	UD	10	1996-11-23	(Philippines) Mandaue City, Cebu	
Loss	14–6–5	(South Korea) Yong-Soon Chang	TD	5 (10)	1996-09-14	South Korea	
Win	14–5–5	(Philippines) Noel Tunacao	TKO	6 (10)	1996-06-22	(Philippines) Mandaue City, Cebu	
Loss	13–5–5	(Philippines) Leo Ramirez	UD	12	1996-05-05	(Philippines) General Santos	For Philippines Games and Amusement Board light flyweight title.
Win	13–4–5	(Philippines) Ricky Sales	PTS	10	1996-03-20	(Philippines) Narra, Palawan	Torrecampo fractured left hand during the fight.
Win	12–4–5	(Philippines) Manny Pacquiao	KO	3 (10)	1996-02-09	(Philippines) Mandaluyong, Metro Manila	
Win	11–4–5	(Philippines) Nick Caintoy	TKO	4 (10)	1996-01-06	(Philippines) Narra, Palawan	
Loss	10–4–5	(Thailand) Ritichai Kiatprapas	TKO	5 (10)	1995-08-16	Bangkok, Thailand	
Win	10–3–5	(Philippines) Reynante Rojo	TKO	8 (10)	1995-07-01	(Philippines) Mandaluyong, Metro Manila	
Draw	9–3–5	(Philippines) Alpong Navaja	TD	8 (10)	1995-05-06	(Philippines) Makati, Metro Manila	
Draw	9–3–4	(Philippines) Nathan Barcelona	TD	3 (10)	1995-03-25	(Philippines) Biñan Town Plaza, Biñan, Laguna	
Win	9–3–3	(Philippines) Marvin Corpuz	TKO	6 (10)	1995-03-06	(Philippines) Barangay Palanan, Makati, Metro Manila	
Draw	8–3–3	(Philippines) Rodel Magallanes	SD	6	1995-01-21	(Philippines) Barangay Bangkal, Makati, Metro Manila	
Win	8–3–2	(Philippines) Chris Galon	UD	8	1994-12-03	(Philippines) Mandaluyong, Metro Manila	
Win	7–3–2	(Philippines) Mario Sajulan	KO	6 (10)	1994-09-29	(Philippines) Elorde Sports Center, Parañaque, Metro Manila	
Win	6–3–2	(Philippines) Rodel Magallanes	UD	8	1994-08-18	(Philippines) Elorde Sports Center, Parañaque, Metro Manila	
Loss	5–3–2	(Philippines) Edmund Villamor	TKO	4 (8)	1994-01-08	(Philippines) Cebu City, Cebu	
Draw	5–2–2	(Philippines) Jun Jun Tomagan	SD	6	1993-12-16	(Philippines) Manila Midtown Ramada Hotel, Malate, Manila	
Loss	5–2–1	(Philippines) Ramie Navarrete	TKO	1 (4)	1993-10-15	(Philippines) Cavite Coliseum, Bacoor, Cavite	
Win	5–1–1	(Philippines) Jun Jun Tomagan	UD	6	1993-09-18	(Philippines) San Andres Civic and Sports Center, Malate, Manila	
Win	4–1–1	(Philippines) Baby Lorona Jr	TKO	1 (6)	1993-09-11	(Philippines) Araneta Coliseum, Quezon City, Metro Manila	
Win	3–1–1	(Philippines) Bernardo Jun Davalos	TD	5 (6)	1993-07-30	(Philippines) Araneta Coliseum, Quezon City, Metro Manila	
Win	2–1–1	(Philippines) Jun Jun Tomagan	SD	6	1993-07-14	(Philippines) Elorde Sports Center, Parañaque, Metro Manila	
Win	1–1–1	(Philippines) Manuel Andales	UD	4	1993-06-17	(Philippines) Cuneta Astrodome, Pasay, Metro Manila	
Loss	0–1–1	(Philippines) Ramie Navarrete	TKO	1 (4)	1993-04-28	(Philippines) Parañaque, Metro Manila	
Draw	0–0–1	(Philippines) Julie Tagalog	SD	4	1993-03-25	(Philippines) Ninoy Aquino Stadium, Malate, Manila	Professional boxing debut at Light flyweight.

== Media portrayals ==
- Portrayed by Alwin Lasutan, a Filipino actor, in the 2015 biographical sports drama film, Kid Kulafu.
