= T. J. Quinn =

American investigative reporter

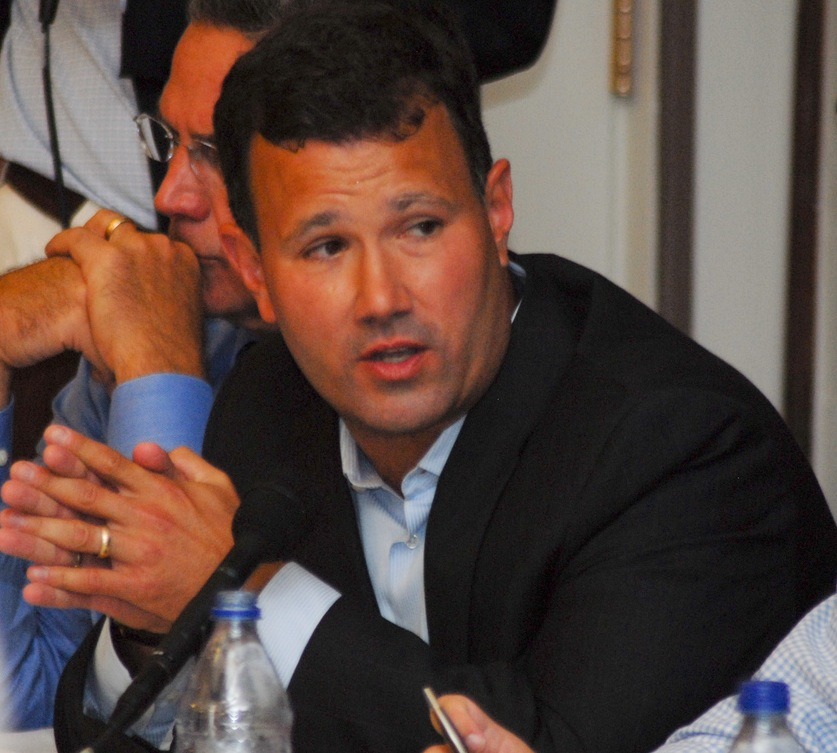
Quinn in 2008.

Thomas Joseph Quinn is an American investigative reporter for ESPN and a fill-in host for Outside the Lines.

== Early life ==
Quinn was born in New York City; his father Tom Quinn was a champion boxer at Georgetown University and later a character actor. Quinn later moved to Alexandria, Virginia and wrote for the student newspaper while attending Fort Hunt High School, before the school merged with West Potomac High School.

== Career ==
Quinn graduated from the University of Missouri School of Journalism with a Bachelor of Journalism degree in 1991. He began his journalism career as a news reporter for the Daily Southtown in Chicago. From 1992 to 1994, Quinn covered school boards and city councils in south suburbs of Chicago for Southtown. Then, Quinn moved to the Salt Lake Tribune in Salt Lake City and spent a year there reporting on local politics before returning to the Southtown in 1996 to cover the Chicago White Sox.

In 1998 and 1999, Quinn covered the New York Mets for the Bergen Record in New Jersey. Quinn achieved his dream of working for the New York Daily News in 2000, again covering the Mets. In 2002, he joined the Daily News' sports investigative team. Quinn joined ESPN in November 2007 as an investigative reporter for ESPN's Enterprise Unit. Quinn contributes to several ESPN programs including SportsCenter and Outside the Lines.

He was also an adjunct professor at the Columbia University Graduate School of Journalism.
