= List of boxing sextuple champions =

A sextuple champion in boxing refers to a boxer who has won world titles in six different weight classes.

== Recognition ==
=== Major sanctioning bodies ===
There is some dispute on which sanctioning body is considered "major" enough to award championships. The "Big 4" sanctioning bodies are always included. They are arranged in order of foundation:

- World Boxing Association (WBA) - founded in 1921
- World Boxing Council (WBC) - founded in 1963
- International Boxing Federation (IBF) - founded in 1983
- World Boxing Organization (WBO) - founded in 1988

==== The Ring ====
The Ring, boxing's most respected magazine, has awarded world championships in professional boxing within each weight class from its foundation in 1922 until the 1990s, and again since 2001. The Ring champions were at one point held the linear reign to the throne, the man who beat the man. The lineal champion is also known as the true champion of the division. The Ring stopped giving belts to world champions in the 1990s but began again in 2002.

In 2002, The Ring attempted to clear up the confusion regarding world champions by creating a championship policy. It echoed many critics' arguments that the sanctioning bodies in charge of boxing championships had undermined the sport by pitting undeserving contenders against undeserving "champions", and forcing the boxing public to see mismatches for so-called "world championships". The Ring attempted to clear up the confusion regarding world champions by creating a championship policy that is "intended to reward fighters who, by satisfying rigid criteria, can justify a claim as the true and only world champion in a given weight class." The Ring claims to be more authoritative and open than the sanctioning bodies' rankings, with a page devoted to full explanations for ranking changes. A fighter pays no sanctioning fees to defend or fight for the title at stake, contrary to practices of the sanctioning bodies. Furthermore, a fighter cannot be stripped of the title unless he loses, decides to move to a different weight division, or retires.

There are currently only two ways that a boxer can win The Ring's title: defeat the reigning champion; or win a box-off between the magazine's number-one and number-two rated contenders (or, sometimes, number-one and number-three rated). A vacant Ring championship is filled when the number-one contender in a weight-division battles the number-two contender or the number-three contender (in cases where The Ring determines that the number-two and number-three contenders are close in abilities and records).

In May 2012, citing the number of vacancies in various weight classes as primary motivation, The Ring unveiled a new championship policy. Under the new policy, The Ring title can be awarded when the No. 1 and No. 2 fighters face one another or when the Nos. 1 and 2 contenders choose not to fight one another and either of them fights No. 3, No. 4 or No. 5, the winner may be awarded The Ring belt. In addition, there are now six ways for a fighter to lose his title: lose a fight in his championship weight class; move to another weight class; not schedule a fight in any weight class for 18 months; not schedule a fight in his championship weight class for 18 months, even if fighting at another weight class; not scheduling a fight with a top 5 contender in any weight class for two years; or retiring.

Many media outlets and members are extremely critical of the new championship policy and state that if this new policy is followed The Ring title will lose the credibility it once held.

==== Lineal ====
The Transnational Boxing Rankings Board (TBRB) hands out the official version of the lineal championship. TBRB awards vacant championships when the two top-ranked fighters in any division meet and currently recognizes legitimate world champions or "true champions" each weight classes. The Board was formed to continue where The Ring "left off" in the aftermath of its purchase by Golden Boy Promotions in 2007 and the following dismissal of Nigel Collins. After the new editors announced a controversial new championship policy in May 2012, three prominent members of the Ring Advisory Panel resigned. This three members (Springs Toledo, Cliff Rold and Tim Starks) became the founding members of the Transnational Boxing Rankings Board, which was formed over the summer of 2012 with the assistance of Stewart Howe of England.

Since 2012, lineal champions are predetermined by the Transnational Boxing Rankings Board, which promotes the concept of a singular world champion per weight class. Lineal champions are listed on Cyber Boxing Zone website which list lineal champions of the Queensberry Era to date.

== List of men's of sextuple champions ==
The following are the lists of boxers who have won six different titles in six unprecedentedly different categories of weight. In boxing, sextuple champions are just few boxers who has won world titles or belts in the incredible record of six different weight classes or divisions.

Inducted into the International Boxing Hall of Fame
World Titles from The Ring

No.	Name	Titles	Date	Opponent	Result
1	Oscar De La Hoya	**WBO** Super featherweight	Mar 5, 1994	Jimmy Bredahl	TKO 10/12
1	Oscar De La Hoya	**WBO** Lightweight	Feb 18, 1995	John-John Molina	UD 12/12
1	Oscar De La Hoya	**IBF** Lightweight	May 6, 1995	Rafael Ruelas	TKO 2/12
1	Oscar De La Hoya	**WBC** Light welterweight	Jun 7, 1996	Julio César Chávez	TKO 4/12
1	Oscar De La Hoya	**WBC** Welterweight	Apr 12, 1997	Pernell Whitaker	UD 12/12
1	Oscar De La Hoya	**WBC** Welterweight – (**2**)	Dec 21, 2000	**No. 1 contender promoted**	
1	Oscar De La Hoya	**WBC** Light middleweight	Jun 23, 2001	Javier Castillejo	UD 12/12
1	Oscar De La Hoya	**WBA** (Unified) Light middleweight	Sep 14, 2002	Fernando Vargas	TKO 11/12
1	Oscar De La Hoya	**The Ring** Light middleweight	Sep 14, 2002	Fernando Vargas	TKO 11/12
1	Oscar De La Hoya	**WBO** Middleweight	**Jun 5, 2004**	Felix Sturm	UD 12/12
1	Oscar De La Hoya	**WBC** Light middleweight – (**2**)	May 6, 2006	Ricardo Mayorga	TKO 6/12
2	Manny Pacquiao	**WBC** Flyweight	Dec 4, 1998	Chatchai Sasakul	KO 8/12
2	Manny Pacquiao	**IBF** Super bantamweight	Jun 23, 2001	Lehlohonolo Ledwaba	TKO 6/12
2	Manny Pacquiao	**The Ring** Featherweight	Nov 15, 2003	Marco Antonio Barrera	TKO 11/12
2	Manny Pacquiao	**WBC** Super featherweight	Mar 15, 2008	Juan Manuel Márquez	SD 12/12
2	Manny Pacquiao	**The Ring** Super featherweight	Mar 15, 2008	Juan Manuel Márquez	SD 12/12
2	Manny Pacquiao	**WBC** Lightweight	Jun 28, 2008	David Díaz	TKO 9/12
2	Manny Pacquiao	**The Ring** Light welterweight	**May 2, 2009**	Ricky Hatton	KO 2/12

=== Note ===
- Dates in bold format signify the date when they won their 6th division title.

== List of women's sextuple champion ==
The following is a list of women’s sextuple champions who have held titles from one or more of the "Big Four" organizations (WBA, WBC, IBF, WBO) and The Ring.

World Titles from The Ring

No.	Name	Titles	Date	Opponent	Result
1	Amanda Serrano	**IBF** Super featherweight	Sep 10, 2011	Kimberly Connor	TKO 2/10
1	Amanda Serrano	**WBO** Lightweight	Aug 15, 2014	Maria Elena Maderna	KO 6/10
1	Amanda Serrano	**WBO** Featherweight	Feb 17, 2016	Olivia Gerula	TKO 1/10
1	Amanda Serrano	**WBO** Super bantamweight	Oct 18, 2016	Alexandea Lazar	TKO 5/10
1	Amanda Serrano	**WBO** Bantamweight	Apr 22, 2017	Dahiana Santana	TKO 8/10
1	Amanda Serrano	**WBO** Light welterweight	**Sep 8, 2018**	Yamila Esther Reynoso	UD 10/10
1	Amanda Serrano	**WBO** Featherweight – (**2**)	Sep 13, 2019	Heather Hardy	UD 10/10
1	Amanda Serrano	**WBC** Featherweight	Feb 4, 2021	**Interim promoted**	
1	Amanda Serrano	**IBF** Featherweight	Sep 24, 2022	Sarah Mahfoud	UD 10/10
1	Amanda Serrano	**The Ring** Featherweight	Sep 24, 2022	Sarah Mahfoud	UD 10/10
1	Amanda Serrano	**WBA** Featherweight	Feb 4, 2023	Erika Cruz	UD 10/10

=== Note ===
- Dates in bold format signify the date when they won their 6th division title.

== See also ==
- List of current world boxing champions
- List of boxing triple champions
- List of boxing quadruple champions
- List of boxing quintuple champions
- List of boxing septuple champions
- Octuple champion
- List of WBA world champions
- List of WBC world champions
- List of IBF world champions
- List of WBO world champions
- List of The Ring world champions
