= Octuple champion =

Boxer with titles in 8 weight classes

An octuple champion is a boxer who has won major world titles in eight weight classes. To date, the only octuple champion is Manny Pacquiao, who has won twelve major world titles.

Pacquiao achieved the feat when he defeated Antonio Margarito via a unanimous decision to win the WBC super welterweight title on November 13, 2010 at the Cowboys Stadium, Arlington, Texas, US.

Nine of his world championships came from the "Big Four" sanctioning bodies (WBA, WBC, IBF, WBO) and three were from The Ring.

He also won the prestigious and coveted lineal championship in five weight divisions: flyweight, featherweight, super featherweight, light welterweight, and welterweight.

The following are the major world titles won by Pacquiao (arranged chronologically). Titles are listed only once per organization per weight class:

Inducted into the International Boxing Hall of Fame
World Titles from The Ring

Name	Titles	Date	Opponent	Result
Manny Pacquiao	WBC Flyweight	Dec 4, 1998	Chatchai Sasakul	KO 8/12
Manny Pacquiao	IBF Super bantamweight	Jun 23, 2001	Lehlohonolo Ledwaba	TKO 6/12
Manny Pacquiao	The Ring Featherweight	Nov 15, 2003	Marco Antonio Barrera	TKO 11/12
Manny Pacquiao	WBC Super featherweight	Mar 15, 2008	Juan Manuel Márquez	SD 12/12
Manny Pacquiao	The Ring Super featherweight	Mar 15, 2008	Juan Manuel Márquez	SD 12/12
Manny Pacquiao	WBC Lightweight	Jun 28, 2008	David Díaz	TKO 9/12
Manny Pacquiao	The Ring Light welterweight	May 2, 2009	Ricky Hatton	KO 2/12
Manny Pacquiao	WBO Welterweight	Nov 14, 2009	Miguel Ángel Cotto	TKO 12/12
Manny Pacquiao	WBC Light middleweight	Nov 13, 2010	Antonio Margarito	UD 12/12
Manny Pacquiao	WBO Welterweight – (2)	Apr 12, 2014	Timothy Bradley	UD 12/12
Manny Pacquiao	WBO Welterweight – (3)	Nov 5, 2016	Jessie Vargas	UD 12/12
Manny Pacquiao	WBA (Super) Welterweight	Jul 20, 2019	Keith Thurman	SD 12/12

== See also ==
- List of current world boxing champions
- List of boxing triple champions
- List of boxing quadruple champions
- List of boxing quintuple champions
- List of boxing sextuple champions
- List of boxing septuple champions
- List of WBA world champions
- List of WBC world champions
- List of IBF world champions
- List of WBO world champions
- List of The Ring world champions
