= 24/7 (American TV program) =

American reality television program

- Created by: HBO
- Narrated by: Liev Schreiber
- Composers: Amy Marie Beauchamp; Jose Cancela
- Country of origin: United States

Production
- Running time: 30 minutes

Original release
- Network: HBO
- Release: April 15, 2007 – 2019

24/7 is an American reality television program that follows sportsmen, and sporting organizations, for a period of weeks in the lead-up to a major sporting event. The program premiered with episodes featuring pairs of boxers as they prepare for their upcoming boxing match against one another. More recently it has expanded to other sport rivalries as well with NASCAR and the rivalry leading up to the 2011 NHL Winter Classic. Each edition of the program is generally split up into three to four episodes, and is narrated by Liev Schreiber.

In September 2019, the program was resumed airing under the title of 24/7 College Football, focused on four college football teams.

== Episodes ==
=== NHL ===
- Washington Capitals vs. Pittsburgh Penguins (2011)
- New York Rangers vs. Philadelphia Flyers (2012)
- Toronto Maple Leafs vs. Detroit Red Wings (2014)

=== Boxing ===
- Oscar De La Hoya vs. Floyd Mayweather Jr.
- Floyd Mayweather Jr. vs. Ricky Hatton
- Joe Calzaghe vs. Roy Jones Jr.
- Oscar De La Hoya vs. Manny Pacquiao
- Manny Pacquiao vs. Ricky Hatton
- Floyd Mayweather Jr. vs. Juan Manuel Márquez
- Manny Pacquiao vs. Miguel Cotto
- Floyd Mayweather Jr. vs. Shane Mosley
- Manny Pacquiao vs. Antonio Margarito
- Floyd Mayweather Jr. vs. Victor Ortiz
- Manny Pacquiao vs. Juan Manuel Márquez III
- Miguel Cotto vs. Antonio Margarito II
- Floyd Mayweather Jr. vs. Miguel Cotto
- Manny Pacquiao vs. Timothy Bradley
- Andre Ward vs. Chad Dawson
- Julio César Chávez Jr. vs. Sergio Martínez
- Manny Pacquiao vs. Juan Manuel Márquez IV
- Timothy Bradley vs. Juan Manuel Márquez
- Manny Pacquiao vs. Brandon Ríos
- Manny Pacquiao vs. Timothy Bradley II
- Sergio Martínez vs. Miguel Cotto
- Bernard Hopkins vs. Sergey Kovalev
- Manny Pacquiao vs. Chris Algieri
- Miguel Cotto vs. Canelo Álvarez
- Canelo Álvarez vs. Gennady Golovkin
- Canelo Álvarez vs. Gennady Golovkin II

=== NASCAR ===
- Jimmie Johnson: Race to Daytona
