= Amir Khan vs. Marcos Maidana =

Boxing match

Thunder & Lightning
- Date: 11 December 2010
- Venue: Mandalay Bay Resort & Casino, Paradise, Nevada, U.S.
- Title on the line: WBA light welterweight championship

Tale of the tape
Boxer	(United Kingdom) Amir Khan	(Argentina) Marcos Maidana
Nickname	"King"	"El Chino"
Hometown	Bolton, Greater Manchester, UK	Margarita, Santa Fe, Argentina
Purse	$1,500,000	$550,000
Pre-fight record	23–1 (17 KO)	29–1 (27 KO)
Age	24 years	31 years, 4 months
Height	5 ft 8 1/2 in (174 cm)	5 ft 7 in (170 cm)
Weight	140 lb (64 kg)	139 lb (63 kg)
Style	Orthodox	Orthodox
Recognition	WBA; Light Welterweight Champion; The Ring; No. 2 Ranked Light Welterweight	WBA "Interim"; Light Welterweight Champion; The Ring; No. 4 Ranked Light Welterweight

Result
- Khan defeats Maidana via unanimous decision

Amir Khan vs. Marcos Maidana was a professional boxing match contested on December 11, 2010, for the WBA Light welterweight championship. The bout was awarded Fight of the Year by the Boxing Writers Association of America.

== Background ==
On 9 March 2010, Golden Boy Promotions confirmed that WBA light welterweight champion Amir Khan and former light welterweight world champion Paulie Malignaggi will hold a press conference in London to announce their world title bout set for 15 May at the Madison Square Garden in New York. This was Khan's first bout in the U.S. The fight was for the WBA light welterweight title, which Khan won in the 11th round. Immediately after the fight, Khan stated he wanted to fight Marcos Maidana next and unify the light-welterweight division, suggesting that the way to do this would be for him to fight Maidana, and then go on to face the winner of a Devon Alexander vs. Timothy Bradley match.

Maidana, after failing to challenge undefeated WBO Junior Welterweight champion Timothy Bradley, postponed the fight to June 19 due to a back injury suffered by Maidana.

On May 3, Maidana pulled out of the fight yet again, still citing his back as the problem. The fight had already been rescheduled from June 19 to July 17, and Bradley went on to fight Luis Carlos Abregu on July 17, instead of Maidana.

After failing to secure the fight with Bradley, Maidana's camp announced that he would fight former-WBO junior welterweight champ DeMarcus Corley, on August 28, 2010 at the Luna Park Stadium in Buenos Aires, Argentina. Maidana went on to go and win by unanimous decision.

Khan was looking for a good opponent to next challenge him for his title. One of his possible opponents was Lightweight Champion Juan Manuel Marquez. Marquez decided not to move up in weight and stayed at lightweight.

Maidana then stated his intention to fight Khan: "Stop looking for possible opponents for next Khan December 11 in England. Stop looking for lightweight boxers and face the real 140-pounders. I'll go to Khan's home soil to take the other portion of the WBA title that belongs to me."

The HBO-televised fight took place at Mandalay Bay in Las Vegas.

=== Fight purses ===
Guaranteed fight purses:

- Amir Khan ($1,500,000) vs. Marcos Maidana ($550,000)
- Victor Ortiz ($150,000) vs. Lamont Peterson ($100,000)

== The fight ==
Khan successfully defended his title for the third time against mandatory challenger Marcos Maidana. Khan dominated the fight early and knocked down Maidana in the 1st round with multiple body shots. However, Maidana recovered and battered Khan with a furious barrage in the tenth, sending him wobbling toward the ropes. Khan was able to improve in Round 11 and Maidana had another good round in the 12th, as Maidana was able to secure the last 3 rounds of the fight, making it very competitive on the judges' scorecards. However, Khan was able to stay on his feet as the vicious punches by Maidana were not enough to secure a knockout. Khan won the fight by unanimous decision on the strength of his performance in the earlier rounds as well as a point deduction against Maidana for throwing an elbow in the fifth. C. J. Ross and Jerry Roth both scored the bout 114–111 while Glenn Trowbridge had it 113–112.

== Aftermath ==
=== Viewership and revenue ===
On HBO, the fight drew an audience of 1.17 million viewers in the United States. On Sky Box Office, the fight sold 164,000 pay-per-view buys in the United Kingdom. The fight had a combined HBO and Sky Box Office audience of 1.334 million viewers.

The fight grossed $500,000 at the live gate. On Sky Box Office, at a price of £14.95 ($23.95), pay-per-view revenue was £2,451,800 ($3,928,280). The fight had a combined US live-gate and UK pay-per-view revenue of $4,454,516.

=== Reception ===
The bout was awarded Fight of the Year by the Boxing Writers Association of America. It was called one of the 'fights of the decade' by Oscar De La Hoya.

In 2018, Joe Cortez, the fight's referee and veteran International Boxing Hall of Fame member, called the bout "one of the most outstanding, skillful and exciting" championship fights that he refereed throughout his career in the sport.

== Fight card ==
Confirmed bouts:

=== Televised ===
- Light Welterweight Championship bout: (United Kingdom) Amir Khan(c) vs. (Argentina) Marcos Maidana
  - Khan defeats Maidana via unanimous decision.
- Light Welterweight bout: (United States) Victor Ortiz vs. (United States) Lamont Peterson
  - Fight ended in a draw.

=== Untelevised ===
- Welterweight bout: (Dominican Republic) Joan Guzman vs. (United States) Jason Davis
  - Guzman defeats Davis via TKO at 0:29 of round 2.
- Heavyweightbout: (United States) Seth Mitchell vs. (United States) Taurus Sykes
  - Mitchell defeats Sykes via KO of round 5.
- Lightweight bout: (Uganda) Sharif Bogere vs. (United States) Christopher Fernandez
  - Bogere defeats Fernandez via unanimous decision.
- Light Welterweight bout: (United States) Jesse Vargas vs. (Mexico) Ramón Montaño
  - Vargas defeats Montaño via unanimous decision.
- Featherweight bout: (United States) Randy Caballero vs. (United States) Robert Guillen
  - Caballero defeats Guillen via unanimous decision.
- Middleweight bout: (Venezuela) Alfonso Blanco vs. (United States) Gustavo Medina
  - Blanco defeats Medina via TKO at 2:45 of round 3.
- Light Welterweight bout: (Republic of Ireland) Jamie Kavanagh vs. (United States) Jacob Thornton
  - Kavanagh defeats Thornton via TKO at 0:44 of round 1.

== International broadcasting ==
Country	Broadcaster
Canada	HBO Canada; TSN
Latin America	Space
Philippines	Solar Sports
United Kingdom	Sky Box Office
United States	HBO

Preceded by vs. Paulie Malignaggi	Amir Khan's bouts 11 December 2010	Succeeded by vs. Paul McCloskey
Preceded by vs. DeMarcus Corley	Marcos Maidana's bouts 11 December 2010	Succeeded by vs. Erik Morales
Awards
Preceded by Juan Manuel Márquez vs. Juan Díaz	Ali–Frazier Award; 2010	Succeeded by Pawel Wolak vs. Delvin Rodríguez
