= Manny Pacquiao vs. Timothy Bradley =

2012 boxing match

Perfect Storm
- Date: June 9, 2012
- Venue: MGM Grand Garden Arena, Paradise, Nevada, U.S.
- Title on the line: WBO welterweight title

Tale of the tape
Boxer	Manny Pacquiao	Timothy Bradley
Nickname	Pac-Man	Desert Storm
Hometown	General Santos, Soccsksargen, Philippines	Palm Springs, California, U.S.
Purse	$26,000,000	$5,000,000
Pre-fight record	54–3–2 (38 KO)	28–0 (12 KO)
Age	33 years, 5 months	28 years, 9 months
Height	5 ft 6 1/2 in (169 cm)	5 ft 6 in (168 cm)
Weight	147 lb (67 kg)	146 lb (66 kg)
Style	Southpaw	Orthodox
Recognition	WBO; Welterweight Champion; The Ring; No. 1 Ranked Welterweight; The Ring No. 2 ranked pound-for-pound fighter 8-division world champion	WBO; Junior Welterweight Champion; The Ring; No. 1 Ranked Light Welterweight; The Ring No. 8 ranked pound-for-pound fighter

Result
- Bradley wins via 12-round split decision (113–115, 115–113, 115–113)

Manny Pacquiao vs. Timothy Bradley, billed as Perfect Storm, was a professional boxing match contested on June 9, 2012, for the WBO welterweight world championship. It was held at the MGM Grand Garden Arena in Paradise, Nevada. After 12 rounds, Bradley won a highly controversial split decision to take the WBO welterweight world title.

== Background ==
Pacquiao came into the fight following a controversial November 2011 majority decision victory in Manny Pacquiao vs. Juan Manuel Marquez III. He brought with him world championships in eight different weight classes—a feat unmatched by anyone.

After fight negotiations between Pacquiao and Floyd Mayweather Jr., ended without coming to terms, Mayweather opted to challenge junior middleweight titlist Miguel Cotto on May 5. Cotto had also been in the running to face Pacquiao in a rematch, but Pacquiao and Cotto could not agree on the weight for the fight. Pacquiao wanted the 147-pound welterweight limit, which Cotto said was too low for him, and he accepted a fight with Mayweather. Also in the running to face Pacquiao were Lamont Peterson and Juan Manuel Marquez. Ultimately, it was Timothy Bradley who came to terms, agreeing to move up a weight class to challenge Pacquiao for his title.

Bradley came into the fight with a somewhat lower profile than a typical Pacquiao opponent. In January 2011, he won a 10th-round technical decision in a junior welterweight title unification bout against Devon Alexander. Previously, he had beaten then world-champion Lamont Peterson to claim the title. After the fight with Alexander, Bradley rejected an offer to fight Amir Khan and further unify the 140-pound division. He signed with Top Rank and was given a co-feature slot on the Pacquiao-Marquez III pay-per-view card in November. In his match, Bradley beat former lightweight champion Joel Casamayor in an eight-round fight.

Prior to the Pacquiao fight, Bradley was ranked as one of the top 10 pound for pound fighters in the world. In a show of confidence, Bradley had "rematch" posters printed up, implying he would win the fight.

== The fight ==
Pacquiao entered the fight as a substantial favorite, among both bookmakers and fans. Bradley entered the fight as a 7–2 underdog in the Vegas line. The glove weight was set at 8 ounces each. Midway through the first round, the crowd spontaneously began to chant "Manny, Manny, Manny ..."

Throughout the fight, action was fast-paced, with Pacquiao landing the harder punches. He appeared to take control early, beating Bradley on most exchanges. However, Bradley did make good use of the punches he was able to throw, connecting on some of them. Pacquiao won the first round, according to two of the three judges. Bradley was the more aggressive fighter in the second, backing Pacquiao against the ropes at one point. However, Pacquiao's patience paid off as he countered effectively at the end of the round. Two of the judges awarded the round to Bradley. According to trainer Joel Diaz, Bradley hurt his ankle during the round, but chose to press on. Pacquaio took control in the third round, winning on all three judges' cards. By the end of the round, Bradley "looked stunned".

During the fourth and fifth rounds, Bradley seemed to be visibly hurting. In the fourth round, Bradley was cautioned for a low blow, and forced on defense throughout. During the final seconds of the round, Bradley appeared close to going down multiple times. Pacquiao remained on the offensive during the fifth, but Bradley managed to land some counterpunches. All three judges gave the fourth round to Pacquiao, but only one awarded him the fifth.

Pacquiao dominated the sixth round, trapping Bradley in the corner, and getting off several consecutive unanswered punches. All judges gave Pacquiao the sixth round.

Things started to turn in Bradley's favor during the second half of the fight, as Pacquiao struggled to land big punches. Around the seventh round, Bradley began to use his double jab effectively, and avoid Pacquiao's counterpunches. He moved better, and got off his own counterpunches. "I got my second wind in the sixth round," Bradley said after the fight. Bradley won the seventh round, according to all three judges, with Pacquiao being backed into the ropes near the end of the round.

The eighth round saw a brief stoppage after Bradley appeared to get caught in the eye by Pacquiao's thumb. After the stoppage, Bradley appeared to be in trouble, but reduced his arm swing, to avoid further counterattacks by Pacquiao. Two judges scored the round in favor of Bradley. In the ninth round, Pacquiao was able to take advantage of Bradley's aggression, and drive him back into the ropes. Bradley left himself too open to counterpunches, and Pacquiao won the round on two of the three judges' cards. Bradley bounced back in the tenth round, winning on all cards, thanks in part to a good head shot midway through the round.

During the eleventh round, Bradley appeared to be gaining momentum, landing a series of punches, and backing Pacquiao against the ropes. The crowd began to chant Bradley's name. Pacquiao silenced the crowd with a series of punches of his own, but two judges gave the round to Bradley. In the final round, both fighters pushed the action. Bradley landed a strong shot to Pacquiao's jaw in the final minute, and the match ended with a series of wild punches by both parties. Bradley won the final round on all three scorecards.

In the end, Bradley won a highly controversial split decision over Pacquiao. Judges Duane Ford and C. J. Ross scored the fight 115–113 in favor of Bradley, while Jerry Roth scored the fight 115–113 in favor of Pacquiao. It was Pacquiao's first defeat in seven years. For his win, Bradley received a US$5 million check—the largest prize of his career.

== Aftermath ==
Following the announcement of the decision, the crowd booed loudly. Pacquiao appeared to be stunned by the result. Fight promoter Bob Arum was irate, and said that he was worried about boxing's credibility in the aftermath of the decision. He also questioned the competence of the judges. Arum also stated that before the scorecards were read out, Bradley told him "I tried hard but I couldn't beat the guy." A few reporters questioned Bob Arum's sincerity in his comments and hinted that he was in on the bad decisions. One reporter, Tito Garcia of FanvsFan.com, interrupted Arum's press conference by loudly accusing Arum of fixing the fight. Garcia was physically ejected from the press conference.

Pacquiao said he was shocked by the result, but accepted the decision respectfully, saying "I did my best. I guess my best wasn't good enough," adding, "He never hurt me with his punches, most of them landed on my arms." Immediately after the fight, Bradley stated, "Every round was pretty close. I got to go home and view the tape and see if I really won." He later remarked, "I thought I won the fight. I didn't think he was as good as everyone says he was. I didn't feel his power."

The decision was criticized by many commentators. The Associated Press and the Los Angeles Times scored the fight 117–111 in favor of Pacquiao, while ESPN and Harold Lederman of HBO both scored the fight 119–109, also in Pacquiao's favor. ESPN boxing analyst and longtime trainer Teddy Atlas said that Pacquiao clearly won, and that it was a case of either incompetence or corruption. He added that boxing needs a national commission, so that judges can be accountable for their decisions. According to the AP's count, Pacquiao landed 253 punches to Bradley's 159. Former champion Oscar De La Hoya said that Bradley should have refused the title belt, and Pacquiao had won the fight.

However, not everyone was upset by the result. Corbin Middlemas of the Australian Broadcasting Corporation said the fight was very close and difficult to score. "For all of the sports vices, this [decision] wasn't one of them," he said. The only poor decision would have been to award either fighter victory by a large margin, he added.

Following the event, Bradley announced that he would welcome a rematch, which was also held at the MGM Grand Garden Arena on April 12, 2014. Pacquiao defeated Bradley via unanimous decision and regained the WBO title. Manny Pacquiao vs. Timothy Bradley III then took place almost two years later on April 9, 2016. Pacquiao again defeated Bradley via unanimous decision and knocked him down twice along the way.

== Scorecards ==
=== Main event official scorecard ===
Nevada State Athletic Commission Official score card
Title: WBO Welterweight					Referee: Robert Byrd					Supervisor: István Kovács				
Date: June 9, 2012					Venue: MGM Grand Garden Arena, Las Vegas					Promoter: Top Rank				
Pacquiao		vs.	Bradley		Pacquiao		vs.	Bradley		Pacquiao		vs.	Bradley	
RS	TS	Rd	TS	RS	RS	TS	Rd	TS	RS	RS	TS	Rd	TS	RS
10		1		9	10		1		9	9		1		10
9	19	2	19	10	9	19	2	19	10	10	19	2	19	9
10	29	3	28	9	10	29	3	28	9	10	29	3	28	9
10	39	4	37	9	10	39	4	37	9	10	39	4	37	9
10	49	5	46	9	9	48	5	47	10	9	48	5	47	10
10	59	6	55	9	10	58	6	56	9	10	58	6	56	9
9	68	7	65	10	9	67	7	66	10	9	67	7	66	10
10	78	8	74	9	9	76	8	76	10	9	76	8	76	10
10	88	9	83	9	10	86	9	85	9	9	85	9	86	10
9	97	10	93	10	9	95	10	95	10	9	94	10	96	10
9	106	11	103	10	9	104	11	105	10	10	104	11	105	9
9	115	12	113	10	9	113	12	115	10	9	113	12	115	10
FINAL SCORE	115	–	113	FINAL SCORE	FINAL SCORE	113	–	115	FINAL SCORE	FINAL SCORE	113	–	115	FINAL SCORE
Won			Lost		Lost			Won		Lost			Won	
Judge: Jerry Roth					Judge: C. J. Ross					Judge: Duane Ford				
Suspensions: none					Point deductions: none					Decision: Bradley won via split decision				

=== Main event unofficial scorecards ===
	Writer	Agency	Scorecard	Winner
1	Harold Lederman	HBO	119–109	Pacquiao
2	Ray Markarian	The Sweet Science	119–109	Pacquiao
3	Michael Marley	Examiner	119–109	Pacquiao
4	Dan Rafael	ESPN	119–109	Pacquiao
5	Vittorio Tafur	San Francisco Chronicle	119–109	Pacquiao
6	Michael Woods	The Sweet Science	119–109	Pacquiao
7	Barry Tompkins	Showtime	119–110	Pacquiao
8	Ramon Aranda	3 More Rounds	118–110	Pacquiao
9	Mario Cabrera	Boxing Republic	118–110	Pacquiao
10	Nigel Collins	ESPN	118–110	Pacquiao
11	Mike Coppinger	Ring Magazine	118–110	Pacquiao
12	Ace Freeman	Fight Fan	118–110	Pacquiao
13	Rich Marotta	KFI Los Angeles	118–110	Pacquiao
14	Kelsey McCarson	The Sweet Science	118–110	Pacquiao
15	Gabriel Montoya	MaxBoxing	118–110	Pacquiao
16	Pete O'Brien	USA Today	118–110	Pacquiao
17	Eric Raskin	Grantland	118–110	Pacquiao
18	Michael Rosenthal	Ring Magazine	118–110	Pacquiao
19	Colin Seymour	Examiner	118–110	Pacquiao
20	Ryan Songalia	Ring Magazine	118–110	Pacquiao
21	Gary Andrew Poole	TIME	118–110	Pacquiao
22	Nick Xouris	Fight Hype	118–111	Pacquiao
23	Ryan Burton	Boxing Scene	117–111	Pacquiao
24	Scott Christ	Bad Left Hook	117–111	Pacquiao
25	Tim Dahlberg	Associated Press	117–111	Pacquiao
26	Quinito Henson	The Philippine Star	117–111	Pacquiao
27	Eduardo Lamazon	TV Azteca	117–111	Pacquiao
28	Gareth Davies	London Daily Telegraph	117–111	Pacquiao
29	Doug Fischer	Ring Magazine	117–111	Pacquiao
30	David Greisman	Boxing Scene	117–111	Pacquiao
31	Jorge Hernandez	The Low Blow	117–111	Pacquiao
32	Kevin Iole	Yahoo! Sports	117–111	Pacquiao
33	Robert Littal	Black Sports Online	117–111	Pacquiao
34	Steve Kim	Max Boxing	117–111	Pacquiao
35	Ryan Maquiñana	Comcast SportsNet Bay Area	117–111	Pacquiao
36	David Mayo	MLive	117–111	Pacquiao
37	Kieran Mulvaney	HBO	117–111	Pacquiao
38	Lance Pugmire	Los Angeles Times	117–111	Pacquiao
39	Chris Robinson	Boxing Scene	117–111	Pacquiao
40	Champ Ross	Da Truth Boxing	117–111	Pacquiao
41	Luis Sandoval	Boxing Scene	117–111	Pacquiao
42	Jonathan Sakti	Comcast SportsNet Bay Area	117–111	Pacquiao
43	Tim Starks	Queensberry Rules	117–111	Pacquiao
44	Richie Tomassini	Comcast SportsNet Bay Area	117–111	Pacquiao
45	Darren Velasco	8 Count News	117–111	Pacquiao
46	Cliff Rold	Boxing Scene	117–111	Pacquiao
47	Springs Toledo	The Sweet Science	117–112	Pacquiao
48	Rick Reeno	Boxing Scene	116–112	Pacquiao
49	George Willis	New York Post	116–112	Pacquiao
50	Steve Zemach	Queensberry Rules	116–112	Pacquiao
51	Armando Alvarez	Telemundo	115–113	Pacquiao
52	Jake Donovan	Boxing Scene	115–113	Pacquiao
53	Lem Satterfield	Ring Magazine	115–113	Pacquiao
54	J.C. Casarez	Boxeo Mundial	115–113	Pacquiao
55	Thomas Hauser	HBO	115–114	Bradley
56	Bart Barry	HBO	116–115	Bradley
57	Brian Kenny	Top Rank	116–112	Bradley

Total, 57: Pacquiao 54 | Bradley 3.

=== WBO review ===
After the decision the WBO ordered a video review of the bout. The five judges on the WBO's committee all scored the fight in Pacquiao's favor — 118–110, 117–111, 117–111, 116–112 and 115–113. However, the WBO cannot overturn the result of the fight.

== Fight card ==
Confirmed bouts:

- Welterweight Championship bout: (Philippines) Manny Pacquiao (c) vs. (United States) Timothy Bradley
  - Bradley won via split decision
- Welterweight Championship bout: (United States) Mike Jones vs. (United States) Randall Bailey
  - Bailey won via 11th-round knockout
- Bantamweight Championship bout: (Mexico) Jorge Arce (c) vs. (Puerto Rico) Jesús Rojas
  - Fight ended in a no contest
- Super Bantamweight Championship bout: (Cuba) Guillermo Rigondeaux (c) vs. (United States) Teon Kennedy
  - Rigondeaux won via 5th-round technical knockout

=== Preliminary card ===
- Welterweight bout: (Canada) Mikael Zewski vs. (United States) Ryan Grimaldo
  - Zewski won via 3rd-round knockout
- Welterweight bout: (United States) Andrew Ruiz vs. (United States) Tyler Larson
  - Ruiz won via unanimous decision
- Super Middleweight bout: (United States) Jesse Hart vs. (United States) Manuel Eastman
  - Hart won via 1st-round technical knockout
- Junior Lightweight bout: (Philippines) Ernie Sanchez vs. (Dominican Republic) Wilton Hilario
  - Sanchez won via unanimous decision

== International broadcasting ==
Country / Region	Broadcaster
Brazil	SporTV
Canada	Canal Indigo
Romania	The Money Channel
United States	HBO PPV
(United Kingdom) UK	Primetime
Republic of Ireland	Primetime
Indonesia	RCTI
Philippines	GMA Network, Solar Sports, Solar All Access, IBC 13 (delayed)
Thailand	Channel 7
Denmark	TV 2 Sport

The fight drew 890,000 pay-per-view purchases.

Preceded by vs. Juan Manuel Márquez III	Manny Pacquiao's bouts 6 June 2012	Succeeded by vs. Juan Manuel Márquez IV
Preceded by vs. Joel Casamayor	Timothy Bradley's bouts 6 June 2012	Succeeded by vs. Ruslan Provodnikov
