= Timothy Bradley vs. Devon Alexander =

Boxing competition

The Super Fight
- Date: January 29, 2011
- Venue: Silverdome, Pontiac, Michigan
- Title(s) on the line: WBC and WBO light welterweight titles

Tale of the tape
Boxer	(United States) Timothy Bradley	(United States) Devon Alexander
Nickname	"Desert Storm"	"Alexander the Great"
Hometown	Palm Springs, California	St. Louis, Missouri
Pre-fight record	26–0 (11 KO)	21–0 (13 KO)
Age	27 years, 5 months	23 years, 11 months
Height	5 ft 6 in (168 cm)	5 ft 8 in (173 cm)
Weight	139 1/2 lb (63 kg)	140 lb (64 kg)
Style	Orthodox	Orthodox
Recognition	WBO; Light Welterweight Champion; The Ring No. 9 ranked pound-for-pound fighter The Ring; No. 1 Ranked Light Welterweight	WBC; Light Welterweight Champion; The Ring; No. 3 Ranked Light Welterweight

Result
- Bradley defeats Alexander by technical decision.

Timothy Bradley vs. Devon Alexander was a professional boxing match contested on January 29, 2011, for the WBC and WBO light welterweight championship.

== Background ==
The winner of the fight was slated to fight against World Boxing Association champion Amir Khan after his unanimous decision win against Marcos Maidana.

== The fight ==
Bradley won a technical decision against Alexander in 10 rounds. Alexander suffered a cut above his right eye in the third round after an accidental butt. The bout was stopped about a minute into the tenth round after another accidental head clash, which left Alexander unable to continue.

== Aftermath ==
Timothy Bradley would be stripped of the WBC title as he refused to fight Amir Khan. It had speculated that Bradley was not satisfied with the $1.3 million to fight a boxer of Amir Khan's caliber, although this was Bradley highest pay day in his entire career so far. He had admitted that it was too risky to fight Amir Khan, asking rhetorically on the American radio show Leave It In The Ring, "What if I lose then I am out the sweepstake to fight pound-for-pound-king Manny Pacquiao for 7.5 million dollars?" Bradley's refusal to take the fight led to a falling out between him and his promoter Gary Shaw. Subsequently, he was stripped of the WBC title due to inactivity.

== Undercard ==
Confirmed bouts:

=== Televised ===
- Junior welterweight unified championship bout: (United States) Timothy Bradley(c) vs. (United States) Devon Alexander(c)
  - Bradley defeats Alexander by technical decision in round 10.
- Heavyweight bout: (Canada) Bermane Stiverne vs. (Trinidad and Tobago) Kertson Manswell
  - Stiverne defeats Manswell via TKO at 1:52 of round 2.
- Welterweight bout: (Mexico) James de la Rosa vs. (United States) Allen Conyers
  - Conyers defeats de la Rosa by unanimous decision.
- Light welterweight bout: (United States) Emanuel Augustus vs. (United States) Vernon Paris
  - Paris defeats Augustus by points.

=== Untelevised ===
- Light welterweight bout: (Mexico) Julio Diaz vs. (Mexico) Pavel Miranda
  - Diaz defeats Miranda via TKO at 2:17 of round 8.
- Welterweight bout: (United States) Kendall Holt vs. (Costa Rica) Lenin Arroyo
  - Holt defeats Arroyo via TKO at 1:50 of round 1.
- Super middleweight bout: (United States) Darryl Cunningham vs. (Dominican Republic) Alberto Mercedes
  - Cunningham defeats Mercedes by unanimous decision.
- Light heavyweight bout: (United States) Marcus Oliveira vs. (United States) Demetrius Jenkins
  - Oliveira defeats Jenkins by unanimous decision.
- Light middleweight bout: (United States) Julian Williams vs. (United States) Torrence King
  - Williams defeats King via TKO at 0:28 of round 1.

== Broadcasting ==
Country	Broadcaster
Hungary	Sport 1
United States	HBO

Preceded by vs. Luis Abregú	Timothy Bradley's bouts 29 January 2011	Succeeded by vs. Joel Casamayor
Preceded by vs. Andreas Kotelnik	Devon Alexander's bouts 29 January 2011	Succeeded by vs. Lucas Matthysse
