= Steven Navarro =

American boxer (born 2004)

Personal information
- Born: Isaias Esteven Navarro; 19 March 2004 (age 22) Los Angeles, California, U.S
- Height: 5 ft 6 in (1.68 m)
- Weight: Super flyweight

Boxing career
- Stance: Orthodox

Boxing record
- Total fights: 5
- Wins: 5
- Win by KO: 4
- Losses: 0

Steven Navarro (born 19 March 2004) is an American professional boxer. He currently competes in the super flyweight division.

== Amateur career ==
Navarro started boxing when he was 9 years old. He had a stellar amateur career becoming a 13 time national champion. He comes from a boxing family. His dad Refugio Navarro had 10 professional fights, his uncle Jose Navarro fought at 2000 Olympic Games and challenged for a world title four times. His other uncle Carlos Navarro was a pro for 11 years and finished with a record of 27–6–1.

== Professional career ==
Soon after winning his pro debut Navarro signed with Bob Arums Top Rank Promotions. After his first year as a pro he was named by boxing publisher TSS(The Sweet Science) as their 2024 Prospect of the Year After winning just his fifth professional fight former two weight world champion Timothy Bradley was comparing him to Jesse Rodriguez who was ranked sixth in the P4P rankings at the time.

== Professional boxing record ==
| 5 fights | 5 wins | 0 losses |
|---|---|---|
| By knockout | 4 | 0 |
| By decision | 1 | 0 |

| No. | Result | Record | Opponent | Type | Round, time | Date | Location | Notes |
|---|---|---|---|---|---|---|---|---|
| 5 | Win | 5–0 | (Puerto Rico) Gabriel Bernardi Cruz | TKO | 2 (6), 2:29 | 7 Dec 2024 | (United States) Footprint Center, Phoenix, Arizona, U.S. | |
| 4 | Win | 4–0 | (Nicaragua) Oscar Arroyo | TKO | 3 (6), 2:35 | 20 Sep 2024 | (United States) Desert Diamond Arena, Glendale, Arizona, U.S. | |
| 3 | Win | 3–0 | (Mexico) Israel Camacho | TKO | 1 (6), 2:14 | 10 Aug 2024 | (United States) Tingley Colisseum, Albuquerque, New Mexico, U.S. | |
| 2 | Win | 2–0 | (Chile) Juan Pablo Meza | UD | 6 | 21 Jun 2024 | (United States) Fontainebleau Las Vegas, Las Vegas, Nevada, U.S. | |
| 1 | Win | 1–0 | (Mexico) Jose Lopez | TKO | 6 (6), 2:42 | 6 Apr 2024 | (United States) Fontainebleau Las Vegas, Las Vegas, Nevada, U.S. | |
