= Irving García =

Irving García or Garcia may refer to:

- Irving Garcia (boxer) (born 1979), Puerto Rican former boxer
- Irving Garcia (soccer, born 1988), American soccer player
- Irving García (footballer, born 1991), Mexican footballer
