= Chris Algieri =

American boxer (born 1984)

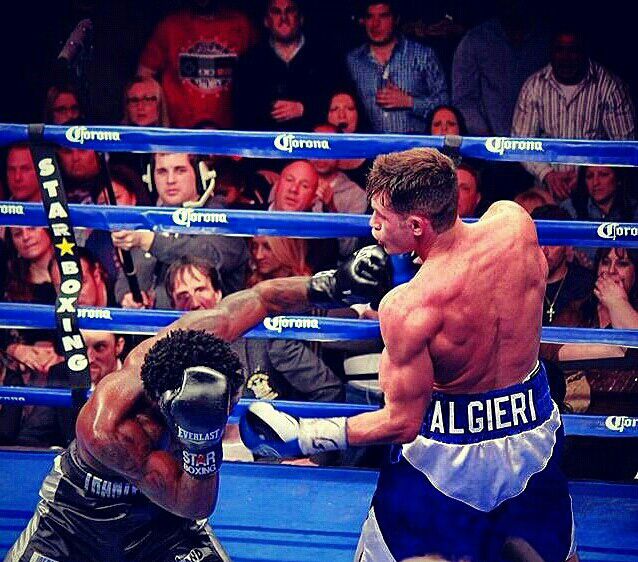
- Algieri (right) vs. Emmanuel Taylor, 2014

Personal information
- Nickname: The Fighting Collegian
- Born: Christopher Mark Algieri; March 2, 1984 (age 42) Huntington, New York, U.S.
- Height: 5 ft 10 in (178 cm)
- Weight: Light welterweight; Welterweight

Boxing career
- Reach: 72 in (183 cm)
- Stance: Orthodox

Boxing record
- Total fights: 29
- Wins: 25
- Win by KO: 9
- Losses: 4

Christopher Mark Algieri (born March 2, 1984) is an American professional boxer and former kickboxer. In boxing he held the WBO junior welterweight title in 2014 and challenged for the WBO welterweight title later that year; in kickboxing he was an undefeated ISKA World welterweight and WKA World super welterweight champion. Outside of boxing, Algieri works as a nutritionist.

== Early and personal life ==
Algieri was born into a working-class family in Huntington, New York, to an Italian father and an Argentine mother. He has a bachelor's degree in healthcare science from Stony Brook University and a master's degree in clinical nutrition from the New York Institute of Technology. Algieri has expressed his desire to go to medical school and combine his experience as a world-class athlete and his knowledge of nutrition to spearhead a practice designed to treat competitive athletes without the use of unnecessary surgeries, pharmaceuticals or long lay-offs.

== Kickboxing career ==
As an amateur, Algieri won the USKBA Northeast Championship defeating Kyle Murray. Algieri later turned professional, and won the International Sport Karate Association Welterweight and World Kickboxing Association Super Welterweight Championships. He also competed in the World Combat League before retiring to become a professional boxer.

== Nutritionist ==
Algieri was the Performance Nutrition Consultant to Division I Stony Brook University Seawolves from 2016 to 2018.

Algieri formerly served as team nutritionist to American middleweight Daniel Jacobs.

== Professional boxing career ==
=== Early career ===
Algieri turned pro in 2008, and put together a record of 18–0 with 8 knockouts. In most fights, he moved between light welterweight and welterweight. On February 14, 2014, Algieri won a unanimous ten-round decision over Emmanuel Taylor, an IBF number four ranked contender, at the Paramount Theatre in Huntington, Long Island, New York, to enter the world rankings.

Algieri had accumulated wins over the likes of top prospect Jose Alejo, a bout featured on NBC Sports Network and former United States Boxing Association (USBA) Champion Mike Arnaoutis prior to the Taylor fight, and he reached 10–0 when Joe DeGuardia's Star Boxing signed him.

=== Light welterweight ===
==== Algieri vs. Provodnikov ====
On June 14, 2014, Algieri got the chance of a lifetime as he faced and defeated the newly crowned WBO junior welterweight champion Ruslan Provodnikov, headlining on HBO's "Boxing After Dark" card at the Barclays Center in Brooklyn, New York. Algieri was seen as a warm-up fight for Provodnikov, which seemed to be the case as early on Algieri was dropped and hurt twice, with his eye swelling grotesquely, essentially blinding him for the rest of the fight, it all seemed to be over. However, Algieri fought back and began to box for the remainder of the fight, using his strong jab to keep his opponent back and moved on the outside, avoiding his Russian counterparts big looping shots. The bout went the full 12 rounds and Algieri won via split decision to become the new WBO junior welterweight champion. Algieri received his biggest purse at the time, $100,000 for the bout. Algieri landing 288 of 993 punches (29%), 177 of 427 (41%) power shots. Provodnikov landed 205 of his 776 punches thrown (26%), which included 164 of 434 power shots (38%). Many media outlets either had Provodnikov winning wide or Algieri winning a close decision. The fight generated high ratings for Algieri's HBO debut, averaging 1.046 million viewers, and peaking at 1.1 million viewers.

=== Welterweight ===
==== Algieri vs. Pacquiao ====
After proving himself in the Provodnikov fight, Algieri was given a big shot as he fought legendary boxer Manny Pacquiao on November 23, 2014, in Macau, for the latter's WBO Welterweight title, it was Algieri's first fight outside the State of New York. Algieri was stripped of his belt at 140 as WBO rules mandate a fighter of theirs can only hold belts in one division at a time. Algieri was a big underdog coming in, and in a one-sided bout, Pacquiao knocked Algieri down six times and made him tumble repeatedly en route to defeating him via one-sided unanimous decision, ending Algieri's undefeated streak.

==== Algieri vs. Khan ====
On April 3, 2015, Amir Khan announced via his wife's YouTube channel that he had agreed to a May 30 welterweight bout with Algieri in New York. The fight was later finalized on April 15, and subsequently set for May 29 at the Barclays Center in Brooklyn, New York. Algieri coming off the Pacquiao loss was seen as an easy touch for Khan by many. But with his new trainer John David Jackson, Algieri hatched a fight plan to be aggressive and apply pressure in the bout, when he usually fights on the outside with a strong jab. He entered the bout weighing more than Khan, and in the fight many commented on how much Algieri had improved since the Pacquiao fight, and that he looked the stronger and fitter of the two. Algieri instantly began cutting down the ring and had Khan backing up fast and unable to land his quick combinations. Algieri, who is not really known as a puncher was able to rock Khan with a big shot early on, and Algieri chased Khan the whole night, landing big punches in every round and finished the night strongly. Khan went on to win the fight via unanimous decision after 12 rounds of boxing, many believing him to win widely on the cards as he was able to steal many of the rounds in the last 10 seconds. Algieri however, believed that he had, in fact, won the bout. Khan made $1.5 million and Algieri earned a $500,000 purse. The fight, which took place on Spike, averaged 1 million viewers and peaked at 1.2 million.

==== Algieri vs. Bone ====
On December 5, 2015, Algieri knocked down Ecuadorian Erick Bone (16–2, 8 KOs) in the 8th round to win via unanimous decision. Bone was coming off a 5th-round knockout loss to Shawn Porter.

==== Algieri vs. Spence Jr. ====
On February 23, 2016, it was announced that Algieri would take on one of welterweights hottest prospects Errol Spence Jr. (19–0, 16 KOs) on April 16 at the Barclays Center where he was (2–2) against opponents. This fight was important to both Algieri, who had to redeem himself in the division after losing to Khan and Pacquiao, and important to Spence as he wanted to make a statement in the division as a rising star against a former titleholder. Spence dominated the bout with jabs in center ring and won every round. Algieri moved well and tried to both land jabs and counter. Algieri went down once in the fourth round and twice in the fifth round. Spence finished him on the ropes. The time of stoppage was 0:48 of round 5. It was the first time Algieri had been stopped inside the distance. Algieri received a purse of $325,000 with which he was unhappy. Spence earned $225,000.

==== Algieri vs. Hernandez ====
In October 2018, after around two-and-a-half years out of the ring, primarily working as a nutritionist for several boxers, Algieri announced he would be returning to The Paramount in Huntington, New York on November 30, 2018. Algieri was a poster boy for The Paramount Theatre, having eight consecutive fights there between 2011 and 2014. Algieri re-signed with former long-time promoter Joe DeGuardia and Star Boxing. It was announced he would fight journeyman Angel Hernandez (14–11–2, 9 KOs), although a catchweight was not confirmed. In front of a sold-out crowd, Algieri defeated Hernandez after 10 rounds via unanimous decision. Using high work rate, Algieri took control from the opening bell. Fighting under Andre Rozier for the first time, Algieri displayed tremendous hand speed. For his part, Hernandez tried to move forward but was unable to keep up with Algieri's boxing skills. After 10 rounds, the fight was scored 100–90, 100–90, and 99–91 for Algieri.

=== Return at light welterweight ===
==== Algieri vs. Gonzalez ====
In early December 2018, it was reported that Matchroom promoter Eddie Hearn was looking to match WBO light welterweight champion Maurice Hooker (25–0–1, 19 KOs) with more credible opponents in 2019. Hearn planned for Algieri and Jorge Linares to fight in separate bouts on his January 18, 2019 DAZN card. Later that month, Boxing Scene announced Algieri would fight in a 10-round bout against 28-year-old Danny Gonzalez (17–1–1, 7 KOs), who was on a 3-fight win streak since suffering his sole loss. Gonzalez and Algieri were former sparring partners. The card would take place at the Hulu Theater in New York City. In what was considered a close bout, Algieri defeated Gonzalez via unanimous decision after 10 rounds. The three judges scored the bout 98–92, 97–93, and 96–94 in favour of Algieri. The decision came with boos from the crowd, who felt the scores did not reflect the fight. Algieri started the fight with his jab, keeping Gonzalez at a distance, this was until Gonzalez got through and managed to cause a cut under Algieri's left eye. Seeing this as motivation, Gonzalez tried to pile on pressure, but was only able to land no more than two shots at a time. In round 10, Gonzalez managed to trap Algieri but did not land any clean shots until Algieri was able to break free. Speaking to DAZN, after the bout, Algieri said, "I am my biggest critic and this performance wasn’t my best. I got the win and I am moving on [...] I felt a little off today. You go back to the drawing board and look to come back better.”

==== Algieri vs. Coyle ====
On May 3, 2019, it was announced that Algieri would fight British boxer Tommy Coyle (25–4, 12 KOs) on the Anthony Joshua vs. Andy Ruiz Jr on June 1, at Madison Square Garden in New York on DAZN. Algieri believed a win over Coyle, would bring him closer to another world title opportunity. He said, “I'd like to thank my entire team for making this possible and for their total support of my quest to once again become a world champion.” Algieri reiterated his desire to challenge for the WBO title against Hooker, claiming he did not lose the belt in the ring.

== Professional boxing record ==
29 fights	25 wins	4 losses
By knockout	9	2
By decision	16	2

No.	Result	Record	Opponent	Type	Round, time	Date	Location	Notes
29	Loss	25–4	Conor Benn	KO	4 (12), 2:58	Dec 11, 2021	M&S Bank Arena, Liverpool, England	
28	Win	25–3	Mikkel LesPierre	UD	10	Aug 3, 2021	The Theater at Madison Square Garden, New York City, New York, U.S.	
27	Win	24–3	Tommy Coyle	RTD	8 (12), 3:00	Jun 1, 2019	Madison Square Garden, New York City, New York, U.S.	Retained WBO International junior welterweight title
26	Win	23–3	Danny Gonzalez	UD	10	Jan 18, 2019	Hulu Theater, New York City, New York, U.S.	Won vacant WBO International junior welterweight title
25	Win	22–3	Angel Hernandez	UD	10	Nov 30, 2018	The Paramount, Huntington, New York, U.S.	
24	Loss	21–3	Errol Spence Jr.	TKO	5 (10), 0:48	Apr 16, 2016	Barclays Center, New York City, New York, U.S.	
23	Win	21–2	Erick Bone	UD	10	Dec 5, 2015	Barclays Center, New York City, New York, U.S.	
22	Loss	20–2	Amir Khan	UD	12	May 29, 2015	Barclays Center, New York City, New York, U.S.	For WBC Silver welterweight title
21	Loss	20–1	Manny Pacquiao	UD	12	Nov 23, 2014	Cotai Arena, Macau, SAR	For WBO welterweight title
20	Win	20–0	Ruslan Provodnikov	SD	12	Jun 14, 2014	Barclays Center, New York City, New York, U.S.	Won WBO junior welterweight title
19	Win	19–0	Emanuel Taylor	UD	10	Feb 14, 2014	The Paramount, Huntington, New York, U.S.	
18	Win	18–0	Wilfredo Acuna	RTD	7 (8), 3:00	Sep 14, 2013	The Paramount, Huntington, New York, U.S.	
17	Win	17–0	Mike Arnaoutis	UD	10	Jul 20, 2013	The Paramount, Huntington, New York, U.S.	
16	Win	16–0	Jose Peralta Alejo	UD	10	Feb 23, 2013	The Paramount, Huntington, New York, U.S.	
15	Win	15–0	Raul Tovar	UD	8	Jul 28, 2012	The Paramount, Huntington, New York, U.S.	
14	Win	14–0	Winston Mathis	TKO	3 (8), 0:53	Mar 31, 2012	The Paramount, Huntington, New York, U.S.	
13	Win	13–0	Curtis Smith	UD	8	Jan 28, 2012	The Paramount, Huntington, New York, U.S.	
12	Win	12–0	Bayan Jargal	UD	10	Nov 19, 2011	The Paramount, Huntington, New York, U.S.	
11	Win	11–0	Julias Edmonds	TKO	4 (8), 2:24	Mar 17, 2011	Plattduetsche Restaurant, Hempstead, New York, U.S.	
10	Win	10–0	James Hope	UD	6	Jan 23, 2010	The Theater at Madison Square Garden, New York City, New York, U.S.	
9	Win	9–0	Edward Valdez	RTD	3 (6), 3:00	Sep 18, 2009	PAL Gym, New York City, New York, U.S.	
8	Win	8–0	Jose L Guzman	UD	6	Jul 18, 2009	Plattduetsche Restaurant, Hempstead, New York, U.S.	
7	Win	7–0	Henry White Jr.	UD	6	Jun 5, 2009	Theatre at Westbury, North Hempstead, New York, U.S.	
6	Win	6–0	Eric Rodriguez	TKO	3 (6)	May 8, 2009	Plattduetsche Park Restaurant, Hempstead, New York, U.S.	
5	Win	5–0	Jason Jordan	UD	4	Nov 25, 2008	Hilton Hotel, Huntington, New York, U.S.	
4	Win	4–0	Clarence Smith	TKO	1 (4), 2:07	Sep 26, 2008	Hilton Hotel, Huntington, New York, U.S.	
3	Win	3–0	Rakeem Carter	TKO	4 (4), 1:50	Aug 1, 2008	Aviator Sports & Events Center, New York City, New York, U.S.	
2	Win	2–0	Jeradiael Figueroa	UD	4	May 17, 2008	Aviator Sports & Events Center, New York City, New York, U.S.	
1	Win	1–0	Ken Dunham	TKO	3 (4), 1:54	Apr 3, 2008	Aviator Sports & Events Center, New York City, New York, U.S.	

== Pay-per-view bouts ==
United States
Date	Fight	Billing	Buys	Network	Revenue
November 23, 2014	Pacquiao vs. Algieri	Hungry for Glory	400,000	HBO	$24,000,000

== Kickboxing record ==
Professional Kickboxing record
Date	Result	Opponent	Event	Location	Method	Round	Time
2007-10-27	Win	(United States) Scott Mukaddam	Ring of Combat 16	Atlantic City, United States	Decision (Unanimous)	10	2:00
Wins the vacant ISKA Full Contact World Welterweight (147 lbs) title.
2007-	Win	(United States) Duonmonk Octunbuyer		United States	Decision		
2007-02-02	Win	(Puerto Rico) Orlando Sanchez Ruiz	Combat at the Capitale	New York City, United States	TKO (retirement)	3	2:00
2006-	Win	(England) George Pattison		United Kingdom	Decision (Unanimous)	8	2:00
2006-09-29	Win	(Montenegro) Peter Kaljevic	Combat at the Capitale	New York City, United States	Decision (Unanimous)	10	2:00
Defends WKA Full Contact World Super Welterweight (154 lbs) title.
2006-06-24	Loss	(United States) Scott Mukaddam	World Combat League	Uncasville, Connecticut, United States	KO (Right hook)	1	2:59
2006-01-21	Loss	(United States) Manny Reyes Jr	World Combat League	Uncasville, Connecticut, United States	TKO (Doctor stoppage)	1	1:15
2006-01-21	Win	(Kazakhstan) Rimat Myrzabekov	World Combat League	Uncasville, Connecticut, United States	KO (Body kick)	1	2:12
2005-11-18	Win	(Canada) Brad Fowler		New York City, United States	KO (Left hook to the body)	8	
Wins the vacant WKA Full Contact World Super Welterweight (154 lbs) title.
2005-07-22	Win	(United States) Tommy Rodriguez	Ring Of Fire Kickboxing	Lake Grove, New York, United States	KO (High kick)		
2005-04-01	Win	(United States) Tarek Rached	Top Kick: Superfights 2005	Lake Grove, New York, United States	Decision (Unanimous)	6	2:00
2004-12-03	Win	(Dominican Republic) Edwin Montero		Lake Grove, New York, United States	KO (High kick)		
2004-04-02	Win	(United States) Guerino Pavone	Top Kick: Superfights 2004	Lake Grove, New York, United States	Decision (Unanimous)	6	2:00
2003-11-14	Win	(United States) Tom Ingargiola	Top Kick: Superfights 2003	Lake Grove, New York, United States	TKO		
Legend: Win Loss Draw/No contest Notes

Sporting positions
World boxing titles
Vacant Title last held by Alex Saucedo	WBO International junior welterweight champion January 18, 2019 – present	Incumbent
World boxing titles
Preceded by Ruslan Provodnikov	WBO junior welterweight champion June 14, 2014 – November 2, 2014; Vacated	Vacant Title next held by Terence Crawford
Awards
Previous: Marcos Maidana; UD12 Adrien Broner	The Ring Upset of the Year; SD12 Ruslan Provodnikov; 2014	Next: Tyson Fury; UD12 Wladimir Klitschko
