= Mike Jones (boxer) =

American Boxer (born 1983)

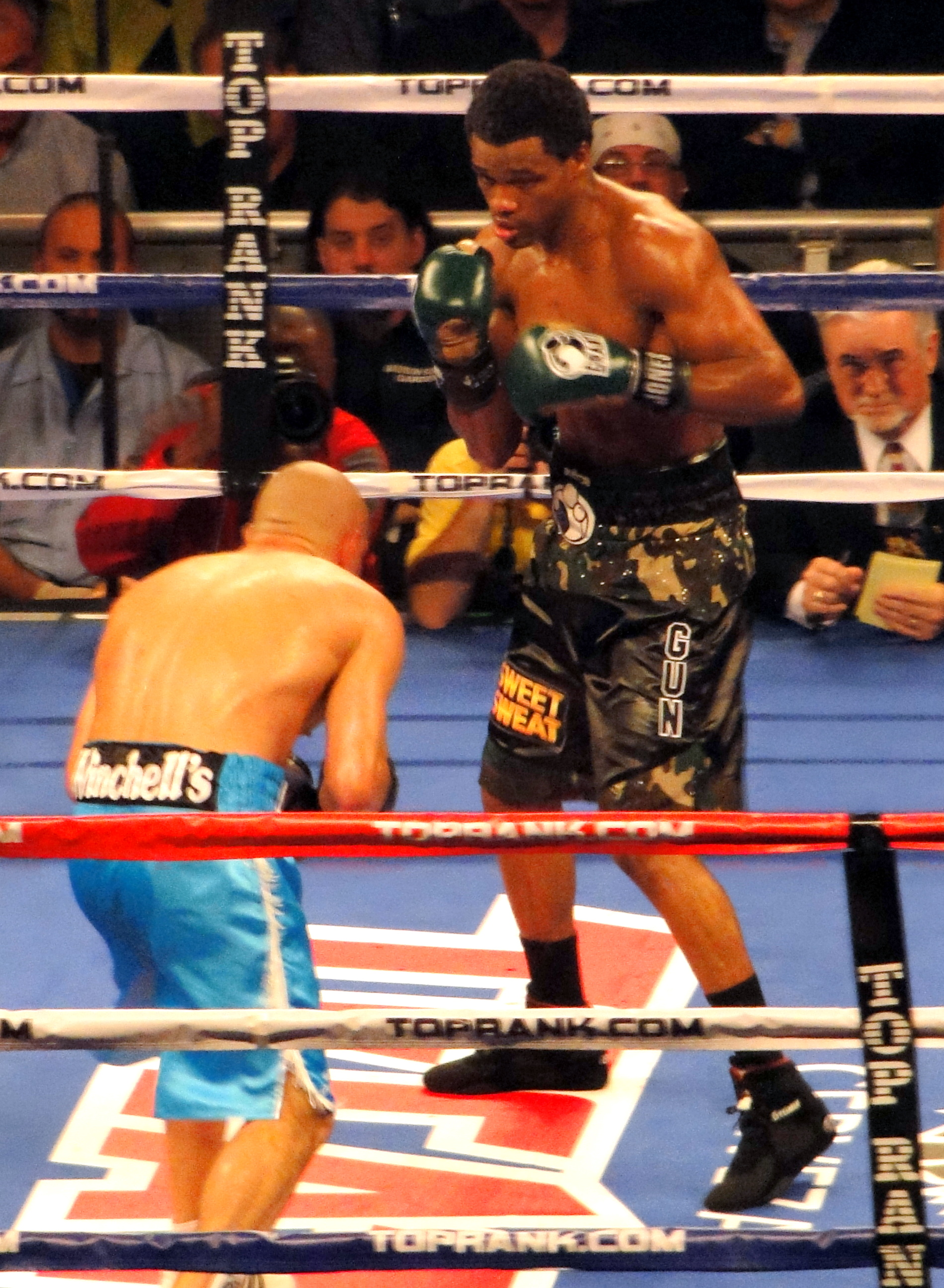
- Jones (right) vs. Luján, 2011

Personal information
- Nickname: Machine Gun
- Nationality: American
- Born: April 26, 1983 (age 43) Philadelphia, Pennsylvania, U.S.
- Height: 6 ft 0 in (183 cm)
- Weight: Welterweight

Boxing career
- Reach: 72 in (183 cm)
- Stance: Orthodox

Boxing record
- Total fights: 28
- Wins: 26
- Win by KO: 19
- Losses: 2

Mike Jones (born April 26, 1983) is an American former professional boxer who competed from 2005 to 2014. He held the regional WBA–NABA and WBO–NABO welterweight titles.

== Professional career ==
Mike Jones made his professional boxing debut on December 16, 2005 at the age of 22 against Jason Thompson who he would defeat by a second round technical knockout. By May 2007 Jones had compiled a record of 7-0, all by knockout no later than the third round. It was around this time that Jones was featured on the undercard of the Hugo Fidel Cazares vs. Wilfrido Valdez fight.

On August 29, 2008, Jones defeated Juliano Ramos to win the vacant NABA Welterweight title.

On April 17, 2010, Jones defeated Hector Munoz to defend his NABA title but also to win the vacant WBO NABO welterweight title.

On November 13, 2010, Jones fought in Arlington, Texas vs. Jesus Soto Karass, on the undercard of Manny Pacquiao vs. Antonio Margarito. Many argued Karass was the winner, but the decision went the way of Jones. A rematch was made and Jones won.

Before the fight, Jones did a little mitt work with Floyd Mayweather Sr. "Floyd Mayweather said that with both hands, Mike is the hardest-hitting welterweight that he has ever worked the mitts with, and that he hits harder than Thomas Hearns," said Vaughn Jackson. "He said that if he continues to hit that way, then no welterweight will stand, and that includes Soto-Karass."

On December 3, 2011, Jones defeated Sebastian Andres Lujan by unanimous decision in an IBF Welterweight Title Eliminator. The fight took place at Madison Square Garden on the under card of Miguel Cotto vs Antonio Margarito II.

On June 9, 2012, Mike Jones fought Randall Bailey on the Pacquiao vs. Bradley undercard. Jones was knocked down in the 10th and stopped in the 11th round by veteran Bailey. After a two-year layoff, Jones came back against Jaime Herrera. Jones lost that fight as well and has not fought since, maintaining a professional record of 26-2, 19 KOs.

On October 12, 2025, Mike Jones was officially inducted into the Pennsylvania Boxing Hall of Fame as part of the Class of 2025 in the category of Modern Era Boxer: Welterweight / World Title Challenger. Jones was additionally honored by being the sole inductee introduced by Judge Jacqui Frazier-Lyde due to Jones' history of training Frazier-Lyde, as well as Jones' relationship with her father Joe Frazier and other members of the Frazier family. The ceremony took place at the Philadelphia Ballroom. Jones attended the event with his fiancée, daughters, and other family members.

== Professional boxing record ==
26 Wins (18 knockouts), 2 loss(es), 0 Draw, 0 No Contest
Res.	Record	Opponent	Type	Rd., Time	Date	Location	Notes
Loss	26-2	(United States) Jaime Herrera	RTD	7 (10)	2014-08-23	(United States) Bally's Event Center, Atlantic City, New Jersey	
Loss	26-1	(United States) Randall Bailey	KO	11 (12)	2012-06-09	(United States) MGM Grand, Las Vegas, Nevada	For vacant IBF welterweight title.
Win	26-0	(Argentina) Sebastian Lujan	UD	12	2011-12-03	(United States) Madison Square Garden, New York, New York	IBF Welterweight Title Eliminator.
Win	25-0	(United States) Raúl Muñoz	KO	2 (10)	2011-06-25	(United States) South Philly Arena, Philadelphia, Pennsylvania	
Win	24-0	(Mexico) Jesus Soto Karass	UD	12	2011-02-19	(United States) Mandalay Bay Resort & Casino, Las Vegas, Nevada	Retained NABA, WBO NABO, & WBC Continental Americas welterweight titles.
Win	23-0	(Mexico) Jesus Soto Karass	MD	10	2010-11-13	(United States) Cowboys Stadium, Arlington, Texas	Retained NABA, WBO NABO, & won vacant WBC Continental Americas welterweight titles.
Win	22-0	(Puerto Rico) Irving Garcia	KO	5 (12)	2010-07-09	(United States) Boardwalk Hall, Atlantic City, New Jersey	Retained NABA welterweight title & WBO NABO welterweight title.
Win	21-0	(United States) Hector Munez	TKO	5 (10)	2010-04-17	(United States) Boardwalk Hall, Atlantic City, New Jersey	Retained NABA welterweight title & won vacant WBO NABO welterweight title.
Win	20-0	(Puerto Rico) Henry Bruseles	UD	10	2010-02-27	(United States) Bally's Atlantic City, Atlantic City, New Jersey	Retained NABA Welterweight title.
Win	19-0	(Colombia) Raul Pinzon	KO	5 (10)	2009-11-07	(United States) Bally's Atlantic City, Atlantic City, New Jersey	
Win	18-0	(Costa Rica) Lenin Arroyo	UD	10	2009-08-08	(United States) Bally's Atlantic City, Atlantic City, New Jersey	Retained NABA Welterweight title.
Win	17-0	(Colombia) Dairo Esalas	KO	2 (10)	2009-03-06	(United States) The Blue Horizon Philadelphia, Pennsylvania	Retained NABA Welterweight title.
Win	16-0	(Mexico) Luciano Perez	TKO	3 (10)	2008-12-05	(United States) Sovereign Center Reading, Pennsylvania	
Win	15-0	(Brazil) Juliano Ramos	TKO	6 (10)	2008-08-29	(United States) New Alhambra Philadelphia, Pennsylvania	Won vacant NABA Welterweight title.
Win	14-0	(United States) Gilbert Venegas	UD	8	2008-05-09	(United States) New Alhambra Philadelphia, Pennsylvania	
Win	13-0	(United States) Germaine Sanders	UD	8	2008-03-28	(United States) Seneca Allegany Casino Salamanca, New York	
Win	12-0	(United States) Israel Cardona	TKO	3 (8)	2007-11-09	(United States) New Alhambra Philadelphia, Pennsylvania	
Win	11-0	(United States) Richard Hall	TKO	1 (8)	2007-10-05	(United States) New Alhambra Philadelphia, Pennsylvania	
Win	10-0	(United States) Martinus Clay	KO	5 (8)	2007-08-31	(United States) Seneca Allegany Casino Salamanca, New York	
Win	9-0	(Puerto Rico) Doel Carrasquillo	RTD	2 (8)	2007-07-20	(United States) New Alhambra Philadelphia, Pennsylvania	
Win	8-0	(United States) Gilbert Guevara	TKO	1 (6)	2007-05-04	(United States) MGM Grand Las Vegas, Nevada	
Win	7-0	(Mexico) Francisco Maldonado	KO	2 (6)	2007-03-02	(United States) New Alhambra Philadelphia, Pennsylvania	
Win	6-0	(United States) Donnie Fosmire	TKO	3 (6)	2007-01-15	(United States) Northern Quest Casino, Airway Heights, Washington	
Win	5-0	(United States) Jason Jordan	TKO	1 (6)	2006-11-17	(United States) New Alhambra Philadelphia, Pennsylvania	
Win	4-0	(United States) Todd Brad Dillon	KO	1 (4)	2006-09-29	(United States) New Alhambra Philadelphia, Pennsylvania	
Win	3-0	(United States) Ronny Glover	KO	1 (4)	2006-08-02	(United States) New Alhambra Philadelphia, Pennsylvania	
Win	2-0	(United States) Chris Gray	TKO	2 (4)	2006-03-03	(United States) New Alhambra Philadelphia, Pennsylvania	
Win	1-0	(United States) Jason Thompson	TKO	2 (4)	2005-12-16	(United States) New Alhambra Philadelphia, Pennsylvania	Mike's professional debut.
