= Manny Pacquiao vs. Chris Algieri =

Boxing match

Hungry for Glory
- Date: 22 November 2014
- Venue: Cotai Arena, The Venetian, Macau, SAR
- Title(s) on the line: WBO welterweight title

Tale of the tape
Boxer	Manny Pacquiao	Chris Algieri
Nickname	"Pac-Man"	"The Fighting Collegian"
Hometown	General Santos, South Cotabato, Philippines	Huntington, New York, U.S.
Purse	$20,000,000	$1,675,000
Pre-fight record	56–5–2 (38 KO)	20–0 (8 KO)
Age	35 years, 11 months	30 years, 8 months
Height	5 ft 6 in (168 cm)	5 ft 10 in (178 cm)
Weight	143.8 lb (65 kg)	143.6 lb (65 kg)
Style	Southpaw	Orthodox
Recognition	WBO; Welterweight Champion; The Ring; No. 1 Ranked Welterweight; TBRB; No. 2 Ranked Welterweight; The Ring No. 4 ranked pound-for-pound fighter 8-division world champion	The Ring/TBRB; No. 3 Ranked Light Welterweight; Former Light welterweight champion

Result
- Pacquiao wins via 12-round unanimous decision (119-103, 119-103, 120-102)

Manny Pacquiao vs. Chris Algieri, billed as Hungry for Glory, was a professional boxing match contested on 22 November 2014, for the WBO welterweight championship. Pacquiao won via unanimous decision and retained his WBO welterweight championship.

== Background ==
The bout was held at the Venetian Macau resort & hotel in Macau.

=== National anthem singers ===
- United States (The Star-Spangled Banner): Melody Thornton
- Philippines (Lupang Hinirang): The Word Choir

== The fight ==
By: Lyle Fitzsimmons | CBSSports.com

Round 1: Thirty seconds in, Pacquiao lands a snapping straight left. Drives Algieri to the ropes with a right hand, though not entirely because of a flush landing. Algieri moves well, finally throws a combination after 90 seconds. Pacquiao rushes in and lands at 2:15 mark, doesn't appear to fear counters. Just then, Algieri lands a clean straight right lead. 10-9 Pacquiao

Round 2: Algieri jabs more in first 10 seconds than in entire first round, lands left hook as he moves. Algieri's left eye already showing redness. Pacquiao jumps in with left-right-left and it's called a knockdown, though it appears he slipped in the corner. Pacquiao lands overhand right at 2-minute mark that buckles Algieri for a moment, but he spins away. Pacquiao lands left to the body in final 10 seconds. Algieri showing no intention of planting his feet, but he's not yet establishing anything style-wise. 10-9 Pacquiao

Round 3: Pacquiao still pressing, but Algieri has landed a couple clean left hooks as lead shots. Pacquiao not yet able to mount sustained offensive action. Pacquiao body shot moves Algieri, and he lands another single right hand in the final 10 seconds. Algieri's best round of the three—he's having isolated moments—but he probably still didn't do enough to win it. 10-9 Pacquiao

Round 4: Algieri's corner is exhibiting confidence, but his lack of offense is making it difficult to see him winning any early rounds. Pacquiao scores inside with a short right uppercut at the midway point. Algieri lands a quick right hand with little effect, but it looked good. Pacquiao lands one-two combination with 30 seconds left, while Algieri scores with another right hand in the final 10 seconds. Still not enough attack for the challenger. 10-9 Pacquiao

Round 5: Algieri starts round with jabs and lands a straight right as Pacquiao approaches. He eludes a follow-up flurry from the champion, then replies with a right to the body that may have strayed low. The fighters touch glove as a symbolic gesture. Algieri leans in with a straight right to the head and looks more offensive than at any point so far. Pacquiao lunges with a short right and a long left, both miss. 10-9 Algieri

Round 6: Same blueprint early as Round 5, though Pacquiao does land a glancing left hand to the jaw. Algieri lands long right to the body and is warned, though it didn't at all look low. Pacquiao lands left that wobbles Algieri and he falls into a somersault, then rises. Pacquiao charges and drops Algieri in same corner in which he'd slipped earlier, though it may again have been a slip. Unlike the first time, though, this is a legit two-point round. 10-8 Pacquiao

Round 7: Algieri moving and flicking shots, but not landing anything noticeable as Pacquiao moves forward. Pacquiao lunges in with four shots midway through the round that don't score, but they show what's been occurring this round—Pacquiao is aggressive, Algieri is doing little to dissuade momentum. Algieri's best punch of the round is another long right hand to the body late, but it can't possibly be enough. At this point, it looks like lasting 12 rounds will be Algieri's best post-fight claim. 10-9 Pacquiao

Round 8: Not much of interest in the first half of the round, but Pacquiao counters an Algieri jab with a snapping left with 1:15 remaining. Algieri lands slapping left hook, which prompts another Pacquiao rush. Another snapping jab lands for Algieri in the last 10 seconds. It's getting hard to see many rounds that he's actually winning, though. He simply looks better in surviving some than others. 10-9 Algieri

Round 9: Algieri still moving and flicking. Pacquiao has landed a few lefts as a response. Sudden straight left drops Algieri flat on his back in a corner with 1:15 remaining, he wobbles up at 9. Upon rising, he takes a knee to avoid further damage. Pacquiao shakes off a clinch, continues battering along ropes. Algieri takes a big left-right at the bell. 10-7 Pacquiao

Round 10: Algieri's trainer, Tim Lane, is shown on HBO's broadcast before the round telling his man, "We are exactly where we need to be." Ummm... yeah. Algieri boxes and moves through initial 60 seconds of round, before Pacquiao lands a counter that again wobbles him. Algieri ducks to elude Pacquiao feints and almost twists himself to the floor. Another knockdown, the sixth of the night, comes from a left-right-left volley with 15 seconds left. He rises and jukes his way through the rest of the round. 10-8 Pacquiao

Round 11: Though his corner is insisting a rally is coming, Algieri looks like a guy who'll be thrilled to see the final bell. Pacquiao lands a straight left and smiles as Algieri rattles backward. Another left hand lands in the final 30 seconds, as it has in nearly every round previously. 10-9 Pacquiao

Round 12: Algieri lands a winging right that would have looked good had he not already been down six times. Pacquiao pursuing, but not in a hell-bent-for-leather fashion. Final minute arrives, "Manny, Manny" chant begins. Final 30 seconds, and it looks as if Pacquiao's knockout-less streak will stretch to nine fights. It does. 10-9 Pacquiao

Manny Pacquiao dominated the bout and scored an official six knockdowns en route to a lopsided victory via unanimous decision by the judges (119-103, 119-103 and 120-102).

== Aftermath ==
In January 2015, Pacquiao agreed to terms to face Floyd Mayweather Jr., finally setting the stage for their long-anticipated superfight. The bout was confirmed for May 2 later that year, billed as "The Fight of the Century."

== Fight card ==
Confirmed bouts:

Main card (HBO PPV)
Weight class				Method	Round	Time	Notes
Welterweight	Manny Pacquiao (c)	def.	Chris Algieri	UD	12/12		(Note: For WBO welterweight title)
Flyweight	Zou Shiming (c)	def.	Kwanpichit OnesongchaiGym	UD	12/12		(Note: For WBO International flyweight title)
Featherweight	Vasiliy Lomachenko (c)	def.	Chonlatarn Piriyapinyo	UD	12/12		(Note: For WBO featherweight title)
Super lightweight	Jessie Vargas (c)	def.	Antonio DeMarco	UD	12/12		(Note: For WBA super lightweight title)
Preliminary bouts
Super welterweight	Kuok Kun Ng	def.	Steve Attard	UD	6/6
Super flyweight	Rex Tso	def.	Espinos Sabu	UD	8/8
Super flyweight	Jerwin Ancajas	def.	Fadhili Majiha	KO	3/8	1:48
Light heavyweight	Andrew Robinson	def.	Peng Qu	SD	4/4

== International broadcasting ==
Country	Broadcaster
Australia	Main Event (pay-per-view); Fox Sports (cable)
Canada	Canal Indigo
Indonesia	tvOne
New Zealand	SKY Arena
Philippines	Solar All Access (pay-per-view); Solar Sports (cable); GMA Network (free-to-air)
Poland	Polsat Sport
South Africa	SuperSport
United Kingdom	BoxNation
United States	HBO PPV

Preceded by vs. Timothy Bradley II	Manny Pacquiao's bouts 22 November 2014	Succeeded by vs. Floyd Mayweather Jr.
Preceded by vs. Ruslan Provodnikov	Chris Algieri's bouts 22 November 2014	Succeeded by vs. Amir Khan
