= Manny Pacquiao vs. Juan Manuel Márquez III =

2011 boxing match

The 25th Round Begins
- Date: November 12, 2011
- Venue: MGM Grand Garden Arena, Las Vegas, Nevada, U.S.
- Title(s) on the line: WBO welterweight title

Tale of the tape
Boxer	Manny Pacquiao	Juan Manuel Márquez
Nickname	"Pac-Man"	Dinamita ("Dynamite")
Hometown	Malungon, Sarangani, Philippines	Mexico City, Mexico
Purse	$22,000,000	$5,000,000
Pre-fight record	53–3–2 (38 KO)	53–5–1 (39 KO)
Age	32 years, 10 months	38 years, 2 months
Height	5 ft 6 1/2 in (169 cm)	5 ft 7 in (170 cm)
Weight	143 lb (65 kg)	142 lb (64 kg)
Style	Southpaw	Orthodox
Recognition	WBO; Welterweight Champion; The Ring; No. 1 Ranked Welterweight; The Ring No. 1 ranked pound-for-pound fighter 8-division world champion	WBA (Super), WBO and The Ring; Lightweight Champion; The Ring No. 5 ranked pound-for-pound fighter 3-division world champion

Result
- Pacquiao wins via 12-round majority decision (114-114, 115-113, 116-112)

Manny Pacquiao vs. Juan Manuel Márquez III, billed as The 25th Round Begins, was a professional boxing match contested on November 12, 2011, for the WBO welterweight championship.

== Background ==
Pacquiao and Márquez had previously faced each other twice. Their first meeting, on May 8, 2004, at the MGM Grand, ended in a draw. They fought again on March 15, 2008, at the Mandalay Bay, where Pacquiao won via a split decision. Both encounters were shrouded in dispute with regards to who won and this subsequently led to a rubber match between the two fighters where Freddie Roach, Pacquiao's trainer, said that he wanted to leave "all doubt behind."

CNN broadcast HBO's 24/7 on free cable and in addition to the HBO Deal, Pacquiao-Marquez III was promoted during the Major League Baseball playoffs on TBS. A four-city press tour covering an estimated 25,000 miles across three countries started on September 3 in Pacquiao's adopted hometown of Manila and ended on September 8 in Mexico City. The bout marked the second time Marquez jumped from Lightweight to Welterweight. His first attempt was a September 2009 loss to Floyd Mayweather Jr., who was making his return to boxing.

The bout took place at the MGM Grand in Las Vegas, Nevada and was distributed by HBO PPV at a catchweight of 144 lbs. The fight also marked a return to HBO for Pacquiao and drew 1.4 million pay-per-view buys.

=== National anthem singers ===
- Philippines (Lupang Hinirang) – Maria Aragon
- Mexico (Himno Nacional Mexicano) – Cristian Castro
- USA (The Star-Spangled Banner) – Thia Megia

=== Entrance performers ===
Like what was done before with Manny Pacquiao's previous fight against Shane Mosley, Jimi Jamison, the former lead vocalist of the band Survivor, sang "Eye of the Tiger" as Pacquiao approached the ring.

"No me se rajar" was the mariachi song that accompanied Juan Manuel Marquez during his entrance. It was performed by Raul Sandoval, a popular Mexican mariachi singer.

=== Judges ===
- Robert Hoyle
- Dave Moretti
- Glenn Trowbridge

== The fight ==
Pacquiao defeated Márquez via majority decision 114–114, 115–113, and 116–112. Upon the results being announced, the crowd reaction was largely negative with thousands continuing to boo as Pacquiao spoke with Max Kellerman.

== Aftermath ==
According to Compubox, Marquez was outlanded an average of 3 punches per round (14 to 11 punches landed). Pacquiao also threw 142 punches more than Marquez and landed 38 more punches, connecting at a higher percentage rate in power shots. Though in jabs, Marquez turned out to be the one landing at a higher rate, despite being outlanded 59 to 38.

=== Controversy ===
Even though Pacquiao won a close decision, Marquez's fans in the audience believed that Marquez had won the fight. Some of the audience reacted to the decision by hurling food, beer, and ice; a can of beer hit a ringside writer, though no record of any injuries exists. The Ring, which produces its own version of boxing's lineal championships, scored the bout in different ways: its editor, Michael Rosenthal, scored the bout 115–113 for Pacquiao; two of its writers, Lem Satterfield and Mike Koppinger, scored the bout for Marquez 117–111 respectively. Another writer – Doug Fischer, scored the bout a draw.

Some Filipino TV news networks and their internet news websites showed photos of Marquez stepping on Pacquiao’s foot six times. However, such occurrences are common between orthodox and southpaw fighters as they attempt to keep their lead foot on the outside of their opponent's. Freddie Roach has addressed the Juan Manuel Marquez "foot-stomping" issue that has become a much discussed topic among Manny Pacquiao fans; he understands that when southpaws and orthodox fight, feet will inevitably collide.

== Main card ==
Confirmed bouts:

- Welterweight Championship bout: (Philippines) Manny Pacquiao vs. (Mexico) Juan Manuel Márquez
  - Pacquiao defeats Márquez via Majority Decision. (114–114, 115–113, 116–112)
- Light Welterweight Championship bout: (United States) Timothy Bradley vs. (Cuba) Joel Casamayor
  - Bradley defeats Casamayor via technical knockout at 2:59 of the eight round.
- Light Welterweight bout: (United States) Mike Alvarado vs. (Colombia) Breidis Prescott
  - Alvarado defeats Prescott via technical knockout at 1:53 of the tenth round.
- Super Featherweight bout: (Mexico) Juan Carlos Burgos vs. (Puerto Rico) Luis Cruz
  - Burgos defeats Cruz via Majority Decision. (92–98, 95–95, 93–97)

=== Preliminary card ===
- Super Lightweight bout: (United States) José Benavidez vs. (Puerto Rico) Samuel Santana
  - Benavidez defeats Santana via Unanimous Decision. (60–50, 60–50, 60–50)
- Featherweight bout: (United States) Victor Pasillas vs. (United States) Jose Garcia
  - Pasillas defeats Garcia via Unanimous Decision. (40–36, 40–36, 40–36)
- Welterweight bout: (Philippines) Dennis Laurente vs. (Ghana) Ayi Bruce
  - Laurente defeats Bruce via knockout at 0:57 of the seventh round.
- Super Flyweight bout: (Philippines) Fernando Lumacad vs. (United States) Joseph Rios
  - Lumacad defeats Rios via Unanimous Decision. (74–77, 73–77, 72–78)

=== Main event scorecards ===
Nevada State Athletic Commission Official score card
Title: WBO Welterweight					Referee: Tony Weeks					Supervisor: Francisco Valcaroel				
Date: November 12, 2011					Venue: MGM Grand Garden Arena, Las Vegas					Promoter: Top Rank				
Pacquiao		vs.	Marquez		Pacquiao		vs.	Marquez		Pacquiao		vs.	Marquez	
RS	TS	Rd	TS	RS	RS	TS	Rd	TS	RS	RS	TS	Rd	TS	RS
10		1		9	10		1		9	10		1		9
10	20	2	18	9	9	19	2	19	10	10	20	2	18	9
10	30	3	27	9	10	29	3	28	9	10	30	3	27	9
9	39	4	37	10	9	38	4	38	10	9	39	4	37	10
9	48	5	47	10	9	47	5	48	10	9	48	5	47	10
10	58	6	56	9	10	57	6	57	9	10	58	6	56	9
9	67	7	66	10	9	66	7	67	10	9	67	7	66	10
9	76	8	76	10	10	76	8	76	9	10	77	8	75	9
9	85	9	86	10	10	86	9	85	9	10	87	9	84	9
9	94	10	96	10	10	96	10	94	9	10	97	10	93	9
10	104	11	105	9	9	105	11	104	10	10	107	11	102	9
10	114	12	114	9	10	115	12	113	9	9	116	12	112	10
FINAL SCORE	114	–	114	FINAL SCORE	FINAL SCORE	115	–	113	FINAL SCORE	FINAL SCORE	116	–	112	FINAL SCORE
Draw			Draw		Won			Lost		Won			Lost	
Judge: Robert Hoyle					Judge: Dave Moretti					Judge: Glenn Trowbridge				
Suspensions: None					Point deductions: None					Decision: Manny Pacquiao by majority decision				

== Reported fight earnings ==
- Manny Pacquiao guaranteed $22 million vs. Juan Manuel Márquez $5 million
- Timothy Bradley $1,025,000 vs. Joel Casamayor $100,000
- Mike Alvarado $75,000 vs. Breidis Prescott $35,000
- Luis Cruz $35,000 vs. Juan Carlos Burgos $22,500

== International broadcasting ==
Country	Broadcaster
Aruba	ATV 15
Australia	Main Event
Belgium	Be Sport 1
Brazil	SporTV
Canada	RDS
Chile	Vive Deportes
Czech Republic	Sport 1
Denmark	TV 2 Sport
Estonia	Viasat Sport Baltic
France	Orange Sport
Hungary	Sport 2
Indonesia	RCTI
Italy	Sportitalia
Japan	WOWOW
Latin America	Golden
Latvia	Viasat Sport Baltic
Lithuania	Viasat Sport Baltic
Malaysia	Astro Box Office
Mexico	Azteca 7
New Zealand	Sky Arena
Norway	Viasat Sport
Philippines	GMA Network (terrestrial, delayed)
Philippines	Solar Sports (cable, delayed)
Philippines	Solar All Access (pay, live)
Poland	Polsat Sport
Qatar	Al Jazeera Sports
Romania	Digi Sport
Russia	NTV Plus
Slovakia	Sport 1
South Africa	SuperSport
Spain	MARCA TV
Sweden	TV10
Thailand	Channel 7
United Kingdom	Primetime
United States	HBO PPV
United States	US Military via AFN Sports

Preceded by vs. Shane Mosley	Manny Pacquiao's bouts 12 November 2011	Succeeded by vs. Timothy Bradley
Preceded by vs. Likar Ramos Concha	Juan Manuel Márquez's bouts 12 November 2011	Succeeded by vs. Serhiy Fedchenko
Awards
Previous: The failure to make Mayweather vs. Pacquiao	The Ring Event of the Year; 2011	Next: September 15: HBO and Showtime both hold boxing events in Las Vegas
