= Victor Pasillas =

American boxer (born 1992)

Personal information
- Nickname: Vicious
- Born: Victor Manuel Pasillas; February 17, 1992 (age 34) East Los Angeles, California, U.S.
- Height: 5 ft 6 in (168 cm)
- Weight: Super bantamweight Featherweight

Boxing career
- Reach: 66 in (170 cm)
- Stance: Southpaw

Boxing record
- Total fights: 20
- Wins: 19
- Win by KO: 11
- Losses: 1
- Draws: 0
- No contests: 0

Victor Manuel Pasillas (born February 17, 1992) is an American professional boxer who competes in the featherweight division.

== Amateur career ==
Pasillas has a phenomenal amateur record of 272–6. He has won 25 national amateur titles and holds notable wins over 2012 US olympians Jose Ramirez and Joseph Diaz.

Victor featured in the boxing documentary Born and Bred.

== Professional career ==
=== Early career ===
On November 12, 2011, Pasillas beat veteran Jose Garcia to win his professional debut. This bout was on the undercard of Manny Pacquiao vs. Juan Manuel Marquez III.

Pasillas was initially signed by Top Rank but the relationship eventually ended in 2015. He moved to the San Francisco Bay Area in 2014 after being brought north to spar Nonito Donaire at Undisputed Boxing Gym to train with head coach Brian Schwartz and Michael Bazzel in Redwood City Ca. Since then he has become a completely new man raising his 2 kids with his wife Jasmine Pasillas.

=== Recent activity ===
Pasillas experienced a lengthy period of inactivity, being out the ring from, 2021 to 2024 ,with multiple training camps and scheduled fights falling through. His BoxRec profile was listed as inactive for a period, which affected his visibility to matchmakers.

In March 2024, Pasillas was scheduled to face Jorge Villegas in a six-round bout at the Fox Theater in Redwood City, California, marking his return after a three-year layoff.

On May 23, 2025, Pasillas returned to the ring after a 14-month layoff, facing Carlos Jackson at The Avalon in Hollywood, California. The fight was broadcast on DAZN. Pasillas won the bout via technical knockout in the seventh round, improving his record to 18-1.

On January 23, 2021, Pasillas faced undefeated Ra'eese Aleem for the WBA interim super bantamweight title at the Mohegan Sun Arena in Montville, Connecticut. Pasillas suffered his first professional loss to Aleem . Pasillas revealed that his training camp was revolved around weight loss and not communicating with his coaches about him starting camp at 183 and cutting weight to 122 in just under 6 weeks.

== Personal life ==
Pasillas moved to Redwood City, California in 2014 and now considers the San Francisco Bay Area his second home. He credits his wife, Jasmine, who serves as his nutritionist, for helping him maintain proper weight for recent fights. Pasillas has stated that he now makes a six-figure income outside of boxing while continuing his professional career.

== Boxing record ==
Professional record: 19 wins, 1 loss (11 KOs)

=== Notable fights ===
- Loss vs Ra'eese Aleem (TKO, Round 11) – January 23, 2021, Montville, Connecticut – For WBA interim Super bantamweight title
- Win vs Carlos Jackson (TKO, Round 7) – May 23, 2025, Hollywood, California
- Win vs Ranfis Javier Encarnacion (TKO) – 2020, Los Angeles, California
