= Devon Alexander =

American boxer (born 1987)

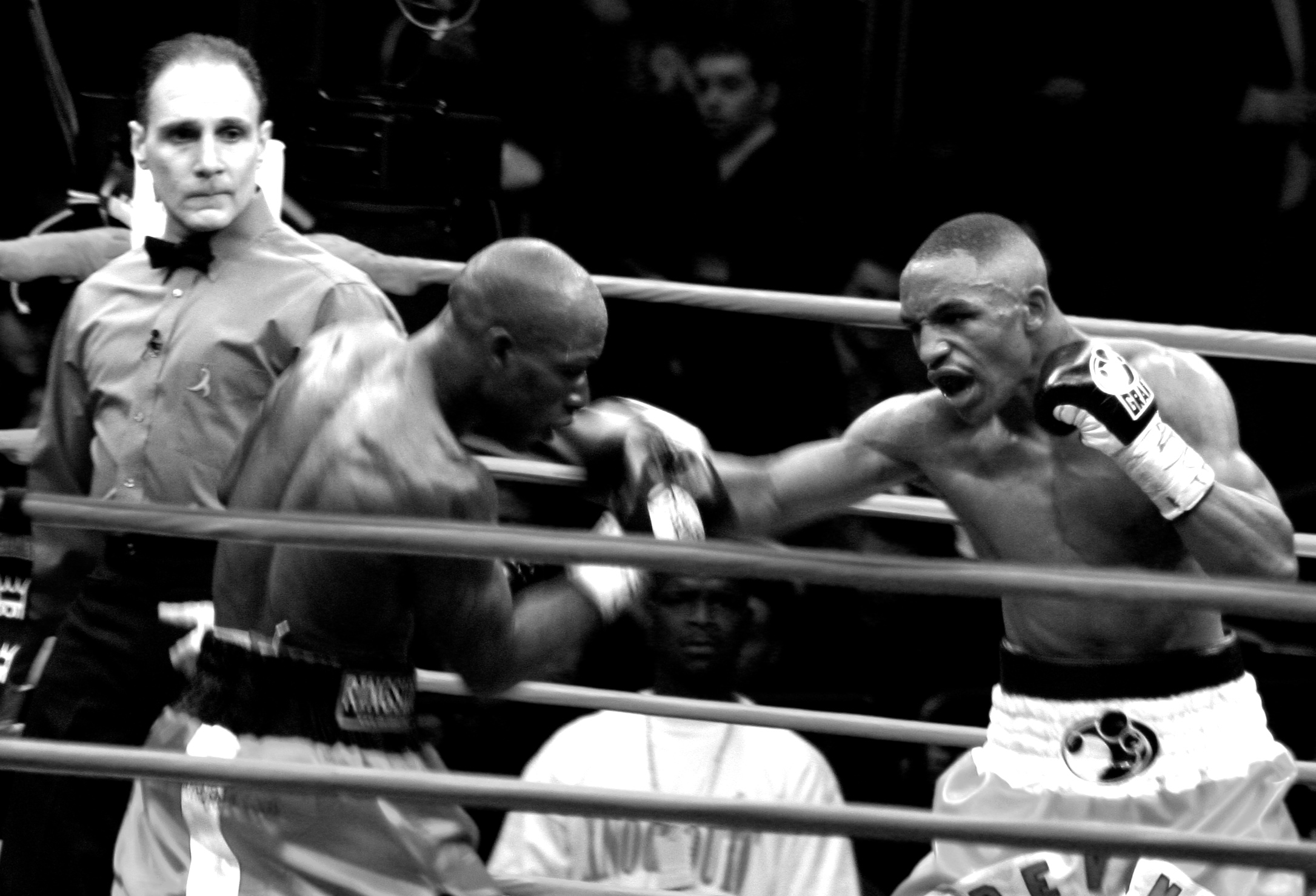
- Alexander (right) vs. DeMarcus Corley, 2008

Personal information
- Nickname: The Great
- Born: Devon Eugene Alexander; February 10, 1987 (age 39) St. Louis, Missouri, U.S.
- Height: 5 ft 8 1/2 in (174 cm)
- Weight: Light welterweight; Welterweight

Boxing career
- Reach: 69 in (175 cm)
- Stance: Southpaw

Boxing record
- Total fights: 37
- Wins: 27
- Win by KO: 14
- Losses: 9
- Draws: 1

Devon Alexander (born February 10, 1987) is an American professional boxer. He has held world championships in two weight divisions, including the unified World Boxing Council (WBC) and International Boxing Federation (IBF) light welterweight titles and the IBF welterweight title.

== Biography ==
Alexander grew up in the Hyde Park neighborhood of north St. Louis, Missouri in an area described as rough, gang- and drug-infested. He would later join the boxing gym that Kevin Cunningham, a former police officer and security officer at Clay Community Center, turned trainer, founded in the basement of an old police station.

Thirty kids joined the boxing program of Cunningham, who had hoped to keep the kids out of trouble, off the streets, and in the ring. A stablemate of Alexander's, Cory Spinks would become welterweight champion.

== Amateur career ==
Alexander had an outstanding amateur career, compiling a record of 300-10 under the tutelage of Cunningham. He was a four-time Silver Gloves champion from ages 10–14; three-time PAL national champion; Junior Golden Gloves and Junior Olympics national champion; 2003 United States national champion in the 19-and-under division; and 2004 United States light welterweight national champion. Alexander made it to the final round of the 2004 Olympic trials, where he battled Rock Allen to a draw and was knocked down once before losing on a tie-breaker.

== Professional career ==
=== Light welterweight ===
At age 17, Alexander made his professional debut, defeating Vincent Torres by first round technical knockout in Sault Sainte Marie, Michigan.

He went up against former WBO junior welterweight champion DeMarcus Corley on January 19, 2008, at Madison Square Garden in New York City. Alexander easily defeated Corley by unanimous decision.

==== Light welterweight title ====
On August 1, 2009, Alexander defeated Junior Witter to claim the vacant WBC light welterweight championship. Witter gave up on his stool after the eighth round, claiming that he had re-injured his left hand. Alexander was hurt by a right hand in round 2. All three judges had Alexander ahead at the time of the stoppage 79-73, 79-73, 80-72.

==== Alexander vs. Urango ====
Alexander was next scheduled to face two-time champion Juan Urango of Colombia in a title unification bout. The 6 March 2010 bout was held at the Mohegan Sun in Uncasville, Connecticut and was televised on HBO's "Boxing After Dark" telecast. To train for the fight, Alexander used a Las Vegas house lent by promoter Don King as training base. Devon Alexander defeated Juan Urango by TKO in round 8. Alexander threw an uppercut which dropped Urango. Urango made the count but Alexander resumed his attack and threw a hook to Urango's temple which again dropped him. Urango stood up but was clearly dazed, resulting in a stoppage by the referee. Urango, who suffered his first KO defeat, called out Timothy Bradley after the fight, but a fight was never made because Bradley just moved up to welterweight.

In his next fight he faced Andreas Kotelnik, the former WBA Light Welterweight champion, in his hometown of St. Louis Missouri on 7 August in front of members of the St. Louis Rams, Evander Holyfield and Floyd Mayweather. Alexander won the fight by a controversial unanimous decision with all judges scoring the fight 116-112.

On October 22, 2010, Alexander was stripped of the IBF Junior Welterweight title for not fighting the no. 1 contender, Kaizer Mabuza.

==== Alexander vs. Bradley ====
Alexander's next fight, on January 29, 2011, took place against Timothy Bradley, which he lost via 10th round TD after an unintentional head-butt forced a stop to the bout.

==== Alexander vs. Matthysse ====
On June 25, 2011, Alexander defeated Lucas Matthysse in a controversial split decision. The judges scored the fight 96-93 and 95-94 for Alexander and 96-93 for Matthysse.

=== Welterweight ===
On February 25, 2012 Alexander moved up to welterweight and put on a dominating performance against highly regarded and hard-charging Marcos Maidana. Alexander landed the right hook at will, catching Maidana with his left hand down throughout the contest. Maidana was seemingly surprised by both the speed and power Alexander displayed at his first fight at welterweight. Only one of the three judges had Maidana winning a round. The impressive nature of the win earned Alexander a title match with Randall Bailey in September 2012. Alexander was criticized by some however, for fighting illegally at some points during the fight.

Alexander was scheduled to fight titlest Randall Bailey as a main event on Showtime Championship Boxing on September 8, 2012, but Bailey withdrew due to injury. Their fight was replaced with the original undercard fight between Olusegun Ajose and Lucas Matthysse and an originally scheduled non-televised fight between J'Leon Love and Ramon Valenzuela was changed to a televised bout.

==== Welterweight title ====
Alexander returned to action on October 20, 2012, at the Barclays Center in Brooklyn, where he won the IBF Welterweight title by unanimous decision against Ring Top 10 Welterweight, Randall Bailey. The fight was fought at a comfortable pace for Alexander, with very few exchanges, as Bailey did not let his hands go very often. In a one sided fight, Alexander won his third world title in his second division.

Alexander's next fight was originally supposed to happen on January 19, 2013, against mandatory challenger and Ring No. 3 ranked Welterweight, Kell Brook. However, Brook suffered an ankle injury during training, and the fight was rescheduled for May 18, 2013 in Atlantic City. Alexander's camp and some boxing insiders have questioned the authenticity of this injury and assert that Brook was simply not ready to step up in class to fight ("ducking") Alexander.

==== Shawn Porter loss ====
Alexander would lose the IBF Welterweight title to Shawn Porter on December 7, 2013 by unanimous decision with scores of 115-113, 116-112 and 116-112.

Brook later defeated Shawn Porter for the less than sparkling IBF Welterweight belt - somewhat clearing Brook of possibly ducking Alexander.

==== Amir Khan loss ====
Alexander lost the WBC Silver Welterweight title to Amir Khan on December 13, 2014 by a lopsided unanimous decision with scores of 119-109, 118-110, 120-108.

== Personal life ==
Devon Alexander is married to his high school sweetheart Cesily Alexander having 7 children together. Devon Alexander Jr, Cesily Alexander, Sevyn Alexander, Levon Alexander, Lesily Alexander, Evon Alexander, and Hevyn Alexander are all the names of Alexander kids.

== Professional boxing record ==
37 fights	27 wins	9 losses
By knockout	14	3
By decision	13	6
Draws	1	

No.	Result	Record	Opponent	Type	Round, time	Date	Location	Notes
37	Loss	27–9–1	Vlad Panin	TKO	2 (10), 1:52	May 24, 2024	River Cree Resort Casino, Edmonton, Canada	
36	Loss	27–8–1	Gabriel Maestre	RTD	3 (10), 3:00	Apr 8, 2023	Dignity Health Sports Park, Carson, California, U.S.	
35	Loss	27–7–1	Luke Santamaria	UD	10	Aug 7, 2021	Armory, Minneapolis, Minnesota, U.S.	
34	Loss	27–6–1	Ivan Redkach	KO	6 (10), 1:10	Jun 1, 2019	Soboba Casino, San Jacinto, California, U.S.	
33	Loss	27–5–1	Andre Berto	SD	12	Aug 4, 2018	Nassau Coliseum, Uniondale, New York, U.S.	
32	Draw	27–4–1	Victor Ortiz	MD	12	Feb 17, 2018	Don Haskins Center, El Paso, Texas, U.S.	
31	Win	27–4	Walter Castillo	UD	10	Nov 21, 2017	Coliseum, St. Petersburg, Florida, U.S	
30	Loss	26–4	Aaron Martinez	UD	10	Oct 14, 2015	Gila River Arena, Glendale, Arizona, U.S.	
29	Loss	26–3	Amir Khan	UD	12	Dec 13, 2014	MGM Grand Garden Arena, Paradise, Nevada, U.S.	For WBC Silver welterweight title
28	Win	26–2	Jesús Soto Karass	UD	10	Jun 21, 2014	StubHub Center, Carson, California, U.S.	
27	Loss	25–2	Shawn Porter	UD	12	Dec 7, 2013	Barclays Center, Brooklyn, New York, U.S.	Lost IBF welterweight title
26	Win	25–1	Lee Purdy	RTD	7 (12), 3:00	May 18, 2013	Boardwalk Hall, Atlantic City, New Jersey, U.S.	
25	Win	24–1	Randall Bailey	UD	12	Oct 20, 2012	Barclays Center, Brooklyn, New York, U.S.	Won IBF welterweight title
24	Win	23–1	Marcos Maidana	UD	10	Feb 25, 2012	Scottrade Center, St. Louis, Missouri, U.S.	
23	Win	22–1	Lucas Matthysse	SD	10	Jun 25, 2011	Family Arena, St. Charles, Missouri, U.S.	
22	Loss	21–1	Timothy Bradley	TD	10 (12), 3:00	Jan 29, 2011	Pontiac Silverdome, Pontiac, Michigan, U.S.	Lost WBC light-welterweight title; For WBO light welterweight title unintentional head butt forced scorecard decision
21	Win	21–0	Andreas Kotelnik	UD	12	Aug 7, 2010	Scottrade Center, St. Louis, Missouri, U.S.	Retained WBC and IBF light welterweight titles
20	Win	20–0	Juan Urango	TKO	8 (12), 1:12	Mar 6, 2010	Mohegan Sun Arena, Uncasville, Connecticut, U.S.	Retained WBC light welterweight title; Won IBF light welterweight title
19	Win	19–0	Junior Witter	RTD	8 (12), 3:00	Aug 1, 2009	Agua Caliente Casino, Rancho Mirage, California, U.S.	Won vacant WBC light welterweight title
18	Win	18–0	Jesús Rodríguez	KO	9 (10), 0:58	Apr 24, 2009	Scottrade Center, St. Louis, Missouri, U.S.	
17	Win	17–0	Christopher Fernandez	TKO	3 (8), 3:00	Dec 11, 2008	Prudential Center, Newark, New Jersey, U.S.	
16	Win	16–0	Sun-Haeng Lee	TKO	4 (10), 0:19	Nov 7, 2008	Sichuan Gymnasium, Chengdu, China	
15	Win	15–0	Miguel Callist	UD	12	Mar 27, 2008	Scottrade Center, St. Louis, Missouri, U.S.	Retained WBC Continental Americas light welterweight title
14	Win	14–0	DeMarcus Corley	UD	12	Jan 19, 2008	Madison Square Garden, New York City, New York, U.S.	Won vacant WBC Continental Americas light welterweight title
13	Win	13–0	Cory Peterson	TKO	1 (8), 2:59	Oct 13, 2007	Sears Centre, Hoffman Estates, Illinois, U.S.	
12	Win	12–0	Marcus Luck	KO	3 (8), 1:24	Jul 7, 2007	The Arena at Harbor Yard, Bridgeport, Connecticut, U.S.	
11	Win	11–0	Scott Ball	KO	7 (8), 0:59	Mar 2, 2007	Belterra Casino Resort & Spa, Florence, Indiana, U.S.	
10	Win	10–0	Maximino Cuevas	TKO	4 (4), 2:02	Jan 6, 2007	Hard Rock Live, Hollywood, Florida, U.S.	
9	Win	9–0	Tyler Ziolkowski	TKO	1 (10), 2:40	Jul 8, 2006	Savvis Center, St. Louis, Missouri, U.S.	Won vacant WBC Youth welterweight title
8	Win	8–0	Seth Hebenstreit	UD	6	Mar 9, 2006	The Spott, St. Louis, Missouri, U.S.	
7	Win	7–0	Kelly Wright	UD	6	Oct 21, 2005	Savvis Center, St. Louis, Missouri, U.S.	
6	Win	6–0	Christian Nash	TKO	2 (4), 2:28	Sep 30, 2005	Noa Noa Night Club, Stone Park, Illinois, U.S.	
5	Win	5–0	John Rudolph	TKO	3 (4), 1:01	Jun 2, 2005	Family Arena, St. Charles, Missouri, U.S.	
4	Win	4–0	Felix Lora	UD	6	May 21, 2005	United Center, Chicago, Illinois, U.S.	
3	Win	3–0	Donovan Castaneda	UD	6	Feb 5, 2005	Savvis Center, St. Louis, Missouri, U.S.	
2	Win	2–0	Karl Hunter	UD	4	Jun 3, 2004	Ambassador Club, St. Louis, Missouri, U.S.	
1	Win	1–0	Vincent Torres	TKO	1 (4), 0:52	May 20, 2004	Kewadin Casino, Sault Ste. Marie, Michigan, U.S.	

== Titles in boxing ==
=== Major world titles ===
- IBF light welterweight champion (140 lbs)
- WBC light welterweight champion (140 lbs)
- IBF welterweight champion (147 lbs)

=== Regional/International titles ===
- WBC Continental Americas light welterweight champion (140 lbs)
- WBC Youth welterweight champion (147 lbs)

== See also ==
- List of male boxers
- List of southpaw stance boxers
- List of world light-welterweight boxing champions
- List of world welterweight boxing champions

Sporting positions
Amateur boxing titles
Previous: Lamont Peterson	U.S. light welterweight champion 2004	Next: Karl Dargan
Regional boxing titles
Vacant Title last held by Timothy Bradley	WBC Youth welterweight champion July 8, 2006 – 2007; Vacated	Vacant Title next held by James de la Rosa
Vacant Title last held by Michel Rosales	WBC Continental Americas light welterweight champion January 19, 2008 – 2008; Vacated	Vacant Title next held by Jo Jo Dan
World boxing titles
Vacant Title last held by Timothy Bradley	WBC light welterweight champion August 1, 2009 – January 29, 2011	Succeeded by Timothy Bradley
Preceded by Juan Urango	IBF light welterweight champion March 6 – October 22, 2010; Stripped	Vacant Title next held by Zab Judah
Preceded by Randall Bailey	IBF welterweight champion October 20, 2012 – December 7, 2013	Succeeded by Shawn Porter
