= Timothy Bradley =

American boxer (born 1983)

Personal information
- Nickname: Desert Storm
- Born: Timothy Ray Bradley Jr. August 29, 1983 (age 43) Palm Springs, California, U.S.
- Height: 5 ft 6 in (168 cm)
- Weight: Light welterweight; Welterweight

Boxing career
- Reach: 69 in (175 cm)
- Stance: Orthodox

Boxing record
- Total fights: 37
- Wins: 33
- Win by KO: 13
- Losses: 2
- Draws: 1
- No contests: 1

Timothy Ray Bradley Jr. (born August 29, 1983) is an American former professional boxer who competed from 2004 to 2016. He held multiple world championships in two weight classes, including the World Boxing Council (WBC) light welterweight world title twice between 2008 and 2011, the World Boxing Organization (WBO) light welterweight world title from 2009 to 2012, and the WBO welterweight world title twice between 2012 and 2016.

In October 2013, Bradley was ranked as the world's third-best active boxer, pound for pound, by The Ring magazine. He is particularly known for his trilogy of fights against Manny Pacquiao, whom he fought in 2012, 2014, and 2016. Bradley was inducted into the International Boxing Hall of Fame as part of the class of 2023.

== Professional career ==
=== Light welterweight ===
==== Early career ====
Bradley had his first professional bout on August 20, 2004, knocking out Francisco Martinez in the second round. In his rise through the ranks, he won the WBC youth world welterweight and super lightweight crowns. He also beat future IBF lightweight champion Miguel Vazquez by a unanimous ten-round decision.

==== Bradley vs. Witter, Holt ====
Bradley finally got his chance for a full world title when José Luis Castillo failed to make weight in a title eliminator for the WBC super lightweight belt. He then won the WBC super lightweight title by defeating British fighter Junior Witter on May 10, 2008, in Nottingham, England. Bradley's bank account was down to $11 when he made the decision to go to England to fight Junior Witter. Bradley came into the fight a 6–1 underdog against Witter. During the fight, Bradley controlled most of the action, and dropped Witter in his corner during the 6th round. Though the fight was scored a close split decision for Bradley, most observers and analysts thought Bradley should have comfortably been given a unanimous decision verdict. One judge scored the fight 115-112 for Witter and the remaining two judges scored the fight 115-113 and 114-113 respectively, for Bradley.

On April 4, 2009, Bradley fought Kendall Holt to unify his WBC and Holt's WBO titles. Bradley was dropped in the first round by a huge left hook and was badly hurt but regrouped and outboxed Holt for most of the fight, before being sent to the canvas again in the 12th round. Nonetheless, Bradley got up and finished the fight. He won the fight by unanimous decision and became the new WBO champion.

Several days after his unification bout with Holt, Bradley was stripped of his WBC junior welterweight title, because of failure to fight Devon Alexander, his mandatory challenger. As a result, the title became vacant and Alexander stopped Witter at the end of eight rounds to win the belt.

The Alexander-Witter fight was on the undercard of Bradley's August 1 fight with Nate Campbell in Bradley's hometown of Palm Springs. Campbell, a former lightweight champion, was coming up in weight after he failed to make the lightweight limit in his last fight. Bradley's fight with Campbell only lasted three rounds after Campbell chose not to continue when a cut formed over and behind his left eye. Bradley was awarded the TKO victory, but the verdict was later changed. A replay showed that the cut was caused by an accidental clash of heads. The rules state that if a fight is stopped by a cut caused by an accidental headbutt before the end of round four, it should be called a no contest. The California State Athletic Commission therefore changed the result.

==== Bradley vs. Peterson ====
In April 2009, Lamont Peterson defeated French boxer Willy Blain for the vacant WBO Interim title, making him mandatory to full titleholder Bradley. The fight took place at Agua Caliente Casino in Rancho Mirage, California, on December 12, 2009. Bradley dropped Peterson with an overhand right in the third round. However, Peterson got up and landed hard left hooks to the body. Peterson cut under the left eye from an accidental headbutt in round 12. After 12 rounds, the judges scored the fight 120–107, 119-108 and 118–110 in favour of Bradley, retaining his title and handing Peterson his first professional loss. The bout was televised as a main event on Showtime Championship Boxing. After the bout, Peterson told Showtime, "My game plan was to win the first round, but in the middle of the first round, I got hit real hard by a couple of right hands. It really bothered me. I lost the round, I fell behind, I got reckless. I couldn't make it up. I gave it all I had. He's a great champion."

=== Welterweight ===
==== Bradley vs. Abregu ====
In his HBO Debut, Bradley was scheduled to face Luis Abregu in a non-title bout at welterweight. However, Bradley's promoter told ESPN.com that he had made a deal with Golden Boy Promotions to fight Interim title holder and knockout artist: Marcos "El Chino" Maidana, at the Agua Caliente Casino in Rancho Mirage, California, only a few miles from Bradley's hometown of Palm Springs. The fight was scheduled to take place on June 19, 2010, but was postponed after Maidana had suffered a back injury during training for the fight. As a result, the initial plan to move up in weight was made and the fight with Abregu was back on, scheduled for the Agua Caliente Casino, along with a set fight date of July 17, 2010. Although clearly out-sized, Bradley proved too quick and too skilled for the hard-hitting Abregu winning by unanimous decision, with the judges' scorecards reading 119–111, 118–112 and 117–113.

At the end of the fight, Bradley openly made a challenge to pound-for-pound king Manny Pacquiao, calling for him to "Come break down this wall." Bradley also called out Devon Alexander, Amir Khan and Marcos Maidana.

=== Return to Light welterweight ===
==== Bradley vs. Alexander ====
On January 29, 2011, Timothy Bradley defended his WBO junior welterweight title in a unification fight against fellow light welterweight title holder, WBC champion Devon Alexander, at the Silverdome Arena in Pontiac, Michigan. Bradley won via 10th-round technical decision.

As stipulated in the contract of the fight against Devon Alexander, Bradley would be given a $1.3 million payday regardless of whomever he selected as his opponent for his next fight. While the public wanted Bradley to fight the then WBA light welterweight champion Amir Khan and unify the division, Bradley opted to not take the fight.

==== Stripped of WBC Title ====
Timothy Bradley was stripped of his title as he refused to fight then World Boxing Association light welterweight champion Amir Khan. Many had speculated that Bradley was not satisfied with the $1.3 million to fight a boxer of Amir Khan's caliber, although this was Bradley highest pay day in his entire career so far. Also, he had admitted that it was too risky to fight Amir Khan, asking rhetorically on the American radio show Leave It In The Ring, "What if I lose then I am out the sweepstake to fight pound-for-pound-king Manny Pacquiao for 7.5 million dollars?" Bradley's refusal to take the fight led to a falling out between him and his promoter Gary Shaw. Subsequently, he was stripped of the WBC title due to inactivity.

==== Bradley vs. Casamayor ====
Timothy Bradley joined Top Rank and made his debut for them on November 12, 2011, defending his WBO junior welterweight title against former lightweight titlist Joel Casamayor, 40, on the undercard of Pacquiao vs. Marquez III. Bradley won by TKO in the eighth round in making his case for a shot at Pacquiao.

=== Return to Welterweight ===
==== Bradley vs. Pacquiao ====
Bradley fought Manny Pacquiao on June 9, 2012, for Pacquiao's WBO welterweight title. Bradley won a controversial victory over Pacquiao by way of split decision, with two of the judges scoring it 115–113 to Bradley and the other 115–113 to Pacquiao. The decision ended Pacquiao's 7-year undefeated streak and gave Bradley the title. According to Compubox, Pacquiao was ahead in punches landed, power punches landed, percentage of punches landed, and percentage of power punches landed. As a result of the controversial scoring, a special five-judge panel was created by World Boxing WBO President Francisco "Paco" Valcarcel to review the fight. All five judges of the panel reviewed a video of the bout and all 5 judges scored it in favor of Manny Pacquiao. Despite the panel's findings, WBO rules do not allow the decision to be overturned. The most the boxing body can do, according to Valcarcel, is to order a rematch.

==== Bradley vs. Provodnikov, Marquez ====
Bradley won a close unanimous decision against Ruslan Provodnikov on March 16, 2013, for the WBO welterweight championship. Provodnikov was given the fight to serve as an easy target for Bradley, who was looking for a confidence booster after a controversial fight with Manny Pacquiao. Bradley came out on the attack early, fighting in an uncharacteristically aggressive fashion. Provodnikov made him pay, tagging him with hard shots in the first round, and staggering him in the second. Bradley said post-fight that he was concussed by a shot Provodnikov hit him with in the first round. Bradley boxed more conservatively as the fight wore on, winning most of the middle rounds. In the last round, Provodnikov again hurt Bradley badly and appeared ready to deliver a KO, but with time running out Bradley deliberately took a knee to get called for a knockdown. He was easily able to beat the count (which finished only seconds before the final bell) as a result and hung on to win the fight on points. Bradley was impressed by Provodnikov's power and said that "he's going to be a world champion someday."

Bradley's bout with Ring #3 ranked pound for pound, Ring #5 ranked junior lightweight and WBO junior welterweight champion Juan Manuel Márquez was held on October 12, 2013, at the Thomas & Mack Center in Las Vegas, Nevada. Bradley was awarded a split decision win, in a fight where he wobbled Márquez in the final round with a left uppercut en route to winning via split decision with scorecards of 116–112, 115–113 and 113–115.

==== Bradley vs. Pacquiao II ====
Bradley gave Manny Pacquiao a rematch on April 12, 2014. The second fight was closer than the first contest according to many pundits. Pacquiao pulled away on the scorecards in the second half of the fight winning with a unanimous decision (118–110, 116–112, 116–112), ending Bradley's undefeated streak.

==== Bradley vs. Chaves, Vargas ====
Following his first career loss to Manny Pacquiao, Bradley fought former WBA welterweight interim champion Diego Chaves of Argentina, in Cosmopolitan of Las Vegas, Las Vegas, Nevada on December 13, 2014. The official scorecards led to a controversial split-draw (Julie Lederman 112–116 for Chaves, Burt A. Clements 115–113 for Bradley, while Craig Metcalfe 114–114 for an even). Harold Lederman, HBO's unofficial judge, had it 116–112 for Bradley and the Compubox statistics heavily favored a Bradley win as they stated he had connected with 225 of 572 punches versus the 152 of 570 blows Chaves connected with.

Bradley fought and beat the undefeated boxer Jessie Vargas on June 27, 2015, at StubHub Center, California, US on HBO World Championship Boxing to capture the WBO Welterweight Interim title. He won the fight by unanimous decision.

On July 6, the WBO welterweight champion Floyd Mayweather was stripped of his title for failing to pay a $200,000 sanctioning fee for his bout with Manny Pacquiao and for not relinquishing his world titles in the Junior Middleweight division, as the WBO rules mandate that a champion of theirs can only hold titles in one division at a time. Therefore, Bradley was promoted to the full-time WBO welterweight champion.

==== Bradley vs. Ríos ====
ESPN reported on September 8, 2015, that Bradley would make the first defence of his WBO title against 29 year old former WBA lightweight champion Brandon Ríos (33–2–1, 24 KOs) on November 7 at the newly refurbished Thomas & Mack Center in Las Vegas. Bradley also headlined the last card to take place at the Thomas & Mack Center on October 12, 2013. Negotiations were on and off for the fight and nearly broke down completely in August. Due to Sadam Ali being Bradley's mandatory, the WBO stated they would not sanction the fight unless Top Rank made a deal with Ali's promoter Golden Boy, to negotiate a step-aside fee.

Bradley fought and beat former Lightweight champion to retain the WBO Welterweight title. He was trained by his new coach and TV analyst Teddy Atlas. Bradley won the fight by technical knockout in Round 9 at 2:48, after he put Ríos down with a body shot and followed it up with a barrage of punches, dropping Ríos again and prompting referee Tony Weeks to wave off the fight. It was between rounds 7 and 8, that Atlas gave the now famous 'we're firemen' speech emphatically to Bradley; causing an immediate response of motivation from Bradley. Ultimately, the fight ended with an exclamation mark from that speech.

==== Bradley vs. Pacquiao III ====
On December 30, 2015, Bob Arum announced that Manny Pacquiao (57–6–2, 38 KOs) would fight Bradley for the third time in what would be his last professional fight. The fight was set for April 9, 2016, at the MGM Grand Garden Arena in Las Vegas. It was reported that Pacquiao would earn $20 million and Bradley would earn $4 million from the fight. In front of 14,665, Pacquiao knocked Bradley down twice and outpointed him throughout the fight, winning by unanimous decision after all three judges scored the bout 116–110 in his favor. ESPN.com scored it for 117-109 also in favor of Pacquiao. Bradley was down once in round seven and again in round nine. In the post fight Bradley spoke about how patience was the key difference in the fight, "Manny was very strong in there. Very heavy punches. He was also very patient. I wasn't professional enough to stay patient myself, and I walked into shots." CompuBox statistics showed that Pacquiao landed 122 of 439 punches (28%), whereas Bradley connected on 99 of his 302 punches thrown (33%). Many experts, including both fighters called the rubber fight the best of their trilogy. The fight drew 400,000 buys on HBO PPV, generating $24 million. This was considered a low number, as the main event's purses alone equalled $24 million. Pacquiao received a special version of the vacant WBO International title in recognition of his win.

=== Retirement ===
On July 27, 2017, Bradley stated he would announce his retirement. In a statement, referring to his fight against Ruslan Provodnikov, he said, “A few weeks after the fight, I was still affected by the damage that was done. My speech was a little bit off. I was slurring a little bit. But after about two months, I cleared up and I have my wits about me now.” On August 6, 2017, he officially announced his retirement from professional boxing after nearly 12 years in the sport. The announcement came when he posted the following on his Instagram page:

I hope to continue to allow boxing in my world through teaching, commentating and being a fan of a sport I love so dearly. And to you, the diehard fans, man, it's been one heck of a ride. The bumps, the bruises, the peaks, the valleys, the days I didn't want to get out of bed and the nights I couldn't sleep....So many occasions where my heart, mind and soul were tested but with every challenge there was hope and there was all of you...giving me the courage to fight another day and do what I loved to do. I can never find the words to convey how much I appreciate all of you and how truly humbled I am by the unconditional support the past 23 years, Thank you. Thank you for cheering me on when I didn't deserve it, loving me most when I needed it and for being my heartbeat to keep going day after day. I am the man I am today because of you all.

He finished with a record of 33 wins, 2 losses and 1 draw with 13 knockouts in his career.

== Personal life ==
Bradley was born in Palm Springs, California, on August 29, 1983, and grew up in Cathedral City, California. He went to Cathedral City High School, along with future mixed martial artist and former UFC contender Cub Swanson. Prior to becoming a professional boxer, Bradley worked as a dishwasher and as a waiter. He married his high school friend, Monica Manzo, and became an adoptive father to Manzo's two children, all together the couple have five children. In 2015, a Golden Palm Star on the Palm Springs, California, Walk of Stars was dedicated to him.

Bradley was on a vegan diet for his fights from 2008 onwards. He said that he first tried the vegan diet while preparing for his fight against Junior Witter. In this fight, which Bradley won by split decision, Witter was knocked down in 6th from overhand right. After the fight Bradley was proud of the results and maintained his diet. He added that when he was on the vegan diet, he felt superior over any athlete who gets in the ring because it gave him energy, helped with his reflexes and balance. This diet was abandoned prior to the Jessie Vargas fight in 2015.

== Professional boxing record ==
37 fights	33 wins	2 losses
By knockout	13	0
By decision	20	2
Draws	1	
No contests	1	

No.	Result	Record	Opponent	Type	Round, time	Date	Location	Notes
37	Loss	33–2–1 (1)	Manny Pacquiao	UD	12	Apr 9, 2016	MGM Grand Garden Arena, Paradise, Nevada, U.S.	For vacant WBO International welterweight title
36	Win	33–1–1 (1)	Brandon Ríos	TKO	9 (12), 2:48	Nov 7, 2015	Thomas & Mack Center, Paradise, Nevada, U.S.	Retained WBO welterweight title
35	Win	32–1–1 (1)	Jessie Vargas	UD	12	Jun 27, 2015	StubHub Center, Carson, California, U.S.	Won vacant WBO interim welterweight title
34	Draw	31–1–1 (1)	Diego Chaves	SD	12	Dec 13, 2014	Cosmopolitan of Las Vegas, Paradise, Nevada, U.S.	
33	Loss	31–1 (1)	Manny Pacquiao	UD	12	Apr 12, 2014	MGM Grand Garden Arena, Paradise, Nevada, U.S.	Lost WBO welterweight title
32	Win	31–0 (1)	Juan Manuel Márquez	SD	12	Oct 12, 2013	Thomas & Mack Center, Paradise, Nevada, U.S.	Retained WBO welterweight title
31	Win	30–0 (1)	Ruslan Provodnikov	UD	12	Mar 16, 2013	Home Depot Center, Carson, California, U.S.	Retained WBO welterweight title
30	Win	29–0 (1)	Manny Pacquiao	SD	12	Jun 9, 2012	MGM Grand Garden Arena, Paradise, Nevada, U.S.	Won WBO welterweight title
29	Win	28–0 (1)	Joel Casamayor	TKO	8 (12), 2:59	Nov 12, 2011	MGM Grand Garden Arena, Paradise, Nevada, U.S.	Retained WBO light welterweight title
28	Win	27–0 (1)	Devon Alexander	TD	10 (12), 3:00	Jan 29, 2011	Silverdome, Pontiac, Michigan, U.S.	Retained WBO light welterweight title; Won WBC light welterweight title; Unanimous TD: Alexander cut from an accidental head clash
27	Win	26–0 (1)	Luis Abregú	UD	12	Jul 17, 2010	Agua Caliente Casino Resort Spa, Rancho Mirage, California, U.S.	
26	Win	25–0 (1)	Lamont Peterson	UD	12	Dec 12, 2009	Agua Caliente Casino Resort Spa, Rancho Mirage, California, U.S.	Retained WBO light welterweight title
25	NC	24–0 (1)	Nate Campbell	RTD	3 (12), 3:00	Aug 1, 2009	Agua Caliente Casino Resort Spa, Rancho Mirage, California, U.S.	WBO light welterweight title at stake; Originally an RTD win for Bradley, later ruled an NC after an incorrect referee call
24	Win	24–0	Kendall Holt	UD	12	Apr 4, 2009	Bell Centre, Montreal, Quebec, Canada	Retained WBC light welterweight title; Won WBO light welterweight title
23	Win	23–0	Edner Cherry	UD	12	Sep 13, 2008	Beau Rivage, Biloxi, Mississippi, U.S.	Retained WBC light welterweight title
22	Win	22–0	Junior Witter	SD	12	May 10, 2008	Nottingham Arena, Nottingham, England	Won WBC light welterweight title
21	Win	21–0	Miguel Vázquez	UD	10	Jul 27, 2007	Omega Products International, Corona, California, U.S.	Won vacant WBC Youth light welterweight title
20	Win	20–0	Donald Camarena	UD	10	Jun 1, 2007	Chumash Casino Resort, Santa Ynez, California, U.S.	
19	Win	19–0	Nasser Athumani	TKO	5 (10), 1:35	Apr 13, 2007	DoubleTree, Ontario, California, U.S.	
18	Win	18–0	Manuel Garnica	UD	8	Feb 2, 2007	Chumash Casino Resort, Santa Ynez, California, U.S.	Won vacant WBC Youth light welterweight title
17	Win	17–0	Jaime Rangel	TD	8 (8), 1:54	Dec 1, 2006	Chumash Casino Resort, Santa Ynez, California, U.S.	Unanimous TD: Rangel cut from an accidental head clash
16	Win	16–0	Alfonso Sanchez	KO	1 (8), 2:44	Oct 16, 2006	DoubleTree, Ontario, California, U.S.	
15	Win	15–0	Martin Ramirez	RTD	5 (8), 3:00	Aug 18, 2006	Omega Products International, Corona, California, U.S.	
14	Win	14–0	Arturo Urena	TKO	3 (10), 0:27	Jun 23, 2006	DoubleTree, Ontario, California, U.S.	Won vacant WBC Youth light welterweight title
13	Win	13–0	Jesus Abel Santiago	KO	6 (8)	May 13, 2006	Antelope Valley Fairgrounds, Lancaster, California, U.S.	
12	Win	12–0	Eli Addison	UD	8	Mar 31, 2006	DoubleTree, Ontario, California, U.S.	Retained WBC Youth welterweight title
11	Win	11–0	Rafael Ortiz	RTD	2 (10), 3:00	Feb 17, 2006	DoubleTree, Ontario, California, U.S.	Retained WBC Youth welterweight title
10	Win	10–0	Jorge Alberto Padilla	TD	9 (10), 3:00	Nov 21, 2005	DoubleTree, Ontario, California, U.S.	Unanimous TD: Padilla cut from an accidental head clash
9	Win	9–0	Francisco Rincon	UD	10	Sep 23, 2005	Omega Products International, Corona, California, U.S.	Won vacant WBC Youth welterweight title
8	Win	8–0	Juan Yoani Cervantes	UD	6	Aug 26, 2005	Omega Products International, Corona, California, U.S.	
7	Win	7–0	Marcos Andre Rocha Costa	KO	5 (6), 2:15	Jul 21, 2005	Athletic Club, Los Angeles, California, U.S.	
6	Win	6–0	Justo Almazan	UD	6	Jun 3, 2005	DoubleTree, Ontario, California, U.S.	
5	Win	5–0	Ramon Ortiz	TKO	3 (6), 2:49	Apr 25, 2005	DoubleTree, Ontario, California, U.S.	
4	Win	4–0	Carlos Parra	RTD	1 (4), 1:59	Mar 28, 2005	DoubleTree, Ontario, California, U.S.	
3	Win	3–0	Luis Medina	KO	1 (4), 0:18	Nov 22, 2004	DoubleTree, Ontario, California, U.S.	
2	Win	2–0	Raul Nunez	UD	4	Oct 29, 2004	DoubleTree, Ontario, California, U.S.	
1	Win	1–0	Francisco Martinez	TKO	2 (4), 1:17	Aug 20, 2004	Omega Products International, Corona, California, U.S.	

== Titles in boxing ==
=== Major world titles ===
- WBC light welterweight champion (140 lbs) (2×)
- WBO light welterweight champion (140 lbs)
- WBO welterweight champion (147 lbs) (2×)

=== Interim world titles ===
- WBO interim welterweight champion (147 lbs)

=== Minor world titles ===
- WBC Youth light welterweight champion (140 lbs) (3×)
- WBC Youth welterweight champion (147 lbs)

=== Honorary titles ===
- WBO Super Champion

== Pay-per-view bouts ==
Date	Fight	Billing	Buys	Network
June 9, 2012	Pacquiao vs. Bradley	Perfect Storm	890,000	HBO
October 12, 2013	Bradley vs. Márquez	The Conquerors	375,000	HBO
April 12, 2014	Pacquiao vs. Bradley II	Vindication	800,000	HBO
April 9, 2016	Pacquiao vs. Bradley III	The Legacy Fight	400,000	HBO

Sporting positions
Regional boxing titles
Vacant Title last held by Michael Santos	WBC Youth welterweight champion September 23, 2005 – May 2006; Vacated	Vacant Title next held by Devon Alexander
Vacant Title last held by Julio Cesar Garcia	WBC Youth light welterweight champion June 23, 2006 – August 2006; Vacated	Vacant Title next held by Pavel Miranda
Vacant Title last held by Pavel Miranda	WBC Youth light welterweight champion February 2, 2007 – March 2007; Vacated	Vacant Title next held by Ali Chebah
Vacant Title last held by Marvin Cordova Jr.	WBC Youth light welterweight champion July 27, 2007 – October 2007; Vacated	Vacant Title next held by Ali Chebah
World boxing titles
Preceded by Junior Witter	WBC light welterweight champion May 10, 2008 – April 28, 2009; Stripped	Vacant Title next held by Devon Alexander
Preceded by Kendall Holt	WBO light welterweight champion April 4, 2009 – June 27, 2012; Vacated	Succeeded by Juan Manuel Márquez
Preceded by Devon Alexander	WBC light welterweight champion January 29, 2011 – July 28, 2011; Status changed	Vacant Title next held by Érik Morales
Preceded by Manny Pacquiao	WBO welterweight champion June 9, 2012 – April 12, 2014	Succeeded by Manny Pacquiao
Vacant Title last held by Kermit Cintrón	WBO welterweight champion Interim title June 27, 2015 – July 6, 2015; Promoted	Vacant Title next held by Brian Norman Jr.
Preceded by Floyd Mayweather Jr. stripped	WBO welterweight champion July 6, 2015 – February 9, 2016; Vacated	Vacant Title next held by Jessie Vargas
Honorary boxing titles
New title	WBC light welterweight champion In recess July 28, 2011 – November 2011; Vacated	Vacant Title next held by Devin Haney
Awards
Preceded by Juan Manuel Márquez vs. Manny Pacquiao IV	The Ring Fight of the Year vs. Ruslan Provodnikov; 2013	Succeeded by Lucas Matthysse vs. John Molina Jr.
Preceded by Juan Manuel Márquez vs. Manny Pacquiao IV	BWAA Fight of the Year vs. Ruslan Provodnikov; 2013	Succeeded by Lucas Matthysse vs. John Molina Jr.
Preceded by Juan Manuel Márquez vs. Manny Pacquiao IV	ESPN Fight of the Year vs. Ruslan Provodnikov; 2013	Next: Francisco Rodríguez Jr. vs. Katsunari Takayama
