= Luis Abregú =

Argentine boxer

Luis Carlos Abregu
Personal information
- Nickname: El Potro
- Born: Luis Carlos Abregu; 15 December 1982 (age 43) Chicligasta, Tucuman, Argentina
- Height: 5 ft 10 in (1.78 m)
- Weight: Welterweight

Boxing career
- Stance: Orthodox

Boxing record
- Total fights: 39
- Wins: 36
- Win by KO: 29
- Losses: 3
- Draws: 0
- No contests: 0

Luis Carlos Abregu (born 15 December 1982) is an Argentine former professional boxer who competed from 2005 to 2016.

== Professional career ==
Abregu made his professional debut on 4 March 2005, defeating fellow Argentine Alberto Evaristo Torres via third-round technical knockout. Abregu built up a record of 19–0, all fought in his native Argentina, before fighting overseas for the first time as he travelled to the United States to beat Christian Solano.

His first loss came at the hands of Timothy Bradley. Bradley, who moved up from light welterweight, won the match on a unanimous decision on July 17, 2010, at the Agua Caliente Casino in Rancho Mirage, California.

== Professional boxing record ==
36 Wins (29 knockouts), 3 Losses (2 knockout)
Res.	Record	Opponent	Type	Round Time	Date	Location	Notes
Loss	36–3	(Argentina) Juan Carlos Pedrozo	TKO	3 (8)	2016-09-23	Complejo Deportivo Nicolás Vitale, Salta, Argentina	
Loss	36–2	(United States) Sadam Ali	TKO	9 (10)	Nov 8, 2014	(United States) Boardwalk Hall, Atlantic City, New Jersey	For WBO Inter-Continental welterweight title
Win	36–1	(Venezuela) Jean Carlos Prada	TKO	8 (10)	2014–04–04	(Argentina) Estadio Delmi, Salta	
Win	35–1	(Canada) Antonin Décarie	UD	10 (10)	2013–04–27	(Argentina) Estadio José Amalfitani, Buenos Aires	Won vacant WBC Silver welterweight title
Win	34–1	(Puerto Rico) Thomas Dulorme	TKO	7 (10); 2:35	2012–10–27	(United States) Turning Stone Resort & Casino, Verona, New York	Won vacant WBC International welterweight title
Win	33–1	(Venezuela) Marco Avendano	KO	3 (12)	2012–09–07	(Argentina) Estadio Delmi, Salta	Retained South American welterweight title
Win	32–1	(Venezuela) Pedro Verdu	KO	5 (12)	2012–06–08	(Argentina) Estadio Delmi, Salta	Won vacant South American welterweight title
Win	31–1	(Argentina) Javier Mamani	KO	2 (10)	2011–11–04	(Argentina) Estadio Delmi, Salta	
Win	30–1	(Argentina) Walter Diaz	TKO	2 (8)	2011–08–12	(Argentina) Estadio Delmi, Salta	
Loss	29–1	(United States) Timothy Bradley	UD	12	2010–07–17	(United States) Agua Caliente Casino, Rancho Mirage, California	
Win	29–0	(Colombia) Richard Gutierrez	UD	10	2010–02–06	(Mexico) Monterrey Arena, Monterrey	Won vacant WBC FECARBOX welterweight title
Win	28–0	(Argentina) Diego Diaz Gallardo	KO	4 (10)	2009–09–04	(Argentina) Estadio Delmi, Salta	
Win	27–0	(Puerto Rico) Irving Garcia	KO	4 (10); 2:59	2009–05–01	(United States) Chumash Casino, Santa Ynez, California	
Win	26–0	(Argentina) Americo Sagania	UD	10	2009–03–20	(Argentina) Estadio Delmi, Salta	
Win	25–0	(United States) David Estrada	SD	10	2008–12–05	(United States) Chumash Casino, Santa Ynez, California	
Win	24–0	(Mexico) Roberto Valenzuela	TKO	6; 0:51	2008–10–04	(United States) Pechanga Resort and Casino, Temecula, California	
Win	23–0	(United States) Thomas Davis	TKO	2 (10); 0:58	2008–07–30	(United States) Sycuan Resort & Casino, El Cajon, California	
Win	22–0	(Argentina) Roberto Reuque	KO	3 (12); 0:35	2008–07–04	(Argentina) Estadio Delmi, Salta	Retained South American welterweight title
Win	21–0	(Argentina) Raúl Bejarano	TKO	7 (12)	2008–04–04	(Argentina) Estadio Delmi, Salta	Won South American welterweight title
Win	20–0	(Mexico) Cristian Solano	TKO	3 (8); 1:18	2007–10–20	(United States) Sycuan Resort & Casino, El Cajon, California	
Win	19–0	(Argentina) Julio Gonzalez	RTD	3 (6)	2007–08–10	(Argentina) Estadio Delmi, Salta	
Win	18–0	(Argentina) Amilcar Funez Melian	KO	9 (10); 1:23	2007–06–08	(Argentina) Estadio Delmi, Salta	
Win	17–0	(Argentina) Luis Sosa	RTD	2 (6); 0:01	2006–03–10	(Argentina) Club Echagüe, Paraná	
Win	16–0	(Argentina) Sergio Finetto	TKO	5 (8); 1:56	2006–10–28	(Argentina) Club Sportivo America, Santa Fe	
Win	15–0	(Uruguay) Rodrigo Pias	RTD	6 (10); 0:01	2006–09–09	(Argentina) Club Yupanqui, Buenos Aires	
Win	14–0	(Argentina) Cristian Paz	RTD	1 (6); 2:11	2006–08–12	(Argentina) Ce. De. M. No. 2, Caseros	
Win	13–0	(Paraguay) Jorge Gomez	TKO	4 (8)	2006–06–22	(Argentina) Salta	
Win	12–0	(Argentina) Raul Lopez	KO	2 (6)	2006–05–05	(Argentina) Cachi	
Win	11–0	(Argentina) Sergio Benitez	TKO	4 (6); 2:23	2006–04–22	(Argentina) Luna Park, Buenos Aires	
Win	10–0	(Argentina) Dario Perez	KO	3 (4); 1:32	2006–02–25	(Argentina) Estadio F. A. B., Buenos Aires	
Win	9–0	(Argentina) Daniel Montenegro	TKO	2 (6); 1:14	2005–12–10	(Argentina) Estadio F. A. B., Buenos Aires	
Win	8–0	(Argentina) Ivan Taberna	TKO	2 (6); 1:19	2005–11–26	(Argentina) Estadio F. A. B., Buenos Aires	
Win	7–0	(Argentina) Walter Gomez	UD	6	2005–09–10	(Argentina) Estadio Delmi, Salta	
Win	6–0	(Argentina) Nestor Sanchez	DQ	1 (6)	2005–08–05	(Argentina) Joaquín V. González	
Win	5–0	(Argentina) Jorge Ramirez	KO	1 (4)	2005–07–02	(Argentina) Club Prado Español, Laboulaye	
Win	4–0	(Argentina) Bernardino Gonzalez	TKO	8; 1:00	2005–06–10	(Argentina) Estadio Delmi, Salta	
Win	3–0	(Argentina) Fernando Pereyra	MD	4	2005–04–16	(Argentina) Estadio Delmi, Salta	
Win	2–0	(Argentina) Sergio De Oliveira	KO	1 (4); 0:25	2005–04–01	(Argentina) Ex Salta Club, Salta	
Win	1–0	(Argentina) Alberto Torres	TKO	3 (4)	2005–03–04	(Argentina) Salta	
