= Irving Garcia (boxer) =

Puerto Rican boxer

Personal information
- Nickname: Chuma
- Nationality: Puerto Rican
- Born: Irving Jose Garcia; 29 January 1979 (age 47) Vega Baja, Puerto Rico
- Height: 1.73 m (5 ft 8 in)
- Weight: Welterweight; Super welterweight

Boxing career
- Reach: 183 cm (72 in)
- Stance: Orthodox

Boxing record
- Total fights: 29
- Wins: 17
- Win by KO: 8
- Losses: 8
- Draws: 3
- No contests: 1

Irving Jose Garcia (born 29 January 1979) is a Puerto Rican former professional boxer who competed from 1998 to 2012. He challenged for the WBA welterweight interim title in 2008 and won two regional WBC titles at the same weight.

== Professional career ==
Garcia faced WBA welterweight interim champion Yuriy Nuzhnenko on April 19, 2008, at the Kyiv Sports Palace in Ukraine. The bout ended in a technical draw after ten rounds due to Nuzhnenko sustaining a cut from an accidental clash of heads. One judge scored the bout 96–95 in favour of Garcia, and the other scored it a 95–95 draw, so Nuzhnenko retained the title.

== Professional boxing record ==
29 fights	17 wins	8 losses
By knockout	8	3
By decision	8	5
By disqualification	1	0
Draws	3	
No contests	1	

No.	Result	Record	Opponent	Type	Round, time	Date	Location	Notes
29	NC	17–8–3 (1)	Wale Omotoso	NC	2 (10), 3:00	7 Dec 2012	Texas Station Casino, North Las Vegas, Nevada, U.S.	NC after Garcia was cut from an accidental head clash
28	Loss	17–8–3	Ishe Smith	UD	10	8 Sep 2012	Hard Rock Hotel and Casino, Paradise, Nevada, U.S.	
27	Loss	17–7–3	Kenny Galarza	SD	10	10 Jun 2011	Roseland Ballroom, New York City, New York, U.S.	
26	Loss	17–6–3	Antonin Décarie	MD	10	29 Oct 2010	Bell Centre, Montreal, Quebec, Canada	
25	Loss	17–5–3	Mike Jones	KO	5 (12), 1:22	9 Jul 2010	Boardwalk Hall, Atlantic City, New Jersey, U.S.	For WBA–NABA and WBO–NABO welterweight titles
24	Loss	17–4–3	Luis Carlos Abregu	KO	4 (10), 2:59	1 May 2009	Chumash Casino, Santa Ynez, California, U.S.	
23	Win	17–3–3	Chris Smith	UD	10	17 Oct 2008	Coliseum Francisco Deyda, Hatillo, Puerto Rico	
22	Draw	16–3–3	Hector Munoz	TD	2 (10), 1:40	22 Aug 2008	Hilton Hotel, Ponce, Puerto Rico	TD after Munoz was cut from a punch by Garcia
21	Draw	16–3–2	Yuriy Nuzhnenko	TD	10 (12), 3:00	19 Apr 2008	Sports Palace, Kyiv, Ukraine	For WBA interim welterweight title; Majority TD after Nuzhnenko was cut from an accidental head clash
20	Win	16–3–1	Sergio Garcia	TD	8 (10)	14 Mar 2008	A La Carte Event Pavilion, Tampa, Florida, U.S.	
19	Win	15–3–1	Carlos Pena	TKO	5 (8), 2:39	27 Oct 2007	Coliseo Angel 'Cholo' Espada, Salinas, Puerto Rico	
18	Loss	14–3–1	Said Ouali	TKO	2 (10), 1:44	23 Mar 2007	Foxwoods Resort, Ledyard, Connecticut, U.S.	
17	Draw	14–2–1	Jose Antonio Ojeda	TD	3 (10), 1:55	1 Dec 2006	Chumash Casino, Santa Ynez, California, U.S.	
16	Win	14–2	Michael Santos	UD	8	6 Oct 2006	Chumash Casino, Santa Ynez, California, U.S.	
15	Win	13–2	Roberto Ortega	TKO	1 (12), 2:55	23 Jun 2006	A La Carte Event Pavilion, Tampa, Florida, U.S.	Won vacant WBC Latino welterweight title
14	Win	12–2	Steve Valdez	TKO	9 (10), 0:55	3 Mar 2006	A La Carte Event Pavilion, Tampa, Florida, U.S.	Won vacant WBC Latino welterweight title
13	Win	11–2	Jerome Ellis	UD	6	7 Oct 2005	A La Carte Event Pavilion, Tampa, Florida, U.S.	
12	Win	10–2	Frankie Santos	UD	12	7 May 2005	Coliseo Roger L. Mendoza, Caguas, Puerto Rico	Won vacant WBC-CABOFE welterweight title
11	Loss	9–2	George Armenta	UD	8	1 Jul 2004	Palace Indian Gaming Center, Lemoore, California, U.S.	
10	Loss	9–1	Julio Garcia	SD	10	21 Feb 2003	Miccosukee Indian Gaming Resort, Miami, Florida, U.S.	
9	Win	9–0	Tyrone Ivory	KO	2 (6), 0:47	5 Oct 2002	Cobo Hall, Detroit, Michigan, U.S.	
8	Win	8–0	Norberto Sandoval	UD	6	18 May 2002	Mandalay Bay Resort & Casino, Paradise, Nevada, U.S.	
7	Win	7–0	Angel David Gonzalez	DQ	9 (12)	22 Dec 2001	Acropolis, Manatí, Puerto Rico	Retained Puerto Rican super welterweight title
6	Win	6–0	Melvin Cardona	TKO	9 (12)	17 Aug 2001	Hatillo, Puerto Rico	Won vacant Puerto Rican super welterweight title
5	Win	5–0	Andres Larrinaga	TKO	2	7 Jul 2001	Barceloneta, Puerto Rico	
4	Win	4–0	Giovanni Plaza	TKO	1	25 Jul 1999	Ponce, Puerto Rico	
3	Win	3–0	Nelson Solano	KO	2	26 Mar 1999	Vega Baja, Puerto Rico	
2	Win	2–0	Alfredo Cruz	PTS	4	11 Nov 1998	Vega Baja, Puerto Rico	
1	Win	1–0	Alfredo Cruz	PTS	4	23 Jul 1998	Coliseo Moises Navedo, Vega Baja, Puerto Rico	Professional debut

Sporting positions
Regional boxing titles
Vacant Title last held by Luis Felipe Perez	Puerto Rican super welterweight champion 17 Aug 2001 – Aug 2002; Vacated	Title discontinued
Vacant Title last held by Edwin Vazquez	WBC–CABOFE welterweight champion 7 May 2005 – Jul 2005; Vacated	Vacant Title next held by Roberto García
New title	WBC Latino welterweight champion 3 Mar 2006 – May 2006; Vacated	Vacant Title next held by Himself
Vacant Title last held by Himself	WBC Latino welterweight champion 23 Jun 2006 – Jun 2006; Vacated	Vacant Title next held by Carlos Quintana
