= Manny Pacquiao vs. Timothy Bradley II =

Boxing match

Vindication
- Date: April 12, 2014
- Venue: MGM Grand Garden Arena, Paradise, Nevada, U.S.
- Title on the line: WBO welterweight title

Tale of the tape
Boxer	Timothy Bradley	Manny Pacquiao
Nickname	Desert Storm	Pac-Man
Hometown	Palm Springs, California, U.S.	General Santos, Philippines
Purse	$6,000,000	$20,000,000
Pre-fight record	31–0 (1) (12 KO)	55–5–2 (38 KO)
Age	30 years, 7 months	35 years, 3 months
Height	5 ft 6 in (168 cm)	5 ft 6 in (168 cm)
Weight	145 1/2 lb (66 kg)	145 lb (66 kg)
Style	Orthodox	Southpaw
Recognition	WBO; Welterweight Champion; The Ring; No. 1 Ranked Welterweight; TBRB; No. 2 Ranked Welterweight; The Ring No. 3 ranked pound-for-pound fighter 2-division world champion	WBO; No. 1 Ranked Welterweight; The Ring; No. 3 Ranked Welterweight; TBRB; No. 4 Ranked Welterweight; The Ring No. 7 ranked pound-for-pound fighter 8-division world champion

Result
- Pacquiao wins via 12-round unanimous decision (116-112, 116-112, 118-110)

Timothy Bradley vs. Manny Pacquiao II, billed as Vindication, was a professional boxing match contested on April 12, 2014, for the WBO welterweight championship.

== Background ==
The bout was held at the MGM Grand Garden Arena in Paradise, Nevada. Bradley entered as a 2 to 1 betting underdog.

== The fight ==
Pacquiao won by unanimous decision and took the WBO welterweight title, ending Bradley's undefeated streak.

ESPN's Dan Rafael scored the bout 118-110 and HBO's Harold Lederman had it 116-112 both for Pacquiao.

== National anthem singers ==
National anthem singers

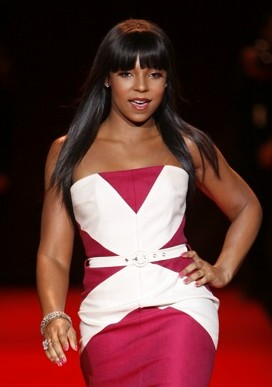
Ashanti
The Star-Spangled Banner

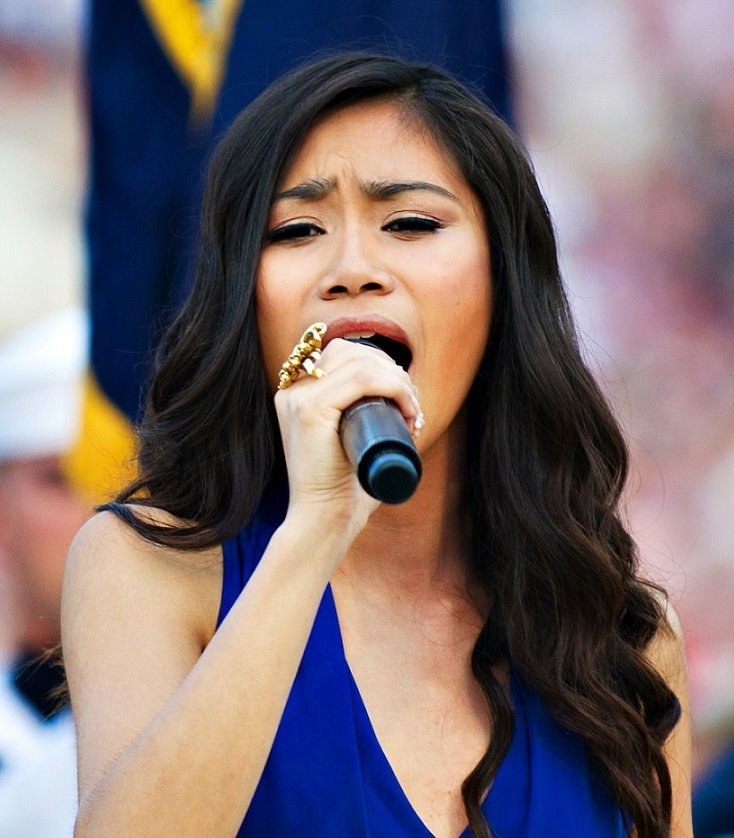
Jessica Sanchez Lupang Hinirang

- United States (The Star-Spangled Banner): Ashanti
- Philippines (Lupang Hinirang): Jessica Sanchez

== Fight card ==
Confirmed bouts:

=== Main bouts (HBO PPV) ===
- WBO welterweight bout: (Philippines) Manny Pacquiao vs. (United States) Timothy Bradley (c)
  - Pacquiao won by unanimous decision.
- NABO lightweight bout: (Mexico) Raymundo Beltrán VS. (Canada) Arash Usmanee
  - Beltrán won by unanimous decision.
- WBA/IBO light welterweight bout: (Russia) Khabib Allakhverdiev (c) vs. (United States) Jessie Vargas
  - Vargas won by unanimous decision.
- WBA super featherweight bout: (Costa Rica) Bryan Vázquez (c) vs. (Mexico) Jose Félix Jr.
  - Vázquez won by unanimous decision.

=== Preliminary bouts (TopRank.tv) ===
- Light heavyweight bout: (Ukraine) Oleksandr Hvozdyk vs. (United States) Mike Montoya
  - Hvozdyk won by TKO.
- Featherweight bout: (Mexico) Óscar Valdez vs. (Mexico) Adrian Perez
  - Valdez won by TKO.
- Super middleweight bout: (Brazil) Esquiva Falcão vs. (United States) Publio Pena
  - Falcao won by unanimous decision.
- Light heavyweight bout: (United States) Sean Monaghan vs. (United States) Joe McCreedy
  - Monaghan won by TKO.

== Broadcasting ==
In the United States, the fight was broadcast on pay-per-view through HBO Boxing using Top Rank graphics and online at TopRank.tv. The fights were commentated by Jim Lampley, Max Kellerman and Mario Lopez as special guest commentator.

Unlike in the first fight drawing 890,000 PPV buys, the second fight drew around 800,000 PPV buys based on ESPN's report. Other sources would estimate between 775,000 and 800,000 PPV buys.

=== International broadcasting ===
The broadcasts for viewers outside the United States were under the Top Rank banner and commentated by the HBO Boxing crew for the English broadcast.

Country	Broadcaster		
Country	Free-to-air	Cable	Pay-per-view
Australia	—N/a	Fox Sports	Main Event
Canada	—N/a	Fight Network	—N/a
Chile	—N/a	Golden, Vive Deportes	—N/a
Indonesia	tvOne	—N/a	—N/a
New Zealand	—N/a	—N/a	SKY Arena
Philippines	GMA Network	Solar Sports	Solar All Access
Thailand	Channel 7	Media Channel	—N/a
United Kingdom	—N/a	—N/a	BoxNation
United States	—N/a	—N/a	HBO PPV

Preceded by vs. Brandon Ríos	Manny Pacquiao's bouts 12 April 2014	Succeeded by vs. Chris Algieri
Preceded by vs. Juan Manuel Márquez	Timothy Bradley's bouts 12 April 2014	Succeeded by vs. Diego Chaves
