= C. J. Ross =

Boxing judge

C.J. Ross is a retired professional boxing judge.

== Manny Pacquiao vs. Timothy Bradley ==
As a judge for the Manny Pacquiao vs. Timothy Bradley fight, Ross scored the bout for Bradley, 115–113. Her scorecard drew heavy criticism, since the other two judges split their respective scorecards, making the result a split decision in favor of Bradley.

== Floyd Mayweather vs. Canelo Álvarez ==
As a judge for the Floyd Mayweather Jr. vs. Canelo Álvarez fight, Ross scored the bout a draw, 114–114. Her scorecard again drew heavy criticism and changed the outcome of the scoring from a unanimous decision to a majority decision. However, unlike the Pacquiao–Bradley fight, her scorecard did not change the win/loss upshot.

== Retirement ==
After the Mayweather–Álvarez fight, Ross stepped down as a boxing judge.
