= Agua Caliente Casino Resort Spa =

Casino resort in Rancho Mirage, California

Coordinates: 33.814°N 116.408°W

- Agua Caliente Casino Logo from 2009–2019

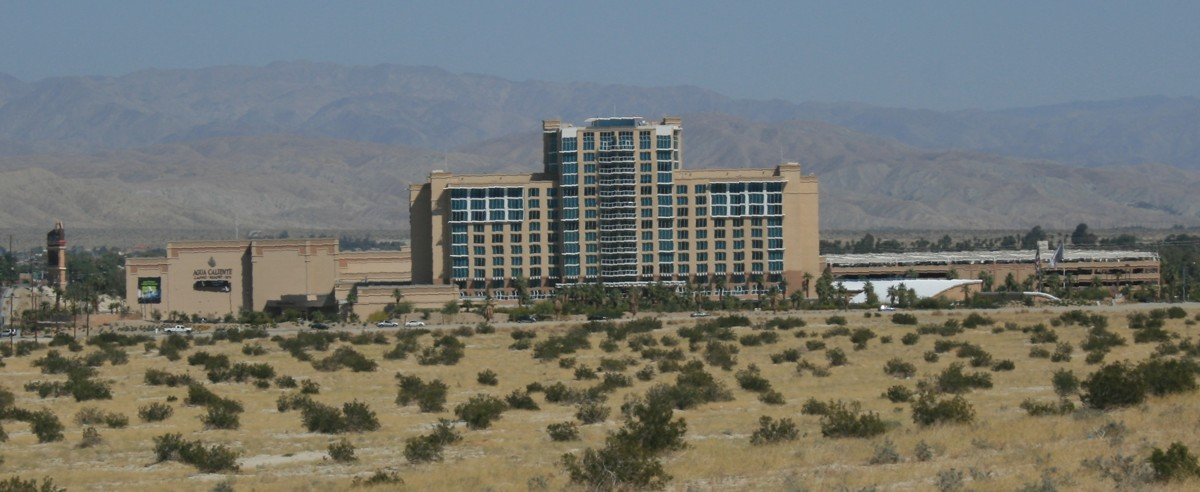
- Interactive map of Agua Caliente
- Location: 32-250 Bob Hope Drive Rancho Mirage, CA 92270
- Opened: April 6, 2001
- Theme: Modern
- No. of rooms: 340
- Gaming space: 45,000 sq ft (4,200 m^{2})
- Permanent shows: The Show
- Notable restaurants: The Steakhouse, Waters Cafe, 360 Sports, Java Caliente, and The District Food Court with options ranging from pizza, to BLTs, or Beijing Beef to tacos and Mexican Torta.
- Casino type: Land-based
- Owner: Agua Caliente Band of Cahuilla Indians
- Renovated in: 2007
- Website: Casino Website

The Agua Caliente Casino is a gambling facility, run by the Agua Caliente Band of Cahuilla Indians, in Rancho Mirage, California. The facility has over 45,000 square feet (4,200 m^{2}) of gambling floor. The casino completed a 16-story, 173-foot (53 m) hotel tower which opened on April 18, 2008. The tower is the third-tallest building in the Inland Empire.

The paved and landscaped parking lot on the property was, nearly 40 years before, a sandy patch of desert, across which Jonathan Winters drove a moving van, in the film It's a Mad, Mad, Mad, Mad World.

The Agua Caliente Band also runs the ‘’’Spa Resort and Casino’’’ in nearby Palm Springs, California, which became Agua Caliente Casino Palm Springs in 2019.

== History ==
On March 14, 2000, the band announced plans for the $80-million Agua Caliente Casino.

The Agua Caliente Casino opened on April 6, 2001.

== See also ==
- List of casinos in California
