= Solar All Access =

Pay-per-view television channel in the Philippines

- Network: Pay-per-view

Ownership
- Owner: Solar Entertainment Corporation
- Sister channels: SolarFlix (formerly ETC); Shop TV; Solar Sports; Jack TV (defunct); Basketball TV (defunct); NBA Premium TV (defunct); 2nd Avenue (defunct); Front Row Channel; Solar Learning

History
- Launched: 2002
- Former names: Solar Sports PPV (2002–2006)

Solar All Access (formerly known as Solar Sports PPV) is a Philippines and Asian non-commercial pay-per-view sports subscription service of Solar Entertainment Corporation which features live sports broadcasts via satellite. Launched in 2002, it includes the boxing matches of Manny Pacquiao, yearly soccer matches of FIFA World Cup, the Olympics competitions and wrestling matches of WWE, specially on Pay-Per-Views. It is available on SkyCable channel 99 (SD), 195 (HD) and Cignal channel 199 (SD), and 299 (HD). PPV viewing is also available to the public in gymnasiums, cinemas, restaurants, bars and hotels in the Philippines.

== See also ==
- Solar Entertainment Corporation
- Kapamilya Box Office
