= Jesús Rojas (Puerto Rican boxer) =

Puerto Rican boxer

Jesus Rojas
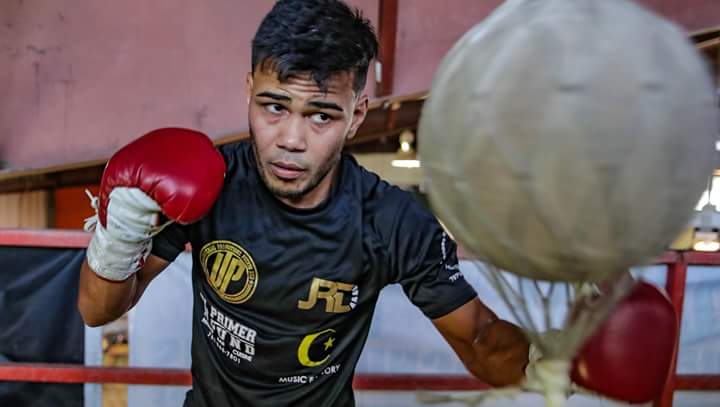

Personal information
- Nationality: Puerto Rican
- Born: Jesus Manuel Rojas Diaz; December 26, 1986 (age 39) Caguas, Puerto Rico
- Height: 5 ft 7 in (170 cm)
- Weight: Super bantamweight; Featherweight

Boxing career
- Reach: 68 in (173 cm)
- Stance: Orthodox

Boxing record
- Total fights: 33
- Wins: 27
- Win by KO: 20
- Losses: 3
- Draws: 2
- No contests: 1

Jesus Manuel Rojas Diaz (born December 26, 1986, in Caguas, Puerto Rico) is a Puerto Rican boxer who is the former WBA (Regular) featherweight champion.

== Professional career ==
After turning professional in 2006 Rojas amassed a record of 25–1–2–1 in 11 years before challenging and beating Dominican Claudio Marrero for the interim WBA featherweight title.

In July 2018 the World Boxing Association announced that Rojas was upgraded to 'Regular champion' and that he will be making his first defense against Mexican American boxer Joseph Diaz. Diaz however, came into the fight overweight, missing the required weight limit by 0.6 pounds. According to WBA rules, this meant that Rojas got to keep his title regardless of the outcome of the fight. Diaz thus suffered his first defeat in 10 years, by a 12-round unanimous decision.

In a fight deemed an early "fight of the year" candidate, Rojas defended his WBA title against Chinese star and WBA #2 at featherweight Can Xu. Xu edged out Rojas in a highly controversial unanimous decision. The official scorecards, 118–110, 117–111, and 116–112 were in wide favor of Xu, even though the punch output from Rojas suggested that the fight was much closer than that.

== Professional boxing record ==
33 fights	27 wins	3 losses
By knockout	20	0
By decision	7	3
Draws	2	
No contests	1	

No.	Result	Record	Opponent	Type	Round, time	Date	Location	Notes
33	Win	27–3–2 (1)	(Mexico) Luis Castillo Leal	TKO	4 (10)	05–18–2019	(Puerto Rico) Coliseo Roger L. Mendoza, Caguas	
32	Loss	26–3–2 (1)	(China) Xu Can	UD	12 (12)	01–26–2019	(United States) Toyota Center, Houston	Lost WBA (Regular) featherweight title
31	Loss	26–2–2 (1)	(United States) Joseph Diaz	UD	12 (12)	08–11–2018	(United States) Avalon Hollywood, Los Angeles	
30	Win	26–1–2 (1)	(Dominican Republic) Claudio Marrero	KO	7 (12)	09-15–2017	(United States) MGM Grand Marquee Ballroom, Las Vegas	Won WBA interim featherweight title
29	Win	25–1–2 (1)	(United States) Abraham Lopez	TKO	8 (10)	05–05–2017	(United States) MGM Grand Garden Arena, Las Vegas	Won NABA featherweight title
28	Win	24–1–2 (1)	(Mexico) Jesus A Valdez	TKO	5 (10)	09-17–2016	(Puerto Rico) Coliseo Héctor Solá Bezares, Caguas	Won vacant WBA Fedecaribe featherweight title
27	Win	23–1–2 (1)	(United States) Kiun Evans	KO	1 (10)	03-19–2016	(Puerto Rico) Mario Morales Coliseum, Guaynabo	
26	Draw	22–1–2 (1)	(Mexico) Jorge Lara	TD	6 (10)	09–08–2015	(United States) Hollywood Palladium, Los Angeles	
25	Win	22–1–1 (1)	(Puerto Rico) Braulio Santos	UD	8 (8)	05-16–2015	(Puerto Rico) Coliseo Pedrin Zorilla, San Juan	
24	Win	21–1–1 (1)	(Mexico) Jose Angel Beranza	UD	10 (10)	08–30-2014	(Puerto Rico) Auditorio Juan Pachín Vicéns, Ponce	
23	Win	20–1–1 (1)	(Dominican Republic) Juan Carlos Pena	TKO	6 (9)	06-28–2014	(Dominican Republic) Sheraton Hotel, Santo Domingo	Won WBA Fedecentro super-bantamweight title
22	Win	19–1–1 (1)	(Mexico) Juan Jose Beltran	KO	1 (6)	03-22–2014	(Puerto Rico) Auditorio Juan Pachín Vicéns, Ponce	
21	NC	18–1–1 (1)	(Mexico) Jorge Arce	NC	2 (10)	06-09–2012	(United States) MGM Grand Garden Arena, Las Vegas	
20	Draw	18–1–1	(Mexico) Jose Luis Araiza	MD	8 (8)	01-07–2012	(United States) Diplomat Resort & Spa, Hollywood	
19	Win	18–1	(Dominican Republic) Miguelo Tavarez	TKO	2 (6)	08-06–2011	(Dominican Republic) Parque del Este, Santo Domingo	
18	Win	17–1	(United States) Isaac Hidalgo	UD	6 (6)	03-12–2011	(United States) MGM Grand Garden Arena, Las Vegas	
17	Win	16–1	(Colombia) Reynaldo Lopez	SD	6 (6)	11-05–2010	(Puerto Rico) Coliseo Cosme Beitia Salamo, Catano	
16	Win	15–1	(Puerto Rico) Luis Angel Paneto	KO	1 (6)	08-28–2010	(Puerto Rico) Coliseo Ruben Viera, Las Piedras	
15	Win	14–1	(The Bahamas) Richard Pitt	KO	2 (6)	06-04–2010	(Puerto Rico) Coliseo Rafael G Amalbert, Juncos	
14	Loss	13–1	(Mexico) Jose Angel Beranza	UD	8 (8)	12-06–2008	(United States) MGM Grand Garden Arena, Las Vegas	
13	Win	13–0	(Ghana) Anyetei Laryea	UD	8 (8)	07-26–2008	(United States) MGM Grand Garden Arena, Las Vegas	
12	Win	12–0	(Ghana) Alex Baba	TKO	6 (8)	06-28–2008	(United States) Mandalay Bay Events Center, Las Vegas	
11	Win	11–0	(Colombia) Andres Ledesma	TKO	4 (8)	04–12–2008	(United States) Boardwalk Hall, Atlantic City	
10	Win	10–0	(Puerto Rico) Carlos Diaz	TKO	6 (6)	11-10–2007	(United States) Madison Square Garden, New York	
9	Win	9–0	(United States) Baladan Trevizo	TKO	4 (6)	08-25–2007	(Puerto Rico) Coliseo Rubén Rodríguez, Bayamon	
8	Win	8–0	(United States) Torrence Daniels	UD	6 (6)	Jun 9, 2007	(United States) Madison Square Garden, New York	
7	Win	7–0	(Barbados) Ricardo Blackman	KO	1 (6)	Nov 10, 2007	(Puerto Rico) Coliseo Angel 'Cholo' Espada, Salinas	
6	Win	6–0	(Mexico) Enrique Quevedo	UD	6 (6)	03–03–2007	(Puerto Rico) Roberto Clemente Coliseum, San Juan	
5	Win	5–0	(Puerto Rico) Ubaldo Olivencia	TKO	2 (4)	12-02–2006	(United States) Boardwalk Hall, Atlantic City	
4	Win	4–0	(Puerto Rico) Arturo Colon	KO	1 (4)	09-30–2006	(Puerto Rico) Coliseo Héctor Solá Bezares, Caguas	
3	Win	3–0	(Puerto Rico) Jose Gonzalez	TKO	2 (4)	08-04–2006	(Puerto Rico) Coliseo Pedrín Zorrilla, Hato Rey	
2	Win	2–0	(Puerto Rico) Jose Gonzalez	TKO	2 (4)	04-29–2006	(Puerto Rico) Mario Morales Coliseum, Guaynabo	
1	Win	1–0	(Puerto Rico) Christopher Sanchez	TKO	1 (4)	03-04–2006	(Puerto Rico) Coliseo Rubén Rodríguez, Bayamon	Professional debut

== See also ==
- List of world featherweight boxing champions
- List of Puerto Rican boxing world champions

Sporting positions
World boxing titles
Preceded by Claudio Marrero	WBA featherweight champion Interim Title; September 15, 2017 – July 4, 2018; Promoted	Vacant Title next held by Jhack Tepora
Vacant Title last held by Abner Mares	WBA featherweight champion Regular Title; July 4, 2018 – January 26, 2019	Succeeded by Xu Can
