= Oscar De La Hoya vs. David Kamau =

Oscar Night at the Dome
- Date: June 14, 1997
- Venue: Alamodome, San Antonio, Texas, U.S.
- Title(s) on the line: WBC welterweight title

Tale of the tape
Boxer	Oscar De La Hoya	David Kamau
Nickname	The Golden Boy	DK
Hometown	East Los Angeles, California, U.S.	Nakuru, Nakuru County, Kenya
Purse	$3,000,000	$200,000
Pre-fight record	24–0 (20 KO)	28–1 (21 KO)
Age	24 years, 4 months	31 years, 10 months
Height	5 ft 10 in (178 cm)	5 ft 11 in (180 cm)
Weight	147 lb (67 kg)	146 3/4 lb (67 kg)
Style	Orthodox	Orthodox
Recognition	WBC; Welterweight Champion; The Ring No. 2 ranked pound-for-pound fighter 3-division world champion	WBC; No. 7 Ranked Welterweight

Result
- De La Hoya wins via 2nd-round knockout

Oscar De La Hoya vs. David Kamau, billed as Oscar Night at the Dome, was a professional boxing match contested on June 14, 1997 for the WBC welterweight title.

== Background ==
In his previous fight on April 12, 1997, Oscar De La Hoya had scored arguably his biggest victory over the number-two ranked pound-for-pound fighter Pernell Whitaker by unanimous decision, capturing Whitaker's WBC welterweight title and becoming a four-division world champion at only 24-years old. Whitaker, who felt he had clearly won the fight, and his promoter Dino Duva pursued a rematch with De La Hoya, offering him $12 million plus a percentage of the pay-per-view revenue, but De La Hoya's promoter Bob Arum declined the offer, as De La Hoya was already signed to face David Kamau at the Alamodome in San Antonio, Texas in June, followed by Héctor Camacho in September.

Prior to facing Kamau, De La Hoya, dissatisfied with his performance against his prior two opponents, Whitaker and Miguel Ángel González, dismissed his defensive-minded trainer Jesus Rivero and hired the highly regarded Emanuel Steward, known to implement a more offense orientated style of boxing, as his new trainer in early May. Steward expressed excitement on getting to work with De La Hoya stating "Oscar is the one I’ve been dreaming about. I’ve been watching him for a long time, and I’ve known he was special. Oscar has more natural talent than anyone I’ve ever worked with. But I never in a million years thought I would be working with him." After going the full 12-round distance in consecutive fights, De La Hoya openly stated that he was looking for a knockout victory stating "I'll be happy with a knockout. My last couple of opponents thought I had no power because I wasn't getting any knockouts. I was losing respect from my opponents, and that gets them more confident." Largely unknown, Kamau came into the fight as a heavy underdog, though he nevertheless expressed confidence "I don't step into a ring to lose. I am a strong fighter, and I know I can punch. Whatever it's going to take, that is what I'm going to do."

== The Fight ==
De La Hoya took a more cautious, tentative approach during the first round as Kamau served as the aggressor during the round, with De La Hoya constantly retreating, dodging Kamau's punches and effectively using his jab and counter-punching when Kamau approached. However, in the second, De La Hoya aggressively attacked Kamau, and sent him down to the canvas after landing a left hook. Kamau was able to answer the referee's 10-count and continued the fight, shaking off the knockdown as he continued to trade punches with De La Hoya until De La Hoya stunned Kamau with a left hook and sent him down again with a multi-punch combination. Clearly hurt from the exchange, Kamau remained on his knees, unable to get back up, as he was counted out, giving De La Hoya the victory by knockout at 2:54 of the round.

== Fight card ==
Confirmed bouts:

Weight Class	Weight		vs.		Method	Round	Notes
Welterweight	147 lbs.	Oscar De La Hoya (c)	def.	David Kamau	KO	2/12	^{note 1}
Super Featherweight	130 lbs.	Genaro Hernández (c)	def.	Anatoly Alexandrov	SD	12/12	^{note 2}
Super Lightweight	140 lbs.	Jesse James Leija	def.	Jose Rodriguez	UD	8/8
Lightweight	135 lbs.	Floyd Mayweather Jr.	def.	Larry O'Shields	UD	6/6
Welterweight	147 lbs.	Mikhail Krivolapov	def.	Guadalupe Rodriguez	TKO	4/6
Super Flyweight	115 lbs.	Eric Morel	def.	Armando Diaz	UD	4/4
Super Lightweight	140 lbs.	Arturo Ramos	def.	Raul Zavala	KO	1/4

^Note 1 For WBC Welterweight title
^Note 2 For WBC Super Featherweight title

== Broadcasting ==
Country	Broadcaster
United States	HBO
Thailand	Channel 7

Preceded by vs. Pernell Whitaker	Oscar De La Hoya's bouts 14 June 1997	Succeeded by vs. Héctor Camacho
Preceded by vs. Juan Carlos Rodriguez	David Kamau's bouts 14 June 1997	Succeeded by vs. Danny Perez Ramírez
