= Óscar Díaz =

Óscar Díaz is the name of:

- Oscar Díaz (boxer) (1982–2015), American boxer
- Óscar Díaz (Colombian footballer) (born 1972), Colombian footballer
- Óscar Díaz (Spanish footballer) (born 1984), Spanish footballer
- Óscar Díaz (Paraguayan footballer) (born 1984), Paraguayan footballer
- Óscar Díaz (Bolivian footballer) (born 1985), Bolivian footballer

== See also ==
- Tito Díaz (born 1984), Paraguayan footballer, full name Óscar Armando Díaz
