= Miguel Cotto vs. Shane Mosley =

Boxing match

Fast and Furious
- Date: November 10, 2007
- Venue: Madison Square Garden, New York City, New York, U.S.
- Title(s) on the line: WBA welterweight title

Tale of the tape
| Boxer | Miguel Cotto | Shane Mosley |
| Nickname | Junito | Sugar |
| Hometown | Caguas, Puerto Rico | Lynwood, California, U.S |
| Purse | $5,000,000 | $2,000,000 |
| Pre-fight record | 30–0 (25 KO) | 44–4 (37 KO) |
| Age | 27 years | 36 years, 2 months |
| Height | 5 ft 8 in (173 cm) | 5 ft 9 in (175 cm) |
| Weight | 146 1/4 lb (66 kg) | 146 1/4 lb (66 kg) |
| Style | Orthodox | Orthodox |
| Recognition | WBA; Welterweight Champion; The Ring; No. 2 Ranked Welterweight; The Ring pound-for-pound No. 10 ranked fighter | WBA; No. 1 Ranked Welterweight; The Ring; No. 3 Ranked Welterweight; 3-division world champion |

Result
- Miguel Cotto wins by UD (115-113, 116-113, 115-113)

Miguel Cotto vs. Shane Mosley, billed as Fast and Furious, was a professional boxing match contested on November 10, 2007, for the WBA welterweight championship. The bout at Madison Square Garden, New York City, New York, U.S. Cotto won via unanimous decision.

== Background ==
Miguel Cotto was a rising star in the boxing world, becoming the WBA welterweight champion in December 2006. He was still undefeated and had a style that was both technically and physically strong, having scored victories over established names like Zab Judah and Paul Malignaggi. His victory over Judah in June 2007 had elevated him back into The Ring pound for pound top 10.

Shane Mosley, on the other hand, was a more experienced fighter with an impressive career record. He had won titles in three weight classes and his name was established in the boxing world thanks to his strength against fighters such as Oscar De La Hoya and Floyd Mayweather Jr. This cast doubt on whether he would be able to overcome the young, undefeated Cotto. There were several reasons for the fight: Cotto's status as the undefeated champion and Mosley's desire to maintain his place at the top. The fight was promoted as a clash of styles, Cotto, the young and dynamic boxer with power and aggression, against Mosley, the technical and faster veteran.

The bout was announced on August 15 and would be promoted by Top Rank and Golden Boy Promotions, with HBO PPV broadcasting. The title of the fight was called "Fast & Furious", not in connection with the film, but to highlight the fast, explosive style of the two boxers.

== The fights ==
=== Casamayor vs. Santa Cruz ===
Fast and Furious: Joel Casamayor vs. José Santa Cruz
- Title(s) on the line: The Ring and WBC "Interim" lightweight title

Tale of the tape
| Boxer | Joel Casamayor | José Santa Cruz |
| Nickname | "El Cepillo" | |
| Hometown | Guantánamo, Guantánamo Province, Cuba | Michoacán, Mexico |
| Pre-fight record | 34–3–1 (16 KO) | 25–2 (14 KO) |
| Age | 36 years, 3 months | 27 years, 2 months |
| Height | 5 ft 7 in (170 cm) | 5 ft 10 in (178 cm) |
| Weight | 134 lb (61 kg) | 133 3/4 lb (61 kg) |
| Style | Southpaw | Orthodox |
| Recognition | The Ring and WBC "Interim"; Lightweight Champion | WBC; No. 1 Ranked Lightweight; The Ring; No. 7 Ranked Lightweight |

Result
- Casamayor defeats Santa Cruz by split decision

The first of the two world title bouts on the card saw Lightweight champion Joel Casamayor make the first defence of his title against José Santa Cruz.

After defeating Diego Corrales in their November 2006 rematch to win the WBC, The Ring and Lineal lightweight championship, Casamayor was stripped of the WBC belt in February 2007 for refusing to fight his mandatory challenger David Díaz, opting to face WBO titleholder Acelino Freitas, who had defeated him back in 2002.

==== The fight ====
A minute into the bout Santa Cruz scored a flash knockdown, landing with a counter straight left hand to the body. He would could continue to dominate the bout, outthrowing and outlanding the champion. According to Compubox Santa Cruz landed 246 of 801 punches (31%), compared to Casamayor landing 129 of 502 punches (26%).

Tony Paolillo scored the bout 114–113 for Santa Cruz overruled by Ron McNair and Frank Lombardi had it 114–113 for Casamayor giving him a split decision victory. HBO's unofficial judge, Harold Lederman had it 118–109 and ESPN had it 119–108 both for Santa Cruz.

==== Aftermath ====
The decision was booed the crowd and was immediately criticized by the HBO commentary team with Jim Lampley saying "Just when you think you've seen everything, just when you think you've seen decisions so bizarre that you think you'll never see anything worse than that, along comes something like this." Veteran trainer and colour commentator Emanuel Steward agreed, saying "This was a bad, disgusting decision, and that's putting it mildly."

| Preceded by vs. Diego Corrales II | Joel Casamayor's bouts 10 November 2007 | Succeeded by vs. Michael Katsidis |
| Preceded by vs. Dairo Esalas | José Santa Cruz's bouts 10 November 2007 | Succeeded by vs. Miguel Angel Munguia |

=== Margarito vs. Johnson ===
In the chief support, former WBO titleholder Antonio Margarito scored a first round stoppage over Golden Johnson.

| Preceded by vs. Paul Williams | Antonio Margarito's bouts 10 November 2007 | Succeeded by vs. Kermit Cintrón II |
| Preceded by vs. Oscar Díaz | Golden Johnson's bouts 10 November 2007 | Retired |

=== Main Event ===
==== Rounds 1–6 ====
The fight started with Mosley showcasing his speed and technique, while Cotto tried to apply pressure with his power and constant attack. Mosley had moments of success, with quick combinations and his famous counter-attacks. Cotto, however, stood his ground and tried to put Mosley in the corner with his heavy body shots and punches. The first six rounds were fairly even, but Cotto started to execute his strategy better and better and Mosley felt the power of Cotto's punches.

==== Rounds 7–9 ====
From the seventh round onwards Cotto clearly started to gain the upper hand. His body shots began to have a deadly impact on Mosley, who was increasingly forced to fight defensively. Mosley tried to counter it with his speed and technique, but Cotto was adamant and continued to lead the attack.

==== Rounds 10–12 ====
In the final rounds it was clear that Cotto was in control of the fight. Mosley was tired and his reactions were slower than in the early rounds. Cotto mounted a disciplined and methodical attack, while Mosley worked hard to fight back, but it proved not enough to turn the tide.

==== The result ====
After 12 rounds, Miguel Cotto was declared the winner via unanimous decision. The official scorecards were 115–113, 116–113, and 115–113 in Cotto's favor. HBO's unofficial ringside scorer Harold Lederman had it 115–113 for Cotto.

The fight was praised for the intensity and perseverance of both fighters, with Cotto showing his dominance in the later rounds.

== Aftermath ==
After the victory, Cotto was visibly happy and relieved. He was praised for his tactical approach, especially in the later rounds as he controlled Mosley's speed and power. His trainer, Evangelista Cotto, was very proud of his pupil.

Mosley, although defeated, was good sportsmanship and respectful. He acknowledged that Cotto was the better fighter the night of the fight. After the fight, Mosley said Cotto's body shots were heavy and made it difficult for him to use his speed and technique. Mosley was clearly disappointed, but he showed class in his defeat showing good sportsmanship and respect. He also acknowledged that Cotto was the better fighter on the night. Mosley praised Cotto as a worthy opponent, saying "Miguel was very strong, not only was he a powerful puncher but he can box. He mixed it up and did a hell of a good job. He's a young lion on the way to greatness."

Following his victory Cotto was linked to either the winner of the upcoming Floyd Mayweather Jr. vs. Ricky Hatton mega bout, Oscar De La Hoya, Antonio Margarito or Paul Williams.

The fight garnered approximately 400,000 PPV buys.

== Undercard ==
Confirmed bouts:

| Winner | Loser | Weight division/title belt(s) disputed | Result |
|---|---|---|---|
| (Mexico) Antonio Margarito | (United States) Golden Johnson | vacant WBO Inter-Continental Welterweight title | 1st round TKO |
| (Cuba) Joel Casamayor | (Mexico) José Santa Cruz | The Ring World Lightweight title | Split decision |
| (United States) Victor Ortiz | (Colombia) Carlos Maussa | Welterweight (10 rounds) | 1st round KO |
Non-TV bouts
| (Australia) Billy Dib | (Tanzania) Rogers Mtagwa | Super featherweight (8 rounds) | Unanimous decision |
| (Puerto Rico) Jesús Rojas | (Puerto Rico) Carlos Diaz | Super bantamweight (6 rounds) | 6th round TKO |
| (United States) Ronney Vargas | (United States) Bryan Mullis | Light middleweight (4 rounds) | Unanimous decision |
| (United States) Mike Faragon | (Puerto Rico) Javier Garcia | Light welterweight (4 rounds) | 2nd round TKO |
| (United States) Michael Anderson | (Guyana) Olade Thomas | Light middleweight (4 rounds) | Unanimous decision |

== Broadcasting ==
| Country | Broadcaster |
|---|---|
| Ireland & United Kingdom | Setanta Sport |
| United States | HBO |

| Preceded by vs. Zab Judah | Miguel Cotto's bouts 10 November 2007 | Succeeded by vs. Alfonso Gómez |
| Preceded by vs. Luis Collazo | Shane Mosley's bouts 10 November 2007 | Succeeded by vs. Ricardo Mayorga |
