= César Valdez (boxer) =

Mexican boxer (born 1964)

César Valdez Valenzuela (born December 28, 1964, in San Felipe, Nayarit, Mexico died 20 january 2026) was a Mexican professional boxer in the Welterweight division. He's also the former Baja California State Welterweight and the Pacific Coast Welterweight Champion.

== Pro career ==
One of César's best wins was an upset knockout over an undefeated Jose Alfredo Flores in Tijuana, Baja California, Mexico.

=== WBB Light Welterweight Championship ===
In September 1993, he lost his first title shot to World Boxing Board Light Welterweight champion David Kamau.

On November 29, 1997, Valdez lost to three-time world champion, American Antonio Margarito in Orleans Hotel & Casino, Las Vegas, Nevada.
