= Miguel Cotto vs. Zab Judah =

Boxing match

X-Plosive!
- Date: June 9, 2007
- Venue: Madison Square Garden, New York City, New York, U.S.
- Title(s) on the line: WBA welterweight title

Tale of the tape
Boxer	Miguel Cotto	Zab Judah
Nickname	"Junito"	"Super"
Hometown	Caguas, Puerto Rico	Brooklyn, New York, U.S.
Purse	$2,500,000	$1,000,000
Pre-fight record	29–0 (23 KO)	34–4 (2) (25 KO)
Age	26 years, 7 months	29 years, 7 months
Height	5 ft 7 in (170 cm)	5 ft 7 in (170 cm)
Weight	146 1/2 lb (66 kg)	145 lb (66 kg)
Style	Orthodox	Southpaw
Recognition	WBA; Welterweight Champion; The Ring; No. 3 Ranked Welterweight	WBA; No. 4 Ranked Welterweight; The Ring; No. 5 Ranked Welterweight; 2-division world champion

Result
- Cotto defeats Judah by 11th round TKO

Miguel Cotto vs. Zab Judah, billed as X-Plosive!, was a professional boxing match contested on June 9, 2007, for the WBA welterweight championship.

== Background ==
After winning the vacant WBA welterweight title against Carlos Quintana in December 2006, Miguel Cotto initially sort a bout with WBO titleholder Antonio Margarito, however after Margarito declined to face Cotto, in February 2007 he signed to face former undisputed welterweight champion Zab Judah in June. This was provided that he successfully got past mandatory challenger Oktay Urkal in March, which he did.

Judah meanwhile had been out of the ring since his April 2006 loss to Floyd Mayweather Jr. thanks to a one-year revocation of his boxing license for his part in the 10th round melee with the Mayweather corner. He returned for a tune up in April 2007 against Ruben Galvan which ended in a No Contest following an accidental foul causing a cut on Galvan. This meant that Judah entered the Cotto bout without a win in his last 3 bouts. Nevertheless, the Cotto Judah bout was officially announced shortly afterwards.

Speaking in the pre fight press conference Judah said "Cotto has never faced anyone with my fast hands" to which Cotto countered "I have had the best training camp I have ever had in my life and I am going to destroy Zab Judah. He may be a great fighter but he is not the best fighter and I will teach him that difference when we meet in the ring. I've always dreamed of being one of the greatest champions from Puerto Rico, like Wilfred Benítez and Félix Trinidad - I am on my way".

Cotto was a 2 to 1 favourite to win.

== The fight ==
The sold-out crowd of 20,658 (the most at MSG since Evander Holyfield vs. Lennox Lewis in 1999) witnessed an all-action brawl. Judah started the bout the stronger wobbling Cotto with an uppercut followed by a flurry of punches. However Cotto landed a hard low blow, with just over a minute left in the opening round, which sent Judah to the canvas, clearly in pain. Although he was entitled to take 5 minutes to recover, Judah following encouragement from referee Arthur Mercante Jr., resumed the bout less than two minutes after the Cotto foul. The round ended without further incident, although Judah still appeared uncomfortable.

Cotto had the better of much of the 2nd before Judah landed his signature straight left cross with only 20 seconds in the round, momentary halting the champion's momentum. A minute into the 3rd, Cotto a second hard low blow on Judah, who again was sent to canvas in clear pain. This time Mercante deducted a point from Cotto before telling a recovering Judah to "shake it off". The action resumed after only a minute of the 5 available to the challenger, and Judah ended the round by landing another pair of straight lefts. The 4th would see a cut opened over Judah's right eye following a clash of head as Cotto began to take control of the bout, firing combinations at close range.

Judah would be warned in the 6th for landing a punch on a cut that had opened above Cotto's right eye after the referee had called break. The 7th round saw extended toe-to-toe action, as Judah staggered Cotto with a right hook, before following up with a flurry of punches that had the champion hanging on in order to stay up. Cotto turned the tables in the 8th, appearing to hurt the challenger with an uppercut and left hand. Judah would defiantly pound his heart late in the round despite the beating he was enduring in the round. In the 9th Cotto continued to relentlessly hand left hand shots, eventually forcing Judah to take a knee with just over a minute left in round, triggering a count from the referee and giving him some respite. Cotto landed a pair of left hooks before taking a right from the challenger right at the death. By the 10th the bleeding from the cut above Judah's eye had worsened and the champion remained in control, landing more left hand shot as well as an uppercut which forced the challenger up against the ropes. Judah again weathered the attack and would again pound his chest at Cotto in defiance.

Early in the 11th a short right hand followed by a left sent Judah down. He beat the count but he appeared hurt. Cotto continued his attack and shortly afterwards the referee stepped in to stop the bout give Cotto a TKO victory and to hand Judah his first stoppage loss since 2001.

At the time of the stoppage Cotto led on all three scorecards 97–91 as well as on the card of HBO's unofficial ringside scorer Harold Lederman.

According to CompuBox, Cotto landed 292 of 683 punches thrown (a 42.8% connect rate) against Judah landing 132 of 459 (a 28.8% connect rate).

== Aftermath ==
Speaking after the bout Cotto said "I expected a tough fight and that's what I got, a tough fight. He did land some great punches on me but I was very well prepared. I could tell and I could feel I was taking the fight over round by round. I don't speak bad of Zab. I know the kind of fighter Zab is. That's the reason I worked so hard in the gym." Judah admitted that the low blows affected him but refused to blame them for his loss "The first low blow was very hard. The second one took a lot out of me. The low blows affected me from the time they hit me. No excuses, though. I would love to get a rematch in Puerto Rico. It would be beautiful. Miguel Cotto is a great young fighter. Miguel Cotto and Zab Judah are two of the greatest fighters of today. Every time Zab Judah steps in the ring, it's an action-packed fight. I showed that tonight."

Top Rank president Todd duBoef would suggest that he wanted a make a unification bout with WBC, The Ring and lineal champion Floyd Mayweather Jr. saying "Miguel has always wanted to fight Mayweather. The Cotto family wants the fight. I think it's doable from our perspective. It depends on what Floyd's expectations are after a big win against Oscar [De La Hoya]."

Despite his 3rd loss in his last 4 bouts, Judah was praised for his performance.

== Undercard ==
Confirmed bouts:

Winner	Loser	Weight division/title belt(s) disputed	Result
(Mexico) Humberto Soto	(Philippines) Bobby Pacquiao	Super Featherweight (10 rounds)	7th-round KO
(Mexico) Julio César Chávez Jr.	(United States) Grover Wiley	Light Middleweight (10 rounds)	3rd-round KO
(Israel) Yuri Foreman	(United States) Anthony Thompson	Middleweight (10 rounds)	Split decision
Non-TV bouts
(United States) Peter Quillin	(United States) Jamaal Davis	Middleweight (8 rounds)	Unanimous decision
(United States) Wayne Johnsen	(United States) Anthony Bartinelli	Middleweight (6 rounds)	Unanimous decision
(Puerto Rico) Jesús Rojas	(United States) Torrence Daniels	Super Bantamweight (6 rounds)	Unanimous decision
(Dominican Republic) Argenis Mendez	(United States) Bobby Campbell	Featherweight (4 rounds)	1st-round TKO

== Broadcasting ==
Country	Broadcaster
Ireland & United Kingdom	Setanta Sports
United States	HBO

Preceded by vs. Oktay Urkal	Miguel Cotto's bouts 9 June 2007	Succeeded by vs. Shane Mosley
Preceded by vs. Rubén Galván	Zab Judah's bouts 9 June 2007	Succeeded by vs. Edwin Vasquez
