= Miguel González (Mexican boxer) =

Mexican boxer (born 1967)

Miguel González (born August 12, 1967, in Coatzacoalcos, Veracruz, Mexico) is a Mexican professional boxer in the Welterweight division.

== Pro career ==
In March 1991, he lost his first title shot to Mexico National Lightweight champion Omar Flores.

Miguel almost upset two-time world champion Roger Mayweather in Hilton Hotel, Laughlin, Nevada.

On April 24, 1998, González lost to three-time world champion, American Antonio Margarito in Scottish Rite Center, San Diego, California, Nevada. He has also fought César Valdez Valenzuela, and two-time world champion Daniel Santos.
