= Seckbach =

Seckbach may refer to:

- Seckbach (Frankfurt am Main), a district or Stadtteil of Frankfurt am Main, Germany

== People with the surname ==
- Elie Seckbach, sports writer
