= Manny Pacquiao vs. David Díaz =

Boxing match

Lethal Combination
- Date: June 28, 2008
- Venue: Mandalay Bay Events Center, Paradise, Nevada, U.S.
- Title(s) on the line: WBC lightweight title

Tale of the tape
Boxer	David Díaz	Manny Pacquiao
Nickname	Dangerous	Pac-Man
Hometown	Chicago, Illinois, U.S.	General Santos, Soccsksargen, Philippines
Purse	$850,000	$3,000,000
Pre-fight record	34–1–1 (17 KO)	46–3–2 (34 KO)
Age	32 years	29 years, 6 months
Height	5 ft 6 in (168 cm)	5 ft 6 1/2 in (169 cm)
Weight	135 lb (61 kg)	134 1/2 lb (61 kg)
Style	Southpaw	Southpaw
Recognition	WBC; Lightweight Champion; The Ring; No. 2 Ranked Lightweight	WBC and The Ring; Super Featherweight Champion; The Ring No. 1 ranked pound-for-pound fighter 4-division world champion

Result
- Pacquiao wins via 9th-round TKO

Manny Pacquiao vs. David Díaz, billed as Lethal Combination, was a professional boxing match contested on June 28, 2008, for the WBC lightweight championship. Pacquiao defeated Diaz via technical knockout in the ninth round.

== Background ==
Pacquiao came into the fight following a close bout in March 2008 split decision victory over Juan Manuel Marquez for a super featherweight title. Top Rank CEO Bob Arum matched Pacquiao against Diaz when Pacquiao decided to move up to lightweight division. Diaz, the WBC champion made his last title defense by beating Pacquiao's most recent conqueror, Erik Morales, via unanimous decision in August 2007.

The bout took place at the Mandalay Bay, Las Vegas, Nevada, U.S.

== The fight ==
Pacquiao was stronger and faster than Diaz, pounding him with big punches from the first round on. Early in the bout, Pacquiao would step in and rip off three and four punch combinations at a time. He cut the nose of Diaz in the second round and a few rounds later he opened a gash above the right eye of Diaz, turning the fight into a bloody affair. The cut was bad enough to prompt the referee to have the doctor look at it twice during the fight. Pacquiao hurt Diaz with an uppercut in round eight and in the ninth round, a jab followed by a left hand that Diaz never saw coming, sent him down face first to the mat and the referee jumped in to stop the action.

== Aftermath ==
Having The Ring and WBC super featherweight titles as well as the latter's lightweight version, Pacquiao decided to vacate his super featherweight titles. Light welterweight champion Ricky Hatton is eyed by Pacquiao as his next opponent.

After the fight, Pacquiao's performance sealed his status as the best pound-for-pound fighter because of the retirement of the undefeated five-division champion Floyd Mayweather Jr. weeks prior to the fight and put Pacquiao's name in the history books as the only Asian fighter to win five world titles in five weight classes.

== Business ==
Arum reported that the fight had made 12.5 million dollars (250,000 pay-per-view subscriptions at $49.95 each), earning Diaz his best payday of 850,000 dollars, whilst Pacquiao earned at least 3 million dollars. Official records revealed an attendance of 8,362 (out of a maximum capacity of 12,000).

== Undercard ==
Confirmed bouts:

== Broadcasting ==
Country	Broadcaster
Philippines	Solar Sports
Ireland & United Kingdom	Setanta Sport
United States	HBO

Preceded by vs. Ramon Montano	David Díaz's bouts 28 June 2008	Succeeded by vs. Jesus Chavez
Preceded by vs. Juan Manuel Marquez II	Manny Pacquiao's bouts 28 June 2008	Succeeded by vs. Oscar De La Hoya
