= Miguel Cotto vs. Antonio Margarito =

Boxing match

The Battle
- Date: July 26, 2008
- Venue: MGM Grand Garden Arena, Paradise, Nevada, U.S.
- Title on the line: WBA welterweight title

Tale of the tape
Boxer	Miguel Cotto	Antonio Margarito
Nickname	"Junito"	"The Tijuana Tornado"
Hometown	Caguas, Puerto Rico	Tijuana, Mexico
Pre-fight record	32–0 (26 KO)	36–5 (26 KO)
Age	27 years, 8 months	30 years, 4 months
Height	5 ft 8 in (173 cm)	5 ft 11 in (180 cm)
Weight	147 lb (67 kg)	147 lb (67 kg)
Style	Orthodox	Orthodox
Recognition	WBA; Welterweight Champion; The Ring; No. 1 Ranked Welterweight; The Ring No. 6 ranked pound-for-pound fighter 2-division world champion	The Ring; No. 4 Ranked Welterweight; 2-time former welterweight champion

Result
- Margarito wins by technical knockout in round 11

Miguel Cotto vs. Antonio Margarito, billed as "The Battle", was a professional boxing match between WBA welterweight champion Miguel Cotto and former IBF and WBO welterweight champion Antonio Margarito. The WBA welterweight title bout took place on July 26, 2008, at the MGM Grand in Paradise, Nevada, and resulted in an eleventh round technical knockout victory for Margarito. Margarito was later suspected of cheating in this bout after controversy arose over his use of hand wraps after his bout with Shane Mosley.

Both men had previously fought on April 12 and emerged victorious, thus clearing the way for a July 26 match between the two boxers. It was Cotto's first fight in Las Vegas since December 2004. According to promoter Bob Arum, the bout took place in Las Vegas to promote Cotto to a new audience while also appealing to Margarito's Mexican American fans in California. Cotto entered the fight as The Ring magazine's #1 ranked boxer in the welterweight division and #6 in their pound-for-pound rankings. Margarito entered the match as The Ring magazine's #4 ranked welterweight. Press conferences were held in Mexico, Los Angeles, New York City, and Puerto Rico to promote the world title bout.

Cotto and Margarito's aggressive boxing styles led to much praise from multiple boxing writers. Kevin Iole of Yahoo! Sports named it the third-best boxing match of 2008 and the fight generated 450,000 pay-per-view buys, the third-highest in 2008 for a boxing match.

== Background ==
=== Miguel Cotto ===
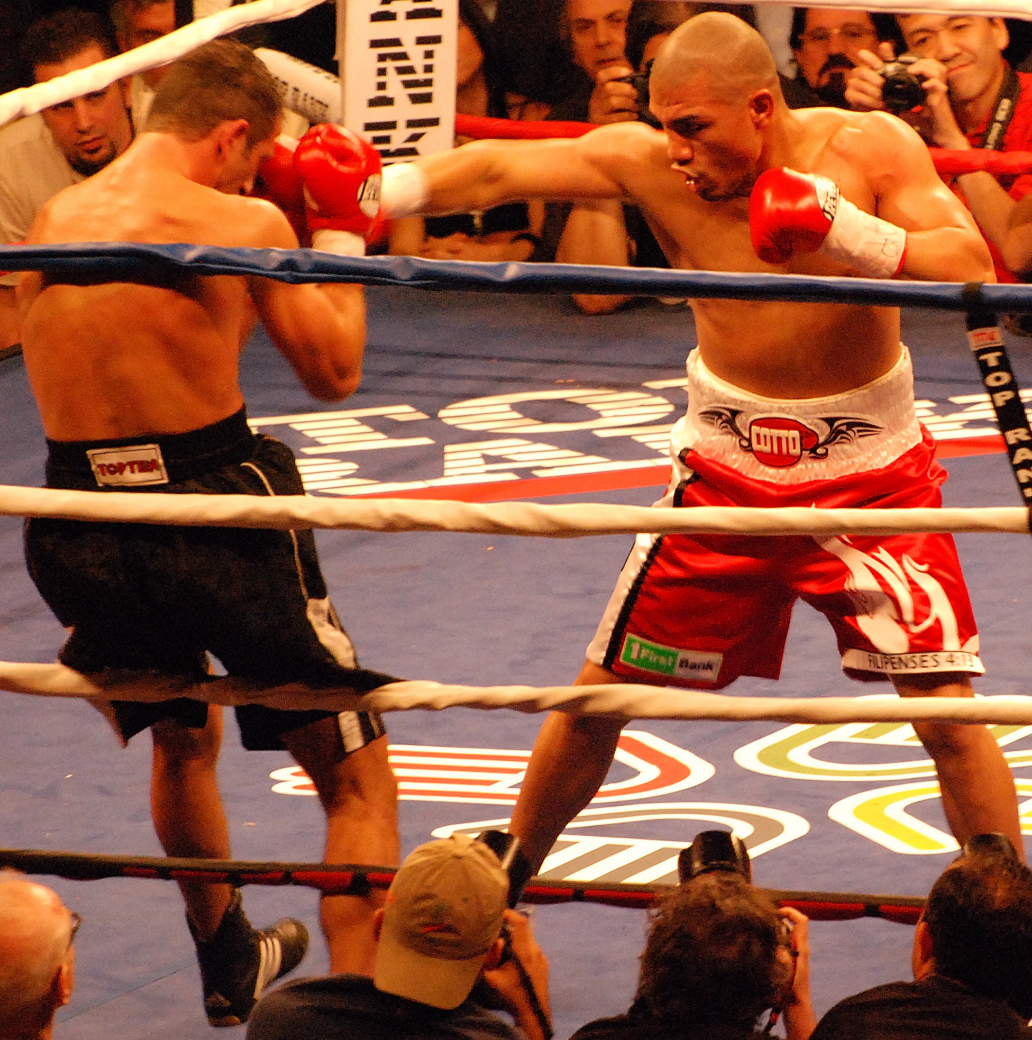
Miguel Cotto (right) against Oktay Urkal on March 3, 2007

After making six successful defenses of the World Boxing Organization (WBO) light welterweight title, Cotto moved up in weight class to the welterweight division and defeated Carlos Quintana on December 2, 2006 to win the World Boxing Association (WBA) welterweight title. Cotto's first title defense came against mandatory challenger Oktay Urkal in a bout that took place on March 3, 2007, at the Roberto Clemente Coliseum in San Juan, Puerto Rico. A mandatory challenger is a boxer who is chosen by a boxing organization to fight for their title. If the champion decides not to defend the title against the mandatory challenger, the boxing organization strips him of his title. In attendance for the bout was former undisputed welterweight champion Zab Judah, who was expected to be Cotto's next opponent as long as Cotto defeated Urkal and Judah won his fight in April. Cotto displayed a dominant performance against Urkal, eventually to the point where Urkal's corner retired in the eleventh round. On April 13, 2007, Judah's match with journeyman boxer Ruben Galvan ended in a no contest after a severe cut opened up around Galvan's hairline, which was ruled to have been caused by Judah's elbow. Despite the no contest, the bout between Cotto and Judah went ahead as planned, taking place at Madison Square Garden in New York City on June 9, 2007. In front of a sellout crowd of 20,658, Cotto defeated Judah by technical knockout in the eleventh round.

In his next fight, Cotto fought former three-division champion Shane Mosley on November 10, 2007. Mosley had originally set his sights on fighting World Boxing Council (WBC) welterweight champion Floyd Mayweather Jr., but Mayweather was in negotiations to fight Ricky Hatton, and on July 28, 2007, Mayweather and Hatton officially agreed to the fight. With the two fights scheduled to take place a month apart from each other, the media speculated that the winners of the two fights would likely fight each other next. Cotto was successful in his third title defense, defeating Mosley by unanimous decision at Madison Square Garden in New York City, while one month later, Mayweather defeated Hatton by tenth round technical knockout at the MGM Grand in Paradise, Nevada. Following his victory, Mayweather announced that he would take a two-year layoff from boxing to focus on his promotional company. However, one month later, Mayweather began negotiations for a rematch with Oscar De La Hoya. With several top welterweight fighters unavailable, Cotto agreed to fight Alfonso Gomez, a fighter most notable for appearing on the first season of The Contender. The match took place on April 12, 2008, at Boardwalk Hall in Atlantic City, New Jersey, and resulted in a victory for Cotto after the ring doctor stopped the fight after round five.

=== Antonio Margarito ===
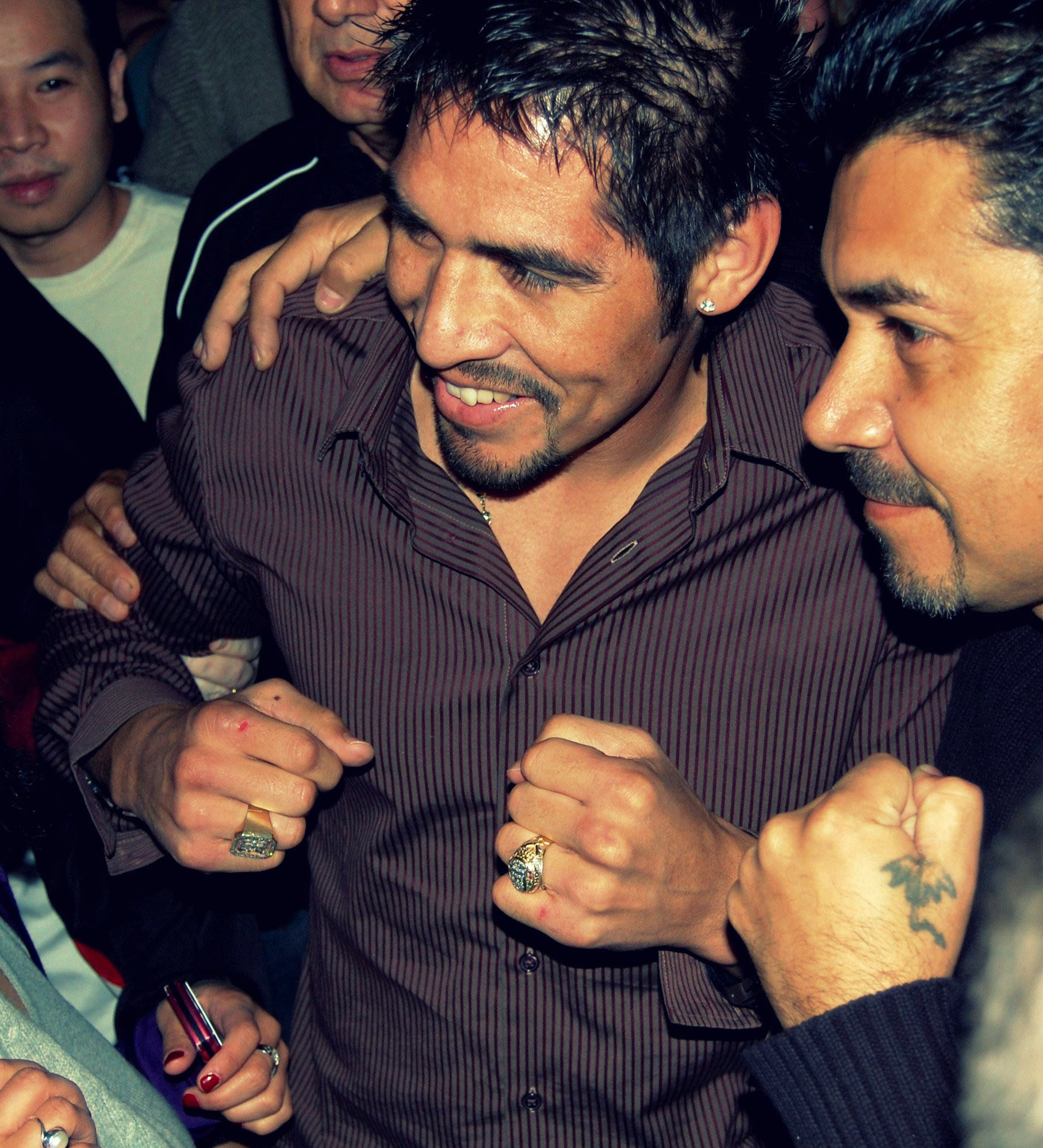
Antonio Margarito

On July 21, 2001, Margarito's bout with WBO welterweight champion Daniel Santos ended in a no contest after the fighters' heads collided in the first round and a deep cut was opened over the corner of Margarito's right eyebrow. He would get another opportunity to win the WBO title on March 16, 2002 against Antonio Diaz. Margarito defeated Diaz by tenth round technical knockout to win the title, which had been vacated by Santos. Seven months later, he made his first successful defense of the WBO title with a unanimous decision victory over Danny Perez. His second title defense came against former WBA welterweight champion Andrew Lewis at the Mandalay Bay Resort and Casino in Las Vegas on February 8, 2003. Margarito won the fight by second round technical knockout after a significant amount of punches from Margarito led to a stoppage from the referee. On January 31, 2004, at the Dodge Theatre in Phoenix, Arizona, Margarito defeated Hercules Kyvelos by second round technical knockout in his third title defense. After the fight, he discussed his interest in a major fight with Oscar De La Hoya, Shane Mosley, or Fernando Vargas.

In his next fight, Margarito moved up in weight class for a rematch with Daniel Santos, who possessed the WBO junior welterweight title. The fight took place on September 11, 2004 and ended in a technical decision victory for Santos after Margarito was cut over the right eye by an unintentional headbutt in round six. After round nine it was ruled Margarito could not continue, so the fight was decided on the scorecards and Santos led 86–85, 87–84 on two cards while Margarito was ahead 86–85 on the third scorecard. After the loss, Margarito moved back down in weight to defend his WBO welterweight title against Sebastian Lujan on February 18, 2005. He won the fight by technical knockout in the tenth round and set up a fight against Kermit Cintron, who was in attendance for Margarito's fight with Lujan. On April 23, 2005, Margarito defeated the less experienced Cintron, knocking him down four times en route to a technical knockout victory in the fifth round at Caesars Palace in Las Vegas. Margarito's next fight took place on February 18, 2006, when he defeated Manuel Gomez by technical knockout in just 74 seconds in Las Vegas.

After Floyd Mayweather Jr. defeated Zab Judah on April 8, 2006, he rejected an $8 million offer from promoter Bob Arum to fight Margarito on August 12, 2006, citing a hand injury as the reason he did not take the bout. On December 2, 2006, Margarito successfully defended the WBO welterweight title for the seventh time with a unanimous decision victory over Joshua Clottey. On July 14, 2007, Margarito fought Paul Williams in his eighth title defense at the Home Depot Center in Carson, California. With a victory, Margarito would set himself up for a welterweight title unification match against Miguel Cotto in the autumn, but Margarito lost to Williams by unanimous decision. Four months later, Margarito knocked out Golden Johnson in the first round at Madison Square Garden in New York City. On April 12, 2008, Margarito had a rematch with Kermit Cintron, who held the IBF welterweight title. The match took place on the undercard of Cotto's fight with Alfonso Gomez and Margarito knocked out Cintron in the sixth round to win the title.

=== Pre-fight information ===
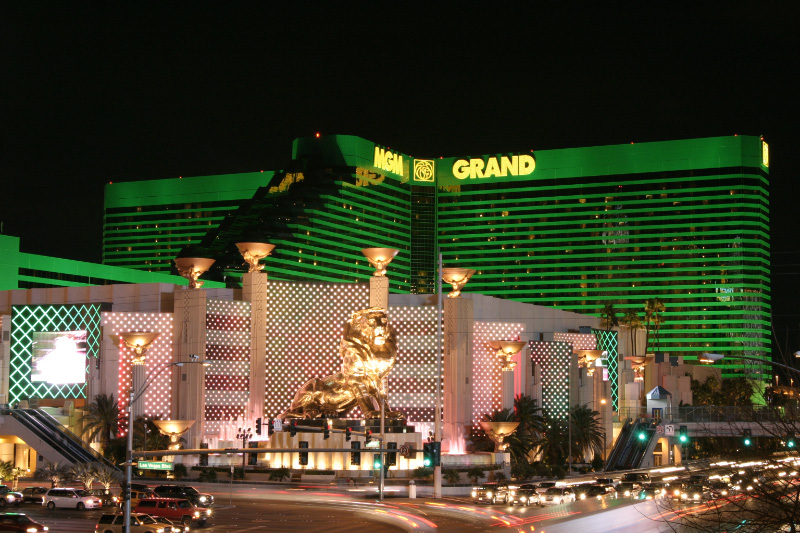
The MGM Grand, site of "The Battle"

Both fighters' victories on April 12 cleared the way for a July 26 showdown between Cotto and Margarito. The WBA welterweight title fight took place at the MGM Grand Las Vegas, marking the first time Cotto headlined a Las Vegas card. It was Cotto's first fight in Las Vegas since December 11, 2004, on the undercard of Vitali Klitschko's bout with Danny Williams. According to Bob Arum, the match took place in Las Vegas to promote Cotto to a new audience while also appealing to Margarito's Mexican American fans in California. The Las Vegas notion gained momentum in the previous month when the Nevada Athletic Commission amended its provisional rules on glove size, allowing welterweights to wear 8 ounce (227 g) gloves instead of the previously mandated 10 ounce (284 g) gloves. Nearly every other boxing jurisdiction in the United States allows welterweights to fight with 8 ounce gloves, and both Cotto and Margarito likely would have refused to fight in Las Vegas without their usual glove size. Margarito had to vacate the IBF welterweight title after the IBF mandated him to defend the title against Joshua Clottey. Press conferences were held in Mexico, Los Angeles, New York City, and Puerto Rico to promote the world title bout.

Cotto entered the fight as The Ring magazine's #1 ranked boxer in the welterweight division and #6 in their pound-for-pound rankings. Margarito entered the match as The Ring magazine's #4 ranked welterweight. The official judges for the bout were Dave Moretti, Jerry Roth, and Glen Hamada, and the referee was Kenny Bayless. Serving as the ring announcer for the fight was Michael Buffer. Promoted by Arum's Top Rank Boxing promotional company, the match aired on Home Box Office (HBO) Pay-Per-View. Cotto entered the fight as a two-to-one betting favorite, and the official attendance for the event was 10,477. Both Margarito and Cotto weighed in at the welterweight limit of 147 pounds (67 kg).

=== Opinions ===
Cotto and Margarito's aggressive boxing styles led to much speculation of a potential fight of the year candidate. Junior welterweight titleholder Paulie Malignaggi said that the fight would be "pure entertainment", and HBO commentator Jim Lampley said that "I'm asking for one of my top 10 fights in my 22 years of calling fights on television". Dave Larzelere of Sporting News wrote that the bout had "the potential to be one of those epic Irresistible Force vs. Immoveable Object kind of battles that we talk about forever afterwards, à la Hagler/Hearns or Corrales/Castillo". Jeff Haney of the Las Vegas Sun described the fight as "not only the sport’s most promising matchup of the year. It also conjures memories of past fights in which regional or national pride was at stake", noting the rivalry between Mexico and Puerto Rico. The Arizona Republic wrote, "Cotto, an impassive and intimidating Puerto Rican, and Margarito, a patient and tough Mexican, are another chapter in a rivalry rich in legends and still productive". Yahoo! Sports writer Kevin Iole felt that the boxing match would provide a performance similar to that of the fight between Jose Luis Castillo and Diego Corrales, which was named fight of the year by The Ring magazine.

== The fight ==
Margarito, traditionally a sluggish starter, anticipated to emerge swift, but it was Cotto who got off to a more effective start by throwing numerous punches and applying plenty of movement. Cotto picked up where he left off in the second round, approaching directly at Margarito though easily getting by harm's way once Margarito sought to counterpunch. That, nevertheless, changed approximately a minute into the round, as Margarito landed a right hand that momentarily had Cotto by the ropes. Margarito directed his assault to Cotto's body, but Cotto landed various left hooks. Blood started descending from Cotto's nose, but did not discourage him from closing the round by landing a punch upon Margarito. Mobility represented the key for Cotto in the third round, efficaciously blending boxing and brawling while trying to minimize the blood flow from his nose and a small cut over his left eye. Margarito continued targeting the body, but drew two distinguish warnings for low blows in the span of less than a minute. Margarito closed the gap sufficiency in the fourth round by landing a right uppercut and attacking Cotto's body to slow him down. In the fifth round, Cotto provided plenty of lateral movement which frustrated Margarito. Cotto persisted on the move and would land a flurry of punches prior to directly escaping harm's way. Margarito landed a straight right hand that had Cotto temporarily unsteady with ten seconds to go, but Cotto eluded all of the ensuing punches until the final bell.

While Margarito did not land a lot of punches, he remained the more engaged fighter in the sixth round. A left hook to the body had Cotto on the defensive early in the seventh round, but he was able to fend off additional difficulty. A right hand from Cotto slowed Margarito, but he returned with punches that forced Cotto to clinch. Margarito commanded the bulk of the round, throwing 130 punches in the round according to Compubox. Cotto was advocated by his corner in between rounds to stay off the ropes. He obliged, providing lateral movement throughout the round but with approximately 30 seconds left, Margarito was able to trap Cotto in a corner, but Cotto managed to escape. It was more of the same in the ninth round, with Cotto going back and forth between southpaw and conventional stance. Margarito continued charging ahead, although Cotto would counterpunch sufficiency to avoid Margarito. The same pattern applied as in the previous two rounds, with Margarito charging forward and Cotto using movement while anticipating chances to counterpunch. Margarito immediately concluded the gap in the final 15 seconds, landing a left hook, left uppercut and right hand that had Cotto against the ropes. Halfway through the eleventh round, a left uppercut by Margarito left Cotto vulnerable as he took a knee after Margarito landed a right uppercut and two right hands. Cotto managed to get up, but he went down again, despite Margarito not landing another punch. The referee moved in to count, but Evangelista Cotto, Cotto's trainer and uncle, climbed onto the ring apron and threw in the towel. The official time of the stoppage was 2:05 of round eleven.

== Aftermath ==
Dan Rafael of ESPN.com described the fight as a "riveting slugfest with a dramatic ending that left the throbbing crowd of 10,477 at the MGM Grand Garden Arena in ecstasy". The referee for the bout Kenny Bayless called it "the best fight I've ever done". Fightnews.com writers Andreas Hale and Victor Perea called it "an instant classic that gave boxing fans all over the world all they could handle...and then some". Dave Larzelere of Sporting News wrote that it "was unquestionably the fight of the year". Compubox wrote, "Margarito-Cotto was billed as 'The Battle' and it certainly lived up to the name as they proved why they are among the best boxing has to offer". BoxingScene.com writer Jake Donovan wrote that "It was brutal, and lived up to everyone's exceedingly high expectations". Kevin Iole of Yahoo! Sports named it the third best boxing match of 2008. The fight generated 450,000 pay-per-view buys, the third highest in 2008 for a boxing match.

Following the victory, Margarito became The Ring magazine's #1 ranked boxer in the welterweight division, and he replaced Cotto in their rankings as the #6 ranked boxer in the world, pound-for-pound. For Cotto, The Ring magazine dropped him to #3 in their welterweight rankings and #10 in their pound-for-pound rankings. With the loss, Cotto's fight with Oscar De La Hoya, which would have guaranteed Cotto $25 million, was off. De La Hoya instead opted to fight The Ring magazine's #1 ranked pound-for-pound boxer Manny Pacquiao on December 6, 2008, at the MGM Grand Las Vegas. Margarito made his first title defense against Shane Mosley on January 24, 2009, losing to him by technical knockout in the ninth round. The California State Athletic Commission revoked the licenses of Margarito and his trainer Javier Capetillo for a year on February 10, 2009, after it was discovered before the fight that a plaster-like substance on illegal pads was found inside Margarito's hand wraps. On February 21, 2009, at Madison Square Garden in New York City, Cotto claimed the vacant WBO welterweight title by defeating Michael Jennings by fifth round technical knockout. In his second title defense, Cotto defeated former IBF welterweight champion Joshua Clottey by split decision at Madison Square Garden on June 13, 2009.

The pair had a rematch, which Cotto won by tenth round technical knockout.

== Undercard ==
Confirmed bouts:

== Broadcasting ==
Country	Broadcaster
Ireland & United Kingdom	Setanta Sports
United States	HBO

Preceded by vs. Alfonso Gómez	Miguel Cotto's bouts 26 July 2008	Succeeded by vs. Michael Jennings
Preceded by vs. Kermit Cintrón II	Antonio Margarito's bouts 26 July 2008	Succeeded by vs. Shane Mosley
