= Golden Johnson =

American boxer

Personal information
- Nickname: Fourteen Carat
- Born: Golden Demond Johnson; October 23, 1974 (age 51) Wichita Falls, Texas, U.S.
- Height: 5 ft 10 in (178 cm)
- Weight: Light Middleweight; Welterweight

Boxing career
- Reach: 72 in (183 cm)
- Stance: Orthodox

Boxing record
- Total fights: 36
- Wins: 25
- Win by KO: 18
- Losses: 8
- Draws: 3

Golden Demond Johnson (born October 23, 1974) is an American professional boxer in the welterweight division. He's the former three-time NABF champion at lightweight, light welterweight, and welterweight.

== Personal life ==
Golden Johnson is the cousin of former world champion Reggie Johnson. He was born in Wichita Falls, Texas, and is a resident of Killeen, Texas. He currently lives in San Antonio, Texas.

== Professional career ==
Johnson made his debut in professional boxing with a first-round knockout win over Chris George on September 3, 1993. Johnson then lost in his very next fight, a second-round knockout at the hands of Pedro Calderon. Johnson's career failed to take off immediately, as he compiled a record of 4 wins, 1 loss, and 2 draws in the first year of his career.

Starting in October 1994, however, Johnson went on an eleven fight win streak before losing to title contender Israel Cardona (29-2).

=== IBF Lightweight Championship ===
In January 1999, Johnson lost to an undefeated Shane Mosley in a bout was for the IBF Lightweight Championship. Johnson continued to win most of his fights in subsequent years mixing in losses against boxers including Ben Tackie and Vivian Harris.

=== WBO Inter-Continental ===
In 2006 Johnson secured an upset win over prospect Oscar Diaz, setting up a fight for the vacant WBO Inter-Continental welterweight Championship against Antonio Margarito. Johnson was dispatched quickly by Margarito, losing by TKO at 2:28 of the 1st round.

== Professional boxing record ==
36 fights	25 wins	8 losses
By knockout	18	4
By decision	7	4
Draws	3	

25 wins (18 knockouts, 7 decisions), 8 losses, 3 draws
Res.	Record	Opponent	Type	Rd., Time	Date	Location	Notes
Loss	25-8-3	(Mexico) Antonio Margarito	TKO	1 (12)	Nov 10, 2007	(United States) Madison Square Garden, New York	For vacant WBO Inter-Continental Welterweight Title.
Win	25-7-3	(United States) Oscar Díaz	TKO	11 (12)	2006-11-10	(United States) Alamodome, San Antonio	Won WBC-NABF welterweight title
Draw	24-7-3	(United States) Larry Mosley	PTS	12	2006-05-11	(United States) Reliant Center, Houston	
Win	24-7-2	(United States) Ramon Gomez	TKO	3 (8)	2005-11-18	(United States) Rosedale Ballroom, San Antonio	
Win	23-7-2	(Mexico) Freddy Hernandez	SD	12	2005-02-25	(United States) Show Palace, Oceanside	
Loss	22-7-2	(Mexico) Sebastian Valdez	UD	12	2002-09-20	(United States) Orleans Hotel & Casino, Las Vegas	
Loss	22-6-2	(Mexico) Cosme Rivera	UD	12	2002-07-27	(United States) Scope Arena, Norfolk	For WBC Continental Americas Super Lightweight Title.
Win	22-5-2	(United States) Chantel Stanciel	KO	11 (12)	2002-03-15	(United States) Cipriani's Restaurant, New York	
Win	21-5-2	(United States) Johnny Casas	TKO	4 (10)	2001-10-26	(United States) Erwin Center, Austin	
Loss	20-5-2	(Guyana) Vivian Harris	KO	3 (10)	2001-06-15	(United States) Blue Horizon, Philadelphia	
