= Miguel Cotto vs. Alfonso Gómez =

Boxing match

- Date: April 12, 2008
- Venue: Boardwalk Hall, Atlantic City, New Jersey, U.S.
- Title(s) on the line: WBA welterweight title

Tale of the tape
Boxer	Miguel Cotto	Alfonso Gómez
Nickname	Junito	
Hometown	Caguas, Puerto Rico	Guadalajara, Mexico
Pre-fight record	31–0 (25 KO)	18–3–2 (8 KO)
Age	27 years, 5 months	27 years, 5 months
Height	5 ft 8 in (173 cm)	5 ft 9 in (175 cm)
Weight	146 1/2 lb (66 kg)	147 lb (67 kg)
Style	Orthodox	Orthodox
Recognition	WBA; Welterweight Champion; The Ring; No. 2 Ranked Welterweight	WBA; No. 9 Ranked Welterweight

Result
- Cotto wins via 5th-round corner retirement

Miguel Cotto vs. Alfonso Gómez was a professional boxing match contested on April 12, 2008, for the WBA welterweight title.

== Background ==
In late January 2008, it was announced that a doubleheader boxing event would take place that April in which WBA welterweight champion Miguel Cotto would defend his title against Alfonso Gómez, while IBF welterweight champion Kermit Cintrón would defend his title against Antonio Margarito. Both fights had huge implications as the winners of each fight were then expected to face one another in a unification fight three months later in July.

Gómez, who had appeared on The Contender three years earlier, had pulled off a shocking upset the previous year when he knocked out future hall of famer Arturo Gatti, which dramatically raised his profile and led to him getting the title shot against Cotto. Gómez entered the bout as a sizeable 8–to–1 underdog, though he expressed confidence that he would beat Cotto claiming "I don't have the smallest doubt that I can knock out Cotto."

== Fight Details ==
Cotto would dominate Gómez throughout five rounds. Cotto set the tone in the first round when he staggered Gómez with a left hook to the body and then followed up a strong first round by scoring a flash knockdown after landing a body shot in the final minute of the second. Cotto continued to land punches almost at will in the third round and scored another knockdown with a body shot during the closing seconds of the round. Though clearly hurt by the blow, Gómez answered the referee's count after the round ended and continued the fight. Though Gómez managed to avoid being knocked down in the fourth round, Cotto continued to dominance, causing the ringside physician to notify Gómez that he would stop the fight after the fifth should he continue to take more punishment in the fifth. Gómez would attempt to fight more aggressively in the fifth, but was unable to land much sustained offense as Cotto continued to land big shots to Gómez's face, causing right eye to swell shut. Just before the final minute of the round, Cotto caught Gómez off balance with a jab to the face, sending him down for a third time, though Gómez again answered the count and finished the round. Following the end of the round, referee Randy Neumann consulted with the ringside physician, who, upon observing the damage to his face, stopped the fight, giving Cotto the victory via corner retirement.

== Fight card ==
Confirmed bouts:

Weight Class	Weight		vs.		Method	Round	Notes
Welterweight	147 lbs.	Miguel Cotto (c)	def.	Alfonso Gómez	RTD	5/12	^{note 1}
Welterweight	147 lbs.	Antonio Margarito	def.	Kermit Cintrón (c)	KO	6/12	^{note 2}
Featherweight	126 lbs.	Jesús Rojas	def.	Andres Ledesma	TKO	4/8
Featherweight	126 lbs.	Luis Cruz	def.	Olvin Mejia	UD	6
Super Middleweight	168 lbs.	Richard Pierson	def.	Angel David Gonzalez	UD	6
Super Middleweight	168 lbs.	Ronney Vargas	def.	Roberto Irrizarry	TKO	3/6
Super Middleweight	168 lbs.	Don Mouton	vs.	Omar Coffi	D	4

^Note 1 For WBA Welterweight Title
^Note 2 For IBF Welterweight Title

== Broadcasting ==
Country	Broadcaster
United Kingdom	Sky Sports
United States	HBO

Preceded by vs. Shane Mosley	Miguel Cotto's bouts 12 April 2008	Succeeded by vs. Antonio Margarito
Preceded by vs. Ben Tackie	Alfonso Gómez's bouts 12 April 2008	Succeeded by vs. Juan Manuel Buendia
