= José Santa Cruz (boxer) =

Mexican boxer

Personal information
- Born: José Armando Santa Cruz; August 29, 1980 (age 45) Michoacán, Mexico
- Height: 5 ft 10 in (178 cm)
- Weight: Lightweight

Boxing career
- Reach: 74 in (188 cm)
- Stance: Orthodox

Boxing record
- Total fights: 33
- Wins: 28
- Win by KO: 17
- Losses: 5

José Armando Santa Cruz (born August 29, 1980) is a Mexican former professional boxer. He is a former WBC interim lightweight champion, losing this title on August 12, 2006, to David Díaz. He is the brother of boxing star Léo Santa Cruz.

== Professional career ==
Jose turned professional in 2000, he won his pro debut by knocking out Penpak Chokchai. He would go on to compile a record of 22–1 before facing and defeating Japanese boxer Chikashi Inada, to win the interim WBC lightweight title. He would lose the title in his next fight to David Diaz.

== Professional boxing record ==
33 fights	28 wins	5 losses
By knockout	17	4
By decision	11	1

No.	Result	Record	Opponent	Type	Round, time	Date	Location	Notes
33	Loss	28–5	Zab Judah	TKO	3 (10)	2010-07-16	Prudential Center, Newark, New Jersey, U.S.	
32	Win	28–4	Anthony Mora	TKO	3 (8)	2009-12-05	Citizens Business Bank Arena, Ontario, California, U.S.	
31	Win	27–4	Sergio Macias	KO	3 (6)	2009-10-10	Nokia Theater, Los Angeles, California, U.S.	
30	Loss	26–4	Antonio Pitalúa	KO	6 (12)	2008-09-20	Arena Coliseo, Monterrey, Nuevo León, Mexico	
29	Win	26–3	Miguel Angel Munguia	KO	5 (8)	2008-07-23	Morongo Casino Resort & Spa, Cabazon, California, U.S.	
28	Loss	25–3	Joel Casamayor	SD	12 (12)	Nov 10, 2007	Madison Square Garden, New York City, New York, U.S.	For interim WBC lightweight title
27	Win	25–2	Dairo Esalas	TKO	2 (10)	2007-07-27	Desert Diamond Casinos, Tucson, Arizona, U.S.	
26	Win	24–2	Luis Arceo	UD	10 (10)	2007-01-05	Dickerson's Event Center, Las Cruces, New Mexico, U.S.	
25	Loss	23–2	David Díaz	TKO	10 (12)	2006-08-12	Thomas & Mack Center, Paradise, Nevada, U.S.	Lost interim WBC lightweight title
24	Win	23–1	Chikashi Inada	TKO	6 (12)	2006-05-20	Staples Center, Los Angeles, California, U.S.	Won interim WBC lightweight title
23	Win	22–1	Edner Cherry	UD	12 (12)	2006-02-04	Don Haskins Center, El Paso, Texas, U.S.	Retained NABF lightweight title
22	Win	21–1	Michael Lozada	TKO	4 (12)	2006-01-06	Santa Ana Star Casino Hotel, Bernalillo, New Mexico, U.S.	Won vacant NABF lightweight title
21	Loss	20–1	Fernando Trejo	TKO	10 (12)	2005-08-26	D & I Colonial Ballroom, Houston, Texas, U.S.	For NABF lightweight title
20	Win	20–0	Ernesto Zavala	TKO	4 (12)	2005-06-10	Aragon Ballroom, Chicago, Illinois, U.S.	
19	Win	19–0	Justin Juuko	TKO	3 (10)	2005-04-22	Cicero Stadium, Cicero, Illinois, U.S.	
18	Win	18–0	Lamar Murphy	SD	10 (10)	2004-10-14	ARCO Arena, Sacramento, California, U.S.	
17	Win	17–0	Noel Panescoro	TKO	1 (10)	2004-07-03	Korakuen Hall, Tokyo, Japan	
16	Win	16–0	James Crayton	UD	10 (10)	2004-05-13	Sports Arena, San Diego, California, U.S.	
15	Win	15–0	Arturo Morua	TKO	9 (10)	2003-11-21	Selland Arena, Fresno, California, U.S.	
14	Win	14–0	Roy Delgado	TKO	4 (6)	2003-08-15	Stodick Park, Gardnerville, Nevada, U.S.	
13	Win	13–0	Leobardo Roman	TKO	1 (4)	2003-06-02	DoubleTree Hotel, Ontario, California, U.S.	
12	Win	12–0	Alfonso Garcia	TKO	3 (6)	2003-05-28	Radisson Hotel, Sacramento, California, U.S.	
11	Win	11–0	Rogelio Castañeda Jr.	UD	8 (8)	2003-03-14	Feather Falls Casino, Oroville, California, U.S.	
10	Win	10–0	Sergio Soto	TKO	6 (8)	2002-12-13	Desert Diamond Casinos, Tucson, Arizona, U.S.	
9	Win	9–0	Jaime Ocegueda	TKO	2 (8)	2002-08-24	Sam's Town Hotel & Gambling Hall, Sunrise Manor, Nevada, U.S.	
8	Win	8–0	Justo Almazan	UD	4 (4)	2002-06-18	Thoroughbred Club, Del Mar, California, U.S.	
7	Win	7–0	Justo Sanchez	UD	6 (6)	2002-04-27	Arrowhead Pond, Anaheim, California, U.S.	
6	Win	6–0	Terry Evans	TKO	2 (4)	2001-10-13	Kid Gloves Gym, Simi Valley, California, U.S.	
5	Win	5–0	Terry Evans	UD	4 (4)	2001-05-11	Quiet Cannon, Montebello, California, U.S.	
4	Win	4–0	Adam Gonzalez	SD	6 (6)	2001-04-12	Centennial Garden Arena, Bakersfield, California, U.S.	
3	Win	3–0	Mark Burse	UD	6 (6)	2001-01-21	Peppermill Hotel & Casino, Reno, Nevada, U.S.	
2	Win	2–0	Carlos Alvarado	UD	6 (6)	2000-12-18	Los Angeles, California, U.S.	
1	Win	1–0	Penpak Chokchai	KO	1 (4)	2000-06-11	Los Angeles, California, U.S.	

== See also ==
- Notable boxing families

Sporting positions
Regional boxing titles
Vacant Title last held by Fernando Trejo	NABF lightweight champion January 6, 2006 – 2006; Vacated	Vacant Title next held by Edner Cherry
World boxing titles
New title	WBC lightweight champion Interim title May 20, 2006 – August 12, 2006	Succeeded by David Díaz
