= Edner Cherry =

Bahamian boxer

- Cherry in 2007

Personal information
- Nickname: Cherry Bomb
- Nationality: Bahamian
- Born: July 21, 1982 (age 43) Nassau, Bahamas
- Height: 5 ft 8 in (173 cm)
- Weight: Super featherweight Lightweight; Light welterweight

Boxing career
- Reach: 69 in (175 cm)
- Stance: Orthodox

Boxing record
- Total fights: 47
- Wins: 37
- Win by KO: 19
- Losses: 7
- Draws: 2
- No contests: 1

Edner Cherry (born July 21, 1982) is a Bahamian professional boxer and two-time world title challenger.

== Early years ==
Cherry was born to a Bahamian father and a Haitian mother. He emigrated from The Bahamas to the United States, and resides in Wauchula, Florida.

== Career ==
Cherry began boxing professionally in 2001, with mixed results (3-2-2 as of July 2002). Soon after signing with Peter Fernandez and Starfight Productions he appeared to find his groove, racking up 14 straight wins and acquiring a number of minor titles—the WBC Caribbean Boxing Federation Lightweight title and the NBA Intercontinental Lightweight Title. Cherry then lost an IBF title eliminator to Ricky Quiles by split decision to end his win streak. In February 2007 Cherry lost a unanimous decision to Paulie Malignaggi on HBO.

Recently, Edner Cherry has been named Friday Night Fights Boxer of the Year (2006) by ESPN and has fought on both Showtime and HBO.

In 2008, Cherry knocked out former WBC Lightweight champion Stevie Johnston in the 10th round. Cherry's 'Cherry Bomb' left hook had Johnston down in the third and the ninth, and a straight right hand put away the former champion for the count at 2:34 in the tenth round of a WBC USNBC national title bout. Following that fight, Cherry wound up fighting WBC light welterweight champion Timothy Bradley for the belt. Although very well prepared for this fight, Cherry dropped a unanimous decision to Bradley.

At the end of 2008, Cherry left his long-time trainer, Pete Fernandez and signed with TKO Promotions. Under TKO, Cherry has won three straight fights, all by stoppage. Cherry was scheduled to fight for the NABO super featherweight title, but after the original opponent pulled out of the fight, his management was unable to find a replacement. The fight was cancelled.

Cherry has also won the NABA and NABF lightweight titles.

In January 2012, Cherry signed a promotional deal with Chicago-based, 8 Count Promotions. He also signed an exclusive management deal with Albert Falcon and Patrick Doljanin of Warehouse Boxing, located in Highland Park, IL.

== Professional boxing record ==
47 fights	37 wins	7 losses
By knockout	19	0
By decision	18	7
Draws	2	
No contests	1	

No.	Result	Record	Opponent	Type	Round, time	Date	Location	Notes
47	Win	37–7–2 (1)	Dennis Galarza	UD	10	Apr 13, 2018	Minneapolis Armory, Minneapolis, Minnesota, US	
46	Win	36–7–2 (1)	Omar Douglas	UD	10	Apr 4, 2017	Sands Bethlehem Center, Bethlehem, Pennsylvania, US	
45	Win	35–7–2 (1)	Haskell Rhodes	UD	10	Jun 28, 2016	Sands Bethlehem Center, Bethlehem, Pennsylvania, US	
44	Loss	34–7–2 (1)	José Pedraza	SD	12	Oct 3, 2015	U.S. Bank Arena, Ohio, Cincinnati, US	For IBF super featherweight title
43	Win	34–6–2 (1)	Luis Cruz	KO	9 (10)	Jul 11, 2015	USF Sundome, Tampa, Florida, US	
42	Win	33–6–2 (1)	Osumanu Akba	TKO	2 (10)	Oct 18, 2014	2300 Arena, Philadelphia, Pennsylvania, US	
41	Win	32–6–2 (1)	Robert Osiobe	UD	8	Apr 4, 2014	Liacouras, Philadelphia, Pennsylvania, US	
40	Win	31–6–2 (1)	Vicente Escobedo	TKO	6 (10)	Feb 16, 2013	Boardwalk Hall, Atlantic City, New Jersey, US	
39	Win	30–6–2 (1)	Juan Carlos Martinez	MD	10	Apr 4, 2012	Cicero Stadium 1909 S. Laramie, Cicero, US	
38	Win	29–6–2 (1)	Guillermo Sanchez	UD	8	Feb 24, 2012	UIC Pavilio, Chicago, Illinois, US	
37	NC	28–6–2 (1)	Eric Aiken	NC	1 (10)	Sep 23, 2011	Seminole Hard Rock Hotel and Casino, Hollywood, US	
36	Win	28–6–2	Ever Luis Perez	TKO	2 (6)	Jan 8, 2011	Island Grove Park Exhibit Hall, Greely, US	
35	Win	27–6–2	Delvin Placencia	KO	2 (8)	Feb 27, 2010	Bell Auditorium, Auga, US	
34	Win	26–6–2	Hevinson Herrera	TKO	1 (8)	Feb 19, 2010	A La Carte Event Pavilion, Tampa, Florida US	
33	Win	25–6–2	Jovann Jones	TKO	3 (6)	Dec 17, 2009	Commerce Casino, Commerce, US	
32	Loss	24–6–2	Timothy Bradley	UD	12	Sep 13, 2008	Beau Rivage Resort & Casino, Biloxi, US	For WBC light welterweight title
31	Win	24–5–2	Stevie Johnston	KO	10 (10)	May 5, 2008	The Field House, Camp Lejuene, US	
30	Win	23–5–2	Wes Ferguson	TKO	6 (10)	Dec 8, 2007	MGM Grand, Grand Garden Arena, Las Vegas US	
29	Win	22–5–2	Wes Ferguson	UD	10	Jun 13, 2007	A La Carte Event Pavilion, Tampa, Florida, US	
28	Loss	21–5–2	Paulie Malignaggi	UD	10	Feb 17, 2007	Hammerstein Ballroom, New York, US	
27	Win	21–4–2	Daniel Alicea	TKO	12 (12)	Aug 11, 2006	Mountaineer Casino Racetrack and Resort, Chester, US	Won vacant NABF Lightweight title
26	Win	20–4–2	Monty Meza Clay	TKO	11 (12)	May 12, 2006	A La Carte Event Pavilion, Tampa US	
25	Loss	19–4–2	José Santa Cruz	UD	12	Feb 4, 2006	Don Haskins Convention Center, El Paso	
24	Win	19–3–2	Marco Angel Perez	KO	1 (12)	Jan 13, 2006	A La Carte Event Pavilion, Tampa, Florida, US	
23	Win	18–3–2	Juan Polo Perez	UD	8	May 13, 2005	A La Carte Event Pavilion, Tampa, Florida, US	
22	Loss	17–3–2	Ricky Quiles	SD	12	Feb 4, 2005	Seminole Hard Rock Hotel and Casino, Hollywood, US	
21	Win	17–2–2	Jamie Rangel	MD	12	Oct 22, 2004	A La Carte Event Pavilion, Tampa, Florida, US	
20	Win	16–2–2	Antonio Ramirez	TKO	5 (10)	Jul 27, 2004	A La Carte Event Pavilion, Tampa, Florida, US	
19	Win	15–2–2	Juan Gomez	KO	8 (12)	Apr 23, 2004	Coliseo Guillermo Angulo, Carolina, PR	
18	Win	14–2–2	Isidro Tejedor	UD	10	Mar 26, 2004	A La Carte Event Pavilion, Tampa, Florida, US	
17	Win	13–2–2	Marty Robbins	UD	10	Jan 23, 2004	A La Carte Event Pavilion, Tampa, Florida, US	
16	Win	12–2–2	Jadschi Green	TKO	1 (8)	Nov 14, 2003	A La Carte Event Pavilion, Tampa, Florida, US	
15	Win	11–2–2	Reggie Sanders	UD	8	Sep 12, 2003	A La Carte Event Pavilion, Tampa, Florida, US	
14	Win	10–2–2	Rashaan Abdul Blackburn	UD	6	Jun 6, 2003	A La Carte Event Pavilion, Tampa, Florida, US	
13	Win	9–2–2	Mauricio Juilio	UD	8	Mar 23, 2003	Convention Center, Coconut Grove, US	
12	Win	8–2–2	Antonio Davis	TKO	2 (4)	Feb 1, 2003	Jarrell's Gym, Savannah, US	
11	Win	7–2–2	Jaime Palma	UD	6	Jan 17, 2003	A La Carte Event Pavilion, Tampa, Florida, US	
10	Win	6–2–2	Carmelo Ramos	TKO	2 (4)	Dec 20, 2002	American Airlines Arena, Miami, Florida, US	
9	Win	5–2–2	Francisco Ginorio	TKO	2 (6)	Sep 21, 2002	A La Carte Event Pavilion, Tampa, Florida, US	
8	Win	4–2–2	Meacher Major	SD	4	Aug 9, 2002	A La Carte Event Pavilion, Tampa, Florida, US	
7	Loss	3–2–2	Rafael Sierra	SD	4	Jun 15, 2002	Miccosukee Indian Gaming Resort, Miami, Florida, US	
6	Win	3–1–2	Vinnie Pezzulo	UD	4	Apr 19, 2002	USF Sundome, Tampa, US	
5	Draw	2–1–2	Rafael Sierra	PTS	4	Feb 22, 2002	Miccosukee Indian Gaming Resort, Miami, US	
4	Win	2–1–1	Javier Gonzalez	TKO	3 (4)	Feb 15, 2002	Hyatt Regency, Tampa, US	
3	Loss	1–1–1	Jose Leonardo Cruz	MD	4	Jun 2, 2001	Miccosukee Indian Gaming Resort, Miami, US	
2	Draw	1–0–1	Mirko Wolf	PTS	4	May 11, 2001	Civic Center, Savannah, US	
1	Win	1–0	Joe Johnson	UD	4	Apr 7, 2001	Hyatt Regency, Tampa, US	
