= Robert West (boxer) =

American boxer

Robert West (born March 31, 1967, in Youngstown, Ohio) is a professional boxer in the Middleweight division.

== Pro career ==
In his pro debut Maurice upset the undefeated Scott Dailey by a four-round decision.

In his first effort at a championship title he would lose a twelve-round decision to undefeated champion James Coker in Freeman Coliseum, San Antonio, Texas.

On March 30, 2001, Brantley knocked out by three-time World Champion, American Antonio Margarito and the bout was the co-main event on an ESPN fight card.
