= Jaime Manuel Gómez =

American boxer

Jaime Manuel Gomez (born June 27, 1972 in Laredo, Texas) is an American-born Mexican professional boxer in the Light Middleweight division.

== Pro career ==
=== IBF lightweight Championship ===
In July 2000, Jaime Manuel lost to IBF Lightweight Champion Shane Mosley.

His biggest win was an upset knockout of undefeated African Kofi Jantuah. He would then go to have a draw against Mexican Jesus Soto Karass.

=== WBO Welterweight Championship ===
On February 18, 2006 Gomez lost to the Antonio Margarito in Las Vegas, Nevada.
