= Óscar Díaz (Bolivian footballer) =

Bolivian footballer (born 1985)

Personal information
- Full name: Óscar Alberto Díaz Acosta
- Date of birth: 22 October 1985 (age 41)
- Place of birth: Tarija, Bolivia
- Height: 1.88 m (6 ft 2 in)
- Position: Forward

Team information
- Current team: Club Real Potosí
- Number: 25

Senior career*
Years	Team	Apps	(Gls)
2009	Municipal Real Mamoré		
2010	Club San José		
2011–2013	Club Blooming		
2013–2014	Club Aurora		
2014–2016	Club Jorge Wilstermann		
2016	Sport Boys Warnes		
2017	The Strongest		
2018	Universitario de Sucre		
2019	Royal Pari		
2019	Sport Boys Warnes		
2020–	Club Real Potosí		

International career
2015	Bolivia	1	(0)
- * Club domestic league appearances and goals

Óscar Díaz (born 22 October 1985) is a Bolivian football striker who currently plays for Club Real Potosí.
