= Antonio Margarito =

Mexican-American boxer (born 1978)

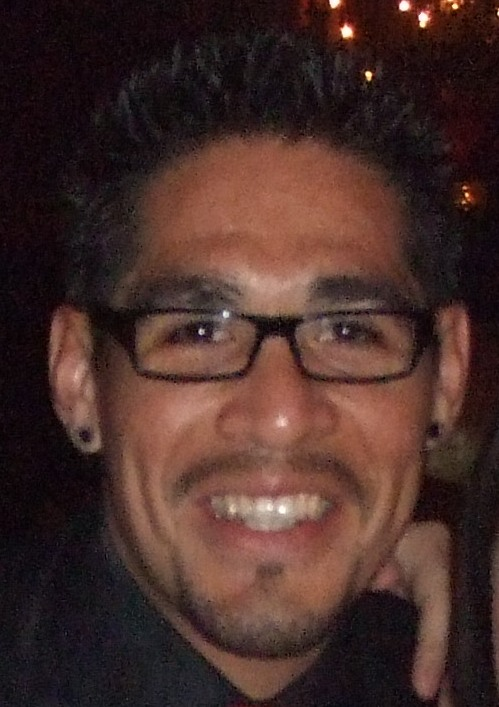
- Margarito in 2008

Personal information
- Nicknames: Tony; El Tornado de Tijuana ("The Tijuana Tornado")
- Born: Antonio Margarito Montiel; March 18, 1978 (age 48) Torrance, California, U.S.
- Height: 5 ft 11 in (180 cm)
- Weight: Welterweight; Light middleweight

Boxing career
- Reach: 72 in (183 cm)
- Stance: Orthodox

Boxing record
- Total fights: 50
- Wins: 41
- Win by KO: 27
- Losses: 8
- No contests: 1

Antonio Margarito Montiel (born March 18, 1978) is a Mexican American former professional boxer who competed between 1994 and 2017. He held multiple welterweight world championships, including the WBO title from 2002 to 2007, the IBF title in 2008, and the WBA (Super) title from 2008 to 2009. He also challenged three times for a light middleweight world title between 2004 and 2011. Nicknamed El Tornado de Tijuana ("The Tijuana Tornado"), Margarito was known for his aggressive pressure fighting style and exceptionally durable chin. He is also known for cheating by putting plaster in his gloves for which he was banned for 1 year.

In 2009, just before his fight with Shane Mosley, Margarito was involved in an incident where he was caught with illegal hand wraps containing gypsum (calcium sulfate) which, when combined with moisture, forms plaster of Paris. His signature stoppage victory over Miguel Cotto in 2008 was subsequently called into question. Following consecutive losses to Manny Pacquiao (a fight in which Margarito sustained career-changing eye damage) and a rematch against Cotto, Margarito retired from boxing in 2012 but returned for three more fights between 2016 and 2017.

== Early life and amateur career ==
Margarito was born in Torrance, California. From the age of two, he grew up in Tijuana, Mexico, where he and his brother spent a lot of time in a neighborhood boxing gym.

He compiled a record of 18–3 in his relatively brief amateur career, indicating that he may have turned pro quickly due to financial concerns (which he himself confirmed on his personal television segment on HBO: Ring Life: Antonio Margarito).

== Professional career ==
=== Welterweight ===
Margarito made his debut at the age of 15, beating Jose Trujillo in Tijuana by decision. On April 25 he achieved his first knockout, defeating Victor Angulo in the second round. On October 17 he suffered his first defeat, a six-round decision to Victor Lozoya. Over the next six bouts, he went 4–2. Following that, his financial situation dramatically improved (which is what he was trying to achieve early on in his career) and from there he went 28–2–1, with notable wins over Alfred Ankamah, Juan Soberanes, future World Middleweight Champion Sergio Martínez, Buck Smith, David Kamau and Frankie Randall, a former World Light Welterweight Champion who became the first man to beat Julio César Chávez in 91 fights.

=== First world title fight ===
On July 21, 2001, he got his first world title try against southpaw Daniel Santos for the WBO Welterweight title at Bayamón, Puerto Rico's Rubén Rodríguez Coliseum. The fight had to be stopped in the first round as a consequence of a clash of heads that opened deep gashes on both fighters and sent them both to a nearby hospital. Because the fight had not gone at least four rounds, a technical decision could not be awarded. The bout was declared a no contest and Santos retained the belt.

=== WBO welterweight champion ===
Santos then vacated the WBO title to go up in weight and pursue the WBO Light Middleweight Championship and Margarito was assigned to fight Antonio Díaz for the vacant title in front of an HBO Boxing audience. On March 16, 2002, Margarito crowned himself world champion, beating Diaz by knockout in round ten. He defended that crown with a decision in twelve over Danny Perez Ramírez and a knockout in two over former WBA title holder Andrew Lewis. Lewis was a southpaw and a hard puncher, but had been exposed as having a weak chin, while Margarito proved that he has a world class chin. He publicly asked for a unification bout with then WBC and WBA Champion Ricardo Mayorga.

At this point, Margarito considered going up in weight to try to lure Fernando Vargas, Oscar De La Hoya or Shane Mosley into a lucrative fight, or Santos into a rematch at the light middleweight division. On October 17, 2003, Margarito made his light middleweight division debut with a two-round knockout win over Maurice Brantley in Phoenix, Arizona.

On January 31, 2004, back in the welterweight division, he retained his title with a second-round knockout of Canada's previously undefeated Hercules Kyvelos.

Margarito faced Daniel Santos in a rematch on September 11 of the same year at the José Miguel Agrelot Coliseum in San Juan for Santos' WBO Light Middleweight title. The rematch also ended because of a headbutt, but this time, as the fight had already reached the four rounds mark needed for fights like these to be decided by judges, Margarito lost by a split ten round technical decision. He was down on two scorecards when the fight was stopped.

On April 23, 2005, Margarito retained his WBO welterweight title against another Puerto Rican, undefeated world class puncher Kermit Cintron, dropping him four times on his way to a fifth-round knockout (this fight was televised by ESPN Pay-Per-View Boxing). This was regarded as one of his best wins.

After almost a ten-month layoff, Margarito returned to the boxing ring on February 18, 2006, retaining his title with a first-round knockout of Jaime Manuel Gomez, who had lasted eleven rounds with Mosley for the IBF Lightweight title eight and a half years before.

On December 2, 2006, Margarito defeated future champion Joshua Clottey by a twelve-round unanimous decision. Margarito set a Compubox all-time record of 1,675 total punches thrown in a twelve-round bout. In the aftermath of the fight, it was revealed that Margarito had injured his ankle a week before the fight, but went on to fight regardless of the injury.

=== Losing and regaining the WBO welterweight title ===
On July 14, 2007, Margarito lost a 12-round unanimous decision to undefeated challenger Paul Williams, losing his WBO belt. After the bout, Margarito heavily disputed the decision, claiming that he had landed the most meaningful punches. Williams, however, landed the most punches (outhitting Margarito by almost a 2–1 ratio and throwing an average of over 100 punches per round) according to compubox.

On April 12, 2008, Margarito engaged in a rematch with Cintron, who had won the IBF Welterweight title belt following his loss to Margarito in 2005. In the early rounds, Cintron struck Margarito with several flush power shots to the head, but Margarito remained unhurt and continued to execute a game plan of continuously moving forward and pressuring Cintron. In the sixth round, Margarito landed a liver shot, knocking Cintron out and taking the IBF title. As the referee counted Cintron out, HBO cameras captured Margarito from a neutral corner, gesturing upward with his arms and urging Cintron to get up so that the two men could continue fighting.

=== Margarito vs. Cotto ===
Following his successful rematch with Cintron, the IBF ordered him to fight a mandatory defense against the organization's number-one contender, Joshua Clottey, whom Margarito had previously defeated in 2006. Rather than agreeing to a rematch with Clottey, Margarito vacated the IBF title and agreed to a fight with undefeated WBA Welterweight Champion Miguel Cotto of Puerto Rico. The Cotto-Margarito match took place on July 26, 2008, in Las Vegas.

Margarito won in the 11th round via technical knockout. Margarito had lost almost all the early rounds, but he came back with relentless pace, eventually winning in the 11th round, in what was lauded as one of the best fights of the year. At the time of the stoppage, Margarito was ahead by two rounds on two judges' scorecards, with one judge having it even. Prior to his fight with Shane Mosley, Margarito had a record of 37 wins, 5 losses and 1 no contest, with 27 wins by knockout.

=== Margarito vs. Mosley ===
Margarito fought Shane Mosley on January 24, 2009, at the Staples Center in Los Angeles to defend his WBA title and for the vacant Lineal Welterweight Championship of Lineal Champs and Cyber Boxing Zone (CBZ). The Ring did not recognize this bout for its vacant Welterweight Championship despite the fact it pitted The Ring #1 ranked welterweight, Antonio Margarito, vs. The Ring #3 ranked welterweight, Shane Mosley. Coming in the bout, Margarito had just stopped the previous The Ring #1 ranked welterweight and current The Ring #2 ranked welterweight, Miguel Cotto. In the fight, Margarito was battered and outclassed by Mosley and lost the fight and his WBA title by 9th-round technical knockout.

After the knockout loss, Margarito said he was weight-drained during the fight, and was also suffering from dehydration and back problems.

=== Margarito vs. García ===
Margarito was scheduled to return to the ring on March 13, 2010, against Carson Jones, pending his relicensing, on the Pacquiao-Clottey undercard. But for reasons unspecified, promoter Top Rank announced he would not return. Margarito expressed interest in fighting Filipino boxer Manny Pacquiao if the latter's bout with Floyd Mayweather Jr. did not materialize.

His comeback fight was postponed until May 8 and was held at Aguascalientes, Mexico, where he faced light middleweight contender Roberto García (28–2). Margarito won a ten-round unanimous decision over García to capture the vacant WBC International Light Middleweight title. The judges' score cards were 99–89, 100–88 and 99–90, all in favor of Margarito.

Margarito knocked García down in the first round, the first time García was knocked down in his boxing career.

=== Margarito vs. Pacquiao ===
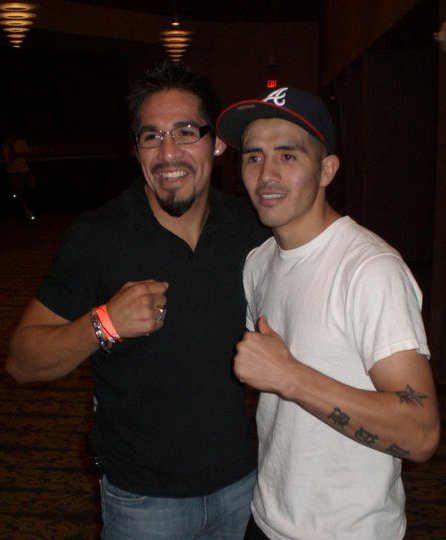
Margarito (left) with Brandon Ríos, 2011

On July 23, 2010, Bob Arum announced that Margarito would face Manny Pacquiao for the WBC Light Middleweight championship that was vacated by then Middleweight champion Sergio Martínez. The fight took place on Saturday, November 13, 2010, in Cowboys Stadium in Arlington, Texas, as Margarito had a licence to box in Texas. In his camp for this fight, Margarito had four southpaw sparring partners: Karim Martínez, Cleotis Pendarvis, number one mandatory for the WBA Light Middleweight title, Austin Trout, and U.S. Olympic silver medalist Ricardo Williams. Five weeks before the fight, Margarito and Lightweight boxer Brandon Ríos were interviewed by Elie Seckbach and the video taken showed both of them (Margarito and Ríos) mocking Manny Pacquiao's trainer Freddie Roach who has Parkinson's disease. On the Thursday before the fight, Margarito publicly apologized to Roach and to everyone suffering from Parkinson's. Margarito had a 17-pound weight advantage (weighing 165 to Pacquiao's 148), a 5.5 inch height advantage, and a six-inch reach advantage. Despite this, he was dominated by Pacquiao and endured a savage, brutal, relentless beating for 12 rounds, and suffered serious eye damage. On the fourth episode of HBO reality show 24/7, it was observed that one week before the fight, Margarito weighed in at 154 lbs with the fight scheduled at a catchweight of 150 lbs. The fight wound up being a unanimous decision loss for Margarito, with the judges' scorecards being 120–108, 119–109, and 118–108. Margarito was taken to the hospital directly after the fight where it was discovered that his left orbital bone had been fractured. Surgery had to be postponed to two days later as his face was too swollen to operate on.

=== Margarito vs. Cotto II ===
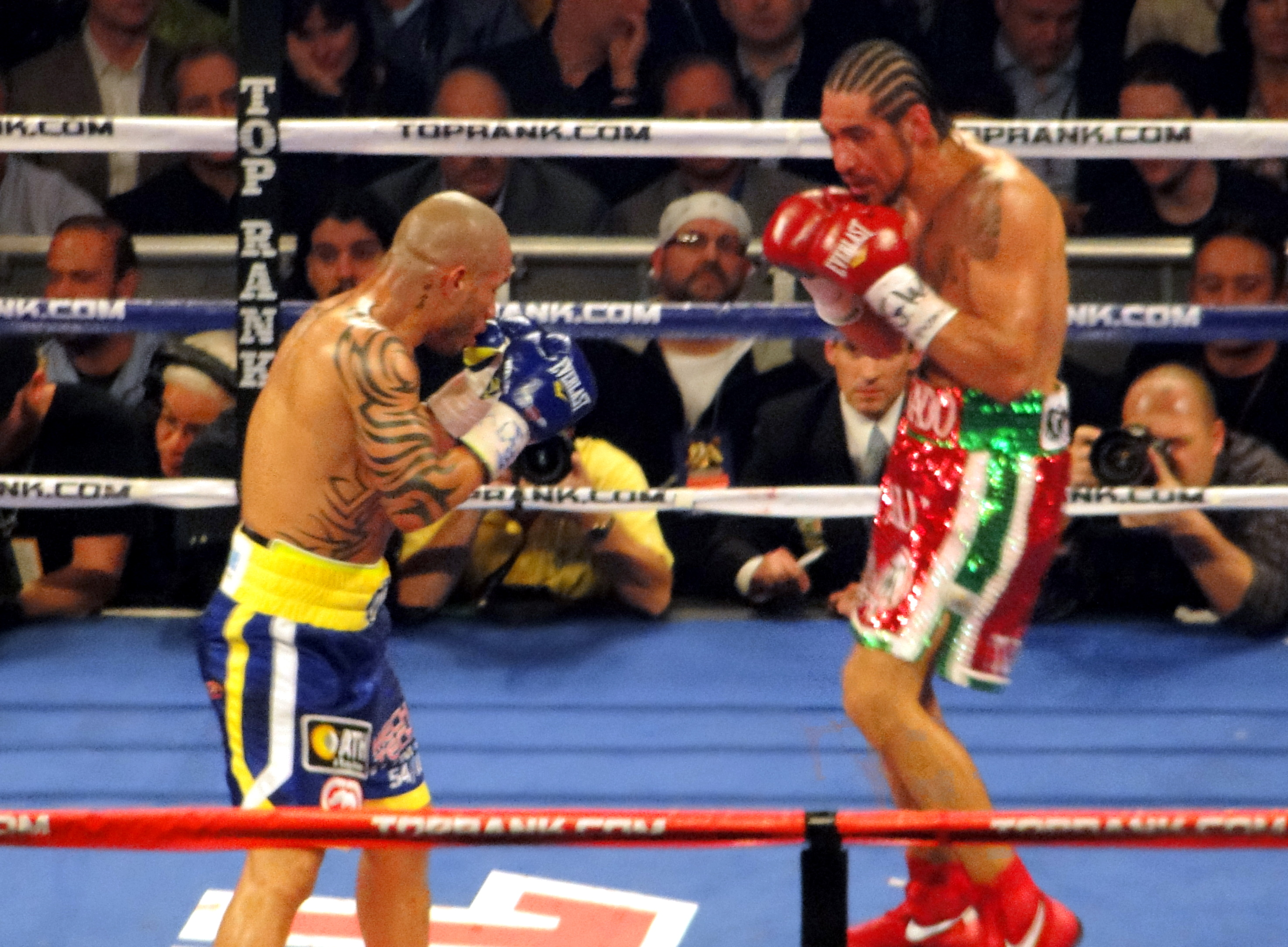
Margarito (right) vs. Miguel Cotto, 2011

On December 3, 2011, Margarito was defeated by Miguel Cotto via TKO by doctor stoppage in the 10th round. The fight was stopped at the start of the 10th round because of the condition of Margarito's right eye, which was swollen shut. This was the same eye that was badly damaged in his previous fight with Manny Pacquiao and the one that almost kept the New York State Athletic Commission from granting him his boxing license because of the special procedure that was performed on it in 2010. Margarito retired following this fight.

=== Comeback ===
Margarito came out of retirement in 2016, winning two bouts that year. He faced Carson Jones on September 2, 2017, winning a slugfest by seventh-round technical decision after a cut opened up on Margarito's eye in the early rounds.

== Tampered handwraps controversy ==
Before Margarito vs. Mosley, Mosley's trainer, Naazim Richardson, observed that Margarito had a pasty white substance in his handwraps. One doctor described this material as plaster hidden in the wrapped hands of Margarito, leading to accusations that he may have been trying to cheat. At Richardson's insistence, California State Inspector Dean Lohuis called for Margarito's hands to be rewrapped. According to Judd Burstein, the attorney for Mosley, Margarito had wet pads in the wrapping. Mosley's doctor, Robert Olvera, likened the material to the type of plaster used to make casts. Burstein said he seized the pad removed from the wrapping and another pad found in Margarito's dressing room. Both were placed in a sealed box that was given to Lohuis for further study. The California Department of Justice laboratory later confirmed the substance to be similar in nature to plaster of Paris.

In late January the California State Athletic Commission suspended Margarito and his trainer, Javier Capetillo, pending investigation. At the hearing, Margarito claimed he did not know what was in the wraps, while Capetillo admitted to making "a big mistake" by placing the wrong inserts into Margarito's hand wraps. The commission voted unanimously to revoke Margarito and Capetillo's licenses for at least one year. While it found Margarito did not know about the gloves, it took the line that as head of the team, he was responsible for Capetillo's actions.

Since state boxing commissions generally honor suspensions imposed in other states, this action effectively banned Margarito from boxing in the United States.

In November 2009, it emerged that red stains on the hand wraps Margarito used in the Cotto fight were similar to the stains on the inserts seized before the Mosley fight. This has raised suspicions that Margarito's gloves were loaded for that fight and possibly others as well.

== Personal life ==
Margarito resides in Los Angeles, California, with his wife Lorena, whom he married after his first marriage. He was first married to his childhood sweetheart Michelle in 1999, which shortly came to an end.

== Professional boxing record ==
50 fights	41 wins	8 losses
By knockout	27	2
By decision	14	6
No contests	1	

No.	Result	Record	Opponent	Type	Round, time	Date	Location	Notes
50	Win	41–8 (1)	Carson Jones	TD	7 (10), 3:00	Sep 2, 2017	Gimnasio Manuel Bernardo Aguirre, Chihuahua City, Mexico	Unanimous TD: Margarito cut from an accidental head clash
49	Win	40–8 (1)	Ramón Álvarez	SD	10	Aug 13, 2016	Baja California Center, Rosarito Beach, Mexico	Won vacant WBO–NABO light middleweight title
48	Win	39–8 (1)	Jorge Páez Jr.	UD	10	Mar 5, 2016	Mexico City Arena, Mexico City, Mexico	
47	Loss	38–8 (1)	Miguel Cotto	TKO	9 (12), 3:00	Dec 3, 2011	Madison Square Garden, New York City, New York, U.S.	For WBA (Super) light middleweight title
46	Loss	38–7 (1)	Manny Pacquiao	UD	12	Nov 13, 2010	Cowboys Stadium, Arlington, Texas, U.S.	For vacant WBC light middleweight title
45	Win	38–6 (1)	Roberto García	UD	10	May 8, 2010	Plaza de Toros Monumental, Aguascalientes City, Mexico	Won vacant WBC International light middleweight title
44	Loss	37–6 (1)	Shane Mosley	TKO	9 (12), 0:43	Jan 24, 2009	Staples Center, Los Angeles, California, U.S.	Lost WBA (Super) welterweight title
43	Win	37–5 (1)	Miguel Cotto	TKO	11 (12), 2:05	Jul 26, 2008	MGM Grand Garden Arena, Paradise, Nevada, U.S.	Won WBA welterweight title
42	Win	36–5 (1)	Kermit Cintrón	KO	6 (12), 1:57	Apr 12, 2008	Boardwalk Hall, Atlantic City, New Jersey, U.S.	Won IBF welterweight title
41	Win	35–5 (1)	Golden Johnson	TKO	1 (12), 2:28	Nov 10, 2007	Madison Square Garden, New York City, New York, U.S.	Won vacant WBO Inter-Continental welterweight title
40	Loss	34–5 (1)	Paul Williams	UD	12	Jul 14, 2007	Home Depot Center, Carson, California, U.S.	Lost WBO welterweight title
39	Win	34–4 (1)	Joshua Clottey	UD	12	Dec 2, 2006	Boardwalk Hall, Atlantic City, New Jersey, U.S.	Retained WBO welterweight title
38	Win	33–4 (1)	Jaime Manuel Gómez	TKO	1 (12), 1:14	Feb 18, 2006	The New Aladdin, Paradise, Nevada, U.S.	Retained WBO welterweight title
37	Win	32–4 (1)	Kermit Cintrón	TKO	5 (12), 2:12	Apr 23, 2005	Caesars Palace, Paradise, Nevada, U.S.	Retained WBO welterweight title
36	Win	31–4 (1)	Sebastián Luján	TKO	10 (12), 2:57	Feb 18, 2005	Boardwalk Hall, Atlantic City, New Jersey, U.S.	Retained WBO welterweight title
35	Loss	30–4 (1)	Daniel Santos	TD	10 (12)	Sep 11, 2004	José Miguel Agrelot Coliseum, San Juan, Puerto Rico	For WBO light middleweight title; Split TD: Margarito cut from an accidental head clash
34	Win	30–3 (1)	Hercules Kyvelos	TKO	2 (12), 0:54	Jan 31, 2004	Dodge Theatre, Phoenix, Arizona, U.S.	Retained WBO welterweight title
33	Win	29–3 (1)	Maurice Brantley	TKO	2 (10), 2:47	Oct 17, 2003	Celebrity Theatre, Phoenix, Arizona, U.S.	
32	Win	28–3 (1)	Andrew Lewis	TKO	2 (12), 2:31	Feb 8, 2003	Mandalay Bay Events Center, Paradise, Nevada, U.S.	Retained WBO welterweight title
31	Win	27–3 (1)	Danny Perez Ramírez	UD	12	Oct 12, 2002	Arrowhead Pond, Anaheim, California, U.S.	Retained WBO welterweight title
30	Win	26–3 (1)	Antonio Díaz	TKO	10 (12), 2:17	Mar 16, 2002	Bally's Las Vegas, Paradise, Nevada, U.S.	Won vacant WBO welterweight title
29	NC	25–3 (1)	Daniel Santos	NC	1 (12), 2:11	Jul 21, 2001	Coliseo Rubén Rodríguez, Bayamón, Puerto Rico	WBO welterweight title at stake; Margarito cut from an accidental head clash
28	Win	25–3	Robert West	KO	1 (10), 2:19	Mar 30, 2001	Convention Center, Fort Worth, Texas, U.S.	
27	Win	24–3	Frankie Randall	RTD	4 (10), 3:00	Dec 10, 2000	Shrine Building, Memphis, Tennessee, U.S.	
26	Win	23–3	José Luis Benítez	TKO	1 (10), 1:06	Sep 17, 2000	El Gran Mercado, Phoenix, Arizona, U.S.	
25	Win	22–3	David Kamau	TKO	2 (10)	Jun 16, 2000	Fantasy Springs Resort Casino, Indio, California, U.S.	Won WBO–NABO welterweight title
24	Win	21–3	Sergio Martínez	TKO	7 (10), 2:57	Feb 19, 2000	Mandalay Bay Events Center, Paradise, Nevada, U.S.	
23	Win	20–3	Efrain Munoz	KO	2 (10)	Dec 15, 1999	Quiet Cannon, Montebello, California, U.S.	
22	Win	19–3	Buck Smith	TKO	5 (8)	Oct 23, 1999	Will Rogers Memorial Center, Fort Worth, Texas, U.S.	
21	Win	18–3	Danny Perez	SD	8	Jun 12, 1999	Fantasy Springs Resort Casino, Indio, California, U.S.	
20	Win	17–3	Daniel Mendez	KO	3	Jun 7, 1999	Auditorio Municipal, Tijuana, Mexico	
19	Win	16–3	Reyes Estrada	KO	2	Dec 4, 1998	Auditorio Municipal, Tijuana, Mexico	
18	Win	15–3	Javier Francisco Mendez	KO	10	Jun 27, 1998	Fantasy Springs Resort Casino, Indio, California, U.S.	
17	Win	14–3	Miguel González	UD	8	Apr 24, 1998	Scottish Rite Event Center, San Diego, California, U.S.	
16	Win	13–3	Cesar Valdez	TKO	5 (10), 0:42	Nov 29, 1997	The Orleans, Paradise, Nevada, U.S.	
15	Win	12–3	Horatio Garcia	UD	10	Jun 26, 1997	Reseda Country Club, Los Angeles, California, U.S.	
14	Win	11–3	Juan Soberanes	UD	10	Dec 2, 1996	Arrowhead Pond, Anaheim, California, U.S.	
13	Win	10–3	Alfred Ankamah	KO	4 (10), 2:59	Oct 14, 1996	Arrowhead Pond, Anaheim, California, U.S.	
12	Loss	9–3	Rodney Jones	UD	10	Jun 28, 1996	Culver City, California, U.S.	
11	Win	9–2	Juan Yoani Cervantes	KO	4 (8)	Apr 18, 1996	Grand Olympic Auditorium, Los Angeles, California, U.S.	
10	Loss	8–2	Larry Dixon	UD	10	Feb 26, 1996	Tijuana, Mexico	
9	Win	8–1	Antonio Ojeda	KO	4	Sep 10, 1995	Tijuana, Mexico	
8	Win	7–1	Carlos Palafox	PTS	4	Mar 18, 1995	Tijuana, Mexico	
7	Win	6–1	Efrain Munoz	PTS	4	Jan 26, 1995	Tijuana, Mexico	
6	Loss	5–1	Victor Lozoya	PTS	6	Oct 17, 1994	Tijuana, Mexico	
5	Win	5–0	Francisco Lopez	TKO	3 (4)	Aug 5, 1994	Ensenada, Mexico	
4	Win	4–0	Cesar Roland	KO	1 (4)	Jun 27, 1994	Tijuana, Mexico	
3	Win	3–0	Victor Angulo	TKO	4 (4)	Apr 25, 1994	Tijuana, Mexico	
2	Win	2–0	Gilberto Plata	UD	4	Jan 21, 1994	Tijuana, Mexico	
1	Win	1–0	Jose Trujillo	UD	4	Jan 14, 1994	Tijuana, Mexico	

== See also ==
- Notable boxing families
- List of welterweight boxing champions
- List of WBA champions
- List of IBF champions
- List of WBO champions
- List of Mexican boxing world champions

Sporting positions
Regional boxing titles
Preceded by David Kamau	WBO–NABO welterweight champion June 16, 2000 – September 2000; Vacated	Vacant Title next held by Cory Spinks
Vacant Title last held by Euri González	WBO Inter-Continental welterweight champion November 10, 2007 – April 2008; Vacated	Vacant Title next held by Christian Bladt
Vacant Title last held by Sherzod Husanov	WBC International light middleweight champion May 8, 2010 – November 13, 2010; Lost bid for world title	Vacant Title next held by Emanuele Della Rosa
Vacant Title last held by Michel Soro	WBO–NABO light middleweight champion August 13, 2016 – May 2017; Vacated	Vacant Title next held by Kanat Islam
World boxing titles
Vacant Title last held by Daniel Santos	WBO welterweight champion March 16, 2002 – July 14, 2007	Succeeded by Paul Williams
Preceded by Kermit Cintrón	IBF welterweight champion April 12, 2008 – May 23, 2008; Vacated	Vacant Title next held by Joshua Clottey
Preceded by Miguel Cotto	WBA welterweight champion July 26 – October 3, 2008; Promoted	Succeeded by Yuriy Nuzhnenko as Regular champion
Vacant Title last held by Zab Judah	WBA welterweight champion Super title October 3, 2008 – January 24, 2009	Succeeded by Shane Mosley
