= David Kamau =

Kenyan boxer (born 1965)

Personal information
- Nickname: The KO
- Nationality: Kenyan
- Born: David Nganga Kamau; August 4, 1965 (age 61)
- Height: 5 ft 11 in (180 cm)
- Weight: Light Middleweight; Welterweight; Light Welterweight

Boxing career
- Reach: 69 in (175 cm)
- Stance: Orthodox

Boxing record
- Total fights: 34
- Wins: 30
- Win by KO: 22
- Losses: 4

David Nganga Kamau (born August 4, 1965, in Nakuru, Kenya) is a former Kenyan professional boxer in the Light Middleweight division who lost only four times in 34 fights. Two of his professional losses were in world championship fights.

== Amateur career ==
Kamau represented Kenya at the 1988 Summer Olympics in the light-welterweight category, losing his third fight to Sodnomdarjaagiin Altansükh of Mongolia. Previously in the competition, Kamau defeated Abidnasir Shahab of Jordan and Martin Ndongo-Ebanga of Cameroon.

== Pro career ==
He was once trained by Alberto Davila, the former bantamweight champion of the world.

=== WBC Light Welterweight Championship ===
The undefeated African lost his first shot at the title to three-division World Champion, Mexican Julio César Chávez.

=== WBC Welterweight Championship ===
In his second effort at a World Championship he would not fare better, getting knocked out by four division World Champion, Mexican-American Oscar De La Hoya. In February 1999, he lost to American Danny Perez Ramírez.

==== WBO NABO Welterweight Championship ====
On June 16, 2000, Kamau lost to three-time world champion, American Antonio Margarito in Fantasy Springs Casino, Indio, California.
