= Julio César García =

Mexican boxer

Personal information
- Nickname: Baby Face
- Nationality: Mexican
- Born: 21 April 1987 (age 39) Ciudad Acuña, Coahuila
- Height: 6 ft 1 in (186 cm)
- Weight: Middleweight

Boxing career
- Reach: 74 in (189 cm)
- Stance: Orthodox

Boxing record
- Total fights: 45
- Wins: 41
- Win by KO: 35
- Losses: 4
- Draws: 0
- No contests: 0

Julio César García (born 21 April 1987) is a Mexican former professional boxer who competed from 2002 to 2013, winning the WBC FECARBOX super featherweight title in 2004. His promoter was Roberto Durán.

== Professional career ==
García turned pro five days after turning 15 against Héctor Salazar. García won the WBC FECARBOX super featherweight title, the Mexican super featherweight title, WBA Continental light welterweight title, and the WBC Youth light welterweight title.

He knocked out Grover Wiley to capture the IBO Americas welterweight title and then his next bout was a victory against Alfonso Sanchez (20–5–1). It was the undercard for Evander Holyfield's "Best Damn Comeback Period" where Holyfield beat journeymen Jeremy Bates. In a fight with Troy Browning he was upset by undefeated 40-year-old, it was a very lackluster performance, losing by majority decision. The fight was aired on ESPN's Friday Night Fights, and the scores were 96–94, 97-93 and 95-95.

On 27 June 2008, Garcia returned to the middleweight ranks and with one punch he blew away Jose Medina (14–12, 10 KOs) in just 13 seconds of the first round on ESPN's Friday Night Fights. The fight was held at War Memorial Auditorium in Ft. Lauderdale, Florida. On 14 September 2008, super middleweight Danny Perez (33–5), 31, won a unanimous decision over Julio Cesar Garcia, 21, a late replacement for Yory Boy Campas.
