= Danny Perez Ramírez =

American boxer

Danny Perez
Personal information
- Nickname: Dynamite
- Nationality: American
- Born: January 4, 1977 (age 49) Ventura, California
- Height: 5 ft 11 in (180 cm)
- Weight: Middleweight; Light Middleweight; Welterweight

Boxing career
- Reach: 74 in (188 cm)
- Stance: Orthodox

Boxing record
- Total fights: 42
- Wins: 34
- Win by KO: 17
- Losses: 8
- Draws: 0
- No contests: 0

Danny Perez (born January 4, 1977) is a Mexican-American professional boxer. He's the former NABF Welterweight, USBA, and WBO NABO Light Middleweight. He holds wins over Julio César García, the 2006 winner of ESPN's The Contender Grady Brewer, and former IBA middleweight Champion Jose Luis Zertuche.

== Early life ==
Danny was born and raised in Ventura, California. He grew up with "Ferocious" Fernando Vargas, and current world champion trainer Robert Garcia. They were known as the "Three Amigos." He has family in Tecate, Mexico. As a teenager, his family moved to El Cajon, California.

== Professional career ==
In October 2004, Perez would go on to T.K.O. title contender Sam Garr in the second round, to win the NABF welterweight title in Fort Worth, Texas.

=== WBO Welterweight title ===
On October 12, 2006, Perez lost to WBO welterweight champion Antonio Margarito in Arrowhead Pond, Anaheim, California.

=== Legacy ===
Danny Perez has fought many great fighters like Antonio Margarito (twice), Jose Luis Zertuche, Julio César García, Craig McEwan, Erislandy Lara, Jesse Brinkley, Grady Brewer, Julio César García, David Lopez, Sam Garr, and David Kamau. He lost a highly controversial majority decision to Golden Boy fighter Mcewan. He was also a victim of a bad decision by the referee Vic Drakulich in the Brinkley fight. He clearly hit him with a great body shot that had him on the canvas. It was ruled a low blow, instead of a T.K.O for Perez. Afterwards, Drakulich admitted his mistake.

== See also ==
- List of NABF champions
