= David Díaz (boxer) =

American boxer

Personal information
- Nickname: Dangerous
- Born: June 7, 1976 (age 50) Chicago, Illinois, U.S.
- Height: 5 ft 6 in (168 cm)
- Weight: Lightweight; Light welterweight

Boxing career
- Reach: 69 in (175 cm)
- Stance: Southpaw

Boxing record
- Total fights: 41
- Wins: 36
- Win by KO: 17
- Losses: 4
- Draws: 1

David Díaz (born June 7, 1976) is an American former professional boxer who competed from 1996 to 2011, and held the WBC lightweight title from 2007 to 2008.

== Amateur highlights ==
- Member of the 1996 US Olympic Team as a Light Welterweight. His results were:
  - Defeated fan favorite Zab Judah (United States) twice within 8 days
  - Defeated Jacobo Garcia (Virgin Islands) RSC 3 (0:33)
  - Lost to Oktay Urkal (Germany) 6-14
- Won Chicago Golden Gloves four times and the National Golden Gloves three times (1993, 1994 and 1996 National Golden Gloves light welterweight champion)

== Professional career ==
Diaz accumulated an undefeated record of 26–0 before losing to Kendall Holt by TKO in the 8th round. He defeated José Armando Santa Cruz for the interim title on August 12, 2006. On February 20, 2007, Diaz was awarded the title when Joel Casamayor, the champion at the time, was stripped of the title for signing to fight a rematch against WBO champion Acelino Freitas rather than defend against him – it should nevertheless be noted however, that the lightweight title bout between old foes Casamayor and Freitas never took place because Freitas fought and lost his WBO title to WBA champion Juan Díaz instead.

Diaz defeated Mexican legend Erik Morales on August 4, 2007, by a controversial unanimous decision to defend his title. On June 28, 2008, Diaz lost his title to Manny Pacquiao in Las Vegas via 9th-round TKO earning Pacquiao his fifth world championship in five different weight divisions.

After a lay-off that saw Diaz out of the ring for over a year, he returned to face Jesús Chávez on September 26, 2009. He won the fight by majority decision.

On March 13, 2010, Diaz challenged Humberto Soto for his old WBC lightweight title, which had recently been vacated by Edwin Valero, on the undercard of Pacquiao's fight with Joshua Clottey. Soto defeated Diaz, dropping him in the opening and closing rounds, en route to a unanimous decision victory.

== Outside the ring ==
Diaz is involved with mentoring various youth. He is also active in the Mexican-American community of Chicago. In September 2013, he was the grand marshal of the 26th Street Mexican Independence Parade in the Pilsen neighborhood of Chicago. Earlier in that very same year on February 28, 2013, Diaz endorsed friend and former boxer Bill Evans as a candidate for Cook County Sheriff in 2014.

== Professional boxing record ==
41 fights	36 wins	4 losses
By knockout	17	3
By decision	19	1
Draws	1	

No.	Result	Record	Opponent	Type	Round, time	Date	Location	Notes
41	Loss	36–4–1	Hank Lundy	KO	6 (10), 0:37	Aug 19, 2011	The Venue at Horseshoe Casino, Hammond, Indiana, U.S.	For NABF lightweight title
40	Win	36–3–1	Robert Frankel	MD	10	Jan 28, 2011	UIC Pavilion, Chicago, Illinois, U.S.	
39	Loss	35–3–1	Humberto Soto	UD	12	Mar 13, 2010	Cowboys Stadium, Arlington, Texas, U.S.	For vacant WBC lightweight title
38	Win	35–2–1	Jesús Chávez	MD	10	Sep 26, 2009	UIC Pavilion, Chicago, Illinois, U.S.	
37	Loss	34–2–1	Manny Pacquiao	TKO	9 (12), 2:24	Jun 28, 2008	Mandalay Bay Events Center, Paradise, Nevada, U.S.	Lost WBC lightweight title
36	Win	34–1–1	Ramón Montaño	MD	10	Mar 15, 2008	Mandalay Bay Events Center, Paradise, Nevada, U.S.	
35	Win	33–1–1	Érik Morales	UD	12	Aug 4, 2007	Allstate Arena, Rosemont, Illinois, U.S.	Retained WBC lightweight title
34	Win	32–1–1	José Santa Cruz	TKO	10 (12), 2:26	Aug 12, 2006	Thomas & Mack Center, Paradise, Nevada, U.S.	Won WBC interim lightweight title
33	Win	31–1–1	Cristian Favela	UD	12	Jun 16, 2006	Cicero Stadium, Cicero, Illinois, U.S.	Retained IBA lightweight title
32	Win	30–1–1	Silverio Ortiz	UD	10	Mar 17, 2006	Aragon Ballroom, Chicago, Illinois, U.S.	
31	Draw	29–1–1	Ramaz Paliani	MD	12	Dec 10, 2005	Grand Victoria Casino & Resort, Rising Sun, Indiana, U.S.	Retained IBA lightweight title
30	Win	29–1	Juan Polo Perez	TKO	3 (12), 2:07	Oct 21, 2005	Savvis Center, St. Louis, Missouri, U.S.	Won vacant IBA lightweight title
29	Win	28–1	John Trigg	UD	4	Aug 20, 2005	Allstate Arena, Rosemont, Illinois, U.S.	
28	Win	27–1	Tyrone Wiggins	TKO	3 (8), 3:00	Jun 2, 2005	Family Arena, St. Charles, Missouri, U.S.	
27	Loss	26–1	Kendall Holt	TKO	8 (10), 2:26	Feb 4, 2005	Foxwoods Resort Casino, Ledyard, Connecticut, U.S.	
26	Win	26–0	Jaime Rangel	TKO	9 (10), 2:25	Dec 10, 2004	Aragon Ballroom, Chicago, Illinois, U.S.	
25	Win	25–0	Jaime Morales	UD	8	Jul 9, 2004	Star Plaza Theatre, Merrillville, Indiana, U.S.	
24	Win	24–0	Ener Julio	TKO	10 (10), 1:42	May 15, 2004	DePaul Athletic Center, Chicago, Illinois, U.S.	
23	Win	23–0	Emanuel Augustus	UD	8	Jan 30, 2004	DePaul Athletic Center, Chicago, Illinois, U.S.	
22	Win	22–0	Frankie Sanchez	UD	8	Dec 12, 2003	DePaul Athletic Center, Chicago, Illinois, U.S.	
21	Win	21–0	Juaquin Gallardo	UD	8	Sep 13, 2003	Pechanga Resort & Casino, Temecula, California, U.S.	
20	Win	20–0	Nelson Manchego	KO	1 (10)	Jul 18, 2003	DePaul Athletic Center, Chicago, Illinois, U.S.	
19	Win	19–0	Andre Baker	TKO	6 (6), 0:01	Jun 6, 2003	Park West, Chicago, Illinois, U.S.	
18	Win	18–0	Franco Ogentho	KO	1 (10), 2:59	Apr 11, 2003	DePaul Athletic Center, Chicago, Illinois, U.S.	
17	Win	17–0	Dillon Carew	TKO	3 (8)	Feb 7, 2003	DePaul Athletic Center, Chicago, Illinois, U.S.	
16	Win	16–0	Damone Wright	TKO	4 (6), 0:47	Dec 13, 2002	DePaul Athletic Center, Chicago, Illinois, U.S.	
15	Win	15–0	Clifton Woods	KO	2 (4), 1:32	Oct 17, 2002	Ambassador Club, St. Louis, Missouri, U.S.	
14	Win	14–0	Anthony Cobb	TKO	6 (6), 1:33	Sep 27, 2002	DePaul Athletic Center, Chicago, Illinois, U.S.	
13	Win	13–0	Steve Larrimore	TKO	2	Sep 8, 2000	Chicago, Illinois, U.S.	
12	Win	12–0	Mark Tang	TKO	3 (8), 1:31	Sep 9, 1999	Noa Noa West, Stone Park, Illinois, U.S.	
11	Win	11–0	Rafael Salas	TKO	4 (6), 0:54	Apr 21, 1999	Ramada Inn O'Hare International Airport, Rosemont, Illinois, U.S.	
10	Win	10–0	Adam Leibowitz	TKO	6	Feb 27, 1999	Miccosukee Resort & Gaming, Miami, Florida, U.S.	
9	Win	9–0	George Kellman	UD	6	Dec 19, 1998	Miccosukee Resort & Gaming, Miami, Florida, U.S.	
8	Win	8–0	Alberto Sepulveda	SD	6	May 5, 1998	Grand Casino, Biloxi, Mississippi, U.S.	
7	Win	7–0	Theon Holland	TKO	4	Mar 14, 1998	Etess Arena, Atlantic City, New Jersey, U.S.	
6	Win	6–0	Eduardo Castillo	PTS	6	Nov 15, 1997	Spotlight 29 Casino, Coachella, California, U.S.	
5	Win	5–0	Daniel Hernandez	UD	4	Sep 13, 1997	Thomas & Mack Center, Paradise, Nevada, U.S.	
4	Win	4–0	Troy Crain	PTS	6	Jun 15, 1997	Grand Casino, Biloxi, Mississippi, U.S.	
3	Win	3–0	Jesse Berry	UD	4	Feb 22, 1997	Mohegan Sun Arena, Montville, Connecticut, U.S.	
2	Win	2–0	Mark Andreske	UD	4	Jan 10, 1997	Mohegan Sun Arena, Montville, Connecticut, U.S.	
1	Win	1–0	Marcos Antonio Rodriguez	UD	4	Nov 30, 1996	Tingley Coliseum, Albuquerque, New Mexico, U.S.	

Sporting positions
Amateur boxing titles
Previous: Robert Frazier	U.S. Golden Gloves light welterweight champion 1993, 1994	Next: Demarcus Corley
Previous: Demarcus Corley	U.S. Golden Gloves light welterweight champion 1996	Next: Adan Reyes
Minor world boxing titles
Vacant Title last held by Eleazar Contreras Jr.	IBA lightweight champion October 21, 2005 – August 2006; Vacated	Vacant Title next held by Stevie Johnston
Major world boxing titles
Preceded by José Santa Cruz	WBC lightweight champion Interim title August 12, 2006 – February 20, 2007; Promoted	Vacant Title next held by Joel Casamayor
Preceded by Joel Casamayor stripped	WBC lightweight champion February 20, 2007 – June 28, 2008	Succeeded by Manny Pacquiao
