= Ramón Montaño =

Mexican boxer (born 1982)

Personal information
- Born: Ramón Carlos Montaño Cordova; August 11, 1982 (age 43) Ciudad Obregón, Sonora, Mexico
- Height: 1.75 m (5 ft 9 in)
- Weight: Light Welterweight

Boxing career
- Reach: 178 cm (70 in)
- Stance: Orthodox

Boxing record
- Total fights: 30
- Wins: 17
- Win by KO: 2
- Losses: 10
- Draws: 2
- No contests: 1

Ramón Carlos Montaño Córdova (born November 8, 1982) is a Mexican professional boxer.

== Professional career ==
After dropping Dmitriy Salita in the first round, their bout would end in a very disputed draw. He would then lose a very close decision to David Diaz.

On October 15, 2010, Montaño lost to undefeated Frankie Gomez in Indio, California.

Ramón's next fight will be against undefeated Jesse Vargas on the undercard of Amir Khan vs. Marcos Maidana.

=== MMA ===
Ramon Montano trains in the MMA arena out of Las Vegas. He currently also trains various celebrities and is in the midst of opening his personal gym.
