= Elie Seckbach =

Israeli-born, American writer

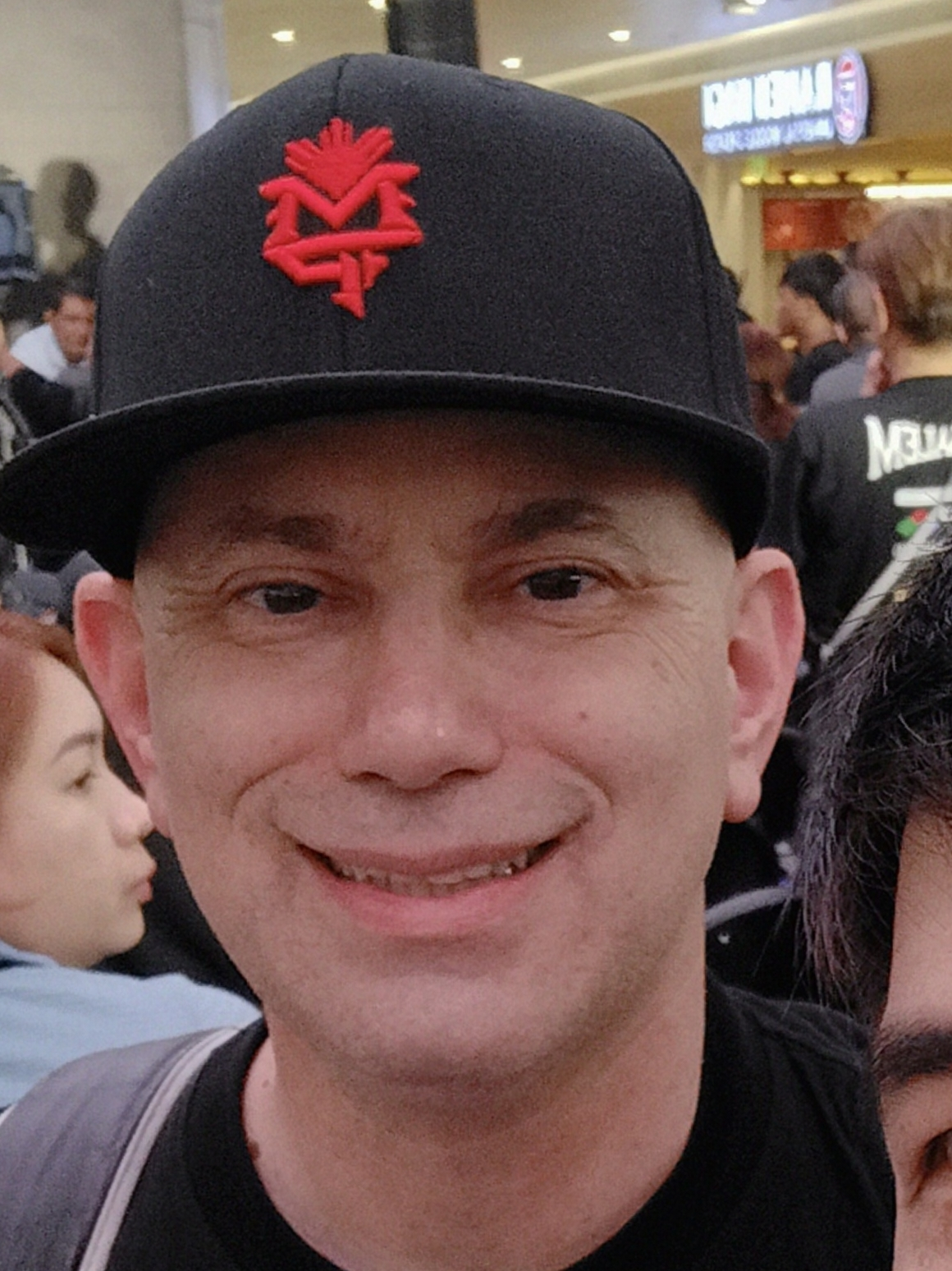
Seckbach during the weigh-in ceremonial event in 2025 at Araneta Coliseum, Cubao, Quezon City, Philippines.

Elie Seckbach is an Israeli-born, American sports reporter and YouTuber who produces videos for his self-founded YouTube channel ESNEWS, with over 1 billion cumulative views on the channel. EsNews a boxing-centric channel.

== Early life and career ==
Seckbach received a BA from California State University, Los Angeles in Broadcasting, TV and Film. He worked for a number of Los Angeles-area news stations including NBC, CBS AND FOX as well as the LA Daily News. Seckbach covered the NBA and is sampled in "KOBE BRYANT" song by Lil Wayne. For his work Seckbach has won an Emmy A Golden Mike and the AP Mark Twain Award. . Seckbach began reporting for AOL Sports in 2008. he has more interviews with Kobe Bryant than any other reporter.

He is known for his reporting style: "a video camera in search of humorous or off-color commentary."

Seckbath credits a 2008 interview with Manny Pacquiao as the reason to focus on covering boxing. That interview went viral on YouTube, with over 300,000 hits. He went on to found ESNEWS, a YouTube channel devoted to the world of boxing and sports.

Seckbach has been featured in Ring Magazine, The LA Times and Spectrum Sports. He has been awarded Reporter of the year by the WBA and ATG Radio.
