= Oscar Díaz (boxer) =

American boxer

Oscar Diaz
Personal information
- Nickname: El Torito
- Nationality: American
- Born: Oscar Diaz; September 29, 1982 San Antonio, Texas, United States
- Died: February 26, 2015 (aged 32) San Antonio, Texas
- Weight: Welterweight

Boxing career
- Stance: Orthodox

Boxing record
- Total fights: 31
- Wins: 26
- Win by KO: 20
- Losses: 3
- No contests: 2

Oscar Diaz (September 29, 1982 – February 26, 2015) was an American professional boxer and a NABF welterweight titleholder.

== Professional career ==
Díaz made his professional debut on March 16, 2001, and in 2004 suffered his first defeat to Ebo Elder.

On July 16, 2008, Diaz took on Delvin Rodriguez on ESPN2. Diaz took serious punishment throughout the fight and was unable to continue in the 11th round of the fight. He then collapsed in the ring. Diaz underwent surgery to reduce the swelling on his brain, and subsequently went into a coma.

== Later life ==
Diaz awoke from his coma after two months in September 2008, and was reportedly breathing on his own and in stable condition. According to the San Antonio Express-News, Diaz was discharged from University Hospital in San Antonio and moved to a local rehabilitation facility. Diaz died on February 26, 2015, aged 32, in his home town of San Antonio, Texas.

== Reaction to his death ==
Delvin Rodriguez commented live on ESPN2 about Diaz's death that "If I could go back in time, this fight would have never happened....Oscar, rest in peace".
