= Marcos Maidana =

Argentine boxer (born 1983)

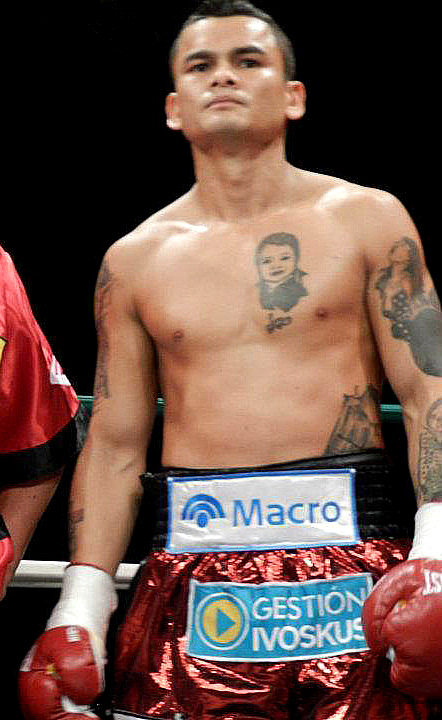

Personal information
- Nickname: El Chino ("The Chinese")
- Born: Marcos René Maidana; 17 July 1983 (age 43) Margarita, Santa Fe, Argentina
- Height: 5 ft 7 in (170 cm)
- Weight: Light welterweight; Welterweight

Boxing career
- Reach: 69 in (175 cm)
- Stance: Orthodox

Boxing record
- Total fights: 40
- Wins: 35
- Win by KO: 31
- Losses: 5

Marcos René Maidana (born 17 July 1983) is an Argentine former professional boxer who competed from 2004 to 2014. He held the WBA (Regular) super lightweight title from 2011 to 2012, and the WBA welterweight title from 2013 to 2014. A versatile brawler in the ring, Maidana was well known for his formidable punching power, and was never stopped in any of his five losses.

== Professional career ==
=== Light welterweight ===
Maidana started his career in 2004 before turning 21 years old. He fought his first 18 fights in his native Argentina over two years, winning all, including 17 via stoppage. On his 18th bout, he won the WBA Fedelatin super lightweight title. Over the next year, Maidana only fought once in Argentina, five times in Germany and once in Panama. At the end of 2008, Maidana had a professional record of 25–0, with 24 stoppages.

==== Maidana vs. Kotelnik ====
On 2 February 2009, Maidana challenged for his first world title, the WBA super lightweight championship against Andreas Kotelnik at the StadtHalle in Rostock, Germany. Kotelnik beat Maidana via controversial split decision, with the judges scoring the fight 115–114, 113–115, and 115–113 in Kotelnik's favor. Maidana was credited with landing 342 of 1241 punches thrown (28%), with 259 of them being power punches and Kotelnik was more accurate in landing 229 of his 655 thrown (35%).

==== Maidana vs. Ortiz ====
Maidana's first fight in the United States was against Victor Ortíz, which took place on June 27, 2009, for the Interim WBA super lightweight title. Ortiz entered the fight with an eight-fight knockout streak. Both Ortiz and Maidana were knocked down in the first round. Ortiz knocked Maidana to the canvas twice in the second round. Ortiz suffered a cut in the fifth round and was knocked down in the sixth. The fight was stopped when the ringside physician would not let Ortiz continue to fight. Many in the boxing media, including HBO, chastised Ortiz for not wanting to continue in the fight.

==== Maidana vs. Cayo ====
After his fight with Ortiz, it was rumoured that Maidana would face British boxer, and WBA super lightweight champion, Amir Khan, who won the title after defeating Andreas Kotelnik. However, Khan opted for Paulie Malignaggi as his next opponent. As a result, Maidana was scheduled to fight on 27 March 2010, against Victor Cayo, whose record, at that time, was 24–0 with 75% of victories coming by way of knockout. Maidana knocked out the undefeated Cayo in the sixth round to retain his interim WBA super lightweight title and improve his record to 28–1, with 27 knockouts.

==== Maidana vs. Corley ====
After failing to secure a fight with Timothy Bradley, Maidana fought and defeated DeMarcus Corley in August 2010. Despite knocking Corley down in the seventh round, Maidana had to go the distance for only the third time in his career, eventually securing the victory via unanimous decision 117–110, 117–110, and 115–112. Even with the knockdown, many believed the fight was close. By round 11, Maidana was tired and both fighters traded in the final round.

==== Maidana vs. Khan ====
Before his fight with Corley, Maidana accused Khan and trainer Freddie Roach of "hypocrisy" and called out Khan in an interview:

I'll go to Khan's home soil to take the other portion of the WBA title, which belongs to me ... They say they want me next when the cameras and mics are on. But when it comes to make the fight for real, Roach begs Golden Boy Promotions to keep Khan away from me.

Khan was looking for a good opponent to challenge him for his WBA title. One of his possible opponents was lightweight Champion Juan Manuel Marquez. Marquez decided not to move up in weight and stayed at lightweight. Maidana then stated his intention to fight Khan: "Stop looking for possible opponents for the next Khan 11 December in England. Stop looking for lightweight boxers and face the real 140-pounders. I'll go to Khan's home soil to take the other portion of the WBA title that belongs to me." The fight was confirmed on 16 September to take place at the Mandalay Bay in Las Vegas on 11 December. Khan was reported to earn at least $1.5 million compared to Maidana who had a purse of $550,000.

Khan successfully defended his title for the third time against Maidana. Khan knocked Maidana down with a combination of 2 body shots in the first round. Maidana was saved by the bell but somehow regained composure and continued to battle on. Khan dominated the scoring until tiring around round 7. Maidana rallied and midway through round 10 stunned Khan with a heavy right hand. Maidana landed a series of follow-up uppercuts and rights but could not drop Khan. Khan then rallied to win rounds 11 and 12 to solidify a unanimous points decision. The scores were 114–111, 114–111, and 113–112. Khan was open to a rematch. Khan landed 273 of 603 punches thrown (45%) and Maidana landed 156 of 767 thrown (20%). The fight was awarded Fight of the Year by the Boxing Writers Association of America.

==== Maidana vs. Morales ====
On 10 February 2011, Golden Boy promoter Richard Schaefer announced that a deal had been reached for Maidana to next fight former three-weight world champion Érik Morales (51–6, 35 KOs) on 9 April at the MGM Grand in Las Vegas on HBO PPV billed as 'Action Heroes'.

In the first round, Maidana came out with ferocity as expected and proceeded to batter his older opponent around the ring. He landed multiple power punches, including an uppercut that opened a huge swelling over Morales' left eye which worsened throughout the fight, and when the Mexican walked back to his corner having taken a large amount of punishment in the opening three minutes most observers felt their predictions were being fulfilled. The one-sided nature of the bout continued for the next couple of rounds, but then at the end of the third round Morales began to fight back and landed a hard combination to the head of Maidana and the tide began to turn. From the fourth round onwards and although he was effectively fighting with one eye, Morales gave as good as he got and was landing the cleaner more effective shots, albeit occasionally being swarmed by the sheer number of punches being landed in return by the relentless Maidana. The fight became a see-saw affair and then, in the eighth round, Morales hit Maidana with a huge left hook that almost stopped the Argentine. The next couple of rounds continued in this fashion, with Maidana using his strength and stamina to bully Morales and the Mexican using his sharper punching and ring intelligence to land effective counters and combinations. The fight was fast turning into a modern classic. In the championship rounds, Morales seemed to tire and Maidana took advantage, overwhelming him with his strength and punishing the ageing warrior continually to the head and body. Maidana finished the fight much the stronger of the two and his late surge gave him the win on the scorecards, 116–112 twice with the third judge scoring the fight a draw, 114–114. Most of the 7,154 fans in attendance booed the decision. ESPN scored the fight 114–114.

==== Maidana vs. Petrov ====
Maidana was scheduled to defend his title on 27 August 2011, against Robert Guerrero, but Guerrero suffered a shoulder injury less than two weeks before the fight. On 8 September, Russian boxer Petr Petrov (29–2–2, 13 KOs) was selected as Maidana's homecoming opponent for 23 September at Sociedad Alemana de Villa Ballester in Buenos Aires, which would also mark the bout as his first defence of the WBA (Regular) title. Petrov came into the bout having never been stopped as a professional. Breidis Prescott, who was scheduled to fight Paul McCloskey in September in a title eliminator, stated he would have put himself forward to replace Guerrero, and knocked Maidana out. Maidana became the first boxer to stop Petrov inside the distance and successfully retained his WBA title in round 4 of a one-sided fight. Petrov was in survival mode from the opening bell, trying to clinch. By round 3, Maidana began to see his punches land more and eventually dropped Petrov in round 4. Petrov got up and became a more defensive fighter for the remainder of the round until the final 30 seconds when Maidana landed a barrage of punches against the ropes, dropping Petrov again. The referee began the count, but almost immediately waived the count.

=== Welterweight ===
==== Maidana vs. Alexander ====
In December 2011 it was announced that Maidana would move up to welterweight to fight former WBC and IBF light welterweight champion Devon Alexander, who was also moving up in weight, on 25 February 2012, at the Scottrade Center in St. Louis, Missouri in a 10-round bout. Alexander was the betting favourite going into the bout. Maidana seemed uncomfortable in his first fight at the new weight as Alexander dominated the fight and went on to win a lopsided unanimous decision. The three judges scored the fight 100–90, 100–90, and 99–91 for Alexander. Alexander landed 168 punches compared to the 93 landed by Maidana. Speaking of the loss, Maidana said, "I was slower. He was very fast and complicated."

==== Maidana vs. Soto Karass ====
In July 2012, Showtime announced that Maidana would fight Jesus Soto Karass (26–7–3, 17 KOs) on the Saul Álvarez vs. Josesito Lopez undercard at the MGM Grand in Las Vegas on 15 September. Maidana won the fight by eighth-round TKO in a back-and-forth slugfest. Both boxers started fast while trading blows. Maidana looked to set up his attack behind a jab. Midway through the fight, Maidana began to tire and Karass took over. In round 7, Maidana finally had a point taken off for continuing to hit on the break. Maidana landed a right hand, dropping Karass. In round 8, Maidana continued to attack Karass against the ropes before referee Kenny Bayliss stopped the fight. According to CompuBox Stats, Maidana landed 213 of 539 punches thrown (40%) and Karass landed 179 of his 748 thrown.

On 29 November, it was announced that, whilst waiting for a big fight, Maidana would fight the largely unknown Mexican boxer Martin Ángel Martínez (13–3–1, 9 KOs) on 12 December at the Luna Park Stadium in Buenos Aires, for the vacant WBA Inter-Continental welterweight title. In front of over 7,000 local fans, Maidana won the fight by KO in the third round. Maidana started off slow, but picked up the pace in round 2 before landing a powerful left hook to body, dropping Martínez for the full 10 count. Maidana stated his intention to fight Paulie Malignaggi or Robert Guerrero next.

==== Maidana vs. Lopez ====
Maidana scored a TKO over welterweight contender Josesito Lopez in the sixth round of a 9 June 2013 fight. Maidana had injured his hip in the second round and Lopez capitalized, tagging his opponent with hard shots. Maidana was able to reverse the tide and hurt Lopez with an overhand right in the sixth round that dropped him to the canvas.

==== Maidana vs. Broner ====
In October 2013, it was announced that Adrien Broner would make his first defense of the WBA welterweight title against Maidana. Originally scheduled as a PPV fight, Golden Boy Promotions and Showtime Sports announced it would take place on regular Showtime on 14 December. The fight was due to take place at the MGM Grand arena, but later move to the Alamodome in San Antonio. Broner had stated before the fight that he did not take training camp seriously for the Malignaggi fight, and that he was going to make a statement in his first defense. There was a crowd of 11,312 at the Alamodome, with Broner a 5 to 1 betting favorite. From the opening bell, Maidana swarmed Broner, punishing him to the body and the head. In the second round, a left hook sent Broner down for the first time in his career. Broner recovered and seemed to be on the verge of taking control over a tiring Maidana, but a right to the body followed by a left hook to the head once again put Broner down in round 8. Following the knockdown, Maidana had a point deducted for a headbutt. Maidana punished Broner for the remainder of the fight, winning the fight via unanimous decision and giving Broner his first loss as a professional. The judges scored the fight 115–110, 116–109, and 117–109 in favour of Maidana. Maidana had now won four consecutive fights under the tutelage of boxing trainer Robert Garcia.

Maidana said he was open to a rematch if it made sense. Broner later said, "I'll tell you one thing: Make a rematch. I don't need a warm-up fight. I want a rematch." Maidana landed 269 of 964 total punches (28%) and 231 of 663 power shots (35%). Broner connected on 149 of 400 total punches (37%) and 122 of 292 power shots (42%). Showtime Executive Vice President Stephen Espinoza announced the fight drew 1.3 million viewers, putting it as the third-highest rated fight for the network since it began keeping track of individual fights in 2009.

Broner exercised his contractual rematch clause on 15 January 2014 to fight Maidana in a rematch. He told ESPN, "My mind is set on war. I had a bad night. He was the better man that night, but he didn't beat me. He outhustled me. I respect everything. I respect him. But I'm ready to go back to war and get my belt back." After Maidana beat Broner, he became a candidate to fight Floyd Mayweather Jr. on 3 May on Showtime PPV. The other close candidate was Amir Khan. Maidana's manager Sebastian Contursi believed his fighter deserved a big money fight. ESPN reported the rematch could take place in April 2014 in California at the StubHub Center or again at the Alamodome.

==== Maidana vs. Mayweather Jr. ====
In February 2014, despite interest in a bout with Amir Khan, Floyd Mayweather Jr. announced that he would fight Maidana on 3 May 2014, in a unification bout at MGM Grand Garden Arena, with Mayweather's WBC and The Ring welterweight titles at stake, as well as Maidana's WBA welterweight title. Maidana won the WBA title in December 2013 against Mayweather protégé, Adrien Broner. Mayweather tweeted the news the day after his 37th birthday. The Barclays Center in Brooklyn also made a case to showcase the fight. Mayweather explained why he chose Maidana, "Marcos Maidana's last performance immediately brought him to my attention. He is an extremely skilled fighter who brings knockout danger to the ring. I think this is a great fight for me and he deserves the opportunity to see if he can do what 45 others have tried to do before him – beat me." Maidana was a 12-to-1 underdog going into the fight.

In front of a sold-out crowd of 16,268, in what was one of his toughest fights, Mayweather won the bout via majority decision, with scores of 114–114, 117–111, and 116–112. Maidana came out aggressive and maintained that stance throughout the fight forcing Mayweather to engage. CompuBox revealed that Mayweather was hit more times than any of his previous 38 bouts that have been covered by them. Mayweather landed 230 of his 426 punches thrown (54%) while Maidana landed 221 of 858 (26%). Many times in the fight Maidana threw shots at different angles, forcing Mayweather against the ropes. According to Mayweather in the post fight interview, Maidana's aggressive approach made him change his style of fighting.

Maidana was guaranteed a purse of $1.5 million, which would also include TV revenue from his native Argentina and PPV share. Mayweather earned a minimum $32 million. There were calls for an immediate rematch. Mayweather said, "He put pressure on me and that's when I decided to fight differently," Mayweather said. "I stood there and fought him. He's a good fighter, I take nothing away from him [...] This was a tough, competitive fight. This is what fans want to see. "I want to give fans an exciting fight. Normally, I box and move. Tonight, I gave fans an exciting fight." Maidana felt he won the fight, believing he gave Mayweather his toughest fight ever. Speaking through a translator, he said, "I definitely think I won. Floyd had never been hit by a man before. I had to change the gloves [after a last-minute problem with his original gloves on Friday] and I still gave him a great fight."

The fight generated around 900,000 viewers although exact figures were not released by Showtime. The revenue of PPV sale amounted to $58 million.

==== Maidana vs. Mayweather Jr. II ====
On 10 July 2014, Mayweather made the announcement that a rematch with Maidana (35–4, 31 KOs) was confirmed. The fight was to take place on 13 September 2014, at the MGM Grand Garden Arena, with Mayweather's WBA (Unified), WBC and The Ring welterweight titles at stake, as well as Mayweather's WBC light middleweight title. The fight was billed as "Mayhem".

In front of 16,144 at the MGM Grand, Mayweather defeated Maidana via unanimous decision. Unlike the first fight, Mayweather came out better prepared for Maidana's style. The final judges' scores were 115–112, 116–111, and 116–111. ESPN scored it wider for Mayweather at 119–108. Despite a moment at the end of round 3 where Maidana rocked Floyd, Mayweather did not allow Maidana to land any overhand right, with the punch stats showing Maidana connecting 128 of 572 shots (22%). Mayweather had 51% connect rate landing 166 of 326.

A bizarre moment occurred in round 8, whilst in a headlock, Maidana appeared to have bitten Mayweather's left hand. Mayweather explained this in the post fight, "I didn't know what it was. Something happened and then my fingers were numb. After the eighth round my fingers were numb. I could only use my other hand. He bit me. I realized he bit me. We were tangled in the middle of the ring and all of a sudden I felt something on my left hand." Maidana denied the bite, "Maybe he thinks I'm a dog, but I never bit him. He was rubbing my eyes that round. He may have had his glove in my mouth, but I never bit him." After round 9, Maidana appeared to be confused as he started walking towards the wrong corner. Mayweather immediately ran towards him to point to his corner, much to the amusement of the crowd. Maidana was unhappy with the final verdict and thought he won the fight, "If the judges want to give the fight to fighters that run, they can give it to him. I was attacking all the time. Maybe I'm wrong, but I thought that I was the aggressor. I kept my plan to be aggressive but he kept holding and pushing. I don't want to waste my time with a third fight. I trained with all my heart to get this type of result. This is not fair. There's not reason for another fight." For the sequel, Mayweather earned a minimum of $32 million and Maidana earned a career high $3 million.

The fight did well on PPV, a reported 925,000 households bought the fight, generating $60 million. The live gate grossed nearly $15 million, putting it at number 5 in the top 35 boxing gates.

==== Retirement ====
On 9 August 2016, Maidana officially announced his retirement from professional boxing at the age of 33, allegedly moving into an advisory role. Maidana wrote in a letter addressed to boxing friends on social media: "After a long time out of the ring and after giving it a lot of thought since my last fight I've decided to hang up the gloves for good. Probably my decision would not surprise much as I had given hints of it in the last few months. But at this time I am making it official." Maidana finished with a career record of 35 wins in 40 fights, 31 wins coming by way of knockout and 5 decision losses.

== Professional boxing record ==
40 fights	35 wins	5 losses
By knockout	31	0
By decision	4	5

No.	Result	Record	Opponent	Type	Round, time	Date	Location	Notes
40	Loss	35–5	Floyd Mayweather Jr.	UD	12	13 Sep 2014	MGM Grand Garden Arena, Paradise, Nevada, U.S.	For WBA (Unified), WBC, and The Ring welterweight titles; For WBC super welterweight title
39	Loss	35–4	Floyd Mayweather Jr.	MD	12	3 May 2014	MGM Grand Garden Arena, Paradise, Nevada, U.S.	Lost WBA welterweight title; For WBC and The Ring welterweight titles
38	Win	35–3	Adrien Broner	UD	12	14 Dec 2013	Alamodome, San Antonio, Texas, U.S.	Won WBA welterweight title
37	Win	34–3	Josesito López	TKO	6 (12), 1:18	8 Jun 2013	Home Depot Center, Carson, California, U.S.	Retained WBA Inter-Continental welterweight title
36	Win	33–3	Martin Ángel Martínez	KO	3 (12), 1:21	12 Dec 2012	Estadio Luna Park, Buenos Aires, Argentina	Won vacant WBA Inter-Continental welterweight title
35	Win	32–3	Jesús Soto Karass	TKO	8 (12), 0:43	15 Sep 2012	MGM Grand Garden Arena, Paradise, Nevada, U.S.	Won vacant WBA International welterweight title
34	Loss	31–3	Devon Alexander	UD	10	25 Feb 2012	Scottrade Center, St. Louis, Missouri, U.S.	
33	Win	31–2	Petr Petrov	KO	4 (12), 2:44	23 Sep 2011	Sociedad Alemana, Villa Ballester, Argentina	Retained WBA (Regular) super lightweight title
32	Win	30–2	Érik Morales	MD	12	9 Apr 2011	MGM Grand Garden Arena, Paradise, Nevada, U.S.	Won vacant WBA interim super lightweight title
31	Loss	29–2	Amir Khan	UD	12	11 Dec 2010	Mandalay Bay Events Center, Paradise, Nevada, U.S.	For WBA super lightweight title
30	Win	29–1	DeMarcus Corley	UD	12	28 Aug 2010	Estadio Luna Park, Buenos Aires, Argentina	Retained WBA interim super lightweight title
29	Win	28–1	Victor Cayo	KO	6 (12), 1:38	27 Mar 2010	The Joint, Paradise, Nevada, U.S.	Retained WBA interim super lightweight title
28	Win	27–1	William Gonzalez	KO	3 (12), 2:20	21 Nov 2009	Club Deportivo Libertad, Sunchales, Argentina	Retained WBA interim super lightweight title
27	Win	26–1	Victor Ortiz	TKO	6 (12), 0:46	27 Jun 2009	Staples Center, Los Angeles, California, U.S.	Won vacant WBA interim super lightweight title
26	Loss	25–1	Andreas Kotelnik	SD	12	7 Feb 2009	StadtHalle, Rostock, Germany	For WBA super lightweight title
25	Win	25–0	Silverio Ortiz	KO	2 (8), 2:04	1 Nov 2008	König Pilsener Arena, Oberhausen, Germany	
24	Win	24–0	Juan Carlos Rodriguez	KO	7 (10), 2:35	29 Aug 2008	Burg-Wächter Castello, Düsseldorf, Germany	
23	Win	23–0	Esmeraldo José Da Silva	TKO	2 (10), 2:34	11 Jul 2008	Club Deportivo Libertad, Sunchales, Argentina	
22	Win	22–0	Arturo Morua	TKO	3 (10), 1:36	19 Apr 2008	Bördelandhalle, Magdeburg, Germany	
21	Win	21–0	Manuel Garnica	KO	8 (10), 0:48	7 Dec 2007	Alsterdorfer Sporthalle, Hamburg, Germany	
20	Win	20–0	Jairo Moura dos Santos	TKO	2 (8), 0:28	16 Aug 2007	Figali Convention Center, Panama City, Panama	
19	Win	19–0	Laszlo Komjathi	TKO	3 (8), 0:37	30 Jun 2007	Porsche-Arena, Stuttgart, Germany	
18	Win	18–0	Miguel Callist	TKO	3 (12), 2:59	22 Dec 2006	Lawn Tennis Club, Buenos Aires, Argentina	Won WBA Fedelatin super lightweight title
17	Win	17–0	José Herley Zúñiga Montaño	KO	1 (10), 2:13	23 Sep 2006	Club Regatas, Santa Fe, Argentina	
16	Win	16–0	Ariel Gerardo Aparicio	TKO	1 (10), 2:58	15 Jul 2006	Unidad Funcional Pueblo Chico, Tortuguitas, Argentina	
15	Win	15–0	Luis Gustavo Sosa	KO	1 (10), 2:59	20 May 2006	Centro Municipal Nº 29, Santa Fe, Argentina	
14	Win	14–0	Omar Leon	KO	1 (6), 0:21	22 Apr 2006	Estadio Luna Park, Buenos Aires, Argentina	
13	Win	13–0	Sergio Javier Benítez	KO	3 (10), 2:20	11 Feb 2006	Club Sportivo América, Rosario, Argentina	
12	Win	12–0	Rubén Darío Oliva	KO	2 (10), 2:20	26 Nov 2005	Estadio F.A.B., Buenos Aires, Argentina	
11	Win	11–0	Marcelo Martin Miranda	TKO	3 (10), 0:44	1 Oct 2005	Estadio F.A.B., Buenos Aires, Argentina	
10	Win	10–0	Daniel Benito Carriqueo	UD	6	6 Aug 2005	Estadio Ruca Che, Neuquén, Argentina	
9	Win	9–0	Sergio Javier Benítez	TKO	3 (6), 1:45	18 Jun 2005	Estadio F.A.B., Buenos Aires, Argentina	
8	Win	8–0	Omar Leon	TKO	4 (10), 1:50	7 May 2005	Estadio Virgen de Lujan, Centenario, Argentina	
7	Win	7–0	Avelino Virgilio Silveira	KO	1 (6), 1:03	26 Mar 2005	SAG Los Polvorines, Buenos Aires, Argentina	
6	Win	6–0	Adolfo Espinoza	TKO	1 (6), 3:00	29 Jan 2005	Atlético Club, Quilmes, Argentina	
5	Win	5–0	Francisco Humberto Sanabria	RTD	1 (4), 2:13	18 Dec 2004	Estadio F.A.B., Buenos Aires, Argentina	
4	Win	4–0	Ramon Alberto Marquez	TKO	1 (4), 1:02	23 Oct 2004	Estadio F.A.B., Buenos Aires, Argentina	
3	Win	3–0	Cristian Pablo Gastón Ruiz	RTD	2 (6), 1:53	4 Sep 2004	Estadio F.A.B., Buenos Aires, Argentina	
2	Win	2–0	Germán Omar Jesús Sánchez	TKO	1 (4), 1:50	24 Jul 2004	Club Sportivo América, Rosario, Argentina	
1	Win	1–0	Adán Basilio Mironchik	KO	1 (4), 0:50	12 Jun 2004	Regatas Corrientes, Corrientes, Argentina	

== Pay-per-view bouts ==
No.	Date	Fight	Billing	Buys	Network
1	9 April 2011	Morales vs. Maidana	Action Heroes	50,000	HBO
2	3 May 2014	Mayweather vs. Maidana	The Moment	900,000	Showtime
3	13 September 2014	Mayweather vs. Maidana II	Mayhem	925,000	Showtime
		Total sales		1,875,000	

Sporting positions
Regional boxing titles
Preceded by Miguel Callist	WBA Fedelatin super lightweight champion December 22, 2006 – June 2007; Vacated	Vacant Title next held by Alberto Mosquera
Vacant Title last held by Kell Brook	WBA International welterweight champion December 12, 2012 – December 14, 2013; Won world title	Vacant Title next held by Bradley Skeete
Interim world boxing titles
Vacant Title last held by Randall Bailey	WBA super lightweight champion Interim title June 27, 2009 – December 11, 2010; Lost bid for full title	Vacant Title next held by Himself
Vacant Title last held by Himself	WBA super lightweight champion Interim title April 9, 2011 – July 23, 2011; Promoted	Vacant Title next held by Johan Pérez
World boxing titles
Vacant Title last held by Vivian Harris	WBA super lightweight champion Regular title July 23, 2011 – July 16, 2012; Vacated	Vacant Title next held by Khabib Allakhverdiev
Preceded by Adrien Broner	WBA welterweight champion December 14, 2013 – May 3, 2014; Lost bid for Unified title	Succeeded by Floyd Mayweather Jr. as Unified champion
Awards
Previous: Juan Manuel Márquez vs. Juan Díaz	BWAA Fight of the Year vs. Amir Khan; 2010	Next: Delvin Rodríguez vs. Paweł Wolak
Previous: Sergio Martínez	Olimpia Award; 2013	Next: Adolfo Cambiaso
Previous: Sonny Boy Jaro; KO6 Pongsaklek Wonjongkam	The Ring Upset of the Year; UD12 Adrien Broner; 2013	Next: Chris Algieri; SD12 Ruslan Provodnikov
