= Adrien Broner =

American professional boxer (born 1989)

Personal information
- Nicknames: The Problem; Lil Brother; About Billions; A.B.; The Can Man
- Born: Adrien Jerome Broner; July 28, 1989 (age 37) Cincinnati, Ohio, U.S.
- Height: 5 ft 6 1/2 in (169 cm)
- Weight: Super featherweight; Lightweight; Light welterweight; Welterweight

Boxing career
- Reach: 69 1/2 in (177 cm)
- Stance: Orthodox

Boxing record
- Total fights: 42
- Wins: 35
- Win by KO: 24
- Losses: 5
- Draws: 1
- No contests: 1

Adrien Jerome Broner (/ˈbroʊnər/; born July 28, 1989) is an American former professional boxer and online streamer. He won world championships in four weight classes including the World Boxing Organization (WBO) super featherweight title from 2011 to 2012, the World Boxing Council (WBC) lightweight title from 2012 to 2013, the World Boxing Association (WBA) welterweight title in 2013, and the WBA super lightweight title from 2015 to 2016.

He won the vacant WBO super featherweight title in 2011, the WBC lightweight title in 2012, and the WBA welterweight title in 2013. He suffered his first career loss to Marcos Maidana in 2013. Following the Maidana defeat, he encountered challenges maintaining consistency in his boxing career. His 2015 victory over Khabib Allakhverdiev marked a rare career milestone: it made Broner only the second-youngest boxer (behind Oscar De La Hoya) to win a world title in four different weight divisions. In 2019, he challenged for the WBA (Regular) welterweight title, losing to Manny Pacquiao in a highly publicised bout.

== Early life ==
Broner grew up in Cincinnati, Ohio, and started boxing at the age of six. He has said that the sport saved him from a life on the streets.

== Amateur career ==
Broner finished his amateur career having 319 fights under his belt, with a record of 300 wins, 19 losses.

== Professional career ==
=== Super featherweight ===
==== Early career ====
Broner turned professional on May 31, 2008, and scored three consecutive first-round knockouts against Allante Davis, David Warren Huffman and Ramon Flores. In Broner's fourth fight he faced Terrance Jett at the MGM Grand in Las Vegas on the undercard of the Ricky Hatton vs Paulie Malignaggi fight. Broner defeated Jett with a stoppage in the sixth round. In Broner's fifth professional fight and final of 2008, he faced Eric Ricker; the bout ended in the second round after Broner pushed Ricker out of the ring, originally disqualifying Broner before the result was overturned to a no contest.

In January 2009, he was forced to go the distance with Jose Alfredo Lugo, at the Staples Center on the undercard of Shane Mosley vs Antonio Margarito. Broner returned to the ring in March scoring a unanimous decision over Eric Ricker. Three weeks later Broner stopped Angel Rodriguez in the fourth round. In his eighth fight Broner stepped up to eight rounds in a hard-fought fight with Fernando Quintero, pulling out a controversial majority decision victory in a fight that Quintero took on 4 days' notice. In June at the Staples Center Broner met Australian William Kickett, scoring a sixth-round knockout. On the Juan Díaz vs Paul Malignaggi undercard in Houston Broner made short work of Edgar Portillo, victory coming via stoppage in the first round. Broner defeated Henry White Jr via KO in September and finished his busy year against Tommy Atencio. Broner stopped Atencio in the first round, for the sixth time in thirteen fights. In 2010, Broner engaged in four more fights with Rafael Lora, Carlos Claudio, Guillermo Sanchez, and Ilido Julio, stopping them all.

==== Broner vs. Ponce De León ====
Broner took his first major step up in weight when he competed against former Super Bantamweight champion Daniel Ponce de León on March 5, 2011. In a very closely contested fight, Broner came away with a controversial unanimous decision victory. Broner got off to a slow start, having trouble penetrating De Leon's high guard. Broner came on strong in the fourth, hurting De Leon with a body shot. Broner slowed down in the middle and later rounds, though landed the cleaner shots, while De Leon proved to be the busier fighter. CompuBox had Broner landing 126 of his 351 (36%) of his total punches, while De Leon landed 127 of his 592 (21%) punches. Harold Lederman scored the fight: 96–94, in Ponce De Leon's favour.

==== Broner vs. Litzau ====
Broner's next fight was on HBO's Boxing After Dark show from Guadalajara, Mexico, Broner took on Top 10 Super Featherweight contender Jason Litzau in a fight scheduled for ten rounds. Broner landed combos on the ropes late in the first, with a straight right, left hook and then a right uppercut hurting the Minnesotan badly. He crumpled, and the ref leaped in, seeing he was out. The official end came at 2:58 of the first round.

==== Broner vs. Rodríguez ====
After having no luck in securing a fight with Ricky Burns, the former WBO super featherweight champion, to fight him on November 26, 2011, Broner fought contender Vicente Martin Rodriguez on the undercard of the Canelo Álvarez vs. Kermit Cintrón fight card on HBO as part of a double header. He defeated Rodriguez by knockout in the third round, to win the vacant WBO Super Featherweight World title.

Broner made a successful first defense of his WBO belt against Top 10 Super Featherweight contender and mandatory challenger Eloy Pérez on a February 25, 2012, HBO-televised card. Broner controlled the pace and action from start to finish, beating Perez to the punch and walking him down with ease. The fight ended when Broner landed a straight hand on Perez, followed by another right hand as Perez was going down, resulting in a knockout victory.

Broner's next scheduled fight was to be on July 21, 2012, at the U.S. Bank Arena in Cincinnati, against Super Featherweight contender Vicente Escobedo. However, at weigh-in for the fight on July 20, Broner was 133 1/2 pounds, well over the 130-pound limit for the Super Featherweight class, and was automatically stripped of his title. The fight went on as scheduled and Broner won by 5th-round TKO when Escobedo's corner threw in the towel.

=== Lightweight ===
==== Broner vs. DeMarco ====
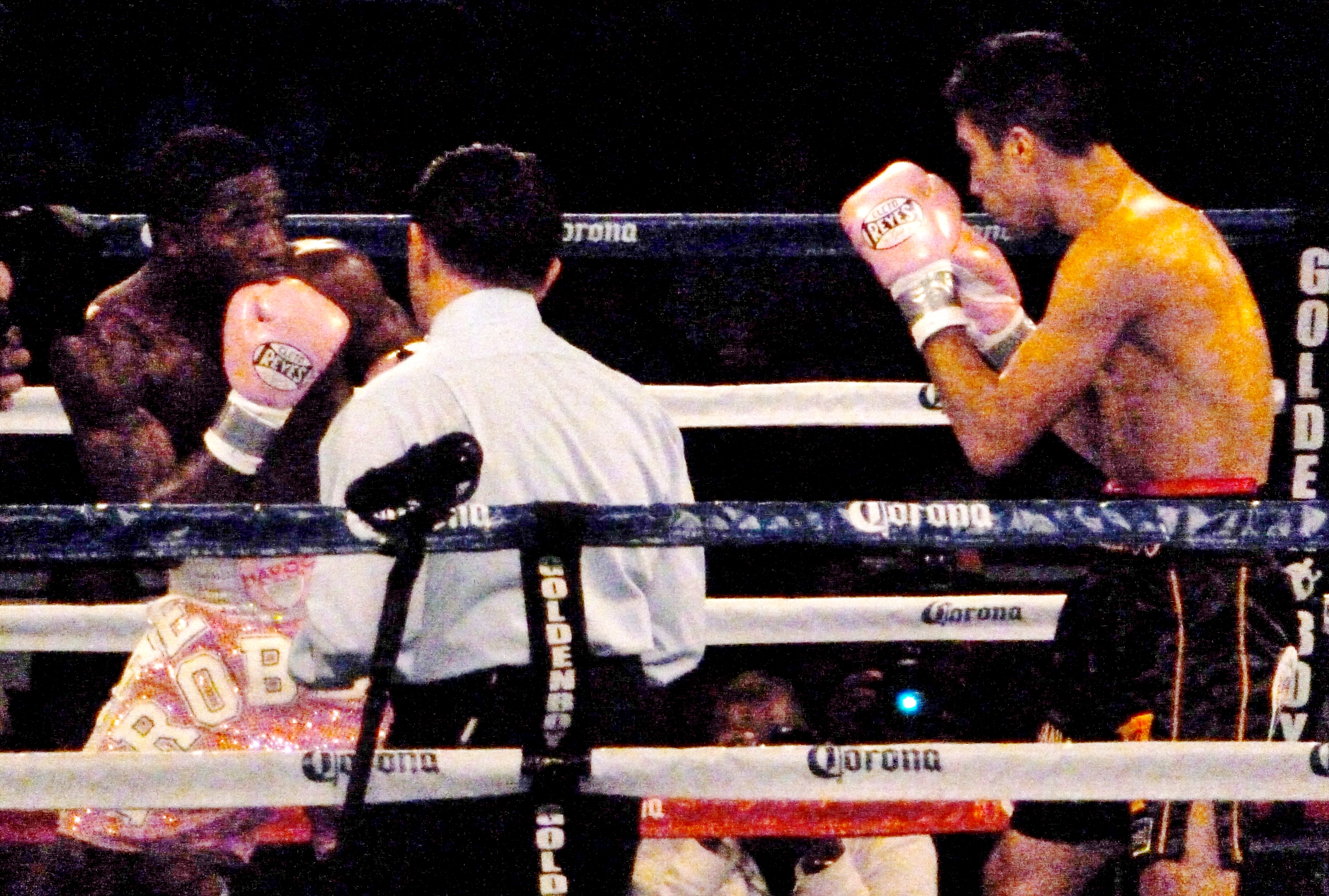
Broner vs. DeMarco, 2012

Broner's next fight was scheduled for November 17, 2012, in Atlantic City at Boardwalk Hall, and was aired on HBO. The fight marked Broner's debut in the Lightweight division. The opponent was the WBC Lightweight champion and Ring No. 1-ranked Lightweight, Antonio DeMarco. Broner started the fight off boxing DeMarco, working behind his jab and using his shoulder roll defense to frustrate DeMarco. In the early rounds, Broner was able to hit DeMarco with his quick counter left hook several times. By the 4th round, Broner and DeMarco decided to stand toe-to-toe in the center of the ring and trade punches. It was Broner who got the better of the inside fight though, with his speed and quick combination punching taking its toll on DeMarco. By the 6th round, DeMarco was cut and his face was swollen in several places while still standing toe-to-toe with Broner, with Broner barely missing his right uppercuts and working the body of DeMarco as well. Then, in the 8th round, Broner opened up another fast combination which hurt DeMarco and then a swinging left uppercut sent DeMarco to the canvas for the first time in his professional career. DeMarco's corner stopped the fight right after the knockdown, giving Broner his second world title in as many weight classes. CompuBox had Broner landing 241 of his 451 total punches. After the fight, Broner said he'd be interested in fighting Mexican boxer Juan Manuel Márquez and current WBO Lightweight champion Ricky Burns.

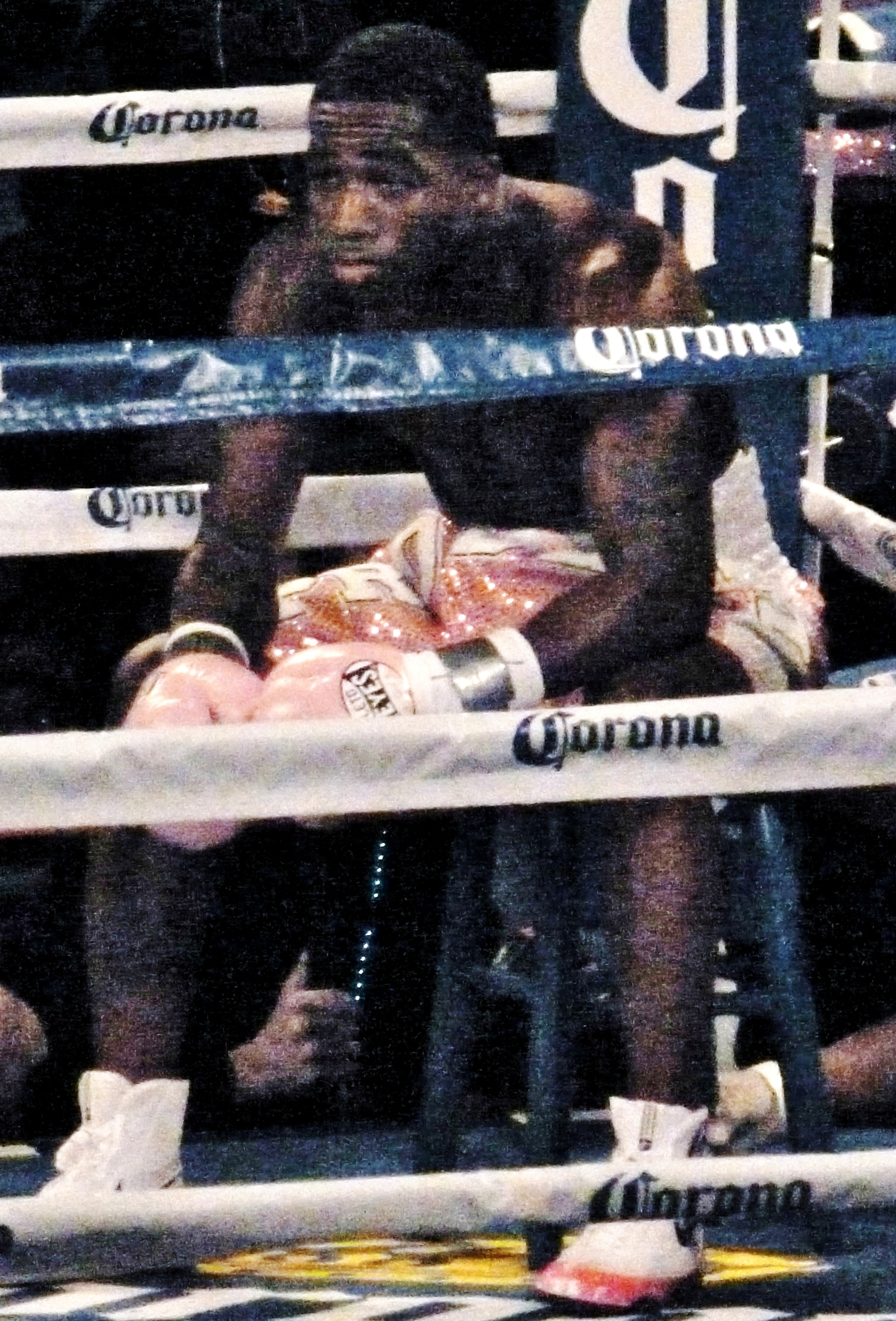
Broner in 2012

==== Broner vs. Rees ====
Broner was set to make his first title defense on February 16, 2013, at Boardwalk Hall in Atlantic City. Having no luck at getting fellow Lightweight champion Ricky Burns to fight him in February, Broner fought Ring No. 6-ranked lightweight and former WBA champion Gavin Rees (37-1-1, 18 KOs) instead. The fight was announced in December 2012, with many believing it to be a mismatch, to take place at Boardwalk Hall in Atlantic City, New Jersey. There was a crowd of 4,812 at Boardwalk Hall and both Broner and Rees weighed 150 pounds in their dressing rooms before the fight. Broner stopped Rees in five rounds, after Rees' corner threw in the towel at the end of the round. Rees had some success early, when Broner was clowning and showboating, landing jabs and body shots. By round 3, Broner was in complete control, hitting Rees with his counter left hook at will, as well as hitting Rees at will on the inside. In the 4th round, Broner sent Rees to the canvas with a quick right uppercut, and landed more combinations as the round ended. In the 5th, after a brief clinch between the two, they separated and Broner landed a hard left body shot on Rees, dropping Rees to a knee. Broner ended the round teeing off on Rees, with Rees' trainer throwing in the towel from the corner. CompuBox had Broner landing 48% of his punches in the fight, as well as ending the fight landing 40 of 57 in the final round.

=== Welterweight ===
==== Broner vs. Malignaggi ====
After failing to secure a fight with fellow lightweight champion Ricky Burns, Broner decided to move up two weight classes to welterweight in order to fight two division champion Paulie Malignaggi. Malignaggi was the WBA regular welterweight champion and The Ring No. 6 ranked welterweight. On March 10, 2013, the fight was made official. Richard Schaefer confirmed the fight would take place on June 22 at the Barclays Center in Brooklyn. Broner, Golden Boy and Al Haymon drew criticism for not fighting lightweights Burns or Miguel Vazquez and then skipping the light welterweight division, where Danny Garcia, Lucas Matthysse, and Lamont Peterson are also under the Golden Boy.

In front of 11,461 on fight night, Broner defeated Malignaggi in a controversial split decision, with one judge scoring the fight 115–113 for Malignaggi, and the other two scoring 117–111 and 115–113 for Broner. Malignaggi started the fight fast and aggressive, throwing many punches and applying his jab often. Broner found his timing by the middle of the fight, effectively timing Malignaggi with lead right hands and counter left hooks. CompuBox had Broner landing 246 (47%) of his total punches, and 214 (51%) of his power punches. Malignaggi landed 120 jabs throughout the fight, but only 94 (25%) power punches. Though there was some contention at ringside after the fight as to who deserved the split decision, The Associated Press agreed with the two judges who scored the fight for Broner, mirroring the score of 117–111 by one judge. Throughout the fight, Broner taunted Malignaggi repeatedly telling him, "You can't hit me." The pre fight was ugly and when the fight was over, they did not embrace in the ring. During the post fight interview, Broner started to show some respect, "He's a world-class fighter, and I respect him. To come to somebody's hometown and beat them on a split decision, that's saying something. This was a tremendous win for me. I mean, who's doing it like me? Nobody." He then went on to say, "I came into town, and I got his belt and his girl." Malignaggi claimed there was corruption and that Al Haymon had New York judge Tom Schreck (117–111) "in his pocket". He also threatened to quit boxing. He said, "In my hometown, as the defending champion, I felt like I should have got it." Broner earned a career-high $1.5 million compared to Malignaggi, who also earned a career-high $1.125 million purse.

==== Broner vs. Maidana ====
In October 2013 it was announced that Broner would make his first defense at welterweight against former light welterweight champion Marcos Maidana. Originally scheduled as a PPV fight, Golden Boy Promotions and Showtime Sports announced it would take place on regular Showtime on December 14. The fight was due to take place at the MGM Grand Garden Arena, but later moved to the Alamodome in San Antonio. Broner had stated before the fight that he did not take training camp seriously for the Malignaggi fight, and that he was going to make a statement in his first defense. There was a crowd of 11,312 at the Alamodome, with Broner a 5 to 1 betting favorite. From the opening bell, Maidana swarmed Broner, punishing him to the body and the head. In the second round, a left hook sent Broner down for the first time in his career. Broner recovered and seemed to be on the verge of taking control over a tiring Maidana, but a Maidana right to the body followed by a left hook to the head once again put Broner down in round 8. Following the knockdown, Maidana had a point deducted for a headbutt. Maidana punished Broner for the remainder of the fight, winning the fight via unanimous decision and giving Broner his first loss as a professional. The judges scored the fight 115–110, 116–109, and 117–109 in favour of Maidana. Broner immediately left the ring following the announcement. Fans booed and threw drinks at Broner as he made his way back to his dressing room.

Broner later apologized, saying, "I'm sorry for running out on all the fans after my fight. That was wrong of me as a fighter." Maidana said he was open to a rematch if it made sense. Broner later said, "I'll tell you one thing: Make a rematch. I don't need a warm-up fight. I want a rematch." Maidana landed 269 of 964 total punches (28%) and 231 of 663 power shots (35%). Broner connected on 149 of 400 total punches (37%) and 122 of 292 power shots (42%). Showtime Executive Vice President Stephen Espinoza announced the fight drew 1.3 million viewers, putting it as the third-highest rated fight for the network since it began keeping track of individual fights in 2009.

Broner exercised his contractual rematch clause on January 15, 2014, to fight Maidana in a rematch. He told ESPN, "My mind is set on war. I had a bad night. He was the better man that night, but he didn't beat me. He outhustled me. I respect everything. I respect him. But I'm ready to go back to war and get my belt back." After Maidana beat Broner, he became a candidate to fight Floyd Mayweather Jr. on May 3 on Showtime PPV. The other close candidate was Amir Khan. Maidana's manager Sebastian Contursi believed his fighter deserved a big money fight. ESPN reported the rematch could take place in April 2014 in California at the StubHub Center or again at the Alamodome.

=== Light welterweight ===
==== Broner vs. Molina ====
On March 26, 2014, it was announced that Broner would mark his first professional fight as a light welterweight on the Mayweather vs. Maidana undercard on May 3 at the MGM Grand Garden Arena against once beaten fringe contender Carlos Molina (17-1-1, 7 KO), who had not fought since being handed his first professional loss to Amir Khan in December 2012. The bout was scheduled for 10 rounds. Broner was still high on his rematch with Maidana, claiming that when Maidana loses to Mayweather, he would have to rematch him. Broner, who is usually flashy and charismatic, fought the bout with a bit less showboating, working for a clear win. Broner outworked Molina winning the fight via unanimous decision. The three judges scored the fight 100–90, 99–91, and 98–92 in his favour. The scorecards suggested the fight was wide, although some media outlets called it a closer fight. ESPN scored the fight 99–91 for Broner. Broner was the aggressor and landed jabs frequently. Molina was game, throwing body shots and attacking Broner's left shoulder, then attempting to come over the top with his right hand, both in the middle of the ring and with Broner on the ropes. Molina also attempted to counter punch Broner and get inside, as Broner had superior reach, Molina had only limited success. After the fight, Broner took to the microphone and said, "It was a comeback fight and shook the cobwebs off. As you can see I really didn't go through no trouble. It was a sparring match. [The loss] definitely humbled me in some ways but I'm still Adrien 'The Problem' Broner and anyone can get it." Broner was paid $1.25 million and Molina had a $150,000 purse.

==== Broner vs. Taylor ====
Broner remained at light welterweight to fight 23 year old Emmanuel Taylor (18–2, 12 KOs) for the WBA International title. The official press conference took place on August 14, 2014, to announce the fight. Taylor won his last fight by way of unanimous decision against Karim Mayfield. The fight took place at the U.S. Bank Arena, Cincinnati in-front of 8,115 Broner fans on September 6. Broner had not fought in his hometown in 26 months prior to the fight. Taylor started the fight charging Broner. Broner spent a large portion of the early rounds on the ropes, appearing to be unaffected by Taylor's punches. In the middle rounds, Broner increased his punch activity, making for back and forth action. By round 8, Taylor's activity reduced dramatically, allowing Broner to secure the last four rounds using his jab to set up power shots. Broner sealed the decision in his favor with a left hook to the jaw of Taylor which sent Taylor to the canvas in round 12. Broner won the fight via unanimous decision with the judges' scorecards as 116–111, 116–111, and 115–112. After the fight, standing beside Taylor, Broner said, "There's a lot of people who wouldn't come here to Cincinnati to fight me, and he put up a helluva fight. It's guys like him who don't get a chance to fight guys like me to show their talent, so I thank him for taking this fight." Broner landed 201 of 524 punches thrown (38%) while Taylor landed 181 of 655 punches thrown (28%). Broner said he would like to fight Argentine slugger Lucas Matthysse (36–3, 34 KOs) next, who also won on the same card.

=== Return to welterweight ===
==== Broner vs. Porter ====
On May 16, 2015, TGB Promotions and Mayweather Promotions announced that Broner would fight fellow Ohio boxer and former IBF Welterweight champion Shawn Porter (25-1-1, 16 KOs) on June 20 at the MGM Grand Grand Garden Arena in Las Vegas on Premier Boxing Champions on NBC at a catchweight of 144lbs as per Broner's demand. Going into the fight, Broner was 4–0 at the arena. Prior to the fight, Broner spoke about how he didn't expect Maidana, the only boxer to beat him professionally, to fight him again, although he wanted to avenge the loss. Broner lost a unanimous decision to Porter with scores of 118–108, 115–111, and 114–112. In the 11th round Broner was deducted a point for excessive holding. Porter, who dominated the majority of the fight, was sent to the canvas by Broner in the 12th round. The knockdown was not enough to secure Broner the win, as the fight was one-sided for the majority of the rounds. Leading up the fight, the welterweight champ Porter criticized Broner's team having put a 157 lbs. weight-limit clause in the contract, which stopped Porter from rehydrating to his normal weight on fight day. Porter was quoted as saying, "You want to move up into my weight, then move up! Don’t be scared. Don’t be worried. Don’t be afraid. Put your skill on the line along with your record. Put it all on the line at 147. Don’t put it at 144, then not want to talk about it." The remarks came as Broner had repeatedly refused to comment on the catchweight situation, which many believed would put Broner in a negative light. The fight drew close to 2.4 million viewers. Broner had a purse of $1.35 million compared to Porter's $1 million.

=== Return to light welterweight ===
==== Broner vs. Allakhverdiev ====
After Jessie Vargas vacated his WBA super lightweight title to move up to welterweight, Broner announced that he would return to the 140 pound division to pursue a fourth world title. He was slated to fight former WBA champion Khabib Allakhverdiev (19–1, 9 KOs), who lost the title to Vargas in April 2014. A date in October 2015 was considered with the bout taking place in either Las Vegas or Cincinnati. On August 28, Showtime announced via an official press release the fight was confirmed for October 3 at the U.S. Bank Arena in Cincinnati, Ohio. Allakkverdiev had not fought in 18 months prior to this fight and was fighting for only the second time since July 2013. Broner won the vacant WBA title defeating Allakhverdiev by TKO in the 12th round. Broner's win was not a surprise by boxing aficionados, as Allahkverdiev is known to be a slow, soft-punching opponent. It came to a point in the final round where Broner was landing at will, although it seemed as though Allakhverdiev could continue and hear the final bell, referee Harvey Dock stepped in and halted the fight at 2:23 of the round. Allakhverdiev, was taking punches, failed to land any of his own. After the fight, when asked what he would do next, Broner replied, "I’m going to fight whoever I want to fight whenever I want to fight,” Broner said afterwards. “They say my big brother Floyd Mayweather has a fighter that he thinks can beat me. I think his name is Ashley [Theophane]." At the time, Theophane wasn't ranked in the top 15 by the World Boxing Association.

==== Broner vs. Theophane ====
On February 19, 2016, Premier Boxing Champions announced that Broner would defend his WBA super lightweight title against British veteran boxer Ashley Theophane (39–6–1, 11 KO) on April 1 at D.C. Armory in Washington, D.C., live on Spike. Broner was stripped ahead of the fight, for missing the 140-pound limit. Broner defeated Theophane by TKO in the 9th round. Before the stoppage by referee Luis Pabon, Broner was leading on the scorecards 78–74, 78–74, and 77–75. Theophane was rocked several times during the fight, almost leading to a knockdown in the 4th round. The fight was scheduled to be for the, but After the fight, Broner called out Floyd Mayweather Jr., as tensions between the former friends had increased in the past months, due to comments about TMT (The Money Team) by Broner.

=== Second return to welterweight ===
==== Broner vs. Granados ====
Prior to Ricky Burns retaining his world title against Kiryl Relikh, talks emerged about putting Burns and Broner in a fight for December 2016. Broner announced he would next fight Adrian Granados at a catchweight of 142 pounds on February 11, 2017, on Showtime Championship Boxing. Ongoing talks continued for a potential Broner vs. Burns fight to take place sometime in 2017. The fight card was pushed back a week to February 18. On February 9, 2017, it was revealed that the fight would take place at the welterweight limit of 147 pounds after a request from Broner when he felt sick during training camp. Before the fight, the purses were revealed. Broner earned a base purse of $1 million whilst Granados earned $250,000, a career-high purse. Broner won a 10-round split decision, which was considered controversial. Two judges scored it 97–93 and 96–94 for Broner and the third judge had it 97–93 for Granados. Broner was more accurate with his punches, landing 166 of 403 punches thrown (41%). Granados connected 146 of 683 thrown (21%). Granados called for a rematch in Chicago but Broner declined saying, “I’m taking my career more serious,” hinting he will not be giving Granados a rematch. The fight drew an average 779,000 viewers and peaked at 859,000 viewers according to Nielsen Media Research.

=== Second return to light welterweight ===
==== Broner vs. Garcia ====
On May 25, 2017, it was announced that talks were underway for a fight between Broner and WBC lightweight champion Mikey Garcia (36–0, 30 KOs) on July 29, 2017, at Barclays Center in Brooklyn. A deal which would include a catchweight of 140 pounds, the super lightweight limit, with Showtime the likely network to broadcast the fight. On Monday 22 May, Broner was sentenced to 72 hours at the Kenton County Detention Center in Covington, Kentucky, on a contempt charge, after failing to make multiple court appearances. Garcia said he would be returning to lightweight after the fight, adding that the Broner fight was 'too good and too lucrative' to pass up. If Broner misses weight, he would be fined $500,000. He said he would be more disciplined because he won't give up half a million dollars and claimed he had a reason to not miss weight. On July 20, 8 days before the official weigh in, Broner reportedly weighed 144 pounds and said that he would 'comfortably make weight tomorrow'. On July 21, the WBC announced that their Diamond light welterweight title would be at stake for the fight. Garcia weighed in a career high 139.5 pounds and more than Broner, who weighed 138.7 pounds.

Garcia won the fight by unanimous decision with the three judges scoring the fight 117–111, 116–112, and 116–112. The fight started tentatively, with both boxers landing few punches in the opening round. But over the course of the fight, Garcia took over and by the championship rounds he was significantly outpacing Broner in punches landed and thrown. ESPN scored the fight 120–108 shutout win for Garcia. In the post fight interviews, Garcia praised his performance and Broner, "This is definitely one of my best performances ever. I think I controlled the fight in the early rounds and I kept the activity up. [Broner] is a great fighter who has great skills. I was the superior fighter tonight." Broner was humble in defeat, but stated that he had to catch Garcia, who he claimed was running: "It was a good fight. At the end of the day, I come to fight, I come to win and I put my heart on the line. It was Tom & Jerry – I had to catch the mouse." It was Broner's first loss at light welterweight.

Both fighters earned a $1 million purse for the fight. CompuBox punch statistics showed that Garcia was the more active boxer, landed 244 of 783 punches (31%), Broner landed only 125 of 400 shots thrown (31%). The fight drew an average 881,000 viewers on Showtime and peaked at 937,000 viewers, making it the most watched fight on Showtime since Deontay Wilder defeated Bermane Stiverne to win the WBC heavyweight title in January 2015. That fight drew an average of 1.24 million.

==== Broner vs. Vargas ====
On November 5, 2017, according to Alex Vaysfeld, manager of IBF light welterweight champion Sergey Lipinets (13–0, 10 KOs), Broner was being targeted as a first defence for March 2018. Lipinets won the then-vacant title on November 4 against Japanese boxer Akihiro Kondo. On December 18, The Ring TV reported that a deal was being discussed which would match Broner against Omar Figueroa Jr. (27-0-1, 19 KOs) on Showtime in the Spring of 2018. On January 24, Showtime announced Broner vs. Figueroa would take place on April 21 at the Barclays Center in New York. On March 4, Figueroa pulled out of the fight after injuring his shoulder in training. PBC stated the card would still go ahead and they would find a new opponent for Broner. The next day, Showtime confirmed that Broner would now fight former two-weight world champion Jessie Vargas (28–2, 10 KOs) in a 144-pound catchweight bout, headlining a card also featuring the re-booked Jermall Charlo-Hugo Centeno Jr. fight and Gervonta Davis-Jesús Cuellar.

The attendance for the event was 13,964. With the arena only set up for 10,000, they opened additional sections in the upper tiers. Broner and Vargas fought to a 12-round majority draw. One judge scored the fight 115–113 for Broner and the remaining two judges overruled with identical scores of 114–114. ESPN's Dan Rafael and Showtimes unofficial scorer Steve Farhood both scored the bout 114–114. The fight was of two halves. The first half of the fight saw Vargas take up a nice lead, controlling the bout and then looked to fade a little, allowing Broner to take control for the remainder of the bout. Vargas out landed Broner 124–82 in the opening 6 rounds and Broner out landed Vargas 112–79 in the remaining 6 rounds. After the fight, Broner said, "I beat him 7-5 [in rounds]. As you can see, I was letting my hands go more. I ain't got a scratch on me. I want to thank Jessie Vargas. He's a two-time world champion for a reason. He came to fight, but at the end of the day, you all know I beat him.I was connecting with right hands. I got warmed up in the early portion of the fight before taking over. My trainer was a big help tonight. I want to thank Coach Cunningham as well as my original coach, Mike Stafford, for realizing I needed to do something different." According to CompuBox stats, Broner landed 194 of 507 punches thrown (38%) and Vargas landed 203 of his 839 thrown (24%). Vargas worked on the body more, landing 54 punches to 38 landing by Broner. For the fight Broner earned a $1 million purse and Vargas earned a $500,000 purse. The fight averaged 782,000 viewers and peaked at 869,000 during the bout. Peak viewership increased to 891,000 just before the scorecards were read.

=== Third return to welterweight ===
==== Broner vs. Pacquiao ====
After eight-division world champion Manny Pacquiao signed with Al Haymon in October 2018, reports circulated that Broner was the front-runner to face him in January 2019. On October 18, 2018, Pacquiao confirmed that the deal was almost complete. On November 19, 2018, a press conference was held in New York City to confirm the fight between Broner and Pacquiao on January 19, 2019, for the WBA (Regular) welterweight title. The fight took place at the MGM Grand Garden Arena in Las Vegas, Nevada and was distributed by Showtime PPV. Pacquiao was guaranteed at least $20 million from the fight, with $10 million being his base purse and the remainder made up from PPV revenue, Filipino TV rights, sponsorship and merchandise. Broner was paid a $2.5 million fight purse.

Broner lost by unanimous decision, with all three judges having scoring the fight in favor of Pacquiao 117–111, 116–112, and 116–112. His opponent never seemed troubled throughout the fight and in the seventh round, Broner was trapped to the ropes as Pacquiao unloaded a barrage of punches that prompted Broner to tie him up to halt the attacks. Pacquiao then continued his onslaught after the break, but Broner survived the round nonetheless. In the ninth round, Pacquiao caught Broner with a huge left hand that sent Broner reeling backwards. According to CompuBox stats, Pacquiao landed 82 out of 197 of his power punches (42%) against Broner's 39 out of 180 power punches (22%). Total punch stats were 112 out of 568 (20%) for Pacquiao and 50 out of 295 (17%) for Broner. This marked Broner's career low for total punches landed at 50, his previous low was 90 against Jessie Vargas. However, during the post fight interview with Jim Gray, Broner claimed victory and said, "I controlled the fight. He was missing. I hit him clean more times. I beat him." He felt it was a setup for a Mayweather–Pacquiao rematch and accused Gray of being against him, after which Gray abruptly ended the interview.

The fight sold 400,000 pay-per-view buys in the United States, earning an estimated $30 million in pay-per-view revenue. The bout produced a live gate of $6 million from 11,410 tickets sold. The final attendance was reported to be 13,025.

=== Comeback ===
==== Broner vs. Santiago ====
After a 25-month layoff, Broner faced undefeated Jovanie Santiago on February 20, 2021, on Showtime. Broner won a controversial unanimous decision, with scores of 116–111, 115–112 and 117–110. The result was Broner's first victory in over four years, since he defeated Adrián Granados in February 2017. Santiago walked Broner down in the first half of the fight, landing combinations and attacking Broner's body. In contrast, Broner was reluctant to throw combinations, and typically stuck to singular jabs and worked with his back to the ropes. Broner became more active in the second half of the fight, often finding success with his left hook. However, it was Santiago who finished the stronger of the two, connecting on 32 of 95 punches (33.7%) in the twelfth and final round, while Broner only landed 7 of 34 thrown (20.6%). Over the entire duration of the fight, CompuBox saw Broner landing 98 out of 338 punches (29%), while Santiago outlanded him with 207 out of 697 punches (29.7%).

The decision was controversial, and attention was drawn to the fact that two of the three judges awarded Broner the first round, despite him not landing a single punch in the round according to CompuBox.

== Legal issues ==
In October 2016, Broner posted alarming images and captions on his Instagram page hinting suicide and on October 17, 2016, he was charged with a misdemeanor battery for allegedly choking a waitress at Drai's, a nightclub in Las Vegas.

On April 20, 2017, Broner was arrested on a warrant stemming from a failure to appear in court for a previous arrest in 2014.

On September 10, 2017, TMZ reported an incident in Las Vegas that was caught on video of Broner knocking out an agitating fan. TMZ Sports obtained and posted an edit of the video, which started with Broner taking pictures with fans. A moment later a man began to heckle Broner. Broner became aggressive as his female companion tried to restrain him, but Broner shoved her away and delivered a blow that reeled the agitator backwards, knocking him out.

Broner was issued a summons on October 26 concerning the incident, but it was returned on November 8 and was "not deliverable as addressed; unable to forward." The records did not give a reason as to why the summons was not able to be delivered. He subsequently was scheduled to appear in court for an arraignment but the Las Vegas Justice Court stated Broner failed to appear. A warrant was then issued for his arrest. According to TMZ, it reached out to Broner who told them he "didn't know about the hearing -- and if he did, he would have appeared."

On February 13, 2018, Broner was booked into Fulton County Jail in Atlanta on a misdemeanor sexual battery charge but was later released on bail.

In March 2019, Broner was issued a restraining order after making homophobic threats on social media.

On December 18, 2019, Broner was ordered to pay over $830,000 for sexually assaulting a woman in a Cleveland nightclub on June 18, 2018.

In October 2021, Broner was jailed for a parole violation after failing to enroll in a court-mandated alcohol treatment program.

== Professional boxing record ==
| 42 fights | 35 wins | 5 losses |
|---|---|---|
| By knockout | 24 | 0 |
| By decision | 11 | 5 |
| Draws | 1 | |
| No contests | 1 | |

| No. | Result | Record | Opponent | Type | Round, time | Date | Location | Notes |
|---|---|---|---|---|---|---|---|---|
| 42 | Loss | 35–5–1 (1) | Blair Cobbs | UD | 10 | Jun 7, 2024 | Hard Rock Hotel & Casino, Hollywood, Florida, U.S. | |
| 41 | Win | 35–4–1 (1) | Bill Hutchinson | UD | 10 | Jun 9, 2023 | Casino Miami Jai Alai, Miami, U.S. | |
| 40 | Win | 34–4–1 (1) | Jovanie Santiago | UD | 12 | Feb 20, 2021 | Mohegan Sun Arena, Montville, Connecticut, U.S. | |
| 39 | Loss | 33–4–1 (1) | Manny Pacquiao | UD | 12 | Jan 19, 2019 | MGM Grand Garden Arena, Paradise, Nevada, U.S. | For WBA (Regular) welterweight title |
| 38 | Draw | 33–3–1 (1) | Jessie Vargas | MD | 12 | Apr 21, 2018 | Barclays Center, New York City, New York, U.S. | |
| 37 | Loss | 33–3 (1) | Mikey Garcia | UD | 12 | Jul 29, 2017 | Barclays Center, New York City, New York, U.S. | |
| 36 | Win | 33–2 (1) | Adrían Granados | SD | 10 | Feb 18, 2017 | Cintas Center, Cincinnati, Ohio, U.S. | |
| 35 | Win | 32–2 (1) | Ashley Theophane | TKO | 9 (12), 1:10 | Apr 1, 2016 | D.C. Armory, Washington, D.C., U.S. | WBA super lightweight title at stake only for Theophane after Broner missed weight |
| 34 | Win | 31–2 (1) | Khabib Allakhverdiev | TKO | 12 (12), 2:23 | Oct 3, 2015 | U.S. Bank Arena, Cincinnati, Ohio, U.S. | Won vacant WBA super lightweight title |
| 33 | Loss | 30–2 (1) | Shawn Porter | UD | 12 | Jun 20, 2015 | MGM Grand Garden Arena, Paradise, Nevada, U.S. | |
| 32 | Win | 30–1 (1) | John Molina Jr. | UD | 12 | Mar 7, 2015 | MGM Grand Garden Arena, Paradise, Nevada, U.S. | |
| 31 | Win | 29–1 (1) | Emanuel Taylor | UD | 12 | Sep 6, 2014 | U.S. Bank Arena, Cincinnati, Ohio, U.S. | Retained WBA International super lightweight title |
| 30 | Win | 28–1 (1) | Carlos Molina | UD | 10 | May 3, 2014 | MGM Grand Garden Arena, Paradise, Nevada, U.S. | Won vacant WBA International super lightweight title |
| 29 | Loss | 27–1 (1) | Marcos Maidana | UD | 12 | Dec 14, 2013 | Alamodome, San Antonio, Texas, U.S. | Lost WBA welterweight title |
| 28 | Win | 27–0 (1) | Paulie Malignaggi | SD | 12 | Jun 22, 2013 | Barclays Center, New York City, New York, U.S. | Won WBA welterweight title |
| 27 | Win | 26–0 (1) | Gavin Rees | TKO | 5 (12), 2:59 | Feb 16, 2013 | Boardwalk Hall, Atlantic City, New Jersey, U.S. | Retained WBC lightweight title |
| 26 | Win | 25–0 (1) | Antonio DeMarco | TKO | 8 (12), 1:49 | Nov 17, 2012 | Boardwalk Hall, Atlantic City, New Jersey, U.S. | Won WBC lightweight title |
| 25 | Win | 24–0 (1) | Vicente Escobedo | TKO | 5 (12), 2:42 | Jul 21, 2012 | U.S. Bank Arena, Cincinnati, Ohio, U.S. | WBO super featherweight title at stake only for Escobedo after Broner missed weight |
| 24 | Win | 23–0 (1) | Eloy Pérez | KO | 4 (12), 2:44 | Feb 25, 2012 | Scottrade Center, St. Louis, Missouri, U.S. | Retained WBO super featherweight title |
| 23 | Win | 22–0 (1) | Vicente Martín Rodríguez | KO | 3 (12), 1:43 | Nov 26, 2011 | U.S. Bank Arena, Cincinnati, Ohio, U.S. | Won vacant WBO super featherweight title |
| 22 | Win | 21–0 (1) | Jason Litzau | TKO | 1 (10), 2:58 | Jun 18, 2011 | Arena VFG, Guadalajara, Mexico | Won vacant WBC–USNBC super featherweight title |
| 21 | Win | 20–0 (1) | Daniel Ponce de León | UD | 10 | Mar 5, 2011 | Honda Center, Anaheim, California, U.S. | Won vacant WBO Inter-Continental super featherweight title |
| 20 | Win | 19–0 (1) | John Revish | RTD | 1 (8), 3:00 | Jan 15, 2011 | Taft Theatre, Cincinnati, Ohio, U.S. | Won vacant WBC–USNBC lightweight title |
| 19 | Win | 18–0 (1) | Ilido Julio | TKO | 1 (8), 1:34 | Nov 6, 2010 | Prudential Center, Newark, New Jersey, U.S. | |
| 18 | Win | 17–0 (1) | Guillermo Sanchez | TKO | 2 (10), 1:48 | Sep 4, 2010 | Hamilton County Fair, Cincinnati, Ohio, U.S. | |
| 17 | Win | 16–0 (1) | Carlos Claudio | RTD | 6 (10), 3:00 | Jun 19, 2010 | Taft Theatre, Cincinnati, Ohio, U.S. | Won vacant WBC Youth Intercontinental super featherweight title |
| 16 | Win | 15–0 (1) | Rafael Lora | TKO | 1 (10), 3:00 | May 14, 2010 | Paradise Theater, New York City, New York, U.S. | |
| 15 | Win | 14–0 (1) | Roberto Acevedo | TKO | 4 (6), 0:14 | Jan 23, 2010 | Hyatt Regency, Cincinnati, Ohio, U.S. | |
| 14 | Win | 13–0 (1) | Tommy Atencio | TKO | 1 (6), 2:58 | Nov 28, 2009 | Duke Energy Convention Center, Cincinnati, Ohio, U.S. | |
| 13 | Win | 12–0 (1) | Henry White Jr. | KO | 3 (6), 3:00 | Sep 5, 2009 | Hamilton County Fair, Cincinnati, Ohio, U.S. | |
| 12 | Win | 11–0 (1) | Edgar Portillo | TKO | 1 (10), 1:37 | Aug 22, 2009 | Toyota Center, Houston, Texas, U.S. | |
| 11 | Win | 10–0 (1) | William Kickett | KO | 6 (8), 2:58 | Jun 27, 2009 | Staples Center, Los Angeles, California, U.S. | |
| 10 | Win | 9–0 (1) | Fernando Quintero | MD | 8 | May 8, 2009 | Sundance Square, Fort Worth, Texas, U.S. | |
| 9 | Win | 8–0 (1) | Angel Rodriguez | TKO | 4 (6), 0:23 | Apr 4, 2009 | Frank Erwin Center, Austin, Texas, U.S. | |
| 8 | Win | 7–0 (1) | Eric Ricker | UD | 6 | Mar 14, 2009 | Duke Energy Convention Center, Cincinnati, Ohio, U.S. | |
| 7 | Win | 6–0 (1) | Luis Alfredo Lugo | UD | 6 | Jan 24, 2009 | Duke Energy Convention Center, Cincinnati, Ohio, U.S. | |
| 6 | NC | 5–0 (1) | Eric Ricker | DQ | 2 (4), 1:18 | Dec 27, 2008 | Cintas Center, Cincinnati, Ohio, U.S. | Originally a DQ win for Ricker after Broner pushed him out of the ring, later ruled a NC |
| 5 | Win | 5–0 | Scott Furney | TKO | 1 (6), 1:14 | Dec 6, 2008 | MGM Grand Garden Arena, Paradise, Nevada, U.S. | |
| 4 | Win | 4–0 | Terrance Jett | TKO | 6 (6), 0:33 | Nov 22, 2008 | MGM Grand Garden Arena, Paradise, Nevada, U.S. | |
| 3 | Win | 3–0 | Ramon Flores | TKO | 1 (4), 2:11 | Sep 27, 2008 | Home Depot Center, Carson, California, U.S. | |
| 2 | Win | 2–0 | David Warren Huffman | TKO | 1 (4), 1:20 | Aug 30, 2008 | Cincinnati Gardens, Cincinnati, Ohio, U.S. | |
| 1 | Win | 1–0 | Allante Davis | KO | 1 (4), 0:32 | May 31, 2008 | Hyatt Regency, Cincinnati, Ohio, U.S. | |

== Titles in boxing ==
=== Major world titles ===
- WBO super featherweight champion (130 lbs)
- WBC lightweight champion (135 lbs)
- WBA light welterweight champion (140 lbs)
- WBA welterweight champion (147 lbs)

=== Regional/International titles ===
- WBC Youth Intercontinental super featherweight champion (130 lbs)
- WBO Inter-Continental super featherweight champion (130 lbs)
- USNBC super featherweight champion (130 lbs)
- USNBC lightweight champion (135 lbs)
- WBA International light welterweight champion (140 lbs)

== Pay-per-view bouts ==
| Date | Fight | Billing | Buys | Network | Revenue |
|---|---|---|---|---|---|
| January 19, 2019 | Pacquiao vs. Broner | Return to Vegas | 400,000 | Showtime | $30,000,000 |

== Filmography ==
Broner has only ever been in content about him.

Television Series
| Year | Series | Role | Notes |
|---|---|---|---|
| 2012 | 2 Days: Adrien Broner | Himself | Documentary |
| 2012 | 2 Days: Adrien Broner Part II | Himself | Documentary |
| 2013 | A Day in the Life | Himself | Documentary |

== Entrance themes ==
- "Lurkin'" by Waka Flocka Flame (July 21, 2012)
- "Backseat Freestyle" by Kendrick Lamar (November 17, 2012)
- "Ain't Worried About Nothin'" by French Montana (June 22, 2013)
- "Dis Ain't What U Want" by Lil Durk (December 14, 2013)
- "Box Chevy" by Rick Ross (May 3, 2014)
- "Lifestyle" by Young Thug and Rich Homie Quan (September 6, 2014)

== See also ==
- List of world super-featherweight boxing champions
- List of world lightweight boxing champions
- List of world light-welterweight boxing champions
- List of world welterweight boxing champions
- List of boxing quadruple champions

Sporting positions
Regional boxing titles
| New title | WBC Youth Intercontinental super featherweight champion June 19, 2010 – September 3, 2010; Stripped | Vacant Title next held by Marco Antonio López |
| Vacant Title last held by Edner Cherry | WBC–USNBC lightweight champion January 15, 2011 – March 2011; Vacated | Vacant Title next held by John Molina Jr. |
| Vacant Title last held by Joseph Laryea | WBO Inter-Continental super featherweight champion March 5, 2011 – June 2011; Vacated | Vacant Title next held by Román Martínez |
| Vacant Title last held by Eloy Pérez | WBC–USNBC super featherweight champion June 18, 2011 – November 2011; Vacated | Vacant Title next held by Daniel Ponce de León |
| Vacant Title last held by Alexandr Zhuravskiy | WBA International super lightweight champion May 3, 2014 – March 2015; Vacated | Vacant Title next held by Ramal Amanov |
World boxing titles
| Vacant Title last held by Ricky Burns | WBO super featherweight champion November 26, 2011 – July 20, 2012; Stripped | Vacant Title next held by Román Martínez |
| Preceded by Antonio DeMarco | WBC lightweight champion November 17, 2012 – January 28, 2014; Stripped | Succeeded by Omar Figueroa Jr. promoted from interim status |
| Preceded by Paulie Malignaggi | WBA welterweight champion June 22, 2013 – December 14, 2013 | Succeeded by Marcos Maidana |
| Vacant Title last held by Danny García | WBA super lightweight champion October 3, 2015 – March 31, 2016; Super title from November 6, 2015; Stripped | Vacant Title next held by Ricky Burns as Champion |
