= Adrien Broner vs. Marcos Maidana =

Boxing competition

Danger Zone
- Date: December 14, 2013
- Venue: Alamodome, San Antonio, Texas, U.S.
- Title(s) on the line: WBA welterweight title

Tale of the tape
Boxer	(United States) Adrien Broner	(Argentina) Marcos Maidana
Nickname	"The Problem"	"El Chino" ("The Chinaman")
Hometown	Cincinnati, Ohio, U.S.	Margarita, Santa Fe, Argentina
Pre-fight record	27–0 (22 KO)	34–3 (31 KO)
Age	24 years, 4 months	30 years, 4 months
Height	5 ft 6 in (168 cm)	5 ft 7 in (170 cm)
Weight	144 1/2 lb (66 kg)	146 1/4 lb (66 kg)
Style	Orthodox	Orthodox
Recognition	WBA; Welterweight Champion; WBC; Lightweight Champion; The Ring No. 9 ranked pound-for-pound fighter The Ring; No. 7 Ranked Welterweight; TBRB; No. 9 Ranked Welterweight; 3-division world champion	WBA; No. 2 Ranked Welterweight; TBRB; No. 8 Ranked Welterweight; The Ring; No. 10 Ranked Welterweight

Result
- Maidana wins via 12-round unanimous decision (115–110, 116–109, 117–109)

Adrien Broner vs. Marcos Maidana, billed as Danger Zone, was a professional boxing match, contested for Broner's WBA welterweight title. The match was held at the Alamodome in San Antonio, Texas.

== Background ==
In October 2013, it was announced that Broner would make his first defense of his welterweight belt against Marcos Maidana. Originally scheduled as a PPV fight, Golden Boy Promotions and Showtime Sports announced it would take place on regular Showtime on 14 December. The fight was originally due to take place at the MGM Grand Garden Arena, but later moved to the Alamodome in San Antonio. Broner stated in the build up that he did not take training camp seriously for the Malignaggi fight, and that he was going to make a statement in his first defense.

Broner was a 5 to 1 betting favorite.

== The fight ==
From the opening bell, Maidana swarmed Broner, punishing him to the body and the head. In the second round, a left hook sent Broner down for the first time in his career. Broner recovered and seemed to be on the verge of taking control over a tiring Maidana, but a Maidana right to the body followed by a left hook to the head once again put Broner down in round 8. Following the knockdown, Maidana had a point deducted for a headbutt. Maidana punished Broner for the remainder of the fight, winning the fight via unanimous decision and giving Broner his first loss as a professional. The judges scored the fight 115–110, 116–109, and 117–109 in favour of Maidana.

== Aftermath ==
Broner immediately left the ring following the announcement. Fans booed and threw drinks at Broner as he made his way back to his dressing room. Broner would later apologize, saying, "I'm sorry for running out on all the fans after my fight. That was wrong of me as a fighter." Maidana said he was open to a rematch if it made sense. Broner later said, "I'll tell you one thing: Make a rematch. I don't need a warm-up fight. I want a rematch." Maidana landed 269 of 964 total punches (28%) and 231 of 663 power shots (35%). Broner connected on 149 of 400 total punches (37%). Showtime Executive Vice President Stephen Espinoza announced the fight drew 1.3 million viewers, putting it as the third-highest rated fight for the network since it began keeping track of individual fights in 2009.

Broner activated his rematch clause in January 2014, telling ESPN, "My mind is set on war. I had a bad night. He was the better man that night, but he didn't beat me. He outhustled me. I respect everything. I respect him. But I'm ready to go back to war and get my belt back." ESPN reported the rematch could take place in April 2014 in California at the StubHub Center or again at the Alamodome. However Maidana would instead face WBC champion Floyd Mayweather Jr..

== Undercard ==
Confirmed bouts:

== Broadcasting ==
Country	Broadcaster
Australia	Main Event
USA	Showtime

Preceded by vs. Paulie Malignaggi	Adrien Broner's bouts December 14, 2013	Succeeded by vs. Carlos Molina
Preceded by vs. Josesito López	Marcos Maidana's bouts December 14, 2013	Succeeded by vs. Floyd Mayweather
Awards
Preceded by Sonny Boy Jaro vs. Pongsaklek Wonjongkam	The Ring Upset of the Year; 2013	Succeeded by Chris Algieri vs. Ruslan Provodnikov
