= Ricky Quiles =

Puerto Rican boxer

Ricky Quiles (born 1970 in Lorain, Ohio) is a retired American-born Puerto Rican lightweight boxer who won two titles. He was inducted into the Lorain Sports Hall of Fame in 2019.

His career record stands at 39 wins, 8 losses, and 2 draws.

He has 4 regional titles and fought for 1 world title but lost to Nate Campbell.

In his youth, he participated in boxing, football, and swimming. He later moved on to boxing professionally and went on to win his first title fight some years later.
