= Paulie Malignaggi vs. Adrien Broner =

2013 boxing competition

- Date: June 22, 2013
- Venue: Barclays Center, Brooklyn, New York
- Title(s) on the line: WBA welterweight title

Tale of the tape
Boxer	(United States) Paulie Malignaggi	(United States) Adrien Broner
Nickname	"The Magic Man"	"The Problem"
Hometown	Brooklyn, New York	Cincinnati, Ohio
Purse	$1,125,000	$1,500,000
Pre-fight record	32–4 (7 KO)	26–0 (22 KO)
Age	32 years, 6 months	23 years, 10 months
Height	5 ft 8 in (173 cm)	5 ft 6 in (168 cm)
Weight	146 1/2 lb (66 kg)	146 3/4 lb (67 kg)
Style	Orthodox	Orthodox
Recognition	WBA; Welterweight Champion; The Ring; No. 4 Ranked Welterweight; TBRB; No. 10 Ranked Welterweight; 2-division world champion	WBC; Lightweight Champion; The Ring No. 6 ranked pound-for-pound fighter The Ring/TBRB; No. 1 Ranked Lightweight; 2-division world champion

Result
- Broner wins via 12-round split decision (115-113, 113-115, 117-111)

Paulie Malignaggi vs. Adrien Broner, was a boxing welterweight championship fight for Malignaggi's WBA welterweight title. The bout was held on June 22, 2013, at the Barclays Center in Brooklyn, New York, United States on Showtime. The undercard included the rematch Johnathon Banks and Seth Mitchell.

== Background ==
After failing to secure a fight with WBO lightweight champion Ricky Burns, WBC champion Adrien Broner decided to move up two weight classes to welterweight in order to challenge WBA welterweight champion Paulie Malignaggi. On March 10, 2013, the fight was made official for June 22 at the Barclays Center in Brooklyn.

The build up to the fight was marred by an excessive amount of trash talk, with the pre fight press conference featuring comments by both fighters.

Malignaggi entered the ring as a 15 to 2 underdog.

== The fight ==
Malignaggi started the fight fast and aggressive, throwing many punches and applying his jab often. Broner found his timing by the middle of the fight, effectively timing Malignaggi with lead right hands and counter left hooks. Throughout the fight, Broner taunted Malignaggi repeatedly telling him, "You can't hit me." At the end of 12 rounds, Broner defeated Malignaggi in a split decision, with one judge scoring the fight 115–113 for Malignaggi, and the other two scoring 117–111 and 115–113 for Broner, making him a 3 weight world champion at just 23 years of age. The Associated Press scored the bout 117–111 for Broner. CompuBox had Broner landing 246 (47%) of his total punches while Malignaggi landed 214 (25%) punches.

== Aftermath ==
During the post fight interview, Broner did show some respect, "He's a world-class fighter, and I respect him. To come to somebody's hometown and beat them on a split decision, that's saying something. This was a tremendous win for me. I mean, who's doing it like me? Nobody." He then went on to say, "I came into town, and I got his belt and his girl." Malignaggi claimed there was corruption and that Al Haymon had New York judge Tom Schreck (117–111) "in his pocket". He also threatened to quit boxing. He said, "In my hometown, as the defending champion, I felt like I should have got it."

== Fight Card ==
Confirmed bouts:

Weight Class				Result	Round	Time	Notes
Welterweight	(United States) Paulie Malignaggi	vs.	(United States) Adrien Broner	SD	12		WBA championship bout
Heavyweight	(United States) Johnathon Banks	vs.	(United States) Seth Mitchell	UD	12
Super Middleweight	(Cameroon) Sakio Bika	vs.	(Mexico) Marco Antonio Peribán	MD	12		WBC championship bout
Super Welterweight	(United States) Julian Williams	vs.	(Canada) Joachim Alcine	UD	8

== Broadcasting ==
Country	Broadcaster
Australia	Main Event
Canada	Super Channel
Poland	Orange Sport
USA	Showtime

Preceded by vs. Pablo César Cano	Paulie Malignaggi's bouts June 22, 2013	Succeeded by vs. Zab Judah
Preceded by vs. Gavin Rees	Adrien Broner's bouts June 22, 2013	Succeeded by vs. Marcos Maidana
