= Erik Morales vs. Marcos Maidana =

Boxing competition

Action Heroes
- Date: April 9, 2011
- Venue: MGM Grand Garden Arena, Las Vegas, Nevada, United States
- Title(s) on the line: vacant WBA interim light welterweight title

Tale of the tape
Boxer	(Mexico) Erik Morales	(Argentina) Marcos Maidana
Nickname	El Terrible	El Chino
Hometown	Tijuana, Baja California, Mexico	Santa Fe, Argentina
Pre-fight record	51-6 (35 KO)	29-2-0 (27 KO)
Height	5 ft 8 in (173 cm)	5 ft 7 in (170 cm)
Weight	140 lb (64 kg)	140 lb (64 kg)
Recognition	3-division champion	former WBA interim light welterweight champion

Result
- Maidana defeated Morales via Majority decision. (114-114, 116-112, 116-112)

Erik Morales vs. Marcos Maidana, billed as Action Heroes, was a boxing light welterweight fight for the Interim WBA Light Welterweight championship. The bout took place on April 9 at MGM Grand Garden Arena in Las Vegas, Nevada, United States.

Morales, a Mexican legend and a five time world champion at three different weight classes, made his mark in the Junior Welterweight division by obtaining the WBC Silver light welterweight title in September 2010 and defending it in December of the same year. Following his last bout, he expressed his desire to fight Juan Manuel Marquez, however Marquez turned this fight down and then the matchup was made with Maidana through Golden Boy Promotions.

Maidana was coming from a twelve-round decision loss against then title-holder Amir Khan in December 2010, his second shot at a world title. This was his chance to start back on the road to another full title shot.

== Background ==
=== Erik Morales ===
Morales officially ended his retirement on March 27, 2010 by returning and defeating José Alfaro. Morales' precision and stamina overcame Alfaro; easily defeating him via unanimous decision. In his second fight after returning to the ring Erik Morales fought Willie Limond. Limond started strong in the first three rounds being very quick, elusive, and staying away from Morales' reach. Morales threw body shots to slow his opponent down and fought very conservative until Limond started getting tired. The fight was stopped as Limond could not carry on and won the WBC Silver World Light Welterweight title. He then defended his title against tough challenger Francisco Lorenzo and won by unanimous decision.

=== Marcos Maidana ===
In his first shot at a major world title, Maidana lost via points decision to the rugged Andriy Kotelnik somewhat controversially, a result that had a lot of observers questioning the judges. After that he went on to win the WBA Interim belt by stopping prospect Victor Ortiz, both of them exchanging knockdowns. He made three successful defenses before challenging reigning champion Amir Khan, 2 of which were by knockouts. In an anticipated match between two exciting junior-welterweights there was bound to be fireworks. Khan defeated Maidana by unanimous decision, and the championship fight received a lot of recognition as 2010's Fight of the Year.

== Undercard ==
=== Televised ===
- Lightweight bout: (United States) Robert Guerrero vs. (Australia) Michael Katsidis

Guerrero defeated Katsidis via unanimous decision. (117-108, 118-106, 118-107)

- Welterweight bout: (United States) Paul Malignaggi vs. (Puerto Rico) Jose Miguel Cotto

Malignaggi defeated Cotto via unanimous decision. (99-91, 97-93, 99-91)

- Light Middleweight bout: (United States) James Kirkland vs. (Japan) Nobuhiro Ishida

Ishida defeated Kirkland via technical knockout. The fight was stopped at 1:53 of round one.

=== Preliminary card ===
- Light Welterweight bout: (United States) Danny Garcia vs. (United States) Nate Campbell

Garcia defeated Campbell via unanimous decision. (99-91, 98-92, 100-90)

- Light Middleweight bout: (Canada) Mikaël Zewski vs. (United States) Clint Coronel

Zewski defeated Coronel via split decision. (60-54, 60-54 ,59-55)

- Cruiserweight bout: (Russia) Rakhim Chakhkiev vs. (United States) Harvey Jolly

Chakhkiev defeated Jolly via technical knockout in the third round.

== Fight earnings ==
- Erik Morales $250,000 vs. Marcos Maidana $500,000

== The Fight ==
In the first round, Maidana came out with ferocity as expected and proceeded to batter his older opponent around the ring. He landed multiple power punches, including an uppercut that opened a huge swelling over Morales' left eye which worsened over the course of the fight, and when the Mexican walked back to his corner having taken a large amount of punishment in the opening three minutes most observers felt their predictions were being fulfilled. The one-sided nature of the bout continued for the next couple of rounds, but then at the end of the third round Morales begin to fight back and landed a hard combination to the head of Maidana and the tide began to turn.

From the fourth round onwards and although he was effectively fighting with one eye, Morales gave as good as he got and was landing the cleaner more effective shots, albeit occasionally being swarmed by the sheer number of punches being landed in return by the relentless Maidana. The fight became a see-saw affair and then, in the eighth round, Morales hit Maidana with a huge left hook that almost stopped the Argentinian. The next couple of rounds continued in this fashion, with Maidana using his strength and stamina to bully Morales and the Mexican using his sharper punching and ring intelligence to land effective counters and combinations. The fight was fast turning into a modern classic.

In the "championship rounds" (the eleventh and twelfth), Morales seemed to tire and Maidana took advantage, overwhelming him with his strength and punishing the ageing warrior continually to the head and body. Maidana finished the fight much the stronger of the two and his late surge gave him the win on the scorecards, 116-112 twice with the third judge scoring the fight a draw, 114-114.

With this victory, Maidana was awarded the interim WBA championship and was ranked among other fighters in the division, such as Khan and Timothy Bradley. Morales performed in the match despite disadvantages and some observers contested the result. Morales and Maidana discussed a rematch in post-fight interviews, with July 30 noted as a potential date.

Preceded by L12 Amir Khan	Marcos Maidana's bouts April 9, 2011	Succeeded by KO4 Petr Petrov
Preceded by W12 Francisco Lorenzo	Erik Morales' bouts April 9, 2011	Succeeded by KO10 Pablo César Cano
