= Victor Cayo =

Dominican boxer

Personal information
- Nickname: Mermelada ("Marmalade")
- Nationality: Dominican
- Born: Victor Manuel Cayo; November 17, 1984 (age 41) Santo Domingo, Dominican Republic
- Height: 5 ft 11 in (180 cm)
- Weight: Light welterweight; Welterweight

Boxing career
- Reach: 73 in (185 cm)
- Stance: Orthodox

Boxing record
- Total fights: 39
- Wins: 32
- Win by KO: 23
- Losses: 6
- No contests: 1

Victor Manuel Cayo (born November 17, 1984) is a Dominican former professional boxer who competed from 2006 to 2014, and challenged once for the WBA interim super lightweight title in 2010.

== Professional career ==
Cayo made his professional debut on May 8, 2006, scoring a four-round unanimous decision over Hector Bello. For the next four years, Cayo would remain undefeated while fighting mainly in his native Dominican Republic. On March 27, 2010, he fought for his first major world championship—the WBA interim light welterweight title—against fellow hard-hitting puncher Marcos Maidana, who entered as champion. Cayo suffered his professional loss when he was knocked out in the sixth round from a body shot.

Another high-profile fight on July 29, 2011, this time an eliminator for the IBF light welterweight title, saw Cayo getting knocked out by Lamont Peterson in the final few seconds of the last round. Further losses mounted throughout the subsequent years, including a late-rounds stoppage against Nate Campbell on March 24, 2012.

== Professional boxing record ==
| 39 fights | 32 wins | 6 losses |
|---|---|---|
| By knockout | 23 | 6 |
| By decision | 9 | 0 |
| No contests | 1 | |

| No. | Result | Record | Opponent | Type | Round, time | Date | Location | Notes |
|---|---|---|---|---|---|---|---|---|
| 39 | Loss | 32–6 (1) | Jose Zepeda | KO | 1 (10), 1:27 | Nov 8, 2014 | Gimnasio Nuevo León, Monterrey, Mexico | |
| 38 | Loss | 32–5 (1) | Roberto García | TKO | 6 (10), 2:38 | May 1, 2014 | Park Race Track, Hialeah, Florida, U.S. | |
| 37 | Win | 32–4 (1) | Ricardo Veras | KO | 1 (10), 0:39 | Aug 24, 2013 | Fiesta Hotel & Casino, Santo Domingo, Dominican Republic | |
| 36 | Loss | 31–4 (1) | Emanuel Taylor | TKO | 8 (10), 1:11 | Mar 8, 2013 | Resorts Casino Hotel, Atlantic City, New Jersey, U.S. | |
| 35 | Win | 31–3 (1) | Vladimir Baez | UD | 10 | Dec 17, 2012 | Fiesta Hotel & Casino, Santo Domingo, Dominican Republic | Won Dominican Republic and vacant WBC Latino light welterweight titles |
| 34 | Win | 30–3 (1) | Pedro Rincon Miranda | TKO | 1 (10), 0:34 | Sep 28, 2012 | Casa Puerto Rico, La Romana, Dominican Republic | |
| 33 | Win | 29–3 (1) | Julio De Jesus | TKO | 3 (10), 1:36 | Aug 11, 2012 | Coliseo de boxeo Carlos "Teo" Cruz, Santo Domingo, Dominican Republic | |
| 32 | Win | 28–3 (1) | Jose Antonio Rodriguez | TKO | 1 (10), 1:23 | Jun 23, 2012 | Club El Millón, Santo Domingo, Dominican Republic | |
| 31 | Loss | 27–3 (1) | Nate Campbell | TKO | 9 (10), 0:45 | Mar 24, 2012 | Palacio de los Deportes Virgilio Travieso Soto, Santo Domingo, Dominican Republic | |
| 30 | Win | 27–2 (1) | Nelson Sanchez | KO | 1 (6), 1:37 | Nov 6, 2011 | Hard Rock Hotel & Casino Punta Cana, Higüey, Dominican Republic | |
| 29 | Loss | 26–2 (1) | Lamont Peterson | KO | 12 (12), 2:46 | Jul 29, 2011 | Cosmopolitan of Las Vegas, Paradise, Nevada, U.S. | |
| 28 | Win | 26–1 (1) | Jovany Javier Gomez | KO | 1 (6) | Oct 29, 2010 | Gimnasio, Mexicali, Mexico | |
| 27 | Win | 25–1 (1) | Jose Alexis Castillo | TKO | 2 (10), 2:04 | Aug 19, 2010 | Fiesta Hotel & Casino, Santo Domingo, Dominican Republic | |
| 26 | Loss | 24–1 (1) | Marcos Maidana | KO | 6 (12), 1:38 | Mar 27, 2010 | The Joint, Paradise, Nevada, U.S. | For WBA interim light welterweight title |
| 25 | Win | 24–0 (1) | Julio Reyes | TKO | 3 (12), 0:43 | Dec 21, 2009 | Coliseo de boxeo Carlos "Teo" Cruz, Santo Domingo, Dominican Republic | Retained WBA Fedecaribe light welterweight title |
| 24 | Win | 23–0 (1) | Julio Díaz | UD | 10 | Jul 31, 2009 | Hard Rock Live, Hollywood, Florida, U.S. | |
| 23 | Win | 22–0 (1) | Arturo Morua | TKO | 1 (9), 2:02 | May 30, 2009 | UVI Sports and Fitness Center, Charlotte Amalie, U.S. Virgin Islands | Retained WBA Fedecaribe light welterweight title |
| 22 | Win | 21–0 (1) | Wilson Alcorro | UD | 9 | Mar 30, 2009 | Coliseo de boxeo Carlos "Teo" Cruz, Santo Domingo, Dominican Republic | Retained WBA Fedecaribe light welterweight title |
| 21 | Win | 20–0 (1) | Noe Bolanos | UD | 9 | Jan 30, 2009 | UVI Sports and Fitness Center, Charlotte Amalie, U.S. Virgin Islands | |
| 20 | Win | 19–0 (1) | Augusto Gamez | TKO | 1 | Dec 20, 2008 | Palacio de los Deportes Virgilio Travieso Soto, Santo Domingo, Dominican Republic | |
| 19 | Win | 18–0 (1) | Orlando Escobar | KO | 6 (6), 2:59 | Nov 21, 2008 | Casino Rama, Rama, Canada | Retained WBA Fedecaribe light welterweight title |
| 18 | Win | 17–0 (1) | Mercedes Nova | KO | 2 (9), 2:22 | Oct 3, 2008 | Barcelo Bavaro Beach Resort and Convention Center, Higüey, Dominican Republic | Won vacant WBA Fedecaribe light welterweight title |
| 17 | Win | 16–0 (1) | Harrison Cuello | UD | 6 | Jun 21, 2008 | Hard Rock Live, Hollywood, Florida, U.S. | |
| 16 | Win | 15–0 (1) | Hector Bello | TKO | 3 (6) | Mar 15, 2008 | Club Paraiso, Santo Domingo, Dominican Republic | |
| 15 | Win | 14–0 (1) | Alberto Hernandez | KO | 2 (10), 2:34 | Dec 17, 2007 | Coliseo de boxeo Carlos "Teo" Cruz, Santo Domingo, Dominican Republic | Won vacant UBC Ibero-American light welterweight title |
| 14 | Win | 13–0 (1) | Arturo Gomez | UD | 12 | Nov 12, 2007 | Coliseo de boxeo Carlos "Teo" Cruz, Santo Domingo, Dominican Republic | |
| 13 | Win | 12–0 (1) | Yovanny Ascencio | TKO | 3 (6) | Jul 29, 2007 | Club Calero, Santo Domingo Este, Dominican Republic | |
| 12 | Win | 11–0 (1) | Axel Rodrigo Solis | TKO | 3 (6) | Jun 1, 2007 | Coliseo de boxeo Carlos "Teo" Cruz, Santo Domingo, Dominican Republic | Won vacant WBC–CABOFE light welterweight title |
| 11 | Win | 10–0 (1) | Ambioris Figuero | KO | 2 (8) | Apr 16, 2007 | Coliseo de boxeo Carlos "Teo" Cruz, Santo Domingo, Dominican Republic | |
| 10 | Win | 9–0 (1) | Luis Sosa | TKO | 3 (6), 1:20 | Mar 17, 2007 | Coliseo de boxeo Carlos "Teo" Cruz, Santo Domingo, Dominican Republic | |
| 9 | Win | 8–0 (1) | Luis Antonio Guzman | TKO | 3 (8) | Feb 18, 2007 | San Pedro de Macorís, Dominican Republic | |
| 8 | Win | 7–0 (1) | Francisco Rios Gil | KO | 3 (6), 1:32 | Dec 18, 2006 | Palacio de los Deportes Virgilio Travieso Soto, Santo Domingo, Dominican Republic | |
| 7 | Win | 6–0 (1) | George Nunez | KO | 2 (6), 0:58 | Nov 27, 2006 | Coliseo de boxeo Carlos "Teo" Cruz, Santo Domingo, Dominican Republic | |
| 6 | Win | 5–0 (1) | Ramon Jimenez | PTS | 4 | Oct 27, 2006 | Club Luperon, Santo Domingo, Dominican Republic | |
| 5 | Win | 4–0 (1) | Leonardo Espinal | PTS | 6 | Sep 24, 2006 | Club Paraiso, Santo Domingo, Dominican Republic | |
| 4 | NC | 3–0 (1) | Leonardo Espinal | NC | 2 (6) | Aug 27, 2006 | Club Calero, Santo Domingo Este, Dominican Republic | |
| 3 | Win | 3–0 | Cristian Martinez | KO | 1 (6) | Jul 22, 2006 | Polideportivo, San Cristóbal, Dominican Republic | |
| 2 | Win | 2–0 | Francisco Melendez | TKO | 2 | May 27, 2006 | Dominican Republic | |
| 1 | Win | 1–0 | Hector Bello | UD | 4 | May 8, 2006 | Coliseo de boxeo Carlos "Teo" Cruz, Santo Domingo, Dominican Republic | |

Sporting positions
Regional boxing titles
| Vacant Title last held by Noel Cortez | WBC–CABOFE light welterweight champion June 1, 2007 – July 2007; Vacated | Vacant Title next held by Pavel Miranda |
| Vacant Title last held by Rosemberg Gomez | WBA Fedecaribe light welterweight champion October 3, 2008 – March 27, 2010; Lost bid for interim world title | Vacant Title next held by Roberto Ortiz |
| Vacant Title last held by Vladimir Baez | Dominican Republic light welterweight champion December 17, 2012 – March 2013; Vacated | Vacant Title next held by Julio De Jesus |
| Vacant Title last held by Julian Alejandro Salas | WBC Latino light welterweight champion December 17, 2012 – March 2013; Vacated | Vacant Title next held by Ricardo Álvarez |
