= Nate Campbell =

American boxer (born 1972)

Personal information
- Nickname: The Galaxxy Warrior
- Nationality: American
- Born: Nathaniel Campbell III; March 7, 1972 (age 54) Jacksonville, Florida, U.S.
- Height: 5 ft 7 in (170 cm)
- Weight: Super featherweight; Lightweight; Light welterweight; Welterweight

Boxing career
- Reach: 70 in (178 cm)
- Stance: Orthodox

Boxing record
- Total fights: 50
- Wins: 37
- Win by KO: 26
- Losses: 11
- Draws: 1
- No contests: 1

Nathaniel "Nate" Campbell III (born March 7, 1972) is an American former professional boxer who competed from 2000 to 2014, and currently works as a TV host and gym owner of Galaxxy Boxing Refuge. In boxing he held the unified WBA (Undisputed), IBF and WBO lightweight titles from 2008 to 2009, as well as having challenged for the IBF super featherweight title in 2005 and the WBO junior welterweight title in 2009.

== Professional career ==
=== Early years at lightweight ===
Campbell turned professional in 2000 in Tallahassee and quickly stormed through his opponents. He won his first 23 fights, setting up a bout with cagey veteran Joel Casamayor in 2003.

=== Super featherweight ===
Casamayor won a unanimous decision, but many commentators, including those for HBO, believed that Campbell had fought a much closer match then what the scorecards indicated. Some commentators even stated that Campbell had won that closely fought match.

After that bout Campbell slipped into obscurity after two defeats to Robbie Peden and a loss to Francisco Lorenzo. In the first loss to Peden, Campbell appeared to drop his hands to taunt his opponent and was promptly knocked out. After these fights, many in the boxing world believed that Nate Campbell's boxing days were over.

==== Return to lightweight ====
Nonetheless, Campbell stormed back on the scene in 2005 with a big win over undefeated prospect Almazbek "Kid Diamond" Raiymkulov. In 2006, he lost a split decision to Isaac Hlatshwayo, but won an IBF title eliminator against Matt Zegan. Instead of a title shot, Campbell's next bout was another eliminator, which he won over Ricky Quiles. After knocking out Wilson Alcorro, his next bout was a split decision victory over the undefeated Juan Díaz on March 8, 2008, to become the new IBF, WBA, and WBO unified World Lightweight Champion. Campbell was the underdog coming into the fight, as Díaz was considered too strong and too technically sound. But Campbell surprised the boxing world by controlling the tempo of the fight. The first 7 rounds were heavily contested but from the 8th round afterwards, Campbell completely controlled the fight as Diaz's eyes began swelling.

Campbell's first defense of his recently won WBA, WBO and IBF titles was to be against Joan Guzmán who just moved up from the Super Featherweight division. The fight was to take place at the Beau Rivage Resort & Casino, Mississippi, United States on September 13, 2008. But because Guzman weighed in more than 3 pounds above the weight limit, Campbell's titles weren't staked. Unfortunately, due to Guzman being dehydrated after trying to make the weight, the Guzman camp backed out and the fight was cancelled.

On January 10, 2009, Campbell vacated his WBA lightweight title because of concerns regarding sanctioning fees and proposed mandatory defenses.

Just as Guzman had trouble making weight, Campbell experienced a similar problem as he was supposed to defend his IBF and WBO lightweight crowns against Ali Funeka on February 14, 2009. On weigh-in, however, Campbell was more than 2 pounds over the weight limit. As a result, he was removed of both titles. The fight still went on as scheduled, Funeka could have claimed the IBF and WBO titles with a victory. However, Campbell won a majority decision by the scores of 114-112, 115-111, and 113-113. Despite the win, Campbell was ineligible to regain the titles, which are now vacant. Campbell stated that he will be moving up to the 140 pound junior welterweight division after the bout.

=== Light welterweight ===
On August 1, 2009, Campbell took on 140 lbs. titlist Timothy Bradley. The Jacksonville native moved up to the light welterweight division after he failed to make the lightweight limit in his last fight against Ali Funeka. The WBO light welterweight title was at stake. The bout was held at the Agua Caliente Casino in Rancho Mirage, California.

The fight with Bradley only lasted three rounds after Campbell was unable to continue due to an internal eye injury caused by an unintentional headbutt from Bradley. Bradley was initially awarded a TKO victory by California referee David Mendoza. However, a replay showed that the injury was in fact caused by an accidental clash of heads, and should thus be ruled a no decision. Since then, the decision has been overruled to a No Contest after review by the California State Athletic Commission.

In December 2009 Campbell was granted a release from Don King Productions, and signed a new promotional contract with Golden Boy Promotions. Campbell's lead trainer is former world champion John David Jackson, and his business advisor is One Punch Productions.

Campbell fought Victor Ortíz on May 15, 2010, at the Madison Square Garden in New York. The former undisputed champion entered the ring as the underdog and eventually lost the bout by unanimous decision. On November 27, 2010, Campbell lost an eight-round decision on the Juan Manuel Márquez undercard in Las Vegas to Walter Estrada, a journeyman whose record included only three wins over winless fighters in twelve bouts between 2008–2010. On November 29, 2010, Nate Campbell announced his retirement from boxing.

=== Comeback ===
On April 21, 2011, Nate came out of retirement to fight unbeaten Danny Garcia, losing a Unanimous Decision.

Nate continued being active fighting a month later, winning against Sherzod Nazarov in an 8-round UD. On September 25, 2011, Campbell lost to Khabib Allakhverdiyev.

On March 24, 2012, Nate won by TKO in 9 rounds in the Dominican Republic against "Mermelada" Cayó.

On April 27, 2013, Campbell was defeated by Briton Terry Flannigan in Sheffield, United Kingdom, when the fight was stopped after 4 Rounds when Campbell pulled out when well behind on the scorecards.

=== Life after boxing ===
Campbell is now the gym owner and head coach of his gym, Galaxxy Boxing Refuge, in his hometown of Jacksonville, Florida. He also is the TV show host of Experience The Galaxxy with Nate Campbell. The show claims to be a politically based show discussing life in the African American Community. The show is streamed live on four platforms: Ustream, YouTube, Periscope and Facebook Live.

== Professional boxing record ==
50 fights	37 wins	11 losses
By knockout	26	4
By decision	10	7
By disqualification	1	0
Draws	1	
No contests	1	

No.	Result	Record	Opponent	Type	Round, time	Date	Location	Notes
50	Win	37–11–1 (1)	Gilbert Venegas	UD	8	Mar 29, 2014	Sandestin Golf and Beach Resort, Miramar Beach, Florida, U.S.	
49	Loss	36–11–1 (1)	Terry Flanagan	RTD	4 (10), 3:00	Apr 27, 2013	Motorpoint Arena, Sheffield, England	
48	Loss	36–10–1 (1)	Kevin Bizier	RTD	8 (12), 3:00	Feb 8, 2013	Bell Centre, Montreal, Quebec, Canada	For WBA–NABA and vacant IBF Inter-Continental welterweight titles
47	Win	36–9–1 (1)	Krzysztof Szot	UD	8	Jun 30, 2012	Atlas Arena, Łódź, Poland	
46	Win	35–9–1 (1)	Victor Cayo	TKO	9 (10), 0:45	Mar 24, 2012	Palacio de los Deportes Virgilio Travieso Soto, Santo Domingo, Dominican Republic	
45	Loss	34–9–1 (1)	Khabib Allakhverdiev	TD	6 (10), 0:54	Sep 25, 2011	Olimp Sports Palace, Krasnodar, Russia	Unanimous TD after Campbell was cut from an accidental head clash
44	Win	34–8–1 (1)	Sherzod Nazarov	UD	8	May 21, 2011	Krylatskoe Sport Palace, Moscow, Russia	
43	Loss	33–8–1 (1)	Danny García	UD	10	Apr 9, 2011	MGM Grand Garden Arena, Paradise, Nevada, U.S.	
42	Loss	33–7–1 (1)	Walter Estrada	SD	8	Nov 27, 2010	MGM Grand Garden Arena, Paradise, Nevada, U.S.	
41	Loss	33–6–1 (1)	Victor Ortiz	UD	10	May 15, 2010	The Theater at Madison Square Garden, New York City, New York, U.S.	
40	NC	33–5–1 (1)	Timothy Bradley	RTD	3 (12), 3:00	Aug 1, 2009	Agua Caliente Casino Resort Spa, Rancho Mirage, California, U.S.	WBO junior welterweight title at stake; Originally an RTD win for Bradley, later ruled an NC after an incorrect referee call
39	Win	33–5–1	Ali Funeka	MD	12	Feb 14, 2009	BankAtlantic Center, Sunrise, Florida, U.S.	
38	Win	32–5–1	Juan Díaz	SD	12	Mar 8, 2008	Plaza de Toros, Cancún, Mexico	Won WBA (Undisputed), IBF, and WBO lightweight titles
37	Win	31–5–1	Wilson Alcorro	TKO	6 (12), 0:21	Jul 6, 2007	Florida State Fairgrounds Hall, Tampa, Florida, U.S.	
36	Win	30–5–1	Ricky Quiles	UD	12	Mar 2, 2007	A La Carte Event Pavilion, Tampa, Florida, U.S.	
35	Win	29–5–1	Matt Zegan	UD	12	Oct 7, 2006	Allstate Arena, Rosemont, Illinois, U.S.	
34	Loss	28–5–1	Isaac Hlatshwayo	SD	12	Apr 17, 2006	Expo Hall, Tampa, Florida, U.S.	For IBO lightweight title
33	Win	28–4–1	Francisco Javier Olvera	RTD	6 (10), 3:00	Jan 27, 2006	Tropicana Casino & Resort, Atlantic City, New Jersey, U.S.	
32	Win	27–4–1	Almazbek Raiymkulov	TKO	10 (10), 2:26	Oct 1, 2005	St. Pete Times Forum, Tampa, Florida, U.S.	
31	Loss	26–4–1	Francisco Lorenzo	SD	10	Jun 14, 2005	Coliseum, St. Petersburg, Florida, U.S.	
30	Win	26–3–1	Johnny Walker	TKO	2 (8), 1:25	Apr 29, 2005	DoubleTree, Tampa, Florida, U.S.	
29	Loss	25–3–1	Robbie Peden	TKO	8 (12), 2:53	Feb 23, 2005	Vodafone Arena, Melbourne, Australia	For vacant IBF super featherweight title
28	Win	25–2–1	Edelmiro Martinez	DQ	4 (12), 1:10	Jul 30, 2004	Mohegan Sun Arena, Montville, Connecticut, U.S.	Martinez disqualified for repeated low blows
27	Loss	24–2–1	Robbie Peden	KO	5 (12), 2:27	Mar 14, 2004	Pechanga Resort & Casino, Temecula, California, U.S.	For USBA super featherweight title
26	Win	24–1–1	Daniel Attah	UD	12	Jan 9, 2004	Mohegan Sun Arena, Montville, Connecticut, U.S.	
25	Draw	23–1–1	Edelmiro Martinez	SD	10	May 17, 2003	Etess Arena, Atlantic City, New Jersey, U.S.	
24	Loss	23–1	Joel Casamayor	UD	10	Jan 25, 2003	Pechanga Resort & Casino, Temecula, California, U.S.	
23	Win	23–0	Renor Rojas Claure	KO	5 (10), 1:56	Nov 23, 2002	Boardwalk Hall, Atlantic City, New Jersey, U.S.	
22	Win	22–0	Daniel Alicea	KO	3 (12), 0:43	Sep 14, 2002	Mandalay Bay Events Center, Paradise, Nevada, U.S.	Won NABF and vacant WBA–NABA super featherweight titles
21	Win	21–0	Carlos Navarro	TKO	5 (10), 1:55	Jun 22, 2002	Beau Rivage, Biloxi, Mississippi, U.S.	
20	Win	20–0	Jaime Torres	TKO	5 (8)	Apr 27, 2002	Mohegan Sun Arena, Montville, Connecticut, U.S.	
19	Win	19–0	Alric Johnson	TKO	4 (12)	Mar 22, 2002	Civic Center, Savannah, Georgia, U.S.	Won vacant WBA–NABA super featherweight title
18	Win	18–0	Joseph Figueroa	UD	8	Feb 23, 2002	Jarrell's Boxing Gym, Savannah, Georgia, U.S.	
17	Win	17–0	James Baker	RTD	9 (10), 3:00	Feb 10, 2002	Grand Victoria Casino, Elgin, Illinois, U.S.	
16	Win	16–0	Michael Jamison	TKO	1	Nov 10, 2001	Civic Center, Savannah, Georgia, U.S.	
15	Win	15–0	Elias Juarez	TKO	4 (8)	Sep 29, 2001	Jarrell's Boxing Gym, Savannah, Georgia, U.S.	
14	Win	14–0	Victorio Abadia	TKO	8 (10), 1:55	Aug 31, 2001	Clarence H. "Du" Burns Arena, Baltimore, Maryland, U.S.	
13	Win	13–0	Steve Trumble	TKO	3 (10), 1:50	Aug 11, 2001	Auditorium, Melbourne, Florida, U.S.	
12	Win	12–0	Antonio Smith	TKO	2 (6)	Jul 28, 2001	Savannah, Georgia, U.S.	
11	Win	11–0	Keith Major	KO	2 (8), 1:51	Jun 23, 2001	Fort Homer W. Hesterly Armory, Tampa, Florida, U.S.	
10	Win	10–0	Angel Rios	UD	6	May 11, 2001	Civic Center, Savannah, Georgia, U.S.	
9	Win	9–0	Antonio Smith	KO	1	May 5, 2001	Silver Star Hotel & Casino, Choctaw, Mississippi, U.S.	
8	Win	8–0	Jaime Torres	TKO	3 (6), 2:53	Apr 21, 2001	PAL Gymnasium, Homestead, Florida, U.S.	
7	Win	7–0	Antonio Young	TKO	2 (8), 2:26	Feb 22, 2001	Fort Homer W. Hesterly Armory, Tampa, Florida, U.S.	
6	Win	6–0	John Frazier	KO	3 (6), 1:50	Jan 18, 2001	Grand Casino, Biloxi, Mississippi, U.S.	
5	Win	5–0	Ivan Dawson	TKO	2 (4), 1:57	Dec 3, 2000	Miccosukee Resort & Gaming, Miami, Florida, U.S.	
4	Win	4–0	Sergio Jose Olivas	TKO	6 (6)	Oct 28, 2000	Miccosukee Resort & Gaming, Miami, Florida, U.S.	
3	Win	3–0	John Trigg	TKO	4 (6), 3:00	Jun 23, 2000	Grand Casino, Biloxi, Mississippi, U.S.	
2	Win	2–0	Alex Brenes	TKO	2 (4), 2:18	May 26, 2000	Level Nightclub, Miami, Florida, U.S.	
1	Win	1–0	Scoey Fields	TKO	1 (4), 2:58	Feb 5, 2000	The Moon, Tallahassee, Florida, U.S.	

Sporting positions
Regional boxing titles
Vacant Title last held by Lamont Pearson	WBA–NABA super featherweight champion March 22, 2002 – June 2002; Vacated	Vacant Title next held by Kevin Kelley
Vacant Title last held by Kevin Kelley	WBA–NABA super featherweight champion September 14, 2002 – January 2004; Vacated	Vacant Title next held by Manuel Medina
Preceded by Daniel Alicea	NABF super featherweight champion September 14, 2002 – January 2004; Vacated	Vacant Title next held by Alejandro Medina
World boxing titles
Preceded by Juan Díaz	WBA lightweight champion Undisputed title March 8, 2008 – January 10, 2009; Vacated	Vacant Title next held by Juan Manuel Márquez
Preceded by Juan Díaz	IBF lightweight champion March 8, 2008 – February 13, 2009; Stripped	Vacant Title next held by Miguel Vázquez
Preceded by Juan Díaz	WBO lightweight champion March 8, 2008 – February 13, 2009; Stripped	Succeeded by Juan Manuel Márquez
