= Manny Pacquiao vs. Adrien Broner =

2019 boxing match

Return to Vegas
- Date: January 19, 2019
- Venue: MGM Grand Garden Arena, Las Vegas, Nevada, U.S.
- Title(s) on the line: WBA (Regular) welterweight title

Tale of the tape
Boxer	(Philippines) Manny Pacquiao	(United States) Adrien Broner
Nickname	"Pac-Man"	"The Problem"
Hometown	General Santos, South Cotabato, Philippines	Cincinnati, Ohio, U.S.
Pre-fight record	60–7–2 (39 KO)	33–3–1 (1) (24 KO)
Age	40 years, 1 month	29 years, 5 months
Height	5 ft 5 1/2 in (166 cm)	5 ft 6 1/2 in (169 cm)
Weight	145 1/2 lb (66 kg)	146 1/2 lb (66 kg)
Style	Southpaw	Orthodox
Recognition	WBA (Regular); Welterweight Champion; The Ring; No. 5 Ranked Welterweight; TBRB; No. 7 Ranked Welterweight; 8-division world champion	WBA; No. 6 Ranked Welterweight; 4-division world champion

Result
- Pacquiao wins via 12-round unanimous decision (117–111, 116–112, 116–112)

Manny Pacquiao vs. Adrien Broner, billed as Return to Vegas, was a boxing match for the WBA (Regular) welterweight championship. The event took place on January 19, 2019 at the MGM Grand Garden Arena in Las Vegas, Nevada. Pacquiao won the fight by unanimous decision and retained his WBA (Regular) welterweight title. The bout sold 400,000 pay-per-view (PPV) buys in the United States, earning an estimated $30 million in pay-per-view revenue. The bout also produced a live gate of $6 million from 11,410 tickets sold and the final attendance was reported to be 13,025.

== Background ==
After Pacquiao signed with Al Haymon in October 2018, reports circulated that Broner was the front-runner to face him in January 2019. Pacquiao confirmed on October 18 that the deal was almost complete. One month later on November 19, a press conference was held in New York City to confirm the fight between Pacquiao and Broner on January 19, 2019 for the WBA (Regular) welterweight title. Pacquiao reunited with long-time trainer Freddie Roach who supervised the whole training camp while Buboy Fernandez did the mitts and physical parts of the training due to Pacquiao's concern of Roach's health. The fight took place at the MGM Grand Garden Arena in Las Vegas, Nevada and was distributed by Showtime PPV.

== Fight details ==
Pacquiao successfully defended his WBA (Regular) welterweight title against Broner via unanimous decision and never seemed troubled throughout the fight. In the seventh round, Pacquiao trapped Broner on the ropes and unloaded a barrage of punches that prompted Broner to tie him up. Pacquiao then continued his onslaught after the break, but Broner survived the round. In the ninth round, Pacquiao caught Broner with a huge left hand that sent Broner reeling backwards. All three judges ruled in favor of Pacquiao 117–111, 116–112, 116–112.

According to CompuBox, Pacquiao landed 82 out of 197 of his power punches (42%) against Broner's 39 out of 180 power punches (22%). Total punch stats were 112 out of 568 (20%) for Pacquiao and 50 out of 295 (17%) for Broner. This marked Broner's career low for total punches landed at 50, his previous low was 90 against Jessie Vargas.

== Aftermath ==
During the post-fight interview, Jim Gray asked Pacquiao if a Floyd Mayweather Jr. rematch will happen and Pacquiao answered, "Tell him to come back to the ring, and we will fight." Mayweather, who was ringside, was asked by Gray to nod at the camera if he wanted a rematch with Pacquiao but did not give an answer. Meanwhile, Broner's interview immediately went south as he claimed victory and said, "I controlled the fight. He was missing. I hit him clean more times. I beat him." He alleged that it was a setup for a Mayweather–Pacquiao rematch and accused Gray of being against him. When Gray commented that Broner had three wins, three defeats and a draw in his last seven fights, Broner told Gray, "I'm 3–3–1 in my last seven but I'll be 7–0 against you," to which Gray responded, "Well that wouldn't mean much, that's the end of this interview."

== Fight card ==
Confirmed bouts:

Weight Class	Weight		vs.		Method	Round	Time	Notes
Welterweight	147 lbs.	(Philippines) Manny Pacquiao (c)	def.	(United States) Adrien Broner	UD (117–111, 116–112, 116–112)	12/12		^{Note 1}
Light Heavyweight	175 lbs.	(United States) Marcus Browne	def.	(Sweden) Badou Jack	UD (117–110, 116–111, 119–108)	12/12		^{Note 2}
Bantamweight	118 lbs.	(France) Nordine Oubaali	def.	(United States) Rau'shee Warren	UD (115–113, 116–112, 117–111)	12/12		^{Note 3}
Featherweight	125 lbs.	(Mexico) Hugo Ruiz	def.	(Mexico) Alberto Guevara	UD (100–89, 99–90, 99–90)	10/10
Lightweight	135 lbs.	(Australia) George Kambosos Jr.	def.	(Philippines) Rey Perez	UD (80–72, 80–72, 80–72)	8/8
Welterweight	147 lbs.	(United States) Jonathan Steele	def.	(Philippines) Jayar Inson	SD (74–77, 77–74, 78–73)	8/8
Super featherweight	130 lbs.	(United States) Desmond Jarmon	def.	(United States) Canton Miller	MD (59–55, 58–56, 57–57)	6/6
Welterweight	147 lbs.	(United States) Destyne Butler	def.	(United States) David Payne	UD (40–36, 40–36, 40–36)	4/4
Cruiserweight	200 lbs.	(United Kingdom) Viddal Riley	def.	(United States) Mitchell Spangler	KO	1/4	0:33

^Note 1 For WBA (Regular) welterweight title
^Note 2 For vacant WBA interim and WBC silver light heavyweight titles
^Note 3 For vacant WBC bantamweight title

== Broadcasting ==
The fight was shown live on Showtime PPV in the United States, Cignal and Sky Sports in the Philippines and free on ITV4 in the United Kingdom.

Country	Broadcaster			
Country	Free-to-air	Cable/pay television	PPV	Stream
Australia	—N/a		Main Event	—N/a
Austria	—N/a			DAZN
France	—N/a	Canal+ Sport	—N/a	My Canal
Germany	—N/a			DAZN
Indonesia	tvOne	—N/a		VIVA
Italy	—N/a			DAZN
Japan	—N/a	Wowow	—N/a	Wowow
(Middle East and North Africa) MENA	—N/a		OSN Sports Box Office	OSN Play
Mexico	Azteca 7	—N/a		Azteca En Vivo
Mexico	—N/a	Fox Premium		Fox Play
Monaco	—N/a	Canal+ Sport	—N/a	My Canal
New Zealand	—N/a		Sky Arena	—N/a
(Panama) Panamá	Telemetro	—N/a		Medcom Go
Philippines	The 5 Network (delayed)	One Sports (delayed)	Cignal	Cignal Play
Philippines	The 5 Network (delayed)	One Sports (delayed)	Cignal	ESPN5 (delayed)
Philippines	ABS-CBN S+A (delayed)		Sky Sports	Sky On Demand
Philippines	Solar Sports (delayed)		Sky Sports	Sky On Demand
Philippines	GMA Network (delayed)	—N/a		
Poland	TVP Sport	—N/a		TVP Stream
Russia	Match TV			
South America: Argentina; Bolivia; Brazil; Chile; Colombia; Ecuador; Paraguay; Peru; Uruguay; Venezuela	—N/a	Fox Premium		Fox Play
Sub-Saharan Africa	—N/a	SuperSport	—N/a	DStv Now
Switzerland	—N/a			DAZN
Tajikistan	Varzish TV	—N/a		Varzish TV
Thailand	—N/a	True Sport	—N/a	True ID
Turkey	DMAX	—N/a		DMAX
United Kingdom	ITV4	—N/a	—N/a	ITV Hub
United Kingdom	ITV4	—N/a	—N/a	TVPlayer
United States	—N/a		Showtime	

Preceded by vs. Lucas Matthysse	Manny Pacquiao's bouts 19 January 2019	Succeeded by vs. Keith Thurman
Preceded by vs. Jessie Vargas	Adrien Broner's bouts 19 January 2019	Succeeded by vs. Jovanie Santiago
