= Stephen Espinoza =

American sports and corporate executive

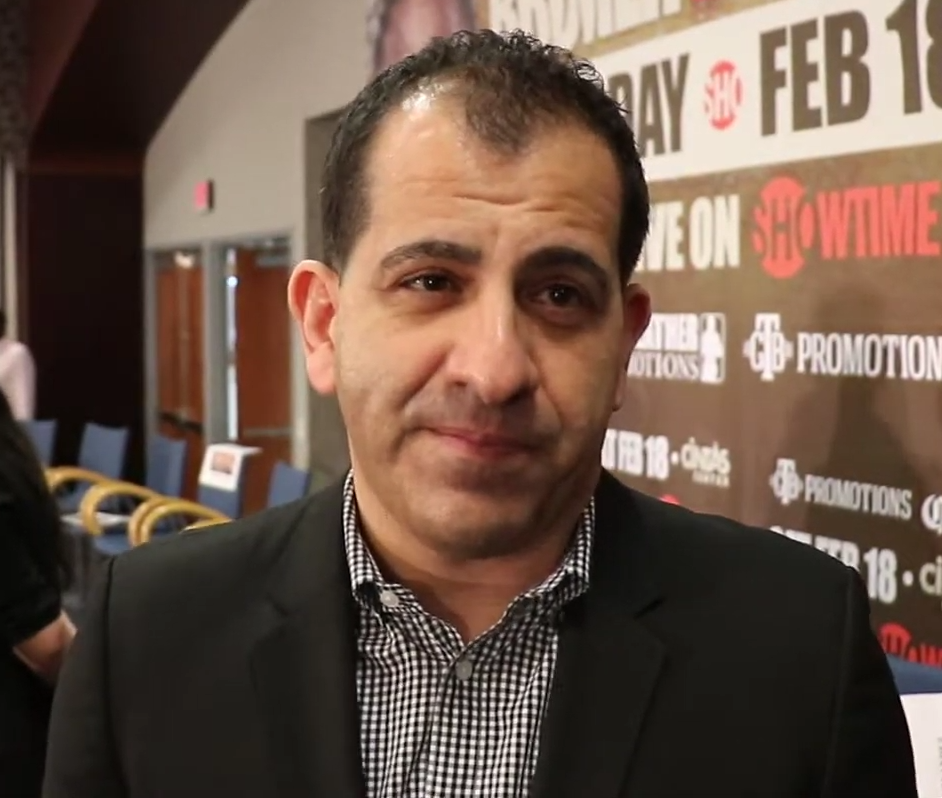
- Espinoza in 2017
- Born: January 1, 1970 (age 56); El Paso, Texas, U.S.
- Education: Stanford University (BA); University of California, Los Angeles (JD)
- Occupations: Sports & Corporate Executive

Stephen Espinoza (born January 1, 1970) is an American sports and corporate executive. He is the former president of Showtime Sports.

== Early life ==
Espinoza is a native of El Paso, Texas and graduated from Coronado High School in 1988. He is of Mexican descent.

== Education ==
Following his graduation from high school, Espinoza attended Stanford University, obtaining a B.A. in communication in 1992. He then went on to earn a J.D. from the UCLA School of Law in 1996.

== Career ==
While still at UCLA, Espinoza began working for sports agent Leigh Steinberg. However, he switched career tracks and accepted a position at Greenberg Glusker in 1996 before eventually moving on to Ziffren Brittenham LLP in 2002. Both firms specialize in entertainment law. His clients included Vanessa Hudgens, Josh Gad, Snoop Dogg and Tyler Perry, as well as former NFL star Michael Strahan and MMA fighter Gina Carano.

=== Introduction into boxing ===
Through his work at Ziffren Brittenham LLP, Espinoza came to represent professional boxers Oscar De La Hoya and Mike Tyson.

==== Golden Boy Promotions ====
Espinoza formerly served as lead counsel for De La Hoya's Golden Boy Promotions.

=== Showtime Sports ===
On November 14, 2011, Espinoza was announced as the new head of Showtime Sports, replacing Ken Hershman. Since his move to Showtime, Espinoza has made boxing a focus of the network. In 2012, he signed Floyd Mayweather Jr. to a six-fight, multi-year deal. Espinoza was also reportedly "instrumental" in the Floyd Mayweather Jr. vs. Manny Pacquiao fight. Under Espinoza's supervision, the Showtime-Mayweather deal accounted for the three highest-grossing pay-per-view events in television history — Mayweather-Canelo in September 2013, Mayweather-Pacquiao in May 2015, and Mayweather-McGregor in August 2017. In January 2018, Espinoza was promoted from Executive Vice President to President of Showtime Sports.

Espinoza, along with the entire staff of Showtime Sports, was laid off in October 2023 when Paramount shuttered the division.

== See also ==
- Showtime Championship Boxing
